= List of songs produced by Jeff Lynne =

This is a list of songs and artists that Jeff Lynne has produced.

== Electric Light Orchestra ==
=== Out of the Blue ===
All music and lyrics were written by Jeff Lynne. Orchestra and choral arrangements by Jeff Lynne, Richard Tandy and Louis Clark. Orchestra conducted by Louis Clark.

==== Included on original version ====
- "Turn to Stone"
- "It's Over"
- "Sweet Talkin' Woman"
- "Across the Border"
- "Night in the City"
- "Starlight"
- "Jungle"
- "Believe Me Now"
- "Steppin' Out"
- "Standin' in the Rain"
- "Big Wheels"
- "Summer and Lightning"
- "Mr. Blue Sky"
- "Sweet Is the Night"
- "The Whale"
- "Birmingham Blues"
- "Wild West Hero"

==== 2007 bonus tracks ====
- "The Quick and the Daft"
- "Latitude 88 North"

=== Discovery ===
==== Included on original version ====
- "Shine a Little Love"
- "Confusion"
- "Need Her Love"
- "The Diary of Horace Wimp"
- "Last Train to London"
- "Midnight Blue"
- "On the Run"
- "Wishing"
- "Don't Bring Me Down"

==== 2001 Bonus tracks ====
- "On the Run" (Home Demo)
- "Second Time Around" (Home Demo)
- "Little Town Flirt"

All Songs Written by Jeff Lynne except the latter, written by Maron McKenzie and Del Shannon

== George Harrison ==
=== Cloud Nine ===
Song	Composer(s)
"Cloud 9"	George Harrison
"That's What It Takes"	George Harrison, Jeff Lynne, Gary Wright
"Fish on the Sand"	George Harrison
"Just for Today"	Harrison
"This Is Love"	Harrison and Lynne
"When We Was Fab"	Harrison and Lynne
"Devil's Radio"	Harrison
"Someplace Else"	Harrison
"Wreck of the Hesperus"	Harrison
"Breath Away from Heaven"	Harrison
"Got My Mind Set on You"	Rudy Clark

=== Brainwashed ===
All songs written by George Harrison, except track 10, written by Harold Arlen and Ted Koehler.

- "Any Road"
- "P2 Vatican Blues (Last Saturday Night)"
- "Pisces Fish"
- "Looking for My Life"
- "Rising Sun"
- "Marwa Blues"
- "Stuck Inside a Cloud"
- "Run So Far" –
- "Never Get Over You"
- "Between the Devil and the Deep Blue Sea"
- "Rocking Chair in Hawaii"
- "Brainwashed"

Includes a concluding prayer, the "Namah Parvati", chanted by Harrison and his son Dhani Harrison in unison.

== Traveling Wilburys ==
=== Traveling Wilburys Vol. 1 ===
==== Included on original version ====
All songs written by the Traveling Wilburys (Harrison, Lynne, Bob Dylan, Roy Orbison and Tom Petty).

- "Handle with Care"
- "Dirty World"
- "Rattled"
- "Last Night"
- "Not Alone Any More"
- "Congratulations"
- "Heading for the Light"
- "Margarita"
- "Tweeter and the Monkey Man"
- "End of the Line"

==== 2007 bonus tracks ====
- "Maxine"
- "Like a Ship"

=== Traveling Wilburys Vol. 3 ===
==== Included on original version ====
All songs written by the Traveling Wilburys.

- "She's My Baby"
- "Inside Out"
- "If You Belonged To Me"
- "Devil's Been Busy"
- "7 Deadly Sins"
- "Poor House"
- "Where Were You Last Night?"
- "Cool Dry Place"
- "New Blue Moon"
- "You Took My Breath Away"
- "Wilbury Twist"

=== 2007 Bonus tracks ===
Song	Composer
"Nobody's Child"	Cy Coben, Mel Foree
"Runaway"	Del Shannon, Max D. Crook)

== Tom Petty ==
=== Full Moon Fever ===
Song	Composer(s)
"Free Fallin'"	Jeff Lynne, Tom Petty
"I Won't Back Down"	Jeff Lynne, Tom Petty
"Love is a Long Road"	Mike Campbell, Petty
" A face in the crowd"	Jeff Lynne, Tom Petty
"Runnin' Down a Dream"	Campbell, Lynne and Petty
"I'll Feel a Whole Lot Better"	Gene Clark
"Yer So Bad"	Lynne and Petty
"Depending on You"	Tom Petty
"The Apartment Song"	Petty
"Alright for Now"	Petty
"A Mind with a Heart of Its Own"	Lynne and Petty
"Zombie Zoo"	Lynne and Petty

=== Into the Great Wide Open ===
Song	Composer
"Learning to Fly"	Tom Petty, Jeff Lynne
"Kings Highway"	Petty
"Into the Great Wide Open"	Petty and Lynne
"Two Gunslingers"	Petty
" The Dark of the Sun"	Petty and Lynne
"All or Nothin'"	Petty, Mike Campbell, Lynne
"All the Wrong Reasons"	Petty
"Too Good to Be True"	Petty
"Out in the Cold"	Petty, Lynne
"You and I Will Meet Again"	Petty
"Makin' Some Noise"	Petty, Campbell, Lynne
"Built to Last"	Petty and Lynne

=== A Very Special Christmas 2 ===
- Christmas All Over Again

=== Highway Companion ===
All songs written by Tom Petty, no exceptions.

==== Included on standard version ====
- "Saving Grace"
- "Square One"
- "Flirting with Time"
- "Down South"
- "Jack"
- "Turn This Car Around"
- "Big Weekend"
- "Night Driver"
- "Damaged by Love"
- "This Old Town"
- "Ankle Deep"
- "The Golden Rose"

==== Special Edition bonus tracks ====
- "Home"
- "Around the Roses"
- "Big Weekend" (demo version)
- "This Old Town" (demo version)

== Roy Orbison ==
- "You Got It"
- "A Love So Beautiful"
- "California Blue"
- "Heartbreak Radio"
- "I Drove All Night

== The Beatles ==
- "Free as a Bird"
- "Real Love"
- "Now and Then" (additional production)

== Paul McCartney ==
=== Flaming Pie ===
All songs written by Paul McCartney, except where noted.

- The Song We Were Singing"
- "The World Tonight"
- "If You Wanna"
- "Somedays"
- "Young Boy"
- "Calico Skies"
- "Flaming Pie"
- "Heaven on a Sunday"
- "Used to Be Bad" (Steve Miller, McCartney)
- "Souvenir"
- "Little Willow"
- "Really Love You" (McCartney, Richard Starkey)
- "Beautiful Night"
- "Great Day"

== Julianna Raye ==
=== Something Peculiar ===
All songs written by Julianna Raye, no exceptions.

- "Limbo"
- "I'll Get You Back"
- "Tell Me I'm Alright"
- "Taking Steps"
- "Peach Window"
- "Something Peculiar"
- "Roses"
- "Laughing Wild"
- "In My Time"
- "My Tribe"
- "Nicola"

== Dave Edmunds ==
=== Information ===
- "Slipping Away" (Jeff Lynne)
- "Information" (Dave Edmunds, Mark Radice)

=== Riff Raff ===
- "Something About You" (Lamont Dozier, Eddie Holland, Brian Holland)
- "Breaking Out" (Jeff Lynne)
- "Busted Loose" (Paul Brady)
- "Far Away" (Jeff Lynne)
- "S.O.S." (Jeff Lynne)
- "Hang On" (Steve Gould)

== Regina Spektor ==
=== Far ===
Lynne produced several tracks on Regina Spektor's album Far released in 2009:

- Blue Lips
- Folding Chair
- Genius Next Door
- Wallet

== See also ==
- Jeff Lynne and The Beatles
- The Beatles reunions
