= I Hear You Rockin' (Dave Edmunds Band album) =

I Hear You Rockin’

Live album by The Dave Edmunds Band
- Released: 1986
- Recorded: Roseland Ballroom, New York City; The Venue, London; The Capitol Theatre, Passaic, NJ
- Genre: Rock and roll, rockabilly
- Length: 35:03
- Label: Columbia
- Producer: Dave Edmunds

Professional ratings
Review scores
Source	Rating
All Music Guide to Rock (Stephen Thomas Erlewine)	3/5 stars
Rolling Stone	3/5 stars

I Hear You Rockin’ is a live album released by The Dave Edmunds Band in 1986 on Columbia LP record 40603.

== Background ==
This “live” album was tweaked in the studio by Edmunds, who is known for his production perfectionism. It was to be his last solo effort for Columbia, and mostly features songs already associated with Edmunds. Two songs were previously un-recorded by him, “Paralyzed” and “The Wanderer.”

== Reception ==
This album entered the Billboard 200 album charts on January 31, 1987 and remained on the charts for twelve weeks, peaking at position #106. The album has been reviewed as “energetic,” “enjoyable,” and “excellent.”

== Track listing ==
1. "Girls Talk" (Elvis Costello)
2. "Here Comes The Weekend" (Dave Edmunds, Nick Lowe)
3. "Queen of Hearts" (Hank DeVito)
4. "Paralyzed" (Otis Blackwell, Elvis Presley)
5. "The Wanderer" (Ernie Maresca)
6. "Crawling from the Wreckage" (Graham Parker)
7. "Slipping Away" (Jeff Lynne)
8. "Information" (Dave Edmunds, Mark Radice)
9. "I Hear You Knocking" (Dave Bartholomew, Pearl King)
10. "I Knew the Bride (When She Used to Rock and Roll)" (Nick Lowe)
11. "Ju Ju Man" (Jim Ford, Lolly Vegas)

== Personnel ==
- Dave Charles - drums
- John David – bass guitar, vocals
- Dave Edmunds – guitar, vocals
- Mickey Gee - guitar
- Geraint Watkins – keyboards, vocals
