= D.E. 7th =

Studio album by Dave Edmunds
- Released: 8 April 1982
- Recorded: 1982
- Studio: Eden, London
- Genre: Rock
- Length: 33:12
- Label: Arista (UK); Columbia (US)
- Producer: Dave Edmunds

Dave Edmunds chronology
Twangin... (1981)	D.E. 7th (1982)	Information (1983)

D.E. 7th is a 1982 album by Welsh rock musician Dave Edmunds. The album was Edmunds' first project for Arista Records (in the UK) and Columbia Records (in the US), following a five-year stay with the Swan Song label.

Besides the label switches, D.E. 7th marked another big change for Edmunds; his band Rockpile had broken up the previous year, forcing him to assemble a whole new group of musicians for the album. The new band coalesced around guitarist Mickey Gee and bassist John David (both of whom had played with Edmunds in Love Sculpture), veteran pub rock pianist Geraint Watkins, and drummer Dave Charles. This group, who'd already recorded an album together as Geraint Watkins and the Dominators, would record and tour with Edmunds throughout the rest of the 1980s.

D.E. 7th would reach #60 on the UK album charts and #46 on the Billboard 200, becoming his highest-charting solo album ever in the United States. The album's sales were helped by the inclusion of a previously unreleased Bruce Springsteen song, "From Small Things (Big Things One Day Come)" (Springsteen's version, an outtake from his 1980 album The River, would remain unreleased until 2003). In his 2005 book The Ties That Bind, author Gary Graff explains:

When (Edmunds) went to see Springsteen perform at Wembley Arena (in 1981), he expected a good show but not necessarily a new song to record. "I was backstage in the hospitality area after the gig," Edmunds remembered, "and one of his crew of road managers tapped me on the shoulder and said, 'Bruce wants to meet you.' I went back and had this great talk with him, and he played me this song and said, 'I'd like you to do this, if you like it.' He said he'd send me the tape, which he did."

Edmunds' recording of "From Small Things" was released as a single, and reached #28 on Billboard's Mainstream Rock Tracks chart, and later appeared on his 2004 "best of" collection (also entitled From Small Things). One other D.E. 7th track was selected for that collection: a cover of Brian Hyland's 1962 top-30 hit "Warmed Over Kisses (Left Over Love)". Edmunds transformed the song, originally a countrypolitan waltz, into an uptempo bluegrass romp.

Edmunds told the New Musical Express at the time that he had happened across pianist Liam Grundy playing in a bar quite by chance and upon hearing the heartfelt ballad "One More Night" invited Grundy to the studio a couple of days later to record it.

== Critical reception ==
Professional ratings
Review scores
Source	Rating
AllMusic	3.5/5 stars
Billboard	(unrated)
Robert Christgau	B+
Rolling Stone	4/5 stars

Stephen Thomas Erlewine of AllMusic says that the album "lacks the pop sensibilities that made early Edmunds a guilty pleasure, concentrating instead on roots musics. While that occasionally means there's mis-steps like "Deep in the Heart of Texas," but it also means the wonderful bluegrass-stomp "Warmed Over Kisses (Left Over Love)," the country-rocker "Bail You Out," the cajun-tinged "Louisiana Man" and the excellent Springsteen cover "From Small Things (Big Things One Day Come)." The rest of D.E. 7th is uneven, but there a few enjoyable cuts, and compared to what came later, it's certainly more fun." Cash Box calls the album a "sharp-sounding, high-powered success."

== Track listing ==
1. "From Small Things (Big Things One Day Come)" (Bruce Springsteen) – 3:30
2. "Me and the Boys" (Terry Adams) – 3:04
3. "Bail You Out" (Chris Rees) – 2:28
4. "Generation Rumble" (Graham Lyle) – 3:36
5. "Other Guys Girls" (Christopher Gent) – 2:47
6. "Warmed Over Kisses (Left Over Love)" (Gary Geld, Peter Udell) – 3:03
7. "Deep in the Heart of Texas" (Geraint Watkins) – 2:36
8. "Louisiana Man" (Doug Kershaw) – 3:41
9. "Paula Meet Jeanne" (Jude Cole) – 2:40
10. "One More Night" (Liam Grundy) – 3:56
11. "Dear Dad" (Chuck Berry) – 1:51

== Personnel ==
Musicians

- Dave Edmunds – guitar, bass, keyboards, vocal
- Dave Charles – drums
- John David – bass
- Geraint Watkins – piano, keyboards
- Bobby Irwin – drums (tracks 4, 6, 9)
- Dave Peacock – banjo (track 6), bass (tracks 4, 6)
- John Earle – baritone & tenor saxophone (tracks 1, 9)
- Dick Hanson – trumpet (tracks 1, 7)
- Mickey Gee – guitar (track 8)
- Albert Lee – guitar (track 9)
- Liam Grundy – piano (track 10)
- Neil King – trumpet (track 9)

Technical

- Dave Edmunds – producer
- Carey Taylor – engineer
- Aldo Bocca – engineer
- Lynn Goldsmith – photography
