= Crawling from the Wreckage =

1979 single by Dave Edmunds

Single by Dave Edmunds

from the album Repeat When Necessary
- B-side: "As Lovers Do"
- Released: 16 November 1979
- Recorded: 1978
- Genre: Rockabilly; new wave
- Length: 2:53
- Label: Swan Song
- Songwriter: Graham Parker
- Producer: Dave Edmunds

Dave Edmunds singles chronology
| "Queen of Hearts" (1979) | "Crawling from the Wreckage" (1979) | "Almost Saturday Night" (1981) |

"Crawling from the Wreckage" is a new wave song written by Graham Parker and first released by Dave Edmunds in 1979. Parker, who was unsatisfied with the song, contributed the song to Edmunds, who included it on his album Repeat When Necessary. Edmunds' version peaked at number 59 on the UK Singles Chart.

Since its release on Repeat When Necessary, other versions of the song recorded by Edmunds' band Rockpile as well as Parker have been released.

== Background ==
Graham Parker wrote "Crawling from the Wreckage" shortly after getting into a car accident. He gave it to Dave Edmunds to record for his 1979 album Repeat When Necessary. Edmunds explained, "He called me up from the studio. He was in there with his band, the Rumour. They were trying to record it and it wasn't working, for some reason. It kept coming out like another song he'd done, 'East Coast Shuffle' or something like that ["New York Shuffle"]. And he said, 'It's just not working with us but it sounds like it'll work for you! Do you want it?' And I said, 'Yep' and I did it and that was it."

Parker, meanwhile, stated the song was a Squeezing Out Sparks reject that Rumour guitarist Martin Belmont thought Edmunds would like. Parker recalled, "'Crawling' was written at the time I was writing the Sparks material and was obviously too frivolous a song to fit with those sessions. Martin Belmont, as it happens, heard my demo of it and asked if he could play it for Dave who was scouting for stuff. Good call, Mart."

== Release ==
In addition to appearing as the second track on Edmunds' 1979 album Repeat When Necessary, "Crawling from the Wreckage" was released as the third single from that album. The single reached number 59 in the UK. Since then, the song has appeared on several Edmunds compilation albums.

The song's sales led Parker to joke that the song kept him in swimming pools, though he later remarked, "I was of course joking when I said Edmunds' version of 'Wreckage' has kept me in swimming pools ever since. It might have paid for the odd hairbrush, though."

== Critical reception ==
Goldmine called the song "hilarious". AllMusic dubbed it a "classic" and "relentless" in a retrospective review. Ultimate Classic Rock ranked it Edmunds' third best song on their top ten list of Edmunds songs, writing that it "sounds tailor-made for Edmunds, who swings and sways throughout."

== Chart history ==
| Chart (1979–80) | Peak position |
|---|---|
| UK Singles Chart | 59 |

== Other versions ==
"Crawling from the Wreckage" regularly appeared in setlists for shows by Edmunds' band Rockpile. Live versions of the song appears on the Rockpile live albums Live at Rockpalast and Live at Montreux 1980. Edmunds also included a live take done with the Dave Edmunds Band on I Hear You Rockin'. Two live takes by Parker have also been released: a cut on his 1996 live album, Live from New York, NY, as well as a 1979 live take performed with the Rumour on the 2016 compilation These Dreams Never Sleep.

Status Quo also released a version of the song. Parker later stated he was "thrilled" that the band covered the song. He stated, "I bought a copy right away. ... To be covered by Quo...I was pleasantly stunned."
