= Rockpile (disambiguation) =

Rockpile or The Rockpile may refer to:

- Rockpile, 1970s and early 1980s British rock and roll band
- Rockpile AVA, the American Viticultural Area
- The Rockpile, the Vietnam War geographic location
- Rockpile (album), an album by Dave Edmunds
- War Memorial Stadium (Buffalo, New York), the American football stadium known as "The Rockpile"
- A pile of rocks (sometimes known as a cairn)
- "The Rockpile", local nickname for Mount Washington (New Hampshire)
- The Rockpile (short story), a story by James Baldwin first published in 1965
