= Plugged In =

Studio album by Dave Edmunds
- Released: 19 July 1994
- Recorded: September 1993 – February 1994
- Genre: Rock
- Length: 42:18
- Label: Pyramid (US)/Rhino
- Producer: Dave Edmunds

Dave Edmunds chronology
Closer to the Flame (1989)	Plugged In (1994)

Professional ratings
Review scores
Source	Rating
AllMusic	3.5/5 stars
Rolling Stone	4/5 stars

Plugged In is a 1994 album by Welsh rock musician Dave Edmunds. The album is the last completely new studio album released by Edmunds to feature vocals.

On Plugged In, Edmunds returned to the "one man band" approach of his early solo records; all of the instruments and vocals on the album are performed by him via overdubbing.

The album includes a remake of Khachaturian's "Sabre Dance", which was a No. 5 UK hit in 1968 for Edmunds' band, Love Sculpture.

== Track listing ==
1. "Chutes & Ladders" (John David) – 4:05
2. "One Step Back" (Billy Gibbons, Jerry Williams) – 4:20
3. "I Love Music" (Edmunds) – 5:10
4. "Halfway Down" (Jim Lauderdale) – 3:26
5. "Beach Boy Blood (In My Veins)" (Michael Scott Lanning) – 3:17
6. "The Claw" (Jerry Reed) – 2:36
7. "I Got the Will" (Otis Redding) – 4:35
8. "Better Word for Love" (Al Anderson) – 3:11
9. "Standing at the Crossroads" (Mickey Jupp) – 3:24
10. "It Doesn't Really Matter" (John David, Edmunds) – 3:18
11. "Sabre Dance '94" (Aram Khachaturian) – 4:56

== Personnel ==
- Dave Edmunds – all instruments, production, engineering
