= Slipping Away (Dave Edmunds song) =

Single by Dave Edmunds

from the album Information
- B-side: "Don't Call Me Tonight"
- Released: 1983
- Genre: Pop rock
- Length: 4:20
- Label: Arista (UK); Columbia Records (US)
- Songwriter: Jeff Lynne
- Producer: Jeff Lynne

Dave Edmunds singles chronology
| "Run Rudolph Run" (1982) | "Slipping Away" (1983) | "Information" (1983) |

Music video
- "Slipping Away" on YouTube

"Slipping Away" is a Top 40 pop song performed by Welsh singer/guitarist Dave Edmunds. The song was written and produced by Jeff Lynne of Electric Light Orchestra fame and was included on Edmunds' 1983 album Information. "Slipping Away" was released as a single and became Edmunds' second and final Top 40 single in the US, following 1970's "I Hear You Knocking".

"Slipping Away" reached number 39 on the Billboard Hot 100, number 7 on the Mainstream Rock Chart, and number 60 on the UK Singles Chart. The song has since appeared on several 1980s music compilations. The song's music video was directed by Peter Sinclair.

== Track listing ==
7" and 12" Vinyl

1. "Slipping Away" – 4:20
2. "Don't Call Me Tonight" – 2:26

== Personnel ==
- Dave Edmunds - guitar, vocals
- John David - bass
- Dave Charles - drums
- Richard Tandy - synthesizer

== Chart history ==
| Chart (1983) | Peak position |
|---|---|
| Belgium (Ultratop 50 Flanders) | 35 |
| Netherlands (Single Top 100) | 47 |
| UK Singles (OCC) | 60 |
| US Billboard Hot 100 | 39 |
| US CashBox Top 100 | 32 |
| US Mainstream Rock (Billboard) | 7 |

== See also ==
- List of songs produced by Jeff Lynne
