= Twangin... =

Studio album by Dave Edmunds
- Released: 20 April 1981
- Studios: Eden, London; Rockfield, Wales
- Genre: Rock
- Length: 30:27
- Label: Swan Song
- Producer: Dave Edmunds

Dave Edmunds chronology
Repeat When Necessary (1979)	Twangin... (1981)	D.E. 7th (1982)

Professional ratings
Review scores
Source	Rating
AllMusic	3.5/5 stars
Robert Christgau	B
The Rolling Stone Album Guide	3/5 stars

Twangin... is a 1981 album by Dave Edmunds, and his final recording for Swan Song Records before moving to Columbia Records. The album would be the last Edmunds solo effort to feature Rockpile.

Twangin... consists mostly of outtakes from previous recording sessions, including one track dating to 1968, a version of "Baby Let's Play House", a rockabilly number made famous by Elvis Presley. The album also features a collaboration with the Stray Cats, whose debut album Edmunds produced.

The album is almost entirely made up of cover songs, including the Wilson Pickett B-side "Three Time Loser" and the George Jones classic "The Race Is On" (with the Stray Cats).

The album art, featuring a portrait of Edmunds, is by Barney Bubbles.

== Track listing ==
Side one

1. "Something Happens" (John Hiatt) - 3:13
2. "It's Been So Long" (Ian Gomm) - 2:14
3. "Singin' the Blues" (Melvin Endsley) - 2:58
4. "(I'm Gonna Start) Living Again If It Kills Me" (Nick Lowe, Carlene Carter, Edmunds) - 3:20
5. "Almost Saturday Night" (John Fogerty) - 2:10

Side two

1. "Cheap Talk, Patter and Jive" (Hank DeVito, Donivan Cowart) - 3:05
2. "Three Time Loser" (Don Covay, Ron Miller) - 2:43
3. "You'll Never Get Me Up (In One of Those)" (Mickey Jupp) - 3:46
4. "I'm Only Human" (Lowe, Rockpile) - 2:07
5. "The Race Is On" (feat. Stray Cats)(Don Rollins) - 2:04
6. "Baby Let's Play House" (Arthur Gunter) - 2:18

== Personnel ==
- Dave Edmunds - guitar, vocals
- Nick Lowe (credited as "Nicky Lowe") - bass, except on "The Race Is On" and "Baby Let's Play House"
- Terry Williams - drums, except on "The Race Is On" and "Baby Let's Play House"
- Billy Bremner - guitar, except on "The Race Is On" and "Baby Let's Play House"
- Chesterfield Kings - harp on "Cheap Talk, Patter and Jive"
- Brian Setzer - guitar on "The Race Is On"
- Lee Rocker - string bass on "The Race Is On"
- Slim Jim Phantom - drums on "The Race Is On"
- John Williams (later known as John David) - string bass on "Baby Let's Play House"
- Mickey Gee - electric guitar on "Baby Let's Play House"
- Aldo Bocca - Engineer
