= Dave Charles =

British drummer, recording engineer & record producer

- Born: David Charles
- Genres: Rock, country rock, blues
- Occupations: Musician, recording engineer, record producer
- Instrument: Drums
- Years active: 1967–present
- Formerly of: Help Yourself, Sam Apple Pie, Dave Edmunds, Kid Creole & the Coconuts, Airwaves

David Charles is a British drummer, recording engineer & record producer. He often appears under both names on the same album, e.g. Help Yourself's The Return of Ken Whaley, where Dave Charles is credited with drums and vocals and David Charles as producer.

== Career ==
Charles joined Walthamstow blues-rock band Sam Apple Pie, appearing on their eponymous first album in 1969, and then playing with Help Yourself at the first Glastonbury Festival in 1970. As well as a drummer, he was also interested in electronics, and recorded the infamous performance that became known as the "Brinsley Schwarz Hype" at the Fillmore East in 1970.

Malcolm Morley left Sam Apple Pie and invited Charles to join his new band Help Yourself, for whom he drummed on all 6 of their albums, and played an early synthesiser. Whilst with Help Yourself Charles also drummed on the eponymous album by Ernie Graham (ex Eire Apparent), and Deke Leonard's album Iceberg. After the breakup of Help Yourself in 1973, Charles recorded Unusual with Roger Ruskin Spear, Fish for Barry Melton and rejoined Tim Rose for Magician. He drummed for, and recorded albums with, several Welsh bands, including Geraint Watkins, The Neutrons, Deke Leonard and Clive John.

Most of these albums were recorded at Rockfield Studios, where Charles tried using the recording desk, because "someone had to do it, and it all looked fairly simple really." He knew Rockfield boss Kingsley Ward from Monmouth, as well as the studio, and Kingsley offered to train him as a recording engineer. He became resident engineer at Rockfield between 1975 and 1977, engineering albums for Hawkwind (Warrior on the Edge of Time; Quark, Strangeness and Charm and PXR5), Dr. Feelgood (Down by the Jetty), Dave Edmunds (Get It), Judas Priest and Graham Parker.

In the mid-1970s, Charles joined musician and songwriter John David to form a group, Airwaves, as drummer. The group recorded the albums New Day and Next Stop in 1978 and 1979, respectively. In 1978, they also had a minor hit, "So Hard Livin' Without You" (U.S. #62).

In 1981, he had a long stint with Dave Edmunds including D.E. 7th, Information, Riff Raff and I Hear You Rockin'. He also drummed on albums by Bryn Haworth (Pass It On) and Sheila Walsh (Future Eyes), before joining Latin Quarter and playing with Andy Fairweather-Low and Hugh Masekela. He also engineered Power Supply, by Budgie, their eighth studio album.

By 1985 he was undertaking more engineering, including albums by Jeff Beck (Flash), The Fabulous Thunderbirds (Hot Number), Nick Lowe (Pinker and Prouder than Previous and Party of One) the Stray Cats and Nelson Rangell. Having become known as an engineer, he recorded The La's album The La's, and worked with The Charlatans where his role changed from initially being the engineer, on The Charlatans, to becoming the producer on Tellin' Stories and numerous Charlatans singles.

In the 2000s, he has produced albums for Man, Paul Chapman and Dr. Feelgood.
