= Closer to the Flame (Dave Edmunds album) =

Studio album by Dave Edmunds
- Released: December 1989
- Studios: Capitol, Hollywood, California; Ardent, Memphis, Tennessee
- Genre: Rock
- Length: 38:47
- Label: Capitol
- Producer: Dave Edmunds

Dave Edmunds chronology
Riff Raff (1984)	Closer to the Flame (1989)	Plugged In (1994)

Closer to the Flame is a 1989 album by Welsh rock musician Dave Edmunds. The album was Edmunds's first studio album in five years and his only release on Capitol Records.

The album reached No. 146 on the Billboard 200 chart in the United States, and the single "King of Love" hit No. 68 in the UK Singles chart. This was Edmunds' last chart appearance in America to date. However, in the UK, Edmunds had a top 40 album best in 2008.

The track "King of Love" features guest appearances by two members of the Stray Cats: Brian Setzer contributed background vocals, and Lee Rocker played upright bass.

It was recorded at Capitol Studios in Hollywood, California, and Ardent Studios in Memphis, Tennessee.

== Reviews ==
Professional ratings
Review scores
Source	Rating
AllMusic	2/5 stars
The Rolling Stone Album Guide	2.5/5 stars

Although it was not considered to be one of Edmunds’ best albums, it was generally well received by critics. Entertainment Weekly’s Greg Sandow enthused, "I’m trying to think of someone who wouldn’t love this album. Manuel Noriega? Right from the start, the music goes down like good whiskey, with a big, deep sound that warms the pit of your gut.” The Washington Post wrote that the "vocals never make the emotional connection that Presley and Lewis once made (and that Costello and Parker still make). As a result, Closer to the Flame is a fine example of pop craftsmanship rather than a cathartic experience."

== Track listing ==
1. "Closer to the Flame" (Fontaine Brown, Scott Mathews, Ron Nagle)
2. "Fallin' Through a Hole" (Michael Lanning)
3. "Don't Talk to Me" (Mickey Jupp)
4. "Every Time I See Her" (Rick Bell, Michael Lanning)
5. "Stockholm" (Chris East, Mickey Jupp)
6. "King of Love" (Mark Johnson)
7. "I Got Your Number" (Al Anderson, John Hiatt, Fred Koller)
8. "Never Take the Place of You" (Al Anderson)
9. "Sincerely" (Fontaine Brown)
10. "Test of Love" (Billy Burnette, Dan Navarro)
11. "Stay with Me Tonight" (Dave Edmunds, John David)

== Personnel ==
- Dave Edmunds – Guitar, Keyboards, Vocals, Background vocals, Producer
- Lee Rocker – Bass
- Phil Chen – Bass
- Chuck Leavell – Keyboards
- Jim Keltner – Drums
- Dave Charles – Percussion, Drums, Engineer
- Brian Setzer – Background vocals
- Crispin Cioe – Horn
- Robert Funk – Horn
- Jack Hale – Horn
- Arno Hecht – Horn
- Jim Horn – Horn
- Wayne Jackson – Horn
- "Hollywood" Paul Litteral – Horn
- Andrew Love – Horn
- Leslie Ann Jones – Engineer
