= Long Wave =

2012 studio album by Jeff Lynne

Studio album by Jeff Lynne
- Released: 26 September 2012 (Japan); 5 October 2012 (Europe); 8 October 2012 (UK); 9 October 2012 (US)
- Recorded: 2010–2012
- Genres: Traditional pop, rock and roll
- Length: 27:19
- Labels: Big Trilby (UK); Frontiers (US)
- Producer: Jeff Lynne

Jeff Lynne chronology
Armchair Theatre (1990)	Long Wave (2012)

Professional ratings
Review scores
Source	Rating
AllMusic	4/5 stars
Consequence of Sound	3.5/5 stars
London Evening Standard	2/5 stars

Long Wave is the second solo album recorded by Jeff Lynne released on 8 October (UK) and 9 October 2012 (US). The album contains cover versions of songs that influenced Lynne's songwriting while growing up and residing in Birmingham. It was recorded between 2010 and 2012.

The album debuted at number 7 on the UK Albums Chart and at number 1 on the UK Top 40 Independent Albums Chart, then also at number 133 on the US Billboard 200 albums chart, at number 33 on the Billboard Top Independent Albums chart and at number 48 on the Billboard Top Rock Albums chart.

== Background ==
Lynne said of the album:

"I call this new album Long Wave because all of the songs I sing on it are the ones heard on long wave radio when I was a kid growing up in Birmingham, UK. These songs take me back to that feeling of freedom in those days and summon up the feeling of first hearing those powerful waves of music coming in on my old crystal set. My dad also had the radio on all the time, so some of these songs have been stuck in my head for 50 years. You can only imagine how great it felt to finally get them out of my head after all these years."

"At Last" was scheduled to be the first UK single and "Mercy Mercy" the first US single issued from the album.

== Track listing ==
All songs performed and produced by Jeff Lynne.

No.	Title	Writer(s)	Length
1.	"She"	Charles Aznavour, Herbert Kretzmer	2:41
2.	"If I Loved You"	Richard Rodgers, Oscar Hammerstein	2:21
3.	"So Sad (To Watch Good Love Go Bad)"	Don Everly	2:33
4.	"Mercy, Mercy"	Don Covay, Ronald Alonzo Miller	2:53
5.	"Running Scared"	Roy Orbison, Joe Melson	2:10
6.	"Bewitched, Bothered and Bewildered"	Richard Rodgers, Lorenz Hart	2:20
7.	"Smile"	Charlie Chaplin, John Turner, Geoffrey Parsons	2:32
8.	"At Last"	Mack Gordon, Harry Warren	2:34
9.	"Love Is a Many-Splendored Thing"	Sammy Fain, Paul Francis Webster	2:30
10.	"Let It Rock"	Chuck Berry	1:52
11.	"Beyond the Sea"	Jack Lawrence, Charles Trenet	2:53

Japanese bonus track
No.	Title	Writer(s)	Length
12.	"Jody"	Del Shannon, Max Crook	2:51

== Charts ==
Chart (2012)	Peak position
Belgian Albums (Ultratop Flanders)	153
Belgian Albums (Ultratop Wallonia)	168
Dutch Albums (Album Top 100)	74
German Albums (Offizielle Top 100)	83
Swedish Albums (Sverigetopplistan)	24
Swiss Albums (Schweizer Hitparade)	64
UK Albums (Official Charts)	7
UK Independent Albums (Official Charts)	1
US Billboard 200	133
US Independent Albums (Billboard)	33
US Top Rock Albums (Billboard)	48
