= From Small Things (Big Things One Day Come) =

Single by Dave Edmunds

from the album D.E. 7th
- Released: 23 July 1982
- Genre: Rock
- Length: 3:30
- Label: Arista
- Songwriter: Bruce Springsteen
- Producer: Dave Edmunds

Dave Edmunds singles chronology
"The Race Is On" (1981)	"From Small Things (Big Things One Day Come)" (1982)	"Run Rudolph Run" (1982)

"From Small Things (Big Things One Day Come)" is a rock song originally written and performed by American singer and songwriter Bruce Springsteen. It was recorded in 1979 during The River sessions, but it was not released on the album. Springsteen's version was included on the 2003 bonus disc of The Essential Bruce Springsteen, and in 2015 on the box set The Ties That Bind: The River Collection.

The song was covered by Dave Edmunds in 1982, and his version of the song peaked at position 28 on the Billboard Rock Chart, released on Edmunds' album, D.E. 7th. Springsteen, a fan of Edmunds, gave the song to Edmunds after Edmunds went to one of his concerts with radio DJ Roger Scott and Springsteen invited him backstage. Edmunds, who called the song "perfect for me", recalled,

"I never met Bruce and I didn't know he knew me from anyone else, really! I went along to a gig in Wembley and I was in this backstage area, to get drinks and things like that. ... It was after the gig and I was talking to a friend of mine, a DJ, who had gotten me the tickets and said 'Come on, he's a big fan'. And I was just standing there and someone tapped me on the shoulder and it was one of the crew, and he said, 'Bruce wants to see you' and I was whisked back to the dressing room, where he was just finishing having his massage. And he said he had a song for me. ... He sang it on the spot, picked up the guitar and sang it. Then he did a tape and sent it to me."

Six months later, Springsteen and Edmunds performed the song together live at a 1982 4th of July concert Edmunds was playing. Springsteen surprised Edmunds on stage at the end of the show and the two performed Chuck Berry covers. Edmunds recalled, ""He waited patiently in the dressing room until the end of my set, and then - the audience knew something was cooking - he sauntered on stage".

PopMatters called Edmunds' version "crunchy" and an "excellent example of Edmunds at his best".

In 1990, Nitty Gritty Dirt Band covered the song for their album The Rest of the Dream on MCA Records Nashville. Their version served as lead single to the project, peaking at number 65 on the Billboard Hot Country Songs charts.
