= Get It (Dave Edmunds album) =

Studio album by Dave Edmunds
- Released: April 1977
- Studio: Rockfield, Rockfield; Pathway, London
- Genre: Rock; rockabilly
- Length: 31:38
- Label: Swan Song
- Producer: Dave Edmunds

Dave Edmunds chronology
Subtle as a Flying Mallet (1975)	Get It (1977)	Tracks on Wax 4 (1978)

Get It is the third album by Welsh rock musician Dave Edmunds, released in 1977. Some of the songs were performed by an early "trio" version of Rockpile (Edmunds, Nick Lowe and Terry Williams); others (such as "I Knew the Bride" and "Little Darlin'") were recorded by Edmunds solo. Also recorded in these sessions was the non-album Edmunds-Lowe tune "As Lovers Do", which was used as the B-side of both "Here Comes the Weekend" and the later "Crawling from the Wreckage". "New York's a Lonely Town", the B-side of "Where or When" was also recorded during the six-week sessions for the album.

Two recordings that appear on Get It were from much earlier sessions. "Ju Ju Man" was recorded in 1975, while "My Baby Left Me' dated back to 1969, and was performed by Edmunds backed with members of his band Love Sculpture: Mickey Gee, John Williams and Terry Williams.

== Critical reception ==
Professional ratings
Review scores
Source	Rating
AllMusic	4.5/5 stars
Christgau's Record Guide	B+
(The New) Rolling Stone Album Guide	3.5/5 stars

The New York Times called the album "an amusing disk" and "a compendium of rock styles all the way back to rockabilly."

== Track listing ==
1. "Get Out of Denver" (Bob Seger) – 2:17
2. "I Knew the Bride" (Nick Lowe) – 2:57
3. "Back to School Days" (Graham Parker) – 2:47
4. "Here Comes the Weekend" (Dave Edmunds, Lowe) – 1:59
5. "Worn Out Suits, Brand New Pockets" (Edmunds) – 2:25
6. "Where or When" (Richard Rodgers, Lorenz Hart) – 2:20
7. "Ju Ju Man" (Jim Ford, Lolly Vegas) – 3:23
8. "Get It" (Bob Kelly) – 2:20
9. "Let's Talk About Us" (Otis Blackwell) – 2:12
10. "Hey Good Lookin'" (Hank Williams) – 1:55
11. "What Did I Do Last Night?" (Lowe) – 1:48
12. "Little Darlin'" (Edmunds, Lowe) – 3:18
13. "My Baby Left Me" (Arthur Crudup) – 1:57

== Personnel ==
- Dave Edmunds – vocals, all guitars, bass, keyboards, drums
- Nick Lowe – bass
- Terry Williams – drums
- Bob Andrews – keyboards, accordion
- Steve Goulding – drums
- Billy Rankin – drums
- Paul Riley – bass

== Charts ==
Chart (1977–78)	Peak position
Australian Albums (Kent Music Report)	31
Swedish Albums (Sverigetopplistan)	42
US Bubbling Under the Top LPs (Billboard)	9
