= Tracks on Wax 4 =

Studio album by Dave Edmunds
- Released: 8 September 1978
- Recorded: March 1978
- Studio: Eden, London
- Genre: Rock and roll; rockabilly; country rock
- Length: 33:43
- Label: Swan Song
- Producer: Dave Edmunds

Dave Edmunds chronology
Get It (1977)	Tracks on Wax 4 (1978)	Repeat When Necessary (1979)

Tracks on Wax 4 is the fourth album by Welsh rock musician Dave Edmunds. The record was the first Edmunds solo effort to feature all four members of the band Rockpile: Edmunds, Billy Bremner (who also wrote two of the album's songs under the pen name Billy Murray), Nick Lowe, and Terry Williams.

The album's eighth song, "Thread Your Needle", was originally recorded by the Ohio-based R&B duo Dean & Jean (Welton Young and Brenda Lee Jones). The album's final song, "Heart of the City", was originally recorded by Nick Lowe as a Stiff Records single in 1976. A live version performed by Rockpile was released on Lowe's album Jesus of Cool (also 1978) and Edmunds used the same backing track, but overdubbed his own lead vocals in place of Lowe's.

== Critical reception ==
Professional ratings
Review scores
Source	Rating
AllMusic	4.5/5 stars
The Rolling Stone Album Guide	3.5/5 stars
The Village Voice	A−

The Globe and Mail wrote that "Edmunds brings a wide range of historical fifties sounds to life with amazing precision."

== Track listing ==
Side one

1. "Trouble Boys" (Billy Murray) – 3:02
2. "Never Been in Love" (Nick Lowe, Rockpile) – 2:28
3. "Not a Woman, Not a Child" (Billy Murray, Ray Peters) – 3:21
4. "Television" (Lowe) – 3:19
5. "What Looks Best on You" (Lowe, Edmunds) – 2:26
6. "Readers Wives" (Noel Brown) – 3:11

Side two

1. "Deborah" (Lowe, Edmunds) – 2:38
2. "Thread Your Needle" (Brenda Lee Jones, Welton Young) – 3:27
3. "A1 on the Jukebox" (Edmunds, Will Birch) – 3:15
4. "It's My Own Business" (Chuck Berry) – 3:56
5. "Heart of the City" (Lowe) – 3:03

== Personnel ==
- Dave Edmunds – guitar, piano, vocals
- Billy Bremner – guitar
- Terry Williams – drums
- Nick Lowe – bass
- Gerry Hogan – pedal steel guitar
- Pete Kelly – piano

== Charts ==
Chart (1978)	Peak position
Australian Albums (Kent Music Report)	93
Swedish Albums (Sverigetopplistan)	17
US Bubbling Under the Top LPs (Billboard)	2
