= Julianna Raye =

American singer-songwriter

Julianna Raye is an American songwriter, singer, actress, entrepreneur, and mindfulness teacher.

== Music ==
She became briefly well known in 1993 when her work as a backing singer and songwriter persuaded producer Jeff Lynne and Warner Bros. Records executive Lenny Waronker to give her a major label debut album release on Reprise Records for the album Something Peculiar.

Despite Warner's backing, and Jeff Lynne as producer the 1993 album failed to make a commercial impact and it was not until 2002 that Raye attempted a comeback with a rock pop album Restless Night, produced by Ethan Johns, known for his work with Ryan Adams, Whiskeytown, and Linda Ronstadt, on John's independent label 3 Crows Music. She was the opening act for Don Henley and Stevie Nicks.

She released a third album, Dominoes, in 2009. A long-term project Hush had a sampler promo EP of 4 tracks from the work-in-progress issued in 2014; the completed full-length album was released digitally in 2025.

== Mindfulness ==
In 2016, Raye, along with Dave Dennis, Harold Abilock, and Donald W. McCormick, Ph.D., founded Unified Mindfulness LLC and UM-HUB LLC, which create and offer mindfulness programs (e.g., CORE) and mindfulness teacher-training programs (e.g., Foundations and Pathways). Both companies are committed to employing mindfulness methods that are based in research. They principally teach the Unified Mindfulness meditation system developed by Shinzen Young.

== Discography ==
- Something Peculiar (1993)
- Restless Night (2001)
- Dominoes (2009)
- Hush (2025)
