= Rockpile (album) =

Studio album by Dave Edmunds
- Released: January 1972
- Recorded: 1970–1971
- Studio: Rockfield, Wales
- Genre: Rock and roll, country, R&B
- Label: Regal Zonophone (UK); MAM (U.S.); Repertoire (Germany 2001 CD release)
- Producer: Dave Edmunds

Dave Edmunds chronology
Rockpile (1972)	Subtle as a Flying Mallet (1975)

Professional ratings
Review scores
Source	Rating
AllMusic	4/5 stars
Christgau's Record Guide	B+
The New Rolling Stone Album Guide	3/5 stars

Rockpile is the first solo album by Dave Edmunds, released in 1972. It is principally focused on remakes of late 1950s and early 1960s hits, with a few new songs included. Edmunds plays almost all the instruments except for bass and backing vocals, which are played by John Williams, Edmunds' former bandmate in Love Sculpture. The album included a 1970 British No. 1 and worldwide Top 10 single, "I Hear You Knocking". A 2001 reissue of the album includes both sides of Edmunds' three pre-album singles as bonus tracks.

== Track listing ==
1. "Down Down Down" (Trevor Burton) – 2:52
2. "I Hear You Knocking" (Dave Bartholomew) – 2:48
3. "Hell of a Pain" (John Williams, Dave Edmunds) – 2:55
4. "It Ain't Easy" (Ron Davies) – 3:11
5. "Promised Land" (Chuck Berry) – 2:37
6. "Dance Dance Dance" (Neil Young) – 2:58
7. "(I'm a) Lover Not a Fighter" (Ron Collier) – 3:33
8. "Egg or the Hen" (Willie Dixon) – 4:15
9. "Sweet Little Rock & Roller" (Chuck Berry) – 2:39
10. "Outlaw Blues" (Bob Dylan) – 5:09

Bonus tracks (2001 reissue)

1. "I Hear You Knocking" (single mix) (Bartholomew, King) – 2:48
2. "Black Bill" (Dave Edmunds) – 3:09
3. "I'm Coming Home" (arr. Dave Edmunds) – 3:02
4. "Country Roll" (Dave Edmunds) – 3:11
5. "Blue Monday" (Dave Bartholomew, Fats Domino) – 2:51
6. "I'll Get Along" (John Williams) – 2:50

== Charts ==
Chart (1972)	Peak position
Australian (Kent Music Report)	22

== Personnel ==
- Dave Edmunds – vocals, guitars, bass, keyboards, drums
- John Williams – bass, backing vocals
- Andy Fairweather Low – guitar and drums on "Egg or the Hen"
- Terry Williams – drums on "Down Down Down" and "Outlaw Blues"
- B. J. Cole – pedal steel guitar on "Down Down Down", "Dance Dance Dance" and "Outlaw Blues"
