= Armchair Theatre (album) =

Studio album by Jeff Lynne
- Released: 12 June 1990
- Recorded: Posh Studios, England 1989-1990
- Genre: Roots rock
- Length: 36:41
- Label: Reprise
- Producer: Jeff Lynne

Jeff Lynne chronology
A Message from the Country – The Jeff Lynne Years 1968/1973 (1989)	Armchair Theatre (1990)	Long Wave (2012)

Professional ratings
Review scores
Source	Rating
AllMusic	4/5 stars
Entertainment Weekly	B−
Goldmine	3/5 stars
Los Angeles Times	3/5 stars
MusicHound Rock	3.5/5 stars
Q	3/5 stars
Rolling Stone	3/5 stars

Armchair Theatre is the first solo album by Jeff Lynne, released in 1990.

== History ==
The album reunited Lynne with Electric Light Orchestra's keyboard player Richard Tandy and featured fellow Traveling Wilburys member George Harrison (both Harrison and the Wilburys were signed to Warner Bros. Records, parent of Reprise Records which released this album). Lynne wrote and recorded "Now You're Gone" as a tribute to his late mother. The album also features cover versions of two classics: "September Song" and "Stormy Weather".

The songs "Every Little Thing" and "Lift Me Up" were released as singles, both featuring non-album b-sides, "I'm Gone" from the former and "Borderline" and "Sirens" from the latter. Despite positive reviews the album became only a minor hit.

A remaster by Frontiers was released on 19 April 2013 in the UK, and on 23 April 2013 in the US, and included two bonus tracks, one of them being previously unreleased. An additional bonus track was included in the Japanese re-release.

== Track listing ==
All songs written by Jeff Lynne, except where noted.

No.	Title	Writer(s)	Length
1.	"Every Little Thing"		3:41
2.	"Don't Let Go"	Jesse Stone	3:00
3.	"Lift Me Up"		3:36
4.	"Nobody Home"		3:51
5.	"September Song"	Maxwell Anderson, Kurt Weill	2:57
6.	"Now You're Gone"		3:57
7.	"Don't Say Goodbye"		3:09
8.	"What Would It Take"		2:40
9.	"Stormy Weather"	Ted Koehler, Harold Arlen	3:42
10.	"Blown Away"	Lynne, Tom Petty	3:29
11.	"Save Me Now" (A)		2:39
Total length:			36:41

2013 remaster bonus tracks
No.	Title	Length
12.	"Borderline" (Recorded 1989; previously unreleased version. Original version previously released as non-album track on "Lift Me Up" 12" and CD single.)	2:24
13.	"Forecast" (Recorded 1989; previously unreleased song.)	3:54
Total length:		42:26

2013 remaster additional Japanese bonus track
No.	Title	Length
14.	"Strange Magic" (Live from Bungalow Palace)	3:02

- A "Save Me Now" ends at minute 1:53. After 15 seconds of silence (1:53 – 2:08), an unusual whirring sound and seagull cawing are heard for 13 seconds. After the whirring sound there are 10 seconds of silence, followed by Jeff Lynne saying "Hey, it's still going y'know," and chimes ringing.

== Personnel ==
- Jeff Lynne – guitars, bass, piano, keyboards, autoharp, percussion, lead vocals, backing vocals; drums on 5 and bonus track 13
- George Harrison – acoustic guitar on 1, 3 and 5; electric slide guitar on 3, 5 and 9; backing vocals on 1 and 3
- Richard Tandy – acoustic guitar on 1 and 3; piano on 5 and 9; backing vocals on 2, 5, 9 and 10
- Mette Mathiesen – drums on 1–4 and 6–10; percussion on 1, 2, and 6; backing vocals on 5, 9 and 10
- Phil Hatton – backing vocals on 1–5, 7, 9 and 10

Additional musicians

- Jim Horn – saxophones on 1 and 2
- Hema Desai – operatic vocals on 1, classical Indian vocals on 6
- Michael Kamen – string arrangements on 1 and 9
- Jake Commander – backing vocals on 2, 5, 9 and 10
- Dave Morgan – backing vocals on 3, 5, 9 and 10
- Sireesh K. Lalwani – percussion on 3 and 6, violin on 6
- Fateh Singh Gangani, Nellai D. Kanan, Vikram A. Patil – percussion on 3 and 6
- Rita – saw on 5
- Sheila Tandy – backing vocals on 5, 9 and 10
- Ashit Desai – classical Indian vocals on 6
- Del Shannon – backing vocals on 10

== Charts ==
Chart performance for Armchair Theatre
Chart (1990)	Peak position
Australian Albums (ARIA)	35
Canada Top Albums/CDs (RPM)	23
Dutch Albums (Album Top 100)	44
German Albums (Offizielle Top 100)	52
Norwegian Albums (VG-lista)	7
Swedish Albums (Sverigetopplistan)	8
UK Albums (Official Charts)	24
US Billboard 200	83
