= Riff Raff (album) =

Studio album by Dave Edmunds
- Released: September 1984
- Studio: Maison Rouge, London
- Genre: Rock, synth-pop
- Label: Arista (UK); Columbia (US)
- Producer: Dave Edmunds, Jeff Lynne

Dave Edmunds chronology
Information (1983)	Riff Raff (1984)	Closer to the Flame (1989)

Alternative cover
- US/Canada cover.

Professional ratings
Review scores
Source	Rating
AllMusic	2/5 stars
The Rolling Stone Album Guide	2.5/5 stars

Riff Raff is a 1984 album by the Welsh rock musician Dave Edmunds. The album was his third release for Arista Records (in the UK) and Columbia Records (in the US), following 1983's Information.

== Overview ==
Riff Raff continued Edmunds' collaboration with Electric Light Orchestra frontman Jeff Lynne; Lynne produced six tracks on the albums, and wrote three of the songs.

The majority of the tracks on Riff Raff are originals by Lynne, Edmunds, and band member John David. The most notable cover is the aforementioned "Something About You", originally a top-20 hit for the Four Tops in 1965. Edmunds also covered the Paul Brady-penned "Steel Claw" which was originally recorded, with a tighter, more frenetic hard rock arrangement, by Tina Turner for her multi-platinum comeback effort, Private Dancer, released just four months prior.

== Reception ==
Compared to the Edmund's success with Information (which hit No. 51 on the Billboard 200 album chart and spawned a top-40 single in "Slipping Away"), Riff Raff was a commercial flop. The album made it to only No. 140.

"Something About You" failed to crack the Billboard Hot 100 (although it did hit No. 16 on the Mainstream Rock Tracks chart).

Riff Raff was the last time Edmunds and Lynne would collaborate on record. Edmunds wouldn't make another studio album for five years (although he would release a live album in the interim).

== Track listing ==
1. "Something About You" (Lamont Dozier, Eddie Holland, Brian Holland) – 3:03
2. "Breaking Out" (Jeff Lynne) – 3:26
3. "Busted Loose" (Paul Brady) – 4:33
4. "Far Away" (Jeff Lynne) – 4:11
5. "Rules of the Game" (John David) – 4:10
6. "Steel Claw" (Paul Brady) – 4:18
7. "S.O.S." (Jeff Lynne) – 3:14
8. "Hang On" (Steve Gould) – 3:24
9. "How Could I Be So Wrong" (John David) – 3:20
10. "Can't Get Enough" (Dave Edmunds) – 3:08

== Personnel ==
- Dave Edmunds - guitar, vocals
- Jeff Lynne
- John David - bass
- Paul Jones - harmonica
- Richard Tandy - keyboards
- Terry Williams - drums
- Gered Mankowitz - photography

== Charts ==
Chart (1984)	Peak position
Swedish Albums (Sverigetopplistan)	26
US Billboard 200	140
