= Something About You (Four Tops song) =

Single by Four Tops

from the album Four Tops' Second Album
- B-side: "Darling I Hum Our Song"
- Released: 1965
- Recorded: 1965
- Studio: Hitsville U.S.A., Detroit
- Genre: Soul, pop
- Length: 2:48
- Label: Motown
- Songwriter: Holland–Dozier–Holland
- Producers: Brian Holland; Lamont Dozier

Four Tops singles chronology
"It's the Same Old Song" (1965)	"Something About You" (1965)	"Shake Me, Wake Me (When It's Over)" (1966)

"Something About You" is a song written by Holland-Dozier-Holland and was first released by the Four Tops on their 1965 album Four Tops' Second Album.

== History ==
"Something About You" was released as the third single from the Four Tops' Second Album, following "I Can't Help Myself" and "It's the Same Old Song". The song reached #19 on the Billboard Hot 100 and #9 on the Billboard R&B chart. The B-side of the single was "Darling I Hum Our Song." "Something About You" has appeared on numerous compilation albums, including The Ultimate Collection.

"Something About You" is unusual for a Motown song in that a guitar riff is prominent. The Temptations' "My Girl" is one of the few other examples. The guitar riff in "Something About You" is similar to that in the Rolling Stones' "(I Can't Get No) Satisfaction," although Rikky Rooksby claims that the guitar sound in the Four Tops' song is "cleaner." David A. Carson also remarks on the clean lead guitar at the beginning of the song. Robert White of the Funk Brothers played the guitar part on "Something About You," as he did on "My Girl."

== Reception ==
Billboard said that the Four Tops had a "rhythm winner here with even more exciting sounds than their 'It's the Same Old Song' smash! " Cash Box described it as a "rollicking, fast-moving, romantic rocker about a lucky lad who is on cloud number nine since he met the girl of his dreams." Record World said that "something about 'Something About You' will rocket it high." Allmusic critic Ron Wynn praises the song as being "a great uptempo shouter." Wynn also praises its "vocal authority" and "production genius." Author Bill Dahl praised the song's "crackling shuffle rhythm" and the way lead singer Levi Stubbs emotes "over punchy horns and low-end guitar." Rolling Stone Magazine critic Dave Marsh rated "Something About You" to be one of the top 1001 singles of all time. Marsh praised the song's sense of urgency, claiming that rhythm and blues is about "the kind of emotional expansiveness that erupts from these grooves, the pure tension between Motown formula and Levi's [lead singer Levi Stubbs'] uncontrollable passions."

== Covers ==
Dave Edmunds covered the song on his 1984 album Riff Raff, the song hit #16 on the Billboard Mainstream Rock chart. Other covers were released on albums by Phil Collins, Frankie Miller, Quincy Jones, Graham Bonnet, The Grass Roots, Leblanc and Carr, Cilla Black, Vonda Shepard and also as a 1967 single by Australian group The Vibrants.

== Personnel ==
- Lead vocals by Levi Stubbs
- Backing vocals by Abdul "Duke" Fakir, Lawrence Payton, and Renaldo Benson
- Additional backing vocals by The Andantes
- Instrumentation by The Funk Brothers
  - Mike Terry: baritone saxophone
