= Repeat When Necessary =

Studio album by Dave Edmunds
- Released: 8 June 1979
- Recorded: 1978
- Studio: Eden, London
- Genre: Rock
- Length: 34:10
- Label: Swan Song
- Producer: Dave Edmunds

Dave Edmunds chronology
Tracks on Wax 4 (1978)	Repeat When Necessary (1979)	Twangin... (1981)

Repeat When Necessary is the fifth album by Welsh rock musician Dave Edmunds. Produced by Edmunds, it was released in 1979 by Swan Song Records. It was recorded and released at the same time as Nick Lowe's Labour of Lust, and features the same lineup of musicians: Edmunds, Lowe, Billy Bremner and Terry Williams.

== Content ==
"Girls Talk", written by Elvis Costello, Graham Parker's "Crawling from the Wreckage" and the Hank DeVito-penned "Queen of Hearts" are among the highlights of this album. Juice Newton would cover "Queen of Hearts" in an arrangement virtually identical to Edmunds' on Juice, her 1981 breakthrough album.

Other covers on the album include "Dynamite" (originally recorded by Cliff Richard (1959)) and "Take Me for a Little While" (originally recorded by Evie Sands and later covered by Jackie Ross (1965), Dusty Springfield and Vanilla Fudge). "Home in My Hand" had been recorded seven years previously by Nick Lowe's old band, Brinsley Schwarz. "Bad Is Bad", written by Huey Lewis, would later be recorded by Lewis and his band the News for their 1983 multi-platinum album Sports.

== Critical reception ==
Professional ratings
Review scores
Source	Rating
AllMusic	4.5/5 stars
Music Week	3/4 stars
The Rolling Stone Album Guide	4/5 stars
Smash Hits	7/10
The Village Voice	A−
DownBeat	4/5 stars

The Globe and Mail wrote that "Edmund's pub-crawling rock doesn't wear thin if you're sipping and stomping along, but in the confines of your living room his Chuck Berry retakes are liable to send you back to an old Berry collection to find out where he copped the licks."

DownBeat assigned the album 4 stars.

== Track listing ==
Side one

1. "Girls Talk" (Elvis Costello) – 3:25
2. "Crawling from the Wreckage" (Graham Parker) – 2:53
3. "The Creature from the Black Lagoon" (Billy Bremner) – 3:52
4. "Sweet Little Lisa" (Donivan Cowart, Martin Cowart, Hank DeVito) – 3:38
5. "Dynamite" (Ian Samwell) – 2:33

Side two

1. "Queen of Hearts" (Hank DeVito) – 3:17
2. "Home in My Hand" (Ronnie Self) – 3:20
3. "Goodbye Mr. Good Guy" (Pat Meager, Bremner) – 2:40
4. "Take Me for a Little While" (Trade Martin) – 2:39
5. "We Were Both Wrong" (Bremner) – 2:42
6. "Bad Is Bad" (Alex Call, John Ciambotti, Sean Hopper, Huey Lewis, John McFee, Michael Schriener) – 3:11

== Personnel ==
- Dave Edmunds – guitars, piano and vocals
- Billy Bremner – guitar and backing vocals
- Nick Lowe – bass and backing vocals
- Terry Williams – drums

Additional personnel

- Huey Lewis – harmonica on "Bad Is Bad"
- Albert Lee – guitar on "Sweet Little Lisa"
- Roger Bechirian – piano on "Girls Talk"

== Charts ==
Chart (1979–80)	Peak position
Australian Albums (Kent Music Report)	37
New Zealand Albums (RMNZ)	45
Swedish Albums (Sverigetopplistan)	17
UK Albums (OCC)	39
US Billboard 200	54

== Certifications ==
Region	Certification	Certified units/sales
United Kingdom (BPI)	Silver	60,000^{^}
^{^} Shipments figures based on certification alone.
