= Dave Edmunds =

Welsh singer, songwriter, guitarist, and record producer (born 1944)

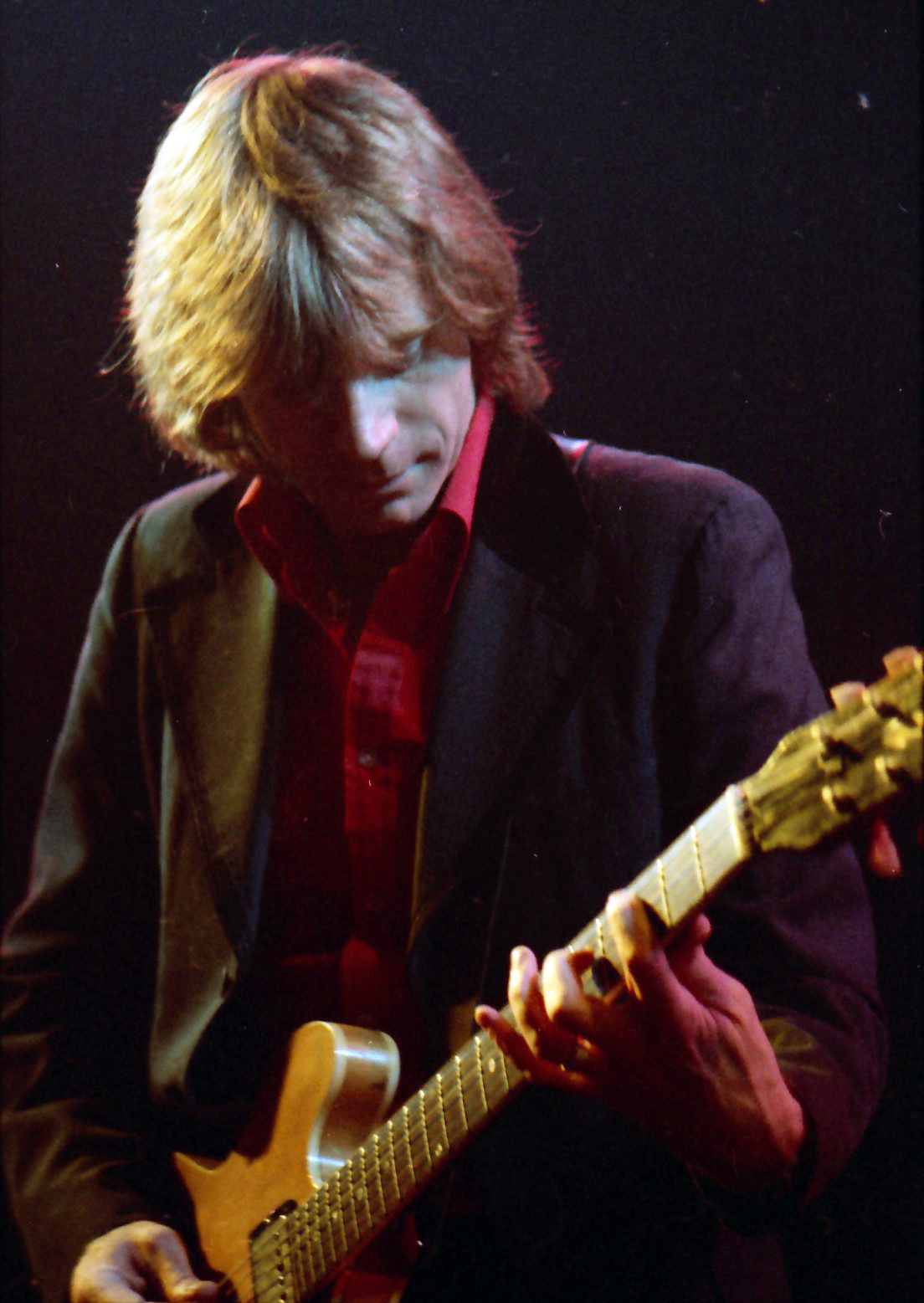
- Edmunds performing with Rockpile at the Danforth Music Hall in Toronto, 1980

Background information
- Born: David William Edmunds; 15 April 1944 (age 82); Cardiff, Wales
- Genres: Rock and roll; rockabilly; blues rock; country rock; roots rock; pub rock; power pop; new wave
- Occupations: Musician; singer; songwriter; record producer
- Instruments: Vocals; guitar
- Years active: 1957–2017
- Labels: Regal Zonophone; MAM; RCA; Swan Song; Arista; Columbia; Sony Music; EMI ManhattanCapitol
- Formerly of: Love Sculpture; Rockpile; Ringo Starr & His All-Starr Band

David William Edmunds (born 15 April 1944) is a Welsh retired singer, songwriter, guitarist and record producer. He is mainly associated with pub rock and new wave, having produced hits in these genres during the 1970s and early 1980s.

Edmunds first played in a band with his older brother Geoff when he was 10. This led to a succession of bands with other musicians. In 1968, he was a member of Love Sculpture, which had a Top 5 hit with Sabre Dance. Edmunds embarked on a solo career after Love Sculpture. His 1970 Christmas single "I Hear You Knocking" was certified gold and sold more than three million copies.

In 1976, Edmunds formed the group Rockpile with Nick Lowe, Billy Bremner and Terry Williams. Due to contractual arrangements, the group did not record as Rockpile until 1980. Between 1976 and 1980, Edmunds enjoyed success with Nick Lowe's "I Knew the Bride", Elvis Costello's "Girls Talk", Hank DeVito's "Queen of Hearts", Graham Parker's "Crawling from the Wreckage", and Melvin Endsley's "Singing the Blues". After Rockpile released their first LP under their own name, Seconds of Pleasure (1980), the band split. Edmunds spent the 1980s collaborating with and producing an assortment of artists, including Paul McCartney, King Kurt, Stray Cats, Fabulous Thunderbirds, and Status Quo. His 1983 release, Information produced a US Top 40 hit with "Slipping Away". It was followed in 1984 by the album Riff Raff.

Edmunds recorded less frequently after the mid-1980s. In 2013, he released a compilation album "...Again" followed, in 2015, with an instrumental album On Guitar... Dave Edmunds: Rags & Classics. After playing a final show in July 2017, he was reported to have retired from the music business.

== Career ==
=== Early life ===
Edmunds was born 15 April 1944 in Cardiff, Wales. As a ten-year-old, he first played in 1954 with a band called the Edmunds Bros Duo with his older brother Geoff (born 5 December 1939, Cardiff); this was a piano duo. Then the brothers were in the Stompers, later called the Heartbeats, formed around 1957 with Geoff Edmunds and Allan Goldsworty on rhythm guitars, Dave on lead guitar, Denny Driscoll on lead vocals, Johnny Stark on drums, and Tom Edwards on bass. Then Dave and Geoff were in the 99ers along with scientist and writer Brian J. Ford. After that Dave Edmunds was in Crick Feathers' Hill-Bills formed in about 1960, with Edmunds ("Feathers") on lead guitar, Zee Dolan on bass, Tennessee Tony on lead vocals, Tony Kees on piano and Hank Two Sticks on drums. The first group that Edmunds fronted was the Cardiff-based 1950s style rockabilly trio the Raiders formed in 1961, along with Brian 'Rockhouse' Davies on bass (born 15 January 1943, Cardiff) and Ken Collier on drums. Edmunds was the only constant member of the group, which later included bassist Mick Still, Bob 'Congo' Jones on drums (b. 13 August 1946, Barry, South Wales) and John Williams (stage name John David) on bass. The Raiders worked almost exclusively in the South Wales area.

In 1966, after a short spell in a Parlophone recording band called the Image (1965–1966) with local drummer Tommy Riley, Edmunds shifted to a more blues-rock sound, reuniting with Congo Jones and bassist John Williams and adding second guitarist Mickey Gee to form the short-lived Human Beans, a band that played mostly in London and on the UK university circuit. In 1967, the band recorded a cover of "Morning Dew" on the British Columbia label that failed to have any chart impact. After just eighteen months, the core of Human Beans formed a new band called Love Sculpture that again reinstated Edmunds, Jones and Williams as a trio. Love Sculpture released their debut single "River to Another Day" in 1968. Their second single was a quasi-novelty Top 5, a reworking of Khachaturian's classical piece "Sabre Dance" as a speed-crazed rock number, inspired by Keith Emerson's classical rearrangements. "Sabre Dance" became a hit after garnering the enthusiastic attention of British DJ John Peel, who was so impressed that he played it twice in one programme on "Top Gear". The band issued two albums.

=== Solo career ===
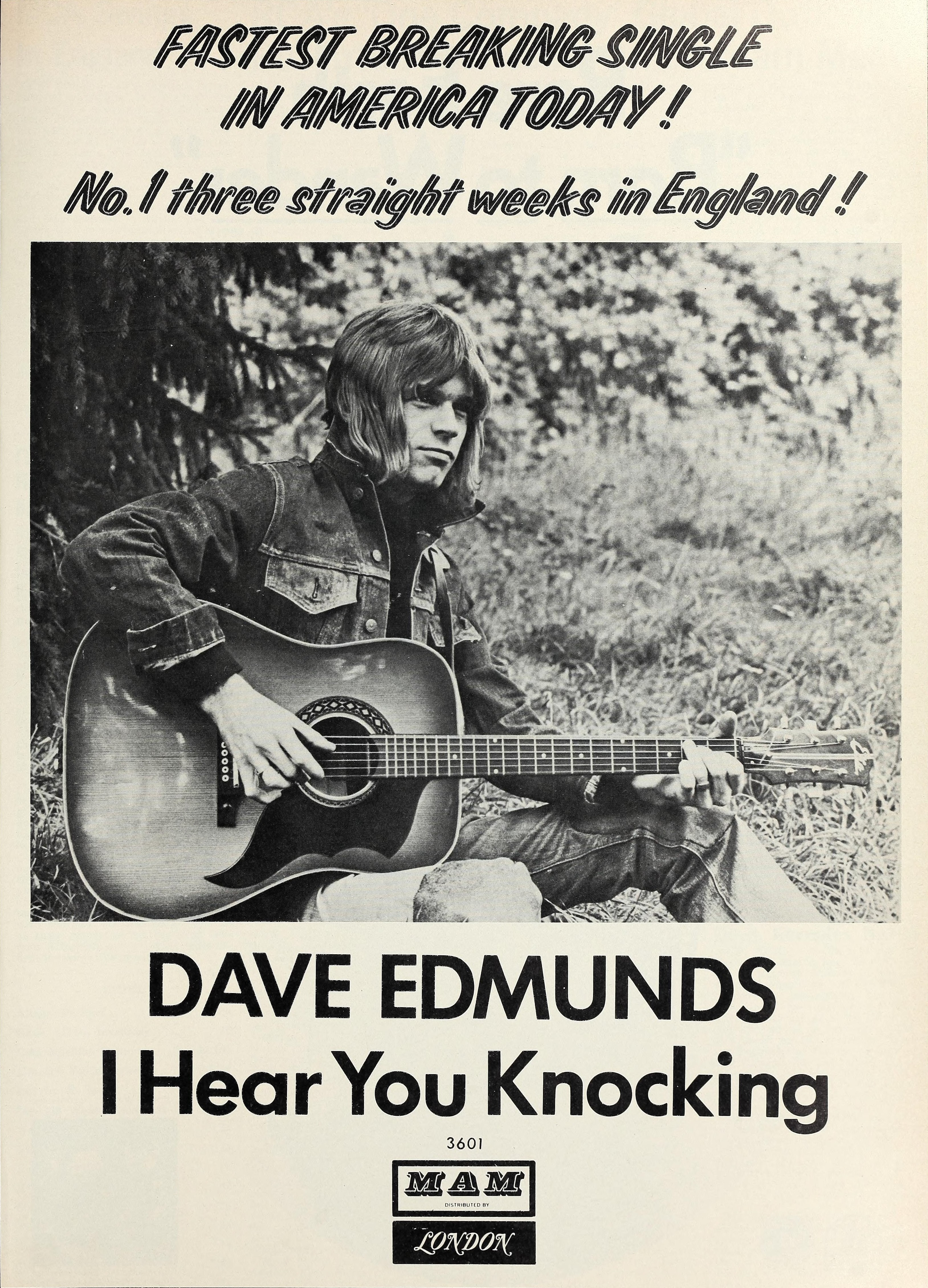
Cashbox advertisement, 19 December 1970

After Love Sculpture split, Edmunds had a UK Christmas Number 1 single in 1970 with "I Hear You Knocking", a Smiley Lewis cover, which he came across while producing Shakin' Stevens and the Sunsets' first album titled A Legend. The recording was the first release on Edmunds' manager's MAM Records label. This single also reached No. 4 in the US, making it Edmunds' biggest hit by far on either side of the Atlantic Ocean. It sold more than three million copies, and was awarded a gold disc. Edmunds had intended to record Wilbert Harrison's "Let's Work Together", but when he was beaten to that song by Canned Heat, he adapted the arrangement he intended to use for it to "I Hear You Knocking". The success of the single caused EMI's Regal Zonophone Records to use an option that it had to claim Edmunds' album, 1972's Rockpile, and the momentum from the single's success on a different label went away.

Edmunds' only acting role followed, as a band member in the David Essex movie Stardust. After learning the trade of producer, culminating in a couple of singles in the style of Phil Spector, "Baby I Love You" (No. 8 in the chart) and "Born to Be with You" (No. 5 in the chart), he became linked with the pub rock movement of the early 1970s, producing (among others) Brinsley Schwarz, Ducks Deluxe, Flamin' Groovies, and blues rock band Foghat, using a stripped down, grittier sound.

Edmunds had bought a house in Rockfield, Monmouth, a few miles away from Charles and Kingsley Ward's Rockfield Studios, where he became an almost permanent fixture for the next twenty years. His working regimen involved arriving at the studio in the early evening and working until well after dawn, usually locked in the building alone. Applying the layered Spector Wall of Sound to his own productions, it was not unusual for Edmunds to multilayer up to forty separately recorded guitar tracks into the mix.

=== Rockpile and other collaborations ===
His own solo LP from 1975, Subtle as a Flying Mallet, was similar in style. The Brinsley Schwarz connection brought about a collaboration with Nick Lowe starting with this album, and in 1976 they formed the group Rockpile, with Billy Bremner and Terry Williams. Because Edmunds and Lowe signed to different record labels that year, they could not record as Rockpile until 1980, but many of their solo LPs (such as Lowe's Labour of Lust and Edmunds' own Repeat When Necessary) were group recordings. Edmunds had more UK hits during this time, including Nick Lowe's "I Knew the Bride", Elvis Costello's "Girls Talk", Hank DeVito's "Queen of Hearts" (later a larger, international hit for American country-rock singer Juice Newton), Graham Parker's "Crawling from the Wreckage", and Melvin Endsley's "Singing the Blues" (originally a 1956 US Country No. 1 hit for Marty Robbins, then a US pop No. 1 cover for Guy Mitchell, and a UK No. 1 for both Mitchell and Tommy Steele).

The album Repeat When Necessary received a Silver Certification from the British Phonographic Industry on 20 March 1980 (for over 60,000 copies sold in the UK). The single "Girls Talk" also received a Silver Certificate from the BPI. Edmunds, with Rockpile, performed in a music video for "Girls Talk", directed by Martin Pitts and produced by Derek Burbidge and Helen Pollack. For the video, the band set up on the roof of the Warner Brothers Records building in Midtown Manhattan in the early afternoon. Unexpectedly, after Rockpile released their first LP under their own name, Seconds of Pleasure (1980), the band split. Edmunds spent the 1980s collaborating with and producing an assortment of artists, including Paul McCartney, King Kurt, Stray Cats, Fabulous Thunderbirds, and Status Quo.

On his 1983 release, Information, Edmunds collaborated on two songs with Jeff Lynne, the leader of Electric Light Orchestra. One of these songs, a Lynne composition, "Slipping Away", became Edmunds' only other US Top 40 hit, spending a single week at No. 39 while having a video clip in heavy rotation on MTV. It was not a hit in the UK. In 1984, Lynne produced six tracks on Edmunds' following album, Riff Raff. He also recorded the soundtrack for the movie Porky's Revenge!, supplying the main theme, "High School Nights."

In late 1985, Dave Edmunds was the musical director and a participating band member of Carl Perkins's Blue Suede Shoes: A Rockabilly Session television special recorded live at Limehouse Studios in London. Other musicians involved in the project included George Harrison, Ringo Starr, Eric Clapton and Rosanne Cash. In 1989, Edmunds produced the album Yo Frankie for Dion.

=== 1990 onwards ===
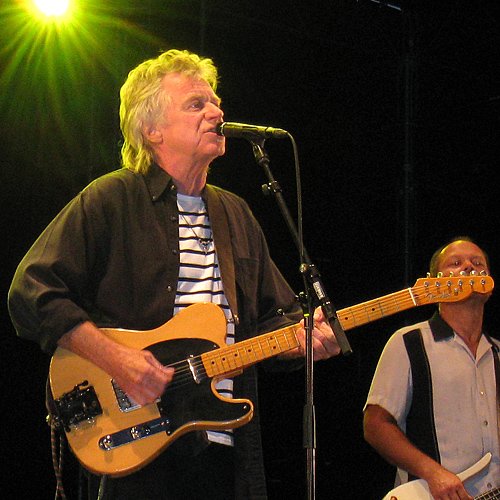
Edmunds playing in Sweden 2008

Edmunds recorded less frequently after the mid-1980s, living in Wales in semi-retirement but occasionally touring. He joined up with Ringo Starr & His All-Starr Band for tours in 1992 and 2000. However, 2007 marked a return to touring for Edmunds alongside Joe Brown on a lengthy UK tour. He made an appearance on stage alongside Stray Cats at the Brixton Academy in London on 10 September 2008, playing "The Race Is On" and "Tear It Up" with the band.

In 1993 Edmunds was in Cardiff Crown Court as a co-defendant along with Shakin' Stevens facing charges of non-payment of playing royalties from former Sunsets' band members Robert Llewellyn, Carl Petersen, Steve Percy, and Paul Dolan. The prosecution asserted that the former band members were due a share of additional royalties that Stevens and Edmunds had received from the successful reissue of the album A Legend during the early 1980s. The judge agreed. While the unpaid royalties only amounted to around £70,000 to be divided among the four musicians, the associated court costs to be paid by Stevens and Edmunds amounted to £500,000.

On New Year's Eve 2008, he appeared on Jools' Annual Hootenanny, performing "Girls Talk" and "I Hear You Knocking". He was Holland's guest again at Borde Hill Garden on 20 June 2009, on 28 August at an open-air concert at Carrickfergus Castle, on 31 October at Ipswich Regent, on 7 November at Stoke Victoria Hall and on 14 November at Nottingham Concert Hall. Edmunds also played a five-song set, including "I Hear You Knocking," "I Knew the Bride" and "Sabre Dance" with the Holland Big Band at the Royal Albert Hall on 27 November 2009.

He returned and performed "Sabre Dance" on Jools' Annual Hootenanny on the 2009/10 edition. An album release on 19 November 2013 called ...Again, featured recordings from the 1990s plus four new tracks. This was Edmunds' first release in almost 20 years, with the title track released as a digital download single. In 2015, Edmunds released his first instrumental album On Guitar... Dave Edmunds: Rags & Classics, which featured instrumental covers of classic songs, such as The Beach Boys' "God Only Knows" and Elton John's "Your Song". The album was Edmunds' final album, and after playing a final show in July 2017, he was reported to have retired from the music business.

== Personal life ==
In July 2025, Edmunds experienced a major cardiac arrest before being revived with CPR according to his wife Cici Edmunds. He has since recovered.

== Selected discography ==
=== Studio albums ===
with Love Sculpture:

- Blues Helping (December 1968)
- Forms and Feelings (January 1970)

with Rockpile:

- Seconds of Pleasure (October 1980)

as Dave Edmunds:

Year	Album	Peak chart positions				Certifications
Year	Album	UK	US	SWE	NZ	Certifications
1972	Rockpile	—	—	—	—	
1975	Subtle as a Flying Mallet	—	—	—	—	
1977	Get It	—	—	42	—	
1978	Tracks on Wax 4	—	—	17	—	
1979	Repeat When Necessary	39	54	17	45	BPI: Silver
1981	Twangin...	37	48	5	—	
1982	D.E. 7th	60	46	13	—	
1983	Information	92	51	20	—	
1984	Riff Raff	—	140	26	—	
1989	Closer to the Flame	—	146	36	—	
1994	Plugged In	—	—	—	—	
1999	Hand Picked: Musical Fantasies	—	—	—	—	
2013	...Again	—	—	—	—	
2015	On Guitar...Rags & Classics	—	—	—	—	
"—" denotes releases that did not chart or were not released in that territory.

=== Live albums ===
- I Hear You Rockin' (January 1987) (US No. 106)
- Live on the King Biscuit Flower Hour (May 1999)
- A Pile of Rock: Live Featuring Billy Bremner, Geraint Watkins & the Refreshments (Sweden, 1999) (Pool CD018)
- C'Mon Everybody Live (Same source as King Biscuit Flower Hour – May 1999, but different tracks) (January 2004)
- Alive & Pickin' (Canadian mail order only) (February 2005)

=== Compilations ===
with Love Sculpture:

- The Classic Tracks 1968/1972 – EMI UK – 1974
- The Dave Edmunds & Love Sculpture Singles A's & B's – Harvest Heritage – EMI UK – 1980

as Dave Edmunds:

Year	Album	Peak chart positions	
Year	Album	UK	US
1982	The Best of Dave Edmunds	—	163
1993	The Dave Edmunds Anthology (1968–1990)	—	—
2004	From Small Things: The Best of Dave Edmunds	—	—
2008	The Many Sides of Dave Edmunds: The Greatest Hits and More	38	—
"—" denotes releases that did not chart.

=== Singles ===
Year	Title	Chart positions										Certifications
Year	Title	UK	AUS	CAN	US	US Main.	IRL	NLD	NOR	SWE	NZ	Certifications
1968	"Sabre Dance" (with Love Sculpture)	5	—	—	—	x	—	—	—	—	—	
1970	"I Hear You Knocking"	1	4	3	4	x	1	4	4	—	3	RIAA: Gold
1971	"I'm Comin' Home"	52 (Note: Chart position is from the official UK "Breakers List".)	—	36	75	x	—	—	—	—	—	
1971	"Blue Monday"	—	—	—	104	x	—	—	—	—	—	
1972	"The Promised Land"	—	5	—	—	x	—	—	—	—	—	
1973	"Baby I Love You"	8	48	—	—	x	6	—	—	—	—	
1973	"Born to Be With You"	5	96	—	—	x	11	2	7	—	—	
1976	"Here Comes the Weekend"	—	—	—	—	x	—	28	—	—	—	
1976	"Where or When"	—	—	—	—	x	—	—	—	—	—	
1977	"JuJu Man"	—	—	—	—	x	—	—	—	—	—	
1977	"I Knew the Bride"	26	32	—	—	x	—	—	—	—	—	
1977	"Get Out of Denver" (US only)	—	—	—	—	x	—	—	—	—	—	
1978	"Deborah"	—	—	—	—	x	—	—	—	—	—	
1978	"Television"	—	—	—	—	x	—	—	—	—	—	
1979	"A1 on the Jukebox"	—	—	—	—	x	—	—	—	—	—	
1979	"Girls Talk"	4	9	18	65	x	11	24	—	—	23	BPI: Silver
1979	"Queen of Hearts"	11	59	—	—	x	12	—	—	—	—	
1979	"Crawling from the Wreckage"	59	—	—	—	x	—	—	—	—	—	
1980	"Teacher, Teacher" (by Rockpile)	—	83	31	51	x	—	—	—	—	—	
1980	"Singing the Blues"	28	67	—	—	x	19	—	—	7	—	
1981	"Almost Saturday Night"	58	—	—	54	18	—	—	—	15	—	
1981	"The Race Is On" (with Stray Cats)	34	—	—	—	—	17	—	—	—	—	
1982	"From Small Things (Big Things One Day Come)"	—	—	—	—	28	—	—	—	15	—	
1982	"Me and the Boys"	—	—	—	—	47	—	—	—	—	—	
1982	"Run Rudolph Run"	—	—	—	—	—	—	—	—	—	—	
1983	"Slipping Away"	60	—	—	39	7	—	47	—	—	—	
1983	"Information"	—	—	—	106	—	—	—	—	—	—	
1984	"Something About You"	—	—	—	—	16	—	—	—	—	—	
1985	"High School Nights"	—	—	—	91	—	—	—	—	—	—	
1987	"The Wanderer" (live)	—	—	—	—	35	—	—	—	—	—	
1990	"Closer to the Flame"	—	—	86	—	38	—	—	—	—	—	
1990	"King of Love"	68	—	—	—	—	—	—	—	—	—	
"—" denotes releases that did not chart or were not released in that territory. "x" denotes that the chart did not exist at the time.

=== Music videos ===
Year	Title	Director	Album
1979	"Girls Talk"	Martin Pitts	Repeat When Necessary
1979	"Crawling from the Wreckage"	Mike Mansfield	Repeat When Necessary
1981	"Almost Saturday Night"		Twangin...
1981	"The Race Is On"	Brian Grant	Twangin...
1982	"From Small Things (Big Things One Day Come)"		D.E. 7th
1982	"Me and the Boys"	Paul Justman	D.E. 7th
1982	"Dear Dad"		D.E. 7th
1983	"Slipping Away"	Peter Sinclair	Information
1984	"Information"	Paul Justman	Information
1984	"Something About You"	Dee Trattmann	Riff Raff
1985	"High School Nights"	Marty Callner	Porky's Revenge!
1986	"The Wanderer"	Ralph Ziman	I Hear You Rockin'
1986	"Paralyzed"		I Hear You Rockin'
1990	"Closer to the Flame"	Michael Salomon	Closer to the Flame
1990	"King of Love"	Mick Haggerty	Closer to the Flame
