= Jeff Lynne =

English musician (born 1947)

Jeff Lynne OBE
- Lynne in 2016

Background information
- Born: Jeffrey Lynne; 30 December 1947 (age 78); Birmingham, Warwickshire, England
- Genres: Rock; pop
- Occupations: Musician; singer-songwriter; record producer
- Instruments: Vocals; guitar; bass; keyboards; drums
- Years active: 1963–present
- Labels: United Artists; Jet; Harvest; Epic; Sony BMG; Reprise; Frontiers
- Member of: Electric Light Orchestra
- Formerly of: The Move; the Idle Race; Traveling Wilburys
- Spouses: Rosemary Adams (m. 1972; div. 1977) Sandi Kapelson (m. 1979; div. 1991) Camelia Kath (m. 2017)
- Website: jefflynne.com

Jeffrey Lynne (born 30 December 1947) is an English musician, singer-songwriter, and record producer. He is the co-founder and only consistent member of the rock band Electric Light Orchestra (ELO), which was formed in 1970. He has written all of the band's music since 1972, including hits such as "Evil Woman", "Livin' Thing", "Telephone Line", "Do Ya", "Rockaria!", "Mr. Blue Sky", "Shine a Little Love", "Don't Bring Me Down", and "Hold On Tight". He also has had a solo career, with two albums: Armchair Theatre (1990) and Long Wave (2012).

Born in Birmingham, Lynne became interested in music during his youth and was heavily inspired by the Beatles. He began his music career in 1963 as a member of the Andicaps, then left the group the next year to join the Chads. From 1966 to 1970, he was a founding member and principal songwriter of the Idle Race. In 1970, he accepted Roy Wood's offer to join the Move and was a major contributor to the band's last two albums. Later that year, Lynne, Wood and Bev Bevan formed the band ELO as a side project to which they intended to devote most of their energies, out of their desire to create modern rock and pop songs with classical overtones. Following Wood's departure from ELO in 1972, Lynne assumed sole leadership of the band and wrote, arranged and produced virtually all of its subsequent records. During the 1970s and 1980s, ELO released a string of top 10 albums and singles, including the band's most commercially successful album, the double album Out of the Blue (1977). Two ELO albums reached the top of the British chart: the disco-inspired Discovery (1979) and the science fiction–themed concept album Time (1981). In 1986, Lynne disbanded the group after losing interest in it, though he subsequently revived it from 2000 to 2001 and again from 2014 to 2025. Lynne produced all fifteen ELO singles that rose to the Top 10 record charts in the UK.

After ELO's original disbandment in 1986, he began producing for various artists. In 1988, under the pseudonyms Otis Wilbury and Clayton Wilbury, he co-founded the supergroup Traveling Wilburys with George Harrison, Bob Dylan, Roy Orbison and Tom Petty. Lynne co-produced the Beatles' Anthology reunion singles from John Lennon demos, "Free as a Bird" (1995), "Real Love" (1996) and "Now and Then" (2023). In 2014, Lynne re-formed ELO and resumed concert touring under the name "Jeff Lynne's ELO". Outside of ELO, Lynne's producing credits include the UK or US Top 10 albums Cloud Nine (Harrison, 1987), Mystery Girl (Orbison, 1989), Full Moon Fever (Petty, 1989), Into the Great Wide Open (Tom Petty and the Heartbreakers, 1991), Flaming Pie (Paul McCartney, 1997) and Get Up! (Bryan Adams, 2015).

In 2014, Lynne received a star on the Birmingham Walk of Stars and was awarded a star on the Hollywood Walk of Fame the following year. He received three Ivor Novello Awards, including the award for Outstanding Services to British Music. In 2017, Lynne was inducted into the Rock and Roll Hall of Fame as a member of ELO, and was appointed Officer of the Order of the British Empire in 2020.

== Early life ==
Lynne was born in Erdington, Birmingham, England, to Nancy and Philip Lynne, and grew up nearby in Shard End, Birmingham, where he attended Alderlea Boys' Secondary School. As a native of Birmingham, he still has his Brummie accent. His father bought him his first acoustic guitar for £2, which he was still playing as of 2012.

== Musical career ==
=== Early years ===
Some time in or after 1965, Lynne acquired his first item of studio recording equipment, a Bang & Olufsen 'Beocord 2000 De Luxe' stereo reel-to-reel tape recorder, which allowed multi-tracking between left and right channels. He says it "taught me how to be a producer". In 1966, Lynne joined the line-up of the Nightriders (later known as the Idle Race) as guitarist, having responded to an advertisement in the Birmingham Evening Mail.

In 1968, while performing with the Idle Race, Lynne and the other members of the band were invited to a Beatles session at Abbey Road Studios. While there, he met the Beatles during the making of The White Album, witnessing the band making it together. He spent an hour at the session, before going back to the sessions with the Idle Race. Years later, he admitted that being in the same room "caused me not to sleep for, like, three days".

In 1970, Lynne accepted an offer from friend Roy Wood to join the line-up of the more successful band the Move.

=== 1970–1986: The Move and ELO ===
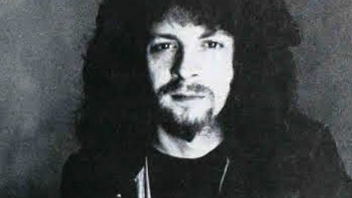
Lynne in 1973

Lynne contributed many songs to the Move's last two albums while formulating, with Roy Wood and Bev Bevan, a band built around a fusion of rock and classical music – a project which would eventually become the Electric Light Orchestra (ELO). The original idea was that both bands would exist in tandem. Bevan has, however, since suggested that Lynne had little interest in the Move, stating: "The only reason Jeff Lynne ever joined the Move was to form a new band. He was never interested in being a part of the Move."

The original aim of Electric Light Orchestra was to take up "where the Beatles had left off, and to present it on stage." John Lennon later praised the group, calling them the "sons of the Beatles" on a radio station when discussing the group's 1973 single "Showdown" on the New York radio station WNEW. Critics often compared Electric Light Orchestra to the Beatles, and they were often criticised for "ripping off" the band. Lynne admitted that he "was very influenced by the Beatles' sound of '68 and '69. That has obviously been a big influence on the way [he] looked at songwriting" and said that being compared with the Beatles was the "ultimate compliment".

The band's eponymous first album was released in December 1971, featuring heavy contributions from Lynne and Wood and producing the band's debut single "10538 Overture". Problems led to Wood's departure in 1972 (he formed the band Wizzard later that year), a year after the release of the band's first album, leaving Lynne as ELO's dominant creative force.

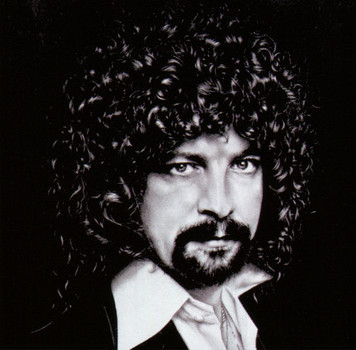
Lynne in 1977

In 1976, working as a solo artist, Lynne covered the Beatles songs "With a Little Help from My Friends" and "Nowhere Man" for the film All This and World War II. Lynne then issued his debut solo single, "Doin' That Crazy Thing", in 1977.

The pinnacle of ELO's chart success and worldwide popularity was the expansive double album Out of the Blue (1977), which was largely conceived in a Swiss chalet during a two-week writing marathon. The band's 1978 world tour featured an elaborate "space ship" set and laser light show. In order to recreate the complex instrumental textures of their albums, the band used pre-recorded supplemental backing tracks in live performances. Although that practice has now become commonplace, it caused considerable derision in the press of the time. Lynne has often stated that he prefers the creative environment of the studio to the rigours and tedium of touring. Lynne followed up the success of Out of the Blue with Discovery (1979), which held No. 1 in the UK for five weeks. The album is primarily associated with its two disco-flavoured singles ("Shine a Little Love" and "Last Train to London") and with the title's word play on "disco" and "very". However, the remaining seven non-disco tracks on the album reflected Lynne's range as a pop-rock songwriter, including a heavy, mid-tempo rock anthem ("Don't Bring Me Down") which uses a drum loop. Lynne later recalled his forays into dance music: "I love the force of disco. I love the freedom it gave me to make different rhythms across it. I enjoyed that really steady driving beat. Just steady as a rock. I've always liked that simplicity in the bass drum."

In 1979, Lynne rejected an offer for ELO to headline the Knebworth Concert in the UK, allowing Led Zeppelin to headline instead. In the absence of any touring to support Discovery, Lynne had time to contribute five tracks to the soundtrack for the 1980 film musical Xanadu. The score yielded three Top 20 singles for ELO in both the UK and the US: "I'm Alive" (UK No. 20, US No. 16), "All Over The World" (UK No. 11, US No. 13) and the title track "Xanadu", featuring Olivia Newton-John joining ELO on lead vocals, which reached number one in the UK (US No. 8). Nevertheless, Lynne was not closely involved with the development of the film, and his material consequently had only superficial attachment to the plot. Xanadu performed weakly at the box office (although it later has experienced popularity as a cult favourite). Lynne took the band in a somewhat different direction with the science-fiction themed album Time (1981), reaching number one for two weeks in the UK, producing the second top three single in less than two years. The strings were still featured, but with heavily synthesised textures. Following a marginally successful tour, Lynne kept this general approach with Secret Messages (1983) and a final contractually-obligated ELO album Balance of Power (1986). Lynne discusses the contractually-obliged nature of the final albums on the short interview included with the 'Zoom' DVD. ELO now had only three remaining official members (Lynne, Bevan and Tandy), and Lynne began devoting more time to producing.

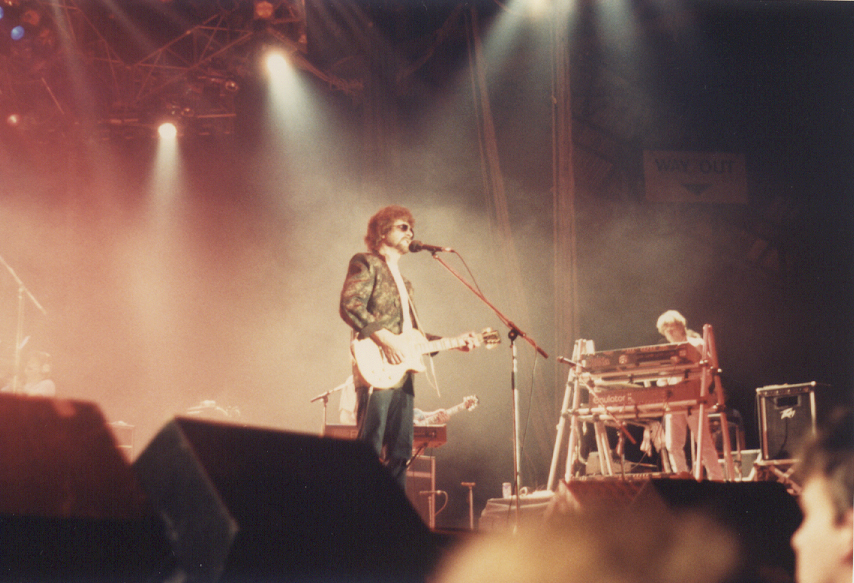
ELO performing in 1986 (Lynne and Tandy pictured)

In 1984, Lynne (working as a solo artist for the first time since 1977) contributed two original songs "Video!" and "Let It Run" to the film Electric Dreams. A third solo song, "Sooner Or Later", was released as the b-side of "Video!". Richard Tandy was a session musician on these tracks; Lynne collaborated with Tandy again in 1986 with Lynne producing the charity single "Action!" for Tandy Morgan Band.

In contrast to the dense, boomy, baroque sound of ELO, Lynne's post-ELO studio work has tended toward more minimal, acoustic instrumentation and a sparse, "organic" quality that generally favours light room ambience and colouration over artificial reverb, especially on vocals. Lynne's recordings also often feature the jangling compressed acoustic guitar sound pioneered by Roger McGuinn and a heavily gated snare drum sound.

=== 1980s: Production work ===
Even before the official end of ELO, Lynne began his move toward focusing almost exclusively on studio production work. Lynne produced and wrote the 1983 top-40 hit "Slipping Away" for Dave Edmunds and played on sessions (with Tandy) for Edmunds's album, Information. Lynne also produced six tracks on Edmunds's follow-up album in 1984, Riff Raff.

Lynne also wrote the songs "The Story of Me", which was recorded by the Everly Brothers on their comeback album EB84, and "One Way Love" from Agnetha Fältskog for her second post-ABBA album, Eyes of a Woman.

Lynne started working with George Harrison very closely in the late 1980s. This friendship eventually led to Harrison's appearance at the Birmingham Heartbeat Charity Concert, showing up as the finale of the concert and joining many other musicians in a rendition of "Johnny B. Goode", as well as a one-off Electric Light Orchestra concert, both in 1986. In 1987, he appeared with Harrison at The Prince's Trust event at Wembley Arena.

=== 1987–1991: Traveling Wilburys ===
Lynne's Beatles influence was evident in his ELO work, and the connection to the Beatles strengthened when Lynne produced George Harrison's Cloud Nine. Released in 1987, it was a successful comeback for Harrison, featuring the popular singles "Got My Mind Set on You", "When We Was Fab" (appearing in the video) and "This Is Love", the last two of which were co-written by Lynne. Lynne's association with Harrison led to the 1988 formation of the Traveling Wilburys, a studio "supergroup" including Tom Petty, Bob Dylan, and Roy Orbison that resulted in two albums (Vol. 1 and Vol. 3), both produced by Harrison and Lynne. In 1988, Lynne also worked on Orbison's album Mystery Girl, co-writing and producing Orbison's last major hit, "You Got It", plus two other tracks on that album.

In the late 1980s Lynne co-wrote and produced "Let It Shine" for Brian Wilson's first solo album. Lynne also contributed three tracks to an album by Duane Eddy and "Falling in Love" on Land of Dreams for Randy Newman.

In 1989, Lynne co-produced Full Moon Fever by Tom Petty, which included the hit singles "Free Fallin'", "I Won't Back Down" and "Runnin' Down a Dream", all co-written by Lynne. This album and Traveling Wilburys Vol. 1 received nominations for the Grammy Award for Best Album of the Year in 1989. The Traveling Wilburys won a Grammy for "Best Rock Performance By a Duo or Group with Vocal" that year.

In 1990, Lynne collaborated on the Wilburys' follow up Traveling Wilburys Vol. 3 and released his first solo album Armchair Theatre. The album featured Tandy and Harrison and included the singles "Every Little Thing" and "Lift Me Up". It received some positive critical attention but little commercial success. Lynne also provided the song "Wild Times" to the motion picture soundtrack Robin Hood: Prince of Thieves.

In 1991, Lynne returned to the studio with Petty, co-writing and producing the album Into the Great Wide Open for Tom Petty and the Heartbreakers, which featured the singles "Learning to Fly" and "Into the Great Wide Open". The following year he produced two songs on Roy Orbison's posthumous King of Hearts, including the single "I Drove All Night".

=== 1990s–2000s ===
For 1991's Rock On!, the final Del Shannon album, Lynne co-wrote "Walk Away" and finished off several tracks after Shannon's death.

In February 1994, Lynne worked with the three surviving Beatles on the Anthology album series. At Harrison's request, Lynne was brought in to assist in reevaluating John Lennon's original studio material. The songs "Free as a Bird" and "Real Love" were created by digitally processing Lennon's demos for the songs and overdubbing the three surviving band members to form a virtual Beatles reunion that the band had mutually eschewed during Lennon's lifetime. He also worked on the song "Now and Then", which remained unfinished until 2023. Lynne has also produced records for Ringo Starr and worked on Paul McCartney's Grammy-nominated album Flaming Pie.

Lynne's work in the 1990s also includes production of a 1993 album for singer-songwriter Julianna Raye titled Something Peculiar and production or songwriting contributions to albums by Roger McGuinn (Back from Rio) and Joe Cocker (Night Calls), plus songs by Aerosmith ("Lizard Love"), Tom Jones ("Lift Me Up"), Bonnie Tyler ("Time Mends a Broken Heart"), Hank Marvin ("Wonderful Land" and "Nivram") and Et Moi ("Drole De Vie"), as well as the film "Still Crazy". In 1996, Lynne was officially recognised by his peers when he was awarded the Ivor Novello Award for "Outstanding Contributions to British Music" for the second time.

In the year 2000, Lynne reactivated ELO and released the retrospective box set Flashback, containing many newly finished, previously unreleased tracks. The following year Lynne debuted the first new ELO album in fifteen years, Zoom. The album featured guest appearances by Ringo Starr, George Harrison and Richard Tandy, with Lynne multi-tracking a majority of the instruments and vocals. The album received positive reviews but had no hit singles. It was marketed as a "return to the classic ELO sound" in an attempt to connect with a loyal body of fans and to jump-start a planned concert tour (with Lynne and Tandy as the only returning original ELO members). While a live performance was taped at CBS Television City over two consecutive nights and shown on PBS (with subsequent DVD release), the tour itself was cancelled.

In 2001, Lynne started work with George Harrison on what would turn out to be Harrison's final album, Brainwashed. After Harrison's death from cancer on 29 November 2001, Lynne returned to the studio in 2002 to help finish the uncompleted album. Lynne was heavily involved in the memorial Concert for George, held at London's Royal Albert Hall in November 2002, which also featured Traveling Wilburys member Petty. Lynne sang the lead vocal on "The Inner Light", "I Want to Tell You", and "Give Me Love (Give Me Peace on Earth)", and subsequently produced the Surround Sound audio mix for the Concert for George DVD, released in November 2003, which later received a Grammy. Lynne reunited in 2006 with Petty to produce the latter's third solo release, Highway Companion. In 2004, Lynne and Petty inducted Harrison into the Rock and Roll Hall of Fame, and performed "Handle with Care" with Dhani Harrison, and "While My Guitar Gently Weeps" with Prince, Steve Winwood and others.

In a Reuters article on 23 April 2009, Lynne said that he had been working on the follow-up to his 1990 solo debut album Armchair Theatre with a possible tentative release date of "later this year". He also produced four tracks on Regina Spektor's fifth album Far, released on 23 June 2009.

=== 2010s ===
In a March 2010 interview with the Daily Express newspaper, Lynne confirmed he was working on a new album with Joe Walsh and simultaneously "writing a couple of albums under his own name, though he won't tell us in which musical direction he's heading." Lynne contributed a cover of Buddy Holly's "Words of Love" for the tribute album Listen to Me: Buddy Holly, which was released on 6 September 2011. On 31 December 2011, Brian Williams reported on NBC New Year's Eve with Carson Daly that "2012 releases will include rare new work from Jeff Lynne."

In 2012, Walsh released his Analog Man album which was produced by Lynne. Lynne's second solo album, a covers album titled Long Wave, was released on 8 October 2012. A greatest hits collection of re-recorded ELO songs by Lynne titled Mr. Blue Sky: The Very Best of Electric Light Orchestra was also released under the ELO moniker on the same day. Lynne suggested that a new album with original material could be released during 2013. In 2012, Lynne and Tandy teamed up at Lynne's Bungalow Palace home studios to record a live set of ELO's songs. This was broadcast on TV as part of the Mr. Blue Sky documentary. Lynne and Tandy reunited again on 12 November 2013 to perform, under the name Jeff Lynne and Friends, "Livin' Thing" and "Mr. Blue Sky" at the Children in Need Rocks concert at Hammersmith Eventim Apollo, London.

On 9 February 2014, Lynne performed George Harrison's "Something" with Joe Walsh and Dhani Harrison on The Night That Changed America: A Grammy Salute to The Beatles, as well as "Hey Bulldog" from the Yellow Submarine soundtrack, while accompanying Dave Grohl, commemorating the 50th anniversary of the Beatles' performance on The Ed Sullivan Show. On 5 March 2014, Lynne received an honorary doctorate degree from Birmingham City University. He also mentioned he was working with Bryan Adams on new material. On 14 September 2014, Jeff Lynne and his touring band, under the name Jeff Lynne's ELO, played a public concert for the first time in over 25 years, headlining at the Radio 2 festival in Hyde Park, London. Never particularly enthusiastic for live performance even in his younger days, Lynne has called this event "easily the best concert I've ever been involved with".

On 8 February 2015, Lynne appeared at the Grammy Awards, playing "Evil Woman" and "Mr. Blue Sky" with Ed Sheeran.

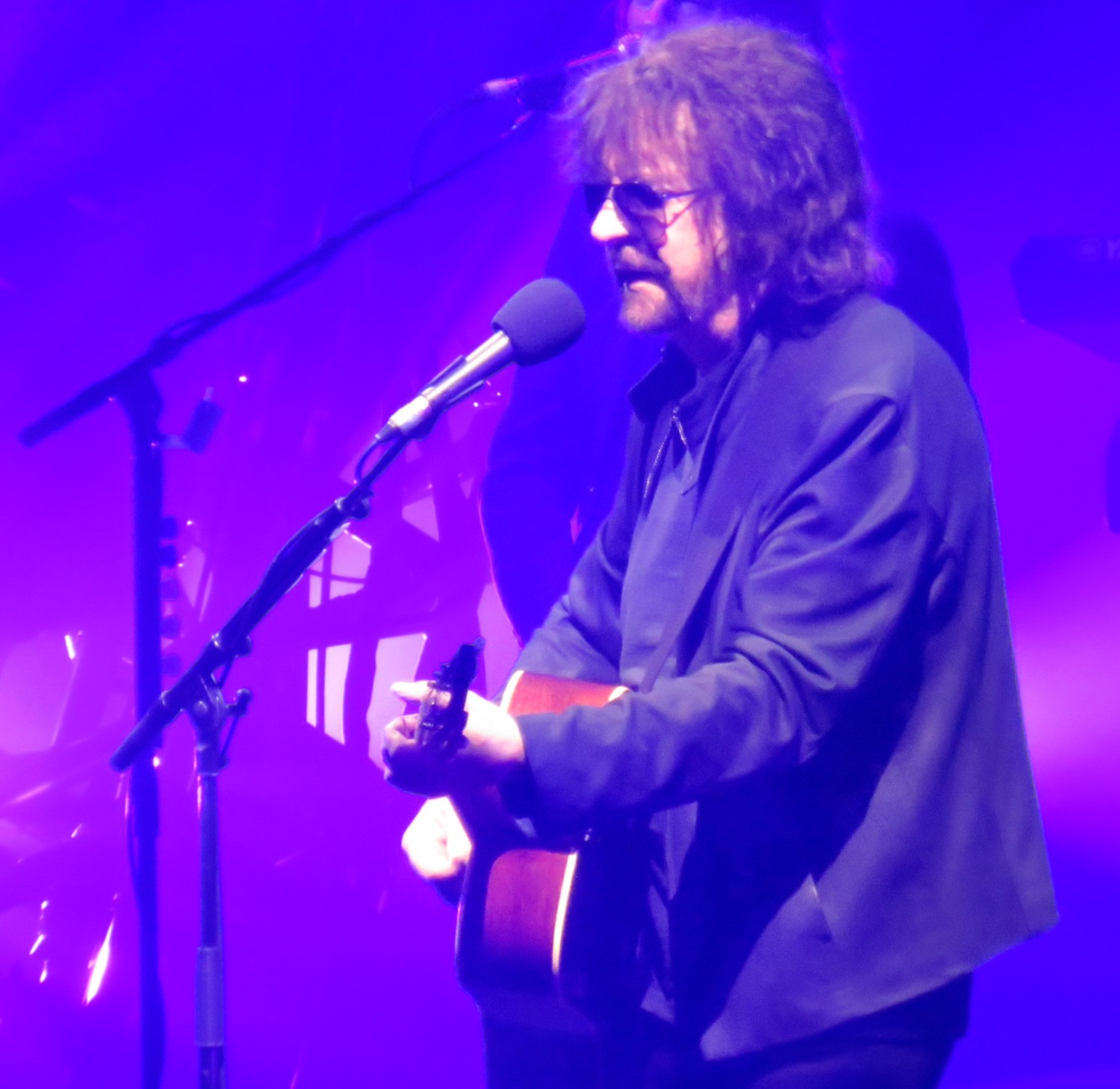
Lynne performing at the Genting Arena in April 2016

On 10 September 2015, Lynne's website announced he had signed a contract to deliver an album of new ELO music for Columbia Records marking the first time in 14 years new ELO music would be released. On 24 September 2015, "When I Was a Boy", the first single from Alone in the Universe was released on the internet with a music video scheduled not long after. The album was released on 13 November 2015 and was followed by promotional shows including the first ELO shows in the United States in 30 years. A 2016 European tour was scheduled, with Dublin, Amsterdam and Zürich being some of the locations toured. Notably, the Dublin concert was delayed by a week due to medical advice given to Lynne. In September, 2016, shortly after the European dates, ELO played three shows at the Hollywood Bowl, Los Angeles, with full orchestra and fireworks. Jeff Lynne's ELO also played two concerts at Radio City Music Hall in New York City, on 16 and 18 September 2016 respectively.

On 24 June 2017, Lynne performed at Wembley Stadium to a crowd of 60,000, playing a 24-song setlist including "Xanadu", "Do Ya" and "Twilight". The concert was released on DVD and CD, under the title Wembley or Bust. On 2 August 2018, Lynne and his band Jeff Lynne's ELO began a 10-city tour of North America which included Oakland, Los Angeles, Denver, Houston, Dallas, Rosemont, Illinois, Detroit, New York City, Philadelphia and Toronto. On 12 September 2018, Jeff Lynne's ELO began a tour throughout Europe including dates in Stockholm, Oslo, Copenhagen, Hamburg, Berlin, Munich, Mannheim, Vienna, Amsterdam, Nottingham, Glasgow, Manchester, Newcastle upon Tyne, Birmingham, Leeds, London, Liverpool, Dublin and Belfast. On 20 June 2019, Jeff Lynne's ELO began a North American tour with Dhani Harrison.

On 26 September 2019, Jeff Lynne's ELO announced a new album, called From Out of Nowhere, which was subsequently released on 1 November of the same year. The album was accompanied by the release of an eponymous single which premiered on BBC Radio 2 that same day. The album went to number one on the UK Albums Chart.

=== 2020s ===
On 18 March 2024, Jeff Lynne's ELO announced the Over And Out Tour, a final tour of North America that would span from August to October 2024. Tandy died on 1 May 2024, at the age of 76. Announcing his death on social media, Lynne memorialised Tandy as "a remarkable musician and friend". In December 2024, Lynne received an award from Spotify celebrating 1 billion streams of ELO's biggest hit, "Mr. Blue Sky".

== Personal life ==
Lynne was married to his first wife Rosemary Adams, from 1972 to 1977. In 1979 he married Sandi Kapelson, with whom he has two daughters. After divorcing Kapelson, Lynne married Camelia Kath in 2017.

Despite his success, Lynne has spoken of his aversion to the stereotypical rock star lifestyle. Reflecting on the 1970s, he told Rolling Stone magazine: "I was reluctant to become a real rock star. I was shy and was always told to not get a big head. And my favourite thing in the world was to work 14 hours a day in the studio. Everything else was peripheral to me, like having the record out and promoting it. I did have a big house, but I didn't do rock-star things. I never saw myself like that. I was a songwriter, singer and producer. Rock stars are different. They dress all flashy and hang out in nightclubs. That just wasn't my priority. I liked to spend my spare moments at the pub."

Lynne was appointed Officer of the Order of the British Empire (OBE) in the 2020 Birthday Honours for services to music. He is a fan of Birmingham City F.C.

In July 2025, during his Over and Out tour, Lynne suffered a hand injury while travelling in a taxi in London. The last two shows on the UK tour (which were to be the band's last ever) were cancelled due to Lynne's health, with no plans to reschedule.

== Awards and honours ==
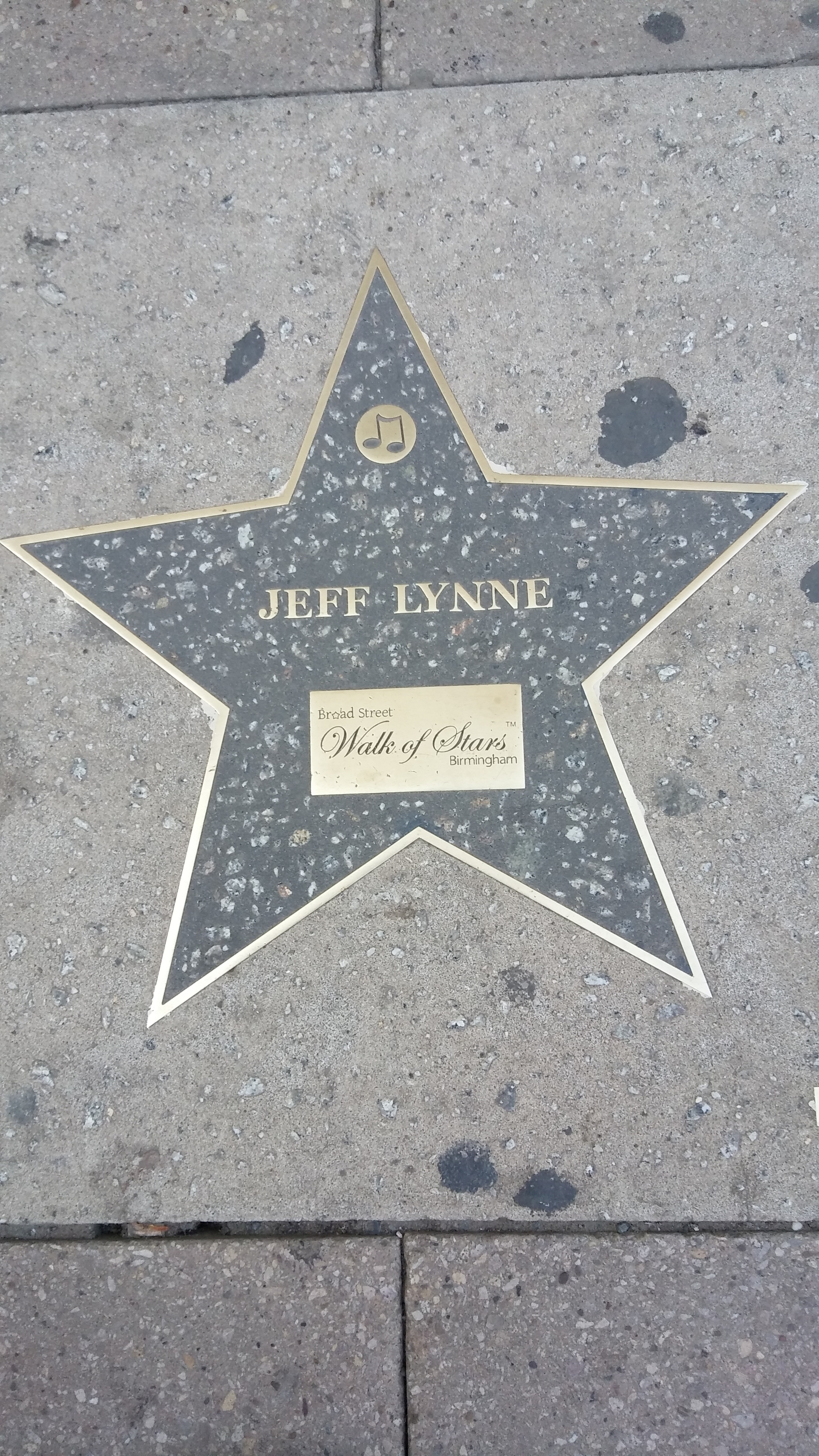
Lynne's star on the Walk of Stars in Birmingham

- 2009: Golden Note Award from the ASCAP
- 2013: Songwriters Hall of Fame nominee for 2014 induction
- 2014: Star on the Birmingham Walk of Stars
- 2014: Honorary doctorate degree from Birmingham City University
- 2015: Star on the Hollywood Walk of Fame
- 2015: Songwriters Hall of Fame nominee for 2016 induction
- 2016: Songwriters Hall of Fame nominee for 2017 induction
- 2017: Rock and Roll Hall of Fame inductee as a member of Electric Light Orchestra
- 2018: Songwriters Hall of Fame nominee for 2019 induction
- 2019: ASCAP Founders Award from the ASCAP
- 2023: Songwriters Hall of Fame induction

== Discography ==
=== Solo albums ===
Title	Album details	Peak chart positions									
Title	Album details	UK	AUS	BEL	CAN	GER	NLD	NOR	SWE	SWI	US
Armchair Theatre	Released: 12 June 1990; Label: Reprise	24	35	—	23	52	44	7	8	—	83
Long Wave	Released: 26 September 2012; Label: Frontiers	7	—	153	—	83	74	—	24	64	113

=== Singles ===
Year	Title	Album	Chart positions			
Year	Title	Album	UK	AUS	CAN	US
1977	"Doin' That Crazy Thing"	Non-album single	–	–	–	–
1984	"Video!"	Electric Dreams: Original Soundtrack from the Film	87	–	–	85
1990	"Every Little Thing"	Armchair Theatre	59	31	18	–
1990	"Lift Me Up"	Armchair Theatre	–	125	37	–

=== With ELO ===
Main articles: Electric Light Orchestra discography and recorded songs

Studio albums

- The Electric Light Orchestra (1971)
- ELO 2 (1973)
- On the Third Day (1973)
- Eldorado (1974)
- Face the Music (1975)
- A New World Record (1976)
- Out of the Blue (1977)
- Discovery (1979)
- Time (1981) (as ELO)
- Secret Messages (1983)
- Balance of Power (1986)
- Zoom (2001)
- Alone in the Universe (2015) (as Jeff Lynne's ELO)
- From Out of Nowhere (2019) (as Jeff Lynne's ELO)

=== Compilation appearances ===
Year	Song	Album
1976	"With a Little Help from My Friends"/"Nowhere Man"	All This and World War II: Original Soundtrack
1984	"Video!"	Electric Dreams: Original Soundtrack from the Film
1984	"Let it Run"	Electric Dreams: Original Soundtrack from the Film
1991	"Wild Times"	Robin Hood: Prince of Thieves - Original Motion Picture Soundtrack
2003	"The Inner Light" (with Anoushka Shankar)	Concert for George
2003	"I Want to Tell You"	Concert for George
2003	"Give Me Love (Give Me Peace on Earth)"	Concert for George
2003	"Handle with Care" (with Tom Petty & The Heartbreakers and Dhani Harrison)	Concert for George
2011	"Words of Love"	Listen to Me: Buddy Holly
2013	"Stream of Stars"	American Hustle: Original Motion Picture Soundtrack
2014	"Junk"	The Art of McCartney

=== As producer, composer or session musician ===
For releases by bands of which Lynne was a member, see The Idle Race discography, the Move discography, Electric Light Orchestra discography, Traveling Wilburys discography

Year	Artist	Release	Subject	Comment
1974	Del Shannon	"Ghost"	—	Co-producer
1975	Jasper Carrott	"Funky Moped"	"Funky Moped"	Producer
1983	Dave Edmunds	Information	"Slipping Away" "Information"	Producer, writer ("Slipping Away), bass, synthesizer
1984	Dave Edmunds	Riff Raff	—	Co-producer
1984	The Everly Brothers	EB 84	"The Story of Me"	Writer, bass, arrangements
1985	Agnetha Fältskog	Eyes of a Woman	"One Way Love"	Writer
1986	Tandy Morgan Band	"Action!"	—	Producer
1987	George Harrison	Cloud Nine	—	Co-producer, co-writer on "That's What It Takes", "This Is Love" and "When We Was Fab", bass, acoustic and electric guitars, keyboards, synthesizer, backing vocals
1987	Duane Eddy	Duane Eddy	"Theme For Something Really Important" "The Trembler" "Rockabilly Holiday"	Producer, writer ("Theme For Something Really Important", "Rockabilly Holiday"), keyboards, synthesizer, bass, guitar, drums
1988	George Harrison	"When We Was Fab"	"Zig Zag"	Co-producer, co-writer
1988	Brian Wilson	Brian Wilson	"Let it Shine"	Co-producer, co-writer, keyboards, bass, six-string bass, guitar
1988	Randy Newman	Land of Dreams	"Falling In Love"	Producer, arrangement, keyboards, guitar, bass, backing vocals
1989	Roy Orbison	Mystery Girl	"You Got It" "A Love So Beautiful" "California Blue"	Producer, co-writer, electric guitar, acoustic guitar, keyboards, piano, bass guitar, backing vocals
1989	Tom Petty	Full Moon Fever	—	Co-producer, co-writer ("Free Fallin'","I Won't Back Down", "A Face in the Crowd", "Runnin' Down a Dream", "Yer So Bad", "A Mind with a Heart of Its Own", "Zombie Zoo"), bass guitar, rhythm guitar, guitar synthesizer, piano, keyboards, backing vocals, handclaps,
1989	Tom Petty	"I Won't Back Down"	"Don't Treat Me Like a Stranger"	Co-producer
1989	Tom Petty	"Runnin' Down a Dream"	"Down the Line"	Co-producer
1989	George Harrison	Lethal Weapon 2	"Cheer Down"	Co-producer, bass, guitar, keyboards, backing vocals
1990	Miss B. Haven	Nobody's Angel	—	Co-producer
1991	Tom Petty and the Heartbreakers	Into the Great Wide Open	—	Co-producer
1991	Del Shannon	Rock On!	—	Co-producer, co-writer ("Walk Away"), guitar, keyboards, bass guitar, backing vocals
1992	Ringo Starr	Time Takes Time	"Don't Go Where the Road Don't Go" "After All These Years"	Producer, guitar, bass, piano, keyboards, backing vocals
1992	Ringo Starr	"Weight of the World"	"Don't Be Cruel"	Producer
1992	George Harrison	Songs by George Harrison 2	"Hottest Gong in Town"	Co-producer
1992	Roy Orbison	King of Hearts	"Heartbreak Radio" "I Drove All Night"	Producer
1992	Tom Petty and the Heartbreakers	A Very Special Christmas 2	"Christmas All Over Again"	Co-producer
1993	Julianna Raye	Something Peculiar	—	Producer
1995	The Beatles	Anthology 1	"Free as a Bird"	Co-producer
1996	The Beatles	Anthology 2	"Real Love"	Co-producer
1997	Paul McCartney	Flaming Pie	"The Song We Were Singing" "The World Tonight" "Flaming Pie" "Heaven on a Sunday" "Souvenir" "Little Willow" "Really Love You" "Beautiful Night"	Co-producer, harmony vocal, electric guitar, acoustic guitar, keyboard, backing vocals, spinette, harpsichord
1997	Paul McCartney	"Young Boy"	"Looking for You"	Co-producer
1998	Del Shannon	A Complete Career Anthology: 1961-1990	one previously unreleased song produced by Lynne	Co-producer
1998	Various Artists	Still Crazy	"Dirty Town" "A Woman Like That"	Co-writer
1999	Jimmy Nail	Tadpoles In A Jar	"Blue Beyond The Grey" "	Producer, Electric Guitar, Acoustic Guitar, Bass Guitar, Keyboards, Drums
2000	Paul McCartney	Maybe Baby	"Maybe Baby"	Co-producer
2002	George Harrison	Brainwashed	—	Co-producer, bass guitar, electric guitar, acoustic guitar, piano, electric piano, keyboards, percussion, backing vocals
2003	Various artists	Concert for George	—	Producer
2006	Tom Petty	Highway Companion	—	Co-producer
2009	Regina Spektor	Far	"Blue Lips" "Folding Chair" "Genius Next Door" "Wallet" "The Sword & the Pen"	Producer
2012	Joe Walsh	Analog Man	"Analog Man" "Wrecking Ball" "Spanish Dancer" "Hi-Roller Baby" "Fishbone"	Producer, mixing, keyboards, guitars, bass, drums, backing vocals
2015	Bryan Adams	Get Up!	—	Producer
2023	The Beatles	1967–1970 (2023 edition)	"Now and Then"	Additional production

=== Music videos ===
Year	Title	Album
1984	"Video!"	Electric Dreams soundtrack
1984	"Let It Run"	Electric Dreams soundtrack
1989	"I Won't Back Down" (Tom Petty)	Full Moon Fever
1990	"Every Little Thing"	Armchair Theatre
1990	"Lift Me Up"	Armchair Theatre

== Bibliography ==
- Van der Kiste, John. Jeff Lynne: The Electric Light Orchestra, before and after (Stroud: Fonthill Media, 2015)
