= Information (Dave Edmunds album) =

Studio album by Dave Edmunds
- Released: April 1983
- Recorded: 1983
- Studio: Maison Rouge, Eden and Wisseloord, the Netherlands
- Genre: Rock
- Length: 34:49
- Label: Arista (UK); Columbia (US)
- Producer: Dave Edmunds, Jeff Lynne

Dave Edmunds chronology
D.E. 7th (1982)	Information (1983)	Riff Raff (1984)

Alternative cover
- US/Canada cover

Professional ratings
Review scores
Source	Rating
AllMusic	2/5 stars
Christgau's Record Guide	B−
Rolling Stone	4/5 stars

Information is a 1983 album by Welsh rock musician Dave Edmunds. The album was his second release for Arista Records (in the UK) and Columbia Records (in the US).

Information marked the first time in Edmunds' solo career that he collaborated with an outside producer. Electric Light Orchestra frontman Jeff Lynne produced two songs on the album: the title track, and the Lynne-penned "Slipping Away". The latter would become Edmunds' first American top-40 hit in 13 years (and his last top-40 hit to date), reaching No. 39 on the Billboard Hot 100. The album itself reached No. 51 on the Billboard 200 and No. 92 in the UK.

Other cover versions on the album include NRBQ's "I Want You Bad" and the J. Geils Band's "Wait".

== Track listing ==
1. "Slipping Away" (Jeff Lynne)
2. "Don't You Double" (Moon Martin)
3. "I Want You Bad" (Terry Adams, Phil Crandon)
4. "Wait" (Seth Justman, Peter Wolf)
5. "The Watch on My Wrist" (Paul Kennerley)
6. "The Shape I'm In" (Lee Cathy, Otis Blackwell)
7. "Information" (Dave Edmunds, Mark Radice)
8. "Feel So Right" (Paul Kennerley)
9. "What Have I Got to Do to Win?" (John David, Edmunds)
10. "Don't Call Me Tonight" (Dave Edmunds)
11. "Have a Heart" (John David)

== Personnel ==
- Dave Edmunds - guitar, vocals
- Geraint Watkins - accordion
- John David - bass
- Jeff Lynne - bass, synthesizer
- Dave Charles - drums
- Paul Jones - harmonica
- Richard Tandy - synthesizer

== Charts ==
Chart (1983)	Peak position
Swedish Albums (Sverigetopplistan)	20
UK Albums (OCC)	92
US Billboard 200	51
