= Love Sculpture =

Welsh blues rock band

- Origin: Cardiff, Wales
- Genre: Blues rock
- Years active: 1966–1970
- Labels: Parlophone; Rare Earth
- Past members: Dave Edmunds; John David; Rob 'Congo' Jones; Mickey Gee; Terry Williams

Love Sculpture were a Welsh blues rock band that was active from 1966 to 1970, led by Dave Edmunds (born 15 April 1944 in Cardiff, Wales), with bassist John David (born 19 January 1946 in Cardiff) and drummer Rob "Congo" Jones (born 13 August 1946 in Barry, Wales).

== Career ==
Love Sculpture were founded in Cardiff in 1966 by former members of the Human Beans. The band mostly performed blues standards, slightly revved-up, but still close to the originals. Their debut album Blues Helping included the songs "Summertime" and "Wang Dang Doodle".

They are best known for their 1968 novelty hit in the UK Singles Chart, a high-speed cover version of the classical piece "Sabre Dance" by Aram Khachaturian, released on the Parlophone label (R 5744), which reached No. 5 in the UK Singles Chart in December 1968. The recording was inspired by Keith Emerson's classical rearrangements. "Sabre Dance" became a hit after receiving air play by British DJ John Peel, who was so impressed that he played it twice in one programme. In December 1968, UK music magazine NME reported that Love Sculpture had signed a US recording contract with London Records, guaranteeing £250,000. The band was also given an invitation to perform "Sabre Dance" live on the German Beat-Club television programme of Radio Bremen, which was broadcast in monochrome at that time.

Second album Forms and Feelings followed, including the aforementioned "Sabre Dance", and additional songs including "In The Land of the Few", "Farandole", "People People", "Seagull (West Coast Oil Tragedy)" written by Paul Korda, and the equally fast cover of Chuck Berry's "You Can't Catch Me". The US version of the album also featured a recording of "Mars" from Gustav Holst's The Planets, but Holst's estate refused to license the tune for the UK version.

They recorded for BBC Radio 1's John Peel sessions in 1968 (twice) and 1969.

In 1970 Mickey Gee joined the band as a second guitarist, and Terry Williams replaced Rob Jones on drums.

Love Sculpture split up in 1970 after a US tour, having recorded just the two albums. Edmunds went on to solo number one hit success with "I Hear You Knocking" later in 1970, and he collaborated heavily with ex-Brinsley Schwarz bassist Nick Lowe, eventually forming the band Rockpile with Lowe and Terry Williams.

Guitarist Mickey Gee died from emphysema in Cardiff, on 21 January 2009, aged 64. Drummer Rob "Congo" Jones died on 24 June 2026, aged 79.

== Band members ==
- Dave Edmunds – lead vocals, guitar (1966–70)
- John David – bass, backing vocals (1966–70)
- Rob "Congo" Jones – drums, percussion (1966–1970; died 2026)
- Mickey Gee – guitar (1970; died 2009)
- Terry Williams – drums, percussion (1970)

== Discography ==
=== Albums ===
==== Blues Helping – (October 1968) – Parlophone ====
Released in the US in mid-May on Motown's new Rare Earth label (RS-505), with a different cover design.

1. "The Stumble" (Freddy King, Sonny Thompson) (shown as "Stumble" on cover, "The Stumble" on label)
2. "3 O'Clock Blues" (B. B. King, Jules Taub)
3. "I Believe to My Soul" (Ray Charles)
4. "So Unkind" (Elmore James, Marshall Sehorn)
5. "Summertime" (George Gershwin, DuBose Heyward)
6. "On The Road Again" (Floyd Jones, Alan Wilson)
7. "Don't Answer the Door" (James Franklin Johnson)
8. "Wang-Dang-Doodle" (Willie Dixon)
9. "Come Back Baby" (Ray Charles)
10. "Shake Your Hips" (Slim Harpo)
11. "Blues Helping" (John David Williams, Dave Edmunds, Rob Jones)

==== 2007 Esoteric Records reissue bonus tracks ====
1. "Morning Dew" (Human Beans)
2. "It's a Wonder" (Human Beans)
3. "River to Another Day" (Single)
4. "Brand New Woman" (Single)
- Dave Edmunds – guitars, lead vocals, organ, piano
- John Williams – bass, backing vocals (3, 5, 6, 8), piano (10)
- Bob "Congo" Jones – drums, backing vocals (3, 5)

==== Forms and Feelings – (December 1969) – Parlophone ====
Released in the US in 1970 on Parrot (PAS-71035).

1. "In the Land of the Few" (Mike Finesilver, Pete Ker, Dave Edmunds) – 3:55
2. "Seagull" (Paul Korda) – 3:28
3. "Nobody's Talking" (Finesilver, Ker) – 3:37
4. "Why (How Now)" (Finesilver, Ker) – 7:42
5. "Farandole" (Georges Bizet, arranged by Dave Edmunds) – 3:42
6. "You Can't Catch Me" (Chuck Berry) – 3:25
7. "People People" (Finesilver, Ker) – 3:23
8. "Mars" (Gustav Holst) – 1:58 (US version only)
9. "Sabre Dance" (Aram Khachaturian, arranged by Dave Edmunds) – 11:12

==== 2007 Esoteric Records release bonus tracks ====
1. "Think of Love"
2. "Seagull" (Mono Single Version)
3. "Farandole (Mono Single Version)
4. "In the Land of the Few" (Mono Single Version)
5. "People People" (Mono Single Version)
6. "Sabre Dance" (Single Version)
- Dave Edmunds – guitars, lead vocals, keyboards
- John Williams – bass, backing vocals, keyboards
- Bob "Congo" Jones – drums, backing vocals

Both albums were reissued in May 2008, remastered and with bonus tracks (including the tracks from the two singles listed below).

=== Singles ===
- "River to Another Day" – (1968) – B-side – "Brand New Woman"
- "Sabre Dance" – (1968) – B-side – "Think of Love" – UK No. 5

== See also ==
- List of blues rock musicians
- List of Peel sessions
- List of performers on Top of the Pops
