= Rockpile =

British rock and roll band

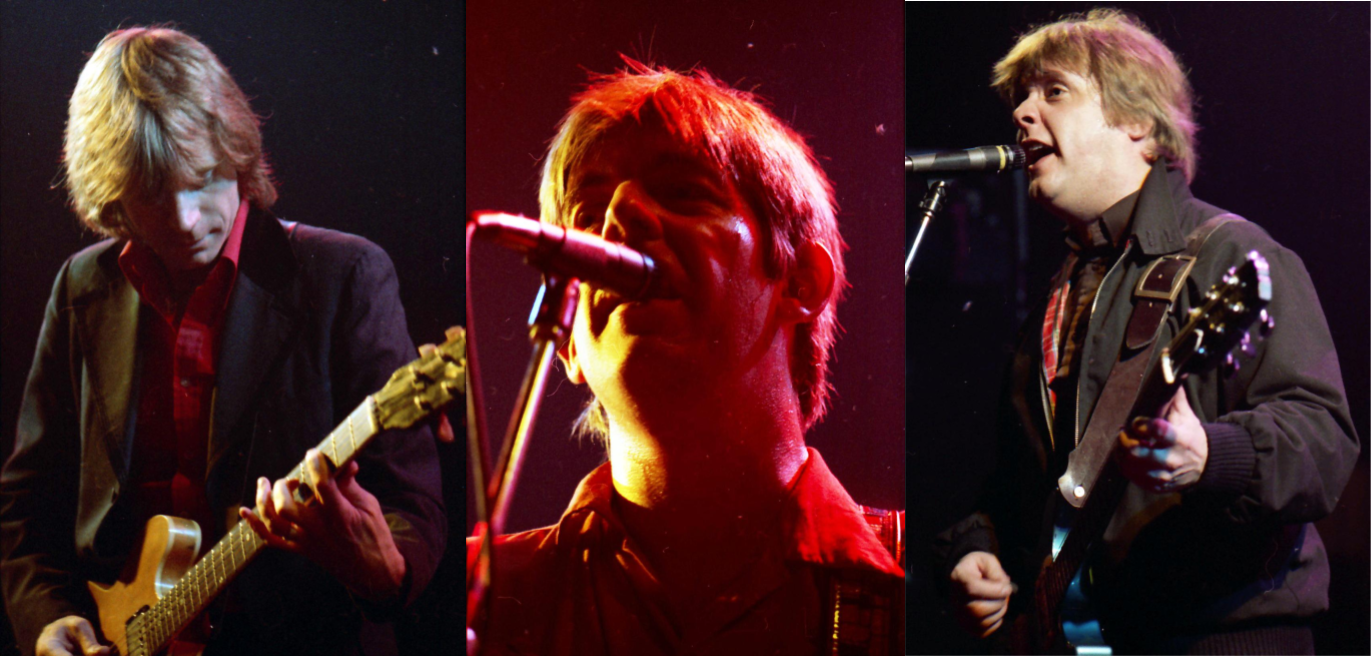
- Dave Edmunds, Nick Lowe and Billy Bremner performing in Toronto in 1980.

Background information
- Origin: England
- Genres: Rock and roll, pub rock, rockabilly, power pop, new wave
- Years active: 1976–1981
- Labels: F-Beat (UK), Columbia (US), Swan Song
- Past members: Billy Bremner; Dave Edmunds; Nick Lowe; Terry Williams

Rockpile were a British rock band of the late 1970s and early 1980s. Noted for their strong pub rock, rockabilly and power pop influences, they were a foundational influence on new wave. The band consisted of Dave Edmunds (vocals, guitar), Nick Lowe (vocals, bass guitar), Billy Bremner (vocals, guitar) and Terry Williams (drums).

Rockpile recorded almost enough material for five studio albums, though only one (Seconds of Pleasure) was released under the Rockpile banner. Three other albums (Tracks on Wax 4, Repeat When Necessary, and Twangin...) were released as Dave Edmunds solo albums, and one more (Labour of Lust) was released as a Nick Lowe solo album. Scattered Rockpile tracks can also be found on a few other Lowe and Edmunds solo albums. Additionally, Rockpile served as backing group on tracks recorded by Mickey Jupp in 1978 and Carlene Carter in 1980.

== History ==
Guitarist/vocalist Edmunds had recorded a 1972 solo album titled Rockpile, and on his tour in support of the album, he billed his band, which included Terry Williams on drums, as Dave Edmunds and Rockpile. However, the band broke up after the tour, and Edmunds returned to studio work. One of the artists that he produced was the pub rock band Brinsley Schwarz, managed by Dave Robinson and led by bassist/singer Nick Lowe. Their 1974 album, The New Favourites of... Brinsley Schwarz, produced by Edmunds, pushed the band into a power pop mode and included the original version of "(What's So Funny 'Bout) Peace, Love, and Understanding". Brinsley Schwarz broke up after the release of the album, and Lowe began doing session work with Edmunds, including Edmunds' 1975 solo album Subtle as a Flying Mallet.

When Dave Robinson and Jake Riviera co-founded Stiff Records, Lowe was the first artist signed to the label, and he and Edmunds recorded new material for release under Lowe's name. Stiff promoted its ties to Edmunds. However, the relationship between Edmunds and Riviera was always rocky, and in 1976 Edmunds signed a solo contract with Led Zeppelin's Swan Song Records, rejecting Riviera and Stiff. With help from Lowe and Terry Williams, Edmunds recorded a new solo album, Get It. Lowe and Edmunds then formed a new version of Rockpile, with Williams returning on drums and Billy Bremner joining as a second guitarist and third vocalist.

Despite the pressures from having its two leaders signed to different labels, Rockpile toured in 1976-77 as the opening act for Edmunds' new labelmates Bad Company, and Edmunds also provided some archive tracks to Stiff for release on Stiff compilations. However, as Lowe and Stiff became increasingly popular, Rockpile went into an on-again, off-again status. In 1977, Lowe became part of the "Five Live Stiffs" tour without Rockpile. Only Terry Williams was intended to be included in Lowe's backing band, which was called 'Nick Lowe's Last Chicken in the Shop'. At the last minute, however, Edmunds also joined the band, and, although Bremner did not participate in this tour, Rockpile was soon back in business full-time.

Rockpile appeared as a backing band on one track of Lowe's debut solo album, released in March 1978 with different track listings and titles in the UK and the US. The UK version (Jesus of Cool) featured Rockpile on the live recording of "Heart of the City", while the US album (Pure Pop for Now People) featured the Rockpile studio track "They Called It Rock", credited as being written by Nick Lowe/Dave Edmunds/Rockpile.

Meanwhile, Edmunds' 1978 solo album (Tracks on Wax 4) was the first album to be completely a Rockpile album; Edmunds sings all lead vocals. The album included the same live version of "Heart of the City," except with Edmunds' lead vocal overdubbed in place of Lowe's. Rockpile toured behind both the Lowe and Edmunds releases in 1978. The band also backed Mickey Jupp on side one of his Stiff album Juppanese, produced by Lowe.

In 1979, Rockpile simultaneously recorded Edmunds' Repeat When Necessary and Lowe's Labour of Lust. The recording process was the subject of the Granada Television documentary Born Fighters. Jake Riviera left Stiff Records and, taking his artists (Lowe, Elvis Costello, and the Yachts), moved to Radar Records in the UK (although Riviera Global Productions stayed with Columbia Records in the US). Edmunds' contract with Swan Song was unaffected by this change.

Rockpile (under solo artists' names) enjoyed hits in 1979 on both sides of the Atlantic with Edmunds' cover of Elvis Costello's "Girls Talk" (a top 20 hit in both the UK and Canada) and Lowe's "Cruel to Be Kind" (top 20 in the UK, Canada and the US). Labour of Lust was awarded a gold album in Canada and Repeat When Necessary was awarded a silver album in the United Kingdom. On 29 December 1979 the band shared a bill that included Elvis Costello & the Attractions and Wings for the Concerts for the People of Kampuchea, where they were joined onstage by Led Zeppelin lead singer Robert Plant (co-owner of Swan Song). Two of the songs from this performance were included in the concert album. Robert Plant also joined when Rockpile played a UK university tour (at least Warwick University) at about this time.

=== Seconds of Pleasure ===
In 1980, Edmunds submitted the solo album Twangin..., which was mostly a collection of outtakes from his previous solo albums, to complete his Swan Song contract, freeing Rockpile to record a true band record for Jake Riviera's new label F-Beat Records. Released in autumn 1980, Seconds of Pleasure featured lead vocal turns by Edmunds, Lowe and Bremner, and spawned the minor hit "Teacher, Teacher", sung by Lowe. Twangin... was issued six months after Seconds of Pleasure, and featured Rockpile on nine of its eleven tracks.

Rockpile also backed Lowe's new wife Carlene Carter (Johnny Cash's stepdaughter) on most of her 1980 album Musical Shapes. In August Rockpile played the noted Heatwave festival near Toronto, which with 100,000 attendees was the first large punk or new wave music event, and where Rockpile were the most experienced of the several major bands. But tensions between Lowe and Edmunds led to the band's dissolution in 1981. As Lowe put it, "We got together for fun and when the fun had all been had we packed it in." Edmunds said the breakup was caused mainly by his displeasure with Jake Riviera and the way in which Riviera had negotiated the contract for Seconds of Pleasure.

Bremner and Williams appeared on several Lowe albums throughout the 1980s, but Lowe and Edmunds did not work together again until Lowe's 1988 album Pinker and Prouder Than Previous. Edmunds also produced Lowe's 1990 album Party of One. In 2011, "Teacher, Teacher" appeared in the opening credits of the film Bad Teacher.

Since 2011, there have been a total of five different live Rockpile album releases, the most recent being in 2021. Live at Rockpalast from 2013 also includes a DVD of their 1980 live show. The listings for each of their live releases are in the discography section below.

== Members ==
- Billy Bremner – guitar, vocals (1976–1981)
- Dave Edmunds – vocals, guitar, keyboards (1976–1981)
- Nick Lowe – bass guitar, vocals (1976–1981)
- Terry Williams – drums (1976–1981)

== Discography ==
=== Studio albums ===
Year	Album details	Peak positions			
Year	Album details	UK	CAN	US	SWE
1980	Seconds of Pleasure: Release date: October 1980; Label: Columbia Records	34	29	27	8

=== Live albums ===
- Live at Montreux, 1980: released in 2011 by Eagle Records
- Live at Rockpalast, 1980: released in 2013 by Repertoire Records
- Live at The Palladium, 1979: released in 2017 by Vogon
- Live in New York, 1978: released in 2020 by Laser Media
- The Boston Show, 1979: released in 2021 by Laser Media

=== Singles ===
Year	Single	Peak positions			Album
Year	Single	AUS	CAN	US	Album
1980	"Wrong Again (Let's Face It)"	—	—	—	Seconds of Pleasure
1980	"Teacher, Teacher"	83	31	51	Seconds of Pleasure
1980	"Now and Always"	—	—	—	Seconds of Pleasure
"—" denotes releases that did not chart
