= I Hear You Knocking =

Song first recorded by Smiley Lewis

Single by Smiley Lewis
- B-side: "Bumpity Bump"
- Released: July 1955
- Recorded: 1955
- Studio: J&M, New Orleans, Louisiana
- Genre: New Orleans R&B
- Length: 2:23
- Label: Imperial
- Songwriter: Dave Bartholomew
- Producer: Dave Bartholomew

Smiley Lewis singles chronology
"Bells Are Ringing" (1952)	"I Hear You Knocking" (1955)	"One Night" (1956)

Official audio
- "I Hear You Knocking" on YouTube

"I Hear You Knocking" (or "I Hear You Knockin'") is a rhythm and blues song written by American musician Dave Bartholomew. New Orleans rhythm and blues singer Smiley Lewis first recorded the song in 1955. The lyrics tell of the return of a former lover who is rebuffed.

"I Hear You Knocking" reached number two on the Billboard R&B singles chart in 1955, making it Lewis's most popular and best-known song. Subsequently, numerous artists have recorded it, including Welsh singer and guitarist Dave Edmunds, whose version reached number one in the UK Singles Chart for six weeks in 1970 and was in the top 10 in several other countries.

== Background ==
Several earlier blues and R&B songs use lyrics similar to "I Hear You Knocking". James "Boodle It" Wiggins recorded an upbeat piano blues in 1928 titled "Keep A Knockin' An You Can't Get In" which repeated the title in the lyrics. It was followed by songs that used similar phrases, including "You Can't Come In", by Bert M. Mays (1928); "Keep On Knocking", by Lil Johnson (1935); "Keep a Knocking", by Milton Brown & His Brownies (1936); and "Keep Knocking (But You Can't Come In)", by Bob Wills and His Texas Playboys (1938). None of these early singles listed a songwriter or composer.

However, when popular jump blues bandleader Louis Jordan and his Tympany Five recorded the song as "Keep A-Knockin'" in 1939, the single's credits listed "Mays-Bradford" (Bert Mays and Perry Bradford). In 1957, Little Richard recorded it with the songwriter listed as "R. Penniman", Richard's legal name, although Bert Mays and J. Mayo Williams were later credited as songwriters.

Beginning with his signing by the Los Angeles–based Imperial Records in 1950, Smiley Lewis was one of the main proponents of the emerging New Orleans rhythm and blues style, along with Fats Domino, Lloyd Price, Dave Bartholomew, and Professor Longhair.

== Original song ==
Smiley Lewis recorded "I Hear You Knocking" with Dave Bartholomew's band at J&M Studios in New Orleans, owned by Cosimo Matassa. Bartholomew is listed as the producer and songwriter, along with Pearl King (a Bartholomew pseudonym; the maiden name of his wife). He claims that he wrote it "in the backseat of a car coming out of San Francisco". "I Hear You Knocking" uses a modified twelve-bar blues arrangement, in which the progression to the IV chord is repeated:

I	I	I	I^{7}	IV	IV	I	I^{7}	IV	IV	V	V

It has been notated in 4/4 time in the key of C with a moderate tempo. Instrumentally, the song is dominated by piano triplets in the style of Fats Domino, played by Huey "Piano" Smith. The lyrics echo some of the lines from the earlier songs:

You went away and left me long time ago
Now you're comin' back knockin' on my door
I hear you knockin', but you can't come in
I hear you knockin', go back where you been

"I Hear You Knocking" was released as a single by Imperial Records in 1955. It entered Billboard's R&B charts on September 3, where it spent eighteen weeks and reached number two.

== First cover versions ==
Also in 1955, actress and pop singer Gale Storm recorded "I Hear You Knockin'" for Dot Records. Her cover version reached number two on the Billboard Top 100 singles chart, number three on the Cash Box Best-Selling Record chart and became a gold record. Bartholomew believed her version "killed his [Lewis's] record"; blues researcher Bill Dahl added, "Storm swiped his [Lewis's] thunder for any crossover possibilities with her ludicrous whitewashed cover of the plaintive ballad." The experience reportedly led Bartholomew to refer to Lewis as a "'bad luck singer', because he never sold more than 100,000 copies of his Imperial singles". English singer Jill Day also recorded the song in 1956, as did Connie Francis in 1959. In 1961, Bartholomew produced Fats Domino's remake of the song.

== Dave Edmunds version ==
"I Hear You Knocking"

Single by Dave Edmunds
- B-side: "Black Bill"
- Released: November 1970
- Recorded: 1970
- Studio: Rockfield, Monmouthshire, Wales
- Genre: Blues rock; roots rock
- Length: 2:48
- Label: MAM
- Songwriter: Dave Bartholomew
- Producer: Dave Edmunds

Dave Edmunds singles chronology
"I Hear You Knocking" (1970)	"I'm Comin' Home" (1971)

Official Audio
- "I Hear You Knocking" on YouTube

Welsh singer and guitarist Dave Edmunds recorded "I Hear You Knocking" in 1970 after originally planning to record "Let's Work Together" by Wilbert Harrison, but finding it had been recorded by Canned Heat. He recalled:

Then an album of Smiley Lewis was released on United Artists in Britain, and they played "I Hear You Knocking" on the radio in Britain while I was driving along. I thought, "hang on", the two songs have identical format. You could use the same backing track for both songs. It's just a simple 12-bar thing. So I thought, I'll do that.

=== Recording ===
Edmunds recorded the song at Rockfield Studios, near Monmouth in Monmouthshire. Whereas Lewis's original recording is a piano-driven R&B piece with a 12/8 shuffle feel, Edmunds' version features prominent guitar lines and a stripped-down, straight-quaver rock-and-roll approach. He plays all the instruments (except possibly bass guitar) and AllMusic writer Stephen Thomas Erlewine suggests that the song "has a mechanical rhythm and a weird, out-of-phase vocal that qualifies as an original interpretation". Edmunds uses fills and a solo played on slide guitar, and during the instrumental break he shouts out the names of several recording artists: "Fats Domino, Smiley Lewis, Chuck Berry, Huey Smith"

=== Release and charts ===
The recording was the first single to be released on MAM Records. In November 1970, "I Hear You Knocking" reached number one in the UK, where it remained for six weeks, and became a Christmas number one. In his Lennon Remembers interview for Rolling Stone, John Lennon commented, "Well, I always liked simple rock. There's a great one in England now, 'I Hear You Knocking'." Lennon mentioned the song in the final interview he gave on December 8, 1980, calling it "One of the great records of all time." It eventually sold over three million copies, and was awarded a gold disc. The single also placed in the top 10 in several other countries, including number four on the U.S. Billboard Hot 100 in 1971. In 1972, the song was included on Edmunds' first solo album Rockpile.

Edmunds performed the song, with Jools Holland's Rhythm and Blues Orchestra, on the 2008 Jools' Annual Hootenanny.

1970–1971 singles charts
Chart	Peak
Australia (Go-Set)	5
Canada (RPM)	3
Germany	3
Ireland (IRMA)	1
New Zealand (Listener)	3
UK Singles Chart	1
U.S. (Billboard Hot 100)	4
U.S. (Cash Box Top 100)	4

1971 year end charts
Chart	Peak
Australia Go-Set	24
Germany	20

== See also ==
- List of number-one singles from the 1970s (UK)
- List of number-one singles of 1970 (Ireland)
