= John David (musician) =

Welsh bassist and songwriter (born 1946)

- Born: John David Williams; 19 January 1946 (age 80); Cardiff, Wales
- Genres: Rock and roll, rockabilly
- Instrument: Bass guitar
- Years active: 1966–present

John David Williams (born 19 January 1946 in Cardiff, Wales) is a Welsh bassist and songwriter who has worked with Dave Edmunds.

== Biography ==
He began his musical career playing drums in his father's dance band Avalon. By 1968 he was playing bass guitar and sang backing vocals in Edmunds' first major group, Love Sculpture, and their 1968 top ten hit single "Sabre Dance". At that time he used the name John Williams.

After Love Sculpture split in 1970 he concentrated on studio and session work, songwriting and engineering, as well as collaborating with Edmunds on his number one single "I Hear You Knocking", playing bass, piano, and percussion. In 1975, David played bass guitar and sang backing vocals on Andy Fairweather Low's album, La Booga Rooga.

In the mid-1970s, David formed a group, Airwaves, along with singer and guitarist Ray Martinez and drummer Dave Charles. In 1978, the group recorded and released an album New Day and a single of the same name (also known as "You Are the New Day"). A choral version was later recorded by the King's Singers. The song "So Hard Living Without You" peaked at number 62 on the Billboard Hot 100 that same year.

Throughout the years he had maintained his involvement with Edmunds, and after Edmunds' group Rockpile disbanded in 1980, David returned to working with him, writing and co-writing several songs on Edmunds' solo albums, including Information (1983), Riff Raff (1984), and Closer to the Flame (1990), as well as contributing backing vocals, bass and other instruments, and playing live on all the tours during the 1980s.

In 1983 he signed another solo recording deal and released a solo single, "On The Mountain", which was a minor hit in Germany.

At the same time he wrote for other artists. His first Top 10 success was "She Means Nothing to Me", a UK No. 9 hit for Phil Everly and Cliff Richard in 1983, on which he played lead guitar. Further success came with "I Won't Run Away", recorded by Alvin Stardust and a No. 7 hit in 1984, followed by "Hold Me Tight", No. 26 UK hit for Samantha Fox which David both wrote and co-produced. From 1986 to 2003, David wrote "Rollin' Home", "Red Sky", "I Didn't Mean It", "The Party Ain't Over Yet", and "All That Counts Is Love", all hit singles for Status Quo.

He built his own recording studio, Berry Hill, in the Forest of Dean, mainly to record his own song demos.

In 1991, he produced the Shakin' Stevens Christmas album on which he had written or co-written a number of songs.
