= Nick Lowe discography =

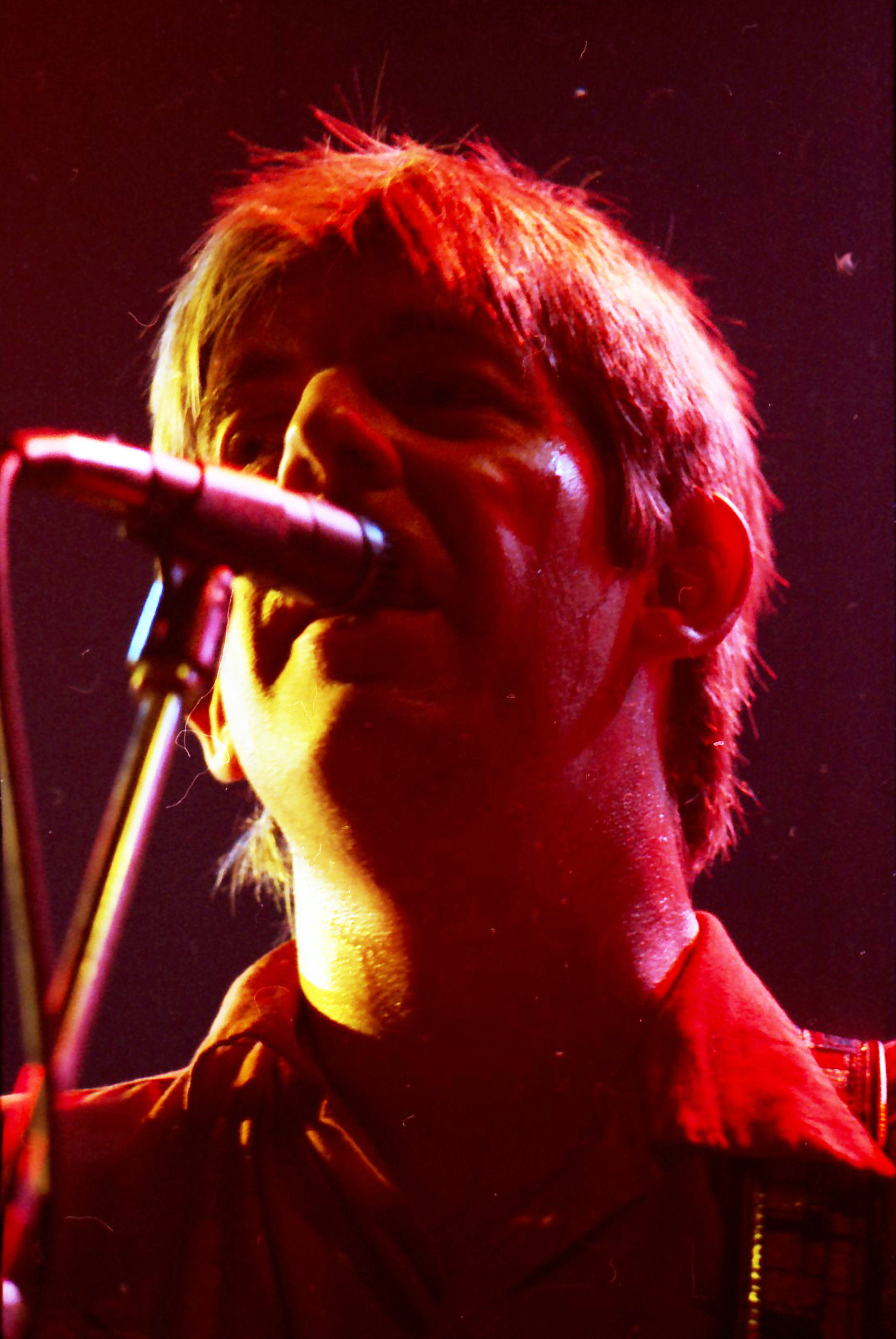
- Lowe performing with Rockpile in 1980
- Studio albums: 14
- EPs: 3
- Live albums: 3
- Compilation albums: 6
- Tribute albums: 7
- Singles: 23

Nick Lowe is an English singer-songwriter, musician, and producer. His discography consists of 14 studio albums, 1 live album, 3 EPs, 23 singles, and 6 compilations. In addition, he has been a performer and producer on numerous albums by other artists.

== Albums ==
=== Studio ===
Year	Album	Peak chart positions					Record label
Year	Album	UK	US	AUS	SWE	NL	Record label
1978	Jesus of Cool	22	127	77	31	26	Radar Records
1979	Labour of Lust	42	31	53	20	—	Radar Records
1982	Nick the Knife	99	50	—	18	—	Columbia Records
1983	The Abominable Showman	—	129	—	29	—	Columbia Records
1984	Nick Lowe and His Cowboy Outfit	—	113	—	45	—	Columbia Records
1985	The Rose of England	—	119	100	49	—	Columbia Records
1988	Pinker and Prouder Than Previous	—	—	—	—	—	Columbia Records
1990	Party of One	—	182	127	—	—	Reprise Records
1994	The Impossible Bird	—	—	—	—	—	Upstart Records
1998	Dig My Mood	—	—	—	—	—	Upstart Records
2001	The Convincer	—	—	—	32	—	Proper Records
2007	At My Age	—	—	—	10	—	Proper Records
2011	The Old Magic	66	84	—	9	—	Proper Records
2013	Quality Street: A Seasonal Selection for All the Family	—	—	—	—	—	Proper Records
2024	Indoor Safari (with Los Straitjackets)	—	—	—	—	—	Yep Roc Records
"—" denotes releases that did not chart or were not released in that territory.

=== Live ===
Year	Album	Record label
2004	Untouched Takeaway	Yep Roc Records
2015	The Quality Holiday Revue Live (with Los Straitjackets)	Yep Roc Records
2020	Live at the Haw River Ballroom (with Los Straitjackets)	Yep Roc Records

== EPs ==
Year	Title	Record Label	Format
1977	Bowi	Stiff	7" 45 rpm
1980	Nick Lowe & Dave Edmunds Sing the Everly Brothers	F-Beat / Columbia	7" 33⅓ rpm
1982	My Heart Hurts	F-Beat	Two 7" 45 rpm records
2018	Tokyo Bay / Crying Inside	Yep Roc	Two 7" 45 rpm records/CD
2019	Love Starvation / Trombone	Yep Roc	12" record / CD
2020	Lay It On Me	Yep Roc	12" record / CD

== Singles ==
Year	Title	Peak chart positions						Record Label	B-side	Album	Notes
Year	Title	UK	US Pop	US AC	US Rock	CAN	AUS	Record Label	B-side	Album	Notes
1976	"So It Goes"	—	—	—	—	—	—	Stiff Records	"Heart of the City"	Jesus of Cool	The first Stiff Records label single. The song was featured in the movies Rock 'n' Roll High School and Adventureland.
1976	"Keep It Out of Sight"	—	—	—	—	—	—	Dynamo Records	"(I've Been Taking the) Truth Drug"	Non-album singles	Netherlands-only release
1977	"Halfway to Paradise"	—	—	—	—	—	—	Stiff Records	"I Don't Want the Night to End"	Non-album singles	
1978	"I Love the Sound of Breaking Glass"	7	—	—	—	—	—	Radar Records	"They Called It Rock"	Jesus of Cool	
1978	"Little Hitler"	—	—	—	—	—	—	Radar Records	"Cruel to Be Kind"	Jesus of Cool	
1978	"American Squirm"	—	—	—	—	—	—	Radar Records	"(What's So Funny 'Bout); Peace, Love and Understanding?"	Non-album single	
1979	"Crackin' Up"	34	—	—	—	—	—	Radar Records	"Basing Street"	Labour of Lust	
1979	"Cruel to Be Kind"	12	12	36	—	12	12	Radar Records	"Endless Grey Ribbon"	Labour of Lust	
1979	"Switch Board Susan"	—	107	—	—	81	—	Columbia Records	"Basing Street"	Labour of Lust	North American–only release
1982	"Stick It Where the Sun Don't Shine"	—	—	—	43	35	—	Columbia Records	"My Heart Hurts"	Nick the Knife	
1982	"Burning"	—	—	—	—	—	—	F Beat Records	"Zulu Kiss"	Nick the Knife	
1982	"My Heart Hurts"	—	—	—	—	—	—	F Beat Records	"Pet You and Hold You" (Live)	Nick the Knife	
1983	"Ragin' Eyes"	—	—	—	—	—	—	F Beat Records	"Tanque-Rae"	The Abominable Showman	
1983	"Wish You Were Here"	—	—	—	—	—	—	Columbia Records	"How Do You Talk to an Angel"	The Abominable Showman	US-only release
1984	"Half a Boy and Half a Man"	53	110	—	—	—	66	F Beat Records	"Awesome"	Nick Lowe and His Cowboy Outfit	
1984	"L.A.F.S."	156	—	—	—	—	—	F Beat Records	"(Hey Big Mouth); Stand Up and Say That"	Nick Lowe and His Cowboy Outfit	
1985	"I Knew the Bride (When She Used to Rock 'n' Roll)"	130	77	—	27	—	26	F Beat Records	"Darlin' Angel Eyes"	The Rose of England	
1987	"Lovers Jamboree"	—	—	—	—	—	—	Columbia Records	"Crying in My Sleep"	Pinker and Prouder Than Previous	US-only release
1990	"All Men Are Liars"	177	—	—	—	—	108	Reprise Records	"Gai-Gin Man"	Party of One	
1994	"True Love Travels on a Gravel Road"	—	—	—	—	—	—	Non-album single		The Impossible Bird	
1995	"I Live on a Battlefield"	—	—	—	—	—	—	Diesel Only Records	"Without Love"	The Impossible Bird	
1997	"You Inspire Me"	—	—	—	—	—	—			Dig My Mood	
2001	"She's Got Soul"	—	—	—	—	—	—			The Convincer	
2011	"Go 'Way Hound Dog"	—	—	—	—	—	—	Yep Roc	"(I've Changed My) Wild Mind"	Non-album single	
"—" denotes releases that did not chart or were not released in that territory.

== With Brinsley Schwarz ==
Year	Album	Producer	Record label
1970	Brinsley Schwarz	Brinsley Schwarz, Dave Robinson	United Artists Records
1970	Despite It All	Brinsley Schwarz, Dave Robinson	United Artists Records
1972	Silver Pistol	Brinsley Schwarz, Dave Robinson	United Artists Records
1972	Nervous on the Road	Brinsley Schwarz, Dave Robinson	United Artists Records
1973	Please Don't Ever Change	Brinsley Schwarz, Vic Maile	United Artists Records
1974	The New Favourites of... Brinsley Schwarz	Dave Edmunds	United Artists Records

== With Rockpile ==
Year	Album	Peak chart positions				Producer	Record label
Year	Album	UK	CAN	US	SWE	Producer	Record label
1980	Seconds of Pleasure	34	29	27	8	Nick Lowe & Rockpile	Columbia Records

== With Little Village ==
Year	Album	Peak chart positions			Producer	Record label
Year	Album	UK	SWE	NL	Producer	Record label
1992	Little Village	23	16	18	Little Village	Reprise Records

== Compilation albums ==
- 1984: 16 All Time Lowes (Diabolo) - compilation of Lowe's songs
- 1986: Nick's Knack (Demon) - compilation of Lowe's songs
- 1989: Basher: The Best of Nick Lowe (Demon / Columbia) - compilation of Lowe's songs
- 1991: The Wilderness Years (Demon) - post-Brinsley Schwarz material recorded before the release of Jesus of Cool
- 1998: Hens' Teeth (Edsel) - compilation of singles by Kippington Lodge, Brinsley Schwarz and Brinsley Schwarz under various aliases; includes 9 songs with Lowe as lead vocalist and 4 songs written or co-written by Lowe
- 1999: The Doings: The Solo Years (Demon) - 86-track 4-disc boxed compilation of Lowe's songs
- 2009: Quiet Please... The New Best of Nick Lowe (Proper / Yep Roc) - 49-track compilation of Lowe's songs

== As producer ==
=== For Elvis Costello ===
- 1977: My Aim Is True (Stiff / Columbia)
- 1978: This Year's Model (Radar / Columbia)
- 1978: Live at Hollywood High (Hip-O Select) released 2010
- 1979: Armed Forces (Radar / Columbia)
- 1980: Get Happy!! (F-Beat / Columbia)
- 1980: Taking Liberties (Columbia) 1977-1980 compilation co-produced by Costello and Lowe - also released with alterations as Ten Bloody Marys & Ten How's Your Fathers on F-Beat
- 1981: Trust (F-beat / Columbia) - co-produced with Roger Bechirian
- 1986: Blood & Chocolate (Demon / Columbia) - co-produced with Colin Fairley

=== For others ===
- 1976: Graham Parker and The Rumour - Howlin' Wind - (Vertigo / Mercury)
- 1976: Graham Parker and The Rumour - Heat Treatment (Mercury) - produced the song "Back Door Love"
- 1977: The Damned - Damned Damned Damned (Stiff)
- 1977: Dr. Feelgood - Be Seeing You (United Artists)
- 1977: Graham Parker - Stick to Me (Vertigo / Mercury)
- 1978: Mickey Jupp - Juppanese (Stiff) - produced tracks 1 through 7
- 1978: Wreckless Eric - Wreckless Eric (album) (Stiff) - co-produced with Barry Farmer, Larry Wallis, and Ian Dury
- 1980: Carlene Carter - Musical Shapes (Warner Bros. / F-Beat)
- 1980: Dr. Feelgood - A Case of the Shakes (United Artists)
- 1980: Johnny Cash - Rockabilly Blues (Columbia) - produced the song "Without Love"
- 1980: The Pretenders - Pretenders (Real / Sire) - produced the song "Stop Your Sobbing"
- 1981: Carlene Carter - Blue Nun (Warner Bros. / F-Beat) - co-produced with Roger Bechirian
- 1982: The Fabulous Thunderbirds - T-Bird Rhythm (Chrysalis)
- 1982: Paul Carrack - Suburban Voodoo (Epic)
- 1983: John Hiatt - Riding with the King (Geffen) - produced side 2 of the album
- 1983: The Moonlighters - Rush Hour (Demon)
- 1985: The Men They Couldn't Hang - Night of a Thousand Candles (Demon)
- 1986: The Redskins - Neither Washington Nor Moscow (London) - produced track 5, "Keep On Keepin' On!"
- 1990: Katydids - Katydids (Reprise)

== As primary artist/song contributor ==
- 1977: A Bunch of Stiff Records (Stiff Records) - track 1, "I Love My Label"
- 1978: Live Stiffs Live (Stiff) as Nick Lowe's Last Chicken in the Shop: track 1, "I Knew the Bride (When She Used to Rock 'n' Roll)": track 2, "Let's Eat" (live compilation of the first Stiff tour).
- 1994: various artists - Adios Amigo: A Tribute to Arthur Alexander (Razor & Tie) - track 11, "In the Middle of It All"
- 1996: various artists - Rig Rock Deluxe: A Musical Tribute to the American Truck Driver (Upstart) - track 14, "I'm Coming Home" with the Impossible Birds
- 1999: various artists - Original Soundtrack: Mumford (Hollywood) - track 3, "From Now On"
- 2002: various artists - Evangeline Made: A Tribute to Cajun Music (Vanguard) - track 13, "Arrête Pas la Musique (Don't Stop the Music)"
- 2004: various artists - Sweetheart: Love Songs (Hear Music) - track 1, "It's All in the Game"
- 2011: various artists - Rave On Buddy Holly (Hear Music / Fasntasy) - track 11, "Changing All Those Changes"

== As sideman ==
- 1971: Ernie Graham - Ernie Graham (Liberty) - bass
- 1972: Keith Cross and Peter Ross - Bored Civilians (Decca) - guitar
- 1978: Carlene Carter - Carlene Carter (Warner Bros.) - bass on track 4, "I Once Knew Love"
- 1978: Dave Edmunds - Tracks on Wax 4 (Swan Song) - bass
- 1979: Dave Edmunds - Repeat When Necessary (Swan Song) - bass
- 1981: Dave Edmunds - Twangin... (Swan Song) - bass
- 1984: Elvis Costello - "Out of Our Idiot" (Demon) - duet with Elvis Costello on "Baby It's You"
- 1987: John Hiatt - Bring the Family (A&M) - bass, vocals
- 1991: Elvis Costello - Mighty Like a Rose (Warner Bros.) - bass on track 2, "Hurry Down Doomsday (The Bugs Are Taking Over)"
- 1991: John Lee Hooker - Mr. Lucky (Silvertone) - bass on track 4, "This Is Hip"
- 1994: Elvis Costello - Brutal Youth (Warner Bros.) - bass
- 2001: Los Straitjackets - Sing Along with Los Straitjackets (Yep Roc) - bass on track 11, "Shake That Rat"
- 2004: Tanita Tikaram - Sentimental (Naïve) - backing vocals on track 7, "Don't Let the Cold"
- 2004: Geraint Watkins - Dial 'W' for Watkins (Yep Roc / Proper) - duet with Geraint Watkins on track 13, "Only a Rose"
- 2006: Bill Kirchen - Hammer of the Honky Tonk Gods (Proper) - bass and vocals
- 2009: Martin Belmont - The Guest List (Gold Top) - guest vocals on track 3, "A Man in Love"
- 2010: Bill Kirchen - Word to the Wise (Proper) - duet with Paul Carrack on track 2, "Shelly's Winter Love"
- 2010: Robyn Hitchcock and the Venus 3 - Propellor Time (Sartorial) - vocals
- 2012: Wilco - iTunes Session (dBpm) - lead vocals on track 8, "Cruel to Be Kind"
- 2017: Blackie and the Rodeo Kings - Kings and Kings (File Under Music) - vocals on track 7, "Secret of a Long Lasting Love"

== As composer ==
=== 1972–1979 ===
- 1972: Teddy Rastor - Come On, Come On (Sayton Records) - B-side of single, "Brand New You, Brand New Me"
- 1975: Dave Edmunds - Subtle as a Flying Mallet (RCA)- track 10, "She's My Baby"
- 1975: Dr. Feelgood - Malpractice (Columbia) - track 10, "Because You're Mine" (co-written with John B. Sparks and Wilko Johnson)
- 1976: Kursaal Flyers - The Great Artiste (UK Records) - track 9, "Television"
- 1976: Dave Edmunds - Here Comes the Weekend (Swan Song Records) - A-side of single
- 1977: Dave Edmunds - Get It (Swan Song) - track 2, "I Knew the Bride"; track 4, "Here Comes the Weekend" (co-written with Dave Edmunds); track 11, "What Did I Do Last Night?"; track 12, "Little Darlin'" (co-written with Dave Edmunds)
- 1977: The Rumour - Max (Mercury) - track 1, "Mess With Love"
- 1978: Dave Edmunds - Tracks on Wax 4 (Swan Song) - track 2, "Never Been in Love" (co-written with Rockpile); track 4, "Television"; track 5, "What Looks Best on You" (co-written with Dave Edmunds); track 7, "Deborah" (co-written with Dave Edmunds); track 11, "Heart of the City"
- 1978: Dr. Feelgood - Private Practice (United Artists) - track 4, "Milk And Alcohol" and track 8, "It Wasn't Me" (both co-written with Gypie Mayo)
- 1978: Lene Lovich - Stateless (Stiff) - track 6, "Tonight"
- 1978: Leo Kottke - Burnt Lips (Chrysalis) - track 1, "Endless Sleep"
- 1978: The Rumour - Frogs Sprouts Clogs and Krauts (Stiff) - track B1 "Leaders" (co-written with Martin Belmont)
- 1979: Carlene Carter - Two Sides to Every Woman (Warner Bros.) - track 1, "Do It in a Heartbeat" (co-written with Carlene Carter)
- 1979: Dr. Feelgood - As It Happens (United Artists) - track 10, "Milk and Alcohol" (co-written with Gypie Mayo)

=== 1980–1989 ===
- 1980: The Rumour - Purity of Essence (Stiff) - track 2, "I Don't Ever Want the Night to End"
- 1981: Dave Edmunds - Twangin... (Swan Song) - track 4, "(I'm Gonna Start) Living Again If It Kills Me" (co-written with Carlene Carter and Dave Edmunds); track 9, "I'm Only Human" (co-written with Rockpile)
- 1981: The Fabulous Thunderbirds - Butt Rockin' (Chrysalis) - track 2, "One's Too Many" (co-written with Kim Wilson)
- 1982: Paul Carrack - Suburban Voodoo (Epic) - track 3, "I Need You" (co-written with Martin Belmont and Paul Carrack); track 4, "I'm in Love" (co-written with Carlene Carter); track 5, "Don't Give My Heart a Break" (co-written with Carlene Carter and Paul Carrack); track 8, "What a Way to Go" and track 9, "So Right, So Wrong" (both co-written with J. E. Ceiling, James Eller, Martin Belmont, and Paul Carrack); track 10, "From Now On"
- 1983: Alvin Stardust - A Picture of You (Stiff) - track 4, "What Looks Good On You Is Me" (co-written with Dave Edmunds)
- 1983: Carlene Carter C'est C Bon (Epic) - track 9, "Don't Give My Heart a Break" (co-written with Carlene Carter and Paul Carrack)
- 1985: Don Dixon - Most of the Girls Like to Dance but Only Some of the Boys Like To (Enigma) - track 3, "Skin Deep"
- 1985: Queen Ida And Her Zydeco Band - Caught in the Act! (GNP Crescendo) - track 6, "Half a Boy, Half a Man"
- 1986: The Men They Couldn't Hang - How Green Is the Valley (MCA) - track 6, "Wishing Well"
- 1987: Dave Edmunds - I Hear You Rockin' (Columbia) - track 2, "Here Comes the Weekend" (co-written with Dave Edmunds); track 10, "I Knew the Bride (When She Used to Rock and Roll)"
- 1987: The Oyster Band - Wide Blue Yonder (Cooking Vinyl) - track 7, "The Rose of England"

=== 1990–1999 ===
- 1990: The Flaming Lips - In a Priest Driven Ambulance (Restless / Plain) - track D3.2, "(What's So Funny 'Bout) Peace, Love, and Understanding" bonus track on 2005 reissue
- 1991: Diana Ross - The Force Behind the Power (Motown) - track 3, "Battlefield" (co-written with Paul Carrack)
- 1992: various artists - The Bodyguard (soundtrack) (Arista) - track 10, "(What's So Funny 'Bout) Peace, Love and Understanding" performed by Curtis Stigers
- 1993: Freakwater - Feels Like the Third Time (Thrill Jockey) - track 6, "You Make Me"
- 1994: Johnny Cash - American Recordings (American) - track 3, "The Beast in Me"
- 1995: The Minus 5 - Old Liquidator (East Side Digital) - track 10, "Basing Street"
- 1998: Linda Ronstadt featuring Aaron Neville - Cry Like a Rainstorm, Howl Like the Wind (Elektra) - track 4, "I Need You" (co-written with Martin Belmont and Paul Carrack); track 9, "So Right, So Wrong" (co-written with J. E. Ceiling, James Eller, Martin Belmont, and Paul Carrack)
- 1998: The Mavericks - Trampoline (MCA Nashville) - track 14, "All I Get" (co-written with Raul Malo)
- 1998: Rod Stewart - When We Were the New Boys (Warner Bros.) - track 7, "Shelly My Love"
- 1999: George Thorogood & the Destroyers - Half a Boy/Half a Man (CMC International) - track 4, "Half a Boy, Half a Man"
- 1999: various artists - 10 Things I Hate About You (Music from the Motion Picture) (Hollywood) - track 13, "Cruel to Be Kind" (performed by Letters To Cleo)

=== 2000–2009 ===
- 2000: Charlie Hunter - Solo Eight String Guitar (Contra Punto) - track 12, "(What's So Funny 'Bout) Peace, Love and Understanding?"
- 2000: The Corn Sisters - The Other Women (Mint) - track 13, "Endless Grey Ribbon"
- 2000: Dave Edmunds - Live (Castle Music) - track 7, "I Knew the Bride (When She Used to Rock & Roll)"
- 2000: Langhorns - Langhorns (Bad Taste) - track 12, "Awesome"
- 2002: Solomon Burke - Don't Give Up on Me (Fat Possum) - track 9, "The Other Side of the Coin"
- 2003: Robben Ford - Keep On Running (Concord) - track 5, "(What's So Funny 'Bout) Peace, Love, and Understanding"
- 2003: George Thorogood and the Destroyers - Ride 'Til I Die (Eagle) - track 10, "That's It, I Quit"
- 2004: A Perfect Circle - Emotive (Virgin) - track 3, "(What's So Funny 'Bout) Peace, Love, and Understanding"
- 2007: The Holmes Brothers - State of Grace - (Alligator) - track 3, "(What's So Funny 'Bout) Peace, Love, and Understanding"
- 2007: P.J. Olsson - American Scream (CBS Records) - track 13, "(What's So Funny 'Bout) Peace, Love, and Understanding"
- 2007: Fatboy Slim - Late Night Tales - track 3, "I Love the Sound of Breaking Glass"
- 2008: Brian Burns - Border Radio (Crystal Clear / Presidio) - track 14, "Lately I've Let Things Slide"
- 2008: Katy Moffatt - Fewer Things (Zeppelin) - track 3, "What Lack of Love Has Done"
- 2008: Neal Morse - Lifeline (Radiant) - bonus disc track 4, "(What's So Funny 'Bout) Peace, Love, and Understanding"
- 2009: The BPA - I Think We're Gonna Need a Bigger Boat (Southern Fried) - track 12, "So It Goes"
- 2009: Kimon & The Prophets - Roadhouse Party (Ultrascene) - track 9, "(What's So Funny 'Bout) Peace, Love, and Understanding"
- 2009: Larz-Kristerz - Om du vill (Sony) - track 4, "Half a Boy and Half a Man"
- 2009: Taylor Hicks - The Distance (Adrenaline / Modern Whomp) - track 9, "I Live on a Battlefield" (co-written with Paul Carrack)
- 2009: Seth Walker - Leap of Faith (Hyena) - track 8, "Lately I've Let Things Slide"
- 2009: Simple Minds - Graffiti Soul (Universal) - track 6, "(What's So Funny 'Bout) Peace, Love, and Understanding" (on Searching for the Lost Boys bonus disc)

=== 2010–2017 ===
- 2010: Carrie Rodriguez - Love and Circumstance (Ninth Street Opus) - track 1, "Big Love" (co-written with Ry Cooder, John Hiatt, and Jim Keltner)
- 2010: Paul Carrack - A Different Hat (Absolute UK / Carrack) - track 5, "I Live on a Battlefield" (co-written with Paul Carrack)
- 2011: Jonell Mosser - Fortunes Lost, Fortunes Told (Brothers Mothers Music) - track 11, "Rome Wasn't Built in a Day"
- 2011: Wilco - The Whole Love (Anti- / Epitaph) - track 13, "I Love My Label" (bonus track)
- 2012: Paul Carrack - Good Feeling (Carrack / Universal) - track 8, "From Now On"
- 2012: Wilco - iTunes Session (dBpm) - track 8, "Cruel to Be Kind"
- 2013: Colin Gilmore - The Wild and Hollow (Woobietown) - track 10, "Raging Eyes"
- 2013: Kathy Greenholdt - When You're Dead (CD Baby) - track 10, "The Beast in Me"
- 2013: Mavis Staples - One True Vine (Anti-) - track 5, "Far Celestial Shore"
- 2013: The Strypes - Snapshot (Universal) - track 12, ""Heart of the City"
- 2014: David Broza - East Jerusalem/West Jerusalem (BMG / S-Curve) - track 9, "(What's So Funny 'Bout) Peace, Love, and Understanding"
- 2014: JD McPherson - The Warm Covers EP (New Rounder) - track 3, "Rome Wasn't Built In a Day"
- 2017: Billy Valentine - Brit Eyed Soul (Cleopatra) - track 12, "(What's So Funny 'Bout) Peace, Love, and Understanding"

== Live radio performances ==
- 1995: various artists - 2 Meter Sessies - Volume 6 (Radio Records) - track 9, "True Love Travels on a Gravel Road"
- 1996: various artists - Q107's Concerts in the Sky: The Campfire Versions (MCA Records Canada) - track 5, "(What's So Funny 'Bout) Peace Love and Understanding"
- 1996: various artists - KGSR Broadcast, Volume 6 (KGSR) - track 2-3, "Soulful Wind"
- 2002: various artists - Live at the World Cafe, 10th Anniversary (World Cafe) - track 2-6, "(What's So Funny 'Bout) Peace Love and Understanding"
- 2008: various artists - Live at the World Cafe, Volume 24 (World Cafe) - track 9, "I Trained Her to Love Me"
- 2011: "Comedy Bang! Bang!" podcast episode 126, featured "Stoplight Roses," "Sensitive Man," "All Men Are Liars," and "(What's So Funny 'Bout) Peace, Love, and Understanding"
- 2012: various artists - The Old Grey Whistle Test Live (BBC / Rhino) - track 3-12, "Sensitive Man"
- 2013: Wait Wait... Don't Tell Me! (NPR) featured "(What's So Funny 'Bout) Peace Love and Understanding" and "Christmas at the Airport"

== Tributes ==
- 2001: various artists - Labour of Love: The Music of Nick Lowe (Telarc) - 13 songs featuring Dar Williams, Tom Petty, Elvis Costello, and others
- 2005: various artists - Lowe Profile: A Tribute to Nick Lowe (Brewery) two-disc, 30-song collection featuring Dave Alvin, Foster & Lloyd, Ian Gomm, and others
- 2002: various artists - The Stiff Generation: If It Ain't Stiff It Ain't Worth a Tribute (Groove Disques) - track 1, "So It Goes"; track 9, "Endless Sleep"; track 14, "I Love the Sound of Breaking Glass"; track 24: "I Love My Label"
- 2005: Elizabeth McQueen and the Firebrands - Happy Doing What We’re Doing (Freedom [City Hall]) tribute to pub rock features several songs written and co-written by Lowe
- 2009: various artists - Si No Es Stiff No Merece un Tributo (Culturapop / Rock Indiana) - Spanish compilation features 3 songs written by Lowe
- 2012: various artists - Lowe Country: The Songs of Nick Lowe (Fiesta Red) - 13 songs featuring Ron Sexsmith, Robert Ellis, Chatham County Line and others
- 2014: Davey Lane - Under the Covers includes covers of all 11 songs from Jesus of Cool
- 2015: Duck the Piano Wire - Duck the Knife subtitled A Homemade Remake of Nick the Knife, includes covers of all 12 songs
- 2017: Los Straitjackets - What's So Funny About Peace, Love and Los Straitjackets (Yep Roc) instrumental versions of Nick Lowe compositions

== Cinema ==
- 1979: various artists - Americathon (soundtrack) (Lorimar) - track 6, "Without Love"
- 1979: various artists - That Summer (soundtrack) (Arista) - track 14, "(I Love the Sound of) Breaking Glass"
- 1979: various artists featuring The Ramones - Rock 'n' Roll High School (soundtrack) (Sire) - track 5, "So It Goes"
- 1983: Easy Money (soundtrack) (CBS Records) - track 5, "We Want Action"
- 1986: Absolute Beginners (soundtrack) (Virgin) - Lowe contributed an original song, "Little Cat (You've Never Had It So Good)"
- 1995: Australian film All Men Are Liars featured Lowe's song "All Men Are Liars"

== Television ==
- 1995: The Brothers Grunt (MTV) season 4, episode 30, "The Ugly Gruntling" featured the music video for "All Men Are Liars"
- 1999: The Sopranos (HBO) season 1, episode 1 featured Lowe's recording of "The Beast in Me"
- 2011: True Blood (HBO) season 4, episode 43, "Cold Grey Light of Dawn" featured Lowe's song "Cold Grey Light of Dawn"
