= Quiet Please... The New Best of Nick Lowe =

Greatest hits album by Nick Lowe
- Released: 17 March 2009
- Length: 2:35:19
- Label: Proper

Nick Lowe chronology
At My Age (2007)	Quiet Please... The New Best of Nick Lowe (2009)	The Old Magic (2011)

Professional ratings
Review scores
Source	Rating
Allmusic	4.5/5 stars

Quiet Please... The New Best of Nick Lowe is a 49-track career-spanning collection of songs written by British songwriter Nick Lowe. As well as his solo work, it also features many of his collaborations with the likes of Rockpile, Brinsley Schwarz, Paul Carrack and Little Village. The compilation was released by Proper Records in the UK and Europe and by Yep Roc in the US. The collection was compiled by Gregg Geller.

== Track listing ==
All songs written by Nick Lowe except where noted.

=== Disc One ===
1. "(What's So Funny 'Bout) Peace, Love, and Understanding" (as Brinsley Schwarz) - 3:33
2. "So It Goes" - 2:33
3. "Heart of the City" - 2:07
4. "Endless Sleep" - 4:08
5. "Marie Provost" - 2:49
6. "I Love the Sound of Breaking Glass" (Lowe, Andrew Bodnar, Steve Goulding) - 3:13
7. "Cracking Up" - 2:58
8. "American Squirm" - 2:31
9. "Cruel to Be Kind" (Ian Gomm, Lowe) - 3:28
10. "Without Love" - 2:28
11. "You Make Me" - 1:52
12. "When I Write the Book" (Lowe, Rockpile) - 3:16
13. "Play That Fast Thing (One More Time)" - 4:11
14. "Burning" - 2:03
15. "Heart" (Lowe, Rockpile) - 3:41
16. "Raining, Raining" - 2:48
17. "Ragin' Eyes" - 2:40
18. "Mess Around with Love" - 3:06
19. "Wish You Were Here" - 3:15
20. "L.A.F.S." - 3:33
21. "Half a Boy and Half a Man" - 2:53
22. "The Gee and the Rick and the Three Card Trick" - 4:21
23. "The Rose of England" - 3:26
24. "I Knew the Bride (When She Used to Rock and Roll)" - 4:24
25. "Wishing Well" - 3:01

=== Disc Two ===
1. "Lovers Jamboree" (Paul Carrack, Lowe) - 3:37
2. "Shting-Shtang" - 3:20
3. "All Men Are Liars" - 3:22
4. "What's Shakin’ on The Hill" - 4:01
5. "Don’t Think About Her When You're Trying To Drive" (Demo) (Jim Keltner, John Hiatt, Ry Cooder) - 2:58
6. "Fool Who Knows" (Keltner, Hiatt, Cooder) - 3:45
7. "Soulful Wind" - 3:01
8. "The Beast in Me" - 2:28
9. "I Live on a Battlefield" (Paul Carrack, Lowe) - 3:25
10. "Shelley My Love" - 3:15
11. "You Inspire Me" - 3:09
12. "Lonesome Reverie" - 2:52
13. "Faithless Lover" - 2:46
14. "What Lack of Love Has Done" - 2:48
15. "Man That I’ve Become" - 2:53
16. "Lately I’ve Let Things Slide" - 3:05
17. "Homewrecker" - 3:08
18. "Has She Got a Friend?" - 2:38
19. "Let's Stay in and Make Love" - 3:49
20. "Indian Queens" - 3:43
21. "I Trained Her to Love Me" (Lowe, Bobby Irwin) - 3:00
22. "People Change" - 2:54
23. "Long Limbed Girl" - 2:53
24. "Hope For Us All" - 3:41

== DVD ==
Full band concert recorded in Belgium 2007. The DVD also contains rare music videos.

Nick Lowe and Gold Top Live at Ancienne Belgique Brussels, Belgium 20 October 2007

- Nick Lowe – vocals, guitar
- Johnny Scott – guitar
- Geraint Watkins – keyboards
- Matt Radford – bass
- Bobby Irwin – drums

=== Track listing ===
1. "People Change"
2. "Soulful Wind"
3. "What's Shakin on the Hill"
4. "Heart"
5. "All Men Are Liars"
6. "Without Love"
7. "Has She Got A Friend"
8. "I Trained Her To Love Me"
9. "Cruel To Be Kind"
10. "You Inspire Me"
11. "Long Limbed Girl"
12. "Shting-Shtang"
13. "Rome Wasn't Built in a Day"
14. "I Knew The Bride (When She Used To Rock And Roll)"
15. "(What's So Funny 'Bout) Peace, Love And Understanding"
16. "Heart of the City"
17. "The Beast in Me"

=== Videos ===
1. "I Love The Sound of Breaking Glass"
2. "Little Hitler"
3. "No Reason"
4. "Cruel To Be Kind"
5. "Cracking Up"
6. "Ragin Eyes"
7. "Half A Boy And Half A Man"
8. "I Knew The Bride (When She Used To Rock And Roll)"
9. "All Men Are Liars"

== Personnel ==
Musicians:

- Nick Lowe – acoustic guitar, bass, guitar, electric guitar, rhythm guitar, 8-string bass, cardboard box
- Bob Andrews – piano, keyboards, background vocals
- Ben Barson – piano, Hammond organ
- Roger Bechirian – organ, tambourine, background vocals
- Martin Belmont – guitar, electric guitar
- Jeff Blythe – saxophone
- Aldo Bocca – guitar
- Andrew Bodnar – bass
- Shane Bradley – bass
- Billy Bremner – guitar, background vocals
- Brinsley Schwarz – electric guitar, background vocals
- Neil Brockbank – vox organ
- Ray Brown – string bass
- Paul Carrack – organ, piano, keyboards, Hammond organ, background vocals
- Carlene Carter – piano, Hammond organ
- Mario Cippolina – bass
- Johnny Colla – guitar, saxophone, background vocals
- Ry Cooder – electric guitar
- Elvis Costello – background vocals
- Stefan Henry Cush – electric guitar, background vocals
- Austin DeLone – acoustic guitar, piano
- Steve Donnelly – guitar
- Dave Edmunds – organ, guitar, piano, electric guitar, background vocals
- James Eller – bass
- Bill Gibson – percussion, drums, background vocals
- Ian Gomm – guitar, background vocals
- Steve Goulding – drums
- Gary Grainger – fuzz guitar
- Chris Hayes – guitar, background vocals
- John Hiatt – guitar, vocals
- Matt Holland – piano, trumpet, flugelhorn
- Sean Hopper – keyboards, background vocals
- Bobby Irwin – drums, background vocals
- Jim Keltner – drums
- Neill King – piano, Hammond organ
- Bill Kirchen – trombone, electric guitar
- Huey Lewis – harmonica, background vocals
- Bob Loveday – violin, viola
- Steve Nieve – piano, Hammond organ
- Tessa Niles – background vocals
- Jon Henry Odgers – drums
- Phillip Frederick Odgers – acoustic guitar, background vocals
- Jimmy Paterson – trombone
- Nick Pentelow – tenor saxophone
- Dave Plews – trumpet
- Matt Radford – double bass
- Billy Rankin – percussion, drums
- Paul Riley – bass
- Paul Simmonds – bouzouki, guitar
- Paul Speare – saxophone
- Linnea Svensson – background vocals
- Bruce Thomas – bass
- Pete Thomas – drums
- Robert Trehern – drums, background vocals
- Geraint Watkins – organ, piano, electric guitar
- Terry Williams – drums
- Martin Winning – tenor saxophone

Production personnel:

- Vic Anesini – Mastering
- Paul Bass – Producer
- Roger Bechirian – Producer
- Will Birch – Liner Notes
- Neil Brockbank – Producer
- Dan Burn-Forti – Photography
- Elvis Costello – Producer
- Dave Edmunds – Producer
- Colin Fairley – Producer
- Gregg Geller – Liner Notes, Compilation Producer
- Huey Lewis – Producer
- Michael Putland – Photography
- Jake Rivier – Producer
