= The Old Magic =

Studio album by Nick Lowe
- Released: 13 September 2011
- Studio: Goldtop Studio, Camden, London; RAK Studios, St. John's Wood, London
- Genre: Soft rock
- Length: 35:21
- Label: UK: Proper; US: Yep Roc
- Producer: Neil Brockbank, Nick Lowe, Robert Treherne

Nick Lowe chronology
Quiet Please... The New Best of Nick Lowe (2009)	The Old Magic (2011)	Quality Street: A Seasonal Selection for All the Family (2013)

The Old Magic is a 2011 album created by British singer-songwriter Nick Lowe. Publications such as Allmusic have released positive reviews, with critic Stephen Thomas Erlewine regarding the work as featuring "plenty of charm" and labeling Lowe a "crooner". In addition, Mojo placed the album at number thirty-one on its list of "Top 50 albums of 2011."

== Track listing ==
All tracks composed by Nick Lowe except where noted.

1. "Stoplight Roses" – 3:28
2. "Checkout Time" – 2:52
3. "House for Sale" – 3:41
4. "Sensitive Man" – 2:52
5. "I Read a Lot" – 3:17
6. "Shame on the Rain" (Tom T. Hall) – 2:24
7. "Restless Feeling" – 2:40
8. "The Poisoned Rose" (Elvis Costello) – 4:46
9. "Somebody Cares for Me" (Lowe, Geraint Watkins) – 2:50
10. "You Don't Know Me at All" (Jeff West) – 3:06
11. "'Til the Real Thing Comes Along" – 3:25

== Personnel ==
- Nick Lowe – rhythm guitar
- Robert Treherne – drums
- Geraint Watkins – organ, piano
- Steve Donnelly – lead guitar
- Neil Brockbank – vibraphone, mixing
- Johnny Scott – guitar
- Matt Radford – double bass

with:

- Paul Carrack – backing vocals
- Anna Harvey – backing vocals
- Matt Holland – trumpet on 4, 5, flugelhorn on 4
- Bob Loveday – violin and viola on 1, 5, recorder on 1
- Rory McLeod – bass harmonica on 1
- Nick Payne – baritone saxophone on 9
- Ron Sexsmith – backing vocals
- Kate St. John – string synthesizer on 7
- Linnea Svensson – backing vocals on 7
- Jimmie Vaughan – guitar on 10
- Annie Whitehead – trombone on 10
- Martin Winning – tenor saxophone on 10
- Norman Bergen – the gift of the string chart on "I Read a Lot"
