= Untouched Takeaway =

Live album by Nick Lowe
- Released: 2004
- Recorded: March 1995 and autumn 2001
- Genre: Rock
- Length: 56:56
- Label: Yep Roc
- Producer: Nick Lowe; Neil Brockbank

Nick Lowe chronology
The Convincer (2001)	Untouched Takeaway (2004)	At My Age (2007)

Professional ratings
Review scores
Source	Rating
AllMusic	3.5/5 stars

Untouched Takeaway is an album by British singer-songwriter Nick Lowe. A live recording produced by Lowe and Neil Brockbank, it was released in 2004 by Yep Roc Records. The name is from the song "Lately I've Let Things Slide" from Lowe's album The Convincer:

"That untouched takeaway
I brought home the other day
Has quite a lot to say
The evidence is clear
On every side
Piled high and wide
About how lately I've let things slide"

== Track listing ==
All songs written by Nick Lowe except where noted.

1. "What's Shaking on the Hill" – 3:30
2. "Faithless Lover" – 3:14
3. "I Live on a Battlefield" (Paul Carrack, Lowe) – 3:36
4. "You Inspire Me" – 3:27
5. "Cruel to Be Kind" (Ian Gomm, Lowe) – 3:22
6. "Indian Queens" – 3:52
7. "Let's Stay In and Make Love" – 4:03
8. "Shting Shtang" – 3:26
9. "The Beast in Me" – 2:40
10. "(What's So Funny 'Bout) Peace, Love and Understanding?" – 4:03
11. "12-Step Program (To Quit You Babe)"* – 3:17
12. "Dream Girl"* (Jan Crutchfield, Jerry Crutchfield) – 2:40
13. "Without Love"* – 2:23
14. "14 Days"* – 3:18
15. "Tombstone Every Mile"** (Dan Fulkerson) – 3:46
16. "Shelley My Love"* – 3:40
17. "I'll Be There"* (Rusty Gabbard, Ray Price) – 2:39

Tracks 1–10 The Convincers - Selections from the Autumn 2001 European Tour
Tracks 11–17 The Impossible Birds - Live at Gino's, Stockholm, March 1995

== Personnel ==
- Nick Lowe – lead vocals, rhythm guitars, bass guitar
- Geraint Watkins – keyboards, vocals
- Steve Donnelly – lead guitars (1–10)
- Bill Kirchen – lead guitars (11–17), vocals (11–17), lead vocals (15)
- Paul Riley – bass guitar (11–17), vocals (11–17)
- Robert Trehern – drums, vocals
