= The Wilderness Years (album) =

Compilation album by Nick Lowe
- Released: 1991
- Recorded: 1974–1977
- Genre: Rock; Pub Rock
- Length: 49:24
- Label: Demon
- Producer: Nick Lowe

Nick Lowe chronology
Party of One (1990)	The Wilderness Years (1991)	The Impossible Bird (1994)

The Wilderness Years is a CD by British singer-songwriter Nick Lowe. It was released in 1991 in the United Kingdom. It was not released in the United States. The album contains material recorded following the demise of the band Brinsley Schwarz, which featured Lowe as the singer and bass player, and before the release of Lowe's first solo album, Jesus of Cool (titled Pure Pop for Now People in the U.S.) in early 1978.

Three tracks were previously released on other albums, while others were issued on singles or EP's. "I Love My Label" was included on the 1977 Stiff Records sampler album A Bunch of Stiff Records. "Rollers Show" and the studio version of "Heart of the City" were both included on Pure Pop for Now People (but were not contained on Jesus of Cool).

It received a four and a half rating by AllMusic, which noted, "Divided equally between gems and glorious throwaways, The Wilderness Years is all over the place, but that's its charm."

== Track listing ==
All tracks composed by Nick Lowe except where noted.

1. "Fool Too Long" – 3:05
2. "Let's Go to the Disco" – 2:36
3. "Everybody Dance" (Lowe/Daniel Adler) – 2:15
4. "Bay City Rollers We Love You" – 3:13
5. "Allorolla, Part One" – 2:57
6. "Rollers Show" – 3:32
7. "Heart of the City" (Studio Version) – 2:01
8. "Halfway to Paradise" (Gerry Goffin/Carole King) – 2:28
9. "Truth Drug" – 1:39
10. "Born a Woman" (Martha Sharpe) – 2:30
11. "Endless Sleep" – 4:05
12. "Shake That Rat" – 2:12
13. "I Love My Label" – 3:02
14. "I Don't Want the Night to End" – 1:58
15. "So Heavy" – 1:53
16. "Keep It Out of Sight" (Wilko Johnson) – 2:52
17. "Heart" – 3:53
18. "I Got a Job" – 3:06
