= Quality Street: A Seasonal Selection for All the Family =

Studio album by Nick Lowe
- Released: 29 October 2013
- Studio: Gravity Shack Studios, Tooting Bec, London
- Genre: Holiday, Christmas Music, Rock, Americana
- Label: Yep Roc
- Producer: Nick Lowe, Robert Treherne, Neil Brockbank

Nick Lowe chronology
| The Old Magic (2011) | Quality Street: A Seasonal Selection for All the Family (2013) | The Quality Holiday Revue (Live) (2015) |

Quality Street: A Seasonal Selection for All the Family is a studio album by the British singer-songwriter Nick Lowe. The album was released on 29 October 2013 by Yep Roc Records. The album was featured at number 17 on Rolling Stone's "40 Essential Christmas Albums" list on 30 November 2019.

== Background and recording ==
Quality Street was released following Lowe's 2011 studio album, The Old Magic.

Nick Lowe was approached by his label, Yep Roc Records, to make a Christmas themed album. Lowe's initial reaction was negative, but he later agreed to take on the project, as he said in an interview with The Current radio station on 20 December 2013.

The album was recorded at Gravity Shack Studios in Tooting Bec, London. This studio has since been renamed as Silver Shark Studios. While recording in the studios Lowe said, "We tried to make it a sleigh-bell free atmosphere."

Quality Street features three Nick Lowe originals: "Christmas at the Airport", "I Was Born in Bethlehem", and "A Dollar Short of Happy". Lowe also covers Roger Miller's "Old Toy Trains" and Wizzard's "I Wish It Could Be Christmas Everyday". "Hooves on the Roof" was composed by Ron Sexsmith expressly for this album.

As a promotional event by Yep Roc, Quality Street was streamed in its entirety for 24 hours on YouTube on 25 July 2013.

== Critical reception ==
Professional ratings
Review scores
| Source | Rating |
|---|---|
| AllMusic | 3.5/5 stars |
| Uncut | 4/5 stars |

In a review for AllMusic, Stephen Thomas Erlewine said, "Easing into his second decade as a dapper crooner, it's little wonder that Nick Lowe has succumbed to the siren call that seduces every gentleman vocalist: he's gone and made a Christmas album."

The Washington Post covered the album in an article posted on 29 November 2013. Chris Klimek began the article with, "In the A.D. era of Christmas albums — that would be After Dylan — nobody who releases one can seem too dark a horse. Still, Nick Lowe, who called his first solo album “Jesus of Cool” (it was retitled in these more sensitive United States), isn't the likeliest candidate".

On 8 December 2013 Lowe performed "Christmas at the Airport" during an interview for NPR.

Quality Street was given 4 out of 5 stars by the London-based publication, Uncut, on 17 December 2013. Luke Torn began his review with, "Ol’ Saint Nick, playful pop alchemy, and the retro-reinvention of the Christmas album..."

Quality Street was named Album of the Week by The Independent on 21 December 2013. Andy Gill began the article with, "With Quality Street, Nick Lowe manages the virtually impossible, delivering a Christmas album that's both inventive and irony-free, and seasonally warm without pushing any of the usual commercial buttons".

== Track listing ==
| No. | Title | Writer(s) | Length |
|---|---|---|---|
| 1. | "Children Go Where I Send Thee" | Traditional; arranged by Nick Lowe | 2:41 |
| 2. | "Christmas Can't Be Far Away" | Boudleaux Bryant | 3:30 |
| 3. | "Christmas at the Airport" | Nick Lowe | 3:49 |
| 4. | "Old Toy Trains" | Roger Miller | 3:00 |
| 5. | "The North Pole Express" | Traditional; arranged by Nick Lowe | 2:45 |
| 6. | "Hooves on the Roof" | Ron Sexsmith | 3:33 |
| 7. | "I Was Born in Bethlehem" | Nick Lowe | 3:23 |
| 8. | "Just to Be with You (This Christmas)" | Ross Bon | 3:31 |
| 9. | "Rise Up Shepherd" | Traditional; arranged by Nick Lowe | 2:57 |
| 10. | "Silent Night" | Franz Gruber, Joseph Mohr; arranged by Nick Lowe | 2:40 |
| 11. | "A Dollar Short of Happy" | Nick Lowe, Ry Cooder | 2:45 |
| 12. | "I Wish It Could Be Christmas Everyday" | Roy Wood | 4:21 |
| Total length: | | | 38:55 |

== Personnel ==
- Nick Lowe - lead vocals, acoustic guitar, producer
- Geraint Watkins - keyboards
- Johnny Scott - guitar
- Matt Radford - bass
- Robert Treherne - drums, producer

Technical

- Peta Waddington - design
- Rose Blake - illustration
- Tim Young - vinyl mastering
- Dan Burn-Forti - photography
- Neil Brockbank - producer, recording
- Tucker Nelson - recording
