= The Convincer =

Studio album by Nick Lowe
- Released: 11 September 2001
- Recorded: May 2000 – April 2001
- Studio: RAK Studios and St. John's Wood (London, UK); The Barge (Twickenham, Middlesex, UK)
- Genre: Singer-Songwriter
- Length: 38:02
- Label: Proper, Yep Roc
- Producer: Nick Lowe; Neil Brockbank

Nick Lowe chronology
Dig My Mood (1998)	The Convincer (2001)	Untouched Takeaway (2004)

Professional ratings
Aggregate scores
Source	Rating
Metacritic	86/100
Review scores
Source	Rating
AllMusic	4/5 stars
Entertainment Weekly	B+
The Guardian	3/5 stars
Q	3/5 stars

The Convincer is a 2001 studio album by British singer-songwriter Nick Lowe. Produced by Lowe and Neil Brockbank, it was released in Europe by Proper Records and by Yep Roc Records in the United States.

== Track listing ==
All songs by Nick Lowe, except where noted.

1. "Homewrecker"
2. "Only a Fool Breaks His Own Heart" (Norman Bergen, Shelly Coburn)
3. "Lately I've Let Things Slide"
4. "She's Got Soul"
5. "Cupid Must Be Angry"
6. "Indian Queens"
7. "Poor Side of Town" (Johnny Rivers, Lou Adler)
8. "I'm a Mess"
9. "Between Dark and Dawn"
10. "Bygones (Won't Go)"
11. "Has She Got a Friend?"
12. "Let's Stay In and Make Love"

Copies of the album sold by Borders included a 3-inch bonus CD-EP:

1. "There Will Never Be Any Peace (Until God Is Seated at the Conference Table)" (Eugene Record, Barbara Acklin)
2. "Different Kind of Blue"
3. "Mama Said" (Luther Dixon, Willie Denson)

In 2021, Yep Roc reissued the album on vinyl for its 20th anniversary, including a 7" single with these three tracks.

== Personnel ==
- Nick Lowe – vocals, rhythm guitars, bass
- Geraint Watkins – acoustic piano, organ
- Steve Donnelly – lead guitars
- Robert Treherne – drums

Additional musicians

- Matt Holland – flugelhorn (3)
- Wayne Jackson – trumpet (5)
- The St. Keverne Band – brass and horns (6)
- Richie Buckley – tenor saxophone (7, 8)
- Tessa Niles – backing vocals (12)

=== Production ===
- Nick Lowe – producer
- Neil Brockman – producer
- Michael Boddy – studio assistant
- Kenny Paterson – studio assistant
- Peta Waddington – design
- Dan Burn-Forti – photography
