= Pinker and Prouder Than Previous =

Studio album by Nick Lowe
- Released: February 1988
- Recorded: 1986–1987
- Studio: Arlyn (Austin, Texas, USA); Power Plant and Westside (London, England); Rockfield (Monmouthshire, Wales)
- Genre: Rock
- Length: 33:23
- Label: Columbia
- Producer: Nick Lowe; Colin Fairley; Dave Edmunds

Nick Lowe chronology
The Rose of England (1985)	Pinker and Prouder Than Previous (1988)	Party of One (1990)

Pinker and Prouder Than Previous is a 1988 album by British singer-songwriter Nick Lowe. It was released by Demon Records in the UK and Europe, and was his final album for Columbia Records in the US.

On 20 October 2017 Yep Roc Records reissued it on CD and LP, marking its first release on compact disc in the US.

== Reception ==
Professional ratings
Review scores
Source	Rating
AllMusic	3/5 stars
Robert Christgau	B+
The Philadelphia Inquirer	4/4 stars

Spin wrote, "Plainer and Poorer than Previous is more like it. Lowe lives up to his nickname, 'Basher,' by knocking out a set of tunes that, for the large part, sound as if little care or thought was put into them. I'm beginning to wonder if the Jesus of Cool is becoming a lazy Judas."

== Track listing ==
All songs written by Nick Lowe except as noted.

1. "(You're My) Wildest Dream" – 3:19
2. "Crying in My Sleep" – 3:56
3. "Big Hair" – 2:13
4. "Love Gets Strange" (John Hiatt) – 3:30
5. "I Got the Love" – 2:43
6. "Black Lincoln Continental" (Graham Parker) – 2:36
7. "Cry It Out" – (Nick Lowe, Profile) 2:56
8. "Lovers Jamboree" (Nick Lowe, Paul Carrack) – 3:37
9. "Geisha Girl" (Lawton Williams) – 2:18
10. "Wishing Well" – 3:00
11. "Big Big Love" (Ray Carroll, Wynn Stewart) – 2:49

== Personnel ==
- Nick Lowe – vocals, bass (1, 4–6), acoustic guitars (2, 3, 7, 9, 11), guitars (5), backing vocals (6, 11), electric guitars (9), electric rhythm guitar (10), electric lead guitar (11)
- Paul Carrack – acoustic piano (2, 3, 9, 11), organ (3–7), backing vocals (6, 11)
- Geraint Watkins – keyboards (8)
- Jimmie Vaughan – electric guitars (1)
- Martin Belmont – electric guitars (2, 3, 6, 7), backing vocals (6, 11), acoustic guitar (9), electric rhythm guitar (11)
- John Hiatt – guitars (4)
- Mickey Gee – lead guitar (8)
- Paul "Bassman" Riley – bass (2, 3, 7, 9, 11), backing vocals (11)
- John David – bass (8)
- Bobby Irwin – drums (1, 5), backing vocals (1)
- Terry Williams – drums (2–4, 7–9, 11), backing vocals (11)
- Pete Thomas – drums (6), backing vocals (6)
- Kim Wilson – harmonica (1)

Production

- Nick Lowe – producer (1–7, 9–11)
- Colin Fairley – producer (1–7, 9–11)
- Dave Edmunds – producer (8)
- Stuart Sullivan – engineer (1, 5)
- Dave Anderson – engineer (2–4, 6–11)
- Pete Brown – engineer (2–4, 6–11)
- Julie-Ann Jones – engineer (2–4, 6–11)
- Phil Legg – engineer (2–4, 6–11)
- Mike Pela – engineer (2–4, 6–11)
- Nick Sykes – engineer (2–4, 6–11)
- Dave Charles – engineer (8)
- Michael Krage – design
- Keith Morris – photography
