= Seven Nights to Rock =

"Seven Nights to Rock" is a classic rockabilly song written by Buck Trail, Henry Glover, and Louis Innis. It was originally recorded by Moon Mullican on January 26, 1956, and has been covered by a number of diverse artists.

== History ==
"Seven Nights to Rock" was originally recorded by Moon Mullican on January 26, 1956 with Boyd Bennett and His Rockets providing additional backing instruments. It was released as a single on March 3 of that year by King Records. This release was not commercially successful but was influential and the song went on to be covered by numerous artists. The original Moon Mullican version has appeared on several compilation albums.

=== Covers ===
Nick Lowe recorded the song (with the title altered to "7 Nights to Rock") for his 1985 album The Rose of England; BR5-49 recorded it for their 1998 album Big Backyard Beat Show; a recording by The Refreshments appears on their 2006 compilation album It's Gotta be Both Rock 'n' Roll; and The Connection released it as the feature song of an EP Seven Nights to Rock in 2012, and shortly afterwards it was named "Coolest Song In The World" by Steven Van Zandt at his SiriusXM radio station, Little Steven's Underground Garage. A live recording of "Seven Nights to Rock" is the closing track to Brian Setzer's album Rockabilly Riot! Live from the Planet. Both Bruce Springsteen and Bryan Adams have used the song as a staple at live performances, as have The Searchers.
