= Norman Bergen =

American musician (born 1945)

- Born: Norman Bergen; May 17, 1945 (age 80); Brooklyn, New York, United States
- Genres: Pop, Disco, Jazz, Soul
- Occupations: Pianist, arranger, record producer, musical director, vocalist
- Instruments: Piano, keyboards, vocals
- Years active: 1957–present

Norman Bergen (born 17 May 1945) is an American pianist, arranger, record producer, band leader, musical director, and vocalist. He is known for his work in Broadway productions, hit pop recordings, and disco productions of the 1970s. He co-wrote the standard "Only A Fool Breaks His Own Heart", which has seen international success with more than 60 cover versions.

== Biography ==
=== Early years ===
Norman Bergen comes from a musical family. He is the younger son of Pauline and Sam Bergen. The largest item in their small apartment was a baby grand piano which was played by his mother Pauline. His older brother Danny played trumpet. Norman started playing piano at the age of three. Bergen's early influences were the pianists played by New York DJs Alan Freed and Symphony Sid: Ray Charles, Fats Domino, Little Richard, Jerry Lee Lewis, Thelonious Monk, Ramsey Lewis, and Dave Brubeck.

=== Catskill Mountains ===
Bergen went on to perform in New York's Catskill Mountains sitting in with his brother's band in 1957. He was a band leader and pianist at the early age of 14. In that same year, 1959, he also appeared on the Jerry Lewis Labor Day Telethon with his own band. During his years in the Catskills, from 1959 until the mid-1960s, Bergen backed up many stars including Cab Calloway, Rodney Dangerfield, Jackie Mason, Dick Shawn, and jazz musician Joe Williams.

=== Brooklyn to the Brill Building ===
While still in high school, Bergen would take the subway train to Manhattan after school to play his demos for companies in the Brill Building. During this period, at age 17, he toured with Neil Sedaka, playing piano and guitar. Bergen also met two well-known Brooklyn singing groups: Vito & the Salutations with whom he performed as a member for two years as well as writing songs and arrangements for their recordings, and The Tokens. Bergen's musical arrangements for The Tokens' Bright Tunes Productions include records by The Chiffons, The Happenings, the Tokens themselves, and the first two hits by Tony Orlando and Dawn: “Candida” and multi-million seller “Knock Three Times”. Bergen later re-joined forces with Tokens founding members Phil and Mitch Margo along with Dennis Marcellino, to form a “west coast Tokens”, touring the U.S. from 1985 to 1993 during which time they recorded two albums: “Re-Doo-Wopp” (RCA) and “Oldies Are Now” (BT Puppy). It was during those years that the group appeared in the acclaimed sketch “City Of Strangers” on “The Tracey Ullman Show”.

=== College education ===
Bergen earned degrees from Manhattan School of Music – Bachelor's in Music Theory in 1966 and Master's in Music Education in 1967. It was during his years at this school that he had the honor of playing piano under conductor Leopold Stokowski (at Carnegie Hall)with the American Symphony Orchestra, a television program at WGBH Boston with composer Aaron Copland, and recording the music of composer Lou Harrison with the Manhattan Percussion Ensemble. Bergen performed with the ensemble on the original 1965 recording of Julia Perry's Homunculus C.F., a piece for harp, celeste/piano, and eight percussionists.

== Musical career ==
=== "Only A Fool Breaks His Own Heart" ===
In 1964, Bergen co-wrote the song "Only A Fool Breaks His Own Heart" with Shelly Coburn for United Artists Music. It has had quite a history since its first recording by Arthur Prysock. There are now more than 60 versions including Tom Jones, Wyclef Jean, Nick Lowe on "The Convincer" CD, Dion DiMucci, Long John Baldry, and calypso king Mighty Sparrow. The song has attained huge success in various parts of the world including Holland where it was on the top 100 for 28 weeks and came in at No. 3 of the 70s decade. It has become a true standard in Finland as “Muisto vain jää”, with hit versions by Jouko and Kosti, Pekka Tiilikainen and Beatmakers, and Harri Marstio. Bergen is currently composing material for Marstio's next album. The song has also been translated to German, Swedish, and Dutch.

=== Musical direction ===
Bergen's Broadway and off-Broadway show credits include Oh! Calcutta! (where he holds the record of conducting over 3000 performances on Broadway), “Let My People Come”, and “What’s A Nice Country (Doing In A State Like This?)”. He has also conducted orchestras for Debbie Reynolds, Robert Guillaume, and Juliet Prowse. Bergen was musical director for the PBS fund-raiser “Let’s Rock Tonight Concert” which featured original recording artists of the 50s and 60s including Fabian, Ben E. King, Del Shannon, Mitch Ryder, Martha & The Vandellas, and Mary Wells. He spent many years in the 80s and 90s as musical director for Tony Orlando, including a 5-year run at Branson’s Yellow Ribbon Music Theatre. He also was musical director and did vocal arrangements on the 1976 musical Let My People Come.

=== Disco ===
Bergen and associate Reid Whitelaw wrote and produced some of the most memorable disco records of the 70s with artists Gloria Gaynor "Love Is Just a Heartbeat Away", Ralph Carter of TV's Good Times, Vicki Sue Robinson, and singing group Moment of Truth, whose recording of “So Much For Love” would become the first twelve-inch 45, as created by Tom Moulton.

=== Other performers ===
Bergen has arranged music and/or produced recordings for a varied range of singers including Astrud Gilberto "Come Softly to Me/Hushabye" on Astrud Gilberto's Finest Hour, Trini Lopez, Danny Bonaduce, Diane Keaton, and Tiny Tim.

== Recent years ==
Many of Bergen's songs and productions have resurfaced largely through the efforts of former fellow co-writer/producer Reid Whitelaw, with track samples by such artists as Snoop Dogg, the song "Friends" on his 2001 Gold Album "Duces 'n Trayz: The Old Fashioned Way", and German duo Milk & Sugar, on their hits "Stay Around(For This)" and "Has Your Man Got Soul". Bergen was the musical director for Tony Orlando at the Yellow Ribbon Music Theater and has also been active on U.S. riverboats including the Mississippi Queen, American Queen, and Empress of the North, where he performed as band leader and musical director for the Delta Queen Steamboat Company. and Majestic America Line.

In 2025, Bergen became musical director for Peter Lemongello Jr., touring with him throughout New York and Florida.

== Symphony of Love ==
His latest album, his first as featured performer, is Symphony of Love. It contains 13 tracks including Bergen's own rendition of "Only A Fool Breaks His Own Heart", plus 11 new originals. Personnel include Nick Lowe, Anna Harvey, Geraint Watkins (keyboards), Zev Katz (bass), and Van Morrison alumni Johnny Scott (guitar) and Robert Treherne (drums), who co-produced the album with Neil Brockbank at Goldtop Studios in London.

== See also ==
- List of music arrangers
