= Cruel to Be Kind =

- Cover of the 1979 UK single

Single by Nick Lowe

from the album Labour of Lust
- B-side: "Endless Grey Ribbon"
- Released: 17 August 1979 (UK)
- Genre: Power pop; pop-soul
- Length: 3:31
- Label: Radar (UK); Columbia (US)
- Songwriters: Nick Lowe; Ian Gomm
- Producer: Lowe

Nick Lowe singles chronology
"Cracking Up" (1979)	"Cruel to Be Kind" (1979)	"Switch Board Susan" (1979)

Official video
- "Cruel to Be Kind" on YouTube

"Cruel to Be Kind" is a song co-written by Nick Lowe and his former bandmate Ian Gomm while the pair were in Brinsley Schwarz. The song only appeared as the 1978 B-side of Lowe's "Little Hitler" single until Columbia Records convinced him to rerecord it as a potential single for his 1979 album Labour of Lust. Musically, the song was inspired by "The Love I Lost" by Harold Melvin & the Blue Notes, an influence reflected in more recent performances of the song. The title comes from a quote from Hamlet, which reads "I must be cruel only to be kind."

Released as a single in 1979, the song peaked at number 12 on the charts of Australia, Canada, the UK and the US. In the US, where it is one of Lowe's most well-known works, it remains his only single to hit the top 40 of the Billboard Hot 100, whereas in the UK "I Love the Sound of Breaking Glass" remains his biggest hit, having reached number 7 on the UK singles chart a year earlier. The song was accompanied by a music video featuring Lowe's marriage to Carlene Carter.

== Background ==
"Cruel to Be Kind" was originally written by Nick Lowe and Ian Gomm while in Brinsley Schwarz, having been recorded as a demo during the band's final years. The song was to appear on It's All Over Now, which was intended to be the band's final studio album but was not released at the time; this version of "Cruel to Be Kind" ultimately did not surface until 1978, when it appeared as a B-side of Lowe's single "Little Hitler". Lowe stated, "I wrote that when I was with a band, Brinsley Schwarz, that I was with from the early '70s to about the mid-'70s. ... We recorded it on a demo, it never came out, and when I signed to Columbia Records the A&R man [Gregg Geller] there at the time suggested I record it again. And I didn't think it would do anything, but he kind of bullied me into it." Lowe recorded the song with his band Rockpile; he recalled, "I said, 'Boys, I'm sorry, I've got this song which I've been told we've got to record, and it goes like this.' They grumbled a bit about it."

Musically, the song was originally closer to a soul style. Lowe later said, “Initially... the inspiration was a song I loved by Harold Melvin & the Blue Notes called, 'The Love I Lost', and the bass line was the same... we loved that Philly disco stuff from the '70s, The O'Jays, all that stuff, we loved that... I can't really remember much about recording it. It was just another tune that we did, you know, and I sent it over to New York to Gregg and said, Uhh, will this do?'" In more recent live versions, Lowe has performed the song closer to "The Love I Lost"; he explained, "How I do it now sounds quite different. In fact, it was on the radio the other day and I was quite amazed how differently I do it now".

"Cruel to Be Kind" proved to be Lowe's most successful American single. Lowe reflected on this, "When I had my couple of hits, I sort of felt like I was ticking a box more than, 'Great, I'm off now on a chart-topping career.' I felt that in order to do what I wanted to do, I had to do certain things, and one of them was to have a hit in my own right. At least one. I managed two or three, if you take in Europe. But in the United States, where it really matters, I had one hit and people still remember it, and it's a pretty good little song, you know?" Lowe continues to perform the song live and still looks favorably upon the song, saying, "I really love it. It cheers people up. ... If they're good songs, they really will stand the test of time".

Meanwhile, Gomm would have his own lone hit in America the same year with "Hold On", which peaked at number 18 on the Billboard Hot 100.

== Release history ==
The song was originally written and recorded for the final Brinsley Schwarz album, It’s All Over Now, which was not released at the time.

This version was eventually issued as the non-album B-side of Lowe's "Little Hitler" single, culled from his first solo album in 1978, Jesus of Cool (retitled Pure Pop for Now People in the US). This is now known as the "original version", as compiled on Lowe's 1999 box set The Doings: The Solo Years and the 2008 expanded reissue of Jesus of Cool, as well as Mega Dodo Records' release It's All Over Now, based on the unreleased album of the same title.

The song was then re-recorded with Rockpile and appeared on Lowe's second album Labour of Lust in 1979. It was released as a single on the Radar Records label in the UK and Columbia Records in the United States, charting at number 12 on both the UK singles chart and the US Billboard Hot 100. The cover art was done by Antoinette Laumer Sales, while the cover photograph of Nick Lowe was by Greg Irvine.

The single was backed with the non-album Lowe solo song "Endless Grey Ribbon", which Lowe had originally composed for fellow Rockpile member Dave Edmunds, as referred to in the ITV documentary Born Fighters. Lowe included the Labour of Lust version of the song on both the 1984 12" single of "Half a Boy and Half a Man", from his album Nick Lowe and His Cowboy Outfit, as well as the EP version of his single "All Men Are Liars", from 1990's Party of One. It also appears on the 2010 soundtrack album of the 2006 motion picture The Ant Bully. Live versions of the song appear on Lowe's 1998 single "You Inspire Me", from his Dig My Mood album, and on the 2004 live album Untouched Takeaway.

The Labour of Lust version of "Cruel to Be Kind" has been included on many compilations of Nick Lowe's work, including 1985's 16 All Time Lowes, 1990's Basher: The Best of Nick Lowe, 1999's The Doings: The Solo Years, 2002's Anthology and 2009's Quiet Please... The New Best of Nick Lowe. It has also been included on many various artists compilations of hits of the 1970s, such as Poptopia! 70's Power Pop Classics.

== Music video ==
The video for "Cruel to be Kind" was the 67th video to air on MTV and is a combination of actual footage of Lowe's wedding to Carlene Carter, with a humorous re-enactment of the wedding, featuring Carter as herself, Dave Edmunds as their limo driver, Terry Williams as the photographer, Billy Bremner as the baker, and Jake Riviera (Lowe's manager at the time) as the best man. The wedding took place on August 18, 1979, at the Tropicana Motel in West Hollywood. All family stayed there for the wedding and reception (also featured in the video). Filming for the video took so long that Lowe was actually late to the wedding.

== Chart performance ==
=== Weekly charts ===
Chart (1979)	Peak position
Australia (Kent Music Report)	12
Canada RPM Top Singles	12
Ireland (IRMA)	19
New Zealand (Recorded Music NZ)	34
UK Singles (Official Charts)	12
U.S. Billboard Hot 100	12
U.S. Cash Box Top 100	12

=== Year-end charts ===
Chart (1979)	Rank
Australia (Kent Music Report)	86
Canada	90
U.S. (Joel Whitburn's Pop Annual)	87
U.S. Cash Box	93

== See also ==
- List of 1970s one-hit wonders in the United States
