= The Beast in Me =

The Beast in Me may refer to:

- "The Beast in Me" (song), written and performed by Nick Lowe and also covered by Johnny Cash
- The Beast in Me (TV series), a 2025 psychological thriller miniseries set on Long Island
- Beast (2026 film), a mixed-martial arts sports drama with the working title The Beast in Me
