= At My Age =

Studio album by Nick Lowe
- Released: 26 June 2007
- Studio: Goldtop Studio (Chalk Farm, London, UK); RAK Studios and St John's Wood (London, UK)
- Genre: Rock
- Length: 33:07
- Label: Proper (UK); Yep Roc (US)
- Producer: Nick Lowe; Neil Brockbank

Nick Lowe chronology
Untouched Takeaway (2004)	At My Age (2007)	Quiet Please... The New Best of Nick Lowe (2008)

Professional ratings
Aggregate scores
Source	Rating
Metacritic	82/100
Review scores
Source	Rating
AllMusic	4/5 stars
The A.V. Club	A−
Entertainment Weekly	A−
Now	3/5 stars
The Observer	4/5 stars
Pitchfork	7.2/10
Record Collector	5/5 stars
Rolling Stone	3.5/5 stars
Spin	8/10
Uncut	4/5 stars

At My Age is an album by Nick Lowe released in June 2007 by Proper Records. It was recorded in London and produced by Nick Lowe and Neil Brockbank.

== Track listing ==
All tracks composed by Nick Lowe except where noted.

1. "A Better Man" – 2:16
2. "Long Limbed Girl" – 2:52
3. "I Trained Her to Love Me" (Lowe, Robert Treherne) – 2:59
4. "The Club" – 2:36
5. "Hope for Us All" – 3:42
6. "People Change" – 2:55
7. "The Man in Love" (Charlie Feathers, Quinton Claunch, William Cantrell) – 2:08
8. "Love's Got a Lot to Answer For" – 3:02
9. "Rome Wasn't Built in a Day" – 2:42
10. "Not Too Long Ago" (Joe Stampley, Merle Kilgore) – 2:20
11. "The Other Side of the Coin" – 2:47
12. "Feel Again" (Faron Young) – 2:48

== Personnel ==
=== Musicians ===
- Nick Lowe – lead vocals, rhythm guitars, electric bass
- Geraint Watkins – acoustic piano, organ
- Steve Donnelly – lead guitars
- Matt Radford – double bass
- Robert Treherne – drums, backing vocals
- Martin Winning – tenor saxophone, clarinet
- Matt Holland – trumpet, flugelhorn, acoustic piano solo (6)

With:

- Neil Brockbank – Vox organ (4, 6)
- Bill Kirchen – 6-string bass (4)
- Nick Payn – baritone saxophone (9, 10)
- Chris Barber – trombone (11)
- Bob Loveday – viola (6, 9, 12), violin (6, 9, 12)
- Linnea Svensson – backing vocals (5)
- Chrissie Hynde – backing vocals (6)
- Anna Harvey – backing vocals (12)

=== Production ===
- Nick Lowe – producer
- Neil Brockbank – producer
- Helen Atkinson – studio assistant
- Kenny Paterson – studio assistant
- Sterling Roswell – studio assistant
- Phil Hankinson – cover illustration
- Peta Waddington – design
- Dan Burn-Forti – photography

== Charts ==
Sweden-10
