= Milk and Alcohol =

Single by Dr. Feelgood

Single by Dr. Feelgood

from the album Private Practice
- B-side: "Every Kind of Vice"
- Released: January 1979
- Recorded: 1978
- Genre: Rock and roll, pub rock
- Length: 2:55
- Label: United Artists Records – UP 36468
- Songwriter: Nick Lowe/Gypie Mayo
- Producer: Richard Gottehrer

Dr. Feelgood singles chronology
"Down at the Doctors" (1978)	"Milk and Alcohol" (1979)	"As Long As The Price is Right" (1979)

Official audio
- "Milk and Alcohol" on YouTube

"Milk and Alcohol" is a song by the band Dr. Feelgood that reached number nine in the UK Singles Chart in 1979. Written by Nick Lowe and Gypie Mayo, and produced by Richard Gottehrer, the song was Dr. Feelgood's biggest hit and continues to be played by the band.

== History ==
"Milk and Alcohol", written in 1978 by Nick Lowe and John "Gypie" Mayo, reportedly retells Lowe's 1970s experiences drinking one too many Kahlúa-milk drinks at or after a United States concert by bluesman John Lee Hooker. However, while the song anonymously criticises Hooker ("Main attraction dead on his feet, Black man rhythm with a white boy beat"), ironically it was inspired by Hooker's own lyric about "milk, cream and alcohol". The song was recorded in 1978 and first appeared on Private Practice, an album by Dr. Feelgood that was released in October 1978. The heavy riffs on "Milk and Alcohol" were added by Mayo, a guitarist who replaced Wilko Johnson in 1978, after Johnson left the band as a result of an argument over the recording of Dr. Feelgood's fourth album, Sneakin' Suspicion (1977).

"Milk and Alcohol" was released as a single, on United Artists, in January 1979. The vinyl material of the single record was issued in the three colours of black, white and brown, with the white and brown meant to call to mind white milk and brown alcohol. The outline of a Kahlúa bottle appears on the record sleeve. The background around the bottle on the different record sleeves was varied to match the vinyl colour.

The song reached the Top 10 in the UK Singles Chart in the same month it was released. The track reached number nine in the UK chart, and spent nine weeks in the listing. Capitalising on the notoriety the song brought, the band presented "Milk and Alcohol" live to audiences around the world in 1979, including in Japan, Australia, New Zealand, the Middle East, Russia and the United States.

The song is in the key of C major, and has a tempo of 168. Like many other Dr Feelgood songs, it has a shuffle feel and a short guitar solo after the second chorus.

== Impact ==
"Milk and Alcohol" was the band's fourth hit single in the United Kingdom, and their only top 10 single on the UK Singles Chart. For much of the 1970s, the musical world was perceived as being dominated by "fey glam-rockers and 15-minute Mellotron solos." When "Milk and Alcohol" was played in the pubs of Canvey Island in the late 1970s, the song came across as a radical departure that contributed to "a short, sharp shock of roots rock." For a while, the song led to some drinking both alcohol and milk while listening to Dr. Feelgood perform live.

In April 1989, a re-recorded version titled "Milk and Alcohol (New Recipe)" was issued by EMI in both 7" vinyl ((EM 89) with "She's Got Her Eyes on You" as the B-side); and 12" vinyl ((12 EM 89) with "She's Got Her Eyes on You" and "Mad Man Blues" on the B-side). Both songs were later released on the "Rarities" disc of their Looking Back compilation album.

In 1997, "Milk and Alcohol" continued to be played by the band while making the rounds of the world's pubs, clubs and concert halls. However, by 2003, "Milk and Alcohol" was seen as a "forgotten gem". With the band continuing to present the song in concerts, the music community regained respect for the song. In 2005, the band's biggest hit was being called a "classic." In that same year, "Milk and Alcohol" was considered by the music magazine Q in its compilation of the top ten cigarettes and alcohol songs for the ultimate soundtrack to a drinking session, but lost out to the 1987 song "Nightrain" by the American rock band, Guns N' Roses. Mayo's guitar performance on "Milk and Alcohol", which ranked as number four on a 2005 list of the top ten great British guitar heroes, was cited in that same listing for waking "a generation of guitarists up to the sheer power and energy" of the guitar.

More than four decades after reaching the UK's top ten, "Milk and Alcohol" continues to be a popular choice for the band during its concerts.
