= Dig My Mood =

Studio album by Nick Lowe
- Released: 26 January 1998
- Recorded: June 1996 – June 1997
- Studio: RAK, St. John's Wood, September Sound, The Bonaparte Rooms and RG Jones (London, UK)
- Genre: Rock and roll
- Length: 36:58
- Label: Demon/Upstart
- Producer: Neil Brockbank; Nick Lowe

Nick Lowe chronology
The Impossible Bird (1994)	Dig My Mood (1998)	The Convincer (2001)

Dig My Mood is an album by the British singer-songwriter Nick Lowe. Produced by Lowe and Neil Brockbank, it was released in the UK in 1998 by Demon Records and elsewhere by Upstart Records.

== Critical reception ==
Professional ratings
Review scores
Source	Rating
AllMusic	4/5 stars
Robert Christgau	(choice cut)
The Encyclopedia of Popular Music	4/5 stars
Rolling Stone	3/5 stars
Uncut	5/5 stars

AllMusic wrote that Lowe's songs "are quietly ambitious, exploring new territory lyrically and musically, without leaving his signature style". No Depression wrote that Dig My Mood "resonates with a relaxed, after-hours vibe". The A.V. Club called the album "evidence that the flame that drives Lowe hasn't so much dimmed as intensified into a deeper blue". The Hartford Courant wrote that "the studio musicians are almost irrelevant on this release, given the strength of Lowe's vocals and the magnetic attraction of his songs".

== Track listing ==
All songs written by Nick Lowe except where noted.

1. "Faithless Lover" – 2:44
2. "Lonesome Reverie" – 2:52
3. "You Inspire Me" – 3:09
4. "What Lack of Love Has Done" – 2:48
5. "Time I Took a Holiday" – 3:29
6. "Failed Christian" (Henry McCullough) – 3:53
7. "Man That I've Become" – 2:52
8. "Freezing" – 3:56
9. "High on a Hilltop" – 3:03
10. "Lead Me Not" – 2:58
11. "I Must Be Getting Over You" – 2:19
12. "Cold Grey Light of Dawn" (Ivory Joe Hunter) – 2:55

== Personnel ==
- Nick Lowe – vocals, rhythm guitars, bass guitar
- Geraint Watkins – acoustic piano, organ, accordion, electric guitars
- Steve Donnelly – lead guitars
- Robert Treherne – drums
- Nick Pentelow – tenor saxophone
- Richard Bissill – violin arrangements and conductor (12)

Production

- Nick Lowe – producer
- Neil Brockbank – producer, mixing
- Valerie Boyd – photographic art direction
- Joern Kroeger – cover design
- Eleanor Bentall – photography
