= Nick the Knife =

Studio album by Nick Lowe
- Released: 12 February 1982
- Studio: Eden Studios (Acton, London)
- Genre: Rock
- Length: 34:11
- Label: F-Beat (UK), Columbia (US)
- Producer: Nick Lowe

Nick Lowe chronology
Labour of Lust (1979)	Nick the Knife (1982)	The Abominable Showman (1983)

Singles from Nick the Knife
- 1. "Stick It Where the Sun Don't Shine / My Heart Hurts" Released: 1982; 2. "Burning / Zulu Kiss" Released: 1982; 3. "My Heart Hurts / Pet You and Hold You (Live)" Released: 1982

Nick the Knife is the third solo album by Nick Lowe, released in 1982 and his first since the 1981 breakup of his band Rockpile.

== Background ==
The record still has several ties to Rockpile with Lowe's former bandmates Billy Bremner and Terry Williams both playing on the album. The album includes Lowe's slower remake of the Rockpile song "Heart"; the original version can be found on the band's album Seconds of Pleasure, sung by Bremner.

Nick the Knife reached #50 on the Billboard 200, and #99 on the UK album charts. No singles from the album made the US or UK charts, although in Canada "Stick It Where The Sun Don't Shine" hit the top 40.

Nick the Knife is notable for being one of only two Lowe solo albums with no cover versions, including only songs written or co-written by Lowe, the other album being his 1990 Party of One.

A 1990 CD of the album was issued on Demon Records with the catalog number FIEND CD 183.

The album was reissued by Yep Roc Records in 2017.

== Critical reception ==
Professional ratings
Review scores
Source	Rating
AllMusic	3/5 stars
Robert Christgau	B+
Rolling Stone	4/5 stars

Writing in The Boston Phoenix, Joyce Millman felt that "Lowe sounds uncharacteristically somber here, as if he'd just lost his best friend. Which he has — this is his first album without long-time pal Dave Edmunds. ... Whereas Lowe once sang his love songs from the safety of the pack, on Nick the Knife he sets himself apart from the other men and addresses the woman as a partner — and not merely a sexual one."

== Track listing ==
All tracks composed by Nick Lowe except where noted.

1. "Burning" – 2:07
2. "Heart" (Lowe, Rockpile) – 3:41
3. "Stick It Where the Sun Don't Shine" – 3:42
4. "Queen of Sheba" – 2:30
5. "My Heart Hurts" (Lowe, Carlene Carter) – 2:39
6. "Couldn't Love You (Any More Than I Do)" – 2:36
7. "Let Me Kiss Ya" – 2:56
8. "Too Many Teardrops" (Lowe, Carter) – 2:33
9. "Ba Doom" – 2:19
10. "Raining Raining" – 2:45
11. "One's Too Many (And a Hundred Ain't Enough)" (Lowe, Kim Wilson) – 2:37
12. "Zulu Kiss" (Lowe, J.E. Ceiling) – 3:22

Bonus tracks from 2017 YepRoc reissue:

13. "Heart (Demo)" – 3:53
14. "Raining Raining (Demo)" – 1:55
15. "I Got a Job" – 3:01

== Personnel ==
- Nick Lowe – vocals, backing vocals, guitars, bass
- Ben Barson – acoustic piano, Hammond organ
- Paul Carrack – acoustic piano, Hammond organ
- Carlene Carter – acoustic piano, Hammond organ
- Neill King – acoustic piano, Hammond organ
- Steve Nieve – acoustic piano, Hammond organ
- Martin Belmont – guitars
- Billy Bremner – guitars
- Aldo Bocca – guitars, drums (2)
- James Eller – more bass
- Bobby Irwin – drums, backing vocals
- Terry Williams – drums

Production

- Nick Lowe – producer, recording, honing
- Aldo Bocca – engineer
- Neill King – audio grip

== Singles ==
Three songs from the album were released as singles:

- "Stick it Where the Sun Don’t Shine" b/w "My Heart Hurts"
- "Burning" b/w "Zulu Kiss"
- "My Heart Hurts" - released in four versions:
1. promo b/w same
2. b/w "Stick it Where the Sun Don’t Shine"
3. double 45 with three live songs "Pet You and Hold You", "Cracking Up" and "(What’s So Funny ’bout) Peace, Love and Understanding"
4. b/w "Pet You and Hold You" (Live)

Live versions recorded by Nick Lowe and His Noise To Go, February 10, 1982 at the Agora Ballroom, Cleveland, Ohio

== Cover version ==
In 2015, Justin Remer of Elastic No-No Band recorded covers of all 12 tracks on Nick the Knife with his side project Duck the Piano Wire and released it as the album Duck the Knife: A Homemade Remake of Nick Lowe's "Nick the Knife."
