= Julia Perry =

American classical composer

- Born: March 25, 1924; Lexington, KY
- Died: April 24, 1979 (aged 55); Akron, OH
- Education: Westminster Choir College, Juilliard School of Music,
- Occupations: Composer, pianist, conductor

Julia Amanda Perry (March 25, 1924 – April 24, 1979) was an American classical composer and teacher who combined European classical and neo-classical training with her African-American heritage.

== Life and education ==
Born in Lexington, Kentucky, on March 25, 1924, Julia Perry moved with her family while still a child to Akron, Ohio. She studied voice, piano, and composition at Westminster Choir College from 1943 to 1948, earning her bachelor's and master's degrees in music. For her thesis she wrote a secular cantata titled Chicago. She continued her graduate studies at the Berkshire Music Center in Tanglewood, where she was a student of Luigi Dallapiccola, and then studied at the Juilliard School of Music. She was awarded her first Guggenheim Fellowship in music composition in 1954.

In 1952, Perry began studying under Nadia Boulanger in Paris and was awarded the Boulanger Grand Prix for her Viola Sonata. She was awarded her second Guggenheim Fellowship in 1956, which she used to continue her studies with Dallapiccola in Italy.

Perry also studied conducting at the Accademia Chigiana in Siena during the summers of 1956 and 1957, and in 1957 was sponsored by the U.S. Information Service to conduct a series of concerts in Europe.

After five and a half years in Europe, Perry returned to the US and continued her work in composition. She took up teaching at Tallahassee's Florida Agricultural and Mechanical College in 1967 and was also a visiting artist at Atlanta College.

In 1964 her three-act opera-ballet The Selfish Giant, based on Oscar Wilde's fable, won an American Academy of Arts and Letters Prize in music.

Perry suffered a stroke about 1970 and her career began to decline. She died on April 24, 1979, and is buried in Glendale Cemetery in Akron, Ohio; the birth year on her tombstone, 1927, is incorrect.

== Works and compositions ==
Some of Perry's early compositions are heavily influenced by African-American music. In 1951 Free at Last and I'm a Poor Li'l Orphan were published, both of which showcased her incorporation of black spiritual music. She also composed Song of Our Savior for the Hampton Institute Choir, which used Dorian mode and a hummed ostinato with call and response phrases throughout the piece.

In other works, Perry began branching out in her composition technique and experimenting with dissonance. One of her most notable works, Stabat Mater (1951), is composed for solo contralto and string orchestra. It incorporates dissonance, but remains within the classification of tonal music. These pieces incorporate more modern compositional techniques, such as quartal harmony, which voices chords in fourths rather than thirds and fifths. It was recorded on CRI, by the Japan Philharmonic Symphony Orchestra, William Strickland, conducting.

Other instrumental works by Perry include Requiem for Orchestra (also known as Homage to Vivaldi because of themes inspired by composer Antonio Vivaldi), a number of shorter orchestral works; several types of chamber music; a violin concerto; twelve symphonies; and two piano concertos. Her vocal works include a three-act opera and The Symplegades, which was based on the 17th century Salem witchcraft panic. The opera took more than ten years to write and was left incomplete at her death. She also composed an operatic ballet with her own libretto, based on Oscar Wilde's fable The Selfish Giant, and in 1976 composed Five Quixotic Songs for bass baritone and Bicentennial Reflections for tenor solo in 1977.

Perry's early compositions focused mostly on works written for voice, however, she gradually began to write more instrumental compositions later in life. By the time she suffered from a stroke in 1971, she had written twelve symphonies.

Although she is known to have composed dozens of works, many cannot be performed due to questions over copyright.

Select list of compositions.

Title	Date	Instrumentation
Suite of shoes	1947	Piano
Pearls on silk	1947	Piano
Is there anybody there?	1947	Women's voices
Chicago	1948	Cantata for baritone, narrator, chorus & orchestra
Ruth	1950	Cantata for chorus & organ
Stabat Mater	1951	Contralto and strings
Short Piece	1952	Orchestra
Study	1952	Orchestra
Ye who seek the Truth, anthem	1952	Tenor, mixed choir, and organ
The Bottle	1953	Opera
Frammenti dalle Lettere di Santa Caterina	1953	Orchestra and soprano
The Cask of Amontillado	1954	Opera
Requiem (Homage to Vivaldi)	1959	Orchestra
Homunculus C.F.	1960	10 percussion with harp and piano
Pastoral	1962	Flute and string sextet
Three Warnings	1963	Opera
Contretemps	1963	Orchestra
The Selfish Giant	1964	Opera
Piano Concerto	1964	Piano and orchestra
Violin Concerto	1964	Violin and orchestra
Symphony No. 6	1966	Symphonic Band
Symphony U.S.A. No. 7	1967	Choir and small orchestra
Violin Concerto	1968	Orchestra and vocal

== Recordings and performances ==
Perry's works were not widely recorded, but her Short Piece for Orchestra was performed and recorded by the New York Philharmonic in 1965 in Lincoln Center New York.

This piece is representative of Perry's neoclassical compositional style. It has a number of rhythmic elements that use syncopation. The piece itself it somewhat frantic and wild, with the strings and brass sections switching between background and foreground in the composition, and rhythmic fills from the percussion. After the opening, Short Piece settles down into a long, lyrical passage introduced by the woodwinds and expanded upon by the strings.

In 1960, the Manhattan Percussion Ensemble recorded Perry's Homunculus, C.F. for 10 percussionists. The piece is scored for timpani, cymbals, snare drum, bass drum, wood blocks, xylophone, vibraphone, celesta, piano, and harp. Perry termed the work "pantonal" since is it neither in a major or minor key and it uses all available tones. Perry uses the title Homunculus as a symbol for the experimental nature of the piece; the name refers to the test tube creature brought to life by Wagner, a character in Goethe's Faust.

In 2020, Akron Symphony music director Christopher Wilkins began working with Louise Toppin of the African Diaspora Music Project to revive Perry's works. This led to the Akron Symphony performing several of her compositions, releasing recordings, organizing materials for her unpublished works, and working with the Summit County Probate Judge to get copyright issues resolved. The orchestra's Julia Perry Project has produced recordings, articles, an extensive catalogue of her work, and an oral history project.

In November 2023, the New York Philharmonic performed "Stabat Mater" with mezzo-soprano J'Nai Bridges singing the solo. The Julia Perry Centenary Celebration and Festival was scheduled for 13–16 March 2024 in New York. The first ever recording of her 1964 Violin Concerto (performed at the Festival by Curtis Stewart and the Experiential Orchestra) was issued to coincide with the event.

In 2025 Samantha Ege and the Lontano Orchestra released a recording of the Concerto for Piano and Orchestra in Two Uninterrupted Speeds (1969).
