= The Rose of England (album) =

Studio album by Nick Lowe and His Cowboy Outfit
- Released: August 1985
- Recorded: Late 1984 – early 1985
- Studio: Eden Studios (Chiswick, London, UK); Boathouse Studios (Twickenham, UK)
- Genre: Country rock, rock and roll, rockabilly, new wave, power pop
- Label: Columbia
- Producer: Nick Lowe; Colin Fairley; Huey Lewis (track 7)

Nick Lowe and His Cowboy Outfit chronology
Nick Lowe and His Cowboy Outfit (1984)	The Rose of England (1985)	Pinker and Prouder Than Previous (1988)

Alternative cover
- US cover

The Rose of England is an album by British singer-songwriter Nick Lowe, released in 1985. It is the second overall and last album by Lowe's band the Cowboy Outfit, credited as 'Nick Lowe and His Cowboy Outfit'. It contains three cover versions; "7 Nights to Rock" (originally by Moon Mullican), "I Knew the Bride" (originally by Dave Edmunds, but written by Lowe himself) and "Bo Bo Skediddle" (originally by Wayne Walker).

== Reception ==
Professional ratings
Review scores
Source	Rating
AllMusic	4.5/5 stars
Robert Christgau	B+
Rolling Stone	(not rated)

Spin said the album "tries real hard to grab the ears of American music lovers. Another long-playing chapter in the miraculous and obscure career of Nick Lowe. Another step closer to rock stardom, or another brilliant and blind attempt in vain."

== Track listing ==
All songs by Nick Lowe unless otherwise noted.

1. "Darlin' Angel Eyes" – 2:45
2. "She Don't Love Nobody" (John Hiatt) – 3:23
3. "7 Nights to Rock" (Henry Glover, Louis Innis, Buck Trail) – 2:44
4. "Long Walk Back" (instrumental) (Lowe, Martin Belmont, Paul Carrack, Bobby Irwin) – 3:54
5. "The Rose of England" – 3:26
6. "Lucky Dog" – 3:08
7. "I Knew the Bride (When She Used to Rock & Roll)" – 4:26
8. "Indoor Fireworks" (Elvis Costello) – 3:28
9. "(Hope to God) I'm Right" – 2:41
10. "I Can Be the One You Love" – 4:02
11. "Everyone" (Gary Rue, Leslie Ball) – 3:05
12. "Bo Bo Skediddle" (Webb Pierce, Wayne Walker) – 3:03

== Personnel ==
The Cowboy Outfit

- Nick Lowe – vocals, fat-string bass (1–6, 8–11), 6-string bass (1–6, 8–11), guitars (4, 11)
- Paul Carrack – acoustic piano (1–6, 8–11), organ (1–6, 8–11), backing and duet vocals (1–6, 8–11), bass (11)
- Martin Belmont – guitars (1–6, 8–11)
- Bobby Irwin – drums (1–6, 8–11), backing vocals

Guest musicians

- Andrew Bodnar – bass (1–6, 8–11)
- Nick Pentelow – tenor saxophone (4)
- Chris "Boothill" Thompson – banjo (9)

Huey Lewis and the News on "I Knew the Bride (When She Used to Rock 'N' Roll)"

- Huey Lewis – harmonica, backing vocals
- Sean Hopper – keyboards, backing vocals
- Johnny Colla – guitars, saxophone
- Chris Hayes – guitars, backing vocals
- Mario Cipollina – bass
- Bill Gibson – drums, backing vocals

Production

- Nick Lowe – producer (1–6, 8–11)
- Colin Fairley – producer (1–6, 8–11)
- Huey Lewis – producer (7)
- Irene Kelly – engineer
- Tony Phillips – engineer
- Philip Lloyd-Smee – sleeve design
- Nick Knight – photography

== Charts ==
Chart (1985–86)	Peak position
Australia (Kent Music Report)	100
The Billboard 200	119
