= Homunculus C.F. =

Composition by Julia Perry

Julia Perry's Homunculus C.F., scored for harp, celesta/piano, and eight additional percussionists, was composed during the summer of 1960 in Akron, Ohio, and completed in 1961. It was during this time that Perry was living in an apartment above her father's medical office. In Perry's record liner notes, she stated, "Having selected percussion instruments for my formulae, then maneuvering and distilling them by means of the 'Chord of the Fifteenth' (C.F.), this musical test tube baby was brought to life."

== Instrumentation ==
The piece is scored for four timpani, a small and large suspended cymbal, two medium cymbals, snare drum, bass drum, small and large wood blocks, xylophone, celesta/piano, vibraphone, and harp.

== Significance ==
This particular piece was a watershed work for Perry as she focused her attention toward more experimental music. Perry described the piece as "pantonal".

== History ==
According to Perry's notes on the piece, the "clinical surroundings" of her living quarters above her father's medical office reminded her of the scene in part 2 of Goethe's Faust in which Wagner, Faust's apprentice, brings life to Homunculus (Latin for "little man") through alchemy. As in the process of alchemy, Perry's style of composition displays an "unfolding" of material.

== Structure ==
The piece is composed in four sections around Perry's theme of the "Chord of the Fifteenth", which alternates the use of major and minor thirds beginning on E4, above middle C. The A section (mm. 1–40) is rhythmic in nature, using only unpitched percussion, then leading to a transition (mm. 41–60) that adds three pitches (D♯, G♯, and F♯) through the timpani; the B section is melodic in nature, using duets between the timpani, harp, and celesta/piano (mm. 61–94). Harmony is the theme for the C section (mm. 95–105), featuring an increasingly dense texture while presenting the first four pitches in the chord only; and the fourth and final section combines each element of harmony, melody, and rhythm in a recapitulation, while introducing the remaining pitches of the chord upon which the work is based (A♯, C♯, and E♯). The final phrase (mm. 171–180) builds to the climax that includes all ten performers and all eight pitches in m. 177, signifying the "creation" of Homunculus.

Chord of the Fifteenth

Perry's "Chord of the Fifteenth" is a structural chord built on E and consists of a major third, a perfect fifth, a major seventh (with a minor seventh appearing frequently in one section), a major ninth, an augmented eleventh, a major thirteenth, and an augmented fifteenth.

== Recordings and performances ==
Homunculus C.F. was recorded by the Manhattan Percussion Ensemble (1960), conducted by Paul Price. Norman Bergen performed the celesta part on the original recording with the Manhattan Percussion Ensemble, dated January 28, 1965 at Steinway Hall. Bergen stated in a 2014 interview that Perry did attend the recording session. He remembered her as, "a tall, thin woman with short hair; very nice! She made me feel comfortable and knew how to speak to young musicians so we would not be intimidated."

Homunculus C.F. was recorded by the Manhattan Percussion Ensemble on January 28, 1965, at Steinway Hall, 57th Street, conducted by Paul Price.
