= Be Seeing You =

Studio album by Dr. Feelgood
- Released: 1977
- Recorded: 1977
- Genres: Rhythm and blues, rock and roll, pub rock
- Length: 30:56
- Label: United Artists - UAS 30123
- Producer: Nick Lowe

Dr. Feelgood chronology
Sneakin' Suspicion (1977)	Be Seeing You (1977)	Private Practice (1978)

Professional ratings
Review scores
Source	Rating
AllMusic	4.0/5 stars

Be Seeing You was the fifth album by Dr. Feelgood, released in October 1977. After the departure of Wilko Johnson, this was Dr. Feelgood's first album with guitarist Gypie Mayo.

The album reached number 55 in the UK Albums Chart in October 1977, and remained in that chart for only three weeks. It spawned their second single to enter the corresponding UK Singles Chart - "She's A Wind Up".

The album's title was a catchphrase, used by the band, taken from the cult TV series, The Prisoner, which was enjoying a revival at the time. This theme continued on the album sleeve with the line "produced by Number 2 for Number 6", and included photos of the band in piped blazers and scarves, similar to those used in the series, and some "penny farthing" badges, although the album's front cover was photographed in the band's local pub, the Admiral Jellicoe.

== Track listing ==
1. "Ninety-Nine and a Half (Won't Do)" (Steve Cropper, Eddie Floyd, Wilson Pickett) – 3:08
2. "She's a Wind Up" (Lee Brilleaux, John Martin, John Mayo, John B. Sparks) – 2:01
3. "I Thought I Had It Made" (Lee Brilleaux, John Mayo) – 2:16
4. "I Don't Want to Know" (Lee Brilleaux, John Mayo) – 2:42
5. "That's It, I Quit" (Nick Lowe) – 2:35
6. "As Long as the Price Is Right" (Larry Wallis) – 3:09)
7. "Hi-Rise" (John Mayo) – 2:37
8. "My Buddy Buddy Friends" (Aaron Corthon) – 2:45
9. "Baby Jane" (John Bishop, Harry Nesbitt, Bernard Reed, Lee Simmons, Jerry Wilson) – 2:58
10. "The Blues Had a Baby, and They Named It Rock & Roll (#2)" (Brownie McGhee, McKinley Morganfield) – 2:20
11. "Looking Back" (Johnny "Guitar" Watson) – 2:00
12. "60 Minutes of Your Love" (Isaac Hayes, David Porter) – 2:25

== Personnel ==
Dr. Feelgood

- Lee Brilleaux - vocals, guitar, harmonica
- John B. Sparks - bass guitar, backing vocals
- Gypie Mayo - guitar
- The Big Figure (John Martin) - drums, backing vocals

Technical

- Paul Carrack - keyboards
- Nick Lowe - producer
- Paul Henry - cover design
- Keith Morris - photography
