= Indoor Safari =

Studio album by Nick Lowe
- Released: September 13, 2024
- Genre: Rock and roll, Americana
- Label: Yep Roc
- Producer: Nick Lowe, Alex Hall

Indoor Safari is an album by British singer-songwriter Nick Lowe. It is his first full-length album with Los Straitjackets. It was released on Yep Roc Records on September 13, 2024.

Many of the songs on the album had been included on three EPs released with Los Straitjackets from 2018 to 2020, but Lowe said he wasn’t happy with the quality of those recordings. “When it was suggested we put these records out on an LP, I said, ‘Well, we’ve got to revisit. We’ve got to either re-record some of these songs or revisit the original recordings and make them sound like something. They definitely need new vocals and other bits and pieces, just to make them sound like they do now.’”

The album was recorded at Reliable Recorders in Chicago, with Alex Hall producing.

== Reception ==
Rolling Stone wrote "the venerated 75-year-old rock & roll sophisticate is back on his game with Indoor Safari. It's an album of clever, lovingly crafted tunes steeped in Fifties rockabilly and the early-Sixties British Invasion greats." AllMusic wrote "it's a cheerful, fun, sweet – and melancholy at times – record that consolidates and validates the revival of Lowe the rocker and for that, his fans should rejoice."

== Track listing ==
All tracks are written by All tracks composed by Nick Lowe except where noted.

No.	Title	Writer(s)	Length
1.	"Went to a Party"	(N Lowe, E Angel, P Curry, C Sprague, G Townson)	2:58
2.	"Love Starvation"		2:51
3.	"Crying Inside"		2:55
4.	"A Quiet Place"	(S Bell & N Meade)	3:12
5.	"Blue on Blue"		3:38
6.	"Jet Pac Boomerang"		3:14
7.	"Tokyo Bay"		2:23
8.	"Trombone"		4:07
9.	"Different Kind of Blue"		3:33
10.	"Raincoat in the River"	(A Schroeder, C Kaye)	2:58
11.	"Lay It on Me Baby"		2:55
12.	"Don’t Be Nice to Me"		2:56

== Personnel ==
- Nick Lowe – vocal, acoustic guitar
- Eddie Angel – guitar, vocal
- Pete Curry – bass
- Chris Sprague – drums, vocal
- Greg Townson – guitar

with:

- Gabrielle Sutton – vocal on 4

and:

- Alex Hall & Nick Lowe - mixing
- J.J. Golden - mastering
- Peta Waddington - design
- Eli Attie - liner notes
