= The Impossible Bird =

Studio album by Nick Lowe
- Released: 29 November 1994
- Studios: The Turk's Head Function Room (Winchester Hall), St. Margarets, Twickenham, Middlesex; The Old Cinema (Broadvale Centre), Brentford, Middlesex; The Bonaparte Rooms, St. Margaret's, Twickenham, Middlesex; Mixed at The Town House and RAK Studios (London, UK)
- Genre: Country rock
- Length: 40:12
- Labels: Demon; Upstart
- Producers: Nick Lowe; Neil Brockbank

Nick Lowe chronology
| Party of One (1990) | The Impossible Bird (1994) | Dig My Mood (1998) |

The Impossible Bird is an album by British singer-songwriter Nick Lowe. Produced by Lowe and Neil Brockbank, it was released in the United Kingdom in 1994 on Demon Records and elsewhere by Upstart Records.

== Recording ==
Recording took place at less conventional spaces, such as The Turk's Head Function Room, in an effort to have a good atmosphere for the band. Lowe said, "In order to achieve the intimate thing, it was very important for me to cut the vocal at the same time with the track. So I looked for really comfortable [recording] places. I also used musicians who know how to play within the song."

== Reception ==
Professional ratings
Review scores
| Source | Rating |
|---|---|
| AllMusic | 5/5 stars |
| Chicago Tribune | 3.5/4 stars |
| Entertainment Weekly | B |
| The Guardian | 2/4 stars |
| The Philadelphia Inquirer | 3.5/4 stars |
| Q | 4/5 stars |

In a contemporary review of The Impossible Bird, Rolling Stone critic Paul Evans said that the album showed Lowe "in excellent form" with songs that "demonstrate a prodigious productivity and an emotional realism that ranges from heartbreak... to a well-earned bittersweet humor". People called it a "high point" for Lowe, while Los Angeles Times critic Mike Boehm wrote: "The only real impossibility on this album lies in trying to resist the gently seductive pop charms of the crafty old bird who made it." Less receptive was Robert Christgau of The Village Voice, who merely gave the album a "neither" rating.

== Track listing ==
All tracks are written by Nick Lowe, unless otherwise noted.

| No. | Title | Writer(s) | Length |
|---|---|---|---|
| 1. | "Soulful Wind" | | 3:01 |
| 2. | "The Beast in Me" | | 2:27 |
| 3. | "True Love Travels on a Gravel Road" | Dallas Frazier; A.L. Owens | 3:35 |
| 4. | "Trail of Tears" | Roger Cook; Allen Reynolds | 3:25 |
| 5. | "Shelley My Love" | | 3:12 |
| 6. | "Where's My Everything?" | | 2:40 |
| 7. | "12-Step Program (To Quit You Babe)" | | 3:11 |
| 8. | "Lover Don't Go" | | 4:03 |
| 9. | "Drive-Thru Man" | | 2:42 |
| 10. | "Withered on the Vine" | | 3:22 |
| 11. | "I Live on a Battlefield" | Lowe; Paul Carrack | 3:23 |
| 12. | "14 Days" | | 2:58 |
| 13. | "I'll Be There" | Rusty Gabbard; Ray Price | 2:13 |

== Personnel ==
- Nick Lowe – vocals, rhythm guitars, bass (5–7, 10–12)
- Geraint Watkins – organ, electric guitars, electric lead guitar (4)
- Bill Kirchen – electric guitars, trombone (1)
- Gary Grainger – fuzz guitar (11)
- Paul Riley – bass (1–4, 8, 9, 13)
- Bobby Irwin – drums
- Paul Laventhol – shakers (7)

=== Production ===
- Nick Lowe – producer
- Neil Brockbank – producer, mixing
- Paul Laventhol – session assistant
- David Scheinmann – cover photography
- Jimmy Gaston – personal photography
- Barry Jones – acrylic on cardboard ("the room")
- Valerie Boyd – design concept, back photography
- Clinton Blue – hair stylist
