= I Knew the Bride =

"I Knew the Bride (When She Used to Rock 'n' Roll)"

Single by Nick Lowe

from the album The Rose of England
- B-side: "Long Walk Back" (USA/Canada) "Darlin' Angel Eyes" (international)
- Released: August 1985
- Genre: Rock and roll, rockabilly, power pop, hard rock
- Length: 4:45
- Label: Columbia (USA/Canada); F-Beat (international)
- Songwriter(s): Nick Lowe
- Producer(s): Huey Lewis

Nick Lowe singles chronology
"L.A.F.S." (1984)	"I Knew the Bride (When She Used to Rock 'n' Roll)" (1985)	"Lovers Jamboree" (1987)

"I Knew the Bride (When She Used to Rock 'n' Roll)" is a song written by Nick Lowe and first popularised by Dave Edmunds, known as only “I Knew the Bride”. It was released on Edmunds's 1977 album Get It and a year later in a live version by Nick Lowe's Last Chicken in the Shop on Live Stiffs Live.

Edmunds, who had been insecure about his songwriting abilities, had turned to Lowe for help. Lowe then came up with "I Knew the Bride". Edmunds recalled, "Nick came up with 'I Knew The Bride', which was just perfect for me, and we wrote a couple of other things together. I remember 'I Knew The Bride' was written really quickly, it seemed like Nick had knocked out this brilliant, fully-formed rock 'n' roll song in about half an hour."

Lowe performed the song during a Stiff Records European tour with Elvis Costello, Ian Dury, Wreckless Eric, and Larry Wallis; the tour was filmed for the 1981 documentary If It Ain't Stiff, It Ain't Worth a Fuck. In 1985, Nick Lowe recorded a slower studio version for the album The Rose of England, produced by Huey Lewis (on harmonica) and featuring Lewis' band "The News". It reached #27 on the US rock chart and #77 on the US pop chart.

Edmunds released several live versions over the years, from 1987's I Hear You Rockin’, to 1999's KIng Biscuit Flour Hour Presents, to 2005's Live and Pickin’, and 2011's A Pile of Rock Live. He also released a remixed studio version on 1999's Hand Picked Musical Fantasies, which also appeared on the 2004 release From Small Things: The Best of Dave Edmunds. The original recording appeared on many of his compilation releases, including 1981's The Best of Dave Edmunds, 1994's Chronicles, and 2008's The Many Sides of Dave Edmunds: The Greatest Hits and More.

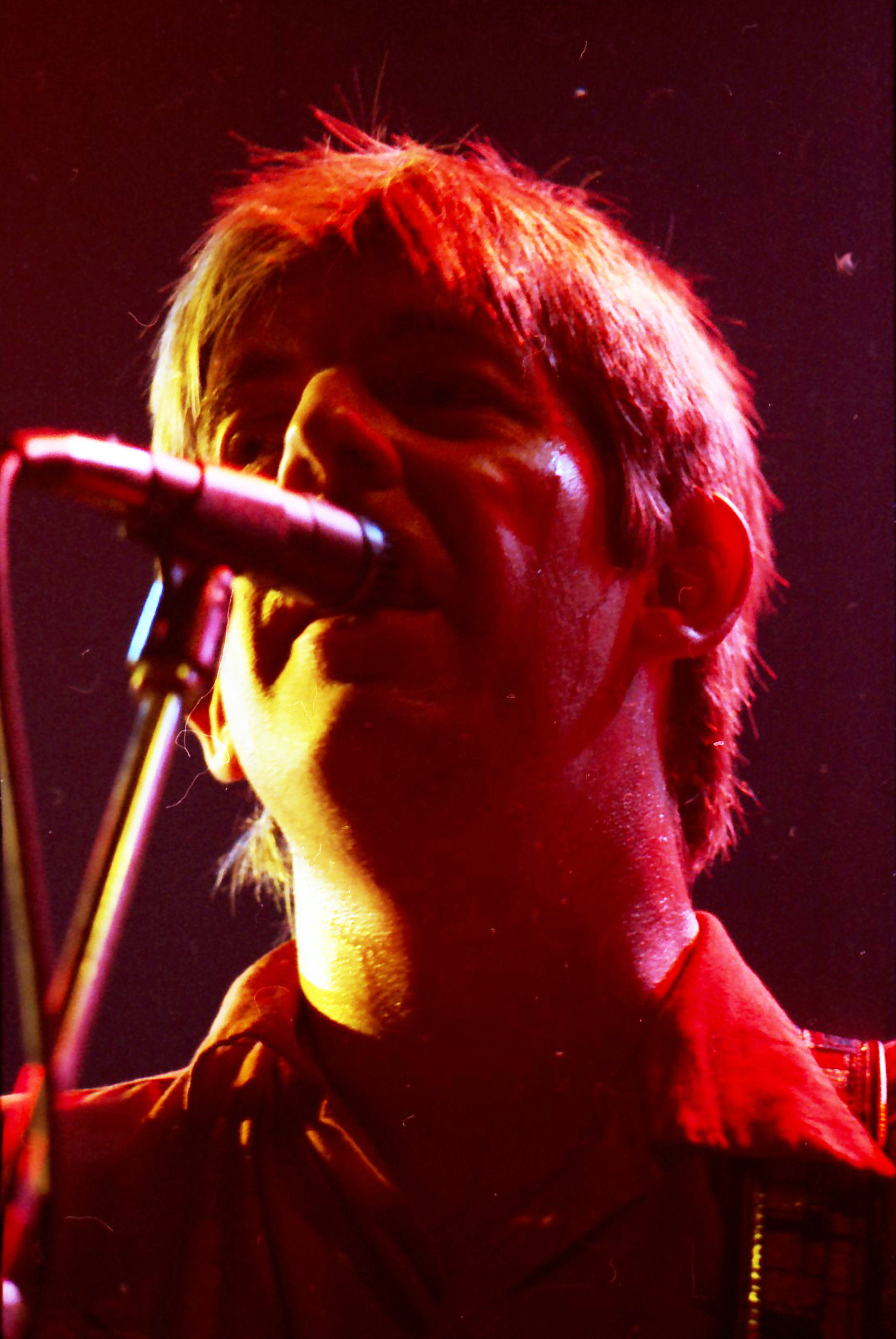
Lowe performing with Rockpile in 1980

Live versions featuring Edmunds and Lowe harmonizing appeared on two albums from Rockpile, the group featuring both singers, as well as Billy Bremner and Terry Williams. The official release was on the Live at Montreux 1980 album in 2011, but the song was also on the much earlier bootleg album They Call It Rock from the late 1970s.

== Other appearances ==
Hunter S. Thompson's Songs of the Doomed: More Notes on the Death of the American Dream, a 1990 anthology of essays and works of new journalism, has a chapter named after the song.

The song is part of the Sounds of the Seventies: Punk and New Wave from Time-Life Records.

British poet Hugo Williams titled his 11th book after the song; an earlier collection had similarly been named after an Everly Brothers song.

== Critical reception ==
Robert Christgau, upon the release of Live Stiffs Live, characterized the song as "Lowe's answer to "You Never Can Tell", a 1964 song by Chuck Berry. Decades later, Austin City Limits called it a "cheeky roots/pop tune." Don Waller called it, "the best Chuck Berry song that Chuck didn't write".

Of Lowe's album version, Spin said, "Backed by Huey Lewis's the News, it lacks the kick of either Edmunds’s or Rockpile’s version but affords Lowe a chance to redo one of his best songs with a popular American backing group and again test chart waters.

== Notable cover versions ==
Cover versions of the song have been released on various albums, including:

- 1983: Promised Land by Johnnie Allan
- 1987: as "I Knew the Bride (When She Used to be a Moll)" on Born Again Piss Tank by novelty singer Kevin Bloody Wilson
- 1992: Dream on Fire by Dion
- 1998: Very Best of the Knack, recorded for a greatest hits compilation album by The Knack, released by Rhino Records
- 2003: Live at 12th and Porter by Trent Summar & the New Row Mob
- 2008: Love Must Be Tough by Eleanor McEvoy
