= Party of One =

Studio album by Nick Lowe
- Released: February 22, 1990
- Recorded: March 1988 – October 1989
- Studio: Ocean Way Studios (Hollywood, California) Record One (Sherman Oaks, California)
- Genre: Rock and roll
- Length: 41:55
- Label: Reprise
- Producer: Dave Edmunds

Nick Lowe chronology
Pinker and Prouder than Previous (1988)	Party of One (1990)	The Impossible Bird (1994)

Professional ratings
Review scores
Source	Rating
AllMusic	3/5 stars
Robert Christgau	A−
Rolling Stone	4/5 stars

Party of One is an album by English singer-songwriter Nick Lowe. Produced by Dave Edmunds, it was released in 1990 by Reprise Records and reissued with altered cover art and two bonus tracks in 1995 by Upstart Records.

Party of One is one of only two Nick Lowe solo albums with no cover songs, as it is made up entirely of songs written or co-written by Lowe (the other album is 1982's Nick the Knife). One of the songs on Party of One, "All Men Are Liars," features a playful jab at Rick Astley and quotes from his 1987 song "Never Gonna Give You Up."

== Track listing ==
All songs written by Nick Lowe except as noted.

=== Side one ===
1. "You Got the Look I Like" - 3:21
2. "(I Want to Build a) Jumbo Ark" - 3:29
3. "Gai-Gin Man" - 2:45
4. "Who Was That Man?" - 3:02
5. "What's Shakin' on the Hill" - 4:00

=== Side two ===
1. "Shting-Shtang" - 3:20
2. "All Men Are Liars" - 3:22
3. "Rocky Road" (Lowe, Simon Kirke) - 3:22
4. "Refrigerator White" - 3:05
5. "I Don't Know Why You Keep Me On" - 3:15
6. "Honeygun" - 2:30

=== CD reissue bonus tracks ===
1. "You Stabbed Me in the Front" - 3:02
2. "Rocket Coast" - 3:15

== Personnel ==
- Nick Lowe – vocals, bass
- Paul Carrack – acoustic piano, organ, backing vocals
- Austin de Lone – acoustic piano, acoustic guitars, backing vocals
- Ry Cooder – electric guitars, mandolin, backing vocals
- Dave Edmunds – electric guitars, backing vocals
- Bill Kirchen – electric guitars, backing vocals
- Ray Brown – string bass (5)
- Jim Keltner – drums

=== Production ===
- Dave Edmunds – producer
- Dave Charles – engineer
- Stacy Baird – assistant engineer
- Steve Holroyd – assistant engineer
- Rail Rogut – assistant engineer
- Michael C. Ross – assistant engineer
- Nick Lowe – design
- Michael Krage – design
- Joern Kroeger – design (1995 re-release)
- Barry Marsden – photography

2017 Reissue credits

- David Glasser – remastering at Airshow Mastering (Boulder, Colorado)
- Paul Riley – tape transfers, archives
- Nathan Golub – art production
