= The Beast in Me (song) =

Song by Nick Lowe

"The Beast in Me" is a song by English musician Nick Lowe and first recorded by American singer Johnny Cash. The song features slow, mournful music and lyrics describing the narrator's struggle with destructive habits and personality traits: "The beast in me / Is caged by frail and fragile bars".

The recording debut for "The Beast in Me" was by Johnny Cash from his American Recordings album released in April 1994. Cash was Lowe's stepfather-in-law from 1979 to 1990, during Lowe's marriage to singer Carlene Carter. A live version of the song by Cash appears on his 2005 DVD Live at Montreux 1994.

Lowe's first recording of the song appeared in his album The Impossible Bird (November 1994). A live version by Lowe appears on his 2004 live album Untouched Takeaway.
