= Nick Lowe =

British singer (born 1949)

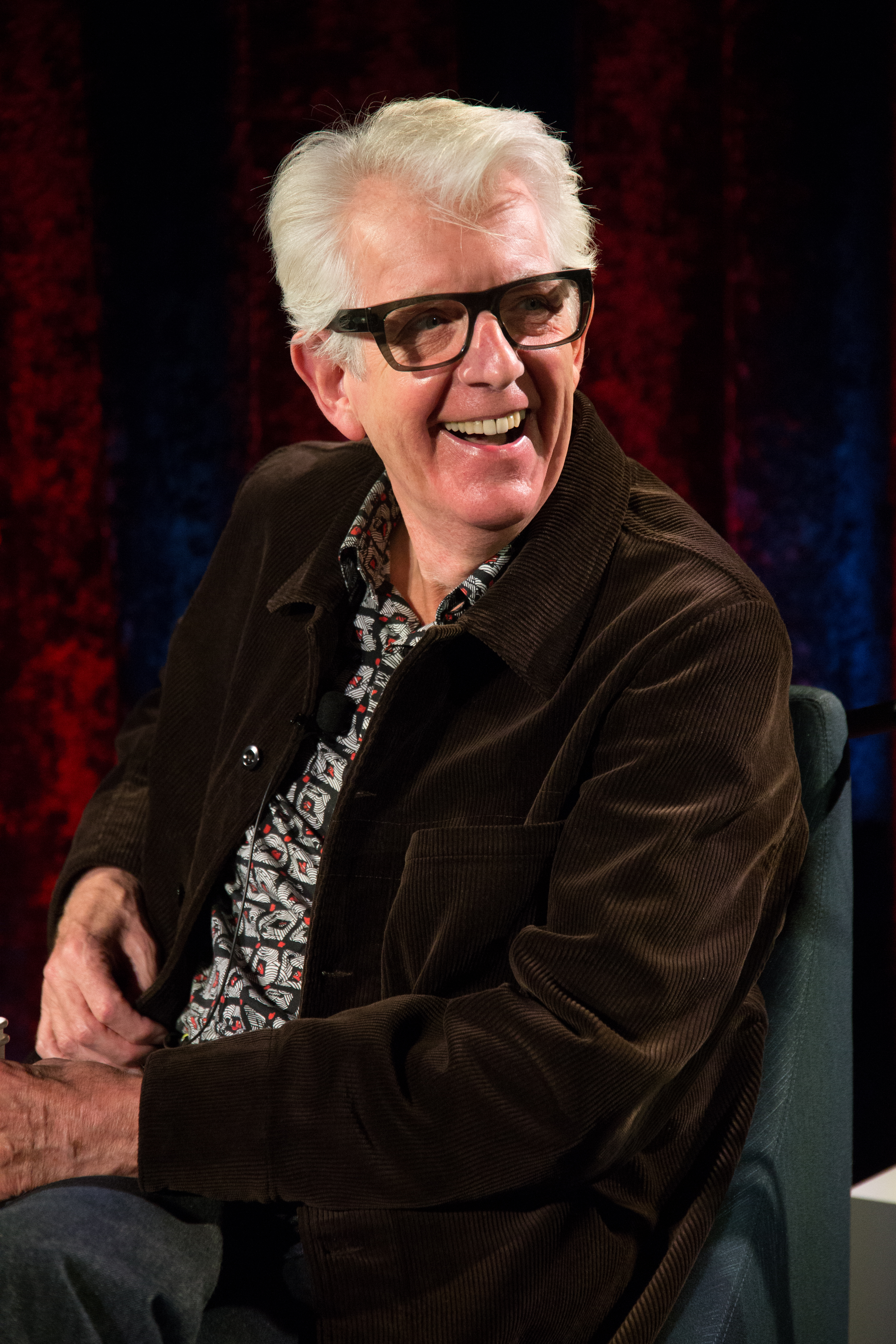
- Lowe in 2017

Background information
- Born: Nicholas Drain Lowe; 24 March 1949 (age 77); Walton-on-Thames, Surrey, England
- Genres: Pub rock; new wave; power pop
- Occupations: Musician; singer; songwriter; record producer
- Instruments: Vocals; bass; guitar; keyboards
- Works: Nick Lowe discography
- Years active: 1966–present
- Labels: Columbia; Demon; F-Beat; Radar; Reprise; Upstart; Yep Roc; Stiff; Proper
- Website: nicklowe.com

Nicholas Drain Lowe (born 24 March 1949) is an English singer, musician and producer. A noted figure in pub rock, power pop and new wave, Lowe has recorded a string of well-reviewed solo albums. Along with being a vocalist, Lowe plays guitar, bass guitar, piano and harmonica.

He is best known for the songs "Cruel to Be Kind" (a US top 40 single) and "I Love the Sound of Breaking Glass" (a top 10 UK hit), as well as his production work with Elvis Costello, Graham Parker, and others. Lowe also wrote "(What's So Funny 'Bout) Peace, Love, and Understanding", a hit for Costello and "I Knew the Bride (When She Used to Rock 'n' Roll)", a hit for Rockpile bandmate Dave Edmunds.

== Biography ==
Lowe attended the independent Woodbridge School in Suffolk. He began his musical career in 1967, when he joined the band Kippington Lodge, along with his school friend Brinsley Schwarz. They released a few singles on the Parlophone record label as Kippington Lodge before they renamed the band Brinsley Schwarz in late 1969 and began performing country and blues-rock. The band were launched by their management company Famepushers Ltd with an appearance at New York's Fillmore East; a planeload of British journalists were flown over by Famepushers to witness the event, but the stunt backfired and Brinsley Schwarz became a laughing stock until they established credibility on the London pub rock circuit. Lowe wrote some of his best-known compositions while a member of the band, including "(What's So Funny 'Bout) Peace, Love, and Understanding", a hit for Elvis Costello in 1979; and "Cruel to Be Kind", also in 1979, Lowe's single and biggest worldwide hit, co-written with bandmate Ian Gomm.

After leaving Brinsley Schwarz in 1975, Lowe joined Rockpile as a bassist and co-lead vocalist alongside Dave Edmunds. In August 1976, Lowe released "So It Goes" b/w "Heart of the City", the first single on the Stiff Records label, where he was an in-house producer. The single and the label were initially funded by a loan of £400 from Dr. Feelgood's Lee Brilleaux. The label's first EP was Lowe's 1977 four-track release Bowi, apparently named in response to David Bowie's contemporaneous LP Low. The joke was repeated when Lowe produced the Rumour's album Max as an 'answer' to Fleetwood Mac's Rumours. Lowe continued producing albums on Stiff and other labels, including the Damned's first album. In 1977, he produced Dr. Feelgood's album, Be Seeing You, which included "That's It, I Quit", written by Lowe. Private Practice, issued the next year, included "Milk and Alcohol", written by Lowe and Gypie Mayo. This song and "I Love the Sound of Breaking Glass" are the only Lowe compositions to reach the top 10 of the UK Singles Chart.

Because the two main singers in Rockpile had recording contracts with different record labels and managers, albums were always credited to either Lowe or Edmunds, so there is only one official Rockpile album, 1980's Seconds of Pleasure, which was not released until the waning days of the collaboration. Seconds of Pleasure featured the Lowe songs "When I Write the Book" and "Heart". However, two of the pair's most significant solo albums from the period, Lowe's Labour of Lust and Edmunds' Repeat When Necessary, were effectively Rockpile albums, as was Carlene Carter's Lowe-produced Musical Shapes album. Lowe's album Labour of Lust received a gold certification in Canada in November 1979. "Cruel to Be Kind", drawn from that album, was Lowe's only international top 40 hit, coincidentally reaching No. 12 in four separate territories: the UK, Canada, Australia, and the US (on Billboard Hot 100 chart) in 1979. "Cruel to Be Kind", which was a new Rockpile re-recording of a previously issued Brinsley Schwarz outtake, also charted in the top 40 in Ireland and New Zealand.

In 1979, Lowe married country singer Carlene Carter, daughter of fellow country singers Carl Smith and June Carter Cash and stepdaughter of Johnny Cash. He adopted her daughter, Tiffany Anastasia Lowe. The marriage ended in 1990, but they remained friends, and Lowe remained close to the Carter/Cash family. He played and recorded with Johnny Cash, and Cash recorded several of Lowe's songs. Lowe and Carter's 1979 wedding was filmed and the footage became the basis for the promotional video clip for "Cruel to Be Kind".

After the demise of Rockpile, Lowe toured for a period with his band Noise to Go and later with the Cowboy Outfit, which also included the noted keyboard player Paul Carrack. Lowe was also a member of the short-lived mainly studio project Little Village with John Hiatt, Ry Cooder and Jim Keltner, who originally got together to record Hiatt's 1987 album Bring the Family.

In 1990, he wrote the song "Who Was That Man?" which is about a man who died in the King's Cross fire. In 1992, "(What's So Funny 'Bout) Peace, Love, and Understanding" was covered by Curtis Stigers on the soundtrack album to The Bodyguard, an album that sold about 44 million copies worldwide.

A New York Daily News article quoted Lowe as saying his greatest fear in recent years was "sticking with what you did when you were famous." "I didn't want to become one of those thinning-haired, jowly old geezers who still does the same shtick they did when they were young, slim and beautiful," he said. "That's revolting and rather tragic." Rock critic Jim Farber observed, "Lowe's recent albums, epitomised by the new At My Age, moved him out of the realms of ironic pop and animated rock and into the role of a worldly balladeer, specialising in grave vocals and graceful tunes. Lowe's four most recent solo albums mine the wealth of American roots music, drawing on vintage country, soul and R&B to create an elegant mix of his own."

Lowe was quoted as saying that he had "escaped from the tyranny of the snare drum" in No Depression, (September–October 2001) when explaining his move away from regular pop music that would get played on mainstream radio.

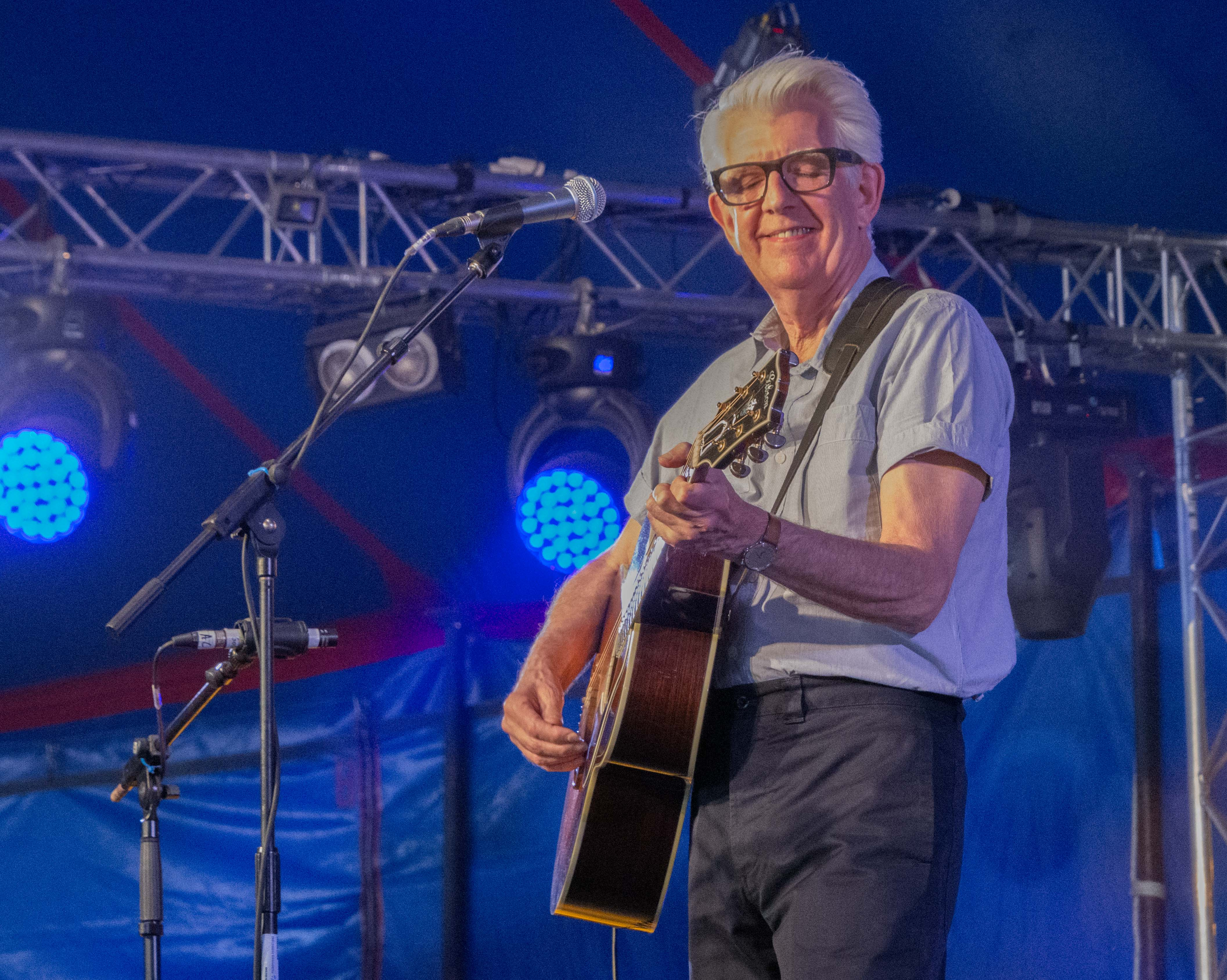
Lowe performing at the Ealing Blues Festival in 2019

In 2008, Yep Roc and Proper Records released a thirtieth anniversary edition of Lowe's first solo album, Jesus of Cool (entitled Pure Pop for Now People in the US, with a slightly different track listing). The re-issue includes tracks from the British and American releases in addition to several bonus tracks. In March 2009, he released a 49-track CD/DVD compilation of songs spanning his entire career. Proper Records released it in the UK and Europe, entitled Quiet Please... The New Best of Nick Lowe.

In September 2010, Yep Roc issued The Impossible Bird, Dig My Mood and The Convincer on vinyl for the first time, and after a one-night reunion concert with Elvis Costello in October in San Francisco, Lowe embarked on his first non-solo United States tour "this millennium." His backing band consisted of Geraint Watkins (keyboards), Robert Trehern (drums), Johnny Scott (guitar) and Matt Radford (bass). In March 2011, Yep Roc reissued Lowe's 1979 solo album Labour of Lust.

Lowe played Glastonbury 2011, performing a short solo set of Brinsley Schwarz tracks on The Spirit of 71 stage, where they played back in 1971, before heading to the Acoustic Stage for a full band show. On 29 October 2013, he released his first Christmas album, Quality Street, on Yep Roc Records. He performed two songs from this album on the 7 December taping of NPR's Wait Wait... Don't Tell Me!.

In spring 2019, he embarked on tours in both the US and UK, with American instrumental rock band Los Straitjackets. In June 2019, Lowe played at the Glastonbury Festival. In July 2024, he helped close out the Newport Folk Festival with Conan O'Brien.

== Personal life ==
Lowe has been married twice. His first marriage to country singer Carlene Carter lasted from 1979 to 1990. He married designer Peta Waddington in 2010. The couple have a son.

Lowe lives in Brentford, London, England.

== Career history ==
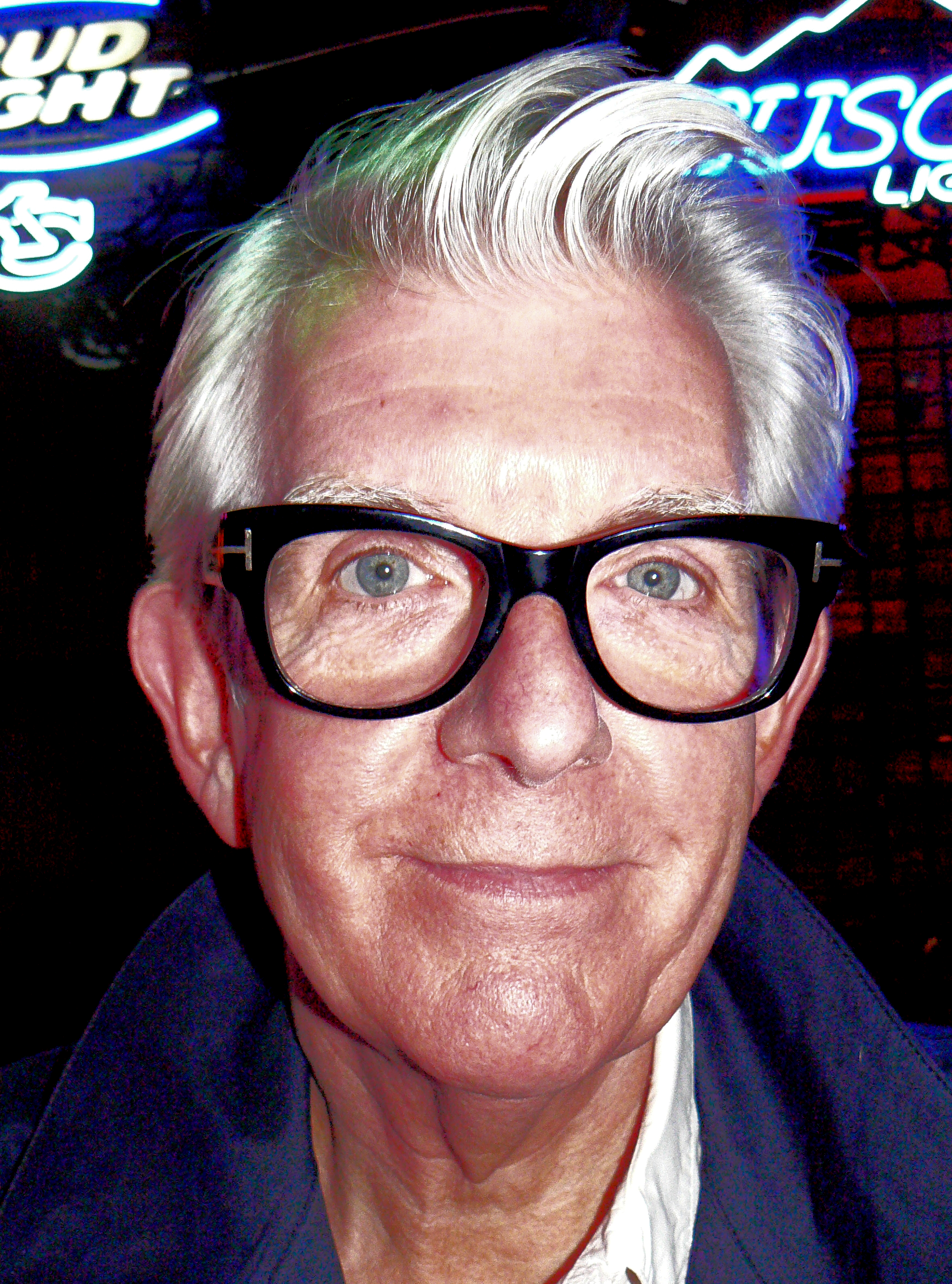
Lowe in 2012

=== Songwriter ===
Lowe's best-known songs include his own hits:

- "So It Goes" – first song on the Stiff Records label
- "I Love the Sound of Breaking Glass" – his biggest UK hit
- "Cruel to Be Kind" – his biggest US hit

He also wrote songs most famous for their cover versions:

- "(What's So Funny 'Bout) Peace, Love, and Understanding" – famously covered by Elvis Costello
- "I Knew the Bride (When She Used to Rock 'n' Roll)" – a hit for Rockpile bandmate Dave Edmunds
- "The Beast in Me" – covered by stepfather-in-law Johnny Cash

Some songs were written or co-written for albums he produced:

- "Milk and Alcohol" and "That's It, I Quit" – Dr. Feelgood
- "(I Live on a) Battlefield" and "I Need You" – Paul Carrack

Lowe also wrote a number of songs with clever wordplay that qualify as "novelties", among them:

- "Bay City Rollers We Love You" – recorded as "Terry Modern" of "The Tartan Horde"
- "I Love My Label" – paean to the United Artists label, released on Stiff Records
- "Time Wounds All Heels" – co-written with Carlene Carter and Simon Climie
- "All Men Are Liars"
- "Half a Boy and Half a Man" – covered by George Thorogood & The Destroyers

=== Producer ===
Lowe's work as a producer is at least as notable as his work as a performer and songwriter. His early 'rough and ready' production style earned him the nickname "Basher", inspired by his supposed instructions to bands to 'bash it out—we'll tart it up later'. Beginning with his tenure at Stiff Records as an in-house producer in 1976, Lowe was responsible for producing some of the benchmark releases of punk and new wave, including the Damned's first single, "New Rose", considered the first English punk single, as well as the group's debut album, Damned Damned Damned.

Lowe produced Elvis Costello's first five albums, from 1977 to 1981, including My Aim Is True, This Year's Model, and Armed Forces, which spun off numerous UK hit singles, as well Costello's eleventh studio album, Blood & Chocolate in 1986. Other Stiff acts produced by Lowe included punk parody group Alberto y Lost Trios Paranoias, new wave singer Wreckless Eric and roots rocker Mickey Jupp.

Other clients (both before and after Lowe left Stiff in 1978) included the Pretenders (the 1978 debut single "Stop Your Sobbing", which was a modest UK and U.S. hit); Graham Parker (his well-received first and third albums); Dr. Feelgood (several LPs, and their biggest hit single, 1979's "Milk and Alcohol"); Johnny Cash (his 1980 single "Without Love", a minor hit on the U.S. and Canadian country charts); and his then-wife Carlene Carter (2 albums in 1980 and 1981).

From 1982 to 1985, he produced material for (amongst others) Paul Carrack, John Hiatt, the Fabulous Thunderbirds and the Men They Couldn't Hang. Beginning in the mid-1980s, Lowe became more selective in his choice of outside production tasks, helming the 1986 LP Blood & Chocolate for Elvis Costello, a 1988 single ("Windows of the World" b/w "1969") for the Pretenders, the Katydids' self-titled debut album of 1990, and several 1991 tracks for the Liverpool-based band Rain. After that, Lowe essentially retired from producing recordings for other acts, although the country-rock band the Mavericks persuaded him to produce one track for the Apollo 13 soundtrack in 1995.

== Influence ==
In 2011, The New York Times claimed: "The 40-year career of the English singer-songwriter Nick Lowe constitutes a paradox: the songs he has written are better known than he is." Alex Turner, of the Arctic Monkeys, described Lowe as one of his favourite lyricists. In another interview, he said that he was "blown away" and sent "back to square one" by Lowe's songwriting.

Wilco covered the Nick Lowe song "I Love My Label" as the B-side to "I Might" (2011) on their own dBpm label. Nick Lowe toured with Wilco for their album The Whole Love and would make guest appearances on his "Cruel to Be Kind" and (along with Mavis Staples) appeared onstage for a cover of the Band's song "The Weight".

== Discography ==
Studio albums

- Jesus of Cool (1978)
- Labour of Lust (1979)
- Nick the Knife (1982)
- The Abominable Showman (1983)
- Nick Lowe and His Cowboy Outfit (1984)
- The Rose of England (1985)
- Pinker and Prouder Than Previous (1988)
- Party of One (1990)
- The Impossible Bird (1994)
- Dig My Mood (1998)
- The Convincer (2001)
- At My Age (2007)
- The Old Magic (2011)
- Quality Street: A Seasonal Selection for All the Family (2013)
- Indoor Safari (2024)

== See also ==
- List of 1970s one-hit wonders in the United States
