= Neil Brockbank =

British record producer, engineer and bass player (1951–2017)

- Born: February 1951
- Origin: England
- Died: 30 May 2017 (aged 66)
- Genres: Pop, rock
- Occupation(s): Bass guitarist, producer, engineer
- Years active: Early 1970s–2017
- Formerly of: Wooden Horse, The Hitmen, Nick Lowe

Neil Brockbank (February 1951 – 30 May 2017) was a British record producer, audio engineer and bass player. He is known for working in close collaboration with Nick Lowe spanning 25 years, producing all of Lowe's albums since 1994's The Impossible Bird.

== Career ==
Before working in music production and engineering, Brockbank was a member of the 1970s folk rock band Wooden Horse then later the new wave band the Hitmen.

As well as working alongside Nick Lowe, Brockbank also played instruments and produced albums for many other notable bands and artists including Mary Coughlan, Alison Moyet, Tanita Tikaram, Bryan Ferry, Martin Belmont, Geoffrey Williams, the Bolshoi, Ocean Colour Scene, Sterling Roswell, Geraint Watkins, My Darling Clementine, Micke Bjorklof & Blue Strip, Norman Bergen, Jim Lauderdale and PictureHouse.

In 2004, Brockbank founded the Goldtop Studio, set up at Jungle Records' old vinyl warehouse (in which Goldtop Recordings is a label imprint of Jungle) in Chalk Farm Road, Camden which he ran along with Paul Laventhol and Bobby Irwin. After the Chalk Farm premises were vacated, the studio reopened as Goldtop at Gravity Shack, Tooting Bec in 2011.

Brockbank died on 30 May 2017, after a short battle with cancer.
