= Geraint Watkins =

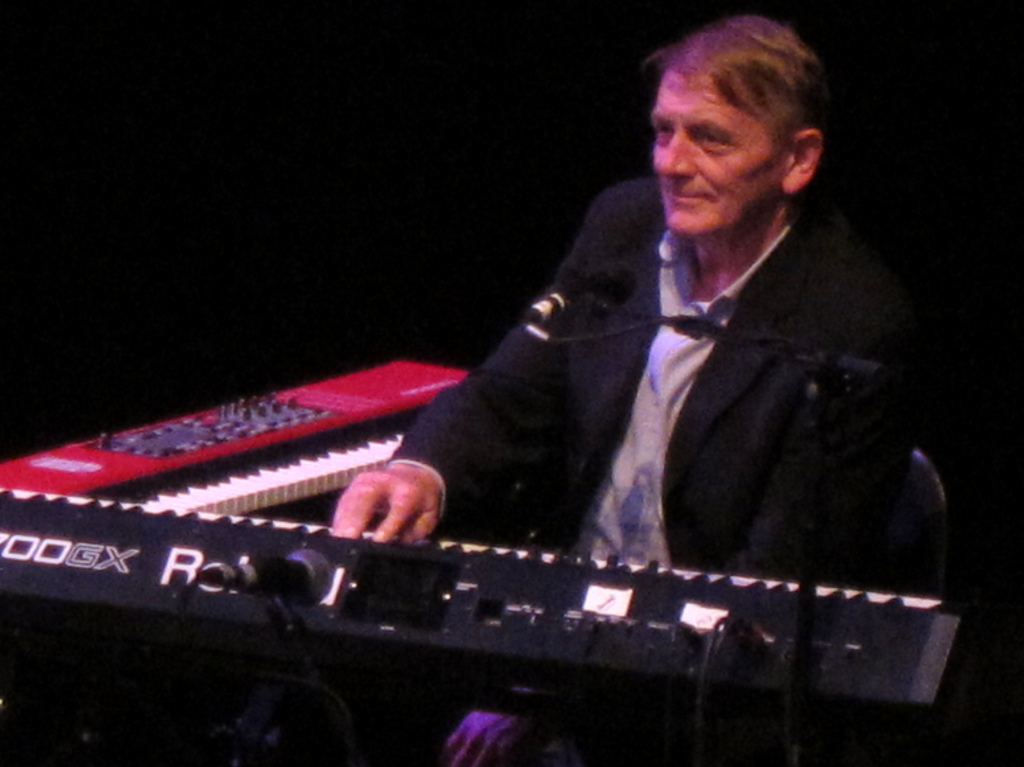
- Watkins in 2012

Background information
- Born: Geraint Meurig Vaughan Watkins; 5 February 1951 (age 75); Swansea, Wales
- Origin: Abertridwr, Wales
- Genres: Pub rock; rock; blues; jazz
- Occupations: Musician; songwriter
- Instruments: Keyboards; vocals; guitar; accordion; percussion
- Years active: 1970s–present
- Member of: The Balham Alligators

Geraint Meurig Vaughan Watkins (born 5 February 1951) is a Welsh singer, songwriter, rock and roll pianist and accordionist. He has backed many notable artists, including Nick Lowe, Dave Edmunds, Van Morrison, Mark Knopfler, Paul McCartney, Shakin' Stevens and most recently Status Quo. He has also pursued a solo career and issued a number of albums under his own name, the most recent of which, Rush of Blood, was released in September 2019.

== Biography ==
Watkins was born in Abertridwr, near Caerphilly, South Wales.

After time in the early 1970s at Portsmouth Art College, he returned to Cardiff and played with Red Beans & Rice and Juice on the Loose. The band Red Beans and Rice, attracted attention and moved to London to further their career. When they disbanded, Watkins played solo performances in London's pubs and with various bands, such as Southside United (with which he recorded an album), the Cable Layers, Klondike Pete and the Huskies, and the band of Southend's Micky Jupp on the 'Be Stiff Route 78' tour. He went on to record an album, Geraint Watkins & the Dominators (1979), produced by Andy Fairweather Low. Session work followed: producer Stuart Colman recruited him for what became hit records for Shakin' Stevens; also he was recording and/or performing with Dr. Feelgood, Rory Gallagher, Andy Fairweather Low, the Fabulous Thunderbirds, the Blues Band, Box of Frogs, Stray Cats, Carl Perkins, Crazy Cavan and the Rhythm Rockers, and Eric Clapton amongst others. He was a member of the star-studded Willie & the Poor Boys alongside Bill Wyman and other Rolling Stones members, taking lead vocals on two numbers. In 1980, he released a solo single on Stiff Records under the pseudonym Otis Watkins.

In between sessions, the 1980s and beyond found Watkins playing accordion and piano with the Balham Alligators, a band, of which he was a founding member, that has helped to keep the music of Louisiana alive in London's pubs. Throughout the 1980s, he also was a mainstay in Dave Edmunds's band, both recording and touring with him. Between 1984 and 1989, Watkins played piano and accordion on five records of the Dutch band Normaal. He contributed vocals, piano and accordion to Klondike Pete and the Huskies' 1981 album Some of the Fellers and appears as Lightning Wanson G, on their 2010 album Who Axed You. In recent years, Watkins has found time to work with Bill Wyman's Rhythm Kings; contributing to Nick Lowe's albums The Impossible Bird (1994), Dig My Mood (1998), The Convincer (2001), Untouched Takeaway (2004) and At My Age (2007); and to Van Morrison's albums Back on Top (1999), Down the Road (2002), Pay the Devil (2006) and Keep It Simple (2008).

As well as the early vinyl LP with the Dominators, Watkins has released five solo albums: Watkins – Bold as Love (1997), Dial W for Watkins (2004), In a Bad Mood (2008), Moustique (2014) and Rush of Blood (2019). AllMusic's Stephen Thomas Erlewine said of Dial W for Watkins, "It's slight on the surface – the love songs are sweet and short, there are lots of ragged edges and lots of jokes – but that's its appeal: it's warm, friendly, engaging music, perfect for a relaxing evening at home with old friends." Kerry Doole of Exclaim! called it "an unassuming but delightful effort." Jason MacNeil of PopMatters suggested that Watkins' proficiency in a multitude of music genres "is what makes this album so bloody special."

Billboard contributor Paul Sexton wrote that In a Bad Mood "displays Watkins' love for vintage R&B but also has more surprising sorties into chanson and cajun." Sexton ranked it as the number one album of 2008 on his year-end list; Billboard deputy global editor Tom Ferguson listed the album at number two.

In 2009 and 2011, Watkins toured with Bill Wyman's Rhythm Kings as keyboard and accordion player and singer. He toured with Peter Green & Friends as a keyboard player in 2010. Watkins also toured with, and opened for Nick Lowe, as a keyboardist.

In 2014, he played accordion on Status Quo's Aquostic (Stripped Bare) album. This was also featured, on 22 October 2014, as a live concert from the Roundhouse on BBC Radio 2 and on BBC television via the red button. Watkins played with the band on the subsequent UK tour. In September 2016 he performed, as part of the Aquostic line-up, at BBC Radio 2's Live in Hyde Park from Hyde Park, London.

As a songwriter, Geraint had his compositions covered by Don McLean, Pokey LaFarge, Dave Edmunds, NRBQ, Pearl Harbor, and the Holmes Brothers amongst others.

Watkins maintains his own Facebook page, where he frequently posts intimate musical performances.

A solo studio album, Rush of Blood, recorded in collaboration with Basement Jaxx's Simon Ratcliffe as producer, was released in 2019.

== Discography ==
=== Albums ===
- Geraint Watkins & the Dominators (1979), Vertigo, reissued in 2018 on Jungle
- Bold as Love (1997), Bluefive, reissued in 2018 on Jungle
- Dick Lovejoy's Original Southside United Volume 1 (1998, recorded in 1984), Ab-Fab
- The Official Bootleg (2001, recorded in 1988), MUSIPA
- The Bootleg After the Bootleg (2001, recorded in 1988), MUSIPA
- Dial 'W' for Watkins (2004), Yep Roc/Proper Records
- In a Bad Mood (2008, recorded 2005–2008), Goldtop Recordings
- Moustique (2014), Goldtop Recordings
- Rush of Blood (2019), The Last Music Company
- Arse in Gear (as Warent Atkins Trio) (2024), Ball and Chain Records

== Notes ==
- George Martin, Making Music: The Guide to Writing, Performing & Recording – Page 189, W. Morrow, 1983, ISBN 0-688-01465-8
- Pianist Geraint Watkins: 'Dial W' Pianist Geraint Watkins: 'Dial W'] by David Greenberger at NPR
