= Bobby Irwin =

English musician (1953–2015)

- Birth name: Robert William Irwin
- Also known as: Robert Trehern(e)
- Born: 23 March 1953; Hillingdon, Middlesex, England
- Died: 8 May 2015 (aged 62); Twickenham, South-west London, England
- Genres: Rock, pop, new wave
- Occupation(s): Musician, drummer, producer, songwriter
- Instrument: Drums
- Years active: 1970s–2015
- Formerly of: Nick Lowe and His Cowboy Outfit, Roogalator, the Sinceros, the Balham Alligators

Bobby Irwin (23 March 1953 – 8 May 2015) was an English drummer, record producer and songwriter. He is known for working in close collaboration with Nick Lowe as co-songwriter and drummer and as a member of Lowe's band the Cowboy Outfit, as well as being the drummer for Van Morrison. Irwin was also a member of the bands Roogalator, the Sinceros and the Balham Alligators.

As well as working alongside Nick Lowe and Van Morrison, Irwin also played drums/produced for many other bands and artists including Bryan Ferry, John Hiatt, Lene Lovich, Paul Carrack, Carlene Carter, Billy Bremner, Geraint Watkins, Jim Lauderdale, Eleni Mandell, Norman Bergen, Tres Chicas and My Darling Clementine.

Irwin was also known as Robert Trehern (or Treherne), being credited on certain releases under that name. Robert was his given name, and Trehern was his mother's maiden name.

Irwin died of cancer on 8 May 2015 in Twickenham. His funeral was held at St. Stephen's Church, Twickenham, on 19 May. Among those who attended were Nick Lowe, Geraint Watkins, saxophonist Martin Winning and Neil Brockbank, who also died of cancer two years later in 2017.
