= Dr. Feelgood discography =

- Studio albums: 17
- Live albums: 8
- Compilation albums: 19
- Singles: 35
- Video albums: 3
- Box sets: 4

This is the discography of English pub rock band Dr. Feelgood.

== Albums ==
=== Studio albums ===
Title	Album details	Peak chart positions			
Title	Album details	UK	FIN	NZ	SWE
Down by the Jetty	Released: January 1975; Label: United Artists; Formats: LP, MC	—	6	—	—
Malpractice	Released: October 1975; Label: United Artists; Formats: LP, MC, 8-track	17	6	—	—
Sneakin' Suspicion	Released: May 1977; Label: United Artists; Formats: LP, MC, 8-track	10	11	—	—
Be Seeing You	Released: September 1977; Label: United Artists; Formats: LP, MC	55	—	—	50
Private Practice	Released: 22 September 1978; Label: United Artists; Formats: LP, MC	41	—	—	—
Let It Roll	Released: November 1979; Label: United Artists; Formats: LP, MC	—	—	—	44
A Case of the Shakes	Released: 12 September 1980; Label: United Artists; Formats: LP, MC	—	—	—	34
Fast Women & Slow Horses	Released: October 1982; Label: Chiswick; Formats: LP, MC	—	—	—	—
Doctor's Orders	Released: September 1984; Label: Demon; Formats: LP, MC	—	—	—	—
Mad Man Blues	Released: October 1985; Label: Lolita; Formats: CD, MC	—	—	—	—
Brilleaux	Released: August 1986; Label: Stiff; Formats: LP, MC	—	34	26	—
Classic	Released: September 1987; Label: Stiff; Formats: CD, LP, MC	—	22	—	—
Primo	Released: June 1991; Label: Grand; Formats: CD, LP, MC	—	—	—	—
The Feelgood Factor	Released: July 1993; Label: Grand; Formats: CD, LP, MC	—	—	—	—
On the Road Again	Released: August 1996; Label: Grand; Formats: CD	—	—	—	—
Chess Masters	Released: 15 May 2000; Label: Grand; Formats: CD	—	—	—	—
Repeat Prescription	Released: September 2006; Label: Grand; Formats: CD; New renditions of old favourites	—	—	—	—
"—" denotes releases that did not chart or were not released in that territory.

=== Live albums ===
Title	Album details	Peak chart positions			
Title	Album details	UK	FIN	SPA	SWE
Stupidity	Released: 17 September 1976; Label: United Artists; Formats: LP, MC	1	7	29	—
As It Happens	Released: May 1979; Label: United Artists; Formats: LP, MC	42	—	—	31
On the Job	Released: July 1981; Label: Liberty; Formats: LP, MC	—	—	—	—
Live in London	Released: April 1990; Label: Grand; Formats: CD	—	—	—	—
Down at the Doctors	Released: April 1994; Label: Grand; Formats: CD, LP, MC	—	—	—	—
Speeding Thru Europe	Released: June 2003; Label: Grand; Formats: CD	—	—	—	—
Live at Rockpalast	Released: 16 December 2013; Label: Repertoire; Formats: CD+DVD, digital download	—	—	—	—
Live 1990	Released: 6 October 2017; Label: Demon; Formats: CD+DVD, LP, digital download	—	—	—	—
"—" denotes releases that did not chart or were not released in that territory.

=== Compilation albums ===
Title	Album details
Casebook	Released: November 1981; Label: Liberty; Formats: LP, MC
Case History – The Best of Dr Feelgood	Released: April 1987; Label: EMI; Formats: CD
Singles – The UA Years+	Released: May 1989; Label: Liberty/EMI; Formats: CD, 2xLP, MC
Stupidity Plus – Live 1976–1990	Released: April 1991; Label: Liberty; Formats: CD, 2xLP
Twenty Five Years of Dr. Feelgood	Released: April 1997; Label: Grand; Formats: 2xCD
The Best of Dr. Feelgood	Released: September 1997; Label: EMI; Formats: CD
Live at the BBC 1974–75	Released: June 1999; Label: Grand; Formats: CD
BBC Sessions 1973–1978	Released: 17 September 2001; Label: Grand; Formats: CD
Finely Tuned – The Guitar Album	Released: October 2002; Label: Grand; Formats: CD
Down at the BBC – In Concert 1977–78	Released: 4 November 2002; Label: Grand; Formats: CD
Wolfman Calling – The Blues of Lee Brilleaux	Released: June 2003; Label: Grand; Formats: CD
Complete Stiff Recordings	Released: January 2006; Label: Grand; Formats: 2xCD
Oily City Confidential	Released: 1 February 2010; Label: EMI; Formats: CD
Get Rhythm – The Best of Dr. Feelgood 1984–1987	Released: 7 October 2013; Label: Salvo; Formats: 2xCD
Adventures at the BBC – 1977 Onwards	Released: 27 January 2015; Label: Grand; Formats: 2xCD
I'm a Man – The Best of the Wilko Johnson Years 1974–1977	Released: 23 February 2015; Label: Parlophone; Formats: CD
Gettin' Their Kicks at the BBC with Wilko Johnson 1973–75	Released: 27 November 2015; Label: Grand; Formats: 2xCD
Rock 'n' Roll Gentleman – Eleven Recordings with Dr. Feelgood 1975–1993	Released: 17 October 2017; Label: Parlophone; Formats: LP
Greatest Hits	Released: 2 April 2021; Label: Grand; Formats: 2xCD

=== Box sets ===
Title	Album details	Peak chart positions		
Title	Album details	UK	FIN	SWE
Looking Back	Released: October 1995; Label: EMI; Formats: 5xCD	—	—	—
All Through the City (With Wilko 1974–1977)	Released: 13 April 2012; Label: EMI; Formats: 3xCD+DVD, digital download	85	43	47
Taking No Prisoners (With Gypie 1977–1981)	Released: 14 June 2013; Label: EMI; Formats: 4xCD+DVD, digital download	200	38	—
Original Album Series	Released: 11 November 2016; Label: Warner Music/Parlophone; Formats: 5xCD	—	—	—
"—" denotes releases that did not chart or were not released in that territory.

=== Video albums ===
Title	Album details
Live Legends	Released: September 1990; Label: Castle Music Pictures; Formats: VHS, LaserDisc
Dr Feelgood	Released: 2002; Label: Classic Rock Productions; Formats: DVD
Live in London	Released: 14 November 2005; Label:Grand; Formats: DVD

== Singles ==
Title	Year	Peak chart positions								Album
Title	Year	UK	AUS	FIN	GER	IRE	NZ	SPA	SWE	Album
"Roxette"	1974	—	—	—	—	—	—	—	—	Down by the Jetty
"She Does It Right"	1975	—	—	—	—	—	—	—	—	Down by the Jetty
"(Get Your Kicks On) Route 66" (Note: Only released in Japan.)	1975	—	—	—	—	—	—	—	—	Non-album single
"Back in the Night"	1975	—	—	—	—	—	—	—	—	Malpractice
"Riot in Cell Block No. 9" (Note: Only released in the Netherlands and Denmark. A live version was released in the UK in September 1976 inside first 20,000 copies of the Stupidity album)	1975	—	—	—	—	—	—	—	—	Malpractice
"Roxette" (live)	1976	53 (Note: Chart position is from the official UK "Breakers List".)	—	—	—	—	—	17	—	Stupidity
"Sneakin' Suspicion"	1977	47	—	—	—	—	—	—	—	Sneakin' Suspicion
"She's a Windup"	1977	34	—	—	—	—	—	—	—	Be Seeing You
"Baby Jane"	1977	—	—	—	—	—	—	—	—	Be Seeing You
"Ninety-Nine and a Half (Won't Do)" (Note: Only released in France.)	1977	—	—	—	—	—	—	—	—	Be Seeing You
"Down at the Doctors"	1978	48	—	—	—	—	—	—	—	Private Practice
"Milk and Alcohol"	1979	9	—	—	30	4	—	—	—	Private Practice
"As Long as the Price Is Right" (live)	1979	40	—	—	—	—	—	—	—	As It Happens
"Put Him Out of Your Mind"	1979	73	—	—	—	—	—	—	—	Let It Roll
"Hong Kong Money"	1980	—	—	—	—	—	—	—	—	Let It Roll
"No Mo Do Yakamo"	1980	—	—	—	—	—	—	—	—	A Case of the Shakes
"Jumping from Love to Love"	1980	—	—	—	—	—	—	—	—	A Case of the Shakes
"Violent Love"	1981	—	—	—	—	—	—	—	—	A Case of the Shakes
"Waiting for Saturday Night"	1981	—	—	—	—	—	—	—	—	Casebook
"Trying to Live My Life Without You"	1982	—	—	—	—	—	—	—	—	Fast Women & Slow Horses
"She's the One" (Note: Only released in Spain.)	1982	—	—	—	—	—	—	—	—	Fast Women & Slow Horses
"Crazy About Girls"	1983	—	—	—	—	—	—	—	—	Fast Women & Slow Horses
"Monkey"	1983	—	—	—	—	—	—	—	—	Fast Women & Slow Horses
"Living on the Highway" (Note: Only released in Germany.)	1983	—	—	—	—	—	—	—	—	Non-album single
"Dangerous"	1984	—	—	—	—	—	—	—	—	Doctor's Orders
"My Way"	1984	—	—	—	—	—	—	—	—	Doctor's Orders
"Mad Man Blues"	1985	—	—	—	—	—	—	—	—	Mad Man Blues
"Don't Wait Up"	1986	—	—	—	—	—	—	—	—	Brilleaux
"See You Later Alligator"	1986	93	59	—	—	—	14	—	2	Classic
"Hunting, Shooting, Fishing"	1987	—	—	—	—	—	—	—	—	Classic
"(I Wanna) Make Love to You" (Note: Only released in France and the Netherlands.)	1987	—	—	—	—	—	—	—	—	Classic
"Break These Chains" (Note: Only released in Europe.)	1987	—	—	—	—	—	—	—	—	Classic
"Milk and Alcohol" (New Recipe)	1989	97	—	—	—	—	—	—	—	Singles – The U.A. Years+
"Heart of the City"	1991	—	—	—	—	—	—	—	—	Primo
"You Can't Judge a Book by Looking at the Cover"	2020	—	—	—	—	—	—	—	—	Non-album single
"—" denotes releases that did not chart or were not released in that territory.
