= Twenty Five Years of Dr. Feelgood =

Compilation album by Dr. Feelgood
- Released: 9 February 1997
- Recorded: 1974–1996
- Genre: Rock, pub rock
- Label: Grand Records - Grand 20
- Producer: Various

Dr. Feelgood chronology
On The Road Again (1996)	Twenty Five Years of Dr. Feelgood (1997)	Centenary Collection (1997)

Professional ratings
Review scores
Source	Rating
Allmusic	4.0/5 stars

Twenty Five Years of Dr. Feelgood is a double compilation album by Dr. Feelgood, and was released in February 1997.

The compilation was edited down from the previously released five CD, Looking Back, box set. Forty tracks from the band were included, incorporating material from vocalist Lee Brilleaux's final concert before his death, and four later efforts with their next singer, Pete Gage. The opening tracks had original guitarist Wilko Johnson in the line-up.

== Track listing ==
=== Disc one ===
1. "She Does It Right" (Johnson) (3:22) - from Down by the Jetty
2. "I Don't Mind" (Johnson) (2:35) - from Down by the Jetty
3. "All Through the City" (Johnson) (3:01) - from Down by the Jetty
4. "Keep It Out of Sight" (Johnson) (3:00) - from the b-side of the single "Roxette"
5. "Roxette" (Johnson) - from Stupidity
6. "I Can Tell" (McDaniel, Smith) (2:43) - from Malpractice
7. "Sneakin' Suspicion" (Johnson) (3:50) - from Sneakin' Suspicion
8. "Back in the Night" (Johnson) (3:08) - from Stupidity
9. "Going Back Home" (Green, Johnson) (3:40) - from Stupidity
10. "Riot in Cell Block No. 9" (Leiber, Stoller) (3:49) - from Stupidity
11. "She's a Windup" (Brilleaux, Martin, Mayo, Sparks) (1:59) - from Be Seeing You
12. "That's It, I Quit" (Lowe) (2:35) - from Be Seeing You
13. "Night Time" (Feldman, Goldstein, Gottehrer) (5:26) - from Private Practice
14. "Milk and Alcohol" (Lowe, Mayo) (2:55) - from Private Practice
15. "Put Him Out of Your Mind" (Mayo, Vernon) (3:49) - from Let It Roll
16. "Shotgun Blues" (Brilleaux, Sparks, Martin, Mayo) (5:51) - from On The Job
17. "No Mo Do Yakamo" (Krekel) (2:14) - from A Case of The Shakes
18. "Jumping From Love to Love" (Brilleaux, Fasterley, Sparks, Mayo) (2:51) - from A Case of The Shakes
19. "Violent Love" (Rush) (2:21) - from A Case of The Shakes
20. "Rat Race" (Brilleaux, Guitar) (2:43) - from Fast Women and Slow Horses
21. "Crazy 'Bout Girls" (Guitar) (3:05) - from Fast Women and Slow Horses

=== Disc two ===
1. "Dangerous" (Brilleaux, Mitchell, Morris, Russell, Wallis) (4:08) - from Doctors Orders
2. "Mad Man Blues" (Hooker) (2:24) - from Mad Man Blues
3. "Dimples" (Hooker) (2:58) - from Mad Man Blues
4. "Hunting Shooting Fishing" (Birch, Russell) (3:16) - from Classic
5. "See You Later Alligator" (Guidry) (4:00) - from Classic
6. "King For a Day" (Brilleaux, Sparks, Martin, Mayo, Wallis) (2:10) - from Live in London
7. "Baby Jane" (Bishop, Nesbitt, Reed, Simmons, Wilson) (2:44) - from Live in London
8. "Sugar Turns to Alcohol" (Birch, Douglas, Dr. Feelgood) (4:43) - from Primo
9. "Down by the Jetty Blues" (Birch, Dr. Feelgood) (5:51) - from Primo
10. "Double Crossed" (Walwyn) (3:32) - from The Feelgood Factor
11. "Wolfman Callin'" (Bronze, Morris) (5:51) - from The Feelgood Factor
12. "One Step Forward" (Bronze) (4:45) - from The Feelgood Factor
13. "Roadrunner" (Dozier, Holland) (3:48) - from Down at the Doctors
14. "Down at the Doctors" (Jupp) (3:50) - from Down at the Doctors
15. "Heart of the City" (Lowe) (3:35) - from Down at the Doctors
16. "World Keeps Turning" (Green) (3:47) - from On the Road Again
17. "Instinct To Survive" (Walwyn) (3:21) - from On the Road Again
18. "Going Out West" (Waits) (3:21) - from On The Road Again
19. "You Got Me" (Brim) (4:46) - from On the Road Again

== Credits ==
- Stef Suchomski - cover artwork
- Christopher Somerville - sleeve notes
- Kevin Morris - compilation
- Jeremy Cooper - remastering at The Master Room, London
