= List of Dr. Feelgood members =

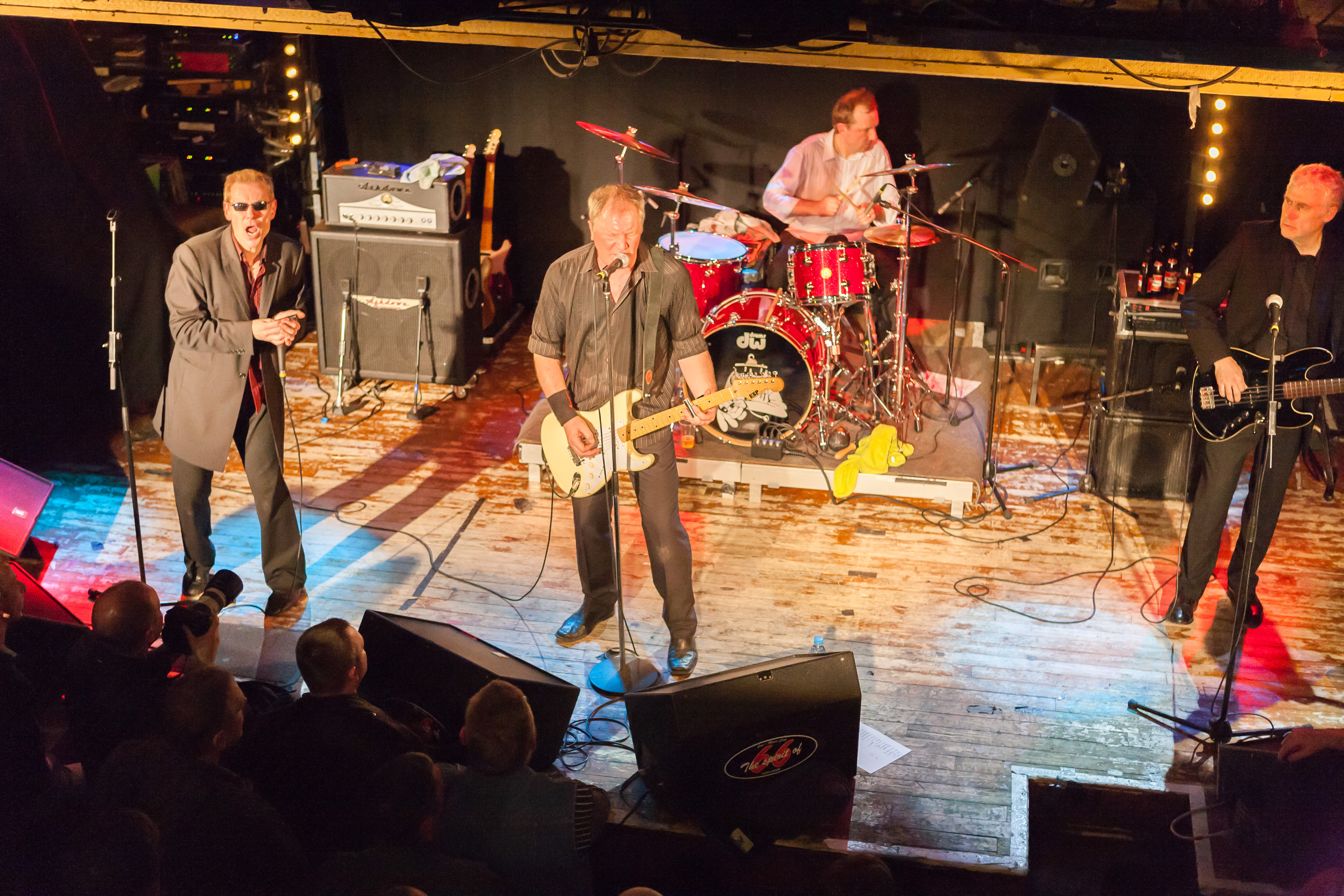
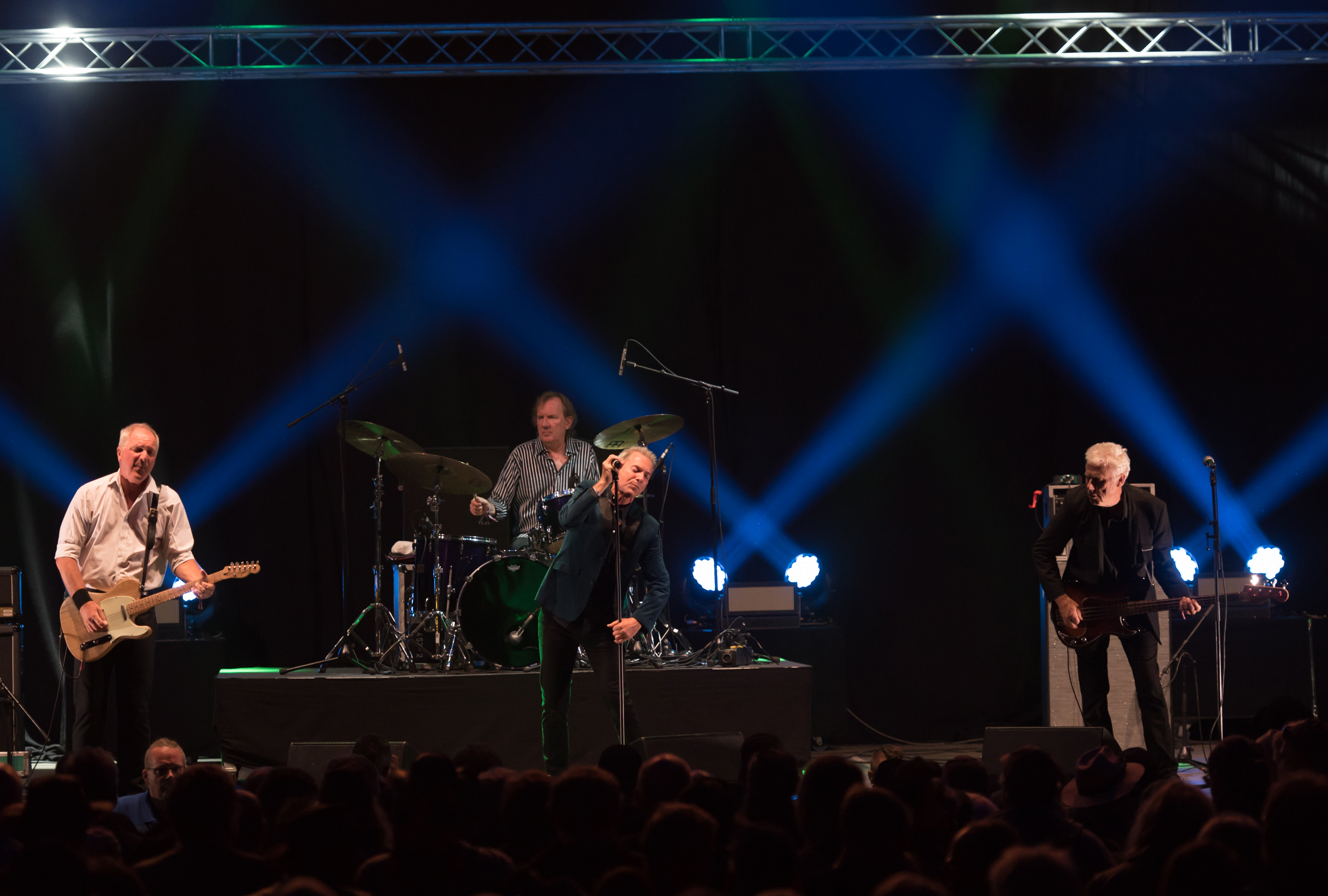
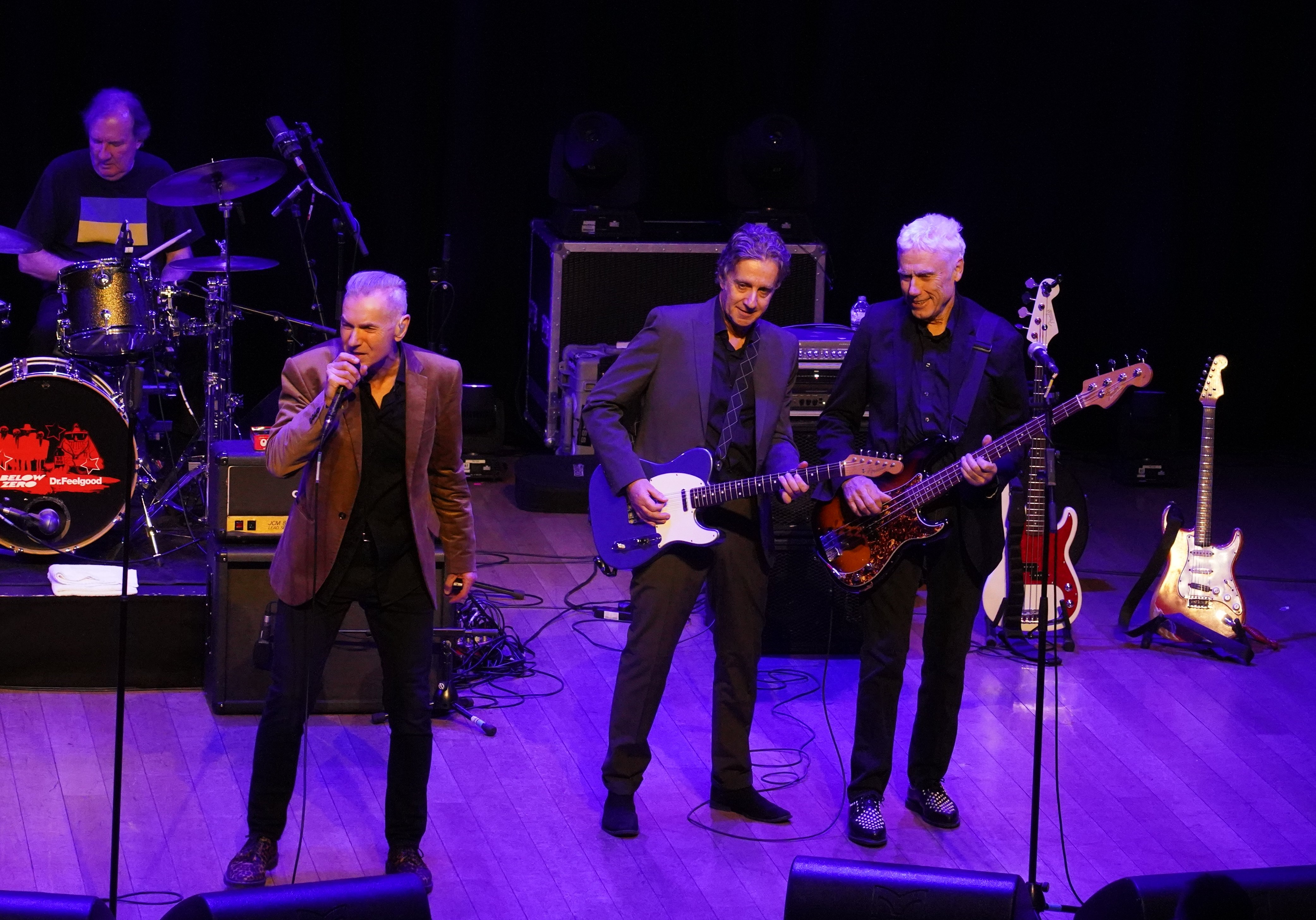
Two lineups of Dr. Feelgood in 2009, 2018 and 2023.

Dr. Feelgood are an English pub rock band from Canvey Island, Essex. Formed in January 1971, the group originally consisted of lead vocalist, harmonicist and slide guitarist Lee Brilleaux (real name Lee Collinson), lead guitarist and second vocalist Wilko Johnson (real name John Wilkinson), bassist John B. "Sparko" Sparks, pianist John Potter and drummer Terry "Bandsman" Howarth. The group's current line-up feature drummer Kevin Morris (since 1983), bassist and guitarist Phil H. Mitchell (from 1983 to 1991, and since 1995), lead vocalist and harmonicist Robert Kane (since 1999) and lead guitarist Gordon Russell (from 1983 to 1989 and since 2021),

== History ==
=== 1971–1983 ===
Brilleaux, Johnson, Sparks, Potter and Howarth formed Dr. Feelgood in January 1971, although by April both Potter and Howarth had left, with John "The Big Figure" Martin taking over on drums. This line-up released three studio albums and one live collection, before Johnson left on 2 April 1977 due to tensions with other members of the band. Before a full-time replacement was found, the group performed a handful of shows with substitute guitarist Henry McCullough and keyboardist Tim Hinkley. By the end of the month, Johnson had been replaced on a permanent basis by John Mayo, who was later nicknamed "Gypie" by Brilleaux after he told the guitarist that he "always had the gyp". Sneakin' Suspicion, the last album to feature Johnson, was released after the change in personnel.

After spending nearly four years in the band, Mayo left Dr. Feelgood in early 1981 and was replaced by Johnny "Guitar" Crippen of the Count Bishops in June. Just one release followed, Fast Women and Slow Horses, after which the group suffered a major setback when the long-standing rhythm section of Sparks and Martin left in April 1982. Brilleaux and Crippen completed a pre-booked European tour with stand-in bassist Pat McMullen and drummer Buzz Barwell, before disbanding the group at the end of the year. Just three months later, however, Brilleaux – persuaded by band manager Chris Fenwick – relaunched Dr. Feelgood with new lead guitarist Gordon Russell (who had auditioned for Mayo's vacated role two years earlier), bassist Phil H. Mitchell and, later, drummer Kevin Morris.

=== 1983 onward ===
The line-up of Brilleaux, Russell, Mitchell and Morris released four studio albums between 1984 and 1987. However, after touring for the first three months of 1989, Russell took a temporary leave of absence from the band when his infant daughter died of cot death syndrome. Former guitarist Gypie Mayo returned for a string of dates as the band continued their European tour, before Russell left permanently after a short French run in May and Steve Walwyn joined in his place. In 1991, during the recording of the band's first album in four years, Primo, Mitchell left Dr. Feelgood; the recordings were completed by temporary fill-in Ben Connelly and later Dave Bronze. Craig Rhind took over for the subsequent touring cycle when Bronze was unavailable due to commitments with Procol Harum.

During the recording of The Feelgood Factor in 1993, front-man Brilleaux was diagnosed with Hodgkin lymphoma. The band ceased touring as a result, but performed a final pair of shows on 24 and 25 January 1994 at their own Dr. Feelgood Music Bar in Canvey Island, which was recorded for the live album Down at the Doctors. Ian Gibbons performed on keyboards at the shows. Just over two months later, on 7 April 1994, Brilleaux died of his illness at the age of 41. Following the death of Brilleaux, Dr. Feelgood disbanded, before returning in June 1995 with new singer Pete Gage joining returning members Walwyn, Mitchell and Morris. A live album On the Road Again was issued in 1996, Gage left in August 1999 and former Animals II singer Robert Kane took his place.

On 16 June 2021, it was announced that Walwyn was "unavailable to play live shows for the foreseeable future". Later concerts were played by former guitarist Gordon Russell, whom Walwyn had replaced 32 years before.

== Members ==
=== Current ===
Image	Name	Years active	Instruments	Release contributions
	Phil H. Mitchell	1983–1991; 1995–present	bass; acoustic guitar; backing vocals	all Dr. Feelgood releases from Doctor's Orders (1984) to Primo (1991); On the Road Again (1996); Chess Masters (2000); Speeding Thru Europe (2003); Live in London (2005); Repeat Prescription (2006); Live 1990 (2013)
	Gordon Russell	1983–1989; 2021–present	guitar; backing vocals	all Dr. Feelgood releases from Doctor's Orders (1984) to "Milk and Alcohol (New Recipe)" (1989)
	Kevin Morris	1983–1994; 1995–present	drums; percussion; backing vocals	all Dr. Feelgood releases from Doctor's Orders (1984) to On the Road Again (1996); Chess Masters (2000); Speeding Thru Europe (2003); Live in London (2005); Repeat Prescription (2006); Live 1990 (2013)
	Robert Kane	1999–present	lead vocals; harmonica	Chess Masters (2000); Speeding Thru Europe (2003); Live in London (2005); Repeat Prescription (2006)

=== Former ===
Image	Name	Years active	Instruments	Release contributions
	Lee Brilleaux (Lee Collinson)	1971–1982; 1983–1994 (until his death)	lead vocals; harmonica; slide guitar	all Dr. Feelgood releases from Down by the Jetty (1975) to Down at the Doctors (1994); Live at the BBC 1974–5 (1994); BBC Sessions 1973–1978 (2001); Down at the BBC in Concert 1977–78 (2002); Going Back Home (2005); Live at Rockpalast (2013); Live 1990 (2013); Live at the BBC (2018)
	John B. "Sparko" Sparks	1971–1982	bass; backing vocals	all Dr. Feelgood releases from Down by the Jetty (1975) to "Crazy About Girls" (1982); Live at the BBC 1974–5 (1994); BBC Sessions 1973–1978 (2001); Down at the BBC in Concert 1977–78 (2002); Going Back Home (2005); Live at Rockpalast (2013); Live at the BBC (2018)
	Wilko Johnson (John Wilkinson)	1971–1977 (died 2022)	guitar; piano; backing and lead vocals	all Dr. Feelgood releases from Down by the Jetty (1975) to Sneakin' Suspicion (1977); Live at the BBC 1974–5 (1994); BBC Sessions 1973–1978 (2001); Going Back Home (2005); Live at the BBC (2018)
	John Potter	1971	piano	none
	Terry "Bandsman" Howarth	1971	drums	none
	John "The Big Figure" Martin	1971–1982	drums; percussion; backing vocals	all Dr. Feelgood releases from Down by the Jetty (1975) to "Crazy About Girls" (1982); Live at the BBC 1974–5 (1994); BBC Sessions 1973–1978 (2001); Down at the BBC in Concert 1977–78 (2002); Going Back Home (2005); Live at Rockpalast (2013); Live at the BBC (2018)
	Gypie Mayo (John Cawthra)	1977–1981 (substitute 1989) (died 2013)	guitar; backing vocals	all Dr. Feelgood releases from Be Seeing You (1977) to "Waiting for Saturday Night" (1981); BBC Sessions 1973–1978 (2001); Down at the BBC in Concert 1977–78 (2002); Live at Rockpalast (2013)
	Johnny "Guitar" Crippen	1981–1982	guitar; backing vocals	Fast Women and Slow Horses (1982); "Crazy About Girls" (1982)
	Buzz Barwell	1982; 1983 (died 2004)	drums	none
	Pat McMullen	1982	bass	none
	Dave Bronze	1991 (session); 1992–1994	bass; backing vocals	Primo (1991); The Feelgood Factor (1993); Down at the Doctors (1994); Chess Masters (2000)
	Craig Rhind	1991–1992	bass	none
	Pete Gage	1995–1999	lead vocals; harmonica	On the Road Again (1996)
	Steve Walwyn	1989–1994 1995–2021	guitar; backing vocals	all Dr. Feelgood releases from Live in London (1990) to On the Road Again (1996) Chess Masters (2000) Speeding Thru Europe (2003) Live in London (2005) Repeat Prescription (2006) Live 1990 (2013)

=== Touring ===
Image	Name	Years active	Instruments	Details
	Tim Hinkley	1977	keyboards	McCullough and Hinkley performed a handful of dates with Dr. Feelgood following Wilko Johnson's departure.
	Henry McCullough	1977 (died 2016)	lead guitar	McCullough and Hinkley performed a handful of dates with Dr. Feelgood following Wilko Johnson's departure.
	Barry Martin	1988	lead guitar	The Hamsters guitarist Martin performed at several Dr. Feelgood shows in 1988 in place of Gordon Russell.
	Ian Gibbons	1994 (died 2019)	keyboards	Gibbons performed at Lee Brilleaux's last two shows in January 1994, as well as on several studio albums.

== Lineups ==
Period	Members	Releases
January – April 1971	Lee Brilleaux – lead vocals, harmonica, slide guitar; Wilko Johnson – lead guitar, backing vocals; John B. Sparks – bass, backing vocals; Terry "Bandsman" Howarth – drums; John Potter – piano	none
April 1971 – April 1977	Lee Brilleaux – lead vocals, harmonica, slide guitar; Wilko Johnson – lead guitar, piano, backing vocals; John B. Sparks – bass, backing vocals; The Big Figure – drums, percussion, backing vocals	Down by the Jetty (1975); Malpractice (1975); Stupidity (1976); Sneakin' Suspicion (1977); Live at the BBC 1974–5 (1994); BBC Sessions 1973–1978 (2001); Going Back Home (2005); Live at the BBC (2018)
April 1977 – March 1981	Lee Brilleaux – lead vocals, harmonica, slide guitar; Gypie Mayo – lead guitar, backing vocals; John B. Sparks – bass, backing vocals; The Big Figure – drums, percussion, backing vocals	Be Seeing You (1977); Private Practice (1978); As It Happens (1979); Let It Roll (1979); A Case of the Shakes (1980); On the Job (1981); "Waiting for Saturday Night" (1981); BBC Sessions 1973–1978 (2001); Down at the BBC in Concert 1977–78 (2002); Live at Rockpalast (2013)
June 1981 – April 1982	Lee Brilleaux – lead vocals, harmonica, slide guitar; Johnny Guitar – lead guitar, backing vocals; John B. Sparks – bass, backing vocals; The Big Figure – drums, percussion, backing vocals	Fast Women and Slow Horses (1982); "Crazy About Girls" (1982)
April – December 1982	Lee Brilleaux – lead vocals, harmonica, slide guitar; Johnny Guitar – lead guitar, backing vocals; Pat McMullen – bass; Buzz Barwell – drums	none
Band inactive December 1982 – March 1983
March – May 1983	Lee Brilleaux – lead vocals, harmonica, slide guitar; Gordon Russell – lead guitar, backing vocals; Phil H. Mitchell – bass, acoustic guitar, backing vocals; Buzz Barwell – drums	none
May 1983 – May 1989	Lee Brilleaux – lead vocals, harmonica, slide guitar; Gordon Russell – lead guitar, backing vocals; Phil H. Mitchell – bass, acoustic guitar, backing vocals; Kevin Morris – drums, percussion, backing vocals	Doctor's Orders (1984); Mad Man Blues (1985); Brilleaux (1986); Classic (1987); "Milk and Alcohol (New Recipe)" (1989)
June 1989 – March 1991	Lee Brilleaux – lead vocals, harmonica, slide guitar; Steve Walwyn – lead and slide guitars, backing vocals; Phil H. Mitchell – bass, acoustic guitar, backing vocals; Kevin Morris – drums, percussion, backing vocals	Live in London (1990); Primo (1991) – three tracks only; Live 1990 (2017)
March – September 1991	Lee Brilleaux – lead vocals, harmonica, slide guitar; Steve Walwyn – lead and slide guitars, backing vocals; Dave Bronze – bass, backing vocals; Kevin Morris – drums, percussion, backing vocals	Primo (1991) – remaining tracks
September 1991 – May 1992	Lee Brilleaux – lead vocals, harmonica, slide guitar; Steve Walwyn – lead and slide guitars, backing vocals; Craig Rhind – bass; Kevin Morris – drums, percussion, backing vocals	none
May 1992 – April 1994	Lee Brilleaux – lead vocals, harmonica, slide guitar; Steve Walwyn – lead and slide guitars, backing vocals; Dave Bronze – bass, backing vocals; Kevin Morris – drums, percussion, backing vocals	The Feelgood Factor (1993); Down at the Doctors (1994)
Band inactive April 1994 – June 1995
June 1995 – August 1999	Pete Gage – lead vocals, harmonica; Steve Walwyn – lead and slide guitars, backing vocals; Phil H. Mitchell – bass, acoustic guitar, backing vocals; Kevin Morris – drums, percussion, backing vocals	On the Road Again (1996)
August 1999 – June 2021	Robert Kane – lead vocals, harmonica; Steve Walwyn – lead and slide guitars, backing vocals; Phil H. Mitchell – bass, acoustic guitar, backing vocals; Kevin Morris – drums, percussion, backing vocals	Chess Masters (2000); Speeding Thru Europe (2003); Live in London (2005); Repeat Prescription (2006)
June 2021 – present	Robert Kane – lead vocals, harmonica; Gordon Russell – lead and slide guitars, backing vocals; Phil H. Mitchell – bass, acoustic guitar, backing vocals; Kevin Morris – drums, percussion, backing vocals	
