= Sneakin' Suspicion (song) =

- Germany-only picture sleeve

Single by Dr. Feelgood

from the album Sneakin' Suspicion
- B-side: "Lights Out"
- Released: May 1977
- Recorded: 1977
- Genre: Rock and roll, pub rock
- Length: 3:50
- Label: United Artists Records - UP 36255
- Songwriter: Wilko Johnson
- Producer: Bert de Coteaux

Dr. Feelgood singles chronology
"Roxette (live)" (1976)	"Sneakin' Suspicion" (1977)	"She's a Windup" (1977)

"Sneakin' Suspicion" is a song by the band Dr. Feelgood. It was recorded in 1977 and was the first track on their album, Sneakin' Suspicion, which was released in May that year. It was recorded at the Rockfield Studios and mixed at the Media Sounds Studios in New York.

"Sneakin' Suspicion" was also issued as a single in the United Kingdom in May 1977. It reached number 47 in the UK Singles Chart and spent three weeks in the listing. Written by Wilko Johnson and produced by Bert de Coteaux, it was Dr. Feelgood's first hit single. and the only hit single to feature Johnson, the other five all featuring Gypie Mayo.

The B-side of the record, "Lights Out", was written by Seth David and Mac Rebennack.

The track was Dr. Feelgood's first UK charted song but it was not their first single release. "Sneakin' Suspicion" was preceded by "Roxette" (November 1974), "She Does It Right" (March 1975), "Back in the Night" (July 1975) and "Roxette" (live) (September 1976). "Riot In Cell Block No. 9" (live) b/w "Johnny B. Goode" (live) was a free 7" single available with their September 1976 live album, Stupidity.

The sleeve shown is from the German release, as the UK release did not have a picture sleeve.

"Sneakin' Suspicion" was also later included in Dr. Feelgood's 1997's compilation album, Twenty Five Years of Dr. Feelgood.
