= Pete Gage =

Pete Gage may refer to:

- Pete Gage (guitarist) (born 1947), English guitarist and producer noted for his work with Geno Washington, Vinegar Joe and Elkie Brooks
- Pete Gage (singer) (born 1946), English vocalist noted for his work with Jet Harris and Dr. Feelgood
