= Cupid's Inspiration =

UK musical group active 1968-present

- Origin: Stamford, Lincolnshire
- Genres: Pop music, rock music
- Years active: 1968—1985, 2014—2021
- Past members: Members
- Website: Roger Gray's Cupid's Inspiration: http://www.cupidsinspirationuk.com Terry Rice-Milton's Cupid's Inspiration: http://www.cupidsinspiration.co.uk

Cupid's Inspiration are a British pop group formed in Lincolnshire in 1968. The band are best known for their two hit singles, "Yesterday Has Gone" (UK #4) and "My World" (UK #33), both released in 1968.

The current version of the band consists of a group formed by original member Roger Gray in 2014, who allowed the band to carry on after he retired in 2021; this band features veteran member Paul Shanahan and vocalist Paul Thomas.

== Career ==
Originally from Stamford, Lincolnshire, the band were at first called The Ends (no relation to The End).

The group scored two Top 40 hits on the UK Singles Chart in 1968. "Yesterday Has Gone", originally a hit for Little Anthony and The Imperials, reached No. 4 in July of that year, and "My World" went to No. 33 in October. The lineup on both of these records was Terry Rice-Milton on lead vocals, Wyndham George on guitar, Laughton James on bass, Garfield Tonkin on keyboards and Roger Gray on drums.

After "My World" was released, the band realising they could not achieve commercial success with mainstream music forever changing, disbanded in October 1968. A few months later, in early 1969, Rice-Milton and Gray reformed the band with Bernie Lee on guitar and Gordon Haskell on bass and released their only album to date.

In 1970, lead singer Terry Rice-Milton the vocalist on the hit singles left, replaced by John Lynch and then Martin Cure. Rice-Milton had his third hit with "You're My World" in 1970 (a song that had previously been a hit for Cilla Black), while bass player Gordon Haskell later joined King Crimson.

The band continued to tour without Terry and until early 1972 still featured Roger Gray, who left the band to spend more time with his wife and daughter. After Gray left, the band still toured without any of its original members.

By 1978, the band began writing and recording heavier rock songs. These were performed under a different name, initially '4 Wheel Drive', which they soon changed to 'Chevy', to avoid alienating Cupid's Inspiration fans. They recruited Steve Walwyn, later of Dr. Feelgood to give a "twin guitar" sound. As 'Chevy' they toured supporting bands such as Alvin Lee, Hawkwind and Gillan. Chevy recorded two BBC In Concert Programmes, issued three singles: "Too Much Loving" / "See the Light", "The Taker" / "Life on the Run" and "Just Another Day" / "Rock On" and one album The Taker, released in September 1980.

The band's hit single, featuring Terry-Rice Milton, "Yesterday Has Gone" (written by Teddy Randazzo and Victoria Pike) has featured on many compilation albums, including Sixties Power Ballads – The Greatest Driving Anthems in the World... Ever! (2007) as well as their original album Yesterday Has Gone (1969).

In more recent years, there were two bands that toured as "Cupid's Inspiration", one that featured original drummer Roger Gray and another that featured original singer Terry Rice-Milton and bassist Laughton James:

One of these bands was formed in 2010 by Paul Shanahan, Bob Poole (both members of the band in the 1970s), with Paul Thomas and Rick Medlock, Medlock then being replaced by original member Roger Gray in 2014, who toured until 2021 when Gray retired. However he gave his blessing to Shanahan, Poole and Thomas to hire a new drummer and keyboards member to carry on the band.

Another Cupid's Inspiration band, formed by original members Terry Rice-Milton and Laughton James, was formed in the mid-2010s and lasted for a few years. Rice-Milton now sings solo, performing the songs of Cupid's Inspiration.

Wyndham George died in 2022.

Martin Cure died in December 2025.

== Members ==
- Terry Rice-Milton (born Terence Bull, 5 June 1946, Stamford, Lincolnshire) – lead vocals (1968—1970)
- Laughton James (born James Laughton, 21 December 1946, Stamford, Lincolnshire) – bass guitarist (early—October 1968)
- Garfield Tonkin (born John Sharpe, 28 September 1946, Stamford, Lincolnshire) – keyboards (1968—1969)
- Wyndham George (born Geoffrey Wyndham Hart, 20 February 1945, Stamford, Lincolnshire; died 4 June 2022) – guitar (early—October 1968)
- Roger Gray (born 29 April 1949, Stamford) – drums (1968—1972, 2014—present)
- Bernie Lee (born July 1943, North Wales) – lead guitar (October 1968—1970)
- Gordon Haskell (born Gordon Hionides, 27 April 1946, Verwood, Dorset, England) – bass (October 1968—1969)
- David Morris – electronic organ (1969—1971)
- Derek Needham (born 10 October 1945, London) – bass (1969—1971)
- Paul Shanahan (born 28 June 1951) – lead guitar/vocals (1970—1985, 2010—present)
- John Lynch – lead vocals (1970—1971)
- Graham Amos – bass (1970)
- Bob Poole – bass guitar/vocals (1970—1985, 2010—present)
- Martin Cure (died 15 December 2025) – lead vocals (1971—1985)
- Andy Chaplin – drums (1972—1981)
- Eamonn Carr – guitar/vocals (1972)
- Steve Walwyn – guitar (1978—1981)
- Barry Eardley – guitar (1981—1985)
- Ted Duggan – drums (1981—1983)
- Paul Brooke – drums (1983—1985)
- Paul Thomas – vocals (2010—present)

=== Timeline ===
Years	Band Name	Lead singer	Guitarist		Bassist	Keyboardist	Drummer
Early 1968—October 1968	Cupid's Inspiration	Terry Rice-Milton	Wyndham George		Laughton James	Garfield Tonkin	Roger Gray
October 1968—early 1969	Disbanded						
Early 1969—late 1969	Cupid's Inspiration	Terry Rice-Milton	Bernie Lee		Gordon Haskell	none	Roger Gray
late 1969—1970	Cupid's Inspiration	Terry Rice-Milton	Bernie Lee		Derek Needham	David Morris	Roger Gray
1970	Cupid's Inspiration	John Lynch	Paul Shanahan		Derek Needham	David Morris	Roger Gray
1970	Cupid's Inspiration	Martin Cure	Paul Shanahan		Graham Amos	none	Roger Gray
1970—1972	Cupid's Inspiration	Martin Cure	Paul Shanahan		Bob Poole	none	Roger Gray
1972	Cupid's Inspiration	Martin Cure	Paul Shanahan	Eamonn Carr	Bob Poole	none	Andy Chaplin
1972—1978	Cupid's Inspiration	Martin Cure	Paul Shanahan		Bob Poole	none	Andy Chaplin
1978	4 Wheel Drive	Martin Cure	Paul Shanahan	Steve Walwyn	Bob Poole	none	Andy Chaplin
1978—1981	Chevy	Martin Cure	Paul Shanahan	Steve Walwyn	Bob Poole	none	Andy Chaplin
1981—1982	Chevy	Martin Cure	Paul Shanahan	Barry Eardley	Bob Poole	none	Ted Duggan
1982—1983	Chevy	Martin Cure	Paul Shanahan	Barry Eardley	Bob Poole	none	Ted Duggan
1983—1985	Red on Red	Martin Cure	Paul Shanahan	Barry Eardley	Bob Poole	none	Paul Brookes
1985—2014	Disbanded						
2014—2021	Cupid's Inspiration	Paul Thomas	Paul Shanahan		Bob Poole	none	Roger Gray

== Discography ==
=== Albums ===
Year	Label	Title
1969	NEMS	Yesterday Has Gone

=== Singles ===
Year	Label	A-side	B-side	UK
1968	NEMS	"Yesterday Has Gone"	"Dream"	4
1968	NEMS	"My World"	"Everything Is Meant To Be"	33
1969	Bell	"The Sad Thing"	"Look At Me"	X
1970	CBS	"Without Your Love"	"Different Guy"	X
1970	CBS	"Are You Growing Tired Of My Love"	"Sunshine"	X
1974	DJM	"Yesterday Has Gone"	"My World"	X
1987	MBS	"Yesterday Has Gone"	"My World"	X
