= Stupidity (Dr. Feelgood album) =

Live album by Dr. Feelgood
- Released: September 1976
- Recorded: May 23 & November 8, 1975
- Venues: Sheffield City Hall; Southend Kursaal
- Genres: Rock, pub rock
- Length: 47:01
- Label: United Artists - UAS 29990
- Producer: Dr. Feelgood

Dr. Feelgood chronology
Malpractice (1975)	Stupidity (1976)	Sneakin' Suspicion (1977)

Professional ratings
Review scores
Source	Rating
AllMusic	4.5/5 stars
Select	4/5

Stupidity is a live album by English rock band Dr. Feelgood. It was released in September 1976 and is the band's third overall album. Their mushrooming popularity was confirmed when Stupidity (1976) topped the UK Albums Chart.

The album reached number one on the UK Albums Chart in October 1976 (for one week) and remained on the chart for nine weeks. It was the first live album to top the UK chart in its first week of release. It was Dr. Feelgood's first and, to date, only recording to reach number one, and appeared over eight months before their first single entered the corresponding UK Singles Chart – "Sneakin' Suspicion" (June 1977).

Along with Rock Follies in 1976, it reached the top spot in the UK without the benefit of a hit single. In 2013, NME ranked it at number 267 in its list of the 500 Greatest Albums of All Time.

== Track listing ==
All tracks composed by Wilko Johnson; except where indicated

=== Side 1 ===
1. "Talking About You" (Chuck Berry)
2. "20 Yards Behind"
3. "Stupidity" (Solomon Burke)
4. "All Through The City"
5. "I'm a Man" (Bo Diddley)
6. "Walking The Dog" (Rufus Thomas)
7. "She Does It Right"

=== Side 2 ===
8. "Going Back Home" (Mick Green, Johnson)
9. "I Don't Mind"
10. "Back in the Night"
11. "I'm a Hog for You Baby" (Leiber, Stoller)
12. "Checking Up on My Baby" (Sonny Boy Williamson)
13. "Roxette"

=== Bonus 7" single ===
14. "Riot in Cell Block No. 9" (Leiber, Stoller)
15. "Johnny B. Goode" (Chuck Berry)

=== Stupidity + (Dr. Feelgood - Live - 1976–1990) CD Bonus tracks ===
16. "Take a Tip"
17. "Every Kind of Vice"
18. "She's a Wind Up"
19. "No Mo Do Yakamo"
20. "Love Hound"
21. "Shotgun Blues"
22. "King for a Day"
23. "Milk and Alcohol"
24. "Down At The Doctors"

The original vinyl album had the first seven tracks on Side 1, recorded in Sheffield, and the next six tracks on Side 2, recorded in Southend. A free single, only issued with the first 20,000 copies, included the final two tracks recorded in Aylesbury. The 1998 Grand Records re-release (GRANDCD 21) states that tracks 8–15 were all recorded at Southend, but this was finally corrected with the box-set release of All Through The City (2012), where it emerged that "Johnny B. Goode" had indeed been recorded at Friars in Aylesbury.

An extended CD version of the album was released in 1991 (CDP795934-2) entitled Stupidity + and sub-titled Dr. Feelgood - Live - 1976–1990. The additional nine live tracks were all recorded post-1977 in the period after Johnson had left the band.

== Chart positions ==
Chart	Year	Peak position
UK Albums Chart	1976	1

Chart (2025)	Peak position
Croatian International Albums (HDU)	31
Hungarian Physical Albums (MAHASZ)	32

== Personnel ==
Dr. Feelgood

- Lee Brilleaux - vocals, guitar, harmonica, slide guitar
- Wilko Johnson - guitar, backing vocals
- John B. Sparks - bass guitar
- The Big Figure - drums, backing vocals

Technical

- Dr. Feelgood - producer
- Vic Maile - audio engineer, mixing
- Will Birch - liner notes
- Paul Henry - design
