= Gypie Mayo =

English guitarist and songwriter (1951–2013)

- Born: John Philip Cawthra; 24 July 1951; Hammersmith, London, England
- Died: 23 October 2013 (aged 62); Bath, Somerset, England
- Other names: John Mayo
- Occupations: Musician; songwriter
- Spouse: Lesley Foster (m. 1980, separated)
- Partner: Jenny Carruthers
- Children: 1
- Relatives: Mark Cawthra (brother)
- Musical career
- Genres: Rock
- Instrument: Guitar
- Formerly of: Dr. Feelgood; The Yardbirds

John "Gypie" Mayo (born John Philip Cawthra; 24 July 1951 − 23 October 2013) was a British guitarist and songwriter, playing in Dr. Feelgood from 1977 to 1981, and from 1996 to 2004 in the reborn Yardbirds with Alan Glen.

== Early career ==
Mayo was born in Hammersmith, London, on 24 July 1951. At an early age, he listened to the classical music his father played while at home. Later, he heard "Apache" by The Shadows and enjoyed the record. However, it was when Mayo saw the group on television with their Fender Stratocasters that he became passionate.

I was instantly hooked. I bought all their records etc. aged 10–11. Then the Beatles happened and the whole music thing changed. At about this time I acquired a cheap Russian made acoustic (1964) and taught myself Beatles/Stones etc. songs. I chose the guitar 'cos I'd always been fascinated with its sounds + looks ever since becoming a Shadows freak.

— Gypie Mayo, May 1997

After being expelled from school, Cawthra began using the performing name of Mayo and worked in a printing shop before joining the blues band White Mule in 1969. The band stayed together for about a year and played all over the United Kingdom, along with gigs in Switzerland and France. They released a single on MCA Records which was produced by Mike Leander. After White Mule, Mayo played in various rock line-ups during the early to mid-1970s including Halcyon, 747 and Alias. He also was part of an Irish traditional band called Concrete Mick where he played the mandolin before becoming Wilko Johnson's replacement in Dr Feelgood.

== With Dr. Feelgood ==
Mayo had been relatively unknown until early 1977 when he replaced Wilko Johnson in Dr. Feelgood, although Henry McCullough had temporarily stood in when Johnson left. He was known as John Mayo until, having suffered several minor ailments, Dr. Feelgood's Lee Brilleaux said "you've always got the gyp" and the nickname stuck.

Mayo played with Dr. Feelgood for four years and on six albums (Be Seeing You, Private Practice, As It Happens, Let It Roll, A Case of the Shakes and On The Job). He co-wrote the Feelgood's only UK Top 10 single "Milk and Alcohol" with Nick Lowe, and played on four of the five other Dr. Feelgood singles to have appeared in the UK Singles Chart ("She's A Wind Up", "Down at the Doctors", "As Long As The Price is Right" and "Put Him Out of Your Mind"); the only Feelgood single to have charted without him was "Sneakin' Suspicion".

== Later life and death ==
Mayo's guitar work was featured on the Yardbirds' 2003 album, Birdland.

He lived in Bath, Somerset, where he played in several bands, taught guitar, and made guest appearances on albums such as Pete Gage's Tough Talk.

On 23 October 2013, it was announced that Mayo had died at the age of 62. News of Mayo's death broke, when former Feelgood guitarist Wilko Johnson posted a message on his Facebook page stating: "Very sad to hear Gypie Mayo passed away this morning..RIP Gypie." Mayo was informally separated from his wife Lesley Cawthra (née Foster) whom he married in 1980. He is survived by their son, and by his partner Jenny Carruthers. Carruthers has since campaigned for the legalisation of assisted dying.
