= Put Him Out of Your Mind =

Single by Dr. Feelgood

from the album Let It Roll
- B-side: "Bend Your Ear"
- Released: August 1979
- Recorded: 1979
- Genre: Rock and roll, pub rock
- Length: 3:50
- Label: United Artists Records - BP 306
- Songwriter(s): Gypie Mayo, Mike Vernon
- Producer(s): Mike Vernon

Dr. Feelgood singles chronology
"As Long As The Price is Right" (1979)	"Put Him Out of Your Mind" (1979)	"Hong Kong Money" (1980)

"Put Him Out of Your Mind" is a song by the band Dr. Feelgood. The track was recorded in 1979, and appeared on Let It Roll, an album by Dr. Feelgood that was released in September that year.

"Put Him Out of Your Mind" was also released as a single in the UK in August 1979, a month prior to the album's issue. Written by band member Gypie Mayo and the record producer Mike Vernon, the song was Dr. Feelgood's sixth and final hit single. It reached number 73 in the UK Singles Chart, and spent just one week in the listing.

The B-side of the gramophone record was "Bend Your Ear"; penned by Mayo and the band's lead vocalist, Lee Brilleaux (now deceased). The joint recording was engineered by Dick Plant and John McGowan at the DJM Studios. The picture sleeve shown is of the German release, which was the only issue with a picture sleeve.

In addition to Let It Roll, the song later appeared on Dr. Feelgood's 1989 compilation album, Singles - The UA Years.
