= Peaches! =

Studio album by the Black Keys
- Released: May 1, 2026
- Length: 44:51
- Labels: Easy Eye Sound; Warner
- Producer: The Black Keys

The Black Keys chronology
No Rain, No Flowers (2025)	Peaches! (2026)

Singles from Peaches!
- 1. "You Got to Lose" Released: February 6, 2026

Peaches! is the fourteenth studio album by the American rock duo the Black Keys, released on May 1, 2026, by Easy Eye Sound and Warner Records. It is a covers album. Pitchfork stated it was "billed as the Black Keys at their 'most natural' since their 2002 debut, The Big Come Up".

== Release and promotion ==
Peaches! was released on May 1, 2026. The first single from the album, "You Got to Lose", originally recorded by George Thorogood and the Destroyers, was released on February 6.

The album cover was created by Michael Carney, brother of drummer Patrick. Michael had previously designed the first ten album covers for the band, including winning the 2011 Grammy Award for Best Recording Package for his work on their album Brothers. The photo on the cover was taken by William Eggleston; Eggleston's photography was also used by Carney on Delta Kream, the last album he worked on for the band before Peaches!, which was also a covers album.

== Reception ==
The album has 3.5/5 stars on AllMusic, and a Metacritic score of 74 indicating "generally favorable reviews." Clash rated the album 8/10, stating; "'Peaches!' is full of dynamism, swirling riffs and pounding drumbeats. It never loses itself in the melee. With their fourteenth record the band have gone full circle, proving why they became household names in the first place." A 4/5 star review for Classic Rock stated "By returning to their sonic roots, The Black Keys sound revitalised, urgent and gloriously unrefined once again. Whether they pursue this righteous path remains to be seen, but this is exactly what’s needed from them now."

Pitchfork gave the album a score of 6.0/10.0, stating disappointment, "I feel a little sad for these fellas, now nearing 50 but sporting a less clear picture of what the Black Keys actually are than they had at 30. They feel one misstep away from the state-fair circuit." Paste gave the album a C− score, stating "Rather than demonstrating the duo in their natural state, à la early records like The Big Come Up and Thickfreakness, Peaches! feels like the sonic equivalent of pre-distressed denim: it looks worn-in, but that’s because it was manufactured that way."

== Track listing ==
Peaches! track listing
No.	Title	Writer(s)	Length
1.	"Where There's Smoke, There's Fire"	Willie Griffin	5:00
2.	"Stop Arguing Over Me"	Levester Carter	4:02
3.	"Who's Been Foolin' You"	Arthur Crudup	3:44
4.	"It's a Dream"	Charles Fisher, Jr.	3:36
5.	"Tomorrow Night"	David Kimbrough, Jr.	3:55
6.	"You Got to Lose"	Earl Hooker	3:17
7.	"Tell Me You Love Me"	Jesse Mae Brooks	4:27
8.	"She Does It Right"	Wilko Johnson	3:43
9.	"Fireman Ring the Bell"	R. L. Burnside	5:47
10.	"Nobody but You Baby"	Kimbrough	7:13
Total length:			44:51

== Personnel ==
Credits are adapted from Tidal.

=== The Black Keys ===
- Dan Auerbach – lead vocals, guitar, production, mixing (all tracks); organ (track 3)
- Patrick Carney – drums, production, mixing (all tracks); shaker (3, 4, 7)

=== Additional contributors ===
- M. Allen Parker – mixing, engineering
- Jonny Ullman – mixing, additional engineering
- Henry Bright – engineering assistance
- Tate Sablatura – engineering assistance
- Tyler Zwiep – engineering assistance
- Ryan Smith – mastering
- Eric Deaton – bass
- Kenny Brown – guitar
- Jimbo Mathus – backing vocals, Wurlitzer (1); synthesizer (2), guitar (3, 5–8), organ (3, 4, 8), shaker (4–6, 8); bells, harp (4); acoustic guitar, piano (7)
- Chris St. Hilaire – tambourine (1, 2), shaker (1, 9), cowbell (9)
- Tommy Brenneck – horns arrangement (1, 8)
- Cochemea Gastelum – alto saxophone (1, 8)
- Jared Tankel – baritone saxophone (1, 8)
- Ian Hendrickson-Smith – tenor saxophone (1, 8)
- Dave Guy – trumpet (1, 8)
- Simon Guzman – horns engineering (1, 8)
- Andy Gabbard – backing vocals (2, 6, 9)
- Kenny Kimborough – drums (2, 9)
- Michael Carney – cover artwork

== Charts ==
Chart performance for Peaches!
Chart (2026)	Peak position
Australian Albums (ARIA)	58
Austrian Albums (Ö3 Austria)	12
Belgian Albums (Ultratop Flanders)	20
Belgian Albums (Ultratop Wallonia)	7
Croatian International Albums (HDU)	1
Dutch Albums (Album Top 100)	19
French Albums (SNEP)	48
German Albums (Offizielle Top 100)	7
German Rock & Metal Albums (Offizielle Top 100)	2
Greek Albums (IFPI)	29
Hungarian Physical Albums (MAHASZ)	4
Japanese Western Albums (Oricon)	22
New Zealand Albums (RMNZ)	34
Norwegian Physical Albums (IFPI Norge)	4
Portuguese Albums (AFP)	177
Scottish Albums (Official Charts)	7
Spanish Albums (Promusicae)	76
Swedish Physical Albums (Sverigetopplistan)	16
Swiss Albums (Schweizer Hitparade)	5
UK Albums (Official Charts)	33
UK Americana Albums (Official Charts)	3
UK Jazz & Blues Albums (Official Charts)	1
US Billboard 200	72
US Americana/Folk Albums (Billboard)	7
US Top Rock & Alternative Albums (Billboard)	16
