= Mick Green =

English guitarist (1944–2010)

- Born: Michael Robert Green; 22 February 1944; Matlock, Derbyshire
- Died: 11 January 2010 (aged 65) Ilford, Essex
- Genre: Rock and roll
- Occupation: Guitarist
- Instrument: Fender Telecaster Custom
- Years active: 1956–2010
- Formerly of: Johnny Kidd & the Pirates

Michael Robert Green (22 February 1944 – 11 January 2010) was an English rock and roll guitarist who played with The Pirates (with and without Johnny Kidd), Billy J. Kramer and the Dakotas, and Shanghai, with Cliff Bennett of The Rebel Rousers

== Biography ==
Born Michael Robert Green, in Matlock, Derbyshire, Green grew up in the same block of flats in Wimbledon, south-west London, as the future Pirates. He devoured skiffle and early rock'n'roll, and began his career in 1956 playing in a skiffle trio "The Wayfaring Strangers", formed with his schoolmates Johnny Spence (on bass) and Frank Farley (on drums), which came second in a bands competition to The Quarrymen, an early incarnation of the Beatles. After a stint as the Ramrods, the trio then joined Red-E-Lewis and the Redcaps, who became the Redcaps, backing Cuddly Dudley, when Reddy Lewis left. In 1962, all three then joined Johnny Kidd and the Pirates – formed by Kidd during the 1950s – just after the band had scored a huge hit with Shakin' All Over, with Joe Moretti on lead guitar. Green left to join Billy J. Kramer with The Dakotas in 1964. His ability to play lead and rhythm guitar simultaneously influenced a number of British guitarists to follow, including Pete Townshend and Wilko Johnson, the original guitarist for Dr. Feelgood. Green's song "Oyeh!" was on Dr. Feelgood's debut album, Down by the Jetty; and a song he co-wrote, "Going Back Home" appeared on Dr. Feelgood's 1975 Malpractice and the live album, Stupidity (1976). Green was also a member of the band Shanghai, which released two albums, in 1974 and 1976, other members included, Chuck Bedford (vocals, harmonica, 1974–1975), Pete Kircher (drums, vocals), Mike Le Main (bass, keyboards, 1974–1975), Cliff Bennett of Cliff Bennett and the Rebel Rousers (vocals, 1975–1976), Brian Alterman (guitar, 1975–1976), Pat King (bass, 1975–1976).

Green reformed the Pirates with Farley and Spence in 1976 (Kidd having died in 1966). Over the next five years they became one of the hardest-gigging bands on the road and released four albums: Out of Their Skulls (1977), Skull Wars (1978), Happy Birthday Rock'n'Roll (1979) and the ten-inch A Fistful of Dubloons (1981). Green played the Fender Telecaster Custom produced in 1972 as his main guitar.

Green was also a member of the band Shanghai, which released two albums, in 1974 and 1976, and supported Status Quo on their Blue for You tour. Together with Quo member Alan Lancaster he wrote four songs recorded by Status Quo.

In the 1980s and 1990s, Green played with, amongst others, Bryan Ferry, Van Morrison, Paul McCartney, Robert Plant and Lemmy, as well as the Pirates, with whom he continued to gig well into the 2000s. His other notable gigs included playing guitar for Van Morrison on the Pyramid Stage at the Glastonbury Festival in 2005, and with David Gilmour and Paul McCartney at the latter's return to the Cavern Club in support of his Run Devil Run album in 1999.

In his spare time he taught guitar privately, as well as at various local schools.

In 1990, Green played guitar with Lemmy and the Upsetters on their "Blue Suede Shoes" / "Paradise" single. The A-side was originally recorded for a charity album, and Green wrote the B-side with Motörhead's Lemmy Kilmister for this occasional Upsetters project.

From 1999 to 2008, Green performed regularly with the Van Morrison band. He played guitar on 1999's Back on Top and he appeared on his other studio albums up until he was on five of the tracks on Van Morrison's 2008 album, Keep It Simple.

In 2007, he recorded a six track mini-album, Cutthroat and Dangerous in Finland with the Finnish rock'n'roll trio, Doctor's Order.

In February 2004, while on stage with Bryan Ferry in Auckland, New Zealand, Green suffered a cardiac arrest. His life was saved by two doctors in the crowd and following his return to England and recovery he carried on playing. He suffered kidney problems in February 2009, partly connected with his earlier heart problem.

== Death ==
Mick Green died of heart failure on 11 January 2010 in King George Hospital, Ilford, Essex. His wife Karen, sons Lloyd and Brad and daughter-in-law Hannah were at his side. In light of his death, The Pirates disbanded.

On 27 November 2010, the Mick Green tribute gig was held at the 100 Club and featured the Animals and the Wilko Johnson Band. Fellow Pirate shipmate and close friend Johnny Spence closed the evening together with Mick's two sons (Brad on guitar and Lloyd on bass) performing several of the Pirates' back catalogue. His son Lloyd Green now plays bass guitar in critically acclaimed Blues rock band The Milk Men.
