= Steve Walwyn =

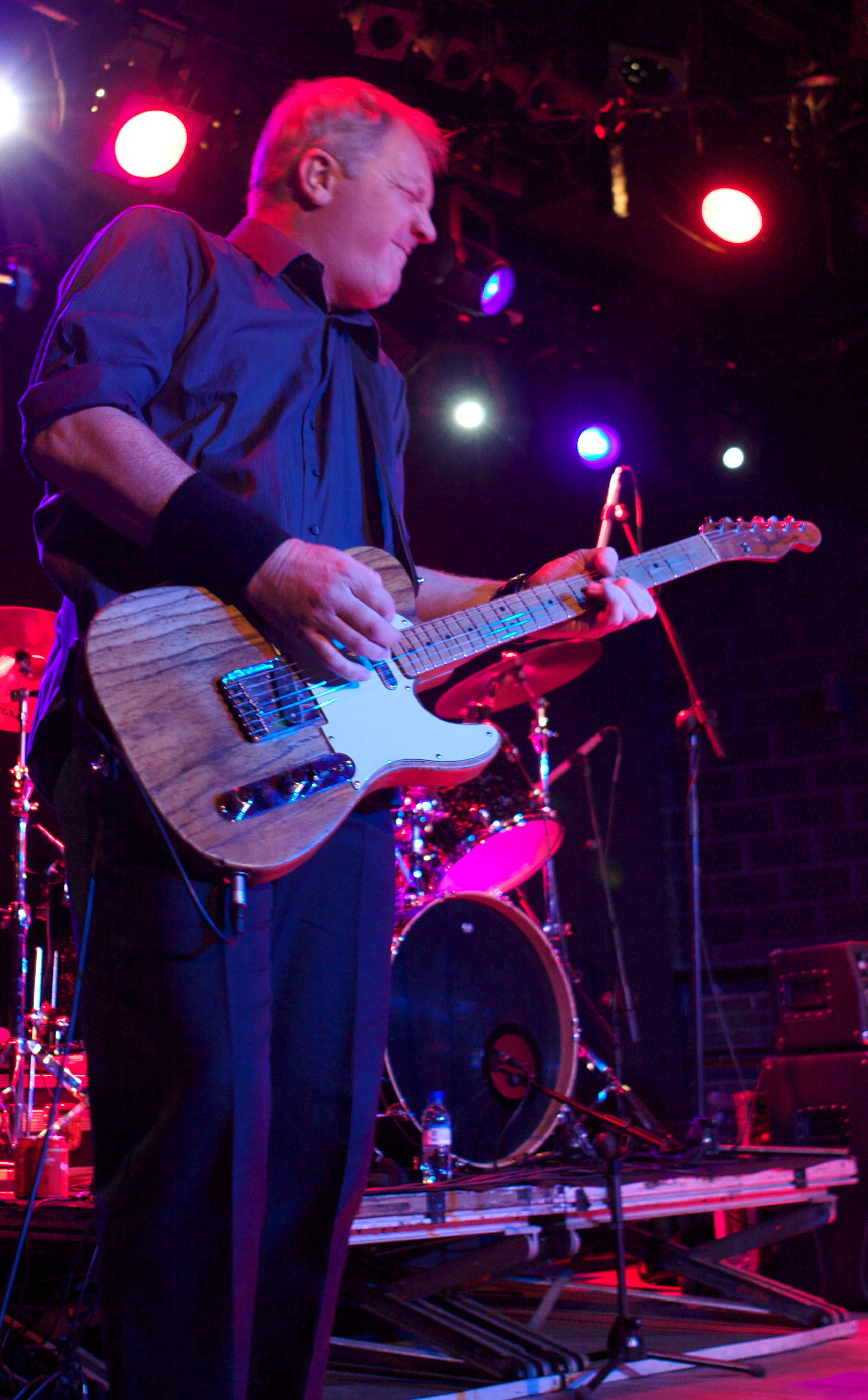
- Steve Walwyn in Barcelona 2009

Background information
- Born: Stephen Martin Walwyn; 8 June 1956 (age 70); Southam, Warwickshire, England
- Genres: Blues rock, R&B
- Occupations: Musician, songwriter
- Instruments: Guitar, slide guitar, bass guitar, mandolin, piano, harmonica
- Years active: 1978–present
- Labels: Grand, Avatar

Stephen Martin Walwyn (born 8 June 1956 in Southam, Warwickshire, England) is an English rhythm and blues guitarist, best known for his playing with Dr. Feelgood, but who has also played with Eddie and the Hot Rods, Steve Marriott and the DTs, the Roger Chapman Band, the Big Town Playboys and his own band Steve Walwyn and Friends.

Walwyn (after 32 years in Dr Feelgood) then joined up with Horace Panter (42 years in The Specials) and Ted Duggan (from Badfinger, The Beat and The Selecter) in The Dirt Road Band, touring from 5 March 2022.

== Early career ==
Walwyn states his inspiration to become a guitarist was Rory Gallagher's album Live in Europe. Although he did not start to learn to play the guitar until he was 17, he formed his first band, Hands Off, whilst still at school. Upon leaving school he worked for the Civil Service for four years, whilst still playing with Hands Off.

In 1978, he became a professional musician when he was asked to join a band performing under two different names. Cupid's Inspiration were a pop-act, who had had a No 4 single with "Yesterday has Gone" and a No 33 with "My World", both in 1968, but subsequent records had failed, and they grew tired of the "one hit wonder" tag. The band had moved to Leamington Spa and were also writing their own rock songs, which they performed as '4 Wheel Drive', a name they soon changed to 'Chevy'. As 'Chevy' they toured supporting bands such as Alvin Lee, Hawkwind and Gillan. As well as recording one of their two BBC in Concert Programmes, whilst Walwyn was a member, Chevy also issued three singles: "Too Much Loving"/"See the Light", "The Taker"/"Life on the Run" and "Just Another Day"/"Rock On" and one album, The Taker, in September 1980. The album received good critical reviews, but did not sell well.

In 1982, Walwyn briefly joined The Mosquitos, with Brian Helicopter, and recorded their only single, "Somethin' Outta Nothin'", before joining Leicester band The DTs. Whilst with the DTs Walwyn appeared on three albums, The DTs, Shakin' and Stirred and Messing with the Blues. Steve Marriott, formerly of the Small Faces and Humble Pie, saw The DTs in 1987, and was so impressed he asked them to join him, forming the band Steve Marriott with the DTs, who also performed as the Steve Marriott Band, until Marriott left to rejoin Peter Frampton in the US in 1989.

== Dr. Feelgood ==
Both the DTs, and the Steve Marriott Band, had been the support act for Dr. Feelgood on several occasions, and the Feelgoods had admired his guitar playing. On the departure of Feelgood's guitarist, Gordon Russell, in early 1989, Lee Brilleaux asked Walwyn to audition. He was accepted at the audition and joined the band almost immediately.

Walwyn fitted in with "surprising ease", and after just two warm-up gigs, was thrown in at the deep end, playing The Town & Country Club, a gig which was filmed for TV and issued as the LP Live in London. After another European tour, the band recorded their album Primo, during the recording of which, bassist Phil Mitchell left and was replaced by Dave Bronze. In 1992, Walwyn and Bronze wrote several tracks for the new album, The Feelgood Factor, during the recording of which, in early 1993, Brilleaux was confirmed as having lymphoma. The band were laid off while Brilleaux received chemotherapy. Walwyn was part of the briefly reformed band, for Brilleaux's last two concerts, in January 1994, which were recorded and issued as Down at the Doctors, shortly after Brilleaux's death, on 7 April 1994.

During the hiatus, Walwyn played with Eddie and the Hot Rods, The Roger Chapman Band and the Big Town Playboys.

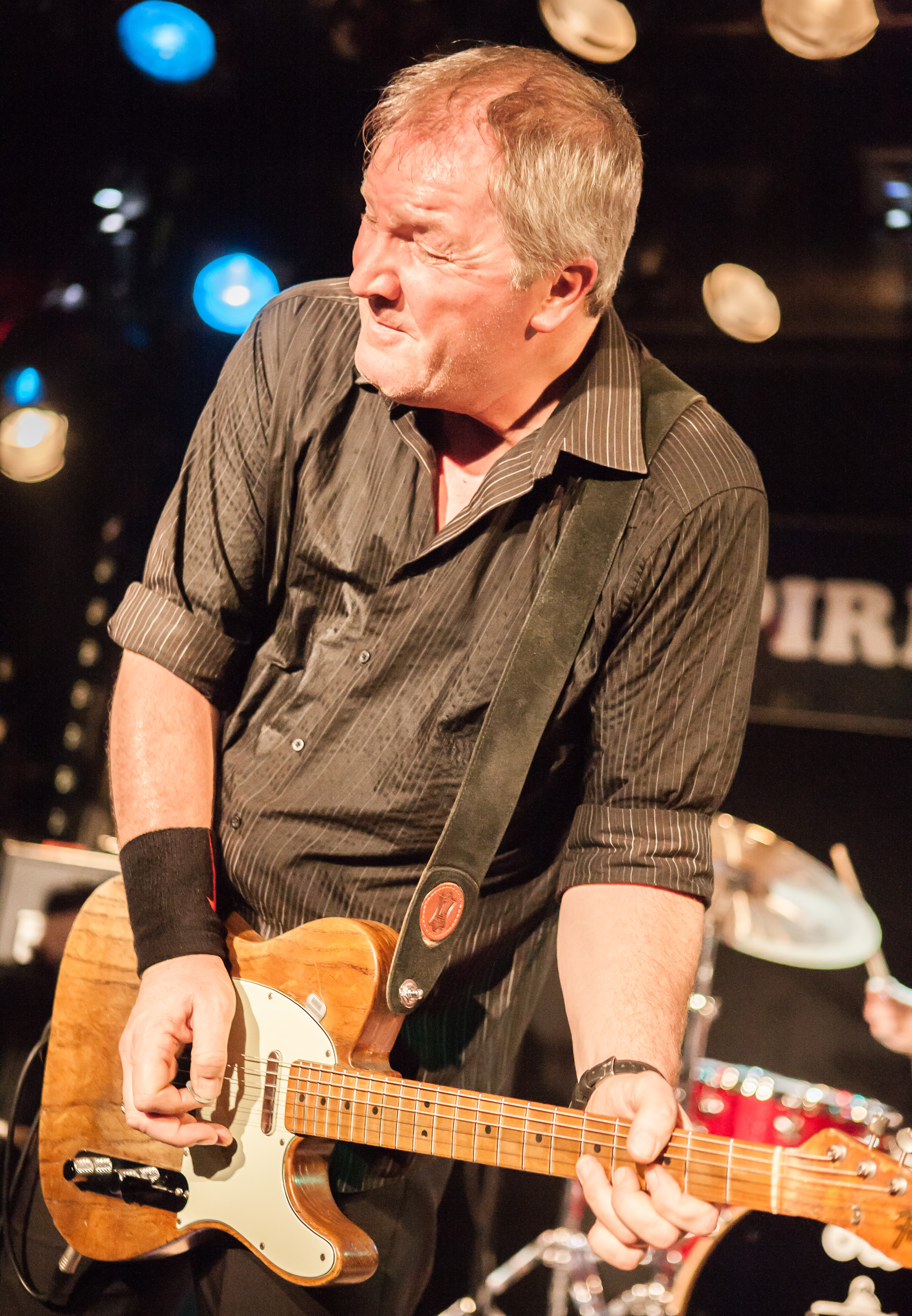
Steve Walwyn in Belgium 2009

A year after Brilleaux's death, the Feelgood's manager Chris Fenwick was still being asked if the band would reform, so he asked drummer Kevin Morris to consider this. Morris approached Walwyn and Mitchell, who were both up for it, but they had trouble finding a vocalist until they auditioned Pete Gage, who fitted in well. They went back on tour in summer 1995 and recorded On the Road Again including some more Walwyn and Bronze compositions, which was released in August 1996. In 1999, Robert Kane took over as vocalist, and the band released Chess Masters in 2000 and Repeat Prescription in 2006. In 2021, Walwyn quit and Gordon Russell returned to the band.

== Side projects ==
Walwyn has played numerous sessions for other artists, such as Lawrence, appearing on his Denim on Ice album.

In the 1990s, Walwyn formed a side project, known variously as 'The GBs' or 'The Steve Walwyn Band', with Craig Rhind (bass) and Chas Chaplin (drums) both former members of the DTs, and now also plays as Steve Walwyn and Friends, "a band dedicated to getting back to the roots of Rhythm and Blues".

In 2013, Walwyn restarted a music venue in Leamington Spa, 'Kelly's', which used to be in Court Street but is now held monthly at St. Patrick's Club, usually on the first Wednesday of the month. In the first year, Walwyn appeared there with The Friends band, The Mosquitos, The DTs, Chevy, Mike Sanchez and others.

Walwyn's debut solo album Instinct To Survive was released on 8 June 2015 on Baby Grand Records. The album contained a selection of self-written songs and instrumentals, and included the musicians Martin Cure (backing vocals), Craig Rhind (bass), Ted Duggan and Chas Chaplin (both drums).

== Personal life ==
Walwyn is married with three children, and still lives in Warwickshire. His interests include cricket, photography and woodworking. He is also a keen cyclist, undertaking charity rides, such as Land's End to John o' Groats, once on behalf of the Down's Syndrome Association. and again for The Guide Dogs for the Blind Association. in 1986

== Album discography ==
With Chevy

- The Taker (1980)

With The DTs

- The DTs ?
- Shakin' and Stirred (1983)
- Live at JB's (1986)
- Messing with the Blues (1983) ?

With Steve Marriott and The DTs

- Sing The Blues Live CD 1988
- Live in Lindau 1988 (US Bootleg)

With Steve Marriott

- 30 Seconds to Midnite (1989)

With Steve Marriott and the Official Receivers

- Steve Marriott and the Official Receivers (2000) (2 Tracks with The DTs)

With Big Town Playboys

- Hip Joint (1994)

With Denim

- Denim on Ice (1999)

With The GBs

- Kelly's Heroes (1994)

With Dr Feelgood

- Live in London (1990)
- Stupidity Plus (Live 1976–1990) (1991) Compilation
- Primo (1991)
- The Feelgood Factor (1993)
- Down at the Doctors (1994)
- On The Road Again (1996)
- Twenty Five Years of Dr. Feelgood (1997) Compilation
- Chess Masters (2000)
- Speeding Thru Europe (2003)
- Repeat Prescription (2006)

Solo

- Instinct To Survive (2015)
