= Baby Jane (Dr. Feelgood song) =

1977 cover of a 1969 song by Otis Clay

Single by Otis Clay
- B-side: "You Hurt Me for the Last Time"
- Released: 1969
- Length: 2:20
- Label: Dakar Records
- Songwriters: John Bishop, Michael M. Davis, Harold 'Hal' Nesbitt, Bernard Reed, Lee Simmons, Jerry Wilson
- Producer: Willie Henderson

"Baby Jane"

Single by Dr. Feelgood

from the album Be Seeing You
- B-side: "Looking Back"
- Released: November 1977
- Recorded: 1977
- Genre: Rock and roll, pub rock
- Length: 2:58
- Label: United Artists Records - UP 36332
- Songwriters: John Bishop, Michael M. Davis, Harold 'Hal' Nesbitt, Bernard Reed, Lee Simmons, Jerry Wilson
- Producer: Nick Lowe

Dr. Feelgood singles chronology
"She's a Windup" (1977)	"Baby Jane" (1977)	"Down at the Doctors" (1978)

"Baby Jane" is a song recorded by soul singer Otis Clay in 1969 for Dakar Records. Dr. Feelgood covered the track in 1977, it first appeared on Be Seeing You, a Dr. Feelgood album released in September that year.

"Baby Jane" was also released as a single in the UK in November 1977.

The song was written by Bishop, Nesbitt, Reed, Simmons and Wilson (except from Lee Simmons all other co-writers were members of legendary funk band "Pieces of Peace", so it is likely that Pieces of Peace were the backing band for Otis Clay). "Baby Jane" was produced by Nick Lowe, the song was Dr. Feelgood's eighth single. The b-side of the record, "Looking Back", was penned by Johnny "Guitar" Watson. (Not to be confused with "Johnny Guitar"; Dr. Feelgood's guitarist from 1981 to 1983)

The record did not make the UK Singles Chart. A 12" vinyl was also issued, which included a third track, a live recording of the B.B. King penned, "You Upset Me Baby". The live take was recorded at the Paddocks, Canvey Island, by Vic Maile with the Maison Rouge Mobile, on 10 June 1977. The cover shown (right) is from the 12" release, as the 7" did not have a picture sleeve.

On 20 September 1977, Dr. Feelgood recorded it for a Peel Session on BBC Radio 1. Their set list included "Baby Jane", along with "You Upset Me Baby", "She's a Windup" and "99.5".

A version of "Baby Jane" was also included in Dr. Feelgood's 1979 live album, As It Happens, and on a number of their compilation albums, such as Singles - The UA Years. The song was still a staple of Dr. Feelgood's live repertoire in 2010.
