= Malpractice (Dr. Feelgood album) =

Studio album by Dr. Feelgood
- Released: October 1975
- Studio: Olympic Studios & Pye Studios, London
- Genre: Rhythm and blues, rock and roll, pub rock
- Length: 37:32
- Label: United Artists (UK); Columbia (US)
- Producer: Vic Maile

Dr. Feelgood chronology
| Down by the Jetty (1975) | Malpractice (1975) | Stupidity (1976) |

Professional ratings
Review scores
| Source | Rating |
|---|---|
| AllMusic | 4.5/5 stars |
| Christgau's Record Guide | B |
| The Rolling Stone Album Guide | 3/5 stars |

Malpractice is the second album by English rock band Dr. Feelgood, released in October 1975.

Malpractice saw Dr. Feelgood break into the UK Top 20, the success of the release a gauge of a change in the musical climate. With their drainpipe suits, short hair, and surly demeanour, they were as influential as any at the inception of punk rock.

The album was re-issued in August 1990 on the Grand Records label in both vinyl and CD formats.

== Release ==
Malpractice reached number 17 on the UK Albums Chart in November 1975, and remained on the chart for six weeks. It was their first recording to chart, and appeared almost two years before their first single to do so on the corresponding UK Singles Chart – "Sneakin' Suspicion" (June 1977).

== Track listing ==
1. "I Can Tell" (Ellas McDaniel, Samuel F. Smith) 2:46
2. "Going Back Home" (Mick Green, Wilko Johnson) 4:00
3. "Back in the Night" (Wilko Johnson) 3:18
4. "Another Man" (Wilko Johnson) 2:55
5. "Rolling and Tumbling" (McKinley Morganfield) 3:12
6. "Don't Let Your Daddy Know" (Wilko Johnson) 2:57
7. "Watch Your Step" (Bobby Parker) 3:23
8. "Don't You Just Know It" (Huey "Piano" Smith, Johnny Vincent) 3:49
9. "Riot in Cell Block No. 9" (Jerry Leiber, Mike Stoller) 3:40
10. "Because You're Mine" (Wilko Johnson, Nick Lowe, Sparks) 4:54
11. "You Shouldn't Call the Doctor (If You Can't Afford the Bills)" (Wilko Johnson) 2:36

== Personnel ==
Dr. Feelgood

- Lee Brilleaux - guitar, harmonica, lead vocals
- Wilko Johnson - guitar, backing vocals
- The Big Figure - drums
- John B. Sparks - bass

with:

- Bob Andrews - piano, keyboards, saxophone

Technical

- Doug Bennett - engineer, advisor
- Keith Morris - photography

== Charts ==
=== Weekly charts ===
Weekly chart performance for Malpractice
| Chart (2025) | Peak position |
|---|---|
| Croatian International Albums (HDU) | 40 |
| Hungarian Physical Albums (MAHASZ) | 31 |
