= As Long as the Price Is Right =

Single by Dr. Feelgood

from the album As It Happens
- B-side: "Down at the Doctors" (live)
- Released: April 1979
- Recorded: 1979
- Genre: Rock and roll, pub rock
- Length: 3:54
- Label: United Artists Records - UP 36506
- Songwriter: Larry Wallis
- Producer: Dr. Feelgood

Dr. Feelgood singles chronology
"Milk and Alcohol" (1979)	"As Long as the Price Is Right" (1979)	"Put Him Out of Your Mind" (1979)

"As Long as the Price Is Right" is a song by the band Dr. Feelgood. From a live recording made in 1979, it appeared on their live album, As It Happens, which was released in May that year. It was recorded at 'The Town House Studios'.

"As Long as the Price Is Right" was also issued as a single in the UK in April 1979. It reached number 40 in the UK Singles Chart, and spent six weeks in the listing. Written by Larry Wallis, and produced by Dr. Feelgood, the song was Dr. Feelgood's fifth hit single. The B-side of the record, is a live version of "Down at the Doctors", which was penned by Mickey Jupp.

There were four different versions of the 7" single released at the same time. As well as the traditional black vinyl (catalogue reference UP 36506), discs were also issued in blue (cat. ref. XUP 365606); brown (cat.ref. YUP 36506); and purple (cat. ref. ZUP 36506) vinyl variants, with slightly differing picture sleeves to reflect the colour theme and featuring different denomination notes (£5, £10 and £20) stuffed into the bra. The picture sleeve was designed by John Pasche. The original studio version of the song first appeared on Dr. Feelgood's 1977 album, Be Seeing You.

"As Long as the Price Is Right" was later included in Dr. Feelgood's 1989's compilation album, Singles - The UA Years.

The song was later played by the Pink Fairies, with Wallis on guitar, in their album Previously Unreleased.
