= Bert DeCoteaux =

- Also known as: Bert de Coteaux; Bert Decoteaux
- Born: Norbert Montague De Coteau Jr. June 12, 1929; New York City, U.S.
- Died: July 6, 2005 (aged 76) New York City
- Genres: Soul, funk, rock
- Occupations: Arranger, record producer, songwriter
- Years active: 1950s – 1990s

Norbert Montague De Coteau Jr. (June 12, 1929 – July 6, 2005), usually known professionally as Bert DeCoteaux or de Coteaux, was an American arranger, record producer and songwriter, known for his soul and funk recordings in the 1960s and 1970s for artists including The Main Ingredient, B. B. King, and Sister Sledge.

== Biography ==
His father, also named Norbert De Coteau, was born in Grenada and in the 1920s settled in Brooklyn, where his twin sons, Norbert Jr. and Denis, were born. Denis DeCoteau later became musical director for the San Francisco Ballet. Norbert Jr. attended the High School of Music & Art, and then the Juilliard School, where he studied composition and arranging, as well as playing bass in local bands and orchestras. He then joined the US Army, where he stayed for eleven years. During that time he opened a school of jazz in Japan, and worked as a liaison officer in the army's music department.

He returned to New York in the late 1950s, and began working as a session musician and arranger for Eartha Kitt and others under his birth name of Norbert De Coteau. Adopting the working name of Bert DeCoteaux, he then worked in partnership with Clyde Otis of Mercury Records, and in the early 1960s the pair set up Argon Productions, where DeCoteaux produced records by Gloria Parker, Patti Young, Jimmy Miller and others.

Over the next few years, he arranged soul and dance records - many now regarded as Northern soul classics - for a variety of record labels, and 1967 put together a new group, The Soul Finders, which included musicians Bernard Purdie and Chuck Rainey, and singers Valerie Simpson and Lesley Miller. He also arranged recordings by Irene Reid and Florence Ballard, among others, before being recruited by producer Bill Szymczyk to contribute an arrangement to B. B. King's recording of "The Thrill Is Gone". The recording earned Grammy awards in 1970 for both King and DeCoteaux. Szymczyk used DeCoteaux as arranger on several later projects, including albums by rock bands the James Gang and Ford Theatre, and gave him the nickname 'Super Charts'.

By the early 1970s, DeCoteaux worked for RCA Records as an in-house arranger, and also worked on jingles. His main interest at the time was as arranger, producer and occasional songwriter for The Main Ingredient, whose first three albums he arranged. He worked closely on group and other projects with band member Tony Silvester. In 1975, DeCoteaux arranged and co-produced the first album by Sister Sledge, Circle of Love, including their first hit, "Love Don't Go Through No Changes On Me," written by bassist Haras Fyre (pen name: Patrick Grant) and Gwen Guthrie. "Bert" also worked on many other albums, including those by Millie Jackson, Z.Z. Hill, Ben E. King, Bobby McFerrin, Diana Ross, Marlena Shaw, Roy Ayers, and The Manhattans, as well as recordings by rock artists Kevin Ayers and Dr. Feelgood.

DeCoteaux remained active as an arranger and producer into the 1990s. He died in New York City in 2005 at the age of 76.
