= She's a Windup =

Single by Dr. Feelgood

from the album Be Seeing You
- B-side: "Hi-Rise"
- Released: September 1977
- Recorded: 1977
- Genre: Rhythm and blues, pub rock
- Length: 2:01
- Label: United Artists Records - UP 36304
- Songwriter(s): Brilleaux, Martin, Mayo, Sparks
- Producer(s): Nick Lowe

Dr. Feelgood singles chronology
"Sneakin' Suspicion" (1977)	"She's a Windup" (1977)	"Baby Jane" (1977)

"She's a Windup" is a song by the band Dr. Feelgood. The track was recorded in 1977, and appeared on Be Seeing You, an album by Dr. Feelgood that was released in September that year.

"She's a Windup" was also released as a single in the UK in September 1977. Written by all the band members, and produced by Nick Lowe, the song was Dr. Feelgood's second hit single. The B-side of the record, "Hi-Rise", was penned solely by Gypie Mayo.

It reached number 34 in the UK Singles Chart, and spent five weeks in the listing. A 12" single (12 UP 36304), issued at the same time as the 7" single, had an additional track on the B-side, a live version of "Homework". The cover shown is the original 12", with a "rubber stamp" logo in the corner. The 7" was released in a plain sleeve.

On 20 September 1977 Dr. Feelgood recorded a Peel Session on BBC Radio 1. Their set list included "She's A Wind Up", along with "You Upset Me Baby", "Baby Jane" and "99.5". A version of "She's A Wind Up" was also included in Dr. Feelgood's 1979 live album, As It Happens, and on a number of their compilation albums, such as Singles - The UA Years.
