= Roxette (song) =

1974 song by Dr. Feelgood

- Cover of the 1974 French single

Single by Dr. Feelgood

from the album Down by the Jetty
- B-side: "(Get Your Kicks On) Route 66"
- Released: November 1974
- Recorded: 1974
- Genre: Pub rock; R&B; blues rock
- Length: 2:53
- Label: United Artists
- Songwriter(s): Wilko Johnson
- Producer(s): Vic Maile

Dr. Feelgood singles chronology
"Roxette" (1974)	"She Does It Right" (1975)

Official audio
- "Roxette" (2006 Remaster) on YouTube

"Roxette (Live)"
- Cover of the 1976 Belgium single

Single by Dr. Feelgood

from the album Stupidity
- B-side: "Keep It Out of Sight"
- Released: September 1976
- Recorded: 1976
- Genre: Pub rock; R&B; blues rock
- Length: 2:54
- Label: United Artists
- Songwriter(s): Wilko Johnson
- Producer(s): Dr. Feelgood

Dr. Feelgood singles chronology
"Back in the Night" (1975)	"Roxette (Live)" (1976)	"Sneakin' Suspicion" (1977)

"Roxette" is the debut single by the band Dr. Feelgood released in 1974, from their 1975 debut album Down by the Jetty.

== Release ==
"Roxette" was issued as a single in the UK in November 1974. It failed to reach the UK Singles Chart. It was written by Wilko Johnson and produced by Vic Maile. The B-side of the record is a cover of "(Get Your Kicks On) Route 66".

Later, in September 1976, a live recording of the song was issued by the band as a single, with a live recording of "Keep It Out of Sight" on the B-side. The live recording of the track also appeared on Dr. Feelgood's 1976 live album, Stupidity.

"Roxette" was also later included on Dr. Feelgood's 1997's compilation album, Twenty Five Years of Dr. Feelgood.

Johnson re-recorded the song with Norman Watt-Roy for his 2013 album, Faith and Grace, performing it live on a few occasions on Watt-Roy's tour in October 2013.

The Swedish duo Roxette took their name from this song.
