= Sneakin' Suspicion =

Studio album by Dr. Feelgood
- Released: May 1977
- Studio: Rockfield
- Genres: Rhythm and blues, rock and roll, pub rock
- Label: United Artists - UAS 30075
- Producer: Bert de Coteaux

Dr. Feelgood chronology
Stupidity (1976)	Sneakin' Suspicion (1977)	Be Seeing You (1977)

Professional ratings
Review scores
Source	Rating
AllMusic	4.0/5 stars
The Rolling Stone Album Guide	2/5 stars

Sneakin' Suspicion is the fourth album by the English band Dr. Feelgood, released in 1977. During recording of Sneakin' Suspicion, the band nearly disbanded following the departure of guitarist, songwriter and focal point, Wilko Johnson. The album reached number 10 in the UK Albums Chart in June 1977, and remained in that chart for six weeks. It also spawned their first single to enter the corresponding UK Singles Chart - "Sneakin' Suspicion".

Despite its thriving British success, Dr. Feelgood was unable to find an audience in the United States. After Sneakin' Suspicion they did not release another record in the U.S. until 1980.

== Track listing ==
All tracks composed by Wilko Johnson; except where indicated

1. "Sneakin' Suspicion" (3:50)
2. "Paradise" (4:03)
3. "Nothin' Shakin' (But the Leaves on the Trees)" (Cirino Colacrai, Eddie Fontaine, Johnny Gluck, Diane Lampert) (3:28)
4. "Time and the Devil" (2:59)
5. "Lights Out" (Seth David, Mac Rebennack) (1:54)
6. "Lucky Seven" (Lew Lewis) (2:46)
7. "All My Love" (3:47)
8. "You'll Be Mine" (Willie Dixon) (3:17)
9. "Walking on the Edge" (3:39)
10. "Hey Mama, Keep Your Big Mouth Shut" (Ellas McDaniel)

== Personnel ==
Dr. Feelgood

- Lee Brilleaux – vocals, guitar, harmonica, slide guitar
- Wilko Johnson – guitar, backing vocals, lead vocals (2,4)
- John B. Sparks – bass guitar, backing vocals
- The Big Figure – drums, percussion, backing vocals

with:

- Tim Hinkley – keyboards

Technical

- Bert de Coteaux – producer
- Pat Moran – audio engineer
- John Dent – mastering
- Paul Henry – design
- Gered Mankowitz – photography

== Charts ==
Weekly chart performance for Sneakin' Suspicion
Chart (2025)	Peak position
Hungarian Physical Albums (MAHASZ)	24
