= Down by the Jetty =

Studio album by Dr. Feelgood
- Released: January 1975
- Recorded: 8 June – 27 November 1974
- Studio: Rockfield Studios, Monmouth
- Genre: British R&B; pub rock
- Length: 41:25
- Label: United Artists
- Producer: Vic Maile

Dr. Feelgood chronology
Down by the Jetty (1975)	Malpractice (1975)

Professional ratings
Review scores
Source	Rating
AllMusic	4.5/5 stars
Mojo	4/5 stars
Q	4/5 stars
The Rolling Stone Album Guide	1.5/5 stars

Down by the Jetty is the debut album by English rock band Dr. Feelgood, released in January 1975.

The band's Johnny Kidd & the Pirates-influenced originals ("Keep It Out of Sight") appear alongside covers material like "Bonie Moronie" and "Tequila".

The album was re-released as a double CD in 2006 (EMI 0946 363951 2 8).

== Legacy ==
Paul Weller and Bob Geldof have acknowledged the influence of Down by the Jetty, as have Blondie, the Ramones and Richard Hell, who were introduced to the album by Blondie's drummer Clem Burke. In 1976, prior to being signed, Paul Weller's band the Jam demoed a cover of "Cheque Book". A copy of the album is also glimpsed on the sleeve of the 1985 album Our Favourite Shop by his later band the Style Council.

In 2006, Uncut magazine listed the album at number 87 on its list of the 100 greatest debut albums.

== Track listing ==
All tracks composed by Wilko Johnson; except where indicated

1. "She Does It Right" – 3:25
2. "Boom Boom" (John Lee Hooker) – 2:45
3. "The More I Give" – 3:27
4. "Roxette" – 2:58
5. "One Weekend" – 2:17
6. "That Ain't the Way to Behave" – 3:58
7. "I Don't Mind" – 2:37
8. "Twenty Yards Behind" – 2:13
9. "Keep It Out of Sight" – 3:02
10. "All Through the City" – 3:04
11. "Cheque Book" (Mickey Jupp) – 4:08
12. "Oyeh!" (Mick Green) – 2:32
13. "Bony Moronie" / "Tequila" (Larry Williams) / (Danny Flores) – live recording – 4:50

=== Re-release ===
CD 1 The original album remastered, in mono, with five bonus tracks. All tracks composed by Wilko Johnson; except where indicated.

1. "She Does It Right"
2. "Boom Boom" (Hooker)
3. "The More I Give"
4. "Roxette"
5. "One Weekend"
6. "That Ain't the Way to Behave"
7. "I Don't Mind"
8. "Twenty Yards Behind"
9. "Keep It Out of Sight"
10. "All Through the City"
11. "Cheque Book" (Jupp)
12. "Oyeh!" (Green)
13. "Bonie Moronie" / "Tequila" (Williams) / (Flores) – (Live)
14. "(Get Your Kicks On) Route 66" (Bobby Troup)
15. "I'm a Hog for You Baby" (Jerry Leiber, Mike Stoller)
16. "Stupidity" (Solomon Burke)
17. "She Said Alright"
18. "Oyeh!" – alternative version

CD 2 The original album and bonus tracks as above (excluding "Route 66"), remastered in stereo, using several alternative versions, plus six more bonus tracks. All tracks composed by Wilko Johnson; except where indicated.

1. "She Does It Right"
2. "Boom Boom" (Hooker)
3. "The More I Give" – alternative version
4. "Roxette"
5. "One Weekend"
6. "That Ain't the Way to Behave"
7. "I Don't Mind" – alternative version
8. "Twenty Yards Behind" – alternative version
9. "Keep It Out of Sight"
10. "All Through the City"
11. "Cheque Book" (Jupp)
12. "Oyeh!" (Green)
13. "I'm a Hog for You Baby" (Leiber, Stoller)
14. "Stupidity" (Burke)
15. "She Said Alright"
16. "Oyeh!" – alternative version
17. "Tore Down" (Sonny Thompson) – (Live)
18. "Don't You Just Know It" (Huey "Piano" Smith, Johnny Vincent) – (Live)
19. "My Babe" (Willie Dixon) – (Live)
20. "The More I Give" – (Live)
21. "It's My Own Fault Darlin'" (B.B. King, Jules Taub) – (Live)
22. "Bonie Moronie" / "Tequila" (Williams) / (Flores) – (Live)
23. "Rock Me Baby" (B. B. King, Joe Josea) – (Live)

== Personnel ==
Dr. Feelgood

- Lee Brilleaux – lead vocals (1, 3–5, 7, 9–13), guitar, harmonica, slide guitar
- Wilko Johnson – guitar, piano, backing and lead (2, 6, 8) vocals
- John B. Sparks – bass
- John Martin, aka "The Big Figure" – drums

with:

- Bob Andrews – organ (3), saxophone (13)
- Brinsley Schwarz – saxophone (13)

Technical

- Vic Maile – producer
- Dave Charles, Kingsley Ward, Pat Moran – engineers

== Charts ==
=== Weekly charts ===
Weekly chart performance for Down by the Jetty
Chart (2025)	Peak position
Croatian International Albums (HDU)	22
Hungarian Physical Albums (MAHASZ)	30
