= Down at the Doctors =

Single by Dr. Feelgood

from the album Private Practice
- B-side: "Take a Tip"
- Released: September 1978
- Recorded: 1978
- Genre: Blues rock, pub rock
- Length: 3:19
- Label: United Artists Records - UP 36444
- Songwriter(s): Mickey Jupp
- Producer(s): Richard Gottehrer

Dr. Feelgood singles chronology
"Baby Jane" (1977)	"Down at the Doctors" (1978)	"Milk and Alcohol" (1979)

"Down at the Doctors" is a song by the band Dr. Feelgood. The track was recorded in 1978, and appeared on Private Practice, an album by Dr. Feelgood that was released in October that year.

"Down at the Doctors" was also released as a single in the UK in September 1978, a month prior to the album's issue. Written by Mickey Jupp, and produced by Richard Gottehrer, the song was Dr. Feelgood's third hit single and continues to be played by the band. The cover photograph was taken at 33 Weymouth Street, London.

It reached number 48 in the UK Singles Chart, and spent five weeks in the listing.

The band re-recorded the title live for the B-side of their April 1979 single release, "As Long as the Price Is Right".

In addition to Private Practice, versions of the song appear on numerous other Dr. Feelgood albums, including Casebook, Case History, Live in London, Stupidity Plus, Finely Tuned and the eponymous album Down at the Doctors; the final album recorded by Lee Brilleaux, in January 1994, shortly before his death. It also appears on most of the band's compilation albums.
