= She Does It Right =

Single by Dr. Feelgood

from the album Down by the Jetty
- B-side: "I Don't Mind"
- Released: March 1975
- Recorded: 1974
- Studio: Rockfield Studios, Monmouth
- Genre: Proto-punk
- Length: 3:28
- Label: United Artists Records - UP 35815
- Songwriter: Wilko Johnson
- Producer: Vic Maile

Dr. Feelgood singles chronology
"Roxette" (1974)	"She Does It Right" (1975)	"Back in the Night" (1975)

Official audio
- "She Does It Right" (2006 remaster) on YouTube

"She Does It Right" is a song by the band Dr. Feelgood, recorded in 1974 and appearing on their debut album, Down by the Jetty. The track was written by Wilko Johnson, and produced by Vic Maile. The song was the band's second UK single release, following their debut "Roxette", in March 1975, but failed to reach the UK Singles Chart. The B-side of the record, "I Don't Mind", was also penned by Johnson.

The song was included in Dr. Feelgood's 1997's compilation album, Twenty Five Years of Dr. Feelgood.

In a 2016 interview with Johnson, Songwriting Magazine described the track as "three and a half minutes of proto-punk heaven." He recorded the song again for his 2017 album I Keep It To Myself: The Best of Wilko Johnson.

The song was covered by American rock duo The Black Keys on their 2026 album Peaches!
