= Private Practice (album) =

Studio album by Dr. Feelgood
- Released: October 1978
- Recorded: 1978
- Studio: Eden Studios, Chiswick
- Genre: Rhythm and blues, rock and roll, pub rock
- Label: United Artists - UAS 30184
- Producer: Richard Gottehrer; Martin Rushent on "Every Kind of Vice"

Dr. Feelgood chronology
Be Seeing You (1977)	Private Practice (1978)	As It Happens (1979)

Professional ratings
Review scores
Source	Rating
AllMusic	2.0/5 stars

Private Practice was the sixth album by Dr. Feelgood, and was released in October 1978. The album spawned the top-ten hit single (the only one of their career) "Milk and Alcohol". Their preceding single release, "Down at the Doctors", which also appeared on Private Practice 's track listing, topped out at number 48 in the same UK Singles Chart.

The album peaked at number 41 in the UK Albums Chart on 7 October 1978, and remained in that chart for five weeks.

== Track listing ==
1. "Down at the Doctors" (Mickey Jupp) (3:19)
2. "Every Kind of Vice" (Lee Brilleaux, Gypie Mayo) (3:27)
3. "Things Get Better" (Eddie Floyd) (2:51)
4. "Milk and Alcohol" (Nick Lowe, Gypie Mayo) (2:55)
5. "Night Time" (Bob Feldman, Jerry Goldstein, Richard Gottehrer) (5:26)
6. "Let's Have a Party" (Jessie Mae Robinson) (2:42)
7. "Take a Tip" (Lee Brilleaux, Gypie Mayo) (4:25)
8. "It Wasn't Me" (Nick Lowe, Gypie Mayo) (3:06)
9. "Greaseball" (Gypie Mayo) (3:55)
10. "Sugar Shaker" (Lee Brilleaux, Gypie Mayo, John B. Sparks) (4:45)

== Personnel ==
Dr. Feelgood

- Lee Brilleaux - vocals, guitar, harmonica
- John B. Sparks - bass guitar, backing vocals
- Gypie Mayo - guitar
- The Big Figure (John Martin) - drums

Technical

- Richard Gottehrer - producer
- Paul Henry - artwork and design
- Aldo Bocca - engineer
- Martin Rushent - producer, mixing
- Gary Edwards - engineer, mixing
- Keith Morris - photography
