= Back in the Night =

Single by Dr. Feelgood

from the album Malpractice
- B-side: "I'm a Man"
- Released: July 1975
- Recorded: 1975
- Genre: Rhythm and blues, pub rock
- Length: 3:18
- Label: United Artists Records - UP 35857
- Songwriter: Wilko Johnson
- Producer: Vic Maile

Dr. Feelgood singles chronology
"She Does It Right" (1975)	"Back in the Night" (1975)	"Roxette (Live)" (1976)

Official audio
- "Back in the Night" on YouTube

"Back in the Night" is a song by the British pub rock band Dr. Feelgood. Recorded in 1975, it appeared on their second album, Malpractice.

"Back in the Night" was also issued as a single in the UK in July 1975. It failed to reach the UK Singles Chart. Written by Wilko Johnson, and produced by Vic Maile, the song was Dr. Feelgood's third single release. The B-side was a live recording of a cover version of "I'm a Man", penned by Bo Diddley.

"Back in the Night" was also later included in Dr. Feelgood's 1997's compilation album, Twenty Five Years of Dr. Feelgood.
