= Pete Gage (singer) =

British blues musician (born 1946)

- Born: 12 February 1946 (age 80); St Mary's Hospital, Paddington, London, England
- Instruments: Vocals, harmonica, piano

Peter Gage (born 12 February 1946, St Mary's Hospital, Paddington, London) is a British blues musician. A vocalist, harmonica player and pianist, Gage is best known for fronting the Jet Harris Band and Dr. Feelgood, although he has also led his own band and has issued solo albums featuring artists such as Gypie Mayo.

== Career ==
Gage's father was a drummer. The younger Gage started his musical career as vocalist and harmonica player in a London band "The Sloane Squares", led by Gwyn Headley, in the mid-1960s. The Sloane Squares were well known for their tight music and live shows, and were supporting Jimi Hendrix when they were spotted by Jet Harris, the former Shadows bass player, who asked them to become his backing band. The Jet Harris single "My Lady" c/w "You Don't Live Twice" (1967) features Pete Gage on vocals.

Gage left Jet Harris in 1968 but continued performing with numerous bands, including London based soul-blues-band The Blazers. He moved to the West Country, joining the Pink Torpedoes from 1988 to 1992. He also sang and played Hammond organ in his own band, the original Pete Gage Band from 1992–1995. The band was also known as the Pete Gage Expression, whose album, Give it With a Feeling was issued in May 1995.

After the death of their frontman Lee Brilleaux, Dr. Feelgood had a year's break before agreeing to audition for a new vocalist/harpist. After an initial audition followed by a studio recording and a photoshoot, Gage joined Dr Feelgood in June 1995. After initial opposition from some long-term fans, "because Lee Brilleaux wasn't there", Gage became accepted. They resumed a heavy touring schedule and Gage recorded their 1996 On the Road Again album. He also appears on their 1997 release Twenty Five Years of Dr. Feelgood.

Whilst with the Feelgoods, Gage recorded a piano-based blues-album Out of Hours, which was recorded in Finland, and released in 1997 by Finnish record company Goofin' Records. The tensions of constant touring in Dr Feelgood mounted, and it was "mutually agreed that Pete would stand down".

Gage left Dr Feelgood in September 1999 to focus on various other projects, the main one being the development of his own blues band The Pete Gage Band in which he leads from the piano and highlights his gritty vocals. This band continues to feature prominently in the pubs and clubs in the South-West of England. He also continued performing with different bands in England, Spain and particularly Finland, where he has a "large and loyal fan base". An offshoot from his current blues band is the Pete Gage Blues Trio, featuring Paul Hartshorn on guitar, Duncan Kingston on double bass, and Pete himself on piano and vocals, playing classic blues standards in a laid-back style. He also spent 12 years from 2000 as the vocalist/frontman for the Mike Hoddinott Blues All-Stars.

In 2010, Gage made an album, Tough Talk (GRCD 6165), recorded and released in Finland. Backed by Finnish band Doctor's Order, (who normally back Johnny Spence, formerly of Johnny Kidd & The Pirates) the album features ex Feelgoods guitarist, and Gages's close friend, the late Gypie Mayo on six tracks. In May 2013 Gage played the Dagenham Roundhouse as part of the Big Blues Jam and reappeared there in September 2013 with the re-united Pink Torpedoes.

== Confusion ==
There are two well-known British musicians called Pete Gage; the other, a guitarist and producer, played with Geno Washington & The Ram Jam Band, Dada, and Vinegar Joe and married Elkie Brooks, before becoming a producer for artists such as Joan Armatrading. Numerous discographies e.g. Allmusic and CD Universe confuse the artists and include both artists' output in the same list.

== Discography ==
- "My Lady" c/w "You Don't Live Twice" – Jet Harris (single, 1967)
- On the Road Again (1996) – Dr. Feelgood – (GRAND 19)
- Twenty Five Years of Dr. Feelgood – Dr. Feelgood – (1997) (GRAND 20)
- Give it With a Feeling – Pete Gage Expression (1995) – (PGE CD 001)
- Out of Hours (1997) (Goofin' Records GRCD 6077)
- Tough Talk (2010) (Goofin' Records GRCD 6165)
- Blues-legged – Jesse Davey & friends (2012) (Bandcamp)
- Left Over Blues (2015) - petegagemusic PG46
- Sweet Hearted Woman (2018)
