= Lee Brilleaux =

English singer (1952–1994)

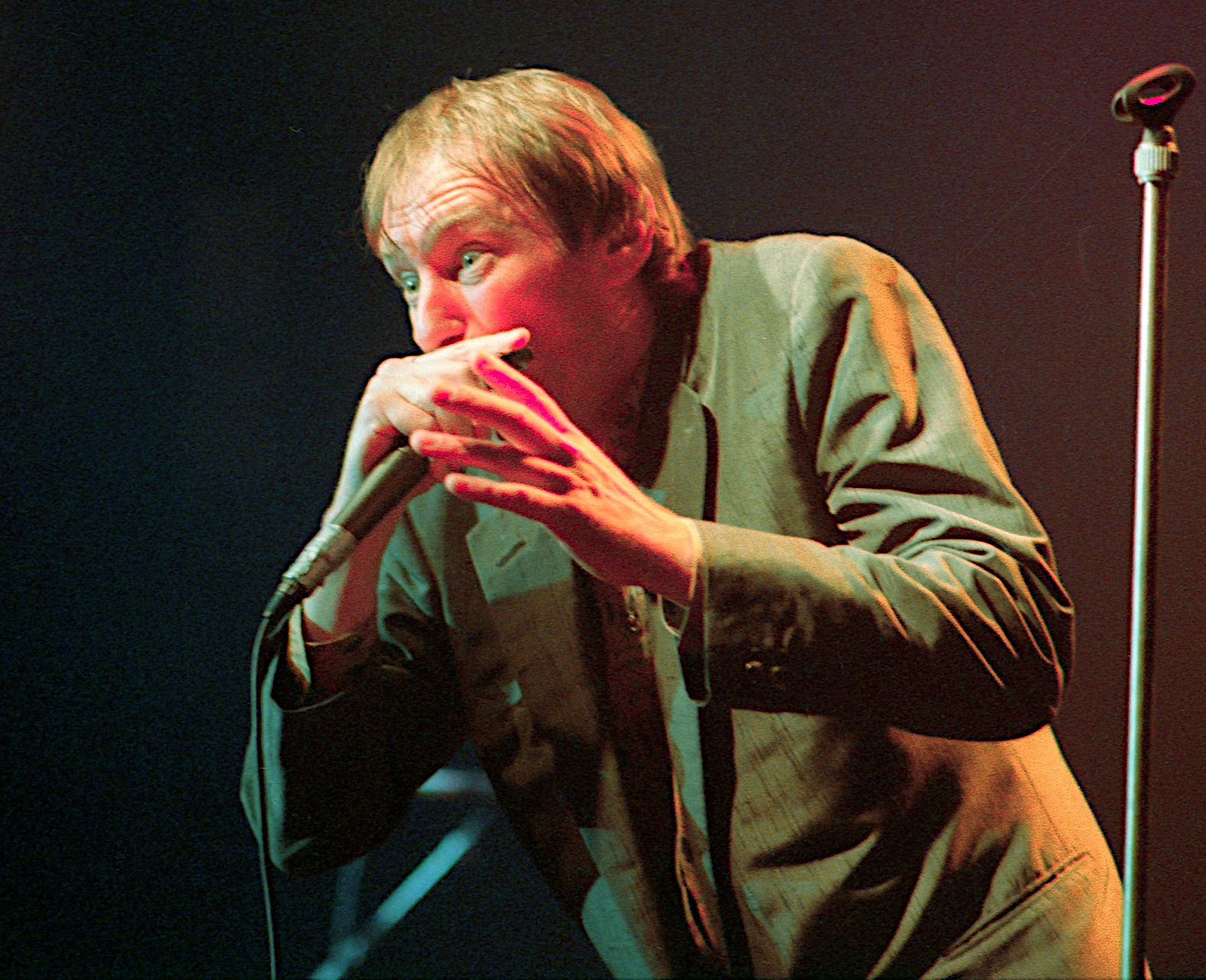
- Brilleaux with Dr. Feelgood in 1992

Background information
- Born: Lee John Collinson; 10 May 1952; Durban, South Africa
- Died: 7 April 1994 (aged 41) Canvey Island, Essex, England
- Genres: Rock, pub rock, R&B
- Occupations: Singer, songwriter, musician
- Instruments: Vocals, guitar, harmonica
- Years active: 1970–1994
- Label: Stiff Records

Lee Brilleaux (born Lee John Collinson; 10 May 1952 – 7 April 1994) was an English rhythm-and-blues singer and musician with the band Dr. Feelgood.

== Early life ==
Lee Brilleaux was born in Durban, South Africa, to English parents, was brought up in Ealing, and moved to Canvey Island with his family when he was 13. After leaving school he was employed as a solicitor's clerk, a job he kept until United Artists signed Dr. Feelgood in 1974.

== Career ==
Brilleaux co-founded Dr. Feelgood with Wilko Johnson in 1971 and was the band's lead singer, harmonica player, and occasional guitarist. According to one obituary: "Brilleaux and Johnson developed a frantic act, often charismatically dressed in dark suits and loose ties, shabby rather than smart. The rough, and almost ruthless, edge which ran through his vocal and harmonica style reflected the character and philosophy of the band." In 1976, Brilleaux helped found Stiff Records, one of the driving forces of the "New Wave" of the mid- to late-1970s, with a loan of £500. Johnson left Dr. Feelgood in April 1977 but Brilleaux continued the band, quickly replacing Johnson with Gypie Mayo on guitar. In 1978, Brilleaux played harmonica on a track on David Coverdale's Northwinds album. By 1984 he was the only remaining founder member of Dr. Feelgood. In 1986, he recorded the album Brilleaux, featuring songs by Johnny Cash, Bobby Charles, Fats Domino and others. His last performance was in January 1994, at the Dr. Feelgood Music Bar in Canvey Island.

== Death ==
Brilleaux died on 7 April 1994 of lymphoma, a month before his 42nd birthday, in his home in Leigh-on-Sea.

== Legacy ==
After a one-year hiatus Dr. Feelgood appointed Pete Gage as their new vocalist.

In 2011, contemporary artist and Dr. Feelgood fan Scott King announced his intention to commemorate Lee Brilleaux by erecting a 300-foot gold-plated statue of the musician on the foreshore in Southend-on-Sea close to the legendary Kursaal where the band played some of their most important gigs. An e-petition was launched to collect signatures in support of the project, which as of 2018 had approximately 1500 signatures.

In 2014, music writer Zoë Howe announced her intention to write Roadrunner, a biography based on Brilleaux's life, including a collection of his life stories and memories, with classic and unseen images. The book reached 100% crowd-funding via Unbound on 18 May 2014. Howe is also the co-author of Looking Back at Me, an autobiography of Wilko Johnson, the original guitarist with Dr. Feelgood. The book was published, by Polygon, as Lee Brilleaux: Rock'n'Roll Gentleman.
