= Dr. Feelgood (band) =

British rock band

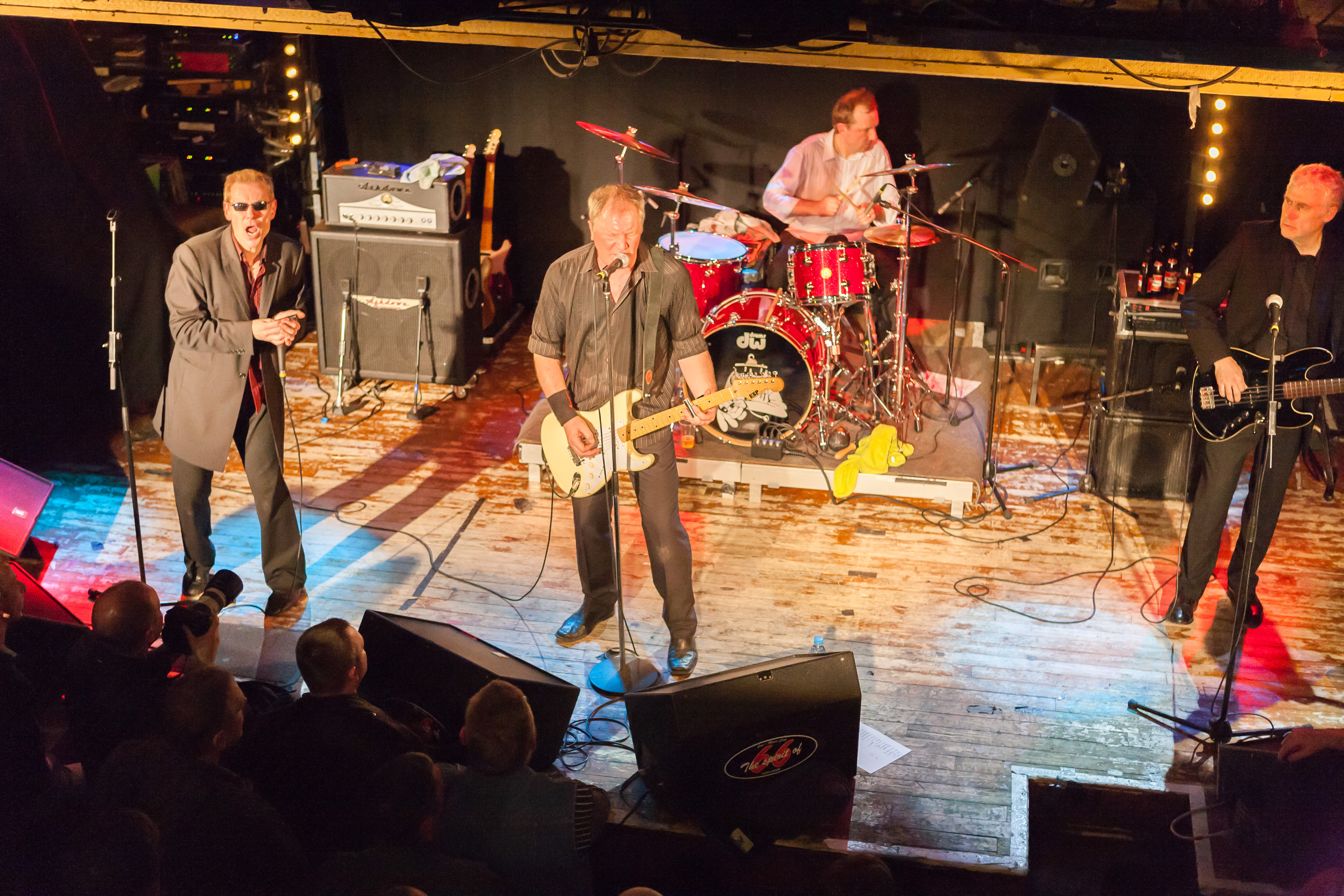
- Dr. Feelgood in 2009. Left to right: Robert Kane, Steve Walwyn, Kevin Morris, Phil H. Mitchell

Background information
- Origin: Canvey Island, Essex, England
- Genres: Pub rock; R&B; blues rock; rock and roll; proto-punk
- Years active: 1971–present
- Label: United Artists
- Members: Kevin Morris; Phil H. Mitchell; Robert Kane; Gordon Russell
- Past members: Lee Brilleaux; The Big Figure; John B. Sparks; Wilko Johnson; Gypie Mayo; Johnny Guitar; Buzz Barwell; Pat McMullan; Dave Bronze; Craig Rhind; Pete Gage; Steve Walwyn
- Website: drfeelgood.org

Dr. Feelgood are an English pub rock band formed in 1971. Hailing from Canvey Island, Essex, they are best known for early singles such as "She Does It Right", "Roxette", "Back in the Night" and "Milk and Alcohol". Their original and distinctively British R&B sound was centred on Wilko Johnson's choppy guitar style. Along with Johnson, the initial band line-up included singer Lee Brilleaux and the rhythm section of John B. Sparks, known as "Sparko", on bass guitar and John Martin, known as "The Big Figure", on drums. Although their most commercially productive years were the mid to late-1970s, and in spite of Brilleaux's death in 1994, a version of the band (featuring none of the original members) continues to tour and record.

== Career ==
=== Early years ===
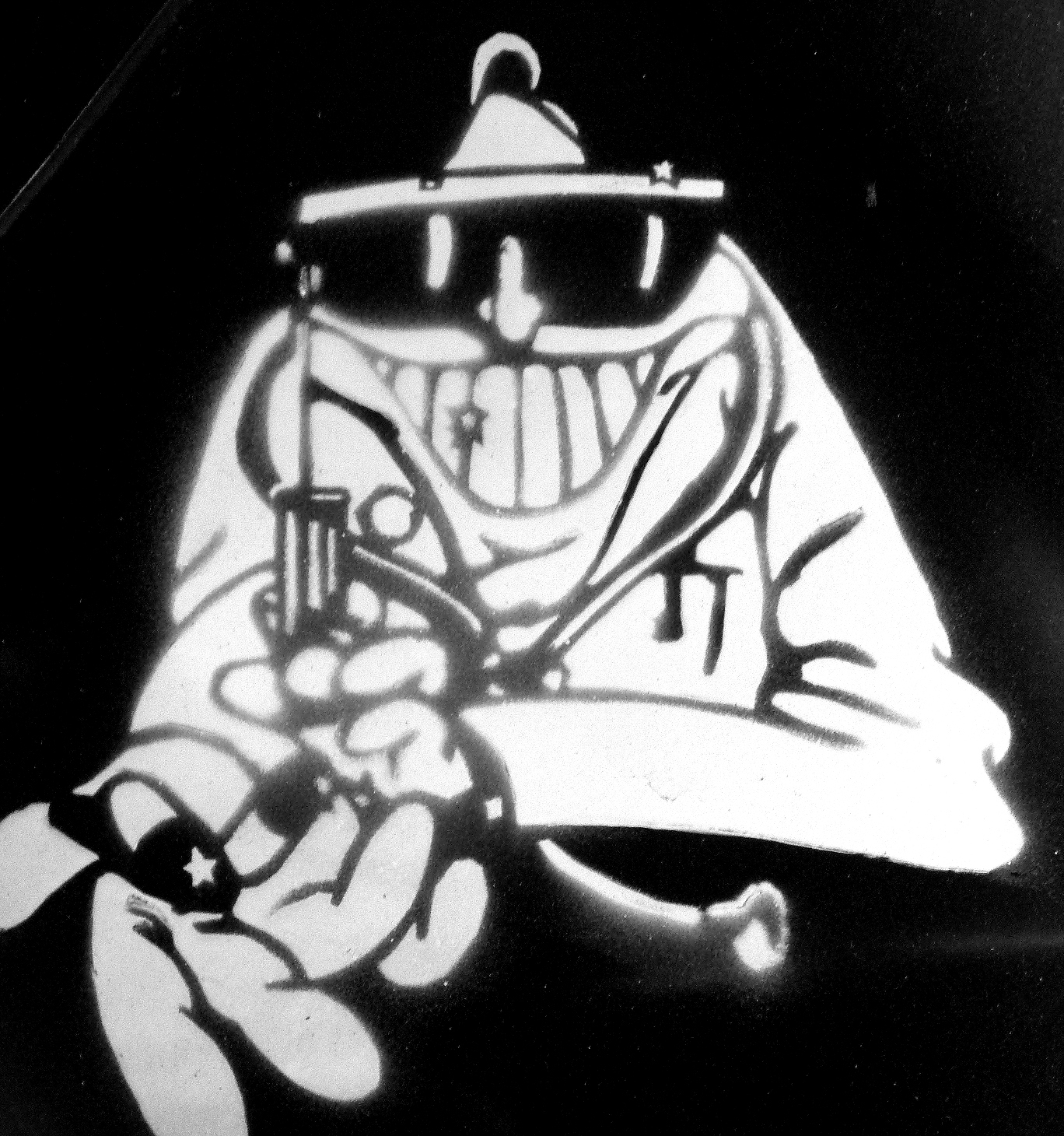
Dr. Feelgood's mascot, as used by the band in the 1970s and early 1980s

The band were formed on Canvey Island in 1971 by Johnson, Brilleaux and Sparks, who had all been members of existing R&B bands, and soon added drummer John Martin. They took their name from a 1962 record by the American blues pianist and singer Willie Perryman (also known as "Piano Red") called "Dr. Feel-Good", which Perryman recorded under the name of Dr. Feelgood & the Interns. The song was covered by several British beat groups in the 1960s, including Johnny Kidd & the Pirates. The term is also a slang term for heroin or for a physician who is willing to over-prescribe drugs.

By late 1973, the band's driving R&B influence had made them one of the most popular bands on the growing London pub rock circuit, which included regular appearances at the Lord Nelson music pub venue. They recorded their debut album, Down by the Jetty, for United Artists in 1974. Like many pub rock acts, Dr. Feelgood built up a dedicated following and were known primarily for their high energy and intense live performances constantly honed through their touring and regular performances. Their studio albums such as Down by the Jetty and Malpractice (1975) added significantly to their rising popularity.

Their breakthrough 1976 live album, Stupidity, reached number one in the UK Albums Chart (their only chart-topper). The Ramones were the opening act for the group's May 1976 shows at the Bottom Line in New York.

After the 1977 follow-up Sneakin' Suspicion, Johnson left the group because of conflicts with Lee Brilleaux. He was replaced by Gypie Mayo. The band with Mayo were never as popular as when Johnson was in the line-up, yet they went on to enjoy their only top ten hit single in 1979 with "Milk and Alcohol". Johnson, who died in 2022, went on to form the group Solid Senders before joining Ian Dury and the Blockheads in 1980.

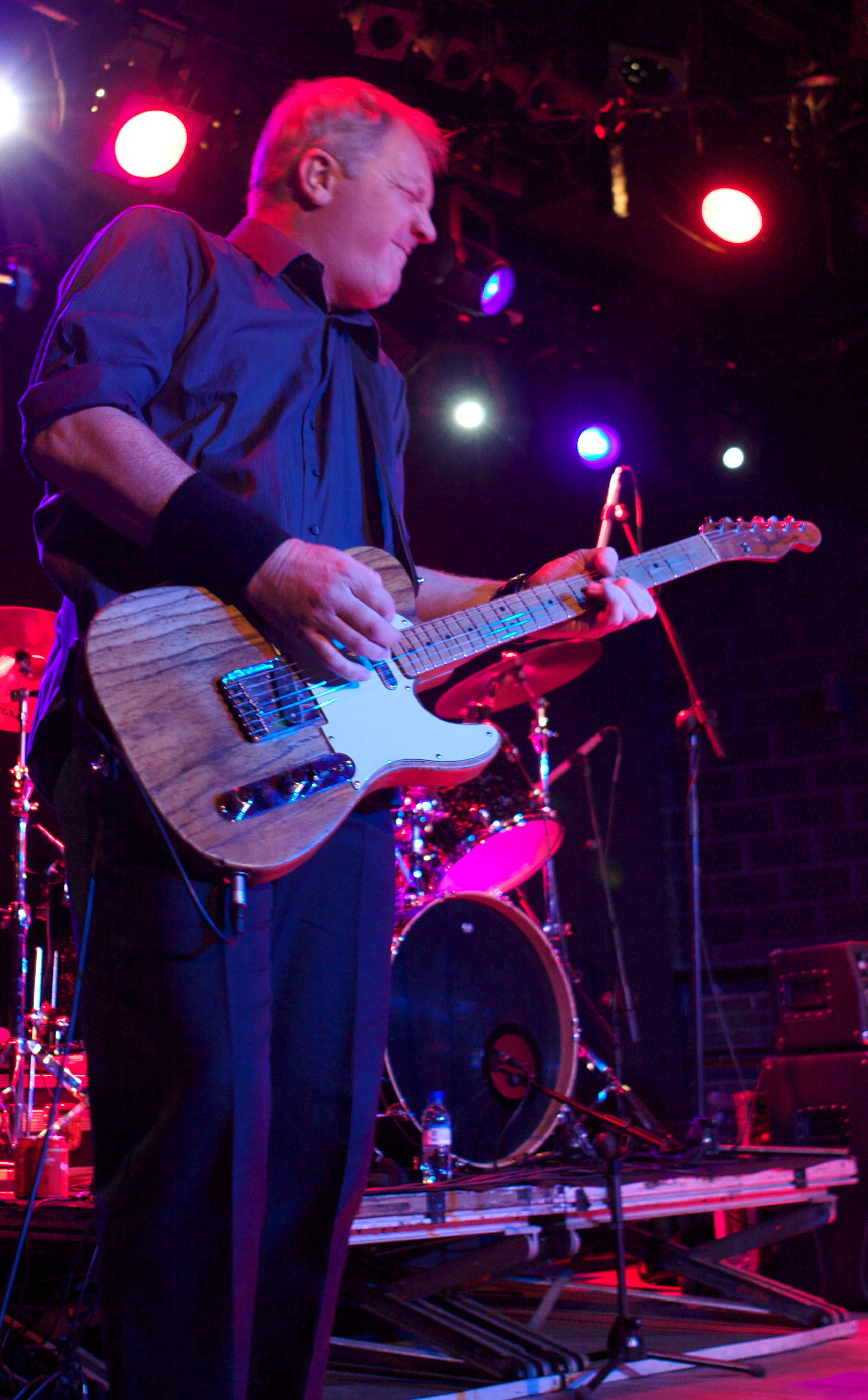
Guitarist Steve Walwyn in Barcelona, 18 March 2009

=== Later years ===
Despite Mayo's departure in 1981, and various subsequent line-up changes which left Brilleaux the only remaining original member, Dr. Feelgood continued touring and recording through the 1980s. The band then suffered an almost career-finishing blow when Brilleaux died of lymphoma on 7 April 1994.

As Brilleaux had insisted prior to his death, Dr. Feelgood reunited in May 1995, initially with vocalist Pete Gage (not to be confused with guitarist Pete Gage of Geno Washington and Vinegar Joe), and recommenced touring in 1996. Though the band contained no original members at this point, the musicians backing Gage had all previously played as members of Dr. Feelgood for at least five years, and in some cases for over a decade. In 1999, Gage was replaced by Robert Kane, formerly of the Animals II and the Alligators, who celebrated his 1,000th gig as the frontman of Dr. Feelgood in April 2007.

Every year after Brilleaux's death, a special concert known as the Lee Brilleaux Birthday Memorial was held on Canvey Island, where former and current Feelgoods celebrated the music of Dr. Feelgood, and raised money for The Fair Havens Hospice in Westcliff-on-Sea. Fans attended from all over the globe, and the 20th and final event was held on 9 May 2014. Still based in the UK, Dr. Feelgood continue to play across the world, with concerts in 2010 in Austria, Bahrain, Belgium, Finland, France, the Netherlands, Italy, Spain and Switzerland.

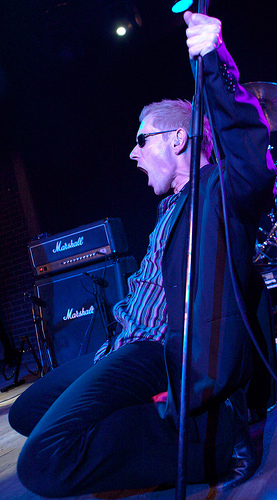
Current vocalist Robert Kane performing in Barcelona, 18 March 2009

Band manager Chris Fenwick organises an annual walk around Canvey to commemorate Brilleaux's life, as well as additional walking tours during which he points out landmarks from the band's career. These include the jetty featured in the photograph on the band's first album cover, and venues where they played early in their career, such as The Lobster Smack inn, The Monico Nightclub and The Canvey Club (disguised as 'The Alibi Club' on the sleeve of the album Sneakin' Suspicion).

A film by Julien Temple about the early days of the band, Oil City Confidential, premiered at the London Film Festival on 22 October 2009, and received a standing ovation. Guest of honour was Lee Brilleaux's mother Joan Collinson, along with his widow Shirley and children Kelly and Nick. All the surviving members of the original band were present along with manager Chris Fenwick, former tour manager and Stiff Records boss Jake Riviera and other friends and colleagues of the band. The film has its own Facebook page. Reviewing the film for The Independent, Nick Hasted concluded: "Feelgood are remembered in rock history, if at all, as John the Baptists to punk's messiahs". On general release from 1 February 2010, the film was critically well received, with Peter Bradshaw of The Guardian describing it as "...a vivid study of period, music and place". The film was first broadcast on BBC Four in April 2010.

A major exhibition of memorabilia celebrating the band's career ran at The Canvey Club between May and July 2013, having been extended several times.

On 16 June 2021, it was announced that Walwyn was "unavailable to play live shows for the foreseeable future", due to family holiday commitments and the fact that his son has a possible compromised immune system. Later concerts were played by former guitarist Gordon Russell, whom Walwyn had replaced 32 years before. With Russell back in the band, they recorded Damm Right! in 2022, the first album with original songs since The Feelgood Factor in 1993, their last with Brilleaux.

In April 2024 the band's van was stolen, leaving them without any instruments and equipment, a week before a forthcoming tour of Germany. The theft took place outside the home of bassist Phil Mitchell in Hockley, Essex, between the night of 15 April and the morning of 16 April.

In 2025 John B. Sparks, the original founding member and bass player on all of the hit records, started gigging again with his own band 'Sparko's Going Back Home'.

== Members ==
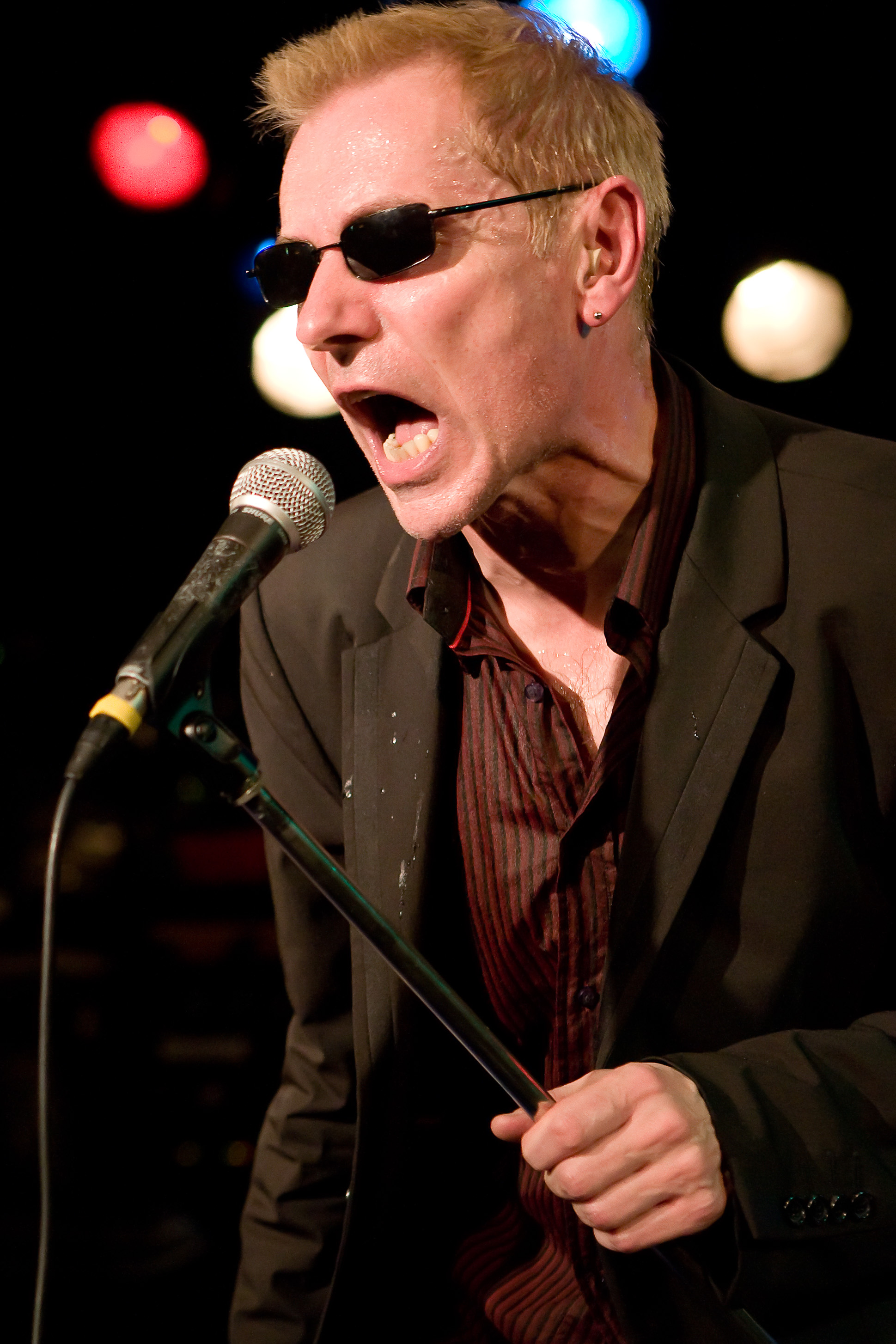
Robert Kane

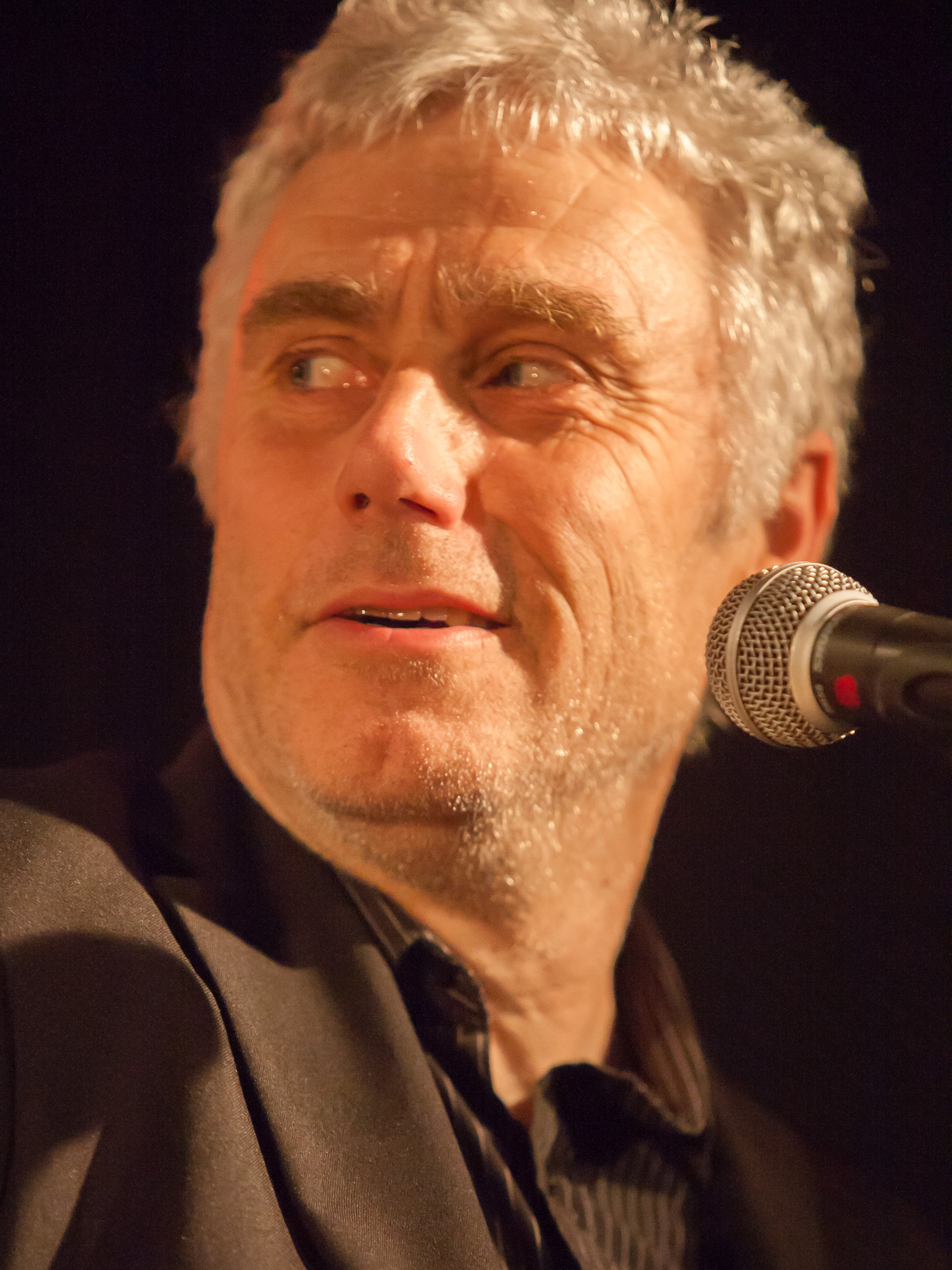
Phil H. Mitchell

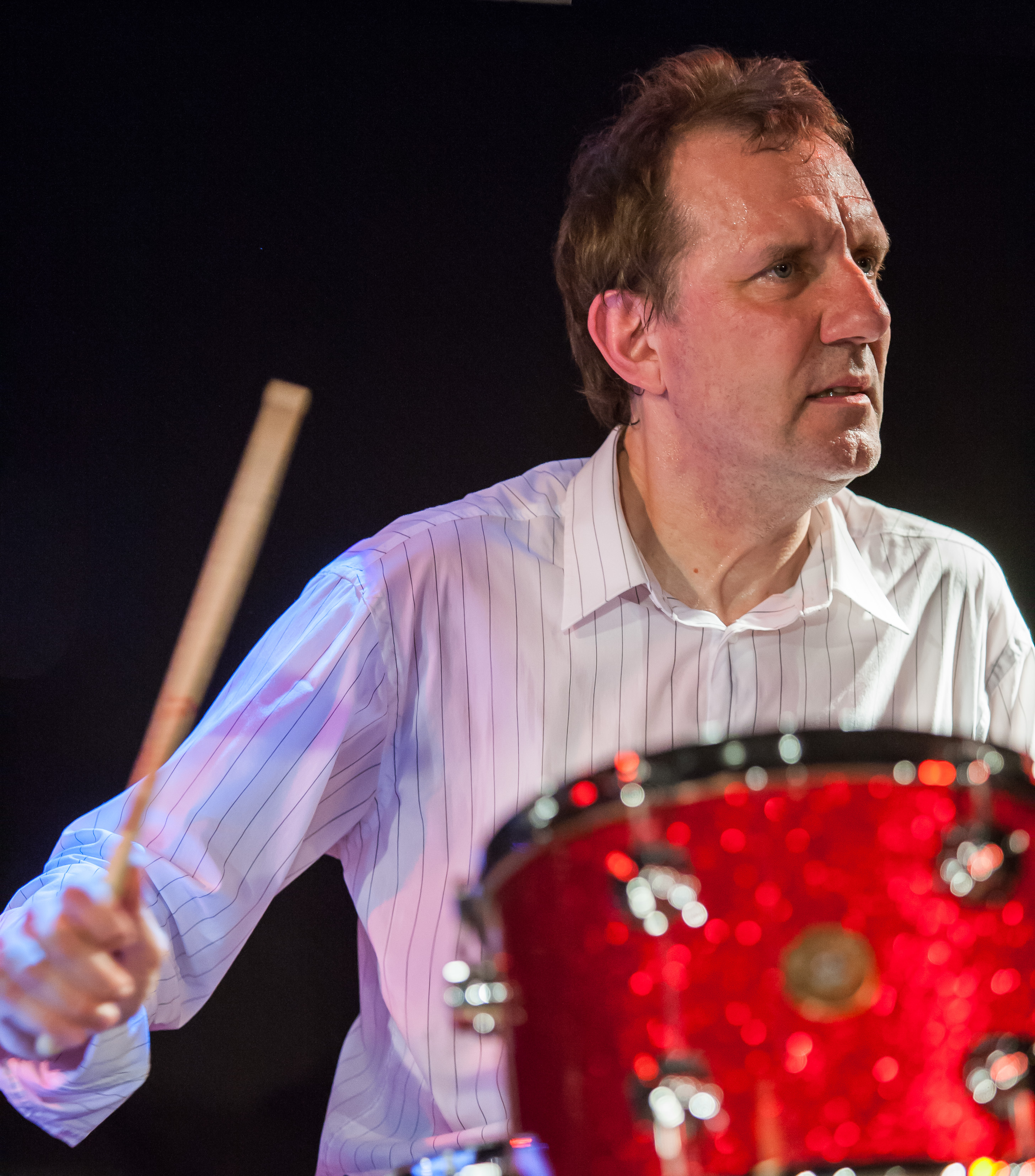
Kevin Morris

Current members

- Phil H. Mitchell – bass, acoustic guitar, backing vocals (1983–1991, 1995–present)
- Kevin Morris – drums, percussion, backing vocals (1983–1994, 1995–present)
- Gordon Russell – lead and slide guitars, backing vocals (1983–1989, 2021–present)
- Robert Kane – lead vocals, harmonica (1999–present)

== Discography ==
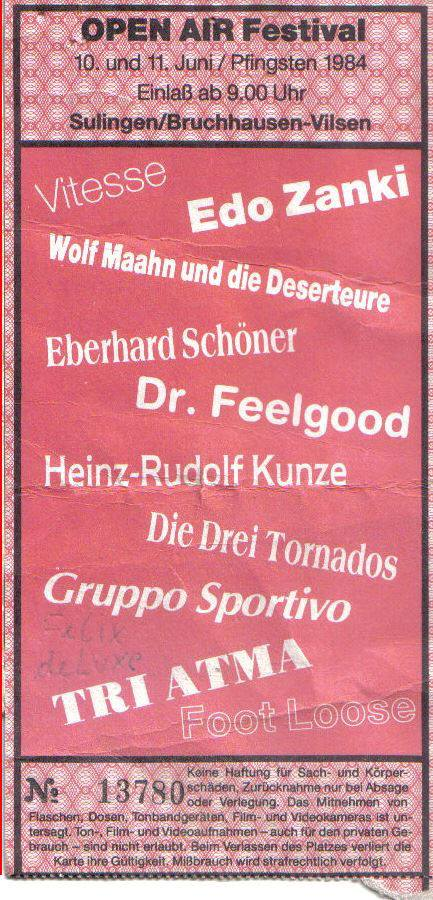
Lineup for the 1984 Bruchhausen-Festival in Lower Saxony, West Germany, featuring Dr. Feelgood alongside acts like Vitesse, Eberhard Schoener and Heinz Rudolf Kunze.

- Down by the Jetty (1975)
- Malpractice (1975)
- Stupidity (1976)
- Sneakin' Suspicion (1977)
- Be Seeing You (1977)
- Private Practice (1978)
- Let It Roll (1979)
- A Case of the Shakes (1980)
- Fast Women & Slow Horses (1982)
- Doctor's Orders (1984)
- Mad Man Blues (1985)
- Brilleaux (1986)
- Classic (1987)
- Primo (1991)
- The Feelgood Factor (1993)
- On the Road Again (1996)
- Chess Masters (2000)
- Repeat Prescription (2006)
- Damm Right! (2022)
- Live in Caen (2024)

== Bibliography ==
- Jost, Roland; Nättilä, Teppo, Mäkinen, Rauno – From Roxette To Ramona, Dr Feelgood And Wilko Johnson on Record – ISBN 3-033-00460-1
- Down by the Jetty – The Dr Feelgood Story by Tony Moon – Northdown Publishing 1997 (Rev 2002) – ISBN 1-900711-15-X
