= Carlene Carter discography =

- Studio albums: 11
- Compilation albums: 2
- Singles: 26
- Music videos: 10

Carlene Carter is an American country music artist. Her discography comprises nine studio albums, two compilation albums, 26 singles, and 10 music videos.

== Studio albums ==
Title	Album details	Peak positions							Certifications
Title	Album details	US Country	US	US Folk	US Rock	AUS	CAN Country	CAN	Certifications
Carlene Carter	Release date: March 14, 1978; Label: Warner Bros.	—	—	—	—	—	—	—	
Two Sides to Every Woman	Release date: June 12, 1979; Label: Warner Bros.	—	—	—	—	—	—	—	
Musical Shapes	Release date: August 1, 1980; Label: Warner Bros.	—	139	—	—	88	—	—	
Blue Nun	Release date: 1981; Label: Warner Bros.	—	—	—	—	—	—	—	
C'est C Bon	Release date: 1983; Label: Epic	—	—	—	—	—	—	—	
I Fell in Love	Release date: August 13, 1990; Label: Reprise	19	—	—	—	—	—	—	CAN: Gold
Little Love Letters	Release date: June 22, 1993; Label: Giant	35	196	—	—	—	2	45	CAN: Gold
Little Acts of Treason	Release date: August 8, 1995; Label: Giant	65	—	—	—	—	18	—	
Stronger	Release date: March 4, 2008; Label: Yep Roc	69	—	—	—	—	—	—	
Carter Girl	Release date: April 8, 2014; Label: Rounder	40	—	—	—	—	—	—	
Sad Clowns & Hillbillies (John Mellencamp featuring Carlene Carter)	Release date: April 28, 2017; Label: Republic	—	11	1	3	—	—	—	
"—" denotes releases that did not chart

== Compilation albums ==
Title	Album details
Hindsight 20/20	Release date: September 10, 1996; Label: Giant
The Platinum Collection	Release date: August 6, 2007; Label: Rhino Entertainment

== Singles ==
=== As lead artist ===
Year	Single	Peak positions				Album
Year	Single	US Country	US Bubb.	US AC	CAN Country	Album
1978	"Never Together but Close Sometimes"	—	—	—	—	Carlene Carter
1978	"Love Is Gone"	—	—	—	—	Carlene Carter
1979	"Do It in a Heartbeat"	42	8	36	56	Two Sides to Every Woman
1979	"Two Sides to Every Woman"	—	—	—	—	Two Sides to Every Woman
1980	"Baby Ride Easy" (with Dave Edmunds)	76	—	—	—	Musical Shapes
1980	"Ring of Fire"	—	—	—	—	Musical Shapes
1981	"Do Me Lover" (with Paul Carrack)	—	—	—	—	Blue Nun
1981	"Oh How Happy" (with Paul Carrack)	—	—	—	—	Blue Nun
1983	"Meant It for a Minute"	—	—	—	—	C'est C Bon
1983	"Heart to Heart"	—	—	—	—	C'est C Bon
1990	"I Fell in Love"	3	—	—	3	I Fell in Love
1990	"Come On Back"	3	—	—	2	I Fell in Love
1991	"The Sweetest Thing"	25	—	—	8	I Fell in Love
1991	"One Love"	33	—	—	17	I Fell in Love
1993	"Every Little Thing"	3	—	—	3	Little Love Letters
1993	"Unbreakable Heart"	51	—	—	34	Little Love Letters
1993	"Sweet Meant to Be"	—	—	—	—	Little Love Letters
1994	"I Love You 'Cause I Want To"	50	—	—	20	Little Love Letters
1994	"Something Already Gone"	43	—	—	44	Maverick (soundtrack)
1994	"Rockin' Little Christmas"	66	—	—	—	A Giant Country Christmas, Vol. 1
1995	"Love Like This"	70	—	—	54	Little Acts of Treason
1995	"Hurricane"	75	—	—	—	Little Acts of Treason
1995	"He Will Be Mine"	—	—	—	84	Little Acts of Treason
2014	"Little Black Train"	—	—	—	—	Carter Girl
"—" denotes releases that did not chart

=== As featured artist ===
Year	Single	Peak positions			Album
Year	Single	US Country	US	CAN Country	Album
1983	"I Couldn't Say No" (Robert Ellis Orrall with Carlene Carter)	—	32	—	Special Pain
1989	"Time's Up" (Southern Pacific with Carlene Carter)	26	—	19	County Line
"—" denotes releases that did not chart

== Music videos ==
Year	Video	Director
1978	"Never Together But Close Sometimes"	
1983	"Meant It for a Minute"	Bruce Gowers
1990	"I Fell in Love"	Gerry Wenner
1991	"The Sweetest Thing"	Gerry Wenner
1993	"Every Little Thing"	Adam Bernstein
1993	"Unbreakable Heart"	Greg Gold
1994	"I Love You 'Cause I Want To"	Gerry Wenner
1994	"Something Already Gone"	Gerry Wenner
1995	"Love Like This"	Gerry Wenner
2014	"Little Black Train"	
