= Profile: Best of Emmylou Harris =

Compilation album by Emmylou Harris
- Released: November 1978
- Genre: Country
- Length: 39:01
- Label: Warner Bros.
- Producer: Brian Ahern

Emmylou Harris chronology
Quarter Moon in a Ten Cent Town (1978)	Profile: Best of Emmylou Harris (1978)	Blue Kentucky Girl (1979)

Professional ratings
Review scores
Source	Rating
AllMusic	4.5/5 stars
Christgau's Record Guide	B+

Profile: Best of Emmylou Harris is a compilation of hits by Emmylou Harris from her first four Reprise/Warner albums: Pieces of the Sky, Elite Hotel, Luxury Liner and Quarter Moon in a Ten Cent Town. The album rose as high as #9 on the Billboard country albums chart in 1978.

== Track listing ==
No.	Title	Writer(s)	Length
1.	"One of These Days"	Earl Montgomery	3:00
2.	"Sweet Dreams"	Don Gibson	3:04
3.	"To Daddy"	Dolly Parton	2:42
4.	"(You Never Can Tell) C'est La Vie"	Chuck Berry	3:23
5.	"Making Believe"	Jimmy Work	3:32
6.	"Easy From Now On"	Susanna Clark, Carlene Carter	3:04
7.	"Together Again"	Buck Owens	3:49
8.	"If I Could Only Win Your Love"	Charlie Louvin, Ira Louvin	2:33
9.	"Too Far Gone"	Billy Sherrill	3:26
10.	"Two More Bottles of Wine"	Delbert McClinton	3:02
11.	"Boulder to Birmingham"	Emmylou Harris, Bill Danoff	3:31
12.	"Hello Stranger" (with Nicolette Larson)	A.P. Carter	3:55
Total length:			39:01

== Release history ==
Release history and formats for Profile: Best of Emmylou Harris
Region	Date	Format	Label	Ref.
North America	November 1978	LP; cassette	Warner Bros. Records	
