= Plain Spoken: From the Chicago Theatre =

Live album by John Mellencamp
- Released: May 11, 2018 (Streaming February 1, 2018)
- Recorded: October 25, 2016
- Venue: Chicago Theatre in Chicago
- Genre: Rock
- Label: Eagle Rock

John Mellencamp chronology
Sad Clowns & Hillbillies (2017)	Plain Spoken: From the Chicago Theatre (2018)	Other People's Stuff (2018)

Plain Spoken: From the Chicago Theatre is a live album and concert video by American singer-songwriter John Mellencamp released on May 11, 2018 by Eagle Rock Entertainment. The concert with Mellencamp's voiceover, which was available on Netflix beginning February 1, 2018, captures Mellencamp's performing live at Chicago Theatre in Chicago, Illinois. Although it shares the title Plain Spoken with a 2014 Mellencamp studio album, this concert includes only two tracks from that previous effort, but it came from the tail end of Mellencamp's 2015-2016 Plain Spoken tour.

The other songs in the concert span much of his career and include hits such as "Small Town", "Cherry Bomb" and "Pink Houses". The video release features an optional improvised voiceover by Mellencamp where the singer comments about his life and his creative process among other subjects. In his review of the release, The Indianapolis Star music writer David Lindquist posited that "the film's most distinctive element" is this voiceover, which "nudges Plain Spoken out of the realm of concert film and into documentary territory".

== Track listing ==
"My Soul's Got Wings" features Carlene Carter on vocals. All songs were written by Mellencamp unless otherwise noted.

1. "Lawless Times" – 4:31
2. "Troubled Man" – 4:05
3. "Minutes To Memories" (Mellencamp; George M. Green) – 4:20
4. "Small Town" – 5:09
5. "Stones in My Passway" (Robert Johnson) – 3:50
6. "Pop Singer" – 3:24
7. "Check It Out" – 5:18
8. "Longest Days" – 4:00
9. "The Full Catastrophe" – 4:01
10. "My Soul's Got Wings" (Mellencamp; Woody Guthrie) – 2:58
11. "Overture" – 3:05
12. "Rain on the Scarecrow" (Mellencamp; Green) – 4:49
13. "Paper in Fire" – 4:39
14. "Authority Song" – 4:35
15. "Pink Houses" – 7:14
16. "Cherry Bomb" – 6:03
