= Blanket of Secrecy =

English new wave band

- Origin: England
- Genres: New wave; synth-pop
- Years active: 1982
- Labels: F-Beat; Warner Bros.
- Past members: Peter Marsh (aka Tinker); Roger Bechirian (aka Soldier); Andy Howell (aka Tailor); Phil McWalter (aka Spy); Ron Chadwick (aka Sailor)

Blanket of Secrecy (BoS) was a short-lived English new wave band formed in 1982. The band was notable for the fact that its band members, true to their band name, were never officially identified at the time - only the pseudonyms Tinker, Tailor and Soldier were disclosed to refer to the main members. (The writing credits of two BoS songs also mentioned Spy and Sailor as co-authors). This led to some speculation in the music press regarding the true identity of the members, with rumours that they might be the Attractions (Elvis Costello's backing band) and speculation that the lead singer was Jack Hues of Wang Chung. However, they were eventually revealed to be Peter Marsh (Tinker, the lead singer), Andy Howell (Tailor), and Roger Bechirian (Soldier). Two other songwriters -- Phil McWalter (Spy) and Ron Chadwick (Sailor) -- were also associated with the project, but were not band members.

Their music was synth-pop, similar to their contemporaries A Flock of Seagulls, although comparisons to the Attractions were also made.

== History ==
=== Releases and chart history ===
In keeping with the band's fondness for (and perhaps more directly, graphic artist Barney Bubbles' career-long tendencies towards) misdirection and playful obfuscation, the band's debut LP was titled Walls Have Ears -- or Ears Have Walls, depending on a number of factors:

- The UK release has the title Ears Have Walls printed on the cover, but the title Walls Have Ears on the labels. (UK promo copies have a special embossed Walls Have Ears title on the cover, and the labels also show the title as Walls Have Ears.)
- The continental European releases have no title on the front cover, the title Walls Have Ears on the spine, and the title Ears Have Walls on the record labels.
- The Canadian release is titled Walls Have Ears on both the cover and the labels.
- The U.S. release is titled Ears Have Walls on both the cover and the labels.

All of these issues have identical music, and sequencing. The album cover was designed by Barney Bubbles. The group can be seen in shadow on the album's back cover, in a photo by Brian Griffin, and in mostly obscured images on the cover of the single "Say You Will". They are seen full-face with complete clarity (and no attempt to obfuscate their images) in the video for "Say You Will". The music video received some airplay on MTV in 1983. Released in 1982, the album and single received significant airplay on both sides of the Atlantic, featuring in the Tipperade in the Netherlands for four weeks.

At the time Walls Have Ears/Ears Have Walls was recorded, BoS also recorded an entire second album, but the band broke up before it was released. It remained unreleased for 35 years, before finally being issued (as a digital-only album) under the title "2" on 24 August 2017 through Trick Records.

=== Speculation about the band's identity ===
At the time of the group's one and only LP release, there were three main theories about the identity of the musicians involved with Blanket of Secrecy.

- Theory No. 1: Because of the album credit "Directed by Roger Bechirian", all songs and instruments must be by Bechirian.
- Theory No. 2: Some thought the album was actually by the Attractions. Known primarily as Elvis Costello's backing group, the Attractions (a three-piece band, just like BoS) had issued one LP in 1980 that had been produced by Bechirian. Additionally, the Attractions were known to favour pseudonyms—the "Brain/Hart" writing team that penned several songs on their 1980 album Mad About The Wrong Boy was later revealed to be Attractions keyboardist Steve Nieve and his wife, poet and lyricist Fay Hart. Finally, the Attractions shared the same music publishing company as Blanket of Secrecy (Plangent Visions Music, Inc.), the same record label (F-Beat), and the same management company (Jake Riviera's Riviera Global Productions).
- Theory No. 3: Several reviews at the time mentioned the name Peter Marsh as the possible main-man of the band. Marsh had been an original member of Easy Street, a mellow acoustic act of the 1970s whose ranks also included Richard James Burgess. Marsh had formed New Wave band Twist, which released one album in 1979, and he subsequently went on to produce plenty of synth-pop in the 1980s, collaborating with artists including Vangelis.

=== Actual identity ===
Extensive research by Blanket of Secrecy fan Gary L. Maher eventually identified the participants definitively as:

- Peter Marsh ("Tinker") – vocals and guitar
- Roger Béchirian ("Soldier") – keyboards and backing vocals, percussion, producer, engineer and mixer
- Andy Howell ("Tailor") – bass and backing vocals

Jack Hues of Wang Chung also confirmed the identity of Peter Marsh in an interview by Russell A. Trunk for Exclusive Magazine.

Additionally, the single "Say You Will" bears a writing credit of Tinker/Spy. ASCAP has identified "Spy" as Phil McWalter. The song "Yo Yo" was credited to Tinker/Sailor, and Maher has identified "Sailor" as artist Ron Chadwick.

The Attractions connection trumpeted by some was proven to have been entirely incorrect, as no involvement by any of the Attractions in the Blanket of Secrecy Walls album has ever come to light -- although Pete Thomas played drums on two songs recorded for the second, never-released album, and Elvis Costello and Steve Nieve had performed as guests on the lone album by Peter Marsh's former band, Twist.

As for the Wang Chung connection, the song "Lovers" was written by Jack Hues and Nick Feldman (a.k.a. Nick De Spig) of Wang Chung, and arranged by Hues. One-time Wang Chung member "Hogg" (Dave Burnand) also appears on the album. The connection between the two bands is that Bechirian co-produced Wang Chung's first album, back when that group was known as Huang Chung.

=== Life before and after Blanket of Secrecy ===
All three BoS members had a hand in Carlene Carter's C'est C Bon record from 1983. Bechirian produced, and all three played on the album, as well as co-writing two of the songs. Bechirian also produced Nick Lowe's 1983 album The Abominable Showman, which featured backing vocals from Marsh and a Marsh–Howell song called "Cool Reaction".

- Peter Marsh's musical career goes back at least to 1974, when he released a record with brother-in-law Ken Nicol under the name Nicol & Marsh (a.k.a. Nicol & Marsh's Easy Street). They then changed their name to Easy Street after Richard James Burgess joined and put out two records in 1976 and 1977. Their last record together was a 1978 release called simply Nicol & Marsh. Marsh's next project was Twist, which put out one album called This Is Your Life (1979). Between then and BoS, he also worked with Vangelis, with whom he released the single "Don't Be Foolish" in 1980 and Manfred Mann's Earth Band, and released solo singles including "You Say You Wanna Love Me" (1981, produced by Godley & Creme) and "Harmony" (1984).
- Roger Bechirian is a noted producer, having worked with Huang Chung (Wang Chung), Elvis Costello, Squeeze, Nick Lowe, Dave Edmunds, Carlene Carter, Trash Can Sinatras, Lene Lovich, the Undertones, Bell X1 and the reunited Monkees.
- Andrew Howell is best known for having co-written The Monkees' reunion single "Heart and Soul", from Pool It!. He co-wrote and played many of the instruments on Simon Byrne's album Dream Crazy. He also played bass on Robert Ellis Orrall's Contain Yourself. Prior to BoS, Howell was also the bass player in South London punk band The Red Lights. He worked on a number of projects, including The Unbroken Ponies with former Red Lights manager Harry Rogers and Steve Young, lead guitarist of 1970s South London band Stone Cold Sober.

== Discography ==
=== Albums ===
- Ears Have Walls/Walls Have Ears (1982)
- 2 (2017)

=== Singles ===
- "Say You Will" (extended mix) / "In the Garden" / "Feather in My Hand" (Warner Bros. 12" single)
- "Say You Will" / "Close to Me" (Warner Bros. 45-rpm single)

== Album credits ==
=== Walls Have Ears / Ears Have Walls ===
Side One:

1. Say You Will (4:03) (Tinker/Spy) Intersong Music ASCAP
2. Young Heart (3:42)
3. Love Me Too (2:46)
4. Remember Me and You (3:24)
5. Long Cool Glass (3:35)
6. Photograph (4:46)

Side Two:

1. Yo Yo (3:19) (Tinker/Sailor) Intersong Music ASCAP
2. Close to Me (4:16) (Tinker) Intersong Music ASCAP
3. Something I Don't Need (3:02)
4. Tell Me Baby (3:29)
5. Lovers (4:52) (Hues/De Spig) WB Music Corp. ASCAP
6. B.O.S. Theme (3:24) (Tinker/Tailor/Soldier)

All songs written by Tinker/Tailor except as indicated
All songs published by Intersong Music/Plangent Visions Music, Inc. ASCAP except as indicated
Copyright 1982 Warner Bros. Records, Inc.

Produced and directed by Roger Bechirian
Recorded at Ampro Studios and Rockfield Studios
Mixed at Rockfield
Assistant engineers, Rob Keyloch at Ampro and Paul Cobbold at Rockfield
Additional musicians:
Hogg – saxophone
Jack Hues – arrangements on "Lovers"
Originally mastered by Aaron Chakraverty at The Master Room
LP design – Heeps Willard (a pseudonym for Barney Bubbles)
Photography – Brian Griffin

- This LP was reissued on CD as Ears Have Walls in 2022 with three bonus tracks: "Say You Will" (extended mix), "In the Garden", and "Feather in My Hand".

=== Blanket of Secrecy 2 ===
Move to the Rhythm
We Should Be Old Enough
Mr Munsun
What Kind of World
Take Her by the Hand
Walking on Water
Endless Love
Come Lie on My Couch (Remastered)
A Lonely Heart
Can't Turn Me Off
Covered by the Contract
Baby Don't You Change

- ℗ 2017 Trick Records
