= I Fell in Love =

I Fell in Love may refer to:

- I Fell in Love (album), a 1990 album by Carlene Carter
- "I Fell in Love" (Carlene Carter song)
- "I Fell in Love" (Rockell song)
- Kadhalil Vizhunthen (lit. 'I Fell in Love'), a 2008 Indian Tamil-language film

== See also ==
- Aur Pyaar Ho Gaya (lit. 'And I Fell in Love'), a 1997 Indian Hindi-language film by Rahul Rawail
- Aur Pyaar Ho Gaya (TV series) (lit. 'And I Fell in Love'), a 2014 Indian drama television series broadcast on Zee TV
- "Mohabbat Ho Gayi Hai" (lit. 'I've Fallen in Love') or "Hamen Jab Se Mohabbat", a song by Anu Malik, Sonu Nigam and Alka Yagnik from the 1997 Indian film Border, remade by Mithoon, Sonu Nigam and Palak Muchhal for its sequel Border 2 (2026)
