= Just Because I'm a Woman: Songs of Dolly Parton =

Just Because I'm a Woman

Studio album by Various artists
- Released: October 14, 2003
- Recorded: 2003
- Label: Sugar Hill

Just Because I'm a Woman: Songs of Dolly Parton is a various-artists tribute album to Dolly Parton, released on October 14, 2003. The title song is a rerecording by Parton of a song she originally wrote during the 1960s and first included on her album Just Because I'm a Woman in 1968. The Emmylou Harris track "To Daddy" was recorded in 1978, and first appeared on Harris' album Quarter Moon in a Ten Cent Town (a single release of the song reached #3 on the U.S. country singles chart in early 1978); the remainder of the tracks on the album were new recordings by each of the artists made specifically for this project.

== Track listing ==
1. "9 to 5" - Alison Krauss
2. "I Will Always Love You" - Melissa Etheridge
3. "The Grass Is Blue" - Norah Jones
4. "Do I Ever Cross Your Mind" - Joan Osborne
5. "The Seeker" - Shelby Lynne
6. "Jolene" - Mindy Smith
7. "To Daddy" - Emmylou Harris
8. "Coat of Many Colors" - Shania Twain and Alison Krauss
9. "Little Sparrow" - Kasey Chambers
10. "Dagger Through the Heart" - Sinéad O'Connor
11. "Light of a Clear Blue Morning" - Allison Moorer
12. "Two Doors Down" - Me'shell Ndegeocello
13. "Just Because I'm a Woman" - Dolly Parton

== Charts ==
=== Weekly charts ===
Chart (2003)	Peak position
Australia (ARIA)	76
Australian Country Albums (ARIA)	6
US Billboard 200	55
US Top Country Albums (Billboard)	6
US Independent Albums (Billboard)	2

=== Year-end charts ===
Chart (2004)	Position
US Top Country Albums (Billboard)	68
