= Mickey Raphael =

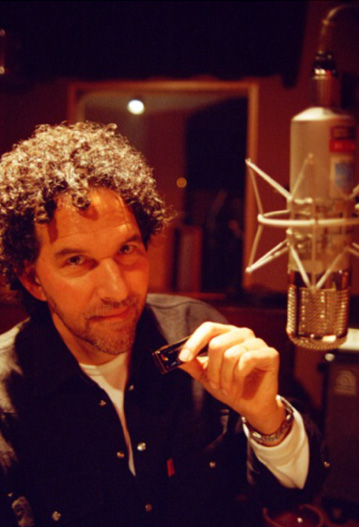
- Mickey Raphael in 2010

Background information
- Born: Michael Siegfried Raphael; November 7, 1951 (age 74); Dallas, Texas, U.S.
- Genres: Country, rock, pop
- Occupations: Musician, producer, actor
- Instrument: Harmonica
- Years active: 1972–present
- Website: Official website

Michael Siegfried Raphael (born November 7, 1951) is an American harmonica player, music producer and actor likely best known for his work with Willie Nelson, with whom he has toured as part of The Family since 1973.

He has performed or recorded with Jason Isbell, Townes Van Zandt, Guy Clark, Chris Stapleton, Jerry Jeff Walker, Tom Morello, Paul Simon, Snoop Dogg, Engelbert Humperdinck, Nitty Gritty Dirt Band, Leon Bridges, Neil Young, Norah Jones, Bob Dylan, Ray Charles, Duane Eddy, Vince Gill, Emmylou Harris, Leon Russell, Lionel Richie, Elton John, Mötley Crüe, Zac Brown Band, Dave Matthews, Blue Öyster Cult, Wynton Marsalis, Lonnie Donnegan, Kenny Chesney, Toby Keith, U2, Johnny Cash, Merle Haggard, Kris Kristofferson, Don Williams, Jerry Lee Lewis, Blind Boys of Alabama, Waylon Jennings, Aaron Lewis, Margo Price, Rodney Crowell, Gov't Mule, Warren Haynes, Tanya Tucker, Supersuckers, Dan Auerbach and Lucinda Williams.

Production credits include Naked Willie, a stripped-down remix of Willie Nelson's early RCA catalogs and the 2016 release of The Highwaymen box set, which includes live performances by Willie Nelson, Waylon Jennings, Johnny Cash and Kris Kristofferson, and one new release co-produced by Raphael with Chips Moman.

Raphael has also appeared in the movies Songwriter and Honeysuckle Rose, and filmed performances with Willie Nelson, Wynton Marsalis, and Norah Jones.

Mickey Raphael lives in Nashville and continues to tour, record, and produce projects in Nashville, New York, and Los Angeles.

== Personal life ==
Raphael grew up in Dallas with his parents and older brother. His father, who died in 1994, built the brothers' childhood home. Their mother died in 2019. Raphael graduated from Hillcrest High School in 1969. He reportedly dated actress Ali MacGraw in the mid-1980s.

== Selective discography ==
Mickey Raphael appears on the following albums:

- Elite Hotel – Emmylou Harris (1975)
- Luxury Liner – Emmylou Harris (1976)
- Two the Hard Way – Cher, Gregg Allman (1977)
- Quarter Moon in a Ten Cent Town – Emmylou Harris (1978)
- Ain't Living Long Like This – Rodney Crowell (1978)
- TNT – Tanya Tucker (1978)
- Right or Wrong – Rosanne Cash (1980)
- The Fox – Elton John (1981)
- Evangeline – Emmylou Harris (1981)
- Seven Year Ache – Rosanne Cash (1981)
- Cimarron – Emmylou Harris (1981)
- White Shoes – Emmylou Harris (1983)
- The Missing Years – John Prine (1991)
- Soft Talk – Shelby Lynne (1991)
- Time for Mercy – Jann Arden (1993)
- Flyer – Nanci Griffith (1994)
- The Tattooed Heart – Aaron Neville (1995)
- Little Acts of Treason – Carlene Carter (1995)
- Deuces Wild – B.B. King (1997)
- Let's Make Sure We Kiss Goodbye – Vince Gill (2000)
- Ringo Rama – Ringo Starr (2003)
- Nashville – Solomon Burke (2006)
- Just Who I Am: Poets & Pirates – Kenny Chesney (2007)
- I'm American – Billy Ray Cyrus (2011)
- Mission Bell – Amos Lee (2011)
- Welcome to the Fishbowl – Kenny Chesney (2012)
- Life on a Rock – Kenny Chesney (2013)
- Carter Girl – Carlene Carter (2014)
- Sleeping Through the War – All Them Witches (2017)
- Windy City – Alison Krauss (2017)
- Songs for the Saints – Kenny Chesney (2018)
- Threads – Sheryl Crow (2019)
- Mississippi Suitcase – Peter Parcek (2020)
- World's Gone Wrong – Lucinda Williams (2026)
- Diamonds — Waylon Jennings (2026)
