= Peter Marsh (musician) =

- Born: Peter Marsh; 8 March 1952 (age 74); England
- Genres: Rock, folk, punk, synthpop, new wave, jazz
- Instruments: Vocals, guitar
- Website: The Peter Marsh

Peter Marsh (born 8 March 1952) is an English singer, songwriter, guitarist and music producer. He was a member of the band Easy Street, which released three albums. The Easy Street single "I've Been Lovin' You" entered the Billboard chart in July 1976. In the 1980s, he was best known as the lead singer in cult new wave group Blanket of Secrecy. Marsh also worked with Vangelis, Manfred Mann's Earth Band and Godley & Creme. His songs have been covered by artists including Nick Lowe and Jimmy Ruffin. In the 1990s he recorded the album "Water Under the Bridge", which was eventually released in 2021. More recently, Marsh has worked in France. He released the albums Stop the Clock in 2014 and Back to the Beginning in 2017. A second Blanket of Secrecy album, recorded in the 1980s, was released in 2017.

== Life and career ==
Marsh spent his early life in the Lake District, moving to London in the 1970s, where he was joined by his then brother-in-law Ken Nicol.

== Nicol & Marsh / Easy Street ==
Marsh had a long-standing musical partnership with his then brother-in-law, Ken Nicol, during the 1970s. The duo were known variously as both Nicol & Marsh and as Easy Street, which, for some of this time, also included Richard James Burgess. Marsh first signed to CBS, with Nicol, in 1973 and subsequently signed to Polydor in 1976. Albums released in collaboration with Nicol included:

- Nicol & Marsh's Easy Street (Epic / CBS Records, 1974). This album featured Pete Zorn on bass and saxes and was produced by Paul Phillips. Marsh is credited as the sole songwriter on tracks including "My Quietness", "Poor and Lonely Ones" and "Day by Day". Singles included "Midnight Cat" (1974), "I've Been Praying" (1974) and "Sinking Down" (1975), all credited to Nicol-Marsh. Arrangement on the tracks released as singles was by John Barham. The album includes a cover of "Peaceful Easy Feeling" (Jack Tempchin).
- Easy Street by Easy Street (Polydor, 1976). Easy Street expanded with the addition of Richard James Burgess for this album, which was recorded at Sarm East Studios. The Polydor publicity for the album involved something of a makeover for the band compared to the previous the CBS look, including hairstyles by John Frieda, who appeared on the cover in a cameo guest appearance. A single from the album, "I've Been Lovin' You" (co-written by Marsh with Richard James Burgess, Ken Nicol & Pete Zorn), entered the US Billboard Charts in July 1976.
- Under the Glass by Easystreet (Polydor, 1977). In addition to Marsh, Richard James Burgess and Ken Nicol, the Under the Glass album also extensively featured Kevin Savigar, a long-time musical associate of Rod Stewart. Marsh co-wrote the single track "Flying" (1977), with Nicol. Five tracks ("How Can You Take it So Hard", "Rely on You", "What Does The World Know", "Strange Chance" and "The Night of the 11th") are credited to Nicol, Marsh & Burgess), while two tracks are credited to Marsh and Burgess: "Is This Real" (Marsh, Burgess) and "I See You" (Burgess, Marsh). "Flying" was a released as a single (the B side, "Blame The Love", didn't appear on the album) and another single, "Love at Breakfast", which didn't feature on the album, was also released in 1977, with the track "Rely on You" featuring as the B side.
- Nicol & Marsh (Polydor, 1978). The Easy Street name was dropped for the final album in partnership with Nicol, which was recorded in the Pasha Music House, Hollywood. Richard James Burgess was no longer involved, but many renowned Los Angeles session musicians were used on the album, including Bill Payne (Little Feat), Victor Feldman (Steely Dan) and Leland Sklar (James Taylor's bass player). Tracks credited solely to Marsh included "As The Years Roll 'Round" and "Anthem of the Time". "Holdin' On To You" and "Lady of Windermere" are credited to Nicol & Marsh with two tracks, both released as singles "Streets of the Angels" (1978) and "Hurt By Love" (1978) credited to Nicol, Marsh & Bishop. The album includes a cover version of "I'll Be Back" (Lennon–McCartney).

Easy Street toured in Europe and the US and were the 1976 Runners-up of the UK TV show New Faces. The collaboration between Marsh and Nicol ended after the release of the final album. An interview with Nicol implied that Marsh was moving in a different direction, specifically appearing to refer to a growing collaboration between Marsh and Burgess.

== Twist ==
Marsh's first solo project, after breaking up with Nicol was Twist, a transition into the punk rock and new wave genres. Twist band members included Stevie Corduner, formerly of Byzantium (Drums), Wims, a.k.a. Tony Wimshurst (lead guitar, backing vocals), Andy Pask (bass) with Marsh as lead vocalist and acoustic guitarist.

Twist released This Is Your Life (Polydor, 1979), an album which included a new wave interpretation of the classic "The House of the Rising Sun". The title track "This Is Your Life" was released as a single. The B-side "Life's a Commercial Break", did not appear on the album. A second single, "Ads", with the B-side "Rebound" was released later in 1979. "Ads" appeared on the Polydor compilation album 20 of Another Kind Vol. 2, with "This Is Your Life". "This Is Your Life" featured Steve Nieve on keyboard and Jimmy Edwards and Elvis Costello on backing vocals. The involvement of Jimmy Edwards was due to Marsh's then manager, Tony Gorden, who also managed Sham 69. The involvement of Steve Nieve and Elvis Costello was due to their connections with Roger Bechirian, who co-produced the album with Marsh. Twist was Marsh's first significant collaboration with Bechirian. The two subsequently worked on a project which was to become known as Blanket of Secrecy. Twist was recorded at Amp Pro, a studio in Shepherds Bush in a house owned by Nick Lowe, which was converted by Tony Visconti. It was mixed at Eden Studios in Chiswick.

== Blanket of Secrecy ==
Marsh was revealed, after more than 20 years, to have been the lead singer (a.k.a. Tinker) in British new wave synthpop band Blanket of Secrecy, which has developed a worldwide cult following over the decades. The identity of the Blanket of Secrecy band members was not initially disclosed, with the Warner Bros Records press release at the time stating that "Blanket of Secrecy are three young men engaged in a project of extreme sensitivity and a necessarily classified nature. They have been chosen specifically for their imagination, their dexterity with electric instruments, their ability to compose with panache and style. <..> for reasons of, shall we say diplomacy, we feel compelled to cloak our subjects in a veil of anonymity. Who are they? Where do they come from? That, we're afraid, would be telling." Rumours at the time that they were The Attractions (best known as Elvis Costello's backing band) have subsequently been discredited with the true identity revealed as Peter Marsh, a.k.a. Tinker, Roger Bechirian, a.k.a. Soldier and Andy Howell, a.k.a. Tailor. Marsh co-produced the Blanket of Secrecy album, Walls Have Ears, with Bechirian. It was released in the U.S. by Warner Brothers and in the UK by F-Beat Records (as Ears Have Walls) in 1982. The album has been described by Billboard magazine as "an undiscovered classic of the period, pure pop".

A second Blanket of Secrecy album was recorded back in the 1980s but remained unheard until 2017, when it was released electronically by Trick Records.

== Vangelis collaboration ==
Marsh worked closely with Greek film composer Vangelis in the early 1980s. He released a single, "Don't Be Foolish", backed with "It Doesn't Matter" in 1981 (Polydor Records) which was co-written and produced by Vangelis and recorded at Nemo Studios. Marsh sang on the 1980 Vangelis album See You Later, which has been described as "a futuristic look through Vangelis' eyes at life after a nuclear holocaust, the inside cover depicting a man wearing a gas mask and carrying a body." According to Mark J.T. Griffin, "The mood of the work has an uncanny resemblance to the brooding atmosphere of the movie Blade Runner." On the first track of the album, "I Can't Take It Anymore", Marsh's voice is synthesized through a Roland VP330 vocoder.

Marsh also sang on "My Love", a Vangelis single backed with "Domestic Logic 1", which preceded the See You Later album; both titles being similar in production and style, although neither made it onto the album.

== Other Marsh collaborations ==
- Marsh released the single "You Say You Wanna Love Me" (1981), which was produced by Godley & Creme, with music and lyrics by Marsh, on Polydor Records. The B-side, "I Won't Let You Go" was written and produced by Marsh.
- Marsh worked as a session singer for Manfred Mann's Earth Band, featuring in several tracks on Chance (1980), on which he sang the lead vocal for "Stranded" (Mike Heron, Manfred Mann).
- Nick Lowe's Abominable Showman (1983) featured "Cool Reaction", a track co-written by Marsh and Andy Howell. Marsh is also credited as backing vocals on several The Abominable Showman tracks including "Paid the Price" and "Tanque-Rae".
- Marsh worked with Carlene Carter on the album C'est C Bon along with his Blanket of Secrecy partners, Roger Bechirian and Andrew Howell.

== Cover versions of Marsh's music ==
- Soul singer Jimmy Ruffin covered "Easy to Say I Love You", written by Marsh with Marshall and McKenna, in 1989 on PWL Records.
- Disco singer Hazell Dean covered Marsh's song (co-written with Bill Clift) "In Harmony", which was produced by Stock Aitken Waterman in 1988.

== The Peter Marsh Band (London) ==
During the 1990s, Marsh built a recording studio in Greenwich, London, which was used primarily by other musicians. Marsh wrote and produced an album during this time, "Water Under the Bridge", which was not released until 2021. The album was recorded on a Fostex 8-track reel-to-reel recorder, initially live in a studio and then edited in Paul Gunn's home studio.

The Peter Marsh Band gigged regularly in pubs and music venues in S.E. London. The band included Paul Gunn (the original drummer from Squeeze) and Steve 'Boltz' Bolton (ex Atomic Rooster) played lead guitar on some tracks.

== The Peter Marsh (all-French band) ==
In 2006, Marsh moved to France and worked briefly with American jazz musician Tomko. Marsh formed the all-French band, The Peter Marsh, which toured throughout France. Band members included Chateauroux music professor Pascal Freslon (best known as Calhoun), Jean Charles Bavouzet and jazz violinist Caroline Bugala. Marsh built a studio in France, close to Chateauroux.

== Solo albums ==
Marsh released the album Stop the Clock in 2013. A number of songs from the album were featured in the Hong Kong hit TV series Triumph in the Skies. A compilation album, Fly with Love, featured eleven Peter Marsh songs and was released on the Universal Music label. Marsh co-wrote most of the tracks with Pascal Fresion (Calhoun). The album was recorded at Marsh's studio near Châteauroux, in France. Marsh engineered and produced the entire album. All instruments were played by Marsh or Freslon with all vocals by Marsh.

In 2017, Marsh released the album Back to the Beginning. The album was notable for a renewed collaboration with Roger Bechirian (as producer). It also featured a number of songs co-written with Pascal Freslon (Calhoun).

Water Under the Bridge, which had been recorded in the 1990s, was eventually released in 2021. Written and produced by Peter Marsh, who performs acoustic guitar as well as vocals, this album also featured Ron Chadwick (bass guitar), Steve 'Boltz' Bolton (lead guitar), Steve Whitefield (guitar) and Paul Gunn (drums).

Soul Searching, a solo album inspired by soul and Northern Soul music, with lyrics co-written ny Dave Hockley, was released in 2024.

Cuddle Up: A Song for Children and Young People with Charles Bonnet Syndrome was released as a single in 2025 jointly with Esme's Umbrella, a UK charity which provides support for people living with Charles Bonnet Syndrome (CBS) and which promotes awareness of the condition. Cuddle Up was released to promote awareness of CBS in children who have lost some, or all, of their eyesight.

== Discography ==
Nicol & Marsh / Easy Street

- Nicol & Marsh's Easy Street (LP) (1974)
- "I've Been Praying" (single) (1974)
- "Midnight Cat" (single) (1974)
- "Sinking Down" (single) (1975)
- Easy Street (LP) (1976)
- "I've Been Loving You" (single) (1976)
- "Feels Like Heaven" (single) (1976)
- Under the Glass (LP) (1977)
- "Flying" (single) (1977)
- Nicol and Marsh (LP) (1978)
- "Hurt By Love" (single) (1978)
- "Streets of the Angels" (single) (1978)

Twist

- This Is Your Life (LP) (1979)
- "This Is Your Life" (single) (1979)

Blanket of Secrecy

- Walls Have Ears (LP) (1982)
- Blanket of Secrecy 2 (digital release) (2017)

Marsh & Vangelis

- "My Love" (single) (1980)
- See You Later (album) (1980)
- "Don't Be Foolish" (single) (1981)

Godley & Creme

- "You Say You Wanna Love Me" (single) (1981)

Manfred Mann's Earth Band

- Chance (album) (1980)

Nick Lowe

- Abominable Showman (album) (1983)

Peter Marsh / The Peter Marsh Band

- Stop the Clock (album) (2014)
- Fly with Love (album) (2014)
- "Fly Away" (charity single) (2016)
- Back to the Beginning (album) (2017)
- Anything About Love (single) (2018)
- Christmas Tree (single) (2018)
- Do You Believe in Christmas? (single) (2018)
- Water Under the Bridge (single, originally recorded in the 1990s) (2019)
- Water Under the Bridge (album, originally recorded in the 1990s) (2021)
- Soul Searching (album) (2024)
- Cuddle Up: A Song for Children and Young People with Charles Bonnet Syndrome (single) (2025). Released jointly with Esme's Umbrella.
