= Plain Spoken =

Studio album by John Mellencamp
- Released: September 23, 2014
- Recorded: 2014
- Studios: Belmont Mall, (Belmont, Indiana)
- Genres: Americana; folk rock; roots rock; heartland rock
- Length: 43:40
- Label: Republic

John Mellencamp chronology
Performs Trouble No More Live at Town Hall (2014)	Plain Spoken (2014)	Sad Clowns & Hillbillies (2017)

Professional ratings
Review scores
Source	Rating
Pop-Topia	5/5 stars
Team Rock	6/10 stars
Rolling Stone	3.5/5 stars
New York Daily News	3/4 stars
AllMusic	3.5/5 stars
PopMatters	6/10 stars

Plain Spoken is the 22nd studio album by American singer-songwriter and musician John Mellencamp. It was released on September 23, 2014 by Republic Records. Plain Spoken marks the first project of Mellencamp's new lifetime recording contract with Republic Records. The album's cover photo was taken by actress Meg Ryan.

== Recording and production ==
Mellencamp began recording the album in January 2014 at his Belmont Mall Studio in Belmont, Indiana. In late 2013, Mellencamp told Rolling Stone magazine: "I've got a notebook with 85 new songs that I've written for my next record. T Bone Burnett is going to come out to Indiana sometime in early January and we're gonna go into the studio for however long it takes to make a new album. I haven't done one in five years". Burnett, who had produced Mellencamp's previous two studio albums and the soundtrack to his musical Ghost Brothers of Darkland County, was credited only as "executive producer" in the album's liner notes; the album lists no credit for "producer".

== Music and lyrics ==
The 10 songs on Plain Spoken tackle a wide variety of subject matter, with some songs taking on a personal tone, some dealing with society problems in the 21st century, and others serving as character sketches of down and out and troubled people.

Of the lead track "Troubled Man," Mellencamp told SiriusXM radio: "'Troubled Man' is a song that I've been toying with since the early '90s. I tried to write it in '91, and then I found that I tried to write it again in 2004, but I was just in my own way, so the song never did make it. The older I get the more I realize that if I just get out of the way of these songs and let the songs come to me, they turn out so much better and not insert John Mellencamp".

"Sometimes There's God" is described by Mellencamp as, "Not so much a religious song but more about the feeling of inner peace and being able to identify happiness, disappointment without blaming it all on God." The phrase “Sometimes there’s God” was uttered by the character Blanche DuBois in A Streetcar Named Desire, one of Mellencamp’s favorite plays/movies.

Mellencamp described "The Isolation of Mister" as "a song about men and how we rationalize and isolate ourselves from our regrets and mistakes."

"Blue Charlotte" is a folk-based acoustic love song sung from the perspective of a man spending his final days with his dying wife. "I really don't know what 'Blue Charlotte' is about", Mellencamp told iHeart Radio in September 2014. "I don't know anybody in that situation. I don't know about people who love each other until death do they part. I don't know anything about it. So all I can figure is that Tennessee Williams sent me that thing."

On "The Courtesy of Kings," Mellencamp told iHeart radio: "It's a real old American expression that people used to say to each other back in the 1800s. Like a father would say to his son, 'Now make sure you show the guy the courtesy of kings.' In other words, be respectful, keep your word. If I said I would meet you at 7:00 and I showed up at 7:15, that is not the courtesy of kings. Showing up at five 'til 7, waiting for the other person, is the courtesy of kings. So it's an old, old, old saying that I had heard as a child. It was in my head – I heard my grandfather say it once or twice... The song is about a woman who wanted to show the courtesy of kings, but she just couldn't do it."

"Lawless Times," the album's closing track, rails against the various aspects of today's society that seem less than moral, from "creepers tapping on your cell phone" to the widespread digital theft of music ("If you wanna steal this song/It can be easily loaded down"). "'Lawless Times' is kind of a light-hearted look at our society today", Mellencamp explained to SiriusXM radio. "There was about 25 verses to this song, and I had to go out and decide which ones were going to stay on the record and which ones weren't. So I tried to make a point, but make it in a light manner and not be preachy or condescending or angry... I think the idea was inspired by [John] Steinbeck."

== Promotion ==
"Troubled Man," which Mellencamp debuted during his brief summer tour in June and July 2014, was the album's first single. It went on sale at iTunes on August 19, 2014 and impacted radio on September 8.

On September 10, 2014, Mellencamp announced plans for what was initially scheduled to be an 80-date Plain Spoken tour that hit most major areas in the United States and Canada. The tour began on January 21, 2015 and concluded its 2015 legs on August 4. Mellencamp added two additional legs to the tour in the spring and fall of 2016, with each leg hitting secondary markets on the East Coast and in the Midwest. This brought the total tally to over 100 shows.

Carlene Carter served as the opening act at every show on the tour and a portion of the ticket proceeds from the finale of the 2015 portion of the tour held in Indianapolis at the Bankers Life Fieldhouse were donated to the Riley Children's Foundation, which supports Riley Hospital for Children

== Track listing ==
All songs written by John Mellencamp.

1. "Troubled Man" – 4:14
2. "Sometimes There's God" – 4:34
3. "The Isolation of Mister" – 5:35
4. "The Company of Cowards" – 3:52
5. "Tears in Vain" – 3:53
6. "The Brass Ring" – 5:37
7. "Freedom of Speech" – 3:53
8. "Blue Charlotte" – 4:40
9. "The Courtesy of Kings" – 3:33
10. "Lawless Times" – 3:52

== Personnel ==
- Andy York – acoustic guitar, electric guitar
- Mike Wanchic – acoustic guitar, electric guitar
- T Bone Burnett – electric guitar
- John Gunnell – bass
- Dane Clark – drums
- Miriam Sturm – violin
- Troye Kinnett – keyboards

== Charts ==
Chart (2014)	Peak position
Canadian Albums (Billboard)	19
German Albums (Offizielle Top 100)	84
Italian Albums (FIMI)	97
Swiss Albums (Schweizer Hitparade)	58
US Billboard 200	18
US Americana/Folk Albums (Billboard)	2
US Digital Albums (Billboard)	9
US Top Rock Albums (Billboard)	5
US Indie Store Album Sales (Billboard)	13
