= Say You Will =

Say You Will may refer to:

- Say You Will (album), a 2003 album by Fleetwood Mac
  - "Say You Will" (Fleetwood Mac song)
- "Say You Will" (Foreigner song), 1987
- "Say You Will" (Kanye West song), 2008
- "Say You Will", a 2014 song by Billy Gilman
- "Say You Will", a 1980 song by Blanket of Secrecy
- "Say You Will", a 2004 song by Brandy from Afrodisiac
- "Say You Will", a 1977 song by Eddie Henderson
- "Say You Will", a 1963 song by Jackie Wilson
- "Say You Will", a 2020 song by Kygo from Golden Hour
- "Say You Will", a 1987 song by Mick Jagger
- "Say You Will", a 1988 song by Starpoint
- Say You Will (film), a 2017 film starring Travis Tope
