= Sad Clowns & Hillbillies =

Album by John Mellencamp

Studio album by John Mellencamp with Carlene Carter
- Released: April 28, 2017
- Recorded: December 2015–February 2016
- Studios: Belmont Mall (Belmont, Indiana)
- Genre: Roots rock
- Length: 46:38
- Label: Republic
- Producer: John Mellencamp

John Mellencamp chronology
Plain Spoken (2014)	Sad Clowns & Hillbillies (2017)	Plain Spoken: From the Chicago Theatre (2018)

Carlene Carter chronology
Carter Girl (2014)	Sad Clowns & Hillbillies (2017)

Professional ratings
Aggregate scores
Source	Rating
AnyDecentMusic?	6.9/10
Metacritic	77/100
Review scores
Source	Rating
AllMusic	3.5/5 stars
The Arts Desk	3/5 stars
The Guardian	3/5 stars
Paste	8.4/10 stars
Stereoboard	4/5 stars
Glide Magazine	9/10 stars
Renowned for Sound	4.5/5 stars
Classic Rock Magazine	3.5/5 stars

Sad Clowns & Hillbillies is the 23rd studio album by American singer-songwriter and musician John Mellencamp. It was released on April 28, 2017 by Republic Records. The album includes significant contributions from Carlene Carter, who gets a “featuring” designation in the albums’s credits. She sang on about half the songs, wrote one song and cowrote another. Carter had previously worked with Mellencamp on the 2015 film Ithaca, the movie he scored for Meg Ryan. The movie’s track 'Sugar Hill Mountain' was included on Sad Clowns & Hillbillies. Carter opened every show of Mellencamp's 2015–2016 Plain Spoken Tour.

== Songs ==
Mellencamp and Carter gave the first glimpse into the project by debuting two songs ("Indigo Sunset" and "My Soul's Got Wings") live during their 2016 concerts, and Mellencamp released "Easy Target," his "reflection on the state of our country", on January 19, 2017 – the eve of the 2017 Presidential Inauguration. "My Soul's Got Wings" features music written by Mellencamp and lyrics written by folk legend Woody Guthrie, one of Mellencamp's heroes and primary influences.

Although initially billed as a duets album, Sad Clowns & Hillbillies does not strictly consist of duets. Mellencamp and Carter sing together on only five of the album's 13 songs. "Sad Clowns and Hillbillies is a wonderful conglomeration of [John's] songs and my songs", Carter told Pacific University. "Some are duets and some are by themselves – it's different, but really kind of the way John and I roll. We are very like-minded and on musical ground that really feels right. It's been quite a wonderful ride".

In 2016, Mellencamp told USA Today: "We wrote a couple of songs together, and she wrote some and I wrote some."

The album contains several songs Mellencamp originally wrote for other projects, including "Sugar Hill Mountain", which was originally written for Ithaca, and a pair of songs ("What Kind of Man Am I" and "You Are Blind") from Ghost Brothers of Darkland County. The album's second single, "Grandview", was written in the early 1990s by Mellencamp's cousin, Bobby Clark (Mellencamp has a co-writing credit – he contributed to the melody and the arrangement), who plays in a band in Indiana. Country star Martina McBride sings the song's bridge. McBride said of her involvement: "At that time... the head of both of our labels was Scott Borchetta and he just put it together. I was just thrilled to do it because [Mellencamp] has been a part of the soundtrack of my life".

"All Night Talk Radio" was originally recorded for potential inclusion on Mellencamp's 1996 album Mr. Happy Go Lucky but didn't make the final track listing. The version included on Sad Clowns & Hillbillies is from the mid-1990s Mr. Happy Go Lucky recording sessions, but Mellencamp added a few new elements to the recording, such as backing vocals from Carter.

There are also two covers songs on the album – the first is "Mobile Blue" from Mickey Newbury's 1971 album Frisco Mabel Joy, the second is the little-known 1970 Jerry Hahn Brotherhood folk song "Early Bird Cafe," which Mellencamp has covered at various times throughout his career on solo acoustic guitar. Mellencamp saw the Jerry Hahn Brotherhood open for Frank Zappa in the early 1970s at Middle Earth in Indianapolis and has had an affinity for "Early Bird Cafe" ever since. In 2009, he performed "Early Bird Cafe" solo acoustic on the NPR show Fresh Air and told host Teri Gross that it is his "party song."

== Song insights ==
Grandview: This ode to life in a trailer park was originally recorded by Mellencamp during the 1992/93 sessions for his Human Wheels album. The version on Sad Clowns & Hillbillies was recorded in late 1993, when Mellencamp held recording sessions for 6-8 new songs to be included on a box set that was going to be titled "Nothing Like We Planned" but was later scrapped. At the time, David Grissom, Mellencamp's guitar player on Whenever We Wanted and Human Wheels, had recently left the band. Mellencamp temporarily filled the void with former Guns N' Roses guitarist Izzy Stradlin, who was featured on "Grandview" and "Miss Missy", another song from the late 1993 sessions that ultimately wound up on Mellencamp's 1998 self-titled album. Also featured on "Grandview" and "Miss Missy" was former Tom Petty and the Heartbreakers drummer Stan Lynch, who at the time had recently parted ways with Petty and was called on to temporarily replace Kenny Aronoff, Mellencamp's primary drummer. Aronoff and Mellencamp were at odds at the time over Mellencamp's belief that Aronoff was taking on too much session work outside the band. Aronoff would later return to record two more albums with Mellencamp, 1994's Dance Naked and 1996's Mr. Happy Go Lucky, before leaving the band for good.

"That song was written many, many years ago by myself and my cousin, Bobby Clark", Mellencamp told American Songwriter magazine. "It's been hanging around the vault since forever. I'd pull it out and work on it now and then, but it never really worked. Finally on this record it seemed to gel". Mellencamp said during his iHeart Radio release party for Sad Clowns & Hillbillies, prior to duetting on the song with Clark: "Bob wrote the song, and it didn't really have a very good arrangement on it. The arrangement was not very good [laughs]. We tried to work on it... it took 25 years to get the song playable [laughs]. To give [Bobby] credit, the idea of the song was great. It was very humbling... like a guy said, 'It's the only time I've ever heard a song that makes living in a house trailer sound sexy.'"

Indigo Sunset: The only song on Sad Clowns & Hillbillies that Mellencamp and Carter wrote together, "Indigo Sunset" was started by Carter and finished by Mellencamp: "It was called 'I See You,' which, John goes, 'It sounds like the f---ing emergency room,'" Carter told the Bend Bulletin. "And I said, 'You're right, and I've known that.' And I knew I needed to change it, but I just thought – in fact, I didn't even think he was gonna even like the song 'Indigo Sunset.' So he titled it, and he changed it; he made it better. That's what I love about collaboration, is you can start with something and then carry it around for a long time, and you can't see your way to finishing it the way that it deserves to be finished. And so it became ours instead of just mine".

Mellencamp shared his insights into "Indigo Sunset" with American Songwriter magazine, saying he doesn't remember who wrote what parts of the song: "I don't keep track of that stuff. It's all done on the fly. It's all done in the studio. I can't remember who wrote what, but I think she probably wrote the bulk of the lyrics and I wrote the arrangements. We knew we didn't want to make a traditional duets record".

Mellencamp changed Carter's original line, "I close my eyes and I see you", to, "I see the sun setting on you".

Carter later added in a 2019 interview with Glide Magazine: "With 'Indigo Sunset,' he got a co-write on that, largely to do with the fact that he changed the title and the hook line: 'I see the sun setting on you,' and he changed like a chord in it. But basically that was a song that I had written that I didn’t think he was going to like because he doesn’t usually like romantic, warm and fuzzy loving songs, you know what I mean. He likes stuff with grit and real life matters. So I did co-write with him but not in the sense that we sat down and wrote a song together. He just kind of said, 'I think you should change this and do that;' and that’s sometimes what makes a song really the best that it can be."

Sugar Hill Mountain: Mellencamp's reference to "cigarette trees" in the song's opening and closing lines came from "Big Rock Candy Mountain", a song written by Harry McClintock in 1928 and covered by Burl Ives circa the 1950s/early 1960s. Mellencamp explained to Sound and Vision: "I wrote a song for Meg [Ryan's] movie (Ithaca) that Carlene Carter sings on this record. The line is something like, 'Sugar Hill, Sugar Hill Mountain, where's there's bubblegum and cigarette trees' – and that's straight from a Burl Ives song! Well, I don't think it was 'bubblegum,' but it was 'cigarette trees'. So I thought, 'Yeah, I'll use that!'"

Damascus Road: The only song on the album written solely by Carter, "Damascus Road" was conceived during the period when Sad Clowns & Hillbillies was going to contain original gospel tunes. "I ended up writing a song that ended up on the record that was intended to be on the gospel record, and that's 'Damascus Road,' and John just never got around to writing those songs", Carter told the Bend Bulletin. "But it came out just like it was supposed to. It's still got a very, very deep spiritual sense to it; the whole album does. It was an organic experience in that we found it easy to work in the studio together".

"For me, ('Damascus Road') was very autobiographical in a lot of ways – I can't say it was about a certain moment or anything, but I certainly have been at those crossroads before in my life", Carter said. "… I've taken long periods of time off, and that really had to do with burning out and then getting really messed up in my personal life and my addiction stuff, and publicly just basically imploding. Then, to be able to come back and earn my way back into this life that I love and not be pushed to the side again, I felt really great about that. I look at every day as a blessing that I'm even here".

Early Bird Cafe: Mellencamp offered an in-depth account to former USA Today and Rolling Stone writer Elysa Gardner during a May 1, 2017 interview in New York City about how this obscure song from the Jerry Hahn Brotherhood came into his life: "I saw a band when I was a teenager – I went to see a band called Frank Zappa and the Mothers of Invention, and the opening act was a band called Jerry Hahn Brotherhood. And they were just a bunch of hippies, you know – real long hair. No show, no presentation – guys just kind of walked out and started playing, which I appreciated. I wasn't much into the light shows and bombs and stuff. But anyway, they did two or three songs that I just went 'Wow, these songs are great.' So I went and bought their record. I was a hippie once upon a time. I had [long hair] – it was 1969, 1970, you know, barefoot with a guitar. You people that are old enough probably remember but you young people don't remember, but people used to have parties and you would pass the guitar around and all the guys would play a song. So whenever the guitar came my way I always played 'Early Bird Cafe' and then acted like I wrote it. So in my mind, finally, I did write it. It was my song. Because I would go places, "Hey John, play that 'Early Bird Cafe' song.' People just assumed I wrote it because, like you, they had never heard the record. So that song really became mine more than the guy that wrote it or Jerry Hahn Brotherhood, you know, 40 years ago. I've been playing it for 40 years, so we're making this record and I just finally....because the guys in the band have heard me play it a hundred times, I said, 'Lets just cut 'Early Bird Cafe.' And so that's what we did".

Mellencamp also told Gardner about his favorite part of the song, saying: "I love the last part of it where she says, 'She asked me where I'd been, and I said I was hung up with some beggar in the sky.' I thought that was a beautiful line. 'I was hung up with God – I was trying to find God' is what he's saying. I guess you guys figured that out, right?"

Mellencamp concluded: "I related to that song ever since I was like 17 years old".

Sad Clowns: Mellencamp told Brian Hiatt of Rolling Stone magazine: "As soon as I wrote that, I looked up and said, 'Thanks, Ray.' Because I know it's a Ray Davies song, like 'Sunny Afternoon' – a self-deprecating song".

My Soul's Got Wings: Mellencamp also told Gardner the story of how he set this Woody Guthrie poem to music: "Nora Guthrie called me up [in 2003] – for those who don't know, that's Woody's daughter – and asked if I would accept the Woody Guthrie Award and, of course, who wouldn't, so I said 'yes,' and ever since then her and I have been very friendly. She's always saying, 'Let me send you some of Woody's poetry and see if you can turn it into a song.' I said, 'Didn't someone else do a whole album of that?"... Wilco and Billy Bragg – they made an awfully good record using his poetry. So I thought, 'Well, I don't know, that's already been done.' But she's very persistent and she sent me four or five poems and, I don't know, it took about six minutes to put that together. It just came real quick. We were making the record and I hadn't written the music yet and I was walking out to the rehearsal room, which is right next to my studio, and I didn't even make it to rehearsal room and I just turned around and played it and we went in and recorded it. That's how long it took. I think we did like two takes and that was it.”

Easy Target: When debuting "Easy Target" on January 19, 2017, Mellencamp told Yahoo's Katie Couric: "I didn't even want to write the song. I know this sounds crazy, but it happens a lot, I think, to songwriters – you can't tell it by looking, but I was working out and all of a sudden I just started singing 'easy targets' and I thought, 'oh no, now I've got to stop what I'm doing' and it took me....you know, somebody just sent it to me and I just wrote it down. The melody came [intact], the lyrics.....as fast as I could write is how long it took me to write the whole song".

== Background ==
Mellencamp said Sad Clowns & Hillbillies was borne out of his collaboration with Carter on Ghost Brothers of Darkland County and Ithaca. He said through those two projects and their time on tour together that the two became "singing buddies". Mellencamp gave insight into the genesis of the project to Yahoo's Katie Couric when debuting "Easy Target" on January 19, 2017, saying: "It's crazy the way it started – it was going to be a religious record. It started out like 'Look, lets go back and do an old country religious record. We'll try to write songs that sound like those songs, but they'll be new.' And then it just kept evolving and evolving and evolving, and the songs that she was bringing and the songs that I was bringing – they weren't so religious. I write a lot of sad songs, so it's like Sad Clowns & Hillbillies – that's where it came from".

== Artwork ==
The artwork on the front cover of Sad Clowns & Hillbillies was taken from a 2005 Mellencamp painting called "Twelve Dreams". Mellencamp said he saw an article that reviewed of one of his painting exhibits where "Twelve Dreams" was "stripped" and he then thought it would work as the album's cover art. He told Jim Kerr of iHeart Radio: "It never really dawned on me to use it for an album cover, but I saw a review of one of my painting shows and they had stripped it like that – you know, just that stripe – and I thought, 'That looks good for the album cover.' Because they were talking to me about doing a photo session and I went, 'I don't want to do that.'"

This marks the first time since 1991's Whenever We Wanted that Mellencamp has displayed one of his paintings on an album cover.

== Tour ==
Mellencamp launched his Sad Clowns & Hillbillies Tour on June 5, 2017 in Denver, CO. The 2017 leg of the tour concluded on September 3 in Canfield, OH. Carter, Emmylou Harris, Jewel, and Lily & Madeleine served as supporting acts on the 2017 leg of the tour. Mellencamp finished the Sad Clowns & Hillbillies Tour with a run of Canadian shows that began September 26, 2018 in Moncton, New Brunswick and wrapped up on November 14 in Abbotsford, British Columbia. Carter did not accompany Mellencamp on the Canadian portion of the tour.

== Track listing ==
No.	Title	Writer(s)	Length
1.	"Mobile Blue"	Mickey Newbury	3:02
2.	"Battle of Angels"	John Mellencamp	3:56
3.	"Grandview" (featuring Martina McBride)	Mellencamp, Bobby Clark	3:52
4.	"Indigo Sunset" (featuring Carlene Carter)	Mellencamp, Carlene Carter	3:31
5.	"What Kind of Man Am I" (featuring Carlene Carter)	Mellencamp	4:06
6.	"All Night Talk Radio"	Mellencamp	5:08
7.	"Sugar Hill Mountain" (featuring Carlene Carter)	Mellencamp	3:05
8.	"You Are Blind"	Mellencamp	3:18
9.	"Damascus Road" (featuring Carlene Carter)	Carter	4:13
10.	"Early Bird Cafe"	Lane Tietgen	4:06
11.	"Sad Clowns"	Mellencamp	2:40
12.	"My Soul's Got Wings" (featuring Carlene Carter)	Mellencamp, Woody Guthrie	2:58
13.	"Easy Target"	Mellencamp	2:45

Target bonus tracks
No.	Title	Length
14.	"Grandview" (acoustic)	3:58
15.	"What Kind of Man Am I" (acoustic)	4:08

== Personnel ==
- John Mellencamp – lead vocals, background vocals, guitar
- Carlene Carter – duet vocals, background vocals
- Andy York – acoustic guitar, electric guitar
- Mike Wanchic – acoustic guitar, electric guitar
- John Gunnell – bass
- Dane Clark – drums
- Miriam Sturm – violin
- Troye Kinnett – keyboards, harmonica

Additional musicians

- Lily & Madeleine – background vocals ("What Kind of Man Am I")
- Christie Brinkley – background vocals ("What Kind of Man Am I")
- Toby Myers – electric bass ("Grandview" and "All Night Talk Radio")
- Stan Lynch – drums ("Grandview")
- Izzy Stradlin – electric guitar ("Grandview")
- Kenny Aronoff – drums and percussion ("All Night Talk Radio")

== Charts ==
Chart (2017)	Peak position
Austrian Albums (Ö3 Austria)	69
Belgian Albums (Ultratop Flanders)	102
Belgian Albums (Ultratop Wallonia)	150
German Albums (Offizielle Top 100)	52
Scottish Albums (Official Charts)	35
Swiss Albums (Schweizer Hitparade)	28
UK Albums (Official Charts)	78
US Billboard 200	11
