= The Abominable Showman =

Studio album by Nick Lowe
- Released: March 1983
- Studios: Rockfield (Wales, UK); Ampro (London, UK)
- Genres: Garage rock, pop, rock and roll
- Length: 35:07
- Labels: F-Beat (UK), Columbia (US)
- Producers: Roger Bechirian; Nick Lowe

Nick Lowe chronology
Nick the Knife (1982)	The Abominable Showman (1983)	Nick Lowe and His Cowboy Outfit (1984)

The Abominable Showman is the fourth solo album by the English singer-songwriter Nick Lowe, released in 1983. Lowe supported the album by touring with Paul Carrack.

The album was out of print for two decades until being reissued on CD and vinyl by Yep Roc Records on 14 July 2017. The reissue contained three bonus tracks.

== Critical reception ==
Professional ratings
Review scores
Source	Rating
AllMusic	2/5 stars
Robert Christgau	B+
The Rolling Stone Album Guide	3/5 stars
Spin Alternative Record Guide	4/10

The New York Times noted the "light but appealing funk, reggae and 1960's soul in addition to the expected garage-pop-and-roll."

== Track listing ==
All tracks are written by Nick Lowe, except where noted.

No.	Title	Writer(s)	Length
1.	"We Want Action"	Lowe, Carlene Carter	2:35
2.	"Ragin' Eyes"		2:38
3.	"Cool Reaction"	Pete Marsh, Andy Howell	2:35
4.	"Time Wounds All Heels"	Lowe, Carter, Simon Climie	2:42
5.	"Man of a Fool"		2:44
6.	"Tanque-Rae"		2:48
7.	"Wish You Were Here"		3:14
8.	"Chicken and Feathers"		2:44
9.	"Paid the Price"	Moon Martin	3:24
10.	"Mess Around with Love"		3:05
11.	"Saint Beneath the Paint"		2:48
12.	"How Do You Talk to an Angel"		3:50
Total length:			35:07

2017 Reissue Bonus tracks
No.	Title	Length
13.	"Pet You and Hold You" (live)	3:22
14.	"Crackin' Up" (live)	3:13
15.	"(What's So Funny 'Bout) Peace, Love, and Understanding?" (live)	3:37

Note: The packaging of the YepRoc reissue omits mention of "Pet You and Hold You" as a bonus track.

== Personnel ==
- Nick Lowe – vocals, guitars, bass
- Paul Carrack – keyboards, backing vocals, vocals (7)
- Martin Belmont – guitars
- James Eller – bass
- Bobby Irwin – drums, backing vocals
- Robert Kirby – string arrangements
- Carlene Carter – harmonies and harmonics (4)
- Simon Climie – harmonies and harmonics (4)
- Pete Marsh – backing vocals (6, 9)

Production

- Roger Bechirian – producer
- Nick Lowe – producer
- Paul Bass – engineer
- Paul Cobbold – engineer
- Keith Morris – photography

== Singles ==
Three songs were released as singles:

- "Raging Eyes" / "Tanque-Rae" ("Raging Eyes" was recorded in October 1981)
- "Cool Reaction" (Promo only)
- "Wish You Were Here" / "How Do You Talk to an Angel"
