= Easy From Now On =

Single by Emmylou Harris

from the album Quarter Moon in a Ten Cent Town
- B-side: "You’re Supposed to be Feeling Good"
- Released: 1978
- Genre: Country
- Length: 3:07
- Label: Warner Bros. Nashville
- Songwriter(s): Carlene Carter, Susanna Clark
- Producer(s): Brian Ahern

Emmylou Harris singles chronology
"Two More Bottles of Wine" (1978)	"Easy From Now On" (1978)	"Too Far Gone" (1978)

"Easy From Now On" is a song written by Carlene Carter and Susanna Clark, and recorded by American country music artist Emmylou Harris. It was released in 1978 as the second single from the album Quarter Moon in a Ten Cent Town. The song reached number 12 on the Billboard Hot Country Singles & Tracks chart. and number 5 on the RPM Canadian chart.

== Background ==
Susannah Clark called her friend Carter with the line "Quarter Moon in a Ten Cent Town" from which the song originated. Carter played the finished song for Emmylou Harris, who included it as the first track on the album, Quarter Moon in a Ten Cent Town. A painting by Clark, also an artist, of a crescent moon over a dark road serves as the album's cover. The song launched Carter's career as a songwriter and opened doors for her as a performer.

The song is included on the album Profile: Best of Emmylou Harris, also released in 1978.

== Legacy ==
Country artist Miranda Lambert covered the song for her second studio album Crazy Ex-Girlfriend. Lambert has stated that the line "When the mornin' comes and it's time for me to leave/Don't worry about me, I got a wild card up my sleeve" has resonated with her, and served as inspiration for the title of her 2019 studio album, Wildcard. Lambert's second single from the album, "Bluebird", prominently features the lyric "I've got a wildcard up my sleeve" in the chorus.

Americana Band Watchhouse (formerly Mandolin Orange) have cited the song as an influence, calling it a “smart and perfect country song.”

In a list of cozy songs for autumn, Rolling Stone magazine called the song "gorgeous" and "great for a midnight drive."

== Additional cover versions ==
- Country artist Suzy Bogguss recorded the song in 1981 for her first album Suzy on independent record label Old Shack Recording.
- Co-writer Carlene Carter recorded the song for her 1990 album I Fell in Love. The song also appears on Carter's compilation album Hindsight 20/20.
- Country artist Terri Clark covered the song for her 2000 album Fearless

== Charts ==
Chart (1978)	Peak position
US Hot Country Songs (Billboard)	12
Canadian RPM Country Tracks	5
