= One Love (Carlene Carter song) =

Single by Carlene Carter

from the album I Fell in Love
- B-side: "Easy from Now On"
- Released: August 10, 1991
- Genre: Country
- Length: 3:04
- Label: Reprise
- Songwriters: Carlene Carter, Howie Epstein, Perry Lamek
- Producer: Howie Epstein

Carlene Carter singles chronology
"The Sweetest Thing" (1991)	"One Love" (1991)	"Every Little Thing" (1993)

"One Love" is a song co-written and recorded by American country music artist Carlene Carter. It was released in August 1991 as the fourth single from the album I Fell in Love. The song reached number 33 on the Billboard Hot Country Singles & Tracks chart. It was written by Carter, Howie Epstein, and Perry Lamek.

== Chart performance ==
Chart (1991)	Peak position
Canada Country Singles (RPM)	17
US Hot Country Songs (Billboard)	33
