= Carter Girl =

Studio album by Carlene Carter
- Released: April 8, 2014
- Recorded: Nashville, Hollywood, West Los Angeles
- Genres: Country, Americana
- Length: 46:09
- Label: Rounder Records
- Producer: Don Was

Carlene Carter chronology
Stronger (2008)	Carter Girl (2014)	Sad Clowns & Hillbillies (2017)

Carter Girl is the tenth studio album by American country music singer Carlene Carter. It is her first release since 2008's Stronger, as well as her first album for Rounder Records. All twelve tracks on the album were written or co-written by a member of the Carter Family, with the majority being composed by Carlene's granduncle A.P. Carter.

== Reception ==
Professional ratings
Aggregate scores
Source	Rating
Metacritic	81/100
Review scores
Source	Rating
AllMusic	4/5 stars
Blurt	4/5 stars
Exclaim!	7/10
The Guardian	4/5 stars
Mojo	5/5 stars
PopMatters	8/10
Q	3/5 stars
Record Collector	3/5 stars
Tom Hull	B+
Uncut	8/10

Carter Girl received positive critical acclaim, with Robin Denselow from UK publication The Guardian giving the album 4 out of 5 stars and saying "[Carter] has done her justice to her history", highlighting how the songs of the Carter Family have been revived with "intensity and emotion", specifically on the track "Long Black Train" which Carter has given "new maturity". Denselow also praises producer Don Was who has "captured the energy [Carter] showed in the late 1970s when she recorded in London". Similarly, Rolling Stone Country reported that "the two original tracks on the record alone are worth the price of admission", calling Me And The Wildwood Rose a "sweetly moving tribute to Carter's grandparents, Maybelle and Ezra, told through childhood memories" Actually, it's a song about her younger sister, the Wildwood Rose, who died unexpectedly. Metacritic also chose Me And The Wildwood Rose as the top track from the album, which was rated 81 based on 10 reviews, indicating universal acclaim. Mojo called Carter Girl "unashamedly traditional, committed, personal and really quite perfect". The Boston Globe suggesting that "this may be the best album the Carter Girl has ever made". Similarly, AllMusic explained that "Carlene Carter has confronted the mightly legacy of the Carter Family songbook and allowed it to strengthen her music rather than buckling under its weight, and this ranks with her finest recorded work to date". Regarding the Carter Family, PopMatters state that Carter Girl is responsible for maintaining and extending their legacy "without falsehood or artifice of any kind". Blurt Magazine awarded the album 4 out of 5 stars, explaining that Carlene "long ago proved herself worthy of the family legacy", adding that "Carter Girl would be a highlight of her substantial discography regardless of a familial stamp".

== Track listing ==
No.	Title	Writer(s)	Length
1.	"Little Black Train"	A.P. Carter	2:49
2.	"Give Me The Roses"	A.P. Carter	3:28
3.	"Me And The Wildwood Rose"	Carlene Carter	4:30
4.	"Blackie's Gunman" (featuring Elizabeth Cook)	A.P. Carter	4:23
5.	"I'll Be All Smiles Tonight"	A.P. Carter	4:47
6.	"Poor Old Heartsick Me"	Helen Carter	2:41
7.	"Troublesome Waters" (featuring Willie Nelson)	Ezra Carter, Maybelle Carter, Dixie Hall	5:18
8.	"Lonesome Valley 2003" (featuring Vince Gill)	Al Anderson, A.P. Carter, Carlene Carter	5:28
9.	"Tall Lover Man"	June Carter Cash	3:55
10.	"Gold Watch And Chain"	A.P. Carter	3:17
11.	"Black Jack David" (featuring Kris Kristofferson)	A.P. Carter	2:49
12.	"I Ain't Gonna Work Tomorrow" (featuring The Carter Family)	A.P. Carter	2:44

== Personnel ==
Credits adapted from AllMusic.

- Jim Bessman – liner notes
- Paul Blakemore – mastering
- Joe Breen – background vocals
- Sam Bush – mandolin
- Carlene Carter – lead vocals, background vocals, acoustic guitar, piano, photography
- Marina Chavez – photography
- Bob Clearmountain – mixing
- Jack Clement – acoustic guitar
- Larissa Collins – art direction
- Elizabeth Cook – harmony vocals (track 4), background vocals (tracks 1, 5, 6 and 10)
- Greg Gartenbaum – engineering
- Vince Gill – harmony vocals (track 8)
- Rami Jaffee – keyboard, organ, piano
- Jim Keltner – drums, percussion
- Kris Kristofferson – duet vocals (track 11)
- Greg Leisz – steel guitar, electric guitar, acoustic guitar
- Tiffany Anastasia Lowe – personal assistant
- Val McCallum – electric guitar
- Blake Mills – acoustic guitar, electric guitar
- Willie Nelson – duet vocals, guitar (track 7)
- Mickey Raphael – harmonica
- Matt Rausch – engineering
- Sergio Ruelas Jr – mixing
- Wesley Seidman – engineering
- Ivy Skoff – production co-ordination
- Donna Tracy – photography
- Don Was – production, bass
- Clinton Welander – engineering
- Gerald Wenner – photography
- Chris Wilkinson – engineering
- Howard Willing – engineering

The Carter Family – duet and harmony vocals (track 10)

- Anita Carter
- Helen Carter
- June Carter Cash
- Lorrie Carter Bennett
- Johnny Cash
