= The Sweetest Thing (Carlene Carter song) =

Single by Carlene Carter

from the album I Fell in Love
- B-side: "Goodnight Dallas"
- Released: March 16, 1991
- Genre: Country
- Length: 4:13
- Label: Reprise
- Songwriters: Carlene Carter, Robert Ellis Orrall
- Producer: Howie Epstein

Carlene Carter singles chronology
"Come On Back" (1990)	"The Sweetest Thing" (1991)	"One Love" (1991)

"The Sweetest Thing" is a song co-written and recorded by American country music artist Carlene Carter. It was released in March 1991 as the third single from the album I Fell in Love. The song reached number 25 on the Billboard Hot Country Singles & Tracks chart. It was written by Carter and Robert Ellis Orrall.

== Chart performance ==
Chart (1991)	Peak position
Canada Country Singles (RPM)	8
US Hot Country Songs (Billboard)	25

=== Year-end charts ===
Chart (1991)	Position
Canada Country Tracks (RPM)	97
