= Stronger (Carlene Carter album) =

Studio album by Carlene Carter
- Released: March 4, 2008
- Genre: Country
- Label: Yep Roc
- Producer: John McFee

Carlene Carter chronology
Little Acts of Treason (1995)	Stronger (2008)	Carter Girl (2014)

Professional ratings
Review scores
Source	Rating
Allmusic	4/5 stars

Stronger is an album released in 2008 by American country music singer Carlene Carter. Included is "I'm So Cool," a song originally recorded on Carter's 1980 album, Musical Shapes.

== Track listing ==
All tracks composed by Carlene Carter; except where indicated

1. "The Bitter End" (Carter, Mark Winchester) – 3:20
2. "Why Be Blue" – 2:55
3. "To Change Your Heart" – 4:17
4. "Bring Love" – 3:43
5. "I'm So Cool" – 3:21
6. "Spider Lace" – 3:37
7. "On To You" – 3:07
8. "Judgement Day" – 4:27
9. "Break My Little Heart in Two" – 2:46
10. "It Takes One to Know Me" – 3:15
11. "Light of Your Love" – 2:56
12. "Stronger" – 5:03

A 13th track, "When the Long Road Ends", was made available for download by Yep Roc Records until March 4, 2009 for purchasers of a limited edition CD pressing.

== Chart performance ==
Chart (2008)	Peak position
U.S. Billboard Top Country Albums	69
