= Love Like This (Kennedy Rose song) =

1990 song by Kennedy Rose, also recorded by Carlene Carter

Single by Kennedy Rose

from the album hai ku
- B-side: "Faithful"
- Released: 1990
- Genre: Folk rock
- Length: 3:47
- Label: IRS
- Songwriters: Mary Ann Kennedy; Pam Rose; Pat Bunch
- Producers: Mary Ann Kennedy; Pam Rose; Tom Harding

Kennedy Rose singles chronology
"Love Like This" (1990)	"The Only Chain" (1990)

"Love Like This" is a song written by American songwriters Mary Ann Kennedy, Pam Rose, and Pat Bunch. It was originally recorded by the former two as the duo Kennedy Rose on their 1990 album hai ku. Five years later, American singer Carlene Carter released a version from her 1995 album Little Acts of Treason.

== History ==
Kennedy Rose, a duo consisting of songwriters Mary Ann Kennedy and Pam Rose, originally recorded the song on their 1989 album hai ku for I.R.S. Records. Kennedy and Rose wrote the song with Pat Bunch.

An uncredited review in Music & Media magazine called the song "folk rock with an easygoing and friendly air." In a review of the album for The Macon Telegraph, Marty Berry stated that the song mixed elements of folk rock and country music through its use of power chords and mandolin while also praising the duo's vocal harmony. Jim Ridley later wrote in New Country magazine that the song was an "irresistible pop ballad" that "conquered the nation's progressive FM stations".

== Carlene Carter version ==
"Love Like This"

Single by Carlene Carter

from the album Little Acts of Treason
- B-side: "One Tender Night"
- Released: August 8, 1995
- Genre: Country
- Length: 3:21
- Label: Giant
- Songwriters: Mary Ann Kennedy; Pam Rose; Pat Bunch
- Producers: Carlene Carter; James Stroud

Carlene Carter singles chronology
"Rockin' Little Christmas" (1994)	"Love Like This" (1995)	"Hurricane" (1995)

Carlene Carter covered the song in 1995 on her album Little Acts of Treason. Her rendition was released on August 8, 1995, as the album's first single. Although it was one of three songs on the album which she did not write, she co-produced the track with James Stroud. An uncredited review in Billboard stated that the song "should find radio welcoming this talented lady back to the airwaves with open arms" and "this single has a fresh, inviting sound."

=== Chart performance ===
Chart (1995)	Peak position
US Hot Country Songs (Billboard)	70
Canadian RPM Country Tracks	54

== Other versions ==
Blackhawk covered the song on their 1994 self-titled debut album.
