= Come On Back =

Single by Carlene Carter

from the album I Fell in Love
- B-side: "The Leavin' Side"
- Released: September 26, 1990
- Genre: Country
- Length: 2:56
- Label: Reprise
- Songwriter: Carlene Carter
- Producer: Howie Epstein

Carlene Carter singles chronology
"I Fell in Love" (1990)	"Come On Back" (1990)	"The Sweetest Thing" (1991)

"Come On Back" is a song written and recorded by American country music artist Carlene Carter. It was released in September 1990 as the second single from her album I Fell in Love. The song reached number 3 on the Billboard Hot Country Singles & Tracks chart in January 1991.

== Chart performance ==
Chart (1990–1991)	Peak position
Canada Country Singles (RPM)	2
US Hot Country Songs (Billboard)	3

=== Year-end charts ===
Chart (1991)	Position
Canada Country Tracks (RPM)	48
US Country Songs (Billboard)	42
