= Gwen Hughes =

American singer, songwriter and actress

- Born: Greenville, South Carolina, U.S.
- Genres: Jazz; electronic dance music
- Occupations: Singer; songwriter; actress
- Years active: 1997–present
- Member of: The Retro Jazz Kats; The Continental Dance Orchestra; The Global Jazz Gang (Mono)
- Education: Furman University

Gwen Hughes is an American jazz singer, songwriter and actress. Primarily based in Atlanta, Georgia, she has developed a fan base both regionally and abroad with her jazz-flavored ensembles, including The Retro Jazz Kats, The Continental Dance Orchestra, and the European-based Mono (also known as The Global Jazz Gang).

== Early life ==
Hughes was born in Greenville, South Carolina, where she attended Furman University. After graduating, the lure of jazz began to pull her away from her theatre beginnings. She was soon sitting in with bands all around Atlanta. As she told Points North magazine, "I just found myself thrilled with the spontaneity of the jazz form. I loved the democracy of it, loved being in a band, really relying on each other." In contrast to the structure of theatre, jazz offered a liberating freedom to Hughes that would, in time, be infused into all of her music: "I'm a fusion artist, I suppose … a fusion of ... rock 'n' roll and jazz."

== Music career ==
=== 1997–2000 ===
Hughes released her first CD, Torch Life, in 1997, and exploded onto the Southeast music scene. She rode the "swing" craze of the late 1990s, creating her trademark "Kool Kat Lounge-a-Go-Go" show that featured jugglers, cigarette girls, magicians, and comedians in addition to her band, The Retro Jazz Kats. She and The Kats clinched the title of "Favorite Jazz Artist" multiple times from Creative Loafing magazine. Author Philip DePoy also created the jazz-singing character "Gwen Hughes" in his 1999 novel Dancing Made Easy, part of his Flap Tucker detective series. The Atlanta Journal-Constitution declared, "Gwen Hughes was swinging before swinging was cool."

=== 2001–2004 ===
Hughes released two more albums in 2001. Lost and Found solidified her reputation as a songwriter. The Misplaced Martini, an album of jazz standards, including "Caravan", was recorded live at Sambuca Jazz Cafe and garnered national radio airplay. Martini also featured a recording of "Mood Indigo", recorded in the cosmetics section of Parisian department store.

Hughes began making an international splash after self-funded trips to Paris, Prague, and Istanbul. It was during a Croatian tour in 2004 that Hughes met Slovenian drummer Tomi Purich (of Jan Plestenjak and Nina Pušlar). Purich believed in Hughes's ability to connect with European musicians and audiences alike and began managing and booking Gwen Hughes and the Global Jazz Gang (renamed Mono in 2013) all throughout Eastern Europe. Since 2004, Gwen and the EU band have built a devoted following through more than 14 tours of the continent. In 2015 and 2016, the band was invited to tour Slovenia on behalf of the U.S. Embassy in Ljubljana. Former U.S. Ambassador Joseph A. Mussomeli wrote, "I sometimes worry that she and her band did more to better bilateral relations than I ever could have hoped to achieve as the US ambassador!"

=== 2004–2007 ===
When the swing craze began to die down, Hughes returned to her love of minimalist music, modeled after personal favorite Cassandra Wilson. Her next album reflected that, releasing Instead of Light in 2007. Partnering with Wilson's mix producer (of the Grammy-winning New Moon Daughter) Danny Kopelson, plus Drew Young (formerly of Putumayo Records), the album cemented Gwen's place as "the love child of Hank Williams and Peggy Lee … her southern heritage weaves through her lounge-dwelling persona like kudzu around a fencepost." The album featured Hughes's version of "Whole Lotta Love", paired with Willie Dixon's "You Need Love".

=== 2008–present ===
In 2010, Hughes created her first 14-piece big band, The Continental Dance Orchestra, which had the honor of playing at Asheville, North Carolina's historic Grove Park Inn for the 25th anniversary of their "Swing Dance Weekend" in 2011. Later that year, CDO appeared on the first annual TCM Classic Movie Cruise, sailing from Miami to Mexico, where the band played romantic dance music for classic stars Eva Marie Saint, the late Ernest Borgnine, and Tippi Hedren.

Hughes's music was also featured in television and movies, including PBS's Road Trip Nation and films such as Crazy Eyes. She appeared in 2009 singing on TBS's House of Payne. Her voice and music is also featured in the soundtrack of independent films We Three Kings (2001) and Take Me Out (2011). In 2016, her voice was the a cappella soundtrack to Down South, the award-winning short film about the late Black Lives Matter activist Marshawn McCarrel.

2013 saw the limited release of Gwen & Mono (the EU touring band)'s CD, Dancing in the Moonlight. In 2016, Gwen was signed to Zoho Music and released Native Land, an Americana-flavored project on Zoho Roots. In 2019, Hughes stepped into the EDM market with the new release on Fairfield Records, "I'd Know Your Voice Anywhere (Mark Alston Deep House Remix)".

Hughes's recent projects on the Tiger Turn label are a continuing series of public domain church hymns reframed in jazz arrangements: "We Gather Together: Jazz Hymns for Thanksgiving" and "In the Garden: Jazz Hymns for Easter".

== Acting career ==
Though Hughes's theatre performances were infrequent, they were always highly lauded. She appeared as "Jenny Diver" in Theatrical Outfit's production of The Beggar's Opera in 1995, making "the art of bawdy wenching highly watchable." In 1998, she was cast in Appalachian Strings at Theatre in the Square, a performance acclaimed by The Atlanta Journal-Constitution: "Gwen Hughes sings like an angel…you will remember Gwen Hughes." A long non-theatre period followed due to her tour schedule in Europe. However, in 2007, she was cast in Always, Patsy Cline in the largely non-singing role of "Louise." Yet another non-theatre period followed, but in 2011, she auditioned for Ghost Brothers of Darkland County, a world premiere musical from John Mellencamp and Stephen King. She garnered the attention of T Bone Burnett, the show's music director, which resulted in her understudying Tony-nominee Emily Skinner. She thus appeared opposite Tony-winner Shuler Hensley multiple times as the mother, "Monique McCandless," as well as lending her voice to the Ghost ensemble. Variety wrote of the show, "It takes more than a groove and gore to make this tedious tale of brotherly bile work on stage. Sketchy character development, awkward staging and unclear storytelling make prospects for future life iffy beyond this world preem at Atlanta's Alliance Theater. …" Despite the mixed reviews, though, the play was remounted as a reading in New York in September, 2012 with Hughes invited back as Skinner's understudy and acting opposite film veterans Bruce Greenwood and Joe Morton. A national tour of the show occurred in the fall 2013. Another tour, this time of major markets from coast to coast, occurred in 2015.

Television appearances include: Dead Silent: The Curse of Dismal Creek (Investigation ID, 2016); Stan Against Evil (IFC, 2016) and Murder Comes to Town (Investigation ID, airing 2017). She had a cameo as a polka bandleader in Donald Glover's Atlanta in 2018. Recently, Hughes appeared opposite Monica Raymund in the final season of Hightown.

== Advocacy work ==
Hughes has produced concerts for Atlanta Community Ministries ("One City, Many Voices," performers have included Cece Winans, Take 6, and Eddie from Ohio). She has traveled the world on behalf of music education and outreach, appearing in the slums of Nairobi, Kenya; at The George Washington Academy in Casablanca, Morocco; and at L’Eglise Reformee in Paris, France. She and her husband, Mike Hinton, were "Artists in Residence" at the former Georgia Music Hall of Fame, teaching the greatness of Georgia songwriters Johnny Mercer and Otis Redding. Her passion for music education led to her 2010 appointment as "Grammy Museum Ambassador" for The Atlanta Chapter of The Recording Academy.

The 2016 limited "Native Land Tour" partnered with Usher Raymond's "Usher's New Look" organization, with proceeds from the shows going to support UNL's mission to help youth-at-risk graduate from high school, attend college, and achieve meaningful careers. In the 2020s, Hughes has performed in benefits for Songs for Kids, Orchard Ministries, and Georgia Center for Child Advocacy.
