= Quarter Moon in a Ten Cent Town =

Studio album by Emmylou Harris
- Released: 1978
- Recorded: 1977
- Studios: The Enactron Truck, Beverly Hills, California
- Genre: Country
- Length: 35:48 (42:43 2004 CD)
- Label: Warner Bros. Nashville
- Producer: Brian Ahern

Emmylou Harris chronology
Luxury Liner (1976)	Quarter Moon in a Ten Cent Town (1978)	Profile: Best of Emmylou Harris (1978)

Singles from Quarter Moon in a Ten Cent Town
- 1. "To Daddy" Released: December 3, 1977; 2. "Two More Bottles of Wine" Released: April 15, 1978

Professional ratings
Review scores
Source	Rating
AllMusic	4/5 stars
The Guardian	4/5 stars
The Rolling Stone Album Guide	3/5 stars

Quarter Moon in a Ten Cent Town is the fifth studio album by American country music artist Emmylou Harris, released in 1978. The album reached No. 3 on the Billboard country charts, with three charting singles: "To Daddy" (written by Dolly Parton) at No. 3, "Two More Bottles of Wine" at No. 1 (the third No. 1 of Harris' career), and "Easy From Now On" (co-written by Carlene Carter, and Susanna Clark and the song from which the album's title comes) at No. 12. Also featured are "One Paper Kid", a duet with Willie Nelson, "Leaving Louisiana in the Broad Daylight", which the Oak Ridge Boys would reach No. 1 with in 1980 and "I Ain't Living Long Like This", which Waylon Jennings would reach No. 1 with in 1980 as well. The painting used for the album cover is by Susanna Clark.

At the 21st Annual Grammy Awards, the album was nominated for Best Female Country Vocal Performance but the award went to Dolly Parton for Here You Come Again.

== Track listing ==
Side one
No.	Title	Writer(s)	Length
1.	"Easy From Now On"	Susanna Clark, Carlene Carter	3:06
2.	"Two More Bottles of Wine"	Delbert McClinton	3:06
3.	"To Daddy"	Dolly Parton	2:46
4.	"My Songbird"	Jesse Winchester	3:08
5.	"Leaving Louisiana in the Broad Daylight"	Rodney Crowell, Donivan Cowart	4:20

Side two
No.	Title	Writer(s)	Length
6.	"Defying Gravity"	Winchester	4:15
7.	"I Ain't Living Long Like This"	Crowell	4:05
8.	"One Paper Kid" (with Willie Nelson)	Walter Martin Cowart	2:57
9.	"Green Rolling Hills" (with Fayssoux Starling)	Utah Phillips	3:39
10.	"Burn That Candle"	Winfield Scott	4:26

2004 CD Reissue Bonus Tracks
No.	Title	Writer(s)	Length
11.	"New Cut Road"	Guy Clark	4:11
12.	"LaCassine Special" (with Barry Tashian)	Iry LeJeune, Eddie Shuler	2:44

== Personnel ==
- Brian Ahern - acoustic guitar, 12-string guitar, gut-String guitar, percussion, baby bottle
- Dianne Brooks - backing vocals
- James Burton - electric guitar
- Rodney Crowell - acoustic guitar, electric guitar
- Rick Danko - fiddle, backing vocals
- Hank DeVito - pedal steel
- Emory Gordy Jr. - bass
- Glen Hardin - piano, electric piano, string arrangements
- Emmylou Harris - vocals, acoustic guitar
- Garth Hudson - accordion, baritone saxophone
- Nicolette Larson - backing vocals
- Albert Lee - acoustic guitar, electric guitar, piano, mandolin
- Willie Nelson - duet vocals
- Mickey Raphael - harmonica
- Ricky Skaggs - fiddle, viola
- John Ware - drums, percussion

Technical

- Brian Ahern - Producer, Engineer
- Donivan Cowart - Engineer
- Bradley Hartman - Engineer
- Michael Hollyfield - design
- Ed Thrasher - photography

== Release history ==
Release history and formats for Quarter Moon in a Ten Cent Town
Region	Format	Label	Ref.
North America	LP; cassette	Warner Bros. Records	
