= Stones in My Passway =

Single by Robert Johnson
- Released: 1937
- Recorded: Dallas, Texas, June 19, 1937
- Genre: Blues
- Length: 2:27
- Label: Vocalion
- Songwriter: Robert Johnson
- Producer: Don Law

"Stones in My Passway" is a Delta blues song written by American blues musician Robert Johnson. He recorded it in Dallas, Texas, during his second to last session for producer Don Law on June 19, 1937.

Music writer Greil Marcus describes it as a "song of a man who once asked for power over other souls, but who now testifies that he has lost power over his own body, and who might well see that disaster as a fitting symbol of the loss of his soul." The title may refer to bladder stones, the "passway" being the urinary tract; a painful condition.

I got stones in my passway and all my roads seem dark as night (2×)
I have pains in my heart, they have taken my appetite ...
Now you tryin' to take my life and all my lovin' too
You laid a passway for me, now what are you trying to do

Music journalist Charles Shaar Murray considers "Stones in My Passway" as "one of Johnson's towering masterpieces" and notes "He [Johnson] can desire his woman only when she rejects him [and] his potency deserts him when he is with her". However, AllMusic critic Thomas Ward describes the song as "[lacking] the emotional subtlety and precision of language [that] characterises his masterpieces" and therefore not among Johnson's best work. However, he notes "the guitar playing is incandescent and inspired", which makes it an important piece.

In 1937, Vocalion issued the song on a 78 rpm record, backed with "I'm a Steady Rollin' Man" .
