= Carlene Carter (album) =

Studio album by Carlene Carter
- Released: March 14, 1978
- Genre: Country
- Length: 29:37
- Label: Warner
- Producer: Bob Andrews; Brinsley Schwarz

Carlene Carter chronology
Carlene Carter (1978)	Two Sides to Every Woman (1979)

Carlene Carter is the debut album by Carlene Carter, recorded in London with Graham Parker’s backing band, the Rumour.

== Critical reception ==
Professional ratings
Review scores
Source	Rating
AllMusic	3/5 stars
Robert Christgau	C+

K.A. Scott of AllMusic writes "By recording her debut album in England, Carlene Carter served notice that despite coming from a legendary American country music family, she intended to make her own way in the biz and establish her own musical identity."

Robert Christgau says, "This woman has a strong voice, an assertive persona, and good taste in bands (the Rumour) and grandmothers (Maybelle C.)."

== Track listing ==
No.	Title	Writer(s)	Length
1.	"Love Is Gone"	Alex Call	2:37
2.	"Smoke Dreams"	Carlene Carter; Rosey Nix	3:07
3.	"Between You and Me"	Graham Parker	2:48
4.	"I Once Knew Love"	Carlene Carter	3:36
5.	"I've Been There Before"	Tracy Nelson	2:48
6.	"Never Together but Close Sometimes"	Rodney Crowell	2:17
7.	"Mr. Moon"	Alex Call	2:33
8.	"Alabama Morning"	Michael Bacon; Thomas Cain	3:37
9.	"Slow Dance"	Carlene Carter	3:42
10.	"Who Needs Words"	Carlene Carter	2:32
Total length:			29:37

== Personnel ==
- Carlene Carter - vocals, piano, backing vocals
- Andrew Bodnar - bass
- Steve Goulding - drums
- Brinsley Schwarz - electric, acoustic, and slide guitars, percussion, backing vocals
- Bob Andrews - piano, backing vocals, Oberheim synthesizer, percussion, organ, electric piano, bass
- Nick Lowe - bass, backing vocals
- Graham Parker - acoustic guitar, backing vocal
- Terry Williams - drums
- Ray Bearis - tenor saxophone
- Chris Gower - bass trombone
- Dick Hanson - flugelhorn
- John "Irish" Earle - baritone saxophone

Production

- Produced by Bob Andrews and Brinsley Schwarz
- Co-produced by Martyn Smith

Track information and credits verified from the album's liner notes.
