= I Fell in Love (album) =

Studio album by Carlene Carter
- Released: August 13, 1990
- Genre: Country
- Length: 37:58
- Label: Reprise
- Producer: Howie Epstein

Carlene Carter chronology
C'est C Bon (1983)	I Fell in Love (1990)	Little Love Letters (1993)

I Fell in Love is the sixth studio album by American country music singer Carlene Carter, released in 1990. This was the highest-ranking Billboard album of her career, at #19 on the US Country charts. Four singles from the album also charted, with the title song "I Fell in Love," and "Come on Back" both reaching #3 as singles. Two lower-charting hits were the #25 "The Sweetest Thing" and the #33 "One Love."

The track "Me and the Wildwood Rose" is a tribute to Carter's half-sister, Rosie Nix Adams. "Easy From Now On", a song that Carter cowrote with Susanna Clark in the 1970s, was originally a number 12 hit for Emmylou Harris on the Billboard Hot Country Singles & Tracks chart. Also, "You Are the One," written by Leon Payne, was a top 5 country hit for Carter's father, Carl Smith, in 1956. The album was produced by Howie Epstein from the Heartbreakers and also featured Benmont Tench, who cowrote the title track.

== Critical reception ==
Professional ratings
Review scores
Source	Rating
AllMusic	4/5 stars
Q	4/5 stars
The Rolling Stone Album Guide	4/5 stars

AllMusic's review by Mark Deming states "with June Carter Cash and Levon Helm joining her on backing vocals, the country accents ring out with an honesty and purity that cuts through the radio-ready mix. I Fell in Love may have been an effort to play nice on Carter's part, but it doesn't sound like a compromise so much as proof she had enough talent to have her cake and eat it too. And in this case, the cake is pretty tasty stuff."

People's review begins with "Maybe it has just taken this much time for all those country-music genes and step-genes to get lined up, but Carter at 34 is sounding much better than ever." Mark Cooper in Q Magazine called the album "a well-balanced set which plays to all Carter's strengths and the one she's been promising to make all along."

== Track listing ==
No.	Title	Writer(s)	Length
1.	"I Fell in Love"	Carlene Carter; Howie Epstein; Benmont Tench; Perry Lamek	3:40
2.	"Come On Back"	C. Carter	2:56
3.	"The Sweetest Thing"	C. Carter; Robert Ellis Orrall	4:13
4.	"My Dixie Darlin'"	A. P. Carter	2:36
5.	"Goodnight Dallas"	C. Carter	3:39
6.	"One Love"	C. Carter; Howie Epstein; Perry Lamek	3:03
7.	"The Leavin' Side"	C. Carter; Keith Christopher; Tom Gray	3:25
8.	"Guardian Angel"	C. Carter; James Eller	3:24
9.	"Me and the Wildwood Rose"	C. Carter	3:54
10.	"You Are the One"	Leon Payne	2:37
11.	"Easy From Now On"	C. Carter; Susanna Clark	4:31
Total length:			37:58

- Track information and credits taken from the album's liner notes.

== Charts ==
=== Weekly charts ===
Chart (1990)	Peak position
US Top Country Albums (Billboard)	19

=== Year-end charts ===
Chart (1991)	Position
US Top Country Albums (Billboard)	48
