= Blue Nun (album) =

Studio album by Carlene Carter
- Released: 1981
- Studio: Eden, Ampro
- Genre: Country
- Length: Original: 33:41; Reissue: 38:28
- Label: Warner Bros. (USA); F-Beat (UK)
- Producer: Nick Lowe, Roger Bechirian

Carlene Carter chronology
Musical Shapes (1980)	Blue Nun (1981)	C'est C Bon (1983)

Blue Nun is an album by the American musician Carlene Carter, released in 1981. It features two duets with British rocker Paul Carrack: "Oh How Happy" and "Do Me Lover".

== Critical reception ==
Professional ratings
Review scores
Source	Rating
AllMusic	3/5 stars
Record Mirror	3/5 stars

Writing in The Boston Phoenix, Joyce Millman opined that while Carter "can write a snazzy pop tune ... the absence of any 'Western swing' makes Blue Nun a bit of a disappointment. ... [T]hough [producer Nick] Lowe has assembled the best pop hired hands (guitarists Martin Belmont, Billy Bremner, and ex-Record Huw Gower), Carter frequently sounds like a teenager singing along with her Supremes records."

== Track listing ==
All tracks are written by Carlene Carter, unless otherwise noted.

Side one (Original LP release)
No.	Title	Writer(s)	Length
1.	"Love Is a 4 Letter Verb"		2:39
2.	"That Boy"		3:20
3.	"300 Pounds of Hongry"	Donnie Fritts; Eddie Hinton	2:40
4.	"Tougher Stuff"	Carlene Carter; Nick Lowe	2:40
5.	"I Need a Hit"	Carlene Carter; James Eller	2:44
6.	"Rockababy"		2:20

Side two (Original LP release)
No.	Title	Writer(s)	Length
1.	"Me and My .38"	Carlene Carter; Nick Lowe	2:52
2.	"Do Me Lover" (duet with Paul Carrack)	Carlene Carter; Nick Lowe; James Eller	2:49
3.	"Home Run Hitter"	Carlene Carter; Nick Lowe	2:34
4.	"Billy"	Carlene Carter; Paul Carrack	2:38
5.	"Born to Move"	John Fogerty	2:33
6.	"Think Dirty"		3:52
Total length:			33:41

1981 Reissue
No.	Title	Writer(s)	Length
1.	"Oh How Happy" (duet with Paul Carrack)	Edwin Starr	2:38
2.	"Love Is a 4-Letter Verb"		2:39
3.	"That Boy"		3:20
4.	"300 Pounds of Hongry"	Donnie Fritts; Eddie Hinton	2:40
5.	"Tougher Stuff"	Carlene Carter; Nick Lowe	2:40
6.	"I Need a Hit"	Carlene Carter; James Eller	2:44
7.	"Rockababy"		2:20
8.	"When You Comin' Back?"	Count Freda (Roger Bechirian)	2:26
9.	"Me and My .38"	Carlene Carter; Nick Lowe	2:52
10.	"Do Me Lover" (duet with Paul Carrack)	Carlene Carter; Nick Lowe; James Eller	2:49
11.	"Too Many Teardrops"	Carlene Carter; Nick Lowe	2:17
12.	"Billy"	Carlene Carter; Paul Carrack	2:38
13.	"Born to Move"	John Fogerty	2:33
14.	"Think Dirty"		3:52
Total length:			38:28

- Track information and credits verified from the album's liner notes.

== Personnel ==
- Martin Belmont – guitar
- Billy Bremner – guitar, backing vocals
- Bette Bright – backing vocals
- Paul Carrack – Hammond organ, piano, backing vocals
- Carlene Carter – guitar, piano, vocals
- Ginny Clee – backing vocals
- Big Al Downing – backing vocals
- James Eller – bass, backing vocals
- Huw Gower – guitar, backing vocals
- Bobby Irwin – drums, backing vocals
- Nick Lowe – bass, backing vocals
- Glenn Tilbrook – backing vocals

Technical

- Paul Bass, Aldo Bocca, Rob Keyloch, Neill King – engineer
