= Donna Tracy =

American visual effects artist

Donna Tracy is an American visual effects artist whose work on numerous feature films over more than 25 years includes Star Wars and Spider-Man. She moved from traditional film, animation and visual effects to the digital production process.

"Cloudwoman", shown at the old Los Angeles Jail in 1998, was a collaborative work with Jael Lehmann and Ann Monn that gave voice to Olive Oatman who became Cloudwoman. A digital print series "Virtual Species or Digital Waste" (2005) was developed out of patches salvaged from the digital film making process ("digitritus"). Tracy has published about copyright issues for this work.

Her master's degree in art studies was taken at the California Institute of the Arts in the Art Program. An animated work, Nichelodeon: A Peep Show, was projected in 2006 at the MOMA exhibition, TOMORROWLAND: CalArts in Moving Pictures, of former Cal Arts students work.

In 2001, Tracy resigned from her position at Sony Pictures, to teach at Chaffey College. She has moved from there to start OmniCosm Studios with Adolf Schaller. They completed a commission for the Griffith Observatory in Los Angeles - a series of new planet landscapes, Mercury, Venus, Mars and Pluto - for the Deep Space Exhibit. She is working with Adolf Schaller and Michael Ferriter (Pure Light Images) on the creation of a 3D film series for multi-venue theater productions based on astronomical phenomena. Their first two productions are, Journey to a Black Hole 3D and Star Blast 3D: A Supernova Experience.
