= Little Acts of Treason =

Studio album by Carlene Carter
- Released: 1995
- Genre: Country
- Label: Giant
- Producer: Carlene Carter, James Stroud, Howie Epstein

Carlene Carter chronology
Little Love Letters (1993)	Little Acts of Treason (1995)	Stronger (2008)

Professional ratings
Review scores
Source	Rating
Allmusic	3/5 stars
The Austin Chronicle	2.5/5 stars

Little Acts of Treason is an album released in 1995 by American country music singer Carlene Carter. Included is "Loose Talk," a duet with Carter's father, veteran country musician Carl Smith. The album's lead-off single "Love Like This" was originally recorded by Blackhawk for their 1994 debut album, Blackhawk, and before that by Kennedy Rose on their 1990 album hai ku.

Carter co-produced with James Stroud on tracks 1–4, 8, 10 and 11 and Howie Epstein on track 12; she produced the rest of the album herself.

== Track listing ==
No.	Title	Writer(s)	Length
1.	"Hurricane"	Carter, Al Anderson	3:11
2.	"Love Like This"	Mary Ann Kennedy, Pam Rose, Pat Bunch	3:21
3.	"Little Acts of Treason"	Carter	3:47
4.	"He Will Be Mine"	Carter, Anderson	3:15
5.	"Come Here You"	Carter	4:43
6.	"Change"	Carter	4:37
7.	"The Lucky Ones"	Carter	4:01
8.	"All Night Long"	Carter, Anderson	3:46
9.	"You'll Be the One"	Carter	4:28
10.	"Loose Talk" (featuring Carl Smith)	Freddie Hart, Ann Lucas	2:43
11.	"Go Wild"	Carter, Anderson	3:11
12.	"The Winding Stream"	A.P. Carter	3:20
13.	"Come Here You" (reprise)	Carter	1:08

== Personnel ==
- Carlene Carter - vocals, guitar, autoharp, marxophone, percussion, glockenspiel, bongos, piano, keyboards
- Johnny Cash - background vocals
- Carl Smith - vocals
- Alan Gordon Anderson - lead guitar, electric guitar, acoustic guitar, vocals
- John Jorgenson - lead guitar, electric guitar, acoustic guitar, slide guitar, mandolin, sitar
- Matt Rollings - piano
- Mickey Raphael - harmonica
- Eddie Bayers - drums
- Robert Becker - violin
- Benmont Tench - piano, organ, keyboards, fiddle,
- Michael Black - background vocals
- Kenneth Burward-Hoy - viola
- Larry Byrom - acoustic guitar, slide guitar
- Darius Campo - viola
- Howie Epstein - background vocals
- Sheila "Sheila E." Escovedo - percussion
- Paul Franklin - guitar, steel guitar, pedal steel guitar
- John Hobbs - piano, organ
- Dann Huff - electric guitar
- Danny Jacob - guitar
- Scott Joss - fiddle, harmonica
- Jana King - background vocals
- Jay Dee Maness - pedal steel guitar
- Jim Lauderdale - vocals
- Mark O'Connor - fiddle
- Sid Page - concertmaster
- Phil Parlapiano - accordion, harmonium, keyboards, mandolin
- Mickey Rafael - harmonica
- Rachel Robinson - flageolet, violin
- Vince Santoro - drums, percussion, vocals
- Joe Spivey - mandolin
- Glenn Worf - bass
- Curtis Young - background vocals
- Jim Hanson - bass, vocals
- Barbara Santoro - background vocals
- Bruce Dukov, Lily Ho Chen, David Ewart, Michael Markham - violin
- Tiffany A. Lowe - background vocals
- Not Quite Ready for the Opry Singers - choir, chorus
- Steve Richards - cello

== Chart performance ==
Chart (1995)	Peak position
U.S. Billboard Top Country Albums	65
Canadian RPM Country Albums	18
