= Two More Bottles of Wine =

Single by Emmylou Harris

from the album Quarter Moon in a Ten Cent Town
- B-side: "I Ain't Living Long Like This"
- Released: April 15, 1978
- Genre: Country
- Length: 3:08
- Label: Warner Bros. Nashville
- Songwriter: Delbert McClinton
- Producer: Brian Ahern

Emmylou Harris singles chronology
"To Daddy" (1977)	"Two More Bottles of Wine" (1978)	"Easy From Now On" (1978)

"Two More Bottles of Wine" is a song written and recorded by Delbert McClinton for his 1975 album Victim of Life's Circumstances. In 1978, it was covered by American country music artist Emmylou Harris. It was released in April 1978 as the first single from the album Quarter Moon in a Ten Cent Town. "Two More Bottles of Wine" topped the U.S. country singles chart that June. In 1979, McClinton rerecorded it for "Keeper of the Flame." Terri Clark covered the song for her 2012 album Classic. A live version by Sheryl Crow and Vince Gill appears on the 2016 CD The Life & Songs of Emmylou Harris: An All-Star Concert Celebration.

== Content ==
In the song, the narrator moves with his/her lover to Los Angeles, 1,600 miles away from their home, in search of success, but the lover abruptly leaves. The narrator is then left to fend for him/herself, eventually working in a menial job "sweeping out a warehouse in West L.A." but eventually concludes it is all right because he/she still has "two more bottles of wine".

== Charts ==
Chart (1978)	Peak position
US Hot Country Songs (Billboard)	1
Canadian RPM Country Tracks	1
