= To Daddy =

Single by Emmylou Harris

from the album Quarter Moon in a Ten Cent Town
- B-side: "Tulsa Queen"
- Released: December 3, 1977
- Genre: Country
- Length: 2:46
- Label: Warner Bros. Nashville #8498
- Songwriter: Dolly Parton
- Producer: Brian Ahern

Emmylou Harris singles chronology
"Making Believe" (1977)	"To Daddy" (1977)	"Two More Bottles of Wine" (1978)

"To Daddy"" is a country song, written by Dolly Parton. It was performed by Emmylou Harris in the 1970s, included on her album Quarter Moon in a Ten Cent Town and released as a single. Having reached number three on Billboard's Hot Country chart, Harris's version is the most familiar to most people.

== Content ==
To Daddy is said to describe the pain Parton's mother experienced as she ignored her husband's occasional affairs and his lack of affection. It relates to how her mother, in having the family's best interest at heart and to be the best possible mother she could to her children, that she stood by her husband through difficult times. (Unlike Parton's parents, however, who remained together, the mother in the song ultimately leaves the family.)

In the song, related from the vantage point of a teenage girl, her mother seems to not care that her husband is neglectful and cold, concluding each verse with, "if she did, she never did say so to Daddy". In the final verse, however, the family members wake one morning to find a note in which their mother confesses that she stayed for as long as she had because her children needed her, but now that they are getting older and don't need her as much, she's left to search for the love and affection that she never received from her husband.

== Critical reception ==
In 1979, shortly after Emmylou Harris covered the song, the Teenager described the song as "being like an O. Henry short story". Billboard called it "a fine interpretation".

Harris's rendition of the song appears on her album Quarter Moon in a Ten Cent Town. Released as a single in 1977, it peaked at number 3 on the Billboard country singles charts. It was also a Number One single on the RPM Country Tracks charts in Canada.

Harris' recording of the song was included on the 2003 tribute album Just Because I'm a Woman: Songs of Dolly Parton.

== Other versions ==
Parton's own rendition of the song, recorded in 1976, was intended to appear on her All I Can Do album, but was ultimately not included on the album; the recording later appeared on her 1995 compilation "I Will Always Love You - The Essential Dolly Parton One".

== Chart positions ==
Chart (1977–1978)	Peak position
US Hot Country Songs (Billboard)	3
US Bubbling Under Hot 100 (Billboard)	2
Canadian RPM Country Tracks	1
