= Susanna Clark =

American artist and country/folk songwriter (1939–2012)

Susanna Talley Clark
- Susanna with her husband Guy and their close friend Townes van Zandt

Background information
- Born: Susanna Talley; March 11, 1939; Atlanta, Texas, U.S.
- Died: June 27, 2012 (aged 73) Nashville, Tennessee, U.S.
- Genres: Country, Texas country, outlaw country, folk Americana
- Occupations: songwriter, painter
- Years active: 1970s–2012
- Formerly of: Guy Clark, Townes Van Zandt, Jerry Jeff Walker, Steve Earle, Emmylou Harris, Rodney Crowell, Richard Leigh, Jo Harvey Allen

Susanna Talley Clark (March 11, 1939 – June 27, 2012) was an American artist and country/folk songwriter. She was married to Texas singer-songwriter Guy Clark and had a close personal friendship with fellow singer-songwriter Townes Van Zandt.

== Career ==
Susanna Clark was an accomplished painter. Her paintings graced several musical album covers including her husband's debut album Old No. 1, Emmylou Harris's Quarter Moon in a Ten Cent Town, Willie Nelson's Stardust, and Nanci Griffith's The Dust Bowl Symphony. Susanna Clark wrote the No. 1 hit song "I'll Be Your San Antone Rose," recorded first by RCA recording artist Dottsy in 1975. She co-wrote "Come From the Heart" with Richard Leigh. Don Williams recorded it first and Kathy Mattea took the song to No. 1 in 1989. Lyrics from "Come From the Heart" have been wrongly attributed to Mark Twain. Susanna Clark also co-wrote "Easy From Now On" with Carlene Carter. The song was recorded by Carter, Emmylou Harris, Miranda Lambert and others. She co-wrote "Heavenly Houseboat Blues" with Townes Van Zandt. Jerry Jeff Walker recorded several Susanna Clark songs including "We Were Kinda Crazy Then."

== Personal life ==
Susanna Talley was born in Atlanta, Texas to John and Virginia Talley. She had eight siblings. Susanna was raised in Oklahoma City as a member of the socialite Kirkpatrick family. She married John Wallis in Oklahoma City in 1961. They divorced in 1966. In 1970, after the suicide of her sister Johna "Bunny" Talley (Sept 22, 1944 - May 3, 1970), Susanna fell in love with Bunny's boyfriend, songwriter Guy Clark. Susanna moved to Houston with Guy on July 4, 1970. They soon moved to Los Angeles for one year and in the fall of 1971, Susanna and Guy moved to Nashville, Tennessee when Guy got a song publishing deal with Sunbury Dunbar. In 1972, Susanna and Guy married with Townes Van Zandt as their best man. Guy and Susanna separated in 1989, but reunited in 1995, and stayed together until her death from cancer on June 27, 2012.

== Filmography ==
- Heartworn Highways - Documentary, Snapper/Catfish, 1981/2003, with Guy Clark, Townes Van Zandt, David Allan Coe, and Steve Earle
- Be Here to Love Me - Documentary, Rake Films, 2004
- Without Getting Killed or Caught - Documentary, Slow Uvalde Films, 2020
