= Musical Shapes =

Studio album by Carlene Carter
- Released: 1980
- Genre: Rockabilly; country
- Length: 35:02
- Label: Warner Bros. (USA); F-Beat (UK)
- Producer: Nick Lowe

Carlene Carter chronology
Two Sides to Every Woman (1979)	Musical Shapes (1980)	Blue Nun (1981)

Professional ratings
Review scores
Source	Rating
AllMusic	4.5/5 stars
Smash Hits	7½/10

Musical Shapes is the third album by American singer Carlene Carter.

The only song to make the Billboard country singles chart was "Baby Ride Easy," (written by Richard Dobson) a duet with Dave Edmunds of the British rock band Rockpile. At the time of the album's release, Carter was married to Nick Lowe, Edmunds's bandmate in Rockpile; Lowe was the producer of the album. It peaked at number 88 in Australia.

== Track listing ==
All tracks are written by Carlene Carter, unless otherwise noted.

No.	Title	Writer(s)	Length
1.	"Cry"		2:07
2.	"Madness"		3:01
3.	"Baby Ride Easy" (with Dave Edmunds)	Richard Dobson	3:20
4.	"Bandit of Love"		2:13
5.	"I'm So Cool"		2:36
6.	"Appalachian Eyes"	Carlene Carter; John McFee	3:19
7.	"Ring of Fire"	June Carter; Merle Kilgore	3:06
8.	"Too Bad About Sandy"		2:59
9.	"That Very First Kiss"		3:05
10.	"Foggy Mountain Top"	A.P. Carter	2:40
11.	"To Drunk (Too Remember)"	Anni O'Brien	3:03
12.	"Too Proud"		3:33
Total length:			35:02

== Personnel ==
- Carlene Carter - guitar, piano, vocals
- Dave Edmunds - guitar, vocals
- Billy Bremner - guitar
- John Ciambotti - bass
- Sean Hopper - organs
- Nick Lowe - bass
- John McFee - guitar
- Roger Rettick - steel guitar
- Bob Andrews - Hammond organ
- Kevin Wells - drums
- Terry Williams - drums
- Cover design by Barney Bubbles
