= C'est C Bon =

Studio album by Carlene Carter
- Released: May 1983
- Studio: Rockfield Studios, Ampro Studios
- Genre: Pop
- Label: Epic
- Producer: Roger Bechirian

Carlene Carter chronology
Blue Nun (1981)	C'est C Bon (1983)	I Fell in Love (1990)

Professional ratings
Review scores
Source	Rating
Allmusic	2/5 stars

C'est C Bon is the fifth album by Carlene Carter. It was released in 1983 via Epic Records. The album was also her last pop album before she switched to mainstream country music for I Fell in Love (1990). It was reissued on the Razor & Tie label in 1995.

The album was produced by Roger Bechirian.

== Track listing ==
All tracks composed by Carlene Carter and James Eller; except where indicated

1. "Meant It for a Minute"
2. "Heart to Heart" (Simon Climie)
3. "Third Time Charm" (Carter, Pete Marsh, Andy Howell, Roger Bechirian)
4. "Heart's in Traction"
5. "I'm the Kinda Sugar Daddy Likes"
6. "Breathless" (Otis Blackwell)
7. "Love Like a Glove"
8. "Cool Reaction" (Pete Marsh, Andy Howell)
9. "Don't Give My Heart a Break" (Carter, Nick Lowe, Paul Carrack)
10. "That Boy" (Carter)
11. "One Way Ticket" (Carter)
12. "Patient Love" (Carter)

== Personnel ==
- Carlene Carter - keyboards, vocals
- Roger Bechirian - keyboards, percussion, vocals
- Pete Marsh - guitar, keyboards, vocals
- James Eller - bass, guitar, keyboards
- Andy Howell - bass, guitar, keyboards
- Terry Williams - drums
- Paul Cobbold - cello bass, engineer

The Bat Horns

- Annie Whitehead - trombone
- Gary Barnacle - saxophone
- Luke Turney - trumpet
- Tony Visconti - horn arrangement on "One Way Ticket"
