= I Fell in Love (Carlene Carter song) =

Single by Carlene Carter

from the album I Fell in Love
- B-side: "Guardian Angel"
- Released: May 31, 1990
- Genre: Country
- Length: 3:40
- Label: Reprise
- Songwriters: Carlene Carter; Howie Epstein; Benmont Tench; Perry Lamek
- Producer: Howie Epstein

Carlene Carter singles chronology
"Time's Up" (1990)	"I Fell in Love" (1990)	"Come On Back" (1990)

"I Fell in Love" is a song co-written and recorded by American country music artist Carlene Carter. It was released in May 1990 as the first single and title track from her album I Fell in Love. The song reached number 3 on the Billboard Hot Country Singles & Tracks chart in October 1990. It was written by Carter, Howie Epstein, Benmont Tench, and Perry Lamek.

== Chart performance ==
Chart (1990)	Peak position
Canada Country Singles (RPM)	3
US Hot Country Songs (Billboard)	3

=== Year-end charts ===
Chart (1990)	Position
Canada Country Tracks (RPM)	16
US Country Songs (Billboard)	60
