= Ghost Brothers of Darkland County =

2012 musical by John Mellencamp, Stephen King, and T Bone Burnett

- Soundtrack album cover
- Music: John Mellencamp
- Lyrics: John Mellencamp
- Book: Stephen King
- Premiere: April 11, 2012: Alliance Theatre, Atlanta, Georgia, U.S.
- Productions: 2012 Atlanta; 2013 US regional tour 2014 U.S./Canada regional tour/2024 Omaha

Ghost Brothers of Darkland County is a musical by John Mellencamp, Stephen King, and T Bone Burnett. It debuted at the Alliance Theatre in Atlanta, Georgia, in 2012. A touring production began in late 2013 through the South and Midwest. A soundtrack was released featuring country, folk, and rock musicians.

The story is a Southern Gothic tale of two brothers who hate each other and are forced by their father to spend time in a haunted cabin, where they are visited by the ghosts of dead brothers who also hated each other.

How did the project come together? John Mellencamp was speaking with his talent agent at Creative Artists Agency, Michael Cardonick. The agent hesitantly asked Mellencamp if he was interested in a producer optioning his music rights to develop a stage musical. John and the agent agreed it was a pass. Mellencamp asked his agent, "Did I ever tell you the story about the haunted cabin I bought for my kids to have a place to go over the summer?"

Mellencamp proceeded to tell Cardonick about the story he'd been enamored with since the 1990s. John became fascinated by the haunting backstory of a cabin he purchased in Indiana. At first, John didn't believe what people familiar with the cabin and its history told him. But after experiencing supernatural occurrences in the house, Mellencamp began reading old magazine articles, and saw that what people said was actually true. Cardonick, Co-Head of CAA’s Theatre Department, told his client, “I think the story is great and would be the foundation for a play or musical.”Mellencamp told Cardonick, "That's the story I want to turn into a musical. The problem is, I need someone who gets that genre and tone, someone who writes like Stephen King, you know, gets horror and the supernatural? It has to be someone with familiarity with this. Who's a writer that's like a Stephen King?"

His agent asked, "John, why get someone “like” Stephen King, and not ask Stephen King? See if it sparks his interest?" Mellencamp's response, "I don't know how the hell to get to Stephen King." To Mellencamp’s surprise, Cardonick stated, “John, I represent Stephen King as well. I'll call him and call you back.” Cardonick recognized that they would work well together and called his client, Stephen King. He briefly told King about the conversation he had with Mellencamp, which included the haunted cabin story and John’s interest in Stephen King collaborating with him. King told Cardonick, “Have John give me a call.” The mutual agent called Mellencamp, told him to call King, and relayed King’s phone number. Mellencamp called King, and asked if he could meet with Stephen to pitch him the idea. King invited him to come to his home. The two met, along with King’s wife. King thought it was a great idea, and asked his wife what she thought, because he didn’t know if the two of them would work well together. His wife’s response, “the two of you ought to work together. You’re just alike.” That was all Stephen needed to hear. He told John, he was in, and the two shook hands.

== Production ==
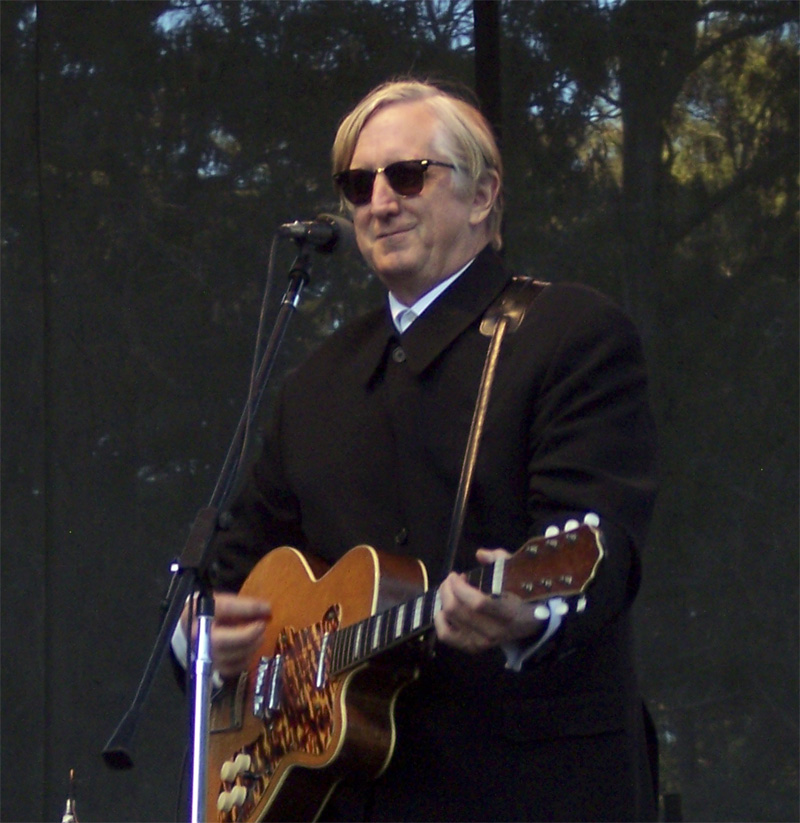
T Bone Burnett produced the music for Ghost Brothers.

In 2002, Mellencamp talked about his vision for the project: "I plan to have every person sing from their generation. This is what I'm thinking right now, but it may not work out this way. When the 18-year-old sings, he'll be rapping at you. When the people in their 70s are singing, they'll be singing in the style of Broadway or the style of Frank Sinatra or country. I intend to cover any type of music that Americans have invented." He did not wind up following this format, as all the songs in the final production are performed in a folk and roots rock style.

Mellencamp provided this update of the musical's progress November 2010:

T Bone and I and Stephen King are working on a musical. All the music has been recorded. We had Kris Kristofferson, Neko Case, Elvis Costello, Taj Mahal, all singing different characters' roles. I wrote all the songs, 17 songs. [T Bone] produced. It sounds like the Sgt. Pepper of Americana to me. Forget about the play, just the songs, the way these people sing them. I'm sitting there listening to it and thinking, "Did Rosanne Cash just kill that song or what!" The play is called "Ghost Brothers of Darkling County," about two brothers who hate each other. If you could imagine Tennessee Williams meets Stephen King.

King and Mellencamp sought a regional theater to stage the show and chose Atlanta. "We wanted a place that was cosmopolitan but not out of touch with country roots. Atlanta seemed like the middle of the bulls-eye", King said. "You know that song, 'If you can make it here, you can make it anywhere?' That's how I feel about Atlanta and this show."

Ghost Brothers began preview shows at the Alliance Theatre in Atlanta on April 4, 2012, opened April 11 and played until May 13, 2012. The musical was directed by Alliance Theatre director Susan V. Booth, with musical supervision by T Bone Burnett. The band included Mellencamp's guitarist and musical director, Andy York, as well as Nashville session bassist David Roe. The copyist (transcribing the musical score) and vocal coach was Peggy Still Johnson.

The cast included Tony Award winner Shuler Hensley and nominee Emily Skinner. Other cast members included Justin Guarini, Jake La Botz, Lucas Kavner, Kate Ferber, Christopher Morgan and Dale Watson. Completing the cast were Peter Albrink, Kylie Brown, Lori Beth Edgeman, Gwen Hughes, Joe Jung, Joe Knezevich, Rob Lawhon, Royce Mann, Travis Smith, Jeremy Aggers, Russell Cook, Stephanie Laubscher, Joseph Signa, and DeWayne Woods. The show featured the blood effects of Joseph Jefferson Award-winning special effects artist Steve Tolin, notable for his international work on the Martin McDonagh play The Lieutenant of Inishmore.

The show went on a 20-city U.S. tour of the Midwest and Southeast in October–November 2013 and an 18-city tour of the Northeast (including Canada), Mid-Atlantic, Upper Midwest, and West regions in late 2014.

== Plot ==
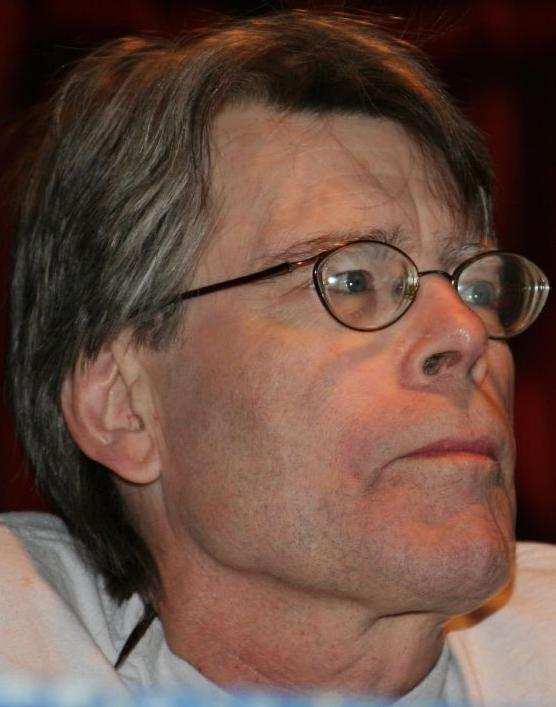
Horror author Stephen King had worked in several media over the course of 40 years but never made a musical until this one.

Describing the plot, Mellencamp said, "I can tell what it's not going to be like: It won't be 'Jack and Diane' meets Cujo. He's [King] already written the story—it's very beautiful, more like The Green Mile. It's an American story about an American family. Some of the characters are 100 years old, some are 15. So that will give me the opportunity to write for each character in a different style. I ain't writing a bunch of rock songs."

In a later interview he said, "[It's about] two brothers; they're 19 years old or 20, maybe 18 or 21, who are very competitive and dislike each other immensely. The father takes them to the family vacation place, a cabin that the boys hadn't been to since they were kids. What has happened is that the father had two older brothers who hated each other and killed each other in that cabin. There's a confederacy of ghosts who also live in this house. The older [dead] brothers are there, and they speak to the audience, and they sing to the audience. That's all I want to say, except through this family vacation, many things are learned about the family, and many interesting songs are sung."

The official production synopsis reads: "In the tiny town of Lake Belle Reve, Mississippi in 1967, a terrible tragedy took the lives of two brothers and a beautiful young girl. During the next forty years, the events of that night became the stuff of local legend. But legend is often just another word for lie. Joe McCandless knows what really happened; he saw it all. The question is whether or not he can bring himself to tell the truth in time to save his own troubled sons, and whether the ghosts left behind by an act of violence will help him—or tear the McCandless family apart forever."

== Reception ==
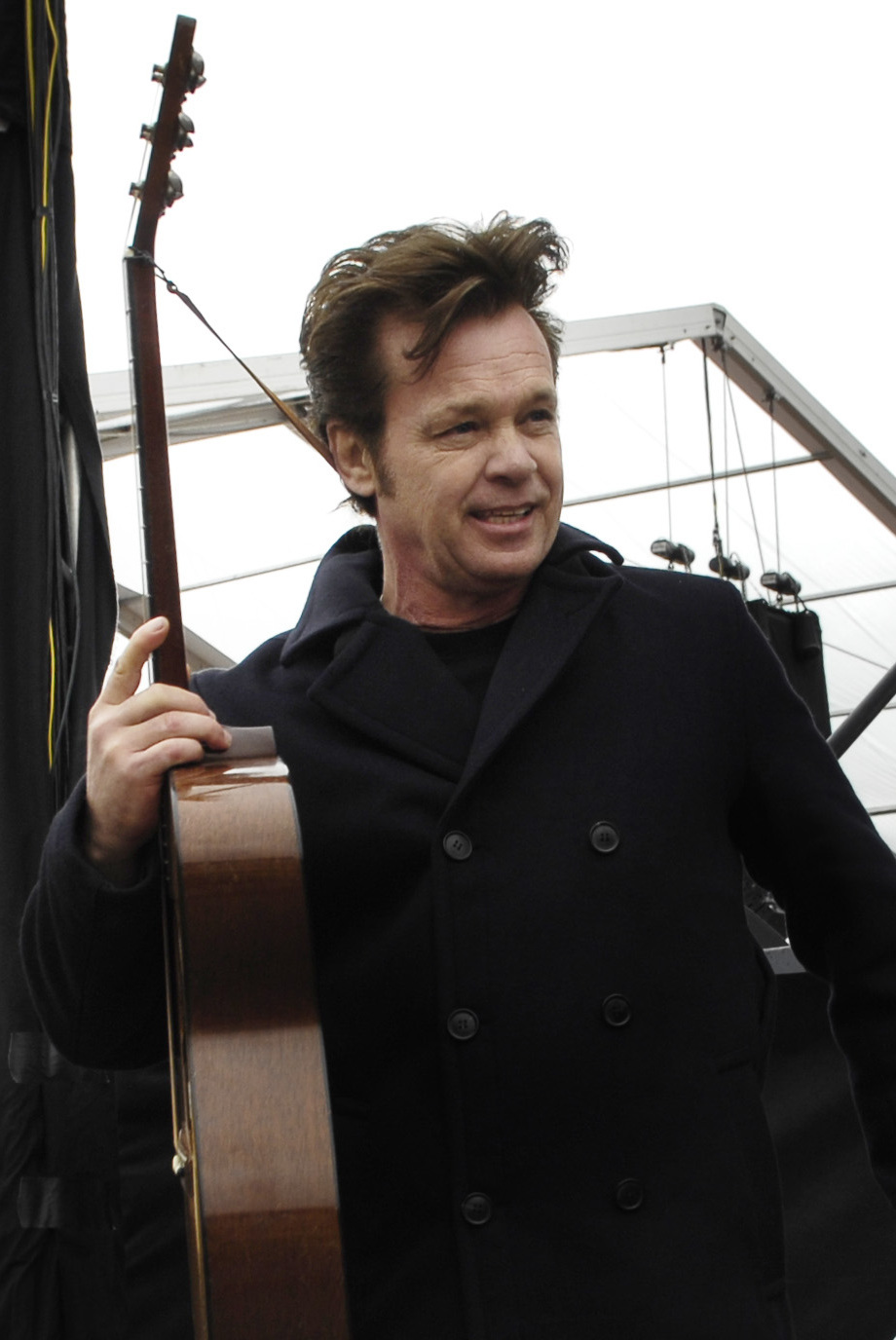
Reviewers emphasized the strength of Mellencamp's songwriting.

A writer for Esquire magazine visited a New York rehearsal of the show in the fall of 2007 and said, "Musicals aren't usually a guy thing. This one, though, is not only tolerable, it's good. It may be the first-ever musical written by men for men. There's no orchestra, just a band with two twangy acoustic guitars, bass guitar, drums, an accordion, and a fiddle. The songs are both haunting and all-American."

The Atlanta Journal-Constitution noted in 2013 that "reviews were mixed" of the original production but "the problems that required tweaking all resided in Stephen King's book—particularly an overlong, muddled second act—never in the music of John Mellencamp."

The newspaper called the musical "a pretty awesome spectacle", praising Mellencamp's "rousing score, a fusion of blues, country and rock that's superbly performed by [director Susan] Booth's 19-member cast. Under Burnett's musical direction, the sensational four-piece band never misses a beat." Of the plot, the reviewer commented: "As a prolific novelist, King is a legendary master of suspense. As a first-time playwright, he doesn't really break new ground so much as he sticks to what he does best. Indeed, 'Ghost Brothers' might impress as a freaky paranormal morality tale on the surface, but at its core it spins a story as ancient as Cain and Abel—or, for one dysfunctional family living in backwoods Mississippi circa 2007, as recent as a mysterious tragedy from 40 years earlier."

The New York Times review said "[t]he production is as rambling as the script", asking "with its parade of Southern Gothic references (Faulkner, Williams, O'Connor) and melodramatic metaphors, is the show supposed to be a winking, mischievous musical? It's not clear." Of the plot, it said "[t]he intricate story of Ghost Brothers might work wonderfully on the page ... but the mood too often wavers. The ghosts fade into the background, sometimes on purpose, other times not." The review praised musical director Burnett, who "handles a diverse range of styles without ever sounding a slick note" with "an impressive chorus of voices to support Mr. Mellencamp's score of blues, gospel and roots." It noted that, overall, "the show does resist cliche."

== Soundtrack ==
Ghost Brothers of Darkland County

Soundtrack album by Various
- Released: June 4, 2013
- Genres: Rock, country
- Length: 70:06
- Label: Hear Music
- Producer: T-Bone Burnett

A CD/DVD was released on June 4, 2013, containing handwritten lyrics and a documentary about the making of the musical. The soundtrack features Neko Case, Rosanne Cash, Elvis Costello, Sheryl Crow, Kris Kristofferson, and Taj Mahal.

John Mellencamp compared the CD version of the musical to "an old radio show with music."

=== Track listing ===
All tracks are written by John Mellencamp except where noted.

No.	Title	Performer	Length
1.	"That's Me" (Mellencamp, Costello)	Elvis Costello	3:14
2.	"That's Who I Am"	Neko Case	3:25
3.	"So Goddam Smart"	Sheryl Crow, Dave Alvin, Phil Alvin	2:44
4.	"Wrong, Wrong, Wrong About Me" (Mellencamp, Costello, Andy York)	Costello	3:21
5.	"Brotherly Love"	Ryan Bingham, Will Dailey	2:30
6.	"How Many Days"	Kris Kristofferson	3:20
7.	"Home Again"	Crow, Alvin, Alvin, Taj Mahal	3:37
8.	"You Are Blind"	Bingham	3:14
9.	"Tear This Cabin Down"	Mahal	5:27
10.	"My Name Is Joe"	Clyde Mulroney	2:13
11.	"Away from This World"	Crow	3:18
12.	"You Don't Know Me"	Rosanne Cash	3:18
13.	"And Your Days Are Gone"	Crow, Alvin, Alvin	4:25
14.	"Jukin'"	Crow	2:17
15.	"So Goddam Good" (Mellencamp, T Bone Burnett, Stephen King)	Crow, Alvin, Alvin	3:04
16.	"What Kind of Man Am I?"	Kristofferson	4:10
17.	"Truth"	Mellencamp, Lily & Madeleine Jurkiewicz	3:20
