= Carlene Carter =

American country singer (born 1955)

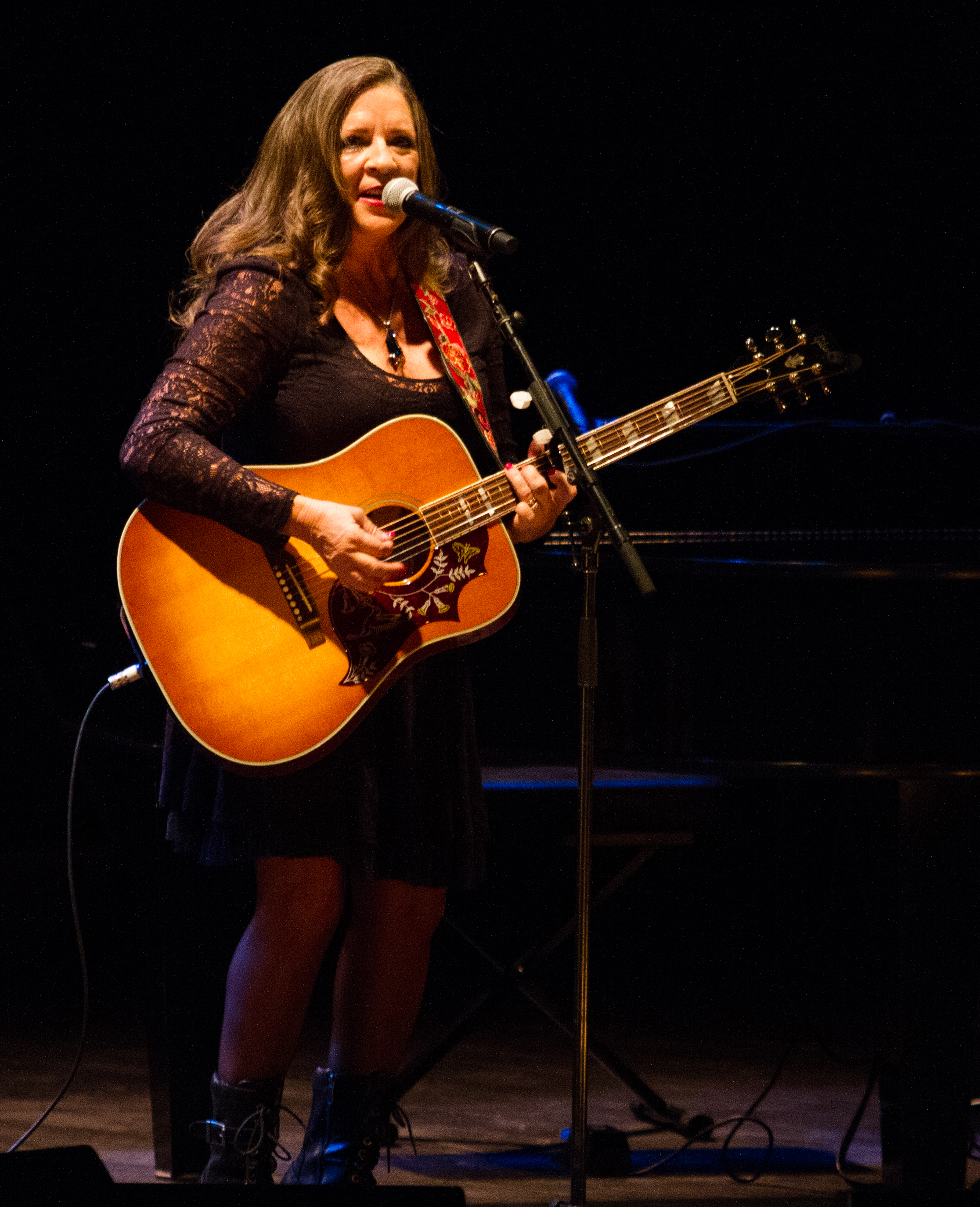
- Carter performing live inside the Stephens Auditorium in Ames, Iowa, in 2016

Background information
- Born: Rebecca Carlene Smith; September 26, 1955 (age 71); Gallatin, Tennessee, U.S.
- Origin: Nashville, Tennessee, U.S.
- Genres: Country, Americana
- Occupation: Singer-songwriter
- Instruments: Vocals, guitar
- Years active: 1978–present
- Labels: Reprise, Giant, House of Cash

Carlene Carter (born Rebecca Carlene Smith; September 26, 1955) is an American country music singer and songwriter. She is the daughter of June Carter Cash and her first husband, Carl Smith.

Since 1978, Carter has recorded 12 albums as of 2020, primarily on major labels. In the same timespan, she has released more than 20 singles, including three number three-peaking hits on the Billboard Hot Country Songs charts.

== Career ==
Carlene Carter's earliest released solo recording was "Friendly Gates", a track included on her stepfather Johnny Cash's 1974 album The Junkie and the Juicehead Minus Me, and credited under the name Carlene Routh.

Her solo recording career began in the late 1970s with her eponymous debut album. In 1979, during a concert at New York City's The Bottom Line, she introduced a song about mate-swapping called "Swap-Meat Rag", from her album Two Sides to Every Woman, by stating, "Well, if that don't put the 'cunt' back in country, I don't know what does." Johnny Cash and June Carter were in the audience, unbeknownst to Carlene.

Carter co-wrote a song with Guy Clark's wife, Susanna Clark, for Emmylou Harris on her 1978 Quarter Moon in a Ten Cent Town album, "Easy From Now On". Carter has stated that the song launched her career as a songwriter and opened doors for her as a performer.

In 1983, she had a top-40 hit "I Couldn't Say No", a duet with Robert Ellis Orrall.

In 1987, Carter joined with the singing trio The Carter Sisters, consisting of her mother June Carter Cash and June's sisters Helen and Anita Carter. Together, they formed a revived version of the Carter Family, and were featured on a 1987 television episode of Austin City Limits along with Johnny Cash.

Carter revived her solo career with the album I Fell in Love, in 1990. The album and title song topped the US country albums and singles charts, respectively. Following a lengthy stint living in the UK and in the run-up to her divorce from English singer-songwriter Nick Lowe, Carter had returned to the U.S., where in 1988 she met musician Howie Epstein, bassist in Tom Petty and the Heartbreakers. Epstein helped Carter get her career back on track, producing I Fell in Love and co-authoring its title track with longtime collaborator, Milwaukee writer Perry M. Lamek. In 1991, the song "I Fell in Love" earned a Grammy Award nomination for Best Female Country Vocal Performance. The album, which featured straight-ahead, retro-sounding country (unlike her prior work, which had combined country, rock and roll and pop sounds) was among the first successes of the 1990s "neotraditionalist" movement in country.

Three years later, Epstein produced Carter's follow-up CD Little Love Letters, featuring the hit "Every Little Thing", which was one of the top-rated music videos of the year.

Carter provided the voice of Red in the 1994 Williams pinball machine, Red & Ted's Road Show, designed by Pat Lawlor. Clips from her song "Every Little Thing" are featured during the game, and a picture of her appears on the backglass.

Carter had a cameo appearance in the 1994 film Maverick. She played a waitress on the gambling casino ship run by Commodore Duvall (James Coburn).

In 1995, Carter's Little Acts of Treason was well received critically, but failed to achieve the commercial success of Carter's two previous releases. In 1996, Carter released Hindsight 20/20, a greatest-hits album, but it failed to achieve success.

She received a small amount of acclaim with the song "It Takes One to Know Me", which was released on the albums Johnny Cash: The Legend and Johnny Cash and June Carter Cash: Duets. Originally recorded in 1977 with a full string backing group, it was lost in a tape collection in Hendersonville, Tennessee, and then recovered in 2003. It then was remastered by her half-brother John Carter Cash. In the remastered version, John added his wife Laura (Carlene's sister-in-law) and his backing vocals and a guest appearance from Carlene herself—more than 25 years after she wrote and first recorded the song.

In 2005, she was played by Victoria Hester in the movie Walk the Line.

On November 20, 2008, Carlene Carter performed at Iron Horse Music Hall in Northampton, Massachusetts, accompanied by Mike Emerson (Elvin Bishop, Tommy Castro) on piano and Sean Allen on electric guitar and later joined by her husband Joe Breen. Alluding to some of her past problems, she said, "I'm really fortunate to have been making records for 30 years... I've had some gaps where I was doing research."

On August 8, 2009, Carlene Carter played a live acoustic set at Heckscher Park in Huntington, New York. During the performance, she stated that it was the first time in more than 30 years that she performed by herself. During her hour-long set, she played the title track from her latest release "Stronger", and said it was written in memory of her younger sister, Rosie Nix Adams, who had died six years earlier. The track was performed on the piano and brought Carter to tears. Her song "Me and the Wildwood Rose" recalls childhood memories of traveling with Rosie to her mother and grandmother's shows. She ended the set by playing "Will the Circle Be Unbroken?" with the opening act: The Homegrown String Band, a family band from the area. She said it brought back memories of playing with her own family.

In 2014, she released her 10th studio album Carter Girl for Rounder Records. The album features 12 tracks written or co-written by members of the Carter Family: 10 pre-existing songs and two new originals. Carter Girl received universal acclaim and includes collaborations with Elizabeth Cook, Willie Nelson, Vince Gill, Kris Kristofferson, and Carter Family members Lorrie Carter Bennett, Helen Carter, Anita Carter, June Carter Cash, and Johnny Cash.

Carter was the opening act on John Mellencamp's 80-date Plain Spoken tour in 2015. Additionally, Carter collaborated extensively with Mellencamp on his 2017 album Sad Clowns & Hillbillies, providing vocals on five tracks, as well as writing one ("Damascus Road") and co-writing another ("Indigo Sunset").

In October 2024, Carter collaborated with Dion on a patriotic digital single, titled "An American Hero" (along with an accompanying video).

Carter, with her brother John, served as co-executive producer of a 2024 documentary film, "June", showcasing the life, career and impact of her mother. The film was directed by Kristen Vaurio. The film was nominated for Best Music Film at the 2025 Grammy Awards.

== Personal life ==
Carter is the daughter of June Carter Cash and her first husband, Carl Smith. She is the granddaughter of Maybelle Carter of the Carter Family and the half sister of Rosie Nix Adams and half sister of John Carter Cash. In the late 1980s, Carter moved back to Nashville to begin a drug- and alcohol-free life and work on her solo career.

Carlene Carter has been married four times:

- Joseph Simpkins Jr. (1971–1972) (one child)
- Jack Wesley Routh (1974–1977) (one child)
- Nick Lowe (1979–1990) (Carter appears in the music video of Lowe's 1979 single "Cruel to Be Kind" with real footage of their wedding.)
- Joseph Breen (2006–2020)

Carter was for many years linked romantically with the late bass player Howie Epstein, best known for his work with Tom Petty and the Heartbreakers. She lived with Epstein in Tesuque, New Mexico, from 1996 until 2002. On June 26, 2001, a New Mexico police officer pulled over Carter and Epstein. A search of the vehicle found drugs and established the vehicle was stolen. Epstein died in 2003 of a suspected drug overdose.

== Discography (studio albums) ==
- Carlene Carter (1978)
- Two Sides to Every Woman (1979)
- Musical Shapes (1980)
- Blue Nun (1981)
- C'est C Bon (1983)
- I Fell in Love (1990)
- Little Love Letters (1993)
- Little Acts of Treason (1995)
- Stronger (2008)
- Carter Girl (2014)
- Sad Clowns & Hillbillies (with John Mellencamp) (2017)

== Awards and nominations ==
Year	Organization	Award	Nominee/Work	Result
1991	Grammy Awards	Best Female Country Vocal Performance	I Fell in Love	Nominated
1991	Academy of Country Music Awards	Top New Female Vocalist	Carlene Carter	Nominated
1991	TNN/Music City News Awards	Star of Tomorrow	Carlene Carter	Nominated
