= List of Procol Harum members =

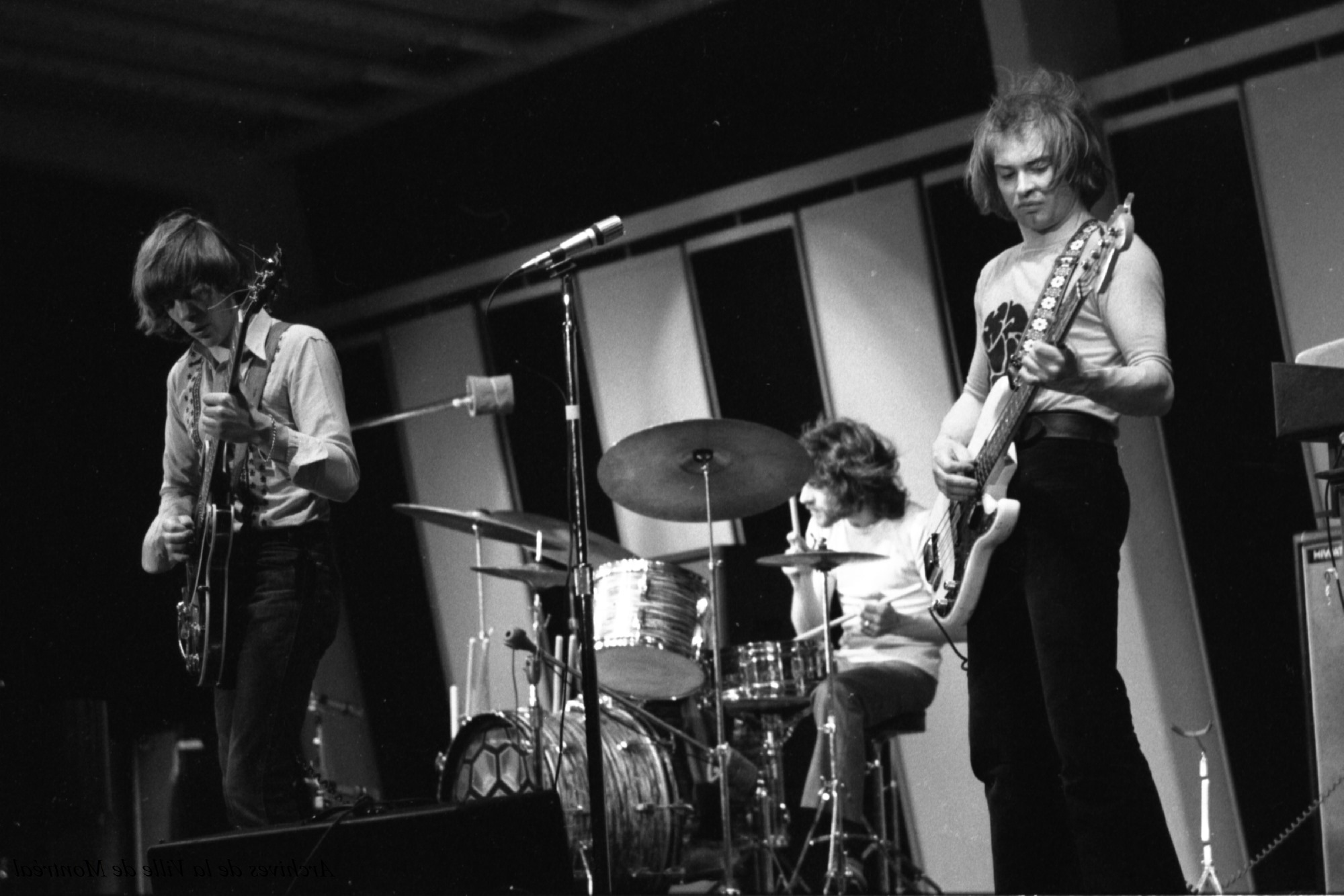
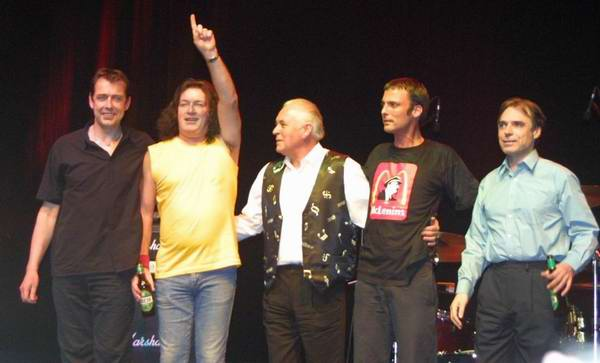
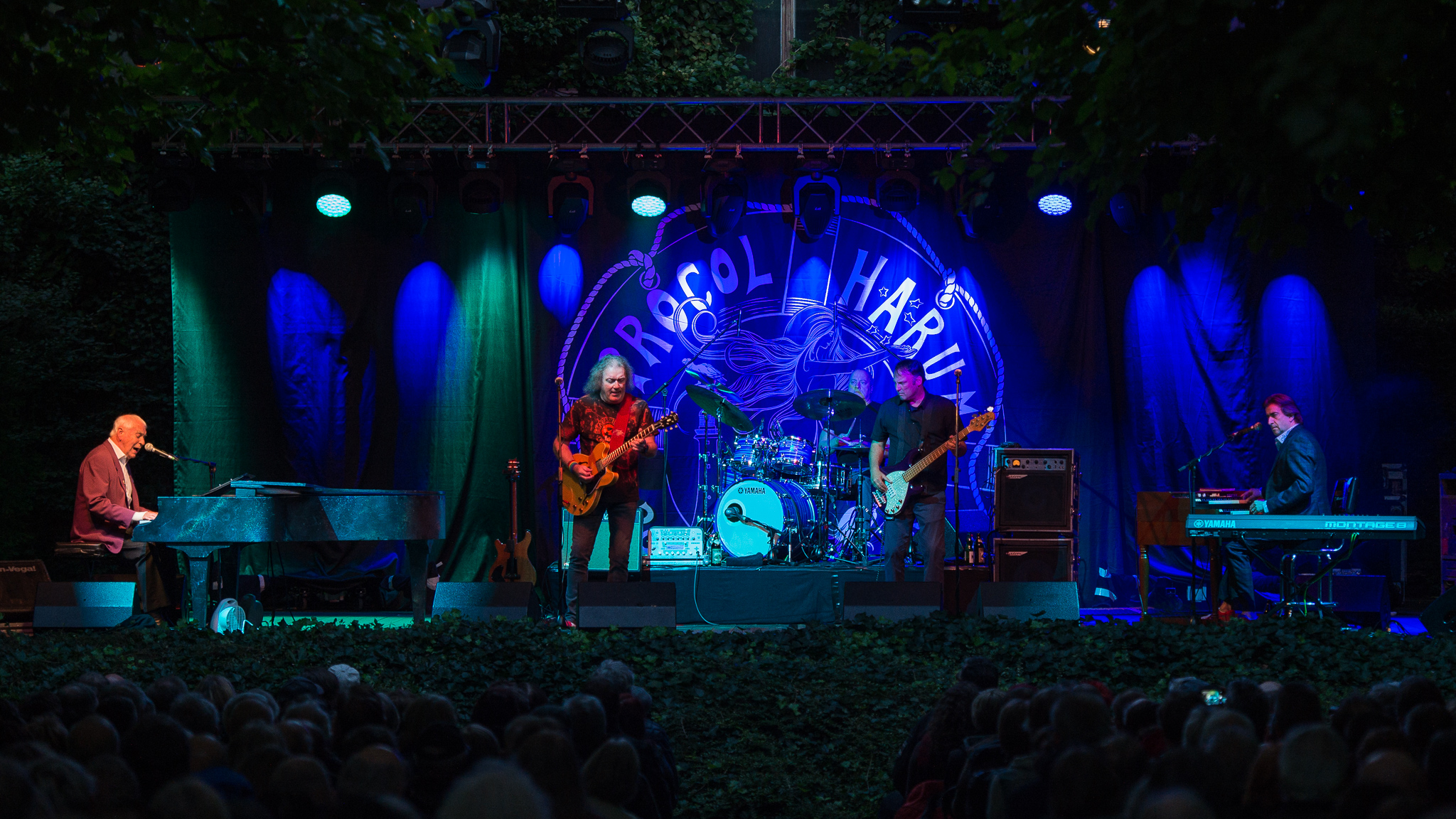
Two lineups of Procol Harum onstage in 1970, 2001 and 2018.

Procol Harum were an English progressive rock band from Southend-on-Sea. Formed in April 1967, the group originally consisted of vocalist and pianist Gary Brooker, guitarist Ray Royer, bassist David Knights, keyboardist Matthew Fisher, drummer Bobby Harrison and lyricist Keith Reid. The band went through a number of lineup changes over the next ten years, before disbanding in 1977. They reformed in 1991 and remained active until Brooker’s death in early 2022. The final lineup of Procol Harum consisted of Brooker, guitarist Geoff Whitehorn (from 1991), bassist Matt Pegg (from 1993), keyboardist Josh Phillips (in 1993, and from 2004) and drummer Geoff Dunn (from 2006).

== History ==
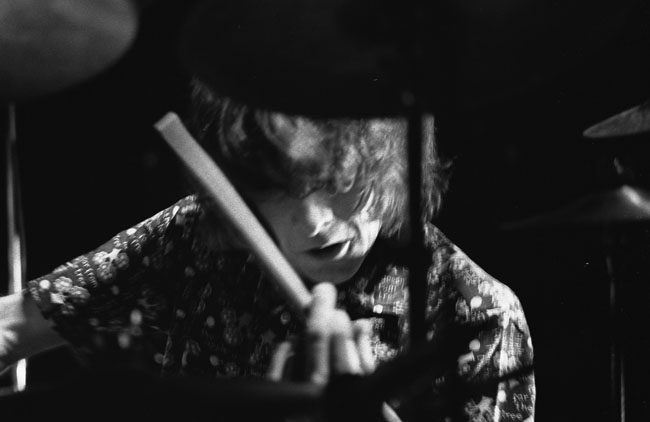
B. J. Wilson was Procol Harum's drummer from 1967 until their first disbandment in 1977.

=== 1967–1977 ===
Procol Harum were formed in April 1967 by former Paramounts pianist and vocalist Gary Brooker and his songwriting partner Keith Reid, who enlisted Ray Royer, David Knights, Matthew Fisher and Bobby Harrison for the group's initial incarnation. For the recording of the band's debut single "A Whiter Shade of Pale", producer Denny Cordell brought in session drummer Bill Eyden in place of Harrison. Shortly after the single was released, Royer and Harrison left Procol Harum to form Freedom, with Brooker's former Paramounts bandmates Robin Trower and Barrie James "B.J." Wilson taking their respective positions. The new lineup released Procol Harum, Shine On Brightly and A Salty Dog, before Fisher and Knights left in late 1969. They were replaced by another former Paramounts member, Chris Copping.

As a four-piece, Procol Harum released Home and Broken Barricades, before Trower left in July 1971 to pursue a solo career. He was replaced by Dave Ball, while Alan Cartwright (a former bandmate of Wilson's in Freddie Mack's band) took over bass from Copping, who remained on organ. This lineup's only release was Live: In Concert with the Edmonton Symphony Orchestra, as Ball left in September 1972 during sessions for their next studio album and was replaced by Mick Grabham. Grand Hotel, Exotic Birds and Fruit and Procol's Ninth followed over the next three years, before Cartwright left in June 1976; Copping subsequently reverted to bass, as Peter Solley joined as the band's new organ player. The new lineup debuted on Something Magic, the band's last studio album for 14 years.

In April 1977, during the promotional tour for Something Magic, Copping joined Frankie Miller's band and was replaced in Procol Harum by Elton John's former bassist Dee Murray. The tour ended in May, and the following month Grabham announced that he had left the band, claiming that he had been "generally dissatisfied with my role ... for some months". The band played one final show in October when "A Whiter Shade of Pale" co-won the Single of the Year award at the 1977 Brit Awards, with Brooker, Wilson and returning members Cartwright and Copping joined by guitarist Tim Renwick.

=== 1991–2006 ===
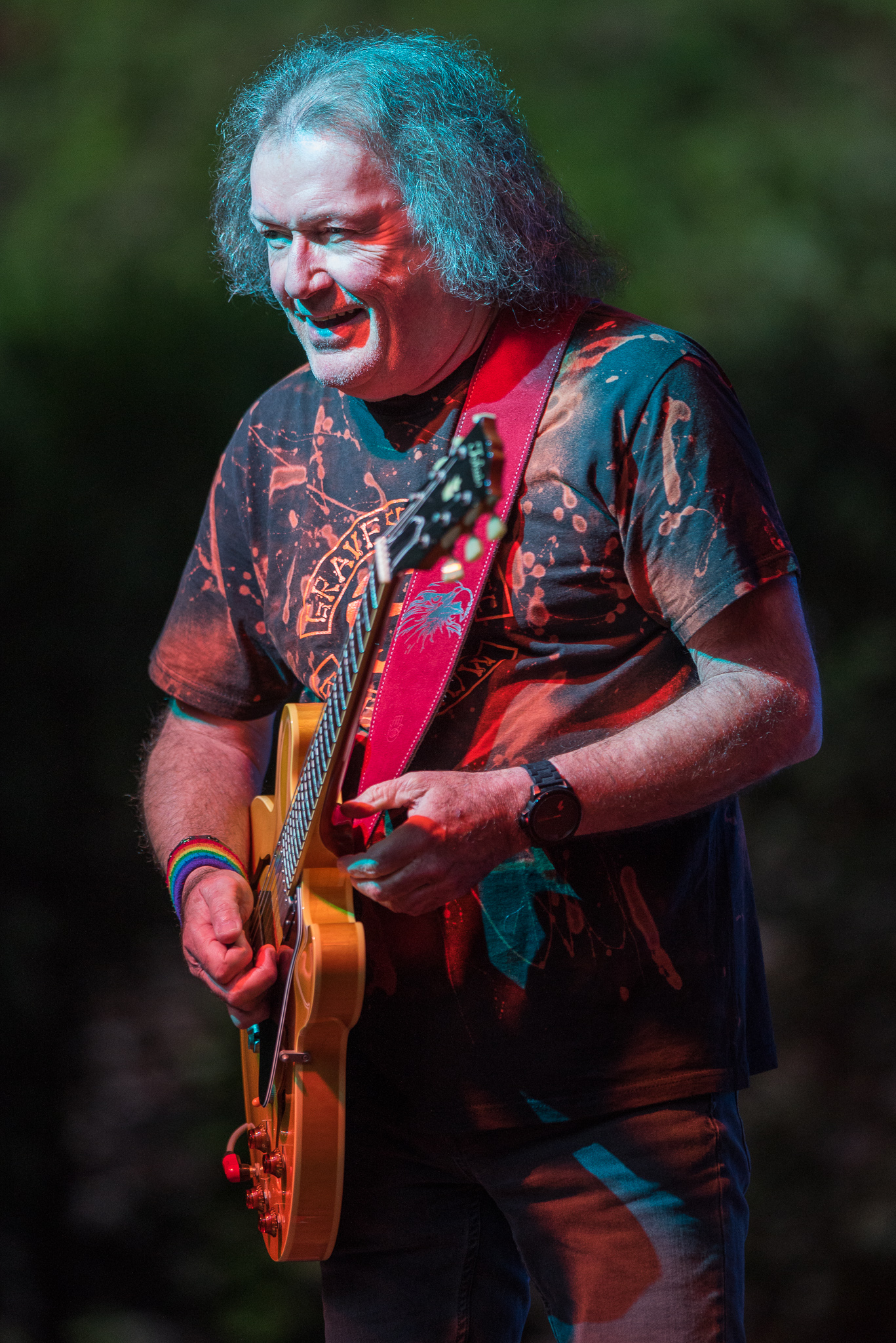
Geoff Whitehorn was the band's guitarist from December 1991.

In 1991, Brooker reformed Procol Harum with guitarist Robin Trower and organist Matthew Fisher, plus new members Dave Bronze on bass and Mark Brzezicki on drums. It was originally planned that B. J. Wilson would return on drums, however he died in 1990 after three years in a persistent vegetative state following a drug overdose. Trower left again after recording The Prodigal Stranger, with Tim Renwick returning for the subsequent tour. Renwick was replaced later in the year by Geoff Whitehorn. After a tour which spawned One More Time: Live in Utrecht 1992, Fisher briefly stepped away from the band to focus on studying for a degree, with Don Snow temporarily taking over for a summer tour. Laurence Cottle substituted for Bronze, who was performing with the Hamsters, at a show in August.

After nearly a year of inactivity, Procol Harum performed a handful of shows in May and June 1993, with former Diamond Head keyboardist Josh Phillips filling in for Fisher and former King Crimson drummer Ian Wallace in place of Brzezicki, who had rejoined Big Country. Fisher returned for shows starting in July, and Matt Pegg replaced Bronze the following month. Touring continued sporadically throughout the rest of the decade – Graham Broad performed drums for a run of shows in July and August 1995, and Henry Spinetti took over for shows in 1996. In 1997, the band played a one-off show in celebration of the 30th anniversary of "A Whiter Shade of Pale", with the regular lineup joined on several songs by former members Mick Grabham, Peter Solley, Alan Cartwright, Dave Bronze and Chris Copping.

Three years passed before Procol Harum performed again, in September 2000 with returning drummer Mark Brzezicki. They returned on a full-time basis the following year, touring regularly and releasing their first studio album in more than ten years, The Well's on Fire, in 2003. Long-time organist Matthew Fisher left the band in June 2004 due to "unresolved matters", with former stand-in Josh Phillips taking his place again. These matters were later revealed to have been a lawsuit filed by Fisher against Brooker and the band for songwriting credits and a share of royalties on "A Whiter Shade of Pale", which he won in December 2006.

=== 2006–2022 ===
In the autumn of 2006, Geoff Dunn replaced Mark Brzezicki on drums. The band's lineup remained constant after Dunn's arrival. However, the group's 2017 studio album Novum was their first not to feature lyrics by Keith Reid (most were written by Pete Brown).

Brooker died on 19 February 2022 with all following concerts being cancelled before and after his death, implying the band had disbanded.

== Members ==
Image	Name	Years active	Instruments	Release contributions
	Gary Brooker	1967–1977; 1991–2022 (until his death)	vocals; piano	all Procol Harum releases
	Keith Reid	1967–1977; 1991–2017 (died 2023)	lyrics	all Procol Harum releases from "A Whiter Shade of Pale" (1967) to MMX (2012)
	Matthew Fisher	1967–1969; 1991–2004 (part time from 1992 to 1996)	organ; backing and occasional lead vocals; rhythm guitar (1967–1969)	all Procol Harum releases from "A Whiter Shade of Pale" (1967) to A Salty Dog (1969), and from One More Time: Live in Utrecht 1992 (1999) to Live at the Union Chapel (2004); The Prodigal Stranger (1991)
	David Knights	1967–1969 (died 2026)	bass	all Procol Harum releases from "A Whiter Shade of Pale" (1967) to A Salty Dog (1969)
	Ray Royer	1967	guitar; backing vocals	"A Whiter Shade of Pale"/"Lime Street Blues" (1967)
	Bobby Harrison	1967 (died 2022)	drums; backing vocals	"Lime Street Blues" (B-side of "A Whiter Shade of Pale" 1967)
	Barrie "B. J." Wilson	1967–1977 (died 1990)	drums; percussion	all Procol Harum releases from Procol Harum (1967) to Something Magic (1977); Live at the BBC (1999); Still There'll Be More: An Anthology 1967–2017 (2018) – all previously unreleased live recordings
	Robin Trower	1967–1971; 1991	guitar; backing and occasional lead vocals	all Procol Harum releases from Procol Harum (1967) to Broken Barricades (1971); The Prodigal Stranger (1991); Still There'll Be More: An Anthology 1967–2017 (2018) – previously unreleased live recordings
	Chris Copping	1969–1977; 1977	organ (1969–1976, 1977); bass (1969–1971 and 1976–1977); rhythm guitar (1969–1971)	all Procol Harum releases from Home (1970) to Something Magic (1977); Live at the BBC (1999); Still There'll Be More: An Anthology 1967–2017 (2018) – previously unreleased live recordings
	Alan Cartwright	1971–1976; 1977 (died 2021)	bass; double bass	all Procol Harum releases from Live: In Concert with the Edmonton Symphony Orchestra (1972) to Procol's Ninth (1975); Live at the BBC (1999); Still There'll Be More: An Anthology 1967–2017 (2018) – previously unreleased live recordings
	Dave Ball	1971–1972 (died 2015)	guitar	Live: In Concert with the Edmonton Symphony Orchestra (1972)
	Mick Grabham	1972–1977	guitar	all Procol Harum releases from Grand Hotel (1973) to Something Magic (1977); Live at the BBC (1999); Still There'll Be More: An Anthology 1967–2017 (2018) – previously unreleased live recordings
	Peter Solley	1976–1977 (died 2023)	organ; synthesisers	Something Magic (1977)
	Tim Renwick	1977; 1991	guitar	none – live performances only
	Dee Murray	1977 (died 1992)	bass	none – live performances only
	Dave Bronze	1991–1993	bass	The Prodigal Stranger (1991); One More Time: Live in Utrecht 1992 (1999)
	Mark Brzezicki	1991–1992; 2000–2006	drums; percussion	The Prodigal Stranger (1991); all Procol Harum releases from One More Time: Live in Utrecht 1992 (1999) to Live at the Union Chapel (2004); In Concert with the Danish National Concert Orchestra and Choir (2009)
	Geoff Whitehorn	1991–2022 (died 2026)	guitar; backing vocals	all Procol Harum releases from One More Time: Live in Utrecht 1992 (1999) to Novum (2017)
	Josh Phillips	1993 (touring); 2004–2022	organ; synthesisers	all Procol Harum releases from One Eye to the Future: Live in Italy 2007 (2008) to Novum (2017)
	Matt Pegg	1993–2022	bass; backing vocals	all Procol Harum releases from Live (2002) onwards
	Ian Wallace	1993 (died 2007)	drums	none – live performances only
	Graham Broad	1995; 1997	drums	none – live performances only
	Henry Spinetti	1996	drums	none – live performances only
	Geoff Dunn	2006–2022	drums	One Eye to the Future: Live in Italy 2007 (2008); all Procol Harum releases from The Spirit of Nøkken (2010) to Novum (2017)

=== Additional musicians ===
Image	Name	Years active	Instruments	Details
	Don Snow	1992 (touring)	organ	Snow temporarily substituted for Matthew Fisher, who was studying, for tour dates in May and June 1992.
	Laurence Cottle	1992 (touring)	bass	Cottle filled in for Dave Bronze for shows in August 1992, as Bronze had prior commitments with the Hamsters.
	Dave Colquhoun	2014 (one live show); 2015 (two live shows)	guitar; backing vocals	Colquhoun stood in at short notice for the hospitalised Geoff Whitehorn for the live show and BBC recording at the Dominion Theatre, London, 24 November 2014. He also played in two shows in Finland in December 2015.
	Pete Brown	2016 (session) (died 2023)	lyrics	Brown, best known for his work with Cream, contributed lyrics to the bands last album Novum (2017) in 2016.

== Lineups ==
Period	Members	Releases
April – July 1967	Gary Brooker – lead vocals, piano; Ray Royer – guitar, backing vocals; David Knights – bass; Matthew Fisher – organ, guitar, backing vocals; Bobby Harrison – drums, backing vocals; Keith Reid – lyrics	"A Whiter Shade of Pale" (1967) (features Bill Eyden in place of Harrison, though Harrison played on the B-side "Lime Street Blues")
July 1967 – September 1969	Gary Brooker – lead vocals, piano; Robin Trower – guitar, backing vocals; David Knights – bass; Matthew Fisher – organ, guitar, backing vocals; B. J. Wilson – drums, percussion; Keith Reid – lyrics	Procol Harum (1967); "Homburg" (1967); Shine On Brightly (1968); A Salty Dog (1969)
September 1969 – July 1971	Gary Brooker – lead vocals, piano; Robin Trower – guitar, backing vocals; Chris Copping – bass, organ, live guitar; B. J. Wilson – drums, percussion; Keith Reid – lyrics	Home (1970); Broken Barricades (1971)
July 1971 – September 1972	Gary Brooker – vocals, piano; Dave Ball – guitar; Alan Cartwright – bass; Chris Copping – organ; B. J. Wilson – drums, percussion; Keith Reid – lyrics	Live: In Concert with the Edmonton Symphony Orchestra (1972)
September 1972 – June 1976	Gary Brooker – vocals, piano; Mick Grabham – guitar; Alan Cartwright – bass; Chris Copping – organ; B. J. Wilson – drums, percussion; Keith Reid – lyrics	Grand Hotel (1973); Exotic Birds and Fruit (1974); Procol's Ninth (1975); Live at the BBC (1999)
June 1976 – April 1977	Gary Brooker – vocals, piano; Mick Grabham – guitar; Chris Copping – bass; Peter Solley – organ, synthesisers; B. J. Wilson – drums, percussion; Keith Reid – lyrics	Something Magic (1977)
April – May 1977	Gary Brooker – vocals, piano; Mick Grabham – guitar; Dee Murray – bass; Peter Solley – organ, synthesisers; B. J. Wilson – drums, percussion; Keith Reid – lyrics	none – live performances only
October 1977	Gary Brooker – vocals, piano; Tim Renwick – guitar; Alan Cartwright – bass; Chris Copping – organ; B. J. Wilson – drums, percussion; Keith Reid – lyrics	none – live performances only
Band inactive October 1977 – early 1991
Early – mid-1991	Gary Brooker – lead vocals, piano; Robin Trower – guitar; Dave Bronze – bass; Matthew Fisher – organ; Mark Brzezicki – drums, percussion; Keith Reid – lyrics	The Prodigal Stranger (1991)
August – October 1991	Gary Brooker – lead vocals, piano; Tim Renwick – guitar; Dave Bronze – bass; Matthew Fisher – organ; Mark Brzezicki – drums, percussion; Keith Reid – lyrics	none – live performances only
December 1991 – April 1992	Gary Brooker – lead vocals, piano; Geoff Whitehorn – guitar, backing vocals; Dave Bronze – bass; Matthew Fisher – organ; Mark Brzezicki – drums, percussion; Keith Reid – lyrics	One More Time: Live in Utrecht 1992 (1999)
May – June 1992	Gary Brooker – lead vocals, piano; Geoff Whitehorn – guitar, backing vocals; Dave Bronze – bass; Don Snow – organ (substitute); Mark Brzezicki – drums, percussion; Keith Reid – lyrics	none – live performances only
August 1992	Gary Brooker – lead vocals, piano; Geoff Whitehorn – guitar, backing vocals; Laurence Cottle – bass (substitute); Matthew Fisher – organ; Mark Brzezicki – drums, percussion; Keith Reid – lyrics	none – live performances only
Band inactive August 1992 – May 1993
May – June 1993	Gary Brooker – lead vocals, piano; Geoff Whitehorn – guitar, backing vocals; Dave Bronze – bass; Josh Phillips – organ (substitute); Ian Wallace – drums; Keith Reid – lyrics	none – live performances only
July – August 1993	Gary Brooker – lead vocals, piano; Geoff Whitehorn – guitar, backing vocals; Dave Bronze – bass; Matthew Fisher – organ; Ian Wallace – drums; Keith Reid – lyrics	none – live performances only
August – September 1993	Gary Brooker – lead vocals, piano; Geoff Whitehorn – guitar, backing vocals; Matt Pegg – bass, backing vocals; Matthew Fisher – organ; Ian Wallace – drums; Keith Reid – lyrics	none – live performances only
Band inactive September 1993 – July 1995
July – August 1995	Gary Brooker – lead vocals, piano; Geoff Whitehorn – guitar, backing vocals; Matt Pegg – bass, backing vocals; Matthew Fisher – organ; Graham Broad – drums; Keith Reid – lyrics	none – live performances only
Band inactive August 1995 – February 1996
February – April 1996	Gary Brooker – lead vocals, piano; Geoff Whitehorn – guitar, backing vocals; Matt Pegg – bass, backing vocals; Matthew Fisher – organ; Henry Spinetti – drums; Keith Reid – lyrics	none – live performances only
Band inactive April 1996 – July 1997
July 1997	Gary Brooker – lead vocals, piano; Geoff Whitehorn – guitar, backing vocals; Matt Pegg – bass, backing vocals; Matthew Fisher – organ; Graham Broad – drums; Keith Reid – lyrics	none – one live performance only (also featured various former members)
Band inactive July 1997 – September 2000
September 2000	Gary Brooker – lead vocals, piano; Geoff Whitehorn – guitar, backing vocals; Matt Pegg – bass, backing vocals; Matthew Fisher – organ; Mark Brzezicki – drums, percussion; Keith Reid – lyrics	none – one live performance only (also featured guest performer Mick Grabham)
Band inactive September 2000 – May 2001
May 2001 – June 2004	Gary Brooker – lead vocals, piano; Geoff Whitehorn – guitar, backing vocals; Matt Pegg – bass, backing vocals; Matthew Fisher – organ; Mark Brzezicki – drums, percussion; Keith Reid – lyrics	Live (2002); The Well's on Fire (2003); Live at the Union Chapel (2004)
June 2004 – September 2006	Gary Brooker – lead vocals, piano; Geoff Whitehorn – guitar, backing vocals; Matt Pegg – bass, backing vocals; Josh Phillips – organ, synthesisers; Mark Brzezicki – drums, percussion; Keith Reid – lyrics	In Concert with the Danish National Concert Orchestra and Choir (2009)
September 2006 – February 2022	Gary Brooker – lead vocals, piano; Geoff Whitehorn – guitar, backing vocals; Matt Pegg – bass, backing vocals; Josh Phillips – organ, synthesisers; Geoff Dunn – drums; Pete Brown – lyrics (session 2017)	One Eye to the Future: Live in Italy 2007 (2008); The Spirit of Nøkken (2010); MMX (2012); ...Some Long Road... (2014); Novum (2017)

== Bibliography ==
- Helander, Brock (2001), The Rockin' 60s: The People Who Made the Music, New York City, New York: Schirmer Trade Books, ISBN 978-0857128119
- Johansen, Claes (2000), Procol Harum: Beyond the Pale, London, England: SAF Publishing, ISBN 978-0946719280
- Scott-Irvine, Henry (20 November 2012), Procol Harum: The Ghosts of a Whiter Shade of Pale, London, England: Omnibus Press, ISBN 978-0857128027
