= Procol Harum discography =

Discography of English rock band Procol Harum

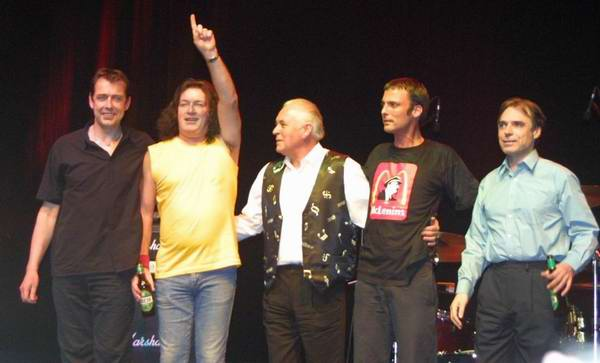
- Procol Harum in 2001
- Studio albums: 12
- Extended plays: 3
- Live albums: 11
- Compilation albums: 23
- Singles: 34
- Video albums: 5
- Music videos: 2

This article presents the discography of English rock band Procol Harum.

== Albums ==
=== Studio albums ===
Title	Album details	Peak chart positions									
Title	Album details	UK	AUS	CAN	DEN	FIN	GER	NL	NOR	SWE	US
Procol Harum	Released: September 1967; Label: Regal Zonophone, Deram; Formats: LP, reel-to-reel	—	—	—	—	—	30	—	20	—	47
Shine On Brightly	Released: September 1968; Label: Regal Zonophone, A&M; Formats: LP, 8-track, reel-to-reel	—	—	26	—	—	—	—	—	—	24
A Salty Dog	Released: April 1969; Label: Regal Zonophone, A&M; Formats: LP, 8-track, reel-to-reel	27	—	25	—	—	—	8	19	—	32
Home	Released: 5 June 1970; Label: Regal Zonophone, A&M; Formats: LP, MC, 8-track	49	24	13	6	—	—	—	—	—	34
Broken Barricades	Released: April 1971; Label: Chrysalis, A&M; Formats: LP, MC, 8-track	42	—	27	5	—	46	—	—	14	32
Grand Hotel	Released: March 1973; Label: Chrysalis; Formats: LP, MC, 8-track, reel-to-reel	—	28	18	4	6	24	9	8	5	21
Exotic Birds and Fruit	Released: April 1974; Label: Chrysalis; Formats: LP, MC, 8-track, reel-to-reel	—	82	—	9	16	38	—	12	9	86
Procol's Ninth	Released: 1 August 1975; Label: Chrysalis; Formats: LP, MC, 8-track	41	—	—	6	2	—	—	11	9	52
Something Magic	Released: 25 February 1977; Label: Chrysalis; Formats: LP, MC	—	—	84	13	20	—	16	19	23	147
The Prodigal Stranger	Released: 27 August 1991; Label: Zoo Entertainment; Formats: CD, MC	—	—	—	—	—	—	—	—	—	—
The Well's on Fire	Released: 4 March 2003; Label: Eagle; Formats: CD, MC	—	—	—	—	—	—	—	—	—	—
Novum	Released: 21 April 2017; Label: Eagle; Formats: CD, 2xLP, digital download	—	—	—	—	—	82	122	—	—	—
"—" denotes releases that did not chart or were not released in that territory.

=== Live albums ===
Title	Album details	Peak chart positions								
Title	Album details	UK	AUS	CAN	DEN	GER	NL	NOR	SWE	US
Procol Harum Live: In Concert with the Edmonton Symphony Orchestra	Released: April 1972; Label: Chrysalis, A&M; Formats: LP, MC, 8-track	48	12	7	5	30	2	23	13	5
BBC Live in Concert	Released: 22 November 1999; Label: Strange Fruit, Fuel 2000; Formats: CD	—	—	—	—	—	—	—	—	—
Pilgrim's Progress	Released: December 1995; Label: MasterTone; Formats: CD+VCD; Germany-only release	—	—	—	—	—	—	—	—	—
Live at the Union Chapel	Released: 30 August 2004; Label: Eagle Vision; Formats: CD+DVD	—	—	—	—	—	—	—	—	—
One More Time – Live in Utrecht 1992	Released: 2005; Label: Gazza, Friday Music; Formats: CD	—	—	—	—	—	—	—	—	—
One Eye to the Future – Live in Italy 2007	Released: 2008; Label: Strongman Productions; Formats: digital download	—	—	—	—	—	—	—	—	—
Procol Harum – In Concert with the Danish National Concert Orchestra and Choir	Released: 17 November 2008; Label: Eagle; Formats: CD, LP, digital download	—	—	—	—	—	—	—	—	—
Spirit of Nøkken	Released: February 2010; Label: Salvo/BMG; Formats: digital download	—	—	—	—	—	—	—	—	—
MMX	Released: July 2012; Label: Salvo/BMG; Formats: digital download	—	—	—	—	—	—	—	—	—
Some Long Road	Released: 5 May 2014; Label: Salvo/BMG; Formats: digital download	—	—	—	—	—	—	—	—	—
Easter Island: New York Broadcasts 1969	Released: 1 November 2019; Label: Unicorn, Parachutes; Formats: CD, LP, digital download	—	—	—	—	—	—	—	—	—
"—" denotes releases that did not chart or were not released in that territory.

=== Compilation albums ===
Title (Note: This is a list of compilations released in the UK and/or US. Numerous other compilations have been released in other territories.)	Album details	Peak chart positions		
Title	Album details	UK	CAN	US
Flyback 4: The Best of Procol Harum	Released: March 1971; Label: Fly; Formats: LP, 8-track	—	—	—
A Whiter Shade of Pale / A Salty Dog	Released: April 1972; Label: Fly; Formats: 2xLP	26	—	—
The Best of Procol Harum	Released: October 1972; Label: A&M; Formats: LP, MC, 8-track; North America and Australasia-only release	—	71	131
Rock Roots	Released: March 1976; Label: Cube; Formats: LP, MC	—	—	—
Greatest Hits Vol. 1	Released: June 1978; Label: Pickwick; Formats: LP, MC, 8-track	—	—	—
Off the Record with Procol Harum	Released: November; Label: Sierra; Formats: 2xLP, MC	—	—	—
The Collection	Released: January 1986; Label: Castle Communications; Formats: CD, 2xLP, 2xMC	—	—	—
Classics Volume 17	Released: October 1987; Label: A&M; Formats: CD; US-only release	—	—	—
Night Riding	Released: July 1988; Label: Knight; Formats: CD, LP, MC	—	—	—
Portfolio	Released: May 1988; Label: Chrysalis; Formats: CD, 2xLP	—	—	—
The Chrysalis Years 1973–1977	Released: April 1989; Label: Chrysalis; Formats: CD, MC; North America-only release	—	—	—
Whiter Shade of Pale	Released: 1990; Label: Castle Communications; Formats: CD, MC	—	—	—
30th Anniversary Anthology	Released: November 1997; Label: Westside; Formats: 3xCD	—	—	—
Classic Tracks & Rarities – An Anthology	Released: 11 February 2002; Label: Metro Doubles; Formats: 2xCD	—	—	—
A & B – The Singles	Released: 20 September 2002; Label: Repertoire; Formats: 3xCD	—	—	—
The First Four	Released: June 2003; Label: Metro Doubles; Formats: 2xCD	—	—	—
The Essential Collection 1967–1991	Released: 11 August 2003; Label: Repertoire; Formats: CD	—	—	—
Secrets of the Hive: The Best of Procol Harum	Released: 27 August 2007; Label: Salvo; Formats: 2xCD	—	—	—
All This and More…	Released: 28 September 2009; Label: Salvo; Formats: 3xCD+DVD	—	—	—
Then & Now – The Best of Procol Harum	Released: 7 February 2011; Label: Salvo; Formats: CD	—	—	—
Insideoutside – The Very Best of Live & in the Studio	Released: 7 April 2014; Label: Metro Select; Formats: 2xCD	—	—	—
Still There'll Be More – An Anthology 1967–2017	Released: 23 March 2018; Label: Esoteric Recordings; Formats: 2xCD, 5xCD+3xDVD	—	—	—
Hits'n'Flips 1967–1970	Released: 3 May 2019; Label: Fly; Formats: digital download	—	—	—
"—" denotes releases that did not chart or were not released in that territory.

== EPs ==
Title	EP details
Homburg	Released: 18 April 2015; Label: Esoteric Recordings/Fly; Formats: 7"
A Whiter Shade of Pale 50th Anniversary EP	Released: 22 April 2017; Label: Fly; Formats: 12"
The One & Only One	Released: 24 November 2017; Label: Eagle; Formats: 10"

== Singles ==
Title (A-side / B-side)	Year	Peak chart positions										A-side UK Album
Title (A-side / B-side)	Year	UK	AUS	BEL (WA)	CAN	GER	IRE	JPN	NL	NZ	US	A-side UK Album
"A Whiter Shade of Pale" b/w "Lime Street Blues"	1967	1	1	1	1	1	1	47	1	1	5	Non-album single (Note: "A Whiter Shade of Pale" was included on the North American release of Procol Harum.)
"Homburg" b/w "Good Captain Clack"	1967	6	5	6	15	15	4	86	1	4	34	Non-album single (Note: "Homburg" was included on the European release of Procol Harum.)
"Conquistador" (Australasia-only release) b/w "She Wandered Through the Garden Fence"	1967	—	31	—	—	—	—	—	—	—	—	Procol Harum
"Quite Rightly So" b/w "In the Wee Small Hours of Sixpence"	1968	50	—	—	—	33	—	—	— (Note: "Quite Rightly So" did not enter the Dutch Single Top 20, but did peak at number 24 on the Dutch Top 40.)	—	—	Shine On Brightly
"Il tuo diamante" (Italy-only release) (Note: "Il tuo diamante" is an Italian-language version of "Shine On Brightly", whilst "Fortuna" is the Italian-language title of the instrumental "Repent Walpurgis".) b/w "Fortuna"	1968	—	—	—	—	—	—	—	—	—	—	Non-album single (Note: Although the English-language version was included on Shine On Brightly, the Italian-language version was included on the Italian release of Procol Harum.)
"Repent Walpurgis" (France-only release) b/w "Conquistador"	1968	—	—	—	—	—	—	—	—	—	—	Procol Harum
"A Salty Dog" b/w "Long Gone Geek"	1969	44	—	—	82 (Note: Chart position in 1972)	—	—	—	3	—	—	A Salty Dog
"Boredom" (US-only release) b/w "The Devil Came from Kansas"	1969	—	—	—	—	—	—	—	—	—	—	A Salty Dog
"Skip Softly (My Moonbeams)" (Japan-only release) b/w "Rambling On"	1970	—	—	—	—	—	—	83	—	—	—	Shine On Brightly
"The Dead Man's Dream" (Netherlands-only release) b/w "About to Die"	1970	—	—	—	—	—	—	—	—	—	—	Home
"Whiskey Train" (North America-only release) b/w "About to Die"	1970	—	—	—	—	—	—	—	—	—	—	Home
"About to Die" (Italy-only release) b/w "Piggy Pig Pig"	1970	—	—	—	—	—	—	—	—	—	—	Home
"Broken Barricades" (North America and Australia-only release) b/w "Power Failure"	1971	—	—	—	—	—	—	—	—	—	—	Broken Barricades
"Simple Sister" (US, Japan, Portugal and Spain-only release) b/w "Song for a Dreamer"	1971	—	—	—	—	—	—	—	—	—	—	Broken Barricades
"A Whiter Shade of Pale" b/w "A Salty Dog"/"Homburg"	1972	13	18	—	—	—	12	—	1	—	—	A Whiter Shade of Pale / A Salty Dog
"Conquistador" (live) b/w "Luskus Delph" (UK); "A Salty Dog" (US)	1972	22	4	33	7	—	—	—	9	3	16	Procol Harum Live
"Robert's Box" b/w "A Rum Tale"	1973	—	—	—	—	—	—	—	—	—	—	Grand Hotel
"Bringing Home the Bacon" (North America-only release) b/w "Toujours L'Amour"	1973	—	—	—	—	—	—	—	—	—	—	Grand Hotel
"Grand Hotel" (North America, Australasia and Continental Europe-only release) b/w "Fires (Which Burnt Brightly)"	1973	—	—	—	—	—	—	—	20	—	117	Grand Hotel
"Souvenir of London" b/w "Toujours L'Amour"	1973	—	—	42	—	—	—	—	—	—	—	Grand Hotel
"Nothing but the Truth" b/w "Drunk Again"	1974	—	—	—	—	—	—	—	—	—	—	Exotic Birds and Fruit
"Beyond the Pale" (Netherlands and Germany-only release) b/w "Fresh Fruit"	1974	—	—	—	—	—	—	—	—	—	—	Exotic Birds and Fruit
"Pandora's Box" b/w "The Piper's Tune"	1975	16	—	—	—	—	—	—	20	—	—	Procol's Ninth
"The Final Thrust" b/w "Taking the Time"	1975	—	—	—	—	—	—	—	—	—	—	Procol's Ninth
"As Strong as Samson (When You're Being Held to Ransom)" b/w "The Unquiet Zone"	1976	—	—	—	—	—	—	—	—	—	—	Exotic Birds and Fruit
"The Adagio di Albinoni" (France-only release) b/w "The Blue Danube"	1976	—	—	—	—	—	—	—	—	—	—	Non-album single
"Wizard Man" b/w "Backgammon" (UK); "Something Magic" (US)	1977	—	—	—	—	—	—	—	—	—	—	Something Magic
"Something Magic" (Netherlands-only release) b/w "Fools Gold"	1977	—	—	—	—	—	—	—	—	—	—	Something Magic
"A Whiter Shade of Pale" (Japan-only reissue) b/w "Homburg"	1988	—	—	—	—	—	—	88	—	—	—	Non-album single
"(You Can't) Turn Back the Page" (Continental Europe-only release) b/w "One More Time"/"Perpetual Motion"	1991	—	—	—	—	—	—	—	—	—	—	The Prodigal Stranger
"All Our Dreams Are Sold" (promo-only release)	1991	—	—	—	95	—	—	—	—	—	— (Note: "All Our Dreams Are Sold" peaked at number 29 on the Billboard Mainstream Rock chart.)	The Prodigal Stranger
"The Truth Won't Fade Away" (US and Germany-only release) b/w "Learn to Fly"	1991	—	—	—	—	—	—	—	—	—	—	The Prodigal Stranger
"Sunday Morning"	2017	—	—	—	—	—	—	—	—	—	—	Novum
"Missing Persons (Alive Forever)" b/w "War Is Not Healthy"/"Missing Persons (Alive Forever)" (Radio Edit)	2021	—	—	—	—	—	—	—	—	—	—	Non-album single
"—" denotes releases that did not chart or were not released in that territory.

== Videography ==
=== Video albums ===
Title	Album details
The Best of Musikladen Live	Released: 27 July 1999; Label: Pioneer Artists; Formats: DVD, VHS; US-only release
Live	Released: 30 July 2002; Label: Classic Pictures Entertainment; Formats: DVD
Special Edition EP	Released: May 2003; Label: Classic Pictures Entertainment; Formats: DVD
Live at the Union Chapel	Released: 30 August 2004; Label: Eagle Vision; Formats: DVD, Blu-ray
Procol Harum – In Concert with the Danish National Concert Orchestra & Choir	Released: 26 May 2009; Label: Eagle Vision; Formats: DVD

=== Music videos ===
Year	Title	Album
1968	"A Whiter Shade of Pale" (2 versions)	non-album
1991	"The Truth Won't Fade Away"	The Prodigal Stranger

== See also ==
- The Long Goodbye (1995 Procol Harum tribute album by various artists)
