= Some Long Road =

2014 live album by Procol Harum

Live album by Procol Harum
- Released: May 5, 2014
- Recorded: 2012–2013
- Label: Union Square Records

Procol Harum chronology
MMX (2012)	Some Long Road (2014)	Novum (2017)

Some Long Road, by Procol Harum, is a live album released on May 5, 2014 by Union Square Records. It was a 10 track album, and consists of performances recorded during Procol Harum's 2012 and 2013 tours of Europe and the United States.

The vast majority of cuts are live versions of songs previously on Procol Harum studio albums; however, following "Homburg," Gary Brooker sings one verse of "Goodnight, Irene," the traditional song made popular by Lead Belly in the 1950s. A second song, "Missing Person," is from Gary Brooker's solo 1985 album, Echoes in the Night. Except for these two songs, all of the lyrics were written by Keith Reid. "Missing Person" was written by Brooker and Ian Sutherland.

== Track listing ==
1. "Wall Street Blues" (Brooker, Reid) 7:12
2. "Pandora's Box" (Brooker, Reid) 5:08
3. "Homburg" (Brooker, Reid) 3:33 / "Goodnight, Irene" 1:04
4. "Simple Sister" (Brooker, Reid) 5:28
5. "Cerdes (Outside The Gates Of)" (Brooker, Reid) 6:51
6. "Missing Person" (Brooker, Sutherland) 4:00
7. "An Old English Dream" (Brooker, Reid) 5:41
8. "A Salty Dog" (Brooker, Reid) 5:00
9. "A Whiter Shade of Pale" (Brooker, Reid, Fisher) (guitar solo) 5:56
10. "Conquistador" (Brooker, Reid) Recorded Live April 2013 5:19
11. "Whisky Train" (Trower, Reid) 5:56

== Personnel ==
Procol Harum

- Gary Brooker – piano and vocals
- Geoff Dunn – drums
- Matt Pegg – backing vocals
- Josh Phillips – synthesiser
- Geoff Whitehorn – backing vocals
- Keith Reid – lyrics (except for "Missing Person")

with:

- Sinfonie Orchester Wuppertal, Director: David Firman – Orchestral Version of "Conquistador"
