= Procol's Ninth =

Studio album by Procol Harum
- Released: 1 August 1975
- Recorded: 1975
- Genre: Progressive rock
- Length: 38:49
- Label: Chrysalis; Repertoire (2000 German reissue)
- Producer: Jerry Leiber, Mike Stoller

Procol Harum chronology
Exotic Birds and Fruit (1974)	Procol's Ninth (1975)	Something Magic (1977)

Professional ratings
Review scores
Source	Rating
AllMusic	3/5 stars

Procol's Ninth is the eighth studio album (ninth including Live) by Procol Harum, and was released in August 1975. Produced by songwriters Jerry Leiber and Mike Stoller, Procol's Ninth featured a slightly different direction from the previous album, with a much starker sound than Chris Thomas's more elaborate productions. According to an interview with guitarist Mick Grabham, conducted by Roland Clare for the 2009 reissue, Leiber and Stoller focused less on the production sound and more on "the structure of the songs". The band appeared on the cover of the album in a straightforward unassuming photograph, mirroring the sound of the album itself. The cover featured simulations of each band member's signature.

Procol's Ninth was the first release from the band to feature non-original songs: a remake of The Beatles' "Eight Days a Week" and Leiber & Stoller's own "I Keep Forgetting". "Eight Days a Week" was put on the album by the producers, initially against the band's wishes. The album also featured "Pandora's Box", a track that had been composed by Gary Brooker and Keith Reid early in the band's career. Cash Box said of "Pandora's Box" that "we guarantee you’ll be humming this Procol heavy night and day by the time Halloween rears its head a few weeks from now." As included on Ninth, it differed substantially from the more psychedelic unfinished version of the song that was ultimately released as a bonus track on the 2009 reissue of the band's first album.

== Track listing ==
All tracks written by Gary Brooker and Keith Reid, except as noted.

=== Side one ===
1. "Pandora's Box" – 3:36
2. "Fool's Gold" – 3:58
3. "Taking the Time" – 3:35
4. "The Unquiet Zone" – 3:34
5. "The Final Thrust" – 4:32

=== Side two ===
6. "I Keep Forgetting" (Jerry Leiber, Mike Stoller) – 3:25
7. "Without a Doubt" – 4:30
8. "The Piper's Tune" – 4:23
9. "Typewriter Torment" – 4:25
10. "Eight Days a Week" (John Lennon, Paul McCartney) – 2:54

=== 2009 reissue bonus tracks ===
Salvo reissued the Procol Harum discography in 2009; the albums were remastered by Nick Robbins, with bonus tracks selected by Gary Brooker and Keith Reid. Procol's Ninth included three bonus tracks that featured little to no overdubs for each track:

1. "The Unquiet Zone" (raw track) – 4:23
2. "Taking The Time" (raw track) – 4:34
3. "Fool's Gold" (raw track with Brooker's guide vocal) – 3:53

== Personnel ==
Procol Harum

- Gary Brooker – vocals, piano
- Mick Grabham – guitar
- Chris Copping – organ
- Alan Cartwright – bass guitar
- B. J. Wilson – drums
- Keith Reid – lyrics

== Charts ==
Chart (1975)	Peak position
Finnish Albums (The Official Finnish Charts)	2
Norwegian Albums (VG-lista)	11
UK Albums (OCC)	41
US Billboard 200	52
