= Exotic Birds and Fruit =

Studio album by Procol Harum
- Released: April 1974
- Recorded: 1973–1974
- Studios: AIR, London
- Genres: Progressive rock, symphonic rock
- Length: 37:00
- Label: Chrysalis
- Producer: Chris Thomas

Procol Harum chronology
Grand Hotel (1973)	Exotic Birds and Fruit (1974)	Procol's Ninth (1975)

Singles from Exotic Birds and Fruit
- 1. "Nothing but the Truth" Released: 1974; 2. "As Strong as Samson" Released: 1974

Professional ratings
Review scores
Source	Rating
AllMusic	3.5/5 stars
Rolling Stone	(not rated)

Exotic Birds and Fruit is the seventh studio album by British progressive rock band Procol Harum. It was released in 1974. The cover artwork for the album is by Jakob Bogdani, a noted Hungarian artist whose paintings centered on exotic birds and fruit.

In Argentina, the album was titled Pájaros Y Frutas Exóticas (literally translated as "Birds and Exotic Fruit").

== Recording ==
Collaborating again with producer Chris Thomas, Procol Harum recorded the album at George Martin's AIR Studios in London. According to singer/songwriter/piano player and bandleader Gary Brooker, the album was recorded in reaction to the two preceding albums which used extensive orchestration. Brooker stated, "We made the live album with an orchestra. We'd then taken the orchestra into the studio for 'Grand Hotel'...we'd had enough of orchestras".

The album features the song "Butterfly Boys", written about the founders of the band's record label at the time, Chrysalis. The band were unhappy with the terms of their contract and expressed that frustration in song.

== Reception ==
Exotic Birds and Fruit met with a good critical reception but only rose to No. 86 on the Billboard album charts. In Denmark, it peaked at #9 upon release, and in early 1975 it re-entered the Top 20 peaking at #19. The album was preceded by the single release of the opening track, "Nothing but the Truth", backed with the single-only B-side track "Drunk Again".

== 2009 Salvo reissue ==
In 2009 Salvo reissued Procol Harum's entire discography on CD remastered by Nick Robbins. The reissue for Exotic Birds and Fruit included two bonus tracks selected by Brooker and Keith Reid. "Drunk Again", the B-side to the single "Nothing but the Truth", appeared on CD along with an alternate mix of "As Strong as Samson".

== Track listing ==
All music by Gary Brooker, all lyrics by Keith Reid.

Side one
No.	Title	Length
1.	"Nothing but the Truth"	3:13
2.	"Beyond the Pale"	3:03
3.	"As Strong as Samson"	5:05
4.	"The Idol"	6:38

Side two
No.	Title	Length
5.	"The Thin End of the Wedge"	3:44
6.	"Monsieur R. Monde"	3:40
7.	"Fresh Fruit"	3:05
8.	"Butterfly Boys"	4:25
9.	"New Lamps for Old"	4:07

Bonus tracks on 2000 and 2009 reissue:
No.	Title	Length
10.	"Drunk Again" (B-side)	4:31
11.	"As Strong as Samson" (single version)	3:46

Bonus tracks on 2004 reissue:
No.	Title	Writer(s)	Length
11.	"The Blue Danube"	Johann Strauss II; arranged by Gary Brooker	9:12

== Personnel ==
Procol Harum

- Gary Brooker – vocals, piano
- Mick Grabham – guitar
- BJ Cole – pedal steel guitar track 3
- Chris Copping – organ
- Alan Cartwright – bass guitar
- B. J. Wilson – drums

== Production ==
- Produced By Chris Thomas
- Engineer: John Punter

== Charts ==
Chart (1974)	Peak position
Australian Albums (Kent Music Report)	82
Finnish Albums (The Official Finnish Charts)	16
German Albums (Offizielle Top 100)	38
Norwegian Albums (VG-lista)	12
US Billboard 200	86

== Release history ==
Region	Date	Label	Format	Catalog
Spain	1974	Chrysalis Records	stereo LP	63 07 531
North America	2004	Friday Music	remastered CD	Friday Music 1021
