= Conquistador (Procol Harum song) =

Song by Procol Harum

from the album Procol Harum
- Released: September 1967
- Recorded: June 1967
- Studio: Olympic, London
- Genre: Psychedelic rock
- Length: 2:42 (original album version) 4:14 ("Live" hit version)
- Label: Regal Zonophone (UK); Deram (US)
- Composer: Gary Brooker
- Lyricist: Keith Reid
- Producer: Denny Cordell

"Conquistador" is a song by the English rock band Procol Harum. Written by Gary Brooker and Keith Reid, it originally appeared on the band's 1967 self-titled debut album. It was later released as a single from the band's 1972 live album Procol Harum Live: In Concert with the Edmonton Symphony Orchestra. It is one of the band's most famous and popular songs and their third Top 40 hit on the U.S. Billboard Hot 100 (after 1967's "A Whiter Shade of Pale" and "Homburg"), peaking at number 16.

== Background and composition ==
The song's lyrics were written by Keith Reid, and its music was composed by Gary Brooker, who also sang. It was featured on the band's 1967 album, Procol Harum. The song is unusual in that the music was written before the lyrics; according to Reid, "99 out of 100 of those Procol Harum songs were written the words first, and then were set to music." He explained that Brooker had written a piece of Spanish-flavored music before the band had officially formed, and Reid decided to write lyrics about a conquistador.

In August 1971, Procol Harum was invited to perform with the Edmonton Symphony Orchestra in Edmonton, Alberta. Procol Harum's equipment was hung up at the border; as a result the band and the orchestra only rehearsed "Conquistador" once ("All songs now played at least once.") before the show. Nonetheless, they began the concert with the song, and the concert was captured on the album Procol Harum Live: In Concert with the Edmonton Symphony Orchestra, of which "Conquistador" was the lead single.

== Lyrics ==
The narrator of "Conquistador" addresses the body of a dead conquistador lying on a beach, no doubt partially embedded in the sand and obviously not long after death or the corpse would not attract a vulture, nor would the "stallion" still be nearby. He at first jeers at the irony of the failure of the Conquistador's imagined mission, and the desolation of the scene and his corpse, but on reflection regrets his mockery and offers pity for the lonely and futile fate of the conquistador, "You did not conquer, only die." The refrain consists of the morose couplet:

And though I hoped for something to find
I could see no maze to unwind

with which the selection closes just before its instrumental trumpet coda, which gives it a mariachi-esque but mournful sound. The trumpet solo is played by principal trumpet Ed Nixon.

== Release and reception ==
Besides "A Whiter Shade of Pale", "Conquistador" was the band's highest charting single. It peaked at #16 on the Billboard Hot 100 on 29 July 1972, exactly five years to the date after "A Whiter Shade of Pale" ascended to its #5 peak, and helped catapult the album into the top five. "Conquistador" peaked at #22 on the UK Singles Chart. The song was generally well received by music critics. Cash Box said it was "at long last, the equal of their 'Whiter Shade Of Pale.'" Bruce Eder of AllMusic praised it as "the most accessible song" on Procol Harum Live In Concert with the Edmonton Symphony Orchestra, adding that "nothing else [on the album] matches it for sheer, bracing excitement." It was listed on Dave Thompson's 1000 Songs that Rock Your World.

== Personnel ==
1967 version

- Gary Brooker – piano, vocals
- Robin Trower – guitar
- Matthew Fisher – Hammond organ
- Dave Knights – bass guitar
- B.J. Wilson – drums
- Keith Reid – lyrics

1972 version

- Gary Brooker – piano and vocals
- Dave Ball – guitar
- Chris Copping – Hammond organ
- Alan Cartwright – bass guitar
- B.J. Wilson – drums
- Keith Reid – lyrics

== Chart performance ==
=== Weekly charts ===
Chart (1968)	Peak position
Australia (Go-Set)	33

Chart (1972)	Peak position
Australia KMR	4
Canada RPM Top Singles	7
Netherlands	8
New Zealand (Listener)	3
UK Singles Chart	22
U.S. Billboard Hot 100	16
U.S. Cash Box Top 100	18

=== Year-end charts ===
Chart (1972)	Rank
Australia	45
Canada	81
US (Joel Whitburn's Pop Annual)	141
