= Grand Hotel (album) =

Studio album by Procol Harum
- Released: March 1973
- Studios: AIR (London, UK)
- Genres: Progressive rock, symphonic rock
- Length: 41:01
- Labels: Chrysalis, Esoteric Recordings (2021 remaster), Repertoire (2000 German reissue)
- Producer: Chris Thomas

Procol Harum chronology
| Procol Harum Live: In Concert with the Edmonton Symphony Orchestra (1972) | Grand Hotel (1973) | Exotic Birds and Fruit (1974) |

Grand Hotel is the sixth studio album by Procol Harum. Released in 1973, it signalled a change of direction for the band. Guitarist Dave Ball, who had joined the band for their live album the previous year, left shortly after the photo shoot for the proposed album's cover, to be replaced by Mick Grabham. Grabham's head was superimposed on the front and back cover of the album on Ball's body (far left on the cover). Although the band had gone through significant personnel changes in previous years, the band would enter its most stable phase with this lineup.

The album reached No. 21 on the Billboard album charts. It peaked at No. 4 in Denmark, where the group was always well received.

Although Grand Hotel appears on the surface to be a concept album, the "concept", according to lyricist Keith Reid, doesn't extend beyond the title tune.

The single "A Souvenir of London" was banned by the BBC for the reference to venereal disease in its lyrics. Reid claimed that the song was really inspired (regardless of how it turned out and was interpreted) by a visit to a souvenir shop near George Martin's AIR Studios where the album was recorded. "Almost every album has had at least one comic song...and this one was a bit tongue in cheek" Reid stated as part of an interview for the 2009 CD reissue.

== Critical reception ==
In the June 1973 issue of Stereo Review, Grand Hotel appears in the “Best of the Month” section. Critic Steve Simels writes that Grand Hotel is Procol Harum’s “most mature, ambitious and moving yet” and “a legitimate rock masterpiece”.

Professional ratings
Review scores
| Source | Rating |
|---|---|
| Christgau's Record Guide | C |

Reviewing for Rolling Stone in 1973, Bud Scoppa called Grand Hotel a "confused and uneven transitional album" and "a collection of overblown production jobs that, at their worst, approach self-parody, and simpler, less grandiose tracks that suggest Procol Harum may yet find a way out of the corner they have worked themselves into." Village Voice critic Robert Christgau similarly noted the split in musical identity: "For years, these guys have vacillated between a menu of grits that certainly ain't groceries and larks' tongues in aspic. Despite their current white-tie conceit, they still haven't decided."

In a retrospective review, AllMusic's James A. Gardner gave the album three-and-a-half out of five stars and said the replacement of the band's original guitarist Robin Trower with the "capable, even powerful, but not nearly as distinctive" Mick Grabham resulted in a greater reliance on "ornate arrangements than guitar riffs, making this somewhat more dignified than either of their previous studio albums, Home and Broken Barricades."

== 2009 Salvo reissue ==
In 2009 Salvo reissued the CD remastered by Nick Robbins. Vocalist/keyboardist/composer Gary Brooker and lyricist Keith Reid supplemented the original CD with two bonus tracks. Both were "raw" tracks; i.e., they did not feature overdubs. One of the bonus tracks, "Bringing Home the Bacon", is the only one to feature former guitarist Dave Ball. The 2009 reissue also featured an essay by Patrick Humphries and was reissued in a cardboard sleeve.

== Record Store Day UK 2021 release ==
A newly remastered limited edition vinyl LP of Grand Hotel was released on Record Store Day UK, 12 June 2021 on the Esoteric Recordings label. This release was limited to 1000 copies in 180g white vinyl. Newly remastered from the original master tapes and cut at Abbey Road Studios, it has a gatefold sleeve and facsimile of the original lyric book.

== Track listing ==
All lyrics are written by Keith Reid; all music is composed by Gary Brooker.

Side one
| No. | Title | Length |
|---|---|---|
| 1. | "Grand Hotel" | 6:08 |
| 2. | "Toujours L'amour" | 3:32 |
| 3. | "A Rum Tale" | 3:21 |
| 4. | "T.V. Caesar" | 5:54 |

Side two
| No. | Title | Length |
|---|---|---|
| 1. | "A Souvenir of London" | 3:21 |
| 2. | "Bringing Home the Bacon" | 4:18 |
| 3. | "For Liquorice John" | 4:26 |
| 4. | "Fires (Which Burnt Brightly)" | 5:08 |
| 5. | "Robert's Box" | 4:49 |

Bonus tracks (2009 Salvo Records reissue)
| No. | Title | Length |
|---|---|---|
| 1. | "Grand Hotel" (raw track without orchestral) | 6:09 |
| 2. | "Bringing Home the Bacon" (raw track featuring Dave Ball) | 6:06 |

2018 remastered edition – disc one
| No. | Title | Length |
|---|---|---|
| 1. | "Grand Hotel" (raw track without orchestra) | 6:09 |
| 2. | "Bringing Home the Bacon" (Dave Ball-era recording) | 6:06 |
| 3. | "Toujours L'amour" (early take) | 3:40 |
| 4. | "Fires (Which Burn Brightly)" (early take) | 5:04 |
| 5. | "Robert's Box" (early take) | 4:39 |

2018 remastered edition – disc two : Live on RTBF TV, Belgium 1973 (DVD)
| No. | Title | Length |
|---|---|---|
| 1. | "Bringing Home the Bacon" |
| 2. | "Grand Hotel" |
| 3. | "Fires (Which Burnt Brightly)" |
| 4. | "A Salty Dog" |
| 5. | "A Rum Tale" |
| 6. | "Conquistador" |
| 7. | "For Liquorice John" |
| 8. | "Power Failure" |
| 9. | "A Souvenir of London" |

== Personnel ==
Procol Harum

- Gary Brooker – vocals, piano
- Mick Grabham – guitar
- Chris Copping – organ
- Alan Cartwright – bass guitar, acoustic bass
- B.J. Wilson – drums, percussion
- Keith Reid – lyrics

with:

- Christiane Legrand – vocals (track 8)
- The Pahene Recorder Ensemble – guest appearance (6)

Technical

- John Punter – engineer
- Spencer Zahn – artwork, design
- Jeffrey Weisel – photography, drawings in internal booklet

== Charts ==
| Chart (1973) | Peak position |
|---|---|
| Australian Albums (Kent Music Report) | 28 |
| Austrian Albums (Ö3 Austria) | 6 |
| Canada Top Albums/CDs (RPM) | 18 |
| Dutch Albums (Album Top 100) | 9 |
| Finnish Albums (The Official Finnish Charts) | 6 |
| German Albums (Offizielle Top 100) | 24 |
| Norwegian Albums (VG-lista) | 8 |
| US Billboard 200 | 21 |

== Certifications ==
| Region | Certification | Certified units/sales |
|---|---|---|
| United Kingdom (BPI) | Silver | 60,000^{^} |
^{^} Shipments figures based on certification alone.

== Legacy ==
Douglas Adams claimed that the idea for The Restaurant at the End of the Universe was inspired by the title track, "which he wanted to run throughout the whole Milliways section" (of the original BBC Radio series of The Hitch Hiker's Guide to the Galaxy). However, according to the show's producer, Geoffrey Perkins, "Douglas was unable to explain clearly what connection it actually had" with the concept and so the idea was abandoned.
