= Procol Harum (album) =

Studio album by Procol Harum
- Released: September 1967
- Recorded: April–June 1967
- Studios: Olympic, London
- Genres: Psychedelic rock, proto-prog
- Length: 35:05
- Labels: Regal Zonophone (UK); Deram (US)
- Producer: Denny Cordell

Procol Harum chronology
Procol Harum (1967)	Shine On Brightly (1968)

Procol Harum is the debut studio album by the English rock band Procol Harum. It was released in September 1967 by record label Deram in the US, following their breakthrough and immensely popular single "A Whiter Shade of Pale". The track does not appear on the UK version of the album, but was included on the US issue. The UK version of the album was released in December 1967 by record label Regal Zonophone.

== Writing ==
All songs were originally credited to Gary Brooker (music) and Keith Reid (lyrics), except "Repent Walpurgis" written by Matthew Fisher, after works by French organist Charles-Marie Widor and German composer Johann Sebastian Bach.

In 2005, Matthew Fisher filed suit in the Royal Courts of Justice against Gary Brooker and his publisher, claiming that Fisher co-wrote the music for "A Whiter Shade of Pale". On 30 July 2009, the House of Lords issued a final verdict on the case in Fisher's favour. A lower court had ruled in Fisher's favour in 2006, granting him co-writing credits and a share of the royalties. A higher court partly overturned the ruling in 2008, giving Fisher co-writing credit but no money. The Court of Appeal had previously held that Fisher had waited too long to bring his claim to court. The House of Lords disagreed, stating there was no time limitation for such claims. Lord David Neuberger of Abbotsbury's opinion stated: "Fisher's subsequent contribution was significant, and, especially the introductory eight bars, an important factor in the work's success...".

Procol Harum's lyricist Keith Reid told Songfacts that the music for "Conquistador" was written before the lyrics. He added that this was unusual as "99 out of 100" of the Procol Harum songs, back then, "were written the words first, and then were set to music."

== Recording ==
The track "Salad Days (Are Here Again)" is credited as being from the film Separation.

== Release ==
Procol Harum was released in September 1967 in the US, and in December 1967 in the UK. Though the album was recorded on multitrack, it was issued as mono-only in the UK, and in mono and rechannelled stereo in the US. Despite extensive searching, the original multitrack tapes have not been located and thus a stereo mix of the original ten tracks may never be possible. Several alternate takes, however, have been mixed into stereo and are available on CD. As recently as 2004, the original single, mixed to stereo, has appeared on a "Dick Bartley Presents: Classic Oldies" compilation on Eric Records.

The original North American release included a poster of the album cover. The artwork by Dickinson, the then-girlfriend, and subsequently wife of Keith Reid was heavily influenced by the style of the late-Victorian illustrator Aubrey Beardsley.

The album has been repackaged and reissued many times. Two of the significant reissues are Procol Harum...Plus!, a 1998 CD compilation on the Westside label including all the songs from both the Deram and Regal Zonophone release, plus "Homburg" (the group's second single) and nine additional tracks from the period; and a monaural audiophile vinyl LP edition released in 2003 by Classic Records, with yet a different track order, including "Homburg" as the opening track and without "A Whiter Shade of Pale" or "Good Captain Clack". The set includes bonus singles of the original monaural and alternate stereo versions of "A Whiter Shade of Pale". A 2009 remaster by Salvo Records, using the original mono masters, was released, with bonus tracks including the singles "A Whiter Shade of Pale", "Homburg", B-sides and alternate stereo takes. However, many of the tracks are played at a higher speed. A 2015 remaster by Esoteric Recordings expands the album into a 2-CD set.

A live version of the track "Conquistador", from the album Procol Harum Live with the Edmonton Symphony Orchestra, was released as a single in 1972 and charted to #16 in the US on the Billboard Hot 100 after 10 weeks on the chart.

== Reception ==
Professional ratings
Review scores
Source	Rating
AllMusic	4/5 stars
Classic Rock	7/10
Crawdaddy!	(favourable)
MusicHound Rock	3.5/5 stars

In his retrospective review of the album, Bruce Eder of AllMusic wrote: "Not everything here works, but it holds up better than most psychedelic or progressive rock." Melody Maker described the album as a "very pleasant and thoughtful set".

== Legacy ==
The album was included on Classic Rock magazine's list "50 Albums That Built Prog Rock". It was included in Rolling Stone's 2007 list of "The 40 Essential Albums of 1967".

In a major Tate Britain exhibition of the work of Aubrey Beardsley during 4 March – 25 May 2020, the Procol Harum album cover was shown alongside The Beatles Revolver artwork by Klaus Voormann to show how interest in Beardsley's monochrome pen-and-ink style was revived in the 1960s.

== Track listing ==
All lyrics are written by Keith Reid except as noted; all music is composed by Gary Brooker except as noted.

Side A
No.	Title	Length
1.	"Conquistador"	2:42
2.	"She Wandered Through the Garden Fence" ( (Note: Two versions of this song were released—one with a "firm" ending, not a fade-out))	3:29
3.	"Something Following Me"	3:40
4.	"Mabel"	1:55
5.	"Cerdes (Outside the Gates of)"	5:07

Side B
No.	Title	Writer(s)	Length
1.	"A Christmas Camel"		4:54
2.	"Kaleidoscope"		2:57
3.	"Salad Days (Are Here Again)" ( (Note: From the film Separation, 1968))		3:44
4.	"Good Captain Clack"		1:32
5.	"Repent Walpurgis"	Matthew Fisher	5:05

=== US version ===
Side A
No.	Title	Writer(s)	Length
1.	"A Whiter Shade of Pale"	Brooker, Fisher, Reid	4:04
2.	"She Wandered Through the Garden Fence"		3:18
3.	"Something Following Me"		3:37
4.	"Mabel"		1:50
5.	"Cerdes (Outside the Gates of)"		5:04

Side B
No.	Title	Writer(s)	Length
1.	"A Christmas Camel"		4:48
2.	"Conquistador"		2:38
3.	"Kaleidoscope/Salad Days (Are Here Again)"		6:31
4.	"Repent Walpurgis"	Fisher	5:05

=== German version ===
Side A
No.	Title	Length
1.	"Homburg"	3:55
2.	"She Wandered Through the Garden Fence"	3:29
3.	"Something Following Me"	3:40
4.	"Mabel"	1:55
5.	"Cerdes (Outside the Gates of)"	5:07

Side B
No.	Title	Writer(s)	Length
1.	"A Christmas Camel"		4:54
2.	"Kaleidoscope"		2:57
3.	"Salad Days (Are Here Again)"		3:44
4.	"Conquistador"		2:42
5.	"Repent Walpurgis"	Fisher	5:05

=== 2015 Esoteric Recordings 2-disc deluxe edition ===
Disc One - Original Album Released as Regal Zonophone LRZ 1001 December 1967
No.	Title	Length
1.	"Conquistador"
2.	"She Wandered Through the Garden Fence"
3.	"Something Following Me"
4.	"Mabel"
5.	"Cerdes (Outside the Gates of)"
6.	"A Christmas Camel"
7.	"Kaleidoscope"
8.	"Salad Days (Are Here Again)"
9.	"Good Captain Clack"
10.	"Repent Walpurgis"
11.	"A Whiter Shade of Pale" (single version)
12.	"Lime Street Blues" (single version)
13.	"Homburg" (single version)
14.	"Good Captain Clack" (single version)
15.	"Alpha" (previously unreleased)
16.	"Salad Days (Are Here Again)"
17.	"Understandably Blue" (previously unreleased)
18.	"Pandora's Box" (previously unreleased instrumental)
19.	"Cerdes (Outside the Gates of)" (alternate mono mix)
20.	"Something Following Me" (alternate mono mix)

Disc Two
No.	Title	Length
1.	"A Whiter Shade of Pale" (extended early version - March 1967)
2.	"Homburg" (extended stereo version)
3.	"Repent Walpurgis" (extended stereo version - August 1967)
4.	"Conquistador" (1971 stereo mix)
5.	"She Wandered Through the Garden Fence" (1971 stereo mix)
6.	"Something Following Me" (stereo mix)
7.	"Mabel" (undubbed stereo mix)
8.	"Kaleidoscope" (stereo mix)
9.	"Cerdes (Outside the Gates of)" (stereo mix)
10.	"Homburg" (1971 stereo mix)
11.	"Morning Dew" (BBC Easybeat session June 14, 1967 - previously unavailable)
12.	"A Whiter Shade of Pale" (BBC Easybeat session June 14, 1967 - previously unavailable)
13.	"Mabel" (BBC Easybeat session June 14, 1967 - previously unavailable)
14.	"Homburg" (BBC Top Gear session September 27, 1967 - previously unavailable)
15.	"Good Captain Clack" (BBC Top Gear session September 27, 1967 - previously unavailable)
16.	"She Wandered Through the Garden Fence" (BBC Top Gear session September 27, 1967 - previously unavailable)
17.	"Kaleidoscope" (BBC Top Gear session September 27, 1967 - previously unavailable)

== Personnel ==
Procol Harum

- Gary Brooker – vocals, piano
- Robin Trower – guitar (all but US 1)
- Matthew Fisher – Hammond organ
- Dave Knights – bass
- B. J. Wilson – drums (all but US 1)
- Ray Royer – guitar (US 1)
- Keith Reid – lyrics

Additional personnel

- Bill Eyden – drums (US 1)

Technical

- Simon Platz – executive producer (for Fly Records)
- Eddy Offord, Frank Owen, Gerald Chevin, Keith Grant, Laurence Burridge – engineer
- Dickinson – front cover art

== Charts ==
Chart (1968)	Peak position
German Albums (Offizielle Top 100)	30
US Billboard 200	47

== Certifications ==
Region	Certification	Certified units/sales
France (SNEP)	Gold	110,000
United Kingdom	—	50,000
