= Procol Harum – In Concert with the Danish National Concert Orchestra and Choir =

In Concert With the Danish National Concert Orchestra and Choir

Live album by Procol Harum
- Released: 26 May 2009
- Recorded: 20 August 2006
- Genres: Progressive rock, symphonic rock
- Length: DVD 1:31:15
- Label: Eagle Records
- Producers: Gary Brooker, Chris Cooke, Jens Hofman

Procol Harum chronology
| One Eye to the Future – Live in Italy 2007 (2008) | In Concert With the Danish National Concert Orchestra and Choir (2009) | The Spirit of Nøkken (2010) |

Professional ratings
Review scores
| Source | Rating |
|---|---|
| AllMusic | 4/5 stars |

In Concert with the Danish National Concert Orchestra and Choir, by Procol Harum, is a live album released 2009. It was recorded in Ledreborg Castle in Denmark.

This album is also noteworthy because it contains a song that Procol Harum have never released before - "Symphathy [sic] for the Hard of Hearing". This is a song about the Second World War that was previously on Gary Brooker's solo album "Lead Me to the Water". The CD has 10 Songs, the track list here is from DVD.

== Track listing ==
1. "Grand Hotel" (Gary Brooker, Keith Reid) - 7:21
2. "Something Magic" (Brooker, Reid) - 4:00
3. "Butterfly Boys" (Gary Brooker, Keith Reid) - 4:48 (DVD Track)
4. "Homburg" (Brooker, Reid) - 5:00
5. "The VIP Room" (Brooker, Reid) - 4:43 (DVD Track)
6. "Fires (Which Burnt Brightly)" (Brooker, Reid) - 5:55
7. "Nothing But the Truth" (Brooker, Reid) - 3:51 (DVD Track)
8. "Into the Flood" (Brooker, Noble, Reid) - 5:54
9. "Simple Sister"(Brooker, Reid) - 4:48 (DVD Track)
10. "A Salty Dog" (Brooker, Reid) - 6:30
11. "An Old English Dream" (Brooker, Reid) - 5:14 (DVD Track)
12. "Symphathy for the Hard of Hearing" (Brooker) - 8:10
13. "A Whiter Shade of Pale" (Brooker, Matthew Fisher, Reid) - 8:47
14. "Whaling Stories" (Brooker, Reid) - 10:15
15. "Conquistador" (Brooker, Reid) - 5:20

== Personnel ==
Procol Harum

- Gary Brooker - piano and vocals
- Mark Brzezicki- drums
- Matt Pegg - bass guitar
- Josh Phillips - organ
- Geoff Whitehorn - guitar
- Keith Reid - lyrics
