= Dave Ball (guitarist) =

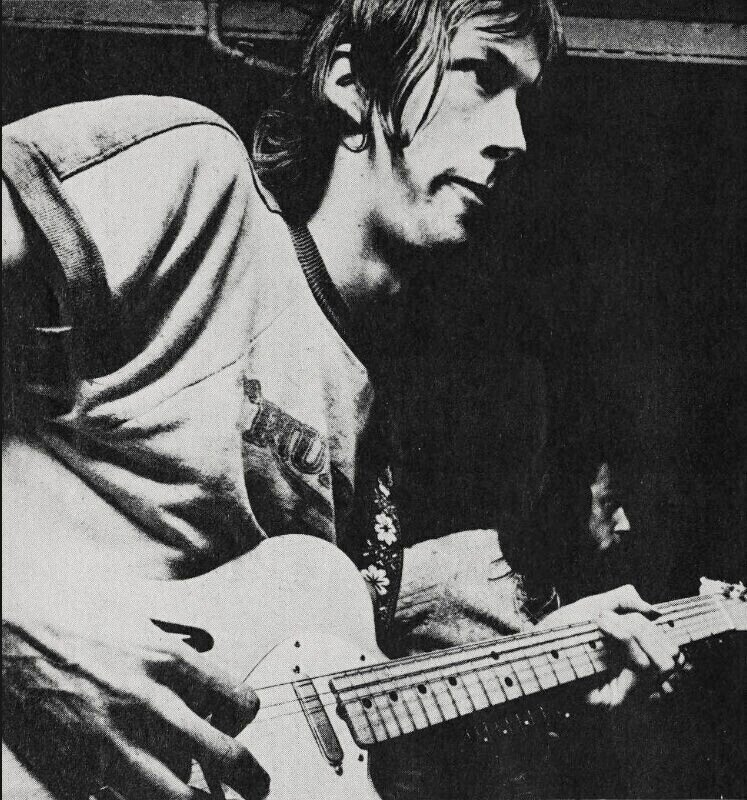
- Ball with Procol Harum c. 1972

Background information
- Born: David J. Ball; 30 March 1950; Handsworth, Birmingham, England
- Died: 1 April 2015 (aged 65) Melbourne, Australia
- Genre: Rock
- Occupation: Musician
- Instrument: Guitar
- Years active: 1963–2015
- Formerly of: Procol Harum

David J. Ball (30 March 1950 – 1 April 2015) was an English guitar player. He was a member of Procol Harum from 1971 to 1972, playing on the group's highest-selling album Procol Harum Live: In Concert with the Edmonton Symphony Orchestra.

== Biography ==
=== Early life ===
Ball was born on 30 March 1950 to a musical family in Birmingham, England. Ball was raised in a Catholic household, but became an atheist at age 15, stating in an interview that "when I stopped believing in Christian religion, I started looking for something else to belong to, so at a very young age I started reading things like Marx and Eastern philosophy and theology books that I didn’t understand a lot, and I started reading very widely: Jungian philosophy, Wittgenstein and Kant".

Ball joined his first serious band, The Rockin' Perfidias (later renamed The Deadbeats), in 1963, which included his elder brothers Pete and Denny; while initially wanting to be a drummer, Ball ended up as the group's rhythm guitarist. Ball later played in various bands in the Birmingham scene, including a Cream-inspired power trio called Ideal Milk, which included his brother Denny on bass and Cozy Powell on drums. The trio contacted Ace Kefford after his dismissal from The Move in mid-1968, forming the short-lived Ace Kefford Stand. The group's sole single, featuring an A-side cover of "For Your Love", was the first-ever single released on the Atlantic label in the UK. The B-side, "Gravy Booby Jamm", was written by the group. Explaining the Ace Kefford Stand's downfall in a 2015 interview, Ball asserted that "we never got the material with Ace, we didn’t have a good set of songs to do, so that was one of the major reasons why that failed – none of us was writing."

The Ace Kefford Stand had effectively broken up (due in part to poor management and Kefford's own mental instability), but they were still contractually obligated to release one more single for Atlantic. "This World's An Apple", recycling the B-side "Gravy Booby Jamm", was released under "Big Bertha featuring Ace Kefford" in reference to the new group that the Ball brothers and Powell were forming. Ball co-founded Big Bertha with the intention of creating a melodic, harmony-rich, and pop-oriented sound similar to Vanilla Fudge and The Zombies, thus bringing in his brother Pete on Hammond organ. Ball was displeased with the "screamy," Robert Plant-esque vocals of the band's initial singer, Peter French (who would later find fame with Atomic Rooster and Cactus), and so he replaced French with Dave MacTavish. Unfortunately, Big Bertha suffered from poor management, only released one single ("Munich City" b/w "Funky Woman"), and dissolved shortly after Powell was hired by Jeff Beck for his group.

=== Procol Harum stint ===
In April 1971, Ball saw an advertisement placed by Procol Harum in Melody Maker seeking a replacement for the recently departed Robin Trower. Ball, unaware of any of the band's output since "Homburg", was initially uninterested, but after a week, he decided to apply for an audition.

Ball personally suspected that his hiring was less due to his musical abilities and more so due to his jestful personality. As he detailed in a May 2012 interview,

"They were clearly fed up with the whole process, so I said 'Anybody fancy a beer?' at which point they all started smiling and agreeing that this was a fine idea, so we went down the road to the local pub. [We] drank steadily for a while swapping jokes and generally getting on really well, then I just said – thanks, see you later...and walked (or staggered) off to the Tube to go home. I really didn’t expect anything to come of it, but first thing the next morning I had a call from their office saying you’re in!"

Ball, now at age 21, landed the job with Procol Harum. Being largely unfamiliar with the band's material, he had to quickly learn it within a month. In the ensuing eighteen months, Procol Harum toured non-stop in North America, Europe, and Japan. He can be heard on the group's live album, Procol Harum Live with the Edmonton Symphony Orchestra, but left the group during the recording sessions for their 1973 album Grand Hotel, in September 1972. Mick Grabham's head was superimposed over Ball's body on the album art. In later years, Ball often cited his contentious relationship with drummer B. J. Wilson as the principal reason for his abrupt departure.

=== Later career ===
After leaving Procol Harum, Ball briefly collaborated with Long John Baldry and played guitar on his 1973 album Good to Be Alive. He then reunited with his brother Denny and Cozy Powell to form a new group called Bedlam, which also included Frank Aiello on vocals. In 1973, Bedlam released an eponymous album produced by Felix Pappalardi on Chrysalis Records, then embarked on an American tour supporting fellowing Birmingham band Black Sabbath. However, Bedlam soon ran into trouble when they learned that Chrysalis Records rejected the option of a second album with the band. Cozy Powell and the group's manager pursued a contract with pop producer Mickie Most, which inspired Ball, who always conceived of Bedlam as a "heavy" band, to reluctantly quit.

By late 1974, Ball felt burned out with the music industry and ostensibly gave up playing guitar. Turning down an offer to play with Peter Frampton and wanting to change his currently self-destructive lifestyle, Ball decided to join the Army, ultimately serving for five years and being stationed on St Kilda. Ball later worked in computer programming.

He also played in the Nickey Barclay Band in London in the 1980s. In 1988, while working in Oman, he performed in the band Rashid Goes To Nizwa.

He last played with Gary Brooker of Procol Harum in London, in July 2007. He also sometimes played with the Procol Harum tribute band, The Palers. In 2012 he released a solo album titled Don't Forget Your Alligator.

Three years after being diagnosed with the disease, Ball died of bowel cancer on 1 April 2015, two days after his 65th birthday. Ball died in Melbourne, Australia, leaving behind two sons and one daughter.
