= Procol Harum Live: In Concert with the Edmonton Symphony Orchestra =

Live album by Procol Harum
- Released: April 1972
- Recorded: 18 November 1971
- Venues: Northern Alberta Jubilee Auditorium, Edmonton
- Genres: Progressive rock, symphonic rock
- Length: 41:39
- Labels: Chrysalis (UK); A&M (US)
- Producer: Chris Thomas

Procol Harum chronology
| Broken Barricades (1971) | Procol Harum Live: In Concert with the Edmonton Symphony Orchestra (1972) | Grand Hotel (1973) |

Professional ratings
Review scores
| Source | Rating |
|---|---|
| AllMusic | 4/5 stars |
| Christgau's Record Guide | B− |
| Encyclopedia of Popular Music | 4/5 stars |

Procol Harum Live: In Concert with the Edmonton Symphony Orchestra, by the English band Procol Harum together with the Edmonton Symphony Orchestra, was released in 1972; it was recorded at the Northern Alberta Jubilee Auditorium, in Edmonton, Alberta, Canada on 18 November 1971. The album reached No. 7 in Canada and was very successful on the Billboard Top 200, peaking at No. 5. It is the band's best-selling album, certified Gold by the RIAA. The live version of "Conquistador" from this album became a popular hit on both pop and progressive radio in the United States and reached the top 20 of the Billboard Hot 100, and the top 10 in several other countries.

== Track listing ==
Lyrics for all songs by Keith Reid; music composed by Gary Brooker, except "In Held 'Twas in I" co-authored by Matthew Fisher.

1. "Conquistador" - 5:02
2. "Whaling Stories" - 7:41
3. "A Salty Dog" - 5:34
4. "All This and More" - 4:22
5. "In Held 'Twas in I": - 19:00

a) "Glimpses of Nirvana"
b) "'Twas Teatime at the Circus"
c) "In the Autumn of My Madness"
d) "Look to Your Soul"
e) "Grand Finale"

- A live version of "Luskus Delph" (Brooker, Reid) from the album Broken Barricades is also included on recent CD reissues (it had originally been the B-side of the "Conquistador" single, CHS 2003). The 2009 Salvo reissue also includes rehearsal takes of "Simple Sister" and "Shine On Brightly" as additional bonus tracks.
- Some LP copies of the album also have "Look to Your Soul" credited as "I Know If I'd Been Wiser".

== Personnel ==
Procol Harum

- Chris Copping – organ, harpsichord
- Alan Cartwright – bass
- B. J. Wilson – drums
- Dave Ball – guitar
- Gary Brooker – vocals, piano
- Keith Reid – lyrics

with:

- The Edmonton Symphony Orchestra
- Lawrence Leonard, conductor
- Da Camera Singers

Technical

- Wally Heider, Ray Thompson, Tom Scott, Ken Caillat, Biff Dawes - recording engineers

== Charts ==
| Chart (1972) | Peak position |
|---|---|
| Australian Albums (Kent Music Report) | 12 |
| Canada Top Albums/CDs (RPM) | 7 |
| Dutch Albums (Album Top 100) | 2 |
| German Albums (Offizielle Top 100) | 30 |
| Norwegian Albums (VG-lista) | 23 |
| UK Albums (Official Charts) | 48 |
| US Billboard 200 | 5 |

== Certifications ==
| Region | Certification | Certified units/sales |
|---|---|---|
| Canada (Music Canada) | Gold | 50,000^{^} |
| United States (RIAA) | Gold | 500,000^{^} |
^{^} Shipments figures based on certification alone.
