= Alan Cartwright =

British musician (1945–2021)

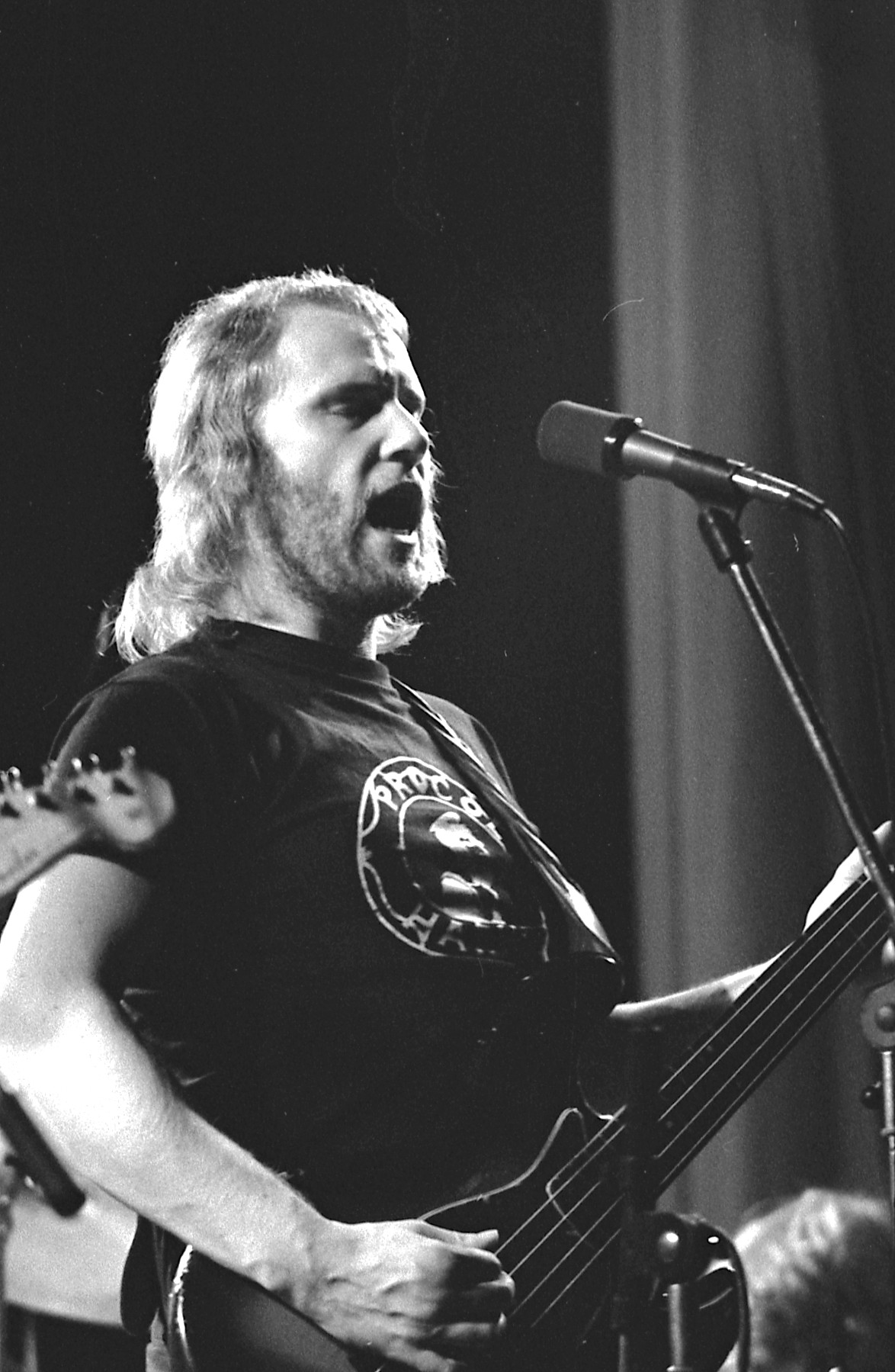
Alan Cartwright.

Alan George Cartwright (10 October 1945 – 4 March 2021) was an English bass player.

He was born in London. Before joining Procol Harum in 1972 he played with the Freddie Mack Show together with fellow Harum band member B.J. Wilson and Roger Warwick. Cartwright's incorporation allowed Chris Copping to concentrate solely on the organ parts. The first Procol Harum album he worked on is the group's only official live album, Procol Harum Live with the Edmonton Symphony Orchestra. He continued touring and recording with the group until their penultimate album Procol's Ninth, after which Copping once again took over on bass. After retiring from music, Cartwright spent many years in charge of the bar and social events at Bush Hill Park Bowls & Tennis Club, Enfield.

Cartwright died on 4 March 2021, at the age of 75, having been diagnosed with stomach cancer in 2020.
