= Procol Harum =

English rock band

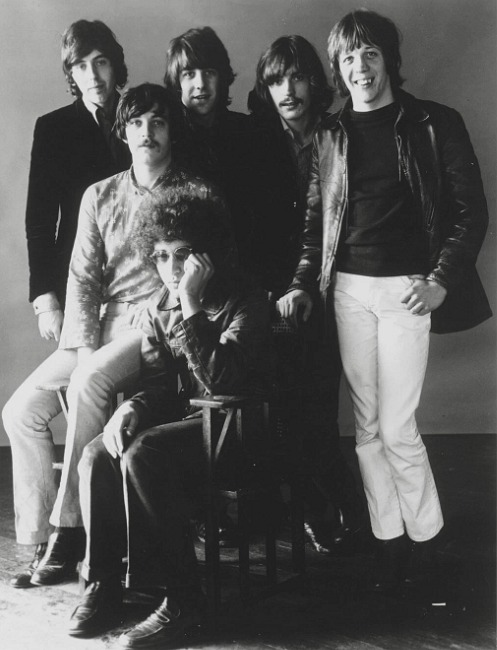
- Procol Harum c. 1968; Seated, from left: Gary Brooker, Keith Reid; Standing, from left: David Knights, B. J. Wilson, Matthew Fisher, Robin Trower

Background information
- Also known as: The Pinewoods (1967), Liquorice John Death (1970)
- Origin: Southend-on-Sea, Essex, England
- Genres: Progressive rock; proto-prog; art rock; psychedelia
- Works: Procol Harum discography
- Years active: 1967–1977; 1991–2022
- Labels: Fly; Regal Zonophone; Reprise (US); A&M; Chrysalis; Deram; DJM
- Past members: Gary Brooker; Keith Reid; Matthew Fisher; David Knights; Bobby Harrison; Ray Royer; B. J. Wilson; Robin Trower; Chris Copping; Alan Cartwright; Dave Ball; Mick Grabham; Pete Solley; Dee Murray; Tim Renwick; Dave Bronze; Mark Brzezicki; Geoff Whitehorn; Jerry Stevenson; Don Snow; Laurence Cottle; Ian Wallace; Josh Phillips; Matt Pegg; Graham Broad; Henry Spinetti; Geoff Dunn

Procol Harum (/ˈproʊkəl ˈhɑːrəm/) were an English rock band formed in Southend-on-Sea, Essex, in 1967. Their best-known recording is the 1967 hit single "A Whiter Shade of Pale", one of the few singles to have sold more than 10 million copies. Although noted for their baroque and classical influence, Procol Harum's music is described as psychedelic rock and proto-prog with hints of the blues, R&B, and soul.

In 2018, the band was honoured by the Rock and Roll Hall of Fame when "A Whiter Shade of Pale" was inducted into the new Singles category. They had previously been nominated as performers in 2012.

== History ==
=== Formation ===
In 1966, after Southend-on-Sea-based group The Paramounts were unable to generate any follow-up success with their UK top 40 single "Poison Ivy", the group disbanded. Their frontman Gary Brooker decided to retire from performing and focus on songwriting, and his old friend Guy Stevens introduced him to lyricist Keith Reid. In April 1967, after several months writing together while failing to find any artists interested in performing their songs, Brooker and Reid decided to form their own band and use their songs as their sole material. Brooker, in addition to vocals and the piano, was also proficient on the organ, trombone, cornet, piano accordion and Bengal flute.

Paramounts' drummer Barrie "B. J." Wilson agreed to stay on and rehearse for the new group and auditions brought them bassist David Knights and two members of George Bean and the Runners, Richard Brown (guitar) and Alan Morris (organ). But the lack of gigs and money led to the dispersal of this grouping before they even got out of the rehearsal hall, with only Knights staying on.

They next teamed with organist Matthew Fisher, who had left Screaming Lord Sutch's backing group The Savages and advertised for work. Reid said he was right for Procol Harum just from talking to him and decided before hearing him play. Guitarist Ray Royer was chosen after the group placed an advertisement for players and were inundated, so the band "really grilled the applicants" to find "someone with the right state of mind". Reid said bassist David Knights had also been chosen in a similar manner to Fisher, in that he was right for the group "as a person", and had an original playing style. Drummer Bobby Harrison completed the line-up, after the group had tried out up to nine drummers by this point. Reid said Harrison was the first that the band "could really work with", and had a sense of humour that helped balance out the more serious personality that Reid and the rest of the band had. The band chose Stevens as their manager.

The group named themselves after a male blue Burmese cat, which had been bred by Eleonore Vogt-Chapman and belonged to Liz Coombes, a friend. Stevens suggested the group name themselves after the cat, which the group immediately accepted. However, the cat's pedigree name was in fact Procul Harun, the Procul being the breeder's prefix, but the name was taken down over the telephone, leading to a misspelling. Although people have inferred that the name is Latin for "beyond these things", this is incorrect, as the correct term would be procul hīs.

=== "A Whiter Shade of Pale", "Homburg" and debut album (1967–1968) ===
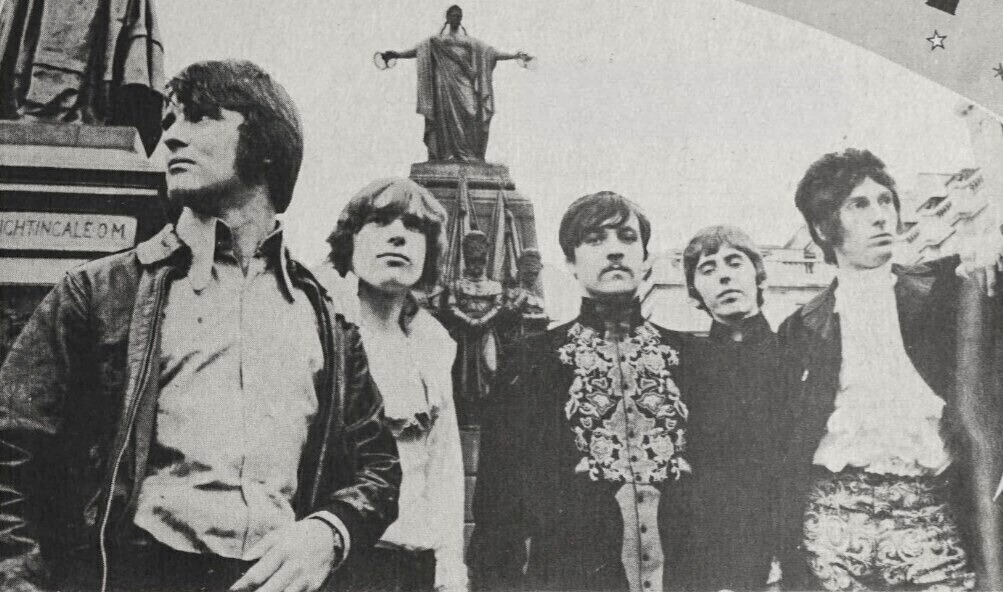
The original lineup of Procol Harum at the Guards Crimean War Memorial. L to R: Bobby Harrison, Matthew Fisher, Gary Brooker, David Knights, Ray Royer.

In April 1967 the group entered Olympic Studios in London to record their debut single, "A Whiter Shade of Pale". They were joined by session drummer Bill Eyden in place of Harrison (though Harrison did play on the B-side "Lime Street Blues"), producer Denny Cordell and sound engineer Keith Grant. With a structure reminiscent of Baroque music, the song features a countermelody loosely based on Johann Sebastian Bach's Orchestral Suite No. 3 in D Major played by Fisher's Hammond organ. An enthusiastic response from listeners of the pirate radio station Radio London prompted Deram Records to rush-release the single for 12 May 1967. It was an instant worldwide success, reaching No. 1 on the UK Singles Chart for six weeks and the same spot in eleven countries. In three weeks, it became the fastest selling record by a new group. In the US, it peaked at No. 5 and the song has since sold over 10 million copies worldwide. Around the same time, Cordell suggested that Jonathan Weston be brought in to co‑manage the band with Stevens.

Procol Harum played their first live gig at London's Speakeasy club on the day "A Whiter Shade of Pale" was released on 12 May 1967. They performed a set of mostly Brooker/Reid songs mixed with covers of Bob Dylan, The Rascals and Tim Rose tunes. Jimi Hendrix was an early vocal supporter of the band and attended their first show where, at the start of their performance of Bonnie Dobson's "Morning Dew" (which Rose claimed was his), he went on stage, took Knights' bass and joined in.

After 18 June 1967, the group would not play live in the UK until the following year.

On 15 July 1967, the group announced the June departure of Royer and Harrison prior to the recording of the first album, both of whom immediately went on to form the group Freedom, as well as their replacing Weston as manager. Fisher later said that the major issue for the split with Weston was when he organised an extensive UK tour for Procol Harum too soon after the release of "A Whiter Shade of Pale", resulting in the group performing "for £60 per night instead of £500." Following the addition of guitarist Robin Trower and the return of B. J. Wilson, the band secured new management under Tony Secunda. The departures brought about what Brooker described as "great lawsuits and expense" from Royer, Harrison, and Weston, and initial session drummer Eyden filed his own suit. Roughly three months into their partnership with Secunda, the band hired two Americans, Bennett Glotzer and Ronnie Lyons, to manage them in the US.

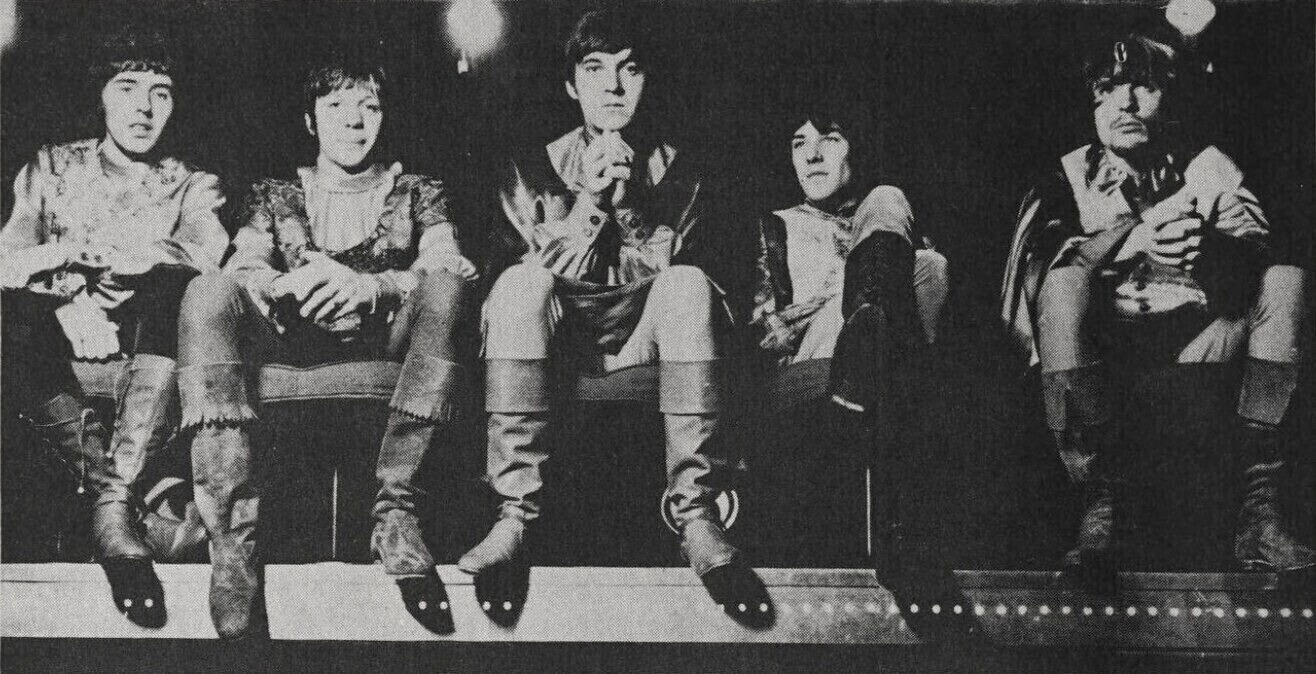
Procol Harum c. early 1968. L to R: Knights, Robin Trower, Brooker, B.J. Wilson, Fisher.

The group's follow-up single, "Homburg", was released in September 1967. The song reached No. 6 in the UK and No. 34 in the US. In the same month their debut album, Procol Harum, recorded between the two hit singles, was released in the US. Brooker said its release soon after the singles put the band in good stead in the US, but the problems created by the line-up changes, subsequent lawsuits and new management delayed its release in the UK until December. Brooker said it was at this point where the band "had lost the British audience."

=== Shine on Brightly to Something Magic and break-up (1968–1977) ===
The band's follow-up album, Shine on Brightly was released the following year and saw a greater excursion into progressive rock stylings. It reached number 24 in the US but failed to chart in the UK. Finding themselves labelled as one-hit wonders in their home country, while in the US their reputation as a live act only continued to improve, for the next several years Procol Harum spent most of their time touring America.

Their third album, A Salty Dog (1969), was popular among fans and their first album to sell well in the UK. The title track in particular gained a good deal of US FM radio airplay, and the album is now considered a rock classic, appealing to fans of The Beatles, The Moody Blues and Pink Floyd. Procol Harum were asked to perform at the Woodstock Festival in August 1969, but were unable after Trower's wife was expecting a baby and needed to return to England.

Later in 1969, Fisher finally decided to leave the band. In addition to the friction caused by the songwriting credits on "A Whiter Shade of Pale", Fisher had wanted to play a bigger role in writing song lyrics for the band, feeling that Keith Reid's output was growing repetitive. When his proposals were rebuffed, Fisher opted to leave instead. As Brooker would later comment: "I remember Matthew [Fisher] moaning and wanting to leave in about the fourth week [after forming the band], and he went on moaning and wanting to leave until eventually we only had to agree that it would be best". When Fisher told Knights of his plan to leave, Knights resolved that it was the time for him to leave as well. Fisher and Knights were replaced by Chris Copping, another former member of The Paramounts, who played both organ and bass.The first album featuring this four-piece lineup was Home, released in June 1970. Shortly thereafter, the group appeared at the 1970 Isle of Wight Festival.

By 1971, the disparities in style had become too great and, after the release of their fifth album Broken Barricades, Trower left to form his own power trio. He was replaced by Dave Ball, while Alan Cartwright (a former bandmate of Wilson's in Freddie Mack's band) took over bass from Copping, who remained on organ.

In mid-1971, Procol Harum severed ties with Glotzer and Lyons and legally fought an accounting dispute which was settled out of court. The band went on to sign with Chrysalis Records and completed a successful UK tour opening for Jethro Tull.

During the band's 1971 tour, Procol Harum recorded their show on 18 November in Edmonton, Alberta with the Edmonton Symphony Orchestra and a choir for a live album. Released in April 1972, Procol Harum Live: In Concert with the Edmonton Symphony Orchestra was met with commercial success when it peaked at No. 5 in the US, where it was certified gold for selling 500,000 copies. In the UK, it peaked at No. 48. The live rendition of "Conquistador" from their debut album reached No. 16 in the US and No. 22 in the UK.

After Dave Ball left, Mick Grabham was the group's guitarist from 1972 until 1977.

The band continued with their new symphonic rock sound on their follow-up, Grand Hotel. Released in March 1973, the album reached No. 21 in the US. It did not chart in the UK, but it was certified silver for selling over 60,000 copies there.

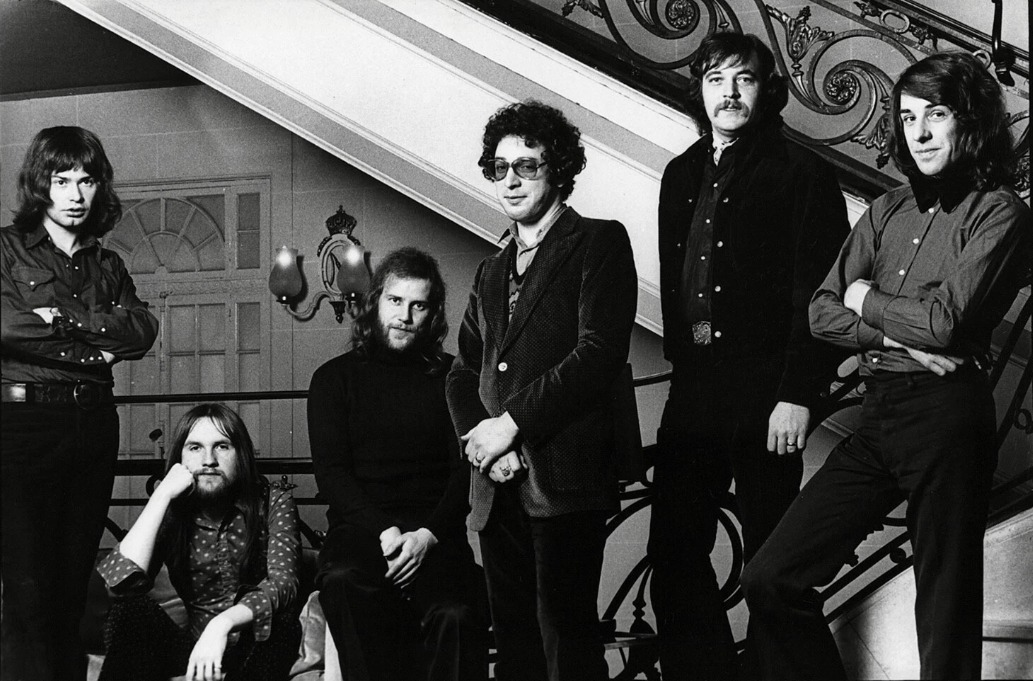
Procol Harum in 1973. L to R: Chris Copping, Mick Grabham, Alan Cartwright, Keith Reid, Brooker, Wilson.

The band returned to its hard rock roots with their seventh studio album Exotic Birds and Fruit, released in April 1974. Reid said the group made a conscious attempt to "dispel that symphonic image" that they had been attached to and has a similar sound to their debut. The album's sleeve was absent of lyrics in the liner notes.

In 1975 Procol Harum played the final night at the Rainbow Theatre in London before its refurbishment.

The personnel changes contributed to declining sales in the later part of the 1970s, with "Pandora's Box" being the final UK Top 20 hit in 1975. Its parent album Procol's Ninth saw a re-connection with Jerry Leiber and Mike Stoller, who both produced and wrote with the band.

In 1976 the band regrouped to record their final album of the 1970s, Something Magic. This marked the departure of Cartwright, after Brooker thought Copping was a better bassist which led to the arrival of newcomer Pete Solley on keyboards. The album's producers were not impressed with the group's material, which took the form of "The Worm and the Tree", an extended track that originated from a theme of Brooker's that the band had attempted some years before, but the group "made it up as we went along" in the studio.

Something Magic was released in March 1977 and peaked at No. 147 in the US. During the subsequent tour, the band celebrated their tenth anniversary with a concert at the Palladium Theatre in New York City in May.

In April 1977, during the promotional tour for Something Magic, Copping joined Frankie Miller's band and was replaced in Procol Harum by Elton John's former bassist Dee Murray. The tour ended in May, and the following month Grabham announced that he had left the band, claiming that he had been "generally dissatisfied with my role ... for some months". The band played one final show in October when "A Whiter Shade of Pale" co-won the Single of the Year award at the 1977 Brit Awards, with Brooker, Wilson and returning members Cartwright and Copping joined by guitarist Tim Renwick.

=== Reformation in the 1990s ===
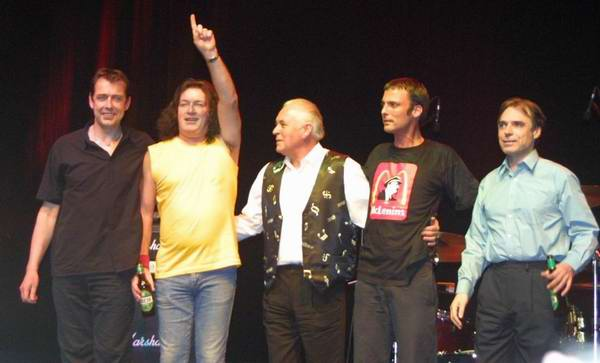
Procol Harum in 2001. L to R: Mark Brzezicki, Geoff Whitehorn, Brooker, Matt Pegg, Fisher.

After Reid and Brooker teamed up to write once again in late 1989, the band reformed in 1991, with Brooker, Fisher, Trower and Reid (Wilson had died in 1990 after three years in a persistent vegetative state following a drug overdose) and released The Prodigal Stranger, but sales were modest. After the album's release, a new incarnation of the band, with Brooker and Fisher but not Trower, toured the US and the world for a few years in the first half of the 1990s. Tim Renwick took over on guitar, with Dave Bronze on bass and Mark Brzezicki on drums. Renwick was replaced later in the year by Geoff Whitehorn.

After a tour which spawned One More Time: Live in Utrecht 1992, Fisher briefly stepped away from the band to focus on studying for a degree, with Don Snow temporarily taking over for a summer tour. Laurence Cottle substituted for Bronze, who was performing with the Hamsters, at a show in August.

After nearly a year of inactivity, Procol Harum performed a handful of shows in May and June 1993, with former Diamond Head keyboardist Josh Phillips filling in for Fisher and former King Crimson drummer Ian Wallace in place of Brzezicki, who had rejoined Big Country. Fisher returned for shows starting in July, and Matt Pegg replaced Bronze the following month. Touring continued sporadically throughout the rest of the decade – Graham Broad performed drums for a run of shows in July and August 1995, and Henry Spinetti took over for shows in 1996.

In August 1995 Procol Harum played at the Cropredy Music Festival, as guests of Fairport Convention. They also toured US and UK the same year, performing at several locations.

In July 1997 fans arranged the celebration of the 30th anniversary of the success of "A Whiter Shade of Pale" and invited the then-inactive band to play a concert at Redhill, Surrey. The band played a one-off show in celebration of the 30th anniversary of "A Whiter Shade of Pale", with the regular lineup joined on several songs by former members Mick Grabham, Peter Solley, Alan Cartwright, Dave Bronze and Chris Copping.

In late 1999, Brooker promised that "Procol will play in 2000", and in September the band played an open-air gig with the New London Sinfonia in Guildford.

=== 2000s ===
In 2000 Procol Harum received some attention after the song "In Held Twas in I" appeared on the band Transatlantic's debut album.

In the early 2000s, the band, comprising Brooker, Fisher, Geoff Whitehorn (guitar), Matt Pegg (bass) and Mark Brzezicki (drums), made several tours, mostly of Europe but also Japan and the US. A 2001 concert in Copenhagen, Denmark was released on DVD in 2002. In 2003 the band released a new studio album, The Well's on Fire and appeared at the Progman Cometh festival in Seattle. Their concert in London on Friday 12 December 2003, with much of the material from that album, was released on DVD in 2004: Live at the Union Chapel.

Long-time organist Matthew Fisher left the band in June 2004 due to "unresolved matters", with former stand-in Josh Phillips taking his place on Hammond again, leaving Brooker as the only original performing member. These matters were later revealed to have been a lawsuit filed by Fisher against Brooker and the band for songwriting credits and a share of royalties on "A Whiter Shade of Pale", which he won in December 2006.

The band resumed a limited touring schedule in 2005. In June 2006 they played at the Isle of Wight Festival. In August they played two outdoor concerts with the Danish Radio Orchestra at Ledreborg Castle in Denmark, which were tele-recorded. An hour-long edit of the show was broadcast on Christmas morning 2008 on Danish Channel DR2 and the full concert was issued on DVD on 11 May 2009 (with six extra tracks from a Danish television recording of the band from 1974).

Later in 2006, they played in Switzerland, Norway and Denmark, but with Geoff Dunn replacing Brzezicki on drums, because the latter's other band Casbah Club was touring with The Who. Then Dunn ended up replacing Brzezicki permanently for the band's European tour in 2007. Recordings from the Italian concerts were later released as One Eye to the Future – Live in Italy 2007. Procol Harum also played an orchestral concert in Sweden on 30 June. They performed with the Gävle Symphony Orchestra at the outdoor opera venue Dalhalla, near Rättvik.

On 20 and 21 July 2007 fans arranged the celebration of the 40th anniversary of the success of "A Whiter Shade of Pale" and invited the band to play. This took the form of two concerts at St John's, Smith Square in London. 20 July saw Procol Harum play a mixture of songs from their early days through to the début of a couple of new songs, "Sister Mary" and "Missing Persons". The following night 'Gary Brooker and Guests' performed a mixture of obscure songs by Brooker–Reid that had either never been recorded, never been performed live before or were significantly different from the versions they recorded.

Although there was no Procol Harum activity in 2008, their manager Chris Cooke, on the web site Beyond the Pale, announced plans for a live DVD and a new album in 2009, as well as festival concerts in Norway on 17 July and Finland on 23 July. Just before the latter concert, Brooker fell off a pile of road-side logs in Finland and broke several ribs. The show went ahead but he was unable to sing properly, and many of the songs were performed either as instrumentals or sung by others in the band.

In October 2009 with Brooker fully recovered, the band performed four concerts – in Hagen (Germany), Drammen (Norway), Moscow and St Petersburg. All This and More, a four-disc retrospective (three CDs and a DVD with historical notes) was released in the autumn of 2009, and Salvo also issued all of the band's previous albums as remastered CDs with extra tracks, some never previously heard.

=== 2010s ===
Procol played a string of US (and Toronto) concert dates in June 2010, mostly opening for Jethro Tull. On 22 July Procol again headlined at the Keitelejazz Festival in Äänekoski, Finland – the venue where the band performed with an injured Brooker in 2009. They described this loyal Finnish audience as "the best in the world" and played a unique three-verse version of "A Whiter Shade of Pale" with a guitar solo from Geoff Whitehorn. 48 hours later Procol were invited to give a free concert at the courtyard of the Palace of the Province of Bergamo in Italy.

In August 2010 they appeared in Bad Krozingen in Germany and a Rock Legends event at the Dolina Charlotty Amphitheater in Poland. After a Halloween gig in Leamington Spa (their first in the UK for three years) the band returned to North America in November, including a return orchestral event with the Edmonton Symphony Orchestra on 9 November. After playing in Tallinn, Estonia on 18 November, they returned to the US for an orchestral concert in Wilmington, Delaware on 4 December. Over 13,000 people saw eight New Year concerts with the Danish Radio Orchestra in Copenhagen and other Danish cities in January 2011.

On 29 May 2012 Gary Brooker was hospitalised after suffering a fall in his hotel room in Cape Town. He was due to have performed with his band at GrandWest Arena on the 30th, with fellow Brits 10cc and The Moody Blues, in a tour billed as the 'British Invasion' and then again in Johannesburg on Friday 1 June 2012. Brooker (whose birthday it was) had been in his room at the five-star Table Bay Hotel. He was admitted to the ICU of the Christiaan Barnard Memorial Hospital with a serious skull fracture.

The band returned to Denmark for the Kløften Festival on 25 June before embarking on a 27-date U.S. tour supporting Yes.

In 2012 the Japanese artist Yumi Matsutoya came to London to record "A Whiter Shade of Pale" with Procol Harum, a band she considered an inspiration for her work. She sang a duet with Gary Brooker on this new version of the 1967 classic, which featured three verses and a guitar solo by Geoff Whitehorn. Yumi and Procol Harum then played a series of December concerts in major Japanese cities, one of which was recorded for a later television showing (on 31 March 2013).

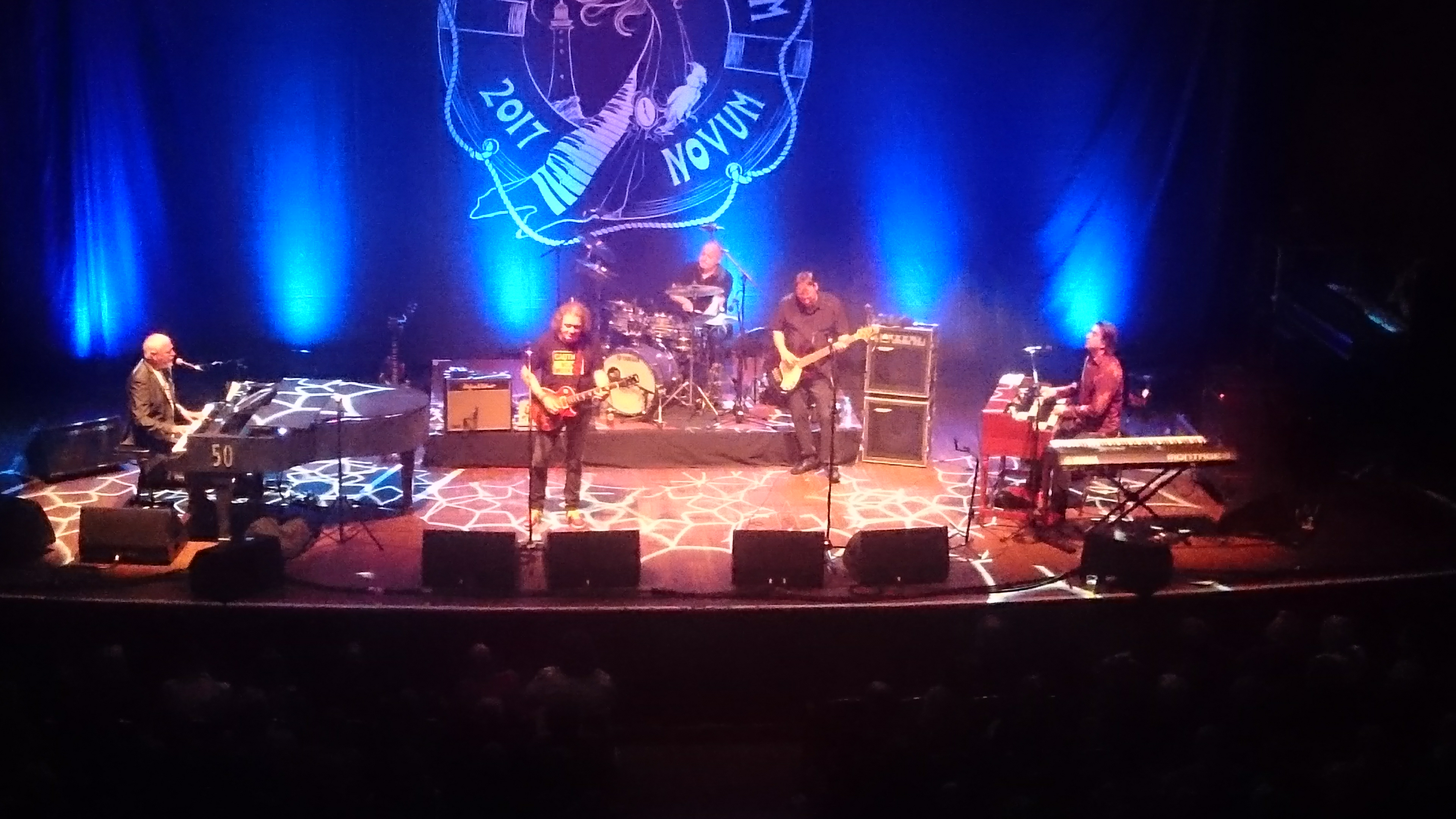
Procol Harum performing at the Colston Hall, Bristol, 16 May 2017

Also in 2012, Henry Scott-Irvine published a biography of the band, Procol Harum – The Ghosts of A Whiter Shade of Pale. Scott-Irvine also hosted a rare Procol Harum film evening at the BFI on the South Bank, which was attended by members of the group.

In September 2012 Procol Harum was among fifteen final nominees for the Rock and Roll Hall of Fame Class of 2013 (induction 18 April 2013). In the subsequent election that December, however, the band failed to gain enough votes for election.

In March and April 2013 Procol Harum played a series of five orchestral concerts in Denmark and two such events in Wuppertal in Germany. Four band-only concerts in Sweden & Finland were held in early October.

In 2014 the band toured again in France, Switzerland, Germany, Canada (Ottawa with orchestra) and the Eastern U.S. The band also played a five-song set at Kenney Jones' Rock'n'Horsepower charity event at Ewhurst, Surrey in June, on a bill including Alvin Stardust, John Lodge, Nik Kershaw, Mike Rutherford, Judie Tzuke and The Who. A twin CD, Inside & Outside, was issued with studio tracks from the Chrysalis years and a live CD including new material and performances of tracks from their first four Zonophone albums.

On Monday 24 November Procol Harum appeared at the Dominion Theatre in London with the BBC Concert Orchestra and Crouch End Festival Chorus in an event recorded for broadcast on BBC Radio 2's Friday Night is Music Night on 28 November. Guitarist Geoff Whitehorn was hospitalised during rehearsals and at short notice Rick Wakeman's guitarist Dave Colquhoun deputised (on crutches, after a broken ankle). He played a guitar solo in the first extended, orchestrated version of Keith Reid's 9/11 tribute song "Blink of an Eye", dedicated by Gary Brooker to the brave firefighters of the 8th Avenue station who the band often talked with after gigs in New York.

The band's 13th album, Novum, was released on 21 April 2017 and the band played 36 dates in the UK and Europe to promote it. However, the most significant concert of the year came in March when the band played with an orchestra at the Royal Festival Hall in London. Whilst leaving the stage at the end of the first half, Gary Brooker fell and was seriously hurt. He reappeared for the second half with his head bandaged and nursing "a broken hand".

In 2018 the band again toured in Europe, including an orchestral show at the London Palladium on 9 October. They commenced 2019 with a Caribbean cruise hosted by Justin Hayward, with many well-known rock acts. A US tour was due to follow.

=== Brooker's death ===
Brooker, the only constant member of the band and the main songwriter, died on 19 February 2022. The band's website described him as "a brightly shining, irreplaceable light in the music industry". "A Whiter Shade of Pale" entered the UK Official Singles Sales Chart Top 100 at number 38 on 25 February 2022. After his death, Procol Harum disbanded for good.

Keith Reid died on 23 March 2023, aged 76. David Knights died on 26 June 2026, two days before his 81st birthday.

== Authorship lawsuit ==
In July 2009, organist Matthew Fisher won a British court judgment awarding him 40% of the music royalties from 2005 onwards for 1967's "A Whiter Shade of Pale", which had previously gone 50% to Brooker for the music and 50% to Reid for the lyrics.

== Discography ==
Studio and contemporary live albums

- Procol Harum (1967)
- Shine on Brightly (1968)
- A Salty Dog (1969)
- Home (1970)
- Broken Barricades (1971)
- Procol Harum Live: In Concert with the Edmonton Symphony Orchestra (1972)
- Grand Hotel (1973)
- Exotic Birds and Fruit (1974)
- Procol's Ninth (1975)
- Something Magic (1977)
- The Prodigal Stranger (1991)
- The Well's on Fire (2003)
- Live at the Union Chapel (2004)
- In Concert with the Danish National Concert Orchestra and Choir (2009)
- Novum (2017)
