= Matt Pegg =

British bassist (born 1971)

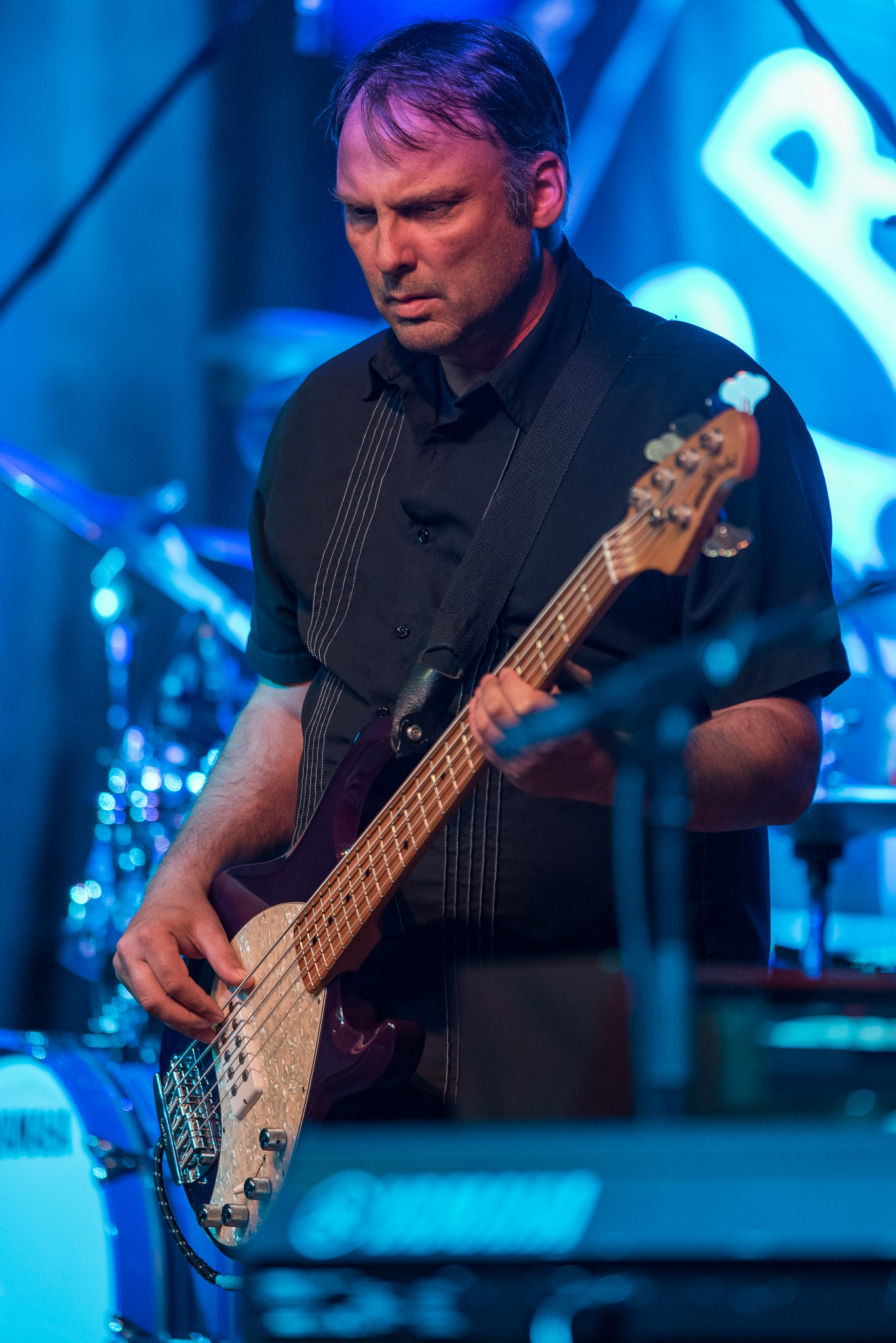
Pegg in 2018

Matthew Pegg (born 27 March 1971) is an English bass guitarist.

Pegg is the son of Fairport Convention and Jethro Tull bass guitar player Dave Pegg. He is an experienced bass guitarist in his own right and has been known to stand in for his father on Jethro Tull and Fairport Convention tours. He has recorded with Francis Dunnery, Ian Brown and Chris Difford.

Pegg began his professional career in 1989, aged 18, with the band Blinder who played in a contemporary progressive rock style. Blinder played two very successful support slots with the band It Bites, which brought Pegg to the attention of future employer Francis Dunnery. (The other members of Blinder would later form the band Headswim - who signed to Polydor Records - and BlackCar.)

Pegg appeared on Dunnery's Man album in 2001, and toured with him on his Hometown tour (as well as appearing on the Hometown (Live) album of the following year). Since 1993, he has been a member of the group Procol Harum; touring with them regularly and appearing on their The Well's on Fire and Novum albums and Live at the Union Chapel and Procol Harum – In Concert with the Danish National Concert Orchestra and Choir DVDs.

He tours with folk-rock group "The Gathering".
