= Josh Phillips (musician) =

English musician

Josh Philips
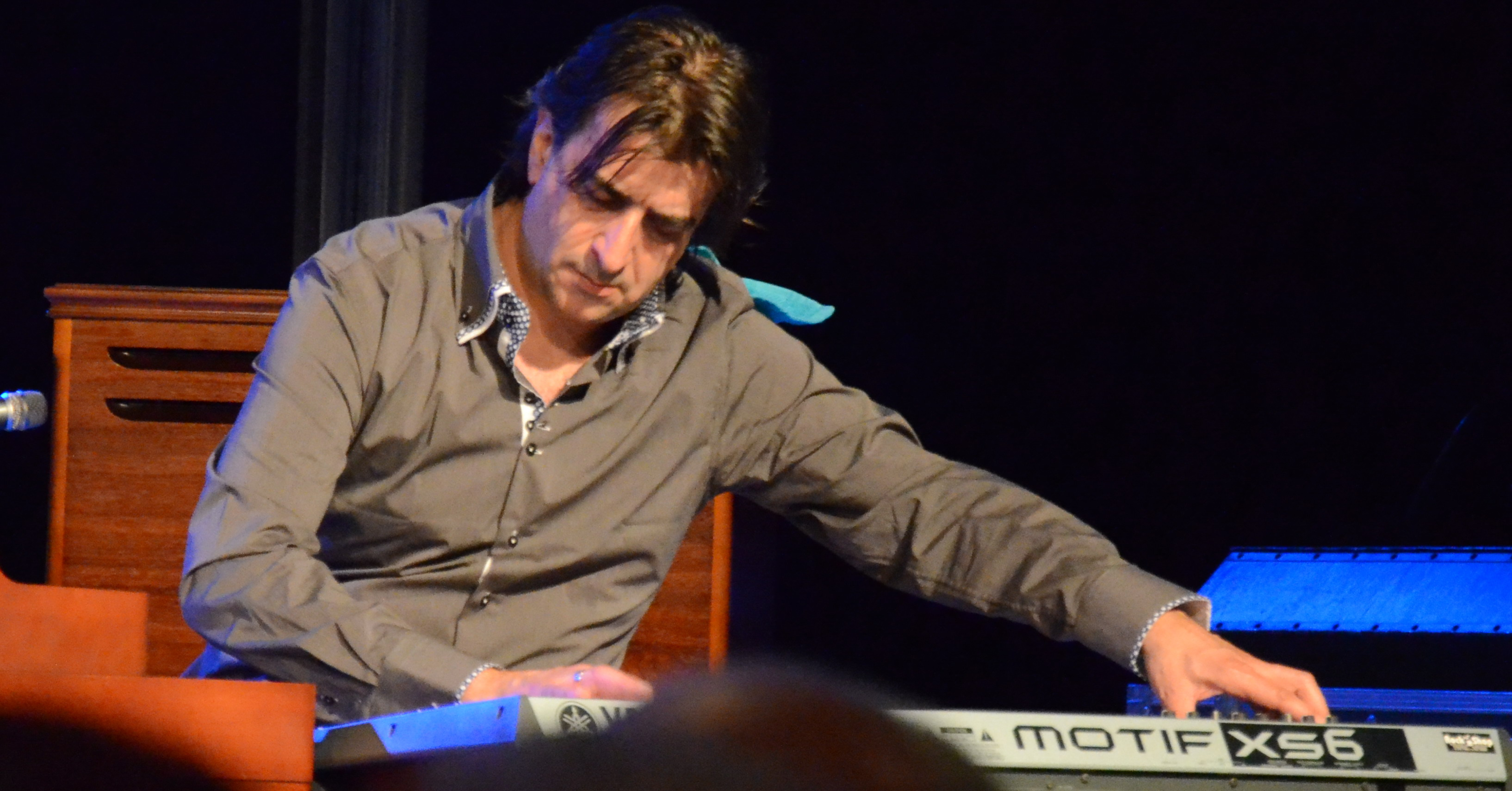
- Josh Phillips playing the Yamaha Motif XS6 with Procol Harum at Freising, 29 May 2014.

Background information
- Also known as: Jonathan Phillips-Gorse
- Born: 19 December 1962 (age 63); Rochester, Kent, England
- Genres: Rock; progressive rock; film score
- Occupations: Musician; composer
- Instrument: Keyboards
- Years active: 1979–present
- Member of: The Blue Water Giants
- Formerly of: Procol Harum; David Cross Band; Diamond Head; Spitzbrook; Casbah Club

Josh Phillips (born 19 December 1962, Rochester, Kent, England) is a rock keyboardist and composer. He first played Hammond organ with Procol Harum in 1993 and was the band's organist from 2004 until they disbanded in 2022, both times replacing the bands original organist Matthew Fisher.

He began his career at sixteen playing organ on the soundtrack to Quadrophenia, and he later appeared in the film with his band Cross Section. From 1983 to 1984 he was the keyboardist for Diamond Head. He has written for and/or performed with a wide range of musicians, including Big Country, Leo Sayer, Pete Townshend, The Crazy World of Arthur Brown, Kenney Jones, Starlite Campbell Band, Ronan Keating, Alisha's Attic, Heatwave, Midge Ure, The Company Of Snakes, Eric Clapton and Paul McCartney.

In 2024 he formed a band, The Blue Water Giants, with Neil Taylor and John Edwards. The band plays "nothing but proven hit songs to which — either on stage or on the original records — at least one of its members has contributed".

Along with Dan McGrath he has composed title themes and incidental music for many TV shows including Strictly Come Dancing and Take Me Out. For the US version of "Strictly Come Dancing", "Dancing with the Stars", they have received numerous ASCAP Awards. He also has songwriting credits on Procol Harum's 2017 album Novum. He is the co-writer of "Suburban House" with Andrew Brel, recorded by Leo Sayer.

He is also known as Josh/Jonathan Phillips-Gorse, and has many album credits under that name from the 1980s.
