= Mick Grabham =

British musician (born 1948)

Mick Grabham in 1973.

Mick Grabham (born Michael Grabham, 22 January 1948, Sunderland, County Durham, England) is an English rock guitarist. He played lead guitar for Procol Harum after the departure of Dave Ball, beginning with their album, Grand Hotel (1973) through to Something Magic (1977). He later played with Procol Harum at their 30 year reunion party at Redhill, Surrey in 1997, and at their Millennium Concert at Guildford, with the New London Symphonia, in 2000.

He also played a version of "The Wedding March" on the soundtrack of the movie, The Rocky Horror Picture Show, along with his Procol Harum bandmate, drummer B.J. Wilson.

In the late 1960s, Grabham (then billed as Mick Graham) was a guitar playing member of Plastic Penny. They had a number six charting song in 1968 with “Everything I Am”.
