= Novum (album) =

Studio album by Procol Harum
- Released: 21 April 2017
- Recorded: October – December 2016
- Genre: Progressive rock; art rock; blues rock; hard rock
- Length: 56:04
- Label: Eagle Rock Entertainment
- Producer: Dennis Weinreich

Procol Harum chronology
The Well's on Fire (2003)	Novum (2017)

Professional ratings
Aggregate scores
Source	Rating
Metacritic	69/100
Review scores
Source	Rating
Allmusic	3.5/5 stars
TeamRock	3.5/5 stars
The Spill Magazine	4/5 stars

Novum is the twelfth and final studio album by Procol Harum, released on 21 April 2017. It is their first album in 14 years, and their only one not to feature lyrics by Keith Reid.

== Track listing ==
Music by Gary Brooker and Josh Phillips, except where noted. Lyrics by Pete Brown, except where noted.

1. "I Told On You" – 5:33
2. "Last Chance Motel" – 4:48
3. "Image of the Beast" (music: Brooker, Philips, Geoff Whitehorn) – 4:56
4. "Soldier" (lyrics: Brooker) – 5:28
5. "Don't Get Caught" – 5:12
6. "Neighbour" – 2:46
7. "Sunday Morning" – 5:28
8. "Businessman" – 4:45
9. "Can't Say That" – 7:13
10. "The Only One" – 6:10
11. "Somewhen" (music and lyrics: Brooker) – 3:47

== Personnel ==
- Gary Brooker – piano, accordion, vocals
- Josh Phillips – organ, vocals
- Geoff Whitehorn – guitar
- Matt Pegg – bass guitar
- Geoff Dunn – drums
- Pete Brown – lyrics
- Dennis Weinreich – producer

== Charts ==
Chart (2017)	Peak position
German Albums (Offizielle Top 100)	82
Swiss Albums (Schweizer Hitparade)	81
UK Rock & Metal Albums (OCC)	6
