= Chris Copping =

British musician

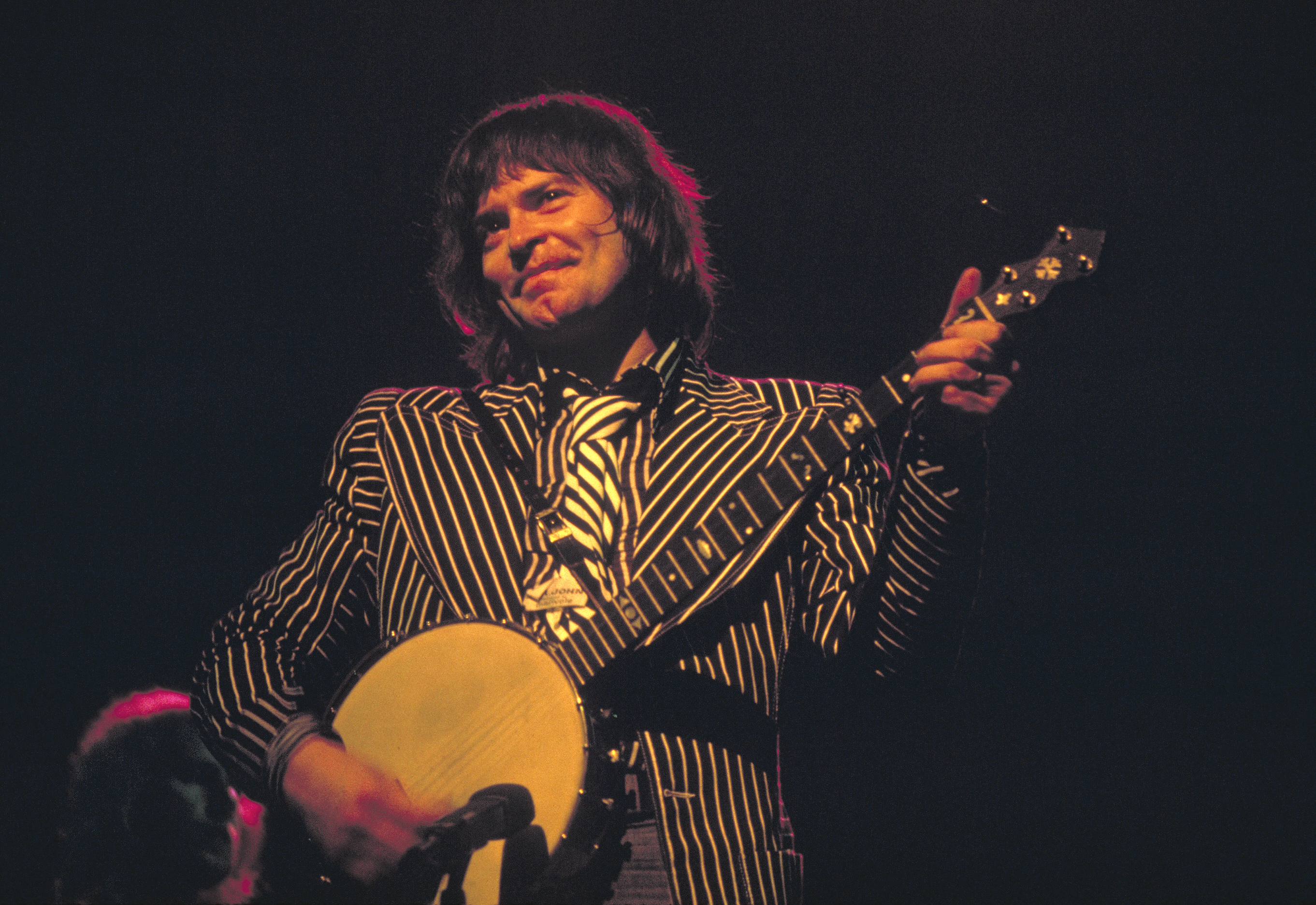
Chris Copping in 1975

Chris Copping (born 29 August 1945 in Middleton, Lancashire, England) is a musician and singer-songwriter who was a member of Procol Harum in the 1970s, and has also composed for TV and film. He predominantly plays organ, piano and bass guitar.

== Career ==
In 1960 he joined a group called The Paramounts as a guitarist but left in December 1962 to go to study chemistry at Leicester University. Diz Derrick replaced him in the group until they split up in October 1966.

From 1963 until 1966 he studied at Leicester University, receiving an honours degree in chemistry. From 1966 to 1969, he worked for the government and studied for a PhD. During this time his first marriage had broken up and he had returned to playing music, initially playing the organ in a pub, then playing traditional German music. In 1969, he was invited by Robin Trower to replace Matthew Fisher on organ and David Knights on bass in Procol Harum (at which point that band consisted entirely of ex-The Paramounts musicians).

Between December 1969 and March 1977 Copping recorded seven albums with the group and toured extensively. During this time Copping alternated between bass guitar and Hammond organ as other musicians joined the group. After recording the album, Something Magic, he left the group and was replaced by Dee Murray for the accompanying tour, after which the group broke up.

In 1978 he moved to Australia where he continues to play and compose. In recent years Copping has worked with artists such as Mark Hilton, JoJo Leslie and Astrid Munday, as well as composing music for a number of short films (Miss Fortune, The Web and Slim Pickings).
