= B. J. Wilson =

English drummer

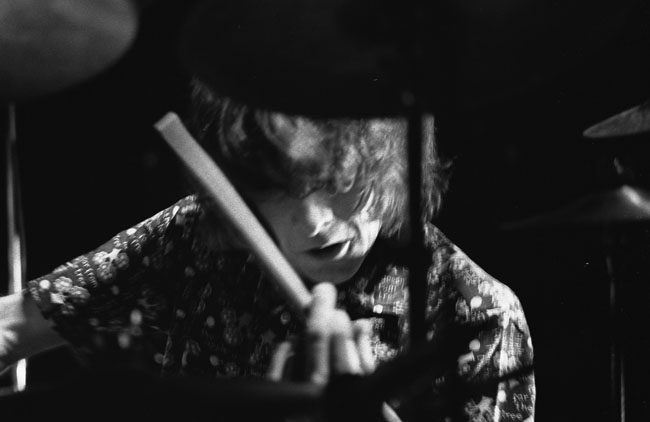

Background information
- Born: Barrie James Wilson; 18 March 1947; Edmonton, England
- Died: 8 October 1990 (aged 43) Eugene, Oregon, United States
- Genres: Rock, Progressive rock, Psychedelic rock, Baroque rock
- Occupation: Musician
- Instrument: Drums
- Years active: 1962–1987
- Formerly of: Procol Harum; The Paramounts

Barrie James "B. J." Wilson (18 March 1947 – 8 October 1990) was an English rock drummer. He was best known as a member of Procol Harum for the majority of their original career from 1967 to 1977.

== Career ==
=== Early career ===
Wilson was born in Edmonton, Middlesex, and grew up in Ponders End. In 1962 he joined the Southend on Sea group The Paramounts, who scored a hit with "Poison Ivy" in 1964. After follow up singles failed to chart, the group disbanded in 1966 and Wilson went into session drumming, playing with Cat Stevens and Lulu.

=== Procol Harum ===
While he was busy with session drumming, former bandmate Gary Brooker had put together a new band, Procol Harum, and despite having a huge hit with "A Whiter Shade of Pale" (which featured jazz session drummer Bill Eyden) had difficulty getting a stable band for recording follow-up material. Eventually, Wilson joined Procol Harum in the summer of 1967, along with fellow ex-Paramount Robin Trower.

There is some confusion over exactly what Wilson's contributions were to Procol Harum's follow‑up single "Homburg". It is commonly believed that he played all the drums on the track, but according to both Wilson himself and organist Matthew Fisher, he was presented with a half-completed drum track onto which he subsequently overdubbed a few drum rolls. Whatever the case, he had established himself as the full-time drummer for the group's debut album. Although he lacked the name recognition as other great drummers of his generation, Wilson was voted Best Drummer in the popular Playboy Music Polls of the early 1970s. He declined an offer by Jimmy Page and Robert Plant to be the original drummer for Led Zeppelin, so John Bonham got that gig instead.

=== Later career ===
After Procol Harum disbanded in 1977, Wilson played on Frankie Miller's Double Trouble album in 1978, and was a member of Joe Cocker's touring band between 1979 and 1984. Their concert in Calgary is featured on the DVD Joe Cocker Live (1981) and he is also featured in two Berlin concerts on the 2008 Joe Cocker DVD Cry Me A River (The Rockpalast Collection). B.J. had been the drummer on Cocker's hit single, "With a Little Help from My Friends", recorded in 1968. In 1984, Wilson played briefly with Patrick Landreville, a former member of the 1960s cult band RHS, which included bandmates Bob Siebenberg (Supertramp), Scott Gorham (Thin Lizzy) and John Boutell (Beauregard Ajax). In 1983, he was brought in to play drums on AC/DC's Flick of the Switch album, after their drummer Phil Rudd left the band close to the end of the recording for the album. No tracks recorded by Wilson were used on the finished album according to the recording engineer and he was soon after replaced by drummer Simon Wright.

Wilson was the drummer on the film soundtrack of The Rocky Horror Picture Show (1975), on which his former Procol Harum bandmate, guitarist Mick Grabham, also played. According to IMDb, Wilson's friend, prominent film composer, Richard Hartley, was the one who invited him to drum on that soundtrack, and Wilson brought Grabham in to play guitar. B.J. also played on two tracks ("Lady Day" & "The Kids") on Lou Reed's 1973 album "Berlin".

Wilson's last recorded work was on the 1985 Gary Brooker solo album, Echoes in the Night, along with his former Procol Harum bandmates Keith Reid and Matthew Fisher, on tracks "Ghost Train", "The Long Goodbye" "Hear What You're Saying" and "Mr. Blue Day".

== Death ==
In 1987, Wilson collapsed after an intentional drug overdose and was hospitalised for three years, remaining in a vegetative state. Brooker and Reid had reformed the band and hoped to aid his recovery by sending "him the demo tapes we were making with a horrible drum machine on it because he hated that sort of thing". Unfortunately Wilson had 'suffered catastrophic damage which was never going to right itself'. He died of pneumonia in Eugene, Oregon, United States, at the age of 43. He was survived by his wife, Susan, and two daughters, Sarah and Nicola.

== Style ==
Wilson was the only stable member of Procol Harum besides vocalist / pianist Gary Brooker and lyricist Keith Reid during their commercial and artistic peak from 1967 to 1977. He had a powerful, distinctive style – he sat very low behind his kit (often side-on at the side of the stage) and was once referred to as like an 'Octopus in a Bathtub'. Live performances of the song "Power Failure", a track written to showcase his talents on the album Broken Barricades (1971), were filmed on a number of occasions.
