= Keith Reid =

English lyricist and songwriter (1946–2023)

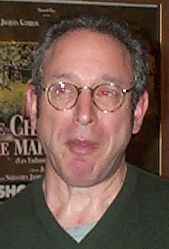
- Reid in 1999

Background information
- Born: Keith Stuart Brian Reid; 19 October 1946; Welwyn Garden City, Hertfordshire, England
- Died: 23 March 2023 (aged 76) London, England
- Genres: Psychedelic rock, progressive rock, Art rock
- Occupations: Lyricist, songwriter
- Years active: 1966–2023
- Formerly of: Procol Harum

Keith Stuart Brian Reid (19 October 1946 – 23 March 2023) was an English lyricist and songwriter.

He was best known for writing the lyric of every original song released by Procol Harum, with the exception of the songs on their 2017 album, Novum. He co-founded the band with Gary Brooker. Reid was a non-performing member; he did not play any instrument or record with Procol Harum. After the band's break-up in 1977, he continued to write songs. Most notably, he co-wrote "You're the Voice", a UK top-10 hit for Australian singer John Farnham.

== Biography ==
=== Early life ===
Reid was born on 19 October 1946. He grew up in London and was Jewish, the son of a Holocaust survivor. He left school at an early age to pursue a songwriting career.

=== Procol Harum ===
He met Gary Brooker, lead singer with Procol Harum, with whom he co-wrote most of the band's songs (some music was written by organist Matthew Fisher and by guitarist Robin Trower), in 1966. They began collaborating, and their song "A Whiter Shade of Pale", Procol Harum's first single, was released in 1967. It reached the top of the UK Singles Chart and sold over six million copies worldwide. Keith Reid was an official member of Procol Harum and attended all their recording sessions and most of their concert performances, despite having no performance role in the band. Reid continued to write lyrics for the band until they disbanded in 1977. Reid has said that the dark tone of his lyric writing derives from his familial experience of the Holocaust.

He reunited with Brooker and Procol Harum for the albums The Prodigal Stranger (1991) and The Well's on Fire (2003).

=== Other works ===
Reid also wrote the lyrics for two songs by the French singer Michel Polnareff in 1966 ("You'll Be On My Mind" and "Time Will Tell"), and was co-writer for the John Farnham hit "You're the Voice" (1986).

Reid moved to New York and founded a management company in 1986.

In August 2008, a new album, The Common Thread, was issued under The Keith Reid Project banner. Reid wrote the lyrics for the songs, which were performed by a variety of musicians, including Southside Johnny, Chris Thompson, John Waite and Michael Saxell. The album was produced by Keith Reid and Matt Noble.

A new album from the Keith Reid Project, In My Head, was released in December 2018.

=== Death ===
Reid died from colon cancer on 23 March 2023, at the age of 76.

== Songwriting credits ==
=== Michel Polnareff ===
- You'll Be On My Mind (1966)
- Time Will Tell (1966)

=== John Farnham ===
- You're the Voice (1986)
