= Hepner =

Hepner is a surname. Notable people with the surname include:

- Adolf Hepner (1846–1923), German-American writer
- Darcy Hepner (born 1954), Canadian-American saxophonist
- Fred Hepner (born 1940), Australian footballer
- Jean Hepner (born 1958), American tennis player
- Lee Hepner (1920–1986), Canadian orchestral conductor
- Linda Hepner (born 1949), Canadian politician
- Rachel Dübendorfer (née Hepner, 1900–1973), anti-Nazi resistance fighter
- Urmas Hepner (born 1964), Estonian footballer

== See also ==
- Hepner Hall
- Hepner-Bailey Field at Adamson Stadium
- Heppner (disambiguation)
