= William Eddins =

American pianist and conductor

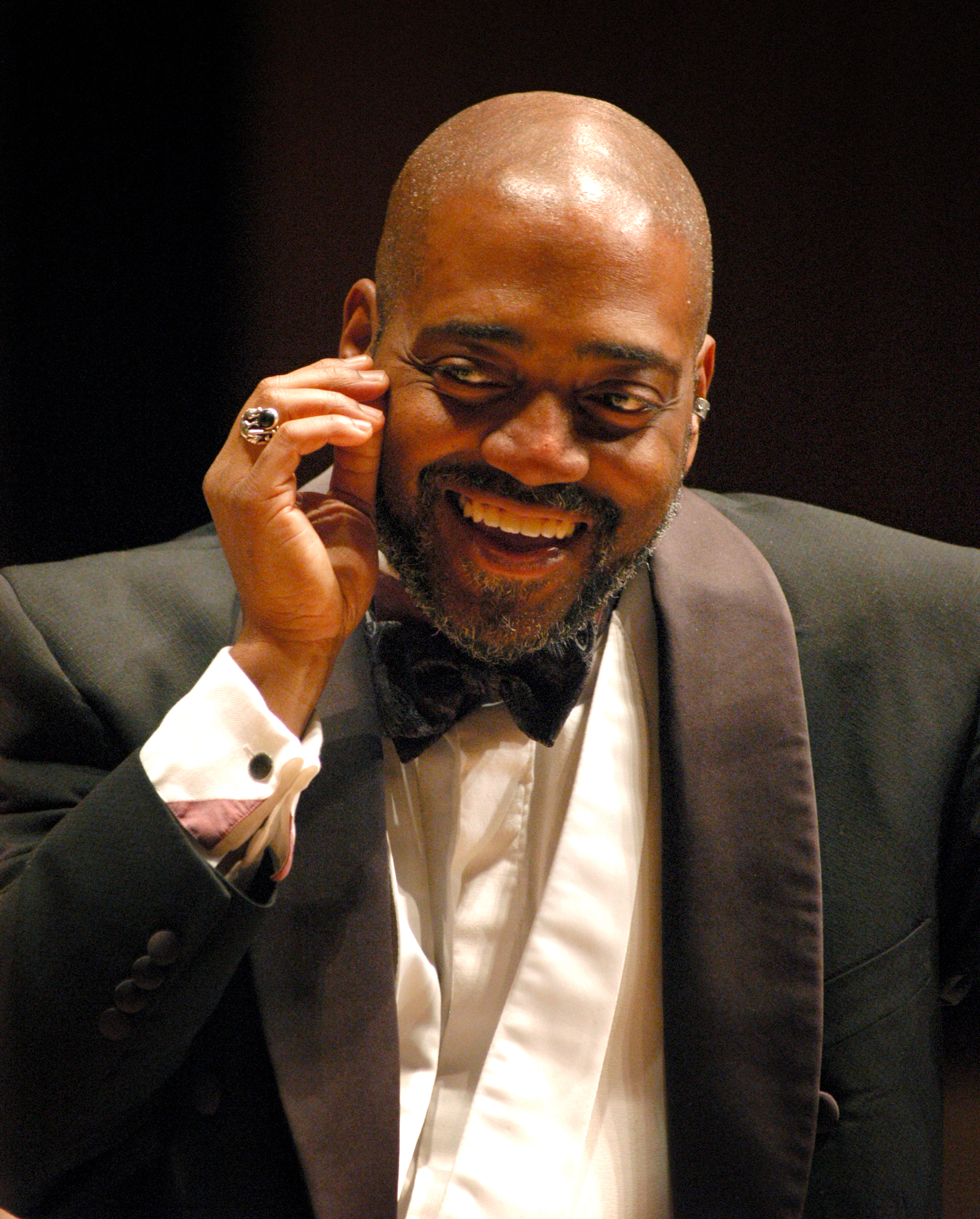
William Eddins

William Eddins (born December 9, 1964, Buffalo, New York) is an American pianist and conductor. He served as music director of the Edmonton Symphony Orchestra from 2005 until 2017.

Eddins started playing piano at age 5 after his parents purchased a piano at a garage sale. He studied with David Effron at the Eastman School of Music in Rochester, New York. He completed his degree in piano performance in 1983 at age 18, one of the youngest graduates in the institution's history. He later studied conducting with Daniel Lewis at the USC Thornton School of Music. In 1987, he was a founding member of the New World Symphony Orchestra in Miami, Florida.

Eddins has served as Associate Conductor of the Minnesota Orchestra, Resident Conductor of the Chicago Symphony Orchestra, Principal Guest Conductor of the RTÉ National Symphony Orchestra, and assistant to Daniel Barenboim at the Berlin State Opera. In 2000, Eddins received the Seaver Conducting Award (funded by the Seaver Institute and the National Endowment for the Arts), a triennial grant awarded to exceptionally gifted young American conductors.

As a conductor, Eddins is eclectic in his preferences. A classicist in his approach to the music of Haydn, Mozart and Beethoven, he usually favors North American repertoire in his programming. Music by Bernstein, Copland, Gershwin, and Antheil figure prominently in his performances. He is fascinated with the music of Lili Boulanger. Eddins has collaborated with such contemporary composers as Steve Reich, Steven Stucky, Wynton Marsalis, Oskar Morawetz, Malcolm Forsyth, Allan Gilliland, John Estacio, and Aaron Jay Kernis.

As pianist, Eddins has recorded solo piano works by Beethoven, Debussy and William Albright on his own CD label. He has recorded cello concertos by Virgil Thomson, William Schuman and William Perry for Naxos Records. An avid chamber musician, he also conducts works by Mozart, Beethoven, Gershwin, Poulenc, Franck, Fauré and Ravel from the piano. He produces and hosts podcasts (Classical Connections) which are dedicated to exploring classical music history.

Eddins is married to Jennifer Gerth of over twenty years, an established clarinetist and college instructor, and has two sons named Raef and Riley, who is a tenor for the English acapella group, Voces8.

Cultural offices
Preceded by Grzegorz Nowak	Music Directors, Edmonton Symphony Orchestra; 2005-2017	Succeeded by Alexander Prior
