= Richard Eaton Singers =

Symphonic chorus in Edmonton, Alberta

- Choir
- Origin: Edmonton, Alberta, Canada
- Founded: 1951
- Founder: Richard Eaton
- Chief conductor: Timothy Shantz
- Website: richardeatonsingers.com

Richard Eaton Singers is a symphonic chorus in Edmonton, Alberta, Canada which has played a leading role in the cultural community of the city for over seven decades. Richard Eaton Singers (RES) is dedicated to the enjoyment, study and performance of great choral music to an international standard of excellence, and to fostering the appreciation and future of this musical genre. Often partnering with the Edmonton Symphony Orchestra, RES has created many choral events in the city, including the performance of Mahler's Symphony of a Thousand to celebrate the opening of the Francis Winspear Centre for Music. RES has commissioned and produced premiere performances by Canadian composers, including John Estacio, Allan Bevan, Stephanie Martin, Imant Raminsh, and Mark Sirett, as well as participated in several ESO premiers of Canadian works, including Malcolm Forsyth's A Ballad of Canada. RES has toured extensively across Canada, the Netherlands, Britain and Germany, and has participated in choir exchanges, including with the Calgary Philharmonic Choir and Vancouver Bach Choir. RES also regularly performs with other Edmonton area choirs, most recently with Kappella Kyrie in a concert in June 2023 as a fundraiser for assistance to Ukrainian refugee families who have relocated to Edmonton.

== History ==
The University Singers chorus was founded in 1951 by Richard Eaton, the first Chair of the Department of Music at the University of Alberta. In 1969, after Eaton's death, the choir voted to rename the group after its founder.

Richard Eaton conducted the Chorus until 1967, and was succeeded by Alexandra Munn (1967–1973), Larry Cook (1973–1981), and Leonard Ratzlaff (1981–2022), all U of A faculty members.

The choir has completed a number of tours in Canada; in 1970 the choir performed several concerts in England, and in 1987 they traveled to The Hague.

In the 1980s, the RES conducted evening concerts at Edmonton's All Saints Cathedral.

In June 2025 Richard Eaton Singers changed their name to Chorus Inspira.

The choir is currently conducted by Timothy Shantz, department head of Choral Conducting at the University of Alberta (2021).
