= Allan Gilliland =

Canadian composer (born 1965)

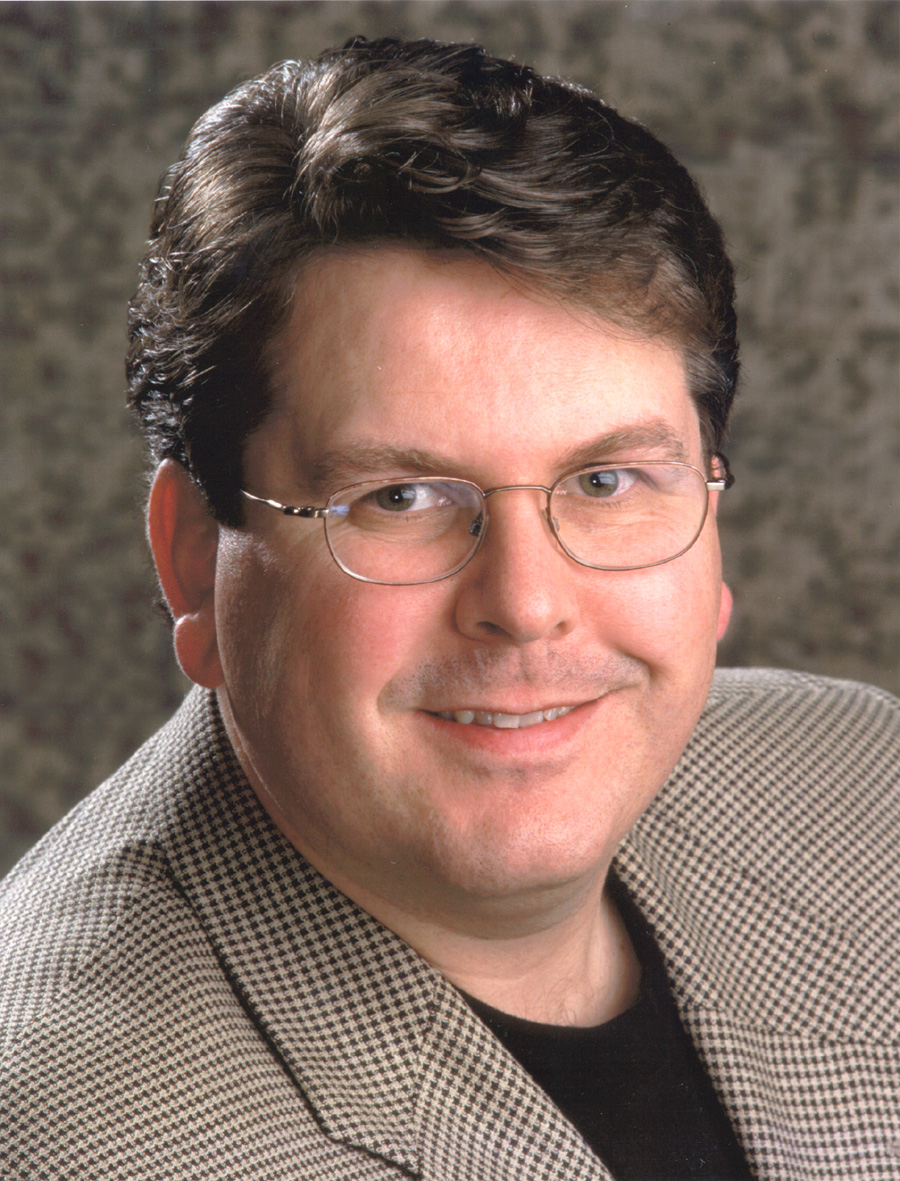
- Born: 1965 (age 60–61); Darvel, Scotland
- Occupation: composer

Allan Gilliland (born 1965 in Darvel, Scotland) is a contemporary Canadian composer.

Gilliland moved to Canada in 1972 and settled in Edmonton, Alberta. He received a diploma in Jazz Studies (trumpet) from Humber College, and degrees in performance and composition from the University of Alberta. His teachers were Violet Archer, Malcolm Forsyth and Howard Bashaw.

He has written music for solo instruments, orchestra, chorus, brass quintet, wind ensemble, big band, film, television and theatre.

His works have been performed by the Vancouver Symphony Orchestra, ProCoro Canada, the Canadian Brass, the Winnipeg Symphony Orchestra, the New York Pops, the Hammerhead Consort, and the brass section of the New York Philharmonic.

From 1999 to 2004, Gilliland was Composer in Residence with the Edmonton Symphony Orchestra, composing nine major works, including concerti for violin, and two harps. Dreaming of the Masters I (2003), a jazz concerto written for clarinet soloist James Campbell, is perhaps his most popular work, and received its American premiere by the Boston Pops in 2004.

Dreaming of the Masters II - GEB, a jazz rhapsody for piano and orchestra written for William Eddins and jointly commissioned by CBC and the Edmonton Symphony Orchestra, received its world premiere on February 22, 2008. Dreaming of the Masters III, a three-movement jazz suite for trumpet and orchestra written for Jens Lindemann and commissioned by the Edmonton Symphony Orchestra with funding from the Alberta Foundation for the Arts received its world premiere on September 17, 2010. His orchestral work On the Shoulders of Giants won first prize at the Winnipeg Symphony Orchestra's Composers Competition in 2002.

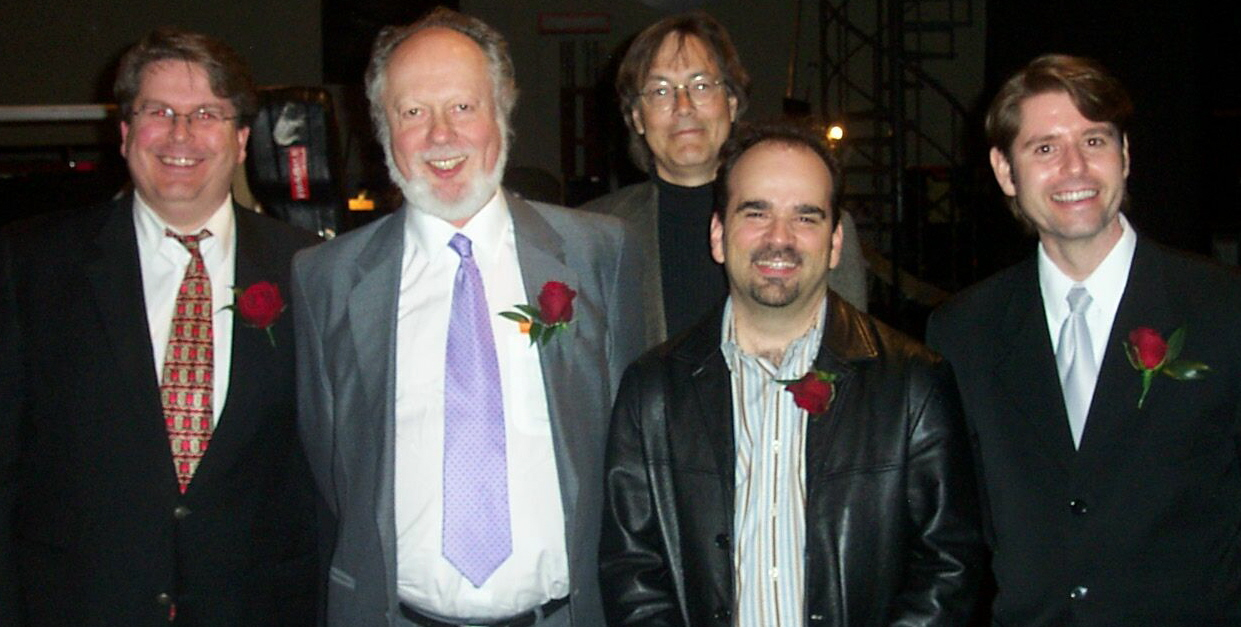
Composers Allan Gilliland, Malcolm Forsyth, Allan Gordon Bell, John Estacio, and Jeffrey McCune following the Edmonton Symphony Orchestra's performance of their music in April 2005

In 2007, the Alberta-based Arktos Recordings Limited label released Collaborations, a CD devoted exclusively to Gilliland's music. The track listing is:

1. The Winspear Fanfare
2. M'bira
3. Suite from the Sound
4. Cancion
5. Love's Red Rose
6. Four by Four
7. Roots
8. Concerto for Oboe, Strings and Harpsichord

Gilliland is currently Chair of the Music Program and Head of the Composition Department at MacEwan University in Edmonton.

== Works ==
Chamber music

- Suite from the Sound (clarinet and string quartet) (2005)
- Go Deeply Now Everlasting (piccolo trumpet and string quartet) (2004)
- Love's Red Rose (two harps) (2003)
- Adventures (clarinet, cello and piano) (2002)
- Sacred Time (2000)
- Basse Danse (bass trombone and tuba) (1999)
- Roots (solo 6-string electric bass) (1999)
- M'bira (solo marimba) (1998)
- Reflections of Infinity (piano, percussion, and string quartet) (1996)
- Four by Four (two pianos and two percussionists) (1994)
- Two Wheels for Four Percussion (four percussionists) (1993)

Fanfares

- Early Mornin' Fanfare (brass and percussion) (2001)
- Enbridge Fanfare (brass and percussion) (2001)
- A Call to Your Seats (brass and percussion) (2000)
- The Winspear Fanfare (brass and percussion) (1997)

Jazz Band

- A Touch of Olive and Brown
- Abanico
- Another Softly
- Petits Oiseaux
- Rhythm Buddy
- Stranger on the Prairie

Keyboard

- Spring Celebration (organ) (2005)
- Cancion (piano) (1999)

Musical Theatre

- The 7th Circle (2001)
- Dead Beat: A Zombie Musical (2003)

Opera

- Hannaraptor (2007)

Orchestra

- Fantasia on themes from West Side Story (chamber orchestra) (2006)
- Fantasia on themes from West Side Story (full orchestra) (2006)
- Alberta Echoes (2005)
- Always Be True (brass, percussion, organ & strings) (2002)
- Loch na Beiste ( 2001)
- An Overture for the Worlds (2001)
- On the Shoulders of Giants (2000/1)
- Shadows & Light (2000)

Orchestra with Choir

- O Canada (arrangement for orchestra, organ & choir) (2004)
- We Stood Beside Each Other (choir and orchestra) (2000/1)

Orchestra with Dancers

- A Wild Symphonic Ride (2002)

Orchestra with Soloist(s)

- Dreaming of the Masters III (trumpet and orchestra) 2010
- Dreaming of the Masters II - Rhapsody GEB (piano and orchestra) (2007)
- Concerto for Oboe, Strings and Harpsichord (2004/5)
- Concerto for Accordion and String Orchestra (2004)
- Dreaming of the Masters I (clarinet and orchestra) (2003)
- Gaol's Rhuah Ròs - A Celtic Concerto for Two Harps and Orchestra (2002/3)
- Concerto for Violin and Orchestra (2002)
- Concerto for Trumpet (1993)

Vocal

- Words for Music Perhaps (tenor and piano) (1993)

Choral

- Ubi Caritas (SATB choir, brass quintet and organ) (2003)
- Blessed (SATB a cappella choir) (2002)
- A la esperanza (2 marimbas and SATB choir) (2001)
- In My Cloudless Days (SATB a cappella choir) (1997)
- He Tells of Perfect Beau'y (SATB a cappella choir) (1995)
- Beloved be at Peace (SATB a cappella choir) (1995)
- The Cloths of Heaven (SATB a cappella choir) (1994)

Wind Ensemble

- Inspiration (2006)
- Dreaming of the Masters I (clarinet and wind ensemble) (2003) (adapted from orchestral version)
- Concerto for Piccolo Trumpet (piccolo trumpet and wind ensemble) (2004/5)

(adapted from Concerto for Oboe, Strings and Harpsichord)

- Pulsar (2005)
- For 250 years (2004)
- Loch na Beiste (2001)
- Dreamscapes (2002)
- Amaryllis (1998)
- Ascension (1997)
- ukuTusa (1995)
