= Edmonton Symphony Orchestra =

Orchestra

- Orchestra
- Founded: 1920; 106 years ago
- Location: Edmonton, Alberta, Canada
- Concert hall: Francis Winspear Centre for Music
- Website: www.winspearcentre.com

The Edmonton Symphony Orchestra (ESO) is a Canadian orchestra based in Edmonton, Alberta. As the professional orchestra of Alberta's creative capital city it presents over 85 concerts a year of symphonic music in all genres, from classical to country. Currently in its 74th season, the orchestra is composed of 56 core professional musicians who perform 42 weeks per season and who play an active role in the musical life of Edmonton and elsewhere as performers, teachers and recording artists. The ESO also performs as the orchestra for Edmonton Opera and Alberta Ballet productions, and its recordings are regularly heard across Canada on CBC Radio 2.

== History ==
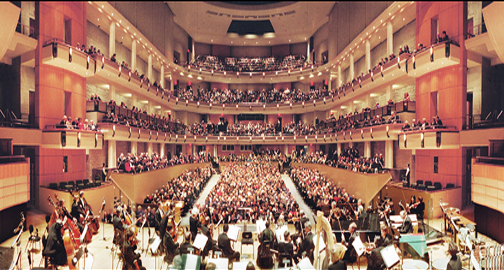
The Edmonton Symphony Orchestra at the Winspear Centre

The Edmonton Symphony Orchestra was initially formed as Edmonton's community orchestra and performed its first concert on November 15, 1920. The orchestra suspended operations in 1932 due to lack of funds, but was revived on October 31, 1952, when it was incorporated as a registered not-for-profit organization (the Edmonton Symphony Society), and gave its first performance on November 30, 1952. It made the transition to a fully professional orchestra in September 1971. In 1973, it was decided to restrict the orchestra to "classical" size.

Prior to the COVID-19 pandemic, the ESO's budget was over $10 million, and its players were the highest-paid Canadian orchestral musicians west of Toronto.

== Music directors, conductors, concertmasters, and artistic leaders ==
=== Music and artistic directors ===
- Jean-Marie Zeitouni 2025–present
- Alexander Prior 2017–2022 (Chief Conductor)
- William Eddins 2005–2017 (named Music Director Emeritus in 2017)
- Grzegorz Nowak 1994–2002
- Uri Mayer 1981–1994 (named Conductor Laureate in 1994)
- Pierre Hétu 1973–1979, 1979–1980 (Principal Guest Conductor)
- Lawrence Leonard 1968–1973
- Brian Priestman 1964–1968
- Lee Hepner 1952–1960

=== Conductors ===
- Michael Stern 2022–2024 (Artistic Advisor)
- Cosette Justo Valdés 2019–2021 (Assistant Conductor), 2021–2025 (Resident Conductor)
- Lucas Waldin 2009–2012 (Resident Conductor)
- Petar Dundjerski 2006–2008 (Assistant Conductor in Residence)
- Kazuyoshi Akiyama 2004–2005 (Principal Guest Conductor)
- Franz-Paul Decker 2003–2004 (Principal Guest Conductor)
- David Hoyt 1987–2002 (Resident Guest Conductor, Resident Conductor), 2002–2003 (artistic director)
- Peter Nero 1984–1985 (Pops Music Director)
- Daniel Swift 1983–1984 (Assistant Conductor)
- Yuval Zaliouk 1980–1981 (Interim Chief Conductor)
- Mitch Miller 1979–1982 (Principal Guest Conductor for Pops)
- Peter McCoppin 1978–1980 (Assistant Conductor)
- John Barnum 1973–1977 (Assistant Conductor)
- Edward (Ted) Kardash 1971–1973 (Assistant Conductor)
- Tom Rolston 1960–1964 (Associate Conductor)

=== Concertmasters ===
- Robert Uchida 2013–present
- Eric Buchmann (interim) 2010–2013
- Martin Riseley 1994–2010
- Eric Buchmann, Richard Caldwell, Virginie Gagné, Broderyk Olson (interim, in rotation) 2009–2010
- John Lowry 2002–2003 (interim)
- James Keene 1972–1994
- Charles (Karol) Dobiáš 1970–1972
- Marguerite Marzantowicz 1960–1964 (interim), 1964–1970
- Tom Rolston 1958–1964
- Walter Holowach 1957–1958 (interim)
- Alexander Nicol 1952–1957

== Performing venue ==
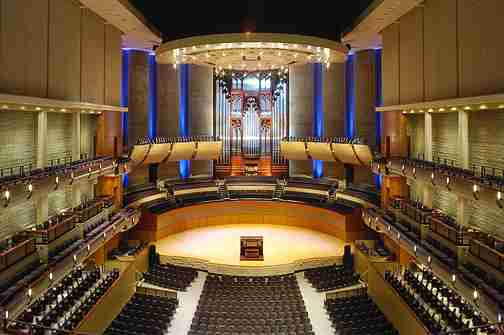
The Francis Winspear Centre for Music

In September 1997, the Edmonton Symphony Society and the Edmonton Concert Hall Foundation successfully completed a two-decade, $45 million capital campaign, and the ESO moved from the Northern Alberta Jubilee Auditorium (the orchestra's principal performing venue since 1957) into its new concert hall, the acoustically superb, 1716 seat Francis Winspear Centre for Music. The inaugural gala, at which the ESO performed Mahler's Symphony of a Thousand with the Calgary Philharmonic Orchestra, took place on September 13, 1997.

== Programming and special events ==
Each season, almost 30,000 students experience the orchestra's music at the Winspear Centre. The Young Composers Project, with local composers as mentors, allows select high school students to compose orchestral works and hear them in performance. The orchestra's annual outdoor Symphony Under the Sky Festival is a popular destination for Edmontonians on Labour Day weekend.

The ESO's history and the varied nature of its programming reflect its imaginative commitment to its community.

- In 1972, the Procol Harum album Procol Harum Live: In Concert with the Edmonton Symphony Orchestra and its hit single "Conquistador" became the first orchestral recording to achieve international platinum sales.
- In 1985, the ESO premiered Malcolm Forsyth's Atayoskewin at the opening of Shell Canada's Scotford Refinery.
- In 1980, to celebrate Alberta's 75th anniversary, the orchestra toured the province.
- In 1986, the ESO performed at Vancouver's Expo 86.
- In 1994, the orchestra undertook a five-city tour (the "Northern Lights Tour") of northern Alberta, the Yukon and the Northwest Territories.
- In 1996, the ESO became the first Canadian orchestra to play on a First Nations Reserve.
- On May 8, 2012, the ESO made its Carnegie Hall debut, its first performance outside of Canada.

=== Special concerts ===
Special ESO concerts drawing sold-out houses have featured, among others, k.d. lang in 1985, Tom Cochrane and Red Rider in 1989, The Arrogant Worms in 2002, Corb Lund in 2005, Paul Brandt in 2006, Video Games Live in 2007, Nikki Yanofsky in 2008, reunion concerts with Procol Harum in 1992 and 2010, Ben Folds in 2012 and 2014, and Ian Tyson on the 100th anniversary of the Province of Alberta on September 1, 2005. In March 2011, the ESO presented a memorable concert devoted exclusively to the music of Frank Zappa, and in December 2005, the orchestra returned to the Northern Alberta Jubilee Auditorium to present two sold-out Christmas concerts with Christian singer/pianist Michael W. Smith. The orchestra continues this tradition of working with musicians from a variety of musical genres. In December 2012, the orchestra performed two Christmas concerts with the Barenaked Ladies. In December 2017, the orchestra performed four Christmas concerts with Jann Arden.

== Composers in residence ==
John McPherson was the orchestra's fourth Composer in Residence (2016–2017) and wrote two major works during his residency:

- Concerto for Two Horns "Mountain Triptych" (2017)
- Triune (2017)

Robert Rival, the orchestra's third Composer in Residence (2011–2014) wrote six major works for the orchestra during his residency:

- Delights & Discords (2014)
- Northwest Passage Variations (2014)
- Symphony No. 2 "Water" (2013)
- Achilles and Scamander (2012)
- Lullaby (2012)
- Whirlwind (2012)

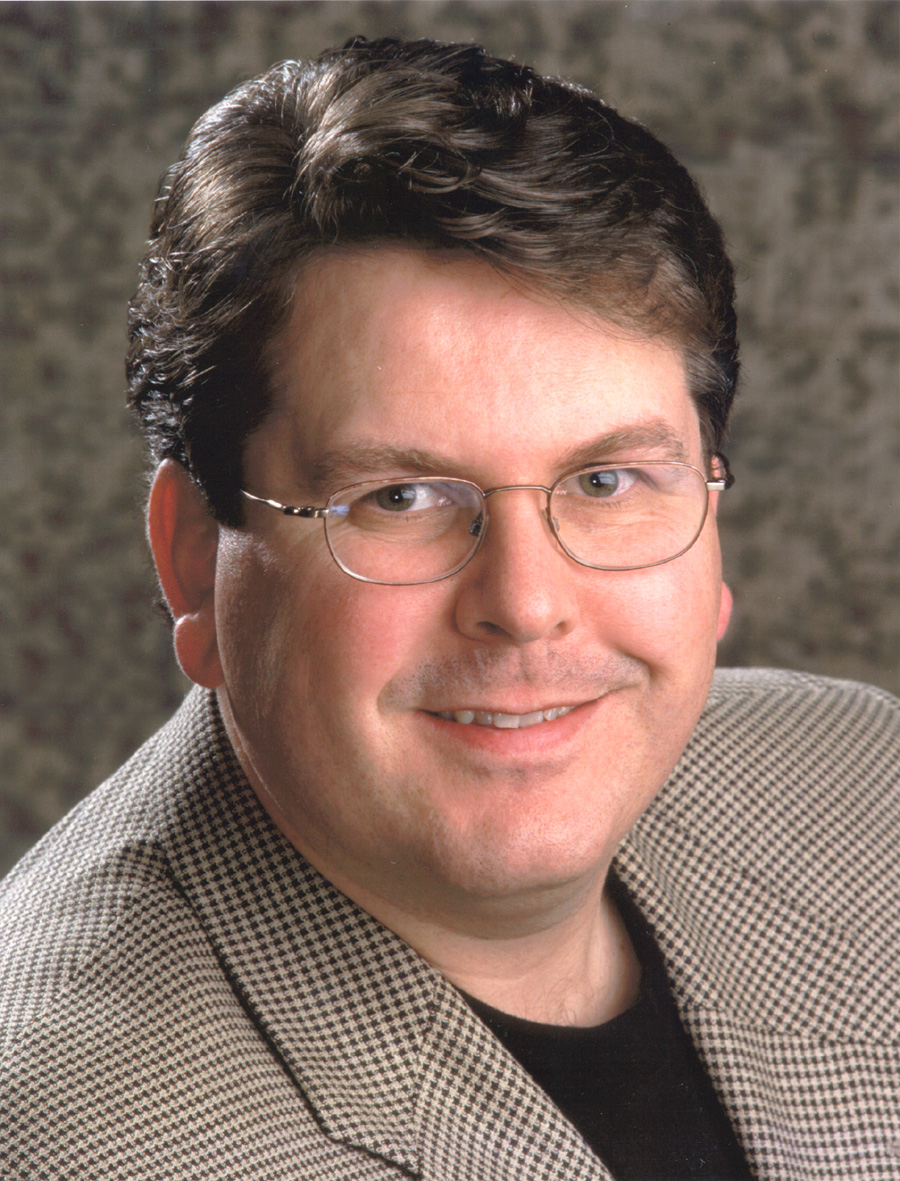
Allan Gilliland

Allan Gilliland, the ESO's second Composer in Residence (2000–2004) composed nine major works for the orchestra, as well as a colorful new orchestration of Canada's national anthem. Before his residency, Gilliland had been commissioned to write two works for the ESO. Following his residency, he was commissioned to write two jazz-flavoured works: a rhapsody for piano and orchestra, and a suite for trumpet and orchestra.

- Dreaming of the Masters III (2010) (funded by the Alberta Foundation for the Arts)
- Dreaming of the Masters II (Rhapsody GEB) (2008) (co-commission with CBC)
- Above the Fold (2004)
- Calixa Lavallée O Canada (new orchestration) (2004)
- Dreaming of the Masters I (2003)
- Gaol's Ruadh Ròs – A Celtic Concerto for Two Harps (2003)
- Always Be True (2002)
- Violin Concerto (2002)
- A Wild Symphonic Ride (2002)
- Loch na Beiste (2001)
- On the Shoulders of Giants (2001)
- Shadows and Light (2000)
- Winspear Fanfare (1997)
- Trumpet Concerto (1994)

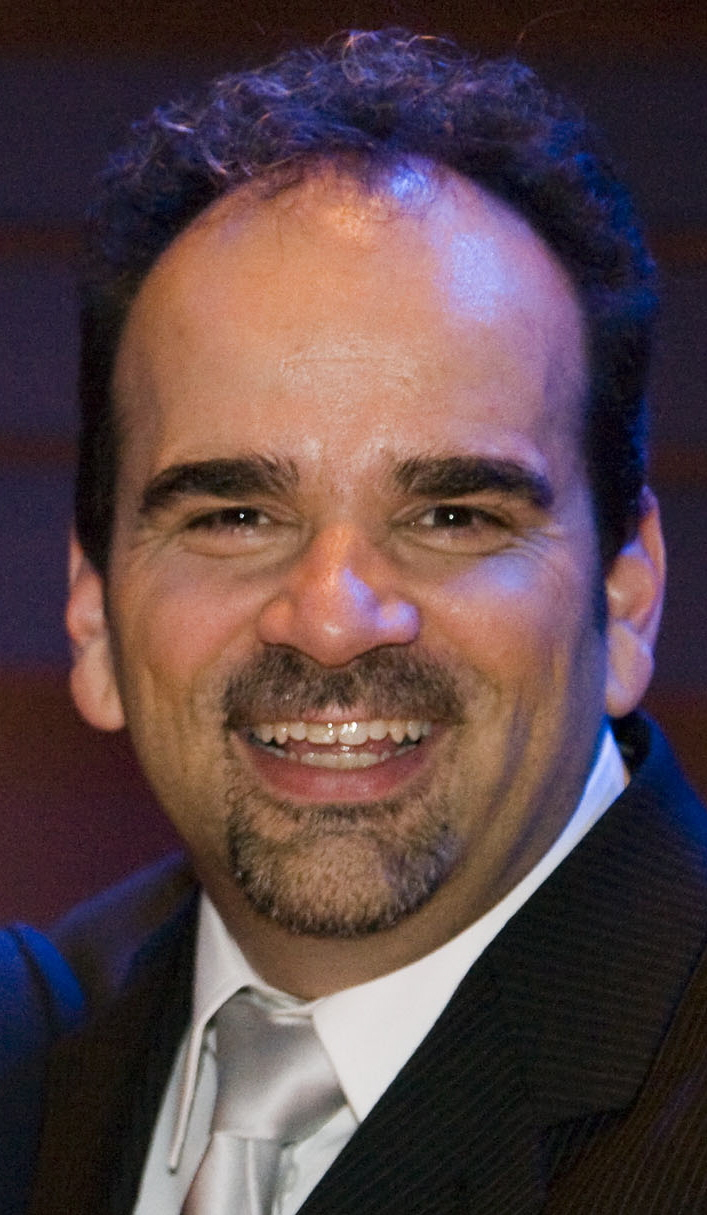
John Estacio

John Estacio was the ESO's first Composer in Residence (1992–1999). He also produced nine major works for the orchestra during his residency:

- The Twins and the Monster (2001)
- The Brass Ring (1999)
- Frenergy (1998)
- Concerto for Piano, Violin and Cello (1997)
- Wondrous Light (1997)
- Borealis (1997)
- Victims of Us All (1996)
- A Farmer's Symphony (1994)
- Alegria (1994)

== Canadian commissions ==
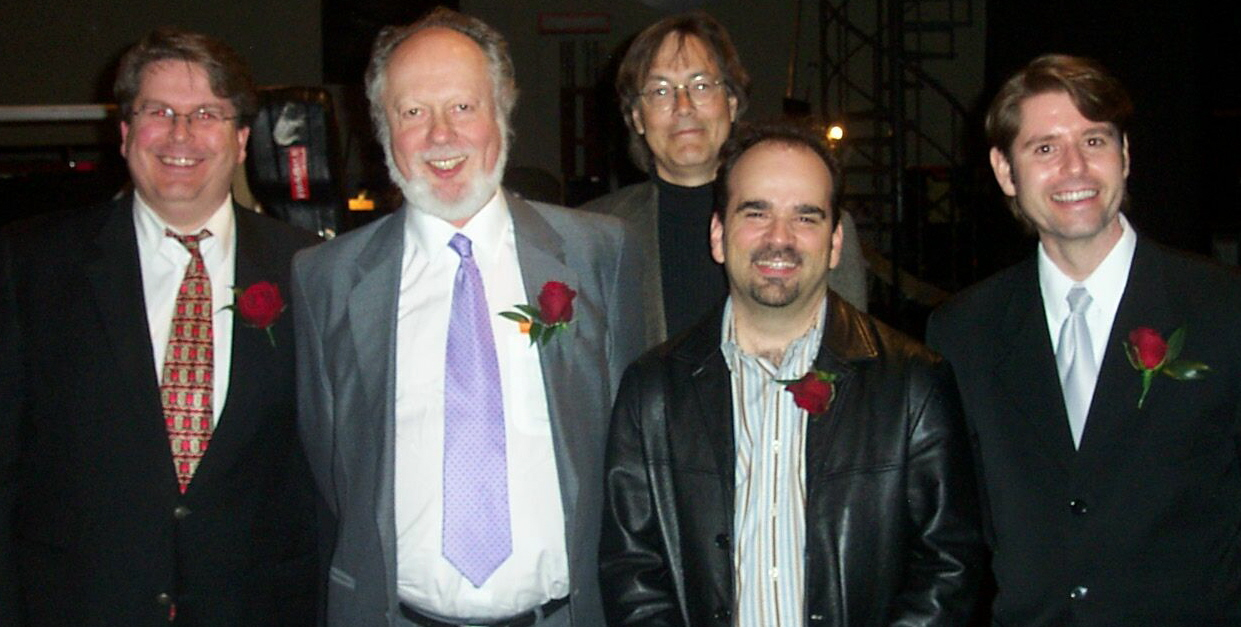
Composers Allan Gilliland, Malcolm Forsyth, Allan Gordon Bell, John Estacio, and Jeffrey McCune following the Edmonton Symphony's performance of their music in April 2005

The ESO has a long tradition of commissioning and performing works by Canadian – and particularly Albertan – composers. On April 29, 2005, the ESO presented a highly acclaimed concert of music by five contemporary Alberta composers – Allan Gordon Bell, John Estacio, Malcolm Forsyth, Allan Gilliland and Jeffrey McCune – in Southam Hall at Ottawa's National Arts Centre as part of the Alberta Scene festival. In May 2012, the ESO performed the US premieres of music by its first three Composers in Residence at Carnegie Hall's second annual Spring for Music festival.

Works commissioned by the Edmonton Symphony Orchestra include:

- Louis Applebaum Concertante / Prelude / Incantation / Sinfonia / Evocations for Two Pianos and Orchestra
- Violet Archer Prelude - incantation / Sinfonia
- Allan Gordon Bell Symphonies of Hidden Fire
- Patrick Cardy Trobadores
- George Fiala Overtura Buffa
- Malcolm Forsyth Symphony No. 2 '... A Host of Nomads...' / Requiem for the Victims in a Wartorn World / Siyajabula! We Rejoice! / A Ballad of Canada
- Allan Gilliland Dreaming of the Masters II
- Stewart Grant Symphony "Et in Terra…"
- Ronald Hannah Suite of orchestral dances: the common air that bathes the globe
- Jacques Hétu Organ Concerto
- Yuri Laniuk Palimpsesty
- Raymond Luedeke Tales of the Netsilik
- Rod McKuen The Ballad of Distances - Symphonic Suite, Opus 40
- François Morel Neumes d'espace et reliefs
- Jeffrey McCune Aquamarine / Dance Suite / Overture Sauvage
- John McPherson Walk in Beauty
- Kelly-Marie Murphy Utterances
- Cha Ka Nin Memento Mori
- Randolph Peters WildFire
- Laurie Radford a tangle in the throat
- Manus Sasonkin Musica post prandia
- Robert Turner Shades of Autumn

== Commercial discography and videography ==
Procol Harum Live: In Concert with the Edmonton Symphony Orchestra

(Procol Harum, Da Camera Singers, Lawrence Leonard conductor, 1972)

Conquistador / Whaling Stories / A Salty Dog / All This and More / In Held 'Twas In I / Luskus Delph / Simple Sister (Rehearsal Version) / Shine on Brightly (Rehearsal Version) / A Salty Dog (Rehearsal Version) / Luskus Delph (Rehearsal Version)

Music by Haydn, Debussy, Wirén

(Boris Brott ^{1} and John Avison ^{2} conductors, 1973) (CBC SM-284)

Haydn Symphony No. 99 ^{1} / Debussy Petit suite: En bateau ^{2} / Wirén March ^{2}

McKuen The Ballad Of Distances: Symphonic Suite, Opus 40

(Tommy Banks conductor, 1973) (WB 2WS 2731)

Scarlet and Gold / L'Escarlet et L'Or - Alberta R.C.M.P. Century Celebrations, 1874-1974

(Members of the Gleichen Alberta Blackfoot Indian Reserve^{1}, Father Colin Levangie chanter^{1}, Father Jacques Jolie chanter^{1}, Father Ubald Duchesneau chanter^{1}, Roy Warhurst fiddle^{1}, Tommy Banks conductor, 1974) (Denali SGLP 1001)

Dere Overture ^{1}/ Rebellion / Tribute to the R.C.M.P.

Music by Wolf, Purcell, Adaskin, Warlock

(Pierre Hétu conductor, 1975) (CBC SM-294)

Wolf Italian Serenade / Purcell The Married Beau Suite (Arranged by Holst) / Adaskin Diversion for orchestra (an entertainment) / Warlock Six Italian Dances

Music by Ibert, Françaix, Rameau

(Pierre Hétu conductor, 1976) (CBC SM-316)

Ibert Suite symphonique: "Paris" / Françaix Sérénade / Rameau Les fêtes d'Hébé

Orchestral Suites of the British Isles

(Uri Mayer conductor, 1984) (CBC SM 5035, SMC 5035, SMCD 5035)

Vaughan Williams English Folk Song Suite / Warlock Capriol Suite / Harty A John Field Suite

Great Verdi Arias

(Louis Quilico baritone, Uri Mayer conductor, 1985) (CBC SM 5043, SMC 5043, SMCD 5043)

"E sogno o realtà?" (Falstaff) / "Morir! tremenda cosa...Urna fatale de mio destino" (La forza del destino) / "Cortigiani, vil razza dannata" (Rigoletto) / "Vanne! la tua meta già vedo...Credo in un Dio crude!" (Otello) / "Perfidi!...Pietà, rispetto, amore" (Macbeth) / "Tutto è deserto...Il Balen del suo soriso" (Il trovatore) / "Di Provenza il mar, il suol" (La traviata) / "Alzati! là tuo figlio...Eri tu che macchiavi quell’anima" (Un ballo in maschera)

Great Tenor Arias

(Ermanno Mauro tenor, Uri Mayer conductor, 1986) (CBC SM 5046, SMC 5046, SMCD 5046)

Bizet "La fleur que tu m’avais jetée" (Carmen) / Massenet "O Souverain, ô juge, ô père!" (Le Cid) / Puccini "Che gelida manina" (La bohème) / Leoncavallo "Recitar!...Vesti la giubba" (Pagliacci) / Verdi "Niun mi tema" (Otello) / Gounod "Ah! lêve-toi, soleil" (Roméo et Juliette) / Massenet "Pourquoi me réveiller?" (Werther) / Puccini "E lucevan le stelle" (Tosca) / Puccini "Nessun dorma" (Turandot) / Giordano "Un dì all'azzuro spazio", also known as "L'improvviso" (Andrea Chénier) / Verdi "Ma se m'è forza perderti" (Un ballo in maschera) / Verdi "Ah si, ben mio...Di quella pira" (Il trovatore)

Music by Forsyth and Freedman

(Uri Mayer conductor, 1986) (SM 5059, SMC 5059, SMCD 5059)

Freedman Oiseaux exotiques / Forsyth Atayoskewin (Juno Award: Best Classical Composition)

Canadian and Russian Overtures

(Uri Mayer conductor, 1986) (CBC SM 5069, SMC 5069, SMCD 5069)

Forsyth Jubilee Overture / Ridout Fall Fair / Morawetz Overture to a Fairy Tale / Shostakovich Festive Overture, Opus 96 / Borodin Prince Igor: Overture / Kabalevsky Colas Breugnon: Overture / Glinka Russlan and Ludmilla: Overture

Anthology of Canadian Music, Volume 27

(Uri Mayer conductor, 1987) (RCI 5-ACM 27)

Fiala The Kurelek Suite

Harp Concertos

(Gianetta Baril harp, Uri Mayer conductor, 1989) (CBC SM 5086, SMC 5086, SMCD 5086)

Ginastera Harp Concerto, Opus 25 / Morawetz Concerto for Harp and Chamber Orchestra (Juno Award: Best Classical Composition)

Great Orchestral Marches

(Uri Mayer conductor, 1990) (CBC SM 5093, SMC 5093, SMCD 5093)

Fučík Entrance of the Gladiators / Alford Colonel Bogey / Sousa Stars and Stripes Forever / Elgar Pomp & Circumstance No. 4 / Farnon State Occasion / Papineau-Couture Marche de Guillaument / Beethoven Turkish March (from The Ruins of Athens) / Schubert Marche Militaire (Arranged by Schönherr) / Johann Strauss I Radetzky March / Willan Centennial March / Delibes Cortège de Bacchus / Tchaikovsky Jurisprudence March / Baker March (Evocations, Movement II) / Adaskin March No. 2 / Halvorsen Triumphal Entry of the Boyars / Grieg March of the Dwarfs (from Lyric Suite / Herbert March of the Toys (from Babes in Toyland) (Arranged by Otto Langey) / Rodgers March of the Siamese Children (from The King & I) (Arranged by Bennett) / Williams The Imperial March (from The Empire Strikes Back)

Works for Cello and Orchestra

(Shauna Rolston cello, Uri Mayer conductor, 1989) (CBC SM 5105, SMC 5105, SMCD 5105)

Morawetz Memorial to Martin Luther King / Bruch Kol Nidrei, Opus 47 / Fauré Élégie for Cello and Orchestra, Opus 24 / Dvořák Silent Woods, Opus 68 No. 5 / Bliss Concerto for Cello and Orchestra

The Symphony Sessions

(Tom Cochrane, Red Rider, George Blondheim conductor, 1989) (EMI C2 0 7777 2654 2 8)

Light in the Tunnel / Human Race / Can't Turn Back / Napoleon Sheds His Skin / White Hot / Big League / Calling America / Avenue "A" / Bird on a Wire / Boy Inside the Man / Lunatic Fringe / Good Times / The Next Life

Music by Britten and Willan

(Uri Mayer conductor, 1993) (SMCD 5123)

Britten Canadian Carnival, Opus 19 / Britten Peter Grimes: Four Sea Interludes, Opus 33a / Willan Symphony No. 2 in C minor

Russian Sketches

(Uri Mayer conductor, 1997) (CBC SMCD 5169)

Ippolitov-Ivanov Caucasian Sketches, Opus 10 / Tchaikovsky Eugene Onegin, Opus 24: Polonaise / Tchaikovsky The Sleeping Beauty, Opus 66: Waltz / Shostakovich The Age of Gold: Suite, Opus 22a: Polka / Borodin In the Steppes of Central Asia / Rimsky-Korsakov The Golden Cockerel: Suite

Electra Rising: Music of Malcolm Forsyth

(William Street saxophone, Amanda Forsyth cello, Grzegorz Nowak conductor, 1997) (SMCD 5180)

Valley of a Thousand Hills / Tre Vie / Electra Rising (Juno Award: Best Classical Composition)

Music by Smetana and Janáček

(Grzegorz Nowak conductor, 1999) (Music of Central Europe MCE 5001)

Smetana Má vlast (original 1875 version) / Janáček Moravian Dances

P.J. Perry and the Edmonton Symphony Orchestra

(P.J. Perry, saxophone, David Hoyt conductor, 1999)

Django / Charlie Parker Medley / Bossa Nova Medley / They Kept Bach's Head Alive / Ballad Medley / Hand In Hand / Harlem Nocturne / The Old Castle / Strike Up The Band

Semi-Conducted (CD) / Three Worms and an Orchestra (DVD)

(The Arrogant Worms, David Hoyt conductor, 2003)

Overture / Big Fat Road Manager / Canada's Really Big / Rocks and Trees / Log In to You / I am Cow / Last Saskatchewan Pirate / Gaelic Song / Me Like Hockey / Carrot Juice is Murder / Dangerous / Billy the Theme Park Shark / Celine Dion / We are the Beaver

Frenergy: The Music of John Estacio

(Mario Bernardi conductor, 2004) (CBC SMCD 5232)

Frenergy / A Farmer's Symphony / Bootlegger's Tarantella / Such Sweet Sorrow / Solaris / Borealis / Wondrous Light

Steve Bell in concert with the Edmonton Symphony Orchestra (DVD)

(Steve Bell, vocalist, Rei Hotoda conductor, 2008)

Here By the Water / Deep Calls to Deep / Waiting for Aidan / Burning Ember / Lord of the Starfields / Even So / Wellspring / Holy Lord

Carl Czerny - A Rediscovered Genius

(Jolaine Kerley soprano, Joy-Anne Murphy alto, Benjamin Butterfield tenor, Paul Grindlay bass, André Moisan clarinet, Grzegorz Nowak ^{1} and Leonard Ratzlaff ^{2} conductors, 2011; recorded in 2002) (DOREMI DHR-6011-3)

Grand Overture in C minor, Opus 142 ^{1} / Overture in E major ^{2} / Offertorium: "Benedicat nos Deus", Opus 737 ^{2}

Logos Futura

(Antonio Peruch accordion, Grzegorz Nowak conductor, 2011; recorded in 2001) (FisarmonicArt AP201101)

Forsyth Concerto for Accordion and Orchestra

A Concert for New York

(Angela Cheng piano, Denise Djokic cello, Juliette Kang violin, Jens Lindemann trumpet, William Eddins conductor, 2013) (ESO LIVE 2012-05-01)

Robert Rival Lullaby / Estacio Triple Concerto / Gilliland Dreaming of the Masters III / Martinů Symphony No. 1 / Bernstein "Mambo" (from Symphonic Dances from "West Side Story")

True North - The Canadian Songbook

(Eleanor McCain vocalist, Denise Djokic cello, Paul Pike native flute, Pro Coro Canada, Martin MacDonald conductor, 2017)

McLachlan Angel (Arranged by Darren Fung) / Robertson Broken Arrow (Arranged by Don Breithaupt) / MacLellan Snowbird (Arranged by Don Breithaupt)
