= David Hoyt =

David Hoyt may refer to:

- David Hoyt (conductor), Canadian horn player and conductor
- David L. Hoyt (born 1965), American puzzle and game inventor
- David B. Hoyt, executive director of the American College of Surgeons
