= Rolston (surname) =

Rolston is a surname. Notable people with the surname include:

- Brian Rolston (born 1973), hockey player
- Ed Rolston (born 1990), Hong Kong rugby player
- Emma Rolston (born 1996), New Zealand football player
- Holmes Rolston III (1932–2025), American philosopher
- Ken Rolston, American computer and game designer
- Mark Rolston (born 1956), American actor
- Matthew Rolston, American photographer
- Peter Rolston (1937–2006), Canadian minister and politician
- Ron Rolston (born 1966), American ice hockey coach
- Shauna Rolston (born 1967), Canadian cellist
- Steve Rolston (born 1978), Canadian comic book artist
- Tilly Rolston (1887–1953), Canadian politician
- Tom Rolston (1932–2010), Canadian violinist and conductor
