= Martin Riseley =

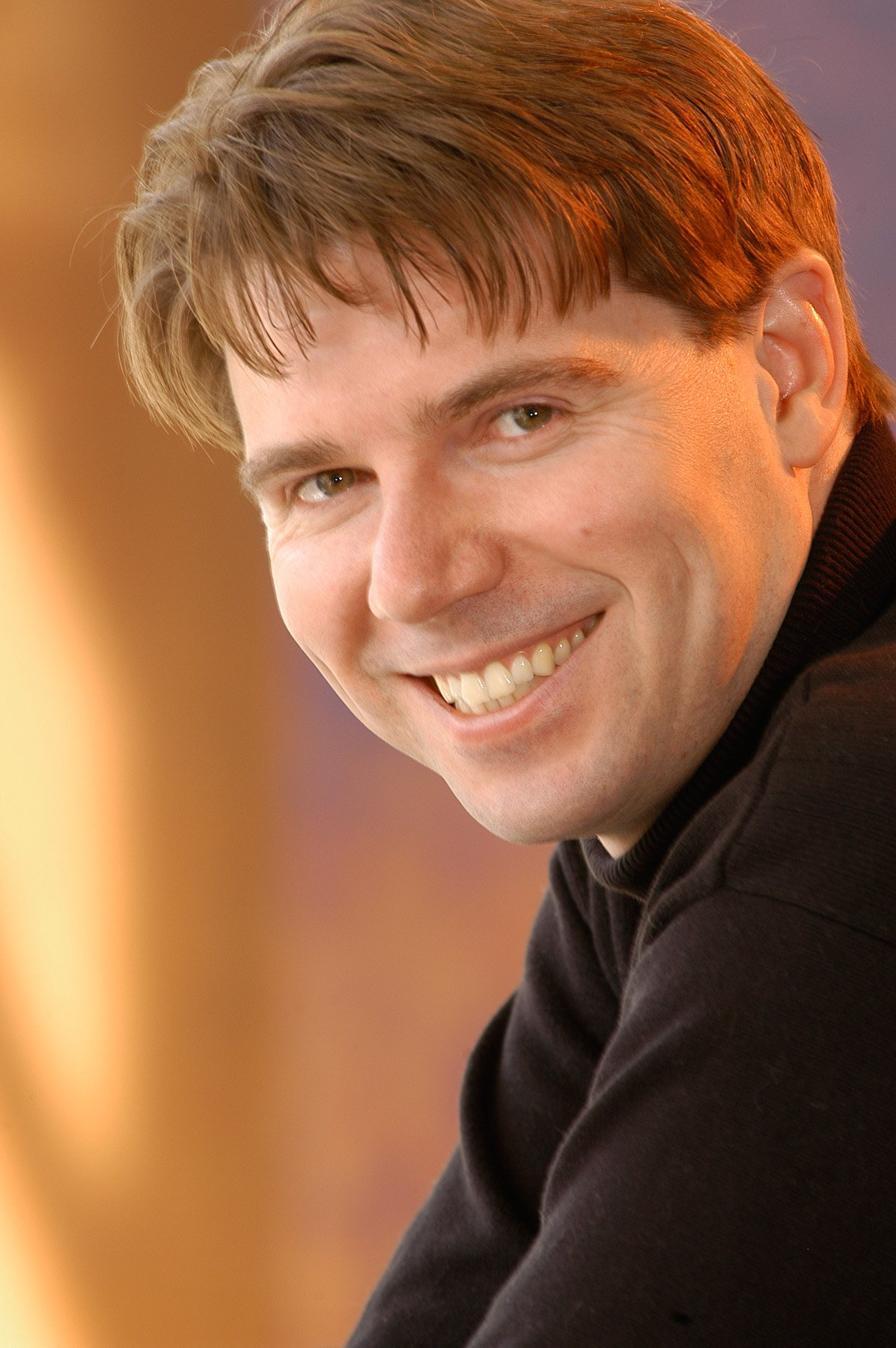

Background information
- Born: 1969 (age 56–57)
- Origin: New Zealand
- Genres: Classical
- Occupation: Head of Strings (violin) at the New Zealand School of Music
- Instrument: Violin

Martin Riseley (born 10 February 1969 in Christchurch, New Zealand) is a violinist and Head of Strings (violin) at the New Zealand School of Music. Formerly, he was concertmaster of the Edmonton Symphony Orchestra.

Riseley began violin studies at age 6, and gave his first solo concert at age 10. He studied with Carl Pini, Dorothy DeLay, and Felix Galimir. He graduated from the Juilliard School in 1996 with a Doctorate of Musical Arts.

In August 1994, Riseley was appointed concertmaster of the Edmonton Symphony Orchestra, a position he held until August 2010. He has performed the North American premieres of the violin concerto The Bulls of Bashan by Gavin Bryars, and the Violin Concerto (2002) by Allan Gilliland. He performed regularly as soloist with the ESO, in a variety of major concerti.

In 2010 he returned to New Zealand, taking a teaching position at the New Zealand School of Music, the same year he was also appointed Concertmaster of the Christchurch Symphony Orchestra. He served as Interim Associate Concertmaster of the National Arts Centre Orchestra (2002–2003), and was guest concertmaster of the New Zealand Symphony Orchestra in 2003.

He has two daughters, Emma (2000), and Izzie (2004). They both played violin for many years.
