= Grzegorz Nowak (conductor) =

Polish conductor

Grzegorz Nowak (born 15 August 1951, Poznań) is a Polish conductor. He has served as music director of the Polish National Opera, the Edmonton Symphony Orchestra, the SWR Radio Orchestra in Kaiserslautern, Germany), and Sinfonia Helvetica and festival Musique and Amitié in Switzerland. He is currently the music director and principal conductor of the Philippine Philharmonic Orchestra and the Principal Associate Conductor of the Royal Philharmonic Orchestra in London.

== Biography ==
Born in Poznań, Poland, he began his international conducting career by winning the first prize at the Ernest Ansermet Conducting Competition in Geneva. He also won the Grand Prix Patek Philippe, Rolex Prize, Swiss Prize, American Patronage Prize and the Europäische Förderpreis für Musik as the European Musician of the Year. Nowak was honoured with the Distinguished Teacher Award during his tenure as Professor at Bowling Green State University, and the title of "Honorary Professor" was bestowed upon him by the University of Alberta.

After studying conducting, composition and violin at the Music Academy in Poznań, Nowak was awarded a doctorate fellowship at the Eastman School of Music. He honed his skills at Tanglewood on a Serge Koussevitzky Fellowship with such masters as Leonard Bernstein, Seiji Ozawa, Erich Leinsdorf and Igor Markevitch, before assisting Kurt Masur with the New York Philharmonic Orchestra.

In Europe Nowak has worked as a conductor with the Royal Philharmonic Orchestra, London Symphony Orchestra, Monte-Carlo Philharmonic Orchestra, Orchestre National de France, Orchestre Lamoureaux in Paris, Orchestra dell'Accademia Nazionale di Santa Cecilia in Rome, RAI orchestras in Milan, Rome and Turin, Orchestre de la Suisse Romande in Geneva, Tonhalle Orchestra in Zürich, National Orchestra of Belgium, Luxembourg Philharmonic Orchestra, Warsaw Philharmonic Orchestra, National Orchestra of Spain and the Gulbenkian Orchestra in Lisbon. He has also conducted many times in Scandinavia, performing with the philharmonic and radio orchestras of Oslo, Stockholm, Helsinki and Copenhagen.

In North America, Nowak has conducted the Montreal Symphony, Vancouver Symphony, Baltimore Symphony, Cincinnati Symphony, Carmel Symphony, San Diego Symphony, Buffalo Philharmonic orchestras and the Xalapa Symphony in Mexico. He has also earned critical acclaim for his performances in the Far East and elsewhere with the Philharmonic and Yomiuri Orchestras in Tokyo, Hong Kong Philharmonic, Taipei Philharmonic in Taiwan and the Jerusalem Symphony Orchestra. Since 2023, he has been the music director and principal conductor of the Philippine Philharmonic Orchestra.

Nowak has conducted operatic productions in Italy, Monte Carlo, Switzerland, Germany, Poland, the United Kingdom, Sweden, the United States and Canada, including works by Mozart (The Marriage of Figaro, Don Giovanni, Il Seraglio, Così fan Tutte, The Magic Flute), Rossini (The Barber of Seville, Semiramide), Beethoven (Fidelio), Bizet (Carmen), Borodin (Prince Igor), Moniuszko (Halka, Haunted Manor), Verdi (Otello, Don Carlos and the Polish première of Simon Boccanegra) and Puccini (Madam Butterfly, La bohème, Turandot and Tosca – including a tour with Welsh National Opera). His production of Debussy's Le Martyre de Saint Sébastien was broadcast live from Rome on the Eurovision television network. He received rave reviews at the 2006 Internationale Maifestspiele Wiesbaden for conducting Giordano's Andrea Chénier, a co-production of the Polish National Opera with Plácido Domingo and the National Opera in Washington.

His recordings have been highly acclaimed by the press and public alike, winning many awards. Diapason in Paris praised his KOS CD with Martha Argerich and Sinfonia Varsovia as 'indispensable... un must', and the second edition of this recording won the Fryderyk Award. The Polish Symphonic Music of the 19th Century recording with Sinfonia Varsovia won the CD of the Year Award, a nomination for the Fryderyk Award and the Bronze Bell Award in Singapore. The American Record Guide praised Nowak's Gallo label CD of Frank Martin Violin Concerto with Piotr Milewski and the Biel Symphony as 'by far the best'. Chopin's piano concerti with Janusz Olejniczak and Sinfonia Varsovia won the Fryderyk and CD of the Year awards, and his CD with Stanislaw Drzewiecki and Sinfonia Varsovia was also nominated for the Fryderyk Award. His Haenssler-classic disc with Anja Silja won two Classical Internet Awards, and his recording of Czerny Symphonies No. 2 and 6 (world premiere recording) received critical acclaim around the world. His CBC record with the Edmonton Symphony Orchestra and Amanda Forsyth won the Juno Award, the CD-Accord recording with Joanna Kozłowska and the Poznań Philharmonic was hailed as 'superb' and Gramophone Magazine praised his ASV recording with the London Symphony Orchestra as 'outstanding'.

Nowak has performed alongside soloists, including pianists Vladimir Ashkenazy, Angela Hewitt and Anton Kuerti. He has performed many times with Krystian Zimerman, including tours in Switzerland, Italy and Spain. He has accompanied violinists Nigel Kennedy, Adam Taubitz, Joseph Silverstein and Pinchas Zukerman, among others. Nowak has worked with several cellists, including Ofra Harnoy and Mstislav Rostropovich. He has collaborated with singers, including Ben Heppner, Marilyn Horne, Gwyneth Jones, Kathleen Battle, Ewa Podles and the Swingle Singers.

== Discography ==
Year	Orchestra	Works	Soloists, Prizes	Label
2017	Royal Philharmonic Orchestra	Mieczysław Karłowicz: Returning Waves; Mieczysław Karłowicz: Eternal Songs; Mieczysław Karłowicz: Lithuanian Rhapsody		RPO SP 52
2007	Royal Philharmonic Orchestra	Mendelssohn: Symphony No. 3 'Scottish'; Mendelssohn: Symphony No. 4 'Italian'		RPO SP 011
1985	London Symphony Orchestra	Bartók: Dance Suite; Ravel: Daphnis et Chloé		ASV CD DCA 1794
2006	London Symphony Orchestra	Ravel: Daphnis et Chloé		Union Square Music USMCD011
1993	Sinfonia Varsovia	Rossini: L'Italiana in Algeri; Chopin: Piano Concerto No. 1 Mendelssohn: Symphony No. 4 'Italian'	Martha Argerich	KOS CD S1-002K
2000	Sinfonia Varsovia	Chopin: Piano Concerto No. 1 Chopin: Piano Concerto No. 2	Martha Argerich; Arthur Rubinstein; Fryderyk Award	CD-Accord ACD 080
2004	SWR Rundfunkorchester Kaiserslautern	Weill: The Seven Deadly Sins; Weill: Quodlibet	Anja Silja; Julius Pfeifer, Alexander Yudenkov, Bernhard Hartmann, Thorsten Müller; Classical Internet Award; French Classical Internet Award	CLASSIC CD 93.109
2006	SWR Rundfunkorchester Kaiserslautern	Czerny: Symphony No. 2 op. 781 'Grande Symphony'; Czerny: Symphony No. 6 in G minor	world premiere recording	CLASSIC CD 93.169
1995	Sinfonia Varsovia	Kurpinski – Two Huts (Dwie Chatki); Dobrzyński – Monbar; Moniuszko – The Fairy Tale (Bajka); Zelenski – In the Tatra Mountains (W Tatrach); Noskowski – The Steppes (Step)	CD of the Year; Bronze Bell Award (Singapore); Fryderyk Nomination	CD Accord-PolyGram ACD 019
1995	Sinfonia Varsovia	Chopin: Piano Concerto No. 1 Chopin: Piano Concerto No. 2	Janusz Olejniczak; CD of the Year; Fryderyk Award	CD-Accord-PolyGram-Rhône-Poulenc ACD 013
2005	Poznań Philharmonic	Puccini: •Si, mi chiamano Mimi – La bohème (Mimi) •Donde lieta usci al tuo grida d’amore – La bohème (Mimi) •Un bel di, vedremo – Madama Butterfly (Butterfly) •Tu…Piccolo Oddio – Madama Butterfly (Butterfly) •Signore ascolta – Turandot (Liu) •Tu che di gel sei cinta – Turandot (Liu) •Vissi d’arte – Tosca (Tosca) •O moi babbino caro – Gianni Schicchi (Lauretta); Verdi: •Pace moi Dio – La forza del destino (Leonora) •Era piu calmo?… Emilia, te ne prego… Piangea cantando… Ave Maria – Otello (Desdemona)	Joanna Kozłowska	CD Accord ACD 135–2
2005	Sinfonia Helvetica and Deutsches Kammerorchester	Dvořák: • Cello Concerto in B-minor, Op. 104 • Polonaise A-Dur, B. 94 • Silent Woods, Op. 68, No. 5 • Rondo g-moll, Op. 94	Wen-Sinn Yang	ARTS 47638–2
1998	Edmonton Symphony Orchestra	Malcolm Forsyth: •Electra Rising •Valley of a Thousand Hills •Tre Vie	Amanda Forsyth, violoncello Bill Street, saxophone Juno Award	CBC SMCD 5180
1990	Biel Symphony Orchestra	Martin – Violin Concerto; Baer – Violin Concerto; Meier – Trames I-IV	Piotr Milewski, violin	Gallo Records CD-582
1996	Sinfonia Varsovia	Wieniawski – Violin Concerto No. 1 Wieniawski – Violin Concerto No. 2	Piotr Plawner; Bartek Niziol; Fryderyk Nomination	CD Accord – PolyGram ACD 024-2 / 456 087–2
2007	Orchestre de Bretagne	Tchaikovski – Piano Concerto No. 1 Chopin – Piano Concerto No. 2	Laure Favre-Kahn	TRANSART LIVE TR 151
2005	Poznań Philharmonic	Mozart: •Don Giovanni – Champagne Aria •The Marriage of Figaro – Aria of Count 'Hai già vinta la causa!' Verdi: •Traviata – Aria of Germont 'Di Provenza li Mar' •Rigoletto – Aria of Rigoletto 'Cortigiani'; Borodin: Prince Igor – Aria of Igor; Tchaikovsky •Eugene Onegin – Aria of Oniegin •Yolande – Aria of Robert •The Queen of Spades – Aria of Jeletzky; Bizet: Carmen – Aria of Torreador; Wagner: Tannhäuser – Song of Wolfram	Wojtek Drabowicz	DUX 0494
1995	Warsaw National Philharmonic	J.S. Bach •Piano Concerto BWV 1052 in D Minor •Piano Concerto BWV 1054 in D Major •Piano Concerto BWV 1056 in F Minor	Piotr Folkert	Arti PD 3001
2007	SWR Rundfunkorchester Kaiserslautern	Weill – Quodlibet		hänssler CLASSIC
2001	Sinfonia Varsovia	Moniuszko – Mazurka from opera Haunted Manor	Platinum CD	DUX 0334A05100 92
1992	Gävle Symphony	Malmlöf-Forssling – Shanti, shanti	Anita Soldh	Bluebell ABCD 069
2001	Sinfonia Varsovia	Moniuszko – Bajka; Chopin – Piano Concerto No. 2 Noskowski – The Steppes	Janusz Olejniczak	CD Accord ACD 019-2 SE
2001	London Symphony Orchestra	Ravel – Daphnis et Chloé		ASV Quicksilva ASQ 6126
1991	London Symphony Orchestra	Wieniawski – Violin Concerto No. 1 Saint-Saëns – Violin Concerto No. 3	Takashi Shimizu	Platz-Nippon Columbia PLCC-550
1995	Sinfonia Helvetica	Mussorgsky/Gorchakov – Pictures at an Exhibition; Prokofiev – Romeo & Juliet (selections G. Nowak)		Sonoris SCD 5158
2000	Sinfonia Varsovia	Chopin – Piano Concerto No. 1	Stanislaw Drzewiecki; Fryderyk Nomination; Golden CD	CD Accord ACD 019-2 SE
1992	Sinfonia Helvetica	Poulenc – Sinfonietta; Ravel – Le Tombeau de Couperin, Prokofiev – Classical Symphony		Sonoris SCD 5152
1993	Sinfonia Helvetica	Stravinsky – Firebird (1919); Liszt – Les Préludes; Borodin – In the Steppes of Central Asia; Rossini – Wilhelm Tell Overture		Sonoris SCD 5153
2000	Edmonton Symphony Orchestra	Smetana – Ma Vlast (My Homeland, original 1874-75 version); Janáček – Moravian Dances		MCE 5001
1999	Sinfonia Helvetica	Schumann •Piano Concerto •Cello Concerto	Nelson Goerner, piano Wen-Sinn Yang, violoncello	SCD 5162
2003	SWR Rundfunkorchester Kaiserslautern	Leoncavallo – Der Bajazzo: Glockenchor; Weber – Der Freischütz: •Ouvertüre •Chor der Jäger •Chor der Brautjungfern; Nicolai – Die lustigen Weiber von Windsor: •Ouvertüre •Mondchor; Smetana – Die verkaufte Braut: •Tanz der Komödianten •Eingangschor; Mascagni – Cavalleria rusticana: Vorspiel und Chor der Landleute; Wagner – Der fliegende Holländer: •Matrosenchor •Chor der Spinnerinnen; Verdi – Nabucco: Gefangenchor 'Va pensiero' Bizet – Carmen: •Vorspiel •Chor der Zigarettenarbeiterinnen; Gounod – Margarethe: Chor der Soldaten; Donizetti – Don Pasquale: Dienerchor; Verdi – Der Troubadour: Zigeunerchor	Staatschor der Republik Lettland 'Latvija'	Bodensee-Festival BSF 03/1-2
2003	SWR Rundfunkorchester Kaiserslautern	Kodály – Tänze aus Galánta		hänssler CLASSIC
2003	SWR Rundfunkorchester Kaiserslautern	Hindemith – Tuttifäntchen		BBC MUSIC VOL. 12 NO. 4
1998	SWR Rundfunkorchester Kaiserslautern	Chopin – Andante Spianato und Grande Polonaise Es-Dur op. 22; Karol Szymanowski – Lied der Roxana aus der Oper 'König Roger'; Karol Szymanowski – Ballett 'Harnasie' – Tanz der Bergbauern; Lutosławski – Kleine Suite für Orchester: Fujarka, Tanz	Ewa Kupiec	Bodensee-Festival BSF 98/1-2
2004	Sinfonia Varsovia	Wieniawski – Violin Concerto No. 2	Bartek Niziol	TMHW 1001
1992	Sinfonia Helvetica	Rossini – Overture La scala di Seta; Tchaikovsky – Rococo Variations; Mozart – Die Entführung: 'Wer ein Liebchen hat gefunden' Mozart – Le Nozze di Figaro: 'Se vuol ballare' Mozart – Die Zauberflöte: 'In diesen heil'gen Hallen'; Debussy – Danse sacrée et profane J.S. Bach – Concerto for 2 Violins; Mozart – 'Exsultate, Jubilate'	Juliana Gondek, soprano Marie-Pierre Langlamet, harp Yuzuko Horigome & Barbara Gorzynska, violins Marek Gasztecki, bass Leonid Gorokhov, violoncello	Sonoris SCD 101
1993	Sinfonia Helvetica	Rossini – Overture L'Italiana in Algeri; Mozart – Die Entführung us dem Serail 'Solche hergelauf'ne Laffen' (Osmin); Mozart – Don Giovanni 'Catalogue Aria' (Leporello); Vivaldi – Concerto for 4 violins in B-minor; Bellini – Aria 'Oh! quante volte' from 'I Capuleti e I Montecchi'; Mozart – Symphonia Concertante	Hideko Kobayashi, viola Naoko Okada, soprano Natalia Morozova, Jacek Klimkiewicz, Marek Kowalski, Krzysztof Wegrzyn, Robert Zimansky – violins	Sonoris SCD 103
1994	Sinfonia Helvetica	Rossini – Overture Wilhelm Tell; J.S.Bach – Brandenburg Concerto No. 4 Vivaldi – Concerto for 4 Violins; Mozart – La Clemenza di Tito: 'Parto, Parto'; Dvořák – Polonaise; Mozart – Die Zauberflütte 'O Isis und Osiris'; Verdi – Simon Boccanegra: 'Il Lacerato Spirito'; Wieniawski – Faust Fantasy	Helene Schneiderman, mezzo-soprano Marek Gasztecki, bass Wen-Sinn Yang, violoncello Krzysztof Baranowski, Piotr Milewski, Bartlomiej Niziol, Krzysztof Plawner, Jan Stanienda – violins	Sonoris SCD 105
1995	Sinfonia Helvetica	Bizet – Carmen: Habanera; Bizet – Carmen: Seguidilla; Glazunov – Violin Concerto in A Minor, Op. 82; Tchaikowsky – Eugene Onegin: Aria of Prinz Gremin; Verdi – Don Carlos: Aria of Philip; Wagner – Tristan und Isolde: Prelude & Lovedeath	Helene Schneiderman, mezzo-soprano Marek Gasztecki, bass Piotr Milewski, violin	Sonoris SCD 107
1996	Sinfonia Helvetica	Rossini – Il Barbiere di Siviglia Overture; Vivaldi – 4 Seasons: Winter; Mozart – "Ch'io mi scordi di te?" Fauré – Flute Fantasy; J.S. Bach – Andante from Suite for solo violin Saint-Saëns – Havanaise; Richard Strauss – Serenade op. 11; Rossini – Cenerentola Overture	Pierre Amoyal, Bartlomiej Niziol, Jan Stanienda – violins Jane Irwin, mezzo-soprano Stphane Réty, flute	Sonoris SCD 108
1998	Sinfonia Helvetica	Vivaldi – Concerto pour 2 violons en la mineur Janáček – Sonate pour violon et piano Saint-Saëns – Morceau de Concert; Sarasate – Navarra; Rachmaninov – Piano Concerto No. 2, op. 18	piano: Pascal Rogé, François Killian violins: Akiko Tanaka, Marek Kowalski, Jan Stanienda, Radosław Szulc; Hervé Joulain, French horn	Sonoris SCD 109
1999	Sinfonia Helvetica	Mozart – The Impresario Overture, K. 486; J.S. Bach – Concerto for oboe and violin, BWV 1060; Vivaldi – Concerto for two violoncellos in G Minor; Mozart – Horn Concerto No. 3 in E flat Major, K. 447; Bottesini – Grand Duo Concertante	Bartek Niziol & Radosław Szulc, violin Birgit Welpmann, oboe Lidia Grzanka-Urbaniak & Stefan Rieckhoff, violoncellos Piotr Stefaniak, contrabass Hervé Joulain, co	Sonoris SCD 110
1996	Sinfonia Varsovia	Wieniawski – Violin Concerto No. 1 in F sharp Minor; Wieniawski – Violin Concerto No. 2 in D Minor	Piotr Plawner & Bartek Niziol	Henryk Wieniawski Society
1994	Sinfonia Helvetica & Deutsches Kammerorchester	Dvořák: •Cello Concerto in B-minor, Op. 104 • Polonaise A-Dur, B. 94 •Silent Woods, Op. 68, No. 5 •Rondo g-moll, Op. 94	Wen-Sinn Yang	Sonoris SCD 5154
1996	POZNAN PHILHARMONIC	Lalo – Spanish Symphony; Wieniawski – Violin Concerto No. 1	Akiko Tanaka; Reiko Otan	TMHW 1996–2
1984	Biel Symphony Orchestra	Haydn – Symphony No. 92 'Oxford'		Suisa MH CD 75.2
1986	Biel Symphony Orchestra	Shostakovich – Cello Concerto No. 1	Wen-Sinn Yang	Suisa MH CD 77.2
1987	Biel Symphony Orchestra	Martin – Ballade for Viola & Orchestra; Haug – Trumpet Concerto	Ole Edvard Antonsen, trumpet Hong-Mei Xiao, viola	Suisa MH CD 70.2
2001	Hammerhead Consort	Orff – Carmina Burana	Aleksandra Kurzak; Marek Gasztecki; Calgary Girls Choir	Suisa MH CD 70.2
1984	Biel Symphony Orchestra	Martin – Athalie Overture; Haydn – Symphonie No. 92 'Oxford'		Suisa MH SE-8
1983	Bowling Green Philharmonia	Francesconi – Viaggiatore Insonne		Access S-10

- Cultural offices
  Preceded by Uri Mayer	Music Directors, Edmonton Symphony Orchestra; 1994-2002	Succeeded by William Eddins
