= Heppner =

Heppner may refer to:

- Heppner (surname)
- Heppner, Oregon
- Heppner, South Dakota
- Heppner National Forest, in northeast Oregon

== See also ==
- Oregon Route 74, a.k.a. Heppner Highway No. 52
- Oregon Route 206, a.k.a. Wasco-Heppner Highway No. 300
- Oregon Route 207, containing the Heppner-Spray Highway No. 321
