= Pierre Hétu =

Canadian politician (1936–1998)

Pierre Hétu and family

Pierre Hétu's brothers and sister

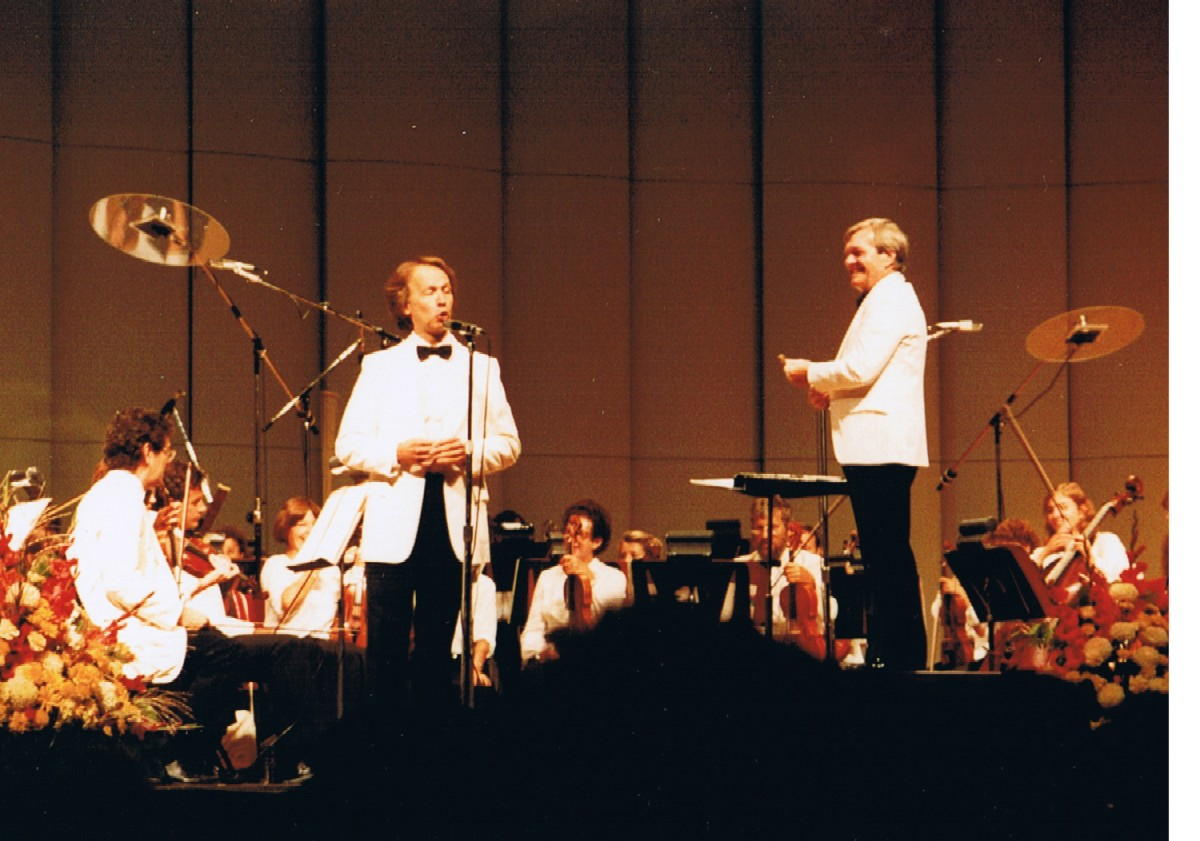
Pierre Hétu conducting Baritone Claude Corbeil

Pierre Hétu (April 22, 1936 in Montreal – December 3, 1998 in Montreal) was a conductor and pianist. He studied music from 1955–57 at the Conservatoire de musique du Québec à Montréal with Germaine Malépart (piano) and at the University of Montreal with Jean Papineau-Couture (acoustics), Gabriel Cusson and Conrad Letendre (harmony and counterpoint) and Jean Vallerand (music history).

== Life ==
Awarded a Quebec government grant, he studied in Paris 1958–62 with Marcel Ciampi (piano) and Edouard Lindenberg (conducting) and 1960–62 at the Paris Conservatoire with Louis Fourestier.

In 1960 in Paris, with Gail Grimstead (flute) and Jacques Simard (oboe), he founded the "Trio canadien"; it toured 1962–63 for the JMC, giving the premiere of André Prévost's "Triptyque".

In 1961 he placed first over 34 candidates in the 'professional graduate' category of the International Competition for Young Conductors of Besançon. He continued his training in conducting during summer sessions, notably under Sergiu Celibidache in Siena, Italy, 1959–61, under Charles Munch in Tanglewood in the summer of 1962, under Jean Martinon in Düsseldorf in the summer of 1964, and under Hans Swarowsky in Vienna 1964–65.

Hétu made his Canadian debut in 1963, conducting the Montreal Symphony Orchestra in a concert organized by the JMC. Claude Gingras described this debut in Montreal's La Presse (6 March 1963): 'You do not become a conductor, you are born one, and I think it can be said that Pierre Hétu is a born conductor.'

Appointed assistant to Zubin Mehta, the MSO's artistic director, Hétu was responsible for conducting the Matinées symphoniques; he held the position until 1968. He premiered André Prévost's Fantasmes in November 1963 with the MSO and Maurice Dela'sProjection in 1967. He also conducted Prévost's Terre des hommes during the opening of the World Festival of Expo 67. He was music director 1968–72 of the Kalamazoo Symphony Orchestra in Michigan, combining that responsibility with the job of associate conductor 1970–73 of the Detroit Symphony Orchestra. He was artistic director 1973–80 of the Edmonton Symphony Orchestra. He was absent from the podium for several months in 1977 due to a heart attack.

Commenting on a performance of Shostakovitch's Symphony No. 10, a work which 'can only be sustained by a conductor possessing authority, panache, and an intuitive feel for the music,' Gilles Potvin wrote: 'Hétu literally propelled the MSO to a grandiose and spacious performance, with an inspirational sweep that did not let up for a single moment and called to mind a Kondrashin or a Mravinsky' (Montreal Le Devoir 30 January 1975).

A guest conductor in Canada and abroad, during the opening concert of the 1976 Olympics he conducted the JM World Orchestra, which he also conducted at the Orford Arts Centre and in Quebec City. In 1977 he led the Nouvel orchestre philharmonique de Paris in works by Jacques Hétu, Matton, and Prévost (see Musicanada). Also in 1977 he was awarded the Canadian Music Council prize for his conducting of Strauss' Salome. He led the Brussels, Lausanne, and Strasbourg orchestras in Europe, and conducted many operas, mainly for the Théâtre lyrique de Nouvelle-France, the COC, the Opéra du Québec, the Calgary Opera, the Edmonton Opera, and the Vancouver Opera.

From 1991 to 1994, he taught conducting at the University of Toronto where he also conducted the University of Toronto Symphony Orchestra. His final performances were in October 1998 conducting Samson et Dalila by Saint-Saëns in New Orleans.

Hétu conducted Canada's leading orchestras and took part in CBC radio and TV recordings during the 1980s. He taught conducting and was a jury member in national and international competitions. From 1991–1994 he taught conducting at the University of Toronto where he also conducted the University of Toronto Symphony Orchestra. He cut back appearances in the mid-1990s due to ill health, making his last appearance as conductor of Saint-Saëns' Samson et Dalila with the New Orleans Opera in October 1998.

Pierre Hétu died from cancer on December 3, 1998, in Montreal. He was married first to Carollyn Clark-Hétu and later to Michelle Rosich. His two daughters from his first marriage, Gisèle Hétu and Lorraine (Hétu) Manifold, survived him, as did his second wife.

== Electoral history ==
1988 Canadian federal election: Châteauguay
Party	Candidate	Votes
Progressive Conservative	Ricardo López	22,439
Liberal	Jean-Marc Fournier	16,422
New Democratic	Pierre Hétu	8,282
Not affiliated	André Turcot	1,724
Rhinoceros	Hubert Le Tube Simon	1,250

Cultural offices
Preceded by Lawrence Leonard	Music Directors, Edmonton Symphony Orchestra; 1973–1979	Succeeded by Uri Mayer
