= The Horn of Mortal Danger =

1980 book by Lawrence Leonard

- First edition
- Author: Lawrence Leonard
- Cover artist: Gavin Rowe
- Language: English
- Genre: Science fiction
- Publisher: Julia MacRae
- Publication date: 1980
- Publication place: United Kingdom
- Pages: 224
- ISBN: 0-7445-0847-9
- OCLC: 59211869

The Horn of Mortal Danger is a 1980 novel by British musician Lawrence Leonard. It relates the adventures of a brother and sister as they discover a secret civilisation buried beneath the streets of London. It is a 'classical' children's fantasy.

== Plot summary ==
Simon ("Widgie") and Jen Widgeon are innocently exploring the abandoned Highgate rail tunnel near their home when they discover a hidden gateway halfway along it. Through this, they find their way to a little old-fashioned railway station.

At first the tunnels seem deserted. However, as Jen wanders down the tunnel to explore, the Railwaymen emerge and capture Widgie. Jen, in her turn, discovers an underground canal, complete with a little steamboat, which the railway crosses through a retractable bridge. Men emerge from the boat and take her captive.

It quickly becomes apparent that Widgie and Jen have become caught up in an entire underground civilisation, which the North London System had kept secret for centuries from the world above. Two civilisations, in fact, seemingly perpetually at war. The siblings' arrival becomes the catalyst for a climactic battle between the Railwaymen and the Canallers.

Widgie manages to escape and rescues Jen, and the realisation of the threat they pose should they escape aboveground and expose the System forces the Railwaymen and the Canallers to set aside their differences for the time being, to collaborate in an effort to recapture them. In the course of the battle giant rats, kept imprisoned in a blocked-up tunnel, are released and proceed to spread through the whole system. As Widgie and Jen escape into the Post Office Railway, it appears that the entire civilisation is on the verge of disintegration under the assault from the rats.

== Structure ==
It is worth noting that, seemingly in imitation of The Lord of the Rings (1937 and 1949). Leonard includes appendices relating the aftermath of the story underground, in which the Railwaymen and Canal Folk discuss the joint threats of the children and the rats, and giving a short history of the North London System (and suggesting that similar societies exist beneath many major cities, at least in England). It also includes two short "Interludes", set aboveground, concerning the search for the missing children.

== Allusions/references to actual history, geography and current science ==
Leonard's secondary world is unusual as a result of the fact that it overlaps with the primary one and is separated from it, it seems, through nothing stronger than blind luck. Uniquely among such fantasies, Leonard never employs magic, and indeed seems at pains to explain how his underground System works. There are no women seen underground, nor any apparent means to produce food to support the Undergrounders, but rather than hoping his readers will not notice this (as the children do), he explains very concisely the why and how of this in a throwaway manner near the beginning.

The technology of railways and canals is borrowed from observation of the Aboveground world, but the System is conservative and usually does not adopt new things very quickly. They have no electricity, though the Railway is reportedly looking into the matter. The children finally make their escape through an Observation Shaft, similar to the one they entered through, which leads into the Post Office Railway, and is used to study the operation of electric trains.

In the story, the System had existed for centuries before the Tube, and it is mentioned in the second Appendix that the beginning of construction of the Tube caused the Undergrounders considerable alarm, although tempered by pride that the Abovegrounders were (seemingly) imitating them for a change.

The key clue to the location of the System is the River Fleet, diverted underground in the eighteenth century. It serves as the spine of the canal network and the setting for one of the most dramatic scenes in the book, as both the train (with Widgie on board) and the boat (with Jen) race against time to reach and pass a bridge over it as the river becomes swollen and flooded.

Several locations (King's Cross, Paddington, Camden Lock) are named after real-world locations, and it appears from the map in the book that these are intended to be very near their real-world locations: the System incorporates the area roughly bounded on the surface by Muswell Hill to the north, Tottenham and Islington to the east, Paddington and Oxford Street to the south and Finchley Road to the west. The southern part of this area includes the River Fleet, which drains southwards into the Thames.
