= Heppner (surname) =

Heppner is a surname.

== Notable surnames ==
- Ben Heppner (born 1956), tenor
- Ben Heppner (politician) (1943–2006), politician
- Jens Heppner (born 1964), bicycle racer
- Kris Heppner (born 1977), footballer
- Mikey Heppner, guitarist
- Nancy Heppner (born 1971), politician
- Peter Heppner (born 1967), singer

== Fictional characters ==
- Timothy Heppner, fictional character in Andrew Unger's novel Once Removed

== See also ==
- Hepner
