= Allan Gordon Bell =

Canadian contemporary classical composer

Allan Gordon Bell, CM (born 24 May 1953) is a Canadian contemporary classical composer.

== Career ==
Born in Calgary, Alberta, Bell received a Master of Music degree from the University of Alberta where he studied with Violet Archer, Malcolm Forsyth, and Manus Sasonkin, after completing undergraduate studies in philosophy. He also did advanced studies in composition at the Banff Centre for the Arts where his teachers were Jean Coulthard, Bruce Mather, and Oskar Morawetz. He has created works for solo instruments, chamber ensembles, orchestra, band, and electroacoustic media.

Bell is an Associate Composer of the Canadian Music Centre, for which he served as President of the National Board from 1984 to 1988. From 1978 to 1980, and from 1985 to the present, he has been a professor of composition and music theory at the University of Calgary, where he helped to create the Department of Music's doctoral programme. He served on the jury of the 2002 SOCAN Awards for Young Composers and was a composer-in-residence at the 2001 Cantai Festival in Taiwan.

In the works of Bell one can hear the influences of prairie cultures and scenes and the sounds of nature, which he illustrates with orchestration. In 2004 he received a transplant that halted a serious liver condition; today he actively works in academia and continues to compose.

== Recognition ==
In 2012, for his contribution to Canadian contemporary classical music and culture, Bell was made a Member of the Order of Canada. Previously, The Association of Canadian Choral Conductors had presented him with an award for outstanding choral compositions (in 1994 and again in 1999). He has also been the recipient of numerous teaching excellence awards.

In 2014, Bell received a Juno Award for his Field Notes in the Classical Composition of the Year category.

== Music ==
Bell's works have been performed by the National Arts Centre Orchestra, Calgary Philharmonic Orchestra, Esprit Orchestra, the Vancouver Symphony Orchestra, the Manitoba Chamber Orchestra, the Edmonton Symphony Orchestra the Orford String Quartet, the Purcell String Quartet, the ensembles of Toronto New Music Concerts, Arraymusic and the Société de musique contemporaine du Québec, and many other professional and amateur organizations in Canada, the United States, the United Kingdom, West Germany, Israel, and Japan.

Highlights of performance of Bell's compositions include:

- 1988 - Concerto for Two Orchestras performed at the Olympic Arts Festival
- 1989 - Arche II was performed by the finalists at the Banff International String Quartet Competition and was sent by the CBC as the English Network submission to the International Rostrum of Composers in Paris
- 1992 - An Elemental Lyric was performed at Carnegie Hall in New York, the Kennedy Centre in Washington, D.C., and Symphony Hall in Boston
- 1996 - Danse sauvage was the imposed piece for the 1996 Honens International Piano Competition
- 2001 - Turtle Wakes (chamber opera) premiered by Calgary Opera

== Works ==
- Pas de quatre for percussion ensemble, 1976
- Beltine for Violin, 1977
- Nocturne for soprano and piano, 1977
- Prelude and Passacaglia for piano, 1977
- Ark for string quartet, 1980
- Encounters for two violins and two cellos, 1980
- Five Rituals for flute, oboe, clarinet, horn, bassoon and two drums, 1980
- Morning Music: A Reflection upon Stillness for Violin and Piano, 1980
- Dynamus for string orchestra, 1980
- Kinesis for speaker, two pianos and two percussion, 1981
- Drawing down the Moon for string orchestra, 1982
- Mistaya for two drums, 1982
- Monashee: Three Lyric Sketches for Cello and Piano, 1982
- From Chaos to the Birth of a Dancing Star Band, 1983
- Concerto for Percussion and Orchestra, 1984
- The Gift of the Wolf, music theater for narrator, children's ensemble, violin, cello and piano, 1984
- Gaia for flute, oboe, clarinet, four cellos, piano and two percussion, 1984
- The Ugly Duckling, musical theater for female voice, flute, violin and piano, 1985
- In the Eye of the Four Winds Concert Band, 1986
- At Enchantment for Cello and Piano, 1986
- Prairie for synthesizers and computers, 1986
- Innua: Three Masks for Violin, Cello and Piano, 1987
- The Ascendant Voice for wind ensemble, 1988
- Concerto for Two Orchestras, 1988
- Prairie II for synthesizers, digital samplers and computers, 1988
- Sonora Borealis for piano, 1989
- Vision Quest for band, 1989
- Ark II for String Quartet, 1989
- Orca for nine players, 1989
- Lumen: A Quintet for Two Violins, Two Violas and Cello, 1990
- Moon of Flowers for synthesizers, digital samplers and computers, 1990
- A Prairie Requiem for clarinet, harp and marimba, 1991
- At Elemental Lyric, 1992
- Old Coyote's Saturday Night for piano, 1992
- Snow - More Snow - Snow for bass clarinet, cello and marimba, 1993
- Grassi Lakes Four Seasons for children's choir and piano, 1993
- Aurages: Seven Ephemera for Flute, Violin, Viola, Cello and Double Bass, 1994
- Spirit Trail, 1994
- Ark III for violin, percussion and string orchestra, 1994
- Shadows, Echoes, impressions for digital samplers and computers, 1994
- Animus for alto saxophone, percussion and string orchestra, 1995
- Nebulae for piano, 1995
- Danse sauvage for piano, 1996
- Sweetgrass for flute, clarinet, violin, cello, piano and percussion, 1997
- Chthonic Canons for three tubas, 1998
- Sundogs Reel for string orchestra, 1998
- Turtle Wakes - An Opera, 1998
- Two Roads to the Heartland for Children's Choir and Piano, 1998
- Chiaroscuro, 1999
- a great arch softening the mountains for voice, bass clarinet, violin, piano and Axio / soundfiles, 2001
- Symphonies of Hidden Fire, 2002
- Serenity for small orchestra, 2004
- Trails of Gravity and Grace for clarinet, cello and piano, 2003
- Festival Fanfare for horn, two trumpets, trombone and tuba
- music for Aesop's Fables (one-act play), 2013
