= Lawrence Leonard =

Lawrence Leonard (22 August 1923 – 4 January 2001) was a British conductor, cellist, composer, teacher, and writer.

== Early life and education ==
Leonard received his musical education at the Royal Academy of Music and the École Normale de Musique de Paris, and with Ernest Ansermet and Erich Kleiber. He won a French Government scholarship and went to study with Jean Fournet in Paris.

== Career ==
His musical career began at age 16, first as a cellist in the Sadler's Wells Opera orchestra, then in the London Symphony Orchestra, playing under such conductors as Sir Henry Wood, Richard Strauss, and Leopold Stokowski.

In 1947 became Associate Conductor of the BBC Northern Orchestra, broadcasting regularly, and was also the conductor and director of the Goldsbrough Orchestra. In the 1950s and 1960s, Leonard, a close friend of cartoonist Gerard Hoffnung's, participated both as conductor and composer, in the celebrated Hoffnung concerts.

In 1959, at Leonard Bernstein's request, Leonard conducted the London premiere of West Side Story, later giving the German-language premiere in Vienna. In 1962 he conducted performances of The Yeomen of the Guard at the Tower of London during the City of London Festival, which included several traditionally cut numbers.

Leonard was Associate Conductor of the BBC Northern Orchestra and Assistant Conductor to Sir John Barbirolli at the Hallé Orchestra (1963-1968). In 1964, Leonard conducted the world premiere of Gian Carlo Menotti's chamber opera Martin's Lie, at the Bath International Music Festival. He conducted a television production of The Rise and Fall of the City of Mahagonny on BBC2 on 28 February 1965.

From 1968 to 1973, Leonard was Music Director of the Edmonton Symphony Orchestra, where two of his orchestral compositions were premiered (an adaptation of Machaut's Grande Messe de Notre Dame in 1972 and Group Questions for Orchestra in 1973). In 1971, he conducted the Edmonton Symphony in a concert featuring the British rock band Procol Harum, which was recorded and released commercially as Procol Harum Live: In Concert with the Edmonton Symphony Orchestra, although due to an apparent distaste for rock music, from the start of the project Leonard disowned any association with the performance and went so far as to refuse to have his name listed in the credits. The concert and resulting recording went on to become the most successful live pairing of symphony orchestra and rock music to date and a worldwide best-seller, and even spawned a hit single, "Conquistador".

In 1977, he arranged Mussorgsky’s Pictures at an Exhibition for piano and orchestra. The world premiere recording of this, recorded in 1992 at All Hallows Church, Gospel Oak, London was released on the Cala label that year. It featured Tamás Ungár, piano, and the Philharmonia conducted by Geoffrey Simon.

In later years, he was Professor of Conducting at the Guildhall School of Music and Drama and Morley College, and regularly conducted the Royal Academy of Music Chamber Orchestra.

== Original orchestral compositions ==
In addition to the aforementioned adaptation of Machaut's Grande Messe de Notre Dame (1972) and Group Questions for Orchestra (1973), Leonard's original orchestral compositions include: Break, Processional, A Short Overture, A Swaying Tune (for school orchestra winds) Four Pieces, Four Contrasts and the symphonic poem Mezoon (written for the Sultan of Oman).

== Books ==
Leonard wrote The Horn of Mortal Danger (1980), a children's adventure tale set in a secret civilisation underneath London. It was a 'completely new departure' from anything he had done before.

He also authored the irreverent yet insightful book 1812 and All That: A Concise History of Music from 30,000BC to the Millennium.

- Cultural offices
  Preceded by Brian Priestman	Music Directors, Edmonton Symphony Orchestra; 1968–1973	Succeeded by Pierre Hétu
