= Joanna Kozłowska =

Polish opera singer (born 1959)

Joanna Kozłowska-Szczepaniak (born 1959 in Poznań) is a Polish opera singer (soprano).

== Life and career ==
Kozłowska went to Poznań School of Music which is named after the Polish composer Mieczysław Karłowicz where she studied cello and piano. After graduating from high school she studied singing at the Ignacy Jan Paderewski Academy of Music still in her hometown. She participated in the master classes of Hanne-Lore Kuhse in 1985 in Weimar and the following year with Elisabeth Schwarzkopf in Zürich.

She first gained international attention by winning the first prize at the Benson and Hedges International Voice Competition in London, which was followed by winning second prize at the International Vocal Competition in Rio de Janeiro. Early on she got a long-term contract with The Grand Theatre in her home town Poznań to which she was closely linked from 1984 to 1998. Already in January 1986 her international career started and she debuted as Liù at the Royal Opera House, Covent Garden, and thereafter sung at the most prestigious opera houses of Europa and America. In Italy she performed at Teatro alla Scala in Milan, at Teatro La Fenice in Venice and at the Maggio Musicale Fiorentino, in Austria at the Graz Opera and at the Vienna State Opera, in Germany at the Bavarian State Opera of Munich, at the Hamburg State Opera and at the Deutsche Oper in Berlin, in Paris at the Théâtre du Châtelet, in Geneva at the Grand Théâtre, in Brussels at the Théâtre de la Monnaie and in Buenos Aires at the Teatro Colón. In the United States she earned high acclaim as Sandrina in Mozart's La finta giardiniera at the Brooklyn Academy of Music, as Donna Elvira at the Los Angeles Opera and as Alice Ford in a concert version with the Minnesota Orchestra under Jeffrey Tate. At the Atlanta Opera she stunned both public and press alike in the title role of Puccini's Madama Butterfly.

In 1992 she interpreted successfully the role of Sandrina in La finta giardiniera at the Salzburg Festival, directed by Ursel and Karl-Ernst Herrmann. A long-term commitment bound the singer also to Oper Zürich in Switzerland where she was seen and heard as Ariadne, Emma, Lisa, Mimi and Tamara as well as in four leading Verdi-roles, the two Leonoras, as Elvira in Ernani and Elisabetta in Don Carlos.

Besides her operatic work the singer performed in several oratorios and cantatas, including Musikverein in Vienna, Salle Pleyel in Paris, the Tonhalle in Zürich, Davies Hall in San Francisco, the Warsaw Philharmonic and the Konzerthaus in Berlin. Her concert repertoire includes Henryk Górecki's Symphony of Sorrowful Songs which she recorded to high acclaim with the Warsaw National Philharmonic Orchestra conducted by Kazimierz Kord in 1994. Kozłowska interpreted Strauss' Vier letzte Lieder, Mahler's second and fourth as well as Rachmaninoff's The Bells. She also sung the soprano parts in Mozart's Requiem, Poulenc's Gloria and Britten's War Requiem. In the US she has performed with the San Francisco Symphony, with the Grand Rapids Symphony and at the Grant Park Music Festival in Chicago.

Conductors with whom she has worked include Sylvain Cambreling, James Conlon, Vladimir Fedoseyev, Lawrence Foster, David Lockington, Lorin Maazel, Riccardo Muti, Grzegorz Nowak, Carlo Rizzi, Nello Santi, Marcello Viotti, Antoni Wit and David Zinman.

In 2007, while still performing, Kozłowska began teaching at the Music Academy of Poznan. In February 2013, she achieved a Doctorate and was named assistant professor in the discipline of vocal arts at the Fryderyk Chopin University of Music in Warsaw.

== Repertoire ==
Beethoven:

- Marcelline in Fidelio

Bizet:

- Micaëla in Carmen

Gluck:

- Euridice in Orfeo ed Euridice

Leoncavallo:

- Nedda in Pagliacci

Mozart:

- Sandrina in La finta giardiniera
- Ilia in Idomeneo
- Donna Elvira in Don Giovanni
- Contessa in Le nozze di Figaro
- Pamina in Die Zauberflöte

Puccini:

- Mimì in La bohème
- Cio-Cio-San in Madama Butterfly
- Giorgetta in Il tabarro
- Lauretta in Gianni Schicchi
- Liù in Turandot

Rubinstein:

- Tamara in Der Dämon

Schubert:

- Emma in Fierrabras

Richard Strauss:

- Title role in Ariadne auf Naxos

Tchaikovsky:

- Tatjana in Eugene Onegin
- Lisa in The Queen of Spades

Verdi:

- Elvira in Ernani
- Annina in La traviata
- Leonora in Il trovatore
- Amelia in Un ballo in maschera
- Leonora in La forza del destino
- Elisabetta in Don Carlos
- Title role in Aida
- Desdemona in Otello
- Alice Ford in Falstaff
