= Brian Priestman =

British conductor

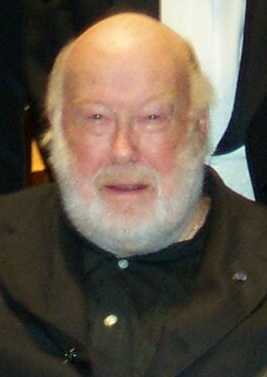
Brian Priestman in 2003

Brian Priestman (10 February 1927 – 18 April 2014) was a British conductor and music educator.

== Biography ==
Priestman was born in Birmingham, England. He studied at the University of Birmingham (BMus Music; MA Music, 1952) and the Royal Conservatory of Brussels, Belgium.

He founded and was principal conductor of the Opera da Camera and the Orchestra da Camera in Birmingham, and Music Director of the Royal Shakespeare Theatre at Stratford-upon-Avon (1960–1963). He was Music Director of the Edmonton Symphony Orchestra (1964–1968), Music Director of the Handel Society of New York (1966–1970), Resident Conductor of the Baltimore Symphony Orchestra (1968–1970), Music Director of the Denver Symphony Orchestra (1970–1978), Principal Conductor of the New Zealand National Orchestra (1973–1976), Music Director of the Florida Philharmonic (1977–1980), Principal Conductor of the Cape Town Symphony (1980–1986), and Principal Guest Conductor of the Malmö Symphony Orchestra (1988–1990). His final performances as conductor took place in Edmonton in October 2003.

As a guest conductor he appeared with all the major British orchestras, including more than 300 concerts for the BBC, with orchestras in Australia, Hong Kong, Southern Africa, and all the major orchestras of Scandinavia, Belgium etc. etc. He founded the New York Handel Opera Society and appeared frequently at the Mostly Mozart concerts there as well as for seven years at the Aspen Music Festival and seven at the Grant Park, Chicago, Festival. He recorded for RCA and Westminster Records, including the first complete operas of Handel for the latter.

As an academic he was Dean of the Faculty of Music and Professor at the University of Cape Town (1980–1986) and Artist-in-residence at the University of Kansas (1992–2002) and for three years was Music Director of the National Youth Orchestra of Canada (1967–1969).

Priestman wrote articles in music periodicals and encyclopedias including the New Grove Encyclopedia, Musik in Geschichte und Gegenwart, Encyclopædia Britannica, and Music and Letters. He resides in France.

He was awarded honorary doctorates from Regis University, Denver, and the University of Colorado. He was awarded the Golden Lyre by the American Institute of High Fidelity for services to music in the United States.

On 18 April 2014, he died at his home in Broze, France.

- Cultural offices
  Preceded by Lee Hepner	Music Directors, Edmonton Symphony Orchestra; 1964–1968	Succeeded by Lawrence Leonard
