= Uri Mayer =

Romanian-born Canadian violist and conductor

Uri Mayer (born August 4, 1946, in Târgu Mureș, Romania) is a Romanian-born Canadian violist and conductor.

Mayer moved to Israel at a young age, and studied at the Conservatory of Music of Tel-Aviv and the University of Tel-Aviv. His conducting debut took place in 1964 while he was still in high school.

He was Assistant Conductor of the National Youth Orchestra of Israel (1964–1970), and was a member of the Israel Philharmonic (1967–1968). After winning a scholarship in 1968, he moved to New York City to study with Jean Morel at the Juilliard School. He was Assistant Conductor of the New York Youth Symphony and principal violist with Leopold Stokowski’s American Symphony Orchestra. In 1970, he became assistant principal violist of the Montreal Symphony Orchestra, and in 1980, he became Associate Conductor.

From 1981 to 1994, Mayer was Music Director of the Edmonton Symphony Orchestra. He was also Principal Conductor of Orchestra London (1988–1994), Artistic Adviser to The Israel Sinfonietta Beersheba (1991–1999), and Principal Conductor of Kansai Philharmonic (1994–2000).

Mayer currently resides in Toronto where he is a Professor and Director of Orchestral Studies at the University of Toronto after previously serving as Resident Conductor of the Royal Conservatory Orchestra.

Cultural offices
Preceded by Pierre Hétu	Music Directors, Edmonton Symphony Orchestra; 1981–1994	Succeeded by Grzegorz Nowak
