= Winspear Centre =

Performing arts venue in Edmonton, Canada

Francis Winspear Centre for Music
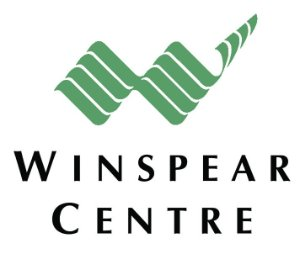

- Exterior view of the venue (c.2026)
- Interactive map of Francis Winspear Centre for Music
- Address: 4 Sir Winston Churchill Square NW; Edmonton, Alberta; T5J 4X8
- Coordinates: 53°32′38″N 113°29′15″W
- Owner: City of Edmonton
- Operator: Edmonton Concert Hall Foundation
- Capacity: 1,716
- Type: Performing arts centre
- Public transit: Churchill station

Construction
- Groundbreaking: 1995
- Opened: September 12, 1997
- Cost: CA$45 million ($84.3 million in 2025 dollars)
- Architect: Cohos Evamy Partners

Tenant
- Edmonton Symphony Orchestra

Website
- www.winspearcentre.com

The Francis Winspear Centre for Music is a performing arts centre located in the downtown core of Edmonton, Alberta, Canada. Opened in 1997, it is the home of the Edmonton Symphony Orchestra. The centre is named after Francis G. Winspear, who donated $6 million ($11.1 million today) to the construction of the facility - the single largest private donation to a performing arts facility in Canadian history.

== Construction and specs ==
In addition to the donation from Winspear, the Canadian federal government and Alberta provincial government contributed an additional $15 million each ($27.7 million each, today) towards its construction.

The concert hall has a seating capacity of 1,668 people and when seating is available in the choir loft above the main stage area the hall can hold up to 1,884. The hall is a tall, rectangular room with stepped, curved balconies and terraces. With its parallel side walls, the Winspear represents a modern adaptation of the classic "shoebox" shaped concert halls of the late 19th and early 20th centuries.

In 2002, the Davis Concert Organ was installed at the centre. Launched at a sold-out performance on September 14, 2002, the pipe organ was built by Orgues Létourneau Limitée of Saint-Hyacinthe, Quebec. It has 96 stops, 122 ranks, and 6,551 pipes. It is named after Stuart Davis, to acknowledge his generosity and also in memory of his late wife Winona.

In 2009, with support from the City, planning began for the expansion and launched a capital campaign in spring of 2020. The Winspear Project is multi-faceted and includes a 41,000 square foot expansion, refresh and renewal of existing spaces, and space to house a YMCA daycare and parkade. As part of the funding strategy, they are engaging the public in a community capital campaign of $17M.

The Winspear Project will feature a 550-seat flex-use midsize acoustic hall, childcare centre, underground and surface-level parking, multifunctional spaces, and commercial space. This project will become the home base for the community programming offered through the Tommy Banks Centre and allow increased capacity for programming, outreach, and partnership with sister arts organizations and business partners.

== Acoustics ==
The acoustics of the Winspear are adjustable through the use of velour banners and curtains. These can be used to control the reverberant characteristics for musical events that require a less reverberant environment, or for orchestra rehearsals when the presence of a full audience needs to be approximated. An adjustable canopy system balances the clarity and reverberance of performances, helps control the loudness of the sound, and - in conjunction with the curved acoustic reflectors - assists in cross-stage communication among musicians.

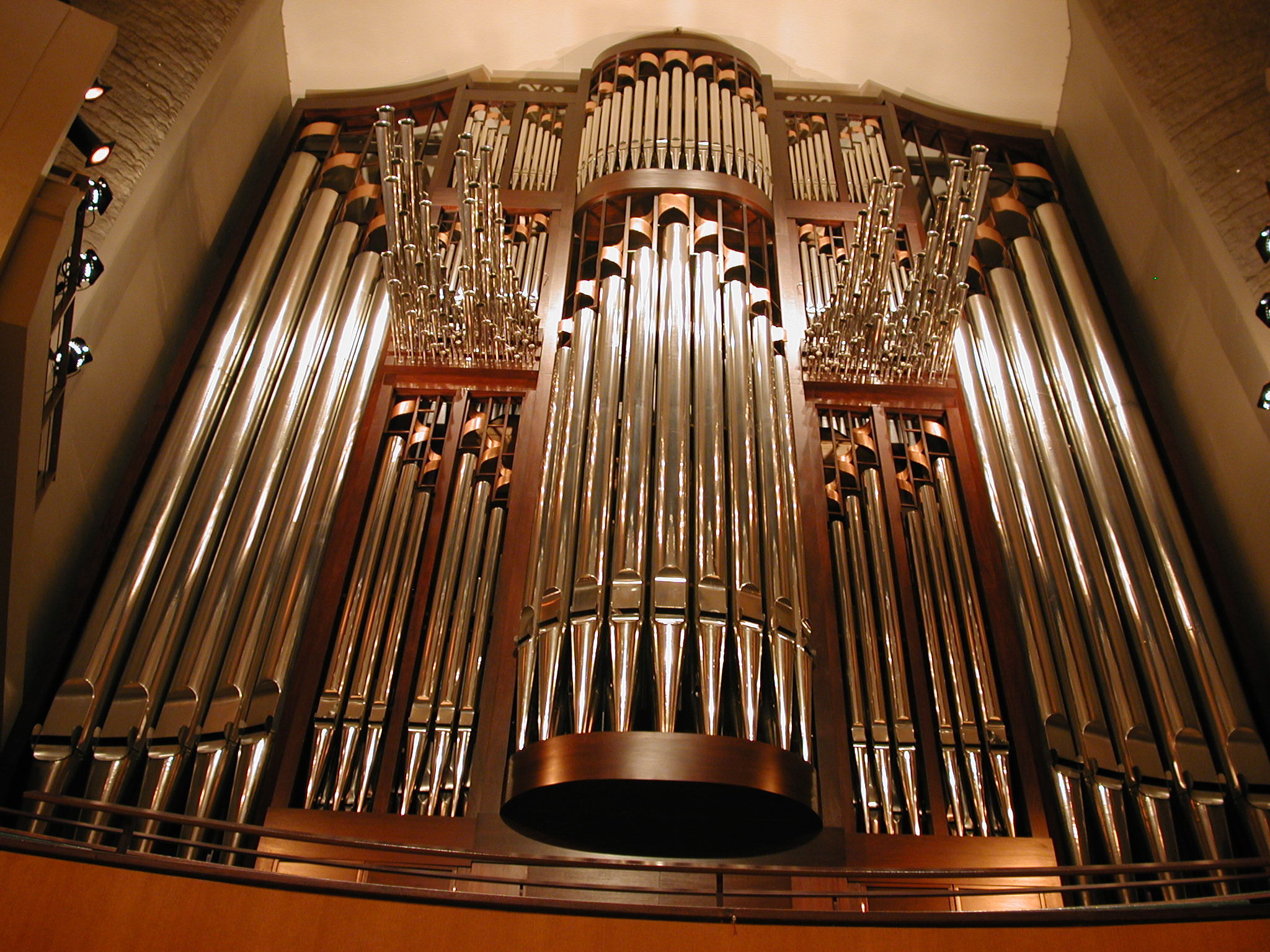
The Davis Concert Organ

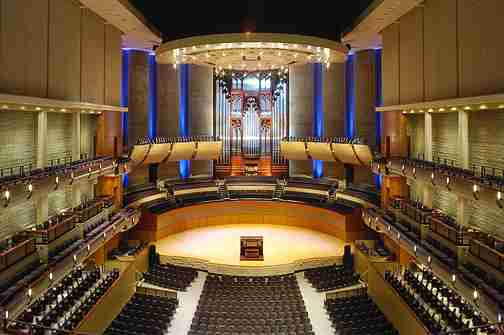
The Winspear Centre Performance Chamber

== See also ==
- List of concert halls
