= David Hoyt (conductor) =

Canadian horn player and conductor

David Hoyt is a Canadian horn player and conductor.

He studied piano (with Boris Roubakine, Karl Engel, and Alexandra Munn), French horn (with Philip Farkas, Pierre del Vescovo, and Eugene Rittich), and conducting (with Franco Mannino, Kurt Sanderling, and Pierre Boulez). In 1975, while a student at the University of Alberta, he became Principal Horn of the Edmonton Symphony Orchestra.

Hoyt began conducting professionally in 1982, and in 1985 became resident guest conductor of the Edmonton Symphony. In 2002–2003, he served as the orchestra's Artistic Director. Hoyt has taught at festivals and schools across Canada. He was Artistic Director/Executive Director of Music & Sound at the Banff Centre in 2004–2005.
