= Tom Rolston =

Canadian classical musician

Thomas Rolston (born October 31, 1932, in Vancouver, British Columbia - died May 29, 2010, in Vancouver, British Columbia) was a Canadian violinist and conductor.

After early studies with Douglas Stewart, Roman Totenberg and David Martin, Rolston was a member of the Philharmonia Orchestra (1951–1958). He was concertmaster and (1958–1960) and Associate Conductor (1960–1964) of the Edmonton Symphony Orchestra. He taught at the University of Alberta in Edmonton until 1979, when he became the first director of music at the Banff Centre for the Arts and where he was head of the string department as well as both the centre's music co-ordinator and music director, overseeing the centre's summer programs until his retirement in 2004. He created the Canadian Chamber Orchestra, introduced the Suzuki method of violin instruction to Canada, and founded the Society for Talent Education in 1964. Between 1988 and 1991, he taught at the University of Calgary.
