= David B. Hoyt =

American surgeon & medical professional

- Education: Case Western Reserve University
- Occupation: Executive Director of the American College of Surgeons
- Medical career
- Awards: American College of Surgeons Distinguished Service Award (2007)

David B. Hoyt is an American surgeon who is the Past Executive Director of the American College of Surgeons. His tenure ended on Jan 1, 2022.

== Education ==
Hoyt obtained his medical degree from Case Western Reserve University School of Medicine in Cleveland in 1976.

== Career ==
Hoyt spent his entire medical training career at the University of California San Diego School of Medicine, completing his internship in 1977, his residency in 1979, a research fellowship in 1980, and two years as senior and chief resident from 1982 to 1984. He remained at UCSD after his training as an assistant professor of surgery between 1984 and 1989, associate professor of surgery between 1989 and 1995, and professor of surgery from 1995 to 2006.

Hoyt served as the director of the division of trauma, burns, and critical care at the UC San Diego Medical Center from 1989 to 2006. While at UCSD, he was also the Monroe E. Trout Professor of Surgery and vice-chairman of the department of surgery, and had a dual appointment on the staff at the Veterans Administration Medical Center in San Diego and at Thornton Hospital in La Jolla. While in San Diego, Hoyt was active in the San Diego/Imperial County Credentials Committee, with which his involvement lasted 12 years.

In 2006, he moved to the University of California, Irvine School of Medicine to serve as chairman of the department of surgery, the executive vice-dean of the school of medicine, and the John E. Connolly professor of surgery. He was also the medical director of the college's trauma programs while at UCI before he assumed his position at the ACS.

== American College of Surgeons ==
Previous to succeeding Thomas R. Russell and assuming his position as the executive director of the American College of Surgeons on January 1, 2010, Hoyt served the organization in a number of ways. He became a Fellow of the American College of Surgeons in 1987, at which point he became involved in leading various ACS activities. Hoyt first became involved with the Committee on Trauma in 1980, and served as its chair between 1998 and 2002. Hoyt was a member of various ACS Board of Governors' Committees: Blood-Borne Infection and Environmental Risk, the Program Committee, and the Regents' Committee on Informatics. He was also a member of the national faculty for the college's Advanced Trauma Life Support course and served as a coordinator, instructor, and eventually the director of training for ATLS.

As executive director, Hoyt has overseen the expansion of the college's Stop the Bleed Initiative as gun violence has increased in the United States.

=== Positions as executive director ===
When there was conflict over overlapping vs non-overlapping surgeries scheduled in hospitals, Hoyt supported research stating concurrent, overlapping surgeries are generally safe practice, as the ACS updated its position on its long-standing set of principles regarding the physician's responsibilities in the operating room.

He has had a focus on sexual harassment in medicine, and is overseeing the development of a multi-year study to identify and understand the cultural elements that can ultimately be controlled to reduce the prevalence of harassment. In 2011, when the president-elect of the ACS, Lazar Greenfield, was caught in a controversy surrounding a Valentine's Day editorial he wrote touting the mood-enhancing effects of semen on women during unprotected sex, Hoyt oversaw the college's response, stating that it "deeply regrets the offense taken to Dr. Greenfield’s editorial about Valentine’s Day."

When the efficacy of surgical caps were called into question by inspectors, who instead supported bouffants, Hoyt's office released its own guidelines, arguing there was no reason to tamper with tradition, and that there is no evidence linking modest amounts of uncovered hair to wound infections. He has encouraged surgeons to wear clean, appropriate professional attire (not scrubs) during all patient encounters outside of the operating room, stating, "this statement reflects our strong commitment to surgical patient safety."

On the issue of surgical volume, Hoyt reported the ACS continues to look into the issue.

In the "eyeball wars" between optometrists and ophthalmologists, ophthalmologists have maintained that optometrists do not have the same medical training or qualifications to perform eye surgery, and so, when Governor Rick Scott signed HB 239 into law in 2013, allowing optometrists to prescribe a limited number of oral medications, ophthalmologists were angry. Hoyt sent a letter of protest to Rep. Cary Pigman, an emergency care physician who chairs the Health Quality Subcommittee, explaining that the bill worked against the interests of patient safety and maintaining the highest standards of surgical care.
