= Fred Hepner =

Australian rules footballer (born 1940)

Personal information
- Full name: Frederick William Neil Hepner
- Born: 14 February 1940
- Died: 31 May 2022 (aged 82)
- Original team: Crib Point
- Height: 163 cm (5 ft 4 in)
- Weight: 73 kg (161 lb)
- Position: rover

Playing career
Years	Club	Games (Goals)
1956	Flinders	unknown
1958	Crib Point	unknown
1960	South Melbourne	3 snr (unknown res)
1961–62	Frankston (VFA)	unknown
1962–67	East Gambier (Sth Aust)	unknown
1967–68	Frankston Rovers	unknown
1969–70	Sorrento	28 (tba)

Career highlights
- Premierships 1956,1958,1961,1965,1969; MPFL runner up B&F 1968 and 1971; Frankston VAFA Chairman of Selectors

Frederick William Neil Hepner (14 February 1940 – 31 May 2022) was an Australian rules footballer who played with South Melbourne in the Victorian Football League (VFL).
