= Violet Archer =

Canadian composer, pianist, organist, and percussionist (1913 - 2000)

- Born: 24 April 1913; Montreal, Quebec, Canada
- Died: 21 February 2000 (aged 86); Ottawa, Ontario, Canada
- Education: McGill University, B.Mus., 1936; Yale University, M.Mus., 1949
- Occupations: Composer, teacher, pianist, organist, percussionist
- Awards: Order of Canada, 1983

Violet Archer CM (24 April 1913 – 21 February 2000) was a Canadian composer, teacher, pianist, organist, and percussionist.

== Education and teaching career ==
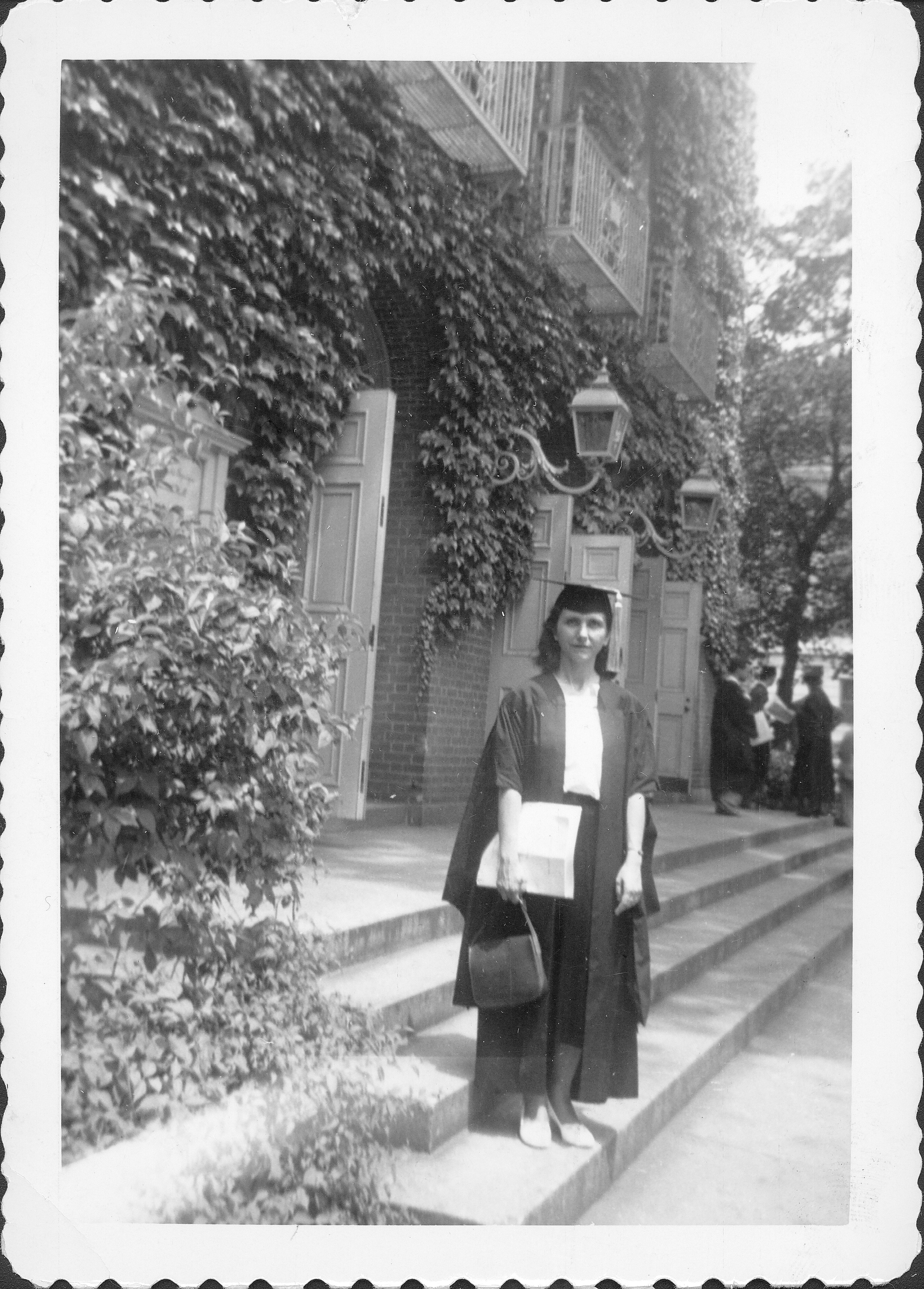
Violet Archer on graduation day, Yale University.

Born Violetta Balestreri in Montreal (the family changed its name to Archer in 1940), Archer earned a Licentiate in music from McGill University in 1934, and a Bachelor of Music from McGill in 1936; she studied composition with Claude Champagne and Douglas Clarke. Archer travelled to New York in the summer of 1942 to study composition, including Hungarian folk music and variation technique, with Béla Bartók. She taught at the McGill Conservatory from 1944-47. Later in the 1940s she studied with Paul Hindemith at Yale, where she earned a B.Mus. (1948) and an M.Mus. (1949). From 1950-53, Archer was composer-in-residence at the University of North Texas. From 1953-61, she taught at the University of Oklahoma. Returning to Canada in 1961 as a doctoral candidate at the University of Toronto, she set her studies aside when, in 1962, she joined the Faculty of Music at the University of Alberta, where she taught until her retirement in 1978; during this time she was chair of the theory and composition department. Her notable students included Larry Austin, Jan Randall, Allan Gilliland, and Allan Gordon Bell.

== Musical career ==
Archer built a career as a musician and composer in addition to teaching. She played percussion in the Montreal Women's Symphony Orchestra from 1940-47 during the era when women had no access to positions in major professional orchestras. In addition to percussion, Archer played clarinet and strings, and worked in Montreal as an accompanist and organist.

As a composer, Archer's prolific oeuvre of more than 330 compositions included traditional and more contemporary works for instrument and voice. Her wide-ranging work includes the 1973 comic opera, Sganarelle, the film score for the 1976 documentary, Someone Cares, and experiments with electronic music. Her music includes some 90 compositions for students, written to acquaint performers and audiences with modern concepts of harmony, melody, and rhythm.

== Honours ==
Archer received honorary degrees from McGill University (1971), University of Windsor (1986), University of Calgary (1989), Mount Allison University (1992), and University of Alberta (1993). In 1983, she was made a Member of the Order of Canada.

In 1985 the three-day Violet Archer Festival was held in Edmonton where 14 of her works were performed. This festival is credited as the first to honour a living Canadian composer. Violet Archer Park, located in Edmonton's Parkallen neighbourhood, is also named in her honour. In Calgary, the Prairie Region of Canadian Music Centre is home to the Violet Archer Library, which holds over 20,000 scores.

Archer died in Ottawa on February 21, 2000.

The Archer portrait in the Canadian Composers Portraits series was released in 2002.

In 2021, the Violet Archer fonds held at the University of Alberta Archives was added to the Canada Memory of the World Register.

The indie pop band, The Violet Archers, is named after her.

== Selected recordings ==
- 3 Concerti, Archer Piano Concerto, Christina Petrowska Quilico, piano, CBC Vancouver Orchestra, Sir John Eliot Gardiner, conductor, Centrediscs (CMCCD 15610)
- Women Composers for Organ, Barbara Harbach. Peterborough, NH: Gasparo Records (294), 2006.
- Ovation, Volume 2. Toronto: CBC Records (PSCD 2027–5), 2002.
- Sinfonietta (CBC Vancouver Chamber Orchestra, John Avison, conductor)
- Trio no. 2 (The Hertz Trio)
- String Quartet no. 3 (University of Alberta String Quartet)
- The Bell (CBC Chorus and Orchestra, Geoffrey Waddington, conductor)
- Northern Landscapes – A Tribute to Violet Archer, Sarah Muir and Ann Nichols, performers with the Columbian Girls Choir and Chanteuses. Edmonton, 1997.
- Surrealistic Portraiture Kenneth Fischer, saxophone, Martha Thomas, piano. Atlanta: ACA Digital (ACD 20036), 2001.
- By a Canadian Lady – Piano Music 1841–1997, Elaine Keillor, piano. Ottawa: Carleton Sound CD1006, 2000.
- Assemblage, Charles Foreman, piano. Calgary: Unical (CD9501), 1995?.
- Northern Arch, various artists, Edmonton: Arktos Recordings (ARK 94001), 1994.
- Soliloquies for changing Bb and A clarinets (performed by Dennis Prime)
- Crossroads, James Campbell, clarinet. Toronto: Centrediscs / Centredisques (CMCCD 4392), 1992.
- Ballade, Charles Foreman, piano. Toronto: Centrediscs, (CMCCD 1684), 1991.
- Hertz Trio. Calgary: Unical Records, 1991.

=== Songs ===
- "À la claire fontaine" (SA and piano) – Berandol Music

== See also ==
- Music of Canada
- List of Canadian musicians
- List of Canadian composers
