= Lee Hepner =

Canadian teacher and conductor

Dr. Lee Hepner (November 24, 1920 – July 24, 1986) ARCT 1950, B MUS (Toronto) 1951, BA (Washington) 1957, MA (Columbia) 1961, honorary FRHCM 1970, PH D (New York) 1972 was a Canadian teacher and orchestral conductor.

Hepner was born in Edmonton, Alberta. After organizing the Edmonton Pops Orchestra in 1947, he was principal conductor of the University of Toronto Symphony Orchestra (1949-1950). He was the founder and first Music Director of the Edmonton Symphony Orchestra (1952-1960), and subsequently was Music Director of the McMaster Operatic Society (1961-1967), the Hamilton Philharmonic Orchestra (1962-1969), and the Hamilton Opera Company (1966-1972). He taught music at Queens College, New York, and at McMaster University from 1961 until his death in Vancouver, British Columbia. He founded the McMaster Symphony Orchestra in 1973. The orchestra left McMaster University in 1988 and in 2019 was rebranded as Symphony Hamilton. Lee Hepner died of a heart attack while visiting family in Vancouver, BC, on July 24, 1986, at the age of 65. He is survived by his son, saxophonist, Darcy Hepner; and 3 grandchildren. His wife, pianist and music educator, Patricia Rolston, died in 2019. His son, guitarist and music educator, Dr. Jeremy Hepner died in 2013.

Cultural offices
Preceded by none	Music Directors, Edmonton Symphony Orchestra; 1952–1960	Succeeded by Brian Priestman
