= Leonard Ratzlaff =

Leonard Peter Ratzlaff, CM, AOE (born January 27, 1949) is the choral conductor for Edmonton's Richard Eaton Singers. Born in Swalwell, Alberta, he obtained his graduate degree in choral conducting from the University of Iowa, and his doctoral dissertation on Anton Bruckner's Te Deum earned him the American Choral Directors Association Julius Herford Dissertation Prize. A professor of Choral Music at the University of Alberta since 1981, he also conducts the University of Alberta Madrigal Singers, and co-supervises the largest graduate program in choral conducting in Canada. His honours include induction into the City of Edmonton Hall of Fame, the Queen Elizabeth II Golden Jubilee Medal, the Queen Elizabeth II Diamond Jubilee Medal for distinguished service to Canadian choral music, induction into the Alberta Order of Excellence, induction as a Fellow of the Royal Society of Canada and being named to the Order of Canada. In 2011, he and RES celebrated 30 years of his leadership as conductor.
