= Darcy Hepner =

Saxophonist, composer, and arranger (born 1954)

- Born: Darcy Rolston Hepner; December 22, 1954 (age 71); Edmonton, Alberta, Canada
- Occupations: Musician; composer; arranger
- Instrument: Saxophone
- Parent: Lee Hepner

Darcy Rolston Hepner (born December 22, 1954) is a Canadian saxophonist, composer, and arranger. Born in Edmonton, Alberta, and raised in Hamilton, Ontario, he is the son of professional musicians (conductor Dr. Lee Hepner and pianist Patricia Rolston). His professional career began as a cellist at the age of 15 and transitioned to flute, clarinet, and saxophone during his studies at McMaster University (BMus 1978). While pursuing jazz studies at the University of Miami he performed with Henry Mancini, B. B. King, Aretha Franklin, Tony Bennett, Mel Tormé and many others (MMUS 1980). Moving to New York City in 1983 he studied composition and saxophone at New York University with Lee Konitz and Bob Mintzer. During his second residency in New York from 1996 to 2005, Hepner toured with Blood, Sweat and Tears, played in Broadway and Off-Broadway shows and in clubs with such artists as Buster Poindexter and Tom Wopat.

Since 2008, he has recorded and performed with Tom Wilson and LeE HARVeY OsMOND as both a woodwind player and conductor/arranger for his symphony shows, which have included performances with the National Arts Centre Orchestra and the Hamilton Philharmonic Orchestra. He arranged and produced the Hamilton Philharmonic Orchestra's Beatles shows in 2017, 2019, and 2023 and their "The Music of James Bond" concert in February of 2025.

In 2015, he collaborated with Canadian musician Ian Thomas as arranger and conductor to develop a concert for the Hamilton Philharmonic Orchestra. The music for the concert was used to produce Thomas's Life In Song recording.

Hepner taught at Berklee College of Music (Boston) during 1985–89, and was founder and head of the Music Program at Selkirk College in Nelson, British Columbia, 1989–96. From 2005 to 2020, he held the position of professor of music at Mohawk College, Hamilton.

== Discography (selected) ==
As Leader

The Darcy Hepner Jazz Orchestra

• Blues In Another Minute (Water Street 2010)

As Sideman

With The Berlin Contemporary Jazz Orchestra

• The Morlocks and Other Pieces (FMP/Free Music Production 1993)

With Larry Carlton

• Plays the Sound of Philadelphia (335 2010)

With Andy Middleton

• Reinventing the World (Intuition 2003)

With Ian Thomas

• A Life In Song (Universal Music 2016)

• How We Roll (IAN 2024)

With Tom Wilson (LeE HARVeY OsMOND)

• A Quite Evil (Latent Recordings 2008)

• The Folk Sinner (Latent Recordings 2013)

• Beautiful Scars (Latent Recordings 2015)

• Symphonic Scars (TCW 2018)

• Mohawk (Latent Recordings 2019)
