= Jens Lindemann =

German-born Canadian musician (born 1966)

Jens Lindemann CM FRCMT(hon)
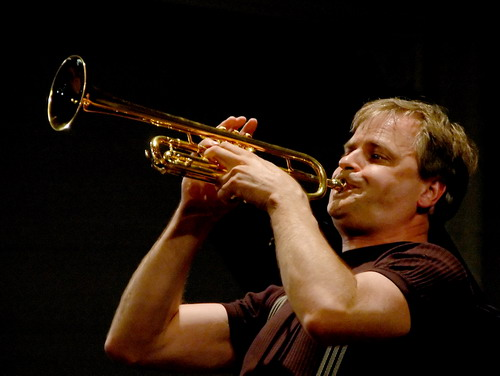
- Jens Lindemann at the Ottawa Chamber Music Festival 2006

Background information
- Born: 1966 (age 59–60); Germany
- Genres: Classical, Jazz
- Instrument: Trumpet

Jens Lindemann CM FRCMT(hon) (born year 1966) is a German-born Canadian trumpet soloist of Polish Jewish heritage living in Los Angeles. He is the first classical brass soloist to be awarded the Order of Canada, the country's highest civilian honour. He played in the Canadian Brass from 1989 to 2006 and continues to play at major concert venues all over the world as an orchestral soloist, with chamber groups, jazz bands, and also as a recitalist and masterclinician.

Lindemann is a professor with high distinction at University of California, Los Angeles and was a Distinguished Visiting Artist at Shenandoah Conservatory of Shenandoah University in Winchester, Virginia. He has also taught at the Banff Centre in Banff, Alberta. Lindemann also has an honorary doctorate (LL.D.) from McMaster University, Honorary Fellow (FRCMT) from the Royal Conservatory of Music in Toronto and the Medal of Excellence from MacEwan University.

Named "Personality of the Year 2006" by the British magazine The Brass Herald, Lindemann also hosted the 33rd International Trumpet Guild conference at the Banff Centre in June 2008. He has given numerous world premières with orchestras including the North American première of Bernd Alois Zimmermann's concerto Nobody Knows with the Toronto Symphony.

Lindemann studied at the Juilliard School of Music in New York City and McGill University in Montreal. Among numerous distinctions, he has been a nominee for 2 Grammy awards, 5 Juno awards in 4 four different categories and received the Echo Klassik in Germany. As part of Alberta's centenary celebrations in 2005, he gave a solo Command Performance for Queen Elizabeth II. Jens Lindemann was also the first prize winner of two major international solo contests in 1992, the Prague Spring Festival competition and the Ellsworth Smith (Florida), both by unanimous juries. In May 2012, playing with the Edmonton Symphony Orchestra, he was the first Canadian trumpeter to perform as a featured soloist at Carnegie Hall in New York City. Founding member of the All Star Brass, which has recorded 4 CD's as well as the first live brass chamber version of Ottorino Respighi's Pines of Rome, Lindemann is also the Artistic Director of the Banff Centre International Summer Brass Festival and Artistic Director of the Jeju International Wind Ensemble Festival in Korea.

Lindemann was appointed a Member of the Order of Canada in 2014.

== Discography ==
Solo:

- Flying Solo (2003)
- Rising Sun (2005)
- The Classic Trumpet (2008)
- Trumpet Concertos of Haydn, Hummel, Hertel, and Albinoni (2018)
- Bach and Brahms Reimagined (2020)
- Then is Now 'Rhapsody in Blue (2020)

As guest/ensemble member:

- All Star Brass Live 2009, 2010, 2011, Toccata and Fugue
- Pines of Rome with Italian Wonderbrass (2011)
- Dreaming of the Masters (2011)

With Canadian Brass:

- Canadian Brass Plays Bernstein (1996)
- Canadian Brass Christmas Experiment (1997)
- Canadian Brass All You Need is Love (1998)
- Canadian Brass A Christmas Gloria (1999)
- Canadian Brass Take the "A" Train (1999)
- Canadian Brass Celebration (1999)
- Canadian Brass Bach – Goldberg Variations (2001)
