= Malcolm Forsyth =

South African-Canadian musician (1936–2011)

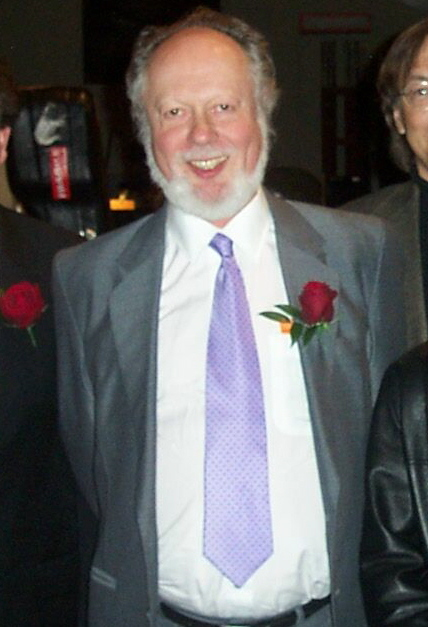
- Forsyth in 2005
- Born: December 8, 1936; Pietermaritzburg, South Africa
- Died: July 5, 2011 (aged 74); Edmonton, Alberta
- Occupations: Composer, teacher, trombonist

Malcolm Forsyth, CM (December 8, 1936 – July 5, 2011) was a South African-Canadian composer, teacher, and trombonist.

== Biography ==
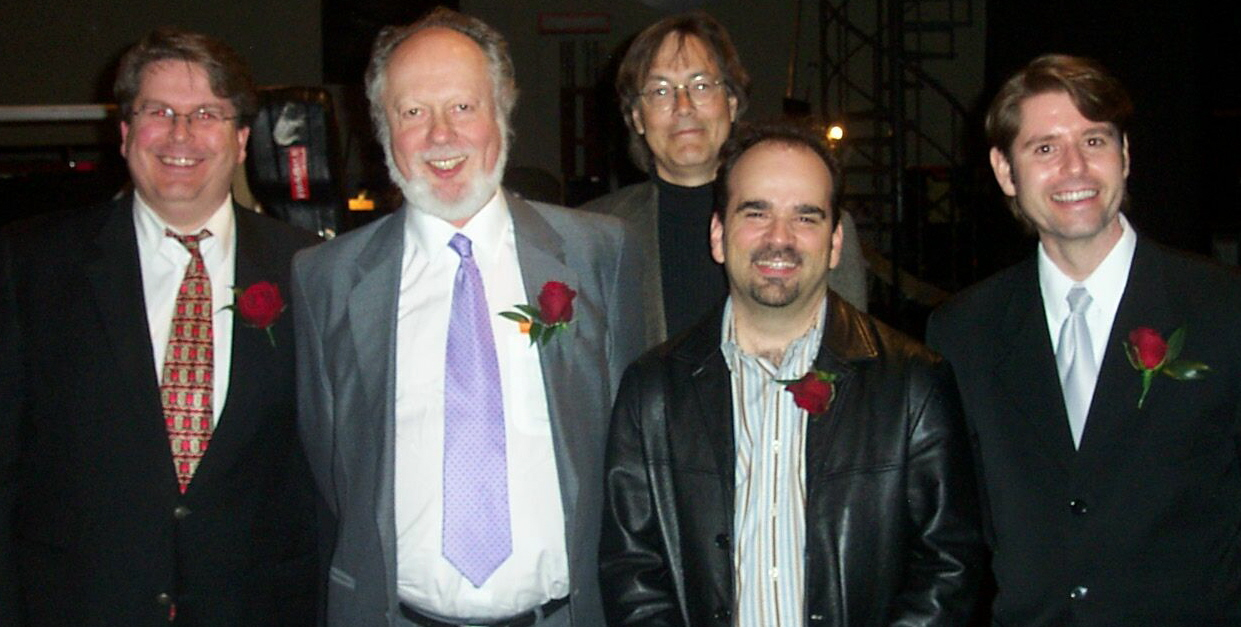
Composers Allan Gilliland, Malcolm Forsyth, Allan Gordon Bell, John Estacio, and Jeff McCune following an Edmonton Symphony performance of their music in April 2005

Born in Pietermaritzburg, Forsyth attended Maritzburg College, South Africa. He studied trombone, conducting, and composition at the University of Cape Town where he received a Bachelor of Music in 1963. He played trombone with the Cape Town Symphony Orchestra while studying for a Master of Music degree in 1966 and a doctorate in 1969.

In 1968, he emigrated to Canada to join the Edmonton Symphony Orchestra where he played bass trombone, then principal trombone, for 11 years. He was a music professor at the University of Alberta for 34 years, including as composer-In-residence from 1996 until his retirement in 2002. His students included composers Allan Gilliland, Allan Gordon Bell, Jeff McCune, and Allan Bevan.

In 1970, Forsyth wrote Sketches from Natal for the CBC. Some of his other works include Concerto for Piano and Orchestra (1979), Sagittarius (1975), Quinquefid (1976), African Ode (Symphony no. 3) (1981), and Atayoskewin (Suite for Orchestra) (1984), which received the Juno Award for classical composition in 1987. He also received Junos in 1995 and 1998.

In 1988, the Canadian Music Council named him Composer of the Year and, in 2003, he received the Order of Canada and the Queen's Golden Jubilee Medal.

The Forsyth portrait in the Canadian Composers Portraits series was released in 2002.

Forsyth died in Edmonton on July 5, 2011.

His daughter is the cellist, Amanda Forsyth.
