= John Estacio =

Canadian composer

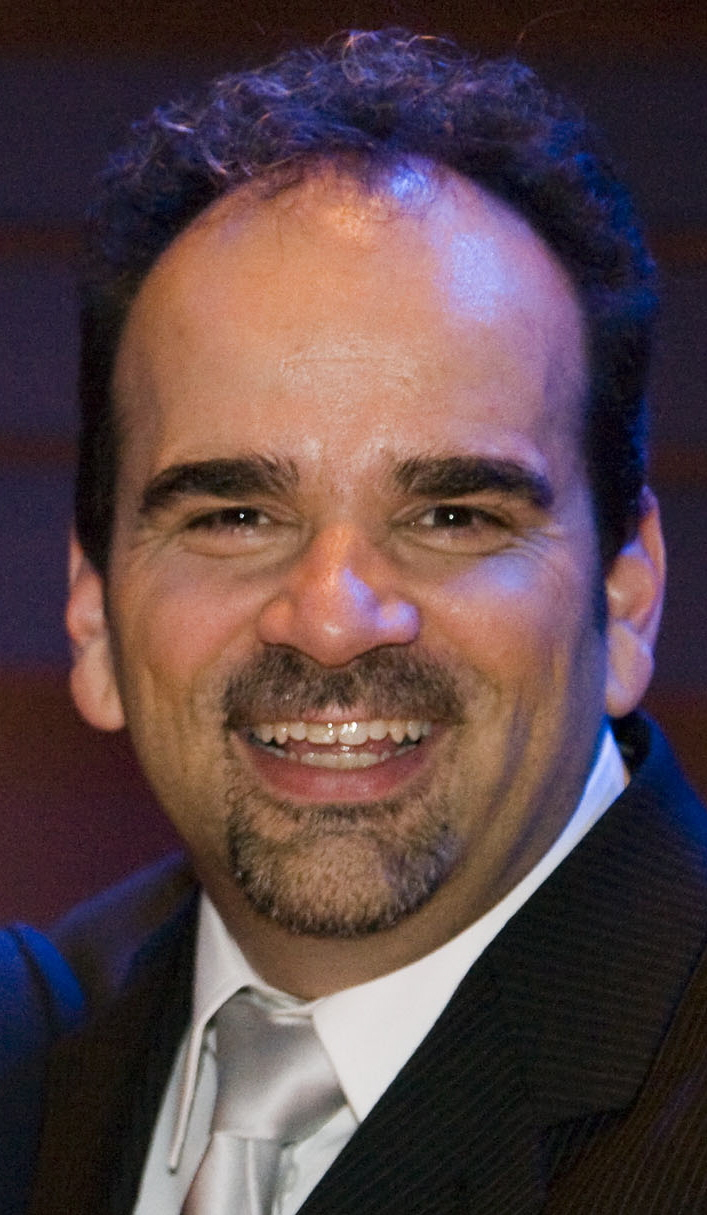
John Estacio in 2008

John Estacio CM (born April 8, 1966) is a contemporary Canadian composer of opera, orchestral and choral music.

== Life and career ==
Estacio was born in Newmarket, Ontario. Raised in the farming community of the Holland Marsh, Ontario, Estacio took piano and accordion lessons, and played church organ every Sunday. As a teenager, he created soundtracks for short student films, played trumpet, and performed in high school productions of Broadway musicals.

He majored in composition at Wilfrid Laurier University in Waterloo, Ontario studying with Glenn Buhr and Peter Hatch. He earned his post-graduate degree at the University of British Columbia where he studied composition with Stephen Chatman.

In 1992, his first major orchestral work, Visoes da Noite, won second-prize in the Winnipeg Symphony Orchestra's Canadian Composers Competition. Saudades for orchestra was premiered at the WSO's New Music Festival in 1993.

From 1992 to 2000, Estacio was Composer in Residence of the Edmonton Symphony Orchestra. During his residency, Estacio created several orchestral works, participated in novel audience outreach programs, and created the Young Composers Project. A Farmer's Symphony (1994), Borealis (1997), Flights of Fancy (1999), Frenergy (1998), Triple Concerto for Piano, Violin and Cello (1997), Variations on a Memory (1995), Victims of Us All (1996), Wondrous Light (1997) and The Twins and the Monster (2001) a children's tale for actress and orchestra with text by Tololwa M. Mollel, were all written for the ESO.

From 2000 to 2003, Estacio was Composer in Residence with the Calgary Philharmonic Orchestra and the Calgary Opera. He composed Solaris (2000), Bootlegger's Tarantella (2001) and Spring's Promise (2004) for the orchestra, and between 2001 and 2003 he wrote the opera Filumena (based on the life of Filumena Lassandro) with librettist John Murrell. Premiered in Calgary, the opera has been performed at the Banff Centre, Ottawa's National Arts Centre, and by the Edmonton Opera, where it was filmed for television broadcast on the CBC television network.

Estacio has also been commissioned to write works for the Toronto Symphony Orchestra, the Montreal Symphony Orchestra, the Manitoba Chamber Orchestra, the Vancouver Symphony Orchestra, the CBC Radio Orchestra, the Banff International String Quartet Competition, and the Penderecki String Quartet. His music has been performed by all the major Canadian orchestras, as well as internationally.

In 2003 the Edmonton Symphony Orchestra and conductor Mario Bernardi recorded six of Estacio's major orchestral compositions. Released in 2004, the compact disc Frenergy was nominated for two Juno Awards. In 2004 the Thunder Bay Symphony Orchestra and Music Director Geoffrey Moull recorded Variations on a Memory for a new CD that was also nominated for a Juno Award and became the best-selling disc of the Canadian Music Centre in 2005. Estacio received SOCAN's Jan V. Matejcek Concert Music Award in 2004, 2005, and 2007, as well as Young Composer Awards from SOCAN and PROCAN in 1989, 1990, 1992 and 1994.

Recent works include orchestrations of Seven Songs by Jean Sibelius for tenor Ben Heppner and the score of The Secret of The Nutcracker for a CBC television broadcast in December 2008. He currently resides in Edmonton, and recently completed his second opera, Frobisher (based on the life of Martin Frobisher), premiered in Calgary on January 27, 2007. The Houses Stand Not Far Apart, a large-scale work for chorus and orchestra commissioned by the Canada Council for the Vancouver Bach Choir, Edmonton's Richard Eaton Singers, the Grand Philharmonic Choir, and Chorus Niagara, and set to poetry by Calgary author John Murrell, was premiered in March 2008. Other upcoming commissions include a symphony for the Victoria Symphony Orchestra, and an opera for the Vancouver Opera. He recently wrote a piece for the Calgary Stampede Showband, entitled Prairie Ride and Sunset, which was commissioned by the band in 2012.

His most recent work is a world premiere ballet based on King Arthur's Camelot with the Cincinnati Ballet, premiering in February 2014. The work was commissioned as part of the Cincinnati Ballet's 50th season.
