= Oskar Morawetz =

Canadian composer

- Born: January 17, 1917; Světlá nad Sázavou, Bohemia
- Died: June 13, 2007 (aged 90) Toronto, Ontario, Canada
- Genres: Modern classical
- Occupations: Composer, professor of music
- Instrument: Piano
- Years active: 1944–1995
- Labels: Columbia, RCA Victor, EMI, Sony Classical, Centerdiscs, RCI/CBC
- Website: www.oskarmorawetz.com

Oskar Morawetz, CM OOnt (January 17, 1917 – June 13, 2007) was a Canadian composer, teacher and pianist.

== Biography ==
Morawetz was born in Světlá nad Sázavou, Bohemia (now in the Czech Republic), into a Jewish family. He studied piano and theory in Prague and, following the Nazi takeover of his country in 1938, studied in Vienna and Paris. At age 19 he was recommended by George Szell for the assistant conductor's post with the Prague Opera. In 1940 he left Europe for Canada where he began teaching at the Royal Conservatory of Music in 1946, and in 1952 was appointed to the University of Toronto where he was professor of composition until his retirement in 1982. His work was also part of the music event in the art competition at the 1948 Summer Olympics.

Morawetz's 1971 piece From the Diary of Anne Frank won a Juno Award for Best Classical Composition in 2001. His Concerto for Harp and Orchestra also won a Juno in 1989. On three occasions, Morawetz was awarded a Canada Council Senior Arts Fellowship (1960, 1967, 1974) for his contribution to Canadian music. In 1987, Morawetz received the Order of Ontario and in 1989 he received the Order of Canada. The Society of Composers, Authors and Music Publishers of Canada honoured Morawetz in 1994 and in 1999. He was also awarded an honorary diploma from the Royal Conservatory of Music (1998) and the Golden Jubilee Medal (2002).

A seven-record set of Morawetz's music was included in the Anthology of Canadian Music series in 1983. The Morawetz portrait in the Canadian Composers Portraits series was released in 2002.

He died in Toronto on June 13, 2007.
