= King Biscuit Flower Hour Presents: Robin Trower in Concert =

Live album by Robin Trower
- Released: 1996
- Recorded: 1977-10-18
- Venue: New Haven Coliseum
- Genre: Blues rock
- Length: 70:17
- Label: King Biscuit Flower Hour Records

Professional ratings
Review scores
Source	Rating
AllMusic	3/5 stars

King Biscuit Flower Hour Presents: Robin Trower in Concert is a live album by Robin Trower. It was released in 1996 on a King Biscuit Flower Hour Records label.

== Track listing ==
No.	Title	Writer(s)	Original album	Length
1.	"Lady Love"	James Dewar / Robin Trower	Bridge of Sighs (1974)	3:54
2.	"Somebody Calling"	Dewar / Trower	In City Dreams (1977)	5:40
3.	"Falling Star"	Dewar / Trower	In City Dreams (1977)	3:12
4.	"Too Rolling Stoned"	Trower	Bridge of Sighs (1974)	5:39
5.	"Smile"	Dewar / Trower	In City Dreams (1977)	5:18
6.	"Daydream"	Dewar / Trower	Twice Removed from Yesterday (1973)	12:36
7.	"The Fool and Me"	Dewar / Trower	Bridge of Sighs (1974)	4:40
8.	"Bridge of Sighs"	Trower	Bridge of Sighs (1974)	9:04
9.	"Day of the Eagle"	Trower	Bridge of Sighs (1974)	3:47
10.	"Little Bit of Sympathy"	Trower	Bridge of Sighs (1974)	7:02
11.	"Messin' the Blues"	Dewar / Bill Lordan / Trower	Long Misty Days (1976)	6:44
12.	"Further On Up the Road"	Joe Medwick / Don Robey	In City Dreams (1977)	2:41

== Personnel ==
- Robin Trower - guitar
- James Dewar - vocals
- Rusty Allen - bass
- Bill Lordan - drums

Production

- Carl Nappa - engineer
- Gary Lyons - mix
- Suha Gur - master
- Bruce Pilato - liner notes
