= Ain't Nothin' to Get Excited About =

Studio album by Liquorice John Death
- Released: 1997
- Recorded: 1970
- Studios: Abbey Road Studios, London
- Genre: Blues rock
- Producer: Chris Thomas

Procol Harum chronology
| The Long Goodbye (1995) | Ain't Nothin' to Get Excited About (1997) | One More Time – Live in Utrecht 1992 (1999) |

Ain't Nothin' to Get Excited About is an album of rock and roll songs recorded in 1970 by the members of Procol Harum under the name Liquorice John Death. It was not released until 1997.

== History ==
Strictly speaking, this is not a Procol Harum album; it was recorded shortly after the band had finished working on their 1970 album Home. During these recording sessions, producer Chris Thomas asked the band to play some old favourites while he set up the equipment for recording. The band enjoyed playing these older songs, so a few months later Thomas booked the Abbey Road recording studio, and the band recorded all the tracks on this album in a single night. "We staggered out at dawn, having attempted about 45 songs. We didn't finish them all. I think the drummer collapsed half way through with laughter." "Well, I..." is the only song they played that was written by the group, and is drummer B.J. Wilson's sole songwriting credit.

Although some tracks from the recording session were played by disc jockey Roger Scott on Capital Radio, to whom a tape was given, the fifteen-inch master tape was lost. The quarter-inch copy given to Scott also disappeared until the end of the 1990s, when it turned up in a box of tapes returned to the band by EMI-Chrysalis.

== Title ==
A friend of the musicians called Dave Mundy was responsible for the name of the band and of the album, as well as for the album cover. In the early 1960s, the musicians had performed these songs around Southend as The Paramounts, a name given to them by their manager. Mundy had objected to this name and devised one of his own for them, Liquorice John Death. After his suicide in 1970, it was found that Mundy had left all his possessions to Robin Trower, guitarist in The Paramounts and Procol Harum. These included a painting of an album cover for Liquorice John Death's Ain't Nothin' to Get Excited About. When the band found themselves able to release the album, they felt that there was no alternative but to use Mundy's ideas and cover.

Mundy is remembered in the song "For Liquorice John" (think 'Fall Icarus John') on Procol Harum's 1973 album Grand Hotel.

== Track listing ==
1. "High School Confidential" (Ron Hargrave, Jerry Lee Lewis) – 2:17
2. "Kansas City" (Jerry Leiber, Mike Stoller) – 3:40
3. "Lucille" (Albert Collins, Richard Penniman) – 3:21
4. "Brand New Cadillac" (Vince Taylor) – 1:37
5. "Matchbox" (Carl Perkins) – 2:28
6. "Breathless" (Otis Blackwell) – 2:59
7. "Everything I Do Is Wrong" (Charlie Rich) – 3:11
8. "Old Black Joe" (Stephen Foster; arranged by Brooker, Trower, Wilson and Copping) – 3:07
9. "Shopping for Clothes" (Kent Harris) – 3:33
10. "Well, I..." (Brooker, Trower, Wilson, Copping, Dave Mundy) – 6:30
11. "I'm Ready" (Fats Domino, Al Lewis, Sylvester Bradford) – 2:51
12. "The Girl Can't Help It" (Bobby Troup) – 2:07
13. "Keep a Knockin'" (Richard Penniman) – 1:24

== Personnel ==
Liquorice John Death

- Gary Brooker – vocals, piano
- Robin Trower – guitar
- Chris Copping – bass, organ
- B.J. Wilson – drums

with:

- Jack Lancaster – saxophone (9, 12)

Technical

- Dave Mundy - artwork

== Sources and external links ==
- ProcolHarum.com's page on this album
