= Pete Thompson =

Drummer

Pete Thompson (born 1952) is an English rock drummer who has played with Silverhead, Robin Trower, Robert Plant, Pete Haycock, Eric Bibb, Ken Hensley, and David Byron. He has been a professional touring, recording and session drummer throughout his career and has expanded his interests to include producing and composing.

== Early life ==
Pete Thompson was born in Bournemouth, England, and spent most of his life in Southend-on-Sea. He admits in his biography on his official website that when he "was always tapping and singing and generally driving my teachers and parents mad." He got his first drum kit in 1968 and rapidly gained a local attention as a fine young drummer in a town that produced notables such as Gary Brooker, Robin Trower, Mickey Jupp, and Procol Harum. At 19, he became a professional drummer and went on a U.S.O. tour in Europe and played for the soldiers on R&R from the Vietnam War. It was at that time that he met Rod T. "Rook" Davies, guitarist and alumni of David Bowie's The Riot Squad, who would later bring Pete in as the drummer for Silverhead.

== Music life in the 1900s ==
=== Involvement with Silverhead: 1972–74 ===
After the U.S.O. Tour, he joined the British band Silverhead in 1972. They toured the United States, Europe and Japan. Silverhead played support for some of the biggest bands of the era, including Kiss, Deep Purple, Nazareth and Uriah Heep. Silverhead included Michael Des Barres, Nigel Harrison, for a short time- Stevie Forest who was replaced by Robbie Blunt, and Thompson's friend Rod T. Davies. Silverhead stopped touring in 1974 and was disbanded.

=== Involvement with Ken Hensley: 1974–83 ===
When Silverhead was over with, Pete became a session drummer for MCA UK. He did many commercials and jingles for radio and television. Thompson appears on the 1975 Murray Head release Say It Ain't So. Also in 1975 he joined his friend and former colleague David Byron, lead singer of Uriah Heep for the album Take No Prisoners. In 1980, Thompson joined Ken Hensley, another Uriah Heep alumnus, for Ken's first solo outing in the band Shotgun. The lineup included Ian Gibbons on keyboards and Denny Ball on bass. Shotgun did 2 shows at London's Marquee. Hensley changed the name of the group to The Ken Hensley Band to highlight his efforts as a solo artist and the band did a North American tour in 1982.

=== Involvement in Pete Haycock's Climax: 1983–86 and Old Pal's Act plus Trower, Bibb, and Bronze: 1986–89 ===
From 1983 to 1986, Thompson joined former Climax Blues Band guitarist Pete Haycock. They toured Australia and Europe and recorded Total Climax and Guitar and Son. Thompson played with The Old Pal's Act, who would become The Hamsters, where he met bassist Dave Bronze. Bronze and Thompson would team up again touring and recording with Eric Bibb and Robin Trower. Thompson joined Trower in 1986 and recorded Passion and Take What You Need. Thompson was awarded Best Drummer-Rock Category by National Association of Independent Record Distributors in 1986 for his performance on Passion. Thompson was the drummer for Melanie Safka during her 1987 tour of the UK and appears on the BBC Radio 1 live recording "BBC On Air: Melanie"

== 1990s–current ==
Thompson traded touring for a more settled life, teaching seven days a week in his hometown of Southend-on-Sea and for ten years leading the house band at The Blue Last in London, England. In 1993, he recorded Fate of Nations with Robert Plant, which scored Thompson Gold and Platinum Album awards. In 2005, Thompson rejoined Robin Trower and Old Pal, Dave Bronze for Living Out of Time They toured and also made a DVD Living Out of Time: Live. In 2002–03, Thompson and Bronze toured with Eric Bibb in Australia and Europe and recorded the album Friends. He also did some short tours with Dr. Feelgood and The Hamsters. Thompson worked with Trower in 2004 and in 2005 and on the soundtrack for the movie Good Humor Man starring Kelsey Grammer. Thompson has been Trower's drummer recording and touring in Europe and North American nearly every year since 2006 and to date has recorded 6 albums with Robin. Pete relocated to the United States in 2008. He continues his association with Trower recording and touring and works as a producer, teacher, performer, and composer in his spare time.
