= 20th Century Blues =

20th Century Blues may refer to:

- Blues, the musical form and genre
- "Twentieth Century Blues", a song from the 1931 musical Cavalcade by Noël Coward
- 20th Century Blues (Marianne Faithfull album), 1996
- 20th Century Blues (Robin Trower album), 1994
- 20th Century Blues, (play by Susan Miller), 2018

== See also ==
- Twentieth-Century Blues: The Songs of Noël Coward, a 1998 Noël Coward tribute album
