= Captain Midnight (disambiguation) =

Captain Midnight is a U.S. adventure franchise that began with a radio show.

Captain Midnight may also refer to:

- Captain Midnight, the Bush King, a 1911 Australian silent film
- Captain Midnight (serial), a 1942 film serial
- On the Air Live with Captain Midnight, a 1979 movie with a character who used "Captain Midnight" as an alias
- John R. MacDougall (born 1961), electronic engineer who in 1986 jammed HBO's satellite signal in protest
- Steve Somers (born 1947), WFAN radio host known as "Captain Midnight"
- "Captain Midnight", a song from Robin Trower's 1983 album Back It Up
- "Capt. Midnight", a song from Tomahawk's 2003 album Mit Gas
