= The Long Goodbye (Procol Harum album) =

Studio album by various artists
- Released: 18 July 1995
- Recorded: April 1994 – March 1995
- Genre: Rock
- Length: 61:41
- Label: RCA Victor
- Producer: Gary Brooker

The Long Goodbye (The Symphonic Music of Procol Harum) is an orchestral album of Procol Harum music that was released in 1995. The album was produced by longtime Procol Harum vocalist/pianist/songwriter Gary Brooker, and among the various musicians who contributed to the album are Procol Harum members Robin Trower and Matthew Fisher. The main performers on the album are the London Symphony Orchestra and the London Philharmonic Orchestra, with one track performed by Sinfonia of London.

Unlike all the other songs on the album, the title track has never been officially released by Procol Harum; Procol Harum played the song on tours and recordings of this have appeared on bootlegs, but never on an official album or single. It was a Gary Brooker solo single and included on the Gary Brooker solo album Echoes in the Night, which was co-produced by Brooker and Fisher, who also co-composed the song's music. Its lyrics were written by Procol Harum's Keith Reid and Procol Harum's B.J. Wilson played drums on the track original single.

== Reception ==
Professional ratings
Review scores
| Source | Rating |
|---|---|
| AllMusic | 2/5 stars |

Writing for Allmusic, William Ruhlmann commented that while a symphonic tribute album would seem a natural fit for Procol Harum since they were among the first musicians to attempt to marry rock music with classical music, the new arrangements overemphasize the symphonic side, "making the music seem less stately than soporific." They also criticized Gary Brooker's vocal performances as unemotional and dull.

== Track listing ==
1. "Conquistador"
2. "Homburg"
3. "Grand Hotel"
4. "Simple Sister"
5. "A Salty Dog"
6. "Pandora's Box"
7. "A Whiter Shade of Pale"
8. "Repent Walpurgis"
9. "(You Can't) Turn Back the Page"
10. "Strangers in Space"
11. "Butterfly Boys"
12. "The Long Goodbye"

== Personnel ==
- London Symphony Orchestra – various instruments
- London Philharmonic Orchestra – various instruments
- Sinfonia of London – various instruments on "The Long Goodbye"
- Matthew Fisher – church organ on "Repent Walpurgis"
- Dave Bronze – bass
- Mark Brzezicki – drums
- Robin Trower – guitar on "Repent Walpurgis"
- Geoff Whitehorn – guitar
- Andy Fairweather Low – guitar
- Gary Brooker – piano, accordion, harpsichord, vocals
- Keith Reid – lyrics

Also

- Tom Jones – vocals on "Simple Sister"
- Jerry Hadley – vocals on "Grand Hotel"
- James Galway – flute on "Pandora's Box"
