= Burns Howff =

Music venue in Glasgow, Scotland

Coordinates: 55.864°N 4.261°W

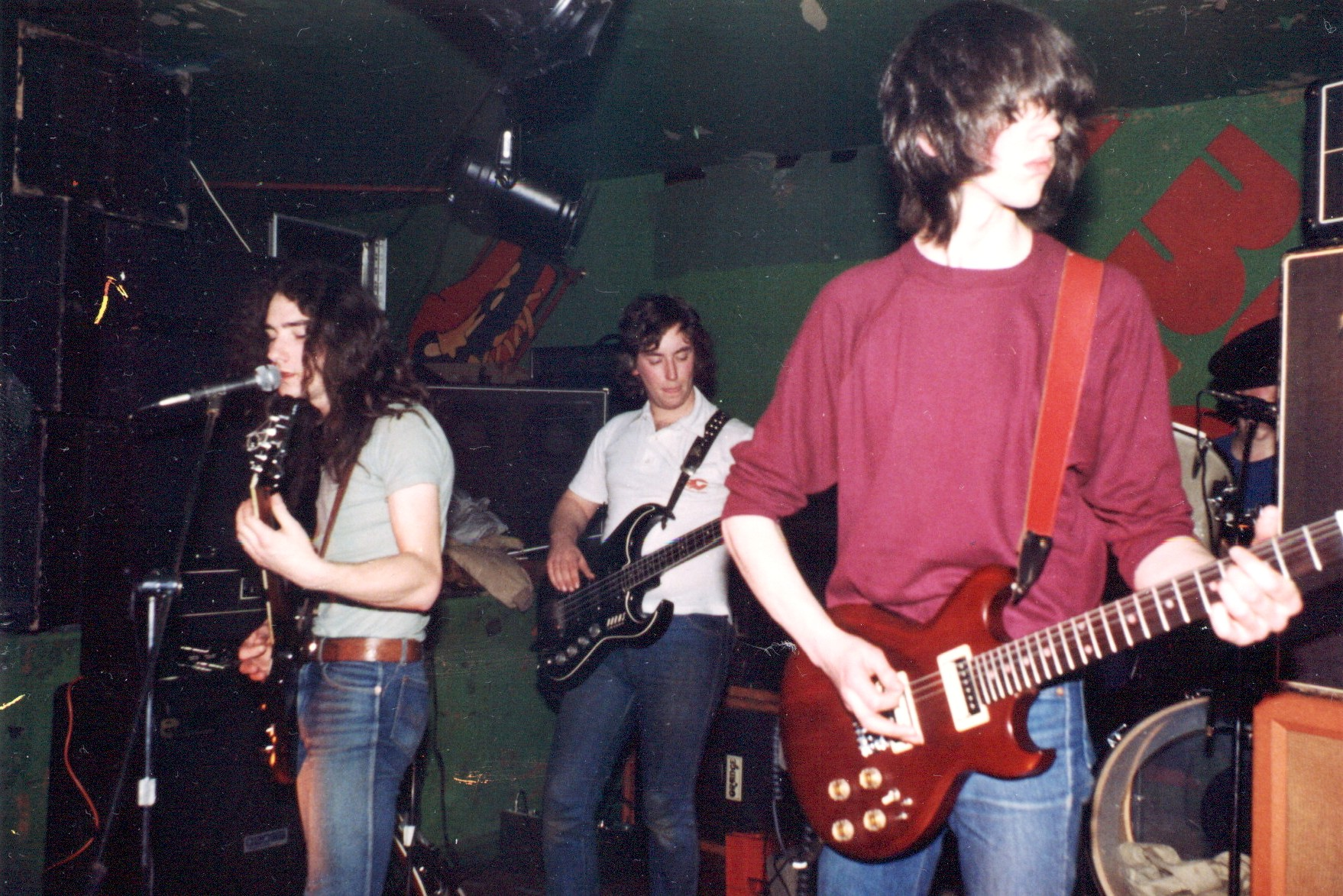
The stage with lettered backdrop and hotdog

The Burns Howff was a Rock and Blues music venue in Glasgow. It was located at 56 West Regent Street in the city centre and established a reputation as the launch pad for many Scottish musicians.

Burns Howff resident bands included Power, that later changed name to Stone the Crows. This band featured Maggie Bell on vocals, and James Dewar on bass guitar. James Dewar, known as Jimmy Dewar later formed The Robin Trower Band with ex Procol Harum guitarist Robin Trower and drummer Reg Isadore.

It was in Burns Howff that Alex Harvey met with the musicians who were to become the Sensational Alex Harvey Band.

Other bands who played at Burns Howff included Beggars Opera, Chou Pahrot, and the illustrious 'Foxy', a talented 3-piece featuring Brian Denniston (guitar), Jimmy Johnston (Bass) and Nod Kerr (Drums).

The Shard a 5-piece R&B and soul band played frequently at the Howff for about 3 years in the late 1960s. Jimmy McLachlan lead guitar, Tommy Graham bass, Bill Samson on Drums, Joe McCann Keyboards and Jim Robertson vocals were the longest-serving members of the band.

Shortly before the ‘HOWFF’ closed a recording studio was installed called STUDIO In the upstairs lounge. This was a rather modest affair that was housed in what was essentially a walk in cupboard. The studio was popular with local bands, and clients included Johnny and the Self Abusers who were playing regularly at another Glasgow music pub called The Mars Bar, that featured mainly Punk acts. Johnny and the Self Abusers split up and its members went on to form The Cuban Heels and Simple Minds. With the bands playing in the upstairs lounge there was a resident DJ in the bar area from 1973 onwards. This was called The Pony Express, where rock music was played to the bar customers and also transmitted into the upstairs lounge while the band had their break. DJ Gordon Elrick also ran theme nights including the popular Tuesday Club where regulars dressed up and mimed to old standards. This made the Howff one of the busiest pubs in the area on a usually quiet Tuesday night.

Burns Howff finally closed in 1984.
