= The Paramounts =

British band

- The Paramounts c. mid-1965 Clockwise from top left: Gary Brooker, Diz Derrick, B. J. Wilson, Robin Trower

Background information
- Also known as: Liquorice John Death
- Origin: Southend-on-Sea, Essex, England
- Genres: R&B, soul, pop
- Years active: 1959–1966
- Label: Parlophone
- Members: Robin Trower; Gary Brooker; Chris Copping; Mick Brownlee; Bob Scott; Diz Derrick; B. J. Wilson

The Paramounts were an English beat group based in Southend-on-Sea, Essex. They had one hit single with their cover version of "Poison Ivy", which reached No. 35 on the UK Singles Chart in 1964, but are primarily known as the precursor to Procol Harum.

== Career ==
The origin of the Paramounts is unclear. They were either formed as "The Raiders" in 1959 when the members were at secondary school, or were one of the first "manufactured" bands created by the organisers of a band competition at the Palace Hotel in Southend out of the best musicians in the contest. The Raiders had Robin Trower and Chris Copping (guitars), Mick Trower (older brother of Robin, lead vocals) and Gary Nicholls (drums; born 1945, died April 2007). The initial line-up of the Paramounts, from September 1960, was Gary Brooker (piano, ex-Johnny Short and the Coasters), Mick Brownlee (drums; born 13 October 1943, Chiswick, West London, died 17 June 2017, ex-Mickey Law and the Outlaws), Chris Copping (bass), Bob Scott (vocals, ex-Bob Scott and the Clansmen) and Robin Trower (guitar). Scott soon left, and Brooker became the vocalist, but as he was only 14, which made playing in licensed premises difficult, so they started performing in Trower's father's cafe, which became The Shades Club.

Copping left in December 1962 and Brownlee left in September 1963. They were replaced by Diz Derrick (bass; born Grahame Derrick, 11 December 1944, Upminster, Essex) and B. J. Wilson (drums). Their musical style evolved from their initial R&B towards soul and, by 1963, they were regularly playing in London, and were signed by Parlophone. In late 1964 and early 1965, they had Phil Wainman on drums (born Philip Neil Wainman, 7 June 1946, Hampton Court), briefly replaced Wilson, who went to Jimmy Powell and the Five Dimensions. The Paramounts' first single, "Poison Ivy", produced by Ron Richards, was a cover of the Leiber and Stoller song, which had been a hit for The Coasters in 1959. It became a minor hit for the Paramounts, reaching No. 35 on the UK Singles Chart, and led to them appearing on TV shows such as Ready Steady Go!

Their second and third singles, "Bad Blood" and "I'm the One who Loves You", both failed to chart, but the B-side of the third single, "It Won't Be Long", was the first song written by Brooker and Trower to be released. In search of another hit, subsequent singles were in different styles, but none of them charted. The group became backing musicians on European tours by Sandie Shaw and Chris Andrews and disbanded in 1966.

Brooker concentrated on writing music, collaborating with Keith Reid, and Matthew Fisher (organ), and they recorded "A Whiter Shade of Pale". To support the record with a tour, Brooker persuaded Trower and Wilson to rejoin the band and augmented them with David Knights (bass). By 1969, Knights and Fisher had left and Chris Copping had rejoined.

== Liquorice John Death ==
A friend of the musicians, Dave Mundy, disliked the name "Paramounts", which had been given to them by their manager, and wanted them to be called "Liquorice John Death". Mundy committed suicide in 1972, but left his possessions to Trower, including a painting of an album cover for an imaginary album by 'Liquorice John Death', which Mundy had called Ain't Nothin' to Get Excited About.

In 1969, after Fisher and Knights had left Procol Harum, and Copping had joined, the line-up had evolved into the Paramounts' final line-up, minus Diz Derrick. At a practice/rehearsal in January 1970 the new line-up recorded 38 songs at Abbey Road Studios. Largely R&B covers that they had originally played as the "Paramounts", or songs in a similar vein, 13 of the tracks were mixed by Chris Thomas but the recordings were shelved.

An album containing all the Paramounts' singles, called Whiter Shades of R&B, was issued in 1983. In 1998 all the known original Paramounts recordings were remastered, as were six of the 38 tracks recorded by Procol Harum, in the Paramounts' style, in 1970. These remastered tracks were issued on a CD using Mundy's band and album names, and his cover art. The CD was re-released in 2005 by Friday Music, without Mundy's cover.

== Band members ==
- Robin Trower – guitar
- Gary Brooker – piano, vocals
- Chris Copping – bass
- Mick Brownlee (born 1943) – drums
- Bob Scott – vocals
- Diz Derrick (born Grahame Derrick in 1944) – bass
- B. J. Wilson – drums
- Phil Wainman – drums

== Discography ==
- "Poison Ivy"/"I Feel Good All Over" (1963) Parlophone (UK No. 35)
- "Little Bitty Pretty One"/"A Certain Girl" (1964) Parlophone
- "I'm The One Who Loves You"/"It Won't Be Long" (1964) Parlophone
- "Bad Blood"/"Do I" (1964) Parlophone
- "Blue Ribbons"/"Cuttin' It" (1965) Parlophone
- "You Never Had It So Good"/"Don't Ya Like My Love" (1965) Parlophone

EP

- The Paramounts (1964) Parlophone (GEP 8908)

Compilations

- Whiter Shades of R&B (1983) Edsel (ED 112) – CD (1991) Edsel (ED CD 112)
- The Paramounts at Abbey Road 1963–1970 CD (1998) EMI (7243 496436 2 8)

As Liquorice John Death

- Ain't Nothin' to Get Excited About
