= For Earth Below =

Studio album by Robin Trower
- Released: February 1975
- Studios: Record Plant, Los Angeles, California
- Genres: Blues rock, hard rock
- Length: 36:01
- Label: Chrysalis/Capitol
- Producer: Matthew Fisher

Robin Trower chronology
Bridge of Sighs (1974)	For Earth Below (1975)	Robin Trower Live (1976)

Professional ratings
Review scores
Source	Rating
AllMusic	3/5 stars
Christgau's Record Guide	C−

For Earth Below is guitarist and songwriter Robin Trower's third solo album with cover art by "Funky" Paul Olsen. It was released in 1975, and peaked at No. 5 on the Billboard 200 album chart in April 1975.

A 50th-anniversary, four-CD expanded edition was released in 2025.

== Track listing ==
All tracks are written by Robin Trower, except where indicated.

Side one
No.	Title	Writer(s)	Length
1.	"Shame the Devil"		3:32
2.	"It's Only Money"		5:36
3.	"Confessin' Midnight"		5:50
4.	"Fine Day"	James Dewar, Robin Trower	3:33
Total length:			18:31

Side two
No.	Title	Writer(s)	Length
5.	"Alethea"		3:02
6.	"A Tale Untold"		5:25
7.	"Gonna Be More Suspicious"	James Dewar, Robin Trower	3:03
8.	"For Earth Below"		6:00
Total length:			17:30

=== 50th Anniversary Edition ===
Disc one - Original 1975 Mix
No.	Title	Length

Disc two - 2025 Remix
No.	Title	Length

Disc three - Outtakes & Rarities
No.	Title	Length
1.	"It’s Only Money" (Vocal Take 1)	5:37
2.	"Fine Day" (Vocal Take Jam 1)	3:33
3.	"Alethea" (Vocal Take 2)	4:17
4.	"Happy" (Vocal Take 1)	3:15
5.	"The Moody One" (Instrumental Take 2)	5:23
6.	"Interview 1" (Top of the Pops with Brian Matthew, 28 January 1975)	0:58
7.	"Fine Day" (Top of the Pops with Brian Matthew, 28 January 1975)	3:21
8.	"Interview 2" (Top of the Pops with Brian Matthew, 28 January 1975)	6:03
9.	"Confessin’ Midnight" (Top of the Pops with Brian Matthew, 28 January 1975)	4:01
10.	"It’s Only Money" (Top of the Pops with Brian Matthew, 28 January 1975)	5:02
11.	"Gonna Be More Suspicious" (Top of the Pops with Brian Matthew, 28 January 1975)	3:00
12.	"Fine Day" (BBC Live in Concert, 29 January 1975)	3:32
13.	"Alethea" (BBC Live in Concert, 29 January 1975)	4:25
14.	"Gonna Be More Suspicious" (BBC Live in Concert, 29 January 1975)	3:15
15.	"Rehearsal Instrumental Jam" (September 1974)	17:46

Disc four - Live at the Shrine Auditorium & Expo Hall, Los Angeles, 16 March 1975
No.	Title	Length
1.	"Day of the Eagle"	3:53
2.	"Bridge of Sighs"	7:25
3.	"Gonna Be More Suspicious"	3:11
4.	"Fine Day"	3:56
5.	"Lady Love"	3:14
6.	"Daydream"	9:46
7.	"Too Rolling Stoned"	7:40
8.	"I Can't Wait Much Longer"	7:05
9.	"Alethea"	5:35
10.	"Little Bit of Sympathy"	6:03
11.	"Confessin' Midnight"	7:27
12.	"Rock Me Baby"	7:37
13.	"The Fool and Me"	6:03

== Personnel ==
- Robin Trower – guitar
- James Dewar – bass, vocals
- Bill Lordan – drums

== Charts ==
Chart (1975)	Peak position
Australia (Kent Music Report)	47
United Kingdom (Official Charts Company)	26
United States (Billboard 200)	5
