= Silverhead =

English glam rock band

Silverhead were an English glam rock band formed in early 1972, fronted by the singer/actor Michael Des Barres. The other members of the band were: Robbie Blunt (guitar), Rod Rook Davies (guitar, percussion, vocals), Nigel Harrison (bass guitar) and Pete Thompson (drums, percussion, keyboards, vocals). They were signed by Deep Purple's label Purple Records and recorded two studio albums, Silverhead (1972) and 16 and Savaged (1973), and were a part of the glam rock music scene of the 1970s.

In the UK they played support to bands such as Nazareth at Finsbury Park and Osibisa at the Brixton Sundown, and were the lead band in the Dagenham Roundhouse. Work on a third studio album (working title 'Brutiful') started in 1974, but the group disbanded in July 1974 before it was finished.

In April 2012, the band headed to Tokyo to play some reunion dates.

== Band personnel ==
- Rod Davies – guitar, vocals, percussion
- Michael Des Barres – vocals
- Nigel Harrison – bass
- Pete Thompson – drums, keyboards
- Stevie Forest – guitar, vocals (on Silverhead album)
- Robbie Blunt – guitar, vocals (on 16 and Savaged album)

Des Barres later joined the band Detective and recorded two albums with the band (Detective and It Takes One To Know One), and then Power Station, before moving into full-time acting. Harrison later joined Blondie, whilst Blunt went on to join up with Robert Plant.

== Discography ==
=== Studio albums ===
- Silverhead (1972)
- 16 and Savaged (1973)

=== Live albums ===
- Live at the Rainbow (1975) (Japan only)
- Show Me Everything (2001) (Japan only)
- Berlin Backlash 1973 (2019)

=== Compilation albums ===
- More Than Your Mouth Can Hold - The Complete Recordings 1972-1974 (6-CD) (2022)
