= Home (Procol Harum album) =

Studio album by Procol Harum
- Released: 5 June 1970
- Recorded: February 1970
- Studios: EMI Studios, Abbey Road, London
- Genres: Progressive rock, blues rock
- Length: 39:11
- Labels: Polydor (Germany), Regal Zonophone (UK), A&M Records (US/Canada & Australia)
- Producer: Chris Thomas

Procol Harum chronology
| A Salty Dog (1969) | Home (1970) | Broken Barricades (1971) |

Professional ratings
Review scores
| Source | Rating |
|---|---|
| AllMusic | 3/5 stars |
| Christgau's Record Guide | C+ |
| Rolling Stone | (not rated) |

Home is Procol Harum's fourth album, released in 1970. With the departure of organist Matthew Fisher and bassist David Knights, and the addition of bassist/organist Chris Copping to the remaining core roster of players (lead singer and pianist Gary Brooker, drummer B. J. Wilson and lead guitarist Robin Trower), Procol Harum became the Paramounts again in all but name. The purpose of bringing in Copping was to return some of the R&B sound to the band that they had had with their previous incarnation.

The initial sessions were performed in London at Trident Studios in the autumn of 1969 under the supervision of former organist Matthew Fisher, who had also produced the band's previous album. Unhappy with the sound and performances, the band scrapped the Trident sessions and began again in February 1970 with producer Chris Thomas and engineer Jeff Jarratt at Abbey Road Studios. Once the album was completed, it was decided that the cover would be a parody of a British edition of the board game snakes and ladders, featuring members of the band.

When the album was released in June 1970 it charted at No. 34 in the U.S. and No. 49 in the UK; it made the Danish Top 10, peaking at No. 6. The album was preceded by the single "Whisky Train", written by guitarist Robin Trower with lyricist Keith Reid.

== Track listing ==
All lyrics are written by Keith Reid; all music is composed by Gary Brooker, except where noted.

Side one
| No. | Title | Music | Length |
|---|---|---|---|
| 1. | "Whisky Train" | Robin Trower | 4:31 |
| 2. | "The Dead Man's Dream" | | 4:46 |
| 3. | "Still There'll Be More" | | 4:53 |
| 4. | "Nothing That I Didn't Know" | | 3:38 |
| 5. | "About to Die" | Trower | 3:35 |

Side two
| No. | Title | Length |
|---|---|---|
| 1. | "Barnyard Story" | 2:46 |
| 2. | "Piggy Pig Pig" | 4:47 |
| 3. | "Whaling Stories" | 7:06 |
| 4. | "Your Own Choice" | 3:13 |

Bonus tracks
| No. | Title | Length |
|---|---|---|
| 1. | "Still There'll Be More" (Take 3; raw track) | 4:57 |
| 2. | "Whaling Stories" (Raw track) | 7:05 |

== Salvo/Fly reissue 2009 ==
In 2009 Salvo reissued the Procol Harum catalogue and included bonus tracks for each album. "Home" included two bonus tracks selected and approved by Gary Brooker and Keith Reid, "Whaling Stories" and "Still There'll Be More". The two bonus tracks are work-in-progress mixes that lack the final overdubs from the completed versions.

== Personnel ==
Procol Harum

- Gary Brooker – vocals, piano
- Robin Trower – guitar
- Chris Copping – bass guitar, organ
- B. J. Wilson – drums
- Keith Reid – lyrics

Additional musicians

- uncredited session musicians – timbales on "Whisky Train", double bass on "The Dead Man's Dream", harmonica on "Your Own Choice"

Technical

- Jeff Jarratt – recording engineer
- Helmut Hastenteufel – sleeve design

== Charts ==
| Chart (1970–1971) | Peak position |
|---|---|
| Australian Albums (Kent Music Report) | 24 |
| Canada Top Albums/CDs (RPM) | 13 |
| UK Albums (Official Charts) | 49 |
| US Billboard 200 | 34 |
