= Take What You Need =

Studio album by Robin Trower
- Released: 1988
- Genre: Rock, blues rock
- Length: 38:09
- Label: Atlantic
- Producer: Neil Norman

Robin Trower chronology
Passion (1987)	Take What You Need (1988)	In the Line of Fire (1990)

Professional ratings
Review scores
Source	Rating
AllMusic	3/5 stars

Take What You Need is the eleventh solo studio album by Robin Trower, and the second to feature Davey Pattison on lead vocals.

== Track listing ==
No.	Title	Music	Length
1.	"Tear It Up"	Robin Trower, Dave Bronze	4:23
2.	"Take What You Need (From Me)"	Trower, Bronze	5:32
3.	"Love Attack"	Trower	3:29
4.	"I Want You Home"	Trower	3:49
5.	"Shattered"	Trower	3:20
6.	"Over You"	Trower, Bronze	5:36
7.	"Careless"	Trower, Bronze	3:39
8.	"Second Time"	Trower, Bronze	3:40
9.	"Love Won't Wait Forever"	Trower, Bronze	4:47

== Personnel ==
Robin Trower Band

- Davey Pattison – vocals
- Robin Trower – guitars
- Dave Bronze – bass
- Pete Thompson – drums

Guests

- Reg Webb – keyboards
- Robert Martin – keyboards, background vocals
- Chris Thompson – background vocals
