= What Lies Beneath (Robin Trower album) =

Studio album by Robin Trower
- Released: 2009
- Genre: Blues rock
- Length: 42:16
- Label: V-12 Records
- Producer: Livingston Brown

Robin Trower chronology
Living Out Of Time (2004)	What Lies Beneath (2009)	The Playful Heart (2010)

Professional ratings
Review scores
Source	Rating
AllMusic	3.5/5 stars

What Lies Beneath is a 2009 studio album by Robin Trower. This album is unique in that it is Trower's first album to feature himself on vocals.

== Track listing ==
No.	Title	Length
1.	"Wish You Were Mine"	4:02
2.	"What Lies Beneath"	3:30
3.	"As You Watch Each City Fall (Part 1)"	3:25
4.	"As You Watch Each City Fall (Part 2)"	2:12
5.	"Freefall"	3:05
6.	"Once the Spell Is Broken"	4:57
7.	"Sleeping On the Moon"	3:40
8.	"Time and Emotion"	4:39
9.	"Skin and Bone"	3:04
10.	"Buffalo Blues"	4:56
11.	"Find a Place"	4:51

All songs written by Robin Trower.

== Personnel ==
- Robin Trower – guitar, vocals
- Roger Cotton – organ
- Andrew Haveron & Clare Hinton – strings
- Livingston Brown – bass guitar
- Sam Van Essen – drums (tracks 1, 3–7, 10, 11)
- Chris Taggart – drums (tracks 2, 8 & 9)

== Album cover ==
- Front cover art from an original painting by Bruer Tidman
- Graphic design & packaging by EricKrauseGraphics.com
