= Robin Trower Live =

Live album by Robin Trower
- Released: March 1976
- Recorded: 3 February 1975
- Genre: Blues, rock
- Length: 41:30
- Label: Chrysalis

Robin Trower chronology
For Earth Below (1975)	Robin Trower Live (1976)	Long Misty Days (1976)

Professional ratings
Review scores
Source	Rating
AllMusic	4.5/5 stars

Robin Trower Live is a live album by Robin Trower. Recorded at the Stockholm Concert Hall in Sweden on 3 February 1975 for the Swedish Broadcasting Corporation, it was released on vinyl in 1976, and re-released on CD in 1990, 2000, and 2004. A two-CD 2026 deluxe edition has newly mixed all 12 songs in the sequence played that night on the first disc, and the original mix/sequence of 7-cut LP version on the 2nd disc. The album peaked at No. 10 the US Billboard 200. In an interview with Guitar Player in May 2006, Trower explained that the band was not aware the show was being taped, thinking they were playing for a radio broadcast only. Hence, he says, "We were loose and uninhibited, and we played one of our best shows."

== Track listing ==
All tracks composed by Robin Trower, except where indicated

Side one
No.	Title	Writer(s)	Length
1.	"Too Rolling Stoned"		6:49
2.	"Daydream"	James Dewar, Robin Trower	8:04
3.	"Rock Me Baby"	B.B. King, Joe Josea	6:24
Total length:			21:17

Side two
No.	Title	Writer(s)	Length
4.	"Lady Love"	James Dewar, Robin Trower	3:23
5.	"I Can't Wait Much Longer"	Frankie Miller, Robin Trower	7:08
6.	"Alethea"		4:13
7.	"Little Bit of Sympathy"		5:30
Total length:			20:14

== Personnel ==
- Robin Trower – guitar
- James Dewar – bass, vocals
- Bill Lordan – drums
- Trevor Kay – cover
- Brian Cooke, Jim Marshall – photography
- Geoff Emerick and Robin Trower – remix at Air Studios

== Charts ==
Chart (1976)	Peak position
Australia (Kent Music Report)	73
United Kingdom (Official Charts Company)	15
United States (Billboard 200)	10

Chart (2026)	Peak position
Scottish Albums (OCC)	28
UK Independent Albums (OCC)	17
UK Jazz & Blues Albums (OCC)	1
US Top Blues Albums (Billboard)	4
