= The Climax Chicago Blues Band =

Studio album by The Climax Chicago Blues Band
- Released: February 1969
- Recorded: 27 September – 5 November 1968
- Studios: Abbey Road Studios, London
- Genres: Blues rock; British blues
- Length: 44:53
- Labels: EMI, Parlophone
- Producer: Chris Thomas

The Climax Chicago Blues Band chronology
| The Climax Chicago Blues Band (1969) | Plays On (1969) |

Alternative cover
- Alternative reissue cover

Professional ratings
Review scores
| Source | Rating |
|---|---|
| AllMusic | 4/5 stars |

The Climax Chicago Blues Band is the debut album by Climax Blues Band (originally known as The Climax Chicago Blues Band) recorded in 1968 and released in 1969 by EMI Records (Parlophone label) under catalog number PCS 7069. It was produced by Chris Thomas and was one of his first production projects.

== Track listing ==
| No. | Title | Writer(s) | Length |
|---|---|---|---|
| 1. | "Mean Old World" | Big Bill Broonzy | 3:51 |
| 2. | "Insurance" | Waldense Hall, Charlie Singleton | 3:47 |
| 3. | "Going Down this Road" | Climax Blues Band | 3:04 |
| 4. | "You've Been Drinking" | Climax Blues Band | 2:31 |
| 5. | "Don't Start Me Talkin'" | Sonny Boy Williamson | 3:20 |
| 6. | "Wee Baby Blues" | Pete Johnson, Big Joe Turner | 3:25 |
| 7. | "Twenty Past One" (instrumental) | Climax Blues Band | 3:09 |
| 8. | "A Stranger in Your Town" | Marty Cooper, Lee Hazlewood | 4:18 |
| 9. | "How Many More Years" | Chester Burnett | 3:01 |
| 10. | "Looking for My Baby" | Climax Blues Band | 2:51 |
| 11. | "And Lonely" | Climax Blues Band | 8:49 |
| 12. | "The Entertainer (Note: Not included on the US edition)" (instrumental) | Scott Joplin | 2:47 |
| Total length: | | | 44:53 |

== Personnel ==
The Climax Chicago Blues Band

- Colin Cooper – lead vocals, harmonica
- Pete Haycock – lead and slide guitars, vocals, lead vocals (track 9)
- Derek Holt – rhythm guitar, organ, bass
- Arthur Augustin Wood – piano, organ, celesta, harmonium
- Richard Jones – bass
- George Ewart Newsome – drums

== Credits ==
- Producer – Chris Thomas
- Recorded between 27 September and 5 November 1968
- Engineers – Geoff Emerick, Jeff Jarrett
- Front design – Dave Kirk, Bob Wood
- Back design – Tony Robins
