= Beyond the Mist (Robin Trower album) =

Studio album / Live by Robin Trower
- Released: October 1985
- Recorded: 1985
- Venue: Marquee Club, Wardour Street, London
- Genre: Blues, rock
- Length: 40:03
- Label: Passport Records, Music For Nations

Robin Trower chronology
Back It Up (1983)	Beyond the Mist (1985)	Passion (1987)

Professional ratings
Review scores
Source	Rating
AllMusic	1.5/5 stars

Beyond the Mist is guitarist and songwriter Robin Trower's eleventh solo album and his first after leaving Chrysalis Records. It was released in 1985 and contains two studio tracks and five live recordings. Cover painting is by Tony Roberts.

Tracks 3 to 7 recorded live in April 1985 at The Marquee Club.

== Track listing ==
All songs written by Robin Trower, except where noted

Side one
No.	Title	Writer(s)	Length
1.	"The Last Time"	Kevin Williams, Trower	5:56
2.	"Keeping A Secret"	Reg Webb, Trower	4:16
3.	"The Voice"		4:17
4.	"Beyond The Mist"		5:30
Total length:			19:59

Side two
No.	Title	Writer(s)	Length
5.	"Time Is Short"		4:35
6.	"Back It Up"	Webb, Trower	5:00
7.	"Bridge Of Sighs"		10:29
Total length:			20:04

== Personnel ==
- Robin Trower – guitar
- Dave Bronze – bass, vocals
- Martin Clapson – drums

Technical

- Recorded and mixed by Steve Forward
