= Truce (album) =

Studio album by Robin Trower and Jack Bruce
- Released: January 1982
- Recorded: 1981
- Studio: Parkgate, Catsfield, East Sussex
- Genre: Blues, rock
- Length: 31:48
- Label: Chrysalis
- Producer: Robin Trower, Jack Bruce

Robin Trower chronology
B.L.T. (1981)	Truce (1982)	Back It Up (1983)

Jack Bruce chronology
B.L.T. (1981)	Truce (1982)	Automatic (1983)

Professional ratings
Review scores
Source	Rating
AllMusic	3.5/5 stars

Truce is a 1982 studio album by Robin Trower and Jack Bruce. It reunited Trower with drummer Reg Isidore who had played on his first two solo albums. It reached number 109 on the Billboard 200

== Track listing ==
Side one
No.	Title	Writer(s)	Length
1.	"Gonna Shut You Down"	Keith Reid, Robin Trower	3:00
2.	"Gonne Too Far"	Keith Reid, Robin Trower	3:46
3.	"Thin Ice"	Jack Bruce, Pete Brown	3:37
4.	"Last Train to the Stars"	Jack Bruce, Pete Brown, Robin Trower	3:18
5.	"Take Good Care of Yourself"	Keith Reid, Robin Trower	4:43
Total length:			18:24

Side two
No.	Title	Writer(s)	Length
6.	"Fall in Love"	Keith Reid, Robin Trower	2:38
7.	"Fat Gut"	Jack Bruce, Pete Brown	3:20
8.	"Shadows Touching"	Jack Bruce, Pete Brown	4:26
9.	"Little Boy Lost"	Keith Reid, Robin Trower	3:32
Total length:			13:24

== Personnel ==
- Robin Trower - guitar, producer
- Jack Bruce - bass, vocals, keyboards, producer
- Reg Isidore - drums

Technical

- Ike Nassau - recording engineer
