= Marquee Club =

Former music club in London, England

- The former site of the Marquee Club in Wardour Street, Soho
- Interactive map of Marquee Club
- Location: London
- Coordinates: 51°30′48″N 0°08′02″W
- Type: Nightclub
- Events: Jazz, rock

Construction
- Opened: 19 April 1958
- Closed: 2008

The Marquee Club was a music venue in London, England, that opened in 1958 with a range of jazz and skiffle acts. It was a small and relatively cheap club, in the heart of London's West End.

It was the location of the first live performance by the Rolling Stones on 12 July 1962.

== Origins ==
The club was established by Harold Pendleton, an accountant whose love of jazz had led him to become secretary of the National Jazz Federation. Originally it was located in the Marquee Ballroom in the basement of the Academy Cinema in Oxford Street, where dances had been held since the early 1950s. Its decor was designed by Angus McBean with a striped canopy to imitate a marquee. Pendleton took over management of the ballroom, and the first Jazz at the Marquee night was held on 19 April 1958. Johnny Dankworth, Chris Barber, Alexis Korner and Cyril Davies were early resident performers, and Tubby Hayes and Joe Harriott were also regular performers. In 1962 the club began a regular R&B night that occasionally featured visiting American musicians such as Muddy Waters. Pendleton also launched the National Jazz Festival in 1961 in Richmond; this was the precursor to the Reading and Leeds Festivals. By 1963 the club had become most noted for its R&B acts, including Davies, Brian Auger and Manfred Mann–who played there a record 102 times between 1962 and 1976–but Pendleton was forced to find a new venue when his lease expired.

== The 1960s: Rock roots ==
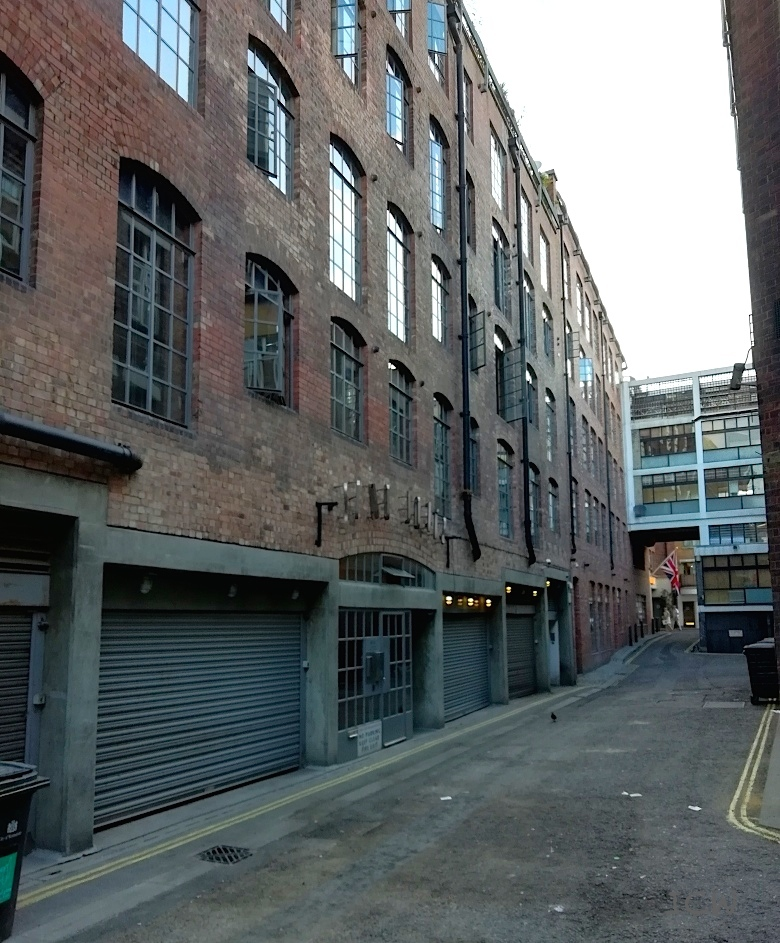
Richmond Mews, Soho (2018), where the back loading entrance to the Marquee Club was located and also where the Marquee Studios were housed.

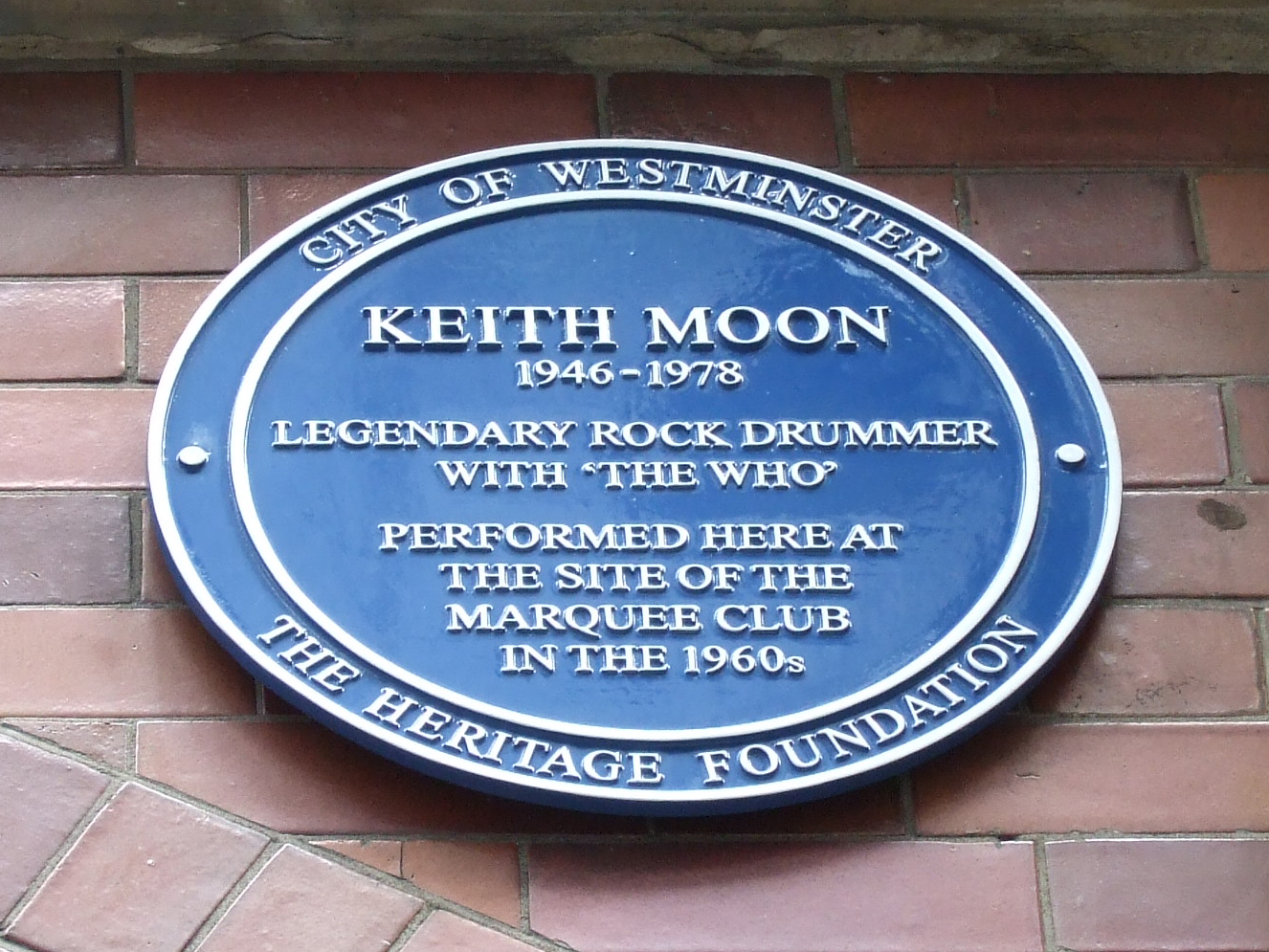
Blue plaque commemorating Keith Moon playing at the Marquee Club

In March 1964, the club moved a short distance to what became its most famous venue, with an entrance at 90 Wardour Street, and the actual music venue housed over two buildings. Almost every major rock band played on the tiny stage here over the next 25 years.

The Marquee in Wardour Street did not have an alcohol licence until 1970, hence, Simon White (manager of the Marquee Studio) and music agent Kenny Bell came up with the idea of opening a private bar called La Chasse Club at 100 Wardour Street, which Jack Barrie managed. La Chasse became the watering hole of many musicians and operated until 1973.

Band residencies during the late 1960s included Alexis Korner, Cyril Davies, Camel, Chris Barber, the Rolling Stones, the Yardbirds, Led Zeppelin, the Who, King Crimson, the Syn, Mabel Greer's Toyshop, Yes, Jethro Tull, the Jimi Hendrix Experience and Pink Floyd (who played on Sunday afternoons as part of the Spontaneous Underground club). Another band that made regular appearances was the Manish Boys, featuring David Bowie, who first played there in November 1964. Peter Green's Fleetwood Mac gave their first performance there in 1967. To find out who was playing on any given night, you could just call in at the 'Ship' pub a few doors away.

In 1964, Moody Blues manager/producer Alex Murray used a homemade studio in the garage at the back of the club to produce the classic "Go Now" single, which shot to No. 1 at Christmas 1964, and filmed for it the first ever UK pop promo video. The studio was later used by Elton John, the Groundhogs, the Clash and others. The Rolling Stones, who first appeared at the club on 12 July 1962, returned there on 26 March 1971 to film a concert for American television, later released as From the Vault: The Marquee Club Live in 1971.

John Gee, a former accountant and journalist, became the manager of the Marquee Club during the 1960s and was a pivotal part of helping create what the Melody Maker termed "the most important venue in the history of pop music". Gee championed certain groups that played at the club such as Ten Years After and Jethro Tull, and wrote the liner notes for Ten Years After's eponymous 1967 debut album. Jethro Tull named the B-side of their second single, "A Song For Jeffrey", a jazz-flavoured instrumental, "One for John Gee". Gee introduced the bands to the audience before they appeared on stage. He left the Marquee Club in 1970 to take a job in the offices of Radio Luxembourg. Jack Barrie, who was the manager of the Soho bar La Chasse, took over as the manager of the Marquee in 1970.

== The 1970s ==
The Marquee Club also nurtured a large social scene based around the record industry, with record company heads and their A&R representatives visiting the venue on a daily basis, often talent spotting. The venue also attracted many famous musicians and recording artists who simply used the VIP Bar to socialise in. The Marquee staff became an integral part of the club as much as the bands that performed there.

The Faces performed at The Marquee on 7 December 1970. Queen performed at the club three times in the beginning of their career. First on 8 January 1971, then on 20 December 1972, and on 9 April 1973, as their first gig after signing with the Trident record company. In 1972, Status Quo's performance of "Paper Plane" was filmed for a music video. On 18, 19, and 20 October 1973, Be-Bop Deluxe and String Driven Thing appeared on the same bill in 1974, David Bowie filmed The 1980 Floor Show at the Marquee for the American NBC TV late night show The Midnight Special. NBC used the Marquee Studios (housed beside the venue) as dressing rooms for the cast.

Although never a seminal punk venue, the club nevertheless embraced the burgeoning punk rock movement of the late 1970s and regularly promoted punk and new wave nights into the 1980s. Bands such as Doctors of Madness appeared frequently throughout the mid-70's, often supported by future star bands such as The Jam. Mainstream rock acts appeared regularly at the venue.

== The 1980s ==
During the early to mid-1980s the Marquee became an important venue to the new wave of British heavy metal (NWOBHM). Def Leppard played their first show on the Pyromania World Tour here, and included a different setlist from the rest of the shows on that tour. There was a glam revival spearheaded by Hanoi Rocks, the Babysitters, the Quireboys and others. NWOBHM bands, such as Angel Witch, Diamond Head, Girlschool, Witchfynde, Rock Goddess, Silverwing and Praying Mantis were regulars. Iron Maiden played a string of the dates at the club in 1980 and were filmed performing for LWT documentary 20th Century Box (introduced by a very young Danny Baker). Metallica performed their first UK show at the venue on 27 March 1984. In April 1985 Robin Trower recorded the majority of his live album Beyond the Mist at the Marquee Club. (The album also includes two new studio tracks and an extended 10-minute version of "Bridge of Sighs".)

The Marquee was the central venue of the progressive rock revival of the early 1980s. It was here that the then-unsigned Marillion began to gain a wider fan base and press interest by playing frequent two-night residencies to a sold-out crowd. Other neo-prog acts of the time regularly headlining at the club included Twelfth Night, Solstice and Pallas, often supported by acts such as Pendragon or IQ who would in later years become leading lights of the neo-prog scene. Other progressive bands regularly playing the Marquee at this time included Quasar, Mach One, Haze, Cardiacs, Legacy of Lies and Liaison (who were not strictly prog but seemed to become linked to the movement).

During this period the club held heats and the final of Melody Maker's "band contests". New wave and indie bands appeared, including "Two Pints of Lager and a Packet of Crisps Please" one-hit wonders Splodgenessabounds and the almost-cult band the Hummers. In September 1983, British singer-songwriter Howard Jones recorded a full concert at the Marquee during his first headline tour; the show was later remixed and released for the first time in 2026 as the live album Live at the Marquee. In 1985, Wham! filmed the video for "I'm Your Man" there, clearly showing the Marquee name.

The band Genesis also performed at the Marquee during their 1982 Abacab Encore tour. At the Marquee, they signed as Garden Wall.

On 5 March 1983, Twisted Sister recorded their performance at the Marquee. Although initially intended to be released as a live album in 1983, this idea did not materialize. Instead, select songs were included as B-sides of singles from the You Can't Stop Rock 'n' Roll studio album, released that year. Six songs from this performance were included on Twisted Sister's Big Hits and Nasty Cuts greatest hits compilation, released in 1992. The full concert was released as Live At The Marquee Club in 2011.

On 19, 22 and 28 June 1987, Guns N' Roses performed at the Marquee. A live version of Knockin' On Heaven's Door, recorded at the Marquee, was released as a B-side to Nightrain, in July 1989.

== Final location, closure and subsequent re-use of the name ==
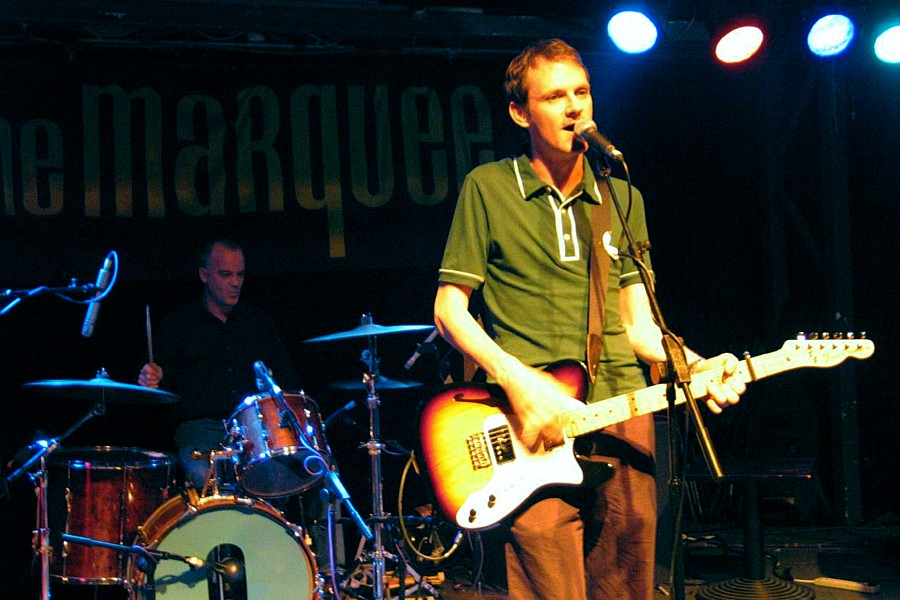
Ballboy at the Marquee Club on 13 August 2005

In 1988, Harold Pendleton sold the club to Billy Gaff, the former manager of Rod Stewart. The Wardour Street site was sold for redevelopment (it is now Meza and Floridita with a cigar retail shop, Spanish restaurant and Cuban restaurant and some flats), and the Marquee Club was forced to move again, this time to a larger venue at the former Cambridge Circus Cinematograph Theatre, 105 Charing Cross Road. The location was opened on 16 August 1988 by Kiss, who played a warm up gig ahead of their second headliner slot at The Monsters of Rock festival at Donnington. During this period, American progressive metal band Dream Theater recorded their first live album, Live at the Marquee, at the venue on 23 April 1993. Additionally, the American group All Mod Cons: A Tribute to The Jam, drew the largest ever crowd at this location in October 1993. This site was subsequently bought for redevelopment and the club closed in 1996. A Wetherspoons pub named "The Montagu Pyke" now occupies the building. In 1992, Marquee Club also used by Europe for their Halfway to Heaven song's videoclip.

The Marquee was relocated in 2001 by Billy Gaff and entrepreneur Doug Palfreeman to Angel, Islington, in a purpose-built space. It was then sold on to Dave Stewart of the Eurythmics. However, with Stewart's team this hit financial difficulties and closed in 2003, less than a year after it had opened. It is now O2 Academy Islington.

Under new owner entrepreneur Nathan Lowry, the Marquee Club re-opened in 2004 in Leicester Square above MTV's TRL studio. Jimmy Page re-opened the club. The opening night was called the Breakthrough Weekender featuring dozens of new and unsigned artists. A Jimi Hendrix exhibition ran for three months featuring a large collection of original guitars and unseen footage at the club, before being auctioned by Mick Fleetwood's auction company Fleetwood Owen. The club featured over 500 new and established bands during its time here, including Razorlight, the Feeling, and the Magic Numbers. Many music industry launches were held at the club including the Download Festival featuring Ozzy, Green Day, Billy Idol and Snow Patrol. Both MTV and the club closed with the Marquee citing licensing problems with Westminster Council. It continued as a pop up in St Martin's Lane for another year until closing in 2008. Lowry continues to hold the brand rights. The last artist to headline The Marquee at this venue were Essex based unsigned rockers Torn Asunder.

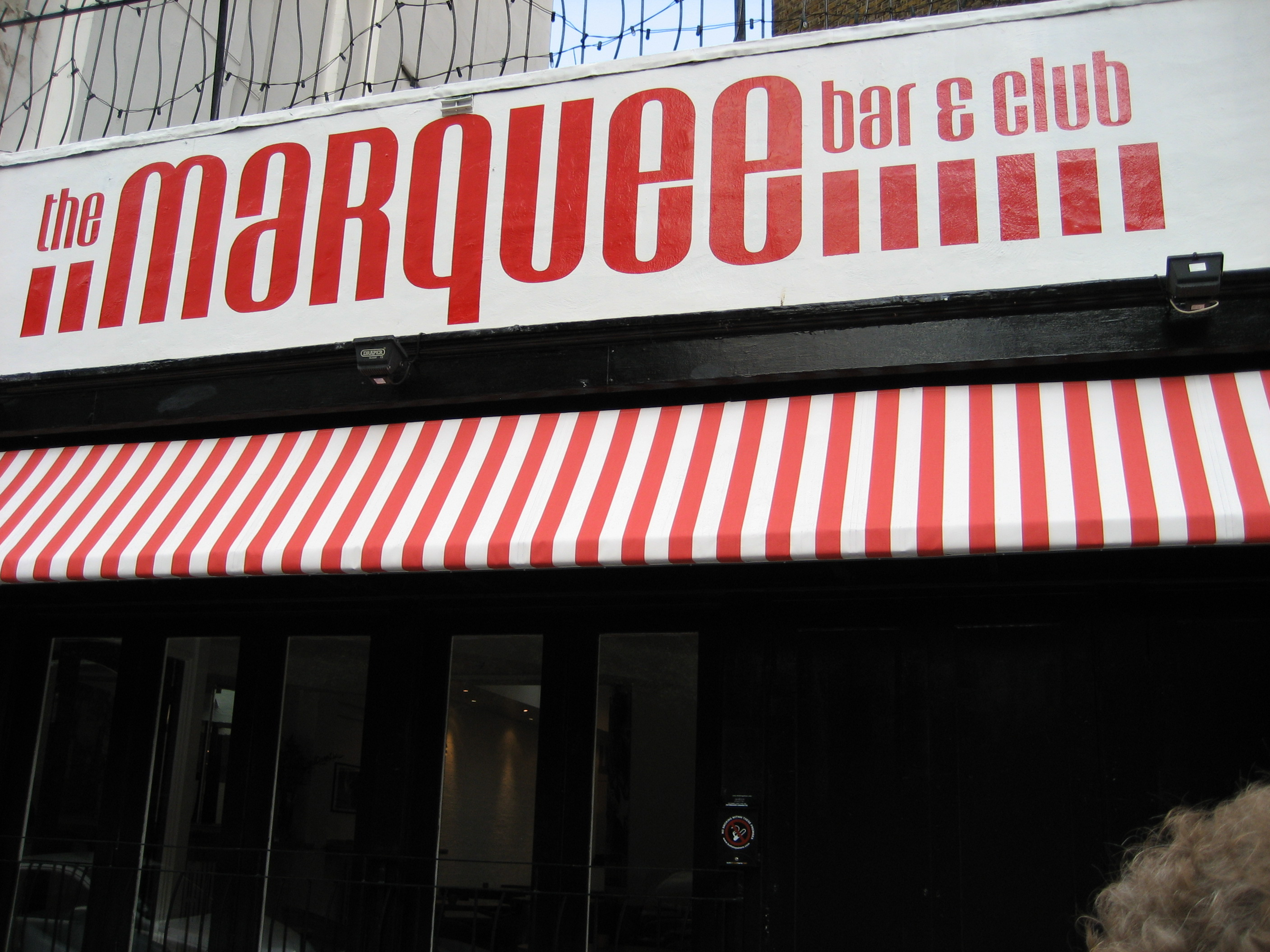
Former entrance to the Marquee Club on Upper Saint Martin’s Lane

== General and cited references ==
- Bob Brunning (1986) Blues: The British Connection, London: Helter Skelter, 2002. ISBN 1-900924-41-2
- Bob Brunning, The Fleetwood Mac Story: Rumours and Lies, Omnibus Press, 2004, foreword by B.B. King
- Dick Heckstall-Smith (2004) The Safest Place in the World: A Personal History of British Rhythm and blues, Clear Books, ISBN 0-7043-2696-5. First Edition: Blowing The Blues – Fifty Years Playing The British Blues
- Christopher Hjort Strange Brew !Eric Clapton and the British blues boom, 1965–1970, foreword by John Mayall, Jawbone (2007). ISBN 1-906002-00-2
- Paul Myers: Long John Baldry and the Birth of the British Blues, Vancouver: GreyStone Books, 2007
- Harry Shapiro Alexis Korner: The Biography, London: Bloomsbury Publishing PLC, 1997. Discography by Mark Troster
