= 20th Century Blues (Robin Trower album) =

Studio album by Robin Trower
- Released: 1994
- Genre: Blues rock
- Length: 50:33
- Label: V-12
- Producer: Derek Sutton

Robin Trower chronology
In the Line of Fire (1990)	20th Century Blues (1994)	Living Out Of Time (2004)

20th Century Blues is the thirteenth solo studio album by Robin Trower.

== Album cover ==
This was the sixth album cover created by Paul Olsen. When asked to create a cover for the album, Olsen presented transparencies of a batch of paintings, intending for the photos to be a starting point. However, Trower picked a specific one that he wanted. Afterwards, Olsen researched the original design, and discovered he had actually created the basic design in 1974, yet had not painted it until 1990. Ironically, it was originally an alternative he had done for the Long Misty Days cover, but had never shown to Trower because he preferred the autumn leaf design. Therefore, Trower had unknowingly selected a design that was meant for him almost twenty years earlier.

== Track listing ==
All songs written by Robin Trower, except "Reconsider Baby".

No.	Title	Music	Length
1.	"20th Century Blues"		3:13
2.	"Prisoner of Love"		3:43
3.	"Precious Gift"		4:03
4.	"Whisper up a Storm"		4:02
5.	"Extermination Blues"		4:51
6.	"Step into the Dark"		6:08
7.	"Rise up Like the Sun"		3:05
8.	"Secret Place"		4:34
9.	"Chase the Bone"		3:20
10.	"Promise You the Stars"		3:38
11.	"Don't Lose Faith in Tomorrow"		5:40
12.	"Reconsider Baby"	Lowell Fulson	4:29

== Personnel ==
- Robin Trower – guitar
- Livingstone Brown – bass, vocals, keyboards
- Mayuyu – drums
