= Broken Barricades =

Studio album by Procol Harum
- Released: April 1971 (US)
- Recorded: February–March 1971
- Studios: AIR, London
- Genre: Rock
- Length: 35:06
- Label: Chrysalis
- Producer: Chris Thomas

Procol Harum chronology
Home (1970)	Broken Barricades (1971)	Procol Harum Live: In Concert with the Edmonton Symphony Orchestra (1972)

Singles from Broken Barricades
- 1. "Broken Barricades" / "Power Failure" Released: July 1971 (US); 2. "Simple Sister" Released: September 1971 (US)

Professional ratings
Review scores
Source	Rating
AllMusic	4/5 stars
Christgau's Record Guide	C−

Broken Barricades is the fifth album by the English rock band Procol Harum, released the same week they began their U.S. tour, in April 1971. The UK release was on 11 June 1971. It was guitarist Robin Trower's last recording with the group until The Prodigal Stranger (1991).

"Song for a Dreamer" is a tribute to Jimi Hendrix from Trower, who was stunned by Hendrix's death in September 1970.

== Cover ==
The cut-out cover was designed by C.C.S. Associates (a leading creative design team in London producing promotional ideas and album cover artwork for A&M, Chrysalis, Charisma, Island and Trojan Records. The primary CCS designers were Harry Isles, John Bonis, and William Neal). Photography was by Peter Sanders.

Images from left to right are: Gary Brooker, Chris Copping, Robin Trower, and B. J. Wilson.

== Track listing ==
All lyrics are written by Keith Reid.

Side one
No.	Title	Music	Length
1.	"Simple Sister"	Gary Brooker	5:52
2.	"Broken Barricades"	Brooker	3:13
3.	"Memorial Drive"	Robin Trower	3:47
4.	"Luskus Delph"	Brooker	3:48

Side two
No.	Title	Music	Length
5.	"Power Failure"	Brooker	4:33
6.	"Song for a Dreamer"	Trower	5:40
7.	"Playmate of the Mouth"	Brooker	5:06
8.	"Poor Mohammed"	Trower	3:07
Total length:			35:06

2002 Repertoire Records remastered edition bonus tracks
No.	Title	Music	Length
9.	"Broken Barricades" (single edit)	Brooker	2:35
10.	"Power Failure" (single edit)	Brooker	3:12
11.	"Simple Sister" (mono version)	Brooker	5:48
Total length:			46:32

2009 Salvo remastered edition bonus tracks
No.	Title	Music	Length
9.	"Broken Barricades" (long fade – raw track)	Brooker	3:57
10.	"Simple Sister" (raw track)	Brooker	5:49
11.	"Poor Mohammed" (backing track)	Trower	2:43
12.	"Song for a Dreamer (King Jimi)" (backing track)	Trower	4:56
Total length:			52:50

== Personnel ==
=== Procol Harum ===
- Gary Brooker – piano, vocals (except "Song for a Dreamer" and "Poor Mohammed")
- Robin Trower – guitar, lead vocals on "Song for a Dreamer" and "Poor Mohammed"
- Chris Copping – bass, organ
- B. J. Wilson – drums
- Keith Reid – lyrics

=== Technical personnel ===
- Chris Thomas – producer
- John Punter – engineer
- C.C.S. Associates – artwork, design
- Pete Sanders – photography

== Charts ==
Chart (1971)	Peak position
Canada Top Albums/CDs (RPM)	27
Danish Albums (Hitlisten)	5
German Albums (Offizielle Top 100)	46
UK Albums (Official Charts)	42
US Billboard 200	32
