= Passion (Robin Trower album) =

Studio album by Robin Trower
- Released: April 1987
- Genre: Blues rock
- Length: 35:58
- Label: GNP Crescendo
- Producer: Neil Norman

Robin Trower chronology
Beyond the Mist (1985)	Passion (1987)	Take What You Need (1988)

Professional ratings
Review scores
Source	Rating
AllMusic	2/5 stars

Passion is a 1987 studio album by Robin Trower. The album received positive reviews and was followed by a US tour. The album was honored with a first place award in the Rock category by the American Association of Independent Music.

== Track listing ==
All tracks by Robin Trower and Dave Bronze except where noted

Side one
No.	Title	Writer(s)	Length
1.	"Caroline"	Bronze, Webb, Trower	4:00
2.	"Secret Doors"	Webb, Trower	4:18
3.	"If Forever"		3:36
4.	"Won't Even Think About You"		4:40
Total length:			16:34

Side two
No.	Title	Writer(s)	Length
5.	"Passion"		3:56
6.	"No Time"	Bronze, Webb, Trower	4:20
7.	"Night"	Trower	3:57
8.	"Bad Time"		3:26
9.	"One More Word"		3:45
Total length:			15:28

== Personnel ==
- Davey Pattison – lead vocals
- Robin Trower – guitars
- Dave Bronze – bass, bass synth, vocals
- Reg Webb – keyboards
- Robert A. Martin – keyboards, backing vocals
- Pete Thompson – drums
- Paul Warren – backing vocals
