= Twice Removed from Yesterday =

Studio album by Robin Trower
- Released: March 1973
- Genres: Blues rock, hard rock
- Length: 43:55
- Label: Chrysalis/Capitol
- Producer: Matthew Fisher

Robin Trower chronology
Twice Removed from Yesterday (1973)	Bridge of Sighs (1974)

Professional ratings
Review scores
Source	Rating
AllMusic	4/5 stars

Twice Removed from Yesterday is the English guitarist and songwriter Robin Trower's first solo album. It was released in March 1973. Cover art is by "Funky" Paul Olsen. The album was re-released on CD in 1990 by Capitol.

The album was reissued in 2023. It includes 2023 remaster, outtake, alternate mixes and tracks recorded at "John Peel Show" on 26 March 1973.

== Track listing ==
All tracks are written by James Dewar and Robin Trower, except where noted.

Side one
No.	Title	Writer(s)	Length
1.	"I Can't Wait Much Longer"	Frankie Miller, Robin Trower	5:25
2.	"Daydream"		6:28
3.	"Hannah"	James Dewar, Reg Isidore, Robin Trower	5:30
4.	"Man of the World"		2:40
Total length:			20:03

Side two
No.	Title	Writer(s)	Length
5.	"I Can't Stand It"		3:43
6.	"Rock Me Baby"	B.B. King, Joe Josea	4:30
7.	"Twice Removed from Yesterday"		3:58
8.	"Sinner's Song"		5:25
9.	"Ballerina"		3:45
Total length:			20:41

=== 50th Anniversary Edition ===
2023 reissue - disc one: remaster
No.	Title	Length

2023 reissue - disc two - bonus tracks
No.	Title	Writer(s)	Length
1.	"Take A Fast Train (Single, B-Side of "Man of the World")"		3:16
2.	"Man Of The World (Alt Mix)"		2:35
3.	"Hannah (Rough Mix)"	James Dewar, Reg Isidore, Robin Trower	5:27
4.	"Ballerina (Rough Mix)"		4:10
5.	"Twice Removed From Yesterday"		3:50
6.	"Man Of The World"		2:32
7.	"Daydream"		6:10
8.	"Sinners Song"		4:10

Tracks 5 to 8 are from a John Peel BBC Session recorded on 26th March 1973.

== Personnel ==
- Robin Trower – guitar; additional vocals on "Twice Removed from Yesterday"
- James Dewar – bass, lead vocals
- Reg Isidore – drums
- Matthew Fisher – organ on "I Can't Wait Much Longer" and "Daydream"; producer
