= Back It Up (Robin Trower album) =

Studio album by Robin Trower
- Released: July 1983
- Recorded: Wessex, London
- Genre: Rock
- Length: 38:18
- Label: Chrysalis
- Producer: Robin Trower

Robin Trower chronology
Truce (1982)	Back It Up (1983)	Beyond the Mist (1985)

Back It Up is a 1983 studio album by Robin Trower, and the last to feature James Dewar. It was after this album was released that Trower was dropped by Chrysalis Records because he did not tour to support the album, in addition to the album's lack of radio airplay.

Professional ratings
Review scores
Source	Rating
Allmusic	3/5 stars

== Track listing ==
Side one
No.	Title	Writer(s)	Length
1.	"Back It Up"	Robin Trower, Reg Webb	3:51
2.	"River"	Robin Trower, James Dewar	3:48
3.	"Black To Red"	Robin Trower	2:54
4.	"Benny Dancer"	Robin Trower, James Dewar	8:54
Total length:			19:27

Side two
No.	Title	Writer(s)	Length
5.	"Time Is Short"	Robin Trower	3:30
6.	"Islands"	Robin Trower	4:03
7.	"None But The Brave"	Robin Trower, Keith Reid	2:35
8.	"Captain Midnight"	Robin Trower, James Dewar	3:06
9.	"Settling The Score"	Robin Trower, Keith Reid	5:16
Total length:			18:30

== Personnel ==
- Robin Trower - guitar, producer
- James Dewar - bass (tracks 1 and 6), vocals
- Dave Bronze - bass (tracks 2–5, 7–9)
- Alan Clarke - drums (tracks 1 and 6)
- Bob Clouter - drums (tracks 2–5, 7–9)
- Jon Walls - recording engineer, mix engineer
