= James Dewar (musician) =

Scottish singer and bassist (1942–2002)

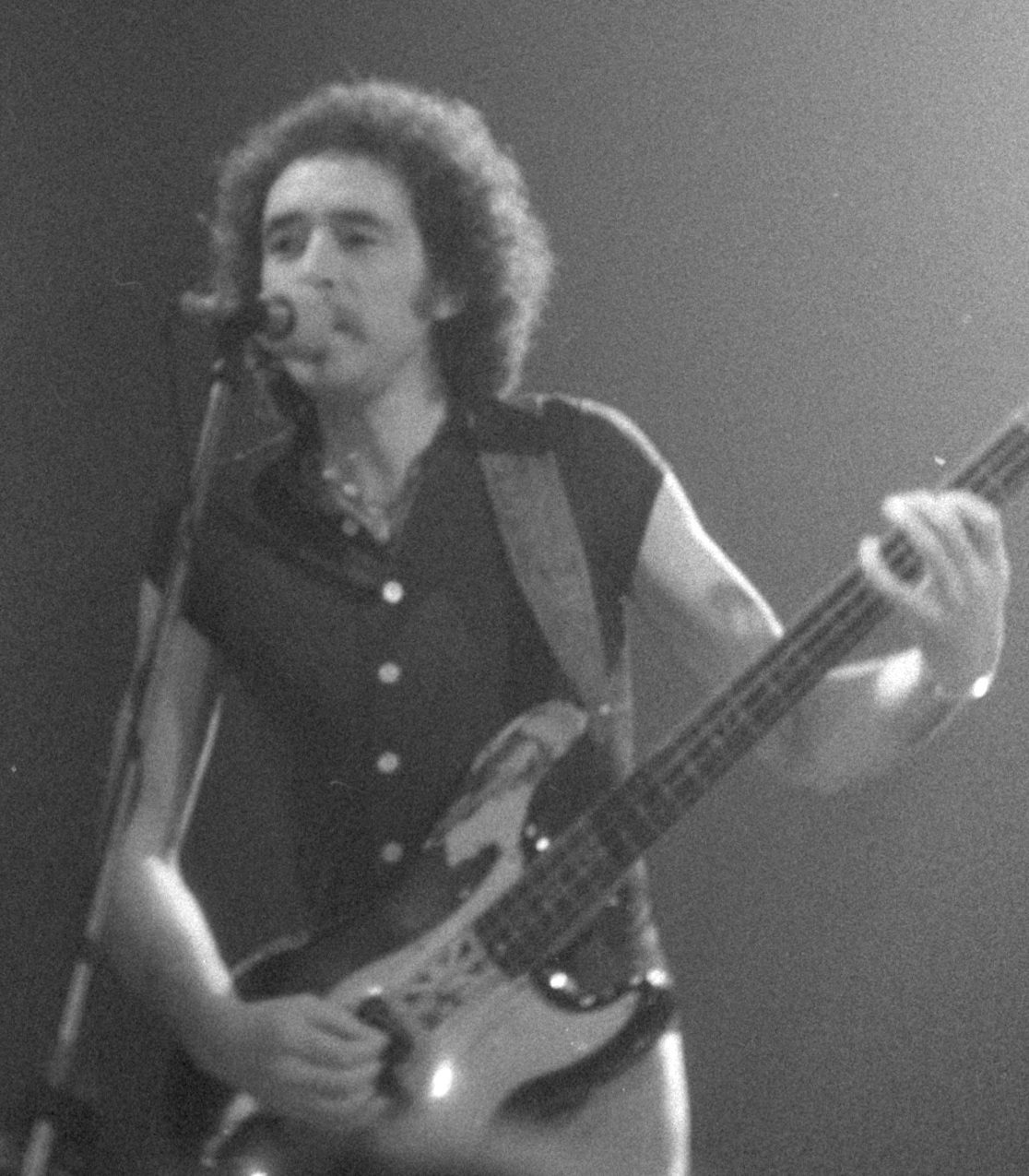
- Dewar in the 1970s

Background information
- Born: 12 October 1942; Glasgow, Scotland
- Died: 16 May 2002 (aged 59) Paisley, Renfrewshire, Scotland
- Genres: Hard rock, blues-rock, blue-eyed soul
- Occupations: Musician, singer, songwriter
- Instruments: Vocals, bass
- Years active: Early 1960s–1987
- Formerly of: Stone the Crows; The Luvvers; Robin Trower Band

James Dewar (12 October 1942 – 16 May 2002) was a Scottish musician best known as the bassist and vocalist for Robin Trower and Stone the Crows, the latter having its beginnings as the resident band at Burns Howff in Glasgow.

== Biography ==
Dewar's career began with Lulu and the Luvvers in the early 1960s. His career eventually reached its zenith with the Robin Trower Band, a British rock power trio, after the 1974 release of the album Bridge of Sighs.

Dewar made his mark as an acclaimed blue-eyed soul singer, performing in front of sold-out stadiums and concert halls at the crest of the 1970s classic rock era. The Scot had a rich, powerful voice, with a soulful timbre and has been regarded by critics as one of the most under-rated rock vocalists. His vocal sound was deep, gritty and resonating, his style shows the influence of Ray Charles and Otis Redding. Like Paul Rodgers and Frankie Miller, his voice evoked a bluesy, soul-inspired sound.

Dewar and Trower parted ways in 1983 when Trower was dropped by Chrysalis Records. Dewar recorded his one solo album, Stumbledown Romancer, during the 1970s at the height of his career, but it was not released until two decades later. He collaborated primarily with former Procol Harum organist Matthew Fisher on the album, with the title track relating a hard-luck story.

At Dykebar Hospital in Paisley, Scotland, Dewar died in May 2002 of a stroke after years of disability resulting from a rare medical condition, CADASIL, which caused a series of strokes. His funeral was held at Paisley's Woodside Crematorium.

== Discography ==
=== With Stone the Crows ===
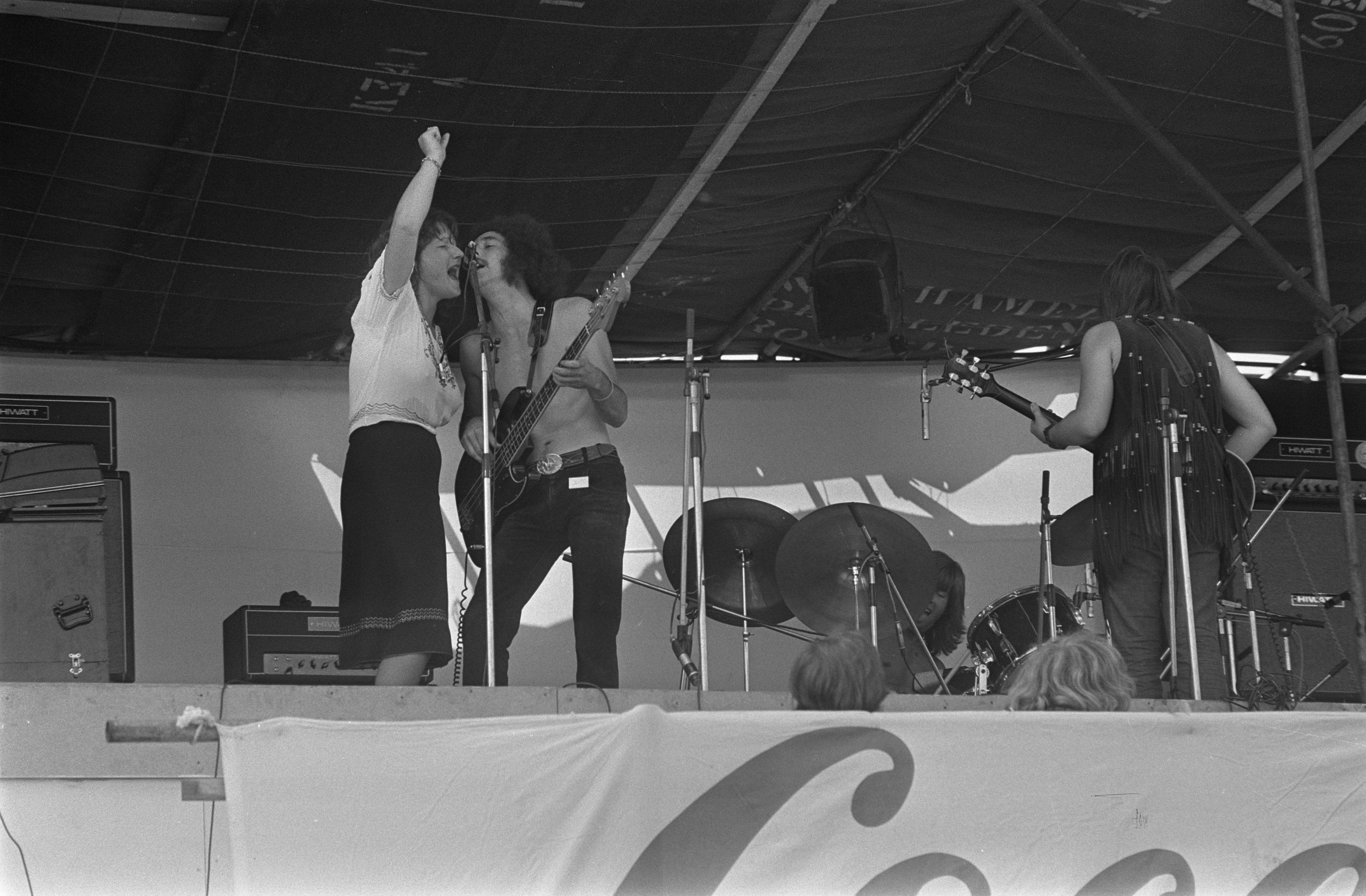
Dewar with Stone the Crows in 1970

on bass:

- 1970: Stone the Crows
- 1970: Ode to John Law

=== With Robin Trower Band ===
as lead singer and bassist (except where noted):

- 1973: Twice Removed from Yesterday
- 1974: Bridge of Sighs
- 1975: For Earth Below
- 1976: Robin Trower Live!
- 1976: Long Misty Days
- 1977: In City Dreams (lead singer only)
- 1978: Caravan to Midnight (lead singer only)
- 1980: Victims of the Fury
- 1983: Back It Up

=== Solo ===
- 1998: Stumbledown Romancer
- 2015: Word for Word CD single
