= In City Dreams =

Studio album by Robin Trower
- Released: 15 June 1977
- Recorded: Criteria, Miami, Florida
- Genres: Rock, jazz rock
- Length: 37:50
- Label: Chrysalis
- Producer: Don Davis

Robin Trower chronology
Long Misty Days (1976)	''In City Dreams'' (1977)	Caravan to Midnight (1978)

Professional ratings
Review scores
Source	Rating
AllMusic	3/5 stars
The Rolling Stone Album Guide	2.5/5 stars

In City Dreams is guitarist and songwriter Robin Trower's fifth solo studio album, released in 1977. James Dewar passed the bass playing duties over to Rustee Allen and concentrated on vocals. It was certified gold by the RIAA on 18 November 1977.

== Track listing ==
All tracks composed by Robin Trower and James Dewar, except where indicated.

Side one

1. "Somebody Calling" – 4:56
2. "Sweet Wine of Love" – 2:57
3. "Bluebird" – 5:32
4. "Falling Star" – 2:45
5. "Farther On Up the Road" (Don Robey, Joe Veasey) – 2:33

Side two

1. "Smile" – 4:45
2. "Little Girl"– 4:51
3. "Love's Gonna Bring You Round" – 4:36
4. "In City Dreams" – 5:14

== Personnel ==
- Robin Trower – guitar
- James Dewar – vocals
- Rustee Allen – bass
- Bill Lordan – drums

== Charts ==
Chart (1977)	Peak position
United Kingdom (Official Charts Company)	58
United States (Billboard 200)	25
