= Robin Trower =

English guitarist (born 1945)

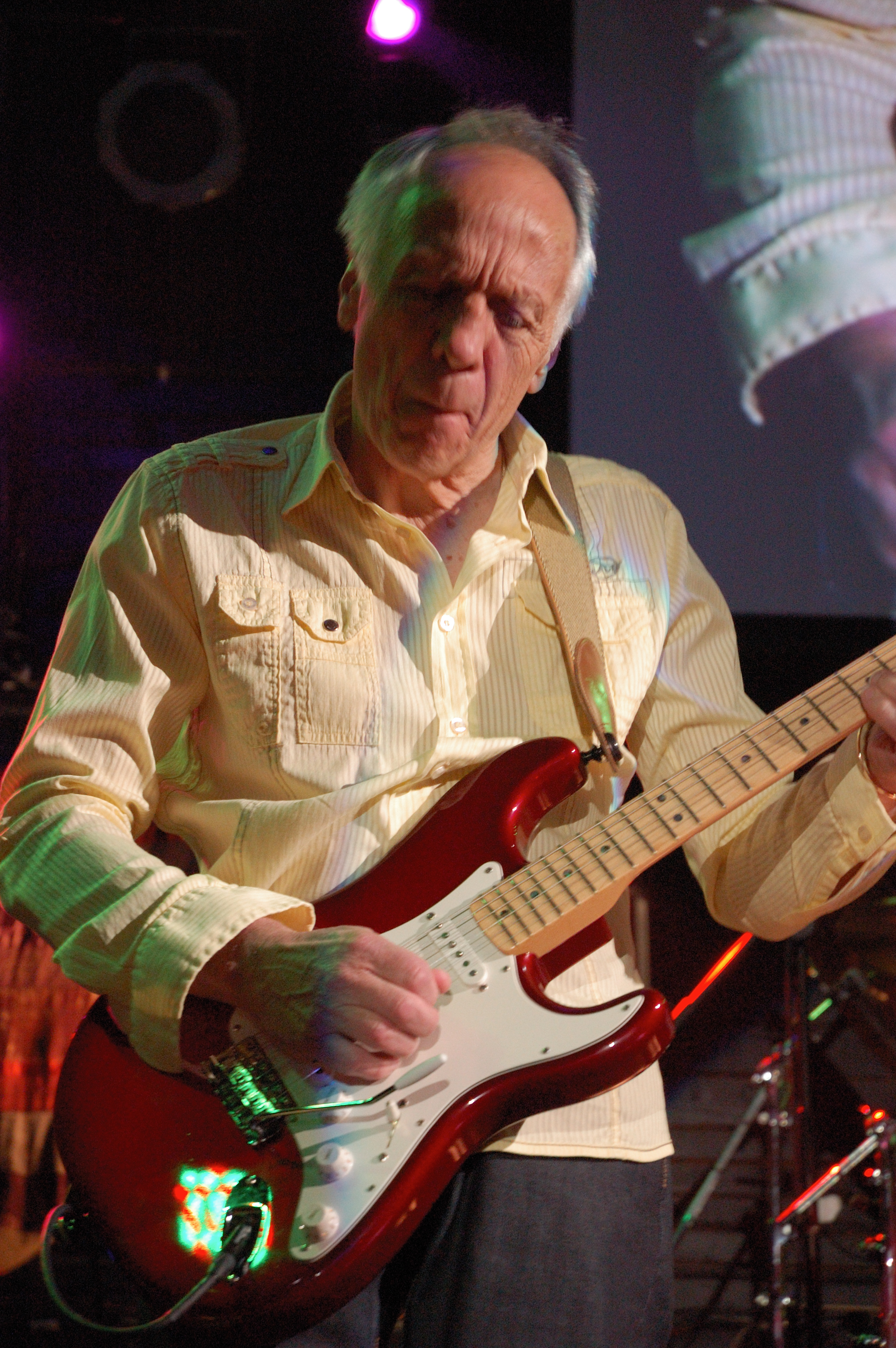
- Trower performing in 2009

Background information
- Born: Robin Leonard Trower; 9 March 1945 (age 81); Catford, London, England
- Genres: Blues rock; hard rock
- Occupations: Musician; songwriter; bandleader; producer
- Instruments: Guitar; vocals
- Years active: 1962–present
- Labels: Chrysalis, Atlantic, Mascot
- Member of: Robin Trower Band
- Formerly of: Procol Harum; The Paramounts
- Website: trowerpower.com

Robin Leonard Trower (born 9 March 1945) is an English rock guitarist and producer who achieved success with Procol Harum from 1967 until 1971 and as the bandleader of his own power trio known as the Robin Trower Band.

Although Procol Harum was primarily known as a progressive rock band, Trower himself is known for his blues-infused guitar playing, which critics have frequently compared to that of Jimi Hendrix, whom he has cited as an influence.

As a solo artist, Trower released four consecutive gold-certified albums from 1974 to 1977 that charted well in the US and Canada, but in the 1980s his career faltered. He briefly returned to Procol Harum for their 1991 reunion album, The Prodigal Stranger, but left again to resume his solo career. His most recent solo album, Come and Find Me, was released in 2025.

== Early life ==
Robin Trower was born in Catford, London, England, and grew up in Southend-on-Sea, Essex.

== Career ==
In 1962, he formed a band that became the Paramounts, later including Westcliff High School pupil Gary Brooker. The Paramounts disbanded in 1966 to pursue individual projects. During this time, Trower created a local three-piece band called the Jam (not to be confused with the later group with Paul Weller). He also unsuccessfully tried forming a band with Wilko Johnson, who had instead decided to attend university. Trower then, in June 1967, joined Brooker's new band Procol Harum following the success of their debut May 1967 single "A Whiter Shade of Pale", and remained with them until mid 1971, appearing on the group's first five albums. Trower wrote "Whisky Train," the lead single from the group's fourth album, Home, and wrote three songs on the subsequent album, Broken Barricades. However, as Trower later confessed, "I started to realise that I was coming up with a lot more ideas than Procol had room for, so I was driven to go forward into my own thing."

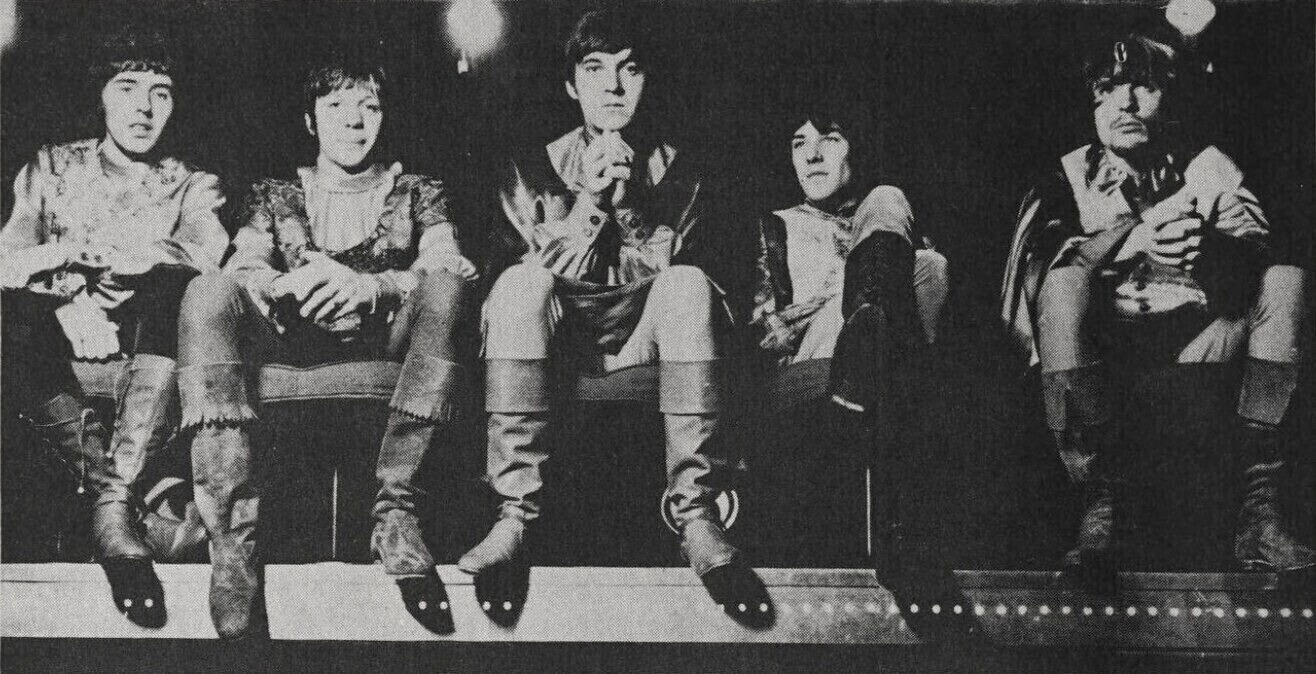
Trower (second from left) with Procol Harum c. early 1968

"I look back very fondly. We made some great tracks and good albums. I think of it mostly as my schooling. I learned about recording and doing big tours, which I couldn’t have learned if I had started with a solo career."

— Robin Trower, reflecting upon his Procol Harum years in a 2019 interview

Before launching his eponymous band, he joined singer Frankie Miller, ex-Stone the Crows bassist/singer James Dewar, and former Jethro Tull drummer Clive Bunker to form the short-lived combo Jude. This outfit did not record and soon split up.

Trower retained Dewar as his bassist (who also took on lead vocals) and recruited drummer Reg Isidore (later replaced by Bill Lordan) to form the Robin Trower Band in 1973. In 1974, the group released Bridge of Sighs. This album, along with his first and third solo album, was produced by his former Procol Harum bandmate, organist Matthew Fisher. His early power trio work was noted for Jimi Hendrix influences. Trower is an influential guitarist who has inspired other guitar legends such as Robert Fripp, who praised him for his string bending and the quality of his sounds, and took lessons from him.

In the early 1980s, Trower teamed up with former Cream bassist Jack Bruce and his previous drummers Lordan and Isidore for two albums, BLT (Bruce, Lordan, Trower) and Truce (Trower, Bruce, Isidore). After those albums, he released another album with James Dewar on vocals titled Back It Up in 1983. Robin Trower was dropped from Chrysalis Records afterwards.

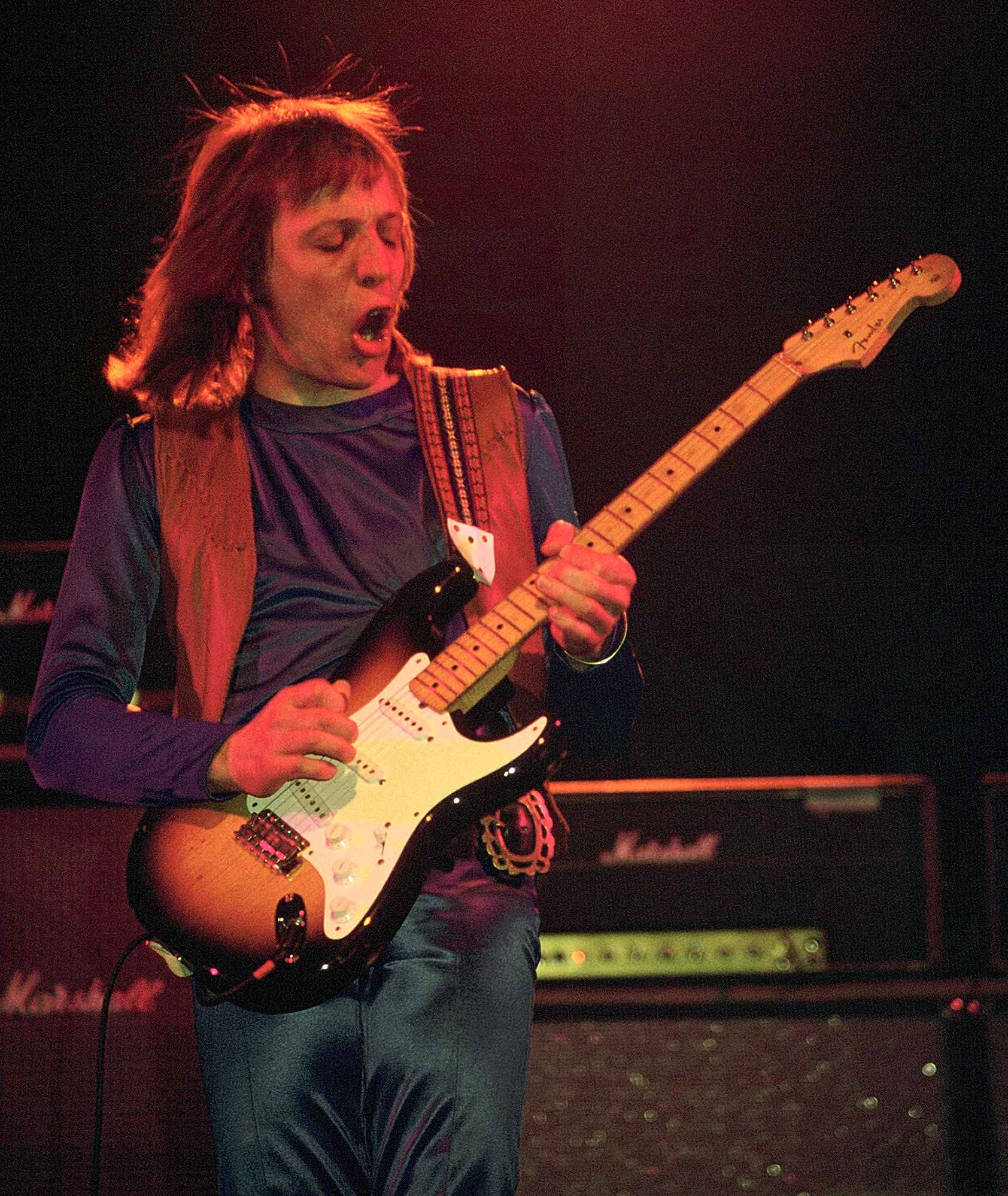
Trower in 1975

Trower was also a part of the Night of the Guitars II European tour in 1991, organized by Sting and The Police manager Miles Copeland. The tour featured Ronnie Montrose, Rick Derringer, Saga's Ian Crichton, Dave Sharman, Jan Akkerman and Laurie Wisefield.

Thirteen albums later, Trower's album Living Out of Time (2003) featured the return of veteran bandmates Dave Bronze on bass, vocalist Davey Pattison (formerly with Ronnie Montrose's band Gamma) and Pete Thompson on drums—the same line-up as the mid-1980s albums Passion and Take What You Need.

With the same bandmates, Trower gave a concert on his 60th birthday in Bonn, Germany. The concert was recorded by the German television channel WDR. It was then released on DVD and subsequently on CD throughout Europe and later the US under the title Living Out of Time: Live. Trower toured the United States and Canada in the summer and autumn of 2006.

In 2007, Trower released a third recording with Jack Bruce, Seven Moons, featuring Gary Husband on drums. A 2008 world tour began in Ft. Pierce, Florida, on 16 January 2008. Joining Davey Pattison and Pete Thompson was Glenn Letsch (formerly of Gamma) playing bass. European dates began in April. The show of 29 March 2008 at the Royal Oak Music Theater in Royal Oak, Michigan, was released as a double album on V12 Records.

Trower has described James Brown as his "big hero", particularly Brown's early work "where blues is crossing over into rock and roll".

In 2016, he enjoyed a successful tour of the US. On 20 March 2018, Trower played a show at the Maryland Hall for the Creative Arts in Annapolis, Maryland. Ten minutes later (approximately 9:00PM EDT) after playing back-to-back songs "Day of the Eagle" and "Bridge of Sighs", he announced on his microphone that he was not feeling well (he had flu symptoms), handed his guitar to a stage crew, walked backstage and collapsed. He was transported by ambulance to the hospital for treatment.

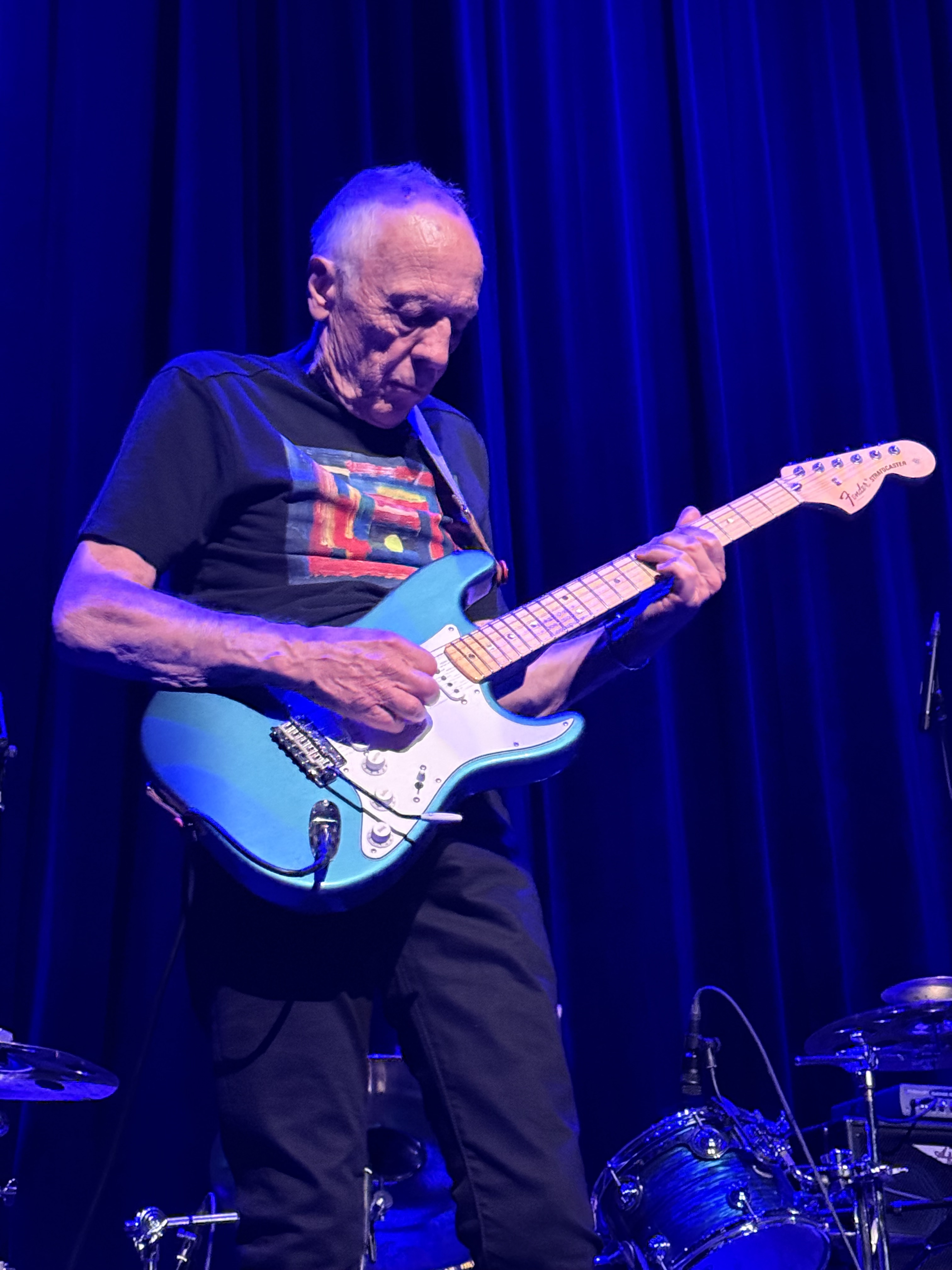
Robin Trower performing in 2025.

In 2019, it was announced that Trower had signed to Mascot Label Group, alongside the announcement of a new studio album Closer to the Day. Regarding the album's title, he told Guitar World, "I'm not thinking about dying — far from it. What I'm saying is, 'If I'm nearer the end than the beginning, then I've got to get going.'" The album was released on 22 March 2019, while its supporting tour was canceled due to the COVID-19 pandemic.

In February 2022, Trower announced his studio album No More Worlds to Conquer, alongside its title track. The record was released on 29 April 2022.

Sari Schorr is the featured vocalist on Trower's album, Joyful Sky, which was released on Provogue Records in October 2023.

On 6 June 2024, Trower announced the cancellation of his upcoming tour of the US scheduled for September/October, due to undisclosed health issues which would necessitate a major operation.

In October 2024, he said on his website: "Following a successful operation I am delighted to be back playing shows in 2025, starting with the sold out Rock Legends Cruise from Miami in February, and UK dates in May!". In 2025, he announced further US and UK dates for later in the year.

== Equipment ==
During a 1971 tour with Jethro Tull, Robin Trower arrived early for a sound check and found Martin Barre's Fender Stratocaster (which Barre used for slide playing) propped up against an amplifier. Trower picked up the guitar, plugged it in, and with a shout that resounded around the auditorium he yelled, "This is it!" "I then switched to Strat" he says. "Up to then I had been playing Les Pauls."

Since then Trower has been an ongoing proponent of the Fender Stratocaster. He currently uses his custom-built Strat (made by the Fender Custom Shop) which comes in black, white, and burgundy. The guitar is equipped with a 1950s reissue pick-up in the neck position, a 1960s reissue in the middle position, and a Texas Special at the bridge. Other features included a custom C-shaped maple neck featuring a large headstock with a Bullet truss-rod system, locking machine heads and a maple fingerboard with narrow-spaced abalone dot position inlays and 21 jumbo frets. The Strats he plays live are an exact model of his signature guitar, which is entirely unmodified. For his first two albums, his guitar was tuned in Standard Tuning EADGBE. Starting from the third album, he detuned the strings a semitone to an Eb Tuning (Eb Ab Db Gb Bb Eb). It is reported that during live performances, his guitar is tuned a full step down to a DGCFAD tuning. This long-established practice of detuning may have been prompted by his preference for very heavy-gauge guitar strings. Trower's three top strings (high E, B and G) measure .012", .015" and .017". By comparison, the most common choice of rock-and-roll lead players is .009", .011", .015". The width and weight of Trower's string set are similar to common acoustic guitar strings, and that weight makes vibrating and bending the strings more difficult, especially with the full tension of a standard tuning. Detuning them a half-step or more lower eases the tension and provides greater control. Trower told Guitar Player magazine in a July 1980 interview that he recommends every young player try a thicker set of strings. "The thicker sound alone is worth it, but they also help keep you from forming bad habits."

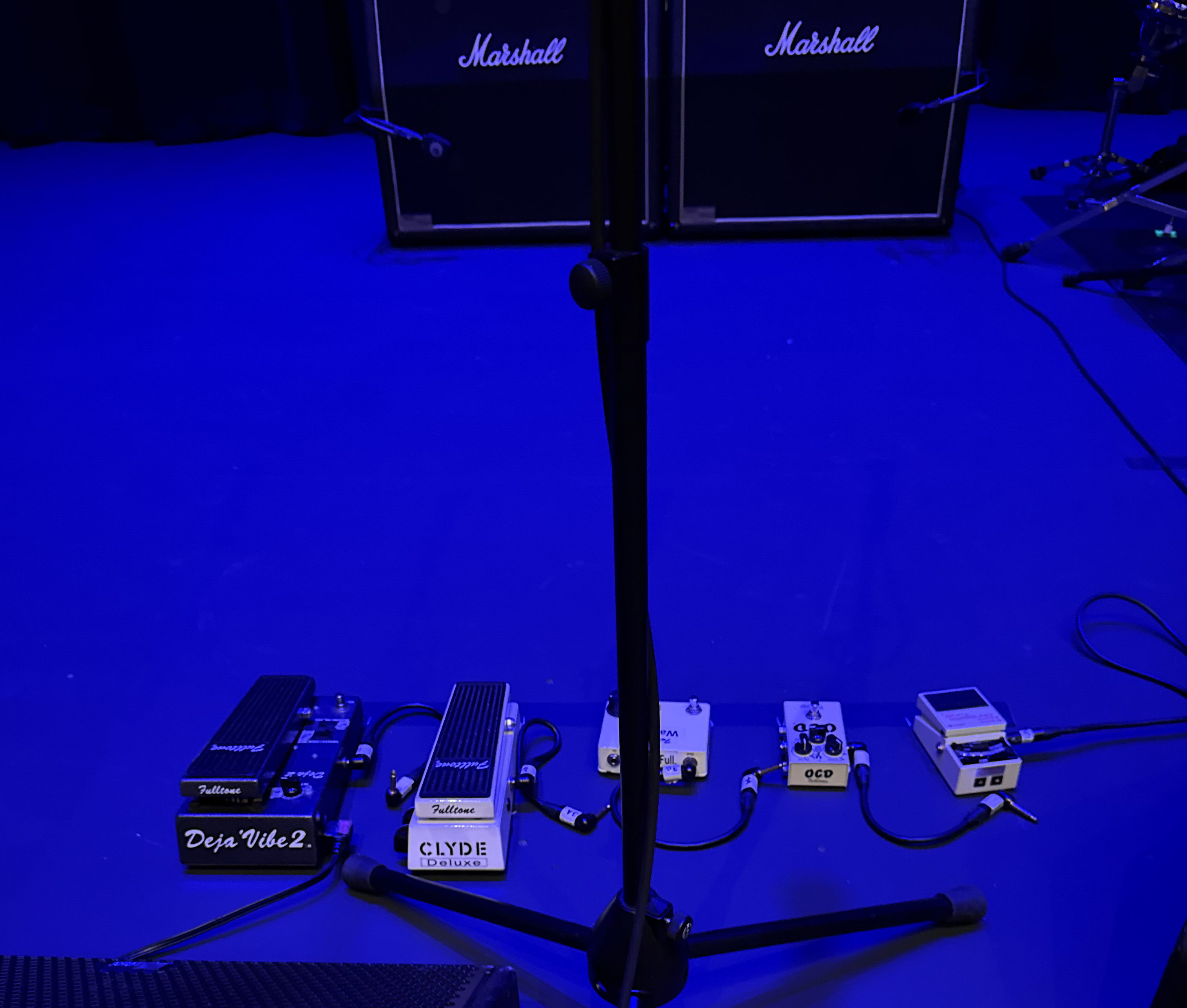
Trower's pedal setup, 2025

Trower uses between one and three 100-watt Marshall heads with four to six cabinets on stage. While he usually uses two JCM 800s and a JCM 900, he also links 100-watt Marshall Plexi heads. In studio sessions, Trower uses a mix of amplifiers, such as a Fender Blues Junior and Cornell Plexi Amplifiers models to acquire different tonality.

He has recently been using Fulltone pedals and effects. He favors the OCD, Distortion Pro, Fat Boost, CLYDE Deluxe Wah, Deja Vibe 2, Soul-Bender, and a BOSS Chromatic Tuner. He runs his Deja Vibe into his distortion pedal to get his famous tone. He was given his own signature Fulltone Robin Trower Overdrive in late 2008.

For his 2009 and 2011 US tours, Trower was using his Fender Custom Shop Signature Stratocaster into a Fulltone Deja Vibe 2, Fulltone Wahfull, Fulltone Clyde Standard Wah, Fulltone Full Drive, Fulltone Robin Trower Overdrive, and Boss TU-2 Chromatic Tuner into two Marshall Vintage Modern 2466 heads.

On his 2018 and 2025 tours, he used the same gear but through two 50 watt Marshall Plexi Reissue Heads, the 1987X.

== Personal life ==
Trower identifies as a Christian. When asked about his religious beliefs in a 2019 interview, Trower responded: "To be honest, I think I was chosen to have faith. At a very early age. We had Scripture at school, and it just rang a bell with me. That’s the only way I can explain it. Hearing the Gospels rang something inside of me. [My faith] helps to keep me on track, and not start wandering down useless paths." While admitting that he had "fallen away a bit from going to Mass lately," Trower nevertheless reaffirmed his identification as a Catholic.

Describing his self-care routine in a 2022 interview, Trower stated that "[during] the last 20 years or so, it’s been no alcohol, no tobacco, no drugs, a sensible diet, a little bit of exercise and a lot of prayer."

Trower married his wife Andrea in 1968, remaining married until her death in 2014.

Trower is an avid reader, and has cited Patrick O'Brian's nautical-themed Aubrey–Maturin series as a personal favorite, asserting that "It’s very rich in language. I love the idea of the sea, and I’ve got a breviary that explains all of the terminology, so I can go to that." Trower also enjoys reading about the Second World War and considers Winston Churchill a personal hero.

== Discography ==
=== With Procol Harum ===
- 1967 Procol Harum
- 1968 Shine On Brightly (Trower sings backup on "Wish Me Well")
- 1969 A Salty Dog (Trower sings lead on "Crucifiction Lane")
- 1970 Home
- 1970 Ain't Nothin' to Get Excited About (a vintage rock'n'roll side-project by members of Procol Harum, recording as 'Liquorice John Death')
- 1971 Broken Barricades (Trower sings lead on "Song for a Dreamer" and "Poor Mohammed")
- 1991 The Prodigal Stranger
- 1995 The Long Goodbye

=== With Robin Trower Band ===
==== Studio albums ====
Year	Album	UK	AUS	CAN	US	Certification	Label
1973	Twice Removed from Yesterday	—	—	—	106		Chrysalis
1974	Bridge of Sighs	—	41	3	7	US: Gold	Chrysalis
1975	For Earth Below	26	47	9	5	US: Gold	Chrysalis
1976	Long Misty Days	31	63	75	24	US: Gold	Chrysalis
1977	In City Dreams	58	—	27	25	US: Gold	Chrysalis
1978	Caravan to Midnight	—	87	57	37		Chrysalis
1980	Victims of the Fury	61	95	86	34		Chrysalis
1983	Back It Up	—	—	—	191		Chrysalis
1985	Beyond the Mist	—	—	—	—		Passport/Music for Nations
1987	Passion	—	—	—	100		GNP Crescendo
1988	Take What You Need	—	—	—	133		Atlantic
1990	In the Line of Fire	—	—	—	—		Atlantic
1994	20th Century Blues	—	—	—	—		V-12 (Trower's label)
1997	Someday Blues	—	—	—	—		V-12
2000	Go My Way	—	—	—	—		Aezra/Orpheus
2003	Living Out of Time	—	—	—	—		V-12
2005	Another Days Blues	—	—	—	—		V-12
2009	What Lies Beneath	—	—	—	—		V-12
2010	The Playful Heart	—	—	—	—		V-12
2013	Roots and Branches	—	—	—	—		V-12
2014	Something's About to Change	—	—	—	—		V-12
2016	Where You Are Going To	—	—	—	—		V-12
2017	Time and Emotion	—	—	—	—		V-12
2019	Coming Closer to the Day	—	—	—	—		Provogue
2021	United State of Mind [with Maxi Priest, Livingstone Brown]	—	—	—	—		Manhaton (UK)
2022	No More Worlds to Conquer	—	—	—	—		Provogue
2023	Joyful Sky [with Sari Schorr]	—	—	—	—		Provogue
2025	Come and Find Me	—	—	—	—		Provogue
2026	Shine	—	—	—	—		Provogue

==== Live albums ====
- 1976: Robin Trower Live! (recorded 2/03/75, Stockholm) – UK No. 15, US No. 10, AUS No. 73, SWE No. 40, CAN No. 52
- 1985: Beyond the Mist (recorded April 1985 at the Marquee Club, London)
- 1992: BBC Radio 1 Live in Concert (recorded 1/29/75)
- 1996: King Biscuit Flower Hour Presents: Robin Trower in Concert (recorded 10/18/77, New Haven, CT)
- 1999: This Was Now '74–'98 (recorded 1974, Pittsburgh, PA; 1998, Seattle, WA) -2-CD set
- 2006: Living Out of Time: Live (recorded 9/03/05, Bonn, Germany) [note: also available on DVD]
- 2009: RT@RO.08 (recorded 3/29/08, Royal Oak, MI)
- 2011: Robin Trower at the BBC 1973–1975 (recorded 3/26/73 [John Peel Session], 9/26/73 [Bob Harris Session], 2/20/74 [Bob Harris Session], 3/05/74 [John Peel Session], 1/28/75 [John Peel Session], and 1/29/75 [BBC Radio 1 Live in Concert, omitting 2 songs but adding 2 others]) -2-CD set
- 2013: State to State: Live Across America 1974–1980 (recorded 1974, Philadelphia; 1974, California; 1976, Illinois; 1977, Oklahoma; 1980, Missouri) -2-CD set
- 2015: Rock Goes to College 1980 (recorded 2/25/80, London)
- 2026: One Moment in Time: Live in the USA
- 2026: Robin Trower Live! 50th Anniversary Edition (Expanded re-issue of 1976 Robin Trower Live!)

==== Compilations ====
- 1987: The Robin Trower Portfolio
- 1991: Essential Robin Trower
- 1991: Robin Trower: The Collection
- 1994: Robin Trower Anthology
- 2002: Speed Of Sound: The Best of Robin Trower
- 2004: Dreaming the Blues -2-CD set
- 2008: Day of the Eagle: The Best of Robin Trower
- 2010: A Tale Untold: The Chrysalis Years 1973–1976 -3-CD set
- 2012: Farther on Up the Road: The Chrysalis Years 1977–1983 -3-CD set
- 2014: Compendium 1987–2013 -2-CD set
- 2014: Original Album Series (contains Twice Removed from Yesterday, Bridge of Sighs, For Earth Below, Robin Trower Live!, Long Misty Days) -5-CD set
- 2015: Original Album Series, Vol. 2 (contains In City Dreams, Caravan to Midnight, Victims of the Fury, B.L.T., Truce) -5-CD set
- 2019: The Studio Albums 1973–1983 (contains all 10 Chrysalis studio albums presented in card-sleeves housed in a clamshell box) -10-CD set

=== With Jack Bruce ===
- 1981: B.L.T. – US No. 37
- 1982: Truce – US No. 109
- 1989: No Stopping Anytime (compilation of B.L.T. and Truce)
- 2007: Seven Moons
- 2009: Seven Moons Live (recorded 2/28/09, Nijmegen, Holland) [note: also available on DVD] re-released as Songs from the Road
- 2014: Silver Rails (“Rusty Lady”)

=== With Bryan Ferry ===
- 1993: Taxi
- 1994: Mamouna
- 2002: Frantic
- 2007: Dylanesque
