= Chris Thomas (music producer) =

English record producer (born 1947)

- Born: Christopher P. Thomas; 13 January 1947 (age 79); Perivale, Middlesex, England
- Genres: Rock; pop
- Occupations: Record producer; musician
- Instruments: Keyboards; bass guitar; guitar
- Years active: 1967–present

Christopher P. Thomas (born 13 January 1947) is an English record producer who has worked extensively with the Beatles, Pink Floyd, Procol Harum, Roxy Music, Badfinger, Elton John, Paul McCartney, Pete Townshend, Pulp and the Pretenders. He has also produced breakthrough albums for the Sex Pistols, the Climax Blues Band, the Pretenders and INXS.

== Early life ==
Thomas was classically trained on the violin and piano as a child and he began playing bass in London pop bands, turning down at one point the opportunity to play with Jimi Hendrix and Mitch Mitchell before Hendrix had struck fame. After several years, Thomas decided that he had little interest in making a career as a performing musician. In a 1998 interview, he stated "I realized that being in a band you were dependent on all these other people, and I also knew that if I'd ever been successful in a band, I would've wanted to stay in the studio and just make the records; I wasn't that interested in playing live."

== Recording sessions with the Beatles ==
Looking to break into production, Thomas wrote to Beatles producer George Martin seeking work and, in 1967, was employed as an assistant by AIR, an independent production company, which had been founded by Martin and three other EMI producers. Thomas was allowed to attend sessions at EMI Studios by the Hollies and, in 1968, the Beatles. He was there for much of the recording of the Beatles' self-titled double album (also known as the "White Album"). Midway through these sessions, Martin decided to take a holiday, and he proposed that Thomas continue working with the band in his absence. Thomas recalled: "I had just come back from holiday myself, and when I came in there was a little letter on the desk that said, "Dear Chris, Hope you had a nice holiday. I'm off on mine now. Make yourself available to The Beatles. Neil and Mal know you're coming down."

Thomas produced (without credit) "Birthday" and "Happiness Is a Warm Gun". He also played keyboards on four songs from The White Album: harpsichord on "Piggies", mellotron on "The Continuing Story of Bungalow Bill", piano on "Long, Long, Long" and electric piano on "Savoy Truffle".

== Early production credits ==
Thomas was not credited as producer or co-producer on The Beatles, although his name appears as co-producer on some of the original session sheets. By the end of 1968, he had received his first solo credit: The Climax Chicago Blues Band by the Climax Blues Band.

Procol Harum would be the first band with which Thomas would enjoy a steady working relationship, producing their albums Home, Broken Barricades and Procol Harum Live: In Concert with the Edmonton Symphony Orchestra during 1970–71. Thomas subsequently travelled to Los Angeles to produce Christopher Milk's 1972 album Some People Will Drink Anything (Warner Bros/Reprise), and met John Cale, who invited Thomas to produce his album Paris 1919 (1973). At the sessions with Procol, Thomas met Roxy Music singer-songwriter Bryan Ferry, who asked him to produce the band's second album, For Your Pleasure (1973). The collaboration continued for the next four albums (Stranded, Country Life, Siren and Viva!).

== Recording sessions with Pink Floyd ==
In 1973, as Thomas' work continued to attract interest, he took on mixing duties with Pink Floyd for their The Dark Side of the Moon album. "I came in at the end," he said. "I'd heard the band sent the tapes off to four different people to mix, so they could choose their favourite mix. I thought this was a weird idea, especially as they had worked on it for such a long time and had been producing it themselves. I understood they wanted someone to give opinions on whether something worked or not. But to take the tapes away and mix it? I said, 'I definitely don't want to do that.' So, in the end, they finally came in and we mixed it altogether at Abbey Road."

In his Mix interview, Thomas claimed he would finish work on the Floyd album at midnight and drive to AIR Studios to do more work on Procol Harum's Grand Hotel album until 5 am. Thomas got involved after David Gilmour, Rick Wright, Roger Waters and Nick Mason could not agree how the album should be mixed: Waters and Mason wanted a dry and clean mix, using the nonmusical elements, while Gilmour and Wright wanted a more subtle mix, with an emphasis on echo. Wright denied that there were any violent arguments.

In 1993, Gilmour described Thomas' role on as a referee for arguments between himself and Waters: "[We] argued so much that it was suggested we get a third opinion. We were going to leave Chris to mix it on his own, with Alan Parsons engineering. And, of course, on the first day I found out that Roger sneaked in there. So the second day I sneaked in there. And from then on, we both sat right at Chris's shoulder, interfering. But luckily, Chris was more sympathetic to my point of view than he was to Roger's."

Gilmour's recollections are disputed by Thomas: "There was no difference in opinion between them. I don't remember Roger once saying that he wanted less echo. In fact, there were never any hints that they were later going to fall out. It was a very creative atmosphere. A lot of fun."

"The overall sound was pretty much dictated by what was on the multitracks," observed engineer Alan Parsons. "I don't think the mix necessarily revolutionised what was there. If you were to play the multitrack tape now and put the faders up, it would sound like the Dark Side of the Moon we all know. So, no, I wasn't aware of any conflict of that kind. But the plus side of Chris being brought in was in solving any problems between the band at the time of mixing. He was like a mentor, a guiding light and intermediary."

In any event, Thomas's involvement resulted in both Waters and Gilmour being satisfied with the final release. He also synchronised the echo on "Us and Them" and was at the session for "The Great Gig in the Sky".

== Recording sessions with Badfinger ==
Thomas produced a trio of albums for power pop group Badfinger on the tail end of their career, beginning with 1973's Ass, and 1974's Badfinger and Wish You Were Here albums. Ass was originally recorded with Badfinger producing, but the group later admitted they were incapable of producing themselves. Members Pete Ham and Tom Evans solicited Thomas' help in cleaning up existing recordings and laying down new tracks. Although the succeeding album Badfinger retained Thomas from the outset and was considered by critics to be an improvement in production, neither album was successful in the marketplace.

For their third project together, Thomas held a meeting with the group and pleaded that they all concentrate on making the best record they could muster. It turned out that Wish You Were Here garnered the most positive critical response from periodicals, including Rolling Stone magazine.

== Recording sessions with the Sadistic Mika Band ==
After hearing their 1973 self-titled debut album, Thomas requested to produce the Sadistic Mika Band, a Japanese rock band led by husband and wife duo Kazuhiko Katō and Mika Fukui. He produced their second album Kurofune (aka Black Ship), which was released on 5 November 1974. During its recording, Mika and Thomas began an extramarital affair around June 1974. The affair ultimately caused the Sadistic Mika Band to break up in November 1975, when Mika decided to stay in the UK with Thomas and refused to return to Japan with the rest of the band. Their Thomas-produced third studio album, Hot! Menu, was released on 5 November 1975. After she divorced Katō, Mika and Thomas eventually married. By 1983, Mika had left Thomas.

== Recording sessions with the Sex Pistols ==
In 1976, he was asked by Malcolm McLaren to produce the Sex Pistols. Thomas' colleagues in the recording industry were horrified by his involvement with the Sex Pistols, particularly when he found himself producing the band at the same time as he was working with Paul McCartney. His work with the band also led to one of his most curious album credits. Co-producer Bill Price explained:

The simple facts of the matter were that Chris was hired by Malcolm (McLaren) to do a series of singles for the Sex Pistols. I was hired by Malcolm to do a series of album tracks with the Sex Pistols. Life got slightly complicated, because I did a few album tracks that Chris remade as singles. Also, Chris started a couple of tracks, which got abandoned as singles, which I remade to be used as album tracks. On quite a large number of songs, when we'd finished the album, we had two versions of the song. I couldn't quite understand why Malcolm kept chopping and changing between different versions of different songs. It slowly dawned on Chris and myself that Malcolm was trying to slip between two stools and not pay Chris or me. So we said, "I'll tell you what, Malcolm. Whatever's on the Sex Pistols' album, it was either done by me or Chris, and you can pay us and we'll divvy it out amongst our little selves." Which is what we did. But it did force that very strange credit, simply because the sleeve was printed long before it was finally decided which version of each individual song was on the record. If we'd known, it would have said 'produced by Bill Price' or 'produced by Chris Thomas'. That's how you ended up with that credit, 'produced by Bill Price or Chris Thomas'.

During the media furore over the single God Save the Queen, Thomas, Price and Sex Pistols' vocalist Johnny Rotten were subject to a razor attack outside a pub in Highbury, London.

In 2007, Thomas produced a brand new studio recording of "Pretty Vacant" for use in the new video game Skate. John Lydon, Steve Jones and Paul Cook all play on this new version, which was recorded in Los Angeles in July 2007. Neither of the original bass players, Glen Matlock or Sid Vicious were present (Vicious had died in 1979).

== Work with other artists ==
Thomas also programmed Moog synthesizer on David Bowie's first two albums, the song "Son of My Father" by Chicory Tip, Leonard Cohen's Songs of Love and Hate, and Elton John's eponymous album. He also programmed and played Moog synthesiser on George Harrison's All Things Must Pass and the theme from The Persuaders! by John Barry. In 1979, Thomas produced Wings' final album Back to the Egg, as bandleader Paul McCartney was looking for a more (and then current) new wave or punk oriented production style.

Thomas was a fundamental part of the Pretenders' success, producing The Pretenders' first (self-titled) album in 1980, the second album Pretenders II in 1981 and their third effort, Learning to Crawl (1984), and all singles in between; his work on Learning to Crawl earned him the nickname on the liner notes of the "fifth Pretender". He returned on their 1994 success, Last of the Independents, co-producing one track "I'm A Mother" with Ian Stanley.

In 1985, Thomas played a critical part in achieving a worldwide breakthrough for the Australian band INXS. The band's keyboardist and main songwriter Andrew Farriss stated that the band had "already finished the Listen Like Thieves album, but Chris Thomas told us there was still no 'hit'. We left the studio that night knowing we had one day left and we had to deliver 'a hit'. Talk about pressure." Thomas recalls he was worried that the standard of songs the band had laid down was not as strong as he wished. Thomas then went on to produce the follow-up album, 1987's Kick, which became INXS' most successful album of their career. He also produced 1990's X.

Thomas has won Rolling Stone Critics "Producer of the Year", Billboard "Producer of the Year", plus two Grammys and a Brit Award.

== Production credits ==
Singles produced by Thomas include:

- "Street Life", "Love Is the Drug" by Roxy Music
- "Let's Stick Together" by Bryan Ferry
- "Be Good to Yourself" by Frankie Miller
- "Anarchy in the U.K.", "God Save the Queen", "Pretty Vacant", "Holidays in the Sun" by The Sex Pistols
- "Brass in Pocket", "Talk of the Town", "I Go to Sleep", "Back on the Chain Gang" by The Pretenders
- "Let My Love Open the Door", "Face the Face" by Pete Townshend
- "Blue Eyes", "I'm Still Standing", "I Guess That's Why They Call It the Blues", "Sacrifice", "Can You Feel the Love Tonight", "Circle of Life" by Elton John
- "What You Need", "Need You Tonight", "Never Tear Us Apart", "Suicide Blonde", "Disappear" by INXS
- "Stay" by Shakespears Sister
- "All for Love" by Bryan Adams, Rod Stewart and Sting
- "Common People" by Pulp

Albums produced or mixed by Thomas include:

- 1968: The Climax Chicago Blues Band by Climax Blues Band, The Beatles by the Beatles
- 1969: Climax Blues Band Plays On by Climax Blues Band, Abbey Road by the Beatles
- 1970: A Lot of Bottle by Climax Blues Band, Home by Procol Harum
- 1971: Tightly Knit by Climax Blues Band, Mick Abrahams by Mick Abrahams
- 1972: Some People Will Drink Anything by Christopher Milk, At Last by Mick Abrahams Band, keyboard player on Son of My Father by Chicory Tip
- 1973: For Your Pleasure by Roxy Music, Stranded by Roxy Music, Grand Hotel by Procol Harum, Paris 1919 by John Cale, Ass by Badfinger, The Dark Side of the Moon (mixing) by Pink Floyd
- 1974: Badfinger by Badfinger, Wish You Were Here by Badfinger, Exotic Birds and Fruit by Procol Harum, Kurofune (aka Black Ship) by Sadistic Mika Band, Country Life by Roxy Music
- 1975: Siren by Roxy Music, Hot Menu! by Sadistic Mika Band
- 1976: Viva! by Roxy Music, Let's Stick Together by Bryan Ferry, Full House by Frankie Miller
- 1977: Never Mind the Bollocks by the Sex Pistols, Hurt by Chris Spedding
- 1978: Power in the Darkness by Tom Robinson Band
- 1979: Back to the Egg by Wings
- 1980: Pretenders by The Pretenders; Empty Glass by Pete Townshend
- 1981: Pretenders II by The Pretenders, The Fox by Elton John
- 1982: All the Best Cowboys Have Chinese Eyes by Pete Townshend, Jump Up! by Elton John
- 1983: Too Low for Zero by Elton John
- 1984: Hysteria by The Human League
- 1984: Learning to Crawl by The Pretenders; Breaking Hearts by Elton John
- 1985: Listen Like Thieves by INXS; White City by Pete Townshend
- 1987: Kick by INXS
- 1988: Reg Strikes Back by Elton John; Live Nude Guitars by Brian Setzer
- 1989: Sleeping with the Past by Elton John
- 1990: X by INXS
- 1992: The One by Elton John
- 1994: Last of the Independents by The Pretenders, The Lion King soundtrack, Jewel by Marcella Detroit, The Division Bell by Pink Floyd (mixing)
- 1995: Different Class by Pulp
- 1996: Filthy Lucre Live by Sex Pistols
- 1997: The Big Picture by Elton John
- 1998: This Is Hardcore by Pulp
- 1999: Run Devil Run by Paul McCartney
- 2001: Or8? by Hoggboy
- 2004: How to Dismantle an Atomic Bomb by U2
- 2006: On an Island by David Gilmour; Razorlight by Razorlight
- 2010: Serotonin by Mystery Jets
- 2013: Snapshot by The Strypes
