= Long Misty Days =

Studio album by Robin Trower
- Released: October 1976
- Recorded: 1976
- Studio: AIR, London
- Genre: Blues; rock
- Length: 35:16
- Label: Chrysalis/Capitol
- Producer: Geoff Emerick, Robin Trower

Robin Trower chronology
Robin Trower Live (1975)	''Long Misty Days'' (1976)	In City Dreams (1977)

Professional ratings
Review scores
Source	Rating
AllMusic	3/5 stars

Long Misty Days is guitarist and songwriter Robin Trower's fourth solo album, released in 1976. The cover art is by "Funky" Paul Olsen. The single "Caledonia" reached number 81 in Canada.

== Track listing ==
All tracks composed by Robin Trower and James Dewar, except where indicated

Side one
No.	Title	Length
1.	"Same Rain Falls"	3:12
2.	"Long Misty Days"	5:41
3.	"Hold Me"	3:34
4.	"Caledonia"	3:38
Total length:		16:05

Side two
No.	Title	Writer(s)	Length
1.	"Pride"		3:08
2.	"Sailing"	Gavin Sutherland	3:43
3.	"S.M.O."	James Dewar, Bill Lordan, Robin Trower	3:41
4.	"I Can't Live Without You"	James Dewar, Frankie Miller, Robin Trower	4:22
5.	"Messin' The Blues"	James Dewar, Bill Lordan, Robin Trower	3:54
Total length:			18:46

== Personnel ==
- Robin Trower – guitar
- James Dewar – bass, vocals
- Bill Lordan – drums

== Charts ==
Chart (1976/77)	Peak position
Australia (Kent Music Report)	63
United Kingdom (Official Charts Company)	31
United States (Billboard 200)	24

== Cover versions ==
The title track was covered by guitarist Michael Schenker and former Gamma and Robin Trower singer Davey Pattison in 2004 for their first "Schenker Pattison Summit" album, The Endless Jam.
