= Gary Brooker =

English singer and pianist (1945–2022)

Gary Brooker MBE
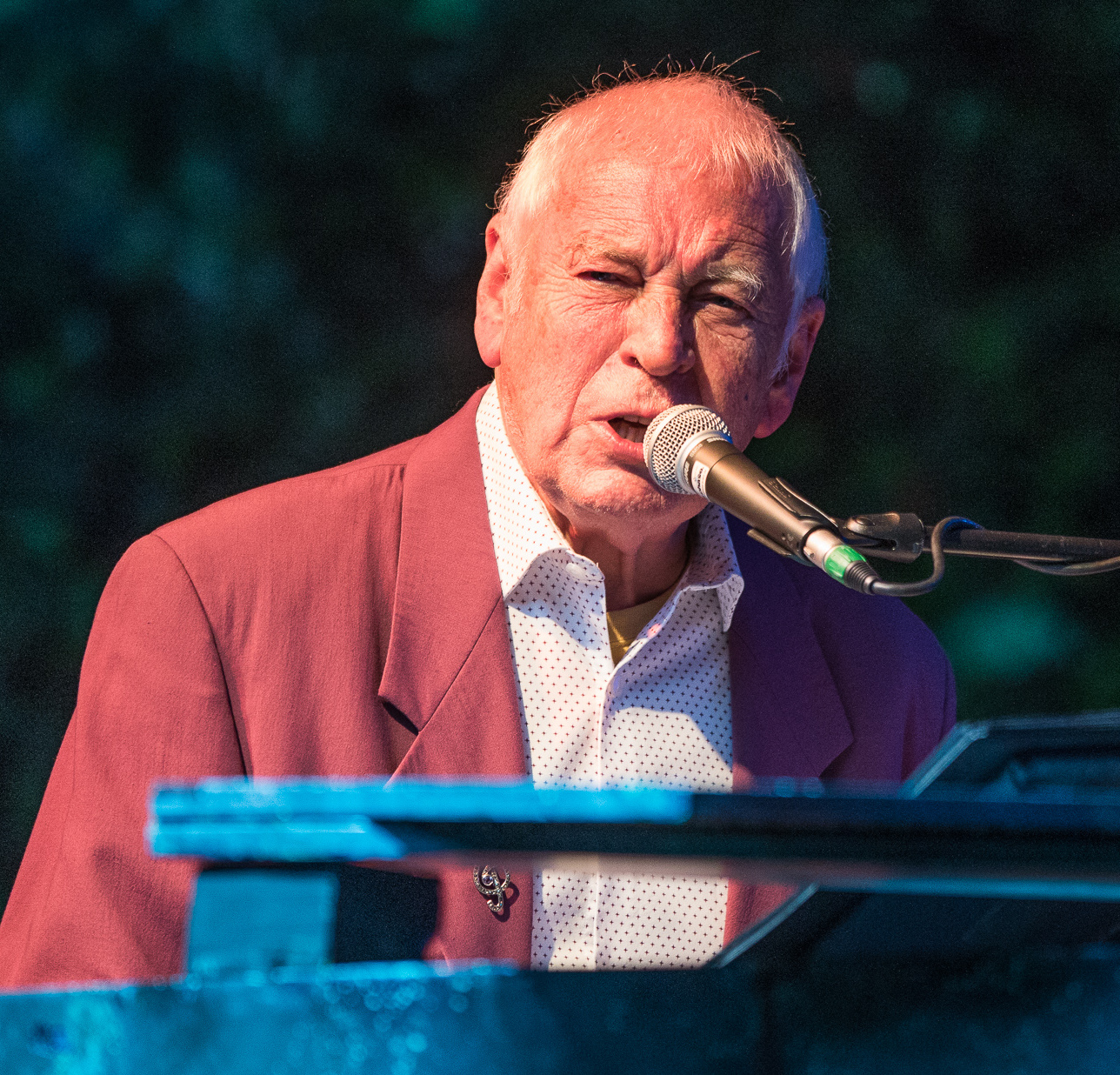
- Brooker in 2018

Background information
- Born: 29 May 1945; London, England
- Died: 19 February 2022 (aged 76) Guildford, Surrey, England
- Genres: Progressive rock; hard rock; baroque pop; rock and roll; jazz
- Occupations: Musician; singer; songwriter
- Instruments: Vocals; keyboards
- Years active: 1962–2022
- Labels: Mercury; Chrysalis
- Formerly of: Procol Harum; The Paramounts; Ringo Starr & His All-Starr Band; Bill Wyman's Rhythm Kings; No Stiletto Shoes

Gary Brooker MBE (29 May 1945 – 19 February 2022) was an English singer and pianist, and the founder and lead singer of the rock band Procol Harum.

== Early life ==
Born in Hackney Hospital, East London, on 29 May 1945, Brooker grew up in Hackney before the family moved out to Middlesex (Bush Hill Park and then to nearby Edmonton). His father Harry Brooker was a professional musician, playing steel guitar with Felix Mendelssohn's Hawaiian Serenaders, and as a child Brooker learned to play piano, cornet, and trombone. In 1954 the family moved to the seaside resort of Southend-on-Sea, Essex, where Brooker attended Westcliff High School for Boys. His father died of a heart attack when Gary was 11 years old, forcing his mother to work in order to make ends meet, while Brooker himself took on a paper-round. When he left school, he went on to Southend Municipal College to study zoology and botany but dropped out to become a professional musician.

== Career ==
Brooker founded the Paramounts in 1962 with his guitarist friend, Robin Trower. The band gained respect within the burgeoning 1960s British R&B scene, which yielded the Beatles, the Animals, the Spencer Davis Group, the Rolling Stones, and many others. The Rolling Stones, in particular, were Paramounts fans, sharing the stage with them several times in the early 1960s.

In 1966, Brooker founded Procol Harum with his friend Keith Reid. "A Whiter Shade of Pale" is the worldwide hit for which Procol Harum is best known, but Brooker's melancholic vocals and emotive, eclectic piano playing were a key part of the band's musical mix. In the early years Brooker, Hammond organist Matthew Fisher, and Trower were the guiding musical forces behind the band, but after disparities in style became too much and Fisher and Trower left, Brooker was the clear leader. Brooker started a solo career and released the album No More Fear of Flying in 1979.

The same year, Brooker joined friend and neighbour Eric Clapton's band. With Brooker in the lineup, they released the studio album Another Ticket. Clapton fired the entire band in 1981, but he and Brooker remained good friends afterwards, and were for many years neighbours in the Surrey Hills. Brooker joined Clapton for several one-off benefit gigs over the years. Brooker sang lead vocal on the Alan Parsons Project song "Limelight", on their 1985 album, Stereotomy. Brooker sang the lead vocal of the song "No News from the Western Frontier", a single taken from the album Hi-Tec Heroes by the Dutch performer Ad Visser.

A new incarnation of Procol Harum, led by Brooker, continued touring the world, celebrating its 40th anniversary in July 2007 with two days of musical revels at St John's, Smith Square, in London. Brooker also toured with Ringo Starr's All-Starr Band in 1997 and 1999, and he was also a member of Bill Wyman's Rhythm Kings for several years, appearing on three of their albums and touring with the band. On 28 September 1996, as the Gary Brooker Ensemble, he organised a charity concert to raise funds for his local church, St Mary and All Saints, in Surrey. The resulting live CD of the concert, Within Our House, originally released on a fan club CD in a limited run of 1000 units, later became a collectable recording. His guests and supporting artists included Dave Bronze, Michael Bywater, Mark Brzezicki, and Robbie McIntosh.

Also in 1996, Brooker appeared in the Alan Parker film adaptation of Andrew Lloyd Webber's Evita starring Madonna, Jonathan Pryce, and Antonio Banderas. Playing the part of Juan Atilio Bramuglia, he sang the song "Rainbow Tour" with Peter Polycarpou and Antonio Banderas. Brooker said that his greatest single earning in his career was from his appearance in the film.

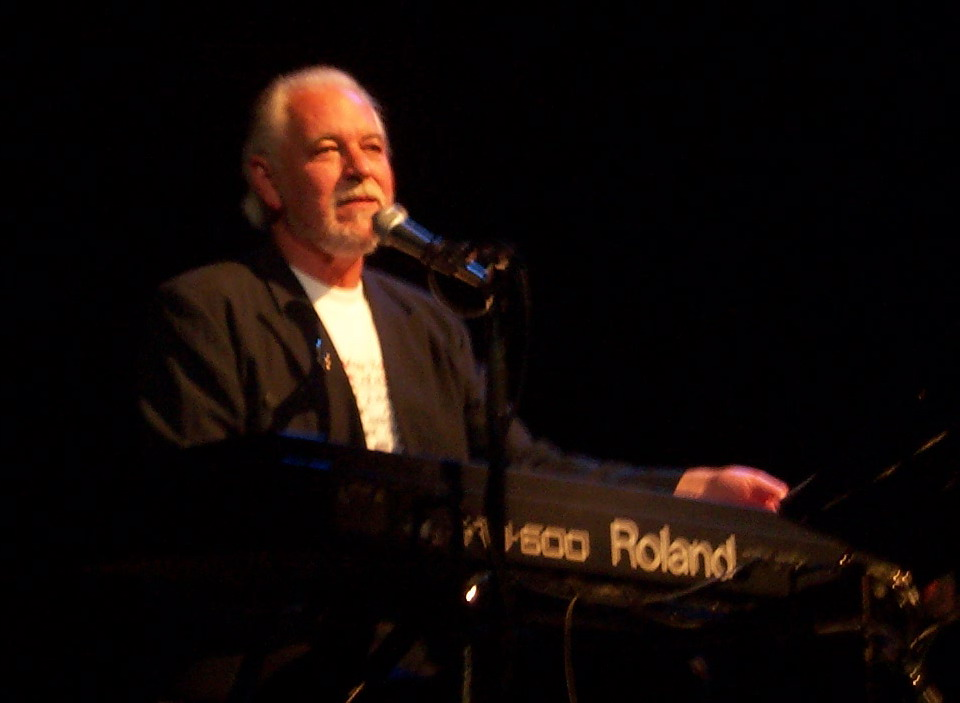
Brooker with Procol Harum in 2002

Brooker contributed to George Harrison's albums All Things Must Pass (1970), Somewhere in England (1981) and Gone Troppo (1982). On 29 November 2002 he was among musicians and singers participating in the Harrison tribute concert, Concert for George, at which he sang lead vocals on their version of "Old Brown Shoe". In April 2005, as part of the Gary Brooker Ensemble, he played a sold out charity concert at Guildford Cathedral in aid of the tsunami appeal, playing a mixture of Procol Harum and solo songs and arrangements of classical and spiritual songs. His guests and supporting artists included Andy Fairweather Low and Paul Jones (ex-Manfred Mann).

On 28 October 2009, Brooker was presented with a BASCA in recognition of his unique contribution to music. In 2011 he organised and performed in a concert at his home Wintershall, in Bramley, Surrey, in aid of the charity HASTE (Heart and Stroke Trust Endeavour). His guest musicians included Eric Clapton, Jeff Beck, Andy Fairweather Low, Georgie Fame, and Lulu.

In May 2012, Procol Harum were forced to cancel the remainder of their dates in South Africa after Brooker fractured his skull following a fall in his hotel room in Cape Town. The fall came on Brooker's 67th birthday. The band was part of the British Invasion Tour of South Africa along with the Moody Blues and 10cc. Brooker again fell injuring himself, during the interval of a Procol Harum concert at London's Royal Festival Hall in March 2017. Returning to the stage after a longer than expected interval, Brooker's head was bandaged and it was later discovered that he had broken a finger. However, they continued touring until 2019, playing their final gig in Switzerland.

== Personal life ==
In July 1968, Brooker married Françoise Riedo ("Franky"), a Swiss au pair, whom he met circa 1965. The couple had no children.

Brooker was a supporter of the Countryside Alliance and played in concerts to raise funds for the organisation. On 14 June 2003, he was appointed a Member of the Order of the British Empire (MBE) in the 2003 Queen's Birthday Honours, in recognition of his charitable services.

Brooker died from cancer at his home in Guildford, Surrey on 19 February 2022, at the age of 76.

A memorial concert was held at G Live in Guildford on 4 December 2023 with a number of top musician friends on stage (Paul Carrack, Mike Rutherford, Roger Taylor and Andy Fairweather Low amongst them) and others (Paul McCartney, Ringo Starr, Tom Jones, Nick Mason & Elton John) sending video tributes. Eric Clapton was unable to play but sent an opening message to the capacity crowd. The evening was professionally videoed in aid of The Royal Marsden Hospital and a Parkinson's charity. A DVD of the concert was released in August 2025.

== "A Whiter Shade of Pale" authorship lawsuit ==
In 2005, former Procol Harum organist Matthew Fisher filed suit in the High Court against Brooker and his publisher, claiming that he co-wrote the music for the song. Fisher won the case on 20 December 2006 but was awarded 40% of the composers' share of the music copyright, rather than the 50% he was seeking and was not granted royalties for the period before 2005.

== Solo discography ==
=== Studio albums ===
- 1979: No More Fear of Flying (AUS #94)
- 1982: Lead Me to the Water
- 1985: Echoes in the Night

=== Live albums ===
- 1996: Within Our House
- 2025: Live at Rockpalast 1983

=== Singles ===
- 1979: "Savannah"
- 1979: "Say It Ain't So Joe"
- 1979: "No More Fear of Flying" (NET #21)
- 1980: "Leave The Candle"
- 1982: "Cycle (Let It Flow)"
- 1982: "Low Flying Birds"
- 1982: "The Angler"
- 1984: "The Long Goodbye"
- 1985: "Two Fools in Love"
- 1987: "No News from the Western Frontier" (single in the Netherlands, taken from Ad Visser's album Hi-Tec Heroes)

=== Contributor ===
- 1970: All Things Must Pass (George Harrison) – piano
- 1971: Distant Light (The Hollies) – organ on track 11, "Long Dark Road"
- 1975: Peter and the Wolf (Jack Lancaster and Robin Lumley, producers) — synthesizer
- 1977: Full House – Frankie Miller
- 1978: Juppanese (Mickey Jupp – keyboards, organ, piano, producer (side 2)
- 1978: Five Three One – Double Seven O Four (The Hollies) – vocals on track 4, "Harlequin"
- 1981: Another Ticket (Eric Clapton) – track 8, "Catch Me If You Can"
- 1985: Stereotomy (Alan Parsons Project) – lead vocals on track 4, "Limelight"
- 1993: The Red Shoes (Kate Bush) – Hammond on track 2, "And So Is Love", track 9, "Constellation of the Heart" and track 12, "You're the One"
- 1999: Drivers Eyes (Ian McDonald) – track 11, "Let There Be Light"
- 2003: Concert for George (Memorial concert for George Harrison)
- 2005: Aerial (Kate Bush) – organ, vocals

== Sources ==
- Frame, Pete (1999). Rockin' Around Britain: Rock'n'roll Landmarks of the UK and Ireland. Omnibus. ISBN 978-0-7119-6973-5.
- Johansen, Claes (2000). Procol Harum: Beyond the Pale. SAF Publishing. ISBN 978-0-946719-28-0.
- Scott-Irvine, Henry (2012). The Ghosts of a Whiter Shade of Pale: Procol Harum. Omnibus. ISBN 978-1-78038-233-3.
- Steensma, Frans (2024). Gary Brooker and Procol Harum: Day By Day. Amsterdam: Procoholic Media. ISBN 9789090378756.
