= Secrets of the Hive =

Compilation album by Procol Harum
- Released: August 27, 2007
- Recorded: 1967–2003
- Genre: Progressive rock
- Label: Union Square Music
- Producer: Rob Keyloch

Procol Harum chronology
Live at Union Chapel (2004)	Secrets of the Hive (2007)	One Eye to the Future – Live in Italy 2007 (2008)

Professional ratings
Review scores
Source	Rating
AllMusic	4/5 stars

Secrets of the Hive, by Procol Harum, is a 2-CD best-of album that was released in 2007 to mark the 40th anniversary of their first single, "A Whiter Shade of Pale". The album contains tracks from previous albums (not including The Long Goodbye), singles and the previously unreleased Into the Flood.

== Track listing ==
=== Disc 1 ===
No.	Title	Writer(s)	Place of Origin	Length
1.	"A Whiter Shade of Pale"	Gary Brooker, Keith Reid, Matthew Fisher	Non-album UK single, 1967	4:08
2.	"A Christmas Camel"	Brooker, Reid	Procol Harum, 1967	4:49
3.	"Quite Rightly So"	Brooker, Fisher, Reid	Shine On Brightly, 1968	3:39
4.	"Long Gone Geek"	Brooker, Fisher, Reid	B-side to the "A Salty Dog" single, 1969	3:13
5.	"All This and More"	Brooker, Reid	A Salty Dog, 1969	3:50
6.	"Whisky Train"	Robin Trower, Reid	Home, 1970	4:31
7.	"Broken Barricades"	Brooker, Reid	Broken Barricades, 1971	3:10
8.	"Simple Sister"	Brooker, Reid	Broken Barricades	5:49
9.	"A Salty Dog (Live)"	Brooker, Reid	Procol Harum Live: In Concert with the Edmonton Symphony Orchestra, 1972; originally from A Salty Dog	5:36
10.	"Fires (Which Burnt Brightly)"	Brooker, Reid	Grand Hotel, 1973	5:10
11.	"Bringing Home the Bacon"	Brooker, Reid	Grand Hotel	4:20
12.	"Beyond the Pale"	Brooker, Reid	Exotic Birds and Fruit, 1974	3:03
13.	"Nothing But the Truth"	Brooker, Reid	Exotic Birds and Fruit	3:12
14.	"Something Magic"	Brooker, Reid	Something Magic, 1977	3:36
15.	"Holding On"	Brooker, Reid	The Prodigal Stranger, 1991	4:17
16.	"Into the Flood (Live)"	Brooker, Matt Noble, Reid	Procol Harum – In Concert with the Danish National Concert Orchestra and Choir, 2009; originally a B-side to "The Truth Won't Fade Away" single, 1991	5:43
17.	"An Old English Dream"	Brooker, Reid	The Well's on Fire, 2003	4:40
18.	"Repent Walpurgis"	Fisher	Procol Harum	5:02

=== Disc 2 ===
No.	Title	Writer(s)	Place of Origin	Length
1.	"Homburg"	Brooker, Reid	Non-album single, 1967	3:57
2.	"She Wandered Through the Garden Fence"	Brooker, Reid	Procol Harum	3:24
3.	"Magdalene (My Regal Zonophone)"	Brooker, Reid	Shine On Brightly	2:50
4.	"Shine On Brightly"	Brooker, Reid	Shine On Brightly	3:31
5.	"The Devil Came from Kansas"	Brooker, Reid	A Salty Dog	4:36
6.	"Whaling Stories"	Brooker, Reid	Home	7:07
7.	"Power Failure"	Brooker, Reid	Broken Barricades	4:30
8.	"Conquistador (Live)"	Brooker, Reid	Procol Harum Live: In Concert with the Edmonton Symphony Orchestra; originally from Procol Harum	4:34
9.	"Grand Hotel"	Brooker, Reid	Grand Hotel	6:10
10.	"A Souvenir of London"	Brooker, Reid	Grand Hotel	3:21
11.	"The Idol"	Brooker, Reid	Exotic Birds and Fruit	6:37
12.	"As Strong as Samson"	Brooker, Reid	Exotic Birds and Fruit	5:04
13.	"Pandora's Box"	Brooker, Reid	Procol's Ninth	3:34
14.	"(You Can't) Turn Back the Page"	Brooker, Noble, Reid	The Prodigal Stranger	3:58
15.	"A Dream in Ev'ry Home"	Brooker, Fisher, Reid	The Prodigal Stranger	4:02
16.	"This World Is Rich (For Stephen Maboe)"	Brooker, Reid	The Well's on Fire	5:17
17.	"Weisselklenzenacht (The Signature)"	Fisher	The Well's on Fire	5:21
