= Open All Hours (album) =

Studio album by The Hamsters
- Released: 2004
- Genre: Blues Rock
- Length: 62:52
- Label: Rockin' Rodent Recordings
- Producers: The Hamsters, Phil Hilborne and Jerry Stevenson

The Hamsters chronology
They Live By Night (2002)	Open All Hours (2004)

Open All Hours is the ninth and final studio album by the Hamsters. It was recorded during a hectic touring schedule June/July 2003, and released in 2004.

The band's notorious self-deprecating humour came to the fore with the artwork for this particular album. It featured several pictures of famous movie stars and classic British comedy stars with heads being replaced (and not always in a flattering manner) by members of the band. The whole booklet was designed to represent the walk from the box office to the screen of an old-fashioned British flea-pit cinema.

Slim has stated that this will most likely be the last CD release by The Hamsters and that all subsequent releases will be on the DVD format.

== Track listing ==
1. "Just Came Back" (Colin James/Burgess) – 4:43
2. "My Future Ex-Wife" (Barry Martin) – 4:50
3. "Taxi Driver" (Mickey Jupp) – 3:57
4. "A Thing Called Love" (Williams) – 5:38
5. "Brother Doctor, Sister Nurse" (Mickey Jupp) – 4:36
6. "Lucky In Love" (Castro/Lewis) – 4:18
7. "Love Don't Bother Me" (Flakne/Icon) – 6:01
8. "Burning The Church House Down" (Gordon/Owens) – 5:20
9. "Wouldn't Lay My Guitar Down" (Harrington) – 4:28
10. "Somebody's Leaving Somebody" (Olin/Costas/Malo) – 6:32
11. "Check Up From The Neck Up" (Barry Martin/Dave Bronze) – 3:52
12. "Switchboard Susan" (Mickey Jupp) – 3:39
13. "The Unforgiven" (Ketchum) – 4:58

== Musicians ==
- Snail's-Pace Slim – guitars, mandolin, lead vocals.
- Rev Otis Elevator – drums, backing vocals.
- Ms Zsa Zsa Poltergeist – bass, organ, strings, backing vocals.

=== Guest musicians ===
- Phil Hilborne – lead guitar (stereo right - track 13), horns & synthesizer (track 1)
- Jerry Stevenson – rhythm guitar (track 7)
- Reg Webb – synthesizer & piano (track 7)

== Production ==
- Mixed by Jerry Stevenson (tracks 3,5,6,7,8,9) and Phil Hilborne (tracks 1,2,4,10)
- Produced by The Hamsters, Jerry Stevenson, Phil Hilborne.
- Cover design by Phil Smee of Waldo's Design & Dream Emporium.
- Photo manipulation and hand tinting by Kurt Adkins
- Band photography by The Hamsters.
