= Basher: The Best of Nick Lowe =

Compilation album by Nick Lowe
- Released: 30 May 1989
- Genre: New wave, pub rock
- Length: 1:16:09
- Label: Columbia Records
- Producer: Nick Lowe

Basher: The Best of Nick Lowe is a 1989 compilation album by British singer-songwriter Nick Lowe.

== Critical reception ==
Duncan Holland of British music newspaper Music Week reviewed the album positively and named this collection "flawless".

== Track listing ==
All songs by Nick Lowe except where noted.

1. "So It Goes" – 2:33
2. "Heart of the City" – 2:01
3. "I Love the Sound of Breaking Glass" (Andrew Bodnar/Steve Goulding/Lowe) – 3:13
4. "Little Hitler" (Dave Edmunds/Lowe) – 2:59
5. "No Reason" – 3:32
6. "36 Inches High" – 2:58
7. "Marie Provost" – 2:49
8. "American Squirm" – 2:31
9. "Cracking Up" – 2:59
10. "Big Kick, Plain Scrap!" – 2:31
11. "Born Fighter" – 3:10
12. "Switch Board Susan" (Mickey Jupp) – 3:49
13. "Without Love" – 2:29
14. "Cruel to Be Kind" (Lowe/Ian Gomm) – 3:28
15. "When I Write the Book" (Lowe/Rockpile) – 3:17
16. "Heart" – 3:42
17. "Ragin' Eyes" – 2:38
18. "Time Wounds All Heels" (Carlene Carter/Simon Climie/Lowe) – 2:45
19. "Maureen" – 3:07
20. "Half a Boy and Half a Man" – 2:56
21. "7 Nights to Rock" (Henry Glover/Louis Innis/Buck Trail) – 2:47
22. "She Don't Love Nobody" (John Hiatt) – 3:23
23. "The Rose of England" – 3:26
24. "I Knew the Bride (When She Used to Rock and Roll)" – 4:27
25. "Lovers Jamboree" (Paul Carrack/Lowe) – 3:42
