= Labour of Lust =

Studio album by Nick Lowe
- Released: 9 June 1979
- Recorded: 1978–1979
- Studios: Eden, London; Love, Helsinki, Finland (except: "American Squirm": 1978)
- Genre: Power pop
- Length: 32:40
- Labels: Radar (UK), Columbia (US)
- Producer: Nick Lowe

Nick Lowe chronology
| Jesus of Cool (1978) | Labour of Lust (1979) | Nick the Knife (1982) |

Singles from Labour of Lust
- 1. "Cracking Up" Released: 1979; 2. "Cruel to Be Kind" Released: 1979; 3. "Switchboard Susan" Released: 1979

Labour of Lust is an album by British singer-songwriter Nick Lowe. Produced by Lowe, it was released in 1979 by Radar Records in the UK and Columbia Records in the US. It was recorded and released at the same time as Dave Edmunds' Repeat When Necessary and features the same Rockpile personnel. It led off with "Cruel to Be Kind," Lowe's only major US hit.

The American version of this record had a slightly different track listing, with "Endless Grey Ribbon" being deleted and replaced with the UK single A-side, "American Squirm." The latter song includes members of Elvis Costello & The Attractions, namely Elvis Costello on backing vocals, Bruce Thomas on bass and Pete Thomas on drums. Credited to "Nick Lowe and His Sound," the B-side of this single was Elvis & The Attractions' version of the Lowe-penned "(What's So Funny 'Bout) Peace, Love & Understanding?" "Endless Grey Ribbon" was later issued in America as the B-side of the "Cruel to Be Kind" single.

Labour of Lust was released on CD in 1990 by Demon/Fiend in Europe and Columbia in North America, but quickly fell out of print. Yep Roc Records reissued the album on CD on 15 March 2011, containing all tracks from the US and UK versions, as well as "Basing Street," the B-side of both the UK single "Cracking Up" and the North American single "Switchboard Susan."

== Cover design ==
The album cover and corresponding ad campaign were designed by Barney Bubbles, who designed the artwork for virtually all of the early albums and 45's by Lowe, Elvis Costello, Ian Dury, the Damned, and many other Stiff Records and Radar Records artists. It featured a distinctive "Hamer & sickle" logo, fashioning the body and snapped neck of Lowe's Hamer bass guitar into a pop-art Hammer and sickle, the symbol of proletarian solidarity from the Russian Revolution. This logo was also used on the sleeve of the 45 release of "Cracking Up." Bubbles's original mockup of the logo, which recently sold at auction, is featured in the gatefold sleeve of the 2011 Yep Roc reissue of the album.

== Critical reception ==
Professional ratings
Review scores
| Source | Rating |
|---|---|
| AllMusic | 5/5 stars |
| American Songwriter | 4/5 stars |
| The A.V. Club | A− |
| Pitchfork | 8.4/10 |
| Record Collector | 4/5 stars |
| Rolling Stone | 4/5 stars |
| Smash Hits | 7/10 |
| Spin | 7/10 |
| Spin Alternative Record Guide | 8/10 |
| The Village Voice | A |

The Globe and Mail wrote that "Lowe's ear for background is, in its own contemporary way, as inventive and dramatic as Phil Spector's was 15 years ago." The New York Times deemed Labour of Lust one of 1979's "most exuberant and finely crafted rock-and-roll albums."

== Track listing ==
=== U.K. version ===
All songs written by Nick Lowe except where noted.

1. "Cruel to Be Kind" (Lowe, Ian Gomm) – 3:31
2. "Cracking Up" – 2:59
3. "Big Kick, Plain Scrap!" – 2:28
4. "Born Fighter" – 3:09
5. "You Make Me" – 1:53
6. "Skin Deep" – 3:12
7. "Switch Board Susan" (Mickey Jupp) – 3:50
8. "Endless Grey Ribbon" – 3:17
9. "Without Love" – 2:29
10. "Dose of You" – 3:21
11. "Love So Fine" (Lowe, Dave Edmunds, Billy Bremner, Terry Williams) – 3:52

=== U.S. version ===
1. "Cruel to Be Kind" – 3:31
2. "Cracking Up" – 2:59
3. "Big Kick, Plain Scrap" – 2:28
4. "American Squirm" – 2:29
5. "You Make Me" – 1:53
6. "Skin Deep" – 3:12
7. "Switch Board Susan" – 3:50
8. "Dose of You" – 3:21
9. "Without Love" – 2:29
10. "Born Fighter" – 3:09
11. "Love So Fine" – 3:52

=== 2011 Yep Roc records ===
1. "Cruel to Be Kind" – 3:31
2. "Cracking Up" – 2:59
3. "Big Kick, Plain Scrap" – 2:28
4. "American Squirm" – 2:29
5. "Born Fighter" – 3:09
6. "You Make Me" – 1:53
7. "Skin Deep" – 3:12
8. "Switchboard Susan" – 3:50
9. "Endless Grey Ribbon" – 3:17
10. "Without Love" – 2:29
11. "Dose of You" – 3:21
12. "Love So Fine" – 3:52
13. "Basing Street" (Bonus Track) – 2:32

== Personnel ==
- Nick Lowe – bass and vocals
- Dave Edmunds & Billy Bremner – rhythm & solo guitars & backing vocals
- Terry Williams – drums

Additional personnel

- Huey Lewis – harmonica on "Born Fighter"
- Bob Andrews – Oberheim on "Endless Grey Ribbon"
- Elvis Costello – backing vocals on "American Squirm"
- Bruce Thomas – bass on "American Squirm"
- Pete Thomas – drums on "American Squirm"
- Roger Bechirian – recording

== Charts ==
| Chart (1979) | Peak position |
|---|---|
| Australian Albums (Kent Music Report) | 53 |
| Canada Top Albums/CDs (RPM) | 21 |
| Swedish Albums (Sverigetopplistan) | 20 |
| UK Albums (Official Charts) | 43 |
| US Billboard 200 | 31 |

== Certifications ==
| Region | Certification | Certified units/sales |
|---|---|---|
| Canada (Music Canada) | Gold | 50,000^{^} |
^{^} Shipments figures based on certification alone.
