= Electric Hamsterland =

Studio album by The Hamsters
- Released: 1990
- Recorded: Roundel Studios, Kent, 1990
- Genre: Blues rock
- Length: 45:50
- Label: On The Beach Recordings
- Producer: Jerry Stevenson

The Hamsters chronology
Electric Hamsterland (1990)	Hamster Jam (1991)

Electric Hamsterland (1990) is the debut studio album by the Hamsters. It consists entirely of Jimi Hendrix covers. This was the only time they recorded an album of totally non-original material. There was a limited release of the album in vinyl LP form.

The album was dedicated to Daphne Martin and Stevie Ray Vaughan.

== Track listing ==
1. "Purple Haze" – 4:12
2. "Voodoo Chile" – 7:20
3. "Fire" – 3:43
4. "Little Wing" – 3:06
5. "Spanish Castle Magic" – 4:35
6. "Foxy Lady" – 3:37
7. "Stone Free" – 3:52
8. "The Wind Cries Mary" – 3:36
9. "All Along the Watchtower" – 4:13
10. "Hey Joe" – 4:33
11. "Star-Spangled Banner" – 3:03

== Musicians ==
- Snail's-Pace Slim – guitars, vocals
- Rev Otis Elevator – drums
- Ms Zsa Zsa Poltergeist – bass

== Composing credits ==
All songs composed by Jimi Hendrix, published by Warner Chappell Music Ltd, except:

- "Stone Free" – composed by Jimi Hendrix, published by Dick James Music Ltd.
- "Hey Joe" – composed by William M. Roberts, published by Carlin Music Corp.
- "All Along the Watchtower" – composed by Bob Dylan, published by B. Feldman & Co. Ltd.
- "Star-Spangled Banner" – Traditional, arranged by The Hamsters.

== Production ==
- Jerry Stevenson – producer, engineer.
- Recorded at Roundel Studios, Kent.
- Mixed at Bedroomtone International, Essex.
- Distributed by Pinnacle Records.
- Jimi Hamster design by Phil Harris.
- Cover Design by Quentin Russell.
- Photography by Steve O'Connell
