= Live at the Union Chapel =

Live album by Procol Harum
- Released: 2004
- Recorded: 12 December 2003
- Venue: Union Chapel, Islington, London.
- Genre: Progressive rock
- Label: Eagle Records

Procol Harum chronology
| The Well's on Fire (2003) | Live at the Union Chapel (2004) | Secrets of the Hive (2007) |

Live at the Union Chapel is the second live album by Procol Harum, released in 2004.

It was the last Procol Harum album to feature Matthew Fisher on organ and the only time Procol Harum recorded "A Whiter Shade of Pale" with 3 verses (previous albums and single releases only contained 2 verses). It was recorded live at the Union Chapel, Islington, London.

== Track listing ==
All tracks On the DVD composed by Gary Brooker and Keith Reid; except where indicated

1. "Underture"
2. "Shine On Brightly"
3. "Pandora's Box"
4. "An Old English Dream"
5. "Grand Hotel"
6. "Homburg"
7. "Quite Rightly So" (Brooker, Fisher, Reid)
8. "Simple Sister"
9. "Weisselklenzenacht (The Signature)" (Fisher)
10. "Shadow Boxed"
11. "The Question" (Fisher, Reid)
12. "Wall Street Blues"
13. "This World Is Rich"
14. "As Strong As Samson"
15. "Every Dog Will Have His Day" (Brooker, Fisher, Reid)
16. "A Salty Dog"
17. "Conquistador"
18. "VIP Room"
19. "Whisky Train" (Trower, Reid)
20. "Good Captain Clack"
21. "A Whiter Shade of Pale" (Brooker, Fisher, Reid)

== Personnel ==
The Union Chapel
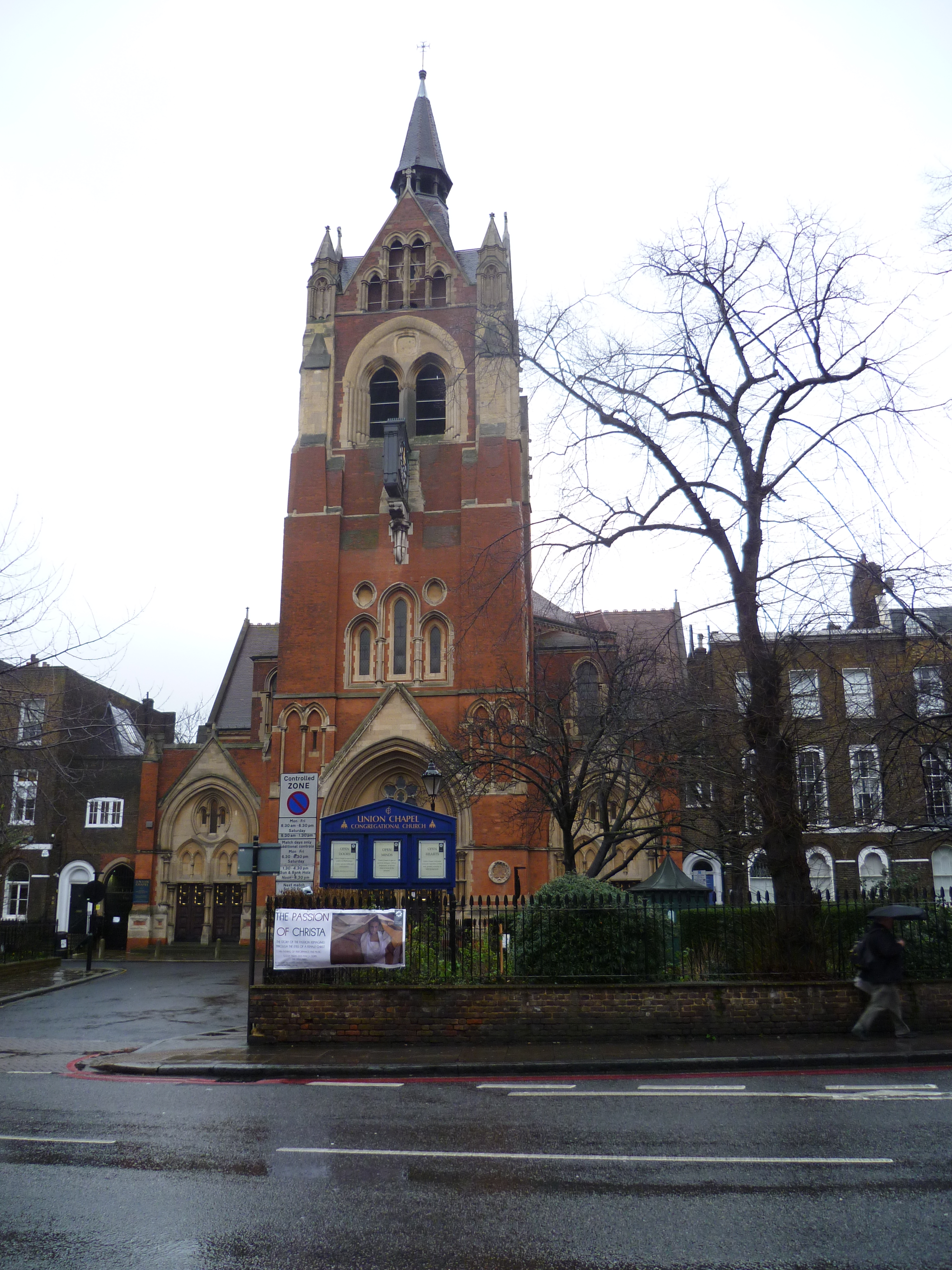
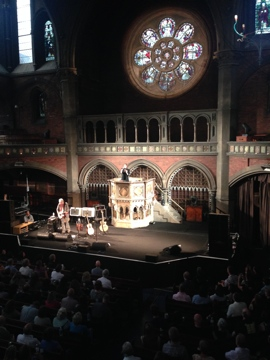

Procol Harum

- Gary Brooker – piano and vocals
- Mark Brzezicki – drums
- Matt Pegg – bass guitar
- Matthew Fisher – organ
- Geoff Whitehorn – guitar
- Keith Reid – lyrics

== Reception ==
Kevin Bryan of the Derby Telegraph called it "richly rewarding". Christel Loar of PopMatters rated it 6/10 stars and recommended it to Procol Harum fans who had not seen the concert, though she criticized the sound quality. Uncut rated it 3/5 stars and wrote that Brooker's voice has "not altered one iota" since 1967.
