= Jerry Stevenson =

Jerry Stevenson may refer to:

- Jerry Stevenson (musician)
- Jerry Stevenson (politician)
