= A Salty Dog (song) =

Single by Procol Harum

from the album A Salty Dog
- B-side: "Long Gone Geek"
- Released: 1969
- Studio: Abbey Road Studios
- Genre: Progressive rock
- Length: 4:41
- Label: Regal Zonophone
- Songwriters: Gary Brooker, Keith Reid
- Producer: Matthew Fisher

Procol Harum singles chronology
| "Quite Rightly So" (1968) | "A Salty Dog" (1969) | "Conquistador" (1972) |

"A Salty Dog" is a song by the English rock band Procol Harum. Written by Gary Brooker and Keith Reid, it was released as the lead single off the band's 1969 album A Salty Dog. It was also included on the 1972 album Procol Harum Live: In Concert with the Edmonton Symphony Orchestra.

== Background and composition ==
The song's lyrics were written by Keith Reid and its music was written by Gary Brooker when he was on tour in Switzerland; Brooker also sang. It was featured on the band's 1969 album, A Salty Dog. Reid's lyrics describe sailors crossing the unknown seas with the crew dying during their voyage. The string arrangement recalls Frédéric Chopin. The song is reportedly one of Reid's favourites.

According to band biographer Claes Johansen, organist Matthew Fisher did not play on the recording, and Robin Trower only played an acoustic guitar faintly buried in the mix.

== Release and reception ==
"A Salty Dog" peaked at #44 on the UK Singles Chart. BBC Radio DJ John Peel explained the lack of chart success:

... and, er, that was 'A Salty Dog,' which was once released as a single, and should have done, er, a lot better in fact as a single than it did; unfortunately, um, seeing as it was longer than two-and-a-half minutes long and isn't exactly a bright tempo, a lot of my colleagues won't play it because they feel that, er, more than two-and-a-half minutes without some, er, feeble quip from them, er, is going to make the world a sadder place ...

The song was generally well received by music critics. Matthew Greenwald of Allmusic praised the narrative as "brilliant" and carried by "an expansive melody and epic performance from the entire band". The string arrangement was "fabulous" and "only adds grandeur to the song and recording, making this one of the group's most fully realized moments". Perhaps the greatest praise came from Melody Maker's Chris Welch, who called it "their finest hour" and "one of the greatest pop singles to emerge in recent years". He added, "The tune is beautiful, the arrangement brilliant, the performance perfect". Cash Box described it as a "stunning effort." Record World said that "Procol Harum is as eerie and gothic as ever."

== Chart performance ==
| Chart (1969) | Peak position |
|---|---|
| UK Singles Chart | 44 |
| Canada RPM Magazine (1972) | 84 |
| Netherlands | 3 |

== Cover versions ==
The song was covered by Marc Almond on his 1986 album A Woman's Story, and by Transatlantic on the two-disc Special Edition of The Whirlwind, where it is sung by drummer Mike Portnoy. Sarah Brightman covered the song on her 1993 album Dive. Styx covered the song on their cover album Big Bang Theory (2005) with Lawrence Gowan on lead vocals.
