= Condensed Hamsters =

Greatest hits album by The Hamsters
- Released: 1990 / 2000
- Genre: Blues rock
- Length: 61:14
- Label: Rockin' Rodent Recordings
- Producer: The Hamsters

The Hamsters chronology
| Pet Sounds - 10 Years of Rodent Rock (1998) | Condensed Hamsters (1990) | They Live By Night (2002) |

Condensed Hamsters (1990) is a Hamsters album that was originally released only as an audio cassette (Music Cassette) compilation of the four original cassette only albums (recordings from 1988 to 1990) that were only available from the band's gigs. They never received a national distribution. Eventually the band stopped producing the tape albums, including this compilation, when their CD releases started to become popular.

Then in 2000, after years of requests from fans, it was decided to find the master tapes (no one knew where they were!) and remaster the album for a CD release. Eventually the masters were found in the back of a drawer in Slim's office and they were passed along to the band's regular sound guru, Jerry Stevenson. After a lot of audio repairs and 'sonic enhancement' the masters were deemed ready for CD and they were released to the general public, both at gigs, their website and worldwide via the band's official distributor, Pinnacle Records.

== Track listing ==
1. "Switchboard Susan" – 3:34
2. "Georgia Slop" – 3:36
3. "Linda Lu" – 4:36
4. "Hard Ridin' Papa" – 4:40
5. "Crazy 'Bout An Automobile" – 3:14
6. "The Walk" – 4:10
7. "Chevrolet" – 3:12
8. "They Called It Rock" – 3:41
9. "Sweet Little Lisa" – 4:43
10. "Pouring Water On A Drowning Man" – 3:44
11. "Double Trouble" – 9:19
12. "Fire Down Below" – 4:18
13. "Chequebook" – 3:54
14. "Brother Doctor, Sister Nurse" – 4:33
- Tracks 1–6 from Night of the Rocking Rodents
- Tracks 7–13 from Revenge of the Killer Hamsters
- Track 14 from Flasher Hamsters From Hell

== Musicians ==
- Snail's-Pace Slim — guitars, lead vocals.
- Rev Otis Elevator — drums, vocals.
- Ms Zsa Zsa Poltergeist — bass, vocals.

== Production ==
- Recorded by Johnny Holburn.
- Post-production sonic enhancement, editing and compiling by Jerry Stevenson.
- Produced by The Hamsters.
- Cover design by Phil Smee of Waldo's Design Emporium.
- Cover concept by The Hamsters.
- 'Breakfast illustration' design by Des Penny.
- Photography by Steve O'Connell (booklet) and Rob Petherbridge (inner tray).
