= Something Magic =

Studio album by Procol Harum
- Released: 25 February 1977
- Recorded: 1976
- Genres: Progressive rock, symphonic rock
- Length: 40:11
- Labels: Chrysalis; Repertoire (2000 German reissue)
- Producers: Procol Harum, Ron Albert, Howie Albert

Procol Harum chronology
Procol's Ninth (1975)	Something Magic (1977)	The Prodigal Stranger (1991)

Professional ratings
Review scores
Source	Rating
AllMusic	2.5/5 stars

Something Magic is the ninth studio album by Procol Harum, and was released in 1977.

Electing to work with producers Ron and Howie Albert when Leiber and Stoller (who had produced the band's preceding album) were not available, Procol Harum flew into Miami with more than enough material for their album. However, the Alberts rejected more than five of these tracks, leaving only four from the material the group had intended to use. Vocalist/composer/piano player Gary Brooker then offered up the epic "The Worm and The Tree", a piece by lyricist Keith Reid that Brooker had been toying with on and off for several years. Under mounting pressure to complete the musical composition and orchestral arrangements for the 19-minute epic (which according to Reid was about "how the press tried to break up the band") Brooker turned to local Miami arranger Mike Lewis to complete the orchestral arrangements for the title track "Something Magic", and band member Chris Copping to complete the woodwind arrangement for "Skating on Thin Ice".

With work completed on "The Worm and The Tree", Brooker previewed it for co-producers Ron and Howie Albert who approved of the piece (a surprise, given that it had a lot in common with the epic orchestral/progressive rock piece "In Held Twas In I" from Shine on Brightly). Guitarist Mick Grabham offered up his only composition, set to Reid's "The Mark of the Claw", to help fill out the album (on the 2009 Salvo reissue, Grabham is incorrectly credited with writing the single "Wizard Man" with Reid). The Alberts insisted that the band's steady drummer B.J. Wilson use a click track for the album, an unusual demand given his work on the band's previous releases. After this album was released, Copping left the band. Dee Murray (Elton John's bassist) replaced him for the North American tour promoting this album.

== Reception ==
The album was preceded by the single "Wizard Man", backed by Gary Brooker's instrumental "Backgammon" in the UK but paired with "Something Magic" in the United States. The single didn't chart in either the United Kingdom or the United States, and the album rose no higher than No. 146 on the U.S. Billboard charts. In Canada, it reached No. 84. It debuted at No. 13 in Denmark, before falling out of the Top 20. Something Magic would remain the last album released by Procol Harum until 1991, when Gary Brooker reunited with Keith Reid, Robin Trower, and Matthew Fisher (drummer B.J. Wilson having died prior to the reunion) for The Prodigal Stranger.

== 2009 Salvo reissue ==
Salvo reissued the entire discography of Procol Harum in 2009, remastered with bonus tracks. Something Magic was remastered by Nick Robbins. The bonus tracks included the B-side "Backgammon" as well as a demo of two tracks played live by the band but rejected for the album: "You'd Better Wait" and "This Old Dog". The bonus tracks were selected by Brooker and Reid for the reissue.

== Track listing ==
All songs written by Gary Brooker and Keith Reid except where noted.

Side one
No.	Title	Writer(s)	Length
1.	"Something Magic"		3:34
2.	"Skating on Thin Ice"		4:46
3.	"Wizard Man"		2:37
4.	"The Mark of the Claw"	Mick Grabham, Keith Reid	4:37
5.	"Strangers in Space"		6:02

Side two
No.	Title	Length
1.	"The Worm & the Tree" Part One "Introduction" "Menace" "Occupation"	7:48
2.	"The Worm & the Tree" Part Two "Enervation" "Expectancy" "Battle"	5:28
3.	"The Worm & the Tree" Part Three "Regeneration" "Epilogue"	5:19

Some versions of the album omit "Wizard Man"; even those which include the track omit its lyrics from the inner sleeve.

Salvo bonus tracks
No.	Title	Length
1.	"Backgammon"	3:23
2.	"You'd Better Wait"	4:44
3.	"This Old Dog"	3:41

== Personnel ==
Procol Harum

- Pete Solley – organ and synthesisers
- Chris Copping – bass guitar
- B. J. Wilson – drums
- Mick Grabham – guitar
- Gary Brooker – piano and vocals
- Keith Reid – lyrics

== Charts ==
Chart (1977)	Peak position
Canada Top Albums/CDs (RPM)	84
Dutch Albums (Album Top 100)	16
Finnish Albums (The Official Finnish Charts)	20
Norwegian Albums (VG-lista)	19
Swedish Albums (Sverigetopplistan)	23
US Billboard 200	147
