= Ragin' Eyes =

1983 Nick Lowe song

Single by Nick Lowe

from the album The Abominable Showman
- B-side: "Tanque-Rae"
- Released: April 1983
- Genre: Rock music
- Length: 2:38
- Label: F-Beat
- Songwriter: Nick Lowe
- Producers: Roger Béchirian, Nick Lowe

Nick Lowe singles chronology
"My Heart Hurts" (1982)	"Ragin' Eyes" (1983)	"Wish You Were Here" (1983)

"Ragin' Eyes" is a 1983 new wave song by Nick Lowe. Lowe spoke positively of the song, but noted his struggles in creating the right stylistic arrangement for it at the time. Released as a single in 1983, the song did not chart.

"Ragin' Eyes" continues to be performed by Lowe in his concerts and has appeared on Lowe's best-of compilations. It has also seen positive reception from music critics.

== Background ==
"Ragin' Eyes was written by Lowe during the early 1980s, a period that he described as "when [he] was starting to lose my way a bit, for various reasons." Given his artistic state at the time, he explained, "It's a song that, when I recorded it, I didn't quite know what I had. . . . I think I thought it was some sort of Cajun song or something like that. It couldn't make up its mind whether it needed to be played on a washboard or with a massive, like, '80s drum sound, so it wound up not being as effective as it would be if I recorded it now."

A music video was produced for the song. As described by The New Yorker, the video concludes with "Lowe, seated at a bar, [wearing] owlish spectacles, which are shattered by the glare of a sultry gal."

== Release ==
"Ragin' Eyes" was released as the first single from Lowe's 1983 album The Abominable Showman. It did not chart in the UK or US. Lowe attributed this lack of commercial success to his stylistic struggles, stating, "I think it could've been more popular at the time if I'd been able to grasp what I had there, but it's a great little tune."

Since its release, "Ragin' Eyes" has appeared on several compilations, such as Basher: The Best of Nick Lowe and Quiet Please... The New Best of Nick Lowe.

== Critical reception ==
Goldmine described "Ragin' Eyes" as one of Lowe's "stellar tunes" released after his first two studio albums. AllMusic's Stephen Thomas Erlewine, in an otherwise critical review of The Abominable Showman, stated, "[A] song as sharp as 'Raging Eyes,' with its wryly observed lyrics and infectious melody, makes it clear what the rest of the album is lacking." PopMatters, meanwhile, commented, "'Ragin' Eyes' sounds like something Buddy Holly would've cranked had he survived that plane crash." Rolling Stone named the song one of Lowe's many "deep cuts that would sound like a lost greatest-hits album unearthed in a vault", while Popdose described it as "finger-snapping rock".

== Live history ==
Lowe continues to perform the song live. He commented in 2024 that he and Los Straitjackets, his touring band, "do a great version of 'Ragin' Eyes'."
