= Switchboard Susan =

1979 single by Nick Lowe

"Switch Board Susan"

Single by Nick Lowe

from the album Labour of Lust
- B-side: "Basing Street"
- Released: October 1979
- Genre: Rock
- Length: 3:46
- Label: Columbia
- Songwriter: Mickey Jupp
- Producer: Nick Lowe

Nick Lowe singles chronology
"Cruel to Be Kind" (1979)	"Switch Board Susan" (1979)	"Stick It Where the Sun Don't Shine" (1982)

"Switchboard Susan" is a song written by Mickey Jupp and recorded by Nick Lowe for his 1979 album, Labour of Lust. The song was produced by Lowe.

Jupp originally wrote the song for his album Juppanese, which Lowe was producing. Jupp disliked the backing track that Lowe's band Rockpile produced for the song, calling it "shit from top to bottom" according to Lowe. Lowe received Jupp's permission to take the song for himself. He recalled:

"Mickey Jupp is touched with genius but he could be a difficult and contrary man. ... I nearly had to throw myself across the tracks to stop the train and prevent Rockpile from leaving town. But "Switchboard Susan" had a cracking backing track, so I offered to buy it off Mickey and he agreed. Then I stuck my vocal on it."

"Switchboard Susan" was released as a single in North America only. The follow-up to Lowe's biggest chart hit "Cruel to Be Kind", the single reached number 81 Canada and number 107 on the US pop chart.

== Cover versions ==
- Gary Brooker released a version of the song on his 1979 album, No More Fear of Flying.
- The Searchers released a version of the song on their 1979 album, The Searchers.
- Per Gessle and Niklas Strömstedt re-wrote the lyrics in Swedish and in 1980 the song was recorded by Rockfile. It was given the title "Marie i växeln", referring to an EMI employee.
- Jupp released his own version of the song as the B-side to his 1980 single, "Rooms in Your Roof".
- Rockpile released a version of the song on their 1980 live album, Live at Montreux 1980.
- The Hamsters released a version of the song on their 2004 album, Open All Hours.
