= Prairie Madness =

American musical duo

- Origin: Los Angeles and Marin County, California
- Genres: Rock, folk rock
- Years active: 1960–1970
- Label: Columbia
- Past members: Chris Ducey; Ed Millis

Prairie Madness is a guitar/piano duo that existed in the 1960s and 70s in Los Angeles and Marin County, California. It was composed of Chris Ducey and Ed Millis. Their self-titled album and its single, 'Shame The Children,' were co-produced by Matthew Fisher, Procol Harum organist, and Joel Sill.

== Personnel ==
- Chris Ducey - Acoustic and Electric guitars
- Ed Millis - Piano and Accordion
- Jack Conrad - Bass Guitar
- Richie Hayward - Drums
- Jim Young - Drums
- Matthew Fisher - Organ, Harpsichord
- Ralph Bryan - Electric Guitar
- Emil Richards - Assorted African Percussion
- Airto Moreira - Assorted Brazilian Percussion
- Richard Davis - Upright Bass

== See also ==
- Matthew Fisher
- Procol Harum
- Columbia Records
