= Joy Sarney =

English singer

Joy Sarney (born Florence Joy Crabtree; 1944) is an English singer known for the novelty song "Naughty Naughty Naughty", released as a single in 1977.

== Career ==
Sarney was born in Liverpool and started as a folk music and comedy performer in the Liverpool trio the Crabtrees in the mid-1960s, with her brother Hal and Derek Marsden. The Crabtrees performed in venues all over Merseyside, and their act embraced traditional, contemporary and humorous songs. She sang with the Mickey Jupp Band.

The song "Naughty Naughty Naughty" was a novelty love song between the singer and Mr Punch. "Naughty Naughty Naughty" was engineered by Chris Tsangarides at Morgan Studios in Willesden, North London. The single was issued by Alaska Records, owned by the record producer and musician John Schroeder. It reached number 26 on the UK Singles Chart in May 1977. A follow-up single, "Angling for a Kiss", was released in November 1977, but failed to make the charts, and Sarney remains a one-hit wonder.
