= A Salty Dog =

Studio album by Procol Harum
- Released: April 1969 (US); June 1969 (UK)
- Recorded: January – March 1969
- Studios: EMI Studios, London
- Genre: Progressive rock
- Length: 40:18
- Labels: Regal Zonophone, A&M
- Producer: Matthew Fisher

Procol Harum chronology
Shine On Brightly (1968)	A Salty Dog (1969)	Home (1970)

A Salty Dog is the third studio album by English rock band Procol Harum, released in 1969 by record labels Regal Zonophone and A&M.

== Content ==
A Salty Dog has an ostensibly nautical theme, as indicated by its cover (a pastiche of the famous Player's Navy Cut cigarette pack). Interspersed with straight rock, blues and pop items, A Salty Dog showed a slight change of direction from its predecessors, being thematically less obscure. The title track itself was the first Procol track to use an orchestra, as would be referred to in the live album performance released some three years later.

The album was the first record produced by Matthew Fisher, who quit the band soon after its release. This was also the last Procol Harum album to feature bass guitarist Dave Knights.

== Background and recording ==
A Salty Dog was recorded in March 1969. The musical tensions between Robin Trower and the rest of the group were beginning to show in this album, and although his guitar sound remains integral to most of the tracks, "Crucifiction Lane" (featuring a rare Trower vocal), in retrospect, shows that Trower was already moving in a different direction from the rest of the band. Still, this album is much more musically varied than the two previous albums, with three Fisher vocals and one by Trower. Many of the instruments the band used on A Salty Dog had been previously used on albums by the Beatles and the Shadows.

When Gary Brooker first performed "A Salty Dog" on piano with Keith Reid's lyrics for drummer B. J. Wilson, the room was filled with sunlight shining through the windows. Wilson, with a sunbeam on his face, told Brooker he thought "it was the most beautiful song he had ever heard." The piano intro riff of the title track is inspired by a train whistle that Brooker heard in Switzerland.

== Release ==
A Salty Dog was released in the US in April 1969 by the record label A&M, and June 1969 in the UK by record label Regal Zonophone. The title track, backed with "Long Gone Geek", reached number 44 in the UK Singles Chart in 1969 and the album itself number 27 in the Albums Chart. In Canada, the album reached number 25.

== Reception ==
Professional ratings
Review scores
Source	Rating
AllMusic	4.5/5 stars

John Mendelson, writing for Rolling Stone, called it "a confusing album. At its best it represents the group's greatest success to date with the brand of rock for which the group is known; at its worst it is both surprisingly mediocre and trivial". Robert Christgau was more enthusiastic in The Village Voice, giving it an "A+" in the first installment of his "Consumer Guide" column, although he later said the printed grade was "a mistake" and should have probably been a "B+".

In a retrospective review, Bruce Eder of AllMusic wrote, "This album, the group's third, was where they showed just how far their talents extended across the musical landscape, from blues to R&B to classical rock. In contrast to their hastily recorded debut, or its successor, done to stretch their performance and composition range", calling the title track "one of the finest songs ever to come from Procol Harum and one of the best pieces of progressive rock ever heard".

== Track listing ==
All lyrics are written by Keith Reid.

Side one
No.	Title	Music	Length
1.	"A Salty Dog"	Gary Brooker	4:41
2.	"The Milk of Human Kindness"	Brooker	3:47
3.	"Too Much Between Us"	Robin Trower, Brooker	3:45
4.	"The Devil Came from Kansas"	Brooker	4:38
5.	"Boredom"	Matthew Fisher, Brooker	4:34

Side two
No.	Title	Music	Length
6.	"Juicy John Pink"	Trower	2:08
7.	"Wreck of the Hesperus"	Fisher	3:49
8.	"All This and More"	Brooker	3:52
9.	"Crucifiction Lane"	Trower	5:03
10.	"Pilgrim's Progress"	Fisher	4:32

1999 reissue bonus tracks
No.	Title	Length
11.	"Long Gone Geek" (B-side of the single release of "A Salty Dog")
12.	"All This And More"
13.	"The Milk of Human Kindness" (Instrumental Version)
14.	"Pilgrim's Progress" (Instrumental Version)
15.	"McGreggor" (previously unreleased track, originally intended for Shine On Brightly)
16.	"Still There'll Be More"

2009 reissue bonus tracks
No.	Title	Writer(s)	Length
11.	"Long Gone Geek"	Reid, Brooker, Fisher	3:20
12.	"Goin' Down Slow" (Live in the USA, April 1969)	James B. Oden	7:56
13.	"Juicy John Pink" (Live in the USA, April 1969)	Robin Trower, Reid	2:37
14.	"Crucifiction Lane" (Live in the USA, April 1969)	Trower, Reid	4:34
15.	"Skip Softly (My Moonbeams) / Also Sprach Zarathustra" (Live in the USA, April 1969)	Brooker, Reid, Richard Strauss	5:26
16.	"The Milk of Human Kindness" (Take 1; Raw Track)	Brooker, Reid	3:51

== Personnel ==
Procol Harum

- Gary Brooker – vocals (1–4, 6, 8), piano, celeste, three stringed guitar, bells, harmonica, recorder, woods
- Matthew Fisher – organ, vocals (5, 7, 10), marimba, acoustic guitar, piano, recorder, rhythm guitar
- Dave Knights – bass guitar
- Barrie Wilson – drums, conga drums, tabla
- Robin Trower – lead guitar, vocal (9), acoustic guitar, sleigh tambourine
- John "Kellogs" Kalinowski – bosun's whistle, refreshments
- Keith Reid – lyrics

Technical

- Gary Brooker – orchestral arrangements (1, 8)
- Matthew Fisher – orchestral arrangements (7); producer
- Ken Scott – engineer (1–5, 8–10)
- Ian Stuart – engineer (6)
- Henry Lewy – engineer (7)
- Dickinson – artwork, design

== Charts ==
Chart (1969)	Peak position
Canada Top Albums/CDs (RPM)	25
Dutch Albums (Album Top 100)	8
Norwegian Albums (VG-lista)	19
UK Albums (Official Charts)	27
US Billboard 200	32

Chart (2009)	Peak position
UK Independent Albums (Official Charts)	47
