= The Well's on Fire =

Studio album by Procol Harum
- Released: 4 March 2003
- Recorded: 2003
- Genre: Progressive rock; art rock; blues rock; hard rock
- Length: 59:01
- Label: Eagle
- Producer: Rafe McKenna, Procol Harum

Procol Harum chronology
The Prodigal Stranger (1991)	The Well's on Fire (2003)	Novum (2017)

The Well's on Fire is the eleventh studio album by Procol Harum, released in 2003. The album was Matthew Fisher's last studio album with the band (his last live release with them was Live at Union Chapel, recorded in December 2003 and including many of the songs from the studio album). It was also their last studio album to feature lyrics from Keith Reid.

== Reception ==
Professional ratings
Review scores
Source	Rating
AllMusic	4/5 stars
Encyclopedia of Popular Music	4/5 stars

AllMusic hailed The Well's on Fire as Procol Harum's "finest album in nearly 30 years", remarking that it goes for a more rock-based sound than its predecessor The Prodigal Stranger and recaptures the worthy elements of the band's heyday without relying solely on nostalgia. Individually noting the still potent talents of core members Matthew Fisher, Gary Brooker, and Keith Reid, they concluded that Procol Harum "have demonstrated that they're capable of making relevant music again."

== Track listing ==
All music by Gary Brooker and lyrics by Keith Reid, except where noted.

1. "An Old English Dream"
2. "Shadow Boxed"
3. "A Robe of Silk"
4. "The Blink of an Eye"
5. "The VIP Room"
6. "The Question" (Matthew Fisher, Keith Reid)
7. "This World Is Rich (For Stephen Maboe)"
8. "Fellow Travellers" - based on "Lascia Ch'io Pianga" by George Frideric Handel (Fisher, Reid)
9. "The Wall Street Blues"
10. "The Emperor's New Clothes"
11. "So Far Behind"
12. "Every Dog Will Have His Day" (Brooker, Fisher, Reid)
13. "Weisselklenzenacht (The Signature)" (Fisher)

== Personnel ==
Procol Harum

- Gary Brooker – piano, vocals
- Matthew Fisher – organ
- Geoff Whitehorn – guitar
- Matt Pegg – bass guitar
- Mark Brzezicki – drums, percussion

with:

- Roger Taylor – backing vocals (2)

Technical

- Rafe McKenna – producer
- Joshua J Macrae – engineer
