= The Prodigal Stranger =

Studio album by Procol Harum
- Released: 27 August 1991
- Studio: Black Barn, Surrey, England; Old Barn, South Croydon, England; Stone Room, London, England; The Loft, Bronxville, NY
- Genre: Pop rock
- Length: 51:56
- Label: Zoo Entertainment, Esoteric Recordings
- Producer: Matt Noble, Gary Brooker, Matthew Fisher, Keith Reid

Procol Harum chronology
Something Magic (1977)	The Prodigal Stranger (1991)	The Well's on Fire (2003)

The Prodigal Stranger is the tenth studio album by Procol Harum, released in 1991. Recorded after a 14-year break, it met with an underwhelming response from listeners but served to kick off a largely successful reunion for the band.

== Background ==
The album is dedicated to the memory of B. J. Wilson, who had been the drummer on all of the group's previous albums, but not on The Prodigal Stranger. The Procol Harum reformation began with just Gary Brooker and Keith Reid working together to write songs, only later giving serious consideration to involving other members of Procol Harum.

Although Matthew Fisher hadn't played with the band since 1969's A Salty Dog, he stated at the time "I felt that I just sort of slotted back into it, like it had only been like the day before ... so it's not so much déjà vu as just carrying on where we left off."

The song "A Dream in Ev'ry Home" started with a riff which Fisher thought up at home and put a bass line and drum part on with a sequencer.

Reid said of the song "The Truth Won't Fade Away", "I saw it as being about civilisations like the Inca civilisation and other ancient civilisations, growing and being there and being wiped out and new ones taking over from them. I saw it as a movie in my mind."

The reunion of the surviving four original members did not last long. Robin Trower performed on the album and co-wrote the music for "All Our Dreams are Sold", but he declined to join the group on the following tour and was replaced by Tim Renwick. The tour to promote the album was well received and attended in both Europe and the United States, reflecting the respect and status of the group, but was not reflected in album sales. The album didn't chart in the Billboard Top 100 in the United States, although the single "All Our Dreams Are Sold" got decent airplay, rising to number 29 on the Billboard Mainstream Rock Charts, but just number 95 in Canada.

== Reception ==
Professional ratings
Review scores
Source	Rating
AllMusic	2.5/5 stars

The review at Allmusic stated that the absence of original drummer B. J. Wilson severely hurt the vitality of the band and that while Brooker was in fine voice, lyricist Keith Reid was "in a mundane, conventional mode" and that the frequent use of synthesizers in place of Matthew Fisher's Hammond organ made the band often sound like a generic AOR group. Entertainment Weekly stated "...though the songs in The Prodigal Stranger are occasionally overproduced, singer Gary Brooker's powerfully soulful voice still makes the difference every time. Most of The Prodigal Stranger would have sounded perfectly wonderful in 1969 – and in this case, that's a compliment."

== Track listing ==
No.	Title	Music	Length
1.	"The Truth Won't Fade Away"	Gary Brooker, Matthew Fisher, Keith Reid
2.	"Holding On"	Brooker, Reid
3.	"Man with a Mission"	Brooker, Matt Noble, Reid
4.	"(You Can't) Turn Back the Page"	Brooker, Noble, Reid
5.	"One More Time"	Brooker, Fisher, Reid
6.	"A Dream in Ev'ry Home"	Brooker, Fisher, Reid
7.	"The Hand That Rocks the Cradle"	Brooker, Thompson, Reid
8.	"The King of Hearts"	Brooker, Noble, Reid
9.	"All Our Dreams Are Sold"	Brooker, Robin Trower, Reid
10.	"Perpetual Motion"	Brooker, Noble, Reid
11.	"Learn to Fly"	Brooker, Fisher, Reid
12.	"The Pursuit of Happiness"	Brooker, Noble, Reid

Bonus Tracks 2018 Reissue
No.	Title	Length
13.	"Into the Flood (Demo)"
14.	"A Real Attitude (Demo)"
15.	"Holding On (Live at SWR Radio, Germany 2003)"

== Personnel ==
Procol Harum

- Gary Brooker - piano and vocals
- Matthew Fisher - organ
- Robin Trower - guitar
- Mark Brzezicki - drums
- Dave Bronze - bass guitar
- Keith Reid - lyrics

Additional personnel

- Jerry Stevenson - guitar, mandolin
- Henry Spinetti - drums on "The Truth Won't Fade Away"
- Steve Lange, Maggie Ryder, Miriam Stockley – backing vocals on "Holding On"

Production

- Ted Jensen at Sterling Sound, NYC - mastering
