= Mickey Jupp =

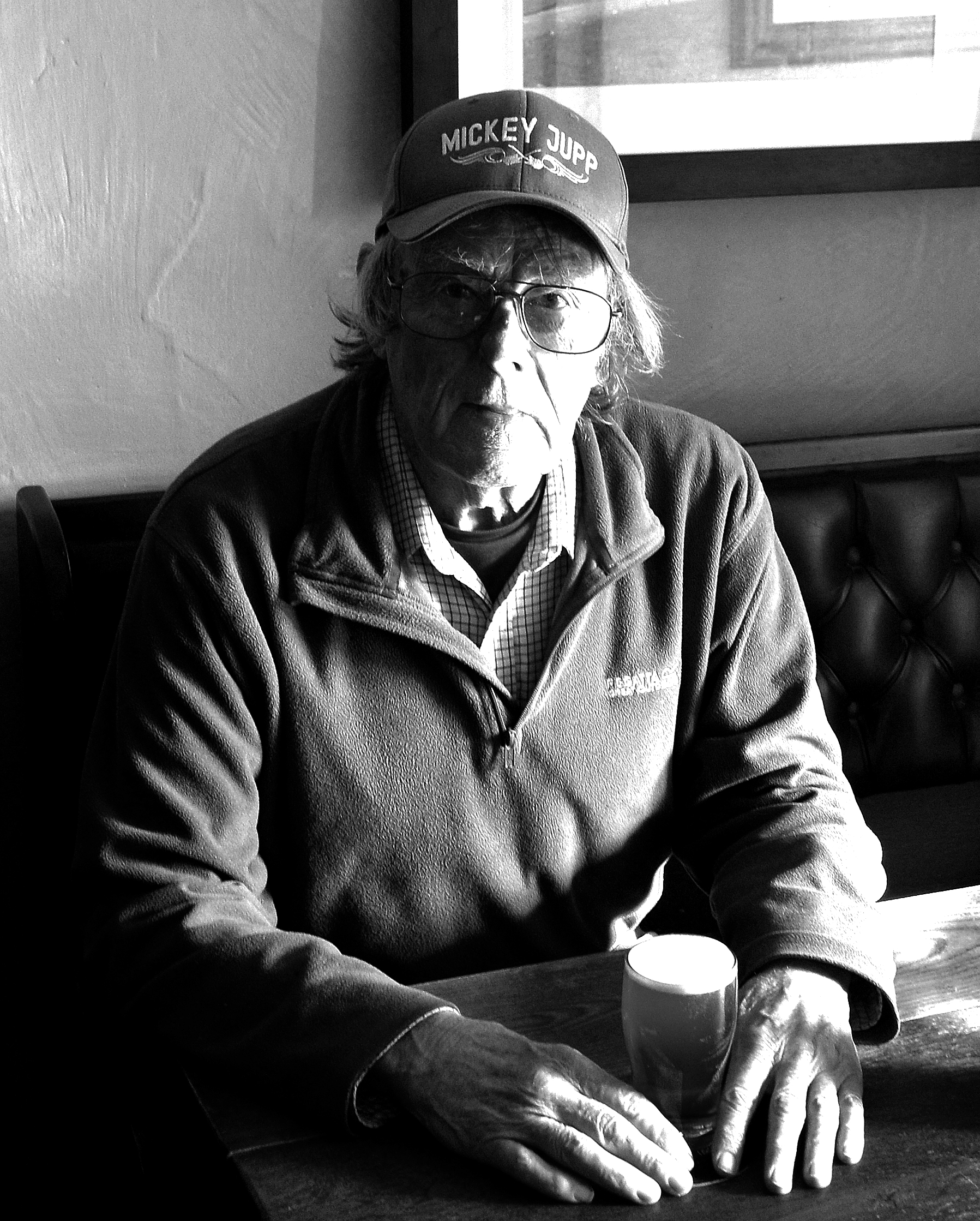

Background information
- Born: Michael Graham Jupp; 6 March 1944 (age 82); Worthing, Sussex, England
- Genres: Rock, pub rock, rhythm and blues
- Occupations: Musician, guitarist, songwriter
- Instruments: Guitar, piano
- Years active: 1963–present
- Labels: Bell Records, Vertigo, Stiff Conquest Music
- Website: www.MickeyJupp.com

Michael Graham "Mickey" Jupp (born 6 March 1944, in Worthing, Sussex, England) is an English musician and songwriter, mainly associated with the Southend music scene.

== Career ==
Jupp played in several Southend bands after leaving art college in 1962 and was in the R&B group the Orioles (1963 to late 1965), which included Mo Witham (guitar, vocals) and Bob Clouter (drums), but the band were never recorded.

After a break from music, Jupp formed Legend in 1968, who were signed to Bell Records. They released an eponymous album Legend, playing a mix of pop, rockabilly and blues rock styles using no electric instruments. The original band: Nigel Dunbar (drums), Chris East (guitar, vocals and harmonica) and Steve Geere (string bass and vocals), who recorded this album with Jupp (guitar, piano and vocals), split soon afterwards, so Jupp assembled a new line-up, with Mo Witham on guitar, John Bobin on bass and Bill Fifield on drums. A recording deal with Vertigo produced a second album, in 1970, using the same line-up. Confusingly, this album was also called Legend, but is usually referred to as the "Red Boot" album, after the cover picture. Fifield left to join T.Rex (where he was renamed Bill Legend, after the band he had left, by Marc Bolan), and was replaced on drums by Bob Clouter who had played with Jupp in the Orioles. This line-up recorded the second Vertigo album Moonshine issued in 1972 (and re-released on CD in 2007), after which the band broke up.

Returning to Southend, Jupp pursued a low-key existence until the pub-rock revolution (spearheaded by local bands such as Dr. Feelgood, for whom he wrote the hit single "Down at the Doctors") created a fresh interest in rock and roll. He signed to Stiff Records in 1978, and they initially released a compilation album of the first three Legend albums, which was also called Legend, giving three albums with this title. This was followed by his first solo album, Juppanese, an album in two different styles. The first half was recorded with Rockpile and produced by Nick Lowe, and is in a simple raw style, whereas the second half, produced by Gary Brooker of Procol Harum, was slicker. The album had a cover photo of Jupp sitting at a table of oriental food, pulling at the corners of his eyes. Jupp had a long-standing connection with Procol Harum; Brooker, then with R&B group the Paramounts, was one of his early idols. When Procol's bassist David Knights went into management, Legend were his first act. He also produced their final album Moonshine. Robin Trower also produced Legend's second single "Georgia George Part 1" which was actually Jupp backed by Mo Witham and Procol's Matthew Fisher and B.J. Wilson.

The follow-up album Long Distance Romancer (1979), was produced by Godley and Creme, and has a slick, highly produced, sound, which was generally seen as less successful.

Jupp went on to release a further seven solo albums, some appearing on Swedish and German labels. His songs have been recorded by Rick Nelson, Elkie Brooks, the Judds, Chris Farlowe, Delbert McClinton, Nick Lowe, Dave Edmunds, Gary Brooker, the Hamsters, Dr. Feelgood, Roger Chapman, and the Searchers.

At one time the Mickey Jupp Band had Joy Sarney as its vocalist.

In February 2009, the early Legend line-up of Chris East, Mo Witham, John Bobin, Bob Clouter and Mickey Jupp self-released a new album, Never Too Old To Rock, featuring a selection of Jupp–East songs written over the previous twenty years.

In 2021, Jupp signed to Conquest Music, with a view to releasing a series of albums containing songs he wrote and recorded at his home in Boot, Eskdale, Cumbria, England. The series of albums is "the Boot Legacy". Conquest Music subsequently announced that the first album in the series Up Snakes, Down Ladders would be released on 5 August 2022, preceded by a five track digital only sampler the "I'd Love to Boogie" EP and that the second album in the series would be released before Christmas.

== Appreciation ==
On 6 February 2015, most of a two-hour edition of the Belgian radio show Dr Boogie on Classic 21 was dedicated to Jupp who was described (in French) as a 'hidden treasure of rock', a 'white Chuck Berry'. and a musician 'almost without ego'.

In August 2015, an authorised biography of Mickey Jupp, entitled Hole in my Pocket: the true legend of Mickey Jupp, the rock and roll genius who declined to be a star, written by Mike Wade, was published by Amazon/South Wing Books.

== Discography ==
(Album titles in italics, singles are 7-inch 45 rpm versions unless noted)

=== With Legend ===
1969

- Legend Bell SBLL 115 (UK) 6027 (US) (re-released on CD Repertoire Records 2007 REP-5066)
- "National Gas" b/w "Heather on the Hill" Bell BLL-1048 (UK) Bell 2C-006-90305 (France)
- "Wouldn't You" b/w "Heather on the Hill" Bell B-808 (US)
- "Georgia George Part 1" b/w "July' Bell Bll-1082 (UK)

1970

- Legend (a.k.a. the 'Red Boot' album) Vertigo 6360019 (re-released on CD 1990 Line 9.00069, Repertoire Records 4061CX and 2007 REP-1064)
- "Life" b/w "Late Last Night" Vertigo 6059-021 (UK & Germany, German version came in a picture sleeve)

1971

- "Life" b/w "Late Last Night" Vertigo 6059-021 (Italy, in a picture sleeve different from the German version)
- "Don't You Never" b/w "Someday" Vertigo 6059-036 (UK)

1972

- Moonshine Vertigo 6360063 (re-released on CD 1990 Repertoire Records 4062CX and 2006 REP-5073)

1978

- Mickey Jupp's Legend Stiff Records GET-2 (compilation of Legend material with A-side of Jupp's solo single on Arista) (UK)
- "My Typewriter" b/w "Nature's Radio" Stiff Records UP-1 (Promo only, B-side Mickey Jupp's Arista single A-side, released to promote the Mickey Jupp's Legend compilation LP release) (UK)

2008

- Never Too Old To Rock (a.k.a. "The Red Brogue Album") (CD only, features Moonshine-era band and Chris East) Wild Bird Records/mickeyjupp.com (UK)

2012

- A Living Legend: Legend Live At The Riga, 17th of March 2012 (2-CD Set only, reunion of the Moonshine-era band) Firehouse/mickeyjupp.com (UK)

=== Solo releases ===
1977

- "Nature's Radio" b/w "Down at the Doctor's" Arista 136 (UK)

1978

- Juppanese Stiff Records SEEZ-10 (UK) (Re-released on CD 1987 Line 9.00061, 1994 Repertoire REP-4441-WY and 2006 REP-1084, Germany) AllMusic link
- "Old Rock 'n' Roller" b/w "S.P.Y." Stiff Records BUY-36 (UK) MO-1859 (Spain) 6.12-390 and as a 12-inch single 6.20-006 (Germany) SRS-510.099 (Netherlands)
- "Down in Old New Orleans" b/w "Making Friends" Stiff Records K-7444 (Australia)
- "My Typewriter" b/w "Nature's Radio" Stiff Records UP-1 (Promo only, A-side by Legend, released to promote the Mickey Jupp's Legend compilation LP release)

1979

- Long Distance Romancer Chrysalis CHR-1261 (UK) 6307-686 (Germany) (Reissued on CD 1995 Line Records LICD-9.0003 and 2013 Repertoire Records REP-1168) AllMusic link
- "You Made A Fool Out of Me" b/w "Do You Know What I Mean" Chrysalis CHS-2384 (UK) 101.153 (Netherlands in picture sleeve)
- "Rooms in Your Roof" b/w "Switch Board Susan" Chrysalis CHS-2388 (UK)

1980

- Oxford Line LLP-5083 (Germany) (Reissued on CD 1997 Line Records LICD-9.013430 and 2013 Repertoire Records REP-1167)

1981

- "Don't Talk To Me" b/w "Junk in My Trunk" Good Foot G.F.R. 001 (reissued on Stiff Records GFR-001 in picture sleeve) (UK)
- The BBC Tapes Line 6.20-006 (German 12-inch single featuring 4 tracks recorded live at The BBC Studios 28 June 1978, also released in white vinyl, Line LIEP 3.000005-E, reissued in 1983)

1982

- Some People Can't Dance A&M AMLH-68535 (UK & Europe) SP-9076 (Canada) (Re-released on CD 1987 Line Records LICD-9.00069) AllMusic link
- "Some People Can't Dance" b/w "Virginia Weed" A&M AMS-12.9209 12" Maxi-Single (Europe)
- "Modern Music" b/w "Taxi Driver" A&M AMS-8208 (UK)
- "Joggin'" b/w "Feeling Free" A&M AMS-8222 (UK)
- "Joggin'" b/w "Daisy Mayes (live)" Line 6.13532-AC (Germany)
- "Modern Music" b/w "Taxi Driver" A&M AMS-8208

1983

- Shampoo, Haircut and Shave A&M AMLH-68559 (Netherlands) (Re-released on CD 2013 Hux HUXCD-133 UK) AllMusic link
- "Stormy Sunday Lunchtime" b/w "Reading Glasses" A&M AM-128 (UK)
- "Boxes and Tins" b/w "Reading Glasses" A&M AM-145 (UK)

1984

- "Only for Life" b/w "Animal Crackers" Towerbell TOW-55 (also released as a 12-inch single, 12-TOW-55)

1987

Oddities CD only, Line LICD-9.00464 (Germany) (CD compilation of BBC sessions, singles, and unreleased tracks)

1988

- "X" CD only, Waterfront WF-041 (UK) Line Records 9.00513, 1994 9.00534 and 1996 Raffm 9.00534 AllMusic link
- "Claggin' On" b/w "Driving on Your Lights" Waterfront WFS-40 (UK)

1991

- As The Yeahs Go By CD only, On The Beach Recordings FOAM-2 (UK) 1991 Line LICD-9.01026 (Germany)

1992

- Juppanese/Long Distance Romancer Line LICD 9.21188S (2-CD Set Reissue)

1994

- You Say Rock CD only, Gazell Music AB, GAFCD-1000 (Sweden)

2004

- Live at the BBC CD only, (John Peel and Stuart Coleman sessions and two In Concert shows from 1978 & 1979) Hux Records HUX053 (UK) AllMusic link
- You Say Rock CD only, Gazelle Music GAFCD-1000 (Sweden) Crisis 500-014-2 (Holland)
- "Anything You Say" and "Anything You Say (instrumental)" (a.k.a. "The Blue Single") Gazell GAZSI-100, CD single (Sweden)
- "You Wear My Ring" and "You Wear My Ring (instrumental)" (a.k.a. "The Red Single") Gazell GAZSI-106, CD single (Sweden)

2005

- "Modern Music" and "Modern Music (Modern Mix)" (a.k.a. "The Green Single") Gazell GAZSI-109, CD single (Sweden)

2009

- Country and Northern: Collector's Edition Volume 1 CD only, Wild Bird Records/mickeyjupp.com (credited to Chris East & Mickey Jupp) (UK)

2010

- Favourites CD only, Gallery Records MJF-1 (Private Pressing) (Sweden)

2011

- The Boot Tapes-11/11: Mickey Jupp & Mo Witham-Live CD only, Wild Bird Records/mickeyjupp.com (UK)

2012

- Nil Lyricus Shetlandium, Collector's Edition – Volume 2 CD only, Wild Bird Records/mickeyjupp.com (credited to Chris East & Mickey Jupp) (UK)

2013

- Live At Rockpalast CD & DVD Set, Repertoire 5284 (CD & DVD of Jupp's performance recorded at WDR-STUDIO A, Köln, Germany, 17.12.1979) (Germany)

2014

- "Kiss me quick, Squeeze me slow" Retrospective collection with 3CDs and a DVD.

2022

- "I’d Love to Boogie EP", digital only, Conquest Music.
- Up Snakes, Down Ladders The Boot Legacy, Volume 1. CD & LP, Conquest Music.

2023

- Hallelujah To Amen The Boot Legacy, Volume 2. CD & LP, Conquest Music.

2024

- "Function To Function EP", digital only, Conquest Music.
- "Juppy Christmas EP", digital only, Conquest Music.
- Times Like These The Boot Legacy, Volume 3. CD & LP, Conquest Music.

2025

- Dance With Me The Boot Legacy, Volume 4. CD, Conquest Music.
- Rock & Roll Time The Boot Legacy, Volume 5. CD, Conquest Music

=== Other album appearances ===
1971

- Heads Together/First Round Vertigo 6059-045, Compilation of Vertigo artist features Legend's "Foxfield Junction" (UK)
- The Vertigo Trip Vertigo 6641-006, Australia and New Zealand only compilation of Vertigo artists, features Legend's "Hole in My Pocket"

1978

- Be Stiff Tour Sampler Stiff DEAL-1, Compilation promoting the "Be Stiff" tour, only available by mail order. Was also available on the train that transported the tour from venue to venue. Features the Jupp tracks "Pilot" and "Making Friends" (UK)
- Be Stiff Route 78 Tour Stiff ODD-1, Compilation promoting the "Be Stiff" tour, only available by mail order. Promo copies also exist. Jupp performs "Be Stiff" twice, with his band and with the entire ensemble. (UK)
- Stiff Sounds: Can't Start Dancin' Stiff Sounds Vol. 3 Stiff SOUNDS-3, Promo LP only, sold through "Sounds Magazine," contains the Jupp tracks "Making Friends" and "You Made A Fool Out of Me" (UK)

1979

- Southend Rock Sonet SNTF-806, Compilation of various "Southend" artists, Jupp has two tracks, "The Ballad of Guitar Pickin' Slim" (a.k.a. "Down in Old New Orleans") and "Down to the Doctor's" (UK)

1981

- Lined Again Line LLP-5123-AS, Compilation of Line Records artists with "Poison Girls" (Germany)

1982

- Disco Hit De L'Été Epic EPC-85833, Compilation album with "Some People Can't Dance" (Netherlands)

1983

- With A Little Help From My Friends (Onkel Pös Carnegie Hall) RCA NL-28531, Promo only compilation given to concert goers, with "Short List" (Germany)

1984

- Live in London Volume 1 Ace Records CH-91, Compilation album with "Kansas City" and "Down at the Doctor's" Recorded live 15 Jan 1983 at the Dublin Castle, London. (UK)
- The Great Lost Singles Album Line LILP-6.25774-AP, Compilation album with "Joggin'" (Germany)

1985

- Highlights CD 9 – Meisterwerke Aus Pop Und Rock Stereoplay 697-006, Compilation album with "Pilot" (Germany)

1986

- Der Sampler 3 Line LILP-4.00203-E, Compilation album with "Chevrolet" (Germany)
- Der Sampler 4 Line LILP-4.00204-E, Compilation album with "Old Rock 'n' Roller" (Germany)
- Der Sampler 5 Line LILP-4.00205-E, Compilation album with "Poison Girls" (Germany)
- Der Sampler 8 Line LILP-4.00208-E, Compilation album with "Modern Music" (Germany)
- Der Sampler 16 Line LILP-4.00216-E, Compilation album with "Cheque Book" (Germany)
- Der Sampler 36 Line LICD-9.00806-J, CD only compilation with "Pilot" (Germany)
- Slow Dancing: Line's Greatest Dance Songs Viva/Line VVCD-9.01111-L, CD only compilation with "Pilot" (Germany)

1987

- Another Christmas Gift From Line Line LICD-9.00500-G, Christmas compilation album with "Short List" (Germany)
- Good Times-Vol. 3: 150 Minutes of Great Rock & Pop 1961-1990 Line LICD-9.00500-G, 2-CD Set with "Old Rock 'N' Roller" (Germany)

1988

- The Southend Collection Waterfront WF-045, Compilation album with "The Road" and "Down at the Doctor's" (UK)

1991

- Line Music Presents Xmas Excursions Line LICD-9.01135-E, Christmas compilation album with "Crazy Cowboy Christmas" (Germany)
- Pop Patterns: Line's Greatest Popsters Viva/Line VVCD-9.01156-L, Compilation album with "Joggin'" (Germany)
- Line 4 Line LICD-9.00844, Compilation album with "No Place Like Home" (Germany)

1992

- The Stiff Records Box Set Demon/Stiff BOX-1 (UK), Rhino/Stiff R2-71062 (US), 4CD Stiff Records compilation with "You'll Never Get Me Up in One of Those"
- Liner: New Tracks 1 Line LICD-9.01220-E, Compilation album with "No Place Like Home" (Germany)
- Rhythm & Blues Express Toll House Records Toll-002, CD compilation album with "Standing at the Crossroads Again" (UK)

1993

- Cadillac 'N' Roll Polyphone 845-489-2, CD compilation album with "Chevrolet" (Germany)

1994

- Good Times-Vol. 3: 150 Minutes of Great Rock & Pop 1961-1990 Repertoire Records REP-4497-WG, 2-CD Set with "Old Rock 'N' Roller" (Germany)
- Pop & Rock! Infogram 21, CD compilation with "Anything You Say" (Sweden)

1996

Southend Rock 2 The Lunch Label 01702-001, CD compilation with "Standing at the Crossroads Again" (UK)

1999

Some Sides of Line: 20th Anniversary Line LMS-9.01356, CD compilation with "Poison Girls" (Germany)

The Greatest Pop Ballads Repertoire Records RR-4763, 2CD compilation with "Pilot" (Germany)

2001

- Brit Rock: Back on Track Pool Sounds POLL-CD026, CD compilation with "Brother Doctor, Sister Nurse" (Reissued in 2008 on Darrow as 'Brit Rockin' Tracks!') (Sweden)

2007

- The Big Stiff Box Set Salvo SALVOBX402, 4CD Stiff Records compilation with "Old Rock ' n' Roller" (UK)
- Goodbye Nashville, Hello Camden Town (A Pub Rock Anthology) Castle CMEDD1451, 2CD compilation with "If Only Mother" (UK)

2008

- Feber 3: Mats Olsson Pubrock Bonnier Amigo AMSCD-120, 2-CD set compiled by Swedish journalist with "Cheque Book" and "Making Friends" (Sweden)

2010

- The Mo Witham Band 'Live at the High Cross Inn CD only, Wild Bird Records/mickeyjupp.com, Jupp is credited with guitar, piano & vocals (UK)

2011

- The Mo Witham Band 'Live at the Riga Music Bar CD only, Wild Bird Records/mickeyjupp.com, Jupp is credited with guitar, piano & vocals (UK)
