= Shine On Brightly =

Studio album by Procol Harum
- Released: September 1968 (US); December 1968 (UK)
- Recorded: 1967–68
- Studios: Advision, London; De Lane Lea, London; Olympic, London
- Genres: Progressive rock, art rock, psychedelic rock
- Length: 39:09
- Labels: Regal Zonophone, A&M
- Producer: Denny Cordell

Procol Harum chronology
Procol Harum (1967)	Shine On Brightly (1968)	A Salty Dog (1969)

Alternative cover
- US and European cover

Shine On Brightly is the second studio album by English rock band Procol Harum, released in 1968 by record labels Regal Zonophone and A&M.

It is considered an early example of progressive rock.

The album's single, "Quite Rightly So", failed to repeat the success of Procol Harum's first two singles ("A Whiter Shade of Pale" and "Homburg"), but the album itself was a commercial success in the United States, outperforming their first album, though it failed to chart in their home country. In Canada, the album reached #26.

== Background and recording ==
Shine on Brightly is credited as produced solely by Denny Cordell, but in fact he and Procol Harum had a parting of ways roughly halfway through recording it. Among the grievances between them was Cordell's trying to get drummer B. J. Wilson to leave Procol Harum and join Joe Cocker's backing band. Most of the production work was instead done by Tony Visconti, though lyricist Keith Reid credits the album's engineer, Glyn Johns, with an instrumental role in assembling the track "In Held 'Twas in I". This track was written and recorded in a very piecemeal fashion; for example, the spoken word introduction was recorded before any music had been written for the piece. Reid heard the story told in this introduction from an American writer he met in Baghdad House, a café on Fulham Road. According to Reid, the "Grand Finale" section of the song was written solely by organist Matthew Fisher.

== Cover art ==
While the cover art for the UK release on Regal Zonophone was commissioned by Procol Harum themselves, the cover art for the US release on A&M, depicting a deformed nude figure playing an upright piano in a joshua tree desert through a yellow-green filter, was created without any impetus from the band.

The interior of the record sleeve is a photograph of the band lit only by sparklers they are holding.

== Content ==
The opening song "Quite Rightly So" is about lost love; the lyric was written by Keith Reid after a broken love affair in the United States.

"Rambling On" tells the story of a young man trying to emulate Batman by jumping off a roof, and was described by Reid as a "flight of fancy, just me rambling on".

The title of the nearly side-long suite "In Held 'Twas in I" is an acrostic. It is formed by taking the first word of the lyrics in each of the first four movements as well as the first word of the sixth verse in the first movement:

"In the darkness of the night..."	From movement 1, "Glimpses of Nirvana"
"Held close by that which some despise..."	From the sixth verse of movement 1
"′Twas tea-time at the circus..."	From movement 2, "′Twas Teatime at the Circus"
"In the autumn of my madness..."	From movement 3, "In the Autumn of My Madness"
"I know if I'd been wiser..."	From movement 4, "Look to Your Soul"

According to Keith Reid, the title has no meaning beyond this acrostic.

== Release ==
Shine On Brightly was released in September 1968 by record labels Regal Zonophone and A&M. The original British and North American versions of the opening two tracks ("Quite Rightly So" and "Shine On Brightly") are different versions.

The album was reissued several times, including a 2009 remaster using the original 2-track stereo masters and featuring bonus B-sides and alternate takes. However, many of the tracks are played at a higher speed. Subsequent reissues have been at the correct speed.

== Reception ==
Professional ratings
Review scores
Source	Rating
AllMusic	4/5 stars
Classic Rock	8/10
MusicHound	3/5
Rolling Stone	(unfavourable)

Upon its release, Jim Miller, writing for Rolling Stone, was unfavourable: "Procol Harum's first release was generally more satisfying, especially since this new album displays little in the way of startling growth – the group has apparently chosen to refine their old approach and the musical result, while usually listenable, is not consistently interesting." Conversely, Billboard opined that the group had "a self contained package, excellently produced" and predicted it could bring them back to chart heights.

In a retrospective review, Bruce Eder wrote in Allmusic that Shine on Brightly "proved that they were more than a one-hit wonder and, released in late 1968, the album extended the definition of progressive rock, even as it kept much of the music rooted in established rock genres." While praising all of the songs, he said that "In Held 'Twas in I" in particular "rivaled anything yet heard from such established progressive rock outfits as The Nice or The Moody Blues in length and surpassed them in audacity".

== Track listing ==
All tracks are written by Gary Brooker and Keith Reid, except as noted.

Side A
No.	Title	Writer(s)	Length
1.	"Quite Rightly So"	Brooker, Fisher, Reid	3:40
2.	"Shine On Brightly"		3:32
3.	"Skip Softly (My Moonbeams)"		3:47
4.	"Wish Me Well"		3:18
5.	"Rambling On"		4:31

Side B
No.	Title	Writer(s)	Length
6.	"Magdalene (My Regal Zonophone)"		2:50
7.	"In Held 'Twas in I": a. "Glimpses of Nirvana" (4:26) b. "'Twas Teatime at the Circus" (1:18) c. "In the Autumn of My Madness" (3:06) d. "Look to Your Soul" (4:55) e. "Grand Finale" (3:46)	Brooker, Fisher, Reid	17:31

Reissue bonus tracks
No.	Title	Writer(s)	Length
1.	"Quite Rightly So" (Mono single version)	Brooker, Fisher, Reid	3:42
2.	"In the Wee Small Hours of Sixpence" (Mono single mix)		3:02
3.	"Monsieur Armand" (Mono)		2:39
4.	"Seem to Have the Blues (Most All the Time)" (Mono)		2:48
5.	"McGreggor"		2:47
6.	"The Gospel According To..."		3:28
7.	"Shine On Brightly" (Early version)		3:23
8.	"Magdalene (My Regal Zonophone)" (Early version)		2:25
9.	"A Robe of Silk" (Backing track)	Brooker	1:59
10.	"Monsieur Armand" (Backing track)	Brooker	2:42
11.	"In the Wee Small Hours of Sixpence" (Backing track)	Brooker	3:00

Some issues of the album, including the original A&M release, do not list the individual movements for "In Held 'Twas in I".

== Personnel ==
Procol Harum

- Gary Brooker – lead vocals (1–7b, 7d), piano (all but 7e)
- Robin Trower – guitar, co-lead vocals (4)
- Matthew Fisher – organ, lead vocals (7c), piano (7e)
- Dave Knights – bass guitar
- B. J. Wilson – drums
- Keith Reid – lyrics

Additional musicians

In addition to the instruments credited to Procol Harum, the album incorporates harpsichord, percussion, and balalaika, all of which were played by uncredited guest musicians. Keith Reid recalled that the percussion on "Wish Me Well" was played by members of Traffic, but did not say which ones.

Technical

- Tony Visconti – assistant producer
- Tom Wilkes – art direction
- George Underwood – front cover art design

== Charts ==
Chart (1968–1969)	Peak position
Canada Top Albums/CDs (RPM)	26
US Billboard 200	24
