= The Hamsters =

British band

Background information
- Origin: Southend-on-Sea, England
- Genres: Blues rock, R&B, Americana, rockabilly
- Years active: 1987–2012
- Members: Snail's-Pace Slim; Rev Otis Elevator; Ms Zsa Zsa Poltergeist
- Website: www.thehamsters.co.uk

The Hamsters were a British band from Southend-on-Sea, Essex, England.

They performed their first live show at the Cliffs Pavilion, Southend-on-Sea, on 1 April 1987, and their last at The Half Moon, Putney on 1 April 2012, exactly 25 years later. They initially played in local pubs with no ambitions to take themselves seriously or to turn professional. As the band ethos was to combine humour with music two members of the original band (and later all three) used light-hearted and parodying pseudonyms as stage names. The original line-up was Snail's-Pace Slim on vocals and guitar, Rev Otis Elevator on drums and Andy Farrell on bass. Andy Billups, aka Ms Zsa Zsa Poltergeist, replaced Farrell on bass in 1988.

The band's name was based on a pseudonym used by the Sex Pistols.

== History ==
Their first performances were in local pubs in and around Southend as a part of the area's well-known R&B scene which had begun in the 1960s; they initially formed for their own amusement and didn't take themselves too seriously. Their bookings quickly started to increase as an increasing number of local music fans requested venues to book them. Eventually it was decided to turn professional and slowly they started getting bookings from venues further afield. During 1988–1990 they released a limited run of four cassette releases of their music until they released their first CD in 1990, titled "Electric Hamsterland" as a parody of the Hendrix "Electric Ladyland" album. There was also a limited run of vinyl LPs of the album.

The group constantly toured throughout UK and occasionally mainland Europe. Described as "Britain's most popular and hardworking pub-rock band", by March 2009, the band claimed to have performed more than 4,000 shows, including supporting Albert Collins and Status Quo. During 2006 and 2007 they joined Wilko Johnson and John Otway to perform The Mad, The Bad & The Dangerous tour. Their track Route 666, from the album of the same name, was played over the end credits of low budget British horror film Stag Night of the Dead.

The Hamsters played their final two gigs on 1 April 2012, at The Half Moon, Putney, exactly 25 years after their first.

== Musical style ==
The Hamsters were called Britain's leading interpreters of the music of Jimi Hendrix and ZZ Top. and so were called a blues rock band, although they were not a tribute band : "they take the music and push it a little further in the direction originally intended". These covers made up only a small part of their playlist, the majority being Americana.

Apart from Slim's guitar virtuosity, the band were known for their instrument swap during ZZ Top's Sharp Dressed Man. The band would start the song in the regular configuration, and in the middle the two guitarists would make their way from the stage into the audience, where they would swap instruments and make their way back to the stage, where Slim would swap with Otis on drums, and would finish the song with Zsa Zsa on lead guitar, Otis on bass, and Slim on drums, all without missing a beat of the song.

== Personnel ==
=== Snail's-Pace Slim ===
The Hamsters' lead singer and guitar player, Snail's-Pace Slim (Barry Martin) has been part of the Southend music scene for many years. He formerly played in various Essex-based bands including Dr Feelgood, the Kursaal Flyers and the Old Pals Act (with bassist Dave Bronze and Robin Trower's brother Brad). He was voted one of the top 100 guitarists of all time in a radio poll on LBC.

Slim also contributes technical articles to guitar magazines, and was featured in the September 1994 edition of Guitar Techniques. Slim was asked by the magazine to contribute a monthly recorded lesson on how to play the blues for inclusion on the CD which accompanied every issue. He was also included in the Guitarist Magazine Book of Guitar Players, published in 1994. In 2007 Slim was interviewed as part of a 3-hour video documentary about the Fender Stratocaster titled Stratmasters, and in August 2008 he was interviewed by Guitarist for their October 2008 issue.

His stage name was selected as a parody of old time blues players such as Lightnin' Slim.

=== Rev Otis Elevator ===
Named after seeing a manufacturer's name plate at the base of an escalator in a local shopping mall, Rev Otis Elevator (Alan Parish) was the drummer of the Hamsters. He was born in Edmonton in 1951 and is largely self-taught as a musician. Before joining the Hamsters, he worked with various Top 40 bands, as well as playing radio and TV jingles. He also provided back-up vocals and plays bass during the traditional Hamsters' finale.

=== Ms Zsa Zsa Poltergeist ===
Ms Zsa Zsa Poltergeist (Andy Billups) was the last bass player. He had replaced original member Andy Farrell in 1988. In 1992 he left the band, after he was diagnosed with focal dystonia, affecting his right hand. He was replaced by Dave Bronze. In 1994, after having re-learned the bass using a custom-designed thumb-pick, he rejoined the band when Bronze left to join Eric Clapton's band.

In 2011, Billups released a solo album Afton Down, in a more "folky" style than The Hamsters material, which does not credit any contributions by Martin or Parish. From 2017 onwards, Billups has been the bass player with the Free tribute band, Tons of Sobs.

His name was based on the name of an incidental character from the BBC radio comedy show Round The Horne.

Billups died on 28 December 2025, at the age of 72.

== Discography ==
Taxi Driver
30 sec sample – 209kb

=== Cassettes ===
- Live at Kent Custom Bike Show (1988)
- Revenge of the Killer Hamsters (1989)
- The Night of the Rocking Rodents (1989)
- Flasher Hamsters From Hell (1990)
- Rodent Rock (1990)
- Condensed Hamsters (1990)

=== Albums ===
- Electric Hamsterland (1990)
- Hamster Jam (1991)
- The Hamsters (1993)
- Route 666 (1995)
- The Jimi Hendrix Memorial Concerts: 1995 (1996)
- Pet Sounds - 10 Years of Rodent Rock (1998)
- Condensed Hamsters (2000)
- They Live By Night (2002)
- Open All Hours (2004)

=== Videos ===
- Burnin Vermin' (1991)
- Band of Gerbils (1996)
- Verminator! (1997)
- Rodents Rock The Reich! (1998)
- To Infirmity, And Beyond! (2004)
- The Mad, The Bad & The Dangerous (2007) with Wilko Johnson and John Otway)
- Curse of the Killer Hamsters! (2008)
