= Jerry Stevenson (musician) =

Jerry Stevenson (born in Kent, England) is an English guitar and mandolin player who has worked with Barbara Dickson, Procol Harum and is currently a member of Be Sharp.

== Career ==
In 1991, Procol Harum re-formed and began recording a new album called The Prodigal Stranger. Bass player Dave Bronze had already been recruited by the band, and when they were looking for an extra guitarist, Bronze recruited Stevenson. At this stage it was known that Robin Trower, a founding member of the band for their first five albums, would be rejoining the band for The Prodigal Stranger, and Stevenson said at procolharum.com that he made sure that he was always 'leaving space for Robin'. Stevenson was mentioned as a session player in the liner notes of The Prodigal Stranger, but there is no audible evidence that his work on that album was ever actually released, nor did he ever tour with the band. After Trower declined to play on The Prodigal Stranger promotional tour, Tim Renwick played guitar on the initial tour dates, soon to be replaced by Geoff Whitehorn who is still with Procol Harum.
