= Matthew Fisher (musician) =

British musician

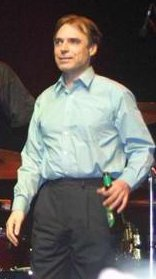
- On stage with Procol Harum in 2001

Background information
- Born: Matthew Charles Fisher; 7 March 1946 (age 80); Addiscombe, Croydon, England
- Genres: Progressive rock; psychedelic rock; blues rock; soft rock
- Occupations: Musician; songwriter; record producer
- Instruments: Keyboards; guitar; vocals
- Years active: 1963–present
- Formerly of: Procol Harum, The Spiders from Mars
- Website: matthewfisher.com

Matthew Charles Fisher (born 7 March 1946) is an English musician, songwriter and record producer. He is best known for his longtime association with the rock band Procol Harum, which included playing the Hammond organ on the 1967 single "A Whiter Shade of Pale", for which he subsequently won a songwriting credit. In his later life, he became a computer programmer, having qualified from Cambridge University.

== Biography ==
=== Early life and career ===
Fisher was born and grew up in Addiscombe, Croydon. He attended Selhurst Grammar School. He started playing in bands in his teens, initially playing bass guitar, but around 1964, after hearing The Animals and Georgie Fame, he decided that he would prefer to be an organist instead. He briefly considered a career as a music teacher. He enrolled for classical training at the Guildhall School of Music, but after a year he dropped out, obtained two Vox Continental organs, and used them on tour with The Gamblers, the backing band to Billy Fury. After The Gamblers, he played with various local groups before joining Peter Jay and the Jaywalkers in 1966.

While on tour with the Jaywalkers, he met Ian McLagan, organist with Small Faces, and became fascinated with the sound of the Hammond M102 organ and Leslie speaker that McLagan used. After borrowing money from his grandmother, he bought the same model of Hammond and started advertising for gigs in the Melody Maker. He quickly discovered that owning a Hammond made him in great demand as a musician, saying "Having a Hammond was like having a licence to print money", and by the end of the year found regular work with Screaming Lord Sutch's backing group The Savages, playing alongside Ritchie Blackmore. Consequently, Gary Brooker and Keith Reid were keen to recruit him for their new group, Procol Harum, and decided to visit him at his Croydon home to discuss the formation of the band.

=== Procol Harum ===
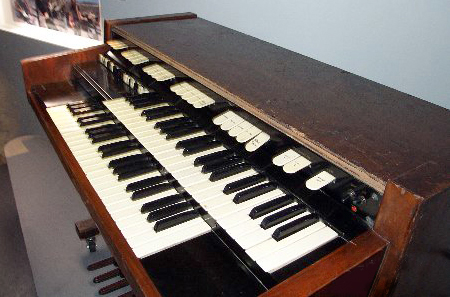
Fisher's use of the Hammond M102 organ was a distinctive part of the early Procol Harum sound.

Fisher joined Procol Harum at the start of 1967 though he kept touring with Sutch for a brief while. While all the band had experience in other groups, Fisher was the only one with formal music training. He recalls that "A Whiter Shade of Pale" was originally four verses and ten minutes long, with solos improvised in between by Fisher and Brooker. When it came to recording the song it was cut to two verses and it was decided that Fisher should do all the solos.

Furthermore, he felt, after seeing the sheet music to "A Whiter Shade of Pale", that he deserved a co-composition credit for coming up with the well-known introduction and solo passages throughout the song. Brooker and Reid, who had composed the basic structure of the song before recruiting Fisher, refused.

While "A Whiter Shade of Pale" was an immediate success, reaching number 1 in the UK charts for several weeks, Fisher doesn't recall the time as being a happy one for the band. Intending to be an underground band they were not accustomed to having a hit single, and he was unimpressed with the band's early gigs.

We were top of the bill with Hendrix billed below us. No way were we one tenth as good as him at the time, and the only reason we didn't get booed off was probably that we were Number 1 that week.

— Matthew Fisher on the early days of Procol Harum

The arrival of guitarist Robin Trower and drummer B.J. Wilson to Procol Harum in mid-1967 seemed to bring some stability to the band. Fisher's first official songwriting credit was for the instrumental "Repent Walpurgis" on the band's debut album, which was transformed by Trower playing a blues-influenced solo over the top of Fisher's classically influenced organ lines. Nevertheless, in response to his lack of co-writing credits (particularly over "A Whiter Shade of Pale"), being at odds with Brooker, Trower and Wilson (who had all grown up together in Southend-on-Sea and previously played in The Paramounts), and still suffering from the death of his father in 1965, Fisher wanted to leave Procol Harum. Despite being talked out of it, he would continue to attempt to leave the band on several occasions over the next two and a half years until finally departing at the end of 1969.

After Trower left in 1971 for a solo career, he briefly rejoined the band, with bandmate Chris Copping moving full-time onto bass. He was unhappy with the financial situation of the band, and with Trower's replacement, Dave Ball, and so he left again, this time acrimoniously, to become a full-time producer for CBS.

==== Authorship lawsuit ====
In 2006, the High Court found Fisher to be joint-author and co-owner of Procol Harum's song "A Whiter Shade of Pale" by virtue of his contribution to the song in the form of his organ solo, despite waiting nearly 40 years since its release to make a claim. Fisher won the case on 20 December 2006 but was awarded 40% of the composers' share of the music copyright, rather than the 50% he was seeking and was not granted royalties prior to 2005.

In 2008, the Court of Appeal agreed Fisher was the song's co-author, but said he should receive no money from past or future royalties because he waited too long to make his claim, but in 2009, judges in the House of Lords reinstated the High Court decision, saying there was no time limit on copyright claims in English law.

=== Production ===
In addition to his work with Procol Harum, he was producer to Robin Trower, James Dewar and Tir Na Nog (among others); and enjoyed a solo career, being especially popular in Greece, where his 1980 song "Why'd I Have to Fall in Love with You" is considered a classic. His solo albums include Journey's End (1973), I'll Be There (1974), Matthew Fisher (1980), Strange Days (1981) and A Salty Dog Returns (1990).

Two of the albums he produced for Trower, Bridge of Sighs (1974) and For Earth Below (1975), have been certified gold by the RIAA, – with Bridge going platinum two times eventually – whilst "A Whiter Shade of Pale" has enjoyed multi-platinum status. Fisher's Hammond organ playing on pianist David Lanz's instrumental version of "A Whiter Shade of Pale" from his 1988 CD, Cristofori's Dream, helped that album go gold as well. The year before, Fisher produced (for Primitive Records) and performed on the 12" single "All Washed Up" by Northampton Band 'Magnolia Siege' (singer Richard Jones or Rik Ramjet), playing honky-tonk piano on the B-side end of record reprise.

Fisher co-wrote and performed on the soundtrack of the 1968 avant-garde film, Separation, which was released on DVD in the UK in July 2009 and in the US in March 2010. Fisher's instrumental "Theme From Separation" on his album Journey's End is from that film, and the soundtrack also included an alternate arrangement of the piece for Hammond, bass and harpsichord.

Fisher co-produced an album by the group Prairie Madness in 1972, on which he also played organ and harpsichord. This was a piano-guitar duo with an accompanying band, but it achieved limited success. He has also played keyboards for Screaming Lord Sutch on his 1972 album, Hands of Jack the Ripper and played piano on David Bowie's tour in June and July 1972, with The Spiders from Mars. Fisher also appeared on the Roderick Falconer Album "New Nation" (1976) which he produced and arranged as well as playing keyboards.

=== Later career ===
Fisher quit Procol Harum in 1969 after the release of their third album, A Salty Dog, which he also produced. He rejoined the band in 1991 for the album The Prodigal Stranger and released two more albums with them, One More Time – Live in Utrecht 1992 and The Well's on Fire. In addition he appeared on two concert DVDs, Live in Copenhagen and Live at the Union Chapel, but quit the band again in 2004.

Having studied computer programming at Wolfson College, Cambridge and graduating in 1995, Fisher became a full-time computer programmer, writing databases.

== Solo discography ==
- Journey's End (1973)
- I'll Be There (1974)
- Matthew Fisher (1980)
- Strange Days (1981)
- A Salty Dog Returns (1990)
