= The Parkerilla =

Live album by Graham Parker and the Rumour
- Released: May 1978
- Recorded: Winter Gardens, Bournemouth; Manchester Opera House; Apollo Theatre, Oxford; The Palladium, NYC
- Genre: Pub rock, rhythm & blues
- Length: 53:18
- Label: Mercury
- Producer: Mutt Lange

Graham Parker and the Rumour chronology
Stick To Me (1977)	The Parkerilla (1978)	Squeezing Out Sparks (1979)

Professional ratings
Review scores
Source	Rating
AllMusic	3/5 stars
Christgau's Record Guide	B−
Rolling Stone	(unfavorable)

The Parkerilla is a 1978 live double album by Graham Parker and the Rumour. It was recorded at Winter Gardens, Bournemouth, Manchester Opera House, Apollo Theatre, Oxford and The Palladium, New York City; and mixed at Rockfield Studios, Wales.

The album was recorded as a contractual obligation album as Parker had already signed with Arista and was preparing "Squeezing Out Sparks" for that label. The album was longer than a traditional record and Mercury elected to release it as a double album. The single "Hey Lord Don't Ask Me Questions" was a re-recording of a song from the first album (and slightly retitled) with the song occupying the fourth side.

The album met with a mixed reception from critics who were waiting for new material from Parker.

In 1991, Rolling Stone ranked The Parkerilla number 64 on its list of 100 greatest album covers. The cover photography was by Brian Griffin, with the artwork completed by Barney Bubbles.

== Track listing ==
All tracks composed by Graham Parker; except where indicated

1. "Lady Doctor" 2:48
2. "Fool's Gold" 4:23
3. "Tear Your Playhouse Down" (Earl Randle) 3:50
4. "Don't Ask Me Questions" 5:00
5. "The Heat in Harlem" 7:35
6. "Silly Thing" 3:15
7. "Gypsy Blood" 5:15
8. "Back to Schooldays" 2:40
9. "Heat Treatment" 3:06
10. "Watch the Moon Come Down" 5:15
11. "New York Shuffle" 2:57
12. "Soul Shoes" 3:23
13. "Hey Lord, Don't Ask Me Questions" (new studio recording) 3:51

== Charts ==
Chart (1978)	Peak position
Australia (Kent Music Report)	22
United Kingdom (Official Charts Company)	14
United States (Billboard 200)	144

== Personnel ==
- Graham Parker – vocals, guitar
- Brinsley Schwarz – guitar, slide guitar, backing vocals
- Bob Andrews – organ, piano, keyboards, backing vocals, musical director, horn arrangements
- Martin Belmont – guitar, backing vocals
- Andrew Bodnar – bass guitar
- Steve Goulding – drums, backing vocals

The Rumour Brass

- Ray Beavis – tenor saxophone
- John Earle – tenor and baritone saxophone
- Chris Gower – trombone
- Dick Hanson – trumpet, flugelhorn
