= Stick to Me =

Studio album by Graham Parker and the Rumour
- Released: October 1977
- Recorded: Eden, London
- Genre: Rock
- Length: 36:44
- Label: Vertigo, Mercury
- Producer: Nick Lowe

Graham Parker chronology
| Heat Treatment (1977) | Stick to Me (1977) | The Parkerilla (1978) |

Stick to Me is the third studio album by English singer-songwriter Graham Parker and the Rumour, released in 1977.

== Background ==
Parker, interviewed by Steve Hammer, recalled the making of the album:

...for Stick to Me, we had an 80-piece string section playing. But the whole album had to be scrapped because the master tape was leaking oxide or something. The producer, again, didn't seem to spot it. We saw this black stuff coming off the tapes but he didn't notice it. When we came to mix it, it was un-mixable. The hi-hat was leaking through all the tracks. It was a nightmare, because we had a tour coming up. In those days I had a manager, and managers are always saying, "We have to play in Sweden now," like that's the most important thing to do. So we re-made the record in a week with Nick Lowe. It's not what I wanted at all. It's a very intense, grungy-sounding record, but I kind of like it now for that reason. I think people are trying to get that sound now, and have been since the late '80s, when we finally got rid of that Phil Collins drum sound and got real again. If a band made a record like that now, it would be hailed as a great low-fi record. But in those days, of course, the American press panned it. They thought I should sound like Boston or Journey or something. They thought I should have a slicker sound. But they had a point.

== Critical reception ==
Professional ratings
Review scores
| Source | Rating |
|---|---|
| AllMusic | 4.5/5 stars |
| Christgau's Record Guide | A− |
| The Encyclopedia of Popular Music | 3/5 stars |
| Q | 4/5 stars |
| The Rolling Stone Album Guide | 3/5 stars |
| Spin Alternative Record Guide | 8/10 |
| Uncut | 3.5/5 stars |

Rolling Stone critic Dave Marsh found that Stick to Me lacks highlights on the level of the best songs from Parker's previous releases and criticized its production, which he said "obscures the songs' drive and power, making murky some of the most lucid music around."

Critical opinion of Stick to Me generally ranks it below their first two albums, Howlin' Wind and Heat Treatment. An undeniable shortcoming is the sound: the sessions suffered from a production mishap. The original recording was ruined, and all the songs needed to be rerecorded hastily. This accounts for the absence of bonus tracks on reissues – there weren't any leftovers.

== Track listing ==
All songs written by Graham Parker except as indicated.

1. "Stick to Me" – 3:29
2. "I'm Gonna Tear Your Playhouse Down" (Earl Randle) – 3:26
3. "Problem Child" – 3:25
4. "Soul on Ice" – 3:01
5. "Clear Head" – 2:58
6. "The New York Shuffle" – 2:58
7. "Watch the Moon Come Down" – 4:49
8. "Thunder and Rain" – 3:15
9. "The Heat in Harlem" – 7:00
10. "The Raid" – 2:39

== Personnel ==
- Graham Parker – vocals, guitar
- Brinsley Schwarz – guitar
- Bob Andrews – organ, piano, keyboards, backing vocals
- Martin Belmont – guitar, backing vocals
- Andrew Bodnar – bass guitar
- Steve Goulding – drums, backing vocals

Additional personnel

- John Altman – saxophone
- Ray Beavis – saxophone
- David Bedford – arrangements
- John Earle – saxophone
- Chris Gower – trombone
- Dick Hanson – trumpet
- Darryl Leeque – percussion

== Charts ==
| Chart (1977–78) | Peak position |
|---|---|
| Australian Albums (Kent Music Report) | 35 |
| New Zealand Albums (RMNZ) | 17 |
| Swedish Albums (Sverigetopplistan) | 29 |
| UK Albums (OCC) | 19 |
| US Billboard 200 | 125 |
