= Heat Treatment =

Studio album by Graham Parker
- Released: October 1976
- Recorded: Rockfield Studios, Wales
- Genre: Rock
- Length: 35:41
- Label: Vertigo, Mercury
- Producer: Robert John "Mutt" Lange, Nick Lowe (track 7 only)

Graham Parker chronology
Howlin' Wind (1976)	Heat Treatment (1976)	Stick to Me (1977)

Heat Treatment is the second album by English singer-songwriter Graham Parker and his band the Rumour, released in October 1976. A close follow-up to Parker's debut album Howlin' Wind, Heat Treatment was well received by critics and contains signature Parker songs like the rollicking title track, "Pourin' It All Out", and "Fool's Gold". "That's What They All Say" is a Dylan-esque putdown from a realist perspective, while "Turned Up Too Late" was perhaps Parker's most emotionally mature composition to date. "Black Honey" is a dark, downcast sequel to the debut's upbeat first track "White Honey". "Hotel Chambermaid" was covered many years later by Rod Stewart. The Rumour was credited on the back cover and the label, but not on the album's front cover.

In 2001, Vertigo/Mercury issued a remastered and expanded CD, including two tracks from The Pink Parker EP.

== Critical reception ==
Professional ratings
Review scores
Source	Rating
AllMusic	4.5/5 stars
Christgau's Record Guide	A
The Encyclopedia of Popular Music	4/5 stars
(The New) Rolling Stone Album Guide	4/5 stars
Spin Alternative Record Guide	8/10

Rolling Stone's Simon Frith wrote that Heat Treatment "confirms the promise" of Howlin' Wind and showcases Parker and his band performing with a "sheer attack" that makes Howlin' Wind "sound suddenly subdued". Heat Treatment finished second in The Village Voice's 1976 Pazz & Jop critics' poll of the year's best albums, with Howlin' Wind placing fourth.

In recent years, Parker on his website has singled out the album as one of his least favorite of his own works, citing his inexperienced vocal technique, his rushed songwriting, and the stiff production by Robert John "Mutt" Lange.

== Track listing ==
All songs written by Graham Parker except as indicated.

1. "Heat Treatment" – 3:07
2. "That's What They All Say" – 3:46
3. "Turned Up Too Late" – 3:38
4. "Black Honey" – 3:57
5. "Hotel Chambermaid" – 2:55
6. "Pourin' It All Out" – 3:15
7. "Back Door Love" – 3:01
8. "Something You're Going Through" – 4:10
9. "Help Me Shake It" – 3:37
10. "Fools' Gold" – 4:15

2001 Bonus Tracks (from Pink Parker EP)

1. "Hold Back the Night" (Dennis Harris, Allan Felder, Ronald Baker, Earl Young) – 3:01
2. "(Let Me Get) Sweet on You" – 2:44

== Personnel ==
- Graham Parker – vocals, acoustic guitar, electric guitar
- Bob Andrews – keyboards, backing vocals
- Brinsley Schwarz – guitar, backing vocals
- Steve Goulding – drums, backing vocals
- Andrew Bodnar – Fender bass
- Martin Belmont – guitar, backing vocals

=== Additional personnel ===
- John "Viscount" Earle – saxophones
- Danny Ellis – trombone
- Albie Donnelly – saxophones
- Dick Hanson – trumpet

== Charts ==
Album

Year	Chart	Position
1977	Billboard Pop Albums	169

Single

Year	Song	Chart	Position
1977	"Hold Back the Night"	Billboard Pop Singles	58
