= Jesus of Cool =

Studio album by Nick Lowe
- Released: March 1978
- Recorded: 1976–77
- Studios: Chalk Farm Studios, London; Eden Studios, Chiswick; Jackson Studios, Rickmansworth; Pathway Studios, Stoke Newington
- Genres: New wave; pop
- Length: 33:17
- Label: Radar
- Producer: Nick Lowe

Nick Lowe chronology
Jesus of Cool (1978)	Labour of Lust (1979)

Back cover
- From the original Radar Records release

Jesus of Cool is the solo debut album by British singer-songwriter Nick Lowe. Produced by Lowe, it was released in March 1978 by Radar Records in the UK.

In the United States, the album was reconfigured by Columbia Records and retitled Pure Pop for Now People, a slogan that had appeared on the original UK album cover, with Columbia opting for a different track listing: "Shake and Pop" was replaced with "They Called It Rock," a slightly different version of the song by Lowe's other band Rockpile, which had been included as a single-sided bonus 45 in the original UK album; the live version of "Heart of the City" was replaced with a studio version that had been released as the b-side of Lowe's "So It Goes" single on Stiff Records; and "Rollers Show," a song originally released by Lowe in 1977 as a United Artists novelty single under the name Tartan Horde (a follow-up to their single "Bay City Rollers We Love You"), was added. The songs are also in a different order than the UK version.

Jesus of Cool has been highly acclaimed by critics. In February 2008, it was reissued in an expanded, deluxe edition by Proper Records in the UK and Yep Roc Records in the US. On 23 April 2022, for Record Store Day, the album was rereleased again under the name Wireless World, combining the track lists of Jesus of Cool and Pure Pop for Now People into one album.

Two verses of the song "So It Goes" were featured in the 1979 film Rock 'n' Roll High School.

== Themes ==
Jesus of Cool has a number of tracks attacking the commercialism and greed of the music industry and the shallow content of pop music: "Music for Money," the fraternal twin songs "Shake and Pop" and "They Called It Rock," and "Rollers Show," the last being a parody of the teen audience of the Bay City Rollers. Although musically sophisticated in conventional genres, the album shares the energy, cynicism and rebelliousness of the contemporary new wave movement.

== Album cover ==
The original vinyl album cover features six pictures of Nick Lowe, with the UK, US and Scandinavian versions featuring a slightly different selection of photos. On both covers, the phrase "PURE POP FOR NOW PEOPLE" is spelled out in small letters across the photos. "PURE" was small yellow print in the top left photo, "POP" was small red print in the top middle, "FOR" was small blue print in the top right, "NOW" was small blue print bottom left, "PEO" was small yellow print in the bottom middle and "PLE" was small red print in the bottom right.

The UK version had a photo of three kitsch glass swan ornaments on the back sleeve. The US version replaced this with a picture of Lowe dressed up in a green Riddler suit made by Antoinette Laumer Sales. The design of the inner sleeve also differs between the UK and US versions.

The UK, US and Scandinavian sleeves were designed by Barney Bubbles.

== Critical reception ==
Professional ratings
Review scores
Source	Rating
AllMusic	5/5 stars
American Songwriter	4/5 stars
Christgau's Record Guide	A
Entertainment Weekly	A
Mojo	4/5 stars
Pitchfork	9.3/10
Rolling Stone	4/5 stars
Spin	4/5 stars
Spin Alternative Record Guide	9/10
Uncut	5/5 stars

Reviewing the American release in 1978, Village Voice critic Robert Christgau called it "an amazing pop tour-de-force demonstrating that if the music is cute enough the words can be any old non-cliché". The characters in Lowe's songs, he observed, "cut off their right arms, castrate Castro, love the sound of breaking glass, roam with alligators in the heart of the city, and go to see the Bay City Rollers. But because the hooks cascade so deftly from sources as diverse as the Beach Boys and the Boomtown Rats, I care about every one of them."

Peter Silverton of Sounds said at the time of release, "Despite the track to track differences in sound, they're all so very Lowe – sparse, carefully selected instrumentation, delicacy of touch and understated vocals. But when he turns in masterpieces like 'Marie Provost' – certainly the best, most fully formed lyrics he's ever written – you forget the partial failures."

Nick Kent, writing in NME, noted that fans of Lowe would be "more than a little pissed off" by the inclusion of five songs that had previously been released in different formats, but also said, "if you're not already familiar with these titles then you at least have nothing to complain about, seeing that they're almost uniformly superb."

== Track listing ==
All songs written by Nick Lowe, except where otherwise noted.

=== Jesus of Cool ===
Side one
No.	Title	Writer(s)	Length
1.	"Music for Money"		2:03
2.	"I Love the Sound of Breaking Glass"	Lowe, Andrew Bodnar, Steve Goulding	3:05
3.	"Little Hitler"	Lowe, Dave Edmunds	2:51
4.	"Shake and Pop"		3:13
5.	"Tonight"		3:45

Side two
No.	Title	Writer(s)	Length
1.	"So It Goes"		2:23
2.	"No Reason"		3:25
3.	"36 Inches High"	Jim Ford	2:50
4.	"Marie Provost"		2:41
5.	"Nutted by Reality"		2:46
6.	"Heart of the City (Live)"		2:14

Bonus 7" single
No.	Title	Writer(s)	Length
1.	"They Called It Rock"	Lowe, Rockpile, Edmunds	3:10

- "They Called It Rock" was a single-sided, non-album 45, credited to the band Rockpile.
- "Rollers Show" and "They Called It Rock," both of which were included on the US issue of Pure Pop for Now People, were added as bonus tracks to the first UK CD release of this album in 1989.

=== Pure Pop for Now People ===
Side one
No.	Title	Writer(s)	Length
1.	"So It Goes"		2:23
2.	"I Love the Sound of Breaking Glass"	Lowe, Andrew Bodnar, Steve Goulding	3:05
3.	"Tonight"		3:45
4.	"Marie Provost"		2:41
5.	"Heart of the City"		2:01
6.	"Rollers Show"		3:31

Side two
No.	Title	Writer(s)	Length
1.	"They Called It Rock"		3:10
2.	"No Reason"		3:25
3.	"Little Hitler"	Lowe, Dave Edmunds	2:51
4.	"Nutted by Reality"		2:46
5.	"36 Inches High"	Jim Ford	2:50
6.	"Music for Money"		2:09

- "Heart of the City" is the studio version.

=== Jesus of Cool (2008 deluxe edition) ===
Side one
No.	Title	Writer(s)	Length
1.	"Music for Money"		2:03
2.	"I Love the Sound of Breaking Glass"	Lowe, Andrew Bodnar, Steve Goulding	3:05
3.	"Little Hitler"	Lowe, Dave Edmunds	2:51
4.	"Shake and Pop"		3:13
5.	"Tonight"		3:45
6.	"So It Goes"		2:23
7.	"No Reason"		3:25
8.	"36 Inches High"	Jim Ford	2:50
9.	"Marie Provost"		2:41
10.	"Nutted by Reality"		2:46
11.	"Heart of the City" (Live)		2:14

And more:
No.	Title	Writer(s)	Length
12.	"Shake That Rat"		2:12
13.	"I Love My Label"	Lowe, Profile	3:00
14.	"They Called It Rock"	Lowe, Rockpile, Edmunds	3:13
15.	"Born a Woman"	Martha Sharp	3:27
16.	"Endless Sleep"		4:08
17.	"Halfway to Paradise"	Gerry Goffin, Carole King	2:26
18.	"Rollers Show"		3:32
19.	"Cruel to Be Kind" (Original Version)	Lowe, Ian Gomm	2:52
20.	"Heart of the City"		2:07
21.	"I Don't Want the Night to End"		1:57

- "Cruel to Be Kind" is the original version by Brinsley Schwarz, recorded for their unreleased album It's All Over Now and first released as the B-side to Lowe's "Little Hitler" single in 1978.

=== Wireless World (2022 Record Store Day release) ===
Side one
No.	Title	Writer(s)	Length
1.	"Music for Money"		2:03
2.	"I Love the Sound of Breaking Glass"	Lowe, Andrew Bodnar, Steve Goulding	3:05
3.	"Little Hitler"	Lowe, Dave Edmunds	2:51
4.	"Shake and Pop"		3:13
5.	"Tonight"		3:45
6.	"So It Goes"		2:23
7.	"No Reason"		3:25

Side two
No.	Title	Writer(s)	Length
1.	"36 Inches High"	Jim Ford	2:50
2.	"Marie Provost"		2:41
3.	"Nutted by Reality"		2:46
4.	"Heart of the City" (Live)		2:14
5.	"They Called It Rock"		3:13
6.	"Rollers Show"		3:32
7.	"Heart of the City" (Studio Version)		2:07

== Personnel ==
Upon the album's initial release, the cover artwork deliberately omitted any mention of the musicians involved.

- Nick Lowe – vocals, bass, guitars, piano
- Billy Bremner – guitars
- Dave Edmunds – guitars, vocals
- John Turnbull – lead guitar on "Nutted by Reality"
- John McFee – guitar solo on "Tonight"
- Martin Belmont – guitar
- Andrew Bodnar – bass
- Norman Watt-Roy – bass on "Nutted by Reality"
- Terry Williams – drums
- Steve Goulding – drums
- Pete Thomas – drums
- Charley Charles – drums on "Nutted by Reality"
- Bob Andrews – piano, organ
- Steve Nieve – piano on "Nutted by Reality"
- Roger Béchirian – tambourine and backing vocals on "I Love The Sound of Breaking Glass", organ on "Marie Provost"

== Charts ==
Chart (1978)	Position
Australia (Kent Music Report)	77
The Netherlands	26
Sweden	31
United Kingdom (Official Charts Company)	22
US Billboard 200	127

== See also ==
- Marie Prevost
