= So It Goes (song) =

Single by Nick Lowe

from the album Jesus of Cool
- B-side: "Heart of the City"
- Released: 14 August 1976
- Genre: Power pop; new wave; proto-punk
- Length: 2:34
- Label: Stiff
- Songwriter: Nick Lowe
- Producers: Nick Lowe; Jake Riviera

Nick Lowe singles chronology
"So It Goes" (1976)	"Keep It Out of Sight" (1977)

"So It Goes" is a song written and recorded by Nick Lowe in 1976. The single was Nick Lowe’s solo debut following his departure from Brinsley Schwarz, and was the first single released on Stiff Records.

== Background ==
Following the demise of the band Brinsley Schwarz, Lowe had formed the ad hoc band Spick Ace & the Blue Sharks with Martin Stone of The Pink Fairies and members of Dr. Feelgood. Contractual difficulties prevented their recordings from being released, and despite manager Jake Riviera's efforts, record companies were not interested in signing Lowe as a solo artist.

In the summer of 1976, Riviera borrowed £400 from Dr. Feelgood's Lee Brilleaux and rock photographer Keith Morris and along with former Brinsley Schwarz manager Dave Robinson formed Stiff Records. Stiff gave Lowe £45 to record two songs and accompanied only by drummer Steve Goulding of The Rumour recorded "So It Goes" and the B-side, “Heart of the City”. The single was released on 14 August 1976 with the catalogue number Stiff BUY1. The single was marketed through specialist shops and by mail order. Although it failed to chart, it more than recouped its investment and helped kick-start a new generation of DIY independent labels.

The record has the following messages in the run out grooves: "Earthlings Awake" and "Three Chord Trick Yeh".

The song was written while Lowe was tour-managing Graham Parker & The Rumour who were opening for Thin Lizzy. He said, "I remember "The Boys Are Back in Town" playing all the time on that tour. It had this little descending thing that just got under my skin and I started singing 'and so it goes, so it goes, so it goes' while I was walking around doing my tour manager duties. The song isn't really about much. It's a bunch of interesting words strung together."

== Reception ==
The single was voted the fifth-best single of the year according to the New Musical Express critics poll. James Honeyman-Scott of the Pretenders cited the song, alongside Elvis Costello's "(The Angels Wanna Wear My) Red Shoes", as one of the inspirations for his jangly guitar sound. He explained, "They had this big, jangly guitar sound, which is what I'd been wanting to get into for a long while. All of a sudden the radio's on and there's this huge guitar sound coming out, like sending out a big Rickenbacker 12-string or something. And I thought, 'Ah, my time is here.' So that's what happened. And then I hooked up with the Pretenders."

== Personnel ==
- Nick Lowe – vocals, bass, guitar
- Steve Goulding – drums

== Covers ==
Year	Singer/Group	Album	Comments
2002	The Bigger Lovers	The Stiff Generation: If It Ain't Stiff, It Ain't Worth a Tribute	tribute album to Stiff Records
2008	Matt Madly	Checkered	
2008	Shigekazu Aida	So it Goes	
2009	The Brighton Port Authority	I Think We're Gonna Need a Bigger Boat	* featuring Olly Hite
2012	Davey Lane	"Pure Pop @ Pure Pop"	
