= Acid Bubblegum =

Studio album by Graham Parker
- Released: 1 October 1996
- Genre: Rock and roll
- Label: Razor & Tie
- Producer: Graham Parker

Graham Parker chronology
Live from New York, NY (1996)	Acid Bubblegum (1996)	The Last Rock & Roll Tour (1997)

Acid Bubblegum is an album by the English musician Graham Parker, released on 1 October 1996. Its title is a play on the genres of acid rock and acid house. Parker supported it with a North American tour, backed by the Figgs.

== Production ==
Parker wrote the songs on acoustic guitar. "Turn It into Hate" was written a few years before his previous studio album, 12 Haunted Episodes, and set the tone for the rest of Acid Bubblegum's "aggrieved" songs. Parker was backed by Andrew Bodnar on bass, Gary Burke on drums, and Jimmy Destri on keyboards. He produced the album, which was recorded in 13 days. "Obsessed with Aretha" was written after Parker saw Aretha Franklin perform at the Concert for the Rock and Roll Hall of Fame, in 1995; he had long been impressed with her "technically great" voice but found it to be symbolic of a lack of "soulfulness" in society. "They Got It Wrong (As Usual)" alludes to the suicide of Kurt Cobain. "Bubblegum Cancer" criticizes the tobacco industry for marketing cigarettes to minors. "Girl at the End of the Pier" is about the suicide of a young woman.

== Critical reception ==
Professional ratings
Review scores
Source	Rating
All Music Guide to Rock	3/5 stars
Chicago Tribune	3.5/4 stars
The Encyclopedia of Popular Music	3/5 stars
The Great Rock Discography	5/10
The Guardian	4/5 stars
Lincoln Journal Star	5/5 stars
MusicHound Rock: The Essential Album Guide	3/5 stars
(The New) Rolling Stone Album Guide	3/5 stars
Sunday Republican	3/5 stars
The Tampa Tribune	3.5/4 stars

The Record called the album "a soulful rock-and-roll treat that proves the old basher still can summon the spit and vinegar." The New York Times stated that Parker "returns to the stubborn righteousness that has brought him loyal fans for 20 years." Lincoln Journal Star said that he "surrenders completely to his baser impulses, firing caustically and hilariously at all sorts of pop-culture targets" and "the playing is lean and rocking, the melodies some of Parker's best in years". The Observer noted that "while he can still write some potent lyrics, trying to be the most rage-filled rocker around is an odd ambition for a 45 year old."

The Chicago Tribune concluded that "though the verbal hostility sometimes sounds staged, the music truly sizzles." The Los Angeles Times stated, "It's a cranky thinking-person's album, along the lines of Lou Reed's ticked-off-guy-on-a-barstool record, New York." The Washington Post noted that Parker "now distrusts youth culture every bit as much as he has always distrusted the Establishment." The Tampa Tribune called it a "punchy, intelligent and tuneful treat". The Indianapolis Star labeled the album "probably the best unheard disc of 1996."

== Track listing ==
No.	Title	Length
1.	"Turn It into Hate"
2.	"Sharpening Axes"
3.	"Get Over It and Move On"
4.	"Bubblegum Cancer"
5.	"Impenetrable"
6.	"She Never Let Me Down"
7.	"Obsessed with Aretha"
8.	"Beancounter"
9.	"Girl at the End of the Pier"
10.	"Baggage"
11.	"Milk Train"
12.	"Character Assassination"
13.	"They Got It Wrong (As Usual)"
