= Endless Night (Graham Parker song) =

1980 single by Graham Parker

- German single sleeve

Single by Graham Parker

from the album The Up Escalator
- B-side: "Jolie Jolie" (AU); "Mercury Poisoning" (DE)
- Released: September 1980
- Genre: Rock, new wave
- Label: Stiff (UK & Europe); Arista (USA & Canada)
- Songwriter: Graham Parker
- Producers: Jimmy Iovine, Graham Parker

Graham Parker singles chronology
"Love Without Greed" (1980)	"Endless Night" (1980)	"Temporary Beauty" (1982)

"Endless Night" is a song written by rock musician Graham Parker and performed by Graham Parker and the Rumour for their 1980 studio album The Up Escalator. Originally written for the 1980 film Cruising, "Endless Night" features lyrics about aging in rock 'n' roll. The song notably featured backing vocals from musician and Parker fan Bruce Springsteen.

"Endless Night" was released as a single in Germany and Australia. It has since seen praise from critics, who name it a highlight of The Up Escalator.

== Background and lyrics ==
"Endless Night" was one of two songs originally written by Parker for Squeezing Out Sparks producer Jack Nitzsche to use in the soundtrack for the 1980 movie Cruising, alongside "Devil's Sidewalk". Ultimately, legal issues prevented Nitzsche from using the songs and both songs were instead included on The Up Escalator. Parker said, "I kept playing those songs and I kept thinking they were alright you know. So I'm glad I got them back."

Lyrically, "Endless Night" tackles the effects of aging in the rock music industry. Geoffrey Himes of The Washington Post noted that the song "sums up the dilemma of aging rock-'n'-roll radicals" and grapples "with the problem of how to preserve the passion of rock 'n' roll youth in the face of eroding age and corroding society" in lyrics such as "I had the energy but outgrew it/ The identity but saw through it/ I had the walk but got trampled/ Had the taste; it was sampled/ lf only I could find the switch/ That turns on the endless night." Parker later said of aging in rock,

In many ways, as you get older, you lose your edge; meaning those primal drives that acted as a motivator and propellant that were all-consuming to someone between the ages of say, 18 to 24, have all but been burned out by the time one reaches 30, 35, 40, etc. ... In terms of real artistic sharpness, I think it's all downhill by about the age of 30.

== Recording ==
"Endless Night" features a guest appearance from Bruce Springsteen. Springsteen had been a fan of Parker, once naming him the only performer that he would pay to see. Producer Jimmy Iovine invited Springsteen to visit the studio during the recording of The Up Escalator and Iovine suggested that Springsteen contribute backing vocals. On his website, Parker described Springsteen as "courteous and hard working" during the recording. Parker recalled, "Yeah, he just came in once and heard stuff, and he was really enthusiastic. He's a major fan of some of my early stuff and Jimmy [Iovine] just said, 'We should get him for backing vocals,' and I said, 'Fine, yeah, great' and that was it, pretty simple, really." Springsteen also provided vocals on "Paralyzed".

Parker later spoke positively of Springsteen's music, explaining in a 2019 interview, "When I first heard Born to Run I had just got a record deal and I thought those ads might have a point about finding the future of rock. It sounded like the Ronettes with a giant rock'n'roll band, recorded in the underground subways of New York City. I thought it was unbeatable, a stone-cold classic. My music is much gnarlier; not popular like his." Parker has yet to perform with Springsteen live.

== Release and reception ==
"Endless Night" was first released as the first song on the second side of The Up Escalator in May 1980. In the United States, the song was released as the B-side to "No Holding Back", the album's second single. While it was not released in the UK or US, "Endless Night" was released as a single in Germany and Australia, though it did not chart in either country.

Rolling Stone's Debra Rae Cohen said that the song's "sloppiness" and "haphazardness — and the just-singing-along irrelevance of Springsteen's harmonies — give the song a heady vulgarity and spontaneous exuberance that the rest of [The Up Escalator] totally lacks." Himes praised how "lyrics burst out of Parker's throat like the punches of a street fighter" on the track and lauded the performance of the Rumour, writing that the band "propels the song with a kick worthy of the Rolling Stones". Mark Deming of Allmusic named the song as an example of "A-list material" on The Up Escalator and described it as "passionate".
