= Howlin' Wind =

Studio album by Graham Parker and the Rumour
- Released: April 1976
- Studio: Eden Studios, London
- Genre: Pub rock; blue-eyed soul; R&B
- Length: 42:02
- Label: Vertigo, Mercury
- Producer: Nick Lowe

Graham Parker and the Rumour chronology
| Howlin' Wind (1976) | Heat Treatment (1976) |

Howlin' Wind is the debut album by English singer-songwriter Graham Parker and his band the Rumour, released in April 1976. The Rumour were mainly former pub rock musicians, including guitarist Brinsley Schwarz and keyboardist Bob Andrews of the band Brinsley Schwarz; Parker's recent jobs included working as a petrol pump attendant. The music is a blend of rock and roll, R&B, reggae and folk music, behind Parker's searingly intelligent lyrics and passionate vocals. Critics likened Parker's spirit to British punk rock, then in its early stage, and retrospectively to that of singer-songwriters Elvis Costello and Joe Jackson, who would release their debut records within a few years of Howlin' Wind.

Many of the album's songs became live staples for the group, especially the reggae-tinged "Don't Ask Me Questions", which dismisses a malevolent God. "Back to Schooldays" demonstrates why Parker was categorised as "angry young man" by journalists throughout his career: Parker plans retribution against an education system that promised him that "it was like a film out here" when "it's a real horror show, boys". The title track "Howlin' Wind" bracingly announces Graham Parker's career aim: "I'm gonna howl". "Between You and Me" dates from 1975, when Parker, before meeting the Rumour, recorded demo versions of a few of his songs for Dave Robinson, future founder of Stiff Records. These tracks were shopped to labels and played on radio. The album's liner notes explain that "A subsequent recording of the song did not match the feel of the original ... here it is!"

Howlin' Wind was reissued in the United Kingdom in 2001 on Vertigo/Mercury, with one bonus track.

== Critical reception ==
Professional ratings
Review scores
| Source | Rating |
|---|---|
| AllMusic | 5/5 stars |
| Christgau's Record Guide | A |
| The Encyclopedia of Popular Music | 4/5 stars |
| The Rolling Stone Album Guide | 4/5 stars |
| Spin Alternative Record Guide | 9/10 |
| Uncut | 4/5 stars |

Reviewing Howlin' Wind for Rolling Stone, critic Teri Moris praised the Rumour's "raw efficiency" and "the directness of the playing and arranging", while concluding that the album primarily succeeds due to Parker's skills as a songwriter and arranger. Howlin' Wind finished fourth in The Village Voice's 1976 Pazz & Jop critics' poll of the year's best albums, following Parker's later released Heat Treatment in the second spot.

== Track listing ==
All songs written by Graham Parker

1. "White Honey" – 3:33
2. "Nothin's Gonna Pull Us Apart" – 3:21
3. "Silly Thing" – 2:51
4. "Gypsy Blood" – 4:37
5. "Between You and Me" – 2:25
6. "Back to Schooldays" – 2:54
7. "Soul Shoes" – 3:13
8. "Lady Doctor" – 2:50
9. "You've Got to Be Kidding" – 3:30
10. "Howlin' Wind" – 3:58
11. "Not If It Pleases Me" – 3:12
12. "Don't Ask Me Questions" – 5:38

=== Bonus Track (2001 Reissue) ===
1. "I'm Gonna Use It Now" – 3:11

== Personnel ==
- Graham Parker – vocals, acoustic guitar, Fender rhythm guitar

The Rumour

- Brinsley Schwarz – guitar, Hammond organ, backing vocals
- Bob Andrews – Lowrey organ, Hammond organ, piano, backing vocals
- Martin Belmont – guitar, backing vocals
- Steve Goulding – drums, backing vocals
- Andrew Bodnar – Fender bass

Brass

- Stewart Lynas – brass arrangement
- Herschel Holder – trumpet
- Dave Conners – first tenor saxophone
- Brinsley Schwarz – second tenor saxophone
- Danny Ellis – trombone
- John "Viscount" Earle – baritone saxophone

Additional personnel

- Paul Bailey – guitar on 5
- Dave Otway – drums on 5
- Paul Riley – bass guitar on 5
- Noel Brown – slide guitar on 6, dobro on 11
- Dave Edmunds – guitar on 6
- Ed Deane – slide guitar on 7
- Stewart Lynas – alto saxophone on 8
