= Deepcut to Nowhere =

Studio album by Graham Parker
- Released: 2001
- Label: Razor & Tie
- Producer: Graham Parker, Dave Cook

Graham Parker chronology
Loose Monkeys (1999)	Deepcut to Nowhere (2001)	Ultimate Collection (2001)

Deepcut to Nowhere is an album by the English musician Graham Parker, released in 2001. It was his first studio album in five years. The title refers to the village of Parker's youth. Parker supported the album by touring with the Figgs as his backing band.

== Production ==
The album was produced by Parker and Dave Cook; Parker had a harder time writing the songs than he did recording them. Steve Goulding played drums on the album, reuniting with Parker after two decades. "Syphilis & Religion" is about the history of colonialism. "Blue Horizon" reflects on Parker's childhood. "Tough on Clothes" was inspired by Parker's teenage daughter. "I'll Never Play Jacksonville Again" is about a disastrous 1997 club show in Florida. "Socks 'n' Sandals" describes growing older in the suburbs. "Last Stop Is Nowhere" is performed solo by Parker.

== Critical reception ==
Professional ratings
Review scores
Source	Rating
AllMusic	3/5 stars
Chicago Sun-Times	3/4 stars
Edmonton Journal	4/5 stars
The Republican	3/5 stars
(The New) Rolling Stone Album Guide	3/5 stars
Scripps Howard	4/4 stars

The Edmonton Journal called Parker "a little less acidic these days," but noted that "there are still pleasing gulps of venom." Scripps Howard wrote that Parker's "voice, always a gruff instrument that is equal parts Bob Dylan and Costello, has aged exceptionally well." The Hartford Courant opined that the album "finds rock's notoriously angry man still slashing away, but running out of meaningful, thought-provoking targets."

The Philadelphia Inquirer determined that "the bantam Brit's acerbic wit is as cutting as ever ... and he's still rocking hard." The Boston Globe stated that "the songwriting is tight and focused, and where Parker has often seemed to be a cranky skeptic of America's kitsch and capitalism, here he's more interested in matters of the heart." The Herald Sun concluded that Deepcut to Nowhere was Parker's best album since 1988's The Mona Lisa's Sister.

AllMusic wrote that "this is a record that's just for the converted—the ones who will spin the record several times to unlock the meanings of the record, not minding that the songs aren't immediate (or that memorable outside of the lyrics)."

== Track listing ==
No.	Title	Length
1.	"Dark Days"
2.	"I'll Never Play Jacksonville Again"
3.	"If It Ever Stops Rainin'"
4.	"Depend on Me"
5.	"High Horse"
6.	"Cheap Chipped Black Nails"
7.	"Blue Horizon"
8.	"Tough on Clothes"
9.	"Socks 'n' Sandals"
10.	"It Takes a Village Idiot"
11.	"Syphilis & Religion"
12.	"Last Stop Is Nowhere"
