= I Love the Sound of Breaking Glass =

Single by Nick Lowe

from the album Jesus of Cool
- B-side: "They Called It Rock"
- Released: 17 February 1978
- Genre: New wave
- Length: 3:10
- Label: Radar
- Songwriters: Nick Lowe, Andrew Bodnar, Steve Goulding
- Producer: Nick Lowe

Nick Lowe singles chronology
"Halfway to Paradise" (1977)	"I Love the Sound of Breaking Glass" (1978)	"Little Hitler" (1978)

Official audio
- "I Love the Sound of Breaking Glass" on YouTube

"I Love the Sound of Breaking Glass" is a song written by Nick Lowe, Andrew Bodnar, and Steve Goulding and performed by Lowe. It reached number 7 on the UK singles chart in 1978. The song was featured on Lowe's 1978 album, Jesus of Cool.

== Background ==
The song was produced by Lowe. It shared a title with the David Bowie song "Breaking Glass"; Lowe commented, "This sounds so unlike me, but I wasn't aware he had a song called 'Breaking Glass.' ... But Bowie was the guy who had that title first of all. I think the music on my 'Breaking Glass' has something to do with him. I think I pinched something off of him in the music."

Lowe reflected on the song in an interview with The A.V. Club in 2011, stating that it was "a song which was sort of made up in the studio. I had the vague idea of the tune, and that’s why in the writing credits, I cut the bass player and the drummer in on the song, because they made it, really. The drums and bass are really great on that song. Steve Goulding and Andy Bodnar used to play with Graham Parker And The Rumour, whose records I produced, and they played bass and drums on 'I Love The Sound Of Breaking Glass.' Their contribution was so great, I gave them a third each. In fact, I should have actually given Bob Andrews, who played piano on it, a taste of the record. The piano is so great. But that was much later. We’d sort of divided up the songwriting. But there we are."

Lowe told GQ in another interview in 2011 that he did not perform the song live as it could not be effectively performed solo. Even though it was "a fairly big hit in Europe and people ask me for that...I just don't do it. It's a really good record, but there's not actually any song there. It was a half-baked idea I had when I went to the studio, and the bass player and drummer sort of put a little sauce in it. But if I played it with just an acoustic guitar, the audience would probably give me a little clap in recognition, but by verse two, they'd be looking at their fingernails, waiting for the next one. There really isn't anything to it."

When Lowe filmed a performance of "I Love the Sound of Breaking Glass" for Top of the Pops in 1978, he brought his future wife Carlene Carter to the set as part of their first date. Carter recalled, "I went to see him at Top of the Pops. He was doing 'I Love the Sound of Breaking Glass' in his Riddler suit, covered with question marks. We had chemistry."

== Personnel ==
- Nick Lowe – vocals, guitars
- Bob Andrews - piano
- Andrew Bodnar – bass
- Steve Goulding – drums
- Roger Béchirian – tambourine and backing vocals
