= The Up Escalator =

Studio album by Graham Parker
- Released: 23 May 1980
- Genre: Rock
- Label: Stiff (UK); Arista (US)
- Producer: Jimmy Iovine

Graham Parker chronology
Squeezing Out Sparks (1979)	The Up Escalator (1980)	Another Grey Area (1982)

The Up Escalator is an album by Graham Parker and the Rumour, released on 23 May 1980 by Stiff Records as LP (SEEZ 23) and as cassette (ZSEEZ 23). In the USA, the album was released by Arista. Released after Parker's successful 1979 album Squeezing Out Sparks, the album features production by Jimmy Iovine.

Upon its release, the album saw mixed reviews, with many criticizing Iovine's production. Parker separated from the Rumour shortly after the album's release.

== Background ==
The Up Escalator was released as the follow-up to Parker's successful 1979 release, Squeezing Out Sparks. The Rumour's keyboardist, Bob Andrews had left the band after the Squeezing Out Sparks tour, being replaced on The Up Escalator by studio musician Nicky Hopkins, the E-Street Band's Danny Federici, and Peter Wood of Quiver. The album was produced by Jimmy Iovine, who had been a popular producer at the time for his work on Tom Petty and the Heartbreakers' Damn the Torpedoes and Patti Smith's Easter.

Compared to the band's previous album, The Up Escalator was commercially less successful, staying on the charts for less time. Following a few additional concerts and television appearances, Parker and the Rumour split due to musical differences (Parker claimed the band had been "butchering" his songs).

"Stupefaction" was released as a single, backed with the non-album track "Woman in Charge"; the single failed to chart. The track "Endless Night" features backing vocals from American rock musician Bruce Springsteen, who named Parker as the only musician he would pay to see perform.

== Reception ==
Professional ratings
Review scores
Source	Rating
AllMusic	3.5/5 stars
Smash Hits	9/10

The Up Escalator has seen mixed reception from critics, many of whom took issue with Jimmy Iovine's production. Mark Deming of AllMusic said of the pairing of Iovine with Parker, "The idea looked good on paper. ... But one listen to The Up Escalator reveals that Iovine's trademark sound somehow escaped him for this project; the recording and mix are flat and poorly detailed ... and the often mushy audio manages the remarkable feat of making the Rumour, one of the most exciting rock bands of their day, sound just a bit dull." Debra Rae Cohen of Rolling Stone similarly stated, "The new album seems like an attempt to 'gentrify' Parker, to turn him into a commercial classic-by-association by surrounding him with blue-chip artifacts. ... Such an attempt merely devalues Graham Parker's artistry as well as his past achievements. It also drastically undermines his material."

Despite its production, many have praised Parker's songwriting on the album. Deming pointed to "Empty Lives," "The Beating of Another Heart," and "Endless Night" as examples of "A-list material" on the album. Geoffrey Himes of The Washington Post wrote, "The Up Escalator is one long howl for an endless night that will cut through the alienation of the 'Same thing, same way, every day, stupefaction'" and noted that "Parker's music is just as powerful an argument as his lyrics."

== Track listing ==
UK version

All tracks are written by Graham Parker, except where noted.

Side one
No.	Title	Length
1.	"No Holding Back"	3:18
2.	"Devil's Sidewalk"	3:14
3.	"Stupefaction"	3:30
4.	"Love Without Greed"	3:24
5.	"Jolie Jolie"	2:39

Side two
No.	Title	Length
1.	"Endless Night"	3:35
2.	"Paralyzed"	3:13
3.	"Maneuvers"	3:28
4.	"Empty Lives"	5:06
5.	"The Beating of Another Heart"	4:20

US and Australia version

All tracks are written by Graham Parker, except where noted.

Side one
No.	Title	Length
1.	"No Holding Back"	3:18
2.	"Devil's Sidewalk"	3:14
3.	"Stupefaction"	3:30
4.	"Empty Lives"	5:06
5.	"The Beating of Another Heart"	4:20

Side two
No.	Title	Length
1.	"Endless Night"	3:35
2.	"Paralyzed"	3:13
3.	"Maneuvers"	3:28
4.	"Jolie Jolie"	2:39
5.	"Love Without Greed"	3:24

Bonus tracks (2003 reissue)
No.	Title	Length
1.	"Women In Charge"	3:28
2.	"Hey Lord, Don't Ask Me Questions" (Live 1981)	4:49

== Charts ==
Chart (1980)	Peak position
Australia (Kent Music Report)	36
Canada	27
United Kingdom (Official Charts Company)	11
United States (Billboard 200)	40

== Personnel ==
- Graham Parker - guitar, vocals
- Bruce Springsteen - background vocals on "Endless Night"
- Nicky Hopkins - acoustic piano
- Jimmy Maelen - percussion
- Martin Belmont - guitar
- Danny Federici - organ
- Steve Goulding - drums
- Brinsley Schwarz - guitar, background vocals
- Peter Wood - synthesizer
- Andrew Bodnar - bass

== Certifications ==
Canada-Gold

== Sources ==
- The Up Escalator album cover
