= Temporary Beauty =

1982 song by Graham Parker

Single by Graham Parker

from the album Another Grey Area
- B-side: "No More Excuses"
- Released: January 1982
- Genre: Rock, new wave
- Label: RCA (UK & Europe); Arista (USA & Canada)
- Songwriter(s): Graham Parker
- Producer(s): Jack Douglas, Graham Parker

Graham Parker singles chronology
"No Holding Back" (1980)	"Temporary Beauty" (1982)	"You Hit The Spot" (1982)

"Temporary Beauty" is a song by British rock musician Graham Parker. The song was released on his 1982 album, Another Grey Area. With lyrics described by Parker as "put-downs", "Temporary Beauty" is a rock song with vocals that Parker noted as an example of his better singing compared to previous albums.

Released as a single in January 1982, "Temporary Beauty" was a moderate hit in the UK, peaking at number 50. A music video was also made for the song. "Temporary Beauty" has seen positive reception from critics and has been included on multiple compilation albums.

== Lyrics ==
"Temporary Beauty" features lyrics that Geoffrey Himes described in an interview with Parker as "no less angry and no less cutting than those [Parker] did with the Rumour". Parker responded to this description, "Right, they're not, not at all. 'Big Fat Zero', 'Another Grey Area', they're all put-downs".

Himes pointed out what he saw as "a more reflective sense that maybe no one gets everything they want" on Another Grey Area, concluding that "Sometimes you have to make do with 'Temporary Beauty'". To this, Parker responded, "Yeah, that makes sense. I'm a very happy person basically. Yeah, I have a pretty damn good time. People write about me: 'This man is the most morose, miserable S.O.B. in the world', but I ain't. I just express that angry part that everyone else goes through but they can't put into words as well as I can. Everyone feels the same kind of things. I ain't different from anyone else".

== Music ==
"Temporary Beauty" was described by AllMusic's Thom Jurek as a "mid-tempo rocker" with "Springsteen-esque piano". The song features an ondioline performance by famed session musician Nicky Hopkins, who had played on Parker's previous album, The Up Escalator. Like the rest of Another Grey Area, "Temporary Beauty" features glossy production that came under criticism from some reviewers; Parker later said in an interview that the production "suited" the song, although it did not work for all of the songs on the album.

Parker cited "Temporary Beauty" as an example of his improved singing on Another Grey Area, a change he attributed in part to producer Jack Douglas. He explained, "'Temporary Beauty' is a live vocal, the whole thing. I just did three takes and the third one was the take. It's a technique of learning - not studying - to sing. You sing more and more, and instead of singing with your throat, you're singing with your chest".

== Release and reception ==
"Temporary Beauty" was first released as a single in January 1982, backed with "No More Excuses". The single reached number 50 in the UK, became Parker's first charting British single since 1978's "Hey Lord, Don't Ask Me Questions". The single failed to chart elsewhere, despite receiving notable radio play in the US. The single release was accompanied by a music video where Parker lip synced to song in a room with ice sculptures that Parker torched and sawed. When asked about using a chainsaw in the video, Parker said, "As for chainsaws, I'm none too keen on the things, actually". Both "Temporary Beauty" and "No More Excuses" appeared on Another Grea Area in March 1982.

"Temporary Beauty" has seen positive reception from critics since its release. Stephen Thomas Erlewine of AllMusic called the song a "classic" while Jurek said the track "works". The song has also appeared on compilation albums, including Passion Is No Ordinary Word: The Graham Parker Anthology 1976-1991, Master Hits, Ultimate Collection, and the namesake compilation Temporary Beauty. Parker reflected positively on the song in an interview, saying, "Yeah, I'm keen on that song". Parker has also said that he thought Willie Nelson could perform the song well.
