= Burning Questions =

Burning Questions may refer to:

- Burning Questions (James Warren album), 1986
- Burning Questions (Graham Parker album), 1992
- "Burning Questions" (Ugly Betty), an episode of US TV series Ugly Betty

== See also ==
- The Burning Question, a 1943 Danish drama film
