= Stupefaction =

1980 song by Graham Parker

Single by Graham Parker

from the album The Up Escalator
- B-side: "Women In Charge"
- Released: 25 April 1980
- Genre: Rock, new wave
- Label: Stiff (UK & Europe); Arista (USA & Canada)
- Songwriter(s): Graham Parker
- Producer(s): Jimmy Iovine, Graham Parker

Graham Parker singles chronology
"I Want You Back (Alive)" (1979)	"Stupefaction" (1980)	"Love Without Greed" (1980)

"Stupefaction" is a song written by rock musician Graham Parker and performed by Graham Parker and the Rumour for their 1980 studio album The Up Escalator. Inspired by Parker's time spent in Los Angeles, the song features sardonic lyrics that were based on an observation by Parker and his manager in the city.

"Stupefaction" was released as the debut single from The Up Escalator, though it did not chart. It has since seen praise from critics and appeared on multiple compilation albums.

== Background ==
Parker described the song as "good fun, a good re-creation of a Stones song with more humor." The song was inspired by, according to Parker, "spending a lot of time in Los Angeles." He explained of the song's inspiration:

I'd spent time there and I was looking around at people, getting into the lifestyle. ... I remember the most extraordinary thing; me and my tour manager at the time were in a hired car, and my tour manager said to me, "Look at this guy next to us," so I looked and there was this guy driving a car, and his head was tilted back, and he was looking at the ceiling of the car, and it looked like he had broken neck! Everyone comes out of work in L.A., and you're driving along the freeway and you look at them, and they're all there with roach clips, getting stoned as they come out of work hitting the highways! It made me laugh, really, being there.

== Release ==
"Stupefaction" was released in April 1980 as the debut single from The Up Escalator. The B-side of the single was "Women in Charge," a non-album track that was later included as a bonus track on later editions of The Up Escalator. A music video for the song was also released, featuring Parker and the Rumour, including Nicky Hopkins. The single did not chart, though it did garner FM-radio play. The song has also appeared on compilation albums such as Passion Is No Ordinary Word: The Graham Parker Anthology and Master Hits: Graham Parker.

Parker said of the record company's decision to release the song as a single, "'Stupefaction' to me sounded like a poppy, uptempo, 'fun' song that could on the radio. And Jimmy Iovine thought so. He said, 'You know, it's great, this guy's saying 'Stupid, stupid, stupid!″ Just imagine people listening to the radio going, 'Hey, listen to him.' It's like Beavis and Butt-head or something! [does spot-on Butt-Head impersonation]: 'Hey, that guy's saying stupid!' Jimmy had that scenario of what would be going on in the outside world ... the record company thought it was good fun."

== Reception ==
Dave Swanson of Diffuser.fm ranked the song as Parker's eighth best, calling it a "great song" and a "classic" and stating, "[The Up Escalator's] '80s production values often clashed with his style. Not so on this one though, as the pure pop washed with grit here ranks as one of Parker's best." Rock Beat Int'l writer Geoff Cabin described the track as a "bouncy, cheerful pop tune" and praised its "sneeringly funny lyrics." Debra Rae Cohen of Rolling Stone described the song as "deliberately rinky-dink" and noted it as one of the few songs on the album that Hopkins "doesn't deaden with his all-purpose, stylized noodling."

Comedian Adam Carolla praised the song in his book In Fifty Years We'll All Be Chicks, writing of radio during the 1980s, "We could be hearing 'Clubland' by Elvis Costello or 'Stupefaction' by Graham Parker, but instead we get 'The Safety Dance' by Men Without Hats."

The song was covered by the Health & Happiness Show on the Parker tribute album Piss & Vinegar: The Songs of Graham Parker.
