= Stick to Me (song) =

1978 song by Graham Parker

Single by Graham Parker

from the album Stick to Me
- B-side: "The Heat in Harlem"
- Released: February 1978
- Genre: Rock; new wave
- Label: Vertigo
- Songwriter(s): Graham Parker
- Producer(s): Nick Lowe

Graham Parker singles chronology
"The New York Shuffle" (1978)	"Stick to Me" (1978)	"Hey Lord, Don't Ask Me Questions" (1978)

"Stick to Me" is a song by British rock musician Graham Parker, recorded with his backing band the Rumour. The song was released on his 1977 album, Stick to Me. Inspired by "Tickets to Water Falls" by Jack Bruce, the song features a string arrangement that Parker sought to "use with power".

The song was released as a single in some territories in 1978, but did not chart. It has since become a live favorite of Parker's.

== Background ==
Parker said of writing the song, "When I wrote 'Stick to Me' I wrote it in ... bits. I heard strings as soon as I wrote it. I was very keen on doing it, that was my idea". Parker came up with the instrumental break to the song himself, communicating it to arranger David Bedford by humming.

The song's composition was based on "Tickets to Water Falls" by Jack Bruce. Parker explained, "No one would ever know that Jack Bruce's 'Tickets for the Waterfall,' (sic) from his masterwork Songs for a Tailor, is the inspiration for 'Stick To Me' (the song), musically and to a large extent lyrically. People just think it's r and b! Because it had a horn section on it, they thought it was like Southside Johnny or something. Most listeners only see the surface and therefore do not see the 'masterful grasp' of other musical ideas, if not exactly genres".

Of the song's string-laden opening, Parker said, "I've always been into strings. I've always thought they were magic. The Stones have used them great, ELO have used them great. I'd like to see the Sex Pistols use them. They can be used with power. Any instrument, bloody crumhorn. There aren't any rules so I'll break them".

== Release and reception ==
"Stick to Me" was released as a single in New Zealand in 1978, with "The Heat in Harlem" on the B-side. The song was also in contention for single release in the United States; Parker explained in a 1978 interview, "In America I'll just go on what the DJs say they're playing the most. ... 'Stick to Me' is getting played quite a lot". Ultimately, the song was released as the B-side to "The Heat in Harlem" in the US, though "Stick to Me" was also released on a promo single for DJ play. No single release of the song charted.

Parker said of the song in 1978, "'Stick to Me', the song itself, I don't think there's another song like it written anywhere".

== Live history ==
Parker has performed the song live since the tour for Stick to Me, during which the song served as Parker's opener. Parker also performed the song when he reunited the Rumour in the early 2010s. Parker explained of the decision to perform the song, "On one rehearsal, someone mentioned 'Stick To Me' and without any of us studying it we just played it, and to our amazement got it almost right first time, so we threw that in on that particular tour".
