= Struck by Lightning =

Struck by Lightning may refer to:

- Lightning strike
- Struck by Lightning (1990 film)
- Struck by Lightning (2012 film)
- Struck by Lightning (TV series)
- Struck by Lightning (album)
