= Wake Up (Next to You) =

1985 single by Graham Parker and the Shot

Single by Graham Parker and the Shot

from the album Steady Nerves
- B-side: "Canned Laughter" (UK); "Bricks and Mortar" (US)
- Released: April 1985
- Genre: Rock, new wave
- Label: Elektra
- Songwriter: Graham Parker
- Producers: William Wittman, Graham Parker

Graham Parker and the Shot singles chronology
| "Break Them Down" (1985) | "Wake Up (Next to You)" (1985) | "Get Started, Start a Fire" (1988) |

"Wake Up (Next to You)" is a song written by British rock musician Graham Parker and performed by Graham Parker and the Shot. Inspired by Smokey Robinson, the song was crucial in convincing Elektra Records to allow Parker and producer William Wittman to record a full album. The song is also notable for Parker's breathy singing and its lush arrangement.

Released as a single in April 1985, "Wake Up (Next to You)" became Parker's only American Top 40 hit. It has seen positive reception from critics and has been included on multiple compilation albums.

== Background ==
"Wake Up (Next to You)" was one of the first songs Parker recorded with producer William Wittman. Elektra Records had been skeptical of Wittman, so the company initially only funded the recording of four tracks to test the combination; "Wake Up" would ultimately convince Elektra to allow for Parker and Wittman to record a full album.

Parker sought to emulate Smokey Robinson and avoid sounding "slushy" on the song. He explained, "This is everything I wanted to write, nothing about worrying about what Graham Parker is supposed to write about. Smokey Robinson could have written this. My aim is to write something like 'Just My Imagination' or 'Being with You.' That's perfect songwriting. They're love songs, but nothing about them is embarrassing or cringe-inducing."

Parker said of his singing on the track, "That breathy voice - I wrote the song like that. It was in my imagination, and when it came to recording, I could do it, with a bit of tuning up and stuff."

Parker later said that the recording and its production "worked for me." He later contrasted this with the rest of the album, saying "'Wake Up' is one track on Nerves suitable for the production, I think. The rest was like a wall of sludge. Maybe [Wittman and I] should have just done a single."

== Release ==
"Wake Up (Next to You)" was released as a single in April 1985, featuring "Canned Laughter" as the B-side in the UK and "Bricks and Mortar" in the US. The single saw success in the US, reaching number 39 on the Billboard Hot 100 and number 19 on the Mainstream Rock chart. It also reached number 94 in Canada. The single was accompanied by a music video featuring Parker that Elektra spent $97,000 on producing.

"Wake Up (Next to You)" would ultimately be Parker's only Top 40 hit in America. Parker said of this, "Seeing as 'Wake Up' was indeed my only chart stab in the States, I suppose I am a one hit wonder. What a fabulous realization!" When asked about why the song became a hit while others did not, he stated, "It clicked because Elektra spent a hell of a lot of money, that's the only reason [laughs]. Do you want reality, or shall I give you some cock and bull story?"

The song has also appeared on the Parker compilation Passion is No Ordinary Word: The Graham Parker Anthology.

== Reception ==
Frank Spotnitz of the Chicago Tribune described the song as "a soulful but delicate love song" and lauded it as "one of the finest songs [Parker] has written." He went on to call it a highlight of Steady Nerves. Parke Puterbaugh of Rolling Stone praised the song's "intimate, atmospheric balladry" while William Ruhlmann of AllMusic noted it as a prime example of Parker "praising his romantic life" on Steady Nerves. Trouser Press called the song "gorgeously romantic."

John Leland of Spin wrote, "After digging his own grave with his overwrought and unsustainable angry young man image, GP lightens up with some wallpaper AOR soul. It may not be loud, but that backbeat is right there. Those who dismiss this as pap don't realize that it's really cool pap."

== Charts ==
| Chart (1985) | Peak position |
|---|---|
| Canada RPM Top Singles | 94 |
| US Billboard Hot 100 | 39 |
| US Mainstream Rock Airplay (Billboard) | 19 |
