= Steady Nerves =

Studio album by Graham Parker and the Shot
- Released: 1985
- Genre: Rock
- Label: Elektra
- Producers: William Wittman, Graham Parker

Graham Parker and the Shot chronology
The Real Macaw (1983)	Steady Nerves (1985)	The Mona Lisa's Sister (1988)

Singles from Steady Nerves
- 1. "Break Them Down" Released: 1985; 2. "Wake Up (Next to You)" Released: 1985

Steady Nerves is a 1985 album by Graham Parker and the Shot.

The album was produced by William Wittman, who Parker's record company, Elektra, initially opposed. Parker had originally proposed Squeezing Out Sparks producer Jack Nitzsche, but this had been rejected by Elektra. As a result, Elektra only forwarded the funds for four songs to be recorded before the company gave approval for Wittman; ultimately, the rest of the album was recorded and released. Parker recalled,

I mentioned that Wittman, who had somehow or other come across my transom, had just engineered C. Lauper's rather brill She's So Unusual LP. Well, truth be told, Bill W. is quite a forceful little fella and I really had no input in the production at all and just gave up and let him get on with it. He obviously knew what he was doing, and that, to me, is the problem with the record. My weakness and laziness let it happen. I was really hoping for a much more unusual sounding collection but didn't have the brains and moxie to accomplish such a feat.

The album contains his only US Top 40 hit, "Wake Up (Next to You)". Parker said of the song, "That breathy voice - I wrote the song like that. It was in my imagination, and when it came to recording, I could do it, with a bit of tuning up and stuff." Of "The Weekend's Too Short", he said, "'Weekend's Too Short' is definitely a song not written from my point of view. I mean, I don't care about the weekends particularly, do I? I don't work 9 to 5 all week and let loose on Friday night."

== Critical reception ==
Professional ratings
Review scores
Source	Rating
AllMusic	3/5 stars
The Philadelphia Inquirer	4/4 stars

Jack Lloyd of The Philadelphia Inquirer hailed the album, saying, "Steady Nerves is a well-balanced mix of intense rockers and mellow tunes. While no one would call Parker's voice "pretty", it suits his material." Parke Puterbaugh of Rolling Stone declared, "Steady Nerves is Parker's most engaging work since Squeezing Out Sparks."

== Track listing ==
All songs written by Graham Parker.

1. "Break Them Down"
2. "Mighty Rivers"
3. "Lunatic Fringe"
4. "Wake Up (Next to You)"
5. "When You Do That to Me"
6. "The Weekend's Too Short"
7. "Take Everything"
8. "Black Lincoln Continental"
9. "Canned Laughter"
10. "Everyone's Hand Is on the Switch"
11. "Locked into Green"
12. "Too Much Time to Think" [CD bonus track]

== Charts ==
Chart (1985)	Peak position
United States (Billboard 200)	57

== Personnel ==
- Graham Parker – lead and backing vocals, rhythm guitar
- Brinsley Schwarz – lead guitar, backing vocals
- George Small – keyboards
- Kevin Jenkins – bass
- Mike Braun – drums
- Huw Gower, William Wittman – additional backing vocals
- Louis Cortelezzi – saxophone on "Wake Up (Next to You)"
- Jay Leonhart – acoustic bass on "Locked Into Green"
- Uptown Horns – horns on "Locked Into Green"; arranged by Ralph Schuckett

Technical

- Carol Cafiero, Dan Nash – production assistance
- Hubert Kretzschmar – album cover, graphic design
- Bert Stern – photography
