= Struck by Lightning (album) =

Studio album by Graham Parker
- Released: 1991
- Studio: Dreamland (Hurley, New York)
- Genres: Rock, pop
- Labels: Demon; RCA
- Producer: Graham Parker

Graham Parker chronology
Human Soul (1989)	Struck by Lightning (1991)	Burning Questions (1992)

Struck by Lightning is a solo album by the English musician Graham Parker, released in 1991. It was Parker's best selling album of the 1990s, reaching number 131 on the Billboard 200 albums chart.

== Production ==
Produced by Parker, Struck by Lightning was recorded at Dreamland Recording Studios in Hurley, New York, near Woodstock. Jay Ungar, Larry Hoppen, and Garth Hudson contributed to the album. Pete Thomas played drums; Cindy Cashdollar played lap steel and dobro. John Sebastian played autoharp on "She Wants So Many Things". Parker played all of the guitar parts.

Many of the album's songs are about getting older and family life. "Ten Girls Ago" references Parker's former drug addiction. "They Murdered the Clown" and "When I Was King" are about the music business.

== Critical reception ==
Professional ratings
Review scores
Source	Rating
AllMusic	3.5/5 stars
Calgary Herald	B
Chicago Tribune	3.5/4 stars
Los Angeles Times	4/5 stars
Orlando Sentinel	5/5 stars
Rolling Stone	4/5 stars
The Tampa Tribune	3/4 stars
Vancouver Sun	5/5 stars

The Milwaukee Sentinel wrote that "Parker is obviously trying to stake out his own vision of what a middle-aged rock musician ought to be." The Boston Globe determined that, "musically, he's still playing in the melodic pop area that's been his stomping ground for some time." The Los Angeles Times stated that "Dylan's John Wesley Harding, Smokey Robinson and early Van Morrison are among the key stylistic and spiritual touchstones here."

The Austin American-Statesman concluded that Struck by Lightning "completes his transformation from British firebrand to Woodstock family man, though it retains both the emotional edge and lyrical incisiveness that have long distinguished his best work." The Chicago Tribune wrote that the album "sounds as intimate as a living-room jam session." The Calgary Herald deemed the songs "solid, workmanlike efforts."

== Track listing ==
CD version

1. "She Wants So Many Things" 6:08
2. "They Murdered the Clown" 3:54
3. "Strong Winds" 3:52
4. "The Kid with the Butterfly Net" 3:53
5. "And It Shook Me" 3:42
6. "Wrapping Paper" 3:38
7. "That's Where She Ends Up" 3:10
8. "A Brand New Book" 3:28
9. "Weeping Statues" 3:21
10. "Guardian Angel" 3:24
11. "Children and Dogs" 3:50
12. "Over the Border (To America)" 3:08
13. "When I Was King" 4:18
14. "Ten Girls Ago" 3:28
15. "The Sun Is Gonna Shine Again" 3:55

Vinyl version

Side one

1. "She Wants So Many Things" 6:08
2. "They Murdered the Clown" 3:54
3. "Strong Winds" 3:52
4. "The Kid with the Butterfly Net" 3:53
5. "And It Shook Me" 3:42
6. "That's Where She Ends Up" 3:10

Side two

1. "A Brand New Book" 3:28
2. "Weeping Statues" 3:21
3. "Wrapping Paper" 3:38
4. "Ten Girls Ago" 3:28
5. "I'm into Something Good" 1:52
6. "Over the Border (To America)" 3:08
7. "The Sun Is Gonna Shine Again" 3:55

Bonus EP

Side one

1. "Guardian Angels"
2. "Children and Dogs"

Side two

1. "When I Was King"
2. "Museum Piece"
3. "Museum of Stupidity"

== Charts ==
Chart (1991)	Peak position
United States (Billboard 200)	131

== Personnel ==
- Graham Parker – vocals, acoustic guitar, electric guitar, harmonica
- Andrew Bodnar – bass
- Pete Thomas – drums, percussion
- Andrew Bodnar, Graham Parker, Pete Thomas – arrangements

Technical

- Mastering – George Marino
- Engineer [assistant] – John Yates
- Engineer [overdubs] – Chris Andersen
- Engineer, mixer – David Cook
- Cover design – Wynn Dan
- Photography – Jolie Parker
