= Another Grey Area =

Studio album by Graham Parker
- Released: 15 March 1982
- Recorded: Record Plant, New York City
- Genre: Rock
- Label: RCA (UK & Europe); Arista (USA & Canada); Vertigo (New Zealand)
- Producer: Jack Douglas, Graham Parker

Graham Parker chronology
The Up Escalator (1980)	Another Grey Area (1982)	The Real Macaw (1983)

Another Grey Area is the first solo album by Graham Parker. It was released in 1982 on the Arista label. The album was produced by Jack Douglas and Graham Parker, and features Nicky Hopkins on acoustic piano.

Parker said Another Grey Area was a "beautiful" album, saying, "I've always been striving to make a record that sounds beautiful. I think Another Grey Area sounds beautiful. ... the perspective is just full. Everything is in the right place. It's not a question of sound. When I say sound, I mean putting instruments in the right perspectives, so you get a bass in the slot, so the whole thing holds together". Parker also claimed that the album featured better singing than his previous albums.

Another Grey Area, despite positive reception in the United States, was heavily criticized in Parker's home country of the United Kingdom. He reflected, "In England, the critics are panning it. They hate it. Because they're prejudiced. They've also missed the point of the lyrics. They think the songs are cop-outs, but they're not listening. They're listening to the fact that there isn't Graham Parker & the Rumour with the band being angry. You made the point exactly: the band was playing angrily as well and it wasn't necessary".

== Track listing ==
All tracks composed by Graham Parker.

Side 1

1. "Temporary Beauty" - 3:54
2. "Another Grey Area" - 3:01
3. "No More Excuses" - 4:31
4. "Dark Side of the Bright Lights" - 3:38
5. "Can't Waste a Minute" - 3:30
6. "Big Fat Zero" - 2:47

Side 2

1. "You Hit the Spot" - 3:31
2. "It's All Worth Nothing Alone" - 4:05
3. "Crying for Attention" - 4:07
4. "Thankless Task" - 4:13
5. "Fear Not" - 3:30

40th Anniversary Edition Bonus Tracks (2022, Iconoclassic Records)

1. "Habit Worth Forming" - 3:10
2. "You Hit the Spot (Extended Version)" - 3:51
3. "No More Excuses (Version)" - 2:47
4. "You Hit the Spot (Live Version)" - 4:25
5. "Another Grey Area (Live Version)" - 4:22

== Charts ==
Chart (1982)	Peak position
Australia (Kent Music Report)	98
United Kingdom (Official Charts Company)	40
United States (Billboard 200)	52

== Personnel ==
- Graham Parker – vocals, electric and acoustic guitars
- Nicky Hopkins – acoustic piano
- George Small – keyboards, ondioline
- Hugh McCracken – electric guitars, harmonica
- David Brown – electric guitars
- Doug Stegmeyer – bass
- Michael Braun – drums
- Kurt McGettrick – flute, baritone saxophone
- Jim Clouse – saxophones
- Paul Prestopino – banjo
- Jack Douglas – percussion
- Krystal Davis, Karen Lawrence, Eric Troyer, Fred Hostetler – backing Vocals

Personnel per Another Grey Area liner notes.
