= Human Soul =

Studio album by Graham Parker
- Released: 1989
- Genre: Rock
- Label: RCA

Graham Parker chronology
Live! Alone in America (1989)	Human Soul (1989)	Struck by Lightning (1991)

Human Soul is an album by the English musician Graham Parker.

The album peaked at No. 165 on the Billboard 200. Parker supported the album by touring with Dave Edmunds's Rock and Roll Revue.

== Production ==
Human Soul was originally divided into "Real" and "Surreal" sides. Pete Thomas, Steve Nieve, and Andrew Bodnar contributed to the album. "Slash and Burn" is about deforestation; "Green Monkeys" is about AIDS. "Soultime" was influenced by ska music.

== Critical reception ==
Professional ratings
Review scores
Source	Rating
AllMusic	2/5 stars
Calgary Herald	A−
Chicago Tribune	4/4 stars
Robert Christgau	C
The Encyclopedia of Popular Music	3/5 stars
Los Angeles Times	3/5 stars
MusicHound Rock: The Essential Album Guide	2/5 stars
Ottawa Citizen	4/5 stars
The Rolling Stone Album Guide	3.5/5 stars
Spin Alternative Record Guide	3/10

Rolling Stone called the album "an invigorating jolt—substantial and catchy songs, richly realized." The Chicago Tribune wrote that "Parker explores the soulfulness of his musical roots (the great Stax/Volt R & B records of the '60s) and the soullessness of the era in which he lives." The Calgary Herald noted that "the anger gives his love songs an edge and the man's aware of his own importance in the cosmic scheme of things."

The Toronto Star concluded that "Human Soul's best song is "'Big Man On Paper', a reflective, self-deprecating ballad that finds the expatriate Englishman wandering through a New York state shopping mall and trying, among other things, to make sense of 'the youth in their Whitesnake T-shirts'." The Boston Globe determined that "Parker has synthesized all his best ingredients over the past decade—from the soulfulness of his Howling Wind album and incendiary rock of Squeezing Out Sparks, to the biting politics displayed on his acoustic disc." The Los Angeles Times opined that "the production could stand to be sharper and the songs are uneven, but in scope, ambition and self-integration, he's closed out the '80s with what is at least his most interesting album of the decade."

AllMusic wrote that "Parker's music is subtly diverse, adding elements of worldbeat, reggae, pop, and folk to his R&B-fueled rock & roll; however, most of the impact of the music is lost by the slick, radio-ready production."

== Track listing ==
No.	Title	Length
1.	"Little Miss Understanding"
2.	"My Love's Strong"
3.	"Dancing for Money"
4.	"Call Me Your Doctor"
5.	"Big Man on Paper"
6.	"Soultime"
7.	"Everything Goes"
8.	"Sugar Gives You Energy"
9.	"Daddy's a Postman"
10.	"Green Monkeys"
11.	"I Was Wrong"
12.	"You Got the World (Right Where You Want It)"
13.	"Slash and Burn"
