= Burning Questions (Graham Parker album) =

Studio album by Graham Parker
- Released: 1992
- Label: Capitol; Demon
- Producer: Graham Parker, Jon Jacobs

Graham Parker chronology
Struck by Lightning (1991)	Burning Questions (1992)	Passion Is No Ordinary Word: The Graham Parker Anthology (1993)

Burning Questions is an album by the English musician Graham Parker, released in 1992. It was his only album for Capitol Records. Backed by his band, the Small Clubs, Parker supported the album with a North American tour. The album cover contained a sticker with the message "Caution: Contains Worthwhile Lyrics". A video was shot for "Release Me".

== Production ==
Recorded in 22 days, the album was produced by Parker and Jon Jacobs. Pete Thomas played drums on the album. Andrew Bodnar played bass; Mick Talbot played organ. "Long Stem Rose" employs a string section. "Short Memories" is about sending young people to war. "Just Like Joe Meek's Blues" references the troubled music producer. "Here It Comes Again" criticizes the rescinding of rights by political conservatives. Many songs address the problems with romantic love.

== Critical reception ==
Professional ratings
Review scores
Source	Rating
Calgary Herald	C+
Chicago Tribune	2.5/4 stars
The Encyclopedia of Popular Music	4/5 stars
The Indianapolis Star	3.5/4 stars
MusicHound Rock: The Essential Album Guide	2/5 stars
Orlando Sentinel	2/5 stars
The Philadelphia Inquirer	3.5/4 stars
(The New) Rolling Stone Album Guide	3.5/5 stars
Spin Alternative Record Guide	4/10
Martin C. Strong	5/10

The Sun-Sentinel noted that "there is a warmness to the roots music on Burning Questions, and intelligence in the lyrics." The Calgary Herald opined that the music "just lays there and feigns passion when it's only going through the motions." The Kitchener-Waterloo Record wrote that "Parker has become more willing than ever to expose his hard-edged romanticism, as the superb 'Oasis' and the moving 'Worthy of Your Love' attest."

The Chicago Tribune concluded that "Parker still may be ticked off at the world, but it sounds like everybody else in the studio is just punching the clock." The St. Petersburg Times determined that "Parker's grainy vocals—alternately full of yearning, anger and irony—gain intensity." The Philadelphia Inquirer considered Burning Questions to be one of the best albums of 1992, writing that the music "is his punchiest and most soulful accompaniment in years." The Morning Call and The Virginian-Pilot also listed the album among the best of the year.

== Track listing ==
No.	Title	Length
1.	"Release Me"
2.	"Too Many Knots to Untangle"
3.	"Just Like Joe Meek's Blues"
4.	"Love Is a Burning Question"
5.	"Platinum Blonde"
6.	"Long Stem Rose"
7.	"Short Memories"
8.	"Here It Comes Again"
9.	"Mr. Tender"
10.	"Just Like Herman Hesse"
11.	"Yesterday's Cloud"
12.	"Oasis"
13.	"Worthy of Your Love"
