= The Real Macaw =

Studio album by Graham Parker
- Released: July 1983
- Genre: Rock
- Length: 39:06
- Label: Arista
- Producer: David Kershenbaum

Graham Parker chronology
Another Grey Area (1982)	The Real Macaw (1983)	Steady Nerves (1985)

The Real Macaw is an album by Graham Parker, released in 1983.

== Critical reception ==
Professional ratings
Review scores
Source	Rating
AllMusic	3/5 stars
Robert Christgau	B+
Classic Rock	3/5 stars
The Encyclopedia of Popular Music	3/5 stars
MusicHound Rock: The Essential Album Guide	2/5 stars
Rolling Stone	4/5 stars
The Rolling Stone Album Guide	3/5 stars
Spin Alternative Record Guide	5/10

Rolling Stone called The Real Macaw "a propulsive, brilliantly sung LP." Trouser Press called the album "a disc that is watered down and should have been harder." PopMatters wrote that "even with some dated-sounded keyboard work, it's right up there with the best pop-oriented rock albums of all time."

== Track listing ==
All songs written by Graham Parker

1. "Just Like a Man"
2. "You Can't Take Love for Granted"
3. "Glass Jaw"
4. "Passive Resistance"
5. "Sounds Like Chains"
6. "Life Gets Better"
7. "A Miracle a Minute"
8. "Beyond a Joke"
9. "Last Couple on the Dance Floor"
10. "Anniversary"
11. "(Too Late) The Smart Bomb"

== Charts ==
Chart (1983)	Peak position
Australia (Kent Music Report)	57
US Billboard Top LPs & Tape	59

== Personnel ==
- Graham Parker - lead and backing vocals, "blue and hollow" guitars
- Brinsley Schwarz - "orange and black" guitars
- George Small - keyboards
- Kevin Jenkins - bass
- Gilson Lavis - drums

Additional musicians

- Sarah Larson - violin
- Mel Collins - saxophone
- Morris Pert - percussion
- Andy Ebsworth - Linn drum programming

Studio

- Phil Thornalley - recording and mixing engineer
- Recorded at Ramport Studios, Battersea
- Mixed at Eel Pie Island Studio, Twickenham
