= The Mona Lisa's Sister =

Studio album by Graham Parker
- Released: April 1988
- Recorded: 1987–1988
- Genre: Blues rock, soul, rhythm and blues, reggae fusion
- Length: 38:48
- Label: RCA
- Producer: Graham Parker, Brinsley Schwarz

Graham Parker chronology
Steady Nerves (1985)	The Mona Lisa's Sister (1988)	Live! Alone in America (1989)

Professional ratings
Review scores
Source	Rating
AllMusic	2.5/5 stars
Robert Christgau	C+
Rolling Stone	4/5 stars
Trouser Press	(Favorable)

The Mona Lisa's Sister is a 1988 album by Graham Parker. It was Parker's first album for RCA following an acrimonious split with Atlantic and the first he produced himself (with Brinsley Schwarz). The "stripped-down" sound of the album garnered critical acclaim and presaged a back-to-basics trend in rock music in the 1990s. It was re-released by Buddah Records in 1999 with a bonus track, "Ordinary Girl", the B-side to "Get Started. Start a Fire". The album debuted at No. 132 on the Billboard 200 on 28 May 1988, peaking at No. 77.

In 1989, it was ranked No. 97 on Rolling Stone's list of the 100 best albums of the 1980s.

== Track listing ==
All song by Graham Parker except (11)

1. "Don't Let It Break You Down" – 3:34
2. "Under the Mask of Happiness" – 3:34
3. "Back in Time" – 3:24
4. "I'm Just Your Man" – 3:41
5. "OK Hieronymus" – 4:15
6. "Get Started. Start a Fire" – 5:08
7. "The Girl Isn't Ready" – 3:32
8. "Blue Highways" – 2:35
9. "Success" – 3:48
10. "I Don't Know" – 2:47
11. "Cupid" - (Sam Cooke) – 2:30

=== Bonus track – 1999 Buddha re-release ===
12. "Ordinary Girl"

=== Bonus tracks – 2016 Expanded Edition ===
12. "Ordinary Girl"
13. "Durban Poison"
14. "Burning on a Higher Flame"
15. "There's a Ghost in My House"

== Charts ==
Chart (1988)	Peak position
Australia (Kent Music Report)	81
US Billboard 200	77

== Personnel ==
- Graham Parker - lead and backing vocals, acoustic guitar, producer
- Brinsley Schwarz - electric guitar, backing vocals, percussion, producer
- Andrew Bodnar - bass guitar
- James Hallawell - keyboards
- Terry Williams - drums
- Pete Thomas - drums on (4) and (7)
- Andy Duncan - drums on (9)
- Christie Chapman - backing vocals

Technical

- Jon Jacobs - engineer
- Martin Edwards - assistant engineer
- Jack Drummond - cover painting
- Jolie Parker - photographs
