= 12 Haunted Episodes =

Studio album by Graham Parker
- Released: 1995
- Label: Razor & Tie
- Producer: Graham Parker

Graham Parker chronology
Live Alone! Discovering Japan (1993)	12 Haunted Episodes (1995)	Live from New York, NY (1996)

12 Haunted Episodes is an album by the English musician Graham Parker, released in 1995 on Razor & Tie. Parker supported the album by touring with his backing band, the Episodes. It was Parker's first studio album for an independent label. 12 Haunted Episodes is primarily an acoustic album.

== Production ==
Recorded in Saugerties, New York, the album was produced by Parker. He chose to write the songs in an open G tuning, after being annoyed when someone advised creating an album similar in style to the rock and roll of Squeezing Out Sparks. Parker thought that he was able to sing more "naturally" with the new tuning. He spent five hours recording the demo, then decided a few days later to add overdubs to it with other musicians.

Many songs are about the work of maintaining romantic love. "Disney's America" is about the proposed theme park. "Haunted Episodes" added a flute to the instrumentation. "Force of Nature" quotes Bob Dylan's "She Belongs to Me".

== Critical reception ==
Professional ratings
Review scores
Source	Rating
Daily Breeze	3.5/4 stars
The Encyclopedia of Popular Music	3/5 stars
The Indianapolis Star	2.5/4 stars
MusicHound Rock: The Essential Album Guide	3/5 stars
Orlando Sentinel	2/5 stars
Rolling Stone	3.5/5 stars
Spin Alternative Record Guide	6/10
Martin C. Strong	5/10
USA Today	3/4 stars

The Orlando Sentinel wrote that "Parker's famous acerbic wit is either missing or misplaced, and he seems to be low on hooks at the moment." The Philadelphia Inquirer determined that "the acoustic-flavored tunes tend toward folk-rock, and the usually pugnacious Brit focuses on his tender and introspective side." Rolling Stone stated: "Autumnal in mood, gracious and honest, this is music of a clean, unsentimental maturity."

The Washington Post opined that "it's doubtful any other album this year will bring as much insight and passion to the subject of adult romance." The Indianapolis Star concluded that Parker "abandons vitriolic irony for the more mature, and less memorable, perspective of a contented grownup." The Guardian noted the "comfy tastefulness" and labeled the album "one for designer bedsits."

== Track listing ==
No.	Title	Length
1.	"Partner for Life"
2.	"Pollinate"
3.	"Force of Nature"
4.	"Disney's America"
5.	"Haunted Episodes"
6.	"Next Phase"
7.	"Honest Work"
8.	"Cruel Stage"
9.	"See Yourself"
10.	"Loverman"
11.	"Fly"
12.	"First Day of Spring"
