= Jake Riviera =

British music business entrepreneur (born 1948)

Jake Riviera (born Andrew Jakeman, February 1948, in Edgware, Middlesex, England) is a British music business entrepreneur, best known for his management of such performers as Elvis Costello and Nick Lowe and as co-founder (with Dave Robinson) of the pioneering British indie label, Stiff Records.

== Life and career ==
Riviera attended St Nicholas Grammar School in Northwood, London, and was in school bands and local groups in north-west London in the 1960s, and became road manager of pub-rock act Chilli Willi and the Red Hot Peppers in the early 1970s.

Assuming the role of manager, he engineered a street-level marketing campaign on behalf of the hard-gigging group by working with graphic designer Barney Bubbles.

In 1975, Riviera organised 'Naughty Rhythms', a package tour featuring Chilli Willi, Dr. Feelgood, and Kokomo. When pub-rock failed to make the leap out of smaller venues, Chilli Willi split and Riviera became tour manager for Dr. Feelgood for the group's US dates in early 1976. Encountering independent local record labels, Riviera was inspired on his return to the UK to found Stiff (music business parlance for a flop) with Dave Robinson, then manager of Graham Parker & the Rumour in mid-1976.

Riviera signed the Damned - whom he also managed - to Stiff in September 1976, ensuring that the group was the first punk act to release a record with their October 1976 single "New Rose". In November 1976, Riviera arranged for Stiff to follow that with the single release of the Blank Generation EP which contained the punk anthem of the same name by Richard Hell & The Voidoids.

Riviera managed other early Stiff signings Elvis Costello and Nick Lowe, who was also in-house producer, and in 1977 recruited Bubbles to work with him on an impressive run of designs for record sleeves, posters, badges and advertising and promotional campaigns for Lowe, The Damned, Costello and such performers as Ian Dury, Wreckless Eric and the veteran music hall star Max Wall.

In late 1977 Riviera left Stiff, taking with him clients Costello and Lowe to the newly launched label Radar Records, set up by former UA Records executives Martin Davies and Andrew Lauder.

Costello and Lowe scored successes with, respectively, such albums as This Year's Model and Jesus of Cool (released as Pure Pop For Now People in the US), before joining Riviera at his and Lauder's next label launch, F-Beat Records, in 1980. As at Radar, Bubbles was F-Beat's art-director.

F-Beat also released new music by contemporary artists such as Lowe's wife Carlene Carter, Clive Langer & the Boxes and Blanket of Secrecy, while Riviera, Lauder and Costello pioneered appreciation of archive music by reissuing music by a range of artists on their Demon and Edsel imprints, including classic albums by Al Green, the Pretty Things and the Merseybeats.

Riviera's management of British pop/rock group Squeeze resulted in Elvis Costello producing the 1981 album East Side Story, which featured the hit single "Tempted".

F-Beat folded in the mid-1980s, by which time Demon had developed into a large specialist label with several offshoots. It was acquired by Crimson productions in 1998 and now lays claim to being Britain's biggest independent music group. Riviera worked with Costello until 1993. Nick Lowe is currently managed by 2 Jakes Management, which, despite the name, has nothing to do with Riviera.
