= John Earle (musician) =

Irish musician (1944–2008)

- Born: 6 October 1944; Dublin, Ireland
- Died: 7 May 2008 (aged 63)
- Occupation: Saxophonist
- Instrument: Saxophone
- Years active: 1966–2008

John "Irish" Earle (6 October 1944 – 7 May 2008) was an Irish saxophonist, best known for his solo on Thin Lizzy's live versions of "Dancing in the Moonlight", such as that on their live album Live and Dangerous (1978). He also worked with Ian Dury, Graham Parker, Gnidrolog, Rory Gallagher, The Boomtown Rats, Randy Crawford, Shakin' Stevens and many others

== Biography ==
Earle went to school at Synge Street CBS, and started playing the clarinet as a young boy, and later learned to play the saxophone. After a short career as a commercial artist, he started his professional music career in the mid-1960s, playing in showbands that were popular in Ireland at the time. In 1966, he moved to Libya to play in a covers band on Wheelus Air Force base for US Air Force personnel. Following this he moved to Germany to perform for US servicemen on other US bases, performing covers of popular chart hits. Around this time, he was given the nickname "Irish" by fellow band members to identify him from two other Johns playing in the same band, this stuck with him throughout his career in the UK. Towards the end of the decade, he joined the Krautrock band Nine Days Wonder, performing in clubs across Europe and recording his first album with them.

In 1972, Earle left Germany and moved to England to further his career. After a spell with progressive rock band Gnidrolog, there was a lack of musical work so he took a job in a record packing house distributing albums, including Gnidrolog's. While attending various auditions and jam sessions, he met Ian Dury by chance in the Hope and Anchor, Islington, which led to him becoming a member of his backing band Kilburn and the High Roads. In 1977, he performed and played a solo on the song "England's Glory", written by Dury, performed by English music hall veteran Max Wall and produced by Dave Edmunds. He also worked at the newly reopened Rainbow Theatre as a member of the stage crew during 1977.

Following an introduction to Stiff Records supremo and fellow Dubliner Dave Robinson, he progressed to playing in Graham Parker and The Rumour in the mid-1970s, playing on the albums Heat Treatment and Stick to Me. It was through their connection as support band to Thin Lizzy in 1976, that he was invited to play saxophone during Lizzy's main set. He later played on The Clash's album London Calling, playing double-tracked baritone saxophone on the track "The Right Profile".

Earle later moved back to Ireland, residing in Rathmines, Dublin. He frequently played with local blues and jazz musicians including Tam White and Ben Prevo.

He died on 7 May 2008 at the age of 63.
