= Andrew Bodnar =

English bass player (1954–2026)

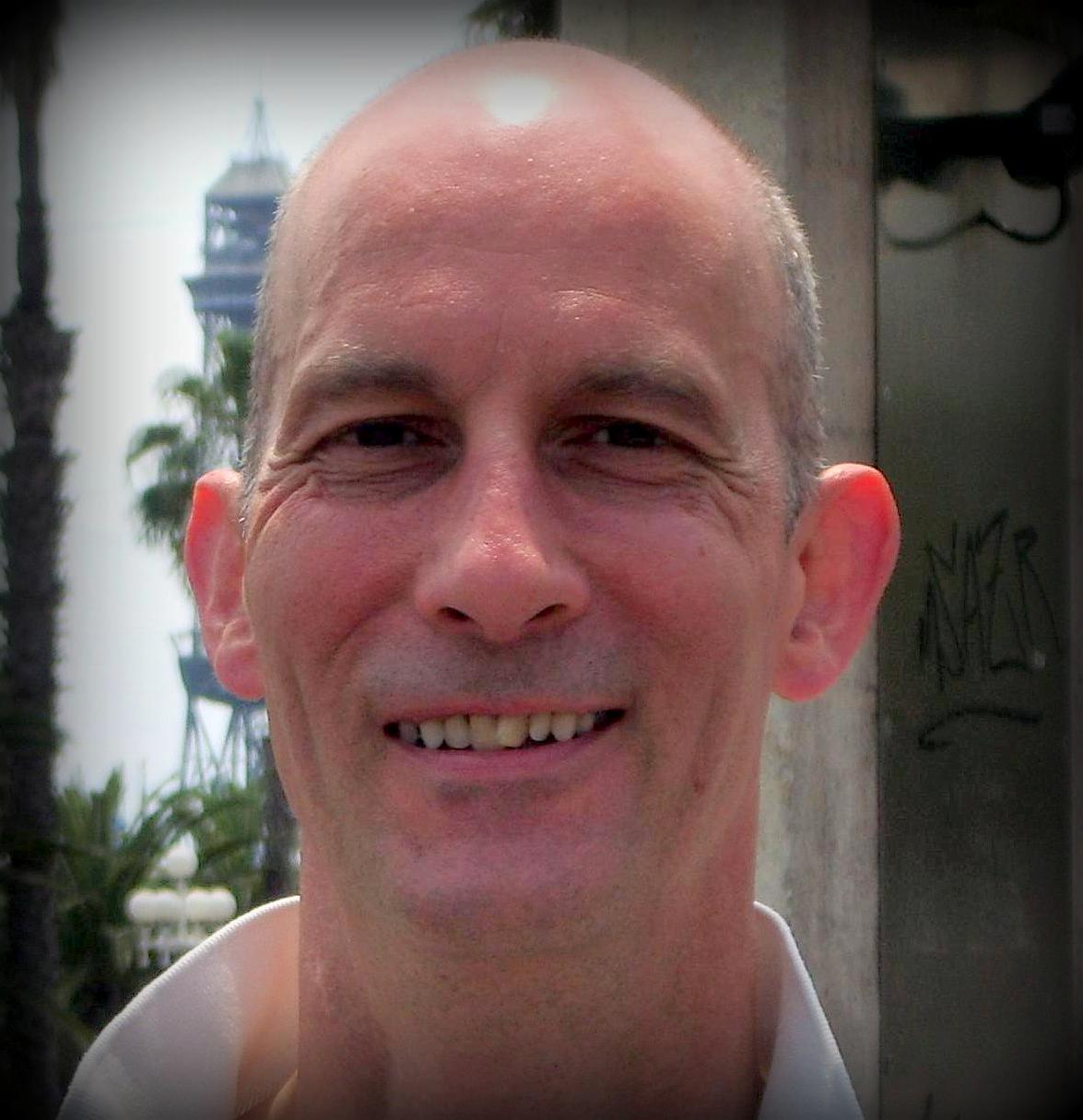
- Bodnar in 2009

Background information
- Born: Andrew P. Bodnar; 23 September 1954; Kennington, London, England
- Died: January 2026 (aged 71)
- Genres: Punk rock; pop punk
- Occupation: Musician
- Instrument: Bass guitar
- Years active: 1975–2026
- Formerly of: The Rumour

Andrew P. Bodnar (23 September 1954 – January 2026) was an English bass player.

== Life and career ==
Bodnar was born in Kennington, London on 23 September 1954, and grew up in Clapham. After meeting drummer Steve Goulding, the two began playing together as a rhythm section while still at school. They spent their teenage years auditioning and busking whenever they could, and were gigging around London with a Cajun-influenced band called Bontemps Roulez just prior to forming The Rumour in 1975. Bodnar is probably best known for his membership with Graham Parker and The Rumour from 1975 to 1980, for playing the distinctive reggae-flavoured bassline on "Watching the Detectives" by Elvis Costello, and for bass playing and co-writing Nick Lowe's "I Love the Sound of Breaking Glass", which he co-wrote with Lowe and Goulding.

He went on to become the Thompson Twins' touring bassist, promoting their hit album Quick Step & Side Kick during 1982–83, and since played live, or on recording sessions for many artists, including Angie Bowie, The Pretenders, and Tina Turner. He also played bass for Graham Parker on his various solo albums from 1988 through the mid-1990s. Graham Parker and The Rumour reunited in 2011 to record two new albums, and they toured the UK, US and Europe through to late 2015.

Bodnar played himself in the Judd Apatow film, This Is 40, released in December 2012.

Bodnar was diagnosed with liver cancer in 2023. He died in January 2026, at the age of 71.

== Partial discography ==
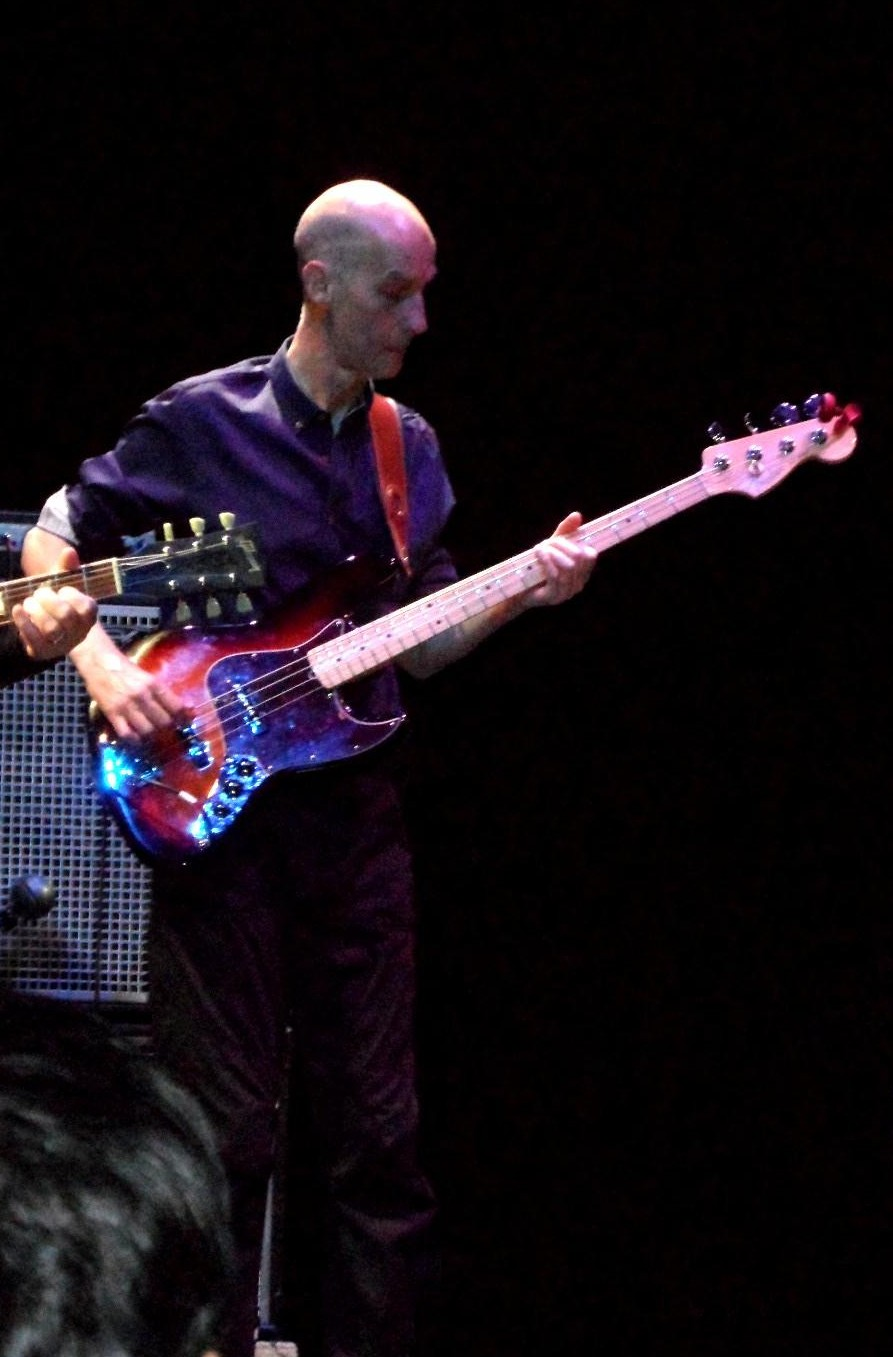
Bodnar playing with Graham Parker and the Rumour, Chicago, 2012

=== Graham Parker and the Rumour ===
- Howlin' Wind (1976)
- Heat Treatment (1976)
- Stick to Me (1977)
- The Parkerilla (1978)
- Squeezing Out Sparks (1979)
- The Up Escalator (1980)
- Three Chords Good (2012)
- Mystery Glue (2015)

=== The Rumour ===
- Max (1977)
- Frogs Sprouts Clogs and Krauts (1978)
- Purity Of Essence (1980)

=== Graham Parker ===
- The Mona Lisa's Sister (1988)
- Human Soul (1989)
- Struck By Lightning (1991)
- Burning Questions (1992)
- Acid Bubblegum (1996)

=== Other artists ===
- Renowned – Gay & Terry Woods (1976)
- "Watching the Detectives" – Elvis Costello (single, 1977)
- Carlene Carter – Carlene Carter (1978)
- Jesus of Cool – Nick Lowe (1978)
- Black & Dekker – Desmond Dekker (1980)
- Escape Artist – Garland Jeffreys (1981)
- Rock 'n' Roll Adult – Garland Jeffreys (1981)
- Learning to Crawl – the Pretenders (1984)
- The Rose of England – Nick Lowe (1985)
- The Blue Hour – Raise the Dragon (1985)
- The Sing Market – The Sing Market (1986)
