= Graham Parker =

English singer-songwriter (born 1950)

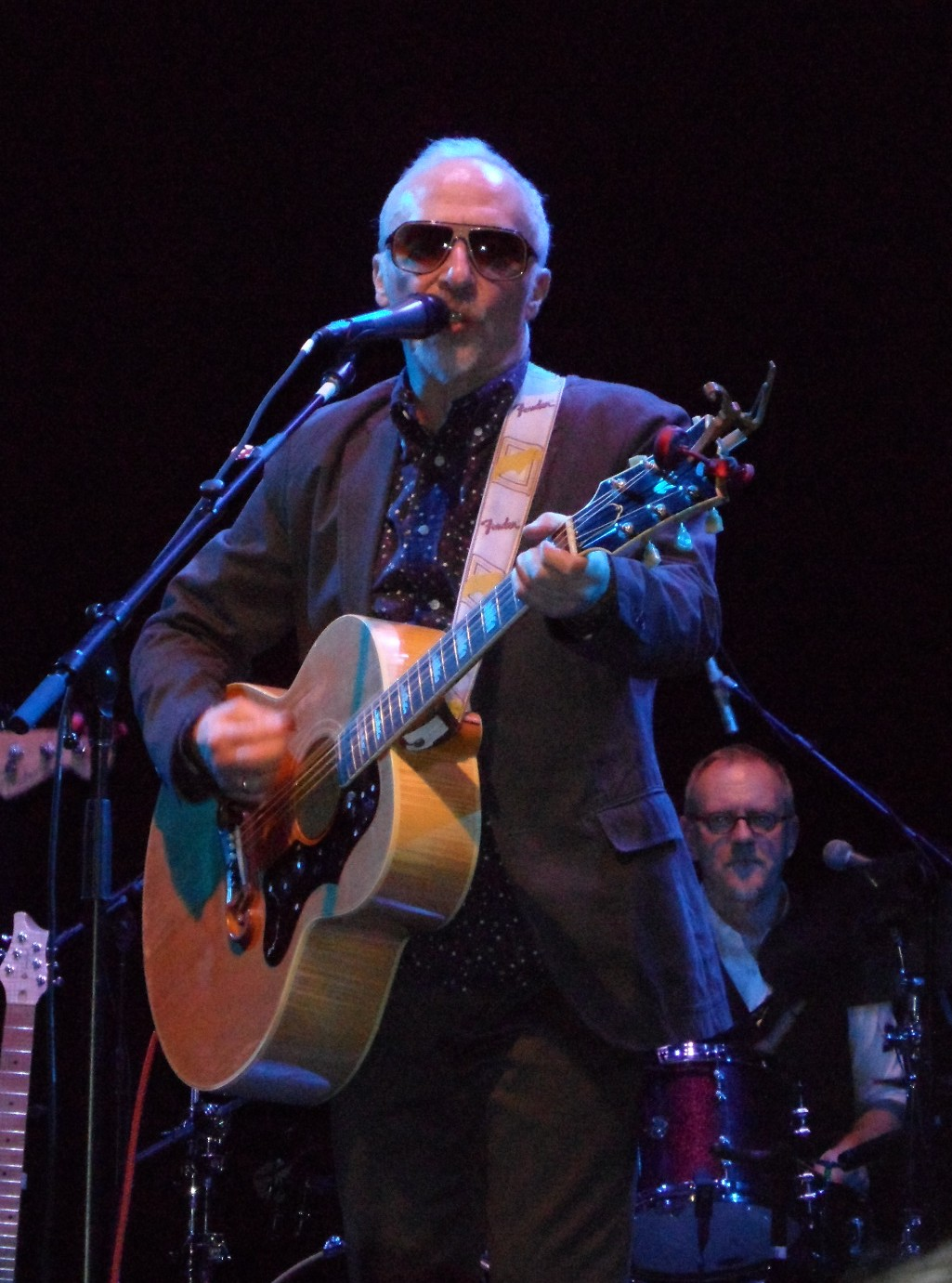
- Parker performing in 2012

Background information
- Born: Graham Thomas Parker; 18 November 1950 (age 75); Hackney, London, England
- Genres: Rock; new wave; pub rock; rock 'n' roll
- Occupations: Singer; songwriter; musician; writer
- Instruments: Vocals; guitar
- Years active: 1970s–present
- Labels: 100%; Arista; Big Stir; Bloodshot; Buy or Die; Capitol; Dakota Arts; Demon; Elektra; Hannibal; Hip-O; Mercury; Razor & Tie; RCA; Rebound; Rock the House; UpYours; Vertigo; Windsong
- Website: grahamparker.net

Graham Thomas Parker (born 18 November 1950) is an English singer-songwriter, who is best known as the lead singer of the British band Graham Parker & the Rumour.

== Life and career ==
=== Early career (1960s–1976) ===
Parker was born in Hackney, East London, in 1950. He was a pupil at Chobham Secondary Modern School in Surrey. After the success of the Beatles, Parker and some other 12/13-year-olds formed the Deepcut Three, soon renamed the Black Rockers. None of the members actually learned to play their instruments, however, and were merely dress-up bands, adopting Beatle haircuts, black jeans and polo neck sweaters. By the time Parker was 15 he was a fan of soul music, especially Otis Redding, and would go to dance clubs in the nearby towns of Woking and Camberley where there was a thriving appreciation of soul music, Motown and ska.

Parker left school at 16 and went to work at the Animal Virus Research Institute in Pirbright, Surrey, where he bred animals for foot-and-mouth disease research. At 18 he left the job and moved to Guernsey in the Channel Islands where he took a variety of jobs, picking tomatoes, digging ditches, collecting money from pinball machines, and working in a bakery. In Guernsey he bought an acoustic guitar and began to learn fingerpicking style and began writing songs with lyrics heavily influenced by the psychedelic music of the time.

Parker returned to England for a year, living in Chichester in Sussex where he worked at the Chichester Rubber Glove Factory. By 1971, he had left England again and spent time in Paris. From France, Parker hitchhiked through Spain to Morocco, where he travelled around for a year before moving to Gibraltar. In Gibraltar he worked on the docks unloading frozen foods, which he then helped deliver to supermarkets. His guitar playing and writing skills were improving, and after playing songs to a few locals in a bar, he found himself on an afternoon show on Gibraltar television where he performed two or three of his own songs. At that time, a strongly psychedelic-influenced band named Pegasus often played in the same bar and asked Parker to join them. With Parker in the band playing a borrowed electric guitar, Pegasus played one show in Gibraltar before going to Tangier, Morocco, where they briefly performed in a nightclub. Parker, however, was growing out of the hippie trappings and decided the band needed to learn a few songs that involved major keys (all the songs they played were in A minor) and so taught the members some of the soul numbers he had loved as a youth, including Wilson Pickett's "In the Midnight Hour".

In late 1972, Parker returned to England and lived with his parents, working at a petrol station around the corner from his childhood home in Deepcut. By now he was determined to pursue a career in music and worked steadily on improving his guitar playing and song writing. In late 1974 he placed an ad in Melody Maker seeking like-minded backing musicians. One of the musicians who answered the ad was Noel Brown, a guitarist who lived in south London. Brown introduced him to Paul "Bassman" Riley who had recently been a member of Chilli Willi and the Red Hot Peppers. (Brown also found Parker a gig at Southern Comfort, a tiny hamburger café on Seven Sisters Road in Finsbury Park, London where he played solo, performing a mixture of original songs and covers.) Riley thought Parker should meet Dave Robinson, the manager of the by now defunct Brinsley Schwarz band. Robinson had a small studio above the Hope & Anchor pub in Islington and began to record Parker, sometimes solo and sometimes with a few musicians behind him.

One of the songs Parker recorded was "Between You and Me." This demo version ended up on Parker's first album, Howlin' Wind, after the Rumour tried to record it but failed to achieve the natural feel of the demo. Another song, "Nothin's Gonna Pull Us Apart" was played, in demo form, on the Charlie Gillett show "Honky Tonk" on BBC London 94.9. On hearing the song, Nigel Grainge from Phonogram Records called Gillett and asked who the new singer was. By now Robinson had become Parker's manager and a deal with Phonogram was struck. Robinson then went about recruiting the musicians who would become the Rumour, and recording for Howlin' Wind began in the winter of 1975 with Nick Lowe producing. In 1975, he recorded a few demo tracks in London with Dave Robinson, who would shortly found Stiff Records and who connected Parker with his first backing band of note, the Rumour. Parker had one track, "Back to Schooldays", released on the compilation album, A Bunch of Stiff Records for Stiff Records.

In the summer of 1975, Parker joined ex-members of three British pub rock bands to form Graham Parker and the Rumour: Parker (lead vocals, guitar) with Brinsley Schwarz (lead guitar) and Bob Andrews (keyboards) (both ex Brinsley Schwarz), Martin Belmont (rhythm guitar, ex Ducks Deluxe) and Andrew Bodnar (bass) and Steve Goulding (drums). They began in the pub rock scene, augmented at times by a four-man horn section known as the Rumour Horns: John "Irish" Earle (saxophone), Chris Gower (trombone), Dick Hanson (trumpet), and Ray Beavis (saxophone).

The band's first album, Howlin' Wind, was released to acclaim in April 1976 and was rapidly followed by the stylistically similar Heat Treatment. A mixture of rock, ballads, and reggae-influenced numbers, these albums reflected Parker's early influences and contained the songs which formed the core of Parker's live shows – "Black Honey", "Soul Shoes", "Lady Doctor", "Fool's Gold", and his early signature tune "Don't Ask Me Questions", which hit the top 40 in the UK Singles Chart.

Establishing a recording career in early 1976, Parker preceded two other new wave English singer-songwriters with whom he is often compared: Elvis Costello and Joe Jackson. (Costello's first single was released in 1977, and Jackson's first solo single in late 1978). Jackson said of Parker in a 1979 interview, "Graham Parker I really like. I think he's very genuine."

=== New direction (1977) ===
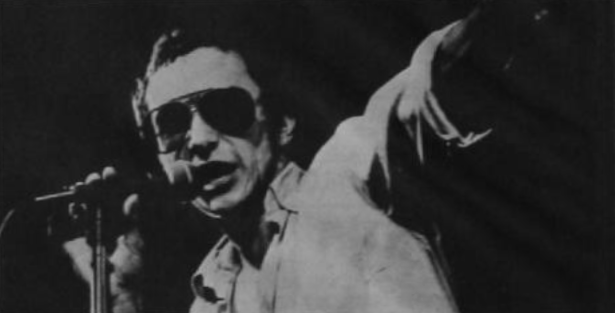
Parker in 1977

Graham Parker and the Rumour appeared on BBC television's Top of the Pops in 1977, performing their version of The Trammps' "Hold Back the Night" from The Pink Parker EP, a top 30 hit in the UK Singles Chart in March 1977. At this point, Parker began to change his songwriting style, hoping to break into the American market. The first fruits of this new direction appeared on Stick To Me (1977), which broke the top 20 on the UK Albums Chart.

Parker and the Rumour gained a following in Australia thanks to the support of community radio (4ZZZ, 3RRR), Sydney independent rock station Double Jay (2JJ) and the ABC's weekly pop TV show Countdown, which gave the group nationwide exposure. They made their first tour there in 1978, where they spotted rising Australian band the Sports, who subsequently supported Parker and the Rumour on their early 1979 UK tour. The group made a second Australian tour in late 1979, when Parker appeared on Countdown as a guest presenter.

=== Squeezing Out Sparks (1978–1979) ===
An official Graham Parker and the Rumour live album, The Parkerilla, issued in 1978, had nothing new: three sides were live, with versions of previously released songs; the fourth was devoted to a "disco" remake of "Hey Lord, Don't Ask Me Questions". The Parkerilla satisfied his contractual obligation to Mercury Records, freeing him to sign with Arista. Parker had long been dissatisfied with the performance of Mercury Records, finally issuing in 1979 as a single B-side "Mercury Poisoning" a song that directly attacked it. The flip side of the single was a cover of the Jackson Five song "I Want You Back (Alive)."

Graham Parker and The Rumour were one of the four support acts for Bob Dylan at the Picnic at Blackbushe on 15 July 1978. The band also opened Richard Branson's new club The Venue, London, in November 1978.

Energized by his new label, Arista Records, and with record producer Jack Nitzsche, Parker wrote the songs that would form the basis for Squeezing Out Sparks, widely held to be the best album of his career. For this album, The Rumour's brass section, prominent on all previous albums, was jettisoned.

Squeezing Out Sparks (1979) was named by Rolling Stone at No. 335 on its List of Rolling Stone's 500 Greatest Albums of All Time. In an early 1987 Rolling Stone list of their top 100 albums from 1967 to 1987, Squeezing Out Sparks was ranked at No. 45, while Howlin' Wind came in at No. 54. The album features several of Parker's most famous songs, including "Passion Is No Ordinary Word", "You Can't Be Too Strong", and the singles "Local Girls", "Protection", and "Discovering Japan". The companion live album Live Sparks, was sent to US radio stations as part of a concerted promotional campaign.

The jettisoned brass section continued to play on other people's records, credited as The Irish Horns (on the album London Calling by The Clash) or The Rumour Brass, most notably on Katrina and the Waves' 1985 hit "Walking On Sunshine".

=== The end of The Rumour (1980) ===
Bob Andrews left The Rumour in early 1980, and was not officially replaced. However, in studio sessions for the next album, Nicky Hopkins and Danny Federici (of The E Street Band) played keyboards.

1980's The Up Escalator was Parker's highest-charting album in the UK, and was produced by Jimmy Iovine. The album featured the single "Stupefaction" and the track "Endless Night", which had guest vocals from Bruce Springsteen. The front cover of the album credited only Graham Parker, not "Graham Parker and The Rumour". The album was certified Gold in Canada (for sales of more than 50,000 copies).

The Up Escalator would prove to be Parker's last album with the Rumour until a reunion decades later. However, Rumour guitarist Brinsley Schwarz reunited with Parker in 1983 and played on most of his albums through to the decade's end. Other Rumour members also played with Parker in later years: bassist Andrew Bodnar would rejoin Parker from 1988 through the mid-1990s, and drummer Steve Goulding would play on Parker's 2001 album Deepcut To Nowhere.

=== Commercial success (1981–1990) ===
The 1980s were Parker's most commercially successful years, with well-financed recordings and radio and video play. His follow-up to The Up Escalator, 1982's Another Grey Area, used session musicians Nicky Hopkins and Hugh McCracken. This album charted at UK No. 40 and US No. 51, and spun off a top 50 UK single in "Temporary Beauty".

1983's The Real Macaw, with drumming by Gilson Lavis of Squeeze and Brinsley Schwarz on guitar, did not fare as well, hitting US No. 59 on the album charts but missing the UK charts altogether. However, Parker's 1985 release Steady Nerves (credited to Graham Parker and The Shot) was a moderate success and included his only US top 40 hit "Wake Up (Next to You)". The Shot was a four-piece backing band, all of whom had played on either The Real Macaw or Another Grey Area: Brinsley Schwarz (guitar), George Small (keyboards), Kevin Jenkins (bass) and Michael Braun (drums). Steady Nerves was recorded in New York City, and Parker began living mostly in the United States during this time.

Record label changes came quickly after the mid-1980s, partly accounting for the number of compilation albums in Graham Parker's discography. Particularly unproductive was Parker's tenure at Atlantic Records, where he released nothing and signed to RCA Records. He began producing his own recordings and issued The Mona Lisa's Sister. The backing band for this album included former Rumour-mates Schwarz and Bodnar; keyboardists James Hallawell and Steve Nieve; and drummer Terry Williams (replaced on one cut by Andy Duncan, and two others by Pete Thomas, who, like Nieve, was a member of Elvis Costello and the Attractions). Rolling Stone magazine ranked The Mona Lisa's Sister at No. 97 on its list of The 100 Greatest Albums of the 1980s.

=== The 1990s ===
Parker continued to record for RCA through the early 1990s. Long-time guitarist Schwarz once again left Parker after the 1989 album Human Soul. Parker's 1991 offering, Struck By Lightning, had Bodnar and Pete Thomas in the backing band, as well as guest appearances from The Band's Garth Hudson on keyboards and John Sebastian on autoharp. However, the album's chart peak of US No. 131 saw Parker dropped by the label. 1992's Burning Questions was released by Capitol Records, who promptly dropped him after the album failed to sell.

A 1994 Christmas-themed EP release (Graham Parker's Christmas Cracker) was issued on Dakota Arts Records, before Parker found a more permanent home on American independent label Razor & Tie. After the personal 12 Haunted Episodes, and 1996's Acid Bubblegum (featuring Jimmy Destri of Blondie on keyboards), Parker grew quiet in the late 1990s. However, he continued to play live fairly regularly, often working with backing band The Figgs (who, like The Rumour, when not backing Parker also issue records as a discrete unit).

=== To the present ===
Parker at Brit's Pub in Minneapolis, 2003

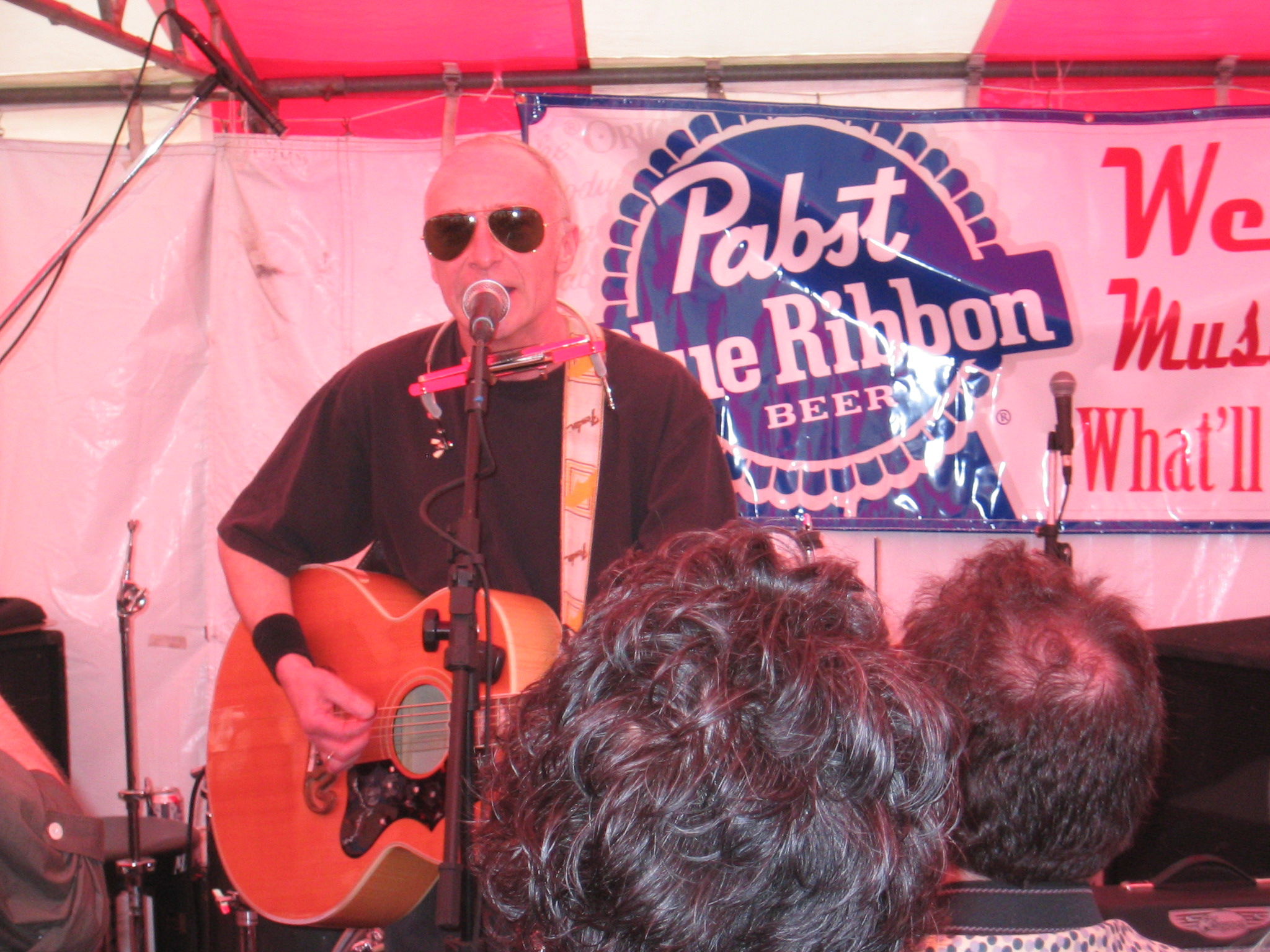
Parker at SXSW, 2007

Parker began a more active period in 2001, with the UK re-release of his early Rumour work, and with his third studio album for Razor & Tie, Deepcut to Nowhere. In 2003, he collaborated with Kate Pierson of the B-52's and Bill Janovitz of Buffalo Tom to record an album of lesser-known John Lennon/Paul McCartney compositions that had never been recorded by The Beatles. The album, called From a Window: Lost Songs of Lennon & McCartney, was credited to "Pierson, Parker, Janovitz". Also in 2003, Parker contributed a solo acoustic version of Pink Floyd's "Comfortably Numb" to the compilation album, A Fair Forgery of Pink Floyd.

New solo work continued with 2004's Your Country, which saw Parker switch labels to Chicago-based indie Bloodshot Records and was co-produced by John Would at Stanley Recording in Venice, California. The album was recorded and mixed in two weeks.

Songs of No Consequence was recorded with The Figgs in 2005. A show from the ensuing tour with the Figgs was broadcast on FM radio and released as an album in 2006. In March 2007, a new full-length album, Don't Tell Columbus, was released.

In addition to his records, Parker published an illustrated science fiction novella, The Great Trouser Mystery in 1980. He published a set of short stories, Carp Fishing on Valium, in June 2000. His third book, the novel The Other Life of Brian, appeared in September 2003.

In early 2011, Parker reunited with all five original members of The Rumour to record a new album, Three Chords Good. It was released in November 2012. Music journalist, Stephen Thomas Erlewine noted that the release was "the rare reunion that simultaneously looks back while living in the present." Meanwhile, the Judd Apatow film This Is 40, in which Parker and Rumour play themselves, was released a month later, in December 2012.

The Parker/Rumour reunion continued into 2015, when their new album Mystery Glue was issued. It was followed by a short international tour, after which the reunion ended.

In April 2018, Parker signed with 100% Records, and released a brand new single titled "Dreamin'". Later, in July 2018, Parker announced Cloud Symbols, his brand new studio album to be released on 21 September 2018. The album features Parker's brand new backing band The Goldtops, which consists of Martin Belmont on guitar, Geraint Watkins on keyboards, Simon Edwards on bass, and Roy Dodds on drums. The album also features the Rumour Brass, making this their first appearance on a Graham Parker album since Stick to Me in 1977 and their first time working with Parker since the Squeezing Out Sparks tour in 1979. The album was initially to be produced by Neil Brockbank, but he died during the recording of the album and production duties for the rest of the album were passed onto Tuck Nelson and Parker himself.

He announced a solo, acoustic 40th Anniversary version of Squeezing Out Sparks, for an 13 April 2019 release. It also contains the non-album single, "Mercury Poisoning".

In September 2023, Graham Parker & the Goldtops released a new studio album titled Last Chance to Learn the Twist. The Goldtops lineup now included drummer Jim Russell in place of Roy Dodds.

== Discography ==
=== Albums ===
Year	Artist credit	Album title	Peak chart positions			
Year	Artist credit	Album title	AUS	UK	CAN	US
1976	Graham Parker & the Rumour	Howlin' Wind	–	–	–	–
1976	Graham Parker & the Rumour	Heat Treatment	–	52	–	169
1977	Graham Parker & the Rumour	Stick to Me	35	19	–	125
1979	Graham Parker & the Rumour	Squeezing Out Sparks	22	18	79	40
1980	Graham Parker & the Rumour	The Up Escalator	36	11	27	40
1982	Graham Parker	Another Grey Area	98	40	–	52
1983	Graham Parker	The Real Macaw	57	–	–	59
1985	Graham Parker & the Shot	Steady Nerves	–	–	82	57
1988	Graham Parker	The Mona Lisa's Sister	81	–	46	77
1989	Graham Parker	Human Soul	–	–	–	165
1991	Graham Parker	Struck by Lightning	–	–	–	131
1992	Graham Parker	Burning Questions	–	–	–	–
1995	Graham Parker	12 Haunted Episodes	–	–	–	–
1996	Graham Parker	Acid Bubblegum	–	–	–	–
2001	Graham Parker	Deepcut to Nowhere	–	–	–	–
2004	Graham Parker	Your Country	–	–	–	–
2005	Graham Parker & the Figgs	Songs of No Consequence	–	–	–	–
2007	Graham Parker	Don't Tell Columbus	–	–	–	–
2009	Graham Parker	Carp Fishing On Valium	–	–	–	–
2010	Graham Parker	Imaginary Television	–	–	–	–
2012	Graham Parker & the Rumour	Three Chords Good	–	–	–	–
2015	Graham Parker & the Rumour	Mystery Glue	–	–	–	–
2018	Graham Parker & the Goldtops	Cloud Symbols	–	–	–	–
2019	Graham Parker	Squeezing Out Sparks Solo Acoustic 40th Anniversary	–	–	–	–
2023	Graham Parker & the Goldtops	Last Chance to Learn the Twist	–	–	–	–
"–" denotes releases that did not chart or were not released in that territory.

==== EPs ====
- Graham Parker & The Rumour

The Pink Parker EP (1977) – UK Singles Chart No. 24

- Graham Parker

Graham Parker's Christmas Cracker EP, 1994
Five Loose Screws EP, 2007

==== Outtakes, demos, rarities, etc. ====
- Loose Monkeys (outtakes), 1999
- That's When You Know (1976 demos + Live at Marble Arch), 2001
- The Official Art Vandelay Tapes (b-sides, rare tracks, outtakes, etc.), 2003
- The Official Art Vandelay Tapes, Vol. 2 (b-sides, rare tracks, outtakes, etc.), 2005
- The Middlesex Demos (1973-75 demos), 2022

=== Live albums ===
Graham Parker & the Rumour

- Live at Marble Arch, 1976
- At the Palladium, New York, NY, 1977
- The Parkerilla (1978) UK No. 14, US No. 149, AUS No. 22
- Live Sparks, 1979
- Live in San Francisco 1979, 2009
- Live Alone at the Freight & Salvage, 2012
- Official Bootleg Box, 2014

Graham Parker

- Live! Alone in America, 1989 (Recorded live in Philadelphia, October 1988)
- Live Alone! Discovering Japan, 1993
- Live from New York, 1996
- BBC Live in Concert (compilation 1977–91), 1996
- The Last Rock and Roll Tour, 1997 (with the Figgs)
- Not If It Pleases Me (BBC sessions 1976–77), 1998
- King Biscuit Flower Hour Presents Graham Parker (live 1983), 2003
- Live Cuts from Somewhere, 2003 (with the Figgs)
- Blue Highway, 2003 (Recorded live in Grant Park, Chicago, Illinois, on 4 July 1988)
- !Live Alone: The Bastard of Belgium, 2005
- Yer Cowboy Boot, 2005
- 103 Degrees in June, 2006 (with the Figgs)
- Platinum Bastard, 2007
- Live Alone at the Freight & Salvage, 2011
- Five Old Souls: Live in Southampton, 2021 (with the Gold Tops and the Rumour Brass)

=== Compilation albums ===
- The Best of Graham Parker and the Rumour 1980
- Look Back in Anger: Classic Performances, 1982
- Historia de la musica rock: Graham Parker and the Rumour, 1982
- It Don't Mean a Thing If It Ain't Got That Swing, 1984
- Pourin' It All Out: The Mercury Years, 1986
- The Best of Graham Parker 1988–1991, 1992
- Passion Is No Ordinary Word: The Graham Parker Anthology 1993
- No Holding Back, 1996
- Vertigo Compilation
- Temporary Beauty, 1997
- Stiffs & Demons
- Master Hits, 1999
- The Ultimate Collection
- You Can't Be Too Strong: An Introduction to Graham Parker and the Rumour, 2001
- Don't Ask Me Questions: The Best of Graham Parker & the Rumour (1976–1979), 2014

=== Tribute album appearances ===
- Beat The Retreat - Songs By Richard Thompson, 1995 (song: "The Madness Of Love")
- A Fair Forgery of Pink Floyd, 2003 (song: Pink Floyd's "Comfortably Numb")
- Lost Songs Of Lennon & McCartney - From A Window, 2003 (Parker sings lead on five tracks)
- The Beautiful Old, 2013 (song: "The Daring Young Man on the Flying Trapeze")

=== Singles ===
Year	Title	Chart positions						Album
Year	Title	UK	AUS	CAN	US	US Main	US Mod	Album
1976	"Silly Thing"	–	–	–	–	–	–	Howlin' Wind
1976	"Soul Shoes"	–	–	–	–	–	–	Howlin' Wind
1976	"Hotel Chambermaid"	–	–	–	–	–	–	Heat Treatment
1976	"Heat Treatment"	–	–	–	–	–	–	Heat Treatment
1977	"Pourin' It All Out"	–	–	–	–	–	–	Heat Treatment
1977	"Hold Back the Night"	24	–	–	58	–	–	The Pink Parker
1977	"(Let Me Get) Sweet on You"	24	–	–	107	–	–	The Pink Parker
1978	"The New York Shuffle"	–	49	–	–	–	–	Stick to Me
1978	"The Heat in Harlem"/"Stick to Me"	–	–	–	–	–	–	Stick to Me
1978	"Hey Lord, Don't Ask Me Questions"	32	24	–	–	–	–	The Parkerilla
1979	"Mercury Poisoning"	–	–	–	–	–	–	Non-album single
1979	"Protection"	–	46	–	–	–	–	Squeezing Out Sparks
1979	"Discovering Japan"	–	–	–	–	–	–	Squeezing Out Sparks
1979	"Local Girls"	–	–	–	–	–	–	Squeezing Out Sparks
1979	"I Want You Back (Alive)"	–	46	–	103	–	–	Non-album single
1980	"Stupefaction"	–	–	–	–	–	–	The Up Escalator
1980	"Love Without Greed"	–	–	–	–	–	–	The Up Escalator
1980	"No Holding Back"/"Endless Night"	–	–	–	–	–	–	The Up Escalator
1982	"Temporary Beauty"	50	–	–	–	52	–	Another Grey Area
1982	"You Hit the Spot"	–	–	–	–	42	–	Another Grey Area
1983	"Life Gets Better"	–	35	–	94	–	–	The Real Macaw
1985	"Break Them Down"	–	–	–	–	–	–	Steady Nerves
1985	"Wake Up (Next to You)"	–	–	94	39	19	–	Steady Nerves
1988	"Get Started. Start a Fire"	–	–	85	–	23	–	The Mona Lisa's Sister
1988	"Don't Let It Break You Down"	–	–	–	–	–	27	The Mona Lisa's Sister
1989	"Big Man on Paper"	–	–	–	–	–	18	Human Soul
"–" denotes releases that did not chart or were not released in that territory.
