= Bob Andrews (keyboardist) =

English musician (1949–2025)

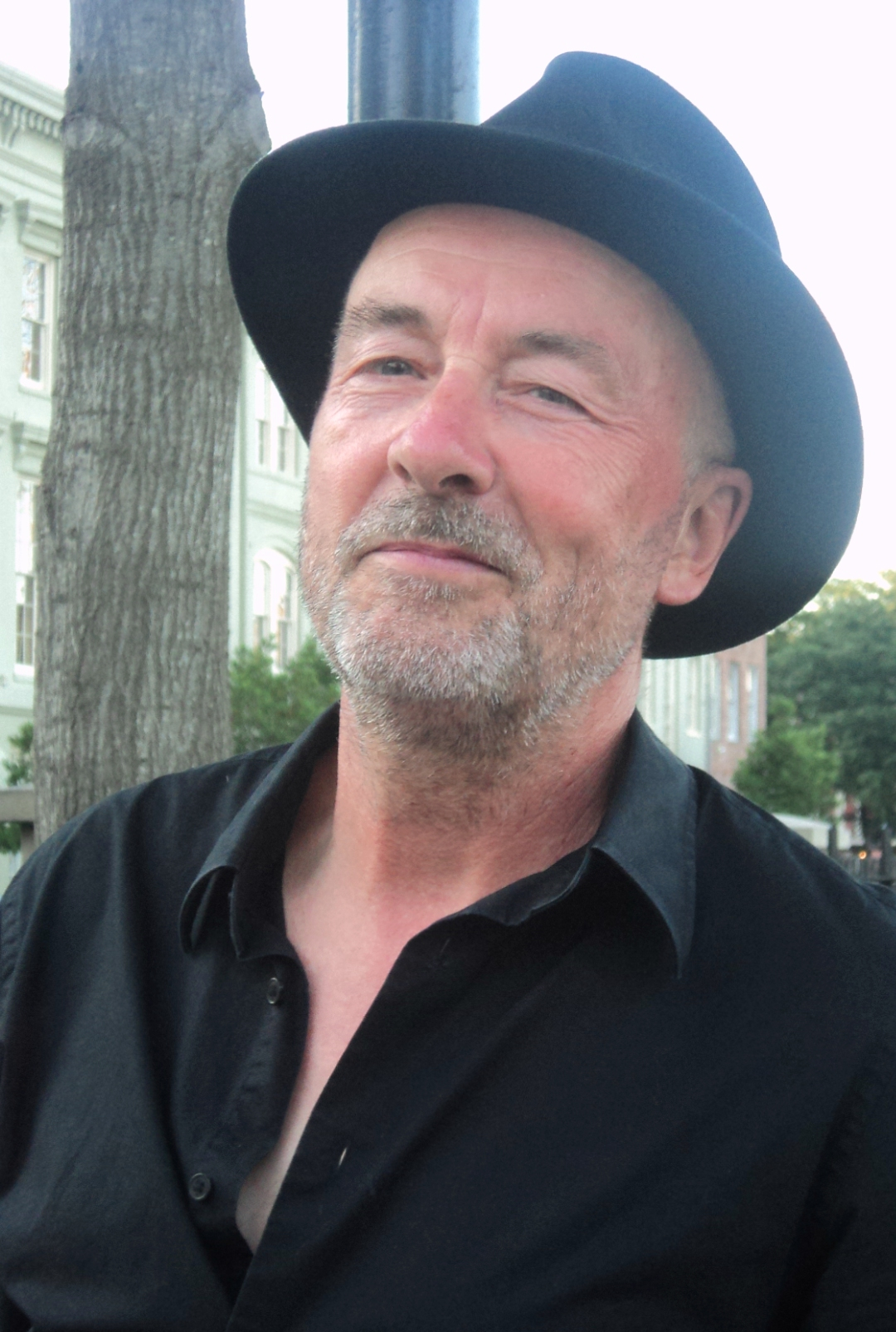
- Andrews in New Orleans, 2013

Background information
- Born: Robert Charles Andrews; 20 June 1949; Leeds, Yorkshire, England
- Died: 5 June 2025 (aged 75) Taos, New Mexico, U.S.
- Genres: Rock; new wave; soul; rhythm and blues
- Occupation: Musician; producer; songwriter
- Instruments: Hammond organ; piano; vocals; bass; guitar
- Years active: 1966–2025
- Formerly of: The Rumour; Brinsley Schwarz
- Website: neworleanspiano.com

Robert Charles Andrews (20 June 1949 – 5 June 2025) was an English keyboardist and record producer.

== Early life ==
Bob Andrews was born in England, just outside Leeds, Yorkshire.

== Brinsley Schwarz: 1969–1975 ==
The band Brinsley Schwarz came to be known by a wider public audience as the musicians central to a giant publicity stunt involving flying 120 British journalists to New York's famed Fillmore East to watch their show. The stunt turned into a disaster and left the band in debt, but it galvanised them together, and moving to a large house in the outskirts of London, they added a fifth member, and toured continuously throughout the early seventies, including playing many free shows for good and sometimes dubious causes and supporting Paul McCartney and Wings on the Red Rose Speedway tour.

== Graham Parker and the Rumour: 1975–1979 ==
The Brinsleys, as they were affectionately known, broke up in April 1975. Andrews and Schwarz together with guitarist Martin Belmont from the recently defunct Ducks Deluxe met up at the Hope and Anchor and decided to form a new band. Martin knew a bass player and drummer, Andrew Bodnar and Steve Goulding, whose band BonTemps Roulez had also split up. They started to rehearse down at the Newlands Tavern in Peckham, London and called themselves The Rumour, after the song by The Band. Dave Robinson, soon to be Stiff Records impresario and former Brinsleys manager, introduced them to Graham Parker and Parker also started rehearsing with them at the Tavern. A decision was made to keep the two acts separate for contractual purposes − publishing and record deals − and the band recorded a live record "at Marble Arch" and the first Graham Parker record, Howlin' Wind, at the end of 1975, and at the beginning of 1976, the combo hit the road.

== Production years: 1978–1991 ==
During his latter time with the Rumour, Andrews started producing. In 1978, he co-produced with Brinsley Schwarz, the first album from Carlene Carter. In 1979, Stiff Records boss Dave Robinson, who managed Andrews sporadically throughout the 1970s, enlisted Andrews as producer for Stiff artist Jona Lewie. This partnership produced, among other recordings, "Stop the Cavalry", which reached the No. 3 position in the UK Singles Chart in December 1980. The song also charted in twelve other countries. Actually an anti-war song, “Cavalry” included the line “I wish I was at home for Christmas.” When coupled with its seasonal release (and the production's subtle use of sleigh bells) it contributed to the song's perception as a Christmas song, and it remains a widely requested seasonal favourite in the UK. Andrews also produced Tenpole Tudor.

The success of "Stop the Cavalry" introduced an era of varied, often eccentric Andrews productions in the early 1980s. Between 1984 and 1986, together with new production partner Colin Fairley and enigmatic manager, Jake Riviera, Andrews worked on several top twenty singles including “Young at Heart”, by Scotland's The Bluebells, a top ten and eventual number one U.K. smash.

In 1988, with a new manager, Pete Hawkins, Andrews was recruited for production work with Lee Mavers and his band, The La's. Although he never got the chance to finish their album, his production of their song "There She Goes" cracked the Billboard top fifty, has been featured in innumerable films, and became an enduring staple and jangle pop classic. During this time, Andrews also produced tracks for artists like Katrina and the Waves and Helen Watson.

In addition to his success as a producer, he was in constant demand as a session player. He played on Maxine Nightingale's 1975 hit "Right Back Where We Started From." His angular jazz inflected piano playing was a highlight of his friend and former bandmate Nick Lowe's hit "I Love the Sound of Breaking Glass" in 1977; and his Hammond organ solo was featured on Sam Brown's hit "Stop," from 1986.

== Death ==
Andrews died at his home in New Mexico on 5 June 2025, at the age of 75.
