= Martin Belmont =

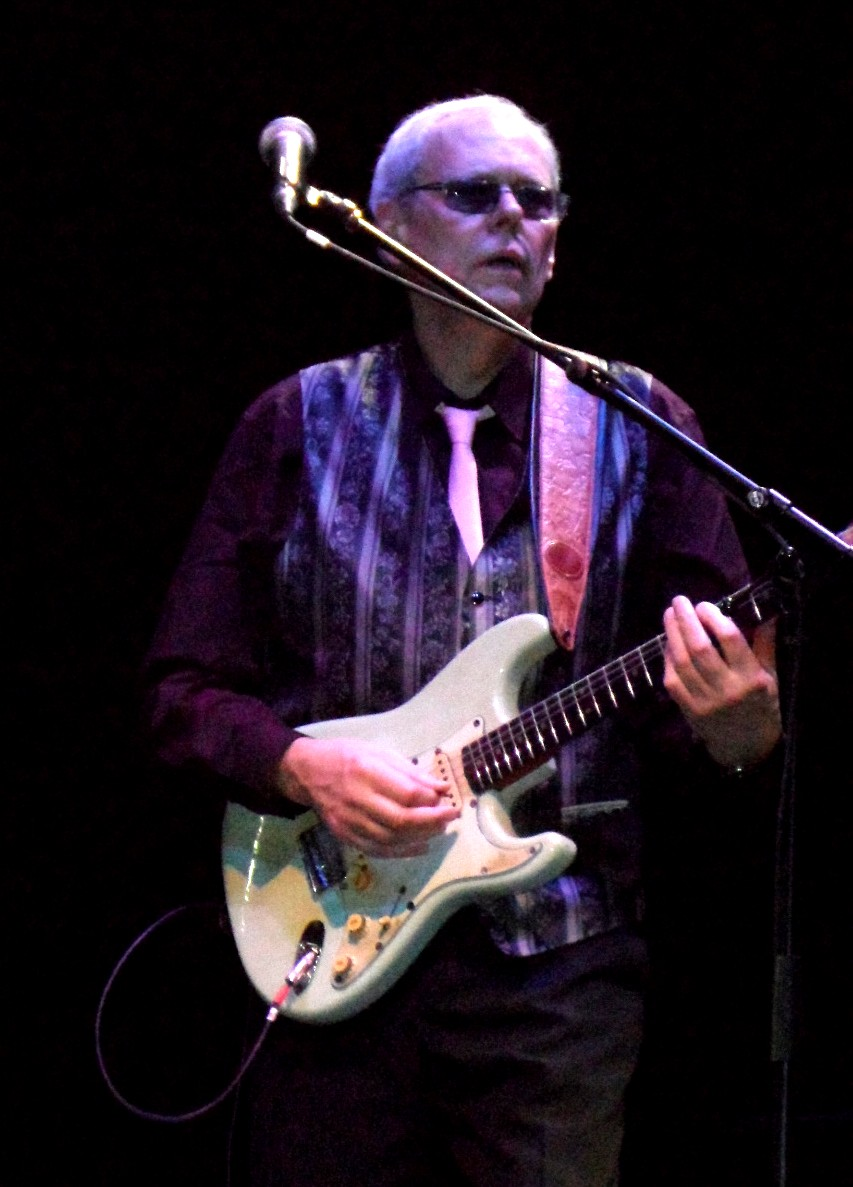

Background information
- Born: 21 December 1948 (age 77); Bromley, Kent, England
- Genres: Rock, new wave, pub rock, soul, rhythm and blues
- Instrument: Guitar
- Years active: 1970s–present
- Website: grahamparker.net

Martin Belmont (born 21 December 1948) is an English rock and country-blues guitarist.

== Life and career ==
Belmont was born in Bromley, Kent, England. After working as a roadie for Brinsley Schwarz, in 1972 he formed Ducks Deluxe, issuing two albums on RCA. In 1975 he was a founding member of Graham Parker and the Rumour, who released six albums, and of The Rumour who recorded another three on their own. Then he spent two years from 1980 as guitarist for Carlene Carter, succeeded by five years with Nick Lowe & His Cowboy Outfit, in both line-ups playing alongside Paul Carrack.

Belmont continued as an in-demand sideman across a wide spectrum of music, with sessions for Elvis Costello, Billy Bragg, Carl Perkins, Jona Lewie, John Hiatt, Desmond Decker, Johnny Cash, Eddie Grundy and others.

In 1995, Demon Records issued his first solo album, Big Guitar. His first manager and old friend Dave Robinson then suggested he should invite former bandmates to provide vocals on his next recording, resulting in Belmont recording songs with Carrack, Nick Lowe, Carlene Carter, Graham Parker, Sean Tyla, Geraint Watkins, Hank Wangford, Johnny Nicky, Barbara Marsh and Reg Meuross. Much of the album The Guest List was recorded at Goldtop Studio, with a 'house band' featuring Roy Dodds, Kevin Foster and Howard Hughes. The album was released on Goldtop Recordings/Jungle Records in September 2009 with a launch concert at Dingwalls, Camden featuring performances by most of the album's guest singers.

Currently, Belmont is playing in Los Pistoleros, The Johnny Nicky Band, Hank Wangford, My Darling Clementine and The Lost Cowboys and the newly reformed Ducks Deluxe.

== Solo discography ==
Big Guitar (Demon Records FMCD3, 1995)

- 1. The Man In Black
- 2. Beans For Breakfast
- 3. Mexican Rose
- 4. Jurassic Jive
- 5. Rockin' Hawk
- 6. Bonton Roulez
- 7. The West Texas Fender Bender
- 8. Jalisco
- 9. Ring of Fire
- 10. The Cumberland Valley Railroad
- 11. The Rattler
- 12. Howlin' For My Baby

The Guest List (Gold Top Recordings AU79CD003, 2009)

- 1. My Baby's Gone (with Paul Carrack)
- 2. Time for the Sun to Rise (with Johnny Nicky)
- 3. A Man in Love (original version, with Nick Lowe)
- 4. Johnny Too Bad (with Sean Tyla)
- 5. Seven Curses (with Reg Meuross)
- 6. Island of Dreams (with Geraint Watkins)
- 7. Get Rhythm
- 8. Tall Lover Man (with Carlene Carter)
- 9. Alison
- 10. In the Midnight Hour (with Graham Parker)
- 11. Waltzing with Sin (with Hank Wangford)
- 12. I Viberate
- 13. Beyond the Blue Horizon (with Barbara Marsh)
