= Steve Goulding =

English drummer

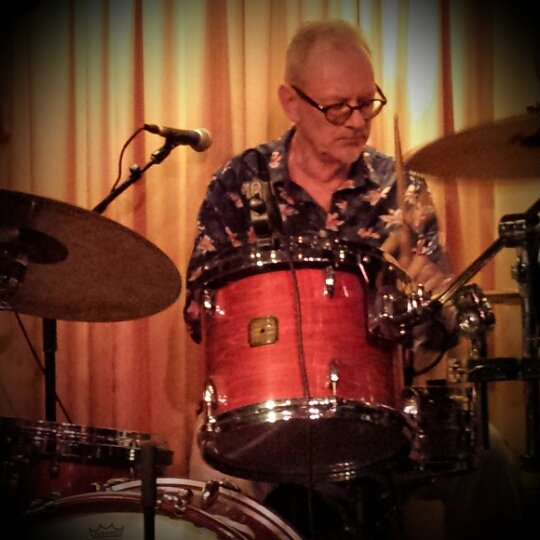
- Steve Goulding performing with the Mekons at the Hideout, Chicago, Illinois, on 13 July 2015

Background information
- Born: 1954 (age 70–71); London, England
- Genres: Rock; new wave; pub rock; soul; R&B
- Instrument: Drums
- Years active: 1970s–present
- Website: grahamparker.net

Steve Goulding (born 1954) is an English drummer, who has played as a member of Graham Parker and the Rumour, the Associates, Poi Dog Pondering, the Waco Brothers, Sally Timms and the Drifting Cowgirls and the Mekons. He also played the drums on the hit singles "Let's Go to Bed" by the Cure and "Watching the Detectives" with Elvis Costello. He co-wrote "I Love the Sound of Breaking Glass" with Nick Lowe and Andrew Bodnar. He lives in New York City.
