= The Rumour =

British rock band

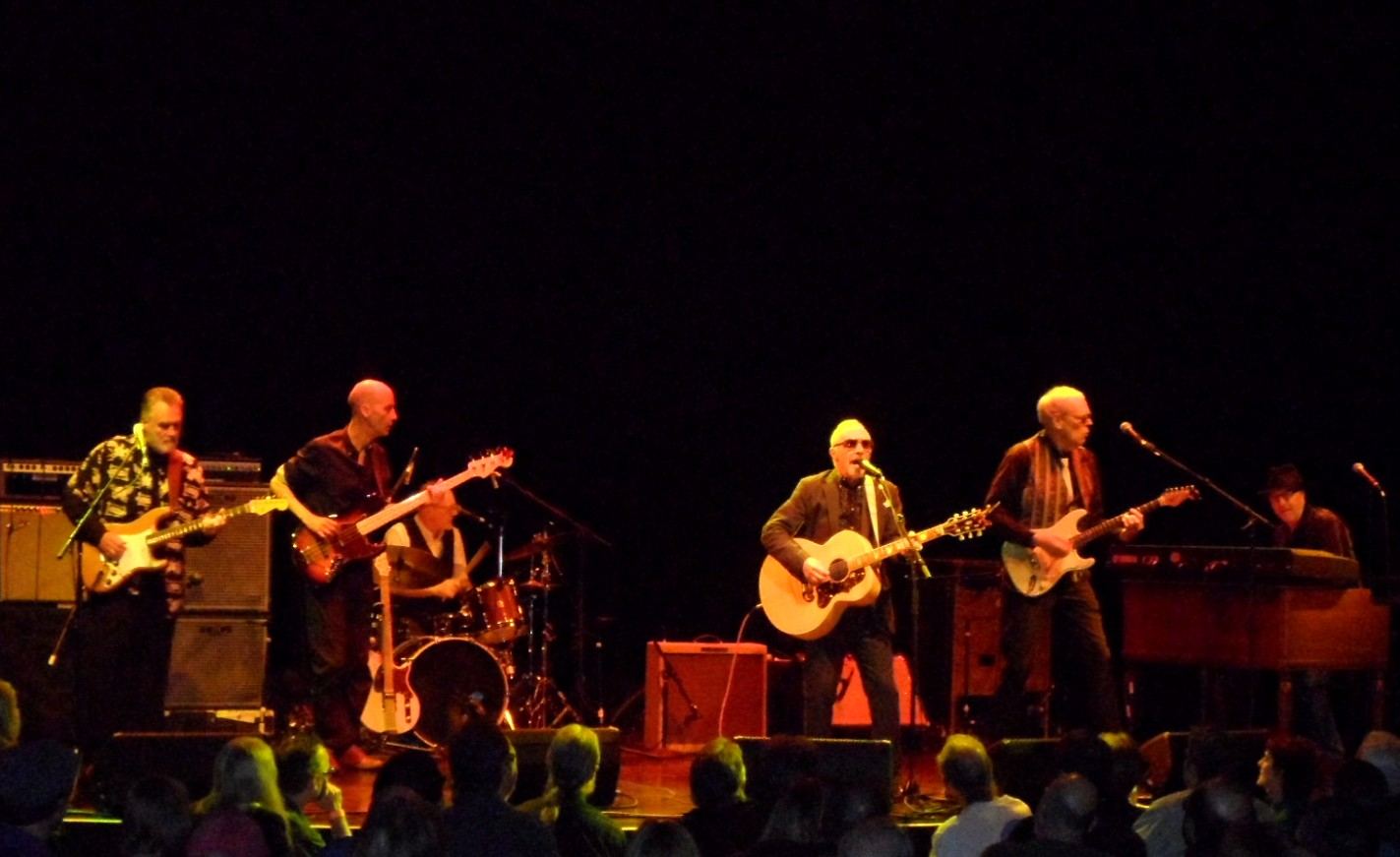
- The Rumour performing in 2012

Background information
- Origin: London, England
- Genres: Rock, new wave, pub rock, rhythm and blues, reggae
- Years active: 1976–1981, 2011–2015
- Labels: Vertigo, Mercury, Arista, Stiff, Hannibal
- Past members: Bob Andrews; Brinsley Schwarz; Martin Belmont; Andrew Bodnar; Stephen Goulding

The Rumour were an English pub rock band active in the late 1970s and early 1980s, formed with musicians from disbanded pub rock groups including Brinsley Schwarz and Ducks Deluxe. They are best known as the backup band for Graham Parker, whose early records (from 1976 to 1980) were credited to Graham Parker & the Rumour. However, the Rumour also recorded on their own, releasing three albums: Max (1977), Frogs, Sprouts, Clogs and Krauts (1979), and Purity of Essence (1980).

The group broke up at the end of 1980, but reunited as Parker's backing band in 2011. The band undertook a short final UK tour in October 2015, finishing with a final concert at the London Forum on 17 October 2015. At this show, the surviving members of the horn section also reunited, for the first time in 33 years.

== History ==
Members of the Rumour came from the veteran UK pub rock bands Brinsley Schwarz, Ducks Deluxe and Bontemps Roulez. Throughout most of their existence (1975–1980), the Rumour consisted of founding members Bob Andrews (keyboards), Brinsley Schwarz (guitar), Martin Belmont (guitar), Andrew Bodnar (bass), and Stephen Goulding (drums). Lead vocals were shared amongst all group members.

The Rumour debuted on disc as Graham Parker's backing band on his 1976 album Howlin' Wind. While continuing to work with Parker (and to receive billing on his albums), the following year the Rumour began to issue their own recordings, starting with the 1977 album Max (a reply to Fleetwood Mac for calling their latest album Rumours). 1979 saw the band showcase their mastery of the new wave sound with Frogs, Sprouts, Clogs and Krauts, a commentary on European society.

The Rumour were noted for their hard driving, skilled, tightly arranged ensemble playing. They have been compared to the Band and the Rolling Stones, frequently recalling both simultaneously. Together with Parker they recorded several albums, most notably 1979's Squeezing Out Sparks.

Members of the Rumour (often, but not always, acting as a unit) also kept themselves busy during this era appearing as session musicians on various recordings issued by acts associated with pub rock and new wave. At various points, and on various recordings, the Rumour backed Nick Lowe, Dave Edmunds, Carlene Carter and other acts. In 1977, Bodnar and Goulding also played bass and drums respectively, on Elvis Costello's first UK chart hit, "Watching the Detectives". The band also backed Garland Jeffreys on the tour for his Escape Artist album.

Feeling that their work was overlooked due to their image as Graham Parker's backing band, an album was planned for release as the Duplicates. However, the idea was ultimately shelved after the release of the single "I Want to Make You Very Happy / Call of the Faithful". Andrews subsequently left the group during 1979, with session musician Nicky Hopkins playing piano subsequently. The remaining quartet continued on, recording their own album Purity of Essence (1980) and serving as the backing band on Graham Parker's The Up Escalator (1980) before breaking up by 1981. Bodnar said of the band's breakup:

I suppose there was no single reason, but really we had nowhere else to go. When The Up Escalator was recorded, Bob was no longer in the band, and that late, lovely man, Nicky Hopkins, was playing keyboards for us. We did various shows which I can't remember, and although we didn't know it at the time, ended our career as Graham Parker & The Rumour in Essen, Germany at what I'm pleased to say was a brilliant gig, supporting the Police and, happily, broadcast live across Europe on TV! It was a great one to finish with, and the commercially unavailable video proves it!

Life trundled on and we did various gigs and festivals as the Rumour, but by mutual agreement, we were no longer playing with Graham. Later in 1981, the Garland Experience was finished - after we came offstage at the last gig in San Francisco, Stephen calmly said "I think we should split...". Poor Alan Frey, our US manager, was really upset and kept asking Steve to think about it, and that we could carry on. Actually, the rest of us knew Steve had vocalised what had been obvious for some months. So it wasn't a case of persuading him otherwise - we already agreed, reluctantly or not. But it was a sad time for us because we’d been such a good band for a while back there…

Bodnar died in 2026.

== Post-Rumour careers ==
All of the former members of the Rumour worked fairly frequently as session musicians in the years following the Rumour's demise. Schwarz, Bodnar and Goulding all worked with Parker at various times since the Rumour's break-up, and Belmont has appeared on recordings by Elvis Costello and Nick Lowe. Goulding has also been a member of the Mekons since 1984.

A compilation album of Rumour material (from their last two albums only) was released by Metro in 2000, entitled Not So Much a Rumour, More a Way of Life.

== Reunion ==
On 21 October 2010, Parker, Andrews, Belmont, Goulding, and bassist Jeremy Chatzky performed together under the name Kippington Lodge Social Club, at a preview screening of Don't Ask Me Questions, a documentary about Parker. The following spring all five original members joined Parker to record a new album, entitled Three Chords Good, and in September 2011 Parker and the Rumour filmed a performance scene for the Judd Apatow film This Is 40. The album was released in November 2012. Music journalist Stephen Thomas Erlewine noted that the release was "the rare reunion that simultaneously looks back while living in the present."

== Discography ==
- Max (1977), Mercury Records
- Frogs Sprouts Clogs and Krauts (1979), Stiff Records (UK)/Arista (US)
- Purity of Essence (1980), Stiff Records (UK)/Hannibal Records (US) - note that the track listings and performances of the UK and US editions of this album differ significantly
