= Just Can't Get Enough: New Wave Hits of the '80s =

Compilation album series

Just Can't Get Enough: New Wave Hits of the '80s is a series of compilations issued by Rhino Records, on both CD and audio cassette, featuring various artists from the new wave era 1977–1985.

The series contained 15 volumes. The first five were released on 21 June 1994, and concentrated mostly on music issued between 1977 and 1981, with a few tracks from 1982. (Despite the "New Wave Hits of the '80s" subtitle, Volume 1 actually contains no tracks from the 1980s; tracks from 1980 and later begin appearing midway through Volume 2.) Volumes 6–10 were issued on 18 October 1994, and mostly featured songs from 1982, spilling a little into 1983. The last five volumes were issued on 20 June 1995, and featured songs covering 1983 to 1985. Additional themed volumes—New Wave Dance Hits, New Wave Women, New Wave Halloween, and New Wave Xmas—came out in subsequent years. Rhino Records discontinued the series, due to rights issues and with no plans to re-release them. Many of the songs in the series are mastered from the 7-inch single masters. The series includes some songs making their first CD appearance (in some rare cases, their only CD appearance).

== Volume 1 ==
The first volume was released on both CD [R2 71694] and audio cassette on 21 June 1994.

No.	Title	Artist	Length
1.	"Ça plane pour moi"	Plastic Bertrand	3:01
2.	"Warm Leatherette"	The Normal	3:23
3.	"One Way or Another"	Blondie	3:29
4.	"Hey St. Peter"	Flash and the Pan	3:54
5.	"Cruel to Be Kind"	Nick Lowe	3:29
6.	"Too Young to Date"	D-Day	2:37
7.	"Local Girls"	Graham Parker	3:42
8.	"Rock 'n' Roll High School"	Ramones	2:22
9.	"My Sharona"	The Knack	4:03
10.	"Girls Talk"	Dave Edmunds	3:27
11.	"Video Killed the Radio Star"	The Buggles	3:29
12.	"I Do the Rock"	Tim Curry	4:47
13.	"Dirty Water"	The Inmates	3:04
14.	"I'm a Believer"	Tin Huey	3:15
15.	"Gidget Goes to Hell"	Suburban Lawns	2:03
16.	"Money (That's What I Want)"	The Flying Lizards	2:32

== Volume 2 ==
The second volume was released on CD [R2 71695] and audio cassette on 21 June 1994. Includes liner notes by Roy Trakin.

No.	Title	Artist	Length
1.	"Pop Muzik"	M	3:24
2.	"Hit Me with Your Rhythm Stick"	Ian Dury & The Blockheads	3:43
3.	"Love Will Tear Us Apart"	Joy Division	3:27
4.	"What Does Sex Mean to Me?"	Human Sexual Response	4:54
5.	"My Mistake"	The Kingbees	2:55
6.	"The Funky Western Civilization"	Tonio K	4:12
7.	"You Won't Be Happy"	The Beat	2:22
8.	"I Don't Like Mondays"	The Boomtown Rats	3:49
9.	"I Got You"	Split Enz	3:31
10.	"Danger"	The Motels	3:27
11.	"Echo Beach"	Martha and the Muffins	3:38
12.	"Whip It"	Devo	2:41
13.	"Vienna"	Ultravox	4:40
14.	"So Long"	Fischer-Z	5:01
15.	"Away from Home"	Klark Kent	2:57
16.	"Turning Japanese"	The Vapors	3:44

== Volume 3 ==
The third volume was released on CD [R2 71696] and audio cassette on 21 June 1994.

No.	Title	Artist	Length
1.	"Cars"	Gary Numan	3:58
2.	"Private Idaho"	The B-52's	3:38
3.	"Making Plans for Nigel"	XTC	4:14
4.	"Teacher, Teacher"	Rockpile	2:36
5.	"Looking for Clues"	Robert Palmer	4:58
6.	"I Live in the City"	The Humans	3:10
7.	"Drivin'"	Pearl Harbor and the Explosions	3:44
8.	"What I Like About You"	The Romantics	2:58
9.	"88 Lines About 44 Women"	The Nails	4:40
10.	"New Toy"	Lene Lovich	3:19
11.	"Fade to Grey"	Visage	4:04
12.	"Stool Pigeon"	Kid Creole and the Coconuts	3:47
13.	"Tempted"	Squeeze	4:02
14.	"Too Much Pressure"	The Selecter	3:51
15.	"It's a Night for Beautiful Girls"	The Fools	3:55
16.	"Are You Ready for the Sex Girls?"	Gleaming Spires	4:04

== Volume 4 ==
The fourth volume was released on both CD [R2 71697] and audio cassette on 21 June 1994. Includes liner notes by Andrew Sandoval.

No.	Title	Artist	Length
1.	"Freedom of Choice"	Devo	3:24
2.	"Generals and Majors"	XTC	4:07
3.	"Switchin' to Glide"	The Kings	2:36
4.	"Up All Night"	The Boomtown Rats	3:38
5.	"The Breakup Song (They Don't Write 'Em)"	The Greg Kihn Band	2:51
6.	"Love and Loneliness"	The Motors	4:40
7.	"About the Weather"	Magazine	3:27
8.	"Precious to Me"	Phil Seymour	2:52
9.	"Girls on Film"	Duran Duran	3:31
10.	"Everywhere That I'm Not"	Translator	3:51
11.	"I Could Be Happy"	Altered Images	3:33
12.	"Working Girl"	The Members	4:10
13.	"What Do All the People Know"	The Monroes	3:30
14.	"It's Going to Happen!"	The Undertones	3:39
15.	"Ziggy Stardust"	Bauhaus	3:15
16.	"Tainted Love"	Soft Cell	2:41

== Volume 5 ==
The fifth volume was released on both CD [R2 71698] and audio cassette on 21 June 1994. The booklet included liner notes by Andy Zax.

No.	Title	Artist	Length
1.	"I Want Candy"	Bow Wow Wow	2:47
2.	"I Know What Boys Like"	The Waitresses	3:15
3.	"Kids in America"	Kim Wilde	3:29
4.	"Love Plus One"	Haircut One Hundred	3:40
5.	"Someday, Someway"	Marshall Crenshaw	2:52
6.	"Hold on to Something"	Great Buildings	3:49
7.	"Town Called Malice"	The Jam	2:57
8.	"867-5309/Jenny"	Tommy Tutone	3:48
9.	"Vacation"	The Go-Gos	3:01
10.	"Valley Girl"	Frank & Moon Zappa	3:50
11.	"I Ran (So Far Away)"	A Flock of Seagulls	3:46
12.	"Sex Dwarf"	Soft Cell	5:16
13.	"I Love a Man in Uniform"	Gang of Four	3:35
14.	"The Art of Parties"	Japan	4:12
15.	"Homosapien"	Pete Shelley	3:24
16.	"Mickey"	Toni Basil	3:26

== Volume 6 ==
The sixth volume was released on 18 October 1994 on CD [R2 71699] and audio cassette. The booklet included liner notes by Andy Zax. The CD includes Code Blue's "Face to Face" and Any Trouble's "Second Choice" as bonus tracks.

No.	Title	Artist	Length
1.	"Who Can It Be Now?"	Men at Work	3:24
2.	"Twilight Zone"	Golden Earring	4:53
3.	"Talk Talk"	Talk Talk	3:24
4.	"Johnny, Are You Queer?"	Josie Cotton	2:49
5.	"White Girl"	X	3:34
6.	"People Who Died"	Jim Carroll Band	5:02
7.	"Face to Face"	Code Blue	3:05
8.	"Wot?"	Captain Sensible	3:20
9.	"Numbers with Wings"	The Bongos	4:28
10.	"The Look of Love, Pt. 1"	ABC	3:33
11.	"Do You Really Want to Hurt Me"	Culture Club	4:23
12.	"Never Say Never"	Romeo Void	3:29
13.	"The Unguarded Moment"	The Church	3:11
14.	"Second Choice"	Any Trouble	3:02
15.	"A Woman's Got the Power"	The A's	3:37
16.	"I Predict"	Sparks	2:53

== Volume 7 ==
The seventh volume was released on both CD [R2 71700] and audio cassette on 18 October 1994. The booklet includes liner notes by Jim Green.

No.	Title	Artist	Length
1.	"Favorite Shirts (Boy Meets Girl)"	Haircut One Hundred	3:05
2.	"He Could Be the One"	Josie Cotton	2:49
3.	"I'm Shakin'"	The Blasters	2:26
4.	"Six Months in a Leaky Boat"	Split Enz	3:10
5.	"I Need You"	Paul Carrack	2:49
6.	"Love Is Just the Great Pretender"	Animal Nightlife	4:02
7.	"Ride Your Pony"	The Fleshtones	3:20
8.	"Blue Spark"	X	2:11
9.	"Pass the Dutchie"	Musical Youth	3:27
10.	"Samson and Delilah"	Bad Manners	2:57
11.	"Chicken Outlaw"	Wide Boy Awake	5:19
12.	"Da Da Da I Don't Love You You Don't Love Me Aha Aha Aha"	Trio	3:27
13.	"Party Weekend"	Joe "King" Carrasco & The Crowns	3:10
14.	"Love Shadow"	Fashion	3:43
15.	"Flaming Desire"	Bill Nelson	4:50
16.	"O Superman (For Massenet)"	Laurie Anderson	8:24

== Volume 8 ==
The eighth volume in the series, was released on both CD [R2 71701] and audio cassette on 18 October 1994. Booklet includes liner notes by Jim Fouratt. The CD included "Cath" by The Bluebells, Rachel Sweet's "Voo Doo" and Heaven 17's "(We Don't Need This) Fascist Groove Thang" as bonus tracks.

No.	Title	Artist	Length
1.	"Come On Eileen"	Dexy's Midnight Runners	4:16
2.	"Red Skies"	The Fixx	3:33
3.	"Walking in L.A."	Missing Persons	3:40
4.	"Jeopardy"	The Greg Kihn Band	3:50
5.	"She's a Beauty"	The Tubes	3:32
6.	"Cath"	The Bluebells	3:16
7.	"Voo Doo"	Rachel Sweet	3:42
8.	"If You Leave Me, Can I Come Too?"	Mental As Anything	3:15
9.	"She Blinded Me with Science"	Thomas Dolby	3:43
10.	"Mexican Radio"	Wall of Voodoo	4:00
11.	"Lies"	Thompson Twins	3:14
12.	"Whirly Girl"	OXO	3:00
13.	"Kiss Me"	Tin Tin	7:32
14.	"(We Don't Need This) Fascist Groove Thang"	Heaven 17	4:22
15.	"Escalator of Life"	Robert Hazard	3:38
16.	"Goodbye to You"	Scandal	3:48

== Volume 9 ==
The ninth volume in the series was released on both CD [R2 71702] and audio cassette on 18 October 1994. Booklet includes liner notes by Jean Rosenbluth. The CD includes Marshall Crenshaw's "Whenever You're on My Mind" and Killer Pussy's "Teenage Enema Nurses in Bondage" as bonus tracks.

No.	Title	Artist	Length
1.	"Rio"	Duran Duran	4:02
2.	"I Melt with You"	Modern English	3:51
3.	"Cool Places"	Sparks & Jane Wiedlin	3:26
4.	"Love My Way"	The Psychedelic Furs	3:41
5.	"Save It for Later"	English Beat	3:38
6.	"Whenever You're on My Mind"	Marshall Crenshaw	3:19
7.	"Keep It Tight"	Single Bullet Theory	2:42
8.	"Blister in the Sun"	Violent Femmes	2:26
9.	"The Cutter"	Echo & the Bunnymen	3:57
10.	"Sign of the Times"	The Belle Stars	2:55
11.	"Poison Arrow"	ABC	3:28
12.	"Too Shy"	Kajagoogoo	3:39
13.	"Let Me Go"	Heaven 17	4:16
14.	"Dancing in Heaven (Orbital Be-Bop)"	Q-Feel	3:08
15.	"Teenage Enema Nurses in Bondage"	Killer Pussy	4:13
16.	"I Eat Cannibals"	Total Coelo	3:33

== Volume 10 ==
The tenth volume was released on both CD [R2 71703] and audio cassette on October 18, 1994. It contains the rarely heard The Little Girls' "Earthquake Song." The CD included Rank and File's "Amanda Ruth" as a bonus track. Booklet includes liner notes by Roy Trakin (liner notes for each song are in order by the track listing, unlike the previous volumes).

No.	Title	Artist	Length
1.	"Desperate But Not Serious"	Adam Ant	3:56
2.	"Do You Wanna Hold Me?"	Bow Wow Wow	3:14
3.	"China"	Red Rockers	4:02
4.	"(Keep Feeling) Fascination"	The Human League	3:46
5.	"Beat Surrender"	The Jam	3:31
6.	"The Walls Came Down"	The Call	3:47
7.	"Amanda Ruth"	Rank and File	3:12
8.	"A Million Miles Away"	The Plimsouls	3:34
9.	"Our House"	Madness	3:26
10.	"Shy Boy (Don't It Make You Feel Good)"	Bananarama	3:17
11.	"Wishing (If I Had a Photograph of You)"	A Flock of Seagulls	4:14
12.	"Promises, Promises"	Naked Eyes	3:48
13.	"Stand By"	Roman Holliday	2:49
14.	"Whistle Down the Wind"	Nick Heyward	3:44
15.	"Earthquake Song"	The Little Girls	2:40
16.	"Puttin' on the Ritz"	Taco	3:25

== Volume 11 ==
The eleventh volume was released on both CD [R2 71974] and audio cassette on June 20, 1995. The liner notes by Andy Zax describe The Fixx inaccurately as one of the most successful new wave bands from Australia; they are in fact from England.

No.	Title	Artist	Length
1.	"In a Big Country"	Big Country	3:55
2.	"99 Luftballons"	Nena	3:55
3.	"Just Got Lucky"	JoBoxers	3:44
4.	"Jukebox (Don't Put Another Dime)"	The Flirts	3:45
5.	"Change"	Tears for Fears	4:00
6.	"Talking in Your Sleep"	The Romantics	3:57
7.	"Emotion"	DFX2	4:57
8.	"President Am I"	Slow Children	2:50
9.	"One Thing Leads to Another"	The Fixx	3:25
10.	"The Fanatic"	Felony	3:36
11.	"Shiny Shiny"	Haysi Fantayzee	3:46
12.	"Mirror Mirror (Mon Amour)"	Dollar	3:22
13.	"The Lunatics (Have Taken Over the Asylum)"	Fun Boy Three	3:14
14.	"Black Coffee in Bed"	Squeeze	4:18
15.	"Send Me an Angel"	Real Life	3:56
16.	"True"	Spandau Ballet	5:35

== Volume 12 ==
The twelfth volume was released on both CD [#R2 71975] and audio cassette on June 20, 1995. The CD contains bonus tracks including Tracey Ullman's "They Don't Know," The Rave-Up's "Positively Lost Me," Marlyn's "Calling Your Name," and Cabaret Voltaire's "Sensoria."

No.	Title	Artist	Length
1.	"Karma Chameleon"	Culture Club	4:08
2.	"It Must Be Love"	Madness	3:26
3.	"Gold"	Spandau Ballet	3:55
4.	"Come Back and Stay"	Paul Young	3:35
5.	"Oblivious"	Aztec Camera	3:13
6.	"They Don't Know"	Tracey Ullman	3:02
7.	"Positively Lost Me"	The Rave-Ups	5:09
8.	"Fields of Fire"	Big Country	3:32
9.	"(She's) Sexy & 17"	The Stray Cats	3:15
10.	"Sixty Eight Guns"	The Alarm	3:19
11.	"Our Lips Are Sealed"	Fun Boy Three	2:53
12.	"Only You"	Yaz	3:13
13.	"The Politics of Dancing"	Re-Flex	3:58
14.	"Calling Your Name"	Marilyn	4:06
15.	"Sensoria"	Cabaret Voltaire	3:58
16.	"Images of Heaven"	Peter Godwin	5:01

== Volume 13 ==
The thirteenth volume was released on both CD [#R2 71976] and audio cassette on June 20, 1995.

No.	Title	Artist	Length
1.	"Relax"	Frankie Goes to Hollywood	4:01
2.	"Dance Hall Days"	Wang Chung	4:01
3.	"Hero Takes a Fall"	The Bangles	2:55
4.	"Wouldn't It Be Good"	Nik Kershaw	4:14
5.	"Hold Me Now"	Thompson Twins	4:48
6.	"Cruel Summer"	Bananarama	3:36
7.	"Working with Fire and Steel"	China Crisis	3:40
8.	"Cleanin' Up the Town"	The BusBoys	3:00
9.	"Girls"	Dwight Twilley	3:30
10.	"The Stand (Prophecy)"	The Alarm	3:17
11.	"Free Nelson Mandela"	The Special AKA	4:08
12.	"General Public"	General Public	4:27
13.	"(Feels Like) Heaven"	Fiction Factory	3:32
14.	"Dancing with Tears in My Eyes"	Ultravox	4:10
15.	"Whisper to a Scream (Birds Fly)"	The Icicle Works	3:48
16.	"The Killing Moon"	Echo & the Bunnymen	5:46

== Volume 14 ==
The fourteenth volume was released on both CD [R2 71977] and audio cassette on June 20, 1995. The booklet includes liner notes by Brett Milano.

No.	Title	Artist	Length
1.	"Close (to the Edit)"	Art of Noise	3:54
2.	"Tenderness"	General Public	3:38
3.	"Der Kommissar"	After The Fire	4:07
4.	"Smalltown Boy"	Bronski Beat	4:06
5.	"Voices Carry"	'Til Tuesday	4:24
6.	"One Night in Bangkok"	Murray Head	4:08
7.	"Imagination"	Belouis Some	3:36
8.	"Never, Never"	The Assembly	3:47
9.	"Sunglasses at Night"	Corey Hart	3:55
10.	"Free Yourself"	The Untouchables	3:39
11.	"Every Word Means No"	Let's Active	2:53
12.	"Exception of Love"	The Truth	3:01
13.	"Can't Get Enough of You Baby"	The Colourfield	2:19
14.	"The Backyard"	Miracle Legion	4:03
15.	"Anywhere with You"	Rubber Rodeo	4:02
16.	"True Men Don't Kill Coyotes"	Red Hot Chili Peppers	3:39

== Volume 15 ==
The fifteenth volume was released on both CD [R2 71977] and audio cassette on June 20, 1995. Includes liner notes by Jean Rosenbluth.

No.	Title	Artist	Length
1.	"Walking on Sunshine"	Katrina & the Waves	4:00
2.	"Head over Heels"	Tears for Fears	4:19
3.	"It's a Mistake"	Men at Work	4:34
4.	"Life in a Northern Town"	The Dream Academy	4:18
5.	"Beat's So Lonely"	Charlie Sexton	5:18
6.	"Guitar, Talk, Love & Drums"	Gary Myrick	4:18
7.	"Since Yesterday"	Strawberry Switchblade	2:56
8.	"Obsession"	Animotion	4:04
9.	"Endicott"	Kid Creole and the Coconuts	4:29
10.	"Perfect Way"	Scritti Politti	4:06
11.	"So in Love"	Orchestral Manoeuvres in the Dark	3:31
12.	"Election Day"	Arcadia	4:34
13.	"19"	Paul Hardcastle	3:40
14.	"Why?"	Bronski Beat	3:58
15.	"Some People"	Belouis Some	4:01
16.	"Like a Virgin"	The Lords of the New Church	3:49

== Credits ==
- Compiled and produced by David McLees and Andrew Sandoval
- Sound produced by Bill Inglot
- Compilation assistance: David Kapp, Emily Cagan, Jim Neill, Brady Benton, Ken Lesnik, Joe Phiefer, Ted Myers, Gary Peterson, Gary Stewart, Chris Farman
- Project assistance: Garson Foos, Keith Altomare, Jim Neill, Steve Poltorak, Craig Kamins, Bill Inglot, Jock Elliot, Antone DeSantis, Arny Schorr, Darcy Sullvan, Stephen K. Peeles, Norma Edwards, Nancy Hopkins, Michaeal Mazzarella, Nat Brewster, Janet Grey, David Miller.
- Research: Patrick Milligan, Gary Peterson
- Remastering: Bill Inglot, Andrew Sandoval & Ken Perry
- Front cover photo: Blind Gary and Dirty Pierre Silva (Volumes 6–15 only)
- Design: Julie Vlasak (Volumes 6–15 only) and Steve Bates
- Art direction: Monster X (Volumes 6–15 only)
- Rhino New Wave Hits of the '80s Team: Keith Altomare, Steve Bates, Emily Cagan, Chris Clarke, Julie D'Angelo, David Born, Garson Foos, Teresa McGurrin, David McLees, Jim Neill, David Newberg, Mark Pinkus, Faithe Raphael
