= List of new wave artists =

The following is a list of artists and bands associated with the new wave music genre during the late 1970s and early-to-mid 1980s. The list does not include acts associated with the resurgences and revivals of the genre that have occurred from the 1990s onward. Acts associated with these revivals are found in the list of post-punk revival bands article.

Groups and artists with aliases are listed by the first letter in their name, and individuals are listed by their surname.

Note: ± indicates an inductee of the Rock and Roll Hall of Fame

== 0–9 ==
- The 77s

== A ==
- A-ha
- ABC
- Adam and the Ants
- After the Fire
- The Alarm
- The Aliens
- Alisa (early work)
- Alphaville
- Altered Images
- Animotion
- Adam Ant
- Any Trouble
- Joan Armatrading (1980s work)
- Matthew Ashman
- Associates
- The Attractions
- The Avant Gardeners
- Azra
- Aztec Camera

== B ==
- The B-52's
- B-Movie
- Baltimora
- Bananarama
- The Bangles
- Toni Basil
- Stiv Bators
- The Beat (aka the English Beat)
- Belouis Some
- ± Pat Benatar
- Berlin
- Big Country
- Big in Japan
- Bijelo Dugme
- ±Blondie
- Blotto
- The Bluebells
- Blue Peter
- Blurt
- Boa
- Book of Love
- The Boomtown Rats
- Bow Wow Wow
- Dale Bozzio
- The Brains
- Brygada Kryzys
- The Buggles
- Bulevar
- Buzzcocks

== C ==
- ±Belinda Carlisle
- Joe Carrasco
- ±The Cars
- Catholic Discipline
- A Certain Ratio
- Cetu Javu
- The Chameleons
- Chi-Pig
- China Crisis
- The Church
- ±The Clash
- Climie Fisher
- Clocks
- Cock Robin
- Lloyd Cole and the Commotions
- Comateens
- The Comsat Angels
- ±Alice Cooper (1980s work)
- ±Elvis Costello
- Josie Cotton
- Marshall Crenshaw
- The Crocodiles
- Cuddly Toys (Trial and Crosses era)
- Culture Club
- ±The Cure
- Cutting Crew

== D ==
- Étienne Daho
- Dalek I Love You
- The Danse Society
- Dead or Alive
- Decibel
- Delta 5
- ±Depeche Mode
- Jimmy Destri
- Devo
- Dexys Midnight Runners
- The Distractions
- Divinyls
- Thomas Dolby
- Doll by Doll
- The Doll
- Dr. Feelgood
- The Dream Academy
- ±Duran Duran
- Ian Dury

== E ==
- Ebn Ozn
- Echo & the Bunnymen
- Edin-Ådahl
- Električni Orgazam
- Eurogliders
- ±Eurythmics
- Everything but the Girl

== F ==
- Face to Face
- Marianne Faithfull (Broken English era)
- Fiat Lux
- Film
- Fingerprintz
- Fischer-Z
- The Fixx
- Flash and the Pan
- A Flock of Seagulls
- The Flying Lizards
- The Flys
- Fra Lippo Lippi
- Frankie Goes to Hollywood
- Freur
- Friends Again
- Robert Fripp
- Fun Boy Three

== G ==
- Gleaming Spires
- ±The Go-Go's
- Vivien Goldman
- Richard Gottehrer
- Gruppo Sportivo

== H ==
- Nina Hagen
- Haircut One Hundred
- Haustor
- Greg Hawkes
- Vanessa Briscoe Hay
- Bonnie Hayes
- Robert Hazard
- Heaven 17
- Nona Hendryx
- John Hiatt (Slug Line era)
- Hipsway
- James Honeyman-Scott
- The Human League
- Human Sexual Response

== I ==
- Icehouse
- Ideal
- Billy Idol
- Idoli
- Images in Vogue
- Indochine
- INXS

== J ==
- Joe Jackson
- The Jam
- Japan
- ±Billy Joel (Glass Houses era)
- Matt Johnson
- Grace Jones
- Howard Jones
- Joy Division

== K ==
- Kajagoogoo
- KaS Product
- Nik Kershaw
- King
- King Crimson (Discipline/Beat/Three of a Perfect Pair era)
- The Knack
- Kombi
- Kora
- Kult

== L ==
- Lady Pank
- Laki Pingvini
- Annabel Lamb
- Robin Lane (early 1980s work)
- Clive Langer
- Peter Laughner
- Cyndi Lauper
- The League of Gentlemen
- Thomas Leer
- Level 42
- Jona Lewie
- Leyton Buzzards
- Litfiba
- The Little Girls
- The Lotus Eaters
- Lene Lovich
- Nick Lowe
- Luna

== M ==
- M
- Kirsty MacColl
- Madness
- Martha and the Muffins
- Moon Martin
- Men at Work
- Men Without Hats
- The Method Actors
- The Mood
- Modern Talking
- Hilly Michaels
- Midnight Oil (early work)
- Mi-Sex
- Ministry (early work)
- Missing Persons
- Milan Mladenović
- The MO
- Models
- Modern English
- The Monochrome Set
- The Motels
- Mark Mothersbaugh

== N ==
- Naked Eyes
- Nautilus Pompilius
- The Neats
- Nena
- The Nerves
- Nervus Rex
- New Order
- Nikki & The Corvettes
- Nine Circles
- Klaus Nomi
- The Normal
- Gary Numan
- Terri Nunn
- The Nuns

== O ==
- Hazel O'Connor
- Oingo Boingo
- One to One
- Yoko Ono
- Option 30
- Orange Juice
- Orchestral Manoeuvres in the Dark

== P ==
- P-Model
- The Pale Fountains
- Robert Palmer (Clues era)
- Paraf
- Graham Parker
- Pearl Harbor and the Explosions
- Pere Ubu
- Perfect
- Peter Perrett
- Pet Shop Boys
- The Photos
- Plastic Bertrand
- Plastics
- Platinum Blonde
- Pointed Sticks
- ±The Police
- Polyrock
- Pražský výběr
- Prefab Sprout
- ±The Pretenders
- Prljavo kazalište
- The Psychedelic Furs
- Pukka Orchestra
- Pylon

== R ==
- Re-Flex
- Real Life
- Red Rockers
- Republika
- Rockpile
- Romeo Void
- ±Linda Ronstadt (Mad Love era)
- The Room
- ±Roxy Music
- Darko Rundek

== S ==
- Šarlo Akrobata
- Secret Service
- Seona Dancing
- The Sharks
- Sigue Sigue Sputnik
- Simple Minds
- The Sinceros
- Single Bullet Theory
- Siouxsie and the Banshees
- Shandi Sinnamon
- Skids
- ±Robert Smith
- Sniff 'n' the Tears
- The Soft Boys
- Jimmy Somerville
- The Sound
- Spandau Ballet
- The Specials
- Ronnie Spector (Siren era)
- Spider Murphy Gang
- Spizzenergi
- Spliff
- Split Enz
- Spoons
- Squeeze
- ±Sting
- La Strada
- Strange Advance
- The Stranglers
- Strawberry Switchblade
- Jura Stublić
- Johnny Štulić
- Suburban Lawns
- The Suburbs
- ±Donna Summer (1980s work)
- The Swimming Pool Q's

== T ==
- Talk Talk
- ±Talking Heads
- Taxi Girl
- The Teardrop Explodes
- Tears for Fears
- The Telefones
- Television
- Ten Ten
- Termiti
- Thompson Twins
- 'Til Tuesday
- Tin Huey
- Jun Togawa
- Tom Tom Club
- Tonio K
- Toto Coelo
- Toy Love
- Translator
- Izabela Trojanowska
- Tubeway Army
- Tuxedomoon

== U ==
- Ultravox
- The Units
- Urban Verbs

== V ==
- The Vapors
- Videosex
- Village People (Renaissance era)

== W ==
- The Waitresses
- Wall of Voodoo
- Wang Chung
- When in Rome
- Kim Wilde
- The Wild Swans
- Toyah Willcox
- Gary Wilson

== X ==
- XTC

== Y ==
- Yachts
- Yazoo

== See also ==
- List of post-punk bands
- List of synthpop artists
