= Valley Girl (1983 film) =

1983 film by Martha Coolidge

- Theatrical release poster
- Directed by: Martha Coolidge
- Written by: Wayne Crawford; Andrew Lane
- Produced by: Wayne Crawford; Andrew Lane
- Starring: Nicolas Cage; Deborah Foreman; Elizabeth Daily; Cameron Dye; Michelle Meyrink; Lee Purcell; Richard Sanders; Colleen Camp; Frederic Forrest
- Cinematography: Frederick Elmes
- Edited by: Éva Gárdos
- Music by: Marc Levinthal; Scott Wilk
- Production companies: Valley 9000; Atlantic Releasing
- Distributed by: Atlantic Releasing
- Release date: April 29, 1983 (United States)
- Running time: 99 minutes
- Country: United States
- Language: English
- Budget: $3 million
- Box office: $17.3 million

Valley Girl is a 1983 American romantic comedy film directed by Martha Coolidge and written and produced by Wayne Crawford and Andrew Lane. Loosely based on the tragedy Romeo and Juliet by William Shakespeare, the film centers on the romance between a valley girl (Deborah Foreman) and a city punk (Nicolas Cage). Michelle Meyrink, Elizabeth Daily, Cameron Dye and Michael Bowen appear in supporting roles. Valley Girl was released in the United States on April 29, 1983, to critical and commercial success.

== Plot ==
Julie Richman is a valley girl who seems to have it all: good looks, popularity, and a handsome Valley dude boyfriend, Tommy, but she is having second thoughts about her relationship with the arrogant and selfish Tommy. At the end of a shopping trip with her friends, Loryn, Stacey, and Suzi, Julie runs into Tommy and breaks up with him. Later that day at the beach, Julie trades shy glances with a young man in the distance.

That night, at a party at Suzi's house, Julie locks eyes with Randy, a Hollywood punk who has crashed the party with his friend Fred. They hit it off, especially after Julie learns Randy was the young man at the beach. Tommy is jealous and seduces Loryn into having sex with him. Afterwards, he gets his cronies to eject Randy and Fred from the party. Undaunted, Randy sneaks back into the house and hides in an upstairs bathroom shower. Randy waits in the shower for Julie to enter the bathroom as various partygoers come and go, talking about and trying to have sex, and doing drugs. When Julie enters, Randy convinces her to leave the party with him. Julie brings a reluctant Stacey for the ride with Randy and Fred. While at Randy's favorite Hollywood nightclub, Julie and Randy rapidly grow closer as Stacey continually rebuffs Fred's advances. Julie ignores Stacey's plight and the fact that she never wanted to be there or with Fred.

Julie's friends, dismayed by her relationship with Randy, pressure her to get back together with Tommy. Julie asks her father for advice, and he kindly tells her she should follow her heart. Despite this, Julie reconciles with Tommy and dumps Randy. A heartbroken Randy gets severely drunk, has sex with his ex-girlfriend in a nightclub bathroom, and nearly gets into a fight with a gang of low riders before Fred saves him. Fred chides Randy for moping over Julie, but tells him he needs to fight if he truly wants her back. Randy flits about the Valley for the next few days just so he can get a glimpse at Julie. Fred says he has a plan that will reunite Randy with Julie as well as get revenge against Tommy.

A subplot involves Suzi and her widowed stepmother and guardian, Beth, vying for the attention of a boy named Skip. At Suzi's party, she tells Beth, who is chaperoning, about Skip, whom Suzi likes and hopes will show up. When Skip arrives, he and Beth are attracted to each other. Skip goes out of his way to see her without Suzi finding out, and Beth reciprocates his advances. One day Skip enters Suzi's house, apparently looking for Beth. He goes upstairs and sees an attractive female silhouette taking a shower. Skip and this woman, whose face is not shown, are then shown having sex. Someone arrives home and goes upstairs. The bedroom door opens, Beth enters in shock, and only then is it shown Suzi was the woman in the shower and in bed with Skip. Skip and Suzi go to the prom together.

As the girls make prom decorations, Stacey and Loryn chat over their post-prom plans. Stacey reveals Tommy made a reservation at the Valley Sheraton Hotel as an after-prom surprise for Julie.

Tommy and Julie ride to the prom in a rented stretch limousine. Randy and Fred arrive shortly after and sneak backstage. Randy increasingly becomes annoyed with watching the Valley High kids dance, but Fred assures him all is going according to plan. Julie and Tommy are escorted backstage, waiting to be introduced as king and queen of the prom. Randy confronts Tommy, and the two begin to brawl. When the prom king and queen are announced, the curtain pulls back to reveal Randy beating up Tommy. Randy knocks Tommy out, then escorts a thrilled Julie from the stage through the crowd. Tommy recovers and storms through the crowd toward Randy and Julie, who start a food fight to slow Tommy down and facilitate their escape from the venue in Tommy's rented limousine.

As the happy couple ride into the night toward the Valley Sheraton, Julie takes Tommy's ID bracelet off her wrist, which had been a sign of the relationship between the two during the entire film, and throws it out the window.

== Cast ==
- Nicolas Cage as Randy (first time credited as Nicolas Cage)
- Deborah Foreman as Julie Richman
- Elizabeth Daily as Loryn
- Michael Bowen as Tommy
- Cameron Dye as Fred Bailey
- Heidi Holicker as Stacey
- Michelle Meyrink as Suzi Brent
- Tina Theberge as Samantha
- Lee Purcell as Beth Brent, Suzi's Mother
- Richard Sanders as Drivers' Ed Teacher
- Colleen Camp as Sarah Richman, Julie's Mother
- Frederic Forrest as Steve Richman, Julie's Father

== Production ==
The film originally was conceived as a teen exploitation film to capitalize on the valley girl fad inspired by the Frank and Moon Unit Zappa song "Valley Girl". Zappa explored the possibility of making a "Valley Girl" film and received inquiries from several studios, though nothing materialized. Zappa later unsuccessfully sued to stop production of the film, claiming it infringed on his trademark.

Cage and Foreman found it difficult to do the breakup scene at Julie's front door because it was shot late in the filming when Cage and Foreman were dating. It took several takes and some counseling by Martha Coolidge. She told Foreman to think of another guy she had broken up with.

== Reception ==
=== Box office ===
Valley Girl was released on April 29, 1983, and opened in 442 theaters. In the opening weekend, it grossed $1,856,780 at No.4. The final domestic gross reached $17,343,596. Or $4.5 million in rentals. Please note figures are for rentals in US and Canada.

=== Critical reception ===
The film garnered mostly positive reviews. On Rotten Tomatoes it has an 81% rating based on reviews from 31 critics. The site's consensus states: "With engaging performances from its two leads, Valley Girl is a goofy yet amiable film that both subverts and celebrates the cheerful superficiality of teen comedies." Metacritic gave the film a score of 66 based on 10 reviews, indicating "generally favorable reviews".

== Soundtrack ==
Valley Girl (Music From The Original Motion Picture Soundtrack)

Soundtrack album by Various
- Released: 1983
- Genre: New Wave
- Label: Roadshow

The soundtrack features a host of new wave recording artists including the Psychedelic Furs as well as the Plimsouls and Josie Cotton, both of whom appeared in the film. Songs by Bonnie Hayes, Modern English, and Payolas also featured prominently.

Many of the songs used were minor chart hits in 1982–83. Josie Cotton's "Johnny Are You Queer?" was a regional hit in Southern California in 1981, placing #5 on KROQ-FM's Top 106 songs of the year and "He Could Be the One" from her album Convertible Music had reached #74 on the Billboard Hot 100 in 1982. The song heard over the opening credits is "Girls Like Me" from Bonnie Hayes' 1982 album Good Clean Fun, which "bubbled under" the Billboard 200 album chart at #206. The Plimsouls' "A Million Miles Away" and the Payolas "Eyes of a Stranger" were moderate hits in 1982, reaching #11 and #22, respectively, on Billboard's Top Tracks chart. "I Melt with You" by Modern English reached #78 on the Billboard Hot 100 in 1983.

The song "I Melt with You" occurred twice in the film: in the ending credits and in the love scene montage. Director Martha Coolidge heard it on the radio and decided it caught the spirit of the film. She had to call the staff at the station and sing it to them to find out what it was called because they didn't announce what songs were after they were played.

The end credits show songs by the Clash, Culture Club, Bananarama, and the Jam, but these songs are not heard in the film. After the film was completed, problems arose in acquiring the music rights and substitute songs had to be dubbed. Altogether the music rights cost $250,000 on top of the film's original $350,000 budget.

The planned release of a soundtrack album on Epic Records (catalog number FE 38673) was cancelled due to the clearance problems with some of the songs. Instead, a different six-song mini-album was manufactured by Roadshow Records, a one-off subsidiary of Atlantic Releasing. The album never was released commercially, but a few copies were leaked and became highly valued collector's items. More common is a counterfeit copy which is distinguished by the misspelling of the title as "Valley Girls" on the spine of the album cover.

In 1994, Rhino Records released a compilation of songs from the film's soundtrack on CD, which peaked at #155 on the Billboard 200. This was followed by a second volume titled More Music from the Valley Girl Soundtrack in 1995.

The film originally carried the song "Who Can It Be Now?" by Men at Work in the scene where Randy hides in the shower hoping Julie will come in, but in the special edition DVD release, the song "Systematic Way" by Josie Cotton carries over into the next scene. This song was not credited at the end of the movie's credit scroll. However, in the release of the Blu-Ray edition of the movie on October 30, 2018, the original song, "Who Can It Be Now?" by Men at Work, was restored to match the theatrical release.

=== Track listing ===
US mini-LP Valley Girl (Music from the Original Motion Picture Soundtrack) (Roadshow, 1983)

1. "Girls Like Me" – Bonnie Hayes with the Wild Combo
2. "Angst in My Pants" – Sparks
3. "School Is In" – Josie Cotton
4. "Everywhere at Once" – The Plimsouls
5. "Johnny Are You Queer?" – Josie Cotton
6. "Shelly's Boyfriend" – Bonnie Hayes with the Wild Combo

UK LP Valley Girl (The Original Soundtrack Album) (Avatar Communications, 1984)

1. "I Melt with You" – Modern English
2. "Girls Like Me" – Bonnie Hayes with the Wild Combo
3. "Love My Way" – The Psychedelic Furs
4. "School Is In" – Josie Cotton
5. "Everywhere at Once" – The Plimsouls
6. "Who Can It Be Now?" – Men at Work
7. "Shelly's Boyfriend" – Bonnie Hayes with the Wild Combo
8. "She Talks to Me in Stereo" – Gary Myrick
9. "Johnny Are You Queer?" – Josie Cotton

CD Valley Girl (Music from the Soundtrack) (Rhino, 1994)

1. "A Million Miles Away" – The Plimsouls – 3:44
2. "Johnny, Are You Queer?" – Josie Cotton – 2:46
3. "Eyes of a Stranger" – Payola$ – 3:33
4. "Angst in My Pants" – Sparks – 3:30
5. "Who Can It Be Now?" – Men at Work – 3:23
6. "Everywhere at Once" – The Plimsouls – 3:19
7. "I La La La Love You" – Pat Travers' Black Pearl – 3:37
8. "He Could Be the One" – Josie Cotton – 2:48
9. "Love My Way" – The Psychedelic Furs – 3:40
10. "Jukebox (Don't Put Another Dime)" – The Flirts – 3:45
11. "The Fanatic" – Felony – 3:36
12. "She Talks in Stereo" – Gary Myrick & the Figures – 4:00
13. "Oldest Story in the World" – The Plimsouls – 3:22
14. "School Is In" – Josie Cotton – 2:34
15. "I Melt with You" – Modern English – 3:48

CD Valley Girl (More Music from the Soundtrack) (Rhino, 1995)

1. "Girls Like Me" – Bonnie Hayes with the Wild Combo – 3:02
2. "Eaten by the Monster of Love" – Sparks – 3:01
3. "Mickey" – Toni Basil – 3:28
4. "Zero Hour (Original Version)" – The Plimsouls – 2:35
5. "He Was Really Sayin' Somethin'" – Bananarama – 3:46
6. "In the Name of Love" – Thompson Twins – 3:20
7. "The Earthquake Song" – The Little Girls – 2:33
8. "Do You Really Want to Hurt Me" – Culture Club – 4:24
9. "Cool Places" – Sparks & Jane Wiedlin – 3:25
10. "Town Called Malice" – The Jam – 2:56
11. "I Eat Cannibals" – Total Coelo – 3:33
12. "Time to Win" – Gary Myrick & the Figures – 4:05
13. "Voo Doo" – Rachel Sweet – 3:39
14. "Marina Men" – Valley Girls – 4:26
15. "Pocket Pool" – Killer Pussy – 4:18
16. "Shelly's Boyfriend" – Bonnie Hayes with the Wild Combo – 3:38

== Home media ==
Valley Girl is available on DVD. The special edition DVD contains many extras, including the option of a running commentary by director Martha Coolidge, and interviews with many of the cast and crew, including Cage, Bowen, Holicker, Case, and Daily. Deborah Foreman (Julie) is notably absent from this. In the DVD documentary, Daily admits that she had no idea what Valley Girls were supposed to sound like and decided that Loryn would be from Malibu, California (and therefore not a true Valley Girl) in order to cover this up, she later provided the singing voice of Two and a Half Men's Jake Harper who splits his time between his parents' homes in Malibu and the Valley. Shout Factory released Valley Girl on Blu-ray on October 30, 2018.

== Remake ==
In November 2016, MGM announced that a remake of Valley Girl was being planned, to be directed by Rachel Lee Goldenberg.Jessica Rothe will play Julie in the remake. In January 2017, it was announced that Josh Whitehouse will play Randy in the remake. In April 2017, Chloe Bennet, Ashleigh Murray, Jessie Ennis, and Logan Paul joined the cast. In May 2017, Mae Whitman also joined the cast.

The film was scheduled for a June 29, 2018 release. On March 1, 2018, MGM announced that the film had been pulled from its schedule because of ongoing controversies surrounding Logan Paul. It was once again set for May 8, 2020. However, due to the COVID-19 pandemic, the film's theatrical release was scrapped and was instead released as a video-on-demand title and in select drive-ins.

== See also ==
- List of American films of 1983
