= Jackass Number Two: Music from the Motion Picture =

Soundtrack album by various artists
- Released: September 26, 2006
- Genres: Alternative rock; punk rock; heavy metal; hip hop
- Length: 48:22
- Label: BulletProof Music

Jackass Number Two: Music from the Motion Picture is the soundtrack from the movie Jackass Number Two.

== Background ==
The soundtrack was released on September 26, 2006 by Bulletproof Records. The soundtrack features songs that were featured in the movie, and various audio clips from the movie. Three Six Mafia teamed up with now former Saliva front man, Josey Scott to create the song "Gettin' Fucked Up" exclusively for the soundtrack. Additionally, Karen O from Yeah Yeah Yeahs, teamed up with Peaches to write "Backass", another exclusive for the soundtrack. The soundtrack also includes the debut single, "Karazy", by Chris Pontius and a cover of Roger Alan Wade's "If You're Gonna Be Dumb" by rock group Smut Peddlers. The soundtrack also includes their version of "The Best of Times". Oddly enough, the movie's single, Joker & the Thief by Wolfmother, isn't featured on the soundtrack. A censored version of the album is available which omits "Gettin' Fucked Up" and "Fuck the Pain Away". Track #10 is a soundbite from the deleted scene in which they use a Lamborghini to pull Bam Margera's uncle "Don Vito"s tooth.

== Track listing ==
1. Johnny Knoxville – "I'm Going to the Moon" *
2. Smut Peddlers – "If You're Gonna Be Dumb"
3. Three Six Mafia feat. Josey Scott – "Gettin' Fucked Up" ***
4. Karen O feat. Peaches – "Backass"
5. Chris Pontius – "I'm Ashamed of Myself" *
6. The Datsuns – "MF (Motherfucker) from Hell"
7. Ehren McGhehey – "I'm Going to Die" *
8. Turbonegro – "All My Friends Are Dead"
9. The Vandals – "Urban Struggle"
10. Brandon DiCamillo – "Your Teeth Look Like" *
11. Cakecutter – "Fly"
12. Johnny Knoxville – "Rectal Bleeding" *
13. Peaches – "Fuck the Pain Away" ***
14. Johnny Knoxville & Bam Margera – "Are You Crying?" *
15. Elvis Presley – "A Little Less Conversation"
16. Pavement – "Cut Your Hair"
17. Chris Pontius – "Karazy"
18. Steve-O – "I Need a Doctor" *
19. Slayer – "Spill the Blood"
20. Dave England – "My Ass Hurts So Bad" *
21. Josie Cotton – "Johnny, Are You Queer?"
22. Roger Alan Wade – "Sometimes I Don't Know If I'll Make It"
23. The Cast of Jackass – "The Best of Times"

* Audio clips from the movie, except for "Your Teeth Look Like".
*** Not available on the edited version of the soundtrack.

"Treatment Bound" by The Replacements plays during the credits of the movie, but is not featured on the soundtrack.
