= DFX2 =

DFX2 may refer to:

- DFX2 (band)
- Delta Force: Xtreme 2
