= Avant Gardener (disambiguation) =

"Avant Gardener" is a 2013 song by Courtney Barnett.

Avant Gardener may also refer to:

- Avant Gardner, a nightclub and music venue in New York City
- The Avant Gardeners, English new wave band formed in 1977 as The Avant Gardener, and their 1977 EP
- Avant Gardener, a nickname of Scottish poet and gardener Ian Hamilton Finlay
