= Convertible Music =

Studio album by Josie Cotton
- Released: 1982
- Genres: Pop rock, new wave
- Length: 31:05
- Label: Elektra
- Producers: Roy Thomas Baker; Bobby and Larson Paine

Josie Cotton chronology
| Convertible Music (1982) | From the Hip (1984) |

Professional ratings
Review scores
| Source | Rating |
|---|---|
| AllMusic | 4.5/5 stars |

Convertible Music is the 1982 new wave debut album by pop rock artist Josie Cotton, released on Elektra Records.

Convertible Music contained Cotton's two more well-known songs, the minor hits "Johnny Are You Queer?" and "He Could Be the One", both of which were performed by Cotton in the 1983 movie Valley Girl as well as appeared on the film's hit soundtrack (#155, Billboard 200).

== Track listing ==
1. "He Could Be the One" (Paine, Paine) – 2:48
2. "Rockin' Love" (Paine, Paine) – 3:02
3. "Waitin' for Your Love" (Cotton) – 3:21
4. "So Close" (Cotton) – 2:39
5. "I Need the Night, Tonight" (Cotton) – 3:12
6. "Johnny Are You Queer?" (Paine, Paine) – 2:46
7. "Systematic Way" (Cotton) – 2:57
8. "Another Girl" (Cotton) – 3:14
9. "Bye, Bye Baby" (Cotton) – 2:57
10. "No Pictures of Dad" (Giltridge) – 3:33
11. "Tell Him" (Russell) – 2:36

== Personnel ==
- Josie Cotton – vocals
- J. B. Frank – keyboards
- Gary Ferguson – drums
- Pete McRae – guitar
- Bobby Paine – guitar, bass guitar
