= Single Bullet Theory (disambiguation) =

The single-bullet theory is a theory related to the assassination of John F. Kennedy.

Single Bullet Theory may also refer to:

- Single Bullet Theory (new wave band), American new wave band from Richmond, Virginia
- Single Bullet Theory (metal band), American heavy metal band from Philadelphia, Pennsylvania
