= Discovering Japan =

1979 song by British rock musician Graham Parker

Single by Graham Parker

from the album Squeezing Out Sparks
- B-side: "Local Girls"
- Released: 4 May 1979
- Recorded: Lansdowne Studios, London
- Genre: Rock, new wave
- Label: Vertigo
- Songwriter: Graham Parker
- Producer: Jack Nitzsche

Graham Parker singles chronology
"Protection" (1979)	"Discovering Japan" (1979)	"Local Girls" (1979)

"Discovering Japan" is a song by British rock musician Graham Parker, recorded with his backing band the Rumour. The song was released on his 1979 album, Squeezing Out Sparks.

Lyrically inspired by a tour of Japan, "Discovering Japan" was a departure from the simplicity of some of Parker's earlier work. The song was released as a single in the UK in 1979, but did not chart. The song has since become one of Parker's most famous songs.

== Background ==
"Discovering Japan" was inspired by a tour that Parker and the Rumour went on that included stops in Japan and Australia. As a new wave artist, Parker received much more attention in Japan as opposed to his native UK; Parker explained, "I'd been on tour, and I remember being on an airplane flying back from Japan, which was, and probably still is, like an alien planet. It's really different. I'd toured there, and we'd had quite a tremendous amount of success—there and Australia. ... In Japan, we were the mainstay of new wave, so we were sort of accepted as something on the cutting edge. It was quite an experience. So I was on the plane coming back, and there were these little Japanese ladies in front of me making origami birds and passing them back to us and giggling. These ladies in kimonos flying back to England. ... All these things were running together in my head, and I scribbled down these lyrics that became 'Discovering Japan'". Parker's trip to Japan also inspired "Waiting for the UFOs", another Squeezing Out Sparks track.

In a 1979 Rolling Stone interview, Parker joked about the cultural differences between the UK and Japan, saying, "You go into a bar over there, and they're eating raw whale meat. I mean, can you believe that? ... I mean, fucking whales are going extinct, and here are these people eating them!"

== Recording ==
"Discovering Japan" was recorded alongside the rest of Squeezing Out Sparks at Lansdowne Studios in London. Initially, the song was unpopular with the members of the Rumour, but producer Jack Nitzsche convinced Parker of the song's worth. Parker recalled, "Martin Belmont was literally tsk-tsking 'Discovering Japan'. We were trying to get it down and Martin was like, 'Ehhh'. He thought the song was crap. He just didn't see it. Obviously, that affects me, so I'm thinking 'Well, maybe it is. I guess going from D to B minor is not so cool.' The spin I put on the chord sequence is not obvious at all, but nobody saw it. Eventually I had to say to Jack, 'You're the producer, tell us what to do'."

== Music and lyrics ==
Graham Parker wrote "Discovering Japan" after returning from the tour. He said of the time, "I can remember coming back from Japan having all these words flying through my head that came to make the song 'Discovering Japan' for instance. I didn't write the songs particularly on the road, because I'm not good at that, but I definitely got the balance for the album from living such a crazy lifestyle, from coming from 1975 when I was living with my parents in a village in the country working in a gas station."

Musically, the song was a departure from the R&B music Parker had written in the past. He explained, "Sometimes songs come out easy; sometimes they don't. That one was a very difficult song to write. The chord sequences are still, for want of a better word, advanced. This ain't no R&B thing; this is something else altogether. ... I was breaking some different ground in the rhythmic structures and the whole push/pull of the thing. The way the chords spun around on each other and the lyric was so totally mysterious that I didn't even understand it myself."

== Release ==
"Discovering Japan" was chosen as the opening track to Parker's 1979 album Squeezing Out Sparks. Parker explained his choice in an interview, saying, "It has to do with rhythmic structure, and lyrics that may knock on to the next song. There's a feel to it that's a little bit indefinable; it's hard to pin down what does it, really. I guess with 'Japan' it was, to me, that it had everything going for it. It sort of said, 'This is different. This is a new album. This will not have horn sections, and not so many R&B references. It's something else, some different kind of rock music.'"

"Discovering Japan" was released in the UK as the second single from the Squeezing Out Sparks album, backed by "Local Girls". The single ultimately failed to chart and was the final UK single release from the album. Despite this, the song has since become one of Parker's most popular songs. Parker later said of the track, "It was a very, very important song for me, no question"; in a 1998 interview, Parker said of the song, "I couldn't write anything like that any more", while in a 2005 interview, he said, "I know how good 'Discovering Japan' is — the lyrics, the chord sequence, there's nothing like that, there's nobody that good these days". Parker continues to perform the song live; he released an acoustic version of the song with Paste in 2019.
