= Squeezing Out Sparks =

Studio album by Graham Parker
- Released: March 1979
- Studios: Lansdowne Studios, London
- Genre: New wave
- Length: 37:18
- Labels: Arista; Vertigo
- Producer: Jack Nitzsche

Graham Parker chronology
The Parkerilla (1978)	Squeezing Out Sparks (1979)	The Up Escalator (1980)

Singles from Squeezing Out Sparks
- 1. "Protection" Released: 23 February 1979 (UK); 2. "Discovering Japan" Released: 4 May 1979 (UK); 3. "Local Girls" Released: July 1979 (US)

Squeezing Out Sparks is the fourth studio album by English singer-songwriter Graham Parker and his band the Rumour. The album was released in March 1979.

Critically acclaimed, Squeezing Out Sparks was voted album of the year in The Village Voice's year-end Pazz & Jop critics' poll and later ranked number 334 on Rolling Stone magazine's list of the 500 greatest albums of all time.

== Background ==
Squeezing Out Sparks transcends the medium. I don't think there's anything as good as that by anybody anywhere. And I don't even take credit for it. I don't know what happened. I blacked out.

— Graham Parker

Whereas Parker's previous albums were notable for their strong soul influences, with many prominent tracks and singles including a horn section, on Squeezing Out Sparks producer Jack Nitzsche favoured a rawer sound. Coincidentally, popular punk band the Clash were undergoing a reverse process, trying to expand their musical arrangements. Therefore, the Rumour's rhythm and blues session players went on to record all the horn parts in the Clash's third and praised record London Calling.

Parker explained the recording process in an interview, saying:

The album took eleven days to record. It took two days to get the studio [Lansdowne Studios in London] working because it had only been used by Acker Bilk and things like that. The third day we managed to play a song, and Jack said, 'Come and listen to this.' There was just this big mess coming out. So Jack and I went up to his hotel room and I told him we wanted to get back to fundamentals but we didn't know how to. I said, 'Jack, you gotta say what you think.' He was a bit paranoid about criticizing the band. I said to him, 'Jack, we're English. We sneer, we're cynical, we're miserable. But we really don’t mean it.' So the next day we came in, and anything he said, I said, 'Yeah, come on. Carry on. Wot? Wot? Come on, say it. Here, have another beer.' And eventually we got it out.

The album was originally written to follow a greater concept about growing up in suburbia. Parker explained, "I was kind of attempting a concept album about the suburbs of England, or at least trying to capture a vague approximation of suburban life. ... I guess I drifted off the mark there for the rest of the record because the concept turned out to be a little confining for a whole album." This is reflected in the lyrics to songs such as "Local Girls" and "Saturday Nite Is Dead".

Music videos were made for "Local Girls" and "Protection", and the tracks "Discovering Japan" and "Passion Is No Ordinary Word" received radio airplay. In addition, "You Can't Be Too Strong", an uncharacteristic somber acoustic guitar ballad, met with controversy over its subject matter and narrative: a man's reflections on his girlfriend's abortion. Summing up the album, Parker stated, "Squeezing Out Sparks didn't have as much roots or swing, and there was no horn section on it. The songs were just great."

== Release ==
Studio versions of "I Want You Back" (a Jackson 5 cover) and "Mercury Poisoning" were originally issued on a 45 rpm 7" single which was included with early copies of the album.

In 1996, Arista Records issued Squeezing Out Sparks + Live Sparks with the original ten tracks followed by live versions of the same songs, in the same order, plus live versions of the two bonus tracks, "I Want You Back (Alive)" and "Mercury Poisoning". Live Sparks had originally been released only as a limited edition, promotional picture disc LP.

Squeezing Out Sparks was reissued in the United Kingdom in 2001 by Mercury Records and Vertigo Records, with the two bonus studio tracks.

== Critical reception ==
Professional ratings
Review scores
Source	Rating
AllMusic	5/5 stars
Christgau's Record Guide	A
The Encyclopedia of Popular Music	4/5 stars
Pitchfork	8.8/10
The Rolling Stone Album Guide	4/5 stars
Smash Hits	8/10
Spin Alternative Record Guide	7/10
Uncut	5/5 stars

Squeezing Out Sparks was well received by contemporary critics. Robert Christgau of The Village Voice called it "[a]n amazing record" in a "A+"-rated review for The Village Voice, adding that "Parker's mood, which has narrowed into existential rage with a circumstantial root, makes for perfect, untamable rock and roll." In Rolling Stone, Greil Marcus wrote that the album "is no landmark", but nonetheless praised it as an ambitious work that depicted "true fear and drama." Squeezing Out Sparks was ranked among the top ten albums of the year for 1979 by NME, with "Protection" ranked among the year's top 50 tracks. Critical reception for the album was capped by its being voted the best album of the year in the 1979 Village Voice Pazz & Jop critics' poll.

The album's critical reputation has grown since its release. Trouser Press called it "his toughest, leanest and most lyrically sophisticated LP", while AllMusic critic Stephen Thomas Erlewine cited it as Parker's "finest album", "a masterful fusion of pub rock classicism, new wave pop, and pure vitriol". In 2003, Rolling Stone placed Squeezing Out Sparks at number 335 on its list of the 500 greatest albums of all time; the list's 2012 edition ranked the album 334th.

== Track listing ==
All tracks are written by Graham Parker, except where noted.

Side one
No.	Title	Length
1.	"Discovering Japan"	3:32
2.	"Local Girls"	3:44
3.	"Nobody Hurts You"	3:42
4.	"You Can't Be Too Strong"	3:21
5.	"Passion Is No Ordinary Word"	4:26

Side two
No.	Title	Length
1.	"Saturday Nite Is Dead"	3:18
2.	"Love Gets You Twisted"	3:02
3.	"Protection"	3:54
4.	"Waiting for the UFO's"	3:08
5.	"Don't Get Excited"	3:04

Bonus tracks (2001 reissue)
No.	Title	Writer(s)	Length
1.	"Mercury Poisoning"		3:09
2.	"I Want You Back (Alive)"	The Corporation	3:26

== Personnel ==
- Graham Parker – lead vocals, rhythm guitar

The Rumour

- Brinsley Schwarz – guitar, backing vocals
- Martin Belmont – rhythm guitar, backing vocals
- Bob Andrews – keyboards, backing vocals
- Steve Goulding – drums, backing vocals
- Andrew Bodnar – bass

== Charts ==
Chart (1979)	Peak position
Australian Albums (Kent Music Report)	22
Canada Top Albums/CDs (RPM)	79
New Zealand Albums (RMNZ)	31
Swedish Albums (Sverigetopplistan)	14
UK Albums (Official Charts)	18
US Billboard 200	40
