= Mercury Poisoning =

1979 song by Graham Parker

Single by Graham Parker and the Rumour
- Released: February 1979
- Genre: Rock; new wave
- Length: 3:09
- Label: Stiff (UK); Arista (US)
- Songwriter(s): Graham Parker

Graham Parker and the Rumour singles chronology
"Hey Lord, Don't Ask Me Questions" (1978)	"Mercury Poisoning" (1979)	"Protection" (1979)

"Mercury Poisoning" is a song written by rock musician Graham Parker and performed by Graham Parker and the Rumour. Inspired by Parker's frustration with his record company, Mercury Records, the song was released as a promotional single by Parker's new label, Arista Records, in February 1979. Because of the song's controversial nature, it was pulled from its planned release as the B-side to Parker's 1979 single, "Protection."

"Mercury Poisoning" has since become one of Parker's most famous songs. It has since seen praise from critics for its angry and sarcastic lyrics and appeared on multiple compilation and live albums.

== Background ==
"Mercury Poisoning" was written as a critique of Parker's record label at the time, Mercury Records. Parker had felt the label was not promoting him sufficiently and, after releasing the live album The Parkerilla on Mercury, signed with Arista Records. At the time, he joked, "It wouldn't matter if I was singing Saturday Night Fever with Mercury, it would still be a flop." Parker later claimed that the song idea originated from manager Dave Robinson, who had joked that Parker should write an album of "hate songs" directed at Mercury. Robinson similarly criticized Mercury, claiming that Parker could have been as big as Bruce Springsteen with better label support.

When asked about the reaction to the song in 1979, Parker stated, "It was a great reaction, actually. The public liked it anyway and Arista liked it a lot. They thought it was great fun." Parker dedicated the song to Arista head Clive Davis during live performances of the period. Discussing his relationship with Arista, Parker recalled, "[Davis] gave us a deal with way too much money in it than was healthy. To expect huge promotional money after getting a deal like that was perhaps a bit naive, and before long my manager was just as pissed with Arista as he was with Mercury! ... I can't say that this deal was much healthier than the Mercury one in that respect, but I got large advances, all of which got spent on absurdly expensive records with expensive producers in expensive studios and good sized tour support."

== Release ==
"Mercury Poisoning" was first released in the US by Arista as a gray-colored promotional 12" single in February 1979. Since Parker was still signed to Mercury's sister label, Vertigo, "Mercury Poisoning" was instead released anonymously on a limited basis by manager Dave Robinson's label, Stiff Records. Stiff released 200 copies of the single to members of the media in an attempt to stir controversy, but the gesture did not have a significant impact.

Despite being written at the same time, "Mercury Poisoning" was not initially included on Parker's 1979 album Squeezing Out Sparks. Parker explained, "Sometimes some of the little throwaway things that take a few minutes to write, you just don't think that they really have the integrity. I mean, 'Mercury Poisoning' is a bit of fun and all that, but I didn't think it had the integrity to be on Squeezing Out Sparks." Due to the song's popularity, however, Arista began to include a free "Mercury Poisoning" single with every purchase of the Squeezing Out Sparks album.

Initially, the song was intended to be the B-side to "Protection," the lead single from Squeezing Out Sparks. However, Mercury felt the song damaged their commercial interests and pressured Phonogram, the head of Parker's new label, Vertigo Records, to switch the B-side to Parker's version of the Jackson 5's "I Want You Back". Discussing "Mercury Poisoning", Parker said, "I just wanted to put it out as a single but they wouldn't let us. It was silly really because it's just a song. It's not going to break down a whole business—a massive conglomerate."

In addition to its single release, the song has appeared as the B-side to several other Parker songs from the period. It has also appeared in live form on Live Sparks and Live Alone! Discovering Japan; Parker noted that the version from the latter featured a "sort of sea shanty rhythm."

== Reception ==
Mark Deming of AllMusic wrote of the song, "One would be hard pressed to find someone who wrote a better—or more vehement—song about their problems in the music biz than 'Mercury Poisoning.'" Deming went on to state, "'Mercury Poisoning" was a furiously catchy and bitterly hilarious song, and ... Parker and his musicians tore into it with gleeful rage." Geoffrey Himes of Musician described the song as a "a legendary blast" to Mercury, while J.D. Considine of The Baltimore Sun praised the song's "pointed sarcasm." Chris Willman of The Los Angeles Times named the song as "among [Parker's] most stinging attacks."
