= The Book of Your Regrets =

Studio album by the Rave-Ups
- Released: 1988
- Genre: Pop rock, country rock
- Label: Epic
- Producer: David Leonard

The Rave-Ups chronology
Town + Country (1985)	The Book of Your Regrets (1988)	Chance (1990)

The Book of Your Regrets is the second album by the American band the Rave-Ups, released in 1988. They supported it by opening for the Church and then the Mighty Lemon Drops on North American tours.

== Production ==
The album was produced by David Leonard. Its songs were written or cowritten by frontman Jimmer Podrasky, who was influenced by Bob Dylan, John Prine, and Hank Williams, among others. He considered the songs to be pop music and conceded that the band tried to record a "safe" album. "Mickey of Alphabet City" is about a drug addict in Alphabet City. "Sue & Sonny" is a narrative about a man who commits suicide because of marital problems.

== Critical reception ==
Professional ratings
Review scores
Source	Rating
AllMusic	3/5 stars
The Birmingham News	4/4 stars
Robert Christgau	B+
Houston Chronicle	5/5 stars
LA Weekly	6/10
Los Angeles Times	3/4 stars

The St. Petersburg Times called the album "curiously mannered" and concluded, "Next time around, Podrasky should sneak a peek at the meaning of rave before he hits the studio. If that doesn't work, he could always write songs for the BoDeans". The Chicago Tribune said it was "an energetic and uplifting triumph reminiscent at times of a revved-up Tom Petty or his influences [of] the Byrds and other country-rock-meets-British-Invasion groups." Robert Christgau praised Terry Wilson's "indubitable guitar-banjo-lapsteel-keybs-etc."

The Washington Post opined that "the first side ... often achieves an ingratiating balance between the quartet's pop-rock and country influences". The Los Angeles Times concluded, "This is what John Cougar Mellencamp's Americana might sound like if his records were as smart as they are earnest." The Pittsburgh Press panned the "too loud" mix and "isn't-life-gritty" lyrics. The Houston Chronicle considered The Book of Your Regrets to be one of the best "pop or contemporary rock" albums of 1988. The Capital Times listed it among the ten best albums of the year.

== Track listing ==
No.	Title	Length
1.	"Freedom Bound"
2.	"Sue & Sonny"
3.	"Please Take Her (She's Mine)"
4.	"Mickey of Alphabet City"
5.	"If Fun Was Not"
6.	"Knockin' at Your Door"
7.	"When the End Comes Before"
8.	"A Girl for Me"
9.	"Catching Moonbeams"
10.	"This House"
11.	"These Wishes"
12.	"Blue Carrot"
