= The Rave-Ups =

American rock band

- Origin: Pittsburgh, Pennsylvania, USA
- Genres: Alternative rock, pop rock, power pop, roots rock, alternative country
- Years active: 1979–1992, 2015–present
- Labels: Fun Stuff Records, Epic Records
- Past members: Jimmer Podrasky; Michael Kaniecki; George Carter; T.J. Junco; Richard Slevin; Victor McPoland; Tim Jimenez; Colleen Campbell; Danny Zippi; Chuck Wada; Douglas Leonard; Terry Wilson; Tommy Blatnik

The Rave-Ups are an American rock group founded in 1979 in Pittsburgh, Pennsylvania who gained greater attention after relocating to Los Angeles, California.

They are best known for their alternative rock hit songs "Respectfully King of Rain" and "Positively Lost Me" as well as their appearances in Pretty in Pink and Beverly Hills, 90210.

The group's music has been diverse, touching on singer-songwriter, pop-rock, power-pop, roots rock, alternative rock, and alt-country, well before the alt-country movement. Critic Ira Robbins described the Rave-Ups as having been "touted as the next big thing to erupt from the LA club scene" of the 1980s, but also dogged by legal and personal problems that hampered the band's success.

== Band history ==
=== Origins ===
The Rave-Ups were founded at Carnegie Mellon University in the fall of 1979 by Jimmer Podrasky (guitar/vocals), with Michael Kaniecki (guitar/vocals), George Carter (bass, violin, vocals), and T.J. Junco (drums). The original group lasted only through that fall when T.J. Junco left the band. Richard Slevin (drums) joined the group in January 1980 and helped the band develop through the year, and though the group was considered part of Pittsburgh's early punk/new wave scene, along with its sister group The Shakes/Combo Tactic. With a somewhat more polished style than many of their peers, The Rave-Ups were considered less an example of the Punk genre and more of a musical stew of punk, pop, country, blues and folk. The band performed mostly original songs written by Podrasky and Kaniecki, with some songs contributed by Carter, and a few covers. Early performances in Pittsburgh were at The Electric Banana, The Decade Lounge, functions at Carnegie Mellon, as well as regular gigs at Fat City in Swissvale.

During the summer of 1980 the band made 4-track and 16-track studio recordings, including the later popular "Class Tramp" and "In My Gremlin," along with the usual live recordings of club dates. Slevin left the band in the summer of 1980 to return to his native New York City and was replaced by Victor McPoland, a fellow Pittsburgher and Carnegie/Mellon grad. Meanwhile, the band left Pittsburgh and relocated briefly to Los Angeles, California. Appearing as the "band" in a John Wells (later of E.R. and The West Wing fame) production of Sam Shepard's "The Tooth of Crime" the group spent eight weeks in the sun of Los Angeles before returning home to Pittsburgh. A later return to LA by the band didn't gel and the original members broke up soon afterward. Podrasky returned briefly to Pittsburgh, but eventually booked a flight back to Los Angeles in order to further the musical agenda already established by the Pittsburgh group.

=== Second incarnation (Class Tramp, Town + Country and Pretty In Pink) ===
The second incarnation of the band followed after Podrasky met drummer Tim Jimenez in the San Fernando Valley in 1982. Podrasky and Jimenez quickly became close friends and enlisted a bass player, Colleen Campbell, to join the band. Danny Zippi, already established as an actor, joined the group soon after and the band gigged around Los Angeles, almost always for free. Within the year, Campbell and Zippi were replaced by guitarist Chuck Wada & bassist Douglas Leonard. That line-up signed an indie deal and released a six-song EP entitled Class Tramp on Fun Stuff Records in 1983. The EP sold all 3,000 copies produced. But the Podrasky-Jimenez-Wada-Leonard line-up didn't last long. Late in 1984, Terry Wilson (guitar) and Tommy Blatnik (bass guitar) joined the band on a permanent basis. Ironically, all four members of the band now worked in the mailroom/shipping department of A&M Records, and it was in the basement of the A&M lot that the band rehearsed nightly, honing their craft amongst stacks of posters, album flats and music merchandising. In 1985, the band released their first full-length album, Town + Country, which was met with widespread critical acclaim and sold more than 40,000 copies. The album's only single, "Positively Lost Me," became a college radio hit and cemented the band as thoughtful alt-rockers with an extremely accessible sound, smart songs, and a considerable fondness for country, blues and folk.

Teen actress Molly Ringwald, who had become a friend and fan of the band through her sister Beth's relationship with Podrasky, introduced the band to moviegoers in the John Hughes' classic Sixteen Candles when her character's three-ring binder featured the name "The Rave-Ups" scratched on it with a ball point pen. Ringwald later invited director John Hughes to see the band at a club date where the band informally and successfully auditioned for an appearance in the movie Pretty in Pink. In the movie, the Rave-Ups play their song "Rave-Up, Shut-Up" on stage while Duckie (Jon Cryer) talks with Iona (Annie Potts) at a nearby table, just before Andie (Ringwald) and Blane (Andrew McCarthy) join them. The next song played by the Rave-Ups in this scene is "Positively Lost Me." The band also appeared on the MTV "Pretty In Pink" Movie Premiere Special performing "Positively Lost Me". That song became a cult hit big enough that Rhino Records included the song on Rhino's Just Can't Get Enough: New Wave Hits of The 80's - Vol. 12. During this time the band was getting major acclaim from critics including Robert Christgau, Robert Hilburn, J.D. Considine, Todd Everett and Roy Trakin and entered into talks with several major record labels.

During their still-evolving musical peak, the band was locked in legal battles, all in the hope of moving on to a major label; from 1986 to 1987, little music was released, with the exception of a 12-inch single, "These Wishes" (later covered by Pittsburgh band, The Clarks). The poignant ballad "Big Wide River" was the B-side of the single, which was produced by Los Lobos' Steve Berlin and engineer Mark Linnett. The band recorded a full-length album with Berlin and Linnett producing, but the record was never released.

=== Epic records (The Book of Your Regrets and Chance) ===
In 1987, the band signed to Epic Records and released in 1988 their major label debut The Book of Your Regrets to high critical expectations, despite being only promoted to the college radio scene (albeit a burgeoning one). The album failed to sell many copies, due to Epic's corporate restructuring with Sony and lack of promotion. The label almost dropped the band but a few believers from Epic insisted that the band get another opportunity. That same year, their song "Class Tramp" appeared in the cult horror anthology film From a Whisper to a Scream.

1990 saw the release of the album Chance (named after Podrasky's son with Beth Ringwald) to slightly more commercial success. The single "Respectfully King of Rain" became a modest alternative rock hit, garnering some video airplay on MTV and peaking at No. 12 on the Modern Rock Tracks chart. The second single, a radio-friendly pop anthem called "(She Says) Come Around" was readied for distribution (including a music video) by Epic who then decided that they would not promote the single or video and, soon after, dropped the band from the label. The band continued working for a few months, including an appearance on an episode of Beverly Hills, 90210 ("Spring Dance") and an opening slot on an Indigo Girls tour. Podrasky soon found himself in a brief relationship/engagement with 90210's star, Shannen Doherty; however, Podrasky's single-father status (he and Ringwald had split up many months earlier) didn't gel with a Hollywood lifestyle and the relationship soon ended. Within months, after much frustration, The Rave-Ups unofficially broke up in 1992.

=== Post break up ===
In 1996–1997, Podrasky briefly formed the band The Lovin' Miserys with Concrete Blonde drummer Harry Rushakoff, producing the limited pressing CD Happy as Hell, which was released only to radio stations. During live shows, they were joined by bass player Sam Bolle from Agent Orange, though in the LA Times interview Jimmer said “On the album, it's just me and Harry Rushakoff.”In 2000, members of The Rave-Ups (Podrasky and Wilson) reformed, recording a CD entitled The Salmon in the Woods which has remained unreleased as of 2012.

Over the years, Wilson has played on stage and in studio with many bands including the Springfield, Missouri all-star band, The Dog People and spending some time with The Ozark Mountain Devils. Jimenez continues to play with and produce various bands in Los Angeles. Blatnik has also spent time playing with The Dancing Hoods (whose guitarist Mark Linkous later formed Sparklehorse) and The Lonesome Strangers (featuring singer/songwriters Randy Weeks & Jeff Rymes).

=== Reformation and future developments ===
Podrasky and Wilson continued to maintain a musical partnership, writing and performing occasionally over the following years. In August 2007, with Jimenez and Blatnik back in the rhythm section, the band re-grouped to play some shows in the Los Angeles area.

Jimmer Podrasky recorded his first solo album with drummer/producer Mitch Marine, guitarist/songwriter Brian Whelan and bassist/songwriter Ted Russell Kamp; the album is "The Would-Be Plans" and was released through JimmerMusic.com in September 2013. According to an interview with MSN Music, Podrasky had intended the album to be a Rave-Ups reunion but couldn't get the other band members on board. Though he had the right to release it as a Rave-Ups record, he felt it wouldn't be right, so it's his first official solo album.

In late 2015, The Rave-Ups approached Omnivore Recordings about re-releasing the "Town + Country" album as part of the 30th anniversary of the initial Fun Stuff Records release. On July 8, 2016, the re-release became a reality. This reissue of "Town + Country" features the original 10 songs, plus 11 previously unissued bonus tracks — including live radio performances recorded for Dierdre O'Donoghue's influential "SNAP" program on Los Angeles’ KCRW-FM, as well as 1986 material produced by Steve Berlin (Los Lobos) and Mark Linett. There is also a historical essay from Podrasky, and photos from the sessions/era. Mastering and restoration was overseen by Grammy winner Gavin Lurssen.

According to Podrasky from the liner notes:

Music has the uncanny ability to thwart time and space. It informs a moment. It indexes lives. It creates strange bedfellows. It outlasts people — even the people who helped make the music. Music resonates more than any other art form — that is its unique power. It remains with us long after the last note has faded. "Town + Country" was the beginning of a lifelong journey for me — the start of a trip that still hasn’t ended. I’m proud and honored to have been a part of something that has withstood the test of time.

In 2022 the band fully reunited and released Tomorrow, their first full-length in 30 years on Omnivore.

== Band members ==
Main line-up (1984-92; 2015-present)

- Jimmer Podrasky – guitar, vocals
- Tim Jimenez – drums
- Terry Wilson – guitar
- Tommy Blatnik – bass

All members

- Jimmer Podrasky – guitar, vocals (1979-80, 1982-92)
- Michael Kaniecki – guitar, vocals (1979-80)
- George Carter – bass, violin, vocals (1979-80)
- T.J. Junco – drums (1979)
- Richard Slevin – drums (1980)
- Victor McPoland – drums (1980)
- Tim Jimenez – drums (1982-92)
- Colleen Campbell – bass (1982-83)
- Danny Zippi – guitar (1982-83)
- Chuck Wada – guitar (1983-84)
- Douglas Leonard – bass (1983-84)
- Terry Wilson – guitar (1984-92)
- Tommy Blatnik – bass (1984-92)

== Discography ==
Studio albums

- Town + Country (Fun Stuff Records/Demon Records, 1985)(Omnivore Recordings, 2016) (CD re-release with 11 bonus tracks)
- The Book of Your Regrets (Epic Records, 1988)
- Chance (Epic Records, 1990) - US CMJ #9
- Tomorrow (Omnivore Recordings, 2022)

Singles and extended plays

- Class Tramp (12" 6-song EP, Fun Stuff Records, 1983)
- "Positively Lost Me" (Fun Stuff Records, 1985)
- "These Wishes"/"Big Wide River" (Fun Stuff Records, 1986) (12" single, very limited edition)
- "Freedom Bound" (Epic Records, 1988) (Promo)
- Hamlet Meets John Doe (Epic Records, 1989) (Limited edition of 2000 CDs. Contained "Respectfully King Of Rain" from Chance and two non-album tracks: "Train to Nowhere" and "The Night Before Christmas (Hey Baby)") - US Modern Rock #12
- "She Says (Come Around)" (Epic Records, 1990) (Promo)

Compilation appearances

- Just Can't Get Enough: New Wave Hits of the 80's, Volume 12, Various Artists, 1995. (contains the song "Positively Lost Me")
