= Mood Swing (The Nails album) =

Studio album by The Nails
- Released: 1984
- Recorded: 1984
- Genre: New wave
- Length: 41:16
- Label: MCA
- Producer: Gregg Winter

The Nails chronology
Hotel for Women (1981)	Mood Swing (1984)	Dangerous Dreams (1986)

Singles from Mood Swing
- 1. "88 Lines About 44 Women" Released: 1984; 2. "Let It All Hang Out" Released: 1985

Mood Swing is the debut album by American new wave group The Nails. Recorded and released in 1984, it included the novelty single "88 Lines About 44 Women," which entered the Billboard Dance Club Songs chart, and placed at number 208 on the US Pop Albums Sales chart. It is retrospectively held in high regard by critics.

== Background and release ==
In 1984, The Nails signed with RCA for their major-label debut album. The album was recorded the same year at three New York studios: the Boogie Hotel, Electric Lady, and Skyline Studios. The album followed the group's independently-released EP, Hotel for Women, released in early 1981 and featuring three versions of the group's breakout single, "88 Lines About 44 Women," which was again included on Mood Swing in a slightly altered form. The album was produced by Gregg Winter. The group was shown in a December 1984 issue of Billboard, "putting the finishing touches" on the album.

The album was originally released in late 1984, by RCA Records. In 2007, a re-mastered edition of the album was released by CD Baby, and in 2012, another re-release was issued by CityBeat. These versions included two additional tracks: extended remixes of "88 Lines About 44 Women" and "Let It All Hang Out."

== Reception ==
=== Critical ===
In a retrospective review for AllMusic, critic Richard Foss deemed Mood Swing an "album pick" of the group's discography. He awarded it 4 and a half stars out of 5 and went on to praise it as "a remarkably consistent and confident debut," comparing the music to that of The Damned, Jim Carroll, and Stan Ridgway and praising the lyrics' irony.

=== Commercial ===
Upon its release, the album attained modest commercial success. In March 1985, it appeared on Billboard Magazine's list of "Bubbling Under" albums, at number 208. The album failed to enter the Billboard Hot 200 album sales chart; however, they later managed to with their next record, Dangerous Dreams, in 1986. "88 Lines of 44 Women," originally featured on Hotel for Women but re-recorded for Mood Swing, became a hit on MTV and peaked at number 46 on the Billboard Dance Club Songs chart in April 1985.

== Track listing ==
Side A

No.	Title	Writer(s)	Length
1.	"Every Time I Touch You"	Marc Campbell; The Nails	3:53
2.	"Dark Brown"	Campbell; The Nails	5:21
3.	"88 Lines About 44 Women"	Campbell; Douglas Guthrie; David Kaufman; George Kaufman; The Nails; Sean O'Rourke	4:56
4.	"Home of the Brave"	Campbell; The Nails	5:06
Total length:			19:16

Side B

No.	Title	Writer(s)	Length
1.	"Let It All Hang Out"	Cunningham; The Hombres	3:03
2.	"Mood Swing"	Campbell; The Nails	2:52
3.	"Phantom Heart"	Campbell; The Nails	4:26
4.	"Juanita Juanita"	Campbell; The Nails	3:16
5.	"She Is Everything to Me"	Campbell; The Nails	3:11
6.	"White Wall"	Campbell; The Nails	5:12
Total length:			22:00

== Credits ==
Adapted from AllMusic.

Band members

- Marc Campbell — vocals
- Steve O'Rourke — guitar
- George Kaufman - bass
- Douglas Guthrie — saxophone
- David Kaufman — keyboards

Other musicians

- Jimmy Bralower — electronic drums
- Boris Kinberg — percussion
- Arooj Lazewal — tabla, tambourine
- Dennis McDermott — drums
- Khari Paige — background vocals
- Badal Roy — tabla
- Rocky Savino, Jr. — harmonica
- Ellen Warshaw — background vocals
- Gregg Winter — drum programming and synthesizer on "88 Lines About 44 Women", background vocals

Production

- Bruce Harris — executive producer
- Vic Anesini — digital mastering
- Michael Frondelli — engineer
- Chris Isca — assistant engineer
- Roger Moutenot — assistant engineer
- Jack Skinner — mastering
- Gregg Winter — producer
