= Everything Is Oh Yeah =

Studio album by Josie Cotton
- Released: October 4, 2019
- Recorded: 1986
- Genre: New wave; pop rock
- Length: 43:04
- Language: English
- Label: Kitten Robot/Cleopatra
- Producer: Geza X; Larson Paine; Paul Roessler; Hunt Sales

Josie Cotton chronology
Pussycat Babylon (2010)	Everything Is Oh Yeah (2019)

Everything Is Oh Yeah is a 2019 studio album from American pop rock singer Josie Cotton. Recorded in 1986, the album was unreleased for several years due to Cotton losing her record contract.

== Critical reception ==
The editorial staff of AllMusic Guide gave the release four out of five stars, with reviewer Tim Sendra summing up, "Cotton's voice is a thing of wonder that's alternately heartbreakingly sincere and gum-snappingly playful, the songs are endlessly frothy and fun, and the overall joyous spirit can't be ruined by less than perfect production. It's too bad the album was buried for so long, but the fact that it came out at all is well worth celebrating."

== Track listing ==
All songs written by Josie Cotton, except where noted.

1. "Everything Is Oh Yeah" – 2:40
2. "The Way You Rock" – 2:49
3. "If You Really Want Me To" – 1:55
4. "Boulevard" – 3:00
5. "Sometimes Girl" – 3:56
6. "The Night Before" (John Lennon, Paul McCartney) – 3:28
7. "Loves Love" (Bobby Paine, Larson Paine) – 2:52
8. "Hand Over Your Heart" (Paine, Paine) – 2:42
9. "Money" Paine, Paine) – 2:59
10. "Far Away from the Crowd" – 3:51
11. "Fine as You Are" (J. B. Frank) – 3:29
12. "Here Comes My Baby" (Cat Stevens) – 3:13
13. "Systematic Way" – 3:23
14. "Sheena Is a Punk Rocker" (Joey Ramone) – 2:47

== Personnel ==
- Josie Cotton – Composer, Mixing, Primary Artist, Producer, Vocals (Background)
- Timmy Arroyo – photography
- Billy Bremner – guitar
- Tommy Burns – bass, drum programming, guitar, keyboards
- J. B. Frank – keyboards
- Geza X – guitar, production
- Don Heffington – drums
- The Martin Brothers – horn section
- Pete McRae – guitar
- Jeff Mince – drums
- Prescott Niles – bass guitar
- Bobby Paine – bass guitar, guitar, narrator
- Larson Paine – production, backing vocals
- Paul Roessler – keyboards, mixing, production, backing vocals
- Hunt Sales – bass guitar, drum programming, guitar, production
- Brian Setzer – guitar, backing vocals
- Mike Watanabe – bass guitar
- Miko Watanabe – bass guitar
- Marcus Watkins – guitar
