= Protection (Graham Parker song) =

1979 song by Graham Parker

Single by Graham Parker

from the album Squeezing Out Sparks
- B-side: "Mercury Poisoning" "I Want You Back (Alive)"
- Released: 23 February 1979
- Recorded: Lansdowne Studios, London
- Genre: Rock, new wave
- Label: Vertigo
- Songwriter: Graham Parker
- Producer: Jack Nitzsche

Graham Parker singles chronology
"Mercury Poisoning" (1979)	"Protection" (1979)	"Discovering Japan" (1979)

"Protection" is a song by British rock musician Graham Parker, recorded with his backing band the Rumour. The song was released on his 1979 album, Squeezing Out Sparks.

"Protection" was lyrically inspired by a Winston Churchill line and featured a stripped-down arrangement. The song was released as a single in the UK in 1979, but did not chart there. The song has since become one of Parker's most famous songs.

== Background ==
Graham Parker wrote the opening lines to "Protection" after hearing a Winston Churchill quote. He later explained in an interview, "As far as mentioning Churchill goes, I recall seeing a clip of him saying 'So all of you be damned, we can't have heaven crammed' and found it quite offensive so I used it verbatim as the opening salvo on 'Protection'". Parker recalled sending producer Jack Nitzsche an early version of "Protection" in an interview; he explained, "When [Nitzsche] heard that line in 'Protection', 'It ain't the knife through the heart that tears you apart/it's just the thought of someone sticking it in', he was like, 'Fuck!' He was like, 'This is Dylan! That's what you are, man, you're smarter".

Like many other songs on Squeezing Out Sparks, "Protection" features a rawer, more-rock oriented sound than much of Parker's previous work. He explained, "New wave and punk had happened and it seemed to me that I was sometimes thought of as old hat, perhaps an R&B stylist like Southside Johnny, who also used a horn section. In fact we had done two tours with him and the Asbury Jukes. I picked up on the clean and often minimal sound of new wave and used that to some degree on Sparks".

== Release ==
"Protection" was released in the UK as the first single from the Squeezing Out Sparks album. Initially, the single was backed with "Mercury Poisoning", a song Parker wrote as a satirical criticism of his former label, Mercury Records. However, Mercury felt the song damaged their commercial interests and pressured Phonogram, the head of Parker's new label, Vertigo Records, to switch the B-side to Parker's version of the Jackson 5's "I Want You Back". Discussing "Mercury Poisoning", Parker said, "The public liked it anyway and Arista [Parker's American label] liked it a lot. ... I just wanted to put it out as a single but they wouldn't let us. It was silly really because it's just a song. It's not going to break down a whole business—a massive conglomerate."

The single ultimately failed to chart in the UK, despite a promotional music video being filmed for the song.

== Reception ==
Since its release, "Protection" has received positive reception from music critics. Greil Marcus of Rolling Stone called "Protection" a "good song". Dan MacIntosh of SongFacts called the song "wonderful" and characterized it as "antagonistic and blunt".

== Charts ==
Chart (1979)	Peak position
Australia (Kent Music Report)	46
