= You Can't Be Too Strong =

1979 song by Graham Parker

- Norwegian single B-side

Song by Graham Parker

from the album Squeezing Out Sparks
- Released: March 1979
- Recorded: Lansdowne Studios, London
- Genre: Rock; new wave
- Label: Vertigo (UK & Europe); Arista (USA & Canada)
- Songwriter: Graham Parker
- Producer: Jack Nitzsche

"You Can't Be Too Strong" is a song by British rock musician Graham Parker, recorded with his backing band the Rumour. The song was released on his 1979 album, Squeezing Out Sparks. Written about abortion, the song originated as a country-style shuffle before Parker and producer Jack Nitzsche changed it to a slower acoustic ballad.

Though not released as a single, the song has since become one of Parker's most famous songs. The song has seen critical acclaim and has appeared on compilation and live albums. It has since been covered by Joe Jackson and Bob Geldof.

== Background ==
Parker wrote "You Can't Be Too Strong" in his parents' home, after coming home from a Wreckless Eric concert that he made a guest appearance in. Parker characterized the song as "something that I just tossed off, and I thought, 'I don't know about this'."

Lyrically, the song is about abortion. The song was inspired by an event that happened to a close friend of Parker's. Parker later told Australian music magazine Roadrunner that the song was based on an Australian experience and that the lyrical reference to Luna Park came from hearing that it had burned down. In 1979, Parker elaborated on the song's meaning:

When you're sixteen, or eighteen or something, you haven't got any money or anything, and the only thing you can think about is, 'God, I only hope she gets rid of it.' But I'm not eighteen now, and it just makes you think... But when I say, 'You decide what's wrong,' I'm not putting any blame on a woman. I'm saying the fact is that a man doesn't have to decide. A woman does. If it's saying anyone is weak, it's the men, because they don't feel it.

Of the song's political meaning, he said, "I get fairly rankled when people ask whether it's pro- or anti-abortion. I don't deal with such simplicities. It's about being involved in an event." In another interview, Parker said the song was "about ramming my fist so far down your throat you'll need to get a vasectomy to get it out." The song also contains the phrase that gave the Squeezing Out Sparks album its name.

The song was originally written with a country-style arrangement, but producer Jack Nitzsche convinced Parker to slow the song down to reflect the serious subject matter. Parker said, "[The song] started as a fairly uptempo country song until producer Jack Nitzsche realized that the lyrics were pretty heavy and got me to slow it way down. A very good idea!" Parker attributed the song's "weight" to this new arrangement.

== Release ==
"You Can't Be Too Strong" was first released on Parker's fourth studio album, Squeezing Out Sparks, in March 1979. Though not released as a single, the song did appear as the B-side to the Scandinavian-only single release of "Nobody Hurts You."

The song also appeared on the Parker 1993 compilation album Passion is No Ordinary Word: The Graham Parker Anthology. Of the song's inclusion on the compilation, Parker said, "I don't know about 'You Can't Be Too Strong.' It's been sort of a bit overdone, I think. You know, they really wanted to take quintessential stuff and I think mostly they've done that." The song also appeared as the title track to the compilation You Can't Be Too Strong: An Introduction to Graham Parker & the Rumour.

A live version of the song recorded in Philadelphia in 1988 has appeared on the Parker live album Live! Alone in America. Alongside the rest of Squeezing Out Sparks, "You Can't Be Too Strong" has appeared in live form on Live Sparks. Of performing the song live, Parker said of performing the song live in 1979, "Every night I got off singing that. It was great because the audience loved it. Girls cried and stuff which kind of gets you into it."

== Reception and legacy ==
Steven Rosen of American Songwriter said that "You Can't Be Too Strong" was "maybe his greatest song, is the equal of Costello's 'Alison' or anything by Dylan." Stephen Thomas Erlewine of AllMusic describes the song as one of the two "centerpieces" of Squeezing Out Sparks, alongside "Passion Is No Ordinary Word". Erlewine writes that the two songs "indicate that [Parker's] traditionalist musical tendencies are symptomatic of a larger conservative trend. But no one ever said conservatives made poor rock & rollers, and Parker's ruminations over a lost past give him the anger that fuels Squeezing Out Sparks, one of the great rock records of the post-punk era." The New York Times dubbed the song "a gripping retelling of an abortion," while Trouser Press described the song as "a ballad full of disturbing imagery and emphatic phrasing which echoes the album title's judgmental metaphor." Blues Magazine called the track "fantastic" and "insanely beautiful."

The song's take on abortion has resulted in its appearance on National Review's "Top 50 Conservative Songs" list. In the article, John J. Miller writes, "Although it's not explicitly pro-life, this tune describes the horror of abortion with bracing honesty." Parker said of the song's appearance on the list, "I guess you can take what you want from it..."

== Cover versions ==
The song has been covered by fellow new wave musician Joe Jackson. Parker said of this, "I heard Joe did 'Strong,' yes. I'm well chuffed with that."

The song has also been covered by Bob Geldof.
