= Saturday Nite Is Dead =

1979 song by Graham Parker

Song by Graham Parker

from the album Squeezing Out Sparks
- Released: March 1979
- Recorded: Lansdowne Studios, London
- Genre: Rock; new wave
- Label: Vertigo (UK & Europe); Arista (USA & Canada)
- Songwriter(s): Graham Parker
- Producer(s): Jack Nitzsche

"Saturday Nite Is Dead" is a song by British rock musician Graham Parker, recorded with his backing band the Rumour. The song was released on his 1979 album, Squeezing Out Sparks. Written about his experiences growing up in suburbia, the song features caustic lyrics and an angry vocal delivery.

Though not released as a single, the song has since become one of Parker's most famous songs. The song has seen positive critical reception.

== Background and lyrics ==
"Saturday Nite Is Dead" was written partially as a social critique and about his personal upbringing. He explained, "'Saturday Night' was not just about controlled fun for the masses on the weekend; it was also a personal thing about growing up." In another interview, Parker pointed to the artificiality of partying on a Saturday as another example of "squeezing out a spark," referencing the album's title.

The song was originally written by Parker as part of a larger album concept about growing up in suburbia. He explained:

On [Squeezing Out Sparks], I was kind of attempting a concept album about the suburbs of England, or at least trying to capture a vague approximation of suburban life. This idea succeeds in "Saturday Nite Is Dead" and "Local Girls" particularly well. I guess I drifted off the mark there for the rest of the record because the concept turned out to be a little confining for a whole album.

== Music ==
Diffuser.fm's Dave Swanson describes the song as "a real raver." Parker called it a "pretty angry song" that was "delivered in a very angry way." He elaborated, "Attitude is what's behind it. If you sing in a sort of wimpy attitude, that shows you've been distorted by getting old, that shows you've mellowed, more than the specifics of the songs."

== Release and reception ==
"Saturday Nite Is Dead" was first released on Parker's fourth studio album, Squeezing Out Sparks, in March 1979. The song was not released as a single. It also appears on the compilation album Master Hits: Graham Parker.

John M. Borack of Goldmine stated in an interview with Parker that he "always liked" the song. Dave Swanson of Diffuser.fm ranked the song as the second best Parker song, calling it "perfection in action" and stating, "This full-on rocker stands as a testament to the power and urgency of the Rumour in their prime. Straight ahead, no frills, traditional rock 'n' roll, delivered full steam ahead, 'Saturday Nite Is Dead' was one of many high points on the fourth GP album. The Rumour tear it up while Graham spits it out."

Parker has said the track is misunderstood, explaining,

Yeah, that one says a lot which people didn't get, either. It's really about seeing through illusions in many ways and growing up, and people take it literally. They played it in Los Angeles late at night, and this one DJ got on after and said, "Saturday Night Is Dead" from Graham Parker, well, I think he's got to be a little kooky." He really thought I was just talking about Saturday night being dead! That really made me uptight and I've been uptight since then. I thought, "Well [laughs], that's a lot of fuel for me, that comment." I'm still pissed off about that.
