= Passion Is No Ordinary Word =

1979 song by Graham Parker

Song by Graham Parker

from the album Squeezing Out Sparks
- Released: March 1979
- Recorded: Lansdowne Studios, London
- Genre: Rock; new wave
- Label: Vertigo (UK & Europe); Arista (USA & Canada)
- Songwriter(s): Graham Parker
- Producer(s): Jack Nitzsche

"Passion Is No Ordinary Word" is a song by British rock musician Graham Parker, recorded with his backing band the Rumour. The song was released on his 1979 album, Squeezing Out Sparks. Written about faking one's emotion, the song features a stripped-down arrangement.

Though not released as a single, the song has since become one of Parker's most famous songs. The song has seen critical acclaim and Parker has named it as one of his favorites from the album.

== Background ==
Parker attributed the song's power to the song's ascending guitar line, stating, "Those ascending chords provided the push. It's great when you come up with those chords. That guitar riff is so lonely, so yearning." Parker noted the song's stripped-back style as symbolic of the album's musical direction as a whole, stating, "In the past, I occasionally found the music running away with itself, and I was fighting in the middle of it. This time I wanted it to be absolutely direct – the whole thing like a heartbeat. All the riffs, like in 'Passion,' I wrote them with the songs. We didn't elaborate on them much".

Lyrically, the song was described by writer Geoff Cabin as "rail[ing] against artificiality and false emotions". When asked about the song's implications about faked emotion, Parker responded, "People are dull, aren't they? People aren't living to their max, or to anywhere near it. They're just drones or clones. Especially in England - they're just walking zombies. They believe what the TV tells them. They're just put in a direction and led there".

Parker later said that the song was "absolutely" one of his favorites from the album. He explained, "That's a biggie. That's a strong one for me. Those lyrics, again, are kind of beyond what I'm capable of. They're up there." Parker later joked that, because of the loss of sharpness that comes with aging, he "will never again grasp those effervescent wraiths of pure cosmic intangibility that forged the almost impossibly profound 'Passion Is No Ordinary Word'".

== Release and reception ==
"Passion Is No Ordinary Word" was first released on Parker's fourth studio album, Squeezing Out Sparks, in March 1979. The song also served as the title track to the Parker 1993 compilation album Passion is No Ordinary Word: The Graham Parker Anthology; Parker performed the song on The Late Show with David Letterman that same year to promote the compilation, recalling, "I find [performing on TV] very stressful. ... The only time when I've been any good and represented myself in a way I did not consider ruinous to my career was in my last Letterman performance. I was doing 'Passion Is No Ordinary Word', promoting the Rhino boxed set, and for some strange reason I just nailed that monkey."

Geoff Cabin described the song as "one of Parker's signature anthems". Stephen Thomas Erlewine of AllMusic describes the song as one of the two "centerpieces" of Squeezing Out Sparks, alongside "You Can't Be Too Strong". Erlewine writes that the two songs "indicate that [Parker's] traditionalist musical tendencies are symptomatic of a larger conservative trend. But no one ever said conservatives made poor rock & rollers, and Parker's ruminations over a lost past give him the anger that fuels Squeezing Out Sparks, one of the great rock records of the post-punk era." Critic Geoffrey Himes called the song "the essence of Parker's whole career". The Orlando Sentinel describes the song as "enormously tuneful".

== Covers ==
"Passion Is No Ordinary Word" was covered by New York rock band the Figgs for the Parker tribute album Piss And Vinegar: The Songs Of Graham Parker. The Figgs, made up of lifelong Parker fans, served as Parker's backing band in the late 1990s and early 2000s after meeting in a dressing room when both were on tour separately. Guitarist Mike Gent recalled, "My dad bought those records, Howlin' Wind and Heat Treatment, when they came out, so I've been listening to this music almost my whole life."
