= Johnny Are You Queer? =

1981 single by Josie Cotton

Single by Josie Cotton

from the album Convertible Music
- B-side: "(Let's Do) The Blackout"
- Released: 1981
- Studio: Salty Dog (Van Nuys); Ocean Way (Los Angeles)
- Genre: New wave
- Length: 2:45
- Label: Bomp!
- Songwriters: Bobby Paine; Larson Paine
- Producers: Bobby Paine; Larson Paine

Josie Cotton singles chronology
"Johnny Are You Queer?" (1981)	"He Could Be the One" (1982)

"Johnny Are You Queer?" (also "Johnny, Are You Queer?") is a 1980s song credited to the writing team of Bobby and Larson Paine. It was first performed live by the Go-Go's, and eventually recorded by Josie Cotton, who released the song as a single in 1981 and 1982, and as part of her 1982 album Convertible Music. The song was featured on the Valley Girl and Jackass Number Two soundtracks.

== Credits ==
The song's music was based on "Fetch Me One More Beer" by the Los Angeles-based punk rock band Fear, written by the band's guitarist Philo Cramer and John Clancy. Bobby and Larson Paine, who were managing the Go-Go's, reworked the song with new lyrics and gave it to them, but after a falling out forbade them from playing it and gave it to Josie Cotton. In several interviews, Cotton has suggested that the song's title was lifted from lyrics in the Fear song, though she has also stated that Fear's version went "You're a fuckin' queer."

When Fear found out a variation of their song had become popular, they met with the Paines to discuss the publishing rights and together decided that the rights would go to the winner of a coin toss, which the Paines won.

== Premise ==
The song's lyrics are written from the perspective of a young woman who is questioning her relationship with the titular Johnny. He had approached the unnamed woman and asked her on a date, only for him to spend most of his time with his friends and with various men she believes are homosexual. Because of this and Johnny's apparent ambivalence toward her, she questions Johnny's sexuality, asking him if he is ultimately queer.

== Music video ==
A music video for "Johnny Are You Queer?" was produced in the 1980s. It shows Cotton and Johnny sitting on a park bench where she makes romantic advances, much to Johnny's discomfort.

== Critical reception ==
The song was the subject of controversy upon its release. Cotton was accused of promoting homosexuality, and one network claimed that "there was no Josie Cotton and that she was actually a gay man who was trying to convert unsuspecting straight men into a homosexual lifestyle." The Village Voice and The Advocate were both highly critical of "Johnny, Are You Queer?"; The Village Voice criticized the work in an article titled "Josie, Are You a Bitch?"

Years later AllMusic reviewed the song and noted that "In retrospect, the song sounds rather tame, and throughout, the joke is on the petulant girl, not Johnny: 'he's not interested in her that way, so clearly he must not like girls' is (deliberately) a laughably arrogant premise."

Cotton has stated that since the song's release she has been contacted by several people who thanked her for the song because it helped them come to terms with their own homosexuality.

== Credits and personnel ==
Credits and personnel are adapted from the "Johnny Are You Queer?" single liner notes.

- Josie Cotton – vocals
- Bobby Paine – writer, bass, guitar, electric sitar, producer
- Jimmy Ehinger – piano
- J.B. Frank – synthesizer
- Richard Adelman – drums
- Larson Paine – writer, producer
- Geza X – engineering
- Ray Blair – engineering
- Glenn Feit – engineering

== Charts ==
Peak chart positions of "Johnny Are You Queer?"
Chart (1981–1982)	Peak position
Canada Top Singles (RPM)	8
US Dance Club Songs (Billboard)	38

== Covers and media uses ==
The song was featured on the soundtrack of the 1983 film Valley Girl and is performed in the film by Cotton, along with several other songs. A live version by The Go-Go's later was released on their compilation Return to the Valley of the Go-Go's (1994). The rap group Elephant performed a remix for "Johnny, Are You Queer?", while the band Glass Candy remixed the song with the Shangri-Las' "Give Him a Great Big Kiss". "Johnny Are You Queer?" is also heard in the 2006 film Jackass Number Two, featured on the released soundtrack.

Screeching Weasel covered the song on their 1994 album How to Make Enemies and Irritate People.

It can also be heard in the Glee season 2 episode, "Blame It on the Alcohol", while New Directions are playing spin the bottle in Rachel Berry's basement.
