= 88 Lines About 44 Women =

Single by The Nails

from the EP Hotel for Women
- B-side: "Reel World (Beat Boys & B Girls)"; "Dark Brown"; "Things You Left Behind"
- Released: 1981 (as an EP track); 1984 (as a single)
- Genre: New wave
- Length: 4:47 (original EP version); 4:56 (Mood Swing re-recording)
- Label: Jimboco
- Composer: David Kaufman
- Lyricist: Marc Campbell
- Producer: The Nails

The Nails singles chronology
"Young and Wild/Transcontinental Ska" (1980)	"88 Lines About 44 Women" (1981)	"Let It All Hang Out/Phantom Heart" (1985)

"88 Lines About 44 Women" is a song by the new wave band the Nails. Initially recorded for their 1981 EP Hotel for Women, the song was re-recorded and released on the 1984 debut album Mood Swing. Along with the track "Let It All Hang Out", "88 Lines About 44 Women" peaked at number 46 on the US dance chart in March 1985. Influential New Rock radio station KROQ-FM in Los Angeles was first to champion the originally released single, and was heard in July 1982 playing the song.

== Background and recording ==
Marc Campbell and David Kaufman of The Nails wrote "88 Lines About 44 Women" in a Manhattan loft. The rhythm track on the song was a preprogrammed track on Kaufman's Casio keyboard.

The lyrics describe 44 different women, their habits, and their personalities. Campbell wrote the lyrics to the song and has explained that "some of the women [referenced in the song] are real, some are made up." Much of the song was inspired by women the group had encountered while moving from Boulder, Colorado, to New York City. He wrote the full lyrics in two hours on a manual typewriter, and the band recorded it the next day. The Nails never produced a music video for "88 Lines About 44 Women".

== Release history ==
The song was initially released in 1981 as side 1 of the EP, Hotel for Women; it was later re-recorded for the group's 1984 debut album Mood Swing. The earlier version contained minimal production, a drum machine, and a single droning synthesizer; the later version contained more instrumentation and processing. Some promotional copies of the 7" original version included both the "X-rated" version and a "radio edit" in which language which could not be broadcast per FCC rules was removed in three places; the promo records were never released commercially. Both "88 Lines" and its B-side were digitally remastered and appear on the extended Hotel for Women CD, released in November 2009.

== Critical reception ==
The song has received positive critical reaction. Heather Phares, writing for AllMusic, praised the song's "deadpan" delivery, calling the song "a portrait of the counterculture in the late '70s and early '80s." The song was included on a list 10,001 Songs You Must Download Before You Die in the book 1001 Songs You Must Hear Before You Die.

== Media usage and litigation ==
The song has been included on many compilations, including Just Can't Get Enough: New Wave Hits of the '80s, Richard Blade's Flashback Favorites, and Living in Oblivion: The 80's Greatest Hits. The song was also used in a 1998 TV commercial for Mazda. The ad won a Clio Award.

The Nails filed several lawsuits over use of "88 Lines About 44 Women", including a successful lawsuit over use of the song to promote the television show Dexter; the group also unsuccessfully attempted to sue the state of Massachusetts for their use of a similar song in an anti-drinking campaign. Lead singer Marc Campbell stated that the only money the group ever made with the song was from commercials and lawsuits.

== Parodies ==
In 1997, parody musician The great Luke Ski recorded a parody entitled "88 Lines About 44 Simpsons", a song about The Simpsons, each line about a different Simpsons character.

In 1999, David Nielsen of The Brunching Shuttlecocks recorded a parody entitled "88 Lines About 42 Presidents" about the Presidents of the United States through Bill Clinton.

In 1998 and 1999 a parody of the song was used in two television advertisements for the Mazda Protege

== Track listing ==
Early pressing

1. "88 Lines About 44 Women" - 4:32
2. "Reel World (Beat Boys & B Girls)" - 5:00

1984 pressing

1. "88 Lines About 44 Women" - 4:32
2. "Dark Brown" — 5:25

1984 X-Rated Version

1. "88 Lines About 44 Women (X-rated version)" - 4:57
2. "88 Lines About 44 Women (radio edit)" — 4:52

1992 repressing

1. "88 Lines About 44 Women" - 4:32
2. "Things You Left Behind" - 4:03

== Chart positions ==
Chart (1985)	Peak position
US Hot Dance Club Play (Billboard)	46
