= DFX2 (band) =

DFX2 was a San Diego, California based band in the 1980s. Led by twin brothers Douglas Farage (vocals and rhythm guitar) and David Farage (lead guitar and vocals), the band's name was derived from their initials: D.F. times two (x 2). The band's other members were Frank Hailey (drums) and Eric Gotthelf (bass) (who replaced John Avery and Matthew Pray respectively after the release of their first EP, "Where Are They Now"). Though marketed as a new wave band, DFX2 was heavily influenced by the sound of the Rolling Stones.

DFX2 released two EPs, and their songs "Emotion" and "Maureen" were minor hits. The videos for the songs received extensive airplay on MTV. The band officially broke up in 1989. "Emotion", although recorded live at the Spirit Club in San Diego, received heavy airplay on the L.A. radio station KROQ, eventually climbing to #1 by request.

Since then, the Farage brothers have continued to work with the Beat Farmers, Mojo Nixon, and other performers. Matthew Pray went on to found Laws of Motion, and Burning Bridges, and later joined the performance art band Barefoot Hockey Goalie.

== Discography ==
All releases U.S. except where noted

=== E.P.’s ===
- 1980 Where Are They Now? – World Records
- 1983 Emotion – MCA Records
- 1987 Maureen - Music Action - (French edition of "Emotion" EP with new cover and song order)

=== Singles ===
- 1979 - "I Love My Car / You're So Cold" - Double Trouble Records Company
- 1983 - "Maureen / Something's Always Happening" - MCA (also released in Canada)
- 1983 - "Maureen / Maureen" - MCA (12" promo only release, also released as promo in Canada)
- 1983 - "Emotion / Something's Always Happening" - MCA (also released in Canada)
- 1983 - "Emotion / Emotion" (12" promo only release, also released as promo in Canada)
- 1987 - "Maureen / Emotion" - Music Action (France only release)

=== Albums ===
- 1983 BBC Radio 1 #441 - London Wavelength (promotional only radio show)
- 2010 Anthology: Emotion – Fuel 2000

=== Compilation album appearances ===
- 1982 Who's Listening – Government Records - includes "Emotion"
- 1995 Just Can't Get Enough: New Wave Hits of the '80s, Vol. 11 – Rhino Records – includes "Emotion"

== Quote ==
"I'll rock and roll 'til I fall down," shouts Douglas Farage in his best Jaggeresque drawl, and darn if you don't believe every word.

— Roy Trakin, Creem, November 1983
