= A Woman's Got the Power =

Studio album by the A's
- Released: 1981
- Genres: Rock, new wave, power pop
- Label: Arista
- Producers: Rick Chertoff, Nick Garvey

The A's chronology
The A's (1979)	A Woman's Got the Power (1981)	Four Dances (1982)

A Woman's Got the Power is the second and final album by the American band the A's, released in 1981. The title track was released as the first single. The album peaked at No. 146 on the Billboard 200. The A's supported it with a North American tour.

== Production ==
The album was produced by Rick Chertoff and Nick Garvey, who oversaw the final three tracks the band recorded for the disc. Its songs were written by bandmembers Richard Bush and Rocco Notte, who were influenced by the work of Holland–Dozier–Holland. Clive Davis, the president of the band's label, Arista Records, asked the A's to record a version of Tom Jans's "When the Rebel Comes Home". The title track, which was the last song recorded, after the band asked for more studio time, references the Doobie Brothers' "What a Fool Believes". The band used a banjo and saxophone on "Heart of America". "Little Mistakes" uses a Phil Spector sound on its ironic treatment of a teenage tragedy song.

== Critical reception ==
Professional ratings
Review scores
Source	Rating
The Buffalo News	3.5/5 stars
The Columbian	2/4 stars
The Encyclopedia of Popular Music	3/5 stars
Omaha World-Herald	3.5/5 stars
The Philadelphia Inquirer	4/5 stars
Quad-City Times	3.5/5 stars
The New Rolling Stone Record Guide	3/5 stars

The Boston Globe praised the "sly irony" of the A's and said that they "are fitting their slightly cracked vision of the disposable generation to the sort of music teenagers, AM radio listeners and part-time rock fans can understand." The Staten Island Advance noted the band's "exuberance of high spirits confronting musical traditions and styles with honest talent and irreverence", and opined, "Sometimes it's hard to tell if their intentions are parody, pastiche or simply an attempt to cash in on somebody else's formula." The Buffalo News admired "the slick pop brashness".

The Philadelphia Inquirer concluded that the Springsteen influence was almost too blatant but the songs were stronger than the ones on the band's debut. The Quad-City Times said that the album was a combination of new wave, power pop, and "mainstream" rock. Knight Ridder called it "a great record by an unhyped band". The Detroit Free Press considered A Woman's Got the Power "perhaps the most underrated rock release of the year." Trouser Press dismissed the album as "an exercise in misplaced bombast."

== Track listing ==
No.	Title	Length
1.	"A Woman's Got the Power"
2.	"Electricity"
3.	"Heart of America"
4.	"How Do You Live"
5.	"When the Rebel Comes Home"
6.	"Johnny Silent"
7.	"Little Mistakes"
8.	"Working Man"
9.	"I Pretend She's You"
10.	"Insomnia"
