= The Nails =

American new wave band

The Nails were originally a five-piece new wave band that formed in Boulder, Colorado in 1976. In Colorado, they were originally named The Ravers. The band members were Marc Campbell (lead vocals, guitar), Dave Kaufman (keyboards), Al Leis (drums), Artie Freeman (lead guitar), and Jon Cormany (bass). The band's roadie, Eric Boucher, went on to be known as Jello Biafra, lead singer of the Dead Kennedys.

== History ==
In 1977, the Ravers recorded an EP in Boulder with Screwball Records. The Ravers moved to New York in June 1977 and played the showcase clubs CBGB and Max's Kansas City. Shortly after arriving in NY, The Ravers changed their name to The Nails (there was a local band named Raver). A 45 with the band's original lineup was recorded in New York City in 1978. By mid-1978, Leis (now deceased), Cormany, and Freeman (now a medical school professor) had left the band.

By the late 1970s, The Nails had established themselves on the club circuit and were now composed of Campbell and Dave Kaufman, along with bassist George Kaufman (Dave's brother), saxophonist Douglas Guthrie, and drummer Tommy Cotogna. Hotel for Women, an EP recorded in 1981, contained an early version of "88 Lines About 44 Women", a song that caught the attention of RCA. The Nails were signed to RCA by Bruce Harris, also known for bringing The Clash to America. In 1984, the group, with new guitarist Steve O'Rourke in tow, re-recorded "88 Lines About 44 Women" for RCA, who included it on The Nails' full-length debut LP, Mood Swing. The re-recorded version did not feature a live drummer, as Cotogna had left the band at this point (drummer Dennis McDermott performed on the remaining tracks on Mood Swing). The song received regular airplay despite a number of double entendres and lyrical references to masturbation and sadomasochism.

Two years later, with new drummer Mike Ratti firmly established in the band, they released Dangerous Dreams, also on RCA. Both Mood Swing and Dangerous Dreams made the Billboard top 200 album chart and were critically acclaimed. However, following the release of Dangerous Dreams, The Nails left RCA, who consequently did not release either LP on compact disc. "88 Lines About 44 Women" continued to appear on compilations 20 years after its release and was featured in a Mazda television commercial that aired in the late 1990s.

In 1988, the band reconvened (without Guthrie and Dave Kaufman) to record a third album, Corpus Christi, which was not released until 1993 and received little exposure. The Nails deny ever receiving any proceeds from this album, citing a rift with their former producer, claiming that he swindled them out of their rights. They posted re-recordings of these songs on the late George Kaufman's site, along with the explanation of the dispute. They strongly discourage fans from purchasing the album, as they will never be compensated.

In 2007, the band licensed Mood Swing and Dangerous Dreams from RCA parent company Sony-BMG Entertainment and released these albums on compact disc for the first time.

In March 2009, bassist George Kaufman died of complications following heart surgery. He is survived by his wife, Sharla, and his children, Isabel and Michael Kaufman.

Lead vocalist and lyricist Marc Campbell died of a heart attack at his home in Austin, Texas, on December 21, 2024, at the age of 73.

== Discography ==
=== Albums ===
- Mood Swing - 1984
- Dangerous Dreams - 1986
- Corpus Christi - 1993

=== Singles & EPs ===
- "Cops Are Punks / Big Star / Another Lesson" - 1977
- "Back Street Boys / Rock & Roll Show" - 1978
- "Young and Wild / Transcontinental Ska" - 1980
- Hotel for Women - 1981
- "88 Lines About 44 Women" - 1984
- "Let It All Hang Out" - 1985
- "Things You Left Behind" - 1986

=== CD/MP3 reissues ===
- Mood Swing (remastered with bonus tracks) - 2007
- Dangerous Dreams (remastered with bonus tracks) - 2007
- Hotel for Women (remastered with bonus tracks) - 2009
