= I Eat Cannibals =

1982 single by Toto Coelo

Single by Toto Coelo

from the album Man o' War
- B-side: "I Eat Cannibals (Part 2)"
- Released: 1982
- Genre: Tribal rock; new wave; novelty
- Length: 3:30 (Part One); 3:55 (Part Two)
- Label: Radialchoice; Virgin
- Songwriters: Barry Blue; Paul Greedus; Roy Nicolson
- Producer: Barry Blue

Toto Coelo singles chronology
"I Eat Cannibals" (1982)	"Dracula's Tango (Sucker for Your Love)" (1982)

"I Eat Cannibals" is a song by British new wave group Toto Coelo, known as Total Coelo in the United States. The song was written by Paul Greedus, Roy Nicolson, and Barry Blue, who also produced the track. It was included on Toto Coelo's only studio album, Man o' War (1983), and released as the group's debut single in 1982. On the album, the song is split into two parts: Part One appears as the opening track while Part Two closes the album.

"I Eat Cannibals" became a chart hit in several countries, peaking at number two in Sweden, number three in South Africa, number four in Australia and Denmark, and number eight in the United Kingdom. In the United States, the song peaked at number 66 on the Billboard Hot 100 chart, and its music video was nominated for Best Use of Video to Enhance Artists' Image at the Fifth Annual Billboard Music Video Conference.

== Release and promotion ==
"I Eat Cannibals" was released in the United Kingdom in 1982 and in the United States in January 1983. For all the 7-inch singles released outside North America, "I Eat Cannibals" was split into two halves, with Part 1 as the A-side and Part 2 as the B-side. In the United States and Canada, Part 2 was replaced with "Mucho Macho", and was released under the name Total Coelo to avoid confusion with American band Toto. The single was also released on 12-inch vinyl, with the UK, European, and Australian versions containing extended versions of Parts One and Two. The US and Canadian versions include both extended mixes on the A-side, while the B-side features a shorter version of "I Eat Cannibals" plus "Mucho Macho". To promote the song in the UK, Toto Coelo performed it at the Camden Palace during the filming of "Breakout", the pilot episode of a new British rock series.

== Critical reception ==
Writing for Billboard, Leo Sacks called "I Eat Cannibals" "lots of fun" and compared it to Toni Basil's 1982 hit "Mickey". Another writer likened the song to an African version of the Go-Go's' music, while Larry Flick retrospectively called the song a guilty pleasure in 1993.

== Music video ==
A music video directed by Mike Brady and produced by Jon Roseman was filmed for the song. It features Toto Coelo dancing to the song on a stage with tropical props. At the beginning, the stage is lit with a bright white light, but when Toto Coelo member Lacey Bond waves a wand over a balloon, the white light turns off, revealing colourful tubes of light on the props. The video received medium rotation on MTV and was nominated for Best Use of Video to Enhance Artists' Image at the Fifth Annual Billboard Music Video Conference.

== Track listings ==
UK, European, and Australian 7-inch single

A. "I Eat Cannibals (Part 1)" – 3:30
B. "I Eat Cannibals (Part 2)" – 3:55

UK, European, and Australian 12-inch single

A. "I Eat Cannibals (Part 1)" (extended version) – 6:40
B. "I Eat Cannibals (Part 2)" (extended version) – 5:17

US and Canadian 7-inch single

A. "I Eat Cannibals (Part 1)" – 3:28
B. "Mucho Macho" – 3:28

US and Canadian 12-inch single

A1. "I Eat Cannibals (Part 1)" (extended version) – 6:34
A2. "I Eat Cannibals (Part 2)" (extended version) – 5:14
B1. "I Eat Cannibals" (short version) – 3:28
B2. "Mucho Macho" – 4:56

== Charts ==
=== Weekly charts ===
Chart (1982–1983)	Peak position
Australia (Kent Music Report)	4
Denmark (IFPI)	4
Ireland (IRMA)	11
New Zealand (Recorded Music NZ)	38
South Africa (Springbok Radio)	3
Sweden (Sverigetopplistan)	2
UK Singles (OCC)	8
US Billboard Hot 100	66
US Dance/Disco Top 80 (Billboard)	27
US Cash Box Top 100	65

=== Year-end charts ===
Chart (1982)	Position
UK Singles (BMRB)	91

Chart (1983)	Position
South Africa (Springbok Radio)	17
