= Ten Ten (band) =

American new wave band

Ten Ten were an American new wave band formed in Richmond, Virginia in 1984. The band was composed of guitarist/vocalist Mark Lewis, bassist Peter Bell, keyboardist/guitarist Don Ruzek and drummer Lee Johnson. They are best remembered for their 1986 hit "When it Rains" and their cover of the Plimsouls hit "A Million Miles Away". Some sources say they disbanded in 1988 however according to Peter Bell they continued to play as a three piece without Don Ruzek in local Richmond, VA clubs for a few years until around 1991.

== History ==
Ten Ten's debut album, Ordinary Thinking was released in 1984, on independent record label Generic Records. It was produced by the band, and engineered by Bruce Olson. Ordinary Thinking offered "diabolically good melodic rock from a Virginia quartet with a British accent. The memorable tunes are energetically played with attractive, intricate vocals and arrangements that smoothly blend guitars and synthesizers in almost equal doses." Similar favorable reviews helped Ten Ten snag their major label contract.

The band were mostly compared to British bands by the American press, which is why they chose to sign with a UK label, Chrysalis, and concentrated a good deal of their live energy in England and the rest of Europe. In autumn 1985 they toured with The Waterboys, and in 1986, they toured with Simply Red and later Pete Shelley.

Ten Ten spent the early part of 1986 in a recording studio in the Netherlands making their debut LP with producer Stephen Street. The resulting titled Walk On was released on April 28, 1986. Two singles "When it Rains" and a cover of the new wave hit "A Million Miles Away", were released. Both were available in 7- and 12-inch single formats, and featured non-album B-sides "The Secret Life of Madeline". and "Peace and Love". The music video for "When it Rains" appeared on MTV in the spring of 1986.

Ten Ten disbanded in 1991 after playing club shows for a few years around their hometown, Richmond, VA.

After Ten Ten, Peter Bell played briefly in a cover band called Beat Off Odyssey and then formed another band called New West. Around 1991 Don Ruzek and Lee Johnson formerly of Ten Ten joined New West. In 2014 Peter Bell reunited with a band called The Rage he played in before Ten Ten. Peter Bell died August 6, 2015 around 6:30PM when his vehicle hit a power pole on U.S. 460 near Lynchburg, VA.

Drummer Lee Johnson went on to work for a stage production company in Richmond. Don Ruzek worked as a visual artist, web designer and soundtrack composer.

Mark Troth Lewis went on to record an album in 1991 entitled "Days of Heaven" on Atco Records with the band Pleasure Bombs. Later he played guitars for the New York City modern rock band White Light Motorcade. They released two albums in 2003 and 2005. Mark is currently a producer and songwriter in New York City. He has recorded popular bands such as Flyleaf and been the Front of House Engineer for bands such as Iggy Pop and The Stooges, Bille Joe Armstrong, Tone Loc, Flock of Seagulls, Howard Jones and others.

== Discography ==
=== Albums ===
| Year | Title | US | UK |
|---|---|---|---|
| 1984 | Ordinary Thinking | — | — |
| 1986 | Walk On | — | — |

=== Singles ===
| Year | Title | US | UK |
|---|---|---|---|
| 1986 | "A Million Miles Away" | — | — |
| 1986 | "When It Rains" | — | — |
