= The A's =

US musical group

- Origin: Philadelphia, Pennsylvania, United States
- Genres: Pop rock, power pop, new wave
- Years active: 1978–1982
- Label: Arista
- Past members: Richard Bush; Rick DiFonzo; Rocco Notte; Terry Bortman; Michael Snyder

The A's were an American rock band consisting of Richard Bush (lead vocals), Rick DiFonzo (guitar), Rocco Notte (keyboards), Terry Bortman (bass), and Michael Snyder (drums). Formed in Philadelphia in 1978, the band released two albums on Arista Records: The A's (1979) and A Woman's Got the Power (1981).

== History ==
After building a loyal following in the Philadelphia area as a result of their energetic live shows, the A's signed a contract with Arista Records. The band's self-titled debut album was produced by Rick Chertoff and released in 1979. Trouser Press likened the album to the Boomtown Rats' A Tonic for the Troops in terms of combining "wit, street savvy and relatively intricate hard-pop arrangements." Gary Hill of Allmusic similarly noted the band's fusion of punk "irreverence" with humor. Two singles - "After Last Night" and "Parasite" - were released, but neither they nor the album found commercial success. The A's released their second album, A Woman's Got the Power, in 1981. Also produced by Chertoff, the album entered the U.S. Billboard charts, while the title track peaked at number 18 on the Top Rock Tracks chart and number 26 in Canada. "A Woman's Got the Power" was covered by Clarence Clemons & the Red Bank Rockers on the 1983 album Rescue. In 2004, Philadelphia Weekly ranked the album on its list of the "100 Best Philly Albums of all Time".

The A's, despite adopting a more commercial sound on their second album, were dropped by Arista. The band self-released an extended play (EP), Four Dances, in 1982 before breaking up. In the subsequent years, singer Richard Bush continued to perform with other bands and eventually formed The Peace Creeps. Guitarist Rick DiFonzo became a session musician for such artists as Bob Dylan, Cyndi Lauper, Roger Waters, and Joan Osborne.

Rocco Notte died from pancreatic cancer on July 26, 2025, at the age of 72.

== Discography ==
=== Studio albums ===
Title	Album details	Peak chart positions
Title	Album details	US
The A's	Released: 1979; Label: Arista; Format: LP	—
A Woman's Got the Power	Released: 1981; Label: Arista; Format: LP	146
"—" denotes release that has not charted.

=== Extended plays ===
Title	Extended play details
Four Dances	Released: 1982; Label: Strait A's; Format: EP

=== Singles ===
Title	Year	Peak chart positions			Album
Title	Year	US	US Main. Rock	CAN	Album
"After Last Night"	1979	—	—	—	The A's
"Parasite"	1979	—	—	—	The A's
"A Woman's Got the Power"	1981	106	18	26	A Woman's Got the Power
"—" denotes release that has not charted.
