= Local Girls =

1979 song by Graham Parker

Single by Graham Parker

from the album Squeezing Out Sparks
- B-side: "I Want You Back (Alive)"
- Released: July 1979
- Recorded: Lansdowne Studios, London
- Genre: Rock, new wave
- Label: Arista
- Songwriter(s): Graham Parker
- Producer(s): Jack Nitzsche

Graham Parker singles chronology
"Discovering Japan" (1979)	"Local Girls" (1979)	"I Want You Back (Alive)" (1979)

"Local Girls" is a song by British rock musician Graham Parker, recorded with his backing band the Rumour. The song was released on his 1979 album, Squeezing Out Sparks.

Lyrically inspired by the girls in Parker's hometown, "Local Girls" was meant to capture life in English suburbia. The song was released as a single in the US in 1979, but did not chart. The song has since become one of Parker's most famous songs.

== Background ==
"Local Girls" was written by Graham Parker as a commentary on the girls from his youth that were attracted to soldiers at an army camp near his town; Parker recalled in an interview, "You might fancy some local girls, but you know there's no chance. She thinks you're just a local kid that everybody knows". He later said in an interview on his website,

"'Local Girls,' of course, refers to the girls in my/your hometown, not the girls in someone else's town. ... The idea for 'Local' is from remembering what it was like to be a boy at home, looking out the window, seeing a rather toothsome piece stroll by, nose in the air perhaps, down the quiet semi-detached suburban street, and knowing that she probably already (at 13/14 years of age) fancies herself as an army wife (I grew up next door to an army camp and the squaddies were always stealing the girlfolk) and is going to look upon your feeble advances with some disdain. It's a fairly typical the-object-of-ones-desire-is-always-out-of-reach-type song, just about 30 times better and more pregnant with meaning/detail than pretty much anyone else on the planet could even begin to aspire to, is all".

The song was originally written as a part of a larger concept on the Squeezing Out Sparks album to capture suburban life in England. He commented on this, "In [Squeezing Out Sparks] I was kind of attempting a concept album about the suburbs of England, or at least trying to capture a vague approximation of suburban life. This idea succeeds in "Saturday Nite Is Dead" and "Local Girls" particularly well. I guess I drifted off the mark there for the rest of the record because the concept turned out to be a little confining for a whole album. I'm too restless to stick with such a narrow program".

== Release ==
"Local Girls" was released as the first and only US single from Squeezing Out Sparks, backed with a live version of the Jackson 5's "I Want You Back." According to radio personality T. Morgan, then a member of the staff of Arista Records, the song was intended to be Parker's breakthrough hit on Arista; he recalled, "'Local Girls' was the choice to be the single to take Graham Parker to new vistas. It was to be his first hit single. We sent lovely ladies (all local) to the radio stations to hand deliver the record." A promotion for the song in Birmingham, Alabama saw Arista reps dress up as women on stage. However, despite promising regional radio play, the song failed to chart. While the single was unsuccessful on the charts, the Squeezing Out Sparks album ultimately proved to be Parker's most successful album in the US and the song has become, in the words of Chronogram's Peter Aaron, Parker's "signature hit".

A music video for the song was also created, featuring Parker and the Rumour performing in a living room set.

=== Live versions ===
Parker and the Rumour have continued to play "Local Girls" live, including during their reunion in the 2010s. The band played a version of the song in a concert for Judd Apatow's movie This Is 40, although it did not make to the theatrical release, it was later included on the extended "uncut" version on the home media release. This performance of "Local Girls" was later debuted on Diffuser.fm and, with the rest of the concert, was released by Shout! Factory.

== Cover versions ==
A supergroup consisting of Pat DiNizio, Gary Lucas, and Frank Black covered "Local Girls" for a Graham Parker tribute album entitled Piss & Vinegar: The Songs of Graham Parker. When asked about Black, Parker responded, "I like the Pixies. ... [He] must be one hell of a dude".
