= The Avant Gardeners =

English new wave band

The Avant Gardeners were a new wave band influenced by 1960s psychedelic rock, originally from Okehampton, Devon, but soon moving to London, England, formed in 1977, initially as The Avant Gardener.

The Avant Gardener's line-up was initially Russell Murch (vocals, guitar), Martin Sanders (guitar), Nigel Rae (bass), and Mike Kelly (drums). Their first release was a self-titled EP on Virgin Records in 1977, after which they split up. One track, Strange Gurl in Clothes, from the EP were included on Virgin's new wave showcase compilation Guillotine. Murch reformed the band in 1980 as The Avant Gardeners, with new musicians Mike Roberts (guitar) and Rob Hill (bass), along with a series of guest drummers. More popular in continental Europe than their home country, the new line-up released two albums, 1980's Dig It and 1984's The Church of the Inner Cosmos on the Italian Appaloosa label, and a 7-inch EP, before again splitting.

== Discography ==
=== Singles/EPs ===
- The Avant Gardener EP (1977) Virgin
- "Deadwood Stage" (1983) Speed

=== Albums ===
- Dig It (1980) Appaloosa
- The Church of the Inner Cosmos (1984) Appaloosa
