= Killer Pussy =

American satirical punk rock group

Killer Pussy was a satirical punk rock/new wave group from Phoenix, Arizona. They are best known for their 1982 song "Teenage Enema Nurses in Bondage".

== History ==
Lucy LaMode, who eventually became Killer Pussy's lead singer, became a fan of punk rock following high school and found herself moonlighting in a Phoenix punk band called "The Roll-Ons" with Les a Go Go singing about pantyhose and feminine hygiene. The Roll-Ons" were backed by Feederz drummer John E. Precious. LaMode met musician Robert X. Planet and began bonding over singer and actress Edith Massey who was part of the John Waters ensemble. Planet later joined the group, as well as guitarist Gary Russell and bassist Dale B. Sari. The expanded group "Killer Pussy" was named after Les a Go Go's cat. Their first EP Teenage Enema Nurses in Bondage was produced by and recorded by Bruce Liddil at Behemoth Studio.

The group became fixtures of the early-80s Phoenix punk scene, where the group became noted for its kitsch. They sang "off-the-wall, "wacky", "smutty" joke songs such as "Pocket Pool", "Dildo Desire" and "Herpes". The group's attire and stage background parodied punk acts.

In May 1982, a hastily recorded four song EP was released. "Teenage Enema Nurses in Bondage" from the EP was soon the second most played song on Los Angeles radio station KROQ. Their popularity continued to grow during a California tour. The band then made a television appearance on USA Network's New Wave Theatre via their manager at the time, Scott Hatch. Actor Dennis Hopper, a fan of the group, painted a portrait of Lucy LaMode that was prominently displayed on the sitcom Square Pegs. A full-length album Bikini Wax along with a single "Moist Towelette", which was a parody of Grace Jones' cover of "Warm Leatherette", was then released.

John E. Precious died in September 1983. During the rest of the 1980s and early 1990s the group occasionally toured and worked on reissues of their back catalog.

In 2010, they played their 30th anniversary concert in Phoenix.

In 2014, Teenage Enema Nurses In Bondage was ranked #9 in the "10 Most Influential Punk Records of Arizona".

Gary Russell died on April 24, 2017. Robert X. Planet died in his sleep on January 5, 2025 at the age of 74.

== Personal lives ==
Despite Lucy LaMode's self-described "whore" public persona, she remained a virgin during the height of the group's popularity. She was not a drug user, did not have her first beer until the age of 26, and is now a mother.

Dale B. Sari currently lives in Scottsdale, Arizona.

== See also ==
- The Rhino Brothers Present the World's Worst Records, album which includes "Teenage Enema Nurses in Bondage"
