= The Little Girls =

American band

- Origin: San Fernando, California, United States
- Genres: New wave, novelty, indie
- Years active: 1983–1985
- Label: ValleyPOP Records
- Past members: Caron Maso; Michele Maso; Kip Brown

The Little Girls was a novelty band formed by the sisters Caron Maso (guitar, vocals) and Michele Maso (vocals) from the San Fernando Valley in Los Angeles in the early 1980s. Kip Brown (lead guitar, vocals), Steve Sicular (guitar) and Jeff Fair (drums) comprised the band.

They had two hits, "Earthquake Song" and "How to Pick Up Girls". Both of these songs were hits on KROQ, an album-oriented rock radio station in the Los Angeles market that played new wave almost exclusively at that time. “Earthquake Song” was also featured in a dance segment running 12 weeks on Dick Clark’s American Bandstand on the ABC television network. They opened for many well-known acts such as The Call, The Plimsouls, The Boomtown Rats, Billy Idol, Janis Ian, and The Pretenders. Their only release, the Mini-LP Thank Heaven! was released in 1983, co-produced by famed Ramones and Mick Jagger producer Ed Stasium. The music video for "How to Pick Up Girls" (also directed by Stasium) was aired on MTV.

In 2004, the band reunited for a one-time-only show in Santa Monica, California.

== Discography ==
- The Podolor-Cooper Sessions, 1982
- Thank Heaven! Mini-LP, 1983
- The Clear Album EP, 1985
- No More Vinyl....., 2006
- Thank Heaven For Valleypop: The Original and Previous Unreleased Versions Recorded 1980–1985, 2009 (released and unreleased versions of Thank Heaven! and The Clear Album)
- Today and Yesterday, 2009 (2006 reunion recordings with rarities from the 1980s)
