= Toto Coelo =

British new wave group

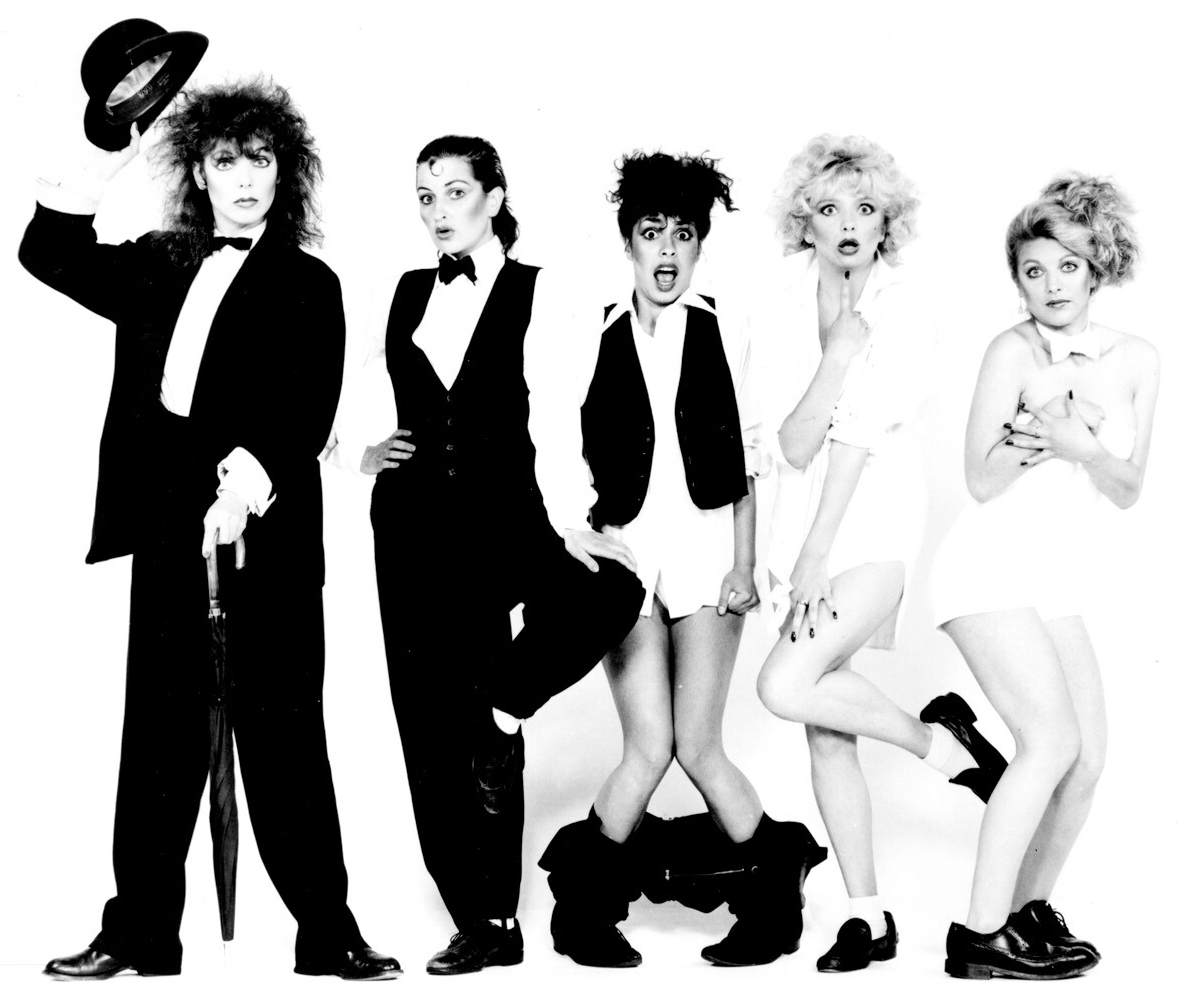
- Toto Coelo c. 1983. Left to right: Sheen Doran, Ros Holness, Anita Mahadevan, Lacey Bond, Lindsey Danvers

Background information
- Also known as: Total Coelo
- Origin: United Kingdom
- Genres: New wave; synth-pop; dance-pop
- Years active: 1981–1985
- Labels: Radicalchoice, Virgin, Powderworks, Chrysalis, Debut Edge
- Past members: Sheen Doran; Anita Mahadevan; Lacey Bond; Lindsey Danvers; Ros Holness

Toto Coelo (renamed Total Coelo in the US) was a 1980s British pop group, founded by producer Barry Blue. The original members were singers Anita Mahadevan, Lacey Bond, Lindsey Danvers, Ros Holness (daughter of television presenter Bob Holness) and Sheen Doran.

== Career ==
Originally formed in 1981, one of the group's first recordings was "Videotheque", a Buggles number written and produced by Trevor Horn. The track became a hit for Dollar in 1982, while the Toto Coelo version remains unreleased. Another early track, "World of Automation", is also unreleased.

The group is most known for the 1982 hit single "I Eat Cannibals", which reached No. 8 in the UK Singles Chart and was a top 5 hit in Australia, South Africa, and Sweden. "I Eat Cannibals" also charted in the US, where it peaked at No. 66 in April 1983. The follow-up single, "Dracula's Tango (Sucker For Your Love)", reached the top 20 in Australia and top 10 in Sweden. The group's only studio album, 1983's Man o' War, was not a commercial success, charting highest in Sweden at No. 46. A third single, "Milk from the Coconut", was released from the album and peaked at No. 4 in South Africa. Following the album, Anita Mahadevan and Sheen Doran left the group.

The band was briefly featured in the unreleased horror film Grizzly II: The Predator, performing "Milk from the Coconut" in a few scenes of the rock concert. In 2020, the film was completed and released under the title Grizzly II: Revenge, with scenes featuring the band performing "Milk from the Coconut", "Man of War", "Automation" and "Calories".

In 1985, the remaining three members released two further singles, "Girls Night Out" and "Gimme Some Lovin'", neither of which charted.

Lacey, Lindsey and Ros performed as the backing singers for the Bruce Foxton Band in 1985. They feature prominently on the 'Live in London' performance filmed at the Camden Palace, which has been released on video (Dubious, 1986) and DVD (SFM, 2012).

The group's name is Latin and means "by the whole extent of the heavens" or "heaven-wide", but is commonly translated as "completely", "entirely" or "utterly". Of the name, Sheen Doran said, "It has a number of meanings, such as 'heart and soul', 'root and branch' and 'totally different'. It seemed to describe what we were. Plus, it's strange-sounding and hard to pronounce, so it sticks in your mind". The group was renamed Total Coelo in the United States to avoid confusion with the American rock group Toto.

=== After Toto Coelo ===
- Lacey Bond - Bond later became a television and film actress.
- Lindsey Danvers - Danvers became an actress, appearing in theatre and film.
- Sheen Doran - Doran later joined Wall Street Crash from 1984 until 1985, when she was forced to stop singing due to illness.
- Anita Mahadevan - Mahadevan later changed her name to Anita Chellamah, and formed Cherry Bombz with several former members of Hanoi Rocks, including Andy McCoy. She is now known as Anita Chellamah-Nurse and works as a television actress and presenter.

== Discography ==
=== Studio albums ===
- Man o' War (1983) – AUS No. 82, SWE No. 46

There are later re-recordings of the tracks but the original 1982 album can be found on the Hallmark UK 1995 CD 'I Eat Cannibals and Other Delicious Hits'.

=== Compilation albums ===
- I Eat Cannibals & Other Tasty Trax (1996) (issued on CD in the US on the Razor & Tie record label, containing all of the Man o' War tracks, plus the bonus track "Weird", and 12" vinyl versions of "I Eat Cannibals" and "Milk from the Coconut")

=== Singles ===
Year	Single	Peak positions								Album
Year	Single	UK	AUS	IRE	NZ	SA	SWE	US Hot 100	US Dance	Album
1982	"I Eat Cannibals"	8	4	11	38	3	2	66	27	Man o' War
1982	"Dracula's Tango (Sucker for Your Love)"	54	19	29	—	—	8	—	—	Man o' War
1983	"Milk from the Coconut"	102	100	—	—	4	—	—	—	Man o' War
1985	"Girls Night Out"	—	—	—	—	—	—	—	—	Non-album singles
1985	"Gimme Some Lovin'"	—	—	—	—	—	—	—	—	Non-album singles
"—" denotes releases that did not chart or were not released.
