= Josie Cotton =

American singer

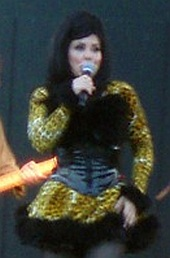
- Cotton performing in 2007

Background information
- Born: Josie Jones; 1956 (age 69–70); Dallas, Texas, U.S.
- Genres: Pop rock; new wave
- Occupations: Singer; songwriter
- Instrument: Vocals
- Website: josiecotton.com

Josie Cotton (born Josie Jones; 1956) is an American pop/rock singer, best known for "Johnny Are You Queer?" and "He Could Be the One" from 1982. "Johnny Are You Queer?" was used on the soundtracks to Jackass Number Two (2006) and Valley Girl (1983). "He Could Be the One" was also used in Valley Girl.

== Career ==
Born Josie Jones in Dallas, Texas, Cotton sang with Dallas bands and then moved to Los Angeles, California. She met Larson Paine in Hollywood, and the two began dating. Larson and his brother Bobby gave her "Johnny, Are You Queer?", previously performed live by The Go-Go's, to record as a demo. After the first label to sign her folded, Bomp! Records released the song as a single.

The performance of the single attracted the attention of Elektra Records, which re-released the single and a full album, with the future Kingdom Come member Johnny B Frank on keyboards, in 1982. The Convertible Music LP has music reminiscent of the 1960s girl group tradition. Cotton made an appearance in the 1983 film Valley Girl, singing "Johnny, Are You Queer?", "He Could Be the One" and "School Is In" during the film's prom scene. In 1984, Elektra issued Cotton's follow-up album, From the Hip, which returned a minor hit with the cover of Looking Glass' "Jimmy Loves Maryann" (with guitar by Lindsey Buckingham). In 1986, Cotton appeared in a minor role as the character Silver Ring in the John McTiernan horror film Nomads opposite Adam Ant and Pierce Brosnan. "Johnny Are You Queer?" was later used in Jackass Number Two during the "Anaconda Ballpit" stunt. The punk band Screeching Weasel covered the song on their 1994 album How to Make Enemies and Irritate People.

In 1993, Cotton recorded Frightened by Nightingales (as Josey Cotton), a collection of songs by the songwriter/violinist/self promoter Bill Rhea. Continuing to work behind the scenes, Cotton co-founded B-Girl Records, which issued recordings by Goldenboy and Alaska!. An album of her own music, The Influence of Fear on Salesmen, was planned for release in 2002 on B-Girl but failed to materialize under that title. Cotton released Movie Disaster Music in 2006, followed by Invasion of the B-Girls, a collection of B-movie theme song covers, also produced in part by Bill Rhea, in 2007. Building on the critical success for these recordings, Cotton released Pussycat Babylon in late 2010. As of May 2018, "Johnny Are You Queer" ranks at No. 80 on VH1's list of the Top 100 Greatest One Hit Wonders of the 80s.

This Wikipedia article once erroneously listed her birth name as Kathleen Josey, so she was asked where Cotton came from in a 2009 interview with Magnet Magazine: "I was actually born Josie Jones. My mother kept marrying and taking her maiden name back – she was married six times. Cotton is actually a family name from way back."

== Discography ==
=== Studio albums ===
- Convertible Music – 1982, Elektra Records (Number 147 on the Billboard Top LPs & Tapes chart)
- From the Hip – 1984, Elektra
- Frightened by Nightingales – 1993, Silences (France; 1996 U.S. release on Roxco Records)
- Movie Disaster Music – 2006, Scruffy Records
- Invasion of the B-Girls – 2007, Scruffy
- Pussycat Babylon – 2010, Scruffy
- Everything Is Oh Yeah – 2019, Kitten Robot/Cleopatra Records (recorded in 1986)
- Day of the Gun – 2023, Kitten Robot

=== Compilations ===
- Convertible Music/From the Hip (double album CD reissue) – 2002, Collectables Records

=== Singles ===
- "Johnny Are You Queer?" (1981, Bomp!)
- "Johnny Are You Queer?" b/w "(Let's Do) The Black-Out" (1981 Elektra Records reissue; number 38 Billboard Disco Top 80)
- "Johnny Are You Queer?" (1982, Quality Q-2403-M; number nine in Canada on RPM 50 singles chart on March 20, 1982)
- "He Could Be the One" (1982, Elektra; number 34 Billboard Rock Top Tracks; number 74 Billboard Hot 100 pop singles)
- "Bye, Bye Baby" (1982, Elektra)
- "Jimmy Loves Mary-Anne" (1984, Elektra; number 82 Billboard Hot 100)
- "Johnny R U Queer 2010" (2010, Scruffy Records; number 43 Billboard Dance Club Songs)
- "See the New Hong Kong (Remixes)", (2011, Scruffy; number 12 Billboard Dance Club Songs)
- "Ukrainian Cowboy" (2019, Kitten Robot Records)

== Filmography ==
- Valley Girl (1983)
- Nomads (1986)
- Top Wing (2018)
