= Single Bullet Theory (new wave band) =

American new wave band

- Also known as: X-Breed
- Origin: Richmond, Virginia, U.S.
- Genres: New wave
- Years active: 1976–1982
- Past members: Michael Maurice Garrett; Frank Daniel; Dennis Madigan; Gary Alan Holmes; Michael Muller; Barry Fitzgerald; Davey Wynn; Mudd Herman; Keith MacPhee; Mark Lewis

Single Bullet Theory was an American new wave band from Richmond, Virginia.

== History ==
The band was founded in 1976 under the name X-Breed; the new moniker was adopted after the addition of a guitarist and bassist to the original three-person lineup. They self-released an EP in 1977 and by 1979 were opening for Patti Smith. After landing a song on the Asylum Sharp Cuts compilation album, they signed with Mike Curb Productions, but left the label before releasing any material. In 1982, they signed to CBS Records subsidiary Nemperor and released a full-length album. The single "Keep It Tight" appeared on MTV and reached No. 78 on the Billboard Hot 100. A second single, "Hang On to Your Heart" was test marketed in the United States Virgin Islands and reached No. 1 but CBS pulled all promotion on the band; the single was never released and the group disbanded shortly after.

== Members ==
- Michael Maurice Garrett - vocals, saxophone, guitar
- Frank Daniel - guitar, bass
- Dennis Madigan - drums
- Gary Alan Holmes - guitar
- Michael Muller - bass - vocals
- Barry Fitzgerald - keyboards
- Davey Wynn - bass
- Mudd Herman - guitar
- Keith MacPhee - bass
- Mark Lewis - guitar

Band members changed over the years; the final line-up included Garrett/Madigan/Holmes/Muller and Fitzgerald.

== Discography ==
- Single Bullet Theory EP (Self-released, 1977)
- Single Bullet Theory LP (Nemperor, 1982)
- SBT: 1977-1980 Download Compilation (Free Music Archive, 2010)
- Complete Discography Single Bullet Theory Discography
