= Simpleton (disambiguation) =

A simpleton is a stock character in folklore who lacks common sense.

Simpleton may also refer to:

- Simpleton (reggae musician) (1971–2004), Jamaican reggae artist
- The Simpleton, the 1850 debut novel of Alexei Pisemsky
- The Simpletons, shortened original title of Jude the Obscure
- Simpletons (painting), an 1873 painting by Luke Fildes
- The Simpleton (Messerschmidt), a sculpture by Franz Xaver Messerschmidt

== See also ==
- "Mayor of Simpleton", a 1989 song by British New Wave band XTC
- The Pretended Simpleton, Mozart opera
