= Wildlife Dictionary =

Studio album by Garland Jeffreys
- Released: 1997
- Studio: Power Station, Sony Music Studios, New York City
- Genre: Rock, Reggae
- Label: RCA
- Producer: Garland Jeffreys, Handel Tucker, Peter Zizzo, The Boilerhouse Boys (Ben Wolff and Andy Dean)

Garland Jeffreys chronology
Don't Call Me Buckwheat (1992)	Wildlife Dictionary (1997)	The King of In Between (2011)

Wildlife Dictionary is an album by Garland Jeffreys. It was released in 1997 in Europe only by RCA Records.

== Track listing ==
All tracks composed by Garland Jeffreys; except where indicated

1. "That's My Lover" (Garland Jeffreys, Handel Tucker) - 4:31
2. "Original Lust" - 4:13
3. "Sexuality" (Garland Jeffreys, Joe Dworniak) - 3:58
4. "Temptation" (Alan "Troubleshooter" Freedman, Garland Jeffreys) - 4:30
5. "Boys and Girls" (Garland Jeffreys, Peter Zizzo) - 5:05
6. "Wildlife Dictionary" (Garland Jeffreys, Peter Zizzo) - 4:41
7. "Happiness" - 4:20
8. "Love Jones" (Garland Jeffreys, The Boilerhouse Boys) - 4:13
9. "Afrodiziak" - 4:47
10. "Wet Money" - 4:31
11. "Gotta Get Away From This World" - 3:59
12. "Oceana" - 5:33
13. "Lovetown Serenade" (Garland Jeffreys, Handel Tucker) - 4:12

== Personnel ==
- Garland Jeffreys - lead and backing vocals
- Handel Tucker - organ, piano, synthesizer, drum programming
- Peter Zizzo - piano, organ, keyboards, backing vocals; bass guitar on "Wildlife Dictionary"
- Richard Arrigo - guitar, mandolin
- Pino Palladino - bass guitar
- Jeff Bova - piano, organ
- Sly Dunbar, Steve Jordan - drums, percussion
- Bashiri Johnson - percussion
- Paulette Williams, Cindy Mizelle, Danielle LaMette, Ann Tucker, Debra Miller, Jenni Evans, Robin Clark, Tawatha Agee, Gordon Grody, Claire Jeffreys - backing vocals
- Lloyd "Gitsy" Willis - guitar on "Original Lust"
- Simpleton - toasting on "Original Lust"
- Earl "Wire" Lindo - organ on "Original Lust"
- Robbie Lyn - keyboards on "Original Lust"
- Mark "Led" Ledford - harmony vocals, whistling on "Original Lust"
- David Kahne - guitar on "Sexuality" and "Gotta Get Away from This World"
- Joe Dworniak - piano, synthesizer, programming on "Sexuality"
- Eddie Martinez - guitar on "Sexuality", "Temptation", "Love Jones" and "Afrodiziak"
- Tony Cedras - accordion on "Temptation" and "Oceana"
- Alan Friedman - piano, programming on "Happiness"; loops, piano, bass on "Gotta Get Away from This World"
- Ben Barson - keyboards, programming on "Love Jones"
- Luís Jardim - percussion on "Love Jones"
- Ben Fowler - synthesizer on "Wet Money"
- Chris Champion - loops on "Wet Money"
- Alberto Castro, Bruce "The Pocketbook" Purse - trumpet on "Gotta Get Away from This World"

Technical

- Ben Fowler, Robert Smith - engineer
- Anton Corbijn - photography
