= American Boy & Girl =

Studio album by Garland Jeffreys
- Released: 1979
- Studio: Record Plant, New York City
- Genre: Rock
- Label: A&M
- Producer: Garland Jeffreys

Garland Jeffreys chronology
One-Eyed Jack (1978)	American Boy & Girl (1979)	Escape Artist (1980)

American Boy & Girl is an album by Garland Jeffreys, released on A&M Records in 1979.

The album peaked at No. 151 on the Billboard 200. "Matador" became a hit in Germany, reaching number 2 on the singles chart. It was also a top ten hit in Austria, Holland, Belgium, Switzerland, and France.

== Critical reception ==
Professional ratings
Review scores
Source	Rating
AllMusic	3.5/5 stars
Christgau's Record Guide	B
The Encyclopedia of Popular Music	2/5 stars
The Rolling Stone Album Guide	3.5/5 stars

The New York Times wrote that the album "projects a humanism that's affecting for its steadfast refusal to be fashionable."

== Track listing ==
All tracks composed by Garland Jeffreys

1. "Livin' for Me" - 4:19
2. "Bad Dream" - 2:44
3. "City Kids" - 5:12
4. "American Boy & Girl" - 3:52
5. "Matador" - 4:38
6. "Night of Living Dead" - 4:43
7. "Bring Back the Love" - 3:28
8. "Ship of Fools" - 3:00
9. "Shoot the Moonlight Out" - 3:23
10. "If Mao Could See Me Now" - 5:09

== Personnel ==
- Garland Jeffreys - vocals, guitar, percussion

The Mao Band

- Alan Freedman - acoustic guitar, arrangements
- Rafael Goldfield - bass
- Tim Cappello - keyboards, tenor & soprano saxophone, backing vocals
- Anton Fig - drums, percussion

with:

- Herb Alpert - "drunken" trumpet
- Robert Athas - bass, guitars
- Rory Dodd - harmony vocals
- Paul Prestopino - mandolin
- Eric Troyer - vocals
- Ed Freeman - conductor

Technical

- Terri Kaplan - production coordinator
- Roy Cicala, Sam Ginsberg - engineer
- Carole Langer - design, cover concept
- Lou Lanzano - cover photography
