= Chris Osborne =

Chris Osborne may also refer to:

- Chris Osborne (golfer) in Kentucky Open
- Chris Osborne (musician) on Garland Jeffreys (album)
