= Hugh McCracken =

American guitarist (1942–2013)

- Born: March 31, 1942; Glen Ridge, New Jersey, U.S.
- Died: March 28, 2013 (aged 70) New York City, U.S.
- Genre: Rock
- Occupation: Musician
- Instruments: Guitar; harmonica; mandolin
- Years active: 1960s–2013

Hugh Carmine McCracken (March 31, 1942 – March 28, 2013) was an American rock guitarist and session musician based in New York City, primarily known for his performance on guitar and also as a harmonica player. McCracken was additionally an arranger and record producer.

== Biography ==
Born in Glen Ridge, New Jersey, McCracken grew up in Hackensack, New Jersey.

Especially in demand in the 1960s, 1970s and 1980s, McCracken appeared on many recordings by Steely Dan, as well as albums by Donald Fagen, Jimmy Rushing, Billy Joel, Roland Kirk, Roberta Flack, B. B. King, Hue and Cry, John Lennon, Paul McCartney, the Monkees, Paul Simon, Art Garfunkel, Lotti Golden, Idris Muhammad, James Taylor, Phoebe Snow, Bob Dylan, Linda McCartney, Carly Simon, Graham Parker, Yoko Ono, Eric Carmen, Loudon Wainwright III, Lou Donaldson, Aretha Franklin, Bob James, Jimmy Buffett, Van Morrison, the Four Seasons, Barbra Streisand, Hall & Oates, the Archies, Don McLean, Hank Crawford, Jerry Jemmott, Gary Wright and Andy Gibb.

In the middle 1960s, McCracken played in a North Jersey night club cover band called the Funatics under the stage name of Mack Pierce. The band became Mario & the Funatics for a short time when it merged with saxophonist Mario Madison. He was a member of Mike Mainieri's White Elephant Orchestra (1969–1972), a 20-piece experimental jazz-rock outfit based in New York City. The band was made up of Steve Gadd, Tony Levin, Warren Bernhardt, George Young, Frank Vicari, Michael Brecker, Ronnie Cuber, Jon Faddis, Lew Soloff, Randy Brecker, Barry Rogers, Jon Pierson, David Spinozza and Joe Beck.

Among the many albums he performed on was the 1970 recording by writer/critic Robert Palmer's Insect Trust, Hoboken Saturday Night, together with Bernard "Pretty" Purdie and Elvin Jones. In 1971, because of such high demand for his work, McCracken declined Paul McCartney's invitation to help form his new band, Wings. McCracken also played on, arranged and co-produced with Tommy LiPuma, Dr. John's City Lights (1978) and Tango Palace (1979).

His most well-known work was the slide guitar solo in "All By Myself" by Eric Carmen, the guitar parts in "Hey Nineteen" by Steely Dan, and the main guitar playing fills on Van Morrison classic "Brown-Eyed Girl".

== Death ==
Hugh McCracken died on March 28, 2013 in Manhattan. He was 70. Holly, his wife of 43 years, said the cause was leukemia.

== Discography ==
- 1967: Blowin' Your Mind! – Van Morrison
- 1967: Walk Away Renee/Pretty Ballerina – The Left Banke
- 1968: Did She Mention My Name? – Gordon Lightfoot
- 1968: Eli and the Thirteenth Confession – Laura Nyro
- 1968: The Circle Game – Tom Rush
- 1968: Livin' the Blues – Jimmy Rushing
- 1969: Today – Gloria Loring
- 1969: Completely Well – B.B. King
- 1969: Everything’s Archie – The Archies
- 1969: Motor-Cycle (album) – Lotti Golden
- 1970: A Time To Remember! – The Artie Kornfeld Tree (ABC/Dunhill Records; Cat. DS 50092)
- 1970: Hoboken Saturday Night – The Insect Trust (Atco Records; Cat. SD 33-313)
- 1970: Outlaw – Eugene McDaniels (Atlantic; Cat. SD 8259)
- 1970: Changes – The Monkees
- 1970: Indianola Mississippi Seeds – B.B. King
- 1971: Headless Heroes of the Apocalypse – Eugene McDaniels
- 1971: Ram – Paul McCartney
- 1971: Mike Corbett & Jay Hirsh (with Hugh McCracken) - S/T (Atco Records)
- 1971: Gary Wright - Extraction (A&M Records)
- 1971: Flagrant Délit – Johnny Hallyday (France; Philips; Cat. 6325 003)
- 1971: Quiet Fire – Roberta Flack
- 1971: The Good Book – Melanie
- 1971: Barbra Joan Streisand – Barbra Streisand
- 1972: Album III – Loudon Wainwright III
- 1972: Stoneground Words – Melanie
- 1972: Sweet Buns & Barbeque – Houston Person
- 1972: David Clayton-Thomas – David Clayton-Thomas
- 1972: Young, Gifted and Black – Aretha Franklin
- 1972: Yvonne Elliman – Yvonne Elliman
- 1973: Abandoned Luncheonette – Daryl Hall & John Oates
- 1973: Sassy Soul Strut – Lou Donaldson
- 1973: For the Good Times - Rusty Bryant
- 1973: From the Depths of My Soul – Marlena Shaw
- 1973: Breezy Stories – Danny O'Keefe (Atlantic; Cat. SD 7264)
- 1973: Daybreaks – John Wonderling (Paramount; Cat. 6063)
- 1973: Extension of a Man – Donny Hathaway
- 1973: Bette Midler – Bette Midler
- 1974: Your Baby Is a Lady – Jackie DeShannon
- 1974: With Everything I Feel in Me – Aretha Franklin
- 1974: Madrugada – Melanie
- 1974: Walking Man – James Taylor
- 1974: Until It's Time for You to Go – Rusty Bryant
- 1974: Let Me in Your Life – Aretha Franklin
- 1974: One – Bob James
- 1975: Eric Carmen (1975 album) - Eric Carmen
- 1975: Desire – Bob Dylan
- 1975: Still Crazy After All These Years – Paul Simon
- 1975: Katy Lied - Steely Dan
- 1975: The Case of the 3 Sided Dream in Audio Color - Rahsaan Roland Kirk
- 1975: Feel Like Makin' Love – Roberta Flack
- 1975: New York Connection – Tom Scott
- 1975: First Cuckoo – Deodato
- 1975: Peach Melba – Melba Moore
- 1976: Just a Matter of Time – Marlena Shaw
- 1976: Yellow & Green – Ron Carter
- 1976: Second Childhood – Phoebe Snow
- 1976: Everything Must Change – Randy Crawford
- 1976: Pastels – Ron Carter
- 1976: Smile – Laura Nyro
- 1976: Three – Bob James
- 1977: Havana Candy – Patti Austin
- 1977: The Stranger – Billy Joel
- 1977: Blue Lights in the Basement – Roberta Flack
- 1977: A Song – Neil Sedaka
- 1977: Never Letting Go – Phoebe Snow
- 1977: Celebrate Me Home – Kenny Loggins
- 1977: Watermark – Art Garfunkel
- 1977: Blow It Out – Tom Scott
- 1977: Ghost Writer – Garland Jeffreys
- 1978: Pick 'Em – Ron Carter
- 1978: 52nd Street – Billy Joel
- 1978: Roberta Flack – Roberta Flack
- 1978: Boys in the Trees – Carly Simon
- 1978: City Lights – Dr. John (US; Horizon Records & Tapes; SP 732)
- 1978: Intimate Strangers – Tom Scott
- 1978: One-Eyed Jack – Garland Jeffreys
- 1979: Tango Palace – Dr. John (US; Horizon Records & Tapes; SP 740)
- 1979: Headin' Home – Gary Wright
- 1979: Fate for Breakfast – Art Garfunkel
- 1979: Street Beat – Tom Scott
- 1980: After Dark – Andy Gibb
- 1980: Double Fantasy – John Lennon and Yoko Ono
- 1980: Naughty – Chaka Khan
- 1980: Red Cab to Manhattan – Stephen Bishop
- 1980: One-Trick Pony – Paul Simon
- 1980: Gaucho – Steely Dan
- 1980: One Bad Habit – Michael Franks
- 1981: Apple Juice – Tom Scott
- 1981: There Must Be a Better World Somewhere – B.B. King
- 1981: Torch – Carly Simon
- 1981: Season of Glass – Yoko Ono
- 1981: 4 – Foreigner
- 1982: The Nightfly – Donald Fagen
- 1982: Another Grey Area – Graham Parker
- 1982: Hey Ricky – Melissa Manchester
- 1982: It's Alright (I See Rainbows) –Yoko Ono
- 1982: Objects of Desire – Michael Franks
- 1982: Anyone Can See – Irene Cara
- 1983: Guts for Love – Garland Jeffreys
- 1983: Emergency – Melissa Manchester
- 1983: Dirty Looks – Juice Newton
- 1983: Burlap & Satin – Dolly Parton
- 1983: Hello Big Man – Carly Simon
- 1984: Milk and Honey – John Lennon and Yoko Ono
- 1985: Skin Dive – Michael Franks
- 1987: Jill Jones – Jill Jones
- 1987: Coming Around Again – Carly Simon
- 1987: Inside Information – Foreigner
- 1988: Lefty – Art Garfunkel
- 1988: Hot Water – Jimmy Buffett
- 1989: Steady On – Shawn Colvin
- 1991: Don't Call Me Buckwheat – Garland Jeffreys
- 1997: A Story – Yoko Ono
- 1997: Alta suciedad – Andrés Calamaro
- 1997: Deuces Wild – B.B. King
- 2000: Two Against Nature - Steely Dan
- 2003: Everything Must Go – Steely Dan
- 2003: The Diary of Alicia Keys - Alicia Keys
- 2005: Restless Angel – Marie Gabrielle (co-producer)
- 2006: Morph the Cat – Donald Fagen
- 2007: Romancing the '60s – Frankie Valli
- 2011: Stronger – Kelly Clarkson
- 2012: The King of In Between – Garland Jeffreys
- 2014: Life Journey – Leon Russell
