= Adam Miller (singer) =

American singer-songwriter (1947–2025)

- Born: February 24, 1947
- Died: February 4, 2025 (aged 77)
- Genres: Folk rock
- Occupation: Singer-songwriter
- Instrument(s): Voice, guitar
- Labels: Chelsea Records

Adam Stewart Miller (February 24, 1947 – February 4, 2025) was an American singer-songwriter, mainly active in the 1970s.

== Early life and education ==
Miller grew up in Washington, D.C., in the Barnaby Woods neighborhood. He was a chorister at Washington Cathedral from the age of nine, singing as a treble soloist in the Cathedral Choir under Paul Callaway and Richard Dirksen.

He attended Hampden-Sydney College, spent two years at Columbia University and completed his degree at Georgetown University.

== Career ==
Miller started playing guitar and piano and began writing his own songs as a teenager. He collaborated with producer Wes Farrell, writing songs for David Cassidy's albums Cherish and Rock Me Baby (both 1972). His song "The West Wind Circus" was covered by Helen Reddy on her fourth album Long Hard Climb in 1973. He is lead vocalist on the song "The Soul of Patrick Lee" by John Cale, released on Cale's and Terry Riley's collaborative album Church of Anthrax in 1971. He is also singing background vocals on Desertshore by Nico and produced by John Cale. He also sang background vocals on Garland Jeffreys' 1973 eponymous debut album.

Miller released two solo albums on Chelsea Records (distributed by RCA Records), featuring songs he wrote for Cassidy, and also new songs. His first album Who Would Give His Only Song Away was released in 1972. It was produced by Wes Farrell and features, among others, Larry Carlton on guitar, Mike Melvoin on piano, Jim Horn on saxophone and Hal Blaine on drums. It was described as "Piercing lyrics and Miller's twangy, folksy vocals are pleasant but it is the album's fine, far-ranging instrumental background that sets the production above ordinary folk and into a sort of pop-folk category." Another reviewer stated that "there's mystery, enigma in his lyrics and music. And yet it's so clear, so smooth. He lets you so deep into his head, you have to listen and let the music mean what it means – to you."

Miller's second album Westwind Circus, produced by Terry Cashman and Tommy West, was released two years later and features Michael Kamen on synthesizer, and Steve Gadd and Rick Marotta on drums, among other musicians. After the release of this album, he disappeared from public life.

== Later life and death ==
Miller experienced "a spiritual epiphany of sorts" and returned to school later in life in the late 1980s to become credentialed as a counselor. He worked as program manager at ESI International doing corporate training and simultaneously also worked as an Assistant Residential Counselor at Fairfax County Virginia Department of Mental Health. He was married and divorced in the 1980s and had one daughter.

Miller died on February 4, 2025, at the age of 77. His long-time life partner at the time of his death was Cindy Johns.

== Discography ==
Albums

- Who Would Give His Only Song Away (1972)
- Westwind Circus (1974)

Singles

- "Man of My Word" / "Hope I Win" (1972)
- "The Last Word" / "Blind Hope" (1974)
