= Ghost Writer (album) =

Studio album by Garland Jeffreys
- Released: 1977
- Recorded: 1977
- Studio: Atlantic Studios, New York City
- Label: A&M
- Producer: Roy Cicala, David Spinozza, Garland Jeffreys

Garland Jeffreys chronology
Garland Jeffreys (1973)	Ghost Writer (1977)	One-Eyed Jack (1978)

Professional ratings
Review scores
Source	Rating
AllMusic	4.5/5 stars
Christgau's Record Guide	A−
The Encyclopedia of Popular Music	3/5 stars
The Rolling Stone Album Guide	4/5 stars

Ghost Writer is the second solo album by Garland Jeffreys, released by A&M Records in 1977. It was recorded with an all-star lineup of session musicians, including Dr. John, The Brecker Brothers, Anthony Jackson, Steve Gadd, Hugh McCracken, David Spinozza, and Leon Pendarvis. Alongside the tracks specially recorded for the album, it includes Jeffreys' earlier song "Wild in the Streets", recorded with Dr. John and his band and released as a single by Atlantic Records in 1973.

The album peaked at No. 140 on the Billboard 200.

== Critical reception ==
AllMusic wrote that the album "covers a lot of ground in ten songs, but it never gets lost on its whirlwind ride around the city, and if it became a cult item rather than a mainstream success, anyone who gives this a fair hearing is likely to conclude it's the work of an artist of the first order." The Boston Globe called it "a classic of the era, with hints of doo-wop, easy skanking, and even a little disco, all scuffed up with bankruptcy-era New York City grit."

The album led Rolling Stone to name Jeffreys the "Best New Artist" of 1977.

== Track listing ==
All tracks composed by Garland Jeffreys

1. "Rough and Ready" - 2:57
2. "I May Not Be Your Kind" - 3:46
3. "New York Skyline" - 3:29
4. "Cool Down Boy" - 4:04
5. "Ghost Writer" - 5:39
6. "Lift Me Up" - 3:28
7. "Why-O" - 3:38
8. "Wild in the Streets" - 2:59
9. "35 Millimeter Dreams" - 3:12
10. "Spanish Town" - 7:43

== Personnel ==
- Garland Jeffreys - guitar, percussion, vocals
- Anthony Jackson - bass
- John Boudreaux, Rick Marotta, Steve Gadd - drums
- Alan Freedman, Sugarbear - guitar
- Hugh McCracken - guitar, harmonica
- David Spinozza - guitar, keyboards
- Don Grolnick, Dr. John, Leon Pendarvis - keyboards
- Rubens Bassini - percussion
- Al Cohn, David Sanborn, Michael Brecker - saxophone
- Phil Messina - trombone
- Burt Collins, Danny Cahn, Randy Brecker - trumpet
- Arnold McCuller, David Lasley, David Peel, James Taylor, Lynn Pitney - backing vocals

Technical

- Randy Mason - assistant engineer
- Lew Hahn - recording, mixing
- Carole Langer - cover concept, art direction
- Duane Michals - cover photography
