= Max Murphy =

Max Murphy may refer to:

- Max Murphy, founder of Presentation College, Chaguanas
- Max Murphy (bassist) in Mutant Press
