= Paul Griffin (musician) =

American session musician and pianist (1937–2000)

Paul Griffin (August 6, 1937 – June 14, 2000) was an American pianist and session musician who recorded with hundreds of musicians from the 1950s to the 1990s.

== Career ==
Born in Harlem, New York, he began as the touring pianist in the backing band for King Curtis and eventually worked with Bob Dylan, Steely Dan, Don McLean, the Isley Brothers, Van Morrison, the Shirelles, and Dionne Warwick. He may be best known for his colourful and distinctive playing on the Bob Dylan albums Highway 61 Revisited and Blonde on Blonde, and on Steely Dan's song "Peg". He is extensively featured playing a virtuoso performance of gospel piano on Don McLean's single, "American Pie", and Paul Simon's "Tenderness". He is credited as co-author of the song "The Fez" on Steely Dan's The Royal Scam, one of only two Steely Dan non-cover songs with a credited writer other than Steely Dan founders Walter Becker and Donald Fagen.

He was an arranger for The Warriors (1979) and Four Friends (1981) and performed in On Location: Robert Klein at Yale (1982) and on the soundtrack for Blue Sunshine (1976).

He died of a heart attack at his home in New York at the age of 62, suffering from complications of diabetes. He was awaiting a liver transplant at the time of his death.

== Recordings ==
With Bob Dylan

- Bringing It All Back Home (Columbia Records, 1965)
- Highway 61 Revisited (Columbia Records, 1965)
- Blonde on Blonde (Columbia Records, 1966)
- Blood on the Tracks (Columbia Records, 1975)

With Dion DiMucci

- You're Not Alone (Warner Bros. Records, 1971)

With George Benson

- Goodies (Verve, 1968)

With Tom Rush

- Tom Rush (Columbia Records, 1970)

With Wilson Pickett

- In the Midnight Hour (Atlantic Records, 1965)
- It's Harder Now (Rounder Records, 1999)

With Michael Franks

- Tiger in the Rain (Warner Bros. Records, 1979)

With John Denver

- Rhymes & Reasons (RCA Records, 1969)
- Take Me to Tomorrow (RCA Records, 1970)
- Whose Garden Was This (RCA Records, 1970)
- Aerie (RCA Records, 1971)

With Peter, Paul and Mary

- Album 1700 (Warner Bros. Records, 1967)

With Al Kooper

- You Never Know Who Your Friends Are (Columbia Records, 1969)

With David Clayton-Thomas

- David Clayton-Thomas (Columbia Records, 1972)

With Gloria Loring

- ...And Now We Come to Distances (Evolution Records, 1970)
- Friends & Lovers (Atlantic Records, 1986)

With Melba Moore

- Peach Melba (Buddah Records, 1975)

With LaVern Baker

- See See Rider (Atlantic Records, 1963)

With Janis Siegel

- Experiment in White (Atlantic Records, 1982)

With Solomon Burke

- If You Need Me (Atlantic Records, 1963)
- King Solomon (Atlantic Records, 1968)
- I Wish I Knew (Atlantic Records, 1968)

With Jackie Lomax

- Home Is In My Head (Warner Bros. Records, 1971)

With Steely Dan

- The Royal Scam (ABC Records, 1976)
- Aja (ABC Records, 1977)

With Marlena Shaw

- Marlena (Blue Note Records, 1972)

With Roberta Flack and Donny Hathaway

- Roberta Flack Featuring Donny Hathaway (Atlantic Records, 1980)

With John Lennon and Yoko Ono

- Milk and Honey (Polydor Records, 1984)

With Don McLean

- American Pie (EMI, 1971)

With Carly Simon

- Carly Simon (Elektra Records, 1971)

With Roberta Flack

- Blue Lights in the Basement (Atlantic Records, 1977)
- I'm the One (Atlantic Records, 1982)

With Judy Collins

- Judith (Elektra Records, 1975)

With Cheryl Lynn

- In Love (Columbia Records, 1979)

With Gloria Gaynor

- Gloria Gaynor (Atlantic Records, 1982)

With Stephanie Mills

- Movin' in the Right Direction (ABC Records, 1974)

With Donald Fagen

- Kamakiriad (Reprise Records, 1993)

With Yoko Ono

- It's Alright (I See Rainbows) (Polygram Records, 1982)

With Van Morrison

- Blowin' Your Mind! (Bang Records, 1967)

With Paul Simon

- There Goes Rhymin' Simon (Columbia Records, 1973)
- Songs from The Capeman (Warner Bros. Records, 1997)

With Garland Jeffreys

- Garland Jeffreys (Atlantic Records, 1973)
- Guts for Love (Epic Records, 1982)
- Don't Call Me Buckwheat (BMG, 1991)

With Aretha Franklin

- Unforgettable: A Tribute to Dinah Washington (Columbia Records, 1964)
- La Diva (Arista Records, 1979)

With Bonnie Raitt

- Streetlights (Warner Bros. Records, 1974)

With Laura Nyro

- Eli and the Thirteenth Confession (Columbia Records, 1968)

With The Free Design

- Kites Are Fun (Project 3 Records, 1967)
- You Could Be Born Again (Project 3 Records, 1968)
