= Rock 'n' Roll Adult =

Live album by Garland Jeffreys
- Released: 1981
- Recorded: 22 March, 30 April, 1–2 May 1981
- Genre: Rock, Reggae
- Label: Epic
- Producer: Bob Clearmountain, Garland Jeffreys, Dick Wingate

Garland Jeffreys chronology
Escape Artist (1981)	Rock 'n' Roll Adult (1981)	Guts for Love (1983)

Rock 'n' Roll Adult is a live album by Garland Jeffreys. It was recorded live in Lyon France and at The Ritz in New York City. It was released in 1981 by Epic Records.

== Track listing ==
All tracks composed by Garland Jeffreys; except where indicated

1. "Wild in the Streets" - 3:20
2. "96 Tears" (Rudy Martinez) - 3:21
3. "I May Not Be Your Kind" - 5:56
4. "Matador" - 4:22
5. "R.O.C.K." - 3:59
6. "35 Millimeter Dreams" - 4:07
7. "Bound to Get Ahead Someday" - 3:58
8. "Cool Down Boy" - 12:45

== Personnel ==
- Garland Jeffreys - vocals, guitar, percussion, cover concept
- Martin Belmont -guitar, backing vocals
- Andrew Bodnar - bass
- Arti Funaro - keyboards, guitar, backing vocals
- Steve Goulding - drums
- Brinsley Schwarz - guitar, backing vocals
- Brian Stanley - bass

Technical

- Barry Ainsworth, Barry Bongiovi, David Brown, David Hewitt, Kooster McAllister, Michael Ewasko - engineer
