= Cherish (David Cassidy album) =

Studio album by David Cassidy
- Released: February 1972
- Recorded: 1971
- Studios: Western Recorders Studio 2, Hollywood, California
- Genre: Pop
- Length: 34:21
- Label: Bell
- Producer: Wes Farrell

David Cassidy chronology
| Cherish (1972) | Rock Me Baby (1972) |

Professional ratings
Review scores
| Source | Rating |
|---|---|
| AllMusic | 4/5 stars |

Cherish is the debut solo album by American singer David Cassidy, produced by Wes Farrell and released by Bell Records in early 1972.

== Recording ==
Cassidy had come to prominence via the TV series The Partridge Family and had sung lead on several hit singles and successful albums under the group moniker. Being underage at 19 upon being signed to The Partridge Family and during the first season of the show, Cassidy was on a flat-rate contract with Columbia Pictures and earned no royalties from recordings issued under the Partridge Family name on the Columbia-owned Bell label. However, upon reaching the age of 21 during the hiatus before Season 2 began production in April 1971, Cassidy was able to renegotiate his contract to include payment of royalties for sales of recordings and merchandise, as well as gaining a degree of input into, and control over, his recording career.

Cherish was designed as a project by Partridge Family musical producer Wes Farrell to break Cassidy out as a solo star via material not directly connected to the TV series. The album was recorded during the second half of 1971 with essentially the same musicians and technicians who had worked on earlier Partridge Family recordings, but with the aim of giving Cassidy a more mature sound than he had been able to display via the Partridge Family, and more personal material with which to work. Regular Farrell associates Tony Romeo and Adam Miller contributed three tracks each, while Kin Vassy – at the time a member of The First Edition featuring Kenny Rogers – penned the dramatic ballad "My First Night Alone Without You", a track which was subsequently covered by a number of other artists including Dionne Warwick and Bonnie Raitt. The album also includes the Cassidy-penned track "Ricky's Tune", reportedly a homage to a recently deceased pet dog.

== Release ==
Cassidy's first solo single, released in October 1971 while recording of the album was still in progress, was the title track, a cover of The Association's 1966 Billboard chart topper, said to have been chosen as the lead single by Farrell after a search for a song which would be instantly familiar to audiences, but had not yet been the subject of any widely known cover version. The single peaked at No.9 in December 1971 (No.1 Adult Contemporary), and was followed by the U.S. release of the album in early February 1972, along with a second single "Could It Be Forever". The single stalled at No.37, but the album was generally favorably received and sold well, reaching No.15 on the Billboard 200.

In the United Kingdom, where the Partridge Family was just beginning to catch on (the TV series did not start to air there until December 1971), Cherish was released in March 1972. It was decided to release "Could It Be Forever" and "Cherish" as a Double A-side, which quickly rose to No.2, with "Could It Be Forever" receiving the majority of airplay on radio stations. The album also took off. It climbed to No.2 and remained in the Top 40 for 43 weeks. This marked the start of a 3-year period in which Cassidy became one of the biggest record-sellers and a pre-eminent teen idol in the U.K. and Australia (where "Cherish" hit No.1) at the same time as his sales in the U.S. were falling. In March 1973 (following two successful singles from Cassidy's second album Rock Me Baby) the UK fan-favorite "I Am a Clown" with its memorable spoken introduction was belatedly issued as a single, and reached No.3.

Cherish was deleted from catalogs in the late 1970s, and for many years remained available only via second-hand markets. The album was finally remastered and issued on CD through Arista in 2000, and remains in print. The reputation of Cherish is largely positive, with Allmusic's Lindsay Planer describing the album as " Overall...an admirable first time out and, above all, [it] continues to display the vocalist's theatrical sensibilities and performance style.".

== Track listing ==
1. "Being Together" (Tony Romeo) – 2:53
2. "I Just Wanna Make You Happy" (Wes Farrell, Bobby Hart) – 2:18
3. "Could It Be Forever" (Wes Farrell, Danny Janssen) – 2:16
4. "Blind Hope" (Adam Miller) – 3:14
5. "I Lost My Chance" (Adam Miller) – 2:38
6. "My First Night Alone Without You" (Kin Vassy) – 3:34
7. "We Could Never Be Friends ('Cause We've Been Lovers Too Long)" (Tony Romeo) – 2:50
8. "Where Is the Morning" (Adam Miller) – 2:53
9. "I Am a Clown" (Tony Romeo) – 4:35
10. "Cherish" (Terry Kirkman) – 3:46
11. "Ricky's Tune" (David Cassidy) – 3:24

== Personnel ==
- David Cassidy – Vocals
- Hal Blaine – Drums
- Mike Melvoin – Piano, strings & horn arrangements
- Max Bennett, Reinie Press – Bass guitar
- Louis Shelton, Tommy Tedesco, Larry Carlton, Dennis Budimir – Guitar
- The Love Generation – Backing vocals (arranged by John Bahler)
