= Grinder's Switch Featuring Garland Jeffreys =

Grinder's Switch featuring Garland Jeffreys

Studio album by Grinder's Switch featuring Garland Jeffreys
- Released: 1970
- Studio: Mastertone Studios, New York City, NY
- Genre: Rock
- Label: Vanguard
- Producer: Lewis Merenstein

Garland Jeffreys chronology
Grinder's Switch featuring Garland Jeffreys (1970)	Garland Jeffreys (1973)

Professional ratings
Review scores
Source	Rating
Christgau's Record Guide	B

Grinder's Switch featuring Garland Jeffreys is the debut album of Garland Jeffreys and Grinder's Switch. It was released by Vanguard Records (catalog number VSD 6550) in 1970. The 1970 version issued in France (catalog number VSD 23050) used the name Grinder's Switch. The CD releases use the name Garland Jeffreys and Grinder's Switch. It was produced by Lewis Merenstein.

== Track listing ==
All tracks composed by Garland Jeffreys

1. "Sister Divine" - 4:45
2. "Father, the Son, and the Holy Ghost" - 3:56
3. "Won't Ya Come Back Home" - 2:26
4. "Dear Jolly Jack" - 3:41
5. "And Don't Be Late" - 2:42
6. "An Imaginary Invalid" - 4:05
7. "Last Night I Drove Down to the Bar (Women and Wine)" - 2:09
8. "Evening" - 1:52
9. "They Call Me Fortune and Fame" - 2:17
10. "Seven Sleepers' Den" - 7:40

== Personnel ==
Grinder's Switch featuring Garland Jeffreys

- Garland Jeffreys - lead vocals, acoustic guitar
- Ernie Corallo - vocals, acoustic guitar, electric guitar, steel guitar, mandolin
- Richard Davis - bass
- Sanford Konikoff - drums
- Bob Piazza - bass
- Stan Szelest - vocals, harmonica, organ, piano

Technical

- Neil Schwartz - engineer
- Jules Halfant - art direction
- Joel Brodsky - cover photography
