= The King of In Between =

Studio album by Garland Jeffreys
- Released: 2011
- Genre: Rock, Reggae
- Label: Big Lake Records
- Producer: Larry Campbell, Garland Jeffreys

Garland Jeffreys chronology
Wildlife Dictionary (1997)	The King of In Between (2011)	Truth Serum (2013)

The King of In Between is a solo album by Garland Jeffreys. It was released in 2011 by Big Lake Records and self-produced. Lou Reed provided backing vocals on one track on the album, "The Contortionist".

== Critical reception ==
The King of In Between has a score of 79/100 on Metacritic, indicating "generally favorable reviews".

Professional ratings
Aggregate scores
Source	Rating
Metacritic	(79%)
Review scores
Source	Rating
AllMusic	4/5 stars
The Austin Chronicle	3.5/5 stars
Robert Christgau	A-

== Track listing ==
All tracks composed by Garland Jeffreys

1. "Coney Island Winter" - 3:50
2. "I'm Alive" - 4:01
3. "Streetwise" - 4:48
4. "The Contortionist" - 3:53
5. "All Around the World" - 4:38
6. "'Til John Lee Hooker Calls Me" - 4:02
7. "Love Is Not a Cliché" - 3:27
8. "Rock and Roll Music" - 2:56
9. "The Beautiful Truth" - 4:04
10. "Roller Coast Town" - 3:06
11. "In God's Waiting Room" - 3:59
12. "Rock On" (unlisted bonus track) - 3:18

== Personnel ==
- Garland Jeffreys - vocals, acoustic guitar (tracks: 1, 2, 5, 11, 12, 13)
- Larry Campbell - electric guitar (tracks: 3, 4, 6); acoustic and electric guitar, mandolin, violin, string arrangements (tracks: 12, 13); guitar solos (tracks: 4, 8); rhythm guitar (track: 9); revelator guitar (track: 11)
- Duncan Sheik - acoustic and electric guitar, sonic orchestration (track: 2)
- Duke Levine - electric guitar (tracks: 3, 4, 6, 8, 12, 13); wah-wah electric guitar, special effects (track: 9)
- Hugh McCracken (tracks: 2), Junior Marvin (tracks: 5, 10) - electric guitar
- Mark Bosch - acoustic, electric and slide guitar (tracks: 2, 7); electric guitar, organ, piano (tracks: 1, 7)
- Alan Freedman - acoustic guitar (track: 12); electric guitar (tracks: 2, 5, 7, 10)
- Jeremy Chatzky (tracks: 5, 10), John Conte (tracks: 1, 7), Mike Merritt (tracks: 3, 4, 6, 8, 9,12,13), Pino Palladino (track: 2) - bass
- Brian Mitchell - keyboards (tracks: 12, 13); Hammond organ (tracks: 3, 4, 9), piano (tracks: 4, 8)
- George Kouao - keyboards (tracks: 5, 10)
- Rich Pagano (tracks: 1, 7), Steve Goulding (tracks: 5, 10), Steve Jordan (tracks: 2 to 4, 6, 8, 9, 12, 13) - drums
- Jerry Johnson - tenor saxophone (tracks: 5, 10)
- Clark Gayton - trombone (tracks: 5, 10)
- Savannah Jeffreys, Vaneese Thomas - additional vocals (track: 4)
- Cindy Mizelle (tracks: 5, 13), Lou Reed (track: 4), Vaneese Thomas (track: 8) - backing vocals
