= One-Eyed Jack (album) =

Studio album by Garland Jeffreys
- Released: 1978
- Studio: Atlantic, New York City
- Genre: Rock
- Label: A&M
- Producer: David Spinozza, Garland Jeffreys

Garland Jeffreys chronology
Ghost Writer (1977)	One-Eyed Jack (1978)	American Boy & Girl (1979)

One-Eyed Jack is an album by Garland Jeffreys, released in 1978 on A&M Records. It was recorded at Atlantic Studios, in New York City, and produced by Jeffreys and David Spinozza. It was dedicated: "in Memory of my childhood idol, Jackie Robinson ... here comes the One-Eyed Jack, Sometimes white and sometimes black".

The album peaked at No. 99 on the Billboard 200.

== Critical reception ==
Professional ratings
Review scores
Source	Rating
AllMusic	3.5/5 stars
Christgau's Record Guide	C+
The Encyclopedia of Popular Music	3/5 stars
The Rolling Stone Album Guide	3/5 stars

The Globe and Mail wrote that "the promise shown in one earlier album has either disappeared entirely or has been smothered under a battery of badly-produced backup musicians." The Rolling Stone Album Guide called One-Eyed Jack "a somewhat confused, less-than-catchy concept album."

== Track listing ==
All tracks composed by Garland Jeffreys; except where indicated

1. "She Didn't Lie" - 3:25
2. "Keep On Trying" - 3:14
3. "Reelin'" - 3:14
4. "Haunted House" - 2:53
5. "One-Eyed Jack" - 5:01
6. "Scream in the Night" - 3:50
7. "No Woman No Cry" (Vincent Ford, Bob Marley) - 4:42
8. "Oh My Soul" - 4:03
9. "Desperation Drive" - 4:21
10. "Been There and Back" - 4:24

== Charts ==
Chart (1978)	Peak position
Australian (Kent Music Report)	82

== Personnel ==
- Garland Jeffreys - guitar, percussion, vocals
- Hugh McCracken - guitar, slide guitar, harmonica
- David Spinozza - guitar, slide guitar, piano
- Andy Cherna, Jeff Mironov - guitar
- Anthony Jackson - bass
- Don Grolnick - piano, organ
- Dr. John - piano, clavinet
- Rob Mounsey - organ
- Rick Trifan - mini Moog, synthetic strings
- Winston Grennan, Rick Shlosser - drums
- Steve Gadd - drums, timbales, percussion
- Ralph MacDonald - congas, percussion
- Michael Brecker, George Young - tenor saxophone
- David Sanborn - alto and baritone saxophone
- Lou Delgato - baritone saxophone
- Randy Brecker, Alan Rubin, Marvin Stamm - trumpet
- David Lasley, Diana Graselli, Diva Gray, Phoebe Snow, Luther Vandross - backing vocals

Technical

- "Iron Mike" Michael O'Reilly - assistant engineer
- Lew Hahn - recording, mixing
- Carole Langer - creative director
- Chuck Beeson - design
- Bob Richardson - cover photography
