= Jerome T. Youngman =

American musician (1951–2024)

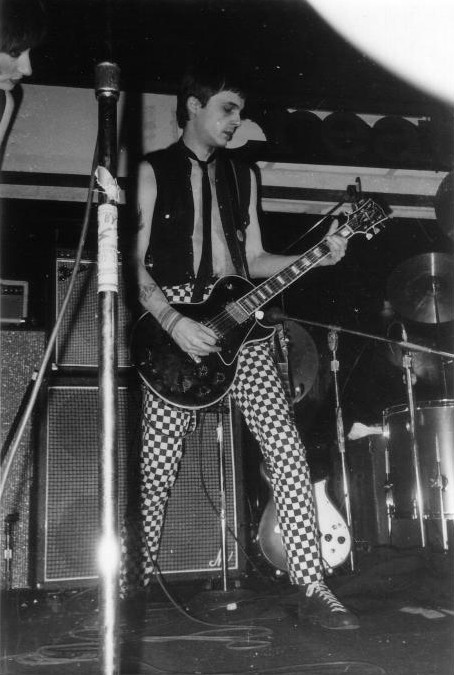
- Youngman with Hooks in 1981

Background information
- Also known as: Super Jerome, Mr Yummy, Reverend Jerome T. Youngman
- Born: Thomas Cass Youngman; September 15, 1951; Detroit, Michigan, United States
- Died: December 21, 2024 (aged 73) Austin, Texas, United States
- Genres: Punk rock; Hard rock; Garage rock
- Occupations: Guitar player; Composer; Songwriter; Record producer
- Instruments: Electric guitar; Piano; Drums; Synthesizers
- Years active: 1963–2020
- Labels: Capitol, Elysian, 500 Pound Weasel, Fleabus, Bomp! Records, Record Plant
- Formerly of: Hooks, Mutant Press
- Website: mutantpress.com

Jerome T. Youngman, born Thomas Cass Youngman, (September 15, 1951 – December 21, 2024), was an American rock musician, singer, songwriter, and record producer, best known for his hits, "Creeps at my Door" and "Blood for Oil", and TV host of the Talk show Bring it to Jerome. Youngman's musical influences were Igor Stravinsky, John Lee Hooker, Rolling Stones, Bo Diddley, The Fugs, Philip Glass, The Velvet Underground, and Brian Eno.

== Career ==
Youngman attended schools in both Detroit and Kalamazoo before entering Wayne State University in Detroit, where he achieved a Bachelor's degree in Psychology. As a licensed social worker, he worked with runaway teenagers, abused children, mentally ill people, gangs, drug addicts, and homeless families. In Hollywood, California, he worked for the Travelers Aid Society, at the Teen Canteen drop-in center as a counselor and outreach worker with runaway homeless teenagers. In Detroit, he worked for the Family First Program. His job was to walk the streets and visit homeless shelters to counsel and recruit homeless families to the Target Home program. Youngman also worked for several Assertive Community Treatment (ACT) programs that provided supportive services to the mentally ill community. He joined the Los Angeles Unified School District (LAUSD) as a long-term elementary school substitute teacher in East LA and Watts for 10 years. In 1992, after completing the TCI TV production class in Royal Oak, Michigan, Youngman and wife, Rocio, created the cable TV show Bring it to Jerome. The program ran on various networks nationally from 1992 to 2004 when Youngman returned to Los Angeles. Reviews referred to the show as "a counterculture music/art talk show, "Romper Room on drugs." The Metro Times wrote, "The local band Mutant Press now has their own TV program. YIKES!!!!!!". Metro Times voters also voted Bring it to Jerome as "the best new cable TV show" in their "Best of Detroit" issue in 1995.

== Bands ==
=== Super Jerome's Magic Band ===
In 1965, Youngman's family moved to Kalamazoo, Michigan, where he attended Loy Norrix High School. In 1967, at the early age of 16 years, he started a band with school mates called Super Jerome's Magic Band. This eclectic punk blues band consisted of two saxophones, a trumpet, guitar, harp, bass guitar, and drums. Super Jerome's Magic Band performed and rehearsed at Kalamazoo College Blackspot and performed many times at the Crazy Horse club in Kalamazoo. At their appearance on May 5, 1968, "they completely destroyed two guitars, a television set, and a washing machine as m-80 fireworks exploded and the drum section from the Loy Norrix marching band marched back and forth across the stage dodging the bits of glass and other flying debris. Youngman explained that the band was more out for the personal satisfaction of assaulting the culture rather than making money."

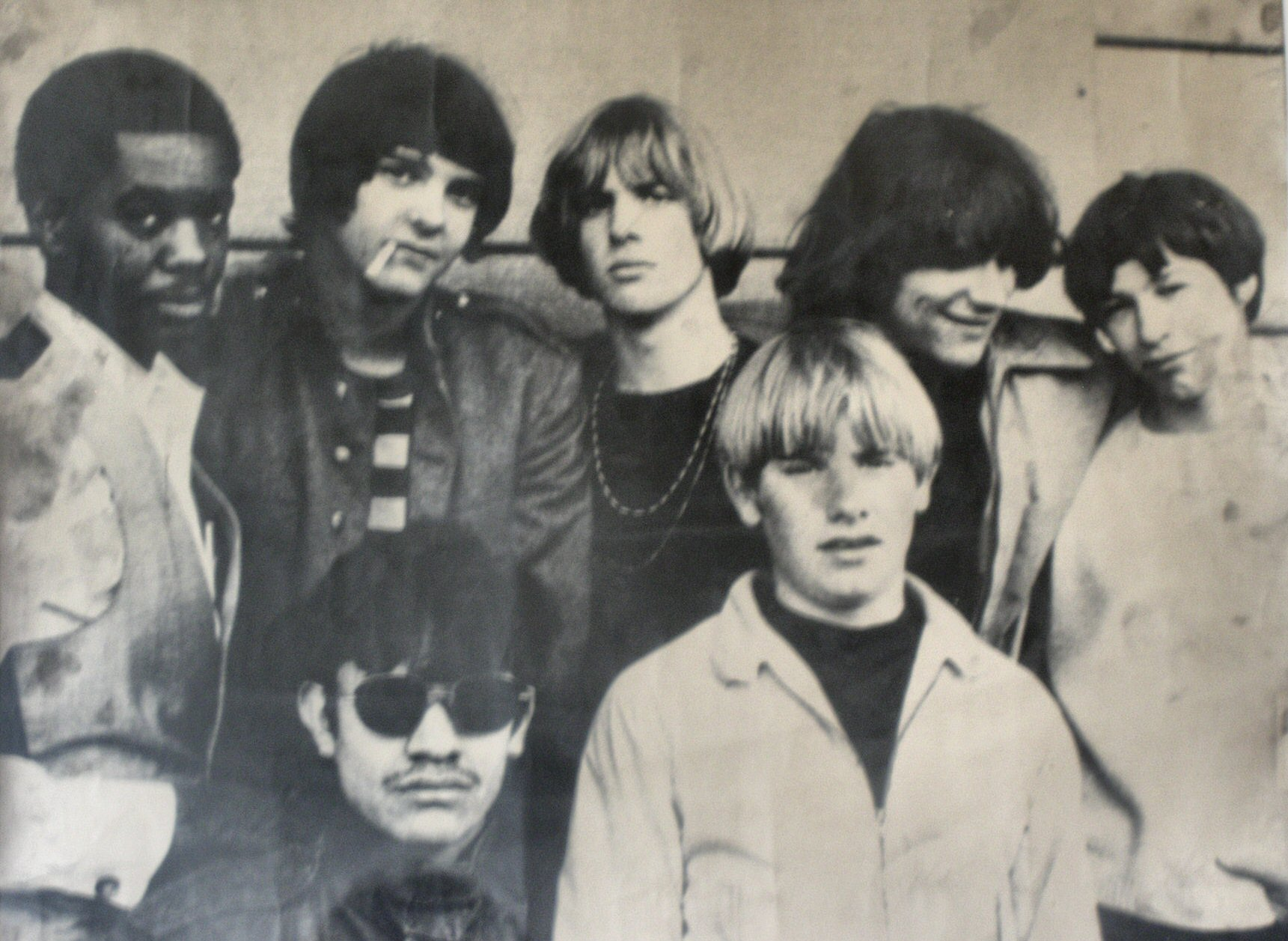
Super Jerome's Magic Band, Kalamazoo MI 1968

=== Motor City Mutants ===
After a near-fatal car accident in September 1969, Youngman retreated to Amsterdam to recuperate and conceptualize his next musical project. What emerged in the summer of 1970 was the Motor City Mutants, a high-energy, urban, punk blues band. The band debuted in January 1971 at Ann Arbor Union Ballroom. This performance featured the dissection of several dead animals the band found along I-94 on the way to the performance. Motor City Mutants original band members were Mutant Bob Tremain on electric piano, Julius Rodgers on drums, James Graves on vocals, Don Klos on bass guitar, Tom Morwatts and Youngman on guitars. The Motor City Mutants performed at many Michigan venues, including the Grande Ballroom and quickly gained a hardcore following. The band lasted for over ten years. In January 1974, Youngman left the band and moved to Hollywood, California.

=== Punk & The Flys ===
Punk was Youngman's first Hollywood band in 1974. Punk was managed by Roy MacMillan from Dynamic Recording in West Covina, California, where the band shared rehearsal space with Van Halen and pre Wall of Voodoo band Sky People. Band members were Youngman on guitar, Steve (Liberty) Loria on bass, and Lee Jenkins on drums. In October 1974, Punk performed at Rodney Bingenheimer's English Disco on the Sunset Strip. Punk broke up a year later after Youngman's suicide attempt that injured his left hand.

His suicide attempt caused permanent neural damage to his left hand, and he was unable to play guitar for over a year. During his recovery, his best friend and drummer, Phil Cohen, suggested they form a new band with Youngman playing keyboards. Youngman and Cohen created several new songs, including "Photo Dating Queen" and The Flys were born. Youngman gradually began playing guitar again but could only play two string bar chords due to his inability to feel his left hand. In 1976, The Flys opened for The Ramones at Svens Smoke House in Redondo Beach, California. The Ramones inspired Youngman, and his confidence soon returned. A leaner, more minimal guitar style began to emerge.

=== Ripper ===
His next Hollywood project was called Ripper. Ripper played most of the Hollywood clubs, including the Troubadour, the Starwood, and the Masque. The band soon disintegrated because of major personality problems and the lack of quality vocals. Ripper recorded three songs at Ratz studio. Youngman's "Creeps at my Door", "Trapped like a Rat", and "Unter der Faust", a German version of The Rolling Stones "Under my Thumb". This German version puts a fascist twist to the original sexist version, since "Unter der Faust" means under my fist. The original Ripper recording of "Unter der Faust" featured Youngman's piano playing, lead guitar, and heavy-duty style rhythm guitar, and the recording was also to feature "Creeps at my Door". After moving to New York City, with drummer Quito Ecuador to form Hooks, Youngman's rhythm guitar tracks were deleted. This deletion turned the heavy punk version into a light new wave pop recording. The songs were released on Bomp! Records and "Creeps at my Door" was omitted from this record.

=== Hooks ===
Hooks was a five-piece band that was dedicated to the simplicity that is the heart of rock and roll. Hooks began its musical odyssey in Hollywood in December 1978, when singer Sharon 7 teamed up with Youngman and drummer Quito Ecuador to record a demo of the Exciters' 1960s hit, "Tell Him". The results were a tremendous update that featured the embryo of the sound that was to become the trademark of Hooks. Seeing that there was chemistry between the players, Sharon 7 suggested that Youngman and Quito move to New York. Keyboardist J. Elliot joined them, and after months of searching for a bass guitarist, Hooks found Lew Mazzeo.

Hooks single "Lipstick on Your Collar" and "Young and Boring" were produced by Roy Cicala and Sam Ginsberg of the Record Plant. Hooks were regulars on the N.Y.C. club scene, playing clubs like CBGB's, Max's Kansas City and the Ritz. Hooks appeared live with Duran Duran, the Ramones, Iggy Pop, Adam & the Ants, Heartbreakers, David Johansen, King Crimson, The Beat, Sylvain Sylvain, Klaus Nomi, and others. Hooks was featured on an NBC Nightly News segment in 1982 that explored the phenomenon of the Music Building on 8th Avenue', in the heart of NYC Garment District. Madonna lived in the Music Building with her girlfriend, Camille, from 1980 to 1982. In 1982, she recruited Youngman, Quito, and Lou to create two original songs for her and back her up for a live performance on the Uncle Floyd Show. Youngman left Hooks in 1983 after disagreements with the record producers and returned to Detroit to complete his academic studies. In April 1983, he obtained a B.A. in Psychology from Wayne State University. A week after graduation, Youngman quickly returned to Hollywood and formed Too Many Gods.

=== Too Many Gods ===
In 1983, Youngman moved back to Los Angeles. In 1985, he released his first solo effort, a gold 45 record I Need More as Reverend Jerome T. Youngman. He then created a band of machines called Too Many Gods, the first one-person techno punk blues band. For the first time, with the invention of MIDI in 1983, a one-person pre-programmed live performance band became possible. With the assistance of Shelly, a dancer, Too Many Gods became regulars at the Limbo Lounge in the West Hollywood underground punk disco drag queen scene. Too Many Gods evolved into Mutant Press.

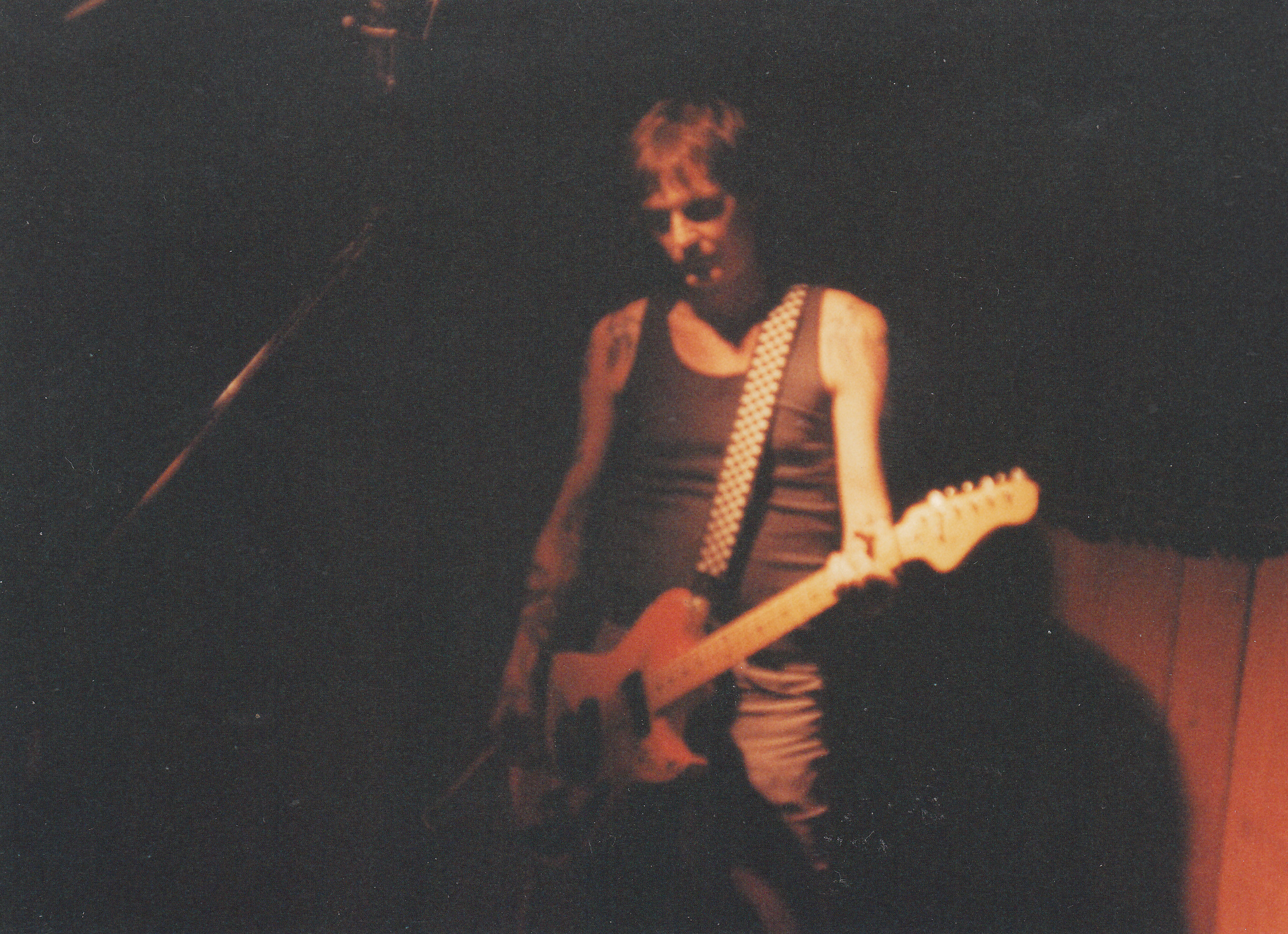
Youngman in Los Angeles recording studio, 1990.

=== Mutant Press ===
In 1990, Youngman started Mutant Press, a political hard rock techno/punk blues band in Hollywood, California. Mutant Press's first job was headlining an international act at the LUC club in Mexico City in 1990.

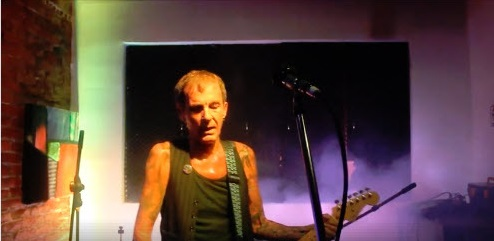
Mutant Press Mexico City, 2018

In 1992, the Mutant Press project moved to Michigan. He obtained a social worker license and worked for many Detroit social service agencies with homeless and mentally ill populations. From 1996 to 2004, he managed 500 Pound Weasel Records, his recording studio in Southfield, Michigan. He released fourteen Mutant Press albums and produced over 200 CDs for local rap, hip hop, and punk rock artists.

Frank Moore & Mikee Labash (Love Underground Visionary Revolution) from San Francisco joined the creative team after the 2004 Mother's Day performance at Kimos. The same year, artist Mikee Labash created the art for the album Evil. In 2004, after the death of his parents, Youngman and his wife Rocio returned to Long Beach, California, and produced the Mutant Press album Idiots Rule with Steve Loria (Spirit) on bass guitar and Phil Cohen (The Heaters) on drums. Josie Cotton performed a cover of the Mutant Press song "Creeps at my Door" on her 2006 release entitled Movie Disaster Music.

Mutant Press received outstanding reviews. In 2003, Blood for Oil appeared in Robert Christgau's Choice Cuts in The Village Voice. Amy Goodman opened her show Democracy Now! with this song. Blood for Oil was first recorded for the 2003 album of the same name that was a Mutant Press tribute to the Fugs.

In 2007, Robert Christgau wrote about Mutant Press "if the MC5 hadn't kicked the bucket, they'd be older and greyer than these guys, but not louder or more revolutionary."

In January 2008, Youngman relocated to Austin, Texas. His band, Mutant Press, performed at the 2008 South by Southwest Festival (SXSW) and became a regular presence on the 6th Street music scene. During this time, he also produced several well-received albums, including Don't Mess with Mutant Press.

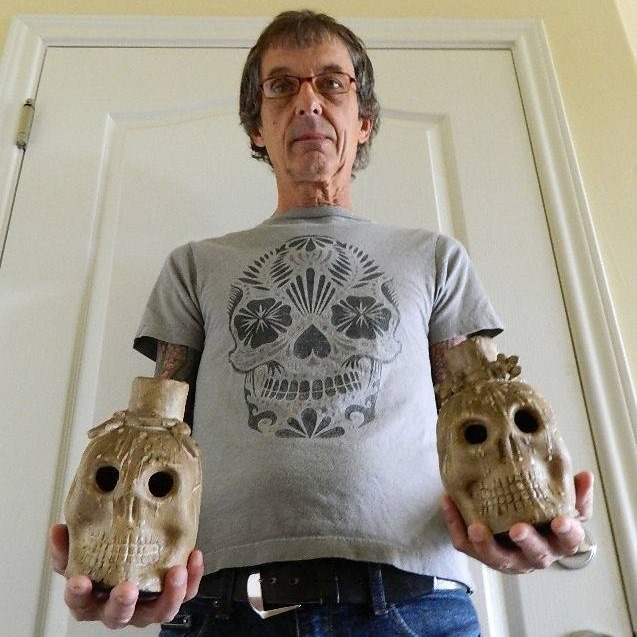
Jerome, Dia de los Muertos, Mexico City, 2022

Youngman frequently worked in a home recording studio in Mexico City. In August 2018, he performed two sets at the inaugural Motor City Muscle (MCM) Festival in downtown Detroit. That same year, Mutant Press gave a well-received performance at Capitan Gallo in Mexico City.

== Illness and death ==
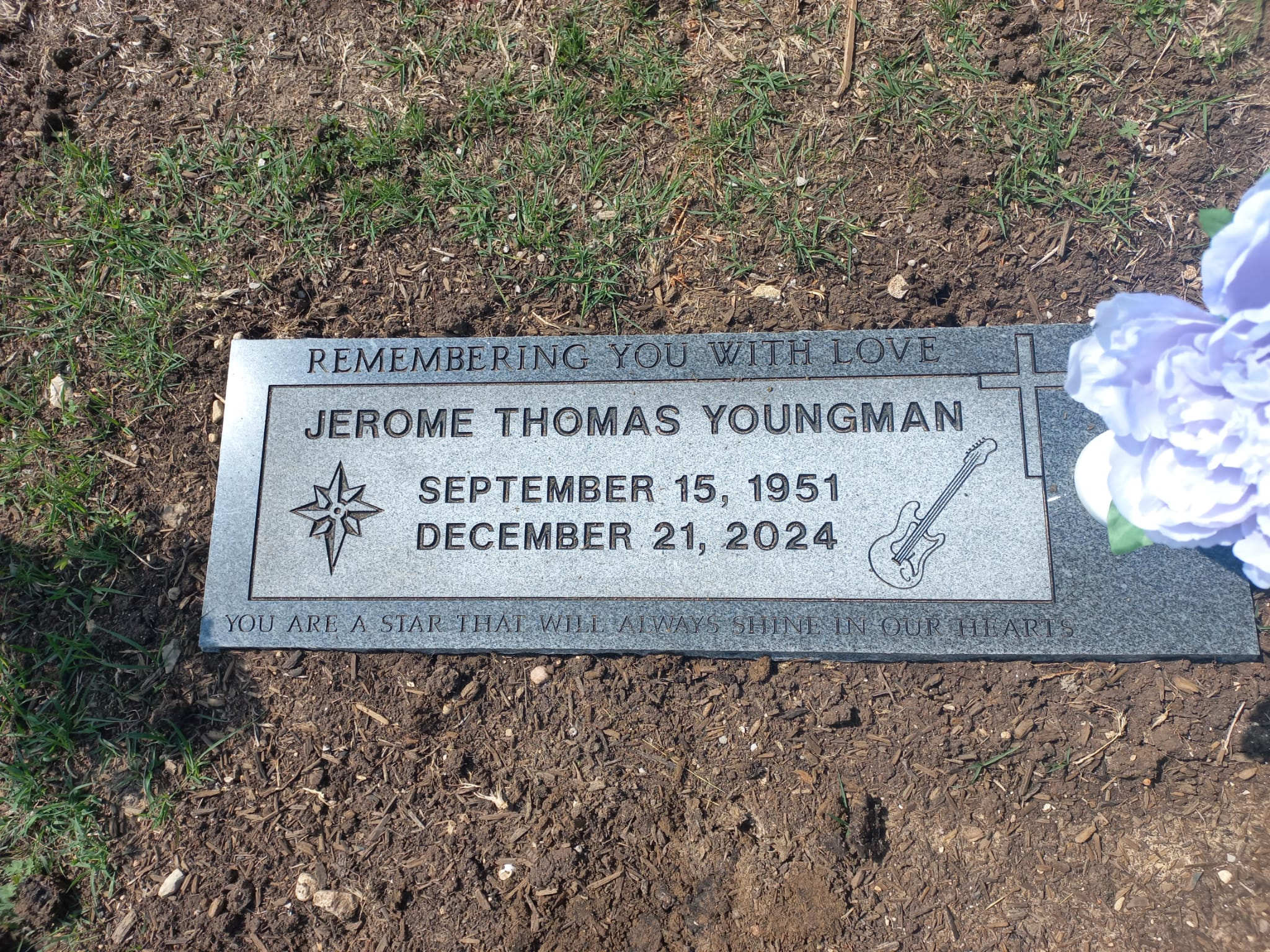
Memorial at Resurrection Cemetery, Cordi-Marian, Texas

Youngman died at the age of 73 on December 21, 2024, in his home in Austin, Texas, following a diagnosis of prostate cancer. He is interred at Resurrection Cemetery in San Antonio, Texas. He was survived by his wife of 34 years, Rocio Youngman.

== Discography ==
=== Albums ===
- No Deposit No Return (Hooks) (1981)
- Safe Sex Sucks (Mutant Press) (1990)
- Bob had a Gerbil (Mutant Press) (1992)
- I'm Ultra Black (mutant press) (1993)
- Damage Guy (Mutant Press) (1995)
- Bring it to Jerome (Mutant Press) (2000)
- Strung Out On You (Mutant Press) (2001)
- World of Fuzz (Mutant Press) (2002)
- Mutant Press (Mutant Press) (2003)
- Blood for Oil (Mutant Press and Friends) (2003)
- Hole in my Heart (Mutant Press) (2003)
- Evil (Mutant Press) (2004)
- Slave to Fashion (Mutant Press) (2005)
- Idiots Rule (Mutant Press) (2006)
- Music for Elevators (Mutant Press) (2007)
- Don't Mess with Mutant Press (Mutant Press) (2008)
- How y'all Doin'...? (Mutant Press) (2010)
- Kill for Peace (Mutant Press) (2011)
- Sister Ray (Mutant Press) (2014)
- Let the Kids Dance (Mutant Press) (2016)
- Hand of Fate (Mutant Press) (2018)

=== Singles ===
- "Unter der Faust" (Ripper) (1977)
- "Lipstick on Your Collar" (Hooks) (1980)
- "Young and Boring" (Hooks) (1980)
- "Creeps at my Door" (Hooks) (1981)
- "I Need More" (Reverend Jerome T. Youngman) (1985)

== Filmography ==
=== Soundtracks ===
- Dead Leaves (film) (2004) Film Director: Constantin Werner
- Rob and Big MTV television show (2006)

== Awards ==
- Bring It To Jerome (Best Cable TV Show) Metro Times Best of Detroit Reader's Poll (1995)
