= Garland Jeffreys (album) =

Studio album by Garland Jeffreys
- Released: 1973
- Studio: Record Plant, New York City; "Bound to Get Ahead Someday" Dynamic Sounds Studio, Kingston, Jamaica
- Genre: Rock
- Label: Atlantic
- Producer: Michael Cuscuna, Garland Jeffreys

Garland Jeffreys chronology
Grinder's Switch featuring Garland Jeffreys (1970)	Garland Jeffreys (1973)	Ghost Writer (1977)

Professional ratings
Review scores
Source	Rating
Christgau's Record Guide	B+

Garland Jeffreys is the first solo album by Garland Jeffreys. It was released by Atlantic Records in 1973 and recorded at the Record Plant, New York City except "Bound to Get Ahead Someday" which was recorded in Kingston, Jamaica.

== Track listing ==
All tracks composed by Garland Jeffreys

1. "Ballad of Me" - 2:55
2. "Harlem Bound" - 3:48
3. "Calcutta Monsoon" - 4:52
4. "Bound to Get Ahead Someday" - 3:43
5. "Lovelight" - 4:16
6. "She Didn't Lie" - 5:50
7. "True to Me" - 2:25
8. "Lon Chaney" - 4:05
9. "Eggs" - 5:03
10. "Zoo" - 2:15

== Personnel ==
- Garland Jeffreys - vocals, acoustic guitar, percussion
- Patti Austin - backing vocals
- David Bromberg - dobro
- Don Brooks - harmonica
- Lynford "Hux" Brown, Geoffrey Chung, Alan Freedman - guitar
- Lori Burton - backing vocals
- Richard Davis, Chuck Rainey - bass guitar
- Dr. John - piano, organ
- Winston Grennan, Jimmy Johnson, Jr., Bernard Purdie - drums
- Paul Griffin - keyboards
- Neville Hinds - organ
- Denzel Laing - percussion
- Ralph MacDonald - congas, percussion
- Mike Mainieri - vibraphone, vocals
- Adam Miller - backing vocals
- David "Fathead" Newman - tenor saxophone
- Chris Osborne - slide guitar
- Larry Packer - violin, viola
- The Persuasions - backing vocals
- Albertine Robinson - backing vocals
- John Simon, Winston Wright - piano
- Maretha Stewart - backing vocals

Technical

- Carlton Lee, Dennis Ferrante, Jack Douglas, Roy Cicala - engineers
- Anne Abelman - design
- Steve Levitt - photography
