= Guts for Love =

Studio album by Garland Jeffreys
- Released: 1983
- Genre: Rock, Reggae
- Label: Epic
- Producer: Bob Clearmountain, Garland Jeffreys

Garland Jeffreys chronology
Rock 'n' Roll Adult (1981)	Guts for Love (1983)	Don't Call Me Buckwheat (1991)

Professional ratings
Review scores
Source	Rating
AllMusic	3/5 stars
Robert Christgau	C+
The Encyclopedia of Popular Music	3/5 stars
The Philadelphia Inquirer	4/5 stars
The Rolling Stone Album Guide	2.5/5 stars

Guts for Love is an album by Garland Jeffreys, released by Epic Records in 1983. It was produced by Bob Clearmountain and Jeffreys. Due to record company issues, the album was released a year later than originally scheduled.

The album peaked at No. 176 on the Billboard 200.

== Critical reception ==
Robert Christgau wrote that "Jeffreys's odd weakness for rock without roll is the ruination of this overproduced, undercomposed anachronism—even the reggae grooves are tinged with synthesized AOR melodrama, and the dance numbers do not jump jump." The Boston Globe called Guts for Love "a standout album," writing that "it has a snappy live feel, for nine of the songs were laid down in two takes, the other in three."

== Track listing ==
All tracks composed by Garland Jeffreys; except where indicated

1. "Real Man" - 3:41
2. "Surrender" - 3:56
3. "Fidelity" - 4:21
4. "Rebel Love" - 3:03
5. "Dance Up" (Garland Jeffreys, Alan Freedman) - 3:08
6. "Guts for Love" - 3:39
7. "Shout" - 5:05
8. "What Does It Take (To Win Your Love)" (Johnny Bristol, Harvey Fuqua, Vernon Bullock) - 2:46
9. "Loneliness" - 3:46
10. "El Salvador" - 4:32
11. "American Backslide" - 3:51

== Personnel ==
- Garland Jeffreys – guitars, percussion, vocals
- Robin Clark – backing vocals
- Dennis Davis – drums, percussion
- Lew Del Gatto – horns
- Tyrone Downie – keyboards
- Larry Fast – piano, synthesizer
- Alan "Taff" Freedman – guitars
- Diva Gray – backing vocals
- Paul Griffin – keyboards
- Gordon Grody – backing vocals
- Lani Groves – backing vocals
- Tony Levin – bass
- Tom "Bones" Malone – trombone
- Lou Marini – saxophone
- Jimmy Maelen – percussion
- Hugh McCracken – guitars, harmonica, classical guitar on "El Salvador"
- Alan Rubin – trumpet
- David Sanborn – alto saxophone solo on "What Does It Take (To Win Your Love)"
- G.E. Smith – guitars, bass
- David Van Tieghem – percussion, marimba
