= Escape Artist (Garland Jeffreys album) =

Studio album by Garland Jeffreys
- Released: 1981
- Studio: Power Station, New York City; except "Miami Beach" and "We the People" at Studio 80, London
- Genre: Rock, Reggae
- Label: A&M, Epic
- Producer: Bob Clearmountain, Garland Jeffreys; "Miami Beach" and "We the People" Dennis Bovell

Garland Jeffreys chronology
American Boy & Girl (1979)	Escape Artist (1981)	Rock 'n' Roll Adult (1982)

Professional ratings
Review scores
Source	Rating
AllMusic	4.5/5 stars
Robert Christgau	B+
The Encyclopedia of Popular Music	3/5 stars
MusicHound Rock: The Essential Album Guide	3.5/5 stars
The Rolling Stone Album Guide	4/5 stars

Escape Artist is an album by Garland Jeffreys, released in 1981 by Epic Records. The album originally included the EP Escapades. The cover photography is by Anton Corbijn.

The album peaked at No. 59 on the Billboard 200.

== Production ==
The album was produced by Jeffreys and Bob Clearmountain, with added EP tracks produced by Dennis Bovell. The backing band included musicians from the E Street Band, the Wailers, and the Rumour, as well as guitarists Chuck Hammer and Adrian Belew.

== Critical reception ==
AllMusic called the album "a set of tough, witty songs that dealt with the personal and the political, backed by an exceptional studio band that included members of Lou Reed's band, Bruce Springsteen's E-Street Band and Graham Parker's Rumour." The Washington Post wrote that "this is essentially the same stuff that made your parents wince and your girlfriend wiggle, back when rock'n 'roll aspired less to Art than to aphrodisia." Time wrote: "Jeffreys' ambitious and sophisticated synthesis of rock, reggae and jazz could easily become top-heavy. The cool inflections of his passion, however, keep the songs strong and upright, buttressed both by a flair for elegant concert showmanship and a voice that sounds like Frankie Lymon with a college education."

== Track listing ==
All tracks composed by Garland Jeffreys, except where indicated

1. "Modern Lovers" - 3:59
2. "Christine" - 3:30
3. "Ghost of a Chance" - 2:49
4. "96 Tears" (Rudy Martinez) - 3:08
5. "Innocent" - 2:21
6. "True Confessions" - 4:33
7. "R.O.C.K." - 3:56
8. "Graveyard Rock" - 4:36
9. "Mystery Kids" - 7:08
10. "Jump Jump" - 4:37

=== "Escapades" 7" ===
1. "Lover's Walk" (lyrics: Garland Jeffreys; music: Alan Freeman, Andrew Bodnar, Danny Federici, G.E. Smith, Garland Jeffreys, Roy Bittan, Steve Goulding) - 4:46
2. "Christine" - 4:35
3. "Miami Beach" - 4:53
4. "We the People" - 4:27

== Charts ==
Chart (1981)	Peak position
Australian (Kent Music Report)	80

== Personnel ==
- Garland Jeffreys - lead and backing vocals, guitar
- Robert Athas - guitars, bass
- Adrian Belew - guitars, bagpipe guitar
- Big Youth - toasting, vocals on "Graveyard Rock"
- Roy Bittan - piano
- Eaton "Jah" Blake - bass on "Miami Beach" and "We the People"
- Andrew Bodnar - bass
- Dennis "Blackbeard" Bovell - guitars, keyboards, percussion on "Miami Beach" and "We the People"
- Michael Brecker - tenor saxophone
- Randy Brecker - trumpet
- Bob Clearmountain - producer, mixer, backing vocals
- Larry Fast - synthesizer
- Danny Federici - accordion, keyboards
- Alan "Taff" Freedman - guitars, music consultant
- Artie Funaro - guitars, keyboards
- Steve Goulding - drums, percussion, backing vocals
- Diana Grasselli - backing vocals
- Chuck Hammer - guitarsynth, guitarchitecture, on "Mystery Kids" and "Jump Jump"
- Nona Hendryx - "hung jury" vocals on "Innocent"
- David Johansen - "hung jury" vocals on "Innocent"
- Susan Blond - "hung jury" vocals on "Innocent"
- Linton Kwesi Johnson - vocals/narration on "Miami Beach"
- Webster Johnson - keyboards, percussion on "Miami Beach" and "We the People"
- John Kpiaye - guitars on "Miami Beach" and "We the People"
- Earl "Wire" Lindo - organ
- Jimmy Maelen - percussion
- Errol "Tamah" Melbourne - drums on "Miami Beach" and "We the People"
- Seyoum Net Fa - melodica on "Miami Beach" and "We the People"
- Lou Reed - backing vocals on "Innocent"
- G.E. Smith - guitars, fuzz bass, mandolin
- Augustus "I" Tenyve (Henry Tenyue) - saxophone, trombone on "Miami Beach" and "We the People"
- Myriam Naomi Valle - backing vocals
- Maria Vidal - backing vocals
- Patric "Zebulon" Tenyve (Patrick Tenyue) - flugelhorn on "Miami Beach" and "We the People"

Technical

- Dick Wingate - Executive Producer
- Barbara Spiegel - production coordinator
- Dave Greenberg, Raymond Willard - engineer
