= Don't Call Me Buckwheat =

Don’t Call Me Buckwheat

Studio album by Garland Jeffreys
- Released: 1992
- Studio: Power Station, New York City
- Genre: Rock, reggae
- Label: RCA
- Producer: Garland Jeffreys

Garland Jeffreys chronology
Guts for Love (1983)	Don’t Call Me Buckwheat (1992)	Matador & More... (1992)

Don't Call Me Buckwheat is an album by Garland Jeffreys. It was released in 1992 by RCA Records, his first album in nine years. The title of the album is a reference to a derogatory remark directed toward Jeffreys at a Mets game.

The lead single "Hail Hail Rock n Roll" reached number 12 on the German Singles chart and spent 24 weeks in total on the chart.

Dutch director Anton Corbijn was responsible for the album's cover photography. He directed the video for "Hail Hail Rock n Roll", which was played on heavy rotation on MTV Europe.

== Production ==
The album was produced by Jeffreys. Bernard Purdie, Vernon Reid, and Sly and Robbie appear on the album.

== Critical reception ==
Professional ratings
Review scores
Source	Rating
AllMusic	4.5/5 stars
Calgary Herald	C−
Robert Christgau	(1-star Honorable Mention)
The Encyclopedia of Popular Music	3/5 stars
The Rolling Stone Album Guide	4/5 stars

The New York Times wrote that "most of the cuts on the record are impassioned autobiographical reflections on racial and ethnic identity and the struggle for self-esteem by a veteran New York songwriter who is of mixed ancestry: black, white and Puerto Rican." The Chicago Tribune deemed Don't Call Me Buckwheat "an angry album, but it also is a very vulnerable and moving one as well ... There are no simple solutions or empty slogans here." Rolling Stone wrote that it "suffers from having perhaps received a little too much help from Jeffreys's friends ... One hopes that at some point Jeffreys will hook up with a band that's capable of a little spontaneous combustion, as opposed to the airtight perfection of studio pros." Stereo Review called it "a career high-water mark ... how many other fortysomething rockers can make such a claim?"

No Depression called the album "one of the signature discs" of the 1990s.

== Track listing ==
All tracks composed by Garland Jeffreys

1. "Moonshine in the Cornfield" - 1:03
2. "Welcome to the World" - 4:07
3. "Don't Call Me Buckwheat" - 4:19
4. "Color Line" - 4:14
5. "Hail Hail Rock 'n' Roll" - 3:52
6. "I Was Afraid of Malcolm" - 4:26
7. "Bottle of Love" 3:55
8. "The Answer" - 4:42
9. "Racial Repertoire" - 4:55
10. "Spanish Blood" - 4:26
11. "Lonelyville" - 4:43
12. "Murder Jubilee" - 3:57
13. "I'm Not a Know It All" - 2:54

== Personnel ==
- Garland Jeffreys - vocals, arrangements, production
- Robby Ameen - percussion on "Spanish Blood"
- Jeff Bova - keyboards, synthesizer, sequencing
- Michael Brecker - saxophone, keyboards
- Heidi Iden Carney - strings
- Porter Carroll - vocals
- Jill Dell'Abate - vocals, production co-ordination
- Sly Dunbar - drums, percussion on "Color Line" and "Murder Jubilee"
- Bob Franceschini - saxophone on "Spanish Blood"
- Alan "Taff" Freedman - guitars, bass guitar
- Diva Gray - vocals
- Paul Griffin - piano, organ, assistant arranger
- Gordon Grody - vocals
- Jean Ingraham - strings
- Steve Jordan - drums, percussion
- Karen Karsrud - strings
- Kathryn Kienke - strings
- Jay Leonhart - bass guitar
- Jesse Levy - strings
- J.T. Lewis - drums on "Lonelyville"
- Steve Love - guitars on "Lonelyville"
- Hugh McCracken - guitars
- Ozzie Melendez - trombone, trumpet
- Joe Mennonna - accordion, bass guitar, drum programming, saxophones, keyboards, trombone, vocals, arrangements
- Sidney Mills - keyboards
- Eugene J. Moye - strings
- Janice Pendarvis - vocals
- Carol Pool - strings
- Bernard Purdie - drums
- Jamie Ramos - trombone
- Vernon Reid - guitars on "Hail Hail Rock 'n' Roll" and "I Was Afraid of Malcolm"
- Deborah Resto - vocals
- Elliot Rosoff - strings
- Robbie Shakespeare - bass guitar
- Claudette Sierra - vocals
- Earl "Chinna" Smith - guitars
- G.E. Smith - guitars
- Vaneese Thomas - vocals
- Handel Tucker - keyboards
- Raymond Vega - saxophone, trumpet on "Spanish Blood"
