= Mutant Press =

US musical group

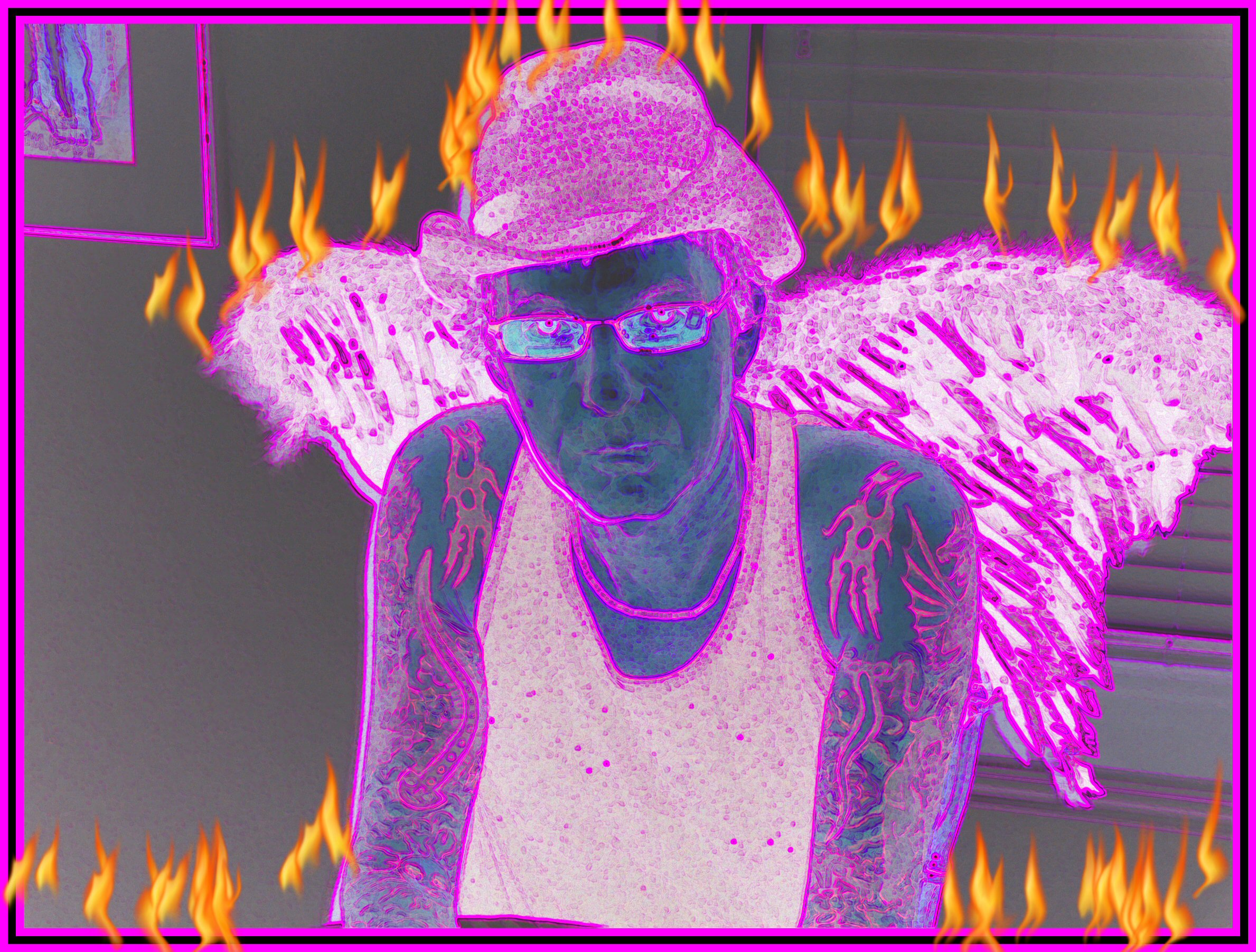
- Don't Mess with Mutant Press (Austin, TX)

Background information
- Genres: Rock, hard rock, punk rock, punk blues
- Years active: 1990–2021
- Label: 500 Pound Weasel Records
- Past members: Jerome T. Youngman (guitar, vocals), Danielle Arsenault (dancer, vocals); Phil Cohen (drums, vocals); Steve Loria(The Heavy Weasel) (bass); Steve McCormick (drums, vocals)); Max Murphy (bass, vocals)
- Website: mutantpress.com

Mutant Press is an American political rock band created by Jerome T. Youngman in Hollywood, California in 1990.

== History ==
In 1990, Jerome T. Youngman started Mutant Press a political hard rock band in Hollywood, California. Mutant Press first job was headlining international act at the LUC club in Mexico City in 1990. In 1992 Youngman returned to Detroit, Michigan, where dancer Danielle Arsenault joined Mutant Press.

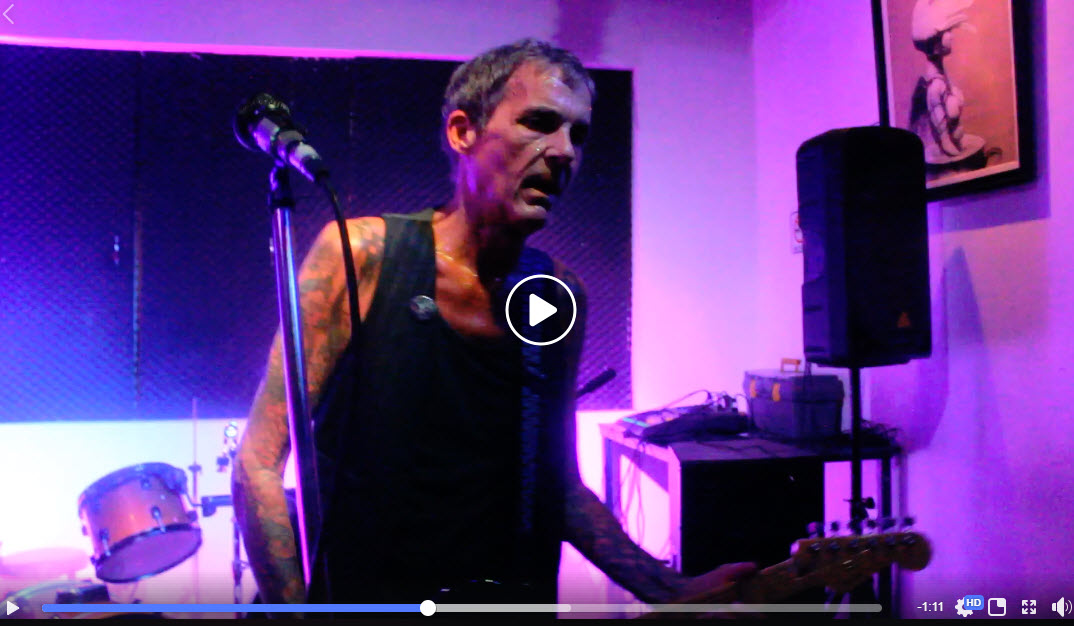
Mutant Press performance Capitan Gallo Mexico City May 2018

From 1996 to 2004, Youngman managed his recording studio, 500 Pound Weasel Records, in Southfield, Michigan, where he released fourteen Mutant Press albums, and produced over 200 CD's for local Rap, Hip hop, and Punk Rock Detroit artists. Frank Moore and Mikee Labash (Love Underground Visionary Revolution) from San Francisco joined the creative team after the 2004 Mothers’ day performance at Kimos. The same year, Mikee Labash created the art for the album Evil.

In October 2004, Mutant Press moved to Long Beach, California. The band performed at Que Sera, Doll Hut, Mr. T's, and many other Los Angeles and Long Beach clubs. In 2005, Mutant Press released the album Idiots Rule with Youngman, The Heavy Weasel (Steve Loria, Spirit (band)), and Phil Cohen (The Heaters). In 2007, MTV licensed Idiots Rule to use songs for the Rob and Big reality show.

In January 2008, Mutant Press moved to Austin, Texas. The band played in 2008 South by Southwest Festival (SXSW). The band has become regulars on the 6th street music scene, and they released a new album Don't mess with Mutant Press that is getting international airplay.

Mutant Press received outstanding reviews. In 2003, Blood for Oil appeared in the Robert Christgau's Choice Cuts column in the Village Voice newspaper. In 2007, Robert Christgau wrote "if the MC5 hadn't kicked the bucket, they'd be older and grayer than these guys, but not louder or more revolutionary".

== Latest productions ==
Sister Ray record was produced after the death of Lou Reed. During the production of Let the Kids Dance both David Bowie and Prince died. A CD release party for Hand of Fate was held at Capitan Gallo in downtown Mexico City on May 16, 2018.

== Discography ==
=== Albums ===
- Safe Sex (Mutant Press) (1990)
- Bob had a Gerbil (Mutant Press) (1992)
- Ultra Black (Mutant Press) (1993)
- Damage Guy (Mutant Press) (1996)
- Bring it to Jerome (Mutant Press) (2000)
- Strung Out On You (Mutant Press) (2001)
- World of Fuzz (Mutant Press) (2002)
- Mutant Press (Mutant Press) (2003)
- Blood for Oil (Mutant Press and Friends) (2003)
- Hole in my Heart (Mutant Press) (Mutant Press) (2003)
- Evil (Mutant Press) (2004)
- Slave to Fashion (Mutant Press) (2005)
- Idiots Rule (Mutant Press) (2006)
- Music for Elevators (Mutant Press) (2007)
- Don't Mess with Mutant Press (Mutant Press) (2008)
- How y'all Doin'...? (Mutant Press) (2009)
- Kill for Peace (Mutant Press) (2011)
- Sister Ray (Mutant Press) (2014)
- Let the Kids Dance (Mutant Press) (2016)
- Hand of Fate (Mutant Press) (2018)
