= The Simpleton (Messerschmidt) =

- Der Schaafkopf (German)
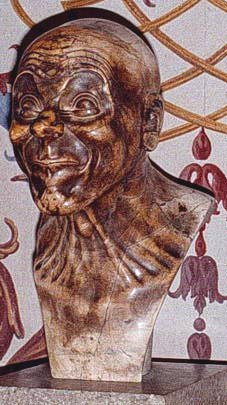
- Artist: Franz Xaver Messerschmidt
- Year: 1777 - 1783
- Medium: alabaster
- Dimensions: 43 cm × 23 cm × 32 cm (17 in × 9.1 in × 13 in)
- Location: Österreichische Galerie Belvedere; Vienna

The Simpleton (German: Der Schaafkopf) is a sculpture bust by Franz Xaver Messerschmidt, one of the Character Heads.

== Description ==
The sculptures dimensions are 43 × 23 × 32 centimeters. It is in the collection of the Österreichische Galerie Belvedere, in Vienna.

== Analysis ==
The bust is one 64 "canonical grimaces" of the human face using himself as a model.

In 1781, German author Friedrich Nicolai visited Messerschmidt at his studio in Pressburg and subsequently published a transcript of their conversation. It appears that for many years Messerschmidt had been suffering from an undiagnosed digestive complaint, now believed to be Crohn's disease, which caused him considerable discomfort. In order to focus his thoughts away from his condition, Messerschmidt devised a series of pinches he administered to his right lower rib. Observing the resulting facial expressions in a mirror, Messerschmidt then set about recording them in marble and bronze.
