= Roy Cicala =

American record producer and engineer (1939–2014)

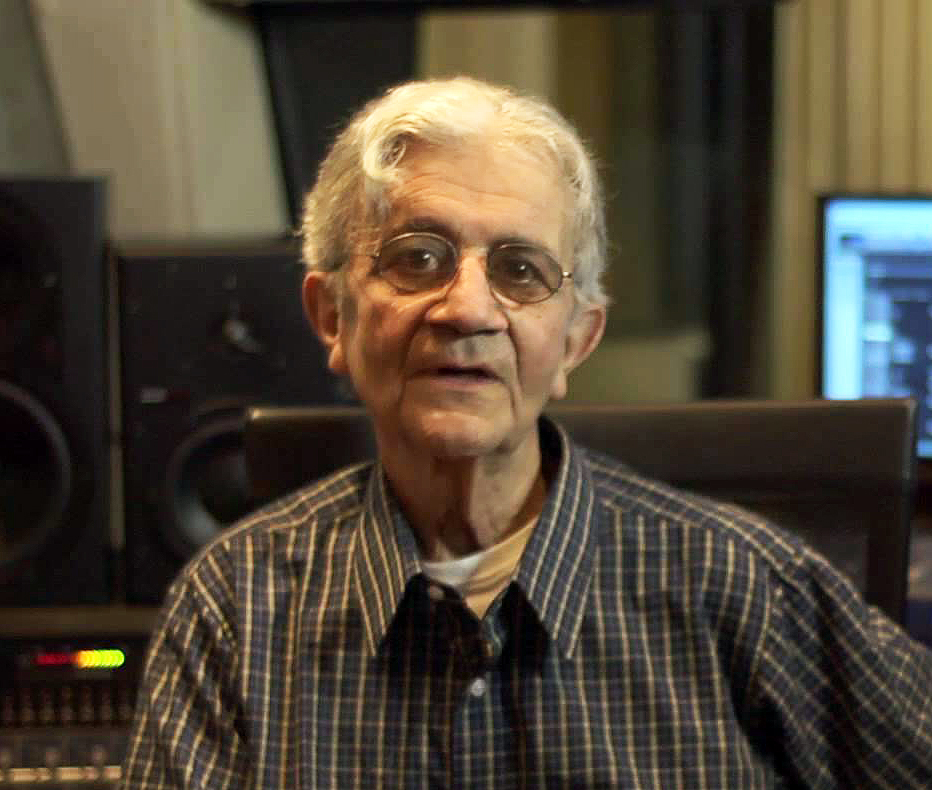
Roy Cicala Brazil Photo

Roy Joel Cicala (March 28, 1939 – January 22, 2014) was an American producer, engineer, songwriter and musician. His body of work includes over 10 Platinum Records for producing, writing, engineering and management for talent from the 1970s through to 2014.

== Biography ==
Roy Cicala was born Roy Joel Cicala in New Haven, Connecticut. Since his 1968 start at Record Plant Studios in New York, he recorded and produced some of the greatest artists of modern music, including Cab Calloway, John Lennon, Aretha Franklin, Four Seasons, Madonna, Elvis Presley, Elton John, Bruce Springsteen, Sting, Frank Sinatra, Dire Straits, Jimi Hendrix, David Bowie, Harry Nilsson, Miles Davis, Chick Corea, Ray Charles, Queen, Aerosmith, Bon Jovi, Liza Minnelli, Roberta Flack, Patti La Belle, Van Morrison, Don McLean, The Who, Johnny Winter, Crosby, Stills, Nash and Young, Frank Zappa, Lou Reed, Prince, Santana, Sarah Vaughan, Charles Mingus, Franklin Kiermyer with Pharoah Sanders and many others.

Cicala began working freelance engineering jobs in New York when he took over Record Plant Studios piloting mega-albums hits as chief engineer. He was an engineer on the first album ever recorded at Record Plant Studios, Electric Ladyland by The Jimi Hendrix Experience, released in 1968. Through the years, he worked on hundreds of albums. During the 1970s, house engineers Shelly Yakus and Roy Cicala gave many local bands their start by donating session time and materials to upcoming artists, engineering and producing their demo tapes. While at Record Plant, Cicala was involved with a wide range of projects, including doing the remote work for the "Live Aid" concert in 1985. Record Plant closed in 1989.

Cicala first worked with John Lennon just before The Beatles broke up in 1970. Cicala did engineering work for Lennon and Ono on various albums, including Imagine, Mind Games and Double Fantasy.

== Works ==
Selected engineering, production and Record Plant NYC credits

- The Jimi Hendrix Experience: Electric Ladyland – 1967-68
- Frank Sinatra: Watertown - 1969
- Four Seasons: "Genuine Imitation Life Gazette" - 1969
- John Lennon: Imagine – 1971
- John Lennon & Yoko Ono: Sometime in New York City - 1972
- John Lennon: Mind Games - 1973
- John Lennon: Walls and Bridges -1974
- Aerosmith: Get Your Wings – 1973-74
- Bruce Springsteen: Born to Run – 1974-75
- Aerosmith: Toys in the Attic – 1975
- John Lennon: Rock and Roll - 1975
- Bruce Springsteen: Darkness on the Edge of Town – 1977-78
- Patti Smith Group: Easter – 1978
- David Bowie: Lodger – 1979
- Jerome T. Youngman & Hooks: Young and Boring – 1980
- John Lennon & Yoko Ono: Double Fantasy - 1980
- AC/DC: Who Made Who - 1986
- Franklin Kiermyer with Pharoah Sanders: Solomon's Daughter - 1994
- Patti Smith: Peace and Noise - 1997
- Forgotten Boys: Louva-a-Deus – 2007
- Garland Jeffreys: The King of In Between – 2011
- Optic Yellow Felt:Optic Yellow Felt - 2011
- The Moondogs: "Black & White Woman" - 2013

Selected live engineering, production and Record Plant Remote credits

- George Harrison & Friends, Concert for Bangladesh, Madison Square Garden - August 1, 1971
- Elton John, Concert on the Great Lawn in Central Park in New York City - September 13, 1980
- Live Aid - a multi-venue rock music concert. July 13, 1985.

Selected songwriting credits

- John Lennon: Incantation - 1974

Other credits

- John Lennon: Walls and Bridges: Strings and Remixing
- Johnny Rivers: "Secret Agent Man" - Theme to the American Broadcast of the British series Danger Man.

Cicala had been working in Brazil since the 1970s in various engineering and production capacities. He was producing and managing major label artists like Charlie Brown Jr. at the newly launched Record Plant South. He sat on the advisory board for a New York City-based start-up founded by his nephew Craig Alberino.
