= Simpleton (reggae musician) =

Jamaican reggae musician (died 2004)

- Born: Christopher Harrison
- Origin: Saint Andrew Parish, Jamaica
- Genres: Reggae, ska
- Years active: 1992–2004
- Labels: Greensleeves, VA, JP

Simpleton (born Christopher Harrison, Saint Andrew Parish, Jamaica, c. 3 November 1971 (Note: Some sources list Harrison's birthday as November 25; however, since his obituary gives his age at his death as 33, and the former date is that given by the majority of sources, it is preferred here.) – 7 November 2004) was a Jamaican reggae musician whose claim to fame was the 1992 hit single "Coca Cola Shape". (Note: Though the song is often listed as "Coca Cola Bottle Shape"—matching the actual refrain within the song—the original title, as-released, was simply "Coca Cola Shape".)

== Biography ==
Earlier records by this artist list his name as Dracula (rather than Simpleton), under the label "How Yu Fi Sey Dat?". Simpleton released three reggae albums in the mid-1990s. After being virtually absent from the Jamaican music scene, Simpleton died from a heart attack on November 7, 2004, in Kingston, Jamaica.

== Discography ==
- Coca Cola Shape (1992)
- 1/4 to 12 (1996)
- Drive Man Crazy (1998)
