= Garland Jeffreys =

American musician (born 1943)

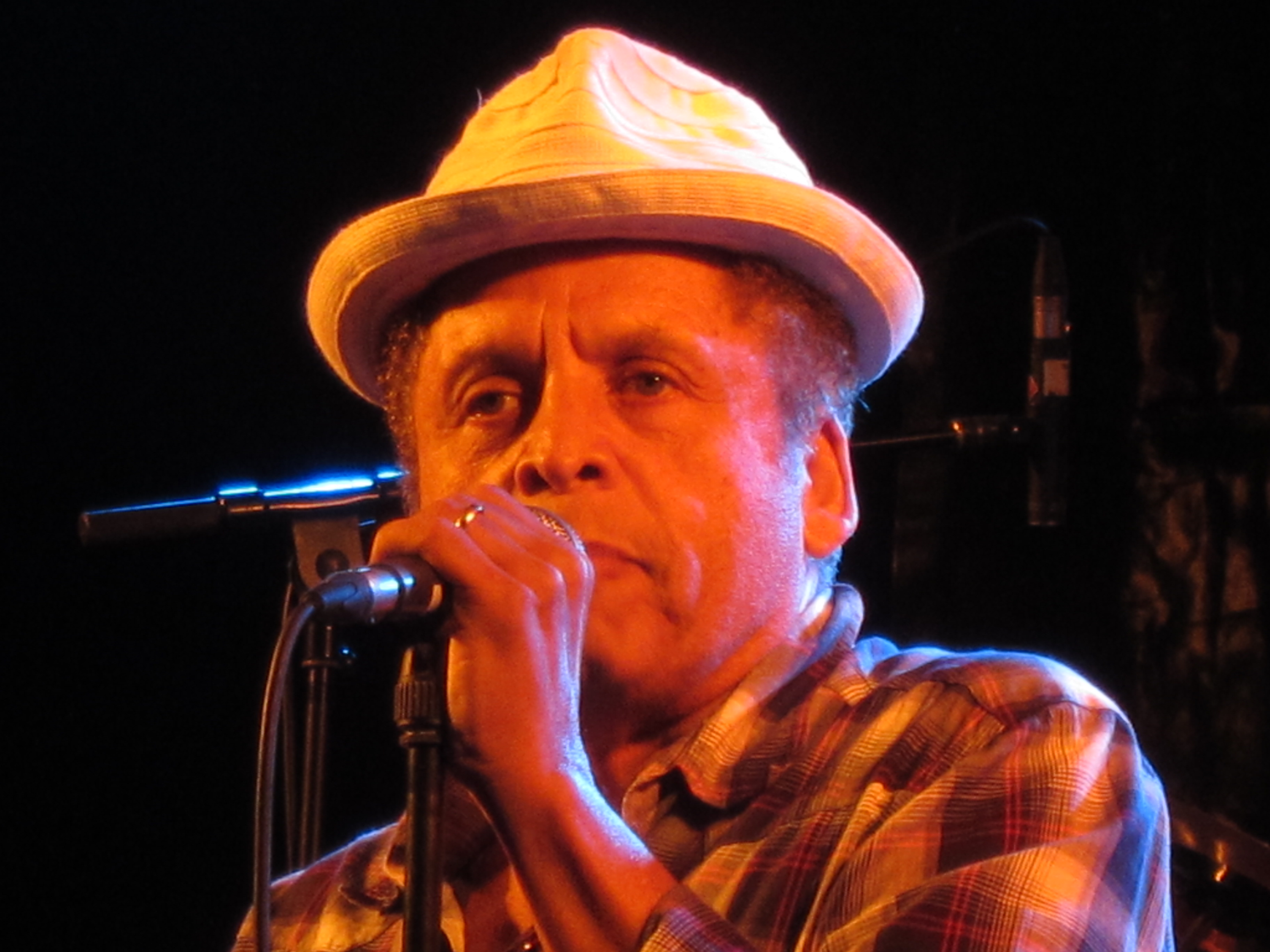

Background information
- Born: June 29, 1943 (age 83); Brooklyn, New York City
- Genres: Rock and roll, Americana, reggae, blues, soul
- Occupations: Musician, songwriter, record producer
- Instruments: Vocals, guitar
- Years active: 1966–2019
- Labels: Atlantic, A&M, Epic, RCA/BMG, Universal, Luna Park
- Spouse: Claire Jeffreys
- Website: garlandjeffreys.com

Garland Jeffreys (born 1943) is an American musician, singer and songwriter. He emerged as part of a distinct, mid-1970s New York rock sound that included artists like Bruce Springsteen, Southside Johnny and Willie Nile. Hallmarks of Jeffreys's music are autobiographical songwriting and an eclectic, hard-to-categorize style that embraces rock-and-roll, reggae, soul, doo-wop, blues, jazz and folk. His songs revolve around signature themes: race and inclusivity, New York City and urban life, romance and family. Critics contend that Jeffreys's category-defying music and multiracial identity often perplexed American record labels, radio stations and audiences, hampering the marketing and reach of his work. Rock writer Kurt Loder described Jeffreys as "a unique voice in American music—a racial and cultural outsider with a first-hand, hard-knocks knowledge of all the various Big City scenes and scams, and a striking ability to render even the grittiest incidents concisely into songs."

Jeffreys sustained a following in New York from the 1970s forward, however his broader fan base grew more strongly in Europe than in the United States. In the US, he is best known for the albums Ghost Writer (1977), Escape Artist (1981) and The King of In Between (2011), and the widely covered underground single, "Wild in the Streets"; in Europe, he is also known for the album American Boy & Girl (1979) and hit single "Matador." In 2023, a documentary on Jeffreys's life and career came out, Garland Jeffreys: The King of In Between.

== Early life and career ==
Jeffreys was born William Garland Jeffreys in 1943 and grew up in Sheepshead Bay, Brooklyn, a child of black, white and Puerto Rican heritage. A difficult childhood included his father leaving when Jeffreys was two, an abusive stepfather, and a neighborhood that was intolerant of racial diversity. He was involved in music from an early age, taking piano lessons at seven, singing doo-wop on street corners, and sneaking into Greenwich Village jazz clubs in his early teens. In the early 1960s, his stepfather worked two jobs to send him to Syracuse University, where he majored in art history. While there he befriended fellow students and music fans Lou Reed and Felix Cavaliere and received a scholarship to study art in Florence—a formative experience.

After completing his studies in 1966, Jeffreys began playing at Manhattan nightclubs like Gerde's Folk City and The Bitter End, sometimes partnering with Reed and John Cale. His performances then—and later at Reno Sweeney—often combined cabaret with racial themes, employing props, makeup, blackface masks and a rag doll persona he called "Ramon."

In 1969, Jeffreys played guitar and contributed the song "Fairweather Friend" to John Cale's 1969 debut solo album, Vintage Violence. He also founded the band Grinder's Switch with pianist Stan Szelest, guitarist Ernie Corallo and percussionist Sandy Konikoff. Before dissolving in 1970, they released a self-titled album overseen by Astral Weeks-producer Lewis Merenstein, which Robert Christgau and others noted for Jeffreys's songwriting and a sound reminiscent of The Band.

== Solo musical career ==
Jeffreys's solo music fuses diverse styles, personal songwriting and lyrics that can be confrontational, observational or elliptical, within albums often focused around a topic. Recurrent subjects include race, identity, his struggle to find a place in the white world of 1970s–1980s rock, troubled youth, and in later work, hard-won wisdom and mortality. His work also serves as a long-running chronicle of the appeal, struggle and danger of urban life across New York City's five boroughs. Rock critic Jay Cocks wrote: "A Jeffreys record is like a fast cruise across the radio band. Reggae, jazz and full-tilt rock all blend with casual finesse. This is big-city soul music born of tough beginnings and hard realities. Soul music for sole survivors."

Jeffreys's musical eclecticism is matched by vocal versatility that critics suggest can range from swagger to cool intimacy. Rolling Stone's Jim Farber wrote that Jeffreys blended "the sardonic cadence of Lou Reed" and the "theatrical blast" of Bruce Springsteen; others note a relaxed register recalling Johnny Nash or Bill Withers. New York Times rock critic Robert Palmer contended that performance lay at the heart of Jeffreys's music: an energetic style "compounded of reggae influences, basic guitar rock, Mick Jaggerish self‐delectation, New York City street references, and a willingness to parade his private humiliations and victories before an audience in a potentially self-lacerating way." In addition to Jagger, Jeffrey's stage presence has been likened to the prowling authority of Arthur Lee of Love.

=== Solo career, 1973–1983 ===
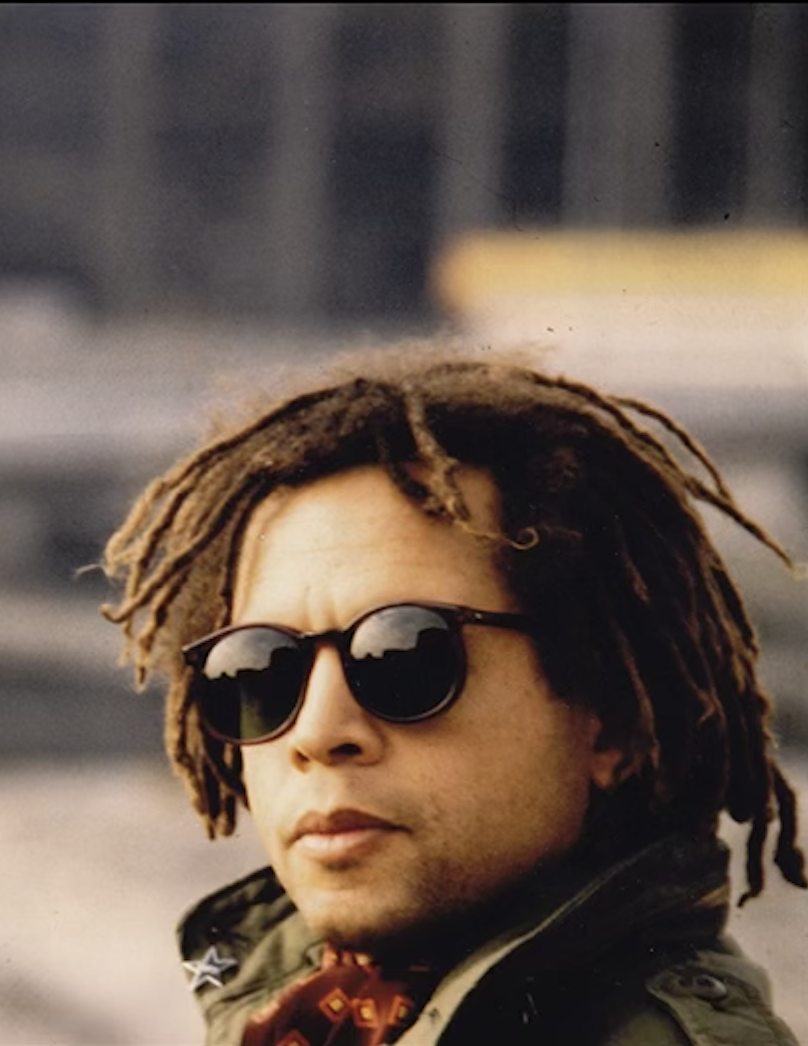
Garland Jeffreys, circa 1980

Despite the commercial failure of the Grinder's Switch record, Jeffreys landed a solo contract with Atlantic Records, which yielded the folk- and jazz-flavored album Garland Jeffreys (1973), with guests Dr. John, David Bromberg and David Newman. It more fully introduced his writing in songs that critics characterized as witty, mordant observations of urban blight and bittersweet experience—among them, "Harlem Bound," the identity-themed "Ballad of Me," and the early reggae tune, "Bound to Get Ahead Someday!" Shortly after, he released the single, "Wild in the Streets". Both album and single received positive critical attention but were commercially unsuccessful; four years later the track would become his best-known and most-played song.

After a stint on the Arista label produced only a failed single, Jeffreys signed with A&M Records. With the release of Ghost Writer (1977), the mainstream music press—Rolling Stone ("most promising artist" of 1977), The Village Voice ("top ten"), PBS Soundstage—declared Jeffreys poised for breakout stardom. The album was a harder-rocking mixture paralleling his heritage, with confident reggae cut with explorations of flamenco ("Spanish Town") and soul (the hometown ode "New York Skyline"), and the FM staples "Wild in the Streets" and "Rough and Ready". Critics identified an overriding theme of determination that united the collection's strongly autobiographical subjects: coming of age and making it in the city ("Ghost Writer"), racial separatism ("Why-O"), interracial romance ("I May Not Be Your Kind"), and the pain of urban childhood ("Cool Down Boy"). Robert Hilburn likened the album "to a cross-town bus ride" with "social dissection reminiscent at times to James Baldwin's Another Country or Martin Scorsese's Mean Streets"; Stephen Holden called it possibly "the quintessential New York rock record."

Jeffrey's follow-up, One-Eyed Jack (1978) struggled to live up to the expectations set by Ghost Writer, receiving mixed reviews. Dedicated to his boyhood idol, Jackie Robinson, the album presented a tonal contrast. Side one offered brighter, optimistic pop-oriented tracks focused on the search for love, like the soul-disco-flavored "She Didn't Lie." Side two included personal, urban songs with biting lyrics (e.g., "Been There and Back") that tapped into 1960s rock ("Oh My Soul"), funk ("Scream in the Night") and reggae. Critics regarded American Boy & Girl (1979) as a more energetic comeback album that updated the Ghost Writer theme of troubled children. Songs like the title track, "City Kids" and "Night of the Living Dead" centered on tough portraits of teen runaways and outsiders taking refuge in drugs and crime in order to survive abuse, neglect and street life. Jeffreys balanced those songs with soothing, emotive tunes of hope and inspiration, such as "Shoot the Moonlight Out" and "Matador," a European hit that charted in several countries' top fives and spurred a successful tour. Jeff Nesin of Creem characterized the album as "urban and urbane," difficult, and slow to reveal.

Escape Artist (1981, Epic Records), yielded Jeffreys's first U.S. commercial success, making the top forty chart, garnering FM airplay for the songs "Modern Lovers," "R.O.C.K." and a cover of the garage-rock classic "96 Tears" (#5 on the US rock chart), and landing on Time Magazine's list of the year's 10 best pop albums. With backing by the UK group The Rumour, Roy Bittan and Danny Federici of the E Street Band, and guests including David Johansen, Lou Reed, G.E. Smith, Adrian Belew and Nona Hendryx, the album was a harder rocking set. Its songs explored growing up in a tough community ("Mystery Kids," "Miami Beach"), music as an escape ("R.O.C.K.," "Graveyard Rock"), and failed romance (the soul-baring "True Confessions" and rueful "Ghost of a Chance"). Jay Cocks called them anthems for "hard, hopeless downtown orphans whose hustle along the thin edge becomes a musical metaphor for political desperation and spiritual desolation"; he described their sound as "buttressed by a flair for elegant concert showmanship and a voice that sounds like Frankie Lymon with a college education." Jeffreys supported the album with a tour backed by The Rumour that was captured on an album released the same year, Rock 'n' Roll Adult.

With expectations high, Jeffreys put out Guts for Love (1983), a departure album with its more polished sound and thematic shift from social concern to love (e.g., the title track, "Fidelity," "Loneliness" and "Real Man"). It received a mixed reception, with some reviewers deeming it a cohesive, personal effort with a "snappy, live feel" and others finding the more radio-friendly production slick and less edgy than previous work.

=== Solo career, 1990s ===
After taking a hiatus from recording, Jeffreys released two new albums in the 1990s, Don't Call Me Buckwheat (1992) and Wildlife Dictionary (1997), (Note: Only released in Europe) and a collection of previous releases, Matador & More... (1992).

Don't Call Me Buckwheat was a concept album that channeled reflections and frustrations about the complexities of race in America while also expressing a sense of inner satisfaction and acceptance. The title was prompted by an incident at a baseball game at Shea Stadium during which, after standing to get a hotdog, Jeffreys was verbally accosted by a heckler who shouted, "Hey Buckwheat, sit down!" The racial epithet stuck with him, spurring several songs, including the title track, "Color Line," "I Was Afraid of Malcolm" and "Racial Repertoire," which examined code-switching. New Yorker critic Ben Greenman described the album as an "essayistic and autobiographical" consideration of Jeffreys's "mixed-race upbringing in Brooklyn, the civil-rights era, and the integrationist power of popular music." It included "Hail Hail Rock 'n' Roll," a tribute to black rock 'n' roll pioneers that reached No. 11 in Germany and broke into the UK Singles Chart.

On Wildlife Dictionary (1997, released only in Europe), Jeffreys shifted back to love and sex in songs like "Afrodiziak," "Love Jones," "Original Lust" and "Temptation." The album featured a polished production with a 1970s soul influence in its beats, grooves and riffs. One of the tracks, "Sexuality," was featured in an Armani ad campaign. After the birth of his daughter Savannah in 1997, Jeffreys took time off from recording to be a full-time father.

=== Solo career, 2000–19 ===
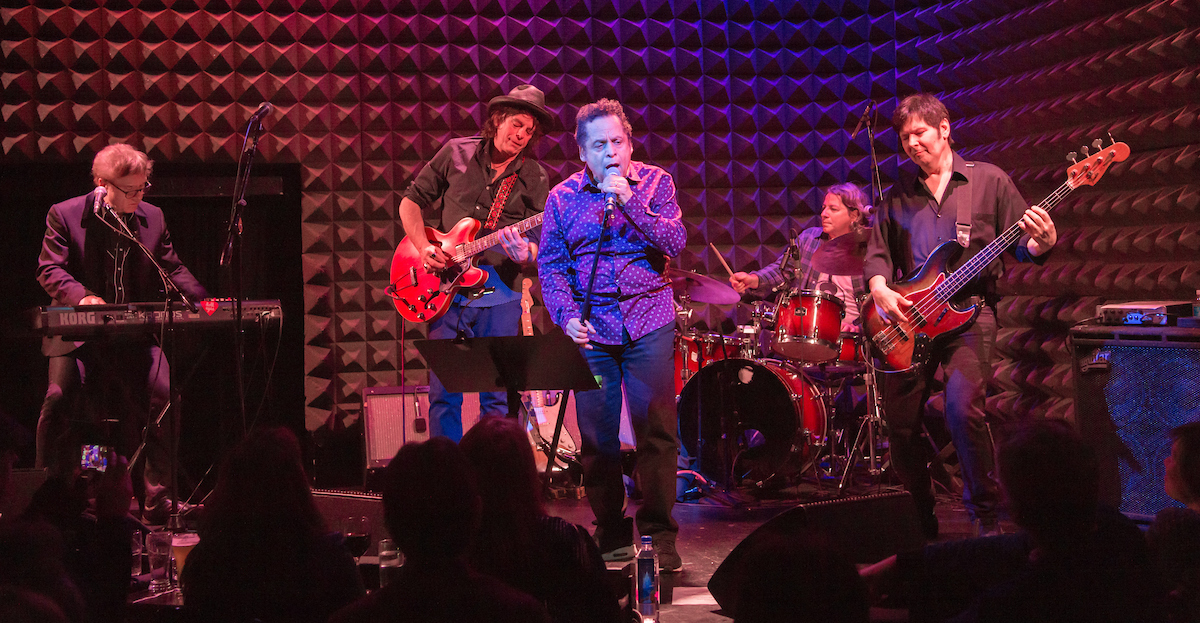
Garland Jeffreys in performance at Joe's Pub New York City, 2016

In the 2000s, Jeffreys staged occasional European and US tours, performed in various benefit concerts, and released four albums. I'm Alive (2007) was an 18-song retrospective spanning three decades and multiple genres throughout his career. It featured three new songs: "Return of the Matador," "Proud Highway" and the anthemic title track.

In 2011, Jeffreys formed his own label, Luna Park Records, and released The King of In Between. Widely regarded as on par with his best work, the album made "Best of" lists at NPR, Rolling Stone, as well as New York's WFUV, for the tracks "Coney Island Winter" and "Roller Coaster Town". Its songs paired serious, signature themes—New York City, autobiography and a new motif of mortality ("I'm Alive," "In God's Waiting Room")—with exuberant music ranging across roots rock, stripped-down soul, blues, and reggae/ska. David Fricke of Rolling Stone called it "a true comeback [whose] local geography and defiant vocal poise" recalled "the pavement pride and candor" of 1977's Ghost Writer. Noting songs like the funk-influenced "Streetwise," NPR's Ken Tucker called Jeffreys "a wary realist and an appreciator of the culture lurking amidst potential dangers," whose precisely observed songs made the "guitar-based, myth-making impulse work as intimate art."

In 2013, at age 70, Jeffreys released Truth Serum, a crowd-funded, ten-track set drawn from more than 50 songs that he wrote over the prior two years and recorded at home as demos on obsolete mini-cassette tapes. For the album, he put together a band including guitarist Larry Campbell, drummer Steve Jordan and keyboardist Brian Mitchell and recorded each song in one take. They center on struggles with temptation (the title song, "It's What I Am"), relationships ("Ship of Fools," "Colorblind Love"), the emotional pull of family ("Collide the Generations") and the desire for a better world ("Revolution of the Mind," "Is This the Real World"). Allmusic called the album introspective "like a set of journal entries" with an unusually straightforward and tight focus (for Jeffreys) on music rooted in bluesy, simple arrangements. American Songwriter deemed it "urgent and immediate … filled with seven decades of gritty, street-smart attitude."

Four years later, Jeffreys put out 14 Steps To Harlem (2017), which reviewers noted, still found him in supple voice and "reveling in eclecticism and wide-ranging songwriting." Musically, its songs moved from rocking anthems like "When You Call My Name" to rockabilly blues ("Schoolyard Blues"), R&B and doo-wop ("Venus") to reggae and a wrenching, creatively arranged cover of the John Lennon song "Help." In theme, the set returned to recurrent Jeffreys subjects: New York City, race and his past ("Colored Boy Said" and the title-track tribute to his parents' work ethic) and love ("Spanish Heart," "Venus"). The album includes a violin contribution by Laurie Anderson and singing from his daughter, Savannah, on "Time Goes Away."

Notable appearances in the 2000s include a performance at Bruce Springsteen's Asbury Park Christmas show (2001) and a rendition of "96 Tears" with Springsteen at the Pinkpop Festival in Holland (2012), among others. Jeffreys also covered the song "Philadelphia" for the charity CD Light of Day: A Tribute to Bruce Springsteen. He appeared in The Soul of a Man episode of Martin Scorsese's documentary film series The Blues (2003), which explored bluesmen Skip James, Blind Willie Johnson and J. B. Lenoir. He was featured as a character performing "96 Tears" in blackface in season one of the HBO period drama, The Deuce (2017).

In 2016, Jeffreys was inducted into the Long Island Music Hall of Fame. He announced his retirement from performing in 2019, opening for Little Steven and the Disciples of Soul at the Olympia in Montreal in his final concert in July 2019.

=== "Wild in the Streets" ===
The rock-and-roll anthem "Wild in the Streets" is perhaps Jeffreys's best known song. It received significant airplay and underground hit status on progressive FM radio stations upon its release in 1977 and has been covered numerous times. Jeffreys wrote the song after hearing about a horrific rape and murder of a preteen girl in the Bronx by two teenage boys. Dr. John played clavinet on the song and helped arrange it, with backing from guitarist David Spinozza, drummer Rick Marotta, the Brecker Brothers (horns) and singer David Peel.

A cover version of the song by The Circle Jerks that inverted the song's emotional tone was featured in the 1986 skateboarder film Thrashin' and became a theme song for the California skate community. Other covers were recorded by: British Lions, Chris Spedding, The Circle Jerks, Electric Frankenstein, Elliott Murphy, Hot Water Music, Hurriganes, Leæther Strip and Mott the Hoople. The song has been used in various media contexts, including episodes of the television shows Life on Mars and The Get Down, the video game Max Payne 3, and commercials for Vans sneakers and L'Oreal.

== 2023 documentary ==
In 2023, a documentary on Jeffreys's life, Garland Jeffreys: The King of In Between, premiered at the DOC NYC festival, where it won the event's audience award. Directed by Jeffreys's wife and manager, Claire Jeffreys, the eight-year project relates the ups and downs of a 50-year career over which commercial success never matched critical acclaim. The film shares its title with Jeffreys's 2011 album and references his genre-stretching, eclectic style and multiracial identity.

Rolling Stone critic Jim Farber describes the documentary as a story of perseverance with an emotional core centered on a "sense of missed opportunity." It features testimony from music critics Robert Christgau and David Hajdu, musicians Bruce Springsteen, Vernon Reid, Graham Parker, Alejandro Escovedo and Laurie Anderson, and friend and actor Harvey Keitel. Springsteen says of Jeffreys, "He's in the great singer-songwriter tradition of Dylan and Neil Young … one of the American greats."

== Personal life ==
Jeffreys married his wife Claire in 1989. They have one child, Savannah, a singer-songwriter and video producer. In 2018, Jeffreys began showing signs of dementia, a condition that has since progressed.

== Discography ==
=== Solo ===
- 1970: Grinder's Switch featuring Garland Jeffreys
- 1973: Garland Jeffreys
- 1977: Ghost Writer
- 1978: One-Eyed Jack
- 1979: American Boy & Girl
- 1981: Escape Artist
- 1981: Rock 'n' Roll Adult
- 1983: Guts For Love
- 1992: Don't Call Me Buckwheat
- 1992: Matador & More...
- 1997: Wildlife Dictionary
- 2007: I'm Alive
- 2011: The King of In Between
- 2013: Truth Serum
- 2017: 14 Steps To Harlem

=== Singles ===
Year	Single	Peak positions								Album
Year	Single	US	NED	BEL (FLA)	FRA	GER	AUT	SWI	UK	Album
1970	"And Don't Be Late"	—	—	—	—	—	—	—	—	Grinder's Switch
1973	"She Didn't Lie" (Note: First release on Atlantic 45-2948 with "Lon Chaney" b-side.)	—	—	—	—	—	—	—	—	Garland Jeffreys (Note: Second version included on One-Eyed Jack.)
1973	"Wild in the Streets" (Note: First release on Atlantic 45-2981 with "Lon Chaney" b-side.)	—	—	—	—	—	—	—	—	Non-album singles (Note: "Wild in the Streets" was included on Ghost Writer in 1977.)
1975	"The Disco Kid"	—	—	—	—	—	—	—	—	Non-album singles
1977	"Cool Down Boy" (Note: Extended version included on Rock & Roll Adult.)	—	—	—	—	—	—	—	—	Ghost Writer
1977	"Wild in the Streets" (Note: Second release on A&M 1934 with "Ghost Writer" b-side.)	—	—	—	—	—	—	—	—	Ghost Writer
1977	"35 Millimeter Dreams"	—	—	—	—	—	—	—	—	Ghost Writer
1978	"Reelin'" (Note: With Phoebe Snow.)	108	—	—	—	—	—	—	—	One-Eyed Jack
1978	"She Didn't Lie" (Note: Second release on A&M 2074 with "Scream in the Night" b-side.)	—	—	—	—	—	—	—	—	One-Eyed Jack
1979	"Livin' for Me"	—	—	—	—	—	—	—	—	American Boy & Girl
1979	"Matador"	—	4	1	—	2	2	6	—	American Boy & Girl
1979	"Bring Back the Love" (Note: Only released in The Netherlands.)	—	—	—	—	—	—	—	—	American Boy & Girl
1980	"Bound to Get Ahead Someday" (Note: Only released in Germany)	—	—	—	—	—	—	—	—	Garland Jeffreys
1981	"Modern Lovers"	—	—	—	—	—	—	—	—	Escape Artist
1981	"96 Tears"	66	—	—	—	—	—	—	—	Escape Artist
1981	"Christine"	—	—	—	—	—	—	—	—	Escape Artist
1981	"R.O.C.K."	—	—	—	—	—	—	—	—	Escape Artist
1981	"Wild in the Streets (Live)"	—	—	—	—	—	—	—	—	Rock & Roll Adult
1982	"Surrender" (Note: Released only in Japan and Italy.)	—	—	—	—	—	—	—	—	Guts For Love
1982	"What Does It Take (To Win Your Love)"	107	—	—	—	—	—	—	—	Guts For Love
1983	"El Salvador" (Note: Only released in Europe and Australia.)	—	—	—	—	—	—	—	—	Guts For Love
1991	"Hail Hail Rock 'n' Roll" (Note: Released in Europe as a 12" 4-song maxi-single.)	—	8	14	33	12	—	8	72	Don't Call Me Buckwheat
1991	"The Answer"	—	46	—	—	58	—	—	—	Don't Call Me Buckwheat
1991	"Welcome to the World"	—	72	—	—	—	—	—	—	Don't Call Me Buckwheat
1997	"Sexuality"	—	—	—	—	—	—	—	—	Wildlife Dictionary
1997	"Original Lust"	—	—	—	—	—	—	—	—	Wildlife Dictionary
"—" denotes releases that did not chart or were not released.

=== Appearances and contributions ===
- 1970 John Cale Vintage Violence (Columbia) (Note: Jeffreys wrote "Fairweather Friend".)
- 1976 Lou Reed Rock and Roll Heart (Arista) (Note: Jeffreys sang background vocals on "You Wear It So Well".)
- 1998 Diamond Cuts: Turning Two (Vol. II) (Hungry For Music) (Note: Jeffreys contributed his own "Color Line".)
- 2003 Johnny's Blues: A Tribute To Johnny Cash (Northern Blues) (Note: Jeffreys contributed his cover version of "I Walk the Line".)
- 2003 Light of Day Tribute To Bruce Springsteen (Schoolhouse Records) (Note: Jeffreys contributed his cover version of "Streets of Philadelphia".)
- 2003 Martin Scorsese Presents The Blues: The Soul Of A Man (Sony) (Note: Jeffreys contributed his cover version of "Washington DC Hospital Center Blues".)
- 2005 Elliott Murphy: Live Hot Point (Last Call Records) (Note: Jeffreys contributed his own "Ballad Of Me", "35 Millimeter Dreams" and "Wild In The Streets".)
- 2011 Occupy This Album: 99 Songs for the 99 Percent (Music for Occupy) (Note: Jeffreys contributed his own "Coney Island Winter".)

Discography notes
