= (What's So Funny 'Bout) Peace, Love, and Understanding =

1974 single by Brinsley Schwarz

Single by Brinsley Schwarz

from the album The New Favourites of... Brinsley Schwarz
- Released: 1974
- Recorded: April–May 1974
- Genre: Country rock
- Length: 3:34
- Label: United Artists
- Songwriter: Nick Lowe
- Producer: Dave Edmunds

Official audio
- "[What's so Funny 'Bout] Peace Love and Understanding" on YouTube

"(What's So Funny 'Bout) Peace, Love, and Understanding" is a 1974 song written by English singer/songwriter Nick Lowe. Initially released by Lowe with his band Brinsley Schwarz on their 1974 album The New Favourites of... Brinsley Schwarz, the song was released as a single and did not chart.

The song was most famously covered by Elvis Costello and the Attractions, who recorded a version of the song that was released as a B-side to Lowe's 1978 solo single "American Squirm". The cover saw great popularity and was later included on the American version of Costello's 1979 album Armed Forces.

== Brinsley Schwarz version ==
Nick Lowe had initially written the song while in the pub rock band Brinsley Schwarz. He has said that Judee Sill's "Jesus Was a Cross Maker" was an influence on the song. He explained the writing process, "I had the incredible foresight not to mess it up with any clever, stupid, clever lines. 'Just let the slightly clunky title do the work,' was the idea. The idea was all in the title. I had a good tune for it. And I let the title do the work. And that was amazing—I'm amazed nowadays, looking back, that I did that." Their version was produced by Dave Edmunds, whose production, according to Lowe, gave the track "a big full sound."

The song was originally released in 1974 on the album The New Favourites of... Brinsley Schwarz and released as a single; this version has been included in the following Lowe compilations: 2002's Anthology (along with the Elvis Costello version), 2009's Quiet Please... The New Best of Nick Lowe, 1991's Surrender to the Rhythm: The Best of Brinsley Schwarz, 1996's Naughty Rhythms: The Best of Pub Rock 1970–1976, and 1998's Pub Rock: Paving the Way for Punk. The song was a commercial failure; Lowe commented, "When the Brinsleys split up, that should've been the end of it. That's what happens to bands' songs when they split up, the songs go in the dustbin of history. The song was never a hit, it never caused much of a stir at all when we did it originally."

Lowe has not released a solo studio version of the song, but plays it regularly in concert, and live versions have appeared as B-sides of his 1982 double single "My Heart Hurts", and his 1994 EP True Love Travels on a Gravel Road, on the radio compilations KGSR Broadcasts Vol. 3, Q107's Concerts in the Sky: the Campfire Versions, and Live at the World Cafe 10th Anniversary, some with solo acoustic guitar and some with different full bands. Another live Lowe version appears on his 2004 live album Untouched Takeaway, and a live Brinsley Schwarz version is included on What IS so Funny About Peace Love and Understanding?, which featured songs played live in BBC sessions. Lowe also produced a cover version of the song as a B-side for the 1991 single "See Saw" by the British band Katydids from their album Shangri-la, after producing their eponymous debut album the year before.

=== Personnel ===
- Brinsley Schwarz – guitar, vocals
- Ian Gomm – guitars, vocals
- Billy Rankin – drums
- Bob Andrews – keyboards, vocals
- Nick Lowe – bass guitar, acoustic guitar, vocals

== Elvis Costello & the Attractions version ==
"(What's So Funny 'Bout) Peace, Love, and Understanding"
- The rear single artwork for "American Squirm"

Single by Elvis Costello and the Attractions (Note: Costello and the Attractions' cover appeared as the B-side to Nick Lowe's single "American Squirm", where they were credited as "Nick Lowe and His Sound".)

from the album Armed Forces (Note: US Version and 1993 reissue only)
- A-side: "American Squirm"
- Released: November 1978
- Genre: New wave; power pop
- Length: 3:31
- Label: Radar
- Producer: Nick Lowe

Elvis Costello and the Attractions (Note: Costello and the Attractions' cover appeared as the B-side to Nick Lowe's single "American Squirm", where they were credited as "Nick Lowe and His Sound".) singles chronology
"Radio, Radio" (1978)	"(What's So Funny 'Bout) Peace, Love, and Understanding" (1978)	"Oliver's Army" (1979)

In 1978, Elvis Costello and the Attractions recorded a cover of "(What's So Funny 'Bout) Peace, Love, and Understanding" for the B-side of Nick Lowe's 1978 single "American Squirm", a version credited to "Nick Lowe and His Sound". This version, produced by Lowe, was appended to the US release of Costello's 1979 album Armed Forces and has since usurped the original in popularity to become one of Costello's signature songs.

=== Background ===
Costello and the Attractions recorded their version of "(What's So Funny 'Bout) Peace, Love, and Understanding" during their sessions for Costello's third album, Armed Forces. At the time Lowe was Costello's producer, and produced this track as well. Lowe recalled of the process:

It was [Costello's] idea. I produced his records back then. ... He was a fan of a band I was in before Rockpile, called Brinsley Schwarz. He used to come see us play. 'Peace Love and Understanding' was a Brinsley Schwarz song. ... But it was he who really popularized that song. It's been covered by loads of people, and it would've disappeared if it wasn't for him.

Costello in his autobiography contended that Brinsley Schwarz's original "had originally seemed almost tongue-in-cheek, a take on that brief period after flower power when Tin Pan Alley staff songwriters seemed to say 'Hey, let's get in on some of this crazy 'peace' and 'love' stuff that the kids are digging today'." He then characterized his cover with the Attractions as "not quite so genial".

=== Release ===
Costello's version was first released on Lowe's "American Squirm" single in 1978. Though credited to "Nick Lowe and His Sound", the single artwork alluded to Costello's involvement. Costello explained, "I do recall that Nick was pictured on the sleeve wearing a pair of my dark hornrims, clutching my Jazzmaster, with the name 'Costello' inlaid on the neck. I think it was what you might call a clue." When the song became a hit, it was quickly appended as the last track to the US edition of Costello's album Armed Forces. At the insistence of Columbia Records, it replaced "Sunday's Best", which the label considered "too English". Though never released as an A-side to a commercial single, the song did appear as the A-side to a limited edition single given away at a 1979 Valentine's Day concert in Long Beach, California.

The video for the song, directed by Chuck Statler, was filmed in Vancouver in November 1978, while Costello and his band were in the city to perform at Pacific Coliseum. The video was filmed illegally after hours in Stanley Park. It opens on a shot of the band on a beach with Burrard Inlet and North Vancouver in the background, and features a number of shots filmed at the park's totem pole pavilion.

It has appeared on several Costello greatest hits compilations over the years, as well as on the soundtrack to the film 200 Cigarettes. Live versions appeared on Rock and Roll Hall of Fame, Volume 7: 2002–2003, and 2012's The Return of the Spectacular Spinning Songbook, both by Elvis Costello and the Imposters.

=== Critical reception ===
Since its release, Costello's cover of "(What's So Funny 'Bout) Peace, Love, and Understanding" has attracted critical acclaim. Janet Maslin of Rolling Stone praised how the song "is delivered with a sincerity bordering on desperation." AllMusic wrote, "Costello and his band tore into the song with a passionate ferocity that was rare even for one of the most solid and hard-driving pop acts of their day. If the original was a farewell hymn, in Costello's hands '(What's So Funny 'Bout) Peace, Love, and Understanding; became a wake-up call, and no one who heard it could escape the urgency of its message. The song became something of an anthem after Costello popularized it." PopMatters stated, "While it was possibly intended as ironic when it originally dripped from Lowe's pen, the Attractions baptize it by fire and issue forth the ultimate punk anthem. ... It's simple, direct, forceful as all hell, and remains the most memorable song within Armed Forces' esteemed track list."

Modern Drummer said of drummer Pete Thomas' performance, "A beautiful thing happens on this song, common to many early Attractions songs. It's that feeling that the track could derail, when in reality Thomas has everything locked down. He does a lot of playing here without overplaying. Like most Attractions songs from that era, this was cut live, full-band and lead vocal. That's probably why so many years later, it still sounds so energized and inspired."

"(What's So Funny 'Bout) Peace, Love, and Understanding" has appeared on several lists of the greatest Elvis Costello songs, including ones compiled by The London Telegraph and uDiscoverMusic. In 2004, Rolling Stone magazine ranked this version of the song as the 284th-best song of all time. Additionally, Costello's version has appeared on several lists of the best covers of all time; in one such list, Paste Magazine concluded, "Its greatest triumph, however, rests with its timelessness and continued relevance, as newer bands continue to cover this song, often citing Costello's version as the source of inspiration."

=== Personnel ===
- Elvis Costello – guitar, vocals
- Steve Nieve – organ, synthesizer
- Bruce Thomas – bass
- Pete Thomas – drums

== Other recordings and performances ==
A version of the song was included on the soundtrack album for the 1992 film The Bodyguard, which sold 17 million copies in the United States alone. This version was performed by jazz singer Curtis Stigers (who also used it as a B-side to the single "Sleeping with the Lights On" from his eponymous debut album, which had been released the previous year) and produced by Danny Kortchmar. According to Will Birch's book on pub rock, No Sleep Till Canvey Island, the cover royalties from Stigers' version of the song made Lowe wealthy. Lowe, however, asserts that he used most of the money to support a subsequent tour with full band. Stigers later covered a second Lowe song, "You Inspire Me" from his 1998 album Dig My Mood, on the 2003 album of the same name.

John Lennon quoted the song in his 1980 Rolling Stone interview with Jonathan Cott.

A karaoke version of the song, sung by Bill Murray's character Bob Harris, is included in the 2003 film Lost in Translation. However, it was not included in the film's soundtrack.

In 2004, "(What's So Funny 'bout) Peace, Love and Understanding" was regularly performed as an all-star jam on the Vote for Change tour, which featured a rotating cast of headliners. The 11 October concert at the MCI Center in Washington, D.C. was broadcast live on the Sundance Channel and on radio. This version of the song featured Bruce Springsteen and the E Street Band, the Dixie Chicks, Eddie Vedder, Dave Matthews, and John Fogerty with Michael Stipe, Bonnie Raitt, Keb' Mo', and Jackson Browne.

In 2008, it was also used as a group number, at the close of the 2008 Comedy Central special A Colbert Christmas: The Greatest Gift of All!, sung by Stephen Colbert, Elvis Costello, Willie Nelson, Toby Keith, John Legend, and Feist. This performance was included on the album, which won the 2010 Grammy Award for Best Comedy Album at the 52nd Annual Grammy Awards.

In response to the Pittsburgh synagogue shooting on 27 October 2018, at Tree of Life, Pittsburgh, Pennsylvania-based band The Clarks released a cover of the song, with all proceeds going to the Tree of Life synagogue and was included on their 2019 compilation album Between Now and Then Vol. 2.

A melancholic rendition of the song was prominently featured in an episode of the final season of the surrealist superhero television series Legion. This version is performed by Legion showrunner Noah Hawley and arranged by composer Jeff Russo, which is sung over diegetically in the episode by the series' main characters in the aftermath of a violent struggle. Hawley and Russo's rendition was included on the season's soundtrack album, Legion: Finalmente, without the voices of the cast.

In May 2020, during the COVID-19 pandemic, Sharon Van Etten and Queens of the Stone Age's Josh Homme released a cover of the song accompanied by an official video which was shot at the artists' respective homes. "We wanted to share something personal and universal. That we are all in this time together", Van Etten wrote about the cover. The Pretty Reckless released an acoustic version on their 2022 EP Other Worlds, and Cheekface released a cover in 2023.

== Mural ==
In 2024-2025, a new nine-panel mural celebrating immigrants in the narthex of St. Patrick's Cathedral in New York City, was unveiled taking as its title What's So Funny About Peace, Love, and Understanding a slight variation on the name of the song.
