= Colin Bass =

English musician (born 1951)

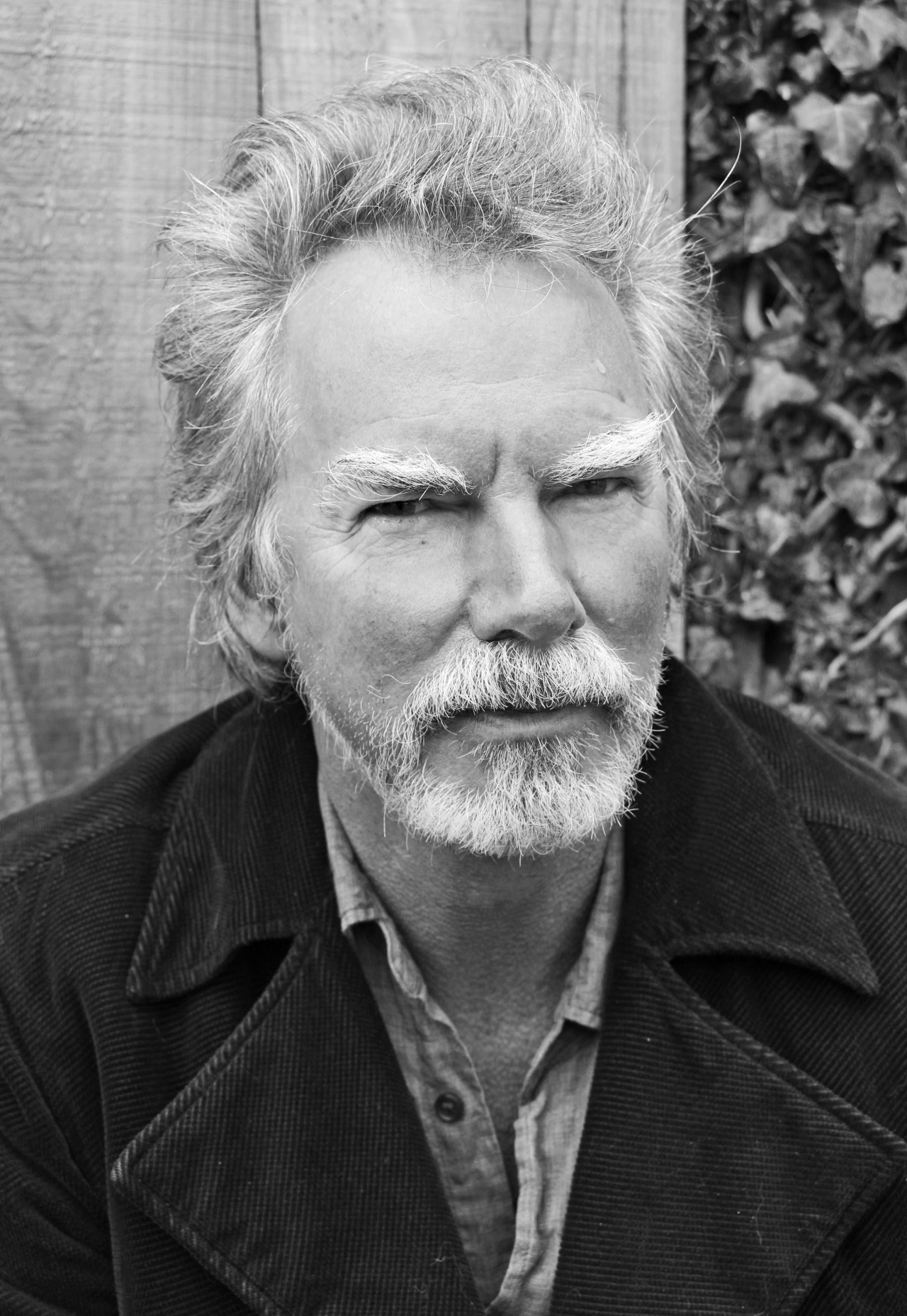
- Bass in 2015

Background information
- Born: 4 May 1951 (age 75); London, England
- Genres: Progressive rock, pop rock, world music
- Instruments: Vocals, bass, guitar
- Years active: 1968–present
- Labels: Kartini Music, Spark
- Website: colinbass.com

Colin Bass (born 4 May 1951) is an English musician, singer, songwriter and record producer. Since 1979, he has been a member of the British progressive rock band Camel, who, after a ten-year hiatus due to the ill health of bandleader Andrew Latimer, returned to active touring in 2013. From 1984 to 1992, he was also a core figure in the pioneering world music group 3 Mustaphas 3. He has also made two solo albums under his own name and three albums recorded in Indonesia under the name Sabah Habas Mustapha. The title track of the first, "Denpasar Moon", became a hugely popular song in Indonesia in the mid-1990s and has been covered by over 50 Indonesian, Malaysian, Japanese and Filipino artists. As a record producer he has worked with a diverse range of international artists including: the Klezmatics (USA), SambaSunda (Indonesia), Daniel Kahn & the Painted Bird (USA) Krar Collective (Ethiopia), Etran Finatawa (Niger) and 9Bach (Wales) amongst others. As a guest artist he has appeared on albums by a number of artists including Malian singing star Oumou Sangare, playing on all tracks of her 1993 Ko Sira album.

== Biography ==
=== Early life and career ===
Bass was born in London and first started playing professionally in 1968 as guitarist with a band called the Krisis, playing the UK club and ballroom circuit, after which he switched to bass guitar and joined Velvet Opera in 1970 with whom he made his first recordings for Spark Records.

=== 1970s ===
In 1971, he joined an incarnation of the 1960s group the Foundations and spent a year playing the cabaret clubs mostly in northern England.

In 1971, he met Ernie Graham, formerly of Eire Apparent and, together with guitarist Jonathan Glemser, they formed the band Clancy. The band became part of London's growing Pub-Rock scene and briefly signed with Island Records but were dropped after differences with producer Muff Winwood.

Shortly afterwards, the band signed with Warner Brothers and recorded two albums: Seriously Speaking (1974) and Every Day (1975). The line-up on both was: Bass (bass, vocals), Ernie Graham (guitar, vocals), Gasper Lawal (percussion), Dave Vasco (guitar), Dave Skinner (keyboards, vocals) and Barry Ford (drums, vocals).

Clancy split in 1976 and Bass joined Steve Hillage, who was putting together a band to promote the album L on a six-month tour of Europe and the USA. The line-up included ex-Jethro Tull drummer Clive Bunker.

In 1977, Bass was invited by American saxophonist and composer Jim Cuomo, who had occasionally played with Clancy, to participate in his musical Woe Babylon at the Edinburgh Festival. The band from the show included pianist Ollie Marland and drummer Miguel Olivares and this quartet became a project known as the Casual Band. Olivares was later replaced by ex-Back Door drummer Tony Hicks. Recordings were made with producer Tom Newman but were never released.

In 1979, Steve Hillage tour manager Laurie Small introduced Bass to British progressive-rock band Camel. The line-up at the time was Andrew Latimer (guitar, vocals), Andy Ward (drums) and keyboardists Kit Watkins (ex-Happy The Man) and Jan Schelhaas (ex-Caravan). There followed two albums I Can See Your House From Here (1979) and Nude (1980) and respective international tours.

=== 1980s ===
In 1981 at the end of the "Nude" tour, Andy Ward's health problems led to Andrew Latimer's dissolving of the band. Bass relocated to Paris where he recorded an album and performed live with old colleague Jim Cuomo.

Returning to the UK in 1983 he took up a teaching post, played sessions and club and pub gigs with various line-ups until Andrew Latimer invited him to rejoin Camel for the 1984 "Stationary Traveller" tour. In the same year he started to play with the Anglo-Ghanaian band Orchestra Jazira, which led to his induction in the pioneer world-music group 3 Mustaphas 3, who renamed him as Sabah Habas Mustapha.

Between 1985 and 1991, the 3 Mustaphas 3 recorded four full albums and sundry singles and EPs and established a cult following for their live performances, touring in the USA, Europe, Japan and also in the then Eastern Bloc countries of East Germany, Hungary and Bulgaria.

=== 1990s ===
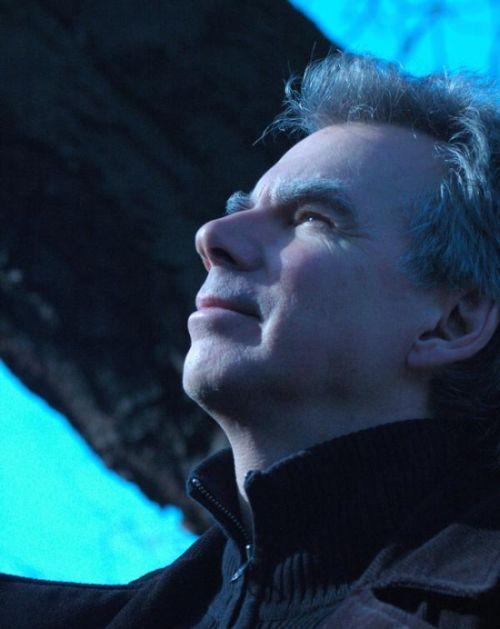
Colin Bass Portrait by Jarno Wildner

When the 3 Mustaphas 3 stopped activities in 1991, Bass went to Indonesia where, over the next ten years, he recorded three solo albums with Indonesian musicians under the name of Sabah Habas Mustapha. The first, Denpasar Moon (1994), was recorded in Jakarta and explored the sounds of the popular music style dangdut.

The title song, "Denpasar Moon", first released in 1993, became a major hit in Indonesia in the form of a cover version by a singer from the Philippines called Maribeth and was subsequently recorded by over 50 different Indonesian artists and also artists from Malaysia and Japan.

In 1997, Bass founded the Kartini Music record label whose first release was another Sabah Habas Mustapha record, Jalan Kopo, recorded in Bandung, Indonesia, and this time influenced by the sounds of the west Javanese province of Sunda. The title cut from that record is played as pre-show music for the nighttime fireworks/water spectacular IllumiNations: Reflections of Earth at Epcot, located in Walt Disney World in Orlando, Florida.

At the same time, the 1990s saw a rejuvenated Camel back on the scene after a long period of inactivity due to a protracted legal dispute with previous management.

In 1991, Andrew Latimer, now relocated to California, invited Colin to participate in the recording of "Dust and Dreams", the first release by his own label Camel Productions, which was followed by a world tour in 1992 with the line-up of Latimer, Bass and Mickey Simmonds (keyboards) and Paul Burgess (drums).

Between then and 2003, Camel released another three studio albums and undertook subsequent tours all documented with live albums and DVDs.

In 1998, Kartini Music released Bass' first album under the name Colin Bass: An Outcast of the Islands. Recorded in Poland and California and featuring Andrew Latimer on guitar, the then Camel drummer Dave Stewart and a number of Polish musicians, the album gathered critical praise and helped establish his reputation in Poland. Subsequent tours produced two live albums: Live at Polskie Radio 3 (1999) and Live Vol.2: Acoustic Songs (2000).

=== 2000s ===
2000 also saw the release of another Sabah Habas Mustapha album recorded in Bandung: So La Li. It further explored the sounds of the Sundanese region and featured again the multi-instrumentalist Ismet Ruchimat and several musicians from his group SambaSunda. So La Li won wide critical acclaim and was nominated for a BBC Radio 3 World Music Award.

Bass lived in Berlin, Germany from 1988 to 2011. From 1994 until the end of 2008, he wrote and presented a weekly radio show for RBB Radio Multikulti and WDR Funkhaus Europa in Germany: "Sabah am Sonntag", presenting musical rarities and curiosities from around the world.

=== 2010s ===
In 2012, Bass moved to North Wales, and set up Wild End Studio.

In 2013, he travelled to Niger to produce an album for Etran Finatawa, recorded in a tent in the Sahara desert. That same year Camel returned to the stage with a European tour and a live DVD recorded at their concert at the London Barbican.

In 2014, Bass co-produced the album Tincian by Welsh band 9Bach with post-production and mixing completed at Wild End Studios. Camel embarked on part 2 of the 'Snow Goose' European Tour.

2015 saw another Camel European Tour and 9Bach winning the 'Best Album' category at the BBC Radio 2 Folk Awards for Tincian.

== Discography ==
=== Solo ===
- 1998: An Outcast of the Islands
- 1998: As Far as I Can See EP
- 1999: Denpasar Moon EP
- 1999: Live at Polskie Radio 3 2 CD
- 1999: Poznań Pie – Live in Concert VHS
- 2000: Live Vol. 2 – Acoustic Songs
- 2002: Gently Kindly
- 2003: In the Meantime
- 2003: An Outcast of the Islands – Remastered + 3 bonus tracks
- 2005: Planetarium – With Józef Skrzek
- 2006: In the Meantime – Remastered + 5 bonus tracks
- 2012: An Outcast of the Islands - Reissue
- 2015: At Wild End
- 2020: Still - with Daniel Biro
- 2024: More - with Daniel Biro

=== Albums by other artists produced by Colin Bass ===
- 1989: Chisi by Stella Chiweshe (Piranha)
- 2005: Rahwana's Cry by SambaSunda (Network Medien)
- 2010: Tarkat Tajje / Let's Go! by Etran Finatawa (Riverboat/WMN)
- 2010: Lost Causes by Daniel Kahn & the Painted Bird (Oriente)
- 2011: Java by SambaSunda Quintet (Riverboat/WMN)
- 2012: Ethiopia Super Krar by Krar Collective (Riverboat/WMN)
- 2012: Go Calypsonian by Lord Mouse and the Kalypso Katz (Piranha Music)
- 2012: Anewala - Walking Man by Alhousseini Anivolla (Riverboat/WMN)
- 2013: The Sahara Sessions by Etran Finatawa (Riverboat/WMN)
- 2014: Tincian by 9Bach (Real World Records)

=== As Sabah Habas Mustapha ===
- 1994: Denpasar Moon
- 1998: Jalan Kopo
- 1999: So La Li
- 2004: Denpasar Moon 2004 – remastered + bonus

=== With Camel ===
- 1979: I Can See Your House from Here
- 1981: Nude
- 1984: Pressure Points: Live in Concert (live, 11 May 1984, Hammersmith Odeon, London, UK)
- 1991: Dust and Dreams
- 1993: Never Let Go (1993) (live, 5 September 1992, Enschede, Netherlands) 2 CD
- 1996: Harbour of Tears
- 1997: On the Road 1981 (1997) (live, BBC radio, 2 April 1981, Hammersmith Odeon, London, UK)
- 1998: Coming of Age (1998) (live, 13 March 1997, Billboard, Los Angeles, USA) – Live CD and DVD
- 1999: Rajaz
- 2001: The Paris Collection (2001) (live, 30 September 2000, Bataclan-Club, Paris, France) Note: CD wrongly states concert as 30 October
- 2002: A Nod and a Wink
- 2013: The Snow Goose (new re-recorded version)

=== With 3 Mustaphas 3 ===
- 1986: Orchestra BAM de Grand Mustapha International and (Jolly) Party – Local Music
- 1987: Shopping
- 1990: Soup of the Century
- 1991: Friends, Fiends & Fronds
- 2001: Play Musty for Me
