= Once in a Blue Moon (Frankie Miller album) =

Studio album by Frankie Miller
- Released: 1973
- Recorded: 1972
- Studio: Rockfield, Wales
- Length: 32:15; 42:18 (remastered)
- Label: Chrysalis
- Producer: Dave Robinson

Frankie Miller chronology
Once in a Blue Moon (1973)	High Life (1974)

Once in a Blue Moon is the debut solo album by Frankie Miller. He used Brinsley Schwarz as his backing band.

== Critical reception ==
Professional ratings
Review scores
Source	Rating
AllMusic	4/5 stars
The Encyclopedia of Popular Music	3/5 stars
The Great Rock Discography	6/10
The New Rolling Stone Record Guide	3/5 stars

The Western Daily Press called the album "superb black gravel blues". The Evening Post said that Miller has "a rich, bluesy voice and sings with conviction and effect." The Guardian Journal opined that "his songs are at once introspective and illuminating".

== Track listing ==
All tracks composed by Frankie Miller; except where indicated

Side one
No.	Title	Length
1.	"You Dont Need to Laugh (To Be Happy)"	3:32
2.	"I Can't Change It"	3:11
3.	"Candlelight Sonata in F Major"	2:35
4.	"Ann Eliza Jane"	3:05
5.	"It's All Over"	2:39

Side two
No.	Title	Writer(s)	Length
1.	"In No Resistance"		3:02
2.	"After All (I Live My Life)"	Jim Doris, Frankie Miller	3:43
3.	"Just Like Tom Thumb's Blues"	Bob Dylan	4:04
4.	"Mail Box"		3:15
5.	"I'm Ready"	Willie Dixon	3:10

2003 CD bonus tracks
No.	Title	Length
11.	"I Can See the Train" (demo)	2:25
12.	"Blow My Whistle" (demo)	2:28
13.	"The Rules of the Game" (demo)	2:05
14.	"And It's Raining"	3:04

== Personnel ==
- Frankie Miller - vocals, acoustic guitar, harmonica
- Bob Andrews - grand piano, junk piano, accordion, backing vocals
- Brinsley Schwarz - lead & acoustic guitars
- Ian Gomm - lead & acoustic guitars
- Nick Lowe - electric bass, double bass, backing vocals
- Billy Rankin - drums
- Bridgit, Joy and Janice - backing vocals

Production

- Recorded at Rockfield Studios
- Engineered by Kingsley Ward, Ralph Downs
- Produced by Dave Robinson
