= Clancy (band) =

British rock group

- Origin: United Kingdom
- Genres: Pub rock
- Years active: 1973–1976
- Labels: Warner Bros. Records
- Members: Colin Bass; Ernie Graham; Jonathan "Jojo" Glemser; David Skinner; Gasper Lawal; Barry Ford

Clancy were a British rock group, prominent in the pub rock scene of the early 1970s. They issued two albums on Warner Bros. Records, but did not achieve chart success.

== History ==
In mid-1973, Ian Gomm of Brinsley Schwarz introduced Colin Bass (of the Foundations and Velvet Opera) who Gomm had played with in the Daisy Showband, to Ernie Graham (of Eire Apparent and Help Yourself) and Jonathan "Jojo" Glemser (also of Help Yourself) who Gomm had played with on the Downhome Rhythm Kings tour. Together with drummer Steve Brendell (ex-Matchbox) and Dave Vasco (also formerly of the Foundations), they formed Clancy, who became part of London's growing pub rock scene. They briefly signed with Island Records, but were dropped after differences with producer Muff Winwood.

In late 1973, first Brendell and then Glemser left, being replaced by George Butler and Dave Skinner (formerly with Uncle Dog). When Butler left, he was replaced by drummer Barry Ford and percussionist Gaspar Lawal. The line up then stabilised, and Clancy signed with Warner Bros. Records for whom they release two albums Seriously Speaking in 1974 and Every Day in 1975. Neither album achieved chart success and Clancy split in 1976.

== Personnel ==
- Colin Bass (bass, vocals)
- Jonathan "Jojo" Glemser (guitar, vocals)
- Ernie Graham (guitar, vocals)
- Gasper Lawal (percussion)
- Dave Vasco (guitar)
- David Skinner (keyboards, vocals)
- Barry Ford (drums, vocals)
- Jim Cuomo (sax)
- Sam Mitchell guested on dobro on Every Day

== Discography ==
=== Albums ===
- Seriously Speaking (1974) Warner Brothers (1975 in US) – Re-released on CD (2004) Vivid
- Every Day (1975) Warner – Re-released on CD (2004) Vivid

=== Singles ===
- "Back on Love" / "Steal Away" (1974) Warner
- "Baby Don't You Do It" / "Everything's Gonna Be Fine" (1975) Warner
- "Good Judgement" / "Leavin' Town" (1975) Warner
- "You Have Made My Life So Sweet" /" Stealaway" (1978) Warner
