= Billy Rankin (drummer) =

- Born: William Hector Rankin III; 23 March 1951 (age 75)
- Origin: England
- Occupation: Musician
- Instruments: Drums

William Hector Rankin III (born 23 March 1951) is an English rock drummer, active in the 1960s and 1970s.

He joined Kippington Lodge in 1968 and remained with them when they evolved into Brinsley Schwarz in 1969. He played on all Brinsley Schwarz's albums, and whilst with them, also drummed on albums for Ernie Graham, Chilli Willi and the Red Hot Peppers, Colin Scot and Frankie Miller.

After Brinsley Schwarz broke up in 1974, Rankin briefly joined Ducks Deluxe for their final tours, and played on their final album Last Night of a Pub Rock Band, recorded at London's 100 Club on 1 July 1975. He briefly joined Terraplane but did not record with them, and also appeared on two albums for Dave Edmunds. He joined Big Jim Sullivan's Tiger with whom he recorded two albums, before retiring from the music industry

In October 2007 Tyla, Belmont, Groome and Rankin reformed Ducks Deluxe, to celebrate the 35th anniversary of their formation, and performed at the 100 Club, the venue of their final performance in 1975.

== Discography ==
With Brinsley Schwarz

- Brinsley Schwarz
- Despite It All
- Nervous on the Road
- Silver Pistol
- Please Don't Ever Change
- Original Golden Greats
- Unknown Numbers (bootleg)
- What IS So Funny About Peace Love & Understanding?
- Cruel to Be Kind
- The New Favourites of... Brinsley Schwarz

With Chilli Willi and the Red Hot Peppers

- Kings of the Robot Rhythm

With Colin Scot

- Colin Scot

With Dave Edmunds

- Subtle as a Flying Mallet
- Get It

With Ducks Deluxe

- Last Night of a Pub Rock Band

With Ernie Graham

- Ernie Graham

With Frankie Miller

- Once in a Blue Moon

With Nick Lowe

- Jesus of Cool (Bonus tracks only)
- Quiet Please... The New Best of Nick Lowe

With Big Jim Sullivan's Tiger

- Tiger
- Going Down Laughing
