= Subtle as a Flying Mallet =

Studio album by Dave Edmunds
- Released: April 1975
- Recorded: Rockfield, Wales (tracks 6 and 12 recorded live in Cardiff)
- Genre: Rock and roll
- Length: 37:20
- Label: RCA
- Producer: Dave Edmunds

Dave Edmunds chronology
Rockpile (1972)	Subtle as a Flying Mallet (1975)	Get It (1977)

Professional ratings
Review scores
Source	Rating
AllMusic	3.5/5 stars
Christgau's Record Guide	B

Subtle as a Flying Mallet is the second solo album by Dave Edmunds, principally focused on sound-alike remakes of late 1950s and early 1960s hits. All of the vocals (except on the live tracks) are by Edmunds, and many of the songs are true solo efforts in that Edmunds also plays all the instruments. The album produced two Top 10 singles in the UK, remakes of the Phil Spector hit "Baby, I Love You" and the Chordettes' "Born to Be with You". A 2006 reissue of the album includes two former B-sides as bonus tracks.

The album was also rereleased in February 2013 by Rpm Records UK as a deluxe edition.

== Track listing ==
=== Subtle as a Flying Mallet ===
1. "Baby, I Love You" (Phil Spector, Ellie Greenwich, Jeff Barry) - 3:33
2. "Leave My Woman Alone" (Ray Charles) - 2:39
3. "Maybe" (Richard Barrett) - 2:55
4. "Da Doo Ron Ron" (Spector, Greenwich, Barry) - 2:22
5. "Let It Be Me" (Gilbert Bécaud, Mann Curtis, Pierre Delanoë) - 2:47
6. "No Money Down" (live) (Chuck Berry) - 3:52
7. "A Shot of Rhythm and Blues" (Terry Thompson) - 2:44
8. "Billy the Kid" (arranged by Dave Edmunds) - 3:36
9. "Born to Be with You" (Don Robertson) - 3:33
10. "She's My Baby" (Nick Lowe) - 3:38
11. "I Ain't Never" (Mel Tillis, Webb Pierce) - 3:16
12. "Let It Rock" (live) (Berry) - 3:01

=== Bonus Tracks (2006 reissue) ===
1. "Pick Axe Rag" (Edmunds, Mickey Gee) - 2:56
2. "Some Other Guy" (Richard Barrett, Jerry Leiber, Mike Stoller) - 2:25

=== Subtle as a Flying Mallet February 2013 deluxe edition. Rpm Records UK ===
1. "Baby, I Love You"
2. "Leave My Woman Alone"
3. "Maybe"
4. "Da Doo Ron Ron"
5. "Let It Be Me"
6. "No Money Down"
7. "Shot of Rhythm and Blues"
8. "Billy the Kid"
9. "Born to Be with You"
10. "She's My Baby"
11. "I Ain't Never"
12. "Let It Rock"
13. "Some Other Guy"
14. "When Will I Be Loved"
15. "Make Me Good"
16. "You Kept Me Waiting"
17. "C'mon Little Dixie"
18. "Need a Shot of Rhythm & Blues" (Alt. VSN)
19. "Da Doo Ron Ron" (Dave Edmunds & the Electricians)
20. "Pick Axe Rag" (Instrumental)

== Personnel ==
- Dave Edmunds - vocals, all guitars, bass, keyboards, drums
- Nick Lowe - bass
- Pick Withers - drums
- Bob Andrews - piano
- Brinsley Schwarz - backing band on "Let It Rock" and "No Money Down" (live in Cardiff)
  - Bob Andrews - piano
  - Ian Gomm - guitar, vocals
  - Nick Lowe - bass
  - Billy Rankin - drums
  - Brinsley Schwarz - guitar
- Album cover design by Hipgnosis
- Logotype and Lettering by Richard Evans
