= Dave Robinson (music executive) =

Irish music executive and video director

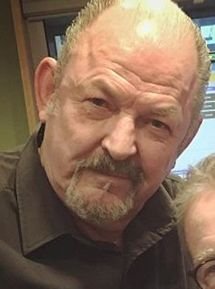
- Born: 14 May 1944 (age 82); Drumcondra, Dublin, Ireland
- Other name: Robbo
- Citizenship: Ireland
- Occupations: Music executive, music video director, record producer, music manager, photographer
- Known for: Co-founder of Stiff Records

David Robinson (born 14 May 1944), nicknamed Robbo, is an Irish music executive, music video director, record producer, music manager, and photographer. He is best known as the co-founder with Jake Riviera of Stiff Records where he signed up The Damned, Tracey Ullman, Kirsty MacColl, The Pogues, and Madness. He had also managed Elvis Costello, Nick Lowe, Dave Edmunds and Ian Dury before signing them up to Stiff.

== Early life ==
Robinson was born in Drumcondra, Dublin. He left Ireland while he was still a teenager and was hired as a photographer at Butlins Bognor Regis. From there he had jobs in London. He started with Rave magazine, where he was a photographer. He took photographs of The Beatles in The Cavern Club in Liverpool and then went on to photograph The Rolling Stones as the official photographer for their first tour of Ireland in 1965.

Robinson went on to manage Irish band Eire Apparent on a tour bill that included The Nice, The Move, Pink Floyd, Amen Corner and the Jimi Hendrix Experience. He went on to become a tour manager for Jimi Hendrix from his first tour of the UK until just before his death. He also managed The Animals, The Young Rascals and Vanilla Fudge. He also then went on to manage Van Morrison, Graham Parker, Nick Lowe, Dave Edmunds, Ian Dury and Elvis Costello, amongst others. Robinson also built a makeshift eight-track recording studio in the downstairs of the Hope and Anchor, Islington, and he created a network of 35 pubs in London where bands could play what they liked.

== Stiff Records and beyond ==
Robinson co-founded Stiff Records in August 1976 with his business partner Jake Riviera, with a £400 loan from the Dr. Feelgood lead singer Lee Brilleaux. He started as managing director, and started signing up The Damned, Motörhead, Elvis Costello, Nick Lowe, Tracey Ullman, The Plasmatics, Jona Lewie, Ian Dury & The Blockheads, Kirsty MacColl, The Box Tops, The Adverts, Lene Lovich, The Pogues, and Madness, amongst others.

Stiff merged with Island Records between 1984 and 1985, with Robinson becoming President of the record company, while still head of Stiff. Later Robinson admitted that the merger was a mistake. He said "Island was in a bad financial state and I spent too much time worrying about his label and not enough about my own. I had a big hand in the success of Legend, the Bob Marley compilation; U2 went multi-platinum; and I had a lot to do with the marketing of Frankie Goes to Hollywood. (Chris) Blackwell (the founder of Island Records) kind of double-crossed me after I'd essentially saved his arse". Stiff again became an independent again after the demerger, however by 1986 Stiff had gone into liquidation and was sold to ZTT records for £300,000

By 2004, Robinson had established Shell Records to be able to release Best Laid Plans by Sandra McCracken. He was a director of the label for just 6 days, from 7 May 2004 until 12 May 2004.

In 2025, Robinson undertook two tours of Ukraine with the Carlisle band Hardwicke Circus, despite the ongoing Russian invasion.

== Discography ==
=== Record producer ===
Selected albums:

- Brinsley Schwarz – Brinsley Schwarz (1970)
- Brinsley Schwarz – Despite It All (1970)
- Brinsley Schwarz – Silver Pistol (1972)
- Brinsley Schwarz – Nervous on the Road (1972)
- Frankie Miller – Once in a Blue Moon (1973)
- Martin Belmont – The Guest List (2009)

== Filmography ==
=== Music video director ===
- Madness: One Step Beyond (1979)
- Madness: Bed and Breakfast Man (1979)
- Madness: Baggy Trousers (1980)
- Madness: Take It or Leave It (1981)
- The Belle Stars: The Clapping Song (1982)
- Robert Plant: Burning Down One Side (1982)
- Madness: Our House (1982)
- Madness: House of Fun (1982)
- Madness: Driving in My Car (1982)
- Madness: Cardiac Arrest (1982)
- Lene Lovich: It's You, Only You (Mein Schmerz) (1982)
- Madness: Tomorrow's (Just Another Day) (1983)
- Tracey Ullman: Breakaway (1983)
- Tracey Ullman: They Don't Know (1983)
- Robert Palmer: Pride (1983)

=== Feature film director ===
- Take It or Leave It, documentary/drama film about London ska-pop group Madness
