= The New Favourites of... Brinsley Schwarz =

Studio album by Brinsley Schwarz
- Released: 1974
- Recorded: April–May 1974
- Studio: Rockfield Studios, Wales
- Genre: Rock; Pub rock
- Length: 36:43
- Label: United Artists; 29641
- Producer: Dave Edmunds

Brinsley Schwarz chronology
Please Don't Ever Change (1973)	The New Favourites of... Brinsley Schwarz (1974)

Professional ratings
Review scores
Source	Rating
AllMusic	4.5/5 stars

The New Favourites of... Brinsley Schwarz is the final studio album by Brinsley Schwarz, released in 1974, produced by Dave Edmunds.

== Track listing ==
1. "(What's So Funny 'Bout) Peace, Love, and Understanding" (Lowe) – 3:34
2. "Ever Since You're Gone" (Lowe) – 4:08
3. "The Ugly Things" (Lowe) – 2:48
4. "I Got the Real Thing" (Gomm, Lowe) – 3:48
5. "The Look That's in Your Eye Tonight" (Lowe) – 4:14
6. "Now's the Time" (Allan Clarke, Graham Nash) - 2:06
7. "Small Town, Big City" (Lowe) – 4:31
8. "Tryin' to Live My Life Without You" (Eugene Williams) – 3:24
9. "I Like You, I Don't Love You" (Gomm, Lowe) – 3:27
10. "Down in the Dive" (Lowe, Schwarz) – 4:54

== Personnel ==
Brinsley Schwarz

- Brinsley Schwarz – guitar, alto and tenor saxophone, vocals
- Ian Gomm – guitars, vocals
- Billy Rankin – drums
- Bob Andrews – keyboards, alto saxophone, vocals
- Nick Lowe – bass guitar, acoustic guitar, vocals

Technical

- Pierre Tubbs – cover concept
- Paul May – design
- Bryce Attwell, Keith Morris – photography
