= Please Don't Ever Change =

Studio album by Brinsley Schwarz
- Released: October 1973
- Recorded: July 1973
- Genres: Rock; Pub rock
- Length: 36:35
- Label: United Artists
- Producers: Brinsley Schwarz; Vic Maile

Brinsley Schwarz chronology
| Nervous on the Road (1972) | Please Don't Ever Change (1973) | The New Favourites of... Brinsley Schwarz (1974) |

Professional ratings
Review scores
| Source | Rating |
|---|---|
| Allmusic | 4/5 stars |

Please Don't Ever Change is a pub rock album by Brinsley Schwarz, released in 1973, named after the featured Goffin/King song, also recorded by The Crickets and The Beatles.

== Track listing ==
All tracks composed by Nick Lowe; except where indicated

1. "Hooked on Love" (Ian Gomm) – 2:31
2. "Why Do We Hurt the One We Love" – 3:47
3. "I Worry ('Bout You Baby)" – 2:59
4. "Don't Ever Change" (Gerry Goffin, Carole King) – 3:48
5. "Home in My Hand" (Ronnie Self) – 5:28
6. "Play That Fast Thing (One More Time)" – 4:24
7. "I Won't Make It Without You" – 4:19
8. "Down in Mexico" – 3:48
9. "Speedoo" (Esther Navarro) – 2:41
10. "The Version (Hypocrite)" (Leroy Sibbles) – 2:46

== Personnel ==
Brinsley Schwarz

- Brinsley Schwarz - guitar, Alto saxophone, piano, vocals
- Ian Gomm - guitar, vocals
- Billy Rankin - drums
- Bob Andrews - piano, organ, vocals
- Nick Lowe - bass guitar, vocals

Technical

- Kingsley Ward, Len Foster, Vic Maile - engineers
- Waldo's Design - sleeve
