= Nervous on the Road =

Studio album by Brinsley Schwarz
- Released: September 1972
- Recorded: April–May 1972
- Studio: Rockfield Studios, Wales
- Genre: Rock; Pub rock
- Length: 39:16
- Label: United Artists; 5647
- Producer: Dave Robinson

Brinsley Schwarz chronology
| Silver Pistol (1972) | Nervous on the Road (1972) | Please Don't Ever Change (1973) |

Professional ratings
Review scores
| Source | Rating |
|---|---|
| Allmusic | 5/5 stars |
| Christgau's Record Guide | A− |

Nervous on the Road is a pub rock album by Brinsley Schwarz, released in 1972.

== Track listing ==
All tracks composed by Nick Lowe; except where indicated

1. "It's Been So Long" (Ian Gomm) – 2:07
2. "Happy Doing What We're Doing" (Lowe, Bob Andrews) – 4:43
3. "Surrender to the Rhythm" – 3:25
4. "Don't Lose Your Grip On Love" – 4:24
5. "Nervous On The Road (But Can't Stay At Home)" – 4:58
6. "Feel A Little Funky" – 5:09
7. "I Like It Like That" (Chris Kenner, Allen Toussaint) – 3:06
8. "Brand New You, Brand New Me" – 4:39
9. "Home In My Hand" (Ronnie Self) – 2:56
10. "Why, Why, Why, Why, Why" – 3:49

== Personnel ==
Brinsley Schwarz

- Brinsley Schwarz - guitar, alto and tenor saxophone, vocals
- Ian Gomm - guitars, vocals
- Billy Rankin - drums
- Bob Andrews - keyboards, alto saxophone, vocals
- Nick Lowe - bass guitar, acoustic guitar, vocals

Technical

- Ralph Down, Kingsley "Magic Fingers" Ward - engineers
- Jet Power - cover
