= Silver Pistol =

Studio album by Brinsley Schwarz
- Released: February 1972
- Recorded: August 1971
- Genre: Rock; Pub rock Country rock
- Length: 41:12
- Label: United Artists
- Producer: Dave Robinson

Brinsley Schwarz chronology
| Despite It All (1970) | Silver Pistol (1972) | Nervous on the Road (1972) |

Professional ratings
Review scores
| Source | Rating |
|---|---|
| AllMusic | 4.5/5 stars |
| Christgau's Record Guide | B+ |
| Creem | B |
| The Encyclopedia of Popular Music | 4/5 stars |
| The Rolling Stone Album Guide | 3.5/5 stars |
| Uncut | 1.5/5 stars |

Silver Pistol is an album by Brinsley Schwarz, released in 1972. It was the first album to include Ian Gomm.

== Critical reception ==
AllMusic wrote: "Silver Pistol isn't the definitive pub rock album, but it is the first great record to surface from the scene. Like much of the first wave of pub rock, Silver Pistol is quiet, laid-back and low-key -- with its warm, rustic sound and a gentleness that infuses even the rockers, this is the closest to the Band that the Brinsleys got."

Record World said of the single "Nightingale" that "this lilting ballad is a perfect wedding of music and lyrics."

== Track listing ==
All tracks composed by Nick Lowe; except where indicated

1. "Dry Land" (Ian Gomm) – 2:42
2. "Merry Go Round" – 4:11
3. "One More Day" (Ian Gomm) – 2:54
4. "Nightingale" – 3:07
5. "Silver Pistol" – 3:38
6. "The Last Time I Was Fooled" – 4:05
7. "Unknown Number" – 2:58
8. "Range War" (Ian Gomm) – 2:34
9. "Egypt" – 5:23
10. "Niki Hoeke Speedway" (Jim Ford) – 3:30
11. "Ju Ju Man" (Jim Ford, Lolly Vegas) – 3:37
12. "Rockin' Chair" (Ian Gomm) – 2:27

== Personnel ==
Brinsley Schwarz

- Brinsley Schwarz - guitar
- Ian Gomm - guitar, bass, vocals
- Billy Rankin - drums
- Bob Andrews - keyboards, vocals
- Nick Lowe - bass, guitar, vocals

Technical

- Anton Matthews - engineer, mixing
- Chris Hollebone - mobile engineer
- Jeff Powell - design, art direction
- Dave Robinson - producer
