= Brinsley Schwarz (album) =

Studio album by Brinsley Schwarz
- Released: 17 April 1970
- Recorded: Early 1970
- Studio: Olympic Studios, London
- Genre: Rock, pub rock
- Length: 39:42
- Label: Capitol (US) United Artists (UK)
- Producer: Brinsley Schwarz; Dave Robinson

Brinsley Schwarz chronology
Brinsley Schwarz (1970)	Despite It All (1970)

Professional ratings
Review scores
Source	Rating
Allmusic	2.5/5 stars

Brinsley Schwarz is the debut album by pub rock band Brinsley Schwarz, released in April 1970.

Recorded shortly after the band had changed its name from Kippington Lodge, the album was released just after the ill-fated "Brinsley Schwarz Hype". It has been described as a "naïve blend of Crosby, Stills & Nash, Dylan & the Band, and Buffalo Springfield, with a heavy dose of early Yes" (Stephen Thomas Erlewine).

The cover was designed by Barney Bubbles for his short-lived graphic art company "Teenburger Designs". The original vinyl album (Capitol 11869) was re-issued on CD in 1996 (Repertoire 0004421).

== Track listing ==
All songs are written by Nick Lowe except where specified

1. "Hymn to Me" (Lowe, Rankin, Schwarz, Andrews) – 4:50
2. "Shining Brightly" – 4:20
3. "Rock and Roll Women" – 3:19
4. "Lady Constant" – 7:23
5. "What Do You Suggest?" – 4:47
6. "Mayfly" – 4:37
7. "Ballad of a Has Been Beauty Queen" – 10:26

== Personnel ==
Brinsley Schwarz

- Brinsley Schwarz - guitar, percussion, vocals
- Billy Rankin - drums, percussion
- Bob Andrews - keyboards, bass, vocals
- Nick Lowe - bass, acoustic guitar, slide guitar, vocals

Technical

- Bob Hall - engineer
- Teenburger Designs - cover design, typography
