= Orchestre Jazira =

Orchestre Jazira was an Anglo-Ghanaian band. The band consisted of Jane Shorter playing tenor sax, Sofi Hellborg playing alto, Nigel Watson, Kwadwo Oteng playing keyboards, Opata Azu playing bass and Colin Bass. They broke up in 1987.

They released one album Nomadic Activities (1984).

== See also ==
- 3 Mustaphas 3
