= Despite It All =

Studio album by Brinsley Schwarz
- Released: 20 November 1970
- Recorded: 1970
- Studio: Olympic Studios, London
- Genre: Rock, pub rock, country rock
- Length: 38:39
- Label: Capitol
- Producer: Brinsley Schwarz; Dave Robinson

Brinsley Schwarz chronology
Brinsley Schwarz (1970)	Despite It All (1970)	Silver Pistol (1971)

Professional ratings
Review scores
Source	Rating
Allmusic	3/5 stars
Christgau's Record Guide	B+

Despite It All is a Country Rock album by pub rock band Brinsley Schwarz, released in 1970.

== Track listing ==
All songs are written by Nick Lowe except where specified

1. "Country Girl" – 3:10
2. "The Slow One" – 5:33
3. "Funk Angel" – 4:21
4. "Piece of Home" (Bob Andrews) – 6:19
5. "Love Song" – 4:10
6. "Star Ship" – 2:40
7. "Ebury Down" – 5:15
8. "Old Jarrow" – 7:11

== Personnel ==
Brinsley Schwarz

- Brinsley Schwarz – guitar, vocals
- Billy Rankin – drums, percussion, Good vibes
- Bob Andrews – keyboards, guitar, bass, vocals
- Nick Lowe – bass, guitar, banjo, vocals

Additional performers (credited as 'Superb Beauties')

- Dave Jackson – saxophone on "The Slow One" and "Funk Angel"
- Willy Weider – fiddle on "Country Girl"
- Brian Cole – pedal steel on "Star Ship"
