= Double Trouble (Frankie Miller album) =

Studio album by Frankie Miller
- Released: 1978
- Recorded: 1978
- Studio: The Record Plant, New York City
- Genre: Blues rock
- Length: 37:14
- Label: Chrysalis
- Producer: Jack Douglas

Frankie Miller chronology
Full House (1977)	Double Trouble (1978)	Falling in Love (1979)

Professional ratings
Review scores
Source	Rating
Allmusic	2/5 stars

Double Trouble is the fifth album by Frankie Miller. The album took shape in April 1978 at the Record Plant in New York, with Miller receiving backing from drummer BJ Wilson from Procol Harum, guitarist Ray Russell, two-man horn section Chris Mercer and Martin Drover, and keyboardist and vocalist Paul Carrack, who co-wrote five of the songs with Miller. Steven Tyler from Aerosmith also makes a guest appearance as backing vocalist

== Track listing ==
Side One

1. "Have You Seen Me Lately Joan" (Frankie Miller)
2. "Double Heart Trouble" (Andy Fraser)
3. "The Train" (Frankie Miller, Paul Carrack)
4. "You'll Be In My Mind" (Frankie Miller, Paul Carrack, Ray Russell, Jack Douglas)
5. "Good Time Love" (Frankie Miller, Paul Carrack)

Side Two

1. "Love Waves" (Frankie Miller, Paul Carrack)
2. "(I Can't) Break Away" (Frankie Miller, Paul Carrack)
3. "Stubborn Kind of Fellow" (Marvin Gaye, William "Mickey" Stevenson, George Gordy)
4. "Love Is All Around" (Andy Fraser)
5. "Goodnight Sweetheart" (Ray Noble, Jimmy Campbell, Reg Connelly)

Bonus Tracks

1. "(I Can't) Break Away (live)"
2. "Love Waves (live)"
3. "Good Time Love (live)"
4. "Have You Seen Me Lately Joan (live)"
5. "Double Heart Trouble (live)"
6. "Stubborn Kind of Fellow (live)"
7. "Goodnight Sweetheart (live)"

== Personnel ==
- Frankie Miller – vocals, guitar
- Ray Russell – guitar
- Ian Gomm – guitar
- Chrissy Stewart – bass guitar
- Paul Carrack – keyboards, backing vocals
- BJ Wilson – drums
- Martin Drover – trumpet, flugelhorn
- Chris Mercer – baritone & tenor saxophones
- Richard Supa – backing vocals
- Eric Troyer – backing vocals
- Steven Tyler – backing vocals, harmonica on 4, 6, 9, 10
- Karen Lawrence – backing vocals
- Lonnie Groves – backing vocals

=== Production credits ===
- Produced by Jack Douglas
- Engineered by Sam Ginsberg, Lee DeCarlo, Nigel Walker
