= High Life (Frankie Miller album) =

Studio album by Frankie Miller
- Released: January 1974 (UK) / July 1974 (North America)
- Recorded: 1973
- Studio: Web IV Recording Studio, Atlanta, Georgia; Horns: Studio in the Country, Bogalusa, Louisiana
- Genre: Blues rock
- Length: 36:13
- Label: Chrysalis
- Producer: Allen Toussaint

Frankie Miller chronology
Once in a Blue Moon (1973)	High Life (1974)	The Rock (1975)

Professional ratings
Review scores
Source	Rating
Christgau's Record Guide	B+

High Life is the second album by Frankie Miller. It was produced by Allen Toussaint, who also composed seven songs on the album. "Play Something Sweet (Brickyard Blues)" was released by Three Dog Night the same year as Miller's, and "Shoo Rah" was covered by Betty Wright—and both of these cover versions become chart hits.

Despite poor sales, the album was critically well received, although Miller was to disown it as Chrysalis Records issued the record in remixed form, without Miller's or Toussaint's knowledge or consent. The remix, by Don Davis and Lou Costello, remains the most widely available version of High Life; Toussaint and Miller's original mix of the album was made available on the 2011 Frankie Miller box set That's Who.

== Track listing ==
All tracks composed by Allen Toussaint, except where indicated:

Side One

1. "High Life"
2. "Play Something Sweet (Brickyard Blues)"
3. "Trouble" (Frankie Miller)
4. "A Fool"
5. "Little Angel" (Frankie Miller)
6. "With You in Mind"

Side Two

1. "The Devil Gun" (Frankie Miller)
2. "I'll Take a Melody"
3. "Just a Song"
4. "Shoo Rah, Shoo Rah"
5. "I'm Falling in Love Again" (Frankie Miller)
6. "With You in Mind (Reprise)"

Bonus Tracks

1. "Brickyard Blues (live)"
2. "The Devil Gun (live)"
3. "If You Need Me (demo)"
4. "With You In Mind (demo)"

== Personnel ==
- Frankie Miller - vocals, acoustic guitar

Rhythm

- Allen Toussaint - piano, organ, conga
- Joe Wilson - guitar, slide guitar
- Tom Robb - bass, conga
- Mike Huey - drums
- G. C. Coleman - drums
- Auburn Burrell - dobra guitar
- Barry Bailey - guitar

Horns

- Lester Caliste - trombone
- Clyde Kerr Jr - trumpet
- Gary Brown - tenor saxophone
- John Longo - trumpet
- Alvin Thomas - baritone saxophone

=== Production ===
- Recorded at Web IV Recording Studio, Atlanta, Georgia
- Engineered by Joe Wilson
- Horns recorded at Studio in the Country, Bogalusa, Louisiana
- Remix by Don Davis, Lou Costello at United Sound Studios, Detroit
- Arranged and Produced by Allen Toussaint
