= Full House (Frankie Miller album) =

Studio album by Frankie Miller
- Released: June 1977
- Recorded: 1976
- Studios: Air, Oxford Street, London; Wessex Sound, Highbury, London
- Genre: Blues rock
- Length: 33:41
- Label: Chrysalis
- Producer: Chris Thomas

Frankie Miller chronology
The Rock (1975)	Full House (1977)	Double Trouble (1978)

Professional ratings
Review scores
Source	Rating
AllMusic	3.5/5 stars

Full House is the fourth studio album by Frankie Miller, released in 1977. It features a mix of Miller originals and covers, including a version of John Lennon's "Jealous Guy". The Andy Fraser composition "Be Good to Yourself" was issued as a single, and reached No. 27 the UK singles chart, becoming Miller's first chart hit.

== Track listing ==
All tracks composed by Frankie Miller; except where indicated

Side one

1. "Be Good to Yourself" (Andy Fraser)
2. "The Doodle Song"
3. "Jealous Guy" (John Lennon)
4. "Searching" (Peter Knight, Bob Johnson)
5. "Love Letters" (Edward Heyman, Victor Young)

Side two

1. "Take Good Care of Yourself" (Jimmy Doris)
2. "Down the Honky Tonk"
3. "This Love of Mine" (Frankie Miller, Robin Trower)
4. "Let the Candlelight Shine"
5. "(I'll Never) Live in Vain"

Bonus tracks

1. "Free and Safe on the Road (live)"
2. "It Takes a Lot to Laugh, It Takes a Train to Cry (live)" (Bob Dylan)
3. "This Love of Mine (live)"
4. "Down the Honky Tonk (live)"

== Charts ==
Chart (1977)	Peak position
Australia (Kent Music Report)	89
Dutch Albums (Album Top 100)	18
Swedish Albums (Sverigetopplistan)	46
US Billboard 200	124

== Personnel ==
- Frankie Miller - vocals, rhythm guitar, acoustic guitar
- Ray Minhinnett - lead guitar
- Chrissy Stewart - bass guitar
- Jim Hall - piano, organ
- Graham Deakin - drums

Special guests

- Chris Spedding – guitar
- Rabbit – keyboards
- Gary Brooker – keyboards
- The Memphis Horns – horn section

Production credits

- Produced by Chris Thomas
- Engineered by Steve Nye
- Assisted by Nigel Walker
- Orchestral Arrangements on "Searching" by Peter Knight
