= Brinsley Schwarz =

English pub rock band

- Origin: England
- Genres: Pub rock; roots rock
- Years active: 1969–1975
- Labels: Liberty, United Artists (UK), Capitol, United Artists (US)
- Members: Nick Lowe; Brinsley Schwarz; Billy Rankin; Bob Andrews (died 2025); Ian Gomm (1970–1975)

Brinsley Schwarz were a 1970s English pub rock band, named after their guitarist Brinsley Schwarz. With Nick Lowe on bass and vocals, keyboardist Bob Andrews and drummer Billy Rankin, the band evolved from the 1960s pop band Kippington Lodge. They were later augmented by Ian Gomm on guitar and vocals.

== Formation ==
Brinsley Schwarz (guitar, piano, vocals) originally met Nick Lowe at Woodbridge School where they played in school bands with Barry Landeman (keyboards, vocals) and Phil Hall (guitar). In 1964, whilst still at school, they toured RAF bases in Germany as "Sounds 4+1". On leaving school, Schwarz formed "Three's A Crowd" with Pete Whale (drums) and Dave Cottam (bass). Landeman joined in 1967 and they renamed themselves "Kippington Lodge". Their first two singles, produced by Mark Wirtz, in a close-harmony pop style, both flopped. Cottam left, and Schwarz invited Lowe to join. Landeman then left to join Vanity Fare, Bob Andrews joined on keyboards, and finally, Whale was replaced by Billy Rankin on drums. Although the next three singles also failed, they had a residency as support band at the Marquee Club. The band's style was changing from pop into "a folk-rock band with psychedelic pretentions". In 1969 they renamed the band after their guitarist, and performed their new music under this name, whilst continuing to play pop as Kippington Lodge. One of the band's first managers, John Schofield, was at the time the lover of Hattie Jacques (who would occasionally make bacon sandwiches for the band members when they visited Schofield's home). In the early part of their career the band shared a communal home in a large old house in Beaconsfield and these premises were used as a rehearsal space by The Band, who came to the UK as part of the Warner Brothers tour. The Band borrowed Brinsley Schwarz's instruments to rehearse.

== Publicity campaign ==
Brinsley Schwarz signed a contract with manager Dave Robinson, of Famepushers, who devised a plan to earn the band extensive publicity. They were to open for Van Morrison and Quicksilver Messenger Service at the Fillmore East in New York City, on 3 and 4 April 1970. Robinson would fly a plane full of British journalists to the show, so they could review it, along with the winners of a Melody Maker competition, arranged in order to get pre-publicity. Several of these journalists were already big names in their field, such as Richard Williams of Melody Maker, Pete Frame of ZigZag, Charlie Gillett of the Record Mirror and Jonathan Demme of Fusion. Also on the plane's passenger list were a number of invited "scenemakers", most notably Johnny Byrne and Jenny Fabian (co-authors of Groupie), Sam Hutt (aka Hank Wangford), the millionairess Olga Deterding (who was suspected at the time of funding the whole enterprise) and Jonathan Routh of Candid Camera fame.

Though the band had planned on leaving a few days early so they could rehearse, visa problems prevented this, so they went to Canada and entered the US in a light aircraft. They arrived in New York shortly before they were due on stage, and had to use hired equipment with which they were unfamiliar. The journalists were due the following day, but their plane was delayed for four hours, so they had free use of the bar, and eventually arrived at the show either drunk or hung over (Jonathan Routh got so intoxicated during the journey that, in the words of Dave Robinson, he "threw up, projectile vomiting all over the plane"). The show did not go over well, and the band received a flood of negative reviews over the following weeks, including bad reviews of their first album, Brinsley Schwarz, which was released shortly after their return to the United Kingdom. This incident became known as the Brinsley Schwarz Hype.

Casey Kasem's version of this story, in a September 1979 episode of American Top Forty, implied that the presence of the critics was a surprise to the band.

== Pub-rock ==
Later in 1970, Brinsley Schwarz released their second album, Despite It All, which had a definite country sound to it. They were heavily influenced by Eggs over Easy, whom they first saw perform at 'The Tally Ho' in Kentish Town, and admired their laid-back style and extensive repertoire. In 1971, guitarist Ian Gomm joined the band, and they recorded their third album Silver Pistol. In response to "the hype", they became anti-commercial and spent much of 1971 rehearsing, although they toured on the 'Downhome Rhythm Kings' package with Help Yourself and Ernie Graham (ex Eire Apparent), who were all managed by Dave Robinson. This led to them backing Ernie Graham on his eponymous solo album.

Brinsley Schwarz played at the second Glastonbury Festival (1971), and one track, "Love Song", appeared on the subsequent Glastonbury Fayre album. Their solid live performances soon garnered the band a large fanbase in London, and, along with bands like Eggs over Easy, Brinsley Schwarz were soon dubbed "pub rock" by rock journalists. They sounded rather like The Band, with Schwarz's guitar work influenced greatly by Robbie Robertson's. In February 1972, they supported Hawkwind and Man at the Greasy Truckers Party, which was issued as a double album, and brought critical acclaim. Unfortunately, for a band known for its live performances, this was their only live album.

1972's ironic take on country-rock, Nervous on the Road, also received excellent reviews. It did not reach the charts, but earned them a slot opening for Paul McCartney's Wings 1973 UK Tour. The same year, they also acted as Frankie Miller's band for his debut album Once in a Blue Moon. Their fifth studio album Please Don't Ever Change, issued in 1973, was less well received by the critics, and achieved poor sales. However, during this time they made successful appearances on The Old Grey Whistle Test with Lowe on guitar and vocals, Gomm on bass and Schwarz on piano alongside Andrews on keyboard and recorded sessions for John Peel's BBC Radio 1 show. In 1974, they arranged for Dave Edmunds to produce their sixth album The New Favourites of... Brinsley Schwarz, which was more polished, and again received good reviews. This association also led to their touring as Dave Edmunds' backing band, appearing on the live tracks of his Subtle as a Flying Mallet album. In addition to the albums, Brinsley Schwarz also issued a series of singles under their own name, and various pseudonyms, such as "The Hitters", "The Knees", "Limelight" and "The Brinsleys", but these all failed. They recorded a final album, It's All Over Now, in 1974 but this was not released at the time. They finally disbanded in March 1975.

== Subsequent careers ==
Brinsley Schwarz and Bob Andrews joined Graham Parker & the Rumour, which functioned as a unit through 1981. Later Andrews moved to New Orleans. Schwarz, meanwhile, continued playing as a sideman for various artists through the 1980s, 1990s and 2000s. Schwarz joined a reunited Ducks Deluxe in 2009, then both Schwarz and Andrews joined a reunited Rumour in 2012.

Billy Rankin joined Terraplane and then Big Jim Sullivan's Tiger. He retired from the music industry in 1977, though he was persuaded to play with a reunited Ducks Deluxe for their 30th anniversary reunion show in 2007.

Nick Lowe and Ian Gomm both began solo careers, achieving moderate mainstream success. Lowe's 1978 album Jesus of Cool received considerable critical acclaim and reached number 22 in the UK Albums Chart. It included the track "I Love the Sound of Breaking Glass", which reached number 7 in the UK Singles Chart. The album also included Bob Andrews on keyboard and Dave Edmunds on guitar. Lowe also co-wrote Dr. Feelgood's top ten hit "Milk and Alcohol", which reached number 9 in 1979. Lowe's 1979 single and biggest worldwide hit "Cruel to Be Kind" was co-written with Gomm and originally recorded by Brinsley Schwarz for their unreleased final album. This version was included on the 2008 30th anniversary edition of the Jesus of Cool album. In 1979, Gomm himself had a hit with "Hold On", which reached number 18 in the U.S. Billboard Hot 100 chart.

The original version of "(What's So Funny 'Bout) Peace, Love, and Understanding", which was written by Lowe and was later covered by Elvis Costello, was released by the band in 1974 on their album The New Favourites of... Brinsley Schwarz. Costello knew of the song as both a fan and part-time roadie for the band, which is where he and Lowe first met. Another rendition was featured on the multi-million-selling film soundtrack The Bodyguard: Original Soundtrack Album, performed by Curtis Stigers. Bill Murray's character sang the song at a party in Sofia Coppola's film Lost in Translation.

== Discography ==
=== Studio albums ===
- Brinsley Schwarz (April 1970)
- Despite It All (December 1970)
- Silver Pistol (February 1972)
- Nervous on the Road (September 1972)
- Please Don't Ever Change (October 1973)
- The New Favourites of... Brinsley Schwarz (July 1974)
- It's All Over Now (1988)
- What IS So Funny About Peace Love & Understanding (2001)
- Live Favourites (2015)
- Live Archive Volume One Tilburg (2019)
- Live Archive Vol. 2 The Black Swan, Sheffield (2019)
- Live Archive Vol. 3 The Vera Club, Groningen, Holland (2020)
- Live Archive Vol. 4 Köln And Paris (2023)
- Live at Rockpalast 1975 (2025)

=== Singles ===
- "(What's So Funny 'Bout) Peace, Love, and Understanding" (1974)

=== Archive release ===
- It's All Over Now (seventh album recorded 1974, but unreleased until a 1987 mix by Ian Gomm was released by Decal/Charly on CD in 1988, and then a newer mix was officially released 2017)

=== Compilations ===
- Original Golden Greats (1974) (includes two live tracks and two studio tracks not included on other albums) (LP)
- The Classic British Rock Scene (1975) (Double LP)
- Brinsley Shwarz (1978) (Contains the albums Brinzley Schwarz and Despite It All; LP, cassette and CD)
- 15 Thoughts of Brinsley Schwarz (1978) (includes two singles not included on other albums) (LP)
- Surrender to the Rhythm (1991) (CD)
- Nervous On The Road/The New Favourites Of... Brinsley Schwarz (1995) (CD)
- Hen's Teeth (singles) (1998)
- Rarities (July 2000)
- Original Golden Greats / Fifteen Thoughts Of Brinsley Schwarz (2000) (Two albums on one CD.)
- What IS So Funny About Peace Love & Understanding? (BBC recordings) (2001)
- Cruel to Be Kind (BBC recordings) (2004)
- Last Orders! (2021) (early recordings for radio and television, outtakes, rehearsals, and home recordings)
- Thinking Back : The Anthology 1970-1975 (2023) box set including all seven studio albums with bonus tracks (non-album singles, live recordings, previously unreleased outtakes)

=== Various artists albums ===
- Glastonbury Fayre (April 1972)
- Greasy Truckers Party (April 1972)

=== As a backing band ===
- Ernie Graham (1971) – Ernie Graham's only solo album
- Once in a Blue Moon (1973) – Frankie Miller's debut album
- Subtle as a Flying Mallet (1975) – Dave Edmunds, only the live tracks
