= The Wilderness Years =

The Wilderness Years may refer to:

- Winston Churchill: The Wilderness Years, 1981 drama serial based on the life of Winston Churchill
- The Wilderness Years (album), an album by Nick Lowe
- Adrian Mole: The Wilderness Years, the fourth book in the Adrian Mole series, written by Sue Townsend
- The period between the 1989 cancellation and 2005 revival of Doctor Who
