= The Rock (The Frankie Miller Band album) =

Studio album by The Frankie Miller Band
- Released: September 1975
- Recorded: 1975
- Studio: His Masters Wheels (San Francisco)
- Genre: Blues rock
- Length: 62:36 (2003 reissue/eagle records)
- Label: Chrysalis
- Producer: Elliot Mazer

The Frankie Miller Band chronology
High Life (1974)	The Rock (1975)	Full House (1977)

Professional ratings
Review scores
Source	Rating
Christgau's Record Guide	B

The Rock is the third album from Frankie Miller, and the only one officially credited to The Frankie Miller Band. The album features backing from The Memphis Horns and The Edwin Hawkins Singers.

The album was recorded in sight of the prison of Alcatraz in San Francisco, Miller commented that it was only music that had saved him that kind of fate and dedicated the song, The Rock, to the plight of prisoners, a reference to his second cousin Jimmy Boyle.

"Ain't Got No Money" became the album’s most covered song with notable versions from Cher, Chris Farlowe and Bob Seger. The song, "Drunken Nights in the City", was written for his late-night drinking buddy Jimmy Johnstone, the former (Celtic FC) Scottish footballer. Etta James covered the song A Fool in Love for her 1990 album, Stickin' to My Guns. "A Fool in Love" was also covered by UFO.

== Track listing ==
All tracks are written by Frankie Miller, except where noted.

No.	Title	Writer(s)	Length
1.	"A Fool in Love"	Andy Fraser, Frankie Miller	3:02
2.	"The Heartbreak"		4:01
3.	"The Rock"		3:32
4.	"I Know Why The Sun Don’t Shine"	Fraser, Miller	5:59
5.	"Hard on the Levee"		3:15
6.	"Ain’t Got No Money"		2:53
7.	"All My Love to You"		5:35
8.	"I’m Old Enough"		4:50
9.	"Bridgeton"		4:45
10.	"Drunken Nights in the City"		3:51
11.	"Loving You Is Sweeter Than Ever" (1998 CD bonus track)	Ivy Jo Hunter, Stevie Wonder	3:27
12.	"I’m Old Enough (single edit)" (1998 CD bonus track)		3:24
13.	"Hard On The Levee (live)" (2003 CD bonus track)		3:30
14.	"Sail Away (live)" (2003 CD bonus track)	Randy Newman	5:15
15.	"Drunken Nights (live)" (2003 CD bonus track)		5:29
16.	"Walking The Dog (live)" (2003 CD bonus track)	Rufus Thomas	6:11

== Personnel ==
Musicians

- Frankie Miller - vocals, rhythm guitar
- Henry McCullough - lead guitar, backing vocals
- Mick Weaver - keyboards
- Chrissy Stewart - bass guitar
- Stu Perry - drums, percussion
- James Dewar - backing vocals
- The Memphis Horns - horn section
- The Edwin Hawkins Singers - backing vocals

Production credits

- Produced by Elliot Mazer
- Engineered by Jeremy Zatkin, Elliot Mazer
- Recorded at His Master's Wheels, San Francisco
