= Soup of the Century =

Studio album by 3 Mustaphas 3
- Released: 1990
- Genre: Balkan music, folk, worldbeat
- Label: Rykodisc

3 Mustaphas 3 chronology
Heart of Uncle (1989)	Soup of the Century (1990)	Friends, Fiends & Fronds (1991)

Soup of the Century is an album by the British band 3 Mustaphas 3, released in 1990. It was the band's final studio album. 3 Mustaphas 3 supported the album with a UK tour. The album peaked at No. 1 on Billboard's World Albums chart.

== Production ==
Soup of the Century was the first album with Daoudi Mustapha on saxophone. Among the instruments used on the album were the tapan, the hardingfele, and the dumbek. "Soba Song" is a tribute to the noodle. "Ti Citron" is a mazurka.

== Critical reception ==
Professional ratings
Review scores
Source	Rating
AllMusic	5/5 stars
The Encyclopedia of Popular Music	3/5 stars
MusicHound World: The Essential Album Guide	4/5 stars
The Rolling Stone Album Guide	4/5 stars

The Washington Post thought that "these are six Brits playing the lively, underappreciated dance musics of the Balkans with little purism and great enthusiasm." Spin called 3 Mustaphas 3 "blissfully afloat in the context of no context," writing that "parody's the last thing on the band's collective open global mind." The Philadelphia Daily News praised "Soba Song", calling it "a culture clashing, Western swing ditty blended with snippets of Yugoslavian kolo (a kind of two step rhythm), and fleshed out with lyrics in both Japanese and English."

The Orlando Sentinel wrote that, "for those world-music fans more interested in originality than authenticity, the Mustaphas' gleeful blend of purloined ethnic influences is a treat... The group's sound is all over the map—and not a particularly accurate map at that." The Los Angeles Times determined that the music is "rooted as much in rock and rap as in the sounds of Eastern Europe and the Near East, and then branching out into myriad ethnic styles, including African highlife, classical Indian and Caribbean merengue." The Times-Picayune concluded that the album "mixes Middle Eastern, African, Asian and other styles with a deadpan that has earned the band a reputation as the Marx Brothers of world music."

AllMusic noted that "'Soba Song' is essentially country music, but with mostly Japanese lyrics (and touches of Jewish klezmer thrown in), while 'This City Is Very Exciting!' may be the only time Mexican ranchero music has been sung in Hindi."

== Track listing ==
No.	Title	Length
1.	"Bukë E Kripë Në Vatër Tonë/Kalaxhojne"
2.	"Zohar No. 2"
3.	"Soba Song"
4.	"Golden Clarinet"
5.	"Ti Citron"
6.	"Sadilo Mome/Tropnalo Oro"
7.	"This City Is Very Exciting!"
8.	"Yogurt Koydum Dolaba/Televizyon"
9.	"Lipovacko Kolo"
10.	"Madre"
11.	"Ya Habibi, Ya Ghaybine"
12.	"Mamo, Snezhets Navalyalo"
