= 3 Mustaphas 3 =

- Origin: London
- Genres: World music

3 Mustaphas 3 is a British world music band formed in 1982. Its core members are Ben Mandelson (under the name Hijaz Mustapha), Tim Fienburgh (1954–2008) (under the name Niaveti III), Colin Bass (under the name Sabah Habas Mustapha), and Nigel Watson (under the name Houzam Mustapha), around which orbit many other Mustaphas – all supposed to be the nephews of Uncle Patrel Mustapha (Lu Edmonds). They claim to originate from the Balkans, but play music from various parts of the world. Their slogan, "Forward in all directions!", is an expression of this musical diversity. Active at the end of the 1980s and the beginning of the 1990s, they have now stopped producing and performing together, but haven't officially disbanded.

== Biography ==
Liner notes from their albums would have it that the band was created in a Balkan town called Szegerely (possibly derived from the Hungarian region of Székely), where it played at the Crazy Loquat Club, before the members were transported inside refrigerators to England.

In truth, however, the creation of the band began in 1982 when guitarist and musicologist Ben Mandelson, also known as Hijaz Mustapha, and Uncle Patrel, also known as Lu Edmonds, started playing together, along with Patrel's other "nephews", namely Houzam, Isfa'ani, Oussack and Niaveti III. Before world music became a genre, they were already playing musical styles from all around the globe. According to band members the first concert was held in a London restaurant that year. The early 3M3 line-up was noticed by BBC Radio 1's John Peel, for whom they recorded several Peel Session broadcasts. A concert in Berlin followed, and two mini-albums were subsequently released, but their first full-length album, Shopping, was not recorded until 1987. The album covered a wide array of genres also including a cover of Moroccan Najat Aatabou's "Shouffi Rhirou". By then Oussack had left the band, but bassist Sabah Habas Mustapha, who may in fact be Colin Bass, and accordionist Kemo Mustapha had joined.

Their second full-length album, Heart of Uncle, was released in 1989 and showed Middle Eastern, Mediterranean, Irish and Latin American influence. Soup of the Century, released in 1990, was their most acclaimed success. With tracks ranging from a country song in Japanese to a Mexican traditional sung in Hindi, and going through a mix of Irish, Scottish, Greek, Albanian, klezmer and many more styles, the Mustaphas broke many barriers separating ethnic music styles.

Daoudi joined during the recording and performed woodwinds. The Mustaphas had also been assisted on occasions by Lavra Tima Daviz on vocals and Expen$ive on trumpet, while guests Israeli singer Ofra Haza, and kora players Dembo Konte and Kausu Kuyateh from The Gambia and Senegal respectively have played alongside them in the 1980s.

The band toured extensively in Europe, Scandinavia, Japan, the United States and Canada, playing clubs and international festivals (Moers, Glastonbury, Winnipeg).

A final album, Friends, Fiends & Fronds was released in 1991, containing non-album singles, remixes and two new recordings. By the end of the year the band was no longer playing together. Sabah Habas pursued a solo career, releasing albums as Colin Bass, or performing with his band Camel as well as the Jugala Allstars from Indonesia, and Hijaz became a producer. The two were featured, together with Houzam, in an album from Zimbabwean artist Stella Chiweshe. Between 1988 and 1992, Hijaz, Houzam and Sabah Habas worked together on further recording projects with renowned artists from the World Music scene: Tarika Sammy (Madagascar), Rinken Band (Okinawa), Dembo Konte & Kausu Kuyateh (The Gambia). Oussack (Ray Cooper) joined Oysterband under the name Chopper.

Another 3M3 album was released in 1997 containing live performances, and Sabah Habas and Hijaz came together again in 2001 to pick songs to include in their final live album, Play Musty for Me.

During the height of their fame, the 3 Mustaphas 3 invited audiences to bring ripe cheeses to concerts, which the Mustaphas would attempt to identify on stage. An onstage refrigerator holding fresh fruit which could be offered to the audience was an essential item demanded by the band from any serious concert promoter. Indeed, the fridge itself was a revered item for the Mustapha family (as it keeps food fresh) hence the cry often heard in intense moments of performance: "Can we take it to the fridge? Let me take it to the fridge!"

=== Post-breakup ===
In 2008, together with Ian A. Anderson, Mandelson and Edmonds formed the trio Blue Blokes 3 and released the album Stubble (Fledg'ling Records). They toured UK venues in January 2009. Later in 2009, together with Justin Adams, Mandelson and Edmonds formed the band Les Triaboliques and released their debut album Rivermudtwilight.

On 22 January 2010, Uncle, Hijaz, Sabah Habas, Kemo, Oussack and Expen$ive reformed to play one song, "Si vous passez par là" at The Roundhouse, Camden, London, in a concert to celebrate the 30th anniversary of fRoots magazine.

== Members ==
Founding members

- Uncle Patrel Mustapha bin Mustapha (Lu Edmonds) — saz, "taxi"
- Hijaz 'Hank' Mustapha (Ben Mandelson) — bouzouki, violin, cümbüs, banjo, cello-banjo, Hawaiian guitar, "Western guitars", "Balkan steel guitar", box guitar, "dry guitar", keman, ukulele, tambura, mbira, baglama
- Houzam Mustapha (Nigel Watson) — drum kit, cymbals, bells, bendir, conga, singing
- Isfa'ani Mustapha (Salah Dawson Miller) — percussion, including ganza, xequere, tambourine, electro tam-tam, darbouka, ti bois, campaña, djembé, tama, gankogui, conga, guiro, bendir, shekere, don-don, krakebs, pandeiro, cuica, bells, bata, cymbals, electro gamelan, talking drum)
- Oussack Mustapha (Ray Cooper, active 1982–1987) — cello
- Niaveti Mustapha 3 (Tim Fienburgh) — "jazz flute", bass flute, wooden flute, piccolo, ney, kaval, bagpipes, zurna, bombarde, piano & button accordions, zil, tulum, jew's harp, gajde, melodeon, chang, vocals

1987 additions

- Sabah Habas Mustapha (Colin Bass) — electric bass guitar, bass fiddle, darbouka, singing
- Lavra Tima Daviz Mustapha — Swahili, Hindi, Greek, French & Spanish singing
- Kemo "Kem Kem" Mustapha (Kim Burton) — keyboards, including piano, piano accordion, organ, kaval, dayereh, synth, qifteli, and tumbadora, as well as conga, bendir, accordion case, and furniture

Credited occasional members

- Expen$ive Mustapha (Chris Batchelor) — golden trumpet, tenor horn
- Daoudi Bitelic Mustapha (Dave Bitelli) — alto, tenor & baritone saxophones, golden G-clarinet, B-flat clarinet, bendir
- Jocelyn Pook — viola
- Clare Finnemore — viola
- Rachel Maguire — cello
- Robert Woollard — cello
- Anne Solomon Stephenson — violin
- Sally Herbert — violin
- Kathryn Shave — violin
- Richard Koster — violin
- Michael Thomas — violin
- Mairi Campbell — viola
- Zimonz — electronical drums
- Duane Mustapha — Western guitar
- the Loquat Pathfinders Dance Club — dancing
- Andreos Blake — soprano & alto sax, clarinet
- Telor Borrachon Pavel (Paul Taylor) — trombone
- Bondo Fernandez — tabla
- Dave Pattman — tambora, conga, guayo
- Robin Adnan Mustaffasson (Robin Anders)— dumbek, tapan, zil, tambourine
- Tommy Habas — singing in English
- Gasper Lawal — bass drum, talking drum, congas, sekere, agogo, claves

== Discography ==
- Bam! Mustaphas Play Stereo, 1985
- Orchestra BAM de Grand Mustapha International and (Jolly) Party, 1985
- From the Balkans to Your Heart: The Radio Years, 1986
- Moushmoumkine, 1987
- Shopping, 1987
- Trouble Fezz meets 3 Mustaphas 3, 1988
- Heart of Uncle, 1989
- Soup of the Century, 1990
- Friends, Fiends & Fronds, 1991
- Bam: Big Mustaphas Play Stereolocalmusic (CD issue of the two BAM vinyl EPs), 1997
- Play Musty for Me, 2001
