= Colin Scot =

British singer-songwriter

- Born: Colin Thistlethwaite; 17 March 1941; County Durham, England
- Died: 1999 (aged 57–58) Amsterdam, The Netherlands
- Occupations: Singer, songwriter, guitarist
- Labels: United Artists, Warner Bros.

Colin "Scotty" Thistlethwaite (17 March 1941 – 1999), who performed and recorded as Colin Scot, was a British singer-songwriter.

== Life and career ==
He was born in County Durham, England, to parents originally from California. In the mid-1950s, he moved with his parents to London, Ontario, Canada, and after high school he studied at California State University at Long Beach. In the early 1960s, he played banjo and guitar, and with pianist Bud Hedrick formed a ragtime duo, Bud and Scotty, who played regularly at Coke Corner in Disneyland. There, he came to know members of folk revival vocal group the Yachtsmen Quartet, who regularly led hootenanny-style entertainments at Disneyland, sometimes featuring artists such as the Dillards, Hoyt Axton, José Feliciano, and John Denver.

In 1965, Scot joined the Yachtsmen for their tour of Europe, where they changed their name to The What's New. They played regularly at the Casino nightclub in Paris, France, and recorded for the Number One label. Their first record, a version of Gordon Lightfoot's "Early Morning Rain", reached the French pop charts in 1966, and their next single, "Get Away" / "Up So High", comprised two songs both written by Scot, and was again successful in France. However, the band soon fragmented, in part out of problems with their management.

Scot went to London and played regularly in folk clubs both there and elsewhere in England in the early 1970s. He was signed by United Artists Records and recorded a self-titled debut album produced by John Anthony at Trident Studios. Issued in 1971, the album featured some self-penned songs as well as others, and included contributions from such musicians as Rick Wakeman, Robert Fripp, Peter Gabriel, Jon Anderson, Phil Collins, Peter Hammill, Alan Hull, and Brinsley Schwarz. Though not a commercial success at the time, the album "eventually took on the luster of a cult classic not only for its passionate songwriting, but for the impressive roster of musicians who contributed to it". Scot continued to perform regularly around the country, and released two more albums, for Warner Bros. Records, Just Another Clown (1973) and Out of the Blue (1974), but again they were not commercially successful.

A popular and highly respected club performer with "dynamic stage presence and larger-than-life personality", Scot was also known for his considerable alcohol consumption. In the 1980s he settled in Amsterdam, where he died in 1999.
