= Eire Apparent =

Band from Northern Ireland

- Origin: Belfast, Northern Ireland
- Years active: 1967–1970
- Labels: Track Records; Buddah Records
- Past members: Ernie Graham; Davy Lutton; Chris Stewart; Henry McCullough; Mick Cox; David 'Tiger' Taylor; Peter Tolson; Steve Jolly

Eire Apparent were a band from Northern Ireland, noted for launching the careers of Henry McCullough and Ernie Graham, and for having Jimi Hendrix play on, and produce, their only album.

== History ==
=== Tony and The Telstars ===
The origins of the group stretch back to early '60s Belfast band Tony & The Telstars, which featured lead guitarist Rod Demick (born Roderick Demick, 1947, Prestatyn, Flintshire, North Wales), drummer Davy Lutton (born William David Lutton, 1946, Belfast), lead vocalist and guitarist George O'Hara and bassist Chris Stewart (born Eric Christopher Stewart, 1946, Belfast, Co Antrim). During 1965, Demick departed to join local R'n'B group The Wheels and Stewart joined German-based Irish band The Stellas. Their replacements included guitarist David "Tiger" Taylor, bassist Mike Niblett (from The Stellas) and apprentice auto mechanic Ernie Graham (born Ernest Harold Graham, 14 June 1946, Belfast) on rhythm guitar and backing vocals.

=== The People ===
In late 1965 Lutton, O'Hara, Niblett and Graham formed pop outfit The People along with former Them keyboard player Eric Wrixon. They contributed two songs to the February 1966 compilation album Ireland's Greatest Sounds: Five Top Groups From Belfast's Maritime Club. In mid-1966 a "browned-off" Eric Wrixon announced the band were moving to England: "We hope it's forever... Nowhere, but nowhere, could be worse than Belfast." At the time they were using a stand-in guitarist in place of O'Hara and hoping to recruit Billy Harrison (ex-Them). Very soon afterwards Wrixon defected to another Belfast group resident on the Blackpool scene, The Wheels. Meanwhile, Mike Niblett and Chris Stewart had each swapped places and returned to their original bands. Guitarist Henry McCullough (formerly of The Sky Rockets Showband and Gene and The Gents) from Portstewart in Northern Ireland teamed up with The People in early 1967 and they quickly developed a strong reputation on the Blackpool and then (briefly) the Dublin music scenes.

=== Eire Apparent ===
In 1967 the band moved to London and were signed by ex-Animal Chas Chandler and Mike Jeffery, who changed the band's name to 'Eire Apparent' – Jeffery wanted to exploit the Irish dimension and his wife came up with the new name.

Eire Apparent were briefly signed to Track Records, who also handled Chandler and Jeffery's protégé Jimi Hendrix, and recorded one single, "Follow Me" / "Here I Go Again," released in January 1968, before they left Track. Despite only having released the one single, Chandler and Jeffery sent them on tour to North America with headliners The Animals during February and March 1968. Things went well until, in Vancouver, Canada in mid February, McCullough was busted for possession of marijuana and sent back to Ireland, so guitarist Mick Cox (born Michael Charles Cox, 1943, Gillingham, Kent, died August 2008; formerly of The Alleykatz and The End) flew out to take his place in the band. By May McCullough had joined Sweeney's Men in Ireland.

The new line-up continued to tour North America with the Jimi Hendrix Experience and Soft Machine, and held recording sessions in New York's Record Plant studio with Hendrix in May (probably taping their next single "Let Me Stay" / "Yes I Need Someone"). The album Sunrise was mostly cut in late October 1968 in Los Angeles, with Jimi Hendrix producing. Hendrix also played on a number of tracks (including "Yes I Need Someone" and "The Clown"), whilst Noel Redding, Mitch Mitchell and Robert Wyatt are also credited (Redding and Wyatt singing on "1026" and/or "The Clown"). The album was released on Buddah Records in the US and the UK in May 1969.

Cox was replaced by guitarist David "Tiger" Taylor in November 1968, shortly after the album was recorded. Taylor had already been a member of The People during 1965, and he co-wrote their "Rock 'N' Roll Band" single recorded in London in January 1969, again featuring Jimi Hendrix. This line up of Taylor, Graham, Stewart and Lutton then toured Europe with Hendrix and in April 1969 recorded the band's only Peel Session. Guitarist Peter Tolson, who later joined the Pretty Things, is also cited as having replaced Taylor on this session. Guitarist Steve Jolly formerly of Sam Apple Pie later joined the band.

In May 1969, Beat Instrumental reported that they were recording tracks for a second Eire Apparent album (reportedly produced by Soft Machine drummer Robert Wyatt) but it never saw the light of day. In May 1970, hardly noticed by the public, the band broke up.

== Subsequent careers ==
- Ernie Graham recorded one solo album in 1971, was briefly a member of Help Yourself in 1972 and then co-founded pub rock combo Clancy. He then gave up being a professional musician, worked on the railways, and was training to become a counsellor when he died in April 2001.
- Davy Lutton played with Heavy Jelly in 1970, Ellis (1972–73), T. Rex (1974–76) and assisted Chris Spedding on his 1979 Guitar Graffiti album.
- Chris Stewart became one of rock's most durable bass players and a musical partner for Frankie Miller (1975–78). Further jobs include Ronnie Lane's Slim Chance, Spooky Tooth, Joe Cocker, Jim Capaldi, Eric Burdon, Graham Bonnet, and Terry Reid. He died in 2020.
- Henry McCullough joined Sweeney's Men and, later on, became The Grease Band's lead guitarist. From 1971 to 1973 he played with Paul McCartney and Wings, before he too spent time playing with Frankie Miller. He also released several solo albums. He died in 2016.
- Mick Cox formed Magnet (1969–71). Their first single in August 1969 was "Let Me Stay" / "Mr. Guy Fawkes" – both originally from the Sunrise album. He later formed his eponymous band in 1973 which included Chris Stewart (one album on Capitol Records) and played on Van Morrison's album Common One in 1983. According to Tony Brown's sleeve notes, Cox offered the tapes of a Hendrix jam-session to Peter Shertser of Red Lightin' Records, which were released as Woke Up This Morning and Found Myself Dead
- David "Tiger" Taylor later formed Anno Domini, who recorded one album, before joining The Freshmen.
- Peter Tolson played for the Pretty Things from 1970 to 1976. He too died in 2016.
- Steve Jolly joined Bobby Harrison (ex Procol Harum drummer), Pete Dennis and Roger Saunders in their band, Freedom.

== Discography ==
- "I'm With You" / "Well... All Right" (as 'The People') – included on Ireland's Greatest Sounds (Ember Records LP, February 1966)
- "Follow Me" / "Here I Go Again" (Track Records single, January 1968)
- "Yes I Need Someone" / "Let Me Stay" (Buddah Records single, circa September 1968)
- "Rock 'N' Roll Band" / "Yes I Need Someone" (Buddah Records single, March 1969, and in the UK on Buddah 201 039 Apr 1969, re-released on Buddah 2011 117 Mar 1972)
- Sunrise (Buddah Records LP, May 1969, Buddah 203 021 in the UK)
- "The Price of Love" / "Highway 61" / "Blues" / "Gloria" – live recordings included on the Jimi Hendrix Experience bootleg Liederhalle Stuttgart 19 January, 1969 1st Show (Eire Apparent were the support act)
- "Gloria" / "Yes, I Need Someone" – BBC Top Gear recordings from April 1969 included on The Pretty Things unauthorised CD The Forgotten Beebs (Tendolar, 2008; Pretty Things guitarist Peter Tolson supposedly played on these tracks; "Highway 61 Revisited" was also recorded at this session)
