= Ernie Graham =

Irish singer and guitarist (1946–2001)

- Born: Ernest Graham; 14 June 1946; Belfast, Northern Ireland
- Died: 27 April 2001 (aged 54) London, England
- Genres: Pub rock, folk
- Occupations: Musician, songwriter
- Instruments: Guitar, vocals
- Years active: 1965–1981
- Labels: Stiff, Liberty

Ernie Graham (born Ernest Graham; 14 June 1946 – 27 April 2001) was a Northern Irish singer, guitarist and songwriter, active from the mid-1960s to the early 1980s.

== Early life ==
Ernie Graham was born in Belfast, and was training to be a mechanic when he joined his first band, Tony & the Telstars, in 1965, as rhythm guitarist. When the band split, Graham and two other members moved to England, where Graham met Henry McCullough. Graham and McCullough returned to Belfast and formed The People, with George O'Hara, Davey Lutton and Chris Stewart.

== Eire Apparent ==
In 1967, the band moved back to London, where they came to the attention of Michael Jeffery and were signed by him and Chas Chandler. In 1968, they changed their name to Eire Apparent and toured with Soft Machine, Pink Floyd and Jimi Hendrix.

Eire Apparent only recorded one album Sunrise (1969), which was produced by Hendrix, who also played on the album. Shortly after McCullough left, to tour with The Grease Band, Eire Apparent disbanded. Graham moved in with McCullough and recorded four songs with The Grease Band, but these were never issued.

== Solo and Help Yourself ==
Graham was then signed to Liberty Records as a solo artist, by Andrew Lauder. Sharing management with Brinsley Schwarz and Help Yourself, they all toured together as "The Down Home Rhythm Kings" package and lived in the same commune in Northwood. Both bands also backed Graham on his eponymous solo album Ernie Graham (1971). The album was well received, described as "one of the most hauntingly beautiful" albums of the pub-rock scene, and "one of the more distinctive and memorable solo albums of the period", but sold poorly.

Graham and "JoJo" Glemser then joined Help Yourself, appearing with them at the Glastonbury Festival in 1971 and playing on their second album Strange Affair (1972), although Graham left the band before the album was released.

== Clancy ==
In 1973, Graham formed pub rock band Clancy, who were initially signed to Island Records, but issued two albums and a single on Warner Bros. Records. When Clancy broke up in 1976, Graham played with Nick Lowe and tried to go solo, issuing Phil Lynott's "Romeo and the Lonely Girl" as a single in 1978, which was his last release.

== Later life and death ==
In the early 1980s, Graham tried forming a band with Larry Pratt, who had briefly been a member of Clancy, but when this failed, Graham gave up being a professional musician, worked on the railways, including as a guard on the Orient Express, and was training to become a counsellor, but his "strong alcohol dependence" caused his health to fail, and he died in London in April 2001.

== Discography ==
With The People

- Ireland's Greatest Sounds: Five Top Groups from Belfast's Maritime Club – 1966 – Ember Records

(2 tracks – "I'm with You" and "Well...All Right")

- Reissued on Belfast Beat Maritime Blues – Big Beat

With Eire Apparent

- Sunrise, 1969

Solo

- Ernie Graham, 1971, Liberty 83485 AllMusic link

(reissued on CD with single as bonus tracks Hux 32 (2002), LP reissued on 4Men With Beards 4m227 2014)

- "Romeo and the Lonely Girl" / "Only Time Will Tell" – 1978 single – Stiff

With Help Yourself

- Strange Affair, 1972, United Artists UAS 29287 (reissued on CD 1999)

With Clancy

- Everyday, 1975
- Seriously Speaking, 1975

Various artists compilations

- All Good Clean Fun, 1971 ("Don't Want Me Round You") – only on 1971 vinyl LP, not on 2004 CD re-release
- Naughty Rhythms: The Best of Pub Rock, 1996 ("Don't Want Me Round You")
- Goodbye Nashville, Hello Camden Town, 2007 ("Sweet Inspiration" and "Baby You're All I Need" – only issued on this release)
