= Frankie Miller =

Scottish singer-songwriter (born 1949)

- Born: Francis John Miller; 2 November 1949 (age 76); Bridgeton, Lanarkshire, Scotland
- Genres: Rock; hard rock; folk rock; blues rock; blue-eyed soul; soul
- Occupation: Singer-songwriter
- Instruments: Vocals; guitar; harmonica
- Years active: 1966–1994
- Labels: Chrysalis; Capitol; Mercury
- Website: Frankie Miller.net

Francis John Miller (born 2 November 1949) is a Scottish rock singer-songwriter and actor.

Miller wrote for and performed with many recording artists and is best known for his 1977 album Full House, the singles "Be Good To Yourself", "Darlin'" and his duet with Phil Lynott on the Thin Lizzy song "Still in Love with You".

== Early life ==
Miller was born in Bridgeton, Glasgow, Scotland in 1949.

== Career ==
=== 1966–1972: Early career ===
Miller began singing professionally as a teenager with a Glasgow band called 'The Stoics'. In mid 1970, he moved to London to further his career. He performed with the band 'Howl' at the 1970 Isle of Wight Festival. He soon joined up with guitarist Robin Trower, ex-Stone the Crows bassist/singer James Dewar, and former Jethro Tull drummer Clive Bunker to form the short-lived group 'Jude'. This outfit did not record and soon split.

=== 1972–1974: First albums and collaboration with Thin Lizzy ===
Later in 1972, Miller signed a solo recording contract with Chrysalis Records, and recorded his first LP Once in a Blue Moon, with record producer Dave Robinson. The album was an early example of pub rock, and featured backing by the pub rock band Brinsley Schwarz. Miller received consistently good reviews, although his singles and albums were not chart hits, Chrysalis continued to invest in his talent. In 1974 Miller sang "Still in Love with You", as a duet with Phil Lynott; the song appeared on the Thin Lizzy album, Nightlife. Miller's second album High Life, was produced and partly written by Allen Toussaint and recorded in Atlanta, Georgia during 1974. Although two album tracks, "Shoo Rah, Shoo Rah" and "Play Something Sweet (Brickyard Blues)", subsequently provided hits for Betty Wright and Three Dog Night respectively, the album was not a commercial success.

=== 1975–1979: Subsequent albums and "Darlin'" ===
Miller's next album The Rock (1975) was recorded in San Francisco using the producer Elliot Mazer, who had co-produced Harvest for Neil Young. The next album Full House (1977), was produced by Chris Thomas. The lead off track "Be Good to Yourself" became Miller's first UK top 40 hit, peaking at No. 27 in the UK Singles Chart during June that year. In 1978 Miller hit the UK top 10 with the song "Darlin'", which peaked at No. 6 on 14 October 1978. "Darlin'" also made the Billboard "Bubbling Under" chart in the US, peaking at No. 103. The next single penned by Miller "When I'm Away From You" rose to No. 42 in UK, but failed to chart in US.

During 1979, Miller wrote the opening and closing songs on the film A Sense of Freedom, as well as performing on them. He diversified into acting. During 1979 Miller starred in Peter McDougall's TV film, Just a Boys' Game, directed by John Mackenzie.

=== 1980–1993: Later albums and "Caledonia" ===
In 1980, Miller released his seventh album, Easy Money. The lead single, "Why Don't You Spend the Night", was a minor hit in Australia. Miller later re-recorded the album's closing track, "Tears", as a duet with Bonnie Tyler on her album Faster Than the Speed of Night (1983). Miller moved to Capitol Records for his next album, Standing on the Edge. It was noted by Newsday as a departure from the R&B influences on his earlier releases, sounding more like the music of rock bands Foreigner and Bad Company.

In 1986, Miller released his final studio album, Dancing in the Rain. It was produced by John Jansen, and like its predecessor, the album was noted for its rock influences. Mark Deming of AllMusic compared it to Robert Palmer's single "Addicted to Love" and said that the album sounds more "dated" than his earlier work. It peaked at No. 39 on the Swedish Albums chart.

In 1991, Miller recorded an excerpt of "Caledonia" for a Tennent's lager television advert. After a surge of requests from viewers, Miller recorded and released a full-length version as a single in 1992. It peaked at No. 45 on the UK Singles Chart. Later that same year, Miller recorded a second duet with Bonnie Tyler, titled "Save Your Love", for her album Angel Heart.

In 1993, Miller recorded "Why Don't You Try Me" with Sarah Bettens for the Belgian film Ad Fundum. The track was produced by Ry Cooder and peaked at No. 6 on the Belgian Flanders chart. "Where Do the Guilty Go?", which also featured in the film, later peaked at No. 46.

=== 1994–present: Illness, recovery and tribute albums ===
In 1994, Miller formed a new band with Joe Walsh, Nicky Hopkins and Ian Wallace. He was writing music in New York City when he suffered a brain aneurysm on 25 August 1994. Miller was unconscious for five months, and when he woke up he found himself unable to speak or sing. He spent the subsequent years in physical rehabilitation.

In September 1998, a benefit concert was held at the Queen's Hall, Edinburgh featuring Jools Holland, Paul Carrack, Bonnie Tyler and a band of musicians with disabilities. The concert was filmed as part of the BBC Television documentary series Ex-S and broadcast in 1999. The episode was titled Frankie Miller: Stubborn Kinda Fella, and it documented Miller's road to recovery. The episode was nominated for Best Regional Documentary at the Royal Television Society awards.

A number of tribute albums have since been released, including A Tribute to Frankie Miller (2003), which features covers and duets with various artists, and 100% Pure Frankie Miller (2014) by Spike of The Quireboys.

In 2006, Miller released a new studio album, Long Way Home, featuring vocals extracted from demos he recorded before his brain aneurysm. The tracks were produced by Bill Szymczyk, Will Jennings and David Naughton. Another album, Frankie Miller's Double Take, followed in 2016, featuring 19 demos remastered into duets with other artists. The album peaked at No. 11 on the Scottish Albums Chart.

In March 2022, Miller released the track "One More Step to the Rainbow" as a protest to the 2022 Russian invasion of Ukraine.

== Discography ==
=== Albums ===
==== Studio albums ====
Year	Title	Chart positions					
Year	Title	UK	US	AUS	NL	NOR	SWE
1973	Once in a Blue Moon	—	—	—	—	—	—
1974	Frankie Miller's High Life	—	—	—	—	—	—
1975	The Rock [as the Frankie Miller Band]	—	—	—	—	—	—
1977	Full House	—	124	89	18	—	46
1978	Double Trouble	—	177	—	—	—	—
1979	Falling in Love [released as A Perfect Fit in US]	54	—	89	—	8	—
1980	Easy Money	—	—	100	—	—	41
1982	Standing on the Edge	—	—	—	—	—	—
1986	Dancing in the Rain	—	—	—	—	—	39
2006	Long Way Home	—	—	—	—	—	—
2016	Frankie Miller's Double Take	100	—	—	—	—	—
"—" denotes releases that did not chart or were not released in that territory.

==== Live albums ====
- BBC Radio 1 Live in Concert (1977/1978/1979 [1994])
- Live at Rockpalast (1976/1979/1982 [2013]) 3-CD set

==== Compilations ====
Year	Title	Chart positions
Year	Title	NOR
1978	Frankie Who? Frankie Fucking Miller That's Who	5
1980	I'm Only Serious	—
1993	The Very Best of Frankie Miller	—
2004	Angels with Dirty Faces	—
2011	Frankie Miller ...That's Who! The Complete Chrysalis Recordings (1973-1980) [7-CD]	—
2014	Frankie Miller – Original Album Series [5-CD]	—
"—" denotes releases that did not chart.

=== Charted singles ===
Year	Title	Chart positions							
Year	Title	UK	US	AUS	AUT	BEL	NL	NZ	NOR
1977	"Be Good to Yourself"	27	—	—	—	—	—	—	—
1977	"The Doodle Song"	—	71	—	—	—	—	—	—
1978	"Love Letters"	—	—	79	—	16	11	—	—
1978	"Darlin'"	6	—	8	3	28	—	7	1
1979	"When I'm Away from You"	42	—	—	—	—	—	—	—
1980	"Why Don't You Spend the Night"	—	—	94	—	—	—	—	—
1982	"To Dream the Dream"	—	62	—	—	—	—	—	—
1992	"Caledonia"	45	—	—	—	—	—	—	—
1993	"Why Don't You Try Me"	—	—	—	—	6	—	—	—
1993	"Where Do the Guilty Go"	—	—	—	—	46	—	—	—
"—" denotes releases that did not chart or were not released in that territory.

== Bibliography ==
- Encyclopedia of Rock. Hardy, Phil and Laing, Dave. Schirmer Books (1988). ISBN 0-02-919562-4
