= Brinsley Schwarz (musician) =

English guitarit and rock musician (born 1947)

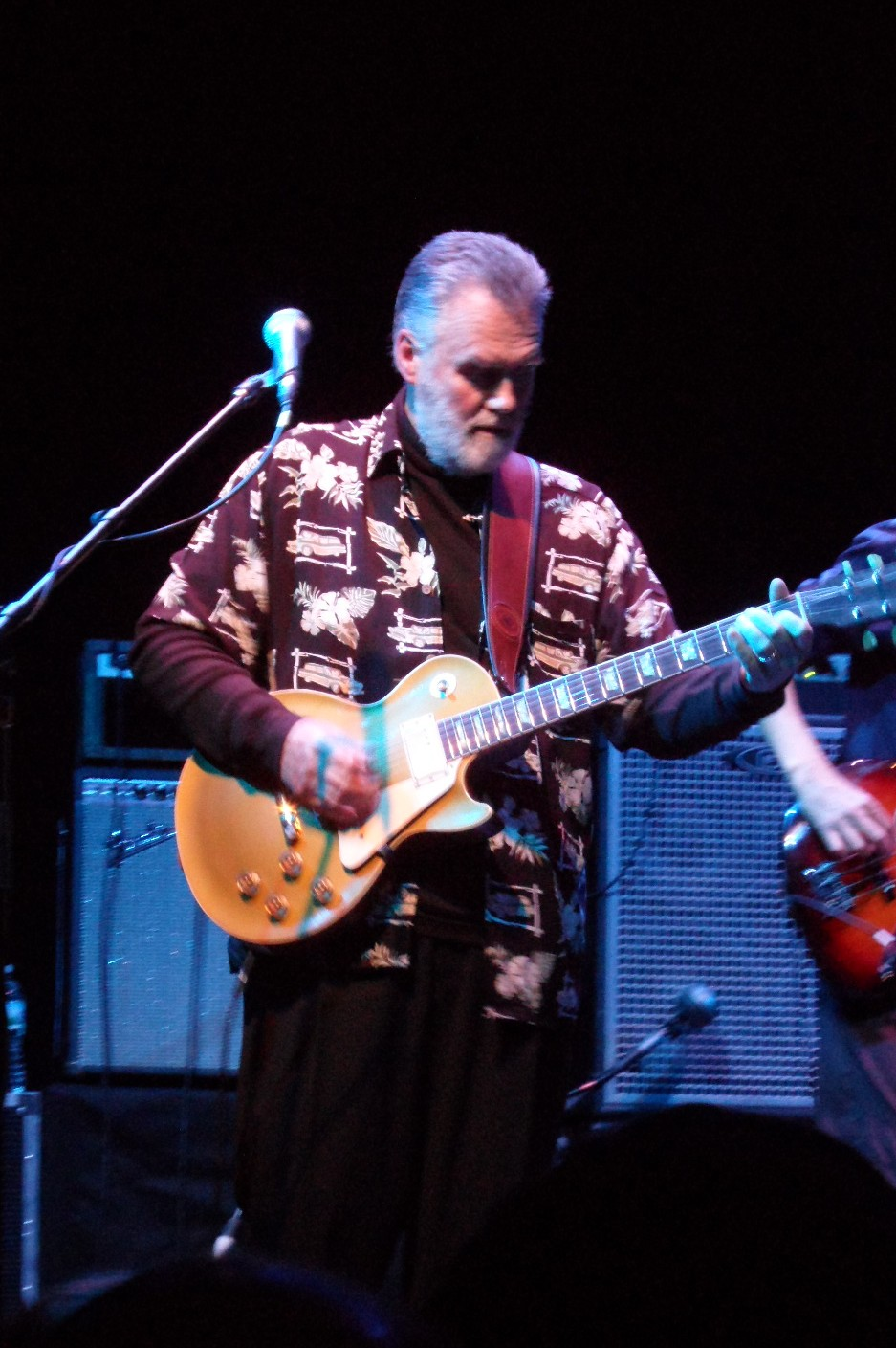

Background information
- Born: Brinsley Ernst Peter Schwarz; 15 August 1947 (age 78); Woodbridge, Suffolk, England
- Genres: Rock; new wave; pub rock; soul; rhythm and blues
- Instruments: Guitar; piano; organ; saxophone; vocals
- Years active: 1965–1989–2010–present
- Website: Brinsley Schwarz on Bandcamp

Brinsley Ernst Pieter Schwarz (born 15 August 1947) is an English guitarist and rock musician. He is best known for playing in his eponymous band, as well as Ducks Deluxe and The Rumour. He has also recorded and produced with Colin Scot, Ernie Graham, Frankie Miller, Al Stewart, Dr. Feelgood, The Kursaal Flyers, Dave Edmunds, Carlene Carter, Nick Lowe, Desmond Dekker, Garland Jeffreys, Any Trouble, Duncan Dhu, Rachel Sweet, Man, and Mikel Erentxun.

== Early life ==
Brinsley Schwarz's family roots are Dutch. His father was Wym Schwarz, a maths teacher, and his mother was Joan, who was English. Schwarz attended Woodbridge School with Nick Lowe.

Schwarz "fell in love" with the guitar after hearing "Apache" by The Shadows on the radio. The Shadows' lead guitarist, Hank Marvin, has been cited as one of Schwarz's influences, as well as The Beatles, Elvis Presley, Chuck Berry, Albert King, The Band, Bob Dylan, Little Feat, Steely Dan, Robben Ford, Larry Carlton and Amos Garrett.

== Career ==
=== Brinsley Schwarz (band) ===
As a teenager, he formed his first band, Three's A Crowd with bass player Dave Cottam and drummer Pete Whale. They changed their name to Kippington Lodge in 1967 and added Barry Landeman on keyboards. Cottam left and Nick Lowe joined and Landeman left to join Vanity Fare and was replaced by Bob Andrews and in 1969 changed their name to Brinsley Schwarz, named after Schwarz, which came around after he was the only member who voted not to change the band name. The band released six albums and only one single before breaking up in 1974.

=== Later career ===
After the band broke up, Schwarz briefly joined Ducks Deluxe on their final tour. Ducks Deluxe ended the following year, which led to Schwarz forming The Rumour and going on to achieve success with Graham Parker as Graham Parker and the Rumour, having three UK top 40s between 1977 and 1978 before splitting in 1981. He also toured with Carlene Carter and Garland Jeffreys.

In the 1980s, Schwarz learned how to build and repair guitars at Chandler Guitars, and eventually, he retired from live performing in 1989, due to growing tired of touring and because of an unusual disliking of flying, and he became a fulltime luthier. He briefly returned to music in 2010 to perform with The Rumour again for a few reunion dates, and he returned to music full-time in 2012, re-joining Ducks Deluxe for their last year, before they split up in 2013.

In 2016, he toured with Graham Parker. For nearly two decades (1980s–2000s), Schwarz rarely wrote songs, but after hearing Steely Dan's Two Against Nature album, Schwarz became inspired to write again and has since released three albums: Unexpected, a self-released album in 2016, on which he played all guitars and bass and sang all the vocals, Tangled in 2021 and Shout at the Moon in 2025, both released by Fretsore records.

== Solo discography ==
- Unexpected (2016) (self-released)
- Tangled (2021) (Fretsore Records)
- Shout at the Moon (2025) (Fretsore Records)
