= Ian Gomm =

British musician (born 1947)

- Born: 28 March 1947 (age 79); Chiswick, West London
- Origin: England
- Occupations: Guitarist, singer and songwriter

Ian Robert Gomm (born 17th March 1947 in Chiswick, West London) is a British guitarist, singer and songwriter who was the rhythm guitarist for Brinsley Schwarz from 1970 to 1974. He was named "Best Rhythm Guitarist" by NME in 1971.

== Early career ==
Gomm's career began circa 1962/1963 in Unit 4, a group which evolved out of an outfit formed by Gomm on rhythm and lead guitar and vocals, Martin Davis on bass and Simon Behar on drums, all of whom were pupils at Ealing County School for Boys. Soon after this formation, Frank Kennington, who was older than the others, joined as lead vocalist, and they became Unit 4. Mick Lieber, who had previously played with Frankie Reid & The Casuals and Clay Alison and the Searchers, joined Unit 4 around July 1964, but the new line-up was short-lived. Around October 1964, Kennington left and moved to Sydney, Australia, precipitating Unit 4's eventual break-up.

Gomm played in bands as a teenager, including The Generation and The Triangle, a three piece Tamla group. He then joined The Unknowns, a band who, apart from Gomm himself, were Jewish. They would play at The Ealing Jewish Youth Club every week, and once a month were supported by Del Angelo and The Detours; the members of The Detours consisted of Roger Daltrey and Pete Townshend on guitar and John Entwistle on bass, who would later form The Who, and who the Unknowns would become friends with. He spent five years as a young man working as an electrical apprentice for EMI.

In 1975, following his time in Brinsley Schwarz, Gomm and his wife moved to Mid Wales, where he still lives. Reminiscing about playing in Wales with his band, he said: "All of our four children learnt Welsh at school so perhaps that night at the Dixieland at Colwyn Bay Pier had more of an influence on my life than I knew at the time!" In Mid Wales, he built a recording studio, where he worked with musicians such as the Stranglers and Alexis Korner. He also toured with Dire Straits on their Sultans of Swing tour.

== Solo work ==
Gomm's first solo album, Summer Holiday, came out in 1978. The album was re-titled and re-sequenced (with two extra tracks) as Gomm with the Wind. A single from the album, "Hold On", reached No. 18 in the United States, and No. 44 in Canada in 1979. "Hold On" has since been featured as bumper music on the radio show Coast to Coast AM. Gomm also re-released his best-known song from his tenure in Brinsley Schwarz, "Hooked on Love", as a single on Stiff Records in 1979, with "Chicken Run" as the B-side.

In addition, Gomm co-wrote the song "Cruel to Be Kind" with his former Brinsley Schwarz bandmate Nick Lowe, and Lowe's 1979 recording of the track reached No. 12 on all three of the UK Singles Chart, Australian Kent Music Report and the U.S. Billboard Hot 100 (Lowe's most successful U.S. solo hit) that year. Gomm went on to release the solo albums What a Blow, The Village Voice and Images in the 1980s. He continued to write songs and built a new studio.

The album Crazy for You was released in 1997, and Rock 'N' Roll Heart, featuring Jeff "Stick" Davis and Pat McInerney, was released in 2002.

Gomm released the 2010 album Only Time Will Tell with the American singer-songwriter Jeb Loy Nichols for the Relaxa Records label. They recorded 14 new tracks together at Gwyn Jones's Bos Studio in Llanerfyl, Mid Wales. Nashville musicians Clive Gregson and Pat McInerney also contributed in between UK touring commitments. It was mixed at the Butcher Shoppe Studio in Nashville by David Ferguson and mastered at Foxwood Mastering by Dave Shipley.

== Solo discography ==
=== Albums ===
- 1978: Summer Holiday (Re-released, slightly altered, as Gomm With the Wind in 1979)
1. "Hooked On Love”
2. "Sad Affair”
3. "Black And White”
4. "Come On”
5. "Hold On”
6. "Airplane”
7. "24 Hour Service”
8. "That´s The Way I Rock ´n´ Roll”
9. "Dirty Lies”
10. "You Can't Do That”
11. "Chicken”
12. "Another Year”
- 1981: What a Blow
1. "Man on a Mountain”
2. "Do It in Style”
3. "Jealous”
4. "It Don’t Help”
5. "Here It Comes Again”
6. "What a Blow”
7. "Nobody’s Fool”
8. "Slow Dancin’”
9. "Heartache”
10. "I Like You I Don't Love You" (Nick Lowe-Ian Gomm)
11. "I Just Want to Stay Here”
12. "Jaguar”
- 1982: The Village Voice
- 1986: Images (Re-released as Cheap Hearts Hurt and What Makes a Man...)
- 1997: Crazy for You
- 2002: Rock 'N' Roll Heart

=== Live ===
- 2002: 24 Hour Service (Recorded live in San Francisco in 1979)

=== With Jeb Loy Nichols ===
- 2010: Only Time Will Tell
