= Lisa Barros D'Sa =

Northern Irish film director, writer and producer

- Born: May 1974 (age 52); Belfast, Northern Ireland
- Occupations: film director, writer, producer
- Notable work: Ordinary Love
- Spouse: Glenn Leyburn

Lisa Barros D'Sa (born May 1974) is a Northern Irish film director, writer and producer. Barros D'Sa studied English at University of Oxford and holds an MA in screenwriting from London University of the Arts.

She is best known for co-directing and producing the 2019 feature film Ordinary Love and she has also co-directed the films Good Vibrations and Cherrybomb with husband Glenn Leyburn. Based on these three "strikingly different" feature films, the Irish Times described Barros D'Sa and Leyburn as "the most important contemporary filmmakers working from Northern Ireland".

== Background ==
Barros D'Sa was born in Belfast, Northern Ireland in 1974. Her father was Dr. Aires Agnelo Barnabé Barros D'Sa (1939–2007), a Goan born in Nairobi who was a leading vascular surgeon during The Troubles. Her mother Elizabeth (Libby) was an anaesthetist.

== Career ==
In 2006, Barros D'Sa founded a film production company called Canderblinks Film with long-term collaborators Glenn Leyburn and David Holmes.

Barros D’Sa's directorial debut in 2006 was The 18th Electricity Plan, a short film based on her own screen play and co-directed with husband and collaborator Glenn Leyburn. The film played at various international film festivals including LA Shorts, Clermont-Ferrand and Cork International Film Festival, where it won a Special Mention in the Best Short Film category.

=== Cherrybomb ===
Her feature film debut Cherrybomb followed in 2009. Co-directed with Leyburn and starring Rupert Grint, Robert Sheehan and Kimberley Nixon, Cherrybomb had its world premiere in competition at the 2009 Berlinale Generations and was subsequently bought by Indi Vision/Universal Pictures for distribution in the UK.

=== Good Vibrations ===
In 2012 Barros D'Sa and Leyburn completed their second feature, Good Vibrations a comedy drama/biopic about Belfast music fan Terri Hooley, doyen of the Belfast punk scene in Troubles-beset 1970s Belfast. Barros-D’Sa described it as "a film that is set in the context of The Troubles but it doesn't approach it from one side or the other. It is really about people who were living in that world but don't want to be defined by it".

A Canderblinks co-production with Revolution Films London, the film was also made with BBC Films, Irish Film Board and Northern Ireland Screen.

Good Vibrations was written by Colin Carberry and Glenn Patterson and stars Richard Dormer, Jodie Whittaker, Adrian Dunbar, Liam Cunningham, Karl Johnson and Dylan Moran. Good Vibrations opened internationally at the 46th Karlovy Vary International Film Festival. The Hollywood Reporter described it as a 'charming musical film' which kicked off the festival 'with the right energy'. It won Best Irish Film at the Galway film fleadh 2012 and the Audience Award at the Belfast film Festival. It was nominated in several categories in the 10th Irish Film & Television Awards winning best Costume Design for Maggie Donnelly and with Barros D'Sa and Leyburn receiving a nomination for the Rising Star Award.

Good Vibrations had an initial screening at Belfast Film festival in 2012 and wider theatrical release in 2013 garnering positive reviews with a 94% score on Rotten Tomatoes and scooping Guardian top critic Mark Kermode's Award for Best Film in 2013.

=== Ordinary Love ===
Working from Owen McCafferty's screenplay, Barros D'Sa and Leyburn directed their third feature film Ordinary Love. Starring Lesley Manville and Liam Neeson, the film observes the heartbreak, intimacy and resilience that follows when long married couple Joan and Tom are confronted with a sudden cancer diagnosis.

The film received funding from the BFI film fund backed by National Lottery. Barros D’Sa described the film as "a story about a couple who have small but seismic moments in their lives, and go on a journey, separately and together, that moves their life forwards... It was about creating that considered stillness, and allowing the dynamic moments to really land".

Interviewed for the Toronto International Film Festival, where Ordinary Love had its premiere in 2019, she described how the film "celebrates the ordinary miracle of a connection between two people that gives them both life". In an interview with the Irish Times, Barros D'Sa described the film as "a story that’s celebrating the poetry of ordinary life and ordinary moments and the texture and normality of a long-term love".
