= Shock Treatment (band) =

Shock Treatment was a post-punk band formed in Belfast in 1978 built around vocalist Barry McIlheney, (vocals), guitarist Davy McLarnon (guitar), and bassist David ‘Basil’ McCausland (bass).

The line-up went through several line-ups including founding members Tim Kerr (guitar), and Chris Loughridge (drums) before stabilizing as a four-piece with drummer Paul Kelly, formerly of The Lids.

== History ==
Taking as inspiration bands such as The Ramones, the band started to play at Belfast punk venue The Harp Bar and were picked up by local impresario and label-owner Terri Hooley.

Hooley had them record two tracks, Belfast Telegraph and I Like It Like That for a proposed 7' single release on his Good Vibrations label but which, due to financial pressures on the label's budget, did not appear. (Good Vibrations later added both sides of the aborted Shock Treatment single to the tracklisting for the compilation album Ulster on a Thin Wire scheduled in 1980 but also aborted.) Belfast Telegraph eventually surfaced in 1980 on the Room To Move EP featuring fellow Belfast bands The Outcasts, Big Self and Dublin band The Vipers.

Shock Treatment became a popular live act, for a period hosting their own venue at the Bailey Bar in Belfast and playing all of the venues associated with that city's 'punk explosion' in the late seventies. They set up their own Maximum Beat and Evenings and Weekends tours with fellow Belfast band Lovers of Today, playing widely on both sides of the border in Ireland. Now very popular on the North West circuit of clubs, pubs and surfing venues alongside regular touring partners Guilty Achievements Shock Treatment's status ensured that they began appearing at the province's larger venues in Belfast, including support slots at The Ulster Hall to visiting acts including The Skids, U2 and Psychedelic Furs.

Their second release came on the D.A.B. Record label set up by the band's management Davy and Alan Brown. Big Check Shirts c/w Mystery Man received airplay on national radio in Ireland and the UK.

== Dissolution and rebirth ==
The departure in 1982 of vocalist Barry McIlheney to what would become a successful career in music journalism brought an end to the band. McIlheney wrote for and edited Melody Maker and Smash Hits among others, later founding Empire magazine and moving further into publishing.

Guitarist Davy McLarnon then formed a songwriting partnership with the bassist of similarly-defunct Guilty Achievements. This led to their formation of the band Five Boys (1983–86), later Big Electric PLC (1986–88), for which they wrote and performed material before McLarnon joined Peace Frog in the 90's.

In 2011, this songwriting partnership recorded or re-recorded Shock Treatment and Five Boys songs for a studio project. These tracks were released in 2014 on the debut album by Shock Treatment 21, a fresh incarnation of the band with McLarnon as a sole original member alongside John Rossi and Keith McVeigh from his subsequent band, Peace Frog.

Reviving the Shock Treatment fan-base and interest in the earlier band's legacy, Shock Treatment 21 has since become one of Northern Ireland's popular live acts, sharing bills with the likes of 999, The Lurkers, John Otway and Alabama 3. Dropping the '21' from their name, Shock Treatment, released their second album, 'Exclusive Photos', featuring Barry McIlheney once again on lead vocals, in early 2024.

== Discography ==
- 1980 Room To Move 7-inch EP (feat. Belfast Telegraph), Energy Records (NRG1)
- 1981 Big Check Shirts c/w Mystery Man, 7-inch single, D.A.B. Records (DAB001)
- 2014 The Days of the Buckshee Bounce are Nearly Over, album, Spit Records (GOB5)
- 2024 Exclusive Photos, album, Spit Records (GOB34)
