= Good Vibrations (film) =

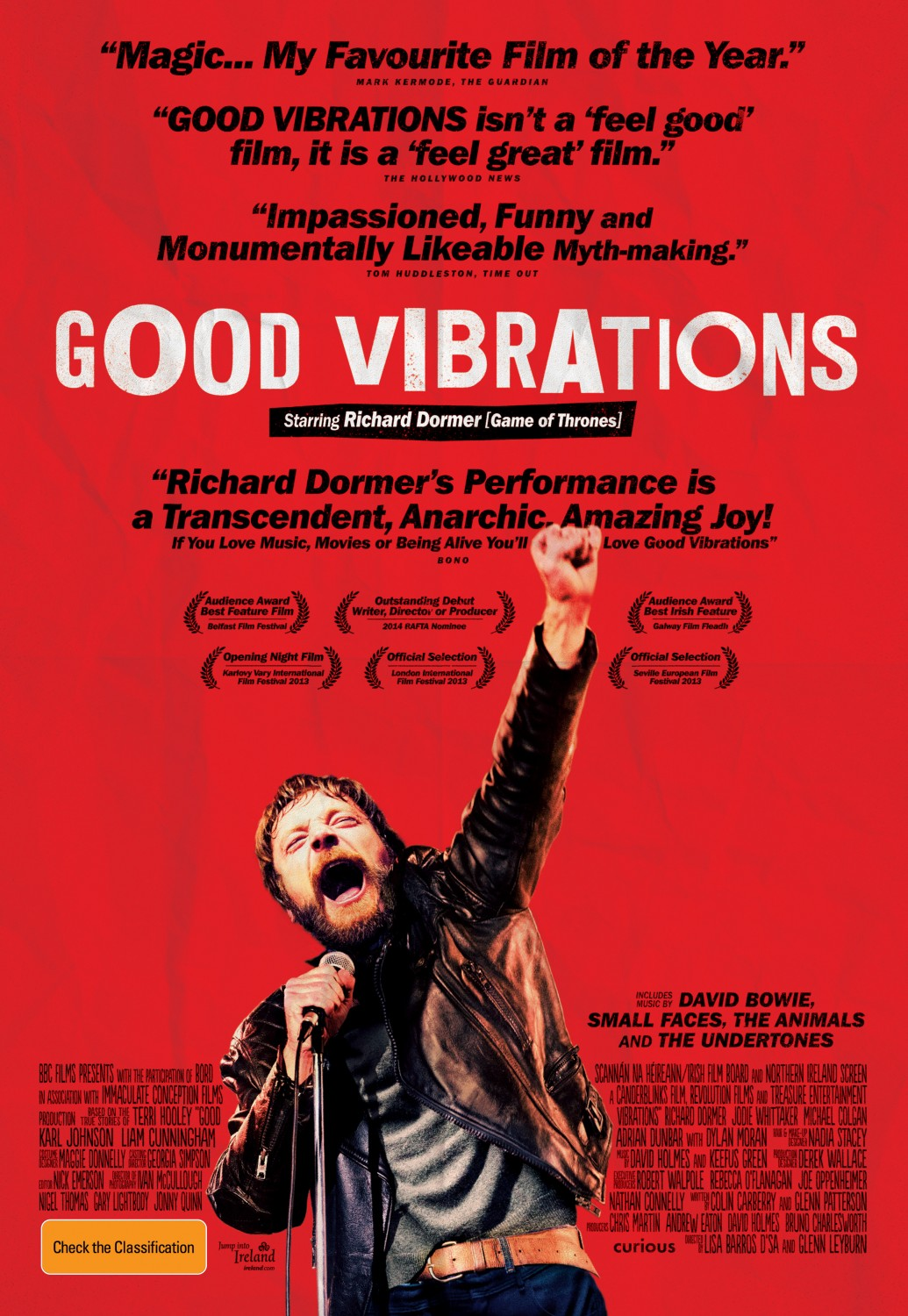
- Theatrical release poster
- Directed by: Lisa Barros D'Sa; Glenn Leyburn
- Written by: Colin Carberry; Glenn Patterson
- Produced by: Chris Martin; Andrew Eaton; David Holmes; Bruno Charlesworth
- Starring: Richard Dormer; Jodie Whittaker; Michael Colgan; Adrian Dunbar; Liam Cunningham; Dylan Moran; Karl Johnson
- Cinematography: Ivan McCullough
- Edited by: Nick Emerson
- Production companies: The Works; BBC Films; Northern Ireland Screen; Irish Film Board; Immaculate Conception Films; Canderblinks Film; Revolution Films; Treasure Entertainment
- Distributed by: Universal indiVISION; The Works
- Release date: 29 March 2013
- Running time: 102 minutes
- Countries: United Kingdom; Ireland
- Language: English

Good Vibrations is a 2013 comedy-drama film written by Colin Carberry and Glenn Patterson and directed by Lisa Barros D'Sa and Glenn Leyburn. It stars Richard Dormer, Jodie Whittaker, Adrian Dunbar, Liam Cunningham, Karl Johnson and Dylan Moran. It is based on the life of Terri Hooley, a record-store owner instrumental in developing Belfast's punk rock scene. The film was produced by Chris Martin, with Andrew Eaton, Bruno Charlesworth and David Holmes. Holmes also co-wrote the soundtrack score.

== Plot ==
In 1970s sectarian Belfast in the midst of The Troubles, Terri Hooley is a DJ who opens a record shop "on the most bombed half-mile in Europe". He is a music-lover, idealist, radical and rebel. He is inspired by the new underground punk scene and in turn galvanises the young musicians, branching out into record production and bringing life to the city.

== Cast ==
- Richard Dormer as Terri Hooley
- Jodie Whittaker as Ruth
- Michael Colgan as Dave Hyndman
- Karl Johnson as George Hooley
- Adrian Dunbar as Gang Leader
- Liam Cunningham as Studio Engineer
- Dylan Moran as Harp Owner
- Mark Ryder as Greg Cowen
- Killian Scott as Ronnie Matthews
- Phillip Taggart as Gordon Blair
- Diarmuid Noyes as Brian Young
- Andrew Simpson as Colin "Getty" Getgood
- Ryan McParland as Fangs
- Kerr Logan as Feargal Sharkey
- Demetri Goritsas as Paul McNally
- Chris Patrick-Simpson as Wolfgang Zorrer
- James Tolcher as Gang Member
- Paul Caddell as Ned
- John Travers as Mutt
- Niall Wright as Mickey Bradley
- Una Carroll as Mrs Sharkey (as Una Caryll)
- Dorian Dixon as Sazafrazz Bods
- Mark Asante as Soldier
- Niketa Ferguson as Beautiful German Girl
- Robert Render as Roaring Executive
- Mary Lindsay as Marilyn
- Steven Donnelly as Rural Punker
- Emma Ryan as Girl
- Joseph Donnelly as Rural Hall Manager

== Release ==
Good Vibrations was released on 29 March 2013, following showings at various film festivals.

== Reception ==
Q magazine rated the film 5/5, while The Observer, The Guardian, The Independent and Time Out all gave 4/5 reviews, with much praise for Dormer's performance as Hooley. Observer film critic Mark Kermode described the film as "an absolute humdinger with real heart and soul" and later described how he was twice moved to tears watching it. Kermode subsequently named it the best film of 2013.

On Rotten Tomatoes the film has an approval rating of 94% based on reviews from 36 critics with an average rating of 6.9/10.

== Accolades ==
The film was the winner of both the Galway Film Fleadh Audience Award and The Belfast Film Festival Audience Award and was nominated for three Irish Film and Television Awards including Best Film, Best Actor for Richard Dormer, and Costume for Maggie Donnelly, winning Best Costume. The film received the award for best script at the 2012 Dinard Festival. The screenplay of Good Vibrations received a BAFTA nomination.

== Music ==
Much of the music is provided by bands released by the Good Vibrations label, such as "Big Time", "I Spy" and "The Pressure's On" by Rudi, "Self Conscious Over You", "Justa Nother Teenage Rebel" and "You're A Disease" by The Outcasts and "Teenage Kicks" by The Undertones, as well as Stiff Little Fingers, another Northern Irish punk band around at the same time but not released by the label. The soundtrack also includes songs by The Shangri-Las, Small Faces, David Bowie, Hank Williams and Suicide, among others.
