= Ruefrex =

Musical groups from Belfast

Ruefrex, originally called Roofwrecks, were a punk rock band from Belfast, Northern Ireland, formed in 1977.

== History ==
The band was formed in 1977 by Paul Burgess and Tom Coulter at the Boys' Model School in Belfast, Coulter originally acting as vocalist but sticking to bass when Ivan Kelly joined. Kelly left in 1979 to join London band The Wall, and was replaced by Allan Clarke. By the time of their first release, "One By One" on Terri Hooley's Good Vibrations label, they had also been joined by guitarist Jackie Forgie. They had two hits on the UK Independent Chart, "Capital Letters", which reached number 31, and "Wild Colonial Boy" which reached number 46.

They released their debut album, Flowers for all Occasions, on Kasper Records in 1985. It received a five-star review from Sounds, with Roger Holland describing it as a "positively heroic album".

They were notable for their anti-sectarian stance at a time when the Troubles were at their height in Northern Ireland. A later line-up of the band featured Gordy Blair who also performed with Highway Star, the band that was to become Stiff Little Fingers. In 1976 he joined Belfast punk band Rudi. Forgie joined Colenso Parade and later formed the Black Taxi Ballads.

== Discography ==
=== One By One (EP) ===
Recorded at Wizard Studio's, Belfast. Released: Good Vibrations [GOT 8] 1979.

Tracks:

1. One by One
2. Cross the Line
3. Don't Panic

Line Up:

- Alan Clarke - Vocals
- Jackie Forgie - Guitar
- Tom Coulter - Bass
- Paul Burgess - Drums

=== Capital Letters/April Fool (7 inch) ===
Recorded at Downtown Radio Studio, Newtownards. (Taken from Downtown Radio session master March 1980) Released: Kabuki Records [KAR 7] 1983.

Line Up:

- Alan Clarke - Vocals
- Jackie Forgie - Guitar
- Tom Coulter - Bass
- Paul Burgess - Drums

=== Paid In Kind/Perfect Crime (7 inch) ===
Released: One to One Records [1X1] 1984. Produced, Engineered and Directed by Ruefrex and Keith McCormick. Recorded at Unknown. ('The Perfect Crime' from Downtown Radio session, March 1980)

Line Up:

- Alan Clarke - Vocals
- Gary Ferris - Guitar
- Tom Coulter - Bass
- Paul Burgess - Drums

=== Wild Colonial Boy (Parts 1 and 2) (7 inch) ===
Recorded at Unknown. Produced by Hugh Matier with Ruefrex. Released: Kasper [KAT 1] 1985.

Line Up:

- Alan Clarke - Vocals
- Jackie Forgie - Guitar
- Gary Ferris - Guitar
- Tom Coulter - Bass
- Paul Burgess - Drums

=== Wild Colonial Boy/Even In The Dark Hours (7 inch) ===
Recorded at Unknown. Produced by Mick Glossop.

Released: Kasper [KAS 3] 1986.

Line Up:

- Alan Clarke - Vocals
- Jackie Forgie - Guitar
- Gary Ferris - Guitar
- Gordy Blair - Bass
- Paul Burgess - Drums

=== In The Traps/Lenders Of The Last Resort (7 inch) ===
Recorded at Unknown. Produced by Mick Glossop. Released: Kasper [KAS 3] 1986.

Line Up:

- Alan Clarke - Vocals
- Jackie Forgie - Guitar
- Gary Ferris - Guitar
- Gordy Blair - Bass
- Paul Burgess - Drums

=== Wild Colonial Boy (Extended Version)/Even In The Dark Hours (12 inch) ===
Released: Kasper [12KAS 2] 1985.

Line Up:

- Alan Clarke - Vocals
- Jackie Forgie - Guitar
- Gary Ferris - Guitar
- Gordy Blair - Bass
- Paul Burgess - Drums

=== In The Traps/Lenders Of The Last Resort (12 inch) ===
Recorded at Unknown. Produced by Mick Glossop. Released: Kasper Records [12KAS3] 1986.

Line Up:

- Alan Clarke - Vocals
- Jackie Forgie - Guitar
- Gary Ferris - Guitar
- Gordy Blair - Bass
- Paul Burgess - Drums

=== Flowers For All Occasions (LP) ===
Recorded at Music Works, London, N7. (16th - 29th Oct 1985) Mixed at Sarm West. (4th - 8th Nov 1985) Produced by Mick Glossop. Released: Kasper [KATLP 1] 1985.

Tracks

1. The Wild Colonial Boy
2. In the Traps
3. The Ruah
4. Mr Renfield Reflects
5. Correct Your Fireside Manner
6. The Sources of the Energies
7. By the Shadowline
8. Paid in Kind
9. Even in the Dark Hours
10. One by One
11. Flowers for all Occasions.

Line Up:

- Alan Clarke - Vocals
- Jackie Forgie - Guitar
- Gary Ferris - Guitar
- Gordy Blair - Bass
- Paul Burgess - Drums

=== Flowers For All Occasions (LP) ===
Released: MCA Records [MCA 5733 - USA Issue] 1985.

=== Political Wings (LP) ===
Recorded live at The Chocolate Factory, South London. Produced by Paul Burgess. Released: Flicknife [BLUNT 041] 1987.

Tracks:

1. Political Wings
2. On Kingsmill Road
3. Playing Cards with Dead Man
4. Days of Heaven
5. Playing Adult Games

Line Up:

- Alan Clarke - Vocals
- Jackie Forgie - Guitar
- Gary Ferris - Guitar
- Gordy Blair - Bass
- Paul Burgess - Drums

=== Flowers For All Occasions (CD) ===
This CD was re-issued to celebrate the band's reunion in August 2003. Only 100 copies were made. Most were distributed among fans, the remainder were sold by mail order. The release was a replica of the original but with a lyric sheet.

'Capital Letters- The Best of Ruefrex' (CD)

More recently, Cherry Red Records revealed that the official release date for the album 'Capital Letters.... the best of..' was October 17, 2006. This CD includes previously unreleased material.

Tracks are - One by One/Don't Panic/Capital Letters/April Fool/Perfect Crime/The Wild Colonial Boy Pt 1/Correct Your Fireside Manner/Even In Ihe Dark Hours/Paid In Kind/By The Shadowline/The Wild Colonial Boy/In The Traps/Flowers For All Occasions/The Lenders Of The Last Resort/Days Of Heaven/Playing Adult Games/The Fightin' 36th/Between Having And Wanting/Playing Cards With Dead Men/Middle-Ground
