= Gordon Blair =

Gordon Blair may refer to:

- Gordon Blair (musician) (born 1958), Northern Irish musician
- Gordon Blair (politician) (1919–2006), Canadian lawyer, politician and judge
- Gordon Blair (computer scientist), British computer scientist
