= Protex =

Punk band from Northern Ireland

- Origin: Belfast, Northern Ireland, United Kingdom
- Genre: Punk
- Years active: 1978−1981, 2010−present
- Labels: Punkerama Records, Good Vibrations, Rough Trade, Polydor, Sing Sing Records
- Members: Aidan Murtagh; Norman Boyd; Gordie Walker; John Rossi
- Past members: Paul Maxwell; Owen McFadden; Andrew Curliss

Protex are a Belfast punk band which formed in 1978. Their first records were issued on Good Vibrations records. They formed part of the first wave of Belfast punk bands along with label-mates The Undertones and Rudi. The original line-up was Paul Maxwell (bass/vocals), Owen McFadden (drums), David McMaster (guitar/vocals), Aidan Murtagh (guitar/vocals).

Protex formed in 1978, inspired by the band members experiencing first-hand The Clash’s landmark visit to Belfast in 1977, when their gig was cancelled at the last minute due to insurance problems. The Clash’s Belfast visit in 1977 is considered by many, including Good Vibrations' Terri Hooley, to be the catalyst for the punk movement in Northern Ireland. Protex was influenced by The Clash and took their original name, Protex Blue, from an album track on The Clash's eponymous debut album. The band did not realise the Clash song was about condoms.

Protex's debut live performance was in 1978 at Knock Methodist Church Hall in Belfast. Shortly after the show they shortened their name to Protex to avoid any confusion about being a blues band. They performed around Belfast and eventually secured a radio session with local station Downtown Radio. By regular gigging around the city the band soon came to the attention of Terri Hooley who they initially met at a gig at the Glenmachan Hotel in Belfast. Hooley prompted them to record a three track debut 45 which he released on his Good Vibrations record label in November 1978 as issue GOT6. The Belfast label had previously released singles by Rudi, Victim, The Outcasts and The Undertones. The single was later re-released on London-based Rough Trade Records.

Following good reviews from the NME writer Tony Parsons, and more radio air play the band secured a BBC Radio 1 session for the Kid Jensen show. This led to interest from Polydor Records who signed the band. The band were all still in sixth form at school when A&R men came over from London to see them play live at Chester’s in Portrush. At Easter 1979, Protex went to London to record their debut single for Polydor, "I Can't Cope".

Protex landed a UK support slot on an Adam and the Ants UK tour. The band members then moved to London and set up base at the Chessington house, once the residence of Genesis and the Boomtown Rats. "I Can Only Dream" was the next single released by Polydor. It was produced by Chas Chandler. Protex opened for the Boomtown Rats on their UK tour and on further tours in America and Canada in 1980. Three songs from the band's New York City concert at the Hurrah Club were filmed by John T Davis and made into a short film entitled Shellshock Rock. Protex's final release for Polydor was the single "A Place In Your Heart", after which they were dropped by the label. The band did farewell shows at the Pound Club in Belfast before splitting in 1981.

In 2010, New York label Sing Sing Records unearthed unreleased Polydor recordings for an album that never happened, and released them on vinyl as Strange Obsessions. This prompted renewed interest in the band. Original members Aidan Murtagh and David McMaster reformed the band with new members Norman Boyd on bass and Gordie Walker on drums. However, prior to Norman Boyd's addition in 2013, the reformed Protex played for a period of three years with the line up of Aidan Murtagh (vocals, guitar), David McMaster (guitar, vocals), Gordie Walker (drums) and Andrew Curliss (bass, vocals). This lineup completed two short tours in Spain and Japan in 2013. A live album was released following the latter Japan tour. Although having played on this album, for unknown reasons Andrew Curliss was never credited on the CD. In 2017, the band's current line-up was completed with the addition of Nine Lies bassist John Rossi.
