= Good Vibrations (record label) =

Northern Irish record label; Belfast record store

Good Vibrations was a Belfast record label and store. Founded by Terri Hooley in the early 1970s, Good Vibrations started out in a small derelict building on Great Victoria Street, Belfast.

== Beginnings ==
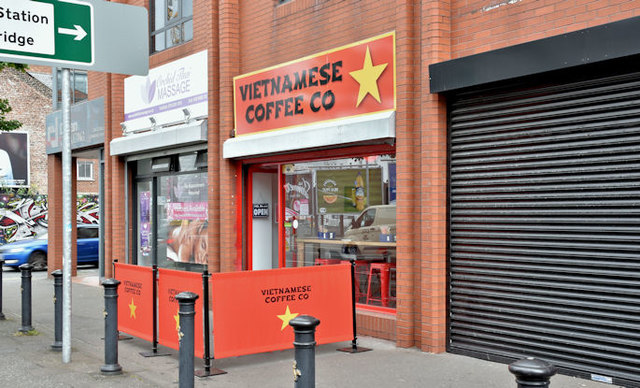
102 Gt Victoria Street in 2017 now occupied by a coffee shop — the windowframes are unchanged.

Terri was persuaded by a shop regular, Gordy Owens, to see local punk bands Rudi and the Outcasts play at The Pound, a local music venue, on 12 January 1978. "Rudi took to the stage and they blew my mind. From the moment the first chords were played I was completely in love with them – hook, line and sinker."

Terri promptly approached Rudi proposing that they work together to release a record. The initial plan was to release a flexi-disc that would be distributed with local punk fanzine Alternative Ulster. The cost of producing a vinyl record was only marginally more expensive than a flexi-disc, so the decision was taken that "Big Time" would be released as a vinyl single. "Big Time" was released in April 1978 and the Good Vibrations record label was born. It was the first record on the label with 3,000 copies being pressed. Shortly after its release, John Peel played "Big Time" on his Radio One show. The single sold well but there were no offers of contracts from the major record labels. Good Vibrations repressed and re-released the single in October 1979.

It wasn't just Rudi that won over Terri Hooley, he was inspired by the wider emerging Belfast punk scene: "I loved the energy and I loved the fact that these kids didn't give a shit about the cops and were prepared to take them on. Punk was anarchy, and I had been waiting for it all my life". He also loved that "At a time when the religious divide in Northern Ireland was most pronounced, we had kids from both sides of the community coming together in the name of music and there was rarely any trouble".

== Later ==
Hooley went on to sign and release groups such as The Undertones, Rudi, The Outcasts, Protex, Victim, Ruefrex, The Tearjerkers, The Moondogs, The Shapes, among others such as Shock Treatment and The Lids, whom he signed and recorded but did not release due to financial limitations.

Good Vibrations also staged gigs featuring local punk bands. The 'Battle of the Bands' gig held at the McMordie hall at Queens University Belfast on 14 June 1978 featured seven local acts including The Undertones, Rudi and The Outcasts. Good Vibrations was closely linked to the punk scene at the Harp Bar when it become a regular venue for punk bands in 1978.

Despite the fall out that led to Rudi leaving the label, Brian Young is clear about Terri Hooley and Good Vibration's contribution to the punk movement in Northern Ireland: "His importance can't be overestimated. He encouraged people. He was a great ideas man. Before that, people just laughed at you – "stupid kids, you'll grow out of it". But he took us seriously ... And he had enthusiasm. He wasn't in it for any cynical motive. He had the contacts, the knowledge and the experience to go ahead and do it".

Good Vibrations hosted the first International Festival of Punk and New Wave at the Ulster Hall in Belfast over two nights in 1980 featuring almost the entire roster of the label's bands and other punk acts such as The Saints.

== The Undertones ==
Of all the Good Vibrations acts, the most famous were The Undertones. Hooley was unsure at first, whether or not he should sign them. "I wasn't sure about them because nobody liked them. People crossed the road just to spit at Feargal Sharkey." On the morning after the 'Battle of the Bands' gig, The Undertones recorded “Teenage Kicks” for the Good Vibrations label. "I really believed in this record and so I decided that the best way to get it out there was to go straight to the lion's den – to London, the world capital of music, the theatre of dreams. I thought that if I personally did the rounds at the major labels and distributors that they would have to listen and they would see just how amazing this record was. And so, with a bag full of ‘Teenage Kicks’, I was off to London". None of the major record companies showed any interest in The Undertones or "Teenage Kicks". As a last resort, Terri left a few copies of the single at the BBC for the attention of John Peel. On 12 September 1978, John Peel played "Teenage Kicks" on his Radio One show and then announced "I tell you what, you know, I've not done this for ages but I think we ought to hear that again". It was the first time in the BBC's history that a record had been played twice in a row. Soon after, The Undertones signed to Sire Records.

Back in 1978, prior to recording "Teenage Kicks" on Good Vibrations, The Undertones were seriously considering breaking up, disillusioned by the lack of interest from major labels. The release of the record on Good Vibrations took The Undertones from the verge of calling it a day to a big label deal and a series of best selling singles and albums.

Good Vibrations never made any money out of The Undertones or "Teenage Kicks". "When I signed the rights over to Sire, all I asked for was £500, an autographed picture of the Shangri-Las and a few albums".

== Appearance in the media ==
The independent documentary film Shellshock Rock on the punk scene in Northern Ireland, filmed in 1979, has clips of many of the groups who recorded for Good Vibrations playing live including The Undertones, Rudi, Protex, The Outcasts, the Idiots, Victim and Rhesus Negative. The film also has an interview with Terri Hooley in the Good Vibrations shop.

BBC2's Something Else broadcast in January 1980 had a feature on the punk scene in Belfast including live sets from The Undertones and Rudi. The Undertones had by this time released and charted with five singles and a debut album. Rudi's performance of "The Pressure's On" and "Who? You!" on Something Else captures the group at their best performing two of their top tracks. The TV appearance was supposed to coincide with the release of the two tracks as a single on Good Vibrations. The tracks had been recorded at the end of December but Good Vibrations failed to release the single. An important opportunity was missed. "The show came and went to universal acclaim but the single never appeared … and to this day I still don't know why not! We split for good from the label in disgust"

== Closures ==
Despite growing popularity, Good Vibrations filed for bankruptcy in 1982. "The label was a ramshackle enterprise with no band ever signing a contract, everything being left to mutual trust ... In keeping with the punk ethos, everything was done on the cheap. Practically all the singles were recorded at Wizard Studios in Belfast. The picture covers for the singles were run off on a photocopier and duly folded into poster sleeves, usually by the bands themselves. Everything was done on a shoestring".

The Good Vibrations label may have ended in financial collapse only a few years after it was launched, and along the way there were missed opportunities, but there is no denying the importance of Good Vibrations/Terri Hooley to the Northern Ireland punk scene. "When punk rock arrived, it gladdened his old hippy heart and his keen sense of anarchy. In 1978, he released 'Big Time', 'Teenage Kicks' and a stack of lesser classics. He made us famous for something outside the usual agenda. And because he was such a rubbish businessman, he was bankrupt by 1982".

Although the original Good Vibrations shop on Great Victoria Street in Belfast had closed, Hooley's friends later got him a shop called Vintage Records, Co. just around the corner. As Good Vibrations he reopened in 1984, closed in 1991, reopened in 1992, closed in 2004 and reopened in 2005. Due to ill health, Hooley closed the shop for the final time on 13 June 2015.

== Discography ==
=== Albums ===
- BIG1 The Outcasts – Self Conscious Over You LP
- BIG2 V/A – Ulster on a Thin Wire LP (Unreleased)
- BIG3 The Nerves – Notre Demo LP
- BIG4 Protex – Listening In LP (Release originally cancelled, finally issued in 2001)
- BIG5 Terminus 5 ( Belfast band) LP "The Killer breed"

=== Singles ===
- GOT1 Rudi – "Big Time" / "No. One" 7" (Pink or white wraparound sleeve, 3000 pressed)
- GOT2 Victim – "Strange Thing By Night" / "Mixed Up World" 7" (Pink wraparound sleeve)
- GOT3 The Outcasts – "Justa Nother Teenage Rebel" / "Love Is For Sops" 7" (White wraparound sleeve)
- GOT4 The Undertones – "Teenage Kicks" 7" (4 track EP, most in white wraparound sleeve, also very rare yellow, green, pink & blue sleeves. Reissued several times, firstly on Sire)
- GOT5 Xdreamysts – "Right Way Home" / "Dance Away Lover" 7" (White wraparound sleeve)
- GOT6 Protex – "Don't Ring Me Up" / "(Just Want) Your Attention" / "Listening" in 7" (Wraparound sleeve, reissued as RT/GOT1)
- GOT7 V/A – Battle of the Bands 7" (2 x 7" in orange gatefold sleeve. Rudi, The Outcasts, The Idiots, Spider)
- GOT8 Ruefrex – "One By One" / "Cross The Line" / "Don't Panic" 7" (White wraparound sleeve)
- GOT9 The Tearjerkers – "Love Affair" / "Bus Stop" 7" (White wraparound sleeve)
- GOT10 The Moondogs – "She's Nineteen" / "Ya Don't Do Ya" 7" (White wraparound sleeve)
- GOT11 Tee Vees – "Doctor Headlove" / "War Machine" 7"
- GOT12 Rudi – I Spy 7" (4 track EP)
- GOT13 The Shapes – "Blast Off" / "Airline Disasters" 7"
- GOT14 PBR – Streetgang "The Big Day" 7" (1-sided flexi-disc)
- GOT15 Andy White – "Six String Street" / "Travelling Circus" 7" (Also 12")
- GOT16 Cruella De Ville – "Drunken Uncle John" / "Those Two Dreadful Children" 7"
- GOT17 The Outcasts – "Self Conscious Over You" / "Love You For Never" 7"
- GOT18 The Bank Robbers – "On My Mind" / "All Night" 7"
- GOT20 Rain Saints – "Caroline" 7"
- GOT21 Four Idle Hands – "99 Streets" / "Friday Man" 7"
- GOT22 PBR – Streetgang "Get Down (Before You Fall)" / "Come Alive For Me" 7"
- GOT23 Tiberius' Minnows – "Time Flies" / "Cuckoo" 7"
- GOT24 Four Idle Hands – Four Idle Hands EP 12" (4 track EP)
- GOT25 Glam Slam – "The Leader" EP 7"
- GOT26 Preacher John – "The Mountain" 12"
- GOT28 Tiberius' Minnows – "Oh June" / "The Way I Feel" 7"
- GOT29 The Beekeepers – Howl EP 12" (4 track EP)
- GOT30 PBR – Streetgang "This City" / "Talking To You" 7"
- GOT31 The Mighty Fall – "Kick It in the Head" 7"
- GOT32 Ten Wheels For Jesus – "Everybody's Making Money (Out of Me)" / "I Gave Up Waiting" 7"
- GOT33 Heat The Beans – "Hallucinate" 7"
- GOT34 Tiberius' Minnows – The Love EP CDS
- GOT36 Payola – Stick 2 Fingers Up EP CDS
- GOT37 Twinkle – Aphyd EP CDS
- GVI GOT1 The Bears – "Insane" / "Decisions" 7" (Wraparound sleeve)
- GVI GOT2 The Jets – "Original Terminal" / "Block 4" / "The Iceburn" 7"
- GVI GOT3 Static Routines – "Rock 'n' Roll Clones" / "Sheet Music" 7"
- GVI GOT5 Strange Movements – "Dancing in the Ghetto" / "Amuse Yourself" 7"
- GVI GOT6 Zebra – "Repression" / "931" 12"

== Film adaptation ==
A film adaptation based on Terri Hooley's life called Good Vibrations was released in 2013. It is directed by Lisa Barros D'Sa and Glenn Leyburn. Jodie Whittaker and Dylan Moran are among the cast.

The film was later adapted into an off-broadway musical of the same name, which features a live band as part of the cast, playing songs from several Good Vibrations artists.

== See also ==
- Lists of record labels
