= Paul Maxwell (disambiguation) =

Paul Maxwell was an actor.

Paul Maxwell may also refer to:

- Paul Maxwell (murder victim)
- Paul Maxwell, singer in The Tearjerkers
- Paul Maxwell, character in An American Girl: Chrissa Stands Strong
