= Tim Kindberg =

Computer scientist

Tim Kindberg is a computer scientist, notable for being co-author (together with George Coulouris, Jean Dollimore and Gordon Blair) of one of the standard distributed computer systems textbooks, Distributed Systems (ISBN 978-0132143011). Kindberg has been cited over 10,000 times.

== Selected research ==
- Kindberg, Tim, and John Barton. "A web-based nomadic computing system." Computer Networks 35.4 (2001): 443–456.
- Kindberg, Tim, et al. "People, places, things: Web presence for the real world." Mobile Networks and Applications 7.5 (2002): 365–376.
- Kindberg, Tim, and Armando Fox. "System software for ubiquitous computing." IEEE pervasive computing 1.1 (2002): 70–81.
- Kindberg, Tim, et al. "The ubiquitous camera: An in-depth study of camera phone use." IEEE Pervasive Computing 4.2 (2005): 42–50.
