= The Mighty Shamrocks =

The Mighty Shamrocks is a band formed in 1979 from the duo of Derry-born songwriter/guitarist Mickey Stephens and guitarist Dougie Gough.

Stephens and Gough recorded some demos of their original songs with producer Mudd Wallace at Homestead Studios. Bass player Roe Butcher and drummer Paddy McNicholl joined the band and their demo tapes soon got the attention of Terri Hooley. Hooley signed the band to Good Vibrations and asked them to record an album for Good Vibrations. The band began recording with Mudd Wallace in 1980 and the sessions continued for two years. The music they developed in the studio blended country with punk and jazz influences, a style that was unusual for a Northern Irish scene dominated by urban punk bands like The Outcasts, Stiff Little Fingers and The Undertones.

The Shamrocks played on an episode of BBC Television's "Rock Goes to College" with the Undertones at Queen's University Belfast. They also played concerts with Elvis Costello at the National Stadium in Dublin and with Joe Cocker, Dave Edmunds and Nick Lowe at the Ulster Hall. For the most part, however, the Shamrocks played obscure clubs and bars in Northern Ireland at the height of the Troubles and during the Hunger Strike of 1981. As many bars and venues closed down during the Troubles, Northern Irish bands had to endure the paranoia and fear of entering "No-Go" areas like the Bogside in Derry to play in the remaining bars and clubs.

In 1981 the Shamrocks' single "Condor Woman"/"Stand Up In Public" was released on Strong Records.

In 1982 the album, under the working title "Potatoes Are a Virtue" was completed just as Good Vibrations had filed for bankruptcy. Terri Hooley tried to interest English and American labels such as EG and Warner Brothers in the album without success. Although the Shamrocks album was not released officially until nearly thirty years later, bootleg copies circulated on the Irish music scene in the '80's and '90's. The album took on a cult status and influenced Irish artists like Energy Orchard's Bap Kennedy, who called the Shamrocks his favorite Irish band and credited Mickey Stephens as an influence on his songwriting.

Eventually the analog master tapes of the album were lost, but in 2011 a digital copy resurfaced and the album was finally released on Good Vibrations. The album was titled "Paddy" in honor of the Shamrocks' drummer Paddy McNicholl who died before the album was released. The Mighty Shamrocks toured Ireland in support of the release with Paddy's son Sam McNicholl on drums. The album received a five star review from Gavin Martin in Uncut Magazine and was hailed as a lost masterpiece of roots Americana in No Depression and PopMatters.
