= Something Else (TV series) =

British television series

- Country of origin: United Kingdom

Original release
- Network: BBC2
- Release: 1978 – 1982

Something Else is a former television show, produced by the British Broadcasting Corporation (BBC) and scheduled on its BBC2 channel between 1978 and 1982, targeted specifically at a youth audience.

== History and description ==
Something Else began in 1978 on Saturday evenings. It is an early example in British television of so-called Youth TV (sometimes derided as Yoof TV), encompassing unknown and largely untrained young presenters with undisguised regional accents, minimal scripting, a magazine format, and free-form discussion of contemporary concerns to young people, interspersed with performances by up-and-coming new bands.

The programme's innovative presentation style influenced subsequent shows in the genre such as The Tube, Oxford Road Show, Network 7 and The Word. It was also satirised by Not the Nine O'Clock News (as Hey Wow), which began that same autumn, and also in The Young Ones (as Nozin' Aroun').

During its run, it captured on film The Clash performing "Clash City Rockers" and "Tommy Gun" in 1978, in their only televised performance for the BBC; the last (and only nationally broadcast) television appearance by Joy Division, playing "Transmission" and "She's Lost Control" live in the studio in September 1979; The Jam (on the same episode) playing "Eton Rifles"; and U2 featured in May 1982 performing a three-song set consisting of "Rejoice", "I Will Follow" and "With a Shout (Jerusalem)", promoting their second L.P., 'October'.

=== Guests ===
- 1978-03-11 The Clash
- 1979-09-15 The Jam / Joy Division / John Cooper Clarke (in Manchester)
- 1979-10-06 The Specials / Linton Kwesi Johnson
- 1979-11-03 Siouxsie and the Banshees
- 1979-12-22 The Skids / The Revillos
- 1979-12-01 Rudi / The Undertones
- 1980-05-24 Secret Affair / Sad Café
- 1980-11-10 Dexy's Midnight Runners / Regulators
- 1980-11-17 Young Marble Giants / The Damned
- 1980-11-24 The Specials / General Accident
- 1980-12-08 Ian Dury & The Blockheads / Sect
- 1980-12-15 Siouxsie & The Banshees / God's Toys
- 1981-01-05 Adam & The Ants / Linx
- 1981-09-25 Angelic Upstarts / Tygers of Pan Tang
- 1981-10-02 The Questions / Dolly Mixture / The Jam / Aidan Cant / Anne Clark
- 1981-10-09 The Beat / Talisman
- 1981-10-16 The Raincoats / Fay Ray
- 1981-10-23 Dodo Vision / Kirsty MacColl
- 1981-10-30 Toyah / IEYA , Thunder In The Mountain
- 1981-11-06 Orange Juice / Depeche Mode
- 1982-05-07 Steel Pulse / Clint Eastwood & General Saint
- 1982-01-01 Compilation of performances.
- 1982-04-23 Fun Boy Three
- 1982-04-30 Dr Fantasy's Devils / Blue Poland
- 1982-05-14 Jam Today / Sophisticated Boom Boom
- 1982-05-21 U2
- 1982-10-01 Birds With Ears
- 1982-10-15 Abacush / Barnes & Barnes
- 1982-10-23 Joeys
- 1982-10-25 debates
- 1982-10-27 debates
- 1982-10-28 debates
- 1982-10-29 debates
- 1982-11-05 John Cooper Clarke / Linton Kwesi Johnson / Steel
