= Cherrybomb (film) =

- Theatrical release poster
- Directed by: Lisa Barros D'Sa; Glenn Leyburn
- Written by: Daragh Carville
- Produced by: Mark Huffam; Michael Casey; Brian Kirk; Simon Bosanquet
- Starring: Rupert Grint; Kimberley Nixon; Robert Sheehan; James Nesbitt
- Cinematography: Damien Elliott
- Edited by: Nick Emerson
- Music by: David Holmes; Stephen Hilton
- Production companies: Generator Entertainment; Green Park Films; Octagon Films; Limelight Fund; Northern Ireland Screen
- Distributed by: Universal Pictures
- Release dates: 8 February 2009 (Berlinale); 23 April 2010 (United Kingdom)
- Running time: 86 minutes
- Country: United Kingdom
- Language: English
- Budget: $1 million
- Box office: $30,143

Cherrybomb is a 2009 British drama film directed by Lisa Barros D'Sa and Glenn Leyburn. It stars Rupert Grint, Kimberley Nixon, Robert Sheehan and James Nesbitt. Filming began on location in Belfast on 7 July 2008, and lasted four weeks. The film includes nudity, drinking, drugs, shop-lifting and car theft. It was released to DVD on 23 August 2010 in the United Kingdom. It premiered in the United States in September 2009 at the Los Angeles Irish Film Festival. The film's theme song is "Cherry Bomb" by The Runaways.

Cherrybomb premiered at the 2009 Berlin International Film Festival, but was initially unable to find a distributor. An online campaign by Grint's fans was credited with helping to secure a deal for distribution in the United Kingdom.

== Plot ==
Malachy McKinny is a straight-A teenager working at the Titanic Leisureplex, a sports training complex owned and run by Dave. His best friend is Luke, a drug dealer living with his drug-addicted father. The two boys find themselves entranced by Michelle, a beautiful and charismatic teen who has just moved from London to live with her father, Dave.

Luke and Malachy attempt to win Michelle's affections by outdoing each other on a wild ride of sex, drugs, vandalism, shoplifting, and fighting. However, all three teens find that they are in over their heads when they throw a party in the Titanic Leisureplex, which turns disastrous when Dave walks in to find his place trashed. Blaming Malachy, he almost beats him to death. Malachy is saved by Luke, who smacks Dave over the head with a pole. Stunned, Dave slowly turns to look at Luke, and receives a second blow to the head. While Malachy is covered in blood and bruises, he gets up and tells Luke that he does not want to leave, since Michelle is grieving for her dead father. Luke, being a "supportive" friend, stays with Malachy until the paramedics and police show up and take them in for questioning.

The ending of the film turns out to be the opening sequence to the film. Although we only see bits and pieces of the ending interrogation, the audience gets to hear of Malachy's and Luke's final words on the incident before the film cuts out.

== Cast ==
- Rupert Grint as Malachy McKinney
- Robert Sheehan as Luke
- Kimberley Nixon as Michelle
- James Nesbitt as Dave, Michelle's father
- Niamh Quinn as Donna
- Paul Kennedy as Chris
- Conor MacNeill as Fanta
- Greer Ellison as Bun
- Kat Kirk as Sharon
- Kathy Kiera Clarke as Emma
- Lalor Roddy as Smiley
- Paul Garrett as Bob
- Paul Caddell as Swimming Instructor
- Richard Orr as Uncle Joe
- Bronach Lawlor as Jessica
- Maggie Hayes as Aunt Maggie

== Reception ==
As of June 2020, the film holds a 42% approval rating on Rotten Tomatoes, based on twelve reviews with an average rating of 4.67/10.
