= Ordinary Love (film) =

2019 romantic drama film

- Theatrical release poster
- Directed by: Lisa Barros D'Sa; Glenn Leyburn
- Written by: Owen McCafferty
- Produced by: Brian J. Falconer; David Holmes; Piers Tempest
- Starring: Lesley Manville; Liam Neeson
- Cinematography: Piers McGrail
- Edited by: Nick Emerson
- Music by: David Holmes
- Production companies: Bankside Films; Out of Orbit; Canderblinks Films; Tempo Productions; Head Gear Films; BFI; Northern Ireland Screen
- Distributed by: Universal Pictures; Focus Features
- Release dates: 9 September 2019 (TIFF); 6 December 2019 (United Kingdom and Ireland)
- Running time: 92 minutes
- Countries: United Kingdom; Ireland
- Language: English
- Box office: $774,877

Ordinary Love is a 2019 romantic drama film directed by Lisa Barros D'Sa and Glenn Leyburn, from a screenplay by Owen McCafferty. It stars Liam Neeson and Lesley Manville.

It had its world premiere at the Toronto International Film Festival on 9 September 2019. It was released in the United Kingdom on 6 December 2019, by Universal Pictures and Focus Features and then in the United States on 14 February 2020 by Bleecker Street.

== Plot ==
Joan and Tom Thompson have been married for many years; they keep their house in order and go about their routine lives. There is an ease to their relationship, and a deep love which manifests itself through tenderness and humour in equal measure. Tom owns a pet goldfish that Joan does not care for. They exercise by going on a long walk through town, turning back when they reach a newly planted sapling.

One evening while showering, Joan finds a mass on her breast. She and Tom head to the hospital, where she is diagnosed with breast cancer. Joan's doctor arranges for surgery to excise the mass and surrounding lymph nodes. On the day of Joan's surgery, Tom visits the grave of their daughter, Debbie, alone. He confesses to Debbie that he is scared of being left alone without his wife.

Joan's surgery goes well, and the doctors are able to remove all physical signs of cancer. They refer Joan to an oncologist to start chemotherapy. This leads to a disagreement between Joan and Tom about the nature of being "cancer-free". Tom sees that his fish has died and cries as he flushes it down the toilet. While waiting for her chemotherapy appointment, Joan sees Debbie's primary school teacher, Peter, waiting in the lobby. The two chat, and Peter reveals he has terminal cancer. Joan's name is called, and she undergoes her first treatment of chemotherapy. The next day, she vomits heavily.

Soon after, Joan's hair begins to fall out in clumps. Tom cuts her hair short and then shaves her head with a razor. Joan forgets which medication she is supposed to take on what day, leading to a vicious argument with Tom about how cancer is destroying their marriage. Donning a wig, Joan meets with Peter at a café where they discuss their mortality. Feeling hot and silly, Joan takes her wig off. Tom meets a man smoking on a bench outside the chemotherapy clinic. A terminal cancer patient himself, the man reassures Tom that the doctors can save Joan.

Joan and Tom decide to have a romantic evening at a hotel before Joan's mastectomy. After enjoying a fancy dinner, they have sex. Tom promises to still love Joan even if she does not have breasts. Joan undergoes the mastectomy and more sessions of chemotherapy. Tom waits outside by the bench, but does not see the smoking man again. As Peter visits Joan, Tom meets Steve, Peter's husband, in the hospital cafeteria. They discuss their shared experiences around love and loss.

Some time later, Joan has undergone surgery to reconstruct her breasts using abdominal muscle tissue. She and Tom attend Peter's funeral, where Steve delivers a eulogy. After she completes her treatment, Joan and Tom go to the supermarket in preparation for Christmas. Later, they decide to invite Steve for Christmas dinner. They go on their exercise walk once more and find that the sapling has grown.

== Cast ==
- Lesley Manville as Joan Thompson
- Liam Neeson as Tom Thompson
- David Wilmot as Peter
- Amit Shah as Steve
- Nicole Pierce as Consultant Breast Radiologist

== Production ==
In April 2018, it was announced Liam Neeson and Lesley Manville had joined the cast of the film, with Lisa Barros D'Sa and Glenn Leburn directing from a screenplay by Owen McCafferty. Brian J. Falconer, David Holmes, Piers Tempest, will produce the film under their Out of Orbit, Canderblinks Films, and Tempo Productions, banners respectively. In October 2018, it was announced David Wilmot and Amit Shah had joined the cast of the film.

== Release ==
In December 2018, Bleecker Street acquired U.S. distribution rights to the film. In March 2019, Focus Features acquired UK distribution rights to the film. The film had its world premiere at the Toronto International Film Festival on 9 September 2019. It was released in the United Kingdom on 6 December 2019. It was released United States on 14 February 2020.

== Critical reception ==
Ordinary Love received positive reviews from film critics. It holds a 93% approval rating on Rotten Tomatoes, based on 113 reviews, with an average of 7.6/10. The site's critical consensus reads, "Led by strong performances from Lesley Manville and Liam Neeson, Ordinary Love wrings heartrending drama out of one couple's medical travails." On Metacritic, the film holds a rating of 70 out of 100, based on 25 critics, indicating "generally favorable reviews".
