= The Tearjerkers =

Northern Irish punk band

The Tearjerkers are a five-piece power pop band from Northern Ireland. Formed at the height of the punk rock boom in Ulster in 1978, the band were composed of members from other Northern Irish groups namely Cobra, Midnight Cruiser and The Detonators.

== History ==
Their first single was issued on Terry Hooley's Belfast punk record label, Good Vibrations. Drummer/manager, Nigel Hamilton, along with his partner, Elizabeth McCann, organised a tour for the Good Vibrations label, which took other leading punk bands Rudi and The Outcasts on tour with the Tearjerkers all over Northern Ireland. The Tearjerkers were offered a recording contract with Phonogram's Back Door label, and issued their second single, "Murder Mystery" produced by John Astley (producer of The Who and Pete Townshend's then brother in law) and Phil Chapman. This single scored minor hit status in Belgium, France and Sweden. The Tearjerkers recorded two sessions for BBC Radio One's John Peel Show, and also received extensive airplay on Belfast's Downtown Radio and RTÉ's Dave Fanning show.

With the death of the entertainment industry following The Miami Showband massacre, the Tearjerkers became prime movers in re-opening several concert venues and almost single-handedly creating the late 1970s/early 1980s contemporary band touring circuit within Northern Ireland.

The band travelled to England to start recording their follow up single, and recorded "Comic Book Heroes", "Fingers" and "Can't You See" with Chris "Merrick" Hughes (Adam and the Ants drummer) and Hugh Jones (Echo and the Bunnymen producer). These tracks were issued on the Mercury record label in the United States on the compilation album, Thru The Back Door. The Tearjerkers also record another three tracks with Laurence Juber at Radio Luxembourg's London Studios before returning to Northern Ireland where further tracks, some self-produced, were readied for their debut album (provisionally entitled 'The Grey Album')

'We'd always been influenced by black music, incredibly so, much more than we were influenced by punk rock. Its influence is like dirty great fingerprints all over our recordings if you listen for them. Fontella Bass, Motown...we'd spend hours trying to get that Stax snare sound. When it came to the album, it wasn't a purely 'white' album and definitely not a 'black' album, although heavily influenced by black acts. I suppose we were pitching it as The Temptations on amphetamines'. So that's how it got the working title' (Howard Ingram)

The Tearjerkers continued to tour relentlessly across Ireland and England on their own, or as a support act to others including Thin Lizzy, Dexys Midnight Runners, Doll by Doll and Rachel Sweet. They were ably assisted by their Roadie/Manager, Malcolm Ostermeyer

Following an incident at a press reception in Kilkenny for Thin Lizzy, it was decided that it was in the band's best interests if manager/drummer Nigel Hamilton left immediately following the tour. His replacement was Johnny Lee (ex-Blue Steam). The band recorded more demos at the behest of the label, and travelled to London to play a series of dates and headline a night in London's Venue nightclub, sponsored by the Irish Tourist Board. This tour was captured on tape, and has been released as a free mini album on the band's website. Shortly after playing one of their biggest gigs in Bundoran, County Donegal the band split up, with Paul McIlwaine, Greg Lindsay and Paul Maxwell forming a new band, Etc. Etc. Lee subsequently died of a brain haemorrhage.

Brian Rawson went to London to join Jim Lyttle (Pretty Boy Floyd, Rogue Male) in his new band, and they recorded a three track demo in Alvic Studios with Jimmy Bain (Rainbow, Dio) producing and playing bass guitar on the track, "Rough, Tough and Pretty Too". Rawson also spent some time with Brian Connolly's new incarnation of Sweet, prior to emigrating to the United States for several years. Rawson is now domiciled in Glasgow, Scotland, where he continues to play with The Brian Rawson Band.

Howard Ingram founded the Blue Rhythm Audio record label, releasing numerous projects by second wave Northern Irish bands, including the Vedettes, Sample and Hold and Shock Treatment, as well as solo recordings. Blue Rhythm operated between 1981-1983. He subsequently founded another record label that specialised in electronic music and it continues to exist today, albeit in a somewhat haphazard manner. One of Blue Rhythm's releases was the posthumous Tearjerkers single, issued under the name Paul West and His Mood (due to contractual issues), the Rawson/Maxwell penned "Where's Julie?"

Hamilton revived The Tearjerkers name to release the single "Fool" and "Comic Book Heroes" as a double A-sided single in 1982, for Dublin's Vixen label, with Brian Rawson guesting on guitar and Janine Mullally on lead vocals.

== Legacy ==
In recent years there has been a revival of interest in the band's work, with Japanese pop bands covering their music, and several invitations to tour Japan having been offered (and rejected), as well as offers to play the UK's premier punk festival, Rebellion. 'I think, fortunately, we're all in a place where we don't need or want that. It's different people living a previous life. It would require an awful lot of zeroes on the end to tempt me to pick up a posing pole again. I've no interest. I think there's something a bit sad about blokes from that era reviving their hits. Receding hairlines and expanding waistlines and some grim effort to recapture their youth. No, I've definitely no interest in strapping on a bass ever again' (Howard Ingram)

Several officially sanctioned albums have been released (in Japan) as well as a slew of top quality live bootlegs.

After almost three decades of rejecting offers for their work to be reissued, the band agreed to the US re-release of "Where's Julie" (as a vinyl single) with release anticipated towards the end of 2014/early 2015. ('There have been countless offers over the years to do something, but it's gone, it's done. I think all of us continue to create music, but it has always been a case of looking forward, not back.')

Howard Ingram, in particular, is a particularly vocal critic of the period in which they emerged. 'There's a plaque in Belfast now that champions the role the 1978 people played in putting Belfast on the international music map, and I think it's a load of crap. And I guess Eric Bell & Gary Moore (ex Thin Lizzy), Fruupp (1970s Belfast prog-rock band), Van Morrison, Derek Bell (Chieftains), Ottilie Patterson (Chris barber Jazz Band) and Ruby Murray (one of the UK's biggest female vocalists of the 1950s and the origin of the UK rhyming slang term for 'a curry') might agree with me. I just hate the whole revisionist, self-aggrandising mindset')

Also, in 2013 drummer Nigel Hamilton suffered a debilitating stroke. Nigel Hamilton died in Craigavon Area Hospital on 5 October 2020.

== Personnel ==
- Paul Maxwell (lead vocal)
- Paul McIlwaine (guitars)
- Brian Rawson (guitars, backing vocals)
- Howard Ingram (bass guitar, backing vocal and occasional lead vocal)
- Nigel Hamilton (drums)
