= Limelight (Belfast) =

Night club in Belfast, Northern Ireland

Coordinates: 54.5972°N 5.9301°W

- Interactive map of Limelight
- Address: 17 Ormeau Ave; Belfast, Northern Ireland
- Owner: MCD / Shine Productions
- Capacity: 1675

Construction
- Opened: 1987

Website
- Venue Website

Limelight is a live music and night club venue complex in Belfast, Northern Ireland, which initially opened in 1987. The complex, located on the city's Ormeau Avenue, consists of Limelight 1 & Limelight 2, as well as a bar called Katy's Bar. The outdoor terrace is called The Rock Garden.

Limelight has strong associations with new bands, homegrown talent, and indie/rock/metal club nights.

== History ==
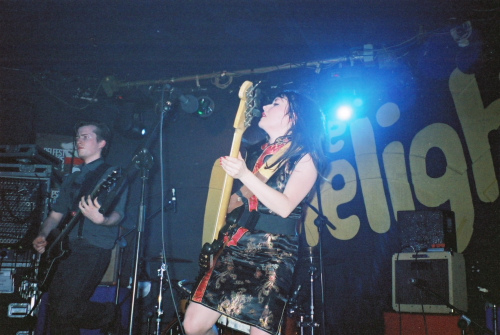
Indie rock band Sons and Daughters performing in 2005

Limelight nightclub and adjoining Dome bar were first opened in 1987 by Patrick Lennon, who had previously owned the Harp Bar in Hill Street, Belfast. Growing over the years, it eventually took over the adjoining building, which was a premises owned by a spring and airbrake business (hence the "Spring and Airbrake" venue name).

In 2010 the then owners, CDC Leisure, went into administration. In late 2011, the Limelight complex was purchased by Irish live music promoters MCD & Shine Productions.

In late 2012, following a major refurbishment, the individual bars were rebranded, with the Spring and Airbrake being renamed to Limelight 1, Katy Daly's becoming Katy's Bar and the original Limelight venue becoming known as Limelight 2.

== Notable performances ==
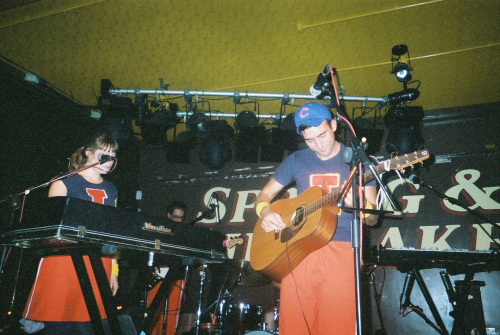
Sufjan Stevens performing at the Spring and Airbrake, 2005.

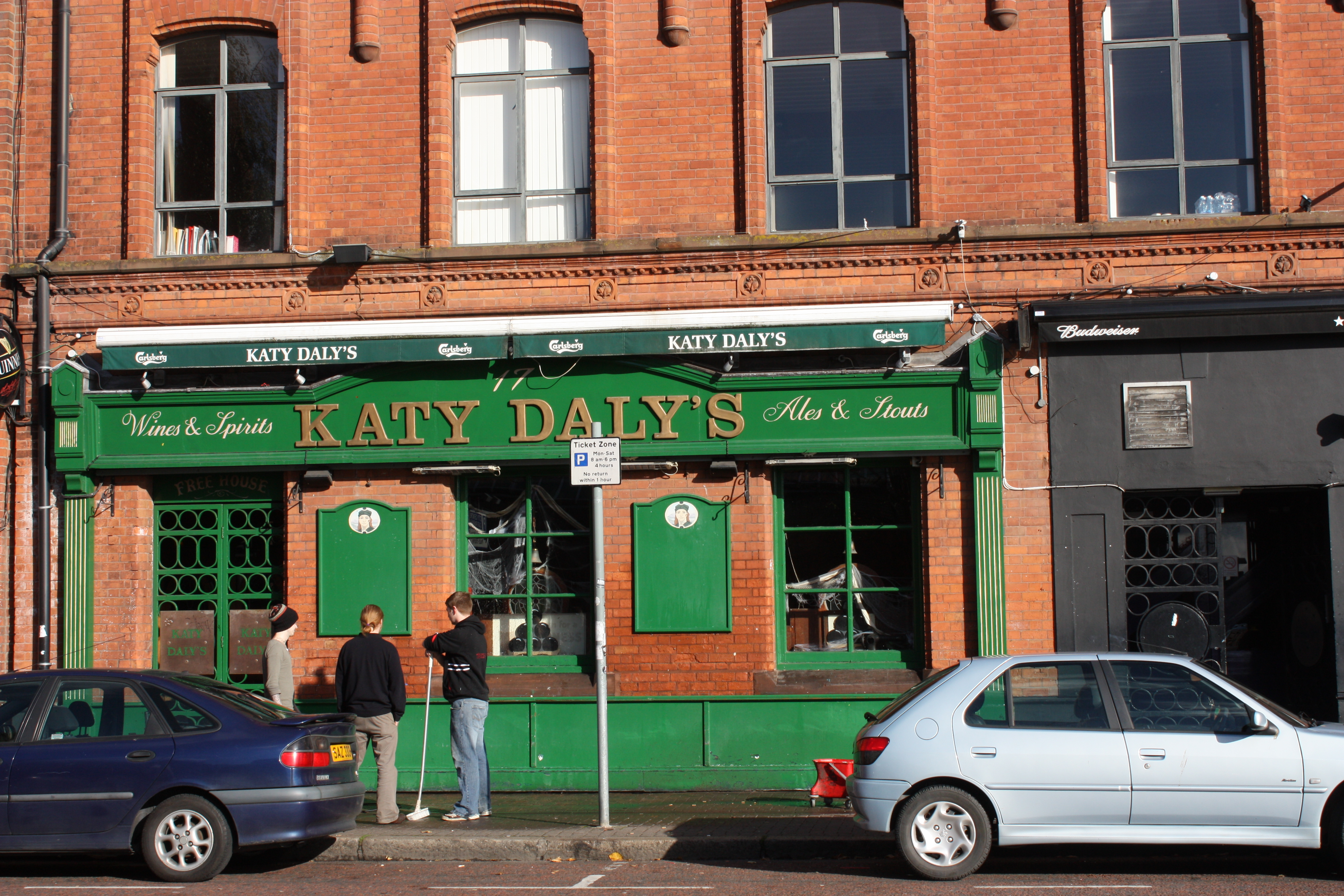
Katy Daly's in October 2010. The public entrance to The Limelight 2 is adjacent to the right.

Oasis played the venue on 4 September 1994. Noel Gallagher has commented on the venue:

Limelight is now part of our heritage. There was a great buzz when the owner Eamonn McCann informed me we had hit the No 1 spot that night in '94. I'll always remember this place with affection. We had a party that night and the audience joined in. That was the start of our success story.

Other bands that have performed at Limelight include

- Anthrax
- Arctic Monkeys
- Ash
- Biffy Clyro
- Blur
- Ian Brown
- Jeff Buckley
- The Cheese Junkies
- The Dillinger Escape Plan
- Dinosaur Jr.
- Ronnie James Dio
- DragonForce
- Dropkick Murphys
- Echo & the Bunnymen
- Fall Out Boy
- Fantômas
- Feeder
- Franz Ferdinand
- David Gray
- Interpol
- Mick Jones
- Kaiser Chiefs
- The Libertines
- Lotion
- Shane MacGowan
- Soulfly
- Manic Street Preachers
- Maxïmo Park
- Moby
- Mogwai
- Mudhoney
- Napalm Death
- New Found Glory
- NOFX
- Paolo Nutini
- Pavement
- Pop Will Eat Itself
- Placebo
- Primal Scream
- Rise Against
- Slayer
- Snow Patrol
- Steve Harley and Cockney Rebel
- Suede
- The Courteeners
- The Streets
- The Strokes
- Joe Strummer
- Tangerine Dream
- Th' Faith Healers
- Tomahawk
- The Twilight Singers
- Therapy?
- Trivium
- Paul Weller
- Melanie C
- Black Grape
- Public Enemy
- Johnny Marr
- The Undertones
- Gary Numan
