= Glenn Patterson =

Northern Irish writer

Glenn Paterson FRSL
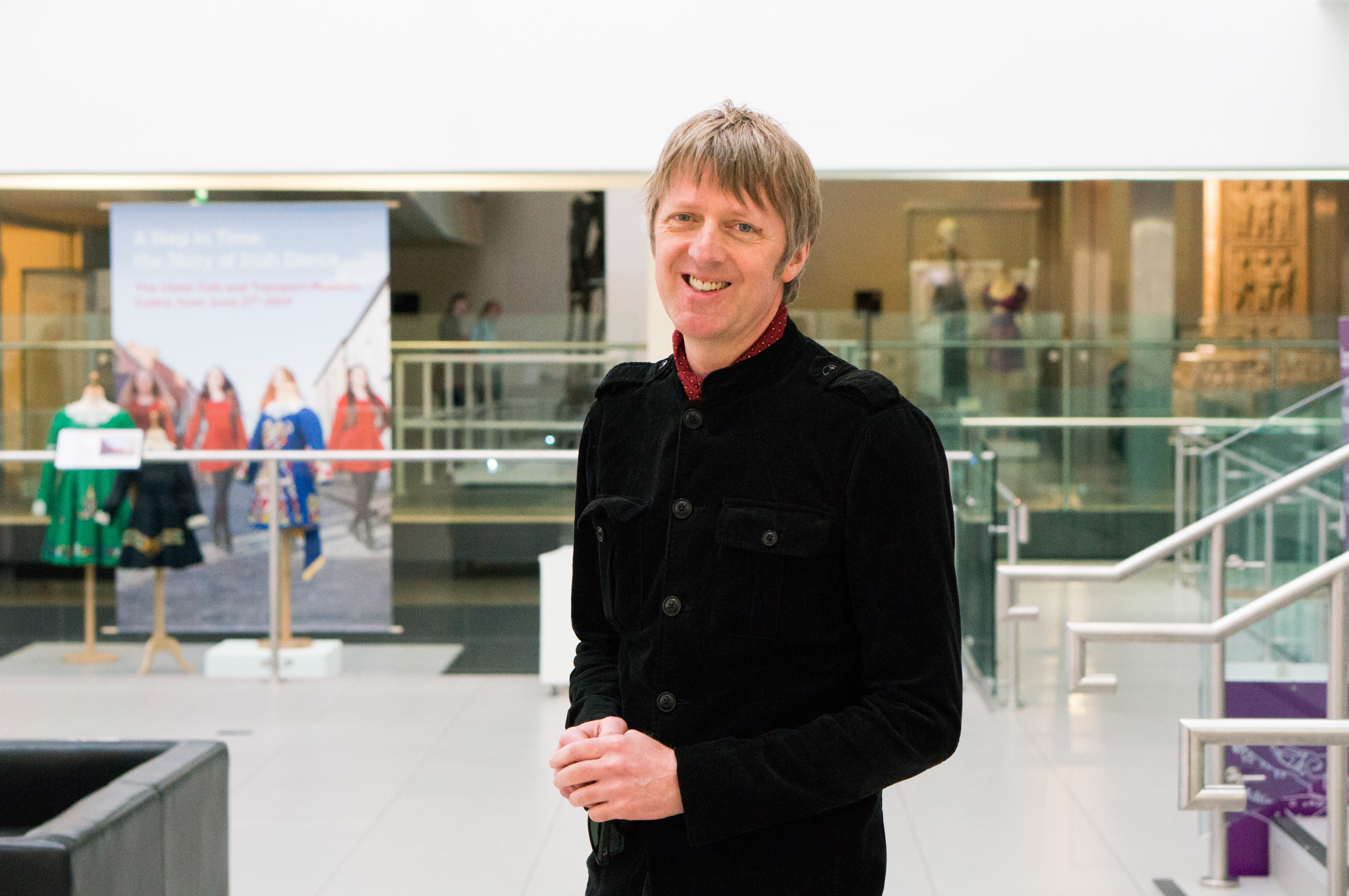
- Patterson in 2014
- Born: 1961 (age 63–64); Belfast, Northern Ireland
- Education: Methodist College, Belfast; University of East Anglia
- Notable awards: Rooney Prize for Irish Literature, Betty Trask Award

Glenn Patterson FRSL (born 1961) is a writer from Belfast, Northern Ireland, best known as a novelist. In 2023, he was elected a Fellow of the Royal Society of Literature.

== Early life ==
Patterson was born in Belfast, where he attended Methodist College Belfast. He graduated from the University of East Anglia (BA, MA), where he was a product of the UEA creative writing course under Malcolm Bradbury.

== Career ==
In addition to writing novels, Patterson also makes documentaries for the BBC, and has published his collected journalistic writings as Lapsed Protestant (2006). He has written plays for Radio 3 and Radio 4, and co-wrote with Colin Carberry the screenplay of the 2013 film Good Vibrations, about the music scene in Belfast during the late 1970s (based on the true story of Terri Hooley).

Patterson's recurring theme is the reassessment of the past. In The International, he recovers that moment in Belfast's history just before the outbreak of the Troubles, to show diverse strands of city life around a city centre hotel, essentially to make the point that the political propagandists who explain their positions through history overlook its inconvenient complexity and the possibility that things might have turned out differently.

He is currently a Professor of Creative Writing in the School of Arts, English and Literature and Director of the Seamus Heaney Centre at Queen's University Belfast.

Patterson has been a writer in residence at the University of East Anglia and the University College Cork, and was the Ireland Fund Artist-in-Residence in the Celtic Studies Department of St. Michael's College at the University of Toronto in October 2013.

== Personal life ==
He lives in Belfast with his wife, Ali Fitzgibbon, and two children.

== Bibliography ==
=== Novels ===
- Burning Your Own (London: Chatto and Windus, 1988)
- Fat Lad (London: Chatto and Windus, 1992)
- Black Night at Big Thunder Mountain (London: Chatto and Windus, 1995)
- The International (London: Anchor Books, 1999)
- Number 5 (London: Hamish Hamilton, 2003)
- That Which Was (London: Hamish Hamilton, 2004)
- The Third Party (Belfast: Blackstaff Press, 2007)
- The Mill for Grinding Old People Young (London: Faber, 2012)
- Gull (London: Head of Zeus, 2016)
- Where Are We Now? (London: Head of Zeus, 2020)

=== Non-fiction ===
- Lapsed Protestant (Dublin: New Island Books, 2006), journalistic writings
- Once Upon a Hill: Love in Troubled Times (London: Bloomsbury, 2008), memoir
- Backstop Land (London: Head of Zeus, 2019), journalistic writings

== Awards ==
- 2016 Heimbold Visiting Chair of Irish Studies
- 2014 BAFTA nomination
- 2008 Lanaan Literary Fellowship
- 2007 Elected to Aosdana
- 1988 Rooney Prize for Irish Literature
- 1988 Betty Trask Award
