= Rudi (band) =

Northern Irish band

Background information
- Origin: Belfast, Northern Ireland
- Genres: Punk rock, pop punk, power pop
- Years active: 1975–1983
- Labels: Good Vibrations, Jammed!
- Past members: Drew Brown; Leigh Carson; Graham "Grimmy" Marshall; Ronnie Matthews; Brian Young; Johnny Stewart; Gordon Blair; Drew Brown; Paul Martin

Rudi were a punk rock/power pop band from Belfast formed in 1975. Throughout the late 1970s they were one of the most popular Northern Ireland punk bands. However, while The Undertones and Stiff Little Fingers secured record deals with major labels and had chart success, Rudi did not hit the big time and became 'the band that time forgot'. Rudi split in 1982.

== History ==
=== Formation ===
Rudi formed in 1975 as a covers band, playing rock 'n' roll and glam rock hits. The original members were Drew Brown (drums), Leigh Carson, Graham "Grimmy" Marshall (bass guitar), Ronnie Matthews (guitar, lead vocals) and Brian Young (guitar, vocals). The band's name was taken from a single called "Oo Oo Rudi" by the Jook.

=== Live ===
Carson left, and after bassist Johnny Stewart joined, Marshall moved to drums and the group adopted a pop punk sound.

Rudi were the very first punk band in Belfast. "We were the first punk band in Belfast ... Then punk broke and people identified with us. You thought you were the only people who were into this stuff. You didn't realise that two streets away, two other people were reading Sounds and NME." (Brian Young, Rudi)

In the early days of punk, the band wore a stage uniform of boiler suits covered in painted punk slogans and Rudi song titles. The boilersuits had been stolen by drummer Marshall from his place of work. Original Stiff Little Fingers bassist Gordon Blair joined in 1977, replacing Stewart.

Rudi’s early live set included the crowd favourite “Cops” which started and finished with the chant of “SS RUC” and a chorus of “we hate the cops”. It was written about the “Battle of Bedford Street” - a confrontation between punks and the RUC in Belfast city centre when The Clash gig at the Ulster Hall in October 1977 was cancelled after the insurance was withdrawn. As Belfast riots go, it was small scale but it was unique in that it was a non-sectarian “riot” by Protestant and Catholic punks. “Cops” was Rudi’s most overtly political song and one of the group’s more "punky" songs.

On seeing Rudi perform at The Pound club in Belfast in January 1978, Terri Hooley the owner of Good Vibrations record shop decided to launch a record label. "Rudi took to the stage and they blew my mind. From the moment the first chords were played I was completely in love with them - hook, line and sinker."(Terri Hooley, Good Vibrations)

Rudi pioneered a distinctive Northern Ireland punk sound which Brian Young of Rudi described as “poppy punk with lots of guitar riffs and sing along choruses”.

=== Releases and broadcasts ===
The band's debut release was the "Big Time" single, the first record on Terri Hooley's Good Vibrations label, released in May 1978. It received positive reviews in the music press, and was later described by Henry McDonald of The Observer as "one of the most perfect pop songs to come out of this island".

Rudi, in their early days, played occasional gigs at different venues across Belfast, such as the Pound Club and Glenmachen Stables, but they regularly played The Harp Bar after it opened its doors to punk bands in April 1978. “Rudi was one of the first bands to get in on the act, making our Harp debut in May 1978 … we played The Harp at least once or twice a month, until it closed its doors to punk midway through 1981.”(Brian Young, Rudi)

The release of "Big Time" in May 1978 was a breakthrough moment for Rudi and punk in Belfast. It had been preceded, in February, by the very limited (500 copies) release of "Suspect Device" by Stiff Little Fingers. The success of "Big Time" was quickly followed by Good Vibrations releases by Victim, The Outcasts and then, in September, the label released "Teenage Kicks" by The Undertones.

The success of the "Big Time" single prompted Rudi to relocate to London in August 1978. Rudi were based in London just at the time when the music industry and media were finally showing some interest in the punk scene in Belfast. Rudi did get a profile through gigs and contacts in London but they failed to secure a record deal, and suffered a further setback when guitarist Matthews and drummer Marshall were jailed for a week after their Clapham squat was raided, and they returned to Belfast in December.

Rudi playing "Big Time" in January 1979, at the Glenmachen Stables, was captured on film on Shellshock Rock, an independent documentary film on the Northern Irish punk scene that was released in June of the same year.

In 1979, Rudi also contributed "Overcome by Fumes" to the Battle of the Bands EP, and were offered a record deal by Polydor, on the condition that they replaced Marshall, but the offer was declined.

The "I Spy" EP was released on Good Vibrations in July 1979. The four tracks on the EP were “I Spy”, “Genuine Reply”, “Sometimes” and “Ripped In Two”.

The band embarked on a tour of England. Blair was sacked, later joining the Outcasts, with Matthews moving to bass.

Rudi recorded a session for Northern Ireland’s Downtown Radio, which was broadcast in October 1979. The tracks recorded were “Time To Be Proud”, “Radio On”, “Claws and Clutches”, “The Pressure’s On”, “Who? You!” and “Excitement”.

A television appearance on BBC2's Something Else in 1980 showcased the band's proposed next single on Good Vibrations, "The Pressure's On" and "Who? You!". Rudi's performance recorded in December 1979 captures the group performing two of their best tracks live in front of a studio audience of young Belfast punks. The two tracks were among Rudi’s best songs but the release of the single never happened and the band left the Good Vibrations label in frustration.

The band recorded a session for Mike Read's BBC Radio 1 show The Evening Session at the end of April 1980. The tracks broadcast were “Yummy, Yummy, Yummy”, “The Pressure’s On”, “Time To Be Proud” and “Without You”. "Mike helped us a lot and we recorded a killer radio session for his show, which was easily the best thing we had done to date." (Brian Young, Rudi).

A deal with Target Records was proposed, but failed with the label's demise. They were offered a deal with Ariola Records by Pete Waterman, but instead decided to sign with the Paul Weller-funded Jamming! label.

“When I Was Dead” was released as a single by Jamming! Records in August 1981, with "Bewerewolf!” and “The Pressure’s On” on the B-side. "When I Was Dead EP is by far my fave Rudi record as it's perhaps the only one that actually sounds like a proper record - and turned out like we wanted it to!" (Brian Young, Rudi)

In September, a session was recorded for the John Peel show. The tracks broadcast were “Crimson", "Tigerland", "When I Was Dead" and "Excitement".

In November, "Crimson", "14 Steps", "Radio On" and "The Prince of Pleasure" were recorded in a session for broadcast on the Dave Fanning Show on RTE Radio 2.

At the end of 1981, the band recorded "Toytown", "Frozen By Your Touch" and "Life" for a session broadcast on BBC Radio 1's David Jensen show in December.

Crimson (with 14 Steps as the B side) was released a single in February 1982 and was named "Single of the Week" by Sounds.

Rudi supported the Jam on their 1982 Transglobal Unity Express tour. When the Jam split up, the Jamming! label folded soon afterwards. Rudi found themselves without a label, and also split up.

== Post break up ==
Matthews, Marshall and Young re-emerged with a new band, Station Superheaven. Young later formed a series of bands including the Tigersharks, the Roughnecks and the Sabrejets; in the 2000s, he played in Shame Academy along with Greg Cowan of the Outcasts and Petesy Burns of Stalag 17.

A compilation CD of Rudi's recordings was released in 1996 on the Cherry Red label Anagram.

Rudi influenced several later bands, including the Saw Doctors and Therapy?, both of whom recorded cover versions of "Big Time".

Rudi were one of the main bands at the heart of the punk movement in Belfast in the late 1970s and their early history and songs feature heavily in the film Good Vibrations, starring Richard Dormer and Jodie Whittaker, which tells the story of Terri Hooley, Good Vibrations record shop/label and punk in Belfast.

== Lineups ==
=== Original line-up (1975) ===
- Brian Young – guitar, vocals
- Ronnie Matthews – guitar, lead vocals
- Graham "Grimmy" Marshall – bass guitar
- Drew Brown – drums
- Leigh Carson

=== Second line-up ===
- Brian Young – guitar, vocals
- Ronnie Matthews – guitar, lead vocals
- Johnny Stewart – bass guitar
- Graham "Grimmy" Marshall – drums

=== Third line-up (1977–1979) ===
- Brian Young – guitar, vocals
- Ronnie Matthews – guitar, lead vocals
- Gordon Blair – bass guitar
- Graham "Grimmy" Marshall – drums

=== 1981 line-up ===
- Brian Young – guitar, vocals
- Ronnie Matthews – bass, lead vocals
- Graham "Grimmy" Marshall – drums

=== 1982 line-up ===
- Brian Young – guitar, vocals
- Ronnie Matthews – bass, lead vocals
- Graham "Grimmy" Marshall – drums
- Paul Martin – keyboards

== Discography ==
=== Singles and EPs ===
- "Big Time" (1978, Good Vibrations)
- I Spy EP (1979, Good Vibrations)
- "When I Was Dead" (1981), Jamming!) UK Indie No. 29
- "Crimson" (1982, Jamming!) UK Indie No. 23
- "The Pressure's On" (2000, Last Year's Youth Records)
- 14 Steps to Death EP (2001, Last Year's Youth Records)
- Yummy Yummy EP (2002, Last Year's Youth Records)

=== Compilation albums ===
- Big Time – The Best of Rudi (1996, Anagram Records)
- The Band That Time Forgot (2002, Last Year's Youth Records)
- The Complete Rudi Singles Collection (2002, Last Year's Youth Records)
- The Radio Sessions 1979–1981 (2005, Wizzard in Vinyl)

=== Compilation appearances ===
- "Overcome by Fumes" on Battle of the Bands 7-inch EP (1979, Good Vibrations)
