= Owen McCafferty =

Northern Irish playwright

Owen McCafferty (born 1961) is a playwright from Northern Ireland.

== Early life ==
Born in Belfast, Northern Ireland, McCafferty was brought up in London from the age of 1 until age 10, when his parents returned to Belfast. He was educated at St Augustine's Secondary School, the College of Business Studies and then the University of Ulster, where he studied Philosophy and History.

== Career ==
His play Scenes from the Big Picture, originally produced in 2003 at the National Theatre in London, earned him the John Whiting Award, the Evening Standard's Charles Wintour Award for New Playwriting and the Meyer-Whitworth Award. It was the first time any playwright had won all three awards in one year. His play ‘’Quietly’’ was voted best play at the Writers’ Guild awards in 2013.

McCafferty has also adapted J P Miller's Days of Wine and Roses but only used the basic structure of the original.

McCafferty's writing features the language and complexities, both comic and tragic, of Belfast life. Like John Millington Synge, McCafferty's dialogue is highly stylized.

McCafferty is a member of Aosdána.

== Plays ==
- I Won't Dance Don't Ask Me
- Mojo Mickybo
- Cold Comfort
- Freefalling
- Shoot the Crow
- Closing Time
- Scenes from the Big Picture
- The Absence of Women
- Titanic (Scenes from The British Wreck Commissioner's Inquiry 1912)
- Quietly
- Unfaithful
- Fire Below
- Death of a Comedian
- Agreement
- No Place Like Home
- Closing Time

== Books ==
McCafferty’s books include;

- Days of Wine and Roses
- Antigone

== Screenplays ==
- Ordinary Love (2019)

== Films based on his plays ==
- Mickybo and Me

== See also ==
- List of Northern Irish writers
