= Rupert Grint =

English actor (born 1988)

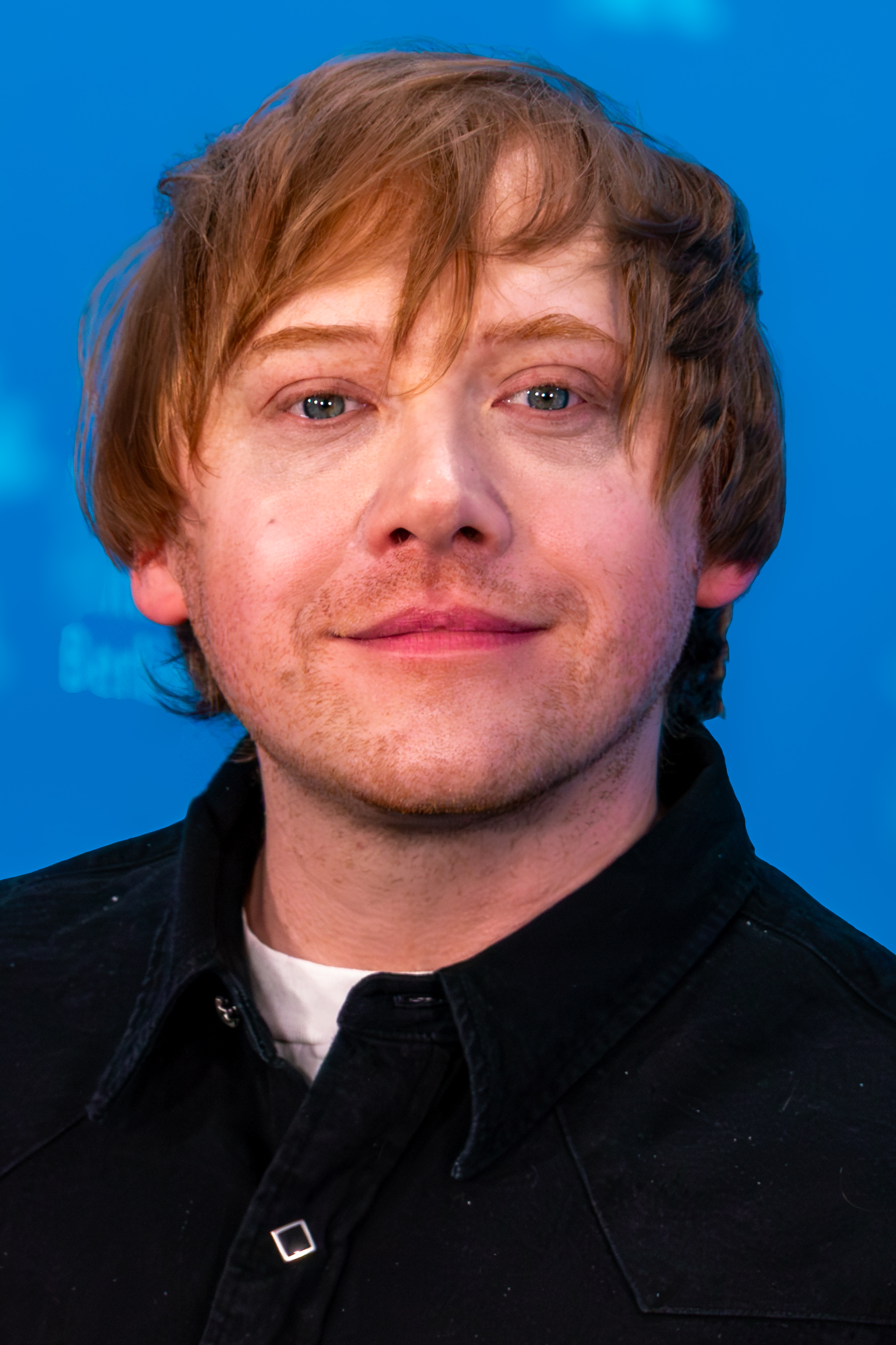
- Grint in 2026
- Born: Rupert Alexander Lloyd Grint; 24 August 1988 (age 38); Harlow, Essex, England
- Occupation: Actor
- Years active: 1999–present
- Partner: Georgia Groome (2011–present)
- Children: 2

Rupert Alexander Lloyd Grint (/ɡrɪnt/; born 24 August 1988) is an English actor. He rose to fame for his role as Ron Weasley in the Harry Potter film series, for which he was cast at age eleven, having previously acted only in school plays and his local theatre group. Grint portrayed Weasley in all eight films in the series, beginning with Harry Potter and the Philosopher's Stone (2001) and concluding with Harry Potter and the Deathly Hallows – Part 2 (2011). Since then, he has continued to work in film, television, and theatre.

Beginning in 2002, Grint began to work outside of the Harry Potter franchise, with a co-leading role in Thunderpants. He starred in the dramedy Driving Lessons (2006) and the drama Cherrybomb (2009) and co-starred in the comedy Wild Target (2010). After the Harry Potter series concluded, he appeared in the films Into the White (2012), Charlie Countryman (2013), CBGB (2013), Moonwalkers (2015), and Knock at the Cabin (2023). Grint made his stage debut in 2013 in Mojo at the Harold Pinter Theatre. He executive-produced and starred in the television series Snatch, based on the film of the same name. He has also starred in the black comedy series Sick Note, the mystery thriller miniseries The ABC Murders, and the psychological horror series Servant.

== Early life ==
Rupert Alexander Lloyd Grint was born on 24 August 1988 in Harlow, Essex, to Nigel Grint, a dealer in racing memorabilia, and Joanne Grint (née Parsons). He is the eldest of five siblings. He has said that his earliest goal in life was to become an ice cream man. He grew up in Watton-at-Stone, Hertfordshire, and was educated at Richard Hale School, in Hertford. Grint was raised a Catholic and said he "feared God" as a child.

While in school, he took an avid interest in theatre. He began performing in school productions and joined the Top Hat Stage and Screen School, a local theatre group that cast him as a fish in Noah's Ark and a donkey in a nativity play. He continued participating in school plays as he moved into secondary school. Nonetheless, he had never acted professionally prior to the Harry Potter series. He left school at sixteen to focus on his acting career, saying he "didn't really like school that much".

== Career ==
=== 1999–2011: Harry Potter and worldwide recognition ===
Starting in 1999, casting began for the film adaptation of Harry Potter and the Philosopher's Stone, the best-selling novel by J. K. Rowling. Rowling insisted the cast be British and assisted Susie Figgis and director Chris Columbus in casting the roles. Grint, a fan of the book series, chose to audition for the role of Ron Weasley, one of Harry Potter's best friends at Hogwarts. Having seen a Newsround report about the open casting, he sent in a video of himself rapping about how he wished to receive the role, and the casting team asked for a meeting with him.

In August 2000, Daniel Radcliffe, Emma Watson, and Grint were selected to play Harry, Hermione Granger, and Ron. Grint is the oldest member of the trio. The release of Harry Potter and the Philosopher's Stone in 2001 was Grint's debut screen performance. Breaking records for opening-day sales and opening-weekend takings, it was the year's highest-grossing film. With a total of US$974 million in its theatrical run, it stands as the series' second most commercially successful entry. It was critically well-received, scoring mainly positive reviews. However, a number of critics found the adaptation's faithfulness to the book both its best and worst quality. Grint won a Satellite Award in the category of Outstanding New Talent, and a Young Artist Award for Most Promising Young Newcomer.

A year later, Grint again starred as Ron in Harry Potter and the Chamber of Secrets (2002). It opened to positive reviews and critics generally enjoyed the lead actors' performances. Both Los Angeles Times and New York Magazine observed that Grint and his peers had matured between films, with the latter pointing out that Grint had become "more proficient" and said they missed "the amateurish ardour" the actor and Watson carried in Philosopher's Stone. Harry Potter and the Prisoner of Azkaban (2004) was released on 31 May in the UK. The film sees all three of its lead characters hover on the brink of adolescence, "and while they look braver and more capable than before, the dangers they face seem far more grave and their vulnerability more intense." Alfonso Cuarón took over direction for Prisoner of Azkaban, which remains the lowest-grossing Harry Potter film with US$795 million in revenue. Nonetheless, it was the second highest-grossing movie of 2004, behind Shrek 2.

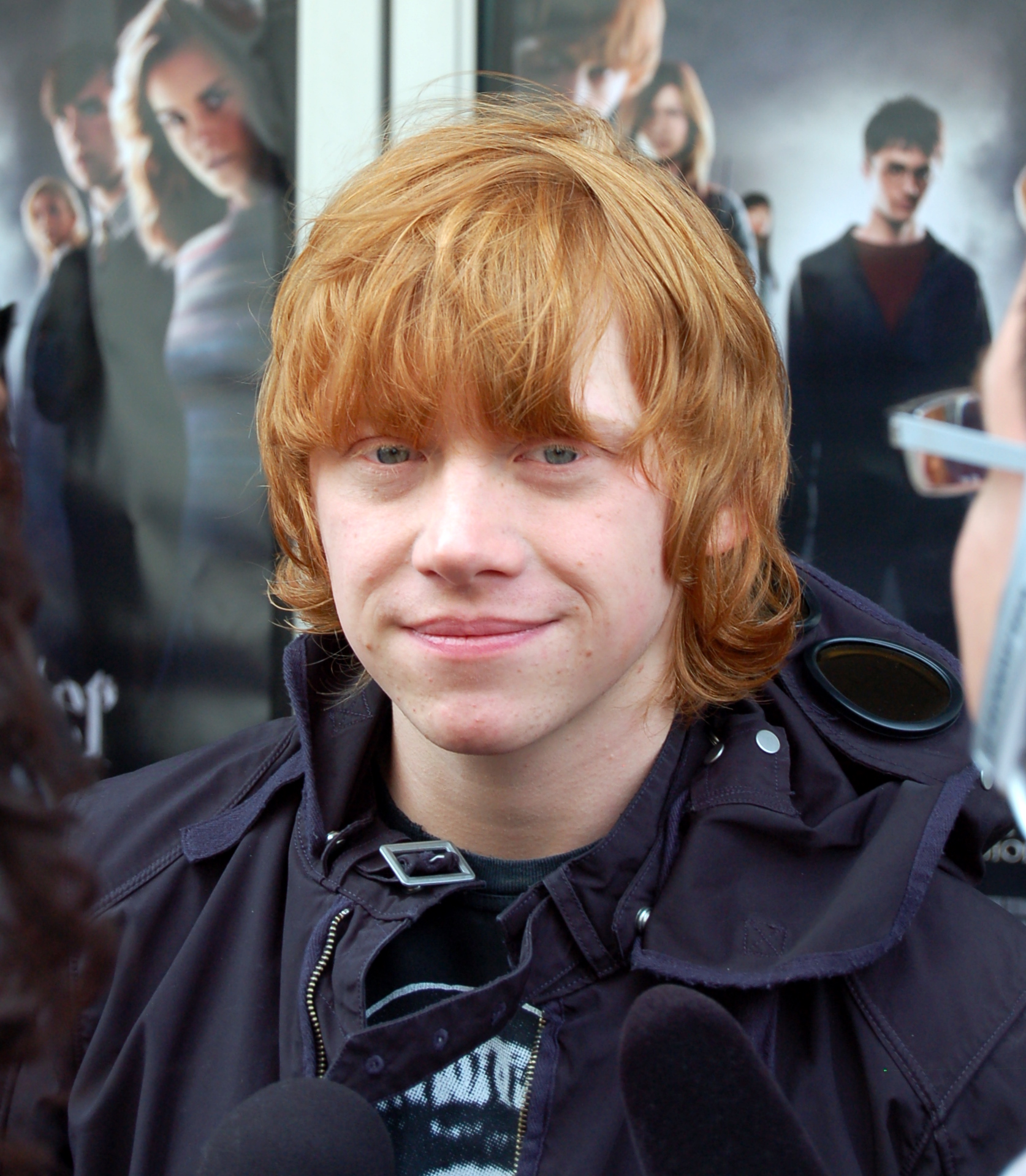
Grint at the Toronto premiere of Harry Potter and the Order of the Phoenix in 2007

In 2005, Grint reprised his role for the fourth film in the series – Harry Potter and the Goblet of Fire. The adaptation, unlike previous films, explored romantic elements and included more humour. In a 2005 interview with IGN, all three lead actors singled out humour as a reason for the film's success. It was directed by Mike Newell, whom Grint characterised as "really loud and not afraid to swear at you, but he was really cool". Goblet of Fire is one of the series' best-reviewed instalments, and is noted for its characters' maturity and sophistication, darker and more complex plotline, and the quality of the screenplay and lead actors' performances.

Harry Potter and the Order of the Phoenix, the fifth film in the Harry Potter franchise, was released to cinemas in 2007. A huge financial success, it set a record worldwide opening-weekend gross of US$394 million, superseding Spider-Man 3. It was directed by a new filmmaker, David Yates, who directed all of the subsequent Potter films. Grint said the laid-back director was "really good" and helped keep the material fresh. Grint and his Harry Potter co-stars left imprints of their hands, feet and wands in front of Grauman's Chinese Theater in Hollywood.

On 15 July 2009, the series' sixth instalment, Harry Potter and the Half-Blood Prince, was released and again set box office records. In its theatrical run, it earned US$933 million ticket sales. It is also one of the most positively reviewed Harry Potter films, with critics praising its "emotionally satisfying" story, direction, cinematography, visual design and music. Grint observed a change in Ron in this entry, pointing out that his once insecure, often overshadowed character started to become more secure and even began to show a dark side. He found it fun to personify a more emotional Ron. Between 2009 and 2010, Grint's work received three award nominations, including one win—an Otto Award from the German magazine Bravo.

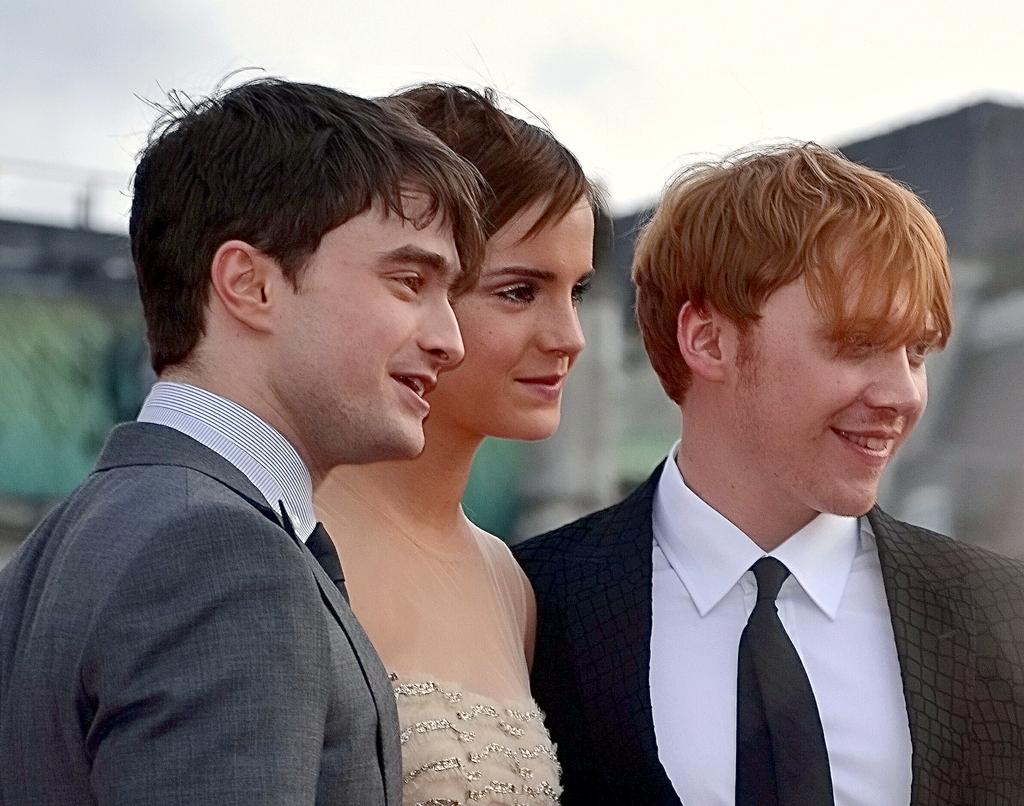
Grint with co-stars Daniel Radcliffe (left) and Emma Watson (middle) at the premiere of Harry Potter and the Deathly Hallows – Part 2 in 2011

Despite the previous films' successes, the franchise's future was put into question when the three lead actors had reservations about signing on for the final two films. However, by March 2007, Grint agreed to return for the last installments. For financial and scripting reasons, the final book was divided into two films, shot back-to-back, with filming concluding in June 2010. After completing the final film, Grint said: "I mean it literally has been my childhood, and suddenly it all came down to really just one random scene, with us jumping through a fireplace, and then it was over. ...it's very odd. Because suddenly it was all over, just like that. It was really emotional for all of us, realising that we're never going to be doing this again."

Harry Potter and the Deathly Hallows – Part 1 (2010) was released in November and grossed over US$950 million. It set several box office records and received mostly favourable reviews. Grint's portrayal of Ron again earned him critical praise. Reviewing the adaption for Slate, Dana Stevens called all three of the leads "terrific". Although he disliked the film, Joe Morgenstern of The Wall Street Journal wrote that "Grint has grown up to be a skilful actor who knows the value of a slow burn". Grint's performance brought him nominations from the MTV Movie Awards and National Movie Awards for Best Fight and Performance of the Year in 2011. He reprised his role for the seventh time in Harry Potter and the Deathly Hallows – Part 2, the final Harry Potter instalment. It resumed from where the previous film left off, and included a lot of action, whereas Part 1 had focused more on character development. Grint, along with the film, was critically acclaimed: Ann Hornaday of The Washington Post wrote, "Who could have predicted that Radcliffe, Grint and Watson would turn out to be good actors?". The film broke several box office records, including biggest midnight release, biggest first-day opening, and biggest opening-weekend. Deathly Hallows – Part 2 became the fourth highest-grossing film of all time. Harry Potter author J. K. Rowling gave a speech at the world premiere of Harry Potter and the Deathly Hallows – Part 2 on 7 July 2011 in London. She said that there were seven Harry Potter film series cast members whom she called "The Big Seven"; Grint was one of them, with Daniel Radcliffe, Emma Watson, Tom Felton, Matthew Lewis, Evanna Lynch and Bonnie Wright.

=== 2002–2011: Concurrent film work during Harry Potter ===
In 2002, Grint starred in his first non-Harry Potter film, Thunderpants, which revolves around Patrick (played by Bruce Cook) whose remarkable capacity for flatulence scores him a job as an astronaut. In this film, Grint played the co-lead role of Alan, an anosmic boy who is Patrick's only friend. It was generally ignored by critics and audiences. Most critics who did take notice of it did not respond well to it, with one writing: "This film should be shown in prisons so that inmates have a good reason to never return." Grint also appeared in Driving Lessons, a comedy drama released in 2006, starring opposite Julie Walters. It met with a mixed reception by critics, but his portrayal of an oppressed teenage boy was generally praised. Alt Film Guide's Andre Soares wrote: "Grint, on the other hand, is a revelation . . . [He] displays an innate naturalness mixed with personal charisma that turn a potentially pathetic Christian freak into a humorous, thoroughly likable – if more than a little awkward – young man".

In July 2008, it was announced that Grint would star in the drama film Cherrybomb with Robert Sheehan and Kimberley Nixon. Grint found shooting this film very different from the Harry Potter films, as he had to adjust to doing a dozen scenes per day. Grint's character—Malachy, a worker at Belfast—goes to great lengths to impress his boss's daughter, with whom he is infatuated. This film, like his next project, involved him playing violent roles. Despite premiering at the 2009 Berlin International Film Festival, the film was initially unable to find a distributor. An online campaign by Grint's fans was credited with helping to secure a distribution deal in the UK in 2010.

Jonathan Lynn directed Grint in Wild Target, a 2010 comedy thriller, where he starred with Emily Blunt and Bill Nighy. A remake of the 1993 French film Cible Emouvante, it was made on a relatively small budget of US$8 million. It was a commercial failure, earning only US$3.4 million, and garnered mostly negative reviews in the media, which criticised it for dishonouring the original film and wasting the comedic potential of its cast. However, Grint also attracted some positive notice: "It's nice to see Rupert Grint perform well in a role other than that of Ron Weasley, and it's clear that he's got a career ahead of him."

In January 2011, Grint made a cameo appearance on the BBC popular comedy show Come Fly with Me, starring comedy duo Matt Lucas and David Walliams (Little Britain). In March 2011, he was cast as the lead character in the small-budget anti-war Norwegian film Into the White, directed by Petter Næss. Principal photography started in April, and the film, which was shot on location, was released in 2012. It is based on a real incident that took place on 27 April 1940, when German Luftwaffe pilot Horst Schopis's bomber was shot down at Grotli by a Royal Navy Fleet Air Arm Blackburn Skua, which then crash-landed. The several German and British crew members found shelter by chance during a harsh winter there.

In August 2011, Grint did a photo shoot with his friend and Harry Potter co-star Tom Felton in Los Angeles for the autumn/winter collection of the fashion label Band of Outsiders. In September 2011, it was announced that Grint would voice a character in the film adaptation of Postman Pat along with David Tennant, Stephen Mangan and Jim Broadbent; it was released in May 2014. Grint also appears in the music video for Ed Sheeran's song "Lego House", released on 20 October 2011.

=== 2012–present: Further work, theatre, and television ===
In March 2012, the "Visit Britain" TV ad was released, featuring Grint alongside Julie Walters, Michelle Dockery and Stephen Fry, promoting holidaying at home in the UK. Later that month, Variety reported that Grint had been cast alongside Chloë Grace Moretz in The Drummer, a biopic film about drummer Dennis Wilson of the Beach Boys. That day, The Hollywood Reporter confirmed it and announced that filming would begin 15 June 2012 in California and Savannah, Georgia. The movie was cancelled in 2013.

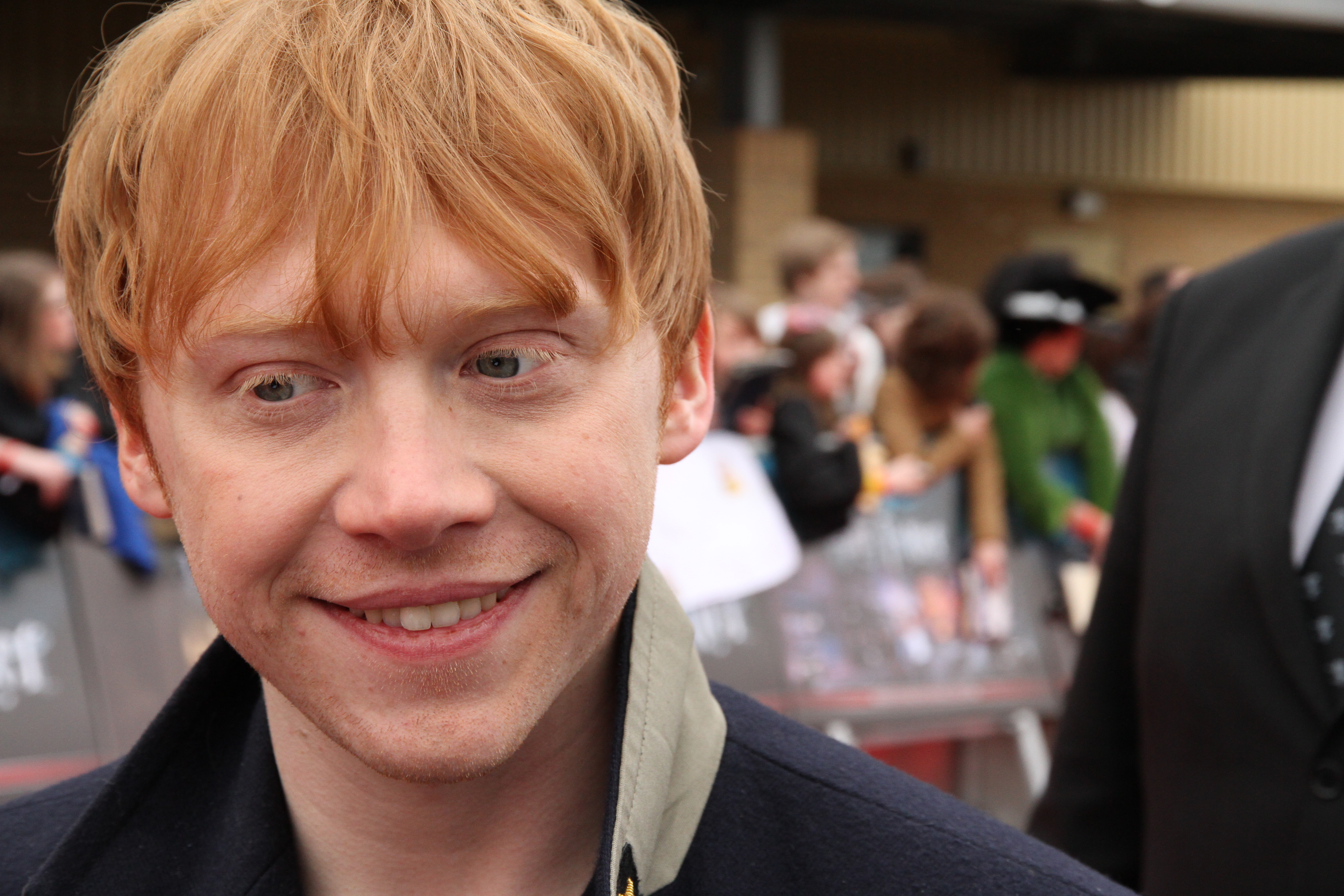
Grint in 2012

On 25 July 2012, Grint carried the 2012 London Olympic torch during the Olympic Torch Relay, part of the London 2012 Summer Olympics. He told the BBC News that it was an "overwhelming" experience that he "hoped to remember forever", and told The Daily Telegraph, "It was amazing, it was really overwhelming. It's just such an honour to be a part of this. I'm really proud". In October 2012, he narrated We Are Aliens, a 25-minute 3D Planetarium Fulldome film about the possibility of other intelligent life in the universe.

On 13 February 2013, The Hollywood Reporter's Live Feed announced that Grint would star in a television pilot for CBS called Super Clyde. It did not become a series. In July 2013, it was confirmed that Grint would make his stage debut in the second run of Jez Butterworth's black comedy Mojo, with Grint playing Sweets, a hood who "pops amphetamines like Smarties" and "does a sort of double act, full of comic menace". The play, which also starred Brendan Coyle, Ben Whishaw and Daniel Mays, was based on real-life events, and ran from 26 October 2013 to 8 February 2014 at the Harold Pinter Theatre in London. Grint won the WhatsOnStage Award for Best London Newcomer for his role.

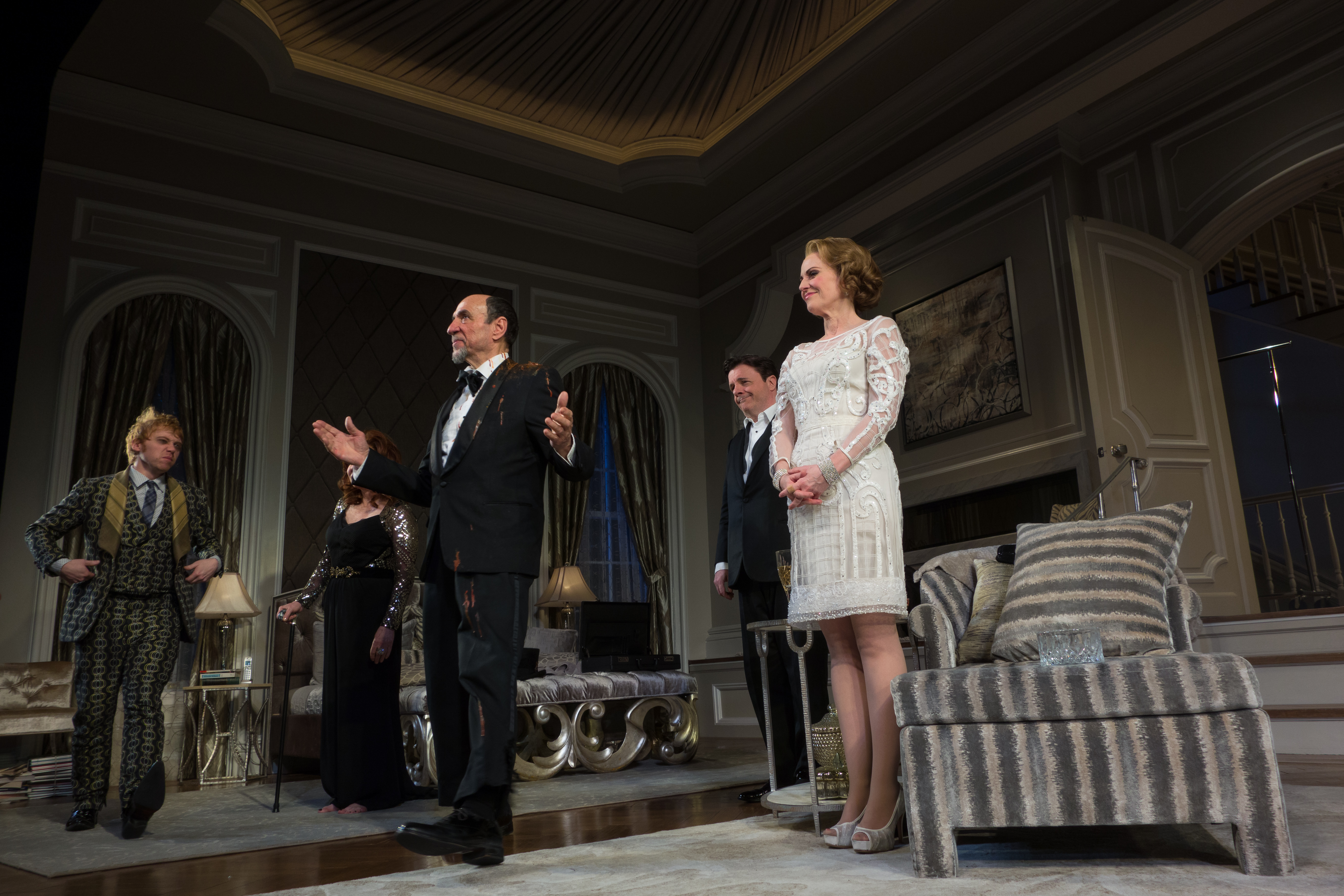
Grint (far left) during a performance of It's Only a Play at the Gerald Schoenfeld Theatre in 2014

In June 2014, it was announced that Grint would make his Broadway debut as Frank Finger in the play It's Only a Play at the Gerald Schoenfeld Theatre, appearing with Matthew Broderick, Nathan Lane, Stockard Channing, and Megan Mullally. It ran from 28 August 2014 to 4 January 2015.

Since 2019, Grint has starred as Julian Pearce in the Apple TV+ psychological horror series Servant. The series has been critically praised. In December 2021, the show was renewed for its fourth and final season.

Grint starred in the 2022 Netflix anthology series Guillermo del Toro's Cabinet of Curiosities and in M. Night Shyamalan's 2023 thriller film Knock at the Cabin. He also reunited with multiple cast members of the Harry Potter film series for an HBO Max special, Harry Potter 20th Anniversary: Return to Hogwarts, which premiered on 1 January 2022.

In December 2024, Finnish film director Hanna Bergholm announced that her film, Nightborn (Yön Lapsi), had wrapped filming, with Grint and Seidi Haarla starring in the lead roles. In January 2026, the film was selected for the main competition in the 76th Berlin International Film Festival.

In August 2025, Grint starred in Ed Sheeran's music video for song "A Little More". In December 2025, Grint was cast in Ti West's Ebenezer, alongside Johnny Depp, Andrea Riseborough, Ian McKellen, and Tramell Tillman. The film is set for release in November 2026.

Grint will reprise the role of Ron Weasley in the Broadway production of Harry Potter and the Cursed Child at the Lyric Theatre for a 17-week engagement scheduled to run from 2 February to 30 May 2027.

== Personal life ==
Grint lives on an estate in Hertfordshire. He has been in a relationship with actress Georgia Groome since 2011. They have two daughters. He joined Instagram in November 2020, posting a photo of himself holding his newborn daughter. He reached one million followers within four hours and one minute of creating his account, breaking the previous Guinness World Records title for the fastest time to reach one million followers on the platform.

As Grint's earliest ambition was to be an ice cream man, he bought an ice cream van with the money he earned from the Harry Potter series and sold ice cream to local customers.

He took part in the 2012 Summer Olympics torch relay, carrying the flame through Hendon in northwest London to outside Middlesex University. Grint is a keen football fan and an avid supporter of Tottenham Hotspur.

In June 2026, Grint secured planning permission from North Hertfordshire District Council to develop a nine-home eco-village on his Hertfordshire estate, on the condition that Grint personally contributed "at least £187,000 towards local infrastructure" such as schools, public spaces, library services and youth facilities.

=== Philanthropy ===
Grint has supported various charitable organisations, including donating personal items to charity auctions. He participated in the Wacky Rally in 2010 with James and Oliver Phelps, which raised money for Britain's Royal National Lifeboat Institution. He was one of more than 40 people to produce designs for the Chrysalis Collection for Keech Hospice Care in Luton. His piece, a painted butterfly, was auctioned on eBay in March 2010. In May 2011, with other celebrities, he took part in the "Make Mine Milk" ad campaign to promote daily milk drinking. His ads were seen on posters and the sides of thousands of buses across the United Kingdom. Since 2011, he has supported the Little Star Award for Cancer Research UK. "I think that it's wonderful that Cancer Research UK is helping to bring a little bit of magic to the children's lives in this way", he said.

=== Tax affairs ===
In 2016, Grint lost an appeal against HMRC's decision to block his attempt to change his accounting date. This move was intended to reduce his tax liability by deferring income into a lower tax year. At that time, the actor was calculated to have earned around £24 million from the Harry Potter franchise. However, HMRC successfully argued that the change was motivated by tax avoidance rather than legitimate business reasons.

In 2019, HMRC brought another case against Grint. He was ordered to pay an additional £1.8 million in tax after losing the legal battle with HMRC. The tax authority argued that a £4.5 million sum he received should be classified as income rather than as a capital asset which is subject to much lower tax rate. This ruling increased his tax liability for the 2011–12 tax year. Grint later lost his appeal claim and was ordered to pay £1.8 million of tax liability and legal costs.

== Filmography ==
Key
†	Denotes works that have not yet been released

=== Film ===
Year	Title	Role	Notes
2001	Harry Potter and the Philosopher's Stone	Ron Weasley	
2002	Thunderpants	Alan A. Allen	
2002	Harry Potter and the Chamber of Secrets	Ron Weasley	
2004	Harry Potter and the Prisoner of Azkaban	Ron Weasley	
2005	Harry Potter and the Goblet of Fire	Ron Weasley	
2006	Driving Lessons	Ben Marshall	
2007	Harry Potter and the Order of the Phoenix	Ron Weasley	
2009	Cherrybomb	Malachy McKinney	
2009	Harry Potter and the Half-Blood Prince	Ron Weasley	
2010	Wild Target	Tony	
2010	Harry Potter and the Deathly Hallows – Part 1	Ron Weasley	
2011	Harry Potter and the Deathly Hallows – Part 2	Ron Weasley	
2012	Into the White	Gunner Robert Smith	
2013	Charlie Countryman	Karl	
2013	CBGB	Cheetah Chrome	
2014	Postman Pat: The Movie	Josh	Voice role
2014	Underdogs	Amadeo	
2015	Moonwalkers	Jonny Thorpe	
2023	Knock at the Cabin	Redmond	
2026	Nightborn	Jon	
2026	Ebenezer	Bob Cratchit	

=== Television ===
Year	Title	Role	Notes
2011	Come Fly with Me	Himself	Season 1, Episode 3
2012	American Dad!	Liam	Voice role; Episode: "Killer Vacation"
2016	Tracey Ullman's Show	Himself	Season 1, Episode 1
2017	Urban Myths	August "Gustl" Kubizek	Episode: "Adolf the Artist"
2017–2018	Snatch	Charlie Cavendish-Scott	Main role; also executive producer
2017–2018	Sick Note	Daniel Glass	Main role
2018	The ABC Murders	Inspector Crome	Miniseries
2019–2023	Servant	Julian Pearce	Main role
2022	Harry Potter 20th Anniversary: Return to Hogwarts	Himself	Television special
2022	Guillermo del Toro's Cabinet of Curiosities	Walter Gilman	Episode: "Dreams in the Witch House"

=== Stage ===
Year	Title	Role	Venue
2013	Mojo	Sweets	Harold Pinter Theatre
2014	It's Only a Play	Frank Finger	Gerald Schoenfeld Theatre
2027	Harry Potter and the Cursed Child	Ron Weasley	Lyric Theatre

=== Video games ===
Year	Title	Role
2007	Harry Potter and the Order of the Phoenix	Ron Weasley (voice)
2009	Harry Potter and the Half-Blood Prince	Ron Weasley (voice)
2010	Harry Potter and the Deathly Hallows – Part 1	Ron Weasley (voice)
2011	Harry Potter and the Deathly Hallows – Part 2	Ron Weasley (voice)

=== Music ===
Year	Title	Format	Notes
2011	"Lego House"	Music Video	Song by English singer-songwriter Ed Sheeran
2012	"Over the Rainbow"	Song	Into the White Soundtrack
2014	"Struck by Lightning"	Song	Postman Pat: The Movie Soundtrack
2021	"The Sky Cries"	Music Video	Song by Saleka
2025	"A Little More"	Music Video	Song by Ed Sheeran

=== Other roles ===
Year	Title	Role	Notes
2003	Baggy Trousers	Molesworth (voice)	Series, BBC Radio 4
2006	The Queen's Handbag	Ron Weasley	Pre-recorded clip
2010	Harry Potter and the Forbidden Journey	Ron Weasley	Theme park attraction
2011	Smithy	Himself	Red Nose Day 2011 sketch
2012	Holidays at Home are Great	Himself	TV advertisement
2012	We Are Aliens	Narrator (voice)	The National Space Centre's Show
2014	Harry Potter and the Escape from Gringotts	Ron Weasley	Theme park attraction
2014	Hogwarts Express	Ron Weasley	Theme park attraction
2015	Tom Gates	Tom Gates (voice)	Audiobook series
2015	Enemy of Man	Rosse	Film concept trailer

== Awards and nominations ==
Year	Award	Category	Work	Result
2001	Online Film & Television Association	Best Youth Performance	Harry Potter and the Philosopher's Stone (film)	Nominated
2002	British Critic's Circle	Best Newcomer	Harry Potter and the Philosopher's Stone (film)	Nominated
2002	Empire Awards	Best Debut (shared with Daniel Radcliffe and Emma Watson)	Harry Potter and the Philosopher's Stone (film)	Nominated
2002	Satellite Award	Outstanding New Talent	Harry Potter and the Philosopher's Stone (film)	Won
2002	Young Artist Award	Most Promising Young Newcomer	Harry Potter and the Philosopher's Stone (film)	Won
2002	Young Artist Award	Best Ensemble in a Feature Film (Shared with Emma Watson and Tom Felton)	Harry Potter and the Philosopher's Stone (film)	Nominated
2003	Phoenix Film Critics Society Awards	Best Acting Ensemble	Harry Potter and the Chamber of Secrets	Nominated
2006	2006 MTV Movie Awards	Best On-Screen Team (shared with Daniel Radcliffe and Emma Watson)	Harry Potter and the Goblet of Fire	Nominated
2007	National Movie Award	Best Performance by a Male	Harry Potter and the Order of the Phoenix	Nominated
2009	Portrait Choice Award	Best Male Movie Performance	Harry Potter and the Half-Blood Prince	Nominated
2009	2009 Scream Awards	Best Supporting Actor	Harry Potter and the Half-Blood Prince	Nominated
2009	2009 Scream Awards	Best Ensemble	Harry Potter and the Half-Blood Prince	Won
2010	BBC Radio 1 Teen Awards	Best British Actor	Harry Potter and the Half-Blood Prince	Nominated
2010	Otto Award	Movie Star	Harry Potter and the Half-Blood Prince	Won
2010	36th People's Choice Awards	Favorite On-Screen Team	Harry Potter and the Half-Blood Prince	Nominated
2011	National Movie Awards	Performance of the Year	Harry Potter and the Deathly Hallows – Part 1	Nominated
2011	2011 MTV Movie Awards	Best Fight (Shared with Daniel Radcliffe, Emma Watson, Arben Bajraktaraj and Rod Hunt)	Harry Potter and the Deathly Hallows – Part 1	Nominated
2011	2011 Scream Awards	Best Supporting Actor	Harry Potter and the Deathly Hallows – Part 1	Nominated
2011	BBC Radio 1 Teen Awards	Best British Actor	Harry Potter and the Deathly Hallows – Part 2	Won
2011	IGN Summer Movie Awards	Best Ensemble Cast	Harry Potter and the Deathly Hallows – Part 2	Nominated
2011	San Diego Film Critics Society Award	Best Ensemble Performance	Harry Potter and the Deathly Hallows – Part 2	Won
2011	Washington D.C. Area Film Critics Association Award	Best Ensemble	Harry Potter and the Deathly Hallows – Part 2	Nominated
2012	38th People's Choice Awards	Favorite Movie Ensemble	Harry Potter and the Deathly Hallows – Part 2	Won
2012	38th People's Choice Awards	Favourite Film Star (under 25)	Harry Potter and the Deathly Hallows – Part 2	Nominated
2012	2012 MTV Movie Awards	Best Kiss (Shared With Emma Watson)	Harry Potter and the Deathly Hallows – Part 2	Nominated
2012	2012 MTV Movie Awards	Best Cast (Shared with Daniel Radcliffe, Emma Watson and Tom Felton)	Harry Potter and the Deathly Hallows – Part 2	Won
2014	WhatsOnStage Awards	Best London Newcomer of the Year	Mojo	Won
2014	NewNowNext Awards	Best New Broadway Lead Actor	Mojo	Nominated
2015	Broadway.com Audience Choice Awards	Favorite Featured Actor in a Play	It's Only a Play	Won
2015	Broadway.com Audience Choice Awards	Favorite Funny Performance	It's Only a Play	Nominated
2015	Broadway.com Audience Choice Awards	Favorite Breakthrough Performance (Male)	It's Only a Play	Won
2018	National Film Awards UK	Best Actor	Snatch	Nominated
2018	IARA Awards	Best Young Actor	Snatch	Nominated
2021	SEC Awards	Best Actor in a Thriller Series	Servant	Nominated
2021	Hollywood Critics Association	Best Supporting Actor in a Streaming Series, Drama	Servant	Won
2021	Pena De Prata	Best Supporting Actor in a Drama Series	Servant	Nominated
2022	Critics' Choice Super Awards	Best Actor in a Horror Series	Servant	Nominated

== See also ==
- List of Harry Potter cast members
