= Richard Dormer =

Irish actor, playwright and screenwriter

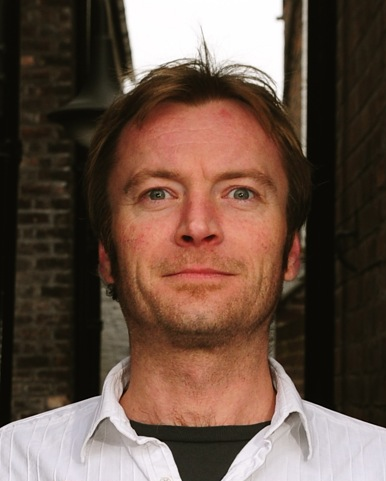
- Born: Portadown, County Armagh, Northern Ireland
- Occupations: Actor, playwright
- Years active: 1991–present
- Spouse: Rachel O'Riordan

Richard Dormer is an actor and playwright from Northern Ireland. He is best known for his roles as Beric Dondarrion in the HBO television series Game of Thrones and Dan Anderssen in Sky Atlantic's Fortitude.

== Early life and education ==
Richard Dormer was born into a Protestant family in Portadown, Northern Ireland.

He studied acting at the Royal Academy of Dramatic Art in London. After living and working in London, he returned to Northern Ireland.

== Career ==
=== Stage and radio ===
Dormer gained recognition following his performance as Northern Irish snooker star Alex Higgins in the 2003 play Hurricane, which he wrote and starred in. Dormer won The Stage award for Best Actor in 2003. In 2004, Dormer won the Irish Times Best Actor Award for his performance in Frank McGuinness's Observe the Sons of Ulster Marching Towards the Somme and in 2005 completed a season with Sir Peter Hall at the Theatre Royal and starred in Bath as Angelo in William Shakespeare's Measure for Measure, Jean in August Strindberg's Miss Julie and in a production of Samuel Beckett's Waiting for Godot.

Dormer has written a number of plays, including The Half and Gentleman's Tea Drinking Society, which were produced through the Ransom theatre company Belfast. In 2012, Dormer was commissioned by the Abbey Theatre to write a play. Set in Brooklyn in the summer of 1969, Dormer's Drum Belly gives an insight into the dark edgy underworld of New York's Irish gangsters and opened in April 2013 to mainly positive reviews and was published by Bloomsbury Publishing.

Dormer has provided the voices for over 20 BBC Radio 4 plays, documentaries and advertising campaigns. In 2020, he played the Director of the Civil Contingencies Secretariat in the Sky drama series, COBRA, starring Robert Carlyle as the British Prime Minister.

Dormer has described his early career as difficult owing to his Northern Irish accent, which he said "everybody associated with terrorism". He refused to play roles he described as "terrorists or thugs", which limited his opportunities in film and television, although he felt the decision to focus on stage acting had sharpened his acting skills.

=== Film ===
Following a run of film castings playing secondary characters, he was cast as the lead in the 2012 Good Vibrations, which tells the story of Northern Ireland personality and punk rock visionary Terri Hooley. The film premièred at the 2012 Cannes Film Festival, was awarded Best Film at the Galway film awards, best screenplay, Dinard and was nominated for the Outstanding Debut award at the 2014 British Academy of Film and Television Arts Awards. The film was well received by critics gaining consistent reviews, most of which highlighted Dormer's performance as a strength. Dormer's portrayal of Terri Hooley saw him nominated in the Best Actor award in the 2013 Irish Film and Television Awards. He has since played roles in Yann Demange's critically acclaimed film '71 alongside Jack O'Connell. In 2019, Dormer portrayed Curtis Welch, town physician of Nome, Alaska, in the Disney film Togo.

=== Television ===
Dormer has become a well known television actor, more recently playing key roles in the Cinemax drama series Hunted and BBC One's Hidden. 2012 also saw Dormer taking over the role of Lord Beric Dondarrion, known as the "Lightning Lord", the leader of the "Brotherhood Without Banners", for the third season of the HBO series Game of Thrones. In 2016, Dormer reprised his role as Dondarrion in the sixth season of the series and returned for the seventh season, airing in 2017 as well as the eighth and final season, airing in 2019.

Dormer is the voice of the Dad on the children's animated series Lily's Driftwood Bay. The series aired in May on the Nick Jr. Channel in the UK and on Sprout in the US. It also airs on RTÉ in Ireland, ABC Australia, KiKa in Germany, MTV in Finland, NRK in Norway, SVT in Sweden, and HOP! in Israel. Broadcasters in Australia and the US are keeping the original voices to the series.

In 2014, Dormer began filming on Sky Atlantic's Fortitude. Described as "their most ambitious project to date", he takes the role of Sheriff Dan Anderssen and stars alongside Stanley Tucci, Michael Gambon, Christopher Eccleston and The Killing's Sofie Gråbøl. Fortitude aired on 29 January 2015. The series is set in the fictional Arctic Norwegian settlement of Fortitude. On 9 April 2015, Sky Atlantic recommissioned the show for a second series consisting of 10 episodes.

Also in 2015, Dormer starred in the BBC drama We're Doomed! The Dad's Army Story as TV producer David Croft. The comedy-drama retells the creation of the popular BBC sitcom Dad's Army as well as the relationship between Croft and Jimmy Perry who became successful TV comedy writers.

In 2020, Dormer appeared in the lead role of Captain Sam Vimes of the Ankh-Morpork City Watch in the BBC series The Watch, based on the Discworld novels by Terry Pratchett. He also has played Fraser Walker, Director of the Civil Contingencies Secretariat, in two series of COBRA.

In 2023, Dormer appeared as Gerald 'Gerry' Cliff in Series 1 of the BBC1 drama, Blue Lights. He returned to this role in one episode of Series 4.

In 2024 he appeared in the Sky TV series The Day of the Jackal as Norman Stoke (series 1), the Jackal's gunsmith and a former armourer in the Ulster Volunteer Force.

Dormer also had a role in the crime thriller television series The Assassin on Prime Video.

== Personal life ==
He lives in Belfast and is married to director Rachel O'Riordan.

== Filmography ==
=== Film ===
Year	Title	Role	Notes
2000	A Further Gesture	Joe	
2001	Mapmaker	Harry Hawcett	
2002	Puckoon	Arthur Faddington	
2002	The Escapist	Denis' Brief	
2005	Mrs Henderson Presents	Comic	
2005	The Mighty Celt	Ronan	
2006	Middletown	Ned	
2009	Scapegoat	Narrator	
2009	Five Minutes of Heaven	Michael	Featured at Sundance Film Festival
2009	Pumpgirl	Hammy	
2009	Best: His Mother's Son	Ad Director	
2010	Ghost Machine	Taggert	
2012	Jump	Johnny	
2012	Good Vibrations	Terri Hooley	Nominated for IFTA best actor award
2013	Dark Touch	Henry	
2014	Hyena	Nick Taylor	
2014	Shooting for Socrates	Arthur	
2014	'71	Eamon	
2015	11 Minutes	Director Richard Martin	
2019	Togo	Dr. Curtis Welch	

=== Television ===
Year	Title	Role	Notes
1991	Casualty	Rick Tomlinson	
1992	Soldier Soldier	Cpt David Lutchens	
1993	The Young Indiana Jones Chronicles	Civilian	
2003	Holy Cross	Seamus	
2007	My Boy Jack	Corporal John O'Leary	ITV film with Daniel Radcliffe
2008	Last Man Hanging	James Brown	
2010	An Crisis	Kyle Braid	
2011	Brendan Smyth: Betrayal of Trust	Chris Moore	
2011	Justice	George	
2011	Hidden	Frank Hanna	
2012	Hunted	Lewis Conroy	
2013, 2016–2019	Game of Thrones	Beric Dondarrion	Recurring role
2014	Lily's Driftwood Bay	Dad	
2015	We're Doomed! The Dad's Army Story	David Croft	Documentary television film
2015–2018	Fortitude	Sheriff Dan Anderssen	Lead role
2016	The Musketeers	Christophe	
2017	Rellik	DCI Gabriel Markham	
2020	The Watch	Captain Sam Vimes	
2020	COBRA	Fraser Walker	Recurring role
2023	Blue Lights	Gerry Cliff	8 episodes
2023	Secret Invasion	Agent Prescod	Episode: "Resurrection"
2023–2025	Castlevania: Nocturne	The Abbot (voice)	Main role
2024	The Day of the Jackal	Norman Stoke	3 episodes
2025	The Assassin	Damian	1 episode
2025	Gangs of London	Cornelius Quinn	
2026	Apollo Has Fallen	Kane	
