= The Harp Bar =

Pub and music venue in Belfast, Northern Ireland

Coordinates: 54.6016°N 5.9269°W

The Harp Bar was a public house and live music venue located on Hill Street in Belfast's City Centre, Northern Ireland. It was known for showcasing punk rock and local music, particularly during the 1970s and 1980s.

== History ==
From 1977 to 1984, the Harp Bar was owned by Patrick "Patsy" Lennon, who also built and owned the Limelight nightclub and Dome Bar.

The Harp Bar opened as a music venue and bar during the Troubles in Northern Ireland. Despite the ongoing political unrest in Ireland, the venue remained a site for the developing punk scene in Belfast.

The Harp began hosting punk bands in early 1978. On 21 April 1978, Victim, supported by The Androids, played the venue’s first punk show. Bands such as Rudi made their debut at The Harp in May 1978, and Stiff Little Fingers played at the venue three times: in May, July, and August in 1978.

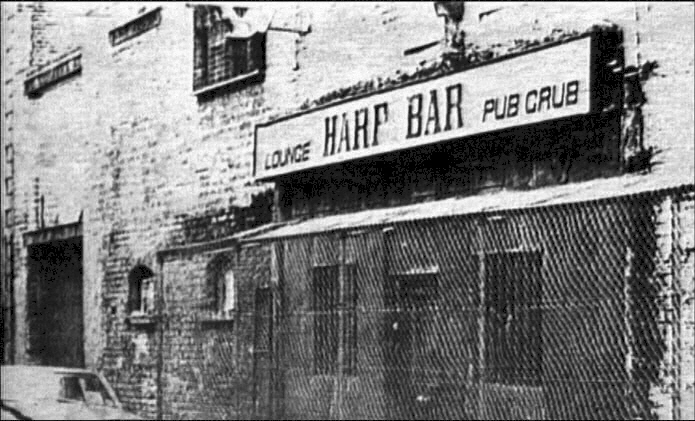
Front of the Harp Bar, pictured with metal security grills and blacked-out windows.

The Harp was a relatively small venue, but it experienced a steady increase in popularity. The venue suffered structural damage during the Troubles.

The bar’s city-center location experienced limited foot traffic at night, largely due to safety concerns during the Troubles. Despite this, it developed a reputation as a relatively neutral venue where both Protestants and Catholics could gather to watch local punk bands perform. Terri Hooley later noted that “at a time when the religious divide in Northern Ireland was most pronounced, we had kids from both sides of the community coming together in the name of music.” Brian Young of the band Rudi similarly recalled, "It really was the first time I can remember that significant numbers of young people from all sections and classes of the community, and from both sides of the sectarian divide, were able to meet up and get to know each other, initially drawn together by their enthusiasm for this new music and lifestyle."

== Media appearances ==
The Harp appeared in documentaries and television, including the independent documentary film Shellshock Rock. The BBC programme Something Else, broadcast in January 1980, carried a report on the punk scene in Belfast, which featured footage and interviews from the Harp Bar. The Something Else clip of punks on the Harp Bar dance floor regularly appears in reruns of the BBC’s Top Of The Pops: The Story of 1977 as representative of the punk movement.

== Decline ==
Authors of the critically acclaimed It Makes You Want to Spit - The Definitive Guide to Punk in Northern Ireland 1977-1982 and local punk enthusiasts Sean O'Neill and Guy Trelford reported, "By the end of 1979, things had gone a bit stale. Bands started to get a bit fed up playing at the same venue and to the same old faces, and gigs began to get cancelled at the last minute. Frustration started to creep in". The Harp stopped hosting punk shows in mid-1981 when it became a Country Western-themed bar. The original venue closed in the 1990s.

A new Harp Bar opened in a different location in Belfast in 2013, serving as a tribute to the original venue. In 2019, there were plans to build a hotel on the original Hill Street site. Today, the Harp Bar is owned by The Duke of York bar and is decorated with velvet interiors that "resonate with Victorian Belfast".
