= Gordon Blair (computer scientist) =

British computer scientist

Gordon Blair is a Distinguished Professor of Distributed Systems in the School of Computing and Communications at Lancaster University. He is also the co-director of the Centre of Excellence in Environmental Data Science (CEEDS).

Gordon Blair is co-author of Distributed systems: concepts and design, a popular textbooks on distributed systems. His research focuses on reflective and adaptive middleware, and model-driven engineering. His research, with over 300 papers published, has been cited over 19,000 times. He is joint Editor-in-Chief of the Journal of Internet Services and Applications.

== Education ==
Gordon Blair received a BSc and PhD in Computer Science, in 1980 and 1983, respectively, and both from Strathclyde University.

== Selected works ==
- Blair, G. S.; Coulson, G.; Robin, P.; Papathomas, M. (1998). "An Architecture for Next Generation Middleware". Middleware'98. pp. 191–206. doi:10.1007/978-1-4471-1283-9_12. ISBN 978-1-4471-1285-3.
- Kon, Fabio; Costa, Fabio; Blair, Gordon; Campbell, Roy H. (2002). "The case for reflective middleware". Communications of the ACM. 45 (6): 33–38. doi:10.1145/508448.508470. S2CID 6841562.
- Blair, Gordon; Bencomo, Nelly; France, Robert B. (2009). "Models@ run.time". Computer. 42 (10): 22–27. Bibcode:2009Compr..42j..22B. doi:10.1109/MC.2009.326. S2CID 17647617.
- Blair, Gordon S.; Henrys, Peter; Leeson, Amber; Watkins, John; Eastoe, Emma; Jarvis, Susan; Young, Paul J. (2019). "Data Science of the Natural Environment: A Research Roadmap". Frontiers in Environmental Science. 7 121. Bibcode:2019FrEnS...7..121B. doi:10.3389/fenvs.2019.00121.
- Coulouris, George F.; Dollimore, Jean; Kindberg, Tim; Blair, Gordon (2012). Distributed Systems: Concepts and Design. Addison-Wesley. ISBN 978-0132143011.
