= Gordon Blair (musician) =

Northern Irish musician

- Also known as: Gordy Blair
- Born: 1958 (age 66–67); Belfast, Northern Ireland
- Genres: Rock, punk rock
- Instrument: Guitar

Gordon Blair (born 1958 in Belfast), usually known as Gordy Blair, is a Northern Irish musician.

Blair started off his musical career as the bass guitarist for Highway Star, the band that was to become Stiff Little Fingers. In 1976 he joined Belfast punk band Rudi, with whom he stayed for three years. After leaving Rudi, he played for The Outcasts, The Trial, Big Self and Ruefrex, lasting for periods of between a year and three years with each band. Between 1987 and 1997, he spent various periods of time playing bass for Australian group Dave Graney and the Coral Snakes, before concentrating on a new career in desktop publishing.
