= The Outcasts (Belfast band) =

Northern Irish band

- Origin: Belfast, Northern Ireland
- Genres: Punk rock
- Years active: 1977–present
- Labels: It, Good Vibrations, GBH, Outcasts Only, Anagram, New Rose
- Spinoffs: Time to Pray
- Members: Greg Cowan; Martin Cowan; JP Dear Boy Moonie; Ian "Buck" Murdock
- Past members: Blair Hamilton; Colin Getgood; Colin Cowan; Gordy Blair; Raymond Falls; Petesy Burns

The Outcasts are a punk rock band from Belfast, Northern Ireland, formed in 1977.

== History ==
The band formed in early 1977, with a line-up of Blair Hamilton (vocals), Colin "Getty" Getgood (lead guitar) and the three Cowan brothers Greg (bass), Colin (drums) and Martin (rhythm guitar). According to Greg Cowan, their name derived from the fact that they were banned from five clubs in one week. Hamilton left the band within a month of its formation, with Greg Cowan taking over vocals.

The band had their first gig in May 1977, playing a mixture of their own songs and cover versions of songs by The Sex Pistols, The Clash, The Damned and The Ramones. After building a strong local following, they were picked up by the local It record label, which released the band's debut single, "Frustration", in May 1978. They were then signed to Terri Hooley's Good Vibrations label. It released "Just Another Teenage Rebel" in November 1978, which saw the band receiving airplay on national radio from John Peel. A further single and the band's debut album, Self Conscious Over You followed in 1979. Shortly before the album was released, Greg Cowan was involved in a serious car crash that left him in traction for fourteen weeks and unable to play bass, so Gordy Blair (of another Belfast band, Rudi) joined, with Raymond Falls also joining on drums, because, according to Cowan, "Colin was such a bad drummer".

Trouble followed the band around and led to their being sacked from Good Vibrations, so their next release was on their own GBH label in 1981, the "Magnum Force" single. This was followed by the band's first Peel Session for BBC Radio 1. GBH became Outcasts Only, and their next releases was the Programme Love EP in 1981. In 1982 they released a cover of The Glitter Band's "Angel Face", which spent over two months in the UK Indie Chart, peaking at number 21. The band were struck a serious blow when Colin Cowan was killed in a car crash. Colin was described by his brother Greg as "the core of the band. He started The Outcasts, he even gave the band its name". The large attendance at Colin's funeral prompted the band to play a thank-you gig at the Harp Bar, and the positive reaction convinced the band that they should carry on. They recorded a second Peel session and released the Blood and Thunder album on Abstract Records, which reached number 20 in the indie album chart. A few more singles and the Seven Deadly Sins mini-album followed, but the band split in early 1985. Greg Cowan, Martin and Getty started a new band, Time To Pray, but this only lasted until 1986. Ray Falls joined the army.

Greg Cowan returned in 2003 with an "Irish punk supergroup" along with members of Rudi and Stalag 17, performing at the book launch of It Makes You Want to Spit!, which is still going as Shame Academy. In August 2011 The Outcasts played on Rebellion festival in Blackpool. In 2020 The Outcasts played on Toy Dolls Tour. On 11 July 2022, the band announced the retirement of their guitarist, Petesy Burns. They said "We're sad to announce that Petesy's hanging up his guns as Outcasts guitarist… but so happy to welcome Buck Defect as permanent replacement!!!! We thank Petesy so much his talent and friendship both on and off the stage and wish him all the best for the future !! But can’t wait for you to hear this new exciting lineup with Buck debuting at Rebellion and carrying on with all future gigs !!"

Petesy Burns died on 1 January 2026.

== Discography ==
Chart placings shown are from the UK Indie Chart.

=== Singles ===
- "Frustration" (1978) It
- "Justa Nother Teenage Rebel" (1978) Good Vibrations
- "Self Conscious Over You" (1979) Good Vibrations
- "Magnum Force" (1981) GBH
- Programme Love EP (1981) Outcasts Only
- "Angel Face" (1982) Outcasts Only (No. 21)
- "Nowhere Left to Run" (1983) Anagram
- "Seven Deadly Sins" (1984) New Rose (No. 40)
- "1969" (1985) New Rose

Split singles

- Battle of the Bands (1979) Good Vibrations: "The Cops are Comin'"

=== Albums ===
- Self Conscious Over You (1979) Good Vibrations (No. 20)
- Blood and Thunder (1983) Abstract (No. 20)
- Seven Deadly Sins (1984) New Rose (No. 19)

==== Compilations ====
- The Outcasts: Punk Singles Collection (1995) Anagram
- Blood and Thunder/Seven Deadly Sins (1998) Captain Oi!
