= Terri Hooley =

Northern Irish music entrepreneur

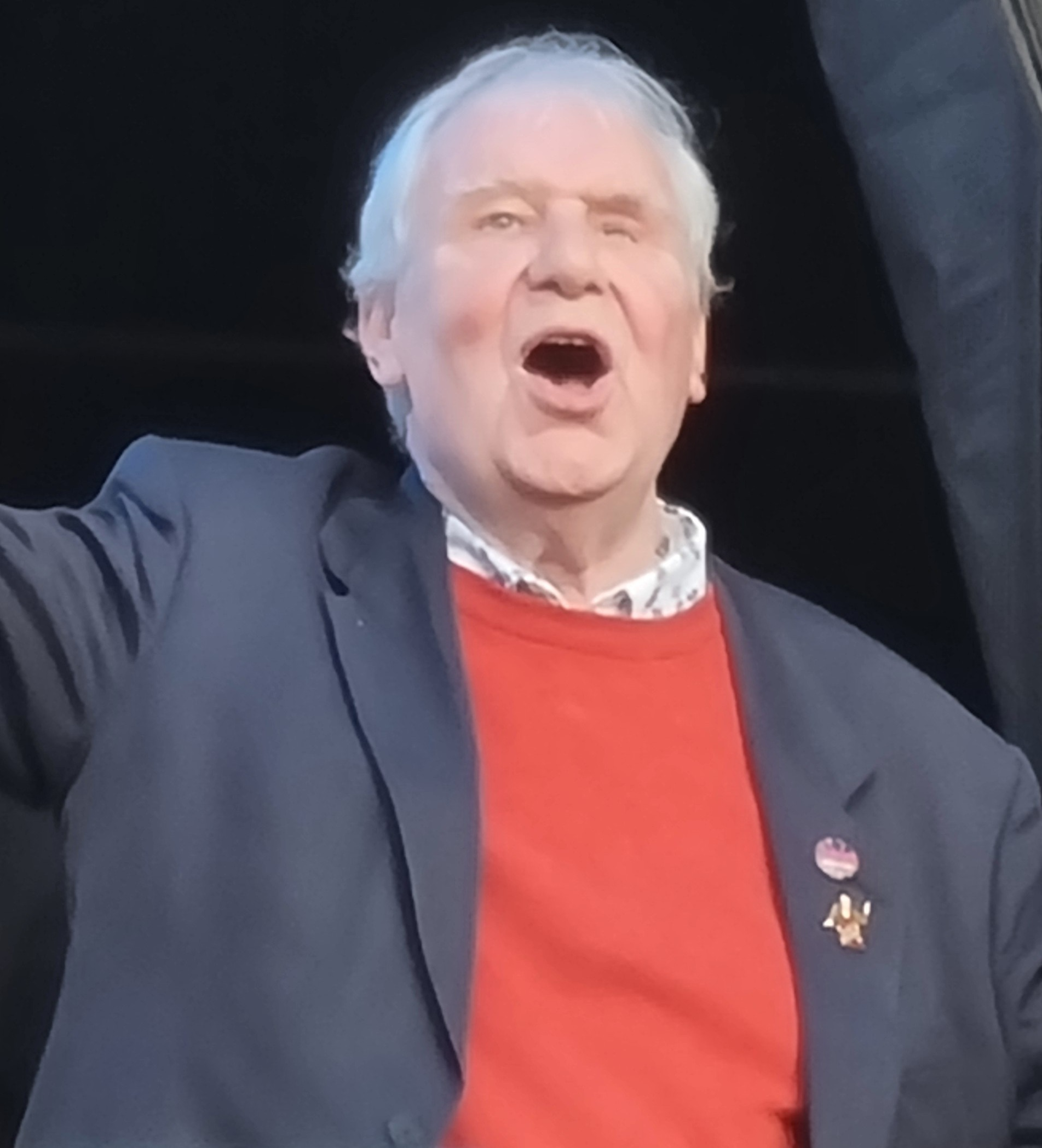
- Terri Hooley in 2025
- Born: Terence Wilfred Hooley; 23 December 1948 (age 76); Belfast, Northern Ireland
- Occupation: Entrepreneur
- Known for: Founder of Good Vibrations record label

Terence Wilfred Hooley (born 23 December 1948) is a businessman from Northern Ireland who is a prominent figure in the Belfast punk scene and founder of the Good Vibrations record shop and label. He was responsible for bands such as The Undertones, Rudi, Protex and The Outcasts making their mark on the music scene in Ireland and Britain. After playing "Teenage Kicks" on BBC, national radio John Peel then became a big supporter of the Good Vibrations record label.

Despite growing popularity, Good Vibrations filed for bankruptcy in 1982, just as the first wave of British punk had died. Bands that had gone to London, such as Protex and Rudi, returned to Hooley and Belfast. Hooley's friends later got him a shop called Vintage Records, Co. just around the corner from Good Vibrations. The label celebrated its 30th anniversary in April 2008. The Good Vibrations record shop at Winetavern Street, Belfast, closed in July 2011.

In October 2012, Hooley was verbally abused and pushed by two men while out walking his dog in East Belfast. During the incident Hooley was described as a "Fenian lover" and called "a disgrace to Protestants". The attackers later apologised.

He became bankrupt in 1982, but continued to be active on Belfast's music scene. However, in 2015 he closed his last remaining record shop due to ill health.

He lost an eye in an accident when six years old, and as of 2023 undergoes dialysis three times a week while maintaining a busy schedule.

== Media ==
In October 2010 his book Hooleygan was published by Blackstaff Press and was number four in the local charts at Christmas. A "Terri Hooley For Mayor Of Belfast" Facebook campaign was set up but he declined the offer saying: "There are enough fools in Belfast City Hall, they don't need another one."

A biopic based on his life, Good Vibrations, came out in 2013, starring Richard Dormer as Hooley.

As of 2022, Hooley presents a two hour radio programme of his musical choices on Saturdays from 10pm – 12am.
