= Keeney =

Keeney is a surname rooted largely in traditional Celtic Irish. This and similar names include Kinne, Keen, Keene, Keane, Kane, Kayne, Keaney, Keny, Keeny, Keyne, O'Kane, O'Keane, O'Cahan, Cahan, Kean, Kinney, O'Cain, Ó Cianaigh (the prefix "Ó" means "grandson of"), McClokey, McCluskey, and McClaskey. The Ó Catháin clan is related to the O'Neill dynasty of Ulster.

Roscoe C. Keeney Jr. (1922 - 2012), self-styled "Family Historian", noted on his website, "Whether the spelling be KINNE or KEENE or KINNEY or KEENEY or KEENY or another favorite spelling, we claim the same ancestry."

"Eeney" is a common Gaelic ending (cf. Sweeney, Feeney).

In the early 21st century, around 20,000 individuals with the surname Keeney lived in the United States.

Author and artist Rebekah (Voll) Keeney noted in her book Cornell Cabin Stories that in the Penn State Creamery Hall of Fame Flavors is a "Keeney Beany". A double-chocolate ice cream with chocolate chunks, it is named for professor emeritus Philip Keeney, a nationally recognized teacher and scientist in ice-cream and chocolate technology.

J.H. Keeney of Chicago was a manufacturer of jukeboxes and arcade machines.

== See also ==
- 19452 Keeney, a main-belt asteroid
