= Keene =

Keene may refer to:

== Places ==
In Canada

- Keene, Ontario, a small community in Ontario, Canada

In the United States

- Keene, California, a census-designated place
- Keene, Kansas, an unincorporated community
- Keene, Kentucky, a city
- Keene, Nebraska, an unincorporated community
- Keene, New Hampshire, city and county seat of Cheshire County
- Keene, New York, a town
- Keene, North Dakota, an unincorporated community
- Keene, Ohio, an unincorporated community
- Keene, Texas, a city
- Keene, Virginia, an unincorporated town community
- Keene, Wisconsin, an unincorporated community
- Keene Township (disambiguation)
- Keene Pond, pond in Duxbury, Massachusetts

== In education ==
- Keene State College, an institution of the University System of New Hampshire
- Keene High School, public high school located in Keene, New Hampshire
- Keene Independent School District, public school district based in Keene, Texas

== People ==
- Keene (surname), people with that name
- Keene Fitzpatrick (1864-1944), American track coach, athletic trainer, professor of physical training and gymnasium director considered "one of the pioneers of intercollegiate sport"

== Other uses ==
- Keene/Elmhirst's Resort Airport, airport near Keene, Ontario
- Keene & Simpson, American architectural firm
- Keene Swamp Bats, collegiate summer baseball team based in Keene, New Hampshire
- Keene, 1969 film starring Joseph Cotten

== See also ==
- Keen (disambiguation)
- Kene, a given name and surname
- Keane (disambiguation)
- Keenes, Illinois
- Keeney (surname)
