= Keane (surname) =

Keane is an English-language surname. Notable people with the surname include:

- Amelia Keane, American politician
- Augustus Henry Keane (1833–1912), Irish journalist and linguist
- Bil Keane (1922–2011), American cartoonist of The Family Circus
- Bob Keane (1922–2009), American musician, manager of Ritchie Valens
- Claire Keane (born 1979), illustrator
- Colin Keane (born 1994), Irish jockey
- Colm Keane (1951–2022), Irish broadcaster and author
- Dillie Keane (born 1952), one third of the Fascinating Aida comedy cabaret trio
- Dolores Keane (1953–2026), Irish folk singer
- Emma Keane, fictional character from Ackley Bridge
- Fergal Keane (born 1961), BBC correspondent based in South Africa
- Glen Keane (born 1954), American animator, son of Bil Keane
- Jack Keane (born 1943), U.S. Army general
- James Keane (disambiguation)
- Jayne Fenton Keane, Australian poet
- Jeff Keane, American comic strip artist, son of Bil Keane
- John Keane (disambiguation)
- Keith Keane (born 1986), Irish footballer
- Keane baronets, a baronetage for the Keane family of Waterford
- Margaret Keane (1927–2022), American painter of waif-like children with big eyes
  - Walter Keane (1915–2000), American plagiarist, sold her paintings as his own
- Mark Keane (disambiguation)
- Mervyn Keane (born 1953), Australian rules footballer
- Michael Keane (footballer, born 1982), Irish footballer
- Michael Keane (footballer, born 1993), English footballer
- Michael Keane (economist) (born 1961), Nuffield Professor of Economics at University of Oxford
- Mike Keane (born 1967), Canadian ice hockey player
- Molly Keane (1904–1996), Irish novelist
- Patrick Keane (born 1952), Australian lawyer and judge
- Paul Keane (born 1957), Australian actor
- Peter Keane (disambiguation)
- Richard J. Keane (1933–2008), New York politician
- Robbie Keane (born 1980), Irish footballer
- Robert Emmett Keane (1883–1981), American actor
- Rory Keane (1922–2004), Irish footballer
- Roy Keane (born 1971), Irish footballer
- Sara Keane (born 1991), American footballer
- Sarah Keane, President of the Olympic Federation of Ireland and CEO of Swim Ireland
- Seán Keane (fiddler) (1946–2023), Irish musician from the musical group The Chieftains
- Seán Keane (Irish politician) (1899–1953), Irish Labour Party politician represented Cork East
- Seán Keane (singer) (born 1961), Irish folk singer
- Sheana Keane (born 1975), Irish broadcaster
- Will Keane (born 1993), Irish footballer

== See also ==
- Keane (disambiguation)
- Kean
- O'Cahan
- Kane
- O'Kane
