= Kean =

Kean may refer to:

- Kean (name)
- Kean (play), 1838 play by Alexandre Dumas père based on the life of the actor Edmund Kean, and its adaptations:
  - Kean (1921 film), a German silent historical film
  - Kean (1924 film), a silent film directed by Alexandre Volkoff
  - Kean (1940 film), an Italian historical drama film
  - Kean, 1953 stage adaption by Jean-Paul Sartre
  - Kean: Genius or Scoundrel, 1956 Italian biographical drama film
  - Kean (musical), 1961 musical by Peter Stone, Robert Wright, and George Forrest
- Kean University, university in Union, New Jersey
  - Kean University-Wenzhou, satellite campus of Kean University in Zhejiang, China, the first Western university in the country
- KEAN-FM, a radio station in Abilene, Texas
- Ivanna Eudora Kean High School, high school in St. Thomas, Virgin Islands
- The Kean, apartment building in Detroit, Michigan

== See also ==
- Kean Commission or the 9/11 Commission
- Keane (disambiguation)
- Keen (disambiguation)
- Keene (disambiguation)
