= V2 =

The V-2 rocket was a German early ballistic missile of World War II.

V2 or V-2 may also refer to:

== Vehicles, craft, and ships ==
- Soviet submarine V-2
- V2, a prototype of the Panzer VIII Maus tank
- USS V-2, a 1924 Barracuda-class submarine of the United States Navy
- ARA Veinticinco de Mayo (V-2), an aircraft carrier in the Argentine Navy from 1969 to 1997
- Culver V-2, a two-seat cabin monoplane
- Fokker V.2, a German fighter aircraft prototype
- MIT EAD Airframe Version 2, the first ion wind airplane
- Voyager 2 spacecraft
- Dragon V2, a commercial spacecraft being developed for astronaut crew transport
- LNER Class V2, a British railway steam locomotive class
- NER Class V2, a class of British steam locomotives (later redesignated class Z)

== Engines ==
- Curtiss V-2, an American eight-cylinder aircraft engine
- Kharkiv model V-2, a Soviet twelve-cylinder tank engine
- V-twin engine, a two-cylinder engine

== Biology ==
- V2 receptor, a protein that acts as receptor for arginine vasopressin
- Maxillary nerve, (V_{2}), the second division of the trigeminal nerve
- Visual Area 2 of the Visual Cortex

== Science and technology ==
- V2 word order, the verb-second word order of Germanic languages and other languages
- Velocity 2 (V_{2} speed), aircraft safe-takeoff speed
- V_{2}, one of six precordial leads in electrocardiography
- Parameter describing the azimuthal anisotropy in heavy-ion collisions
- V-2 trailer, a mobile ground-controlled approach radar system element

== The arts ==
- "V-2 Schneider", a mostly instrumental piece on the 1977 David Bowie album Heroes
- V2 (album), second studio album (1978) by punk rock band the Vibrators
- "V2" (song), a single by That Petrol Emotion
- V2: Dead Angel, a 2007 Finnish film
- Sniper Elite V2, 2012 video game

== Businesses and products ==
- V2 Records, a record label founded by Richard Branson
- V2 Radio, a radio station set up as a local successor to the UKRD Group station in Sussex
- V2.fi, a Finnish gaming and entertainment-oriented website
- Byte (service), a short-form video hosting service formerly known as "v2"
- Hanlin eReader V2, an ebook reader
- V2 Cigs, a brand of electronic cigarettes

== Other ==
- Vatican II or Second Vatican Council (1962 - 1965)
- V2, Antigua & Barbuda's International Telecommunication Union prefix
- V2 Institute for the Unstable Media, a Rotterdam-based new media research institute
- ITU-T V.2, a telecommunications recommendation
- V2, a boss character from the video game Ultrakill

== See also ==
- 2V (disambiguation)
