= O'Kane =

O'Kane is an Irish surname, anglicised from the Irish Ó Catháin, and was the name of a significant clann in Ulster, a province of Ireland. The surname has also been anglicised as O'Cahan, Kane, O'Keane, O'Kean, O'Keen, O'Keene, Keen, Keene, Kain, O'Kaine, and similar variations thereof. They are descended from Eógan, son of Niall of the Nine Hostages. In the late Middle Ages, they were the primary sept under the Ó Néill clann of Ulster, holding the privilege of inaugurating the Chief of the Ó Néill.

== People ==
- Aidan O'Kane
- Damien O'Kane
- Dene O'Kane
- Deirdre O'Kane
- Eunan O'Kane
- Gary O'Kane
- Gerard O'Kane
- Jake O'Kane
- John O'Kane
- Liam O'Kane
- Maggie O'Kane
- Marty O'Kane
- Mick O'Kane
- Paddy O'Kane
- Richard O'Kane
- Sean O'Kane

== See also ==
- O'Cahan
- USS O'Kane (DDG-77)
- O'Kane Market and O'Kane Building, Monroe County, New York
- The O'Kanes
