= Wanda R. Smith High School =

Location
- 404 Charger Drive; Keene, Texas 76059-0656; United States

Information
- School type: Public high school
- Established: 1989
- School district: Keene Independent School District
- Principal: Blake Rice
- Teaching staff: 35.84 (FTE)
- Grades: 9-12
- Enrollment: 367 (2023-2024)
- Student to teacher ratio: 10.24
- Colors: Blue & white
- Athletics conference: UIL Class AAA
- Mascot: Keene Chargers
- Website: Wanda R. Smith High School

Wanda R. Smith High School, formerly Keene High School (KHS), is a public high school located in Keene, Texas, United States. It is classified as a 3A school by the UIL. It is part of the Keene Independent School District located in central Johnson County. In 2015, the school was rated "Met Standard" by the Texas Education Agency. The school has been given a bronze rating from U.S. News & World Report, which ranked it as one of the best schools in Texas.

== History ==
Students in Keene were served by Cleburne High School prior to the establishment of Keene High School, which saw its first graduating class in 1991. The school was renamed in 2015 in honor of Wanda R. Smith, former superintendent of Keene ISD.

== Campus ==
Wanda R. Smith High School is part of the district campus which includes the elementary, intermediate, and junior high schools. The high school facilities include 20 classrooms, a library, a gymnasium, a cross country course, and a field with a track. Currently new facilities are being built to expand the size of the campus.

== Athletics ==
The Keene Chargers compete in these sports: football, volleyball, cross country, basketball, soccer, golf, tennis, track, baseball, and softball.

== Extracurricular activities ==
Student groups and activities include FCCLA, FFA, International Thespian Society, JWAC, National Honor Society, and student council.
