= Keene Adventist Elementary School =

Location
- 32.397257°N 97.321787°W

Information
- Type: Private
- Motto: With God We Soar Like Eagles
- Established: January 1893
- Principal: Michael Todd Coulter
- Grades: PK-8
- Enrollment: 185 (2017)
- Colors: Blue and Silver
- Affiliation: Seventh-day Adventist Church
- Website: kaes4kids

Keene Adventist Elementary School (KAES) is a Seventh-day Adventist co-educational PK-8 elementary school located in Keene, Texas. The school is operated by the Texas Conference of Seventh-day Adventists and the Keene Seventh-day Adventist Church to make available Christian education. It is a part of the Seventh-day Adventist education system, the world's second largest Christian school system.

== History ==
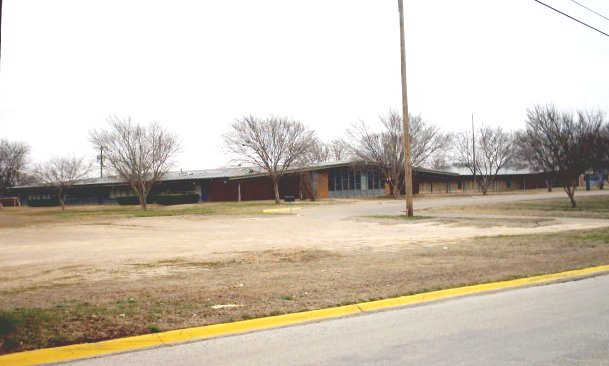
Keene Adventist Elementary School

On January 7, 1894, when "The Texas Academy" opened its doors to welcome the first students, grades one through twelve were included. The students were separated into two groups, the academy grades and the elementary grades. Professor C.B. Hughes was principal for the entire student body, but devoted his time to the academy students. Mrs. Flora Williams and her daughter taught the elementary grades. For the first few years the salaries of the elementary teachers were paid by the state. Both groups of students were in the same building, occupying different rooms. The enrollment in the new school increased so rapidly that it was necessary to erect a new building to accommodate administrative and classroom facilities. The elementary grades were located in the new building. As the enrollment continued to grow, the academy grades needed more classrooms. To provide for this growth, the academy board authorized the construction of a separated building for the elementary grades. It was named the normal building, and was located on the north-east corner of the campus. Through the years the elementary department of the school at Keene continued to grow along with the academy and the college. In November 1949 after three years of investigating and planning, work was begun on a new building for the elementary. The new Demonstration School was built with a limited budget by student labor under the supervision of Ed E. Seamount, builder, and J. Randall Sloop, business manager of the college, for half of what it would have cost as a contracted job. The school later became known as Ella E. Hughes Elementary School of Southwestern Junior College. In 1966, the school would make one more move to its present location on pecan street and the name changed to Keene Adventist Elementary School. The school operates as a ministry of the Keene Seventh-day Adventist Church and provides Christian education for children grades Pre-Kinder through eighth grade. KAES as it is also called, offers music, technology, PE to round out a strong academic program.

== Governance ==
The school is operated by a school board and is affiliated with the Keene Seventh-day Adventist Church.

== Athletic programs ==
Keene Adventist Elementary School's athletic programs include Girls and Boys JH Basketball, JH Gymnastics, JH Soccer, JH Volleyball, Girls and Boys Elementary Basketball, Elementary Soccer, Elementary Volleyball, Elementary Gymnastics.

== Curriculum ==
The schools curriculum consists primarily of the standard courses taught at Elementary Schools and college preparatory schools across the world. All students are required to take classes in the core areas of English, Basic Sciences, Mathematics, and Social Sciences. In addition, religion classes are mandated on a yearly basis.

== School Paper ==
The school has a weekly news publication titled KONNECTIONS for the events on campus which include classroom & Athletics Newsletters, Calendars & Announcement's.

== Accreditation ==
KAES is accredited by the Board of Regents of the General Conference of Seventh-day Adventists, and the Texas Private Schools Accreditation Commission (TEPSAC).

== Administration ==
- Michael Todd Coulter, Principal
- Mimi Samaniego, Secretary
- Lisa Turk, treasurer

== Students ==
The student population is around 200. Upon graduation, many students continue their education at Chisholm Trail Academy. In years past there were more students attending but the population has gradually declined after the arrival of uniforms. In the 2017-2018 school year, the student population rests at 185.

== See also ==
- List of Seventh-day Adventist secondary schools
- Seventh-day Adventist education
