= Genius Move =

Single by That Petrol Emotion
- B-side: "Party Games"
- Released: October 1987
- Genre: Indie rock
- Length: 3:18
- Label: Virgin Records
- Songwriter: Ciaran McLaughlin
- Producer: Roli Mosimann

That Petrol Emotion singles chronology
"Swamp" (1987)	"Genius Move" (1987)	"Cellophane" (1988)

"Genius Move" is a 1987 non-album single by That Petrol Emotion.

== Track listing 7" ==
=== Side A ===
Side A
No.	Title	Written by	Length
1.	"Genius Move"	Ciaran McLaughlin

Side B
No.	Title	Written by	Length
1.	"Party Games"	John O'Neill

== Track listing 12" ==
Side A
No.	Title	Written by	Length
1.	"Genius Move"	Ciaran McLaughlin

Side B
No.	Title	Written by	Length
1.	"Party Games"	John O'Neill
2.	"Mouth Crazy (Live)"	John O'Neill

== Personnel ==
- "Genius Move" produced by Roli Mosimann, remixed by John Leckie
- "Party Games" produced by Barry Andrews for the Janice Long Radio 1 show.
- "Mouthcrazy (Live)" produced by Mike Johnson
- Steve Mack: Vocals
- John O'Neill: Guitar
- Raymond O'Gorman: Guitar
- Damian O'Neill: Bass Guitar
- Ciaran McLaughlin: Drums
