= Keen =

Keen, Keen's, or Keens may refer to:

== People ==
- Keen (surname)
- Thomas Keens (1870-1953), British politician

== Music and song ==
- "Keen" (song), a single by That Petrol Emotion
- Keen Records, American record label
- Keening, traditional Irish lament

== Companies ==
- Keen (shoe company), United States manufacturing company
- Keen's, Australian food brand
- Keen Engineering, Canadian consulting engineering firm
- Keens Steakhouse, a restaurant in New York City

== Video games ==
- "Keening", tool in video game The Elder Scrolls III: Morrowind
- Commander Keen, a series of video games developed by id Software in the early 1990s

== Other uses ==
- KEEN-CD, a low-power television station (channel 17) licensed to Las Vegas, Nevada, United States
- KZSF, former call sign KEEN, a radio station licensed to San Jose, California, United States
- Dillant–Hopkins Airport, ICAO code as KEEN, near Keene, New Hampshire, United States

== See also ==
- Keene (disambiguation)
- Kene
- Keane (disambiguation)
- Keening the traditional Irish and Scottish lament for the dead
