= Fokker V.1 =

German sesquiplane experimental fighter

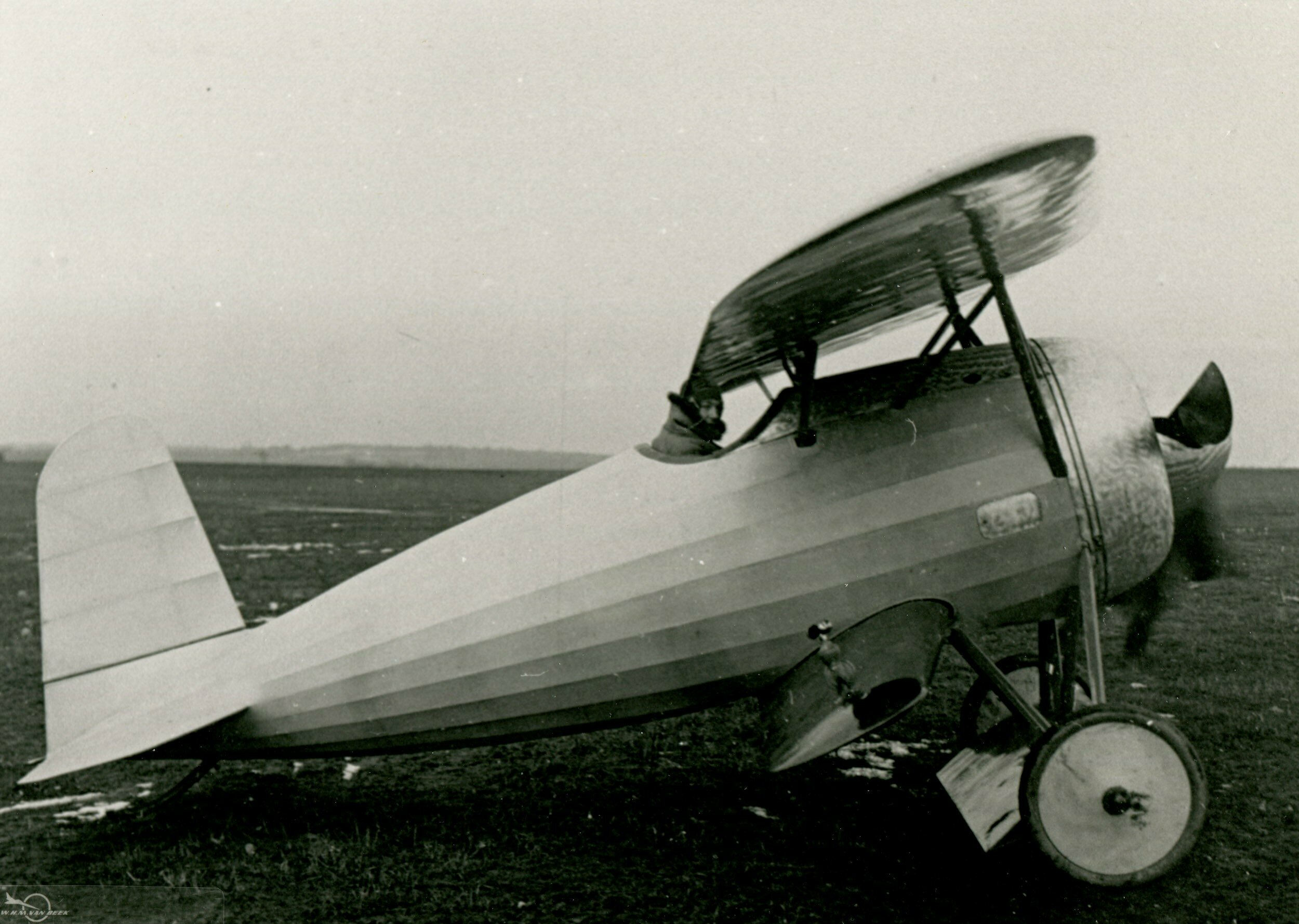
- Anthony Fokker in the cockpit of the V.1

General information
- Type: Fighter aircraft
- Manufacturer: Fokker-Flugzeugwerke
- Designer: Reinhold Platz
- Number built: 1

History
- First flight: 1916
- Variant: Fokker V.2

The Fokker V.1 was a small German sesquiplane experimental fighter prototype built in 1916 by the Fokker-Flugzeugwerke. Sporting a parasol wing, it was the first Fokker aircraft purportedly designed by Reinhold Platz—the respective roles played by Fokker himself, Platz, and possibly others in the conceptual design of Fokker airplanes are a matter of dispute among historians—and was an early experiment in cantilever wing construction, eliminating the bracing wires typical of aircraft design at the time, something that had already been achieved with metal materials in Hugo Junkers' own pioneering Junkers J 1 in 1915.

== Design ==
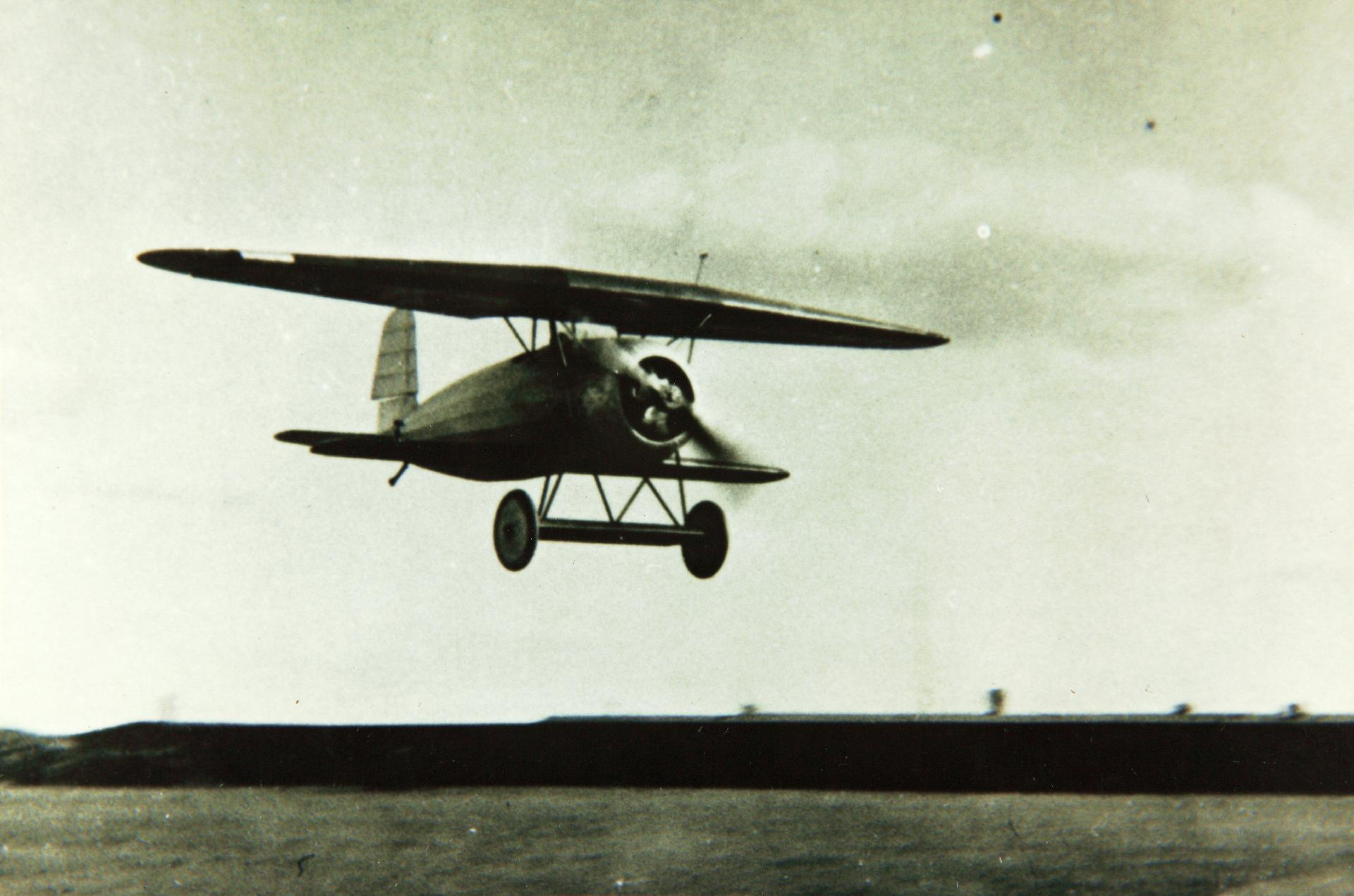

The Fokker V.1 principal innovation was its unbraced cantilever wings. These were built around a pair of wooden box-girders, the upper and lower members of which were built up from several thin strips of pine, with connecting webs of birch plywood. The entire wing was covered in plywood, an innovation probably suggested to Fokker by a Swedish aeronautical engineer, Villehad Forssman, who had previously designed one of Germany's earliest multi-engined military aircraft; the V.1 upper wing's smooth surface, thick airfoil and tapered planform gave it a remarkably modern appearance. The depth of spar needed for adequate strength necessitated a wing whose root thickness was around 20% of the chord, in contrast to a typical value of around 6% for aircraft of the period and 12 to 15% for modern aircraft of comparable performance. The spars of the upper wing were parallel but those of the lower wing converged to meet at the wingtips. The intention of this was to provide a well for the fitting of a retractable undercarriage at a later date. Ailerons were fitted to the upper wing only and these were unusual in that the entire wing-tip being a separate component, and was pivoted, much like the French Blériot VIII of 1908 had done, to provide a control surface. To further Platz's desire for an aerodynamically clean aircraft, all control actuators were buried within the wing, so that there were no drag-creating control horns. The upper wing was mounted on a system of cabane struts consisting of a pair of tubular steel tripods between the fuselage and mainspar and a pair of steel struts connected to the aft spar, all basically similar to the cabane strut design for the later, likewise Platz-designed Fokker D.VI and Fokker D.VII biplane descendants — each of which also used one "N-pattern" interplane strut set per side — and the Fokker D.VIII parasol-wing monoplane descendant of the V.1. Unlike the later D.VI and D.VII, there were no interplane struts on the outer areas of the V.1's wing panels. Since Platz was using a novel and thick aerofoil, much like the contemporary cantilever-winged Junkers J 1 all-metal monoplane pioneered nearly a year earlier, he was unsure about the correct incidence for the wing with respect to the fuselage. Lacking a wind tunnel, he therefore made it adjustable during flight.

The fuselage structure was the usual Fokker wire-braced rectangular section box girder made from welded steel tubes. This was then enclosed within circular wooden formers bearing longitudinal stringers and covered with fabric. The tail surfaces were all-moving, without a fixed fin or horizontal stabiliser. The aircraft was powered by a 75 kW (100 hp) Oberursel U.I rotary engine.

In the case of the V.1 the V did not stand for Versuchs (experimental), but for Verspannungslos (literally "without struts"), or cantilever. The aircraft was so small it was nicknamed "Floh" or flea, like a similarly small, DFW-built prototype airframe of the era.

== Variants ==
It was Fokker's practice to develop rotary and inline engined variants of the company's designs. Accordingly, a second similar aircraft powered by a 120 hp (90 kW) Mercedes D.II was constructed, the Fokker V.2. The aircraft differed principally in having an increased wing area to compensate for the increased weight of the engine and Albatros D.III-outline shape open structure, fabric-covered conventional tail surfaces.

== Specifications ==
Data from

General characteristics

- Crew: 1
- Length: 5.64 m (18 ft 6 in)
- Upper wingspan: 8.00 m (26 ft 3 in)
- Lower wingspan: 5.56 m (18 ft 3 in) (Linear dimensions scaled from drawing.)
- Powerplant: 1 × Oberursel U.1, 75 kW (100 hp)

Performance Armament

- 2x Spandau machine guns

== Bibliography ==
- Herris, Jack & Phillips, Taz (2021). Fokker Aircraft of WWI: Volume 4: V.1–V.8, F.I & Dr.I: A Centennial Perspective on Great War Airplanes. Great War Aviation Centennial Series. Vol. 54. n.p.: Aeronaut Books. ISBN 978-1-953201-08-9.
- Weyl, A.J. Fokker: The Creative Years. London: Putnam, 1965.
