= Fireproof (That Petrol Emotion album) =

Studio album by That Petrol Emotion
- Released: 1993
- Studios: Protocol, mixed at Matrix & Maison Rouge. Additional recording & mixing at Townhouse, Greenhouse & Bang Bang
- Genres: Alternative rock, indie rock
- Labels: Koogat; Rykodisc
- Producers: That Petrol Emotion, Bryan Martin

That Petrol Emotion chronology
Chemicrazy (1990)	Fireproof (1993)	Final Flame (Fire, Detonation And Sublime Chaos) (2000)

2000 reissue cover

Fireproof is the fifth and last studio album by Irish rock band That Petrol Emotion, released in 1993.

== Critical reception ==
Professional ratings
Review scores
Source	Rating
AllMusic	3/5 stars
The Encyclopedia of Popular Music	3/5 stars
MusicHound Rock: The Essential Album Guide	4/5 stars

MusicHound Rock: The Essential Album Guide listed Fireproof among the band's best work, writing that "Steve Mack's tart, cynical voice is the perfect vehicle for the razor-sharp lyrics." Trouser Press wrote that "the droney, melody-deprived rockers can’t get by strictly on drive, and the album’s parallel attempt to advance the quintet’s Beatlesque pop aspirations is also stymied." Billboard praised the "bruising guitar-driven sound that always stays within the white lines of melody."

== Track listing ==
No.	Title	Written by	Length
1.	"Detonate My Dreams"	C. McLaughlin	4:45
2.	"Catch a Fire"	C. McLaughlin, R. O'Gorman	4:30
3.	"Last of the True Believers"	C. McLaughlin, R. O'Gorman	5:08
4.	"Too Late Blues"	D. O'Neill, R. O'Gorman	3:48
5.	"7th Wave"	C. McLaughlin	3:13
6.	"Infinite Thrill"	C. McLaughlin	4:28
7.	"Speed of Light"	C. McLaughlin	4:00
8.	"Shangri-La"	C. McLaughlin, R. O'Gorman	3:51
9.	"Heartbeat Mosaic"	D. O'Neill, R. O'Gorman	4:11
10.	"Metal Mystery"	C. McLaughlin, R. O'Gorman	4:05

2000 reissue remastered bonus tracks also available on downloads
No.	Title	Written by	Length
12.	"Everlasting Breath" (Alternate version)	D. O'Neill	4:40
13.	"Last of the True Believers" (Alternate version)	C. McLaughlin, R. O'Gorman	4:45
14.	"Shangri-La" (Alternate version)	C. McLaughlin, R. O'Gorman	4:41
15.	"Speed of Light" (Alternate version)	C. McLaughlin	4:02
16.	"Detonate My Dreams" (Alternate version)	C. McLaughlin	4:45

== Personnel ==
That Petrol Emotion

- Steve Mack – vocals
- Damian O'Neill – guitar
- Raymond O'Gorman – guitar
- Brendan Kelly – bass
- Ciaran McLaughlin – drums

with:

- Neil Herd – pedal steel
- Paul Brewer – engineer (initial tracking)
