= KJRN =

Christian radio station in Keene, Texas

Coordinates: 32.405°N 97.332°W

KJRN-FM
- Keene, Texas; United States
- Broadcast area: Johnson County, southern Tarrant County
- Frequency: 88.3 MHz
- Branding: 88.3 The Journey

Programming
- Format: Christian adult contemporary

Ownership
- Owner: Southwestern Adventist University

History
- First air date: 1974 as KSUC
- Former call signs: KSUC (1974–1984); KJCR (1984–2010)

Technical information
- Licensing authority: FCC
- Facility ID: 61585
- Class: C3
- ERP: 2,300 watts
- HAAT: 81 meters

Links
- Public license information: Public file; LMS
- Webcast: Listen Live
- Website: 883thejourney.org

KJRN (88.3 FM) is a non-commercial radio station licensed to Keene, Texas. The station broadcasts a Christian adult contemporary radio format and calls itself "88.3 The Journey." KJRN is owned by Southwestern Adventist University. The DJs consist of both full-time on-air talent and part-time university students. Studios are on the campus on North College Drive and the transmitter is a short distance away off North Old Betsy Road. The signal of the station covers much of Johnson County, part of southern Tarrant County, and can be heard in the southwestern section of the Dallas–Fort Worth metroplex.

== History ==
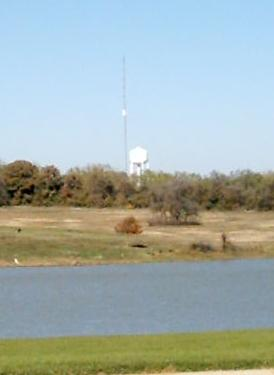
View of KJCR transmission tower taken from N. Old Betsy Road

The idea for a radio station was proposed in 1968. A gift to the college by Arkansas radio pioneer Raymond Beem financed the station's start-up costs; station planning began in 1973.

The station began as KSUC (for Southwestern Union College) in 1974. The 88.3 frequency was chosen because it rhymed with the call letters. The studios were located in the school's Heritage Hall in a dorm room.

By 1984, station management decided to abandon the KSUC call letters as the name of the college had changed, and applied for replacement calls KJCR, and the station moved from the dorm room to the studios at 304 N. College Drive.

On May 5, 1989, 110-mile per hour winds toppled the station's transmitter, destroying 60 feet of tower sections and two of four antenna elements. In two days the station returned to the air under temporary authorization on a 75-foot tower at 925 watts. Construction began on a new 180' tower by the fall, and was put into use on May 18, 1990. A power increase was granted for 4,000 watts with an ERP of 2,300 watts directed to the west.

In November 1999, KJCR began broadcasting 24 hours a day with the aid of voicetracking software during overnight hours.

On September 3, 2009, around 9:30 pm the KJCR studios suffered from a fire attributed to lightning. Four fire departments responded and the fire was contained primarily to the attic; however, the station was knocked off the air and over $90,000 in equipment was damaged. Broadcasts resumed the next day from temporary studios.

In May 2010, KJCR went silent to prepare for a station re-launch. It was re-licensed as KJRN on June 17, 2010.

On 1 Nov 2010, 88.3 The Journey was born, playing a mix of Adult Contemporary Christian music under the direction of a new general manager. Two new studios were constructed with equipment including new audio consoles and an upgraded automation system. On-air staff consists of students from the communications department of the University.
