= Babble (That Petrol Emotion album) =

Studio album by That Petrol Emotion
- Released: 1987
- Studio: Jam, London N4; Livingston, Wood Green, London
- Genre: Post-punk
- Length: 33:55
- Label: Polydor
- Producer: Roli Mosimann

That Petrol Emotion chronology
Manic Pop Thrill (1986)	Babble (1987)	End of the Millennium Psychosis Blues (1988)

Babble is the second album by the Northern Irish band That Petrol Emotion, released in 1987. The album was re-released in 2001 and in 2010. It peaked at No. 30 in the UK. The band supported the album with a North American tour.

== Production ==
The album was produced by Roli Mosimann. The liner notes include an essay about the Prevention of Terrorism Acts. Singer Steve Mack was influenced by the Isley Brothers, who melded political messages to danceable music.

== Critical reception ==
Professional ratings
Review scores
Source	Rating
AllMusic	4.5/5 stars
Robert Christgau	A−
The Encyclopedia of Popular Music	4/5 stars
The Gazette	7.8/10
Los Angeles Daily News	A
Los Angeles Times	3.5/4 stars
The Philadelphia Inquirer	2/4 stars
Record Collector	4/4 stars
The Rolling Stone Album Guide	4/5 stars

The New York Times wrote: "Guitar riffs like corkscrews, like barbed wire, like punching bags and like trampolines animate the music of That Petrol Emotion, a five-man Irish band with a fiercely defiant streak." The Philadelphia Inquirer noted that the "abrasiveness is held in check by strong guitar playing and clear melodies." The Vancouver Sun called "Big Decision" "one of the year's great singles."

The Los Angeles Times determined that, "though characterized by stun guitar, howling vocals and brutal beats, the album always keeps you on your toes with an eclectic though unrefined array of styles." The Washington Post deemed it "a fierce yet tuneful postpunk landmark." The Gazette concluded that "this is about being alive in Northern Ireland, and it's no day on the beach... Bracing stuff." The Windsor Star listed it among the best albums of 1987.

MusicHound Rock: The Essential Album Guide praised the "smart, angry songs" and "eclectic sound."

== Track listing ==
No.	Title	Written by	Length
1.	"Swamp"	John O'Neill	3:20
2.	"Spin Cycle"	Steve Mack	2:05
3.	"For What It's Worth"	Damian O'Neill, Réamann Ó'Gorman	3:56
4.	"Big Decision"	John O'Neill	2:41
5.	"Static"	Damian O'Neill	3:34
6.	"Split!"	Ciaran McLaughlin	1:37
7.	"Belly Bugs"	That Petrol Emotion	2:42
8.	"In the Playpen"	Ciaran McLaughlin	2:31
9.	"Inside"	John O'Neill, Réamann O'Gorman	4:11
10.	"Chester Burnette"	Sean O'Neill	2:41
11.	"Creeping to the Cross"	Ciaran McLaughlin	4:37
Total length:			33:55

2001 Polydor CD remastered bonus tracks also available on downloads
No.	Title	Written by	Length
12.	"Big Decision" (Extended version)	John O'Neill	4:38
13.	"Swamp" (Extended remix)	Sean O'Neill	4:00
14.	"Creeping to the Cross" (7 inch edit)	Ciaran McLaughlin	2:46
15.	"Soul Deep" (B-side)	John O'Neill	3:07
16.	"Dance Your Ass Off" (B-side)	Hamilton Bohannon	3:08
Total length:			51:34

== Personnel ==
- Steve Mack – vocals
- John O'Neill – guitar
- Raymond O'Gorman – guitar
- Damian O'Neill – bass guitar
- Ciaran McLaughlin – drums
