= Arnold School Pond =

Lake in Massachusetts

- Location within Massachusetts
- Location: Pembroke, Massachusetts
- Coordinates: 42°05′34″N 70°45′21″W
- Primary outflows: unnamed stream
- Basin countries: United States
- Surface area: 12 acres (4.9 ha)
- Settlements: East Pembroke

Arnold School Pond is a 12-acre (49,000 m^{2}) pond in Pembroke, Massachusetts in the East Pembroke section of the town. The pond is located northeast of Stump Pond, behind the Arnold Elementary School. The outflow is an unnamed stream that leads to Pudding Brook.
