= 2V =

2V or 2-V may refer to:

- 2V, IATA code for Amtrak
- 2V angle, curved isogyre differences in a conoscopic interference pattern in optical crystallography
- P-2V, a model of Lockheed P-2 Neptune
- An-2V, a model of Antonov An-2
- 2V (V-69), manufacturer's designation for Venera 5 spacecraft
- 2VLY, call sign for Power FM 98.1

== See also ==
- V2 (disambiguation)
