= That Petrol Emotion =

Northern Irish post punk band

- Origin: Derry, Northern Ireland
- Genres: Post-punk: garage rock; indie rock
- Years active: 1984–1994; 2008–2010
- Labels: Polydor, Virgin, Koogat
- Past members: Raymond Gorman; Brendan Kelly; Steve Mack; John Marchini; Ciaran McLaughlin; Damian O'Neill; John O'Neill

That Petrol Emotion was a London-based rock band formed in 1984 by musicians from Northern Ireland with an American vocalist. They recorded five albums between 1986 and 1994, exploring an eclectic fusion of indie rock, post-punk, garage rock and dance-punk, which anticipated both the dance-pop era of the early 1990s and the post-punk revival of the early 2000s. They were described by Rolling Stone magazine as "The Clash crossed with Creedence", and by The New York Times as "a youthful Rolling Stones" crossed with a "revved-up Television". Following a fourteen-year break, the band reunited in 2008 for various dates, tours and festival appearances before returning to hiatus in 2010.

== Career ==
"[We had to] make our stance from the beginning; we had to say ' Right, we're from Northern Ireland. Our name is deliberately meant to sum up a whole feeling of frustration and anger that you feel living there.'"

— John O'Neill, reflecting on the inspiration for the band's name and the lyrical content of much of their material. October 1987.

=== Formation and debut single ===
Following the breakup of celebrated pop-punk band the Undertones, the band's former guitarist and principal songwriter, John O'Neill, returned to his hometown of Derry and teamed up with friend and fellow guitarist Raymond Gorman (previously in Bam Bam and the Calling) to DJ together at the Left Bank club. Inspired by the records they were playing, the two formed a new songwriting project which evolved into a new band, eventually playing a couple of gigs with a drum machine and Gorman's then-girlfriend as singer. Another friend, drummer Ciaran McLaughlin (formerly with the Corner Boys, but who had also played a few Undertones gigs covering for an absent Billy Doherty) was the next member to join. In autumn 1984, the nascent That Petrol Emotion relocated to London, where the existing three members were joined by John's brother and former Undertones lead guitarist Damian O'Neill, who, desperate to join, agreed to switch to bass guitar. The line-up was completed after an audition by Seattle-born American singer Steve Mack, on a year out from his studies and working in a pizzeria in London at the time. In 2020, comedian Paul Whitehouse revealed that he had unsuccessfully auditioned for the band during this period.

After signing with an independent record label called the Pink Label, the band released their debut single, "Keen", in July 1985. That Petrol Emotion's influences encompassed artists as diverse as the Beatles, Afrika Bambaataa, Television, Sly & the Family Stone, Captain Beefheart and Can, and the sound of the new band severed overt musical links with the Undertones due to its darker, more edgy sound. That Petrol Emotion were also far more political and outspoken than the Undertones had been, by examining issues relating to the Troubles in their songwriting, and the Irish members listing their names in their preferred non-Anglicized forms on sleeve art. Gorman would later describe the band as having been "like the Undertones after discovering drugs, literature and politics, with a lot more girls in the audience dancing." As with the Undertones, John O'Neill emerged as principal songwriter, although songwriting contributions were made by all group members.

=== Manic Pop Thrill and Babble ===
That Petrol Emotion spent 1985 gigging in small venues, becoming "ridiculously popular on the pub circuit", and releasing a second single, "V2", in September on their own short-lived label, Noiseanoise. After signing a new deal with Demon Records, their debut album, Manic Pop Thrill, was released in 1986 and reached the number 1 spot on the UK indie chart. It was received with rave reviews from the critics, especially by known Undertones champion John Peel.

In 1987, the band made their major label debut when Polydor Records put out their second album, Babble, which broke into the mainstream UK albums chart and won universal acclaim, being voted as one of the albums of the year by Rolling Stone and receiving an A-minus score from Robert Christgau. In the UK, the single "Big Decision" peaked at number 42, which would be the band's highest chart position for a single release. Demonstrating an intensification of the band's political stance, the back sleeve of "Big Decision" had contained text criticising the Diplock courts in Northern Ireland and their potential ability to convict on false or forced confessions. 27 years later, Gorman would comment that "with regard to the politics and having grown up with Protestants, my thing was always to go back to civil rights. To make people understand that the only reason the IRA were in existence in the first place was due to the intransigence of the British and the Unionists. The whole situation in Northern Ireland is too difficult to explain and hard for most outsiders to grasp. Once we started talking about politics the music almost became secondary". In an interview that year, Mack would state that the inspiration of much of the lyrical content of That Petrol Emotion's material had been to "give you the dirt [about] what's really happening".

The next TPE single of 1987, the non-album track "Genius Move", was banned from being aired by the BBC due to a reference in the sleeve artwork to Sinn Féin politician Gerry Adams, a hated figure within the UK establishment at the time due to his suspected links with the IRA, which would lead to his voice being banned from British media between 1988 and 1994. Gorman has since pointed out that "there was no need for any reference to [Adams] 'cos the quote was from Liam Mellows, but I think it had been left to our tour manager to sort out the sleeve and without thinking he included a reference to Adams' book. It will haunt us forever that one. Pretty poor excuse all the same to ban us/the single; pathetic, really; however, no one knew we were banned as they didn't make a fuss a la Frankie Goes to Hollywood, very smart on their part."

By this stage, That Petrol Emotion had won the praise of significant alternative rock figures such as Robert Smith of the Cure and Robin Guthrie of Cocteau Twins. However, the band's failure to gain further hit singles led to problems with Polydor when personnel at the label's management changed during this period. Following demands made to the band to deliver immediate hit singles, That Petrol Emotion exploited a loophole in their contract and left Polydor, only to be snapped up within a few weeks by Virgin Records.

=== Lineup shuffle: End of the Millennium Psychosis Blues and Chemicrazy ===
On the eve of the recording sessions for their third album, John O'Neill declared his intentions to leave the band. Although he stayed to record the album, the sessions were fraught with tension and foreboding. Gorman would later call O'Neill's departure "a complete bombshell", saying "when I look back now, we should have thrown him out there and then and got on with the new recording ourselves. Instead we meekly accepted everything and he hung around for another three or four months. It was a toxic situation."

Upon its release in 1988, End of the Millennium Psychosis Blues was met with confusion by critics and fans alike. Its diversity of styles was meant to emulate the eclectic mixtapes the band loved and listened to on their tour bus, but their continued experiments with dance music ("Groove Check", "Here It Is... Take It!", "Tension") mixed with heavy alternative rock ("Goggle Box", "Under the Sky"), Celtic ballads ("Cellophane"), and indie ("Sooner or Later", "Every Little Bit") was considered at the time to be too disjointed and far-ranging to break into the mainstream. More recently, however, the album has been reappraised, with many critics and fans realizing that the band were ahead of their time, and, due to their penchant for mixing indie rock with elements of dance music and funk, were trailblazers for the Madchester indie-dance scene.

Having completed tour dates to promote the album, John O'Neill left That Petrol Emotion in October 1988, and a shuffle took place in the band's lineup. McLaughlin and Gorman took over the role of primary songwriters, whilst John Marchini (who had covered on guitar for an ailing Gorman on some of the tour dates) joined on bass guitar to allow Damian O'Neill to take up the guitar alongside Gorman. This new dynamic led to the 1990 album Chemicrazy, which was produced by Scott Litt and showcased a more straightforward rock style than before, while also maintaining a pure pop heart, exemplified by its singles "Sensitize", "Hey Venus", and "Tingle". Frustratingly for the band, however, the predicted massive sales for Chemicrazy never happened; the album stalled at number 62 in the UK, and its disappointing performance led to the band being dropped by Virgin.

=== Independence: Fireproof and split ===
After touring for Chemicrazy, That Petrol Emotion parted company with Marchini, and Belfast-born Brendan Kelly was brought in to play bass. The band set up their own record label, Koogat, which released their fifth album, Fireproof, in 1993. Like their debut album, Fireproof reached number 1 on the UK Indie Chart, but despite generally-positive press coverage, and the loyal fan base they had garnered over ten years, TPE was failing to attain the level of sustained commercial success or popularity enjoyed by contemporaries such as My Bloody Valentine and Sonic Youth. As a result, the band split amicably in 1994. A documentary of their farewell concerts in London and Dublin was released posthumously in 2000 as Final Flame (Fire, Detonation and Sublime Chaos).

Following the band's breakup, McLaughlin played in a jazz group for a while before switching to guitar and performing as a solo singer-songwriter. Mack returned to Seattle, where he played bass with a group called Cantona, and later formed Anodyne with fellow songwriter Harris Thurmond; an Anodyne album, Tensor, was released in 1998, but due to another band claiming use of the name, the project took on the name Marfa Lights in European markets. Gorman, Kelly and Damian O'Neill formed a new band called Wavewalkers in 1996, which played six shows in London, Derry and Paris before splitting up (Gorman would later resurrect the name for a solo project). In 2000, Damian O'Neill released a 12-inch single, "Higher Grace", under the name of X-Valdez, featuring arrangements by Xavier Jamaux and vocals by Athena Constantine; he then signed to Alan McGee's post-Creation label, Poptones, and released an album of experimental electronic music under the name A Quiet Revolution. John O'Neill had already formed the intermittently-active Northern Irish trip hop band Rare in 1990, scoring a hit single in 1996 with "Something Wild", and releasing a lone album, Peoplefreak, in 1998.

In November 1999, the O'Neill brothers reunited in a new version of the Undertones (original frontman Feargal Sharkey declined to participate) which continues to perform and release records to this day.

=== Reunion ===
On 26 March 2008, Mack announced that That Petrol Emotion were reforming (in their Fireproof lineup) to play reunion concerts later that year. In August 2008, the reunited band played London's The Boston Arms and Dundalk's Spirit Store, then went on to play at the Electric Picnic festival in Stradbally, Ireland.

In March 2009, the band played at the South by Southwest festival in Austin, Texas. In the same month, they announced a July UK tour on their official site, including a slot at the Hop Farm Festival in Kent, along with stints at the Oxegen Festival in Ireland and T in the Park in Scotland. They ended the year with a spot at All Tomorrow's Parties' Nightmare Before Christmas festival (curated by My Bloody Valentine) in December, followed by dates in the UK and the US.

=== Hiatus (2010-present) and spinoff band The Everlasting Yeah (2012-present) ===
Since 2010, That Petrol Emotion have been on an indefinite hiatus, due to Mack choosing to stay in Seattle and concentrate on parental duties. Gorman, Kelly, McLaughlin, and Damian O'Neill continued working together, initially with the intention of carrying on the existing band, but announced in 2012 that they had formed a new band named the Everlasting Yeah, playing Krautrock-influenced music. The new band's debut gig was in support of The June Brides in London, while their debut album, Anima Rising, was released on their own label, Infinite Thrill, in 2014. Via crowdfunding, Damian O'Neill recorded an album titled Refit Revise Reprise in 2018, calling the new group Damian O'Neill and the Monotones.

In 2022, the Demon sublabel Edsel issued a box set entitled "Every Beginning Has a Future: An Anthology 1984–1994", which includes of all the band's albums, with the majority of their b-sides and remixes added as bonus tracks.

== Legacy ==
That Petrol Emotion's body of work remains critically acclaimed within the music press. It is widely agreed that, while never achieving chart success or high sales figures, the band left a lasting influence on the Madchester and Britpop movements, specifically on such artists as The Stone Roses, Happy Mondays, Manic Street Preachers, Andrew Bird, Spoon, Blur and Radiohead. They were posthumously described as having perfected "the art of the scuzzed up alternative pop song" during the 1980s.

== Discography ==
=== Albums ===
- Manic Pop Thrill (Demon Records - May 1986) UK No. 84
- Babble (Polydor Records - May 1987) UK No. 30
- End of the Millennium Psychosis Blues (Virgin Records - September 1988) UK No. 53
- Chemicrazy (Virgin Records - April 1990) UK No. 62
- Fireproof (Koogat - 1993)
- Final Flame (Fire, Detonation and Sublime Chaos) (live album) (Sanctuary Records - 2000)

=== Singles and EPs ===
- "Keen" (The Pink Label - July 1985)
- "V2" (Noiseanoise - September 1985)
- "It's a Good Thing" (Demon Records - April 1986) UK No. 160
- "Natural Kind of Joy" (Demon Records - August 1986)
- "Big Decision" (Polydor Records - April 1987) UK No. 43
- "Swamp" (Polydor Records - July 1987) UK No. 64
- "Genius Move" (Virgin Records - October 1987) UK No. 65
- "Cellophane" (Virgin Records - September 1988) UK No. 98
- "Groove Check" (Virgin Records - 1989) UK No. 95
- "Abandon" (Virgin Records - March 1990) UK No. 73
- "Hey Venus" (Virgin Records - September 1990) UK No. 49 US Modern Rock No. 9
- "Tingle" (Virgin Records - February 1991) UK No. 49
- "Everybody's Goin' Triple Bad Acid Yeah!"/"Big Decision (Slight Return)" (Clawfist Records - March 1991) (split single with the Membranes)
- "Sensitize" (Virgin Records - April 1991) UK No. 55
- "Detonate My Dreams" (Koogat - 1993)
- Catch a Fire E.P. (Koogat - 1993)

=== Boxed sets ===
- Every Beginning Has a Future: An Anthology 1984-1994 (Edsel - 2022)
