= Chemicrazy =

Studio album by That Petrol Emotion
- Released: April 1990
- Genre: Alternative rock
- Length: 44:32
- Label: Virgin
- Producer: Scott Litt

That Petrol Emotion chronology
End of the Millennium Psychosis Blues (1988)	Chemicrazy (1990)	Fireproof (1993)

Singles from Chemicrazy
- 1. "Abandon" Released: March 1990; 2. "Hey Venus" Released: September 1990; 3. "Tingle" Released: February 1991; 4. "Sensitize" Released: April 1991

Chemicrazy is the fourth album by Irish alternative rockers That Petrol Emotion. The album was released in April 1990. It was produced by Scott Litt.

== Release and commercial performance ==
Four singles were taken from the album: "Abandon", "Hey Venus", "Sensitize" and "Tingle". Chemicrazy peaked at No. 62 on the UK Albums Chart. It was a hit on Billboard's College/Alternative Albums chart. The band supported the album with a North American tour.

== Critical reception ==
Professional ratings
Review scores
Source	Rating
AllMusic	3/5 stars
Los Angeles Times	3.5/5 stars
Orlando Sentinel	4/5 stars

The Los Angeles Times noted that, "after two albums of all groove and no song, the thrill is back at the incendiary level you'd expect from a band that descended from Northern Ireland's melodic punk boy wonders the Undertones." The Orlando Sentinel wrote that "Tingle" "is a breezy love song that lopes along and is pure pop at its best." The Houston Chronicle called the album "a strong, no-nonsense, uncompromising rock 'n' roll record from one of music's bright new bands."

== Track listing ==
Side one
No.	Title	Written by	Length
1.	"Hey Venus"	Ciaran McLaughlin	3:18
2.	"Blue to Black"	Ciaran McLaughlin	3:47
3.	"Mess of Words"	Ciaran McLaughlin	3:36
4.	"Sensitize"	Ciaran McLaughlin	4:05
5.	"Another Day"	Damian O'Neill	3:51
6.	"Gnaw Mark"	Damian O'Neill	4:13

Side two
No.	Title	Written by	Length
1.	"Scum Surfin'"	Ciaran McLaughlin	4:31
2.	"Compulsion"	Damian O'Neill	2:22
3.	"Tingle"	Raymond O'Gorman	3:30
4.	"Head Staggered"	Ciaran McLaughlin	4:01
5.	"Abandon"	Raymond O'Gorman	4:00
6.	"Sweet Shiver Burn"	Raymond O'Gorman, Ciaran McLaughlin	3:25

== Personnel ==
That Petrol Emotion

- Steve Mack – vocals, booklet design, arranger
- Raymond O'Gorman – guitar
- Damian O'Neill – guitar
- John Marchini – bass
- Ciaran McLaughlin – drums

with:

- Scott Litt – producer, engineer
- David Russo – programming, production assistant, piano on "Tingle", background vocals on "Sensitize"
- Hahn Rowe – violin on "Abandon", "Head Staggered" and "Sweet Shiver Burn"
- Joan Jones – trumpet on "Tingle"
- Steve Deutsch – bass on "Sweet Shiver Burn" and Help
- Clif Norrell – engineer
- Stephen Marcussen – mastering
- Gary Panter – cover painting
- Charles Peterson – photography
