= Kean (name) =

Kean is both a surname and a given name. Notable people with the name include:

== Surname ==
- Abram Kean (1855–1945), Newfoundland sealer and politician
- Andrew Kean (born 1978), Scottish football player
- Archie Kean (1894 – after 1925), Scottish footballer
- Arthur D. Kean (1882–1961), Canadian filmmaker
- Ben Kean (c. 1912–1993), American physician, author and researcher
- Betty Kean (1914–1986), American actress, sister of Jane Kean
- Bridie Kean (born 1987), Australian wheelchair basketball player and canoeist.
- Charles Kean (1811–1868), actor, son of Edmund Kean
- Edmund Kean (1789–1833), English actor
- Edward Kean (1924–2010), American television writer
- Ellen Kean (1805–1880), English actress
- Gareth Kean (born 1991), New Zealand swimmer
- Gerald Kean (born 1957), Irish celebrity solicitor
- Giovanni Kean (born 1993), Italian football player
- Hamilton Fish Kean (1862–1941), United States Senator from New Jersey
- Henry Kean (1894–1955), American football and basketball coach
- Jake Kean (born 1991), English football player
- Jane Kean (1923–2013), American actress and singer, sister of Betty Kean
- Jefferson Randolph Kean (1860–1950), American military surgeon
- John Kean (New Jersey politician) (1852–1914), United States Senator, United States Representative from New Jersey
- John Kean (South Carolina politician) (1756–1795), delegate to the Continental Congress from South Carolina
- Josh Kean (born 1993), Australian motor-racing driver
- Laurel Kean (born 1963), American golfer
- Mallory Kean (fl. 2000s), Canadian curler
- Mark Kean (born 1988), Canadian curler
- Marie Kean (1918–1993), Irish actress
- Michael Kean (died 1823), Irish artist, owner of Derby porcelain factory
- Moise Kean (born 2000), Italian football player
- Paul Kean, New Zealand musician
- Robert Kean (1893–1980), United States Representative from New Jersey
- Robert Garlick Hill Kean (1828–1898), Confederate States Army officer
- Roger Kean (died 2023), British magazine publisher
- Sam Kean, 21st-century American writer
- Sammy Kean (c. 1910–2003), Scottish football player and manager
- Simon Kean (born 1989), Canadian professional boxer
- Sherry Kean (fl. 1980s), Canadian pop and country singer
- Steve Kean (born 1967), Scottish football player and manager
- Stewart Kean (born 1983), Scottish football player
- Thomas Kean (born 1935), American politician; former Governor of New Jersey; chairman of the 9/11 Commission
- Thomas Kean Jr. (born 1968), American politician; New Jersey State Senator; United States Senate nominee; United States Representative
- William Kean (1871–1954), British trade unionist
- William B. Kean (1897–1981), general in the United States Army

== Given name ==
- Kean Baclaan (born 2003), Filipino professional basketball player
- Kean Bryan (born 1996), English football player
- Kean Cipriano (born 1987), Filipino singer, composer, actor, and musician
- Kean Soo, Canadian engineer, creator of the children's comic character Jellaby
- Kean Wong, American professional baseball player

Fictional characters:

- Kean Atreides, character in the universe of the Dune novels

== See also ==
- Keane
