= Kane (surname) =

- Pronunciation: /ˈkeɪn/
- Language: English

Origin
- Languages: 1. Old English; 2. Welsh; 3. Manx; 4. Irish; 5. Old French; 6. Transalpine Gaulish (likely)
- Origin: 1. Cana; 2. cain 3. Mac Cathain; 4. Ó Catháin; 5. cane 6. Caen
- Meaning: 1. male given name 2. 'beautiful' 3. 'son of Cathan'; 4. 'descendant of Cahan'; 5. 'reed' 6. placename in Normandy
- Region of origin: England, Scotland, Ireland

Other names
- Variant form: Cane

Kane is an English-language surname. It has multiple origins. It is derived from the old English name (k)cana. In Ireland, however, the name is of different origins as an anglicisation of Mac Catháin, and in Scotland is a sept of Clan MacMillan.

== Artists ==
- Adelaide Kane (born 1990), Australian actress
- Amory Kane, U.S. composer and musician
- Art Kane (1925–1995), American fashion and music photographer
- Arthur Kane (1949–2004), U.S. bassist of the New York Dolls
- Barbara Sanchez-Kane, Mexican fashion designer
- Ben Kane, English novelist, specialising in historical fiction
- Ben Kane (record producer), U.S. record producer
- Big Daddy Kane, U.S. rapper
- Bob Kane, most famous as the co-creator of Batman
- Candye Kane (born 1961), U.S. blues and jazz singer and songwriter
- Carol Kane, U.S. actress
- Chelsea Kane, U.S. actress and singer, originally known as Chelsea Staub
- Chez Kane, Welsh singer
- Chris Kane, Australian guitarist and songwriter of Eye of the Enemy
- Christian Kane, U.S. actor and country musician
- Christopher Kane, Scottish fashion designer
- Clinton Kane (born 1999), Filipino-Australian singer, songwriter, and musician
- David Kane (pianist), U.S.-Scottish composer and jazz pianist
- Eden Kane (born 1940), British singer
- Gil Kane, comic book artist
- Greg Kane (musician) (born 1966), Scottish musician, and co-member of Hue and Cry
- Cheikh Hamidou Kane, Senegalese writer
- Harry Kane (illustrator) (1912–1988), U.S. illustrator and artist
- Helen Kane (1904–1966), U.S. actress and singer
- Henry B. Kane (1902–1971), U.S. illustrator, photographer, and author of nature books for children
- Herb Kawainui Kāne (1928–2011), Native Hawaiian artist, historian, and author
- Jack Kane (composer) (1924–1961), English-born Canadian musician and composer
- John Kane (artist), Scottish painter
- Joseph Kane, U.S. film director and producer
- Justin Kane, U.S. actor
- Kevin Kane (musician), Canadian songwriter
- Kimberly Kane (born 1983), award-winning U.S. pornographic actress, author, and founding member and treasurer of APAC (Adult Performers Advocacy Committee)
- Mandy Kane, Australian rock musician
- Marjorie Kane (1909–1992), stage name "Babe Kane," prolific early U.S. film and stage actress
- Miles Kane (born 1986), British singer
- Paul Kane, a pseudonym used by American singer-songwriter Paul Simon
- Phil Kane, Scottish keyboard player of The Silencers
- Samuel Kane (born 1968), British actor
- Sarah Kane, English playwright
- Thommy Kane (born Thomas Joseph Abate III, 1978), stage name "Poverty," U.S. actor, filmmaker, songwriter, and composer
- Tom Kane (1962–2026), American voice actor

== Sportspeople ==
- Adja Kane (born 2005), French basketball player
- Ben Kane (footballer), Australian Australian rules footballer
- Boyd Kane, hockey player for the AHL's Hershey Bears
- Conor Kane (footballer), Irish footballer
- DeAndre Kane, American basketball player in the Israeli Basketball Super League and EuroLeague
- Evander Kane, hockey player for the NHL's Vancouver Canucks
- George Francis Kane (born 1948), American chess master
- Harry Kane (born 1993), English footballer
- Harry Kane (baseball) (1883–1932), American baseball player
- Harry Kane (hurdler) (born 1933), British hurdler
- Herbie Kane (born 1998), English footballer
- Jack Kane (ice hockey) (1936–2025), Canadian ice hockey player
- Jim Kane (disambiguation), multiple people
- Justin Kane, Australian boxer
- Patrick Kane, hockey player for the NHL's Detroit Red Wings
- Rick Kane (1954–2009), NFL running back played for the Detroit Lions and Washington Redskins
- Sanoussi Kane (born 2001), American football player
- Stanley Kane, English footballer
- Todd Kane, English footballer
- Tony Kane, Irish footballer

== Politicians and military people ==
- Elisha Kent Kane, medical officer in the United States Navy during the first half of the 19th century, member of two arctic expeditions
- Elizabeth Kane (1836–1909), American physician, writer, philanthropist, and women's rights activist.
- Frank E. Kane (born 1932), Canadian politician
- James Kane (1895–1964), Australian politician
- Kathleen Kane (born 1966), Pennsylvania lawyer and former attorney general convicted of felony perjury
- Michael N. Kane (1851–1924), American lawyer, judge, and politician
- Richard Rutledge Kane, Resident Commissioner of the Solomon Islands Protectorate
- Thomas L. Kane (1822–1883), American Civil War general and founder of Kane, Pennsylvania.

== Scholars ==
- Charles L. Kane, American theoretical physicist
- Daniel Kane (linguist), Australian linguist, expert on Jurchen and Khitan languages
- Daniel Kane (mathematician) (born 1986), American mathematician
- Josephine Kane, British academic and historian of architecture
- Pandurang Vaman Kane (1880–1972), Sanskrit scholar and an awardee of the Bharat Ratna
- Ruth Kane, New Zealand professor of education
- Thomas R. Kane, American academic

== Science and medical ==
- Evan O'Neill Kane (1861–1932), surgeon who performed several self-operations
- Gordon L. Kane, scientific leader in theoretical and phenomenological particle physics
- Jasper H. Kane, (1903–2004), American biochemist
- Katherine Sophia Kane (1811–1886), Irish botanist
- Shanley Kane, American technology writer
- Suzanne Amador Kane, American scientist

== Other ==
- Agnes Kane Callum (1925–2015), American genealogist
- Carol Kane (businesswoman), co-founder and joint CEO of Debenhams Group
- Conor Kane (journalist), Irish journalist
- Lisy Kane, Australian video game producer
- Nichola Kane, Scottish broadcast journalist
- Kane (noble family), a Norwegian noble family
- Vincent Kane, British news reporter

== Fictional ==
- Adam Kane, protagonist in one of Dead Rising 3 expansion missions.
- Barry Kane from Saboteur
- Bette Kane, or Betty Kane, the DC Comics Pre-Crisis Bat-Girl
- Billy Kane, a character from the Fatal Fury series
- Carter and Sadie Kane, protagonists from the series The Kane Chronicles by Rick Riordan
- Charles Foster Kane, the titular character of the film Citizen Kane
- Erica Kane, fictional character from the American television soap opera All My Children
- Fergus K. Kane from Lady in the Lake
- Garrison Kane, comic book character from the Marvel Universe
- Gilbert Kane, a character in the film Alien
- Reverend Henry Kane, fictional character from the Poltergeist film trilogy
- John Kane, a character in So Weird
- John Michael Kane, one of the aliases of Jason Bourne in The Bourne Identity (novel)
- Kathy/Kate Kane, Batwoman
- Lucas Kane, protagonist of the video game Fahrenheit a.k.a. Indigo Prophecy
- Marcus Kane from The 100 (TV series)
- Marshall Kane from Community
- Matthew Kane, the protagonist of the computer game Quake 4
- Needles Kane, character in the video game series Twisted Metal originally developed by Singletrac
- Solomon Kane, fictional 16th century Puritan adventurer created by Robert E. Howard
- Will Kane from High Noon
