= Manic Pop Thrill =

Studio album by That Petrol Emotion
- Released: 1986
- Recorded: 22 May 1986
- Studio: Rockfield Studios, Monmouth, Wales. *Recorded live at the Electric Ballroom
- Genre: Garage rock; post-punk; neo-psychedelia
- Label: Demon
- Producer: Hugh Jones

That Petrol Emotion chronology
Manic Pop Thrill (1986)	Babble (1988)

Manic Pop Thrill is the debut studio album by Irish indie rock band That Petrol Emotion. It was released in 1986, through record label Demon.

Two singles were released from the album: "It's a Good Thing" and "Natural Kind of Joy".

== Release and reception ==
Manic Pop Thrill reached No. 84 in the UK Albums Chart.

Professional ratings
Review scores
Source	Rating
AllMusic	4/5 stars
Robert Christgau	A−

AllMusic retrospectively called Manic Pop Thrill "an inspired debut".

== Track listing ==
No.	Title	Written by	Length
1.	"Fleshprint"	John O'Neill, Raymond O'Gorman	2:27
2.	"Can't Stop"	John O'Neill, Raymond O'Gorman	2:52
3.	"Lifeblood"	Raymond O'Gorman	3:51
4.	"Natural Kind of Joy"	John O'Neill	2:45
5.	"It's a Good Thing"	John O'Neill	2:34
6.	"Circusville"	John O'Neill	4:06
7.	"Mouth Crazy"	John O'Neill	3:07
8.	"Tightlipped"	Ciaran McLaughlin	3:06
9.	"A Million Miles Away"	John O'Neill	2:21
10.	"Lettuce"	John O'Neill	2:26
11.	"Cheapskate"	John O'Neill	3:44
12.	"Blindspot"	John O'Neill	4:19

1997 CD reissue bonus tracks also available on downloads
No.	Title	Written by	Length
13.	"V2" (Non-album single)	John O'Neill	3:52
14.	"Jesus Says" (B-side)	Damian O'Neill	2:28
15.	"The Deadbeat" (B-side)	Ciaran McLaughlin, Damian O'Neill	2:52
16.	"Mine" (B-side)	Steve Mack, Damian O'Neill	3:40
17.	"Non-Alignment Pact" (B-side)	Pere Ubu	2:56

13–15 were also bonus tracks on the original 1986 Demon CD release. One edition of the Demon LP included the "It's a Good Thing" 12" single (c/w "The Deadbeat" and "Mine") as a bonus record, complete with picture sleeve.

== Personnel ==
That Petrol Emotion

- Steve Mack – vocals
- John O'Neill – guitar
- Raymond O'Gorman – guitar, vocals, keyboards
- Damian O'Neill – bass, vocals, keyboards
- Ciaran McLaughlin – drums, percussion
