= Stump Pond (Pembroke, Massachusetts) =

- Location within Massachusetts Location within the United States
- Location: Pembroke, Massachusetts
- Coordinates: 42°04′55″N 70°46′23″W
- Type: reservoir
- Basin countries: United States
- Surface area: 100 acres (40 ha)
- Surface elevation: 23 ft (7 m)
- Settlements: East Pembroke

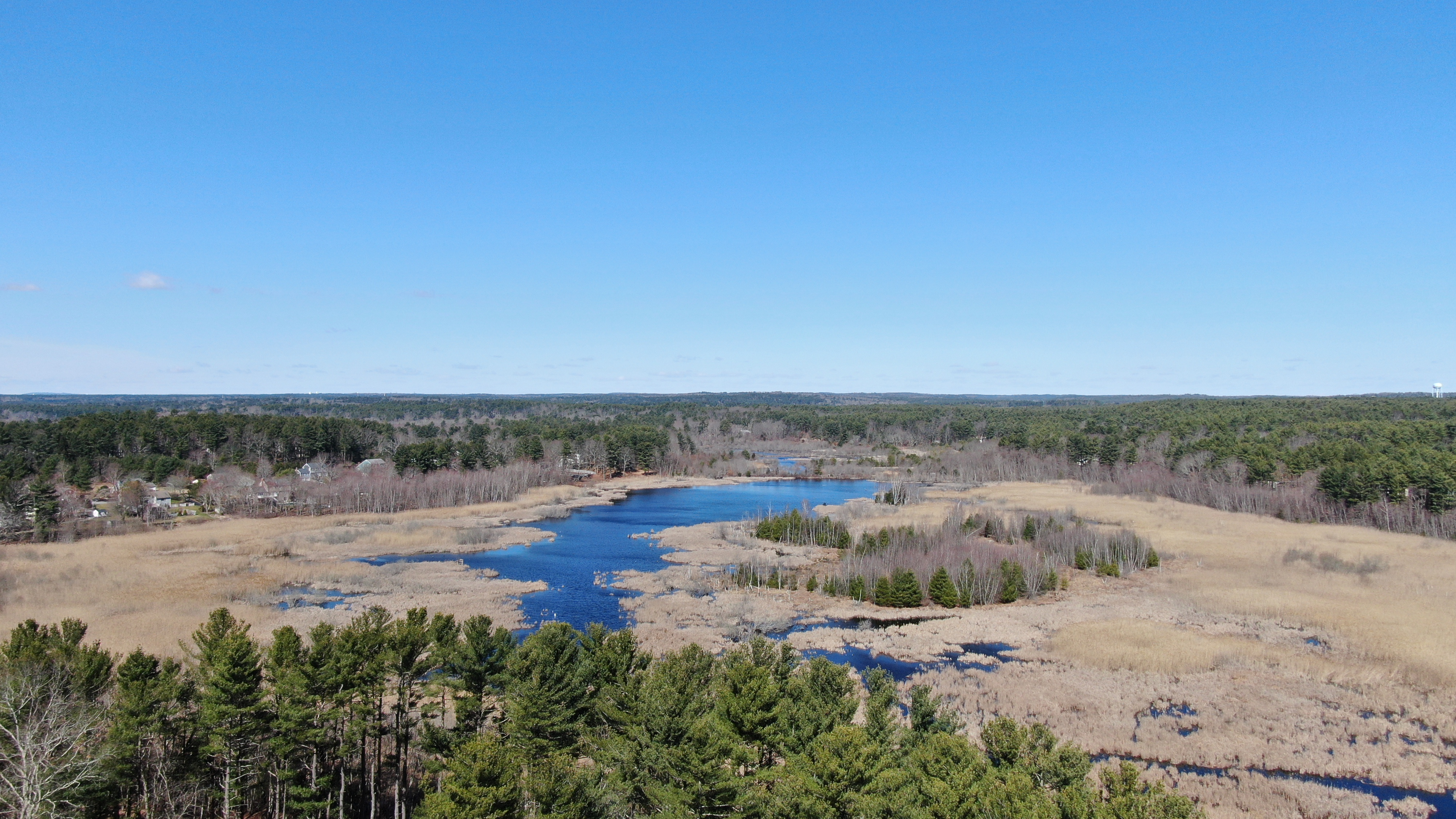
Stump Pond as it was in March 2020.

Stump Pond, was a 113-acre (0.46 km^{2}) reservoir in Pembroke, Massachusetts in the East Pembroke section of the town, east of the northern end of the Routes 14 and 53, west of Keene Pond and southwest of Arnold School Pond.
