= Big Decision =

Single by That Petrol Emotion

from the album Babble
- B-side: "Soul Deep"
- Released: April 1987
- Recorded: Jam Studios; Livingston Studios
- Genre: Indie rock
- Label: Polydor
- Songwriter: John O'Neill
- Producer: Roli Mosimann

That Petrol Emotion singles chronology
| "Natural Kind Of Joy" (1986) | "Big Decision" (1987) | "Swamp" (1987) |

"Big Decision" is a 1987 single by That Petrol Emotion. The song reached no. 43 on the UK charts, and no. 27 on the US Dance Club charts.

The song ranked number 3 among "Tracks of the Year" for 1987 in the annual NME critics' poll.

== Track listing ==
=== 7" ===
Side A
| No. | Title | Written by | Length |
|---|---|---|---|
| 1. | "Big Decision" | John O'Neill |

Side B
| No. | Title | Written by | Length |
|---|---|---|---|
| 1. | "Soul Deep" | John O'Neill |

=== 12" ===
Side A
| No. | Title | Written by | Length |
|---|---|---|---|
| 1. | "Big Decision (extended)" | John O'Neill |

Side B
| No. | Title | Written by | Length |
|---|---|---|---|
| 1. | "Soul Deep" | John O'Neill |
| 2. | "Big Decision (7" Version)" | John O'Neill |

=== 10" (Limited Edition) ===
"Big Decision", 10" cover

Side A
| No. | Title | Written by | Length |
|---|---|---|---|
| 1. | "Big Decision (extended)" | John O'Neill |

Side B
| No. | Title | Written by | Length |
|---|---|---|---|
| 1. | "Split" | Ciaran McLaughlin |
| 2. | "Soul Deep" | John O'Neill |

== Charts ==
| Chart (1987) | Peak position |
|---|---|
| UK Singles (OCC) | 43 |
| US Hot Dance Club Play (Billboard) | 27 |

== Personnel ==
- Steve Mack - vocals
- John O'Neill - guitar
- Raymond O'Gorman - guitar
- Damian O`Neill - bass guitar
- Ciaran McLaughlin - drums
