= Chisholm Trail Academy =

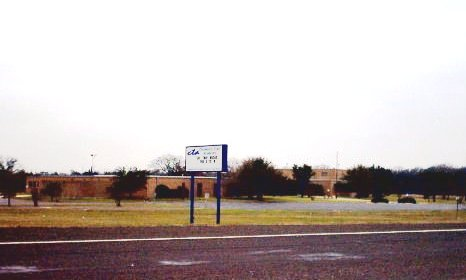

Location
- 401 South Old Betsy Road; Keene, Texas 76059; United States; 32.389543°N 97.332757°W

Information
- Type: Private
- Religious affiliation: Seventh-day Adventist Church
- Grades: 9 - 12 Academy
- Accreditation: Adventist Accrediting Association
- Website: cta.school

Chisholm Trail Academy (CTA) is a Seventh-day Adventist co-educational high school located at Fourth and Old Betsy in Keene, Texas. Keene is located midway between Alvarado and Cleburne, 25 miles (40 km) south of Fort Worth. Chisholm Trail Academy is situated on 27 acres (110,000 m^{2}) of land.

== History ==
Chisholm Trail Academy came into existence when Southwestern Junior College (now Southwestern Adventist University) was granted full college status and closed its academy operation in 1967. Chisholm Trail Academy's first graduating class was in 1968.

== See also ==
- List of Seventh-day Adventist secondary schools
- Seventh-day Adventist education
