= Cumee na Gall O'Cahan =

Cumee na Gall O'Cahan (Irish: Cú Maighe na nGall Ó Catháin) was a chief of the O'Cahan of Keenaght, Fir-na-Creeve and Fir Lee in modern-day County Londonderry, Northern Ireland. The family first appears on record in 1138. Cumee was a son of Manus O'Cahan, a man who fell in battle alongside fourteen other members of the O'Cahan in support of Brian O'Neill, king of Tír Eoghain, at the battle of Druim Dearg.

Following his father's death, Cumee was made chief of his kindred by Henry de Mandeville, seneschal of Ulster, and thereupon served as an ally to this Anglo-Irish lord. His ties with the Normans earned him the epithet of na nGall meaning "of the foreigners".

Cumee's son, Dermot, appears on record in 1312. Cumee's daughter, Anna (Áine), married Angus Og MacDonald.

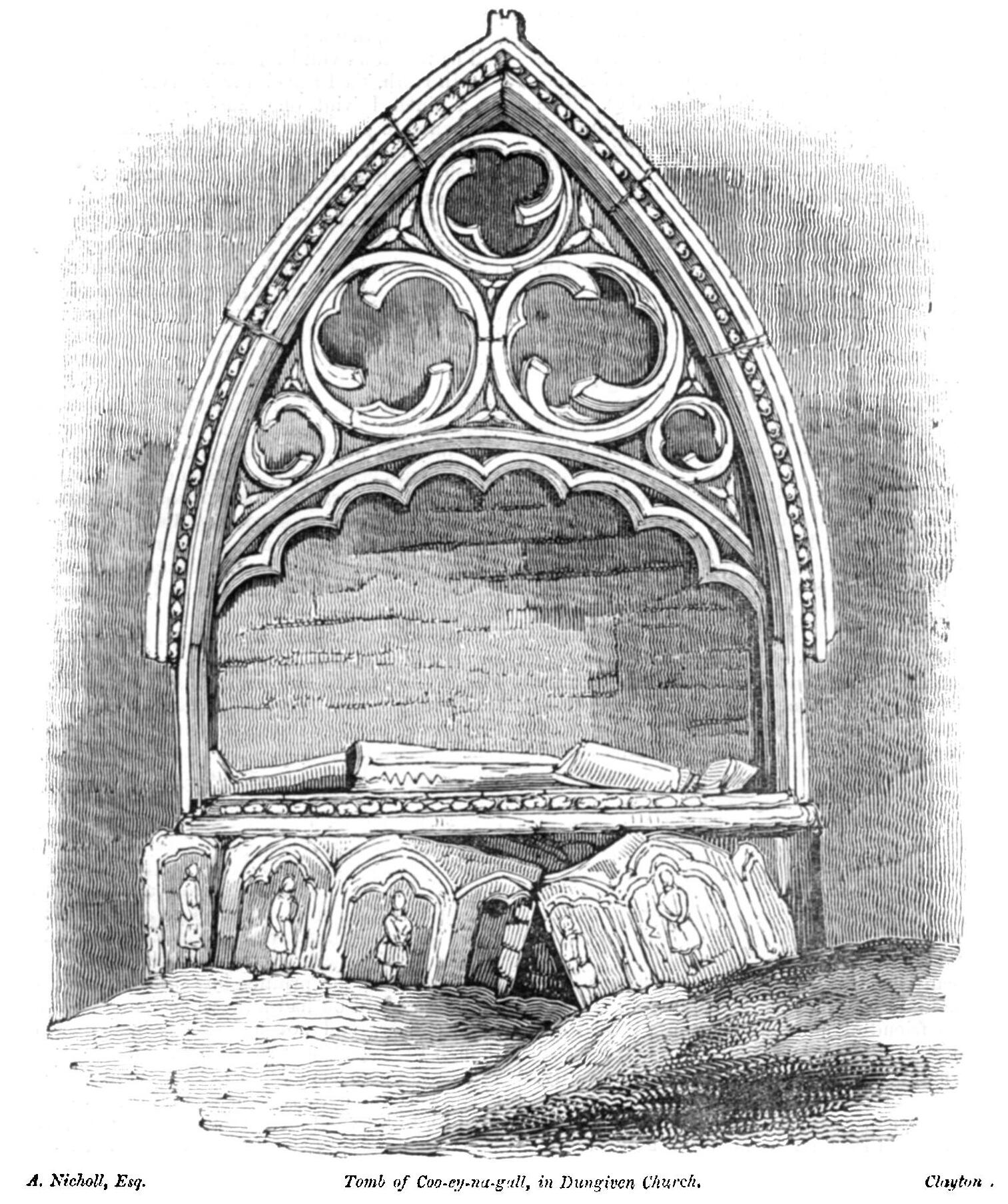
The disputed tomb in Dungiven, Dublin Penny Journal, 1833

A heavily restored effigy at Dungiven Priory is sometimes associated with Cumee, although it appears to date to the last quarter of the fifteenth century, and seems to be that of a later member of the kindred: perhaps either Godfrey (Gofraidh, died 1472), Dermot (Diarmait, died 1484), Godfrey (Gofraidh, died 1492), or Owen (Eóin, died 1492).
