= Fokker V.2 =

1917 prototype fighter aircraft

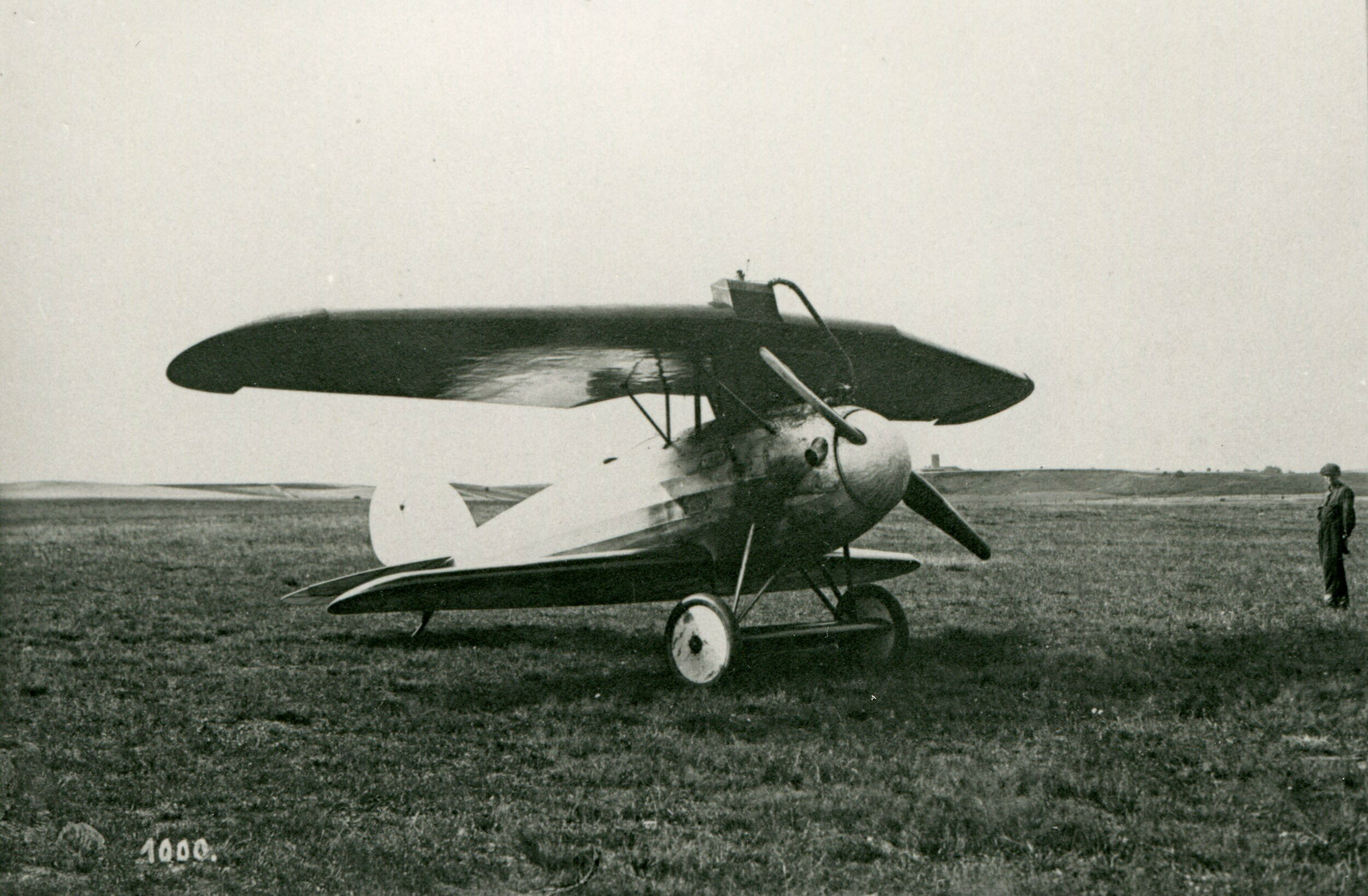
- Fokker V.3

General information
- Type: Fighter
- Manufacturer: Fokker-Flugzeugwerke
- Designer: Reinhold Platz

History
- First flight: 1917

The Fokker V.2 and V.3 prototype sesquiplane fighters were developed from the Fokker V.1, but utilized liquid-cooled straight-six engines. Only one example of each was constructed in 1917 as they were too heavy to offer any significant advantage over the Albatros D.III fighters already in service.

== Development ==
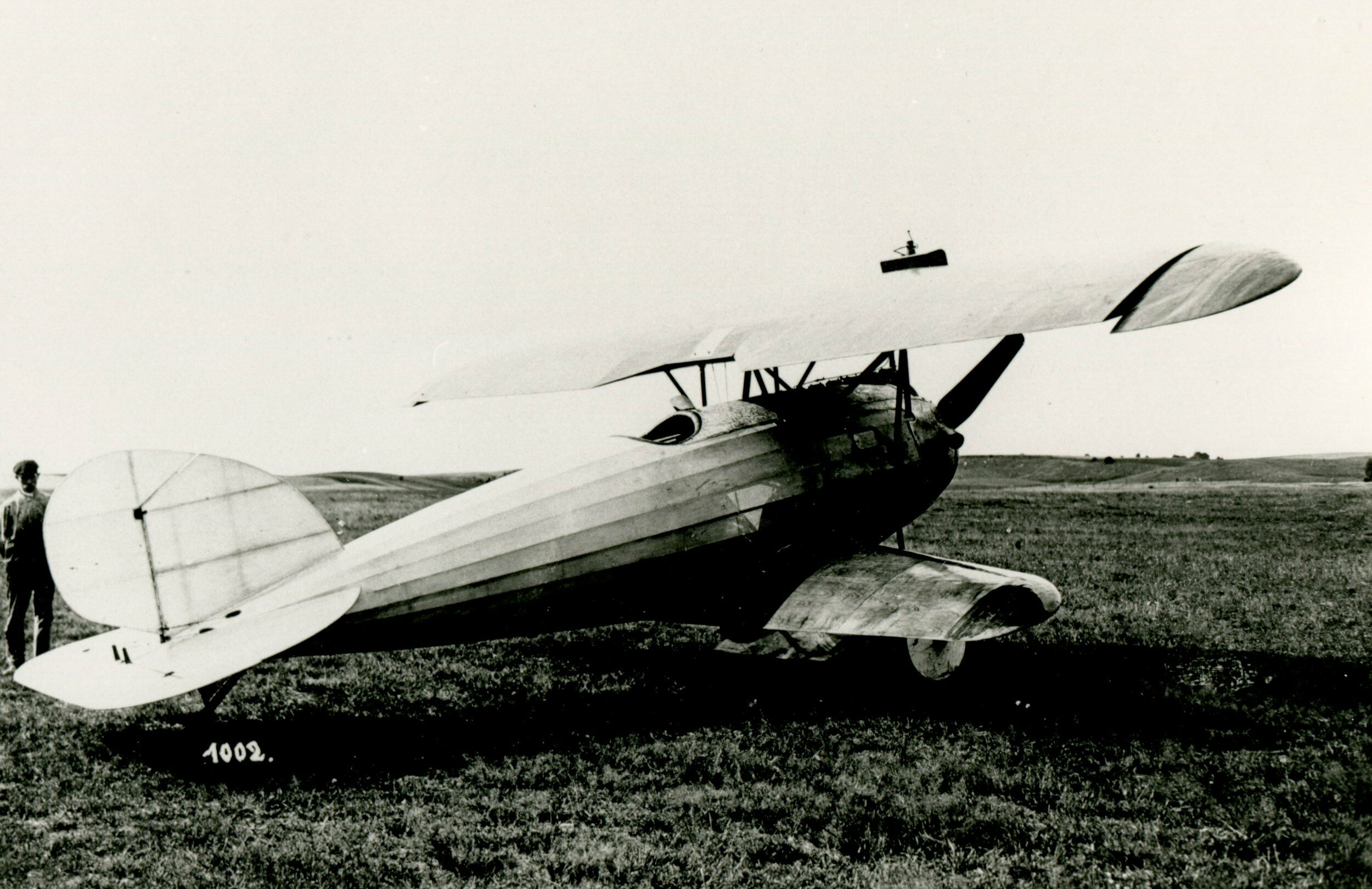
Aft view of the Fokker V.3

Like the V.1, the fuselages of both aircraft were circular in cross section, impeding the pilot's view downwards, and the cantilever wings were built from plywood. The outer portion of the staggered upper wing was slightly swept backwards. The V.2's 160-horsepower (120 kW) Mercedes D.III piston engine and its radiator were fully cowled and the propeller was given a spinner to reduce drag. It retained the V.1's rotating upper portion of the vertical stabilizer that acted as a rudder and fully-moving horizontal stabilizers. The V.2 was 10 kilometers per hour (6.2 mph) faster than the V.1, but its rate of climb was slower.

The V.3 differed from the V.2 in that the engine was only partially enclosed by the cowling and the radiator was mounted above the upper wing, probably to improve reliability and make maintenance easier. In addition the tail structure was replaced by one that resembled that of the Albatros D.III. It was designed to accept a pair of fixed, forward-firing machine guns, but these were not actually mounted during flight testing. The V.3 was 10 kilometers per hour faster than the V.2, but its rate of climb was worse.

== Specifications (Fokker V.2) ==
Data from Fokker Aircraft of WWI: Volume 4: V.1–V.8, F.I & Dr.I: A Centennial Perspective on Great War Airplanes

General characteristics

- Crew: 1
- Length: 6.6 m (21 ft 8 in)
- Upper wingspan: 9.3 m (30 ft 6 in)
- Height: 2.94 m (9 ft 8 in)
- Wing area: 22 m^{2} (240 sq ft)
- Empty weight: 663 kg (1,462 lb)
- Gross weight: 921 kg (2,030 lb)
- Fuel capacity: 85 litres (19 imp gal; 22 US gal)
- Powerplant: 1 × Mercedes D.III water-cooled straight-six piston engine, 120 kW (160 hp)
- Propellers: 2-bladed

Performance

- Maximum speed: 190 km/h (120 mph, 100 kn)
- Time to altitude: 3 minutes to 1,000 m (3,300 ft)
- 9 minutes to 2,000 m (6,600 ft)
- 16 minutes to 3,000 m (9,800 ft)
- Power/mass: 4.14 kg/hp

== Bibliography ==
- Herris, Jack & Phillips, Taz (2021). Fokker Aircraft of WWI: Volume 4: V.1–V.8, F.I & Dr.I: A Centennial Perspective on Great War Airplanes. Great War Aviation Centennial Series. Vol. 54. n.p.: Aeronaut Books. ISBN 978-1-953201-08-9.
- Leaman, Paul (2001). Fokker Aircraft of World War One. Marlborough, UK: Crowood Press. ISBN 1-86126-353-8.
