= Keene Township =

Keene Township may refer to:

- Keene Township, Adams County, Illinois
- Keene Township, Michigan
- Keene Township, Clay County, Minnesota
- Keene Township, McKenzie County, North Dakota, in McKenzie County, North Dakota
- Keene Township, Coshocton County, Ohio
