= Southwestern Adventist University =

Private Adventist university in Keene, Texas

Coordinates: 32°23′49.44″N 97°19′38.52″W

- Type: Private college
- Established: 1893
- Religious affiliation: Seventh-day Adventist Church
- President: Nelu Nedelea
- Location: Keene, Texas, United States
- Campus: Rural
- Nickname: Knights
- Sporting affiliations: NCCAA
- Website: www.swau.edu

Southwestern Adventist University is a private Adventist college in Keene, Texas. It is owned by the Southwestern Union Conference of Seventh-day Adventists and enrolls about 800 students on a rural, 150-acre campus. The institution is accredited by the Southern Association of Colleges and Schools. and the Adventist Accrediting Association.

== History ==
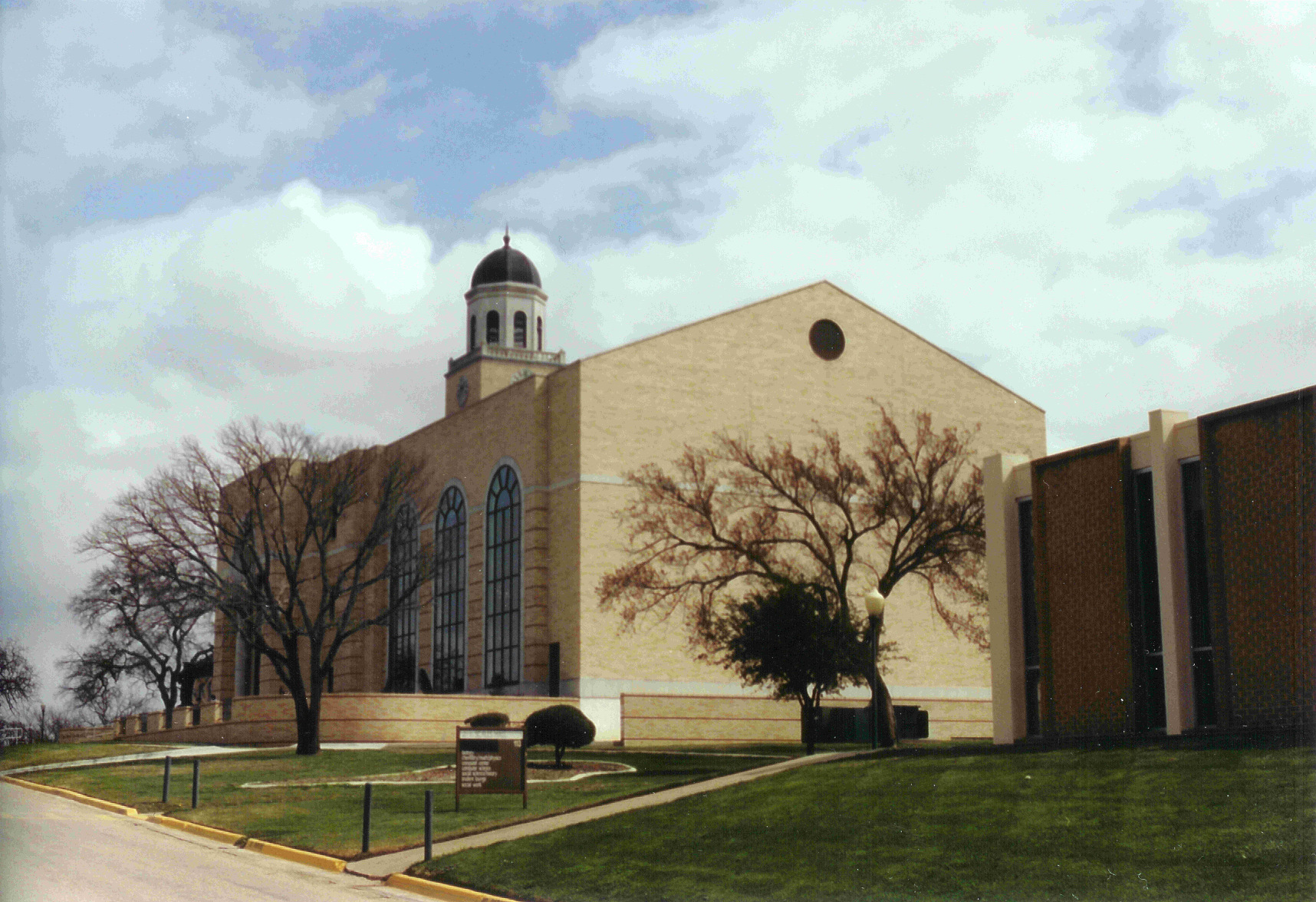
Southwestern Adventist University Library

Southwestern Adventist University was founded in 1893 as Keene Industrial Academy. The purchase of property for the school was financed by Seventh-day Adventists in the Dallas area. Its first building, completed in 1894, was also used as a church. The school, which opened with 56 students, adopted its current name in 1996.

On January 2, 1944, the West Hall boys' dormitory, which had undergone extensive repairs in the summer of 1943, was destroyed by fire. Reginald Maddison, a 16-year-old student, was awakened by a rumbling sound around 5:00 a.m. and saw flames emerging from a dust closet. He alerted students to the fire and activated the fire alarm. Twelve students, including Maddison, escaped unharmed. One student was injured when jumping from a second story window and two students died.

Southwestern Adventist University is located at the town of Keene, Texas, six miles northeast of Cleburne.

The Keene Seventh-day Adventist Church has several thousand members. It is the Southwestern Adventist University church.

The Seventh-day Adventist Church in America is divided into administrative units called unions and most of these unions have a college. Most of these colleges were founded in the 1890s, a period of intense activity in Adventist history.

The institution evolved through several stages from Keene Industrial Academy to its present status. At its beginning, it sold acreage to Adventist families and industries, and is now the largest Adventist community in the Southwestern Union, which includes Texas, Arkansas, Oklahoma, Louisiana, and New Mexico.

== Academics ==
During fall 2014, Southwestern began to offer a Fire Science degree. The program is the only one of its kind among Seventh-day Adventist colleges and universities. Graduates of this program receive a degree as well as several technical certifications that allow them to become employed by fire departments.

In June 2023, the institution was placed on "warning" status by its institutional accreditor, the Southern Association of Colleges and Schools, after the accreditor's board found significant non-compliance with its standards of student achievement, student outcomes and employment of full-time faculty. The status was lifted in July 2025. In addition to its institutional accreditation, its nursing program is approved by the Texas Board of Nurse Examiners.

== Athletics ==
The Southwestern Adventist (SWAU) athletic teams are the Knights. The institution is a member of the United States Collegiate Athletic Association (USCAA) since the 2002–03 academic year. They are also a member of the National Christian College Athletic Association (NCCAA), primarily competing as an independent in the Southwest Region of the Division II level. The Knights previously competed in the Red River Athletic Conference (RRAC) of the National Association of Intercollegiate Athletics (NAIA) from 1998–99 to 2001–02.

SWAU competes in eight intercollegiate varsity sports. Men's sports include basketball and soccer while women's sports include basketball, soccer, and volleyball. Co-ed sports include cross country, gymnastics, and tennis.

== See also ==
- KJRN
- List of Seventh-day Adventist colleges and universities
- Seventh-day Adventist education
