= Mark Keane =

Mark Keane may refer to:

- Mark Keane (cognitive scientist), Irish cognitive scientist and author
- Mark Keane (footballer), Irish player of Australian rules football
- Mark Keane (hurler), Irish hurler
