= O'Kane Market and O'Kane Building =

Historic commercial building in New York, United States

- U.S. National Register of Historic Places
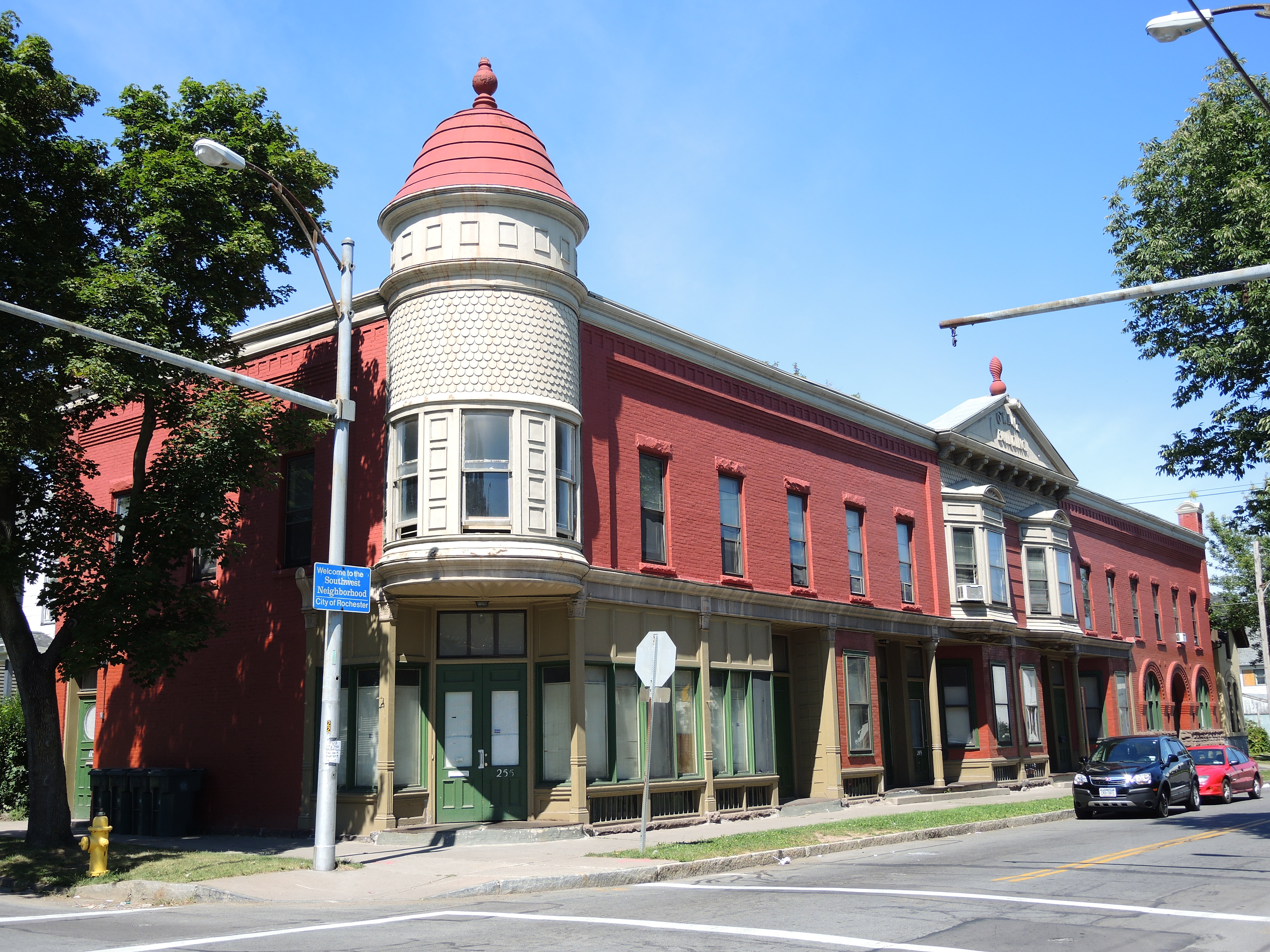

- Location within New York Location within the United States
- Location: 104-106 Bartlett St. (O'Kane Market) & 239-255 Reynolds St. (O'Kane Building), Rochester, New York
- Coordinates: 43°8′34″N 77°37′36″W
- Area: less than one acre
- Built: 1878
- Architectural style: Gothic, Italianate, Queen Anne
- NRHP reference No.: 85002288
- Added to NRHP: September 12, 1985

O'Kane Market and O'Kane Building are historic commercial buildings located at Rochester in Monroe County, New York. The O'Kane Market (1878) and O'Kane Building (1889–1890) are architecturally significant as intact, representative examples of late 19th century Italianate and Eclectic style commercial properties in Rochester's Eighth Ward.

It was listed on the National Register of Historic Places in 1985.

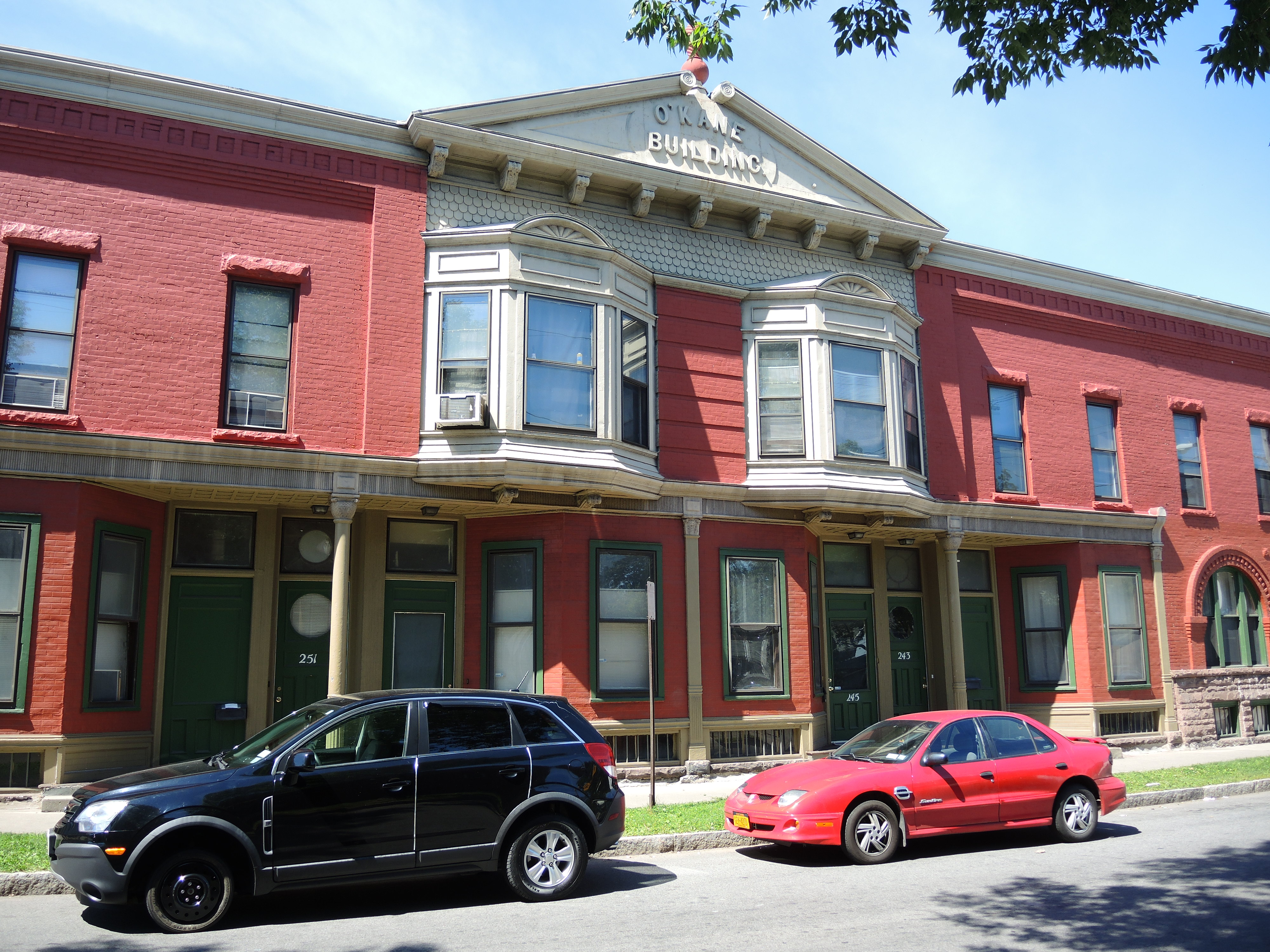
Building, east side

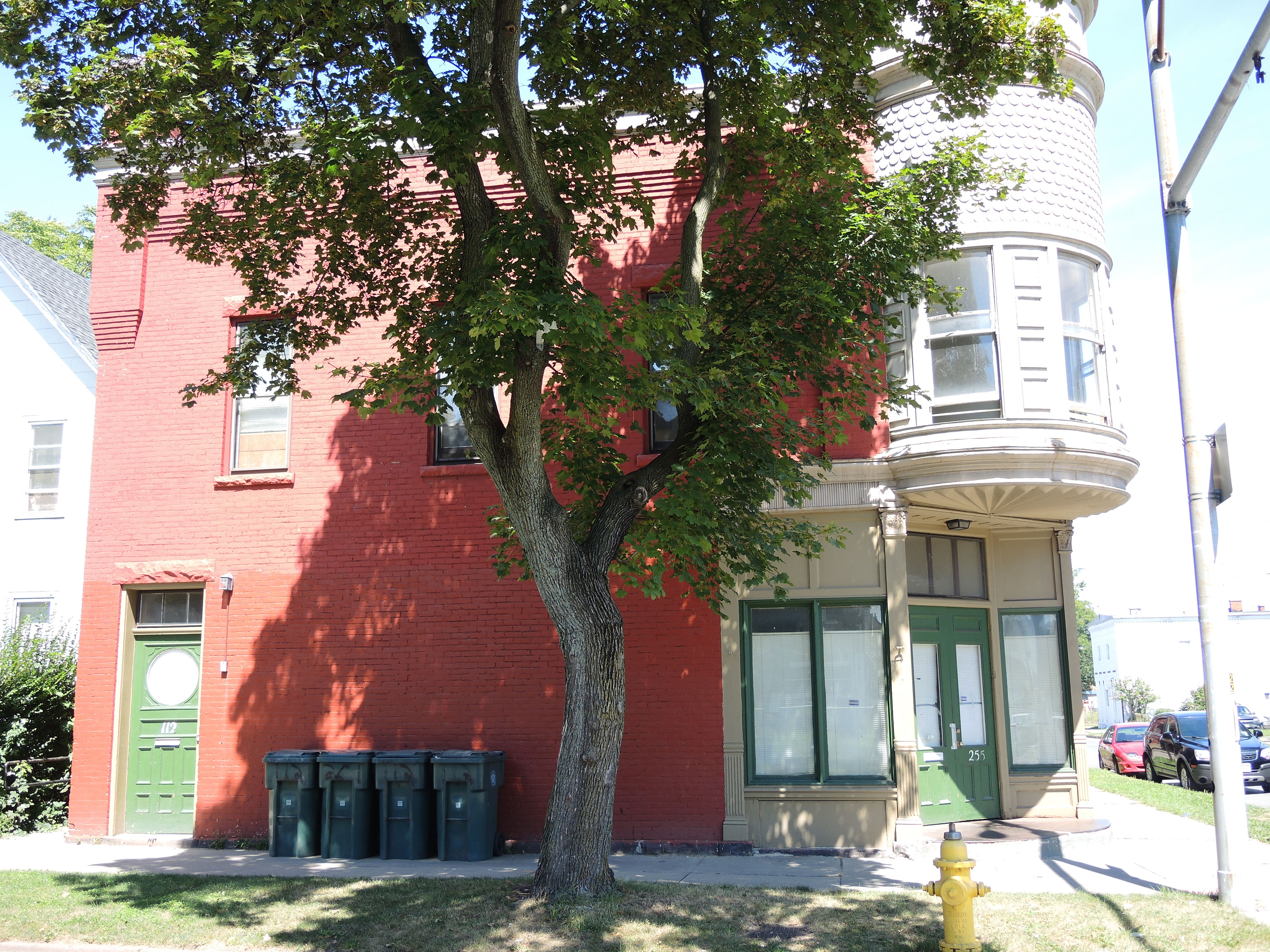
Building, south side

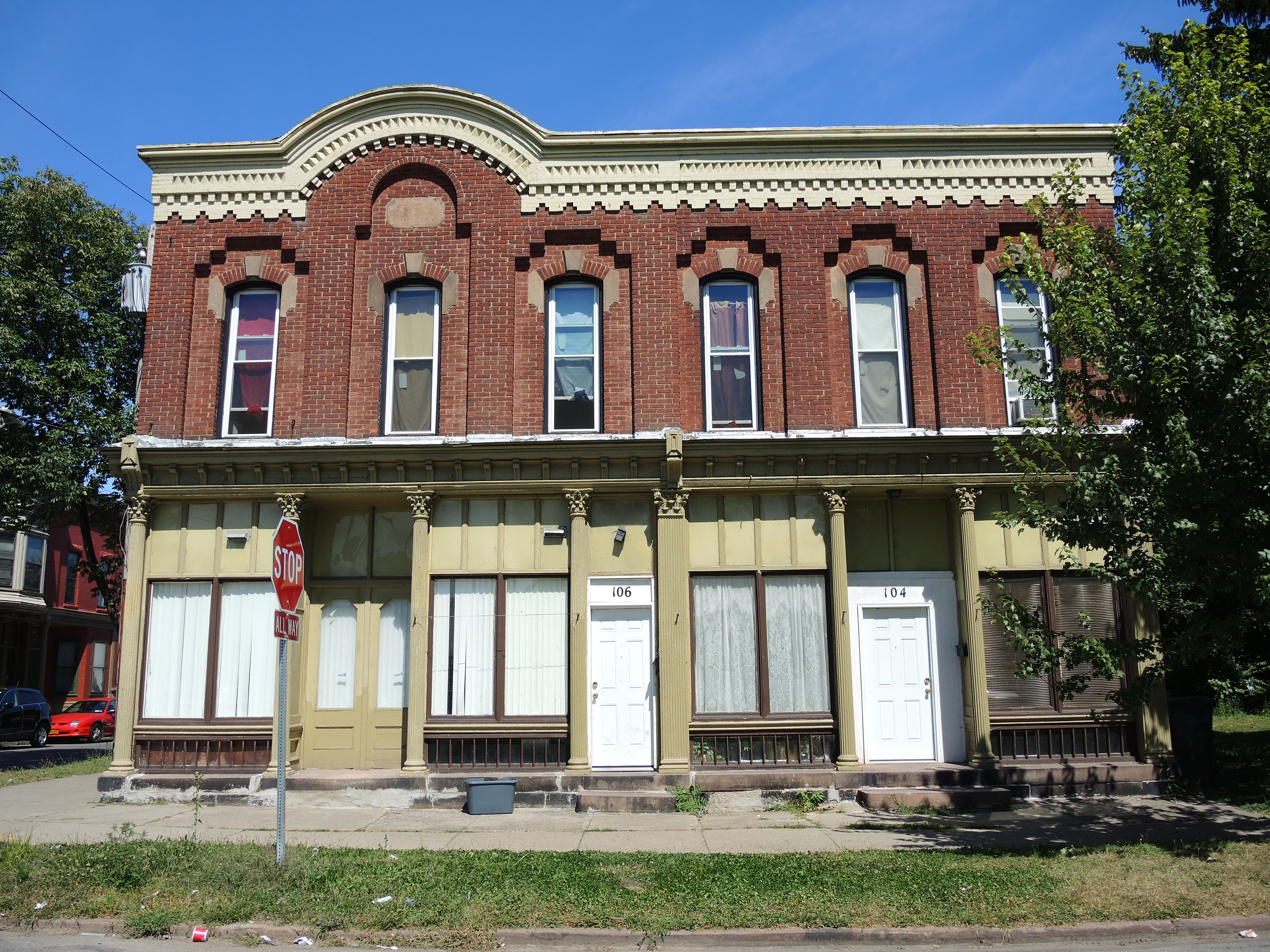
Market
