= Keene Pond =

Pond in Duxbury, Massachusetts, US

- Location within Massachusetts
- Location: Duxbury, Massachusetts
- Coordinates: 42°04′34″N 70°45′07″W
- Primary inflows: Keene Brook
- Primary outflows: Keene Brook
- Basin countries: United States
- Surface area: 13 acres (5.3 ha)
- Settlements: Ashdod

Keene Pond is a 13-acre (5.3 ha) pond in Duxbury, Massachusetts in the Ashdod section of the town. The pond is located east of Stump Pond. Keene Brook, a tributary of the South River, flows through the pond. Camp Wing, a summer camp for children age 7–16 run by Crossroads for Kids, Inc., is located on the eastern shore of the pond.
