= Paddy O'Kane =

Irish association footballer (1906–1968)

Personal information
- Full name: Patrick Joseph O'Kane
- Date of birth: 15 November 1906
- Place of birth: Dublin, Ireland
- Date of death: 2 February 1968 (aged 61)
- Place of death: Blanchardstown, Dublin, Ireland

International career
Years	Team	Apps	(Gls)
1934–1935	Republic of Ireland	3	(0)

Patrick Joseph O'Kane (15 November 1906 – 2 February 1968) was an Irish soccer player during the 1920s and 1930s.

O'Kane was a tough defender who played for Bohemians during his career in the League of Ireland. He was part of the Bohs team that won the FAI Cup in 1935, beating Dundalk 4–3 at Dalymount Park.

O'Kane captained Bohemians in the 1936 season following his brother Mick who was captain in 1931 to become the 2nd set of brothers to captain the club. The first were the Hooper brothers, Willie and Richard.

== International career ==
O'Kane won three full international caps for the Irish Free State while playing for Bohemian FC, making his debut against Hungary at Dalymount Park in December 1934.

== Death ==
Paddy O'Kane died in Blanchardstown on 2 February 1968, at the age of 61.

== Honours ==
- FAI Cup:
  - Bohemians - 1934/35
