= Nichola Kane =

Nichola Kane is a broadcast journalist and producer for STV News in Central Scotland.

Kane joined Scotland Today around 1998 after completing a degree in media studies and politics at Stirling University and a diploma in journalism at Strathclyde University. After working in STV's Glasgow newsroom for six months, Kane was seconded to the station's Edinburgh studios and has since covered the Eastern area for the programme.

She is currently the producer of the East edition of STV News at Six.
