= End of the Millennium Psychosis Blues =

Studio album by That Petrol Emotion
- Released: 12 September 1988
- Studio: Rockfield Studios; Ridge Farm Studio; Groove Check Recording
- Genre: Alternative rock
- Label: Virgin
- Producer: Roli Mosimann

That Petrol Emotion chronology
Babble (1987)	End of the Millennium Psychosis Blues (1988)	Chemicrazy (1990)

Singles from End of the Millennium Psychosis Blues
- 1. "Cellophane" Released: 23 October 1988; 2. "Groove Check" Released: 1989

Professional ratings
Review scores
Source	Rating
AllMusic	3/5 stars
Robert Christgau	B
Record Mirror	4/5 stars

End of the Millennium Psychosis Blues is the third studio album by Irish indie rock band That Petrol Emotion. It was released in 1988, and was the last album with guitarist John O'Neill. Two singles were released from the album: "Cellophane" and "Groove Check".

== Release ==
End of the Millennium Psychosis Blues reached No. 53 in the UK Albums Chart.

== Track listing ==
No.	Title	Written by	Length
1.	"Sooner or Later"	John O'Neill, Damian O'Neill, Steve Mack	4:25
2.	"Every Little Bit"	John O'Neill	3:25
3.	"Cellophane"	John O'Néill	3:00
4.	"Candy Love Satellite"	John O'Néill, Steve Mack	2:24
5.	"Here It Is... Take It!"	Ciaran McLaughlin	4:37
6.	"The Price of My Soul"	Ciaran McLaughlin	2:53
7.	"Groove Check"	Ciaran McLaughlin, Réamann O'Gorman, Steve Mack	4:49
8.	"The Bottom Line"	Réamann O'Gorman	4:15
9.	"Tension"	John O'Neill, Ciaran McLaughlin, Réamann O'Gorman	3:51
10.	"Tired Shattered Man"	Damian O'Neill, Réamann O'Gorman	4:00
11.	"Goggle Box"	Ciaran McLaughlin, Steve Mack	3:16
12.	"Under the Sky"	Ciaran McLaughlin, Réamann O'Gorman	4:36

== Personnel ==
That Petrol Emotion

- Steve Mack – vocals
- Seán O'Néill – guitar
- Réamann O'Gorman – guitar
- Damian O'Neill – bass, guitar on "Tired Shattered Man"
- Ciaran McLaughlin – drums, harmonica, guitar on "Groove Check"

Additional musicians

- Geraint Watkins – accordion
- Avelia Moisey – trumpet
- Ben Park – saxophone
- Geoff Blythe – saxophone
- Jim Paterson – trombone
- Elana Harris – backing vocals on "The Bottom Line"
- Michele Amar – backing vocals on "The Bottom Line"
