= Keene Independent School District =

School district in Texas

- 3625 US-67 # C Keene, Texas, 76059

District information
- Type: Public
- Motto: Lead the Charge
- Grades: Pre-K through 12
- Superintendent: Ricky Stevens
- School board: 7 members
- Accreditation(s): Texas Education Agency
- Schools: Elementary 1, Middle 1, High 1, Alternative learning 1
- NCES District ID: 4825230

Students and staff
- Students: 1,022
- Teachers: 82.3
- Student–teacher ratio: 12.42

Other information
- Website: https://www.keeneisd.org/

Keene Independent School District is a public school district based in Keene, Texas (USA).

In 2010, the school district was rated "Exemplary" by the Texas Education Agency.

== Schools ==
- Wanda R. Smith High School (Grades 9–12)
- Keene Junior High (Grades 6–8)
- Keene Elementary (Grades PK-3)
- Summit Leadership Academy (Grades 3–5)
- Keene Alternative Learning Center (Special Education)
- Keene Little Leaders Academy (Infant-Age 3)

== Administration ==
=== District ===
- Ricky Stephens, Superintendent of Schools
- Sandy Denning, Asst. Superintendent
- Elizabeth Menchaca, Chief Financial Officer
- Robert Hinerman, Technology Director
- Emily McElroy, Administrative Assistant
- Maribel Vazquez, District PEIMS Coordinator

=== Keene High School ===
Jarrett Morgan, Principal

=== Keene Junior High School ===
- Don Bell, Principal
- Shurtleff, Assistant Principal

=== Summit Leadership Academy ===
Julie McKintosh, Principal

=== Keene Elementary School ===
- Kelly Turnage, Principal
- Natasha Curubo, Dean of Students

=== Keene Alternative Learning Center ===
Ted O'Neil, Principal
