= Keen (song) =

1985 song performed by That Petrol Emotion

Single by That Petrol Emotion
- B-side: "A Great Depression On A Slum Night"
- Released: July 1985
- Recorded: 12 March & 19 March 1985; Alaska Studios, London
- Genre: Indie
- Label: The Pink Label
- Songwriter(s): John O'Neill
- Producer(s): That Petrol Emotion

That Petrol Emotion singles chronology
"Keen" (1985)	"V2" (1985)

"Keen"
- The cover for the 1986 12" version

Single by That Petrol Emotion
- B-side: "A Great Depression On A Slum Night"; "Zig-Zag Wanderer"
- Released: 1986
- Recorded: 12 March & 19 March 1985 Alaska Studios, London; 13 August 1986 Scarf Studios, London ("Zig-Zag Wanderer")
- Genre: Indie
- Label: The Pink Label
- Songwriter(s): John O'Neill
- Producer(s): That Petrol Emotion

"Keen" is a 1985 non-album single by That Petrol Emotion.
The 12" B-side "Zig-Zag Wanderer" was originally recorded by Captain Beefheart and his Magic Band in 1967.

== Track listing 7" ==
Side A
No.	Title	Written by	Length
1.	"Keen"	John O'Neill	3:10

Side B
No.	Title	Written by	Length
1.	"A Great Depression On A Slum Night"	John O'Neill	4:03

== Track listing 12" ==
Side A
No.	Title	Written by	Length
1.	"Keen"	John O'Neill	3:10

Side B
No.	Title	Written by	Length
1.	"A Great Depression On A Slum Night"	John O'Neill	4:03
2.	"Zig-Zag Wanderer"	Don Van Vliet/Herb Bermann	2:24

== Personnel ==
- Steve Mack - Vocals
- John O'Neill - Guitar
- Raymond Gorman - Guitar
- Damian O'Neill - Bass Guitar
- Ciaran McLaughlin - Drums
