= Stanley Kane =

English footballer

Personal information
- Date of birth: 17 April 1912
- Place of birth: Workington, England
- Height: 5 ft 11 in (1.80 m)
- Position: Goalkeeper

Senior career*
Years	Team	Apps	(Gls)
1934	Birmingham	0	(0)
1934–1936	Liverpool	6	(0)
1936	Southend United	2	(0)
- * Club domestic league appearances and goals

Stanley Kane (17 April 1912 – died 1976) was an English professional footballer who played as a goalkeeper. After starting his career with Birmingham, he made his professional debut in 1935 while playing for Liverpool. He later played for Southend United before retiring from football to become a police officer.

== Career ==
Born in Workington, Kane began his career with Birmingham but failed to break into the first-team. He instead joined Liverpool in September 1934. Signed as cover for established first choice Arthur Riley, he was forced to wait until March 1935 before making his debut for the club, playing in a Merseyside derby match against Everton on 20 March 1935. During the match, Liverpool defender Jack Tennant conceded a penalty after attempting to stop Dixie Dean from interfering with Kane during the match. Kane suffered an injury to his left hand after unsuccessfully attempting to save the resulting penalty but completed the match. He retained his place for a 3–2 victory over Huddersfield Town three days later but made one further appearance during the 1934–35 season in a 5–1 defeat to Tottenham Hotspur on 27 April 1935.

The following season, Kane again acted as cover for Riley and played in three league matches during the course of the season before joining Third Division North side Southend United in April 1936. He featured in two matches for Southend before securing a release from his contract with the club in order to join the Liverpool City Police force. He later played for the national police football team.

== Later life ==
Kane became a constable in the police force. In 1940, he successfully sued a former police officer for slander over accusations that Kane had lied about witnessing a car accident, being awarded £250 plus costs for damages. In 1943, he married Lilian Nichols, daughter of a chief superintendent in the Liverpool police force, at St. Mary's church in West Derby.

== Career statistics ==
Club	Season	League			FA Cup		League Cup		Other		Total	
Club	Season	Division	Apps	Goals	Apps	Goals	Apps	Goals	Apps	Goals	Apps	Goals
Liverpool	1934–35	First Division	3	0	0	0	0	0	0	0	3	0
Liverpool	1935–36	First Division	3	0	0	0	0	0	0	0	3	0
Liverpool	Liverpool total		6	0	0	0	0	0	0	0	6	0
Southend United	1935–36	Third Division North	2	0	0	0	0	0	0	0	2	0
Total			8	0	0	0	0	0	0	0	8	0
