= Peter Keane =

Peter Keane may refer to:

- Peter Keane (musician)
- Peter Keane (Gaelic footballer)
- Peter Keane (canoeist) (born 1955)
- Peter Keane, mayor of Galway
