= O'Cahan =

Irish clan

- Parent house: Northern Uí Néill
- Country: Ireland
- Founded: 11th century
- Founder: Cathán Ua Néill; Cú Maighe Ua Catháin (first recorded)
- Final ruler: Donnell Ballagh O'Cahan (died 1627)
- Titles: Prince of Limavady; Lord of Keenaght; Keane baronets; Baron Keane
- Cadet branches: McCloskey; Ó Maoláin; Munro

The O'Cahan (Irish: Uí Chatháin 'descendants of Cahan', pronounced [iː ˈxahaːnʲ]) were a powerful sept of the Northern Uí Néill's Cenél nEógain in medieval Ireland. The name is presently anglicized as O'Kane, Kane and Keane.

The O'Cahans originated in Laggan in the east of present-day County Donegal and from there moved eastwards in the twelfth century, ousting the O'Connor from Keenaght in present-day County Londonderry. They held the lordship of Keenaght and Coleraine until the seventeenth century, to which it was commonly referred to as "O'Cahan's country". Under the sub-ordination of their kin, the O'Neills, they held the privilege of inaugurating the chief of the O'Neill by tossing a shoe over the new chief's head in acceptance of his rule.

There is also an unrelated sept of O'Cahan in the province of Connacht, the O'Cahan Ui Fiachra (Ó Catháin Uí Fiachrach). At first, O'Cahan held the title chief of Cenel Ianna. After expelling O'Drennan (Ó Draighneán), chief of Cenel Sedna, O'Cahan was henceforth known as chief of Cenel Sedna. The earliest recorded O'Cahan was Eoghan O'Cahan (Eogháin Ua Catháin), abbot of Clonfert (Cluan-fearta-Brennainn), County Galway, died 980 A.D.

== Naming conventions ==
The surname has been anglicised O'Cahan, Cahan, O'Kane, Kane, O'Keane, Keane, O'Kean, Kean, and similar variations thereof.

Male	Daughter	Wife (Long)	Wife (Short)
Ó Catháin	Ní Chatháin	Bean Uí Chatháin	Uí Chatháin

== History ==
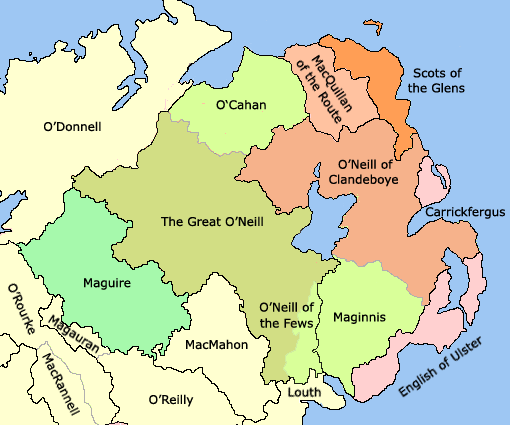
Ulster chiefdoms in the late 15th century.

The O'Cahan sept of Keenaght Glengiven first appear on record in 1138. A thirteenth-century chief of the family was Cumee na Gall O'Cahan. A heavily restored effigy at Dungiven Priory is sometimes associated with Cumee, although it appears to date to the last quarter of the fifteenth century, and seems to be that of a later member of the sept. Dunseverick Castle also formed part of the O'Cahan possessions until it was destroyed by Scottish troops under the command of Robert Monro during the Irish Rebellion of 1641.

The clan suffered a blow during the battle of Drumderg, where fifteen O'Cahan chieftains were slain in battle against the Normans and their gaelic allies.

Rory Dall O'Cahan, an Irish harpist of the 17th century most famous as the composer of Give Me Your Hand, may have penned the popular Irish tune the "Londonderry Air", in order to lament the destruction of O'Cahan power. Consequently, it may have been originally called "O'Cahan's Lament". The music is best known as the tune of the song "Danny Boy".

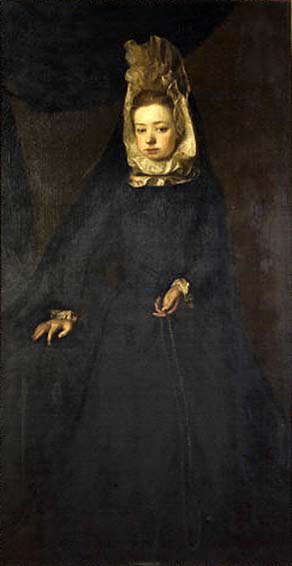
Portrait of Margaret O'Cahan by Garret Morphy

By the late 16th-century, "O'Cahan's Country" became the county of Coleraine. The majority of Ó Catháin chiefs fled Ulster in the Flight of the Earls in 1607, and under the terms of Surrender and regrant they forfeited their lands to the English crown. During the subsequent Plantation of Ulster, County Coleraine along with parts of counties Antrim, Donegal, and Tyrone, were merged to form County Londonderry. After the Flight of the Earls in 1607, Donnell Ballagh O'Cahan, Chief of the Ó Catháin (and at one time knighted by the English Crown), was captured and sent to the Tower of London, where he died in 1626. There has been no Chief since.

== See also ==
- Gaelic nobility of Ireland
- Manus O'Cahan's Regiment
- Clan Buchanan
- Clan Munro
