= Archie Kean =

Scottish footballer

Personal information
- Full name: Archibald Kean
- Date of birth: 30 September 1894
- Place of birth: Parkhead, Scotland
- Height: 5 ft 7 in (1.70 m)
- Position: Inside forward

Senior career*
Years	Team	Apps	(Gls)
–	Parkhead		
–	Croy Celtic		
1921–1922	Clapton Orient	11	(0)
1922–1924	Lincoln City	76	(11)
1924–1925	Blackburn Rovers	0	(0)
1925–19??	Grantham		
- * Club domestic league appearances and goals

Archie Kean (30 September 1894 – after 1925) was a Scottish footballer who scored 11 goals from 87 appearances in the English Football League playing for Clapton Orient and Lincoln City. He played as an inside forward. Before leaving Scotland, he played for Parkhead and Croy Celtic, and after leaving Lincoln City he joined Blackburn Rovers, though he never played league football for that club, and then played for Grantham of the Midland League.
