= Mick O'Kane =

Irish association footballer

Mick O'Kane was an Irish soccer player during the 1920s and 1930s.

O'Kane was a tough full back who played for Bohemians amongst others during his career in the League of Ireland. He played in the 1929 FAI Cup final defeat to Shamrock Rovers while at Bohs.

Mick captained Bohemians in the 1931 season and his brother Paddy followed as captain in 1936 to become the 2nd set of brothers to captain the club. The first were the Hooper brothers, Willie and Richard.
