= V2 (song) =

1985 song by That Petrol Emotion

Single by That Petrol Emotion
- B-side: "The Gonest Thing"
- Released: September 1985
- Recorded: 1 & 2 August 1985; Alvic Studios, London
- Genre: Indie
- Label: Noiseanoise
- Songwriter: John O'Neill
- Producers: Geoffrey Perrin & That Petrol Emotion

That Petrol Emotion singles chronology
"Keen" (1985)	"V2" (1985)	"It's a Good Thing" (1986)

"V2"
- 12" version cover

Single by That Petrol Emotion
- B-side: The Gonest Thing; Happiness Drives Me Round The Bend
- Released: 1985
- Recorded: 1 & 2 August 1985; Alvic Studios, London
- Genre: Indie
- Label: Noiseanoise
- Songwriter: John O'Neill
- Producers: Geoffrey Perrin & That Petrol Emotion

"V2" is a 1985 non-album single by That Petrol Emotion.

== Reception ==
John Leland at Spin said it was, "a driving shuffle beat and guitar song that lets the drums take it higher. Remember those halcyon postpunk days when repetition built intensity? These guys do."

== Track listing 7" ==
Side A
No.	Title	Written by	Length
1.	"V2"	John O'Neill

Side B
No.	Title	Written by	Length
1.	"The Gonest Thing"	John O'Neill

== Track listing 12" ==
Side A
No.	Title	Written by	Length
1.	"V2"	John O'Neill

Side B
No.	Title	Written by	Length
1.	"The Gonest Thing"	John O'Neill
2.	"Happiness Drives Me Round The Bend"	Sean O'Neill

== Personnel ==
- Steve Mack - Vocals
- John O'Neill - Guitar
- Raymond Gorman - Guitar
- Damian O'Neill - Bass Guitar
- Ciaran McLaughlin - Drums
