= Keene, Texas =

- City
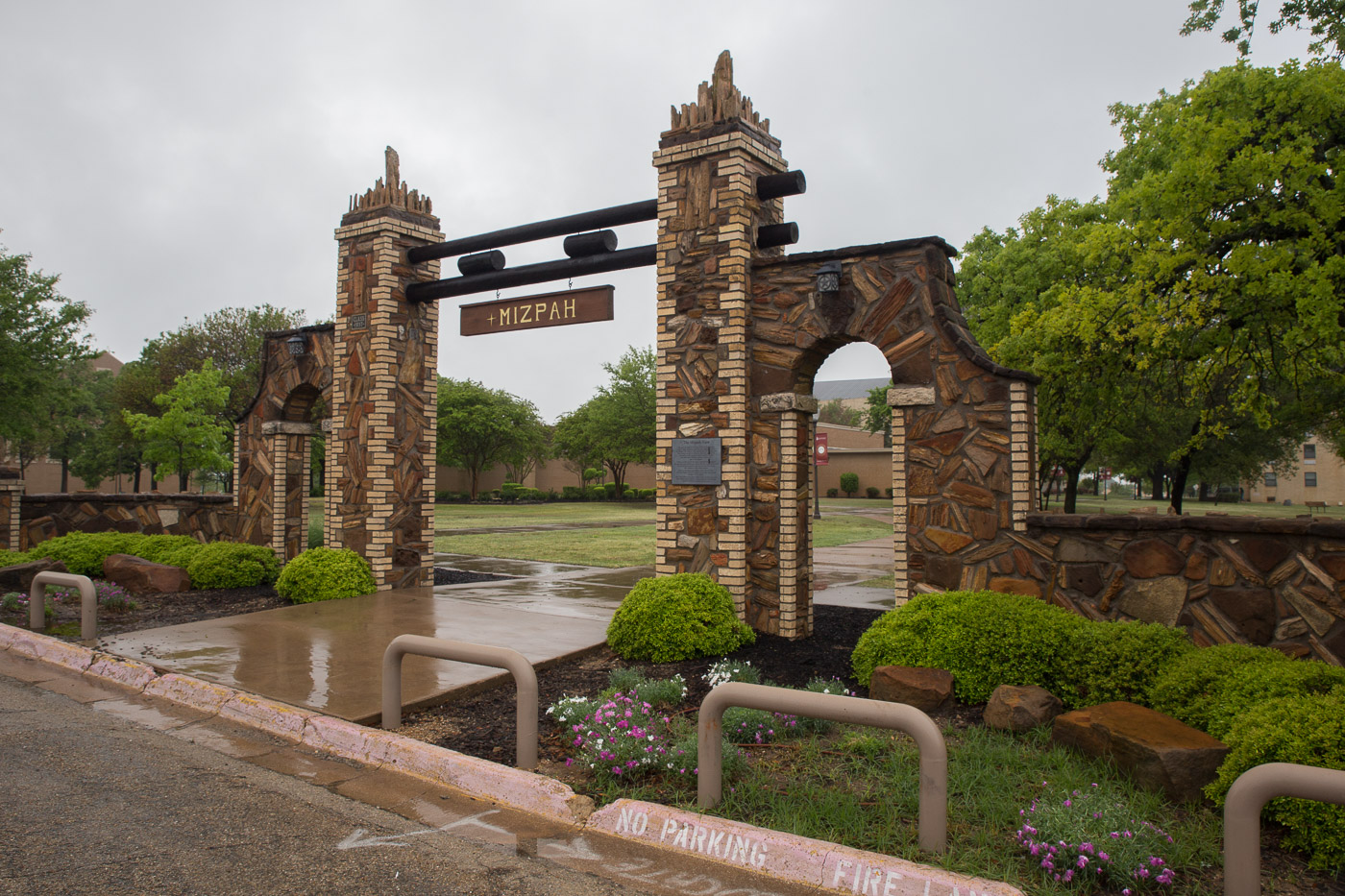
- Mizpah Gate in Keene,TX
- Interactive map of Keene, Texas
- Location in Texas Location in the United States
- Coordinates: 32°23′20″N 97°20′39″W
- Country: United States
- State: Texas
- County: Johnson

Area
  - Total: 5.04 sq mi (13.05 km^{2})
  - Land: 4.96 sq mi (12.84 km^{2})
  - Water: 0.081 sq mi (0.21 km^{2})
- Elevation: 896 ft (273 m)

Population (2020)
  - Total: 6,387
  - Density: 1,288/sq mi (497.4/km^{2})
- Time zone: UTC-6 (Central)
  - Summer (DST): UTC-5 (CDT)
- ZIP code: 76059
- Area code: 817
- FIPS code: 48-38548
- GNIS feature ID: 2410170
- Website: www.keenetx.com

Keene is a city in Johnson County, Texas, United States. Its population was 6,387 in 2020.

== Geography ==
Keene is located in central Johnson County and is bordered to the west by Cleburne, the county seat. U.S. Route 67 runs through the southern side of the city, leading east 7 miles (11 km) to Alvarado and west 5 miles (8 km) to Cleburne.

According to the United States Census Bureau, Keene has a total area of 5.0 square miles (13.0 km^{2}), of which 4.9 square miles (12.8 km^{2}) are land and 0.1 sq mi (0.2 km^{2}), or 1.66%, is covered by water. Keene sits on a regional watershed divide, with the northern and eastern sides of the city draining to Turkey Creek, part of the Trinity River watershed, and the southern and western sides draining to East Buffalo Creek, part of the Brazos River watershed.

== Demographics ==
Historical population
Census	Pop.	Note	%±
1960	1,532		—
1970	2,440		59.3%
1980	3,013		23.5%
1990	3,944		30.9%
2000	5,003		26.9%
2010	6,106		22.0%
2020	6,387		4.6%
2023 (est.)	6,860		7.4%
U.S. Decennial Census

=== 2020 census ===
As of the 2020 census , Keene had a population of 6,387 people, 2,096 households, and 1,470 families.

The median age was 32.8 years. About 24.8% of residents were under 18 and 14.9% of residents were 65 or older. For every 100 females, there were 89.2 males, and for every 100 females 18 and over, there were 85.4 males.

About 75.9% lived in urban areas, while 24.1% lived in rural areas.

Of the 2,096 households in Keene, 38.4% had children under 18 living in them, 49.0% were married-couple households, 16.0% were a male householder with no spouse or partner, and 30.1% were households with a female householder with no spouse or partner. About 24.3% of all households were made up of individuals, and 11.4% had someone living alone who was 65 or older.

Of the 2,333 housing units, 10.2% were vacant. The homeowner vacancy rate was 2.3% and the rental vacancy rate was 9.2%.

Racial composition as of the 2020 census
Race	Number	Percent
White	3,595	56.3%
Black or African American	296	4.6%
American Indian and Alaska Native	91	1.4%
Asian	116	1.8%
Native Hawaiian and Other Pacific Islander	438	6.9%
Some other race	776	12.1%
Two or more races	1,075	16.8%
Hispanic or Latino (of any race)	2,065	32.3%

=== 2010 census ===
As of the census of 2010, 6,106 people, 1,923 households, and 1,417 families resided in the city. The population density was 1,238.5 inhabitants per square mile (478.2/km^{2}). The 2,204 housing units were 12.7% vacant.

In 2010, the racial makeup of the city was 71.2% White, 6.1% African American, 0.9% Native American, 2.5% Asian, 5.3% Pacific Islander, 11.0% some other race, and 2.8% from two or more races. Hispanics or Latinos of any race were 30.3% of the population.

Of the 1,923 households in 2010, 41.8% had children under 18, 52.5% were married couples living together, 15.2% had a female householder with no husband present, and 26.3% were not families. About 20.5% of all households were made up of individuals, and 7.6% were someone living alone who was 65 or older. The average household size was 2.97, and the average family size was 3.37.

The city's age distribution was 27.6% under 18, 14.9% from 18 to 24, 26.8% from 25 to 44, 24.6% from 45 to 64, and 13.1% were 65 or older. The median age was 30.4 years. For every 100 females, there were 91.5 males. For every 100 females 18 and over, there were 86.5 males.

=== 2013–2017 American Community Survey ===
For the period 2013–2017, the estimated median annual income for a household in the city was $41,869 and for a family was $52,713. Male full-time workers had a median income of $45,345 versus $34,338 for females. The per capita income for the city was $18,066. About 14.9% of families and 17.0% of the total population were below the poverty line, including 20.6% of those under 18 and 16.3% of those 65 or over.

== Media ==
In addition to the Dallas-Fort Worth media, news related to the city of Keene is covered by the Keene Star and Cleburne Times-Review. The latter newspaper covers Johnson and Somervell Counties.

Radio stations include KHFX, which has a country music format, and KJRN, the listener-supported, Christian radio station of Southwestern Adventist University.

== Education ==
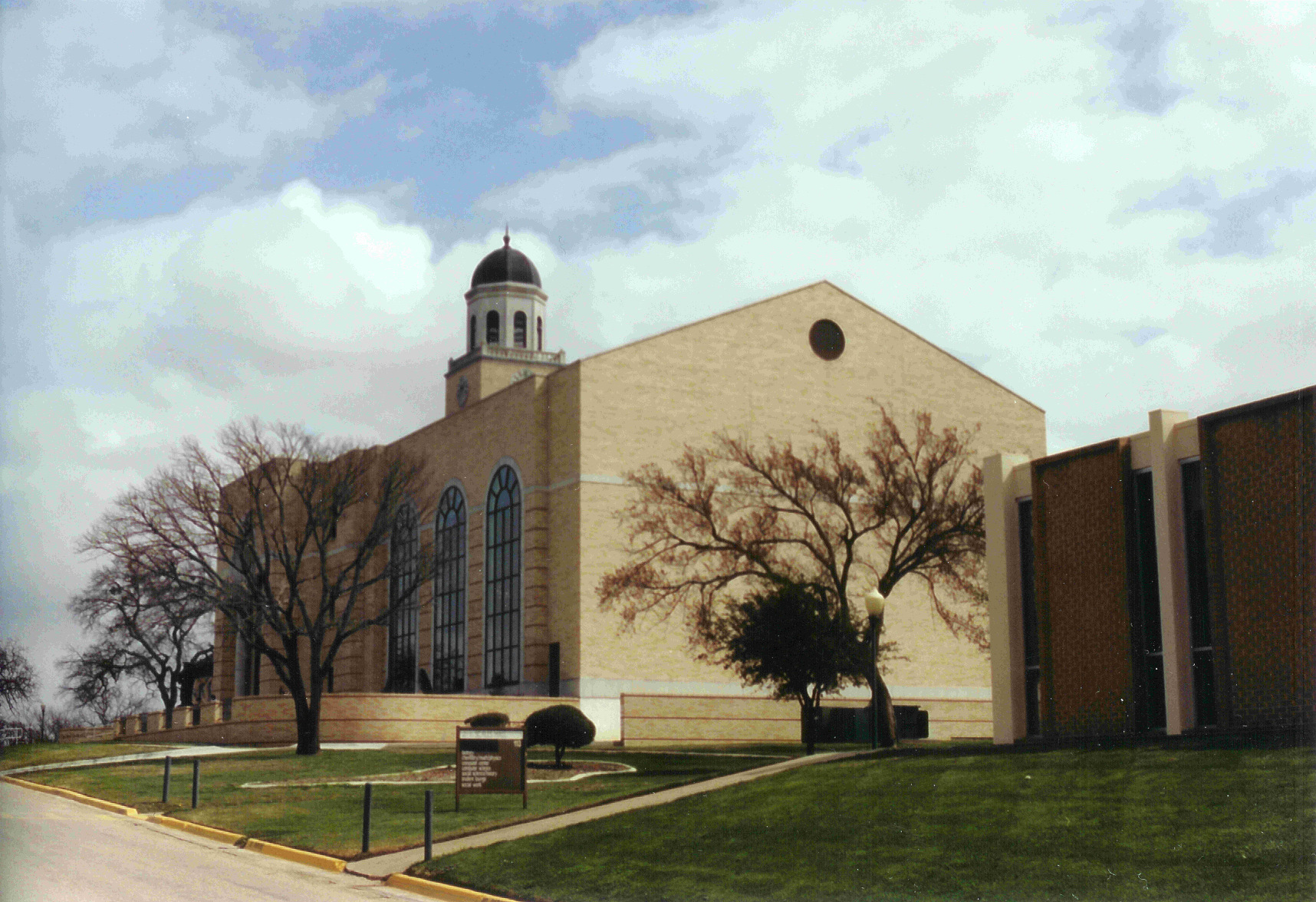
The Chan Shun Centennial Library at Southwestern Adventist University

The Keene Independent School District provides public education to the area. It includes Keene Elementary School, Keene Junior High, and Keene High School.

The two private schools in the city are Keene Adventist Elementary School (kindergarten - grade 8), and Chisholm Trail Academy (grades 9–12). Both schools, along with Southwestern Adventist University (a private liberal arts university in Keene, which is currently the only four-year institution of higher learning in Johnson County), are affiliated with the Seventh-day Adventist Church.

== Parks ==
Elisa Carver Park is located in the heart of Keene and includes softball, soccer and tee ball fields, volleyball and basketball courts, walking trail, playground, picnic area, and nine-hole disc golf course. There is also a park by the privately run Keene Adventist Elementary School.

== Sports ==
Keene is home to semiprofessional soccer club Keene FC, which plays in the United Premier Soccer League.
