= Keane =

Keane may refer to:

- Keane (band), an English band
- Keane (company), an IT consulting firm based in Boston
- Keane (surname), including a list of people with the name
- Keane Mulready-Woods (died 2020), Irish male murder victim
- The Keane Brothers, American duo, a.k.a. Keane
- Miss Keane, a teacher of Pokey Oaks from The Powerpuff Girls
- Keane (2004 film), a film by Lodge Kerrigan

== See also ==
- Kean (disambiguation)
