= The Undertones discography =

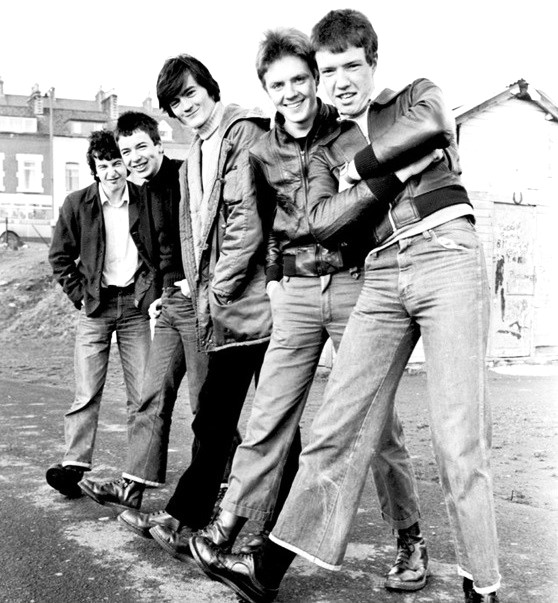
- The Undertones in 1979
- Studio albums: 6
- EPs: 3
- Compilation albums: 14
- Singles: 20
- Video albums: 2
- Box sets: 2

This is the discography of Northern Irish rock band the Undertones. Summarised are all studio album, single, compilation album, and EP releases in addition to their release dates and respective chart positions.

== Albums ==
=== Studio albums ===
Title	Album details	Peak chart positions		
Title	Album details	UK	NZ	SWE
The Undertones	Released: 6 May 1979; Label: Sire; Formats: LP, MC, 8-track	13	41	—
Hypnotised	Released: 18 April 1980; Label: Sire; Formats: LP, MC	6	33	29
Positive Touch	Released: 4 May 1981; Label: Ardeck; Formats: LP, MC	17	—	—
The Sin of Pride	Released: 7 March 1983; Label: Ardeck; Formats: LP, MC	46	33	—
Get What You Need	Released: 30 September 2003; Label: Sanctuary; Formats: CD	—	—	—
Dig Yourself Deep	Released: 15 October 2007; Label: Cooking Vinyl; Formats: CD	—	—	—
"—" denotes releases that did not chart or were not released in that territory.

=== Compilation albums ===
Title	Album details	Peak chart positions		Certifications
Title	Album details	UK	NZ	Certifications
All Wrapped Up	Released: November 1983; Label: Ardeck; Formats: 2xLP, LP, MC	67	49	
Cher O'Bowlies – The Pick of the Undertones	Released: June 1986; Label: EMI; Formats: CD, LP, MC	96	—	
The Peel Sessions Album	Released: 18 December 1989; Label: Strange Fruit; Formats: CD, LP, MC	—	—	
The Best Of: The Undertones – Teenage Kicks	Released: 20 September 1993; Label: Castle Communications; Formats: CD, MC	45	—	
True Confessions (Singles=A’s+B’s)	Released: 13 September 1999; Label: Essential/Castle Music; Formats: 2xCD	121	—	BPI: Silver
The Best of the Undertones – Teenage Kicks	Released: 1 September 2003; Label: Sanctuary; Formats: CD	35	—	
Listening In: Radio Sessions 1979–1982	Released: March 2004; Label: Sanctuary; Formats: CD	—	—	
An Anthology	Released: 22 September 2008; Label: Salvo/Ardeck; Formats: 2xCD	—	—	
Teenage Kicks – The Very Best of the Undertones	Released: October 2010; Label: Salvo/Ardeck; Formats: CD	—	—	BPI: Silver
Ultimate Undertones	Released: 2011; Label: Salvo/Ardeck; Formats: CD	—	—	
An Introduction to the Undertones	Released: 3 June 2013; Label: Salvo; Formats: CD+DVD	—	—	
The Very Best Of	Released: 4 November 2016; Label: Metro Select; Formats: 2xCD	—	—	
Hard to Beat	Released: 27 July 2018; Label: BMG/Ardeck; Formats: 2xCD	—	—	
West Bank Songs 1978–1983 – A Best Of	Released: 28 February 2020; Label: BMG/Salvo/Ardeck; Formats: LP	—	—	
Dig What You Need	Released: 11 March 2022; Label: Dimple Discs; Formats: LP, CD, download	—	—	
"—" denotes releases that did not chart or were not released in that territory.

=== Box sets ===
Title	Album details
The Singles Box Set	Released: May 2000; Label: Essential/Castle Music; Formats: 12xCD
Singles	Released: 21 April 2018; Label: Ardeck/Union Square Production/BMG; Formats: 13x7" vinyl

=== Video albums ===
Title	Album details
6 Tracks	Released: 1984; Label: Sesam/EMI/Ardeck, Picture Music; Formats: VHS
The Story of the Undertones: Teenage Kicks	Released: 26 January 2004; Label: Sanctuary; Formats: DVD

== EPs ==
Title	Album details	Peak chart positions	
Title	Album details	UK	UK Indie
Teenage Kicks	Released: September 1978; Label: Good Vibrations, Sire; Formats: 7"	31	—
The Peel Sessions	Released: November 1986; Label: Strange Fruit; Formats: 12"	—	6
Teenage Kicks	Released: May 1994; Label: Dojo Limited; Formats: 7"; Reissue of 1978 EP	91	—
"—" denotes releases that did not chart or were not released in that territory.

== Singles ==
Title	Year	Peak chart positions			Certifications	Album
Title	Year	UK	IRE	NL	Certifications	Album
"Teenage Kicks" (Note: "Teenage Kicks" was released as an EP, as well as a promo single in the UK; the song was also released in North America and Europe as a single in 1980.)	1978	31	—	—	BPI: Platinum	Non-album singles
"Get Over You"	1979	57	—	—		Non-album singles
"Jimmy Jimmy"	1979	16	—	—		The Undertones
"Here Comes the Summer"	1979	34	—	—		The Undertones
"You've Got My Number (Why Don't You Use It!)"	1979	32	25	—		Non-album single
"My Perfect Cousin"	1980	9	9	—		Hypnotised
"Wednesday Week"	1980	11	—	—		Hypnotised
"It's Going to Happen!"	1981	18	10	49		Positive Touch
"Julie Ocean"	1981	41	30	—		Positive Touch
"When Saturday Comes" (Note: "When Saturday Comes" was only released as a promo single in the UK, but it was released as a single in the Netherlands.)	1981	—	—	—		Positive Touch
"Beautiful Friend"	1982	131	—	—		Non-album single
"The Love Parade"	1982	97	—	—		The Sin of Pride
"Got to Have You Back"	1983	82	—	—		The Sin of Pride
"Chain of Love"	1983	104	—	—		The Sin of Pride
"Teenage Kicks" (reissue)	1983	60	—	—		All Wrapped Up
"Here Comes the Summer" (reissue)	1983	—	—	—		All Wrapped Up
"My Perfect Cousin" (reissue)	1983	88	—	—		All Wrapped Up
"Save Me"	1986	—	—	—		Cher O'Bowlies – The Pick of the Undertones
"Thrill Me"	2003	—	—	—		Get What You Need
"Much Too Late"	2013	—	—	—		Non-album single
"—" denotes releases that did not chart or were not released in that territory.
