= Roger Béchirian =

- Genres: Rock; pop
- Occupations: Record producer; recording and mixing engineer
- Website: Roger Béchirian official website

Roger Béchirian is an English engineer and record producer. Béchirian was a key player in the British new wave scene of the late 1970s and early 1980s, best known for his work with Nick Lowe, Lene Lovich, Paul Carrack, Elvis Costello, the Undertones, Dave Edmunds, the Monkees, the Flamin' Groovies, and Squeeze. He was also a member of the pseudonymous new wave group Blanket of Secrecy, which issued one album in 1982. More recently, Béchirian has worked with Bell X1.

== Life and career ==
He became renowned for his mixing work for Stiff Records, which paved the way for his first co-produced hit, Lene Lovich's "Lucky Number". He is widely credited for moulding the sound of some of that period's hitmakers including Elvis Costello, the Undertones, and Squeeze.

Building on his early successes, Béchirian spent his time working between the UK and the US, developing and producing new and established artists for major and independent label releases. By the beginning of the new millennium, he added management to his skill set. He discovered and developed Tom McRae signing him to db/BMG/Arista Records, whose emergence led to a Q Award and nominations for a Mercury Prize, and a Brit Award. At the same time, he managed Irish four-piece Bell X1, signing them to Island/Universal in London, garnering four Choice Music Prize 'Irish Album of the Year' nominations and producing their multi-platinum album, Flock.

== Discography overview ==
Note: engineered (e), mixed (m), co-produced (cp), produced (p)

Elvis Costello: e-m-cp-p Albums:

- My Aim Is True (remixes)
- This Years Model
- Armed Forces
- Get Happy!!
- Trust

Singles:

- "(What's So Funny 'Bout) Peace, Love, and Understanding"
- "Oliver's Army"
- "Alison" (remix)
- "(I Don't Want to Go to) Chelsea"
- "Accidents Will Happen"
- "Pump It Up"
- "I Can't Stand Up for Falling Down"
- "Radio Radio"
- "Big Tears"
- "Green Shirt"
- "High Fidelity"
- "New Lace Sleeves"
- "Talking in the Dark"
- "New Amsterdam"
- "Riot Act"
- "Clubland"
- "From a Whisper to a Scream"
- "Watch Your Step"

Squeeze: e-m-p Albums:

- East Side Story

Singles:

- "Is That Love"
- "Tempted"
- "Labelled with Love"
- "Messed Around"

The Undertones: e-m-p Albums:

- The Undertones
- Hypnotised
- Positive Touch

Singles:

- "Get Over You"
- "Jimmy Jimmy"
- "Here Comes the Summer"
- "You've Got My Number (Why Don't You Use It?)"
- "My Perfect Cousin"
- "Wednesday Week"
- "It's Going to Happen!
- "Julie Ocean"

Nick Lowe: e-m-cp-p Albums:

- Jesus of Cool
- Nick the Knife
- The Abominable Showman

Singles:

- "So It Goes"
- "Marie Provost"
- "Endless Sleep"
- "Halfway to Paradise"
- "I Love the Sound of Breaking Glass"
- "Little Hitler"
- "American Squirm"
- "Crackin' Up"
- "Cruel to Be Kind"
- "Cool Reaction"
- "Ragin' Eyes"
- "Wish You Were Here"

Graham Parker: e-m Albums:

- Howlin' Wind
- Heat Treatment
- Stick to Me

Twist: e-m-cp Albums:

- This Is Your Life

Singles:

- "This Is Your Life"
- "Ads"

The Rumour: e-m-cp Albums:

- Frogs Sprouts Clogs and Krauts

Singles:

- "Emotional Traffic"
- "Frozen Years"
- "Tired of Waiting"

The Jam: e

- "Going Underground" (single)

Lene Lovich: e-m-p Albums:

- Stateless
- Flex

Singles:

- "Lucky Number"
- "Little Bird"
- "Too Tender to Touch"
- "I Think We're Alone Now"

Wang Chung: e-m-p Albums:

- Huang Chung

Singles:

- "Hold Back the Tears"
- "China"
- "Ti Na Na"

Carlene Carter: e-m-p-cp Albums:

- Carlene Carter
- C'est C Bon
- Blue Nun

Singles:

- "When You Comin' Back"
- "Too Many Teardrops"
- "Love Like a Glove"
- "Meant It for a Minute"

Dave Edmunds: e-m Albums:

- Tracks on Wax 4
- Repeat When Necessary

Singles:

- "Deborah"
- "Television"
- "A1 on the Jukebox"
- "Girls Talk"
- "Queen of Hearts"
- "Crawling from the Wreckage"

The Trash Can Sinatras: e-m-p Albums:

- Cake

Singles:

- "Only Tongue Can Tell"
- "Obscurity Knocks"

Bell X1: m-p Albums:

- Music in Mouth
- Flock
- Blue Lights on the Runway (re-mixes)

Singles:

- "Man on Mir"
- "White Water Song"
- "Tongue"
- "Snakes and Snakes"
- "Alphabet Soup"
- "Eve, the Apple of My Eye"
- "Next to You"
- "Bigger Than Me"
- "Flame"
- "Rocky Took a Lover"
- "The Great Defector"-m
- "The Ribs of a Broken Umbrella"-m

Tom McRae: cp-m Albums:

- Tom McRae

Singles:

- "You Cut Her Hair"
- "Walking to Hawaii" rm

Flamin' Groovies: e-m-cp

- Jumpin' in the Night

The Attractions: e-m-p

- Mad About the Wrong Boy

The Shakin' Pyramids: e-m-p

- Celts and Cobras

The Monkees: e-m-p

- Pool It! (album)

The dB's: e-m-p

- "Judy" (single)

Tony Koklin: e-m-p

- Time Chaser

Robert Ellis Orrall: e-m-p

- Special Pain
- Walking Thru Landmines

Rockpile: e-m

- Pile of Rocks

The Photos: e-m-p

- The Photos

Siouxsie and the Banshees: e-m

- "New Skin" (from Showgirls)

Blanket of Secrecy: e-m-p

- Ears Have Walls

The Passion Puppets: e-m-p

- "Like Dust"

Dirty Looks: e-m

- Dirty Looks

The Pretenders: e-m

- "Stop Your Sobbing" (single)

Stewart Agnew Band: e-m-p

- Stewart Agnew

Bear Driver: cp

- "Wolves" (single)

e and ae:

- Joe Jackson
- Paul Jones
- The Sex Pistols
- The Bay City Rollers
- TV21
- The Three Degrees
- Wreckless Eric
- Clive Langer
- Barbara Dixon
- Jona Lewie
- Larry Wallis
- Telephone
- Maxine Nightingale
- Shirley Bassey
- Kathy Kirby
- Simon May
- Paul & Barry Ryan
- Dolly Mixture
- Hello
- Clover
- Huey Lewis
- The Damned
- The Belle Stars
- Marc Bolan
- The Three Degrees
- Jethro Tull
- David Essex
