= Positive Touch =

Studio album by the Undertones
- Released: 5 May 1981
- Recorded: 4 January–10 February 1981
- Studio: Wisseloord Studios, Holland
- Genre: Rock; pop rock; new wave
- Length: 37:49
- Label: Ardeck-EMI (UK); Harvest (US); Rykodisc (US CD reissue); Dojo Records (UK CD reissue); Sanctuary Records (UK CD reissue)
- Producer: Roger Bechirian

The Undertones chronology
Hypnotised (1980)	Positive Touch (1981)	The Sin of Pride (1983)

Professional ratings
Review scores
Source	Rating
AllMusic	4.5/5 stars
Blender	3/5 stars
Select	4/5
Smash Hits	9/10
Spin Alternative Record Guide	8/10
The Village Voice	B+

Positive Touch is a 1981 album by the Undertones. The album, the third to be released by the band and the last to be produced by Roger Bechirian, was recorded between January and February 1981 at Wisseloord studios in The Netherlands. The LP was released in May that year, reaching number 17 in the UK Albums Chart.

The original LP release included the UK chart hits "It's Going to Happen!", which reached number 18 in the UK Singles Chart in May 1981, and an album version of "Julie Ocean", which reached number 41 upon release in July the same year.

== Background ==
The majority of the songs released upon Positive Touch were more experimental than the band's previous material, with instruments such as pianos, recorders, and brass instruments added to the group's sound. Guitarist Damian O'Neill recalled: "We'd moved away from the Ramones. Dexys was my thing. And we were listening to a lot of the Stones, Aftermath in particular—it's more 1966 than 1981—Love, Blues Magoos, that kind of sound, which was out of sync with the likes of Duran Duran. But it was also out of sync with what we were doing a year earlier. It wasn't a complete failure: 'It's Going To Happen!' was top 20, but that turned out to be our last hit."

In 2009, bassist Michael Bradley reflected on the recording sessions for Positive Touch, stating: "We went into [the recording sessions], and came out of [them], very happy with the direction we were going in. It wasn't based on any great discussions within the band; it was a natural progression for us. The first LP was based on what we were listening to in [the] O'Neills' front room. Positive Touch came out of what we'd been listening to since that."

== Cover artwork ==
The sleeve artwork for Positive Touch was designed by Bush Hollyhead, who designed the sleeve artwork for many of the band's albums and singles. The original sleeve depicted imagery intended to reflect each song title embossed upon the cover, which is largely plain white.

== Lyrical inspiration ==
Although the majority of the songs on Positive Touch were inspired by the same subjects as the songs released upon their two previous albums (generally teenage angst), Positive Touch was the first and only album released by the Undertones to contain songs which drew lyrical inspiration from the Troubles relating to the political and social background in which the members of the band had been born and raised, although lyrical references to the Troubles were somewhat oblique.

The single "It's Going to Happen!" was directly inspired by the 1981 hunger strikes in Northern Ireland and was performed on Top of the Pops days after one of the participants in these hunger strikes, Bobby Sands, died of starvation. Three further songs upon the LP ("You're Welcome", "Crisis of Mine" and "Sigh and Explode") were also lyrically inspired by the Troubles, although none of the material the band were to subsequently release drew influence from these sources."

== Critical reception ==
Although Positive Touch was less commercially successful than either of the albums the band had previously released, the album also received favourable reviews from several music critics. A review in the Daily Record describes the album as being "much more sophisticated" than their debut and sophomore efforts, and the material upon Positive Touch had propelled the Undertones to a "new level in the rock hierarchy".

== Track listing ==
Side one
No.	Title	Written by	Length
1.	"Fascination"	J. J. O'Neill	2:19
2.	"Julie Ocean"	J. J. O'Neill	1:45
3.	"Life's Too Easy"	J. J. O'Neill, Michael Bradley, Damian O'Neill	2:30
4.	"Crisis of Mine"	J. J. O'Neill	2:23
5.	"You're Welcome"	J. J. O'Neill	2:43
6.	"His Good Looking Girlfriend"	J. J. O'Neill, Michael Bradley, Damian O'Neill	2:35
7.	"The Positive Touch"	J. J. O'Neill	2:16

Side two
No.	Title	Written by	Length
1.	"When Saturday Comes"	J. J. O'Neill	2:49
2.	"It's Going to Happen!"	Damian O'Neill, Michael Bradley	3:34
3.	"Sigh And Explode"	Damian O'Neill	2:44
4.	"I Don't Know"	J. J. O'Neill, Michael Bradley, Damian O'Neill	2:17
5.	"Hannah Doot"	J. J. O'Neill	2:50
6.	"Boy Wonder"	Damian O'Neill, Michael Bradley	2:04
7.	"Forever Paradise"	J. J. O'Neill	2:54

- Sides one and two were combined as tracks 1–14 on CD and download reissues.

Bonus tracks (issued on CD and download releases only)
No.	Title	Written by	Length
15.	"Fairly in the Money Now"	Tommy Tate and The Torpedoes*	2:33
16.	"Julie Ocean" (7" single version)	J. J. O'Neill	3:36
17.	"Kiss in the Dark"	J. J. O'Neill, Michael Bradley,	2:34
18.	"Beautiful Friend"	J. J. O'Neill, Michael Bradley, Damian O'Neill	3:26
19.	"Life's Too Easy" (7" single version)	J. J. O'Neill, Michael Bradley, Damian O'Neill	2:40

Bonus tracks (issued on Positive Touch/The Sin of Pride 2CD release only)
No.	Title	Written by	Length
15.	"Fairly in the Money Now"	Tommy Tate and The Torpedoes*	2:34
16.	"Beautiful Friend"	J. J. O'Neill, Michael Bradley, Damian O'Neill	3:27
17.	"Life's Too Easy" (single version)	J. J. O'Neill, Michael Bradley, Damian O'Neill	2:43
18.	"Julie Ocean" (single version)	J. J. O'Neill	3:36
19.	"Kiss in the Dark"	J. J. O'Neill, Michael Bradley,	2:33
20.	"Untouchable" (Peel session)	Damian O'Neill	3:19
21.	"The Love Parade" (Peel session)	Damian O'Neill, Michael Bradley	4:08
22.	"Luxury" (Peel session)	J. J. O'Neill	2:28
23.	"The Sin of Pride" (Peel session)	Damian O'Neill, Michael Bradley	3:44

- Tommy Tate and The Torpedoes was a pseudonym for Damian O'Neill.

== Accolades ==
- Positive Touch was voted number 28 in the 1981 NME 'Albums of the Year'.
- In 1986, one album track from the Positive Touch album, "When Saturday Comes", became the inspiration for the title of the UK football fanzine of the same name. This song was not released as a single in the United Kingdom, but was released as a single in the Netherlands.

== Personnel ==
The Undertones

- Feargal Sharkey - lead vocals
- John O'Neill - guitar, vocals
- Damian O'Neill - guitar, keyboards, vocals
- Michael Bradley - bass, recorder (on "Hannah Doot"), vocals
- Billy Doherty - drums

Additional musicians

- Paul Carrack - piano (on "Life's too Easy" and "Fascination")
- Neill King - trumpet (on "It's Going to Happen!" and "His Good Looking Girlfriend")
- Dick Blewett - saxophone (on "It's Going to Happen!" and "His Good Looking Girlfriend")
