= The Sin of Pride =

Studio album by the Undertones
- Released: 7 March 1983
- Studios: Playground Studios, Camden Town, London
- Genres: Soul; Motown
- Length: 38:53
- Labels: Ardeck-EMI (UK); Harvest (US); Rykodisc (US CD reissue); Sanctuary Records (UK CD reissue)
- Producers: Mike Hedges, the Undertones

The Undertones chronology
Positive Touch (1981)	The Sin of Pride (1983)	Get What You Need (2003)

The Sin of Pride is the fourth and final album to be released by the original line-up of the Undertones. The album, which was produced by Mike Hedges, was recorded between the autumn of 1982 and the spring of 1983. Unlike the three previous albums released by the Undertones, which primarily consisted of guitar-oriented music, The Sin of Pride drew much inspiration from both Soul music and Motown. The band's lead singer, Feargal Sharkey, has opined The Sin of Pride as being "the finest Undertones album."

Released on 7 March 1983, The Sin of Pride reached number 43 in the UK charts. Largely due to the commercial failure of The Sin of Pride, the Undertones disbanded just four months after the album's release.

Three singles were taken from The Sin of Pride: "Got To Have You Back", "Chain of Love" and "The Love Parade". (Note: Two single versions of "The Love Parade" were released; one version commercially available upon the LP and an extended 12-inch single version.) However, none of the singles released reached the top 40 in the UK Singles Chart.

== Background ==
Tensions between members of the band had increased in the year prior to the release of The Sin of Pride. Declining chart success had been a major factor behind this discord. Bassist Michael Bradley would reflect in 2009: "It would be untrue to say The Sin of Pride is the sound of the Undertones breaking up, but my memories of the recording sessions are not the happiest. The tensions between Feargal and the rest of the band—John especially—were beginning to become more noticeable. Of course, if Positive Touch had been a huge success, we could have worked around those tensions. But it didn't, and suddenly, when we looked below us, the wheels were starting to come off."

== Cover photography ==
The front cover of The Sin of Pride depicts the Undertones stood aside and sat upon a sofa covered with a white sheet with a stained glass image of Saint Columba projected across them. White sheeting is also draped across the wall behind them. The image itself was taken inside an 8-track demo studio the band had constructed in Abercorn Road, Derry, in 1982. The rear cover depicts the same location minus the band or any form of illumination or projected imagery. The lyrics of each song upon The Sin of Pride are also printed upon the rear cover of the album.

== Critical reception ==
Professional ratings
Review scores
Source	Rating
AllMusic	4/5 stars
Record Mirror	4/5 stars

Although The Sin of Pride received positive reviews in the music press, the album charted at number 43. Nonetheless, the album has been described by AllMusic as "one of the great unsung albums of the early '80s."

On the subject of the actual poor sales of this album, Feargal Sharkey would recollect in 1986: "People still wanted us to rewrite the first album, and we weren't prepared to do that."

== Track listing ==
Side one
No.	Title	Written by	Length
1.	"Got To Have You Back"	Ivy Jo Hunter, Leon Ware, Stephen Bowden*	2:51
2.	"Valentine's Treatment"	Damian O'Neill, Michael Bradley	2:47
3.	"Luxury"	J. J. O'Neill	2:28
4.	"Love Before Romance"	Damian O'Neill	4:53
5.	"Untouchable"	Damian O'Neill	3:19
6.	"Bye Bye Baby Blue"	J. J. O'Neill, Michael Bradley	3:16

Side two
No.	Title	Written by	Length
1.	"Conscious"	Damian O'Neill	3:14
2.	"Chain of Love"	J. J. O'Neill	2:59
3.	"Soul Seven"	J. J. O'Neill	2:33
4.	"The Love Parade"	Damian O'Neill, Michael Bradley	3:26
5.	"Save Me"	William Robinson, Warren "Pete" Moore, Robert Rogers*	2:31
6.	"The Sin of Pride"	Damian O'Neill, Michael Bradley	4:36

- Sides one and two were combined as tracks 1–12 on CD and download reissues.

Bonus tracks (issued on CD and download releases only)
No.	Title	Written by	Length
13.	"The Love Parade" (12" version)	Damian O'Neill, Michael Bradley*	5:07
14.	"Like That"	J. J. O'Neill, Michael Bradley	3:04
15.	"You're Welcome" (live version)	J. J. O'Neill	3:48
16.	"Crisis of Mine" (live version)	J. J. O'Neill	3:30
17.	"Family Entertainment" (live version)	Damian O'Neill	2:52
18.	"Turning Blue"	J. J. O'Neill	2:35
19.	"Bye Bye Baby Blue" (12" Got To Have You Back single version)	J. J. O'Neill, Michael Bradley	3:17
20.	"Window Shopping for New Clothes"	J. J. O'Neill	2:14
21.	"Bittersweet"	J. J. O'Neill	5:07
22.	"You Stand So Close (But You're Never There)"	J. J. O'Neill, Damian O'Neill	3:24
23.	"I Can Only Dream"	J. J. O'Neill	7:49

Bonus tracks (issued on Positive Touch/The Sin of Pride 2 CD release only)
No.	Title	Written by	Length
22.	"I Can Only Dream"	J. J. O'Neill	5:29
23.	"You Stand So Close (But You're Never There)"	J. J. O'Neill, Damian O'Neill	3:08

- "Got To Have You Back" was a cover of the 1967 Isley Brothers single.
- "Save Me" was a cover of a song by The Miracles (later Smokey Robinson and The Miracles).
- The 12" version of "The Love Parade" was an extended version of the 7" single version.

== Personnel ==
The Undertones

- Feargal Sharkey – lead vocals
- John O'Neill – rhythm guitar
- Damian O'Neill – lead guitar, keyboards and backing vocals
- Michael Bradley – bass guitar, keyboards, backing vocals and co-lead vocals on "The Love Parade"
- Billy Doherty – drums

Additional musicians

- Caroline Lavelle – cello
- Dick Blewett – saxophone
- Dave Price – trumpet
- Anne Stephenson, Virginia Howes – violin
- Sylvia & The Sapphires – backing vocals
- The Rumour Brass – brass instruments on "Conscious"
- The Chanter Sisters – backing vocals on "The Love Parade"

Production

- Mike Hedges – engineering, mixing
- Leo Peppas – engineering
- Nigel Green – engineering
- Andy Pierce – remastering (2009 Compact Disc re-release)
