= Dig Yourself Deep =

Studio album by The Undertones
- Released: 15 October 2007
- Recorded: 2007
- Genre: Rock, pop punk
- Length: 32:45
- Label: Cooking Vinyl
- Producer: The Undertones (engineered and mixed by Mik O'Connell)

The Undertones chronology
Get What You Need (2003)	Dig Yourself Deep (2007)

Professional ratings
Review scores
Source	Rating
Allmusic	4/5 stars
This Is Fake DIY	4/5 stars

Dig Yourself Deep is a 2007 studio album by The Undertones. It is the band's second album with lead singer Paul McLoone, who replaced Feargal Sharkey when the band reformed in November 1999.

The track "Here Comes The Rain" has been played during live performances since 2005 including the band's appearance at the Glastonbury Festival in that year.

Tracks from this album and predecessor Get What You Need were remastered for the compilation Dig What You Need in 2022.

== Track listing ==
No.	Title	Written by	Length
1.	"Dig Yourself Deep"	John O'Neill	1:51
2.	"So Close"	J. O'Neill	1:39
3.	"Here Comes The Rain"	J. O'Neill	2:05
4.	"Everything You Say Is Right"	Michael Bradley	2:03
5.	"Him Not Me"	Michael Bradley	2:04
6.	"We All Talked About You"	Michael Bradley, Damian O'Neill	2:18
7.	"Fight My Corner"	J. O'Neill	2:57
8.	"Precious Little Wonder"	J. O'Neill	2:01
9.	"Tomorrow's Tears"	J. O'Neill	2:36
10.	"Easy Way Out"	J. O'Neill	2:14
11.	"Happy Valley"	J. O'Neill	2:35
12.	"Move Right In"	J. O'Neill	1:43
13.	"She's So Sweet"	Michael Bradley	2:20
14.	"I'm Recommending Me"	Michael Bradley	2:24

== Personnel ==
The Undertones

- Paul McLoone - lead vocals
- John O'Neill - guitar, backing vocals
- Damian O'Neill - guitar, keyboards, backing vocals
- Michael Bradley - bass, backing vocals
- Billy Doherty - drums
