= Get What You Need =

Studio album by The Undertones
- Released: 30 September 2003
- Recorded: 2003
- Genre: Rock
- Length: 41:00
- Label: Sanctuary
- Producer: Rory Donaghy

The Undertones chronology
| The Sin of Pride (1983) | Get What You Need (2003) | Dig Yourself Deep (2007) |

Professional ratings
Review scores
| Source | Rating |
|---|---|
| Allmusic | 4/5 stars |

Get What You Need is a 2003 studio album by an Irish power pop/punk rock band The Undertones. It is the band's first collection of new studio material since their reformation with new lead singer Paul McLoone, which occurred in November 1999. Allmusic stated in their review that "It's almost unthinkable, really, that Derry's fabled good-time teen punks of yesteryear would record and continue... let alone that their output would be anything less than embarrassing." The website also stated that "you have everything you need for a complete escape to more innocent, drunken, loutish times with a smile on the faces of everyone in your immediate vicinity" and recommended the album. Uncut Magazine gave a favorable review as well, remarking that its songs "inhabit the same ageless corner of garage band heaven as earlier classics". In contrast, Blender gave it two stars out of five—'mediocre'—and stated that "they sound more like a road-toughened bar band".

Tracks from this album and follow up Dig Yourself Deep were remastered for the compilation Dig What You Need in 2022.

== Track listing ==
| No. | Title | Written by | Length |
|---|---|---|---|
| 1. | "Thrill Me" | John O'Neill | 3:00 |
| 2. | "I Need Your Love The Way It Used To Be" | J. O'Neill | 2:26 |
| 3. | "Everything But You" | Michael Bradley | 3:23 |
| 4. | "Ride The Rough Escalator" | J. O'Neill, Damian O'Neill, Michael Bradley, Billy Doherty, Paul McLoone | 3:27 |
| 5. | "You Can't Say That" | J. O'Neill | 2:19 |
| 6. | "Enough" | Michael Bradley | 2:42 |
| 7. | "Touch" | J. O'Neill | 1:53 |
| 8. | "Girl Like You" | J. O'Neill, Michael Bradley | 3:53 |
| 9. | "The Cruellest Thing" | J. O'Neill | 2:18 |
| 10. | "Oh Please" | Michael Bradley | 2:45 |
| 11. | "Winter Sun" | J. O'Neill | 3:45 |
| 12. | "Joyland" | Michael Bradley | 3:05 |
| 13. | "Shut Down" | J. O'Neill |

Bonus MP3 tracks (only available in the GOODIES folder on the Enhanced CD release)
| No. | Title | Written by | Length |
|---|---|---|---|
| 1. | "Belly Up Instrumental" | J. O'Neill | 3:05 |
| 2. | "Girl Like You" (Old School Mix) | J. O'Neill, Michael Bradley | 2:39 |
| 3. | "Oh Please" (Demo version) | Michael Bradley | 2:42 |
| 4. | "Shut Down" (Demo version) | J. O'Neill | 2:34 |
| 5. | "The Cruellest Thing" (Demo version) | J. O'Neill | 2:29 |
| 6. | "Thrill Me" (Demo version) | J. O'Neill | 2:57 |

== Personnel ==
The Undertones

- Paul McLoone - lead vocals
- John O'Neill - guitar, backing vocals
- Damian O'Neill - guitar, keyboards, backing vocals
- Michael Bradley - bass, backing vocals
- Billy Doherty - drums
