= Teenage Kicks =

1978 debut single by the Undertones

Single by The Undertones

from the album The Undertones
- B-side: "True Confessions"
- Released: 14 October 1978
- Recorded: 15 June 1978
- Studio: Wizard Studios (Belfast)
- Genre: Punk rock; pop-punk; power pop; new wave
- Length: 2:28
- Label: Sire
- Songwriter: J. J. O'Neill

The Undertones singles chronology
"Teenage Kicks" (1978)	"Get Over You" (1979)

Teenage Kicks

EP by The Undertones
- Released: September 1978
- Recorded: 15 June 1978
- Studio: Wizard Studios (Belfast)
- Length: 7:51
- Labels: Good Vibrations; Sire
- Producer: Davy Shannon

Alternative cover
- Fold-out of sleeve of original Good Vibrations release of Teenage Kicks EP

Music video
- "Teenage Kicks" on YouTube

"Teenage Kicks" is the debut single by Northern Irish punk rock band the Undertones. Written in the summer of 1977 by J.J. O'Neill, the band's rhythm guitarist and principal songwriter, the song was recorded on 15 June 1978 and initially released that September on independent Belfast record label Good Vibrations, before the band signed to Sire Records on 2 October 1978.

Sire Records subsequently obtained all copyrights to the material released upon the Teenage Kicks EP and the song was re-released as a standard vinyl single on Sire's label on 14 October that year, reaching number 31 in the UK Singles Chart two weeks after its release.

The single was not included upon the original May 1979 release of the band's debut album The Undertones. The October 1979 re-release of this debut album included both "Teenage Kicks" and the Undertones' second single, "Get Over You".

Influential BBC Radio 1 DJ John Peel is known to have repeatedly stated "Teenage Kicks" to be his all-time favourite song, from 1978 until his death in 2004. When he first played the song on his show on 25 September, he played the song twice (something he had never previously done). Peel also requested sections of the lyrics of the song be engraved upon his tombstone.

== Impact ==
=== John Peel ===
Upon first hearing "Teenage Kicks" in September 1978, BBC Radio 1 DJ John Peel is reported to have burst into tears, and readily admitted to still being moved to tears upon hearing the song in interviews granted to journalists up until his death. To judge songs he had heard for the first time as to worthiness of airplay upon his show, Peel often rated new bands' songs with a series of asterisks, with each song judged upon a scale of one to five asterisks: Peel was so taken by "Teenage Kicks", he awarded the song 28 stars. On one occasion, he is known to have played the song twice in a row, with the explanation given to his audience being, "It doesn't get much better than this."

In a 2001 interview given to The Guardian, Peel stated that apart from his name, the only words he wished to be engraved upon his gravestone were the opening lyrics to "Teenage Kicks", "Teenage dreams so hard to beat".

In February 2008, a headstone engraved with these words was placed on his grave in the Suffolk village of Great Finborough.

In 2004, a mural in tribute to Peel, featuring the opening line of "Teenage Kicks", appeared on a Belfast flyover. (Note: This mural was removed in 2013. Following a public outcry, the mural was reinstated in March 2015.)

=== Documentaries ===
- Teenage Kicks - The Undertones is a 2001 documentary film directed by Tom Collins.
- Here Comes the Summer: The Undertones Story is a 2012 BBC-commissioned documentary focusing upon the Undertones. The documentary was broadcast on BBC Four in September that year. This documentary also features interviews with current and former members of the Undertones (with the exception of Feargal Sharkey) in addition to fans, friends and additional personnel involved in the band's recordings and career.
- The 2013 biographical film Good Vibrations references the Undertones' early career and their initial signing to the Good Vibrations record label. The recording of "Teenage Kicks", the record's championing by John Peel, and the band's subsequent signing to Sire Records is depicted within the film. A scene within the film depicts Peel playing "Teenage Kicks" twice in a row during its first broadcast on 25 September 1978. (Note: While Peel often recounted playing the song twice in a row, some music historians note that the first broadcast audio actually shows him playing it once, though he did break his own rules to play it twice on subsequent occasions due to its popularity.)

=== Other media references ===
In 2008, the song served as the theme song to the ITV sitcom of the same name.

The song Teenage Kicks features prominently in Season 3, Episode 5 of the television series Derry Girls ("The Reunion") which aired in 2022. A cover band plays the song, referring to it as "our national anthem".

== Track listing ==
Side one
No.	Title	Written by	Length
1.	"Teenage Kicks"	J. J. O'Neill	2:26
2.	"True Confessions"	J. J. O'Neill, Michael Bradley, Damian O'Neill	1:53

Side two
No.	Title	Written by	Length
1.	"Smarter Than U"	J. J. O'Neill, Michael Bradley, Billy Doherty	1:36
2.	"Emergency Cases"	J. J. O'Neill	1:56

== Charts ==
Chart (1978)	Peak position
UK (Official Charts Company)	31

Chart (1983)	Peak position
UK (Official Charts Company)	60

Chart (2008)	Peak position
France (SNEP)	76

Chart (2009)	Peak position
France (SNEP)	95

== Certifications ==
Region	Certification	Certified units/sales
United Kingdom (BPI)	Platinum	600,000^{‡}
^{‡} Sales+streaming figures based on certification alone.

== Covers ==
- "Teenage Kicks" was acoustically covered by Snow Patrol in a tribute to John Peel, and was played at his funeral.
- The Swedish rockabilly band The Go Getters included a cover of "Teenage Kicks" on their 2003 album "Motormouth".
- Busted covered "Teenage Kicks" as a B-side for their single "Who's David". It was later featured on a re-issue of their second album A Present for Everyone.
- One Direction covered "Teenage Kicks" (in a medley with Blondie's single "One Way or Another") for the 2013 Comic Relief single "One Way or Another (Teenage Kicks)".
- The Waco Brothers covered "Teenage Kicks" on their 2023 album The Men That God Forgot.
- Nouvelle Vague released a cover of "Teenage Kicks" on their 2004 eponymous debut album.
