= Hypnotised (album) =

Studio album by the Undertones
- Released: 21 April 1980
- Recorded: December 1979 – January 1980
- Studio: Wisseloord Studios, Holland; Eden Studios, London
- Genre: Punk rock, pop punk
- Length: 38:11
- Label: Sire; Rykodisc; Ardeck-EMI; Sanctuary Records (UK CD reissue)
- Producer: Roger Bechirian

The Undertones chronology
The Undertones (1979)	Hypnotised (1980)	Positive Touch (1981)

Hypnotised is a 1980 album released by the Undertones. The album, the second of four released by the band, was recorded at Wisseloord Studios in the Netherlands in December 1979, and at Eden Studios in London in January 1980, with the majority of the songs to appear on the album being written between March and December 1979. In addition, although the primary lyrical concern of the songs upon this album focused upon teenage angst, boisterousness, and heartbreak (as had been the case with their debut album), several of the songs upon Hypnotised are notably both lyrically and musically more sophisticated than material released upon The Undertones.

Produced by Roger Bechirian between December 1979 and January 1980, Hypnotised was released on 21 April 1980, reaching number 6 in the UK Albums Chart and making Hypnotised the highest-charting album of their career.

The original release of Hypnotised included two singles: "My Perfect Cousin", which was released on 28 March 1980 and reached number 9 in the charts; and "Wednesday Week", released on 5 July 1980 and which charted at number 11 three weeks later.

== Cover photography ==
The photograph chosen to adorn the front cover of Hypnotised was taken by Damian O'Neill, and depicts the band's bassist Michael Bradley and drummer Billy Doherty. The image itself was taken at a seafood restaurant in the Bowery, where the band had been taken for a meal by the manager of Sire Records, Seymour Stein, on their first tour of America in September 1979.

== Critical reception ==
Professional ratings
Review scores
Source	Rating
AllMusic	4.5/5 stars
Blender	3/5 stars
Q	4/5 stars
Record Collector	4/5 stars
Record Mirror	4/5 stars
Rolling Stone	4/5 stars
Select	4/5
Smash Hits	9/10
Spin Alternative Record Guide	8/10
The Village Voice	A−

A May 1980 review published in Billboard described the album as "a sprightly collection of 15 short and punchy songs that convey a sense of humor, catchy melodies and lyrics that standout above your average rock fare" and noted that "the vocal intensity gives the songs its streetwise urban kick and the biting guitar riffs cushion the lyrics with the kind of support that calls attention to each song".

In July 1980, an Ira Robbins Trouser Press review stated: "Hypnotised is a wonderful album. [The album contains] clever lyrics and great hooks that make the LP a thoroughly entertaining affair. Their songs are uncomplicated and unpretentious; not aesthetic benchmarks on the state of the world."

Hypnotised was listed in 1001 Albums You Must Hear Before You Die; a poll selected and written by 90 leading international music critics.

== Track listing ==
Side one
No.	Title	Written by	Length
1.	"More Songs About Chocolate and Girls"	Damian O'Neill	2:43
2.	"There Goes Norman"	J. J. O'Neill	2:28
3.	"Hypnotised"	Damian O'Neill, Michael Bradley	2:31
4.	"See That Girl"	J. J. O'Neill	2:25
5.	"Whizz Kids"	Damian O'Neill	2:20
6.	"Under the Boardwalk"	Kenny Young, Arthur Resnick	2:27
7.	"The Way Girls Talk"	J. J. O'Neill	2:30
8.	"Hard Luck"	J. J. O'Neill, Michael Bradley, Damian O'Neill, Billy Doherty, Feargal Sharkey	3:42

Side two
No.	Title	Written by	Length
1.	"My Perfect Cousin"	Damian O'Neill, Michael Bradley	2:36
2.	"Boys Will Be Boys"	J. J. O'Neill, Damian O'Neill	1:27
3.	"Tearproof"	J. J. O'Neill, Michael Bradley	2:21
4.	"Wednesday Week"	J. J. O'Neill	2:17
5.	"Nine Times Out of Ten"	J. J. O'Neill, Billy Doherty	2:38
6.	"Girls That Don't Talk"	J. J. O'Neill	2:27
7.	"What's With Terry?"	Damian O'Neill	3:19

- Sides one and two were combined as tracks 1–15 on CD and download reissues.

Bonus tracks (issued on CD and download releases only)
No.	Title	Written by	Length
16.	"Hard Luck (Again)"	J. J. O'Neill, Michael Bradley, Damian O'Neill, Billy Doherty, Feargal Sharkey	4:11
17.	"I Don't Wanna See (You Again)"	J. J. O'Neill	0:48
18.	"Told You So"	J. J. O'Neill	2:07
19.	"The Positive Touch" (Eden Studios session for John Peel 16/11/1980)	J. J. O'Neill	1:55
20.	"You're Welcome" (Peel session)	J. J. O'Neill	2:11
21.	"When Saturday Comes" (Peel session)	J. J. O'Neill	2:44

== Personnel ==
The Undertones

- Feargal Sharkey - lead vocals
- John O'Neill - guitar, vocals
- Damian O'Neill - guitar, keyboards, vocals
- Michael Bradley - bass, keyboards (on "See That Girl"), vocals
- Billy Doherty - drums

Technical

- Neill King, Peter Bobr - engineer
- Aldo Bocca, Roger Bechirian - mixing on "What's With Terry?"
- Bush Hollyhead, Damian O'Neill, Michael Bradley - sleeve
