= Swords (Irish band) =

Irish band

- Origin: Dublin, Ireland
- Genres: Alternative rock Indie rock
- Years active: 2010–present
- Members: Diane Anglim; Ian Frawley; Jarlath Canning
- Website: http://www.swordsband.com

Swords is a three-piece alternative rock band from Dublin, Ireland, formed in 2010. The band have released two albums to date.

== History ==
The band members are Diane Anglim (vocals, piano, synthesiser); Jarlath Canning (bass, guitar, synthesiser, backing vocals); and Ian Frawley (drums).

Swords released their debut EP, Black Balloon, in February 2012. The four-track EP, produced by Karl Odlum, contained a re-recording of "Chasm" and three new tracks, including the title track, "Black Balloon". "Chasm" was released as a single, with a video created by Sebastian Escalante. The tracks "Chasm" and "Go" featured on the soundtrack of the Ross Noble comedy horror movie "Stitches". The EP was supported by a 25-date Irish tour at venues which included The Roisin Dubh & McCarthys, Dingle, and festivals like The Camden Crawl, Vantastival, and Knockanstockan, and ended with a headline show on The Salty Dog Stage at Electric Picnic.

On 13 November 2012, Swords announced that they were recording an album at a remote house in Kilkenny with producer Karl Odlum. A single, "All The Boys", was released on 26 March 2013, and was featured on national Irish radio. On 4 June 2013, the band performed "The Menace" on the TV show Other Voices.

Their debut album Lions & Gold was released on 5 July 2013 and was launched at Whelan's in Dublin. The band toured Ireland to support the album, with festival slots at The Camden Crawl, Valentia Isle Festival and Indiependence, and performances at Electric Picnic, HWCH 13 in Dublin; and in Dingle. In September 2013, the band announced a publishing deal with UK label Smalltown America Music. The band made another television appearance in The Works on RTE One, followed by a live radio session with Paul McLoone on the national broadcaster Today FM.

In 2016, Swords released the single, "Betty Machete", followed by another single, "The Letter". A third single, "Sixty Thousand Years", was released, featuring a video produced by Bold Puppy.

On 28 October 2016, Swords released Tidal Waves, their second album, which was produced by Karl Odlum and mastered by Mandy Parnell. The album made its debut at Number 1 in the iTunes Charts in Ireland and Number 3 in the full charts. The band said, "We recorded live as much as possible, and tried to let the songs breathe and stand alone without dense production or layers". They played a sold-out headline show at The Workmans Club in Dublin.

== Band members ==
- Diane Anglim – Lead vocals, piano and synthesizer
- Jarlath Canning – Bass guitar, Guitar, backing vocals and synthesizer
- Ian Frawley – Drums

== Discography ==
- Lions & Gold (2013)
- Tidal Waves (2016)
