= My Perfect Cousin =

Single by The Undertones

from the album Hypnotised
- Released: 28 March 1980
- Recorded: December 1979
- Genre: Punk rock
- Length: 2:36
- Label: Sire Records
- Songwriters: Damian O'Neill; Michael Bradley

The Undertones singles chronology
"You've Got My Number (Why Don't You Use It?)" (1979)	"My Perfect Cousin" (1980)	"Wednesday Week" (1980)

Music video
- "My Perfect Cousin" on YouTube

"My Perfect Cousin" is a song by Northern Irish punk rock band the Undertones. The song – inspired by an actual cousin of one of the band members – was written during the summer of 1979 and recorded at Wisseloord Studios in Hilversum in December 1979.

"My Perfect Cousin" was the first of two singles to be released from the band's Hypnotised LP (the second being "Wednesday Week"), and was released on 28 March 1980. The single reached number 9 in both the UK Singles Chart and Irish Singles Chart, making the song the band's only top 10 single.

"My Perfect Cousin" was voted number 30 in the 1980 NME singles of the year poll.

== Background ==
The song was the sixth single released by the Undertones, and the first single to be written by Damian O'Neill and Michael Bradley, the latter of whom would recollect in 1999 that at the time the song was written and developed, he and O'Neill had sensed the song would be released as a single as opposed to an album track.

The music video to the song was largely filmed at the home of the O'Neill brothers, and was directed by Julien Temple. The song was performed on Top of the Pops on two occasions: 10 April and 24 April 1980.

== Sleeve artwork ==
The artwork for the single sleeve depicts a Subbuteo figure in the colours of the band's local football club, Derry City. The lyrics to the song are printed on the rear cover of the sleeve.

== Lyrics ==
The lyrics reference TV quiz show University Challenge, the popular tabletop football game Subbuteo, The Human League (at the time an obscure avant-garde electronic music band), and the synthesiser.

== Track listing ==
Side one
No.	Title	Written by	Length
1.	"My Perfect Cousin"	Damian O'Neill, Michael Bradley	2:36

Side two
No.	Title	Written by	Length
1.	"Hard Luck (Again)"	John O'Neill, Michael Bradley, Damian O'Neill, Feargal Sharkey, Billy Doherty	4:11
2.	"I Don't Wanna See (You Again)"	John O'Neill	0:48
