= You've Got My Number (Why Don't You Use It?) =

Single by The Undertones

from the album Hypnotised (CD Bonus Track)
- Released: 9 October 1979
- Recorded: Summer 1979
- Genre: Punk rock
- Length: 2:38
- Label: Sire Records
- Songwriter: John O'Neill

The Undertones singles chronology
"Here Comes the Summer" (1979)	"You've Got My Number (Why Don't You Use It?)" (1979)	"My Perfect Cousin" (1980)

"You've Got My Number (Why Don't You Use It?)" is a 1979 punk rock song originally written and recorded by Northern Irish band the Undertones. Written in the summer of 1979 by the band's main songwriter, John O'Neill, the single was released on 9 October that year and reached number 32 in the UK charts. The song was performed live on Top of the Pops on 15 November 1979.

"You've Got My Number (Why Don't You Use It?)" was one of only two singles released by the Undertones not to be included on any of their albums at the time of their original release (the other single being "Beautiful Friend"). However, the song was included as a bonus track on the 1994 CD version of the band's second album, Hypnotised, and the 2000 Castle Music re-release of their eponymous debut LP. In addition, the song has been included on several 'Best Of' Undertones compilation albums.

== Background ==
The song was the fifth single released by the Undertones. According to bassist Michael Bradley, when John O'Neill first demonstrated this song to his bandmates, "our jaws dropped to the ground. It was brilliant". The band first played the song live at Oscar's Disco in Derry in the late summer of 1979, prior to its release as a single.

== Sleeve artwork ==
The artwork for the single sleeve depicts the record's Sire catalogue number (4024) in sans-serif font upon the front sleeve. The rear of the sleeve is plain white with a die-cut centre displaying the label of the vinyl single. No text is displayed upon the A-side of the label, which instead depicts a combination of an image of the band members taken by photographer Jill Furmanovsky earlier in 1979.

== Track listing ==
Side one
No.	Title	Written by	Length
1.	"You've Got My Number (Why Don't You Use It?)"	John O'Neill	2:38

Side two
No.	Title	Written by	Length
1.	"Let's Talk About Girls"	Manny Freiser	2:07

- "Let's Talk About Girls" is a cover of a 1967 song by The Chocolate Watch Band, taken from the 1972 Nuggets compilation LP.
