= Rare (Northern Irish band) =

Northern Irish trip hop band

Rare were a Northern Irish trip hop band in the 1990s from Derry. The line-up consisted of singer Mary Gallagher, Locky Morris, Seán Ó'Néill (aka John O'Neill, formerly of The Undertones and That Petrol Emotion) and David Whiteside. Morris and Ó'Néill were the main songwriters. Their music was sometimes labeled as trip hop.

Despite some positive reviews in the music press, their only notable chart appearance was the single "Something Wild" which reached #57 in the UK Singles Chart in 1996. Rare disbanded soon after the release of their first and only album in 1998.

== Discography ==
=== Singles ===
- "Set Me On Fire" (Setanta Records, October 1990)
- "Something Wild" (Equator Records, February 1996)
- "Don't Make Me Wait" (Equator Records, June 1996)
- "Killer" (Arctic/Pinnacle Entertainment Ltd., November 1997)
- "Seems Like" (Arctic/Pinnacle Entertainment Ltd., March 1998)

=== Album ===
- Peoplefreak (Arctic/Pinnacle Entertainment Ltd., April 1998)
