= The Undertones =

Northern Irish punk rock band

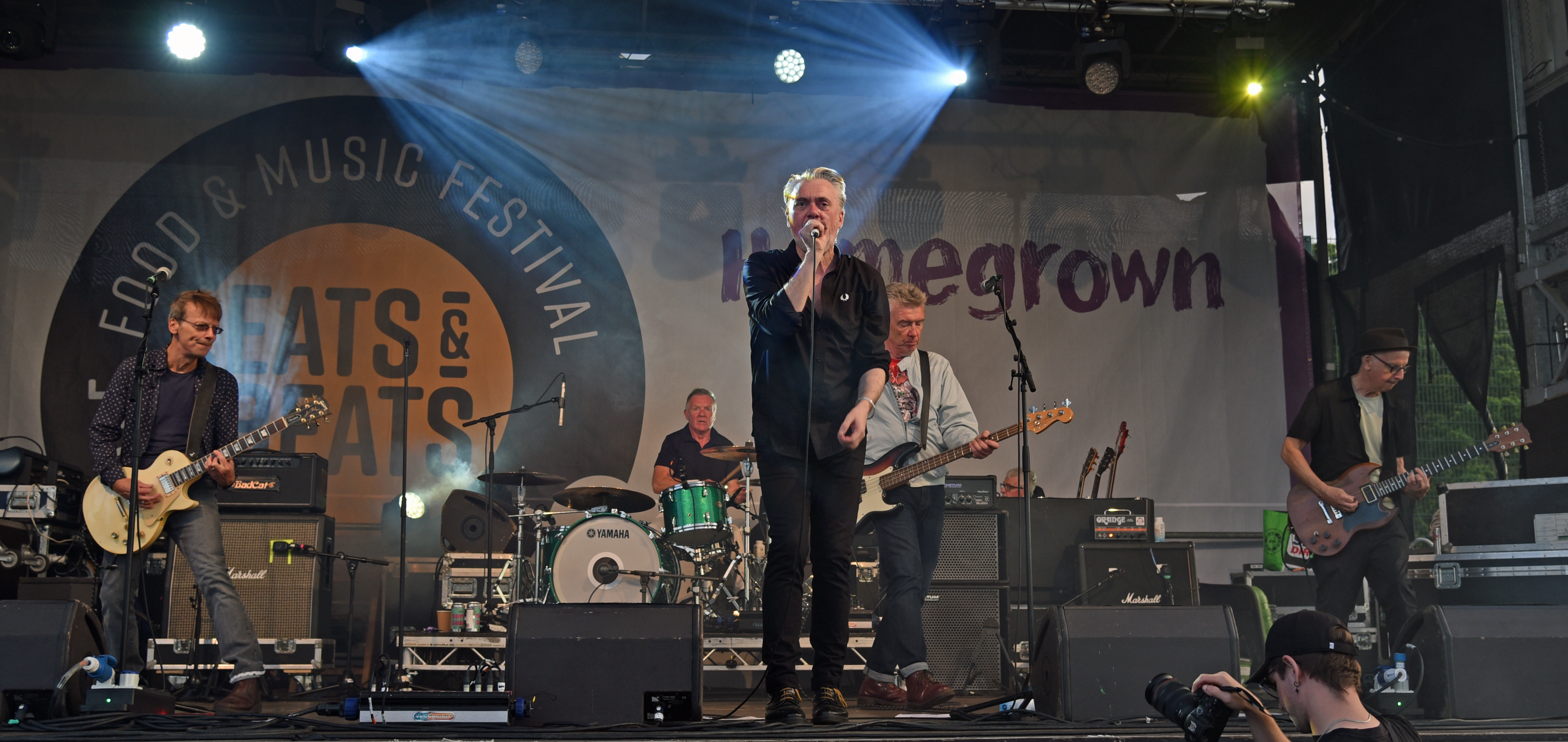
- The Undertones on stage in 2022

Background information
- Origin: Derry, Northern Ireland
- Genres: Punk rock; pop punk; power pop; new wave
- Works: The Undertones discography
- Years active: 1974–1983; 1999–present
- Labels: Good Vibrations; Sire Records; EMI; Sanctuary Records; Cooking Vinyl
- Members: John O'Neill; Michael Bradley; Billy Doherty; Damian O'Neill; Paul McLoone
- Past members: Feargal Sharkey; Vincent O'Neill
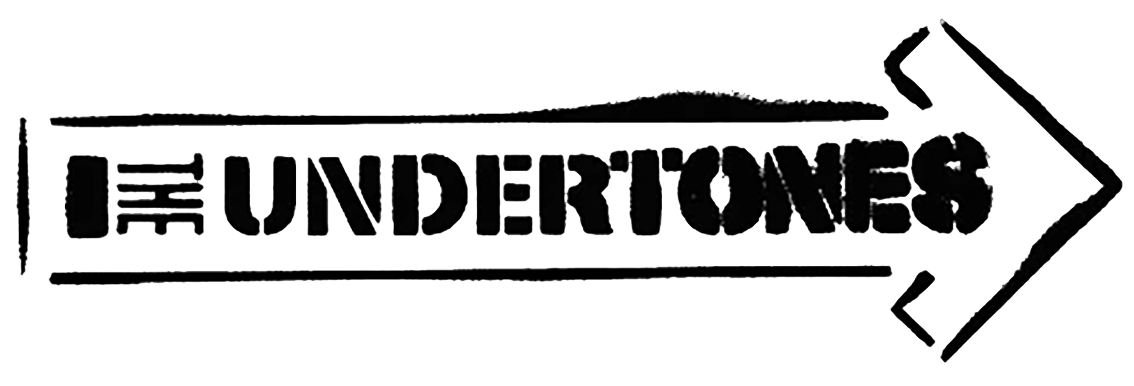
- Website: theundertones.com

The Undertones are a rock band formed in Derry, Northern Ireland in 1974. From 1975 to 1983, the Undertones consisted of Feargal Sharkey (vocals), John O'Neill (rhythm guitar, vocals), Damian O'Neill (lead guitar, vocals), Michael Bradley (bass, vocals) and Billy Doherty (drums). Much of the earlier Undertones material drew influence from punk rock and new wave; the Undertones also incorporated elements of rock, glam rock and post-punk into material released after 1979, before citing soul and Motown as the influence for the material released upon their final album. The Undertones released thirteen singles and four studio albums between 1978 and 1983 before Sharkey announced his intention to leave the band in May 1983, citing musical differences as the reason for the break up.

Despite the backdrop of the Troubles in Derry and across Northern Ireland, the vast majority (though not all) of the material the Undertones released focused not upon the political climate, but upon issues such as adolescence, teenage angst and heartbreak. AllMusic has stated that guitarists John and Damian O'Neill "mated infectious guitar hooks to 1960s garage, 1970s glam rock, and Feargal Sharkey's signature vocal quaver."

In 1999, the Undertones reformed, replacing lead singer Sharkey with Paul McLoone.

The Undertones remain the most successful band to have emerged from Derry, and one of the most successful bands to have emerged from Northern Ireland.

== Formation and early gigs ==
The Undertones formed in Derry, Northern Ireland in 1974. The band members were five friends from Creggan and the Bogside, who originally drew inspiration from such artists as the Beatles, Small Faces and Lindisfarne and who decided in part to form their own band due to both their common interest in music and the fact that—because of the Troubles—many entertainment venues in the city were closed in late evenings.

The band initially rehearsed cover versions at the home of the guitarists, brothers John and Vincent O'Neill, and in the shed of a neighbour. (In early 1976, before the band had played gigs at any venues, Vincent O'Neill left the band; he was soon replaced by his younger brother Damian.)

Beginning in February 1976 the group, at this stage still unnamed, began playing gigs at various minor local venues, including schools, parish halls and Scout huts, where the band's lead singer, Feargal Sharkey, was a local Scout leader. Sharkey was also responsible for giving the band their first name: at the introduction to a gig at Saint Joseph's Secondary School in Derry on 16 March 1976, Feargal Sharkey was asked the name of the band and quickly replied "The Hot Rods". At a later gig, Sharkey named the band "Little Feat": another name already used by another group.

Later that year, drummer Billy Doherty proposed an alternate name for the group: The Undertones, which Doherty had discovered in his school history book. The other members of the band agreed to the proposal.

With the arrival of punk rock in late 1976, the artistic focus of the band changed. Artists such as the Adverts, Sex Pistols, Buzzcocks and, particularly, the Ramones became major influences on the Undertones.

In addition to being a Scout leader, Feargal Sharkey worked as a television repairman and delivery man. The van which Sharkey drove in this employment was used by the Undertones to transport their equipment to and from various venues.

=== The Casbah ===
By 1977 the band were performing their own three-chord pop punk material, which was performed alongside cover versions at concerts, primarily at the Casbah Bar, where the band began to perform in February. (Note: In 1986, Feargal Sharkey would estimate the maximum number of people the band ever played to at the Casbah was approximately 200 people.) The Undertones had occasionally earned money at venues where they had performed throughout 1976, but these gigs at the Casbah were the first performances for which the Undertones were paid on a regular basis, as performing at the Casbah earned the group up to £30 for each attendance fee. (Note: By 1978, the Undertones would also perform live at other musical venues in Derry such as the Rock Club. The collective weekly earnings from these gigs often totalled £60.) Both the money earned and their popularity at this venue inspired the band to write and rehearse further material, as a means of remaining a popular act at the Casbah. By the following year, the concerts the Undertones performed would include the song "Teenage Kicks", which had been written by guitarist John O'Neill in mid-1977. The gigs performed at the Casbah gave the Undertones increased confidence in their musical ability, and in June 1977 they performed concerts outside Derry for the first time, supporting a Dublin punk group named The Radiators from Space.

In March 1978, the Undertones recorded a demo tape at Magee University in Derry and sent copies of the tape to various record companies in the hope of securing a record deal, but only received official letters of rejection. On 15 June 1978, the band recorded their debut four-song EP "Teenage Kicks" on a budget of only £200. The EP was engineered by Davy Shannon at Wizard Studios, Belfast, and was released on Belfast's Good Vibrations record label. (Note: At the time of the recording of this EP, Feargal Sharkey had decided to leave the Undertones. He was persuaded by the remaining members of the band to remain their lead singer until they had at least recorded this EP.) The title song became a hit with support from BBC Radio 1 DJ John Peel, who considered "Teenage Kicks" his all-time favourite song, an opinion he held through to his death in 2004.

== Sire Records ==
Seymour Stein, the president of Sire Records – in London on business – heard John Peel play "Teenage Kicks" on BBC Radio 1 and became interested in the band. Stein sent a London-based representative named Paul McNally to Derry to discuss a record deal with the band. McNally saw the band play live in what would ultimately prove to be their final performance at the Casbah on 29 September 1978. The following day, McNally convened with the Undertones to discuss a record contract. Three members of the band signed the proposed contract on this date, with the understanding that Feargal Sharkey and Michael Bradley would discuss negotiations to the contract with Seymour Stein in person in London.

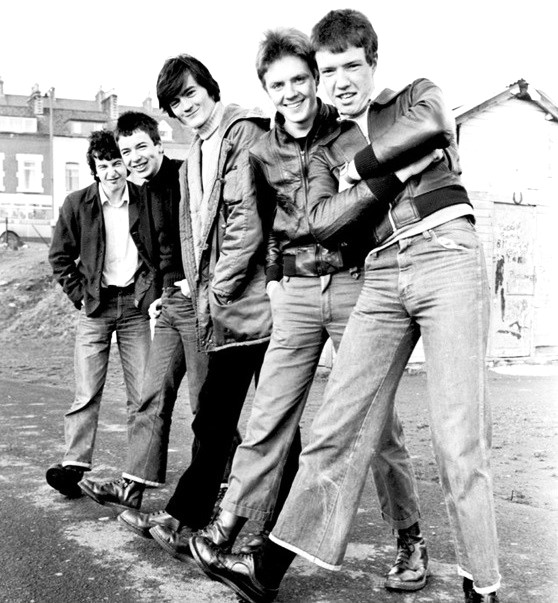
The Undertones, photographed by Derry Journal press photographer Larry Doherty, January 1979

=== "Teenage Kicks" (1978–1979) ===
On 2 October 1978, Bradley and Sharkey agreed to an increased advance fee of £10,000 offered by Stein upon the recording contract and signed to Sire Records on a five-year contract. Sire Records subsequently obtained all rights to the material released upon the Teenage Kicks EP and the song was re-released as a standard vinyl single upon Sire's own label two weeks later.

On 25 October, the Undertones performed "Teenage Kicks" on Top of the Pops. With help from Peel (who had also recorded and broadcast a Peel Session with the Undertones on the 16th), Teenage Kicks peaked at number 31 in the UK Singles Chart the following month.

In November 1978, the Undertones embarked on their first tour of the UK. This tour lasted until 16 December and saw the band appear as the supporting act for The Rezillos and John Otway in England and Wales in addition to headlining in three concerts in Belfast and Derry.

In January 1979, the Undertones recorded their eponymous debut album at Eden Studios in Acton, West London, using producer Roger Bechirian, whom the band had worked with for the first time the previous December, when Bechirian had produced the band's second single, "Get Over You". Much of the material upon their first album had been performed regularly at the Casbah, and the band were able to record this album in the space of less than four weeks.

Following the release of "Get Over You" in February 1979, the Undertones' eponymous debut album was released in May. The primary lyrical concern of the songs focused upon youthful relationships and adolescence. Three further punk singles: "Jimmy Jimmy", "Here Comes the Summer" and "You've Got My Number (Why Don't You Use It?)" were released between April and October 1979, each to critical acclaim. In September 1979, the Undertones toured the United States for the first time, supporting The Clash with eight concerts in six different States.

=== Hypnotised (1980) ===
Following the 'You Got My Number tour' of October 1979, the Undertones began recording the songs for their second album, Hypnotised, at Wisseloord Studios in the Netherlands. The recording of the songs began in December. Ten songs were recorded before the band returned to Derry prior to Christmas to write and record further songs for the album. Three further songs were written during this break: "Tearproof", "More Songs About Chocolate and Girls" and "Wednesday Week".

In January 1980, the production of Hypnotised was finished at Eden Studios in London, with the Undertones recording the three further songs written the previous December, plus two further songs: "Hypnotised" and a cover of "Under The Boardwalk". Following the completion of their second LP, the band embarked upon a two-week tour of Ireland before touring continental Europe for the first time in March.

On 28 March 1980, the Undertones released their sixth single, "My Perfect Cousin". The song, which had been written the previous summer by Damian O'Neill and Michael Bradley, reached number 9 in the UK charts and would subsequently prove to be the band's highest-charting single in the United Kingdom. The following month, on 21 April 1980, the band's second LP, Hypnotised was released. This album reached number 6 in the UK Albums Chart, remaining in the Top 10 for one month. The same week the album was released, the Undertones embarked on their 'Humming tour', which saw the band play a total of 25 gigs across the UK between April and June.

Less than two weeks after the completion of the 'Humming tour', the Undertones toured the United States for the second time, this time as the headlining band. "Wednesday Week"—the second single to be released from Hypnotised—was released in July 1980. This single reached number 11 in the UK chart and remained in the Top 40 for a total of seven weeks.

Between September and December 1980, the Undertones performed two further tours: the 'Disaster Tour (European Style)', which saw the band perform in continental Europe and—in December—the 'See No More' tour of the UK.

In terms of chart sales, the year 1980 was the Undertones' most successful year. A review published in Sounds magazine the same year described the Undertones as: "Possibly the best pop group in the English speaking world."

== EMI ==
=== Positive Touch (1981–1982) ===
In December 1980, the Undertones announced their intention to split from Sire Records as they were unhappy with the lack of promotion they were receiving outside of the UK, particularly in the US. Following negotiations, their manager, Andy Ferguson, succeeded in the band retaining ownership rights to the material released on Sire Records; Ferguson subsequently signed the group to EMI in March 1981.

On 4 January 1981, the band began recording their third album, Positive Touch, again at Wisseloord Studios, and again with Roger Bechirian as producer. The band recorded a total of eight songs in five days before returning to Derry. Later the same month, the band returned to Wisseloord Studios to complete the recording of the LP. The songs on this album indicated a change in both musical and lyrical influences: although the songs remained largely guitar-oriented, the band had written songs which focused upon the Troubles in Northern Ireland such as "Crisis of Mine", "You're Welcome" and the single "It's Going To Happen!", which preceded the release of the LP and was partly inspired by the 1980–81 Hunger Strikes. In addition, several songs upon the LP included instruments such as pianos, saxophones, recorders and brass instruments, with two further songs ("Julie Ocean" and "It's Going To Happen!") drawing musical inspiration from contemporary artists Orange Juice and Dexy's Midnight Runners respectively. The band themselves were content with the change of influences for Positive Touch, which bassist Michael Bradley later described as a "natural progression" for the band, adding that, at the time, consensus between the band members was that the songs upon the LP were their best yet.

One month prior to the release of this third album, in April 1981, the Undertones embarked on their 'Positive Touch tour'; this tour saw the band perform a total of 36 gigs across the UK mainland in the space of less than two months.

Positive Touch was released in May 1981. This third album peaked at number 17 in the UK charts—remaining in the Top 40 for a total of four weeks. The album also received favourable reviews from several music critics and was listed by NME as one of the best albums to be released in 1981, although neither the album nor either of the singles released were as successful as any of the material released the previous year.

Following the conclusion of their 'Positive Touch tour' in June 1981, the Undertones released their second single of 1981, "Julie Ocean". The single – an augmented and extended version of the 106-second album version – was produced by Hugh Jones and Dave Balfe. On 29 September 1981, the Undertones embarked on their biggest tour of continental Europe, which lasted until 20 October 1981 and saw the band perform a total of 19 concerts in six countries.

1982 saw a lull in activity from the Undertones, who only performed live on a total of five occasions throughout the entire year. Two of these gigs were held in England, with three further live appearances held in the United States in August. Much of the time the band spent together was devoted towards writing and recording songs for their next LP in their 8-track demo studio. Damian O'Neill, the Undertones' lead guitarist, later admitted: "We (had) definitely lost a bit of the spark. I don't know but I tend to think some of us got too complacent sitting in our homes in Derry." The Undertones released two studio singles, "Beautiful Friend" and "The Love Parade", in February and October; both of these singles failed to make an impact upon the UK charts.

=== The Sin of Pride (1983) ===
In March 1983, the Undertones released their fourth album, The Sin of Pride. This album, which drew inspiration from both soul and Motown, was produced by Mike Hedges, who had replaced Roger Bechirian as the Undertones' producer following the 1981 release of Positive Touch. Feargal Sharkey is known to have stated he had worked harder upon this album than at any point in his singing career to date, and that he considers this album the finest the Undertones ever produced. The Sin of Pride was met with critical acclaim upon release, and the Undertones performed several gigs in both Scotland and England to promote the release of this album; it reached number 43 in the UK chart. (Note: On the subject of the poor sales of this album, Feargal Sharkey would recollect in 1986: "People still wanted us to rewrite the first album, and we weren't prepared to do that.")

"Certainly the Undertones were a completely different band by the time we made Positive Touch and the last album, The Sin of Pride, which was an even bigger departure. We thought we were doing all these good things, taking up all these challenges and, we felt, meeting them, and nobody was saying a damn thing about it. Everybody wanted us to be these 16-year-old kids covered in acne and playing 'Teenage Kicks'."

— Feargal Sharkey reflecting on the Undertones' final two albums. April 1986

The Undertones released two further studio singles in 1983; their first single, "Got To Have You Back"—an Isley Brothers cover which was inspired by both ABC and Smokey Robinson—was released in February and their second single, "Chain of Love", was released in May. Both failed to make any major impact on the UK chart.

== Disbandment ==
In April 1983, the Undertones embarked on their 'UK Sin of Pride tour' to promote their latest album. By this stage in their career, the band were acutely aware of the pressure they were under from EMI, who were unhappy with the lack of chart success of much of the material the band had released since the release of their Positive Touch LP. In addition, relations between various members of the band, in particular between Feargal Sharkey and John O'Neill, had deteriorated significantly. These factors led to Sharkey announcing his intentions to leave the Undertones during the 'European Tour 1983', which the group performed in May of that year. (Note: Sharkey announced his intentions to leave the Undertones on 16 May.)

To fulfill agreed commitments, the Undertones remained together for a further two months, performing several gigs across continental Europe before disbanding in mid-1983, with their final concert being played at Punchestown Racecourse in County Kildare in Ireland on 17 July.

== Subsequent careers ==
Following the disbandment of the Undertones in 1983, Feargal Sharkey was invited by Vince Clarke and Eric Radcliffe of the synthpop duet The Assembly to provide lead vocals on the single "Never Never", which was released by The Assembly in November 1983 and peaked at number 4 in the UK charts. Sharkey was never officially a member of The Assembly and his vocal contribution to "Never Never" proved to be Sharkey's only recording with the band, who would only issue this one single before folding.

Sharkey subsequently embarked upon a brief, but commercially successful solo career in the mid-1980s to early 1990s.

Two of the other band members, John O'Neill and Damian O'Neill, formed That Petrol Emotion in 1984. That Petrol Emotion released a total of fifteen singles and six albums between 1985 and 1994.

In the 1990s John O'Neill formed a trip hop group called Rare under the stage name Seán Ó'Néill with vocalist Mary Gallagher. They only had one notable chart appearance and disbanded shortly after the release of their only album in 1998.

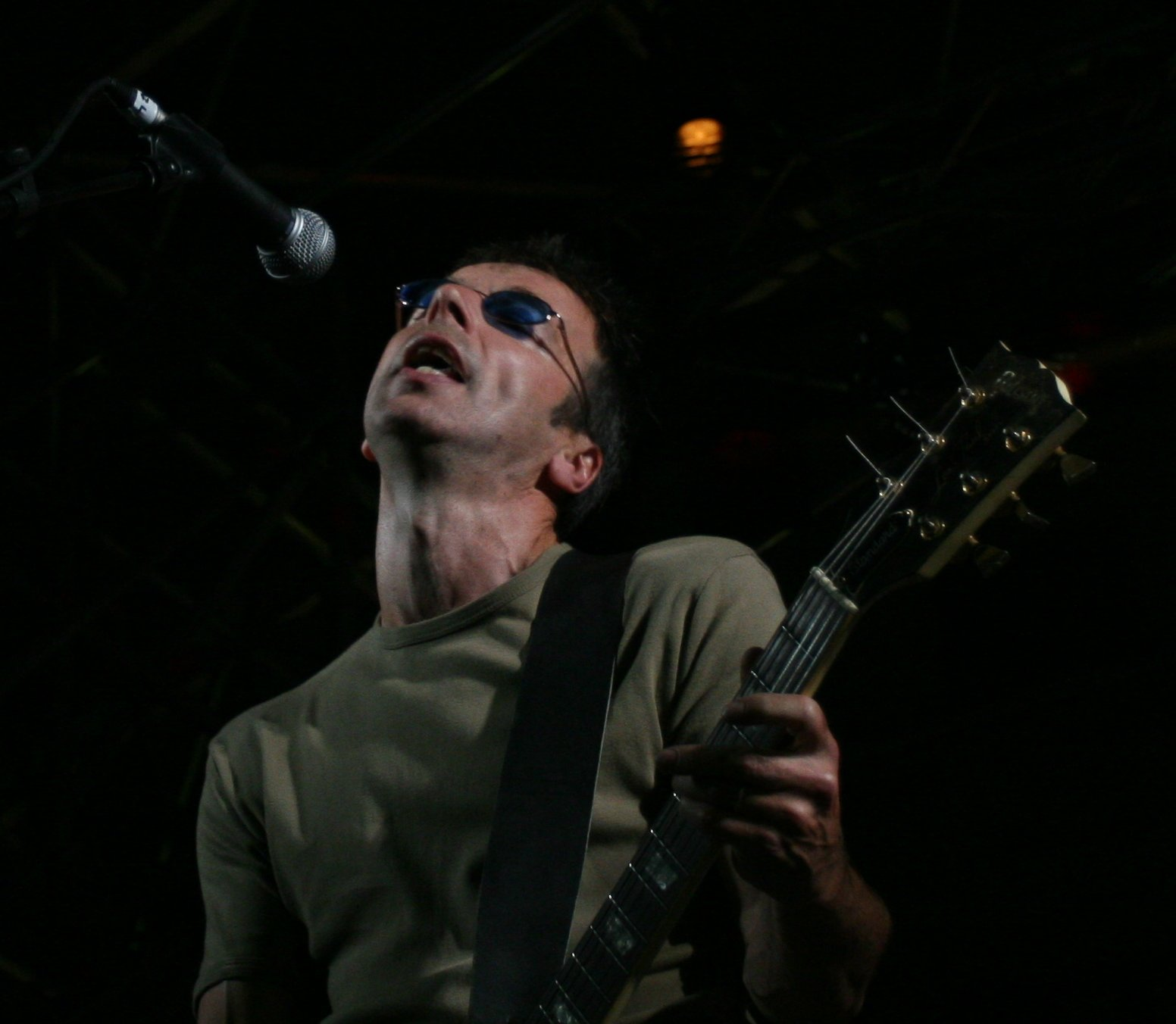
Damian O' Neill on stage with the Undertones in Barcelona, September 2007

== Reunion ==
The Undertones reformed in November 1999, initially to play concerts in Derry. For their reformation, the Undertones replaced Sharkey (who had declined to rejoin the band) with singer Paul McLoone. Since 1999, the Undertones have performed several tours across the UK, Ireland, Continental Europe, Japan, Turkey and North America and continue to perform live.

Noteworthy gigs by the Undertones since their 1999 reformation include performing at the Glastonbury Festival in June 2005 and 2022, providing pre-match entertainment prior to kick-off at Celtic Park in the UEFA Champions League play-off between Celtic and Arsenal in August 2009 and, in March and April 2011, performing a series of UK gigs in which they played their debut album, The Undertones, in its entirety as part of each show. This tour was timed to accompany a re-release of a double compilation album containing all of the A- and B-sides of their singles.

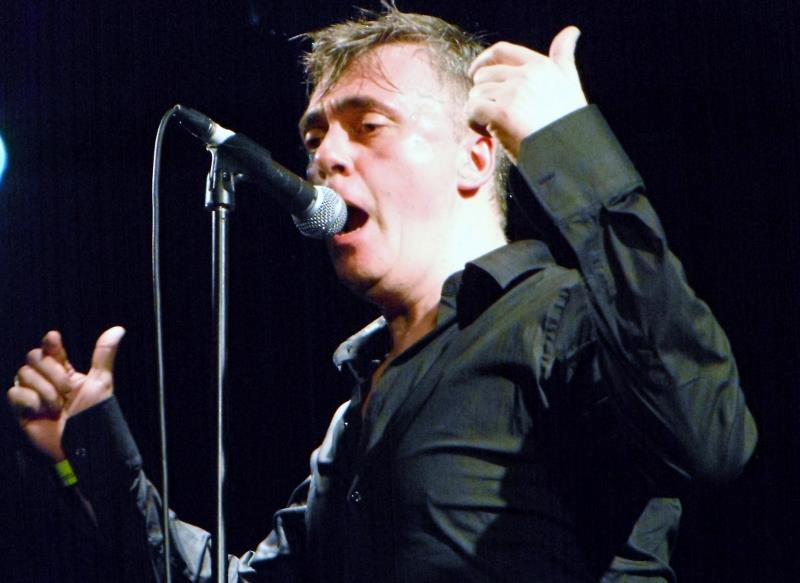
Paul McLoone performing live with the Undertones in Holmfirth, July 2012

Since their reformation, the Undertones have released two albums of original material with Paul McLoone providing vocals: Get What You Need on 30 September 2003; and Dig Yourself Deep, on 15 October 2007.

In April 2013, the Undertones released their first new material for over five years with the double A-side single "Much Too Late / When It Hurts I Count To Ten". This single—limited to 1,000 numbered copies—was released as part of the Record Store Day promotion in the UK and was recorded at Toe Rag Studios in London.

== Media recognition ==
In a 2000 poll by Q to discover the 100 greatest British albums of all time as voted by the British public, the Undertones' eponymous debut LP was voted the 90th greatest British album.

The Undertones have also been the subject of two documentaries: The first documentary to be produced: The Story of the Undertones: Teenage Kicks, was recorded in 2001 and released in 2004. Directed by Tom Collins, this 65-minute documentary was produced with the cooperation of John Peel, who interviews all current and former members of the band (with the exception of Vincent O'Neill) in addition to Seymour Stein and Eamonn McCann. In this documentary, the band discuss their formation, career, subsequent careers, personal lives and 1999 reunion.

The second documentary relating to The Undertones: Here Comes the Summer: The Undertones Story, was commissioned by the BBC and broadcast on BBC Four in September 2012. This documentary also features with interviews with current and former members of the Undertones (excluding Feargal Sharkey) in addition to numerous fans, friends, journalists, and additional personnel involved in the band's recordings and career.

The band were also portrayed in the 2013 film Good Vibrations about Terri Hooley and the Good Vibrations record label, featuring Jodie Whittaker and Richard Dormer.

== Members ==
Current members

- John O'Neill – rhythm guitar, backing vocals (1975–1983, 1999–present)
- Michael Bradley – bass guitar, keyboards, backing vocals (1975–1983, 1999–present)
- Billy Doherty – drums (1975–1983, 1999–present)
- Damian O'Neill – lead guitar, keyboards, backing vocals (1976–1983, 1999–present)
- Paul McLoone – lead vocals (1999–present)

Former members

- Feargal Sharkey – lead vocals (1975–1983)
- Vincent O'Neill – lead guitar (1975–1976)

== Discography ==
- The Undertones (1979)
- Hypnotised (1980)
- Positive Touch (1981)
- The Sin of Pride (1983)
- Get What You Need (2003)
- Dig Yourself Deep (2007)
