= The Undertones (album) =

Studio album by the Undertones
- Released: 6 May 1979
- Recorded: 22 January – 14 February 1979
- Studio: Eden Studios, London; Mrs. Simms Shed, 23 Creggan Street, Derry ("Casbah Rock" 1977)
- Genre: Punk rock, pop punk
- Length: 29:29
- Label: Sire
- Producer: Roger Bechirian

The Undertones chronology
The Undertones (1979)	Hypnotised (1980)

Alternative cover
- October 1979 re-release

The Undertones is the 1979 debut album by the Undertones. The album was recorded at Eden Studios in Acton, West London in January 1979 and was released in May that year. The original release included just one single release: "Jimmy Jimmy" and an album version of "Here Comes the Summer", which was never released as a single.

A re-released version of the album (housed in an alternate sleeve), was issued in October 1979. The re-released album also included the Undertones' first two singles: "Teenage Kicks" and "Get Over You" alongside both "Jimmy Jimmy" and a single version of "Here Comes the Summer", which had been released in July. In addition, the song "Casbah Rock" was included as the final track on both releases of the album.

== Recording ==
The Undertones' eponymous debut album was recorded at Eden Studios in January 1979. The album was produced by Roger Bechirian, with whom the band had worked for the first time the previous month, when Bechirian had produced the band's second single, "Get Over You". Much of the material on this album had been performed at the Casbah, a venue in Derry where the band had regularly performed since 1977, with some songs having only been written towards the end of 1978. The album itself was recorded in the space of less than four weeks, with mixing concluding on 14 February. (Note: The Undertones would record their second Peel Session with John Peel while in London to record their debut album. This second recording of a Peel Session for the band—which saw them perform four songs from this forthcoming LP—was broadcast on BBC Radio on 5 February, and was recorded at Maida Vale Studios.)

== Cover photography ==
The photographs of the band which adorn the front and rear cover of the initial release of The Undertones were taken in Bull Park, Derry, in late January 1979 following the completion of the Eden Studios recording sessions of the LP. The photography was taken by Derry Journal photographer Larry Doherty. The band themselves insisted on the photography being black and white, with them depicted sitting on a wall in Derry, as the band wished to replicate the cover photography of the Ramones' first album—albeit only to a degree.

The front and rear cover photography of the re-released version of the album was taken by Jill Furmanovsky. The band's skyward-looking pose on the front cover of this version was inspired by the artwork of another debut album, The Who's My Generation.

== Critical reception ==
Professional ratings
Review scores
Source	Rating
AllMusic	4.5/5 stars
Blender	4/5 stars
Christgau's Record Guide	B+
Mojo	4/5 stars
Q	5/5 stars
Record Collector	4/5 stars
Rolling Stone	3.5/5 stars
Select	5/5
Sounds	5/5 stars
Spin Alternative Record Guide	9/10

According to lead guitarist Damian O'Neill, although delighted with the critical reception of their debut album, the band were unprepared for the wave of appraisal from music journalists such as Paul Morley. In 2000, O'Neill recollected their debut album as being the best they released, stating the album "summed us up. It still sounds fresh. No, I don't think we should have split up at that point."

In 2019, O'Neill also reflected: "I think it took about a month altogether: a couple of weeks recording, and then mixing. The drums and bass are mostly live, I would say, then we probably would have redone the guitars. If anything was good then we left it. We didn't have to rearrange anything. The exuberance, the excitement, we were all still teenagers, more or less: I'd just turned 18 in January '79. There's a youthfulness for that album alone. I think, by the next album, Hypnotised, we'd kind of grown up a little bit more. It's probably my favourite record still, the first album, because it's got that freshness, which is wonderful."

=== Contemporary reviews ===
In May 1979, Paul Morley of NME proclaimed that the group "make the great, elusive, valuable new pop of our time, along with Blondie, Elvis Costello, the Ramones and Buzzcocks. Each song makes its point and then ceases. [The] rhythm guitar sets up a staggered change of lucid authority, lead guitar offsets with deft and versatile detail, the rhythm seamlessly steers, the juicy harmonies soar and counterpoint, and the consummate, matter-of-fact genius phrasing of warbling singer Feargal Sharkey conclusively makes each song perfect and breathtaking."

Harry Doherty of Melody Maker declared the album to be "an album that is as disposable as it is essential, depending on the mood of the moment. Not an album to discard carelessly, but one to leave on permanent stand-by." Doherty also references "hooks [that] are hypnotic" and declared "True Confessions" as the album's most fascinating track."

Dave McCullough of Sounds declared the Undertones as a "wee band of pure, straight ahead magic", stating the album was "real-life depicted by real people with stunning precision. It's the Undertones' quite remarkable panache for using all the clipped songspace to elastic proportions, bulging and burgeoning the strict, fruitfully disciplined allocation to produce fire and brimstone rock and roll thunder."

A review of the album by Robert Christgau in his 1981 music reference book Christgau's Record Guide: Rock Albums of the Seventies states: "Nice lads, nice lads—suddenly the world is teeming with nice lads. I like their punky speed and adolescent authenticity, but I'd prefer the reverse—among adolescents these days the speed takes care of itself, while finding something besides teendom to write about is a problem."

=== Accolades ===
Numerous polls conducted since 1979 have placed The Undertones as one of the greatest albums to be released in the 1970s and one of the Top 40 punk/new wave albums of all time, with the single "Teenage Kicks" being listed by BBC Radio 2 as the 51st best song ever released.

- A 1979 end of year critics' list published by Melody Maker placed The Undertones as the sixth best album to be released that year.
- The album was ranked at No. 17 among the top "Albums of the Year" for 1979 by NME, with "Get Over You" ranked at No. 32 among the year's top tracks. A 1993 poll by NME placed The Undertones as the 50th greatest album to be released in the 1970s.
- In a 2000 poll conducted by Q magazine, to find the '100 Greatest British Albums Ever' as voted by the British public, the Undertones' eponymous debut LP was voted the 90th greatest album ever written by British artists.
- A 2006 poll by UK-based rock music magazine Kerrang! lists The Undertones as the 19th greatest punk album ever to be released.
- The Undertones' debut LP was also listed in "1001 Albums You Must Hear Before You Die:" a poll selected and written by 90 leading international music critics.

== Track listing ==
=== Original May 1979 release ===
Side one
No.	Title	Written by	Length
1.	"Family Entertainment"	Damian O'Neill	2:37
2.	"Girls Don't Like It"	J. J. O'Neill	2:19
3.	"Male Model"	J. J. O'Neill, Michael Bradley, Damian O'Neill	1:54
4.	"I Gotta Getta"	J. J. O'Neill	1:53
5.	"Wrong Way"	Billy Doherty	1:23
6.	"Jump Boys"	J. J. O'Neill	2:40
7.	"Here Comes The Summer"	J. J. O'Neill	1:42

Side two
No.	Title	Written by	Length
1.	"Billy's Third"	Billy Doherty	1:57
2.	"Jimmy Jimmy"	J. J. O'Neill	2:41
3.	"True Confessions"	J. J. O'Neill, Michael Bradley, Damian O'Neill	1:52
4.	"(She's A) Runaround"	J. J. O'Neill	1:49
5.	"I Know a Girl"	J. J. O'Neill, Michael Bradley, Damian O'Neill	2:35
6.	"Listening In"	J. J. O'Neill, Michael Bradley, Damian O'Neill	2:24
7.	"Casbah Rock"	J. J. O'Neill	0:47

- Sides one and two were combined as tracks 1–14 on CD and download reissues.

=== October 1979 reissue ===
Side one
No.	Title	Written by	Length
1.	"Family Entertainment"	Damian O'Neill	2:37
2.	"Girls Don't Like It"	J. J. O'Neill	2:19
3.	"Male Model"	J. J. O'Neill, Michael Bradley, Damian O'Neill	1:54
4.	"I Gotta Getta"	J. J. O'Neill	1:53
5.	"Teenage Kicks"	J. J. O'Neill	2:28
6.	"Wrong Way"	Billy Doherty	1:23
7.	"Jump Boys"	J. J. O'Neill	2:40
8.	"Here Comes The Summer"	J. J. O'Neill	1:45

Side two
No.	Title	Written by	Length
1.	"Get Over You"	J. J. O'Neill	2:46
2.	"Billy's Third"	Billy Doherty	1:57
3.	"Jimmy Jimmy"	J. J. O'Neill	2:41
4.	"True Confessions"	J. J. O'Neill, Michael Bradley, Damian O'Neill	1:52
5.	"(She's A) Runaround"	J. J. O'Neill	1:49
6.	"I Know a Girl"	J. J. O'Neill, Michael Bradley, Damian O'Neill	2:35
7.	"Listening In"	J. J. O'Neill, Michael Bradley, Damian O'Neill	2:24
8.	"Casbah Rock"	J. J. O'Neill	0:47

Bonus tracks (issued on CD and download releases only)
No.	Title	Written by	Length
15.	"Teenage Kicks"	J. J. O'Neill	2:28
16.	"True Confessions" (single version)	J. J. O'Neill, Michael Bradley, Damian O'Neill	1:56
17.	"Emergency Cases"	J. J. O'Neill	1:59
18.	"Smarter Than You"	Damian O'Neill, Michael Bradley, Billy Doherty	1:38
19.	"Get Over You"	J. J. O'Neill	2:46
20.	"Really Really"	Billy Doherty	1:52
21.	"She Can Only Say No"	J. J. O'Neill	0:54
22.	"Here Comes The Summer" (single version)	J. J. O'Neill	1:46
23.	"One Way Love"	J. J. O'Neill	2:16
24.	"Top Twenty"	J. J. O'Neill	2:14
25.	"Mars Bars"	Damian O'Neill, Michael Bradley	2:10
26.	"You've Got My Number (Why Don't You Use It?)"	J. J. O'Neill	2:41
27.	"Let's Talk About Girls"	Manny Freiser	3:40
28.	"Top Twenty" (Peel session)	J. J. O'Neill	2:03
29.	"Nine Times Out of Ten" (Peel session)	J. J. O'Neill, Billy Doherty	2:33
30.	"The Way Girls Talk" (Peel session)	J. J. O'Neill	2:40
31.	"Whizz Kids" (Peel session)	Damian O'Neill	2:23

Notes

- "Let's Talk About Girls" is a cover of a 1966 song by The Grodes.

== Personnel ==
The Undertones

- Feargal Sharkey – lead vocals
- John O'Neill – rhythm guitar, backing vocals
- Damian O'Neill – lead guitar, keyboard, backing vocals
- Michael Bradley – bass guitar, lead vocals (on original album version of "True Confessions"), backing vocals
- Billy Doherty – drums
