= Baby Shakes =

American rock band

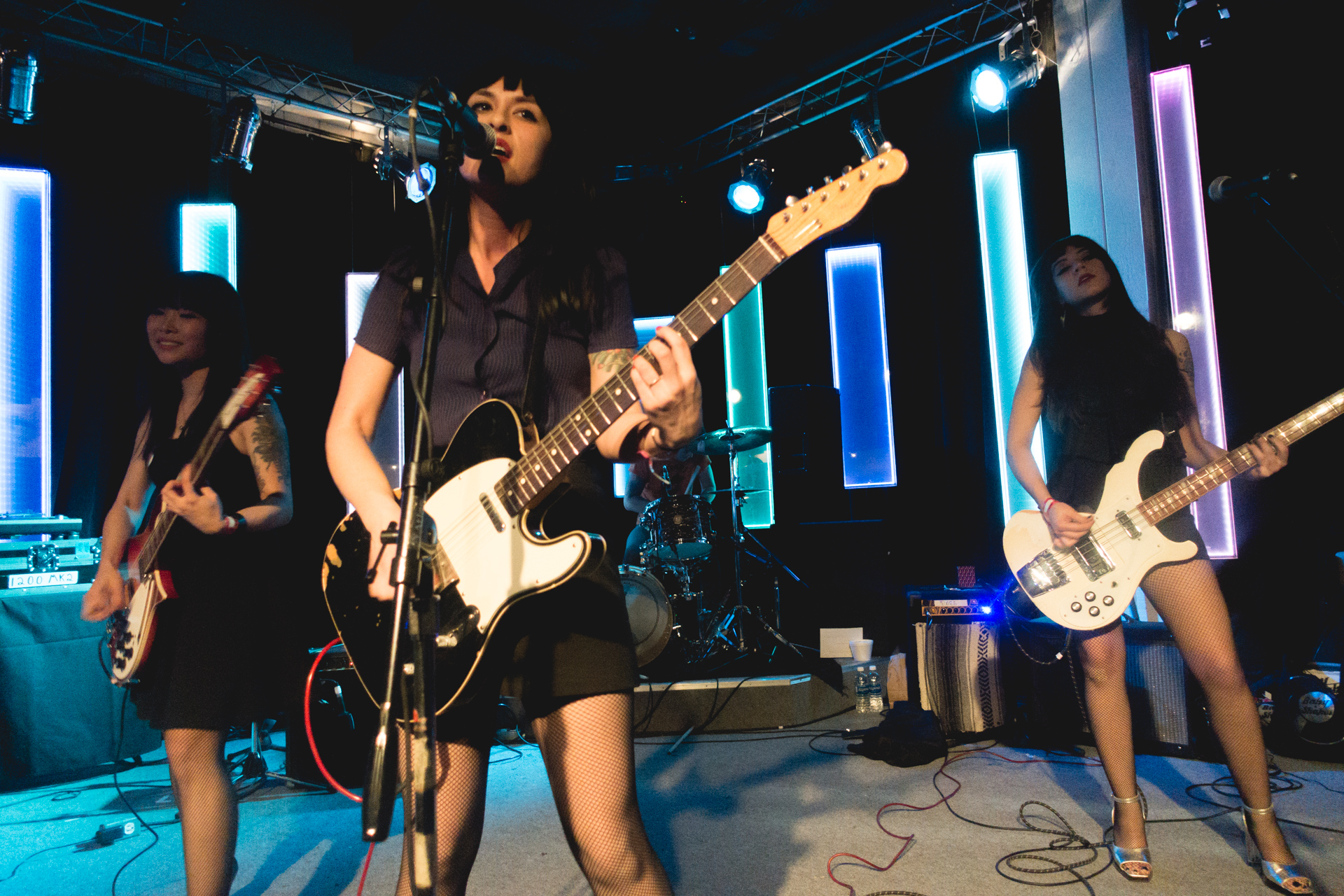

Background information
- Origin: New York City, USA
- Genres: Rock, power pop, punk
- Years active: 2005-present
- Labels: Douchemaster Records, Lil' Chewy Records, Dimple Discs
- Members: Mary Blount; Judy Lindsay; Claudia Gonzalez; Ryan McHale
- Past members: Dave Rahn
- Website: http://www.babyshakes.com

Baby Shakes is an American rock band from New York City. They define their music as rock 'n' roll, power pop, punk, and glam rock.

== History ==
Baby Shakes were founded 2005 in New York City by Mary Blount, Judy Lindsay and Claudia Gonzalez. They first performed as a group in February 2005. They have toured the U.S., U.K., Europe (September 2007, November 2009, September 2015, July 2016, October 2016, Fall 2017), China (July 2016) and Japan (February 2009, February 2016, March 2017). Baby Shakes released their second full-length album, Starry Eyes, in August 2015 and released their third full-length album, Turn It Up, in May 2017.

Their current and permanent drummer (since 2015) is Ryan McHale (New York), and their former drummer was Dave Rahn from Atlanta (Gentleman Jesse & His Men, Carbons) who also played the drums on all Baby Shakes recordings prior to 2016. Their drummer during their February 2009 Japanese tour was Travis Ramin (Nikki Corvette, Fevers) and Shingo Nishimaru was their drummer during their 2009 European tour.

Bio taken from www.babyshakes.com:

Baby Shakes are a rock n' roll-punk band from New York City. Mary on lead vocals and guitar, Judy on lead guitar and vocals, Claudia on bass and vocals, and Ryan on drums. With catchy melodic vocals over dirty guitars and a killer rhythm section, their influences range from The Ramones and Slade to Chuck Berry and 60's Motown girl groups. Formed in 2005, they've released 5 singles, a 10" heart-shaped EP, a singles collection, and 3 full-length albums. They have toured the US, Japan, China, Ireland, UK and Europe. Baby Shakes have shared the stage with The Romantics, The Boys, Iggy Pop, Shadows of Knight, The Undertones (with the band's Damian O'Neill issuing some of their songs via his Dimple Discs label), Barracudas, Protex, Guitar Wolf, Black Lips, Paul Collin's Beat, among others.

== Band members ==
Current members

- Mary Blount – lead vocals, rhythm guitar (2005–present)
- Judy Lindsay – lead guitar, vocals (2005–present)
- Claudia Gonzalez – bass, vocals (2005–present)
- Ryan McHale – drums (2015–present)

Former members

- Dave Rahn – drums (2005-2015)

Touring members

- Travis Ramin – drums (2009)
- Shingo Nishimaru – drums (2009)

== Discography ==
=== Studio albums ===
- The First One (2008; Douchemaster Records)
- Starry Eyes (2015; self-published/Chewy Records, Ltd. CD on Japanese label Base Records)
- Turn It Up (2017; LP/CD self-published/Chewy Records, cassette on Burger Records, Ltd. CD on Base Records)
- Cause A Scene (2019; LP/CD self published, CD on Base Records)

=== EP ===
- Tell Me Now (2007; Rob's House Records), heart-shaped red vinyl

=== Singles ===
- Shake Shake (2006; Douchemaster Records)
- Stuck on Blue (2006; Shit Sandwich Records)
- With You Around/Too Much Time (2009, self-published/Chewy Records)
- She's a Star/Gimme Your Love (2015; split label release from Surfin' Ki (Italy) and Record Shop Base (Japan))
- Turn It Up/Lonely Nights (2017; split label release from Surfin' Ki (Italy) and Record Shop Base (Japan))

=== Compilation album ===
- Singles Collection (2012; mixed labels), digital release on iTunes

== Reception ==
Mark Deming of AllMusic in his review of The First One referred to the group as "three good-looking gals who can write great pop tunes with a dash of punk rock energy and girl group harmonies to boot" he goes on to call their songs "as refreshing as a tall glass of lemonade on a hot day". Deming does lament that "the production by Dave Rahn...could use a bit more body" but goes on to conclude "the music's good enough that you can play the album two or three times in a row without it wearing out its welcome". J. Edward Keyes of Rolling Stone refers to the group as "the new sound of old punk".
