= It's Going to Happen! =

Single by The Undertones

from the album Positive Touch
- Released: 21 April 1981
- Recorded: January 1981
- Genre: New wave
- Length: 3:30
- Label: Ardeck-EMI
- Songwriters: Damian O'Neill; Michael Bradley

The Undertones singles chronology
"Wednesday Week" (1980)	"It's Going to Happen!" (1981)	"Julie Ocean" (1981)

Rear cover
- Rear cover of single, depicting the Undertones in 1981

Music video
- "It's Going to Happen!" on YouTube

"It's Going to Happen!" is a new wave song originally written and recorded by Northern Irish band the Undertones. The song was written in the winter of 1980 and recorded at Wisseloord Studios in the Netherlands in January, 1981. "It's Going to Happen!" was the eighth single released by the band and the second single released to be co-written by lead guitarist Damian O'Neill and bassist Michael Bradley.

Lyrically, the song was unlike any of the previous singles released by the Undertones, the majority of which focused on teenage angst and romance. In contrast, "It's Going to Happen!" was partly written in reference to the 1981 hunger strikes in Northern Ireland. The single is notable for its inclusion of brass instruments in the recording.

The song was selected by EMI to be released as a single before the Undertones' 3rd LP Positive Touch and was released on 21 April 1981, two weeks before the release of Positive Touch. The single reached number 18 in the UK Singles Chart on 24 May, and number 10 in the Irish Singles Chart.

== Sleeve artwork ==
The artwork for the single sleeve was designed by Bush Hollyhead. The front of the sleeve depicts an image representing a tightrope walker beginning to fall to the ground; the image on the rear of the sleeve depicts the band standing before a backdrop of icons representing each of the songs on their album Positive Touch. This particular photograph was taken by Mervyn Franklin.

== Top of the Pops ==
"It's Going to Happen!" was performed on Top of the Pops on 7 May 1981, shortly after one of the hunger strikers, Bobby Sands, died. To mark his death, Damian O'Neill performed the song on Top of the Pops wearing a black armband. The Undertones also performed the song on the 21 May 1981 edition of Top of the Pops.

== Track listing ==
Side one
No.	Title	Written by	Length
1.	"It's Going to Happen!"	Damian O'Neill, Michael Bradley	3:39

Side two
No.	Title	Written by	Length
1.	"Fairly in the Money Now"	Tommy Tate & The Torpedoes	2:34

- Tommy Tate & The Torpedoes was a pseudonym used by Damian O'Neill.
