= Wednesday Week =

Single by The Undertones

from the album Hypnotised
- Released: 5 July 1980
- Recorded: January 1980
- Genre: Pop; new wave
- Length: 2:16
- Label: Sire Records
- Songwriter(s): John O' Neill

The Undertones singles chronology
"My Perfect Cousin" (1980)	"Wednesday Week" (1980)	"It's Going To Happen!" (1981)

Alternative cover

Music video
- "Wednesday Week" on YouTube

"Wednesday Week" is the seventh single released by the Undertones. The song was written in December 1979 by the band's rhythm guitarist and principal songwriter, John O' Neill, during a Christmas break the band had taken while recording their second album, Hypnotised. The song was notably more mellow than each of the six singles the band had released previously, drawing influences from mid-sixties acts such as the Kinks and the Beatles as opposed to punk rock acts such as the Ramones.

The single was released on 5 July 1980 and peaked at #11 on the UK Singles Chart three weeks later, making the song the band's second highest charting single.

Wednesday Week was the Undertones' final single to be released on the Sire label before the band left the label in December 1980. The Undertones subsequently signed a contract with EMI in March 1981.

== Track listing ==
Side one
No.	Title	Written by	Length
1.	"Wednesday Week"	John O'Neill	2:16

Side two
No.	Title	Written by	Length
1.	"I Told You So"	John O'Neill	2:07
