= Paul McLoone =

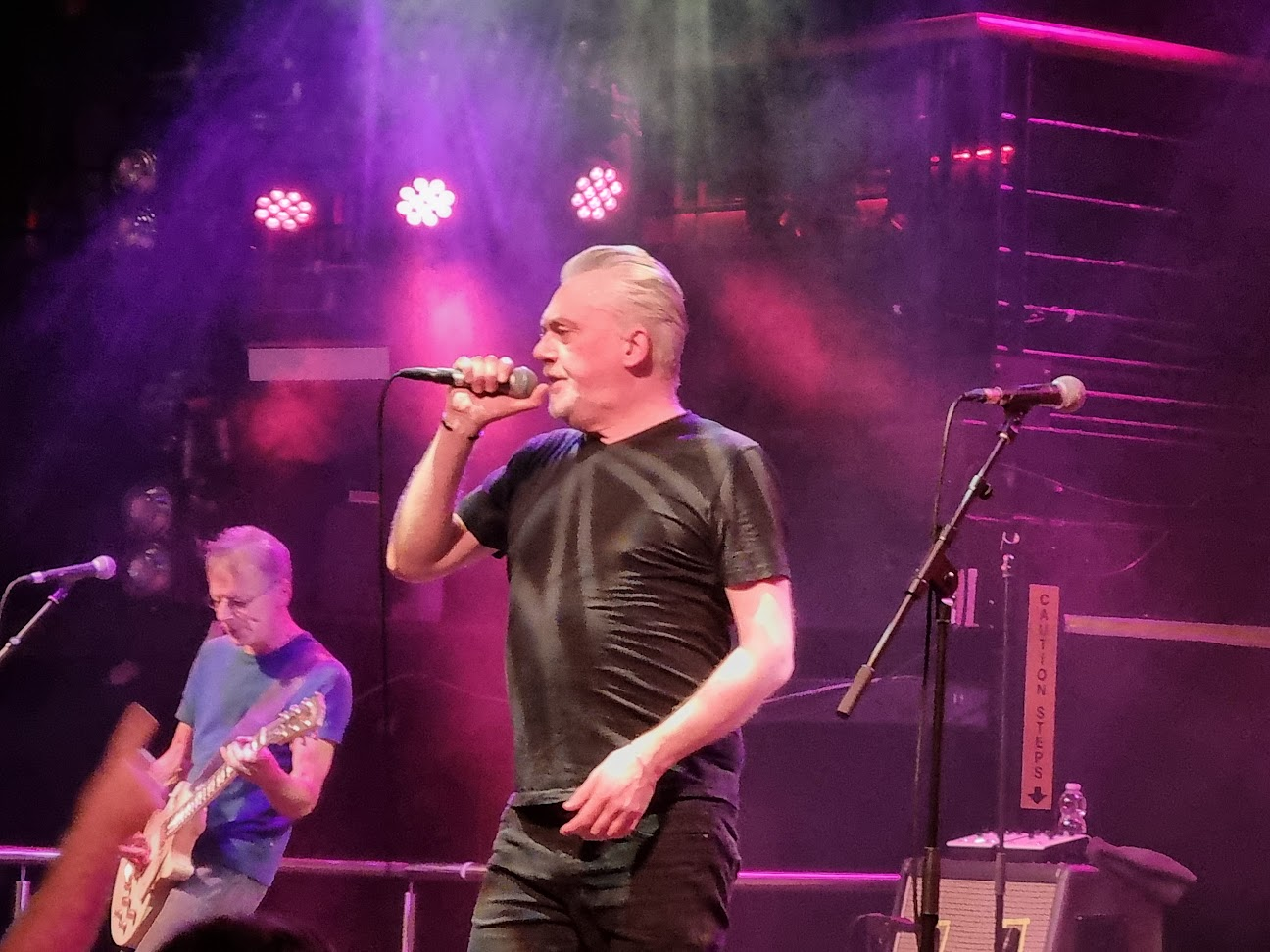
- Paul McLoone performing on stage with The Undertones in Dublin, Ireland, on 26 November 2023

Background information
- Born: Paul Martin McLoone; 11 February 1967 (age 58); Derry, Northern Ireland
- Genres: Punk rock; pop punk
- Occupations: Musician; radio producer; voice actor; radio presenter
- Instruments: Vocals; acoustic guitar
- Years active: 1985–present
- Labels: Cooking Vinyl
- Member of: The Undertones

Paul Martin McLoone (born 11 February 1967) is a Northern Irish musician, former radio producer, voice actor, voice-over artist and radio presenter from Derry, Northern Ireland. He is perhaps best known for being the co-creator and co-writer of the Irish comedy sketch series Gift Grub. He is also the lead vocalist/frontman of the Northern Irish pop-punk/new-wave band the Undertones, permanently replacing Feargal Sharkey when the band reunited for a series of live appearances in November 1999. From September 2008 to June 10, 2021, he hosted the weekday evening/night-time radio programme on the Irish national and independent radio station, Today FM titled The Paul McLoone Show which broadcast from Dublin every Monday to Thursday from 10:00pm to midnight. It focused on less-known Irish solo singers or bands, as well as those from other countries who are popular in the alternative and indie rock world, but who have yet to crack the mainstream line of the music industry.

McLoone also hosted a radio programme titled Another Side on TXFM (formerly Phantom FM), a sister station to Today FM that broadcasts to Dublin City and its surrounding areas. The programme, which aired from 17 January 2015 to 2 July 2016, was dedicated to giving an in-depth profile of a single major musician or band by playing various songs associated with the band or the musician's career, including ones that may not have been released as singles. The show aired for one hour at 6:00 pm to 7:00 pm every Saturday on TXFM and was repeated every Sunday night from 10:00 pm to 11:00 pm with fellow radio presenter John Caddell.

From March 2012 to March 2016, McLoone served as the main presenter for the main awards ceremony of the Choice Music Prize, an annual awards ceremony in Dublin every year; it began in 2005 with the Choice Music Prize awarded to a band or musician from Ireland whose album is deemed worthy of the prize by a panel of judges composed of various people from all aspects of Irish media. McLoone was originally involved in the background running of the awards before making his debut as M.C. at the 2011 prize ceremony, a role he held for five years until the Choice Music Prize started broadcast on RTÉ 2FM from 2017 onwards.

== Career ==
=== Radio ===
Growing up in Derry's Bogside, McLoone began his radio career in the late 1980s. He first appeared on Gerry Anderson's show on BBC Radio Foyle in 1985. While on the show, McLoone successfully impersonated Prince Charles in a radio interview with Anderson which, in turn, launched McLoone's own career in radio with Anderson also serving as McLoone's radio mentor.

In the late-eighties, McLoone served as frontman, guitarist and lead singer in the Carrellines with future bandmate in the Undertones, drummer Billy Doherty. Despite gaining praise from the Irish media, the Carrellines broke up after releasing two singles, "Bridesmaids Never Brides" and its b-side "Credence". After that, McLoone managed another band, Schtum, which disbanded while the group was touring America.

As such, McLoone eventually became a radio producer and was later involved in producing various programmes for the BBC, including his own satirical sketch series McLoone which ran for three series in the early 1990s on BBC Radio Foyle.

In March 1999, McLoone moved to Dublin in the Republic of Ireland. He later joined the national independent radio station, Today FM, originally called Radio Ireland before its relaunch in 1998. He subsequently became a producer on The Ian Dempsey Breakfast Show, for Today FM. During his time on The Ian Dempsey Breakfast Show, McLoone produced the show and also co-created and co-wrote the comedy Irish sketch series, Gift Grub, alongside Irish comedian/impersonator, Mario Rosenstock. The pair also participated in sketches either together or separately. In 2004, after five years on The Ian Breakfast Show, McLoone resigned from Today FM.

The next years, McLoone went freelance, working with various TV/radio stations where he produced numerous programmes, including for the Irish national broadcaster, RTÉ. McLoone also worked on its two popular radio stations, RTÉ Radio 1 and RTÉ 2fm, including the RTÉ Radio 1 daytime radio program, Liveline.

In late 2005/early 2006, Tom Dunne, frontman of the Irish band Something Happens, asked McLoone to produce his own music show on Today FM, Pet Sounds.

After hosting Pet Sounds for nine years, Dunne left Today FM in August 2008 to join national independent radio station Newstalk. McLoone switched to radio presenting. At first, his role was intended to last for three months until a new replacement could be found. However, because of the increasing popularity of McLoone's unnamed show, he replaced Dunne on a permanent basis, and The Paul McLoone Show was launched in September, 2008. For the first five years, the show aired from 7:00 pm to 10:00 pm, then from 7:00 pm to midnight, and as of June 2012 from 9:00 pm to midnight.

In a 2014 interview for the Derry Journal, McLoone explained why he is an "accidental radio star".

A regular nominee, McLoone won two PPI Radio Awards in 2012, a gold for Specialist Music Broadcaster Of The Year, and a bronze for New Irish Music/Musical Talent Programme in his role as organiser and also as the main presenter of the annual Meteor Choice Music Prize awards ceremony held in Dublin, and a silver in the Specialist Music Programme category in both 2013 and 2014. In 2016, he won Silver in the Specialist Music Programme and Gold in Music Special/Music Event Category for his work on the Choice Music Awards Live Special he presented along with fellow Today FM colleague Alison Curtis which was held at Vicar Street in March 2016.

McLoone's interviewer from In Dublin magazine for Radio Month 2014 introduced him as "one of the most instantly recognisable voices on Ireland's airwaves".

=== Television ===
McLoone has been a writer and creative consultant on the Jam Media series Funky Fables, and their BAFTA Drama Award-winning series, Roy (both for CBBC).

McLoone provided the voice of Baboon, the secondary villain in the Cartoon Saloon-created Irish cartoon series Skunk Fu! which aired from September 2007 to September 2008.

Four years after appearing in Skunk Fu!, McLoone also appeared in the Cartoon Saloon animated film, Moon Man, voicing an unnamed father. The movie, based on the 1966 book, Moon Man by French artist Tomi Ungerer, was released in 2012,.

McLoone also appeared in the film, Sunset Heights as Dingo Green. The movie, which was released in 2002, was also featured in a Top 100 list for IMDB.

He stars as an aspiring Elvis impersonator in the music video for Cherry Bomb, a song by the Irish rock band the Minutes, which was released in March 2014.

=== The Undertones ===
After splitting in 1983, the Undertones reformed in November 1999 and when original frontman Fergal Sharkey turned down the offer to join the band, McLoone was asked to join the group, becoming the new frontman and lead singer. The band, with McLoone at the helm, played their first gig at the Nerve Centre in Derry on 19 November 1999. intermittent live appearances followed including a concert in Termon Hall, Donegal in 2001. McLoone had previously fronted a hotly tipped band with Undertones drummer, Billy Doherty, in the late 80s, called the Carrellines. Doherty and McLoone partnered again as producers at their recording studio, Big River Records in Derry, helping local punk band Schtum make several acclaimed singles before their 1995 signing with Columbia/Sony. McLoone went on to record two studio albums with the Undertones, Get What You Need (2003) and Dig Yourself Deep (2007). For Record Store Day, 20 April 2013, the band released a new single, "Much Too Late"/"When It Hurts I Count To Ten". To coincide with the 2013 release of their CD/DVD An Introduction to the Undertones, the band undertook a European summer tour. 2016 was the band's fortieth anniversary which was celebrated with live dates and the release of a book by founding member, Michael Bradley.

Since reforming in November 1999, the Undertones have performed gigs internationally with McLoone as the band's permanent frontman. They also retain a considerable live following at their concerts, which usually take place at weekends around members' day jobs, as McLoone explained for a lengthy 2015 blog interview. Audiences are typically receptive to McLoone as the band's current frontman.

== Filmography ==
Film
Year	Film	Role	Notes
2002	Sunset Heights	Diego Green	Cameo
2012	Moon Man	Father (voice)	Animated movie
TV
Year	Title	Role	Notes
2007-08	Skunk Fu!	Baboon (voice)	26 episodes
Music video
Year	Title	Band	Role
2014	Cherry Bomb	The Minutes	Unnamed Elvis Impersonator
