= Here Comes the Summer =

Single by The Undertones

from the album The Undertones
- Released: 13 July 1979
- Recorded: Nova Sound Studios, Marble Arch, London, 1979
- Genre: Pop punk; punk rock
- Length: 1:46
- Label: Sire Records
- Songwriter: John O'Neill

The Undertones singles chronology
"Jimmy Jimmy" (1979)	"Here Comes the Summer" (1979)	"You've Got My Number (Why Don't You Use It?)" (1979)

"Here Comes the Summer" is a song originally written and recorded by Northern Irish band the Undertones. The song was inspired by the Ramones and was written in 1978 by the band's principal songwriter, John O'Neill. It was included, initially as an album track, on their eponymous debut LP, which was released on 13 May 1979.

A faster version of "Here Comes the Summer" was recorded in mid-1979 and released on 13 July, reaching number 34 in the UK Singles Chart on 4 August that year. It was the Undertones' fourth single and, at just one minute and 45 seconds long, is their shortest single.

The initial album recording of "Here Comes the Summer" was first released on CD by Dojo Records under the title The Undertones: The Original Album of the Undertones. The album recording was also released on the 2009 Salvo Music re-release of the Undertones' eponymous debut album.

== Track listing ==
Side one
No.	Title	Written by	Length
1.	"Here Comes the Summer"	John O'Neill	1:45

Side two
No.	Title	Written by	Length
1.	"One Way Love"	John O'Neill	2:16
2.	"Top Twenty"	John O'Neill	2:15
