= Jimmy Jimmy (song) =

Single by the Undertones

from the album The Undertones
- Released: 20 April 1979
- Recorded: 1979
- Genre: Pop-punk
- Length: 2:45
- Label: Sire
- Songwriter: John O'Neill

The Undertones singles chronology
"Get over You" (1979)	"Jimmy Jimmy" (1979)	"Here Comes the Summer" (1979)

"Jimmy Jimmy" is a Top 20 punk rock song originally written and recorded by Northern Irish band the Undertones in the spring of 1979. The song was written by the band's main songwriter, John O'Neill, it was the Undertones' third single and was released on 20 April 1979, reaching number 16 on the UK singles chart, making "Jimmy Jimmy" the Undertones' first Top 20 single. The song was included on both the original issue and subsequent reissue of the band's debut studio album, The Undertones.

Two versions of the single were issued: A conventional black vinyl version of the single housed in a yellow paper sleeve sporting a photograph of the band's lead singer, Feargal Sharkey, as a youngster, holding a trophy he had won at a Fèis Doíre Colmcílle festival, and a green vinyl version—displaying the same image—housed in a clear plastic sleeve with a paper inlay detailing dates and venues of then-forthcoming gigs across the United Kingdom.

The decision to simultaneously release "Jimmy Jimmy" on both coloured and traditional black vinyl was made by Sire Records to give the single a competitive edge in the charts following the relative commercial failure of the band's previous single, "Get over You".

== Critical reception ==
Music journalist Cliff White reviewed the single in the May 1979 edition of Smash Hits, stating: "Hmm. Either my record player is on the brink or the Undertones have made a disappointingly weak slab of nothing special, stitched together from bits of other people's old rock hits.

== Track listing ==
Side one
No.	Title	Written by	Length
1.	"Jimmy Jimmy"	John O'Neill	2:45

Side two
No.	Title	Written by	Length
1.	"Mars Bars"	Damian O'Neill, Michael Bradley	2:08
