= John O'Neill (guitarist) =

Northern Ireland-born musician (born 1957)

John Joseph O'Neill
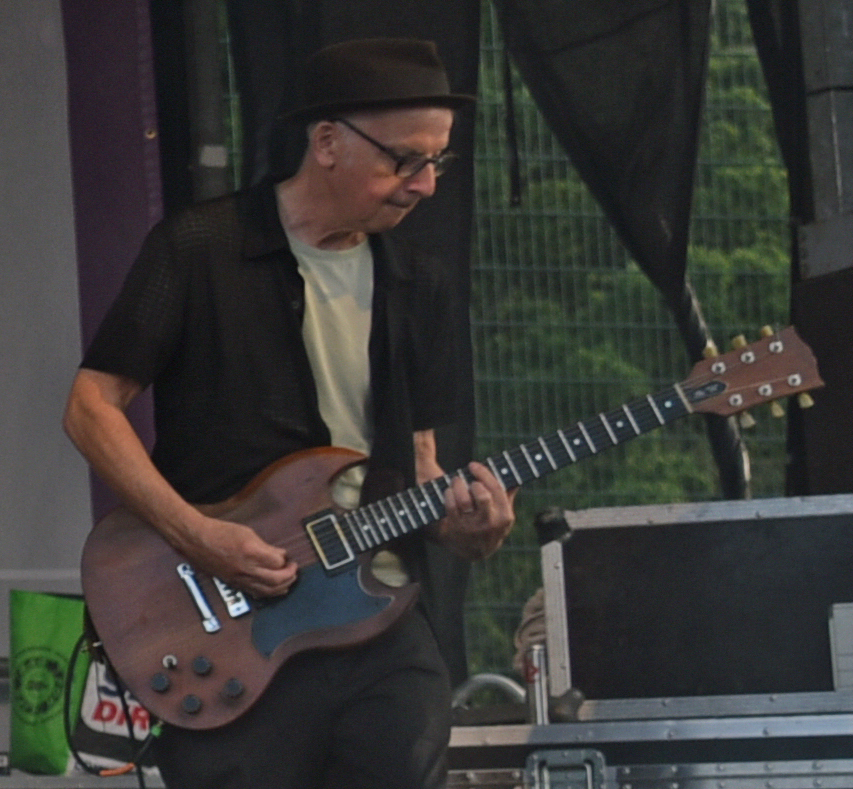
- O'Neill in 2022

Background information
- Also known as: Sean O'Neill
- Born: John Joseph O'Neill; 26 August 1957 (age 68); Derry, Northern Ireland
- Genres: Punk rock; pop-punk; new wave
- Occupation: Musician
- Instrument: Guitar
- Years active: 1976–1994, 1999–present
- Labels: Sire Records; Ardeck Records; Virgin Records
- Member of: The Undertones
- Formerly of: That Petrol Emotion

John Joseph O'Neill (born 26 August 1957) is a musician who is the rhythm guitarist and principal songwriter of the punk rock and new wave band the Undertones. O'Neill, along with his younger brother Vincent and friends Feargal Sharkey, Michael Bradley and Billy Doherty, founded the Undertones in 1975, but Vincent O'Neill was replaced the following year with his younger brother Damian O'Neill, who became the band's lead guitarist.

John O'Neill wrote the majority of the band's singles and a number of album tracks (occasionally collaborating with his brother Damian or Michael Bradley). Undertones songs written by John O'Neill include the singles "Teenage Kicks", "Jimmy Jimmy", "Here Comes the Summer" and "You've Got My Number", and such notable album tracks as "When Saturday Comes", "I Gotta Getta", "Girls That Don't Talk" and "You're Welcome".

After releasing four albums and 13 singles, the Undertones disbanded in 1983; they reformed in November 1999. Since then, the band (who have a new lead singer, fellow Derry native Paul McLoone who also serves as a radio presenter for the Irish national and independent radio station Today FM) have released two more albums and performed a number of gigs in both the UK, Ireland, Europe and North America.

In 1985, the O'Neill brothers formed That Petrol Emotion, an acclaimed rock act that disbanded in 1994.

In the 1990s, he formed a trip hop group named Rare under the stage name Seán Ó'Néill with vocalist Mary Gallagher. Despite some positive reviews in the music press, they only had one notable chart appearance and disbanded shortly after the release of their only album in 1998.
