= Damian O'Neill =

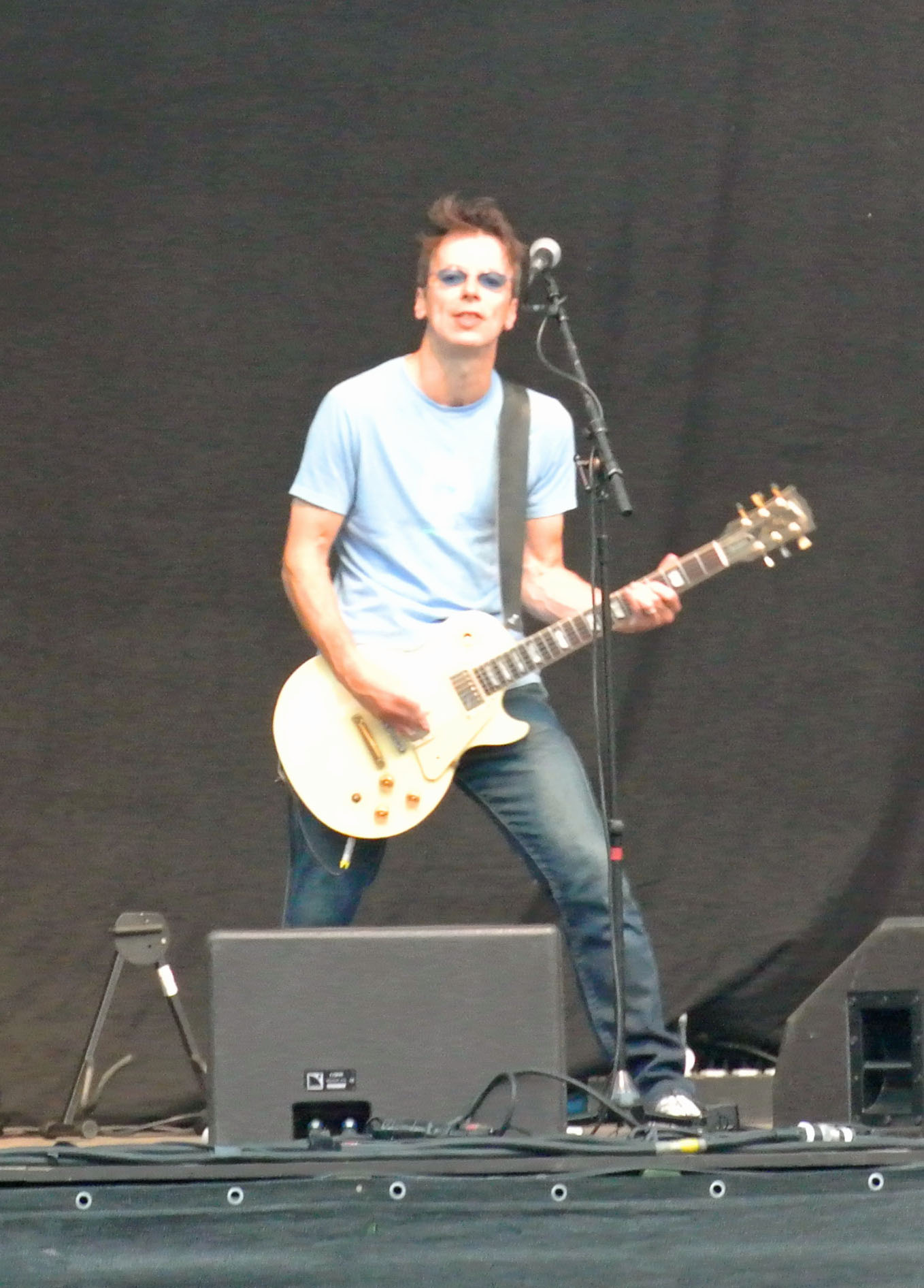
- O'Neill performing with The Undertones in 2012

Background information
- Born: Stephen Damian O'Neill; 15 January 1961 (age 65); Derry, Northern Ireland
- Genre: Punk rock
- Occupation: Musician
- Instruments: Guitar, keyboards
- Years active: 1976–1994, 1999–present
- Labels: Sire Records; Ardeck Records; Virgin Records

Stephen Damian O'Neill (born 15 January 1961) is the lead guitarist in the pop-punk band The Undertones. He joined the band following the departure of his older brother, Vincent, in 1976, and remained with the band until their break up in 1983. O'Neill wrote several album tracks and singles during the career of The Undertones, usually writing with bassist Michael Bradley.

After the Undertones split in 1983, O'Neill formed That Petrol Emotion with his guitarist brother, John O'Neill.

The Undertones reformed in 1999 and O'Neill continues to perform and record with them.

In 2001, O'Neill released the experimental electronic album A Quiet Revolution on Alan McGee's Poptones label. Furthermore, he as X-Valdez (nom de plume) released a 12-inch "Higher Grace" with arrangements by Xavier Jamaux and Athena Constantine on vocals on Toy's Factory in 2000.

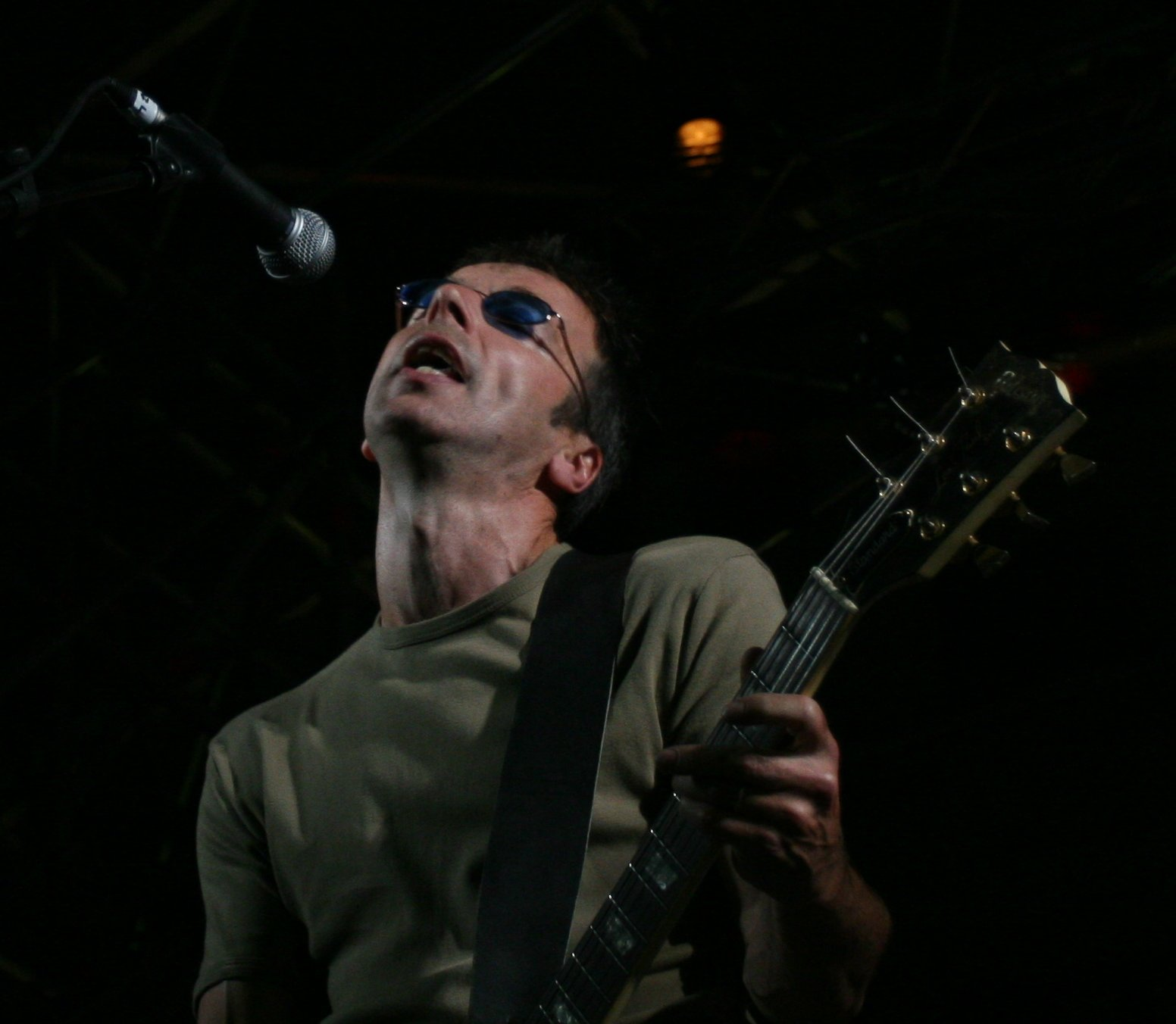
Damian O'Neill onstage with the Undertones in Barcelona 2007

Since 2012, O'Neill and three of his former bandmates of That Petrol Emotion, Raymond Gorman, Ciaran McLaughlin and Brendan Kelly are active as London-based The Everlasting Yeah, playing kosmische Krautrock influenced music mixed with most individual soundscapes creating sheer amazing atmospheres with powerful guitary, percussionized tunes. Their first LP Anima Rising was released in late 2014.

On 10 November 2014, he released a solo-single "Trapped in a Cage" on Overground Records. The 7" vinyl is limited to 500 copies only, however, it is downloadable via iTunes.

O'Neill is left-handed but plays the guitar right-handed.

== Dimple Discs ==
Dimple Discs is O'Neill's record label, which has released records by bands such as the American glam rock power pop band Baby Shakes, who covered The Undertones' "Really Really" for a single release on the label.
