= Michael Bradley (musician) =

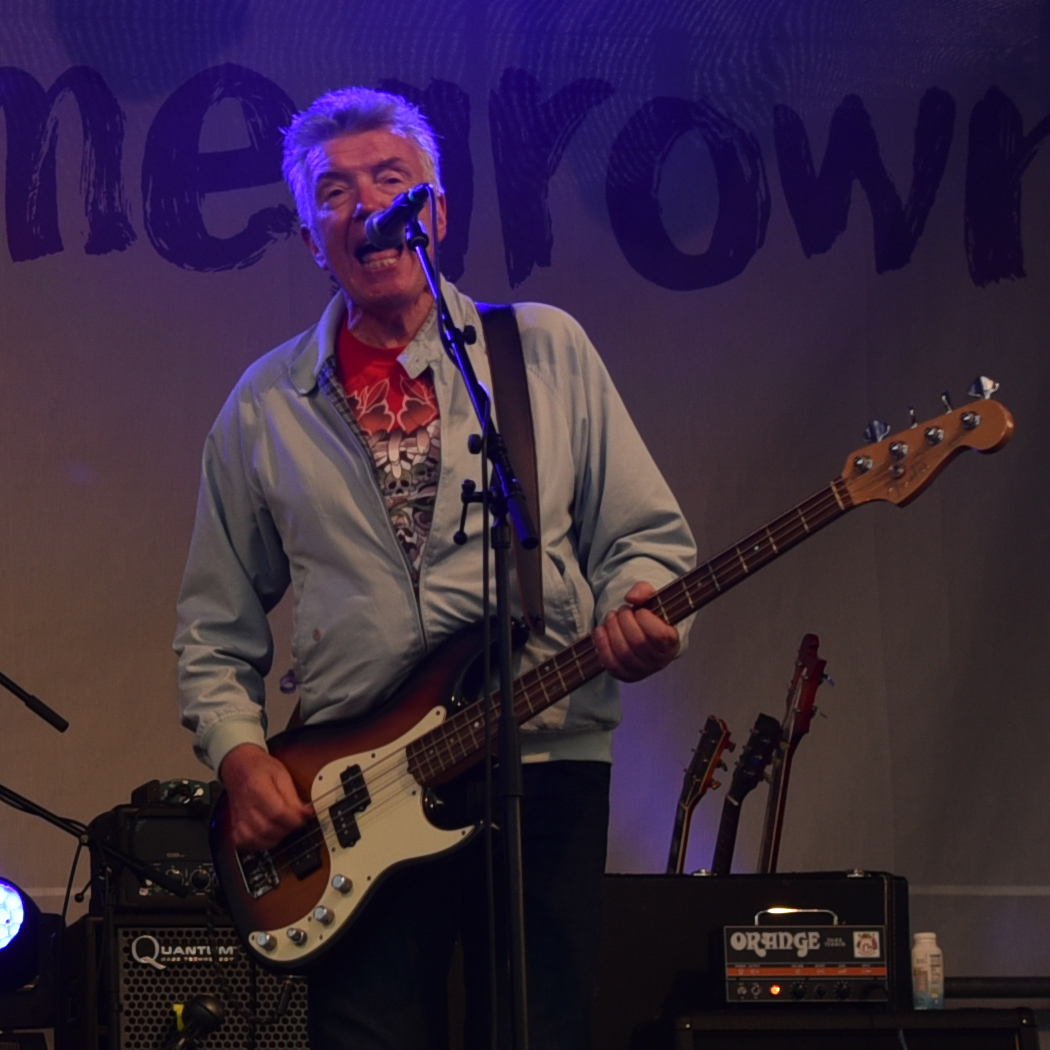
- Bradley performing with The Undertones in 2022

Background information
- Born: Michael Bradley; 13 August 1959 (age 67); Derry
- Genre: Punk rock
- Occupations: Musician, producer, DJ
- Instrument: Bass guitar
- Years active: 1976–1983, 1999–present

Michael "Mickey" Bradley (born August 13, 1959) is the bassist for the Northern Irish pop punk band the Undertones. Bradley is also a radio producer for BBC Radio Foyle and presented a one-hour programme on Radio Ulster: "After Midnight with Mickey Bradley". The show featured tracks from the new wave and punk era. Bradley now presents a show titled "The Late Show with Mickey Bradley" which airs Friday nights on BBC Radio Ulster.

In 2016, Bradley wrote a book titled Teenage Kicks: My Life as an Undertone.

== Personal life ==
Bradley was born in Derry and is married to Elaine Duffy. They have four children.

In October 2006, Bradley revealed that he had received treatment for bowel cancer.
