= British rock music =

Rock music from the United Kingdom

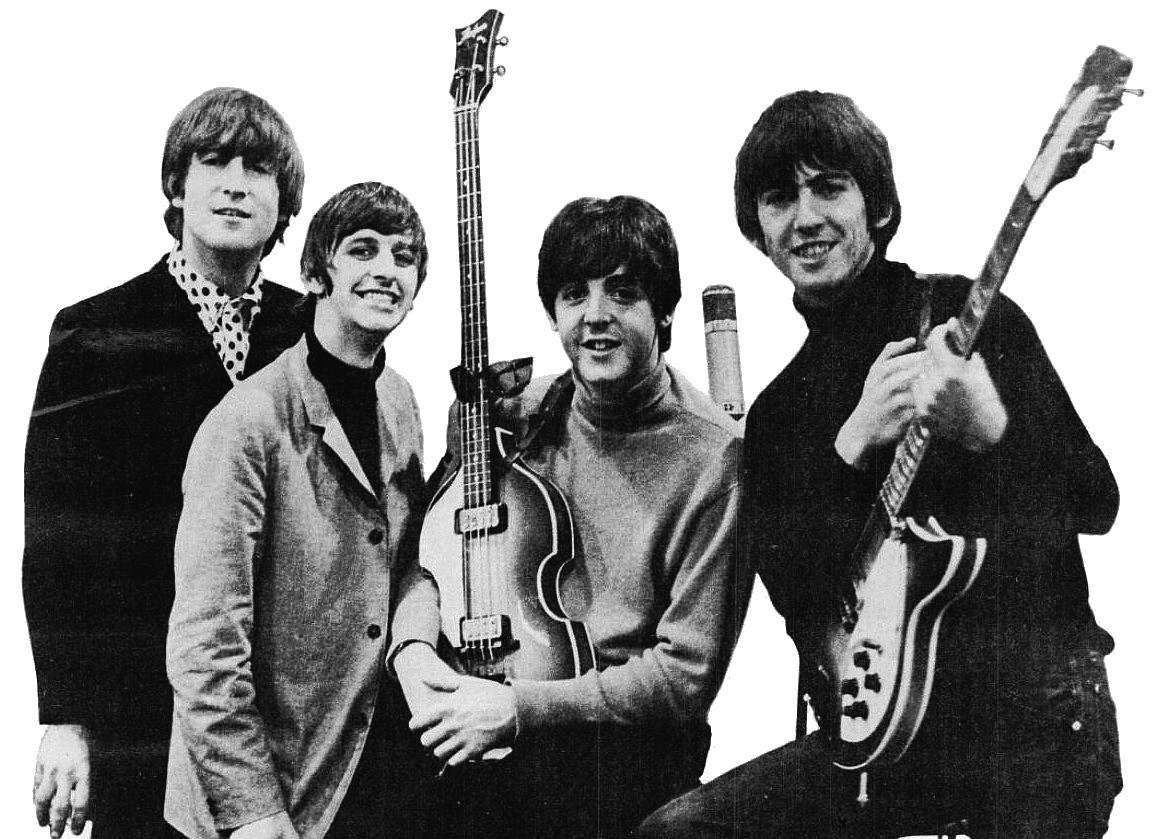
The Beatles (British Invasion/beat music)

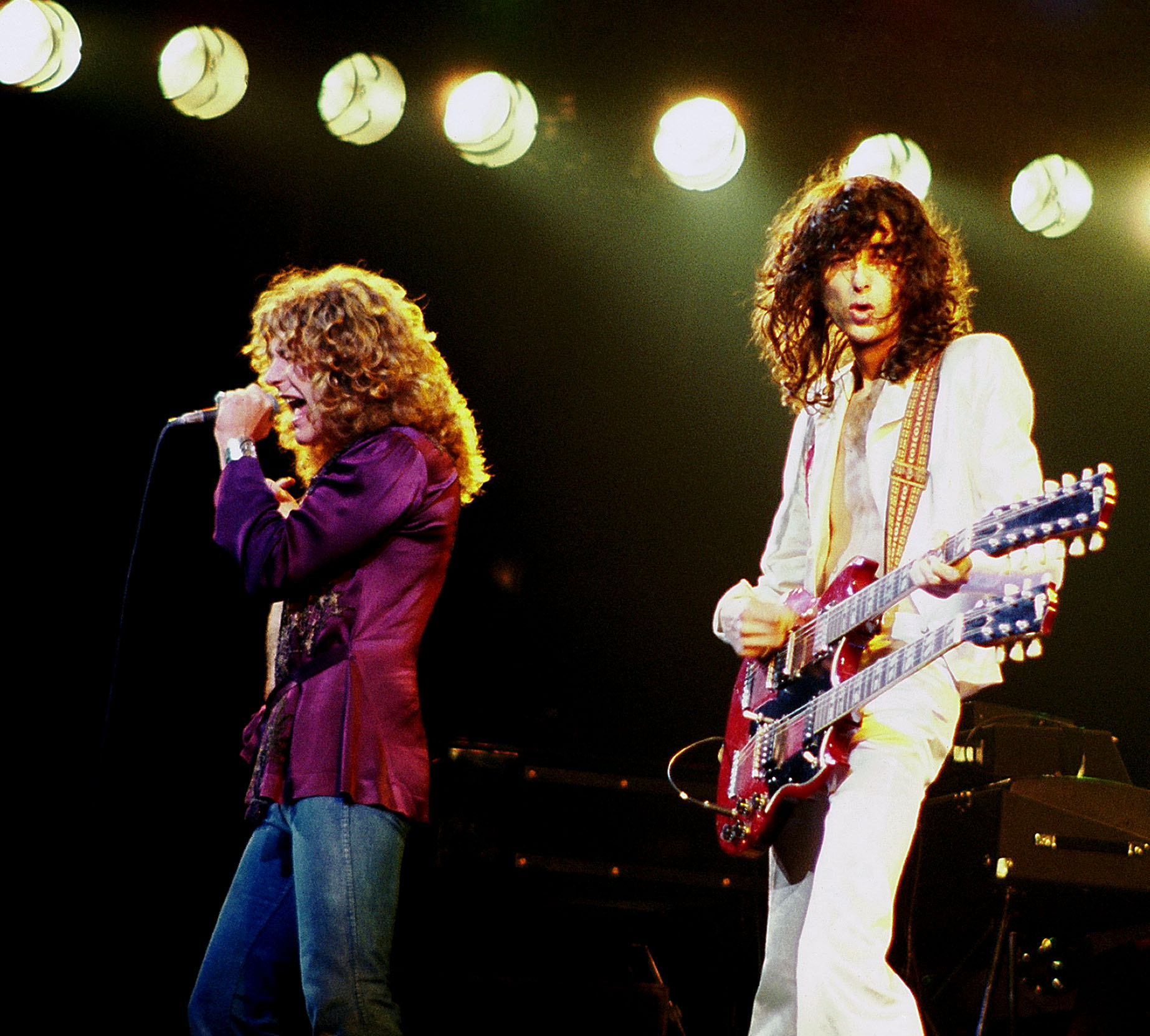
Led Zeppelin (hard rock and blues rock)

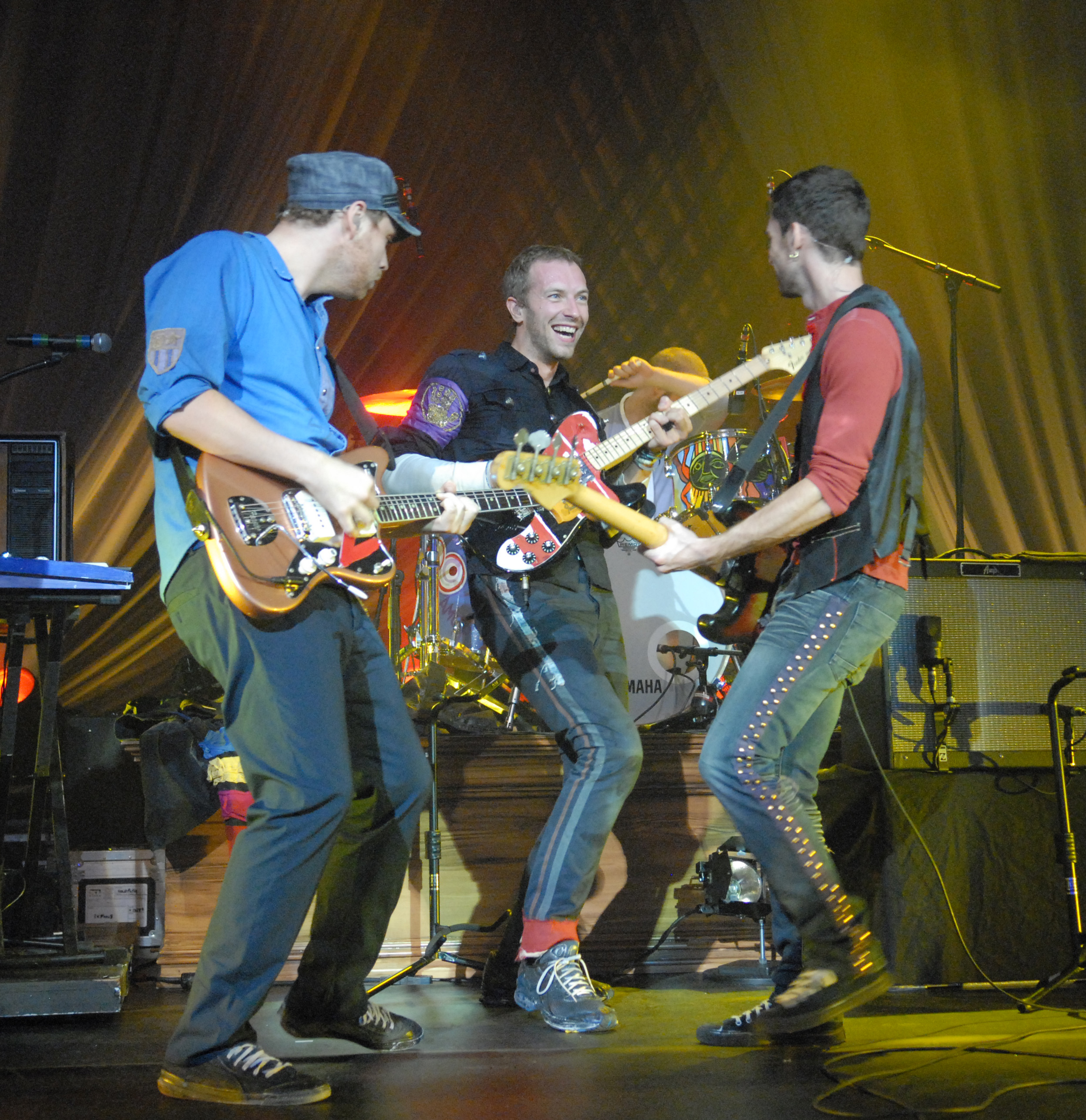
Coldplay (alternative rock)

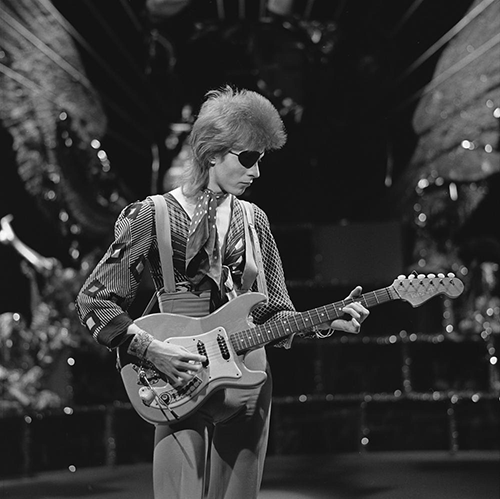
David Bowie (glam rock and art rock)

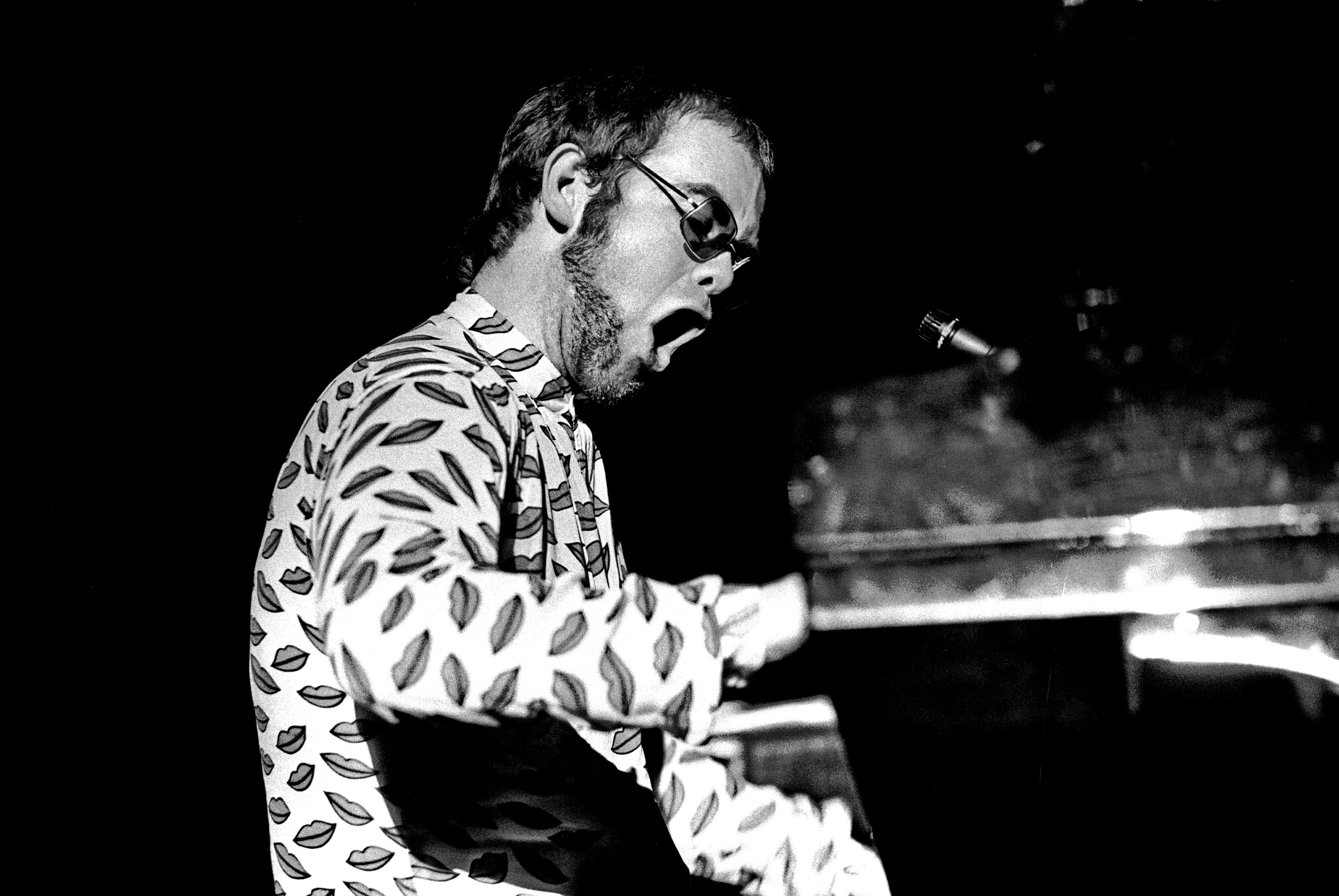
Elton John (soft rock and glam rock)

British rock describes a wide variety of forms of music made in the United Kingdom. Since around 1964, with the "British Invasion" of the United States spearheaded by the Beatles, British rock music has had a considerable impact on the development of American music and rock music across the world.

Initial attempts to emulate American rock and roll took place in Britain in the mid-1950s, but the terms "rock music" and "rock" usually refer to the genre as a whole, since more styles derived in the late 50s and early 60s, such as surf and blues rock, along with many other sub genres. The term is often used in combination with other terms to describe a variety of hybrids or subgenres, and is often contrasted with pop music, with which it shares many structures and instrumentation. Rock music has tended to be more orientated toward the albums market, putting an emphasis on innovation, virtuosity, performance and song writing by the performers.

Some genres and sub-genres stemming from British rock include beat music, progressive rock, art rock, hard rock, heavy metal, punk, post-punk, new wave, and indie rock.

== Early British rock and roll ==
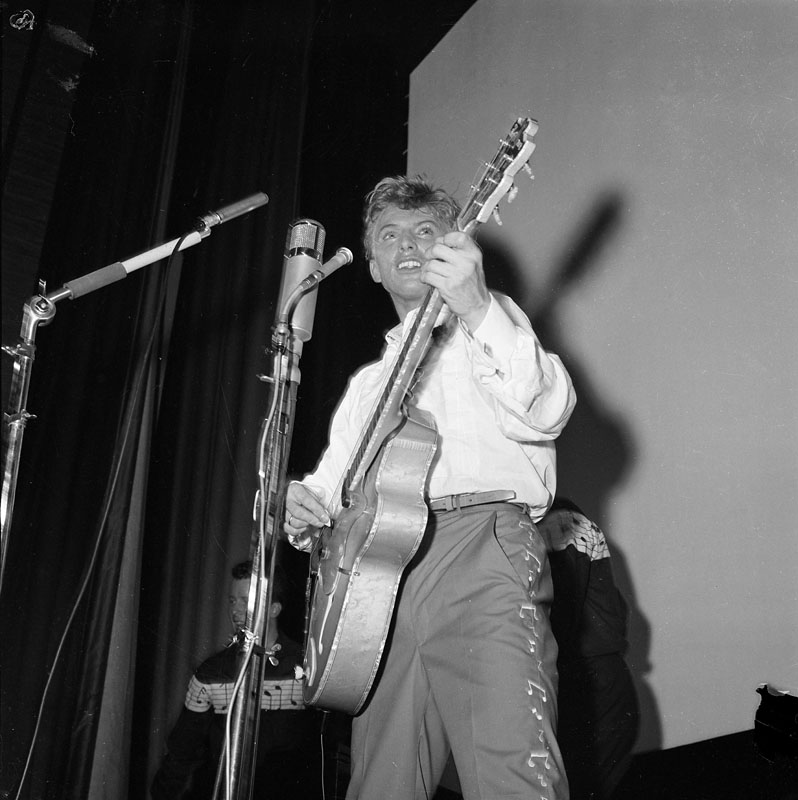
Tommy Steele, one of the first British rock and rollers, performing in Stockholm in 1957

In the 1950s, Britain was well placed to receive American rock and roll music and culture. It shared a common language, had been exposed to American culture through the stationing of troops in the country, and shared many social developments, including the emergence of distinct youth sub-cultures, which in Britain included the Teddy Boys. Trad jazz became popular, and many of its musicians were influenced by related American styles, including boogie-woogie and the blues. The skiffle craze, led by Lonnie Donegan, utilised mostly amateurish versions mainly of American folk songs and encouraged many of the subsequent generation of rock and roll, folk, R&B and beat musicians to start performing. At the same time British audiences were beginning to encounter American rock and roll, initially through films including Blackboard Jungle (1955) and Rock Around the Clock (1955). Both films contained the Bill Haley & His Comets hit "Rock Around the Clock", which first entered the British charts in early 1955 – four months before it reached the US pop charts – topped the British charts later that year and again in 1956, and helped identify rock and roll with teenage delinquency. American rock and roll acts such as Elvis Presley, Little Richard and Buddy Holly thereafter became major forces in the British charts.

The initial response of the British music industry was to attempt to produce copies of American records, recorded with session musicians and often fronted by teen idols. British rock and rollers soon began to appear, including Wee Willie Harris and Tommy Steele. The bland or wholly imitative form of much British rock and roll in this period meant that the American product remained dominant. However, in 1958 Britain produced its first "authentic" rock and roll song and star, when Cliff Richard reached number 2 in the charts with "Move It". British impresario Larry Parnes fashioned young singers to the new trend, giving them corny names such as Billy Fury, Marty Wilde and Vince Eager. At the same time, TV shows such as Six-Five Special and Oh Boy!, both produced by Jack Good, promoted the careers of British rock and rollers like Marty Wilde and Adam Faith. Cliff Richard and his backing band The Drifters, who quickly changed their name to The Shadows, were the most successful home grown rock and roll based acts of the era. Other leading acts included Joe Brown, and Johnny Kidd & The Pirates, whose 1960 hit song "Shakin' All Over" became a rock and roll standard. The first American rock and roll artist to hit British stages and appear on television was Charlie Gracie, quickly followed by Gene Vincent in December 1959, soon joined on tour by his friend Eddie Cochran. The producer Joe Meek was the first to produce sizeable rock hits in England, culminating with The Tornados' instrumental "Telstar", which went to number one in both the UK and USA.

== Development in the 1960s and early 1970s ==
=== Beat music ===
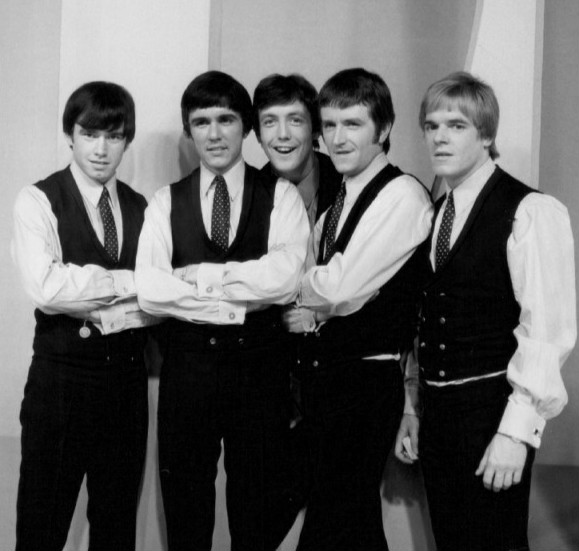
The Dave Clark Five shown in 1966

In late 1950s Britain a flourishing culture of groups began to emerge, often out of the declining skiffle scene, in major urban centres in the UK like Liverpool, Manchester, Birmingham and London. This was particularly true in Liverpool, where it has been estimated that there were around 350 different bands active, often playing ballrooms, concert halls and clubs.

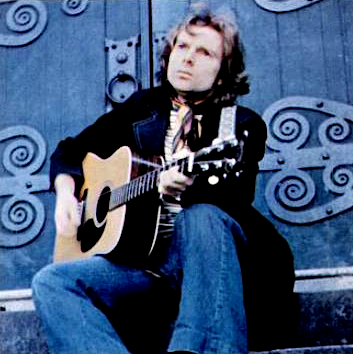
Van Morrison in 1972

These beat bands were heavily influenced by American groups of the era, such as Buddy Holly and the Crickets (from which groups the Beatles and The Hollies derived their names), as well as earlier British groups such as The Shadows. After the national success of the Beatles in Britain from 1962, a number of Liverpool performers were able to follow them into the charts, including Gerry & The Pacemakers, The Searchers, and Cilla Black. Among the most successful beat acts from Birmingham were The Spencer Davis Group and The Moody Blues; The Animals came from Newcastle, and Them, featuring Van Morrison, from Belfast. From London, the term Tottenham Sound was largely based around The Dave Clark Five, but other London bands that benefited from the beat boom of this era included the Rolling Stones, The Kinks and The Yardbirds. The first non-Liverpool, non-Brian Epstein-managed band to break through in the UK were Freddie and the Dreamers, who were based in Manchester, as were Herman's Hermits and The Hollies. The beat movement provided most of the bands responsible for the British Invasion of the American pop charts in the period after 1964, and furnished the model for many important developments in pop and rock music, particularly through their small group format – typically lead guitar, rhythm guitar, bass guitar, and drums, sometimes replacing the rhythm guitar with keyboards, either with a lead singer or with one of the musicians taking lead vocals and the others providing vocal harmonies.

=== British blues boom ===
In parallel with beat music, in the late 1950s and early 1960s a British blues scene was developing, recreating the sounds of American R&B and later particularly the sounds of bluesmen Robert Johnson, Howlin' Wolf, and Muddy Waters. Initially led by purist blues followers such as Alexis Korner and Cyril Davies, it reached its height of mainstream popularity in the 1960s, when it developed a distinctive and influential style dominated by electric guitar and made international stars of several proponents of the genre including The Rolling Stones, The Yardbirds, Eric Clapton, Cream, Fleetwood Mac and Led Zeppelin (who morphed out of The Yardbirds). A number of these moved through Blues-rock to different forms of rock music, with increasing emphasis on technical virtuosity and improvisational skills. As a result, British blues helped to form many of the subgenres of rock, including psychedelic rock and heavy metal music. Since then direct interest in the blues in Britain has declined, but many of the key performers have returned to it in recent years, new acts have emerged and there has been a renewed interest in the genre.

=== The Beatles and the British Invasion ===
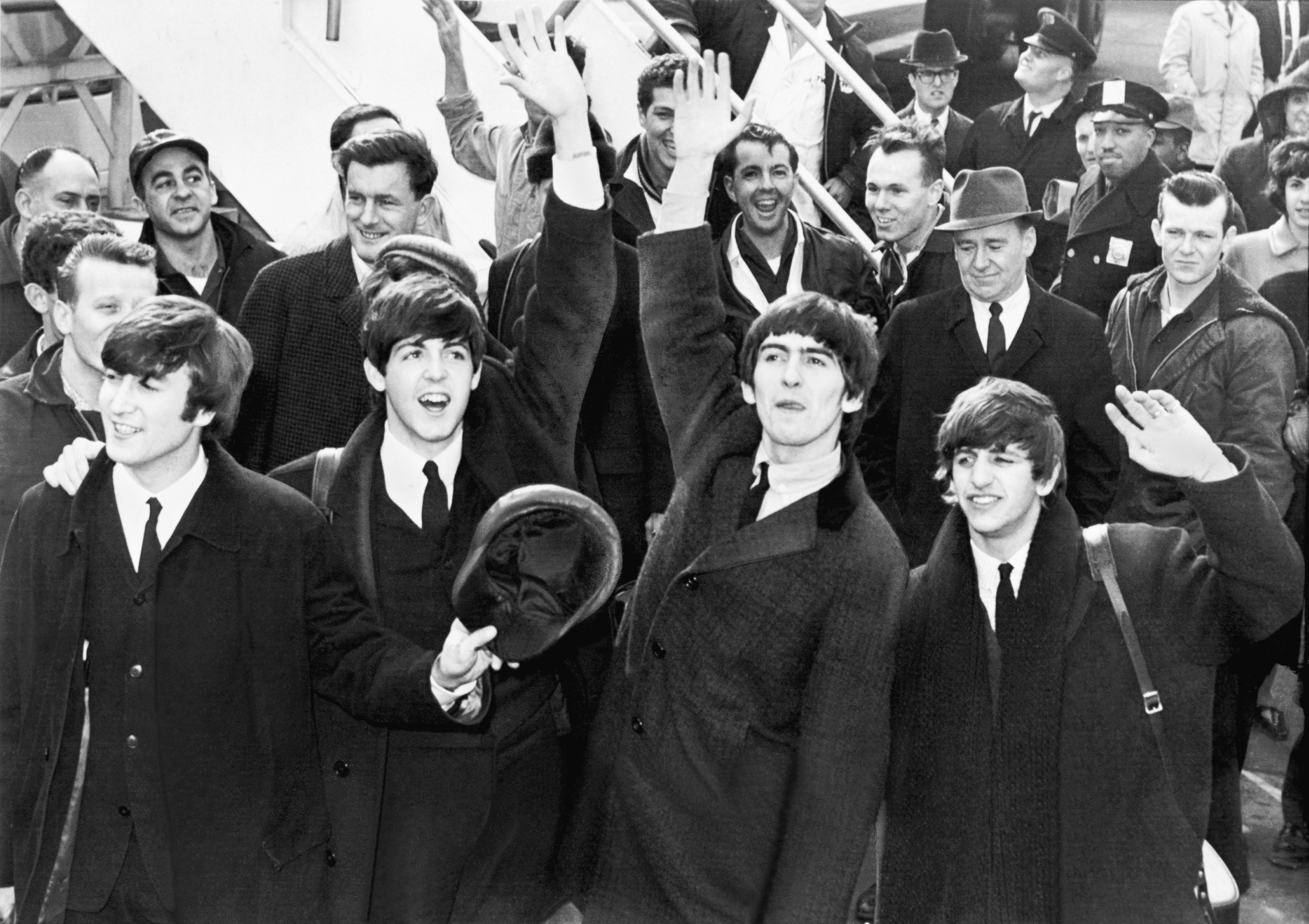
The arrival of the Beatles in the U.S., and their subsequent appearance on The Ed Sullivan Show, marked the start of the British Invasion.

The Beatles themselves were less influenced by blues music than the music of later American genres such as soul and Motown. Their popular success in Britain in the early 1960s was matched by their new and highly influential emphases on their own song writing, and on technical production values, some of which were shared by other British beat groups. On 7 February 1964, the CBS Evening News with Walter Cronkite ran a story about the Beatles' United States arrival in which the correspondent said "The British Invasion this time goes by the code name Beatlemania". Two days later, on 9 February, they appeared on The Ed Sullivan Show. Seventy five per cent of Americans watching television that night viewed their appearance thus "launching" the invasion with a massive wave of chart success that would continue until the Beatles broke up in 1970. On 4 April 1964, the Beatles held the top 5 positions on the Billboard Hot 100 singles chart, the only time to date that any act has accomplished this. During the next two years, Peter and Gordon, The Animals, Manfred Mann, Petula Clark, Freddie and the Dreamers, Wayne Fontana and the Mindbenders, Herman's Hermits, The Rolling Stones, The Troggs, and Donovan would have one or more number one singles in the US. Other acts that were part of the British Invasion included The Who, The Kinks, and The Dave Clark Five; these acts were also successful within the UK, although clearly the term "British Invasion" itself was not applied there except as a description of what was happening in the USA. British Invasion acts influenced fashion, haircuts and manners of the 1960s of what was to be known as the "Counterculture". In particular, the Beatles' movie A Hard Day's Night and fashions from Carnaby Street led American media to proclaim England as the centre of the music and fashion world. The success of British acts of the time, particularly that of the Beatles themselves, has been seen as revitalising rock music in the US and influenced many American bands to develop their sound and style. The growth of the British music industry itself, and its increasingly prominent global role in the forefront of changing popular culture, also enabled it to discover and first establish the success of new rock artists from elsewhere in the world, notably Jimi Hendrix and, in the early 1970s, Bob Marley.

=== Freakbeat ===
Freakbeat is a loosely defined subgenre of rock and roll and pop music developed mainly by harder-driving British groups, often those with a dandy culture following, during the Swinging London period of the mid-to late 1960s. The genre bridges beat, R&B, pop and psychedelia. The term was coined by English music journalist Phil Smee. AllMusic writes that "freakbeat" is loosely defined, but generally describes the more obscure but hard-edged artists of the British Invasion era such as the Creation, the Pretty Things or Denny Laine's early solo work. Much of the material collected on Rhino Records's 2001 box-set compilation Nuggets II: Original Artyfacts from the British Empire and Beyond, 1964–1969 can be classified as freakbeat. Other bands include The Smoke, The Eyes, The Birds, The Action and The Sorrows.

=== Psychedelic rock ===
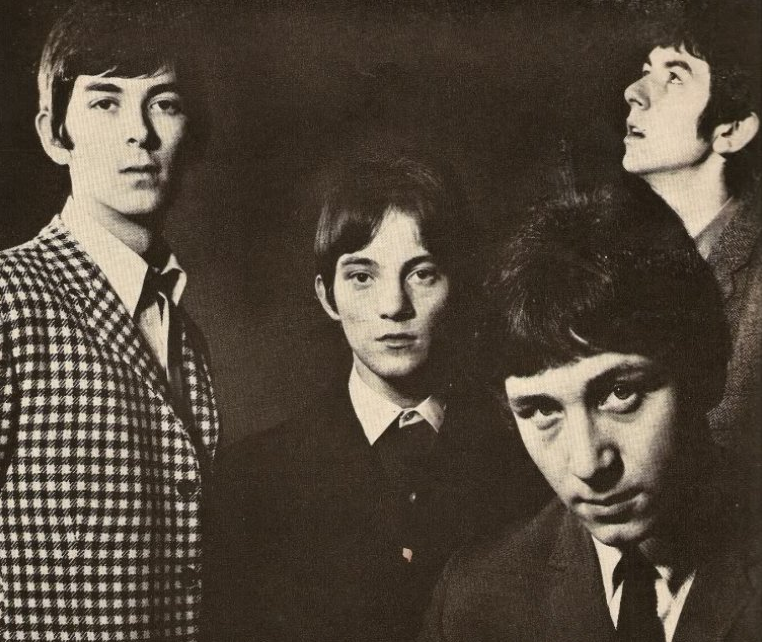
The Small Faces were a band which began with strong R&B and soul influences to transition into psychedelic rock

Psychedelic music is a style of music that is inspired or influenced by psychedelic culture and attempts to replicate and enhance the mind-altering experiences of hallucinogenic drugs. It particularly grew out of blues-rock and progressive folk music and drew on non-Western sources such as Indian music's ragas and sitars as well as studio effects and long instrumental passages and surreal lyrics. It emerged during the mid-1960s among progressive folk acts in Britain such as The Incredible String Band and Donovan, as well as in the United States, and rapidly moved into rock and pop music being taken up by acts including the Beatles, The Yardbirds, The Moody Blues, Small Faces, The Move, Traffic, Cream and Pink Floyd. Psychedelic rock bridged the transition from early blues-rock to progressive rock, art rock, experimental rock, hard rock and eventually heavy metal that would become major genres in the 1970s. Shock rock pioneer Arthur Brown performed his 1968 hit song "Fire" wearing black and white makeup (corpse paint) and a burning headpiece. He has been a significant influence on extreme acts that have followed.

=== Mainstream and global success ===
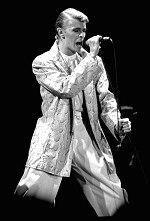
David Bowie, Ekeberghallen, Oslo, Norway, 1978

By the early 1970s, rock music had become more mainstream, and internationalised, with many British acts becoming massively successful in the United States and globally. Some of the most successful artists, such as the individual members of The Beatles, Elton John, David Bowie, and Rod Stewart performed their own songs (and in some cases those written by others) in an eclectic variety of styles, in which the presentation of the performance itself became increasingly important. By way of contrast, the former psychedelic-pop act, The Status Quo, dropped the definite article from their name and became one of the most successful British rock acts by presenting an apparently unsophisticated style of boogie-based rock music; and Van Morrison gained international critical acclaim through a blend of rock, jazz and blues styles. Some well-established British bands that began their careers in the British Invasion, notably The Rolling Stones, The Who and The Kinks, also developed their own particular styles and expanded their international fan base during that period, but would be joined by new acts in new styles and subgenres.

== New subgenres in the 1970s ==
=== British folk rock ===
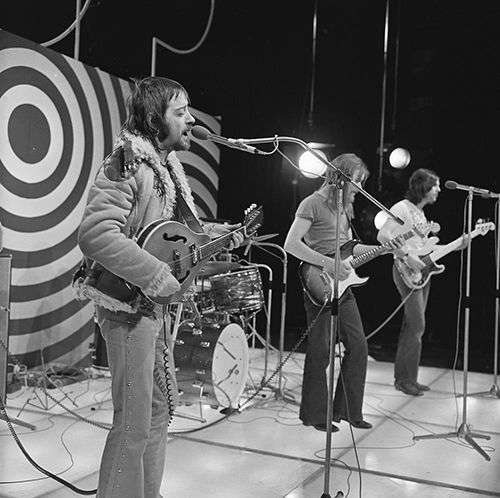
Fairport Convention on Dutch television program TopPop in 1972

British folk rock developed in Britain during the mid to late 1960s by the bands Fairport Convention, and Pentangle which built on elements of American folk rock, and on the second British folk revival. Using traditional English music as its basis, these bands drew heavily on the Child Ballads, ballads of the British Isles from the medieval period until the 19th century. An early success was Fairport Convention's 1969 album Liege and Lief, but it became more significant in the 1970s, when it was taken up by groups such as Pentangle, Steeleye Span and the Albion Band. It was rapidly adopted and developed in the surrounding Celtic cultures of Brittany, where it was pioneered by Alan Stivell and bands like Malicorne; in Ireland by groups such as Horslips; and also in Scotland, Wales and the Isle of Man and Cornwall, to produce Celtic rock and its derivatives. It was also influential in those parts of the world with close cultural connections to the UK, such as the US and Canada and gave rise to the subgenre of Medieval folk rock and the fusion genres of folk punk and folk metal. By the end of the 1970s the genre was in steep decline in popularity, as other forms of music, including punk and electronic began to be established.

=== Progressive rock ===
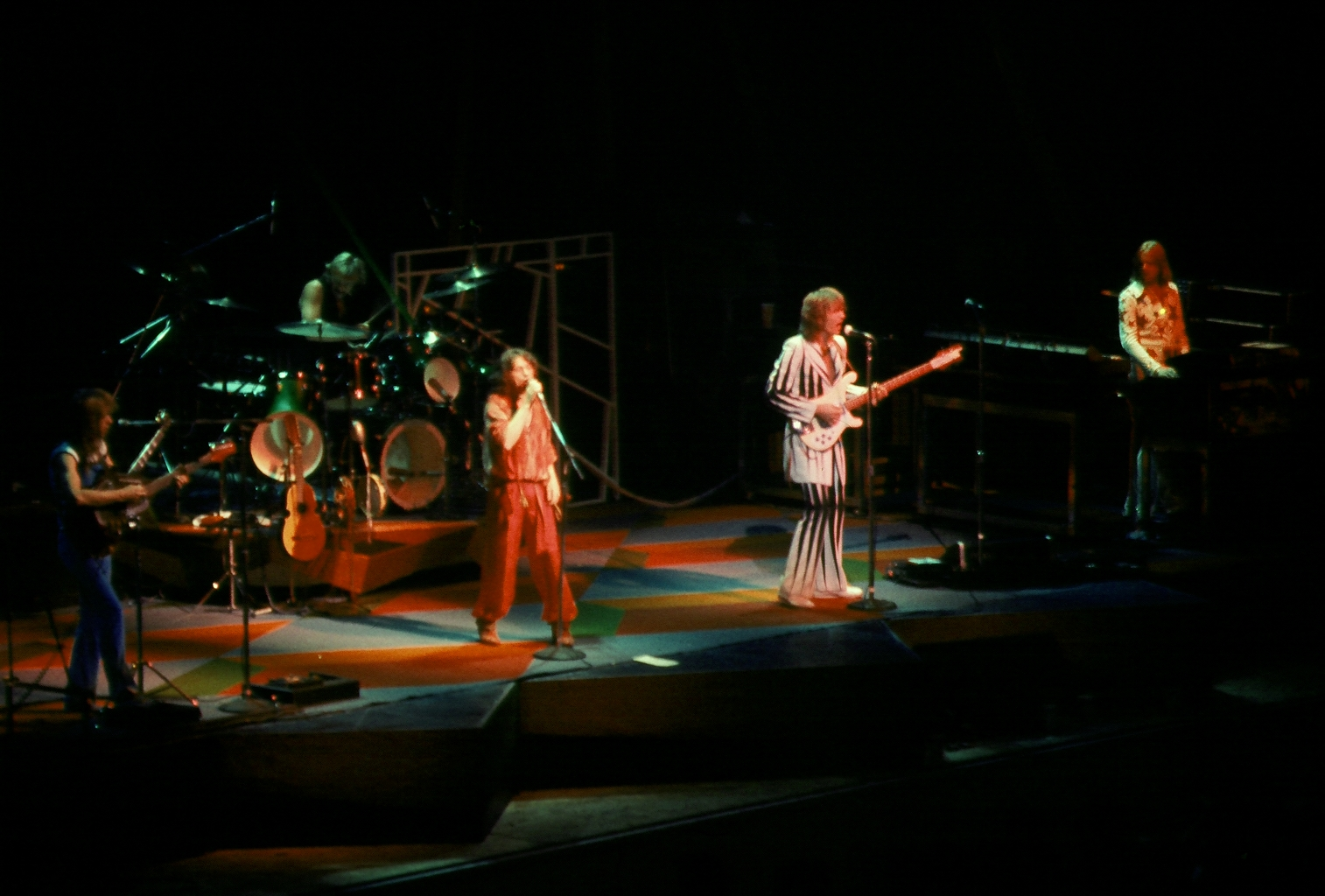
Yes performing in Indianapolis in 1977.

Progressive or prog rock developed out of late 1960s blues-rock and psychedelic rock. Dominated by British bands, it was part of an attempt to elevate rock music to new levels of artistic credibility. Progressive rock bands attempted to push the technical and compositional boundaries of rock by going beyond the standard verse-chorus-based song structures. The arrangements often incorporated elements drawn from classical, jazz, and international sources later called "world music". Instrumentals were common, while songs with lyrics were sometimes conceptual, abstract, or based in fantasy. Progressive rock bands sometimes used concept albums that made unified statements, usually telling an epic story or tackling a grand overarching theme. King Crimson's 1969 début album, In the Court of the Crimson King, which mixed powerful guitar riffs and mellotron, with jazz and symphonic music, is often taken as the key recording in progressive rock, helping the widespread adoption of the genre in the early 1970s among existing blues-rock and psychedelic bands, as well as newly formed acts. The term was applied to the music of bands such as Yes, Genesis, Pink Floyd, Jethro Tull, Soft Machine, Electric Light Orchestra, Procol Harum, Hawkwind, and Emerson, Lake & Palmer. It reached its peak of popularity in the mid-1970s, but had mixed critical acclaim and the punk movement can be seen as a reaction against its musicality and perceived pomposity. Many bands broke up, but some, including Genesis, ELP, Yes, and Pink Floyd, regularly scored Top Ten albums with successful accompanying worldwide tours.

=== Glam rock ===
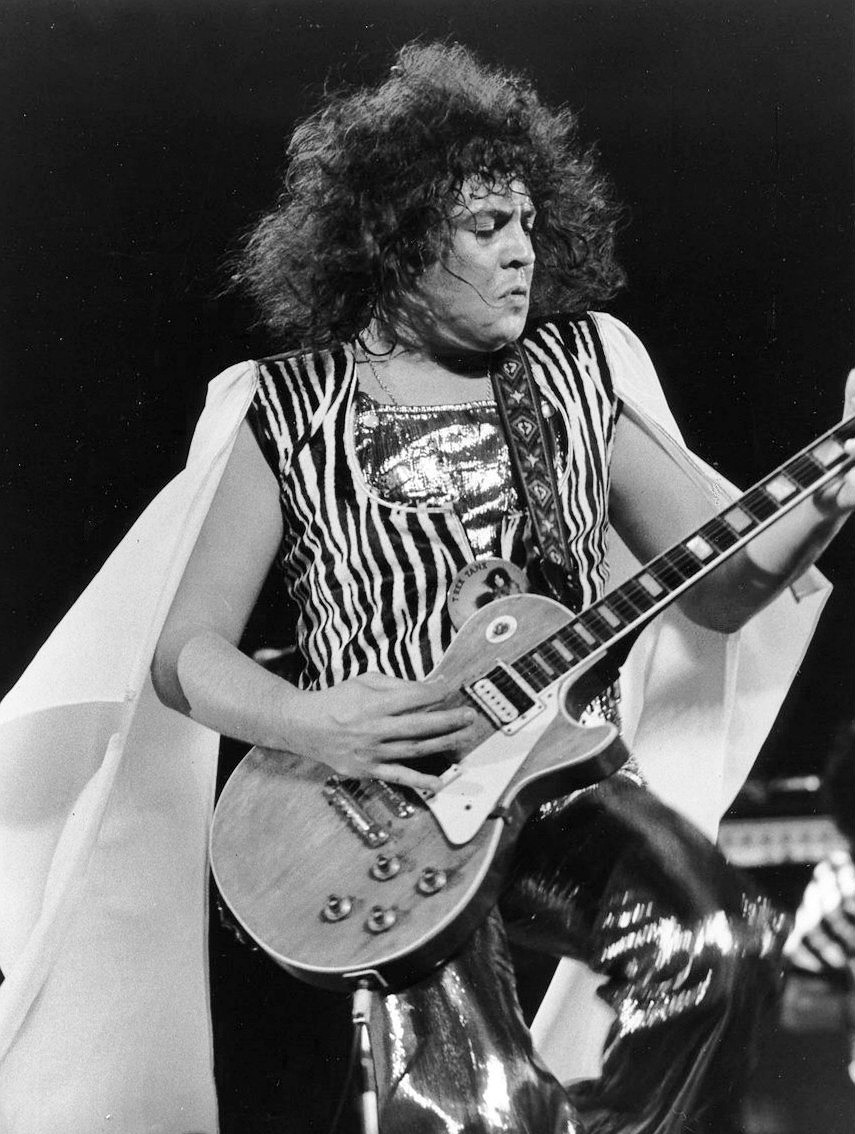
Marc Bolan of T. Rex performing in 1973

Glam or glitter rock developed in the UK in the post-hippie early 1970s. It was characterised by "outrageous" clothes, makeup, hairstyles, and platform-soled boots. The flamboyant lyrics, costumes, and visual styles of glam performers were a campy, playing with categories of sexuality in a theatrical blend of nostalgic references to science fiction and old movies, all over a guitar-driven hard rock sound. Pioneers of the genre included David Bowie, Roxy Music, Mott the Hoople, Marc Bolan and T. Rex. These, and many other acts straddled the divide between pop and rock music, managing to maintain a level of respectability with rock audiences, while enjoying success in the UK singles chart, including Queen and Elton John. Other performers aimed much more directly for the popular music market, where they were the dominant groups of their era, including Slade, Wizzard, Mud and Sweet. The glitter image was pushed to its limits by Gary Glitter and The Glitter Band. Largely confined to the British music scene where it originated, glam rock peaked during the mid-1970s, before it declined in the face of punk rock and new wave trends. It has had a direct influence on acts that rose to prominence later.

=== Hard rock/heavy metal ===
With roots in blues-rock, psychedelic rock and garage rock the bands that created heavy metal developed a thick, powerful sound, characterised by overt rhythmic basslines, highly amplified distortion, extended guitar solos, emphatic beats, and overall loudness. Heavy metal lyrics and performance styles often incorporated elements of fantasy and science fiction, and are generally associated with masculinity and machismo. The three pioneering heavy metal bands, Led Zeppelin, Black Sabbath, and Deep Purple, were all British and, while gaining little critical acclaim, they and the next generation of metal groups, which included American, Australian and continental bands beside British acts Judas Priest, Motörhead and Rainbow, attracted large audiences and record sales. Rainbow moved heavy metal into stadium rock while Motörhead introduced a punk rock sensibility and an increasing emphasis on speed. After a decline in popularity in the late 1970s Judas Priest discarded most of the genre's blues influences, particularly on their 1980 album British Steel, which opened the door for the new wave of British heavy metal (NWOBHM) including Iron Maiden, Vardis, Saxon and Def Leppard, and a return to popularity in the 1980s.

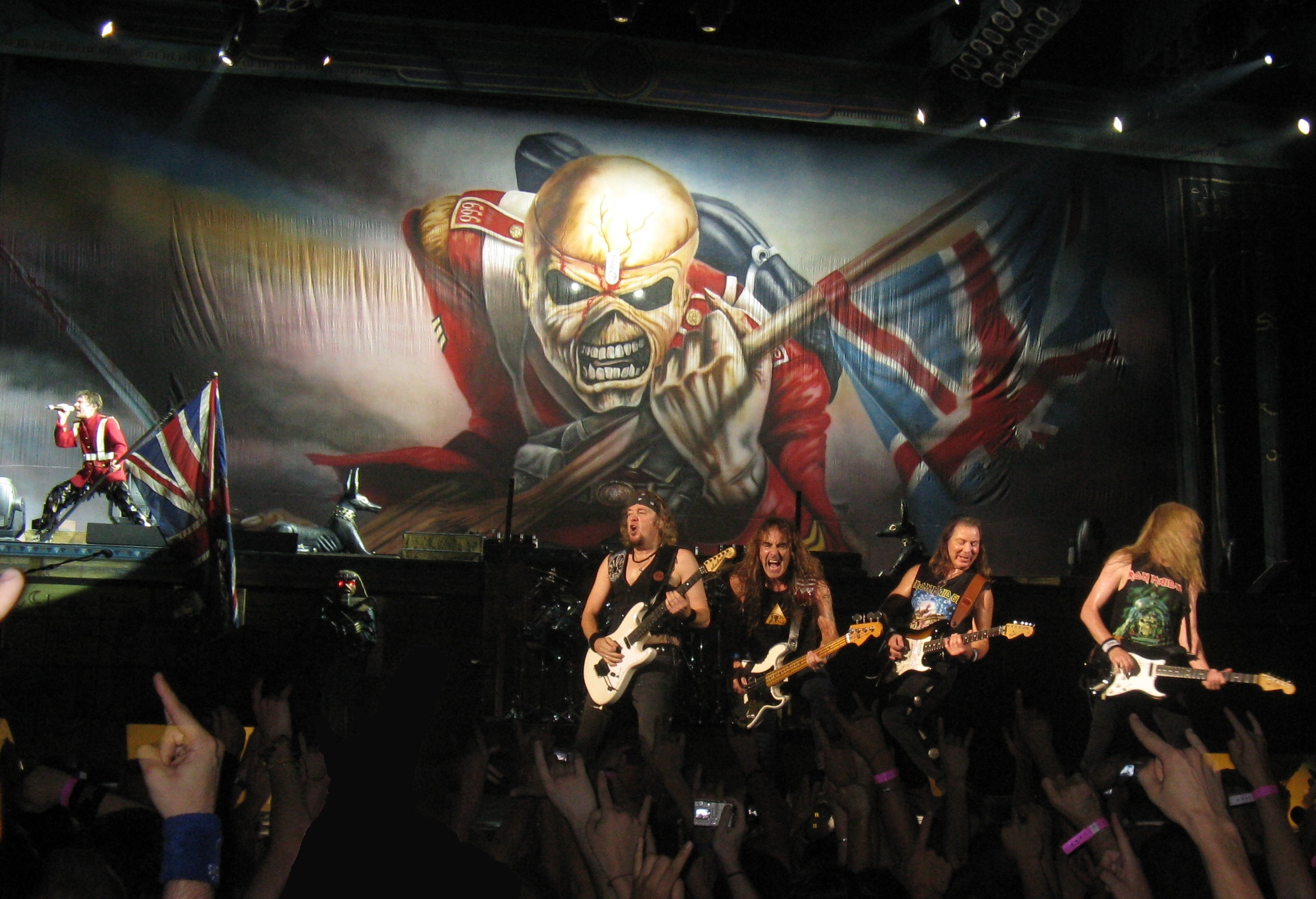
Iron Maiden were leaders of the new wave of British heavy metal

Although NWOBHM inspired many new bands, in the late 1980s much of the creative impetus in the genre shifted towards America and continental Europe (particularly Germany and Scandinavia), which produced most of the major new subgenres of metal, which were then taken up by British acts. These included thrash metal and death metal, both developed in the USA; black metal and power metal, both developed in continental Europe, but influenced by the British band Venom; and doom, which was developed in the USA but which soon had a number of bands from England, including Pagan Altar and Witchfinder General. There's also a large British influence in the doom/gothic metal scene, pioneered by such bands as Paradise Lost, My Dying Bride and Anathema. Grindcore, or simply grind, was a hybrid of death metal and hardcore punk, characterized by heavily distorted, down-tuned guitars, high speed tempo, blast beats, songs often lasting no more than two minutes (some are seconds long), and vocals which consist of growls and high-pitched screams. Pioneers, the British band Napalm Death inspired other British grindcore groups in the 1980s, among them Extreme Noise Terror, Carcass and Sore Throat.

Probably the most successful British metal band since the days of NWOBHM were Cradle of Filth, formed in 1991, and pursuing a form of extreme metal that is difficult to categorise. The term "retro-metal" has been applied to such bands as The Darkness, whose mix of glam rock and heavy riffs earned them a string of singles hits and a quintuple platinum album with One Way Ticket to Hell... and Back (2005), which reached number 11 in the UK charts. Bullet for My Valentine, from Wales, broke into the top 5 in both the U.S. and British charts with their metalcore, a mixture of metal and hardcore, with Scream Aim Fire (2008).

== Proto-punk, punk and new wave ==
=== Pub rock ===
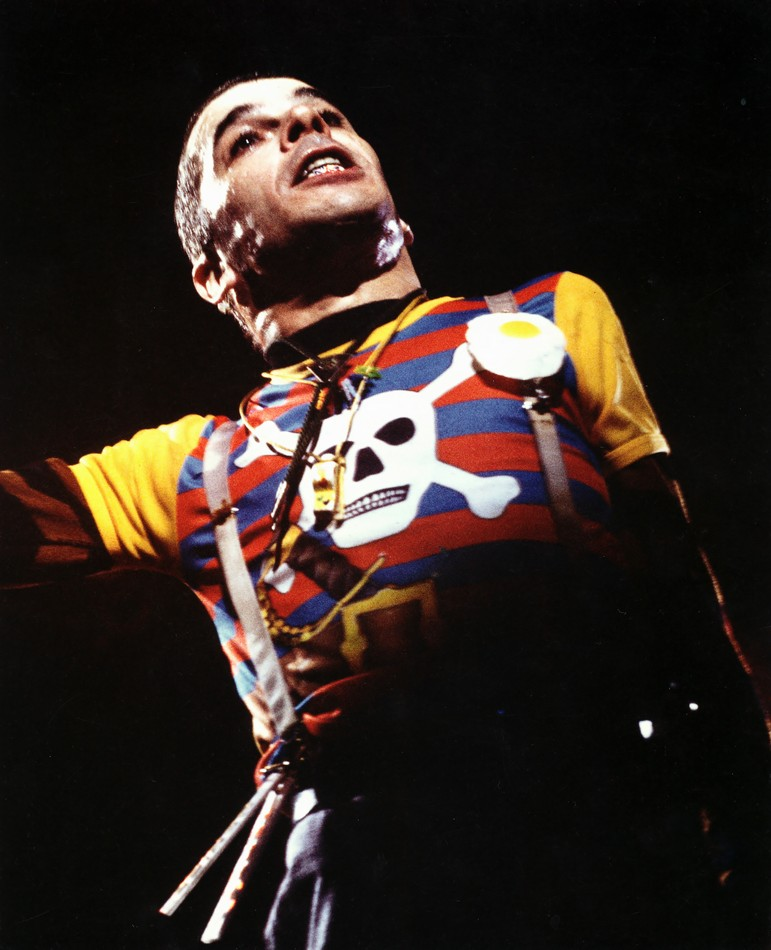
Ian Dury. Former member of Kilburn and the High Roads.

Pub rock was a short-lived trend that left a lasting influence on the British music scene, especially in punk rock. It was a back-to-basics movement that reacted against the glittery glam rock of David Bowie and Gary Glitter, and peaked in the mid-1970s. Pub rock developed in large north London pubs. It is said to have begun in May 1971 with Eggs over Easy, an American band, playing in the Tally Ho! in Kentish Town. A group of musicians who had been playing in blues and R&B bands during the 1960s and early '70s soon formed influential bands like Brinsley Schwarz, Ducks Deluxe and Bees Make Honey. Brinsley Schwarz was probably the most influential group, achieving some mainstream success both in the UK and in the States. The second wave of pub rock included Kilburn and the High Roads, Ace, Johnny Kid & the Pirates, and Chilli Willi and the Red Hot Peppers; these were followed by the third and final wave of pub rock, including Dr. Feelgood, and Sniff 'n' the Tears. Several pub rock musicians joined the new wave acts such as Graham Parker's backing band, The Rumour, Elvis Costello & the Attractions and even The Clash.

=== Punk rock ===
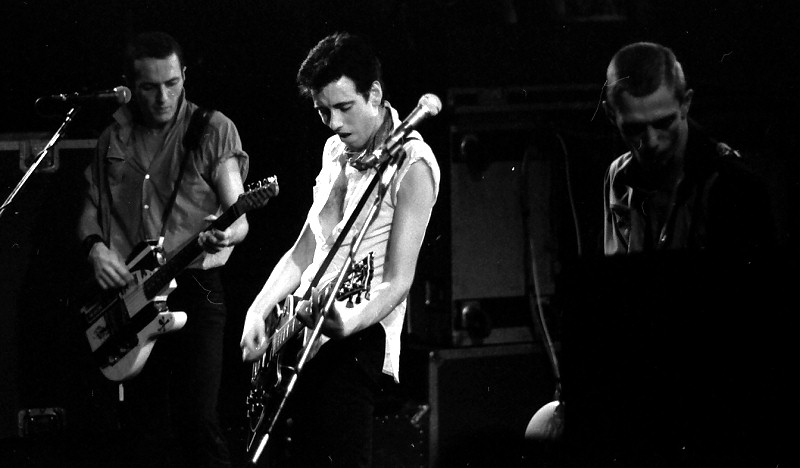
The Clash performing in 1980.

Punk rock developed between 1974 and 1976, originally in the United States, where it was rooted in garage rock, and other forms of what is now known as protopunk music. The first punk band is usually thought to be the Ramones from 1976. This was taken up in Britain by bands also influenced by the pub rock scene, like the Sex Pistols, The Clash and The Damned, particularly in London, who became the vanguard of a new musical and cultural movement, blending simple aggressive sounds and lyrics with clothing styles and a variety of anti-authoritarian ideologies. Punk rock bands eschewed the perceived excesses of mainstream 1970s rock, creating fast, hard-edged music, typically with short songs, stripped-down instrumentation, and often political, anti-establishment lyrics. Punk embraced a DIY (do it yourself) ethic, with many bands self-producing their recordings and distributing them through informal channels. 1977 saw punk rock spreading around the world, and it became a major international cultural phenomenon. However, by 1978, the initial impulse had subsided and punk had morphed into the wider and more diverse new wave and post-punk movements.

=== New wave ===
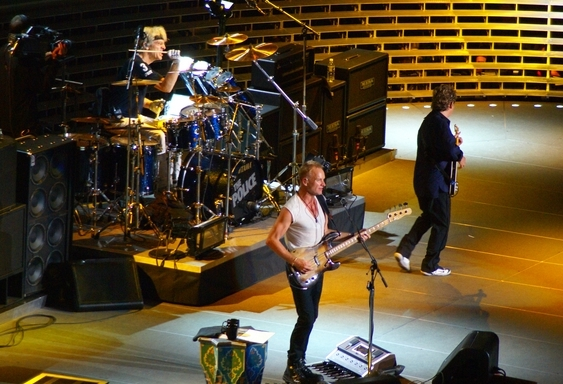
The Police (pictured in 2007) had a string of UK number one albums

As the initial punk impulse began to subside, with the major punk bands either disbanding or taking on new influences, the term "New Wave" began to be used to describe particularly British bands that emerged in the later 1970s with mainstream appeal. These included pop bands like XTC, Squeeze and Nick Lowe, the electronic rock of Gary Numan as well as songwriters like Elvis Costello, rock & roll influenced bands like the Pretenders, the reggae influenced music of bands like The Police, as well as bands of the mod revival like The Jam and of the ska revival like The Specials and Madness. By the end of the decade many of these bands, most obviously the Police, were beginning to make an impact in American and world markets.

=== Post-punk ===
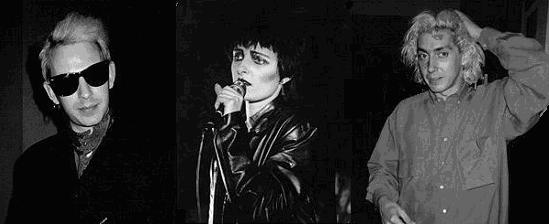
Post-punk pioneers Siouxsie and the Banshees, from left to right, Steven Severin, Siouxsie Sioux and Budgie.

Beside the development of mainstream new wave, there were also less commercial, darker acts, classified as post-punk. Like new wave they incorporated a range of influences, including glam rock, krautrock, electronic music, Jamaican dub music (specifically in bass guitar), and American funk. Examples of early British post-punk were Siouxsie and the Banshees, Wire, Magazine and Public Image Ltd. The other outfits that arrived on the British scene were per chronological order, Joy Division, the Cure, the Fall, Echo & the Bunnymen, Gang of Four, Bauhaus, Tubeway Army, Orange Juice, the Psychedelic Furs, Television Personalities, the Lords of the New Church, Killing Joke, the Smiths and the Jesus and Mary Chain. Post-punk would be a major element in subsequent gothic and alternative rock genres.

=== 2 tone ===
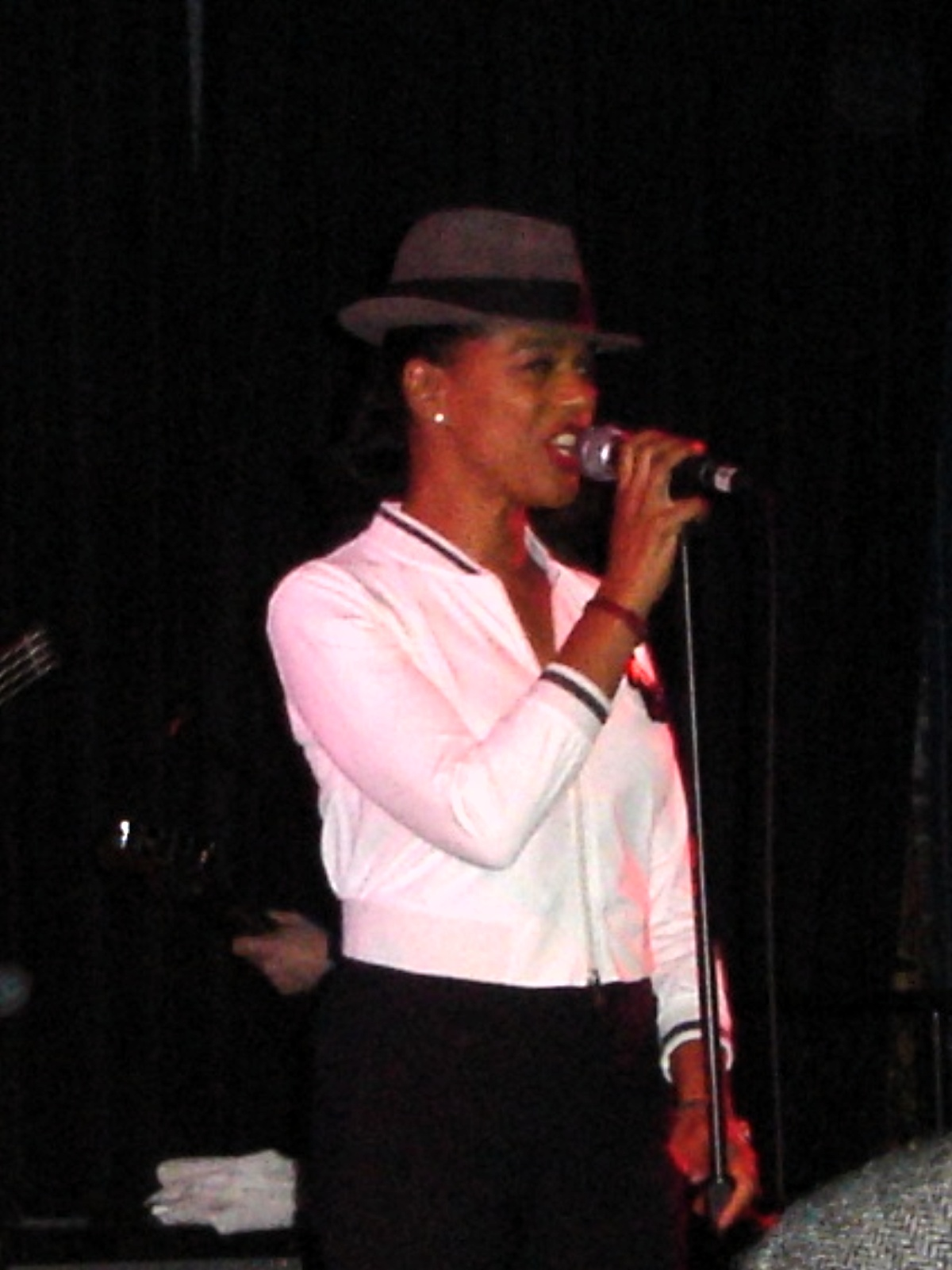
Pauline Black, vocalist of 2 tone ska revival band The Selecter

Two-tone or 2 tone is a genre of British popular music of the late 1970s and early 1980s that focused traditional Jamaican ska, rocksteady and reggae music with elements of punk rock and new wave music. Its name derives from 2 Tone Records, a record label founded in 1979 by Jerry Dammers of the Specials, and references a desire to transcend and defuse racial tensions in Thatcher-era Britain: many two-tone groups, such as the Specials, the Selecter and the Beat, featured a mix of black, white, and multiracial people. Originating in the Midlands city Coventry in England in the late 1970s, it was part of the second wave of ska music, following on from the first ska music that developed in Jamaica in the 1950s and 1960s, and infused with punk and new wave textures.

=== Folk punk ===
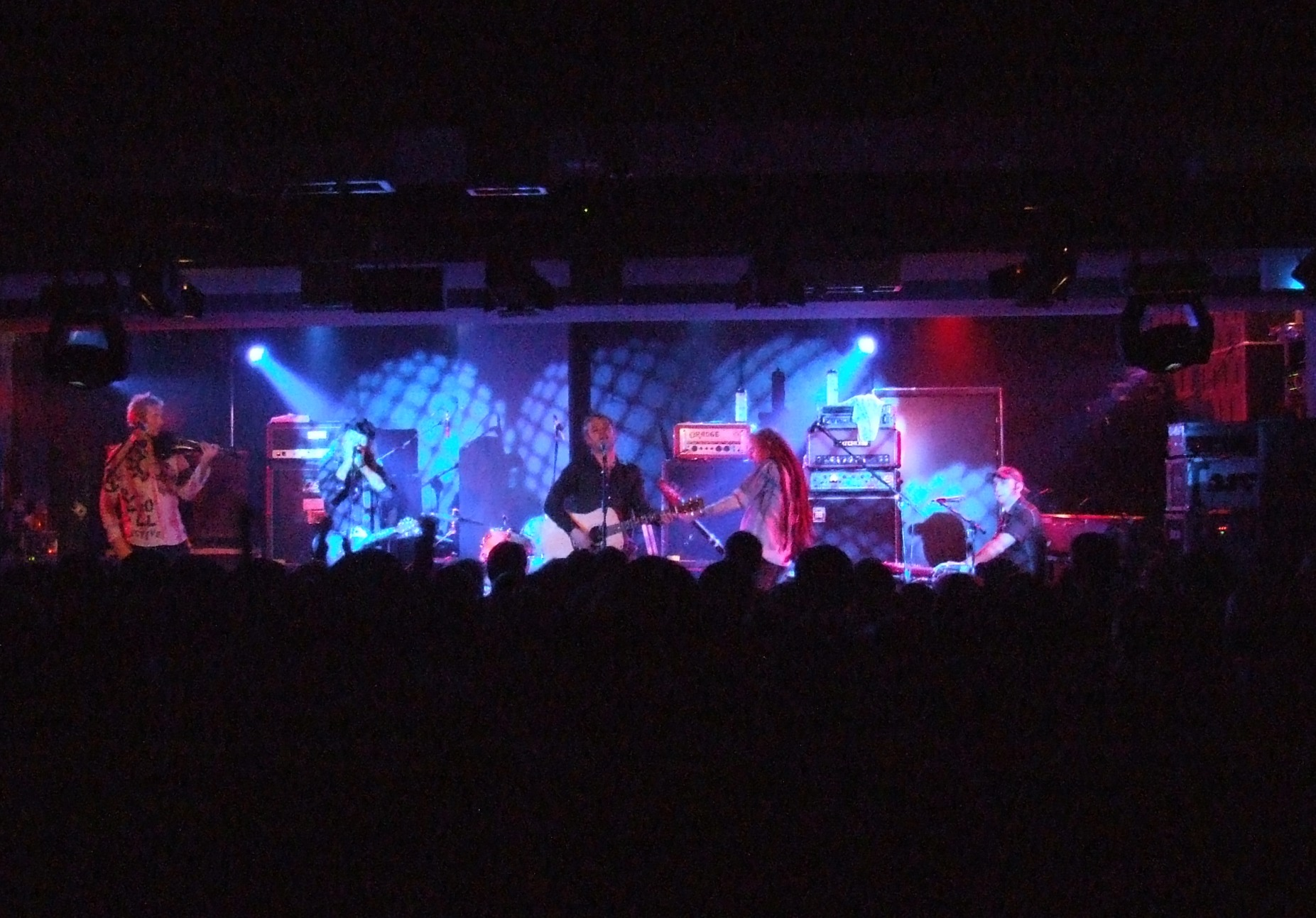
The Levellers in Prague, 2006

Folk punk or rogue folk is a fusion of folk music and punk rock, or occasionally other genres, which was pioneered by the London-based band The Pogues in the 1980s. It achieved some mainstream success in the 1980s and, particularly as the subgenre of Celtic punk, has been widely adopted in areas of the Celtic diaspora in North America and Australia and by many bands in continental central and eastern Europe. Unlike earlier Celtic rock and electric folk groups, folk punk groups tend to include relatively little traditional music in their repertoire, but instead usually performed their own compositions, often following the form of punk rock, using additional folk instrumentation, including, mandolin, accordion, banjo and particularly violin. Other bands adopted some traditional forms of music, including sea shanties and eastern European gypsy music. Among the most successful performers were The Men They Couldn't Hang, New Model Army, Oysterband, The Levellers, and singer-songwriter Billy Bragg, who enjoyed a series of hits in the 1980s.

== Electronic rock in the early 1980s ==
=== Synth rock ===
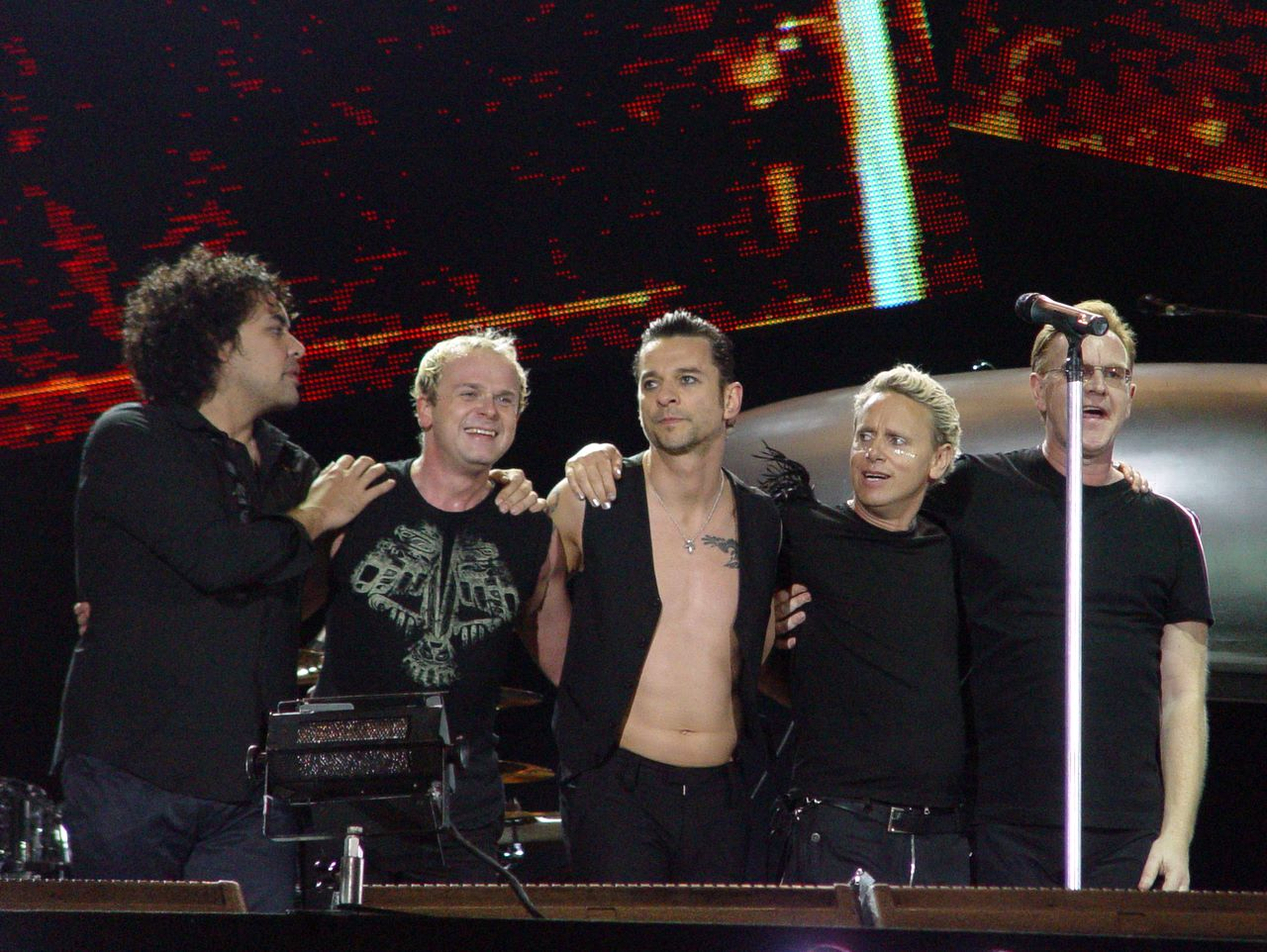
Depeche Mode in concert, 2006

Many progressive rock bands had incorporated synthesizers into their sound, including Pink Floyd, Yes and Genesis. In 1977, Ultravox member Warren Cann purchased a Roland TR-77 drum machine, which was first featured in their October 1977 single release "Hiroshima Mon Amour". The ballad arrangement, metronome-like percussion and heavy use of the ARP Odyssey synthesizer was effectively a prototype for nearly all synthpop and rock bands that were to follow. In 1978, the first incarnation of The Human League released their début single "Being Boiled". Others were soon to follow, including Tubeway Army, a little known outfit from West London, who dropped their punk rock image and jumped on the band wagon, topping the UK charts in the summer of 1979 with the single "Are Friends Electric?". This prompted the singer, Gary Numan to go solo and in the same year he release the Kraftwerk inspired album, The Pleasure Principle and again topped the charts for the second time with the single "Cars". Particularly through its adoption by New Romantics, synthesizers came to dominate the pop and rock music of the early 80s. Albums such as Visage's Visage (1980), John Foxx's Metamatic (1980), Gary Numan's Telekon (1980), Ultravox's Vienna (1980), The Human League's Dare (1981) and Depeche Mode's Speak & Spell (1981), established a sound that influenced most mainstream pop and rock bands, until it began to fall from popularity in the mid-1980s.

=== New Romantics ===
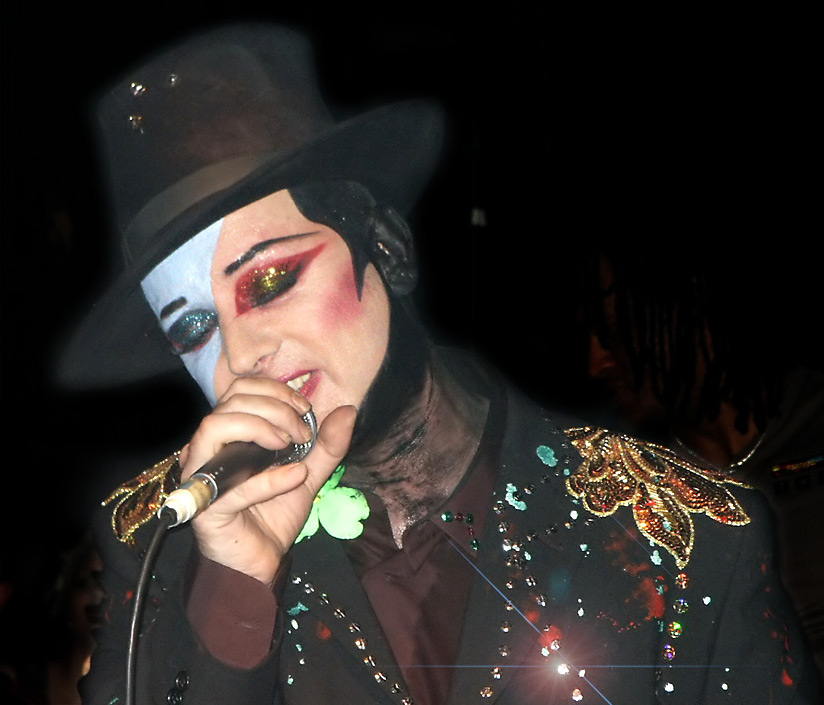
Boy George, lead singer of Culture Club, performing at Ronnie Scott's Jazz Club in London

New Romantic emerged as part of the new wave music movement in London nightclubs including Billy's and The Blitz Club towards the end of the 1970s. Influenced by David Bowie and Roxy Music, it developed glam rock fashions, gaining its name from the frilly fop shirts of early Romanticism. New Romantic music often made extensive use of synthesizers. Pioneers included Visage, Japan and Ultravox and among the commercially most successful acts associated with the movement were Adam and the Ants, Culture Club, The Human League, Spandau Ballet and Duran Duran. By about 1983 the original movement had dissolved, with surviving acts dropping most of the fashion elements to pursue mainstream careers.

=== The second British invasion ===
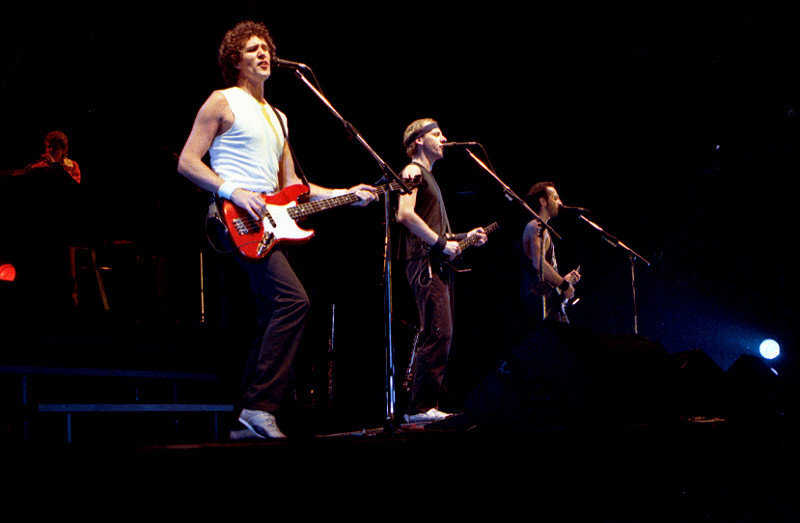
Dire Straits Playing in Norway in October 1985

From its inception in 1981, the cable music channel MTV featured a disproportionate amount of music videos from image conscious British acts. British acts, who had been accustomed to using music videos for half a decade, featured heavily on the channel. The Buggles' "Video Killed the Radio Star" was the first music video shown on MTV. In late 1982, "I Ran (So Far Away)" by A Flock of Seagulls entered the Billboard Top Ten, arguably the first successful song that owed almost everything to video. They would be followed by bands like Duran Duran whose glossy videos would come to symbolise the power of MTV. Dire Straits' "Money for Nothing" gently poked fun at MTV which had helped make them international rock stars. In 1983, 30% of the record sales were from British acts. 18 of the Top 40 and 6 of the Top 10 singles on 18 July were by British artists. Overall record sales would rise by 10% from 1982. Newsweek featured Annie Lennox of Eurythmics and Boy George of Culture Club on the cover of one of its issues, while Rolling Stone would release an "England Swings" issue. In April 1984, 40 of the Top 100 singles were from British acts while 8 of the Top 10 singles in a May 1985 survey were of British origin. Veteran music journalist Simon Reynolds theorised that similar to the first British Invasion the use of black American influences by the British acts helped to spur success. Commentators in the mainstream media credited MTV and the British acts with bringing colour and energy back to pop music while rock journalists were generally hostile to the phenomenon because they felt it represented image over content.

== Oi!, street punk and punk/metal hybrids ==
=== Oi! and street punk ===
Oi! is a subgenre of punk rock that originated in the United Kingdom in the late 1970s. The music and its associated subculture had the goal of bringing together punks, skinheads, and other disaffected working-class youth. The movement was partly a response to the perception that many participants in the early punk rock scene were, in the words of The Business guitarist Steve Kent, "trendy university people using long words, trying to be artistic... and losing touch." First-generation Oi! bands such as Sham 69 and Cock Sparrer were around for years before the word Oi! was used retroactively to describe their style of music. In 1980, writing in Sounds magazine, rock journalist Garry Bushell labelled the movement Oi!, taking the name from the garbled "Oi!" that Stinky Turner of Cockney Rejects used to introduce the band's songs. The word is a British expression meaning hey or hey there! In addition to Cockney Rejects, other bands to be explicitly labeled Oi! in the early days of the genre included Angelic Upstarts, the 4-Skins, the Business, Anti-Establishment, Blitz, the Blood and Combat 84.

A related scene was street punk which emerged from the style of Oi! and hardcore punk bands. A key band in defining the aesthetic was the Exploited. The three most prominent UK82 bands, according to Ian Glasper, are the Exploited, Discharge, and GBH. Street punks generally have a much more ostentatious and flamboyant appearance than the working class or skinhead image cultivated by many Oi! groups. Lyrics frequently denounced the Conservative leader Margaret Thatcher in the same way that American hardcore punk bands addressed the Ronald Reagan administration.

=== Crust punk and grindcore ===
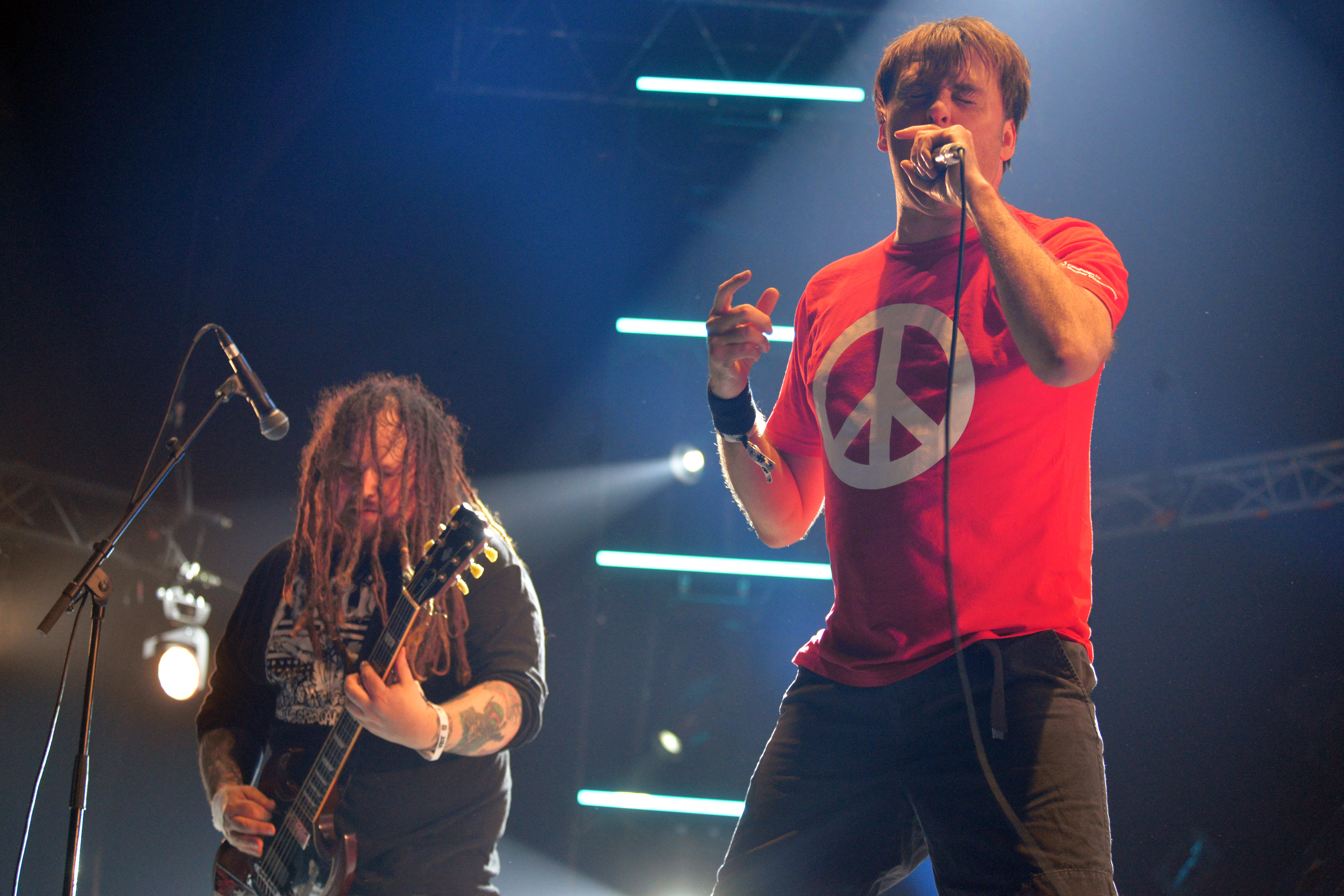
Napalm Death, pioneers of grindcore

In the second half of the 1980s, it became increasingly normalised for UK hardcore bands to be influenced by heavy metal styles. Crust punk is a form of music influenced by punk rock and extreme metal. Founded by the English bands Amebix and Antisect, taking its name from Newcastle band Hellbastard's 1986 Ripper Crust demo. Crust punk influenced further developments into UK hardcore, specifically in its contribution to the creation of grindcore. Grindcore, developed during the mid-1980s in the United Kingdom by Napalm Death, a group who emerged from the anarcho-punk scene in Birmingham, England. Napalm Death's seismic impact inspired other British grindcore groups in the 1980s, among them Carcass and Sore Throat. Extreme Noise Terror, from Ipswich, formed in 1984 with the goal of becoming "the most extreme hardcore punk band of all time," the group took Mick Harris from Napalm Death in 1987. Ian Glasper describes the group as "pissed-off hateful noise with its roots somewhere between early Discharge and Disorder, with [vocalists] Dean [Jones] and Phil [Vane] pushing their trademark vocal extremity to its absolute limit."

== Indie rock ==
Indie or independent rock, particularly in America often known as alternative rock, was a scene that emerged from post-punk and new wave in the 1980s, eschewing the major record labels for control of their own music and relying on local scenes or national sub-cultures to provide an audience. Having enjoyed some success a number of indie acts were able to move into the mainstream, including early indie bands Aztec Camera, Orange Juice and The Smiths, followed by The Housemartins and James. Other forms of alternative rock developed in the UK during the 1980s. The Jesus and Mary Chain wrapped their pop melodies in walls of guitar noise, while New Order emerged from the demise of post-punk band Joy Division and experimented with techno and house music, forging the alternative dance style. The Mary Chain, along with Dinosaur Jr and the dream pop of Cocteau Twins, were the influences for the shoegazing movement of the late 1980s.

=== Gothic rock ===
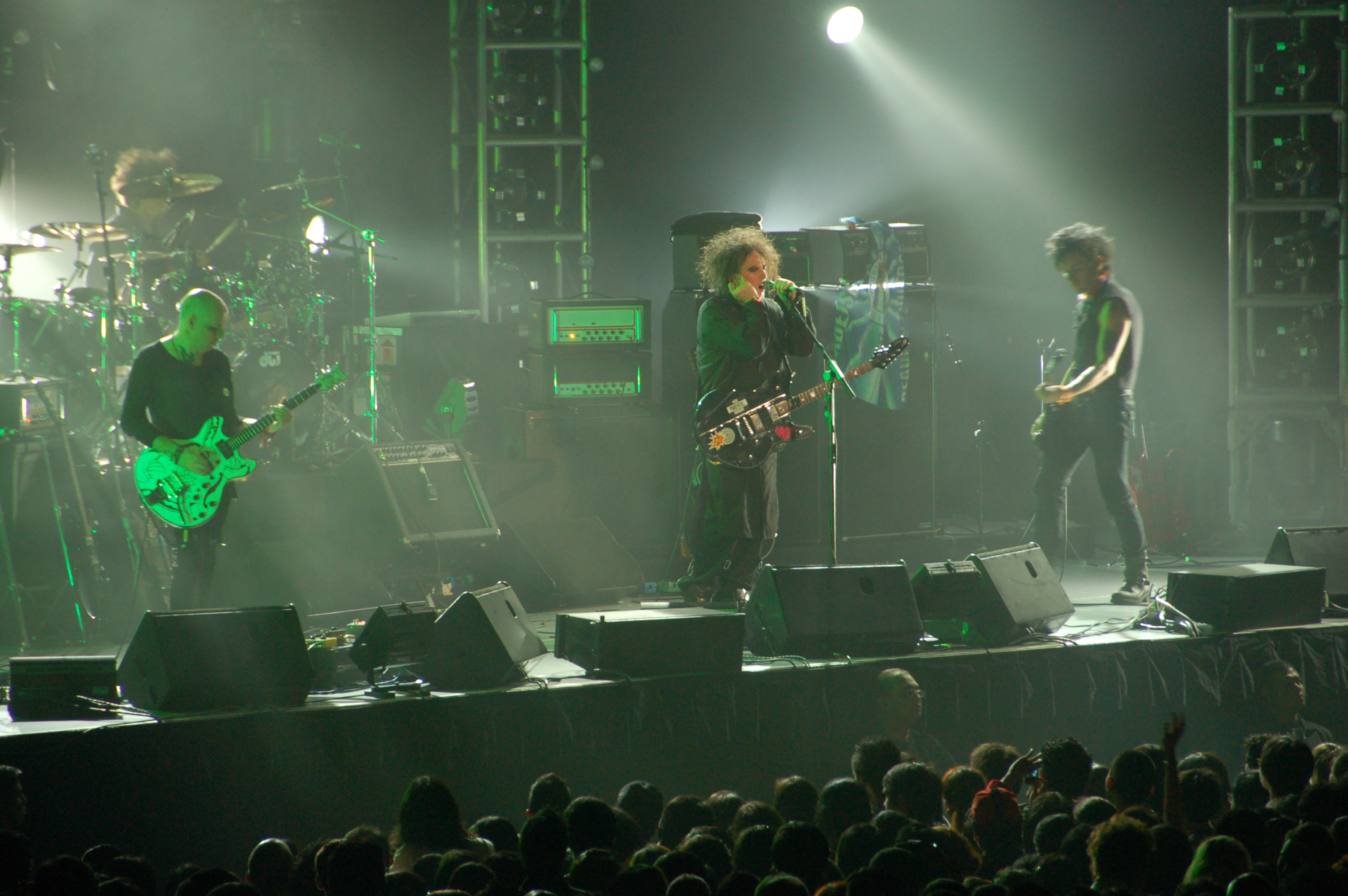
The Cure on stage in 2007

Gothic rock, often shortened to goth, developed out of the post-punk scene in the later 1970s. It combines dark, often keyboard-heavy music with introspective and depressing lyrics. Notable early gothic rock bands include Siouxsie and the Banshees, Joy Division, Bauhaus (whose "Bela Lugosi's Dead" is often cited as the first goth record), the Cure, the Sisters of Mercy and Fields of the Nephilim. Gothic rock gave rise to a broader goth subculture that included clubs, various fashion trends and numerous publications that grew in popularity in the 1980s, gaining notoriety by being associated with several moral panics over suicide and Satanism.

=== Madchester ===
The independent rock scene that had developed in Manchester in the second half of the 1980s, based in The Haçienda nightclub and Factory Records and dubbed Madchester, came to national prominence at the end of the decade, with the Happy Mondays, the Inspiral Carpets, and Stone Roses charting late in 1989. The scene became the centre of media attention for independent rock in the early 1990s, with bands like World of Twist, New Fast Automatic Daffodils, The High, Northside, Paris Angels, and Intastella also gaining national attention. The period of dominance was relatively short lived with The Stone Roses beginning to retreat from public performance while engaged in contractual disputes, the Happy Mondays having difficulty in producing a second album and Factory Records going bankrupt in 1992. Local bands catching the tail-end of Madchester, such as The Mock Turtles, became part of a wider baggy scene. The music press in the UK began to place more focus on shoegazing bands from the south of England and bands emerging through US grunge.

=== Dream pop and shoegazing ===
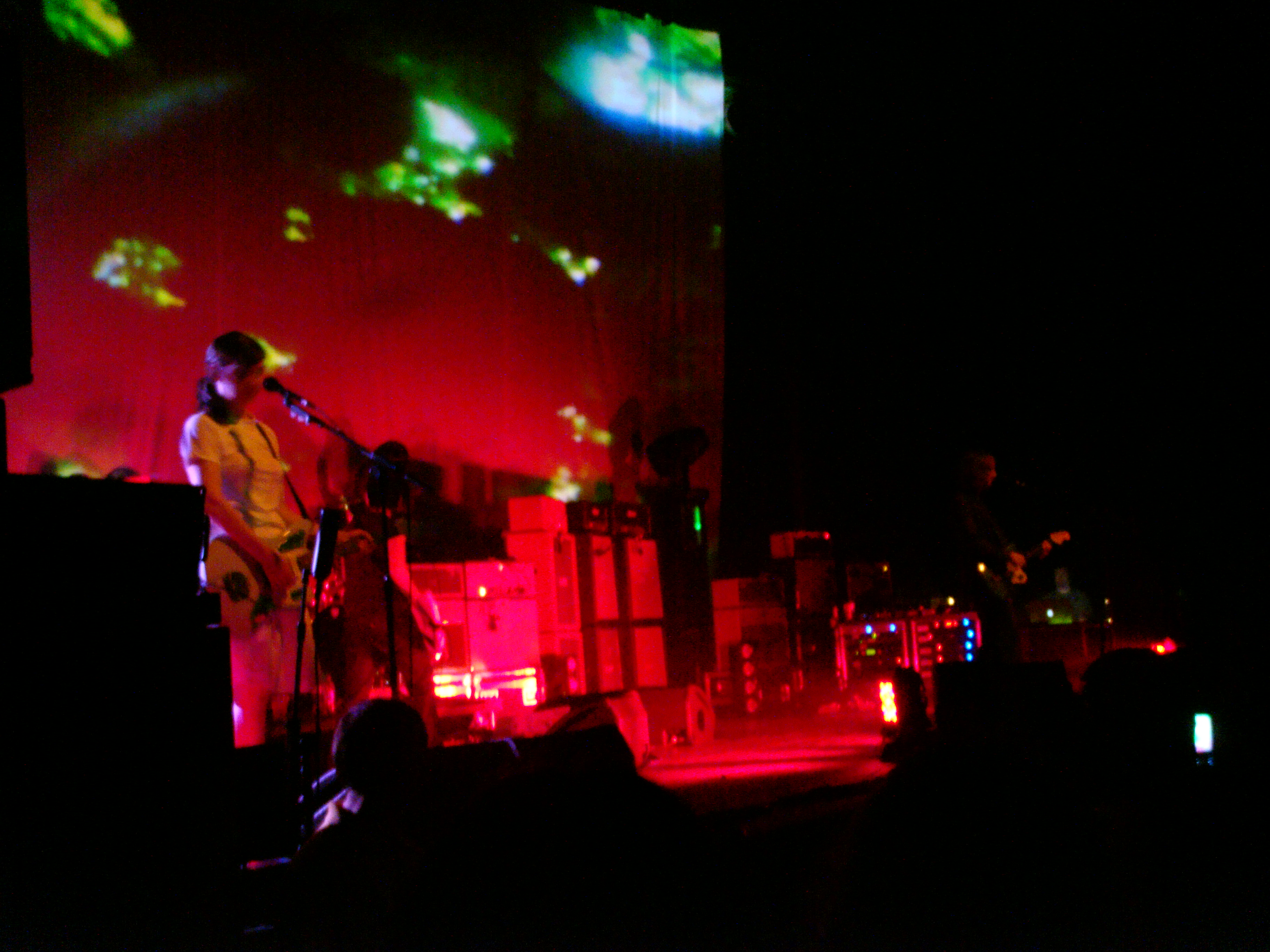
My Bloody Valentine, 2008.

Dream pop had developed out of the indie rock scene of the 1980s, when bands like Cocteau Twins, The Chameleons, The Passions, Dif Juz, Lowlife and A.R. Kane began fusing post-punk and ethereal experiments with bittersweet pop melodies into sensual, sonically ambitious soundscapes. The 4AD record label is the one most associated with dream pop, though others such as Creation, Projekt, Fontana, Bedazzled, Vernon Yard, and Slumberland also released significant records in the genre. A louder, more aggressive strain of dream pop came to be known as shoegazing; key bands of this style were Lush, Slowdive, My Bloody Valentine, Ride, Chapterhouse, Curve and Levitation. These bands kept the atmospheric qualities of dream pop, but added the intensity of post-punk-influenced bands such as The Chameleons and Sonic Youth.

=== Post-rock ===
Post-rock originated in the release of Talk Talk's album Laughing Stock and US band Slint's Spiderland, both in 1991, which produced experimental work influenced by sources as varied as electronica, jazz, and minimalist classical music, often abandoning the traditional song format in favour of instrumental and ambient music. The term was first used to describe the band Bark Psychosis and their album Hex (1994), but was soon employed for bands such as Stereolab, Laika, Disco Inferno and Pram and other acts in America and Canada. Scottish group Mogwai are one of the influential post-rock groups to arise at the turn of the 21st century.

=== Indie pop ===
Initially dubbed as 'C86' after the 1986 NME tape, and also known as "cutie", "shambling bands" and later as "twee pop", indie pop was characterised by jangling guitars, a love of sixties pop and often fey, innocent lyrics. It was also inspired by the DIY scene of punk and there was a thriving fanzine, label and club and gig circuit. Early bands included The Pastels, The Shop Assistants and Primal Scream. Scenes later developed in the United States particularly around labels such as K Records. Genres such as Riot Grrrl and bands as diverse as Nirvana, Manic Street Preachers, and Belle and Sebastian have all acknowledged its influence.

=== Britpop and Britrock ===
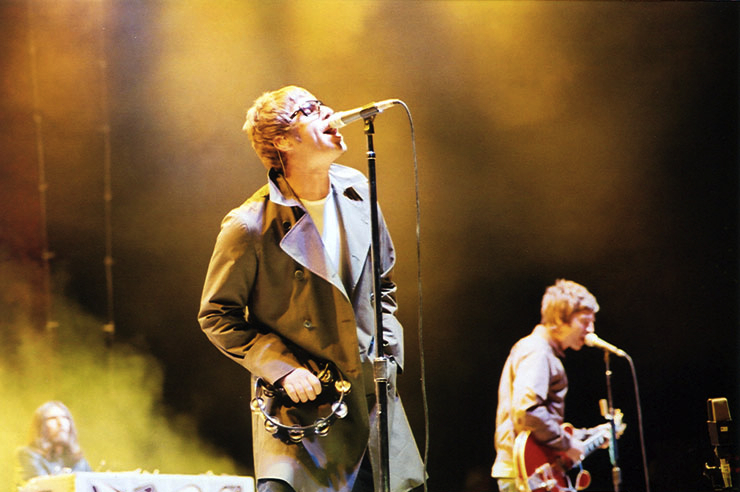
Oasis performing in 2005.

Britpop emerged from the British independent music scene of the early 1990s and was characterised by bands influenced by British guitar pop music of the 1960s and 1970s. The movement developed as a reaction against various musical and cultural trends in the late 1980s and early 1990s, particularly the grunge phenomenon from the United States. New British groups such as Suede and Blur launched the movement by positioning themselves as opposing musical forces, referencing British guitar music of the past and writing about uniquely British topics and concerns. These bands were soon joined by others including Oasis, Pulp, Supergrass, The Boo Radleys, Kula Shaker, Ash, Ocean Colour Scene and Elastica. Other bands with a heavier sound were sometimes referred to by the sobriquet 'Britrock', including Skunk Anansie, The Wildhearts, Terrorvision, Reef, and Feeder. Britpop and Britrock groups brought British alternative rock into the mainstream and formed the backbone of a larger British cultural movement called Cool Britannia. Although its more popular bands were able to spread their commercial success overseas, especially to the United States, the movement largely fell apart by the end of the decade.

=== Post-Britpop ===
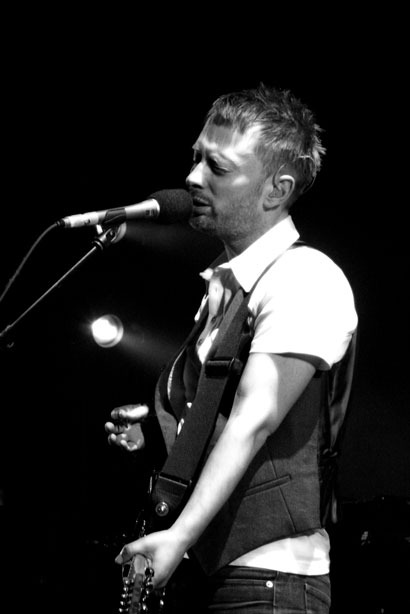
Thom Yorke of Radiohead.

From about 1997, as dissatisfaction grew with the concept of Cool Britannia, and Britpop as a movement began to dissolve, emerging bands began to avoid the Britpop label while still producing music derived from it. Many of these bands tended to mix elements of British traditional rock (or British trad rock), with American influences, including grunge. Radiohead, Placebo and Post-Britpop bands like The Verve, Travis, Stereophonics, Feeder, and particularly Coldplay, achieved much wider international success than most of the Britpop groups that had preceded them, and were some of the most commercially successful acts of the late 1990s and early 2000s.

=== Garage rock revival and post-punk revival ===
In the 2000s British indie rock experienced a resurgence. Like modern American alternative rock, many British indie bands such as Franz Ferdinand, The Libertines and Bloc Party drew influences from post-punk groups such as Joy Division, Wire, and Gang of Four. Other prominent independent rock bands in the 2000s include: Editors, The Fratellis, Lostprophets, Razorlight, Keane, Kaiser Chiefs, Muse, Kasabian, The Cribs, The Maccabees, The Kooks and Arctic Monkeys (the last being the most prominent act to gain their initial fan base through the use of internet social networking).

=== Hardcore, post-hardcore and metalcore ===
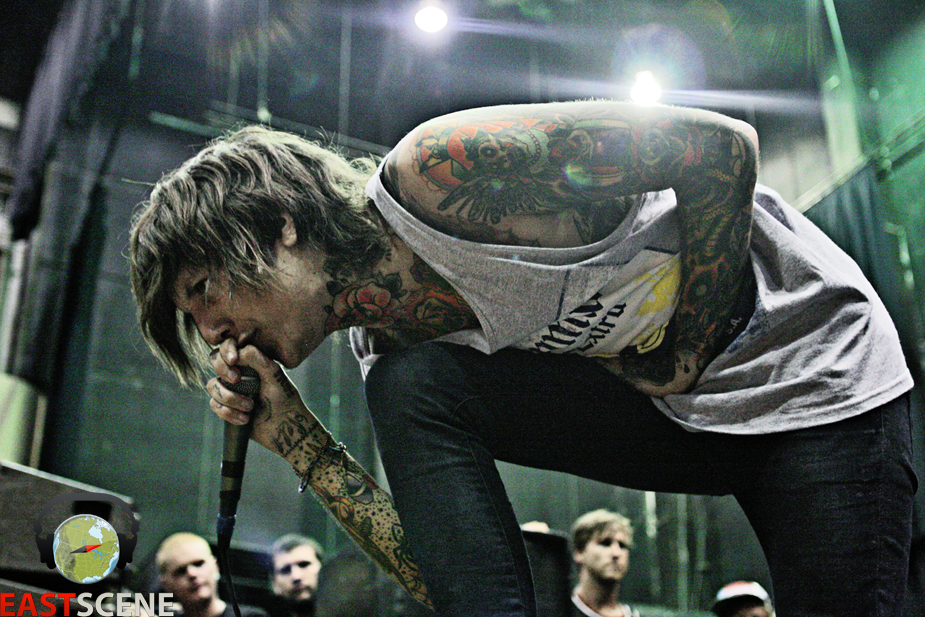
Sheffield's Bring Me the Horizon began as a metalcore band in the 2000s to adopt a more eclectic style in the 2010s

In 1996, a hardcore scene in London began around the informal collective "London Black-Up", which include bands like Knuckledust, Ninebar and Bun Dem Out. Bands in this scene often incorporated elements of grime, hip hop and metal into their sounds and was based around venues such as the Camden Underworld, New Cross Inn and the Dome in Tufnell Park. The 2000s saw the rise in prominent of a number of UK post-hardcore bands, the most prominent of which was Bridgend's Funeral for a Friend, whose 2003 debut album Casually Dressed & Deep in Conversation peaked at number 12 on the UK singles chart. In March 2007, Gallows signed a deal with Warner Bros Records, making them the first British hardcore punk band to sign to a major label. The success of Gallows led to other British hardcore acts of the time gain notability like the Ghost of a Thousand, Heights, Dead Swans and Blackhole. The late-2000s metalcore scene was fronted by Architects and Bring Me the Horizon. The style of Bring Me the Horizon's early work, including their debut album Count Your Blessings, has been described primarily as deathcore, but over the course of several albums, the band has shifted its style and moved in a more melodically oriented direction by combining their approach to metalcore with elements of electronica, pop and hip hop. Asking Alexandria from York were the most successful bands to originate from the MySpace metalcore scene.

=== New rave ===
With developments in computer technology and music software advanced, it became possible to create high quality music using little more than a single laptop computer. This resulted in a massive increase in the amount of home-produced electronic music available to the general public via the expanding internet, and new forms of performance such as laptronica and live coding. In Britain the combination of indie with American pioneered dance-punk was dubbed new rave in publicity for Klaxons and the term was picked up and applied by the NME to a number of bands, including Trash Fashion, New Young Pony Club, Hadouken!, Late of the Pier, Test Icicles, and Shitdisco forming a scene with a similar visual aesthetic to earlier raves.

=== The Windmill scene ===
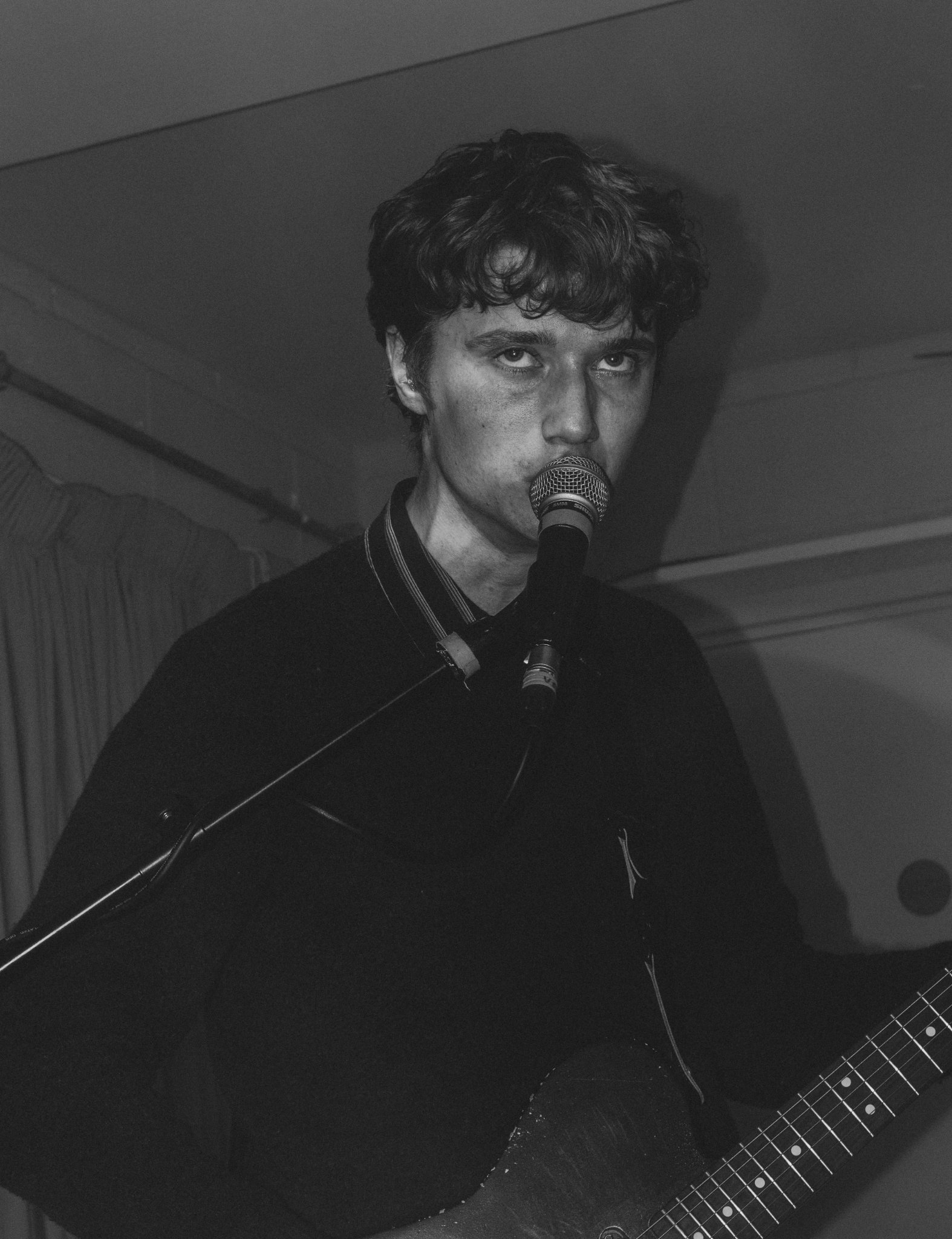
Former Black Country, New Road frontman Isaac Wood, performing in 2020

In the mid-to-late 2010s and early 2020s, a new wave of post-punk bands from England emerged. The groups in this scene have now identified as being part of the Windmill scene, due to their formation at the venue of the same name in Brixton. Described by NPR writer Matthew Perpetua in 2021 as "bands that kinda talk-sing over post-punk music, and sometimes it's more like post-rock." Many of the acts are associated with producer Dan Carey and his record label Speedy Wunderground, which have also earned it the title of "Speedy Scene", with other names including "crank wave" and "Post-Brexit New Wave" Artists that have been identified as part of the scene include Black Midi, Squid, Black Country, New Road, Dry Cleaning, Shame, Fontaines D.C., Yard Act. Described by the Ramapo College of New Jersey's Ramapo News in 2025 as "easily the most significant movement in rock music in the past decade", Windmill scene bands have achieved important commercial success, with Black Country, New Road's Ants From Up There album debuting at No. 3 on the UK Albums Chart.

== See also ==
- List of British Invasion artists
- Music of the United Kingdom (1950s)
- Music of the United Kingdom (1960s)
- Music of the United Kingdom (1970s)
- Music of the United Kingdom (1980s)
- Music of the United Kingdom (1990s)
- Music of the United Kingdom (2000s)
- Swinging London
