= List of pub rock bands =

This is a list of pub rock bands.

== Australian pub rock groups ==
- AC/DC
- Airbourne (band)
- Amyl and the Sniffers
- The Angels (Australian band)
- Australian Crawl
- Blackfeather
- The Blacklist (band)
- Buffalo (band)
- The Choirboys (band)
- The Cockroaches
- Cold Chisel
- Cosmic Psychos
- Daddy Cool (band)
- The Dingoes
- Divinyls
- Hell City Glamours
- Hoodoo Gurus
- Hunters & Collectors
- Icehouse (band)
- INXS
- Jet (band)
- The Johnnys
- The Living End
- Magic Dirt
- Mental As Anything
- Midnight Oil
- Noiseworks
- Painters and Dockers
- Pist Idiots
- The Radiators (Australian band)
- Radio Birdman
- Rancid Eddie
- Rose Tattoo
- The Screaming Jets
- Spy vs. Spy (band)
- Billy Thorpe and the Aztecs
- The Triffids
- You Am I
- The Zimmermen

== British pub rock groups ==
- The 101ers
- Ace (band)
- Bazooka Joe (band)
- Bees Make Honey (band)
- Brewers Droop
- Brinsley Schwarz
- Cado Belle
- Café Society (British band)
- Captains of Industry (band)
- Chilli Willi and the Red Hot Peppers
- Chubby and the Gang
- Clancy (band)
- The Count Bishops
- Dire Straits
- Dr. Feelgood (band)
- Ducks Deluxe
- Eddie and the Hot Rods
- Eight Rounds Rapid
- The Gorillas
- Help Yourself (band)
- The Inmates
- Kilburn and the High Roads
- Kokomo (band)
- The Kursaal Flyers
- The Motors
- Nine Below Zero
- The Pirates (band)
- Plummet Airlines
- Roogalator
- The Rumour
- Starry Eyed and Laughing
- The Stranglers

== Groups from other countries ==
- Eggs over Easy
- Roze Poze
- Saturday Saints
