= No Alternative (film) =

- Directed by: William Dickerson
- Screenplay by: William Dickerson, Dwight Moody
- Cinematography: Robert Kraetsch
- Edited by: Natasha Bedu
- Music by: MJ Mynarski
- Distributed by: Gravitas Ventures
- Release date: April 2, 2019
- Running time: 104 minutes
- Country: United States
- Language: English

No Alternative is a 2019 American independent drama film directed by William Dickerson, and written by Dickerson and Dwight Moody. The film is adapted from Dickerson's 2012 novel of the same name.

== Plot ==
Set in the mid-1990s in suburban New York, No Alternative follows the Harrison family as they cope with grief, identity, and rebellion in the wake of Kurt Cobain's death. Thomas Harrison, a high school senior, is determined to form his own grunge-inspired alternative rock band. Obsessed with recreating the music of the era, Thomas sees a local “battle of the bands” contest as his chance to break out and potentially secure a record deal. However, the pressure strains his friendships and threatens the authenticity of their music.

Meanwhile, his younger sister Bridget, a 15-year-old freshman with a history of misdiagnosed mental health issues and dependency on prescription drugs, rejects both her brother's music and the values of her suburban upbringing. Instead, she adopts the persona of “Bri Da B,” a gangsta rapper whose provocative lyrics shock her peers and community. Though her behavior is dismissed by Thomas as another sign of instability, Bridget's embrace of hip-hop serves as her means of self-expression and rebellion, making her in some ways more authentically “punk” than her brother.

As Thomas pursues conformity under the guise of nonconformity, Bridget's radical alter ego challenges the expectations placed on her by family and society. Both siblings struggle with their desire to escape the identities imposed on them, but their inability to fully recognize their shared need for reinvention leads to a painful and tragic rift.

== Production ==
The film is based on Dickerson's novel No Alternative (2012), published by Kettle of Letters Press. The novel, inspired by the director's relationship with his late sister Briana, explores themes of adolescence, music, and mental illness. After Briana's death in 2014, Dickerson began adapting the book into a screenplay.

Principal photography took place between October and November 2016 in Yonkers, New York and New York City. The climactic “Battle of the Bands” sequence was filmed at Garcia's, part of the Capitol Theatre in Port Chester, New York.

== Cast ==
- Michaela Cavazos as Bridget “Bri Da B” Harrison
- Conor Proft as Thomas Harrison
- Harry Hamlin as William Harrison
- Kathryn Erbe as Maureen Harrison
- Aria Shahghasemi as Elias Santoro
- Chloe Levine as Jackie O’Brien
- Matthew Van Oss as Jeremy Brewer
- Logan Georges as Stewart Boyle
- Lewis Arlt as Dr. Malcolm Brenner

== Themes ==
No Alternative explores the pop culture scene in the early 90s, and confronts hot button topics including suicide, depression, drug addiction, race and the teenage angst and alienation that were inextricably linked to the time. The specter of Kurt Cobain's suicide casts a shadow over this story, as it did over an entire generation in the early 90s. This generation was immersed in collective whirlpools of thought, aggression, freshly clipped nerve-endings, disaffection and the do-it-yourself zeitgeist of the moment. In the 20s, there was the Lost Generation, in the 50s, there was the Beat Generation, in the 90s, there was the Suicide Generation. It was a generation marked by alienation and teenagers sought an escape route. No Alternative seeks to destigmatize the struggle with mental illness.

== Reception ==
No Alternative received a largely positive critical response. The Los Angeles Times described it as “a remarkably assured and deeply felt grunge-era coming-of-age picture,” praising its authenticity and emotional depth. Film Threat lauded the film as “a rare indie gem that delivers solidly on all fronts with no missteps,” highlighting its performances and its ability to capture the 1990s youth zeitgeist. However, not all reviews were favorable. The Hollywood Reporter offered a more critical perspective, accusing director William Dickerson of “squeamish wish fulfillment” and interpreting the film's tragic depiction of suicide as “a sacrificial gesture meant to honor and immortalize his sister.”

== Music ==
The film incorporates songs by Dickerson's band Latterday Saints (now Saturday Saints), as well as raps written by Briana Dickerson under her persona “Bri Da B.” The soundtrack features tracks from 1990s artists including Mudhoney, Lisa Loeb, Superdrag, Failure, and Sebadoh. It was released as an official Record Store Day 2019 selection and won Best Soundtrack at the Paris Art and Movie Awards.
