= William Dickerson =

William Dickerson may be:

- William Dickerson (director), American film and television director
- William K. Dickerson (1872–1948), American harness racing driver and trainer
- William W. Dickerson (1851–1923), American politician
