= Saturday Saints =

American rock band

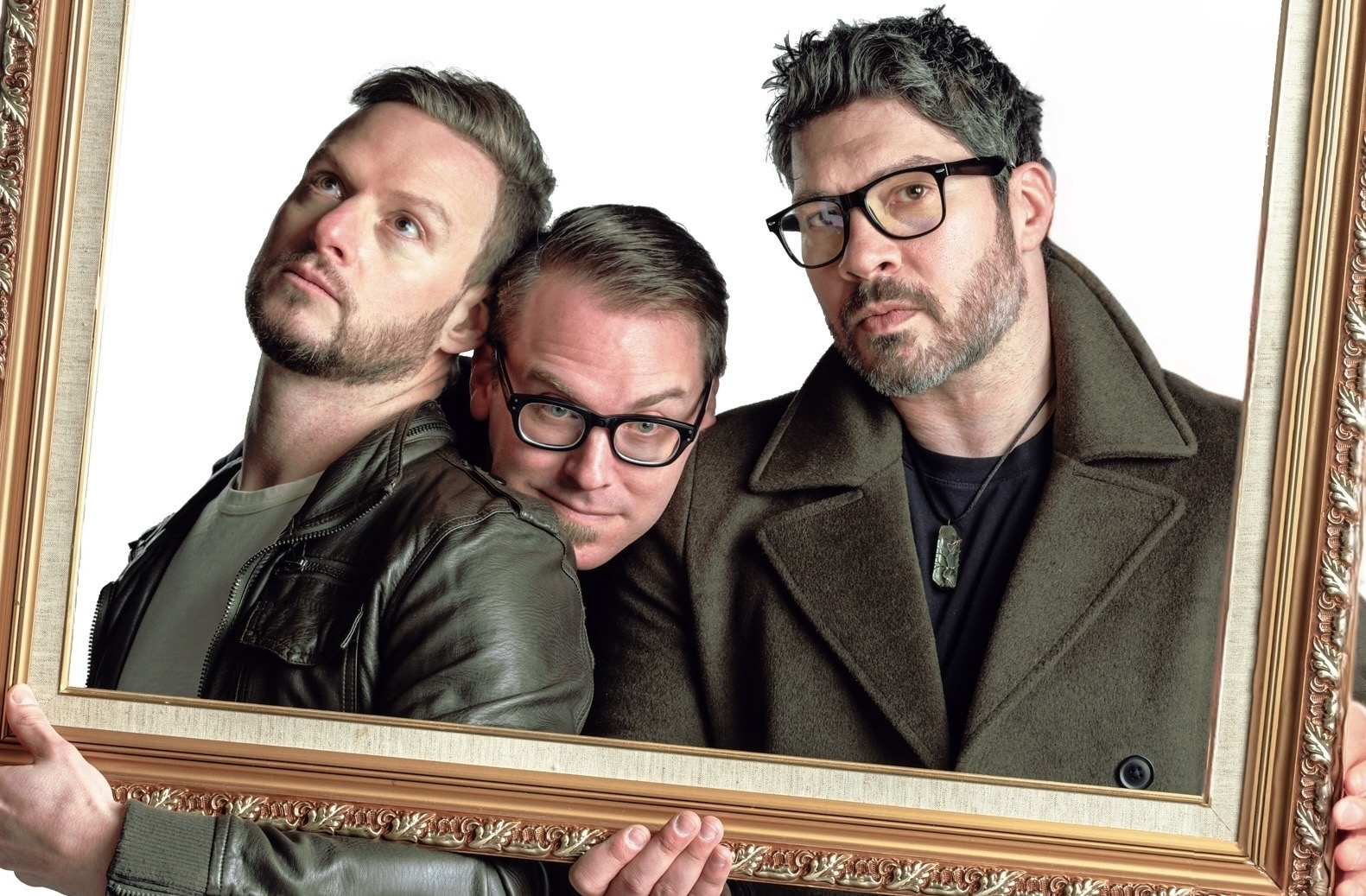
- Saturday Saints

Background information
- Origin: Yonkers, New York, United States
- Genres: Rock, Pub Rock, Grunge
- Years active: 1995–present
- Labels: Rhyme & Reason
- Members: Andreas Burgos, Liam McKiernan, William Dickerson

Saturday Saints is an American rock band from Yonkers, New York, formed in 1995. The group consists of Andreas Burgos (vocals, guitar), Liam McKiernan (guitar, backing vocals, songwriter), and William Dickerson (drums).

== History ==
Saturday Saints developed their sound during the 1990s through frequent performances on the New York City nightclub circuit. They became regular performers at venues such as CBGB, Mercury Lounge, ACME Underground, Arlene's Grocery, and the Hard Rock Café. The band cultivated a loyal following during this period. In 2002, Saturday Saints were voted one of the "Top 5 Unsigned Bands in New York City" on 102.7 WNEW's Ron & Fez Show. The following year, they recorded a cover of Weezer’s “Tired of Sex” for Cleopatra Records’ compilation album A Punk Tribute to Weezer.

== Connection to Film ==
The band's music and legacy served as a key influence on the independent feature film No Alternative. Saturday Saints’ recordings were featured prominently on the film's soundtrack, which won “Best Soundtrack” at the Paris Art and Movie Awards in 2019. The soundtrack also included tracks by Mudhoney, Lisa Loeb, Superdrag, sElf, Failure, and Sebadoh, and was selected as an official Record Store Day release in 2019.

== Later Work ==
In 2022, Saturday Saints released their debut album Anhedonia on Rhyme & Reason Records. The album was described in the music press as “pure musical adrenaline” with “raw power, searing guitars, and heavy grooves.” The band followed up with the singles “Holy Roller” (2024) and “Lights. Camera. Action.” (2025).
