= Eggs over Easy =

American country rock band

- Origin: United States
- Genres: Pub rock, country rock, blues, roots rock
- Years active: 1969–1981
- Members: Jack O'Hara; Austin de Lone; Brien Hopkins; John Steel; Bill Franz; John "Jay" David

Eggs over Easy were an American country rock band, of the early 1970s, who visited London to record an album, and then became a resident band in a London pub, launching what subsequently became known as pub rock.

== Formation ==
Although both hailed from New York City, Jack O'Hara (guitar, bass & vocals) met Austin de Lone (keyboards, guitar & vocals) in Berkeley, California, where they formed a duo. The pair moved back to New York, where they met Brien Hopkins (keyboards, bass, guitar & vocals) who joined to form a multi-instrumental trio, without a drummer or percussionist. They regularly played clubs and bars in Greenwich Village and Long Island, until they acquired a small fan base, and a manager, Peter Kauff. Kauff was also helping Cannon Films to move into the music business, and arranged for Chas Chandler (bass player for the Animals and producer/manager of the Jimi Hendrix Experience) to produce their first album.

== London ==
Recording started at Olympic Studios in Barnes, London, in December 1970, initially with Les Sampson (a friend of Noel Redding who joined him in the band Road) on drums. They also played several dates at the American Embassy as a trio. Recording was completed in January 1971, with ex-Animal John Steel on drums. The recordings went well, but Kauff fell out with Cannon Films, and advised the band to stay in London, until the problems were resolved, rather than return to the US.

Chandler, by now their manager, arranged for the band to play a number of college gigs around the country. Many of these were sponsored by the American Embassy in London, which paid for the band to tour British universities to perform before larger audiences with American poets such as Marilyn Hacker, Denis Boyles and Louis Simpson. By then, the band had moved into a house, 10 Alma Street, Kentish Town, near a pub called the Tally Ho. The band were used to playing in American bars, but in common with most London pubs at the time, the Tally Ho had a jazz-only policy. They persuaded the landlord that they played jazz, although their music was predominantly country rock and blues, and first appeared on either 3 May, or 13 May 1971, with Steel on drums. They soon attracted large crowds - including other musicians, such as Graham Parker, Nick Lowe and Elvis Costello - making Eggs the pioneers of the "pub rock" movement. Eventually, they were asked to increase their performances, until they were playing three nights and Sunday lunchtime each week. On other days they often appeared at other venues, such as The Marquee, which is where Dave Robinson, Brinsley Schwarz's manager, had seen them and introduced them to the band.

Eggs over Easy had a large repertoire of over 50 of their own songs, and 50 covers, and were regularly joined on stage by members of Brinsley Schwarz and other performers, such as Loudon Wainwright III and Frankie Miller. One of the former Tally Ho jazz players, Barry Richardson, was so impressed he formed Bees Make Honey, who were also given a Tally Ho residency, alongside a mix of new and existing bands, such as Max Merritt and the Meteors and Brinsley Schwarz.

The number of venues wanting to stage Eggs Over Easy and other "pub-rock" bands was also increasing, primarily in large Victorian pubs "north of Regents Park" where there were plenty of suitable pubs. Eggs over Easy toured a chain of London pubs owned by the brewer Ind Coope, and in September and October 1971 supported John Mayall on a UK tour, with George Butler replacing Steel on drums; "Eggs over Easy's country rock-flavored repertoire offering a fascinating counterpoint to Mayall's then rampant jazz-blues fixation" (Dave Thompson).

Kauff had not managed to resolve the dispute with Cannon Films, so the album remained unreleased, and the band had not secured a contract with a UK record label either. As they were having visa problems, Kauff suggested that they return home, so on 7 November 1971 they played their last gig at the Tally Ho, and went back to the US.

== Return to US ==
Back in New York, Bill Franz joined on drums, they signed a deal with A&M Records and in 1972 they recorded their first album to be released, Good 'N' Cheap. This was partially a re-recording of the tracks originally recorded in London. The album was produced by Link Wray, at his brother, Vernon Wray’s studio in Tucson, Arizona, and the band wrote all but one of the songs.

In 1973, they moved to San Francisco, and later supported Eagles and Yes on tour, the sort of "megastar" bands that, back in England, pub rock was seen as a backlash against. By 1976 John "Jay" David (ex Dr. Hook & The Medicine Show) had replaced Franz on drums, and they issued a single "Bar in my Car", on Buffalo Records, but the record company "tanked as soon as the record came out." Originally titled "I'm Gonna Put a Bar in the Back of My Car (And Drive Myself to Drink)", the song appears on numerous internet lists of "worst country song titles" as being from their album Fear of Frying, but this is incorrect.

The second album Fear of Frying was eventually recorded in 1980/81 and issued on Squish Records, which also failed as soon as the album was released, making this album a rarity, which has yet to be re-issued on CD.

The Eggs were frequently joined on stage by Grootna's vocalist Anna Rizzo and also played with members of Commander Cody and his Lost Planet Airmen in Moonlighters. One of their final gigs was as "The Opinions", backing Dan Hicks; Eggs Over Easy finally split in 1981.

After the break-up, Hopkins continued as a songwriter, O’Hara became a recording engineer and de Lone played as a session musician with Bonnie Raitt, Nick Lowe, Elvis Costello and others.

Brien Hopkins died on January 2, 2007, at the age of 63. Austin de Lone died of lung disease on January 6, 2025, at the age of 78. Jack O'Hara, the last surviving original member, died on May 30, 2026.

== Discography ==
=== Albums ===
- Good 'N' Cheap - LP (1972) A&M (A&M 2366) : LP Re-issue (1986) Edsel : CD (1998) Edsel (ED199) : CD + bonus tracks (2006) Hux (Hux 081)
- Fear of Frying – LP (1981) Squish Records

== Singles ==
- "Back of My Car" (1974) Buffalo Records

=== Compilations ===
- Naughty Rhythms: The Best of Pub Rock CD (1996) EMI (Premier 37968) includes one "Eggs" track - "Factory"
- Goodbye Nashville Hello Camden Town – a Pub Rock Anthology CD (2007) Castle Music (CMEDD1451) includes one "Eggs" track - "Runnin' Down to Memphis"
- Good 'N' Cheap: The Eggs Over Easy Story 2-CD (2016) Yep Roc Records
