= William Dickerson (director) =

American filmmaker

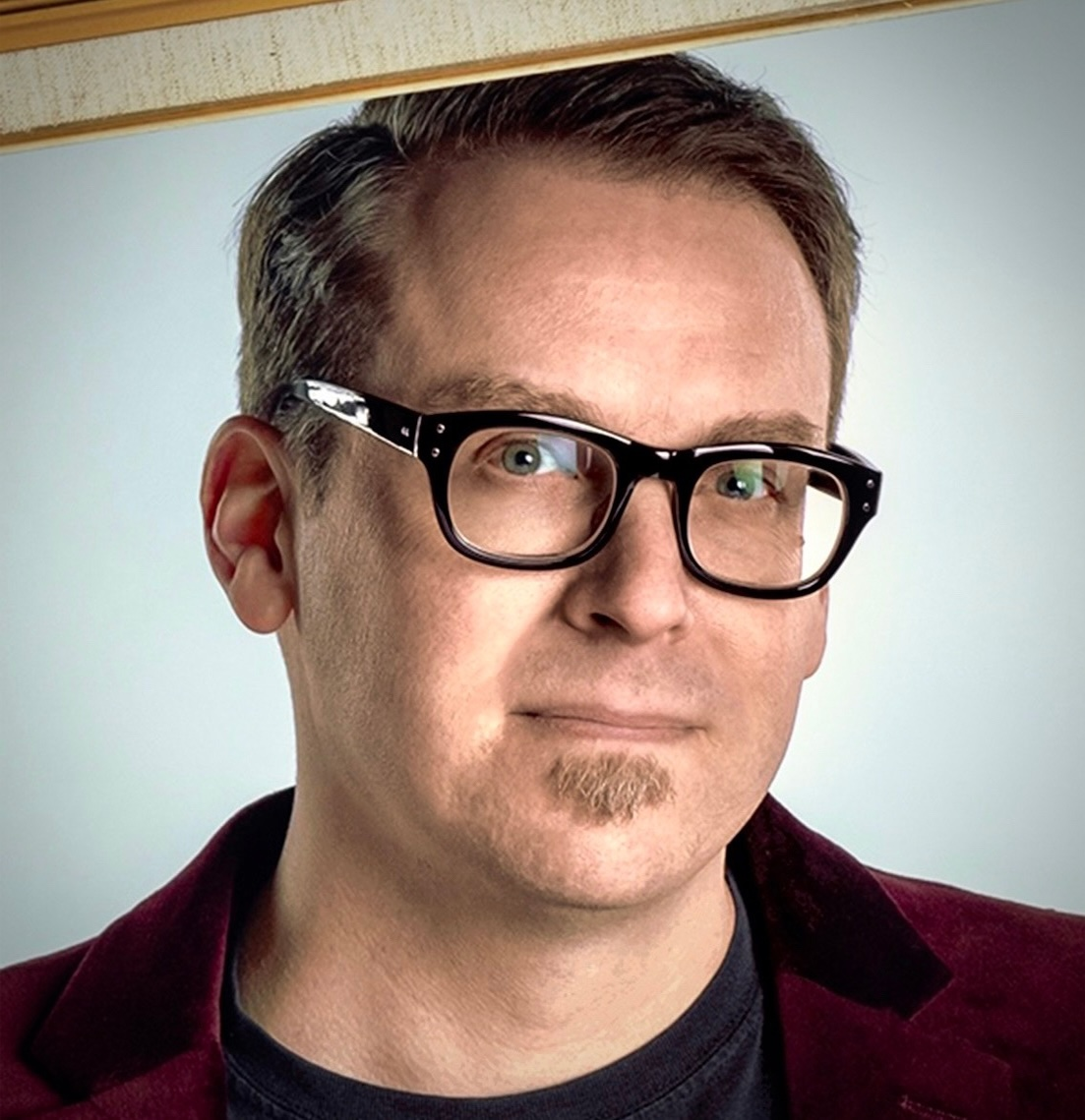
William Dickerson

William Dickerson is an American film and television director, screenwriter, author, musician and educator.

== Early life and education ==
Dickerson was born in New York City and grew up in Yonkers, New York. He attended Fordham Preparatory School and the College of the Holy Cross in Worcester, Massachusetts, where he spearheaded the school's first film concentration. He later attended the American Film Institute Conservatory, where he graduated in 2006 with an MFA in Directing. He has since served on the school's Alumni Executive Board and was selected by The White House and AFI to serve as mentor to winners of the White House Student Film Festival under two Presidents of the United States.

== Career ==
Dickerson's debut feature film, Detour, which he wrote and directed, was described by The Village Voice as an "underground hit," by The Hollywood Reporter as "a tautly efficient thriller that fully succeeds," and by The New York Times as "authentic." His metafictional satire The Mirror opened the inaugural YoFi Fest, and his film Don't Look Back, starring Lucy Ursula Griffiths and Cassidy Freeman, premiered on the Lifetime Movie Network.

Dickerson's first book, No Alternative, was described by Kirkus Reviews as "a sympathetic coming-of-age story deeply embedded in '90s music." He is also the author of the science fiction novel The Dreamachine and the monograph The Tao of Twin Peaks, a study of filmmaker David Lynch and the television series Twin Peaks.

His writing has appeared in publications including Indiewire, MovieMaker Magazine, Filmmaker Magazine, The Wrap, Script Magazine, Film Slate Magazine, Talkhouse, and SaveTheCat.com.

He adapted and directed the film version of No Alternative, starring Kathryn Erbe and Harry Hamlin. The Los Angeles Times described the film as "a remarkably assured and deeply felt grunge-era coming-of-age picture," while Film Threat called it "a rare indie gem that delivers solidly on all fronts with no missteps." The film won Best Soundtrack at the Paris Art and Movie Awards, where it was also nominated for Best Picture and Best Actress.

His band, Saturday Saints (formerly Latterday Saints), is featured on the soundtrack to No Alternative alongside such musical luminaries as: Mudhoney, Lisa Loeb, Superdrag, The Pork Guys, sElf, Failure, Sebadoh, and others. The soundtrack was chosen as one of the official releases of Record Store Day 2019. Saturday Saints are signed to Rhyme & Reason Records on which they released their debut album Anhedonia, which has been called "pure musical adrenaline" and "full of raw power, searing guitars, and heavy grooves" in the music press.

== Filmography ==
=== Film ===
Year	Title	Role	Notes
2003	F-Word (short film)	Director	
2004	Confessions of a Dangerous Mime (short film)	Director/Writer	
2007	Shadowbox (short film)	Director/Writer	AFI Thesis film
2013	Detour	Director/Writer	Co-written with Dwight Moody
2013	The Mirror	Director/Writer	Also Actor/Producer/Cinematographer
2014	Don't Look Back	Director/Writer	A Lifetime Movie
2014	The Assault	Associate Producer	
2019	No Alternative	Director/Writer	
