= Bees Make Honey (band) =

- Origin: United Kingdom
- Genres: Pub rock
- Years active: 1971 - 1974
- Past members: Barry Richardson; Ruan O'Lochlainn; Deke O'Brien; Mick Molloy; Bob "Cee" Siebenberg; Fran Byrne; Rod Demick; Malcolm Morley; Willy Finlayson; Ed Deane; Kevin McAlea; Chris Hargrave; Paul Atkinson

Bees Make Honey were an influential band in the early pub rock movement in the UK.

The band were formed in 1971 in north London by Barry Richardson, who had a residency in a jazz band at the "Tally Ho" pub, when Eggs over Easy started playing pub rock there. He invited Ruan O'Lochlainn, Deke O'Brien and Mick Molloy to see Eggs over Easy and they formed a band with American drummer Bob "Cee" Siebenberg, who would later rise to fame in Supertramp. Richardson, O’Brien and Molloy were former members of Irish showband The Alpine Seven, and of Dublin's first Rhythm & Blues band Bluesville (with Ian Whitcomb). They initially performed as an unnamed band at the "Tally Ho", where Richardson had previously performed, eventually naming themselves Bees Make Honey in January 1972.

While touring heavily on the emerging pub rock circuit, Bees Make Honey signed with record label EMI who issued their first single "Knee Trembler" / "Caldonia" (EMI 2078 (1972)), and their debut album Music Every Night (EMI 3013 (1973)). The album was recorded at Rockfield Studios and produced by their manager Dave Robinson, who also managed Brinsley Schwarz, but by the time the album was released, O’Lochlainn and Siebenberg had left. Drummer Fran Byrne, guitarist Rod Demick (ex Screaming Lord Sutch) and keyboardist Malcolm Morley (ex Help Yourself) joined, and toured to promote the album. They supported T. Rex at the Brixton Academy, but most of the audience were teenage girls desperate to see Marc Bolan, and the band was booed heavily. They appeared on BBC2's In Concert in 1973. In 1974 original members O'Brien and Molloy left, and Morley joined Man, so guitarists Willy Finlayson and Ed Deane, and keyboardist Kevin McAlea, joined. This line up recorded the second album, but EMI dropped both the unreleased album and the band. Another album was cut for DJM Records, but when this was also not released, the band broke up in late 1974.

After the break-up, Byrne moved to Ace, Demick and Finlayson formed Meal Ticket, and McAlea went on to work with Kate Bush on her 1979 tour and her series of concerts in 2014 in London.

A 4-track EP ("Sylvie"/"Namalee"/"Boogie Queen"/"Don't Stop Now") entitled Bees Make Honey was released by Charly (CEP 117) in 1977. In November 1996, Bees Make Honey were included along with other notable UK pub rock bands on a two-disc compilation by EMI Naughty Rhythms: The Best of Pub Rock (EMI Premiere 37968). Subsequently, in 2003, label Acadia released a two-disc anthology entitled Back on Track, combining studio sessions and representative live performances by the band. The Bees also contribute three tracks ("What Have we Got to Loose", "Indian Bayou Saturday" and "Dance Around") and Meal Ticket one ("Day Job") to Goodbye Nashville, Hello Camden Town: A Pub Rock Anthology issued by Castle Records in March 2007 (CMEDD1451).

== Sources ==
- Bees Make Honey at AllMusic
- Bees Make Honey - Music Every Night
- AMG: Naughty Rhythms
- Pub Rock
- Bees Make Honey at irishrock.org
