= Lewisham Odeon =

Former cinema in London, England

Coordinates: 51°27′50.18″N 0°0′43.63″W

- Interactive map of Lewisham Odeon
- Location: Loampit Vale, Lewisham, London, SE13
- Owner: Gaumont-British (1932 - 1941); Rank Organisation (1941 - 1981)
- Capacity: 3,050

Construction
- Opened: 1962
- Closed: 1981

The Lewisham Odeon was a cinema and music venue located in Lewisham, London, England. During its nearly half a century open the changes in British popular music can be seen reflected in the acts to perform there, particularly in the 1950s, '60s, and '70s.

== History ==
It opened in 1932 as the Gaumont Palace with the films Westward Passage and The Midshipmaid. With 3,050 seats it was among the UK's largest cinemas.

An article originally published in the Observer on 16 September 1956 quotes a soldier visiting the cinema to see Rock Around The Clock saying "You should have seen this place last night. Jiving on the stage they were, till the cops came." It goes on to mention a boy escorted out by police, also for jiving, and ending up in a "meat-wagon"

In October 1959 a pre-fame Georgie Fame, then known as Clive Powell, auditioned for pop manager Larry Parnes at the theater during The Marty Wilde Show. He performed a cover of Jerry Lee Lewis' High School Confidential and was hired as a backing pianist for Parnes “stable” of singers.

On Sunday, 1 May 1960, Gene Vincent re-started his U.K. tour at the Gaumont after the car crash on the 16th April following his Bristol concert, as reported by the New Musical Express, the following week. He sang, so that newspaper reported, Over the Rainbow.

The building reopened in 1962 as the Lewisham Odeon after being closed for several months due to a fire. It nostalgically re-screened The Midshipmaid, and its first new showing was That Touch of Mink.

Over the years it hosted performances from artists such as David Bowie, Queen, Status Quo, Nat King Cole, Johnny Cash, The Hollies, The Beatles, Ray Charles, The Rolling Stones, Little Richard, Bo Diddley, The Everly Brothers, The Supremes, Deep Purple, Dire Straits, Rod Stewart and The Faces, The Clash, Carl Perkins, Wings, Ian Dury, The Specials, Siouxsie and the Banshees, The Cure, Emerson, Lake & Palmer, Adam and The Ants, Stevie Wonder, Martha Reeves & The Vandellas, Thin Lizzy, Tom Robinson Band, Hawkwind, T. Rex, Gladys Knight and the Pips, Desmond Dekker, Jimmy Ruffin, Carol Woods, Gerry and the Pacemakers and The Who.

On 27 May 1978 Black Sabbath headlined there on their Never Say Die tour, with support from Van Halen.

In 1977, 1979, and 1980 Lewisham Council rejected applications from then owners of Odeon, Rank Leisure, to convert it into a bingo hall. Rank closed the cinema and venue on 14 February 1981. The Stage reported at the time that the council had hoped to retain the cinema and its planning and development committee would be meeting to consider a plan submitted by Rank to convert it into "two smaller studio cinemas and a department store". Its final concerts were two dates by The Who on 8 and 9 February.

The building was demolished in 1991 for a road widening scheme.
