= English folk music (1990–1999) =

Music genre

== Births and deaths ==
=== Deaths ===
- Peter Bellamy (1944–1991)
- Stan Hugill (1906–1992)
- Walter Pardon (4 March 1914–9 June 1996)

== Recordings ==
- 1990: Roots and Wing (Sheila Chandra)
- 1990: The Five Seasons (Fairport Convention)
- 1991: Carols and Capers (Maddy Prior)
- 1991: The Woodworm Years (Fairport Convention)
- 1992: Angel Tiger (June Tabor)
- 1993: Signs (Kathryn Tickell)
- 1994: 25th Anniversary Concert (Fairport Convention)
- 1995: Jewel in the Crown (Fairport Convention)
- 1995: Common Tongue (Waterson–Carthy)
- 1996: Heat Light and Sound (Eliza Carthy)
- 1996: Old New Borrowed Blue (Fairport Convention)
- 1996: Time (Steeleye Span)
- 1997: Who Knows Where the Time Goes (Fairport Convention)
- 1997: Hourglass (Kate Rusby)
- 1998: The Cropredy Box (Fairport Convention)
- 1998: Infinite Blue (The Poozies)
- 1998: Horkstow Grange (Steeleye Span)
- 1999: Meet On the Ledge: The Classic Years 1967-1975 (Fairport Convention)
- 1999: Cropredy 98 (Fairport Convention)
- 1999: Ravenchild (Maddy Prior)
- 1999: Sleepless (Kate Rusby)

== See also ==
- Music of the United Kingdom (1990s)
- Music of the United Kingdom (2000s)
