= English folk music (1950–1959) =

== Births and deaths ==
=== Births ===
- Mike Oldfield (1953)
- Kirsty MacColl (1959–2000)
- Martin Simpson (1953)
- Clive Gregson (1955)
- Jez Lowe (1955)

=== Deaths ===
- Ralph Vaughan Williams (1872–1958)

== Recordings ==
- 1957: Sings English Folk Songs (Steve Benbow)
- 1959: Sweet England (Shirley Collins)

== See also ==
- Music of the United Kingdom (1950s)
