= Kingdom of Fear (Shitdisco album) =

Studio album by Shitdisco
- Released: 16 April 2007
- Genres: New rave Dance-punk
- Label: Fierce Panda Records

Professional ratings
Review scores
Source	Rating
The Guardian	4/5 stars
NME	9/10
Pitchfork Media	5.7/10
PopMatters	5/10

Kingdom of Fear is the only album by the Scottish dance-punk/new rave band Shitdisco released on 16 April 2007 on Fierce Panda Records.

It contains newly recorded versions of tracks from their double A-side "Disco Blood"/"I Know Kung Fu", their second single "Reactor Party", and 7 new tracks, including new single "OK" (released on 23 April). The title is taken from the last book by American author Hunter S. Thompson.

In its first week of release it reached number 4 in the UK Indie Album chart.

The album was released in the US on 23 September 2008 as The Emanator on the Downtown Records label.

== Track listing ==
1. "I Know Kung Fu"
2. "Reactor Party"
3. "Disco Blood"
4. "72 Virgins"
5. "Dream of Infinity"
6. "3D Sex Show"
7. "Lover of Others"
8. "Another"
9. "OK"
10. "Fear of the Future"
