= Darren Cullen (activist) =

British artist and political cartoonist

- Born: Darren Cullen; 1983 (age 42–43); Leeds, West Yorkshire, England
- Education: Glasgow School of Art
- Known for: Visual art, satire
- Website: spellingmistakescostlives.com

Darren Cullen (born 1983) is a British-Irish artist and activist whose artwork satirises topics ranging from the insidious nature of advertising, from the culpability of the "Santa lie" to armed forces recruitment propaganda.

In 2014, his anti-army recruitment comic 'Join the Army' was added to the Victoria and Albert Museum permanent collection.

== Art ==
Cullen came to prominence as a student in 2005 when his plan to erect a billboard that attacked the commercialisation of Christmas was scrapped. Cullen says his 2012 work Baby's First Baby was about "the way these toys intrinsically train girls to have and care for children while they are still only children themselves". In 2014, Cullen opened a shop installation called 'Pocket Money Loans' in Finsbury Park at Atom Gallery. A payday loan shop for kids, which appeared to give children an advance on their pocket money at 5000% interest. In 2015, he took the work to Banksy's Dismaland, opening the shop in a portacabin next to the children's play area.

In 2015, alongside Veterans for Peace UK, he released a series of films called "Action Man: Battlefield Casualties". Directed by Price James, featuring Matt Berry and written by Cullen, the films parody '90s Action Man toy adverts to draw attention to the possible outcomes of military service through three short 'adverts' for PTSD Action Man, Paralysed Action Man and Dead Action Man. They were part of a campaign by Veterans for Peace UK to raise the British military age of recruitment from 16 to 18, in line with other European and NATO countries.

In a protest against the Kreuzpflicht law, in 2018 Cullen sent out dozens of crucifixes to Bavarian state buildings, having altered each cross that the hanging hook was on the bottom edge, forcing the crucifix to be hung upside down. The packages contained instructions and a letter designed to look like official Bavarian state communications. This was funded and assisted by the non-theistic Satanic Temple's UK chapter, causing a religious schism that lead to the creation of Global Order of Satan.

In 2019 he opened a Museum of Neoliberalism in Leegate Shopping Centre, Lee, London, which he co-curated with art historian Gavin Grindon.

In 2021 Cullen created the 'Hell Bus' a mobile exhibition inside an old school bus that satirised Shell plc's greenwashing advertising campaigns, and brought it to Glasgow for COP26. The project featured on Joe Lycett's Channel 4 documentary Joe Lycett vs the Oil Giant. It has since appeared at Glastonbury Festival and The World Transformed in Liverpool.

== Music ==
Cullen played drums in the bands Shitdisco and Age of Consent. While a member of Shitdisco, he worked with the Japanese idol group 80_pan to compose and arrange the song "crazy", released on the 2008 album DISCO BABY.

== Writing ==
Cullen co-wrote a monthly satirical 'horoscopes' column with Mark Tolson for The Skinny magazine until 2017.
