= Music of the United Kingdom (2000s and 2010s) =

Overview of music in the UK in the period 2000–2020

Popular music of the United Kingdom in the 21st century continued to expand and develop new subgenres and fusions. While talent show contestants were one of the major forces in pop music, British soul maintained and even extended its high-profile with figures like Joss Stone, Estelle, Duffy and Adele, while a new group of singer-songwriters led by Amy Winehouse and Westlife achieved international success. New forms of dance music emerged, including grime and dubstep. There was also a revival of garage rock and post-punk, which when mixed with electronic music produced new rave.

== Rock ==
=== Post-Britpop ===
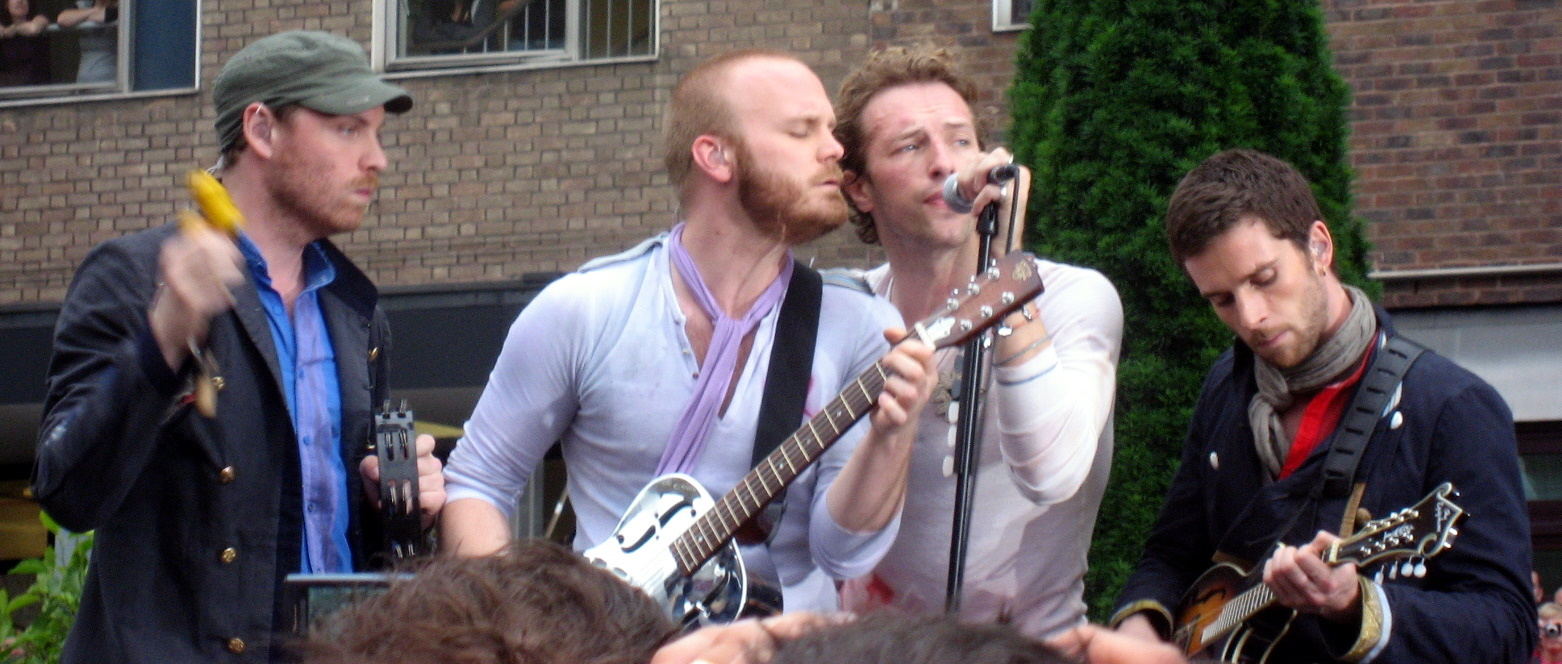
Coldplay, considered to be the most successful band of the 21st century.

Post-Britpop bands such as The Verve, Radiohead, and Travis were followed in the 2000s by acts including Snow Patrol, from Northern Ireland and Elbow, Embrace, Starsailor, Doves and Keane from England, with music that was often more melodic and introspective. The most commercially successful band in the milieu were Coldplay, whose début album Parachutes (2000) went multi-platinum and helped make them one of the most popular acts in the world by the time of their second album A Rush of Blood to the Head (2002).

=== Garage rock revival/post-punk revival ===
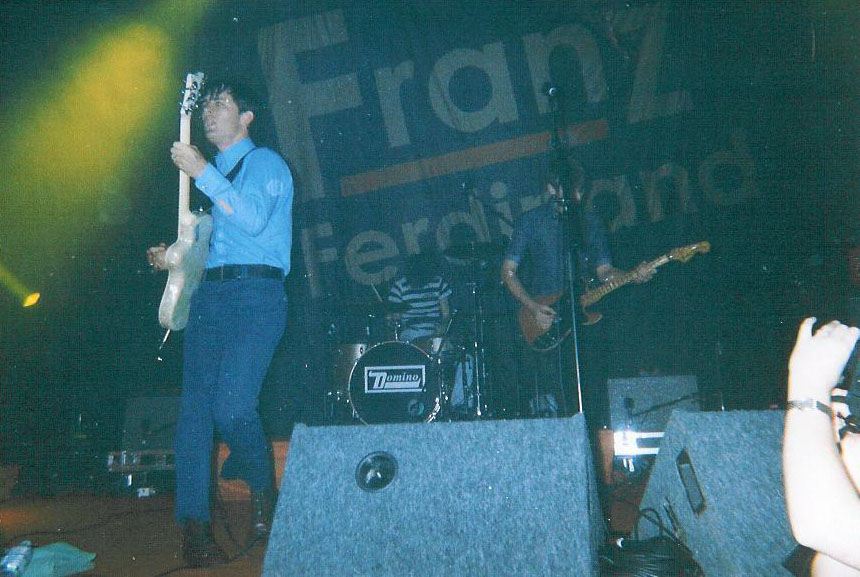
Franz Ferdinand in concert in 2004

Like many American alternative rock bands, during the late 1990s and early 2000s, several British indie bands emerged, including Franz Ferdinand, the Libertines and Bloc Party, that drew primary inspiration from new wave and post-punk groups such as Joy Division, Wire, and Gang of Four, establishing the post-punk revival movement. Other prominent independent rock bands in the 2000s included: Editors, the Fratellis, Placebo, Razorlight, Kaiser Chiefs, the Kooks and Arctic Monkeys (the last being the most prominent act to owe their success to the use of internet social networking).

=== Soft rock and singer-songwriter ===
The decade saw the solo success for British singer-songwriters, including David Gray, Dido making use of acoustic music and remixes, whose breakthrough albums White Ladder (2000) and No Angel (1999) respectively, went multi-platinum. Later in decade a second wave including James Blunt with Back to Bedlam (2003), KT Tunstall with Eye to the Telescope (2004), James Morrison with Undiscovered (2006), and Amy Macdonald with This Is the Life (2007) enjoyed similar levels of success.

=== Heavy metal ===
The term "retro-metal" has been applied to such bands as The Darkness, whose unique mix of glam rock and heavy riffs earned them a string of singles hits and a quintuple platinum album with One Way Ticket to Hell... and Back (2005), which reached number 11. Bullet for My Valentine, from Wales, broke into the top 5 in both the US and UK charts with their melodic dark rock, with Scream Aim Fire (2008). Asking Alexandria's third studio album, From Death to Destiny, also debuted in the top five of the Billboard 200 during the week it was released, while also debuting at number 1 in both the British Rock and Metal charts.

=== New rave ===
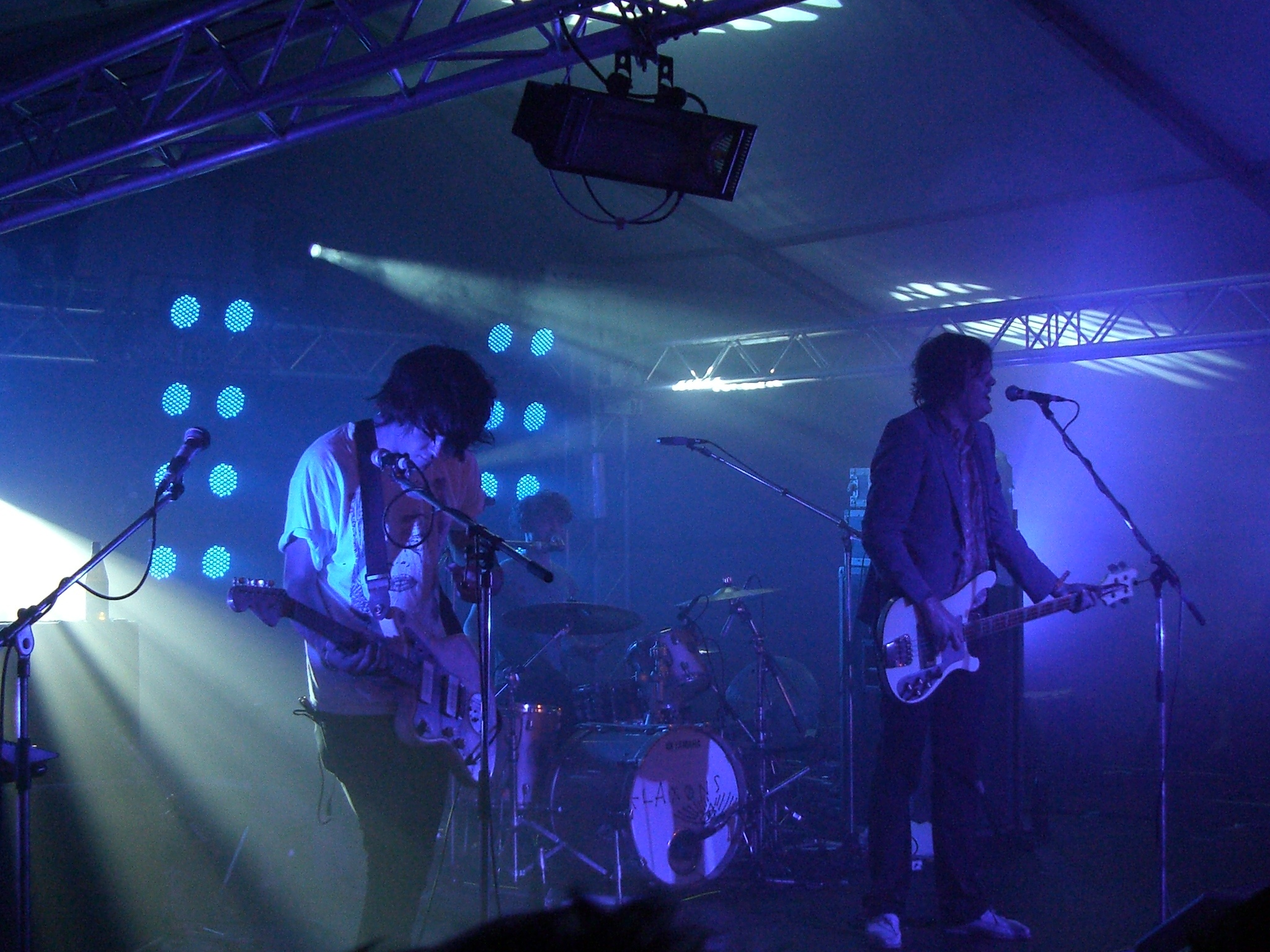
Klaxons in concert in 2007

With developments in computer technology and music software, it became possible to create high quality music using little more than a single laptop computer. This resulted in a massive increase in the amount of home-produced electronic music available to the general public via the expanding internet, and new forms of performance such as laptronica and live coding. In Britain the combination of indie with American pioneered dance-punk was dubbed new rave in publicity for Klaxons and the term was picked up and applied by the NME to a number of bands, including Trash Fashion, New Young Pony Club, Hadouken!, Late of the Pier, Test Icicles, and Shitdisco forming a scene with a similar visual aesthetic to earlier rave music.

=== Pop rock ===
As pop rock and pop-punk had become popular in the United States by bands such as Green Day, The Offspring and Blink-182, the UK saw pop-rock bands break into mainstream. The first band to breakthrough would be Busted with their 2002 hit single "What I Go to School For". The band's mainstream success was limited with their break-up on 14 January 2005. McFly have enjoyed commercial success with their 2004 breakthrough album Room on the 3rd Floor, which went straight to no.1 in the UK.

=== Punk ===
A grassroots punk scene has continued in the UK. Since the late 2000s, this has been mainly built around the hub of the annual Rebellion Festival in Blackpool. The 2010s saw a particular profusion of younger female or female-fronted bands affiliated to the punk scene.

== Pop ==
New girl groups managed to enjoy sustained success, including Sugababes and Girls Aloud, the last of these the most successful British product of the many Popstars format programmes, which began to have a major impact in the charts from the beginning of the 2000s. The Saturdays were the next girl group to sustain success in the late 2000s, after being inspired by Girls Aloud and touring with them. The most successful winner Leona Lewis enjoyed a number one album in 2008 and her début single "Bleeding Love" was the first number one single in the U.S. charts by a British solo female artist since Kim Wilde in 1987. The 2000s also saw the reunion of Take That, who went on to achieve new stardom by the end of the decade. In the early 2010s, the British boy and girl bands, The Wanted, One Direction, and Little Mix have experienced worldwide success, charting highly in Britain as well as North America.

== Soul and female singer-songwriters ==
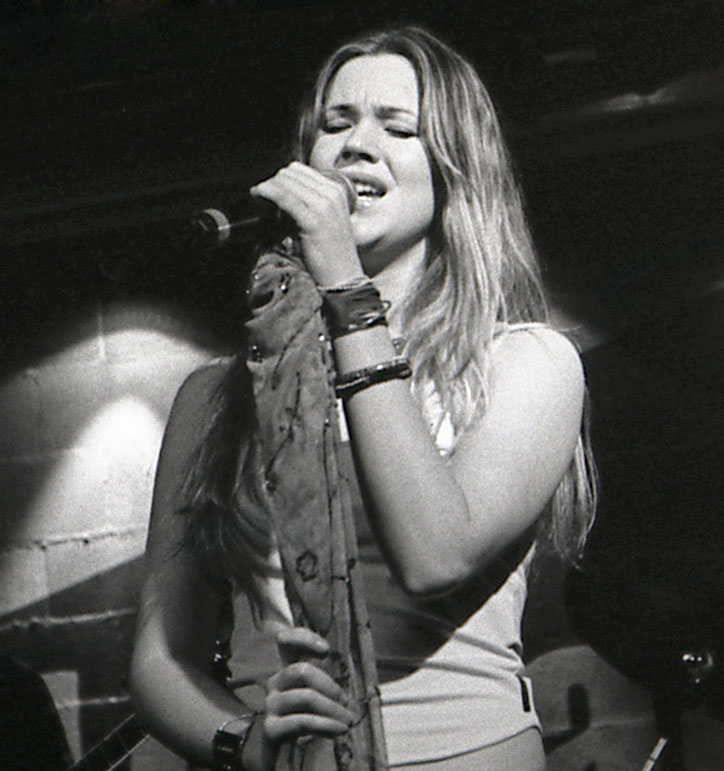
Joss Stone was one of the most successful British soul acts of the decade.

British soul in the 2000s was dominated by female singers, many of them white, including Natasha Bedingfield, Joss Stone, Amy Winehouse, Estelle, Adele and Duffy, all of whom have enjoyed success in the American charts, leading to talk of a "Third British Invasion", "Female Invasion" or "British soul invasion" leading the charts like "American Boy", "No Substitute Love" o "Pretty Please (Love Me)" by Estelle or "Mercy" by Duffy. In 2009, the single "Down" reached the No. 1 spot on the Billboard Hot 100 and sold two million copies in the United States, making Jay Sean "the most successful male UK urban artist in US chart history." Female singer-songwriters of various genres began to dominate the British charts in 2006 with the previously mentioned Winehouse and Lily Allen. In August 2011, the top 5 positions on the album charts were held by both Adele and Amy Winehouse with two albums each, and by American singer Beyoncé holding the other spot. British singer-songwriter Paloma Faith reached No. 2 on the album charts in 2012 with her second album Fall to Grace.

== Nu-folk ==
In the 2000s bands and artists appeared who functioned as cross-over acts between the indie rock and folk scenes. Their music often used traditional instruments, sometimes beside electronic music. London's nu-folk scene included artists like Laura Marling, Noah and the Whale, Mumford & Sons and Johnny Flynn and that in Scotland, centred on Glasgow and with a more Celtic tinge, included artists such as Findlay Napier and the Bar Room Mountaineers and Pearl and the Puppets.

== Grime and hip hop ==
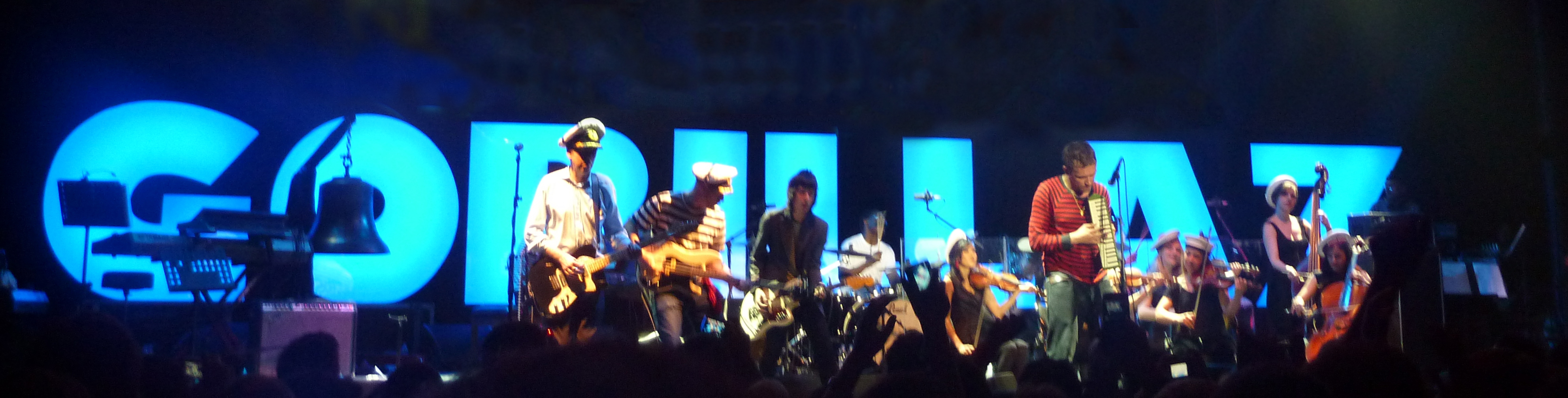
Live concert of the Gorillaz, April 2010

At the beginning of the 2000s a new style of electronic music, influenced heavily by hip hop and UK garage, and dubbed grime (sometimes called eskibeat or sublow), included acts such as Dizzee Rascal, Lady Sovereign, Wiley, Sway DaSafo, Ghetto and Kano. The eponymous debut album of Gorillaz, created by Damon Albarn in 2001, sold over seven million copies and earned them an entry in the Guinness Book of World Records as the Most Successful Virtual Band. The success of The Streets' 2002 album Original Pirate Material drew the media's attention to lighter, more melodic rap as a form of pop music and this was followed by the success of Welsh rap group Goldie Lookin' Chain and acts like N-Dubz, Tinchy Stryder and Chipmunk, dubbed "Brithop" by the press. Other successful Grime artists include Aggro Santos, Tinie Tempah, Professor Green, Bashy, Devlin and Skepta. The popularity of UK rap grew significantly in the UK in the late 2000s. The year 2009 marked the first time a British rapper had reached the top of the UK singles chart, and UK rappers achieved six No. 1 singles in both 2009 and 2010. Grime Artists to reach the No. 1 spot are Taio Cruz, Dizzee Rascal, Tinchy Stryder, Chipmunk, Tinie Tempah, Roll Deep and Plan B.

== Electronic music ==
=== Dubstep ===
Dubstep developed from garage music at the end of the 1990s and in the early 2000s, using elements of drum'n'bass, techno, and dub, to produce a largely instrumental, "dark" sound, based around relatively simple rhythms and often with extended hypnotic mixes. Its origins centred around the London Forward>> club nights and it was disseminated through pirate radio shows. Major artists included Skream, Burial, Kode9, Pinch, Horsepower Productions, Vex'd, Digital Mystikz, Zomby, Shackleton and Benga. Releases like Burial's Untrue (2007) and the mix albums series Dubstep All-Stars helped the subgenre gain critical and some limited commercial success.

Trip hop

Trip hop evolved significantly in the 2000s, transitioning into a smoother, cleaner style that eventually lead to new genres of electronic music. With new production tools like Ableton Live and Logic Pro, Trip hop artists were able to create a more polished sound, adding more sampling and live instrumentation. Elements from dub, soul, and samples became more prevalent. Tricky adapted sounds from punk, pop, and electro, adding live bass and guitar to some of his tracks. Bands like Portishead and Massive Attack began adding more layers, samples and live instruments to their albums. Trip hop gained wider recognition in the mainstream, appearing in commercials, movie soundtracks, and TV shows. Notable mainstream artists and bands began incorporating trip hop’s influences into their music. Radiohead and Blur began incorporating trip-hop elements into their albums.

Synthpop

In the 2000s synthpop began to re-emerge as a new wave of indie artists began to incorporate the sound into their songs. Major British acts to be influenced by this sound include pioneers Goldfrapp, Ladytron and Hot Chip, who were followed by acts including Little Boots, Ellie Goulding and La Roux. The electronic sound and style have arguably influenced many other mainstream pop artists, including Lily Allen's second album It's Not Me, It's You (2009), which abandoned the ska influences of her earlier work. British soul/R&B artists such as Jay Sean and Taio Cruz have also embraced electro-pop sounds.

== Mid 2000s-early 2010s ==
British musical success in the United States was at its lowest point in the early 2000s. Less than 2% of the top 100 United States albums in both 2000 and 2001 were from the United Kingdom. In April 2002, for the first time since October 1963, there were no British acts on the Billboard Hot 100 singles chart. This would be reversed in the latter half of the decade when the percentage of albums sold in the US by British acts increased every year from 2005 through 2008. It would increase from 8.5% to 10% of the market between 2007 and 2008.

In 2007 Joss Stone's third album Introducing Joss Stone debuted at number two on the Billboard 200 becoming the first British solo female artist to have an album début that high on the chart. In 2006 and early 2007 British acts James Blunt, Amy Winehouse, Lily Allen, Snow Patrol and Corinne Bailey Rae also had US chart success. By March 2007 these successes had led to speculation that either another British Invasion was underway or that there was a return to normalcy. In 2008 Leona Lewis's single "Bleeding Love" topped the Billboard Hot 100, and her album, Spirit, also reached number 1, as Lewis became the first UK solo artist to debut at number one in the US with a debut album. The year would also be a successful one for Duffy, Adele, Estelle, and M.I.A. Led by Coldplay, British acts received a total of 16 Grammy Awards in 2009. In 2009, Jay Sean topped the Billboard Hot 100, followed by Taio Cruz in 2010. Based on having the largest airplay and sales in the US, Muse were named the Billboard Alternative and Rock artist for 2010.

In 2011 albums by British artists totaled 1 in 8 of all albums sold in North America. This represented a 25% jump from 2010 and according to the British Phonographic Industry trade organization this was believed to represent the largest market share there since the Second British Invasion of the 1980s. 30 albums by British artists sold over 100,000 copies. During one week that year from three British artists, Adele, Mumford & Sons and Marsha Ambrosius, held the top three album spots during one week for the first time in a quarter of a century. Adele became the first female singer to be named Billboard's top artist and have both the number 1 album (21) and number 1 single ("Rolling in the Deep") for the same year By the time 2011 ended Adele had broken various records on the Billboard charts. 21 again topped the 'Billboard 200 album chart in 2012 It was only the second time in the history of the chart an album was number one for two consecutive years. Tinie Tempah became the first British hip hop artist to have a debut US single that sold at least one million units and two singles from the record have entered the Billboard Hot 100. The second single from Jessie J sold a million units, Ellie Goulding's single Lights was number 5 on the 2012 Billboard Hot 100, and the success of Florence and the Machine led to the band being the topic of a Billboard Magazine cover story in September. In March 2012, One Direction's debut studio album, Up All Night, topped the US Billboard 200 chart, becoming the first British group in US chart history to debut at number one with their first album. In October 2012, Mumford & Sons' second album, Babel, debuted at number one on the US Billboard 200, and was the fastest selling album in 2012 in the US, selling 600,000 in its first week. From the lull in the early 2000s, various explanations have been given by people in the music industry for the resurgence of UK success in the USthSpin Magazine]] music editor Charles Aaron, speaking of the female singer-songwriters, called Amy Winehouse's breakthrough the "Nirvana moment". Billboard's chart manager Keith Caulfield also credited Winehouse and said, "They're not giving us the usual 'We're going to stay up until 6 am and party like we've never partied before,'?". Caulfield says, "Their approach is more classic and quirky, which makes Americans pay more attention. Tinie Tempah credited the confidence of the British Artists and David Joseph, the chairman of Universal Music UK noted that unlike in the past British artists are not specifically targeting the US but American audiences are noticing their talent through the internet.

The success of British music in the United States has been seen as part of broader Anglophile trend in the United States that has also seen a noticeable increase in use of British expressions, interest in the royal family, and British television programmes.

== See also ==
- 2000s in music
- Music of the United Kingdom (1950s)
- Music of the United Kingdom (1960s)
- Music of the United Kingdom (1970s)
- Music of the United Kingdom (1980s)
- Music of the United Kingdom (1990s)
