= Kreuzpflicht =

Bavarian building regulation

The Kreuzpflicht (lit. 'cross obligation') is a requirement for a cross to be mounted at the entrance of public buildings in the German federated state of Bavaria. The regulation was enacted by the state government of Bavaria in 2018. Colleges, museums and theaters are exempt from the rule, but the state government still recommends that they should display crosses.

== Reaction ==
Although opinion polls show opposition to the policy at a national level, one poll has shown 56% of voters in Bavaria as supporting the policy.

The regulation has been criticized by many different civil society organizations, with opponents including Christian organizations and leaders including Cardinal Reinhard Marx. the chairman of the German Bishops' Conference, and by Thomas Sternberg of the Central Committee of German Catholics, who described the crucifix as "not suitable for election purposes".

Some observers have stated that the regulation may be prohibited by Article 4 of the Basic Law for the Federal Republic of Germany that guarantees freedom of faith and conscience. The Bavarian Prime Minister Markus Söder has stated that the crosses are not intended to be a Christian symbol, but a symbol of Bavarian cultural identity.

Some observers have described the Kreuzpflicht as a measure to appeal to voters deserting the Christian-democratic conservative CSU for the right-wing nationalist AfD party. The AfD has criticized the Kreuzpflicht as "gesture politics".

Some German artists, scientists and students protested the regulation.

British-Irish artist Darren Cullen sent out dozens of crucifixes to Bavarian state buildings, having altered each cross that the hanging hook was on the bottom edge, forcing the crucifix to be hung upside down. The packages contained instructions and a letter designed to look like official Bavarian state communications. This was funded and assisted by the non-theistic Satanic Temple U.K., now Global Order of Satan. These actions were criticised as inflammatory and offensive.

== See also ==
- Separation of church and state#Germany
