= Music of the United Kingdom (1960s) =

Music of the United Kingdom developed in the 1960s into one of the leading forms of popular music in the modern world. By the early 1960s the British had developed a viable national music industry and began to produce adapted forms of American music in Beat music and British blues which would be re-exported to America by bands such as the Beatles, the Animals and the Rolling Stones. This helped to make the dominant forms of popular music something of a shared Anglo-American creation, and led to the growing distinction between pop and rock music, which began to develop into diverse and creative subgenres that would characterise the form throughout the rest of the twentieth century.

== Rock music ==
=== Beat music ===
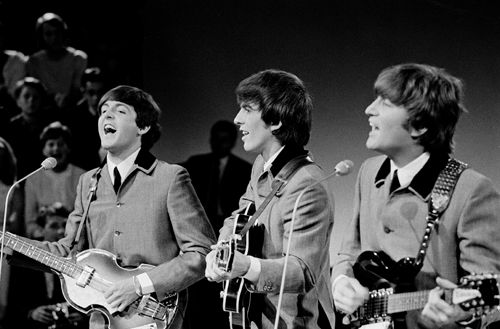
The arrival of the Beatles in the U.S., and subsequent appearance on The Ed Sullivan Show, marked the start of the British Invasion. They had 20 #1 Billboard Hot 100 hits.

In the late 1950s, a flourishing culture of groups began to emerge, often out of the declining skiffle scene, in major urban centres in the UK like Liverpool, Manchester, Birmingham and London. This was particularly true in Liverpool, where it has been estimated that there were around 350 different bands active, often playing ballrooms, concert halls and clubs. Beat bands were heavily influenced by American bands of the era, such as Buddy Holly and the Crickets (from which group the Beatles derived their name), as well as earlier British groups such as the Shadows. After the national success of the Beatles in Britain from 1962, a number of Liverpool performers were able to follow them into the charts, including Gerry and the Pacemakers, the Searchers, and Cilla Black. Among the most successful beat acts from Birmingham were The Spencer Davis Group and the Moody Blues. From London, the term Tottenham Sound was largely based around the Dave Clark Five, but other London bands that benefited from the beat boom of this era included the Rolling Stones and the Yardbirds. The first non-Liverpool, non-Brian Epstein-managed band to break through in the UK were Freddie and the Dreamers, who were based in Manchester, as were Herman's Hermits and the Hollies. The beat movement provided most of the bands responsible for the British Invasion of the American pop charts in the period after 1964, and furnished the model for many important developments in pop and rock music.

=== British Invasion ===
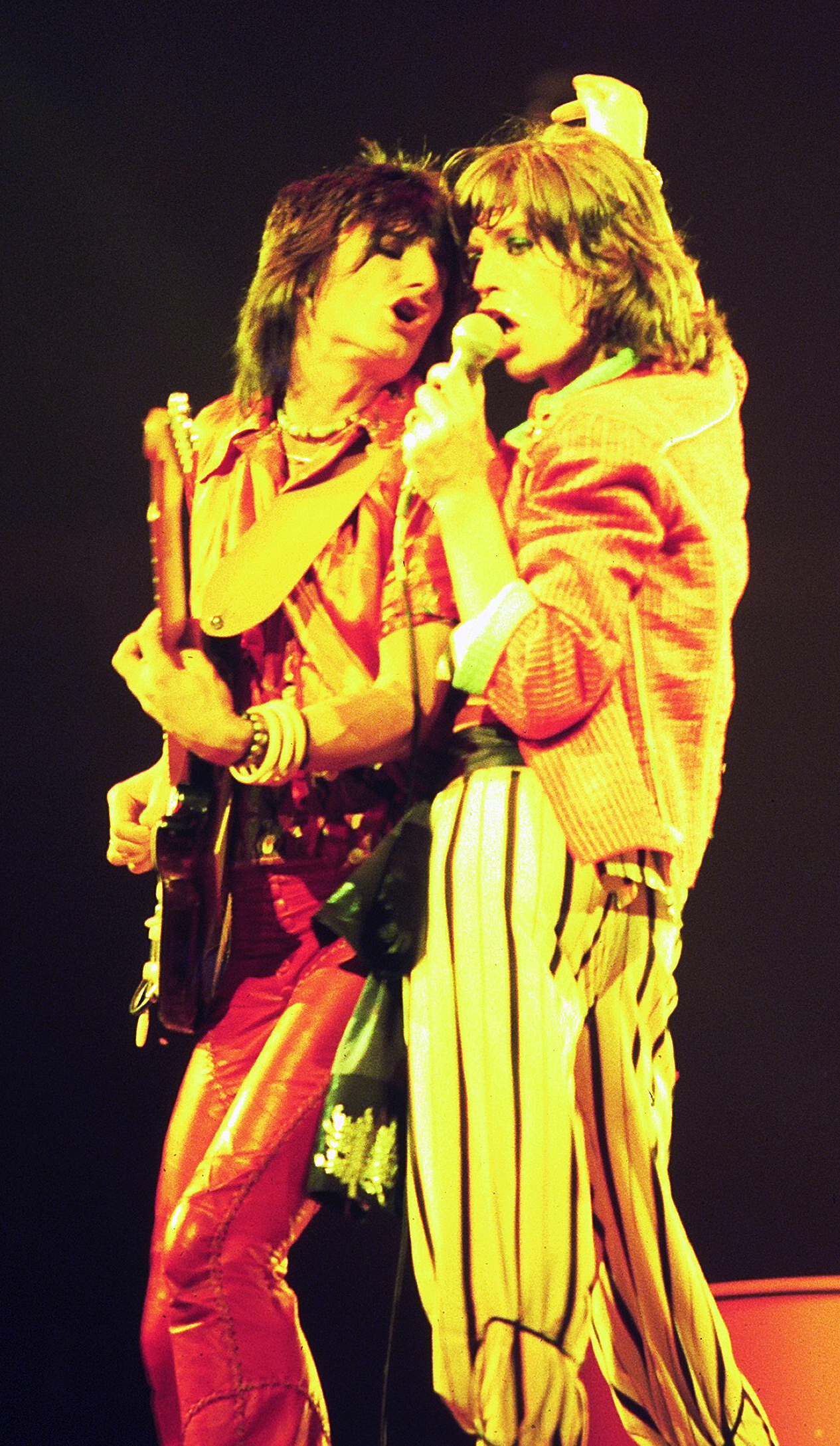
The Rolling Stones in 1975

The British Invasion is a term used mainly in the United States to describe the large number of rock and roll, beat and pop performers from the United Kingdom who became popular in the U.S. from 1964 to 1966. After first running a story on 10 December 1963, CBS Evening News with Walter Cronkite on 7 February 1964 ran a story about the Beatles' United States arrival in which the correspondent said "The British Invasion this time goes by the code name Beatlemania". A few days later they appeared on The Ed Sullivan Show. Seventy five per cent of Americans watching television that night viewed their appearance thus "launching" the invasion with a massive wave of chart success that would continue until they broke up in 1970. On 4 April 1964, the Beatles held the top five positions on the Billboard Hot 100 singles chart, the only time to date that any act has accomplished this feat. The Dave Clark Five followed the Beatles the very next week on The Ed Sullivan Show, and appeared on the Sullivan show more than any other British band, 18 times. During the next two years, the Dave Clark Five, the Animals, Petula Clark, Manfred Mann, Peter and Gordon, Freddie and the Dreamers, Wayne Fontana and the Mindbenders, Herman's Hermits, the Rolling Stones (had 8 #1 Billboard Hot 100 hits in the 1960s and 1970s), the Troggs, and Donovan would have one or more number one singles.

Other acts that were part of the invasion included the Who, and the Kinks. British Invasion acts influenced fashion, haircuts and manners of the 1960s of what was to be known as The Counterculture. In particular the Beatles movie A Hard Day's Night and fashions from Carnaby Street led American media to proclaim England as the centre of the music and fashion world. The success of British acts of the time caused American garage rock bands subsequently to change their sound and style. The influence continued on subsequent groups such as Big Star, Sparks and Todd Rundgren amongst others. The emergence of relatively homogeneous worldwide rock music styles about 1967 marked the end of the "invasion".

=== British blues boom ===
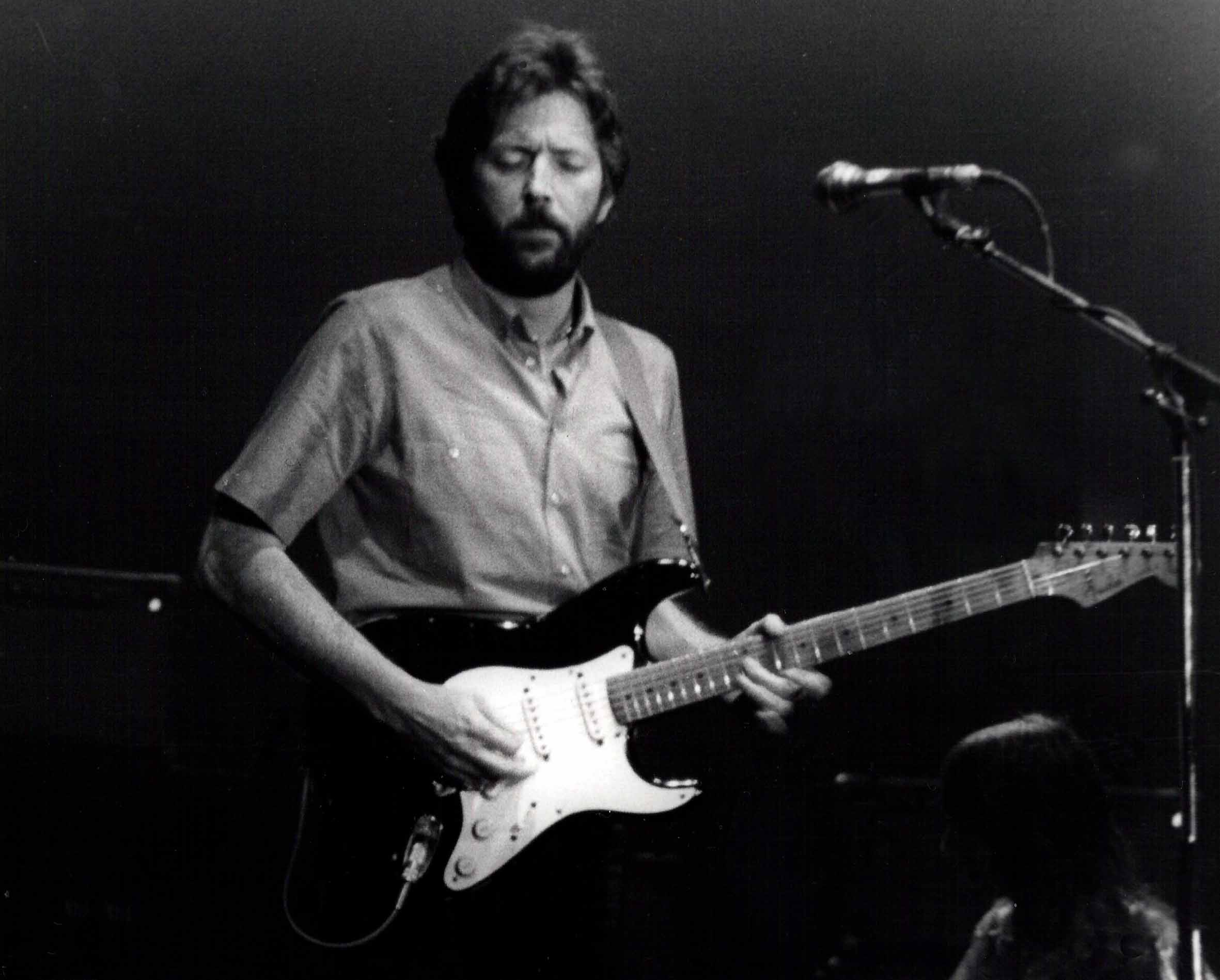
Eric Clapton in 1974

In parallel with Beat music, in the late 1950s and early 1960s a British blues scene was developing recreating the sounds of American R&B and later particularly the sounds of bluesmen Robert Johnson, Howling Wolf and Muddy Waters. It reached its height of mainstream popularity in the 1960s, when it developed a distinctive and influential style dominated by electric guitar and made international stars of several proponents of the genre including the Jimi Hendrix Experience, Cream (featuring Eric Clapton), the Rolling Stones, the Yardbirds, Fleetwood Mac and Led Zeppelin. A number of these moved through blues-rock to different forms of rock music and as a result British blues helped to form many of the subgenres of rock, including psychedelic rock and heavy metal music. Since then direct interest in the blues in Britain has declined, but many of the key performers have returned to it in recent years, new acts have emerged and there have been a renewed interest in the genre.

=== Folk rock ===
British folk musicians of the early 60s were heavily influenced by American revival artists like Woody Guthrie, Pete Seeger and later Bob Dylan and Joan Baez. This led indirectly to the subgenre of British progressive folk music, pioneered by performers like the Scottish Incredible String Band from 1967 and the distinctive folk baroque guitar style of players like Davy Graham, Martin Carthy, John Renbourn and Bert Jansch. Many progressive folk performers continued to retain a traditional element in their music, including Jansch and Renbourn, who with Jacqui McShee, Danny Thompson, and Terry Cox, formed Pentangle in 1967. Others totally abandoned the traditional element and in this area particularly important were the Scottish artists Donovan (who was most influenced by emerging progressive folk musicians in America like Bob Dylan) and the Incredible String Band, who from 1967 incorporated a range of influences including medieval and eastern music into their compositions. Some of this, particularly the Incredible String Band, has been seen as developing into the further subgenre of psych or psychedelic folk and had a considerable impact on progressive and psychedelic rock. There was a brief flowering of British progressive folk in the late 1960s and early 1970s, with groups like the Third Ear Band and Quintessence following the eastern Indian musical and more abstract work by group such as Comus, Dando Shaft, Trees, Spirogyra, Forest, and Jan Dukes De Grey, but commercial success was elusive for these bands and most had broken off, or moved in very different directions, by about 1973. From about 1967 there were also a number British bands, like Fairport Convention, who were directly influenced by American acts like the Byrds to play folk music on electric instruments.

=== British psychedelia ===
Psychedelic music is inspired or influenced by psychedelic culture and attempts to replicate and enhance the mind-altering experiences of hallucinogenic drugs. It particularly grew out of blues-rock and progressive folk music and drew on non-Western sources such as Indian music's ragas and sitars as well as studio effects and long instrumental passages and surreal lyrics. It emerged during the mid-1960s among progressive folk bands in Britain and the United States and rapidly moved into rock and pop music being taken up by acts including the Beatles, the Yardbirds, Cream and Pink Floyd. Psychedelic rock bridged the transition from early blues-rock to progressive rock, art rock, experimental rock, hard rock and eventually heavy metal that would become major genres in the 1970s.

== Pop music ==
Around 1967, in the aftermath of the British Invasion, as blues-rock, emerging folk rock and some beat bands, including the Beatles, veered towards a more serious forms of music, with an emphasis on meaning, virtuosity and orientated towards the albums market, the term pop music began to be applied to rock and roll based music with more commercial aims, often with inconsequential lyrics, particularly simple love songs, and orientated towards the singles chart, continuing the tradition of traditional pop. Although some bands occupied territory that crossed the emerging rock/pop divide and were able to produce successes in both camps, including the Beatles and Rolling Stones, the British pop genre in the late 1960s would be dominated by individual singers like Sandie Shaw.

== See also ==
- 1960s in music
- Early British popular music
- Freakbeat
- Mod (subculture)
- Music Hall
- Music of the United Kingdom (1950s)
- Music of the United Kingdom (1970s)
- Music of the United Kingdom (1980s)
- Music of the United Kingdom (1990s)
- Music of the United Kingdom (2000s)
- Swinging London
