= Age of Consent (band) =

English band

- Origin: London, England
- Genres: EDM; indie pop; gothic pop
- Years active: 2010–2014
- Label: Inside Animals
- Members: Joe Reeves; Darren Cullen
- Website: https://ageofconsent.bandcamp.com/

Age of Consent is an English band from London, England. The indie pop duo consists of Joe Reeves and Darren Cullen who both started the band a year after the disbandment of their first group, Shitdisco, a Glasgow-based dance-punk band. The band is named after the song of the same name by New Order. Reeves and Cullen play a version of electronic dance music considered to fall under the gothic pop label and their self-described sound is considered "guitar-crazy and danceable" The band became well-known when their music was featured in the 2013 hit video game, Grand Theft Auto V. The game features two songs by the band including "Colours", an original song written for the game and is featured on the game's soundtrack, and their 2012 second single "Heartbreak" both featured in the in-game's indie radio station Radio Mirror Park.

== History ==
After the break-up of Shitdisco in 2009, Reeves and Cullen both knew that they still wanted to work together in a musical capacity, as they had known one another for more than a decade, both playing music and attending art school together. "The idea of who we're going to work with is pretty obvious, but like, I think we didn't know," Reeves said. "When we left Shitdisco, it was like, all we wanted to do was have a bit of a break, like have a bit of a time off making music for awhile." Once this new collaboration began, sometime in the end of 2010, the aim of the music underwent an interesting development. "In the beginning…all I wanted to do was the opposite of Shitdisco," Reeves explained. "And then after awhile, I realized actually what we do in Shitdisco is what I like doing as a musician"

As for Cullen, he knew that he always wanted to make dance music in some kind of capacity. However, there was a fine line dividing what they did in Shitdisco versus what they wanted to do in Age of Consent, and he knew it was important that the two better define those boundaries. The challenge, then, has not been to recreate the sound of Shitdisco, nor has it been to do something entirely different, but rather to compile the elements of the former project that they loved and place those into Age of Consent, mixing them along with new ideas.

In January 2011, the two played their first show in Berlin, a handful of months after the release of their first single, "The Beach". Yet although the song came out in September 2011, the seeds of it were first planted years prior, when the two were jamming at a Shitdisco band practice and when the two began to do music together again, this incomplete track seemed as good a starting point as ever, particularly because Reeves marks it as the transition point, or "the thing that happened between the two bands."

In December 2012, the Age of Consent released their second single, "Heartbreak". The single includes the song, as well as five unique remixes of it, and a cover of a song by Suicide.

In 2013, the band's songs "Colours" and "Heartbreak" were featured in the video game Grand Theft Auto V in the indie radio station Radio Mirror Park.
