= Shitdisco =

Scottish dance-punk band

- Origin: Glasgow, Scotland
- Genres: New rave, dance-rock, electronic rock
- Years active: 2003–2009
- Labels: Fierce Panda Records (UK); Sony Music (Japan); Dim Mak (U.S.); Nocturne (France)
- Past members: Joel Stone; Joe Reeves; Darren Cullen; Tom Straughan; Jan Lee
- Website: Official Website; Myspace page

Shitdisco were a dance-punk band from Glasgow, Scotland. They formed in 2003 while studying at the Glasgow School of Art, consisting of Joel Stone (bass, guitar, vocals), Joe Reeves (bass, guitar, vocals), Jan Lee (keyboards, backing vocals) and Darren Cullen (drums). The band's first single "Disco Blood"/"I Know Kung Fu" was released in December 2005. Signed to record label Fierce Panda, their debut album Kingdom of Fear was released on 16 April 2007.

The group have been compared to Talking Heads and The Rapture, but admitted influences ranging from Donna Summer, Arthur Russel and The Prodigy to Gang of Four and The Clash. Since the release of "Disco Blood"/"I Know Kung Fu" the band toured extensively in the UK and Europe, even playing as far afield as Bangkok and Istanbul. In 2007 they signed to Sony Music in Japan and Dim Mak Records in America.

The members of the group produced two tracks for Japanese new-wave unit 80_pan's 2008 album, Disco Baby.

Jan Lee left the band in January 2008 to concentrate on his career as an illustrator, and later also entered the restaurant business. He was replaced by Tom Straughan, similarly on keyboards and backing vocals.

In 2009 the band split after mutual agreement. Members went on to form the bands Age of Consent and Ubre Blanca, while drummer Darren Cullen has also pursued a career in political art.

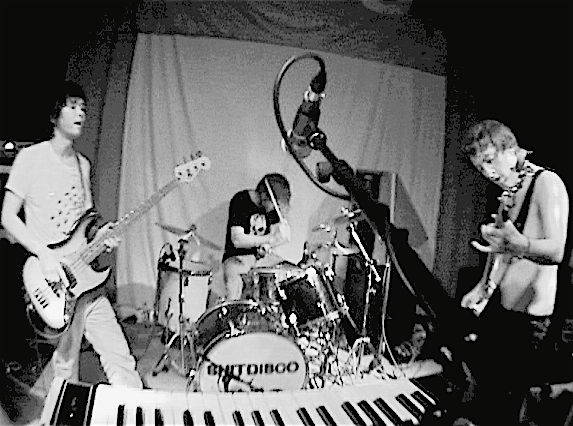
Shitdisco

== Album ==
The band began recording their debut album Kingdom of Fear at The Premises recording studio in London with former Clor guitarist turned producer Luke Smith. He had previously worked with the band producing remixes for "Disco Blood" & "Reactor Party".

The album was to be recorded in two sessions, with the 2nd session taking place after the band had completed the NME New Rave Tour (Oct 2006) supporting Klaxons. During the tour however, after a gig in Birmingham, drummer Darren Cullen fell from the roof of the band's tour bus, breaking his right wrist, requiring an operation and the fitting of a metal plate. For the second recording session Kieron Pepper, live drummer for The Prodigy, was brought in to play on two tracks, "Fear of the Future" and "Dream of Infinity". The album also featured the song "Reactor Party" which was produced by Alan O'Connell.

Kingdom of Fear, named after the last book by American writer Hunter S. Thompson, was released on 16 April 2007 on Fierce Panda Records.

== DJ career ==
In addition to live performances, the band have become well known for their regular DJ sets, playing from the likes of Bugged Out, Gatecrasher & Modular parties in the UK to Judgement Sundays in Ibiza, a recent North American DJ tour and extensively in the Far East.

== Discography ==
=== Albums ===
- Kingdom of Fear (16 April 2007)
- The Emanator – US release of Kingdom of Fear with extra tracks (23 September 2008)

=== Singles ===
- "Disco Blood"/"I Know Kung Fu" (2005) (1,000 copies)
- "Reactor Party" (2006) UK #73
- "OK" (2007) (2,000 copies)
- "I Know Kung Fu" (2007)

=== Compilations ===
- "Disco Blood" – On Delete Yourself compilation Digital Penetration (July 2006)
- "Reactor Party" – On Neon Nights Mixtape – DMC (June 2007)
- "Reactor Party" – On The Bang Gang DJs "Light Sound Dance" – Modular Records (July 2007)
- "Reactor Party" – On Ibiza Rocks 2007 – Ministry of Sound (August 2007)

== See also ==
- Post-punk revival
- Dance-punk
- Bolt Action Five

== Reviews ==
- Daily Music Guide Interview
- Album Review, Kingdom of Fear - NME.com
- Album Review - From NG Magazine
- Album Review on The Line Of Best Fit
- Review, March 2006 in Edinburgh - from The Scotsman
- Review, 16/03/06 @ The Barfly, Liverpool - from gigwise online
- Supersweet interview
