= Music of the United Kingdom (1950s) =

Overview of music in the UK in the 1950s

Music of the United Kingdom began to develop in the 1950s; from largely insular and derivative forms to become one of the leading centres of popular music in the modern world. By 1950 indigenous forms of British popular music, including folk music, brass and silver bands, music hall and dance bands, were already giving way to the influence of American forms of music including jazz, swing and traditional pop, mediated through film and records.

The significant change of the mid-1950s was the impact of American rock and roll, which provided a new model for performance and recording, based on a youth market. Initially this was dominated by American acts, or re-creations of American forms of music, but soon distinctly British forms began to appear, first in the uniquely British take on American folk music in the skiffle craze of the 1950s with artists such as Lonnie Donegan, then in the beginnings of a folk revival that came to place an emphasis on national traditions and then in early attempts to produce British rock and roll such as Cliff Richard & the Shadows' Move It, often cited at the first British rock and roll record.

== Jazz ==
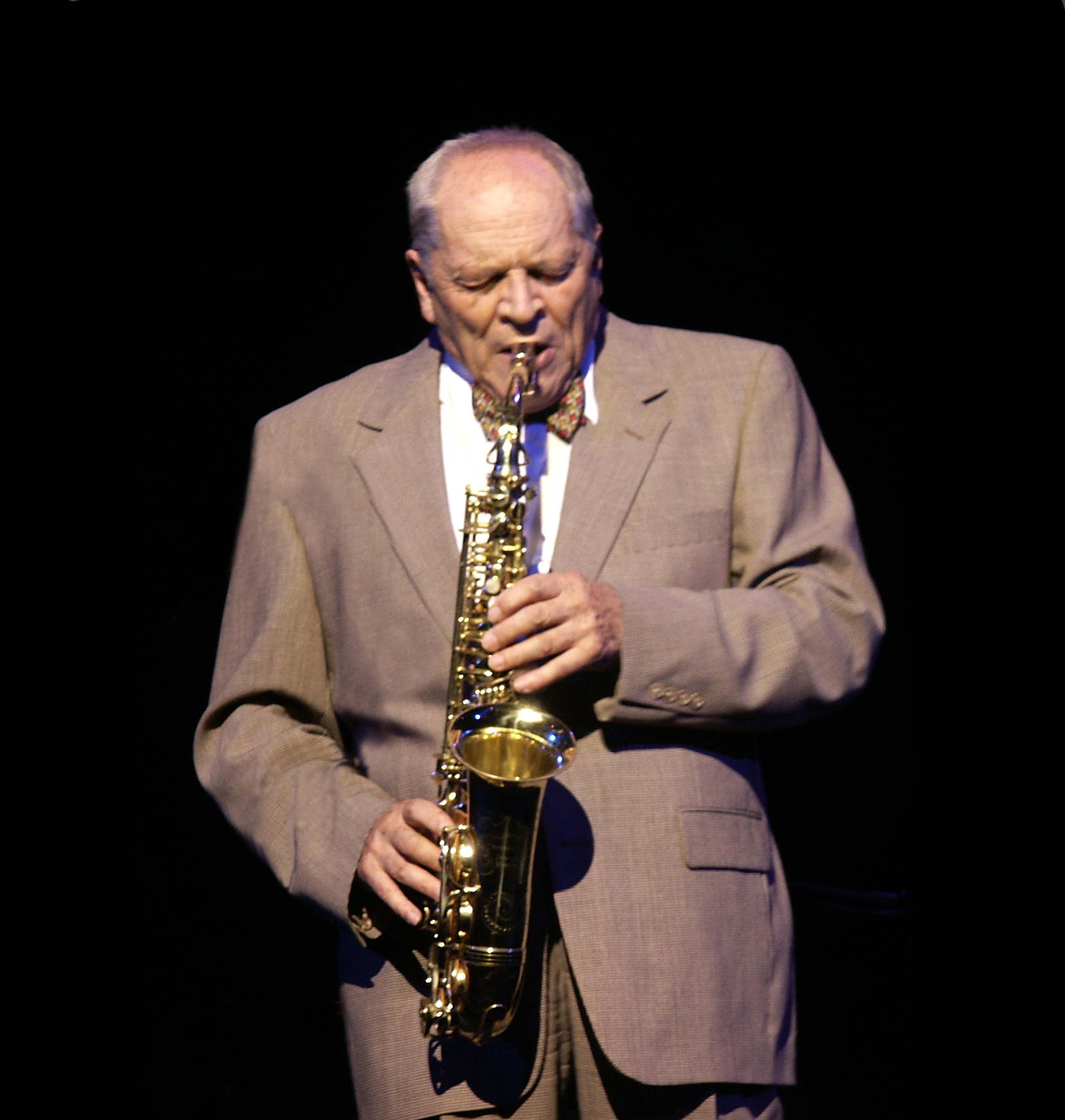
John Dankworth performing on stage in 2002

Jazz reached Britain from America through recordings and performers who visited the country while it was a relatively new genre, soon after the end of the First World War. Jazz began to be played by British musicians from the 1930s and on a widespread basis in the 1940s, often within dance bands. From the late 1950s British "modern jazz", highly influenced by American bebop, began to emerge, led by figures such as John Dankworth and Ronnie Scott, while Ken Colyer, George Webb and Humphrey Lyttelton emphasised New Orleans, trad jazz. Scott's Soho club became a focal point of British jazz, seeing the best of British and international acts. From the 1960s British Jazz began to develop more individual characteristics, absorbing a variety of influences, including free jazz, British blues, as well as European and world music.

== Traditional pop ==
In the early 1950s sales of American records dominated British popular music. In the first full year of the charts in 1953 major artists were Perry Como, Guy Mitchell and Frankie Laine largely with orchestrated sentimental ballads, beside novelty records such as "(How Much Is) That Doggie in the Window?" re-recorded by British artist Lita Roza. Some established British wartime stars such as Vera Lynn were still able to chart into the mid-1950s, but successful new British acts such as Jimmy Young who had two number one hits in 1955, did so with re-recorded versions of American songs "Unchained Melody" and "The Man from Laramie" or Alma Cogan with "Dreamboat". Many successful songs were the product of films, including number ones for Doris Day in 1954 with "Secret Love" from Calamity Jane and for Frank Sinatra with the title song from Three Coins in the Fountain, underlining the dominance of American culture in both film and music at this time, and arguably providing a mechanism for the transference of rock and roll.

== Skiffle ==
Skiffle is a type of folk music with jazz, blues and country influences, usually using homemade or improvised instruments, which had originated as a term in the United States in the first half of the 20th century. It became popular again in Britain in the 1950s, where it was associated with musician Lonnie Donegan, whose high-tempo version of Leadbelly's "Rock Island Line" was a major hit in 1956, spending eight months in the Top 20, peaking at No. 6 (and No. 8 in the U.S.). It was the first début record to go gold in Britain, selling over a million copies worldwide. The resulting short-lived skiffle craze led to a profusion of British performers and played a major part in beginning the careers of later eminent jazz, pop, blues, folk and rock musicians, including early British rock performers Tommy Steele, the Shadows and the Beatles.

== Folk music and roots revival ==
The second British folk revival followed a similar American folk music revival, to which it was connected by individuals such as Alan Lomax, who had moved to Britain in the era of McCarthyism and who worked in England and Scotland. Like the American revival, it was often overtly left wing in its politics and the leading figures, Ewan MacColl and A. L. Lloyd, were both involved in trade unionism and socialist politics. In Scotland the key figures were Hamish Henderson and Calum McLean who collected songs and popularised acts including Jeannie Robertson, John Strachan, Flora Macneill and Jimmy MacBeath. In Wales the key figure was Dafydd Iwan, who founded the Sain record label in 1969. The revival began to gain momentum in the 1950s with the establishment of a network of folk clubs, such as the Blues and Ballads Club in London in 1953 and a number of festivals, such as that at Sidmouth from 1955.

== British rock and roll ==
The emergence of American rock and roll as a major international force in popular music in the mid-1950s led to its emulation in Britain, which shared a common language and many cultural connections. The British product has generally been considered inferior to the American version of the genre, and made very little international or lasting impact. However, it was important in establishing British youth and popular music culture and was a key factor in subsequent developments that led to the 'British Invasion' of the mid-1960s. Since the 1960s some stars of the genre, most notably Cliff Richard, have managed to sustain very successful careers and there have been periodic revivals of this form of music.

== See also ==
- 1950s in music
- Early British popular music
- Music of the United Kingdom (1960s)
- Music of the United Kingdom (1970s)
- Music of the United Kingdom (1980s)
- Music of the United Kingdom (1990s)
- Music of the United Kingdom (2000s)
