= Music of the United Kingdom (1990s) =

Popular music of the United Kingdom in the 1990s continued to develop and diversify. While the singles charts were dominated by boy bands and girl groups, British soul and Indian-based music also enjoyed their greatest level of mainstream success to date, and the rise of World music helped revitalise the popularity of folk music. Electronic rock bands like The Prodigy and The Chemical Brothers began to achieve a high profile. Alternative rock reached the mainstream, emerging from the Madchester scene to produce dream pop, shoegazing, post-rock and indie pop, which led to the commercial success of Britpop bands like Blur and Oasis; followed by a stream of post-Britpop bands like Radiohead and The Verve.

== Rock ==
=== Madchester ===
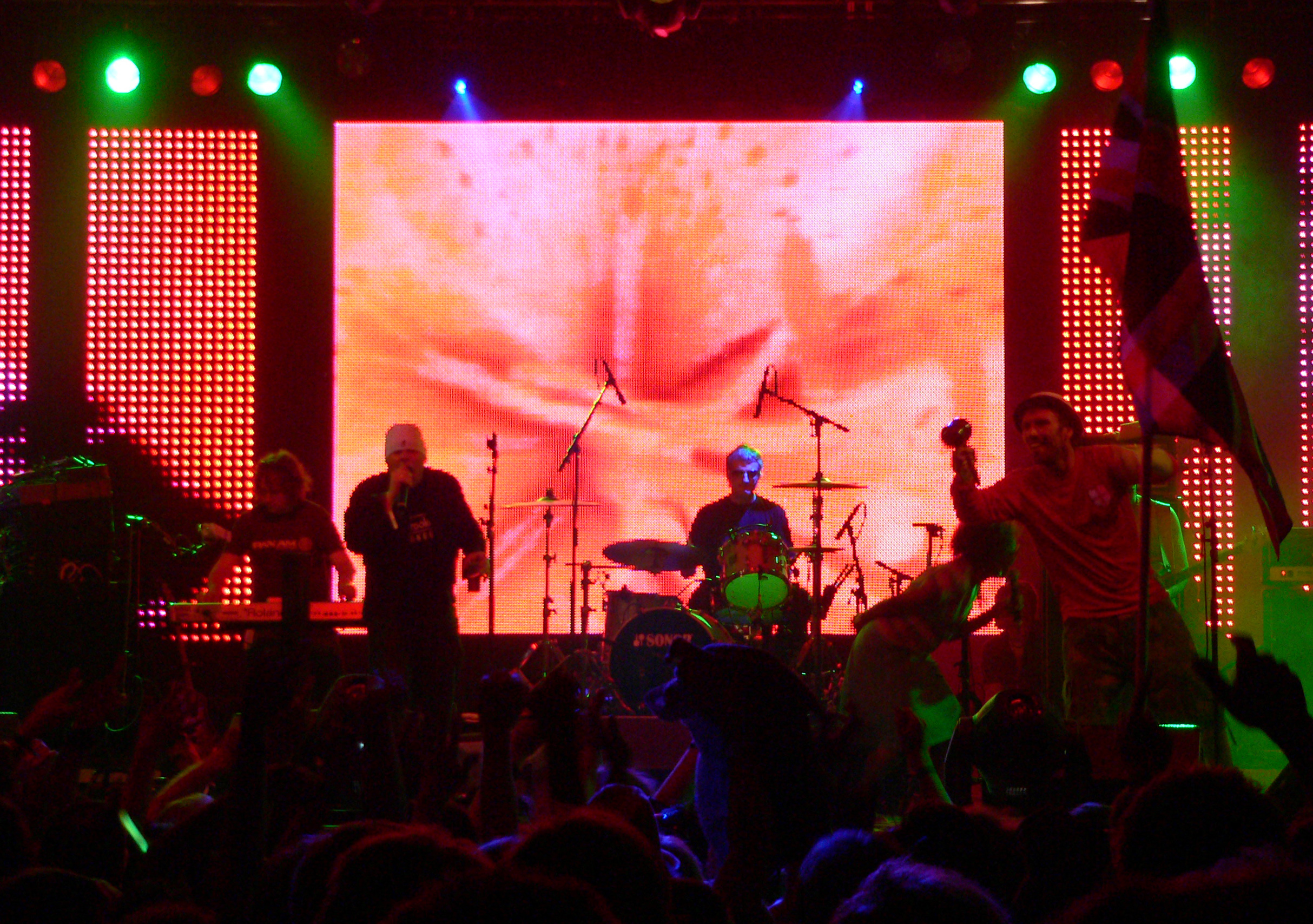
Happy Mondays in concert in 2006

The independent rock scene that had developed in Manchester in the second half of the 1980s, based in The Haçienda nightclub and around Factory Records, dubbed Madchester, came to national prominence at the end of the decade, with the Happy Mondays, the Inspiral Carpets, and the Stone Roses charting late in 1989. The scene became the centre of media attention for independent rock in the early 1990s, with bands like World of Twist, New Fast Automatic Daffodils, The High, Northside, Paris Angels, and Intastella also gaining national attention. The period of dominance was relatively short lived with The Stone Roses beginning to retreat from public performance while engaged in contractual disputes, the Happy Mondays having difficulty in producing a second album and Factory Records going bankrupt in 1992. Local bands catching the tail-end of Madchester, such as The Mock Turtles, became part of a wider baggy scene. The music press in the UK began to place more focus on shoegazing bands from the south of England and bands emerging through US grunge.

=== Dream pop and shoegazing ===
Dream pop had developed out of the indie rock scene of the 1980s, when bands like Cocteau Twins, The Chameleons, The Passions, Dif Juz, Lowlife and A.R. Kane began fusing post-punk and ethereal experiments with bittersweet pop melodies into sensual, sonically ambitious soundscapes. The 4AD record label is the one most associated with dream pop, though others such as Creation, Projekt, Fontana, Bedazzled, Vernon Yard, and Slumberland also released significant records in the genre. A louder, more aggressive strain of dream pop came to be known as shoegazing; key bands of this style were Lush, Slowdive, My Bloody Valentine, Alison's Halo, Chapterhouse, Curve and Levitation. These bands kept the atmospheric qualities of dream pop, but added the intensity of post-punk-influenced bands such as The Chameleons and Sonic Youth.

=== Indie pop ===
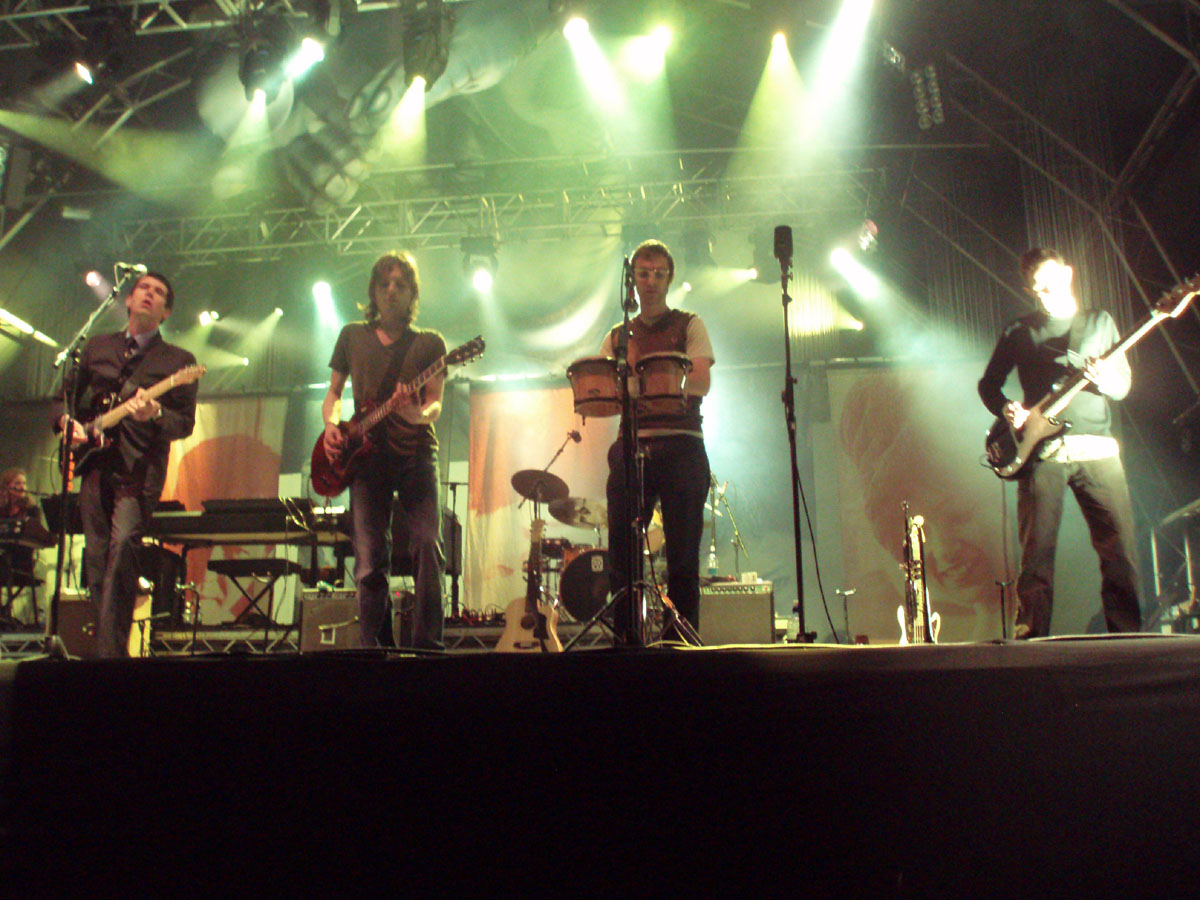
Belle & Sebastian

Initially dubbed 'C86' after the 1986 NME tape, and also known as "cutie", "shambling bands" and later as "twee pop", indie pop was characterised by jangling guitars, a love of sixties pop and often fey, innocent lyrics. It was inspired by the DIY scene of punk, with a thriving fanzine, label and club and gig circuit, but tended to eschew punk's nihilism and aggression. Early bands included The Pastels, Talulah Gosh and Primal Scream, and among the most commercially successful were Belle and Sebastian.

=== Post rock ===
Post rock originated in the release of Talk Talk's album Laughing Stock and US band Slint's Spiderland, both in 1991, which produced experimental work influenced by sources as varied as electronica, jazz, and minimalist classical music, often abandoning the traditional song format in favour of instrumental and ambient music. The term was first used to describe the band Bark Psychosis and their album Hex (1994), but was soon employed for bands such as Stereolab, Laika, Disco Inferno and Pram and other acts in America and Canada. Scottish group Mogwai were among some of the influential post-rock groups to arise at the turn of the 21st century.

=== Britpop ===
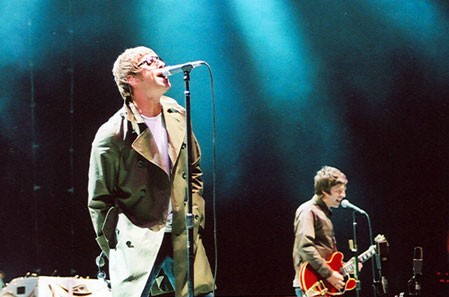
Oasis is considered to be the most commercially successful British rock act of the decade.

Britpop emerged from the British indie scene of the early 1990s and was characterised by bands influenced by British guitar pop music of the 1960s and 1970s. The movement developed as a reaction against various musical and cultural trends in the late 1980s and early 1990s, particularly the grunge phenomenon from the United States. New British groups such as Suede and Blur launched the movement by positioning themselves as opposing musical forces, referencing British guitar music of the past and writing about uniquely British topics and concerns. These bands were soon joined by others including Oasis, Pulp, Supergrass and Elastica. Britpop groups brought British indie rock into the mainstream and formed the backbone of a larger British cultural movement called Cool Britannia. Although its more popular bands were able to spread their commercial success overseas, especially to the United States, the movement largely fell apart by the end of the decade.

=== Post-Britpop ===
By 1999, as dissatisfaction grew with the concept of Cool Britannia, and Britpop as a movement began to dissolve, emerging bands began to avoid the Britpop label while still producing music derived from it. Many of these bands tended to mix elements of British traditional rock (or British trad rock), particularly The Beatles, The Rolling Stones and Small Faces, with American influences, including post-grunge. Post-Britpop bands like The Verve, Radiohead, Travis, Stereophonics and Feeder, achieved much wider international success than most of the Britpop groups that had preceded them, and were some of the most commercially successful acts of the late 1990s.

== Pop ==
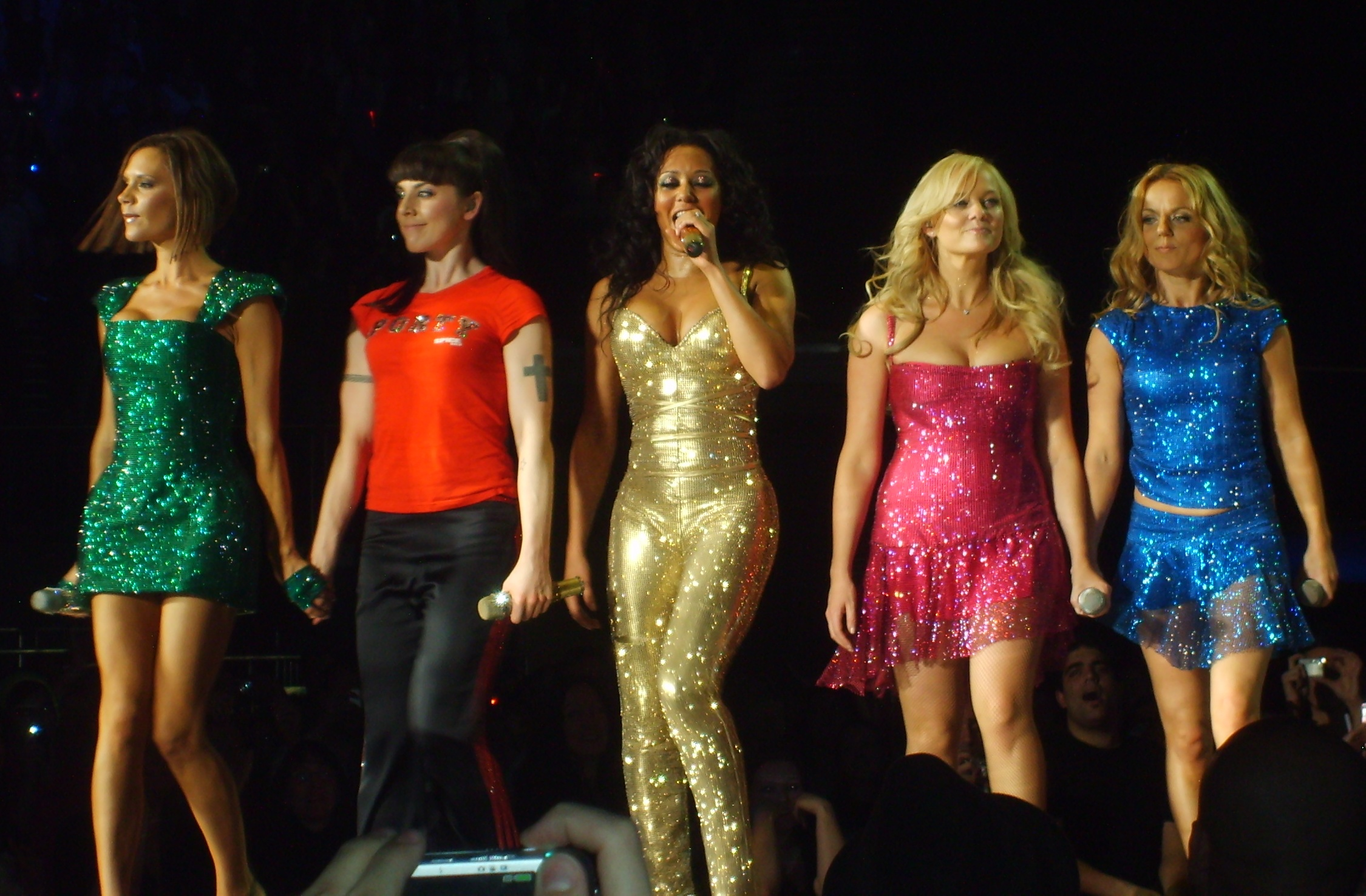
Spice Girls one of the biggest British pop acts of the 1990s. They had a #1 Billboard Hot 100 hit with Wannabe

The success of American boy band New Kids on the Block from about 1989, led to replica acts in the UK, including Nigel Martin-Smith's Take That and East 17, competing with Irish bands Westlife and Boyzone. Soon after, girl groups began to reappear, like the R&B act Eternal, who achieved a string of international hits from 1993. The most successful and influential act of the genre were the Spice Girls, who added well-aimed publicity and the ideology of girl power to their pop careers. They had nine number 1 singles in the UK and US, including "Wannabe", "2 Become 1" and "Spice Up Your Life" from 1996. They were followed by British groups like All Saints, who had five number 1 hits in the UK and two multi-platinum albums. By the end of the century the grip of boy bands on the charts was faltering, but proved the basis for solo careers like that of Robbie Williams, formerly of Take That, who achieved seven Number One singles in the UK between 1998 and 2012.

== Electronic music ==
=== UK garage ===
UK garage originated from England, particularly in London in the early 1990s and emerged from styles such as garage house, R&B, jungle, and dance-pop, and usually features a distinctive 4/4 percussive rhythm with syncopated hi-hats, cymbals and snares, and sometimes includes irregular kick drum patterns. Garage tracks also commonly feature 'chopped up' and time-stretched or pitch-shifted vocal samples complementing the underlying rhythmic structure at a tempo usually around 130 BPM. UK garage gave rise to subgenres such as speed garage and 2-step, and was then largely subsumed into other styles of music and production in the mid-2000s, including grime, bassline and dubstep. The decline of UK garage during the mid-2000s saw the birth of UK funky, which is closely related.

=== Drum and bass ===
Drum and bass emerged from the London breakbeat hardcore and rave scene of the late 1980s. Originally known as jungle, it was a pop-created fusion of hardcore, house and techno which was usually instrumental, using extremely fast polyrhythms and breakbeats and incorporating elements from dancehall, electro, funk, hip hop, house, jazz, heavy metal. Pioneered by figures like Club Rage DJs Fabio and Grooverider, in the mid-1990s the genre expanded from an underground and pirate radio scene to form subgenres including the intelligent drum and bass pioneered by LTJ Bukem, and the ambient jungle of Goldie's crossover debut Timeless (1995) and the jazzstep of Roni Size's Mercury Award-winning New Forms (1997). Subsequent artists included Shy FX, Ed Rush, 4hero and DJ Rap, some fusing drum and bass with influences from jazz, film music, ambient and trip-hop.

=== Trip hop ===
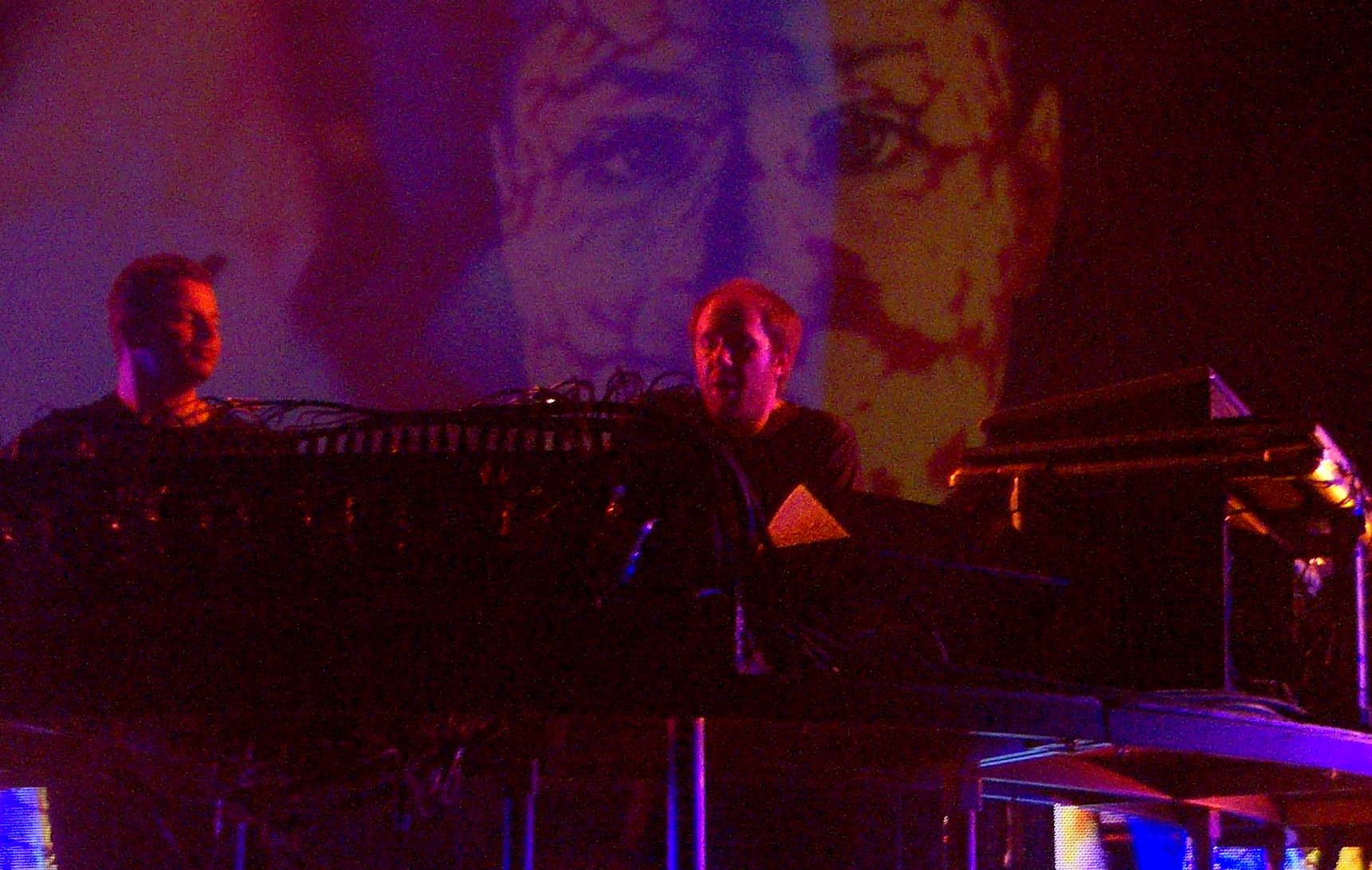
The Chemical Brothers performing live, 2005.

In the early 1990s, dance music saw more exposure at rock music festivals like Glastonbury and Reading. Raves, many illegal, continued to be organised and the tension caused by police attention, new putative legislation aimed at organisers, and the increase of harder music, led many dance music fans to return to legal night clubs, where rave music had given way to progressive house. Other clubs emerged to play the ever-splintering genres associated with the house music and rave scene, including hardcore techno, downtempo and trance, drum and bass and happy hardcore. The Bristol scene saw the development of trip hop, which mixed house and hip hop producing successful bands such as Massive Attack and Portishead. The 1990s also saw the development and refinement of IDM (Intelligent Dance Music), which borrowed from forms such as techno, drum and bass, and acid house music and introduced more abstract elements, including heavy use of digital signal processing. Among the most commercially successful products of these scenes were acts like The Prodigy, The Chemical Brothers and Fatboy Slim.

== Metal ==
Extreme metal bands were rarely covered in mainstream media and rarely appeared on television. Part of what separated the British metal music of the 1990s was a sense of a humor and irony that was not as nearly widespread as the European and American metal groups of the era. Even among the more 'serious' British groups such as Carcass or Gorerotted have displayed a tongue-in-cheek attitude.

The British extreme metal scene produced bands of worldwide significance and popularity such as Cradle of Filth. Other metal oriented media that originated in the United Kingdom included magazines such as Terrorizer which have a reputation worldwide.

== Hip hop ==
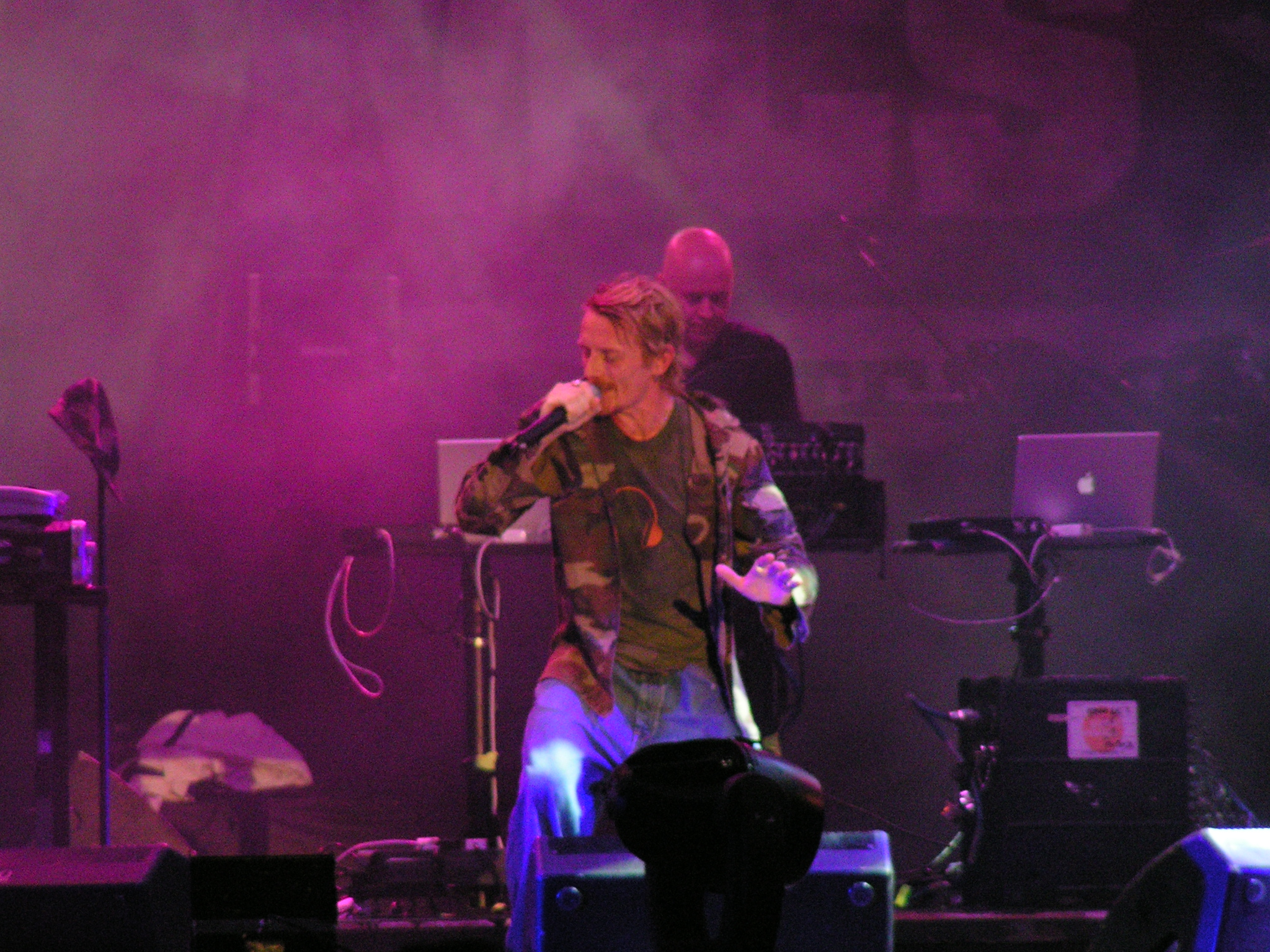
Stereo MCs at the Orange Music Experience Festival, Haifa, 2005

By the early 1990s the British hip hop seemed to be thriving, with flourishing scenes in London, Bristol and Nottingham. British rap became more assured of its identity, abandoning American accents and developing a more distinctive sound. However, the anticipated mainstream success was not achieved, with the British hip hop scene particularly affected by the record industry clamping down on sampling. The result was the development of the breakbeat culture, searching out obscure recordings and the creation of original music, with bands like Stereo MC's beginning to playing instruments and sampling their own tunes. Arguably this led to a creative renaissance, with British hip hop shifting from the hardcore American template and moving into more melodic territory.

== Soul ==
After Soul II Soul's breakthrough R&B hits "Keep on Movin'" and "Back to Life" in 1989, existing black soul acts, including Omar and acid jazz bands Incognito, Jamiroquai, and The Brand New Heavies, were able to pursue mainstream recording careers. Particularly noticeable was the proliferation of British female black singers including Mica Paris, Caron Wheeler, Gabrielle and Heather Small.

== Folk resurgence ==
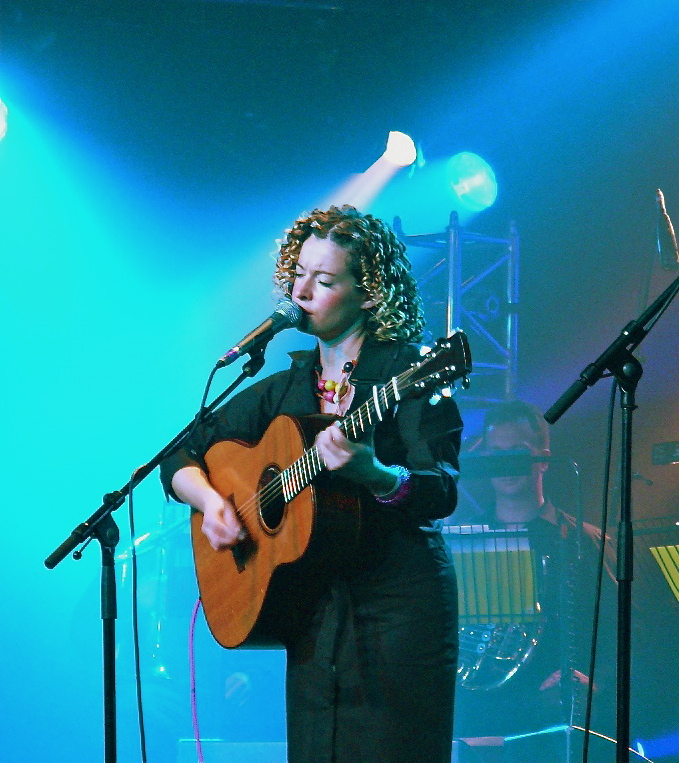
Kate Rusby on stage.

Traditional folk music, having been in a slow decline from mainstream popularity since the 1970s, began to enjoy a resurgence in the 1990s, benefiting from the more general interest in World music. The arrival, and sometimes mainstream success, of acts like Martyn Bennett, Kate Rusby, Nancy Kerr, Kathryn Tickell, Spiers and Boden, Blazin' Fiddles, Eliza Carthy, Runrig and Capercaillie, all largely concerned with acoustic performance of traditional material, marked a radical turn around in the fortunes of British folk music. This was reflected in the adoption creation of the BBC Radio 2 Folk Awards in 2000 and the profile for folk music was as high as it had been for over thirty years.

== Post-Bhangra ==
Following the establishment of thriving south Asian music scenes in the 1980s, the 1990s saw Indian music reach the mainstream, particularly through a series of "post-Bhangra" fusions. A mix of Bhangra and reggae beats helped make Apache Indian the first British south Asian pop star, reaching number 5 in the UK singles charts with "Boom Shack-A-Lak" in 1990 and becoming the first south Asian DJ on a major national station in 1994. The album Migration (1994) by Nitin Sawhney fused flamenco and other genres with Bhangra. By 1997 Indian music artists such as Talvin Singh had become mainstream stars in the UK. In 1998 Cornershop, reached number 1 in the singles charts with a version of "Brimful of Asha" remixed by Fatboy Slim.

== Declining American popularity and increasing divergence with US styles ==
By the latter half of the decade, British music was declining in popularity in the United States. Oasis and Blur were not considered phenomenons but one-hit wonders stateside. Various Electronica styles were less well received in America than at home while genres that were popular in the United States such as nu metal were not picked up by UK artists. British "quirkiness" and regional sensibilities that once were considered strengths there were now considered weakness by the increasingly oligarchic American music industry that was interested in marketing to young teens.

== See also ==
- 1990s in music
- Music of the United Kingdom (1950s)
- Music of the United Kingdom (1960s)
- Music of the United Kingdom (1970s)
- Music of the United Kingdom (1980s)
- Music of the United Kingdom (2000s and 2010s)
