= Early British popular music =

Commercial music between about 1600 and 1960

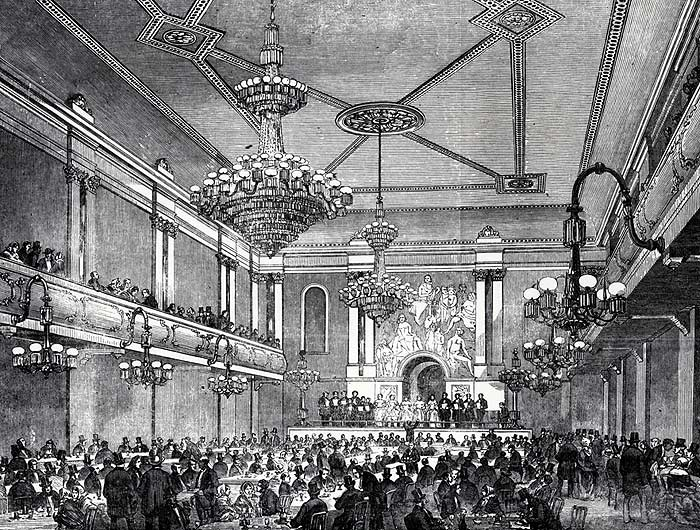
Interior of the Canterbury Hall, an early example of a music hall, opened 1852 in Lambeth.

Early British popular music, in the sense of commercial music enjoyed by the people, can be seen to originate in the 16th and 17th centuries with the arrival of the broadside ballad as a result of the print revolution, which were sold cheaply and in great numbers until the 19th century. Further technological, economic and social changes led to new forms of music in the 19th century, including the brass band, which produced a popular and communal form of classical music. Similarly, the music hall sprang up to cater for the entertainment of new urban societies, adapting existing forms of music to produce popular songs and acts. In the 1930s, the influence of American Jazz led to the creation of British dance bands, who provided a social and popular music that began to dominate social occasions and the radio airwaves.

== Broadside ballads ==
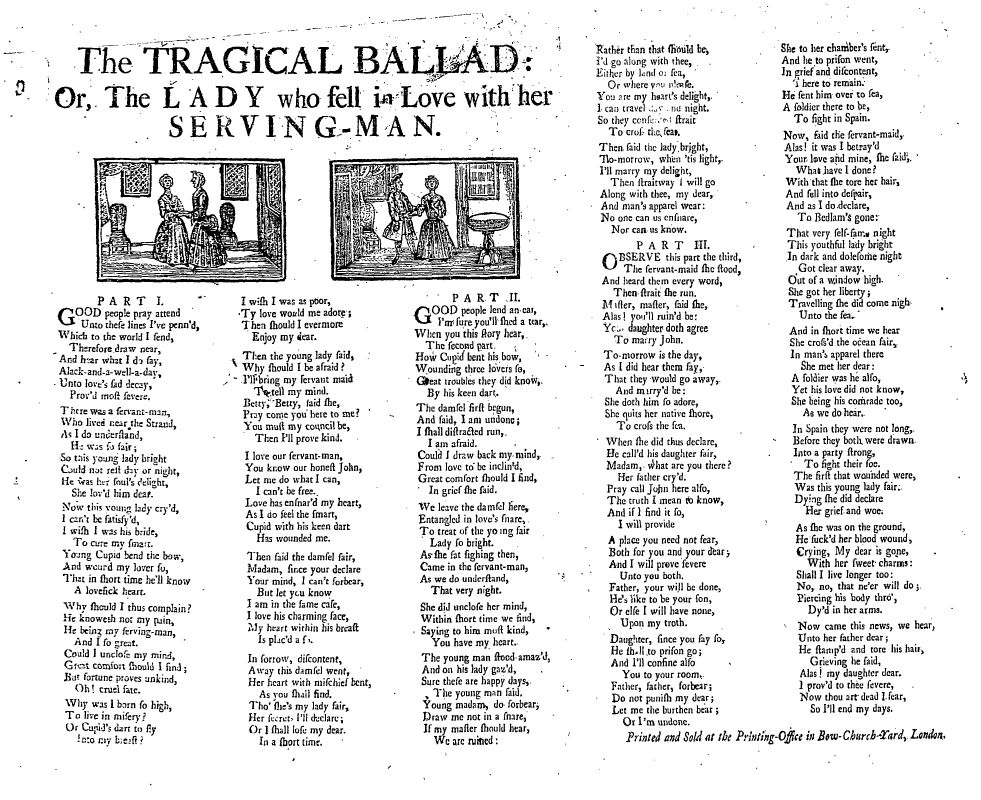
An 18th century broadside ballad

Broadside ballads were arguably the first form of commercial popular music in Britain. They were a product of the development of cheap print from the 16th century. They were generally printed on one side of a large sheet of poor quality paper. This could also be cut in half lengthways to make ‘broadslips’, or folded to make chapbooks. They were produced in huge numbers, with over 400,000 being sold in England annually by the 1660s. Many were sold by travelling chapmen in city streets or at fairs. The subject matter varied from what has been defined as the traditional ballad, although many traditional ballads were printed as broadsides. Among the topics were love, religion, drinking-songs, legends and early journalism, which included disasters, political events and signs, wonders and prodigies.

== Brass bands ==
Although most of the instruments used by British brass bands had existed and had been used together for some time, they only became a mass activity in the 1840s and 1850s out of village, church and military bands. Brass bands were a response to the process of industrialisation, which produced a large working class population, technological advancements, including more efficient piston valve instruments, which were easier to play and more accurate, and mass production that could quickly produce and distribute the instruments. Arguably, brass bands were an expression of the local solidarity and aspirations of newly formed or rapidly growing communities. This was particularly expressed in the rapid growth and organisation of bands, clearly seen in the creation of brass band competitions by the late 1850s. Brass bands probably reached their peak of popularity in the early decades of the 20th century, when, it has been estimated, there were over 20,000 brass band instrumentalists in the country.

== Parlour music ==
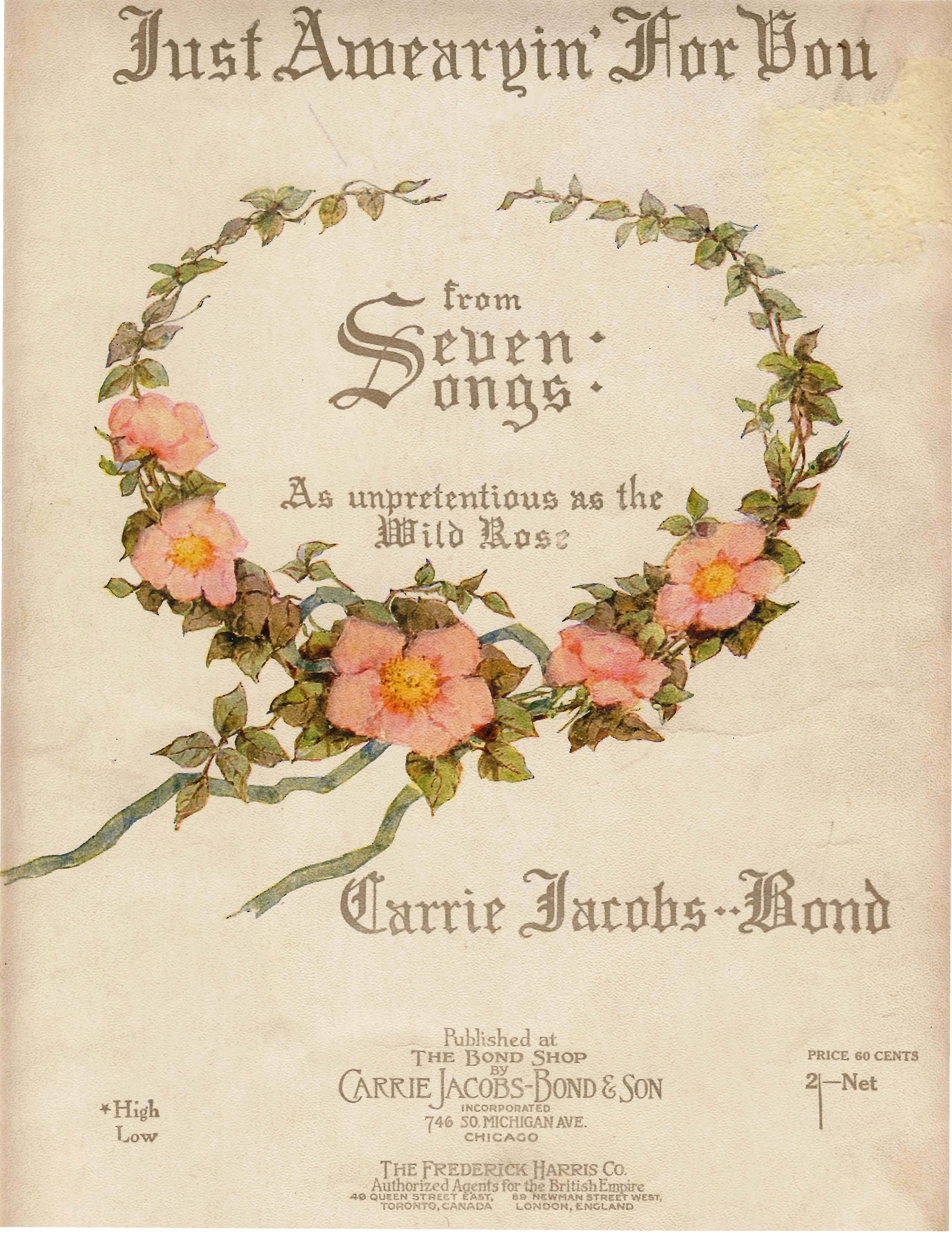
Front cover of "Just Awearyin' for You" (published 1901), a widely selling example of a parlour song.

"Parlour music" was popular music performed in the parlours of middle class homes by amateur singers and pianists. Disseminated as sheet music, its heyday came in the 19th century as a result of a steady increase in the number of households with enough surplus cash to purchase musical instruments and instruction in music and with the leisure time and cultural motivation to engage in recreational music-making. In contrast to the chord-based classical music, parlour music features melodies, which are harmonically independent or not determined by the harmony. Many of the earliest parlour songs were transcriptions for voice and keyboard of other music, such as Thomas Moore's Irish Melodies, which comprised traditional tunes with new lyrics. Other genres performed included arias from Italian operas, patriotic selections, religious songs and pieces written for the musical stage, including excerpts from blackface minstrel shows. As the 19th century wore on, more and more songs were newly composed specifically for use by amateurs at home and these pieces began to develop a style all their own: similar in melodic and harmonic content to art songs of the day, but shorter and simpler in structure and making fewer technical demands on singer and accompanist. The high point of the parlour song came in the late 19th and early 20th centuries in North America and the British Isles. Songs became more complex and sophisticated in their melodic and harmonic vocabulary and, in addition to their continuing use in the parlour, were also often sung in public recitals by professional singers. Characteristic and popular parlour songs include "Home, Sweet Home" by Henry Bishop with lyrics by John Howard Payne, "The Old Arm Chair" by Henry Russell, "The Lost Chord" composed by Arthur Sullivan with lyrics by Adelaide A. Proctor and "Take Back the Heart" by Claribel (Mrs. Charlotte Barnard).

== Music hall ==
Music hall developed as a result of the rapid industrialisation and urbanisation of previously rural populations in the 19th century. The new urban communities, cut off from their cultural roots, required new and accessible means of entertainment. Music halls were originally bars, which provided entertainment in the form of music and speciality acts for their patrons. By the middle years of the 19th century, the first purpose-built music halls were appearing in London. The halls created a demand for new and catchy popular songs that could no longer be met from the traditional folk repertoire. Professional songwriters were enlisted to fill the gap. By the turn of the century, music hall was dominated by song-writing companies and theatre chains, such as that of Sir Oswald Stoll. Music hall songs are characterised by a simple beat and a strong melody or tune, which can be easily acquired by the audience. Typically, a music hall song consists of a series of verses sung by the performer alone and a repeated chorus, which carries the principal melody and in which the audience is encouraged to join. Leading music hall stars included: Marie Lloyd, Harry Champion, George Formby, Vesta Tilley, Gus Elen, Little Tich, Gracie Fields and Flanagan and Allen. Musical hall composers included Lionel Monckton, Felix Powell and Noel Gay.

== Dance bands (big bands) ==
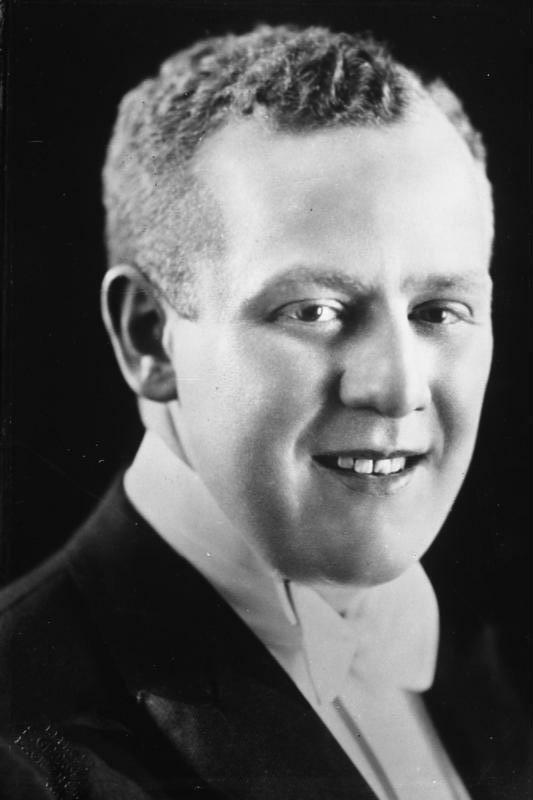
Jack Hylton Dance Band leader and impresario, c. 1930

From about 1925 to 1946 the most popular form of music in the UK was that produced by dance bands. The British bands never quite adopted the kind of "Swing" music that was generally associated American "Big Band" jazz. It was quite tame compared to American jazz and was generally more sweet. Billy Cotton had perhaps the longest fame, as he still had a prime-time TV programme until the late '60s. The fame of Ted Heath lasted until 1964. Fans tended to divide them into "Sweet" (Ambrose, Geraldo and Victor Silvester) and "Hot" (Harry Roy and Nat Gonella). Jack Hylton's band was "hot" until 1933, then became sweeter as their success grew. Some of the lead singers enjoyed fame on their own. Most famous were Al Bowlly and Leslie "Hutch" Hutchinson.

== See also ==
- British pop music
