= A Box of Their Best =

Box set by Electric Light Orchestra
- Released: 7 August 1980
- Recorded: May 1975 – April 1979
- Length: 2:35:52
- Label: Epic
- Producer: Jeff Lynne

Electric Light Orchestra chronology
ELO's Greatest Hits (1979)	A Box of Their Best (1980)	Xanadu (1980)

Professional ratings
Review scores
Source	Rating
AllMusic	3/5 stars
Encyclopedia of Popular Music	3/5 stars

A Box of Their Best is the first US box set by Electric Light Orchestra (ELO), released in 1980. It consisted of the albums A New World Record (with the sides reversed), Out of the Blue and Discovery. Also included was Jeff Lynne's first ever solo single, "Doin' That Crazy Thing". This single, a one-sided single that was marked as a promo, was not in all releases of the box. The box set is almost identical to the UK release Four Light Years, released the same year.

== Track listing ==
All songs written by Jeff Lynne.

7" single

1. "Doin' That Crazy Thing" – 3:21

=== A New World Record ===
Side one
No.	Title	Length
1.	"So Fine"	3:54
2.	"Livin' Thing"	3:31
3.	"Above the Clouds"	2:16
4.	"Do Ya"	3:43
5.	"Shangri-La"	5:32

Side two
No.	Title	Length
6.	"Tightrope"	5:03
7.	"Telephone Line"	4:38
8.	"Rockaria!"	3:12
9.	"Mission (A World Record)"	4:25

=== Out of the Blue ===
Side three
No.	Title	Length
1.	"Turn to Stone"	3:47
2.	"It's Over"	4:08
3.	"Sweet Talkin' Woman"	3:47
4.	"Across the Border"	3:52

Side four
No.	Title	Length
5.	"Night in the City"	4:02
6.	"Starlight"	4:30
7.	"Jungle"	3:51
8.	"Believe Me Now"	1:21
9.	"Steppin' Out"	4:38

Side five – Concerto for a Rainy Day
No.	Title	Length
10.	"Standin' in the Rain"	4:20
11.	"Big Wheels"	5:10
12.	"Summer and Lightning"	4:13
13.	"Mr. Blue Sky"	5:05

Side six
No.	Title	Length
14.	"Sweet is the Night"	3:26
15.	"The Whale"	5:05
16.	"Birmingham Blues"	4:21
17.	"Wild West Hero"	4:40

=== Discovery ===
Side seven
No.	Title	Length
1.	"Shine a Little Love"	4:43
2.	"Confusion"	3:42
3.	"Need Her Love"	5:11
4.	"The Diary of Horace Wimp"	4:17

Side eight
No.	Title	Length
5.	"Last Train to London"	4:32
6.	"Midnight Blue"	4:19
7.	"On the Run"	3:55
8.	"Wishing"	4:13
9.	"Don't Bring Me Down"	4:02
Total length:		155:52

== Personnel ==
- Jeff Lynne – vocals, guitars, piano, synthesizer
- Bev Bevan – drums, percussion
- Richard Tandy – piano, synthesizer, electric piano, clavinet
- Kelly Groucutt – bass guitar, vocals

Additional personnel on sides 1–6

- Mik Kaminski – violin
- Melvyn Gale – cello
- Hugh McDowell – cello
