= Four Light Years =

Box set by Electric Light Orchestra
- Released: 1980
- Recorded: 1976–1979
- Label: Jet
- Producer: Jeff Lynne

Electric Light Orchestra chronology
Xanadu (1980)	Four Light Years (1980)	Time (1981)

Four Light Years is a box set of three studio albums by Electric Light Orchestra (ELO). It was released in 1980 by Jet Records. The box contained three albums: A New World Record (1976), the double album Out of the Blue (1977), and Discovery (1979). Each album was a large commercial success in its own right, but unlike Three Light Years it did not chart as a combined collection on the UK Albums Chart. The set was so-titled because it covered four years, contained four vinyl records, and was a sequel to Three Light Years (1978). A proposed Across the Border EP was meant to promote the box set but was withdrawn. The EP version of the song would later turn up on the 1997 singles compilation Light Years.

== Track listing ==
All songs written by Jeff Lynne.

=== A New World Record ===
Side one

1. "So Fine" – 3:54
2. "Livin' Thing" – 3:31
3. "Above the Clouds" – 2:16
4. "Do Ya" – 3:43
5. "Shangri-La" – 5:32

Side two

1. "Tightrope" – 5:03
2. "Telephone Line" – 4:38
3. "Rockaria!" – 3:12
4. "Mission (A World Record)" – 4:25

=== Out of the Blue ===
Side three

1. "Turn to Stone" – 3:47
2. "It's Over" – 4:08
3. "Sweet Talkin' Woman" – 3:47
4. "Across the Border" – 3:52

Side four

5. "Night in the City" – 4:02
6. "Starlight" – 4:30
7. "Jungle" – 3:51
8. "Believe Me Now" – 1:21
9. "Steppin' Out" – 4:38

Side five – Concerto for a Rainy Day

10. "Standin' in the Rain" – 4:20
11. "Big Wheels" – 5:10
12. "Summer and Lightning" – 4:13
13. "Mr. Blue Sky" – 5:05

Side six

14. "Sweet Is the Night" – 3:26
15. "The Whale" – 5:05
16. "Birmingham Blues" – 4:21
17. "Wild West Hero" – 4:40

=== Discovery ===
Side seven

1. "Shine a Little Love" – 4:43
2. "Confusion" – 3:42
3. "Need Her Love" – 5:11
4. "The Diary of Horace Wimp" – 4:17

Side eight

5. "Last Train to London" – 4:32
6. "Midnight Blue" – 4:19
7. "On the Run" – 3:55
8. "Wishing" – 4:13
9. "Don't Bring Me Down" – 4:02
