= Lynne Me Your Ears =

Lynne Me Your Ears – A Tribute to the Music of Jeff Lynne

Compilation album by Various artists
- Released: 27 November 2001
- Genre: Rock
- Label: Vivid Sound
- Producer: Doug Powell

Professional ratings
Review scores
| Source | Rating |
|---|---|
| AllMusic | 4.5/5 stars |

Lynne Me Your Ears – A Tribute to the Music of Jeff Lynne is a compilation of compositions written by songwriter Jeff Lynne. Most tracks on the album are cover versions of Lynne's longest-running and most successful group, Electric Light Orchestra, although there are also cover versions of work that Lynne has done with Traveling Wilburys, The Move and The Idle Race.

== Track listing ==
=== Disc 1 ===
1. "10538 Overture" – Bobby Sutliff & Mitch Easter (4:35)
2. "Ma Ma Ma Belle" – Earl Slick (4:05)
3. "Telephone Line" – Jeffrey Foskett (4:49)
4. "Do Ya" – Jason Falkner (3:58)
5. "Sweet Is the Night" – Ben Lee (3:28)
6. "Rockaria!" – Pat Buchanan (3:49)
7. "Every Little Thing" – Michael Carpenter (3:52)
8. "No Time" – Peter Holsapple (3:59)
9. "Showdown" – Richard Barone (4:26)
10. "Handle with Care" – Jamie Hoover (3:25)
11. "Strange Magic" – Mark Helm (3:54)
12. "Evil Woman" – Ross Rice (4:51)
13. "Steppin' Out" – Carl Wayne (4:27)
14. "Don't Bring Me Down" – Swag (3:13)
15. "One Summer Dream" – Prairie Sons And Daughters (feat. Prairie Prince) (7:16)
16. "Can't Get It Out of My Head" – Doug Powell (4:57)

=== Disc 2 ===
1. "Twilight" – The Shazam (3:11)
2. "Mr. Blue Sky" – Tony Visconti (with Kristeen Young and Richard Barone) (5:02)
3. "You Took My Breath Away" – The Heavy Blinkers (3:07)
4. "Message from the Country" – The Balls of France (4:28)
5. "The Minister" – Ferenzik (4:43)
6. "Xanadu" – Neilson Hubbard And Venus Hum (3:31)
7. "When Time Stood Still" – Bill Lloyd (3:27)
8. "Above the Clouds" – Sparkle Jets UK (4:00)
9. "Rock And Roll Is King" – Walter Clevenger & The Dairy Kings (3:14)
10. "Morning Sunshine" – Jeremy (2:19)
11. "Boy Blue" – Rick Altizer (3:45)
12. "Livin' Thing" – PFR (3:57)
13. "On the Run" – Sixpence None the Richer (2:37)
14. "Bluebird Is Dead" – Todd Rundgren (5:06)
15. "Turn to Stone" – Roger Klug (5:11)
16. "Eldorado" – Fleming and John (6:41)
