= Electric Light Orchestra Live =

Live album by Electric Light Orchestra
- Released: 19 April 2013
- Recorded: 2001, at CBS Television City in Los Angeles
- Genre: Rock
- Length: 50:24
- Label: Frontiers
- Producer: Jeff Lynne

Electric Light Orchestra chronology
Mr. Blue Sky: The Very Best of Electric Light Orchestra (2012)	Electric Light Orchestra Live (2013)	Alone in the Universe (2015)

Professional ratings
Review scores
Source	Rating
AllMusic	3.5/5 stars
Goldmine	4/5 stars

Electric Light Orchestra Live is a live album by Electric Light Orchestra. It was released on 19 April 2013 in the UK, and on 23 April in the US on Frontiers Records.

== Overview ==
The album consists of performances from their 2001 Zoom Tour Live PBS taping at CBS Television City in Los Angeles, along with two previously unreleased studio tracks. While all the songs on this CD were making their official audio debut, "Secret Messages", "Sweet Talkin' Woman", "Twilight" and "Confusion" were especially unique as they did not even appear on the Zoom Tour Live DVD.

Two additional live tracks from the same performances, "Turn to Stone" and "Do Ya", were released as bonus tracks on various editions of their Zoom album reissue, which coincided with the release of Electric Light Orchestra Live, while "Twilight" has been previously released as a Japanese bonus track on Mr. Blue Sky: The Very Best of Electric Light Orchestra.

== Track listing ==
All tracks are written by Jeff Lynne, with the exception of "Roll Over Beethoven" by Chuck Berry.

No.	Title	Length
1.	"Evil Woman"	4:28
2.	"Showdown"	4:09
3.	"Secret Messages"	4:06
4.	"Livin' Thing"	4:10
5.	"Sweet Talkin' Woman"	3:16
6.	"Mr. Blue Sky"	3:32
7.	"Can't Get It Out of My Head"	4:12
8.	"Twilight"	3:31
9.	"Confusion"	3:35
10.	"Don't Bring Me Down"	4:08
11.	"Roll Over Beethoven"	6:26

=== Bonus tracks ===
No.	Title	Length
12.	"Out of Luck" (Recorded 2010; previously unreleased)	2:36
13.	"Cold Feet" (Recorded 1992; previously unreleased)	2:18
Total length:		50:24

=== Additional Japanese bonus track ===
No.	Title	Length
14.	"Telephone Line" (Live from Bungalow Palace)	4:07

== Personnel ==
- Jeff Lynne – lead vocals, lead guitar, rhythm guitar
- Richard Tandy – keyboards, synthesizer, vocoder
- Marc Mann – lead guitar, rhythm guitar, keyboards, backing vocals
- Matt Bissonette – bass guitar, backing vocals
- Gregg Bissonette – drums, backing vocals
- Peggy Baldwin – electric cello
- Sarah O'Brien – electric cello
- Rosie Vela – backing vocals
