= Zoom Tour Live =

Live album by Electric Light Orchestra

- DVD Cover

Video by Electric Light Orchestra
- Released: November 13, 2001
- Recorded: May 23 & 24, 2001
- Genre: Rock
- Label: Image Entertainment

Electric Light Orchestra chronology
The Very Best of ELO (1991)	Zoom Tour Live (2001)	ELO – Total Rock Review (2006)

Zoom Tour Live was a one-off concert performed by the Electric Light Orchestra recorded originally for television, later released as a video.

== History ==
In order to promote the new upcoming Electric Light Orchestra album Zoom a promotional PBS show was recorded over two consecutive nights, May 23 & 24, 2001 at CBS Television City in Los Angeles. Jeff Lynne and Richard Tandy were the only band members returning from the original incarnation of ELO. Zoom was released two weeks later, on 12 June 2001.

After the release of the 2001 album Zoom, Jeff Lynne announced a North American tour, their first live set of concerts in 15 years. However, ELO's management abruptly cancelled the tour (initially due to slow ticket sales, and then because of travel complications worldwide following the September 11 attacks).

The footage recorded at CBS Television City was released on VHS and DVD by Image Entertainment. The DVD earned Platinum status in Australia and the UK.

In 2013 a live album, Electric Light Orchestra Live, based on the same performances was released. It also featured songs not available on the video version.

== Lineup ==
- Jeff Lynne – vocals, lead guitar
- Richard Tandy – keyboards, synthesizer, vocoder
- Marc Mann – rhythm guitar, keyboards, backing vocals
- Matt Bissonette – bass guitar, backing vocals
- Gregg Bissonette – drums, backing vocals
- Peggy Baldwin – electric cello
- Sarah O'Brien – electric cello
- Rosie Vela – backing vocals

== Tracklisting ==
All songs are written by Jeff Lynne except "Roll Over Beethoven" written by Chuck Berry

1. "Do Ya"
2. "Evil Woman"
3. "Showdown"
4. "Strange Magic"
5. "Livin' Thing"
6. "Alright"
7. "Lonesome Lullaby"
8. "Telephone Line"
9. "Turn to Stone"
10. "Just for Love"
11. "Easy Money"
12. "Mr. Blue Sky"
13. "Ma-Ma-Ma Belle"
14. "One Summer Dream"
15. "Tightrope"
16. "State of Mind"
17. "Can't Get It Out of My Head"
18. "Moment in Paradise"
19. "10538 Overture"
20. "Ordinary Dream"
21. "Shine a Little Love"
22. "Don't Bring Me Down"
23. "Roll Over Beethoven"

== Certifications ==
Region	Certification	Certified units/sales
Australia (ARIA)	2× Platinum	30,000^{^}
United Kingdom (BPI)	Platinum	50,000^{*}
^{*} Sales figures based on certification alone.^{^} Shipments figures based on certification alone.
