= Mr. Blue Sky: The Very Best of Electric Light Orchestra =

Studio album by Jeff Lynne
- Released: 8 October 2012
- Studio: Bungalow Palace
- Genre: Rock
- Length: 48:51
- Label: Frontiers
- Producer: Jeff Lynne

Jeff Lynne chronology
The Essential Electric Light Orchestra (2 CD Edition) (2011)	Mr. Blue Sky: The Very Best of Electric Light Orchestra (2012)	Electric Light Orchestra Live (2013)

Mr. Blue Sky: The Very Best of Electric Light Orchestra, also known as Mr. Blue Sky, is an album of re-recordings by Jeff Lynne of hits by Electric Light Orchestra. It was issued in 2012 by Frontiers Music simultaneously with Lynne's cover album Long Wave.

== Background ==
Jeff Lynne told Rolling Stone magazine that the idea came from him listening to the original Electric Light Orchestra recordings, and thinking that he could produce a better result having since had a long career as a record producer. Lynne decided to re-record a number of songs from scratch, and began with "Mr. Blue Sky". "I enjoyed doing that a lot, and when I listened back to it and compared it to the old one, I really liked it much better." Lynne's manager suggested Lynne record a few more versions of ELO songs, the results being recordings of "Evil Woman" and "Strange Magic". Lynne also liked these versions, so he continued by producing a full album of re-recordings.

== Release and content ==
The album features all new recordings of some of the group's hits, as well as two bonus tracks: a new song, "Point of No Return", and a live recording of "Twilight" on Japanese releases. The album debuted at number 8 on the UK Albums Chart and at number 2 on the UK Top 40 Independent Albums Chart, then also at number 118 on the US Billboard 200 albums chart, at number 29 on the Billboard Top Independent Albums chart and at number 46 on the Billboard Top Rock Albums chart.

== Track listing ==
All tracks written, produced, and performed by Jeff Lynne.

No.	Title	Length
1.	"Mr. Blue Sky"	3:44
2.	"Evil Woman"	4:30
3.	"Strange Magic"	3:53
4.	"Don't Bring Me Down"	4:01
5.	"Turn to Stone"	3:46
6.	"Showdown"	4:16
7.	"Telephone Line"	4:30
8.	"Livin' Thing"	3:42
9.	"Do Ya"	3:56
10.	"Can't Get It Out of My Head"	4:35
11.	"10538 Overture" (40th anniversary version)	4:44
12.	"Point of No Return" (Previously unreleased)	3:14
Total length:		48:51

=== Japanese bonus track ===
No.	Title	Length
13.	"Twilight" (Live from CBS Television City, 2001)	3:40

=== iTunes Store "Deluxe edition" bonus tracks ===
No.	Title	Length
14.	"Ma-Ma-Ma Belle"	3:52
15.	"Rockaria!"	3:13
16.	"Steppin' Out" (Live from Bungalow Palace)	3:23
17.	"Can't Get It Out of My Head" (Live from Bungalow Palace)	4:11

== Personnel ==
- Jeff Lynne – lead vocals, background vocals, lead guitar, rhythm guitar, piano, bass, drums, keyboards, vocoder, cowbell, production, mixing, engineering
- Marc Mann – string arrangements, Minimoog ("Turn to Stone"), engineering
- Laura Lynne – background vocals ("Evil Woman", "Strange Magic", "Showdown", "Livin' Thing")
- Steve Jay – shakers, tambourine, mixing, engineering
- Ryan Ulyate – piano solo ("Evil Woman"), engineering
- Howie Weinberg – mastering engineer
- Dan Gerbarg – mastering engineer

== Charts ==
Chart (2012)	Peak position
Belgian Albums (Ultratop Flanders)	119
Belgian Albums (Ultratop Wallonia)	129
Dutch Albums (Album Top 100)	78
UK Albums (OCC)	8
UK Independent Albums (OCC)	29
US Billboard 200	118
US Independent Albums (Billboard)	29
US Top Rock Albums (Billboard)	46

== Certifications ==
Region	Certification	Certified units/sales
United Kingdom (BPI)	Gold	100,000^{‡}
^{‡} Sales+streaming figures based on certification alone.
