= Doin' That Crazy Thing =

Single by Jeff Lynne
- B-side: "Goin' Down to Rio"
- Released: 1977
- Recorded: 1977
- Genre: Pop rock, disco, funk rock
- Length: 3:25
- Label: United Artists
- Songwriter: Jeff Lynne
- Producer: Jeff Lynne

Jeff Lynne singles chronology
"Doin' That Crazy Thing" (1977)	"Video!" (1984)

"Doin' That Crazy Thing" is a song written, recorded and produced by Jeff Lynne.

The song and its associated dance started in the mind of Lynne when he took a short break from being Electric Light Orchestra's frontman. He released the single "Doin' That Crazy Thing", backed with "Goin' Down to Rio", in the summer of 1977.

It was released with two covers: one with a photo of Lynne's face with various seemingly unrelated pictures on the side in black and white (including a man riding an emu and another riding a bicycle backwards), and one colored with an instruction how to do the "Crazy Thing". A one-sided 7" single of the song was included in ELO's 1980 box set A Box of Their Best as a promo, despite not being related to the band other than through Jeff Lynne.

It was the first time Lynne's name appeared as principal, and not the name of a band. Although ELO was enjoying major success in the singles and albums charts at the time, it received very little airplay, no TV exposure, and did not chart.

Cash Box said that "using catch phrases from disco and other jive for lyrics, Lynne has tamed a riot of different sounds into a cohesive record that defies categorization."

== Track listing ==
The songs are composed by Jeff Lynne.

1. "Doin' That Crazy Thing" - 3:25
2. "Goin' Down to Rio" - 3:45
