= Mary Thomas (soprano) =

Welsh soprano (1932–1997)

Averil Mary Thomas (2 August 1932 – 17 April 1997) was a Welsh soprano.

== Career ==
After studying at the Royal Academy of Music, she established herself in the 1960s as a successful early music performer. She appeared as a soloist as well as a member of the Deller Consort. She was also notable for her work in contemporary music. Peter Maxwell Davies wrote pieces with her voice and dramatic ability in mind.

=== Notable performances ===
She gave the first performances of a number of works by Peter Maxwell Davies, accompanied by the Fires of London.

- Revelation and Fall (premiered February 1968, adapted 1980).
- Missa super l'homme armé (premiered February 1968, revised 1971).

She appeared at the Proms between 1962 and 1983, singing music ranging from Baroque to Maxwell Davies.

== Selected recordings ==
- Thomas's vocals appeared on the 1976 ELO tracks "Rockaria!" and "Shangri-La" from the album A New World Record; "Rockaria!", released as a single in 1977, reached the Top Ten on the UK Singles Chart.
- Revelation and Fall (reissued on CD in 2004)
