= Goin' Down to Rio =

Single by Jeff Lynne
- A-side: "Doin' That Crazy Thing"
- Released: 1977
- Recorded: 1977
- Genre: Pop rock
- Length: 3:45
- Label: United Artists
- Songwriter(s): Jeff Lynne
- Producer(s): Jeff Lynne

Jeff Lynne singles chronology
"Goin' Down to Rio"	"Video!"

US alternate album cover

"Goin' Down to Rio" is a song by Jeff Lynne, B-side to "Doin' That Crazy Thing".

== Track listing ==
The songs are written by Jeff Lynne.

1. "Doin' That Crazy Thing" - 3:25
2. "Goin' Down to Rio" - 3:45
