= Xanadu (soundtrack) =

Soundtrack album by Olivia Newton-John and Electric Light Orchestra
- Released: June 27, 1980
- Studios: Musicland (Munich, West Germany); David J. Holman (Los Angeles, California)
- Genres: Pop rock; disco; soft rock
- Length: 41:34
- Labels: MCA (US & Canada); Jet (international)
- Producers: John Farrar; Jeff Lynne

Olivia Newton-John chronology
Totally Hot (1978)	Xanadu (1980)	Love Performance (1981)

Electric Light Orchestra chronology
A Box of Their Best (1980)	Xanadu (1980)	Four Light Years (1980)

Singles from Xanadu
- 1. "Magic" Released: May 1980; 2. "I'm Alive" Released: May 1980; 3. "Xanadu" Released: June 1980; 4. "All Over the World" Released: July 1980; 5. "Suddenly" Released: October 1980; 6. "Don't Walk Away" Released: November 1980

Professional ratings
Review scores
Source	Rating
AllMusic	3.5/5 stars
Encyclopedia of Popular Music	2/5 stars
MusicHound	1.5/5
Smash Hits	6/10

Xanadu is the soundtrack to the 1980 musical film of the same name, featuring the Australian singer Olivia Newton-John and the British group Electric Light Orchestra (ELO). It was released in June 1980 on MCA Records in the United States and July 1980 by Jet Records in the United Kingdom. The original LP release featured on side one the songs of Newton-John, and on side two the songs of ELO. In 2008 the soundtrack album was digitally remastered as a bonus CD as part of the film's DVD release titled Xanadu: Magical Musical Edition.

Although the film was a critical and commercial disappointment, the soundtrack was a worldwide success and received positive reviews from music critics, earning double platinum certifications in the United States and Canada. The singles "Magic" and "Xanadu" reached number one in the United States and United Kingdom, respectively. "Magic" became Olivia's ninth Number One single in The Netherlands, while "Xanadu" topped the chart in Italy. All in all, the album was the fifth most popular US soundtrack of 1981.

== Background ==
The soundtrack featured songs on side one by the film's star, Olivia Newton-John, written by her long-time producer, John Farrar. The songs on side two were written and performed by ELO; the title track which closed side two featured Newton-John as lead vocalist.

The Newton-John side also featured Cliff Richard, the Tubes and Gene Kelly.

At the time of the album's release, Olivia Newton-John was signed to MCA Records, while ELO were signed to Jet Records. A compromise was worked out between the two companies in that the album was released on MCA in the US and Canada, and on Jet in the rest of the world. Not every song from the soundtrack was included on the album, with the Newton-John solo, "You Made Me Love You" released only on the B-side of the duet "Suddenly", "Fool Country" released as the b-side of "Magic", and ELO's "Drum Dreams" released on the b-side of both "I'm Alive" and "All Over The World".

== Reception ==
In their review, Billboard praised the album:

Newton-John's first soundtrack since the multi-platinum Grease has her romping through a variety of cuts, ranging from the bewitching ballad "Magic" to the rock-inflected title cut, written by Jeff Lynne. Newton-John duets on three of her numbers - ballads with her costar Gene Kelly and onetime mentor Cliff Richard and a hot rock number with the Tubes. The other side of the soundtrack is dominated by four ELO tracks, including the hot single "I'm Alive." Since Newton -John and ELO are both coming off top 10 albums -"Totally Hot" and "Discovery" - it's hard to see how this single-disk package can miss.

Cashbox stated:

While ELO and Olivia Newton-John supply most of the musical fireworks on this beautifully produced LP, winning performances are also turned in by The Tubes, Cliff Richard and artist/producer John Farrar. ELO's rock dancer "I'm Alive" is already headed toward the Top Ten, and John's "Magic" should follow suit. The album and the film should cross promote each other beautifully.

AllMusic noted:

This soundtrack is fluff stuff to be sure, but some pearls float amongst the mire. Lead-off "Magic" remains a fine single. "Suddenly," a duet ONJ ekes out with British luminary Cliff Richard, seems better than most love themes. The sudden appearance of the Tubes almost saves the doomed swing/rock hybrid "Dancin," but the two styles should never meet. The second half glows from the Electric Light Orchestra, soaring at its commercial height, escaping this crippling fairy tale fairly untarnished with three more hit bits: "I'm Alive," "All Over the World," and the Olivia Neutron Bomb showcase title track. "Don't Walk Away" and "The Fall" stand as two of Jeff Lynne's finest, thus the flip nukes the front which should stay stuck to the theater floor. Listening to this soundtrack may beat watching the actual film, but know that if you didn't dig Xanadu when it came out, the platter gains nothing through time.

== Track listing ==
All tracks on Side One written by John Farrar.

Side One
No.	Title	Performer	Length
1.	"Magic"	Olivia Newton-John	4:31
2.	"Suddenly"	Olivia Newton-John with Cliff Richard	4:02
3.	"Dancin'"	Olivia Newton-John with the Tubes	5:17
4.	"Suspended in Time"	Olivia Newton-John	3:55
5.	"Whenever You're Away from Me"	Olivia Newton-John with Gene Kelly	4:22

All tracks on Side Two written by Jeff Lynne.

Side Two
No.	Title	Performer(s)	Length
6.	"I'm Alive"	Electric Light Orchestra	3:46
7.	"The Fall"	Electric Light Orchestra	3:34
8.	"Don't Walk Away"	Electric Light Orchestra	4:48
9.	"All Over the World"	Electric Light Orchestra	4:04
10.	"Xanadu"	Olivia Newton-John and Electric Light Orchestra	3:28
Total length:			41:34

== Personnel ==
=== Side One: Olivia Newton-John ===
- Olivia Newton-John – lead vocals, backing vocals
- John Farrar – electric guitars, synthesizers, backing vocals
- David Hungate – bass guitar on "Magic" and "Suspended in Time"
- David McDaniel – bass guitar on "Suddenly"
- Ed Greene – drums, percussion (except on "Magic")
- Carlos Vega – drums, percussion on "Magic"
- Jai Winding – electric piano on "Suddenly"
- Michael Boddicker – vocoder on "Suddenly"

Additional personnel

- Cliff Richard – co-lead vocals on "Suddenly"
- Fee Waybill – co-lead vocals on "Dancin'"
- Roger Steen – guitars on "Dancin'"
- Bill Spooner – guitars on "Dancin'"
- Michael Cotten – synthesizer on "Dancin'"
- Gene Kelly – co-lead vocals on "Whenever You're Away from Me"
- Lou Halmy – whistling on "Whenever You're Away from Me"
- Strings arranged and conducted by Richard Hewson
- David J. Holman – engineer and mixer
- Recorded and mixed at David J. Holman Studio in Laurel Canyon

=== Side Two: Electric Light Orchestra ===
- Jeff Lynne – lead vocals (except on "Xanadu"), backing vocals, electric guitars, acoustic guitars, keyboards, synthesizers
- Bev Bevan – drums, percussion, tympani
- Richard Tandy – pianos, synthesizers, keyboards
- Kelly Groucutt – bass guitar, backing vocals

Additional personnel

- Olivia Newton-John – lead vocals on "Xanadu"
- James Newton Howard – synthesizers on "Xanadu"
- Strings by Louis Clark
- Mack – engineer

== Charts ==
=== Weekly charts ===
Weekly chart performance for Xanadu
Chart (1980)	Peak position
Australian Albums (Kent Music Report)	1
Austrian Albums (Ö3 Austria)	1
Belgian Albums (Billboard Benelux)	1
Canada Top Albums/CDs (RPM)	2
Dutch Albums (Album Top 100)	1
Finnish Albums (Suomen virallinen lista)	6
German Albums (Offizielle Top 100)	1
Israeli Albums (IBA)	1
Italian Albums (Musica e dischi)	10
Japanese LP Chart (Oricon)	6
New Zealand Albums (RMNZ)	8
Norwegian Albums (VG-lista)	1
Spanish Albums (AFYVE)	1
Swedish Albums (Sverigetopplistan)	1
UK Albums (Official Charts)	2
US Billboard 200	4
US Albums (Record World)	1
US Top 100 Albums (Cash Box)	1

=== Year-end charts ===
1980 year-end chart performance for Xanadu
Chart (1980)	Position
Australian Albums (Kent Music Report)	12
Austrian Albums (Ö3 Austria)	6
Canada Top Albums/CDs (RPM)	21
Dutch Albums (Album Top 100)	23
French Albums Chart	84
German Albums (Offizielle Top 100)	21
New Zealand Albums (RMNZ)	45
UK Albums (OCC)	53
US Soundtrack Albums (Billboard)	11

1981 year-end chart performance for Xanadu
Chart (1981)	Position
US Soundtrack Albums (Billboard)	5

== Certifications and sales ==
Certifications and sales for Xanadu
Region	Certification	Certified units/sales
Australia (ARIA)	Platinum	50,000^{^}
Canada (Music Canada)	2× Platinum	200,000^{^}
France	—	100,000
Germany (BVMI)	Gold	250,000^{^}
Hong Kong (IFPI Hong Kong)	Platinum	20,000^{*}
Italy	—	100,000
Japan	—	312,150
New Zealand (RMNZ)	Platinum	15,000^{^}
United Kingdom (BPI)	Gold	100,000^{^}
United States (RIAA)	2× Platinum	2,000,000^{^}
Summaries
Worldwide	—	5,000,000
^{*} Sales figures based on certification alone.^{^} Shipments figures based on certification alone.
