= Video! =

Single by Jeff Lynne

from the album Electric Dreams
- B-side: "Sooner or Later"
- Released: 1984
- Recorded: 1984
- Genre: Pop rock
- Length: 3:26
- Label: Virgin/Epic
- Songwriter: Jeff Lynne
- Producer: Jeff Lynne

Jeff Lynne singles chronology
"Doin' That Crazy Thing" (1977)	"Video!" (1984)	"Every Little Thing" (1990)

"Video!" is a song by Jeff Lynne from the soundtrack to the film Electric Dreams in 1984. It is one of two songs that Lynne and keyboard player Richard Tandy provided for the film's soundtrack. The single version is 3:26 in length, while the version included in the film is longer, at 4:18.

The chorus of "Video!" is originally taken from the unreleased Electric Light Orchestra song "Beatles Forever", which was originally to have appeared on the album, Secret Messages, when it was planned to be a double album.

== Reception ==
Muriel Gray at Smash Hits said, "Mr. Lynne likes to catch on to buzzwords and then attempt to build a song around them. 'Video madness comes upon us' we are informed and, to back up this earth-shattering statement, we are treated to some Buggles-like voices. A nasty piece of work if ever there was."

== Track listing ==
All songs written and composed by Jeff Lynne.

1. "Video!" – 3:26
2. "Sooner or Later" – 3:51

== Charts ==
Chart (1984)	Peak position
US Billboard Hot 100	85
