= So Fine (Electric Light Orchestra song) =

Song by Electric Light Orchestra

from the album A New World Record
- Released: 1976
- Recorded: 1976
- Genre: Rock, art rock, funk rock
- Length: 3:54
- Label: Jet Records, United Artists
- Songwriter: Jeff Lynne
- Producer: Jeff Lynne

A New World Record track listing
- 9 tracks Side one: 1. "Tightrope"; 2. "Telephone Line"; 3. "Rockaria!"; 4. "Mission (A World Record)"; Side two: 5. "So Fine"; 6. "Livin' Thing"; 7. "Above the Clouds"; 8. "Do Ya"; 9. "Shangri-La"

"So Fine" is the title of the fifth track from A New World Record by Electric Light Orchestra.

Recorded in 1976 at Musicland Studios in Munich, Germany, this track is peppy and upbeat, contrasting with "Mission (A World Record)", the previous track. It is a typical example of ELO's (at the time) cutting-edge use of technology and recording techniques, which would become the conventional sound of pop music within 10 years.

The middle section contains drums and electronic percussion created by a then state of the art Moog processor, and continues with rising intensity. More and more instruments join in, until the vocal again takes over. As the song fades out, it segues into the violin of "Livin' Thing".

== Production and composition ==
"So Fine" has a vibe similar to the pre-1975 Doobie Brothers and songs such as "Listen to the Music" and "Long Train Runnin'", but more suitable for dancing. The music incorporates violins and "funky" rhythm guitar to a disco beat. The dance elements exhibit elements of the Bee Gees and of Philadelphia soul. In the middle of the song, the stops before each instrument returns one by one, starting with Bev Bevan's minimoog drums and then Kelly Groucutt's bass guitar.

According to ELO drummer Bev Bevan (regarding the Moog processor):

Uh, yeah, I used it on one track on the album, "So Fine". It really - It's quite a new item, really. It's made by the Moog people. It's an electronic - It's a drum itself and it's electronic. You plug it through the keyboard setup into the Moog itself. And according to what setting you put on the Moog, you can get a sound accordingly on the drum. And, uh, it's very new. Very innovative." Bev Bevan (1976 - Rock Around The World radio show interview)

Composer Jeff Lynne described writing the song in a 1990 radio interview with Roger Scott:

"So Fine's a bouncy little (number). I really don't know much about it. It's just that I wrote it and sang the thing. And um- I suppose it was along the lines of a - like an American, trying to sound like an American style. Maybe like The Doobie Brothers or something, y'know, trying to sound a bit like an American group with harmonies. I wasn't trying to copy 'em, but it was... it was sort of bouncy American style with a wobbly bit on the top." Jeff Lynne (August 21, 1990 - Classic Albums radio interview by Roger Scott)

Regarding the dropping end of "So Fine" to segue into the next song on the LP, "Livin' Thing":

"(It) was getting the two track and - and just basically switching it off, y'know, the motors off. So that it went '(SQUEAL)' and when it got to the - to the key that, uh, Livin' Thing was in, we cut it there and just but it straight on. So as it reached C, what Livin' Thing was in. So it went down from like - maybe F sharp all the way down to C, y'know, the tape went. Somewhere like that. I can't remember the exact keys. I know it was quite a long drop." Jeff Lynne (August 21, 1990 - Classic Albums radio interview by Roger Scott)

In the book about ELO, Unexpected Messages, the authors expounded "The end of the song So Fine fades into "Livin' Thing". This was created by unplugging the tape machine and when it got to the key 'A' (which starts off Livin' Thing) Jeff cut it."

== Reception ==
ELO buigrapher Barry Delve called "So Fine" a "bounding ball of effervescence that's impossible not to like." Roanoke Times critic Fran Coombs described it as "a medium-range rocker in the 'Evil Woman' tradition." Santa Barbara News-Press critic Bill Milton called it a "sure-fire hit" that has "an uncluttered fat sound with strong dance [beat] and futuristic riffs melded in." Hartford Courant critic Henry McNulty criticized the "little electronic burps that serve as a break" in the song but felt it was still "a piece of good British rock." Allmusic critic Bruce Eder said that it "seems like the perfect pop synthesis of guitar, percussion, and orchestral sounds, embodying precisely what Lynne had first set out to do with Roy Wood at the moment ELO was conceived."
