= Zoom (Electric Light Orchestra album) =

Studio album by Electric Light Orchestra
- Released: 12 June 2001
- Recorded: 2000–2001
- Genres: Rock, symphonic rock
- Length: 43:36
- Label: Epic
- Producer: Jeff Lynne

Electric Light Orchestra chronology
The Ultimate Collection (2001)	Zoom (2001)	The Electric Light Orchestra (First Light Series) (2001)

Singles from Zoom
- 1. "Alright" Released: 23 May 2001 (Europe only; except UK); 2. "Moment in Paradise" Released: 3 September 2001 (Europe only; except UK)

Zoom is the twelfth studio album by British symphonic rock band Electric Light Orchestra (ELO), released on 12 June 2001 on Epic Records. It was the first official ELO album since 1986's Balance of Power.

== Recording ==
Zoom was recorded primarily by Jeff Lynne alone, with guest musicians including George Harrison and Ringo Starr. Zoom is the first ELO album not to feature original drummer Bev Bevan and was one of Harrison's last recordings before his death. The only other ELO member appearing on the album, Richard Tandy, appears on the opening track and performed live in promotional concerts.

== Release and reception ==
Professional ratings
Review scores
Source	Rating
AllMusic	3.5/5 stars
Encyclopedia of Popular Music	3/5 stars
Goldmine	4/5 stars
Q	2/5 stars
Rolling Stone	3/5 stars
The Rolling Stone Album Guide	3/5 stars

The album was the band's first release of new material since Balance of Power, released in 1986. Although billed as a return to the classic ELO sound, the album sales were relatively poor and a planned North American concert tour was cancelled. Upon release, the album charted at number 34 in the UK Albums Chart. In the US, it debuted at number 94 on the Billboard 200 and number 14 on the Billboard Top Internet Albums chart, with around 18,000 copies sold in the United States. As of October 2015, the album had sold 87,000 copies in the US.

The album peaked at number 51 on Austria's Ö3 Austria Top 40 Longplay chart, and number 16 on Germany's Media Control Album Chart. The single from the album "Alright" peaked at number 87 on the Dutch Top 40 chart in the Netherlands.

A remaster by Frontiers was released on 19 April 2013 in the UK, and on 23 April 2013 in the US, and included four previously unreleased bonus tracks, two of them live recordings from the 2001 Zoom Tour Live PBS taping at CBS Television City in Los Angeles. The remaster of the Japan-only track, "Long Black Road" (which does not appear on the Frontiers release), was included along with "10538 Overture" in the soundtrack for the 2013 film American Hustle.

== Track listing ==
All tracks are written by Jeff Lynne.

Original Release
No.	Title	Length
1.	"Alright"	3:13
2.	"Moment in Paradise"	3:36
3.	"State of Mind"	3:04
4.	"Just for Love"	3:40
5.	"Stranger on a Quiet Street"	3:41
6.	"In My Own Time"	3:03
7.	"Easy Money"	2:50
8.	"It Really Doesn't Matter"	3:20
9.	"Ordinary Dream"	3:23
10.	"A Long Time Gone"	3:15
11.	"Melting in the Sun"	3:10
12.	"All She Wanted"	3:14
13.	"Lonesome Lullaby"	4:02

Original Release Japanese Bonus Track
No.	Title	Length
14.	"Long Black Road"	3:22

2013 Remaster Bonus Tracks
No.	Title	Length
14.	"One Day" (Recorded 2004; previously unreleased)	3:04
15.	"Turn to Stone" (Live from CBS Television City, 2001; previously unreleased as audio)	3:40

2013 Japanese Remaster Bonus Tracks
No.	Title	Length
14.	"One Day" (Recorded 2004; previously unreleased)	3:04
15.	"Do Ya" (Live from CBS Television City, 2001; previously unreleased as audio)	3:48
16.	"Lucky Motel" (Previously unreleased)	2:11

== Personnel ==
- Jeff Lynne – Vocals, electric guitars, bass, keyboards, cello ("Melting in the Sun"), drums

Guest musicians

- Richard Tandy – Keyboards ("Alright")
- George Harrison – Slide guitar ("A Long Time Gone" and "All She Wanted")
- Ringo Starr – Drums ("Moment in Paradise" and "Easy Money")
- Marc Mann – Rhythm guitar ("Moment in Paradise"), string arrangements ("In My Own Time" and "Melting in the Sun")
- Suzie Katayama – Cello ("Just for Love", "Stranger on a Quiet Street" and "All She Wanted")
- Roger Lebow – Cello ("Lonesome Lullaby")
- Dave Boruff – Saxophone ("A Long Time Gone")
- Laura Lynne – Backing vocals ("All She Wanted")
- Rosie Vela – Backing vocals ("Alright", "All She Wanted"), spoken parts and tap dancing ("In My Own Time")
- Kris Wilkinson – String arrangements ("Ordinary Dream")

== Charts ==
Chart (2001)	Peak position
Austrian Albums (Ö3 Austria)	51
Belgian Albums (Ultratop Wallonia)	37
Dutch Albums (Album Top 100)	46
German Albums (Offizielle Top 100)	16
Japanese Albums (Oricon)	36
Norwegian Albums (VG-lista)	18
Russian International Albums (InterMedia)	1
Scottish Albums (Official Charts)	37
Swedish Albums (Sverigetopplistan)	35
Swiss Albums (Schweizer Hitparade)	26
UK Albums (Official Charts)	34
US Billboard 200	94
US Top Internet Albums (Billboard)	14

Chart (2001)	Peak position
UK Independent Albums (Official Charts)	37

== Certifications ==
Region	Certification	Certified units/sales
Australia (ARIA)	Platinum	70,000^{^}
^{^} Shipments figures based on certification alone.
