= Every Little Thing (Jeff Lynne song) =

Single by Jeff Lynne

from the album Armchair Theatre
- B-side: "I'm Gone"
- Released: June 1990
- Recorded: Posh Studios, England 1990
- Genre: Rock, pop rock
- Length: 3:44 (7" and CD); 7:56 (Extended version; 12" and CD only)
- Label: Reprise
- Songwriter(s): Jeff Lynne
- Producer(s): Jeff Lynne

Jeff Lynne singles chronology
"Video!" (1984)	"Every Little Thing" (1990)	"Lift Me Up" (1990)

"Every Little Thing" is a song by Jeff Lynne released as a lead single from his first solo album Armchair Theatre.

The single was released on 12" and CD and featured an extended version of the song and non-album track "I'm Gone". Fellow Traveling Wilburys members George Harrison and Tom Petty made cameo appearances in the Meiert Avis–directed music video that received rotation on VH1 at the time.

"Every Little Thing" flopped in the UK (number 59) and charted at number 9 on Billboard's Mainstream Rock Tracks chart in the US. It also charted at number 31 in Australia.

== Track listing ==
All songs written by Jeff Lynne.

7"

1. "Every Little Thing" – 3:44
2. "I'm Gone" – 2:50

12", CD

1. "Every Little Thing" (12" Remix) – 7:56
2. "Every Little Thing" – 3:44
3. "I'm Gone" – 2:50

== Charts ==
=== Weekly charts ===
Chart (1990)	Peak position
Australia (ARIA)	31
UK Singles (OCC)	59
US Mainstream Rock (Billboard)	9

=== Year-end charts ===
Chart (1990)	Position
Canada Top Singles (RPM)	91
