= Tightrope (Electric Light Orchestra song) =

Song by Electric Light Orchestra

from the album A New World Record
- Released: 1976
- Recorded: 1976
- Genre: Art rock
- Length: 5:03
- Label: Jet Records, United Artists
- Songwriter: Jeff Lynne
- Producer: Jeff Lynne

A New World Record track listing
- 9 tracks Side one: 1. "Tightrope"; 2. "Telephone Line"; 3. "Rockaria!"; 4. "Mission (A World Record)"; Side two: 5. "So Fine"; 6. "Livin' Thing"; 7. "Above the Clouds"; 8. "Do Ya"; 9. "Shangri-La"

"Tightrope" is the opening track to A New World Record by Electric Light Orchestra (ELO).

Recorded in 1976 at Musicland, Munich, West Germany, the song features a dramatic orchestral opening before transforming into an upbeat rock song. Although never released as a single, the song was a fan favorite and has been included on several Electric Light Orchestra compilation albums and many live shows. It was performed live at every ELO concert including the Zoom tour in 2001. It had been remastered in 2000 and included on the box set Flashback. It is the opening number of set four on the 2016 Alone in the Universe tour. When inducting ELO into the Rock and Hall of Fame, Dhani Harrison made several references to the song, saying "Someone had actually thrown me down a line, and my life was changed."

== Lyrics and music ==
The lyrics are about "being in trouble and trying to get help." According to Allmusic critic Donald A. Guarisco, "the lyrics deal with an overwhelmed soul trying to connect with others in a world where 'the city streets are full of people going nowhere making time.'"

The music starts with a slow introduction with choral voices in the background before the song speeds up with violins, followed by drums and then electric guitar. ELO biographer Barry Delve describes the orchestral and choral introduction as "creating a dramatic sense of foreboding" and that as the rock instruments enter he says that "the music spirals downward. sounding exactly like someone falling off a tightrope" before the main part of the song begins. The tempo changes again for a reprise of the slow introduction before speeding up again. Guarisco describes the music as "Beatle-esque", with its "punchy" and "uptempo" verses and an "emotional" refrain. He also notes additional interest in the music formed by symphonic strings and a number of other "ear-catching instrumental touches."

== Reception ==
Music journalist John Van Der Kiste described the song as being "full of those catchy hooks that proclaim it as infectious pop." Delve calls it "a terrific opener" and "an Olympian leap in ELO's sound." Green Bay Press-Gazette staff writer Warren Gerds noted the "fun and fascinating listening" of the song jumping between the symphonic and rock sections. Los Angeles Times critic Robert Hilburn called in an "homage to the infectious pop air of the Beatles." East Kent Times and Mail critic Peter Barnett called it "infectious and deceptively intelligent vocal-dominated pop." Pittsburgh Press critic Pete Bishop said that it "integrates symphonic passages and boogie very adroitly." Toronto Star critic Peter Goddard said that it has "a greater scope than most rock tunes, but [it] never lose[s] the basic rock feeling

== Sampled ==
Samples from "Tightrope" have been featured in various forms in many rap songs, by artists including Army of the Pharaohs, The Game, Chief Kamachi, I-20, and various European rappers like French Rap Group Fonky Family (the track 'Dans la légende' from the Art de Rue album), Sinik ('Règlement extérieur'), Dutch group Lost Rebels ('Revolutie' from the album Revolutie), Croatian rapgroup Tram 11 ( 'Jedno' from the album Vrućina gradskog asfalta), Italian and Dutch synth group Koto ('Mind Machine' from the album From the Dawn of Time), the German rapper Sido ('Goldjunge' from the album Ich), as well as the Albanian rapper Noizy ('Ak' from the album Most Wanted).
