= Out of the Blue (Electric Light Orchestra album) =

Studio album by Electric Light Orchestra
- Released: 24 October 1977 (US); 28 October 1977 (UK)
- Recorded: May–August 1977
- Studios: Musicland Studios, Munich
- Genres: Progressive pop; orchestral pop; art rock
- Length: 70:16
- Labels: Jet; United Artists; CBS
- Producer: Jeff Lynne

Electric Light Orchestra chronology
The Light Shines On (1977)	Out of the Blue (1977)	Three Light Years (1978)

Singles from Out of the Blue
- 1. "Turn to Stone" Released: October 1977 (UK); 2. "Mr. Blue Sky" Released: January 1978 (UK); 3. "Sweet Talkin' Woman" Released: February 1978 (US); 4. "Wild West Hero" Released: May 1978; 5. "It's Over" Released: October 1978

Out of the Blue is the seventh studio album by the British rock group Electric Light Orchestra (ELO), released on 24 October 1977 in the United States and four days later in the UK on 28 October. Written and produced by ELO frontman Jeff Lynne, the double album is among the most commercially successful records in the group's history, selling about 10 million copies worldwide by 2007.

== Recording ==
Jeff Lynne wrote the entire album in three and a half weeks after a sudden burst of creativity while hidden away in his rented chalet in the Swiss Alps. It took a further two months to record in Munich.

== Content ==
Out of the Blue was one of the first pop albums to have an extensive use of the vocoder, and helped to popularize it.

=== Side one ===
The opening track, "Turn to Stone", was described by Donald A. Guarisco as "a good example of Electric Light Orchestra's skill for mixing string-laden pop hooks with driving rock and roll", praising the "array of swirling string lines that dart in and out of the mix and some dazzling falsetto harmonies that interact with Lynne's lead vocal in call and response style". The song features a "tongue-twister section" where the song "stops dead", leaving only "slightly phased" vocals punctuated by Bev Bevan's drum hits.

The following track is "It's Over", which takes on what Billboard described as a "classical feel". Cash Box said that it begins "with simple chording which opens to a strumming beat" and that the "strings add panorama" and that "the vocals are characteristically crystalline and soaring."

"Sweet Talkin' Woman" serves as the band's "first real step into the disco sound [...] a string-laden pop tune whose dance-friendly edge helped it become a disco-era hit". AllMusic's Donald A. Guarisco attributed its disco sound to "Bev Bevan's steady drum work" and "pounding piano lines, delirous bursts of swirling strings, and endlessly overdubbed backing vocals [that] mesh seamlessly to form an ornate but driving funhouse of pop hooks". Billboard described the song as a "catchy rocker characterized by semi-classical elements."

"Across the Border" begins with the same "clanging train" sound effect used on the ABBA song "Nina, Pretty Ballerina" and a violin solo by Mik Kaminski. The song itself takes on a "Mexico-infused" style with a verse melody reminiscent of the Beach Boys' song "Heroes and Villains", and Lynne and Groucutt singing in harmony in a "staccato" vocal style.

=== Side two ===
Side two begins with "Night in the City", which Classic Rock History critic Brian Kachejian rated as ELO's 5th greatest song. Kachejian said that "the song’s chorus and verses, bridge, innovative introductions and ending made for one fun ride." The song begins with an unusual segment where keyboardist Richard Tandy's keyboards emulate "the noise and cacophony of busy traffic", combined with "frenzied" string sections invoking "the oppressive atmosphere of being trapped in a city that never sleeps".

The song "Starlight" was inspired by "the night stars in the mountains of Switzerland". ELO drummer Bev Bevan said that the song was "meant to have a rhythm and blues feeling to it ... something like Al Green." ELO historian Barry Delve describes the song as having a "dreamy night-time vibe".

"Jungle" takes a stylistic left turn, featuring "Tarzan effects, trumpeting elephants, a talking lion, and a Terpsichorean interlude" that Delve describes as part of the song's "unashamed goofiness". The song is divisive among fans, with some seeing it as "an unworthy novelty".

"Believe Me Now" is a short, "dramatic" interlude dominated by piano, orchestra, and vocoder that serves as an introduction to the following song. "Steppin' Out" is a "tender ballad" with lyrics about leaving home. In the final two minutes, the previously stripped-back arrangement is augmented with increasingly large layers of guitars and vocal harmonies, building to a "grand finish". Lynne has said that he regrets his original vocal take on the released song, saying in 2015 "I really messed up the original on Out of the Blue. ... It's just so flimsy."

=== Side three ===
Side three of the release is subtitled Concerto for a Rainy Day, a four-track musical suite with common themes of the weather, inspired by the "relentless rain" Lynne experienced in Switzerland while writing the album. Rain and thunder sound effects, recorded in Munich during the recording of the album, appear at the beginning of the suite, and between each song.

"Standin' in the Rain" opens the suite with a simple, "nursery rhyme-like tune" and quiet, distant weather sounds. After a cymbal crash, the orchestra takes prominence, and a heavily distorted voice, manipulated to resemble thunder crackling, voices the words "A concerto for a rainy day". From this point, the song develops into an "exhilarating instrumental workout" that evokes the intensity of a rainstorm.

"Big Wheels" forms the second part of the suite. The song adds layers of instrumentation as it progresses, building from an intimate beginning towards an "epic" crescendo. In the intro of the song, a vocoder sings a melody that reappears in orchestral form at the end of the last song in the suite, "Mr. Blue Sky". Apart from its inclusion on the Out of the Blue album, the song has never appeared on any of the band's compilations or as a B-side until 2000, when Lynne included it on the group's retrospective Flashback album.

"Summer and Lightning" is the third song in the suite, and takes on a more lively atmosphere. The Guardian's Mark Beaumont praised the song, ranking it as one of the band's best ten songs.

The suite concludes with "Mr. Blue Sky", a lively, optimistic song celebrating sunshine. Jeff Lynne has told the story of how he wrote the song:

The weather had been really bad, and then one day I got up and it was fantastic, the sun was brilliant and shining, all the mountains were lit up and this mist had gone away. It was gorgeous and I came up with "Mr. Blue Sky".

The arrangement has a prominent cowbell-like sound produced by hitting a fire extinguisher, and at the end of the song, a vocoder sings "please turn me over", an instruction to physically turn the vinyl over to listen to the final side. The song was released as the album's second UK single in 1978. It was also released in other countries and territories, some of which removed the final outro with the vocoder.

=== Side four ===
Mark Beaumont said that the first track on Side four, "Sweet Is the Night", "[sweeps] from an elegant glam-funk strut to a chorus that [is] essentially All The Young Dudes base-jumping." Lynne and Groucutt share singing duties again, with lyrics that Delve describes as "the only love song [on the album] with a happy ending".

"The Whale" is an instrumental track that begins with a "flurry of aquatic, atmospheric effects", and uses the stereo soundscape greatly to "convey the ocean's space and expanse." Lynne wrote the song after watching a TV episode about the hunting of whales, and a part of the proceeds from Out of the Blue were donated to environmental advocacy group Greenpeace. ELO historian Barry Delve praised the song, calling it a "a great one to listen to in headphones", though Mark Beaumont was more critical, naming its "lumbering, ambient depths" as one of the worst moments of Out of the Blue, alongside a "shonky side two".

"Birmingham Blues" is a bluesy rock tune with lyrics about life as a touring band and homesickness.

The album closer is "Wild West Hero", which features "yearning" lyrics as well as many tempo and stylistic changes across its runtime. Mark Beaumont described it as "'Hey Jude' on horseback". The song was released as the third single from the album, and reached a peak position of number 6.

== Cover art ==
The large spaceship on the album's cover (by then symbolic of the group) was designed by Kosh with art by Shusei Nagaoka. It was based on the logo Kosh designed for ELO's previous album, A New World Record, and looks like the space station with a docking shuttle from 2001: A Space Odyssey (1968). The number JTLA 823 L2 which is featured on the shuttle arriving at the space station is the original catalogue number for the album. The album also included an insert of a cardboard cutout of the space station as well as a fold-out poster of the band members. The space theme was carried onto the live stage in the form of a huge glowing flying saucer stage set, inside which the band performed.

== Release ==
Out of the Blue was successful upon release, reaching No.4 in both the US and UK charts, as well as No.3 in Australia and No.2 in Sweden. The album spawned five hit singles in different countries, and was ELO's most commercially successful studio album. It was also the first double album in the history of the UK music charts to generate four top twenty hit singles. Lynne considers A New World Record and Out of the Blue to be the group's crowning achievements, and both sold extremely well, reaching multi-platinum according to RIAA Certification. Capital Radio and The Daily Mirror Rock and Pop Awards (forerunner to The Brit Awards) named it "Album of the Year" in 1978. Lynne received his first Ivor Novello award for Outstanding Contributions to British Music the same year.

The US release of Out of the Blue was originally distributed by United Artists. This changed after United Artists Records was sold by Transamerica Corporation to an EMI Records-backed partnership, which triggered Jet Records' change of control clause in its distribution contract, and Jet shifted to CBS Records as its new distributor. American cut-out copies of Out of the Blue soon became widely available at discounted prices in record shops in the US and Canada shortly after the album's release, affecting the album's sales and triggering lawsuits by CBS and Jet. The suits were ultimately unsuccessful in stopping the discounted sales.

=== Reissues ===
The 30th Anniversary Edition was released in February 2007 with three bonus tracks, as part of the Sony/BMG Music Epic/Legacy series and was a limited pressing in hardback book with expanded 24-page full colour booklet. It includes full-length sleeve notes by Lynne and ELO archivist Rob Caiger, as well as rare photos and memorabilia. A push-out replica ELO Space Station is included as well as the standard jewel case edition with a full colour 12-page edited booklet. The album once again reached the top twenty album charts in the UK peaking at number 18. A sixth single "Latitude 88 North" was released as digital download single and as a promo 7" single.

In 2012, Music on Vinyl re-released Out of the Blue on vinyl on Epic; the first 1,000 copies were made on transparent blue vinyl and the rest were released in the standard black vinyl.

In 2017, to celebrate the 40th anniversary of the album, a double picture vinyl disc was released by Sony Music and Epic Records.

== Reception and legacy ==
Professional ratings
Review scores
Source	Rating
AllMusic	3.5/5 stars
The Encyclopedia of Popular Music	5/5 stars
The Guardian	3/5 stars
MusicHound Rock	3/5 stars
Pitchfork	8.1/10
PopMatters	7/10
Record Mirror	4/5 stars
The Rolling Stone Album Guide	3/5 stars

With a four out of 5 stars rating Jim Evans of Record Mirror called Out of the Blue "almost a masterpiece and easily one of the best albums this year. And to better 'A New World Record' is a great achievement." Billy Altman of Rolling Stone said that the album was "meticulously produced and performed" and showed the influence of the Beatles, the Beach Boys and the Bee Gees. However, he detected a lack of passion in the work, which he dismissed as a "totally uninteresting and horrifyingly sterile package" and "All method and no madness: perfectly hollow and bland rock Muzak."

Over the years a more favourable view has developed. Ian Gittens of The Guardian, who gave a 3 out of 5 stars rating, found that "this baroque double album has aged better than the three-chord wonders who derided it." He added "Out of the Blue could have managed without the four-song "suite", Concerto for a Rainy Day, but beneath the lavish over-production tracks like Sweet Talkin' Woman, Turn to Stone and Mr Blue Sky were simply great pop songs." With an 8.1/10 score in a 2007 review Rob Mitchum of Pitchfork wrote "Calling in the string section and commissioning the spaceship cover-art may be a big gamble, but Out of the Blue is proof of how good it can sound when the grand approach works." Dan MacIntosh of PopMatters gave a 7/10 score saying "Even with all the excessive rock trappings inherent during ELO’s era, Out of the Blue nevertheless stands up well as a creative endeavor. Best of all, it has the undiminished ability to break through the clouds with plenty of “Mr. Blue Sky” joy — even now." Chris Jones of the BBC said that "Out of the Blue remains an essential purchase for anyone wishing to bask in their pop perfection."

In 2000, it was voted number 346 in Colin Larkin's All Time Top 1000 Albums. The album was also included in the book 1001 Albums You Must Hear Before You Die.

Rock musician Axl Rose – by his own admission "an old ELO fanatic" – said: "Out of the Blue is an awesome record." In October 2013, the album was ranked 23rd on VH1's list "Double Trouble: The 35 Best-Selling Double Albums of All Time".

== Track listing ==
All songs written by Jeff Lynne.

Side one

1. "Turn to Stone" – 3:47
2. "It's Over" – 4:08
3. "Sweet Talkin' Woman" – 3:47
4. Across the Border" – 3:52

Side two

1. "Night in the City" – 4:02
2. "Starlight" – 4:30
3. "Jungle" – 3:51
4. "Believe Me Now" – 1:21
5. "Steppin' Out" – 4:38

Side three (Concerto for a Rainy Day)

1. "Standin' in the Rain" – 4:20
2. "Big Wheels" – 5:10
3. "Summer and Lightning" – 4:13
4. "Mr. Blue Sky" – 5:05

Side four

1. "Sweet Is the Night" – 3:26
2. "The Whale" (instrumental) – 5:05
3. "Birmingham Blues" – 4:21
4. "Wild West Hero" – 4:40

2007 reissue bonus tracks

1. "Wild West Hero" (alternate bridge; home demo) – 0:26
2. "The Quick and the Daft" (previously unreleased) – 1:49
3. "Latitude 88 North" (previously unreleased; also released as a single) – 3:24

== Personnel ==
Credits according to the record liner notes, unless noted.

Electric Light Orchestra

- Jeff Lynne – lead and backing vocals, lead, rhythm and slide guitars (Gibson EDS-1275, Gibson Les Paul Custom, Gibson Marauder, Ovation 1615/4, Ovation 1619/4), Wurlitzer electric piano, Minimoog, production
- Bev Bevan – backing vocals, drums, rototoms, gong, other percussion, fire extinguisher on "Mr. Blue Sky" (Zildjian cymbals, Slingerland drums, Slingerland Bev Bevan drumsticks, Remo drumheads)
- Richard Tandy – Yamaha C7B piano, Yamaha CS-80, Wurlitzer electric piano, ARP 2600, Minimoog, Polymoog, ARP Omni, ARP Odyssey, Hohner clavinet, SLM Concert Spectrum, Mellotron M400, sequencers, electric guitar (Gibson SG Custom)
- Kelly Groucutt – co-lead vocals on "Sweet Is the Night", backing vocals, bass guitar (Gibson G3), percussion
- Mik Kaminski – violin
- Hugh McDowell – cello
- Melvyn Gale – cello, jangle piano on "Wild West Hero" (uncredited)

Technical personnel

- John Kosh – art director, album cover designer
- Shusei Nagaoka – illustrator
- Mack – engineer
- Jeff Lynne, Richard Tandy and Louis Clark – orchestral and choral arrangements
- Orchestra conducted by Louis Clark
- Original LP mastering – Stan Ricker (USA) and Kevin Metcalfe (UK)

== Charts ==
=== Weekly charts ===
Original release

Chart (1977–1979)	Peak position
Australian Albums (Kent Music Report)	3
Canada Top Albums/CDs (RPM)	2
Dutch Albums (Album Top 100)	3
Finnish Albums (The Official Finnish Charts)	2
German Albums (Offizielle Top 100)	6
Japanese Albums (Oricon)	32
New Zealand Albums (RMNZ)	6
Norwegian Albums (VG-lista)	3
Spanish Albums (AFYVE)	4
Swedish Albums (Sverigetopplistan)	2
UK Albums (Official Charts)	4
US Billboard 200	4
US CashBox Top 100 Albums	5

Reissue

Chart (2007)	Peak position
Scottish Albums (Official Charts)	31
UK Albums (Official Charts)	18

Chart (2025)	Peak position
Greek Albums (IFPI)	26
Scottish Albums (Official Charts)	18

=== Year-end charts ===
Chart (1977)	Peak position
Australian Albums (Kent Music Report)	59
Dutch Albums (Album Top 100)	36
UK Albums (OCC)	48

Chart (1978)	Peak position
Australian Albums (Kent Music Report)	11
Canada Top Albums/CDs (RPM)	46
Dutch Albums (Album Top 100)	15
German Albums (Offizielle Top 100)	17
UK Albums (OCC)	7
US Billboard Year-End	18

Chart (1979)	Peak position
German Albums (Offizielle Top 100)	35
UK Albums (OCC)	26

== Certifications ==
Region	Certification	Certified units/sales
Canada (Music Canada)	Platinum	100,000^{^}
Germany (BVMI)	Gold	250,000^{^}
Netherlands (NVPI)	Gold	50,000^{^}
United Kingdom (BPI)	Platinum	300,000^{^}
United States (RIAA)	Platinum	1,000,000^{^}
^{^} Shipments figures based on certification alone.

== See also ==
- Out of the Blue: Live at Wembley, a concert film from the album's world tour

== Bibliography ==
- Delve, Barry (2022). Electric Light Orchestra: every album, every song. On Track. Sonicbond Publishing. ISBN 978-1-78952-224-2. OCLC 1340403001.
