= Rockaria! =

Single by Electric Light Orchestra

from the album A New World Record
- B-side: "Poker"
- Released: 4 February 1977
- Studio: Musicland Studios, Munich
- Genre: Rock and roll, orchestral pop, symphonic rock
- Length: 3:14 (Album version); 3:10 (Single edit)
- Label: Jet
- Songwriter: Jeff Lynne
- Producer: Jeff Lynne

Electric Light Orchestra singles chronology
"Livin' Thing" (1976)	"Rockaria!" (1977)	"Do Ya" (1977)

A New World Record track listing
- 9 tracks Side one: 1. "Tightrope"; 2. "Telephone Line"; 3. "Rockaria!"; 4. "Mission (A World Record)"; Side two: 5. "So Fine"; 6. "Livin' Thing"; 7. "Above the Clouds"; 8. "Do Ya"; 9. "Shangri-La"

Music video
- "Rockaria!" on YouTube

"Rockaria!" is a song by Electric Light Orchestra (ELO), written by Jeff Lynne. It was the third track on the band's successful 1976 album A New World Record, and was the second single from the album. On some CD pressings of A New World Record, the title appears without the exclamation mark.

== Lyrics and music ==
"Rockaria!" is one of two hard rock 'n' roll songs on A New World Record, the other being "Do Ya". Hartford Courant critic Henry McNulty described the riffs as being "a little bit Gene Vincent and a little bit Little Richard." Allmusic critic Donald A. Guarasco described it as "a stunning tune that combined symphonic swells, operatic vocals, 50's styled guitar riffs and a Beatles-esque melody into one delirious pop song."

The lyrics of "Rockaria!" are about an opera singer who learns to become a rock singer. The opening line is sung in German in operatic fashion and translates as ""far, far away the music is playing." Lynne sings this line in English later in the song. The lyrics allow Lynne to have fun with ELO's concept of combining rock music with some classical music instruments. The chorus references Wagner, Beethoven, Puccini and Verdi, while the final verse mentions Chuck Berry.

== Recording ==
The operatic voice of Mary Thomas is featured on the track, particularly during the introduction. On the first take of the song, Thomas mistakenly began the vocal too early. However, Lynne elected to use that take, complete with her interjection, "Oops!", although the interjection is omitted from the single and from most appearances on compilation albums.

Released as a single in 1977, it reached the Top Ten in the UK Singles Chart. AllMusic noted that the track "is rightly considered to be one of Jeff Lynne's finest achievements on record".

== Reception ==
Released as a single in 1977, it reached the Top Ten in the UK Singles Chart.

McNulty described "Rockaria!" as "one of the most musically explosive songs ELO ever produced." Toronoto Star critic Peter Goddard said that it has "a greater scope than most rock tunes, but [it] never lose[s] the basic rock feeling Reviewing the single, Evening Herald said that it "storms along in great style." Santa Barbara News-Press critic Bill Milton complained that the rock and classical elements don't always jell. Houston Post critic Bob Claypool called it "overinflated", describing it as being "basically a steal from Little Richard's 'I'm Ready' with quasi-operatic effects thrown in."

ELO biographer Barry Delve called "Rockaria!" "one of ELO's best hard rockers; successfully blending opera, a full orchestra and choir" as well as "a cheeky backwards nod to Beethoven's fifth symphony" played on the piano by Richard Tandy. Guarasco felt that it "could very well be the most impressive of the group’s recordings" and that "the novelty of the sound and the imagination poured into "Rockaria" should have made the song a hit in America." He also said that the song is "rightly considered to be one of Jeff Lynne’s finest achievements on record."

== B-side ==
"Poker" is a song written and performed by Electric Light Orchestra. During recording, Kelly Groucutt sang most of the song's lyrics (generally, Jeff Lynne sang the vocals of ELO songs).

The song first appeared as the fifth track on the band's LP Face the Music. The song twice appeared as a B-side, first of "Rockaria!" in the UK, then in 1979 as the flip side of the US single version of "Confusion".

== Personnel ==
- Jeff Lynne – lead vocals, electric guitar, Wurlitzer 200 electric piano
- Bev Bevan – drums, percussion, backing vocals
- Kelly Groucutt – bass guitar, backing vocals
- Richard Tandy – piano
- Mik Kaminski – violin
- Hugh McDowell – cello
- Melvyn Gale – cello
- Mary Thomas – operatic vocals
- Patti Quatro – uncredited backing vocals
- Brie Brandt – uncredited backing vocals
- Addie Lee – uncredited backing vocals

== Chart positions ==
=== Weekly charts ===
Chart (1977)	Peak position
Australia (Kent Music Report)	10
Austria (Ö3 Austria Top 40)	7
Belgium (Ultratop 50 Flanders)	26
Netherlands (Dutch Top 40)	28
Netherlands (Single Top 100)	23
UK Singles (Official Charts)	9

=== Year-end charts ===
Chart (1977)	Position
Australia (Kent Music Report)	59

== Jeff Lynne version ==
Jeff Lynne re-recorded the song in his home studio. It was released on Mr. Blue Sky: The Very Best of Electric Light Orchestra, a compilation album with other re-recorded ELO songs, under the ELO name, as an iTunes Store exclusive bonus track.
