= A New World Record =

Studio album by Electric Light Orchestra
- Released: 15 October 1976
- Recorded: July 1976
- Studios: Musicland Studios, Munich, Germany; string and choral overdubs at De Lane Lea Studios, Wembley; fixes at Cherokee Studios, Los Angeles
- Genres: Progressive pop; pop rock; orchestral pop
- Length: 36:20
- Labels: Jet; United Artists
- Producer: Jeff Lynne

Electric Light Orchestra chronology
Olé ELO (1976)	A New World Record (1976)	The Light Shines On (1977)

Singles from A New World Record
- 1. "Livin' Thing" Released: October 1976; 2. "Do Ya" Released: January 1977 (US); 3. "Rockaria!" Released: February 1977 (UK); 4. "Telephone Line" Released: May 1977

A New World Record is the sixth studio album by the English rock band Electric Light Orchestra (ELO). It was released on 15 October 1976, by United Artists Records in the United States and on 19 November 1976, by Jet Records in the United Kingdom. A New World Record marked ELO's shift towards shorter pop songs, a trend which would continue across their career.

Their second album to be recorded at Musicland Studios in Munich, the LP proved to be the band's breakthrough in the UK; after their previous three studio recordings failed to chart in their home country, A New World Record became their first top ten album on the UK Albums Chart. It became a global success and reached multi-platinum status in the US and UK. The album sold five million units worldwide within its first year of release. The cover art features the ELO logo, designed by Kosh, for the first time; this logo would be included on most of the group's subsequent releases. The album yielded four hit singles, including "Livin' Thing", the transatlantic top ten hit "Telephone Line", which became the band's first gold-certified US single, the UK top ten hit "Rockaria!", and the US number 24 hit "Do Ya", a cover of the 1972 single by The Move, of which Lynne was a member between 1970 and 1972.

In 1977, four of the album's songs were featured on the soundtrack of the film Joyride. In 2006, the album was remastered and released with bonus tracks on Sony's Epic/Legacy imprint. "Surrender" was also issued as a promotional single and an iTunes download single, which entered the Top 100 download chart. The track was originally written in 1976 for a cancelled film soundtrack and was finished in 2006. In July 2012, the all vinyl record company Music on Vinyl re-released A New World Record on 180-gram vinyl with an embossed cover.

== Background ==
The band's frontman Jeff Lynne regarded his own songwriting at this point to have reached a new high.

"The songs started to flow and most of them came quickly to me. To have all those hits, it was just ...I mean amazing really. Going from doing okay for probably three or four years to suddenly being in the big time, it was a strange but great thing."

– Jeff Lynne 2006; A New World Record remaster

Patti Quatro, Brie Brandt (both of Fanny) and Addie Lee sang uncredited backing vocals on the album.

== Critical reception ==
Professional ratings
Review scores
Source	Rating
AllMusic	4.5/5 stars
Christgau's Record Guide	B+
Encyclopedia of Popular Music	4/5 stars
MusicHound	4/5
Q	3/5 stars
Record Mirror	3/5 stars
The Rolling Stone Album Guide	3/5 stars
Sounds	4.5/5 stars
Melody Maker	(favourable)
New Musical Express	(favourable)

The album was well received by the music press. In the UK, Harry Doherty of Melody Maker recalled that when Lynne and Roy Wood had formed ELO it was to create "a group that would merge the excitement and colour of rock and roll with the clear lines of classical music", and that "A New World Record is, I feel, the closest that the Electric Light Orchestra have come to realising this". In his opinion the album "takes a giant leap forward... the most striking progression on this album is the use of orchestra and choir. Strings are no longer a novelty." In conclusion, Doherty stated that "A New World Record is ELO's best album in its seven-year history, the most complete of them all. They're a band who haven't yet gained the attention in this country that they deserve. Acquiring this album would be a fine way to change all that." NME's Bob Edmands complimented Lynne's songwriting, saying, "This is, in fact, a very ambitious album, possibly the most sophisticated the band have put out. But random experiments are no way to crack the States or to stay in favour there, and the complexity on this set is all in the service of strong melodic songs." Edmands also agreed with Doherty that ELO deserved to be recognised as a major outfit in the UK, saying, "Lynne and his band are in the front rank of the nation's rock experts, and it's time their standing was properly acknowledged at home".

Robin Smith of Record Mirror said, "Combining electric guitars with highbrow symphonies is a pretty crazy combination, but for the ELO it works. Often the music borders on clumsiness and the lyrics are sometimes silly, but the band's sense of fun carries them through." Tim Lott of Sounds declared that "with A New World Record Lynne has captured the essential atmosphere of sophisticated pop without sounding overblown or cheap. Each of the nine tracks is immediate, commercial, professional." He noted some minor failings with the record, but that they were outweighed by the album's positive aspects, and concluded, "There ain't a duff track anywhere. And trying to balance the superlatives with useless nitpicking and the 'relevance' of supposed old farts like Lynne would be sheer crap."

In the U.S. Alan Niester had some reservations in his review for Rolling Stone, feeling that the record was something of a "treading of the creative waters" and that the group were at that point "a band, now peaking in popularity, that is attempting to supply audiences with exactly the sound they want to hear". However, Niester then went on to note that "Lynne has always been rather deft with the melodic hook, and both 'Livin' Thing' and 'So Fine' are irresistible additions to his list of catchiest tunes. Numbers like 'Mission (A World Record)' and 'Shangri-la' continue the history of classy orchestral stylings that really rock." He concluded, "By Christmas, A New World Record should be a staple in a million homes". Robert Christgau stated that it was the album that changed his mind about the band, who he said had "made a Moody Blues album with brains, hooks, and laffs galore".

In his retrospective review for AllMusic Bruce Eder compared A New World Record with ELO's follow-up, the double album Out of the Blue, and felt that the former album was the better of the two, being "a more modest-sized creation chock full of superb songs that are produced even better... A New World Record contains seven of the best songs ever to come out of the group. The Beatles influence is present, to be sure, but developed to a very high degree of sophistication and on Lynne's own terms, rather than being imitative of specific songs."

Cash Box said that "the album holds together, with haunting cuts like 'Above The Clouds' juxtaposed against faster numbers like 'Tightrope.'"

== Track listing ==
All tracks are written by Jeff Lynne.

Side one
No.	Title	Length
1.	"Tightrope"	5:00
2.	"Telephone Line"	4:38
3.	"Rockaria!"	3:12
4.	"Mission (A World Record)"	4:24

Side two
No.	Title	Length
5.	"So Fine"	3:55
6.	"Livin' Thing"	3:31
7.	"Above the Clouds"	2:16
8.	"Do Ya"	3:45
9.	"Shangri-La"	5:34

2006 remaster bonus tracks
No.	Title	Length
10.	"Telephone Line" (different vocal)	4:41
11.	"Surrender" (previously unreleased; also released as a single)	2:37
12.	"Tightrope" (early instrumental rough mix)	4:55
13.	"Above the Clouds" (early instrumental rough mix)	1:14
14.	"So Fine" (early instrumental rough mix)	4:16
15.	"Telephone Line" (instrumental)	4:51

Some cassette tape versions were rearranged to have "Shangri-La" at the end of side one and "Telephone Line" at the end of side two, while others featured the same order as the LP.

== Personnel ==
Sourced from the original album liner notes unless where noted.

- Jeff Lynne – lead vocals, electric and acoustic guitars, percussion, Wurlitzer 200 electric piano
- Bev Bevan – drums, percussion, Minimoog "drum", backing vocals
- Richard Tandy – Wurlitzer 200 electric piano, Minimoog, Micromoog, clavinet, piano, SLM Concert Spectrum, Mellotron M400, electric guitar, percussion, backing vocals
- Kelly Groucutt – bass guitar, percussion, backing vocals, lead vocals
- Mik Kaminski – violin
- Hugh McDowell – cello, percussion
- Melvyn Gale – cello

Additional personnel

- Mary Thomas – operatic vocals
- Patti Quatro – uncredited backing vocals
- Brie Brandt – uncredited backing vocals
- Addie Lee – uncredited backing vocals
- Mack – engineer
- Orchestra and choral arrangements – Louis Clark, Jeff Lynne, Richard Tandy
- Orchestra conducted by Louis Clark
- Duane Scott – Engineer for USA edit
- John Kosh- Art Director, Album Cover Designer, ELO logo Designer

== Charts ==
=== Weekly charts ===
Chart (1976–1978)	Peak position
Australian Albums (Kent Music Report)	1
Austrian Albums (Ö3 Austria)	9
Canada Top Albums/CDs (RPM)	1
Danish Albums (Hitlister)	8
Dutch Albums (Album Top 100)	2
Finnish Albums (The Official Finnish Charts)	1
German Albums (Offizielle Top 100)	7
Japanese Albums (Oricon)	60
New Zealand Albums (RMNZ)	4
Norwegian Albums (VG-lista)	9
Spanish Albums (AFYVE)	6
Swedish Albums (Sverigetopplistan)	1
UK Albums (Official Charts)	6
US Billboard 200	5
US Cash Box Top 100 Albums	10

=== Year-end charts ===
Chart (1976)	Peak position
Canada Top Albums/CDs (RPM)	60
Dutch Albums (Albums Top 100)	37

Chart (1977)	Peak position
Australian Albums (Kent Music Report)	2
Austrian Albums Chart (Ö3 Austria)	21
Canada Top Albums/CDs (RPM)	3
Dutch Albums (Albums Top 100)	48
German Albums (Offizielle Top 100)	20
UK Albums (OCC)	16
US Billboard Year-End	6

Chart (1978)	Peak position
Australian Albums (Kent Music Report)	22
UK Albums (OCC)	47

== Certifications ==
Region	Certification	Certified units/sales
Canada (Music Canada)	2× Platinum	200,000^{^}
Finland (Musiikkituottajat)	Gold	25,200
Netherlands (NVPI)	Gold	50,000^{^}
United Kingdom (BPI)	Platinum	300,000^{^}
United States (RIAA)	Platinum	1,000,000^{^}
^{^} Shipments figures based on certification alone.
