= Livin' Thing =

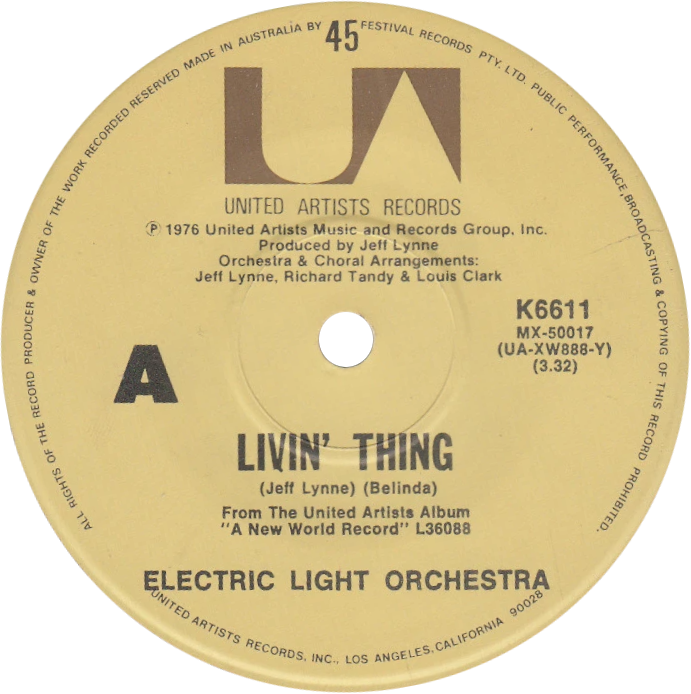
- Side A of the Australian single

Single by Electric Light Orchestra

from the album A New World Record
- B-side: "Fire On High" (UK); "Ma-Ma-Ma Belle" (US)
- Released: 29 October 1976
- Studio: Musicland, Munich
- Genre: Symphonic rock; electronic rock
- Length: 3:32
- Label: Jet; United Artists (UK); United Artists (US)
- Songwriter: Jeff Lynne
- Producer: Jeff Lynne

Electric Light Orchestra singles chronology
"Nightrider" (1976)	"Livin' Thing" (1976)	"Rockaria!" (1977)

A New World Record track listing
- 9 tracks Side one: 1. "Tightrope"; 2. "Telephone Line"; 3. "Rockaria!"; 4. "Mission (A World Record)"; Side two: 5. "So Fine"; 6. "Livin' Thing"; 7. "Above the Clouds"; 8. "Do Ya"; 9. "Shangri-La"

Audio sample
- "Livin' Thing": file; help

Music video
- "Livin' Thing" on YouTube

"Livin' Thing" is a song written by Jeff Lynne and performed by Electric Light Orchestra (ELO). It appears on ELO's 1976 album A New World Record and was also released as a single. Patti Quatro sang uncredited vocals, particularly the "higher and higher" parts. The original single had "Fire On High" on the flip side, a tune that became the band's most popular instrumental piece.

== Background ==
"Livin' Thing" makes prominent use of augmented chords. Lynne said about that:

"Livin' Thing" had an augmented chord. George (Harrison) used a lot of those chords, too. I think the influence of using those types of chords came from the Long Wave sort of songs. Trying to marry the two styles together, trying to put those funny old Victorian chords into a new song gives it a good lift. It makes it more of a special song, because it’s got a weird chord in it, and nobody knows how to play it. "Livin' Thing" has that. There’s a few of mine that have those type of chords in it. I tried to make the songs a little different. "Livin' Thing" would have had a much more normal run-of-the-mill chord sequence otherwise; the chorus would have been C, A minor, F and G instead of C, A minor, D minor, G augmented and back to the C. That G augmented chord adds a little bit of tension and uplift to the song. That chord is more along the lines of the Long Wave songs than the pop idiom. I’m sure I was bringing in those type of chords subconsciously, but I was exposed to all those chords early on, and I’m obviously gonna take them on board with all the more rock and roll chords. I’ve used wacky chords in a lot of my tunes, like "All Over the World", which has a naughty one, as well.

AllMusic's writer Stewart Mason described the song structure:

[it] opens with a mock-Spanish orchestral flourish before swinging into a more typical mid-tempo ELO rocker, driven by a battery of acoustic rhythm guitars on the verses and modulating upwards into a falsetto Jeff Lynne vocal on a chorus that’s powered by an even more prominent than usual contribution from the group's string section", adding that it lacks "that impossible-to-dislodge hook that typified Lynne's most successful songs from this era, but it's still a darn sight better than most of what was at the top of the charts in late 1976".

== Critical reception ==
Los Angeles Times critic Robert Hilburn called it an "extremely catchy record that has all the vocal and instrumental hooks to keep you listening." Billboard said that it "moves through a dark U.K. rock distillation into a soaring, ethereal chorale and a return to the minor-key mode." Cash Box said that "a diabolical arrangement hits hard along with some ever ready harmonies which sew this record up into sure hit potential." Record World called it a "Jeff Lynne masterwork" and said that "a savory rock sound makes it happen."

Ultimate Classic Rock critic Michael Gallucci rated it ELO's second best song, specifically praising the "string-solo opening, soulful backing vocals, synth waves occasionally crashing into the chorus and a gigantic hook." Classic Rock History critic Brian Kachejian rated it as ELO's 6th best song. Stereogum contributor Ryan Reed rated it as ELO's 5th best song, saying that "From the dramatic classical opening, incorporating pizzicato strings, to the extended chorus fade-out, this one’s pure pop pleasure."

In August 2006, "Livin' Thing" was named by the UK's Q as the number 1 "Guilty Pleasure" single of all time – a list designed to celebrate "uncool" but excellent records, and which received considerable publicity.

== Charts ==
=== Weekly charts ===
Chart (1976–1977)	Peak position
Australia (Kent Music Report)	2
Austria (Ö3 Austria Top 40)	3
Belgium (Ultratop 50 Flanders)	8
Canada Adult Contemporary (RPM)	41
Canada Top Singles (RPM)	8
Ireland (IRMA)	6
Netherlands (Dutch Top 40)	6
Netherlands (Single Top 100)	4
New Zealand (Recorded Music NZ)	4
South Africa (Springbok Radio)	1
Spain (AFE)	11
Sweden (Sverigetopplistan)	17
UK Singles (Official Charts)	4
US Billboard Hot 100	13
US Billboard Adult Contemporary	36
US Cash Box	10
US Record World	10
West Germany (GfK)	5

=== Year-end charts ===
Chart (1976)	Rank
Canada Top Singles (RPM)	106
Netherlands (Single Top 100)	85

Chart (1977)	Rank
Australia (Kent Music Report)	27
Austria (Ö3 Austria Top 40)	25
Canada Top Singles (RPM)	106
South Africa (Springbok Radio)	16
US Billboard	77

== Certifications ==
Region	Certification	Certified units/sales
New Zealand (RMNZ)	Platinum	30,000^{‡}
United Kingdom (BPI)	Platinum	600,000^{‡}
United States (RIAA)	Gold	500,000^{‡}
^{‡} Sales+streaming figures based on certification alone.

== Jeff Lynne version ==
Jeff Lynne re-recorded the song in his own home studio. It was released in a compilation album with other re-recorded ELO songs, under the ELO name.

== Covers ==
In 2001, PFR covered the track on the album Lynne Me Your Ears – A Tribute to the Music of Jeff Lynne.

In 2004, The Beautiful South covered the track for their covers album Golddiggas, Headnodders and Pholk Songs. It reached number 24 on the UK charts and number 26 on the Irish charts.

Livin' Thing – CD1 (Sony Music UK; 6753711)

1. Livin' Thing [3:17]
2. I'm Living Good [4:00]

Livin' Thing – CD2 (Sony Music UK; 6753712)

1. Livin' Thing [3:17]
2. Lovin' You [2:53]
3. Another Night with the Boys [3:32]

Chart (2004)	Peak position
Ireland (IRMA)	26
UK Singles (Official Charts)	24

== Uses in other media ==
In 2017, "Livin' Thing" was featured in Telltale's Guardians of the Galaxy game.

The 1997 feature film Boogie Nights includes the track for the final scene and end credits of the film. Initially, Jeff Lynne refused to release the rights to the song, but changed his mind after viewing a screening of the film with director Paul Thomas Anderson and being impressed.

The song was featured in the film Cruella in 2021.
