= Telephone Line (song) =

Single by Electric Light Orchestra

from the album A New World Record
- B-side: "Poor Boy (The Greenwood)"; "King of the Universe"
- Released: May 1977
- Studio: Musicland (Munich, West Germany)
- Genre: Symphonic rock; orchestral pop; progressive pop; soft rock; electronic rock
- Length: 4:39 (album/UK single version); 3:56 (US single edit)
- Label: Jet
- Songwriter: Jeff Lynne
- Producer: Jeff Lynne

Electric Light Orchestra singles chronology
"Do Ya" (1977)	"Telephone Line" (1977)	"Turn to Stone" (1977)

A New World Record track listing
- 9 tracks Side one: 1. "Tightrope"; 2. "Telephone Line"; 3. "Rockaria!"; 4. "Mission (A World Record)"; Side two: 5. "So Fine"; 6. "Livin' Thing"; 7. "Above the Clouds"; 8. "Do Ya"; 9. "Shangri-La"

"Telephone Line" is a song by English rock band Electric Light Orchestra (ELO). It was released in May 1977 through Jet Records and United Artists Records as part of the album A New World Record. It was commercially successful, topping the charts of Canada and New Zealand and entering the top 10 in Australia, the United Kingdom, and the United States.

== Background ==
The ballad is track two on their 1976 album, A New World Record, and was the final single to be released from the album until September 2006, when "Surrender" was released from the expanded reissue of the album. It became their biggest single success in the US and was their first UK gold award for a single.

The lyrics are about a man listening to the ringing on his telephone waiting and hoping for a girl to answer his call and imagining what he would say if she answers.

With ELO's continuing success in America it seemed obvious to frontman Jeff Lynne to use an American ring tone during the song. Lynne explained:

To get the sound on the beginning, you know, the American telephone sound, we phoned from England to America to a number that we know nobody would be at, to just listen to it for a while. On the Moog, we recreated the sound exactly by tuning the oscillators to the same notes as the ringing of the phone.

The song charted in the Top Ten in both the UK and the US, peaking at number 8 in the UK and number 7 in the US. It was on the Hot 100 for 23 weeks, nearly a full month longer on that chart than any other ELO song. Billboard ranked it as the No. 15 song of 1977. In 1977, the song reached number 1 in New Zealand and Canada. "Telephone Line" and Meri Wilson's "Telephone Man" were back-to-back on Hot 100's top 40 for two non-consecutive weeks in the summer of 1977.

As was the norm, many ELO singles were issued in different colours, but the US version of the single was the only green single ELO issued. The US single also was shortened to 3:56 with an early fade. It became the band's first single to achieve Gold sales figures.

== Critical reception ==
AllMusic's Donald Guarisco said the song's lyrics "use the scenario of a lovelorn narrator trying to talk a telephone operator into connecting him with a lover who will not answer her phone, a scenario that has been used in songs as diverse as 'Memphis, Tennessee' and 'Operator'," adding that the song "could have easily become an over-the-top exercise in camp but is saved by a gorgeous melody that contrasts verses full of yearning highs and aching lows with a descending-note chorus that clinches the song's heartbroken feel." He concluded that the arrangement transformed "Telephone Line" into a "miniature symphony".

AllMusic's Bruce Eder said that "Telephone Line" "might be the best Lennon–McCartney collaboration that never was, lyrical and soaring in a way that manages to echo elements of Revolver and the Beatles without ever mimicking them." Stereogum contributor Ryan Reed rated it as ELO's best song, calling it "a high watermark for harmony, humor, arrangement, production, engineering, and emotion." Ultimate Classic Rock critic Michael Gallucci rated it ELO's 4th best song, calling it a "futuristic-sounding song with a classic melody." Classic Rock History critic Brian Kachejian rated it as ELO's 3rd best song, calling it "perfect pop music surrounded by incredible production and originality that had made Jeff Lynne one of rock and roll’s greatest treasures." Kachejian also said that the song seems to encompass every genre of music "from doo-wop to pop to progressive."

Billboard felt that production elements such as the telephone sound effects and "doo-wah chorus" gave the song a "50s feel" and credited the orchestration for the song's success. Cash Box said that "Jeff Lynne's voice verges on the choking sob, and the unearthy strings and 'doobie-doo-wa's' should clinch top 40 ears." Record World called it a "rock ballad of lost love" that is an example of "ELO's ability to take familiar rock 'n' roll structures and transform them into space epics."

In 2022, Lynne listed it as one of his nine favourite ELO songs.

== Jeff Lynne versions ==
In 2012, as part of the concert from his home studio, Live from Bungalow Palace, Lynne performed an acoustic version of the song with longtime ELO pianist Richard Tandy.

A re-recorded version of the song by Lynne in his home studio was released on the 2012 compilation album Mr. Blue Sky: The Very Best of Electric Light Orchestra with other re-recorded ELO songs, under the ELO name.

== Charts ==
=== Weekly charts ===
Chart (1977)	Peak position
Australia (Kent Music Report)	10
Belgium (Ultratop 50 Flanders)	23
Belgium (Ultratop 50 Wallonia)	48
Canada Top Singles (RPM)	1
Canada Adult Contemporary (RPM)	50
New Zealand (Recorded Music NZ)	1
UK Singles (Official Charts)	8
US Billboard Hot 100	7
US Cash Box Top 100 Singles	4
US Radio & Records (R&R)	4
West Germany (GfK)	32

=== Year-end charts ===
Chart (1977)	Rank
Australia (Kent Music Report)	68
Canada Top Singles (RPM)	21
New Zealand (RIANZ)	8
US Billboard	15
US Cash Box Top 100 Singles	29

== Certifications ==
Region	Certification	Certified units/sales
Canada (Music Canada)	Gold	75,000^{^}
New Zealand (RMNZ)	Gold	15,000^{‡}
United Kingdom (BPI)	Silver	200,000^{‡}
United States (RIAA)	Platinum	1,000,000^{‡}
^{^} Shipments figures based on certification alone.^{‡} Sales+streaming figures based on certification alone.

== Covers and other uses ==
"Telephone Line" is the theme song of the 1977 film Joyride starring Desi Arnaz Jr., Robert Carradine, Melanie Griffith, and Anne Lockhart, directed by Joseph Ruben.

The song is also featured in the movie Billy Madison. when Billy (Adam Sandler) phones his former high school classmate Danny McGrath, played by Steve Buscemi, to apologize for picking on him.

On television, it was used on the HBO series Big Love in the season 2 episode "Vision Thing", and was playing in a car during the Malcolm in the Middle season 4 episode, "Malcolm Holds His Tongue".

Telephone Line has been covered by several artists, including Jeffrey Foskett on the Jeff Lynne Tribute CD Lynne Me Your Ears, Irish band Aslan, and duo Jack and White, featuring American Idol finalist Brooke White, on their covers EP Undercover which also featured guest vocals from Fitz of Fitz and the Tantrums. The song was also covered internationally by French singer Claude François as "Sacrée chanson", and the Mexican band Grupo Yndio as "Línea Telefónica".
