= Do Ya (The Move song) =

1971 song covered by the Move and by ELO

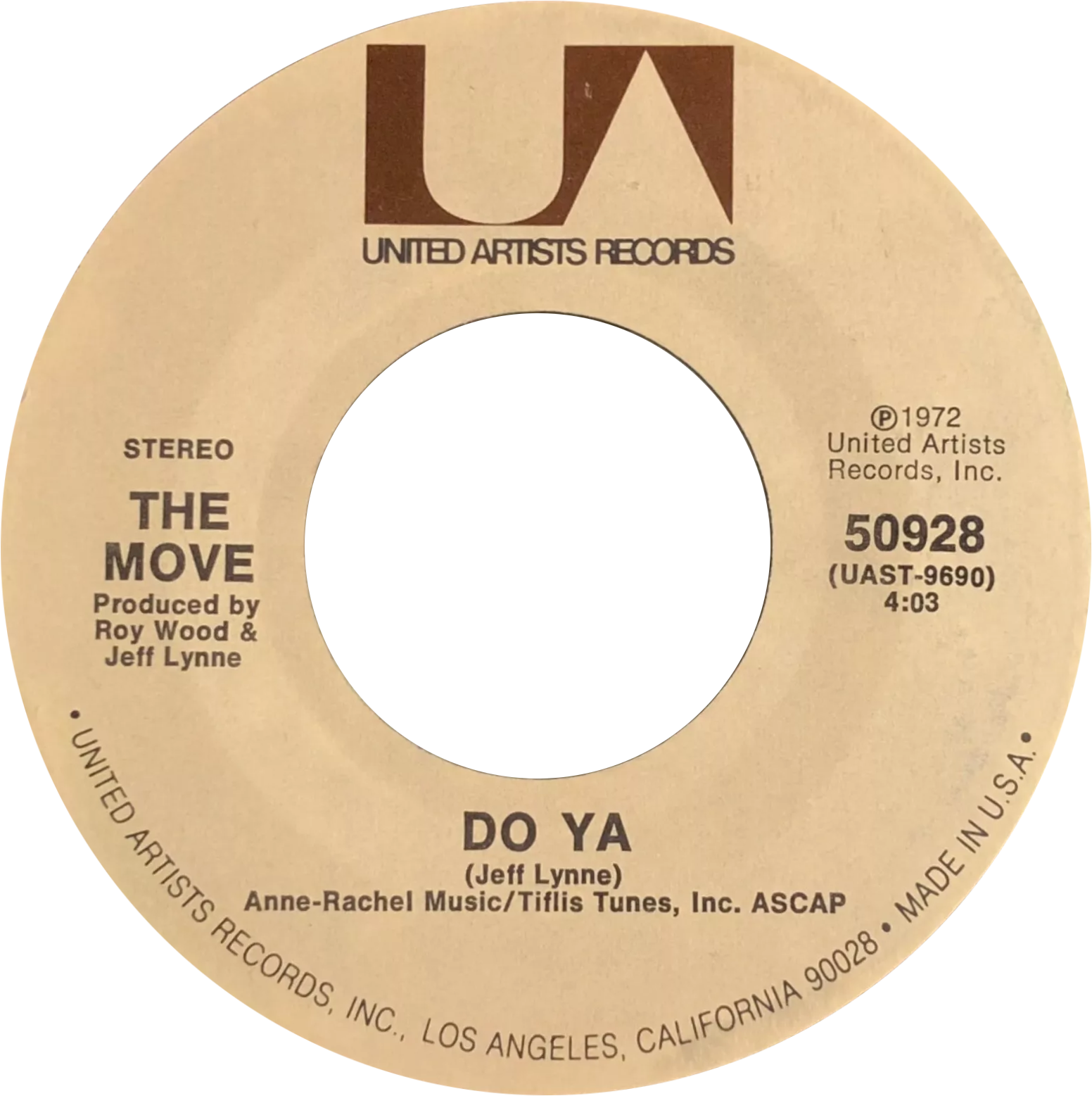
- US release of the Move recording

Single by The Move
- A-side: "California Man"
- B-side: "No Time" (UK)
- Released: June 1972 (US); 13 September 1974 (UK)
- Recorded: 19 December 1971
- Studio: Philips (London)
- Genre: Glam rock
- Length: 4:06; 3:16 (1974 UK single)
- Label: United Artists (US); Harvest (UK)
- Songwriter: Jeff Lynne
- Producers: Roy Wood, Jeff Lynne

The Move singles chronology
| "California Man" (1972) | "Do Ya" (1972) |

"Do Ya" is a song written by Jeff Lynne, that was originally recorded by The Move, which became a hit for the Electric Light Orchestra (led by Lynne, ELO originally being a side project of The Move) in 1977.

== Release ==
Written by Jeff Lynne when he was "about 22", it was one of two songs featured on the B-side of the UK hit "California Man" credited to The Move (the other was Roy Wood's "Ella James"). In the United States the B-side proved more popular than the A and so the song became the group's only US hit, albeit a minor one (reaching number 93 on the Billboard Hot 100 chart). The song was originally titled "Look Out Baby, There's a Plane A Comin'" (which is sung by Wood at the end of the song). The song was later included on the 2005 remastered version of the Message from the Country album, in both the original single version and an alternate take.

The song was recorded on the same multireel tapes alongside the Electric Light Orchestra (ELO) tracks "From the Sun to the World" and "In Old England Town", the two songs that Wood appeared on from the ELO 2 album.

Record World called it "a highly exciting tune complete with Beatlish harmonies and riffs."

== Chart position ==
| Chart (1972) | Peak Position |
|---|---|
| US Billboard Hot 100 | 93 |

== Electric Light Orchestra version ==
"Do Ya"

Single by Electric Light Orchestra

from the album A New World Record
- B-side: "Nightrider"
- Released: January 1977 (US)
- Recorded: 1976 Musicland Studios, Munich
- Genre: Hard rock; pop rock; power pop
- Length: 3:47
- Label: Jet/United Artists
- Songwriter: Jeff Lynne
- Producer: Jeff Lynne

Electric Light Orchestra singles chronology
| "Rockaria!" (1977) | "Do Ya" (1977) | "Telephone Line" (1977) |

A New World Record track listing
- 9 tracks Side one: 1. "Tightrope"; 2. "Telephone Line"; 3. "Rockaria!"; 4. "Mission (A World Record)"; Side two: 5. "So Fine"; 6. "Livin' Thing"; 7. "Above the Clouds"; 8. "Do Ya"; 9. "Shangri-La"

Audio
- "Do Ya" on YouTube

Electric Light Orchestra (ELO) began to perform "Do Ya" live with Lynne on lead vocals from 1973 to 1975, and also integrated its riff into live versions of "10538 Overture" as heard on their 1974 live album The Night the Light Went On in Long Beach. They recorded it in the studio for inclusion on the 1976 album A New World Record. In a 1978 interview for Australian radio stations 2SM and 3XY, Bev Bevan stated the reason for the re-recording was that, after ELO had added the song to their live performances, a music journalist asked the band their opinion of "the original version" by Todd Rundgren. (Utopia, a band Rundgren started in 1974, had been performing "Do Ya" in concert, and included a live recording on the 1975 Another Live.) Bevan said they decided to re-record it as ELO in order to "let everyone know that it's a Jeff Lynne song."

According to Billboard it has "an irresistibly catchy melody line and syncopated beat." Cash Box wrote that it was "a smash for the Move and that this arrangement treats the classic with all the respect it demands." Record World said that ELO "embellish[ed] the song with a lavish production."

Ultimate Classic Rock critic Michael Gallucci rated it ELO's seventh best song, writing that it features one of rock's all-time greatest guitar riffs."

Something Else! critic S. Victor Aaron said that "ELO had never rocked harder" and that "By this time, Lynne had achieved complete mastery of the delicate balance between rock and orchestral arrangements, and even the heavy presence of strings didn’t do anything to take away from the song’s raw, cocksure bent, with Lynne growling and boasting to his target for affections about all the things he’s seen 'but never seen nuttin’ like you.'"

In 2000, Lynne found an unedited alternative mix for the song, also recorded in 1976, that he decided he preferred over the album cut. A digital remaster of the track is included on the compilation box set Flashback.

=== Weekly charts ===
| Chart (1977) | Peak position |
|---|---|
| Canada RPM Top 100 | 13 |
| German Media Control Singles Chart | 42 |
| US Billboard Hot 100 | 24 |
| US Cash Box Top 100 Singles | 16 |
| US Record World Singles | 25 |
| US Radio & Records (R&R) | 27 |

=== Year-end charts ===
| Chart (1977) | Rank |
|---|---|
| Canada | 120 |
| U.S. (Joel Whitburn's Pop Annual) | 151 |

=== Jeff Lynne version ===
Jeff Lynne re-recorded the song in his own home studio. It was released on the compilation album Mr. Blue Sky: The Very Best of Electric Light Orchestra with other re-recorded ELO songs under the ELO name.

== Other versions ==
Former Kiss guitarist Ace Frehley covered "Do Ya" on his 1989 solo album Trouble Walkin'. Todd Rundgren recorded the song with his band Utopia on the 1975 live album Another Live, and his 1998 album Somewhere/Anywhere, a collection of unreleased tracks, the title of which is a pun on Rundgren's 1972 release Something/Anything?. Rundgren also performed it with Utopia on the 2019 live DVD/CD release recorded at Chicago Theatre in 2018.
