= Turn to Stone (Electric Light Orchestra song) =

Single by Electric Light Orchestra

from the album Out of the Blue
- B-side: "Mister Kingdom"
- Released: 14 October 1977
- Studio: Musicland, Munich, Germany
- Genre: Rock; pop
- Length: 3:47
- Label: Jet
- Songwriter: Jeff Lynne
- Producer: Jeff Lynne

Electric Light Orchestra singles chronology
"Telephone Line" (1977)	"Turn to Stone" (1977)	"Mr. Blue Sky" (1978)

Music video
- "Turn to Stone" on YouTube

"Turn to Stone" is a 1977 song by Electric Light Orchestra (ELO).

The song is the opening track to the double album Out of the Blue. It was the first song released as a single from the LP. The single reached No. 18 in the United Kingdom charts and spent twelve weeks on the chart. Out of four singles from the album, "Turn to Stone" was the only song not to reach the top ten in the United Kingdom singles charts. The song reached No. 13 in the United States and number nine in Canada in early 1978.

The song was composed in Switzerland during Jeff Lynne's two-week writing marathon for his double album. Lynne played the Moog bassline of the song.

The orchestra arrangement at the very end of the song was inspired by the orchestral portions of "A Day in the Life" by The Beatles.

Lynne has called "Turn to Stone" one of his favourite songs, saying "It’s just so primary and simple, but yet very evocative. I love the shuffle beat." Lynne has also said "There’s a part in the middle where I talk super fast. I just felt like it needed something simple in the middle of the song. I often used to put a funny little piece in a song just in case I get bored with it. I’d go, 'Well, maybe this is going on too long. I’ll think of something daft to put in there.'"

On 4 November 2008, Lynne was awarded a BMI (Broadcast Music, Inc.) Million-Air certificate for "Turn to Stone" for having one million airplays.

== Reviews ==
AllMusic reviewer Zachary Curd called the song "Essentially a love song, 'Turn to Stone' is orchestrated, computerized, epic rock music courtesy of Jeff Lynne." The song was also reviewed by Donald A. Guarisco who stated "This dynamic opener from the Out of the Blue album is a good example of Electric Light Orchestra's skill for mixing string-laden pop hooks with driving rock and roll." He also stated "It also works in an array of swirling string lines that dart in and out of the mix and some dazzling falsetto harmonies that interact with Lynne's lead vocal in call and response style".

Billboard called "Turn to Stone" a "driving, high energy rocker" with a "demonic cello [setting] the pace." Record World said of it that "Echoes of a dozen pop hits resonate through [the song], yet the record clearly bears the Jeff Lynne stamp."

Ultimate Classic Rock critic Michael Gallucci rated it ELO's 5th best song, saying that it "comes with a Godzilla-size hook that stomps over everything in its way" and that the symphony of strings on the refrains is "awesome."

== Charts ==
=== Weekly charts ===
Chart (1977–1978)	Peak position
Australia (Kent Music Report)	17
Belgium (Ultratop 50 Flanders)	30
Canada Top Singles (RPM)	9
Germany (GfK)	32
Netherlands (Dutch Top 40)	11
Netherlands (Single Top 100)	23
New Zealand (Recorded Music NZ)	21
South Africa (Springbok Radio)	17
Spain (AFYVE)	25
Sweden (Sverigetopplistan)	10
UK Singles (Official Charts)	18
US Billboard Hot 100	13
US Cash Box	11
US Record World	9

=== Year-end charts ===
Chart (1978)	Rank
Canada Top Singles (RPM)	94
US Billboard	94
US Cash Box	91

== Certifications ==
Region	Certification	Certified units/sales
Canada	—	75,000
United Kingdom (BPI)	Silver	200,000^{‡}
United States (RIAA)	Gold	500,000^{‡}
^{‡} Sales+streaming figures based on certification alone.

== Jeff Lynne solo version ==
Jeff Lynne re-recorded the song in his home studio. It was released in a compilation album with other re-recorded ELO songs, under the ELO name.
