= Electric Light Orchestra =

English rock band

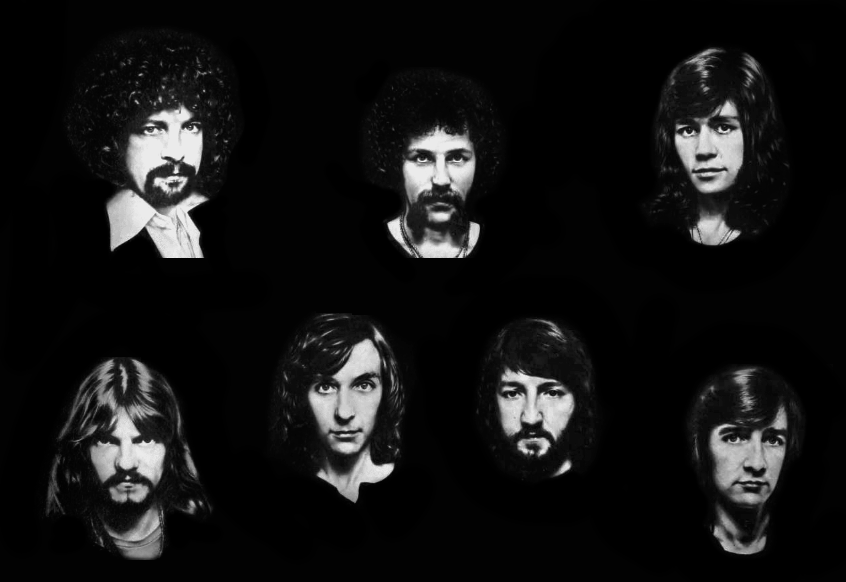
- ELO in 1977. Top row left to right: Jeff Lynne, Kelly Groucutt, Bev Bevan. Bottom row left to right: Hugh McDowell, Richard Tandy, Mik Kaminski, Melvyn Gale

Background information
- Also known as: ELO; Jeff Lynne's ELO (2014–2025)
- Origin: Birmingham, England
- Genres: Progressive pop; progressive rock; orchestral pop; art rock
- Years active: 1970–1986; 2000–2001; 2014–present
- Labels: Harvest; Warner Bros.; United Artists; Jet; Columbia; Epic; Sony; MCA; RCA
- Spinoffs: ELO Part II; The Orchestra; Wizzard
- Spinoff of: The Move; The Idle Race
- Members: Jeff Lynne
- Past members: Bev Bevan; Roy Wood; Rick Price; Bill Hunt; Steve Woolam; Richard Tandy; Andy Craig; Hugh McDowell; Wilfred Gibson; Mike Edwards; Colin Walker; Trevor Smith; Glenn Hughes; Mike de Albuquerque; Mik Kaminski; Kelly Groucutt; Melvyn Gale
- Website: jefflynneselo.com

Electric Light Orchestra (ELO) are an English rock band formed in Birmingham in 1970 by multi-instrumentalists Jeff Lynne and Roy Wood and drummer Bev Bevan. Their music is characterised by a fusion of pop and classical arrangements with futuristic iconography. After Wood's departure in 1972, Lynne became the band's sole leader, co-arranging and producing every album while writing nearly all of their original material. During their first run from 1970 to 1986, Lynne and Bevan were the group's only consistent members.

The group's name is a pun that references both electric light and "light orchestral music", a popular style featured on the BBC Light Programme between the 1940s and 1960s. ELO was formed out of Lynne's and Wood's desire to create modern rock and pop songs with electric instruments and classical influences. It derived as an offshoot of Wood's previous band, the Move, of which Lynne and Bevan were also members. During the 1970s and 1980s, ELO released a string of top 10 albums and singles, including the band's most commercially successful album, the double album Out of the Blue (1977). Two ELO albums reached the top of the British charts: the disco-inspired Discovery (1979) and the science-fiction-themed concept album Time (1981).

In 1986 Lynne lost interest in the band and disbanded the group. Bevan responded by forming his own band, ELO Part II, in 1989, which came to contain several of his former ELO bandmates by the early 1990s. Part II later evolved into The Orchestra after Bevan's departure in 1999. Following a brief reunion from 2000 to 2001 under Lynne's leadership, ELO once again went inactive until 2014, when Lynne re-formed the band with longtime member Richard Tandy (who had joined in 1971 and stayed until the initial 1986 split) as Jeff Lynne's ELO. Tandy died in May 2024, leaving Lynne as the sole member. In 2024 ELO embarked on their final tour, which had been announced four years prior to Tandy's death, but was delayed by the COVID-19 pandemic.

During ELO's original 13-year period of active recording and touring, they sold over 50 million records worldwide. They collected 19 CRIA, 21 RIAA, and 38 BPI awards. From 1972 to 1986 ELO accumulated 27 Top 40 songs on the UK Singles Chart, and fifteen Top 20 songs on the US Billboard Hot 100. The band also holds the record for having the most Billboard Hot 100 Top 40 hits (20) without a number one. (Note: The band did reach No. 1 on the Radio & Records chart with "Shine a Little Love" in 1979.) Four key members of ELO (Wood, Lynne, Bevan, and Tandy) were inducted into the Rock and Roll Hall of Fame in 2017.

== History ==
=== 1970–1973: Formation and early albums ===
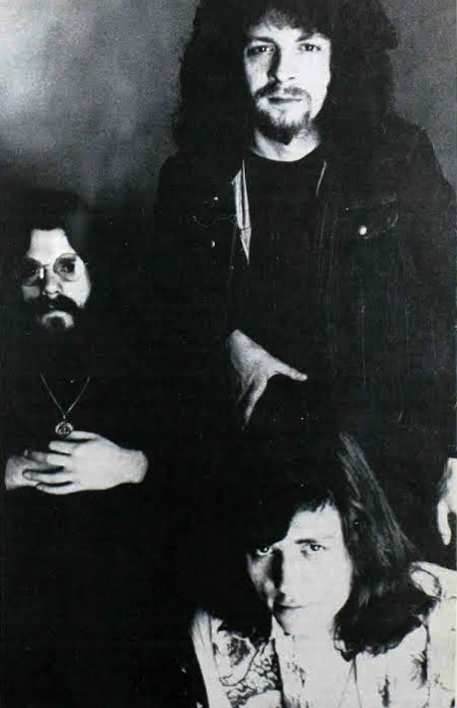
The Move/Electric Light Orchestra in 1972

In 1968 Roy Wood—guitarist, vocalist and songwriter of the Move—had an idea to form a new band that would use violins, cellos, string basses, horns and woodwinds to give their music a classical sound, allowing rock music to "pick up where the Beatles left off" in a new direction. The orchestral instruments would be the main focus, rather than the guitars. Jeff Lynne, frontman of fellow Birmingham group the Idle Race, was excited by the concept. When Trevor Burton left the Move in February 1969, Lynne was asked by Wood to join, only to say no, as he was still focused on finding success with his band. But in January 1970, when Carl Wayne quit the band, Lynne accepted Wood's second invitation to join, on the condition that they focus their energy on the new project.

On 12 July 1970, when Wood added cellos to a Lynne-penned song intended to be a Move B-side, the new concept became a reality and "10538 Overture" became the first Electric Light Orchestra song. The original plan was to end the Move following the release of the Looking On album at the end of 1970, crossing over to the new unit in the new year. But to help finance the fledgling band, one further Move album, Message from the Country, was recorded during the lengthy ELO recordings and released in mid-1971. The resulting debut album, The Electric Light Orchestra, was released in December 1971. Only the trio of Wood, Lynne and Bevan played on all songs, with Bill Hunt supplying the French Horn parts and Steve Woolam playing violin. It was released in the United States in March 1972 as No Answer. The name was chosen after a U.S. record company secretary had tried to ring the UK company to get the name of the album. They were unavailable so she left a note reading "No answer". "10538 Overture" became a UK top-ten hit. With both bands' albums in the stores simultaneously, the Move and ELO both appeared on television during this period.

ELO's debut concert took place on 16 April 1972 at the Greyhound Pub in Croydon, Surrey, with a line-up of Wood, Lynne, Bevan, Bill Hunt (keyboards/French horn), Andy Craig (cello), Mike Edwards (cello), Wilfred Gibson (violin), Hugh McDowell (cello) and Richard Tandy (bass). However, this line-up did not last for long. First Craig departed, and then Wood, during the recordings for the band's second LP. Taking Hunt and McDowell with him, Wood left the band to form Wizzard. Both Wood and Lynne later cited problems with their manager, Don Arden, who Wood felt failed in his role, and an unsatisfactory tour of Italy. However, Arden would manage Wizzard (and continue to manage ELO as well), despite Wood's negative comments towards Arden. Despite predictions from the music press that the band would fold without Wood, who had been the driving force behind the creation of ELO, Lynne stepped up to lead the band, with Bevan, Edwards, Gibson and Tandy (who had switched from bass to keyboards to replace Hunt) remaining from the previous line-up, and new recruits Mike de Albuquerque and Colin Walker joining the band on bass and cello, respectively.

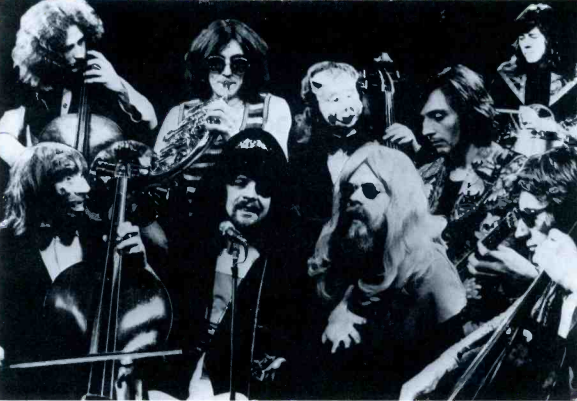
ELO in 1972. Top row left to right: Wilfred Gibson, Bill Hunt, Phil Copestake (roadie), Richard Tandy, Bev Bevan. Bottom row left to right: Hugh McDowell, Jeff Lynne, Roy Wood, Andy Craig

The new line-up performed at the 1972 Reading Festival on 12 August 1972. Barcus Berry instrument pick-ups, now sported by the band's string trio, allowed them to have proper amplification on stage for their instruments, which had previously been all but drowned out by the electrified instruments. The band released their second album, ELO 2, in early 1973, which produced their second UK top 10 and their first US chart single, an elaborate version of the Chuck Berry classic "Roll Over Beethoven" (which also incorporated the first 2 or 3 lines from the first movement of Beethoven's own Fifth Symphony). ELO also made their first appearance on American Bandstand.

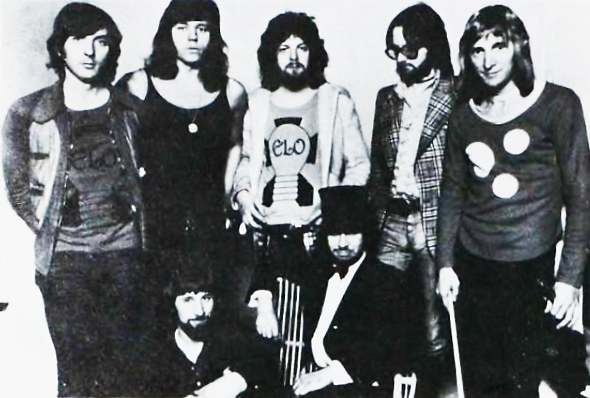
August 1972 - May 1973 lineup of ELO. Top row left to right: Richard Tandy, Bev Bevan, Jeff Lynne, Mike de Albuquerque, Wilfred Gibson. Bottom row left to right: Colin Walker, Mike Edwards.

During the recording of the third album, Gibson left after a dispute over money, Mik Kaminski joined as violinist, and Walker left because touring was keeping him away from his family too much. Remaining cellist Edwards finished the cello parts for the album. The resulting album, On the Third Day, was released in late 1973, with the American version featuring the single "Showdown". After leaving Wizzard, Hugh McDowell returned as the group's second cellist, also in late 1973, in time to appear on the On the Third Day cover in some regions, despite not having played on the album.

=== 1974–1982: Global success and concept albums ===
For the band's fourth album, Eldorado, a concept album about a daydreamer, Lynne stopped multi-tracking strings and hired Louis Clark as string arranger with an orchestra and choir. ELO's string players still continued to perform on recordings, however. The first single off the album, "Can't Get It Out of My Head", became their first US top 10 hit, and Eldorado, A Symphony became ELO's first gold album. Mike de Albuquerque departed the band during the recording sessions as he wished to spend more time with his family, and consequently much of the bass on the album was performed by Lynne.

Following the release of Eldorado, Kelly Groucutt was recruited as a bassist and secondary vocalist and in early 1975, Melvyn Gale replaced Edwards on cello. The line-up stabilised as the band took to a decidedly more accessible sound. ELO had become successful in the US at this point and the group was a star attraction on the stadium and arena circuit, and appeared on The Midnight Special more than any other band in that show's history with four appearances (in 1973, 1975, 1976, and 1977).

Face the Music was released in 1975, producing the hit singles "Evil Woman", their third UK top 10, and "Strange Magic". The opening instrumental "Fire on High", with its mix of strings and acoustic guitars, saw heavy exposure as the theme music for the American television programme CBS Sports Spectacular in the mid-1970s. The group toured extensively from 3 February to 13 April 1976, playing 68 shows in 76 days in the US.

Their sixth album, the platinum-selling A New World Record, became their first UK top 10 album when it was released in 1976. It contained the hit singles "Livin' Thing", "Telephone Line", "Rockaria!" and "Do Ya", the last a re-recording of the Move's final single. The band toured in support in the US only from September 1976 to April 1977 with a break in December, then an American Music Awards show appearance on 31 January 1977, plus a one-off gig in San Diego in August 1977.

A New World Record was followed by a multi-platinum-selling album, the double LP Out of the Blue, in 1977. Out of the Blue featured the singles "Turn to Stone", "Sweet Talkin' Woman", "Mr. Blue Sky", and "Wild West Hero", each becoming a hit in the United Kingdom. The band then set out on a nine-month, 92-date world tour, with an enormous set and a hugely expensive spaceship stage with fog machines and a laser display. In the United States the concerts were billed as The Big Night and were their largest to date, with 62,000 people seeing them at Cleveland Stadium. The Big Night became the highest-grossing live concert tour in music history up to that point (1978). The band played at London's Wembley Arena for eight straight sold-out nights during the tour, another record at the time. During an Australian tour in early 1978, Electric Light Orchestra were presented with 9 platinum awards for the albums Out of the Blue and A New World Record.

In 1979, the multi-platinum album Discovery was released, reaching number one on the UK Albums Chart. Although the biggest hit on the album (also ELO's biggest hit overall) was the rock song "Don't Bring Me Down", the album was noted for its heavy disco influence. Discovery also produced the hits "Shine a Little Love" (their only No. 1 hit on a US singles chart---Radio & Records (R&R)), "Last Train to London", "Confusion", and "The Diary of Horace Wimp". Another song, "Midnight Blue", was released as a single in southeast Asia. The band recorded promotional videos for all the songs on the album.

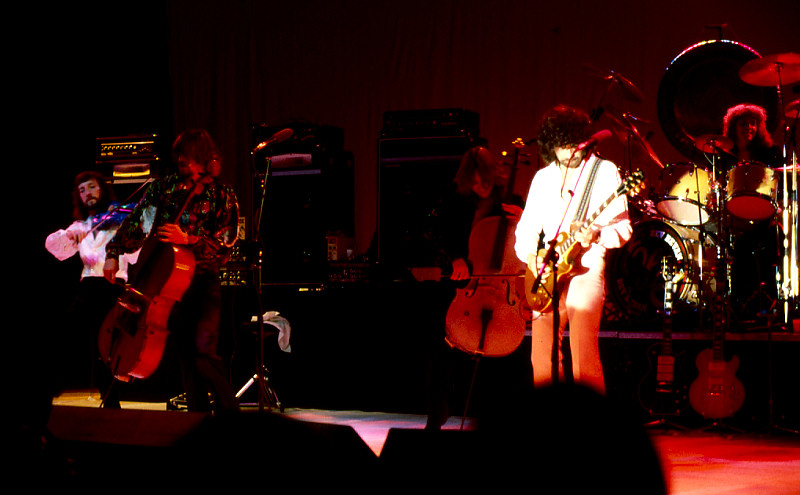
ELO performing in Oslo, Norway, in 1978

By the end of 1979, ELO had reached the peak of their stardom, selling millions of albums and singles, and even inspiring a parody/tribute song on the Randy Newman album Born Again, titled "The Story of a Rock and Roll Band". During 1979, Jeff Lynne also turned down an invitation for ELO to headline the August 1979 Knebworth Festival concerts. That allowed Led Zeppelin to headline instead.

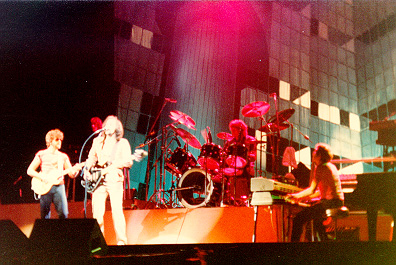
ELO performing live during their 1981 Time Tour. From left: Jeff Lynne, Louis Clark (obscured), Kelly Groucutt, Bev Bevan, and Richard Tandy

In January 1980, Hugh McDowell, Melvyn Gale, and Mik Kaminski were fired, as Jeff Lynne sought to take the band in a more modern direction. Later that year, Lynne was asked to write for the soundtrack of the musical film Xanadu and provided half of the songs, with the other half written by John Farrar and performed by the film's star Olivia Newton-John. The film performed poorly at the box office, but the soundtrack did exceptionally well, eventually going double platinum. The album spawned hit singles from both Newton-John ("Magic", a No. 1 hit in the United States, and "Suddenly" with Cliff Richard) and ELO ("I'm Alive", which went gold, "All Over the World" and "Don't Walk Away"). The title track, performed by both Newton-John and ELO, is ELO's only song to top the UK singles chart. More than a quarter of a century later, Xanadu, a Broadway musical based on the film, opened on 10 July 2007 at the Helen Hayes Theatre to uniformly good reviews. It received four Tony Award nominations. The musical received its UK premiere in London in October 2015.

"Twilight" from Time (1981)
The album Time (1981) represented a shift toward more electronic sounds.

In 1981 ELO's sound changed again with the science fiction concept album Time, a throwback to earlier, more progressive rock albums like Eldorado. With the string section now departed, synthesisers took a dominating role, as was the trend in the larger music scene of the time; although studio strings were present on some of the tracks conducted by Rainer Pietsch, the overall soundscape had a more electronic feel in keeping with the futuristic nature of the album. Time topped the UK charts for two weeks and was the last ELO studio album to be certified platinum in the United Kingdom until Alone in the Universe in 2015. Singles from the album included "Hold On Tight", "Twilight", "The Way Life's Meant to Be", "Here Is the News" and "Ticket to the Moon". However, the release of the single for "Rain Is Falling" in 1982 was the band's first single in the US to fail to reach the Billboard Top 200 since 1975, and the release of "The Way Life's Meant to Be" similarly was their first single in the UK to fail to chart since 1976. The band embarked on their last world tour to promote the LP. For the tour, Kaminski returned to the line-up on violin, whilst Louis Clark (synthesizers) and Dave Morgan (guitar, keyboards, synthesizers, vocals) also joined the on stage line-up. Clark had previously handled string arrangements for the band.

=== 1983–1986: Secret Messages, Balance of Power, disbanding ===
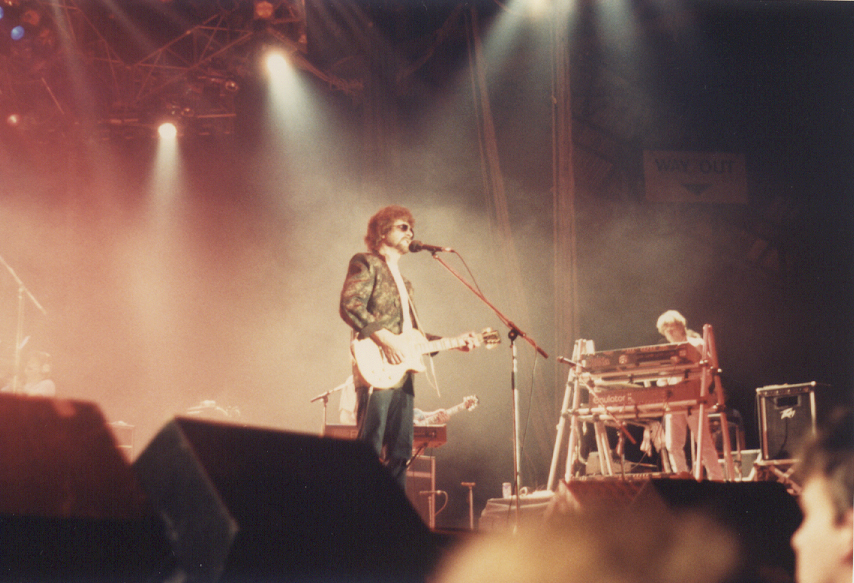
ELO performing in 1986 (Jeff Lynne and Richard Tandy pictured)

Jeff Lynne wanted to follow Time with a double album, but CBS blocked his plan on the grounds that a double vinyl album would be too expensive and not sell as well as a single record, so as a result, the new album was edited down to a single disc and released as Secret Messages in 1983; many of the out-takes were later released on Afterglow or as B-sides of singles. The album was a hit in the UK reaching the top 5, but its release was undermined by a string of bad news that there would be no tour to promote the LP. Lynne, discouraged by the dwindling crowds on the Time tour, CBS's order to cut Secret Messages down to one disc, and his falling out with manager Don Arden, decided to end ELO in late 1983. At this point, Lynne appointed his accountant and tour manager Craig Fruin as his new manager (a position Fruin still holds as of 2026).

Drummer Bevan moved on to play drums for Black Sabbath, and bassist Groucutt, unhappy with no touring income that year, sued Lynne and Jet Records in November 1983, eventually resulting in a settlement for the sum of £300,000 (equivalent to £1,004,913 in 2025). While Secret Messages debuted at number four in the United Kingdom, it subsequently performed poorly in the charts, with a lack of hit singles (though "Rock 'n' Roll Is King" was a sizeable hit in UK, the US and Australia) and a lukewarm media response. That same year, Lynne moved into production work: having already produced two tracks for the Dave Edmunds album Information, he would produce six cuts for his next, Riff Raff in 1984, and one cut on the Everly Brothers reunion album EB 84. He also composed a track for former ABBA member Agnetha Fältskog's 1985 album Eyes of a Woman.

Lynne and Tandy recorded tracks for the 1984 Electric Dreams soundtrack under Lynne's name; however, Lynne was contractually obliged to make one more ELO album. So Lynne, Bevan and Tandy returned to the studio in 1984 and 1985 as a three-piece (with Christian Schneider playing saxophone on some tracks and Lynne again doubling on bass in addition to his usual guitar in the absence of an official bass player) to record Balance of Power, released early in 1986 after some delays. Though the single "Calling America" placed in the Top 30 in the United Kingdom (number 28) and Top 20 in the States, subsequent singles failed to chart. The album lacked actual classical strings, which were replaced once again by synthesizers, played by Tandy and Lynne. However, despite being a 3-piece, much of the album was made by Lynne alone, with Tandy and Bevan giving their additions later.

The band was then rejoined by Kaminski, Clark and Morgan, adding Martin Smith on bass guitar, and proceeded to perform a small number of live ELO performances in 1986, including shows in England and Germany along with US appearances on American Bandstand, Solid Gold, then at Disneyland that summer. ELO performed at the Heart Beat 86 charity concert organised by Bevan in the band's hometown of Birmingham on 15 March 1986; a hint of Lynne's future was seen when George Harrison appeared onstage during the encore, joining in the all-star jam of "Johnny B. Goode". ELO's last performance for several years occurred on 13 July 1986 in Stuttgart, Germany, opening for Rod Stewart. With Lynne no longer contractually obliged to further performances, ELO effectively disbanded after that show, but there was no announcement made of it for the next two years, during which George Harrison's Lynne-produced album Cloud Nine and the pair's follow-up (with Roy Orbison, Bob Dylan and Tom Petty as Traveling Wilburys) Traveling Wilburys Vol. 1 were released.

=== 1989–1999: ELO Part II ===
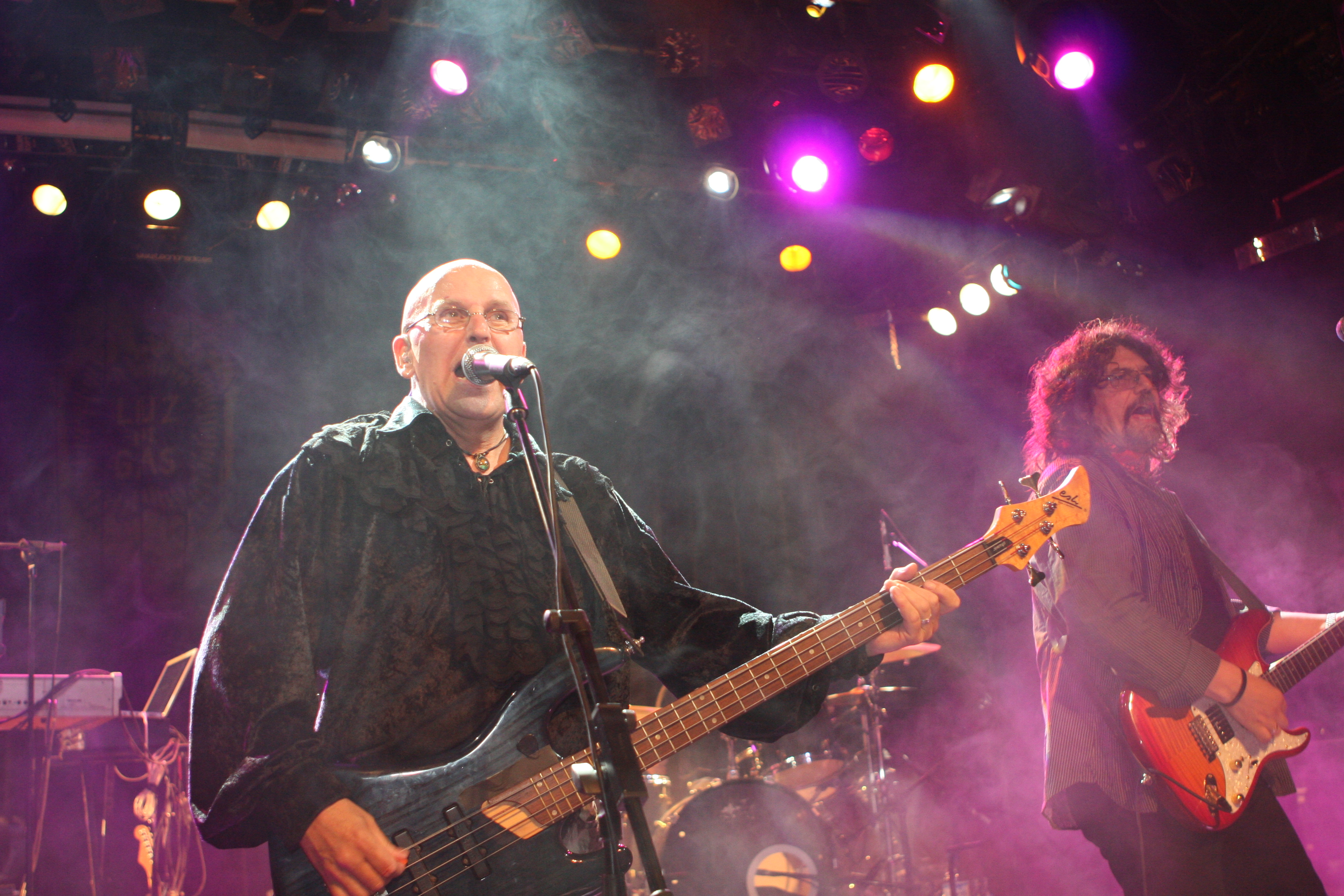
ELO Part II in concert

Bev Bevan (under an agreement with Lynne, who co-owned the ELO name with him) continued on in 1989 as ELO Part II, initially with no other former ELO members, but with ELO's main orchestra conductor, Louis Clark. Bevan also recruited Eric Troyer, Pete Haycock, and Neil Lockwood. ELO Part II released their debut album, Electric Light Orchestra Part Two, in May 1991, featuring songs written primarily by Troyer and Haycock. Mik Kaminski, Kelly Groucutt and Hugh McDowell, at the time working in a group called OrKestra, joined the group for their first tour in 1991. While McDowell did not stay long-term, Groucutt and Kaminski became fully fledged members by 1993. Bevan retired from the band in 1999, while the remaining band members continued, changing the group's name to The Orchestra.

=== 2000–2001: Reformation ===
Lynne's comeback with ELO began in 2000 with the release of a retrospective box set, Flashback, containing three CDs of remastered tracks and a handful of out-takes and unfinished works, most notably a new version of ELO's only UK number one hit, "Xanadu". In 2001 Zoom, ELO's first album of new material since 1986, was released. Though billed and marketed as an ELO album, the only returning member other than Lynne was Tandy, who performed on one track. Guest musicians included former Beatles Ringo Starr and George Harrison. Upon completion of the album, Lynne re-formed the band with completely new members, including his then-girlfriend Rosie Vela (who had released her own album, Zazu, in 1986) and announced that ELO would tour again. Tandy rejoined the band a short time afterwards for two television live performances: VH1 Storytellers and a PBS concert shot at CBS Television City, later titled Zoom Tour Live and released on DVD. Besides Lynne, Tandy and Vela, the new live ELO line-up included Gregg Bissonette (drums, backing vocals), Matt Bissonette (bass guitar, backing vocals), Marc Mann (guitars, keyboards, backing vocals), Peggy Baldwin (cello), and Sarah O'Brien (cello). However, the planned tour was cancelled, reportedly due to poor ticket sales.

=== 2001–2013: Non-performing work, reissues and miniature reunions ===
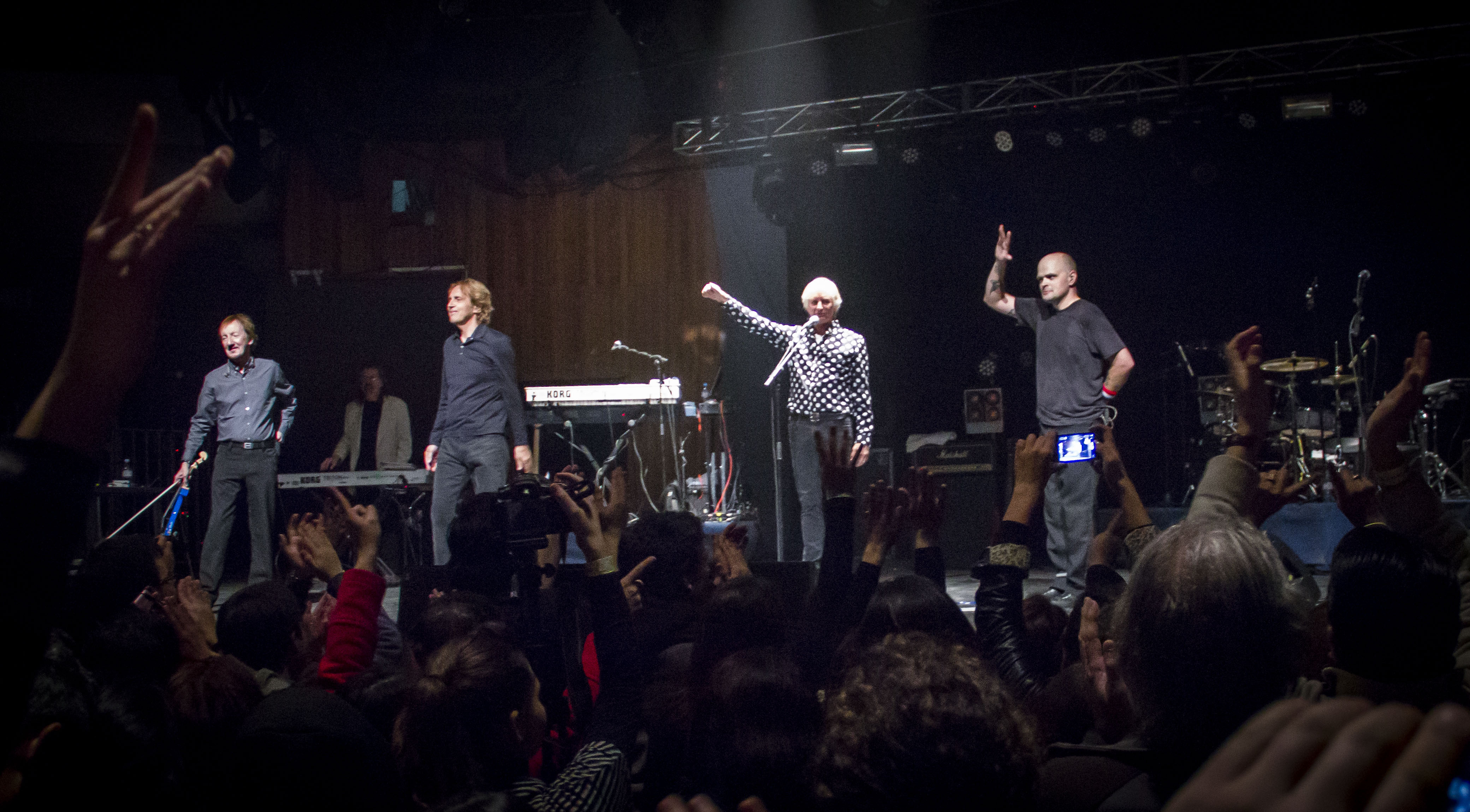
The Orchestra during a performance in 2013

From 2001 to 2007, Harvest and Epic/Legacy reissued ELO's back catalogue. Included amongst the remastered album tracks were unreleased songs and outtakes, including two new singles. The first was "Surrender", which registered on the lower end of the UK Singles Chart at number 81, some 30 years after it was written in 1976. The other single was "Latitude 88 North".

In August 2010, Eagle Rock Entertainment released Live – The Early Years in the UK as a DVD compilation that included Fusion – Live in London (1976) along with previously unreleased live performances at Brunel University (1973) and on the German TV show Rockpalast (1974). The Essential Electric Light Orchestra artwork was re-jigged to feature two different covers. The US and Australian releases shared one design, while the rest of the world featured the other for a new double album release in October 2011.

Mr. Blue Sky: The Very Best of Electric Light Orchestra was released on 8 October 2012. It is an album of re-recordings of ELO's greatest hits, performed by Lynne exclusively, along with a new song titled "Point of No Return". Released to coincide with Lynne's second solo album, Long Wave, these new albums contained advertisement cards, announcing the re-release of expanded and remastered versions of both the 2001 album Zoom and Lynne's debut solo album, Armchair Theatre, originally released in 1990. Both albums were re-released in April 2013 with various bonus tracks. Also released was the live album Electric Light Orchestra Live, showcasing songs from the Zoom tour. All three releases also featured new studio recordings as bonus tracks.

Though not billed as Electric Light Orchestra (or the abbreviated ELO), in 2012, Lynne and Tandy reunited, largely under Lynne's name, to perform stripped-down acoustic versions of their ELO hits for the BBC television special Jeff Lynne Acoustic: Live from Bungalow Palace. Lynne and Tandy reunited again on 12 November 2013 to perform, under the name Jeff Lynne and Friends, "Livin' Thing" and "Mr. Blue Sky" at the Children in Need Rocks concert at Hammersmith Eventim Apollo, London. The backing orchestra was the BBC Concert Orchestra, with Chereene Allen on lead violin.

=== 2014–2025: Jeff Lynne's ELO ===
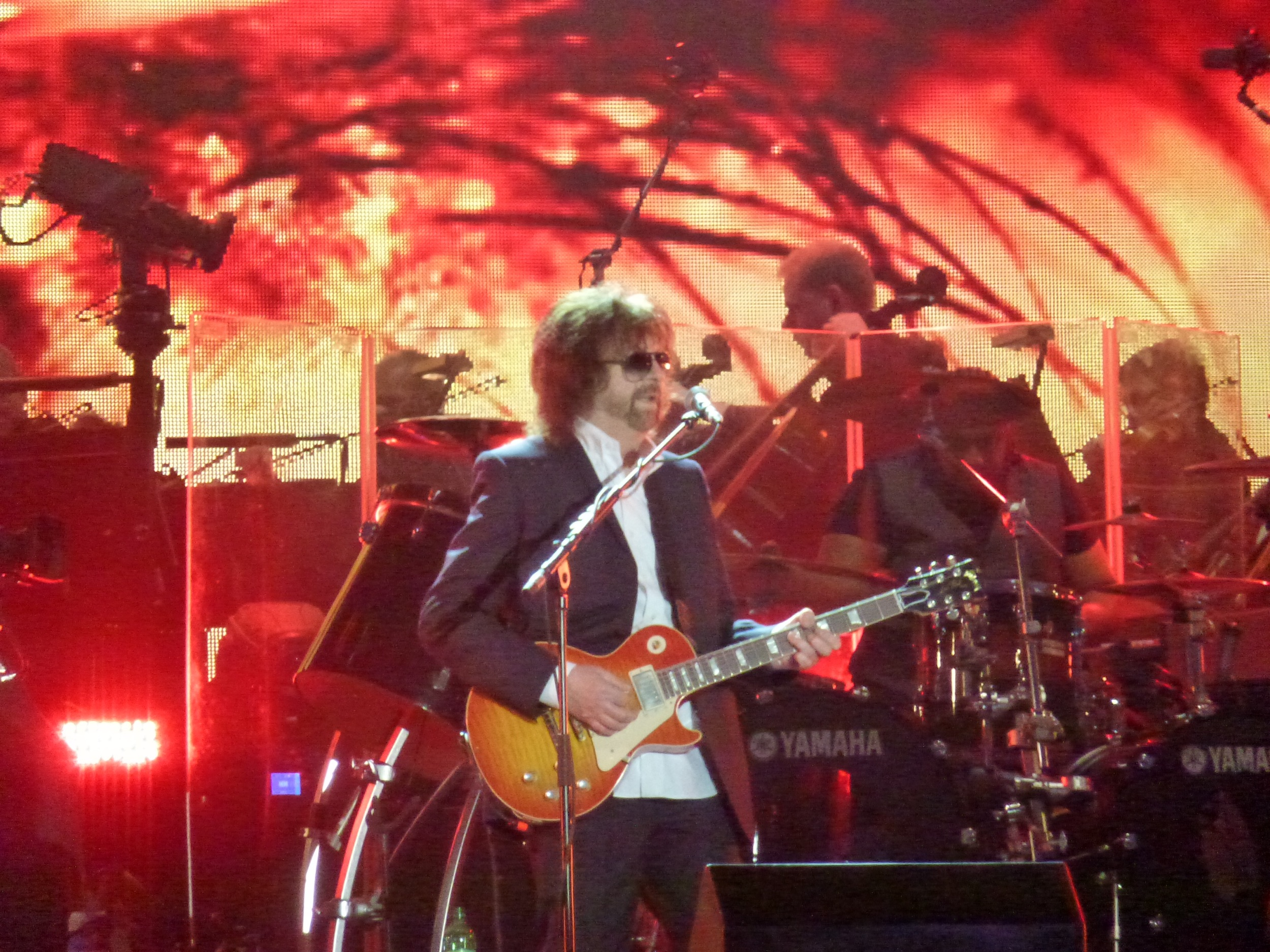
Jeff Lynne's ELO performing at Hyde Park, September 2014

The success of the Children in Need performance was followed by support from BBC Radio 2 DJ Chris Evans, who had Lynne as his on-air guest and asked his listeners if they wanted to see ELO perform. The 50,000 tickets for the resulting BBC Radio 2's "Festival in a Day" in Hyde Park on 14 September 2014 sold out in 15 minutes. Billed as "Jeff Lynne's ELO", Lynne and Richard Tandy were backed by the Take That/Gary Barlow band from the Children in Need concert, led by Mike Stevens and the BBC Concert Orchestra. Lynne chose to use the name as a response to ELO offshoots ELO Part II and The Orchestra. Chereene Allen was again the lead violinist for the band. The development of modern digital processing added a smoother finish to the work, which led Lynne to reconsider his preference for studio work, hinting at a UK tour in 2015. On 8 February 2015, Jeff Lynne's ELO played at the Grammy Awards for the first time. They performed a medley of "Evil Woman" and "Mr. Blue Sky" with Ed Sheeran, who introduced them as "A man and a band who I love".

On 10 September 2015, it was announced that a new ELO album would be released. The album was to be under the moniker of Jeff Lynne's ELO, with the band signed to Columbia Records. Alone in the Universe was released on 13 November 2015. The album was ELO's first album of new material since 2001's Zoom. The first track, and single, "When I Was a Boy" was made available for streaming on the same day and a music video for the song was also released. A small promotional tour followed the album's release, which saw Jeff Lynne's ELO perform a full concert for BBC Radio 2 along with their first two shows in the United States in 30 years, both which sold out very quickly. Jeff Lynne's ELO also made US television appearances on The Tonight Show Starring Jimmy Fallon, Jimmy Kimmel Live and CBS This Morning. A 19-date European tour was announced for 2016, with the band playing the Pyramid Stage at Glastonbury Festival on 26 June 2016.

In 2017 they played their "Alone in the Universe" tour. That same year, on 7 April, they played at the Rock and Roll Hall of Fame as they were inducted during the 32nd Annual Induction Ceremony.

The band continued to tour in 2018 in North America and Europe. A video was created for the City of Birmingham which used the original recording of "Mr. Blue Sky" as its music; this was played at the Gold Coast 2018 Commonwealth Games Closing Ceremony during the handover presentation of Birmingham 2022. On 3 August 2018, Secret Messages was reissued "as originally conceived" as a double album. It included several cut tracks, such as the CD exclusive bonus track "Time After Time", B-side exclusives "Buildings Have Eyes" and "After All", the Afterglow exclusives "Mandalay" and "Hello My Old Friend", and the 2001 reissue exclusives "Endless Lies" and "No Way Out". On 22 October 2018, Lynne announced that Jeff Lynne's ELO would embark on a 2019 North American tour from June to August 2019.

ELO released their 14th album, From Out of Nowhere, on 1 November 2019. While a tour from the album was announced to begin in October 2020, the official Jeff Lynne's ELO Twitter page later announced that the tour was cancelled due to the COVID-19 pandemic.

On 18 March 2024, ELO announced the Over And Out Tour, a final tour of North America that would span August to October 2024. Tandy died in 2024, at the age of 76. Lynne announced his death on social media on 1 May 2024, and said Tandy had been "a remarkable musician and friend." On 21 October 2024, it was announced that ELO would perform a farewell concert at the BST event in Hyde Park, London, on 13 July 2025. That same month, it was reiterated that Lynne was "unambiguous" about the tour being the band's last. In July 2025, during his Over and Out tour, Lynne suffered a hand injury while travelling in a taxi in London. The last two shows on the UK tour (which were to be the band's last ever) were cancelled due to Lynne's health, with no plans to reschedule. On 12 July, the day before the Hyde Park show was to take place, it was announced to have been cancelled due to Lynne having a "systemic infection" and would not be rescheduled.

== Legacy and influence ==
According to music journalist Simon Price, ELO is

arguably the most uncool, even defiantly anti-cool, of the lot and have been the slowest to be rehabilitated since ... They've been sampled by dozens upon dozens of acts, from Company Flow to the Pussycat Dolls, if you go looking. Every now and then in my journalistic career, it's been possible to coax a contemporary band to admit to an ELO influence; the Flaming Lips and Super Furry Animals being two examples. But the band in whom I perceive the greatest amount of ELO DNA are outside the rock genre altogether: Daft Punk."

In November 2016, Jeff Lynne's ELO won Band of the Year at the Classic Rock Roll of Honour Awards. In October 2016, ELO were nominated for the 2017 class of the Rock and Roll Hall of Fame for the first time. It was the first time the Hall had announced in advance the members of bands who would be inducted; the members of ELO listed were Jeff Lynne, Roy Wood, Bev Bevan and Richard Tandy. On 20 December 2016, it was announced ELO had been elected to the Rock and Roll Hall of Fame Class of 2017.

== Members ==
=== Current ===
- Jeff Lynne – lead and backing vocals, guitars (1970–1986, 2000–2001, 2014–2025), bass (1971, 1974, 1985–present; studio only), keyboards (1970–present; studio only), drums (2001–present; studio only)

=== Former ===
- Bev Bevan – drums, percussion, backing vocals (1970–1986)
- Roy Wood – lead and backing vocals, cello, oboe, guitar, bass, woodwinds (1970–1972)
- Rick Price – bass (1970)
- Bill Hunt – French horn, keyboard (1971–1972)
- Steve Woolam – violin (1971)
- Richard Tandy – piano, keyboards, synthesizer, guitar, backing vocals (1972–1986, 2000–2001, 2014–2024), bass (1972)
- Andy Craig – cello (1972)
- Hugh McDowell – cello (1972, 1973–1980)
- Wilfred Gibson – violin (1972–1973)
- Mike Edwards – cello (1972–1975)
- Colin Walker – cello (1972–1973)
- Trevor Smith – cello, sound engineer (1972)
- Glenn Hughes – bass, backing vocals (1972)
- Mike de Albuquerque – bass, backing vocals (1972–1974)
- Mik Kaminski – violin (1973–1980)
- Kelly Groucutt – bass, lead and backing vocals (1974–1983)
- Melvyn Gale – cello (1974–1980)

=== Recording timeline ===
Year	Album	Single	Lead vocals	Guitar	Bass	Keyboards	Violin	Cello	Woodwinds	Drums
1971	The Electric Light Orchestra		Jeff Lynne/Roy Wood			Jeff Lynne	Steve Woolam	Roy Wood	Bill Hunt/Roy Wood	Bev Bevan
1973	ELO 2		Jeff Lynne	Jeff Lynne/Richard Tandy	Roy Wood/Mike de Albuquerque	Richard Tandy/Jeff Lynne	Wilfred Gibson	Roy Wood/Hugh McDowell/Mike Edwards/Colin Walker	Bill Hunt	Bev Bevan
1973	On the Third Day		Jeff Lynne		Mike de Albuquerque	Richard Tandy	Wilfred Gibson/Mik Kaminski	Hugh McDowell/Mike Edwards/Colin Walker		Bev Bevan
1974	Eldorado		Jeff Lynne	Jeff Lynne/Richard Tandy	Mike de Albuquerque	Richard Tandy/Jeff Lynne	Mik Kaminski	Hugh McDowell/Mike Edwards		Bev Bevan
1975	Face the Music		Jeff Lynne		Kelly Groucutt	Richard Tandy	Mik Kaminski	Hugh McDowell/Melvyn Gale		Bev Bevan
1976	A New World Record		Jeff Lynne	Jeff Lynne/Richard Tandy	Kelly Groucutt	Richard Tandy/Jeff Lynne	Mik Kaminski	Hugh McDowell/Melvyn Gale		Bev Bevan
1977	Out of the Blue		Jeff Lynne	Jeff Lynne/Richard Tandy	Kelly Groucutt	Richard Tandy/Jeff Lynne	Mik Kaminski	Hugh McDowell/Melvyn Gale		Bev Bevan
1979	Discovery		Jeff Lynne	Jeff Lynne/Richard Tandy	Kelly Groucutt	Richard Tandy	Mik Kaminski	Hugh McDowell/Melvyn Gale		Bev Bevan
1980	Xanadu		Jeff Lynne		Kelly Groucutt	Richard Tandy/Jeff Lynne				Bev Bevan
1981	Time		Jeff Lynne	Jeff Lynne/Richard Tandy	Kelly Groucutt	Richard Tandy/Jeff Lynne				Bev Bevan
1983	Secret Messages		Jeff Lynne		Kelly Groucutt/Jeff Lynne	Richard Tandy/Jeff Lynne	Mik Kaminski			Bev Bevan

== Discography ==
Studio albums

- The Electric Light Orchestra (1971)
- ELO 2 (1973)
- On the Third Day (1973)
- Eldorado (1974)
- Face the Music (1975)
- A New World Record (1976)
- Out of the Blue (1977)
- Discovery (1979)
- Time (1981) (as ELO)
- Secret Messages (1983)
- Balance of Power (1986)
- Zoom (2001)
- Alone in the Universe (2015) (as Jeff Lynne's ELO)
- From Out of Nowhere (2019) (as Jeff Lynne's ELO)
