= List of Electric Light Orchestra members =

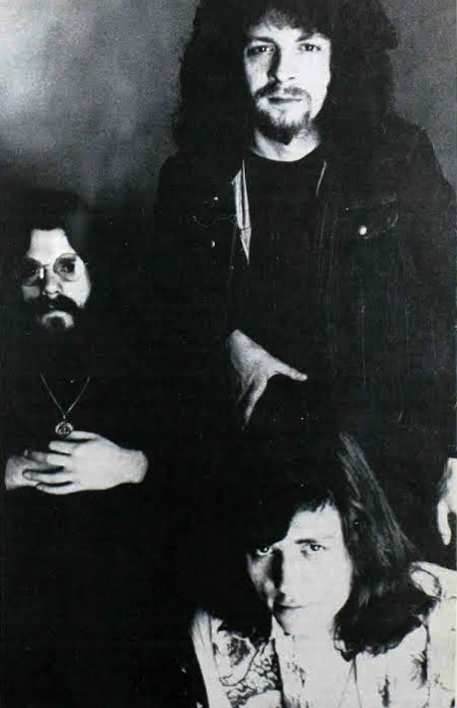
(left to right) Roy Wood, Jeff Lynne (top) and Bev Bevan (bottom)

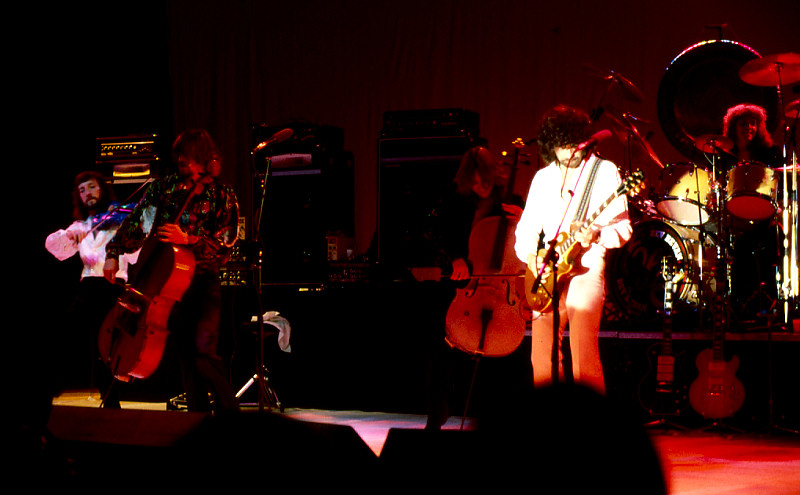
(left to right) Mik Kaminski, Hugh McDowell, Melvyn Gale, Jeff Lynne and Bev Bevan (Kelly Groucutt and Richard Tandy not shown)

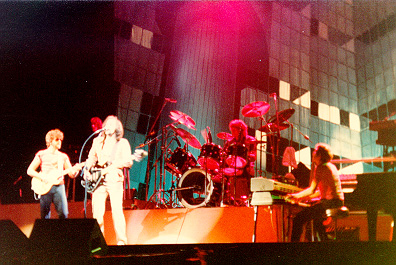
(left to right) Jeff Lynne, Louis Clark, Kelly Groucutt, Bev Bevan and Richard Tandy (Mik Kaminski and David Scott-Morgan not shown)

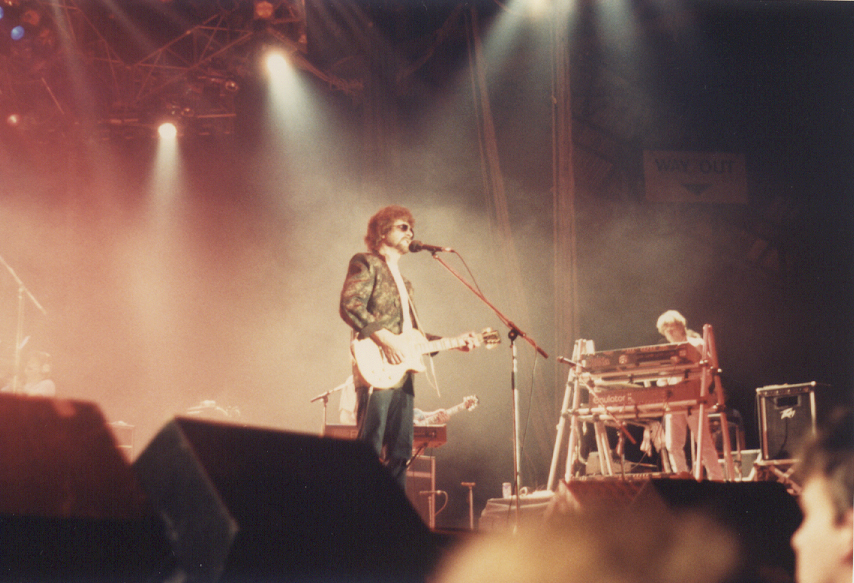
(left to right) Jeff Lynne, David Scott-Morgan (obscured) and Richard Tandy (Bev Bevan, Mik Kaminski, Martin Smith and Louis Clark not shown)

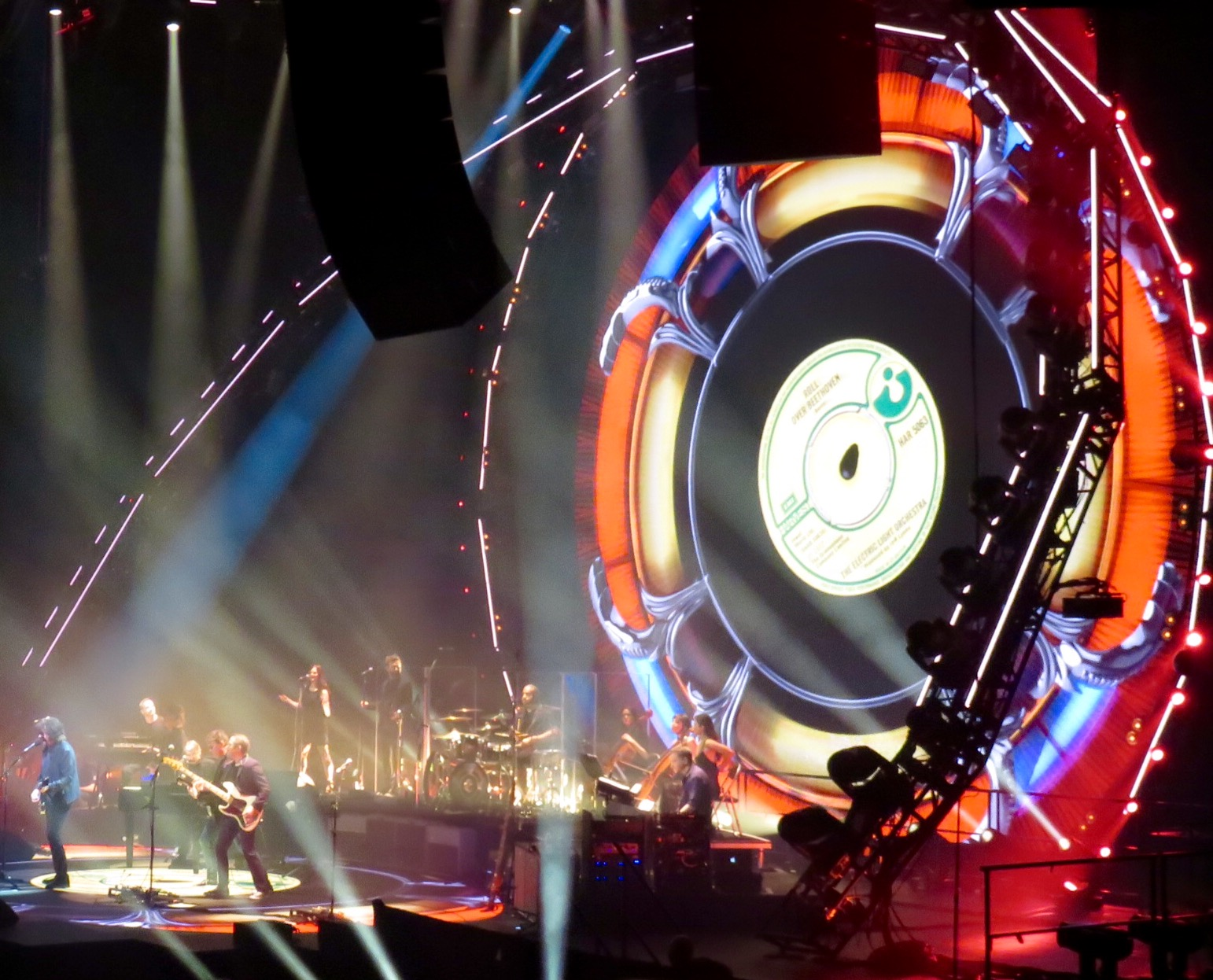
(left to right) Jeff Lynne, Jo Webb, Marcus Byrne, Mike Stevens, Lee Pomeroy, Melanie Lewis-McDonald, Iain Hornal, Donovan Hepburn, Amy Langley, Jess Cox, Bernie Smith and Rosie Langley (Milton McDonald not shown)

Five line-ups of ELO performing in 1973, 1978, 1981/1982, 1986, 2016

The Electric Light Orchestra (ELO) are an English rock band from Birmingham. Formed in 1971, the group's original lineup included songwriters/multi-instrumentalists Jeff Lynne and Roy Wood and drummer Bev Bevan. Currently Jeff Lynne is the only official member of the band. Under the moniker Jeff Lynne's ELO, he tours with additional musicians.

== History ==
=== 1968–1974 ===
In 1968, Roy Wood—guitarist, vocalist and songwriter of the Move—had an idea to form a new band that would use violins, cellos, string basses, horns and woodwinds to give their music a classical sound, allowing rock music to "pick up where the Beatles left off" in a new direction. The orchestral instruments would be the main focus, rather than the guitars. Jeff Lynne, frontman of fellow Birmingham group the Idle Race, was excited by the concept. When Trevor Burton left the Move in February 1969, Lynne was asked by Wood to join, only to say no, as he was still focused on finding success with his band. But in January 1970, when Carl Wayne quit the band, Lynne accepted Wood's second invitation to join, on the condition that they focus their energy on the new project.

On 12 July 1970, when Wood added multiple cellos to a Lynne-penned song intended to be a Move B-side, the new concept became a reality and "10538 Overture" became the first Electric Light Orchestra song. The original plan was to end The Move following the release of the Looking On album at the end of 1970, crossing over to the new unit in the new year. But to help finance the fledgling band, one further Move album, Message from the Country, was recorded during the lengthy ELO recordings and released in mid-1971. The resulting debut album The Electric Light Orchestra was released in December 1971. Only the trio of Wood, Lynne and Bevan played on all songs, with Bill Hunt supplying the French Horn parts and Steve Woolam playing violin.

ELO's debut concert took place on 16 April 1972 at the Greyhound Pub in Croydon, Surrey, with a line-up of Wood, Lynne, Bevan, Bill Hunt (keyboards/French horn), Andy Craig (cello), Mike Edwards (cello), Wilfred Gibson (violin), Hugh McDowell (cello), and Richard Tandy (bass). However, this line-up did not last for long. First Craig departed, and then Wood, during the recordings for the band's second LP. Taking Hunt and McDowell with him, Wood left the band to form Wizzard. Lynne stepped up to lead the band, with Bevan, Edwards, Gibson and Tandy (who had switched from bass to keyboards to replace Hunt) remaining from the previous line-up, and new recruits Glenn Hughes (soon replaced by Mike de Albuquerque) and Colin Walker joining the band on bass and cello, respectively.

During the recording of their third album, Gibson was let go after a dispute over money, Mik Kaminski joined as violinist, and Walker left. Remaining cellist Edwards finished the cello parts for the album. The resulting album, On the Third Day, was released in late 1973, with the American version featuring the popular single "Showdown". After leaving Wizzard, Hugh McDowell returned as the group's second cellist, also in late 1973, in time to appear on the On the Third Day cover in some regions, despite not having played on the album.

For the band's fourth album, Eldorado, a concept album about a daydreamer, Lynne stopped multi-tracking strings and hired Louis Clark as string arranger with an orchestra and choir. ELO's string players still continued to perform on recordings. Mike de Albuquerque departed the band during the recording sessions as he wished to spend more time with his family, and consequently much of the bass on the album was performed by Lynne.

=== 1974–1986 ===
Following the release of Eldorado, Kelly Groucutt was recruited as bassist and in early 1975, Melvyn Gale replaced Edwards on cello. The line-up stabilised as the band took to a decidedly more accessible sound. ELO had become successful in the US at this point and the group was a star attraction on the stadium and arena circuit, and appeared on The Midnight Special more than any other band in that show's history with four appearances (in 1973, 1975, 1976, and 1977).

In 1981, the string section now departed, synthesisers took a dominating role, as was the trend in the larger music scene of the time; although studio strings were present on some of the tracks conducted by Rainer Pietsch, the band embarked on their last world tour to promote the LP. For the tour, Kaminski returned to the live line-up on violin, whilst Louis Clark (synthesizers) and Dave Morgan (guitar, keyboards, synthesizers, vocals) also joined the on-stage lineup.

Drummer Bevan moved on to play drums for Black Sabbath and bassist Groucutt, unhappy with no touring income that year, decided to sue Lynne and Jet Records in November 1983, eventually resulting in a settlement for the sum of £300,000 (equivalent to £1,020,000 in 2025). While Secret Messages debuted at number four in the United Kingdom.

Lynne and Tandy went on to record tracks for the 1984 Electric Dreams soundtrack under Lynne's name; however, Lynne was contractually obliged to make one more ELO album. So, Lynne, Bevan and Tandy returned to the studio in 1984 and 1985 as a three-piece (with Christian Schneider playing saxophone on some tracks and Lynne again doubling on bass in addition to his usual guitar in the absence of an official bass player) to record Balance of Power, released early in 1986 after some delays. Though the single "Calling America" placed in the Top 30 in the United Kingdom (number 28) and Top 20 in the States, subsequent singles failed to chart. The album lacked actual classical strings, which were replaced once again by synthesizers, played by Tandy and Lynne. However, despite being a 3-piece, much of the album was made by Lynne alone, with Tandy and Bevan giving their additions later.

The band was then rejoined by Kaminski, Clark and Morgan, adding Martin Smith on bass guitar, and proceeded to perform a small number of live ELO performances in 1986, including shows in England and Germany along with US appearances on American Bandstand, Solid Gold, then at Disneyland that summer. ELO performed at the Heart Beat 86 charity concert organised by Bevan in the band's hometown of Birmingham on 15 March 1986.

=== 2001–present ===
Lynne's comeback with ELO began in 2000 with the release of a retrospective box set, Flashback, containing three CDs of remastered tracks and a handful of out-takes and unfinished works, most notably a new version of ELO's only UK number one hit "Xanadu". In 2001 Zoom, ELO's first album since 1986, was released. Though billed and marketed as an ELO album, the only returning member other than Lynne was Tandy, who performed on one track. Guest musicians included former Beatles Ringo Starr and George Harrison. Upon completion of the album, Lynne reformed the band with completely new members, including his then-girlfriend Rosie Vela (who had released her own album, Zazu, in 1986) and announced that ELO would tour again. Tandy rejoined the band a short time afterwards for two television live performances: VH1 Storytellers and a PBS concert shot at CBS Television City, later titled Zoom Tour Live and released on DVD. Besides Lynne, Tandy and Vela, the new live ELO lineup included Gregg Bissonette (drums, backing vocals), Matt Bissonette (bass guitar, backing vocals), Marc Mann (guitars, keyboards, backing vocals), Peggy Baldwin (cello), and Sarah O'Brien (cello). However, the planned tour was cancelled, reportedly due to poor ticket sales.

Lynne and Tandy reunited again on 12 November 2013 to perform, under the name Jeff Lynne and Friends, "Livin' Thing" and "Mr. Blue Sky" at the Children in Need Rocks concert at Hammersmith Eventim Apollo, London. The backing orchestra was the BBC Concert Orchestra, with Chereene Allen on lead violin.

The success of the Children in Need performance was followed by support from BBC Radio 2 DJ Chris Evans, who had Lynne as his on-air guest and asked his listeners if they wanted to see ELO perform. The 50,000 tickets for the resulting BBC Radio 2's "Festival in a Day" in Hyde Park on 14 September 2014 sold out in 15 minutes. Billed as "Jeff Lynne's ELO", Lynne and Tandy were backed by the Take That/Gary Barlow band from the Children in Need concert, led by Mike Stevens and the BBC Concert Orchestra. Lynne chose to use the name as a response to ELO offshoots ELO Part II and The Orchestra. Chereene Allen was again the lead violinist for the band. The development of modern digital processing added a smoother finish to the work, which led Lynne to reconsider his preference for studio work, hinting at a UK tour in 2015.

On 8 February 2015, Jeff Lynne's ELO played at the Grammy Awards for the first time. They performed a medley of "Evil Woman" and "Mr. Blue Sky" with Ed Sheeran, who introduced them as "A man and a band who I love".

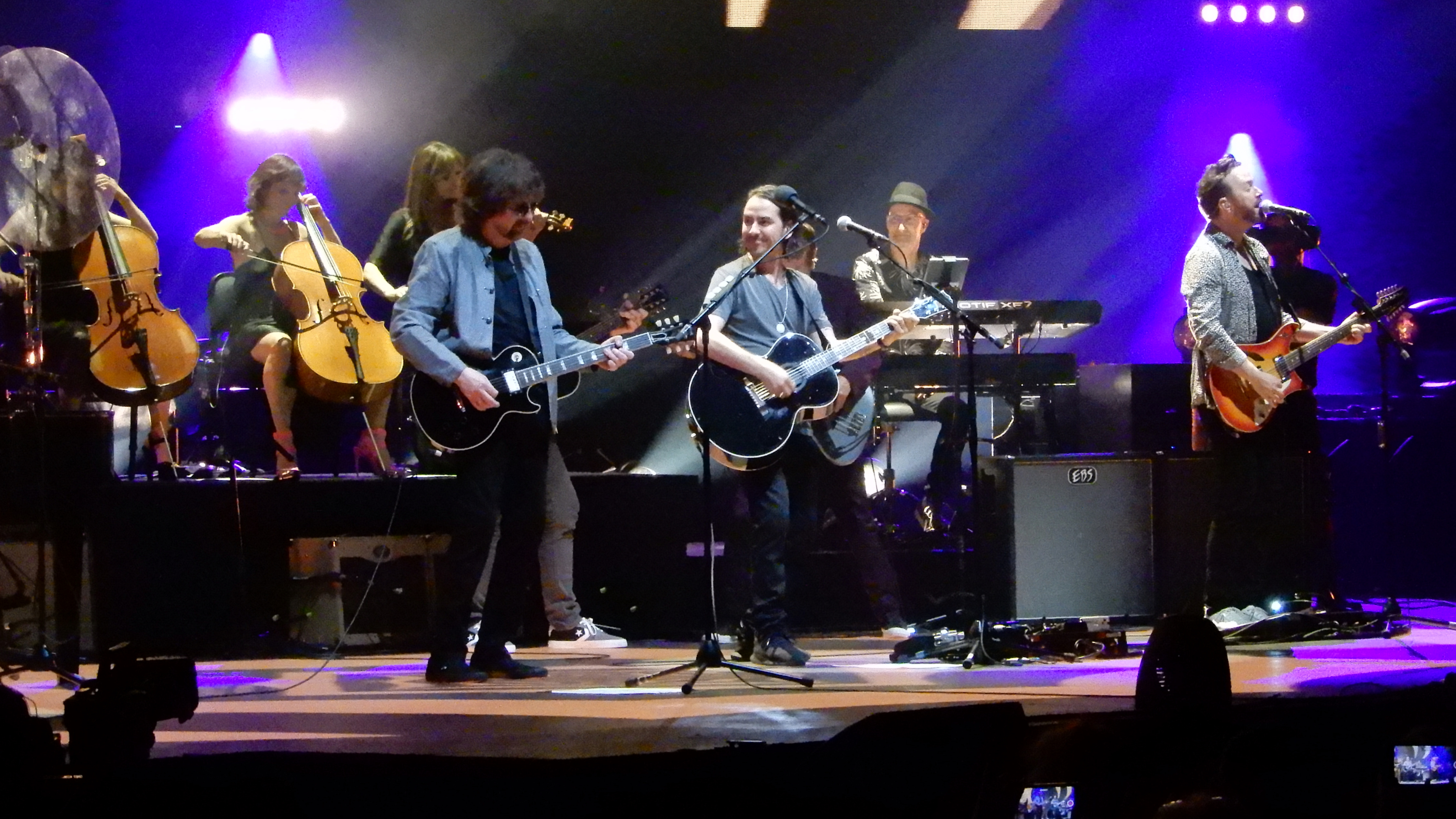
Jeff Lynne's ELO have toured since 2016

On 10 September 2015, it was announced that a new ELO album would be released. The album was to be under the moniker of Jeff Lynne's ELO, with the band signed to Columbia Records. Alone in the Universe was released on 13 November 2015. The album was ELO's first album of new material since 2001's Zoom. The first track, and single, "When I Was a Boy" was made available for streaming on the same day and a music video for the song was also released. A small promotional tour followed the album's release which saw Jeff Lynne's ELO perform a full concert for BBC Radio 2 along with their first two shows in the United States in 30 years, both which sold out very quickly. Jeff Lynne's ELO also made rare US television appearances on The Tonight Show Starring Jimmy Fallon, Jimmy Kimmel Live and CBS This Morning. A 19-date European tour was announced for 2016, with the band playing the Pyramid Stage at Glastonbury Festival on 26 June 2016.

In 2017, they played their "Alone in the Universe" tour. That same year, on 7 April, they played at the Rock and Roll Hall of Fame as they were inducted during the 32nd Annual Induction Ceremony.

The band continued to tour in 2018 in North America and Europe. A video was created for the City of Birmingham which used the original recording of "Mr. Blue Sky" as its music; this was played at the Gold Coast 2018 Commonwealth Games Closing Ceremony during the handover presentation of Birmingham 2022.

On 3 August 2018, Secret Messages was reissued "as originally conceived" as a double album. It included several cut tracks, such as the CD exclusive bonus track "Time After Time", B-side exclusives "Buildings Have Eyes" and "After All", the Afterglow exclusives "Mandalay" and "Hello My Old Friend", and the 2001 reissue exclusives "Endless Lies" and "No Way Out".

On 22 October 2018, Lynne announced that Jeff Lynne's ELO would embark on a 2019 North American tour from June to August 2019.

ELO released their 14th album, From Out of Nowhere, on 1 November 2019. While a tour from the album was announced to begin in October 2020, the official Jeff Lynne's ELO Twitter page then later announced that the tour was cancelled due to the COVID-19 pandemic.

== Official members ==
Image	Name	Years active	Instruments	Release contributions
	Jeff Lynne	1970–1986; 2000–2001; 2014–present	lead and backing vocals; guitar; piano; bass; drums; keyboards	all Electric Light Orchestra releases

=== Former members ===
Image	Name	Years active	Instruments	Release contributions
	Roy Wood	1970– 1972	lead and backing vocals; guitar; bass; cello; oboe; bassoon	The Electric Light Orchestra (1971); ELO 2 (1973; 2 tracks)
	Bev Bevan	1970–1983; 1985–1986	drums; percussion; backing vocals	all Electric Light Orchestra releases from The Electric Light Orchestra (1971) to Balance of Power (1986)
	Rick Price	1970–1971 (died 2022)	bass	none
	Bill Hunt	1971 – 1972	French horn; keyboards; hunting horn	The Electric Light Orchestra (1971); ELO 2 (1973; 2 tracks)
	Steve Woolam	1971 (died 1971)	violin	The Electric Light Orchestra (1971)
	Richard Tandy	1972–1986; 2000–2001; 2014–2017 (died 2024)	piano; keyboards; bass; backing vocals; occasional guitar	all Electric Light Orchestra releases from ELO 2 (1973) to Balance of Power (1986), Guest appearances on Zoom (2001) and From Out of Nowhere (2019)
	Andy Craig	1972	cello	none
	Hugh McDowell	1972; 1973–1980 (died 2018)	cello	ELO 2 (1973; 2 tracks); Eldorado (1974); Face the Music (1975); A New World Record (1976); Out of the Blue (1977); Discovery (1979; uncredited)
	Wilfred Gibson	1972–1973 (died 2014)	violin	ELO 2 (1973); On the Third Day (1973)
	Mike Edwards	1972–1974 (died 2010)	cello	ELO 2 (1973); On the Third Day (1973); Eldorado (1974)
	Colin Walker	1972–1973	cello	ELO 2 (1973; 3 tracks); On the Third Day (1973)
	Trevor Smith	1972	cello; sound engineer	none
	Glenn Hughes	1972	bass; backing vocals	none
	Mike de Albuquerque	1972–1974	bass; backing vocals	ELO 2 (1973; 3 tracks); On the Third Day (1973); Eldorado (1974)
	Carl Wayne	1973 (died 2004)	vocals	ELO 2 (1973)
	Mik Kaminski	1973–1980; contract member 1981–1986	violin; occasional keyboards	all Electric Light Orchestra releases from On the Third Day (1973) to Discovery (1979); Secret Messages (1983)
	Kelly Groucutt	1974 – 1983 (died 2009)	bass; backing and lead vocals	all Electric Light Orchestra releases from Face the Music (1975) to Secret Messages (1983)
	Melvyn Gale	1974–1980	cello; occasional piano	Face the Music (1975); A New World Record (1976); Out of the Blue (1977); Discovery (1979; uncredited)

== Touring musicians ==
Image	Name	Years active	Instruments
	Louis Clark	1981–1986 (died 2021)	synthesizers; keyboards
	David Scott-Morgan	1981–1986	guitar; synthesizers; backing vocals
	Martin Smith	1986	bass; backing vocals
	Marc Mann	2001	guitar; keyboards; backing vocals
	Rosie Vela	2001	backing vocals
	Gregg Bissonette	2001	drums; backing vocals
	Matt Bissonette	2001	bass; backing vocals
	Peggy Baldwin	2001	cello
	Sarah O'Brien	2001	cello
	Mick Wilson	2014	percussion; backing vocals; guitar
	Chereene Allen	2014	violin
	Milton McDonald	2014–2025	guitar; backing vocals
	Mike Stevens	2014–2025	guitar; backing vocals
	Iain Hornal	2014–2025	backing and lead vocals; guitar; percussion
	Lee Pomeroy	2014–2025	bass; backing vocals
	Marcus Byrne	2014–2025	keyboards; piano
	Donavan Hepburn	2014–2025	drums
	Melanie Lewis-McDonald	2014–2025	backing and lead vocals; percussion
	Bernie Smith	2014–2017	keyboards
	Amy Langley	2016–2020; 2024–2025	cello
	Jess Cox	2016–2020; 2024–2025	cello
	Rosie Langley	2016–2019	violin
	Jo Webb	2017–2025	keyboards; acoustic guitar; backing vocals
	Steve Turner	2017–2020	keyboards
	Jessie Murphy	2019–2020; 2024–2025	violin
	Leah Zeger	2023	violin
	Michelle Elliott Rearick	2023	cello
	Judy Kang	2023	cello
	Shannon Harris	2024–2025	keyboards

== Line-ups ==
=== ELO ===
Period	Members	Studio releases
1970–1971	Roy Wood – vocals, guitar, cello; Jeff Lynne – vocals, guitar; Bev Bevan – drums; Rick Price – bass	—
1971	Roy Wood – vocals, guitar, bass, cello, oboe; Jeff Lynne – vocals, guitar, bass, piano; Bev Bevan – drums; Bill Hunt – French horn; Steve Woolam – violin	The Electric Light Orchestra, December 1971
October 1971 – January 1972	Roy Wood – vocals, guitar, bass, cello, oboe; Jeff Lynne – vocals, guitar, bass; Bev Bevan – drums; Bill Hunt – French horn; Steve Woolam – violin; Richard Tandy – bass, piano; Andy Craig – cello	—
January–July 1972	Roy Wood – vocals, guitar, bass, cello, saxophone; Jeff Lynne – vocals, guitar, bass; Bev Bevan – drums; Bill Hunt – piano, French horn; Richard Tandy – bass, piano; Wilfred Gibson – violin; Andy Craig – cello; Hugh McDowell – cello; Mike Edwards – cello	ELO 2, (tracks 1 and 4) January 1973 – also first touring lineup
August 1972 – May 1973	Jeff Lynne – vocals, guitar; Bev Bevan – drums; Richard Tandy – piano, keyboards; Wilfred Gibson – violin; Mike Edwards – cello; Colin Walker – cello; Mike de Albuquerque – bass, backing vocals	ELO 2, (remaining tracks) January 1973
May–September 1973	Jeff Lynne – vocals, guitar; Bev Bevan – drums; Richard Tandy – piano, keyboards; Mike Edwards – cello; Mike de Albuquerque – bass, backing vocals; Mik Kaminski – violin	On the Third Day, November 1973
September 1973 – November 1974	Jeff Lynne – vocals, guitar; Bev Bevan – drums; Richard Tandy – piano, keyboards; Mike Edwards – cello; Mike de Albuquerque – bass, backing vocals; Mik Kaminski – violin; Hugh McDowell – cello	Eldorado, September 1974
November 1974 – January 1980 ("classic lineup")	Jeff Lynne – vocals, guitar; Bev Bevan – drums; Richard Tandy – piano, keyboards; Mik Kaminski – violin; Hugh McDowell – cello; Melvyn Gale – cello; Kelly Groucutt – bass, vocals	Face the Music, September 1975; A New World Record, September 1976; Out of the Blue, October 1977; Discovery, May 1979 (Kaminski, McDowell and Gale uncredited)
January 1980 – 1983	Jeff Lynne – vocals, guitar, keyboards; Bev Bevan – drums; Richard Tandy – piano, keyboards; Kelly Groucutt – bass, vocals; touring musicians: Mik Kaminski – violin (1981–1982); Louis Clark – string synthesizer (1981–1982); Dave Morgan – acoustic guitar, backing vocals (1981–1982)	Xanadu, August 1980; Time, July 1981; Secret Messages, June 1983
1984–1986	Jeff Lynne – vocals, guitar, bass, keyboards; Bev Bevan – drums; Richard Tandy – piano, keyboards; touring musicians: Mik Kaminski – violin; Louis Clark – string synthesizer; Dave Morgan – acoustic guitar, backing vocals, synthesizers; Martin Smith – bass, backing vocals	Balance of Power, February 1986
disbanded 1986–2000
2000–2001	Jeff Lynne – vocals, guitar, bass, keyboards, drums; Richard Tandy – keyboards, piano; touring musicians: Marc Mann – guitar, keyboards, backing vocals; Matt Bissonette – bass, backing vocals; Greg Bissonette – drums, backing vocals; Rosie Vela – backing vocals, percussion; Peggy Baldwin – cello; Sarah O'Brien – cello	Zoom, June 2001

=== Jeff Lynne's ELO ===
Period	Members	Releases
2014–2024	Jeff Lynne – vocals, guitar; Richard Tandy – piano, keyboards; touring musicians: Milton McDonald – lead guitar, backing vocals; Mike Stevens – rhythm guitar, harmonica, backing vocals, musical director; Marcus Byrne – piano, keyboards; Lee Pomeroy – bass, backing vocals; Donavan Hepburn – drums; Melanie Lewis-McDonald – backing vocals; Iain Hornal – backing and lead vocals, 12-string acoustic guitar, percussion; Bernie Smith – keyboards (2014–2017); Mick Wilson – percussion, guitar, backing vocals (2014); Chereen Allen – violin (2014); Jess Cox – cello (2016–2020); Amy Langley – cello (2016–2020); Rosie Langley – violin (2016–2019); Jo Webb – keyboards, acoustic and electric guitar, backing vocals (since 2017); Steve Turner – keyboards (2017–2020); Jessie Murphy – violin (2019–2020); Leah Zeger – violin (2023); Michelle Elliott Rearick – cello (2023); Judy Kang – cello (2023)	Jeff Lynne's ELO: Live in Hyde Park (2015); Alone in the Universe (2015) - without Tandy; Wembley or Bust (2017) - without Tandy; From Out of Nowhere (2019)
2024–present	Jeff Lynne – vocals, guitar; touring musicians: Milton McDonald – lead guitar, backing vocals; Mike Stevens – rhythm guitar, harmonica, backing vocals, musical director; Marcus Byrne – piano, keyboards; Lee Pomeroy – bass, backing vocals; Donovan Hepburn – drums; Melanie Lewis-McDonald – backing vocals; Iain Hornal – backing and lead vocals, 12-string acoustic guitar, percussion; Jo Webb – keyboards, acoustic and electric guitar, backing vocals; Jessie Murphy – violin; Jess Cox – cello; Amy Langley – cello; Shannon Harris – keyboards, percussion	Jeff Lynne's ELO: The Over and Out Tour (2024)
