= Light Years, The Very Best of Electric Light Orchestra =

Greatest hits album by Electric Light Orchestra
- Released: November 1997
- Recorded: July 1970–January 1986
- Genre: Rock
- Length: 148:04
- Label: Epic Records
- Producer: Jeff Lynne

Electric Light Orchestra chronology
Strange Magic: The Best of Electric Light Orchestra (1995)	Light Years, The Very Best of Electric Light Orchestra (1997)	Live at Wembley '78 (1998)

Professional ratings
Review scores
Source	Rating
Allmusic	4/5 stars
Encyclopedia of Popular Music	3/5 stars

Light Years, The Very Best of Electric Light Orchestra is a two CD compilation album by Electric Light Orchestra (ELO), released in 1997.

The album celebrates the band's 25th Anniversary singles career starting in 1972 and contains all of ELO's 29 UK hit singles plus other single edits that either didn't chart or were hits in other countries.

All the songs included are reputed to be the edited 7" single versions; analysis of the vinyl 7" singles contradicts the claim. For example, the intro/count-in of "Four Little Diamonds" was trimmed from the original 7", but included here; the intro of "Strange Magic" was shorter on the 7".

It is also the first ELO compilation to feature the song "Across the Border" which was scheduled to be released as an EP track in 1980 but was withdrawn. Although not in chronological order, it is however the most comprehensive assemblage of the band's hits of the many compilations available.

The album reached 60 in the UK Album Charts. The album was also released in Europe with an identical track order under the titles, The Swedish Collection and The Danish Collection released in 2000.

== Track listing ==
Disc one
No.	Title	Original album	Length
1.	"Turn to Stone"	Out of the Blue, 1977	3:47
2.	"Evil Woman"	Face the Music, 1975	4:15
3.	"Livin' Thing"	A New World Record, 1976	3:32
4.	"Twilight"	Time, 1981	3:37
5.	"Telephone Line"	A New World Record	4:41
6.	"Four Little Diamonds"	Secret Messages, 1983	4:06
7.	"Xanadu" (with Olivia Newton-John)	Xanadu soundtrack, 1980	3:27
8.	"Last Train to London"	Discovery, 1979	4:32
9.	"Strange Magic" (7" edit)	Face the Music	4:06
10.	"Ma-Ma-Ma Belle" (7" edit)	On the Third Day, 1973	3:11
11.	"Confusion"	Discovery	3:40
12.	"Rock 'n' Roll Is King"	Secret Messages	3:05
13.	"The Way Life's Meant to Be"	Time	4:39
14.	"Can't Get It Out of My Head" (7" edit)	Eldorado, 1974	3:07
15.	"Secret Messages" (Special version from the LP)	Secret Messages	3:34
16.	"Calling America"	Balance of Power, 1986	3:28
17.	"Don't Walk Away"	Xanadu soundtrack	4:39
18.	"Don't Bring Me Down"	Discovery	4:03
19.	"Mr. Blue Sky"	Out of the Blue	5:03

Disc two
No.	Title	Original album	Length
1.	"Sweet Talkin' Woman"	Out of the Blue	3:47
2.	"I'm Alive"	Xanadu soundtrack	3:43
3.	"Shine a Little Love"	Discovery	4:10
4.	"Ticket to the Moon"	Time	4:07
5.	"Illusions in G Major"	Eldorado	2:38
6.	"So Serious"	Balance of Power	2:41
7.	"Nightrider" (7" edit)	Face the Music	3:43
8.	"All Over the World"	Xanadu soundtrack	4:01
9.	"Here Is the News"	Time	3:44
10.	"The Diary of Horace Wimp"	Discovery	4:17
11.	"Across the Border" (EP version)	Out of the Blue	3:51
12.	"Showdown"	On the Third Day (U.S.); Showdown, 1974	4:10
13.	"Hold on Tight"	Time	3:07
14.	"Wild West Hero"	Out of the Blue	4:40
15.	"Do Ya"	A New World Record	3:45
16.	"10538 Overture" (7" edit)	The Electric Light Orchestra/No Answer, 1971	3:56
17.	"Getting to the Point"	Balance of Power	4:29
18.	"Rockaria!"	A New World Record	3:14
19.	"Roll Over Beethoven" (7" edit)	ELO 2, 1973	4:34
Total length:			148:04

== Personnel ==
- Jeff Lynne – vocals, guitars, keyboards
- Roy Wood – vocals, cello, oboe, bass guitar
- Bev Bevan – drums, percussion
- Richard Tandy – synthesizers, mellotron, clavinet, piano, guitar
- Kelly Groucutt – vocals, bass guitar
- Hugh McDowell – cello
- Mik Kaminski – violin
- Melvyn Gale – cello
- Mike de Albuquerque – bass guitar, vocals
- Mike Edwards – cello
- Wilf Gibson – violin
- Colin Walker – cello
- Bill Hunt – French horn
- Steve Woolam – violin

== Charts ==
Chart (1997–1999)	Peak position
Norwegian Albums (VG-lista)	10
Scottish Albums (OCC)	81
Spanish Albums (AFYVE)	41
UK Albums (OCC)	60

== Certifications ==
Region	Certification	Certified units/sales
Norway (IFPI Norway)	Gold	25,000^{*}
United Kingdom (BPI)	Gold	100,000^{*}
^{*} Sales figures based on certification alone.
