= Flashback (Electric Light Orchestra album) =

Box set by Electric Light Orchestra
- Released: 21 November 2000
- Recorded: 1970–2000
- Genre: Rock
- Length: 213:13
- Label: Epic/Legacy
- Producer: Jeff Lynne, Al Quaglieri, Jeff Magid

Electric Light Orchestra chronology
Friends & Relatives (1999)	Flashback (2000)	The Ultimate Collection (2001)

Professional ratings
Review scores
Source	Rating
AllMusic	4.5/5 stars
Encyclopedia of Popular Music	4/5 stars
The Rolling Stone Album Guide	3/5 stars

Flashback is the second box set compilation by Electric Light Orchestra (ELO), released in November 2000 in the US and the following month in the UK.

== History ==
In 2000, Jeff Lynne found a new impetus to work on the music of his old band and returned to the recording studio to work on an ELO project for the first time in some 15 years. This was just prior to his return to recording under the ELO name with the album Zoom in 2001. This work resulted in a digitally remastered compilation released in late 2000. Unlike its predecessors, this project, Flashback, was personally approved and endorsed by Lynne. The set includes songs featured from all 11 studio albums up to that point, including an edit of "Great Balls of Fire" from their live album The Night the Light Went On in Long Beach, most of their singles (albeit in their album versions) excluding 'Wild West Hero', the Double A-side "Ticket To The Moon"/"Here Is The News" and the tracks from the OST Xanadu plus some new recordings amongst the band's extensive back catalogue, most notably a reworking of Lynne's only UK number one hit "Xanadu". The album includes a booklet inside, plus liner notes by David Wild with quotes on each song from Lynne.

== Track listing ==
All tracks written by Jeff Lynne, except where noted. Tracks marked (*) co-produced by Roy Wood.

=== CD 1 ===
No.	Title	Writer(s)	Original album	Length
1.	"10538 Overture *"		The Electric Light Orchestra/No Answer, 1971 (UK)/1972 (US)	5:32
2.	"Showdown"		On the Third Day (US), 1973; Showdown, 1974	4:12
3.	"Ma-Ma-Ma Belle"		On the Third Day	3:55
4.	"Mr. Radio *"		The Electric Light Orchestra/No Answer	5:04
5.	"Roll Over Beethoven"	Chuck Berry	ELO 2, 1973	7:48
6.	"Mama" (New edit)		ELO 2	4:06
7.	"One Summer Dream" (Single version)		Face the Music, 1975	5:21
8.	"Illusions in G Major"		Eldorado, 1974	2:41
9.	"Strange Magic"		Face the Music	4:29
10.	"Eldorado Overture"		Eldorado	2:12
11.	"Can't Get It Out of My Head"		Eldorado	4:24
12.	"Eldorado"		Eldorado	5:18
13.	"Eldorado Finale"		Eldorado	1:29
14.	"Do Ya" (Unedited alternative mix)		Previously unreleased; Originally from A New World Record, 1976	4:09
15.	"Mister Kingdom"		Eldorado	5:08
16.	"Grieg's Piano Concerto in A Minor"	Edvard Grieg	Previously unreleased, 2000 (recorded 1982)	2:58

=== CD 2 ===
No.	Title	Original album	Length
1.	"Tightrope"	A New World Record	5:23
2.	"Evil Woman"	Face the Music	4:19
3.	"Livin' Thing"	A New World Record	3:33
4.	"Mr. Blue Sky"	Out of the Blue, 1977	5:07
5.	"Mission (A World Record)" (Alternative mix)	Previously unreleased; originally from A New World Record	4:31
6.	"Turn to Stone"	Out of the Blue	3:48
7.	"Telephone Line"	A New World Record	4:45
8.	"Rockaria!"	A New World Record	3:15
9.	"Starlight"	Out of the Blue	4:45
10.	"It's Over"	Out of the Blue	3:55
11.	"The Whale"	Out of the Blue	5:07
12.	"Sweet Talkin' Woman"	Out of the Blue	3:49
13.	"Big Wheels"	Out of the Blue	5:32
14.	"Shangri-La"	A New World Record	5:36
15.	"Nightrider"	Face the Music	4:24
16.	"Tears in Your Life"	Previously unreleased (recorded 1982)	3:05

=== CD 3 ===
No.	Title	Writer(s)	Original album	Length
1.	"Don't Bring Me Down"		Discovery, 1979	4:04
2.	"The Diary of Horace Wimp"		Discovery	4:17
3.	"Twilight"		Time, 1981	3:43
4.	"Secret Messages"		Secret Messages, 1983	4:38
5.	"Take Me On and On"		Secret Messages	4:58
6.	"Shine a Little Love"		Discovery	4:11
7.	"Rock 'n' Roll Is King"		Secret Messages	3:15
8.	"Last Train to London"		Discovery	4:31
9.	"Confusion"		Discovery	3:40
10.	"Getting to the Point"		Balance of Power, 1986	4:51
11.	"Hold on Tight"		Time	3:07
12.	"So Serious"		Balance of Power	2:43
13.	"Calling America"		Balance of Power	3:26
14.	"Four Little Diamonds"		Secret Messages	4:06
15.	"Great Balls of Fire" (Live)	Otis Blackwell, Jack Hammer	The Night the Light Went On in Long Beach, 1974	3:06
16.	"Xanadu" (New version)		Previously unreleased; originally from the Xanadu soundtrack, 1980	3:21
17.	"Indian Queen" (Demo)		Previously unreleased (recorded 1973)	0:57
18.	"Love Changes All"		Previously unreleased (recorded 1980)	3:28
19.	"After All"		Previously unreleased on CD; originally B-side to "Rock 'n' Roll Is King" single, 1983	2:24
20.	"Helpless"		Previously unreleased (recorded 1982)	3:19
21.	"Who's That?"		Previously unreleased (recorded 1982)	1:26

== Personnel ==
- Jeff Lynne – vocals, electric guitar, acoustic guitar, bass guitar, keyboards, drums, percussion, producer (1970–1986, 2000)
- Roy Wood – vocals, electric guitar, classical guitar, cello, bass guitar, wind instruments, producer (1970)
- Bev Bevan – drums, percussion, vocals (1970–1986)
- Richard Tandy – keyboards, electric guitar, vocals (1970–1986)
- Michael d'Albuquerque – bass guitar, vocals (1972–1974)
- Kelly Groucutt – bass guitar, vocals (1975–1983)
- Bill Hunt – french horn (1970)
- Steve Woolam – violin (1970)
- Wilfred Gibson – violin (1972–1973)
- Mik Kaminski – violin (1973–1977, 1983)
- Mike Edwards – cello (1972–1974)
- Colin Walker – cello (1972–1973)
- Hugh McDowell – cello (1973–1977)
- Melvyn Gale – cello (1975–1977)
- Marc Bolan – electric guitar on "Ma-Ma-Ma Belle" (1973)
- Marc Mann – keyboards on "Xanadu", engineer, mastering assistant (2000)
- Mary Thomas (soprano) - operatic vocals on "Rockaria!"
- Al Quaglieri – producer (2000)
- Jeff Magid – producer (2000)
- Doug Sax, Robert Hadley – digital remastering at The Mastering Lab, Hollywood, California
- Ryan Ulyate – engineer, mastering assistant (2000)
- David Wild – liner notes (2000)

== See also ==
- Afterglow
