= All Over the World: The Very Best of Electric Light Orchestra =

Greatest hits album by Electric Light Orchestra
- Released: 6 June 2005
- Recorded: 1973–2000
- Genre: Pop rock
- Length: 78:20
- Label: Sony Music Australia
- Producer: Jeff Lynne

Electric Light Orchestra chronology
The Essential Electric Light Orchestra (2003)	All Over the World: The Very Best of Electric Light Orchestra (2005)	Ticket to the Moon: The Very Best of Electric Light Orchestra Volume 2 (2007)

2011 re-issue slip cover

Professional ratings
Review scores
Source	Rating
AllMusic	4/5 stars
Encyclopedia of Popular Music	4/5 stars
The Music Box	4/5 stars
Pitchfork	7.7/10
PopMatters	7/10

All Over the World: The Very Best of Electric Light Orchestra is a compilation album by the Electric Light Orchestra, released in 2005.

== Overview ==
The album concentrates on the band's biggest singles released between late 1973 and 1983. The albums The Electric Light Orchestra, ELO 2, Eldorado, and Balance of Power were not represented on the compilation. A companion album Ticket to the Moon: The Very Best of Electric Light Orchestra Volume 2 featuring additional hit singles and deeper album cuts was released in 2007.

== Release and reception ==
Originally released exclusively in the band's home market (the UK), the album sold very well, becoming the ELO's first top-ten entry since Dino Records' compilation album The Very Best of the Electric Light Orchestra hit number 4 in 1994. All Over the World sold over 300,000 copies in the UK alone within a year and a half of its release.

The album was repackaged with new album art and re-released on 30 May 2011, once more reaching the UK top ten. It sold 848,021 copies by December 2014.

Following the band's appearance at the Glastonbury Festival in the legends slot in 2016, the album re-entered the chart, reaching No. 1 in the week ending 4 August 2016, and passed its million sales mark 11 years after its release.

== Track listing ==
All tracks written by Jeff Lynne.

All Over the World: The Very Best of Electric Light Orchestra track listing
No.	Title	Original album	Length
1.	"Mr. Blue Sky"	Out of the Blue, 1977	5:02
2.	"Evil Woman"	Face the Music, 1975	4:11
3.	"Don't Bring Me Down"	Discovery, 1979	4:03
4.	"Sweet Talkin' Woman"	Out of the Blue	3:47
5.	"Shine a Little Love"	Discovery	4:11
6.	"Turn to Stone"	Out of the Blue	3:48
7.	"The Diary of Horace Wimp"	Discovery	4:16
8.	"Confusion"	Discovery	3:41
9.	"Hold on Tight"	Time, 1981	3:06
10.	"Livin' Thing"	A New World Record, 1976	3:31
11.	"Telephone Line"	A New World Record	4:39
12.	"All Over the World"	Xanadu, 1980	4:03
13.	"Wild West Hero"	Out of the Blue	4:40
14.	"Showdown"	On the Third Day, 1973	4:11
15.	"Ma-Ma-Ma Belle"	On the Third Day	3:37
16.	"Xanadu" (New version)	Flashback, original version from Xanadu	3:21
17.	"Rockaria!"	A New World Record	3:12
18.	"Strange Magic"	Face the Music	4:07
19.	"Alright"	Zoom, 2001	3:10
20.	"Rock 'n' Roll Is King" (Single edit)	Secret Messages, 1983	3:07
Total length:			78:20

== Personnel ==
- Jeff Lynne – vocals, lead & rhythm guitars, keyboards, bass ("Xanadu (New version)", "Alright"), drums ("Xanadu (New version)", "Alright"), string arrangements
- Bev Bevan – drums, percussion, backing vocals (All tracks except "Xanadu (New version" and "Alright")
- Richard Tandy – keyboards, guitar, string arrangements, backing vocals
- Kelly Groucutt – bass, backing vocals (All tracks except "Showdown", "Ma-Ma-Ma Belle", "Xanadu (New version)" and "Alright")
- Mik Kaminski – violin (All tracks except "Don't Bring Me Down", "Hold On Tight", "All Over the World", "Showdown", "Ma-Ma-Ma Belle", "Xanadu (New version)" and "Alright")
- Hugh McDowell – cello (All tracks except "Don't Bring Me Down", "Hold On Tight", "All Over the World", "Showdown", "Ma-Ma-Ma Belle", "Xanadu (New version)", "Alright" and "Rock 'n' Roll Is King")
- Melvyn Gale – cello (All tracks except "Don't Bring Me Down", "Hold On Tight", "All Over the World", "Showdown", "Ma-Ma-Ma Belle", "Xanadu (New version)", "Alright" and "Rock 'n' Roll Is King")
- Louis Clark – string arrangements (All tracks except "Don't Bring Me Down", "Showdown", "Ma-Ma-Ma Belle", "Xanadu (New version)", "Alright" and "Rock 'n' Roll Is King")
- Mike de Albuquerque – bass, backing vocals ("Showdown", "Ma-Ma-Ma Belle")
- Mike Edwards – cello ("Showdown", "Ma-Ma-Ma Belle")
- Wilf Gibson – violin ("Showdown", "Ma-Ma-Ma Belle")
- Colin Walker – cello ("Showdown", "Ma-Ma-Ma Belle")
- Marc Bolan – co-lead guitar ("Ma-Ma-Ma Belle")
- Marc Mann – keyboards ("Xanadu (New version)")
- Rosie Vela – backing vocals ("Alright")
- Dave Morgan – backing vocals ("Rock 'n' Roll Is King")

== Charts ==
=== Weekly charts ===
Weekly chart performance for All Over the World: The Very Best of Electric Light Orchestra
Chart (2005–2021)	Peak position
Australian Albums (ARIA)	35
Canadian Albums (Billboard)	91
Danish Albums (Hitlisten)	2
Dutch Albums (Album Top 100)	71
New Zealand Albums (RMNZ)	9
Norwegian Albums (VG-lista)	29
Spanish Albums (Promusicae)	99
Swedish Albums (Sverigetopplistan)	6
Swiss Albums (Schweizer Hitparade)	89
UK Albums (OCC)	1
US Billboard 200	72 (Note: First charted at number 128 in the week of 1 September 2012 after the London Olympics opening and closing ceremonies featured "Mr. Blue Sky"; peaked at number 72 week of 27 November 2021.)
US Top Catalog Albums (Billboard)	21
US Top Rock Albums (Billboard)	12

=== Year-end charts ===
Year-end chart performance for All Over the World: The Very Best of Electric Light Orchestra
Chart (2005)	Position
UK Albums (OCC)	93
Chart (2011)	Position
Swedish Albums (Sverigetopplistan)	47
UK Albums (OCC)	110
Chart (2015)	Position
UK Albums (OCC)	93
Chart (2016)	Position
UK Albums (OCC)	21
Chart (2017)	Position
UK Albums (OCC)	74
Chart (2018)	Position
UK Albums (OCC)	99

=== Decade-end charts ===
Decade-end chart performance for All Over the World: The Very Best of Electric Light Orchestra
Chart (2010–2019)	Position
UK Albums (OCC)	66

== Certifications ==
Certifications for All Over the World: The Very Best of Electric Light Orchestra
Region	Certification	Certified units/sales
Australia (ARIA)	Platinum	70,000^{^}
Germany (BVMI)	Gold	100,000^{‡}
New Zealand (RMNZ)	Gold	7,500^{^}
United Kingdom (BPI)	5× Platinum	1,067,791
^{^} Shipments figures based on certification alone.^{‡} Sales+streaming figures based on certification alone.
