= ELO's Greatest Hits =

Greatest hits album by Electric Light Orchestra
- Released: 23 November 1979
- Recorded: April 1973–August 1977
- Length: 44:50
- Labels: Jet; CBS
- Producer: Jeff Lynne

Electric Light Orchestra chronology
Discovery (1979)	ELO's Greatest Hits (1979)	A Box of Their Best (1980)

Professional ratings
Review scores
Source	Rating
AllMusic	4/5 stars
Christgau's Record Guide	B+
Encyclopedia of Popular Music	4/5 stars
MusicHound	3/5
The Rolling Stone Album Guide	4/5 stars
Record Mirror	4/5 stars

ELO's Greatest Hits is a compilation by the Electric Light Orchestra (ELO), released on 23 November 1979. Despite being released after the album Discovery, this album omitted the band's most recent hits, "Don't Bring Me Down" and "Shine a Little Love".

The album sleeve art features a letter written by the band's co-founder and leader, Jeff Lynne, describing the '73–'78 period and the recording of each of the songs.

== Track listing ==
All tracks written by Jeff Lynne.

Side one

#	Title	Album	Length
1	"Evil Woman" (Single version)	Face the Music (1975)	4:11
2	"Livin' Thing"	A New World Record (1976)	3:31
3	"Can't Get It Out of My Head"	Eldorado (1974)	4:23
4	"Showdown" (U.S. single edit)	On the Third Day (U.S.) (1973); Showdown (UK) (1974)	3:53
5	"Turn to Stone"	Out of the Blue (1977)	3:47
6	"Rockaria!"	A New World Record (1976)	3:14

Side two

#	Title	Album	Length
1	"Sweet Talkin' Woman"	Out of the Blue (1977)	3:47
2	"Telephone Line"	A New World Record (1976)	4:38
3	"Ma-Ma-Ma Belle" (Single edit)	On the Third Day (1973)	3:35
4	"Strange Magic" (UK single version)	Face the Music (1975)	4:07
5	"Mr. Blue Sky"	Out of the Blue (1977)	5:05

== Personnel ==
- Jeff Lynne – vocals, guitars
- Bev Bevan – drums, percussion
- Richard Tandy – keyboards
- Mike de Albuquerque – bass (to 1974)
- Kelly Groucutt – bass, vocals (1974 onwards)
- Mik Kaminski – violin
- Mike Edwards – cello (to 1974)
- Melvyn Gale – cello (1975 onwards)
- Hugh McDowell – cello
- Wilfred Gibson – violin on "Showdown" and "Ma-Ma-Ma Belle"
- Colin Walker – cello on "Showdown" and "Ma-Ma-Ma Belle"
- Marc Bolan – guitar on "Ma-Ma-Ma Belle"

== Charts ==
=== Weekly charts ===
Chart (1979–1980)	Peak position
Argentinian Albums Chart	7
Australian Albums (Kent Music Report)	1
Austrian Albums (Ö3 Austria)	17
Canada Top Albums/CDs (RPM)	6
New Zealand Albums (RMNZ)	2
Norwegian Albums (VG-lista)	13
Spanish Albums (AFYVE)	28
UK Albums (Official Charts)	7
US Billboard 200	30

=== Year-end charts ===
Chart (1980)	Position
Canada Top Albums/CDs (RPM)	35

== Certifications ==
Region	Certification	Certified units/sales
Australia (ARIA)	Platinum	50,000^{^}
Canada (Music Canada)	Platinum	100,000^{^}
Hong Kong (IFPI Hong Kong)	Gold	10,000^{*}
United Kingdom (BPI)	Platinum	300,000^{^}
United States (RIAA)	4× Platinum	4,000,000^{^}
^{*} Sales figures based on certification alone.^{^} Shipments figures based on certification alone.
