= Definitive Collection (Electric Light Orchestra album) =

Greatest hits album by Electric Light Orchestra
- Released: 1995
- Recorded: July 1970 – January 1986
- Genre: Rock
- Length: 110:44
- Label: Epic/Legacy E3K 85123
- Producer: Jeff Lynne

Electric Light Orchestra chronology
Live at Winterland '76 (1998)	Definitive Collection (1995)	The BBC Sessions (1999)

Professional ratings
Review scores
Source	Rating
Allmusic	3/5 stars

Definitive Collection is a compilation album recorded by the Electric Light Orchestra (ELO) and produced by Jeff Lynne. It was released in 1995 with two discs. Some of the songs include their album versions like "Strange Magic" and "Shine a Little Love", and some tracks include edits seen below.

== Compilation edits ==
Many edits are featured in this album. "Can't Get It Out of My Head" has a small portion of "Eldorado Overture" left off on it, "Above the Clouds" is connected with "Livin' Thing" and is not credited on the track listing, "So Fine" leaves a portion of the fade into "Rockaria!", "Turn to Stone" does not include the full fade in of the synthesizer and guitars, part of the tuning radio on "Mr. Blue Sky" is gone, "Twilight" has a fade in from the previous track (on the Time album), "Prologue", the end of "Twilight" and the intro of "Rock 'n' Roll Is King" are transited, and "Secret Messages" has no fade in and goes straight to the backmasking lyrics.

== Cover ==
The front cover of the Definitive Collection is a collage of many different past ELO covers such as, Face the Music, A New World Record, Out of the Blue, one of the pictures in the booklet of Balance of Power, and mostly Secret Messages.

== Track listing ==
All tracks are written by Jeff Lynne, except where noted

Disc One
No.	Title	Length
1.	"Showdown"	4:11
2.	"Eldorado Overture"	2:12
3.	"Can't Get It Out of My Head"	4:24
4.	"Evil Woman"	4:17
5.	"Strange Magic"	4:29
6.	"Livin' Thing & Above the Clouds" (Credited as Livin' Thing)	5:50
7.	"So Fine"	3:55
8.	"Rockaria!"	3:14
9.	"Sweet Talkin' Woman"	3:47
10.	"Turn to Stone"	3:47
11.	"Mr. Blue Sky"	5:04
12.	"Don't Bring Me Down"	4:02
13.	"Shine a Little Love"	4:40
14.	"The Diary of Horace Wimp"	4:17
15.	"All Over the World"	4:03
16.	"Twilight"	3:47
17.	"Rock 'n' Roll Is King"	3:37
18.	"Hold On Tight"	3:04
19.	"Secret Messages"	4:32

Disc Two
No.	Title	Writer(s)	Length
20.	"10538 Overture"		5:30
21.	"Roll Over Beethoven" (Single edit)	Chuck Berry	4:34
22.	"Poor Boy (The Greenwood)"		3:00
23.	"Telephone Line"		4:42
24.	"Last Train to London"		4:34
25.	"I'm Alive"		3:46
26.	"Here Is the News"		3:49
27.	"Calling America"		3:28

== Personnel ==
- Jeff Lynne – lead vocals, guitars, keyboards, bass guitar (all tracks)
- Richard Tandy – piano, keyboards, synthesizer, backing vocals (all tracks)
- Bev Bevan – drums, percussion, backing vocals (all tracks)
- Kelly Groucutt – backing vocals, bass guitar (CD 1 – tracks 4–18; CD 2 – tracks 22–25)
- Mik Kaminski – violin (CD 1 – tracks 2–9, 11, 17; CD 2 – track 3)
- Melvyn Gale – cello (CD 1 – tracks 4–8, 11; CD 2 – track 3)
- Hugh McDowell – cello (CD 1 – tracks 4–8, 11; CD 2 – track 3)

Additional

- Mike de Albuquerque – bass guitar, backing vocals (CD 1 – track 1, 3; CD 2 – track 2)
- Mike Edwards – cello (CD 1 – track 1–3; CD 2 – track 2)
- Wilfred Gibson – violin (CD 1 – track 1; CD 2 – track 2)
- Roy Wood – cello, bass guitar, wind instruments (CD 2 – track 1)
- Colin Walker – cello (CD 1 – track 1)
