= Out of the Blue: Live at Wembley =

Video by Electric Light Orchestra
- Released: 1980 (VHS, Betamax, Laserdisc); 1989 (VHS); 1998 (VHS, DVD); 2006 (DVD); 2015 (Blu-ray)
- Recorded: June 1978
- Genre: Rock
- Label: An MGM/CBS Home Video Presentation (VHS); Eagle Rock Entertainment (DVD)
- Director: Mike Mansfield

Electric Light Orchestra chronology
Discovery (1979)	Out of the Blue: Live at Wembley (1980)	Fusion – Live in London (1980)

Out of the Blue: Live at Wembley is a concert film by the Electric Light Orchestra.

In 1978 the band played the Wembley Arena for a record eight appearances. The opening night (a charity Gala event) was filmed in the presence of the Duke and Duchess of Gloucester and the band were introduced by US actor Tony Curtis.

The stage was a huge flying saucer with hydraulic lifts, the 'roof' would open up to reveal the band. The concert was one of the first examples of lasers used at a live rock concert. Due to the nature of the sound acoustics on the huge metal and fiberglass flying saucer shaped stage, the band had difficulty hearing their monitors and keeping time, so backing tapes were used that only the band were supposed to hear. The original TV broadcast edit in mono sound was poorly mixed from the concert and used some of the backing tapes used by the band pushed high in the mix which appeared to make the band look like they were lip-synching.

The Out of the Blue Tour or Big Night tour as it was known in the United States, became the highest-grossing concert tour of 1978, with the North American leg of the tour breaking many attendance and sales records. This concert, along with The Face the Music Tour 1976, were released as live compact discs in 1998.

== Video releases ==
It has also been released previously on VHS, Betamax and Laserdisc in 1980, VHS again in '89, then in '98 as a DVD and VHS coupled with their music video album produced for the Discovery album (for which the band never toured). As previously mentioned, the sound quality of the Wembley concert contained in some of these early releases is relatively poor, and elevates the prominence of the studio backing tapes on many tracks. In 2006, the concert master tapes were obtained and properly remixed, hence restoring the sound originally intended for the video and presented in DTS sound, at last resembling the sound that was heard by the audience. However, due to "bleed-through" some tracks like "Standin' in the Rain", "Night in the City" and "Turn To Stone", the pre-recorded backing tapes are still present, but much better subdued. A new DVD release of the concert has been scheduled with bonus material and new packaging according to the ftmusic website. A Blu-ray of the concert was released in March 2015 and featured bonus footage of various performances from other concerts.

== Full concert song list ==
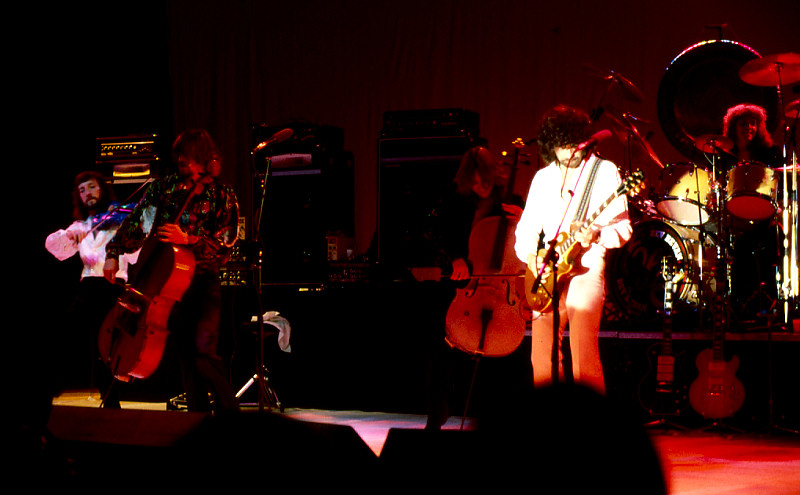
1978 Out of the Blue Tour Oslo

Below is the entire set from the concert. Tracks 5–7, 11, 13, 17, and 21 from that night have never been released on video or compact disc, the rest have appeared on the DVD.

- Introduction by Tony Curtis

1. "Introduction Theme (Sinfonia da Requiem by Benjamin Britten)"
2. "Standin' in the Rain"
3. "Night in the City"
4. "Turn to Stone"
5. "Eldorado Overture"
6. "Can't Get It Out of My Head"
7. "Hugh's Solo / Flight of the Bumblebee"
8. "Tightrope"
9. "Telephone Line"
10. "Rockaria!"
11. "Mik's Solo"/"In the Hall of the Mountain King"/"Hungarian Dance No. 5"
12. "Wild West Hero"
13. "Strange Magic"
14. "Showdown"
15. 1 Minute Talk
16. "Sweet Talkin' Woman"
17. "Evil Woman"
18. "Mr. Blue Sky"
19. "Do Ya"
20. "Livin' Thing"
21. "Ma-Ma-Ma Belle"
22. "Roll Over Beethoven"
  - Electric Light Orchestra Outroduction Theme

The 2015 Blu-ray edition contains Bonus videos featuring the following

Brunel University 1973

- King of the Universe
- Ma-Ma-Ma-Belle
- In the hall of the Mountain King
- Great Balls of Fire

Rockpalast 1974

- Daybreaker
- Showdown
- Day Tripper
- Orange Blossom Special
- Ma-Ma-Ma-Belle
- In the hall of the Mountain King
- Great Balls of Fire
- Roll over Beethoven
- Rockplast interview

Fusion 1976

- Poker
- Nightrider
- Showdown
- Eldorado Overture
- Can't Get It Out of My Head
- Poor Boy (The Greenwood)
- Illusions in G Major
- Strange Magic
- 10538 Overture
- Do Ya
- Evil Woman
- Ma-Ma-Ma-Belle
- Roll Over Beethoven

Discovery 1979

- Shine a Little Love
- Confusion
- Need Her Love
- Diary of Horace Wimp
- Last Train to London
- Midnight Blue
- Wishing
- Don't Bring Me Down

== Personnel ==
- Jeff Lynne – lead vocals, electric and acoustic guitar
- Bev Bevan – drums, percussion, backing vocals, spoken word
- Richard Tandy – keyboards, vocoder
- Kelly Groucutt – bass guitar, backing, lead, and operatic vocals
- Mik Kaminski – violin
- Hugh McDowell – cello
- Melvyn Gale – cello, piano
- Jake Commander (offstage) – backing vocals, acoustic guitar

== Certifications ==
Certifications for 2006 remastered DVD
Region	Certification	Certified units/sales
United Kingdom (BPI)	Gold	25,000^{^}
^{^} Shipments figures based on certification alone.
