= Friends & Relatives =

Friends and Relatives

Compilation album by Electric Light Orchestra
- Released: 21 September 1999
- Recorded: various
- Length: 1:46:29
- Label: Eagle Records, Purple Pyramid

Electric Light Orchestra chronology
Live at the BBC (1999)	Friends and Relatives (1999)	Flashback (2000)

Alternative cover
- US cover

Professional ratings
Review scores
Source	Rating
AllMusic	3.5/5 stars
Encyclopedia of Popular Music	3/5 stars

Friends & Relatives is a compilation album released by Eagle Records and Purple Pyramid (US) in 1999. The album features songs from various artists that have a common linkage to Electric Light Orchestra, such as The Move and Wizzard.

== Track listing ==
=== Audio CD ===
Disc 1
No.	Title	Artist	Length
1.	"Intro" (from Live at Wembley '78, 1998)	Tony Curtis	0:32
2.	"Rockaria!" (from Live at Wembley '78, 1998)	Electric Light Orchestra	2:50
3.	"Telephone Line" (from Live at Wembley '78, 1998)	Electric Light Orchestra	4:22
4.	"Are You Ready to Rock" (single, 1974)	Wizzard	2:30
5.	"Let There Be Drums" (single, 1976)	Bev Bevan	2:51
6.	"Fire Brigade" (single, 1976)	The Move	2:22
7.	"Top Ten Record" (single, 1970)	Rick Price	2:14
8.	"Custer's Last Stand" (single, 1988)	Rick Wakeman featuring Roy Wood	4:03
9.	"In Time" (from Reborn, 1996)	Denny Laine	5:34
10.	"Someday" (single b-side, 1982)	Carl Wayne	3:58
11.	"Clog Dance" (single, 1979)	Violinski	3:02
12.	"Under the Blue/Asteroid" (from Earthrise, 1986)	Tandy Morgan	3:15
13.	"Any Old Time Will Do" (single, 1976)	Roy Wood	4:15
14.	"Evil Woman" (from Live at Winterland '76, 1998)	Electric Light Orchestra	4:14
15.	"10538 Overture"/"Do Ya" (from Live at Winterland '76, 1998)	Electric Light Orchestra	4:44

Disc 2
No.	Title	Artist	Length
1.	"Mr. Blue Sky" (from Live at Wembley '78, 1998)	Electric Light Orchestra	3:46
2.	"Livin' Thing" (from Live at Wembley '78, 1998)	Electric Light Orchestra	4:20
3.	"Flowers in the Rain" (single, 1967)	The Move	2:24
4.	"Rock 'n' Roll Winter (Loony's Tune)" (single, 1974)	Wizzard	5:04
5.	"Bitter Sweet" (from This Is to Certify, 1970)	Rick Price	2:42
6.	"Pictures in My Pillow" (from Earthrise, 1986)	Tandy Morgan	4:03
7.	"Heavy Head" (single b-side, 1976)	Bev Bevan	3:31
8.	"Miss You Nights" (single, 1982)	Carl Wayne with Choral Union	3:12
9.	"Eternal Quest" (from Reborn, 1996)	Denny Laine	5:28
10.	"Ria" (from Earthrise, 1986)	Tandy Morgan	2:51
11.	"This Is The Story of My Love (Baby)" (single, 1974)	Wizzard	4:10
12.	"Oh What a Shame" (single, 1975)	Roy Wood	3:50
13.	"Blackberry Way" (single, 1968)	The Move	3:34
14.	"Roll Over Beethoven" (from Live at Winterland '76, 1998)	Electric Light Orchestra	6:48
Total length:			1:46:29
