= Live at Wembley '78 =

Live album by Electric Light Orchestra
- Released: 28 March 1998
- Recorded: June 1978
- Genre: Rock
- Length: 56:19
- Label: Eagle
- Producer: Jeff Lynne

Electric Light Orchestra chronology
Light Years, The Very Best of Electric Light Orchestra (1997)	Live at Wembley '78 (1998)	Live at Winterland '76 (1998)

Professional ratings
Review scores
Source	Rating
AllMusic	2.5/5 stars
Encyclopedia of Popular Music	3/5 stars

Live at Wembley '78 is a live recording by Electric Light Orchestra (ELO). Edited in length as was the VHS/DVD version.

== Sound issues ==
The sound on this album has led to accusations of the band lip syncing, as did the earlier video from which this CD was taken. However it has come to light that the sound used on the television broadcast of the Out of the Blue Concert in 1978 was a poorly mixed effort in mono sound that used a lot of the backing tapes that were used admittedly by the band due to sound problems caused by the huge metal and fibreglass stage set. The tapes were for the band's ears only, to help them keep time and should not have been heard by the audience.

In 2006 Eagle Rock Entertainment remastered the original sound tapes from the concert and presented the sound in stereo for the first time ever on DVD removing the over dubbed sound that was obvious on some tracks. So far no upgraded CD version has been released.

== Track listing ==
All songs written by Jeff Lynne except track 15, written by Chuck Berry.

1. Introduction (Tony Curtis) – 2:48
2. "Standin' in the Rain" – 3:37
3. "Night in the City" – 3:52
4. "Turn to Stone" – 3:54
5. "Tightrope" – 4:35
6. "Telephone Line" – 4:19
7. "Rockaria!" – 2:53
8. "Wild West Hero" – 3:10
9. "Showdown" – 3:14
10. 1 Minute Talk (Bev Bevan) – 0.55
11. "Sweet Talkin' Woman" – 3:53
12. "Mr. Blue Sky" – 3:39
13. "Do Ya" – 4:46
14. "Livin' Thing" – 3:58
15. "Roll Over Beethoven" – 6:46

== Personnel ==
- Jeff Lynne – Vocals, Guitar
- Bev Bevan – Drums
- Richard Tandy – Keyboards
- Kelly Groucutt – Bass, Vocals
- Mik Kaminski – Violin
- Hugh McDowell – Cello
- Melvyn Gale – Cello
- Jake Commander – Backing vocals, acoustic guitar
