= Showdown (Electric Light Orchestra album) =

Compilation album by Electric Light Orchestra
- Released: November 1974
- Recorded: 1971–1973
- Genre: Progressive rock
- Label: Harvest
- Producer: Roy Wood; Jeff Lynne

Electric Light Orchestra chronology
Eldorado (1974)	Showdown (1974)	Face the Music (1975)

Professional ratings
Review scores
Source	Rating
MusicHound	2.5/5

Showdown is an Electric Light Orchestra (ELO) compilation album, covering their Harvest Records years. It is the first in a very long line of Electric Light Orchestra compilation albums. It comprises four tracks from their debut album and three from ELO 2 as well as the hit single "Showdown", the first time it had featured on an album in the UK.

== Track listing ==
Side one

#	Title	Writer	Album	Length
1	"10538 Overture"	Jeff Lynne	The Electric Light Orchestra (1971), issued in the US in 1972 under the title No Answer	5:28
2	"From the Sun to the World (Boogie No.1)"	Jeff Lynne	ELO 2 (1973)	8:15
3	"Whisper in the Night"	Roy Wood	The Electric Light Orchestra (1971), issued in the US in 1972 under the title No Answer	4:44
4	"Queen of the Hours"	Jeff Lynne	The Electric Light Orchestra (1971), issued in the US in 1972 under the title No Answer	3:21

Side two

#	Title	Writer	Album	Length
1	"Roll Over Beethoven"	Chuck Berry / Ludwig van Beethoven	ELO 2 (1973)	7:00
2	"First Movement (Jumping Biz)"	Roy Wood	The Electric Light Orchestra (1971), issued in the US in 1972 under the title No Answer	2:57
3	"In Old England Town (Boogie No 2)"	Jeff Lynne	ELO 2 (1973)	6:50
4	"Showdown"	Jeff Lynne	1973 non-album single, later included in the US version of the album On the Third Day (1973)	4:08

== Personnel ==
- Jeff Lynne – vocals, guitars, piano, Moog synthesizer
- Roy Wood – vocals, guitar, bass, cello, wind instruments
- Bev Bevan – drums, percussion
- Richard Tandy – piano, keyboards, Moog synthesizer
- Mike de Albuquerque – bass guitar, backing vocals
- Wilfred Gibson – violin
- Mike Edwards – cello
- Colin Walker – cello
- Bill Hunt – French horn, hunting horn
- Steve Woolam – violin
