= Live at Winterland '76 =

Live album by Electric Light Orchestra
- Released: 30 March 1998
- Recorded: February 1976
- Genre: Rock
- Length: 60:34
- Label: Eagle
- Producer: Jeff Lynne

Electric Light Orchestra chronology
Live at Wembley '78 (1998)	Live at Winterland '76 (1998)	Definitive Collection (1999)

Professional ratings
Review scores
Source	Rating
AllMusic	4/5 stars
Encyclopedia of Popular Music	3/5 stars

Live at Winterland '76 is a live album by the Electric Light Orchestra (ELO). It was released in 1998.

Recorded in 1976 during the band's Face the Music Tour, this album, along with 1974's The Night the Light Went On in Long Beach are two official releases of the band performing live. Bassist and backing vocalist Kelly Groucutt features prominently, taking over lead vocal duty on several tracks that do not feature him in this capacity in their studio forms. The album also gives the listener a rare opportunity to hear the "Eldorado Suite" performed live (although "Poorboy (The Greenwood)" was edited out of the Suite on this release), plus a live version of The Move's only US hit "Do Ya" before it was re-recorded by the band for their 1976 album A New World Record. This album also excises two instrumental soloes originally performed during the show: a cello solo by Hugh McDowell and a violin solo by Mik Kaminski.

== Track listing ==
All tracks are written by Jeff Lynne, with the exception of Roll Over Beethoven by Chuck Berry.

No.	Title	Length
1.	"Fire on High"	5:28
2.	"Poker"	4:02
3.	"Nightrider"	4:37
4.	"Showdown"	4:43
5.	"Eldorado Suite (Including Can't Get It Out of My Head)"	13:14
6.	"Strange Magic"	5:07
7.	"Medley: 10538 Overture" / "Do Ya"	5:27
8.	"Evil Woman"	4:39
9.	"Ma-Ma-Ma Belle"	6:37
10.	"Roll Over Beethoven"	6:38
Total length:		60:34

== Personnel ==
- Jeff Lynne – lead and backing vocals, guitar
- Bev Bevan – drums, percussion, backing vocals
- Richard Tandy – piano, keyboards
- Kelly Groucutt – bass guitar, backing and lead vocals
- Mik Kaminski – violin
- Hugh McDowell – cello
- Melvyn Gale – cello, piano
