= The Very Best of Electric Light Orchestra =

The Very Best of Electric Light Orchestra may refer to:

- The Very Best of the Electric Light Orchestra, 1994
- Light Years, The Very Best of Electric Light Orchestra, 1997
- All Over the World: The Very Best of Electric Light Orchestra, 2005
- Mr. Blue Sky: The Very Best of Electric Light Orchestra, 2012
