= Grieg's Piano Concerto in A Minor (song) =

Song by Electric Light Orchestra

from the album Flashback
- Released: 2000
- Recorded: 1982 (started); 2000 (finished)
- Genre: Rock
- Length: 2:58
- Label: Epic Records
- Songwriter(s): Edvard Grieg
- Producer(s): Jeff Lynne

"Grieg's Piano Concerto in A Minor" is an abbreviation of a piano concerto written by Edvard Grieg and performed by Electric Light Orchestra on the box set Flashback.

Originally this was just a sound check at Wisseloord Studios, Hilversum, the Netherlands prior to recording the album Secret Messages with Richard Tandy on piano and Jeff Lynne on drums, finished in 2000 and included on the box set. This was the second time Lynne had adapted one of Grieg's works, the other being "In the Hall of the Mountain King" in 1973.
