= The Night the Light Went On in Long Beach =

Live album by Electric Light Orchestra
- Released: 30 May 1974
- Recorded: 12 May 1974
- Venues: Long Beach Auditorium, Long Beach, California
- Genre: Progressive rock
- Length: 40:20
- Label: Warner Bros.
- Producer: Jeff Lynne

Electric Light Orchestra chronology
On the Third Day (1973)	The Night the Light Went On in Long Beach (1974)	Eldorado (1974)

Alternative cover
- Reissue album cover

Professional ratings
Review scores
Source	Rating
AllMusic	4.5/5 stars
Encyclopedia of Popular Music	2/5 stars
MusicHound	2/5

The Night the Light Went On in Long Beach is a 1974 live album by the Electric Light Orchestra (ELO) recorded on the evening of 12 May 1974 at the Long Beach Auditorium in Long Beach, California; its title lampoons "The Night the Lights Went Out in Georgia" by Vicki Lawrence.

== Background and limited release ==
This live album was intended as the follow-up to On the Third Day, but the original recording was marred by technical issues both on and off the stage. The problems started when the truck carrying the band's equipment broke down en route to the venue, and the band did not have enough time to perform a proper soundcheck before the concert.

Initial vinyl pressings of the album were of such poor quality that ELO's management eventually filed a lawsuit against the production company for compensation. The garish gatefold sleeve of the original album, designed by Mick Haggerty, showed a cartoony 1950s-era horror film mob running in terror from an unseen source of light, with the album's title scrawled across the sleeve. The inside held distorted photos of the band performing onstage.

Ultimately, both ELO's UK and US labels decided against issuing The Night the Light Went On in Long Beach. It only achieved "legitimate" release in European countries including Germany, France and Italy, as well as handful of other countries such as Australia, New Zealand and South Africa although it was eventually issued in the UK in 1985. It was never released in the US (although it was heavily imported into the US, and sold quite well in the specialty rock music shops around the country). However, in the US, the live version of "10538 Overture" from this recording was later used as the B-side for the ELO single "Evil Woman" from the studio album Face the Music. The live version of "Roll Over Beethoven" from Long Beach saw limited release in the US on the B-side of the alternate version of "Telephone Line" in the CBS Hall of Fame 45 re-issue series.

== Restoration ==
A 1990s CD remastering and reissue corrected the poor sound quality of the original album and restored several songs to their full-length versions. It was discovered that the original LP pressing had been mastered using an inferior copy of the concert (according to the CD's liner notes, the tape used had been marked 'Rough Mix, Do Not Use'), hence its muddy sound. However, the original master tape was discovered in the record company's vault, and the album was restored to its intended sound quality.

The album is notable for being the sole live recording of ELO released during their initial period of activity.

== Original track listing ==
Side 1
No.	Title	Writer(s)	Length
1.	"Daybreaker"	Jeff Lynne	5:34
2.	"Showdown"	Lynne	6:54
3.	"Day Tripper"	Lennon–McCartney	6:40

Side 2
No.	Title	Writer(s)	Length
4.	"10538 Overture"	Lynne	5:44
5.	"Mik's Solo/Orange Blossom Special"	Mik Kaminski/Ervin T. Rouse	2:28
6.	"In the Hall of the Mountain King/Great Balls of Fire"	Edvard Grieg/Jack Hammer, Otis Blackwell	8:35
7.	"Roll Over Beethoven"	Chuck Berry	4:25
Total length:			40:20

== Personnel ==
- Jeff Lynne – lead vocals, electric guitar
- Bev Bevan – drums
- Richard Tandy – Wurlitzer electric piano, Minimoog synthesizer
- Mike de Albuquerque – co-lead vocals, bass, backing vocals
- Mik Kaminski – violin
- Hugh McDowell – cello
- Mike Edwards – cello
