= Kuiama =

Song by Electric Light Orchestra

from the album ELO 2
- Released: 1973
- Recorded: 1972, Air Studios, London, England
- Genre: Progressive rock
- Length: 11:19
- Label: Harvest Records
- Songwriter: Jeff Lynne
- Producer: Jeff Lynne

ELO 2 track listing
- 5 tracks Side one: 1. "In Old England Town (Boogie No. 2)"; 2. "Momma"; 3. "Roll Over Beethoven"; Side two: 4. "From the Sun to the World (Boogie No. 1)"; 5. "Kuiama"

"Kuiama" is a song written by Jeff Lynne and performed by Electric Light Orchestra. Singer Jeff Lynne pronounces it 'Key-AH-ma'.

The song is the last track of the ELO 2 LP. At 11:19, it is the longest track on the album, and the longest song ever recorded by Electric Light Orchestra. It tells the tale of a soldier and an orphan girl. The soldier is trying to comfort the girl and also to explain how he was the one who killed her parents.

Although not released as a single, the song has been included on compilation albums, such as Olé ELO, Afterglow and The Light Shines On Vol 2, and has been performed live. It was also a favourite of the ELO band members at the time.
