= Earthrise (album) =

1985 studio album by Richard Tandy and David Morgan

Studio album by Richard Tandy and David Morgan
- Released: 1985
- Recorded: 1981–1983
- Studio: Ridge Farm, Sussex, England; RJ Jones, London, England; Chipping Norton, Oxford, England; Jarm East, London, England; Grimm Doo West, Birmingham, England
- Genre: Rock
- Length: 44:58
- Label: FM-Revolver (UK); Straight Ahead (US)
- Producer: Dave Morgan, Richard Tandy, Steve Lipson

Richard Tandy and David Morgan chronology
Earthrise (1985)	The B.C. Collection (1987)

2011 Special Edition

Earthrise is a concept album originally released in 1985 in the UK (USA 1984), written by former Electric Light Orchestra (ELO) member Richard Tandy and David Morgan, both from Birmingham, UK. Morgan also wrote songs for 1960s band The Move. The album was inspired by the iconic photo of the Earth taken by astronaut William Anders during the 1968 Apollo 8 mission.

The album's story is about a space explorer who longs to return to his one love on Earth, only to eventually find that true love has always been with him — inside. The album's synthesizer-heavy rock sound is similar to ELO's 1981 album Time. Although the album was well received by ELO fans, it was not a commercial success, largely due to the absence of marketing. Rock Legacy released a remastered special edition on CD in 2011.

On November 9, 2019, to commemorate the 50th year of the Moon landings, the Royal Birmingham Conservatoire performed an orchestral version of Earthrise with Tandy and Morgan.

== Track listing ==
The track order of the original 1986 release, on LP and cassette with the FMRevolver label, is:

=== Original track listing ===
Side one
No.	Title	Length
1.	"Earth Rise"	2:06
2.	"Under the Blue"	1:17
3.	"Asteroid"	1:57
4.	"Suddenly"	3:34
5.	"Escape from the Citadel"	2:47
6.	"Caesar of the Galaxy"	2:44
7.	"One Thousand Worlds"	3:30
8.	"Spaceship Earth"	4:35

Side two
No.	Title	Length
1.	"Zero Zero"	3:07
2.	"The Third Planet"	2:33
3.	"Ria"	2:48
4.	"Princeton"	6:00
5.	"Pictures in My Pillow"	4:00
6.	"The Secret"	3:54
Total length:		44:58

=== CD issue ===
The remastered CD, released on 18 August 2011, contains the following tracks, some of which are previously unreleased or bonus.

No.	Title	Length
1.	"Spaceship Earth"	4:32
2.	"Earth Rise"	1:52
3.	"Under the Blue" / "Asteroid"	3:12
4.	"Starclipse" / "Purpose"	3:36
5.	"Escape from the Citadel"	2:45
6.	"One Thousand Worlds"	4:01
7.	"The Third Planet"	2:29
8.	"Suddenly"	3:32
9.	"Princeton"	5:21
10.	"Wheels"	2:05
11.	"Caesar of the Galaxy"	3:00
12.	"The Secret"	3:49
13.	"Zero Zero" (plus 29 seconds of silence added)	3:07
Total length:		40:09

Additional tracks
No.	Title	Length
14.	"Pictures in My Pillow"	4:03
15.	"Ria" (instrumental + backing vocals)	3:11
16.	"Starclipse" (outmix)	2:59

== Personnel ==
Personnel list according to the 1986 reissue liner notes.

Earthrise

- Richard Tandy – keyboards, bass guitar, guitar, producer
- Dave Morgan – keyboards, vocoder, vocals, guitar, producer
- Haydon James Simpson / Jim Simpson – drums, guitar, on "Zero Zero"
- Tony Clarkin – guitar on "Ria"
- Bob Wilson – guitar
- Martin Smith – guitar on Secret (uncredited on re-issue)
- Shirley Miller – backing vocals on "Princeton"
- Carl Wayne – vocals on "Princeton"
- Kevin Peek – guitar on "Princeton"
- Richard Bailey – keyboards, guitar on "Princeton"
- Graham Preskett – keyboards, string arrangements on "Princeton"
- David Bellinger – keyboards on "Spaceship Earth"
- Brian Badhams – bass guitar on "Princeton"
- Mike Giles – drums on "Princeton"

Production

- Stephen Lipson – engineer, producer
- Chris Bellman – mastering

== Release history ==
Release dates and formats for Earthrise
Region	Date	Format(s)	Label	Ref.
United States	1984	Unknown	Unknown	
United Kingdom	1985	LP, Cassette	FM-Revolver	
United States	1986	LP, Cassette	Straight Ahead	
United Kingdom	1992	CD	Prestige Records	
United Kingdom	18 August 2011	CD	Rock Legacy	
United States	24 July 2020	CD	Prestige Elite	
