= Lloyd Ziff =

American photographer and art director (1942–2024)

- Born: September 27, 1942; Detroit, Michigan, U.S.
- Died: August 1, 2024 (aged 81); Orient Point, New York, U.S.
- Occupations: Photographer, art director

== Early Life ==
Lloyd Ziff (September 27, 1942–August 1, 2024) was an American photographer and art director known for his work on influential magazines such as Vanity Fair, House & Garden, Rolling Stone, and Condé Nast Traveler.

Ziff was born in Detroit, Michigan, the only child of Frances (Maimes) Ziff and Max Ziff, an upholsterer. His father died when he was five, and he moved with his mother to Los Angeles. He graduated from Beverly Hills High School and earned a Bachelor of Fine Arts from Pratt Institute in 1967.

== Career ==
Ziffs love for art began In High School where he was the best artist in his class. He had a love for magazines and design and planned to go to college in New York.

In 1968, Ziff photographed art school classmates Robert Mapplethorpe and Patti Smith in their Brooklyn apartment. His early black-and-white portraits captured intimate, formative moments before both would rise to fame.

Ziff began in the design department at McCall's magazine and then moved to CBS Records, designing album covers, including the 1972 reissue of Bessie Smith: The Empress, which earned him a Grammy nomination. In the 1970s, he worked at Rolling Stone and Playgirl and helped launch New West, the West Coast sister publication of New York magazine.

He later worked for The New York Times Magazine, House & Garden, and Vanity Fair, where he oversaw visually striking covers and layouts. Ziff was known for his emphasis on photography, often commissioning photographers such as Sheila Metzner and Bridgette Lacombe, catapulting their careers and trusting them with creative freedom. Ziff later produced three issues of a magazine for Starbucks as a freelance photographer, called Joe.

Ziff showcased his photography at multiple different galleries including Robin Rice Gallery in 2002 and 2006, Earl McGrath Gallery in 2003 and 2004, Danziger Gallery in 2013, and Galerie Claude Samuel in 2018.

Ziff died on August 1, 2024, at his home in Orient Point, New York, at the age of 81.

== Facts and Accomplishments ==
1. He admired youth. He first became known for his photos that captured youth.
2. He used photography as a way to relate to and understand people, "Although we weren't particularly close, Mr. Ziff said, I believe we recognized in each other something that couldn't be captured with words."
3. His first job was in the design department of McCall’s magazine. He stayed there for about a year before moving to CBS Records, where he designed album covers. He was nominated for a Grammy for the 1972 reissue “Bessie Smith: The Empress.”
4. He then moved onto working for Playgirl in '75. That is where he helped launch New West magazine, New York magazine's West Coast sister.
5. He spent the rest of the 70s working for all the magazine's listed under "Career."
6. He had moved on from photography to Art Direction by the 90s, during that time he worked for The New York Times Magazine and then House & Garden, a Condé Nast publication that he helped transform from a crafty D.I.Y. service magazine into an elegant portfolio of luxurious interiors with essays by literary lions like Elizabeth Hardwick and Rosamond Bernier.
7. In 1999, he had a heart attack and made him realize he needed to go back to photography, what he truly loved, before it was too late.
8. He met his Husband, Stephen Kelemen in 1979, they married in 2008. They had 2 adopted children, Pond and Chandra.
9. He loved cars and car culture, and he owned a black Porsche 914.
10. The camera he used to capture dynamic streetscapes and portraits was a 35-millimeter Leica.
