= ELO 2 =

1973 studio album by Electric Light Orchestra

- UK cover

Studio album by The Electric Light Orchestra
- Released: March 1973
- Recorded: May–October 1972
- Studios: AIR Studios, London
- Genre: Progressive rock
- Length: 41:48
- Labels: Harvest, United Artists
- Producer: Jeff Lynne

The Electric Light Orchestra chronology
The Electric Light Orchestra (1971)	ELO 2 (1973)	On the Third Day (1973)

Singles from ELO 2
- 1. "Roll Over Beethoven" Released: 12 January 1973

US cover

ELO 2 is the second studio album by the Electric Light Orchestra (ELO), released in 1973. In the US, the album was released as Electric Light Orchestra II. It was the band's last album to be released by the Harvest label, the last (in the UK) on which the band used the definite article The in their name, and the one that introduced their abbreviated name 'ELO'.

== Background and recording ==
The album was originally to be titled The Lost Planet, but that concept was quietly dropped. During the initial recording sessions, Roy Wood left the band and formed Wizzard in June 1972, taking Bill Hunt and touring cellist Hugh McDowell with him. Although uncredited at the time, Wood performed on two tracks, playing cello and bass on "In Old England Town" and "From the Sun to the World". Classically trained cellist Colin Walker replaced Wood, and Wilfred Gibson played violin. Richard Tandy made his ELO studio debut on this album, playing keyboards; he had earlier performed live with the original lineup alongside Wood, Gibson, co-frontman Jeff Lynne, drummer Bev Bevan and cellist Mike Edwards, playing bass (and in TV appearances with the Move playing guitar). Bassist and vocalist Mike de Albuquerque also made his ELO studio debut on the album. All five pieces are longer than standard rock songs, and feature multi-layered orchestral instruments that create a dense, complex sound.

== Critical reception ==
Professional ratings
Review scores
Source	Rating
AllMusic	2.5/5 stars
Christgau's Record Guide	C+
Classic Rock	2/5 stars
Encyclopedia of Popular Music	2/5 stars
MusicHound	2.5/5
The Rolling Stone Album Guide	2/5 stars
The Daily Vault	A

ELO 2 received mixed reviews from critics. AllMusic's Bruce Eder says "the album holds up well, and it and the single did go a long way toward getting them the beginnings of an audience in America." The Daily Vault says "After hearing ELO II, not only would some of these rock fans take another look at ELO's music in another sense, they just might do the same for Classical Music as well."

== Release ==
Harvest released ELO 2 in March 1973. Along with its predecessor, ELO 2 is the least commercial-sounding album the band released, although it reached the British Top 40 album chart, whereas its more concise follow-up, On the Third Day, did not.

One song from the album was released as a single, their cover of Chuck Berry`s "Roll Over Beethoven". The edit of that song (4:32) was a top 10 hit in Britain, and also received radio airplay in America. The song is also a concert staple.

The British and American sleeves differed, as did the title; in the UK it was released in a gatefold sleeve titled ELO 2 with a painting of a light bulb travelling through space with the wording 'ELO2' on the base of the bulb, while in the US the cover featured a more ornate light bulb against a night sky and was titled Electric Light Orchestra II. For reasons unknown, "Roll Over Beethoven" was slightly edited in length compared with its US counterpart. Track 2 "Momma" was Americanized to "Mama" for the US release. An instrumental version of "In Old England Town", the opening track, became the B-side to the single "Showdown". The album contains the band's longest track, the anti-war song "Kuiama".

In 2006 the album was remastered and expanded in the US, with a slightly different running order to the UK 2003 EMI version, with both versions sharing the same Hipgnosis album art for the first time.

== Original track listing ==
All tracks are written by Jeff Lynne, unless otherwise noted.

Side one
No.	Title	Writer(s)	Length
1.	"In Old England Town (Boogie No. 2)"		6:56
2.	"Momma" (retitled "Mama" on US edition)		7:03
3.	"Roll Over Beethoven" (Chuck Berry cover)	Chuck Berry, Ludwig van Beethoven	8:09 (Note: In the UK and Japanese releases it lasts 7:03)

Side two
No.	Title	Length
4.	"From the Sun to the World (Boogie No. 1)"	8:20
5.	"Kuiama"	11:19
Total length:		41:47

US 2006 reissue bonus tracks
No.	Title	Writer(s)	Length
6.	"In Old England Town (Instrumental)" (B-side to the Showdown single)		2:43
7.	"Baby, I Apologise" (session outtake)		3:43
8.	"In Old England Town" (take 1, alternate mix)		6:56
9.	"Roll Over Beethoven" (take 1)	Berry	8:15

== ELO 2 (First Light Series) ==
ELO 2 (First Light Series)

Studio album by Electric Light Orchestra
- Released: 2003
- Recorded: 1972–73
- Studios: AIR Studios, London
- Genres: Progressive rock; symphonic rock
- Length: 2:04:07
- Labels: Harvest, EMI
- Producer: Jeff Lynne

Electric Light Orchestra chronology
The Electric Light Orchestra (First Light Series) (2001)	ELO 2 (First Light Series) (2003)	The Essential Electric Light Orchestra (2003)

Professional ratings
Review scores
Source	Rating
Allmusic	4/5 stars

ELO 2 (First light Series) is an expanded 30th Anniversary edition of Electric Light Orchestra's second album.

The second in the EMI First Light Series released in 2003 to mark the album's 30th anniversary. The first five tracks comprise the original ELO 2 album with the rest of the CD dedicated to the new material recorded for the future third album. The second disc utilises the original album's working title The Lost Planet, and features various live recordings, outtakes and rarities, in addition to the songs recorded with Carl Wayne, the original Move lead singer.

Tracks 6–8 on disc two were recorded in February 1973, and features Carl Wayne.

Tracks 9–12 on disc one were recorded in April 1973 and features glam rock superstar Marc Bolan, who was also recording at AIR Studios at that time, on double lead guitar on tracks 10–12. The band re-recorded two of these songs for the third album because of ELO's label change in the UK before it was released.

Tracks 6–8 on disc one and track 5 on disc two were recorded in June 1973.

Tracks recorded for the third album On the Third Day from disc one were later used as bonus tracks on its 2006 reissue edition.

An abriged version of the 30th anniversary edition of ELO 2 that excluded BBC sessions tracks was released digitally as the Deluxe edition.

All songs written by Jeff Lynne except where noted.

Disc one — ELO 2
No.	Title	Writer(s)	Length
1.	"In Old England Town (Boogie No. 2)"		6:56
2.	"Momma..."		7:03
3.	"Roll Over Beethoven"	Berry	8:09
4.	"From the Sun to the World (Boogie No. 1)"		8:20
5.	"Kuiama"		11:19

Bonus tracks
No.	Title	Writer(s)	Length
6.	"Showdown"		4:11
7.	"In Old England Town (Instrumental)" (B-side of "Showdown" single)		2:43
8.	"Baby I Apologise" (session outtake, 1 June 1973)		3:42
9.	"Auntie" (Ma-Ma-Ma Belle Take 1)		1:19
10.	"Auntie" (Ma-Ma-Ma Belle Take 2)		4:03
11.	"Mambo" (Dreaming of 4000 Take 1)		5:02
12.	"Everyone's Born to Die"		4:40
13.	"Roll Over Beethoven" (Take 1)	Berry	8:15

- Tracks 9–13 previously unreleased.

Disc two — The Lost Planet
No.	Title	Writer(s)	Length
1.	"Brian Matthew Introduces ELO"		0:22
2.	"From the Sun to the World (Boogie No. 1)" (BBC Session)		7:25
3.	"Momma" (BBC Session)		6:57
4.	"Roll Over Beethoven" (single version)	Berry	4:35
5.	"Showdown" (Take 1)		4:14
6.	"Your World" (Take 2)		4:55
7.	"Get a Hold of Myself" (Take 2)		4:43
8.	"Mama" (Take 1)		4:59
9.	"Wilf's Solo" (instrumental)	Wilfred Gibson	3:39
10.	"Roll Over Beethoven" (BBC Session)	Berry	7:40

- Lead vocals on tracks 6–8 by Carl Wayne.
- BBC Session material recorded at BBC Langham Studio 1, 1 November 1972.

== Personnel ==
Personnel according to the gatefold.

- Jeff Lynne – lead vocals, guitars, Moog synthesizer
- Bev Bevan – drums, percussion
- Richard Tandy – piano, harmonium, Moog synthesizer, guitar, backing vocals
- Mike de Albuquerque – bass and backing vocals (on “Momma”, “Roll Over Beethoven”, and “Kuiama”)
- Mike Edwards – cello
- Wilf Gibson – violin
- Colin Walker – cello (on “Momma”, “Roll Over Beethoven”, and “Kuiama”)
- Roy Wood – bass and cello (on “In Old England Town (Boogie No. 2)” and “From the Sun to the World (Boogie No. 1)”)

Unconfirmed musicians

- Hugh McDowell – possible cello (on “In Old England Town (Boogie No. 2)” and “From the Sun to the World (Boogie No. 1)”)
- Bill Hunt – French horn (on “From the Sun to the World (Boogie No. 1)”) and possible keyboards (on “In Old England Town (Boogie No. 2)”)

Additional personnel

- Marc Bolan – guitar on ELO 2 tracks 10–12
- Carl Wayne – lead vocals on The Lost Planet tracks 6–8

Production

- Jeff Lynne – producer
- Marty Evans – photography
- Al Vandenburg – photography
- Mike Salisbury – art direction
- Lloyd Ziff – design

== Charts ==
Chart (1973)	Peak position
Canada Top Albums/CDs (RPM)	17
UK Albums (Official Charts)	35
US Billboard 200	62
US CashBox	53

== Release history ==
Region	Date	Version
United Kingdom	March 1973	Original vinyl
United States	March 1973	Original vinyl
United Kingdom	January 2003	30th Anniversary edition
United States	28 March 2006	Expanded remaster
