= Colin Walker (cellist) =

- Born: 8 July 1949 (age 77); Minchinhampton, Gloucestershire, England
- Origin: Minchinhampton, England
- Genres: Rock music
- Occupation: Musician
- Instrument: Cello
- Label: Harvest Records
- Formerly of: Electric Light Orchestra

Colin Walker (born 8 July 1949) is an English cellist who played with Electric Light Orchestra (ELO) from 1972 to 1973.

He was born in Minchinhampton, Gloucestershire, and was educated at Marling School in Stroud and the Royal Academy of Music in London. By his own admission, his greatest regret was not playing on The Beatles' "Eleanor Rigby".

Walker was recruited into ELO after founding member Roy Wood quit the band and took cellist Hugh McDowell and horn player/keyboardist Bill Hunt with him and also joining at the time on bass was Mike de Albuquerque. Their new bandmates were singer/songwriter/guitarist/bandleader Jeff Lynne, drummer Bev Bevan, keyboardist Richard Tandy (who had previously played bass, but switched to keyboards), violinist Wilf Gibson and cellist Mike Edwards and, at the time, Walker lived in a bachelor flat in the London suburb of Queen's Park.

During his time in ELO, Walker played cello on two of their albums – ELO 2 and side two of On the Third Day – and he used a German-made cello with steel strings. He also contributed cello to the single Showdown.

After leaving ELO, Walker joined the orchestra at the Royal Opera House in Covent Garden, London. He played cello on "Fool's Gold", a track on the album Thought Talk by the rock band Starry Eyed and Laughing

Walker has also worked as a teacher.
