= On the Third Day =

1973 Electric Light Orchestra album

Studio album by Electric Light Orchestra
- Released: November 1973
- Recorded: April–May, August 1973
- Studios: De Lane Lea Studios, London; AIR Studios, London
- Genres: Progressive rock; progressive pop
- Length: 39:34
- Labels: Warner Bros. (U.K.); United Artists (U.S.)
- Producer: Jeff Lynne

Electric Light Orchestra chronology
ELO 2 (1973)	On the Third Day (1973)	The Night the Light Went On in Long Beach (1974)

Singles from On the Third Day
- 1. "Showdown" Released: 14 September 1973; 2. "Ma-Ma-Ma Belle" Released: February 1974

US cover

Professional ratings
Review scores
Source	Rating
AllMusic	3.5/5 stars
Encyclopedia of Popular Music	4/5 stars
The Music Box	3/5 stars
MusicHound	3/5
Rolling Stone	(unfavourable)
The Rolling Stone Album Guide	3/5 stars

On the Third Day is the third studio album by Electric Light Orchestra (ELO), and the first to be recorded without input from Roy Wood. It was released in the United States in November 1973 by United Artists Records, and in the United Kingdom on 14 December 1973 by Warner Bros. Records. From this album on, the word The was dropped from the band's name (other than The Night the Light Went On in Long Beach which was one of their live albums). The album was reissued on 12 September 2006.

== Release ==
On the Third Day was released in 1973 and failed to enter the UK charts at the time, although it did reach the US charts at number 52. Side two of the album was recorded during or shortly after the sessions for ELO's second album ELO 2. On The Third Day contains shorter tracks than its predecessor, but the four songs on side one of the album were linked into a continuous suite. Violinist Mik Kaminski made his debut on side one of this album, replacing Wilfred Gibson, although Gibson plays on side two (plus the bonus tracks). Also, cellist Colin Walker left the line up around the same time, leaving Mike Edwards as lone cellist.

"Showdown" was originally intended to be released only as a single, and, because it was on a different label (Harvest) than the UK album, "Showdown" did not appear on the Warner Bros. Records issue. It was, however, included on the U.S. version of the album, because the band remained on United Artists Records in the U.S. Some copies of On the Third Day from this period had "Showdown" as the last track on side one. Although he didn't record on the album, Hugh McDowell did appear on this front cover of the U.S. album seen at right, which was an unusual photograph taken by photographer Richard Avedon that had ELO displaying their navels.

== Track listing ==
=== Original track listing ===
All tracks are written by Jeff Lynne, except where noted.

Side one
No.	Title	Length
1.	"Ocean Breakup / King of the Universe"	4:05
2.	"Bluebird Is Dead"	4:25
3.	"Oh No Not Susan"	2:52
4.	"New World Rising / Ocean Breakup (Reprise)"	4:40
5.	"Showdown" (only on the original US release and subsequent reissues)	4:15

Side two
No.	Title	Writer(s)	Length
6.	"Daybreaker"		3:50
7.	"Ma-Ma-Ma Belle"		3:52
8.	"Dreaming of 4000" (listed as "I'm Only Dreaming" on the cassette tape version)		5:00
9.	"In the Hall of the Mountain King"	Edvard Grieg	6:35
Total length:			39:34

Bonus tracks on 2006 reissue
No.	Title	Length
10.	"Auntie" (Ma-Ma-Ma Belle Take 1)	1:19
11.	"Auntie" (Ma-Ma-Ma Belle Take 2)	4:05
12.	"Mambo" (Dreaming of 4000 Take 1)	5:05
13.	"Everyone's Born to Die"	3:43
14.	"Interludes"	3:40

== Personnel ==
- Jeff Lynne – vocals, guitars
- Bev Bevan – drums, percussion
- Richard Tandy – piano, Moog, clavinet, Wurlitzer electric piano
- Mike de Albuquerque – bass, backing vocals
- Mike Edwards – cello
- Mik Kaminski – violin (on tracks 1–4)
- Ted Blight – cello (credited on the UK pressing, but said to be a figment of Lynne's imagination)

=== Additional personnel ===
- Wilf Gibson – violin (on tracks 5–14)
- Colin Walker – cello (on tracks 5–14)
- Marc Bolan – co-lead guitar ("Ma Ma Ma Belle", "Dreaming of 4000", "Everyone's Born to Die")

== Charts ==
Chart (1974)	Peak position
Australian Albums (Kent Music Report)	46
Canada Top Albums/CDs (RPM)	40
US Billboard 200	52
US CashBox	31

Chart (2006)	Peak position
ERROR in "Oricon": Invalid position: 289. Expected number 1–200 or dash (–).^{[A]}

Notes

- A Peaked the week of 20 October 2006 when Epic Records Japan released the remastered CD.
