= Ma-Ma-Ma Belle =

Single by Electric Light Orchestra

from the album On the Third Day
- B-side: "Daybreaker" (US); "Oh No Not Susan" (UK)
- Released: February 1, 1974
- Studio: AIR (London)
- Genre: Hard rock
- Length: 3:53 (Album length); 3:25 (US single version)
- Label: Warner Bros. (UK); United Artists (US)
- Songwriter: Jeff Lynne
- Producer: Jeff Lynne

Electric Light Orchestra singles chronology
"Showdown" (1973)	"Ma-Ma-Ma Belle" (1974)	"Can't Get It Out of My Head" (1974)

"Ma-Ma-Ma Belle" is a song recorded by the Electric Light Orchestra (ELO).

== Release ==
It was taken from the 1973 album On the Third Day. In the UK, the single version had a slightly different mix from the album original featuring a descending string crescendo and was edited in length. Marc Bolan plays twin lead guitar on the track alongside Jeff Lynne and features on a number of takes from the April 1973 ELO session, such as "Dreaming of 4000". "Ma-Ma-Ma Belle" also featured on The ELO EP in 1978. In the UK the B-side "Oh No Not Susan" found its way on to various DJs' playlists at the BBC, unaware that the song's lyrics contained profanity. In the United States "Daybreaker", the single's flip side, proved more popular and the song was relegated as a b-side in 1976 on "Livin' Thing".

In 1974 Cash Box compared "Ma-Ma-Ma Belle" to the style of rock and roll of ELO's predecessor The Move. …"just take their [The Move] brand of rock 'n roll, add an extra dash of heavy and there you have it—this new ELO disk." Record World called it a "French-fried rocker" in which "crispy r&r should crunch onward as a bright biggie." Greg Shaw of Rolling Stone considered that it plagiarized "Jerkin' Crocus" by Mott The Hoople.

Early working titles for the song were "Auntie" and "My Woman", both of which have found their way onto various compilations.

The UK single version of Ma-Ma-Ma Belle contains a unique rising string interlude following the second chorus that is not heard on the album version. This short segment is actually lifted from the song Dreaming Of 4000 where it is extracted from that song, flipped backwards, a flange effect is added and it's inserted into Ma-Ma-Ma Belle's UK single mix.

== B-sides ==
=== "Daybreaker" ===
"Daybreaker" is an instrumental song on the album On the Third Day. It was the first of two instrumentals on the album. A prominent feature of its arrangement was Richard Tandy playing arpeggios on a Minimoog synthesizer.

The song was the B-side to the single, "Ma-Ma-Ma Belle", in the US; however the B-side received more airplay than the A-side, so "Daybreaker" charted instead, reaching position 87 on the Billboard Hot 100 in May 1974. Despite its US hit status, the song is rarely included on any of the band's extensive compilation albums.

=== "Oh No Not Susan" ===
"Oh No Not Susan" is a song written by Lynne taken from the album On the Third Day recorded in 1973.

Despite the song's lyrics containing profanity, it received much airplay at the time being the UK B-side to "Ma-Ma-Ma Belle". On the album's original lyric sheet the offensive word was omitted. Bev Bevan remarked:

"On [On The Third Day] there is a song called Oh No, Not Susan on which Jeff sings: 'Oh, no not me, that's all she says... her money and her place they just don't mean a fucking thing...' The BBC played it many times, despite their policy towards such lyrics. It just goes to show that if you keep quiet about it and don't make maximum fuss to get publicity there isn't anyone listening closely to words on the radio."

== Chart positions ==
"Ma-Ma-Ma Belle"

Chart (1974)	Peak Position
UK Singles (Official Charts)	22

"Daybreaker"

Chart (1974)	Peak Position
Canada Top Singles (RPM)	57
US Billboard Hot 100	87
US Cash Box	61

== Jeff Lynne version ==
Jeff Lynne re-recorded the song in his own home studio. It was released in a compilation album with other re-recorded ELO songs, under the ELO name, as an iTunes Store exclusive bonus track.
