= Showdown (Electric Light Orchestra song) =

Single by Electric Light Orchestra

from the album On the Third Day (US version)
- B-side: "In Old England Town" (instrumental)
- Released: 1973
- Recorded: AIR (London)
- Genre: R&B
- Length: 4:09 (US album version/UK single length); 3:53 (US single edit)
- Label: Harvest (UK); United Artists (US)
- Songwriter: Jeff Lynne
- Producer: Jeff Lynne

Electric Light Orchestra singles chronology
| "Roll Over Beethoven" (1973) | "Showdown" (1973) | "Ma-Ma-Ma Belle" (1974) |

Official audio
- "Showdown" on YouTube

"Showdown" is a 1973 song written by Jeff Lynne and recorded by the Electric Light Orchestra (ELO). It was the band's last contemporary recording to be released on the Harvest label. The song was released as a single and reached No 12 in the UK Singles Chart, in the week beginning 28 October, and No 9 on the Norwegian chart VG-lista.

== Release ==
In the US the song was included on the album On the Third Day (1973), while in the UK the song was omitted from that album but featured a year later on the band's first compilation album, also entitled Showdown. In 2006 the remastered issue of On the Third Day would feature the song on the album in both countries for the first time.

The song showed a change of style for ELO, with a funkier backbeat beneath the band's trademark sweeping strings, and the inclusion of a clavinet. The record was a favourite of John Lennon's at the time, who dubbed the band "Son of Beatles" in a US radio interview. Lennon described the song as "a beautiful combination” of Marvin Gaye’s 'I Heard It Through the Grapevine' and Lou Christie’s 'Lightnin' Strikes,' with a little ['I Am the Walrus'] underneath."

Marc Bolan of T. Rex was at the session where the song was recorded and played on several of the band's tracks at that time, but did not play on "Showdown" itself. Instead, Jeff Lynne borrowed Bolan's Gibson Firebird guitar to play over the instrumental break.

Lynne said "I made the riff up and I was thrilled with it. I knew it was going to be a hit even after I had just done a few notes of it. When we cut it the engineer said, ‘This is a classic.’ I was thrilled to bits."

Cash Box said the song "can almost be termed 'classical blues' and sheds a new light on the group that most folks will immediately be attracted to." Record World called it "a Jeff Lynne original that's bound to click on AM and FM alike."

Stereogum contributor Ryan Reed rated it as ELO's 6th best song. John Lennon rated the song highly and said ""Showdown' I thought was a great record and I was expecting it to be #1 but I don’t think UA [United Artists] got their fingers out and pushed it. And it’s a nice group – I call them 'Son of Beatles' – although they’re doing things we never did, obviously."

In 2022 Lynne listed it as one of his nine favourite ELO songs.

== B-side ==
The B-side, "In Old England Town", is an edited instrumental version of "In Old England Town (Boogie No. 2)" by Lynne. Recorded in 1972, this was the opening track of the band's second LP ELO 2, and was one of two songs on the album that featured Roy Wood on cello and bass guitar, the other being "From the Sun to the World". Shortly after recording these tracks, Wood abandoned ELO to form Wizzard, and he was not originally credited on the LP sleeve. Normally Wood and Lynne co-produced all their collaborations, but it is unknown whether Wood was involved in the production of either track.

A planned concept album entitled "The Lost Planet" was quietly abandoned and sessions for the second LP proper began May 1972. Two new Jeff Lynne songs, "From the Sun to the World" and "In Old England Town" were the first to be recorded and included Roy Wood on bass guitar and cello, but in little more than a month, the co-founder of the ELO concept left the group. —Rob Caiger, 28 March 2006, ELO II Remaster

The song was included in ELO's first 1972 tour playlist, simply titled Jeff's Boogie #2, and had a different set of lyrics. This early live version was filmed for Granada Television's Set of Six in 1972; that is the only live footage of the original ELO known to exist. These songs were released on a 2006 DVD called ELO – Total Rock Review.

The Moog intro of the edited version was later sampled and included on Paul Weller's hit single "The Changingman", as was the main riff from "10538 Overture".

== Personnel ==
- Jeff Lynne – vocals, guitars
- Bev Bevan – drums, percussion
- Richard Tandy – piano, Moog synthesizer, clavinet, Wurlitzer electric piano
- Mike de Albuquerque – bass, backing vocals
- Mike Edwards – cello
- Wilf Gibson – violin
- Colin Walker – cello

== Charts ==
| Chart (1973–1974) | Peak position |
|---|---|
| Canada Top Singles (RPM) | 47 |
| Netherlands (Dutch Top 40) | 28 |
| Netherlands (Single Top 100) | 25 |
| Norway (VG-lista) | 9 |
| UK Singles (Official Charts) | 12 |
| US Billboard Hot 100 | 53 |
| US Cash Box | 51 |

== Jeff Lynne version ==
Lynne re-recorded the song in his own home studio in 2012. It was released on the compilation album Mr. Blue Sky: The Very Best of Electric Light Orchestra along with other re-recorded ELO songs, under the ELO name.
