= 10538 Overture =

1972 single by the Electric Light Orchestra

Single by the Electric Light Orchestra

from the album The Electric Light Orchestra
- B-side: "First Movement (Jumping Biz)" (UK); "The Battle of Marston Moor (July 2nd 1644)" (US)
- Released: 23 June 1972
- Recorded: July 1970
- Studio: Philips (London)
- Genre: Hard rock; cello rock; psychedelic
- Length: 5:32 (album); 4:04 (single)
- Label: Harvest
- Songwriter: Jeff Lynne
- Producers: Roy Wood; Jeff Lynne

The Electric Light Orchestra singles chronology
"10538 Overture" (1972)	"Roll Over Beethoven" (1973)

Official audio
- "10538 Overture" on YouTube

"10538 Overture" is the debut single by the English band the Electric Light Orchestra. It was released on 23 June 1972 as the lead single from their self-titled debut studio album (1971). It is a hard rock song influenced by psychedelic music, with cello instrumentation and lyrics about an escaped prisoner. Originally written by co-founder Jeff Lynne for his and Roy Wood's previous band, the Move, it became the first recording by the Electric Light Orchestra after Wood added orchestral instruments to the song.

== Background and recording ==
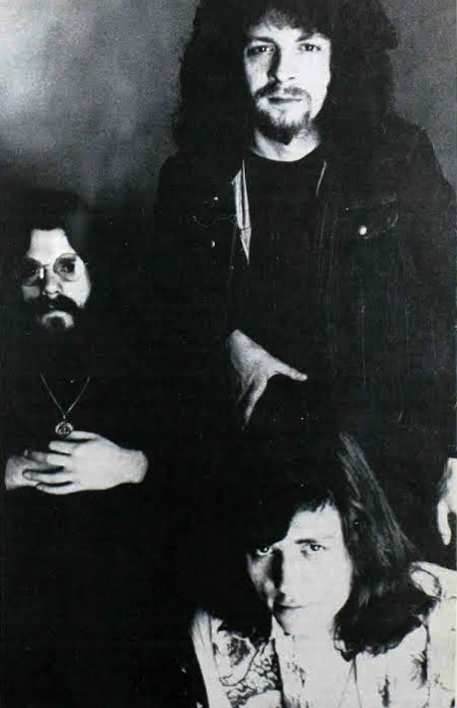
Roy Wood, Jeff Lynne and Bev Bevan in 1971

After seeing an orchestra in the studio during the recording of the Move's debut album, Move (1968), band member Roy Wood conceived the idea of a new rock band that would emphasise orchestral instruments over traditional rock instrumentation. This approach was inspired by George Martin's string arrangements for some of the Beatles' songs, such as "Strawberry Fields Forever". Lynne was also enthusiastic after Wood told him about the idea, and they agreed to work together on the project.

Jeff Lynne first wrote and demoed "10538 Overture" in his family home in Birmingham, using a Bang & Olufsen Beocord 2000 reel-to-reel tape recorder. He wrote the song around its double-tracked guitar riff. Recorded in July 1970 during the sessions for the Move's third album, Looking On (1970), the song was initially intended to be a B-side for one of the band's singles.

After recording the song's backing track, bassist Rick Price and drummer Bev Bevan left the studio, while Lynne and Wood stayed behind. While they were listening back to the recording, Wood, who had purchased and began learning to play a cello two weeks prior, began improvising a Jimi Hendrix-inspired string part over it. Lynne insisted that they record it immediately, and Wood overdubbed the song's string parts that night, creating a sound he later described as "a real heavy metal orchestra". This recording became the first song by the Electric Light Orchestra, and it became the blueprint for the musical style of the band's early work. Lynne later cited the creation of "10538 Overture" as the first moment in his career that he felt that he could write a hit single.

== Composition and lyrics ==
"10538 Overture" is a midtempo hard rock song, with influences from psychedelic music. The song is composed in the key of C major in common time, with a measure of 5/4 introduced before each bridge. Its instrumentation consists of drums, bass, guitar, cellos, horns, and woodwinds. Wood and Lynne share lead vocals on the song. It was recorded at Philips Studios, in London.

It opens with a descending, arpeggiated electric guitar riff, before a French horn part and Wood's aggressive, multitracked cello performance are introduced. Wood later said that he was playing the string part "not as a cellist, but as a rock guitarist". Mark Beaumont of The Guardian wrote in 2016 that the song "perfected the formula" of the band's goal to bring classical influences into their music, and that it was less progressive than much of their other early work. Several contemporary critics compared the song to the works of the Beatles, particularly "I Am the Walrus".

Lynne's lyrics for "10538 Overture" were written about an escaped prisoner. Wood recounted in 2001 that Lynne had wanted the song's protagonist to have a number rather than a name, and they decided upon 1053, which was the serial number of the mixing console in the studio. They added an eight later to fit the song's lyrics. Bevan recalled the origins of the song's title differently, saying that it was inspired by a neighbour of Lynne's parents. Bevan stated that "he was a bit lacking in the brains department", and "used to have letters and numbers written across his forehead, and Jeff got the idea from that".

== Promotion and release ==
Roy Wood first announced the Electric Light Orchestra project and "10538 Overture" in late 1970, stating that the song would "be on release in the very near future". It was first released as the opening track on The Electric Light Orchestra on 3 December 1971. It was released as the album's lead single in edited form six months later, on 23 June 1972, with "First Movement (Jumping Biz)" as its B-side. In the US, the single was instead released with "The Battle of Marston Moor (July 2nd 1644)" as its B-side. the A promotional music video for "10538 Overture", featuring the band miming to the song, was filmed to promote the band internationally. They also made appearances on BBC's Top of the Pops and the Old Grey Whistle Test to promote the single. Their performance on the former featured violinist Wilf Gibson and a roadie wearing a pig mask miming the song's cello parts.

"10538 Overture" made its debut on the UK singles chart at number 45 on 29 July 1972. It peaked at number nine on 26 August 1972, and remained within the top twenty for six consecutive weeks. (Note: Attributed to multiple references.) In France, the song peaked at number five on the French Singles Chart, and spent three weeks on the chart. In the Netherlands, the song entered the Tipparade charts at number 30 on 30 September 1972. It peaked at number 24 two weeks later and spent three weeks on the chart in total. (Note: Attributed to multiple references.) The song did not chart in the United States, despite predictions of success from multiple music publications.

There was contention within the band's management over the choice of "10538 Overture" as the band's first single. Don Arden, their manager, objected to it, while A&R representative Nick Mobbs of Harvest Records pushed for its release. Arden was still trying to prevent the single's release only ten days before it was distributed. A month after the single's release, Wood left the Electric Light Orchestra due to disagreements with Lynne and their management.

== Critical reception ==
"10538 Overture" was received favourably by contemporary music critics, several of whom compared it to the works of the Beatles. Penny Valentine of Sounds wrote that the song was "a splendid piece of wizardry from Wood". Melody Maker's Roy Hollingworth praised the song and its production, dubbing it a "monster of a track". John Peel of Disc and Music Echo called the song "lovely" and described its style as "a dormant sound that has been awoken". James Caven of the Evening Times wrote that the song made "compelling listening" and predicted that the single would "attract some attention".

Retrospective reviews of the song have also been positive. Writing in 2006, Ed Masley of the Pittsburgh Post-Gazette named the song among the most enduring on The Electric Light Orchestra, and praised its "richly textured majesty and yearning hooks". David Weigel of PopMatters called it "a perfect combination of sounds and themes, a deserved hit single that the band was never able to recreate". Ryan Reed of Stereogum ranked it as the band's ninth best song in 2016, writing that it "solidified the project’s classical-rock aim straight out of the gate" and that "the late-'60s Beatles influence was never more apparent". He went on to say that, while the band "would quickly shed this psychedelic skin, [...] they wore it beautifully here".

The track was interpolated in “The Changingman” by Paul Weller in 1995.

== Live performances ==
Since its release, "10538 Overture" has been consistently featured in the Electric Light Orchestra's concert setlists, up to their final concert tour, the Over and Out tour, in 2024. A performance of the song appeared on the band's 1974 live album The Night the Light Went On in Long Beach, and was included as the B-side on the US and UK release of "Evil Woman". During the band's 1976 performances in support of Face the Music, they performed the song as a medley with "Do Ya".

== Personnel ==
Electric Light Orchestra

- Jeff Lynne – vocals, electric and acoustic guitars, co-production
- Roy Wood – vocals, cello, bass guitar, co-production
- Bill Hunt – French horn, hunting horn
- Steve Woolam – violin
- Bev Bevan – drums, percussion

Technical

- Roger Wake – engineering
- Pete Cliff – engineering

== Charts ==
Weekly chart performance for "10538 Overture"
Chart (1972)	Peak position
France (SNEP)	5
Netherlands (Tipparade)	24
UK Singles (OCC)	9

== Notes and references ==
=== Sources ===
- Van der Kiste, John (15 August 2015). Jeff Lynne: Electric Light Orchestra: Before and After. Fonthill Media. ISBN 9781781554920.
- Spicer, Mark (29 January 2018). "The Electric Light Orchestra and the Anxiety of the Beatles' Influence". In Burns, Lori; Lacasse, Serge (eds.). The Pop Palimpsest: Intertextuality in Recorded Popular Music. University of Michigan Press. ISBN 9780472123513.
- Lynne, Jeff (26 November 2018). Wembley or Bust: Jeff Lynne's ELO. Genesis Publications. ISBN 9781905662647.
- Electric Light Orchestra • Anthology. United States: United Artists Music. 1999. pp. 140–142.
