= Mr. Blue Sky =

1978 single by Electric Light Orchestra

- UK single artwork

Single by Electric Light Orchestra

from the album Out of the Blue
- B-side: "One Summer Dream"
- Released: 20 January 1978 (UK)
- Studio: Musicland, Munich, Germany
- Genre: Progressive pop; experimental pop; symphonic rock
- Length: 5:06 (album version); 3:44 (7-inch single)
- Label: Jet
- Songwriter: Jeff Lynne
- Producer: Jeff Lynne

Electric Light Orchestra singles chronology
"Turn to Stone" (1977)	"Mr. Blue Sky" (1978)	"Sweet Talkin' Woman" (1978)

Music video
- "Mr. Blue Sky" on YouTube

"Mr. Blue Sky" is a song by Electric Light Orchestra (ELO), featured on the band's seventh studio album Out of the Blue (1977). Written and produced by frontman Jeff Lynne, the song forms the fourth and final track of the "Concerto for a Rainy Day" suite on side three of the original double album. "Mr. Blue Sky" was the second single to be taken from Out of the Blue, peaking at number 6 on the UK Singles Chart and number 35 on the US Billboard Hot 100.

Promotional copies were released on blue vinyl, like the album from which the single was issued. Due to its popularity and frequent use in multiple television shows and films, it has sometimes been described as the band's signature song.

== Inspiration ==
In a BBC Radio interview, Lynne talked about writing "Mr. Blue Sky" after locking himself away in a Swiss chalet and attempting to write ELO's follow-up to A New World Record:

It was dark and misty for two weeks, and I didn't come up with a thing. Suddenly the sun shone, and it was, 'Wow, look at those beautiful Alps.' I wrote Mr. Blue Sky and 13 other songs in the next two weeks.

Lynne also said:

I suppose this is my most well-known song. Everybody tells me something different about it. It's even got crazy appeal to kids since it's like a nursery rhyme. I remember writing the words down. I was at a chalet in the mountains of Switzerland, and it was all misty and cloudy all the way around. I didn't see any countryside for the first four days or so, and then everything cleared, and there was this enormous view forever, and the sky was blue.

The song's arrangement has been called "Beatlesque", bearing similarities to Beatles songs "Martha My Dear" and "A Day in the Life" while harmonically it shares its unusual first four chords and harmonic rhythm with "Yesterday". The song's piano and drum intro is borrowed from the Kinks' 1968 song "Do You Remember Walter".

An alternate account of the song's composition was suggested by bassist Kelly Groucutt's 1983 lawsuit against Lynne, in which Groucutt alleged that he had written the song's middle section, but had not been officially credited in this capacity.

== Arrangement ==
"Mr. Blue Sky" sample

The arrangement makes prominent use of a cowbell-like sound, which is credited on the album, to percussionist Bev Bevan, as that of a fire extinguisher.

Describing the song for the BBC, Dominic King said:

Lots of Gibb Brothers' vocal inflexions and Beatles' arrangement quotes (Penny Lane bell, Pepper panting, Abbey Road arpeggio guitars). But this fabulous madness creates its own wonder – the bendy guitar solo, funky cello stop-chorus, and the most freakatastic vocoder since Sparky's Magic Piano. Plus, the musical ambush on "way" at 2.51 still thrills. And that's before the Swingle Singers/RKO Tarzan movie/Rachmaninoff symphonic finale gets underway. Kitsch, yet truly exhilarating.

The song features a heavily vocoded voice singing the phrase "Mr. Blue Sky", as well as the phrase "please turn me over" at the end, instructing the listener to flip the LP.

== Critical reception ==
AllMusic's Donald A. Guarisco considered "Mr. Blue Sky" a "miniature pop symphony" and a "multi-layered pop treat that was a pure Beatles pastiche", saying that "the music divides its time between verses that repeat the same two notes to hypnotic effect a la 'I Am the Walrus' and an effervescent, constantly-ascending chorus". Guarisco also pointed out other references to the Beatles, such as "the staccato bassline [recalling] the chorus of 'Hello Goodbye' and pounding piano lines and panting background vocals [recalling] the midsection of 'A Day in the Life'". Music critic Nick DeRiso identified several references to Beatles' songs, including "Hello, Goodbye", "I Am the Walrus", "Maxwell's Silver Hammer" and "A Day in the Life".

Billboard described the beat as "catchy" and said that the song builds from a "thumping intro" to a "harmonic operatic" ending. Cash Box said that the song "features a characteristically full sound and effective use of breaks" and that "fast pace, airy singing and strings provide musical dramatics." Record World said that "this up-tempo tune guarantees Lynne's legend as both writer and producer and shows off ELO's unique sound."

Ultimate Classic Rock critic Michael Gallucci rated it ELO's best song. Classic Rock History critic Brian Kachejian rated it as ELO's 2nd best song, highlighting the "bouncing piano groove at the beginning of the song that is one of the coolest rock and pop licks you have ever heard." Stereogum contributor Ryan Reed also rated it as ELO's 2nd best song, saying that although it was released on the album as part of "Concerto for a Rainy Day", it actually "functions best as a stand-alone art-pop epic, a sort of engorged 'Penny Lane' – built on stomping pianos, manic cowbell...and an octave-spanning choral vocal arrangement."

In 2022, Lynne listed it as one of his nine favorite ELO songs.

== Personnel ==
- Jeff Lynne – lead and backing vocals, lead and rhythm guitars, orchestral and choral arrangements
- Bev Bevan – drums, various percussion instruments, cymbals, backing vocals, fire extinguisher
- Richard Tandy – piano, electric piano, synthesizer, vocoder, orchestral and choral arrangements
- Kelly Groucutt – bass guitar, backing vocals
- Mik Kaminski – violin
- Hugh McDowell – cello
- Melvyn Gale – cello

=== Additional personnel ===
- Louis Clark – orchestral and choral arrangements, orchestra conductor

== Charts ==
=== Weekly charts ===
Chart (1978)	Peak position
Australia Kent Music Report	87
Belgium (Ultratop 50 Flanders)	18
Canada Top Singles (RPM)	26
Ireland (IRMA)	28
Netherlands (Dutch Top 40)	11
Netherlands (Single Top 100)	8
UK Singles (Official Charts)	6
US Billboard Hot 100	35
US Cash Box Top 100	27
US Record World Singles	33
West Germany (GfK)	27

Chart (2008)	Peak position
Ireland (IRMA)	29

Chart (2011)	Peak position
UK Singles (OCC)	88

Chart (2017)	Peak position
US Hot Rock & Alternative Songs (Billboard)	12
US Rock Digital Song Sales (Billboard)	11

Chart (2019)	Peak position
US Rock Streaming Songs (Billboard)	11

=== Year-end charts ===
Chart (1978)	Position
Netherlands (Dutch Top 40)	69
Netherlands (Single Top 100)	43
UK (Music Week)	43
US (Joel Whitburn's Pop Annual)	206

Chart (2017)	Position
US Hot Rock Songs (Billboard)	71

== Certifications ==
Region	Certification	Certified units/sales
Denmark (IFPI Danmark)	Gold	45,000^{‡}
Germany (BVMI)	Gold	250,000^{‡}
Italy (FIMI)	Gold	35,000^{‡}
New Zealand (RMNZ)	4× Platinum	120,000^{‡}
Spain (Promusicae)	Platinum	60,000^{‡}
United Kingdom (BPI)	4× Platinum	2,400,000^{‡}
United States (RIAA)	3× Platinum	3,000,000^{‡}
^{‡} Sales+streaming figures based on certification alone.

== Jeff Lynne version ==
"Mr. Blue Sky"

Song by Electric Light Orchestra

from the album Mr. Blue Sky: The Very Best of Electric Light Orchestra
- Released: 8 October 2012 (UK); 9 October 2012 (US)
- Recorded: 2001–2008
- Studio: Bungalow Palace
- Length: 3:44
- Label: Frontiers
- Songwriter: Jeff Lynne
- Producer: Jeff Lynne

Music video
- "Mr. Blue Sky" on YouTube

Jeff Lynne re-recorded the song and other ELO tracks in his home studio in 2012. The resulting album, Mr. Blue Sky: The Very Best of Electric Light Orchestra, was released under the ELO name. The difference in this version is that it does not include the ending orchestral piece.

=== Music video ===
A music video was released in late 2012 via the official ELO website and YouTube, a colourful animation directed by Michael Patterson and Candace Reckinger with animation sequences designed and animated by University of Southern California students.

=== Personnel ===
- Jeff Lynne – vocals, guitar, piano, bass, drums, keyboards, vocoder
- Rosie Vela – backing vocals
- Marc Mann – strings
- Steve Jay – shakers, tambourine
