= Mike Edwards (musician) =

English cellist and music teacher (1948–2010)

Background information
- Also known as: Swami Deva Pramada, Pramada
- Born: Michael Edwards; 31 May 1948; West London, England
- Origin: Ealing, London, England
- Died: 3 September 2010 (aged 62) Devon, England
- Genres: Rock; classical
- Occupations: Musician; music teacher
- Instruments: Cello; viol
- Labels: Harvest; Jet
- Formerly of: Electric Light Orchestra
- Website: Musical career

Michael Edwards (31 May 1948 – 3 September 2010), later known as Swami Deva Pramada or simply Pramada, was an English cellist and music teacher. He was a member of the Electric Light Orchestra in its early years.

== Early life ==
Mike Edwards was born on 31 May 1948 in West London to Frank and Lillian Edwards. The family lived in South Ealing and he went to school at Grange Primary School. He passed the Eleven-plus exam and went to Ealing Grammar School for Boys where an inspirational music teacher John Railton encouraged his love of music.

His father was an amateur cellist, but died when Edwards was 14, leaving his mother to bring up Edwards and his older brother on her own. He studied the piano with John Railton, and cello with Maryse Chome-Wilson. He played in the Ealing Youth Orchestra.

After school, Edwards gained a job in the Midland Bank for a year during which he was able to decide that his career should be in music and he was able to pass the entrance audition to the Royal Academy of Music in 1968 to study the cello with Douglas Cameron and the viola de gamba with Dennis Nesbitt. He gained a LRAM in cello teaching. As well as developing his musical skills, the academy broadened his musical experience, encouraged by tutors such as John Dankworth, who introduced him to playing jazz and big band music.

== Career ==
=== Electric Light Orchestra years ===
Edwards joined the Electric Light Orchestra (ELO) in 1972 and played with the band from their first live gig in Croydon until he departed, of his own choosing, in January 1975. Previously he had had little interest in non-classical music, though he had played on recording sessions for Barclay James Harvest.

Although his bandmates remembered him as a small, shy, broadly-smiling classicist in formal attire, his eccentric cello playing (fingering the strings with an orange or grapefruit) and bizarre costumes were a major ingredient of early ELO concerts: his cello solo spots, often The Dying Swan or Bach's Air, ended with his instrument exploding with the aid of pyrotechnics (Edwards actually mimed to a backing track using a specially rigged instrument). He contributed to the studio albums ELO 2, On the Third Day, and Eldorado, and the live album, The Night the Light Went On in Long Beach. He was replaced by Melvyn Gale.

=== Life after ELO ===
He changed his name to Pramada on becoming a sannyasin of Osho: the name means "divine contentment". During the 1980s, he lived in the group's large Medina commune near Herringswell in Suffolk as well as spells in Poona in India, Hamburg in Germany, and the US, and later in Vauxhall and Archway, London. Subsequently, he appeared for three years as a duo with dancer Avis von Herder. Their work and performances were based on improvisation and included the production of his composition Vampire Madonna at the Edinburgh Festival. In later years, his work involved stage plays, arrangements and cross-genre recordings such as the album "No goal but the path" by Terra Incognita.

After moving to Dartington in Devon, he produced and composed music for The Prophet by Khalil Gibran with words spoken by actor Tim Brophy. He also composed and recorded music for poems by William Blake. Edwards played cello and bass viol in groups of all musical genres and established a private cello and viol teaching practice. A workshop in Devon of the European String Teachers Association (of which he was SW region chairman) in 1999, which the violinist Margaret Faultless was invited to direct, resulted in the formation of the Devon Baroque orchestra. Edwards played in virtually every one of its 100 or so concerts in the ten years before his death.

In addition to his playing with Devon Baroque he helped to form Sicilienne, L'Ardito, Ashburton Cello ensemble, Devon Early Music Group, Compagnie Giulia, Daughters of Elvin, Ta Filia and Presence.

== Death ==
Edwards was killed on the A381 road between Harbertonford and Halwell near where he lived in Totnes in Devon, on 3 September 2010, when a cylindrical hay bale weighing 600 kilograms (1,300 lb) rolled down a hillside and collided with the van he was driving. A court case concluding on 19 November 2012 resulted in two defendants being found not guilty of health and safety charges relating to the accident. ELO co-founder Jeff Lynne posted the following about Edwards:

Mike Edwards was unlike your average balaclava wearing cellist in a rock group. He was a very good natured chap who mixed politeness and reserve with wild and wacky stage performances. Even though he left the group over 35 years ago I occasionally think about him on stage in his woolen balaclava playing his cello solo with an orange. Now that was pretty original. Mike was a great cellist but most of all a real gentleman. The wild and strange middle bit in "Showdown" is actually Mike Edwards double tracked over and over adding odd notes all the time. I love that bit.

— Jeff Lynne

== See also ==
- List of unusual deaths in the 21st century
