= Mike de Albuquerque =

- Born: Michael de Albuquerque; 24 June 1947 (age 79); Wimbledon, Surrey, England
- Genres: Rock; Progressive rock
- Occupation: Musician
- Instruments: Bass guitar, guitar, vocals
- Label: Harvest Records
- Formerly of: Electric Light Orchestra; Violinski; Sundance
- Website: Musical career

Mike de Albuquerque (born 24 June 1947, Wimbledon, Surrey) is an English musician, who was a member of the progressive rock band Electric Light Orchestra from 1972 to 1974.

== Biography ==
In 1971, in partnership with percussionist Frank Ricotti, Albuquerque released the jazz-rock album First Wind. Under the name 'Ricotti and Albuquerque', the band featured Albuquerque on guitar and vocals and Ricotti on vibraphone, alto saxophone and percussion, with Trevor Tomkins on drums, Chris Laurence on electric and acoustic bass and John Taylor on electric piano, supplemented by Michael Keen and Henry Lowther on trumpet.

Between 1972 and 1974, he was the bassist and secondary vocalist for Electric Light Orchestra. He left for domestic reasons, during the recording sessions for the group's fourth album Eldorado, and was replaced by Kelly Groucutt. He released two solo progressive rock albums, We May Be Cattle But We've All Got Names (1973) and Stalking The Sleeper (1976). Albuquerque also featured as a guitarist and vocalist alongside former ELO bandmate Mik Kaminski in Violinski. His contributions on record for ELO were ELO 2, On the Third Day, The Night the Light Went On in Long Beach and some of Eldorado. His song "My Darling Girl" was recorded by Tim Hardin for his last album, Nine, in 1973.

In 1975, he played bass on Maxine Nightingale's album Right Back Where We Started From along with its title track.

In 1981, he founded the band Sundance, along with Mike Hurst and Mary Hopkin. They released one album, Sundance, in 1982 on Angel Air Records, which was re-released on CD in 2002

== Discography ==
=== Solo and collaborations ===
- First Wind, (Ricotti & Albuquerque), (with Frank Ricotti), 1971, Pegasus: PEG 2; Think Like a Key TLAK1192
- We May Be Cattle But We've All Got Names, 1973, RCA Victor: SF 8383; Think Like a Key TLAK1173
- Stalking The Sleeper, 1976, Warner Bros.: K56276; Think Like a Key TLAK1225

=== With Sundance ===
- Sundance, 1982, Angel Air: SJPCD113
