= Wilfred Gibson =

- Born: 28 February 1942; Dilston, Northumberland, England
- Died: 21 October 2014 (aged 72)
- Genres: Rock, classical
- Occupation: Musician
- Instrument: Violin
- Labels: Harvest, Zah Zah
- Formerly of: Electric Light Orchestra, Centipede

Wilfred Gibson (28 February 1942 – 21 October 2014) was an English violinist, session musician, and early member of the Electric Light Orchestra.

== Early life ==
Wilfred Gibson was born on 28 February 1942 in Dilston, Northumberland. He received his education at the Royal Grammar School in Newcastle and won a scholarship to the Royal College of Music, where he learned to play the violin and piano, and to conduct. He began performing in public from the age of eight and took part in regional tournaments in his teens. He began playing with symphony orchestras in his teen years, including the National Youth Orchestra of Great Britain. He worked for a short time as a conductor and then broke into orchestral work as a player through the 1960s. Gibson played with the Bergen Philharmonic Orchestra, the Royal Concertgebouw Orchestra in Amsterdam, the London Symphony Orchestra and the Philharmonia Orchestra. His association with the London orchestras was lifelong and involved numerous recordings.

== Career ==
=== Early session work ===
Gibson thought that his first pop recording session might have been "Delilah" in 1967. In 1970, Gibson played lead violin on Centipede's 1970 album Septober Energy. The following year, he led and played violin in a small orchestra that performed "Prelude - Song of the Gulls" on King Crimson's fourth studio album Islands, though he was uncredited.

=== With Electric Light Orchestra ===
In 1972, Gibson replaced original ELO violinist Steve Woolam and performed in their first live concert at the Greyhound Pub in Croydon, Surrey. Gibson then played the violin on the ELO II album, including on their cover of Chuck Berry's "Roll Over Beethoven", which became a top ten hit in the UK in September 1973.

However, by 1973, he had begun to be gradually replaced by Mik Kaminski, who played violin on much of the first side of ELO's 1973 LP On the Third Day. Still, Gibson was able to play on the tracks "Showdown", "Daybreaker", "Ma-Ma-Ma Belle", "Dreaming of 4000," and the band's cover of Edvard Grieg's "In the Hall of the Mountain King", as well as the various interludes in between tracks.

After this album, Gibson's time in ELO came to an end. After leaving the group, Gibson declined an invitation to join King Crimson as a replacement for violinist David Cross.

=== Later session work, ELO Part II, and other projects ===
In 1975, Gibson was a string arranger and conductor for two songs on Maxine Nightingale's album Right Back Where We Started From including its title track.

In 1989, he was the violinist in the BBC Radio 3 musical drama Notes from Janàcek's Diary. He contributed to the Hothouse Flowers album Home (1990), and to The Beloved's Happiness (1995) as well as appearing on the Oasis hit "Whatever".

In 1991, Gibson was reunited with some of his old ELO bandmates when he played as part of the session orchestra for ELO Part II's self-titled album, though his contributions were uncredited. He would also join them on 1994's Moment of Truth, but this would mark the end of his involvement with any ELO-related groups.

Later, Gibson played in Alan Gout's Berkeley Square Society Band, which played covers of songs from the 1920s and 1930s. The group released an album, Gershwin in London Town on the Zah Zah record label in 1998.

== Death ==
Gibson died in 2014 after a short illness.
