= Melvyn Gale =

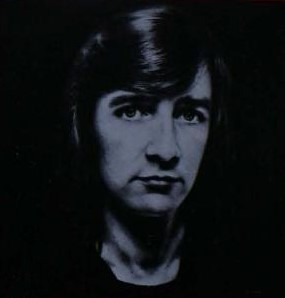
- Gale in 1977

Background information
- Born: Melvyn Gale; 15 January 1952 (age 74); London, England
- Genre: Rock
- Occupation: Musician
- Instruments: Cello, keyboards
- Years active: 1974–1980
- Label: Jet Records

Melvyn Gale (born 15 January 1952) is an English retired cellist.

== Career ==
Born in London, Gale attended the Royal Academy of Music and the Guildhall School of Music and Drama. He played his first professional concert with the London Palladium Orchestra in 1970. He also played with the Bolshoi and Rambert Ballet companies, the London Youth Symphony Orchestra, and various West End shows.

He was a cellist for the Electric Light Orchestra from 1975, replacing Mike Edwards. He is also a pianist, performing piano on "Wild West Hero" as well as occasionally live on "Roll Over Beethoven".

In 1979, he appeared in the Discovery music video playing alongside the rest of the classic line-up (Mik Kaminski on violin and close friend Hugh McDowell on cello) for the last time. He remained with the group until he and McDowell were dismissed via letter 1980.

Gale and his friend Frank Wilson built a recording studio in 1979. On 12 April 1980, their first album was released under the name Wilson Gale & Co. and was titled Gift Wrapped Set. The album was recorded at Ramport Studios and was released on Jet Records.

Gale ran a company which manufactured CDs and vinyl records for 18 years.
