= Hugh McDowell =

English cellist (1953–2018)

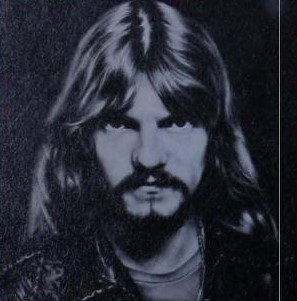
- McDowell in 1977

Background information
- Born: Hugh Alexander McDowell; 31 July 1953
- Origin: Hampstead, London, England
- Died: 6 November 2018 (aged 65)
- Genres: Rock; progressive rock; pop; jazz; classical
- Occupation: Musician
- Instruments: Cello; keyboards
- Years active: 1964–2018
- Label: Jet Records

Hugh Alexander McDowell (31 July 1953 – 6 November 2018) was an English cellist and member of the Electric Light Orchestra (ELO) and related acts.

== Career ==
McDowell started playing the cello at the age of four-and-a-half; by the age of 10, he had won a scholarship to the Yehudi Menuhin School. Only one year later, he made his first professional appearance in Benjamin Britten's The Turn of the Screw, in which he sang. Later, he attended Kingsway College of Further Education, the Royal College of Music and the Guildhall School of Music and Drama. He played with the London Youth Symphony Orchestra, the London Schools Symphony Orchestra, National Youth Orchestra and London Youth Chamber Orchestra, until he was persuaded by Wilf Gibson to join The Electric Light Orchestra.

=== Electric Light Orchestra career ===
McDowell performed with the first live line-up of ELO in 1972 while only 19 years old, but left with founding member Roy Wood and horn player/keyboardist Bill Hunt to perform with the group Wizzard. During his time in Wizzard, he played both cello and Moog synthesizer, but returned to ELO in 1973 to replace Colin Walker. McDowell's return was partly motivated by a desire to play more cello and less keyboards, as he had done with Wizzard. He remained with the group until Jeff Lynne removed the string players from the line-up; both McDowell and his fellow cellist and close friend Melvyn Gale were therefore dismissed in 1980. McDowell (alongside Gale) did, however, appear in promotional videos for the Discovery album, despite not having played on the record. Around a decade after his dismissal from ELO, McDowell joined the group OrKestra, formed by fellow ELO alumni Mik Kaminski and Kelly Groucutt, and appeared alongside the pair in several televised performances. In 1991, former ELO drummer Bev Bevan hired OrKestra as the opening act for the newly-formed Electric Light Orchestra Part II's debut tour, although McDowell, Groucutt and Kaminski also played alongside Part II as a single eight-piece band during the tour, and are credited as full members of Part II in supplementary material. McDowell departed Part II after only a brief period, however, and he appears on neither of the group's studio albums.

=== Post-ELO life ===
In 1980, McDowell played on the album Gift Wrapped by former ELO cellist Melvyn Gale, who had founded the group Wilson Gale & Co. That autumn, he began teaching part-time at the musical instrument technology department of a London higher educational college, the London College of Furniture, now part of the Guildhall University. He conducted a children's orchestra and other orchestras at several London schools.

For a short time around 1982, he guested with Radio Stars and participated in various recordings, including the single "My Mother Said" with the group.

McDowell was a member of the 20th-century chamber groups George W. Welch, Harmonie Band, and Quorum. He joined the Cornelius Cardew Ensemble, a contemporary music group, in 1995.

More recently, he worked on the 2004 Simon Apple album River to the Sea, on the 2005 Saint Etienne album Tales from Turnpike House, the 2005 Wetton Downes album Icon, and appeared as a guest artist on the 2007 Port Mahadia album Echoes in time. He also played cello on Asia's 2008 album Phoenix, on "An Extraordinary Life" and "I Will Remember You".

McDowell also arranged and recorded for pop, rock, and jazz-fusion albums, as well as collaborating in dance, film, and theatre projects.

He was involved with computer programming and published a music composition program called Fractal Music Composer in 1992. He developed a suite of four programs: Mandelbrot Set Composer, Julia Set Composer, Mandelbrot Zoom and Play Midi.

== Death ==
McDowell died of cancer on 6 November 2018.
