= Richard Tandy =

British keyboardist (1948–2024)

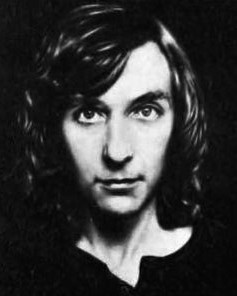
- Tandy in 1977

Background information
- Born: 26 March 1948; Birmingham, Warwickshire, England
- Died: 1 May 2024 (aged 76) Albany, New York, U.S.
- Genres: Symphonic rock; progressive rock; art rock; pop rock
- Occupation: Musician
- Instruments: Keyboards; bass; guitar
- Years active: 1968–2024
- Labels: United Artists; Jet Records; Harvest Records; Epic; EMI; Sony BMG
- Formerly of: Electric Light Orchestra (ELO)
- Website: Musical career

Richard Tandy (26 March 1948 – 1 May 2024) was an English musician. He was the full-time keyboardist in the band Electric Light Orchestra ("ELO"). His palette of keyboards (including Minimoog, Clavinet, Mellotron, and piano) was an important ingredient in the group's sound, especially on the albums A New World Record (1976), Out of the Blue (1977), Discovery (1979) and Time (1981). He collaborated musically with ELO frontman Jeff Lynne on many projects, among them songs for the Electric Dreams soundtrack, Lynne's solo album Armchair Theatre and Lynne-produced Dave Edmunds album Information.

Tandy was inducted into the Rock and Roll Hall of Fame in 2017 as a member of Electric Light Orchestra.

== Life and career ==
=== Early career ===
Tandy was born on 26 March 1948 in Birmingham, Warwickshire and educated at Moseley School, where he first met future bandmate Bev Bevan. Tandy would later be reunited with Bevan in 1968 when he played the harpsichord on The Move's UK number one chart single "Blackberry Way" and briefly joined them live playing keyboards, but switched to bass while regular bassist Trevor Burton was sidelined due to a shoulder injury. When Burton was able to play again, Tandy left to join The Uglys.

=== ELO ===
Tandy joined Electric Light Orchestra (ELO) in 1971, replacing previous bass guitarist Rick Price. At this time he also played guitar on live performances and TV appearances by The Move. In 1972, Tandy served as the bassist in the first live line-up of ELO, before becoming the band's full-time keyboardist after the departure of Bill Hunt who left with Roy Wood to form Wizzard. Tandy was featured on every ELO album since then during the band's original existence starting with ELO 2.

Tandy's keyboards were an integral part of ELO's sound, and include piano, Minimoog, Clavinet, Oberheim, Wurlitzer electric piano, Mellotron, Yamaha CS-80, ARP 2600, and harmonium. He was also proficient on guitar. On some albums he is also credited with vocals or backing vocals, without any specification of which songs. Tandy was Jeff Lynne's right-hand man in the studio and co-arranged the strings with Lynne and Louis Clark from Eldorado onwards.

In 2012, Tandy reunited with Lynne to record another ELO project, a live set of the band's biggest hits recorded at Lynne's Bungalow Palace home recording studio, which was broadcast on television. In 2013, Tandy joined Lynne in performing two songs for Children In Need Rocks, "Livin' Thing" and "Mr Blue Sky". He was also part of ELO's set on Radio 2's Festival In A Day in September 2014.

Tandy was absent from Jeff Lynne's ELO 2015 album Alone in the Universe, on which all of the instruments aside from some percussion were played by Lynne, but was featured on the next album From Out of Nowhere where he played a piano solo on the song "One More Time".

=== Other projects ===
In 1984, Richard Tandy formed the Tandy Morgan Band (also known simply as Tandy & Morgan) featuring Dave Morgan and Martin Smith, both of whom had worked with ELO in live concerts. In 1985, the Tandy Morgan Band released the concept album Earthrise. A remastered version was released on CD on the Rock Legacy label in 2011. A follow-up to Earthrise with previously unpublished tracks was released as The BC Collection, containing one track written by Tandy: "Enola Sad".

Tandy also collaborated musically with ELO frontman Jeff Lynne on many projects, among them songs for the Electric Dreams soundtrack, Lynne's solo album Armchair Theatre and Lynne-produced Dave Edmunds album Information.

== Equipment ==
After permanently switching from bass to keyboards, Tandy's initial onstage setup was of Minimoog synthesizer and Wurlitzer electric piano and occasionally grand piano (as seen on ELO's performance of "Roll Over Beethoven" on The Midnight Special), which he otherwise used mainly in the studio. However, he gradually added more keyboards to his stage and studio rig, including the Hohner clavinet, Mellotron (which was largely relegated to stage use), and other synthesizers, and he began to make more regular use of the grand piano both on stage and in the studio. He also used the Yamaha CS80, ARP 2600, ARP Omni, Polymoog, Micromoog, ARP Quadra, and Oberheim synthesizers from the late 1970s to the early 1980s. Tandy played a harmonium on "Kuiama" on ELO 2.

== Personal life and death ==
Tandy's first marriage was to Carol "Cookie", a friend of Cleo Odzer, but the marriage ended in divorce; he then married his second wife, Sheila. Tandy lived variously in Birmingham, France and Los Angeles, but by the early-to-mid 2010s he resided in Wales.

Tandy died on 1 May 2024, at the age of 76. Lynne posted a tribute later that day, remembering him as "a remarkable musician and friend".

== Discography ==
=== Albums ===
- Earthrise (as Tandy & Morgan) (1985)
- The BC Collection (1992) (as Tandy, Morgan, Smith)

=== Singles ===
- "Berlin" (as R & D a.k.a. Tandy & Morgan) (1984)
- "Action!" (as The Tandy Morgan Band) (1986)
