= Electric Light Orchestra discography =

Recordings by English rock band

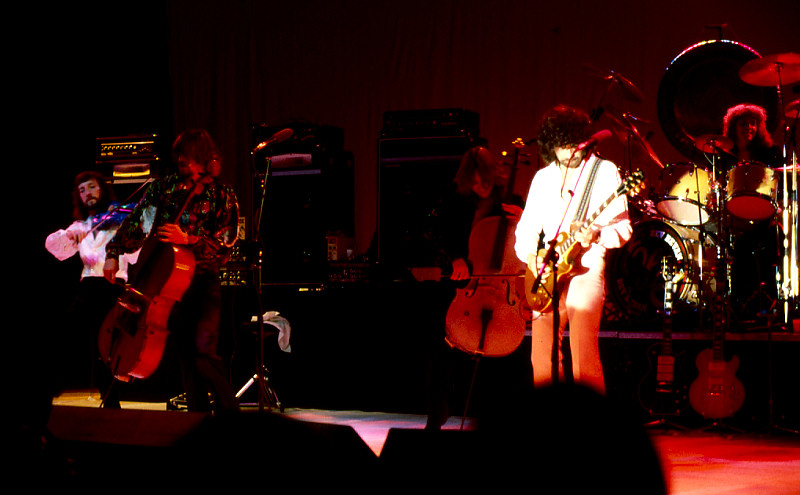
- ELO performing in 1978
- Studio albums: 15
- Extended plays: 1
- Soundtrack albums: 1
- Live albums: 7
- Compilation albums: 40
- Singles: 50
- Video albums: 13
- Music videos: 33
- Box sets: 8

The discography of the English rock band Electric Light Orchestra (ELO) consists of 15 studio albums, seven live albums, 40 compilation albums, 13 video albums, 33 music videos, one extended play, 50 singles, one soundtrack album and eight box sets. ELO have also sold over 50 million records worldwide.

== Albums ==
=== Studio albums ===
Below is a table outlining ELO's studio album output.

Notes: The peak chart listings are accurate but incomplete because of the limited availability of past chart information regarding other countries. All of the RIAA and BPI certifications and/or re-certifications listed are out of date, the majority being decades old. The fact that some albums are listed as non-certified does not necessarily mean those albums have not reached certification sales levels. Record companies that own the manufacturing and distribution rights to a particular record have to pay the RIAA, BPI and related bodies to research, audit and certify that record, whether it be an album, single or compilation.

Title	Album details	Peak chart positions										Certifications
Title	Album details	UK	AUS	AUT	GER	JPN	NLD	NOR	SWE	SWI	US	Certifications
The Electric Light Orchestra No Answer (US) (as The Electric Light Orchestra)	Released: December 1971; Label: Harvest (UK) · United Artists (US); Formats: LP · cassette · CD · CD+DVD-V · 8-trk · digital download	32	54	—	—	—	—	—	—	—	196	
ELO 2 Electric Light Orchestra II (US) (as The Electric Light Orchestra)	Released: March 1973; Label: Harvest (UK) · United Artists (US); Formats: LP · cassette · CD · 8-trk · digital download	35	—	—	—	—	—	—	—	—	62	
On the Third Day	Released: November 1973; Label: Warner Bros. (UK) · United Artists (US); Formats: LP · cassette · CD · 8-trk · digital download	—	10	—	—	—	—	—	—	—	52	
Eldorado	Released: September 1974; Label: Warner Bros. (UK) · United Artists (US); Formats: LP · cassette · CD · 8-trk · digital download	—	40	—	—	—	4	—	—	—	16	CAN: Platinum; US: Gold
Face the Music	Released: September 1975; Label: Jet (UK) · United Artists (US); Formats: LP · cassette · CD · 8-trk · digital download	—	30	—	—	—	11	—	41	—	8	CAN: Gold; US: Gold
A New World Record	Released: 15 October 1976; Label: Jet (UK) · United Artists (US); Formats: LP · cassette · CD · 8-trk · digital download	6	1	9	7	60	2	9	1	—	5	UK: Platinum; CAN: 2× Platinum; NLD: Gold; US: Platinum
Out of the Blue	Released: 24 October 1977; Label: Jet (UK and US); Formats: LP · cassette · CD · 8-trk · digital download	4	3	—	6	32	3	3	2	—	4	UK: Platinum; CAN: Platinum; GER: Gold; NLD: Gold; US: Platinum
Discovery	Released: 1 June 1979; Label: Jet (UK and US); Formats: LP · cassette · CD · 8-trk · digital download	1	1	3	7	31	6	1	2	—	5	UK: Platinum; AUS: 4× Platinum; CAN: 3× Platinum; GER: Gold; US: 2× Platinum
Xanadu (with Olivia Newton-John)	Released: 11 July 1980; Label: Jet (UK) · MCA (US); Formats: LP · cassette · CD · 8-trk	2	1	1	1	—	1	1	1	—	4	UK: Gold; AUS: Platinum; CAN: 2× Platinum; GER: Gold; US: 2× Platinum
Time (as ELO)	Released: 31 July 1981; Label: Jet (UK and US); Formats: LP · cassette · CD · 8-trk · digital download	1	2	2	1	36	2	2	1	—	16	UK: Platinum; CAN: Gold; GER: Gold; US: Gold
Secret Messages	Released: 24 June 1983; Label: Jet (UK and US); Formats: LP · cassette · CD · digital download	4	19	11	6	35	7	5	11	—	36	UK: Gold; CAN: Gold
Balance of Power	Released: 3 March 1986; Label: Jet (various early pressings) · Epic (UK) · CBS Associated (US); Formats: LP · cassette · CD · digital download	9	49	29	18	22	20	4	3	10	49	UK: Silver
Zoom	Released: 12 June 2001; Label: Epic; Formats: LP · cassette · CD · digital download	34	—	51	16	36	46	18	35	26	94^{[B]}	AUS: Platinum
Alone in the Universe (as Jeff Lynne's ELO)	Released: 13 November 2015; Label: RCA (UK) · Columbia (US); Formats: LP · CD · digital download	4	15	14	7	27	5	9	5	7	23^{[C]}	UK: Platinum
From Out of Nowhere (as Jeff Lynne's ELO)	Released: 1 November 2019; Label: Columbia; Formats: LP · CD · digital download	1	12	10	14	34	29	26	13	14	47^{[D]}	UK: Silver

Notes

- B Also peaked at number 14 on the US Billboard Top Internet Albums chart.
- C Also peaked at number 2 on the US Billboard Top Rock Albums chart.
- D Also peaked at number 6 on the US Billboard Top Rock Albums and Top Album Sales charts.

=== Live albums ===
Title	Album details	Peak chart positions							Certifications
Title	Album details	UK	AUT	GER	NLD	SWE	SWI	US	Certifications
The Night the Light Went On in Long Beach	Released: May 1974; Label: Warner Bros.	—	—	—	—	—	—	—	
Live at Wembley '78	Released: 28 March 1998; Label: Eagle	—	—	—	—	—	—	—	
Live at Winterland '76	Released: 30 March 1998; Label: Eagle	—	—	—	—	—	—	—	
The BBC Sessions	Released: 1999; Label: Eagle	—	—	—	—	—	—	—	
Live at the BBC	Released: 28 June 1999; Label: Eagle	—	—	—	—	—	—	—	
Electric Light Orchestra Live	Released: 19 April 2013; Label: Frontiers	—	—	—	—	—	—	—	
Wembley or Bust (as Jeff Lynne's ELO)	Released: 17 November 2017; Label: Big Trilby	9	20	12	17	21	54	90	UK: Silver

=== Compilation albums ===
Charted or certified compilations

Title	Album details	Peak chart positions										Certifications
Title	Album details	UK	AUS	AUT	GER	NLD	NOR	NZ	SWE	SWI	US	Certifications
Showdown	Released: November 1974; Label: Harvest (UK)	—	—	—	—	—	—	—	—	—	—	
Olé ELO	Released: June 1976; Label: Jet (UK)	—	—	—	—	—	—	—	—	—	32	CAN: Platinum; US: Gold
The Light Shines On	Released: April 1977; Label: Harvest	—	—	—	—	—	—	—	—	—	—	UK: Silver
Three Light Years	Released: December 1978; Label: Jet	38	—	—	—	—	—	—	—	—	—	UK: Gold
The Light Shines On Vol 2	Released: April 1979; Label: Harvest	—	—	—	—	—	—	—	—	—	—	
ELO's Greatest Hits	Released: 23 November 1979; Label: Jet (UK) · CBS (US)	7	1	17	—	—	13	2	—	—	30	UK: Platinum; AUS: Platinum; CAN: Platinum; US: 4× Platinum
A Perfect World of Music	Released: 1985; Label: Jet	—	—	—	53	—	—	—	—	—	—	
All Over the World	Released: 1987; Label: Arcade	—	50	—	—	29	—	—	—	—	—	
The Greatest Hits	Released: 1989; Label: Telstar	23	—	—	—	—	—	—	22	—	—	UK: Gold
ELO's Greatest Hits Vol. 2	Released: 5 October 1992; Label: Epic	—	—	—	—	—	—	11	—	—	—	
The Very Best of the Electric Light Orchestra	Released: 20 June 1994; Label: Dino	4	15	—	—	—	—	—	—	—	—	UK: Gold
Light Years, The Very Best of Electric Light Orchestra	Released: 27 October 1997; Label: Epic	60	—	—	—	—	10	—	7	—	—	UK: Gold; NOR: Gold
Simply the Best of Electric Light Orchestra	Released: 1998 (Germany); Label: Epic (450377)	—	—	—	—	—	—	—	—	—	—	
The Ultimate Collection	Released: 8 May 2001; Label: Columbia	18	—	—	63	—	—	—	—	92	—	UK: Gold
All Over the World: The Very Best of Electric Light Orchestra	Released: 6 June 2005; Label: Epic	1	35	—	—	71	29	18	6	89	72^{[E]}	UK: 5× Platinum; AUS: Platinum; GER: Gold; US: Gold
The Collection	Released 9 March 2009; Label: Camden	—	—	—	—	—	—	—	—	—	—	UK: Silver
The Essential Electric Light Orchestra	Released: 10 October 2011; Label: Epic	—	—	—	—	—	—	—	—	58	—	UK: Silver; US: Gold
Mr. Blue Sky: The Very Best of Electric Light Orchestra	Released: 8 October 2012; Label: Frontiers	8	—	—	—	78	—	—	—	—	118^{[F]}	UK: Gold

Notes

- E First charted at #128 week of 1 September 2012 after the London Olympics opening and closing ceremonies featured "Mr. Blue Sky", peaked at #72 week of Nov 27, 2021.
- F Charted at #46 on the US Billboard Top Rock Albums and at #29 on the US Billboard Top Independent Albums charts.

Complete list

- Showdown (1974)
- Olé ELO (1976)
- Joyride (soundtrack) (1977)
- The Light Shines On (1977)
- The Light Shines On Vol 2 (1979)
- ELO's Greatest Hits (1979)
- The Best of ELO (Tellydisc, 1981)
- Eldorado/Electric Light Orchestra II (cassette only reissue) (1983)
- A Perfect World of Music (1985)
- First Movement (1986)
- All Over the World (1987)
- The Very Best of The Electric Light Orchestra (Telstar, 1989)
- The Very Best of The Electric Light Orchestra (Epic, 1990)
- ELO Classics (1990)
- The Very Best of ELO (Arcade, 1990)
  - The Very Best of ELO 1 (1990)
  - The Very Best of ELO 2 (1990)
- Early ELO: 1971–1973 (1991)
- ELO's Greatest Hits Vol. 2 (1992)
- Burning Bright (1992)
- The Very Best of the Electric Light Orchestra (Dino, 1994)
- Strange Magic: The Best of Electric Light Orchestra 2 CD (1995)
- The Gold Collection (EMI Gold, 1996)
  - The Best of Electric Light Orchestra (Disky, 1996)
- Light Years, The Very Best of Electric Light Orchestra 2 CD (1997)
  - The Danish Collection, The Very Best of Electric Light Orchestra (1997)
  - The Swedish Collection, The Very Best of Electric Light Orchestra (2000)
- Friends & Relatives (1999)
- Definitive Collection (1999)
- World Ballads: Electric Light Orchestra (1999)
- The Ultimate Collection 2 CD (2001)
- The Essential Electric Light Orchestra (2003)
- Early Years (2004)
- All Over the World: The Very Best of Electric Light Orchestra (2005)
- Harvest Showdown (2005)
- The Collection (2006)
- The Harvest Years: 1970–1973 (2006)
- Ticket to the Moon: The Very Best of Electric Light Orchestra Volume 2 (2007)
- ELO: Los Monstruos del Rock (2008)
- Playlist: The Very Best of Electric Light Orchestra (2008)
- The Collection (2009)
- The Very Best of Electric Light Orchestra (2011)
- The Essential Electric Light Orchestra 2 CD (2011)
- Mr. Blue Sky: The Very Best of Electric Light Orchestra - Jeff Lynne (2012)

=== Box sets ===
Title	Album details	Notes
Three Light Years	Released: December 1978; Label: Jet; Format: 3 LPs	The box set compiles On the Third Day, Eldorado and Face the Music in their entirety.
Four Light Years	Released: 1980; Label: Jet; Format: 4 LPs	The box set compiles A New World Record, Out of the Blue and Discovery in their entirety.
A Box of Their Best	Released: 7 August 1980; Label: Jet • Epic (PZX 36966); Formats: 4 LPs/1 7-inch single	The box set compiles A New World Record, Out of the Blue and Discovery in their entirety along with Lynne's first ever solo single "Doin' That Crazy Thing". This single, a single-sided single that was marked as a promo, was not in all releases of the box.
Afterglow	Released: 15 June 1990; Label: Epic (E3K 46090); Formats: 3 CDs and cassettes	The box set features songs from all Electric Light Orchestra albums with the exception of Xanadu, as well as rare b-sides and unreleased tracks from Time, Secret Messages originally intended double album and Balance of Power.
3-Pak	Released: 24 October 1995; Label: Sony Music Entertainment; Formats: 3 CDs	The box set compiles Face the Music, A New World Record and Discovery in their entirety.
Flashback	Released: 21 November 2000; Label: Epic/Legacy (3K 85123); Formats: 3 CDs	The box set features songs from all Electric Light Orchestra albums with previously unreleased tracks.
Original Album Classics	Released: 25 October 2010; Label: Epic/Legacy/Sony Music (88697787342); Formats: 5 CDs; US: Gold	The box set compiles On the Third Day, Face the Music, A New World Record, Discovery, and Time in their entirety, including bonus tracks.
The Classic Albums Collection	Released: 22 November 2011; Label: Sony Music/Epic/Legacy/EMI (88697873262); Formats: 11 CDs	The box set compiles all Electric Light Orchestra studio albums from The Electric Light Orchestra to Balance of Power (excluding Xanadu) in their entirety, including bonus tracks from 2006 reissues.
The UK Singles Volume One 1972–1978	Released: 21 September 2018; Label: Sony Music/Epic/Legacy (88985424617); Formats: 16 7-inch	The box set compiles fifteen Electric Light Orchestra 7-inch singles and one 7-inch EP originally released between 1972 and 1978.

== Extended plays ==
Title	EP details	Peak chart positions	
Title	EP details	UK	IRE
The ELO EP	Released: 9 December 1978 (UK); Label: Jet	34	15

== Singles ==
Note: Entry boxes containing "—" may pertain to any of the following:

- A single not being released in the territory
- Various charts listed had ceased to exist before particular singles were released
- Accurate but incomplete information
- Failure to chart

Title	Year	Chart positions										Certifications	Album
Title	Year	UK	AUS	AUT	CAN	FRA	GER	IRE	NLD	NZ	US	Certifications	Album
"10538 Overture"	1972	9	—	—	—	5	—	—	—	—	—		The Electric Light Orchestra/No Answer
"Roll Over Beethoven"	1973	6	53	—	19	—	22	—	19	—	42		ELO 2
"Showdown"	1973	12	—	—	47	—	—	—	25	—	53		On the Third Day (US versions only)
"Ma-Ma-Ma Belle"	1974	22	—	—	—	—	—	—	—	—	—		On the Third Day
"Daybreaker"	1974	—	—	—	57	—	—	—	—	—	87		On the Third Day
"Can't Get It Out of My Head"	1974	—	59	—	25	5	—	—	20	—	9		Eldorado
"Boy Blue"	1975	—	—	—	—	—	—	—	—	—	—		Eldorado
"Evil Woman"	1975	10	23	—	6	2	—	10	21	8	10	UK: Gold; US: Platinum	Face the Music
"Nightrider"	1976	—	—	—	—	—	—	—	—	—	—		Face the Music
"Strange Magic"	1976	38	85	—	42	10	—	—	—	—	14	US: Gold	Face the Music
"Showdown" (reissue)	1976	—	—	—	73	—	—	—	—	—	59		Olé ELO
"Livin' Thing" ^{[M]}	1976	4	2	3	8	9	5	6	4	4	13	UK: Platinum; US: Gold	A New World Record
"Rockaria!"	1977	9	10	7	—	—	—	—	23	—	—		A New World Record
"Do Ya"	1977	—	—	—	13	—	42	—	—	—	24		A New World Record
"Telephone Line"	1977	8	10	—	1	10	32	—	—	1	7	UK: Silver; US: Platinum; CAN: Gold	A New World Record
"Turn to Stone" ^{[N]}	1977	18	17	—	9	9	32	—	23	21	13	UK: Silver; US: Gold	Out of the Blue
"Mr. Blue Sky"	1978	6	87	—	26	—	27	28	8	—	35	UK: 5× Platinum; GER: Gold; US: 3× Platinum	Out of the Blue
"Wild West Hero"	1978	6	—	—	—	—	—	9	—	—	—	UK: Silver	Out of the Blue
"Sweet Talkin' Woman"	1978	6	38	27	16	—	—	6	24	—	17	UK: Silver; US: Gold	Out of the Blue
"It's Over"	1978	—	—	—	—	—	—	—	—	—	75		Out of the Blue
"Shine a Little Love"	1979	6	14	23	4	2	30	4	17	17	8	UK: Silver	Discovery
"The Diary of Horace Wimp"	1979	8	48	—	—	—	52	10	—	—	—	UK: Silver	Discovery
"Don't Bring Me Down"	1979	3	6	2	1	—	5	6	5	6	4	AUS: Gold; UK: Platinum; US: 2× Platinum	Discovery
"Confusion" ^{[G]}	1979	8	—	5	20	6	6	9	5	—	37	UK: Silver	Discovery
"Last Train to London" ^{[G]}	1979	8	—	—	28	3	—	9	—	—	39	UK: Silver	Discovery
"I'm Alive"	1980	20	27	—	10	9	16	10	38	—	16	US: Gold	Xanadu
"Xanadu" (featuring Olivia Newton-John)	1980	1	2	1	9	3	1	1	1	8	8	UK: Silver	Xanadu
"All Over the World"	1980	11	78	—	16	4	27	12	10	—	13	UK: Silver	Xanadu
"Don't Walk Away"	1980	21	—	—	—	—	52	7	—	—	—		Xanadu
"Hold On Tight"	1981	4	5	2	6	—	2	3	10	7	10	UK: Silver	Time
"Twilight"	1981	30	93	15	—	10	17	18	18	—	38		Time
"Rain Is Falling"	1982	—	—	—	—	—	—	—	—	—	—^{[H]}		Time
"Here Is the News/Ticket to the Moon"	1982	24	—	—	—	4	61	17	—	—	—		Time
"The Way Life's Meant to Be"	1982	85	—	—	—	—	30	—	—	—	—		Time
"Rock 'n' Roll Is King"	1983	13	13	16	6	—	17	4	8	—	19	CAN: Gold	Secret Messages
"Secret Messages"^{[K]}	1983	48	—	—	—	—	—	14	—	—	—		Secret Messages
"Four Little Diamonds"	1983	84	—	—	—	—	—	—	—	—	86		Secret Messages
"Train of Gold"	1983	—	—	—	—	—	—	—	—	—	—		Secret Messages
"Stranger"^{[L]}	1983	—	—	—	—	—	—	—	—	—	—^{[H]}		Secret Messages
"Buildings Have Eyes"	1983	—	—	—	—	—	—	—	—	—	—		Secret Messages
"Calling America"	1986	28	47	22	28	10	31	16	—	—	18		Balance of Power
"So Serious"	1986	77	—	—	—	—	—	—	—	—	—		Balance of Power
"Getting to the Point"	1986	97	—	—	—	—	—	—	—	—	—		Balance of Power
"Sorrow About to Fall"	1986	—	—	—	—	—	—	—	—	—	—		Balance of Power
"Destination Unknown" ^{[I]}	1990	—	—	—	—	—	—	—	—	—	—		Promo DJ single
"Alright"	2001	—	—	—	—	—	—	—	87	—	—		Zoom
"Moment in Paradise"	2001	—	—	—	—	—	—	—	—	—	—		Zoom
"Surrender" ^{[J]}	2006	81	—	—	—	—	—	—	—	—	—		A New World Record (30th Anniversary Edition)
"Latitude 88 North" ^{[J]}	2007	—	—	—	—	—	—	—	—	—	—		Out of the Blue (30th Anniversary Edition)
"When I Was a Boy" ^{[O]}	2015	—	—	—	—	—	—	—	—	—	—		Alone in the Universe
"When the Night Comes" ^{[O]}	2015	—	—	—	—	—	—	—	—	—	—		Alone in the Universe
"One Step at a Time" ^{[O]}	2015	—	—	—	—	—	—	—	—	—	—		Alone in the Universe
"Ain't It a Drag" ^{[O]}	2016	—	—	—	—	—	—	—	—	—	—		Alone in the Universe
"From Out of Nowhere" ^{[O]}	2019	—	—	—	—	—	—	—	—	—	—		From Out of Nowhere
"Time of Our Life" ^{[O]}	2019	—	—	—	—	—	—	—	—	—	—		From Out of Nowhere
Number-one songs		1	0	1	2	0	1	1	1	1	0		
Top-ten hits		15	6	6	10	18	5	13	8	5	7		

Notes

- G "Confusion" and "Last Train to London" were released as a double A-side in UK and Ireland.
- H Actually charted in the Bubbling Under Hot 100 Singles chart.
- I Promo DJ single.
- J Single available as a digital download and promo 7-inch format.
- M Though released in November 1976, it actually became a charting hit for the year 1977.
- N Though released in November 1977, it actually became a charting hit for the year 1978.
- O Single available as a digital download.

=== Peak positions on other US Billboard charts ===
Year	Title	US Mainstream Rock	US Adult Contemporary	Album
1976	"Strange Magic"	—	24	Face the Music
1977	"Livin' Thing"	—	36	A New World Record
1978	"Mr. Blue Sky"	—	—	Out of the Blue
1979	"Shine a Little Love"	—	40	Discovery
1979	"Confusion"	—	41	Discovery
1980	"I'm Alive"	—	48	Xanadu
1980	"Xanadu"	—	2	Xanadu
1980	"All Over the World"	—	46	Xanadu
1981	"Hold On Tight"	2	—	Time
1983	"Rock 'n' Roll Is King"	19	36	Secret Messages
1983	"Stranger"	—	33	Secret Messages
1986	"Calling America"	22	20	Balance of Power

=== Billboard Year-End performances ===
Year	Song	Year-End position
1975	"Can't Get It Out of My Head"	81
1976	"Evil Woman"	70
1977	"Telephone Line"	15
1977	"Livin' Thing"	77
1978	"Sweet Talkin' Woman"	86
1978	"Turn to Stone"	94
1979	"Shine a Little Love"	71
1979	"Don't Bring Me Down"	81
1981	"Hold On Tight"	81

=== American Top 40 year-end performances ===
Year	Song	Year-end position
1977	"Telephone Line"	22
1977	"Livin' Thing"	79
1980	"Xanadu"	93
1981	"Hold On Tight"	75

=== Opus year-end performances ===
Year	Song	Year-end position
1975	"Can't Get It Out of My Head"	72
1976	"Evil Woman"	60
1976	"Strange Magic"	97
1977	"Telephone Line"	38
1977	"Livin' Thing"	90
1978	"Sweet Talkin' Woman"	83
1979	"Shine a Little Love"	40
1979	"Don't Bring Me Down"	42
1980	"I'm Alive"	80
1980	"All Over the World"	54
1980	"Xanadu"	26
1981	"Hold On Tight"	61

=== Radio & Records ===
Year	Song	Peak position
1975	"Can't Get It Out of My Head"	27
1976	"Evil Woman"	5
1976	"Strange Magic"	17
1976	"Livin' Thing"	6
1977	"Do Ya"	27
1977	"Telephone Line"	4
1978	"Turn to Stone"	5
1978	"Sweet Talkin' Woman"	12
1979	"Shine a Little Love"	1
1979	"Don't Bring Me Down"	5
1980	"I'm Alive"	12
1980	"All Over the World"	8
1980	"Xanadu"	2
1981	"Hold On Tight"	6
1981	"Twilight"	25
1983	"Rock 'n' Roll Is King"	11
1986	"Calling America"	20

== Videos ==
=== Music videos ===
Year	Song	Director	Album
1972	"10538 Overture"	Unknown	The Electric Light Orchestra/No Answer
1973	"Roll Over Beethoven"	Unknown	ELO 2/Electric Light Orchestra II
1973	"Showdown"	Unknown	On the Third Day
1974	"Can't Get It Out of My Head"	Unknown	Eldorado, A Symphony
1975	"Evil Woman"	Unknown	Face the Music
1976	"Livin' Thing"	Unknown	A New World Record
1976	"Rockaria!"	Bruce Gowers	A New World Record
1976	"Do Ya"	Unknown	A New World Record
1976	"Telephone Line"	Unknown	A New World Record
1976	"Tightrope"	Unknown	A New World Record
1977	"Turn to Stone"	Mike Mansfield	Out of the Blue
1977	"Mr. Blue Sky"	Mike Mansfield	Out of the Blue
1977	"Sweet Talkin' Woman"	Mike Mansfield	Out of the Blue
1977	"It's Over"	Unknown	Out of the Blue
1977	"Wild West Hero" (live)	Unknown	Out of the Blue
1979	"Shine a Little Love"	Unknown	Discovery
1979	"Confusion"	Unknown	Discovery
1979	"Need Her Love"	Unknown	Discovery
1979	"The Diary of Horace Wimp"	Unknown	Discovery
1979	"Last Train to London"	Mike Mansfield	Discovery
1979	"Midnight Blue"	Unknown	Discovery
1979	"On the Run"	Unknown	Discovery
1979	"Wishing"	Unknown	Discovery
1979	"Don't Bring Me Down"	Mike Mansfield	Discovery
1981	"Twilight"	Unknown	Time
1981	"Ticket to the Moon"	Unknown	Time
1981	"Here Is the News"	Unknown	Time
1981	"Hold On Tight"	Mike Mansfield	Time
1983	"Secret Messages"	Unknown	Secret Messages
1983	"Rock 'n' Roll Is King"	Unknown	Secret Messages
1986	"So Serious"	Peter Christopherson	Balance of Power
1986	"Calling America"	John Beug & Jane Simpson	Balance of Power
2015	"When I Was a Boy"	Warren Fu	Alone in the Universe
2016	"Ain't It a Drag"	Unknown	Alone in the Universe
2019	"Time of Our Life"	Unknown	From Out of Nowhere

=== Video albums/concerts ===
Year	Title	Format(s)	Certifications
1979	Discovery	UK Betamax/VHS	
1980	Live at Wembley	Betamax/VHS	
1989	The "Out of the Blue" Tour – Live at Wembley	UK VHS	
1991	Fusion – Live in London	UK VHS	
1991	The Very Best of ELO	UK VHS	
1998	Out of the Blue Tour: Live at Wembley/Discovery	DVD/VHS	
2001	Zoom Tour Live	DVD/VHS	UK: Platinum; AUS: 2× Platinum
2005	Inside the Electric Light Orchestra 1970–1973	DVD	
2006	Out of the Blue: Live at Wembley (remastered)	DVD	UK: Gold
2006	ELO – Total Rock Review	DVD	
2010	In Performance	DVD	
2010	Live: The Early Years	DVD	
2015	Jeff Lynne's ELO: Live in Hyde Park	DVD/Blu-ray	UK: Gold
2017	Jeff Lynne's ELO: Wembley or Bust	CD/DVD/Blu-ray	

== See also ==
- List of songs recorded by Electric Light Orchestra
- ELO Part II discography
- The Orchestra discography
- The Move discography
- The Idle Race discography
- Traveling Wilburys discography
- Armchair Theatre
