= List of songs recorded by Electric Light Orchestra =

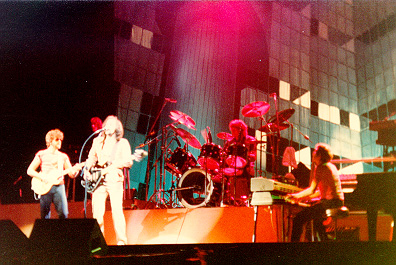
ELO performing live during their 1981 Time Tour. From left: Jeff Lynne, Louis Clark (obscured), Kelly Groucutt, Bev Bevan, and Richard Tandy

The English rock band Electric Light Orchestra (ELO) recorded over 190 songs from 1971 to 2019. The band's music is characterised by their blending of Beatlesque pop, classical arrangements, and futuristic iconography.

In 1971 the band released their self-titled debut album, The Electric Light Orchestra (No Answer in the US), the songwriting duties were split between band members Roy Wood and Jeff Lynne, Wood's songs were more classically influenced than Lynne's art rock influenced songs. Before the release of ELO 2 (1973, Electric Light Orchestra II in the US) Wood left the band, making Lynne the sole songwriter. The album contained a cover of the song "Roll Over Beethoven", the single would be a hit in the US. Later in 1973, On the Third Day marked when the band developed its sound and improvements in Lynne's songwriting. The concept album Eldorado (1974) saw the first time that an orchestra was used, where previously Lynne would overdub strings. The presence of an orchestra would be a common part of future ELO albums. The 1975 album Face the Music moved away from symphonic concept elements of Eldorado in favour of more radio friendly songs. The lead single from the album, "Evil Woman", became ELO's first worldwide hit.

== Songs ==
Name of song, writer(s), lead vocal(s), original release, and year of release
| Song | Writer(s) | Lead vocals(s) | Original release | Year Recorded | Year Released | Ref. |
|---|---|---|---|---|---|---|
| "10538 Overture" | Jeff Lynne | Jeff Lynne | The Electric Light Orchestra | 1971 | 1971 | |
| "21st Century Man" | Jeff Lynne | Jeff Lynne | Time | 1981 | 1981 | |
| "A Long Time Gone" | Jeff Lynne | Jeff Lynne | Zoom | 2001 | 2001 | |
| "A Matter of Fact" | Jeff Lynne | Jeff Lynne | B-side to "So Serious" | 1985 | 1986 | |
| "A Matter of Fact (alternate lyrics)" | Jeff Lynne | Jeff Lynne | B-side to "So Serious" | 1985 | 1986 | |
| "Above the Clouds" | Jeff Lynne | Jeff Lynne; Kelly Groucutt | A New World Record | 1976 | 1976 | |
| "Across the Border" | Jeff Lynne | Jeff Lynne | Out of the Blue | 1977 | 1977 | |
| "After All" | Jeff Lynne | Instrumental | B-side to "Rock 'n' Roll Is King" | 1983 | 1983 | |
| "Ain't It a Drag" | Jeff Lynne | Jeff Lynne | Alone in the Universe | 2015 | 2015 | |
| "All My Life" | Jeff Lynne | Jeff Lynne | Alone in the Universe | 2015 | 2015 | |
| "All My Love" | Jeff Lynne | Jeff Lynne | From Out of Nowhere | 2019 | 2019 | |
| "All Over the World" | Jeff Lynne | Jeff Lynne | Xanadu | 1980 | 1980 | |
| "All She Wanted" | Jeff Lynne | Jeff Lynne | Zoom | 2001 | 2001 | |
| "Alone in the Universe" | Jeff Lynne | Jeff Lynne | Alone in the Universe | 2015 | 2015 | |
| "Alright" | Jeff Lynne | Jeff Lynne | Zoom | 2001 | 2001 | |
| "Another Heart Breaks" | Jeff Lynne | Instrumental | Time | 1981 | 1981 | |
| "Baby I Apologise" (Note: Previously unreleased songs included on the 2003 30th anniversary edition of ELO 2.) | Jeff Lynne | Jeff Lynne | ELO 2 (First Light Series) | 1972 | 2003 | |
| "Believe Me Now" | Jeff Lynne | Instrumental | Out of the Blue | 1977 | 1977 | |
| "Big Wheels" | Jeff Lynne | Jeff Lynne | Out of the Blue | 1977 | 1977 | |
| "Birmingham Blues" | Jeff Lynne | Jeff Lynne | Out of the Blue | 1977 | 1977 | |
| "Blue" (Note: Bonus tracks included on the deluxe edition of Alone in the Universe.) | Jeff Lynne | Jeff Lynne | Alone in the Universe | 2015 | 2015 | |
| "Bluebird" | Jeff Lynne | Jeff Lynne | Secret Messages | 1983 | 1983 | |
| "Bluebird Is Dead" | Jeff Lynne | Jeff Lynne | On the Third Day | 1973 | 1973 | |
| "Boy Blue" | Jeff Lynne | Jeff Lynne | Eldorado | 1974 | 1974 | |
| "Buildings Have Eyes" | Jeff Lynne | Jeff Lynne | B-side to "Secret Messages" | 1983 | 1983 | |
| "Calling America" | Jeff Lynne | Jeff Lynne | Balance of Power | 1985 | 1986 | |
| "Can't Get It Out of My Head" | Jeff Lynne | Jeff Lynne | Eldorado | 1974 | 1974 | |
| "Caught in a Trap" | Jeff Lynne | Jeff Lynne | B-side to "Calling America" | 1985 | 1986 | |
| "Confusion" | Jeff Lynne | Jeff Lynne | Discovery | 1979 | 1979 | |
| "Danger Ahead" | Jeff Lynne | Jeff Lynne | Secret Messages | 1983 | 1983 | |
| "Daybreaker" | Jeff Lynne | Instrumental | On the Third Day | 1973 | 1973 | |
| "Destination Unknown" | Jeff Lynne | Jeff Lynne | B-side to "Calling America" and "So Serious" | 1985 | 1986 | |
| "Dirty to the Bone" | Jeff Lynne | Jeff Lynne | Alone in the Universe | 2015 | 2015 | |
| "Do Ya" | Jeff Lynne | Jeff Lynne | A New World Record | 1976 | 1976 | |
| "Don't Bring Me Down" | Jeff Lynne | Jeff Lynne | Discovery | 1979 | 1979 | |
| "Don't Walk Away" | Jeff Lynne | Jeff Lynne | Xanadu | 1980 | 1980 | |
| "Down Came the Rain" | Jeff Lynne | Jeff Lynne | From Out of Nowhere | 2019 | 2019 | |
| "Down Home Town" | Jeff Lynne | Jeff Lynne | Face the Music | 1975 | 1975 | |
| "Dreaming of 4000" | Jeff Lynne | Jeff Lynne | On the Third Day | 1973 | 1973 | |
| "Drum Dreams" | Jeff Lynne | Instrumental | B-side to "I'm Alive" and "All Over the World" | 1980 | 1980 | |
| "Easy Money" | Jeff Lynne | Jeff Lynne | Zoom | 2001 | 2001 | |
| "Eldorado" | Jeff Lynne | Jeff Lynne | Eldorado | 1974 | 1974 | |
| "Eldorado Finale" | Jeff Lynne | Spoken word | Eldorado | 1974 | 1974 | |
| "Eldorado Instrumental Medley" (Note: Previously unreleased song included on the 2001 edition of Eldorado.) | Jeff Lynne | Instrumental | Eldorado | 1974 | 2001 | |
| "Eldorado Overture" | Jeff Lynne | Spoken word | Eldorado | 1974 | 1974 | |
| "Endless Lies" | Jeff Lynne | Jeff Lynne | Balance of Power | 1985 | 1986 | |
| "Epilogue" | Jeff Lynne | Jeff Lynne | Time | 1981 | 1981 | |
| "Everyone's Born to Die" | Jeff Lynne | Jeff Lynne | ELO 2 (First Light Series) | 1972 | 2003 | |
| "Evil Woman" | Jeff Lynne | Jeff Lynne | Face the Music | 1975 | 1975 | |
| "Fault Line" | Jeff Lynne | Jeff Lynne | Alone in the Universe | 2015 | 2015 | |
| "Fire on High" | Jeff Lynne | Instrumental | Face the Music | 1975 | 1975 | |
| "First Movement (Jumping Biz)" | Roy Wood | Instrumental | The Electric Light Orchestra | 1971 | 1971 | |
| "Four Little Diamonds" | Jeff Lynne | Jeff Lynne | Secret Messages | 1983 | 1983 | |
| "From Out of Nowhere" | Jeff Lynne | Jeff Lynne | From Out of Nowhere | 2019 | 2019 | |
| "From the End of the World" | Jeff Lynne | Jeff Lynne | Time | 1981 | 1981 | |
| "From the Sun to the World (Boogie No. 1)" | Jeff Lynne | Jeff Lynne | ELO 2 | 1972 | 1973 | |
| "Get a Hold of Myself (Take 2)" | Jeff Lynne | Carl Wayne | ELO 2 (First Light Series) | 1972 | 2003 | |
| "Getting to the Point" | Jeff Lynne | Jeff Lynne | Balance of Power | 1985 | 1986 | |
| "Goin' Out on Me" | Jeff Lynne | Jeff Lynne | From Out of Nowhere | 2019 | 2019 | |
| "Grieg's Piano Concerto In A Minor" | Edvard Grieg | Instrumental | Flashback | 1983 | 2000 | |
| "Heaven Only Knows" | Jeff Lynne | Jeff Lynne | Balance of Power | 1985 | 1986 | |
| "Hello My Old Friend" | Jeff Lynne | Jeff Lynne | Afterglow | 1983 | 1990 | |
| "Help Yourself" | Jeff Lynne | Jeff Lynne | From Out of Nowhere | 2019 | 2019 | |
| "Helpless" | Jeff Lynne | Jeff Lynne | Flashback | 2000 | 2000 | |
| "Here Is the News" | Jeff Lynne | Jeff Lynne | Time | 1981 | 1981 | |
| "Hold On Tight" | Jeff Lynne | Jeff Lynne | Time | 1981 | 1981 | |
| "I'm Alive" | Jeff Lynne | Jeff Lynne | Xanadu | 1980 | 1980 | |
| "I'm Leaving You" | Jeff Lynne | Jeff Lynne | Alone in the Universe | 2015 | 2015 | |
| "Illusions in G Major" | Jeff Lynne | Jeff Lynne | Eldorado | 1974 | 1974 | |
| "In For The Kill" (Note: Bonus track included on the 2007 edition of Balance of Power.) | Jeff Lynne | Jeff Lynne | Balance of Power | 1985 | 2007 | |
| "In My Own Time" | Jeff Lynne | Jeff Lynne | Zoom | 2001 | 2001 | |
| "In Old England Town (Boogie No. 2)" | Jeff Lynne | Jeff Lynne | ELO 2 | 1972 | 1973 | |
| "In Old England Town (Instrumental)" | Jeff Lynne | Instrumental | B-side to "Showdown" | 1973 | 1973 | |
| "In the Hall of the Mountain King" | Edvard Grieg | Instrumental | On the Third Day | 1973 | 1973 | |
| "Indian Queen (Demo)" | Jeff Lynne | Jeff Lynne | Flashback | 1973 | 2000 | |
| "Interludes" (Note: Previously unreleased song included on the 2006 edition of On the Third Day.) | Jeff Lynne | Instrumental | On the Third Day | 1973 | 2006 | |
| "Is It Alright" | Jeff Lynne | Jeff Lynne | Balance of Power | 1985 | 1986 | |
| "It Really Doesn't Matter" | Jeff Lynne | Jeff Lynne | Zoom | 2001 | 2001 | |
| "It's Over" | Jeff Lynne | Jeff Lynne | Out of the Blue | 1977 | 1977 | |
| "Julie Don't Live Here" | Jeff Lynne | Jeff Lynne | B-side to "Twilight" | 1981 | 1981 | |
| "Jungle" | Jeff Lynne | Jeff Lynne | Out of the Blue | 1977 | 1977 | |
| "Just for Love" | Jeff Lynne | Jeff Lynne | Zoom | 2001 | 2001 | |
| "Kuiama" | Jeff Lynne | Jeff Lynne | ELO 2 | 1972 | 1973 | |
| "Laredo Tornado" | Jeff Lynne | Jeff Lynne | Eldorado | 1974 | 1974 | |
| "Last Train to London" | Jeff Lynne | Jeff Lynne | Discovery | 1979 | 1979 | |
| "Latitude 88 North" (Note: Previously unreleased songs included on the 2007 30th anniversary edition of Out of the Blue.) | Jeff Lynne | Jeff Lynne | Out of the Blue | 1977 | 2007 | |
| "Letter from Spain" | Jeff Lynne | Jeff Lynne | Secret Messages | 1983 | 1983 | |
| "Little Town Flirt" (Note: Previously unreleased songs included on the 2001 edition of Discovery.) | Maron McKenzie; Del Shannon | Jeff Lynne | Discovery | 1979 | 2001 | |
| "Livin' Thing" | Jeff Lynne | Jeff Lynne | A New World Record | 1976 | 1976 | |
| "Lonesome Lullaby" | Jeff Lynne | Jeff Lynne | Zoom | 2001 | 2001 | |
| "Long Black Road" (Note: Japanese bonus track included on the 2013 edition of Zoom.) | Jeff Lynne | Jeff Lynne | Zoom | 2001 | 2001 | |
| "Look at Me Now" | Roy Wood | Roy Wood | The Electric Light Orchestra | 1971 | 1971 | |
| "Loser Gone Wild" | Jeff Lynne | Jeff Lynne | Secret Messages | 1983 | 1983 | |
| "Losing You" | Jeff Lynne | Jeff Lynne | From Out of Nowhere | 2019 | 2019 | |
| "Love and Rain" | Jeff Lynne | Jeff Lynne | Alone in the Universe | 2015 | 2015 | |
| "Love Changes All" | Jeff Lynne | Jeff Lynne | Flashback | 1980 | 2000 | |
| "Ma-Ma-Ma Belle" | Jeff Lynne | Jeff Lynne | On the Third Day | 1973 | 1973 | |
| "Mambo (Dreaming of 4000)" | Jeff Lynne | Jeff Lynne | ELO 2 (First Light Series) | 1972 | 2003 | |
| "Mandalay" | Jeff Lynne | Jeff Lynne | Afterglow | 1983 | 1990 | |
| "Manhattan Rumble (49th Street Massacre)" | Jeff Lynne | Instrumental | The Electric Light Orchestra | 1971 | 1971 | |
| "Melting in the Sun" | Jeff Lynne | Jeff Lynne | Zoom | 2001 | 2001 | |
| "Midnight Blue" | Jeff Lynne | Jeff Lynne | Discovery | 1979 | 1979 | |
| "Mission (A World Record)" | Jeff Lynne | Jeff Lynne | A New World Record | 1976 | 1976 | |
| "Mister Kingdom" | Jeff Lynne | Jeff Lynne | Eldorado | 1974 | 1974 | |
| "Moment in Paradise" | Jeff Lynne | Jeff Lynne | Zoom | 2001 | 2001 | |
| "Momma" | Jeff Lynne | Jeff Lynne | ELO 2 | 1972 | 1973 | |
| "Mr. Blue Sky" | Jeff Lynne | Jeff Lynne | Out of the Blue | 1977 | 1977 | |
| "Mr. Radio" | Jeff Lynne | Jeff Lynne | The Electric Light Orchestra | 1971 | 1971 | |
| "Need Her Love" | Jeff Lynne | Jeff Lynne | Discovery | 1979 | 1979 | |
| "Nellie Takes Her Bow" | Jeff Lynne | Jeff Lynne | The Electric Light Orchestra | 1971 | 1971 | |
| "New World Rising/Ocean Breakup (Reprise)" | Jeff Lynne | Jeff Lynne | On the Third Day | 1973 | 1973 | |
| "Night in the City" | Jeff Lynne | Jeff Lynne | Out of the Blue | 1977 | 1977 | |
| "Nightrider" | Jeff Lynne | Jeff Lynne; Kelly Groucutt | Face the Music | 1975 | 1975 | |
| "No Way Out" | Jeff Lynne | Jeff Lynne | Afterglow | 1985 | 1990 | |
| "Nobody's Child" | Jeff Lynne | Jeff Lynne | Eldorado | 1974 | 1974 | |
| "Ocean Breakup/King of the Universe" | Jeff Lynne | Jeff Lynne | On the Third Day | 1973 | 1973 | |
| "Oh No Not Susan" | Jeff Lynne | Jeff Lynne | On the Third Day | 1973 | 1973 | |
| "On My Mind" (Note: Japanese bonus track included on Alone in the Universe.) | Jeff Lynne | Jeff Lynne | Alone in the Universe | 2015 | 2015 | |
| "On the Run" | Jeff Lynne | Jeff Lynne | Discovery | 1979 | 1979 | |
| "One Day" (2013 remaster bonus track) | Jeff Lynne | Jeff Lynne | Zoom | 2001 | 2004 | |
| "One More Time" | Jeff Lynne | Jeff Lynne | From Out of Nowhere | 2019 | 2019 | |
| "One Step at a Time" | Jeff Lynne | Jeff Lynne | Alone in the Universe | 2015 | 2015 | |
| "One Summer Dream" | Jeff Lynne | Jeff Lynne | Face the Music | 1975 | 1975 | |
| "Ordinary Dream" | Jeff Lynne | Jeff Lynne | Zoom | 2001 | 2001 | |
| "Point of No Return" | Jeff Lynne | Jeff Lynne | Mr. Blue Sky: The Very Best of Electric Light Orchestra | 2012 | 2012 | |
| "Poker" | Jeff Lynne | Kelly Groucutt | Face the Music | 1975 | 1975 | |
| "Poor Boy (The Greenwood)" | Jeff Lynne | Jeff Lynne | Eldorado | 1974 | 1974 | |
| "Prologue" | Jeff Lynne | Jeff Lynne | Time | 1981 | 1981 | |
| "Queen of the Hours" | Jeff Lynne | Jeff Lynne | The Electric Light Orchestra | 1971 | 1971 | |
| "Rain Is Falling" | Jeff Lynne | Jeff Lynne | Time | 1981 | 1981 | |
| "Rock 'n' Roll Is King" | Jeff Lynne | Jeff Lynne | Secret Messages | 1983 | 1983 | |
| "Rockaria!" | Jeff Lynne | Jeff Lynne; Mary Thomas | A New World Record | 1976 | 1976 | |
| "Roll Over Beethoven" | Chuck Berry; Ludwig van Beethoven | Jeff Lynne | ELO 2 | 1972 | 1973 | |
| "Sci-Fi Woman" | Jeff Lynne | Jeff Lynne | From Out of Nowhere | 2019 | 2019 | |
| "Second Time Around (Home Demo)" | Jeff Lynne | Jeff Lynne | Discovery | 1979 | 2001 | |
| "Secret Lives" | Jeff Lynne | Jeff Lynne | Balance of Power | 1985 | 1986 | |
| "Secret Messages" | Jeff Lynne | Jeff Lynne | Secret Messages | 1983 | 1983 | |
| "Send It" | Jeff Lynne | Jeff Lynne | Balance of Power | 1985 | 1986 | |
| "Shangri-La" | Jeff Lynne | Jeff Lynne | A New World Record | 1976 | 1976 | |
| "Shine a Little Love" | Jeff Lynne | Jeff Lynne | Discovery | 1979 | 1979 | |
| "Showdown" | Jeff Lynne | Jeff Lynne | On the Third Day | 1973 | 1973 | |
| "So Fine" | Jeff Lynne | Jeff Lynne; Kelly Groucutt | A New World Record | 1976 | 1976 | |
| "So Serious" | Jeff Lynne | Jeff Lynne | Balance of Power | 1985 | 1986 | |
| "Songbird" | Jeff Lynne | Jeff Lynne | From Out of Nowhere | 2019 | 2019 | |
| "Sorrow About to Fall" | Jeff Lynne | Jeff Lynne | Balance of Power | 1985 | 1986 | |
| "Standin' in the Rain" | Jeff Lynne | Jeff Lynne | Out of the Blue | 1977 | 1977 | |
| "Starlight" | Jeff Lynne | Jeff Lynne | Out of the Blue | 1977 | 1977 | |
| "State of Mind" | Jeff Lynne | Jeff Lynne | Zoom | 2001 | 2001 | |
| "Steppin' Out" | Jeff Lynne | Jeff Lynne | Out of the Blue | 1977 | 1977 | |
| "Strange Magic" | Jeff Lynne | Jeff Lynne | Face the Music | 1975 | 1975 | |
| "Stranger" | Jeff Lynne | Jeff Lynne | Secret Messages | 1983 | 1983 | |
| "Stranger on a Quiet Street" | Jeff Lynne | Jeff Lynne | Zoom | 2001 | 2001 | |
| "Summer and Lightning" | Jeff Lynne | Jeff Lynne | Out of the Blue | 1977 | 1977 | |
| "Surrender" (Note: Previously unreleased song included on the 2006 edition of A New World Record.) | Jeff Lynne | Jeff Lynne | A New World Record | 1976 | 2006 | |
| "Sweet Is the Night" | Jeff Lynne | Jeff Lynne; Kelly Groucutt | Out of the Blue | 1977 | 1977 | |
| "Sweet Talkin' Woman" | Jeff Lynne | Jeff Lynne | Out of the Blue | 1977 | 1977 | |
| "Take Me on and On" | Jeff Lynne | Jeff Lynne | Secret Messages | 1983 | 1983 | |
| "Tears in Your Life" | Jeff Lynne | Jeff Lynne | Flashback | 1983 | 2000 | |
| "Telephone Line" | Jeff Lynne | Jeff Lynne | A New World Record | 1976 | 1976 | |
| "The Battle of Marston Moor (2 July 1644)" | Roy Wood | Roy Wood | The Electric Light Orchestra | 1971 | 1971 | |
| "The Bouncer" | Jeff Lynne | Jeff Lynne | B-side to "Four Little Diamonds" | 1983 | 1983 | |
| "The Diary of Horace Wimp" | Jeff Lynne | Jeff Lynne | Discovery | 1979 | 1979 | |
| "The Fall" | Jeff Lynne | Jeff Lynne | Xanadu | 1980 | 1980 | |
| "The Lights Go Down" | Jeff Lynne | Jeff Lynne | Time | 1981 | 1981 | |
| "The Quick and the Daft" | Jeff Lynne | Jeff Lynne | Out of the Blue | 1977 | 2007 | |
| "The Sun Will Shine on You" | Jeff Lynne | Jeff Lynne | Alone in the Universe | 2015 | 2015 | |
| "The Way Life's Meant to Be" | Jeff Lynne | Jeff Lynne | Time | 1981 | 1981 | |
| "The Whale" | Jeff Lynne | Instrumental | Out of the Blue | 1977 | 1977 | |
| "Ticket to the Moon" | Jeff Lynne | Jeff Lynne | Time | 1981 | 1981 | |
| "Tightrope" | Jeff Lynne | Jeff Lynne | A New World Record | 1976 | 1976 | |
| "Time After Time" | Jeff Lynne | Jeff Lynne | Secret Messages | 1983 | 1983 | |
| "Time of Our Life" | Jeff Lynne | Jeff Lynne | From Out of Nowhere | 2019 | 2019 | |
| "Train of Gold" | Jeff Lynne | Jeff Lynne | Secret Messages | 1983 | 1983 | |
| "Turn to Stone" | Jeff Lynne | Jeff Lynne | Out of the Blue | 1977 | 1977 | |
| "Twilight" | Jeff Lynne | Jeff Lynne | Time | 1981 | 1981 | |
| "Waterfall" | Jeff Lynne | Jeff Lynne | Face the Music | 1975 | 1975 | |
| "When I Was a Boy" | Jeff Lynne | Jeff Lynne | Alone in the Universe | 2015 | 2015 | |
| "When the Night Comes" | Jeff Lynne | Jeff Lynne | Alone in the Universe | 2015 | 2015 | |
| "When Time Stood Still" | Jeff Lynne | Jeff Lynne | B-side to "Hold On Tight" | 1981 | 1981 | |
| "Whisper in the Night" | Roy Wood | Roy Wood | The Electric Light Orchestra | 1971 | 1971 | |
| "Who's That?" | Jeff Lynne | Jeff Lynne | Flashback | 1983 | 2000 | |
| "Wild West Hero" | Jeff Lynne | Jeff Lynne | Out of the Blue | 1977 | 1977 | |
| "Wilf's Solo (Instrumental)" | Wilfred Gibson | Instrumental | ELO 2 (First Light Series) | 1972 | 2003 | |
| "Wishing" | Jeff Lynne | Jeff Lynne | Discovery | 1979 | 1979 | |
| "Without Someone" | Jeff Lynne | Jeff Lynne | Balance of Power | 1985 | 1986 | |
| "Xanadu" | Jeff Lynne | Olivia Newton-John | Xanadu | 1980 | 1980 | |
| "Xanadu (New Version)" | Jeff Lynne | Jeff Lynne | Flashback | 1980 | 2000 | |
| "Your World (Take 2)" | Jeff Lynne | Carl Wayne | ELO 2 (First Light Series) | 1972 | 2003 | |
| "Yours Truly, 2095" | Jeff Lynne | Jeff Lynne | Time | 1981 | 1981 | |

== Unreleased songs ==
Name of song, writer, intended release, and year of recording
| Song | Writer | Intended release | Year recorded | Ref. |
|---|---|---|---|---|
| "Beatles Forever" | Jeff Lynne | Secret Messages | 1982 | |
| "The First Days Of September" | Jeff Lynne | Eldorado | 1974 | |
| "O So Lonely" | Jeff Lynne | B-side to a Face the Music Single | 1974 | |
| "Rat up a Drain" | Jeff Lynne | B-side to a Face the Music Single | 1974 | |
| "Supersonic" | Jeff Lynne | Intro for Supersonic (TV series) | 1977 | |
| "Up Up and Away" | Jeff Lynne | Recorded around the ELO 2 Takes | 1972 | |
