= The Essential Electric Light Orchestra =

2003 compilation album by Electric Light Orchestra

Greatest hits album by Electric Light Orchestra
- Released: 1 April 2003
- Recorded: September 1972 – January 1986
- Genre: Rock
- Length: 60:58
- Label: Epic
- Producer: Jeff Lynne

Electric Light Orchestra chronology
ELO 2 (First Light Series) (2003)	The Essential Electric Light Orchestra (2003)	All Over the World: The Very Best of Electric Light Orchestra (2005)

Playlist: The Very Best of Electric Light Orchestra (2008)

Professional ratings
Review scores
Source	Rating
AllMusic	5/5 stars
The Music Box	4/5 stars
The Rolling Stone Album Guide	3.5/5 stars

The Essential Electric Light Orchestra is a 15-track, single-CD, US-only compilation album by the Electric Light Orchestra (ELO), released in 2003. It is part of Sony Music's The Essential series.

On 2 September 2008, an eco-friendly repackaging of the album, retitled Playlist: The Very Best of Electric Light Orchestra, was released. This edition includes a multimedia section on the CD that features photos, credits, and two wallpapers.

A third edition of the album was released in 2011. This version features 37 tracks on two discs, arranged in chronological order. It was the third ELO compilation to present the songs in chronological order, preceded by the US releases Olé ELO in 1976 and Strange Magic: The Best of Electric Light Orchestra in 1995.

Each edition of the album features a different cover.

== Track listing ==
All tracks are written by Jeff Lynne, except "Roll Over Beethoven", which was written by Chuck Berry.

=== Original Edition ===
No.	Title	Original Album	Length
1.	"Evil Woman" (UK Single Edit)	Face the Music (1975)	4:19
2.	"Do Ya"	A New World Record (1976)	3:47
3.	"Can't Get It Out of My Head"	Eldorado (1974)	4:26
4.	"Mr. Blue Sky"	Out of the Blue (1977)	5:08
5.	"Strange Magic" (UK Single Edit)	Face the Music (1975)	4:07
6.	"Livin' Thing"	A New World Record (1976)	3:33
7.	"Turn to Stone"	Out of the Blue (1977)	3:48
8.	"Sweet Talkin' Woman"	Out of the Blue (1977)	3:49
9.	"Telephone Line"	A New World Record (1976)	4:40
10.	"Shine a Little Love"	Discovery (1979)	4:42
11.	"Hold on Tight"	Time (1981)	3:08
12.	"Calling America"	Balance of Power (1986)	3:28
13.	"Rock 'n' Roll Is King" (Edit)	Secret Messages (1983)	3:17
14.	"Don't Bring Me Down"	Discovery (1979)	4:04
15.	"Roll Over Beethoven" (Single Edit)	ELO 2 (1973)	4:33
Total length:			60:58

=== 2011 edition ===
Essential Electric Light Orchestra 2CD

Greatest hits album by Electric Light Orchestra
- Released: 10 October 2011 (UK/Europe), 24 October 2011 (US)
- Recorded: 1970–2007
- Genre: Rock
- Length: 144:56
- Label: Epic, Legacy, Sony Music
- Producer: Jeff Lynne

Electric Light Orchestra chronology
Ticket to the Moon: The Very Best of Electric Light Orchestra Volume 2 (2007)	Essential Electric Light Orchestra 2CD (2011)	Mr. Blue Sky: The Very Best of Electric Light Orchestra (2012)

2-Disc Edition UK album cover

Disc one
No.	Title	Original Album	Length
1.	"10538 Overture" (Single Edit)	The Electric Light Orchestra (1971)	4:05
2.	"Roll Over Beethoven" (Single Edit)	ELO 2 (1973)	4:33
3.	"Showdown"	On the Third Day (1973)	4:10
4.	"Ma-Ma-Ma Belle" (Single Edit)	On the Third Day (1973)	3:38
5.	"Can't Get It Out of My Head" (Single Edit)	Eldorado (1974)	3:08
6.	"Evil Woman" (UK Single Edit)	Face the Music (1975)	4:13
7.	"Nightrider" (Single Edit)	Face the Music (1975)	3:43
8.	"Strange Magic" (UK Single Edit)	Face the Music (1975)	4:08
9.	"Livin' Thing"	A New World Record (1976)	3:33
10.	"Do Ya"	A New World Record (1976)	3:46
11.	"Rockaria!"	A New World Record (1976)	3:13
12.	"Telephone Line"	A New World Record (1976)	4:41
13.	"Turn to Stone"	Out of the Blue (1977)	3:50
14.	"Mr. Blue Sky"	Out of the Blue (1977)	5:04
15.	"Sweet Talkin' Woman"	Out of the Blue (1977)	3:49
16.	"Wild West Hero"	Out of the Blue (1977)	4:43
17.	"It's Over"	Out of the Blue (1977)	4:10
18.	"Shine a Little Love" (Single Edit)	Discovery (1979)	4:11
Total length:			72:36

Disc two
No.	Title	Original Album	Length
1.	"Don't Bring Me Down"	Discovery (1979)	4:04
2.	"The Diary of Horace Wimp"	Discovery (1979)	4:17
3.	"Confusion"	Discovery (1979)	3:40
4.	"Last Train to London"	Discovery (1979)	4:32
5.	"I'm Alive"	Xanadu (1980)	3:44
6.	"Xanadu (New Version)"	Flashback (2000)	3:22
7.	"All Over the World"	Xanadu (1980)	4:03
8.	"Don't Walk Away"	Xanadu (1980)	4:47
9.	"Hold on Tight"	Time (1981)	3:08
10.	"Twilight"	Time (1981)	3:45
11.	"Ticket to the Moon"	Time (1981)	4:08
12.	"The Way Life's Meant to Be"	Time (1981)	4:40
13.	"Rock 'n' Roll Is King" (Single Edit)	Secret Messages (1983)	3:08
14.	"Secret Messages"	Secret Messages (1983)	4:45
15.	"Four Little Diamonds"	Secret Messages (1983)	4:07
16.	"Calling America"	Balance of Power (1986)	3:31
17.	"So Serious"	Balance of Power (1986)	2:44
18.	"Surrender"	A New World Record: 30th Anniversary Edition (2006)	2:33
19.	"Latitude 88 North"	Out of the Blue: 30th Anniversary Edition (2007)	3:23
Total length:			72:20

== Charts ==
Chart (2003)	Peak position
Switzerland Swiss Hitparade	58

== Certifications ==
Region	Certification	Certified units/sales
United Kingdom (BPI)	Silver	60,000^{‡}
United States (RIAA)	Gold	500,000^{‡}
^{‡} Sales+streaming figures based on certification alone.
