= ELO's Greatest Hits Vol. 2 =

Greatest hits album by Electric Light Orchestra
- Released: 5 October 1992
- Recorded: May 1977 – January 1986
- Genre: Rock
- Label: Epic 471956
- Producer: Jeff Lynne

Electric Light Orchestra chronology
Afterglow (1990)	ELO's Greatest Hits Vol. 2 (1992)	The Very Best of the Electric Light Orchestra (1994)

Professional ratings
Review scores
Source	Rating
Allmusic	2/5 stars

ELO's Greatest Hits Vol. 2 is an album by the Electric Light Orchestra (ELO), released in 1992 as a follow-up to their more successful ELO's Greatest Hits, though it was not issued in the U.S.

== Track listing ==
All tracks are written by Jeff Lynne

No.	Title	Original album	Length
1.	"Rock 'n' Roll Is King"	Secret Messages (1983)
2.	"Hold on Tight"	Time (1981)
3.	"All Over the World"	Xanadu (1980)
4.	"Wild West Hero"	Out of the Blue (1977)
5.	"The Diary of Horace Wimp"	Discovery (1979)
6.	"Shine a Little Love"	Discovery (1979)
7.	"Confusion"	Discovery (1979)
8.	"Ticket to the Moon"	Time (1981)
9.	"Don't Bring Me Down"	Discovery (1979)
10.	"I'm Alive"	Xanadu (1980)
11.	"Last Train to London"	Discovery (1979)
12.	"Don't Walk Away"	Xanadu (1980)
13.	"Here Is The News"	Time (1981)
14.	"Calling America"	Balance of Power (1986)
15.	"Twilight"	Time (1981)
16.	"Secret Messages"	Secret Messages (1983)

== Personnel ==
- Jeff Lynne – lead vocals & backing vocals, acoustic guitar, electric guitar and slide guitars, percussion, synthesizer, piano
- Bev Bevan – drums, percussion, backing vocals
- Richard Tandy – piano, synthesizer, keyboards, electric guitar, clavinet, grand piano, Mellotron, percussion, backing vocals
- Kelly Groucutt – vocals, bass guitar, percussion, backing vocals (except on "Calling America")

=== Additional ===
- Mik Kaminski – violin on "Rock n' Roll Is King"
- Melvyn Gale – jangle piano on "Wild West Hero"
- Louis Clark – string arrangements, conductor on "Discovery" & "Xanadu" tracks
- Rainer Pietsch – conductor on "Time" tracks
- Dave Morgan – additional backing vocals on "Rock n' Roll Is King"

== Charts ==
Chart (1992)	Peak position
New Zealand Albums (RMNZ)	11
