= The Ultimate Collection (Electric Light Orchestra album) =

Compilation album by Electric Light Orchestra
- Released: 8 May 2001
- Recorded: June 1970 – January 1986
- Genre: Rock
- Label: Sony Records STVCD126
- Producer: Jeff Lynne

Electric Light Orchestra chronology
Flashback (2000)	The Ultimate Collection (2001)	Zoom (2001)

The Ultimate Collection is a two disc Compilation album by Electric Light Orchestra (ELO) released in 2001.

== Track list ==
All tracks are written by Jeff Lynne, with the exception of Roll Over Beethoven by Chuck Berry.

Disc 1
No.	Title	Length
1.	"Hold on Tight"	3:06
2.	"Rock 'n' Roll Is King" (7" edit)	3:05
3.	"Calling America"	3:28
4.	"I'm Alive"	3:43
5.	"Confusion"	3:40
6.	"Last Train to London"	4:32
7.	"Do Ya"	3:45
8.	"Showdown"	4:10
9.	"The Way Life's Meant to Be"	4:39
10.	"Turn to Stone"	3:48
11.	"Here Is the News"	3:44
12.	"Evil Woman"	4:15
13.	"Can't Get It Out of My Head" (7" edit)	4:26
14.	"Shine a Little Love" (7" edit)	4:10
15.	"Strange Magic" (7" edit)	4:07
16.	"Twilight"	3:42
17.	"Wild West Hero"	4:40
18.	"Nightrider" (7" edit)	3:43
19.	"Xanadu"	3:27

Disc 2
No.	Title	Length
1.	"Don't Bring Me Down"	4:03
2.	"Livin' Thing"	3:32
3.	"All Over the World"	4:01
4.	"Mr. Blue Sky"	5:03
5.	"Sweet Talkin' Woman"	3:47
6.	"Don't Walk Away"	4:39
7.	"10538 Overture" (7" edit)	3:56
8.	"Secret Messages"	3:34
9.	"Ticket to the Moon"	4:07
10.	"Telephone Line"	4:41
11.	"Ma-Ma-Ma Belle" (7" edit)	3:11
12.	"Rockaria!" (7" edit)	3:14
13.	"Getting to the Point"	4:29
14.	"Across the Border"	3:51
15.	"Roll Over Beethoven" (7" edit)	4:34
16.	"So Serious"	2:41
17.	"Illusions in G Major"	2:38
18.	"The Diary of Horace Wimp"	4:17
19.	"Four Little Diamonds"	4:06

== Charts ==
Chart (2001)	Peak position
German Albums (Offizielle Top 100)	63
Scottish Albums (OCC)	18
Swiss Albums (Schweizer Hitparade)	92
UK Albums (OCC)	18

== Certifications ==
Region	Certification	Certified units/sales
United Kingdom (BPI)	Gold	100,000^{^}
^{^} Shipments figures based on certification alone.
