= Ticket to the Moon: The Very Best of Electric Light Orchestra Volume 2 =

Greatest hits album by Electric Light Orchestra
- Released: 15 October 2007
- Recorded: 1974–2007
- Genre: Rock
- Length: 79:22
- Label: Legacy, Epic
- Producer: Jeff Lynne

Electric Light Orchestra chronology
All Over the World: The Very Best of Electric Light Orchestra (2005)	Ticket to the Moon: The Very Best of Electric Light Orchestra Volume 2 (2007)	The Essential Electric Light Orchestra (2 CD Edition) (2011)

Professional ratings
Review scores
Source	Rating
AllMusic	4/5 stars

Ticket to the Moon: The Very Best of Electric Light Orchestra Volume 2 is a 2007 compilation album by Electric Light Orchestra, and is a companion to 2005's All Over the World.

The album features most, although not all post-1973 UK singles that did not make the first album, together with band leader and songwriter Jeff Lynne's input of best album tracks, though still not featuring the albums The Electric Light Orchestra and ELO 2.

== Track listing ==
All tracks written by Jeff Lynne.

Ticket to the Moon: The Very Best of Electric Light Orchestra Volume 2 track listing
No.	Title	Original album	Length
1.	"Twilight"	Time, 1981	3:43
2.	"Do Ya"	A New World Record, 1976	3:45
3.	"Can't Get It Out of My Head"	Eldorado, 1974	4:22
4.	"Latitude 88 North"	30th Anniversary Edition of Out of the Blue, 1977	3:23
5.	"It's Over"	Out of the Blue	4:09
6.	"Ticket to the Moon"	Time	4:07
7.	"Heaven Only Knows"	Balance of Power, 1986	2:55
8.	"Starlight"	Out of the Blue	4:31
9.	"Four Little Diamonds"	Secret Messages, 1983	4:05
10.	"Secret Messages"	Secret Messages	4:43
11.	"Eldorado"	Eldorado	5:18
12.	"So Serious"	Balance of Power	2:42
13.	"Last Train to London"	Discovery, 1979	4:30
14.	"In My Own Time"	Zoom, 2001	3:03
15.	"Destination Unknown"	"Calling America" B-side, 1986	4:10
16.	"The Way Life's Meant to Be"	Time	4:39
17.	"One Summer Dream"	Face the Music, 1975	5:21
18.	"Calling America"	Balance of Power	3:28
19.	"Moment in Paradise"	Zoom	3:34
20.	"Surrender"	30th Anniversary Edition of A New World Record	2:33
Total length:			79:22

== Personnel ==
- Jeff Lynne – vocals, lead & rhythm guitars, keyboards, bass ("Heaven Only Knows", "Four Little Diamonds", "Secret Messages", "Eldorado", "So Serious", "In My Own Time", "Destination Unknown", "Calling America", "Moment in Paradise"), drums ("In My Own Time"), string arrangements
- Bev Bevan – drums, percussion, backing vocals (All tracks except "In My Own Time" and "Moment in Paradise")
- Richard Tandy – keyboards, guitar, string arrangements, backing vocals (All tracks except "In My Own Time" and "Moment in Paradise")
- Kelly Groucutt – bass, backing vocals (All tracks except "Can't Get It Out of My Head", "Heaven Only Knows", "Four Little Diamonds", "Secret Messages", "Eldorado", "So Serious", "In My Own Time", "Destination Unknown", "Calling America" and "Moment in Paradise")
- Mik Kaminski – violin ("Do Ya", "Can't Get It Out of My Head", "Latitude 88 North", "It's Over", "Starlight", "Eldorado", "Last Train to London", "One Summer Dream", "Surrender")
- Hugh McDowell – cello ("Do Ya", "Can't Get It Out of My Head", "Latitude 88 North", "It's Over", "Starlight", "Eldorado", "Last Train to London", "One Summer Dream", "Surrender")
- Melvyn Gale – cello ("Do Ya", "Latitude 88 North", "It's Over", "Starlight", "Last Train to London", "One Summer Dream", "Surrender")
- Louis Clark – string arrangements ("Do Ya", "Can't Get It Out of My Head", "Latitude 88 North", "It's Over", "Starlight", "Eldorado", "Last Train to London", "One Summer Dream", "Surrender"))
- Mike de Albuquerque – bass, backing vocals ("Can't Get It Out of My Head")
- Christian Schneider – saxophone ("Heaven Only Knows", "Destination Unknown")
- Dave Morgan – backing vocals ("Four Little Diamonds", "Secret Messages")
- Rosie Vela – spoken word, tap dancing, string arrangements ("In My Own Time")
- Marc Mann – string arrangements ("In My Own Time"), rhythm guitar ("Moment in Paradise")
- Ringo Starr – drums ("Moment in Paradise")
