= Strange Magic: The Best of Electric Light Orchestra =

Greatest hits album by Electric Light Orchestra
- Released: 11 April 1995
- Recorded: July 1970–January 1986
- Genre: Rock
- Length: 120:24
- Label: Epic Associated, Legacy
- Producer: Jeff Lynne, Roy Wood (track 1)

Electric Light Orchestra chronology
The Very Best of the Electric Light Orchestra (1994)	Strange Magic: The Best of Electric Light Orchestra (1995)	Light Years, The Very Best of Electric Light Orchestra (1997)

Professional ratings
Review scores
Source	Rating
AllMusic	4.5/5 stars
Encyclopedia of Popular Music	4/5 stars
MusicHound	3.5/5

Strange Magic: The Best of Electric Light Orchestra is a compilation album by Electric Light Orchestra (ELO), released in 1995 only in the US.

The compilation favours album versions rather than single versions; tracks such as "Rock 'n' Roll Is King", "Shine a Little Love" and "Boy Blue" are longer. The compilation is sequenced chronologically and is drawn from US singles, but missing 3 from Xanadu, with exception of the European hit "Rockaria!" on disc one.

== Track listing ==
All tracks written by Jeff Lynne, except disc 1, track 2, written by Chuck Berry (*2).

=== Disc one (1972–1976) ===
1. "10538 Overture" – 5:29
2. "Roll Over Beethoven" – 8:09
3. "Showdown" – 4:09
4. "Daybreaker" – 3:31
5. "Ma-Ma-Ma Belle" (Extended version) – 4:11
6. "Can't Get It Out of My Head" – 4:22
7. "Boy Blue" – 5:18
8. "Evil Woman" – 4:19
9. "Strange Magic" – 4:30
10. "Livin' Thing" – 3:33
11. "Do Ya" – 3:44
12. "Telephone Line" – 4:40
13. "Rockaria!" – 3:14

=== Disc two (1977–1986) ===
1. "Turn to Stone" – 3:47
2. "Sweet Talkin' Woman" – 3:48
3. "Mr. Blue Sky" – 5:03
4. "It's Over" – 4:08
5. "Shine a Little Love" – 4:42
6. "Don't Bring Me Down" – 4:02
7. "Confusion" – 3:41
8. "Last Train to London" – 4:30
9. "Hold on Tight" – 3:06
10. "Twilight" – 3:41
11. "Rain Is Falling" – 3:55
12. "Rock 'n' Roll Is King" – 3:17
13. "Four Little Diamonds" – 4:05
14. "Stranger" – 4:27
15. "Calling America" – 3:29
16. "So Serious" – 2:41

== Personnel ==
- Jeff Lynne – Vocals, guitars, bass, keyboards
- Bev Bevan – Drums, percussion
- Richard Tandy – Keyboards, guitar
- Kelly Groucutt – Bass, vocals (1975 onwards)
- Michael d'Albuquerque – Bass (1973 to 1974)
- Mik Kaminski – Violin
- Wilfred Gibson – Violin on "Roll Over Beethoven," "Showdown," "Daybreaker," and "Ma-Ma-Ma Belle"
- Mike Edwards – Cello (1973 to 1974)
- Melvyn Gale – Cello (1974 to 1977)
- Hugh McDowell – Cello (1974 to 1977)
- Colin Walker – Cello on "Roll Over Beethoven," "Showdown," "Daybreaker," and "Ma-Ma-Ma Belle"
- Marc Bolan – Guitar on "Ma-Ma-Ma Belle"
- Roy Wood – Vocals, guitars, cello, bass, wind instruments on "10538 Overture"
- Ira Robbins (Trouser Press) – Liner notes edited from Afterglow

== See also ==
- 1995 in music
