= Afterglow (Electric Light Orchestra album) =

Box set by Electric Light Orchestra
- Released: 15 June 1990
- Recorded: July 1970 – January 1986
- Genres: Progressive rock, pop rock
- Length: 208:57
- Label: Epic
- Producer: Jeff Lynne

Electric Light Orchestra chronology
Balance of Power (1986)	Afterglow (1990)	ELO's Greatest Hits Vol. 2 (1992)

Professional ratings
Review scores
Source	Rating
AllMusic	4/5 stars
MusicHound	3/5
The Rolling Stone Album Guide	2.5/5 stars

Afterglow is the third box set compilation by Electric Light Orchestra (ELO). It was released in 1990 with liner notes by music critic and editor Ira Robbins of Trouser Press. A different two-CD compilation with identical artwork was issued simultaneously under the title The Very Best of The Electric Light Orchestra.

== Overview: Afterglow ==
The box set mixes the usual hit singles with lesser known album tracks and non-album B-sides, and is most notable for including most of the Secret Messages (1983) tracks that were not released when the intended album was reduced from a double to a single LP as well as B-sides from Balance of Power (1986) singles.

The discs of the box set were labelled with letters "E", "L" and "O", each covering a different compilation set of albums:

- Disc "E" – The Electric Light Orchestra (1971; tracks 1–2), ELO 2 (1973; tracks 3–6), On the Third Day (1973; tracks 7–9) and Eldorado (1974; tracks 10–11) (with the exception of "One Summer Dream" from Face the Music (1975))
- Disc "L" – Face the Music (tracks 1, 3, 5–6), A New World Record (1976; tracks 2, 4, 7–10), Out of the Blue (1977; tracks 11–15) and Discovery (1979; tracks 16–17)
- Disc "O" – Time (1981; tracks 1–2, 6 & 9), Secret Messages (1983; tracks 10 & 18) and Balance of Power (1986; tracks 13 & 16) (with the exception of "Shine a Little Love" from Discovery)

The songs from soundtrack album Xanadu (1980) were not included.

The song "Destination Unknown", which was previously released as a B-side to "Calling America" single, was issued as promo only CD single. This statement is untrue. It was a 10 track sampler, not a CD single.

== Track listing: Afterglow ==
All tracks written by Jeff Lynne, except "Roll Over Beethoven" by Chuck Berry and Ludwig van Beethoven.

=== Disc E (Disc 1) ===
1. "10538 Overture" – 5:32
2. "Mr. Radio" – 5:04
3. "Kuiama" – 11:19
4. "In Old England Town (Boogie No. 2)" – 6:54
5. "Mama" – 7:03
6. "Roll Over Beethoven" – 8:08
7. "Bluebird Is Dead" – 4:24
8. "Ma-Ma-Ma Belle" – 3:52
9. "Showdown" – 4:07
10. "Can't Get It Out of My Head" – 4:25
11. "Boy Blue" – 5:20
12. "One Summer Dream" – 5:47

=== Disc L (Disc 2) ===
1. "Evil Woman" – 4:18
2. "Tightrope" – 5:03
3. "Strange Magic" – 4:29
4. "Do Ya" – 3:44
5. "Nightrider" – 4:22
6. "Waterfall" – 4:10
7. "Rockaria!" – 3:14
8. "Telephone Line" – 4:39
9. "So Fine" – 3:54
10. "Livin' Thing" – 3:31
11. "Mr. Blue Sky" (Japanese 7" edit) – 3:44
12. "Sweet Is the Night" – 3:27
13. "Turn to Stone" – 3:48
14. "Sweet Talkin' Woman" – 3:48
15. "Steppin' Out" – 4:38
16. "Midnight Blue" – 4:17
17. "Don't Bring Me Down" – 4:03

=== Disc O (Disc 3) ===
1. "Prologue" – 1:16
2. "Twilight" – 3:33
3. "Julie Don't Live Here" – 3:40
  - B-side to the "Twilight" single, 1981
4. "Shine a Little Love" – 4:39
5. "When Time Stood Still" – 3:33
  - B-side to the "Hold on Tight" single, 1981
6. "Rain Is Falling" – 3:57
7. "The Bouncer" – 3:13
  - B-side to the "Four Little Diamonds" single, 1983; Previously unreleased in the US
8. "Hello My Old Friend" – 7:51
  - Previously unreleased
9. "Hold on Tight" – 3:06
10. "Four Little Diamonds" – 4:08
  - features a slightly longer intro than the album version
11. "Mandalay" – 5:19
  - Previously unreleased
12. "Buildings Have Eyes" – 3:55
  - B-side to "Secret Messages" single; Previously unreleased in the US
13. "So Serious" – 2:39
14. "A Matter of Fact" – 3:58
  - B-side to "So Serious" single; Previously unreleased in the US
15. "No Way Out" – 3:23
  - Previously unreleased
16. "Getting to the Point" – 4:28
17. "Destination Unknown" – 4:05
  - B-side to "Calling America" 12 inch UK single; Previously unreleased in the US
18. "Rock 'n' Roll Is King" (Single edit) – 3:07

== Track listing: The Very Best Of The Electric Light Orchestra ==
All tracks written by Jeff Lynne, except "Roll Over Beethoven" by Chuck Berry.

=== Disc 1 ===
1. "Evil Woman" – 4:18
2. "Livin' Thing" – 3:31
3. "Turn to Stone" – 3:48
4. "Can't Get It Out of My Head" – 4:25
5. "Rockaria!" – 3:14
6. "Telephone Line" – 4:39
7. "Mr. Blue Sky" (Japanese 7" edit) – 3:44
8. "Sweet Talkin' Woman" – 3:48
9. "Confusion" – 3:42
10. "Rock 'n' Roll Is King" (Album version) – 3:43
11. "Strange Magic" – 4:05
12. "Calling America" – 4:05

=== Disc 2 ===
1. "Don't Bring Me Down" – 4:03
2. "So Serious" – 2:41
3. "Getting to the Point" – 4:28
4. "Do Ya" – 3:45
5. "Hold on Tight" – 3:06
6. "Secret Messages" (Album version) – 4:47
7. "Wild West Hero" – 4:40
8. "Here Is the News" – 3:49
9. "Shine a Little Love" – 4:40
10. "I'm Alive" – 3:45
11. "All Over the World" – 4:01
12. "Roll Over Beethoven" (Single edit) – 4:32

== Personnel ==
- Jeff Lynne – vocals, guitars
- Bev Bevan – drums, percussion
- Richard Tandy – keyboards, guitar
- Kelly Groucutt – bass, vocals (1974 onwards)
- Mike de Albuquerque – bass (to 1974)
- Bill Hunt – French horn, hunting horn (tracks 1 & 2 on Disc E)
- Mik Kaminski – violin
- Wilfred Gibson – violin (tracks 3, 4, 5, 6, 8 & 9 on Disc E)
- Steve Woolam – violin (tracks 1 & 2 on Disc E)
- Mike Edwards – cello (to 1974)
- Melvyn Gale – cello (1975 onwards)
- Hugh McDowell – cello
- Colin Walker – cello (tracks 3, 4, 5 & 6 on Disc E)
- Marc Bolan – guitar (on "Ma-Ma-Ma Belle")
- Roy Wood – vocals, guitars, cello, bass, wind instruments (tracks 1, 2 & 4 on Disc E)
- Ira Robbins (Trouser Press) – liner notes (1990)

== See also ==
- Flashback
