= The Very Best of the Electric Light Orchestra =

Greatest hits album by Electric Light Orchestra
- Released: 20 June 1994
- Recorded: 1973–1985
- Genre: Rock
- Label: Dino
- Producer: Jeff Lynne

Electric Light Orchestra chronology
ELO's Greatest Hits Vol. 2 (1992)	The Very Best of the Electric Light Orchestra (1994)	Strange Magic: The Best of Electric Light Orchestra (1995)

Professional ratings
Review scores
Source	Rating
Music Week	4/5 stars

The Very Best of the Electric Light Orchestra is a compilation album by the Electric Light Orchestra (ELO), released in 1994. It peaked at number four on the UK Albums Chart.

== Track listing ==
All tracks are written by Jeff Lynne, with the exception of Roll Over Beethoven by Chuck Berry.

No.	Title	Original Album	Length
1.	"Sweet Talkin' Woman"	Out of the Blue	3:48
2.	"Mr. Blue Sky"	Out of the Blue	5:02
3.	"Livin' Thing"	A New World Record	3:33
4.	"Evil Woman"	Face the Music	4:14
5.	"Telephone Line"	A New World Record	4:41
6.	"Rockaria!"	A New World Record	3:14
7.	"Turn to Stone"	Out of the Blue	3:49
8.	"Don't Bring Me Down"	Discovery	4:04
9.	"Wild West Hero"	Out of the Blue	4:41
10.	"All Over the World"	Xanadu	4:00
11.	"Hold on Tight"	Time	3:07
12.	"Confusion"	Discovery	3:41
13.	"Showdown"	On the Third Day	4:10
14.	"Last Train to London"	Discovery	4:33
15.	"Strange Magic"	Face the Music	4:09
16.	"Shine a Little Love"	Discovery	4:44
17.	"The Diary of Horace Wimp"	Discovery	4:17
18.	"Roll Over Beethoven (Live)"	ELO 2	4:20

== Charts ==
Chart (1994–1995)	Peak position
Australian Albums (ARIA)	15
Finnish Albums (The Official Finnish Charts)	5
Scottish Albums (OCC)	5
UK Albums (OCC)	4

== Certifications ==
Region	Certification	Certified units/sales
United Kingdom (BPI)	Gold	100,000^{*}
^{*} Sales figures based on certification alone.
