= Wembley or Bust =

Live album and concert film by Jeff Lynne's ELO
- Released: 17 November 2017
- Recorded: 24 June 2017
- Venue: Wembley Stadium
- Genre: Rock
- Length: 98:25 (album), 118:00 (DVD)
- Label: Big Trilby; Columbia
- Director: Paul Dugdale
- Producer: Jeff Lynne

Jeff Lynne's ELO chronology
Alone in the Universe (2015)	Wembley or Bust (2017)	From Out of Nowhere (2019)

Wembley or Bust is a live album and concert film by Jeff Lynne's ELO. It was recorded during the Alone in the Universe Tour at Wembley Stadium. The album peaked at number 8 on the UK Albums Chart and at number 12 on the Billboard Top Rock Albums. The album was also certified silver in the United Kingdom.

== Background and recording ==
Jeff Lynne decided to reform the Electric Light Orchestra after BBC DJ Chris Evans and the listeners of his show expressed their desire to see ELO play live again. Lynne recruited former ELO member Richard Tandy along with a new band and played a single concert in Hyde Park, London to a crowd of 50,000 in September 2014. After the success of the show, Lynne decided to produce another ELO album. The album Alone in the Universe was released in November 2015, and the band undertook the Alone in the Universe Tour to promote the record with a similar band from the Hyde Park Concert.

The album and film were both recorded during the Alone in the Universe Tour at Wembley Stadium, in London. The concert was performed in front of a sellout crowd of 60,000 on 24 June 2017. The experience from the concert would later be described in the song "Time of Our Life" from the next ELO album From Out of Nowhere.

== Release and promotion ==
Prior to the album and DVD's release, in addition to a trailer, 3 videos were taken from the film and were released on ELO's YouTube channel, the songs featured in the videos were: "Turn to Stone", "Telephone Line", and "Evil Woman".

Wembley or Bust was released via record labels Big Trilby, Columbia, and Sony Music. It was made available on CD, LP, and digital download.

In 2018 a book entitled Wembley or Bust was released, limited to only 1,500 copies. The book is about Lynne's music career and the planning that went into the Wembley or Bust concert. Included with the book was a 7" vinyl picture disc with the live recordings of "Xanadu" and "Don't Bring Me Down".

== Songs ==
All of the songs played at the concert were included on the album and film. Almost all of the songs were previous ELO songs, with the exception of the Traveling Wilburys' song "Handle with Care", a band of which Jeff Lynne was formerly a member.

== Critical reception ==
Professional ratings
Review scores
Source	Rating
AllMusic	3/5 stars
Record Collector	4/4 stars
The Spill Magazine	4/5 stars

The album received favorable reviews, with most of the discussion about how the complex sound of ELO was performed. The Decider said that "It sounds perfect. Pitch perfect. Every note. So perfect, it's just like listening to the record." Audiophile Review similarly said, "it sure is swell to hear these dense, complex arrangements performed live as Jeff intended them to be heard!" The Spill Magazine called it "A legendary performance from a world-class band". In his review, Stephen Thomas Erlewine at AllMusic said that Wembley or Bust "could sometimes be mistaken for an ELO greatest-hits album", but he also mentioned that Lynne "is a little rougher and lower than he was at his peak".

== Track listing ==
=== Audio CD ===
All tracks are written by Jeff Lynne, except where noted.

Disc 1
No.	Title	Writer(s)	Length
1.	"Standin' in the Rain"		4:11
2.	"Evil Woman"		4:36
3.	"All Over the World"		4:00
4.	"Showdown"		4:15
5.	"Livin' Thing"		4:09
6.	"Do Ya"		4:12
7.	"When I Was a Boy"		3:28
8.	"Handle with Care"	Traveling Wilburys	3:45
9.	"Last Train to London"		4:24
10.	"Xanadu"		3:23
11.	"Rockaria!"		3:20
12.	"Can't Get It Out of My Head"		4:45

Disc 2
No.	Title	Writer(s)	Length
1.	"10538 Overture"		4:48
2.	"Twilight" (includes "Prologue")		4:45
3.	"Ma-Ma-Ma Belle"		4:07
4.	"Shine a Little Love"		3:54
5.	"Wild West Hero"		4:09
6.	"Sweet Talkin' Woman"		3:44
7.	"Telephone Line"		4:55
8.	"Turn to Stone"		4:00
9.	"Don't Bring Me Down"		4:14
10.	"Mr. Blue Sky"		5:11
11.	"Roll Over Beethoven"	Chuck Berry	6:10
Total length:			1:38:25

=== Vinyl LP ===
Side A
No.	Title	Length
1.	"Standin' in the Rain"	4:11
2.	"Evil Woman"	4:36
3.	"All Over the World"	4:00
4.	"Showdown"	4:15

Side B
No.	Title	Writer(s)	Length
5.	"Livin' Thing"		4:09
6.	"Do Ya"		4:12
7.	"When I Was a Boy"		3:28
8.	"Handle with Care"	Traveling Wilburys	3:45

Side C
No.	Title	Length
1.	"Last Train to London"	4:24
2.	"Xanadu"	3:23
3.	"Rockaria!"	3:20
4.	"Can't Get It Out of My Head"	4:45

Side D
No.	Title	Length
5.	"10538 Overture"	4:48
6.	"Twilight" (includes "Prologue")	4:45
7.	"Ma-Ma-Ma Belle"	4:07
8.	"Shine a Little Love"	3:54

Side E
No.	Title	Length
1.	"Wild West Hero"	4:09
2.	"Sweet Talkin' Woman"	3:44
3.	"Telephone Line"	4:55
4.	"Turn to Stone"	4:00

Side F
No.	Title	Writer(s)	Length
5.	"Don't Bring Me Down"		4:14
6.	"Mr. Blue Sky"		5:11
7.	"Roll Over Beethoven"	Chuck Berry	6:10
Total length:			1:38:25

== Personnel ==
Personnel for the live album and film.

Most of the band had performed with Jeff Lynne on previous occasions at Children In Need rocks in 2013, Festival In a Day at Hyde Park and Glastonbury 2016 though the celloists Amy Langley, Jessica Cox and the violinist Rosie Langley (who replaced Chereene Allen on violin solos) had appeared at Glastonbury as part of the Orchestra. The keyboardist, Marcus Byrne, replaced Richard Tandy on piano and vocoder, causing his former role to be replaced by Jo Webb on keyboards, backing vocals and acoustic guitar (on "Handle with Care" (replacing Mick Wilson from Hyde Park)). The percussionist, Mick Wilson, was removed from the band before Glastonbury causing most of his role to be replaced by the backing vocalist Iain Hormal and Melanie Lewis-McDonald.

Jeff Lynne's ELO

- Jeff Lynne – lead vocals, acoustic and electric guitars, composer, lyricist, mixing engineer, producer
- Mike Stevens – backing vocals, acoustic and electric guitars, harmonica, musical director
- Marcus Byrne – piano, keyboards, vocoder
- Bernie Smith – synthesizer, keyboards
- Donavan Hepburn – drums
- Milton McDonald – backing vocals, acoustic and electric guitars
- Lee Pomeroy – backing vocals, bass guitar
- Jo Webb – backing vocals, keyboards, acoustic guitar
- Iain Hornal – lead and backing vocals, 12 string guitars, fire extinguisher
- Melanie Lewis-McDonald – lead and backing vocals
- Rosie Langley – violin
- Amy Langley – cello
- Jessica Cox – cello

Additional personnel

- Craig Fruin – manager
- Steve Jay – mixing engineer
- Adam Ayan – mastering engineer
- Carsten Windhorst – photography
- Gerard Hynes – photography
- Kris Goodman – photography
- Ryan Corey – art direction, design, illustration

== Charts ==
Chart (2017)	Peak position
Austrian Albums (Ö3 Austria)	20
Belgian Albums (Ultratop Flanders)	34
Belgian Albums (Ultratop Wallonia)	64
Canadian Albums (Billboard)	12
Dutch Albums (Album Top 100)	17
German Albums (Offizielle Top 100)	12
Scottish Albums (OCC)	8
Spanish Albums (PROMUSICAE)	58
Swedish Albums (Sverigetopplistan)	21
Swiss Albums (Schweizer Hitparade)	54
UK Albums (OCC)	9
US Billboard 200	90
US Top Album Sales (Billboard)	32
US Top Rock Albums (Billboard)	12
US Indie Store Album Sales (Billboard)	8

== Certifications ==
Region	Certification	Certified units/sales
United Kingdom (BPI)	Silver	60,000^{‡}
^{‡} Sales+streaming figures based on certification alone.
