= Strange Magic =

Strange Magic may refer to:

- Strange Magic (film), a 2015 animated fantasy film
- Strange Magic (song), a 1975 Electric Light Orchestra song, whose name the film was based on
- Strange Magic: The Best of Electric Light Orchestra, a 1995 greatest hits album
