= Beatles Forever =

Unreleased song by Electric Light Orchestra

Song by Electric Light Orchestra
- Released: Unreleased
- Recorded: 1982, Wisseloord Studios, Hilversum, the Netherlands
- Genre: Rock
- Length: 4:28
- Label: Jet Records
- Songwriter: Jeff Lynne
- Producer: Jeff Lynne

"Beatles Forever" is an unreleased song by Electric Light Orchestra in 1983, written by Jeff Lynne and intended for the album Secret Messages. Initially, it was to be the seventh track of the double album configuration, featured on side two of the LP. When the album was shortened to a single LP by CBS Records, eight of the eighteen total tracks were removed, including "Beatles Forever."

The other seven tracks have since had official releases on various albums and remasters in some form prior to the 2018 double album release. Though this reissue of the parent album was meant to follow the original 1983 intended configuration, "Beatles Forever" was again excluded, making it the only track from the original album not to appear later as an official bonus track or part of a compilation.

== Recording and composition ==
Recorded in February, 1982, "Beatles Forever" was one of the first songs recorded for Secret Messages. The band was in the middle of the Dutch portion of the Time Tour when they visited Wisseloord Studios to record a few new songs— something that Lynne would later refer to as a "flying visit." Along with the songs "Train of Gold", "No Way Out" and "Motor Factory" (early version of "Rock 'n' Roll Is King") that were all started during that same session, "Beatles Forever" is known as one of the four tracks bassist Kelly Groucutt performed on the album.

The track is a Beatles tribute song, with lyrics that express high admiration for the band and their songs. Throughout the chorus, various Beatles' song titles are sung and quoted, with some including their corresponding motifs played on either Lynne's guitar or Richard Tandy's synthesizers. The song is in C major and has a main tempo of roughly 77 beats-per-minute while the second half of the chorus has a faster 152 bpm. Along with drummer Bev Bevan's playing and common on the parent album, the drum machine Oberheim DMX is featured, providing additional percussion elements, though it is unclear whether Lynne or Tandy specifically contributed this. Lynne, Groucutt and touring musician Dave Morgan provided backing vocals on the pre-chorus and chorus; Morgan later recalled in an interview that he was mimicking the vocals of John Lennon. No orchestral strings are featured on the song. At the end of the track, the sounds of a cheering audience are heard as the chorus fades out.

Parts of the chorus and chord progression would later appear in the Jeff Lynne song "Video!" from the soundtrack to the film Electric Dreams in 1984.

== Legacy ==
As of 2026, "Beatles Forever" remains unreleased officially. Acetates of the original 1983 double LP configuration that include the song do exist and have appeared on eBay on several occasions. Bootlegs of the song have circulated online, with one of them being a low-quality recording of the song being played at an ELO fan convention in 2001. Despite its unreleased status, the song has been covered by others on YouTube. In mid-to-late 2020, the song was leaked in significantly higher quality twice, once in July and once in September with a fanmade music video. Both leaks claim to be a recording of the acetates.

Jeff Lynne has since labelled the song as one he is not fond of. In a 2001 interview with Rockline, he stated:

"It's 'cause it's so fawning, y'know. It's so over the top, y'know. Um... maybe one day it'll come out. I'd like to sort of redo it or something."

Although not released on any official medium, a small snippet of the song's intro can be heard on the final fade-out of the 2018 double LP version of "No Way Out" via print-through, if the volume is turned up.

== Personnel ==
- Jeff Lynne – vocals, guitar, Oberheim DMX
- Bev Bevan – drums, percussion
- Richard Tandy – synthesizer, harmonica, Oberheim DMX
- Kelly Groucutt – bass guitar, backing vocals
- Dave Morgan – backing vocals
