= Alone in the Universe =

Studio album by Jeff Lynne's ELO
- Released: 13 November 2015
- Recorded: 2014–2015
- Studio: Bungalow Palace
- Length: 40:29
- Label: Columbia
- Producer: Jeff Lynne

Electric Light Orchestra chronology
Electric Light Orchestra Live (2013)	Alone in the Universe (2015)	Wembley or Bust (2017)

Singles from Alone in the Universe
- 1. "When I Was a Boy" Released: 23 September 2015; 2. "When the Night Comes" Released: 15 October 2015; 3. "One Step at a Time" Released: 30 October 2015; 4. "Ain't It a Drag" Released: 1 April 2016

Alone in the Universe is the thirteenth studio album by British rock band Electric Light Orchestra (ELO), and the first credited to Jeff Lynne's ELO. The moniker came out from Lynne as a response to ELO tribute and imitation bands, who repeatedly used ELO for promoting their own tours. Released on 13 November 2015, the album is the first of new original material credited to the group since Zoom in 2001, and the second since the group's original disbandment in 1986. It is also the first album since the group's debut album to not feature keyboardist Richard Tandy.

The album was met with generally favourable reviews, peaking at number two on the Billboard Top Rock Albums and number four on the UK Albums Chart, where it has been certified Platinum. It was followed by the album From Out of Nowhere, which was released on 1 November 2019.

== Background and recording ==
ELO originally disbanded in 1986. In 2001, co-founder Jeff Lynne attempted to reform the band for a new tour to promote Zoom, the last studio album of original material credited to ELO, but the tour was cancelled due to low ticket sales. Lynne returned to freelance record producing. Years later, BBC DJ Chris Evans invited Lynne on the air and, with listener backing, urged him to tour again. The recording of his solo covers album, Long Wave (2012), was also inspirational for Lynne, and led him to experiment more with his songwriting based on the described "adventurous" qualities of the traditional pop standards he had chosen.

The group subsequently returned for a single performance at Hyde Park in September 2014 as Jeff Lynne's ELO. Of the original ELO members, Lynne was the only founding member present, accompanied by Richard Tandy, the band's veteran keyboardist. Lynne said he had not spoken to co-founder Bev Bevan in about 30 years, adding "Richard is my lifetime man in the group. ... He's a great musician, a great piano player and I really enjoy his company." Alone in the Universe would be recorded at Lynne's home studio, Bungalow Palace, over the course of 18 months. Lynne played nearly every instrument himself; the only other two people involved in the album's production were Laura Lynne, Jeff's daughter, who sings background vocals on "Love and Rain" and "One Step at a Time", and Steve Jay, the album's engineer, who plays the shaker and tambourine.

On 24 September 2015, Alone in the Universe was announced. When asked by a journalist what he had been doing since Zoom, the previous ELO album, Lynne jokingly responded: "I have no idea. I like a drink. I did lots of things. I just can’t think what it was."

== Songs ==
The album begins with its first single, "When I Was a Boy". The lyrics are about Lynne's childhood and teenage years in Birmingham, a part of his life he had visited through "Long Black Road" on Zoom. He said in an interview with Rolling Stone: "It's the most autobiographical song I've ever done. The words just wrote themselves, whereas normally I'd sweat them out and chain myself to my desk. It was about growing up and listening to my little crystal-set radio with headphones." "Love and Rain", which began as an old recording demo, is one of Lynne's favourite songs. In his own words, the main riff sounded like a giant Clavinet, but it was actually a Telecaster. His daughter Laura sings backing vocals on it.

The album's second single was "When the Night Comes". The song has a reggae rhythm, and it's one of the few songs on the album that features a string section. The track started life as a demo recorded on cassette, featuring a few basic chords, before it developed into the song featured on the album. "The Sun Will Shine on You" is a slow song that Lynne wrote for somebody he loved who was facing some big trouble, and at the same time to cheer himself up. As he said, the song made him feel better, a little less alone in the universe.

On "Ain't It a Drag", Lynne said "It began because I wanted a rocker for the album. You always need a rocker – at least I do. I was in the mood to do almost a Mersey Beat number and to me there's something about Ain't It a Drag that sounds a bit like Mersey Beat. All these years later, that whole Mersey Beat thing still works!" "I'm Leaving You" was a song Lynne wrote in tribute of his close friend and fellow Wilbury, Roy Orbison. He said: "I tried to write a Roy Orbison song like he would have written with his pal Joe Melson. That kind of style. Obviously not the singing. But the tune could've been a Roy Orbison song. It would have been a great one if he had sung it. But of course, I’m a bit late for that by about 28 years. He was a lovely guy anyway that I wanted to give him a nod on this album."

The last single released before the album saw the light was "One Step at a Time", which has a slightly more modern disco vibe. Lynne said: "I didn’t have quite enough up-tempo songs. It's got some very intricate chords in the verse, which I like a lot, because it's sort of old-fashioned music but with a regular rock and roll beat." Lynne also described the start of the title song, "Alone in the Universe": It was inspired by an article he read about the Voyager 1 probe leaving the Solar System, becoming the first man-made object to enter interstellar space. "It tickled me thinking about that. I mean, how lonely can you get? I sort of turned it into a missing-somebody type of deal like Voyager 1 was missing Voyager 2, so I turned it into people," he said.

== Release and promotion ==
The first single, "When I Was a Boy", was released digitally on 24 September 2015, and a music video for the single was soon released. "When the Night Comes" was released as the second single on 15 October 2015. "One Step at a Time" was released on 30 October 2015. These first three singles could be downloaded digitally when pre-ordering the album. "Ain't It a Drag" was released as a single on 1 April 2016 with an animated videoclip, nearly five months after the album's release.

Alone in the Universe was eventually released on 13 November 2015 via record label Columbia. The album was made available on CD, vinyl and digital download, on both regular and deluxe editions. The deluxe edition contains two extra tracks: "Fault Line" and "Blue". Japanese editions (both standard and deluxe) contain all tracks plus "On My Mind", exclusive to that country. The album reached number 4 in the UK Albums Chart, the best result since 1983's Secret Messages. Meanwhile, in the United States, it peaked at number 2 on Billboard's Top Rock Albums chart, then at number 23 on The Billboard 200 albums chart, best result since 1981's Time.

== Alone in the Universe Tour ==
Shortly before the album's release in November 2015, Jeff Lynne's ELO set out on a short promotional tour of the UK which included an intimate set at Porchester Hall, London, a full performance for BBC Radio 2 at the BBC Radio Theatre in London, and an appearance at the Royal Variety Performance.

In late November 2015, ELO played their first two full shows in the United States in 30 years: a sold-out show in New York City, followed by a performance at the Fonda Theatre in Los Angeles. The band also appeared on television on The Tonight Show Starring Jimmy Fallon, Jimmy Kimmel Live, and CBS This Morning. The performance on CBS was nominated for a Daytime Emmy Award.

On 5 April 2016, Jeff Lynne's ELO embarked on a full Alone in the Universe tour, appearing at arena venues in UK and Europe, including the O2 in London and the 3Arena in Dublin, with English rock band The Feeling in primary support. The band was also featured in the legendary Sunday teatime slot at the Glastonbury Festival 2016. In September 2016, the band performed three shows at the Hollywood Bowl Fireworks Finale with the Los Angeles Philharmonic Association and two shows at the Radio City Music Hall in New York City.

On 27 June 2016, it was announced that the band would play Wembley Stadium for one night only on 24 June 2017. The concert was recorded and filmed for release on CD and DVD under the title Wembley or Bust.

The Alone in the Universe tour continued in the US and Europe in 2018. In the summer of 2019, Jeff Lynne's ELO returned to touring the United States, this time as Jeff Lynne's ELO Live 2019.

== Reception ==
Professional ratings
Aggregate scores
Source	Rating
AnyDecentMusic?	6.8/10
Metacritic	75/100
Review scores
Source	Rating
AllMusic	3.5/5 stars
American Songwriter	3.5/5 stars
Classic Rock	9/10
The Independent	4/5 stars
Música Nueva	5/5 stars
Pitchfork	6.3/10
Rolling Stone	3.5/5 stars
Slant Magazine	2.5/5 stars

The album received generally favourable reviews, with Q declaring Alone in the Universe "warm-hearted, consummate, just about perfect". Most discourse surrounding the album discussed how it fits in with the rest of their discography, with Pitchfork calling it "a fine addition to their catalog" and "much better than these late-career albums tend to sound." The Guardian suggested in its four of five star review: "While he only once comes close to matching the pop perfection of his 70s imperial phase ... there's plenty to enjoy elsewhere. ... There is only one misstep – the clumsy, Whitesnake-worthy lyrics to 'Dirty to the Bone' are rooted a little too firmly in the 70s – but otherwise this is an excellent return." Trucking concluded a two of five star review by suggesting: "While not necessarily horrendous, AITU hardly recaptures ELO's glory days, sounding empty, under-produced, and more like a collection of 1970s B-sides."

== Track listings ==
All tracks are written by Jeff Lynne.

Standard edition
No.	Title	Length
1.	"When I Was a Boy"	3:12
2.	"Love and Rain"	3:29
3.	"Dirty to the Bone"	3:06
4.	"When the Night Comes"	3:22
5.	"The Sun Will Shine on You"	3:29
6.	"Ain't It a Drag"	2:34
7.	"All My Life"	2:50
8.	"I'm Leaving You"	3:07
9.	"One Step at a Time"	3:21
10.	"Alone in the Universe"	3:54

Japanese edition
No.	Title	Length
11.	"On My Mind"	3:09

Deluxe edition
No.	Title	Length
11.	"Fault Line"	2:07
12.	"Blue"	2:36

== Personnel ==
Per liner notes.

- Jeff Lynne – lead and backing vocals, guitar, bass, piano, drums, keyboards, vibraphones, production, mixing
- Steve Jay – shaker, tambourine, engineering, mixing
- Laura Lynne – backing vocals on "Love and Rain" and "One Step at a Time"

Additional personnel

- Craig Fruin – management
- Bob Ludwig – mastering
- Ryan Corey – design, illustration
- Rob Shanahan – photography

== Charts ==
=== Weekly charts ===
Chart (2015)	Peak position
Australian Albums (ARIA)	15
Austrian Albums (Ö3 Austria)	14
Belgian Albums (Ultratop Flanders)	8
Belgian Albums (Ultratop Wallonia)	24
Canadian Albums (Billboard)	34
Danish Albums (Hitlisten)	38
Dutch Albums (Album Top 100)	5
Finnish Albums (Suomen virallinen lista)	22
French Albums (SNEP)	127
German Albums (Offizielle Top 100)	7
Irish Albums (IRMA)	6
Italian Albums (FIMI)	70
New Zealand Albums (RMNZ)	24
Norwegian Albums (VG-lista)	9
Polish Albums (ZPAV)	23
Scottish Albums (Official Charts)	4
Spanish Albums (Promusicae)	26
Swedish Albums (Sverigetopplistan)	5
Swiss Albums (Schweizer Hitparade)	7
UK Albums (Official Charts)	4
UK Rock & Metal Albums (Official Charts)	1
US Billboard 200	23
US Top Album Sales (Billboard)	14
US Top Rock Albums (Billboard)	2
US Indie Store Album Sales (Billboard)	1

=== Year-end charts ===
Chart (2015)	Position
UK Albums (OCC)	18

Chart (2016)	Position
US Top Rock Albums (Billboard)	59

== Certifications ==
Region	Certification	Certified units/sales
United Kingdom (BPI)	Platinum	300,000^{‡}
^{‡} Sales+streaming figures based on certification alone.
