= From Out of Nowhere (Jeff Lynne's ELO album) =

Studio album by Jeff Lynne's ELO
- Released: 1 November 2019
- Studios: Bungalow Palace, Los Angeles
- Genres: Orchestral pop, rock and roll
- Length: 32:39
- Label: Columbia
- Producer: Jeff Lynne

Electric Light Orchestra chronology
Wembley or Bust (2017)	From Out of Nowhere (2019)

Singles from From Out of Nowhere
- 1. "From Out of Nowhere" Released: 26 September 2019; 2. "Time of Our Life" Released: 25 October 2019

From Out of Nowhere is the fourteenth studio album by British rock band Electric Light Orchestra (ELO), and the second credited to Jeff Lynne's ELO. The band's first studio album in four years, it was released on 1 November 2019 through Big Trilby and Columbia Records. The title track was released as the lead single on 26 September 2019. Lynne played most instruments on the album. Keyboardist Richard Tandy returned to play on one track, marking his final appearance on an ELO album prior to his death in 2024.

== Background ==
Lynne stated that the first track he wrote for the album was the title track, and said it was named "From Out of Nowhere" as "that's exactly where it came from". Its themes of "hope and salvation" along with optimism also appear throughout.

== From Out of Nowhere Tour ==
In January 2020, Jeff Lynne's ELO announced a tour that would have taken place across the UK, Europe, and Ireland. On 15 May, the tour was cancelled due to the COVID-19 pandemic.

== Critical reception ==
Professional ratings
Aggregate scores
Source	Rating
AnyDecentMusic?	6.4/10
Metacritic	70/100
Review scores
Source	Rating
AllMusic	3/5 stars
American Songwriter	3.5/5 stars
Classic Rock	4/5 stars
The Daily Telegraph	3/5 stars
Goldmine	4/5 stars
The Guardian	4/5 stars
The Arts Desk	2/5 stars
Consequence	F
The Irish Times	3/5 stars

From Out of Nowhere was met with generally favourable reviews upon its release. According to the review aggregator Metacritic, From Out of Nowhere received generally positive reviews based on a weighted average score of 70 out of 100 from 9 critic reviews. The review aggregator site AnyDecentMusic? compiled 7 reviews and gave it an average of 6.4 out of 10, based on their assessment of the critical consensus.

Classic Rock's Everett True rated it four stars, describing From Out of Nowhere as "comforting" and "a sparkling continuation of [Lynne] return to form". Michael Hann of The Guardian highlighted the "good-natured" nature and its alignment with classic ELO sounds while still missing the mark of their previous work. John M. Borack of Goldmine highlighted Lynne's melodic prowess and the album's enjoyable nature, noting that tracks such as "From Out of Nowhere," "Goin' Out on Me," and "All My Love" were particularly notable, but criticized Lynne's drum sound as a point of contention for some listeners.

In more mixed reviews, AllMusic rated the album three stars, stating that From Out of Nowhere's problem is that "The melodies don't easily lodge in the subconscious, but the bigger problem is that the production - by Lynne, who plays virtually every note on the record - is airless and precise." Uncut stated that Lynne is "at his best as the world's greatest Beatles tribute act." Lauren Murphy of The Irish Times wrote that while the album is "enjoyable and well-constructed" she suggested that it lacks innovation and risks sounding stagnant due to Lynne sticking to "ghosts of the past on several of these songs."

The Daily Telegraph's Neil McCormick praised the album for being "fundamentally sound" but heavily criticized its lack of innovation, stating: "In terms of chord progressions, melody, rhythm and even lyrical subject matter there is nothing on From Out of Nowhere that advances much further than about 1965. In terms of production, you could add another decade. From Out of Nowhere could be an ELO album from 40 years ago." The Arts Desk reviewer Nick Hasted criticized the album, emphasizing a lack of new ideas, a reliance on past formulas, and rehashing earlier ELO work rather than being a "forward-thinking" project.

== Track listing ==
All tracks are written by Jeff Lynne.

No.	Title	Length
1.	"From Out of Nowhere"	3:14
2.	"Help Yourself"	3:14
3.	"All My Love"	3:06
4.	"Down Came the Rain"	3:29
5.	"Losing You"	3:36
6.	"One More Time"	3:28
7.	"Sci-Fi Woman"	3:07
8.	"Goin' Out on Me"	3:09
9.	"Time of Our Life"	3:10
10.	"Songbird"	3:06
Total length:		32:39

== Personnel ==
Adapted from Stereogum, the official press release, and the album liner notes.

- Jeff Lynne – vocals, guitars, bass guitar, piano, drums, keyboards, cello on "Losing You", vibraphone, mixing
- Richard Tandy – piano solo on "One More Time"
- Steve Jay – engineering, mixing, tambourine, shakers

Additional personnel

- Bob Ludwig – mastering
- Ryan Corey – art direction, design, illustration
- Joseph Cultice – photography

== Charts ==
=== Weekly charts ===
Chart (2019)	Peak position
Australian Albums (ARIA)	12
Austrian Albums (Ö3 Austria)	10
Belgian Albums (Ultratop Flanders)	42
Belgian Albums (Ultratop Wallonia)	60
Canadian Albums (Billboard)	12
Danish Albums (Hitlisten)	37
Dutch Albums (Album Top 100)	29
Finnish Albums (Suomen virallinen lista)	31
French Albums (SNEP)	130
German Albums (Offizielle Top 100)	14
Irish Albums (IRMA)	13
Japanese Albums (Oricon)	34
Norwegian Albums (VG-lista)	26
Polish Albums (ZPAV)	16
Scottish Albums (Official Charts)	1
Spanish Albums (Promusicae)	8
Swedish Albums (Sverigetopplistan)	13
Swiss Albums (Schweizer Hitparade)	14
UK Albums (Official Charts)	1
US Billboard 200	47
US Top Album Sales (Billboard)	6
US Top Rock Albums (Billboard)	6
US Indie Store Album Sales (Billboard)	2
US Vinyl Albums (Billboard)	10

=== Year-end charts ===
Chart (2019)	Position
UK Albums (OCC)	92

== Certifications ==
Region	Certification	Certified units/sales
United Kingdom (BPI)	Silver	60,000^{‡}
^{‡} Sales+streaming figures based on certification alone.
