= Stranger (Electric Light Orchestra song) =

Single by Electric Light Orchestra

from the album Secret Messages
- B-side: "Train of Gold"
- Released: November 1983 (US)
- Recorded: 1983 Wisseloord Studios, Hilversum, the Netherlands
- Genre: Rock
- Length: 4:27 (album); 4:18 (USA single edit); 4:30 (double album version)
- Label: Jet
- Songwriter(s): Jeff Lynne
- Producer(s): Jeff Lynne

Electric Light Orchestra singles chronology
"Four Little Diamonds" (1983)	"Stranger" (1983)	"Calling America" (1986)

Secret Messages track listing
- 10 tracks Side one: 1. "Secret Messages"; 2. "Loser Gone Wild"; 3. "Bluebird"; 4. "Take Me On and On"; Side two: 5. "Four Little Diamonds"; 6. "Stranger"; 7. "Danger Ahead"; 8. "Letter from Spain"; 9. "Train of Gold"; 10. "Rock 'n' Roll Is King"

"Stranger" is a song written by Jeff Lynne and performed by the Electric Light Orchestra (ELO).

This song first appeared on the band's 10th studio album, Secret Messages. Stranger also was the third single from the LP.

The small quiet opening is one of the many messages that takes place in this album. A high pitched backmasked voice is heard during the opening, played in reverse the voice is actually saying "You're playing me backwards."

Cash Box called the song "a lovely McCartneyesque vocal and ballad about...a small town boy anxiously facing the rest of the world, finding his first girl, and resolving never to return."

"Recorded this in Holland, where I was looking through the eyes of a stranger." Jeff Lynne (2001 – Secret Messages Remaster)

== Chart positions ==
Chart (1983)	Peak Position
Polish Singles Chart	15
US Billboard Bubbling Under Hot 100 Singles	105
US Billboard Adult Contemporary	33
