= Don't Walk Away (Electric Light Orchestra song) =

Single by Electric Light Orchestra

from the album Xanadu
- B-side: "Across the Border"
- Released: November 1980
- Recorded: 1980
- Studio: Musicland Studios (Munich, Germany)
- Genre: Soft rock
- Length: 4:47
- Label: MCA; Jet
- Songwriter: Jeff Lynne
- Producer: Jeff Lynne

Electric Light Orchestra singles chronology
"All Over the World" (1980)	"Don't Walk Away" (1980)	"Hold On Tight" (1981)

Audio video
- "Don't Walk Away" on YouTube

"Don't Walk Away" is a song by the Electric Light Orchestra (ELO).

It was used in the 1980 feature film Xanadu in an animated sequence by Don Bluth and appears on the Xanadu soundtrack album. It was the last single released from the album.

The song was also used in the 2007 Broadway musical Xanadu.

The song is written in a standard key signature of C Major and was a number 21 hit in the UK.

== B side ==
=== Across the Border ===
"Across the Border" is a song written by Jeff Lynne and performed by Electric Light Orchestra.

It is track 4 on their highly successful 1977 album Out of the Blue. In 1980, the track became the B-side to the hit single "Don't Walk Away".

The song opens with a steam train and horn sound effect, then switching into a small bridge with the violin and the moog, then switching to an upbeat rock song, with the opening verse being reminiscent of The Beach Boys track "Heroes and Villains". Mik Kaminski plays violin and the song also has a Latin mariachi style brass section.

"Listen out for the train noises first, also some Spanish style trumpets. Big finish with much phasing on the drums". - Bev Bevan (1977 - Japanese Out of the Blue LP liner notes)

=== EP ===
In 1980, after the release of the UK box set Four Light Years, the song was intended to be the lead track on a proposed Across the Border EP which also included "Don't Bring Me Down", "Telephone Line" and "Mr. Blue Sky". For reasons unknown, the EP was withdrawn and the intended EP artwork which matched the parent box set was used as the slip cover for ELO's 1982 double A-side single "Here Is the News/Ticket to the Moon" instead. The EP version of the song first appeared on the 1997 compilation album, Light Years.

== Personnel ==
- Jeff Lynne – lead vocals, backing vocals, electric guitars, acoustic guitars, keyboards, synthesizers
- Bev Bevan – drums, percussion, tympani
- Richard Tandy – pianos, synthesizers, keyboards
- Kelly Groucutt – bass guitar, backing vocals

Additional personnel

- Strings by Louis Clark
- Mack – engineer

== Chart positions ==
Chart (1980)	Peak position
German Media Control Singles Chart	52
Irish Singles Chart	7
UK Singles Chart	21

== Cover versions ==
A successful foreign version was the Italian Mi mancherai ("I will miss you"), recorded in 1981 by Sicilian singer Marcella Bella as a theme for a popular TV show, on air on Sunday afternoons for Rete Uno (today's RaiUno). The Italian text was written by Giorgio Calabrese.
