= It's Over (Electric Light Orchestra song) =

Single by Electric Light Orchestra

from the album Out of the Blue
- B-side: "The Whale"
- Released: 4 October 1978 (US)
- Recorded: 1977
- Studio: Musicland, Munich, Germany
- Genre: Progressive pop
- Length: 4:08 (album version); 3:55 (US single edit); 3:34 (US promo single edit)
- Label: Jet
- Songwriter: Jeff Lynne
- Producer: Jeff Lynne

Electric Light Orchestra singles chronology
"Sweet Talkin' Woman" (1978)	"It's Over" (1978)	"The ELO EP" (1978)

Music video
- "It's Over" on YouTube

"It's Over" is a song recorded by the Electric Light Orchestra (ELO). It is the second track from the LP Out of the Blue. It was the last single to be lifted from the album and was released exclusively in the United States, becoming a minor hit. The orchestral beginning was actually the end of "Mr. Blue Sky" reversed.

In 2007, hip hop artist and producer will.i.am sampled parts of the song, and it formed the backbone of his opening track "Over" from the album Songs About Girls.

== Reception ==
Billboard said that "It's Over" has a "classical feel" as a result of the shifting moods generated by the song. Cash Box said that it begins "with simple chording which opens to a strumming beat" and that the "strings add panorama" and that "the vocals are characteristically crystalline and soaring." Record World called it "a classic ELO single keyed by Jeff Lynne's unique vocals and production techniques."

== Chart performance ==
Chart (1978)	Peak position
US Billboard Hot 100	75

== "The Whale" ==
"The Whale" is an instrumental by the Electric Light Orchestra.

The song is track 15 from their hugely successful 1977 double LP Out of the Blue. The song was the B-side of "It's Over" in 1978 and was remastered and reissued on their box set Flashback.

The song features the keyboard talents of Richard Tandy prominently, as well as the usual orchestration conducted by Louis Clark. Composer Jeff Lynne was moved to write the instrumental piece after watching a documentary on the killing of whales, similar to Jon Anderson (of Yes fame)'s penning of "Don't Kill the Whale" in 1978.

In the 1980s and early 1990s, a portion of the song was featured during the nightly sign-off on Toronto television station CFTO-TV.
