= Balance of Power (album) =

Studio album by Electric Light Orchestra
- Released: 3 March 1986
- Recorded: Late 1984 to early 1985, remixed mid-to-late 1985
- Studios: Compass Point Studios, Nassau, Bahamas; Hartmann Digital Untertrubach, Germany
- Genres: Soft rock, synth-pop
- Length: 34:18
- Labels: Epic, Jet, CBS
- Producer: Jeff Lynne

Electric Light Orchestra chronology
Secret Messages (1983)	Balance of Power (1986)	Afterglow (1990)

Singles from Balance of Power
- 1. "Calling America" Released: 24 January 1986; 2. "So Serious" Released: 18 April 1986; 3. "Getting to the Point" Released: 1 August 1986

Balance of Power is the eleventh studio album by the Electric Light Orchestra (ELO). It was released in 1986. It is the final album by the band to feature co-founder Bev Bevan on drums, as well as the last album to feature a significant contribution from keyboardist Richard Tandy.

== Recording ==
During sessions for the previous album Secret Messages, bass guitarist Kelly Groucutt departed and the group was pared down to a trio of Jeff Lynne (who doubled on bass as a result of Groucutt's absence), Richard Tandy and Bev Bevan. Recording for the album began in mid-1984, with a planned release for Spring 1985. The addition of several synthesizer tracks and mixing work by Reinhold Mack to the album caused its release to be pushed back to March 1986.

Bandleader Jeff Lynne took a one-man-band approach to the recording, doing the production, guitar work, synthesizers, and percussion on the album mostly by himself, though keyboardist Richard Tandy made some key musical contributions as well. Describing their recording process, Richard Tandy said that "the usual way was to have a stack of keyboards in the control room, and me and Jeff [Lynne] playing along to a drum track, and Bev [Bevan] adding his things later."

The track "Endless Lies" features Lynne doing a vocal delivery reminiscent of Roy Orbison. Lynne said in a 2013 interview: "I played Roy [Orbison] 'Endless Lies' in his house, and I went, 'This is me trying to copy you in the middle; have a listen'. He listened and he chuckled, and he went, 'That's actually pretty good'." The song was originally recorded for the double LP version of Secret Messages, but was removed from Secret Messages when that album was downscaled to a single album. It reappears on Balance of Power in a slightly reworked and more compact form.

== Release ==
Professional ratings
Review scores
Source	Rating
AllMusic	2/5 stars
Encyclopedia of Popular Music	2/5 stars
The Music Box	2.5/5 stars
MusicHound	woof!
The Rolling Stone Album Guide	2/5 stars

The album is originally issued on the Jet label in various countries however was corrected to epic shortly after. Europe's CD releases were on CDEPC26467 (Epic) in March 1986. The US (ZK40048) and Japan (32DP407) CD releases were on CBS Associated.

The single "Calling America" was a Top 40 hit. The video for "Calling America" was shot in Paris, and contains shots of the band playing in front of Centre Georges Pompidou. A video was also made for the single "So Serious."

A remastered version of the album was released in 2007 by Legacy Recordings. This reissue featured seven bonus tracks, including an alternate version of "Heaven Only Knows", B-sides "Caught in a Trap" and "Destination Unknown", and previously unreleased songs like "In for the Kill".

== Tour and aftermath ==
For the first time in four years, ELO played live concerts and TV appearances to promote the album in the UK and Europe. The touring lineup consisted primarily of Lynne on lead vocals and electric guitar, Bevan on drums, and Richard Tandy on keyboards. Also in the touring band were Louis Clark on keyboards, Mik Kaminski on violin and synthesizer, Dave Morgan on backing vocals, acoustic guitar, and vocoder, and Martin Smith on bass guitar. (Note: According to ELO historian Barry Delve, the Balance of Power tour featured "the same lineup as the Time tour, except with bassist Martin Smith replacing Kelly Groucutt". Describing the Time tour lineup, he said that in addition to the "four core members", the tour featured "Louis Clark on keyboards (covering the orchestral parts), Dave Morgan on guitar, vocals and occasional keyboards and Mik Kaminski returning on violin and keyboards.") For one UK show, George Harrison also performed in a guest appearance.

They played as the opening act for Rod Stewart a handful of times, including on their final show on 13 July 1986 in Stuttgart, Germany. This would be the band's last live concert for fifteen years.

Balance of Power was the last studio album by the Electric Light Orchestra before their initial disbanding. The band name was briefly resurrected in 2001, then changed to "Jeff Lynne's ELO" from 2014 onwards.

== Track listing ==
All songs written by Jeff Lynne.

Side One
No.	Title	Length
1.	"Heaven Only Knows"	2:52
2.	"So Serious"	2:38
3.	"Getting to the Point"	4:28
4.	"Secret Lives"	3:26
5.	"Is It Alright"	3:25

Side Two
No.	Title	Length
6.	"Sorrow About to Fall"	3:59
7.	"Without Someone"	3:48
8.	"Calling America"	3:26
9.	"Endless Lies"	2:55
10.	"Send It"	3:04
Total length:		34:18

2007 CD Bonus Tracks
No.	Title	Length
11.	"Opening" (intro for track 12)	0:24
12.	"Heaven Only Knows" (alternate version)	2:32
13.	"In for the Kill" (alternate lyrics to "Caught in a Trap")	3:13
14.	"Secret Lives" (alternate take)	3:24
15.	"Sorrow About to Fall" (alternate mix)	3:48
16.	"Caught in a Trap" (US B-Side to "Calling America" single)	3:44
17.	"Destination Unknown" (UK B-Side to "Calling America" and "So Serious" singles)	4:10

== Personnel ==
- Jeff Lynne – vocals, electric and acoustic guitars, Synclavier II computer synthesizer, bass guitar, keyboards, percussion, producer
- Bev Bevan – drums, percussion, drum programming
- Richard Tandy – keyboards, sequence programming

Additional personnel

- Christian Schneider – saxophone
- Bill Bottrell – engineer
- Mack – engineer

== Charts ==
Chart (1986)	Peak position
Australian Albums (Kent Music Report)	49
Austrian Albums (Ö3 Austria)	29
Canada Top Albums/CDs (RPM)	46
Dutch Albums (Album Top 100)	20
Finnish Albums (The Official Finnish Charts)	14
German Albums (Offizielle Top 100)	18
Japanese Albums (Oricon)	16
Norwegian Albums (VG-lista)	4
Swedish Albums (Sverigetopplistan)	3
Swiss Albums (Schweizer Hitparade)	10
UK Albums (Official Charts)	9
US Billboard 200	49

== Certifications ==
Region	Certification	Certified units/sales
United Kingdom (BPI)	Silver	60,000^{^}
^{^} Shipments figures based on certification alone.

== Bibliography ==
- Delve, Barry (2022). Electric Light Orchestra: every album, every song. On Track. Sonicbond Publishing. ISBN 978-1-78952-224-2. OCLC 1340403001.
