= I'm Alive (Electric Light Orchestra song) =

Single by Electric Light Orchestra

from the album Xanadu
- B-side: "Drum Dreams"
- Released: 16 May 1980
- Recorded: 1980
- Studio: Musicland, Munich, Germany
- Genre: Pop; Pop rock
- Length: 3:45
- Label: Jet (UK); MCA (US)
- Songwriter: Jeff Lynne
- Producer: Jeff Lynne

Electric Light Orchestra singles chronology
"Confusion" / "Last Train to London" (1980)	"I'm Alive" (1980)	"Xanadu" (1980)

Audio video
- "I'm Alive" on YouTube

"I'm Alive" is a song by the Electric Light Orchestra (ELO), released as a single in May 1980. It is featured in a sequence near the beginning of the feature film Xanadu. The song also appears on the soundtrack album Xanadu.

== Background ==
In the film the song is heard as the Muses emerge from a graffiti-like portrait; Olivia Newton-John, playing Kira (Terpsichore), emerges last. The film's version of the song contains a fairly lengthy instrumental introduction, a small segment of which is used for the album version.

The single's non-album B-side, "Drum Dreams", is also featured in the film at the beginning of the Xanadu nightclub grand opening scene and segues into the movie title song. "Drum Dreams" was also used as the B-side of some versions of the "All Over the World" single.

== Reception ==
Cash Box said that it has "adept movement from electronically treated vocals to Lynne's lead". Record World said that "keyboard magic abounds with a Beatlesque melody line & heavenly falsetto choruses".

== Personnel ==
- Jeff Lynne - lead and backing vocals, electric guitars, keyboards, synthesizers
- Bev Bevan - drums, percussion
- Richard Tandy - pianos, synthesizers, keyboards
- Kelly Groucutt - bass guitar, backing vocals
- Louis Clark - strings

== Chart performance ==
=== Weekly charts ===
Chart (1980)	Peak position
Australia Kent Music Report	27
Canadian RPM Top Singles	10
Canada RPM Adult Contemporary	15
Dutch GfK chart	38
French SNEP Singles Chart	9
German Media Control Singles Chart	16
Irish Singles Chart	10
Italy	24
New Zealand Singles Chart	32
Norwegian Singles Chart	3
South Africa (Springbok)	9
UK Singles Chart	20
US Billboard Hot 100	16
US Billboard Adult Contemporary	48
US Cash Box Top 100 Singles	14
US Record World Singles	14
US Radio & Records (R&R)	12

=== Year-end charts ===
Chart (1980)	Rank
Italy (FIMI)	84
US Opus	80

=== Certifications ===
Country	Certifications (sales thresholds)
US (RIAA)	Gold
