= Secret Messages =

Studio album by Electric Light Orchestra
- Released: 24 June 1983
- Recorded: December 1982 – February 1983
- Studios: Wisseloord, Hilversum, Netherlands
- Genres: Rock; pop rock; art rock; synth-pop
- Length: 42:47 (Original release); 71:30 (2018 double album)
- Labels: Jet; Columbia
- Producer: Jeff Lynne

Electric Light Orchestra chronology
Time (1981)	Secret Messages (1983)	Balance of Power (1986)

Singles from Secret Messages
- 1. "Rock 'n' Roll Is King" Released: June 1983; 2. "Secret Messages" Released: August 1983; 3. "Four Little Diamonds" Released: September 1983 (US); 4. "Stranger" Released: November 1983

Professional ratings
Review scores
Source	Rating
AllMusic	3/5 stars
Encyclopedia of Popular Music	2/5 stars
MusicHound	woof!
The Philadelphia Inquirer	4/5 stars
PopMatters	(favourable)
Q	2/5 stars
The Rolling Stone Album Guide	2/5 stars
Record Mirror	4/5 stars

Secret Messages is the tenth studio album by Electric Light Orchestra, released in 1983 on Jet Records. It was the last ELO album with bass guitarist Kelly Groucutt, conductor Louis Clark and a full orchestra, and the last ELO album to be released on the Jet label. It was also the final ELO studio album to become a worldwide top 40 hit upon release.

== Original concept ==
Secret Messages, as its title suggests, is littered with hidden messages in the form of backmasking, some obvious and others less so. This was Jeff Lynne's second tongue-in-cheek response to allegations of hidden Satanic messages in earlier Electric Light Orchestra LPs by Christian fundamentalists, which led to American congressional hearings in the early 1980s (a similar response had been made by Lynne on the Face the Music album, during the intro to the "Fire on High" track).

Louis Clark returned to conduct the strings once more and the violinist Mik Kaminski appeared on an ELO recording for the first time since Out of the Blue in 1977, playing a violin solo on the track "Rock 'n' Roll Is King". On completion of this album, Lynne dismissed bass guitarist Groucutt after Groucutt sued for alleged lost royalties and later received a settlement out of court.

== Artwork ==
The cover was designed by David Costa created by the photographer Hag and hand-tinted by Kim Harris. It was the original from which Hag created "The Future's a Bit Fishy. We've Got a Hand in It." The cover's foreground contains figures from various classical paintings. In the building on the right of the cover, the band is featured in the first-floor windows.

In Britain, the back cover of Secret Messages has the mock notice "Warning: Contains Secret Backward Messages". Word of the album's impending release in the United States caused enough of a furor to cause CBS Records to delete the cover blurb there.

The back cover of the record jacket (made to look like the back of a picture frame) also contains "Secret Messages" in the form of three aged and weathered stickers. One is the track listing and the other two contain mock names of the retailer and manufacturer of the frame. These names are anagrams of the four band members: T.D. Ryan (R. Tandy), F.Y.J. Fennel (Jeff Lynne), G.U. Ruttock (K. Groucutt) and E.V. Nabbe (Bev Bevan). The inner record sleeve also contains a "Secret Message". The front and back has a string of dots and dashes that is actually Morse code and repeats "E L O": E (one dot), L (dot dash dot dot) and O (dash dash dash).

== Release ==
The record was originally going to be a double album, but this plan was thwarted by Jet's distributor, CBS Records, who claimed that producing a double vinyl album would be too expensive; as a result, leader Jeff Lynne would have to reduce it to a single album.

Three singles were released from the album in the UK: "Rock 'n' Roll Is King", the title track and "Four Little Diamonds". In the US, "Rock 'n' Roll Is King", "Four Little Diamonds" and "Stranger" were issued. "Rock 'n' Roll Is King" became the band's last UK Top 20 hit.

The songs "After All" and "Buildings Have Eyes" from the original intended double album were released as B-sides to "Rock 'n' Roll Is King" and "Secret Messages" respectively. The song "Endless Lies" was later re-recorded with a different pre-chorus for the band’s subsequently released Balance of Power album. Three additional songs, "Hello My Old Friend", a string-laden eight-minute long tribute to the band's home town Birmingham, "Mandalay" and "No Way Out" (along with aforementioned "Buildings Have Eyes") appeared on the Afterglow box set released in 1990.

The song "Letter from Spain" was used as backing music in commercials for the Games of the XXV Olympiad, held in 1992 in Barcelona.

In 2001, Secret Messages was remastered and reissued on CD with bonus tracks including the previously unreleased original 1983 version of "Endless Lies".

A 35th anniversary edition was released by Legacy Recordings on double LP and via streaming services on 3 August 2018. It closely matched the format and length originally conceived by Jeff Lynne for the 1983 release, though one track remains unreleased ("Beatles Forever"). Other alterations from the original 1983 release include the album's outro being moved from the end of "Rock 'n' Roll Is King" to "Hello My Old Friend" and an edit of "Rock 'n' Roll Is King" B-side "After All". However, the outro was cut on the vinyl edition. Released later in 2019 was a Japan exclusive CD version of the 35th anniversary edition which unlike the vinyl version, had the outro intact.Updated liner notes read:

"Secret Messages" was the first and last time I ever used a digital multi-track tape recorder. We tried out a different place to record. It was Wisseloord Studios in Hilversum, Holland. The sound of the room was just how I liked it. I enjoyed recording there so much, I wrote enough tunes for a double album! Anyway, this will be the first time "Secret Messages" has escaped intact. Thanks to all you great fans who've been asking to hear the original double album for a very long time.

— Jeff Lynne

== Track listing ==
All songs written by Jeff Lynne.

=== Original LP track listing ===
Side One
No.	Title	Length
1.	"Secret Messages"	4:44
2.	"Loser Gone Wild"	5:27
3.	"Bluebird"	4:13
4.	"Take Me On and On"	4:57
Total length:		19:23

Side Two
No.	Title	Length
1.	"Four Little Diamonds"	4:05
2.	"Stranger"	4:27
3.	"Danger Ahead"	3:52
4.	"Letter from Spain"	2:51
5.	"Train of Gold"	4:20
6.	"Rock 'n' Roll Is King"	3:49
Total length:		23:24

=== CD track listing ===
Original CD Track Listing
No.	Title	Length
1.	"Secret Messages"	4:44
2.	"Loser Gone Wild"	5:27
3.	"Bluebird"	4:13
4.	"Take Me On and On"	4:57
5.	"Time After Time" (A)	4:01
6.	"Four Little Diamonds"	4:05
7.	"Stranger"	4:27
8.	"Danger Ahead"	3:52
9.	"Letter From Spain"	2:51
10.	"Train of Gold"	4:20
11.	"Rock 'n' Roll Is King"	3:49
Total length:		46:56

Bonus tracks on the 2001 edition
No.	Title	Length
12.	"No Way Out"	3:28
13.	"Endless Lies"	3:26
14.	"After All"	2:23
Total length:		56:13

- A "Time After Time" was originally included on cassette tape format and on CD. Available on the vinyl format on the "Rock 'n' Roll Is King" maxi single and the Japan Digital Master of the album.

=== 2018 double album track listing ===
Side One
No.	Title	Length
1.	"Secret Messages"	4:43
2.	"Loser Gone Wild"	5:27
3.	"Bluebird"	4:13
4.	"Take Me On and On"	4:59
Total length:		19:22

Side Two
No.	Title	Length
1.	"Stranger"	4:27
2.	"No Way Out"	3:23
3.	"Letter From Spain"	2:51
4.	"Danger Ahead"	3:52
Total length:		14:33

Side Three
No.	Title	Length
1.	"Four Little Diamonds"	4:05
2.	"Train of Gold"	4:20
3.	"Endless Lies"	3:24
4.	"Buildings Have Eyes"	4:04
5.	"Rock 'n' Roll Is King"	3:10
Total length:		19:03

Side Four
No.	Title	Length
1.	"Mandalay"	5:20
2.	"Time After Time"	4:01
3.	"After All"	0:41
4.	"Hello My Old Friend" (on the LP edition the duration of the track is listed as 7:50)	8:30
Total length:		18:32

Additional planned track on side two of the original double album
No.	Title	Length
3.	"Beatles Forever"	4:30

== Personnel ==
=== ELO ===
- Jeff Lynne – Lead and backing vocals, guitars, synthesisers, bass guitar, piano, percussion, Oberheim DMX, producer
- Bev Bevan – Drums, percussion
- Richard Tandy – Synthesizers, grand piano, electric piano, harmonica, Oberheim DMX
- Kelly Groucutt – Bass guitar, backing vocals ("Train of Gold", "Rock 'n' Roll Is King", "No Way Out" and "Beatles Forever")

=== Additional personnel ===
- Mik Kaminski – electric violin ("Rock 'n' Roll Is King")
- Dave Morgan – additional backing vocals
- Bill Bottrell – Engineer
- Strings conducted by Louis Clark ("Train Of Gold", "Danger Ahead", "Stranger", "Buildings Have Eyes", "Time After Time" and "Hello My Old Friend")
- Al Quaglieri – Reissue producer (2001)

== Charts ==
=== Weekly charts ===
Chart (1983)	Peak position
Australian Albums (Kent Music Report)	19
Austrian Albums (Ö3 Austria)	11
Canada Top Albums/CDs (RPM)	20
Dutch Albums (Album Top 100)	7
Finnish Albums (The Official Finnish Charts)	12
German Albums (Offizielle Top 100)	6
Japanese Albums (Oricon)	35
New Zealand Albums (RMNZ)	13
Norwegian Albums (VG-lista)	5
Spanish Albums (AFYVE)	13
Swedish Albums (Sverigetopplistan)	11
UK Albums (Official Charts)	4
US Billboard 200	36
US CashBox Top 100 Albums	33

Chart (2018)	Peak position
Scottish Albums (Official Charts)	68

=== Year-end charts ===
Chart (1983)	Peak position
German Albums (Offizielle Top 100)	60

== Certifications ==
Region	Certification	Certified units/sales
Canada (Music Canada)	Gold	50,000^{^}
United Kingdom (BPI)	Gold	100,000^{^}
^{^} Shipments figures based on certification alone.
