= Four Little Diamonds =

1983 single by Electric Light Orchestra

Single by Electric Light Orchestra

from the album Secret Messages
- B-side: "Letter from Spain"; "The Bouncer" (12-inch only) (UK)
- Released: September 1983 (US); 4 November 1983 (UK)
- Recorded: 1983
- Studio: Wisseloord Studios (Hilversum, Netherlands)
- Genre: Pop rock
- Length: 4:05 (album version); 3:57 (single version); 4:12 (double album version)
- Label: Jet
- Songwriter: Jeff Lynne
- Producer: Jeff Lynne

Electric Light Orchestra singles chronology
"Secret Messages" (1983)	"Four Little Diamonds" (1983)	"Stranger" (1983)

Secret Messages track listing
- 10 tracks Side one: 1. "Secret Messages"; 2. "Loser Gone Wild"; 3. "Bluebird"; 4. "Take Me On and On"; Side two: 5. "Four Little Diamonds"; 6. "Stranger"; 7. "Danger Ahead"; 8. "Letter from Spain"; 9. "Train of Gold"; 10. "Rock 'n' Roll Is King"

"Four Little Diamonds" is a song by the British rock music group Electric Light Orchestra (ELO) from their 1983 album Secret Messages. It was also featured on their compilation albums Afterglow (with a slightly longer intro) and Flashback. The single did not do very well in the US, spending only two weeks on the Billboard Hot 100 chart and peaking at number 86. It also charted low in the UK, peaking at number 84.

The song refers to the search made by the singer for his cheating lover who also emotionally conned him because of a ring which had 'four little diamonds' set into it.

There was also a UK 12-inch Jet 3-track version with "The Bouncer" on the B-side. A UK 7-inch picture disc was also released featuring a competition to win 1 of 25 copies of the album re-cut from the master.

== Track listing ==
All songs written by Jeff Lynne.

7"

1. "Four Little Diamonds" – 3:57
2. "Letter from Spain" – 2:51

UK 12"

1. "Four Little Diamonds" – 3:57
2. "Letter from Spain" – 2:51
3. "The Bouncer" – 3:13

== Chart positions ==
Chart (1983)	Peak position
UK Singles Chart	84
US Billboard Hot 100	86

== In the Media ==
- The song is featured in video game Grand Theft Auto: Vice City on the in-game radio station "Flash FM"
