= Secret Messages (song) =

Single by Electric Light Orchestra

from the album Secret Messages
- B-side: "Buildings Have Eyes"
- Released: 26 August 1983
- Recorded: 1983 at Wisseloord Studios, Hilversum, the Netherlands
- Length: 4:44 (Album version); 3:35 (Single edit); 4:51 (Double album version)
- Label: Jet
- Songwriter: Jeff Lynne
- Producer: Jeff Lynne

Electric Light Orchestra singles chronology
"Rock 'n' Roll Is King" (1983)	"Secret Messages" (1983)	"Four Little Diamonds" (1983)

Secret Messages track listing
- 10 tracks Side one: 1. "Secret Messages"; 2. "Loser Gone Wild"; 3. "Bluebird"; 4. "Take Me On and On"; Side two: 5. "Four Little Diamonds"; 6. "Stranger"; 7. "Danger Ahead"; 8. "Letter from Spain"; 9. "Train of Gold"; 10. "Rock 'n' Roll Is King"

Music video
- "Secret Messages" on YouTube

"Secret Messages" is a song recorded by Electric Light Orchestra (ELO) and is the title track (and opening track) of the 1983 album Secret Messages. Parts of the music video featuring a radio telescope were filmed at Jodrell Bank in Cheshire, England.

== Composition ==
The song begins with strange effects and a backmasked voice (saying "welcome to the show") followed by a burst of morse code, before the song proper begins with a staccato keyboard part followed by drums and drum machines and guitar. The song and album were recorded in response to the backmasking controversy at the time, in which certain groups were claiming that rock artists were including hidden subliminal messages on their songs and albums.

== Reception ==
Music journalist John Van Der Kiste described the song as "Buggles-like pop." Writer Barry Delve said that the "soft, laid-back vocal contrasts effectively with the brisk performance to create a suitably enigmatic opener [to the album]."

== Commercial performance ==
The single peaked at 48 in the UK Singles Chart and at number 14 in the Irish Singles Chart.

== Chart history ==
Chart (1983)	Peak position
Irish Singles Chart	14
Polish Singles Chart	5
UK Singles Chart	48
