= Wild West Hero =

Single by Electric Light Orchestra

from the album Out of the Blue
- B-side: "Eldorado"
- Released: 26 May 1978
- Recorded: 1977
- Studio: Musicland Studios, Munich, Germany
- Genre: Art rock
- Length: 4:41
- Label: Jet
- Songwriter: Jeff Lynne
- Producer: Jeff Lynne

Electric Light Orchestra singles chronology
"Sweet Talkin' Woman" (1978)	"Wild West Hero" (1978)	"It's Over" (1978)

"Wild West Hero" is a song by Electric Light Orchestra (ELO), and the closing track and third single from the album Out of the Blue. The song was written reputedly by lead singer Jeff Lynne in four minutes while on holiday. Melvyn Gale, normally the band's cellist, provided the Western-style piano for this track.

It entered the UK Top 40 at No. 31 in June 1978 but fell to number 36 the following week. Thanks to a rush-release in 12" format on yellow vinyl, its fortunes were reversed a week later, and within six weeks it had risen to a peak position of number 6. Coincidentally this was also the highest UK position achieved by the group's previous single, "Mr. Blue Sky", and the next two, "Sweet Talkin' Woman" and "Shine a Little Love".

The chorus of the song has the same chord progression as Pachelbel's Canon's but transposed from D to G, which is the tonality of "Wild West Hero". The only exception is the 7th chord of the chorus, which is A instead of C.

== Chart history ==
Chart (1978)	Peak position
Irish Singles Chart	9
UK Singles Chart	6
