= Rock 'n' Roll Is King =

Single by Electric Light Orchestra

from the album Secret Messages
- B-side: "After All"; "Time After Time" (12" version)
- Released: June 1983
- Recorded: 1983 Wisseloord Studios, Hilversum, the Netherlands
- Genre: Rock and roll; roots rock
- Length: 3:49 (album version); 3:07 (single version); 3:10 (double-album version); 4:13 (remix); 4:58 (extended mix)
- Label: Jet
- Songwriter: Jeff Lynne
- Producer: Jeff Lynne

Electric Light Orchestra singles chronology
"The Way Life's Meant to Be" (1982)	"Rock 'n' Roll Is King" (1983)	"Secret Messages" (1983)

Secret Messages track listing
- 10 tracks Side one: 1. "Secret Messages"; 2. "Loser Gone Wild"; 3. "Bluebird"; 4. "Take Me On and On"; Side two: 5. "Four Little Diamonds"; 6. "Stranger"; 7. "Danger Ahead"; 8. "Letter from Spain"; 9. "Train of Gold"; 10. "Rock 'n' Roll Is King"

Music video
- "Rock 'n' Roll Is King" on YouTube

"Rock 'n' Roll Is King" is a song written and performed by Electric Light Orchestra (ELO) released as a single from the 1983 album Secret Messages. With this song the band returned to their rock roots. It features a violin solo by Mik Kaminski.

== Background ==
The song went through many changes during recording and at one point was going to be called "Motor Factory" with a completely different set of lyrics.

In an interview in the King of the Universe fanzine, Dave Morgan, who was with ELO at the time, described his involvement with the recording as such:

I sang on quite a few tracks, I sang on 'Rock 'N' Roll Is King'. I played on that one, but it wasn't called that, it was something about something about working at Austin Longbridge! It was full of car plant sounds, you could hear it going clank, clank, clank, like somebody hitting a lathe with a hammer, and Jeff went away and made it into 'Rock 'n' Roll Is King', wiped off everything we'd done, no, there was still some backing left in there, It was much better how he finished it off than it was before.

== Commercial performance ==
The single proved to be ELO's last UK top twenty hit single, and reached No. 19 in the US in August 1983.

== Chart history ==
=== Weekly charts ===
Chart (1983)	Peak position
Australia (Kent Music Report)	13
Austria (Ö3 Austria Top 40)	16
Belgium (Ultratop 50 Flanders)	4
Canada Top Singles (RPM)	6
Netherlands (Dutch Top 40)	4
Netherlands (Single Top 100)	8
Ireland (IRMA)	4
New Zealand (Recorded Music NZ)	17
Norway (VG-lista)	6
South Africa (Springbok Radio)	7
Spain (AFYVE)	30
Sweden (Sverigetopplistan)	20
Switzerland (Schweizer Hitparade)	8
UK Singles (Official Charts)	13
US Billboard Adult Contemporary	36
US Billboard Hot 100	19
US Billboard Top Tracks	19
US Cash Box	22
West Germany (GfK)	17

Chart (2021)	Peak position
Poland Airplay (ZPAV)	74

=== Year-end charts ===
Chart (1983)	Rank
Australia (Kent Music Report)	92
Belgium (Ultratop 50 Flanders)	36
Canada Top Singles (RPM)	57
Netherlands (Dutch Top 40)	74
US (Joel Whitburn's Pop Annual)	123
