= Calling America =

1986 single by Electric Light Orchestra

Single by Electric Light Orchestra

from the album Balance of Power
- B-side: "Caught in a Trap"; "Destination Unknown" (UK 12-inch only)
- Released: 24 January 1986 (US); 21 February 1986 (UK)
- Recorded: 1985
- Studio: Compass Point, Nassau, Bahamas; Hartmann Digital, Untertrubach, Germany
- Genre: Pop rock
- Length: 3:28
- Label: CBS Associated (US); Epic (UK)
- Songwriter: Jeff Lynne
- Producer: Jeff Lynne

Electric Light Orchestra singles chronology
"Stranger" (1983)	"Calling America" (1986)	"So Serious" (1986)

Music video
- "Calling America" on YouTube

"Calling America" is a song by the rock music group Electric Light Orchestra (ELO) released as a single from their 1986 album Balance of Power. The single reached number 28 in the United Kingdom, making it their 26th and final Top 40 hit single in their native country and peaked at number 18 on the Billboard singles chart, making it their 20th and final Top 40 hit single in the United States.

== Overview ==
Like most of the songs on Balance of Power, "Calling America" is musically upbeat and bright. Lyrically, the song can be considered an update to ELO's 1976 single "Telephone Line". In both songs, the narrator is attempting to contact a lover by telephone, although "Calling America" also discusses satellite communication. Appropriately, the song pays homage to the track "Telstar", which had celebrated the communication satellite of the same name, in the instrumental break. In his column Real Life Rock (published in The Village Voice), Greil Marcus called the song an "answer record to [the] 24-year old hit". Fellow American music journalist Chuck Eddy said, "Greil Marcus was the only person besides me who realized that 'Calling America' by ELO was one of the most brilliant records of last year. I thought it was really neat that it ended up on both our top 10s."

Epic Records released a three-track 12-inch single in the UK, with "Destination Unknown" as the B-side.

== Reception ==
Cashbox called it a "bright, cleanly done bit of pop sheen from the masters of the genre" with a "very hooky lyric." Billboard said that it has ELO's "familiar wall of sound and sci-fi predilections."

== Track listing ==
All songs written by Jeff Lynne.

7-inch single

1. "Calling America" – 3:28
2. "Caught in a Trap" – 3:43

US 12-inch single

1. "Calling America" – 3:28
2. "Caught in a Trap" – 3:43
3. "Endless Lies" – 2:54

UK 12-inch single

1. "Calling America" – 3:28
2. "Caught in a Trap" – 3:43
3. "Destination Unknown" – 4:10

== Chart history ==
Chart (1986–1987)	Peak position
Australian Kent Music Report Singles Chart	47
Austrian Ö3 Austria Top 40	22
Canada RPM Top Singles	28
French SNEP Singles Chart	10
German Media Control Singles Chart	31
Irish Singles Chart	16
South Africa (Springbok)	23
UK Singles Chart	28
US Billboard Hot 100	18
US Billboard Mainstream Rock Tracks	22
US Billboard Adult Contemporary	20
US Cashbox Top 100 Singles	26
US Radio & Records (R&R)	20

== Video ==
The video, directed by John Beug and Jane Simpson, was shot in Paris and contains shots of Centre Pompidou; the band plays in front of Pompidou.
