= All Over the World (Electric Light Orchestra song) =

1980 single by Electric Light Orchestra

Single by Electric Light Orchestra

from the album Xanadu
- B-side: "Drum Dreams" (US); "Midnight Blue" (UK)
- Released: July 1980
- Recorded: 1980
- Studio: Musicland Studios (Munich, Germany)
- Length: 4:02
- Label: Jet (UK); MCA (US)
- Songwriter: Jeff Lynne
- Producer: Jeff Lynne

Electric Light Orchestra singles chronology
"Xanadu" (1980)	"All Over the World" (1980)	"Don't Walk Away" (1980)

Audio video
- "All Over the World" on YouTube

"All Over the World" is a song by the Electric Light Orchestra (ELO). It is featured in the 1980 feature film Xanadu in a sequence with the film's stars Olivia Newton-John, Gene Kelly, and Michael Beck. The song also appears on the soundtrack album Xanadu.

== Background ==
One section of the lyrics lists a number of famous cities; London, Hamburg, Paris, Rome, Rio de Janeiro, Hong Kong, Tokyo, Los Angeles, New York City, Amsterdam and Monte Carlo. The last place named in the list is Shard End, the suburb of Birmingham, England where Jeff Lynne was born.

The sequence in the Xanadu film was filmed on location at the Beverly Hills Fiorucci store.

== Release and reception ==
Released after the single "Xanadu" (a collaboration with Olivia Newton-John), this was the third Top 20 ELO single released from the 1980 soundtrack, peaking at number 13 on the US Billboard Hot 100.

Cash Box called it "souped up '50s and '60s pop at its best", and praised the hook. Billboard called it one of ELO's "catchier tunes". Record World said that "a spirited chorus, triumphant keyboards & multitudinous handclaps carry the joyous, uplifting message".

The song was performed in the 2007 Broadway musical Xanadu.

This song featured prominently in the trailer for the Simon Pegg science fiction comedy film Paul and also played at the end of the film before the credits.

In 2022, Lynne listed it as one of his nine favorite ELO songs.

== Personnel ==
Credits adapted from the album Xanadu:

- Jeff Lynne – lead vocals, backing vocals, electric guitars, acoustic guitars, synthesizers
- Bev Bevan – drums, percussion, tympani
- Richard Tandy – pianos, synthesizers, keyboards
- Kelly Groucutt – bass guitar, backing vocals
- Louis Clark – strings

== Chart performance ==
=== Weekly charts ===
Chart (1980)	Peak position
Australia (Kent Music Report)	78
Belgium (Ultratop 50 Flanders)	25
Canada Top Singles (RPM)	16
Germany (GfK)	27
Ireland (IRMA)	12
Netherlands (Dutch Top 40)	11
Netherlands (Single Top 100)	10
UK Singles (Official Charts)	11
US Billboard Hot 100	13
US Billboard Adult Contemporary	46
US Cash Box	14
US Record World	8

=== Year-end charts ===
Chart (1980)	Rank
US Cash Box	100

== Certifications ==
Region	Certification	Certified units/sales
United Kingdom (BPI)	Silver	200,000^{‡}
^{‡} Sales+streaming figures based on certification alone.
