= Ghost band =

Legacy band that performs under the name of a deceased leader

A ghost band is a legacy band that performs under the name of a deceased leader. In rock and roll, it is a band that performs under the name of its founders, who are either deceased or have left the band. Use of the phrase may refer to a repertory jazz music ensemble, such as a Dixieland band, with a longstanding, historic name. But in the strictest sense, a ghost band is connected in some way to a deceased leader.

== Origin of the phrase ==
Gene Lees, Woody Herman's biographer, and several other sources attribute the coining of the phrase to Woody Herman, who used it to refer to successors of dance bands from the 1930s, 1940s, and 1950s.

The Vanguard Jazz Orchestra is a ghost band with a twist: the name is new, but the band is closely identified as being the legacy of The Thad Jones/Mel Lewis Orchestra, and like the Mingus Band, is producing new works. Thad Jones, who had once been a trumpeter with the Count Basie Orchestra, led Count Basie's ghost band with critical acclaim.

== Authorization ==
Ghost bands fall into three categories: (i) authorized, (ii) unauthorized, and (iii) unspecified. Authorized ghost bands fall into two sub-categories: (a) authorized under the will of the decedent and (b) authorized by agreement with the heirs, successors, and assigns to the rights of the name. Unauthorized ghost bands are those that exist in the face of opposition or those that prevail in a legal challenge. Unspecified ghost bands subsist with no preference or will given. In this case, more than one band might subsist and even remain unopposed if money is not an issue.

Ghost bands often do not have full access to unpublished, original music arrangements. In lieu of ghost bands, some leaders have opted to bestow their music and papers to academic institutions—in some cases, music schools devoted to research, restoration, and repertory studies; and in other cases, alma maters.

== Connotation ==
The phrase "ghost band" is sometimes viewed as an underhanded way (i.e., pejorative way) of saying that the ensemble is not the "real McCoy". Not being the "real McCoy" does not automatically mean "inferior." The current pool of virtuoso musicians, worldwide, is abundant. Moreover, ghost bands in recording studios are often composed of high-caliber musicians who might have otherwise been (a) unwilling to tour full-time back in the day or (b) too expensive or (c) both. Willingness to embrace the phrase is mixed. Legacy bands—those that have developed new, distinct identities and generated new works—value their roots and appreciate recognition for their contributions to the art. From a branding perspective, some repertory big bands, such as the Glenn Miller Orchestra, embrace the phrase as a statement of commitment to the preservation of the original sound.

== Dance bands and jazz ==
The Glenn Miller Orchestra has been performing for seventy-nine of the eighty-one years since Glenn Miller went missing. In dance band and big band jazz idioms, ghost bands typically perform the repertoire of the original band. Exceptions, however, include the Mingus Big Band, which performs and records new works in the creative spirit of its founder, Charles Mingus. The examples of Miller and Mingus are, in a sense, the same because both are striving to preserve the original models.

The estates of some notable band leaders, such as those of Stan Kenton and Maynard Ferguson, specifically forbid ghost bands in their names.

== Popular music ==
In classic rock/pop/R&B, a ghost band may refer to a group composed of musicians from newer generations and perhaps owned or led offstage by a secondary founding member who may perform or may not even perform with the group, as is the case with Blood, Sweat & Tears and The Platters. Many classic rock/pop acts still tour with musicians who were in the last stages of their success and were not founding or crucial members of those acts, such as the Little River Band. Other acts such as The Grass Roots, The Guess Who, The Temptations, and others, are now led by a drummer, bassist, or other background rhythm musician or backing vocalist who had little to do with the unique original sound (as compared to a lead instrumentalist or lead vocalist who made the sound identifiable to fans). These acts typically play at festivals, casinos, cruise ships, clubs, theaters and small venues, typically billed with other similar acts in "oldies packages," and are essentially tribute acts in all but name only.

== Notable ghost bands ==
Jazz

- Glenn Miller Orchestra
- Mingus Big Band
- Duke Ellington Orchestra
- Count Basie Orchestra
- The Modernaires
- Harry James Orchestra
- Les Elgart Orchestra
- Hal Mcintyre Orchestra
- Nelson Riddle Orchestra
- Cab Calloway Orchestra
- Tommy Dorsey Orchestra
- Les Brown's Band of Renown
- Russ Morgan Orchestra
- Sammy Kaye Orchestra
- Jimmy Dorsey Orchestra
- Jan Garber Orchestra
- Dick Jurgens Orchestra
- Gene Krupa Orchestra
- Guy Lombardo Orchestra
- Xavier Cugat Orchestra
- Artie Shaw Orchestra
- Lester Lanin Orchestra
- Woody Herman Orchestra
- Chick Webb
- Ted Heath
- Sun Ra Arkestra

Classic rock, R&B, and pop

- 38 Special (only frontman Don Barnes remains)
- Animals and Friends (leader Eric Burdon left in 1983, continued by drummer John Steel)
- April Wine (leader Myles Goodwyn died in December 2023, continued by guitarist Brian Greenway)
- Asia featuring John Payne (version of Asia fronted by non-original member of band)
- Atomic Rooster (leader Vincent Crane died in 1989, continued by guitarist Steve Bolton)
- Bob Jackson's Badfinger (version of Badfinger fronted by non-original member of band / frontmen Pete Ham and Tom Evans died in 1975 and 1983)
- Blackfoot (no original members since 2011)
- Blood, Sweat & Tears (no original members since 1977)
- Brian Poole & The Tremeloes (no original members since 1966)
- The Buzzcocks (leader Pete Shelley died in 2018, continued by guitarist Steve Diggle)
- Canned Heat (leader Bob Hite died in 1981 and was continued by drummer Adolfo "Fito" de la Parra)
- Chicago (trumpeter Lee Loughnane is currently the sole original member still performing with the group, following James Pankow and Robert Lamm's respective retirements from touring in 2026)
- Dave Dee, Dozy, Beaky, Mick & Tich (leader Dave Dee died in 2009 and was continued by Beaky)
- Dr. Feelgood (leader Lee Brilleaux died in 1994 and was continued by his band since 1983)
- Foghat (only drummer Roger Earl remains)
- Foreigner (sole original member & leader Mick Jones not touring as of 2023)
- The Four Tops (last original member, Duke Fakir, died in 2024; families of the original members are involved; group owned by Fakir's daughter, and features Lawrence Payton's eponymous son)
- The Fourmost (no original members since 1980)
- Gong (no original members since 2015)
- The Grass Roots (no original members since 2011)
- The Harry Chapin Band (three original members remaining: Steve Chapin, Big John Wallace, and Howard Fields)
- Herman's Hermits (namesake & lead singer Peter "Herman" Noone left in 1971)
- Iron Butterfly (no original members since 2020)
- Jack Russell's Great White (spinoff of Great White / leader Jack Russell died in 2024, continued by guitarist Tony Montana as "Once Bitten")
- Jefferson Starship (leader Paul Kantner died in 2016 and was continued by keyboardist David Freiberg; the current lineup contains only Freiberg and drummer Donny Baldwin from the band's original 1974-1984 incarnation)
- Little River Band (no original members since 1997)
- Lynyrd Skynyrd (no original members since guitarist Gary Rossington's death in 2023)
- Mahavishnu Project
- The Manfreds (version of Manfred Mann started up without the bands name sake member)
- Molly Hatchet (no original members since 2017)
- Nazareth (only bassist Pete Agnew remains)
- The Orchestra (only contains latter-day touring member Dave Scott-Morgan from parent band the Electric Light Orchestra; formerly known as "ELO Part II" and contained drummer Bev Bevan, vocalist & bassist Kelly Groucutt, violinist Mik Kaminski and orchestrator Louis Clark from the original ELO while excluding bandleader Jeff Lynne; Clark's eponymous son remains an active member of The Orchestra)
- Outlaws (leader Hughie Thomasson died in 2007, continued by guitarist Henry Paul)
- The Platters (no original members)
- Quiet Riot (leader Kevin DuBrow died in 2007, continued by bassist Rudy Sarzo)
- Riley's L.A. Guns (spinoff of L.A. Guns / leader Steve Riley died in 2023, continued by bassist Kelly Nickels)
- Smash Mouth (only bassist Paul de Lisle remains)
- Tangerine Dream (no original members since founder Edgar Froese's death in 2015)
- The Swinging Blue Jeans (no original members since 2010)
- Thin Lizzy (leader Phil Lynott died in 1986 and was continued by guitarist Scott Gorham)
- Three Dog Night (led by sole original member Danny Hutton)
- Toots and the Maytals (namesake & lead singer Frederick "Toots" Hibbert died in 2020, continued by other band members as "The Maytals")
- T-Square (leader Masahiro Andoh retired in 2021, continued by saxophonist Takeshi Itoh)
- Vanity Fare (no original members since 1979)
- Vixen (only drummer Roxy Petrucci remains)
- The Yardbirds (leader Keith Relf died in 1976, continued by drummer Jim McCarty)
- Yes (leader and bassist Chris Squire died in 2015, continued by guitarist Steve Howe; Howe became sole remaining bandmember from any pre-1980 lineup following drummer Alan White's death in 2022)

== Related musical terminology ==
- Tribute band – Tribute bands can also be ghost bands. Three fundamental distinctions: (1) tribute bands can play music of living artists, (2) tribute bands can be a one-time concert or recording by any group of musicians, and (3) tribute bands can showcase other subjects, such as a particular composer or arranger. This category can also refer to ad hoc groups that appear occasionally with a big-name leader and a number of star soloists and arrangers from the big-band era. Leaders who did this included Illinois Jacquet, Gerry Mulligan, and Louis Bellson.
- Cover band – Cover bands can also be ghost bands. A distinction is that cover bands can play music of living artists and are usually not confined to one artist.
- There are several well-known bands that have endured for decades—bands that are promoted and perceived to be continuations of the original. These types of bands are analogous to franchises, except, instead of multiple bands touring under the same name, only one band performs, but with a turnover of musicians. Examples include Tower of Power (currently in its fifty-ninth year).

== See also ==
- Zombie strip, a comic strip continued by one or more artists and/or authors after the death or retirement of its original creator(s)
- Ship of Theseus
