= Electric Light Orchestra Part Two (album) =

- US cover

Studio album by ELO Part II
- Released: July 1991 (US); 20 May 1991 (UK)
- Studios: Mill Studios, Cookham, UK; Angel Studios, Islington, London, UK; Rich Bitch Studios, Birmingham, UK; Fanfare Studios, Golden, Colorado, US; Capitol Recording Studios, Hollywood, California, US
- Genre: Rock
- Length: 42:03
- Labels: Scotti Bros.; Telstar
- Producer: Jeff Glixman

ELO Part II chronology
Electric Light Orchestra Part Two (1991)	Performing ELO's Greatest Hits Live (1992)

Singles from Electric Light Orchestra Part Two
- 1. "For the Love of a Woman" Released: July 1991 (US); 2. "Honest Men" Released: 15 April 1991; 3. "Thousand Eyes" Released: 24 June 1991; 4. "Kiss Me Red" Released: 1991 (Japan)

Alternative cover
- UK cover

Electric Light Orchestra Part Two is the debut album by ELO Part II, released in 1991. In June 1991, the single Honest Men charted at number 36 on the Dutch Single Top 100 chart. The track "Kiss Me Red" is a cover of the theme to the short-lived TV series Dreams, which was also covered by Cheap Trick on their 1986 album The Doctor and released as a Europe-only single.

The album was reissued in 1991 as Part Two: Once Upon a Time, and again in 2021 by Renaissance Records on CD and LP, with the CD release including bonus tracks.

== Background ==
After Electric Light Orchestra (ELO) was disbanded in 1986, Bev Bevan approached Jeff Lynne to record another album; Lynne declined. So in 1989 Bev Bevan formed a new band with a new lineup named ELO; however; Lynne objected to the use of ELO's name. After a lawsuit, a compromise was reached: the new name of the band would be ELO Part II. In addition to the new name Lynne would also receive a share of royalties from ELO Part II's sales.

Asides from Bevan, orchestral arranger Louis Clark was the only other member or affiliate of the original ELO to be prominently involved with the album, although former ELO violinist Mik Kaminski appears as a guest on one track and Wilfred Gibson (Kaminski's predecessor in the original ELO) features as an uncredited session instrumentalist.

== Reception ==
Professional ratings
Review scores
Source	Rating
AllMusic	2.5/5 stars
Encyclopedia of Popular Music	1/5 stars
MusicHound	woof!
The Rolling Stone Album Guide	1/5 stars

In 1991, Music & Media magazine declared in their review that ELO Part II "have succeeded in reviving the old trademark sound of E.L.O." In his retrospective review, AllMusic's Doug Stone noted the album as "a decent fabrication of a begone [sic] fab era".

== Track listing ==
All lyrics and lead vocals by Eric Troyer, except where noted

Original LP

Side one
No.	Title	Writer(s)	Lead vocals	Length
1.	"Hello"	Troyer, Bev Bevan, Pete Haycock, Neil Lockwood		1:17
2.	"Honest Men"			6:13
3.	"Every Night"	Troyer, Ken Cummings	Lockwood	3:15
4.	"Once upon a Time"	Bevan, Haycock	Haycock	4:18
5.	"Heartbreaker"	Bevan, Haycock	Lockwood	4:55

Side two
No.	Title	Writer(s)	Lead vocals	Length
6.	"Thousand Eyes"			4:49
7.	"For the Love of a Woman"			4:01
8.	"Kiss Me Red"	Billy Steinberg, Tom Kelly	Lockwood	4:01
9.	"Heart of Hearts"			4:18
10.	"Easy Street"	Bevan, Haycock	Haycock	4:56
Total length:				42:03

Tracks included on 2021 reissue:

No.	Title	Writer(s)	Lead vocals	Length
11.	"Love for Sale" (B-side to "Honest Men")	Bevan, Haycock	Lockwood	4:14
12.	"Kiss Me Red" (live)	Steinberg, Kelly	Lockwood	4:03
13.	"Thousand Eyes" (live)			4:30
14.	"Honest Men" (live)			6:22
15.	"Every Night" (live)	Troyer, Cummings	Lockwood	4:04
16.	"Blackberry Way" (live)	Roy Wood	Troyer, Kelly Groucutt, Phil Bates	3:50
17.	"Honest Men" (single video edit)			3:27

== Personnel ==
Personnel according to the booklet.

ELO Part II

- Bev Bevan – drums, percussion, backing vocals
- Pete Haycock – guitars, bass, lead and backing vocals
- Eric Troyer – keyboards, lead and backing vocals
- Neil Lockwood – lead and backing vocals

Additional personnel

- Louis Clark – string arrangements
- Mik Kaminski – violin (on "Heartbreaker")
- Wilf Gibson – violin (uncredited)
- Jeff Glixman – producer
- Don Arden – executive producer
- Mark Derryberry – engineer
- Jonathan Miller – engineer
- Alison Leaberry-Smith – engineer
- John Etchels – engineer
- Bob Norberg – editing
- Kevin Reeves – editing
- Wally Traugott – mastering
- Ron McPherson – art, graphics, design

== Charts ==
Chart (1991)	Peak position
Dutch Albums (Album Top 100)	39
Swiss Albums (Schweizer Hitparade)	22
UK Albums (Official Charts)	34
