= Fusion – Live in London =

- VHS Cover

Video by Electric Light Orchestra
- Released: January 1991 (VHS)
- Recorded: 1976
- Genre: Rock
- Director: Mike Mansfield

Electric Light Orchestra chronology
Out of the Blue: Live at Wembley (1980)	Fusion – Live in London (1991)	The Very Best of ELO (1991)

Fusion – Live in London is a concert film by Electric Light Orchestra, recorded at the New Victoria Theatre in London on 20 June 1976. The concert was a part of the band's Face the Music tour. It was released in VHS format in 1991 (Pickwick PTR 2152).

Aside from Out of the Blue: Live at Wembley, this is the only concert footage of the classic lineup known to exist (with Zoom Tour Live and a VH1 Storytellers appearance from 2001 forming the only other pieces of live footage). This provides a rare look at ELO before the Out of the Blue tour, lacking the vast UFO stage (which caused numerous performance and filming difficulties) as well as CBS' often intrusive video editing techniques.

On 9 August 2010 the concert finally saw its official DVD release by Eagle Rock Entertainment in the UK as a part of their compilation Live – The Early Years, then in the United States on 24 August 2010 as a slightly edited release.

== Track listing ==
1. "Poker"
2. "Nightrider"
3. "Showdown"
4. "Eldorado Overture"
5. "Can't Get It Out of My Head"
6. "Poorboy (The Greenwood)"
7. "Illusions in G Major"
8. "Strange Magic"
9. "10538 Overture"/"Do Ya"
10. "Evil Woman"
11. "Ma-Ma-Ma-Belle"
12. "Roll Over Beethoven"

Some songs from the concert were missing from the final release, including "Eldorado", "Eldorado Finale", "Fire on High", and some solos.

== Personnel ==
- Jeff Lynne – guitars and vocals
- Bev Bevan – drums, percussion, backing vocals
- Richard Tandy – electric piano, Minimoog, mellotron, grand piano
- Kelly Groucutt – bass guitar, vocals
- Mik Kaminski – violin
- Hugh McDowell – cello
- Melvyn Gale – cello, piano
