= Live: The Early Years =

Video by Electric Light Orchestra
- Released: 9 August 2010 (UK); 24 August 2010 (US)
- Recorded: 1973, 1974, 1976
- Genre: Rock
- Label: Eagle Rock Entertainment
- Director: Mike Mansfield

Electric Light Orchestra chronology
In Performance (2010)	Live: The Early Years (2010)	Jeff Lynne's ELO: Live in Hyde Park (2015)

Professional ratings
Review scores
Source	Rating
PopMatters	6/10 stars
Record Collector	3/5 stars

Live: The Early Years is a UK DVD compilation of three Electric Light Orchestra concerts from the 1970s that includes Fusion – Live in London (1976) along with two other never before released live performances at Brunel University (1973) and on a German television programme Rockpalast (1974), Eagle Rock Entertainment released it on 9 August 2010. The US had a slightly edited release on 24 August 2010.

== Track listing ==
Brunel University 1973

1. "King of the Universe"
2. "Ma-Ma-Ma Belle"
3. "In the Hall of the Mountain King"
4. "Great Balls of Fire"

Germany 1974 – On The Third Day Tour, Live At Rockpalast, Studio Hamburg, Hamburg, Germany, Friday, October 4th, 1974

5. "Daybreaker"
6. "Showdown"
7. "Day Tripper"^{[1]}
8. "Orange Blossom Special"
9. "Ma-Ma-Ma Belle"
10. "In the Hall of the Mountain King"
11. "Great Balls of Fire"
12. "Roll Over Beethoven"^{[1]}

London 1976 – Face The Music Tour, Fusion Live, The New Victoria Theatre, London, England, Sunday, June 20th, 1976.

13. "Poker"
14. "Nightrider"
15. "Showdown"
16. "Eldorado Overture"
17. "Can't Get It Out of My Head"
18. "Poor Boy (The Greenwood)"
19. "Illusions in G Major"
20. "Strange Magic"
21. "10538 Overture"
22. "Do Ya"
23. "Evil Woman"
24. "Ma-Ma-Ma Belle"
25. "Roll Over Beethoven"^{[1]}
- Bonus Feature: Rockpalast interview

Notes

- 1 Not included on the US release.

== Personnel ==
- Jeff Lynne – vocals, guitar
- Bev Bevan – drums
- Richard Tandy – keyboards
- Mik Kaminski – violin
- Hugh McDowell – cello
- Mike de Albuquerque – bass, 73/74
- Kelly Groucutt – bass, 76
- Mike Edwards – cello, 73/74
- Melvyn Gale – cello, 76
