= Moment of Truth (ELO Part II album) =

Studio album by ELO Part II
- Released: 3 October 1994
- Genre: Rock
- Length: 53:59
- Label: Curb Records, Edel Music
- Producer: Stephan Galfas

ELO Part II chronology
Performing ELO's Greatest Hits Live (1992)	Moment of Truth (1994)	One Night (1996)

Singles from Moment of Truth
- 1. "Power of a Million Lights" Released: 25 July 1994; 2. "Breakin' Down the Walls" Released: 10 October 1994; 3. "One More Tomorrow" Released: 1996 (Germany)

Professional ratings
Review scores
Source	Rating
AllMusic	2/5 stars
Encyclopedia of Popular Music	1/5 stars
MusicHound	1.5/5 stars
The Rolling Stone Album Guide	1/5 stars

Moment of Truth is the second and final studio album by ELO Part II, released in October 1994. Recorded following a period of significant lineup changes within the group, the album features original ELO alumni Bev Bevan, Louis Clark, Kelly Groucutt and Mik Kaminski, the latter two having recently joined Part II as full-time members at the time of recording.

The cover illustration by Graham Reynolds depicts an incandescent light bulb shattering. The light bulb image continues a visual theme that began with the light bulb depicted on the cover of Electric Light Orchestra's debut album. Moment of Truth and the single "One More Tomorrow" would determine if ELO Part II would continue re-establishing themselves in America. "The Fox" was originally from the 1985 Kelly Groucutt EP, We Love Animals.

The album was reissued in 2021 by Renaissance Records on CD and 2×LP, the first time Moment of Truth was available on LP. Both the CD and LP releases included bonus tracks.

== Reception ==
In 1994, Music & Media called Moment of Truth "thin" compared to ELO Part II's predecessor Electric Light Orchestra (ELO). They also noted that the way ELO Part II handled symphonic rock was similar to the way Alan Parsons handled it. In an earlier issue that year, Music & Media noted that the single "Power of a Million Lights" had a sound consistent with ELO under Jeff Lynne, the only difference being the change from strings to synthesizers.

== Track listing ==
Original CD

No.	Title	Writer(s)	Lead vocals	Length
1.	"Moment of Truth (Overture)"	Louis Clark		4:07
2.	"Breakin' Down the Walls"	Phil Bates	Bates	4:27
3.	"Power of a Million Lights"	Eric Troyer	Troyer	4:54
4.	"Interlude 3"	Clark		0:32
5.	"One More Tomorrow"	Bev Bevan, Mik Kaminski, Bates	Bates	5:00
6.	"Don't Wanna"	Troyer	Troyer	3:41
7.	"Voices"	Kaminski, Bates	Bates	4:27
8.	"Interlude 2"	Clark		0:20
9.	"Vixen"			0:04
10.	"The Fox"	Kelly Groucutt	Groucutt	4:35
11.	"Love or Money"	Troyer, Bates	Troyer	4:08
12.	"Blue Violin"	Groucutt, Kaminski	Groucutt	1:10
13.	"Whiskey Girls"	Bevan, Bates	Bates	3:37
14.	"Interlude 1"	Clark		0:58
15.	"Twist of the Knife"	Bevan, Groucutt, Bates	Groucutt	4:30
16.	"So Glad You Said Goodbye"	Bevan, Troyer, Bates	Troyer	4:12
17.	"Underture"	Clark		2:52
18.	"The Leaving"			0:25
Total length:				53:59

Tracks included on 2021 reissue:

No.	Title	Writer(s)	Length
19.	"Local Hero (A Story Sad But True)" (demo)	Glen Burtnik, Troyer	3:48
20.	"Power of a Million Lights" (demo)		4:49
21.	"Love or Money" (demo)		3:56
22.	"Rain Down Fire" (demo)		5:19
23.	"Breakin' Down the Walls" (radio edit)		3:51
24.	"Power of a Million Lights" (radio edit)		3:50

== Personnel ==
ELO Part II

- Bev Bevan – drums
- Mik Kaminski – violin
- Louis Clark – orchestral keyboards and orchestral arrangements
- Kelly Groucutt – bass and vocals
- Eric Troyer – keyboards and vocals
- Phil Bates – guitar and vocals

Additional musicians

- Percussion: Hossam Ramzy
- Strings: The London Session Orchestra; leader: Gavyn Wright (included Wilf Gibson)
