= The Salt in My Tears =

The Salt in My Tears may refer to:

- "The Salt in My Tears" (Dolly Parton song)
- "The Salt in My Tears" (Martin Briley song)
