= No Rewind =

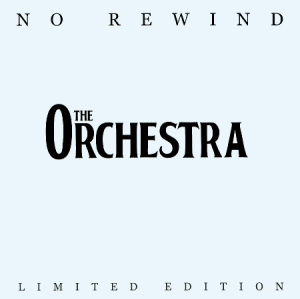
- 2001 cover

Studio album by The Orchestra
- Released: 2001
- Studios: Monkey Den and Cabin Sound, Los Angeles; Charleston Road, New Jersey; Smythe & Co, New York
- Genre: Rock
- Length: 45:32 (Original release); 44:02 (Reissue)
- Producers: Jim Jacobsen, Eric Troyer, Parthenon Huxley

The Orchestra chronology
One Night – Live in Australia (1996)	No Rewind (2001)	The Orchestra Live (2008)

Alternative cover
- 2004 cover

Alternative cover
- 2006 cover

Professional ratings
Review scores
Source	Rating
theLogBook.com	4/4

No Rewind is the debut album by rock band The Orchestra, released in 2001. Released soon after the group's rebranding from ELO Part II, it remains their sole released studio album.

== Overview ==
The album was recorded without financial support from any record labels and was produced by Eric Troyer, Parthenon Huxley and Jim Jacobsen; Troyer and Huxley likewise served as the album's primary songwriters. Ten tracks and more were recorded in studios in Los Angeles and New York over a 2 1/2-year period. Among the album's more notable tracks include the mournful closing track "Before We Go" - a collaboration between Troyer, Huxley and bandmate Kelly Groucutt, who originated the song's lyrics as an allusion to the Irish Troubles - "Over London Skies" - extensively reworked by Huxley in 1999 from a set of rough lyrics penned by Bev Bevan prior to the latter's departure from ELO Part II - and a significantly re-arranged cover of "Twist and Shout" which begins in a slow, plaintive minor key with arpeggiated chords before building to the familiar, rocking major progression.

The album was originally only available during their UK tour in 2001. It was reissued in 2004 in Argentina under the label Art Music and again in 2006 in the UK (with no label) with an edited track 10.

theLogBook.com noted the album as being very Beatlesque and also noted the song "Can’t Wait To See You" as "close as one can imagine to a lost Jeff Lynne song".

== Cover art ==
Three versions were released with three different cover designs. The first pressing cover art was simply silver/grey with the band logo in black in the style of the Beatles logo. The second, designed by band guitarist Parthenon Huxley, showed a reel-to-reel tape deck carved in stone. The third was designed by George Reed, the long-time art/film director for both ELO Part II and the Orchestra. This edition pictures a man standing at a computer console as it spills out piles of data tape with the words NO REWIND spelled out in L.E.D. letters on an indicator screen. Throughout the image are several hidden references to the band's past.

== Track listing ==
All lyrics and lead vocals by Eric Troyer, except where noted

2001 – Original CD
No.	Title	Writer(s)	Lead vocals	Length
1.	"Jewel & Johnny"	Parthenon Huxley	Huxley	3:56
2.	"Say Goodbye"			4:26
3.	"No Rewind"			4:08
4.	"Over London Skies"	Huxley, Bev Bevan	Huxley	4:33
5.	"Twist and Shout"	Phil Medley, Bert Russell		6:34
6.	"Can't Wait to See You"	Huxley	Huxley	3:28
7.	"If Only"			4:38
8.	"I Could Write a Book"			3:13
9.	"Let Me Dream"	Troyer, Mik Kaminski		4:01
10.	"Before We Go"	Kelly Groucutt, Troyer, Huxley	Groucutt	6:36
Total length:				45:32

Alternative edit of the track 10 on the reissues
No.	Title	Writer(s)	Lead vocals	Length
10.	"Before We Go"	Groucutt, Troyer, Huxley	Groucutt	5:04
Total length:				44:02

== Personnel ==
Personnel according to the booklet.

The Orchestra

- Kelly Groucutt – bass and vocals
- Eric Troyer – keyboards and vocals
- Parthenon Huxley – guitar and vocals
- Gordon Townsend – drums
- Mik Kaminski – violin
- Louis Clark – keyboards

Additional personnel

- Jim Jacobsen – engineer, mixer
- John Regna – executive producer
- James O'Connell – engineer ("Jewel & Johnny", "Before We Go")
- CJ de Villar – mixer ("Jewel & Johnny", "Before We Go")
- Stephane Guyot – string session engineer
- Greg Calbi – mastering
