= Honest Man =

Honest Man or The Honest Man may refer to:

== Music ==
- "Honest Man", from Bajour, 1965
- "Honest Man" (song), George Fox
- "Honest Man", a song by Lowell George from Thanks, I'll Eat It Here, 1979
- "Honest Man", a song by Ben Platt from Sing to Me Instead, 2019

== Other ==
- Honest Man: The Life of R. Budd Dwyer, a 2010 documentary film that chronicles the scandal that led to R. Budd Dwyer's public suicide
- Tom 'Honest Man' Coughlan (born 1881), an Irish hurler

== See also ==
- "Honest Men", a song by ELO Part II from Electric Light Orchestra Part Two, 1991
