= Parthenon Huxley =

American musician, singer and producer (1956–2026)

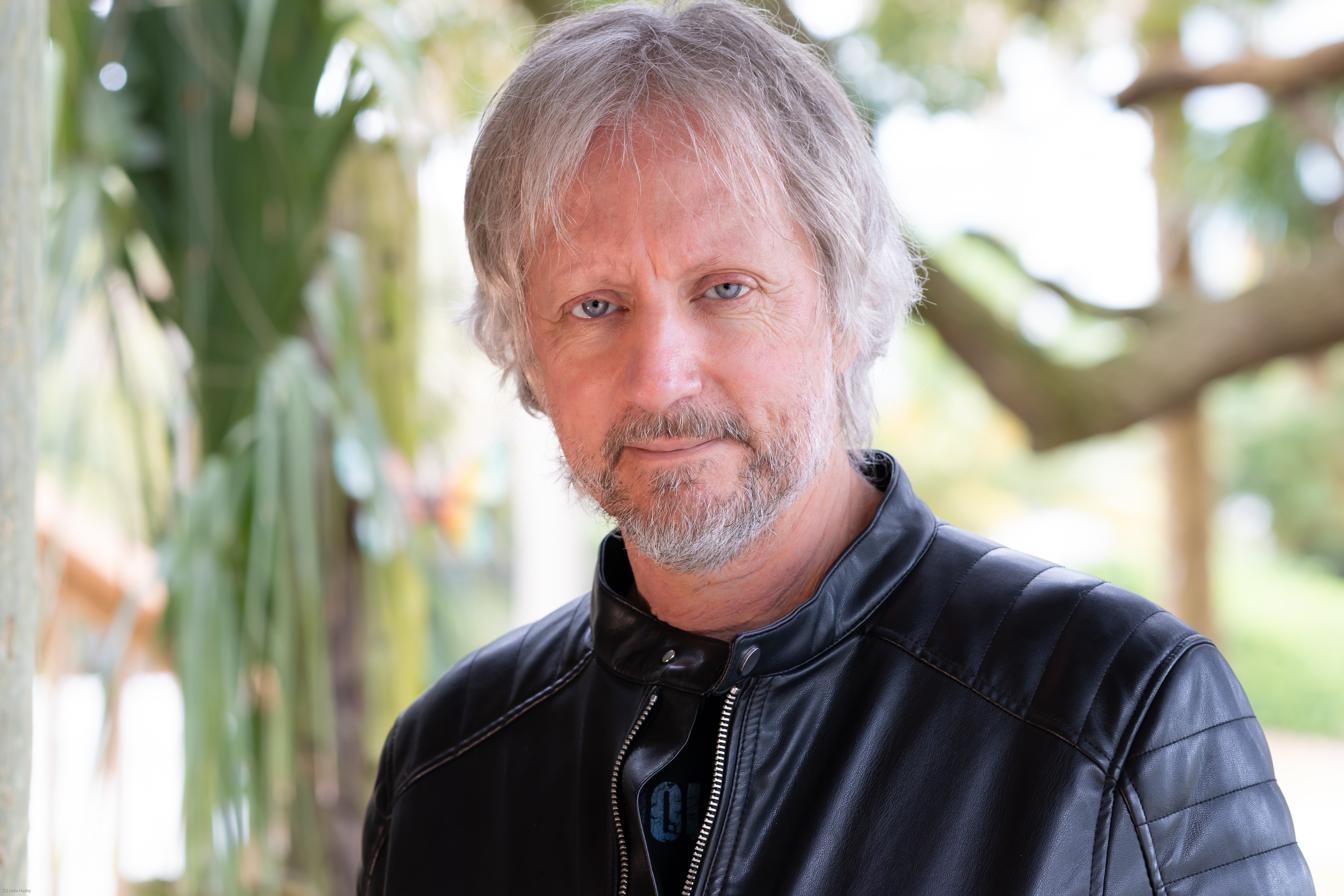
- Huxley in 2021

Background information
- Also known as: P. Hux; Rick Rock; Rick Miller
- Born: Richard Willett Miller; January 19, 1956; Baton Rouge, Louisiana, U.S.
- Died: January 30, 2026 (aged 70) Chevy Chase, Maryland, U.S.
- Instruments: Guitar; vocals
- Years active: 1980–2026
- Formerly of: The Orchestra; ELO Part II
- Website: parthenonhuxley.com

Parthenon Huxley (January 19, 1956 – January 30, 2026), born Richard Willett Miller, was an American musician, singer, songwriter and producer who is known for his solo albums and for his involvement in ELO Part II and The Orchestra, both of which are latter-day offshoots of the 1970s–80s symphonic rock band Electric Light Orchestra. He also made cameo appearances in several films including Dragon: The Bruce Lee Story and The Flintstones.

== Early life ==
Huxley was born in Baton Rouge, Louisiana, on January 19, 1956. He grew up in New Jersey and Athens, Greece, before moving to North Carolina to attend UNC-Chapel Hill. His stage name (later legal name) honors two of his varied interests: his love for Greece, and the British writer Aldous Huxley. He began his recording career as guitarist on Matt Barrett's 1980 EP The Ruse (Moonlight Records), produced by Don Dixon, with Mitch Easter being another notable musician (as a drummer) on the album.

== The Blazers, P. Hux and VeG ==
His touring career began as a member of the Chapel Hill, North Carolina, rock band The Blazers (not the LA-based band of the same name). The band was founded and released their first album before his involvement; for their second album, The Blazers consisted of Huxley (credited under his original name Rick Miller), Sherman Tate (lead & harmony vocals, rhythm guitar), Ronnie Taylor (drums & percussion) and Lee Gildersleeve (bass). This iteration of the group issued the album How to Rock: Ten Easy Lessons (Moonlight Records, 1980), again produced by Don Dixon, and then broke up.

His first solo recording (released under the pseudonym Rick Rock was the self-produced, self-financed single "Buddha, Buddha" / "Sputnik" (Big Groovy, 1983). Despite its modest recording budget of US $400 "Buddha, Buddha" was named one of the ten best records ever made in North Carolina by the Greensboro Record. During this period Huxley also toured as guitarist with Don Dixon under the name Me & Dixon. He relocated to Los Angeles in 1987 and signed with Columbia Records; the following year he recorded his first solo album, Sunny Nights (Columbia 1988), produced by Huxley and David Kahne. Three of its tracks ("Double Our Numbers", "Guest Host for the Holy Ghost" and "Chance to Be Loved") were released as singles during that year. Although the album received favorable reviews (Rolling Stone Magazine called it a "monumental debut"), it did not sell well and this ended his association with Columbia.

It was five years before Huxley's next album; in the intervening period he co-produced the two solo albums by Eels frontman E, 1992's A Man Called E and 1994's Broken Toy Shop. The first single from A Man Called E ("Hello Cruel World" – co-written by Huxley) reached No. 8 on the Modern Rock chart. Huxley also produced an eponymous album with power pop singer Kyle Vincent (Carport/Hollywood Records). The album's first single, "Wake Me Up (When the World's Worth Waking Up For)", reached No. 101 on Billboard's singles chart and stayed there for 11 weeks, setting a curious record for "bubbling under" the Hot 100.

Huxley's next album, Deluxe, was credited to P. Hux, a power-pop trio comprising Huxley, Gordon Townsend (drums, vocals) and Rob Miller (bass, vocals). The album was released in the US in 1995 on the Black Olive label, and was also released in Japan, Australia and France (where it was retitled Every Minute). The songs on the album were largely inspired by Huxley's recent marriage to screenwriter Janet Heaney. The album was well received by critics and was voted as 1995 Album of the Year by Audites Magazine. A single from the album, "Every Minute", appeared on the Rhino Records compilation Poptopia! Power Pop Classics of the '90s.

Huxley's next recording was the self-titled album recorded by Huxley's side project VeG (1997), another three-piece group with Winston Watson (drums, lap steel) and Paul Martinez (bass, background vocals). Watson was Bob Dylan's drummer for five years in the '90s.

== ELO Part II and The Orchestra ==
In January 1997, Huxley's wife, Janet, died, and it was several years before he resumed his solo career. In the meantime, he joined Electric Light Orchestra Part II in January 1999, replacing singer-guitarist Phil Bates, and he toured with them through the year. In November that year Bev Bevan played his last show with the band; in early 2000 he issued a press statement announcing that the group had dissolved, and he then sold his 50% share of the rights to the ELO name back to the group's founder, Jeff Lynne. The remaining members then recruited drummer Gordon Townsend and, following legal action by Lynne, renamed itself The Orchestra.

Huxley restarted his solo career in 2001 with two albums. The second P. Hux studio album, Purgatory Falls, was a deeply personal and sometimes harrowing song cycle that chronicled the devastating experience of his wife's untimely death. Huxley signed with Universal and a single, "I Loved Everything", reached No. 1 on Rolling Stone's Exclusive Download Chart. This was followed by a solo live album, Live in Your Living Room. Later in 2001 he contributed to The Orchestra's No Rewind, which features four songs written or co-written by Huxley: "Jewel and Johnny", "Can't Wait to See You", "Over London Skies" and "Before We Go."

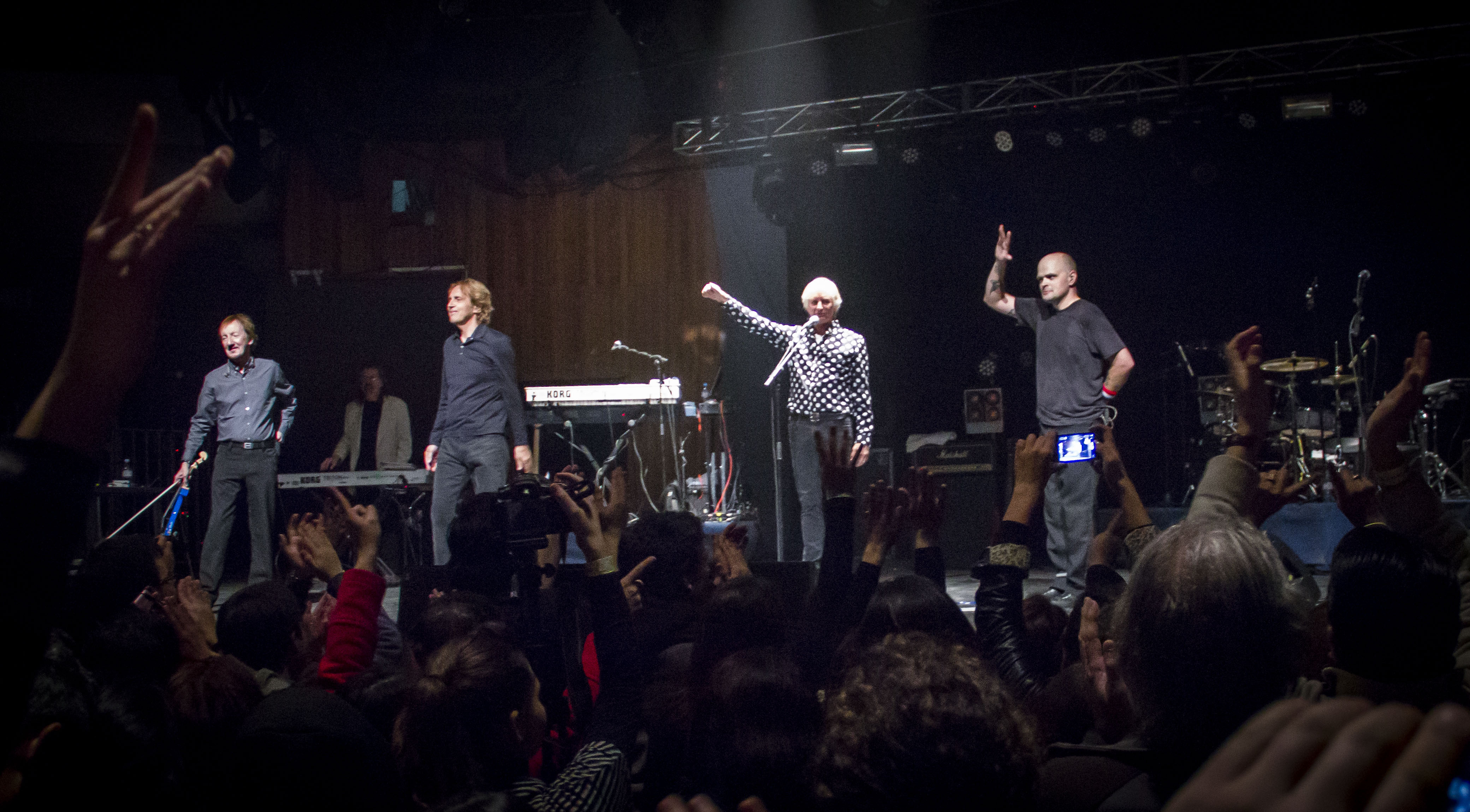
The Orchestra in 2013

Huxley followed No Rewind with another solo acoustic live album, In Your Parlour (Nine18 Records), in 2003 and then began work on Homemade Spaceship, an album of ELO covers commissioned by Lakeshore Records of Hollywood, California. Homemade Spaceship: The Music of ELO as Performed by P. Hux was awarded 2005 Tribute Album of the Year by Just Plain Folks, the world's largest online musicians community. The band continued to tour with this lineup until 2007, when Huxley left the band to spend more time with his family. Huxley was replaced by Bates, who rejoined The Orchestra after a nine-year absence. In October 2011, Phil Bates again left the band and Huxley returned as Orchestra guitarist and singer. With Huxley's return, The Orchestra completed a 17-date tour of Eastern Europe in December 2011.

== Later career ==
Huxley moved to Maryland in 2004, where he began work on the third P. Hux studio album, Kiss the Monster. It was released in 2007 by English label Voiceprint in conjunction with Nine18 (Huxley's imprint) and BeanBagOne, a label owned by Huxley's American manager David Bean of Carmel, California. Kiss the Monster was nominated for 'Album of the Year' by Just Plain Folks.

In 2006 Nine18/Not Lame Records released Mile High Fan, an album of songs recorded in Los Angeles in the late 1980s and early 1990s. Tracks from Mile High Fan had originally been intended for the follow-up to 1988's Sunny Nights.

In 2011, Huxley released Tracks & Treasure Vol. 1, a collection of songs that had appeared on compilations as well as previously unreleased master recordings. The album featured performances by McCartney guitarist Rusty Anderson, Go-Go's drummer Gina Schock, ELO/ELO Part II/The Orchestra violinist Mik Kaminski, and others. The album's title was a pun, referencing "trash and treasure" days in Maryland.

On April 2, 2013, Nine18 Records issued Thank You Bethesda, a collection of new songs that Huxley considers some of his best work. A successful Kickstarter campaign in the fall of 2012 aided in the album's post-production and release. The 24-page CD booklet contains names and pictures of Huxley's Kickstarter supporters.

In Fall 2015, Nine18 Records released P. Hux Live Deluxe, a remastered 1996 recording of the original P. Hux lineup captured live in Durham, North Carolina.

On September 18, 2018, Nine18 Records released This Is The One, Huxley's most recent collection of new songs and featuring the singles "Just Sayin'" and "Running Home To You." The album's songs and sounds were hailed by well-known fans of Huxley, including Don Dixon, Al Stewart, Rusty Anderson and many more.

== Death ==
Huxley died in Chevy Chase, Maryland, on January 30, 2026, at the age of 70.

== Discography ==
=== Studio albums ===
- How to Rock (1980)
- Sunny Nights (1988)
- Deluxe (1995)
- VeG (1997)
- No Rewind (2001)
- Purgatory Falls (2001)
- Homemade Spaceship: The Music of ELO as Performed by P. Hux (2005)
- Mile High Fan (2006)
- Kiss the Monster (2007)
- Tracks & Treasure Vol.1 (2011)
- Thank You Bethesda (2013)
- This Is The One (2018)
- As Good As Advertised (2023)

=== Singles ===
- "Buddha, Buddha" b/w "Sputnik" (1982) (as Rick Rock)
- "Chance to Be Loved" (1988)
- "Double Our Numbers" (1988)
- "Guest Host for the Holy Ghost" (1988)
- "It'll Be Alright" (1995)
- "Every Minute" (1995)
- "Here Comes the Savior" (1995)
- "I Loved Everything" (2001)
- "Love Is The Greatest Thing" (2014)
- "Just Sayin'" (2018)

=== Live albums ===
- Live in Your Living Room (2001)
- In Your Parlour (2003)
- The Orchestra LIVE (2006)
- Live Deluxe (2015)
