= Eric Troyer =

American musician

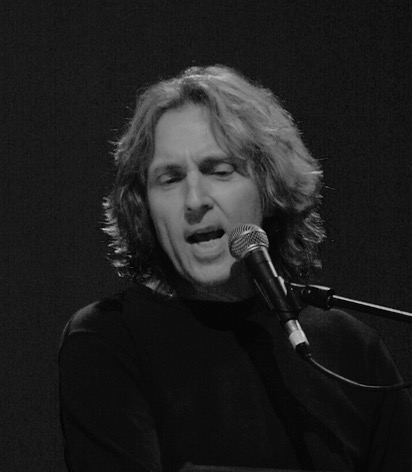
Eric Troyer

Eric Lee Troyer (born 10 April 1949) is an American keyboardist, singer, songwriter, and occasional guitarist. Troyer was a founding member of ELO Part II, having been recruited by bandleader Bev Bevan in 1988. He wrote a substantial quantity of the material on the band's three albums: Electric Light Orchestra Part Two, Moment of Truth, and One Night Live in Australia. He also wrote a large amount of its successor the Orchestra's album No Rewind.

== Life and career ==
Troyer has performed on various albums as a session musician and backing vocalist, including albums by John Lennon, Bonnie Tyler, and Celine Dion.

Troyer performed on the movie soundtracks for Footloose, Chicago, Flashdance, and Streets of Fire.

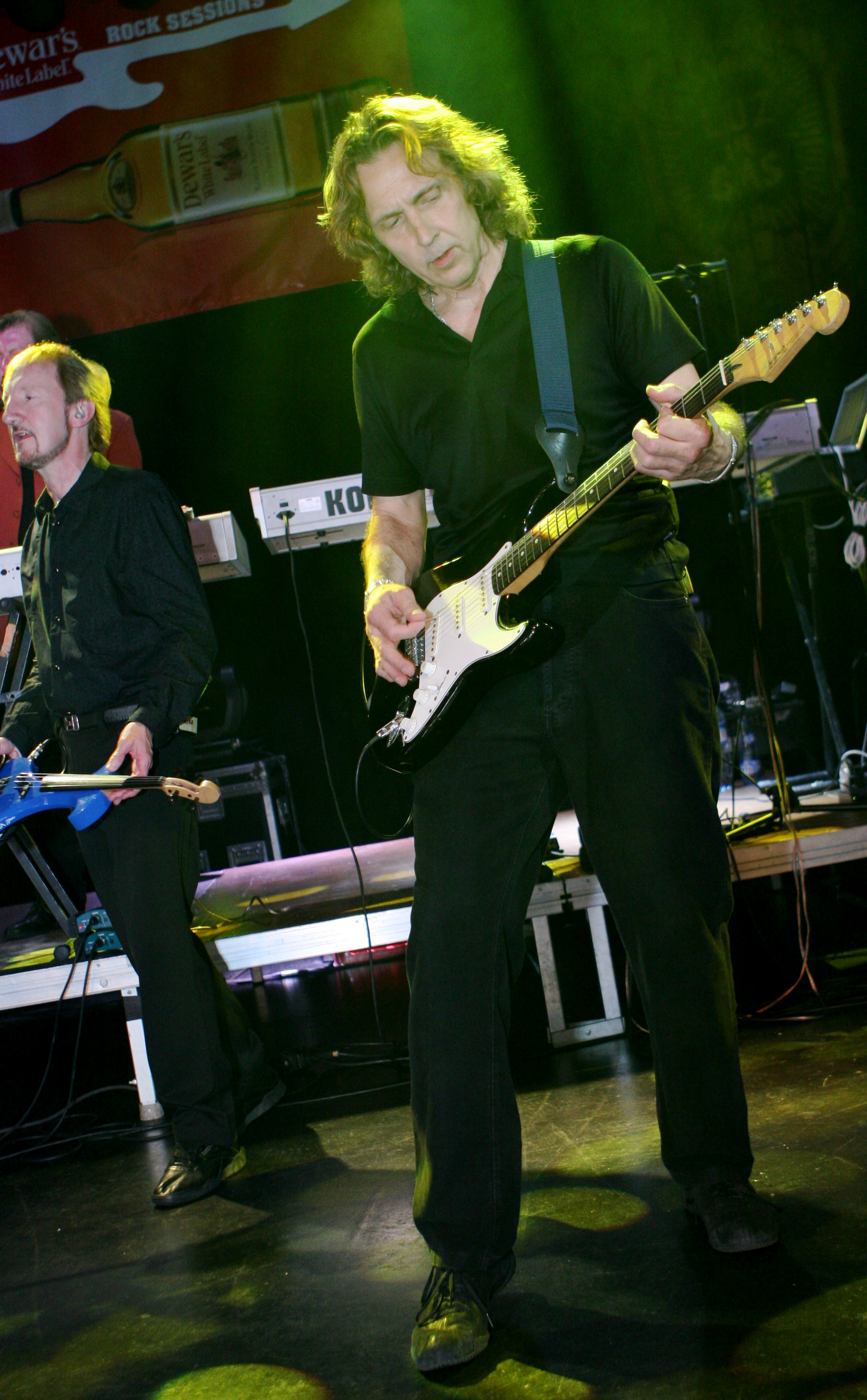
Troyer (right) with the Orchestra in 2008.

In 1988 Troyer co-founded the Electric Light Orchestra Part II with the Move/E.L.O. drummer Bev Bevan. In 2000, ELO Part II was renamed to the Orchestra. Troyer has also written and performed music for various ad campaigns, including Kool-Aid and IBM.

In 1980, Troyer had a minor solo hit with "Mirage", peaking at No. 92 in the Hot 100 chart. However it fared better on the AC, peaking at No. 43. The song was Troyer's only charting single in Australia, peaking at number 97. An accompanying album titled String of Pearls was recorded, but never officially released. Thirteen years later, he did release a solo CD, Model Citizen.

Troyer is married to writer/filmmaker Kee Kee Buckley, with whom he owns the production company Ad Hoc Media Partners.

== Discography ==
Eric Troyer Discography Vocals = V; Composer = C; Keyboards = K; Producer = P; Engineer = E; Arranger = A
BAND	ALBUM	LABEL	ROLE	YEAR
1994	1994	A&M Records	V	1978
Aerosmith	Draw the Line	Columbia	V	1977
Air Supply	Making Love Out of Nothing at All	Arista	V	1983
Air Supply	Greatest Hits	Arista	V	1983
Air Supply	Greatest Hits	Arista	V	1988
Peter Allen	Making Every Moment Count	RCA Victor	V	1990
Artful Dodger	Artful Dodger	Columbia, Pilot Records, Inc.	V, K	1975
Artful Dodger	Artful Dodger	Pendulum Entertainment Group	V, K	1997
Artful Dodger	The Complete Columbia Recordings	Real Gone Music, Sony Music Entertainment	V, K	2017
Bang Tango	Dancin' On Coals	MCA Records, Mechanic Records	V	1991
Blackjack (Michael Bolton)	Worlds Apart	Polydor	V	1980
Blackjack (Michael Bolton)	Anthology	Lemon Recordings	V	2006
Blue Rose	Blue Rose	Estate Record Corporation	V	1983
Martin Briley	Fear of the Unknown	Mercury	V	1981
Martin Briley	Dangerous Moments	Mercury	V	1985
Martin Briley	The Mercury Years	Hip-O Select, Mercury	V	2005
Catherine Marie Charlton	Undershore	River Dawn Productions	E	2004
Catherine Marie Charlton	I Dream About This World: The Wyeth Album	Phil's Records/ Spotted Peccary	V, E	2018
Catherine Marie Charlton	Maiden's Voyage	River Dawn Productions	E	2015
Catherine Marie Charlton	Red Leaf, Grey Sky: Piano Improvisations	River Dawn Productions	E	2011
Chardeau	In Terra Cognita ?	L Records	V	2019
Chardeau	Ombres & Lumière : In Terra Cognita 2	L Records	V	2023
China	Go All the Way	Vertigo	V	1991
Cinderella	Heartbreak Station	Mercury	V	1987
Cinderella	Gold	Mercury/ UMe	V	2006
Clarence Clemons & Red Bank Robbers	Rescue	Columbia	V	1983
Clarence Clemons & Red Bank Robbers	Rescue/Hero	Columbia	V	1999
Compilation Album	The Best Smooth Jazz Ever	GRP/Universal	V	2002
Peter Criss	Let Me Rock You	Casablanca	V	1982
Miles Davis	1986–1991: The Warner Years	Warner Music France, Rhino Records	V	2011
Taylor Dayne	Original Sin	Arista	V	1994
Rick Derringer	Guitars And Women	Razor & Tie	V	1979
Karla De Vito	Is This a Cool World or What?	Epic	V	1981
Celine Dion	Falling into You	Columbia	V	1996
Celine Dion	The Power of the Dream	Epic	V	1996
Celine Dion	Let's Talk About Love	Columbia	V	1997
Celine Dion	These Are Special Times	Columbia	V	1998
Celine Dion	All the Way... A Decade of Song	Columbia	V	1999
Celine Dion	My Love: Ultimate Essential Collection	Columbia	V	2008
Celine Dion	The Collection: Let's Talk About Love/ Falling into You/ A New Day Has Come	Sony Music, Legacy Recordings	V	2009
Celine Dion	The Essential Celine Dion	Columbia, Sony Music	V	2011
Disney	Mickey's Rock Around the Mouse	Walt Disney	V, C	1987
Disney	Happily Ever After	Walt Disney	V, C	2010
Disney	Minnie n' Me – Songs Just For Girls	Walt Disney	C	2011
Plácido Domingo	Goya...A Life in Song	CBS Recordings Inc.	V	1988
Sheena Easton	No Sound But a Heart	EMI America	V	1987
Electric Light Orchestra Part 2	Electric Light Orchestra Part II (self titled)	Eurostar	V, K, C, A	1990
Electric Light Orchestra Part 2	Honest Men	Disky	V, K, C, A	1990
Electric Light Orchestra Part 2	Part Two: Once Upon a Time		V, K, C, A	1991
Electric Light Orchestra Part 2	Thousand Eyes	Disky	V, K, C, A	1991
Electric Light Orchestra Part 2	Electric Light Orchestra Part Two Performing ELO's Greatest Hits Live Featuring the Moscow Symphony Orchestra	Scotti Bros. Records	V, K, C, A	1992
Electric Light Orchestra Part 2	Moment of Truth	Ultrapop	V, K, C, A	1994
Electric Light Orchestra Part 2	Power of a Million Lights	Mega Records	V, K, C, A	
Electric Light Orchestra Part 2	One Night: Live in Australia	Norske Gram AS, CMC Records (7)	V, K, C, A	1995
Electric Light Orchestra Part 2	In Concert		V, K, C, A	1996
Electric Light Orchestra Part 2	Greatest Hits Live, Vol 2: Encore Collection		V, K, C, A	1998
Electric Light Orchestra Part 2	Gold Collection, Vol. 2		V, K, C, A	2001
Electric Light Orchestra Part 2	Triple Treasures (3 CD comp)	Digimode Entertainment Ltd.	V, K, C, A	2002
Electric Light Orchestra Part 2	Standin' in the Rain, Strange Magic, Once Upon A Time Ausgabedatum		V, K	2005
Electric Light Orchestra Part 2	The Very Best of the Electric Light Orchestra Part II [Deja Vu]		V, K, C, A	2007
Charlie Elgart	Signs of Life	Novus	V	1988
Faster Pussycat	Faster Pussycat	Elektra	V	1987
	Whipped	Elektra	V, A	1992
Suzanne Fellini	Suzanne Fellini	Casablanca	V	1980
Steve Forbert	Steve Forbert	Epic, Nemperor Records	V	1982
The Hit Crew	Drew's Famous Presents Kids TV Themes	Drew's Entertainment/ Universal	C	2016
Ian Hunter	All of the Good Ones Are Taken	Columbia	V	1983
Garland Jeffreys	American Boy & Girl	A&M Records	V	1979
	Matador and More	A&M Records	V	1992
	Ghost Writer/ One Eyed Jack/ American Boy & Girl	Raven Records	V	2011
Ingrid Jensen	At Sea	ArtistShare	E	2005
Billy Joel	An Innocent Man	Columbia	V	1983
	Greatest Hits, Vols. 1–2 (1973–1985)	Columbia	V	1985
The Justice Department	Let John and Yoko Stay in the USA (single)	New Design Records	V	1972
Karen Kamon	Voices	ATCO Records	V	1987
Tom Kimmel	Circle Back Home	Polydor Records	V	1990
KISS	Rock 'n Roll Over	Casablanca	K	1976
	KISS/ Gene Simmons	Casablanca	V, K	1978
	KISS – Best of Solo Albums	Casablanca	V, K	1980
	Gold: 1974 – 1982, Sound + Vision	Mercury	V, K	2004
	Gold		V, K	2005
	The KISS Solo Albums (Solo Box Set)	Lilith	V, K	2006
La Union	Psycofunkster Au Lait	Warner Music Spain S.L.	V	1993
Robert Lamm	In My Head	Mystic Music & Entertainment	V	1999
Martee Lebow	Love's a Liar	Atlantic	V	1987
John Lennon	Double Fantasy (Woman)	Geffen Records	V	1980
	Collection		V	1989
	John Lennon Signature Box	Capitol Records	V	2010
Julian Lennon	Valotte	Charisma, Virgin	V	1984
	The Secret Value of Daydreaming	Atlantic	V	1986
Rob Jungklas	Closer to the Flame	Manhattan Records	V	1986
Tony LeMans	Tony LeMans	Paisley Park, Reprise Records	V	1989
Barry Manilow	Greatest Hits Volume 2	Arista	V	1983
	The Songs 1975 – 1990	Arista	V	1990
	The Complete Collection and Then Some...	Arista	V	1992
	Greatest Hits – The Platinum Collection	Arista	V	1994
Marilyn Martin	Marilyn Martin	Atlantic	V	1986
Meat Loaf	Dead Ringer	Cleveland Int'l Records, Epic	V	1981
	Hits Out of Hell	Cleveland Int'l Records, Epic	V	1984
	Meat Loaf & Friends	Epic	V	1992
	Dead Ringer & Bat Out of Hell	Cleveland Int'l Records, Epic	V	1992
	Bat Out of Hell II: Back into Hell	MCA Records	V	1993
	The Very Best of Meat Loaf	Cleveland Int'l Records, Epic	V	1998
	Dead Ringer/ Midnight at the Lost and Found/ Bat Out of Hell	Epic	V	1999
	Couldn't Have Said it Better	Mercury	V	2003
	Meat Loaf with the Melbourne Symphony Orchestra – Bat Out of Hell Live	Mercury	V	2004
	Bat Out of Hell III: The Monster is Loose	Mercury	V	2006
	Cry Over Me	Mercury	V	2006
	Blind As A Bat	Mercury	V	2006
	Meat Loaf Featuring Marion Raven – It's All Coming Back to Me Now	Mercury	V	2006
	The Essential Meat Loaf	Epic	V	2011
Frankie Miller	Double Trouble	Chrysalis	V	1978
	Dancing in the Rain	Mercury	V	1986
	Double Trouble/ Full House	2000 FruitGum Corp.	V	2004
	...That's Who! The Complete Chrysalis Recordings (1973–1980)	Chrysalis	V	2011
The Monroes	Everything is Forgiven	EMI	V	1987
Ronnie Montrose	Jump on It	Warner Bros.	V	1976
Elliot Murphy	Apres Le Deluge	EMIS, New Rose Records	piano/organ	1985
	American Stories Part 2	Ruta 66 Records	piano/organ	2005
New York Latin All-Stars Presentando Eddie Ganz	Exitos!	Chicago Records II	V	2012
Allan Nicholls	Songs from the Source	Justin Time	V, K, P, E	2006
Rosie O'Donnell	A Rosie Christmas	Columbia	V	1999
Yoko Ono	Walking on Thin Ice	Rykodisc	V	1985
	Onobox	Rykodisc	V	1992
The Orchestra	No Rewind	Art Music	V, C, K	2005
	The Orchestra Live		V, C, K	2008
	Anthology – 20 Years and Counting		V, C, K	2009
Donny Osmond	Eyes Don't Lie	Capitol Records	V	1990
Pandora's Box	Original Sin	Virgin	V, A	1989
Graham Parker	Another Grey Area	Arista	V	1982
	Passion Is No Ordinary Word		V	1991
	Passion Is No Ordinary Word: The Graham Parker Anthology 1976–1991	Rhino Records, BMG Direct Marketing	V	1993
	Ultimate Collection		V	2001
The Producers	Coelancanth	One Way Records	V	1988
Eddie Rabbit	Rabbit Trax	RCA	V	1986
Lou Reed	New Sensations	RCA	V	1984
	Between Thought and Expression: The Lou Reed Anthology	BMG, RCA	V	1992
	The RCA & Arista Album Collection	Sony Music, Legacy	V	2016
Kevin Rowland	The Wanderer	Mercury, Phonogram	V	1988
Eddie Schwartz	Schwartz	A&M Records	V	1980
Scritti Politti	Cupid & Psyche '85	Virgin	V	1985
	Provision	Virgin	V, A	1988
	First Boy in This Town	Virgin	V, A	1988
	Oh Patti (Don't Fell Sorry For Loverboy)- (Scritti Politti + Miles Davis)	Virgin	V	1988
	Absolute: The Best of Scritti Politti	Virgin	V	2011
Sheila Easton	Little Darlin'	Carrere	C, A	1981
Gene Simmons	Gene Simmons	Casablanca	V, K	1978
Carly Simon	Spoiled Girl	Epic	V	1985
	Coming Around Again	Arista	V	1987
Sisters of Mercy	Floodland	Merciful Release, WEA, Elektra	V	1987
Rex Smith	Forever, Rex Smith	Columbia	V, K	1980
	Everlasting Love	Columbia	V, K	1981
	Rock and Roll Dream 1976–1983	Hear No Evil Recordings, Cherry Red	V, K	2017
Patty Smyth	Never Enough	Columbia	V	1987
	Patty Smyth Feat. Scandal – Greatest Hits	Columbia, Legacy	V	1998
Special EFX	Just Like Magic	GRP	V	1990
	Peace of the World	GRP	V	1991
	Special EFX Collection	GRP	V	1993
Billy Squier	Signs of Life	Capitol Records	V	1984
	Reach for the Sky: The Anthology	Polydor Records	V	1996
	Emotions in Motion/ Signs of Life	Capitol Records	V	2008
Didi Stewart	Begin Here	Kirshner	V	1982
Barbra Streisand	Emotion	Columbia	V, A	1984
Jim Steinman	Bad For Good	Cleveland Int'l Records, Epic	V	1981
James Taylor	That's Why I'm Here	Columbia	V	1985
	New Moon Shine/ Never Die Young/ That's Why I'm Here	Sony	V	2000
	Collection	Sony	V	2009
	The Collection: That's Why I'm Here/ Never Die Young/ JT	Sony	V	2009
Tease	Tease	RCA	C, A	1986
Bonnie Tyler	Faster Than the Speed of Night	U7	V	1983
	Holding Out for a Hero	CBS/Sony	V, A	1984
	Secret Dreams and Forbidden Fire	Epic	V, A	1986
	Free Spirit	EastWest Records, Atlantic	V	1995
	Faster Than the Speed of Night/ Secret Dreams & Forbidden Fire	Sony BMG	V	2007
Various	Lost in the Stars – The Music of Kurt Weill	A&M Records	V	1985
Various	Music and Songs From Starlight Express	MCA Records	V	1987
Various	Peter's Pop Show	Ariola	V, K, C, A	1991
Various	Precious Rock (The Greatest Rock Performances)	Temple	V, K, C, A	1995
Various	Songs From Whistle Down the Wind	Polydor, Really Useful Records	V	1998
Roseanna Vitro	Reaching for the Moon	CMG	V	1991
Wicked Lester (pre-KISS, w/ Gene Simmons & Paul Stanley)	Wicked Lester	Epic	V	never released
Johnny Winter	John Dawson Winter the 3	Blue Sky	V	1974
Akiko Yano	Oui Oui	Sony Music Direct	V	1997
Zebra	Zebra	Atlantic	K	1983

Solo Albums
NAME	ALBUM	LABEL	YEAR
Eric Troyer	String of Pearls (unreleased)	Chrysalis	1980
	Mirage / Meet Me at Midnight (single)	Chrysalis	1980
	Model Citizen	Fine Arts Media	1993
	Eric Troyer & Hagley R.C. High School – Perpetual (single) (Birmingham, England HS fundraiser for school bus crash victims)		1994

Original Motion Picture & TV Soundtracks
NAME	YEAR
Flashdance (Movie) (Universal Music)	1983
Footloose (Movie) (Columbia Records)	1984
Streets of Fire (Movie) (MCA Records)	1984
Night Visitor (Movie) (United Artists)	1989
The Shadow (Movie) (Arista Records)	1994
The Charlie Horse Music Pizza (Starring Shari Lewis & Lamb Chop) (TV – end credit theme song)	1998–1999
Chicago (Movie) (Epic)	2002
Popstar (Movie)	2005
Miracle Dogs Too (Movie)	2006
Moldy (Movie – documentary)	2015
No Rewind: History of the Band, Story of the Album (The Orchestra) (Movie – performance documentary)	2021
Just Up Ahead (TV)	2021–

Movie/TV Appearances
NAME	YEAR
Dead Ringer (Meatloaf) (Movie)	1981
The Charlie Horse Music Pizza (Starring Shari Lewis & Lamb Chop) (TV) – Episode 7: "A Pirates Life"	1998
Electric Light Orchestra Part II – Access All Areas (Movie – performance documentary)	2000
Electric Light Orchestra Part 2 – Access All Areas Live in Australia (Movie – performance documentary)	2003
Live in Reno (The Orchestra) (Movie – performance documentary)	2006
Cry Over Me – Meatloaf	2007
No Rewind: History of the Band, Story of the Album (The Orchestra) (Movie – performance documentary)	2021
Just Up Ahead (TV)	2021–
