= Broken Toy Shop =

Studio album by E
- Released: December 7, 1993
- Recorded: January–October 1993
- Studio: Sunset Sound Factory (Hollywood)
- Genre: Pop rock
- Length: 46:40
- Label: Polydor
- Producer: E; Mark Goldenberg; Parthenon Huxley; Michael Koppelman

E chronology
A Man Called E (1992)	Broken Toy Shop (1993)	Beautiful Freak (1996)

Professional ratings
Review scores
Source	Rating
AllMusic	3/5 stars
Trouser Press	mixed

Broken Toy Shop is the second album by American singer-songwriter E (a.k.a. Mark Oliver Everett), released in December 1993 by Polydor Records. It was his last record as a solo artist before forming the band Eels.

== Reception ==
Stephen Thomas Erlewine of Allmusic gave the album three stars, finding it to be "more of the same highly crafted pop-rock that graced his debut; although the overall quality of songs is just a notch lower than his first album, Broken Toy Shop nevertheless features many delightful pop gems." Michael Zwirn of Trouser Press also found it to be inferior to its predecessor, feeling the album "is longer, but less memorable overall, although “The Only Thing I Care About” and “Shine It All On” are finger-snappable pop hits that weren't."

== Track listing ==
All songs written by E, except where noted.

1. "Shine It All On" (E, Parthenon Huxley) – 4:04
2. "Standing at the Gate" – 3:31
3. "The Only Thing I Care About" (E, Huxley) – 2:40
4. "Manchester Girl" – 3:21
5. "L.A. River" (Jennifer Condos, E) – 2:28
6. "A Most Unpleasant Man" – 3:18
7. "Mass" (Sean Coleman, E) – 3:38
  (includes unlisted track "Hello Are You There?")
8. "Tomorrow I'll Be Nine" – 2:52
9. "The Day I Wrote You Off" – 3:30
10. "Someone to Break the Spell" (Anderson, Condos, E, Susanna Hoffs) – 2:51
11. "She Loves a Puppet" (Condos, E) – 2:46
12. "My Old Raincoat" (E, Huxley) – 3:57
13. "Permanent Broken Heart" – 3:28
14. "Eight Lives Left" – 2:52

== Personnel ==
- E – vocals, piano (tracks 1, 4, 6, 9), screaming (1), Hammond B-3 organ (1–3, 6, 8, 9, 14), keyboards (1–3, 6, 9, 12, 13), percussion (1, 8), electric guitar (2, 4, 9, 13, 14), drums (2, 3, 5, 6, 12, 13), glockenspiel (3, 4), tambourine (3, 5, 6, 8–10, 12), melodica (4, 6, 7a), Fender Rhodes (4), Bit One (4), whistle (5), congas (5), slingshot (5), sleigh bells (5), fingersnaps (5), guitar (7b), baby (7b), lead guitar (8), acoustic guitar (14), harmonica (14), accordion (14), celeste (14)

Additional musicians

- Parthenon Huxley – electric guitar (1, 3, 9, 12), acoustic guitar (1, 3, 12), keyboards (1), background vocals (3), rhythm guitar (9), bass guitar (12), Hammond B-3 (12)
- Paul Martinez – bass guitar (1)
- Winston Watson – drums (1, 8–10)
- Patrick Warren – Chamberlin (1, 5, 7a, 10, 14), keyboards (1)
- Chris Solberg – bass guitar (3, 5–7a, 8, 9, 14), organ hi note (3, 8), acoustic guitar (5), electric guitar (5), Hammond B-3 (5, 10), piano (5), fingersnaps (5), glockenspiel (8)
- Michael Koppelman – fingersnaps (5), acoustic guitar (14)
- Sean Coleman – acoustic guitar (7a), electric guitar (7a), piano (7a)
- Richard Greene – violin (7a)
- Jeff Swartz – trombone (7a)
- Rusty Anderson – acoustic guitar (10), electric guitar (10)
- Jennifer Condos – bass guitar (10, 11), background vocals (11)
- Mark Goldenberg – electric guitars (11), keyboards (11), drums (11), 6 string bass solo (11)

Technical

- E – co-producer, string co-arrangements (2, 6, 12, 13), orchestral co-arranger (9), inlay painting, shoe photo
- Michael Koppelman – co-producer, engineer, mixing; additional recording (1)
- Chris Solberg – assistant producer
- Stephen Marcussen – mastering
- Parthenon Huxley – co-producer (1)
- Mike Fennel – engineer (1)
- Mark Goldenberg – co-producer, engineer, mixing (11)
- Brian Soucy – assistant engineer (11)
- Brandon Harris – assistant engineer (11)
- John Philip Shenale – string co-arranger, co-orchestrator (2, 6, 12, 13)
- Scott Smalley – co-orchestrator (2, 6, 12, 13)
- John Carter – orchestral engineer (2, 6, 12, 13)
- Paul Buckmaster – orchestral arranger, conductor (4); orchestral co-arranger, conductor (9)
- David Schoeber – orchestral engineer (9)
- Marvin Sanders – MIDI
- Mick Haggerty – art direction, design
- Greg Allen – cover photo
- Steve Samiof – cover photo manipulation
- Terri Phillips – back cover photo
- Hugh Everett III – CD photo
