= Jeff Lynne's ELO: Live in Hyde Park =

Video by Jeff Lynne's ELO
- Released: September 11, 2015
- Recorded: September 14, 2014
- Genre: Rock
- Length: 173 minutes
- Labels: Eagle Rock Entertainment, Universal Music Group

Jeff Lynne's ELO chronology
Live: The Early Years (2010)	Jeff Lynne's ELO: Live in Hyde Park (2015)	Wembley or Bust (2017)

Jeff Lynne's ELO: Live in Hyde Park is a concert film by Jeff Lynne's ELO.

On 14 September 2014, Jeff Lynne's ELO, accompanied by the BBC Concert Orchestra and backed by the Take That/Gary Barlow band, headlined BBC Radio 2s Festival In A Day at Hyde Park, London. The show was the first time in almost 30 years that ELO had performed on a festival stage. 50,000 tickets for the event sold out in just under 15 minutes. The release includes interviews from the performance along with the documentary Mr. Blue Sky - The Story Of Jeff Lynne and ELO.

== US and Canadian versions ==
The U.S. and Canadian versions, released by the company Eagle Rock Entertainment, omit the final song "Roll Over Beethoven" which was included on the UK release.

== Full concert songs ==
1. "All Over the World"
2. "Evil Woman"
3. "Ma-Ma-Ma Belle"
4. "Showdown"
5. "Livin' Thing"
6. "Strange Magic"
7. "10538 Overture"
8. "Can't Get It Out of My Head"
9. "Sweet Talkin' Woman"
10. "Turn to Stone"
11. "Steppin' Out"
12. "Handle with Care"
13. "Don't Bring Me Down"
14. "Rock 'n' Roll Is King"
15. "Telephone Line"
16. "Mr. Blue Sky"
17. "Roll Over Beethoven" (not included on US or Canadian version)

== Personnel ==
ELO

- Jeff Lynne – lead vocals, guitars
- Richard Tandy – keyboards, synthesisers, backing vocals

Backing musicians

- Chereene Allen – violin
- Marcus Byrne – keyboards
- Donavan Hepburn – drums
- Iain Hornal – backing vocals, guitar
- Melanie Lewis-McDonald – backing vocals
- Danny Marsden – trumpet
- Milton McDonald – guitar, vocals
- Lee Pomeroy – bass guitar
- Bernie Smith – keyboards
- Mike Stevens – guitar, vocals
- Mick Wilson – percussion, vocals

== Certifications ==
Region	Certification	Certified units/sales
United Kingdom (BPI)	Gold	25,000^{*}
^{*} Sales figures based on certification alone.
