= Honest Men =

1991 single by ELO Part II

Single by ELO Part II

from the album Electric Light Orchestra Part Two
- B-side: "Love For Sale"
- Released: 15 April 1991
- Genre: Rock
- Length: 4:25 (remix); 6:13 (full version)
- Label: Telstar, Disky
- Songwriter: Eric Troyer
- Producer: Jeff Glixman

ELO Part II singles chronology
| "Honest Men" (1991) | "For the Love of a Woman" (1991) |

Music video
- "Honest Men" on YouTube

"Honest Men" is the debut single by ELO Part II. It is the second track on their self-titled debut album. It peaked at No. 36 on the Dutch Single Top 100 and at No. 60 on the UK Singles Chart.

== Overview ==
A music video of "Honest Men" was first aired in June 1991.

Music & Media noted "Honest Men" as sounding very similar to ELO Part II's predecessor Electric Light Orchestra. In his review of the album, Doug Stone of AllMusic said, "…'Honest Men', 'Every Night', and 'Heart of Hearts' imitate the band's glory daze to the point of enjoyability".

The inspiration was that there’s too much corruption and dishonesty in our public figures … even the honest ones still bend the rules …

— Eric Troyer

The single's B-side, "Love For Sale", was a song written by Bev Bevan and Pete Haycock. "Love For Sale" only appeared as a B-side to "Honest Men" and thus did not appear on the album.

== Track listing ==
CD

1. "Honest Men" (remix) – 4:25
2. "Love For Sale" – 4:14
3. "Honest Men" (full version) – 6:13

12" Vinyl

1. "Honest Men" (full version) – 6:13
2. "Love For Sale" – 4:14
3. "Honest Men" (remix) – 4:25

7" Vinyl, Cassette

1. "Honest Men" (remix) – 4:25
2. "Love For Sale" – 4:14

== Personnel ==
Personnel list according to the inner sleeve.

ELO Part II

- Bev Bevan – drums, percussion, backing vocals
- Pete Haycock – guitars, bass, backing vocals
- Eric Troyer – keyboards, lead and backing vocals
- Neil Lockwood – backing vocals

Additional Personnel

- Jeff Glixman - producer
- Don Arden - executive producer
- Louis Clark - string arrangement
- Ron McPherson - art and design

== Charts ==
| Chart (1991) | Peak position |
|---|---|
| Canada (RPM) | 73 |
| Canada AC (RPM) | 33 |
| Netherlands (Single Top 100) | 36 |
| UK Singles (OCC) | 60 |
| UK Airplay (Music Week) | 53 |
