= A Man Called E =

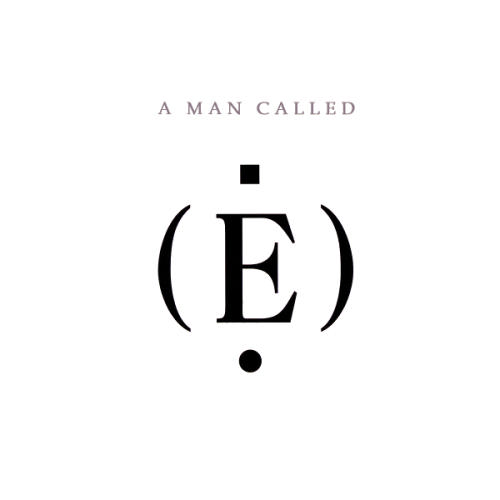

Studio album by E
- Released: February 2, 1992
- Recorded: May–June 1991
- Studios: Knobworld, Roman Foods, The Bakery (southern California)
- Genres: Pop; pop rock
- Length: 32:07
- Label: Polydor
- Producers: E; Parthenon Huxley

E chronology
A Man Called E (1992)	Broken Toy Shop (1993)

Singles from A Man Called E
- 1. "Hello Cruel World" Released: 1992; 2. "Nowheresville" Released: March 1992

A Man Called E is Mark Oliver Everett's 1992 major-label debut album, and the first on which he used the pseudonym "E". (As Mark Everett, he had previously self-released the limited edition LP Bad Dude in Love in 1985.)

"Hello Cruel World" was released as a one-track single in 1992. "Nowheresville"/"Strawberry Blonde" was released in March of that year.

== Background ==
In 1987, Everett moved from his family home in Virginia and resettled in California. There, in 1991, he signed a contract with Polydor Records and released A Man Called E under the name E a year later. The single "Hello Cruel World" was a minor success. Touring to support the album, E opened for Tori Amos.

Everett became known as "E" because there were several people in his life at the time who had the same first name. While it may have caused some confusion in record stores and radio stations, the single-letter name gave the press a playful handle. This playfulness was evident in a review of the album by the eminent writer Daniel Levitin which began: "Excellent eponymous effort, energizingly eclectic. Early enthusiasm effectively ensures E's eminence."

Everett released one further solo album, 1993's Broken Toy Shop, before forming the band Eels in 1995.

== Critical reception ==
Professional ratings
Review scores
Source	Rating
AllMusic	4.5/5 stars

Michael Zwirn, in Trouser Press, wrote that "the production is uncluttered, [E's] singing is unforced and the tunes are eminently hummable, with a sense of cockeyed humor and periodic wistful optimism that is noteworthy in the later context of the Eels' pronounced bitterness."

MacKenzie Wilson of Allmusic praised Everett's talent and said the album was filled with "heavenly pop music", noting it containing "typical quirky melodies and mind-boggling lyrics, but E hits upon lush harmonies similar to the likes of Elton John, the Beach Boys, and Paul McCartney." concluding, "He's thoughtful and almost touching. He's real. Now that's pretty refreshing."

== Track listing ==
All songs written by E, except where noted

1. "Hello Cruel World" (E, Parthenon Huxley) – 3:50
2. "Fitting In with the Misfits" – 3:09
3. "Are You & Me Gonna Happen" – 3:00
4. "Looking Out the Window with a Blue Hat On" – 2:17
5. "Nowheresville" (E, Huxley) – 3:21
6. "Symphony for Toy Piano in G Minor" – 0:34
7. "Mockingbird Franklin" – 3:03
8. "I've Been Kicked Around" – 3:24
9. "Pray" – 2:46
10. "E's Tune" – 2:53
11. "You'll Be the Scarecrow" – 3:21

== Personnel ==
- E – lead & background vocals, electric & acoustic guitars, piano, Hammond B-3, keyboards, harmonica, accordion, drums, percussion, melodica, toy piano, programming

Additional musicians

- Parthenon Huxley – acoustic & electric guitars, bass guitar, percussion, fingersnaps, programming
- Jennifer Condos – bass guitar
- Jim Lang – accordion, Hammond B-3, piano, keyboards, cuckoo clock, programming
- Eric Williams – mandolin ("Nowheresville")
- Danny Davis Jr. – electric guitar ("Are You & Me Gonna Happen")
- Rockenspiel – glockenspiel

Production

- Parthenon Huxley – co-producer
- E – co-producer
- Jim Lang – conductor (The Knobworld Symphony Orchestra), engineer, mixing
- Bill Gable – additional engineer
- Mikal Reid – additional engineer
- Fen – additional engineer
- Jesse Kanner – additional engineer
- Opie – additional engineer
- Stephen Marcussen – mastering
- David Lau – artwork
- Rick Dobbis – design
- Bradford Walker Evans Hitz – photography
- Thomas Nelson – photography
- Lex – pin design
