= Dangerous Moments =

Studio album by Martin Briley
- Released: 1985
- Recorded: May–August 1984
- Studios: The Hit Factory (New York City); Clinton (New York City)
- Genre: Pop rock
- Label: Mercury
- Producer: Phil Ramone

Martin Briley chronology
One Night with a Stranger (1983)	Dangerous Moments (1985)	It Comes in Waves (2006)

Dangerous Moments is the third album by the English rock musician Martin Briley, released in 1985 by Mercury Records. The album art (an up-perspective shot of Briley juxtaposed against an inverted cityscape) was nominated for a Grammy Award. The album was produced by Phil Ramone.

== Critical reception ==
Professional ratings
Review scores
Source	Rating
AllMusic	2/5 stars
The Philadelphia Inquirer	2/4 stars

The Philadelphia Inquirer panned the "humorless rock songs", but wrote that "Briley's vocals are OK in a wimpy Phil Collins-ish sort of way". Other contemporary reviews described Dangerous Moments as a commercial‑minded effort that failed to replicate the success of Briley's earlier hit "Salt in My Tears", characterizing it as more conventional pop‑rock than innovative.

== Track listing ==
All songs written by Martin Briley, except where noted.

Side one

1. "Dangerous Moments" – 4:03
2. "Think of Me" (Briley, Nick Gilder) – 3:46
3. "Ghosts" – 4:26
4. "It Shouldn't Have to Hurt That Much" (Briley, Peter Wood) – 4:25
5. "Alone at Last" – 3:43

Side two

1. "Before the Party Ends" – 3:06
2. "If This Is What It Means" (Briley, Rob Fahey) – 3:20
3. "Dirty Windows" – 4:46
4. "School for Dogs" – 3:05
5. "Underwater" – 3:55

== Personnel ==
Musicians

- Martin Briley – lead and backing vocals, guitar, synthesizers, percussion
- Steve Holley – drums
- Anton Fig – drums
- Frank Vilardi – drums
- Carmine Rojas – bass guitar
- G. E. Smith – guitars
- Dennis Herring – guitars
- Peter Wood – synthesizers, piano
- David Lebolt – synthesizers, piano
- Ralph MacDonald – percussion
- Anthony MacDonald – percussion
- Eric Troyer – backing vocals
- Rory Dodd – backing vocals
- Ellen Foley – backing vocals
- David Lasley – backing vocals
- David Grahame – backing vocals

Technical

- Phil Ramone – producer
- Michael Barry – engineer
- Ed Rak – engineer
- Bobby Cohen – engineer
- Peter Hefter – assistant engineer
- Michael Allaire – assistant engineer
- Michael Abbott – assistant engineer
- Billy Straus – assistant engineer
- Jim Boyer – mixing
- Joseph D'Ambrosio – production coordinator
- Kathryn Radcliffe – production coordinator
- Ted Jensen – mastering
- Murry Whiteman – art direction, cover concept
- Bill Lewy – art direction
- Stan Watts – art direction, cover concept, illustration
- Martin Briley – cover concept
- Lumel & Whiteman Studio – design
- Waring Abbott – photography
