= Fear of the Unknown =

Studio album by Martin Briley
- Released: August 1981
- Recorded: July–August 1981
- Studio: Howard Schwartz Recording (New York City)
- Genre: Pop rock
- Label: Mercury
- Producer: Allan Blazek, Martin Briley

Martin Briley chronology
Fear of the Unknown (1981)	One Night with a Stranger (1983)

Singles from Fear of the Unknown
- 1. "I Don't Feel Better" Released: 1981; 2. "The Man I Feel" Released: 1981; 3. "Slipping Away" Released: October 1981

Fear of the Unknown is the debut solo album by the English rock musician Martin Briley, released in 1981 by Mercury Records.

Although most of the album features the same brand of pop that Briley would play throughout his solo career, the title track is a final salute to Briley's progressive rock background, featuring menacing distorted vocals and paranoiac violin riffs reminiscent of King Crimson. Fear of the Unknown is more self-contained than most of Briley's solo albums, being the only one on which he played all the guitars himself, and the only one which he co-produced.

The cover artwork was painted by Norman Walker. Briley, having studied graphic design, had a lot of input on the artwork and wanted the album to have a photo-realistic cover.

== Track listing ==
All songs written and arranged by Martin Briley.

Side one

1. "Slipping Away" – 3:22
2. "The Man I Feel" – 4:02
3. "I Feel Like a Milkshake" – 3:53
4. "First to Know" – 3:06
5. "Heart of Life" – 5:00

Side two

1. "A Little Knowledge Is a Dangerous Thing" – 3:12
2. "I Don't Feel Better" – 3:12
3. "More of the Same" – 2:56
4. "One Step Behind" – 5:49
5. "Fear of the Unknown" – 3:57

== Personnel ==
Musicians

- Martin Briley – lead and backing vocals, guitars, bass guitar, percussion
- Eric Parker – drums
- Tommy Mandel – synthesizers
- Graham Preskett – piano, violin
- Robert Brissette – bass guitar, backing vocals
- Eric Troyer – backing vocals

Technical

- Allan Blazek – engineer
- Richard Brownstein – assistant engineer
- Ted Jensen – mastering
- Norman Walker – illustrations
- Waring Abbott – photography
- Bill Lewy – cover concept
- Bob Heimall – design
