= Phil Bates =

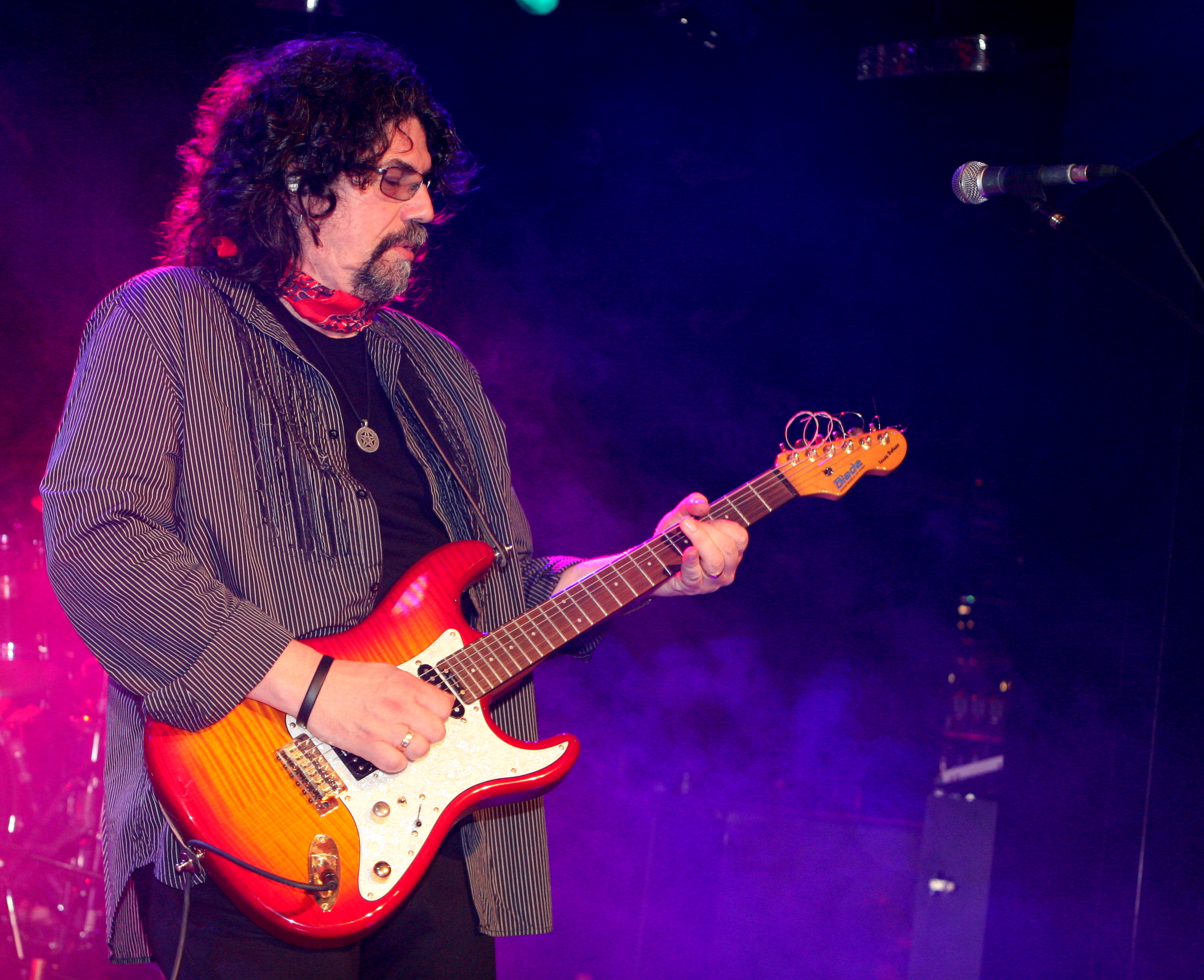

Background information
- Born: Philip Bates; 30 March 1953 (age 72); Tamworth, Staffordshire
- Genres: Rock, Pop, Blues
- Occupation: Musician
- Instruments: Vocals; guitar; bass

Philip Bates (born 30 March 1953) is an English musician who has been a member of many notable bands, including Trickster and Quill, and was the lead guitarist, songwriter, and joint lead vocalist for ELO Part II from 1993 through to 1999 and then its successor band The Orchestra from 2007 to 2011, both times being replaced by Parthenon Huxley.

He was also briefly the singer and guitarist for a reunited Move, from 2004 to 2007, under the leadership of ELO and ELO Part II drummer Bev Bevan.

== Biography ==
Bates was born in Tamworth, Staffordshire, England. At the age of twelve he formed his first band, The Wild Four, which was soon renamed The Teenbeats. Bates moved away from his home town in 1970, living in Handsworth, Birmingham, and working in Birmingham music store Ringway Music (which was owned by jazz musicians Ken Ingarfield, Lionel Rubin, and George Watts).

== Early bands ==
In 1970, Bates joined Wolverhampton heavy-rock band JUG, playing several stints at Glasgow's infamous Electric Garden on Sauchiehall Street. Next was a complete musical reversal when Bates joined cabaret/folk band Enigma, which was being groomed to challenge the New Seekers, by Morgan Music/Studios in London. Enigma became Quill in 1972, releasing the single 'Spent The Rent' on EMI's Parlophone label. Next was a stint as a solo artist, with a publishing deal with Southern Music, and a single. 'Mr Hand Me Down', released under the name Billy Bates on Spark Records, followed in 1974. In 1976, Bates put out 'Take to the Mountains' under the name Billy Bates Company. During the 1970s, Bates established himself as a session musician on the London recording scene, doing sessions for Billy Ocean and Alvin Stardust, and for producers like Steve Lillywhite, Colin Thurston and Tony Visconti, plus many TV and radio jingles.

== Trickster ==
During a spell as a resident musician in London's Piccadilly at the Piazza restaurant, Bates formed Trickster. Trickster released one single, 'Flyaway', on the United Artists label before signing with Electric Light Orchestra's record label, Jet Records, and being managed by the infamous Don Arden. Several singles and two albums were released by Jet, Find the Lady and Back to Zero. Trickster enjoyed minor chart successes with the singles 'If That's The Way The Feeling Takes You' in the US, and 'I'm Satisfied' in the UK, and featured as support band on ELO's ground-breaking and spectacular 1978 Spaceship world tour. Trickster also appeared as Boston's "Special Guest" during their 1979 tour for Don't Look Back.

== Quill and Don't Panic ==
In 1981, after Trickster left Jet Records, Bates moved back to Birmingham and re-joined Quill (sometimes referred to as "Kwil"), where he met his second wife, Josephine, with whom he later formed the band Don't Panic. After a period writing songs for RCA/Arista Music, Don't Panic spent three years, 1987–1990, playing the hotel circuit in the United Arab Emirates, in Dubai and Abu Dhabi.

== Atlantic ==
Bates resumed solo work, and jingle writing/singing/playing at the Old Smithy Studios, Worcester, where he also became lead singer/songwriter and playing guitar, keyboards and bass with the AOR band Atlantic. Atlantic released one CD, Power. Around the same time, Bates was the featured vocalist on the theme song for The Gladiators TV programme, and featured on several tracks of the accompanying gold-selling album.

== ELO Part II ==
In 1993, Bates met up with old friend Kelly Groucutt, who had been ELO's bassist, resulting in Bates joining ELO Part II, replacing Pete Haycock and Neil Lockwood. ELO Part II took the music of ELO around the world, often playing with symphony orchestras in large venues around the globe. Extensive touring in Australia, New Zealand, Argentina, Brazil, Peru, Chile, US, Canada, Latvia, Lithuania, Russia, Poland, Czechoslovakia, South Africa, UK followed, until 1999, when Bates quit to spend more time with his family, and to study for a degree.

== Solo work and recent career ==
After supporting his studies with all manner of gigs, stints in call centres, and a period as a bookseller in Hay-on-Wye, Bates graduated from the University of Wales in 2003 with a History BA Hons. The solo albums Naked and Agony & Ecstasy were released in 1996 and 1998, plus tours of the UK and Germany with Mik Kaminski. Two further solo albums, Alter Ego (2003) and One Sky (2005), followed. All were released on Bates's own labels, DPP, and latterly Essential Music. A compilation CD Retrospectiv, also on Essential, was released in 2007.

After leaving ELO Part II, Bates became a member of the Eleanor Rigby Experience, along with Andy Bole, Maartin Allcock, Clive Bunker and Tina McBain, who released two CDs and toured extensively in the UK. A short stint with The Bev Bevan Band and Bev Bevan's Move followed (2003/2005), along with the formation in the same year of German-based band ELB (Electric Light Band). In 2007, Bates rejoined his old mates from ELO Part II in The Orchestra (featuring members of ELO and Part II).

In 2008, Bates formed the Beatles, Blues and Blue Violin project (BBBV) with Mik Kaminski and Tina McBain, resulting in a tour, and the 2010 BBBV album.

In 2022 and 2023, Bates gigged extensively with his "Tribute to ELO" throughout Europe as Phil Bates and Band. He has often appeared live on German, Swiss and Polish TV playing ELO songs. He plays guitar and several other instruments on Les Penning's album Belerion, which was released in December 2016.
