= ELO Part II =

English rock/pop band (1989–2000)

- Official ELO Part II logo

Background information
- Origin: Birmingham, England
- Genres: Symphonic rock, Rock, pop
- Years active: 1989–2000
- Labels: Scotti Brothers, Telstar, Volcano, Zomba Label Group, Sony BMG, Curb, Edel Music
- Spinoffs: The Orchestra
- Spinoff of: The Move; Electric Light Orchestra; Climax Blues Band; OrKestra
- Past members: Bev Bevan; Louis Clark; Eric Troyer; Pete Haycock; Neil Lockwood; Mik Kaminski; Kelly Groucutt; Hugh McDowell; Phil Bates; Parthenon Huxley

Electric Light Orchestra (ELO) Part II were a British-American rock band formed in 1989 by Electric Light Orchestra drummer and co-founder Bev Bevan. The band also included former ELO bassist and vocalist Kelly Groucutt, and violinist Mik Kaminski for most of its career, along with conductor Louis Clark, who contributed orchestral arrangements to many of ELO's albums and toured as a guest with the original band in its later years; ELO cellist Hugh McDowell likewise briefly performed with Part II in 1991. Alongside these personnel, Part II rotated through several ELO-unaffiliated frontmen during its lifetime, with singer-songwriter and keyboardist Eric Troyer the only one to retain constant membership.

After Bevan left the band in late 1999, he sold his half of the rights to the Electric Light Orchestra name back to Jeff Lynne, and the band changed its name to The Orchestra.

== History ==
=== Formation ===
In 1988, drummer Bev Bevan approached Jeff Lynne, wanting to record another ELO album. Lynne declined to participate, so Bevan signalled that he intended to continue the band without him. Lynne, however, objected over use of the ELO name, and the final agreement reached between the two resulted in ELO officially disbanding and Bevan forming a new band in 1989 called Electric Light Orchestra Part Two. Another term of the agreement was that Lynne would get a percentage of ELO Part II's record royalties. ELO co-founder Roy Wood was approached about joining the band, but declined. Bevan recruited longtime ELO string conductor and co-arranger Louis Clark into his new band, but not as an initial official member (Clark was never an official member of the original ELO either). The first line-up comprised Bevan, plus three musicians unrelated to ELO: American musician and songwriter Eric Troyer (keyboards, guitar and vocals), English musician and songwriter Pete Haycock (guitar, bass and vocals), formerly of the Climax Blues Band, and Welsh musician Neil Lockwood (guitar, keyboards, bass and vocals). John Payne had also been recruited as a member early on but dropped out, eventually to join Asia in 1991 and songwriter/producer Jim Steinman was briefly involved as well, but this didn't work out after he was unwilling to leave New York to travel to London to work with the band.

=== Debut album ===
ELO Part Two released their first album in 1991: Electric Light Orchestra Part Two. It featured former ELO violinist Mik Kaminski on one track.

The supporting tour featured the band performing live with the 80-piece Moscow Symphony Orchestra (MSO) conducted by Konstantin Krimets, and was well received in the UK. The band chose the MSO so they could have a western band playing with an eastern orchestra. Approximately two-thirds of the songs performed were Jeff Lynne–penned compositions. The tour's set was designed by Tom McPhillips and included the ELO spaceship. The show in ELO's home town of Birmingham on 28 May 1991 was captured in abridged form on video and on the live album Performing ELO's Greatest Hits Live Featuring The Moscow Symphony Orchestra, released the following year. Kaminski, former ELO cellist Hugh McDowell, and former ELO bassist and vocalist Kelly Groucutt were part of the live band, with Groucutt sharing lead and backing vocals with Troyer, Haycock and Lockwood. While performing alongside Part II's founding quartet of members and Louis Clark as part of a single eight-piece unit (now containing five former ELO alumni), Kaminski, McDowell and Groucutt were initially billed as guest artists from a band they had formed called OrKestra, itself a vehicle to exploit their past association with ELO. Groucutt and Kaminski ultimately dissolved the group by 1993 and joined Part II full-time, albeit without McDowell, whose tenure with Part II was resultantly a brief one. ELO Part II and MSO planned to kick off their tour in the USA at Radio City Music Hall. But the tour was cancelled as costs became prohibitive.

The band continued to tour Germany and the UK in 1992 with Louis Clark playing keyboards to emulate the strings of the absent orchestra. By 1993 Haycock and Lockwood had left the band after a reported falling out with the band's manager Don Arden and were replaced by guitarist/vocalist Phil Bates, who had been in the band Trickster, one of the opening acts for ELO's 1978 world tour. The group ended up replacing manager Arden with Chris Lawrence and a world tour was undertaken by ELO Part Two in 1993, including dates in the USA and Eastern Europe.

=== Moment of Truth ===
Now a six-piece band (containing four members or affiliates of the original ELO) with a slightly altered name, Electric Light Orchestra Part II recorded a second studio album, Moment of Truth, which was released in 1994. Despite featuring several tracks contributed by both Groucutt and Clark (the latter in the form of orchestral interludes), the album's songwriting was primarily dominated by Troyer and Bates. The success of the album and the single "One More Tomorrow" were determining factors if the band would re-establish themselves in the US. The album was not a commercial success. The band continued its tour schedule over the following years, sometimes augmenting the core band with a backing orchestra. On these rare occasions they hired local orchestras at each venue to cut down costs. Another live album with the Australian Rock Orchestra was recorded in Sydney, Australia in March 1995 and was released the following year in Germany as a double album One Night Live in Australia , and the year after that in the USA as a single album One Night - Live in Australia. The band later sold the master tapes of this album and it has since been remixed, remastered, and re-released several times under different titles.

In 1997, the band featured as the subject of the documentary Electric Light Orchestra Part II: Access All Areas, featuring interviews with all six contemporary bandmembers, video footage of the previously-mentioned 1995 Sydney show and music videos for two original Part II compositions, Troyer's "All Fall Down" and Bates' "Ain't Necessarily So".

=== Later career and transition to The Orchestra ===
Phil Bates remained with the band until January 1999, following which he departed to pursue his long-held ambition of studying history academically and was replaced by American guitarist and singer-songwriter Parthenon Huxley. Later that year, Huxley co-wrote the song "Over London Skies", based on a set of rough lyrics penned by Bevan. Although the finished song made its live debut shortly afterwards, it would not receive an official release until 2001.

In November 1999 Bevan, having decided to retire upon reaching the age of 55, played his last show with the band at the Sands Hotel in Atlantic City and issued a press release in early 2000 indicating that ELO Part II had split. Due to Bev Bevan selling his rights to the ELO name to Jeff Lynne, the band could not continue under the name ELO Part II.

The remaining members, however, recruited drummer Gordon Townsend and continued as The Orchestra, who continue to tour.

== Personnel ==
=== Members ===
- Bev Bevan – drums, percussion, backing vocals (1989–1999; ELO member 1970–1986)
- Louis Clark – orchestral keyboards, string arranger, conductor (1989–2000; ELO associate 1974–1980, 1983, Non-member touring musician 1981–1982, 1986; died 2021)
- Eric Troyer – keyboards, guitar, vocals (1989–2000)
- Pete Haycock – guitar, vocals (1989–1993; died 2013), bass (1989–1991)
- Neil Lockwood – guitar, keyboards (1991, 1992–1993; died 2025), bass (1991), vocals (1989–1993)
- Mik Kaminski – violin (1991, 1992–2000; ELO member 1973–1979, Non-member touring musician 1982, 1986)
- Kelly Groucutt – bass, vocals (1991, 1992–2000; died 2009; ELO member 1974–1983)
- Hugh McDowell – cello (1991; died 2018; ELO member 1972, 1973–1979)
- Phil Bates – guitar, vocals (1993–1999)
- Parthenon Huxley – guitar, vocals (1999–2000; died 2026)

== Discography ==
ELO Part II discography
- Studio albums: 2
- Live albums: 2
- Compilation albums: 1
- Singles: 6
- Video albums: 3
- Music videos: 3

=== Studio albums ===
Title	Album details	Peak chart positions		
Title	Album details	UK	NLD	SWI
Electric Light Orchestra Part Two	Released: July 1991 (US); May 1991 (UK); Reissued: 28 June 2021 CD; 27 September 2021 LP (Renaissance Records); Label: Telstar (UK); Scotti Bros. Records (US); Formats: CD; cassette; LP; digital download	34	39	22
Moment of Truth	Released: October 1994 (UK); February 1995 (US); Reissued: 24 June 2021 CD; 11 October 2021 2LP (Renaissance Records); Label: Edel Music (UK); Curb Records (US); Formats: cassette; CD; digital download; LP (only on reissue)	—	—	—

=== Compilation albums ===
Title	Album details
Anthology – 20 Years And Counting...with Electric Light Orchestra Part II & The Orchestra (2 CD)	Released: 2009; Reissued: 1 November, 2021 (Renaissance Records); Label: none (self-released)

=== Live albums ===
Title	Album details
Performing ELO's Greatest Hits Live (featuring The Moscow Symphony Orchestra)	Released: 1992 (US); Label: Scotti Bros. Records
One Night – Live in Australia (2 CD)	Released: September 1996 (UK); February 1997 (US); Label: CMC Records

=== Singles ===
Year	Title	Album	Chart positions	
Year	Title	Album	UK	NLD
1991	"Honest Men"	Electric Light Orchestra Part Two	60	36
1991	"Thousand Eyes"	Electric Light Orchestra Part Two	113	–
1991	"For the Love of a Woman"	Electric Light Orchestra Part Two	–	–
1994	"Power of a Million Lights"	Moment of Truth	–	–
1994	"Breakin' Down the Walls"	Moment of Truth	–	–
1996	"One More Tomorrow"	Moment of Truth	–	–

=== Music videos ===
Year	Video	Director	Album
1991	"Honest Men"	Unknown	Electric Light Orchestra Part Two
1994	"Power of a Million Lights"	Paul Spencer	Moment of Truth
1994	"Breakin' Down the Walls"	Unknown	Moment of Truth

=== Videos ===
- Performing ELO's Greatest Hits Live Featuring The Moscow Symphony Orchestra (VHS), (1992)
- Electric Light Orchestra – Part II – One Night Live in Australia '95 (DVD), (1995)
- Access All Areas (DVD/VHS), (1997): Produced and directed by George Reed. Running time 58 minutes. Feature includes interviews with band members, live performances, music videos for "All Fall Down" and "Ain't Necessarily So", and behind-the-scenes footage.
