= The Orchestra (band) =

UK musical group

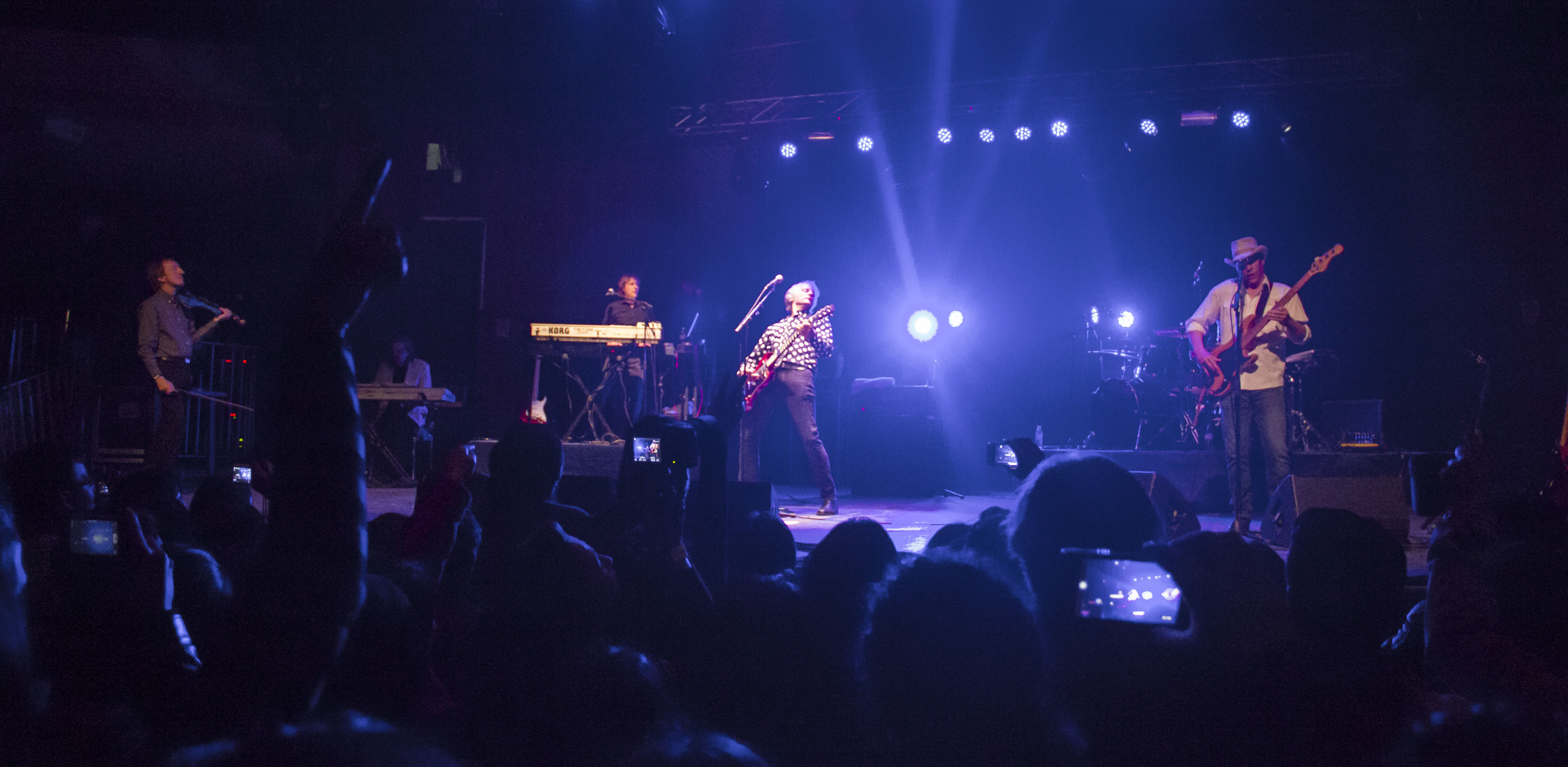
- The Orchestra performing in Chile, 2013

Background information
- Origin: Birmingham, England
- Genres: Rock, pop
- Years active: 2000–present
- Spinoff of: Electric Light Orchestra; ELO Part II; Styx; OrKestra; The Move
- Members: Eric Troyer; Gordon Townsend; Glen Burtnik; Louis Clark Jr. Cliff Hillis; Susan Aquila; David Scott-Morgan
- Past members: Louis Clark; Kelly Groucutt; Phil Bates; Mik Kaminski; Parthenon Huxley; August Zadra
- Website: theorchestraband.com

The Orchestra are a British-American rock band formed in 2000 by former members of the Electric Light Orchestra and ELO Part II. It is the continuation of ELO Part II following Bev Bevan's departure and selling of his share in the rights to the ELO name to Jeff Lynne.

== History ==
=== Formation ===

By 2000, Bev Bevan quit ELO Part II and sold his 50 percent share of the Electric Light Orchestra name as well as the rights to the ELO Part II name to Jeff Lynne. Lynne thereby became the full owner of the ELO name, and took legal action to prevent the band's remaining members - singer and guitarist Parthenon Huxley, singer and keyboardist Eric Troyer and former ELO alumni Mik Kaminski, Louis Clark and Kelly Groucutt - from continuing to call themselves ELO Part II. Replacing Bevan with American drummer Gordon Townsend (a longtime collaborator of Huxley's), the band initially tried to alter their name to ELO2, but they eventually settled on the name "The Orchestra", chosen due to its similarity to OrKestra, the name of the short-lived band Groucutt and Kaminski co-founded in the late 1980s.

=== 2000s and No Rewind ===
In 2001, The Orchestra released a limited number of physical copies of their studio album No Rewind, which was produced and first released without involvement from a major record label. The album's vocals and songwriting were dominated by Eric Troyer and Parthenon Huxley, although several of the band's other members (including the departed Bev Bevan) receive credits as co-writers. With the release of the album, The Orchestra temporarily worked some original material into their live set, with "Jewel & Johnny" and the album's title song becoming occasional staples. Nonetheless, the vast majority of the songs they perform in concert were (and continue to be) covers of Jeff Lynne's compositions that first appeared on ELO's original albums between 1971 and 1986. The band continued to tour throughout the early-mid 2000s, playing shows in Chile, Argentina, the UK, Eastern Europe and elsewhere around the world.

No Rewind was subsequently released in Argentina by Art Music in 2005 and reissued worldwide in 2006. The Orchestra toured the UK extensively in 2006 following the re-issue while being promoted using the descriptive phrase "Electric Light Orchestra Part II Former Members". Lynne sued The Orchestra, claiming trademark infringement. The matter went to litigation and in August 2006, a Los Angeles judge ruled in favour of the members of The Orchestra.

During The Orchestra's 2006 UK tour, guitarist and vocalist Phil Bates, formerly a member of Trickster, Bev Bevan's Move and The Orchestra's predecessor ELO Part II, stood in for Parthenon Huxley at a couple of gigs when Huxley had to return unexpectedly to the States to attend the funeral of his father. In July 2007 Huxley left the band to spend more time with his family and was replaced full-time by Bates, reuniting the lineup of frontmen (Bates, Troyer and Groucutt) that had performed with ELO Part II from 1993 to 1998.

The following year, The Orchestra participated in the Sweden Rock Festival. A short East and Central European tour followed from mid-November taking in Latvia, Lithuania, Czech Republic, Poland and finally Kosice, Slovakia on 1 December 2008.

On 18 February 2009, The Orchestra returned from a sold-out concert in Berlin. A few hours after returning home, however, Kelly Groucutt suffered a severe heart attack and died the following day. Nonetheless, the band (now containing only two ELO alumni) decided to continue performing and hired singer-songwriter and former Styx member Glen Burtnik to supersede Groucutt on bass and vocals (Burtnik had filled in for Groucutt previously during a 1998 ELO Part II tour when the latter had taken ill). On 17 July 2009, this new lineup of The Orchestra opened for the Alan Parsons Live Project at DTE Theater in Clarkston, Michigan. German bassist Ralf Vornberger also played with the band in 2009 in Israel when Burtnik was unavailable due to other work commitments booked before he joined the band.

=== 2010s ===
In November 2011, Phil Bates left The Orchestra. Having already filled in for Bates on multiple occasions earlier in the year, Parthenon Huxley subsequently reclaimed his position as guitarist and vocalist. Contemporaneously, Louis Clark's son, Louis Clark Jr., likewise began to recurrently perform with the band (although he would not become an official member until 2015), typically playing an electric cello to accompany Mik Kaminski's violin. With this revised lineup, The Orchestra ended 2011 with a 17-city tour of Eastern and Central Europe, including stops in Russia, Ukraine, Belarus, Poland, Lithuania and the Czech Republic. In 2013 The Orchestra performed 35 shows around the world including a national telethon for children's healthcare in Ecuador. 2014 saw the band tour extensively across America, performing with the likes of Deep Purple and John Fogerty. The Orchestra also starred on the 2014 Moody Blues Cruise alongside the Moody Blues, Roger Daltrey, the Zombies and other notable acts. The group once again set out on tour in autumn 2015. Due to kidney disease, Louis Clark was forced to absent himself from several U.S. tour dates in 2015, leaving his son to temporarily perform conducting and keyboard duties for the band.

A documentary of their evolution as a band, No Rewind, was filmed at Full Sail University in Winter Park, Florida in 2016, and screened for the first time at the Rivertown Film Festival in Clinton, New Jersey in November, 2017.

Due to Glen Burtnik's commitments to his own band The Weeklings conflicting with The Orchestra's performing schedule, the band (at Gordon Townsend's suggestion) hired Pennsylvania-based singer-songwriter and multi-instrumentalist Cliff Hillis as a part-time substitute for Burtnik's parts in 2018. This arrangement was positively received by the band, enabling Hillis to become a full-time member of The Orchestra several years later. With the passing of Parthenon Huxley in 2026, Hillis has since stepped up into a more prominent role, performing both lead guitar and additional lead vocals.

=== 2020s ===
Louis Clark died in February 2021, having made his final appearance with The Orchestra in March 2020. Upon Clark's passing, Mik Kaminski became the sole remaining member of The Orchestra to have been a member or affiliate of the original ELO (as Clark was technically never a full member of the original band, Kaminski had already been the sole ELO bandmember within The Orchestra's lineup since 2009). Louis Clark Jr. subsequently assumed his late father's roles in the band full-time.

In December 2024, Parthenon Huxley released his memoir, titled "Electric Light Odyssey: My Zigzag Life and the Iconic Band that Changed Everything", which narrates his life, his recruitment into ELO Part II, the transition from "ELO Part II" to "The Orchestra", and dozens of stories from his tenure in both groups.

In August 2025, The Orchestra embarked on "Blue Skies Forever", a two-month tour of the U.S.A. The tour featured guitarist and vocalist August Zadra (a member of Dennis DeYoung's current band) as a substitute for Parthenon Huxley, and violinist Susan Aquila as a substitute for Mik Kaminski. This marked The Orchestra's first extended run of performances to not feature any former members or affiliates of ELO.

After being a part of ELO Part II and The Orchestra for over three decades, Mik Kaminski decided to retire from the band in January 2026, with Susan Aquila claiming her position as official violinist for the band. At the same time, The Orchestra recruited singer-songwriter David Scott-Morgan, who performed live with the original ELO from 1981 to 1986 and provided input into the band's 1983 album Secret Messages, as a guitarist and lead vocalist. Several weeks after Kaminski's retirement, Parthenon Huxley passed away in his sleep following several months of illness, rendering Eric Troyer the sole remaining bandmember to have also been a member of ELO Part II. With Morgan and Aquila, The Orchestra commenced the second leg of the "Blues Skies Forever" tour in March 2026.

== Members ==
=== Current ===
- Eric Troyer – keyboards, vocals, guitar (2000–present) (from ELO Part II)
- Gordon Townsend - drums (2000-present)
- Glen Burtnik – bass guitar, vocals (2009–present) (from one of the 1980s and one of the 1990s lineups of Styx and the non-Broadway cast of Beatlemania)
- Louis Clark Jr. – keyboards, conductor and electric cello (2011–present)
- Cliff Hillis – bass, lead guitar and vocals (2018–present)
- Susan Aquila - violin (2025–present)
- David Scott-Morgan - guitar, vocals (2026-present) (from the final lineup of ELO)

=== Former ===
- Kelly Groucutt – bass guitar, vocals (2000–2009; his death) (from the fifth and sixth lineups of ELO and ELO Part II)
- Phil Bates – guitar, vocals (2007–2011) (from the third lineup of ELO Part II)
- Louis Clark – keyboards, orchestral arranger and conductor (2000–2021; his death) (ELO orchestral arranger and conductor 1974–1983 and keyboards 1981–1986)
- Mik Kaminski – violin (2000–2025) (from the fourth and fifth lineups of ELO and ELO Part II)
- Parthenon Huxley – guitar, vocals (2000–2007 and 2011–2025, died 2026) (from the final lineup of ELO Part II)
- August Zadra – guitar, vocals (2025)

== Discography ==
Studio albums

- No Rewind (2001)

Live albums

- The Orchestra Live (2008)

Videos

- Live in Reno (DVD), (2006)

Compilation albums

- Anthology – 20 Years and Counting... (2009)
- No Rewind: Music from the Documentary Soundtrack (2024)
