= Martin Briley =

British musician (born 1949)

- Born: August 17, 1949 (age 76); London
- Origin: England
- Genres: Guitar, keyboard
- Occupation: Singer-songwriter

Martin Steven Briley (born August 17, 1949) is an English singer-songwriter, guitarist and keyboardist. He was born in London and has recorded with and written for a variety of well-known musicians, as well as releasing several solo albums.

== Music career ==
=== Beginnings and early bands ===
Briley began playing and writing music when he was ten years old. Arthur Brown was his current affirs teacher.

At the age of seventeen, Briley and his band Mandrake Paddle Steamer (later shortened to Mandrake) signed their first record deal with Parlophone/EMI, and subsequently recorded at the legendary Abbey Road Studios. However, the group's published output during their lifetime was limited to two singles, one of which was released only in Sweden.

Briley was later signed to George Martin's Associated Independent Recording (AIR) group of companies and went on to become an important part of the London studio scene as an arranger, vocalist and sought-after session guitarist. He also had a brief stint as bassist/guitarist of the British progressive rock band Greenslade, touring with the group and playing on their 1975 album Time and Tide. During live performances with the group, he played a double-neck combination bass and guitar.

=== Session work in America ===
Briley moved to New York, where he found work as a touring and session musician for numerous artists, including Meat Loaf, Julian Lennon, Bonnie Tyler, the Modern Jazz Quartet, Engelbert Humperdinck, Lulu, Mick Jones, Donna Summer, Cliff Richard, Olivia Newton-John, the Hollies, Tom Jones, Ian Hunter and Albert Hammond.

=== Solo work ===
Briley signed a deal with Mercury Records as a solo artist in the early 1980s, going on to release three albums under his own name. His single "The Salt in My Tears" went into heavy rotation on MTV and reached No. 36 on the Billboard Hot 100 on 30 July 1983, earning him a reputation as a one-hit wonder, as the follow-up single, "Put Your Hands on the Screen", did not crack the Hot 100.

=== Songwriting ===
Briley has received orchestral commissions, and has written songs for such artists as Céline Dion, *NSYNC, Dream, Michael Bolton, Mietta, Kenny Loggins, Pat Benatar, Jessica Andrews, Five Star, Jeff Healey, Rebecca St. James, Nana Mouskouri, Willie Nile, Gregg Allman, Night Ranger, David Hasselhoff, Patrick Swayze, Michael Monroe, Chaz Bono, Peter Tork, Nikki Webster, Hope Partlow, Natascha Sohl, Ballas Hough Band, Phil Stacey, Orianthi, the Maine and Barry Manilow.

== Discography ==
- Fear of the Unknown (1981)
- One Night with a Stranger (1983)
- Dangerous Moments (1984)
- The Mercury Years (2005)
- It Comes in Waves (2006)
- Iceberg Shrinking (2011)
