= One Night with a Stranger =

Studio album by Martin Briley
- Released: 1983
- Recorded: October 1982–January 1983
- Studio: MCA Whitney (Glendale)
- Genre: Power pop, pop rock
- Label: Mercury
- Producer: Peter Coleman

Martin Briley chronology
Fear of the Unknown (1981)	One Night with a Stranger (1983)	Dangerous Moments (1985)

One Night with a Stranger is the second album by the English rock musician Martin Briley, released in 1983 by Mercury Records.

The album peaked at No. 55 on the Billboard 200, after debuting on May 7, 1983. The album featured the hit single "The Salt in My Tears", (No. 36 on the Billboard Hot 100), and the minor follow-up, "Put Your Hands on the Screen", both of which had music videos. The album cover is mostly recreated as the opening shot in the video for "The Salt in My Tears".

== Track listing ==
All songs written and arranged by Martin Briley.

Side one

1. The Salt in My Tears – 3:27
2. Just a Mile Away – 4:06
3. Put Your Hands on the Screen – 4:33
4. Maybe I've Waited Too Long – 4:04
5. She's So Flexible – 3:52

Side two

1. A Rainy Day in New York City – 4:47
2. I Wonder What She Thinks of Me – 3:52
3. Dumb Love – 4:58
4. One Night with a Stranger – 3:42

== Personnel ==
Musicians

- Martin Briley – lead and backing vocals, guitars, Hammond organ, piano
- Jamie Herndon – synthesizers, guitars
- Pat Mastelotto – drums, percussion
- Robin Sylvester – bass guitar
- George Meyer – backing vocals

Technical

- Peter Coleman – producer
- Dave Hernandez – assistant engineer
- Steve Hall – mastering
- Bill Lewy – art direction
- Murry Whiteman – art direction, photography
- Lumel Whiteman Studio – album design
- Stan Watts – illustration
