= Kelly Groucutt =

British bassist (1945–2009)

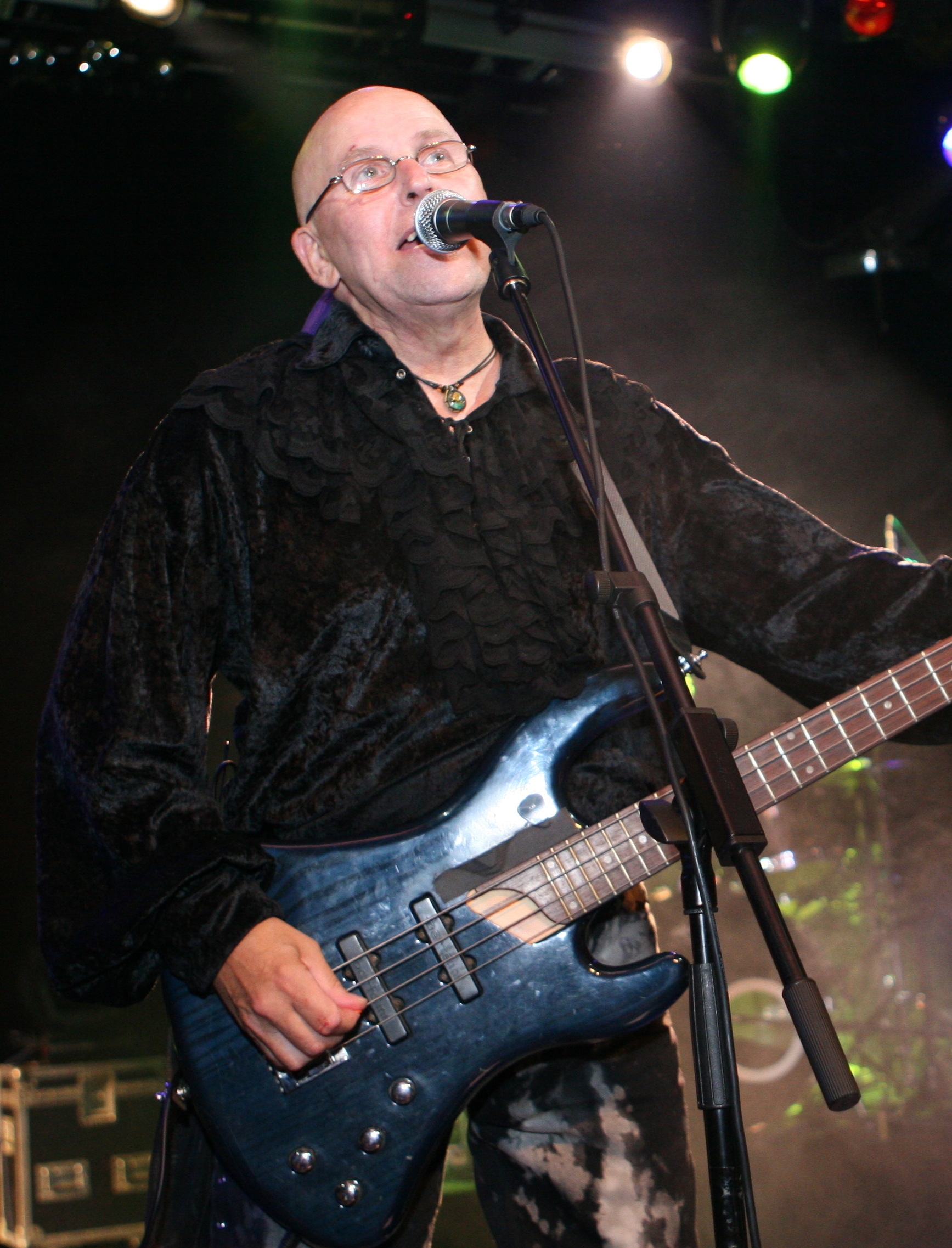
- Kelly Groucutt in 2008

Background information
- Born: Michael William Groucutt; 8 September 1945; Coseley, Staffordshire, England
- Died: 19 February 2009 (aged 63) Worcester, Worcestershire, England
- Genres: Pop, rock, rock and roll
- Occupation: Musician
- Instruments: Bass, vocals
- Years active: 1960–2009
- Labels: Jet, RCA
- Website: www.theorchestra.net, www.kellygroucutt.co.uk

Kelly Groucutt (born Michael William Groucutt; 8 September 1945 – 19 February 2009) was an English musician best known as the bassist and secondary vocalist for the rock band Electric Light Orchestra (ELO) between 1974 and 1982.

== Early career ==
Groucutt was born in Coseley, West Midlands. He began his musical career at 15 as Rikki Storm of Rikki Storm and the Falcons. He sang with multiple outfits during the 1960s, picking up the guitar as he went along. Groucutt was also a member of a band called "Sight and Sound", and later with a band called "Barefoot".

== Electric Light Orchestra ==
While playing with Barefoot in Birmingham, he was spotted by ELO's Jeff Lynne; and after Lynne, Bev Bevan and Richard Tandy had watched him play, he was invited to join ELO, to replace Mike de Albuquerque, who had recently left the band. Upon joining, he was asked to adopt a stage name because ELO had already had several members named Michael, Mike or Mik; he chose Kelly (a school nickname). ELO then set off on their Eldorado tour. The first Electric Light Orchestra album to feature Groucutt on bass guitar and as a backing vocalist was Face the Music (1975). He assumed lead vocal duties on one or two album tracks typically, and his vocals can be heard on later ELO songs, most prominently on songs such as "Nightrider" (1975), "Poker" (1975), "Down Home Town" (1975), "Above the Clouds" (1976), "Across the Border" (1977), "Night in the City" (1977), "Sweet is the Night" (1977) and "The Diary of Horace Wimp" (1979). Groucutt often displayed his operatic vocal talents during live performances of "Rockaria!" (1976), though these were not performed in the studio.

Groucutt continued contributing on the albums A New World Record (1976), Out of the Blue (1977), Discovery (1979), Xanadu (1980), Time (1981), and the early sessions for Secret Messages (1983). By Time, Groucutt's role in the band was reduced by Lynne from co-lead vocals to backing vocals exclusively.

In 1982, he released his self-titled, debut solo album, Kelly. This album featured fellow ELO members Bev Bevan, Richard Tandy, Mik Kaminski and their orchestral co-arranger and conductor Louis Clark. In 2001, the album was remastered for CD.

Groucutt remained with ELO until the onset of the recording sessions for the album Secret Messages in 1982. It was at this juncture that he left the band, unhappy with royalty payments during his tenure, and made the decision to sue management and band leader Jeff Lynne. A settlement for the sum of £300,000 (equivalent to £1,020,000 in 2025) was reached out of court prior to proceedings, but Groucutt later reflected that he regretted suing Lynne. He is credited with playing bass on Secret Messages, although the 2018 album liner notes state that he only played on four songs ("Train of Gold" and "Rock 'n' Roll Is King" from the single disc release and "No Way Out" and "Beatles Forever" from the original double album).

During the mid-to-late 1980s, Groucutt worked further on his solo career, including the We Love Animals EP in 1985 to benefit the RSPCA. One of his songs from the EP, "The Fox", was later reworked for the ELO Part II album Moment of Truth.

Groucutt played a Gibson G3 bass as well as a Fender Precision Bass, an Ovation acoustic guitar and Hofner 500/1 bass guitar during much of his tenure in Electric Light Orchestra.

== OrKestra ==
In the late 1980s, he and former bandmate Mik Kaminski formed the group Player, a name soon revised to OrKestra to avoid confusion with the existing rock band of the same name. Groucutt and Kaminski eventually became dissatisfied with the poor promotion and record label the band received, especially as their first album, Beyond The Dream was delayed. Though at least one song was ready for use in the 1989 film Summer Job, the album itself was not released until 1991. By that point, Kaminski and Groucutt, joined by fellow ELO member Hugh McDowell, had guest starred in a tour with ELO Part II. In 1992, Groucutt and Kaminski dissolved OrKestra and joined ELO Part II full-time.

In 1993, the group's second album, Roll Over Beethoven was released under the OrKestra name. It included more material from Groucutt and Kaminski's tenure in the band.

== ELO Part II and The Orchestra ==
Initially joining Part II as a guest during a 1991 tour (in which he shared lead vocals with Eric Troyer, Peter Haycock and Neil Lockwood), Groucutt eventually became a full-time member of the band in 1992, shortly prior to Lockwood and Haycock's departures. Groucutt would alternate lead vocal duties with Troyer and newly hired guitarist Phil Bates for much of the group's remaining lifespan. When the group released Moment of Truth, Groucutt contributed the song "The Fox", and co-wrote "Blue Violin" and "Twist of the Knife". Groucutt also appeared on the live albums Performing ELO's Greatest Hits Live and One Night - Live in Australia.

While Groucutt was primarily the group's bassist, some live performances feature songs in which he would switch to guitar.

When Bev Bevan sold his half of the rights to ELO back to Jeff Lynne in 1999, Groucutt chose to remain with the group, which was renamed The Orchestra. He again made writing contributions to the group's next album, No Rewind, by co-writing the closing track, "Before We Go", on which he also sang lead vocals.

== Personal life ==
Groucutt was married twice. In 2006, Groucutt wed Anna-Maria Bialaga. They remained married until his death.

== Death ==
On 18 February 2009, Groucutt returned from a sell-out show with The Orchestra in Berlin. He suffered a heart attack shortly after, and died on 19 February at the Worcestershire Royal Hospital in Worcester. His family held a small, exclusive concert with members from The Orchestra in his memory.

After a successful crowdfunding campaign was held by his family, a plaque commemorating Groucutt was placed at his childhood home, where his family lived from 1937 to 1992.
