= Mik Kaminski =

English musician (born 1951)

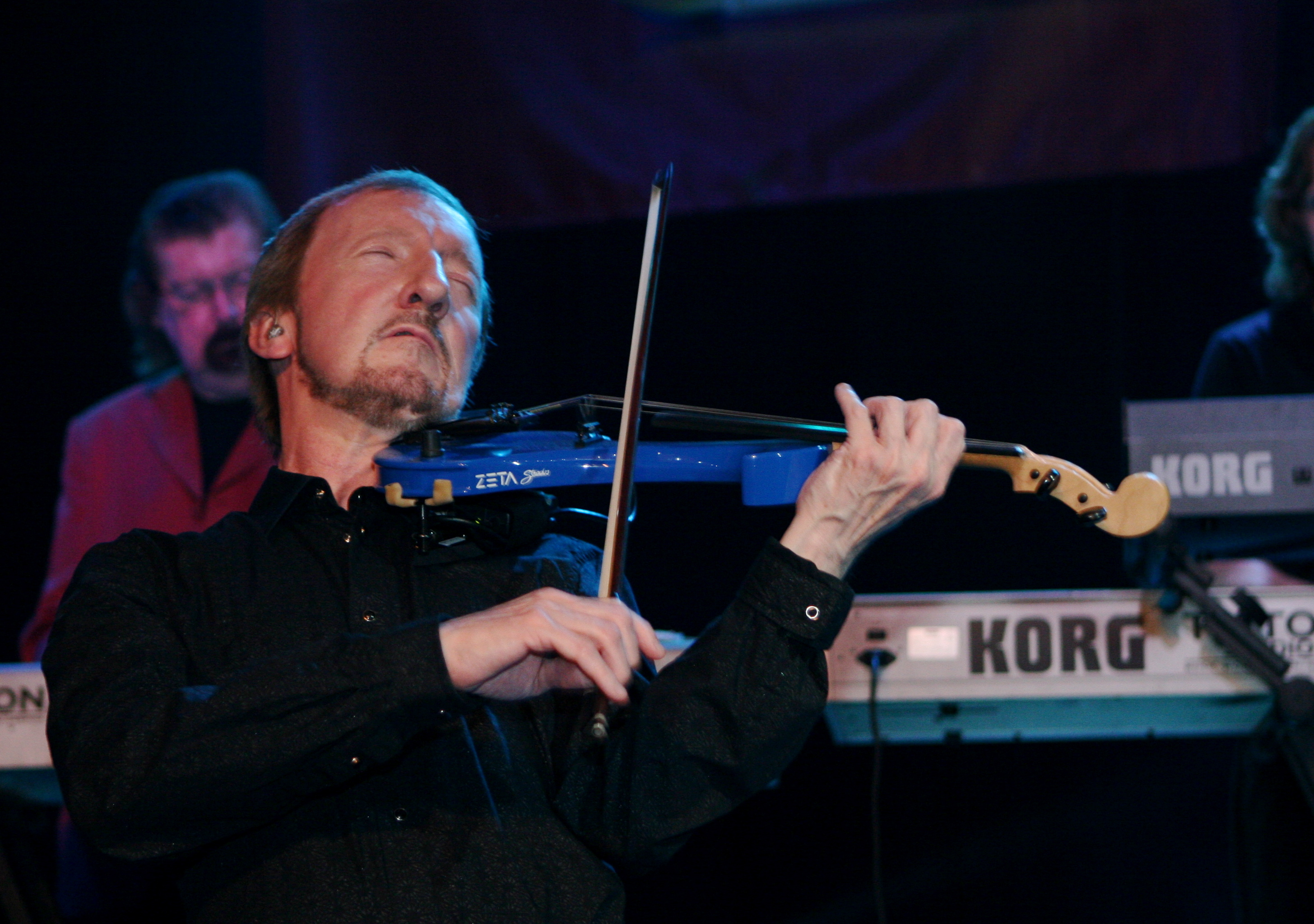
- Kaminski in 2018

Background information
- Born: Michael Kaminski; 2 September 1951 (age 74); Harrogate
- Origin: Harrogate, England
- Genres: Rock, pop, classical
- Occupation: Musician
- Instruments: Violin, viola, keyboards
- Years active: 1965–2026
- Label: Jet
- Website: Musical career

Michael Kaminski (born 2 September 1951) is an English musician. He played violin in the rock band Electric Light Orchestra (ELO) between 1973 and 1980 and toured with the band from 1981 to 1986. He was a member of Electric Light Orchestra Part II from 1991 until its end in 2000, and then The Orchestra from 2000 to 2026.

== Early life ==
Kaminski was born in Harrogate, North Riding of Yorkshire, England. He made his first professional performance with the Leeds Orchestra when he was 14. During his time at the Leeds School of Music, he founded the band Cow, together with his friends John Hodgson, who played drums, and John Marcangelo, who played keyboards and other percussion.

== Career ==
In 1973, he joined Joe Soap and played violin on their Keep It Clean album. Their producer Sandy Roberton suggested Kaminski to Andy Roberts, who needed a violinist for his album. Thus Kaminski played in 1973 on Roberts' Andy Roberts and The Grand Stampede.

After those albums Kaminski applied for the vacant post as ELO's violinist because of an advertisement in Melody Maker. He was recruited after two interviews and was also the only person auditioning who did not play a wrong note. Bandleader Jeff Lynne held the audition. Kaminski first appeared on ELO's 1973 studio album On the Third Day, playing violin on four tracks.

During his stint in ELO, Kaminski initially tried to imitate his predecessor Wilf Gibson by wearing a cape while playing the violin, but soon acquired his trademark blue violin, which he has played variants of ever since. Kaminski's own band is called Blue Violin.

Kaminski was one of the three remaining string players for the group when Lynne decided to remove them in 1980, although Kaminski had not appeared on any of the band's studio recordings since 1977's Out of the Blue by the time of his dismissal. Unlike fellow string players Hugh McDowell and Melvyn Gale, however, Kaminski returned to perform on the tours for the ELO albums Time and Balance of Power, and on the 1983 single "Rock 'n' Roll Is King". Kaminski likewise appeared prominently on ELO bandmember Kelly Groucutt's 1982 solo album. Following ELO's breakup in 1986, Kaminski formed the group Player (later revised to OrKestra) alongside Groucutt; the pair were joined by former ELO cellist Hugh McDowell several years later. Increasingly dissatisfied with the promotional campaign for OrKestra, Kaminski, Groucutt and McDowell accepted an offer to perform in the debut tour for the ELO spinoff band ELO Part II in 1991 (Kaminski had previously appeared as a guest on one track from Part II's debut album). While promoted as guest artists from OrKestra, Kaminski, Groucutt and McDowell performed alongside Part II as a single eight-piece unit during the tour. By 1993, Kaminski and Groucutt dissolved OrKestra and became full-time members of Part II; Kaminski thereby prominently features on the group's second album Moment of Truth, both playing violin on and receiving songwriting credits for several tracks. Kaminski continued to perform with ELO Part II for the remainder of its lifetime.

Upon ELO Part II's rebranding as The Orchestra in 2000, Kaminski chose to remain with the band, contributing violin parts to its sole released studio album No Rewind the following year. Following Louis Clark's death in 2021, Kaminski became the sole member of the Orchestra to have formerly been a member or affiliate of the original ELO, holding the title until his retirement in January 2026.

Apart from the hits he had with ELO, in early 1979 Kaminski made the Top 40 of the UK Singles Chart as the frontman of a one-hit wonder group called Violinski, with the single "Clog Dance". Kaminski sporadically performed "Clog Dance" live with The Orchestra.

Kaminski was featured as violinist on a selection of tracks from the second studio album, Beauty In Chaos, by the Anglo-Irish acoustic duo Fay & Latta.
