= Louis Clark =

English musician (1947–2021)

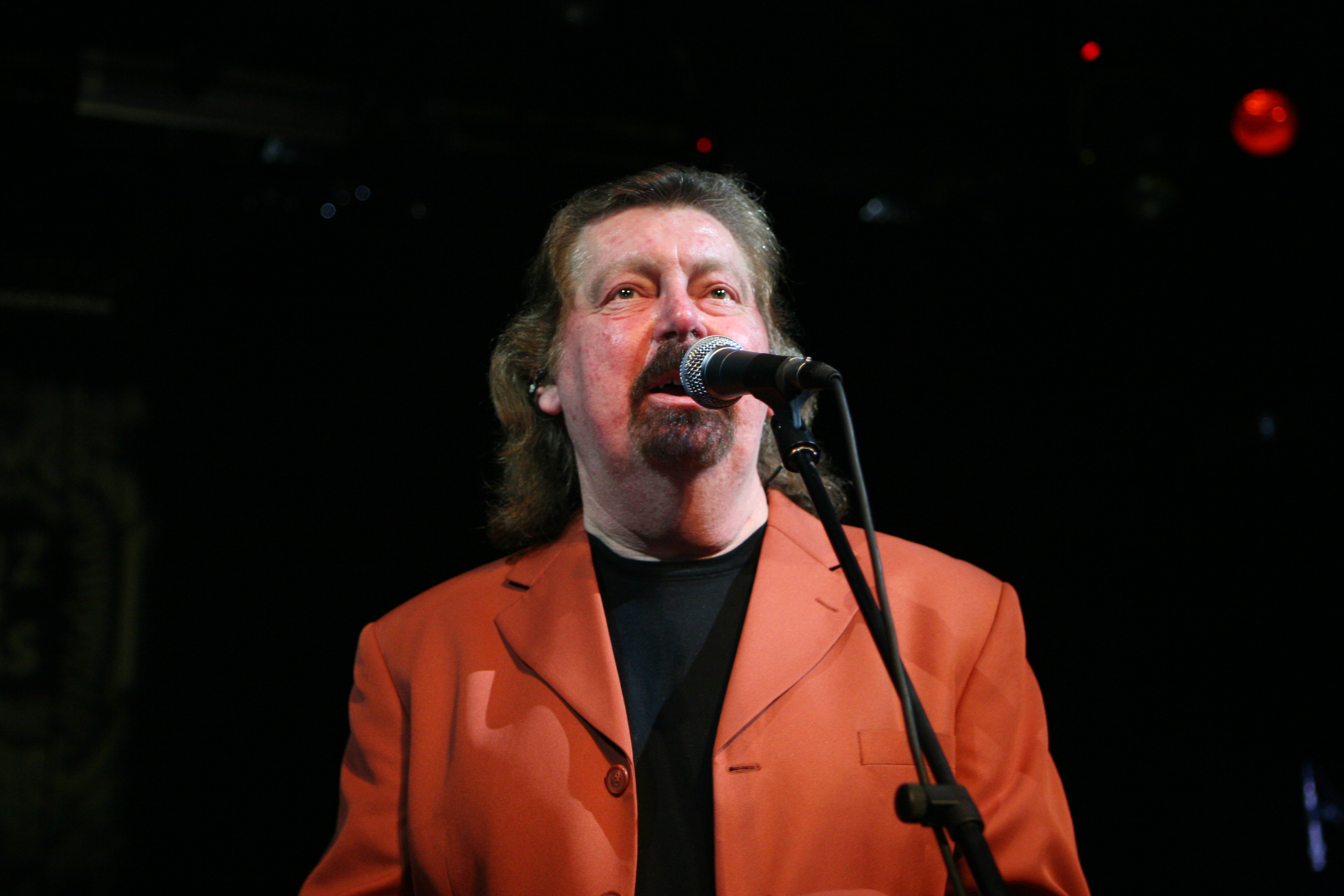
- Clark in 2008

Background information
- Born: 27 February 1947
- Origin: Kempston, Bedfordshire, England
- Died: 13 February 2021 (aged 73) Elyria, Ohio, U.S.
- Occupation: Musician
- Instrument: Keyboards
- Years active: 1974–2021

Louis Clark (27 February 1947 – 13 February 2021) was an English music arranger and keyboard player. He trained at Leeds College of Music. He is best known for his work with Electric Light Orchestra and Hooked on Classics. Clark started out as a bass guitarist for Birmingham band The Buccaneers, who later became Monopoly and eventually The Raymond Froggatt Band.

== Electric Light Orchestra ==
Clark in 2018 at the soundcheck of The Orchestra

Clark was the conductor and arranger of the orchestra and choir hired to back Electric Light Orchestra's sound, introduced on their album Eldorado in 1974. He assisted Jeff Lynne and Richard Tandy in writing the string arrangements for the studio albums Eldorado, Face the Music, A New World Record, Out of the Blue, Discovery and Xanadu. He later played synthesizers for ELO during their Time tour. In 1983 he returned to arranging and conducting the strings on the Secret Messages album, and in 1986 he played keyboards again with the band on their small number of live dates.

Clark was likewise an affiliate of the ELO spinoff band ELO Part II for much of its lifespan, contributing string arrangements to both of the group's studio albums during the 1990s and participating in its live performances as a keyboardist and orchestral conductor. Upon Part II's rebranding as The Orchestra in 2000, Clark (now a full-time member) remained with the group, his involvement continuing until his death in 2021. His son, Louis Clark Jr., continues to perform with The Orchestra into the present day.

== Royal Philharmonic Orchestra ==
In 1977, Clark arranged the music of Renaissance for their Albert Hall concert with the Royal Philharmonic Orchestra (RPO) and two songs on Annie Haslam's debut solo album Annie in Wonderland.

In the early 1980s, he conducted the Royal Philharmonic Orchestra on a series of records under the title Hooked on Classics. In 1985, he again worked with Renaissance singer Annie Haslam and the band's lyricist Betty Thatcher with the RPO to produce the album Still Life. In 1982, he released the album The Royal Philharmonic Orchestra Plays the Queen Collection, recorded by the Solid Rock Foundation. In 1983, he released the album The Royal Philharmonic Orchestra Plays Beatles Collection, recorded by the Solid Rock Foundation, at the 20th Concerto Anniversary of The Beatles, having as guest artists Joan Collins, Elena Duran, Honor Hefferman and Roy Wood.

== English Pops Orchestra ==
In 2011 Louis Clark was made president of the English Pops Orchestra, and returned to performing Hooked on Classics 'LIVE' with the EPO using many of the players that recorded the original albums.

== Library music for television, commercials and radio ==
From the late 70's and through the 80's Clark composed library music for the production company Bruton Music. Some of the music was, and sometimes still is, used for television, TV commercials (Cadbury's Flake, Nescafe) and radio (jingles for LBC). In 1980 he arranged the strings for the songs in the film The Apple, a musical that was critically derided as one of the worst films ever made but has since gained cult status.

== Death ==
Louis Clark died on 13 February 2021 in Elyria, Ohio, fourteen days short from his 74th birthday. His death at the age of 73 was announced by his wife, Gloria, on his Facebook page. No cause of death was revealed, but he had been ill for months and had suffered from kidney issues. In her post announcing his death, his wife Gloria wrote, "He passed very peacefully surrounded by love. This morning he watched Premier League soccer and listened to The Beatles, two things he loved. This afternoon I told him I loved him, he said I love you too, and we kissed. He was gone five minutes later. We love this man forever and always. He was a good man, loved by many and will be greatly missed by all. We want to thank family, friends and fans who have always loved and supported him."

== Other associated acts ==
Besides ELO and its successor bands, Louis Clark worked as an arranger for many other rock and pop artists:

With Roy Orbison

- Mystery Girl (Virgin Records, 1989)

With Ozzy Osbourne

- Diary of a Madman (Jet Records, 1981)
- Bark at the Moon (Epic Records & Columbia Records, 1983)

With Roy Wood

- Starting Up (Legacy Records, 1987)

With Kelly Groucutt

- Kelly (RCA Records, 1982)

With America

- Your Move (Capitol Records, 1983)

With Kiki Dee

- How Much Fun (co-arranged with Richard Tandy)

With Carl Wayne

- Deeper than Love (Jet Records, 1982)
- Midnight Blue (Jet Records, 1982)

With Juan Martin

- Serenade, Love Theme From The Thorn Birds (WEA Records, 1984)

With Asia

- Astra (Geffen Records, 1985)

With Mike Berry

- I'm a Rocker (Scramble Records, 1977)

With Simone

- Flattery (Spiral Records, 1977)

With Annie Haslam

- Annie in Wonderland (Warner Bros. Records, 1977)

With Renaissance

- A Song for All Seasons (1978)
- Live at the Royal Albert Hall (King Biscuit Flower Hour Records, 1997)

With City Boy

- Book Early (Vertigo Records, 1978)
- The Day the Earth Caught Fire (Vertigo Records, 1979)

Among others are UB40, Jon Spencer, Iris Williams and more recently Air Supply.

== Discography ==
Sourced from Louis Clark's official website – all albums performed by the Royal Philharmonic Orchestra unless otherwise stated.

- (per-spek-tiv) n. (Jet 218, 1979)
- Hooked on Classics (K-Tel One 1146, 1981)
- The Queen Collection (EMI TV33, 1982 and MFP 41 5673 1, 1982)
- Hooked on Classics 2: Can't Stop the Classics (K-Tel One 1173, 1983), later releases were subtitled "Can't Stop the Classics"
- Hooked on Classics 3: Journey Through the Classics (K-Tel One 1226, 1983), later releases were subtitled "Journey Through the Classics"
- The Beatles 20th Anniversary Concert (Spartan SRFC1001, 1983)
- Best of Hooked on Classics (K-Tel One 2266, 1984)
- Great Hits from Hooked on Classics (Pickwick SHM3158, 1985)
- Still Life (Spartan LCTV1, 1985) featuring vocals by Annie Haslam and lyrics by Betty Thatcher
- Favourite Classics (Spartan SLCLP2, 1986)
- Hooked on Classics Collection (K-Tel 5107, 1986)
- The Very Best of Hooked on Classics (Pickwick PWKS 4017, 1986)
  - Later release: (K-Tel EMC2006, 1992)
- Abbaphonic (Disky AC202, 1987 and Disky DLP2007, 1987)
  - Later released as Classic Abba (Icon ICONCD002, 1992), The Royal Philharmonic Orchestra Plays Abba (Disky DCD 5246, 1992; Emporio EMPRCD585, 1995; Disky INS 855362, 1999), The Music of ABBA (Hallmark 301372, 1995)
- Beatlephonic (Disky DLP2015, 1987)
  - Later released as The Royal Philharmonic Orchestra plays The Beatles (Disky DCD5255, 1992; Disky INS 855372, 1999)
- Hooked on Rhythm & Classics (Telstar 2344, 1988)
  - Later re-released with an extra track as The Classics in Rhythm (Arista ARCD-8588, 1989), and as Hooked on Rhythm and Classics (Pickwick PWKS 4223, 1994)
- Hooked on Classics: The Ultimate Performance (K-Tel OCE2432, 1989)
- Legends (Union LP1, 1989)
- Seriously Orchestral Hits of Philadelphia Phil Collins (EDL 2555-1, 1990; Virgin RPOMC1, 1991; EDL 2555-2, 1993)
- Hooked on Hooked on Classics (Music Club MCTC003, 1991)
- Hooked on Classics X-tra Collection Vol 1 (ELAP 4718, 1991)
- Hooked on Classics X-tra Collection Vol 2 (ELAP 4719, 1991)
- The Royal Philharmonic Orchestra Plays Queen (Disky DCD 5256, 1992)
- The Two Sides of Louis Clark: Rock Legends and Favourite Classics (Westmore Music CDWM108, 1993)
- Instrumental Classics (K-Tel ECD 3025, 1994)
  - Also released as Hooked on Instrumental Classics (K-Tel 6133-2, 1994), albeit in a different track order and with an extra track.
- The Royal Philharmonic Orchestra Plays Pop Legends (Disky DCD 5381, 1994)
- More Hooked on Classics (Music Club MCCD 369, 1998)

Compilations:

- Open Space: The Classic Chillout Album (Columbia 504690-2, 2001)
- The New Classic Chillout Album: From Dusk Til Dawn (Sony STVCD148, 2002)
