= Atomic Kitten discography =

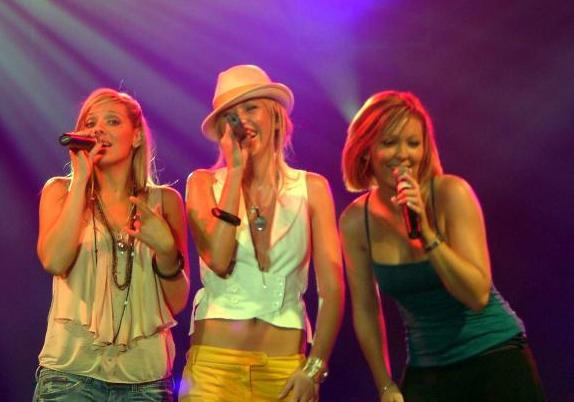
- The second lineup of Atomic Kitten performing in 2005.
- Studio albums: 3
- Compilation albums: 7
- Singles: 21
- Video albums: 4
- Music videos: 20

The discography of British girl group Atomic Kitten consists of three studio albums, seven compilation albums, four video albums, and twenty-one singles (including one single recorded as part of the cast of The Big Reunion). The group's debut album, Right Now – largely written by Atomic Kitten founders and OMD members, Andy McCluskey and Stuart Kershaw – was released by Virgin Records in the United Kingdom in October 2000. It reached number thirty-nine on the UK Albums Chart and spawned four top twenty singles; "Right Now", "See Ya", "I Want Your Love" and "Follow Me". The album's sales did not meet the expectations of the label, and the group were to be dropped. However, the group managed to persuade the label to let them release one more single, "Whole Again", which reached number one on the UK Singles Chart for four weeks and number one in Germany for six weeks. Due to this success, all plans to drop the group were scrapped. The group then released "Eternal Flame", a cover of The Bangles hit, which also reached number one in the UK. Atomic Kitten then re-issued the album Right Now, and it topped the charts in the UK and was certified double Platinum.

Their second album, Feels So Good, peaked at number one in the UK in September 2002 and went double Platinum. The second single from the album, "The Tide Is High (Get the Feeling)", topped the charts in the UK for three weeks. Preceded by the singles "If You Come to Me" and "Be with You", Atomic Kitten's third and final studio album, Ladies Night, peaked at number five in the UK in November 2003. Although it was not as successful as their previous albums, it was still certified Platinum. The singles produced from Ladies Night were also not as successful as their previous releases, although four of them reached the top ten in the UK. The most successful was "If You Come to Me", which peaked at number three. In 2004, Atomic Kitten announced they were going on a hiatus and released a greatest hits album, which peaked at number five in the UK and was certified Gold. Atomic Kitten have released three more singles: "Cradle 2005", which reached number ten in the UK, and the charity singles "All Together Now (Strong Together)" in 2006, which reached number 16 in Germany and "Anyone Who Had a Heart" in 2008, which reached number seventy-seven in the UK. An unofficial compilation album, The Essential Collection, was released on 13 February 2012, but was ineligible to chart. In 2021, McClarnon and Hamilton were rejoined by Frost to record a football themed version of "Whole Again", entitled "Southgate You're the One (Football's Coming Home Again)", which was released by Sony's Columbia Records and charted at number 86 on 9 July 2021 after a few days on sale. It later peaked at number 14 on 16 July

== Albums ==
=== Studio albums ===
List of albums, with selected chart positions and certifications
Title	Album details	Peak chart positions										Certifications
Title	Album details	UK	AUS	AUT	BEL	DEN	GER	IRE	NLD	NZ	SWI	Certifications
Right Now	Released: 16 March 2000; Label: Innocent; Format: CD, cassette	1	86	8	8	4	6	9	44	12	4	BPI: 2× Platinum; BVMI: Gold; IFPI DEN: Gold; IFPI SWI: Gold; RMNZ: Platinum
Feels So Good	Released: 9 September 2002; Label: Innocent; Format: CD, cassette, digital download	1	21	3	12	12	6	5	6	3	7	BPI: 2× Platinum; ARIA: Platinum; BVMI: Gold; IFPI AUT: Gold; IFPI EUR: Platinum; IFPI SWI: Gold; NVPI: Gold; RMNZ: Platinum
Ladies Night	Released: 10 November 2003; Label: Innocent; Formats: CD, cassette, digital download	5	67	10	71	—	12	28	24	3	11	BPI: Platinum; IFPI AUT: Gold; RMNZ: Gold
"—" denotes releases that did not chart or were not released in that territory.

=== Compilation albums ===
List of albums, with selected chart positions and certifications
Title	Album details	Peak chart positions								Certifications
Title	Album details	UK	AUT	BEL	GER	IRE	NLD	NZ	SWI	Certifications
Atomic Kitten	Released: 22 April 2003; Label: Virgin; Formats: CD, digital download	—	—	—	—	—	—	7	—	RMNZ: Gold
The Greatest Hits	Released: 5 April 2004; Label: Virgin; Formats: CD, digital download	5	24	63	35	19	35	8	61	BPI: Gold; RMNZ: Gold
The Collection	Released: 2 May 2005; Label: EMI; Formats: CD, digital download	—	—	—	—	—	—	—	—	BPI: Silver
Access All Areas: Remixed and B-Sides	Released: 30 August 2005; Label: Virgin; Format: CD, digital download	—	—	—	—	—	—	—	—	
Essential	Released: 25 December 2007; Label: EMI; Formats: CD, digital download	—	—	—	—	—	—	—	—	
The Essential Collection	Released: 13 February 2012; Label: Music Club; Formats: CD, digital download	—	—	—	—	—	—	—	—	
Whole Again – The Best of Atomic Kitten	Released: 20 November 2015; Label: Spectrum; Formats: CD, digital download	—	—	—	—	—	—	—	—	
"—" denotes releases that did not chart or were not released in that territory.

=== Video releases ===
List of albums
Title	Album details	Certifications
So Far So Good	Released: 26 November 2001; Label: Virgin; Formats: DVD, VHS	
Right Here, Right Now Live!	Released: 30 September 2002; Label: Virgin; Format: DVD, digital download	BPI: Gold
Be with Us (A Year With...)	Released: 1 December 2003; Label: Virgin; Format: DVD, digital download	BPI: Gold
The Greatest Hits Live at Wembley Arena	Released: 19 April 2004; Label: EMI; Format: DVD, digital download	

== Singles ==
=== As lead artist ===
List of singles, with selected chart positions and certifications
Title	Year	Peak chart positions										Certifications	Album
Title	Year	UK	AUS	AUT	BEL	DEN	GER	IRE	NLD	NZ	SWI	Certifications	Album
"Right Now"	1999	10	72	—	17	—	—	—	—	40	—		Right Now
"See Ya"	2000	6	—	—	63	—	—	50	—	—	—		Right Now
"I Want Your Love"	2000	10	—	—	—	—	—	48	—	—	—		Right Now
"Follow Me"	2000	20	—	—	—	—	—	—	—	—	—		Right Now
"Whole Again"	2001	1	2	1	4	10	1	1	1	1	2	BPI: 2× Platinum; ARIA: 2× Platinum; BEA: Gold; BVMI: Platinum; IFPI AUT: Gold; IFPI SWI: Gold; NVPI: Platinum; RMNZ: 2× Platinum	Right Now (re-release)
"Eternal Flame"	2001	1	46	3	1	12	5	2	6	1	9	BPI: Gold; BEA: Gold; RMNZ: Gold; SNEP: Gold	Right Now (re-release)
"You Are"	2001	90 (Note: "You Are" was not released in the United Kingdom. Despite this, the song did make it into the top 100 due to CD-single imports.)	—	46	24	—	61	—	31	13	40		Right Now (re-release)
"It's OK!"	2002	3	24	9	33	8	18	7	9	16	7	BPI: Silver	Feels So Good
"The Tide Is High (Get the Feeling)"	2002	1	4	3	5	10	3	1	2	1	4	BPI: Platinum; ARIA: Platinum; RMNZ: 2× Platinum	Feels So Good
"The Last Goodbye"	2002	2	—	13	33	20	28	5	13	11	28		Feels So Good
"Be with You"	2002	2	10	34	29	18	36	5	27	15	39		Feels So Good
"Love Doesn't Have to Hurt"	2003	4	—	—	—	—	—	13	65	—	—		Feels So Good
"If You Come to Me"	2003	3	30	6	26	14	10	8	14	9	10		Ladies Night
"Ladies' Night" (featuring Kool & The Gang)	2003	8	39	32	18	12	33	14	15	—	38		Ladies Night
"Someone like Me"	2004	8	—	—	58	—	67	18	52	—	42		Greatest Hits
"Right Now 2004"	2004	8	—	—	58	—	—	18	52	—	—		Greatest Hits
"Cradle"	2005	10	—	—	—	—	—	46	—	—	—		Greatest Hits
"Anyone Who Had a Heart"	2008	77	—	—	—	—	—	—	—	—	—		Liverpool – The Number Ones Album
"Southgate You're the One"	2021	14	—	—	—	—	—	—	—	—	—		Non-album single
"—" denotes releases that did not chart or were not released in that territory.

=== As featured artist ===
List of singles, with selected chart positions
Title	Year	Peak chart positions					Album
Title	Year	UK	AUT	GER	IRE	SWI	Album
"All Together Now (Strong Together)" (Goleo VI featuring Atomic Kitten)	2006	—	35	16	—	42	Goleo VI Presents His 2006 FIFA World Cup Hits
"I Wish It Could Be Christmas Everyday" (among The Big Reunion cast)	2013	21	—	—	82	—	Non-album single
"—" denotes releases that did not chart or were not released in that territory.

== Other appearances ==
Title	Year	Other artist(s)	Album
"The Locomotion"	2000	—N/a	Thomas and the Magic Railroad
"Good Vibrations"	2002	Emma Bunton and Brian Wilson	Party at The Palace
"Shame, Shame, Shame"	2002	Lulu	Together
"(I Wanna Be) Like Other Girls"	2005	—N/a	Mulan II

== Music videos ==
List of music videos, showing year released and director
Title	Year	Director
"Right Now"	1999	Phil Griffin
"See Ya"	2000	Katie Bell
"Cradle"	2000	Alex Hemmings
"I Want Your Love"	2000	Phil Griffin
"Follow Me"	2000	Alex Hemmings
"Whole Again"	2001	Phil Griffin
"Whole Again" (US version)	2001	Trey Fanjoy
"Eternal Flame"	2001	Phil Griffin
"You Are"	2001	Phil Griffin
"It's OK!"	2002	Jake Nava
"The Tide Is High (Get the Feeling)"	2002	Jake Nava
"The Last Goodbye"	2002	Jake Nava
"Be with You"	2002	Jake Nava
"Love Doesn't Have to Hurt"	2003	Phil Griffin
"If You Come to Me"	2003	Si & Ad
"Ladies Night"	2003	Cameron Casey
"Someone Like Me"	2004	Phil Griffin
"Right Now 2004"	2004	Mike Cockayne
"Cradle 2005"	2005	Mike Cockayne
"Anyone Who Had a Heart"	2008	Andreas Wicklund
