= Right Here, Right Now (video) =

Video by Atomic Kitten
- Released: 30 September 2002
- Recorded: Waterfront Hall, Belfast
- Genre: Pop
- Length: ~130:00
- Label: Eagle Rock Entertainment
- Producer: Steve Kemsley

Atomic Kitten chronology
So Far So Good (2001)	Right Here, Right Now (2002)	Be with Us (2003)

Right Here, Right Now is a 2002 DVD by Atomic Kitten. The DVD was recorded at Waterfront Hall in Belfast in 2002 during their tour, and features the live band "The Phat Cats", and also contains "The Kitten Diaries" which was 48 minute documentary previously aired by Channel 4 made by the girl group themselves consisting of backstage footage during their 2002 United Kingdom tour, rehearsals for shows, and the making of "It's OK!" in South Africa. The diary was mainly shot using handheld cameras.

== Track listing ==
#	Title
1.	"Right Now"
2.	"Turn Me On"
3.	"Eternal Flame"
4.	"Tomorrow And Tonight"
5.	"Hippy"
6.	"Get Real"
7.	"Strangers"
8.	"Cradle"
9.	"You Are"
10.	"Follow Me"
11.	"It's OK!"
12.	"See Ya"
13.	"I Want Your Love"
14.	"Kids in America"
15.	"Bye Now"
16.	"Whole Again"
17.	"Dancing in the Street"
Bonus tracks
1.	Making of "It's Ok!"
2.	"The Tide Is High" (promo video)
3.	The Kitten Diaries

== Personnel ==
Performers
Natasha Hamilton	Vocals
Liz McClarnon	Vocals
Jenny Frost	Vocals
Julian Emery	Guitar
Steve Barney	Drums
Gordon "Pemmo"	Bass guitar
Ciaron Bell	Keyboards
Adam Wakeman	Keyboards

Personnel
Steve Kemsley	Producer
Martin O'Shea	Executive producer
Janine Coleman	Dubbing mixer
