= So Far So Good (video) =

Video by Atomic Kitten
- Released: 26 November 2001
- Recorded: 1999–2001
- Genre: Pop
- Length: ~93:00
- Label: Vision Video
- Director: Steve Kemsley
- Producer: Nikki Gillespie, Steve Kemsley, and Martin O'Shea

Atomic Kitten chronology
So Far So Good (2001)	Right Here, Right Now (2002)

So Far So Good is the first DVD by Atomic Kitten and was released in 2001. It is also available as video. It is also the only DVD which features Kerry Katona before she left the band due to her pregnancy. The video consists of interviews and footage of the promotion tours, the first big concert in Liverpool. The majority of the footage was created using handheld cameras.

It also contains the music videos for "Right Now", "See Ya", "I Want Your Love", "Follow Me", "Whole Again", two versions of "Eternal Flame" and "You Are".

== Track listing ==
#	Title
1.	"In the Beginning"
2.	"Kerry Leaving"
3.	"Liverpool"
4.	"The First Gig Ever"
5.	"Mike Bassett England Manager"
6.	"Germany"
7.	"Israel"
8.	"Home and Away"
9.	"AK Motor Sport
10.	"Party in the Park
11.	"The Record Co.
12.	"Going to No. 1"
13.	"Shopping"
14.	"London Live"
15.	"Having a Laugh"
Music videos
1.	"Right Now"
2.	"See Ya"
3.	"I Want Your Love"
4.	"Follow Me"
5.	"Whole Again"
6.	"Eternal Flame"
7.	"Eternal Flame" (Parole Officer version)
8.	"You Are"

== Personnel ==
Cast
Natasha Hamilton
Liz McClarnon
Jenny Frost
Kerry Katona
Andy McCluskey
Brian Dowling

Personnel
Steve Kemsley	Director
Chris Hall	Editor
Simon Thomas	Graphics
Janine Coleman	Sound
Matt Green	Sound
Adam Moreve	Sound
Matt Vaughn	Sound
Phil Bradshaw	Camera
Mark Moreve	Camera
Michael Shallvey	Camera
Jay Tubb	Camera
