= The Greatest Hits (Atomic Kitten album) =

2004 compilation album by Atomic Kitten

Greatest hits album by Atomic Kitten
- Released: 5 April 2004
- Recorded: 1999–2004
- Genre: Pop
- Length: 49:49
- Labels: Innocent; Virgin

Atomic Kitten chronology
Ladies Night (2003)	The Greatest Hits (2004)	The Collection (2005)

Singles from The Greatest Hits
- 1. "Someone like Me"/"Right Now 2004" Released: 29 March 2004; 2. "Cradle" Released: 14 February 2005

The Greatest Hits is the first compilation album by the English girl group Atomic Kitten. It was released by Innocent Records and Virgin Records on 5 April 2004 in the United Kingdom, following the announcement of their disbandment. Containing all of the group's chart hits from their first three studio albums Right Now (2000), Feels So Good (2002) and Ladies Night (2003), it reached the top five of the UK Albums Chart and number eight in New Zealand. "Someone like Me," initially recorded for Ladies Night, and "Right Now 2004," a re-recording of their debut single, were released as double single on 29 March 2004.

== Critical reception ==
Professional ratings
Review scores
Source	Rating
AllMusic	4/5 stars

AllMusic editor Andy Kellman wrote that "a European release, Greatest Hits should provide just about anyone with all the Atomic Kitten that's necessary [...] It touches on each of the group's studio albums with a strong emphasis placed on the single [...] Why the US powers that be never gave this group (and Sugababes) more of a chance is anyone's guess." Annabel Leathes from BBC Music felt that "if this hits collection is to be their parting gift, then weeping fans will not be disappointed. The album features fifteen tracks from the felines, most of which are a fair representation of the Kittens' consistent chart success."

== Chart performance ==
The Greatest Hits debuted and peaked at number five on the UK Albums Chart in the week of 11 April 2004. This marked the band's fourth consecutive top five album in the United Kingdom. It was certified Silver by the British Phonographic Industry (BPI) on 16 April 2004 for domestic shipments in excess of 60,000 copies and ranked 126th on the UK Albums year-end chart. The Greatest Hits also reached top ten in Scotland and New Zealand where it peaked at number four and eight, respectively, and reached the top 20 in Ireland and the top in Austria.

== Track listing ==
The Greatest Hits track listing
No.	Title	Writer(s)	Producer(s)	Length
1.	"Whole Again" (2001 radio mix)	Andy McCluskey; Stuart Kershaw; Jem Godfrey; Bill Padley	Engine; Padley^{[b]}; Godfrey^{[b]}	3:07
2.	"Ladies Night" (featuring Kool & the Gang)	Ronald Bell; Kool & the Gang	Khalis Bayyan; Leigh Guest; Andy Whitmore^{[a]}; Ash Howes^{[b]}; Martin Harrington^{[b]}	3:08
3.	"The Tide Is High (Get the Feeling)"	John Holt; Howard Barrett; Tyrone Evans; Bill Padley; Jem Godfrey	Padley; Godfrey; Carrie Grant^{[b]}	3:27
4.	"It's OK!"	Mikkel Storleer Eriksen; Hallgeir Rustan; Tor Erik Hermansen	Stargate	3:15
5.	"Be with You"	Greg Wilson; Tracey Carmen; Martin Foster; Jeff Lynne	Howes; Harrington	3:38
6.	"If You Come to Me"	Richard "Biff" Stannard; Julian Gallagher; Sharon Murphy; Howes; Harrington	Stannard; Gallagher; Howes^{[b]}; Harrington^{[b]}	3:46
7.	"Eternal Flame" (single version)	Billy Steinberg; Tom Kelly; Susanna Hoffs	Andy Wright	3:13
8.	"Love Doesn't Have to Hurt" (single version)	Steinberg; Kelly; Hoffs	Padley; Godfrey; Grant^{[b]}	3:28
9.	"The Last Goodbye" (single version)	Espen Lind; Amund Bjorklund; Eriksen; Rustan; Hermansen; Daniel Poku	Stargate	3:07
10.	"Right Now 2004"	McCluskey; Kershaw	Howes; Harington	3:48
11.	"See Ya"	McCluskey; Kershaw; Liz McClarnon	Engine	2:52
12.	"I Want Your Love" (album version)	McCluskey; Drummond; McClarnon; Jerome Moross; Jimmy Cauty; Lyte; Kershaw	Damien Mendis; Stuart Bradbury; Engine^{[b]}	3:15
13.	"You Are" (single version)	Paul Gendler; Wayne Hector; Steve Mac; Ali Tennant	Mac	3:31
14.	"Cradle" (alternate mix)	McCluskey; Kershaw; Peter Strudwick	Quiz & Larossi; Ray Ruffin^{[b]}	3:45
15.	"Someone like Me" (single version)	McClarnon; Ciaron Bell	Bell	2:09

Spanish bonus tracks
No.	Title	Writer(s)	Producer(s)	Length
16.	"Ser tu Pasión, Eres mi Obsesión"	Holt; Barrett; Evans; Padley; Godfrey; Baja Music	Padley; Godfrey; Grant^{[b]}	3:26

Japanese bonus tracks
No.	Title	Writer(s)	Producer(s)	Length
16.	"Daydream Believer" (Beat Gallery remix)	John Stewart	Shin Murayama	3:26
17.	"Be with You" (Milky 7" edit)	Wilson; Carmen; Foster; Lynne	Howes; Harrington; Milky^{[b]}	3:34

Notes

- ^{^[a]} denotes co-producer
- ^{^[b]} denotes additional producer
- Kerry Katona's vocals appear on "Cradle", "I Want Your Love" and "See Ya", while Frost's vocals appear on "Whole Again", which Katona originally featured on.

Sample credits

- "Be with You" contains a sample from "Last Train to London" performed by Electric Light Orchestra.

== Charts ==
=== Weekly charts ===
Weekly chart performance for The Greatest Hits
Chart (2004)	Peak position
Austrian Albums (Ö3 Austria)	24
Belgian Albums (Ultratop Flanders)	63
Dutch Albums (Album Top 100)	35
German Albums (Offizielle Top 100)	35
Irish Albums (IRMA)	19
New Zealand Albums (RMNZ)	8
Scottish Albums (Official Charts)	4
South African Albums (RISA)	16
Swiss Albums (Schweizer Hitparade)	61
UK Albums (Official Charts)	5

=== Year-end charts ===
Year-end chart performance for The Greatest Hits
Chart (2004)	Position
UK Albums (OCC)	126

== Certifications ==
Certifications for The Greatest Hits
Region	Certification	Certified units/sales
New Zealand (RMNZ)	Gold	7,500^{^}
South Africa (RISA)	Platinum	50,000^{*}
United Kingdom (BPI)	Gold	100,000^{^}
^{*} Sales figures based on certification alone.^{^} Shipments figures based on certification alone.

== Release history ==
The Greatest Hits release history
Region	Date	Format	Label
United Kingdom	5 April 2004	CD; digital download	Innocent; Virgin
Australia	24 May 2004	CD; digital download	Innocent; Virgin
