= Hotter Than My Daughter =

- Genre: Reality
- Presented by: Liz McClarnon
- Country of origin: United Kingdom
- Original language: English
- No. of series: 2
- No. of episodes: 14

Production
- Running time: 30 minutes

Original release
- Network: BBC Three
- Release: 4 February 2010 – 8 March 2011

Hotter Than My Daughter is a British reality television series on BBC Three hosted by Atomic Kitten member Liz McClarnon. It focuses on mother/daughter relationships in which the mothers claim to be hotter than their daughters.

== Premise ==
Liz McClarnon visits the home of a mother and daughter, where the daughter is embarrassed by the way her mother dresses and acts and the mother thinks her daughter should dress more her age. McClarnon talks to the mother and daughter separately and asks them how they feel about each other's looks and asks the mother if she feels she is hotter than her daughter. A lifesize fold-out picture of the two is shown to 5 members of the 'Great British public', called 'Joe Jury' who consider whether the mother, daughter, or both of them should have a makeover, and the guilty party/parties is/are given a style overhaul by the Hotter Than My Daughter style team.

Occasionally, two people that are not mother and daughter feature in the show, such as sisters or friends, and this is also decided by a 'jury'. There is no need for a 'Jury' if it is already decided who needs the makeover and they are given the makeover. At the end of the show, the viewers are shown photographs to see if they kept their new look(s).

== Series ==
Series 1 comprised six episodes. Series 2 comprised eight episodes.

== Criticism ==
The show led The Guardian columnist Lucy Mangan to challenge the BBC to explain how it conforms to that corporation's self-declared mission.
