= Be with Us (A Year With...) =

Video by Atomic Kitten
- Released: 1 December 2003
- Recorded: 2002–2003
- Genre: Pop
- Length: ~90:00
- Label: Virgin Records

Atomic Kitten chronology
Right Here, Right Now (2002)	Be with Us (A Year With...) (2003)	The Greatest Hits Live at Wembley Arena (2004)

Be with Us (A Year With...) is a 2003 DVD by English girl group Atomic Kitten. The DVD mainly consists of behind the scenes footage of a year in the life of the band.

== DVD information ==
Filmed over the course of 12 months, Liz McClarnon, Natasha Hamilton and Jenny Frost give an inside look how the music videos were recorded, give a glimpse into their private lives, and take a bike ride through Singapore. The DVD also contains footage of various major and minor performances across the globe. The timeframe coincides with the release of the Ladies Night album.

The video features the music videos for "Ladies Night", "If You Come to Me", "Be with You", "The Last Goodbye", and "The Tide Is High". The DVD also contains a photo gallery.

The DVD was certified Gold on 25 February 2005.

== Track listing ==
#	Title	Length
1.	"Opening"	3:32
2.	"Summer Bay Gig"	6:06
3.	"Designing Our Clothes"	1:26
4.	"The Tide Is High (Get the Feeling) (Making the Video)"	4:15
5.	"Songs from Bond"	3:52
6.	"Off to Singapore"	6:18
7.	"Our Fans"	6:15
8.	"Up, Up and Away"	1:08
9.	"Bangkok"	5:07
10.	"Fun in the Sun"	2:47
11.	"Bangkok Nights"	7:32
12.	"The Last Goodbye (Making the Video)"	5:21
13.	"Pop Pads"	4:49
14.	"Our Smallest Gig Ever"	3:53
15.	"Tide Is High Shows"	4:10
16.	"Brrr, It's Lapland"	3:00
17.	"Home with Jen's Folks"	3:01
18.	"Writing Songs"	2:14
19.	"Launching Our Clothes"	2:59
20.	"Launching Our Car"	1:32
21.	"Sunny South Africa"	4:01
22.	"Back to Liverpool"	2:18
23.	"Wow, It Feels So Good"	4:36

Music Videos:

- "Ladies Night"
- "If You Come to Me"
- "Be With You"
- "The Last Goodbye"
- "The Tide Is High (Get The Feeling)"

Plus the girls singing:

- "Never Gonna Give You Up" in the lift
- "Cheeky Song (Touch My Bum)" in a radio interview
- "I'll Be There for You" seen in the behind the scenes of The Last Goodbye
- "It's Raining Men"
- "The Ketchup Song (Aserejé)"
- "Rudolph The Red Nosed Reindeer"
- "Live and Let Die"
- "Insomnia"
- "How Soon Is Now?"

and much more
