= Someone like Me (song) =

2004 single by Atomic Kitten

"Someone Like Me"

Single by Atomic Kitten

from the album Ladies Night and Greatest Hits
- A-side: "Right Now 2004"
- B-side: "Wild"
- Released: 29 March 2004
- Length: 2:09
- Label: Innocent; Virgin
- Songwriters: Ciaron Bell; Liz McClarnon
- Producer: Ciaron Bell

Atomic Kitten singles chronology
| "Ladies Night" (2003) | "Someone Like Me" / "Right Now 2004" (2004) | "Cradle" (2005) |

Audio video
- "Someone Like Me" on YouTube

"Someone Like Me" is a song by British girl group Atomic Kitten. Released on 29 March 2004 as the third and final single from their third studio album, Ladies Night (2003), the piano-driven track was issued as a double A-side with "Right Now 2004", a remixed version of their debut single, "Right Now". With the group having announced their split prior to the song's release, it was originally intended to be released as their final single, though they later released a further three one-off singles in 2005 and two charity singles in 2006 and 2008. The group reformed officially in September 2012 without Jenny Frost, who was replaced with original member Kerry Katona.

== Background ==
"Someone Like Me" was written by Ciaron Bell and Liz McClarnon, and produced by Bell. A slight alteration was made to the song for the single release: on the album version of the song, McClarnon performs the entirety of the song, but for the single version, Jenny Frost sings the second verse and Natasha Hamilton sings the third and final verse.

== Chart performance ==
The song peaked on the UK Singles Chart at number eight, subsequently going on to sell 50,000 copies in the UK alone, making it a moderate success. The single was also a top 20 hit in Ireland, going straight in at number 18. In the Flanders region of Belgium, it reached number eight on the Ultratip chart. The single also charted in the Netherlands and Switzerland but did not make the top 40 in either.

== Music video ==
The music video for "Someone Like Me" features all three girls in white clothes in a room which is plain white. While Liz plays the piano to start of the video, the other two girls are seen lying down on a sofa, and then a view is shown of the girls from outside the room, by a door opening. The video was intended to be simple and basic, much like the video for "Whole Again".

== Track listings ==
UK CD1
| No. | Title | Writer(s) | Producer(s) | Length |
|---|---|---|---|---|
| 1. | "Someone Like Me" | Ciaron Bell; Liz McClarnon | Bell | 2:05 |
| 2. | "Right Now 2004" | Stuart Kershaw; Andy McCluskey | Ash Howes; Martin Harrington | 3:45 |

UK CD2
| No. | Title | Writer(s) | Producer(s) | Length |
|---|---|---|---|---|
| 1. | "Right Now 2004" | Kershaw; McCluskey | Howes; Harrington | 3:45 |
| 2. | "Someone Like Me" | Bell; McClarnon | Bell | 2:05 |
| 3. | "Wild" | Tom Nichols; Ben Chapman; Jenny Frost | Chapman | 3:42 |
| 4. | "Right Now 2004" (video) | | | 2:04 |

European CD single
| No. | Title | Writer(s) | Producer(s) | Length |
|---|---|---|---|---|
| 1. | "Right Now 2004" | Kershaw; McCluskey | Howes; Harrington | 3:45 |
| 2. | "Someone Like Me" | Bell; McClarnon | Bell | 2:05 |

European maxi-CD single
| No. | Title | Writer(s) | Producer(s) | Length |
|---|---|---|---|---|
| 1. | "Right Now 2004" | Kershaw; McCluskey | Howes; Harrington | 3:45 |
| 2. | "Someone Like Me" | Bell; McClarnon | Bell | 2:05 |
| 3. | "Wild" | Nichols; Chapman; Frost | Chapman | 3:42 |

== Charts ==
=== Weekly charts ===
| Chart (2004) | Peak position |
|---|---|
| Belgium (Ultratip Bubbling Under Flanders) | 8 |
| Ireland (IRMA) | 18 |
| Netherlands (Single Top 100) | 52 |
| Scottish Singles Sales (Official Charts) | 6 |
| Switzerland (Schweizer Hitparade) | 42 |
| UK Singles (Official Charts) | 8 |
| UK Airplay (Music Week) | 20 |

=== Year-end charts ===
| Chart (2004) | Position |
|---|---|
| UK Singles (OCC) | 169 |
