= You Are (Atomic Kitten song) =

2001 single by Atomic Kitten

Single by Atomic Kitten

from the album Right Now
- Released: 26 November 2001
- Studio: Rokstone (London, England)
- Length: 3:27
- Label: Innocent; Virgin
- Songwriters: Paul Gendler; Wayne Hector; Steve Mac; Ali Tennant
- Producer: Steve Mac

Atomic Kitten singles chronology
"Eternal Flame" (2001)	"You Are" (2001)	"It's OK!" (2002)

Audio
- "You Are" on YouTube

"You Are" is a song by English pop girl group Atomic Kitten. It was written by Paul Gendler, Wayne Hector, Ali Tennant, and Steve Mac and recorded for the 2001 reissue of the band's debut album, Right Now (2000), while production was helmed by Mac. "You Are" is an uplifting midtempo ballad; the instrumental elements used on it include keyboards, a piano, strummy guitars, soft drums, and a prominent string riff. Lyrically, the song finds the female protagonist expressing her love and affection for a man who doubts whether he is the right one for her.

"You Are" was released as the second and final single from reissued version of Right Now on 26 November 2001. It peaked at number 13 on the New Zealand Singles Chart and found success in several European countries, particularly in Flanders, the Netherlands, and Switzerland, where it entered the top 40. In the United Kingdom, "You Are" was released as a promotional single only since Innocent Records feared that the band would not be able to promote the single as intense as necessary to guarantee a top-10 entry due to overseas touring. A music video, directed by Phil Griffin, was initially planned to be filmed in New York City but was eventually scrapped in favor of a studio recording due to the 11 September attacks.

== Background ==
"You Are" was written by Paul Gendler, Wayne Hector, Ali Tennant, and Steve Mac and originally intended to be recorded by Irish boy band Westlife. When Atomic Kitten recorded the song at Rokstone Studios in London, England, it was introduced on the 2001 re-issue of their debut album Right Now. The album version of "You Are" differs from the single version, as the single version features newly recorded vocals and a new musical arrangement. On the album version, Natasha Hamilton performs every solo in the song. However, for the single version, Liz McClarnon performs half of the verses, whilst Jenny Frost performs the background vocals and responses. British songwriter Tracy Ackerman provided backing vocals on the song.

== Chart performance ==
"You Are" became a top-20 hit in New Zealand, where it peaked at number 13, staying in the top 50 for 15 weeks—a third of which were in the top 20; it was the song's highest peak anywhere. The song also did well in Flemish Belgium, where it peaked at number 24. It stayed in the chart for 11 weeks. It was their fourth longest single in the chart over there, lasting eleven weeks in the top 50. In Wallonia, the song was less successful, only reaching number nine on the Ultratip chart, which roughly corresponds to number 59 overall. In neighbouring Netherlands, the song debuted at number 84 and climbed to its peak of number 35 five weeks later, totalling 10 weeks on the chart. In Sweden, "You Are" peaked at number 52 on its second week in, but only stayed on the chart for three weeks.

In German-speaking Europe, the song managed to peak at number 61 in Germany. In Switzerland, the song peaked at number 40 and stayed on the chart for 16 weeks—the longest out of any country it was released in. The song debuted and peaked at number 46 in Austria, and lasted seven weeks on the chart. In France, it attained a peak of number 86, subsequently lasting three weeks in the top 100. Although "You Are" was initially planned to be released in the UK, it was eventually not released as a single since Innocent Records feared that the band would not be able to promote the single as properly as necessary to guarantee a top-10 entry due to ongoing overseas touring with "Whole Again." However, the song did make it into the top 100 due to imports, peaking at number 90 on the UK Singles Chart.

== Music video ==
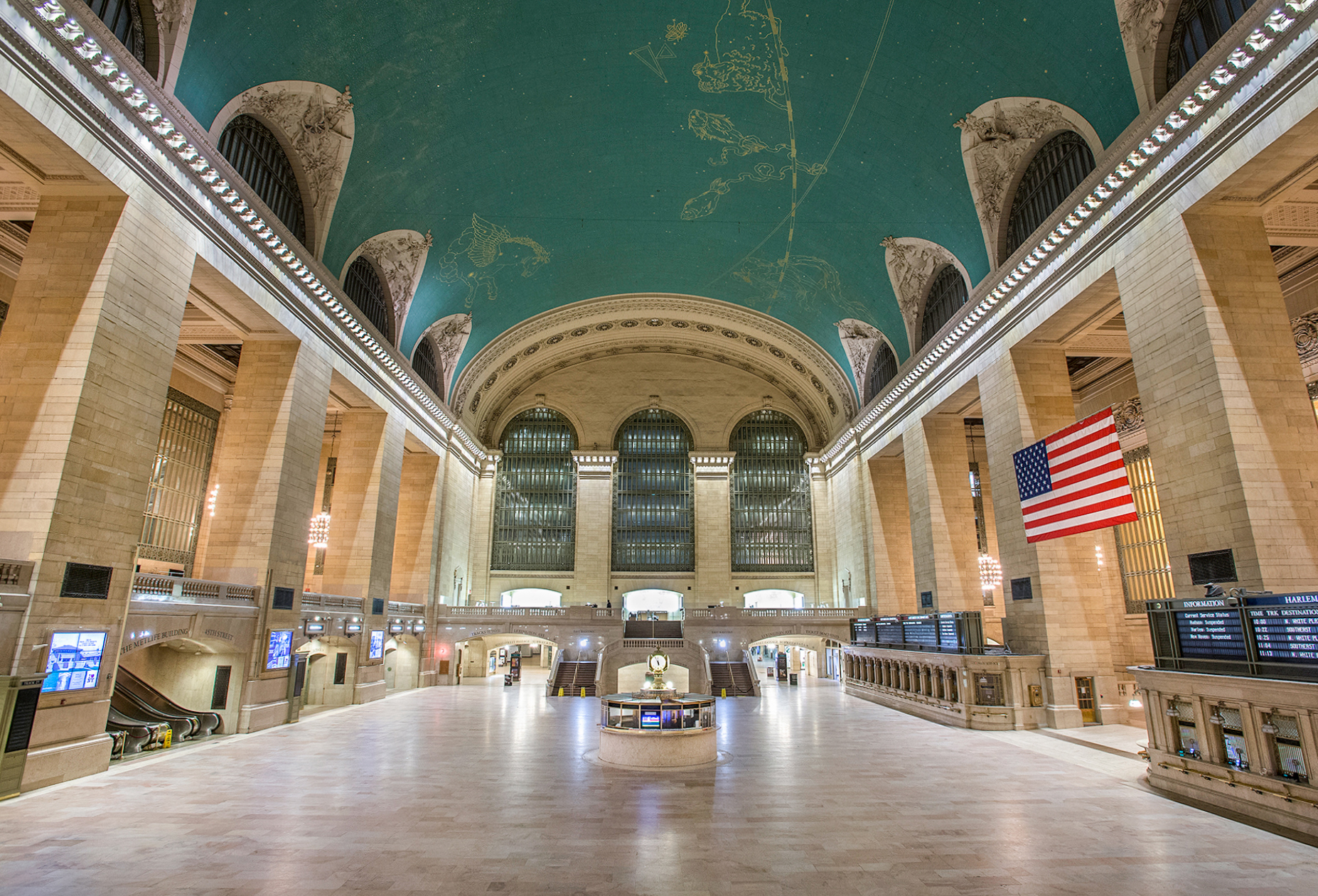
Plans to film a video at the Grand Central Station were scrapped due to the 11 September attacks.

An accompanying music video for "You Are" was originally planned to be filmed at Grand Central Station in Midtown Manhattan, New York City in early September 2001; however, plans had to be scrapped in the wake of the 11 September attacks. While it was reported that Atomic Kitten were expected to film the video at railway stations in the United Kingdom instead, portions for the video were eventually filmed on a specially built stage set. Their fifth collaboration with director Phil Griffin, the visuals for "You Are" depict the group on a glass stage with a plain white background and two large speakers either side of the stage. The video starts off with the group in a line sitting on chairs. A basic dance routine accompanies the chorus. After the chorus, the group walk about on the stage at a non stylised pace, and doing the jog moves on the stage, and close-ups of the members' eyes, lips and faces conclude the video. Throughout the video, various scenes of a young couple are also spliced in.

== Track listings ==
UK CD single
No.	Title	Writer(s)	Producer(s)	Length
1.	"You Are"	Paul Gendler; Wayne Hector; Steve Mac; Ali Tennant	Mac	3:27
2.	"Right Now" (M*A*S*H radio mix)	Andy McCluskey; Stuart Kershaw	Absolute; M*A*S*H^{[a]}	3:36

French 12-inch maxi-single
No.	Title	Writer(s)	Producer(s)	Length
1.	"You Are" (M*A*S*H mix)	Gendler; Hector; Mac; Tennant	Mac; M*A*S*H^{[a]}	7:11
2.	"You Are" (M*A*S*H radio mix)	Gendler; Hector; Mac; Tennant	Mac; M*A*S*H^{[a]}	3:37
3.	"You Are" (radio edit)	Gendler; Hector; Mac; Tennant	Mac	3:30

European and Australian maxi-CD single
No.	Title	Writer(s)	Producer(s)	Length
1.	"You Are"	Gendler; Hector; Mac; Tennant	Mac	3:27
2.	"You Are" (M*A*S*H radio mix)	Gendler; Hector; Mac; Tennant	Mac; M*A*S*H^{[a]}	3:37
3.	"Megamix"			6:00
4.	"You Are" (video)

Notes

- ^{^[a]} denotes additional producer

== Credits and personnel ==
Credits are adapted from the liner notes of Right Now.

Studio

- Recorded and mixed at Rokstone Studios (London, England)

Personnel

- Tracy Ackerman – backing vocals
- Atomic Kitten – lead vocals
- Paul Gendler – writing
- Wayne Hector – writing
- Friðrik "Frizzy" Karlsson – guitars
- Chris Laws – drums, engineering
- Steve Mac – writing, production, arranging, mixing, instruments
- Daniel Pursey – assistant engineer
- Ali Tennant – writing

== Charts ==
Chart (2001)	Peak position
Austria (Ö3 Austria Top 40)	46
Belgium (Ultratop 50 Flanders)	24
France (SNEP)	86
Germany (GfK)	61
Netherlands (Dutch Top 40)	31
Netherlands (Single Top 100)	35
New Zealand (Recorded Music NZ)	13
Scotland Singles (OCC)	91
Sweden (Sverigetopplistan)	52
Switzerland (Schweizer Hitparade)	40
UK Singles (OCC)	90
UK Airplay (Music Week)	37
