= The Greatest Hits Live at Wembley Arena =

Video by Atomic Kitten
- Released: 19 April 2004
- Recorded: 29 February 2004
- Genre: Pop
- Length: ~145:00
- Label: EMI
- Director: Mike Cockayne

Atomic Kitten chronology
Be with Us (2003)	The Greatest Hits Live at Wembley Arena (2004)

The Greatest Hits Live at Wembley Arena is a compilation DVD by Atomic Kitten containing the group's concert at Wembley Arena, Wembley Park, which was given at 29 February 2004 and directed by Mike Cockayne. The DVD also combined with a selection of the Greatest Hits music videos.

A similar DVD was released a year later for the Asian market which included a B-sides and remix album as well entitled Access All Areas: Remixed & B-Side, with a slightly different track listing.

== Track listing ==
#	Title
01.	Be With You
02.	It's OK!
03.	Don't Go Breaking My Heart
04.	Somebody Like You
05.	Love Doesn't Have To Hurt
06.	If You Come To Me
07.	The Last Goodbye
08.	I Won't Be There
09.	Nothing in the World
10.	Right Now
11.	Lovin' You
12.	Always Be My Baby
13.	Everything Goes Around
14.	Eternal Flame
15.	Someone Like Me
16.	Believer
17.	Feels So Good
18.	Holiday Medley
19.	Whole Again
20.	The Tide Is High (Get The Feeling)
21.	Ladies Night (feat. The Kool & The Gang)

Music videos:

#	Title
01.	Right Now
02.	See Ya
03.	I Want Your Love
04.	Follow Me
05.	Whole Again (Jenny Frost Version)
06.	Eternal Flame
07.	You Are
08.	It's OK
09.	The Tide Is High (Get The Feeling)
10.	The Last Goodbye
11.	Be With You
12.	Love Doesn't Have To Hurt
13.	If You Come To Me
14.	Ladies Night
15.	Right Now 2004
16.	Someone Like Me
17.	Whole Again (Original Video – Kerry Katona)
18.	Cradle
