= Right Now (Atomic Kitten album) =

1999 studio album by Atomic Kitten

- Original UK cover

Studio album by Atomic Kitten
- Released: 16 March 2000
- Genre: Pop; dance-pop
- Length: 38:07 (original); 47:00 (re-issue)
- Label: Innocent; Virgin
- Producer: Absolute; Stuart Bradbury; Pete Craigie; Cutfather & Joe; Engine; Jem Godfrey; John Holliday; Damien Mendis; Bill Padley; Quiet Money; Quiz & Larossi; Trevor Steele

Atomic Kitten chronology
| Right Now (2000) | Feels So Good (2002) |

Alternative covers
- 2001 re-issued cover featuring replacement member Jenny Frost.

Singles from Right Now
- 1. "Right Now" Released: 29 November 1999; 2. "See Ya" Released: 27 March 2000; 3. "I Want Your Love" Released: 3 July 2000; 4. "Daydream Believer" Released: 26 July 2000 (Japan only); 5. "Follow Me" Released: 9 October 2000; 6. "Whole Again" Released: 29 January 2001; 7. "Eternal Flame" Released: 23 July 2001; 8. "You Are" Released: 26 November 2001

Right Now is the debut studio album by English girl group Atomic Kitten. It was initially released in Japan by Virgin Records on 16 March 2000, followed by a domestic release in the United Kingdom through Innocent Records in October, and later received an international release in August 2001. Orchestral Manoeuvres in the Dark members and Atomic Kitten founders, Andy McCluskey and Stuart Kershaw, were among the album's principal songwriters, with additional contributions from producers including Damien Mendis, Stuart Bradbury, Simon Franglen, Cutfather & Joe, Absolute, and others.

The album received mixed reviews from critics, with some praising its catchy pop sound and infectious hooks, while others criticized its production and songwriting as thin or overly commercial. Right Now initially charted modestly in the UK, putting the group at risk of being dropped by their record label, but its 2001 reissue, featuring vocals from new member Jenny Frost, topped the UK Albums Chart, remained in the top 100 for thirty-seven weeks, earned double platinum certification, and also achieved strong international chart success and certifications across Europe, New Zealand, and South Africa.

After a series of early singles and moderate success with the album’s title track, "See Ya", and "I Want Your Love," Atomic Kitten achieved a major breakthrough with a re-recorded version of their song "Whole Again", which topped the UK Singles Chart for four weeks and became an international hit. This success led to several additional hit singles such as the Bangles cover "Eternal Flame", also a UK number-one, and "You Are", both of which charted strongly in multiple countries. To further promote the album, the band embarked on the Right Here, Right Now Tour from 2001 to 2002.

== Background ==
Atomic Kitten were formed in 1998 by English musician Andy McCluskey, frontman of the new wave band OMD. Following OMD's hiatus in 1996, Karl Bartos of Kraftwerk suggested that McCluskey create a new group to serve as a vehicle for his songwriting, as OMD's style had become less commercially prominent during the rise of grunge and indie rock. Bartos specifically recommended forming a three-member girl band. McCluskey co-founded the group with fellow OMD member Stuart Kershaw, and both served as the primary songwriters for the band's studio recordings in the late 1990s and early 2000s. The original lineup consisted of Liz McClarnon, Kerry Katona, and Heidi Range, though the group initially had no official name, before selecting Atomic Kitten, inspired by the name of a fashion label.

While McCluskey and Kershaw wrote and produced the majority of the material on Atomic Kitten's debut album Right Now under the production pseudonym Engine, they also consulted Damien Mendis, Stuart Bradbury, Pete Craigie, Simon Franglen, Cutfather & Joe, and production team Absolute to work the girls. Although much of the album had already been completed, Range departed the group after eight months following the offer of a separate record deal. In May 1999, after auditions were held to fill the vacancy, Natasha Hamilton joined the band as the new third member. Following Hamilton’s addition, the group was required to re-record songs on Right Now that had already been recorded with Range. In the meantime, McCluskey and Kershaw secured the band a record deal with Innocent Records.

== Promotion ==
With Right Now already completed, the album's release was fast-tracked after Atomic Kitten signed with Innocent Records. The group's debut single, "Right Now", produced by Absolute, was released in late November 1999 and reached number ten on the UK Singles Chart. "See Ya," produced by Engine and Pete Craigie and co-written by McClarnon, followed in March 2000 and reached number six. Following this initial success, Atomic Kitten performed an Asian tour and achieved their first number-one hit in Asia with "Cradle." With "I Want Your Love," helmed by Damien Mendis and Stuart Bradbury, and "Follow Me," a Trevor Steel contribution, two further singles followed between the March 2000 release of Right Now in Japan and the album's October 2000 release in the United Kingdom, with the former emerging as the band's third consecutive UK top ten single. In Japan, a cover of The Monkees' 1967 hit "Daydream Believer" also received a promotional release in July 2000.

A&R manager Hugh Goldsmith requested Jem Godfrey and Bill Padley to rework "Whole Again", which he felt was only half-finished, as a potential single, prompting the songwriters to replace the all-spoken verses with a sung melody; only for the re-recorded song to be held back in favour of "Follow Me". After "Follow Me" peaked in the top 20, Innocent Records pushed for Atomic Kitten to be dropped from the label. In a last-ditch attempt to save the band's record deal, McCluskey and Kershaw persuaded the executives to release "Whole Again" as a single. Released in January 2001, "Whole Again" marked a major turning point for Atomic Kitten: It debuted at number one in the UK, remaining atop the chart for four weeks, while becoming one of the best-selling girl group singles of all time. The single also served as the group's international breakthrough, topping charts in Germany, New Zealand, Austria, Ireland, and the Netherlands, and entering the top 20 in several other countries, earning multiple platinum certifications.

During promotion for the single, Katona announced her pregnancy and her subsequent decision to leave the group. As "Whole Again" began to gain momentum, the remaining members chose to recruit Jenny Frost, formerly of fellow British girl group Precious, as her replacement and continued their promotional campaign. Frost's first official release with Atomic Kitten was a cover of the Bangles song "Eternal Flame," recorded for the 2001 reissue of Right Now and released in July 2001. Another commercial success, the single became the group's second UK number-one hit, while also topping the charts in Belgium and New Zealand and reaching the top ten in most other territories where it charted. "You Are," another single from the album's reissue, was released in November 2001. Originally written for Westlife and featuring slightly different vocals from the album version, the Steve Mac-produced pop track peaked at number 13 in New Zealand and reached the top 40 in several European countries. In the UK, it was released only as a promotional single due to the band’s overseas touring commitments.

== Release ==
Right Now was first released in Japan by Virgin Records on 16 March 2000. The edition includes several tracks and versions that were not re-used on subsequent incarnations of the album, including the exclusive song "Real Life", demo versions of "Cradle" and "I Want Your Love," an early version of "Whole Again" primarily featuring Katona on all verses, the final mix of "Whole Again" b-side "Holiday," and an exclusive remix of "Right Now." On 23 October 2000 Right Now was released in the United Kingdom with a modified track listing. In this version, "Holiday" and "Real Life" were replaced by "Get Real," "Turn Me On," and fourth single "Follow Me." Several tracks were also updated: new versions of "I Want Your Love," "Cradle," and "Whole Again" were recorded, with verses sung by Hamilton and McClarnon. The Japanese edition was subsequently re-released to match the UK track listing, with the addition of a bonus cover of the Monkees' hit song "Daydream Believer."

Following Katona's departure and Frost's addition to the lineup, Innocent Records commissioned a reissue of Right Now after the success of "Whole Again." In New Zealand (at least) a hybrid version was released in May 2001 with the reissue's booklet and new songs but the versions of "Right Now", "Whole Again" and other songs from the original UK version of the album and a different version of "Eternal Flame" to that on the reissue proper. The re-release was marketed worldwide and served as the band's international debut, except in Japan. Released in August 2001, this version featured a revised track order and re-recordings of songs to include Frost performing Katona's solo parts, such as on "Right Now" and "Whole Again." Some tracks such as "See Ya" and "I Want Your Love" were not re-recorded but included as bonus tracks only, while "Do What You Want" was replaced with several new songs, including "Tomorrow & Tonight," "You Are," and the re-issue's lead single "Eternal Flame." Additionally, "Bye Now" was re-recorded with new vocals from Frost, and "Cradle" received a slight remix for the reissue. A selection of tracks from Right Now and their follow-up album Feels So Good (2002) was later compiled for a 2003 United States release titled Atomic Kitten.

== Critical reception ==
Professional ratings
Review scores
| Source | Rating |
|---|---|
| AllMusic | 4/5 stars |
| MTV Asia | 2/5 stars |
| NME | (original) |
| NME | (reissue) |
| RTÉ | 1/5 stars |
| Yahoo! Music UK | 5/10 |

Right Now received generally mixed reviews from music critics. AllMusic rated the album four out of five stars. Andrew Wagstaff from British music website NME called Right Now "a fizzing pop album; unashamedly fun, funky and shot through with class. Really. It’s a belter." He found that "instead of padding out the [latter] half an hour or so with boring, boring ballads and ill-conceived cover versions, there are at least four or five [more] songs on Right Now that would make great singles [...] Atomic Kitten have scored a brilliant victory for pure pop." Yahoo! Music UK critic Chris Heath described the album as "souless pap at its worst" and wrote: "The production and overall feel of the songs is wafer thin and it sounds like a synth demo."

In a less enthusiastic review of the 2001 re-release of Right Now, Wagstaff's NME colleague Steven Wells wrote that "the fact is that Atomic Kitten have conquered the ickle girl, camp gay and dirty ole man markets and, for this week (and this week only), they are the cock-a-hoop, lustily crowing ding-dong King Kongs of Britpop. Which leaves only one (hugely irrelevant) question: is the rest of the album any frikkin’good? And the answer is (of course): No, don’t be daft. It’s shite." John Raftery, writing for RTÉ, found that "the album is a 14-track wade through the most risible, sugary mess you could ever find yourself in [...] The fact that three young women are performing it does not excuse the excruciating boredom and, frankly, disquiet, that listening to the orgasmic pleadings of these three creates [...] This album may be the first sign of the decline of Western civilisation as we know it – or just the worst record of the new millennium."

== Commercial performance ==
The original version of the album debuted at number thirty-nine on the UK Albums Chart in the week of 4 November 2000, before falling to number seventy-four in its second week. It later re-entered the chart in February 2001 for two additional weeks, bringing its total original chart run to four weeks. In August 2001, the reissue of Right Now debuted at number one on the UK Albums Chart. It spent four weeks in the top ten and continued to re-enter the chart intermittently until 2003, remaining in the UK top 100 for thirty-seven weeks. It was eventually certified platinum by the British Phonographic Industry (BPI) and has since reached double platinum status, denoting shipments of 600,000 units.

The re-issued album also performed strongly across Europe. It peaked at number four in both Denmark and Switzerland, and reached the top ten in Austria, Belgium, Ireland, and Germany. Right Now also reached number six on Billboard's European Top 100 Albums chart and topped the chart in Iceland. The album was certified gold in Denmark and Switzerland, while it also received a gold certification in Germany, indicating shipments of 150,000 units. Elsewhere, the album peaked at number twelve in New Zealand, where it was certified platinum for shipments of 15,000 units. Right Now was additionally certified gold in South Africa, representing sales of 25,000 units.

== Track listing ==
All tracks are written by Stuart Kershaw and Andy McCluskey and produced by Engine, except where noted.

Original Japan release (2000)
| No. | Title | Writer(s) | Producer(s) | Length |
|---|---|---|---|---|
| 1. | "Right Now" | | Absolute | 3:35 |
| 2. | "See Ya" | Stuart Kershaw; Andy McCluskey; Liz McClarnon | Engine; Pete Craigie; Cutfather & Joe^{[a]} | 2:52 |
| 3. | "Hippy" | | | 2:50 |
| 4. | "All The Right Things" | Kershaw; McCluskey; McClarnon; Bill Drummond; Jimmy Cauty; Ricardo Lyte; Jerome Moross | Damien Mendis; Stuart Bradbury | 3:19 |
| 5. | "Whole Again" | | | 3:19 |
| 6. | "Cradle" | Kershaw; McCluskey; Peter Strudwick | Simon Franglen | 3:18 |
| 7. | "Real Life" | Kershaw; McCluskey; Jan Carr | | 3:18 |
| 8. | "Do What You Want" | | | 3:43 |
| 9. | "Bye Now" | | Engine; Pete Cragie | 3:57 |
| 10. | "Holiday" | | Cutfather & Joe | 3:05 |
| 11. | "Strangers" | | Engine; Craige^{[b]} | 2:49 |
| 12. | "Right Now" (Dance Man remix) | | Absolute; Dance Man^{[a]} | 4:10 |

Original UK release (2000)
| No. | Title | Writer(s) | Producer(s) | Length |
|---|---|---|---|---|
| 1. | "Right Now" | | Absolute | 3:35 |
| 2. | "Follow Me" | Lucy Abbot; Sara Eker; Dawn Joseph; Steve Robson; Peter Kearney | Trevor Steel; John Holliday; Quiet Money^{[a]} | 3:15 |
| 3. | "Cradle" | Kershaw; McCluskey; Strudwick | Quiz & Larossi | 3:45 |
| 4. | "I Want Your Love" (album version) | Kershaw; McCluskey; McClarnon; Drummond; Cauty; Ricardo Lyte; Moross | Mendis; Bradbury; Engine^{[b]} | 3:15 |
| 5. | "See Ya" | Kershaw; McCluskey; McClarnon | Engine; Craigie; Cutfather & Joe^{[a]} | 2:52 |
| 6. | "Whole Again" | Kershaw; McCluskey; Bill Padley; Jem Godfrey | Engine; Padley^{[a]}; Godfrey^{[a]} | 3:03 |
| 7. | "Bye Now" | | Engine; Cragie | 3:57 |
| 8. | "Get Real" | | | 3:39 |
| 9. | "Turn Me On" | | | 3:40 |
| 10. | "Do What You Want" | | | 4:02 |
| 11. | "Hippy" | | | 2:48 |
| 12. | "Strangers" | | Engine; Craige^{[b]} | 2:44 |

Japanese bonus track
| No. | Title | Writer(s) | Producer(s) | Length |
|---|---|---|---|---|
| 13. | "Daydream Believer" | John Stewart | K-Muto | 3:07 |

UK reissue (2001)
| No. | Title | Writer(s) | Producer(s) | Length |
|---|---|---|---|---|
| 1. | "Right Now" (1) | | Absolute; Engine^{[b]} | 3:35 |
| 2. | "Follow Me" (2) | Abbot; Eker; Joseph; Robson; Kearney | Steel; Holliday; Quiet Money^{[a]} | 3:15 |
| 3. | "Whole Again" (1) | Kershaw; McCluskey; Padley; Godfrey | Engine; Padley^{[a]}; Godfrey^{[a]} | 3:05 |
| 4. | "Eternal Flame" (1) | Billy Steinberg; Tom Kelly; Susanna Hoffs | Ray Ruffin | 3:30 |
| 5. | "Tomorrow and Tonight" (1) | Kershaw; McCluskey; Ray Ruffin | Ruffin; Engine^{[b]} | 3:26 |
| 6. | "Get Real" (2) | | | 3:40 |
| 7. | "Turn Me On" (2) | | | 3:42 |
| 8. | "Hippy" (1) | | | 2:50 |
| 9. | "You Are" (1) | Steve Mac; Wayne Hector; Ali Tennant; Paul Gendler | Mac | 3:33 |
| 10. | "Cradle" (alternate mix) (2) | Kershaw; McCluskey; Strudwick | Quiz & Larossi; Ruffin^{[b]} | 3:50 |
| 11. | "Bye Now" (1) | | Engine; Spiral^{[b]} | 3:32 |
| 12. | "Strangers" (2) | | Engine; Craige^{[b]} | 2:44 |
| 13. | "See Ya" (2) | Kershaw; McCluskey; McClarnon | Engine; Craigie; Cutfather & Joe^{[a]} | 2:52 |
| 14. | "I Want Your Love" (album version) (2) | Kershaw; McCluskey; McClarnon; Drummond; Cauty; Lyte; Moross | Mendis; Bradbury; Engine^{[b]} | 3:15 |

Notes

- ^a signifies remix and additional production
- ^b signifies additional production
- ^c signifies a vocal producer
- ^{1} features vocals by Jenny Frost
- ^{2} features vocals by Kerry Katona

== Charts ==
=== Weekly charts ===
Weekly chart performance for the original version of Right Now
| Chart (2000) | Peak position |
|---|---|
| UK Albums (OCC) | 39 |

Weekly chart performance for the reissue of Right Now
| Chart (2001) | Peak position |
|---|---|
| Australian Albums (ARIA) | 86 |
| Austrian Albums (Ö3 Austria) | 8 |
| Belgian Albums (Ultratop Flanders) | 8 |
| Danish Albums (Hitlisten) | 4 |
| Dutch Albums (Album Top 100) | 44 |
| European Top 100 Albums (Billboard) | 6 |
| French Albums (SNEP) | 61 |
| German Albums (Offizielle Top 100) | 6 |
| Icelandic Albums (Tónlist) | 1 |
| Irish Albums (IRMA) | 9 |
| New Zealand Albums (RMNZ) | 12 |
| Scottish Albums (OCC) | 1 |
| Swiss Albums (Schweizer Hitparade) | 4 |
| UK Albums (OCC) | 1 |

=== Year-end charts ===
2001 year-end chart performance for Right Now
| Chart (2001) | Position |
|---|---|
| Austrian Albums (Ö3 Austria) | 48 |
| Belgian Albums (Ultratop Flanders) | 62 |
| German Albums (Offizielle Top 100) | 52 |
| Swiss Albums (Schweizer Hitparade) | 45 |
| UK Albums (OCC) | 42 |

2002 year-end chart performance for Right Now
| Chart (2002) | Position |
|---|---|
| UK Albums (OCC) | 126 |

== Certifications ==
Certifications for Right Now
| Region | Certification | Certified units/sales |
|---|---|---|
| Denmark (IFPI Danmark) | Gold | 25,000^{^} |
| Germany (BVMI) | Gold | 150,000^{^} |
| New Zealand (RMNZ) | Platinum | 15,000^{^} |
| South Africa (RISA) | Gold | 25,000^{*} |
| Switzerland (IFPI Switzerland) | Gold | 25,000^{^} |
| United Kingdom (BPI) | 2× Platinum | 600,000^{^} |
^{*} Sales figures based on certification alone.^{^} Shipments figures based on certification alone.

== Release history ==
Right Now release history
| Region | Date | Edition | Label |
|---|---|---|---|
| Japan | 16 March 2000 | Original | Virgin |
| United Kingdom | 23 October 2000 | Original | Innocent; Virgin |
| Worldwide | 6 August 2001 | Re-issue | Innocent; Virgin |
