= Follow Me (Atomic Kitten song) =

2000 song by Atomic Kitten

Single by Atomic Kitten

from the album Right Now
- B-side: "Don't Tell Me Now"; "Real Life"
- Released: 9 October 2000
- Studio: Motor Museum
- Length: 3:21
- Label: Virgin; Innocent
- Songwriters: Lucy Abbot; Sara Eker; Dawn Joseph; Steve Robson; Peter Kearney
- Producers: Trevor Steel; John Holliday

Atomic Kitten singles chronology
"I Want Your Love" (2000)	"Follow Me" (2000)	"Whole Again" (2001)

Music video
- "Follow Me" on YouTube

"Follow Me" is a song by British girl group Atomic Kitten. It was written by Lucy Abbot, Sara Eker, Dawn Joseph, Steve Robson, and Peter Kearney for their debut album, Right Now (2000), with production helmed by Trevor Steel, John Holliday, and additional producer Quiet Money. "Follow Me" was released as the album's fourth single in October 2000. A departure from the bubblegum pop of Atomic Kitten's first three singles, it introduced a more mature and mellow, R&B-influenced pop sound but was less successful than their previous top 10 hits, peaking at number 20 on the UK Singles Chart.

== Music video ==
The video for "Follow Me" was filmed on 18 July 2000 and includes Natasha Hamilton, Liz McClarnon and Kerry Katona. It opens with the Kittens near a window in a shadowy room. Before the first chorus the girls are seen in a desert with a pink sky. In the first chorus, the three dance on a disco ball dome in the sky in the clouds. The girls also dance on top of a skyscraper in the city at night, while the skyline is full of old buildings. The roof the girls dance on features a large tattoo-like design. During the bridge section, the Kittens dance in front of a blue cover. The girls also clap their hands with snowballs in the desert setting at night. Before the final chorus, the blue cover lifts up behind Natasha, Kerry and Liz.

== Track listings ==
UK CD1
No.	Title	Writer(s)	Producer(s)	Length
1.	"Follow Me" (radio mix)	Lucy Abbot; Sara Eker; Dawn Joseph; Steve Robson; Peter Kearney	Trevor Steel; John Holliday; Quiet Money^{[a]}	3:21
2.	"Don't Tell Me Now"	Liz McClarnon; David Garnish	Garnish	3:09
3.	"Follow Me" (Solaris classic disco mix)	Abbot; Eker; Joseph; Robson; Kearney	Steel; Holliday; Money^{[a]}; Solaris^{[a]}	8:08
4.	"Follow Me" (music video)

UK CD2
No.	Title	Writer(s)	Producer(s)	Length
1.	"Follow Me" (radio edit)	Abbot; Eker; Joseph; Robson; Kearney	Steel; Holliday; Money^{[a]}	3:21
2.	"Real Life"	Stuart Kershaw; Andy McCluskey; Jan Carr	Engine	3:15
3.	"Follow Me" (Stella Browne club mix)	Abbot; Eker; Joseph; Robson; Kearney	Steel; Holliday; Money^{[a]}; Stella Browne^{[a]}	6:36

UK cassette single
No.	Title	Writer(s)	Producer(s)	Length
1.	"Follow Me" (radio edit)	Abbot; Eker; Joseph; Robson; Kearney	Steel; Holliday; Money^{[a]}	3:21
2.	"Follow Me" (Solaris radio edit)	Abbot; Eker; Joseph; Robson; Kearney	Steel; Holliday; Money^{[a]}; Solaris^{[a]}	3:26
3.	"Follow Me" (Stella Browne radio edit)	Abbot; Eker; Joseph; Robson; Kearney	Steel; Holliday; Money^{[a]}; Stella Browne^{[a]}	3:34
4.	"Follow Me" (G-A-Y mix)	Abbot; Eker; Joseph; Robson; Kearney	Steel; Holliday; Money^{[a]}; Mark Andrews^{[a]}	7:35

Notes

- ^a signifies remix and additional production

== Credits and personnel ==
Credits adapted from the liner notes of Right Now.

- Tracy Ackerman – backing vocals
- Atomic Kitten – lead vocals
- Lucy Abbot – writing
- Sara Eker – writing
- Danny G – keyboards
- John Holliday – production
- Mark Jamies – guitar
- Dawn Joseph – writing
- Peter Kearney – writing
- Quiet Money – additional production, remix
- Heff Moraes – mixing
- Jackie Rawe – backing vocals
- Steve Robson – writing
- Trevor Steel – production

== Charts ==
Chart (2000)	Peak position
Europe (Eurochart Hot 100)	81
Scotland Singles (OCC)	15
UK Singles (OCC)	20
