= Right Now (Atomic Kitten song) =

1999 single by Atomic Kitten

Single by Atomic Kitten

from the album Right Now
- B-side: "Something Spooky"
- Released: 29 November 1999
- Studio: Motor Museum (Liverpool, England); Olympic (London, England)
- Genre: Disco
- Length: 3:35
- Label: Innocent; Virgin
- Songwriters: Stuart Kershaw; Andy McCluskey
- Producer: Absolute

Atomic Kitten singles chronology
"Right Now" (1999)	"See Ya" (2000)

Music video
- "Right Now" on YouTube

"Right Now" is a song by the English girl group Atomic Kitten from their first album, Right Now (2000). Released as the group's debut single in November 1999, the song was re-recorded twice: once for the album's 2001 re-issue with new member Jenny Frost and again in 2004 for the group's Greatest Hits album. The 2004 version, titled "Right Now 2004", proved to be a greater international chart success. The song was written by Atomic Kitten founders and Orchestral Manoeuvres in the Dark members Andy McCluskey and Stuart Kershaw.

== Release ==
The single was released on 29 November 1999. "Right Now" stayed in the British charts for 11 weeks, reaching number 10. In Belgium, the song peaked at number 17, charting for eight weeks. In Oceania, "Right Now" peaked at 40 in New Zealand and 72 in Australia.

== Music video ==
The video for the original 1999 release opens with workmen assembling the tiled dancefloor inside the studio. It shows Atomic Kitten walking through Liverpool wearing wet and shiny jackets, in a baker's shop, down in a lift in a department store, getting in a car, and on an open top double decker bus. This video includes the shots of Natasha Hamilton, Liz McClarnon, and Kerry Katona in three tunnels at a time (red, white and blue). During the first chorus, the group members and dancers dance on the multi-coloured tiled dancefloor with holes to the tunnels, radio speakers at the side, and a green ramp.

== Track listings ==
UK CD1

1. "Right Now" (radio edit) – 3:28
2. "Right Now" (Solomon pop mix) – 5:50
3. "Right Now" (K-Klass Phazerphunk radio edit) – 3:32
4. "Right Now" (video) – 3:37

UK CD2

1. "Right Now" (radio edit) – 3:28
2. "Something Spooky" (theme to BBC's Belfry Witches) – 2:40
3. "Right Now" (original demo) – 3:36

UK cassette single

1. "Right Now" (radio edit) – 3:28
2. "Something Spooky" (theme to BBC's Belfry Witches) – 2:40
3. Exclusive interview – 7:35

European CD single

1. "Right Now" (radio edit) – 3:28
2. "Something Spooky" (theme to BBC's Belfry Witches) – 2:40

Japanese CD single

1. "Right Now" (radio edit)
2. "Right Now" (Solomon pop mix)
3. "Right Now" (K-Klass Phazerphunk radio edit)
4. "Something Spooky" (theme to BBC's Belfry Witches)

Australian CD single (2001)

1. "Right Now" – 3:35
2. "Eternal Flame" – 3:15
3. "Right Now" (K-Klass Phazerfunk club mix) – 7:22
4. "Eternal Flame" (Blacksmith RnB dub) – 3:55
5. "Eternal Flame" (video) – 3:10

== Credits and personnel ==
Credits are lifted from the UK CD1 liner notes and the Right Now album booklet.

Studios

- Recorded at Motor Museum Studios (Liverpool, England) and Olympic Studios (London, England)
- Original version mastered at The Town House (London, England)
- 2001 version mastered at Whitfield St Studios (London, England)

Personnel

- Stuart Kershaw – writing
- Andy McCluskey – writing
- Atomic Kitten – vocals
- Tracy Ackerman – backing vocals
- Tracy Carmen – backing vocals
- Engine – all instruments, vocal production
- Milton McDonald – additional guitar
- Isobel Griffiths – strings
- Nick Ingman – string arrangement and conductor
- Absolute – production
- Steven Fitzmaurice – mixing
- Pete Craigie – vocal mixing
- Pat O'Shaughnessy – vocal engineering
- John Davis – mastering (2001)
- Form – artwork design
- Rankin – photography
- Graham Rounthwaite – illustration

== Charts ==
=== Weekly charts ===
Chart (1999–2000)	Peak position
Australia (ARIA)	72
Belgium (Ultratop 50 Flanders)	17
Estonia (Eesti Top 20)	5
Europe (Eurochart Hot 100)	48
New Zealand (Recorded Music NZ)	40
Scottish Singles Sales (Official Charts)	11
UK Singles (Official Charts)	10
UK Airplay (Music Week)	32

Chart (2001)	Peak position
Australia (ARIA) with "Eternal Flame"	47

=== Year-end charts ===
Chart (1999)	Position
UK Singles (OCC)	193

== Release history ==
Region	Version	Date	Format(s)	Label(s)	Ref.
United Kingdom	"Right Now"	29 November 1999	CD	Innocent; Virgin	
Australia	"Right Now"	7 February 2000	CD	Innocent; Virgin	
Japan	"Right Now"	23 February 2000	CD	Virgin	
New Zealand	"Right Now"	6 March 2000	CD; cassette	Innocent; Virgin	
Australia	"Right Now" / "Eternal Flame"	17 September 2001	CD	Innocent; Virgin	

== 2004 version ==
"Right Now 2004"

Single by Atomic Kitten

from the album Greatest Hits
- A-side: "Someone like Me"
- B-side: "Wild"
- Released: 29 March 2004
- Genre: Dance-pop
- Length: 3:45
- Label: Virgin
- Songwriters: Stuart Kershaw; Andy McCluskey
- Producers: Ash Howes; Martin Harrington

Atomic Kitten singles chronology
"Ladies' Night" (2003)	"Someone like Me" / "Right Now 2004" (2004)	"Cradle" (2005)

Audio video
- "Right Now 2004" on YouTube

In 2004, as Atomic Kitten decided to take a break, they released one more single to say goodbye. It was the double-A side "Someone like Me" / "Right Now 2004". The remix is exclusive on the group's 2004 Greatest Hits album. While the original version was a 1990s disco-pop song, the 2004 version is more in the vein of early 2000s dance songs.

=== Chart performance ===
"Someone like Me" / "Right Now 2004" achieved a better position on the UK Singles Chart than the original release of "Right Now", peaking at number eight, and reached the top 20 in Ireland. It was the group's lowest charting single in Germany, peaking at number 67, and in Switzerland, reaching number 42. In the Netherlands, it was their second-lowest-charting single, behind "Love Doesn't Have to Hurt".

=== Music video ===
The video accompanying the 2004 re-recording shows Hamilton, McClarnon, and Jenny Frost rehearsing and performing a concert, intercut with backstage footage and glimpses of press conferences, holidays, and television appearances.

=== Track listings ===
UK CD1

1. "Someone like Me" – 2:05
2. "Right Now 2004" – 3:45

UK CD2

1. "Right Now 2004" – 3:45
2. "Someone like Me" – 2:05
3. "Wild" – 3:42
4. "Right Now 2004" (video) – 3:45

European CD single

1. "Right Now 2004" – 3:45
2. "Someone like Me" – 2:05

European maxi-CD single

1. "Right Now 2004" – 3:45
2. "Someone like Me" – 2:05
3. "Wild" – 3:42

=== Personnel ===
- Natasha Hamilton – co-lead vocals
- Liz McClarnon – co-lead vocals
- Jenny Frost – co-lead vocals

=== Charts ===
All entries charted with "Someone like Me" except where noted.

Chart (2004)	Peak position
Belgium (Ultratip Bubbling Under Flanders)	8
Germany (GfK) "Right Now 2004" only	67
Hungary (Rádiós Top 40) "Right Now 2004" only	40
Ireland (IRMA)	18
Netherlands (Single Top 100)	52
Scottish Singles Sales (Official Charts)	6
Switzerland (Schweizer Hitparade)	42
UK Singles (Official Charts)	8
