= I Want Your Love (Atomic Kitten song) =

2000 single by Atomic Kitten

Single by Atomic Kitten

from the album Right Now
- Released: 3 July 2000
- Studio: Motor Museum (Liverpool, England)
- Genre: Disco
- Length: 3:16
- Label: Innocent; Virgin
- Songwriters: Andy McCluskey; Bill Drummond; Liz McClarnon; Jerome Moross; Jimmy Cauty; Ricardo Lyte; Stuart Kershaw
- Producers: Damien Mendis, Stuart Bradbury

Atomic Kitten singles chronology
"See Ya" (2000)	"I Want Your Love" (2000)	"Follow Me" (2000)

Audio video
- "I Want Your Love" on YouTube

"I Want Your Love" is a song by the English girl group Atomic Kitten, released as the third single from their debut album, Right Now (2000). Atomic Kitten co-founders Andy McCluskey and Stuart Kershaw (of the band OMD) served as co-writers on the track. The song samples the theme to the 1958 film The Big Country, and it was produced, arranged, recorded, and mixed by Damien Mendis at Metropolis Studios in London.

Released on 3 July 2000, "I Want Your Love" peaked at number 10 on the UK Singles Chart and number 48 in Ireland. Initial copies of the singles also contained a sample of the KLF's 1991 hit single "Justified & Ancient", but later copies had the sample removed. In 2004, "I Want Your Love" was included on Atomic Kitten's The Greatest Hits compilation.

== Music video ==
The video for the song was inspired by David Bowie's debut hit "Space Oddity". It opens with the doors opening in three rooms on a planet (red, yellow, and blue). Natasha Hamilton is in a red room on a bed, Liz McClarnon is in a blue room lying on the blue wall and Kerry Katona is in a yellow room sitting by a soft teddy bear. Shots in chorus one has three women dancing on a planet on a circle in the middle. During the bridge section, the Kittens are in the middle of a circle on a planet with three men, and they make a sound effect by moving their arms. In the bridge and the final chorus, the three girls and other dancers dance on a big circle on a planet. An alternate version of the music video shows clips from the 2000 film Titan A.E..

== Track listings ==
UK CD1

1. "I Want Your Love" (2XS radio mix) – 3:15
2. "I Want Your Love" (Q's Detonator alternative radio mix) – 3:30
3. "I Want Your Love" (video) – 3:36

UK CD2

1. "I Want Your Love" (2XS radio mix) – 3:15
2. "I Want Your Love" (Sleaze Sisters Anthem mix) – 7:08
3. "I Want Your Love" (Ricochet's Monolith mix) – 9:29

UK cassette single

A1. "I Want Your Love" (2XS radio mix) – 3:15
A2. "I Want Your Love" (Maximum Q Atom Bomb mix) – 6:14
B1. "I Want Your Love" (Q's Detonator alternative radio mix) – 3:30
B2. "I Want Your Love" (Frankie Constantinou disco mix) – 6:55

== Credits and personnel ==
Credits are lifted from the UK CD1 liner notes and the Right Now liner notes.

Studios

- Recorded at Motor Museum Studios (Liverpool, England)
- Mixed at Studio One (United Kingdom)

Personnel

- Stuart Kershaw – writing
- Andy McCluskey – writing
- Liz McClarnon – writing
- Bill Drummond – writing
- Jimmy Cauty – writing
- Ricardo Lyte – writing
- Jerome Moross – writing
- Atomic Kitten – vocals
- Rita Campbell – backing vocals
- 2XS – all instruments, mixing
  - Damien Mendis – radio mix production, vocal production
  - Stuart Bradbury – radio mix production, vocal production, vocal engineering, recording and mix engineering
- Engine – radio mix vocal production, Q's Detonator production
- Pete Craigie – radio mix vocal engineering, Q's Detonator engineering
- Pat O'Shaughnessy – radio mix vocal engineering, Q's Detonator engineering
- Ricochet – Q's Detonator additional production and remix

== Charts ==
Chart (2000)	Peak position
Europe (Eurochart Hot 100)	43
Ireland (IRMA)	48
Scottish Singles Sales (Official Charts)	7
UK Singles (Official Charts)	10
