= See Ya (Atomic Kitten song) =

2000 single by Atomic Kitten

Single by Atomic Kitten

from the album Right Now
- Released: 27 March 2000
- Studio: Motor Museum (Liverpool, England)
- Genre: Disco
- Length: 2:52
- Label: Innocent; Virgin
- Songwriters: Stuart Kershaw; Andy McCluskey; Liz McClarnon
- Producers: Engine; Pete Craigie; Cutfather & Joe (radio mix)

Atomic Kitten singles chronology
| "Right Now" (1999) | "See Ya" (2000) | "I Want Your Love" (2000) |

Music video
- "See Ya" on YouTube

"See Ya" is a song by the English girl group Atomic Kitten, released as the second single from their debut album, Right Now (2000). The song was written by Atomic Kitten founders Stuart Kershaw and Andy McCluskey (of the band OMD), along with group member Liz McClarnon. It was produced by Engine and Pete Craigie, with the radio mix receiving production from Cutfather & Joe. The single peaked at number six on the UK Singles Chart, reached number 50 in Ireland, and was a minor hit in the Flanders region of Belgium.

== Track listings ==
UK CD1

1. "See Ya" (radio mix) – 2:52
2. "See Ya" (The Progress Boy Wunda edit) – 3:14
3. "See Ya" (Sleaze Sisters Anthem mix) – 6:23
4. "See Ya" (video) – 2:51

UK CD2

1. "See Ya" – 2:52
2. "See Ya" (Kitty Karaoke version) – 2:52
3. Interview with Atomic Kitten – 6:46

UK cassette single

1. "See Ya" – 2:52
2. "See Ya" (Sizzling Danish mix) – 3:16
3. "See Ya" (Solomon Paradise mix) – 5:38

European CD single

1. "See Ya" (radio mix) – 2:52
2. "See Ya" (Sleaze Sisters Anthem mix) – 6:23

== Credits and personnel ==
Credits are lifted from the UK CD1 liner notes and the Right Now album booklet.

Studios

- Recorded at Motor Museum Studios (Liverpool, England)
- Radio mix recorded at C & J Studios (Copenhagen, Denmark)
- Mixed at Stanley House Studios (London, England)

Personnel

- Stuart Kershaw – writing, guitar, keys and programming
- Andy McCluskey – writing, keys and programming
- Liz McClarnon – writing
- Atomic Kitten – vocals
- Jonas Krag – guitar
- Isobel Griffiths – strings
- Mich Hedin Hansen – percussion
- Engine – original production, original engineering
- Pete Craigie – original production
- Pat O'Shaughnessy – original engineering
- Nick Ingman – string arrangement and conductor
- Cutfather & Joe – radio mix production
- Mads Nilsson – radio mix engineering
- Joe Belmaati – radio mix keys and programming

== Charts ==
=== Weekly charts ===
| Chart (2000) | Peak position |
|---|---|
| Belgium (Ultratip Bubbling Under Flanders) | 13 |
| Europe (Eurochart Hot 100) | 31 |
| Ireland (IRMA) | 50 |
| Scottish Singles Sales (Official Charts) | 5 |
| UK Singles (Official Charts) | 6 |

=== Year-end charts ===
| Chart (2000) | Position |
|---|---|
| UK Singles (OCC) | 185 |
