= Atomic Kitten =

British girl group

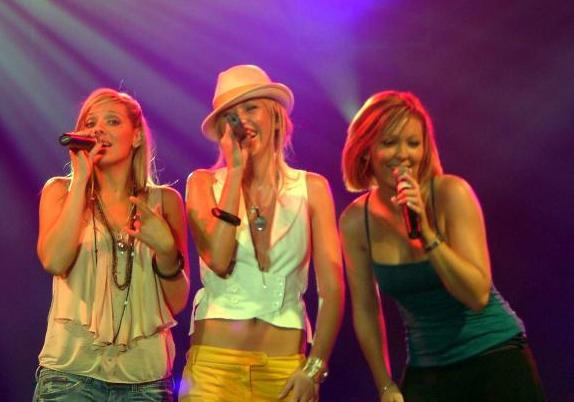
- Atomic Kitten in 2005 (L–R): Liz McClarnon, Jenny Frost and Natasha Hamilton

Background information
- Origin: Liverpool, England
- Genres: Pop; dance-pop; Europop; disco; adult contemporary
- Years active: 1998–2008; 2012–2024
- Labels: Columbia; EMI; Innocent; Virgin
- Spinoff of: OMD
- Past members: Kerry Katona; Liz McClarnon; Natasha Hamilton; Jenny Frost
- Website: Official website

Atomic Kitten were an English girl group formed in Liverpool in 1998, whose original lineup comprised Kerry Katona, Liz McClarnon, and Natasha Hamilton. The group was founded by Orchestral Manoeuvres in the Dark (OMD) members Andy McCluskey and Stuart Kershaw, who served as principal songwriters during Atomic Kitten's early years. The group's debut album Right Now was released in October 2000 and charted at number 39 in the United Kingdom. After five top ten singles, original member Katona quit – four weeks before "Whole Again" reached number one in the UK Singles Chart – and was replaced by former Precious singer Jenny Frost. "Whole Again" became the group's most successful single, staying at number one for four weeks in the UK and six weeks in Germany, and reaching number one in many other territories; in Britain, it was the 13th-best-selling single of the 2000s. The group re-released their debut album, with some tracks re-recorded with Frost's vocals: it peaked at number one in the UK and was certified double platinum after selling more than 600,000 copies.

Between 2002 and 2004, the group released a further two studio albums, Feels So Good (which also went double platinum in the UK) and Ladies Night, along with a greatest hits album, before announcing a break following their 2004 tour. To date the group have had three UK number-one singles: "Whole Again", the fourth-best-selling song of all time by a girl group in the UK; "Eternal Flame", a song originally recorded by the Bangles; and "The Tide Is High (Get the Feeling)", a song originally recorded by the Paragons. They have sold more than 10 million records worldwide.

After making sporadic appearances from 2005 to 2008, it was announced that McClarnon, Hamilton, and Katona would reunite for the ITV2 series The Big Reunion, alongside five other pop groups of their time: B*Witched, Five, Liberty X, Honeyz and 911. Frost was unable to take part in the comeback because of her pregnancy. Katona left the group for a second time in December 2017. Frost returned in 2021 for a brief stint before leaving again a few months later. Hamilton announced her departure from the group in October 2024 to concentrate on solo projects.

== History ==
=== 1998–2001: Formation, Right Now and Katona's first departure ===
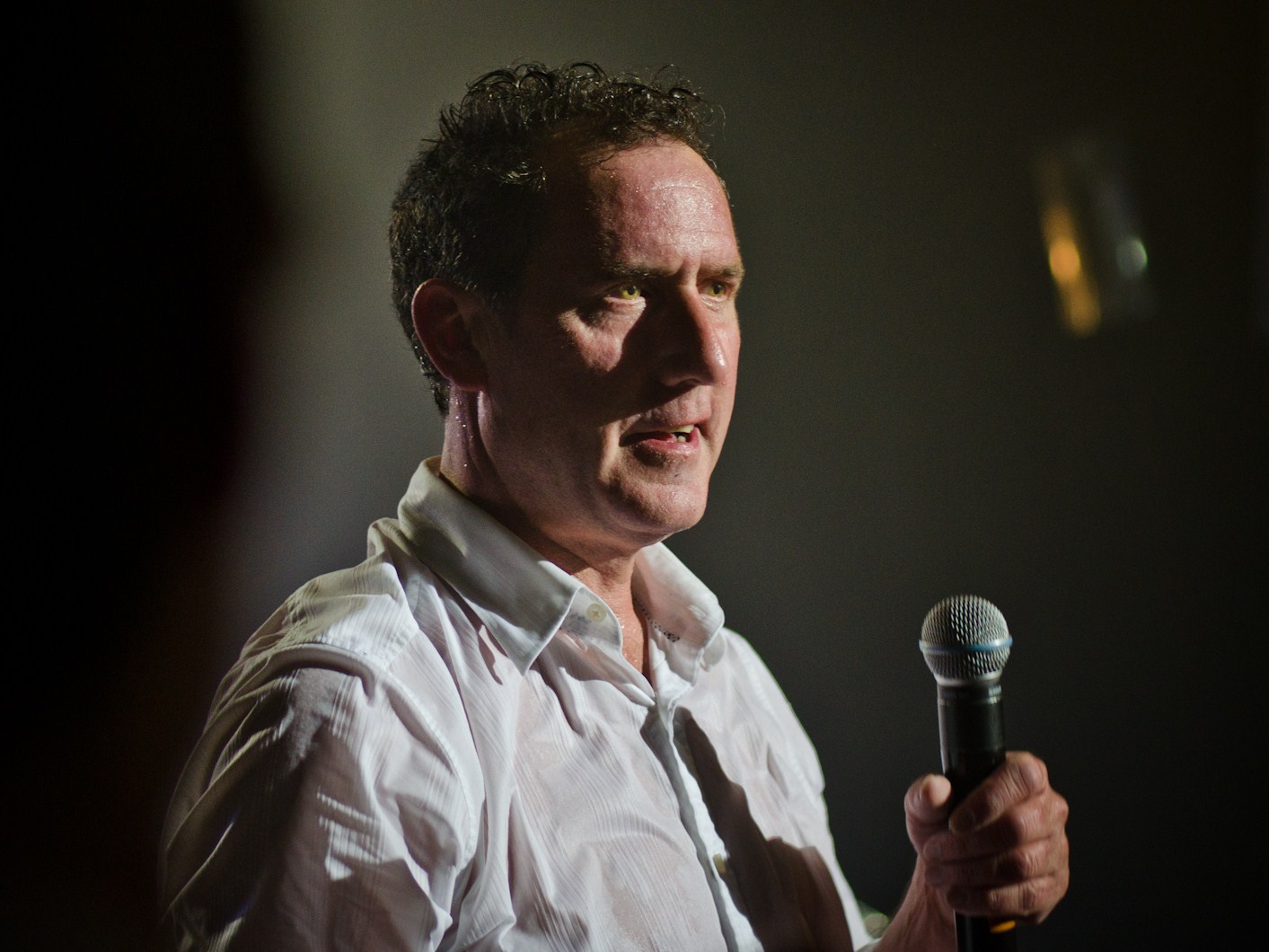
Atomic Kitten co-founder Andy McCluskey performing with OMD in 2011

The idea of Atomic Kitten was first conceived in 1998 by English musician Andy McCluskey, best known as the frontman of new wave group OMD. Karl Bartos of Kraftwerk suggested he create a new band as a vehicle for his songs following the 1996 dissolution of OMD, who had been rendered unfashionable by the prevalence of grunge and indie rock. McCluskey founded Atomic Kitten alongside fellow OMD member Stuart Kershaw, and the pair would serve as principal songwriters on the group's studio recordings in the late 1990s and early 2000s.

The lineup initially featured Liz McClarnon, Kerry Katona, and Heidi Range, but did not have a name. In her autobiography Too Much, Too Young: My Story of Love, Survival and Celebrity, Katona mentions that they pondered names such as Exit and Honeyheads, before settling on Automatic Kitten, the name of a fashion label owned by designer Mary Lamb. When Katona went home to tell her mother about the band, her mother's friend was unable to pronounce "Automatic Kitten" and kept saying "Atomic Kitten". Katona liked the name and told her bandmates about it; they all felt the same way and the name stuck. After 8 months of being in the group, Range later quit after being offered a different record deal, and was replaced by Natasha Hamilton in May 1999. Range went on to have success with another girl group, the Sugababes.

The group's debut single, "Right Now", was released in late November 1999 and reached number ten on the UK Singles Chart. "See Ya" followed in March 2000 and reached number six. Following this initial success, Atomic Kitten performed an Asian tour and achieved their first number-one hit in Asia with "Cradle". In 2000 they recorded a cover of "The Loco-Motion" for the movie Thomas and the Magic Railroad. The album, also titled Right Now, was first released in Japan on 16 March 2000 and released in the United Kingdom on 23 October 2000 following the release of two further singles, "I Want Your Love" and "Follow Me", with a slightly modified tracklist. The album's Japanese edition included demo versions of "Cradle", "I Want Your Love" (titled "All the Right Things"), "Whole Again" (which has only Katona speaking all the verses in the song, while Hamilton and McClarnon sing the chorus), and a rare remix of "Right Now".

In Europe, the album was unsuccessful upon its first release, peaking at number 39 on the UK Albums Chart. There were no initial plans to focus on the global market and Atomic Kitten's label, Innocent Records, was even considering dropping them because of their limited success. However, the record company was persuaded to let the group release one more single from the album. That single, "Whole Again", became their first number-one hit in the United Kingdom and stayed at the top for four consecutive weeks. Due to this success, "Whole Again" was released globally, and reached number one in 18 other countries, including 6 weeks in Germany and New Zealand. The song and video for "Whole Again" originally featured Katona (her vocals were also in "Hippy" and "Get Real"), but several days before the single's release, she left because of her pregnancy. Former Precious singer Jenny Frost replaced her in the line-up and the single's music video was re-shot; a US video for "Whole Again" was also released. The Katona–Frost switch led to the decision to partially re-record and re-release the Right Now album which then went to number one in the UK in August 2001, and was certified double Platinum. The album also reached the Top 10 in several European countries, including Germany and Denmark. Atomic Kitten's first album was repackaged with 3 brand-new tracks: "Eternal Flame" (a cover of the Bangles' 1989 hit), "Tomorrow & Tonight", and "You Are", and includes vocals from Frost in "Right Now", "Whole Again", "Hippy", and a re-recorded version of "Bye Now".

Their next single, "Eternal Flame", became their second number-one single in the UK and New Zealand and is featured in the film The Parole Officer and the So Far So Good DVD. It became their biggest single in France—peaking at number two—and eventually went Gold. In late 2001, the band announced they would be releasing a final single from the repackaged album, "You Are". A video was recorded and promo singles were sent out to radio, but the single was ultimately shelved, never getting a full commercial release. That same year, "Right Now" was featured in Konami's hit arcade videogame, Dance Dance Revolution 5th MIX.

=== 2002–2003: New lineup, Feels So Good and international breakthrough ===
Following the success of Right Now, a new album, Feels So Good, was recorded. The songwriting and production agreement with Andy McCluskey and Stuart Kershaw was an increasing source of tension within the group, and the pair departed during the recording of the album, frustrated with the record company's insistence on producing songs similar to "Whole Again". Released tracks from Feels So Good were "It's OK", "The Tide Is High (Get the Feeling)", "The Last Goodbye", "Love Doesn't Have to Hurt", and "Be With You". The title track was written by Steve Anderson and Kylie Minogue. "The Last Goodbye" was released as a double A-side with "Be With You", which was later added to an Argentinian special edition of Feels So Good and added to their third album, Ladies Night.

The first single, "It's OK", peaked at number three in the United Kingdom. The next single was "The Tide Is High (Get the Feeling)", a remake of the 1967 song by the Paragons that Blondie covered in 1980, which gave the group their third number-one single in the UK and New Zealand. In April 2002, Hamilton announced that she was pregnant but opted to continue with the promotion before going on maternity leave, which included the scheduled 2002 tour, the "Tide is High (Get the Feeling)" video, and a "Feels So Good" medley at Party in the Park. The band sponsored a team in the British Touring Car Championship.

During January and February 2003, Atomic Kitten toured Southeast Asia, visiting Singapore, Thailand, and Korea. Hamilton, who had given birth to her son Josh on 24 August 2002, brought him on the tour.

=== 2003–2008: Ladies Night, Greatest Hits and hiatus ===
In April 2003, the album Atomic Kitten was released in the United States, which consisted of tracks from their first two albums. The album was unsuccessful, although "The Tide Is High (Get the Feeling)" appeared on the soundtrack for the feature film, The Lizzie McGuire Movie. Following this, the group opted to focus solely on the European, Oceanian, South African and Asian markets.

Before recording their third album, Kool & the Gang approached the group about a collaboration for their album of duets, The Hits: Reloaded. Kool & the Gang wanted to record an updated version of their hit "Ladies Night" and were looking for a girl group to sing the lyrics. Atomic Kitten liked the idea and inquired whether they could use it for their next album which was subsequently named Ladies Night in honour of this collaboration. After mainly relying on songwriters for their previous two albums, the group took significant creative control, co-writing eight of the fifteen songs. Ladies Night was released on 10 November 2003 and peaked at number five in the UK album chart. It was certified Platinum for sales in excess of 300,000 copies. The album included three UK top 10 singles; "Ladies Night", "If You Come To Me" and "Someone like Me".

In March 2004, the group released the double A-side single "Someone like Me"/"Right Now 2004", and embarked on their Greatest Hits Tour to support the Ladies Night album and the upcoming release of their Greatest Hits album. Shortly before the tour began, the group announced they would be taking an extended break after the completion of the tour, which would serve as a "goodbye" to their fans. The tour's final concert was released on DVD under the title The Greatest Hits Live at Wembley Arena on 19 April 2004. During the group's appearance on The Big Reunion, Hamilton revealed that she had decided to quit the group under the pressure of being a new mum and touring, having only been diagnosed with postnatal depression only nine months after she gave birth. This later led to the group's hiatus because they did not want to replace Hamilton.

On Valentine's Day 2005, a partially re-recorded version of "Cradle" from their debut album Right Now with new vocals from McClarnon and Frost, titled "Cradle 2005", was released as a charity single, with proceeds going to World Vision. It was later included on a remix compilation titled Access All Areas: Remixed & B-Sides, which was released in Asia in July that year packaged with the Greatest Hits Live DVD. Around the same time, the group were featured on the soundtrack of Disney's Mulan II with the song "(I Wanna Be) Like Other Girls". They also performed together in Kraków on 28 August at the Coca-Cola SoundWave Festival. In 2006, they released a cover version of the Farm song "All Together Now". It became a charity single for the 2006 FIFA World Cup and was released only in German-speaking countries. It peaked inside the German Top 20. The group performed at the Nokia New Year's Eve Music Festival in Hong Kong on 31 December 2006.

They once again reunited to perform at the Number One Project at the Liverpool Echo Arena on 19 January 2008, which celebrated Liverpool's year as European Capital of Culture and the fact that Liverpudlian artists have had a collective 56 UK number-one singles. Also to mark the event, in the same month the group released a cover of "Anyone Who Had a Heart", which peaked at number 78 on the UK Singles Chart. The group also performed at the Kings Lynn Festival on 12 July 2008 and at Haydock Park in Liverpool on 19 July 2008.

=== 2012–2013: Return and The Big Reunion ===
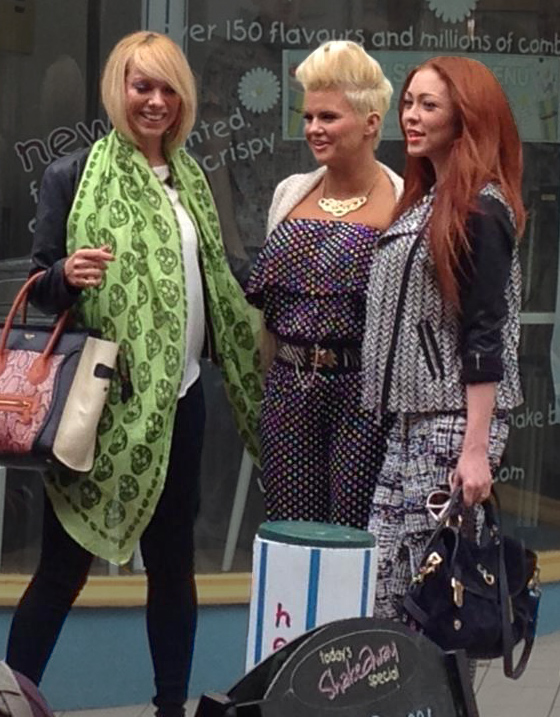
Atomic Kitten in 2013

In March 2012, Hamilton confirmed that the group were reuniting for a summer tour and were in talks to star in their own reality television show regarding the comeback, following on the success of the 2011 Steps reunion and reality show. She also said that she hoped Katona would join her, McClarnon and Frost on stage for a performance, having quit the group 11 years earlier. The reunion was later dismissed by all members due to the tension between Katona and Frost. However, on 18 October 2012, it was announced that the 1999 line-up of Atomic Kitten (McClarnon, Katona, and Hamilton) would reunite for an ITV2 series, The Big Reunion, along with five other pop groups of their time: 911, Honeyz, B*Witched, Five and Liberty X. Frost had been involved in the early meetings to reform the group, but declined to rejoin due to her pregnancy. In 2015, she expressed dissatisfaction with how the reunion was handled, which left her estranged from both Hamilton and McClarnon.

The groups in The Big Reunion, including Atomic Kitten, were originally supposed to perform a one-off comeback concert at the Hammersmith Apollo in London. Atomic Kitten's setlist for the Hammersmith Apollo concert consisted of "Right Now", "The Tide Is High (Get the Feeling)", and "Whole Again". It was confirmed on 11 February that due to high ticket demands and the popularity of the series, a UK arena tour would take place from 3 to 14 May 2013. Two more dates were later added for 16 and 17 May, taking the tour total to 14 shows.

Due to the massive success of The Big Reunion, it was announced that the reunited groups would also be going on a "Christmas party tour" in December 2013. In December 2013, Atomic Kitten recorded their first new material in ten years when, along with the other groups from the show, they recorded a Christmas charity single for Text Santa, a cover of Wizzard's "I Wish It Could Be Christmas Everyday". The song peaked at number 13 in the UK.

=== 2013–2019: Touring and Katona's second departure ===
On 17 February 2013, Atomic Kitten made an appearance on The Alan Titchmarsh Show in which Katona announced that the group had signed a deal to release their own perfume fragrance. Hamilton later added that they would be releasing new material, saying: "We've already been in the studio, we want to write some more music, so it's all very exciting." On 14 March, Hamilton confirmed yet again that the group would release new material, saying "There is definitely going to be a single and there will be an album, hopefully". Also speaking about their fragrance deal, she added: 'We have got a perfume deal – we are going to be releasing our own Atomic Kitten fragrance. "Right Now", "The Tide Is High" and "Whole Again" are taken from The Big Reunion Album. It's going to be three different smells to represent the three of us. Fans will get the three in one packet. We went to the company's offices and created our fragrances.' At the Health Lottery champagne tea at Claridge's in London, Hamilton spoke of a potential comeback single: "We actually recorded our new single last night. We've literally just done it. I got out of the studio at 11 pm and I couldn't stop singing the song. I couldn't get to sleep - I was in bed, singing! It's modern so we've progressed. That's all I can say right now. If there's a single, there's definitely going to be an album."

Following the announcement of Katona's pregnancy, the group confirmed that they were unsure of the group's future, or if any new material would be released. McClarnon announced on 6 April that Atomic Kitten would be touring with East 17 and All Saints and others in November 2014. The next week it was announced that unforeseen circumstances had cancelled the tour.

In November 2014, Katona said the group would release a new album in 2015, which would go back to their original "cheesy pop sound" and tour it "around the world". The group's planned '15: The Greatest Hits' tour was canceled in mid-May 2015 with no announcement as to why. In November 2015, the group released a compilation album entitled Whole Again – The Best of Atomic Kitten.

In late 2016, Liberty X's Michelle Heaton filled in for McClarnon during the group's international gigs as McClarnon has a debilitating fear of flying.

On 12 November 2016, Katona, Hamilton, and McClarnon performed at the Pigs Nose Inn, a small live music venue in South Devon known for attracting high-profile acts. Atomic Kitten chose to perform a prelude to their tour in 2017. Atomic Kitten toured Australia and New Zealand alongside B*Witched, S Club 3, East 17 and Liberty X in February 2017 with Heaton once again filling in for McClarnon.

In November 2017, Katona stated on her social media accounts that she was no longer a part of the group. Hamilton and McClarnon continued to perform as a duo.

=== 2020–2024: Other projects ===
In June 2020, Frost joined Hamilton and McClarnon for an online interview as part of "Life Stories – The Interview Series" hosted by therapist Lisa Johnson and Hamilton herself. The band discussed their time together and the impact being in a girl band had on their individual mental health.

On 6 July 2021, the group released a remake of "Whole Again" in support of England at UEFA Euro 2020, entitled "Southgate You're the One (Football's Coming Home Again)". Frost returned to the band for the first time since 2008 for a single release. They said: "It's been a whirlwind couple of days, but we are super excited and grateful to be able to contribute to the awesome energy and patriotism that is filling the England streets with this version of Whole Again. Totally inspired by the England football fans in support of Gareth Southgate and the super talented England football team, we will be singing loud and proud 'Football's coming home'." On 29 November 2021, the group said that Frost was returning to the group full-time.

By 2022, McClarnon and Hamilton had continued performing as a duo.

On 7 May 2023, McClarnon and Hamilton performed at a concert celebrating Liverpool music for the Eurovision Song Contest.

On 11 October 2024, Hamilton announced via her Instagram account that she would be stepping down as a member of the group after a final performance two days later to concentrate on her solo career, effectively bringing Atomic Kitten to an end.

== Members ==
=== Former members ===
- Kerry Katona (1998–2001, 2012–2017)
- Liz McClarnon (1998–2008, 2012–2024)
- Natasha Hamilton (1999–2008, 2012–2024)
- Jenny Frost (2001–2008, 2021)

== Discography ==
- Right Now (2000)
- Feels So Good (2002)
- Ladies Night (2003)

== Awards and nominations ==
Year	Awards	Work	Category	Result
2000	Smash Hits Poll Winners Party	Themselves	Best British Band	Nominated
2000	Smash Hits Poll Winners Party	Themselves	Best New Band	Won
2001	The Record of the Year	"Whole Again"	Record of the Year	Nominated
2001	Smash Hits Poll Winners Party	"Whole Again"	Best Single	Won
2001	Top of the Pops Awards	"Whole Again"	Best Single	Nominated
2001	Top of the Pops Awards	Themselves	Best Pop Act	Nominated
2001	TMF Awards	Themselves	Best Pop International	Won
2001	VIVA Comet Awards	Themselves	Best International Newcomer	Nominated
2001	MTV EMA	Themselves	Best Pop	Nominated
2002	MTV EMA	Themselves	Best UK & Ireland Act	Nominated
2002	TMF Awards	Themselves	Best Pop International	Won
2002	Top of the Pops Awards	Themselves	Best Pop Act	Nominated
2002	Smash Hits Poll Winners Party	Themselves	Best Band on Planet Pop	Nominated
2002	Smash Hits Poll Winners Party	Themselves	Best UK Band	Nominated
2002	Pop Factory Awards	Themselves	Best Pop Factory Performance	Nominated
2002	Pop Factory Awards	Themselves	Best Pop Act	Nominated
2002	Ivor Novello Awards	"Whole Again"	Most Performed Work	Nominated
2002	Ivor Novello Awards	"Whole Again"	International Hit of the Year	Nominated
2002	ECHO Awards	"Whole Again"	Best International Song	Nominated
2002	APRA Music Awards	"Whole Again"	Most Performed Foreign Work	Nominated
2002	Brit Awards	"Whole Again"	Best British Single	Nominated
2002	The Record of the Year	"The Tide Is High (Get the Feeling)"	Record of the Year	Nominated
2003	Brit Awards	"The Tide Is High (Get the Feeling)"	Best British Single	Nominated
2003	Radio Disney Music Awards	"The Tide Is High (Get the Feeling)"	Best Song	Nominated
2003	Radio Disney Music Awards	"The Tide Is High (Get the Feeling)"	Best Song to Watch Your Dad Sing	Nominated
2003	Radio Disney Music Awards	Themselves	Best Group	Nominated
2003	NME Awards	Themselves	Worst Band	Nominated
2003	Silver Clef Award	Themselves	Artist of the Year	Won
2003	NRJ Music Awards	Themselves	International Duo/Group of the Year	Nominated

== Tours ==
Headlining

- Right Here, Right Now Tour (2001–2002)
- Be with Us Tour (2002–2003)
- Greatest Hits Tour (2004)

Co-headlining

- Smash Hits Tour (with various artists) (2000–2001)
- The Big Reunion (with various artists) (2013)
- The Hits Tour (2014–2016)
- The Pop Tour (with various artists) (2017–2019)
- 90s Baby Pop Tour (with various artists) (2022–2023)
