= Eternal Flame (song) =

1989 song by the Bangles

- US retail cassette single

Single by the Bangles

from the album Everything
- B-side: "What I Meant to Say"; "Walk Like an Egyptian" (extended dance mix)
- Released: January 23, 1989
- Studio: Studio 55, Ocean Way Recording (Los Angeles, California)
- Genre: Soft rock
- Length: 3:56
- Label: Columbia
- Composer: Tom Kelly
- Lyricists: Susanna Hoffs; Billy Steinberg
- Producer: Davitt Sigerson

The Bangles singles chronology
"In Your Room" (1988)	"Eternal Flame" (1989)	"Be with You" (1989)

Music video
- "Eternal Flame" on YouTube

"Eternal Flame" is a song by American pop rock group the Bangles for their third studio album, Everything (1988). Released on January 23, 1989, by CBS, the power ballad was written by group member Susanna Hoffs with the established hit songwriting team of Billy Steinberg and Tom Kelly. Davitt Sigerson produced it.

Upon its 1989 single release, "Eternal Flame" became a number-one hit in nine countries, including Australia, Sweden, the United Kingdom, and the United States. Since its release, it has been covered by many musical artists, including Australian boy band Human Nature, who reached the Australian top 10 with their version, and British girl group Atomic Kitten, who topped four national charts with their rendition.

== Production ==
Two of the song's three writers, Tom Kelly and Susanna Hoffs, had met via the Bangles' October 30, 1986, concert at the Avalon Hollywood (then the Palace). Kelly attended the concert and backstage met the group's members. This led to Hoffs writing songs with Kelly and his regular songwriting partner Billy Steinberg, an experience she found interesting in contrast to her usual songwriting habits. Hoffs would develop lyrics based on a melody she worked out while playing around with a guitar, while Kelly and Steinberg would start with a lyrical idea and write music to fit it. The trio's first composition to be recorded was "I Need a Disguise", which Belinda Carlisle recorded for her 1986 solo debut album. The Bangles' 1988 album Everything would feature two Hoffs/Kelly/Steinberg compositions, both with lead vocals by Hoffs: the upbeat lead single "In Your Room" and "Eternal Flame".

The "Eternal Flame" metaphor was suggested by two eternal flames: one at the gravesite of Elvis Presley at Graceland, where the Bangles had been given a private tour. Hoffs said, "we were taken out to the Garden of Memories, and there was this little box which was supposed to have a lit flame in it, an eternal flame. Actually, that day it was raining so the flame was not on"—and one at a local synagogue in Palm Springs which Steinberg attended as a child. Steinberg explained, "Susanna was talking about the Bangles having visited Graceland, and she said there was some type of shrine to Elvis that included some kind of eternal flame. As soon as those words were mentioned, I immediately thought of the synagogue in the town of Palm Springs, California where I grew up. I remember during our Sunday school class they would walk us through the sanctuary. There was one little red light and they told us it was called the eternal flame."

After Steinberg suggested writing a song titled "Eternal Flame", he and Hoffs wrote the song's lyrics at Steinberg's house and then according to Hoffs brought the lyrics to Tom Kelly's studio where Kelly completed the music and the demo was cut. Steinberg recalls Kelly also being at Steinberg's house when the lyrics were written, beginning the music's composition there. "'Eternal Flame' was retro in that it has no chorus", Steinberg observed in 2021. The song instead works from an AABA song structure and has a middle eight, the portion beginning "Say my name / Sun shines through the rain", that it repeats twice. "In the 60s, it wasn't that unusual to have songs structured in that way, but, by the 80s, choruses were much more developed and middle eights had started to disappear", Steinberg recalls. While the final recording is a power ballad, the demo was deliberately guitar-oriented, despite sounding more suitable for a keyboard, as the Bangles had no keyboardist. When Hoffs played the demo at a band meeting where members and producer Davitt Sigerson decided what they would record for the upcoming album, it was rejected. Hoffs was "heartbroken" since she had been very enthusiastic about the song, but accepted her bandmates' decision.

During the sessions, Sigerson admitted to Hoffs that he could not get the demo out of his mind. He worked out an arrangement evoking a music box, bringing in keyboardist John Philip Shenale to give the track a chiming effect. According to Hoffs, Sigerson's production of the track was inspired by the vintage recordings of Patsy Cline which he knew Hoffs enjoyed singing along to. Hoffs would also recall that the Bangles' manager, Miles Copeland, overhearing the recording session for "Eternal Flame", had been displeased by the lack of drums and that Hoffs had to resist pressure to re-record it with a stronger beat. Hoffs sang the studio recording of the song naked after Sigerson pranked her by telling her Olivia Newton-John recorded unclad (a falsehood Sigerson eventually admitted to). "I imagined it would feel like skinny dipping—vulnerable yet freeing – and I decided to try it. Nobody could see me; there was a baffle in front of me and it was dark." She liked the experience enough to sing all her vocals on the album that way.

== Critical reception ==
Considered by Billy Steinberg to be a stylistic fusion of the Byrds and the Beatles, especially evoking the latter group's "For No One", "Mother Nature's Son" (the bridge part) and "Here There & Everywhere", "Eternal Flame" elicited different points of comparison from contemporary music critics, among them: "a backhanded tribute to every sappy string-drenched ballad—from Lulu's 'To Sir With Love' to Merrilee Rush's 'Angel of the Morning'—that ever overstayed its welcome on the radio"; "[a] fluffy romantic fantasy [that] resembled the Carpenters a lot more than the Beatles"; "a cloying ballad that Andrew Lloyd Webber could have written for Sarah Brightman"; "[On] 'Eternal Flame' Hoffs does her best inspired reading of Kate Bush". Pan-European magazine Music & Media commented that "this is a very sweet and conventional gospel-tinged ballad with the emphasis on close harmonies."

Vicki Peterson of the Bangles described "Eternal Flame" as "a beautiful song [which] at the time I didn't think essentially Bangles. Anyone could've taken the song and made it a hit". A retrospective AllMusic critique by Matthew Greenwald assessed "Eternal Flame" as "somewhat removed from the Bangles' sound and vibe...[its] gentle, lilting melody...seems ready-made for an artist such as Anita Baker or Whitney Houston. The song features a dramatic bridge that takes the song to a wonderfully emotional place, and adds to the overall dynamics of the piece. In the end, it doesn't fit the Bangles' catalog well, but it remains a minor pop standard." In June 2021, Tom Eames of Smooth Radio ranked "Eternal Flame" as the Bangles' best song.

== Single release ==
=== United States ===
Number-one Billboard Hot 100 hits written
by Billy Steinberg and Tom Kelly
- 1985 "Like a Virgin" by Madonna
- 1986 "True Colors" by Cyndi Lauper
- 1987 "Alone" by Heart
- 1988 "So Emotional" by Whitney Houston
- 1989 "Eternal Flame" (written with
  Susanna Hoffs) by the Bangles

Given that the Bangles' "Walk Like an Egyptian" had been ranked by Billboard as the number one single of 1987 and that the group had reached number two on the Billboard Hot 100 in 1986 with "Manic Monday" and in 1987 with "Hazy Shade of Winter", the number-five Hot 100 peak of the lead single from their album Everything, "In Your Room", was a comparative disappointment with its parent album Everything—whose original Billboard 200 peak was number 33—being considered a flop. The January 1989 release of "Eternal Flame" as the new Bangles' single was heralded in the Chicago Tribune with the song described as an "old-fashioned killer ballad that is just about as far as one could get from the psychedelic sound of the group's recent Top 5 hit 'In Your Room'."

"Eternal Flame" debuted at number 56 on the Hot 100 issue dated February 4, 1989, when "In Your Room" was ranked at number 45, and rose to number one after eight weeks, making the Bangles the third all-female group to top the Hot 100 multiple times, after the Shirelles and the Supremes. In addition "Eternal Flame" set a record for the song's co-writers: Billy Steinberg and Tom Kelly, as the first songwriting team to score a number-one Hot 100 hit five years in a row. "Eternal Flame" also afforded the Bangles a two-week tenure at number one on the Adult Contemporary chart.

=== International ===
In the United Kingdom, where "In Your Room" had stalled at number 35, "Eternal Flame" was released on January 23, 1989, and made an eight-week ascent into the top 40 of the UK Singles Chart before reaching number one on April 15, holding the spot for three additional weeks. On June 17, 1989, when the song was at number 38 on the UK chart, it was deleted to clear the way for "Be with You", the third single released from Everything. Overall, "Eternal Flame" spent 20 weeks on the UK chart and was the country's third-best-selling single of 1989. "Eternal Flame" spent three weeks at number one in Sweden and totaled 18 weeks on the Swedish Singles Chart, and it also spent seven weeks on the Dutch Top 40. The song was Australia's fourth-biggest-selling single of 1989, spending three non-consecutive weeks at number one.

== Track listings ==
- US 7-inch and cassette single
1. "Eternal Flame" – 3:46
2. "What I Meant to Say" – 3:20
- UK and Australian 12-inch single

A1. "Eternal Flame" – 3:55
B1. "Walk Like an Egyptian" (12-inch dance mix) – 5:48
B2. "What I Meant to Say" – 3:20

- UK cassette single
1. "Eternal Flame"
2. "Going Down to Liverpool"
3. "Hero Takes a Fall"
4. "James"
- European 12-inch maxi-single

A1. "Eternal Flame" – 3:56
A2. "What I Meant to Say" – 3:20
B1. "Walk Like an Egyptian" (extended dance mix) – 5:48

- Hong Kong mini-CD single
1. "Eternal Flame" – 3:55
2. "Manic Monday" – 3:04
3. "Hazy Shade of Winter" – 2:48
4. "Walk Like an Egyptian" – 3:23
- Japanese mini-CD single
1. "Eternal Flame (胸いっぱいの愛)"
2. "Crash & Burn"

== Personnel ==
Personnel are lifted from the US cassette single sleeve.

- Susanna Hoffs – writing
- Billy Steinberg – writing
- Tom Kelly – writing
- The Bangles – vocals
- Davitt Sigerson – production
- John Beverly Jones – recording
- Frank Filipetti – mixing

== Charts ==
=== Weekly charts ===
Chart (1989)	Peak position
Australia (ARIA)	1
Austria (Ö3 Austria Top 40)	3
Belgium (Ultratop 50 Flanders)	1
Canada (The Record)	11
Canada Top Singles (RPM)	2
Chile (UPI)	4
Denmark (IFPI)	7
El Salvador	5
Europe (Eurochart Hot 100)	2
Finland (Suomen virallinen lista)	9
France (SNEP)	5
Ireland (IRMA)	1
Luxembourg (Radio Luxembourg)	2
Netherlands (Dutch Top 40)	1
Netherlands (Single Top 100)	1
New Zealand (Recorded Music NZ)	4
Nicaragua	3
Norway (VG-lista)	1
Portugal (AFP)	1
Quebec (ADISQ)	5
Sweden (Sverigetopplistan)	1
Switzerland (Schweizer Hitparade)	2
UK Singles (Official Charts)	1
Uruguay (UPI)	8
US Billboard Hot 100	1
US Adult Contemporary (Billboard)	1
US Cash Box Top 100	1
West Germany (GfK)	4

=== Year-end charts ===
Chart (1989)	Position
Australia (ARIA)	4
Austria (Ö3 Austria Top 40)	10
Belgium (Ultratop)	3
Canada Top Singles (RPM)	26
Europe (Eurochart Hot 100)	4
Netherlands (Dutch Top 40)	1
Netherlands (Single Top 100)	5
New Zealand (RIANZ)	15
Switzerland (Schweizer Hitparade)	5
UK Singles (OCC)	3
US Billboard Hot 100	32
US Adult Contemporary (Billboard)	19
US Cash Box Top 100	7
West Germany (Media Control)	15

== Certifications and sales ==
Region	Certification	Certified units/sales
Australia (ARIA)	Platinum	70,000^{^}
Denmark (IFPI Danmark)	Gold	45,000^{‡}
Netherlands (NVPI)	Platinum	100,000^{^}
New Zealand (RMNZ)	Platinum	10,000^{*}
Sweden (GLF)	Gold	25,000^{^}
United Kingdom (BPI)	Platinum	600,000^{‡}
United States (RIAA)	Gold	500,000^{^}
^{*} Sales figures based on certification alone.^{^} Shipments figures based on certification alone.^{‡} Sales+streaming figures based on certification alone.

== Aftermath ==
Rather than consolidating the Bangles' stardom, the success of "Eternal Flame" was to have a negative impact on the group, underscoring the wide public perception of the Bangles as star attraction Hoffs and her backing band. The choice for the third single release from the Everything album being "Be with You", the group's first single led by Debbi Peterson since the band's second single release "Going Down to Liverpool" (1984), was an apparent attempt to redress the balance which failed, as "Be with You" would rise no higher than number 30 on the Hot 100 in the summer of 1989, when its UK chart peak would be number 23. The Bangles announced their disbanding the second week of October 1989.

== Tomoya Nagase featuring 3T version ==
"Eternal Flame"

Single by Tomoya Nagase featuring 3T
- Released: 1997
- Genre: J-pop
- Length: 3:56
- Label: Universal Music Japan
- Songwriters: Susanna Hoffs; Tom Kelly; Billy Steinberg
- Producer: 3T

3T singles chronology
"Gotta Be You" (1996)	"Eternal Flame" (1997)	"Stuck on You" (2003)

In 1997, a Japanese version of the song was recorded by Tomoya Nagase, the vocalist of the Japanese idol rock group Tokio, featuring 3T. This song was used as the theme song of the Nippon TV drama DXD, in which Nagase played the main role. He also wrote the Japanese version lyrics. This version was released as a single in Japan under the name of "Tomoya with 3T".

== Human Nature version ==
"Eternal Flame"

Single by Human Nature

from the album Counting Down
- Released: October 1999
- Studio: Tiger Recording (Sydney, Australia)
- Length: 3:25
- Label: Columbia
- Songwriters: Susanna Hoffs; Tom Kelly; Billy Steinberg
- Producer: Andrew Klippel

Human Nature singles chronology
"Don't Cry" (1999)	"Eternal Flame" (1999)	"Be There With You" (2000)

Music video
- "Eternal Flame" on YouTube

In 1999, Australian boy band Human Nature covered "Eternal Flame" and released it as the fourth single from their second album Counting Down. It peaked at number eight on the ARIA Singles Chart and was certified gold.

=== Track listings ===
Australian CD single 1

1. "Eternal Flame"
2. "She's So Gone"
3. "Breaking Me Down"
4. "Don't Cry" (Discothèque Club remix)
5. "Eternal Flame" (video clip)

Australian CD single 2

1. "Eternal Flame"
2. "Shake You Outta My Head"
3. "She's So Gone"
4. "Breaking Me Down"
5. "Don't Cry" (Discothèque Club remix – 7-inch edit)
6. "Eternal Flame" (video clip)

=== Credits and personnel ===
Credits are lifted from the Australian CD single liner notes.

Studios

- Recorded at Tiger Recording (Sydney, Australia)
- Mixed by Larrabee West Studio (Los Angeles, California, US)
- Mastered at Sony Music Studios (New York City, US)

Personnel

- Susanna Hoffs, Billy Steinberg, Tom Kelly – writing
- Human Nature – vocals
- Andrew Klippel – production
- David Hemming – recording
- Dave Way – mixing
- Vlado Meller – mastering

=== Charts ===
==== Weekly charts ====
Chart (1999)	Peak position
Australia (ARIA)	8

==== Year-end charts ====
Chart (1999)	Position
Australia (ARIA)	58

=== Certifications ===
Region	Certification	Certified units/sales
Australia (ARIA)	Gold	35,000^{^}
^{^} Shipments figures based on certification alone.

== Atomic Kitten version ==
"Eternal Flame"

Single by Atomic Kitten

from the album Right Now (re-issue)
- A-side: "Right Now" (Australia only)
- B-side: "Dancing in the Street"
- Released: July 23, 2001
- Studio: Metropolis (London, UK)
- Genre: Pop
- Length: 3:17
- Label: Innocent; Virgin
- Songwriters: Susanna Hoffs; Tom Kelly; Billy Steinberg
- Producer: Andy Wright

Atomic Kitten singles chronology
"Whole Again" (2001)	"Eternal Flame" (2001)	"You Are" (2001)

Music video
- "Eternal Flame" on YouTube

English girl group Atomic Kitten subsequently recorded the song in 2001 and released it as the lead single from the reissue of their debut studio album, Right Now, on July 23, 2001. It was the group's first single to feature new band member Jenny Frost. Their version was produced by Andy Wright, and a music video directed by Phil Griffin was made for the song.

=== Critical reception ===
Lars Trillingsgaar, head of music for Danish radio station ANR Hit FM, said that Atomic Kitten's cover of "Eternal Flame" took the original "in a whole new direction", comparing it to another cover of a popular 1980s song that was released in 2001: "Another Day in Paradise" by siblings Brandy and Ray J, originally by Phil Collins. Trillingsgaar also noted that the cover had the ability to touch its listeners, much like the original had done.

=== Chart performance ===
Atomic Kitten's version was released on July 23, 2001; in Australia, it was issued alongside a re-release of the group's debut single, "Right Now" (1999). In the United Kingdom, it entered the UK Singles Chart at number one, selling 150,000 copies during its first week of release to beat out Destiny's Child's "Bootylicious", which debuted at number two with 56,000 copies sold. The Official Charts Company credits this result to "Bootylicious" having already been released on the parent album, Survivor, whereas the re-release of Right Now did not occur until after "Eternal Flame" had reached number one. It stayed at number one for two weeks and has sold 458,000 copies as of July 2022.

Outside the UK, the cover reached number one in the Flanders region of Belgium and in New Zealand, staying one week at the top in both regions. In France, Ireland, and Sweden, it reached number two, and it became a top-ten hit in Austria, Germany, Hungary, the Netherlands, Portugal, and Switzerland. It is certified gold in the UK, Belgium, France, New Zealand, and Sweden.

=== Track listings ===
European CD single

1. "Eternal Flame" – 3:15
2. "Dancing in the Street" – 3:39

UK & European enhanced CD single

1. "Eternal Flame" – 3:15
2. "Album Medley" – 5:30
3. "Eternal Flame" (Blacksmith RnB Rub) – 3:54
4. "Eternal Flame" (video) – 3:10

European maxi-single

1. "Eternal Flame" – 3:15
2. "Album Medley" – 5:30
3. "Eternal Flame" (Blacksmith RnB Rub) – 3:45

Canadian CD single

1. "Eternal Flame" – 3:15
2. "Megamix" – 6:00

Australian CD single

1. "Right Now" – 3:35
2. "Eternal Flame" – 3:15
3. "Right Now" (K-Klass Phazerfunk club mix) – 7:22
4. "Eternal Flame" (Blacksmith RnB dub) – 3:55
5. "Eternal Flame" (video) – 3:10

=== Credits and personnel ===
Credits are lifted from the European enhanced CD single liner notes and Right Now album booklet.

Studio

- Recorded and mixed at Metropolis Studios (London, UK)

Personnel

- Susanna Hoffs, Tom Kelly, Billy Steinberg – writing
- Atomic Kitten – vocals
- Claudia Fontaine – additional backing vocals
- Geoff Holroyde, Paul Simm – additional musicians
- Andy Wright – production
- Pete Craigie – mixing
- Alan Douglas, James Brown – engineering
- Ned Douglas – additional programming

=== Charts ===
==== Weekly charts ====
Weekly chart performance for "Eternal Flame"
Chart (2001–2002)	Peak position
Australia (ARIA) with "Right Now"	47
Austria (Ö3 Austria Top 40)	3
Belgium (Ultratop 50 Flanders)	1
Belgium (Ultratop 50 Wallonia)	18
Canada (Nielsen SoundScan)	15
Denmark (Tracklisten)	12
Europe (Eurochart Hot 100)	4
France (SNEP)	2
Germany (GfK)	5
Hungary (Mahasz)	9
Ireland (IRMA)	2
Netherlands (Dutch Top 40)	9
Netherlands (Single Top 100)	6
New Zealand (Recorded Music NZ)	1
Norway (VG-lista)	13
Poland Airplay (Music & Media)	7
Poland (Polish Airplay Charts)	11
Portugal (AFP)	9
Romania (Romanian Top 100)	14
Scottish Singles Sales (Official Charts)	1
Spain (Promusicae)	19
Sweden (Sverigetopplistan)	2
Switzerland (Schweizer Hitparade)	9
UK Singles (Official Charts)	1
UK Airplay (Music Week)	4

==== Year-end charts ====
Year-end chart performance for "Eternal Flame"
Chart (2001)	Position
Austria (Ö3 Austria Top 40)	22
Belgium (Ultratop 50 Flanders)	28
Belgium (Ultratop 50 Wallonia)	99
Europe (Eurochart Hot 100)	49
Germany (Media Control)	44
Ireland (IRMA)	25
Netherlands (Dutch Top 40)	82
Netherlands (Single Top 100)	67
New Zealand (RIANZ)	40
Romania (Romanian Top 100)	72
Sweden (Hitlistan)	26
Switzerland (Schweizer Hitparade)	59
UK Singles (OCC)	15

Chart (2002)	Position
Canada (Nielsen SoundScan)	114
Europe (Eurochart Hot 100)	63
France (SNEP)	32

=== Certifications ===
Certifications for "Eternal Flame"
Region	Certification	Certified units/sales
Belgium (BRMA)	Gold	25,000^{*}
France (SNEP)	Gold	250,000^{*}
New Zealand (RMNZ)	Gold	5,000^{*}
Sweden (GLF)	Gold	15,000^{^}
United Kingdom (BPI)	Gold	458,000
^{*} Sales figures based on certification alone.^{^} Shipments figures based on certification alone.

=== Release history ===
Release dates and formats for "Eternal Flame"
Region	Date	Format(s)	Label(s)	Ref(s).
United Kingdom	July 23, 2001	CD; cassette	Innocent; Virgin	
Australia	September 17, 2001	CD	Innocent; Virgin	
