= Liz McClarnon =

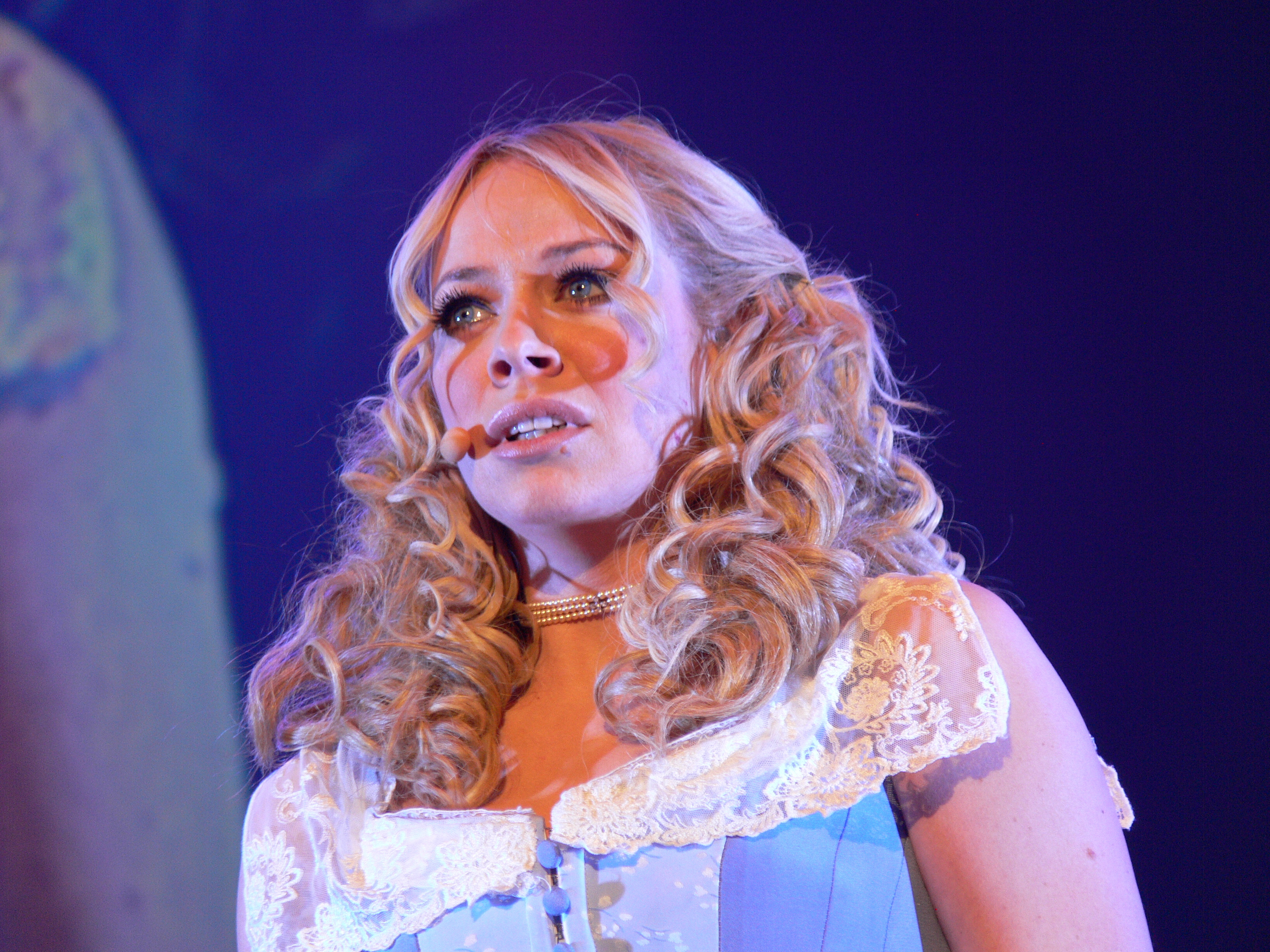
- McClarnon performing as Beth in Jeff Wayne's The War of the Worlds, 2010.

Background information
- Born: Elizabeth Margaret McClarnon; 10 April 1981 (age 45)
- Origin: Liverpool, England
- Genres: Pop
- Occupations: Singer; songwriter; actress
- Instrument: Vocals
- Years active: 1997–present
- Label: All Around the World
- Member of: Atomic Kitten
- Spouse: Peter Cho (m. 2023)
- Website: lizmcclarnon.com

Elizabeth Margaret McClarnon-Cho (born 10 April 1981) is an English singer, songwriter and actress, who is the longest serving member of the girl group Atomic Kitten, with whom she has scored three number-one singles and two number-one albums. McClarnon co-wrote several Atomic Kitten songs, including the UK top 10 hits "See Ya", "I Want Your Love" and "Someone Like Me".

== Career ==
=== 1997–2004: Atomic Kitten ===
In 1997, while McClarnon was still in secondary school, her music teacher arranged for her to take part in an audition with OMD frontman Andy McCluskey, who was aiming to create a new girl group. The group became Atomic Kitten, which was made up of McClarnon, Kerry Katona and Natasha Hamilton, and they released their first record in 1999. Katona left the group in 2001 and was replaced by Jenny Frost. Atomic Kitten have had three UK number one singles, "Whole Again", "Eternal Flame", and "The Tide Is High (Get the Feeling)". They also had two UK number one albums, Right Now and Feels So Good, both being certified double-platinum in the UK for sales of over 600,000 copies each. The total worldwide sales are estimated at 6.2 million singles and 4 million albums. Liz is the only member of the group to write any material. McClarnon appeared in the video for "Da Ya Think I'm Sexy?" with the FHM Hot 100, which charted at number 10 in the UK.

=== 2005–2012: Solo career and stage ===
In 2005, McClarnon signed a solo deal with All Around the World. In December, she was the opening act of Magnet Tour, by Robin Gibb. On 13 February 2006, she released her first solo single, "Woman in Love", a cover of Barbra Streisand's 1980 hit. The song was released as a basic single worldwide, but in the UK it was released as a double A-side with a cover of Jackie Wilson's "I Get the Sweetest Feeling". "Woman in Love" peaked at Top100 in Australia, the Netherlands, Belgium, Ireland, Top20 in Spain and Top5 in UK and Scotland. On 27 December 2006, McClarnon appeared in the ITV documentary The Girl With the Golden Hair and performed three songs with Richard O’Brien: "Thank You for the Music", "I Wonder (Departure)" and "I’m a Marionette". In March 2007, McClarnon recorded "(Don't It Make You) Happy" to compete for the UK in the Eurovision Song Contest 2007, but failed – the competition was won by Scooch.

Despite the success of the first single, McClarnon's album release was delayed several times for 3 years, until it was cancelled when she left the label in 2008. That year, McClarnon won Celebrity MasterChef. In 2009, she recorded "Lately" for the Global One Music Charity Project. The same song has been recorded by different artists all around the world in different languages. Also in 2009, McClarnon signed with the label 3 Beat Records and planned to release "Not in Love" as a single, but this never happened, and she left the label. In 2010, she presented the reality show Hotter Than My Daughter, which aired at the beginning of February 2010 for six weeks, on BBC Three.

From 2010 to 2011, she played Beth in Jeff Wayne's Musical Version of The War of the Worlds. In 2011, McClarnon was cast as Paulette in the first UK tour of Legally Blonde The Musical. She also starred in the Cinderella pantomime in the Liverpool Empire in 2012, playing the lead role.

=== 2013–present: Atomic Kitten return ===
On 31 January 2013, the original line-up of Atomic Kitten – McClarnon, Hamilton and Katona – would reform for The Big Reunion, along with five other pop groups of their time – 911, Honeyz, B*Witched, Five and Liberty X. They have been performing live touring Europe ever since.

== Personal life ==
McClarnon married Peter Cho in 2023. The couple had their first child in 2025.

== Discography ==
=== Singles ===
List of singles, with selected chart positions
Title	Year	Peak chart positions								Album
Title	Year	UK	AUS	BEL	EUR	IRE	NL	SCO	SPA	Album
"Woman in Love"	2006	5	77	52	20	21	77	2	16	Non-album single
"I Get the Sweetest Feeling"	2006	5	—	—	—	—	—	—	—	Non-album single
"—" denotes releases that did not chart or were not released in that territory.

=== Promotional singles ===
Title	Year	Album
"(Don't It Make You) Happy"	2007	Eurovision Song Contest 2007

== Filmography ==
=== Television ===
Year	Title	Role	Notes
2005	Celebrity Love Island	Contestant	Series 1
2008	Celebrity MasterChef	Contestant	Series 3
2010–2011	Hotter Than My Daughter	Presenter	

== Stage ==
Year	Title	Role
2010–2011	Jeff Wayne's Musical Version of The War of the Worlds	Beth
2011	Legally Blonde The Musical	Paulette
2012	Cinderella	Cinderella
