= Whole Again =

2001 single by Atomic Kitten

Single by Atomic Kitten

from the album Right Now
- B-side: "Holiday"; "Locomotion"
- Released: 29 January 2001
- Studio: Motor Museum (Liverpool, England); Wise Buddah (London, England)
- Genre: Pop
- Length: 3:03
- Label: Innocent; Virgin
- Songwriters: Andy McCluskey; Stuart Kershaw; Jem Godfrey; Bill Padley
- Producers: Engine (original version); Jem Godfrey, Bill Padley (re-recorded version)

Atomic Kitten singles chronology
"Follow Me" (2000)	"Whole Again" (2001)	"Eternal Flame" (2001)

Audio sample
- Whole Again: file; help

Music video
- "Whole Again" (second version) on YouTube

"Whole Again" is a song by the English girl group Atomic Kitten for their debut studio album, Right Now (2000). The original demo, first included on the Japanese release, was co-written and produced by Orchestral Manoeuvres in the Dark members and Atomic Kitten founders Andy McCluskey and Stuart Kershaw under their production moniker Engine, with Jem Godfrey and Bill Padley providing additional songwriting and production for the re-recorded UK album version.

"Whole Again" is the group's biggest-selling single and was the final single to feature founding member Kerry Katona, who left the group midway through promoting the single; she was then replaced by new member Jenny Frost from fellow English girl group Precious, who re-recorded Katona's spoken parts for promotion. As a result, the music video was reshot and Frost's vocals appeared on the reissue of Right Now. "Whole Again" was released as the fifth UK single (and sixth overall) from the album and became an international success, reaching number one in several countries and selling over a million copies in the UK alone.

The four writers were nominated for the Ivor Novello Award for excellence in songwriting, and Billboard ranked the track number 96 on their list of the "100 Greatest Girl Group Songs of All Time".

== Background ==
"Whole Again" was written and produced by Orchestral Manoeuvres in the Dark members and Atomic Kitten founders Andy McCluskey and Stuart Kershaw. A mid-tempo ballad that combines a strolling beat and one-note string crescendos, it initially featured all lines spoken by Kerry Katona with only the chorus sung by Liz McClarnon and Natasha Hamilton. While this version was included on the Japanese version of Atomic Kitten's debut album Right Now (2000), Innocent Records A&R manager Hugh Goldsmith felt that it was still a half‑finished song and asked songwriters and producers Jem Godfrey and Bill Padley to re-write it for the UK version of the album. With the chorus being already there, Godfrey and Padley decided on writing a melody for the verses and changed most of the chords in "Whole Again", but they were not able to change its key. Padley later described the process as "quite difficult, because the chorus of the song was so hooky that the verse had to lead up to it but not overshadow it, which is why it ended up sounding as low as it does. We very carefully worked out what the vocal range of the Kittens was, because the last thing we wanted was to write a melody that was fantastic but that they wouldn't be able to sing."

Recording of the new verses took place at Padley's West Hampstead music studio. A hasty affair due to the band's hectic schedule at that time, much of the vocals were recorded within 30 minutes, with McClarnon and Hamilton each singing the whole song twice only. As well as recording the new vocals, Godfrey and Padley also took over the job of producing "Whole Again", although they were careful to preserve the features of McCluskey and Kershaw's original version, including Katona's spoken middle-8 section. While the duo kept much of the "underwater organ sound" from the original session, they were forced to replay and retune other elements and added a few additional percussion and string loops from the sample albums Vinylistics 3 and Advanced Orchestra to the track. Padley and singer friend Angie Giles also provided vocals for the gospel part near the end of the song for which the producers tracked about forty vocals and put several delays and effects on it to sound like a choir. While Innocent Records liked their version, they asked Godfrey and Padley to re-record McClarnon and Hamilton's vocals at least two more times, though they eventually decided on using the original vocals that had been recorded in West Hampstead in the end.

== Release ==
While Innocent Records planned to release "Whole Again" as Atomic Kitten's fourth single at times, it was eventually replaced by "Follow Me" to lead the UK release of parent album Right Now. Following the commercial underperformance of both "Follow Me" and the initial release of the album, Atomic Kitten persuaded their label to release "Whole Again" as a last-ditch attempt to keep their record deal. During promotion for the single, Katona announced her pregnancy and subsequent decision to leave the group. With the single's release imminent, the group opted to recruit Jenny Frost, previously a member of fellow British girl group Precious, as a replacement and continued their promotional campaign. The version with Frost's spoken word portion replaced the original version for radio airplay, and it was subsequently included on a reissue of Right Now. An alternate take of Frost's vocals was issued as a bonus track on international versions of the group's second album, Feels So Good.

== Chart performance ==
The single debuted at number one in the United Kingdom with first-week sales of 69,286 copies, staying atop the chart for four weeks and increasing in sales during every week that it was at number one. It has since gone on to sell over 1,000,000 copies in the UK alone. It is the fourth best-selling single by a girl group of all time, after "Wannabe" and "2 Become 1" by the Spice Girls and "Never Ever" by All Saints. It also became the 13th overall best-selling single of the 2000s decade. As of November 2016, it remains the biggest-selling song of the 21st century in the UK by a girl group.

In Australia, "Whole Again" peaked at number two on the ARIA Singles Chart, being certified double platinum for shipments of over 140,000 copies. The single was also released in Germany and New Zealand, where it secured the number-one position for six consecutive weeks in both countries. Additionally, the song was certified platinum in both countries. It additionally peaked atop the charts of Austria, Ireland, and the Netherlands, as well as the Eurochart Hot 100. In Denmark, Flanders, Romania, Spain, Sweden, and Switzerland, it entered the top 20.

== Music videos ==
The music video for "Whole Again" was filmed on a very small budget due to the commercial failure of previous single "Follow Me". It features the Kittens singing in front of a plain white background—similar to the video for the Sugababes' debut single, "Overload". The original version of the video includes Kerry Katona, who had left the group just before the song's release. After Katona's departure and replacement by Jenny Frost, parts of the video were re-shot with the new line-up as well as solo shots of Frost. These were then edited together with scenes of Hamilton and McClarnon from the original video.

As a result of the single's huge success in many international markets, a second music video was filmed for the U.S. release with a much larger budget. This version features the three women walking through the streets in Downtown Los Angeles and walking out into the countryside, gradually picking up more people along the way. The video ends with the camera zooming out on the field making the crowd take on the shape of Atomic Kitten's logo.

== Track listings ==
UK CD single

1. "Whole Again" – 3:03
2. "Holiday" – 3:13
3. "Whole Again" (Whirlwind mix) – 3:05

UK limited-edition CD single

1. "Whole Again" – 3:03
2. "Whole Again" (original version) – 3:17
3. "Locomotion" – 3:32

European CD and cassette single

1. "Whole Again" – 3:04
2. "Locomotion" – 3:32

French CD single

1. "Whole Again" – 3:03
2. "Whole Again" (Whirlwind mix) – 3:05

== Credits and personnel ==
Credits are lifted from the liner notes of Right Now.

Studios

- Recorded at Motor Museum Studios (Liverpool, England) and Wise Buddah Studios (London, England)
- Mixed at Wise Buddah Studios (London, England)

Personnel

- Andy McCluskey – writing, keys and programming
- Stuart Kershaw – writing, keys and programming
- Jem Godfrey – writing, keys and programming, additional production and remix
- Bill Padley – writing, backing vocals, keys and programming, additional production and remix
- Atomic Kitten – vocals
- Angie Giles – backing vocals
- Engine – production
- Pete Craigie – engineering
- Pat O'Shaughnessy – engineering

== Charts ==
=== Weekly charts ===
Chart (2001)	Peak position
Australia (ARIA)	2
Austria (Ö3 Austria Top 40)	1
Belgium (Ultratop 50 Flanders)	4
Croatia International (HRT) (Note: Only a partial archive of the Croatian chart is available so it is possible that the single had a higher peak.)	10
Denmark (Tracklisten)	10
Europe (Eurochart Hot 100)	1
France (SNEP)	21
Germany (GfK)	1
Ireland (IRMA)	1
Netherlands (Dutch Top 40)	1
Netherlands (Single Top 100)	1
New Zealand (Recorded Music NZ)	1
Poland Airplay (Music & Media)	12
Romania (Romanian Top 100)	11
Scottish Singles Sales (Official Charts)	1
Spain (Promusicae)	20
Sweden (Sverigetopplistan)	4
Switzerland (Schweizer Hitparade)	2
UK Singles (Official Charts)	1
UK Airplay (Music Week)	4

=== Year-end charts ===
Chart (2001)	Position
Australia (ARIA)	10
Austria (Ö3 Austria Top 40)	7
Belgium (Ultratop 50 Flanders)	29
Europe (Eurochart Hot 100)	7
Germany (Media Control)	6
Ireland (IRMA)	8
Netherlands (Dutch Top 40)	3
Netherlands (Single Top 100)	8
New Zealand (RIANZ)	3
Romania (Romanian Top 100)	69
Sweden (Hitlistan)	26
Switzerland (Schweizer Hitparade)	16
UK Singles (OCC)	4
UK Airplay (Music Week)	21

Chart (2002)	Position
Canada Radio (Nielsen BDS)	58

=== Decade-end charts ===
Chart (2000–2009)	Position
Austria (Ö3 Austria Top 40)	40
Germany (Media Control GfK)	97
Netherlands (Single Top 100)	41
UK Singles (OCC)	13

=== All-time charts ===
Chart	Position
UK Singles (OCC)	158

== Certifications and sales ==
Region	Certification	Certified units/sales
Australia (ARIA)	2× Platinum	140,000^{^}
Austria (IFPI Austria)	Gold	20,000^{*}
Belgium (BRMA)	Gold	25,000^{*}
Denmark (IFPI Danmark)	Gold	45,000^{‡}
Germany (BVMI)	Platinum	500,000^{^}
Netherlands (NVPI)	Platinum	60,000^{^}
New Zealand (RMNZ)	Platinum	30,000^{‡}
Sweden (GLF)	Gold	15,000^{^}
Switzerland (IFPI Switzerland)	Gold	20,000^{^}
United Kingdom (BPI)	2× Platinum	1,200,000^{‡}
^{*} Sales figures based on certification alone.^{^} Shipments figures based on certification alone.^{‡} Sales+streaming figures based on certification alone.

== Release history ==
Region	Date	Format(s)	Label(s)	Ref(s).
United Kingdom	29 January 2001	CD; cassette	Innocent; Virgin	
Australia	19 March 2001	CD	Innocent; Virgin	
New Zealand	2 April 2001	CD; cassette	Innocent; Virgin	

== "Southgate You're the One" ==
"Southgate You're the One"

Single by Atomic Kitten
- Released: 6 July 2021
- Length: 3:08
- Label: Columbia
- Songwriters: Andy McCluskey; Stuart Kershaw; Jem Godfrey; Bill Padley; Liz McClarnon
- Producers: Bill Padley; Goldcrush

Atomic Kitten singles chronology
"I Wish It Could Be Christmas Everyday" (2013)	"Southgate You're the One" (2021)

Lyric video
- "Southgate You're the One (Football's Coming Home Again)" on YouTube

During England's run to the semi-finals of the 2018 FIFA World Cup, England fans adapted the song as a football chant in honour of manager Gareth Southgate. The lines "Baby you're the one / You still turn me on / You can make me whole again" were changed to "Southgate, you're the one / You still turn me on / Football's coming home again" in reference to "Three Lions" by David Baddiel, Frank Skinner and the Lightning Seeds. The song had previously been adapted by Celtic fans earlier in the 2017–18 season in honour of defender Mikael Lustig and has since also been adapted by England fans in honour of women's manager Sarina Wiegman.

Andy McCluskey, one of the song's original songwriters, said about England fans adapting it into one of their chants, "The Kittens are really chuffed and are actually considering remaking the single with the England lyrics. Any time something you've created becomes widely accepted is humbling and touching. I wonder who made that first connection by starting to sing it, and suddenly everyone was doing it." During the 2018 World Cup before England's quarterfinal against Sweden, which England won 2–0, Natasha Hamilton shared a video of herself on Twitter singing the alternate lyrics.

On 3 July 2021 during UEFA Euro 2020, Atomic Kitten then returned to perform the song with reworked lyrics including the existing alternate ones in front of chanting football fans at a watch party at Boxpark Croydon for England's quarterfinal against Ukraine, which England won 4–0. On 6 July 2021, the day before England's semi-final against Denmark, the group released an official full-length version of the adapted song called "Southgate You're the One (Football's Coming Home Again)" via Columbia Records UK. Jenny Frost rejoined the band following a 13-year break to re-record the single.

=== Charts ===
Weekly chart performance for "Southgate You're the One (Football's Coming Home Again)"
Chart (2021)	Peak position
UK Singles (Official Charts)	14

== Other cover versions ==
On 26 January 2002, Darius Campbell Danesh covered the song during his time on Pop Idol. That night he had previously sung "It's Not Unusual" by Tom Jones. Atomic Kitten singer Natasha Hamilton was in the audience; Darius opened by saying, "For my next song, the job's made all the more difficult by singing a song where the original singer's in the audience tonight. Ladies and gentlemen... Natasha from Atomic Kitten. One thing that I didn't do the last time I sang a female song was ask the permission of the female songstress. So, Natasha, do I have permission to sing Whole Again?" - to which she replied, "You certainly do. Take it away." Darius replied, "Thank you."

In 2003, Swedish girl group Play covered "Whole Again" and released it as the second and final single off their second album Replay.

In 2023, Daði Freyr, the Icelandic representative for the cancelled Eurovision Song Contest 2020 and Eurovision Song Contest 2021, performed a cover of "Whole Again" as part of an interval act for the Eurovision Song Contest 2023 Grand Final called the Liverpool Songbook. This version was released as a single, with the artwork being a parody of Atomic Kitten's single artwork, with Dadi's face instead of the three members.
