= Stuart Kershaw =

British songwriter and musician

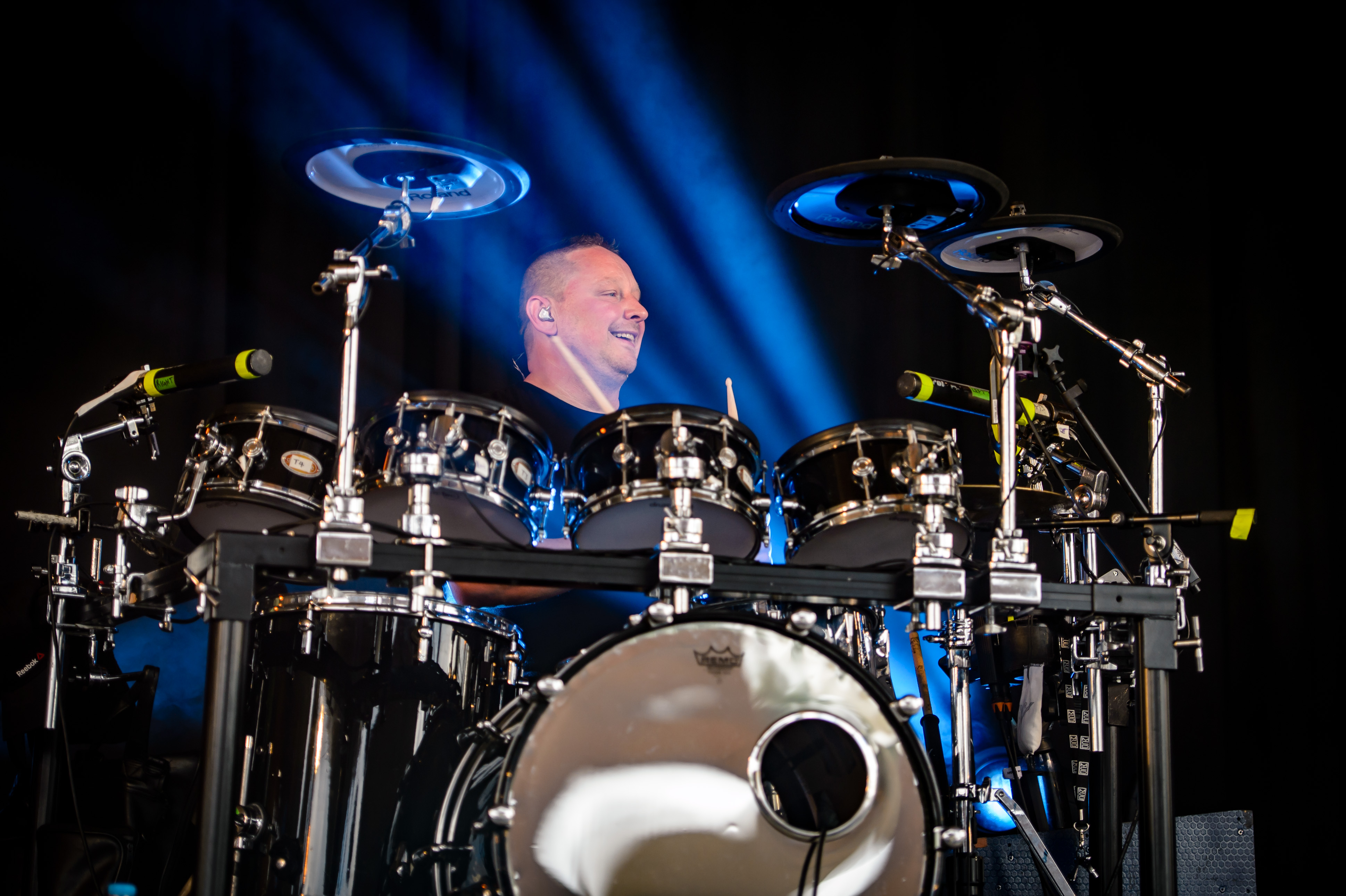
- Stuart Kershaw, 2018

Background information
- Origin: Bradford, England
- Genres: Pop; dance-pop; electronic
- Occupations: Songwriter, musician
- Instruments: Drums; piano
- Member of: Orchestral Manoeuvres in the Dark

Stuart Kershaw is a British songwriter and musician who performs as drummer of British electronic group Orchestral Manoeuvres in the Dark (OMD).

== Biography ==
Kershaw has worked with the band in various capacities since 1991, and in 2015, became the full-time replacement for original drummer Malcolm Holmes. He is credited as a co-writer on multiple OMD releases, including the 1991 UK No. 3 hit, "Sailing on the Seven Seas".

In 1998, Kershaw co-founded girl group Atomic Kitten, alongside OMD frontman Andy McCluskey. Together they co-wrote much of the group's material, including the 2001 UK chart-topper, "Whole Again".

Having attended Range High School in Formby, Kershaw is a longtime Liverpool Football Club fan. He and his wife have three children.
