= Pride celebrations in the United Kingdom =

LGBTQ events in the United Kingdom

Pride celebrations happen all across the United Kingdom, often during the summer. The first official Pride March was organised by the London Gay Liberation Front on 1 July 1972, on the weekend closest to the anniversary of the Stonewall riots. Birmingham closely followed with a march the week after. This was only 5 years after the partial decriminalisation of homosexuality in the UK.

The London Pride Parade is the longest-running and largest Pride event in the UK. Trans Pride Brighton was the first trans-specific Pride event in the UK held in 2013.

== History ==
The first Pride event of 1972 built on earlier rallies and marches for LGBTQ+ rights, beginning in 1970. They were largely grassroots, community-led events until the end of the 1990s. Important milestones in the Pride movement in the UK include:

- 1973: the local chapter of the Gay Liberation front organised a march through Brighton and a “Gay Dance” at the Royal Albion Hotel. The next Brighton Pride Parade would not be held before 1991.
- Early 1980s: Women-only marches were organised by Lesbian Strength in the week before Pride.
- 1985: Birmingham's debut Pride event was called the Gay Pub and Club Olympics and included boat and egg and spoon races judged by drag queens.

In 1988, Section 28 of the Local Government act stated that “A local authority shall not [...] intentionally promote homosexuality or publish material with the intention of promoting homosexuality”. This created funding and logistical issues for Pride organisers. Many local councils disregarded the law, which was repealed in 2003.

- 1991: The first Pride march in Belfast, Northern Ireland, brought together a 100 people and had to change route last minute to avoid protestors. However, it quickly became a tradition.
- 1992: London hosted EuroPride, the Pride event representing all of Europe.
- 1995: First large scale Pride event in Scotland, where homosexuality was only decriminalised in 1981.
- 1999: Launch of Cardiff Mardi Gras, now Pride Cymru, as a protest against police violence towards gay people.
- 2003: Launch of Reading Pride, in the year of the section 28 repeal.
- 2010: Liverpool debuted an official Pride march, on the closest weekend to 2 August 2008, the anniversary of the murder of 18-year-old gay man Michael Causer.
- 2013: Trans Pride Brighton is co-founded by Sarah Savage, Fox Fisher, Phoenix Thomas, Stephanie Scott and Sabah Choudrey.

== Pride celebrations by city ==
- Aberdeen
- Birmingham
- Bournemouth
- Brighton
- Bristol
- Canterbury
- Cardiff
- Doncaster
- Dundee
- Durham
- Edinburgh
- Exeter
- Glasgow
- Hull
- Leeds
- Leicester
- Liverpool
- London
- Manchester
- Norwich
- Nottingham
- Plymouth
- Reading
- Swansea
- Worthing
- York
