= Extraction (EP) =

2026 EP by Natasha Hamilton

EP by Natasha Hamilton
- Released: 3 July 2026
- Recorded: 2025–2026
- Label: Morpho Records
- Producer: Andy Gannon

Singles from Extraction
- 1. "Numb" Released: 16 January 2026; 2. "Fantasy" Released: 13 March 2026; 3. "White Feather" Released: 22 May 2026; 4. "Garden of Eden" Released: 3 July 2026

Extraction is the debut extended play by English singer and former Atomic Kitten member Natasha Hamilton. It was released on 3 July 2026 via her own record label, Morpho Records. It was preceded by three singles: "Numb", "Fantasy" and "White Feather", all released earlier in the year.

== Background and release ==
In October 2024, Hamilton announced her departure from the girl group Atomic Kitten after 25 years. She had previously released a solo single, "Ms. Emotional" (2010), during a hiatus from the group, however did not release her own music again until 2024, with her comeback single "Edge of Us" in May 2024, which was followed by "You Don't Know Me" in September 2024 and "Burning Letters in January 2025.

A year later, Hamilton began teasing new music and subsequently announced "Numb" as the lead single from a musical project. It was later confirmed to be the lead single of Extraction, her debut extended play (EP). In March 2026, Hamilton confirmed the EP's release for 19 June 2026. She also announced "Fantasy" as her next single from the EP. It was released on 13 March. A third single, "White Feather", was released on 22 May. Other tracks on Extraction included "Garden of Eden" and "Milk & Honey".

== Track listing ==
All tracks are written by Natasha Hamilton and Andy Gannon and produced by Gannon, with additional songwriting on track 2 by Kyle Falconer.

Extraction track listing
| No. | Title | Length |
|---|---|---|
| 1. | "Numb" | 2:56 |
| 2. | "Fantasy" | 2:54 |
| 3. | "White Feather" | 3:05 |
| 4. | "Garden of Eden" | 2:50 |
| 5. | "Milk & Honey" | 2:28 |
