= Garden of Eden (Natasha Hamilton song) =

2026 single by Natasha Hamilton

Single by Natasha Hamilton

from the EP Extraction
- Released: 3 July 2026
- Recorded: 2026
- Length: 2:50
- Label: Morpho Records
- Songwriters: Natasha Hamilton; Andy Gannon
- Producer: Andy Gannon

Natasha Hamilton singles chronology
"White Feather" (2026)	"Garden of Eden" (2026)

Music video
- "Garden of Eden" on YouTube

"Garden of Eden" is a song by English singer and former Atomic Kitten member Natasha Hamilton. It was released on 3 July 2026 alongside her debut extended play, Extraction (2026), as the EP's fourth single. Written by Hamilton and Andy Gannon and produced by the latter, it was released via her record label, Morpho Records.

The lyrical content of the song revolves around "a place where everyone can be who they want to be without judgement" and Hamilton debuted the song at Canterbury Pride a month prior to its release. An accompanying music video was released alongside the track.

== Background and release ==
In January 2026, Hamilton began teasing new music and subsequently released the single "Numb". In March 2026, Hamilton announced her debut extended play (EP), Extraction, as well as releasing "Fantasy" as her next single the same day. A third single, "White Feather" followed in May.

"Garden of Eden" was written by Hamilton, along with Andy Gannon, the latter of whom also produced the track, and was released on 3 July 2026, the same day as Extraction as the EP's fourth and final single. Lyrically, the song is about "freedom" with Hamilton stating that it was about "creating a place where everyone can be who they want to be without judgement". Prior to the song's release, Hamilton posted snippets on social media from the song's music video. She performed the song for the first time at Pride Canterbury in June 2026, followed by a performance at Essex Pride the same month.

== Music video ==
An accompanying music video was released alongside "Garden of Eden" on the day of its release. Hamilton said that she "wanted to do something unexpected with the video", describing it as a "gothic fantasy". The video was filmed in and around the grounds of Crewe Hall. It begins with a series of shots of Hamilton including her inside the building, sat on a chair, stood outside the grounds of the hall and laying on greenery. The rotating shots continue up to the chorus, when Hamilton is seen picking up an apple and touching a black ball on a mantelpiece, after which her eyes are covered with black contact lenses as she attempts to take a bite of the apple. The rotating shots continue towards the end of the video with Hamilton seen performing choreography in and around the grounds. It concludes with Hamilton winking at the camera, one eye of which has a black contact lense in.

== Critical reception ==
The song was described by CultureFix as a "seductive pop gem that utilises the classic imagery of temptation in paradise." As well as "a slinky treat in which Hamilton's vocals impress, while production from Andy Gannon captures an elegant, danceable groove." Meanwhile, CelebMix said the song was a "shimmering, infectious anthem that has quickly become a talking point across social media."

== Personnel ==
Credits adapted from Spotify.

- Natasha Hamilton – vocals, songwriting
- Andy Gannon – production, songwriting
- Jonas Westling – mixing engineer

== Release history ==
Region	Date	Format	Label	Ref.
Various	3 July 2026	Digital download, streaming	Morpho Records	
