= White feather (disambiguation) =

The white feather is a traditional symbol of cowardice in many places, although it may have the opposite meaning in others.

White feather or white feathers may also refer to:

== WW1 Campaigns ==
- White Feather Campaign

== Films ==
- The White Feather, a lost 1913 short film featuring George Cooper
- White Feather (film), a 1955 Western starring Robert Wagner
- "The White Feather", an episode of the British television series Foyle's War
- White Feather Films, a production company based in Mumbai, India, co-founded by Sanjay Dutt and Sanjay Gupta

== Music ==
- White Feathers, the debut album of British new wave band Kajagoogoo
- "White Feather" (Wolfmother song), a song by Australian hard rock band Wolfmother
- White Feather (Natasha Hamilton song), a song by English singer Natasha Hamilton, from Extraction

== Other uses ==
- The White Feather (1907), a novel by P. G. Wodehouse
- The Man Who Stayed at Home (play), a 1914 play that was renamed The White Feather when performed in North America
- White Feather, the commercial version of the M25 sniper rifle, named after Carlos Hathcock (see below)

== See also ==
- Carlos Hathcock, US Marine sniper in the Vietnam War, nicknamed Lông Trắng du Kich (White Feather Sniper)
