= Natasha Hamilton =

English singer (born 1982)

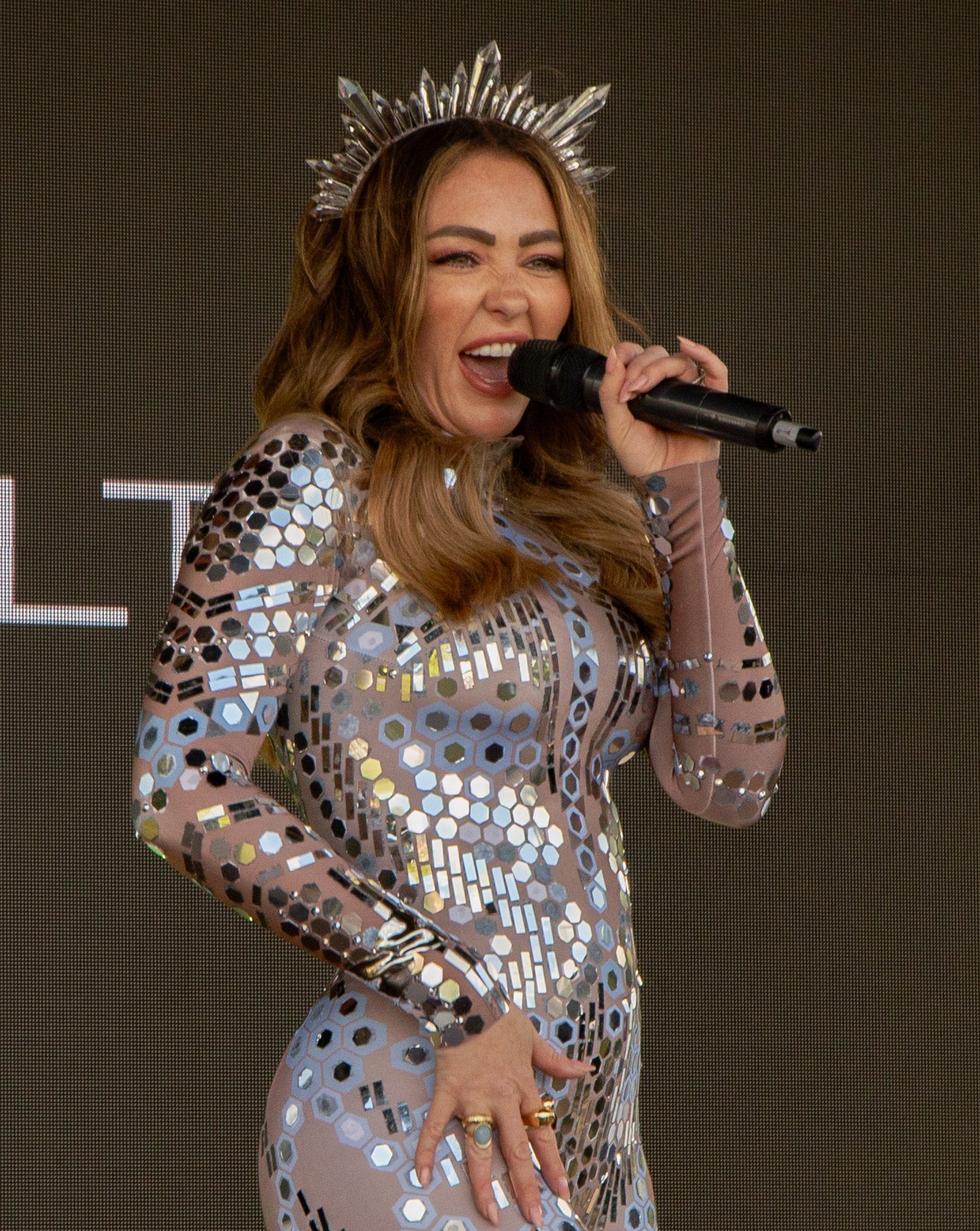
- Hamilton in 2025
- Born: Natasha Maria Hamilton; 17 July 1982 (age 44); Kensington, Liverpool, Merseyside, England
- Other name: Tash
- Occupations: Singer; actress
- Years active: 1999–present
- Spouses: Riad Erraji (m. 2006; div. 2013) Charles Gay (m. 2021)
- Children: 5
- Musical career
- Genre: Pop
- Instruments: Vocals
- Formerly of: Atomic Kitten
- Website: natashahamilton.com

Natasha Maria Hamilton (born 17 July 1982) is an English singer and actress, known for being a member of the girl group Atomic Kitten. She joined the group in 1999 and they released their first single the same year, going on to have three UK number one singles: "Whole Again" (2001), "Eternal Flame" (2001) and "The Tide Is High (Get the Feeling)" (2002), as well as two UK number one albums: Right Now (2000) and Feels So Good (2002). The group went on hiatus in 2008, during which Hamilton released the solo single "Ms. Emotional", before reuniting with her former colleagues for The Big Reunion in 2012.

Hamilton went on to appear as a housemate on the sixteenth series of Celebrity Big Brother in 2015 and was a cast member on The Real Housewives of Cheshire in 2023. She continued performing with Atomic Kitten until departing the group in 2024, releasing the solo singles "Edge of Us" and "You Don't Know Me" the same year. Since her departure from the group, she has released various singles, as well as her debut extended play, Extraction (2026).

== Early life ==
Hamilton was born on 17 July 1982 in Kensington, Liverpool to Maria (née Wright) and George Hamilton. She has a younger sister Georgina. She began singing and performing from the age of 12 in the Starlight Show Group. Her father is mixed race, being of white and black ancestry. Hamilton attended St Sebastian's Catholic Primary School, Liverpool, and then Broughton Hall High School, both situated in her home city of Liverpool.

== Career ==
=== 1999–2008: Atomic Kitten ===
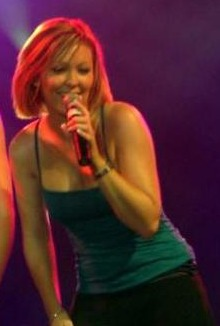
Hamilton performing with Atomic Kitten during a concert in Poland in August 2005

In May 1999, Hamilton joined Atomic Kitten, a girl group founded by OMD frontman Andy McCluskey, replacing Heidi Range who left the early line up. With Hamilton, Liz McClarnon and Kerry Katona, the group released their first record in 1999. Katona left the group in 2001 and was replaced by Jenny Frost. Atomic Kitten had three UK number one singles, "Whole Again", "Eternal Flame", and "The Tide Is High (Get the Feeling)". They also had two UK number one albums, Right Now, and Feels So Good, both being certified double-platinum in the UK for sales of more than 600,000 copies each. The total worldwide sales are estimated at 6.2 million singles and 4 million albums. Hamilton was also winner of the annual Rear of the Year award.

In 2006, Hamilton appeared on the BBC1's talent show Just the Two of Us, paired with Mark Moraghan, finishing in second place. Hamilton announced that she was recording solo songs and intended to release her first solo album in 2007, but she failed to sign with a label and the project was postponed. In 2007, under the nickname Tash, Hamilton was featured artist in Mischa Daniels's hit song "Round & Round", which samples Crystal Waters' "Gypsy Woman (She's Homeless)" and was included on the Ministry of Sound compilation Housexy: The Afterparty. Atomic Kitten went on hiatus in 2008.

=== 2009–2023: Other projects and Atomic Kitten reformation ===
In 2009, Hamilton appeared on Celebrity Come Dine with Me Celebrity. From December 2009 to January 2010, she played the title role in the musical Peter Pan at the Liverpool Empire.

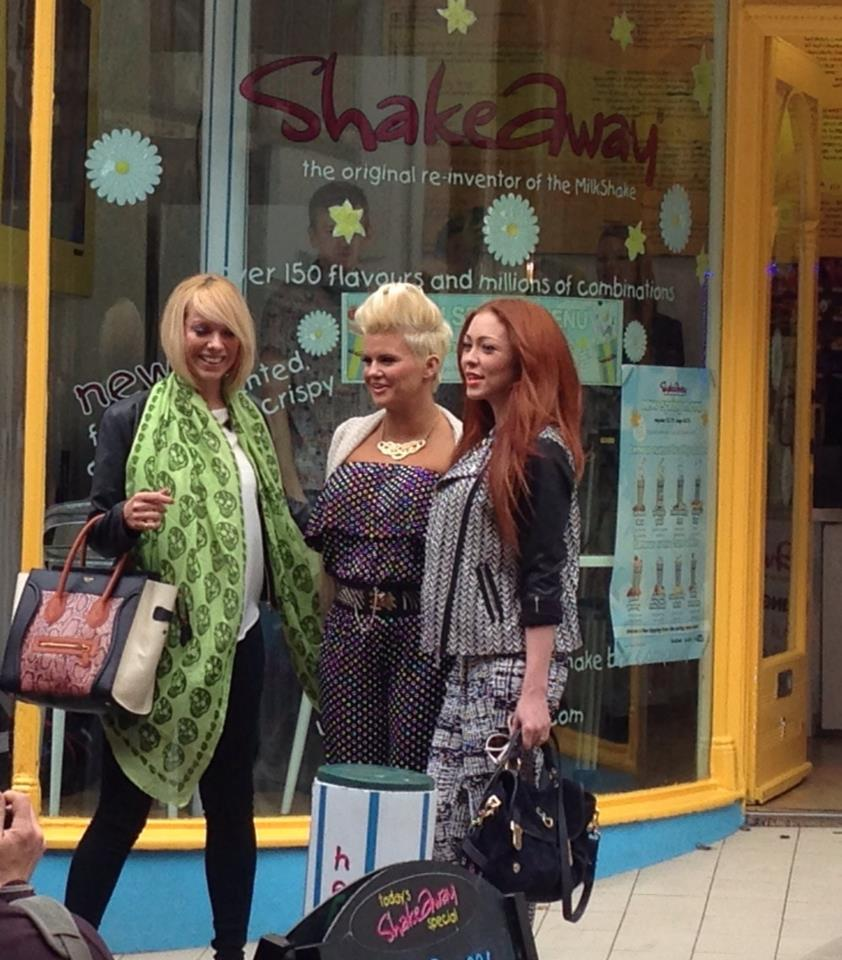
Hamilton (right) with her Atomic Kitten colleagues Liz McClarnon and Kerry Katona in May 2013, following their reformation

In October 2010, Hamilton released her debut single solo, "Ms. Emotional", as an independent artist. In the interview, she again announced her intention to release her debut solo album soon, but nothing happened. In 2011, she played Mrs Johnstone at the West End musical Blood Brothers. In 2012, Hamilton appeared as the title character in Cinderella in Southport theatre.

In 2013, the original line-up of Atomic Kitten – Hamilton, McClarnon and Katona – reformed for The Big Reunion, alongside five other pop groups of their time – 911, Honeyz, B*Witched, Five and Liberty X. They continued to perform together until Hamilton's departure in 2024. In 2015, Hamilton entered the Celebrity Big Brother house, as a housemate on the sixteenth series. She ultimately reached the final and finished in third place. In 2023, she appeared as a cast member on the reality docu-series The Real Housewives of Cheshire.

=== 2024–present: Solo music and Extraction ===
In May 2024, Hamilton released "Edge of Us", the lead single from her debut EP. She released a second single, "You Don't Know Me", from her debut EP, which remains untitled. In October 2024, Hamilton posted via her Instagram account that she would be leaving Atomic Kitten to focus on her solo projects. In January 2025, Hamilton released her next single "Burning Letters". In November 2025, she appeared in the documentary Girlbands Forever, detailing her experiences of being in Atomic Kitten. The following month, Hamilton announced that she had established her own record label titled Morpho Records.

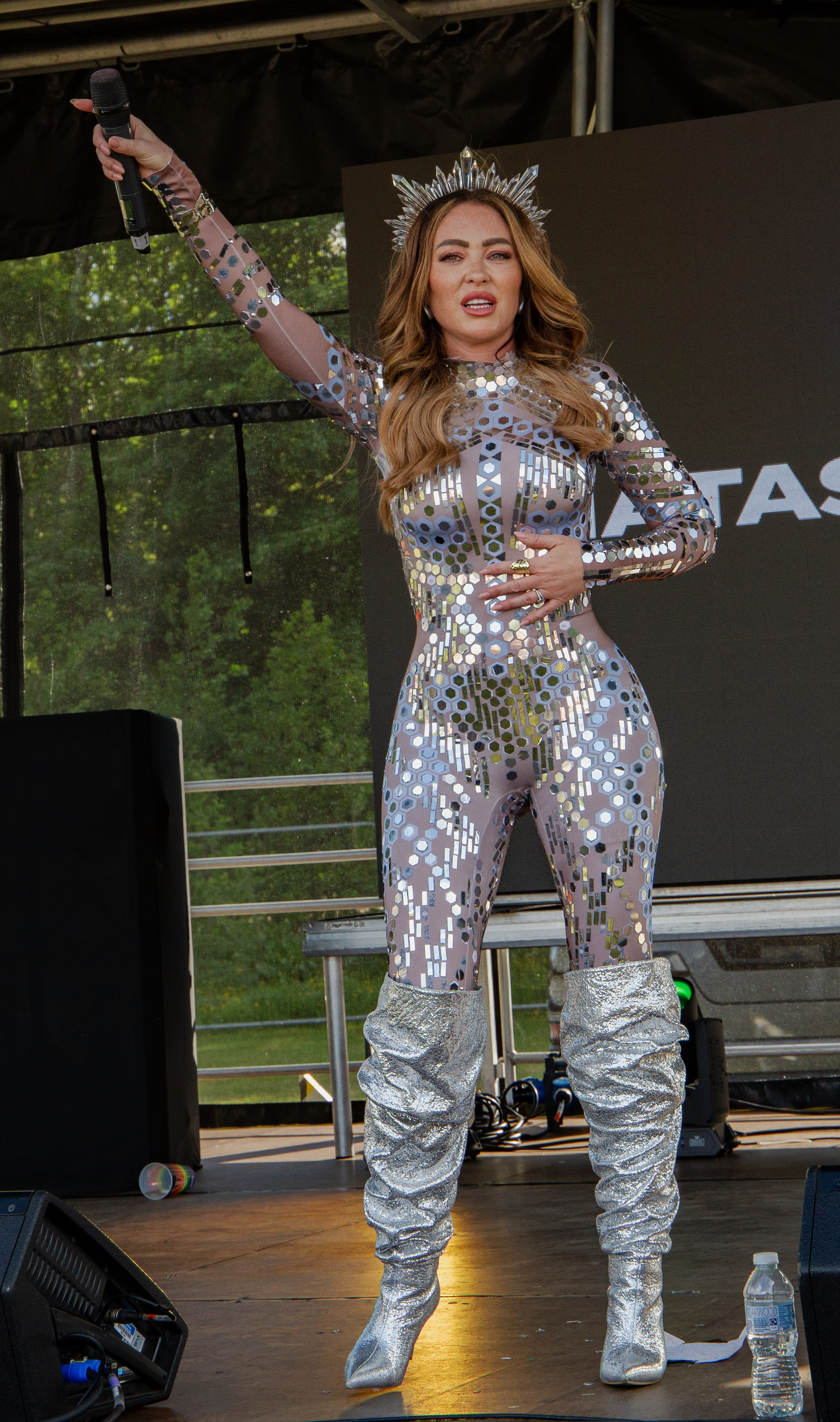
Hamilton performing at Durham Pride in May 2025

In January 2026, Hamilton released her next single "Numb". Speaking of the song, Hamilton stated that it was "written in that space where you realise survival isn't the same as living. It's about noticing when you've shut down emotionally and deciding to feel again, even when it's uncomfortable. This song marks a turning point for me creatively. It's honest, grounded and exactly where I am now." A music video, directed by James Longman, was released the same day. "Numb" was followed by the single "Fantasy" in March, as well as "White Feather" in May. All three singles were featured on her debut extended play (EP), Extraction (2026), as well as a fourth single "Garden of Eden".

== Personal life ==
From 2001 to 2002, Hamilton dated businessman Fran Cosgrave, with whom she had her first child in 2002. In 2003, she started dating professional dancer Gavin Hatcher, with whom she had her second child in 2004. They broke up briefly between July and December 2005, when Hamilton got back together with Cosgrave. Hamilton and Hatcher got back together from February 2005 to February 2006. In 2006, she started dating Riad Erraji and they were married on 23 November 2007 at Crewe Hall Hotel. In January 2008, Hamilton found out she was expecting her third child, but she miscarried after six weeks. Hamilton's third child was born on 14 June 2010. The couple announced their separation in July 2013.

From 2013 to March 2016, Hamilton dated singer Ritchie Neville, member of pop group Five, with whom she had her fourth child in 2014. On 28 November 2016, Hamilton announced her engagement to Charles Gay and the couple married in Lake Como, Italy, on 25 September 2021. In February 2023, Hamilton announced that she was expecting her fifth child, a girl, who was born six months later. In 2024, Hamilton was diagnosed with skin cancer after mistaking a mole for a mosquito bite whilst on holiday in Mallorca. She was subsequently declared cancer free after the tissue was removed.

== Discography ==
=== Extended plays ===
Title	Details
Extraction	Scheduled: 3 July 2026; Formats: Digital download, streaming, CD, Vinyl; Label: Morpho Records

=== Singles ===
==== As main artist ====
Title	Year	Album
"Ms. Emotional"	2010	Non-album singles
"Edge of Us"	2024	Non-album singles
"You Don't Know Me"	2024	Non-album singles
"Burning Letters"	2025	Non-album singles
"Numb"	2026	Extraction
"Fantasy"	2026	Extraction
"White Feather"	2026	Extraction
"Garden of Eden"	2026	Extraction

==== As featured artist ====
Title	Year	Album
"Round & Round" (Mischa Daniels featuring Tash)	2007	Non-album singles
"He Ain't Heavy, He's My Brother" (among Homeless Worldwide and Friends)	2019	Non-album singles
"I Can't Wait to Spend Christmas with You" (Tom Seals featuring Natasha Hamilton)	2020	Non-album singles

=== Guest appearances ===
Title	Year	Album
"You're My World"	2008	Liverpool: The Number Ones Album

== Filmography ==
=== Television ===
Year	Title	Role	Notes	Ref.
2006	Just the Two of Us	Contestant	Contestant; series 1	
2010	The Weakest Link	Contestant	Pop and Rock Special; winner	
2015	Celebrity Big Brother	Contestant	Housemate; series 16	
2023	The Real Housewives of Cheshire	Herself	Cast member; series 16	
2025	Girlbands Forever	Herself	Documentary	

== Stage ==
Year	Title	Role	Ref.
2009–2010	Peter Pan	Peter Pan	
2011	Blood Brothers	Mrs Johnstone	
2012	Cinderella	Cinderella	
2013	Rent	Maureen Johnson	
2017–2018	Fat Friends The Musical	Julia Fleshman	
