= White Feather (Natasha Hamilton song) =

2026 song by Natasha Hamilton

Single by Natasha Hamilton

from the EP Extraction
- Released: 22 May 2026
- Recorded: 2026
- Length: 3:05
- Label: Morpho Records
- Songwriters: Natasha Hamilton; Andy Gannon
- Producer: Andy Gannon

Natasha Hamilton singles chronology
"Fantasy" (2026)	"White Feather" (2026)	"Garden of Eden" (2026)

"White Feather" is a song by English singer and former Atomic Kitten member Natasha Hamilton. It was released on 22 May 2026 as the third single from her debut extended play, Extraction (2026). Written by Hamilton and Andy Gannon and produced by the latter, it was released via her record label, Morpho Records. Lyrically, the song is a tribute to Hamilton's grandmother and was described as "delicate yet powerful" by CelebMix. A music video was released alongside the single, featuring Hamilton and members of her family.

== Background and release ==
In January 2026, Hamilton began teasing new music and subsequently released the single "Numb". In March 2026, Hamilton announced her debut extended play (EP), Extraction, set for release on 3 July 2026, as well as releasing "Fantasy" as her next single the same day. The track list was subsequently confirmed and Hamilton revealed "White Feather" as her next single on 7 May. The song was written by Hamilton, along with Andy Gannon, the latter of whom also produced the track, and was released on 22 May 2026. Lyrically, the song is a tribute to Hamilton's grandmother, with Hamilton describing it as "a tribute to my Nan, who has been my guardian angel throughout my life. When I've been lost or uncertain, she's sent a sign and guided me." The cover art for the single, which depicts a white feather, was created by Liverpool-based artist John Charles. Speaking of the single's cover, Hamilton said she "knew the single cover for "White Feather" had to be different too, so I worked with the "incredibly talented" Charles. It was important for me to work with someone from Liverpool, and you just have to look at Charles' work to see why I chose him."

Prior to its release, Hamilton posted clips on social media of her reacting to the single's artwork, as well singing snippets of the song. Hamilton said of the single following its release, "I think in the world we're living in right now, people need hope. We need to believe there's something bigger guiding us through difficult moments. "White Feather" is about holding onto faith when life feels uncertain, but it's also about reconnecting with the innocence we lose along the way."

== Music video ==
An accompanying music video was released alongside "White Feather" on the day of its release, directed by James Longman. Hamilton's own family members were featured in the video. The video depicts Hamilton walking into a bar, where she is seen overlooking a family sat at a table holding a wake. Hamilton walks over to an old television and switches it on, after which she experiences flashbacks of her younger self (played by Hamilton's daughter Ella) singing and playing around the bar, before hugging her grandmother (played by Hamilton's mother Maria) and heading to the bar where the bartender (played by Hamilton's father George) hands her a white feather, which she places behind the television. In the present day, the television is seen being carried out by workmen, and the white feather from behind it drops on the floor, which Hamilton subsequently picks up and gives to the current bartender, before leaving the bar.

== Critical reception ==
Speaking of the single, Philip Logan of CelebMix described Hamilton to be "stepping into a more luminous chapter of her artistry" with the release of "White Feather". Logan noted a difference in the song from the "shadowy introspection and emotional unraveling" explored in Hamilton's earlier singles "Numb" and "Fantasy" and said the song felt like "a quiet breath of hope cutting through the darkness. Delicate yet powerful, the song captures the fragile moments of clarity that emerge in the aftermath of grief, heartbreak, and transformation – those subtle signs that remind us we are still being guided forward, even when life feels uncertain."

== Personnel ==
Credits adapted from Spotify.

- Natasha Hamilton – vocals, songwriting
- Andy Gannon – production, songwriting
- Jonas Wrestling – mixing engineer

== Release history ==
Region	Date	Format	Label	Ref.
Various	22 May 2026	Digital download, streaming	Morpho Records	
