= Exeter Pride =

Annual LGBTQ+ event in Exeter, Devon, England

- Frequency: Annually
- Locations: Exeter, Devon, England
- Founded: 2009; 17 years ago
- Next event: 9 May 2026
- Website: exeterpride.co.uk

Exeter Pride is an annual LGBTQ pride event and registered charity in the city of Exeter in Devon, England.

== History ==
The first Exeter Pride event took place in 2009.

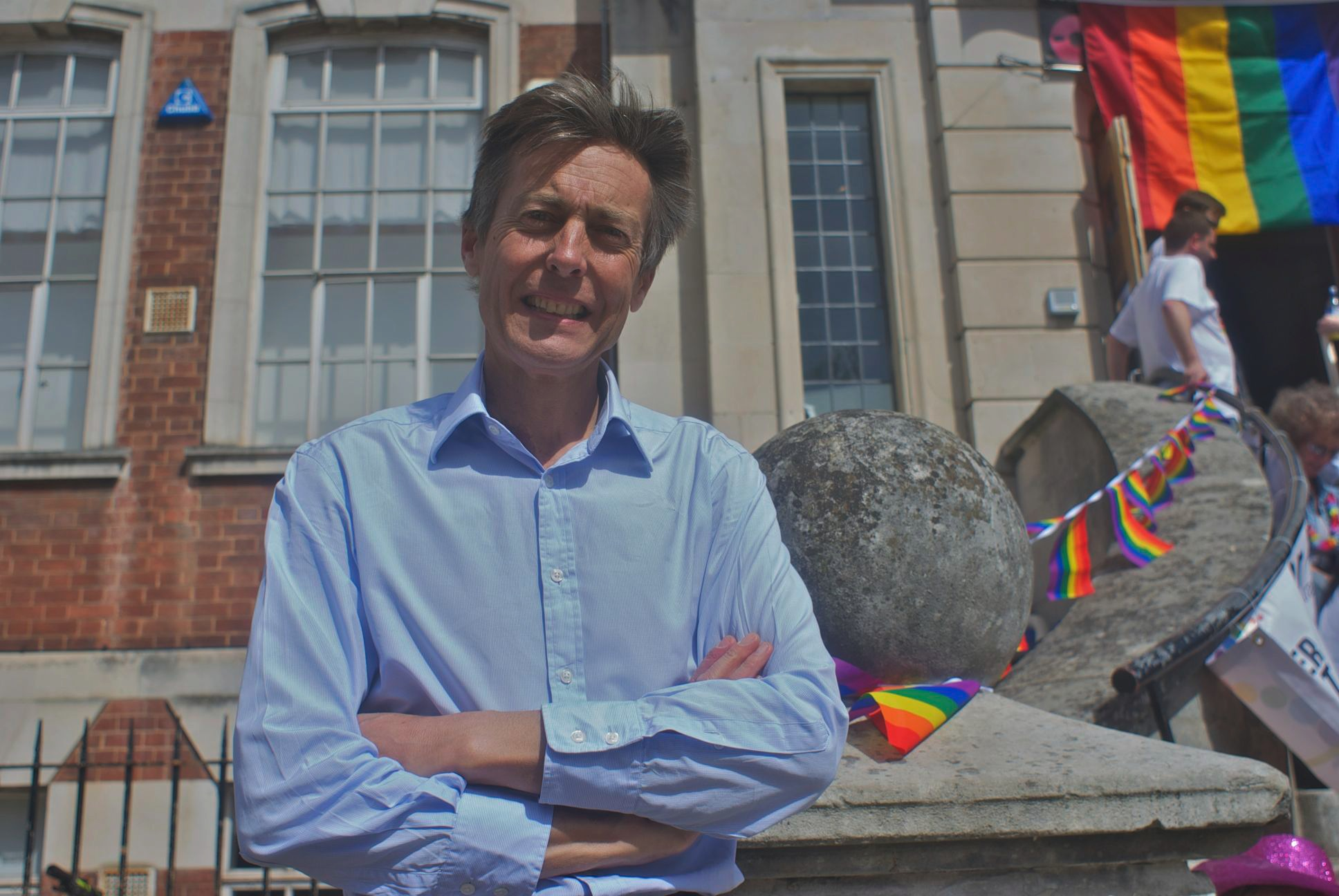
Labour MP Ben Bradshaw at Exeter Pride 2011

Hundreds attended the 2011 event on 9 April, with the Lord Mayor beginning the celebrations and leading the march. The parade ended in Gandy Street where free events and activities were set up. Debates concerning the Equality Act and homophobia in sport were held. This event was organised by Exeter LGBT, which included representatives from Devon County Council, the University of Exeter, and Devon and Cornwall Police. The 2012 Exeter Pride's parade proceeded down the High Street to the Exeter Phoenix. This included a 50-metre (160 ft) rainbow flag, and included firefighters and police. In 2013, Norwich Pride used the 50-metre flag for its own parade. Exeter Pride became a registered charity in March 2015.

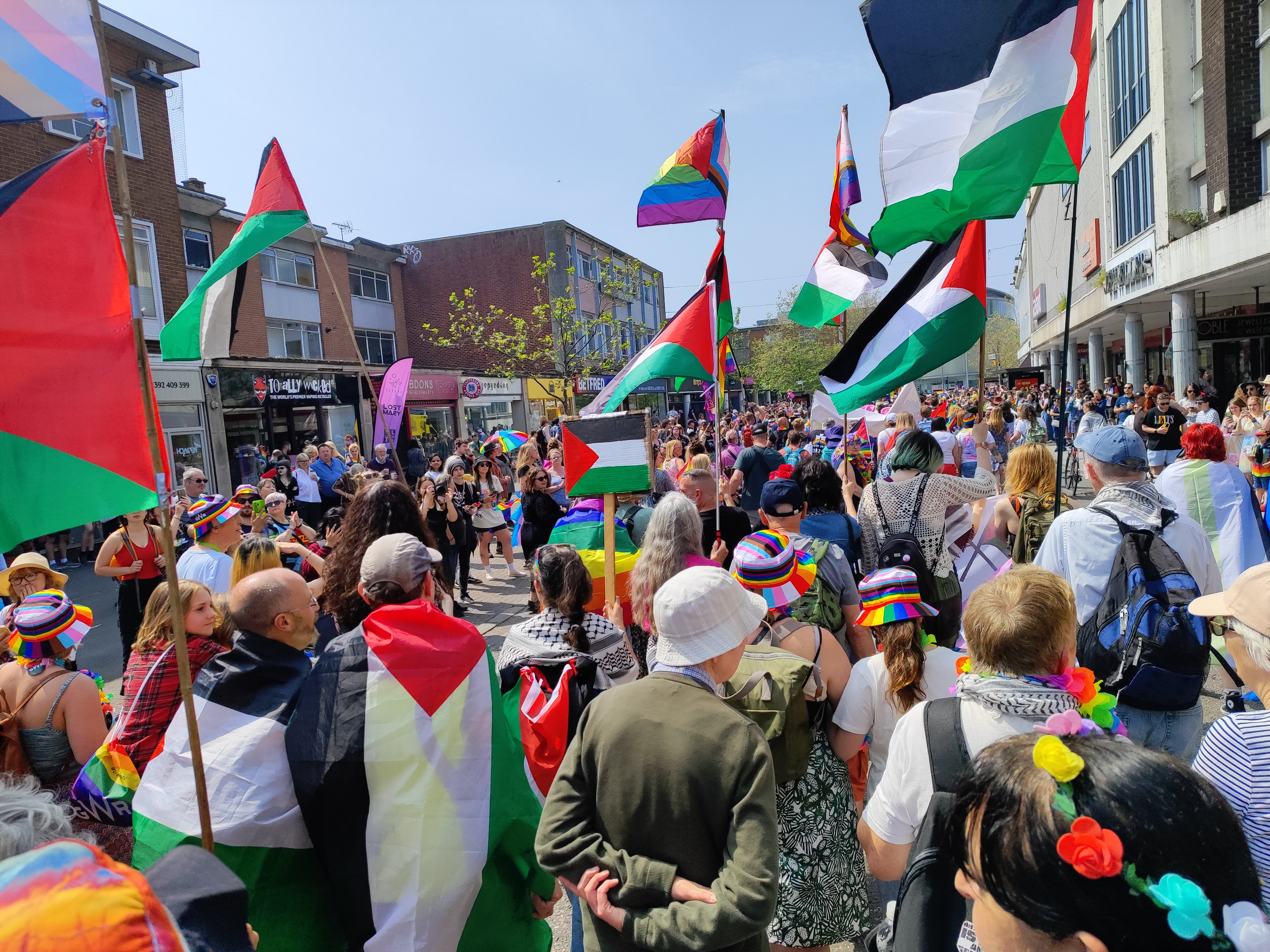
Palestine flags at the 2024 parade

The event was cancelled in 2023; its chair, Katie Moudry, has said that the charity lacked both committee members and financial support. She also stated that this cancellation "really made people sit up and realise this isn't just going to happen, we're going to have to start supporting Exeter Pride to enable it to go on." In 2024, Exeter Pride returned after its hiatus, the march taking place from Sidwell Street to Northernhay Gardens on 11 May. About 2,000 people turned out for the march itself. For the 2025 event on 10 May, which received a £20,000 grant from The National Lottery Community Fund, nearly 10,000 people were expected to attend with almost 2,000 expected to engage in the march. Activities were expected to take place in Rougemont Gardens, at the Royal Albert Memorial Museum, and at the Exeter Phoenix. Events included a family-friendly drag show and the event's first ever dog show.
