= King's Lynn and West Norfolk Pride =

Annual LGBTQ+ event in King's Lynn, England

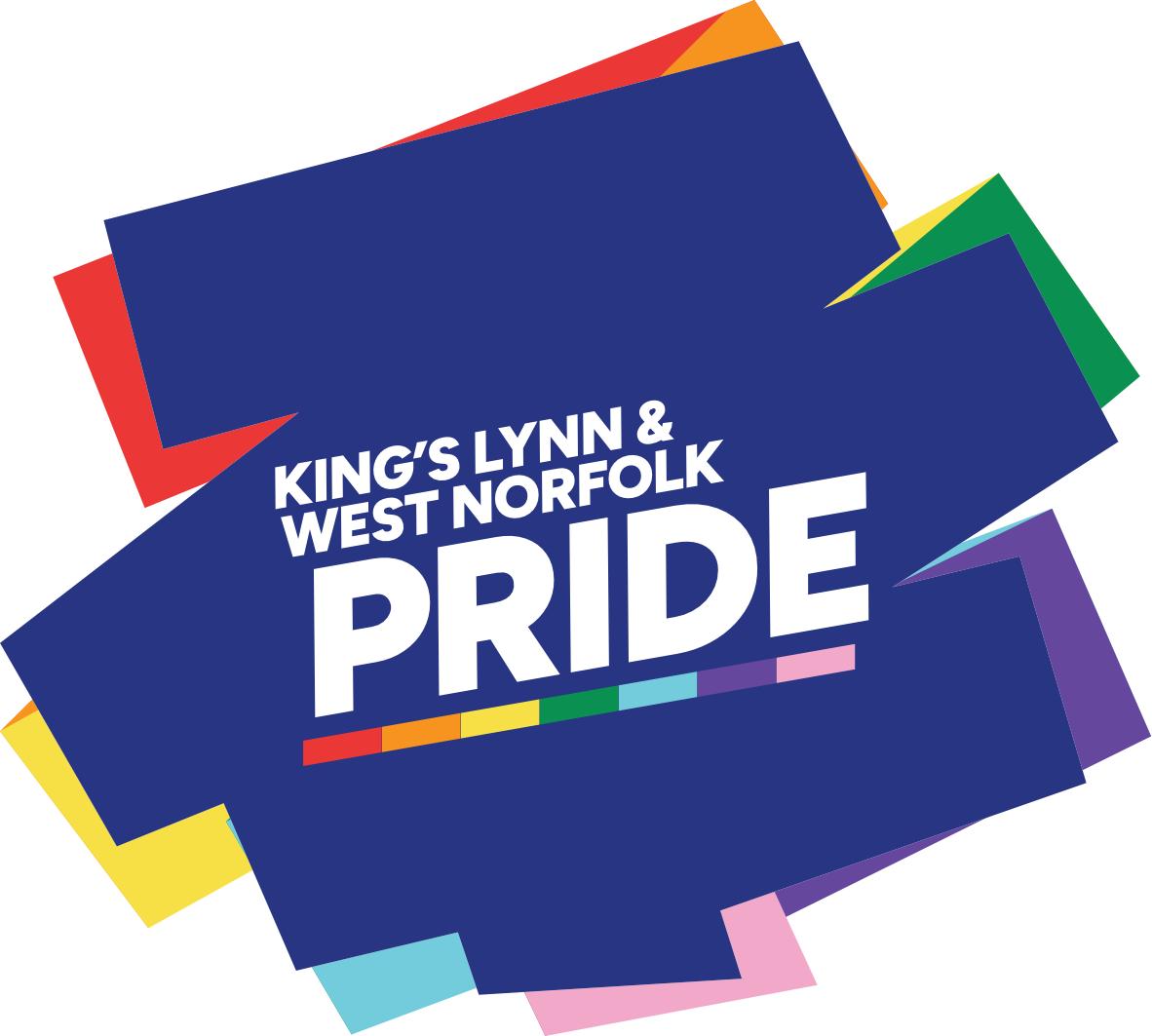

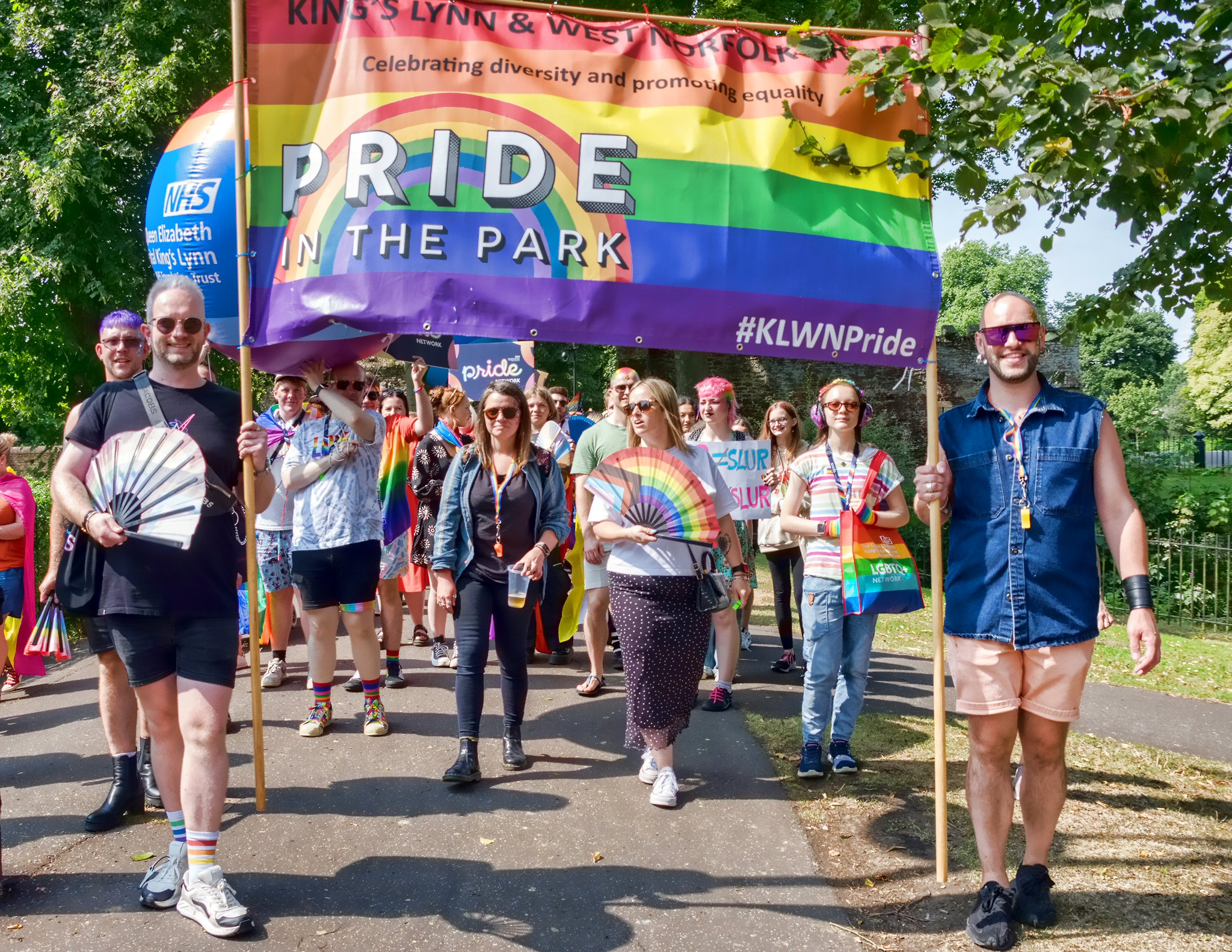
- The annual Pride parade entering The Walks, King's Lynn.

- Area served by King's Lynn and West Norfolk Pride
- Founded: 2018; 8 years ago
- Region served: King's Lynn & West Norfolk
- Website: klwnpride.org

King's Lynn and West Norfolk Pride is a community organisation in the town of King's Lynn, England, intended to serve the borough of King's Lynn and West Norfolk. They also organise an annual LGBTQIA+ pride parade through King's Lynn.

== History ==
King's Lynn Pride was first established when founders Josh Elms and Jo Rust attended Norwich Pride in 2017, and decided to host an event for King's Lynn while on the journey home. This coincided with a peak in popularity for Norwich Pride, which saw over 10,000 people attend its 10th anniversary event in July 2018. Rust has stated that the event was not intended as a protest but instead as a celebration, and Elms has spoken on the event's intention to highlight that West Norfolk, which is more rural than Norwich, "has a diversity and a rich community".

The first King's Lynn Pride took place on 18 August 2018, with 600 people expected to turn out. Organisers described the actual number of attendees as "unprecedented", an estimated 1,000 people attending according to Elms, over double the number expected. According to online analytics, over 50% of attendees were from West Norfolk and 40% were specifically from King's Lynn. The 2019 event took place on 17 August.

King's Lynn Pride was cancelled in 2020 and 2021 due to the COVID-19 pandemic. The event returned in 2022 with a turnout of around 2,500 people. The event was hosted by drag queen Titania Trust and supported by West Norfolk Police. The 2024 parade, now under the name King's Lynn and West Norfolk Pride, took place on 20 August, again hosted by Titania Trust. It began at 10am and included a parade through King's Lynn's town centre and a free festival at the Walks. An after-party until the early morning also took place.
