= Bourne Free =

Annual LGBT event in Bournemouth, England

- Official logo of the festival
- Frequency: annually
- Location: Bournemouth
- Inaugurated: 2004
- Website: www.bournefree.co.uk

Bourne Free is an annual three-day pride festival and charity organization in Bournemouth, England. It started in 2004 and has run yearly since, save for 2020. Past themes for the event include "Paint the World with your Pride" (2019) and "Stronger Together" (2021).

== History ==
=== 2000s ===
The festival was established in 2004 when a far right organisation was due to come to Bournemouth to demonstrate against homosexuality. Many prominent figures and active members of the LGBT community in the area came together to organise an event in the Lower Gardens to defend LGBT people from the event and create a day of celebration rather than hostility. As it took place in October, the event was linked to the 150th anniversary of Oscar Wilde's birth.

The event included entertainment at The Bandstand, a balloon release with a two-minute silence for victims of hate crime, and Bournemouth's first Gay Pride march. The Bourne Free committee that had organised the event continued organising Bourne Free as an annual charity event. In 2006, event was renamed as the Bourne Free Pride Festival.

In 2008 the Pride Parade moved onto the streets of Bournemouth. An estimated more than 4,000 people attended the event that year. The festival theme for 2008 was "Support our Services"

=== 2010s ===
LGBT+ pedestrian crossings in Bournemouth, 2018.

In 2011, the parade had an award for "best dressed" to honor Steve Collier, who had passed away the previous November. Collier had been part of the volunteer team that organized Bourne Free as well as an event trustee.

Kerry Katona was one of the headline acts for Bourne Free 2012, with the theme of the festival being "Royal".

For Pride 2018, Bourne Free partnered with Siemens Mobility to design and replace twenty pedestrian crossing signals in the town centre ahead of the festival. They were inspired by an initiative from London Pride in 2016, and the installations in Bournemouth would inspire a similar initiative in Manchester later that year. Bourne Free and Siemens would partner again in 2019.

=== 2020s ===
In 2020 the event was postponed due to the COVID-19 pandemic. A virtual pride was held on July 4th on Bourne Free's Facebook page. The event returned in person in 2021, with capacity halved to 1,500 to reduce risk. Organizers of Bourne Free 2021 also distributed hand sanitizer and facemasks to attendees.

The theme for 2024 was intended to be "Eurovision" but the organisers scrapped this theme due to the Gaza war, and controversy around Israel's participation in the Eurovision contest. The theme for 2024 was ultimately changed, with the website stating "There is no theme this year. Be you – the vibrant, colourful, beautiful, YOU!"

In 2026, the Bourne Free charity partnered with Oceanarium Bournemouth, a local oceanarium, to host a conservation talk at Meyrick Park as part Pride Family Day.
