= You Don't Know Me (Natasha Hamilton song) =

2024 song by Natasha Hamilton

Single by Natasha Hamilton
- Released: 12 September 2024
- Recorded: 2024
- Genre: Synth-pop
- Length: 3:11
- Label: Morpho Records
- Songwriters: Jada Celine Freeman; Natasha Hamilton; Jemimah Marie Haughton; Oluwabukumi Anthony Ologun

Natasha Hamilton singles chronology
| "Edge of Us" (2024) | "You Don't Know Me" (2024) | "Burning Letters" (2025) |

"You Don't Know Me" is a song by English singer and Atomic Kitten member Natasha Hamilton. It was written by Hamilton, along with Jada Celine Freeman, Jemimah Marie Haughton and Oluwabukumi Anthony Ologun, and was released on 12 September 2024.

== Background and release ==
In May 2024, Hamilton released "Edge of Us", her first solo single in fourteen years. "You Don't Know Me" was released on 12 September 2025, and was written by Hamilton, along with Jada Celine Freeman, Jemimah Marie Haughton and Oluwabukumi Anthony Ologun. Addressing the meaning behind the song, Hamilton said it was a "two fingers up to the haters, the judges, the jealousy, and the damn right rude! Go live your life, work on you, you don't have anything to prove to anyone but yourself."

== Music video ==
Hamilton filmed a music video for the single, which debuted a week after the song's release. It features Hamilton sat on a sofa reading a book whilst a group of dancers sat in suits at a table appear deliberate. The scene of Hamilton switches throughout the song and she is seen in dark clothing and make-up with the scene trashed, before it switches back to Hamilton undertaking other activities including writing in a book at a desk and holding a glass of wine. Halfway through the video, Hamilton wearing a green dress, begins to perform choreography, with the scenes continuing to switch, one of which features Hamilton screaming and biting into something. It concludes with Hamilton speaking into a microphone and wearing sunglasses as she delivers the final line.

== Critical reception ==
Reviewing the single, Fame Magazine described the song as "empowering" and "driven by thumping electronic rhythms, noting that Hamilton "channels raw emotion, bottling the essence of rebel spirit, grit, and staying power into a musical middle finger to the doubters and naysayers." CelebMix described the song as "a fearless and infectious, synth-infused pop anthem that hits hard with its message of self-empowerment."

== Personnel ==
- Natasha Hamilton – vocals, songwriting
- Jada Celine Freeman – production, songwriting
- Jemimah Marie Haughton – production, songwriting
- Oluwabukumi Anthony Ologun – production, songwriting

== Release history ==
| Region | Date | Format | Label | Ref. |
|---|---|---|---|---|
| Various | 12 September 2024 | Digital download, streaming | Morpho Records | |
