= Plymouth Pride =

Annual LGBTQ festival in Plymouth, England

- Frequency: Annual
- Locations: Plymouth, Devon, England
- Inaugurated: 2012
- Website: plymouthpride.co.uk

Plymouth Pride is an annual LGBTQ pride event in the city of Plymouth in Devon, England. The common route of its parade is a journey between the city centre and the Plymouth Hoe. As of 2025, organisers estimated that it usually had an estimate of 6,000 to 7,000 attendees.

== History ==
Plymouth Pride was launched in 2012, originally centered on Devonport Park.

The 2018 parade went ahead despite rain.

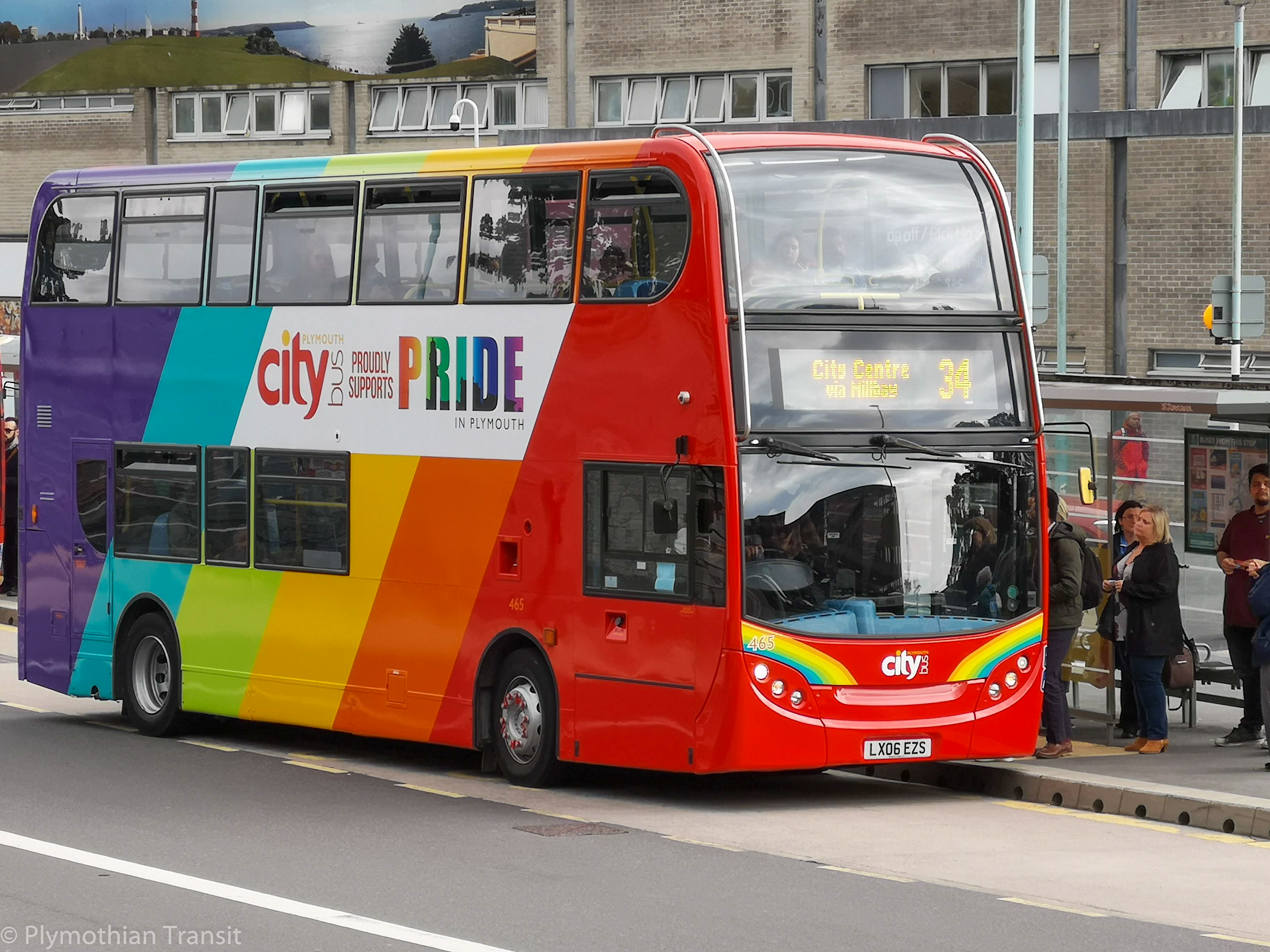
Plymouth Citybus unveiled a Pride-themed bus in 2019

For Pride in Plymouth 2019, Drake Circus shopping centre redecorated its steps in rainbow colours. Despite the announcement from Pride in Plymouth directors that the event itself would not go ahead due to a storm warning, Plymouth Citybus unveiled a multicoloured Pride-themed bus as part of its fleet.

In 2021, Pride in Plymouth campaigners broadcast their intentions to raise £500 for a plaque, willow tree and dedication event in Central Park to honor Terry Sweet and Bernard Hawken, two gay men who were the victims of a 1995 attack by three men who murdered Sweet. Luke Pollard, the first openly gay Plymouth MP, supported this effort.

Marking the event's 10th anniversary, Plymouth Pride 2022 was hosted by Plymouth Albion R.F.C. which allowed the event to become economically sustainable for the first time, with the parade beginning at Devonport Park as it did in 2012, at 12:30 pm. The parade went ahead amidst high temperatures, and the event itself lasted two days for the first time. Events included live music, rugby skills workshops and a discussion with Luke Pollard. Following this event, organisers raised concerns that the event was less visible than other Pride events, and began rethinking its future, resolving to turn Pride in Plymouth into the Pride in Plymouth Community Trust with more of a focus on the entirety of the year rather than just the Pride event itself. Following its incorporation in December 2022, Plymouth Pride CIC (Community Interest Company), led by community director Juliet Williams, took over the organisation of Plymouth Pride.

Following a public meeting with Plymouth residents, organizers relocated the 2023 festival to Central Park, partly in an effort to reclaim the space after the 1995 attack on Sweet and Hawken. Plymouth Pride 2023 was eventually scaled back as a result of concerns around strong winds causing "flying gazebos".

Plymouth Pride 2024 cost over £33,500 to organise, and featured a march to the city centre from the Plymouth Hoe starting at 11 am as well as a main festival in the nearby Central Park with tribute acts, drag performers, fairground rides, and over 70 market stalls.

In 2025, organisers of Plymouth Pride announced that they were £12,000 short of the estimate of £35,000 needed to run that year's Pride due to rising costs for security, first aid and toilet facilities as well as a drop in grant funding; a funding application with the National Lottery had been unsuccessful. As a result, Plymouth Pride did not officially hold its annual event in 2025. A smaller group named Plymouth Community Pride instead raised funds to host a different Pride event in the city. This event, on 12 July, was led by organisations and businesses that included Queer Out Loud, the Barbican Theatre and Deart Promotions, plus volunteers and other supporters.

In 2026, plans by the Labour Party-led Plymouth City Council to fly the Progress pride flag outside Plymouth Guildhall for LGBTQ History Month in February were accused of being "unlawful" by the Christian Legal Centre and For Women Scotland. Plymouth city council replied that it "does not consider the rainbow flag or the trans flag to be connected to any political party. It is a flag that represents people."
