= Ms. Emotional =

2010 song by Natasha Hamilton

Single by Natasha Hamilton
- Released: 30 October 2010
- Recorded: 2010
- Genre: Pop
- Length: 3:40
- Songwriters: Natasha Hamilton; Toby Gad; Jim Beanz
- Producers: Toby Gad; Jim Beanz

Natasha Hamilton singles chronology
"Round & Round" (2007)	"Ms. Emotional" (2010)	"Edge of Us" (2024)

"Ms. Emotional" is a song by English singer and former Atomic Kitten member Natasha Hamilton. It was written by Hamilton, along with Toby Gad and Jim Beanz who also produced the track, and was released on 30 October 2010.

== Background and release ==
Hamilton joined the girl group Atomic Kitten in 1999, and remained with them until they went on hiatus in 2008. She had featured on the track "Round & Round" by Mischa Daniels the previous year under the name "Tash", and subsequently announced the single and plans for an album in 2009. In an interview, Hamilton said: "I am working on my solo career. I've been in New York recording my album, working with producers who've worked with Timbaland and Beyoncé. It's been so exciting. [...] "My first single is called "Miss Emotional", which is fitting as I'm always crying. It's a song I wrote about getting over the bad times and being strong. It will hopefully be out before the summer." She subsequently released "Ms. Emotional" as her debut solo single on 30 October 2010. The song was produced by Toby Gad and Jim Beanz, who wrote the track alongside Hamilton.

== Music video ==
Hamilton filmed a music video alongside the single. It features her walking along sand dunes before emerging on to a beach. She sits amongst the dunes whilst writing in a notebook. During the video, the scenes switch from the beach to Hamilton singing in front of a white background. At the end of the video, Hamilton places a message in a bottle and runs towards the shore.

== Personnel ==
- Natasha Hamilton – vocals, songwriting
- Toby Gad – production, songwriting
- Jim Beanz – production, songwriting

== Release history ==
Region	Date	Format	Label	Ref.
Various	30 October 2010	Digital download, streaming	—N/a	
