= Edge of Us =

2024 song by Natasha Hamilton

Single by Natasha Hamilton
- Released: 31 May 2024
- Recorded: 2024
- Genre: Pop
- Length: 3:32
- Label: Morpho Records
- Songwriters: Gaby Gerlis; Natasha Hamilton; Lee Hing-Coa; Dominic Husbands; Ben Wynter

Natasha Hamilton singles chronology
"Ms. Emotional" (2010)	"Edge of Us" (2024)	"You Don't Know Me" (2024)

"Edge of Us" is a song by English singer and Atomic Kitten member Natasha Hamilton. It was written by Hamilton, along with Gaby Gerlis, Lee Hing-Coa, Dominic Husbands and Ben Wynter, and was released on 31 May 2024. The song marks Hamilton's first solo release in 14 years, and the first under her own label Morpho Records.

== Background and release ==
Hamilton released a single "Ms. Emotional in 2010, during her hiatus from the band Atomic Kitten. She later reunited with the group in 2012 during The Big Reunion. Hamilton released "Edge of Us" on 31 May 2024, marking her first solo release in fourteen years. Speaking about the song, Hamilton said it "marks a thrilling homage to the torturous feelings that haunt you when it comes to the end of a relationship. It delves into the depths of all emotions and feelings, yet ultimately celebrates the courage to say "enough" and walk away from what no longer aligns with you. This song resonates as a powerful anthem of resilience, inspiring people to embrace their inner strength and make bold, transformative choices." Hamilton went on to release a remixed version of the song with DJ Illatek, which was released on 22 August 2024.

== Music video ==
Hamilton debuted an accompanying music video a week after the single's release, which features various different scenes of her performing choreography alongside backing dancers. The first of which features her stood on a plinth in a white and gold outfit wearing a full length veil, whilst the second part features a red back drop with Hamilton in a black outfit and a puffa jacket. The next scene features Hamilton in another black outfit, in a room surrounded by fans. Hamilton is the seen reaching for a pair of red gloves, ahead of the next scene in which she is wearing them with a black outfit and a red belt. Another scene features Hamilton in a bodysuit in which she performs slower and sultrier choreography, with the scenes switching throughout the course of the video.

== Critical reception ==
"Edge of Us" was described as a "dancefloor ready number that delves into the themes of love, loss and personal growth." Entertainment Focus noted that the song mirrored Hamilton's "own personal experiences as she reflects on past struggles and the transformative power of self-discovery via a kaleidoscopic dance-pop lens."

== Personnel ==
- Natasha Hamilton – vocals, songwriting
- Gaby Gerlis – production, songwriting
- Lee Hing-Coa – production, songwriting
- Dominic Husbands – production, songwriting
- Ben Wynter – production, songwriting

== Release history ==
Region	Date	Format	Label	Ref.
Various	31 May 2024	Digital download, streaming	Morpho Records	
