= Burning Letters =

2025 song by Natasha Hamilton

Single by Natasha Hamilton
- Released: 31 January 2025
- Recorded: 2025
- Genre: Pop
- Length: 3:20
- Label: Morpho Records
- Songwriters: Natasha Hamilton; Paul James Visser
- Producer: Goldcrush

Natasha Hamilton singles chronology
"You Don't Know Me" (2024)	"Burning Letters" (2025)	"Numb" (2026)

"Burning Letters" is a song by English singer and former Atomic Kitten member Natasha Hamilton. It was produced by Goldcrush and written by Hamilton and Paul James Visser. The song was released on 31 January 2025 and marked Hamilton's first solo release since her departure from Atomic Kitten.

== Background and release ==
Following the release of her singles "Edge of Us" and "You Don't Know Me" the previous year, Hamilton announced her departure fro from the girl group Atomic Kitten after 25 years. "Burning Letters" was released on 31 January 2025, written by Hamilton along with Paul James Visser, and was produced by Goldcrush. Speaking of the song, Hamilton said the song was written about "a very specific situation [she found herself] in, when a past relationship of mine ended abruptly. Describing it as "a song about heartbreak, but in not in the general sense, it's very much a track that tells [her] story as [she] saw it. Hamilton said she wanted to paint a picture of what it was really like for her in that moment, by writing lyrics that would convey to anyone listening exactly what was happening, minute by minute, so that they would feel like they were right there with [her].

== Critical reception ==
Philip Logan of CelebMix described the song as a "deeply emotive track" and noted that it had a "tangible sense of both fragility and strength", noting that it showcased Hamilton's "artistic and personal growth, as she rejects any notion of self-pity or victim mentality, proving herself to be the ultimate survivor."

== Personnel ==
- Natasha Hamilton – vocals, songwriting
- Paul James Visser – production, songwriting

== Release history ==
Region	Date	Format	Label	Ref.
Various	31 January 2025	Digital download, streaming	Morpho Records	
