= Fantasy (Natasha Hamilton song) =

2026 song by Natasha Hamilton

Single by Natasha Hamilton

from the EP Extraction
- Released: 13 March 2026
- Recorded: 2026
- Length: 2:54
- Label: Morpho Records
- Songwriters: Kyle Falconer; Andy Gannon; Natasha Hamilton
- Producer: Andy Gannon

Natasha Hamilton singles chronology
| "Numb" (2026) | "Fantasy" (2026) | "White Feather" (2026) |

"Fantasy" is a song by English singer and former Atomic Kitten member Natasha Hamilton. It was released on 13 March 2026 as the second single from her debut extended play Extraction. Written by Hamilton, Kyle Falconer and Andy Gannon, and produced by the latter, it was released via her record label, Morpho Records. A music video was released alongside it. The Official Charts Company praised the track, labelling it an "atmospheric banger", as well as CultureFix calling it "empowering".

== Background and release ==
In January 2026, Hamilton began teasing new music and subsequently released the single "Numb". In March 2026, Hamilton announced her debut extended play (EP), Extraction, set for release on 19 June 2026, as well as confirming "Fantasy" as her next single, which was released on 13 March 2026. Speaking about the single's meaning, Hamilton said "At its heart, "Fantasy" is about connection – not just to someone else, but to yourself. 'To get back to you' is about realignment. It's about choosing strength when things feel uncertain. This isn't about returning to who I was. It's about stepping fully into who I am now. The song was written by Hamilton, along with Kyle Falconer and Andy Gannon, the latter of whom also produced the track, and was released on 13 March 2026.

== Music video ==
Hamilton released an accompanying music video alongside the single, directed by James Longman and produced by Ross Thompson. The video begins with Hamilton in a rhinestoned outfit and headpiece, performing choreography accompanied by contemporary dancers, who appear consistently throughout the video. Hamilton is also seen lying on a white circle, resembling a moon, surrounded by a galaxy. During the middle of the video, a blue theme begins and Hamilton is stood against a wall with the title "Fantasy" projected onto it. The choreography continues, with Hamilton and the dancers now in black outfits. As the song reaches its bridge, one of the female dancers is seen waving her hands around a yellow spotlight. Towards the end of the video, a compilation of various shots featuring Hamilton and the dancers interchange and concludes with Hamilton laying on the circle.

== Critical reception ==
The Official Charts Company billed "Fantasy" as an "atmospheric banger", while CultureFix described it as an "empowering" track.

== Personnel ==
Credits adapted from Spotify.

- Natasha Hamilton – vocals, songwriting
- Kyle Falconer – production, songwriting
- Andy Gannon – production, songwriting
- Jonas Wrestling – mixing engineer

== Release history ==
| Region | Date | Format | Label | Ref. |
|---|---|---|---|---|
| Various | 13 March 2026 | Digital download, streaming | Morpho Records | |
