= Norwich Pride =

Annual LGBTQ+ event in Norwich, England

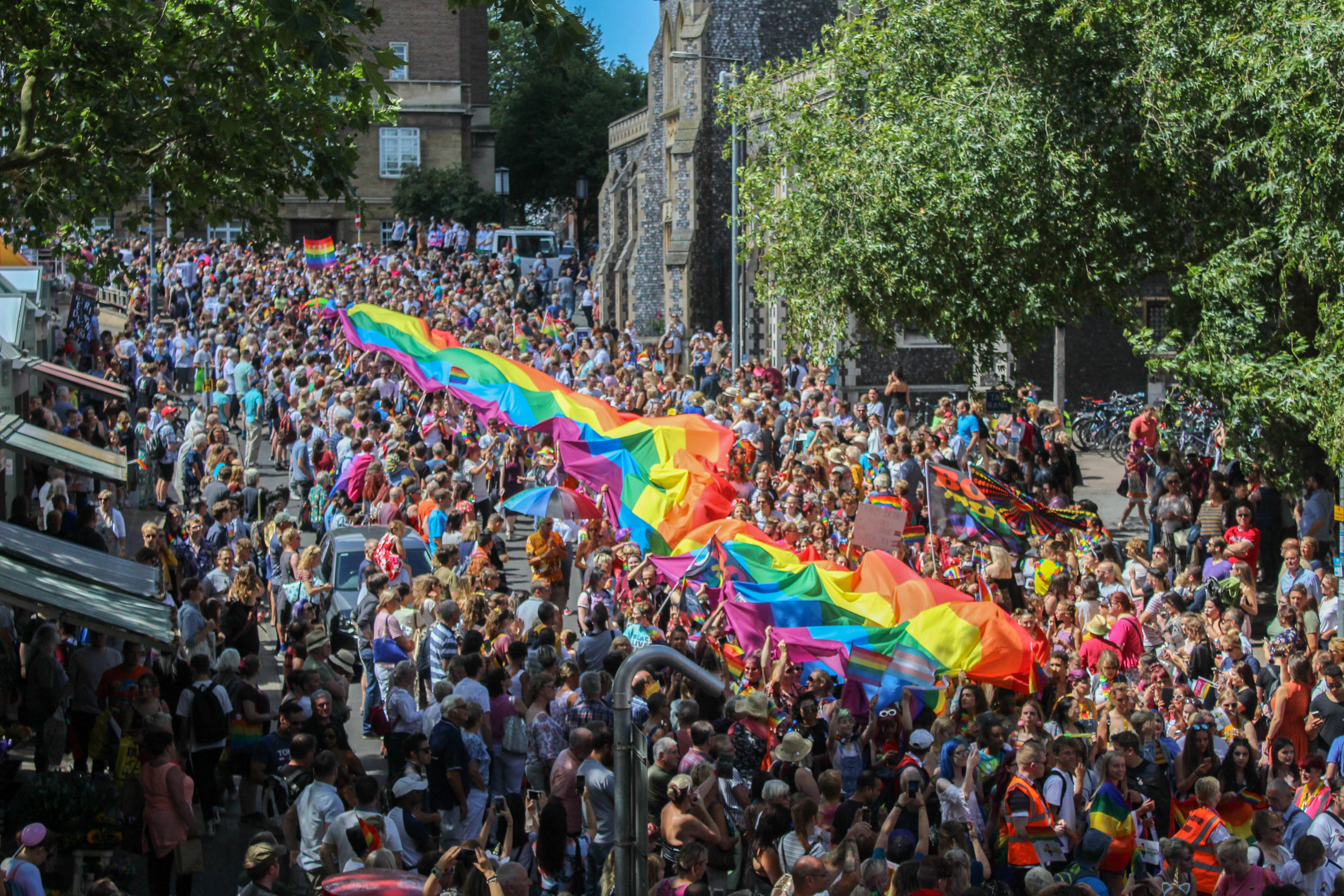
- The 50-metre "rainbow river" pride flag by Norwich Guildhall at Norwich Pride 2018
- Frequency: Annually
- Locations: Norwich, England
- Founded: 2009; 17 years ago
- Founders: Julie Bremner; Michelle Savage
- Most recent: 26 July 2025
- Next event: 25 July 2026
- Website: norwichpride.org.uk

Norwich Pride is an annual LGBTQ pride event and registered charity in the city of Norwich, England. It organises a pride parade from City Hall to Chapelfield Gardens, where it is often centred, as well as associated events on the last Saturday in July each year.

The organisation was first founded in 2008 by Julie Bremner and Michelle Savage, with its first event starting on 24 July 2009 with around 3,000 attendees. The event obtained sponsorships over the course of the 2010s, and participants increased to an estimated 10,000 by 2019. It became a registered charity in 2020, and it was temporarily cancelled for two years due to the COVID-19 pandemic in 2020 and 2021. Changes in sponsorship have taken place in 2024 and 2025.

== History ==
=== 2008–09: Founding and first event ===
Norwich Pride was founded in 2008 by Julie Bremner and Michelle Savage. Bremner was politically active from 10 years of age in 1979, being a member of ACT UP in the 1980s. She became a Norwich resident after attending the University of East Anglia from 1987, and went to her first pride marches in London in the 1990s. Savage was a school counsellor as of 2018, and Bremner was a civil servant and worked at Future Radio as of 2023. The two have stated that they were "fed up with austerity"; Bremner has since said she was "angry about the banking crisis that had led to the whole country paying for other people's crimes, but wanted to harness that energy to do something positive," and wanted Norwich "to feel more like a city [she] belonged in." The idea for Norwich Pride began with an email from Bremner to Savage, asking if she would like to organise such an event.

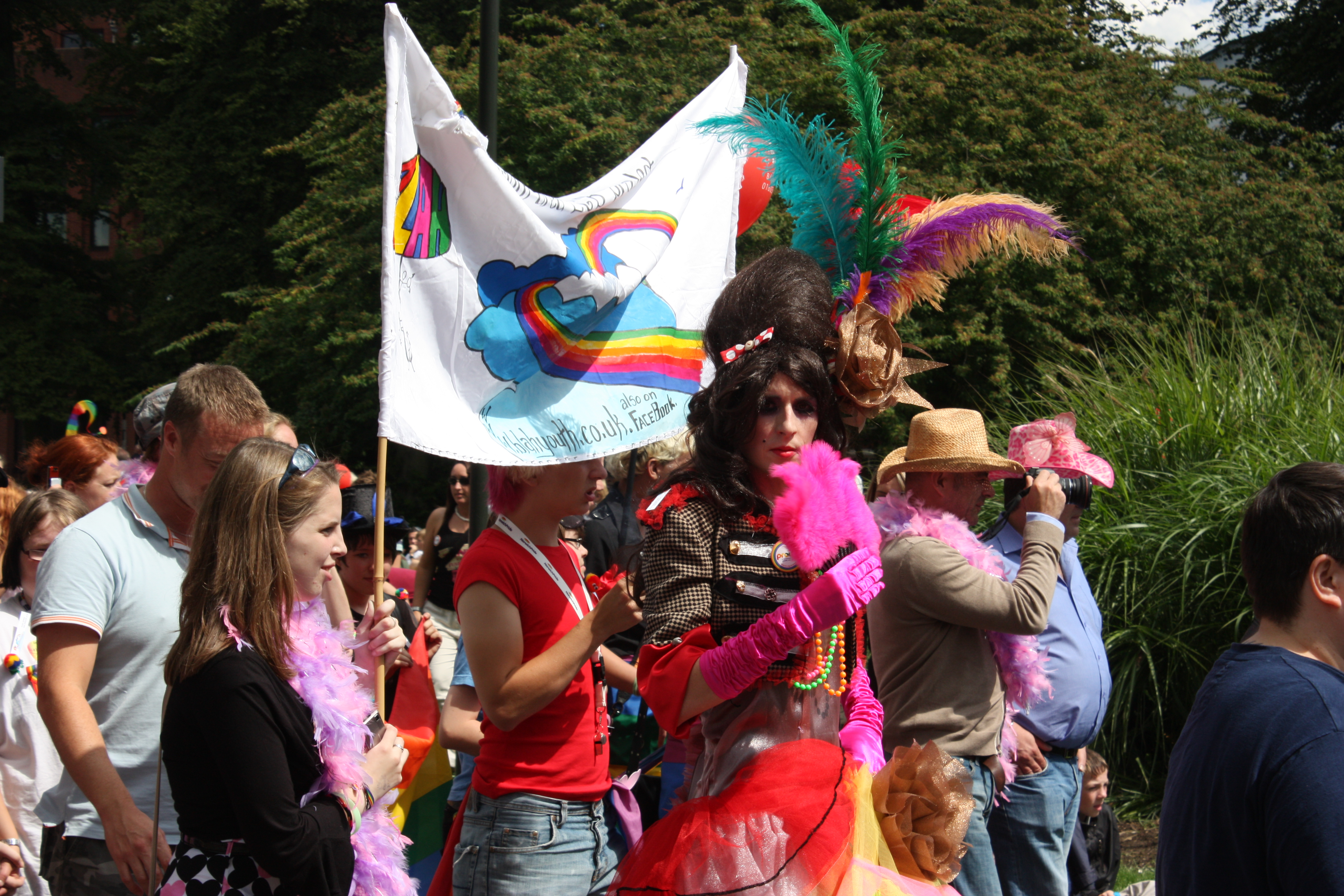
The first Norwich Pride in 2009

The first Norwich Pride in 2009 ran from Friday 24 to Sunday 26 July and was attended by approximately 3,000 people, more than Savage's expected "few hundred", and a prediction of about 1,000 from Norwich Gay Pride Collective chairman Nick O’Brian. O'Brian as well as Di Cunningham, then-future leaders of Proud Canaries, were involved in organising this first event. The slogan for the event was "let's turn Norwich into a rainbow," and most of its funding came from trade unions. Events included 'Camp It Up Cabaret' on the 24th and the first Norwich pride parade on the 26th from Chapelfield Gardens to the Forum, which was launched by the Lord Mayor of Norwich and preceded by an Oxjam concert organised by Oxfam. A multi-faith service was held at St Peter Mancroft Church that afternoon, and Norwich Castle raised a rainbow flag on the day. The event was attended by prominent LGBTQ human rights campaigner Peter Tatchell. Some Christians attended anti-LGBTQ protests during the procession and handed out leaflets which included words deemed "hateful" and "violently offensive" by Norwich Pride organisers. According to one attendee, these protesters held placards with bible quotes such as "the wages of sin is death."

=== 2010s: Rise in popularity and sponsorship ===
In 2010, an interfaith church service was held at the Octagon Chapel in the city entitled Coming Out as a Spiritual Practice on the day of the parade, in an attempt to avert the "religious prejudice" seen at the parade the previous year. Also as a response to the anti-LGBTQ protests, artist Helen Simpson wrote to every church in Norwich and asked them to knit small squares of different colours, making a 40-metre (130 ft) rainbow scarf from the 1,500 squares she received. The scarf was blessed at City Hall in 2010 and then hung on its balcony annually for Pride, though it was later thought to have been lost or binned. Other events aside from the parade to the Forum at the 2010 event included lectures and a Ladyfest concert headlined by Viv Albertine of punk band The Slits. Tatchell again attended the event in 2011, and participated in a "Question Time style debate" with MP Chloe Smith. It was again supported by the city's Lord Mayor. Norwich Pride held an annual LGBT History Month in March from 2011, and in 2012 the local Sing With Pride choir at this event honoured Labi Siffre, funded by a grant from Norfolk County Council's LGBT Icons scheme.

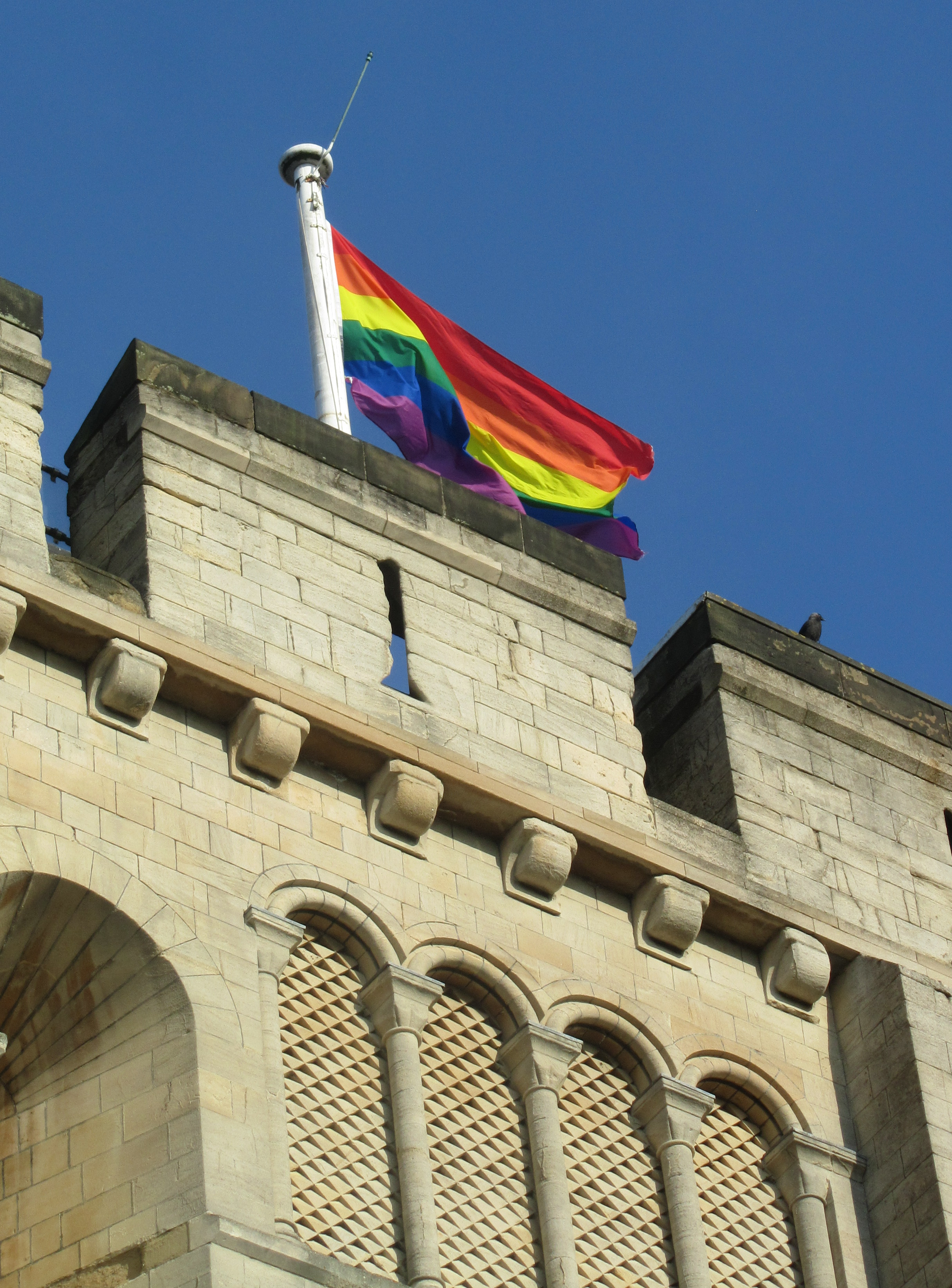
Norwich Castle flew the rainbow flag in 2014

Following his work for the access steward for the organisation, Dean Simons became chair of Norwich Pride in 2013. Norwich Pride booked out the Forum for a week for the 2013 event. For five days prior to the parade on 27 July, a Pride 5 Festival was held with a different theme for each day; these themes were love, health, identity, music, and youth. Organisers stated that it was "all about visibility". For the youth-themed day, a "child's guide to pride" leaflet was released for the first time. The rainbow scarf was this time unveiled on the balcony of the city hall, and the lion statues outside the entrance to the building were dressed in rainbow colours. The parade was headed by Norwich Samba Band and dancers, and included the 50-metre rainbow flag from Exeter Pride. other events on parade day included another Question Time events and a picnic. Attendance of the event was "way in excess of the expected 5,000," according to Savage, which was cited as "record numbers" for the event. A collaboration between Norwich Pride and Norwich City F.C., partly helped by a friendship between Bremner and Di Cunningham, led to the foundation of the Proud Canaries in November 2013.

Norwich Pride 2014's parade was opened by Lord Mayor of Norwich Judith Lubbock and headed by a transgender woman and her two grandchildren. It also included 42 umbrellas, each with a name of a Commonwealth country in which it was illegal to be LGBTQ painted in red, to coincide with the 2014 Commonwealth Games in Glasgow. Tatchell again attended and spoke from the bandstand of Chapelfield Gardens. Simons, chair of Norwich Pride, died in December 2014.

Organisations such as anti-domestic violence charity Broken Rainbow, school advocacy charity Educate and Celebrate and trade union Unison attended the 2015 event. In 2016, insurance company Aviva began sponsoring Norwich Pride. The event in 2017 featured an LGBTQ question time involving Phyll Opoku-Gyimah and Ruth Hunt, as well as art exhibitions, fitness sessions, and performances from Jack Rose and Helen McDermott. Josh Elms and Jo Rust attended the 2017 event, inspiring them to found King's Lynn Pride the next year.

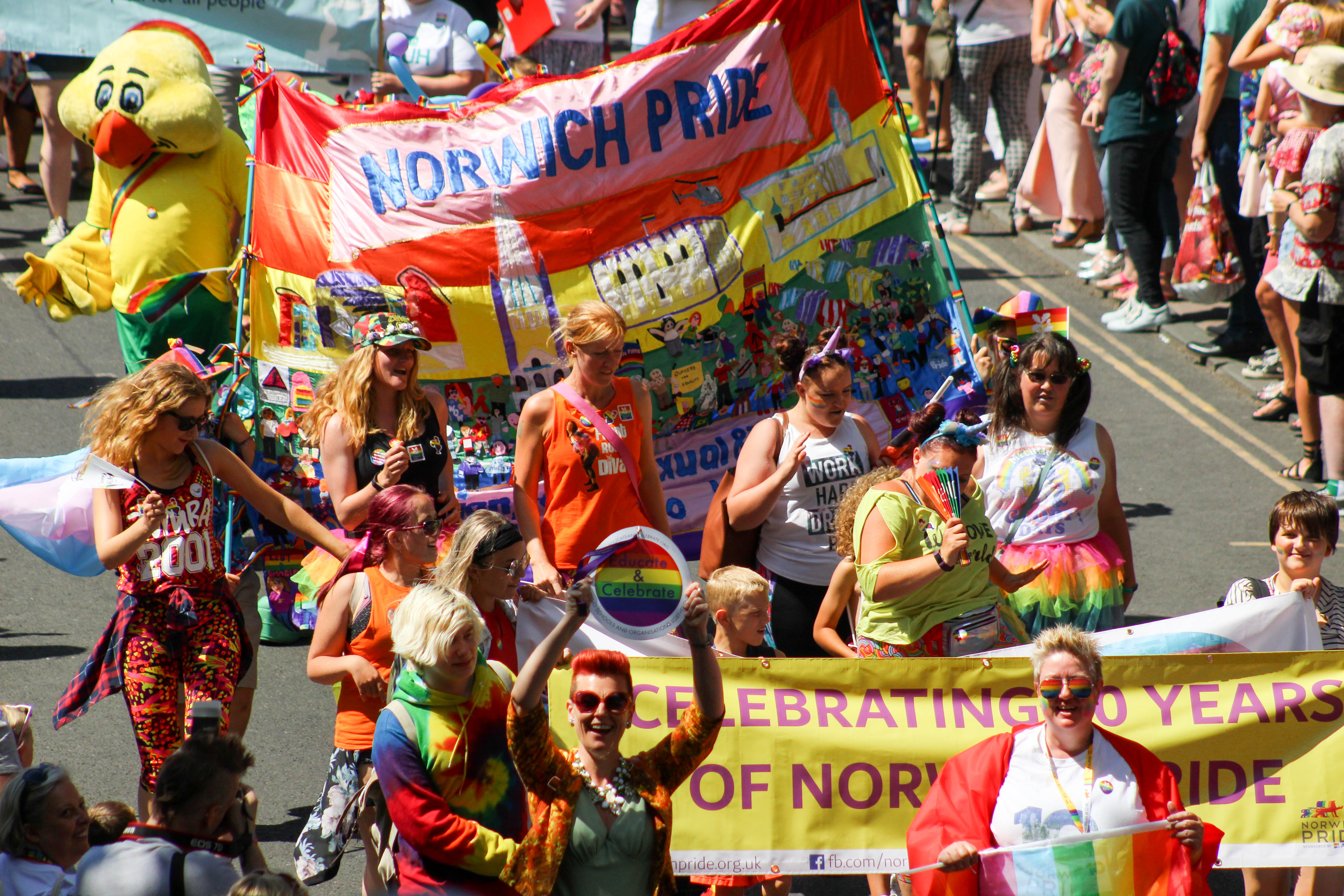
From top left: Norwich City F.C. canary mascot, Norwich Pride quilt. Bottom right: Julie Bremner.

The 2018 march was attended by approximately 10,000 people, and featured a "rainbow river," a fifty-metre long pride flag that was carried through the parade. Savage praised its "explosion of colour", including the presence of pansexual and non-binary flags. Other events included OUT140, a play at the Theatre Royal in which hundreds of coming out stories were told in the length of a tweet. A mural was created by local illustrator David Shenton for Norwich Pride, depicting 110 well-known LGBTQ individuals.

Event organisers estimated that 10,000 people also attended the event in 2019. Town crier Mike Wabe performed a cry to set off the march, beginning with "Ogay, Ogay, Ogay", and ending with "God save you queens". His speech received over 17,000 views online.

=== 2020s: COVID-19 pandemic and sponsorship changes ===
Norwich Pride became a registered charity in 2020. That year, the parade was cancelled due to the COVID-19 pandemic. Despite this, the march was recreated in digital form using video clips of people taking part. The event also adopted the progress pride flag designed by Daniel Quasar for the first time, which was projected onto the walls of Norwich Castle. Though in July 2021 a Norwich Pride Schools Week took place, Norwich Pride 2021 was also called off due to continued safety concerns about the pandemic. Instead, smaller events took place around the city, working with local venues and businesses.

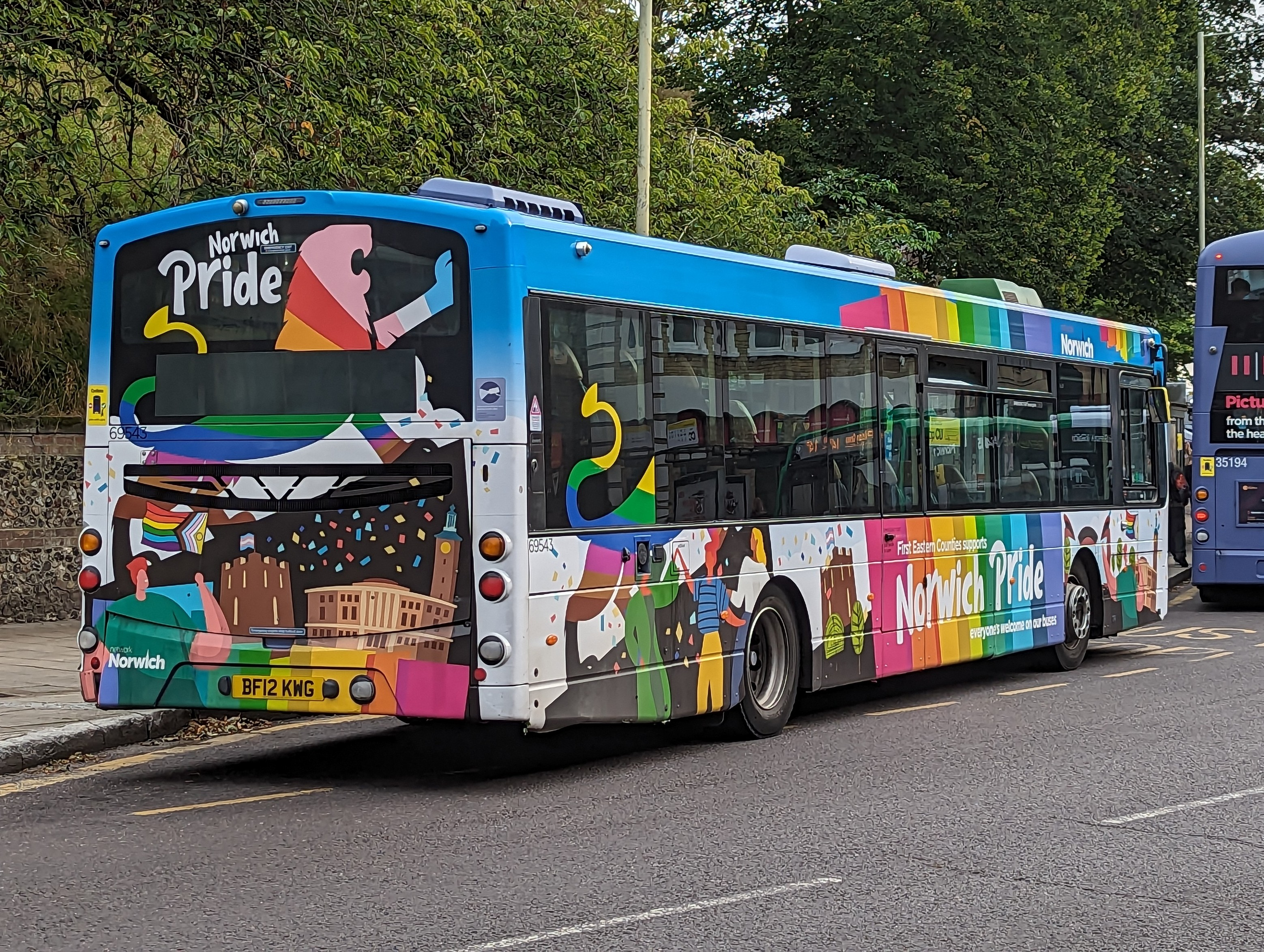
A bus wrapped in Pride colours was introduced in 2023

Norwich Pride returned for the first time after the pandemic in June 2022. That year, Aviva became the event's main sponsor. Norwich Pride Schools Week again took place in June and July 2022. For the 2023 event, a group of queer stitchers known as Sew Gay created a patchwork quilt in March, and a bus wrapped in the colours of the pride flag was unveiled in May. The event itself included five stages across the city centre, as well as an art exhibition and a makers' market.

Prior to the 2024 event, Aviva stated that it would no longer sponsor Norwich Pride after members of Norwich Trans Pride called for organisers to drop the company "in solidarity with our siblings facing a genocide in Palestine", due to its investments in Barclays, which itself had ties to defence companies supplying Israel as well as fossil fuel firms. Aviva cited the "safety of our people at the event" as the main reason it made the decision to pull out, but said that they "remain[ed] committed to the Pride agenda". The Norwich Labour Group was told not to display their party flag during the parade due to anger concerning the policies of Wes Streeting. The day after the parade, arsonists set fire to some pride flags on a stall on Norwich Market as well as a nearby jewellery shop.

In May 2025, train operating company Greater Anglia was announced as the main sponsor of Norwich Pride for that year. Greater Anglia is set to be nationalised under Great British Railways in October 2025. Prior to the 2025 event, the 40-metre scarf first created in 2010 was found in church storage "eaten by mice," and restored by its original artist Helen Simpson alongside members of the Octagon Unitarian Chapel and Norwich Quakers, who added a new panel representing the progress flag. On the day of the event, it was carried from the Octagon Chapel to St Peter Mancroft Church before being hung across the atrium of the Forum. Expected to draw 20,000 people, the event featured around 120 stalls in six different locations including at The Forum, Theatre Street and Chapelfield Gardens. Drag queen Crystal held a Q&A session and performed.

== Gallery ==
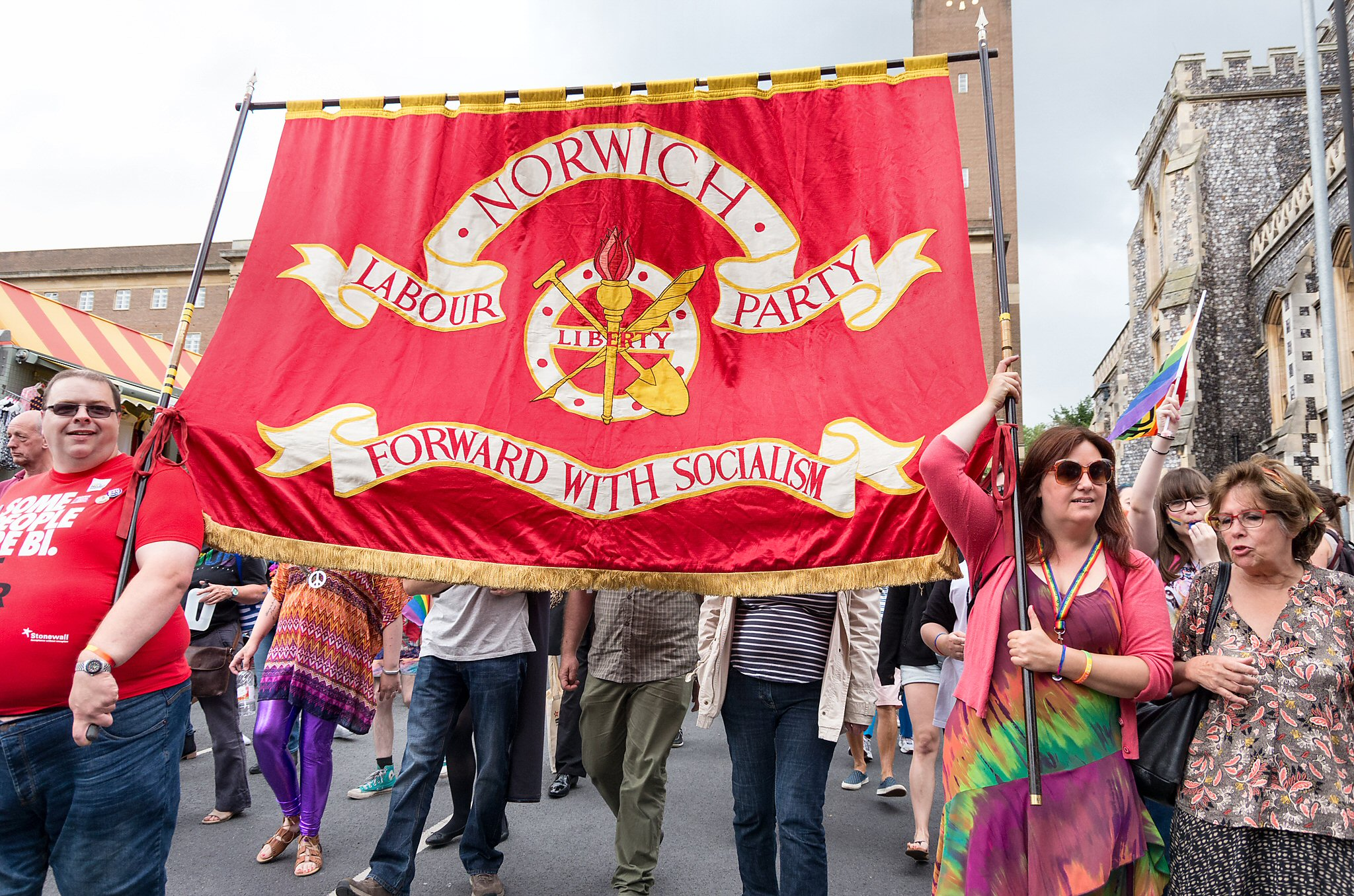
Norwich Labour Party banner (2016)

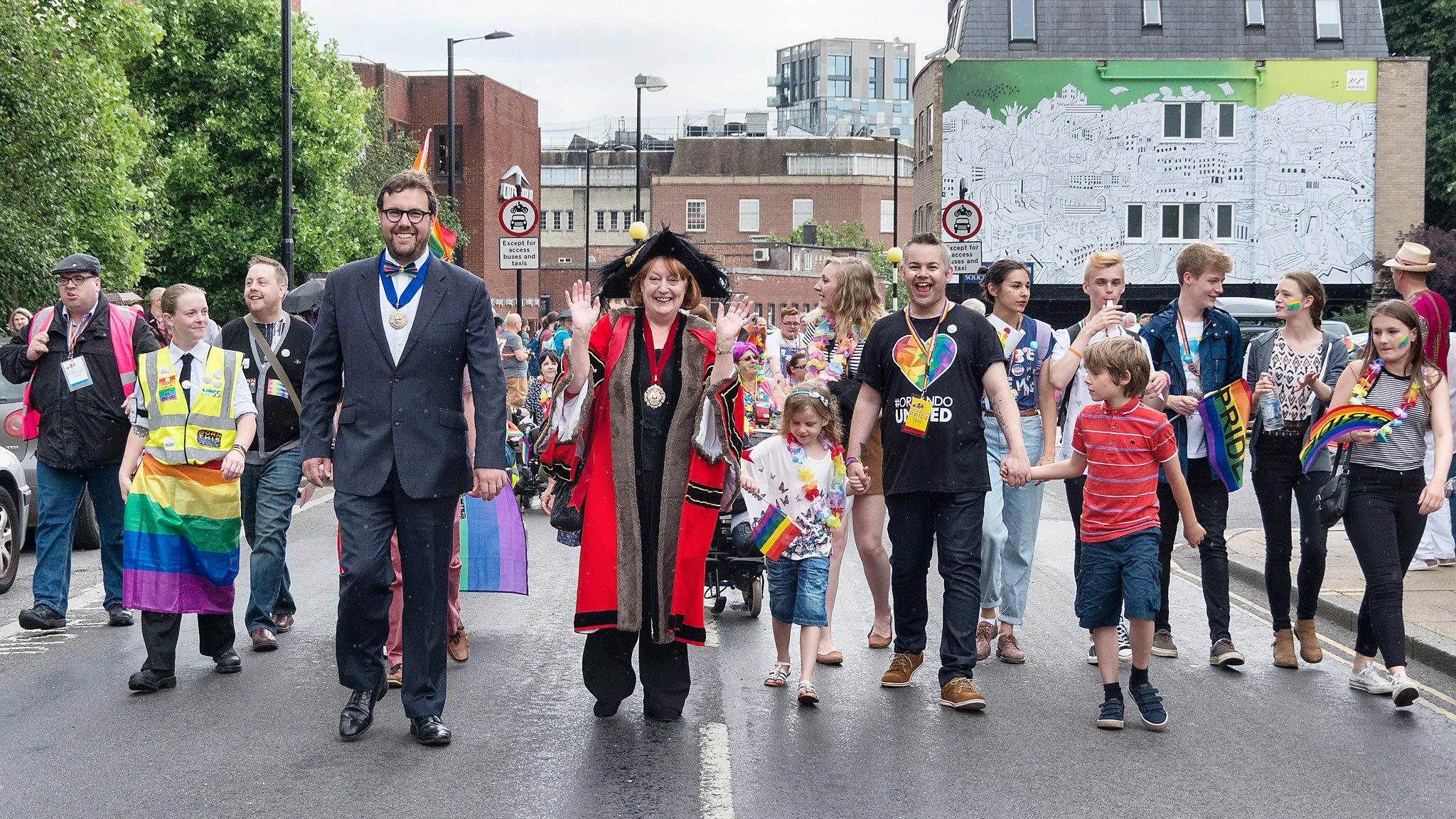
The Mayor of Norwich heading the parade (2016)

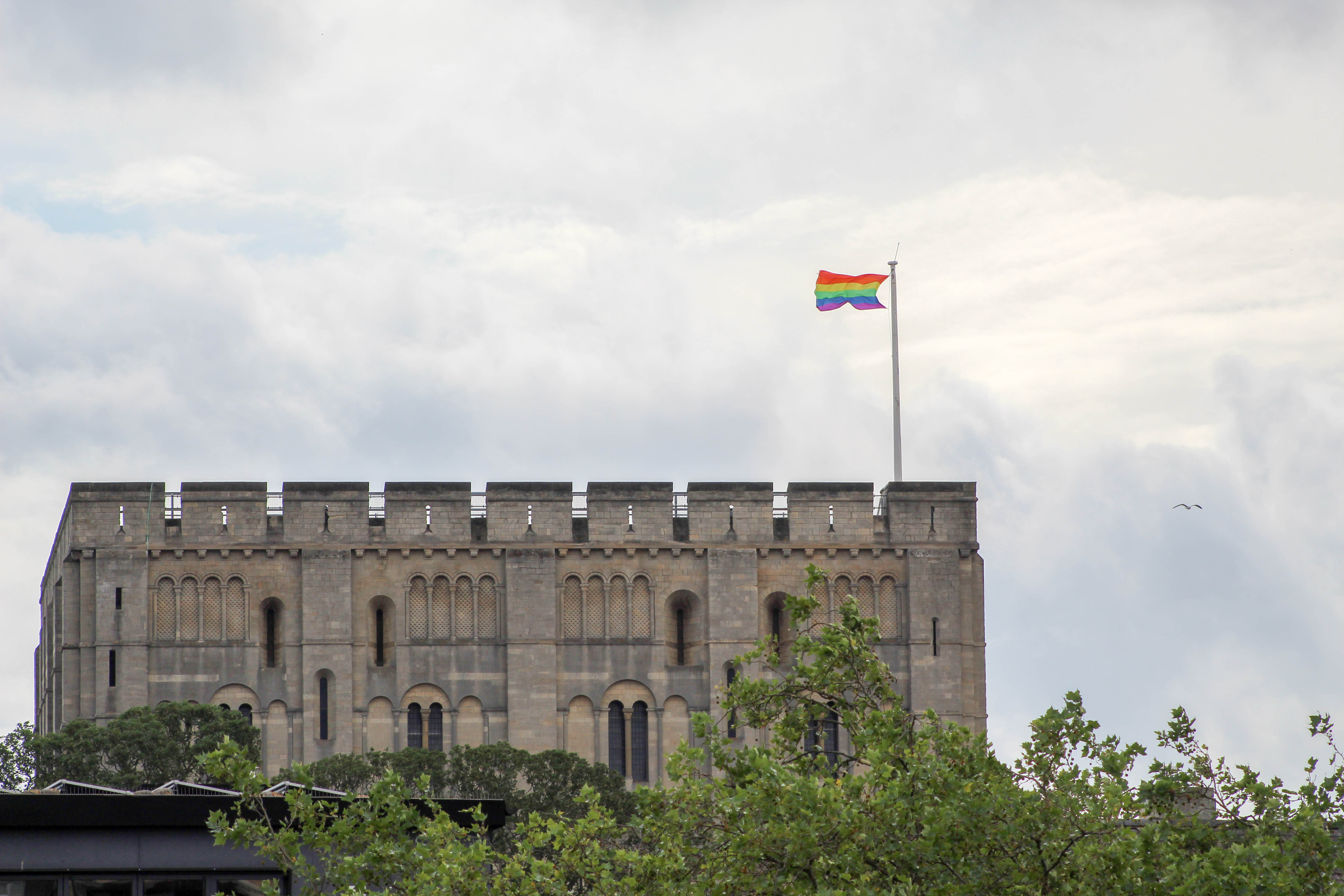
Pride flag at Norwich Castle (2018)

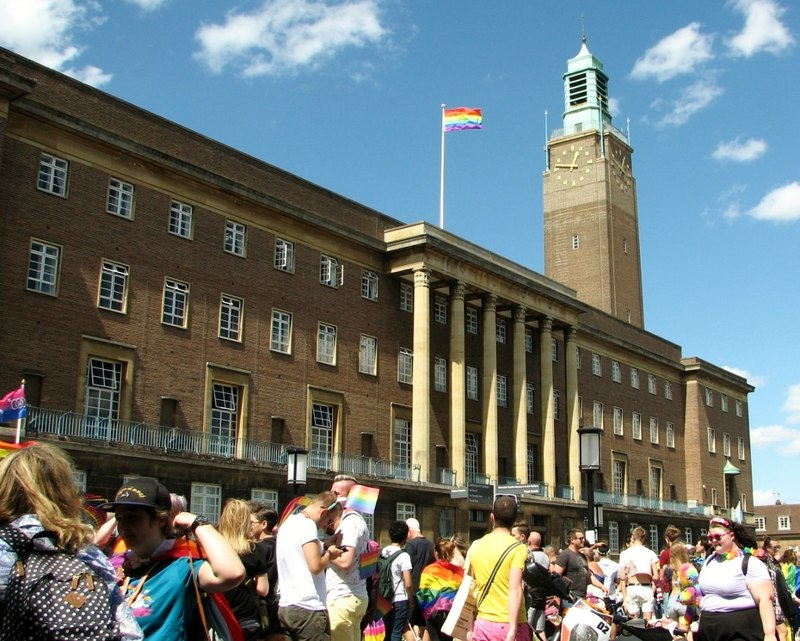
Pride flag at City Hall (2018)

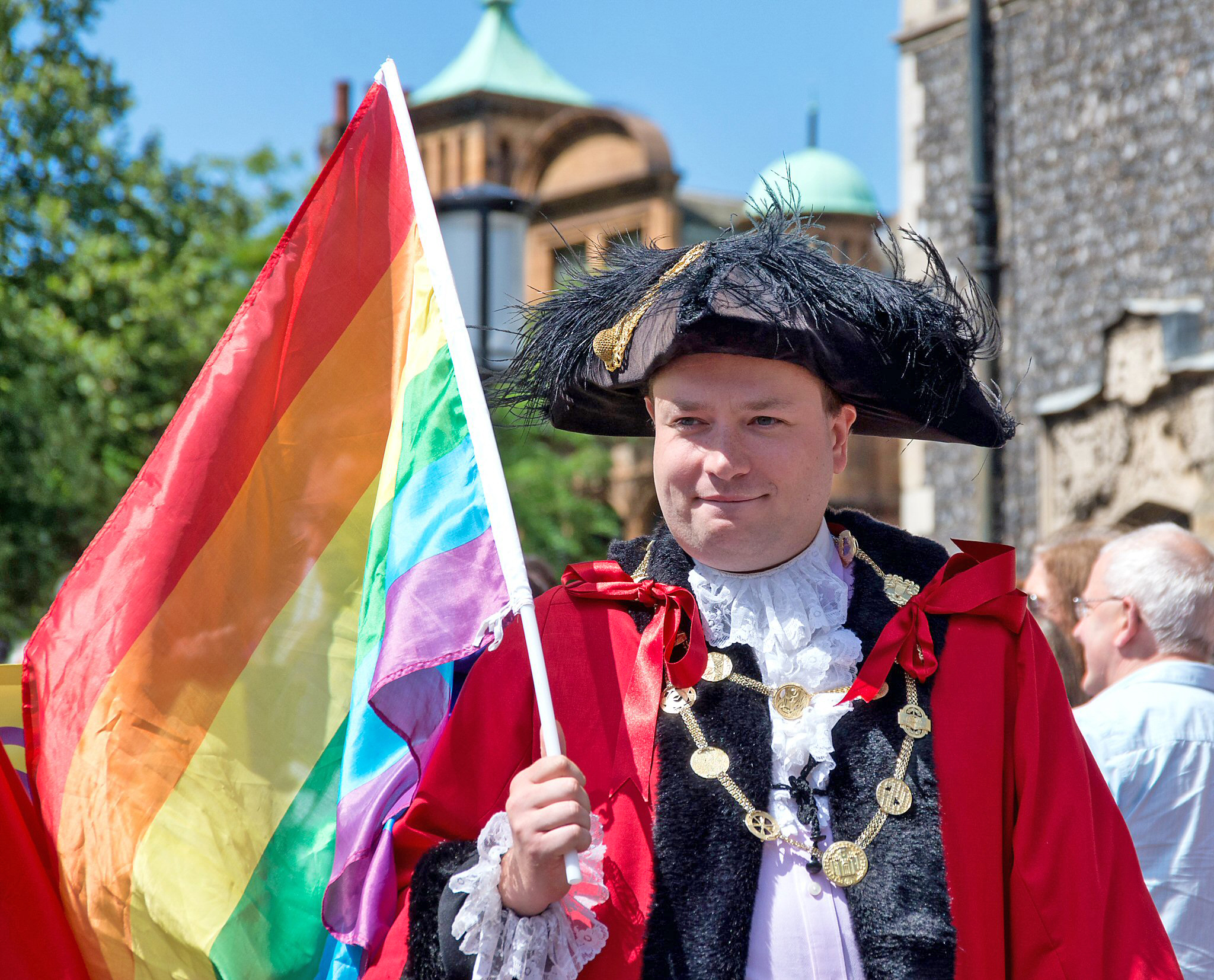
Mayor of Norwich (2018)

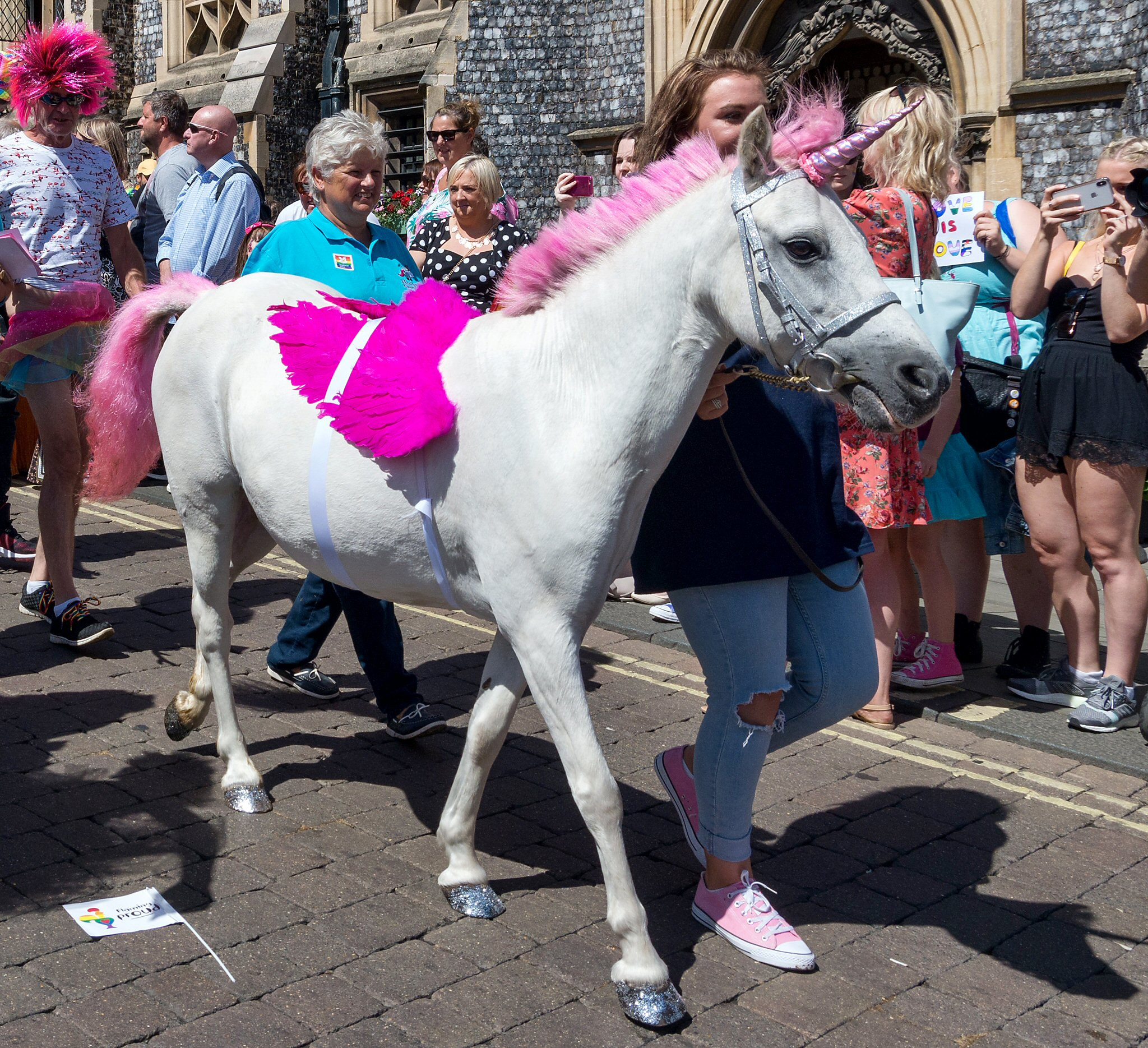
Pony dressed as a unicorn (2018)

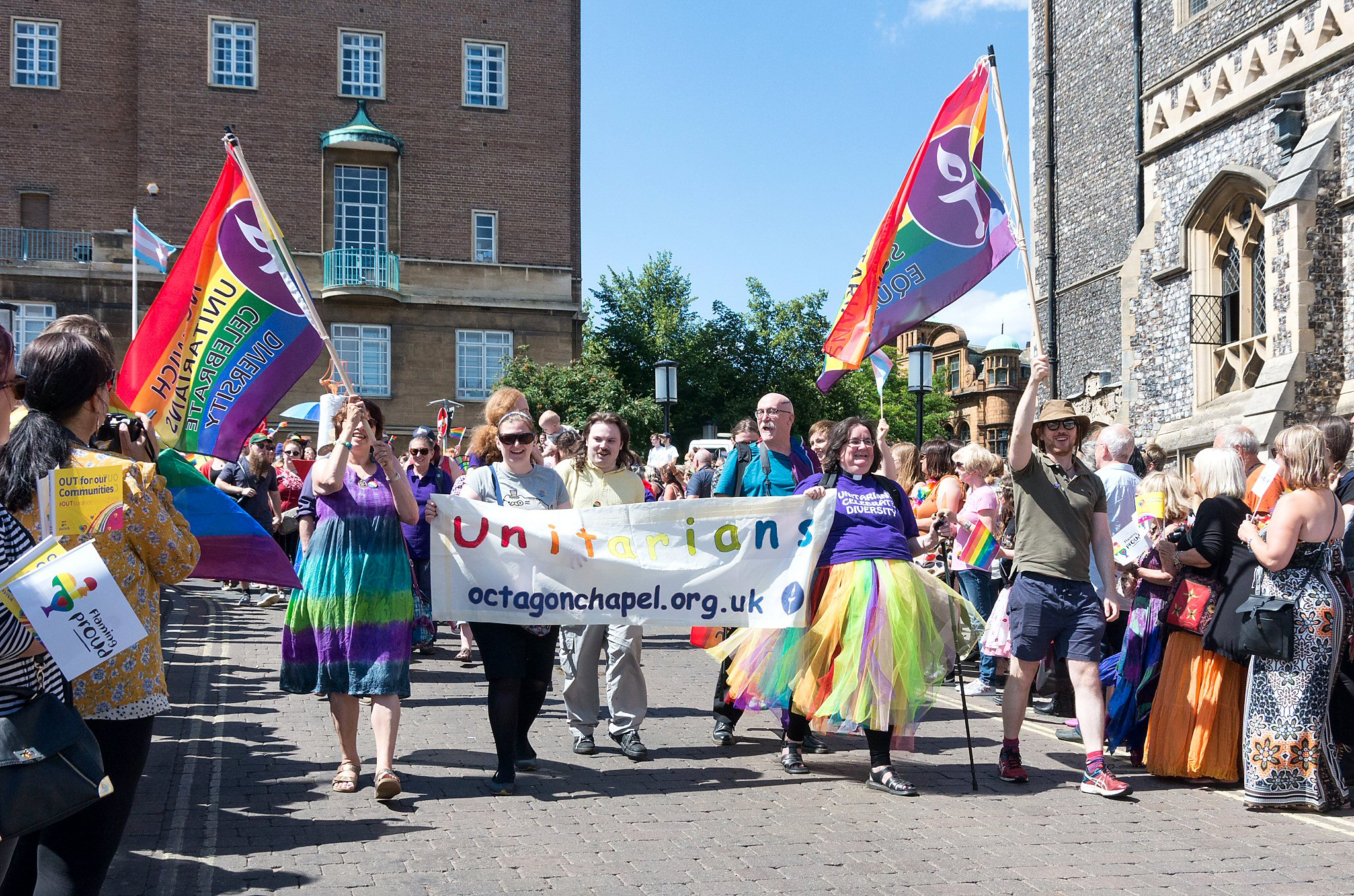
Octagon Unitarian Chapel at the march (2018)

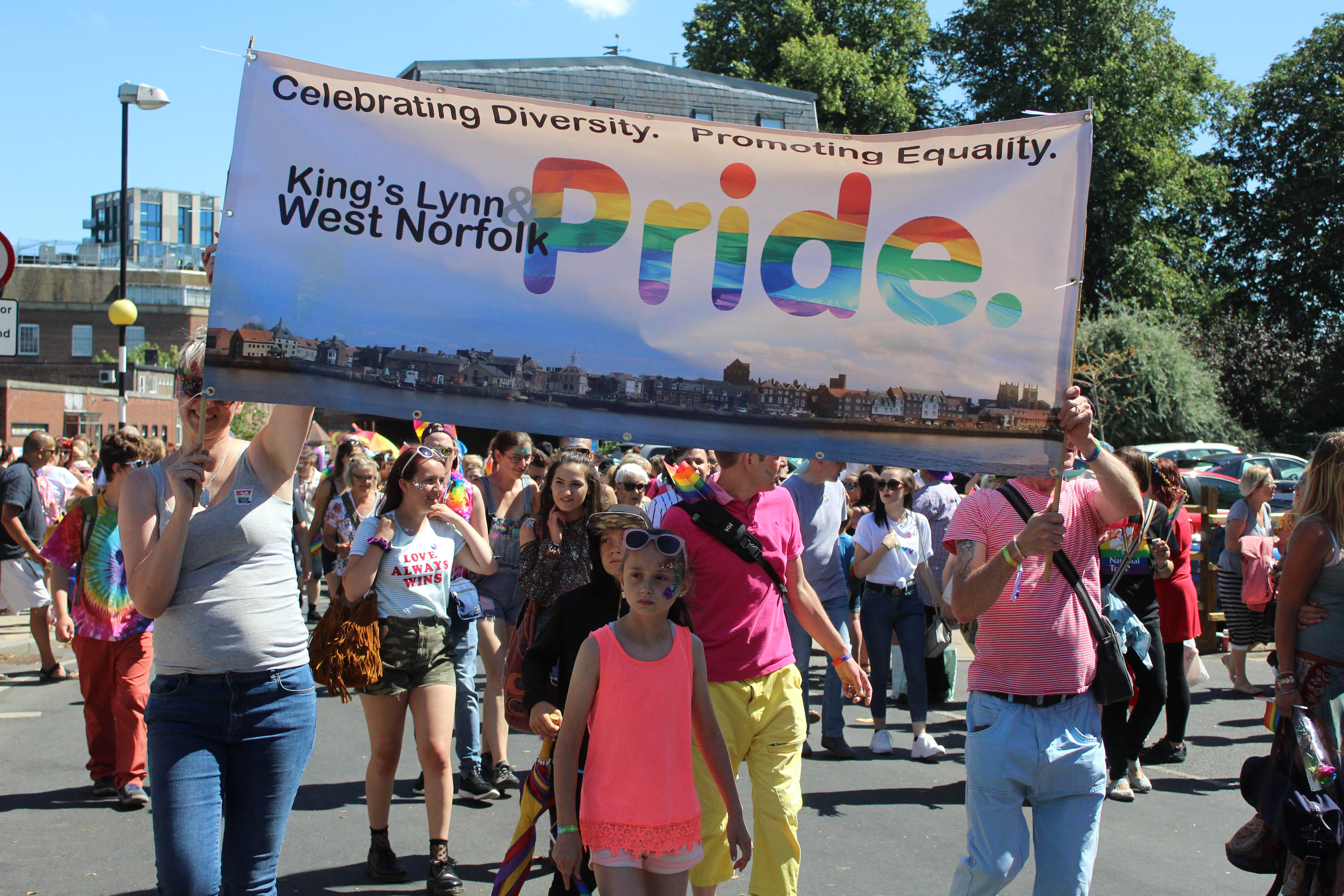
King's Lynn and West Norfolk Pride banner (2018)

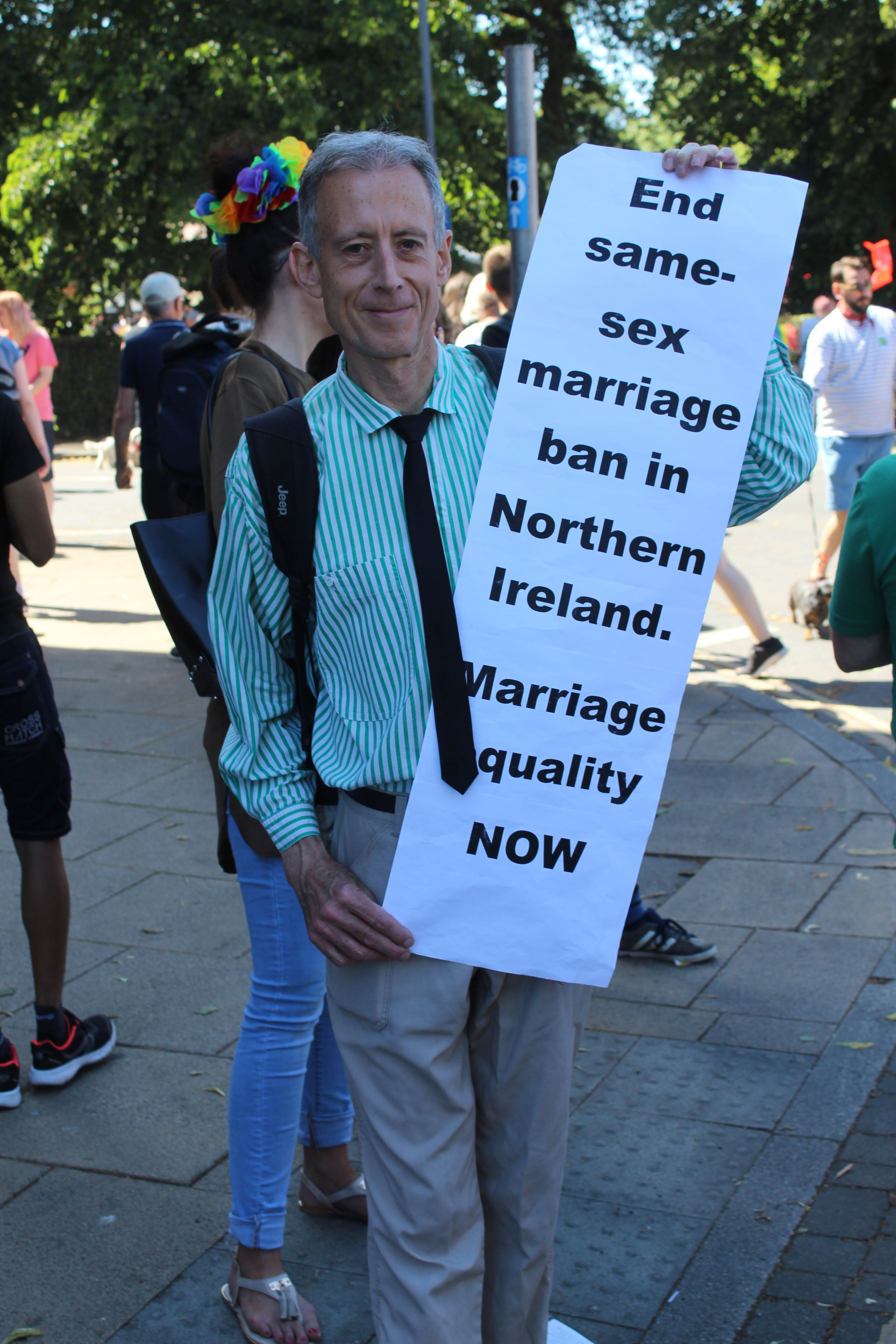
Peter Tatchell (2018)

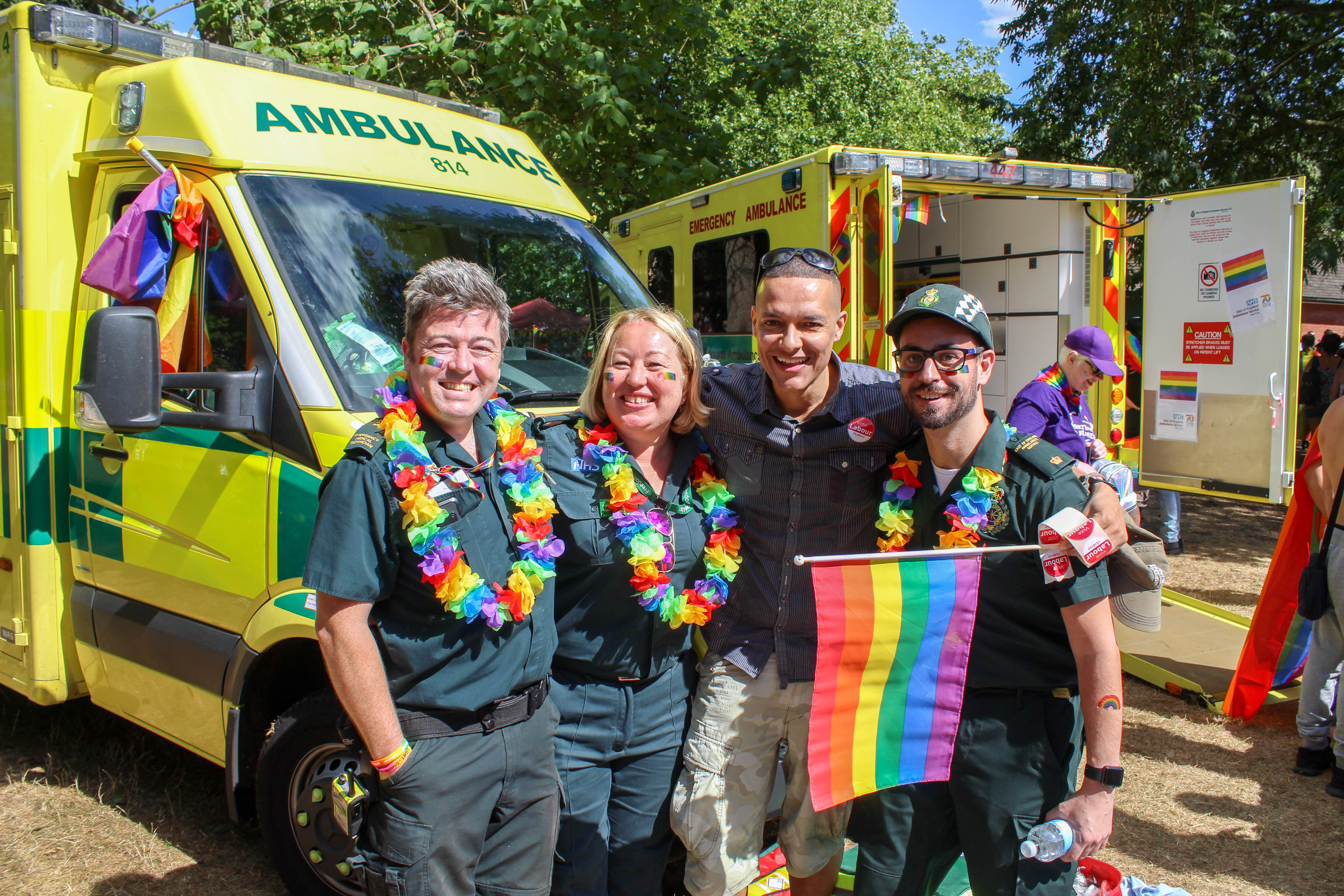
Local Ambulance Service and MP Clive Lewis (third from left) (2018)

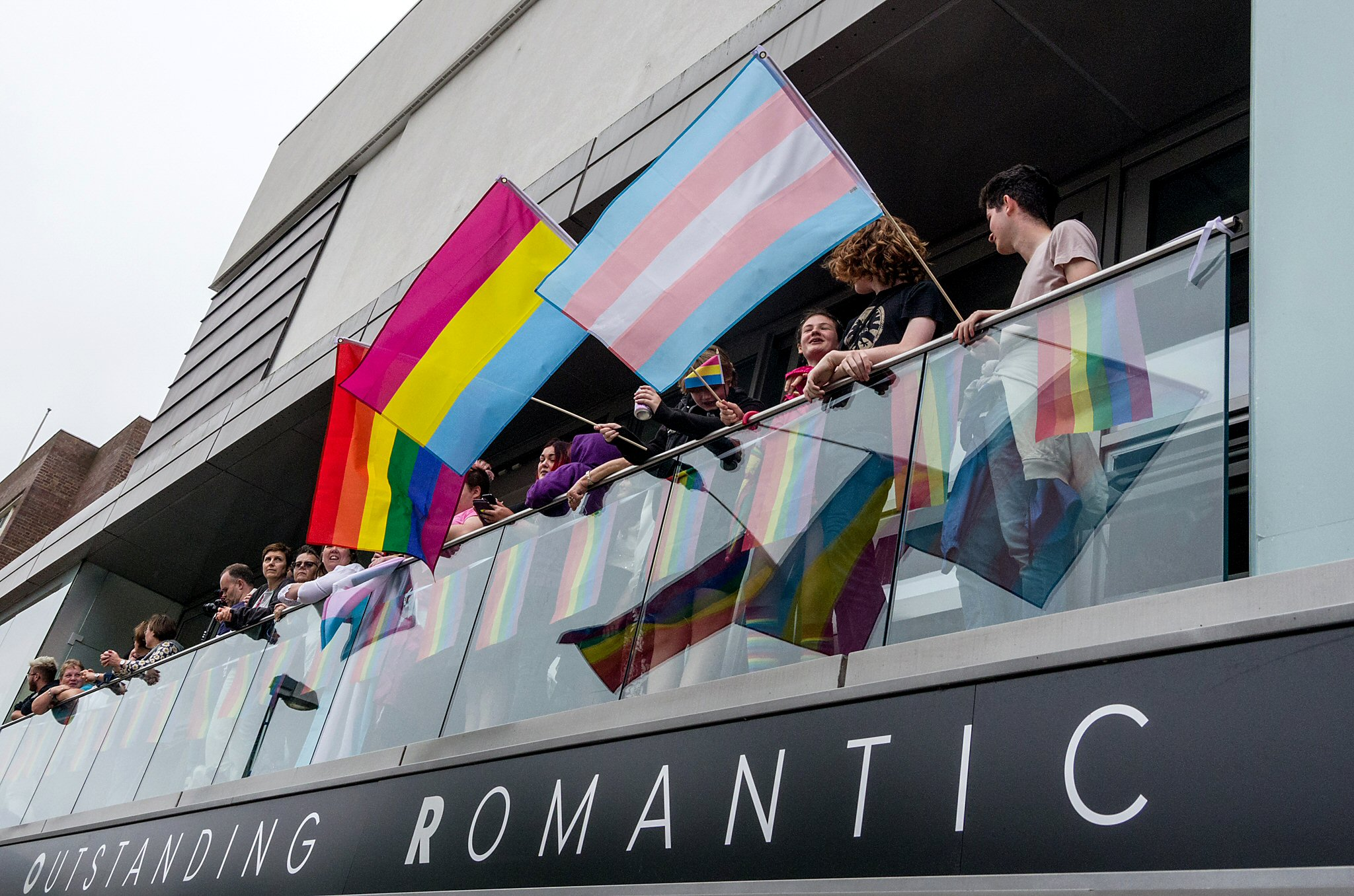
Theatre Royal balcony (2019)

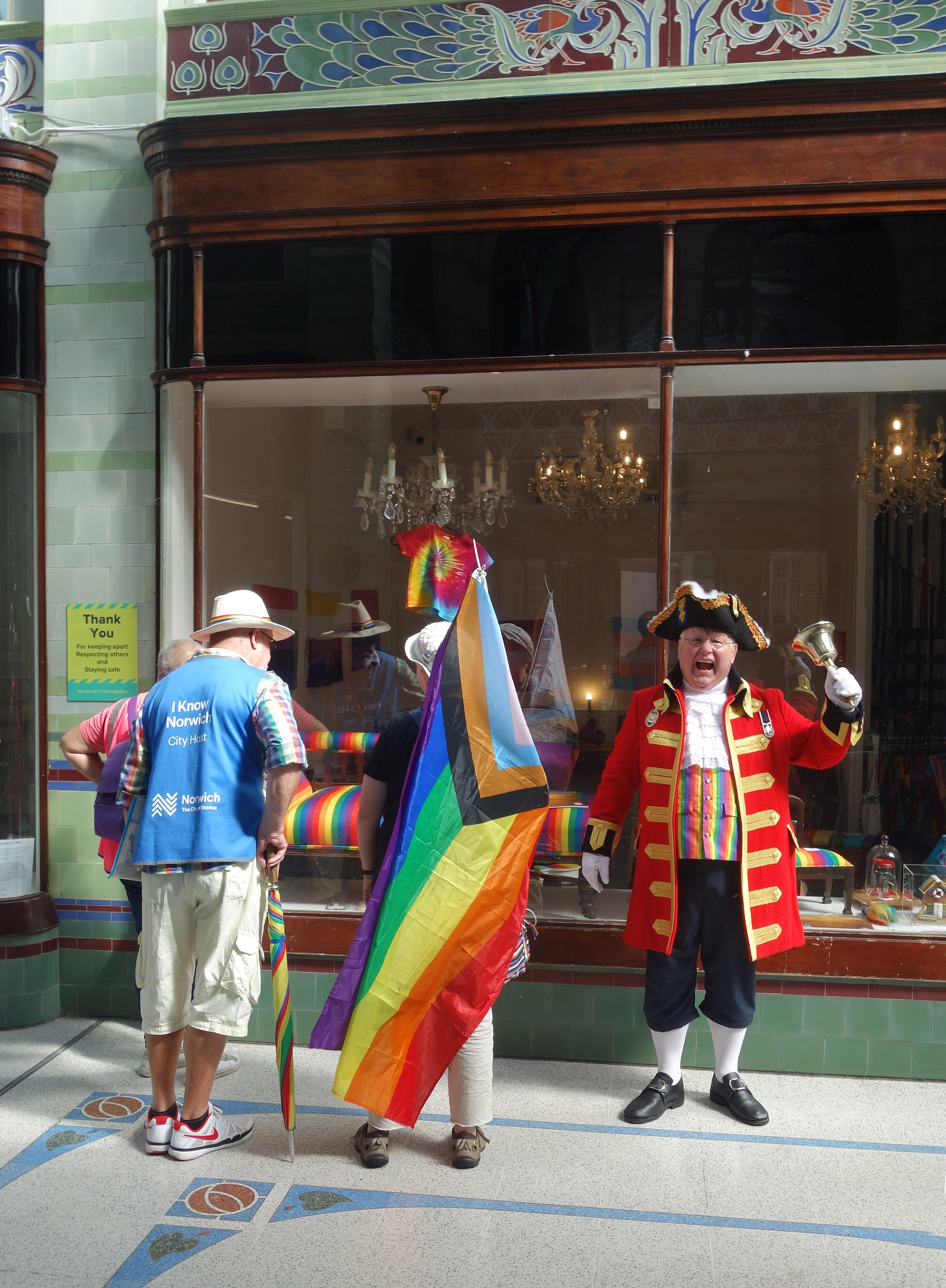
Town crier in the Royal Arcade (2021)
