= Numb (Natasha Hamilton song) =

2026 song by Natasha Hamilton

Single by Natasha Hamilton

from the EP Extraction
- Released: 16 January 2026
- Recorded: 2025
- Genre: Electropop
- Length: 2:56
- Label: Morpho Records
- Songwriters: Andy Gannon; Natasha Hamilton
- Producer: Andy Gannon

Natasha Hamilton singles chronology
| "Burning Letters" (2025) | "Numb" (2026) | "Fantasy" (2026) |

"Numb" is a song by English singer and former Atomic Kitten member Natasha Hamilton. It was released on 16 January 2026 through her own record label, Morpho Records, as the lead single from her debut extended play, Extraction (2026). An electropop song, it was written by Hamilton and Andy Gannon; Gannon also handled the production.

== Background and release ==
In October 2024, Hamilton announced her departure from the girl group Atomic Kitten, 26 years after their formation. She subsequently went on to release the single "Burning Letters" the following year. In January 2026, Hamilton began teasing new music, and three days prior to its release, officially announced "Numb" as her next single. It is an electropop song and was written and produced by Andy Gannon, along with Hamilton and is the first to be released via her label Morpho Records, established the previous year. Speaking of its release, Hamilton said the song was "written in that space where you realise survival isn’t the same as living. It's about noticing when you’ve shut down emotionally and deciding to feel again, even when it’s uncomfortable. This song marks a turning point for me creatively. It’s honest, grounded and exactly where I am now."

== Music video ==
Hamilton released a music video alongside the single, set primarily in a forest, which begins with her in funeral attire carrying a candle at night, before blowing it out ahead of the chorus. As the song reaches its second verse, she is seen during the day wearing a red outfit and walking through the forest. During the song's bridge, Hamilton walks into a lake and is seen putting her hand into the water. She is the seen in a body of water, rubbing off her make up, prior to the final chorus which sees Hamilton in a blonde wig and sunglasses performing choreography, and at one point appearing behind ribbed glass.

== Critical reception ==
Frank Bell of Fame Magazine described the song as a "measured electropop reset" that "prioritises clarity over nostalgia" and noted that the song "unfolds in the quiet aftermath of overload, tracing the shift from survival to awareness with calm, deliberate focus." He added that the song "signals a clear pivot" [in Hamilton's career] and that it "acknowledged her legacy [in Atomic Kitten] without retreating into it."

== Personnel ==
Credits adapted from Spotify.

- Natasha Hamilton – vocals, songwriting
- Andy Gannon – production, songwriting
- Jonas Wrestling – mixing engineer

== Release history ==
| Region | Date | Format | Label | Ref. |
|---|---|---|---|---|
| Various | 16 January 2026 | Digital download, streaming | Morpho Records | |
