= Pride Canterbury =

LGBTQ+ pride event and parade held in Kent, UK

- Status: Active
- Genre: Pride Event
- Frequency: Annually
- Location: Canterbury, Kent
- Country: United Kingdom
- Years active: 2016–present
- Inaugurated: 11 June 2016
- Most recent: 6 June 2026
- Next event: 12 June 2027
- Attendance: 30,000+ (2022)
- Major events: Parade; Festival
- Organiser: Pride Canterbury CIC
- Filing status: Community Interest Company (CIC)
- Other Work: Canterbury's Pride Exhibition
- Website: pridecanterbury.com

Pride Canterbury is the LGBTQ+ pride event and parade held each June in Canterbury, Kent in the United Kingdom, since 2016, and next returning on Saturday 12 June 2027.

== Canterbury's Pride Exhibition ==
The Canterbury's Pride Exhibition, held at the Beaney House of Art and Knowledge, ran from Saturday 8 August 2020 to Wednesday 9 September 2020. Due to the COVID-19 pandemic its fifth annual event planned for 13 June 2020 was rescheduled to 11 September 2021, so this exhibition showcased the history of Pride Canterbury through exhibits, photographs and film, in addition to information about the Stonewall riots, the origin of Pride parades, and the history of drag.

== History ==
=== 2016–2021 ===
First launched on 11 June 2016, Pride Canterbury saw over 2,000 people attend. This increased when the second event took place in June 2017. On 9 June 2018 over 16,000 people attend.

From 2016 to 2019, the parade started at The Marlowe Theatre, led by the Lord Mayor of Canterbury and proceeded through the high street up to the Dane John Gardens for the Pride festival.

Events have included speeches from Rosie Duffield in 2017; acts included S Club, and The Vixen both in 2018, RuPaul’s Drag Race queens Courtney Act and Willam In 2017.

In 2019 over 20,000 people attended on 15 June 2019. Acts included among others Gok Wan and Nadine Coyle.

Pride Canterbury on 11 September 2021 featured artists such as Baga Chipz, 5ive, Cheryl Hole, The Saturgays, etc.

=== 2022 ===
Pride Canterbury 2022 was on 11 June 2022, featuring Denise Van Outen, Alexandra Burke, and stars from RuPaul's Drag Race.

=== 2023 ===
On 10 Saturday and Sunday 11 June 2023 for the first two-day event, Pride Canterbury returned to Canterbury, seeing artists such as Liberty X, Caity Baser, Danny Beard, Baga Chipz, Layton Williams, Miriam-Teak Lee, Le Fil, and more. The event saw Rob Wills broadcast the first live programme from Pride Canterbury to KMFM (radio network) as part of KMFM's Floorfiller Anthems.

Earlier in the year, a vinyl supporting Pride Canterbury displayed in the City of Canterbury was destroyed.

=== 2024 ===
Pride Canterbury announced their 2024 event for Saturday 8 June 2024, with artists including Katie Price, Bailey J Mills, Urban Cookie Collective, Michelle Mcmanus, Charity Shop Sue, Oompa Loompa actress Kirsty Patterson, Baga Chipz, Kerry Ellis, Booty Luv, KMFM's Rob Wills with a live broadcast, and more.

=== 2025 ===
Pride Canterbury was held in a new venue with a new parade route on Saturday 7 June 2025 due to the Levelling Up Works closing the Dane John Gardens until December 2025. There was no main stage with live acts in 2025.

=== 2026 ===
The event returned to the Dane John Gardens on Saturday 6th June 2026.

== Lineups ==
Chronology of Pride Canterbury Events & Other Work
No.	Year	Date	Attendees	Artists
1	2016	11 June	2,000+	Danny Beard — Delilah Tickles (Host) — Little GaGa (Lady Gaga Tribute) — Vicky Jackson (as P!NK) (launch event)
2	2017	10 June	TBC	Courtney Act & William — Delilah Tickles (Host) — Donna Marie (Lady Gaga Tribute) — Glitterbomb Drag Queens — Mary Mac — Vicky Jackson (as P!NK)
3	2018	9 June	16,000+	Abalicious (ABBA Tribute) — Delilah Tickles (Host) — Kylie Minogue (Tribute) — Mini Mixx (Little Mix Tribute) — Miss Jason Dear — S Club (Jo, Tina, Bradley) — Spice Girls 2 — Sum Ting Wong
4	2019	15 June	20,000+	Amanda Bang — Baga Chipz — Big Brovaz & Booty Luv — Cynthia Lee Fontaine — Delilah Tickles (Host) — DJ Jack Aird — Felix Le Freak — Gok Wan (Lip Sync Showdown) — Jack & Joel — Lana Evoli — Luna Le Strange as P!NK — The Glitterbombshells — Tom Barber (DJ Set)
–	2020	8 August – 9 September	N/A	N/A (Canterbury's Pride Exhibition)
5	2021	11 September	23,000+	5ive — Baga Chipz — Cheryl Hole — Danny Beard — River Medway — Tayris Mongardi — The Saturgays
6	2022	11 June	30,000+	Anubis — Baga Chipz — Dame Jame — Danny Beard — Delilah Tickles (Host) — Denise Van Outen — Donna Marie as Lady Gaga — Jimbo — Jujubee — Lycra 80s Aerobics — River Medway — Ryan James Abbot's Haus of Heels — The Diety — Tom Barber (DJ Set) — Vicky Jackson (as P!NK)
7	2023	10–11 June	TBC	Liberty X — Caity Baser — Danny Beard — Baga Chipz — Layton Williams — Miriam-Teak Lee — Le Fil
8	2024	8 June	TBC	Bailey J Mills — Big Brovaz — Black Peppa — Booty Luv — Baga Chipz — Cheryl Hole — Katie Price — Kerry Ellis — Michelle McManus — Sabrina Washington — The Bitten Peach — Charity Shop Sue — Charlie Lee — Delilah Tickles — The Oompa Loompa (from The Willy Wonka Experience) — Rob Wills with KMFM's Floorfiller Anthems Live — Urban Cookie Collective — Antia Wee — Ben Aldridge (from Virgin Radio Pride) — The Cher Show — Dame Fanny — Dame Jame — Hause of Heels — Kiri Sax — Tom Barber (from Gaydio) — Amanda Jones as Dua Lipa — Angeldee — Alotta Teal — Anya Hole — Betty Late'n Never — Crunch Noodle — Dee Lexia — Dee Star — Dame Jame — Esmae — Haus of Heels — Havoc — Harry Styled — Joyless — Luna Lestrange — Prossie Tot — Prince Peach — Queer as an Aro — and more.
9	2025	7 June	TBC	N/A (2025 Event)
10	2026	6 June	TBC	Anita Wee — Atomic Kitten / Natasha Hamilton — Beth McCarthy — Beyonce Fierce — Booty Luv — Caroline Kingsbury — Courtney Act — Dame Jame — Delilah Tickles — DJ Ben Aldridge — DJ Tom Barber — Drag With No Name — Floorfiller Anthems with Rob and Numi from KMFM Breakfast — House Gospel Choir (DJ Set) — Just May — Pixie Polite — Vinegar Strokes
11	2027	12 June	TBC	TBC
