= The Collection (Atomic Kitten album) =

2005 compilation album by Atomic Kitten

Compilation album by Atomic Kitten
- Released: 2 May 2005
- Recorded: 1999–2003
- Genre: Pop
- Length: 52:13
- Label: EMI

Atomic Kitten chronology
The Greatest Hits (2004)	The Collection (2005)	The Essential Collection (2012)

The Collection is the second compilation album by English girl group Atomic Kitten. It was released by EMI Records on 2 May 2005 to coincide with the group's temporary reunion on their single "Cradle." The album consists of singles, B-sides and tracks from their first three albums Right Now (2000), Feels So Good (2002), and Ladies Night (2003). While it failed to chart, The Collection was certified Silver by the British Phonographic Industry (BPI) in July 2013. Although she does not appear on the album cover and is not credited, Kerry Katona's vocals do appear on the album.

== Track listing ==
The Collection track listing
No.	Title	Writer(s)	Producer(s)	Length
1.	"Whole Again"	Andy McCluskey; Stuart Kershaw; Jem Godfrey; Bill Padley	Engine	3:03
2.	"Dancing in the Street"	Marvin Gaye; William "Mickey" Stevenson; Ivy Jo Hunter	Engine	3:38
3.	"Ladies Night" (featuring Kool & the Gang)	Ronald Bell; Kool & the Gang	Khalis Bayyan; Leigh Guest; Andy Whitmore^{[a]}; Ash Howes^{[b]}; Martin Harrington^{[b]}	3:08
4.	"Use Your Imagination"	Liz McClarnon; Liz Winstanley; Dave Garnish	Garnish	3:13
5.	"Turn Me On"	Kershaw; McCluskey	Engine	3:40
6.	"Right Now"	Kershaw; McCluskey	Howes; Harington	3:48
7.	"It's OK!"	Mikkel Storleer Eriksen; Hallgeir Rustan; Tor Erik Hermansen	Stargate	3:15
8.	"Love Won't Wait"	Rob Davis; Alex von Soos	Davis; Howes^{[b]}; Harrington^{[b]}	3:29
9.	"Don't Go Breaking My Heart"	Jenny Frost; Dominic Thrupp; Mark Ralph; Paul Olawoyin; Paul Wright; Theeyazan Ahmed	Howes; Harrington	3:43
10.	"Believer"	Billy Steinberg; Rick Nowels; Jennie Lofgren	Howes; Harrington; Nowels	3:46
11.	"Follow Me"	Lucy Abbot; Sara Eker; Dawn Joseph; Steve Robson; Peter Kearney	Trevor Steel; John Holliday; Quiet Money^{[b]}	3:15
12.	"Tomorrow and Tonight"	Kershaw; McCluskey; Ray Ruffin	Ruffin; Engine^{[b]}	3:26
13.	"Walking on the Water"	McCluskey; Kershaw	McCluskey; Kershaw; Lukas Burton^{[b]}	4:00
14.	"Love Doesn't Have to Hurt"	Steinberg; Kelly; Hoffs	Padley; Godfrey; Grant^{[b]}	3:28
15.	"No One Loves You (Like I Love You)"	McCluskey; Kershaw	McCluskey; Kershaw; Sebastian Morawietz^{[a]}	4:00

Notes

- ^{^[a]} denotes co-producer
- ^{^[b]} denotes additional producer

== Certifications ==
Certifications for The Collection
Region	Certification	Certified units/sales
United Kingdom (BPI)	Silver	60,000^{^}
^{^} Shipments figures based on certification alone.

== Release history ==
The Collection release history
Region	Date	Format(s)	Label	Ref.
United Kingdom	5 May 2005	CD; digital download	EMI Gold	
