= Atomic Kitten (album) =

2003 compilation album by Atomic Kitten

Compilation album by Atomic Kitten
- Released: 22 April 2003
- Studios: The Motor Museum Studio, Metropolis Studios, Wise Buddha Music Studios, etc.
- Genre: Pop
- Length: 41:50
- Label: Virgin
- Producers: Absolute; Trevor Steele; Hugh Goldsmith

Atomic Kitten chronology
Feels So Good (2002)	Atomic Kitten (2003)	Ladies Night (2003)

Atomic Kitten is a compilation album by English girl group Atomic Kitten. It was released by Virgin Records on 22 April 2003 in the United States, where their first two albums Right Now and Feels So Good had not been released yet, serving as their debut. In support of its release, the group partnered with Disney to feature their cover of "The Tide Is High" in the soundtrack of The Lizzie McGuire Movie, starring Hilary Duff.

== Critical reception ==
Professional ratings
Review scores
Source	Rating
New York Post	3.5/4 stars

Dan Aquilante of the New York Post prasied Atomic Kitten's self-titled album for its catchy, radio-friendly sound, highlighting "It's OK," their fresh take on "The Tide Is High," and the Motown-influenced ballad "Love Doesn't Have to Hurt."

== Commercial performance ==
Despite promotional efforts, the album failed to chart on the US Billboard 200. In New Zealand, where the group's previous albums Right Now and Feels So Good had achieved success, the album peaked at number seven.

== Track listing ==
Atomic Kitten track listing
No.	Title	Writer(s)	Producer(s)	Length
1.	"It's OK!"	Mikkel Storleer Eriksen; Hallgeir Rustan; Tor Erik Hermansen	Stargate	3:15
2.	"Be with You"	Greg Wilson; Tracey Carmen; Martin Foster; Jeff Lynne	Ash Howes; Martin Harrington	3:38
3.	"The Tide Is High (Get the Feeling)" (radio mix)	John Holt; Howard Barrett; Tyrone Evans; Bill Padley; Jem Godfrey	Padley; Godfrey; Carrie Grant^{[b]}	3:25
4.	"Feels So Good"	Kylie Minogue; Steve Anderson	Anderson	3:30
5.	"Walking on the Water"	Andy McCluskey; Stuart Kershaw	McCluskey; Kershaw; Lukas Burton^{[a]}	4:00
6.	"Love Doesn't Have to Hurt" (radio version)	Billy Steinberg; Tom Kelly; Susanna Hoffs	Padley; Godfrey; Grant^{[b]}	3:28
7.	"Love Won't Wait"	Rob Davis; Alex von Soos	Davis; Ash Howes^{[a]}; Martin Harrington^{[a]}	3:33
8.	"Whole Again"	Andy McCluskey; Stuart Kershaw; Jem Godfrey; Bill Padley	Engine	3:03
9.	"The Last Goodbye" (radio version)	Espen Lind; Amund Bjorklund; Eriksen; Rustan; Hermansen; Daniel Poku	Stargate	3:07
10.	"Right Now"	Kershaw; McCluskey	Absolute	3:35
11.	"Eternal Flame"	Billy Steinberg; Tom Kelly; Susanna Hoffs	Ray Ruffin	3:15
12.	"The Moment You Leave Me"	McCluskey; Kershaw; Liz McClarnon	McCluskey; Kershaw	3:28

Notes

- ^{^[a]} denotes additional producer
- ^{^[b]} denotes vocal producer

== Charts ==
=== Weekly charts ===
Weekly chart performance for Atomic Kitten
Chart (2003)	Peak position
New Zealand Albums (RMNZ)	7

=== Year-end charts ===
Year-end chart performance for Atomic Kitten
Chart (2003)	Position
New Zealand Albums (RMNZ)	38
