= Ladies Night (Atomic Kitten album) =

2003 studio album by Atomic Kitten

Studio album by Atomic Kitten
- Released: 10 November 2003
- Recorded: September 2002 – April 2003
- Studios: Metropolis Studios; The Motor Museum Studio; Wise Buddha Music Studios
- Genre: Pop
- Length: 52:37
- Labels: Innocent; Virgin
- Producers: Hugh Goldsmith (exec.); Khalis Bayyan; Ciaron Bell; Rob Davis; Julian Gallagher; Leigh Guest; Martin Harrington; Ash Howes; Rick Nowels; Steve Robson; Richard "Biff" Stannard; The True North Music Company; Andy Whitmore

Atomic Kitten chronology
Atomic Kitten (2003)	Ladies Night (2003)	The Greatest Hits (2004)

Singles from Ladies Night
- 1. "If You Come to Me" Released: 27 October 2003; 2. "Ladies' Night" Released: 15 December 2003

Ladies Night is the third and final studio album by English girl group Atomic Kitten. It was released by Innocent Records and Virgin Records on 10 November 2003 in the United Kingdom. Named after the same-titled 1979 song by American band Kool & the Gang, the trio reteamed with producers Ash Howes and Martin Harrington, both of whom had contributed to their previous album Feels So Good (2002), to work with them on the majority of the album, while additional production was provided by Ciaron Bell, Julian Gallagher, and Steve Robson, Richard "Biff" Stannard and The True North Music Company. Written and recorded in a time span of seven months, the band co-wrote on eight songs of the album's standard version, with Jenny Frost and Liz McClarnon each credited as songwriters on three tracks, while Natasha Hamilton co-wrote two.

Upon its release, Ladies Night earned largely mixed reviews from music critics many of whom noted a progression from the band's early material but found that the album lacked creativity and variety. It debuted and peaked at number five on the UK Albums Chart, becoming their third consecutive top five album, and was certified Platinum by the British Phonographic Industry (BPI) within its first three weeks of release. Elsewhere, the album reached the top ten in Austria, New Zealand, and Scotland. Ladies Night was preceded by lead single "If You Come to Me," which became a top ten in several countries, while later singles include a cover version of "Ladies Night." The third and final single "Someone like Me" was released on 29 March 2004 and became the group's official last single following the announcement of their indefinite hiatus.

== Background ==
In April 2003, the compilation album Atomic Kitten was released in the United States, which consisted of tracks from their first two albums Right Now (2000) and Feels So Good (2002). It was commercially unsuccessful, although single "The Tide Is High (Get the Feeling)" appeared on the soundtrack for the Disney Channel Original Movie The Lizzie McGuire Movie (2003). Following this, the group opted to focus solely on the European, Oceanian, South African and Asian markets and began work on their third album.

Before recording started, American R&B group Kool & the Gang approached the group about a collaboration for their album of duets, The Hits: Reloaded (2004). Kool & the Gang wanted to record an updated version of their hit "Ladies Night" and were looking for a girl group to sing the lyrics. Atomic Kitten liked the idea and inquired whether they could use it for their next album which was subsequently named Ladies Night in honour of this collaboration. Atomic Kitten spent late 2002 and early 2003 in the studio recording their third studio album. Up until the recording of Ladies Night, the group mainly relied on songwriters, though they had occasionally co-written songs featured on their albums. While recording Ladies Night, they decided to be directly involved in the creation of eight of the fifteen songs.

== Critical reception ==
Professional ratings
Review scores
Source	Rating
AllMusic	3/5 stars
The Guardian	2/5 stars
laut.de	2/5 stars
Yahoo! Music UK	4/10

Caroline Bansal, writing for musicOMH, complimented the album's first three tracks, but noted a "certain uniformity" among the rest of album. She found that "this seems almost wholly due to the dreadful drum machine that appears on practically every number. No matter how soulfully the girls sing, you feel that the insistently chirpy beat will go on regardless to keep them in line, with all the depth of feeling of a metronome. Which is a shame. Some of the songs [...] sound like they could be really strong if they only had a live band to rise above the two-dimensional pop beat." Alexander Cordas from German music website laut.de credited Ladies Night with a "terrible lack of creativity."

AllMusic editor Jon O'Brien rated the album three stars out of five. He found that majority of the "tracks stick with the Stargate-esque watered-down R&B, breezy acoustic pop, and midtempo ballads of its predecessor, Feels So Good [...] There are times on Ladies Night when the girls appear capable of losing their "female Westlife" tag, while the increased creative input is a promising progression from their manufactured early days, but frustratingly, it plays it too safe too often to be considered as anything other than a harmless and slightly forgettable piece of fluff." Betty Clarke from The Guardian felt that the "album reveals the shaky nature of their stature: it has just one prospective hit and a dubious cover of a 1980s single, both lost in a sea of generic disco." Simon P. Ward from Yahoo! Music UK called Ladies Night an "acceptable album from an acceptable act [...] Most of it will definitely soundtrack Saturday afternoons in High Street clothing stores across the land."

== Chart performance ==
Ladies Night debuted and peaked at number five on the UK Albums Chart, selling 48,000 copies in its first week of release. It was a considerable decline from the band's previous two studio albums Right Now (2000) and Feels So Good (2002), both of which had been certified double platinum by the British Phonographic Industry (BPI) and became number-one hits. A steady seller, Ladies Night was however certified platinum by the BPI for the shipment of over 550,000 copies in the United Kingdom.

== Track listing ==
Ladies Night track listing
No.	Title	Writer(s)	Producer(s)	Length
1.	"Ladies Night" (featuring Kool & the Gang)	Ronald Bell; Kool & the Gang	Khalis Bayyan; Leigh Guest; Andy Whitmore^{[a]}; Ash Howes^{[b]}; Martin Harrington^{[b]}	3:08
2.	"Be with You"	Greg Wilson; Tracey Carmen; Martin Foster; Jeff Lynne	Howes; Harrington	3:38
3.	"Don't Go Breaking My Heart"	Jenny Frost; Dominic Thrupp; Mark Ralph; Paul Olawoyin; Paul Wright; Theeyazan Ahmed	Howes; Harrington	3:43
4.	"If You Come to Me"	Richard "Biff" Stannard; Julian Gallagher; Sharon Murphy; Howes; Harrington	Stannard; Gallagher; Howes^{[b]}; Harrington^{[b]}	3:46
5.	"Believer"	Billy Steinberg; Rick Nowels; Jennie Lofgren	Howes; Harrington; Nowels	3:46
6.	"Everything Goes Around"	Frost; Anthony Griffiths; Christopher Griffiths	Howes; Harrington	3:06
7.	"Somebody like You"	Natasha Hamilton; Rob Davis; Howes; Harrington	Howes; Harrington; Davis	3:57
8.	"Nothing in the World"	Steve Robson; Karen Poole; Troy Verges	Robson	3:59
9.	"Always Be My Baby"	Liz McClarnon; Gary Barlow; Eliot Kennedy; Tim Woodcock	The True North Music Company	3:20
10.	"I Won't Be There"	Hamilton; Barlow; Kennedy; Woodcock	The True North Music Company	3:53
11.	"Never Get Over You"	McClarnon; Davis	Howes; Harrington	3:57
12.	"Don't You Know"	Davis; Howes; Harrington	Howes; Harrington; Davis	3:24
13.	"Loving You"	Johnny Pedersen; Karsten Dahlgaard; Maria Christensen; Vincent DeGiorgio	Howes; Harrington	3:11
14.	"Don't Let Me Down"	Frost; Howes; Harrington	Howes; Harrington	3:40
15.	"Someone like Me"	McClarnon; Ciaron Bell	Bell	2:09

Japanese bonus tracks
No.	Title	Writer(s)	Producer(s)	Length
16.	"Eternal Flame" (single version)	Billy Steinberg; Kelly; Susanna Hoffs	Ray Ruffin	3:15
17.	"Whole Again" (2001 version)	McCluskey; Stuart Kershaw; Jem Godfrey; Bill Padley	Engine	3:05
18.	"The Tide Is High (Get the Feeling)"	Holt; Evans; Barrett; Padley; Godfrey	Bill Padley; Jem Godfrey	3:28
19.	"Good Times"	Frost; Nichols; Ben Chapman	Howes; Harrington	3:32

Notes and sample credits

- ^{^[a]} denotes co-producer
- ^{^[b]} denotes additional producer
- "Be with You" contains a sample from "Last Train to London" performed by Electric Light Orchestra.

== Charts ==
=== Weekly charts ===
Weekly chart performance for Ladies Night
Chart (2003)	Peak position
Australian Albums (ARIA)	67
Austrian Albums (Ö3 Austria)	10
Belgian Albums (Ultratop Flanders)	71
Dutch Albums (Album Top 100)	24
European Top 100 Albums (Billboard)	8
German Albums (Offizielle Top 100)	12
Irish Albums (IRMA)	28
New Zealand Albums (RMNZ)	3
Scottish Albums (Official Charts)	4
Swiss Albums (Schweizer Hitparade)	11
UK Albums (Official Charts)	5

=== Year-end charts ===
Year-end chart performance for Ladies Night
Chart (2003)	Position
UK Albums (OCC)	40

== Certifications ==
Certifications for Ladies Night
Region	Certification	Certified units/sales
Austria (IFPI Austria)	Gold	15,000^{*}
United Kingdom (BPI)	Platinum	300,000^{^}
^{*} Sales figures based on certification alone.^{^} Shipments figures based on certification alone.

== Release history ==
Ladies Night release history
Region	Date	Format(s)	Label	Ref.
Austria	7 November 2003	CD; digital download	Innocent; Virgin	
United Kingdom	10 November 2003	CD; digital download	Innocent; Virgin	
United States	2 December 2003	CD; digital download	Innocent; Virgin	
