= Getting to the Point =

Single by Electric Light Orchestra

from the album Balance of Power
- B-side: "Secret Lives"; "ELO Megamix" (12-inch only)
- Released: 1 August 1986
- Recorded: 1985
- Studio: Compass Point, Nassau, Bahamas; Hartmann Digital, Untertrubach, Germany
- Genre: Soft rock; pop
- Length: 4:30
- Label: CBS Associated (US); Epic (UK)
- Songwriter(s): Jeff Lynne
- Producer(s): Jeff Lynne

Electric Light Orchestra singles chronology
"So Serious" (1986)	"Getting to the Point" (1986)	"Destination Unknown" (1990)

"Getting to the Point" is a song by the rock group Electric Light Orchestra (ELO) from their 1986 album Balance of Power. Released in the UK as the last single from the album in August 1986, it was the last original release from the band for 15 years.

== Overview ==
Due to a strike on Epic's distribution department at the time of its release, the single did not make much of an impression on the singles chart. It peaked at number 97 in the UK. There was no release in the rest of Europe.

The lyrics reflect Lynne's feeling trapped by the "ELO machine" at the time. Lynne described how he came up with the lyrics:

I'd been working on another song which I couldn't get right at all, and it was driving me mad. I think that is when I came up with the set of words to 'Getting to the Point'; it was probably frustration. I didn't feel good at the time, and it was supposed to be a sad song. But it's nice to have different atmospheres on the songs, and I think that because they were so instant. I didn't have time to go home and brood over the words and say 'Oh, I'll put that in there and this and that'. With being more instant, they're probably more honest.

ELO writer Barry Delve describes the song as ELO's "last great song" that is "an expertly crafted power ballad that also boasts one of Jeff Lynne's finest vocal performances."

The B-Side of this single is the 1986 Balance of Power album-track "Secret Lives". It was meant to be a separate single outtake as labelled on the Balance of Power album cover (Dutch pressings with JET or EPIC Label Catno. 26467).

There was also a UK 12 inch Epic 3 track version with the "ELO Megamix" on the B-side. The mix featured the songs from A New World Record, Out of the Blue, Discovery, Time and Balance of Power. It was mixed by Paul Dakeyne for DMC.

== Track listing ==
All songs written by Jeff Lynne.

7-inch single

1. "Getting to the Point" – 4:28
2. "Secret Lives" – 3:26

12-inch single

1. "Getting to the Point" – 4:28
2. "ELO Megamix" ("Don't Bring Me Down/Sweet Talkin' Woman/Livin' Thing/Calling America/So Serious/Shine a Little Love/Twilight/Turn to Stone/Hold on Tight") – 9:57
3. "Secret Lives" – 3:26

== Chart positions ==
Chart (1986)	Peak Position
UK Singles (OCC)	97
