= If You Come to Me =

2003 single by Atomic Kitten

Single by Atomic Kitten

from the album Ladies Night
- B-side: "Album Medley"; "So Right"; "Feels So Good"
- Released: 27 October 2003
- Studio: Biffco (Dublin, Ireland)
- Length: 3:44
- Label: Innocent; Virgin
- Songwriters: Julian Gallagher; Martin Harrington; Ash Howes; Sharon Murphy; Richard "Biff" Stannard
- Producers: Julian Gallagher; Richard Biff Stannard

Atomic Kitten singles chronology
"Love Doesn't Have to Hurt" (2003)	"If You Come to Me" (2003)	"Ladies Night" (2003)

Music video
- "If You Come to Me" on YouTube

"If You Come to Me" is a song by British girl group Atomic Kitten. It was written by Julian Gallagher, Martin Harrington, Ash Howes, Sharon Murphy, and Richard "Biff" Stannard for their third studio album, Ladies Night (2003). Production was helmed by Gallagher and Stannard, with Harrington and Howes credited as additional producers. Recording of "If You Come to Me" took place at Stannard's recording studio, Biffco, in Dublin, Ireland. A romantic, soulful uptempo ballad, which the band labeled "classic Atomic Kitten", it talks about a woman's desire to be with her partner.

The song was released as the lead single from Ladies Night on 27 October 2003 in the United Kingdom where it peaked at number three on the UK Singles Chart, becoming the group's fifth consecutive top-five hit. Elsewhere, "If You Come to Me" entered the top five in Hungary, Scotland and on a composite Eurochart Hot 100, and reached the top ten in Austria, Ireland, Germany, New Zealand, Poland, and Switzerland. A CGI-heavy music video, directed by duo Adam Townley and Simon Atkinson, was filmed at the Asylum Studios in North London in early October 2003.

== Background ==
"If You Come to Me" was written by British songwriters and record producers Julian Gallagher and Richard "Biff" Stannard along with Martin Harrington, Ash Howes, and Sharon Murphy. Specially written with Atomic Kitten in their minds, it was suggested for recording after Gallagher and Stannard had spoken to the band's record company managing director. Band member Liz McClarnon elaborated in a 2003 interview with BBC Newsround: "[They] said 'We think we've got a really good Kitten song here'. We then heard it and we thought 'Oh my God definitely!' When we recorded it we loved it [...] We wanted people to know that we weren't going to change our sound like a lot of people do. We wanted to keep with what everybody liked about Atomic Kitten." Recording took place at Stannard's recording studio, Biffco, in Dublin, Ireland, with Gallagher and Stannard also overseeing production.

== Chart performance ==
Atomic Kitten's 12th single overall, "If You Come to Me" was released as the lead single from Ladies Night on 27 October 2003 in the United Kingdom. It debuted and peaked at number three on the UK Singles Chart, becoming the group's fifth consecutive, yet final, top-five hit. The Official Charts Company placed the song 94th on its 2003 year-end singles chart. In 2021, the organisation ranked "If You Come to Me" as Atomic Kitten's eighth-biggest-selling single in the United Kingdom. Elsewhere in Europe, the song reached the top five in Hungary, Scotland and on a composite Eurochart Hot 100, while reaching the top 10 in Austria, Ireland, Germany, Poland and Switzerland. It was the group's last charting single in New Zealand, where it rose to number nine, and their penultimate hit in Australia, where it peaked at number 30.

== Music video ==
A music video for "If You Come to Me" was directed by Adam Townley and Simon Atkinson under their moniker Si & AD and filmed over two days at the Asylum Studios in Perivale, London Borough of Ealing in early October 2003. Largely shot in front of a greenscreen, it has no narrative but instead features on beauty shots and dance routines, intertwined by several costume and make up changes. The video opens with Atomic Kitten near a curtain behind a plain white background. Group members Natasha Hamilton, Jenny Frost, and Liz McClarnon dance behind a plain white background with coloured line patterns coming through, and behind a black background. In the second verse, the band's bodies change colour with butterflies in the sky on them, and it is also shown in the final chorus. During the bridge section of the song, the three girls dance in the rain behind a plain black background.

== Track listings ==
UK CD1 and European CD single
No.	Title	Writer(s)	Producer(s)	Length
1.	"If You Come to Me"	Julian Gallagher; Martin Harrington; Ash Howes; Sharon Murphy; Richard "Biff" Stannard	Stannard; Gallagher; Howes^{[a]}; Harrington^{[a]}	3:44
2.	"Album Medley"	Various: Greg Wilson; Tracey Carmen; Martin Foster; Jeff Lynne; Jenny Frost; Dominic Thrupp; Mark Ralph; Paul Olawoyin; Paul Wright; Theeyazan Ahmed; Billy Steinberg; Rick Nowels; Jennie Lofgren; Johnny Pedersen; Karsten Dahlgaard; Maria Christensen; Vincent DeGiorgio; Natasha Hamilton; Gary Barlow; Eliot Kennedy; Tim Woodcock	Howes; Harrington; Rick Nowels; The True North Music Company	6:57

UK CD2 and Australian CD single
No.	Title	Writer(s)	Producer(s)	Length
1.	"If You Come to Me"	Gallagher; Harrington; Howes; Murphy; Stannard	Stannard; Gallagher; Howes^{[a]}; Harrington^{[a]}	3:44
2.	"So Right"	Hamilton; Ciaron Bell; Dave James	Bell; James	3:32
3.	"Feels So Good"	Kylie Minogue; Steve Anderson	Anderson	3:33

Notes

- ^{^[a]} denotes additional producer
- "Album Medley" is composed of "Be with You", "Don't Go Breaking My Heart", "Loving You", "Believer" and "I Won't Be There."

== Credits and personnel ==
Credits adapted from the liner notes of Ladies Night.

Studio

- Recorded at Biffco Studios (Dublin, Ireland)

Personnel

- Atomic Kitten – vocals
- Julian Gallagher – writing, production
- Martin Harrington – writing, additional production
- Ash Howes – writing, additional production
- Sharon Murphy – writing
- Richard "Biff" Stannard – writing, production
- Alvin Sweeney – recording, engineering
- Keith Uddin – additional production and mix engineering

== Charts ==
=== Weekly charts ===
Chart (2003–2004)	Peak position
Australia (ARIA)	30
Austria (Ö3 Austria Top 40)	6
Belgium (Ultratop 50 Flanders)	26
CIS Airplay (TopHit)	107
Denmark (Tracklisten)	14
Europe (Eurochart Hot 100)	3
Germany (GfK)	10
Hungary (Rádiós Top 40)	5
Ireland (IRMA)	8
Netherlands (Dutch Top 40)	15
Netherlands (Single Top 100)	14
New Zealand (Recorded Music NZ)	9
Norway (VG-lista)	14
Poland (Polish Airplay Charts)	10
Romania (Romanian Top 100)	37
Russia Airplay (TopHit)	94
Scotland Singles (Official Charts)	2
Sweden (Sverigetopplistan)	17
Switzerland (Schweizer Hitparade)	10
Turkey (Turkey Top 100)	14
UK Singles (Official Charts)	3
UK Airplay (Music Week)	15

=== Year-end charts ===
Chart (2003)	Position
Austria (Ö3 Austria Top 40)	69
CIS Airplay (TopHit)	187
Russia Airplay (TopHit)	160
Switzerland (Schweizer Hitparade)	75
UK Singles (OCC)	94

Chart (2004)	Position
Hungary (Rádiós Top 40)	8

Chart (2005)	Position
Hungary (Rádiós Top 40)	62

== Release history ==
Region	Date	Format(s)	Label(s)	Ref.
United Kingdom	27 October 2003	CD	Innocent; Virgin	
Australia	3 November 2003	CD	Innocent; Virgin	
