= Love Doesn't Have to Hurt =

2003 single by Atomic Kitten

Single by Atomic Kitten

from the album Feels So Good
- B-side: "Kissing in the Wind Medley"; "Use Your Imagination"
- Released: 31 March 2003
- Studio: Motor Museum (Liverpool, England)
- Length: 3:38
- Label: Innocent; Virgin
- Songwriters: Susanna Hoffs; Billy Steinberg; Tom Kelly
- Producers: Bill Padley; Jem Godfrey

Atomic Kitten singles chronology
"The Last Goodbye" / "Be with You" (2002)	"Love Doesn't Have to Hurt" (2003)	"If You Come to Me" (2003)

Audio video
- "Love Doesn't Have To Hurt" on YouTube

"Love Doesn't Have to Hurt" is a song by English girl group Atomic Kitten. It was written by Susanna Hoffs of the Bangles along with Billy Steinberg, and Tom Kelly and recorded for the band's second studio album, Feels So Good (2002). Production on "Love Doesn't Have to Hurt" was helmed by Bill Padley and Jem Godfrey, with Martin Harrington and Ash Howes credited as additional producers. Initially recorded by Hoffs, it was later given to Atomic Kitten whose rendition of the Bangles' 1988 song "Eternal Flame" had been a number-one success the year before.

The acoustic-framed mid-tempo ballad was released as the fourth and final single from Feels So Good on 31 March 2003. It peaked at number 4 on the UK Singles Chart, becoming the album's fourth consecutive top five hit in the United Kingdom, and reached number 13 on the Irish Singles Chart, also reaching the top twenty on a composite Eurochart Hot 100. Atomic Kitten reteamed with frequent collaborator Phil Griffin to film a music video for "Love Doesn't Have to Hurt" which depicts them in different rooms in a futuristic house, intercut by group performances.

== Background ==
"Love Doesn't Have to Hurt" was co-written by Susanna Hoffs of American pop rock band the Bangles and spurred by Atomic Kitten's 2001 rendition of their 1988 song "Eternal Flame." Initially recorded for one of Hoff's solo projects, it was eventually given to the band when they began collecting material for their second stzdio album. Billy Steinberg and Tom Kelly are also credited as writers. Production on the album version was overseen by Bill Padley and Jem Godfrey. The single version of "Love Doesn't Have to Hurt" varies from the album version, as the vocals of Natasha Hamilton, Liz McClarnon and Jenny Frost were re-recorded to give the song a more powerful vocal range, and the music had been remastered to give the acoustic-framed mid-tempo ballad a smoother finish. Martin Harrington and Ash Howes are credited as additional producers on this version.

== Chart performance ==
The song debuted and peaked at number four on the UK Singles Chart. This gave Atomic Kitten their ninth top-10 single and sixth consecutive top-five hit in the United Kingdom. However, "Love Doesn't Have to Hurt" quickly fell out of the top 10 the next week, where it gained a place on the charts at number 12. It would remain another nine weeks on the chart. In Ireland, the song reached the top 20, peaking at number 13 on the Irish Singles Chart, and became Feels So Good's only single not to reach the top 10. "Love Doesn't Have to Hurt" was not released elsewhere, but debuted and peaked at number 65 on the Single Top 100 in the Netherlands, where it became Atomic Kitten's lowest-charting single. It remained on the chart for nine weeks.

== Music video ==
Atomic Kitten reteamed with frequent collaborator Phil Griffin to produce a video for "Love Doesn't Have to Hurt". Their sixth video with Griffin, it is set in a plush futuristic apartment with oversized corridors. The video opens with the three girls going into a photo. The first lines are sung by Frost, dressed in a silk bathrobe, who is seen sitting near a sink in a bathroom, while she is looking at some photographs. Beginning with the second verse, the video shifts to McClarnon who is leaving her bedroom to find a corridor filled with helium balloons. When the bridge sets in, Hamilton is seen painting her nails in the living room, while she watches videos on television. In the final chorus, the trio reunites in one of the corridors to perform together.

== Track listings ==
UK CD1
No.	Title	Writer(s)	Producer(s)	Length
1.	"Love Doesn't Have to Hurt"	Billy Steinberg; Tom Kelly; Susanna Hoffs	Bill Padley; Jem Godfrey; Martin Harrington^{[a]}; Ash Howes^{[a]}	3:30
2.	"The Last Goodbye" (Soda Club mix)	Espen Lind; Mikkel Storleer Eriksen; Tor Erik Hermansen; Hallgeir Rustan; Peter Björklund; Daniel Poku	StarGate; Soda Club^{[a]}	6:27
3.	"Kissing in the Wind Medley" (extended)			6:46

UK CD2
No.	Title	Writer(s)	Producer(s)	Length
1.	"Love Doesn't Have to Hurt"	Steinberg; Kelly; Hoffs	Padley; Godfrey; Harrington^{[a]}; Howes^{[a]}	3:30
2.	"Love Doesn't Have to Hurt" (Uptown Full Vocal Master mix)	Steinberg; Kelly; Hoffs	Padley; Godfrey; Harrington^{[a]}; Howes^{[a]}; Uptown^{[a]}	6:20
3.	"Use Your Imagination"	Liz McClarnon; Liz Winstanley; Dave Garnish	Garnish	3:13
4.	"Love Doesn't Have to Hurt" (video)			3:31

UK cassette single
No.	Title	Writer(s)	Producer(s)	Length
1.	"Love Doesn't Have to Hurt"	Steinberg; Kelly; Hoffs	Padley; Godfrey; Harrington^{[a]}; Howes^{[a]}	3:30
2.	"Kissing in the Wind Medley" (extended)			4:01
3.	"Be with You" (Graham Stack/Groove Brothers 7-inch mix)	Greg Wilson; Tracey Carmen; Martin Foster; Jeff Lynne	Harrington; Howes; Graham Stack^{[a]}; Groove Brother^{[a]}	3:31

Notes

- ^{^[a]} denotes additional producer

== Credits and personnel ==
Credits are adapted from the liner notes of Feels So Good.

- Atomic Kitten – vocals
- Carrie Grant – additional vocal production
- Susanna Hoffs – writing
- Tom Kelly – writing
- Jem Godfrey – production
- Martin Harrington – additional production, mixing
- Ash Howes – additional production, mixing
- Bill Padley – production
- Billy Steinberg – writing
- Richard Wilkinson – guitar

== Charts ==
=== Weekly charts ===
Chart (2003)	Peak position
Europe (Eurochart Hot 100)	20
Ireland (IRMA)	13
Netherlands (Single Top 100)	65
Romania (Romanian Top 100)	60
Scotland Singles (Official Charts)	3
UK Singles (Official Charts)	4
UK Airplay (Music Week)	13

=== Year-end charts ===
Chart (2003)	Position
UK Singles (OCC)	131
