= Feels So Good (Atomic Kitten album) =

2002 studio album by Atomic Kitten

Studio album by Atomic Kitten
- Released: 9 September 2002
- Recorded: September 2001 – April 2002
- Studios: Metropolis, London; Wise Buddha; Motor Museum, Liverpool, UK
- Genres: Pop; dance pop
- Length: 51:40
- Label: Virgin
- Producers: Andy McCluskey; Ben Chapman; Bill Padley; Ian Masterson; Jem Godfrey; Martin O'Shea; Natasha Hamilton; Rob Davis; Stargate; Steve Anderson; Stuart Kershaw; Terry Ronald; Tim Orford; Tom Nichols

Atomic Kitten chronology
Right Now (2000)	Feels So Good (2002)	Atomic Kitten (2003)

Singles from Feels So Good
- 1. "It's OK!" Released: 20 May 2002; 2. "The Tide Is High (Get the Feeling)" Released: 26 August 2002; 3. "The Last Goodbye" / "Be With You" Released: 25 November 2002; 4. "Love Doesn't Have to Hurt" Released: 31 March 2003

Feels So Good is the second studio album by girl group Atomic Kitten. It was released by Virgin Records on 9 September 2002. Their first fully original album featuring Jenny Frost, it was initially developed in collaboration with Atomic Kitten founders Andy McCluskey and Stuart Kershaw, but the group parted ways with them prior to the album's release amid creative differences and contractual disputes, enlisting additional contributors, including Bill Padley, Ian Masterson, Jem Godfrey, Steve Anderson, Terry Ronald, Rob Davis, and the Norwegian production team Stargate.

The album received mixed reviews, with some critics praising its playful chemistry and standout disco‑influenced tracks, while others criticized its production as formulaic and repetitive. Feels So Good surpassed Atomic Kitten's debut Right Now (2000), selling 1.5 million copies and debuting at number one in the United Kingdom, making them the second girl group to top both singles and albums charts simultaneously. It also achieved international success, reaching the top ten or twenty across Europe and New Zealand and earning multiple platinum certifications.

The singles from Feels So Good achieved significant commercial success, with "It's OK!" peaking at number three in the UK, the Brit Award-nominated Paragons cover "The Tide Is High (Get the Feeling)" topping multiple national charts and receiving platinum and gold certifications, and "The Last Goodbye" reaching number one in the Czech Republic. The album was further promoted with the simultaneous release of the book Atomic Kitten: So Good, So Far by Ian McLeish, in which the girl group gave an insight look into their early career, as well as their Be with Us Tour, which ran from 2002 to 2003.

== Background ==
Following the success of their debut album Right Now (2000), Atomic Kitten returned to the studio in the fall of 2001 to begin work on their second album. Once again, the group teamed up with OMD members and Atomic Kitten founders, Andy McCluskey and Stuart Kershaw, who wrote the majority of tracks on Right Now. The first recording sessions produced the songs "Walking on the Water", "The Moment You Leave Me", and "No One Loves You (Like I Love You)," all of which were kept for the album. In July 2002, Atomic Kitten sought to terminate their recording agreement with McCluskey and Kershaw, ending their formal involvement in the group's recordings after the agreement had become a source of tension within the band. McCluskey, effectively dismissed and barred from contacting the band, later riticized the record company for its formulaic focus on replicating the success of "Whole Again."

Meanwhile, the Atomic Kitten's management and record label brought in external musicians and producers to work on additional material with the band, including Ciaron Bell, Rob Davis, Tom Nichols, "Whole Again" co-writers Bill Padley and Jem Godfrey, as well as Mikkel Eriksen, Tor Hermansen, and Hallgeir Rustan of the Norwegian production team Stargate. Following their cover of "Eternal Flame" on their previous album, Susanna Hoffs of The Bangles was asked to write a song for the band, which led to the recording of "Love Doesn't Have to Hurt." Singer Kylie Minogue, with whom Davis frequently collaborated, donated the song "Feels So Good," a leftover from her 2001 studio album Fever, to the album. Out of gratitude and because they felt it was a great title, the group decided to name the album after that song. Liz McClarnon, Natasha Hamilton, and Jenny Frost also received co-writing credits on several tracks.

== Promotion ==
"It's OK!," produced by Stargate, was released as the album's lead single on 20 May 2002. In the United Kingdom, the song peaked at number three on the UK Singles Chart and eventually earned a BPI silver certification. It was later named the group's fourth best-selling UK single, while also reaching the top 10 or 20 across several European markets and charting in Australia and New Zealand. Follow-up "The Tide Is High (Get the Feeling)," a cover of 1967's The Paragons song, was released to even bigger commercial success in August 2002, reaching number one in Croatia, Ireland, New Zealand, Scotland, and the United Kingdom, while also securing top-five positions across much of Europe and Australia, including peaks of number two in the Netherlands and top-three placements in Austria, and Germany. Its commercial performance was reinforced by multiple certifications, earning platinum status in the United Kingdom, Australia, and New Zealand, as well as gold certifications in Denmark and Sweden.

"The Last Goodbye," also produced by Stargate, was released as the third single from Feels So Good in November 2002 and became a number-one hit in the Czech Republic, while also reaching the top ten in Portugal and Scotland. In Ireland and the United Kingdom, the song was released as a dual single with the previously unreleased song "Be with You" and peaked at numbers five and two on the Irish and UK Singles Charts, respectively. Alongside "It's OK!" and "The Tide Is High (Get the Feeling)," it would later rank among the group's five best-selling singles. "Love Doesn't Have to Hurt," co-written by Hoffs, Billy Steinberg, and Tom Kelly, was released as the album's fourth and final single in March 2003. The song peaked at number four on the UK Singles Chart, marking the Feels So Good's fourth consecutive top-five hit in the United Kingdom, but it achieved only moderate success in other territories, reaching number 13 at its highest outside the UK.

== Critical reception ==
Professional ratings
Review scores
Source	Rating
AllMusic	3/5 stars
BBC	6/10
Entertainment.ie	2/5 stars
The Guardian	1/5 stars
NME	3/10
Yahoo! Music UK	4/10

Feels So Good received mixed reviews from music critics. AllMusic editor Andy Kellman found that the album was "nearly as solid as Right Now, with more playful chemistry evident between the three members. Though the three biggest hits – "It's OK!," "The Last Goodbye," and a cover of Blondie's cover of "The Tide Is High" – are well-executed, easygoing pop songs, the group is at its best when it takes on the role of a modern disco act (as heard on "Feels So Good," "Love Won't Wait," and "Softer the Touch")." BBC writer Alun Williams called Feels So Good "one of the better CD's within the pop genre." He found that "there are a few gems amongst the numerous tracks," but also remarked that "the album's production is at best unadventurous and at worst repetitive and very unoriginal."

Caroline Sullivan, writing for The Guardian, felt that "the album is mush of a mushness, weighted in favour of system-built uptempo tunes such as the title track, written for them by an apparently listless Kylie Minogue. At least these are marginally better than the ballads, sour little semi-acoustic snippets that sound like Westlife on oestrogen. What this album is crying out for is a kick in the tush from an avenging Kelly Osbourne." British music website Peter Robinson from NME called Feels So Good "a dated collection of by-numbers pop, rarely any more imaginative than their cover of Billie Piper's cover of Blondie's cover of "The Tide Is High." It gets worse: they even forced Kylie to soil her tiny hands, writing the title track." Entertainment.ie wrote that Feels So Good's "peculiarly watered-down brand of R'n'B is like the worst kind of fast food: uniform, tasteless, and forgotten the moment it's been consumed." Writing for Yahoo! Music UK, Jamie Gill concluded that "though the majority of Feels So Good is the kind of muzak you would hear in hell's own lifts, there are a couple of more interesting moments."

== Commercial performance ==
Feels So Good outperformed the band’s debut album, selling 1.5 million copies in just its first five months. In the United Kingdom, it debuted at number one on the UK Albums Chart and the Scottish Albums Chart. The album sold 80,000 copies in its first week, coinciding with the group's single "The Tide Is High (Get the Feeling)" topping the UK Singles Chart the week prior. This achievement made Atomic Kitten only the second girl group, after the Spice Girls, to simultaneously hold the number-one positions on both the UK singles and albums charts. Following the release of the dual single "The Last Goodbye"/"Be with You," the album climbed back into the UK top ten for a further two weeks. Feels So Good was certified gold by the British Phonographic Industry (BPI) on 19 September 2002 and has since reached 2x Platinum status, denoting shipments of 600,000 units.

Elsewhere, the album peaked at number three in Austria and number five on Billboard's European Top 100 Albums chart. In Germany and the Netherlands, it reached number six, while peaking at number seven in Switzerland. Additional top 20 placements included Belgium (number twelve), Denmark (number twelve), Norway (number fifteen), and Hungary (number twenty). The album was certified gold in Austria, Germany, the Netherlands, and Switzerland. It was later certified platinum by the IFPI for sales exceeding one million copies across Europe. In Australia, Feels So Good reached number 21 on the ARIA Albums Chart and was certified platinum, signifying shipments of 70,000 units. In New Zealand, the album peaked at number three on the New Zealand Albums Chart and was certified platinum for shipments of 15,000 units.

== Track listing ==
Feels So Good track listing
No.	Title	Writer(s)	Producer(s)	Length
1.	"It's OK!"	Mikkel Storleer Eriksen; Hallgeir Rustan; Tor Erik Hermansen	Stargate	3:16
2.	"Love Won't Wait"	Rob Davis; Alex von Soos	Davis; Ash Howes^{[a]}; Martin Harrington^{[a]}	3:29
3.	"The Tide Is High (Get the Feeling)"	John Holt; Howard Barrett; Tyrone Evans; Bill Padley; Jem Godfrey	Padley; Godfrey; Carrie Grant^{[b]}	3:25
4.	"Feels So Good"	Kylie Minogue; Steve Anderson	Anderson	3:30
5.	"Walking on the Water"	Andy McCluskey; Stuart Kershaw	McCluskey; Kershaw; Lukas Burton^{[a]}	4:00
6.	"The Moment You Leave Me"	McCluskey; Kershaw; Liz McClarnon	McCluskey; Kershaw	3:28
7.	"The Last Goodbye"	Espen Lind; Amund Bjorklund; Eriksen; Rustan; Hermansen; Daniel Poku	Stargate	3:07
8.	"Love Doesn't Have to Hurt"	Billy Steinberg; Tom Kelly; Susanna Hoffs	Padley; Godfrey; Grant^{[b]}	3:30
9.	"Softer the Touch"	Simon Tauber	Ian Masterson; Terry Ronald	3:53
10.	"The Way That You Are"	Natasha Hamilton; Ciaron Bell	Bell; Hamilton; Tim Orford; Martin O'Shea	3:17
11.	"Baby Don't U Hurt Me"	Tom Nichols; Ben Chapman; Jenny Frost	Nichols; Chapman	2:44
12.	"So Hot"	Nichols; Chapman; Frost	Nichols; Chapman	3:22
13.	"Maybe I'm Right"	Davis; McClarnon	Davis	3:31
14.	"No One Loves You (Like I Love You)"	McCluskey; Kershaw	McCluskey; Kershaw; Sebastian Morawietz^{[c]}	4:00

Argentinian edition / Special edition CD1
No.	Title	Writer(s)	Producer(s)	Length
1.	"It's OK!"	Eriksen; Rustan; Hermansen	Stargate	3:16
2.	"Love Won't Wait"	Davis; Soos	Davis; Howes^{[a]}; Harrington^{[a]}	3:29
3.	"The Tide Is High (Get the Feeling)"	Holt; Barrett; Evans; Padley; Godfrey	Padley; Godfrey; Grant^{[b]}	3:25
4.	"Feels So Good"	Minogue; Anderson	Anderson	3:30
5.	"Walking on the Water"	McCluskey; Kershaw	McCluskey; Kershaw; Burton^{[a]}	4:00
6.	"Be with You"	Greg Wilson; Tracey Carmen; Martin Foster; Jeff Lynne	Howes; Harrington	3:39
7.	"The Moment You Leave Me"	McCluskey; Kershaw; McClarnon	McCluskey; Kershaw	3:28
8.	"The Last Goodbye"	Lind; Bjorklund; Eriksen; Rustan; Hermansen; Poku	Stargate	3:07
9.	"Love Doesn't Have to Hurt"	Steinberg; Kelly; Hoffs	Padley; Godfrey; Grant^{[b]}	3:30
10.	"Softer the Touch"	Simon Tauber	Masterson; Ronald	3:53
11.	"The Way That You Are"	Hamilton; Bell	Bell; Hamilton; Orford; O'Shea	3:17
12.	"Baby Don't U Hurt Me"	Nichols; Chapman; Frost	Nichols; Chapman	2:44
13.	"So Hot"	Nichols; Chapman; Frost	Nichols; Chapman	3:22
14.	"Maybe I'm Right"	Davis; McClarnon	Davis	3:31
15.	"No One Loves You (Like I Love You)"	McCluskey; Kershaw	McCluskey; Kershaw; Morawietz^{[c]}	4:00
16.	"Whole Again" (previously unreleased mix)	McCluskey; Kershaw; Padley; Godfrey	Engine; Padley^{[a]}; Godfrey^{[a]}	3:06

Special edition bonus AVCD
No.	Title	Length
1.	"It's OK!" (Video)	3:16
2.	"The Tide Is High (Get the Feeling)" (Video)	3:25
3.	"Be with You" (Video)	3:40
4.	"The Last Goodbye" (Video)	3:07
5.	"Whole Again" (Video)	3:16
6.	"Eternal Flame" (Video)	3:16
7.	"The Tide Is High (Get the Feeling)" (Groove Brother Edit)	3:20
8.	"It's OK!" (M*A*S*H* Radio Mix)	3:49
9.	"The Last Goodbye" (Soda Club Mix)	6:27
10.	"Be with You" (extended mix)	4:35
11.	"Whole Again" (Whirlwind Mix)	3:05
12.	"Eternal Flame" (album version)	3:35

Notes and sample credits

- ^{^[a]} denotes additional producer
- ^{^[b]} denotes vocal producer
- ^{^[c]} denotes co-producer

== Charts ==
=== Weekly charts ===
Weekly chart performance for Feels So Good
Chart (2002)	Peak position
Australian Albums (ARIA)	21
Austrian Albums (Ö3 Austria)	3
Belgian Albums (Ultratop Flanders)	12
Danish Albums (Hitlisten)	12
Dutch Albums (Album Top 100)	6
European Top 100 Albums (Billboard)	5
French Albums (SNEP)	74
German Albums (Offizielle Top 100)	6
Hungarian Albums (MAHASZ)	20
Irish Albums (IRMA)	5
New Zealand Albums (RMNZ)	3
Norwegian Albums (VG-lista)	15
Scottish Albums (Official Charts)	1
Swedish Albums (Sverigetopplistan)	47
Swiss Albums (Schweizer Hitparade)	7
UK Albums (Official Charts)	1

=== Year-end charts ===
2002 year-end chart performance for Feels So Good
Chart (2002)	Position
Australian Albums (ARIA)	89
Austrian Albums (Ö3 Austria)	61
Dutch Albums (Album Top 100)	56
German Albums (Offizielle Top 100)	87
UK Albums (OCC)	20

2003 year-end chart performance for Feels So Good
Chart (2003)	Position
Dutch Albums (Album Top 100)	78
UK Albums (OCC)	157

== Certifications ==
Certifications for Feels So Good
Region	Certification	Certified units/sales
Australia (ARIA)	Platinum	70,000^{^}
Austria (IFPI Austria)	Gold	15,000^{*}
Germany (BVMI)	Gold	150,000^{^}
Netherlands (NVPI)	Gold	40,000^{^}
New Zealand (RMNZ)	Platinum	15,000^{^}
Switzerland (IFPI Switzerland)	Gold	20,000^{^}
United Kingdom (BPI)	2× Platinum	600,000^{^}
Summaries
Europe (IFPI)	Platinum	1,000,000^{*}
Worldwide	—	1,500,000
^{*} Sales figures based on certification alone.^{^} Shipments figures based on certification alone.
