= Be with You (Atomic Kitten song) =

2002 single by Atomic Kitten

Single by Atomic Kitten

from the album Feels So Good (Special Edition) and Ladies Night
- A-side: "The Last Goodbye"
- B-side: "For Once in My Life"
- Released: 25 November 2002
- Studio: Metropolis (London, England)
- Genre: Dance-pop; disco
- Length: 3:38
- Label: Innocent; Virgin
- Songwriters: Greg Wilson; Tracey Carmen; Martin Foster; Jeff Lynne
- Producers: Ash Howes; Martin Harrington

Atomic Kitten singles chronology
"The Tide Is High (Get the Feeling)" (2002)	"The Last Goodbye" / "Be with You" (2002)	"Love Doesn't Have to Hurt" (2003)

Music video
- "Be with You" on YouTube

"Be with You" is a song by British girl group Atomic Kitten. It was written by songwriting trio Bionic, consisting of Greg Wilson, Tracey Carmen and Martin Foster, and recorded for the reissue of the band's second album Feels So Good (2002). Production was helmed by Ash Howes and Martin Harrington, based on Bionic's original track. The disco-fused dance pop song is an adaptation of "Last Train to London" (1979) by English rock band Electric Light Orchestra. Due to the inclusion of the sample, Jeff Lynne is also credited as a songwriter.

In Ireland and the United Kingdom, "Be with You" was released on a double A-side along with "The Last Goodbye", both serving as the album's third single. It peaked at number five and number two on the Irish and UK Singles Charts, respectively. Elsewhere, it was released as the fourth single from Feels So Good in early to mid-2003 and became a top-10 hit in Australia, Hungary, and Poland. An accompanying music video, directed by Jake Nava, is set inside a nightclub. In support of its release, "Be with You" was added to the set list of most of their following concert tours, including The Big Reunion concert series in 2013.

== Background ==
"Be with You" was written by Liverpool-based trio Bionic, consisting of Greg Wilson, Tracey Carmen, and Martin Foster. In 1999, Foster had the idea and sampled the instrumental strings and chorus segments of "Last Train to London" (1979) by English rock band Electric Light Orchestra, written by Jeff Lynne, to create a sketch of a disco track with the notion of making a club track that could be a hit for seeing in the new millennium. Carmen and Wilson heard the potential and collaborated with Foster to take the idea further. Wilson penned the verse lyrics and, in fact, wrote a third verse that was never used.

With Bionic having signed a production deal with Innocent Records, they began auditioning a number of female singers to front the single. However, it was soon decided that the song would be an ideal disco track for Atomic Kitten, and the label had demos mixed by other production teams, including Ash Howes and Martin Harrington. Mixing on "Be with You" was also helmed by Howes, while engineering was overseen by Richard Wilkinson and assistant Rohan Onract. Along with Howes and Harrington's mix, Innocent Records released two 12" promos featuring remixes of the original Bionic track as well as mixes by Olav Basovski and MaUVe.

== Chart performance ==
In Ireland and the United Kingdom, Virgin Records released "Be with You" on a double A-single along with album cut "The Last Goodbye". Both songs served as the album's third and fourth single, respectively. In the United Kingdom, it became the band's eighth top-10 hit, peaking at number two on the UK Singles Chart in its first week of release. It stayed on the chart for 12 weeks, and managed to sell 182,695 copies in the UK alone. In 2012, the Official Charts Company named "The Last Goodbye"/"Be with You" the group's fifth best-selling single after "Whole Again", "The Tide Is High (Get the Feeling)", "Eternal Flame" and "It's OK!."

The single also became Atomic Kitten's third top-five hit in Ireland, where it peaked at number five on the Irish Singles Chart. Elsewhere released as a standalone single during the first quarter of 2003, "Be with You" reached the top 40 on the majority of the charts it appeared on. In New Zealand, the song went straight in at number 11, just missing the top 10. It also was a top 20 hit in Austria, Portugal, and the Netherlands. Although their lowest charting hit in Denmark, it still managed to peak at number 20. In Germany and Switzerland, the song became a top-30 hit, and in Belgium and Sweden, the single entered the top 40.

== Music video ==
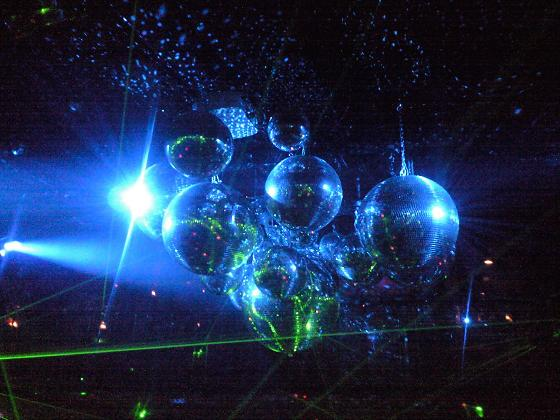
The music video for "Be with You" was heavily influenced by the 1970s disco sound of the song.

The accompanying music video for "Be with You" was directed by British filmmaker Jake Nava. It marked Atomic Kitten's fourth consecutive collaboration with Nava following the production of the Feels So Good visuals for "It's OK!", "The Tide Is High (Get the Feeling)" and "The Last Goodbye". The video was filmed on a sound stage in October 2002 and shot back-to-back with the video for "The Last Goodbye." According to band member Liz McClarnon, the nightclub setting as well as their individual stylings were heavily influenced by the 1970s disco sound of the song. The video makes heavy use of laser-flashing.

In the music video, the band members portray a group of friends celebrating at a nightclub. The video opens with the doors opening in the club. McClarnon, Natasha Hamilton, and Jenny Frost are dancing on the crowded dancefloor, while the video alternates between both the disco floor, laser scenes, and solo shots throughout. Hamilton is seen on the chairs in a pub, McClarnon is near a wall and Frost is lying on the dancefloor. During the bridge section, they turn the volume down.

== Track listings ==
=== Double A-side release ===
"The Last Goodbye" / "Be with You" – UK CD1
No.	Title	Length
1.	"The Last Goodbye"	3:07
2.	"Be with You" (radio edit)	3:38
3.	"Be with You" (Milky 7-inch edit)	3:34
4.	"The Last Goodbye" (video)	3:07

"Be with You" / "The Last Goodbye" – UK CD2
No.	Title	Length
1.	"Be with You" (radio version)	3:38
2.	"The Last Goodbye"	3:07
3.	"For Once in My Life"	3:48
4.	"Be with You" (video)	3:38

"The Last Goodbye" / "Be with You" – UK cassette single
No.	Title	Length
1.	"The Last Goodbye"	3:07
2.	"Be with You" (radio version)	3:38
3.	"Be with You" (extended version)	4:35

=== Solo release ===
Australian CD single
No.	Title	Length
1.	"Be with You" (radio version)	3:38
2.	"Be with You" (Milky 7-inch edit)	3:34
3.	"Be with You" (Graham Stack/Groove Brother remix)	5:36
4.	"Be with You" (extended mix)	4:35
5.	"Be with You" (Milky remix)	6:27

== Credits and personnel ==
Credits adapted from the liner notes of Ladies Night.

- Tracey Carmen – original production, writing
- Martin Foster – original production, writing
- Jenny Frost – vocals
- Natasha Hamilton – vocals
- Martin Harrington
- Ash Howes – mixing, production
- Jeff Lynne – writing
- Liz McClarnon – vocals
- Rohan Onract – engineering assistance
- Richard Wilkinson – engineering
- Greg Wilson – original production, writing

== Charts ==
=== Weekly charts ===
Chart (2002–2003)	Peak position
Australia (ARIA)	10
Austria (Ö3 Austria Top 40)	34
Belgium (Ultratop 50 Flanders)	29
Belgium (Ultratip Bubbling Under Wallonia)	11
Denmark (Tracklisten)	18
Europe (Eurochart Hot 100)	13
France (SNEP)	82
Germany (GfK)	36
Hungary (Rádiós Top 40)	6
Hungary (Single Top 40)	6
Ireland (IRMA) with "The Last Goodbye"	5
Italy (FIMI)	39
Netherlands (Dutch Top 40)	27
Netherlands (Single Top 100)	35
New Zealand (Recorded Music NZ)	15
Poland (Polish Airplay Charts)	5
Portugal (AFP)	9
Romania (Romanian Top 100)	23
Scotland Singles (Official Charts) with "The Last Goodbye"	2
Sweden (Sverigetopplistan)	43
Switzerland (Schweizer Hitparade)	39
Turkey (Türkiye Top 100)	37
UK Singles (Official Charts) with "The Last Goodbye"	2
UK Airplay (Music Week)	29

=== Year-end charts ===
Chart (2002)	Position
Ireland (IRMA)	66
UK Singles (OCC)	88

Chart (2003)	Position
Colombia (B & V Marketing)	3

== Release history ==
Region	Date	Format(s)	Label(s)	Ref.
United Kingdom	25 November 2002	CD; cassette	Innocent; Virgin	
Australia	20 January 2003	CD	Innocent; Virgin	

== MAX cover version ==
"Be with You"

Single by MAX

from the album Jewel of Jewels
- Released: 30 June 2004
- Genre: Eurobeat; J-pop
- Length: 14:59
- Label: Avex Trax
- Songwriters: Greg Wilson, Tracey Carmen, Martin Foster, Jeff Lynne
- Producers: Gee & Satoshi Hidaka (GTS)

MAX singles chronology
"Love Screw" (2003)	"Be with You" (2004)	"Nirai Kanai" (2005)

"Be with You" was covered in Japanese by J-pop group MAX as their 27th single and their last on the main avex trax label before the group was moved to the Vision Factory associated avex subsidiary, Sonic Groove. The song was used as the image song for FamilyMart Dream Match.

=== Track listing ===
#	Title	Songwriters	Time
1.	"Be With You"	Keiko Yamamoto, Jeff Lynne	4:10
2.	"Don't Lose Yourself"	DJ Pine, Yasushi Sasamoto	3:21
3.	"Be With You (Instrumental)"	Jeff Lynne	4:10
4.	"Don't Lose Yourself (Instrumental)"	Yasushi Sasamoto	3:20

=== Personnel and production ===
==== Be with You ====
- Production - Gee & Satoshi Hidaka (GTS)
- Arrangement - Satoshi Hadaka
- Programming - Satoshi Hadaka
- Mixing - Yoshiaki Onishi
- Recording - Sayuri Taguchi

==== Don't Lose Yourself ====
- Synthesizer Programming - Yasushi Sasamoto
- Electric Guitar - Nozomi Furukawa
- Electric Sitar - Nozomi Furukawa
- Mixing - Junya Endo
- Recording - Sayuri Taguchi

==== Charts ====
Oricon sales chart (Japan)

Release	Chart	Peak position	Sales total
30 June 2004	Oricon Weekly Singles Chart	34	5,104
