= I Won't Be There =

I Won't Be There may refer to:

- "I Won't Be There", a 2002 song by Simple Plan from No Pads, No Helmets...Just Balls
- "I Won't Be There", a 2003 song by Atomic Kitten from Ladies Night
