= So Serious (song) =

Single by Electric Light Orchestra

from the album Balance of Power
- B-side: "Endless Lies" (US); "A Matter of Fact" (UK); "A Matter of Fact" (alternate lyrics, 12-inch only) (UK)
- Released: 18 April 1986 (US); 2 May 1986 (UK)
- Recorded: 1985
- Studio: Compas Point, Nassau, Bahamas; Hartmann Digital, Untertrubach, Germany
- Genre: Pop rock
- Length: 2:42
- Label: CBS Associated (US); Epic (UK)
- Songwriter(s): Jeff Lynne
- Producer(s): Jeff Lynne

Electric Light Orchestra singles chronology
"Calling America" (1986)	"So Serious" (1986)	"Getting to the Point" (1986)

Music video
- "So Serious" on YouTube

"So Serious" is a song by the rock music group Electric Light Orchestra (ELO) from their 1986 album Balance of Power, released in the UK as the second single from the album in 1986.

== Overview ==
The song's lyrics hint at Jeff Lynne's growing disenchantment with his involvement with ELO at this point; much like the majority of the songs from the album, the lyrical content was in sharp contrast to the upbeat synthpop of the album.

On this heavy-hearted record [Balance of Power] with an ironically cheerful musical sound and no strings whatsoever, songs like "So Serious" and "Getting To The Point" could be ruing the loss of a romance, but both are indicative of Lynne's feelings about the group that had been the focus of his musical life for so many years. 'I guess we've really been out of touch,' he sings in the former, the latter he mourns, 'It's getting to the point of no return/And all that I can do is stand and watch it burn.'

— Ira Robbins

ELO writer Barry Delve describes it as "a cheerful canter that betrays a darker lyric about the breakdown of a relationship and wanting to 'talk it over'" and a "pleasant enough pop song, reminiscent of something the Cars might have done in their early years but...lightweight by ELO standards."

There was also a UK 12 inch EPIC three-track version with "A Matter of Fact (Alternate Lyrics)" on the B-Side.

== Reception ==
Cash Box said it "has a classic ELO melody hook" and "a serious shot for wide radio attention."

Delve says it has "at least four great hooks" but with "one quite irritating hook" and that overall the song is "very much a chorus in search of a song." Biographer and music writer John Van der Kiste called it a "deceptively upbeat number, failing to conceal a sad theme, with the narrator lying awake night after night as he tries to fit it all together."

== Track listing ==
All songs written by Jeff Lynne.

7-inch single

1. "So Serious" – 2:38
2. "A Matter of Fact" – 4:04

12-inch single

1. "So Serious" – 2:38
2. "A Matter of Fact" – 4:04
3. "A Matter of Fact" (alternate lyrics) – 3:49

12-inch single

1. "So Serious" - 2:38
2. "A Matter of Fact" - 4:04
3. "Destination Unknown" - 4:10

== Chart positions ==
Chart (1986)	Peak Position
UK Singles Chart	77
