= Last Train to London =

- UK single

Single by Electric Light Orchestra

from the album Discovery
- A-side: "Confusion" (UK)
- B-side: "Down Home Town" (US)
- Released: 9 November 1979 (UK); January 1980 (US)
- Recorded: 1979
- Studio: Musicland Studios, Munich, West Germany
- Genre: Disco
- Length: 4:31
- Label: Jet
- Songwriter: Jeff Lynne
- Producer: Jeff Lynne

Electric Light Orchestra singles chronology
"Confusion" (1979)	"Last Train to London" (1979)	"I'm Alive" (1980)

Discovery track listing
- 9 tracks Side one: 1. "Shine a Little Love"; 2. "Confusion"; 3. "Need Her Love"; 4. "The Diary of Horace Wimp"; Side two: 5. "Last Train to London"; 6. "Midnight Blue"; 7. "On the Run"; 8. "Wishing"; 9. "Don't Bring Me Down"

Music video
- "Last Train to London" on YouTube

"Last Train to London" is a song from the English rock band Electric Light Orchestra (ELO), the fifth track from their album Discovery.

The song was released in 1979 in the UK as a double A-side single with "Confusion". It peaked at number 8 in the UK Singles Chart. However, in the US the two songs were released separately, with "Confusion" in late 1979 followed by "Last Train to London" in early 1980. It peaked at number 39 on the Billboard Hot 100.

== Background ==
There was a certain period when it seemed we spent years on trains going back and forth from Birmingham to the various TV and radio stations in London.

— Discovery remaster (2001), Jeff Lynne

== Critical reception ==
Billboard described the song as having a "catchy pop melody with Beatlesque vocal qualities and a smooth layered sound." Cash Box said that the song has "a frothy pop melody" and "a bouncy R&B-tinged rhythm line," making it sound somewhat like Heatwave's 1977 single "Boogie Nights." Record World said that "The electronic dance beat and lilting vocals are as timely as they are engaging."

Something Else! critic S. Victor Aaron found it to be "more formulaic" than "Shine a Little Love", the other "disco thumper hit from Discovery."

== Personnel ==
According to JeffLynneSongs.com

- Jeff Lynne – vocals, guitar, piano, synthesizer
- Bev Bevan – drums, percussion
- Richard Tandy – grand piano, synthesizer, electric piano, clavinet
- Kelly Groucutt – bass, vocals

=== Additional personnel ===
- Louis Clark – orchestra conductor

== Charts ==
=== Weekly charts ===
Chart (1979/80)	Peak position
Irish Singles Chart	9
UK Singles Chart	8
Canada (RPM)	28
US Billboard Hot 100	39
US Cash Box Top 100 Singles	36

=== Certifications ===
Region	Certification	Certified units/sales
New Zealand (RMNZ)	Gold	15,000^{‡}
Spain (Promusicae)	Gold	50,000^{‡}
United Kingdom (BPI)	Silver	250,000^{^}
United Kingdom (BPI) Sales since 2004	Silver	200,000^{‡}
^{^} Shipments figures based on certification alone.^{‡} Sales+streaming figures based on certification alone.

== Atomic Kitten sample ==
In 2002, British girl group Atomic Kitten sampled the hook of the song in their single "Be with You". The song was released as a double A-side with the song "The Last Goodbye". The single peaked at No. 2 in the UK.
