= Tyrone Evans =

Jamaican musician (died 2000)

Tyrone Evans (died 2000) was a Jamaican reggae singer and musicians. He was one of the founding members of the rocksteady group The Paragons, who had a worldwide hit song with "The Tide Is High".

With Bob Andy and Coxsone Dodd, Evans recorded a single, "I Don't Care", and recorded with Leslie Kong. By the late 1970s he recorded for Studio One, and again with Dodd released the single "How Sweet It Is". He worked on two more Paragons albums, both unsuccessful, and moved to New York, where he recorded with Lloyd Barnes on his Wackies label, and released Tyrone Evans Sings Bullwachies Style. For a while he was back in Jamaica, where in 1983 he recorded with Winston Riley. More material recorded with Evans remains unreleased. He died of cancer in New York in 2000.
