= Confusion (Electric Light Orchestra song) =

- UK single

Single by Electric Light Orchestra

from the album Discovery
- A-side: "Last Train to London" (UK)
- B-side: "Poker" (US)
- Released: 8 October 1979 (US)
- Recorded: 1979
- Studio: Musicland Studios, Munich
- Genre: Pop rock
- Length: 3:42
- Label: Jet
- Songwriter: Jeff Lynne
- Producer: Jeff Lynne

Electric Light Orchestra singles chronology
"Don't Bring Me Down" (1979)	"Confusion" (1979)	"Last Train to London" (1979)

Discovery track listing
- 9 tracks Side one: 1. "Shine a Little Love"; 2. "Confusion"; 3. "Need Her Love"; 4. "The Diary of Horace Wimp"; Side two: 5. "Last Train to London"; 6. "Midnight Blue"; 7. "On the Run"; 8. "Wishing"; 9. "Don't Bring Me Down"

Music video
- "Confusion" on YouTube

"Confusion" is the second song from the 1979 Electric Light Orchestra (ELO) album Discovery. It features 12-string acoustic guitar and vocoder.

It was released in the UK as a double A-side single with "Last Train to London". It peaked at number 8 in the UK Singles Chart, making it the fourth consecutive top 10 single to be taken from the Discovery album. In the United States the song was released as a single with "Poker" on the B-side becoming a more modest hit, reaching number 37 on the Billboard Hot 100.

Billboard rated "Confusion" as "a superbly crafted single," describing it as "a mid-tempo rock track that mixes a Beatlesque sound with a hint of disco." Cash Box called it a "bubbly Lynne concoction, mixing glossy pop melody with alternately grandiose and circus-like keyboard fills" and praised the song's hook and craftsmanship." Record World called it a "mellifluous, pop disc with the everpresent falsetto vocals & keyboard gymnastics."

I'd just got hold of the very latest synthesizer, the Yamaha CS-80. The song is based entirely on the sound it made.

— Discovery remaster (2001), Jeff Lynne

== Charts ==
Chart (1979–80)	Peak position
Austrian Ö3 Austria Top 40	5
Canadian RPM Top Singles	20
German Media Control Singles Chart	6
Irish Singles Chart	9
New Zealand (RIANZ)	19
South African Singles Chart	10
UK Singles Chart	8
US Billboard Hot 100	37
US Billboard Adult Contemporary	41
US Cash Box Top 100 Singles	47
