= The Diary of Horace Wimp =

Single by Electric Light Orchestra

from the album Discovery
- B-side: "Down Home Town"
- Released: 21 July 1979
- Recorded: 1979, Musicland Studios, Munich
- Length: 4:17
- Label: Jet
- Songwriter: Jeff Lynne
- Producer: Jeff Lynne

Electric Light Orchestra singles chronology
"Shine a Little Love" (1979)	"The Diary of Horace Wimp" (1979)	"Don't Bring Me Down" (1979)

Discovery track listing
- 9 tracks Side one: 1. "Shine a Little Love"; 2. "Confusion"; 3. "Need Her Love"; 4. "The Diary of Horace Wimp"; Side two: 5. "Last Train to London"; 6. "Midnight Blue"; 7. "On the Run"; 8. "Wishing"; 9. "Don't Bring Me Down"

"The Diary of Horace Wimp" is the fourth track on the Electric Light Orchestra album Discovery, written by Jeff Lynne.

Released in July 1979 as a single, the song is Beatlesque in nature and became a Top Ten hit in the UK and Ireland. The lyrics describe a week in the life of a repressed man named Horace who wants to express his affection towards a woman he meets, and overcomes his shy nature with the help of "a voice from above." The day Saturday is omitted – this is because, as explained by Jeff Lynne: "The football match is played on a Saturday".

The music video references Citizen Kane in its ending, showing a closeup of Jeff Lynne saying "Horace Wimp," echoing Orson Welles' character in the film saying "Rosebud" as he dies.

A song about a lucky lad who somehow defies the odds and gets the girl. Really wild use of the vocoder.

— Jeff Lynne

== B-side ==
The B-side was "Down Home Town", which first appeared on the band's fifth album Face the Music. It also featured as the flip side to the US single "Last Train to London".

"Down Home Town" contains an intro with a backmasked message, the backing chorus of another song on the Face the Music album, "Waterfall": "Face the mighty waterfall, face the mighty waterfall." This song includes an orchestral intro (after the "Waterfall" refrain) and a similar ending. These reverse recorded words were only used because of the sound effect.

== Chart positions ==
Chart (1979)	Peak position
Australia (Kent Music Report)	48
Ireland (IRMA)	10
UK Singles (Official Charts)	8
West Germany (GfK)	52
