= It's OK! (Atomic Kitten song) =

2002 single by Atomic Kitten

Single by Atomic Kitten

from the album Feels So Good
- B-side: "Megamix"; "True Friends"
- Released: 20 May 2002
- Recorded: Metropolis
- Length: 3:16
- Label: Innocent; Virgin
- Songwriters: Mikkel Storleer Eriksen; Tor Erik Hermansen; Hallgeir Rustan
- Producer: Stargate

Atomic Kitten singles chronology
"You Are" (2001)	"It's OK!" (2002)	"The Tide Is High (Get the Feeling)" (2002)

Music video
- "It's OK!" on YouTube

"It's OK!" is a song by British girl group Atomic Kitten for their second studio album, Feels So Good (2002). It was written by Norwegian musicians Hallgeir Rustan, Mikkel Storleer Eriksen and Tor Erik Hermansen and one out of several songs they produced for the trio under their production moniker Stargate. "It's OK!" features an instrumentation consisting essentially of acoustic guitars, soft drums, and synthesized strings. Lyrically, it has the protagonist reminiscing about an emotionally unfruitful relationship with a former loved one from which she has since moved on for the better.

Virgin Records released the song as the lead single from Feels So Good on 20 May 2002. Another commercial success for Atomic Kitten, it became the band's sixth top ten hit on the UK Singles Chart, peaking at number three, and reached the top ten in several European nations, including Austria, Denmark, Ireland, Scotland, and Switzerland. An accompanying music video for "It's OK!" was directed by Jake Nava and filmed in South Africa in April 2002. It features the trio enjoying a sunny day at the coastline. To further promote "It's OK!", the band performed the song during several televised appearances and at the Party in the Park. In addition, the song was added to the set list of most of their following concert tours, including The Big Reunion concert series in 2013.

== Background ==
"It's OK!" was written by Hallgeir Rustan, Mikkel Storleer Eriksen and Tor Erik Hermansen, a trio of Norwegian musicians who work under the production moniker Stargate. It is one out of two tracks they contributed to parent album Feels So Good (2002), the other being "The Last Goodbye". Recording took place at the Metropolis Studios in London and was overseen by Neil Tucker, while mixing was helmed at the StarGate Studios in Norway.

== Chart performance ==
"It's OK!" was selected as the lead single from Atomic Kitten's second studio album Feel So Good (2002). A worldwide success, it sold over 400,000 copies in total. In the United Kingdom, the song debuted and peaked at number three on the UK Singles Chart, selling 82,000 copies in its first week. It became the group's third non-consecutive top five single. "It's OK!" was the 35th best-selling single of 2002 in the UK, selling 218,346 copies and earning a silver certification from the British Phonographic Industry (BPI). In 2012, the Official Charts Company named "It's OK!" the group's fourth best-selling single in the United Kingdom.

Elsewhere, "It's OK!" reached the forty on the majority of the charts it appeared on. It entered the top 10 in Austria, Ireland, and Switzerland and the top 20 in Germany, Spain, and Wallonia. In Denmark, it became Atomic Kitten's highest-charting single, peaking at number nine. In Flanders, "It's OK!" it peaked at number 33, while in the Netherlands, it peaked at number 21 on the Dutch Top 40. In France, the song peaked at number 37, staying in the top 40 for two weeks. In Australia, the song peaked at number 24. It was more successful in neighboring New Zealand, reaching number 16 and becoming the group's fifth top 40 hit in that country.

== Music video ==
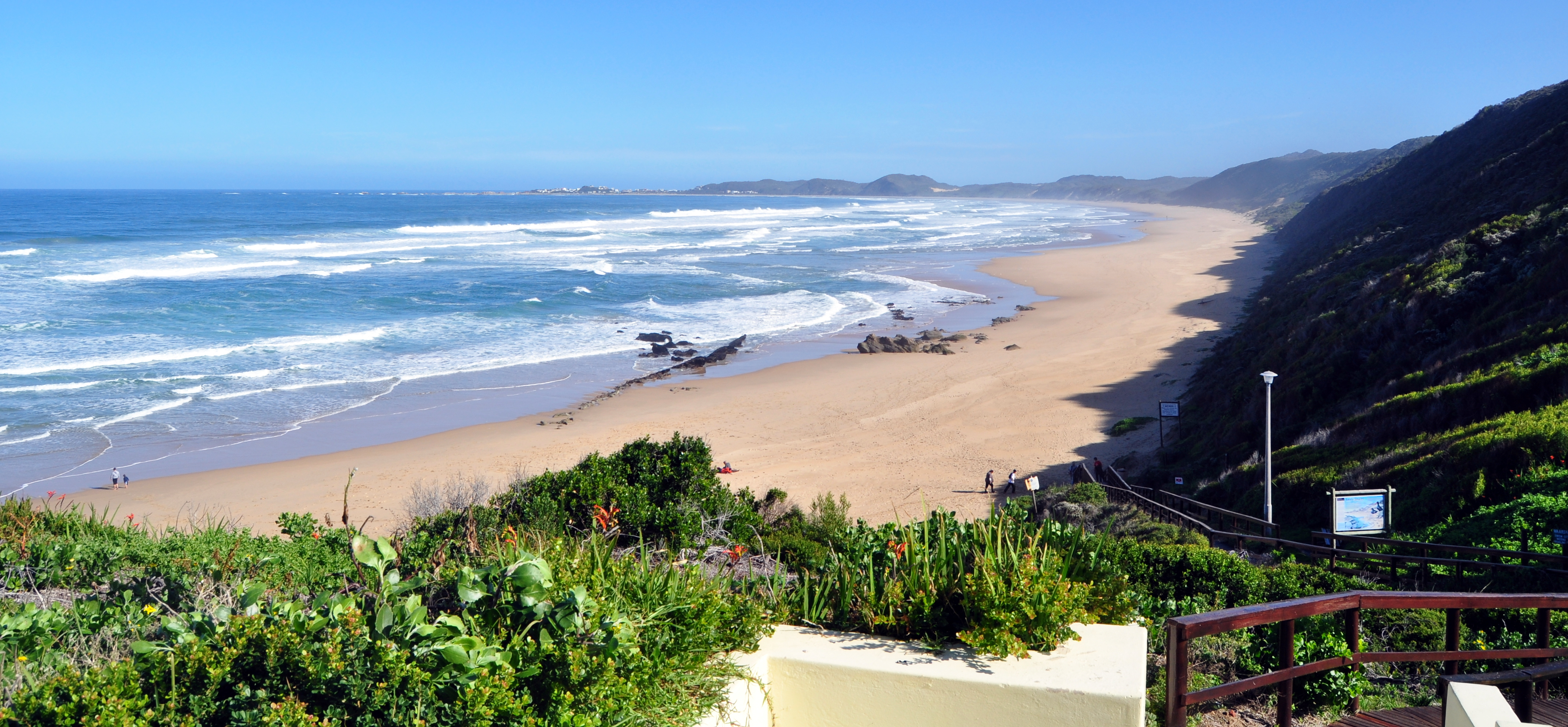
The music video for "It's OK!" was filmed in various locations throughout the South African coast.

The accompanying music video for "It's OK!" was directed by British filmmaker Jake Nava and filmed in South Africa in April 2002. In the clip, they portray a trio who have all split up with their boyfriends and decide to take a spontaneous holiday, doing activities such as sunbathing and paddling in the sea. The group then venture the coastline after jumping into a car, which Jenny Frost is driving; admiring the scenery and singing along to the song. During the bridge section of the song, the group attend a party in a bar at the beach, dancing with several people in the evening. During this, it occasionally switches to the group dancing on a pier, during the tranquil sunset. The video then ends with the girls sitting around a campfire, in the dead of night, with the party still in mid-conflict. Throughout the process of the video, the girls are constantly staring at different men in the bar at night.

== Track listings ==
UK CD1
No.	Title	Writer(s)	Producer(s)	Length
1.	"It's OK!"	Mikkel Storleer Eriksen; Tor Erik Hermansen; Hallgeir Rustan	Stargate	3:15
2.	"Megamix"			6:00
3.	"Whole Again"	Andy McCluskey; Stuart Kershaw; Jem Godfrey; Bill Padley	Engine; Pete Craigie^{[a]}; Pat O'Shaugnessy^{[a]}	3:04
4.	"Whole Again" (US version – video)			3:07

UK CD2
No.	Title	Writer(s)	Producer(s)	Length
1.	"It's OK!"	Eriksen; Hermansen; Rustan	Stargate	3:15
2.	"It's OK!" (M*A*S*H radio edit)	Eriksen; Hermansen; Rustan	Stargate; M*A*S*H^{[a]}	3:49
3.	"You Are"	Paul Gendler; Wayne Hector; Steve Mac; Ali Tennant	Mac	3:27
4.	"It's OK!" (video)			3:16

UK cassette single
No.	Title	Writer(s)	Producer(s)	Length
1.	"It's OK!"	Eriksen; Hermansen; Rustan	Stargate	3:15
2.	"Megamix"			6:00
3.	"True Friends"	Jenny Frost; Liz Winstanley; Dave Garnish	Garnish	3:18

European maxi-single
No.	Title	Writer(s)	Producer(s)	Length
1.	"It's OK!"	Eriksen; Hermansen; Rustan	Stargate	3:15
2.	"It's OK!" (M*A*S*H radio edit)	Eriksen; Hermansen; Rustan	Stargate; M*A*S*H^{[a]}	3:49
3.	"You Are"	Paul Gendler; Wayne Hector; Steve Mac; Ali Tennant	Mac	3:27

Notes

- ^{^[a]} denotes additional producer

== Credits and personnel ==
Credits adapted from the liner notes of Feels So Good.

- Mikkel Storleer Eriksen – production, writing
- Jenny Frost – vocals
- Natasha Hamilton – vocals
- Tor Erik Hermansen – production, writing
- Trond Hillestad – mixing
- Liz McClarnon – vocals
- Hallgeir Rustan – production, writing
- Neil Tucker – recording

== Charts ==
=== Weekly charts ===
Chart (2002)	Peak position
Australia (ARIA)	24
Austria (Ö3 Austria Top 40)	9
Belgium (Ultratop 50 Flanders)	33
Belgium (Ultratip Bubbling Under Wallonia)	12
Denmark (Tracklisten)	9
Europe (Eurochart Hot 100)	17
France (SNEP)	37
Germany (GfK)	18
Hungary (Rádiós Top 40)	19
Ireland (IRMA)	7
Italy (FIMI)	38
Netherlands (Dutch Top 40)	21
Netherlands (Single Top 100)	29
New Zealand (Recorded Music NZ)	16
Poland Airplay (Music & Media)	14
Poland (Polish Airplay Charts)	29
Romania (Romanian Top 100)	16
Scottish Singles Sales (Official Charts)	2
Spain (Promusicae)	13
Sweden (Sverigetopplistan)	21
Switzerland (Schweizer Hitparade)	7
Turkey (Türkiye Top 20)	15
UK Singles (Official Charts)	3
UK Airplay (Music Week)	8

=== Year-end charts ===
Chart (2002)	Position
Austria (Ö3 Austria Top 40)	53
Germany (Media Control)	80
Ireland (IRMA)	60
Switzerland (Schweizer Hitparade)	37
UK Singles (OCC)	35
UK Airplay (Music Week)	44

== Certifications ==
Region	Certification	Certified units/sales
United Kingdom (BPI)	Silver	200,000^{^}
^{^} Shipments figures based on certification alone.

== Release history ==
Region	Date	Format(s)	Label(s)	Ref.
United Kingdom	20 May 2002	CD; cassette	Innocent; Virgin	
Australia	8 July 2002	CD	Innocent; Virgin	
