= The Tide Is High =

1967 single by the Paragons

Single by the Paragons

from the album On the Beach
- A-side: "Only a Smile"
- Released: 1967
- Genre: Rocksteady
- Length: 2:43
- Label: Treasure Isle
- Producer: Duke Reid

Alternative cover

"The Tide Is High" is a 1967 rocksteady song originally written and performed by Jamaican singer John Holt and his group the Paragons for their album On the Beach. The track was produced by Duke Reid for his Treasure Isle label. The song gained international attention in 1980, when a cover version by the American band Blondie became a US and UK number one hit. The song topped the UK Singles Chart again in 2002 with a version by the British girl group Atomic Kitten and the Canadian rapper Kardinal Offishall had a minor hit with his interpretation in 2008.

== The Paragons version ==
"The Tide Is High" was originally recorded by the Paragons (the rocksteady vocal trio of which John Holt was a member) and accompanied by Tommy McCook and the Supersonic Band for their 1967 album On the Beach. It was produced by Duke Reid and released as a 7-inch single on Reid's Treasure Isle and Trojan labels and as the B-side of the single "Only a Smile".

The song features the violin of "White Rum" Raymond and was popular in Jamaica as well as in the UK when a deejay version by U-Roy was released in 1971. Both tracks from the single were included on the 1970 collection Version Galore.

=== Track list ===
1. "Only a Smile"
2. "The Tide Is High" – 2:53

== Blondie version ==
"The Tide Is High"

Single by Blondie

from the album Autoamerican
- B-side: "Susie and Jeffrey"
- Released: October 31, 1980
- Studio: United Western, Hollywood, California
- Genre: Reggae; calypso; rocksteady; pop; new wave
- Length: 4:40 (album version); 3:54 (single edit)
- Label: Chrysalis
- Producer: Mike Chapman

Blondie singles chronology
"Atomic" (1980)	"The Tide Is High" (1980)	"Rapture" (1981)

Music video
- "The Tide Is High" on YouTube

"The Tide Is High" was covered by the American new wave band Blondie in 1980, in a reggae style that included horns and strings. It was released as the lead single from the band's fifth album Autoamerican (1980), giving Blondie their third number 1 single on the US Billboard Hot 100 chart and their fifth on the UK singles chart. The track also reached number 1 in Canada and New Zealand, and was a Top 5 hit on many European charts as well as in countries including Australia and South Africa. The B-side was "Susie and Jeffrey", which appeared as a bonus track on the original 1980 cassette edition of the Autoamerican album, and was also included on EMI-Capitol's re-issue of Autoamerican in 2001.

Billboard said that "The instrumental break is catchy while the track sways to a lyrical beat." Record World called it a "surprising and pleasing reggae track."

=== Versions ===
Official remixes of the Blondie version have been issued twice; first by Coldcut in 1988 on the Blondie/Debbie Harry remix compilation Once More into the Bleach, and the second time in 1995 by Pete Arden and Vinny Vero on the album Remixed Remade Remodeled: The Remix Project (UK edition: Beautiful: The Remix Album).

Blondie re-recorded the song for the 2014 compilation album Greatest Hits Deluxe Redux. The compilation was part of a two-disc set called Blondie 4(0) Ever, which included their album Ghosts of Download and marked the 40th anniversary of the band's formation.

=== Accolades ===
Year	Publisher	Country	Accolade	Rank
1981	Dave Marsh & James Bernard	United States	Singles of the Year 1980	21
2003	Giannis Petridis	Greece	2004 of the Best Songs of the Century	*
2003	NME	United Kingdom	117 Songs to Soundtrack Your Summer	*
2003	Paul Morley	United Kingdom	Greatest Pop Single of All Time	*
2005	Bruce Pollock	United States	The 7,500 Most Important Songs of 1944–2000	*
2005	Toby Creswell	Australia	1001 Songs	*

(*) indicates the list is unordered.

=== Track listings ===
7-inch

1. "The Tide Is High" (7-inch edit) – 3:54
2. "Suzy & Jeffrey" – 4:09

US 7-inch (Chrysalis Classics Re-Issue)

1. "The Tide Is High" (7-inch edit) – 3:54
2. "Rapture" – 4:59

US 7-inch (Collectables Record Corp. COL 6115)

1. "The Tide Is High"
2. "Heart of Glass"

=== Charts ===
==== Weekly charts ====
Chart (1980–1981)	Peak position
Australia (Kent Music Report)	4
Austria (Ö3 Austria Top 40)	6
Belgium (Ultratop 50 Flanders)	4
Canada Top Singles (RPM)	1
Finland (Suomen virallinen lista)	19
Ireland (IRMA)	2
Luxembourg (Radio Luxembourg)	1
Netherlands (Dutch Top 40)	4
Netherlands (Single Top 100)	5
New Zealand (Recorded Music NZ)	1
Norway (VG-lista)	7
South Africa (Springbok Radio)	5
Sweden (Sverigetopplistan)	19
Switzerland (Schweizer Hitparade)	5
UK Singles (Official Charts)	1
US Billboard Adult Contemporary	3
US Billboard Hot 100	1
US Billboard Hot Dance Club Play	1
US Cash Box	1
US Record World	1
West Germany (GfK)	15

==== Year-end charts ====
Chart (1980)	Rank
Netherlands (Dutch Top 40)	59
Netherlands (Single Top 100)	65

Chart (1981)	Rank
Australia (Kent Music Report)	48
Canada Top Singles (RPM)	10
New Zealand (RIANZ)	14
US Billboard Hot 100	17
US Cash Box	20

=== Certifications ===
Region	Certification	Certified units/sales
Canada (Music Canada)	Platinum	150,000^{^}
New Zealand (RMNZ)	Platinum	30,000^{‡}
United Kingdom (BPI)	Gold	500,000^{^}
United States (RIAA)	Gold	1,000,000^{^}
^{^} Shipments figures based on certification alone.^{‡} Sales+streaming figures based on certification alone.

== Papa Dee version ==
"The Tide Is High"

Single by Papa Dee

from the album The Journey
- Released: 1996
- Length: 3:55
- Label: WEA
- Songwriter: John Holt

Papa Dee singles chronology
"The Journey" (1996)	"The Tide Is High" (1996)	"Feeding You Lies" (1996)

In 1996, Papa Dee covered the song on his album The Journey. It was released on both CD single and CD maxi formats.

=== Track listings ===
CD single

1. "The Tide Is High (On The Beach – Original Version)" – 3:43
2. "The Tide Is High (Radio Version 1996)" – 3:40

CD maxi

1. "The Tide Is High (On The Beach – Original Version)" – 3:43
2. "The Tide Is High (5 Gramme Remix)" – 5:17
3. "The Tide Is High (Extended Version)" – 5:51
4. "Great Money Spender"" – 4:08

=== Charts ===
Charts (1996)	Peak position
Finland (Suomen virallinen lista)	20
Sweden (Sverigetopplistan)	44

== Atomic Kitten version ==
"The Tide Is High (Get the Feeling)"

Single by Atomic Kitten

from the album Feels So Good
- B-side: "Album Medley"; "Dancing in the Street"
- Released: 26 August 2002
- Studio: Wise Buddah (London, England)
- Genre: Pop
- Length: 3:26
- Label: Innocent; Virgin
- Songwriters: John Holt; Tyrone Evans; Howard Barrett; Bill Padley; Jem Godfrey
- Producers: Bill Padley; Jem Godfrey

Atomic Kitten singles chronology
"It's OK!" (2002)	"The Tide Is High (Get the Feeling)" (2002)	"The Last Goodbye" / "Be with You" (2002)

Music video
- "The Tide Is High (Get the Feeling)" on YouTube

British girl group Atomic Kitten covered "The Tide Is High" and released it as the second single from their second studio album Feels So Good (2002) on 26 August 2002. Their version of the song also added a new bridge co-written by Howard Barrett, Tyrone Evans and the song's producers Bill Padley and Jem Godfrey, hence the subtitle "Get the Feeling". It was used during the opening credits of The Lizzie McGuire Movie and was also used for a TV commercial featuring Japanese beer company Asahi Breweries. This was the group's third and final UK number one single. This version of "The Tide Is High" was selected by The Daily Telegraph writer David Cheal as one of his "Top five awful cover versions" in 2002, describing it as "a ghastly, sickly confection that has none of the wistfulness or soulfulness of either Blondie's version or the Paragons' original".

The group performed the track for the first time ever with the original line-up for their 2012 reformation for The Big Reunion, with Kerry Katona performing Jenny Frost's vocals.

=== Chart performance ===
Atomic Kitten's version of the song proved successful on the charts, selling over 1.5 million copies worldwide. It spent three weeks at number one in the United Kingdom (selling 145,000 copies in the first week; it was eventually certified Platinum and has sold over 600,000 copies), and is the group's third and final UK number one. The track also topped the charts in Ireland and New Zealand and was a Top 5 hit in many other countries, including Australia, Belgium, Germany, the Netherlands and Turkey amongst others.

=== Music video ===
The music video is Atomic Kitten's most famous due to band member Natasha Hamilton being noticeably pregnant at the time. The video begins with the group walking in front of a flashing rainbow. Whenever the chorus of the song is heard, a dance accompanies it. Hamilton, Liz McClarnon and Jenny Frost choreographed a simplistic dance that they would also perform during live shows. Four men are seen dancing alongside the women with slightly different moves.

Treadmills and green screen technology are used to achieve the effects in the video. A sign that reads "Atomic" can be seen flashing throughout the video (and on clips on the "behind the scenes" version showing one girl dancing and three girls dancing). Each group member has a different set for their solo. McClarnon is next to a silver tree, with a purple background and a repeating pattern of the same tree that she is dancing beside. Frost is next to a car, within a blue background, while Hamilton is seen in a pink-coloured room with "number 1" signs. At the song's bridge, the three women are seen dancing near fluorescent purple lights.

=== Spanish version ===
Atomic Kitten also recorded a Spanish version of the single, titled "Ser tu pasión". It was released in Colombia, Mexico and Spain, but failed to chart. However, the song promoted Atomic Kitten's second studio album Feels So Good in Mexico, and as a result, the album peaked at number 69 on the charts there; it was also included on the Spanish version of Atomic Kitten's The Greatest Hits album in 2004.

=== Track listings ===
UK CD1 (blue)

1. "The Tide Is High (Get the Feeling)" (radio mix) – 3:26
2. "Album Medley" – 5:10
3. "Dancing in the Street" – 3:39
4. "The Tide Is High (Get the Feeling)" (video) – 3:26

UK CD2 (red)

1. "The Tide Is High (Get the Feeling)" (radio mix) – 3:26
2. "The Tide Is High (Get the Feeling)" (Groove Brothers 12-inch remix) – 5:35
3. "The Tide Is High (Get the Feeling)" (Lasgo Remix) – 5:40

UK cassette single

1. "The Tide Is High (Get the Feeling)" (radio mix) – 3:26
2. "Album Medley" – 5:10
3. "The Tide Is High (Get the Feeling)" (Groove Brothers edit) – 3:20

European CD single

1. "The Tide Is High (Get the Feeling)" (radio mix) – 3:26
2. "Album Medley" – 5:10

Australian CD single

1. "The Tide Is High (Get the Feeling)" (radio mix) – 3:26
2. "It's OK!" (Almighty Mix) – 6:32
3. "The Tide Is High (Get the Feeling)" (Groove Brothers edit) – 3:20
4. "The Tide Is High (Get the Feeling)" (Groove Brothers 12-inch) – 5:34
5. "Whole Again" (M*A*S*H Master Mix) – 7:15

=== Credits and personnel ===
Credits are lifted from the Feels So Good album booklet.

Studios

- Recorded and mixed at Wise Buddah Music Studios (London, England)
- Mastered at Sony Music Studios (London, England)

Personnel

- John Holt – writing
- Tyrone Evans – writing
- Howard Barrett – writing
- Bill Padley – writing, all instruments, programming, production, arrangement
- Jem Godfrey – writing, all instruments, programming, production, arrangement
- Carrie Grant – additional vocal production
- John Davis – mastering
- Chris Potter – mastering

=== Charts ===
==== Weekly charts ====
Chart (2002–2003)	Peak position
Australia (ARIA)	4
Austria (Ö3 Austria Top 40)	3
Belgium (Ultratop 50 Flanders)	5
Belgium (Ultratop 50 Wallonia)	33
Croatia International (HRT)	1
Czech Republic (IFPI)	4
Denmark (Tracklisten)	10
Europe (Eurochart Hot 100)	3
France (SNEP)	42
Germany (GfK)	3
Hungary (Rádiós Top 40)	4
Hungary (Single Top 40)	6
Ireland (IRMA)	1
Italy (FIMI)	21
Netherlands (Dutch Top 40)	3
Netherlands (Single Top 100)	2
New Zealand (Recorded Music NZ)	1
Norway (VG-lista)	11
Poland Airplay (Music & Media)	9
Poland (Polish Airplay Charts)	5
Scottish Singles Sales (Official Charts)	1
Sweden (Sverigetopplistan)	5
Switzerland (Schweizer Hitparade)	4
Turkey (Türkiye Top 20)	4
UK Singles (Official Charts)	1
UK Airplay (Music Week)	2

==== Year-end charts ====
Chart (2002)	Position
Australia (ARIA)	16
Austria (Ö3 Austria Top 40)	43
Belgium (Ultratop 50 Flanders)	41
Europe (Eurochart Hot 100)	24
Germany (Media Control)	54
Ireland (IRMA)	15
Netherlands (Dutch Top 40)	6
Netherlands (Single Top 100)	15
New Zealand (RIANZ)	38
Sweden (Hitlistan)	30
Switzerland (Schweizer Hitparade)	61
UK Singles (OCC)	13
UK Airplay (Music Week)	58

Chart (2003)	Position
Australia (ARIA)	38

==== Decade-end charts ====
Chart (2000–2009)	Position
Netherlands (Single Top 100)	85

=== Certifications ===
Region	Certification	Certified units/sales
Australia (ARIA)	Platinum	70,000^{^}
Denmark (IFPI Danmark)	Gold	45,000^{‡}
New Zealand (RMNZ)	2× Platinum	60,000^{‡}
Sweden (GLF)	Gold	15,000^{^}
United Kingdom (BPI)	Platinum	600,000^{‡}
^{^} Shipments figures based on certification alone.^{‡} Sales+streaming figures based on certification alone.

=== Release history ===
Region	Date	Format(s)	Label(s)	Ref.
United Kingdom	26 August 2002	CD; cassette	Innocent; Virgin	
New Zealand	7 October 2002	CD	Innocent; Virgin	
Australia	14 October 2002	CD	Innocent; Virgin	

== Kardinal Offishall version ==
"Numba 1 (Tide Is High)"

Single by Kardinal Offishall featuring Keri Hilson, Rihanna or Nicole Scherzinger

from the album Not 4 Sale
- B-side: "Nina"
- Released: September 2008
- Studio: CMS (Toronto, Ontario); Black Chiney (Miami, Florida); No Excuses (Santa Monica, California)
- Length: 3:42
- Label: Kon Live; Geffen; Black Jays
- Songwriters: Jason Harrow; Dwayne Chin-Quee; John Holt
- Producer: Supa Dups

Kardinal Offishall singles chronology
"Set It Off" (2008)	"Numba 1 (Tide Is High)" (2008)	"Beautiful" (2009)

Keri Hilson singles chronology
"Return the Favor" (2008)	"Numba 1 (Tide Is High)" (2008)	"Turnin' Me On" (2008)

Music video
- "Numba 1 (Tide Is High)" on YouTube

"Numba 1 (Tide Is High)" is a 2008 version of the song, performed by Canadian rapper Kardinal Offishall featuring Keri Hilson. The Canadian single version replaced Hilson with Rihanna and the Latin American single version featured Nicole Scherzinger. Produced by Supa Dups, the song, a percussive, dancehall-infused hip-hop update, was released in September 2008 as the fourth single from Offishall's fourth album Not 4 Sale. It was released on iTunes on 14 October 2008. In March 2010, the single was certified Gold by the CRIA.

=== Music video ===
The music video premiered on 24 October 2008 at Yahoo! Music. It was directed by Gil Green, with Akon making a cameo appearance. The song "Nina" is featured at the end of the video.

=== Track list ===
- Digital download / 12-inch maxi-single
1. "Numba 1 (Tide Is High)" (featuring Keri Hilson) – 3:40
2. "Numba 1 (Tide Is High)" (featuring Keri Hilson) [Moto Blanco Club Mix] – 6:55
- Canadian CD single
1. "Numba 1 (Tide Is High)" (featuring Rihanna) – 3:44
- Latin America CD single
1. "Numba 1 (Tide Is High)" (featuring Nicole Scherzinger) – 3:39
- Remixes
- "Numba 1 (Tide Is High) (Dutty South Remix)" (featuring David Banner, Alfamega, Lindo P, Darryl Riley and Yummy Bingham)
- "Numba 1 (Tide Is High) (Dutty Remix)" (featuring Barrington Levy, Busta Rhymes, Lindo P, Darryl Riley, and Yummy Bingham)

=== Charts ===
Chart (2008–2009)	Peak position
Canada Hot 100 (Billboard)	38
Canada (Hot Canadian Digital Singles)^{1}	32
Germany (Deutsche Black Charts)	1
Israel (Airplay Chart)	7
Turkey (Türkiye Top 20)	4
UK Singles (Official Charts)	84

=== Certifications ===
Region	Certification	Certified units/sales
Canada (Music Canada)	Gold	5,000^{^}
^{^} Shipments figures based on certification alone.

== See also ==
- List of Billboard Hot 100 number-one singles of 1981
- List of Cash Box Top 100 number-one singles of 1981
- List of number-one dance singles of 1981 (U.S.)
- List of number-one singles of 1981 (Canada)
- List of number-one singles from the 1980s (New Zealand)
- List of UK Singles Chart number ones of the 1980s
- List of number-one singles of 2002 (Ireland)
- List of number-one singles from the 2000s (New Zealand)
- List of UK Singles Chart number ones of the 2000s
