= Don't Bring Me Down =

- Artwork for UK, Australian, and some other European vinyl releases

Single by Electric Light Orchestra

from the album Discovery
- B-side: "Dreaming of 4000"
- Released: July 1979 (US); 24 August 1979 (UK)
- Genre: Pop rock; symphonic rock; electronic rock; disco
- Length: 4:02
- Label: Jet
- Songwriter: Jeff Lynne
- Producer: Jeff Lynne

Electric Light Orchestra singles chronology
"The Diary of Horace Wimp" (1979)	"Don't Bring Me Down" (1979)	"Confusion / Last Train to London" (1979)

Discovery track listing
- 9 tracks Side one: 1. "Shine a Little Love"; 2. "Confusion"; 3. "Need Her Love"; 4. "The Diary of Horace Wimp"; Side two: 5. "Last Train to London"; 6. "Midnight Blue"; 7. "On the Run"; 8. "Wishing"; 9. "Don't Bring Me Down"

Music video
- "Don't Bring Me Down" on YouTube

"Don't Bring Me Down" is the ninth and final track on the English rock band the Electric Light Orchestra's 1979 album Discovery. It is their highest-charting hit in the United States.

== History ==
It's a great big galloping ball of distortion. I wrote it at the last minute, 'cause I felt there weren't enough loud ones on the album. This was just what I was after.

— Discovery remaster (2001), Jeff Lynne

"Don't Bring Me Down" is the band's second-highest-charting hit in the UK, where it peaked at number 3, and their biggest hit in the United States, peaking at number 4 on the Billboard Hot 100. It also charted well in Canada (number 1) and Australia (number 6). This was the first single by ELO not to include a string section. Engineer Reinhold Mack claims that this was his idea, after Lynne did not know what they should record next, and that he encouraged Lynne to "just boogie out for a night."

The drum track is in fact a tape loop, coming from "On the Run" looped and slowed down and then sped up; Mack recalls that Bevan was not interested in joining in the jam session that helped create the song; Mack decided to use a drum loop, and Lynne asked Mack to change the speed of the loop tape. After developing the drum tape loop, Lynne composed the music on a piano and then developed the lyrics about a girl who thought herself better than her boyfriend. The instruments do not include strings. Lynne said "This was the first song I did without any strings. It was exciting to work with them when we started, but [after] six albums, I got fed up with them. There was also trouble with the unions. They’d stop playing before the end of the song if the end of the hour was approaching. Now they aren’t so rude since there are samplers and everything."

The song ends with the sound of a door slamming. According to producer Jeff Lynne, this was a metal fire door at Musicland Studios where the song was recorded.

The song was dedicated to the NASA Skylab space station, which re-entered the Earth's atmosphere and burned up over the Indian Ocean and Western Australia on 11 July 1979.

On 4 November 2007, Lynne was awarded a BMI (Broadcast Music, Inc) Million-Air certificate for "Don't Bring Me Down" for the song having reached two million airplays.

== Misheard lyric ==
"Don't Bring Me Down" (1979) by ELO
Use of made-up "grooss", often misheard as "Bruce"

A common mondegreen in the song is the perception that, following the title line, Lynne shouts "Bruce!" In the liner notes of the ELO compilation Flashback and elsewhere, Lynne has explained that he is singing a made-up word, "Groos", which some have suggested sounds like the German expression "Gruß", meaning "greeting." Lynne has explained that originally he did not realize the meaning of the syllable, and he just used it as a temporary placekeeper to fill a gap in the lyrics, but upon learning the German meaning he decided to leave it in. After the song's release, so many people had misinterpreted the word as "Bruce" that Lynne actually began to sing the word as "Bruce" for fun at live shows.

ELO engineer Reinhold Mack remembers the genesis of the term differently, stating that Lynne was actually singing "Bruce" as a joke in advance of an Australian tour "referring to how many Australian guys are called Bruce." Mack stated that this was a temporary line, as "[they] couldn't leave it like that, so eventually we replaced it with 'Gruss,' based on the Bavarian greeting 'Grüß Gott," – 'greet God.' Gruss, not Bruce, is what you hear in the song immediately following the title line."

== Critical reception ==
AllMusic's Donald Guarisco retrospectively praised ELO for not including a string section in the song: "Electric Light Orchestra can easily be summed up as 'pop music with strings'. Thus, it is pretty ironic that the group's biggest American hit, 'Don't Bring Me Down', features no string section at all", adding that "it proved that Electric Light Orchestra could be just as interesting without the string section and thus paved the way for later string-less [sic] hits like 'Hold On Tight' and 'Calling America', concluding that it was a song that was "powerful enough for rock fans but dance-friendly enough for the disco set".

Billboard found the song to be Beatlesque while praising the multiple "irresistible" instrumental and vocal hooks. Cash Box similarly described it as being influenced by the Beatles, particularly the song "You Can't Do That," and said that the song "brims with overdubbed Lynne harmonies and a pounding rhythm track." Record World said that "From the opening drum blasts, through the harmony vocal/percussion break, to the echo-filled closing, this song rocks." Ultimate Classic Rock rated "Don't Bring Me Down" as the 97th greatest classic rock song, saying it "may just be Jeff Lynne's most concise and representative musical statement."

In 2022, Lynne listed it as one of his nine favorite ELO songs.

== Music video ==
A music video was produced, which showed the band performing the song interspersed with various animations relating to the song's subject matter, including big-bottomed majorettes and a pulsating neon frankfurter. The band's three resident string players are depicted playing keyboards.

== Jeff Lynne version ==
Jeff Lynne re-recorded the song in his own home studio. It was released on a compilation album with other re-recorded ELO songs called Mr. Blue Sky: The Very Best of Electric Light Orchestra.

== Personnel ==
Partial credits from JeffLynneSongs.com and engineer Reinhold Mack.

- Jeff Lynne – lead vocals, harmony and backing vocals, electric lead guitar, 12-string acoustic guitar, additional guitars, piano, synthesizer
- Bev Bevan – drums, percussion
- Richard Tandy – grand piano, synthesizer, electric piano, clavinet
- Kelly Groucutt – harmony and backing vocals, bass

== Cover versions and remixes ==
- In 2012, The Hives released a song called "Go Right Ahead". Though not a direct cover, the main riff in the song is nearly identical to the one in "Don't Bring Me Down", and as a result Jeff Lynne was credited as a co-writer.
- Country stars Little Big Town, Kacey Musgraves and Midland performed the song on The Tonight Show Starring Jimmy Fallon to promote their The Breakers Tour.

== Chart and sales ==
=== Weekly charts ===
Chart (1979)	Peak position
Australia (Kent Music Report)	6
Austria (Ö3 Austria Top 40)	2
Belgium (Ultratop 50 Flanders)	5
Canada Top Singles (RPM)	1
Germany (GfK)	5
Ireland (IRMA)	6
Netherlands (Dutch Top 40)	5
Netherlands (Single Top 100)	5
New Zealand (Recorded Music NZ)	6
South Africa (Springbok Radio)	9
Spain (AFYVE)	10
Switzerland (Schweizer Hitparade)	2
UK Singles (Official Charts)	3
US Billboard Hot 100	4
US Cash Box	4
US Record World	3

=== Year-end charts ===
Chart (1979)	Rank
Australia (Kent Music Report)	34
Belgium (Ultratop 50 Flanders)	57
Canada Top Singles (RPM)	25
Netherlands (Dutch Top 40)	39
Netherlands (Single Top 100)	61
New Zealand (Recorded Music NZ)	50
US Billboard	81
US Cash Box	39

=== Sales and certifications ===
Region	Certification	Certified units/sales
Australia (ARIA)	Gold	50,000^{^}
New Zealand (RMNZ)	2× Platinum	60,000^{‡}
United Kingdom (BPI)	Platinum	600,000^{‡}
United States (RIAA)	2× Platinum	2,000,000^{‡}
^{^} Shipments figures based on certification alone.^{‡} Sales+streaming figures based on certification alone.

== See also ==
- List of number-one singles of 1979 (Canada)
