= Shine a Little Love =

1979 song by the Electric Light Orchestra

Single by Electric Light Orchestra

from the album Discovery
- B-side: "Jungle"
- Released: 11 May 1979
- Studio: Musicland (Munich, Germany)
- Genre: Disco; rock
- Length: 4:41 (album version); 4:08 (single version)
- Label: Jet
- Songwriter: Jeff Lynne
- Producer: Jeff Lynne

Electric Light Orchestra singles chronology
| "The ELO EP" (1978) | "Shine a Little Love" (1979) | "The Diary of Horace Wimp" (1979) |

Discovery track listing
- 9 tracks Side one: 1. "Shine a Little Love"; 2. "Confusion"; 3. "Need Her Love"; 4. "The Diary of Horace Wimp"; Side two: 5. "Last Train to London"; 6. "Midnight Blue"; 7. "On the Run"; 8. "Wishing"; 9. "Don't Bring Me Down"

Music video
- "Shine a Little Love" (from Discovery video album) on YouTube
- "Shine a Little Love" (standalone) on YouTube

"Shine a Little Love" is a song by English rock band Electric Light Orchestra (ELO). It was released as a single in 1979.

== Summary ==
The song is the first track on their 1979 album Discovery. This was one of the band's most commercially successful singles, peaking at No. 4 in Canada, No. 6 in the UK Singles Chart and No. 8 in the US Billboard Hot 100. The song subsequently became one of their biggest worldwide hits as well. The 12" release was also available in white vinyl. Two different promotional videos were filmed for the single, a recording studio version shot on 35mm film, minus the band's three string players and a video-taped version made for the Discovery video album, featuring the full touring line-up.

A bit of a disco beat on this one, and quite a lot of things going on, forty-piece string section and all. It's very jolly and bouncy and I must have been in a very good mood when I wrote it!

— Discovery remaster (2001), Jeff Lynne

== Reception ==
Billboard praised the song's "catchy melody," "intricate musical techniques, special effects and its "tight, cohesive sound." Cash Box said that it has "seamless production, pinpoint harmonies and Jeff Lynne's smooth, mid-range vocals." Record World said that it "mixes progressive rock falsetto harmonies and synthesizer swirls with a thumping bass line."

Something Else! critic S. Victor Aaron said that "it's very disco" with "a mirror ball bass pulse, a galloping guitar, exuberant shouts of 'wooo!'…and of course, string accoutrements" but also has "Beatle-esque pop hooks and craftsmanship."

== Charts ==
=== Weekly charts ===
| Chart (1979) | Peak position |
|---|---|
| Australia (Kent Music Report) | 14 |
| Austria (Ö3 Austria Top 40) | 23 |
| Belgium (Ultratop 50 Flanders) | 21 |
| Canada Adult Contemporary (RPM) | 14 |
| Canada Top Singles (RPM) | 4 |
| Europe (Eurochart Hot 100) | 18 |
| Germany (GfK) | 30 |
| Ireland (IRMA) | 4 |
| Netherlands (Dutch Top 40) | 10 |
| Netherlands (Single Top 100) | 17 |
| New Zealand (Recorded Music NZ) | 17 |
| Norway (VG-lista) | 9 |
| South Africa (Springbok Radio) | 16 |
| Spain (AFE) | 1 |
| UK Singles (Official Charts) | 6 |
| US Billboard Hot 100 | 8 |
| US Billboard Adult Contemporary | 40 |
| US Cash Box | 7 |
| US Record World | 8 |

=== Year-end charts ===
| Chart (1979) | Rank |
|---|---|
| Australia (Kent Music Report) | 97 |
| Canada Top Singles (RPM) | 39 |
| Netherlands (Dutch Top 40) | 89 |
| US Billboard Hot 100 | 71 |
| US Cash Box | 67 |

== Certifications ==
| Region | Certification | Certified units/sales |
|---|---|---|
| United Kingdom (BPI) | Silver | 250,000^{^} |
^{^} Shipments figures based on certification alone.

== B-side ==
"Jungle" is a song written by Jeff Lynne which first appeared as an album track from the 1977 album Out of the Blue. According to the band members' opinions, recording Jungle was a lot of fun owing to the various types of sound effects, the upbeat tune, and the jungle animal noises provided by Lynne, Bev Bevan, and Kelly Groucutt. Like most songs from the LP, the song starts with a fade in sequence by Tandy then continues in a different tune.

On 'Jungle', I was inspired by an old Hollywood movie 42nd Street by Busby Berkeley. I liked the sound of the tap dancers so we re-created this dance in the corridor of Musicland.

— 26 February 2007 – Out of the Blue remaster liner notes, Jeff Lynne

Great fun recording this song with our imitations of bird calls, elephants, Tarzan and even a tap dance sequence performed by Jeff, Kelly and myself.

— 1977 – Japanese Out of the Blue LP liner notes (United Artists GXG 25/26), Bev Bevan

For Jungle, Jeff, Richard, Kelly and Bev provided their own effects and ably imitated the sound of animals, Tarzan and a dubiously named dance troupe in full swing.

— 26 February 2007 – Out of the Blue remaster liner notes, Rob Caiger

== The Lovefreekz version ==
"Shine"

Single by the Lovefreekz
- Released: 24 January 2005
- Length: 3:11
- Label: Positiva
- Songwriter: Jeff Lynne
- Producer: Hal Ritson

English electronic music producer Mark Hadfield, under the alias of the Lovefreekz, sampled the chorus lyric for his version of the song, "Shine". This version was a commercial success in the United Kingdom, debuting and peaking at No. 6 on the UK Singles Chart in January 2005, matching the peak of the original version. It additionally charted within the top 50 in Australia, Flanders, and Ireland. In the United States, it reached No. 22 on the Billboard Dance Radio Airplay chart.

=== Charts ===
==== Weekly charts ====
| Chart (2005) | Peak position |
|---|---|
| Australia (ARIA) | 45 |
| Australia Club Chart (ARIA) | 2 |
| Belgium (Ultratop 50 Flanders) | 32 |
| Ireland (IRMA) | 16 |
| Romania (Romanian Top 100) | 73 |
| Scottish Singles Sales (Official Charts) | 10 |
| UK Dance (Official Charts) | 3 |
| UK Singles (Official Charts) | 6 |
| US Dance Radio Airplay (Billboard) | 22 |

==== Year-end charts ====
| Chart (2005) | Rank |
|---|---|
| Australia Club Chart (ARIA) | 48 |

=== Release history ===
| Region | Date | Format(s) | Label(s) | Ref. |
|---|---|---|---|---|
| United Kingdom | 24 January 2005 | 12-inch vinyl; CD | Positiva | |
| Australia | 14 February 2005 | CD | Sony Music Australia | |
