= The Paragons =

Jamaican ska and rocksteady group

The Paragons were a ska and rocksteady vocal group from Kingston, Jamaica, initially active in the 1960s. Their most famous track was "The Tide Is High", written by band member John Holt.

== Career ==
The Paragons were originally Garth "Tyrone" Evans, songwriter Bob Andy, Junior Menz, and Leroy Stamp. In 1964 Stamp was replaced by singer and songwriter John Holt, and Howard Barrett replaced Menz.

The early Paragons' sound used the vocal harmonies of Jamaican groups of the early 1960s. Beginning in 1964, they recorded on the Treasure Isle record label with record producer Duke Reid, songs such as "Memories by the Score", "On the Beach", "Only a Smile" and "Wear You to the Ball", which were later covered by UB40, Horace Andy, Dennis Brown, Massive Attack, and others. Other recordings included "Man Next Door" aka "Quiet Place"/"I've Got to Get Away" (1968) and "Happy Go Lucky Girl".

The Paragons' recordings, including the widely covered "The Tide Is High" from 1967, written by Holt, and featuring the violin of "White Rum" Raymond, are among the highlights of Jamaican popular music. "The Tide Is High" was taken to the top of the UK and US charts by Blondie in 1980; while Atomic Kitten's cover version also topped the UK Singles Chart in 2002.

Holt left to pursue a successful solo career in 1970. Following Holt's departure, the group recorded briefly with female vocalist Roslyn Sweat as Roslyn Sweat & The Paragons and The Paragons (featuring Roslyn Sweat). Evans too, recording as Tyrone Evans and as Don Evans, enjoyed an albeit less notable solo career, making several recordings while with The Paragons and after the group disbanded.

The group reformed in the late 1970s and released further albums in the late 1970s and early 1980s.

Evans died in 2000, and Holt in October 2014. Andy died in 2020.

== Discography ==
=== Studio albums ===
- On the Beach (1967)
- With Roslyn Sweat (1974)
- The Paragons (1981)
- Now (1981)
- Positive Movements (1982)
- Heaven & Earth (1996)
- The Paragons Sing the Beatles and Bob Dylan (1998)
- The Legendary Paragons (2000)
- Yellowman Meets the Paragons (2002)
- The Paragons Return

Contributing artist

- The Rough Guide to Reggae (1997, World Music Network)

== See also ==
- Crab Records
- Jet Set Records
- Island Records discography
- List of ska musicians
- List of reggae musicians
