= The Last Goodbye (Atomic Kitten song) =

2002 single by Atomic Kitten

Single by Atomic Kitten

from the album Feels So Good
- A-side: "Be with You"
- B-side: "For Once in My Life"
- Released: 25 November 2002
- Studio: Metropolis (London, England)
- Length: 3:07
- Label: Innocent; Virgin
- Songwriters: Espen Lind; Mikkel Storleer Eriksen; Tor Erik Hermansen; Hallgeir Rustan; Peter Björklund; Daniel Poku
- Producer: StarGate

Atomic Kitten singles chronology
"The Tide Is High (Get the Feeling)" (2002)	"The Last Goodbye" / "Be with You" (2002)	"Love Doesn't Have to Hurt" (2003)

Audio video
- "The Last Goodbye" on YouTube

"The Last Goodbye" is a song by British girl group Atomic Kitten. It was written by Daniel Poku, Espen Lind, Mikkel Storleer Eriksen, Tor Erik Hermansen, Hallgeir Rustan, and Peter Björklund and recorded by the band for their second album, Feels So Good (2002), while production of the song was overseen by Rustan, Eriksen and Hermansen under their under their production moniker Stargate. "The Last Goodbye" is built upon a flute motif and an acoustic guitar loop. Lyrically, the break-up song finds the trio thinking deeply over a relationship with their love interests from whom they parted.

The song was released as the third single from the album in November 2002 and became a top-20 hit in Austria, Denmark, the Netherlands, New Zealand, Portugal, Turkey, and the Wallonian region of Belgium. In Ireland and the United Kingdom, "The Last Goodbye" was released as a double A-single with the previously unreleased song "Be with You" and peaked at numbers five and two on the Irish and UK Singles Charts, respectively. An accompanying music video was directed by Jake Nava and filmed in Liverpool in October 2002. To further promote "The Last Goodbye", Atomic Kitten also recorded a Spanish version for the song, titled "Algun dia de adios".

== Background ==
"The Last Goodbye" was written by Norwegian musicians Hallgeir Rustan, Mikkel Storleer Eriksen and Tor Erik Hermansen, a trio of Norwegian musicians who work under the production moniker Stargate, along with frequent collaborators Espen Lind and Peter Björklund and British DJ Daniel "D Mob" Poku: It is one out of two tracks Stargate contributed to parent album Feels So Good (2002), the other being lead single "It's OK!". Recording took place at the Metropolis Studios in London, while mixing was helmed at the StarGate Studios in Norway. Bernt Rune Stray played the guitar.

Described by band member Liz McClarnon as a "sort of a slow ballad but still quite funky," "The Last Goodbye" was re-recorded for its single release to include solo parts of each Atomic Kitten member. While the original version features Natasha Hamilton on lead vocals on both the first and second verses, portions of her vocals were replaced on the single version, with McClarnon and Hamilton splitting the first verse and Jenny Frost and Hamilton sharing the second verse.

== Chart performance ==
In Ireland and the United Kingdom, Virgin Records released "The Last Goodbye" on a double A-single along with the previously unreleased song "Be with You". Both songs served as the album's third and fourth single, respectively. In the United Kingdom, it became the band's eighth top ten hit, peaking at number two on the UK Singles Chart in its first week of release. It stayed on the chart for 12 weeks, and managed to sell 182,695 copies in the UK alone. In 2012, the Official Charts Company named "The Last Goodbye"/"Be with You" the group's fifth best-selling single after "Whole Again", "The Tide Is High (Get the Feeling)", "Eternal Flame" and "It's OK!."

The single also became Atomic Kitten's third top five hit in Ireland, where it peaked at number five on the Irish Singles Chart. Elsewhere released as a standalone single, "The Last Goodbye" reached the top forty on the majority of the charts it appeared on. It became a top 20 hit in Austria, Denmark, the Netherlands, New Zealand, Portugal, Turkey, and the Wallonian region of Belgium. In Germany and Switzerland, the song was a top 30 hit, and in the Flemish region of Belgium and Sweden, it was a top 40 hit.

== Music video ==
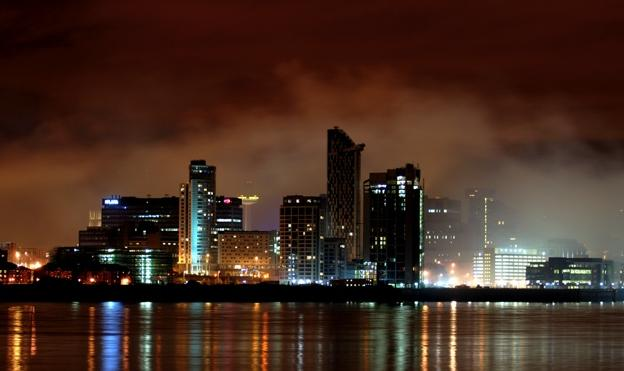
The music video for "The Last Goodbye" was filmed in various locations throughout Liverpool.

For the music video for "The Last Goodbye" Atomic Kitten re-teamed with British director Jake Nava with whom they had previously worked on the visuals for "It's OK!" and "The Tide Is High (Get the Feeling)". The majority of the video filmed on 16 October 2002 and set in night-time Liverpool. According to band member Natasha Hamilton, the reason the video was filmed in Liverpool, was "because [they] wanted a location with beautiful architecture, and tourist attractions that people will instantly associate with Liverpool."

In the music video, the band members portray three women in differing scenes, who stumble upon various lovestruck couples, whilst they themselves are alone. Liz McClarnon said that it was their first video where they had to include acting, instead of dancing, posing and just singing in front of the camera. Some of the scenes include McClarnon at the Plaza Community Cinema and Jenny Frost in a hotel room, looking out on the balcony. Scenes of Hamilton at the Liverpool Airport were filmed in front of a greenscreen. The final scene includes all three characters walking down a famous sight in Liverpool, again, in the dead of night.

== Track listings ==
=== Double A-side release ===
"The Last Goodbye" / "Be with You" – UK CD1
No.	Title	Length
1.	"The Last Goodbye"	3:07
2.	"Be with You" (radio edit)	3:38
3.	"Be with You" (Milky 7-inch edit)	3:34
4.	"The Last Goodbye" (video)	3:07

"Be with You" / "The Last Goodbye" – UK CD2
No.	Title	Length
1.	"Be with You" (radio version)	3:38
2.	"The Last Goodbye"	3:07
3.	"For Once in My Life"	3:48
4.	"Be with You" (video)	3:38

"The Last Goodbye" / "Be with You" – UK cassette single
No.	Title	Length
1.	"The Last Goodbye"	3:07
2.	"Be with You" (radio version)	3:38
3.	"Be with You" (extended version)	4:35

=== Solo release ===
European and Australian CD single
No.	Title	Length
1.	"The Last Goodbye"	3:07
2.	"The Last Goodbye" (Soda Club mix)	6:27
3.	"For Once in My Life"	3:48

Dutch CD single
No.	Title	Length
1.	"The Last Goodbye"	3:07
2.	"For Once in My Life"	3:48

== Credits and personnel ==
Credits adapted from the liner notes of Feels So Good.

- Peter Björklund – writing
- John Davis – mastering
- Mikkel Storleer Eriksen – production, writing
- Jenny Frost – vocals
- Natasha Hamilton – vocals
- Tor Erik Hermansen – production, writing
- Liz McClarnon – vocals
- Daniel Poku – writing
- Chris Potter – mastering
- Hallgeir Rustan – production, writing
- Bernt Rune Stray – guitar

== Charts ==
=== Weekly charts ===
Chart (2002–2003)	Peak position
Austria (Ö3 Austria Top 40)	13
Belgium (Ultratop 50 Flanders)	33
Belgium (Ultratip Bubbling Under Wallonia)	11
Czech Republic (IFPI)	1
Denmark (Tracklisten)	20
Europe (Eurochart Hot 100)	13
Germany (GfK)	28
Hungary (Editors' Choice Top 40)	35
Ireland (IRMA) "The Last Goodbye" / "Be with You"	5
Netherlands (Dutch Top 40)	13
Netherlands (Single Top 100)	17
New Zealand (Recorded Music NZ)	11
Portugal (AFP)	9
Romania (Romanian Top 100)	23
Scotland Singles (Official Charts) "The Last Goodbye" / "Be with You"	2
Sweden (Sverigetopplistan)	36
Switzerland (Schweizer Hitparade)	28
Turkey (Türkiye Top 100)	14
UK Singles (Official Charts) "The Last Goodbye" / "Be with You"	2
UK Airplay (Music Week)	9

=== Year-end charts ===
Chart (2002)	Position
Ireland (IRMA)	66
UK Singles (OCC)	88
