= Discovery (Electric Light Orchestra album) =

Studio album by Electric Light Orchestra
- Released: 1 June 1979
- Recorded: March–April 1979
- Studios: Musicland (Munich, Germany)
- Genres: Pop rock; progressive pop; disco
- Length: 38:53
- Labels: Jet; Columbia
- Producer: Jeff Lynne

Electric Light Orchestra chronology
The Light Shines On Vol 2 (1979)	Discovery (1979)	ELO's Greatest Hits (1979)

Singles from Discovery
- 1. "Shine a Little Love" Released: 11 May 1979; 2. "The Diary of Horace Wimp" Released: 21 July 1979; 3. "Don't Bring Me Down" Released: 24 August 1979 (UK); 4. "Confusion" Released: 8 October 1979 (US); 5. "Last Train to London" Released: 9 November 1979

Professional ratings
Review scores
Source	Rating
AllMusic	3/5 stars
The Encyclopedia of Popular Music	3/5 stars
MusicHound Rock	2.5/5 stars
The Rolling Stone Album Guide	2.5/5 stars
Smash Hits	8/10

Discovery is the eighth studio album by English rock band Electric Light Orchestra (ELO). It was released on 1 June 1979 in the United Kingdom by Jet Records, where it topped record charts, and on 8 June in the United States on Jet through Columbia Records distribution. A music video album featuring all the songs being played by the band was then released on VHS in 1979, then re-released as part of the Out of the Blue: Live at Wembley DVD and VHS in 1998.

== Background ==
Discovery was the band's first number 1 album in the UK, entering the chart at that position and staying there for five weeks. The album contained five hit songs in "Shine a Little Love", "Don't Bring Me Down", "Last Train to London", "Confusion" and "The Diary of Horace Wimp", many of which were heavily influenced by disco (in fact, Richard Tandy nicknamed the album, Disco Very). "Don't Bring Me Down" would become one of their only two top three hits in the UK throughout their career ("Xanadu" would be number one in 1980), and also their highest-charting US single at number 4. "The Diary of Horace Wimp" was also a hit single in the UK, not patterned after the disco sound; instead it was closer in its Beatlesque style to the band's earlier hit "Mr. Blue Sky". The album itself was the first ever to generate four top-ten singles (one of which was a Double A-side) from a single LP in the UK and was eventually certified 2× platinum by the RIAA in 1997.

In one of his earliest jobs, comedian/actor Brad Garrett, dressed in Middle Eastern clothes and turban, appears on the back cover as the palace guard who is drawing his scimitar.

Discovery was remastered as part of the Epic/Legacy remaster series in 2001; among the included bonus tracks was a cover of a Del Shannon classic, "Little Town Flirt", which was started during sessions for the album but never finished until the year the album was reissued.

== Critical reception ==
Ken Paulson of the Gannett News Service claimed, "Just when ELO seems to have explored every gimmick, Lynne comes up with a slightly different rhythm and irresistible riff. Discovery unveils nine new songs in that tradition...Discovery is commercial creativity at its best."

== Track listing ==
All tracks written by Jeff Lynne, except "Little Town Flirt" written by Maron McKenzie and Del Shannon.

Side one
No.	Title	Length
1.	"Shine a Little Love"	4:43
2.	"Confusion"	3:42
3.	"Need Her Love"	5:11
4.	"The Diary of Horace Wimp"	4:17

Side two
No.	Title	Length
5.	"Last Train to London"	4:32
6.	"Midnight Blue"	4:19
7.	"On the Run"	3:55
8.	"Wishing"	4:13
9.	"Don't Bring Me Down"	4:02
Total length:		38:53

2001 edition bonus tracks
No.	Title	Length
10.	"On the Run" (home demo)	1:01
11.	"Second Time Around" (home demo)	0:43
12.	"Little Town Flirt"	2:53

Notes

- Bonus tracks were previously unreleased. Track 12 was started 1979, finished 2001. Engineered by Mack and Ryan Ulyate.
- Vinyl mastered by Stan "The Man" Ricker.

== Personnel ==
- Jeff Lynne – lead and backing vocals, lead and rhythm guitar, piano, synthesizer, orchestral & choral arrangements, producer
- Bev Bevan – drums, percussion
- Richard Tandy – grand piano, electric piano, synthesizers, clavinet, orchestral & choral arrangements
- Kelly Groucutt – bass guitar, vocals, backing vocals
- Mik Kaminski – violin (uncredited)
- Hugh McDowell, Melvyn Gale – cello (uncredited)

Additional personnel

- Louis Clark - orchestral & choral arrangements, orchestra conductor
- Mack - engineer

Additional music video personnel

- Mik Kaminski – violin
- Hugh McDowell – cello
- Melvyn Gale – cello

== Charts ==
=== Weekly charts ===
Chart (1979–1980)	Peak position
Argentinian Albums Chart	1
Australian Albums (Kent Music Report)	1
Austrian Albums (Ö3 Austria)	3
Canada Top Albums/CDs (RPM)	3
Dutch Albums (Album Top 100)	6
Finnish Albums (The Official Finnish Charts)	2
German Albums (Offizielle Top 100)	7
Japanese Albums (Oricon)	31
New Zealand Albums (RMNZ)	2
Norwegian Albums (VG-lista)	1
Spanish Albums (AFYVE)	1
Swedish Albums (Sverigetopplistan)	2
UK Albums (Official Charts)	1
US Billboard 200	5

=== Year-end charts ===
Chart (1979)	Peak position
Australian Albums (Kent Music Report)	2
Austrian Albums (Ö3 Austria)	6
Canada Top Albums/CDs (RPM)	5
New Zealand Albums (RMNZ)	7
UK Albums (OCC)	2
US Billboard Year-End	74

Chart (1980)	Peak position
Australian Albums (Kent Music Report)	48
UK Albums (OCC)	89

== Certifications and sales ==
Region	Certification	Certified units/sales
Argentina (CAPIF)	2× Platinum	120,000^{^}
Australia (ARIA)	4× Platinum	200,000^{^}
Canada (Music Canada)	3× Platinum	300,000^{^}
France (SNEP)	Gold	100,000^{*}
Germany (BVMI)	Gold	250,000^{^}
Hong Kong (IFPI Hong Kong)	Gold	10,000^{*}
Netherlands (NVPI)	Gold	50,000^{^}
New Zealand (RMNZ)	Platinum	15,000^{^}
Sweden	—	100,000
United Kingdom (BPI)	Platinum	300,000^{^}
United States (RIAA)	2× Platinum	2,000,000^{^}
^{*} Sales figures based on certification alone.^{^} Shipments figures based on certification alone.

== Bibliography ==
- The Electric Light Orchestra Story (1980) ISBN 0-907394-00-0
