= Martin Harrington =

British musician

- Origin: United Kingdom
- Occupations: Songwriter, record producer and music publisher

Martin Harrington is a British songwriter, record producer and music publisher. He has written songs for artists including Emma Bunton, Five, Celine Dion, Natalie Imbruglia and Blue. The song "Love at First Sight" by Kylie Minogue, of which he was one of the co-writers, was nominated for both Grammy and Ivor Novello awards and was the most played song on UK radio in 2002. The song "Shiver" by Natalie Imbruglia, of which he was one of the co-producers, was the most played song on UK radio in 2005.

== Ed Sheeran lawsuit ==
In June 2016, Harrington and Thomas Leonard filed a $20 million lawsuit against Ed Sheeran, alleging that his song "Photograph" copied elements from their 2009 composition "Amazing," performed by Matt Cardle. The case was settled in 2017 under undisclosed terms.

== Discography ==
- What Took You So Long? - Emma Bunton (2001)
- Everybody - Hear'Say (2001)
- Love at First Sight - Kylie Minogue (2002)
- Come On Over - Kym Marsh (2003)
- If You Come to Me - Atomic Kitten (2003)
- Don't Look Back - Thalía (2004)
- Mad World / If You Come to Me (2004)
- Amazing - Matt Cardle (2012)
