= Bill Padley =

Scottish record producer and songwriter

- Born: William Padley; 5 March 1961 (age 65); United Kingdom
- Occupations: Musician; songwriter

Bill Padley (born 5 March 1961) is a Scottish record producer and songwriter.

He, along with Jem Godfrey, won an Ivor Novello Award on 25 May 2006, for the Christmas number 1 record and best selling single of 2005, "That's My Goal", by The X-Factor's Shayne Ward. Shayne Ward's first single, "That's My Goal", was released in the UK on 21 December 2005. After selling 742,000 copies in the first week (including 313,000 on its first day), it became the Christmas number one single of 2005, held the top spot for four weeks and stayed in the UK singles chart until June 2006, a 21-week run. It became (at that time) the fourth fastest-selling UK single of all time, beaten only by Elton John's "Candle in the Wind", Will Young's "Anything Is Possible"/"Evergreen", and Gareth Gates' "Unchained Melody" which sold 685,000, 403,000 and 335,000 copies in their first days of sale respectively. To date, "That's My Goal" has sold over 1.3 million copies in the UK.

Padley is also credited with three other UK and international No. 1 hit singles in the UK singles chart, including Atomic Kitten's "Whole Again" (alongside Jem Godfrey, and OMD's Andy McCluskey and Stuart Kershaw) which earned him a further two Ivor Novello Award nominations in 2002 and is the biggest selling song of the 21st century in the UK by a girl band.

He also produced and added additional melody and lyrics to the number one UK single "The Tide Is High (Get the Feeling)" for Atomic Kitten.

Padley was the producer and remixer of the international hit version of "Kiss Kiss" by Holly Valance.

He also had a long and successful career as a radio presenter, notably with Radio Victory, Radio Clyde, BBC GLR, and Isle of Wight Radio, and currently broadcasts on Talk Radio Europe. Bill Padley returned to Radio Victory on June 21, 2025 with a Saturday afternoon show at 3pm, in which he looks back at the music and memories from his time at Victory.

== Single composer ==
- "Whole Again" – Atomic Kitten
- "The Tide Is High" – Atomic Kitten
- "That's My Goal" – Shayne Ward
- "Bye Bye Boy" – Jennifer Ellison
- "Girl's Mind" – Play
- "I Must Not Chase the Boys" – Play

=== Other compositions ===
- "Best in Me" – Blue
- "If It Takes All Night" – Blue
- "Love R.I.P." – Blue
- "Joy and Pain" – Ronan Keating
- "Absolutely" – Gareth Gates
- "Whole Again" – Play
- "Miracle in Me" – Rik Waller
- "Number 1" – Cherie
- "Where Does It End Now?" – Samantha Mumba
- "Confessions" – Britannia High

== Producer and other credits ==
- Julia Fordham – Julia Fordham (1988, producer and sound engineer)
- Sheryl Crow – Hits and Rarities (2000, Producer)
- Fugees – Greatest Hits (2000, Producer)
- Donna Summer/Westlife – Enough Is Enough (2004, Producer, programming, instrumentation)
- Blue – All Rise (2002, Producer, Writer, programming, instrumentation)
- Ronan Keating – Destination (2002, Arranger, producer, instrumentation)
- Disneymania (2002, Producer)
- Atomic Kitten – Feels So Good (2002, Arranger, programming, producer, instrumentation)
- Holly Valance – Footprints (2002, Arranger, programming, multi instruments, producer, mixing)
- Various Artists – Now Dance 2003 (2002, Producer)
- Various Artists – Now, Vol. 53 (2002, Arranger, producer)
- Lulu – Together (2002, Arranger, programming, producer, instrumentation)
- Atomic Kitten – Atomic Kitten (2003, Arranger, keyboards, programming, producer, instrumentation)
- Various Artists – Brit Awards 2003 (2003, Producer)
- Atomic Kitten – Feels So Good (2003, Arranger, programming, producer, instrumentation)
- Gareth Gates – Go Your Own Way (2003, instrumentation)
- Various Artists – Hit 56 (2003, Producer)
- The Lizzie McGuire Movie Original Soundtrack (2003, Producer)
- Various Artists – Now, Vol. 54 (2003, Producer)
- What a Girl Wants Original Soundtrack (2003, Producer, mixing)
- Ronan Keating – 10 Years of Hits (2004, Arranger, programming, producer, instrumentation)
- Blue- Best of Blue (2004, Producer, instrumentation)
- Play – Don't Stop the Music (2004, Producer, instrumentation)
- Gareth Gates – Go Your Own Way (2004, Producer, mixing, instrumentation)
- Atomic Kitten – Greatest Hits (2004, Arranger, keyboards, programming, producer, remixing, instrumentation)
- Lulu – Greatest Hits (2004, Arranger, programming, producer, instrumentation)
- Various Artists – Hip to Hip/Can You Feel It, Pt. 1 (2004, Arranger, multi instruments, producer)
- Various Artists – Hip to Hip/Can You Feel It, Pt. 2 (2004, Producer, instrumentation)
- Various Artists – I Love 2 Party 2004 (2004, Producer)
- Disney's Mega Movie Mix (2004, Producer)
- Cherie – No. 1, Pt. 1 (2004, Producer, instrumentation)
- Cherie – No. 1, Pt. 2 (2004, Producer, instrumentation)
- Jennifer Ellison – Bye Bye Boy (2004, Producer, mixing, musician)
- Blue – 4Ever Blue (2005, Producer, instrumentation)
- Jo O'Meara – Relentless (2005, Producer, writer, instrumentation)
- Atomic Kitten – Access All Areas: Remixed and B-Sides (2005, Arranger, keyboards, programming, producer, remixing, instrumentation)
- Various Artists – Handbag Handbag Handbag: The Soundtrack to the Perfect Girls' Night Out (2005, Producer)
- Shayne Ward – That's My Goal (2005/6, Writer)
