= Jenny Frost =

British singer (b. 1978)

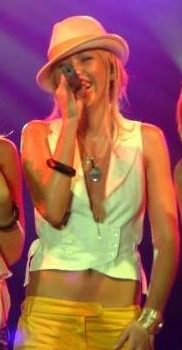
- Frost performing in 2005

Background information
- Born: Jennifer Frost; 22 February 1978 (age 48); Wallasey, Merseyside, England
- Origin: The Wirral, England
- Genre: Pop
- Occupations: Singer; television presenter
- Instrument: Vocals
- Years active: 1998–2012, 2021
- Formerly of: Atomic Kitten; Precious
- Spouse: Vicente Juan Spiteri (m. 2011)
- Partner: Dominic Thrupp (2001–2010)
- Website: jennyfrostofficial.com

Jennifer Frost (born 22 February 1978) is an English singer and television presenter. She was a member of girl groups Precious and Atomic Kitten, replacing Kerry Katona in the latter.

== Biography ==
Frost was born in Wallasey, Merseyside and grew up in Prestwich, near Manchester. She enjoyed music from an early age. Her earliest concert experience was when her father took her to a Level 42 concert at the age of nine. After attending St Monica's High School she started to work for BBC Television on the Holiday programme and travelling around the world.

== Career ==
In 1998, Frost joined the girl group Precious, who were the UK entry at the Eurovision Song Contest 1999, with the song "Say It Again", which reached the top 10 in the UK. Subsequent releases by Precious were less successful, and their debut album failed to chart at all, ultimately leading the group to split in 2000. In 2001, Frost replaced Kerry Katona in Atomic Kitten, a girl group founded by Orchestral Manoeuvres in the Dark frontman Andy McCluskey. With Frost, Liz McClarnon and Natasha Hamilton, Atomic Kitten had three UK number one singles, "Whole Again", "Eternal Flame", and "The Tide Is High (Get the Feeling)". The group also had two UK number one albums, Right Now, and Feels So Good, both being certified double-platinum in the UK for sales of over 600,000 copies each. The total worldwide sales are estimated at 6.2 million singles and 4 million albums.

After the split, Frost signed with Storm Model Management. In 2005, she appeared on the 2005 edition of I'm a Celebrity...Get Me Out of Here! on the ITV network, where she was eliminated on day 14. Frost features on Route 1's single "Crash Landing", released on 10 October 2005, which peaked at number 47.

From 2008 to 2011, Frost presented the successful BBC Three programme Snog Marry Avoid?. Also in 2011 she co-presented OK! TV on Channel 5. In 2012 she presented the talk show The Wright Stuff, her last work before taking a hiatus from her artistic career to prioritize her family.

In 2013 Atomic Kitten were reformed, but Frost declined to rejoin them, and Kerry Katona returned as the third piece.

== Personal life ==
From 2001 to August 2010, Frost dated DJ Dominic Thrupp, whom she had her first child with, born on 9 October 2007. The couple planned to marry in January 2010, but they cancelled following the death of Frost's mother, Rita, from lung cancer. Months later, Frost and Thrupp separated. Frost's father died in September 2017. In August 2011, she married Spanish scuba diver Vicente Juan Spiteri in Ibiza. Their twin daughters were born on 20 January 2013.

== Discography ==
=== Featured singles ===
List of singles as artist, with selected chart positions
Title	Year	Peak chart positions		Album
Title	Year	UK	SCO	Album
"Crash Landing" (Route 1 featuring Jenny Frost)	2005	47	38	Non-album single

=== Other appearances ===
Title	Year	Other artist(s)	Album
"On Me Head Son"	2001	Liz McClarnon	Mike Bassett: England Manager
"Here Kitty Kitty"	2005	Hell Razah	Black Presidents Mixtape Vol. 1

== Filmography ==
=== Television ===
Year	Title	Role	Notes
2005	I'm a Celebrity...Get Me Out of Here!	Contestant	Series 5
2008–2011	Snog Marry Avoid?	Presenter	
2011	OK! TV	Presenter	
2012	The Wright Stuff	Presenter	
