= Jem Godfrey =

British music producer

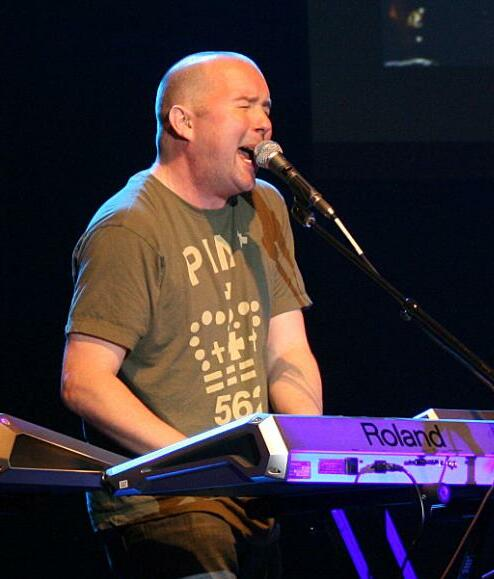
- Godfrey with Frost* at Rosfest-Keswick 2009

Background information
- Born: Jeremy Godfrey
- Genres: Pop; neo-prog; electronic
- Occupations: Producer; musician
- Instruments: Keyboards; vocals; guitar
- Member of: Frost*

Jeremy "Jem" Godfrey (born 6 October 1971) is a British music producer, keyboardist and songwriter.

In the early 1990s he was a producer at BBC Radio 1, before going back to Virgin Radio (where he had had his initial break) to head up the production department. He subsequently worked at Capital Radio before ultimately ending up at Wise Buddhah.

Godfrey was responsible, with Bill Padley at Wisebuddah music, for Atomic Kitten's number one hit "Whole Again", which earned the pair two Ivor Novello Award nominations (shared with the other writers including Andy McCluskey and Stuart Kershaw of Orchestral Manoeuvres in the Dark), and the production and remixing of the international hit version of "Kiss Kiss" by Holly Valance.

He won an Ivor Novello on 25 May 2006 for the best selling single of 2005, "That's My Goal", for The X-Factor's Shayne Ward.

"That's My Goal", was released in the UK on Wednesday, 21 December 2005 and after selling 742,000 copies in the first week (including 313,000 on its first day), it became the Christmas number one single of 2005, held the top spot for four weeks and stayed in the top 75 until June 2006, which was a 21-week run. "That's My Goal" has sold 1,080,000 copies.

In 2004, Godfrey formed the progressive rock group Frost* who have released four studio albums and a live album.

In the autumn of 2010, Godfrey was asked by ex-Frank Zappa guitarist Mike Keneally to play keyboards for Joe Satriani on tour. Godfrey toured for a week with the band before playing the Glasgow and Birmingham shows in the UK while Keneally went to Europe to play piano at Vai-Fest with Steve Vai. In the summer of 2012, Godfrey toured again with Satriani as well as Steve Vai, playing keyboards for the entire European leg of their G3 Tour.

In July 2012, Radio 2 introduced new jingles created by Godfrey, who appeared briefly on the Chris Evans breakfast show to talk about them.

In 2013, Godfrey mixed and co-produced the second album by LOSERS, signed to Gung Ho! Recordings and featuring XFM's Eddy Temple-Morris and Tom Bellamy from The Cooper Temple Clause. The single "Turn Around" was used as the backing music for the trailer for the fourth season of US television series Game of Thrones, while their single "Azan" was used on the trailer for film Hercules. He played keyboards on Matt Stevens of The Fierce and the Dead's solo album Lucid on Cherry Red Records.

In February 2015, Godfrey mixed and co-produced four songs with Gary Barlow for the soundtrack album of the Broadway Musical "Finding Neverland" for Zendaya, Jennifer Lopez and Trey Songz, Nick Jonas and Kiesza. Later that year Godfrey again worked with Barlow on 4 songs for the album "Fly" (inspired by the new Eddie The Eagle film) for Holly Johnson, Taron Egerton, Hugh Jackman, Paul Young, and Tony Hadley.

== Discography ==
=== Single composer ===
- Bye Bye Boy – Jennifer Ellison
- Girl's Mind – Play
- I Must Not Chase the Boys – Play
- (Some words in the song) Tide Is High (Get the Feeling) – Atomic Kitten
- Whole Again – Atomic Kitten
- That's My Goal – Shayne Ward
- "What's Your Name" – Morcheeba

=== Other compositions ===
- Best in Me – Blue
- If It Takes All Night – Blue
- Love R.I.P. – Blue
- Body to Body – Britannia High
- Confessions – Britannia High
- Number 1 – Cherie
- Absolutely – Gareth Gates
- Whole Again – Play
- Miracle in Me – Rik Waller
- Joy and Pain – Ronan Keating
- Where Does It End Now? – Samantha Mumba
- Body to Body – XYP
- Confessions – XYP

=== Producer ===
- Blue – All Rise (2002, Programming, Instrumentation)
- Ronan Keating – Destination (2002, Arranger, Producer, Instrumentation)
- Atomic Kitten – Feels So Good (2002, Arranger, Programming, Producer, Instrumentation)
- Holly Valance – Footprints (2002, Arranger, Programming, Multi Instruments, Producer, Mixing)
- Lulu – Together (2002, Arranger, Programming, Producer, Instrumentation)
- Play – Don't Stop the Music (2004, Producer, Instrumentation)
- Gareth Gates – Go Your Own Way (2004, Producer, Mixing, Instrumentation)
- Cherie – No. 1, Pt. 2 (2004, Producer, Instrumentation)
- Jennifer Ellison – Bye Bye Boy (2004, Producer, Mixing, Musician)
- Frost* – Experiments in Mass Appeal (2008, Keyboards, Vocals, Moose Whispering, Producer)
- Frost* – The Philadelphia Experiment (2009, Keyboards, Vocals)
- Losers – And So We Shall Never Part (2013, Keyboards, Vocals, Production)
