= 2014 FIFA World Cup marketing =

Marketing for the 2014 FIFA World Cup

The marketing of the 2014 FIFA World Cup includes sale of tickets, support from sponsors and promotion through events that utilize the symbols and songs of the tournament.

== Logo ==
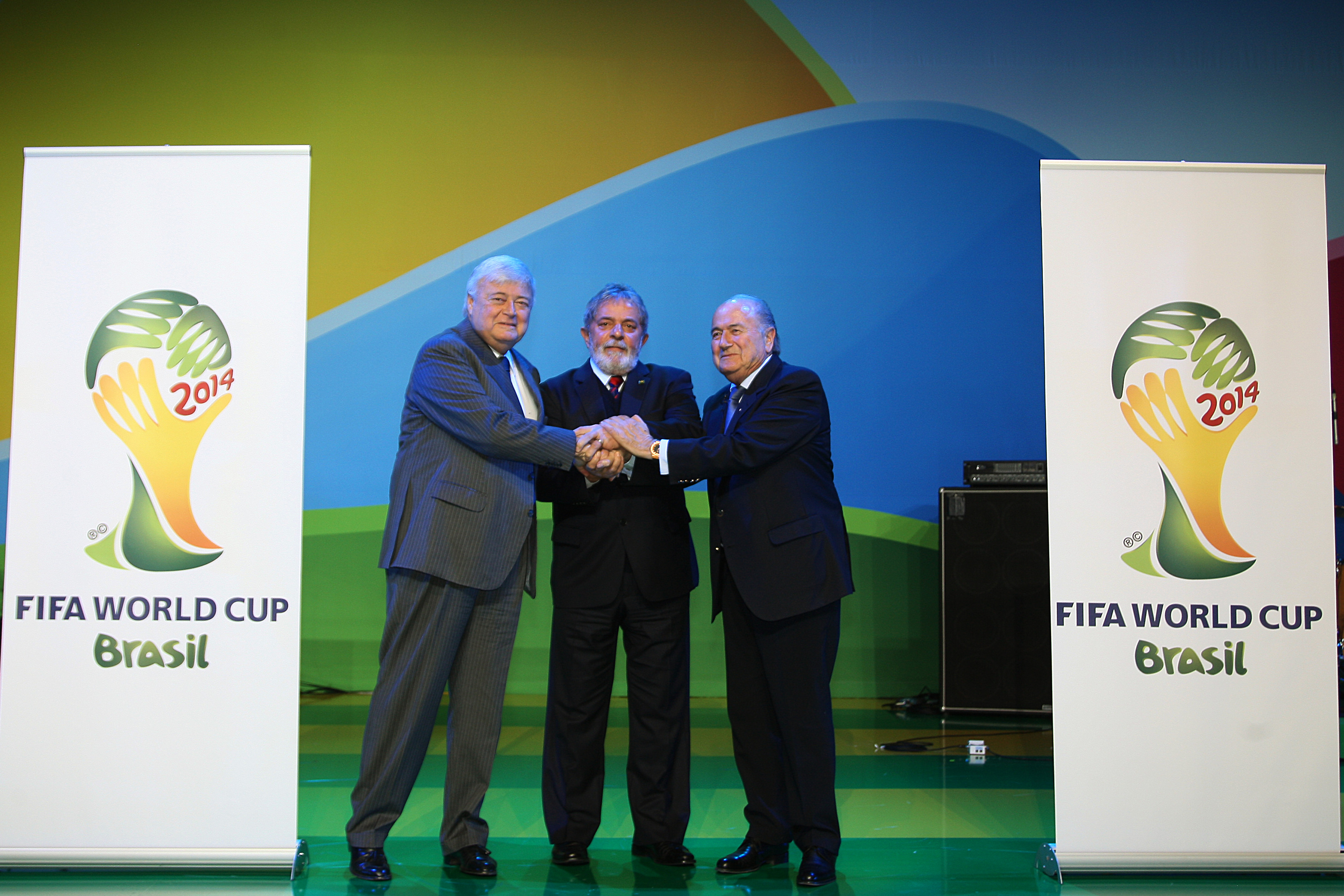
Unveiling of the official Brazil 2014 logo, at Johannesburg in 2010

The official logo of the competition is entitled "Inspiration", and was created by Brazilian agency Africa. The design is based around a photograph of three victorious hands together raising the World Cup trophy and its yellow and green colouring is meant to represent Brazil warmly welcoming the world to their country. It was unveiled at a ceremony held during the 2010 World Cup in Johannesburg. The design was selected from the submissions of 25 Brazilian-based agencies invited to submit designs. Brazilian graphic designer Alexandre Wollner has criticised the design, suggesting that it resembles a facepalm, as well as the process through which it was chosen, which had a jury that excluded professional graphic designers.

== Poster ==
FIFA also commissioned an official poster that was unveiled in January 2013 by World Cup ambassadors Ronaldo, Bebeto, Zagallo, Amarildo, Carlos Alberto Torres and Marta, all of them World Champion footballers, in a ceremony in Rio de Janeiro.

The artwork for this poster, which was created by Karen Haidinger, from Brazilian agency Crama, features a map of the country made up from the outlines of football players' legs kicking a football. In addition, the poster provides detailed drawing depicting the Brazilian culture and other features of the Brazilian nation such as the Brazil's fauna and flora. The official slogan is "All in One Rhythm" (Portuguese: "Juntos num só ritmo").

According to FIFA General Secretary Jérôme Valcke, the poster serves as a strong example of the country’s creativity and capability.

== Mascot ==
The tatu-bola, an armadillo that defends itself from predators by rolling up into a ball, was chosen by FIFA in September 2012 as the official mascot from 47 designs created by six Brazilian agencies.

The then-unnamed mascot was first unveiled to the public during a segment of the Brazilian news show Fantástico. An online public vote was used to determine the name in which three potential names were offered, with the winning name being announced on 25 November 2012: 1.7 million people (about 48%) voted for Fuleco, ahead of Zuzeco (31%) and Amijubi (21%). The name is a portmanteau of the words "Futebol" ("Football") and "Ecologia" ("Ecology").

As well as appearing throughout the tournament, Fuleco also featured on a global promotional tour of the FIFA World Cup Trophy that visited 88 countries between September 2013 and the start of the tournament.

== Merchandising ==
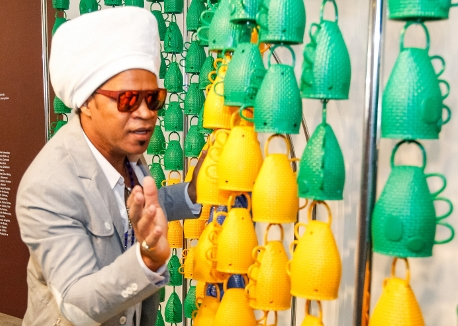
The Caxirola is the official instrument.

Globo Marcas have been appointed the master licensee by FIFA for all retail products related to the 2014 World Cup. A wide range of products have been produced, with the best-selling being those related to the Fuleco mascot as well as the official match ball. The Caxirola, the officially recognised tournament instrument, a percussive instrument created by Brazilian musician Carlinhos Brown, can also be purchased, although its use is banned within stadiums in contrast to the prominent vuvuzela in 2010.

Additional related items include the now customary releases of an official video game (released by EA Sports for the PlayStation 3 and Xbox 360 platforms) and a sticker collection by Panini, which could also be collected in virtual form on FIFA's website.

== Music ==
An official song has been created for every World Cup finals since 1962. In January 2014, FIFA and Sony Music announced that the official song for the tournament will be "We Are One (Ole Ola)" by Pitbull, Jennifer Lopez and Claudia Leitte. A customized version of the song "Dare (La La La)" by Shakira, who provided the official song of the 2010 tournament, will be used as a secondary theme song. Sony also launched a global music contest – entitled 'SuperSong' – to select a song for the competition's official album, One Love, One Rhythm. The contest allowed any person to submit a song via a website, with the winning entrant to be professionally recorded by the singer Ricky Martin. In February 2014, American Elijah King was chosen with the song "Vida". In March 2014, FIFA also announced the addition of an official anthem, selecting the song "Dar um Jeito (We Will Find a Way)", recorded by Avicii, Carlos Santana, Wyclef Jean and Alexandre Pires.

== Ball ==
As part of the marketing for the competition, the Local Organising Committee and Adidas arranged a competition to name the match ball to be used in the competition. Adidas Brazuca was selected by a public vote organised with over one million Brazilian football fans voting. The name Brazuca was chosen with 77.8% of the vote. Two other voting options were given: Bossa Nova (14.6% of the vote) and Carnavalesca (7.6% of the vote).

== Sponsorship ==
The sponsors of the 2014 World Cup are divided into three categories: FIFA Partners, FIFA World Cup Sponsors and National Supporters.

FIFA partners	FIFA World Cup sponsors	National supporters
Adidas; Coca-Cola; Emirates; Hyundai–Kia; Sony; Visa	Anheuser-Busch InBev; Castrol; Continental; McDonald's; Johnson & Johnson; Marfrig; Yingli Solar; Oi	Apex-Brasil; Garoto; Centauro; Banco Itaú; Liberty Seguros; Wiseup

=== Fanhansa ===
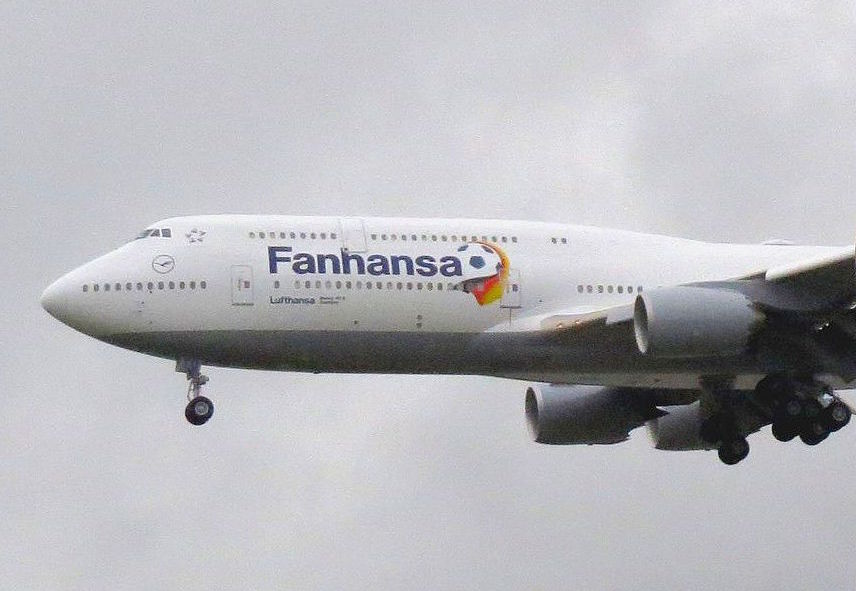
Fanhansa plane, May 2014.

In the summer of 2014 (starting 16 May and thereby not just in response to the German victory) a part of the Lufthansa fleet was renamed “Fanhansa”. As a partner of the German Football Association, Lufthansa flew the national team, media representatives and football fans to Brazil.

== Ticketing ==
FIFA forecasts a total of 3,334,524 tickets for the tournament. The majority of these are distributed to groups such as commercial affiliates, hospitality clients, media rights holders and VIPs. Approximately 1.1 million are to be sold directly to the general public (400,000 to Brazilian residents only, 700,000 overseas); for each individual match, 8% of the tickets are reserved for fans of a competing team. The sale of tickets to the general public has been divided into three phases and handled via FIFA's website and nominated locations in each of the host cities. There are four categories of tickets, with Category 4 tickets only being available to Brazilian residents. Discounted tickets are available to Brazilians aged over 60, students and those receiving Bolsa Família welfare. These, the cheapest of all tickets, were available for 30 Brazilian reals (roughly US$12.50), while the most expensive ticket of the competition on general sale is a Category 1 seat for the final that retails at US$990. In addition to individual tickets, "venue specific tickets", which give access to all matches staged in a host city (during the group stage and round of 16), and "team ticket series", which give access to all matches of a chosen team during the tournament, are also available.

Tickets first went on sale on 20 August 2013 with 2.3 million tickets requested during the first 24 hours. By the end of this first phase of sales in October 2013, over six million requests had been received from the general public. As demand exceeded supply, FIFA staged a random draw to allocate tickets with a total of 889,305 tickets being allocated. A further 220,000 tickets issued on a first come, first served basis sold out within seven hours of being placed on sale in November 2013.

Following the final draw in December 2013, the second sales phase began and concluded the following month, attracting over 3.5 million applications. Any remaining tickets were then made available on a first-come, first-served basis from March 2014 onward and could also be purchased in person at designated FIFA ticketing centres. From 15 April 2014 all remaining tickets were made available on a first-come, first-served basis. Despite the two oversubscribed application periods, tickets still remained available for some group stage matches as the tournament began.
