= Alexandre Pires discography =

- Studio albums: 11
- Live albums: 2
- Compilation albums: 3
- Singles: 32
- Music videos: 22

The discography of Alexandre Pires, a Brazilian singer-songwriter, consists of eleven studio albums, two live albums, three compilations and other album appearances. In 2001, Pires released his first solo album to much success. He has continued to release albums both in Portuguese and in Spanish achieving several hits in Latin charts. In 2007, he released a tribute album to Spanish singer Julio Iglesias. Also in 2007 he met and had a duet on the song titled "Junto A Ti" with Kika Edgar from the telenovela Bajo las Riendas del Amor.

== Albums ==
=== Studio albums ===
List of studio albums, with selected chart positions and certifications
Title	Album details	Peak chart positions		Certifications
Title	Album details	US Latin	US Latin Pop	Certifications
Alexandre Pires / É Por Amor	Released: July 3, 2001; Formats: CD, digital download; Label: Sony	3	2	RIAA: 2× Platinum (Latin)
Minha Vida, Minha Música	Released: September 24, 2002; Formats: CD, digital download; Label: Sony	—	—	
Estrella Guía	Released: March 18, 2003; Formats: CD, digital download; Label: Sony	12	6	RIAA: Platinum (Latin)
Alma Brasileira	Released: October 26, 2004; Formats: CD, digital download; Label: Sony	—	—	
Auto-Falante	Released: January 4, 2005; Formats: CD, digital download; Label: Sony	—	—	
Meu Samba	Released: January 4, 2005; Formats: CD, digital download; Label: Sony	—	—	
A Un Idolo	Released: April 3, 2007; Formats: CD, digital download; Label: Sony	68	18	
Passport Not Required (with Bobby Broom and Sergio Pires)	Released: May 18, 2007; Formats: CD, digital download; Label: Sony	—	—	
Juntos (with Ricardo Montaner)	Released: April 15, 2008; Formats: CD, digital download; Label: Sony	—	—	
Mais Alem	Released: April 10, 2010; Formats: CD, digital download; Label: Sony	—	—	
"—" denotes releases that did not chart or were not released in that territory.

=== Compilations ===
List of studio albums, with selected chart positions and certifications
Title	Album details	Peak chart positions	
Title	Album details	US Latin	US Latin Pop
O Melhor de Alexandre Pires	Released: March 6, 2007; Formats: CD, digital download; Label: Sony	—	—
Éxitos...Sólo Para Usted	Released: April 19, 2007; Formats: CD, digital download; Label: Sony	49	14
Mis Favoritas	Released: October 31, 2011; Formats: CD, digital download; Label: Sony	—	—
"—" denotes releases that did not chart or were not released in that territory.

=== Live albums ===
List of albums
Title	Album details
Em Casa - Ao Vivo	Released: February 22, 2008; Formats: CD, digital download; Label: Sony
Mais Além - Ao Vivo	Released: December 10, 2010; Formats: CD, digital download; Label: Sony
Eletrosamba	Released: July 16, 2012; Formats: CD, digital download; Label: Sony

== Singles ==
=== As lead artist ===
List of singles as lead artist, with selected chart positions, showing year released and album name
Title	Year	Peak chart positions					Album
Title	Year	US	US Latin	US Latin Pop	US Tropical	POR	Album
"Usted Se Me Llevó La Vida"	2001	—	5	18	—	—	Alexandre Pires
"Necesidad"	2001	—	5	1	—	—	Alexandre Pires
"Es Por Amor"	2002	—	8	4	—	—	Alexandre Pires
"A Musa das Minhas Canções"	2002	—	—	—	—	—	Minha Vida, Minha Música
"Amame"	2003	—^{[A]}	2	2	2	—	Estrella Guia
"Quietemonos La Ropa"	2003	—	3	8	17	—	Estrella Guia
"En El Silencio Negro De La Noche"	2003	—	24	14	—	—	Estrella Guia
"Bum Bum Bum"	2003	—	—	—	—	—	Estrella Guia
"Cosa Del Destino"	2004	—	4	6	5	—	Alma Brasileira
"Ao Sentir o Amor" (featuring Fat Family)	2004	—	—	—	—	—	Alto-Falante
"Tira Ela de Mim"	2005	—	—	—	—	—	Meu Samba
"Apelo"	2005	—	—	—	—	—	Meu Samba
"Eva Meu Amor"	2006	—	—	—	—	—	Meu Samba
"A Deus Eu Peço"	2006	—	—	—	—	—	Meu Samba
"Lo Mejor de Tu Vida"	2007	—	23	9	—	—	A Un Idolo
"Pode Chorar"	2008	—	—	—	—	7	Em Casa - Ao Vivo
"Delírios de Amor" (featuring Revelação)	2008	—	—	—	—	—	Em Casa - Ao Vivo
"Estrela Cadente" (featuring Ivete Sangalo)	2008	—	—	—	—	—	Em Casa - Ao Vivo
"Dessa Vez Eu Me Rendo"	2008	—	—	—	—	—	Em Casa - Ao Vivo
"Cigano"	2009	—	—	—	—	—	Em Casa - Ao Vivo
"Só Por Um Momento"	2009	—	—	—	—	—	Em Casa - Ao Vivo
"Eu Sou o Samba" (featuring Seu Jorge)	2010	—	—	—	—	—	Mais Além
"Quem É Você?"	2010	—	—	—	—	—	Mais Além
"Erro Meu"	2010	—	—	—	—	—	Mais Além
"Sissi"	2011	—	—	—	—	—	Mais Além - Ao Vivo
"Se Quer Saber"	2011	—	—	—	—	—	Mais Além - Ao Vivo
"Kong" (featuring Mr. Catra)	2012	—	—	—	—	—	—
"A Chave é o Seu Perdão"	2012	—	—	—	—	—	Eletrosamba
"Maluca Pirada" (featuring Mumuzinho)	2012	—	—	—	—	—	Eletrosamba
"Barraqueira"	2015	—	—	—	—	—	Pecado Original
"Meu Sangue Ferve Por Você"	2015	—	—	—	—	—	Pecado Original
"—" denotes a recording that did not chart or was not released in that territory.

=== As featured artist ===
List of singles as featured artist, with selected chart positions, showing year released and album name
Title	Year	Peak chart positions	Album
Title	Year	BEL	Album
"Que Cante la Vida" (among Artists for Chile)	2010	—	Non-album single
"Dar um Jeito (We Will Find a Way)" (Santana and Wyclef featuring Avicii and Alexandre Pires)	2014	66	One Love, One Rhythm
"—" denotes a recording that did not chart or was not released in that territory.

== Notes ==
Notes

- A : "Amame" did not enter the Billboard Hot 100, but peaked at number 14 on the Bubbling Under Hot 100 Singles chart.
