= Always on My Mind (Adelén song) =

"Always On My Mind"

Single by Adelén
- Released: March 14, 2014
- Recorded: 2014
- Genre: Electro house; dance-pop; latin pop
- Length: 3:04
- Label: Sony Music Entertainment Norway; Eccentric Music
- Songwriters: Ina Wroldsen; Andreas Romdhane; Josef Larossi
- Producers: Quiz & Larossi

Adelén singles chronology
"Baila Conmigo" (2013)	"Always On My Mind" (2014)	"Olé" (2014)

Music video
- "Always On My Mind" on YouTube

Always On My Mind is a single by Norwegian singer Adelén. It was released by Sony Music Entertainment Norway as her third single on March 14, 2014. It was only released in Norway. Like her previous singles, this single also includes preferences from Mediterranean music style.

== Music video ==
The music video was released on YouTube on March 14, 2014. The video begins as Adelén standing in a dark place. In the next scenes, Adelén is shown singing and dancing. Another scene, Adelén is playing in the spray of a fire hydrant. In the next scene, Adelén is later shown singing and dancing with the backup dancers. Another scene, Adelén is holding balloons. The scenes are shown repeatedly throughout the video.

== Track listings ==
Digital download
No.	Title	Writer(s)	Producer(s)	Length
1.	"Always On My Mind"	Ina Wroldsen; Andreas Romdhane; Josef Larossi	Quiz & Larossi	3:04

== Charts ==
Chart (2014)	Peak position
Finland (Suomen virallinen radiolista)	50
Spain Airplay (PROMUSICAE)	37

== Release history ==
Country	Date	Format	Label
Norway	14 March 2014	Digital Download	Eccentric Music
