= Danijay =

- Born: Daniele Zaffiri; April 19, 1977 (age 48)
- Origin: Genoa, Italy
- Genres: Italo dance, Eurodance
- Years active: 2003–present

Danijay (born Daniele Zaffiri, 19 April 1977) is an Italian Italo dance DJ and artist from Genoa, Italy, Danijay began deejaying in 1994 and producing in 2003. His first single, Il Gioco dell'Amore (The Game of Love) was released in 2003 and became a European dance radio hit and one of the best-selling dance singles of the year. His second single, "I Fiori di Lillà" (The Lilacs) featured Italian singer-songwriter Alberto Fortis and was played on the Italian quiz show Passa Parola. In 2004, his third single, "Luna Nera", was released, and in 2005 was followed up by "Say Me" and "Condition", both of which made the Top 10 Sales Chart for Italian megastores (fnac, Ricordi, etc.). In 2005, his track "L'Impazienza" (Impatience), representing Italy in the Eurodanceweb Award, placed second, and was downloaded over 700,000 times in one month, in addition to holding the top spot on the Italian dance radio network M2O. Danijay released his first album, Dance and Breakfast on the Universal label. Past releases were on the New Music International and Reactor labels. In December 2006 produced the single "Time 4 Xmas" dedicated to Christmas.

He has worked with Luca Zeta for the compilation Dance Passion Volume 1 (2006), Dance Passion Volume 2 (2007) and Dance Passion Volume 3 (2008). Together with Dj Provenzano has collaborated in the creation of "Catch Me" and "Ride The Way". In June 2008 comes the revolutionary second album, whose work has involved the staff for many months: Plug & Play contains the work of the last two years: 31 songs published with an innovative concept. For the first time ever an audio-video player is intended as support, instead of the CD, allowing a variety of content up to that moment than ever.

== Live Set ==
Danijay endorses an advanced computer mixing console. He has performed in the most important clubs and night spots in Italy, Spain, France, Slovenia, Germany and Austria. His DJ-sets blend instinct and technical precision, while his powerful and emotional live shows combine his mixing talent with the vocal skills of his singers Axel (Alessio Gorziglia) and Henry (Marcello Bellanti).

== Team ==
- Axel (Alessio Gorziglia): Singer - Author - Graphic - Computer Sciences. He started singing LUNA NERA in 2004, then L'IMPAZIENZA, ENCANTO, just to cite the most famous. Even in PLUG & PLAY many songs with his voice. Over the years Axel has extended its mission helping to write the lyrics and vocal lines / melodic songs. Starting from Dance & Breakfast, then more and more, has put his talents at the service of graphic design working actively to singles graphics, album covers, postcards, site. Axel has a degree in Computer Science and also in this area gives its contribution to the site, the Forum and of course the technology behind PLUG & PLAY.
- Henry (Marcello Enrico Bellanti): Author - Composer - Arranger - Singer - Computer Sciences. Besides working for the creation and development of the songs, with particular attention to the composition of the parties harmonics, Henry is also heading (in many cases soloist) in numerous productions, as SAY ME, TURN AROUND, THE SOUND OF LOVE, LUNA NERA (live edition), BACK 2 U, RIDE A GIRL, ANGEL, RITMO D'EFFETTO, not to mention his appearance as "whistle" in CATCH ME. Degree in Computer Science, over the years Henry has extended its contribution to the field of graphics, ensuring among other things the photographic section of the site and in charge of setting up some wallpaper in PLUG & PLAY.
- Eddy (Edoardo Bellanti): Videographer - Graphic - Guitarist - Expert in Information Technology and Communication. It occupies the development and implementation of video, Web site and graphics, especially in 3D. With the album DANCE & BREAKFAST, was able to realize his passion for playing guitar in the song THE SOUND OF LOVE, and then continue to play its part in productions such as CATCH ME, RIGHT OR WRONG - DANIJAY RMX, UNTIL THE MORNING, QUANDO PIOVE . Eddy has a degree in Communication Sciences, and at the time of album release has made available its expertise in the promotion and marketing on the web PLUG & PLAY.
- Ayla (Monica Paola Burattini): Translator - PR for Italy and abroad. Professional translator, collaborated in the drafting of the texts, focusing in particular adaptation in a foreign language. He deals with the first selection of news that will be broadcast in "Chemical Area". In Plug & Play was responsible for relations with foreign suppliers and cooperated in setting up the shop online because of its experience in this field.

== Singles ==
- Il Gioco dell'Amore (2003)
- I Fiori di Lillà (1 Dec 2003)
- Luna Nera (21 Jun 2004)
- Say Me / Condition (18 Apr 2005)
- L'Impazienza
- Encanto (2006)
- Time 4 Xmas (2007)

== Albums ==
- 2006 - Dance and Breakfast
- 2008 - Plug & Play
