= Olé (Adelén song) =

Single by Adelén

from the album One Love, One Rhythm
- Released: May 12, 2014
- Recorded: 2014
- Genre: Latin pop; dance; electropop
- Length: 3:19
- Label: Sony Music Entertainment
- Songwriter(s): Ina Wroldsen, Andreas Romdhane, Josef Larossi

Adelén singles chronology
"Always on My Mind" (2014)	"Olé" (2014)	"Spell On Me" (2015)

"Olé" is a 2014 anthem song performed by Norwegian singer Adelén. The song is an anthem for the FIFA World Cup 2014 in Brazil and is track number 11 on the album One Love, One Rhythm – The 2014 FIFA World Cup Official Album. The song peaked at number 3 in Norway.

== Composition ==
"Olé" is an uptempo Latin pop track with influences of dance music and pop rock. The song features drum beats, Caribbean-style music and electronic beats with Adelén singing. The song itself has a skip beat when it changes. The song uses samples from Steam's "Na Na Hey Hey Kiss Him Goodbye" in the refrain.

== Music video ==
The music video was directed by Ray Kay and shot in Rio de Janeiro.

== Charts ==
Chart (2014)	Peak position
Norway (VG-lista)	3
Poland (Dance Top 50)	50
