= Vida (Ricky Martin song) =

Single by Ricky Martin

from the album One Love, One Rhythm
- Released: April 22, 2014
- Recorded: 2014
- Studio: Instrument Zoo (Miami); Hit Factory Criteria (Miami); Louder than Life Labs (New York City)
- Genre: Latin pop
- Length: 3:25
- Label: Sony
- Songwriters: Ricky Martin; Salaam Remi; Elijah King; Afo Verde; Roxana Amed
- Producers: Salaamremi.com; David Cabrera

Ricky Martin singles chronology
"Adrenalina" (2014)	"Vida" (2014)	"Adiós" (2014)

Music video
- "Vida" on YouTube

"Vida" (English: "Life") is a song recorded by Puerto Rican singer Ricky Martin for the One Love, One Rhythm – The 2014 FIFA World Cup Official Album (2014). It was written by Martin, Salaam Remi, Elijah King, Afo Verde, Roxana Amed and produced by Remi. The song was chosen in a musical contest organized by FIFA and Sony Music which King won, and it was subsequently arranged for Martin to record the track. It was digitally released as the second single from the compilation album on April 22, 2014. "Vida" is a Latin pop song that features guitar, ukulele, percussion, horn and "exotic sounds with a Caribbean feel".

The song received generally positive reviews from music critics who praised the liveliness of the track and noted the consistency with other songs performed by Martin. It peaked at number five on the US Hot Latin Songs and became Martin's 23rd top-ten single on the chart. An accompanying music video, directed by Kátia Lund and Lívia Gama of Bossa Nova Films, was shot in Rio de Janeiro. It features Martin singing and dancing on the beach accompanied by around 100 other people. Martin performed the song on several occasions including at the 2014 Latin Billboard Music Awards and on season eighteen of the Dancing with the Stars US series.

With the release of the single "Vida", Ricky Martin achieved what no international artist had achieved, occupying the # 1 position on the list of local, popular and domestic music in the same week in China.

== Production and release ==
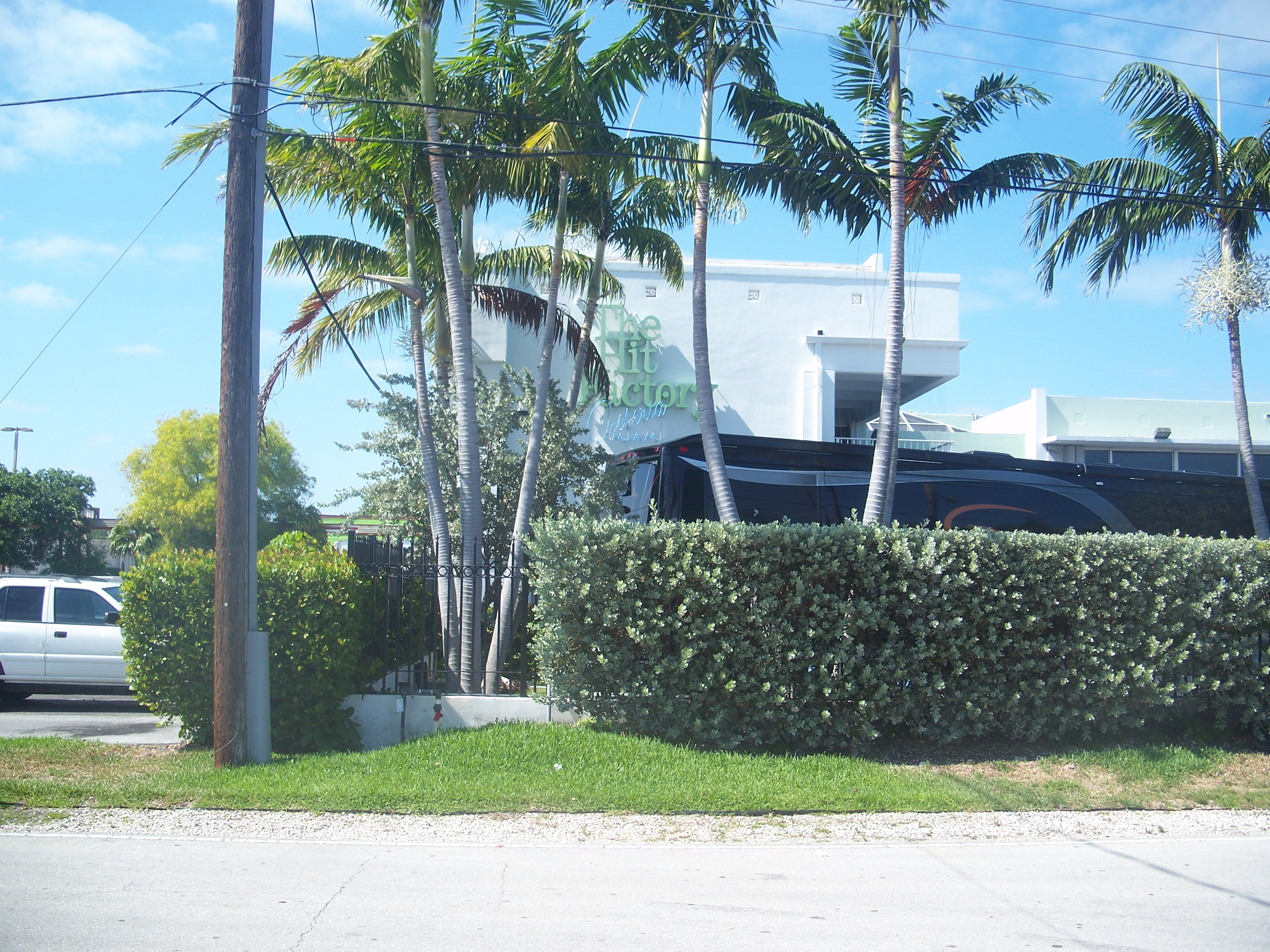
Hit Factory Criteria Miami, one of the recording locations of "Vida"

In December 2013 FIFA and Sony Music Entertainment launched a worldwide music contest inviting aspiring musicians and football fans to submit original song proposals. The organizers received over 1600 compositions from musicians and fans originating from 29 countries. In February 2014 it was announced that Elijah King and his track "Vida" had won the contest; it was chosen by Martin, a judging panel, and by public vote. The song was co-written by Ricky Martin, King and Salaam Remi with additional writing from Afo Verde and Roxana Amed for the Spanish and Portuguese version of the song. It was produced by Remi under his production name Salaamremi.com. Subsequently, the song was set to be recorded by Martin himself and included on the One Love, One Rhythm – The 2014 FIFA World Cup Official Album (2014). The singer previously recorded and sang "La Copa de la Vida (The Cup of Life)", which served as the official song of the 1998 FIFA World Cup.

Following the announcement, King traveled to Miami where he worked with Martin and Remi to finish the track. Gleyder "Gee" Disla recorded the song at the Instrument Zoo and Hit Factory Criteria in Miami and Louder than Life Labs in New York City. Enrique Larreal provided the vocal engineering and editing, while David Cabrera served as an additional vocal producer. Disla mixed "Vida" at Instrument Zoo, while Ari Blitz and Larry Ryckman served as the mastering engineers. Martin, King and Domingo Ramos sang the background vocals. Vincent Henry and Dan Warner played the guitar, the latter also provided the ukulele, Hal Riston played the horn and Robert Villahara was responsible for the percussion.

The Spanglish version of the song was released as the second official single from One Love, One Rhythm – The 2014 FIFA World Cup Official Album. On April 22, 2014, it was digitally launched in Austria, Germany, Switzerland the United Kingdom, and the United States. An extended play consisting of Spanish, Portuguese, and Spanglish versions together with a remix from David Cabrera Bahía was released on May 6 in France and Italy. Additionally, the EP was released in the United Kingdom and the United States among other countries on the same date. Apart from that material, the Spanish extended play release also contains the Predikator Remix, Brian Cross Extended Club Remix and Brian Cross Remix of "Vida". On June 10, a Bubu Borgex Remix of "Vida" was released worldwide including in Austria, Germany, Spain, United Kingdom and the United States. The Afrojack remix of the song was launched on July 1.

== Controversy ==
On April 25, 2014, it was announced that Hundred Proof Club, Think Famous Productions, Akela Family and JDK Entertainment were suing Sony Music and King for fraud in the Sony and FIFA's SuperSong competition. The lawsuit claimed that the competition was rigged and that King, who co-wrote "Vida" was always going to win, cheating the other entrants out of their chance of winning the competition. Although the contest was open to applicants worldwide, King had a contractual agreement and Sony apparently asked King to enter the song "Vida": Sony allegedly pressured the plaintiffs to release King from his contract so that he would be eligible to win, in return for compensation.

The lawsuit alleges that Sony induced King's release from his publishing contract and refused to pay compensation. The attorney Alicia Roman told The Huffington Post, "[We're looking to] annul the release due to the fraud they committed. When it's annulled, all of the rights to Elijah's songs are returned to my client, particularly the song 'Vida' that Ricky Martin sang." Martin has not made any comment on the lawsuit. Additionally, Luis Adrian Cortes Ramos, a finalist from the first season of Idol Puerto Rico filled a $10 million lawsuit towards Martin. He sued the singer for releasing "Vida" despite claims that he submitted his version of the track as part of SuperSong contest, a version that was never recognized. Ramos' lawyer released a statement saying "Ramos was surprised, disillusioned and suffered mental anguish because the song was almost identical to the one he composed. Until that moment, Martin was an idol for Ramos." However, Martin's representative never commented on the lawsuit.

== Composition ==
"Vida" is a Latin pop song that lasts for three minutes and twenty-five seconds. It features guitar, ukulele, percussion, guitar and "exotic sounds, with a Caribbean feel". Carolina Moreno of The Huffington Post described the song as upbeat and energetic. Lyrically, the single is about the ability of the football tournament to bring people from different parts of the world together to celebrate and enjoy 'the good life'.

== Reception ==
=== Critical ===
Melissa Redman of Renowned for Sound gave the song three and half stars out of five and wrote that "the track is everything you would expect from Ricky Martin and a single for a global sports event." She also stated that although the song is not "groundbreaking" it is "a lively and exuberant track that people are bound to bop away to". Redman concluded that it is better than Pitbull's "We Are One (Ole Ola)", which serves as the official song of the tournament. Mike Wass of website Idolator wrote, "there's something to be said for consistency and Ricky sure knows how to knock out a summery smash with generic Spanglish lyrics that probably sound pretty inspiring after a couple of Coronas." "Vida" received nomination for a Start-Party song at the 2014 Premios Tu Mundo held on August 21, 2014. In 2022, Noelia Bertol from Cadena Dial ranked it as one of the "10 Ricky Martin songs that brighten up summers".

=== Commercial ===
Following Martin's performance of the song at the 2014 Latin Billboard Music Awards "Vida" entered at number four on the US Latin Digital Songs chart after selling 6000 copies in its first week. Subsequently, the single debuted at number 10 on the US Hot Latin Songs; it became Martin's 23rd top 10 single on the chart. It peaked at number five on the latter chart. It was more successful on the US Latin Pop Songs chart where it peaked at number four. "Vida" debuted at number 20 on the Spanish Singles Chart. In its fourth week the single reached its peak of number five. Additionally, it peaked at number 12 in the Dominican Republic and number 16 in Mexico, a pop charts part of Monitor Latino. It was less successful in Australia and South Korea where it peaked at number 75 and 146 respectively.

== Music video ==
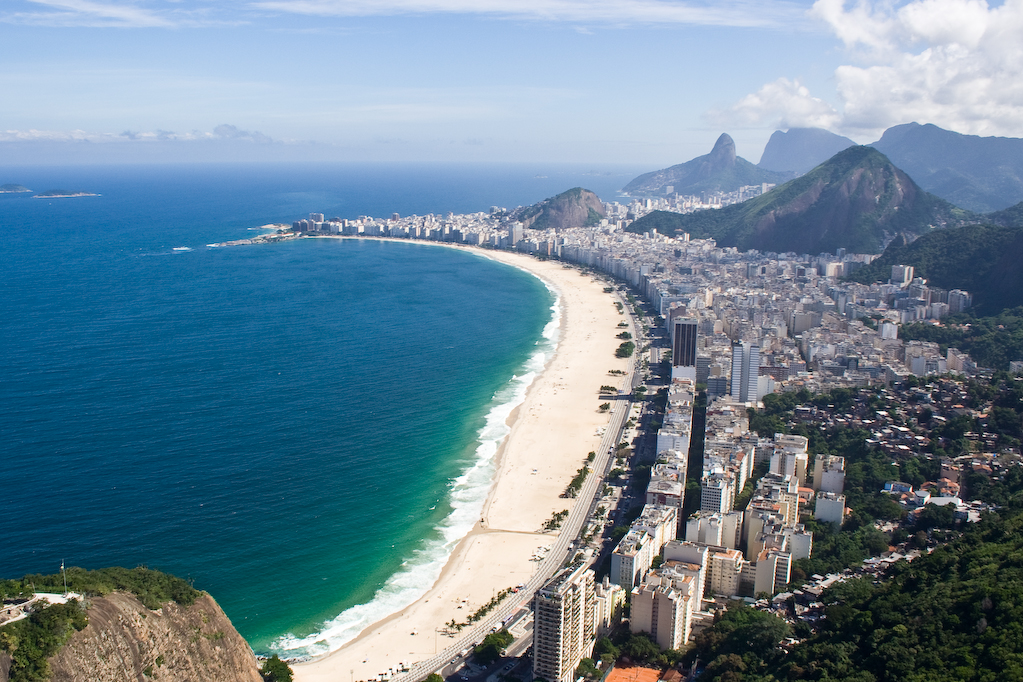
The music video for "Vida" was filmed at the beaches of Rio de Janeiro.

The music video for "Vida" was filmed in Rio de Janeiro and was directed by Kátia Lund and Lívia Gama of Bossa Nova Films. According to Lund, "The lyrics and the emotion that are reflected in the video for "Vida" inspire a celebration of life, in a way that is pure and simple: the sun, coming together and the energy." She said that the visual is about life in which differences are celebrated and appreciated easily and with happiness and claimed that was the reason Martin "just wanted it to be natural" and to differ from what he had done before with choreography, big sets and directed scenes. Martin also commented the shooting process, "It's an incredible feeling to have had the opportunity to participate in a global initiative like SuperSong. I'm very excited to finally be able to sing 'Vida' and share this special song with the world." On April 21, Martin released a teaser from the video on his official social networks, while the full video premiered on his Vevo channel on YouTube the next day. It features the singer relaxing in shorts and a tank-top while he sings on the beaches of Rio de Janeiro. The video also contains around 100 extras including kids, samba dancers, models and others intended to represent the diversity of the Brazilian nation. Wass of Idolator praised the video, writing that Martin "looks great" in it and mentioned the Brazilian scenery was "pretty awesome".

== Live performances ==
Martin performed "Vida" for first time at the 2014 Chinese Music Awards on April 23, 2014, where he also sang his 2013 single "Come with Me". He performed the song again on April 24 at the 2014 Billboard Latin Music Awards. A writer from Billboard described it as a "vibrant, colorful performance". On April 28, the singer performed "Vida" on a season eighteen episode of the American dance show competition Dancing with the Stars; he was accompanied by the show's Pro Dancers. Martin performed the single on The Ellen DeGeneres Show on May 2 while three days later, on May 5, he performed the song on The Queen Latifah Show. He also performed the song on May 18, at the 2014 Billboard Music Awards. On November 14 it was part of Martin's performance at the opening ceremony of the 22nd Central American and Caribbean Games.

== Formats and track listing ==
- Digital download
1. "Vida (Spanglish version)" – 3:25
- Digital EP
1. "Vida (Spanglish version)" – 3:26
2. "Vida (David Cabrera Bahia Remix)" – 3:39
3. "Vida (Spanish version)" – 3:23
4. "Vida (Portuguese version)" – 3:23
- Dudu Borges Remix
1. "Vida (Dudu Borges Remix)" – 3:32
- Spanish digital EP
1. "Vida (Spanglish version)" – 3:26
2. "Vida (David Cabrera Bahia Remix)" – 3:39
3. "Vida (Spanish version)" – 3:23
4. "Vida (Portuguese version)" – 3:23
5. "Vida (Predikador Remix)" – 3:30
6. "Vida (Brian Cross Extended Club Remix)" – 6:05
7. "Vida (Brian Cross Remix)" – 3:50
- Afrojack Remix
1. "Vida (Afrojack Remix)" – 3:26

== Credits and personnel ==
Recording

- Recorded at Instrument Zoo, Hit Factory Criteria (Miami); Louder than Life Labs (New York City); Sony Music Studios (Sydney)
- Mixed at Instrument Zoo

Personnel

- Songwriting – Ricky Martin, Salaam Remi, Elijah King, Afo Verde, Roxana Amed
- Production – Salaamremi.com
- Recording engineers – Gleyder "Gee" Disla
- Vocal engineering and editing – Enrique Larreal
- Vocal engineering (Spanish/Portuguese) - Adrian Breakspear
- Additional vocal production – David Cabrera
- Mixed By – Gleyder "Gee" Disla
- Mastering – Ari Blitz, Larry Ryckman
- Additional programming – Hal Ritson, Michelle Balduzi
- Background vocals – Ricky Martin, Elijah King, Domingo Ramos
- Guitar – Vincent Henry, Dan Warner
- Ukulele – Dan Warner
- Horn – Hal Ritson
- Percussion – Robert Villahara
- Extra percussion and drum programming – David Cabrera, Enrique Larreal
- Production coordinator – Kim Lumpkin

Credits adapted from the liner notes of One Love, One Rhythm – The 2014 FIFA World Cup Official Album, RCA Records.

== Charts ==
=== Weekly charts ===
Chart (2014)	Peak position
Australia (ARIA)	75
Dominican Republic Pop (Monitor Latino)	12
Italy (FIMI)	98
Mexico (Billboard Mexican Airplay)	7
Mexico Pop (Monitor Latino)	16
Russia Airplay (Tophit)	168
South Korea (Gaon Download Chart)	146
Spain (Promusicae)	5
US Hot Latin Songs (Billboard)	5
US Latin Airplay (Billboard)	2
US Latin Pop Airplay (Billboard)	4

=== Year-end charts ===
Chart (2014)	Position
US Hot Latin Songs (Billboard)	44
US Latin Pop Songs (Billboard)	47

== Certifications and sales ==
Region	Certification	Certified units/sales
Mexico (AMPROFON)	Gold	30,000^{‡}
^{‡} Sales+streaming figures based on certification alone.

== Release history ==
Country	Date	Format	Label
Austria	April 22, 2014	Digital download (Spanglish version)	Sony
Germany	April 22, 2014	Digital download (Spanglish version)	Sony
Spain	April 22, 2014	Digital download (Spanglish version)	Sony
Switzerland	April 22, 2014	Digital download (Spanglish version)	Sony
United Kingdom	April 22, 2014	Digital download (Spanglish version)	Sony
United States	April 22, 2014	Digital download (Spanglish version)	Sony
Austria	May 6, 2014	Digital EP	Sony
Canada	May 6, 2014	Digital EP	Sony
France	May 6, 2014	Digital EP	Sony
Germany	May 6, 2014	Digital EP	Sony
Italy	May 6, 2014	Digital EP	Sony
Spain	May 6, 2014	Digital EP	Sony
Switzerland	May 6, 2014	Digital EP	Sony
United Kingdom	May 6, 2014	Digital EP	Sony
United States	May 6, 2014	Digital EP	Sony

Country	Date	Format	Label
Austria	June 10, 2014	Digital download (Dudu Borgex Remix)	Sony
Germany	June 10, 2014	Digital download (Dudu Borgex Remix)	Sony
Spain	June 10, 2014	Digital download (Dudu Borgex Remix)	Sony
Switzerland	June 10, 2014	Digital download (Dudu Borgex Remix)	Sony
United Kingdom	June 10, 2014	Digital download (Dudu Borgex Remix)	Sony
United States	June 10, 2014	Digital download (Dudu Borgex Remix)	Sony
Austria	July 1, 2014	Digital download (Afrojack Remix)	Sony
Canada	July 1, 2014	Digital download (Afrojack Remix)	Sony
France	July 1, 2014	Digital download (Afrojack Remix)	Sony
Germany	July 1, 2014	Digital download (Afrojack Remix)	Sony
Italy	July 1, 2014	Digital download (Afrojack Remix)	Sony
Spain	July 1, 2014	Digital download (Afrojack Remix)	Sony
Switzerland	July 1, 2014	Digital download (Afrojack Remix)	Sony
United Kingdom	July 1, 2014	Digital download (Afrojack Remix)	Sony
United States	July 1, 2014	Digital download (Afrojack Remix)	Sony
