= Estrella Guía =

2003 studio album by Alexandre Pires

Studio album by Alexandre Pires
- Released: March 25, 2003
- Recorded: October 2002 – March 2003
- Studio: Altavox Studio; Nikto Studio; Trendy Studio (Milan); Midas Studio; Studio AR; Studio Be Bop (Río de Janeiro); Mosh Studio (São Paulo); Sonoland Studios (Madrid); Macondo Studio; Midnight Blue Studios; Outline Studios; The Hit Factory (Critiera) (Miami); North Bay Recording Studio (Miami Beach)
- Genre: Latin pop; samba; Latin ballad
- Length: 63:23 (Spanish edition); 52:50 (Brazilian edition)
- Language: Spanish; Portuguese
- Label: BMG U.S. Latin
- Producer: Juan Vicente Zambrano; Danilo Ballo; Emanuele Ruffinengo; Julio C. Reyes; Rey-Nerio; Alexandre Pires; Pedro Ferreira; Rudy Pérez; Antonio Carmona; Fernando Illán

Alexandre Pires chronology
Minha Vida, Minha Música (2002)	Estrella Guía (2003)	Alto-Falante (2004)

Singles from Estrella Guía
- 1. "Ámame" Released: January 27, 2003; 2. "Quitémonos la Ropa" Released: May 19, 2003; 3. "En el Silencio Negro de la Noche" Released: October 20, 2003

Estrella Guía (English: Guiding Star), also released as Estrela Guia for its Brazilian edition, is the third studio album recorded by Brazilian singer-songwriter Alexandre Pires, The album witch released by BMG U.S. Latin on March 25, 2003 (see 2003 in music). The album was produced by Juan Vicente Zambrano, co-produced by Danilo Ballo, Emanuele Ruffinengo, Julio C. Reyes, Rey Nerio, Alexandre Pires, Pedro Ferreira, Rudy Pérez, Antonio Carmona and Fernando Illán and features collaborations with Spanish singers Alejandro Sanz and Rosario. It is the second album by Pires to be released in Spanish, the first one being Alexandre Pires (2001), his debut album released as É Por Amor for its Brazilian edition.

At the 4th Annual Latin Grammy Awards, the album received nominations for Album of the Year and Best Male Pop Vocal Album, being Pires' first Latin Grammy nominations. At the ceremony Pires performed a Spanish-English version of the song "Amame" alongside American singer Kelly Clarkson. The album was also nominated for Pop Album of the Year at the Premio Lo Nuestro 2004.

The album appeared on the Billboard Top Latin Albums and Billboard Latin Pop Albums charts, peaking at positions twelve and six respectively.

== Background ==
The album was recorded during eleven months in different studios in Europe, United States and Brazil, including Altavox Studios and Nitko Studio in Milan, Italy, Sonoland in Spain, Midnightblue Studios and North Bay Recording Studios in Miami, United States, Estudio Mosh in São Paulo, and Studio Be Bop in Rio de Janeiro, among others. It features collaborations with two Spanish singers, Alejandro Sanz in the song "Sólo Que Me Falta" and Rosario in "Inseguridad", about the songs Pires said that "the album is not a Spanish flavored one, those are only two different moments, every song of the album has a different flavour and color, I think we achieved it", he also said that the songs from the album dwell on the "daily life of people". The album also includes a version of Gino Vanelli's 1978 song "I Just Wanna Stop", released under the title "Es Mejor Parar" in the Spanish edition and "É Melhor Parar" in the Brazilian one.

Estrella Guía followed the commercial success achieved by Pires in the Latin American and American markets with his previous solo efforts. Due to its success abroad, BGM's New York office invested US$ 3 million to launch the album in international markets.

== Singles and promotion ==
The album spawned three singles, "Ámame", released on January 27, 2003, "Quitémonos la Ropa", released on May 19, 2003, and "En el Silencio Negro de la Noche", released on October 20, 2003, all three songs charted on the Hot Latin Tracks and Latin Pop Airplay charts, both by Billboard, "Ámame" at number 2 in both, "Quitémonos la Ropa" at 3 and 8, and "En el Silencio Negro de la Noche" at 24 and 14, respectively. Additionally, though "Amame" did not enter the Billboard Hot 100, it peaked at number 14 on the Bubbling Under Hot 100, being Pires' only appearance at the chart.

The three singles were accompanied by music videos, which portrayed a story about a love affair divided in three parts. In "Ámame", Pires portrays a bodyguard for a billionaire and his wife in São Paulo. He then runs away with the wife and has an affair with her. The story continues in "Quitémonos la Ropa" where the millionaire plans a revenge while the couple enjoy their time together. Then, the husband attempts to shoot Pires but the wife intersects, receiving the bullet and dying. Lastly, in "En el Silencio Negro de la Noche", Pires plots his own revenge. A year later, he finds the billionaire, shooting him after a fight and killing him.

== Commercial performance ==
Upon release, Estrella Guía peaked at number 12 at the Top Latin Albums chart, while at the Latin Pop Albums, the album peaked at number 6. It also peaked at number 45 at the Top Heatseekers chart. In the United States, the album was certified platinum, being Pires' second certification in said country. In Pires' native country Brazil, the album was certified gold, being his second album to be certified after Alexandre Pires (2001), which was certified platinum in both its Spanish and Portuguese versions.

The album continued Pires' success in the United States, which was considered a feat due to its genre being mainly pop ballads as well as Pires' racial background. Leila Cobos from Billboard wrote that Pires "is a unique case of a black artist who succeeds in the US without singing salsa, mambo or rap".

== Critical reception ==
Professional ratings
Review scores
Source	Rating
AllMusic	2.5/5 stars

Billboard gave a positive review to the album writing that "with his smooth-as-silk vocals, Brazilian singer Alexandre Pires takes another step forward hearhrob statud among Spanish speakers with this collection of burnished Latin pop, layered arrangements, and soulful vocals".

In a more mixed review, Thom Jurek from AllMusic gave the album two and a half stars out of five writing that the album was "beautifully executed but generic nonetheless" commenting that while Pires was a great vocalist, when he sung in Spanish "the depth of his emotional expression is somewhat stilted", however, Jurek highlighted the two duets in the project as the album's "two most successful moments".

== Track listing ==
Spanish edition (Estrella Guía)
No.	Title	Writer(s)	Producer(s)	Length
1.	"Ay! Corazón"	Juan Vicente Zambrano; Marcela Cárdenas	Juan Vicente Zambrano	3:44
2.	"Ámame"	Cynthia Nilson; Darío Moscatelli	Danilo Ballo; Emanuele Ruffinengo	4:07
3.	"Quitémonos la Ropa"	Estéfano; Julio C. Reyes	Julio C. Reyes; Rey-Nerio	4:18
4.	"En el Silencio Negro de la Noche"	Estéfano; Julio C. Reyes	Julio C. Reyes; Danilo Ballo; Emanuele Ruffinengo	4:27
5.	"Sólo Que Me Falta" (featuring. Alejandro Sanz)	Alexandre Pires; Alejandro Sanz	Alexandre Pires; Emanuele Ruffinengo; Pedro Ferreira	4:52
6.	"Todavía"	Adrián Possé; Cynthia Salazar; Rudy Pérez	Rudy Pérez	3:54
7.	"Se Busca una Mujer"	Yasmil Marrufo	Pedro Ferreira; Juan Vicente Zambrano	4:18
8.	"Estrella Guía"	Alexandre Pires · Katty; Adapt: Spanish: Estéfano	Alexandre Pires; Pedro Ferreira	4:15
9.	"Bum, Bum, Bum"	Estéfano; Julio C. Reyes	Julio C. Reyes; Danilo Ballo; Emanuele Ruffinengo	4:29
10.	"Inseguridad" (featuring. Rosario)	Alexandre Pires · Lourenço; Adapt: Spanish: Karla Aponte	Antonio Carmona; Fernando Illán	4:11
11.	"Para Sentir Aquello"	Manuel Alejandro	Alexandre Pires; Pedro Ferreira	3:28
12.	"A Gozar la Vida"	Juan Marcelo; Paula De Jesús	Emmanuele Ruffinengo; Danilo Ballo	4:28
13.	"Es Mejor Parar" (I Just Wanna Stop)	Ross Vannelli; Adapt: Spanish: Karla Aponte	Alexandre Pires; Pedro Ferreira	3:36
14.	"Dos Locos Enamorados"	Estéfano; Donato Póveda	Julio C. Reyes; Emanuele Ruffinengo	5:27
15.	"Prisionero de Amor"	Alexandre Pires · Lourenço · Pedro Ferreira; Adapt: Spanish: Cynthia Salazar	Alexandre Pires; Pedro Ferreiro	4:18
Total length:				63:23

Brazilian edition (Estrela Guia)
No.	Title	Writer(s)	Producer(s)	Length
1.	"Vem Me Amar" (Amame)	Cynthia Nilson; Dario Moscatelli	Emanuele Ruffinengo; Danilo Ballo	4:00
2.	"Boom, Boom, Boom" (Bum, Bum, Bum)	Estefano Salgado; Julio Reyes	Julio Reyes	4:18
3.	"Eu Tiro a Roupa" (Quitémonos la Ropa)	Salgado	Reyes	4:10
4.	"Eu Ainda Não Sei" (Todavía)	Adrián Posse; Cynthia Salazar; Rudy Pérez	Rudy Pérez	3:52
5.	"Ai, Coracão" (Ay! Corazón)	Carlos Colla; Juan Vicente Zambrano; Marcela Cardenas	Juan Vicente Zambrano	3:39
6.	"É Melhor Parar"	Alexandre Pires; Ross Vannelli	Alexandre Pires; Pedro Ferreira	3:17
7.	"Estrela Guia"	Pires; Katty	Pires; Ferreira	4:12
8.	"Prisioneiro Do Amor"	Pires; Lourenço; Ferreira	Pires; Ferreira	3:46
9.	"Para Viver Aquilo" (Para Sentir Aquello)	Manuel Alejandro	Pires; Ferreira	3:25
10.	"Neguinho Danado"	Fernando Pires; João Junior; Lourenço; Pedro Ferreira	Ferreira	4:46
11.	"En el Silencio Negro de la Noche"	Salgado	Reyes	4:21
12.	"Inseguridad" (featuring Rosario)	Pires; Lourenço; Ferreira	Antonio Carmona; Fernando Illan	4:07
13.	"Sólo Que Me Falta" (featuring Alejandro Sanz)	Alejandro Sanz; Pires	Pires; Ruffinengo; Ferreira	4:50
Total length:				52:50

== Charts ==
Weekly chart performance for Estrella Guía
Chart (2003)	Peak position
US Top Latin Albums (Billboard)	12
US Latin Pop Albums (Billboard)	6
US Heatseekers Albums (Billboard)	45

== Certifications ==
Region	Certification	Certified units/sales
Brazil (Pro-Música Brasil)	Gold	50,000^{*}
United States (RIAA)	Platinum (Latin)	100,000^{^}
^{*} Sales figures based on certification alone.^{^} Shipments figures based on certification alone.
