= Angie Be =

- Born: Élodie Bouche; 1977 (age 48–49)
- Origin: France
- Genres: Pop
- Occupations: Singer, model
- Years active: 2009–present

Angie Be (born 1977) pseudonym of Élodie Bouche, is a French singer and former candidate of Secret Story 2009 (France). Her single "Soundwaves" reached number 17 on the French charts in 2009 and remained on the chart for almost one year. In December 2009, a French version of Soundwaves was available digitally. This version was in the musical programming of Fun Radio during October 2009 – March 2010.

She created and directed a manicure company at home from 2007 to 2009 in Southern France. She was especially known for her television appearances as model for the muscle stimulator Sport-Elec brand and her performances as Jenny on the automoto.fr site after her participation in the TV reality show.

She is the mother of a little girl, Manon, and is now separated from the father of this one. She dated another candidate of the TV show, Romain Chavent, and was to marry him, but announced two months later that the marriage was annulled.

In 2009, she won the Eurodanceweb Award with her single "Soundwaves". Her next single will be "Forever".

== Awards and nominations ==
| Year | Award | Category | Recipient | Outcome |
|---|---|---|---|---|
| 2009 | Eurodanceweb Award | "European Dance Music Awards" | "Angie Be" | Won |
