= Só Pra Contrariar =

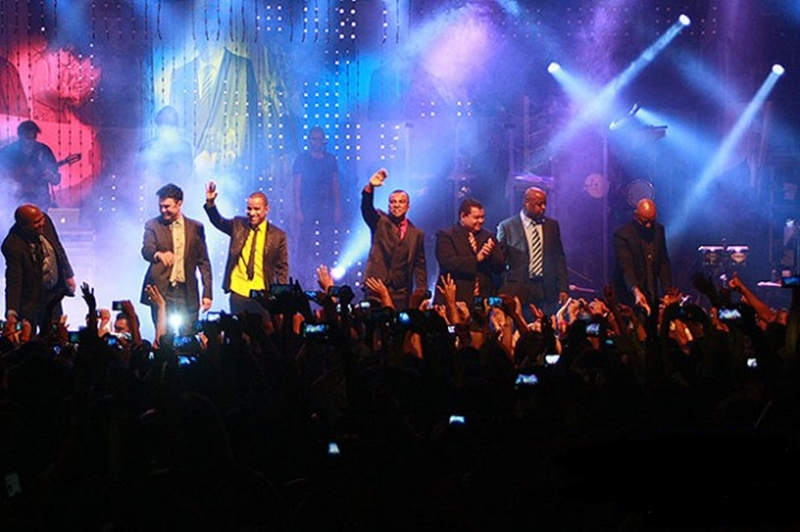
- Só Pra Contrariar - live concert in 2014

Background information
- Origin: Uberlândia, Minas Gerais, Brazil
- Genres: Pagode and Samba-reggae
- Years active: 1989–present

Só Pra Contrariar (translates to Just (only) to be contrary) is a Brazilian musical group formed in 1989. Their 1997 album Só Pra Contrariar is one of the best selling albums in Brazil, selling more than three million copies. The band is known for its frontman, Alexandre Pires, who has launched a successful solo career after the band's break-up.

== Band history ==
Só Pra Contrariar was formed in Uberlândia, Minas Gerais, in 1989 by singer Alexandre Pires, who was 13 at the time. Pires convinced his brother, cousin, and some friends to form the band for fun. They took the name from a samba by the Carioca group Fundo de Quintal.

They started playing in bars around their hometown. In 1993 they recorded a demo tape and sent it to BMG. The label signed them and that same year, they released their self-titled debut album. This album sold more than 500,000 copies and they started touring heavily.

They kept releasing several albums through the 90s, but their fifth album (released in 1997) helped the group win the triple diamond record for selling 3 million copies.

In 1998, the group recorded their first album in Spanish which sold 700,000 copies. This album garnered them more awards around the world. In 1999, they released their second Spanish album titled Juegos de Amor. The album included a hit song titled "Santo Santo" that featured Cuban singer Gloria Estefan.

== Band members ==
- Alexandre Pires – lead vocals
- Fernando Pires – drums
- Juliano – percussion
- Rogério – Cello
- Serginho – keyboards
- Hamilton – saxophone
- Luiz Fernando – pandeiro
- Alexandre Popó – surdo
- Luis Antônio – Viola, Guitar

== See also ==
- Alexandre Pires
- List of best-selling Latin music artists
