= Bombo (song) =

Single by Adelén
- Released: 30 January 2013
- Recorded: 2013
- Genre: Tropical dance
- Songwriter(s): Ina Wroldsen; Andreas Romdhane; Josef Larossi
- Producer(s): Quiz & Larossi

Adelén singles chronology
"Bombo" (2013)	"Baila Conmigo" (2013)

Music video
- "Bombo" on YouTube

Bombo is a 2013 song performed by Norwegian singer Adelén. It was one of the finalists of Melodi Grand Prix 2013 in a bid to represent Norway in the Eurovision Song Contest 2013 in Malmö, Sweden. It has been described as a tropical dance song.

The song advanced to the Top 10 finals and was chosen as one of four songs for the Gold Final. It eventually finished runner-up, the winner being Margaret Berger and her song "I Feed You My Love". Despite "Bombo" not winning the final nomination, it went straight to number 2 on the Norwegian iTunes chart after her performance, reaching the top of the charts the week after.

It participated in the 2013 OGAE Second Chance Contest and won the competition with 151 points, 29 points over the runner-up, "E se poi" by Malika Ayane.

The track also scored the 2013 Eurodanceweb Award reaching the highest score on the history of the Award as well as the largest distance from the second placed song.

"Bombo" was certified Gold in Sweden.

== Charts ==
Chart (2013)	Peak position
Finland (Suomen virallinen lista)	6
Norway (VG-lista)	1
Poland (Dance Top 50)	36
Sweden (Sverigetopplistan)	23

== Certifications ==
Region	Certification	Certified units/sales
Norway (IFPI Norway)	3× Platinum	30,000^{‡}
Sweden (GLF)	Gold	20,000^{‡}
Streaming
Norway (IFPI Norway)	3× Platinum	9,000,000^{†}
^{‡} Sales+streaming figures based on certification alone.^{†} Streaming-only figures based on certification alone.
