= Adelén =

Norwegian singer

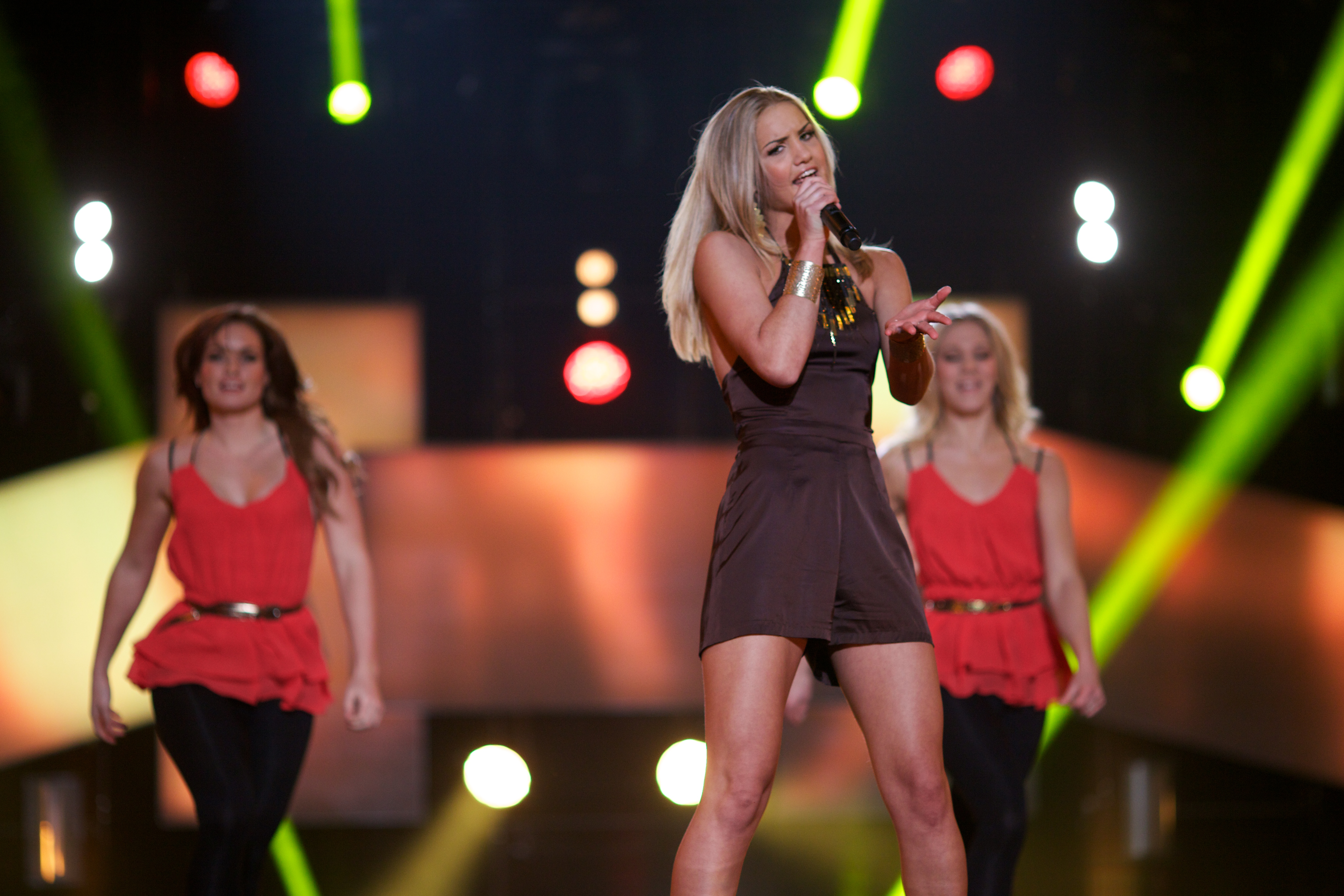
- Adelén, in 2013

Background information
- Born: Adelén Rusillo Steen; 4 November 1996 (age 30); Horten, Norway
- Genres: Pop; dance-pop; Latin pop
- Occupation: Singer
- Instrument: Vocals
- Years active: 2013–present
- Labels: Sony; Eccentric; Universal
- Website: adelenmusic.com

Adelén Rusillo Steen (born 4 November 1996), known professionally as Adelén, is a Spanish-Norwegian singer.

== Career ==
=== 2013–present: Melodi Grand Prix and debut ===
Adelén participated in the Norwegian national selection for the Eurovision Song Contest 2013 in Oslo with the Spanish-influenced song "Bombo", written by Ina Wroldsen and Quiz & Larossi and came in second place.

"Bombo" went straight to number 2 on the Norwegian iTunes chart after her performance. It also appeared in VG-lista, the official Norwegian Singles Chart. The song also won the OGAE Second Chance Contest 2013, becoming Norway's third win, and first since 1993. It also won the 2013 Eurodanceweb Award with the highest score ever achieved in the history of the Award (284 points) and the largest distance from the second placed song (exactly 70 points).

In 2013, she signed with Simon Fuller in an attempt to launch her globally. On 21 June 2013 she released another single called "Baila Conmigo".

In 2014, she recorded "Olé" for the 2014 FIFA World Cup's album One Love, One Rhythm – The 2014 FIFA World Cup Official Album, which went straight to number 1 on the Norwegian iTunes.

In 2015 she released the single "Spell On Me", followed by "Wild Like Me" in 2016. During 2017 two new ones were unveiled; the electropop track "Go Home" and "Big Bad Bitter" with disco influences and an accompanying music video.

In 2018 she left her label eccentric and signed with Sony Music Norway and released "What's Next", which features an ode to her Spanish roots. A collaboration featuring Colombian duo Kapla y Miky called "Beat" and the "catchy number" with a Latin beat "Somewhere We Can Talk" followed on 2019. In 2021 she delivered her comeback single, the emotional pop ballad "Jaded". It was followed by a dance version of the song and the subsequent singles "Safety Light" and "Obssesed".

== Personal life ==
Born to a Spanish mother and Norwegian father, Adelén was raised in Horten, Norway and moved to Oslo.

== Discography ==
=== Singles ===
==== As main artist ====
Year	Single	Peak chart positions				Album
Year	Single	NOR	FIN	POL Dance	SWE	Album
2013	"Bombo"	1	6	36	23	non-album singles
2013	"Baila Conmigo"	—	—	—	—	non-album singles
2014	"Always On My Mind"	—	—	—	—	non-album singles
2014	"Olé"	3	—	50	—	One Love, One Rhythm – The 2014 FIFA World Cup Official Album
2015	"Spell On Me"	—	—	—	—	non-album singles
2016	"Wild Like Me"	—	—	—	—	non-album singles
2017	"Go Home"	—	—	—	—	non-album singles
2017	"Big Bad Bitter"	—	—	—	—	non-album singles
2019	"What's Next"	—	—	—	—	non-album singles
2019	"Beat" (featuring Kapla y Miky)	—	—	—	—	non-album singles
2019	"Somewhere We Can Talk"	—	—	—	—	non-album singles
2021	"Jaded"	—	—	—	—	non-album singles
2021	"Safety Light"	—	—	—	—	non-album singles
2021	"Obsessed"	—	—	—	—	non-album singles
2022	"Mala"	—	—	—	—	non-album singles
"—" denotes single that did not chart

==== As featured artist ====
Year	Single	Peak chart positions				Album
Year	Single	NOR	FIN	POL Dance	SWE	Album
2017	"Worry" (Mileo featuring Adelén)	—	—	—	—	non-album singles
"—" denotes single that did not chart

== Awards and nominations ==
Year	Awards	Category	Work	Outcome
2013	Eurodanceweb Award	Dancing Song of the Year	"Bombo"	Won
2014	MTV Europe Music Awards	Best Norwegian Act	Herself	Won
2014	MTV Europe Music Awards	Best Northern European Act	Herself	Nominated

Preceded by (Spain) Pastora Soler	OGAE Second Chance Contest winner 2013	Succeeded by (Sweden) Helena Paparizou
