= Dar um Jeito (We Will Find a Way) =

Single by Carlos Santana and Wyclef Jean featuring Avicii and Alexandre Pires

from the album One Love, One Rhythm
- Released: April 29, 2014
- Recorded: 2014
- Genre: Latin rock; Samba; EDM
- Length: 3:48
- Label: Sony
- Songwriters: Alexandre Pires; Tim Bergling; Arash Pournouri; Rami Yacoub; Carl Falk; Arnon Woolfson; Diogo Vianna; Wyclef Jean
- Producers: Arash Pournouri; Carl Falk; Rami Yacoub; DJ IuriGC (Remix); Tim Bergling

Carlos Santana singles chronology
"This Boy's Fire" (2008)	"Dar um Jeito (We Will Find a Way)" (2014)

Wyclef Jean singles chronology
"Sweetest Girl (Dollar Bill)" (2007)	"Dar um Jeito (We Will Find a Way)" (2014)	"Divine Sorrow" (2014)

Avicii singles chronology
"Lay Me Down" (2014)	"Dar um Jeito (We Will Find a Way)" (2014)	"The Days" (2014)

Alexandre Pires singles chronology
"Maluca Pirada" (2012)	"Dar um Jeito (We Will Find a Way)" (2014)	"Barraqueira" (2015)

Music video
- "Santana - Dar um Jeito (We Will Find a Way) [Official 2014 FIFA World Cup Anthem]" on YouTube

"Dar um Jeito (We Will Find a Way)" is the official anthem of the 2014 FIFA World Cup held in Brazil performed by Carlos Santana and Wyclef Jean featuring Avicii and Alexandre Pires. The song was executive-produced and co-written by Arnon Woolfson who originated the project. It served as an official anthem for the 2014 FIFA World Cup, with one verse in English and the other in Portuguese, and is included on the album One Love, One Rhythm – The 2014 FIFA World Cup Official Album. The song peaked at number 14 on the US Hot Dance Club Songs chart.

== Charts ==
=== Weekly charts ===
Chart (2014)	Peak position
Belgium (Ultratop 50 Flanders)	16
Belgium (Ultratop 50 Wallonia)	17
Japan (Billboard Japan Hot 100)	82
Netherlands (Dutch Top 40 Tipparade)	17
Spain (Promusicae)	49
US Hot Dance Club Songs (Billboard)	14
