= One Love, One Rhythm – The 2014 FIFA World Cup Official Album =

2014 compilation album by various artists

One Love, One Rhythm

Compilation album by Various artists
- Released: May 8, 2014
- Genres: Latin pop; dance-pop; EDM; Latin house
- Length: 51:26
- Languages: Spanish; English; Portuguese
- Labels: RCA; Sony Music Brasil
- Producers: Adam Comstock; Arlindo Cruz; Ash Pournouri; Berman Brothers; Carl Falk; Carlinhos Brown; Charles Chaves; Cirkut; Dr. Luke; J2; DJ Memê; John James Powell; RedOne; Mario Caldato Jr.; Quiz & Larossi; Salaam Remi; Sérgio Mendes; Rami Yacoub; Robson Nonato; Rock Mafia; Shakira; Tim Bergling; Taku Takahashi; Troyton Rami

FIFA World Cup chronology
Listen Up! (2010)	One Love, One Rhythm (2014)	FIFA World Cup Qatar 2022 Official Soundtrack (2022)

Singles from One Love, One Rhythm
- 1. "We Are One (Ole Ola)" Released: April 8, 2014; 2. "The World Is Ours (Coca-Cola 2014 World’s Cup Anthem)" Released: April 16, 2014; 3. "Vida" Released: April 22, 2014; 4. "Dar um Jeito (We Will Find a Way)" Released: April 29, 2014; 5. "Olé" Released: May 12, 2014; 6. "La La La (Brazil 2014)" Released: May 27, 2014

One Love, One Rhythm – The 2014 FIFA World Cup Official Album is a compilation album that was released on May 8, 2014 through Sony Music Brasil and RCA Records. This album is the official music album of the 2014 FIFA World Cup in Brazil. It features songs written and selected for the 2014 FIFA World Cup in Brazil.

== Information ==
One Love, One Rhythm features work by well-known Brazilian singers, including Arlindo Cruz, performer of "Tatu Bom de Bola", the official mascot song, Sergio Mendes, Bebel Gilberto, and SuperSong finalist Rodrigo Alexey, featuring Preta Gil. Contributions from artists of other nationalities include original songs by 1960s American doo-wop group The Isley Brothers, Norwegian-Spanish pop singer Adelén, Canadian reggae-pop band Magic! and Bahamian Pop/Junkanoo Band Baha Men.

Remixes of the official song and the mascot song by Afro-Brazilian Carnival bloc Olodum and DJ Memê, respectively, are featured as bonus tracks on the deluxe edition of the album. "Fighter", a Japanese track performed by Mika Nakashima and Miliyah Kato, was released as a single in Japan on June 4, 2014. Also featured is "Lepo Lepo", a song by pagode group Psirico which was considered the theme song of the 2014 Brazilian Carnival.

== Singles ==
The first single from One Love, One Rhythm is "We Are One (Ole Ola)", a collaboration between American artists Pitbull and Jennifer Lopez and Brazilian axé singer Claudia Leitte. It was released on April 8, 2014 and served as the tournament's official theme song. The second single is "The World Is Ours," performed by Brazilian-American singer David Correy and American singer Aloe Blacc, credited to Aloe Blacc x David Correy, was released on April 16, 2014, it serves as the official Coca-Cola anthem for the 2014 World Cup and retitled "The World Is Ours (Coca-Cola 2014 World's Cup Anthem),". The track is a mashup of "The World Is Ours" by David Correy featuring Brazilian band Monobloco and "Hello World" by Aloe Blacc. The third single is "Vida", a bilingual English and Spanish song recorded by Ricky Martin as a result of SuperSong, an online music contest held by Sony Corporation. The song was released on April 22, 2014. Voters chose "Vida" by American singer-songwriter Elijah King as their favorite song.

Fourth single "Dar um Jeito (We Will Find a Way)", performed by Carlos Santana and Wyclef Jean featuring Avicii and Alexandre Pires, served as the World Cup's official anthem. It was released on April 29, 2014. Fifth single, "Olé", performed by Adelén, was released on May 12, 2014. "La La La (Brazil 2014)" was officially sent to radio stations in Italy on May 27, 2014 as the sixth overall single from the album.

== Track listing ==
No.	Title	Writer(s)	Performer(s)	Length
1.	"We Are One (Ole Ola)" (The Official 2014 FIFA World Cup Song)	Jennifer Lopez; Claudia Leitte; Armando C. Perez; Thomas Troelsen; Daniel Murcia; Sia Furler; Lukasz Gottwald; Henry Walter; Nadir Khayat	Pitbull featuring Jennifer Lopez and Claudia Leitte	3:43
2.	"Dar um Jeito (We Will Find a Way)" (The Official 2014 FIFA World Cup Anthem)	Alexandre Pires; Arash Pournouri; Rami Yacoub; Carl Falk; Tim Bergling; Arnon Woolfson; Diogo Vianna; Wyclef Jean	Santana and Wyclef Jean featuring Avicii and Alexandre Pires	3:48
3.	"Tatu Bom de Bola" (The Official 2014 FIFA Mascot Song)	Arlindo Neto; Roge; Arlindo Cruz	Arlindo Cruz	3:20
4.	"Vida" (Spanglish version)	Enrique Martin; Salaam Remi; Elijah King	Ricky Martin featuring Judika and Alif Satar	3:25
5.	"The World Is Ours" (Coca-Cola 2014 World's Cup Anthem)	Adam Schmalholz; Aloe Blacc; Antonina Armato; Tim James	Aloe Blacc x David Correy	2:54
6.	"Lepo Lepo"	Filipe Escandurras, Magno Santanna	Psirico	3:21
7.	"One Nation"	Sergio Mendes; Carlinhos Brown; John James Powell	Sergio Mendes	3:32
8.	"La La La (Brazil 2014)"	Shakira; Jay Singh; Brown; Gottwald; Mathieu Jomphe-Lepine; Max Martin; Walter; Raelene Arreguin; John J Conte, Jr.	Shakira featuring Carlinhos Brown	3:17
9.	"It's Your Thing"	Ronald Isley; O' Kelly Isley; Rudolph Isley	The Isley Brothers with Studio Rio	3:07
10.	"Tico Tico"	Zequinha Abreu	Bebel Gilberto and Lang Lang	2:48
11.	"Olé" (Stadium Anthem Mix)	Ina Wroldsen; Andreas Romdhane; Josef Larossi	Adelén	3:20
12.	"This Is Our Time (Agora É a Nossa Hora)"	Nasri Atweh; Mark Pellizzer; Nolan Lambroza; Alex Tanasijczuk	Magic!	3:08
13.	"Night and Day" (Carnival Mix)	Troy Rami•Troy Murray; Anthony Flowers; Patrick Carey; Dyson Knight; Isaiah Taylor; Dwight Yearwood	Baha Men	3:54
14.	"Go, Gol"	Rodrigo Alexey; Wagner Netto; Cesar Lemos	Rodrigo Alexey featuring Preta Gil	2:58
15.	"Fighter" (Tachytelic World Cup Brazil 2014 Remix)	Mika Nakashima; Miliyah Kato; Taku Takahashi	Mika Nakashima x Miliyah Kato	4:51
Total length:				51:26

Deluxe edition bonus tracks
No.	Title	Writer(s)	Performer(s)	Length
16.	"We Are One (Ole Ola)" (The Official 2014 FIFA World Cup Song) (Olodum Mix)	Lopez; Leitte; Perez; Troelsen; Murcia; Furler; Gottwald; Walter; Khayat	Pitbull featuring Jennifer Lopez and Claudia Leitte	3:58
17.	"Tatu Bom de Bola" (The Official 2014 FIFA Mascot Song) (DJ Memê Remix)	Cruz, Rogê; Neto	Arlindo Cruz	3:45
Total length:				60:02

International bonus track
No.	Title	Writer(s)	Performer(s)	Length
17.	"Pasión Total" (FIFA U-17 Women's World Cup Official Song)	Michel Zitron; Didrik Thott; Johan 'Jones' Wetterberg	F.A.N.S.	3:43

== Charts ==
=== Weekly charts ===
Chart (2014)	Peak position
Argentine Albums (CAPIF)	1
Australian Compilation Albums (ARIA)	11
Austrian Albums (Ö3 Austria)	11
Belgian Albums (Ultratop Flanders)	3
Belgian Albums (Ultratop Wallonia)	17
Finnish Albums (Suomen virallinen lista)	23
French Albums (SNEP)	36
German Compilation Albums (Offizielle Top 100)	11
Italian Compilation Albums (FIMI)	6
Japanese Albums (Oricon)	48
Swiss Albums (Schweizer Hitparade)	4
US Billboard 200	45
US World Albums (Billboard)	1

=== Year-end charts ===
Chart (2014)	Position
Belgian Albums (Ultratop Flanders)	93

== See also ==
- List of FIFA World Cup songs and anthems
