= Hush Hush (the Pussycat Dolls song) =

2009 song by the Pussycat Dolls

Song by The Pussycat Dolls

from the album Doll Domination
- Published: September 19, 2008
- Studio: Boiler Room (Santa Monica); Henson (Los Angeles); Quiz & Larossi (Stockholm)
- Genre: Pop
- Length: 3:48
- Label: Interscope
- Songwriters: Andreas Romdhane; Josef Larossi; Ina Wroldsen; Nicole Scherzinger
- Producers: Quiz & Larossi; Ron Fair

Audio video
- "Hush Hush" on YouTube

"Hush Hush" is a song recorded by American girl group the Pussycat Dolls for their second studio album Doll Domination (2008). It was written by its producers Quiz & Larossi, alongside Ina Wroldsen and the Pussycat Dolls' lead singer Nicole Scherzinger. Originally recorded as a ballad, the song was later remixed into an uptempo disco-influenced recording titled "Hush Hush; Hush Hush", interpolating Gloria Gaynor's "I Will Survive". The remix was released as the sixth and final single from Doll Domination on May 12, 2009, by Interscope Records.

On release, "Hush Hush; Hush Hush" received mixed reviews from music critics. Commercially, the remix reached number one in the Czech Republic and Hungary, while the original recording reached the top three in Brazil and Russia. In the US, the remix peaked at number 73 on the Billboard Hot 100 and became the group's sixth consecutive Dance Club Songs number one. The song's accompanying music video, directed by Rich Lee, is set in a dollhouse with themed rooms, featuring stylistic references to 1980s disco and artists such as Donna Summer and Diana Ross.

The release of "Hush Hush; Hush Hush" as a single elicited controversy after Scherzinger was credited as a featured artist, following a similar billing on their previous single "Jai Ho! (You Are My Destiny)", which caused tension within the group and a public outburst by member Melody Thornton. While Scherzinger defended her billing, Interscope eventually removed her featured status prior to the single's release.

== Background and composition ==
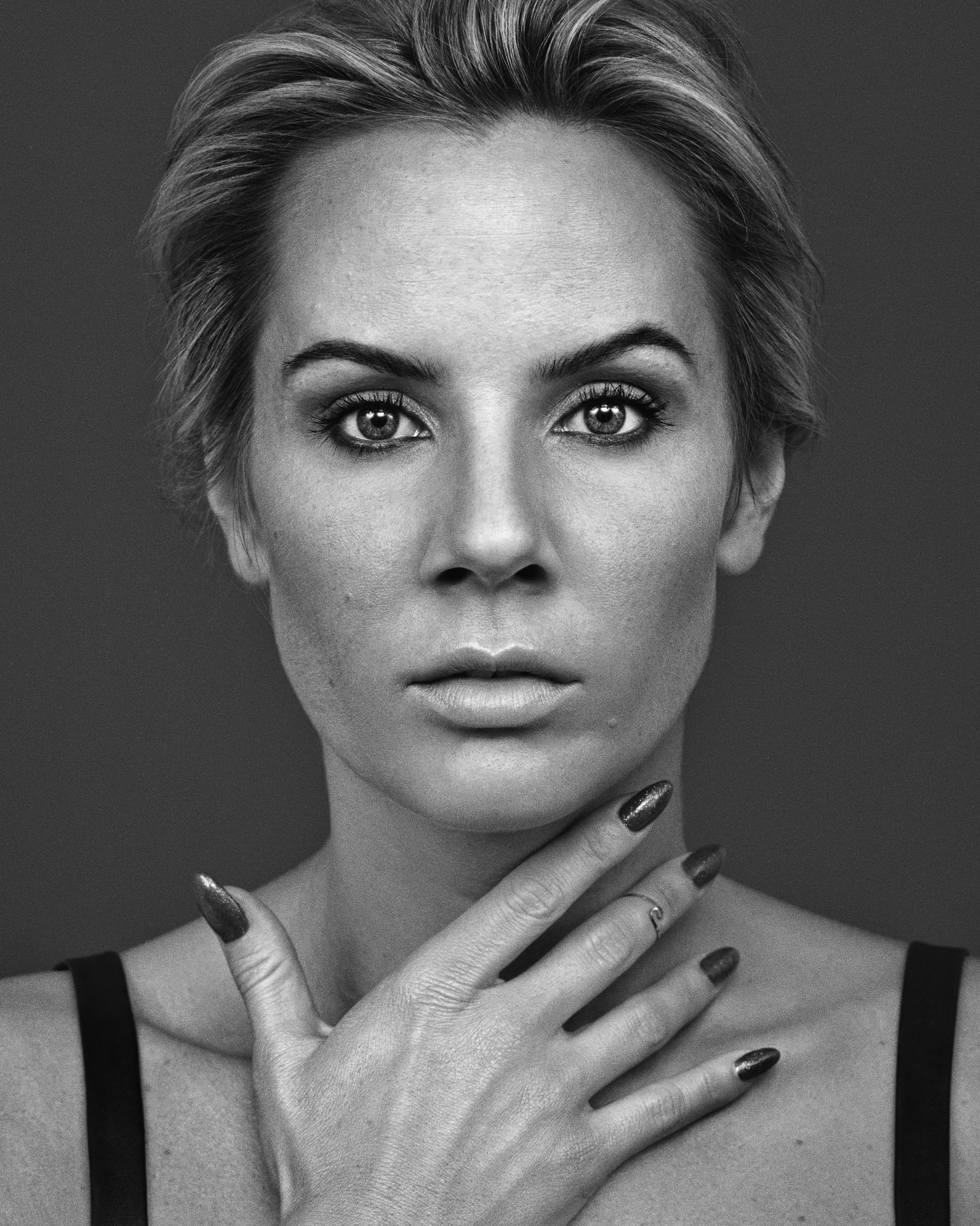
"Hush Hush" was first written by Ina Wroldsen (pictured).

"Hush Hush" was originally written by Norwegian songwriter Ina Wroldsen for the Pussycat Dolls. She delivered a demo of the track, but once album's producer Ron Fair and others, and others worked on it in the studio, the song was heavily reworked to the point that Wroldsen barely recognized it. Fair, took special interest in the track, spending 11 days and significant resources trying to shape it into a finished single. Lead singer Nicole Scherzinger was later given co-writing credit due to her strong input on the lyrics and recording. Wroldsen felt the final version had strayed far from her original vision. Reflecting on it, she accepted it as part of the industry reality—songwriters often lose creative control when bigger artists and labels adapt their material.

Swedish production duo Quiz & Larossi (Andreas Romdhane and Josef Larossi), where also credited as the song's producer and writers. It was recorded by Mike "Angry" Eleopoulos and Tal Herzberg with the assistance of Greg DePante, Steve Genewick, and Keith Gretlein and mixed by Dave Pensado, Jaycen Joshua, and Andrew Wuepper at Quiz & Larossi Studios in Stockholm, Sweden, The Boiler Room in Santa Monica, California, as well as the Henson Studios in Los Angeles. Fair arranged and conducted the strings, which were recorded by Frank Wolf. Other instrumentation and programming was carried out by Quiz & Larossi. The song was included on the Pussycat Dolls' second studio album Doll Domination, released in September 2008.

"Hush Hush" is a pop song. Running for three minutes and 48 seconds, the ballad was described to having "down tempo forlornness". The song portrays the group as strong, independent women who do not depend on men for help.

== Credits and personnel ==
Credits are adapted from the liner notes of Doll Domination and Doll Domination – The Mini Collection.

Recording

- Recorded at Quiz & Larossi Studios (Stockholm, Sweden), The Boiler Room (Santa Monica, California), and the Henson Studios in (Los Angeles, California).

Sample

- Contains a sample of "I Will Survive", performed by Gloria Gaynor, as written by Freddie Perren and Dino Fekaris and an interpolation of the original string arrangement by David Blumberg. (Note: Remix only)

Personnel

- Greg DePante (Note: Original only) – assistant engineer
- Eric Eyland – assistant engineer
- Dave Audé – production, programming
- Bruce Dukov – concertmaster
- Greg DePante – assistant engineer
- Mike "Angry" Eleopoulos – recording
- Ron Fair – production, vocal production, vocal arrangement, strings arrangement and conduct, keyboards
- Steve Genewick – assistant engineer
- Keith Gretlein – assistant engineer
- Tal Herzberg – Pro Tools, recording
- Jaycen Joshua – mixing
- Josef Larossi – songwriting, production, recording
- Gayle Levant – harp
- Peter Mokran – mixing
- Johnathan Merritt – assistant engineer
- Danny Ponce – recording
- Dave Pensado – mixing
- Andreas Romdhane – songwriting, production, instruments, programming, recording
- Nicole Scherzinger – songwriting, vocal production, vocal arrangement
- Ryan Shanahan – assistant engineer
- Tommy Vicari – strings recording
- Eric Weaver – assistant engineer
- Frank Wolf – strings recording
- Ina Wroldsen – songwriter
- Andrew Wuepper – assistant engineer

== Charts ==
=== Weekly charts ===
2009 weekly chart performance
Chart	Peak position
Brazil (Crowley)	3
CIS Airplay (TopHit)	2
Russia Airplay (TopHit)	2

=== Year-end charts ===
2008 year-end chart performance
Chart	Position
CIS Airplay (TopHit)	120
Russia Airplay (TopHit)	129

2009 year-end chart performance
Chart	Position
CIS Airplay (TopHit)	43
Russia Airplay (TopHit)	39

=== Decade-end charts ===
2000s decade-end chart performance
Chart	Position
CIS Airplay (TopHit)	71
Russia Airplay (TopHit)	88

== Remix ==
"Hush Hush; Hush Hush"

Single by The Pussycat Dolls

from the album Doll Domination – The Mini Collection
- B-side: "Hush Hush"
- Released: May 12, 2009
- Genre: Disco; house
- Length: 4:01
- Label: Interscope
- Songwriters: Andreas Romdhane; Josef Larossi; Ina Wroldsen; Nicole Scherzinger; Freddie Perren; Dino Fekaris
- Producers: Dave Audé; Quiz & Larossi; Ron Fair

The Pussycat Dolls singles chronology
"Jai Ho! (You Are My Destiny)" (2009)	"Hush Hush; Hush Hush" (2009)	"React" (2020)

Music video
- "Hush Hush; Hush Hush" on YouTube

=== Background ===
In March 2009, Scherzinger confirmed Doll Domination would be reissued, following stagnant sales of the album. The reissues includes some previously released singles and three new songs including "Hush Hush; Hush Hush", a remixed version of the original song. Dave Audé was added as producer, while Freddie Perren and Dino Fekaris received co-writing credits for containing interpolations of Gloria Gaynor's "I Will Survive" (1978) and includes a quotation of the original string arrangement by David Blumberg. The string arrangement was carried out by Bruce Dukov, with Tommy Vicari handling strings recording. Additionally, the production team included Eric Eyland, Steve Genewick, Keith Gretlein, Ryan Shanahan, and Eric Weaver as assistant engineers. Gayle Levant contributed harp, and Peter Mokran was responsible for mixing. The remix keeps the original production of "Hush Hush" until the one-minute mark. Just before the first chorus, a crash cymbal introduces a transition into a house remix. The remix was first performed by Scherzinger on the group's Doll Domination Tour, in the solo section dedicated to individual member performances.

=== Release and controversy ===
Retailers had listed "Hush Hush; Hush Hush" for pre-order a week before its original April 28, 2009 digital release. The cover art listed Scherzinger as a featured artist, just like their previous single, "Jai Ho! (You Are My Destiny)". Scherzinger's billing as a featured artist led to dissatisfaction with other members while publications reported that her exit from the group was imminent. While opening for The Circus Starring Britney Spears (2009) in Glendale, Arizona, member Melody Thornton addressed the crowd during their break saying, "[...] let me give a shout-out to my family. Thank you for supporting me, even if I'm not featured" referring to the billing of the singles, and encouraging the audience to follow their dreams and to "never let anyone stomp on them, ever." Scherzinger later spoke about her billing as a featured artist during a radio interview: "It's no big deal, that doesn't take away from anybody else in the group. That's my role. I wrote 'Hush Hush' as well." The label ultimately removed Scherzinger's featured status and delayed the digital release to May 12, 2009.

=== Reception ===
In a review for "Hush Hush; Hush Hush", David Balls of Digital Spy lamented for its lack of energetic R&B quality that made their previous singles successful. Balls went to imply that its disco sound was outdated and criticized the sample for failing to enhance the track. He awarded the song two out of five stars. While reviewing The Mini Collection, Nick Levine from the same publication found the remix to be absurd but did feel the sample to be effective. Nick Bond of MTV Australia suggested the remix is not compatible with the original ballad.

Commercially, "Hush Hush; Hush Hush" peaked at number one in the Czech Republic and Hungary. It reached the top 10 in Australia, Belgium, Brazil, Croatia, Finland, France, Israel, and Slovakia. In the UK, the remix peaked at number 17, becoming their tenth consecutive top-20 hit. It was a commercial failure in the Pussycat Dolls' native US, reaching number 73 on the Billboard Hot 100, but became their sixth consecutive Dance Club Songs number one. The achievement matched the previous record held by Rihanna, who reached number one with her first seven entries between 2005 and 2007.

=== Music video ===
Scherzinger scene in the bathtub was compared to Cindy Crawford's scene in George Michael's video for "Freedom! '90" (1990).

Rich Lee directed the music video for "Hush Hush; Hush Hush". It premiered on May 26, 2009. It is set in a dollhouse, where each room has a different theme. It opens with Scherzinger lounging in a bathtub. Afterwards, she moves to a room full of stairs in different directions, where she is joined by her fellow members, Jessica Sutta, Ashley Roberts, Thornton, and Kimberly Wyatt. The video continues with two parties; in the first one, the group is seen rollerskating while the second party is set by the pool and perform choreography. Former Pussycat Dolls member Carmen Electra and blogger Perez Hilton cameo in the scene. Hilton is wearing a t-shirt which reads, "Hush Hush featuring Perez." Then, the video fades to black and opens with an upclose shot of Scherzinger who is in front of a disco mirror ball. She is wearing a metallic mini dress. Her look pays homage to Donna Summer and Diana Ross. Other scenes include a disco scene paying homage to the 1980s music, and Roberts and Wyatt swinging on chandeliers.

Levine from Digital Spy found the video over-the-top. Melinda Newman of HitFix found the video entertaining while noted Scherzinger's dominance and sidelining the other members to background roles.

=== Formats and track listings ===
Digital single

1. "Hush Hush; Hush Hush" – 4:12

French CD single

1. "Hush Hush; Hush Hush" – 4:12
2. "Hush Hush; Hush Hush" (The Bimbo Jones Radio Remix) – 4:00
3. "Hush Hush" (original version) – 3:48

=== Charts ===
==== Weekly charts ====
2009–2017 weekly chart performance
Chart	Peak position
Australia (ARIA)	10
Austria (Ö3 Austria Top 40)	35
Belgium (Ultratop 50 Flanders)	6
Belgium (Ultratop 50 Wallonia)	4
Canada Hot 100 (Billboard)	41
Canada Hot AC (Billboard)	42
Croatia International Airplay (HRT)	10
Czech Republic Airplay (ČNS IFPI)	1
Denmark (Tracklisten)	38
Finland (Suomen virallinen lista)	3
France (SNEP)	5
Germany (GfK)	44
Hungary (Rádiós Top 40)	1
Hungary (Dance Top 40)	2
Hungary (Single Top 40)	3
Ireland (IRMA)	13
Israel International Airplay (Media Forest)	4
Luxembourg Digital Song Sales (Billboard)	24
Poland Airplay (ZPAV)	53
Slovakia Airplay (ČNS IFPI)	4
Switzerland (Schweizer Hitparade)	30
UK Singles (Official Charts)	17
UK Hip Hop/R&B (Official Charts)	5
US Billboard Hot 100	73
US Dance Club Songs (Billboard)	1
US Pop Airplay (Billboard)	28

==== Monthly charts ====
2009 monthly chart performance
Chart	Peak position
Brazil (Brasil Hot 100 Airplay)	3
Brazil (Brasil Hot Pop Songs)	2

==== Year-end charts ====
2009 year-end chart performance
Chart	Position
Australia (ARIA)	74
Australia Dance (ARIA)	29
Belgium (Ultratop 50 Flanders)	53
Belgium (Ultratop 50 Wallonia)	43
Brazil (Crowley)	7
Croatia (HRT)	27
European Hot 100 Singles (Billboard)	61
France (SNEP)	45
Hungary (Dance Top 40)	23
Hungary (Rádiós Top 40)	43
UK Singles (OCC)	112
US Dance Club Songs (Billboard)	10

2010 year-end chart performance
Chart	Position
Hungary (Dance Top 40)	22
Hungary (Rádiós Top 40)	19

2022 year-end chart performance
Chart	Position
Hungary (Rádiós Top 40)	93

=== Certifications ===
Certifications and sales
Region	Certification	Certified units/sales
Australia (ARIA)	Gold	35,000^{^}
Brazil (Pro-Música Brasil)	Gold	30,000^{‡}
United Kingdom (BPI)	Silver	200,000^{‡}
^{^} Shipments figures based on certification alone.^{‡} Sales+streaming figures based on certification alone.

=== Release history ===
Release dates and formats
Region	Date	Format(s)	Label(s)	Ref.
Various	May 12, 2009	Digital download	Interscope	
United States	May 26, 2009	Contemporary hit radio	Interscope	
Australia	June 5, 2009	Digital download	Universal	
Germany	August 14, 2009	CD	Universal	
France	September 14, 2009	CD	Polydor	

== See also ==
- List of number-one dance singles of 2009 (U.S.)
- List of number-one singles of the 2010s (Hungary)
