= Cradle (song) =

2005 single by Atomic Kitten

"Cradle 2005"

Single by Atomic Kitten

from the album The Greatest Hits
- Released: 14 February 2005
- Studio: Motor Museum (Liverpool, England)
- Length: 3:58
- Label: Innocent; Virgin
- Songwriters: Stuart Kershaw; Andy McCluskey; Peter Strudwick
- Producers: Quiz & Larossi; Jeremy Wheatley

Atomic Kitten singles chronology
"Someone like Me" / "Right Now 2004" (2004)	"Cradle 2005" (2005)	"All Together Now" (2006)

Music video
- "Cradle" on YouTube

"Cradle 2005" is a song recorded by English girl group Atomic Kitten from their compilation The Greatest Hits. It was written by Atomic Kitten co-founders Andy McCluskey and Stuart Kershaw (of the band OMD), along with Peter Strudwick. The track was released as a single on 14 February 2005, in aid of World Vision, a year after the group's announcement of their split in 2004. It reached number 10 on the UK Singles Chart and number 46 in Ireland.

== Versions ==
"Cradle 2005" is a partially re-recorded version of a song that was previously included on their debut album, Right Now (2000). While the demo version of "Cradle", produced by Simon Franglen, appeared on the album's early 2000 Japanese release, a slightly faster recording, produced by Quiz & Larossi, appeared on the album's late 2000 UK release. The song was originally led entirely by group member Natasha Hamilton; "Cradle 2005" was re-recorded to include additional lead vocals from Jenny Frost and Liz McClarnon for the charity release and remixed by Jeremy Wheatley.

== Music videos ==
The original 2000 video features Natasha Hamilton, Liz McClarnon and Kerry Katona behind a plain white and black background. The 2005 version of the video is a montage of Atomic Kitten's career and includes footage of McClarnon and Jenny Frost visiting Africa in November 2004 for the charity fundraiser. Hamilton was unable to visit due to being heavily pregnant with her second child. Footage from the original 2000 video (with Katona edited out) and the Belfast live performance during the group's 2002 Right Here, Right Now Tour, as well as clips of the US version of the "Whole Again" video, are shown throughout.

== Track listings ==
UK CD single
No.	Title	Writer(s)	Producer(s)	Length
1.	"Cradle"	Stuart Kershaw; Andy McCluskey; Peter Strudwick	Quiz & Larossi; Jeremy Wheatley^{[a]}	3:47
2.	"Eternal Flame"	Billy Steinberg; Tom Kelly; Susanna Hoffs	Ray Ruffin	3:15
3.	"Someone like Me" (Minus Blue mix)	Ciaron Bell; Liz McClarnon	Bell; Minus Blue^{[a]}	4:20
4.	"Cradle 2005" (video)			3:48

Notes

- ^{^[a]} denotes additional producer

== Charts ==
Chart (2005)	Peak position
Ireland (IRMA)	46
Scottish Singles Sales (Official Charts)	12
UK Singles (Official Charts)	10
UK Airplay (Music Week)	27
