= Gino Vanelli =

Italian opera singer (1896–1969)

- Vanelli (photo with 1957 dedication)
- Born: 26 March 1896; Bergamo, Italy
- Died: 9 April 1969 (aged 73); Monza, Italy
- Occupation: Opera singer (baritone)
- Years active: 1917–1955

Gino Vanelli (26 March 1896, in Bergamo – 9 April 1969, in Monza) was an Italian operatic baritone who had an active international career from 1917 until his retirement in 1955. He made several recordings for His Master's Voice and Columbia Records, including complete recordings of the operas La boheme, Pagliacci, and Madama Butterfly.

== Life and career ==
Born in Bergamo on 26 March 1896, Vanelli studied at the Donizetti Conservatory in his native city and with Dante Lari in Milan. He made his professional opera debut in Bergamo in 1917 as Perichaud in Giacomo Puccini's La Rondine at the Teatro Donizetti. In 1919, he portrayed Barone Douphol in Giuseppe Verdi's La traviata and the Count di Luna in Verdi's Il trovatore at the Teatro Olimpia in Bassano del Grappa. In 1920, he sang the role of Don Carlos in Verdi's La forza del destino in Lodi and the role of Lescaut in Puccini's Manon Lescaut at the Teatro Sociale in Casalmonferrato. He returned to Lodi soon after to sing the roles of Count di Luna and Giannotto in Pietro Mascagni's Lodoletta.

In 1921, Vanelli portrayed Hermann in Alfredo Catalani's Loreley at the Teatro Comunale in Forli, and in 1922, he sang Sharpless in Puccini's Madama Butterfly at the Politeama Verdi in Cremona. In 1923, he performed the role of Tonio in Ruggero Leoncavallo's Pagliacci at the Teatro all'Aperto in L'Aquila. In 1924, he toured Egypt, where he appeared at the Cairo Opera House and at the Teatro Alhambra of Alessandria in ‘’Lucia di Lammermoor’’ as Lord Enrico Ashton. That same year, he toured Brazil. In 1925, he performed at the Teatro Real in Madrid and appeared as Marcello in Puccini's La bohème at the Teatro Principal in Palma di Majorca.

In 1926, Vanelli made his debut at the Teatro Costanzi in Rome as Escamillo in Carmen with Maria Gay in the title role. That same year, he made his debut at La Scala in Milan as Ping in Puccini's Turandot. He remained committed to La Scala as a resident artist for the next 20 years. From 1926-1928, he made numerous appearances at the Teatro Colón in Buenos Aires, including starring roles in the world premieres of Rafael Peacan del Sar's Chrysantheme (1927) and Raúl Espoile's Frenos (1928). Other operas he sang in Buenos Aires were Turandot, Ildebrando Pizzetti's Fra Gherardo, Felice Lattuada's "Le preziose ridicole", and Ottorino Respighi's La campana sommersa.

In 1932, Vanelli appeared in the world premiere of Alfredo Casella's La donna serpente at the Teatro dell'Opera di Roma. He returned there in 1934 to perform in the world premiere of Licinio Refice's Cecilia. In 1935 and 1941, he toured in Holland, and in 1951, he appeared at the Arena di Verona Festival. In 1952, he portrayed Belcore in Donizetti's L'elisir d'amore at the Wexford Festival Opera. In 1954, he performed in the world premiere of Giulio Viozzi's Allamistakeo at the Teatro delle Novità in Bergamo; a role which he subsequently performed in Venice. His last appearance was as Alessio in Vincenzo Bellini's La Sonnambula at the Teatro Donizetti in Bergamo in October 1955. Other opera houses he appeared at during his career included La Fenice, Teatro Carlo Felice, Teatro Comunale di Bologna, the Teatro Municipal in Rio de Janeiro, the Theatro Municipal in São Paulo, the Teatro Regio in Parma, and the Teatro Regio in Turin.
