= Eurodanceweb Award =

Electronic dance music competition

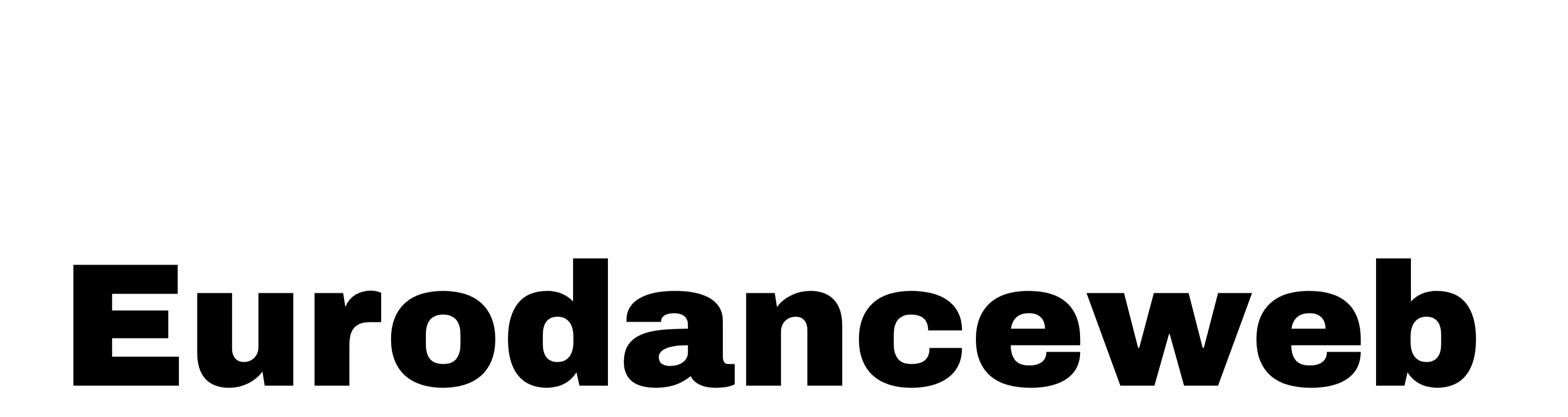
- Logo for the Eurodanceweb Award
- Awarded for: Most interesting dance music track in european music industry
- Country: Europe
- Presented by: On web
- First award: 2001
- Final award: 2014
- Website: eurodanceweb.altervista.org

Television/radio coverage
- Network: official website (2001–2015

The Eurodanceweb Award is an online competition dedicated to dance music, created in 2001 by an idea of a group of Italian and Maltese disc jockeys. Main purpose of this project is the promotion of dance songs from all over Europe and the Mediterranean Basin, with strong links to their national language and culture.

Every year, after monitoring the international record market, the editors of the website Eurodanceweb.com choose the most interesting dance track for each European country. The selected entries are then voted by a professional jury of disc jockeys, journalists, productors, radio speakers and webmasters of popular websites and music blogs.

The winner of this voting achieves the Eurodanceweb Award, a prestigious recognition which has become an important promotional channel worldwide.

Since 2007 also the readers of the official website of this competition can choose their favourite song, by voting on an online poll.

In January 2015, after they announce 2014 winner Kate Ryan, Eurodanceweb Award become inactive and no announcements for future awards.

== Winners ==
Year	Country	Artist	Song
2001	Croatia	Colonia	"Za Tvoje Snene Oči"
2002	Slovenia	Karmen Stavec	"Še in Še"
2003	Belgium	Jessy	"Regardez-moi"
2004	Bulgaria	Malina	"Leden Svyat"
2005	Belarus	Natalia Podolskaya	"Pozdno" (Trance Remix)
2006	Sweden	Basshunter	"Boten Anna"
2007	United Kingdom	Ultrabeat vs. Darren Styles	"Sure Feels Good"
2008	Germany	Alex C feat. Y-Ass	"Doktorspiele"
2009	France	Angie Be	"Soundwaves"
2010	Romania	Inna	"Sun Is Up"
2011	Netherlands	Clokx	"Time of My Life"
2012	Belgium	Milk Inc.	"Miracle"
2013	Norway	Adelén	"Bombo"
2014	Belgium	Kate Ryan	"Not Alone"
