= We Are One (Ole Ola) =

Single by Pitbull featuring Jennifer Lopez and Claudia Leitte

from the album One Love, One Rhythm
- Released: April 8, 2014
- Studio: Al Burna's Extreme Mobile Recording Studio; eightysevenfourteen Studios (Los Angeles, CA); Luke's in the Boo (Malibu, CA); Miami Lights Studio (Miami, FL); Delta Lab Studios (Copenhagen)
- Genre: Latin pop; samba-reggae; dance-pop
- Length: 3:43
- Label: Mr. 305; Polo Grounds; RCA
- Songwriters: Armando C. Perez; Thomas Troelsen; Jennifer Lopez; Claudia Leitte; Daniel Murcia; Sia Furler; Nadir Khayat; Lukasz Gottwald; Henry Walter
- Producers: RedOne; Dr. Luke; Cirkut; Thomas Troelsen

Pitbull singles chronology
"Can't Get Enough" (2014)	"We Are One (Ole Ola)" (2014)	"Drink to That All Night (remix)" (2014)

Jennifer Lopez singles chronology
"I Luh Ya Papi" (2014)	"We Are One (Ole Ola)" (2014)	"First Love" (2014)

Claudia Leitte singles chronology
"Claudinha Bagunceira" (2014)	"We Are One (Ole Ola)" (2014)	"Matimba" (2014)

Music video
- "We Are One (Ole Ola)" on YouTube

"We Are One (Ole Ola)" is a song recorded by Cuban-American rapper Pitbull for One Love, One Rhythm – The 2014 FIFA World Cup Official Album (2014). It is the official song of the 2014 FIFA World Cup held in Brazil and features guest vocals from American singer Jennifer Lopez and Brazilian singer Claudia Leitte. The artists co-wrote the song with Sia, RedOne, Danny Mercer, Dr. Luke, Cirkut, and Thomas Troelsen; the latter three are also the producers.

While receiving positive reviews from critics, initially the song received some negative reactions from Brazilians over its lack of Brazilian feeling. To change that, another version was also released and the music changed slightly to fit Afro Brazilian group Olodum's style of drumming – that version being the one that was used in the music video for the song. "We Are One" has experienced commercial success, reaching the top spot in Belgium and Hungary, top 10 in several countries including Austria, France, Germany, Italy, Spain, and World Cup's host country, Brazil and top twenty in Denmark and Norway. The song peaked at number one in three countries.

== Background and release ==
According to one of the co-writers of "We Are One (Ole Ola), Thomas Troelsen, he pitched a demo version "that had a sort of whistle thing in it" to Pitbull. On January 22, 2014, FIFA and Sony Music Entertainment announced that "We Are One (Ole Ola)" would serve as the official song of the 2014 FIFA World Cup. At the occasion, Pitbull said, "I'm honored to join Jennifer Lopez and Claudia Leitte at the FIFA World Cup to bring the world together. I truly believe that this great game and the power of music will help unify us because we are best when we are one." Lopez said Pitbull asked her to join the song: "I can't take credit for this. This was one of Pitbull's call-ins. He had this record, and he's like, 'I think this record could be great for the World Cup. He's like, 'Will you do it with me?' And I go, 'Yeah, of course.'" A solo version of the song featuring only Pitbull leaked online on February 2. On April 8, Pitbull tweeted an iTunes Store link to the track, debuting the song.

== Critical response ==
The song received generally lukewarm reviews. Carl Williott of Idolator opined that there is too much of Pitbull in the song, and not enough Lopez or Leitte. He, however, stated that the song is an upgrade from Shakira's "Waka Waka (This Time for Africa)", the official song of the 2010 FIFA World Cup. Fuse.tv wrote that, similarly to "Waka Waka", the song "blends the feel of the tournament's hosting country with an accessible, exciting pop sound that has instant repeat appeal". Judy Cantor-Navas of Billboard described the song as "surprisingly breezy", with Spin noting it to contain the "rah-rah international unity you'd expect for a Cup song". Luís Antônio Giron of Época criticized the album saying "maybe I'm wrong and Brazil only crave to be the same as what FIFA wants it to be. Brazil is fifalized". And praised music produced in Miami, "bomb on any track."

The song received some criticism from Brazilian and football fans over its tone and lyrics, particularly with the lyrics and video being labeled as a "big pile of clichés" and its failure to pay homage to Brazil's own rich musical heritage. Such criticism has pointed out the small amount of actual Portuguese lyrics involved, and critics stating their confusion to why "were Cuban-American rapper Pitbull and Bronx-born Puerto Rican singer Jennifer Lopez were chosen for the song, when there are so many other great musicians in the land of bossa nova", as well as its "reinforcement of stereotypes with smiling, barefoot children and semi-naked, samba-dancing women".

== Music video ==
In February 2014, Pitbull, Leitte and Lopez shot the music video for "We Are One (Ole Ola)" with Olodum in Fort Lauderdale, Florida, United States. Its concept was to simulate Carnival in its home country Brazil with the Olodum mix of the song being used as the soundtrack. It was released on May 16, 2014. As of November 2025, the video has received over 1 billion views.

== Live performances ==
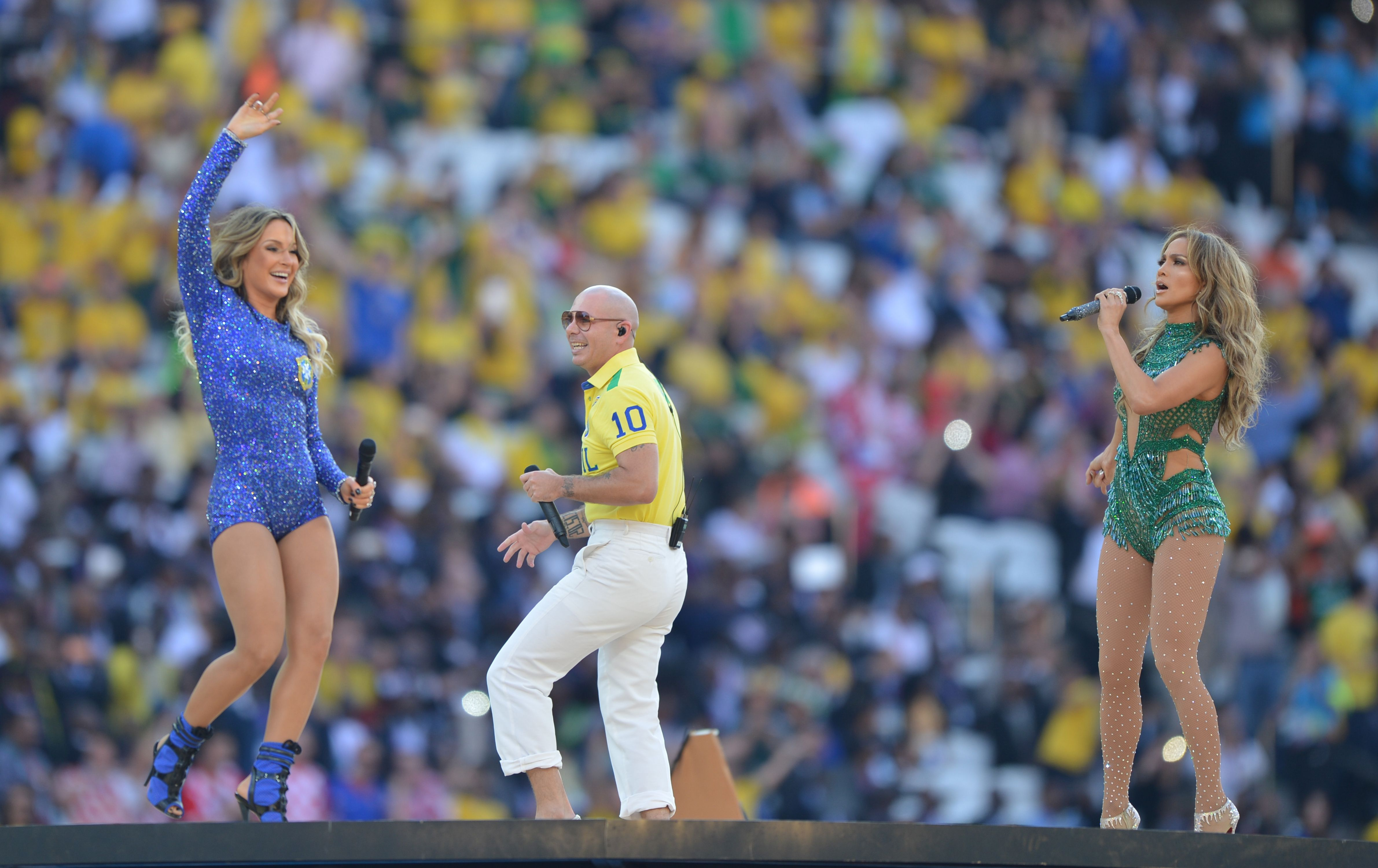
Pitbull, Leitte and Lopez performing "We Are One" at the 2014 FIFA World Cup opening ceremony

Pitbull, Lopez and Leitte performed "We Are One (Ole Ola)" at the 2014 Billboard Music Awards on May 18, 2014. They also performed the song at the 2014 FIFA World Cup opening ceremony on June 12 in Arena Corinthians, São Paulo, prior to the Brazil v. Croatia match, preceded by Leitte's solo rendition of Ary Barroso's classic "Aquarela do Brasil". However, due to the amount of noise made by dancers and poor quality stadium acoustics, some spectators had difficulty hearing the vocals.

In 2023, Pitbull, Lopez and Leitte performed "We Are One (Ole Ola)" at the Miss Universe 2023 in El Salvador during the opening number of the contestants with the floral Swimsuits on November 18, 2023 and Miss Earth 2023 for the opening number of the contestants with the Swimsuits on December 22, 2023 in Vietnam performances Bamboo Mañalac (instead Pitbull), Jimenez (instead Lopez) and Anahi (instead Leitte).

== Track listing ==
- German CD Single
1. "We Are One (Ole Ola)" (featuring Jennifer Lopez and Claudia Leitte) – 3:42
2. "We Are One (Ole Ola)" (featuring Jennifer Lopez and Claudia Leitte) (Olodum mix) – 3:56
- Digital download
1. "We Are One (Ole Ola)" (featuring Jennifer Lopez and Claudia Leitte) – 3:42
- Digital download – remix
1. "We Are One (Ole Ola)" (featuring Jennifer Lopez and Claudia Leitte) (Olodum mix) – 3:56
- Digital download – opening ceremony version
1. "We Are One (Ole Ola)" (featuring Jennifer Lopez and Claudia Leitte) (Opening Ceremony Version) – 5:21

== Credits and personnel ==
Recording

- Engineered at Al Burna's Extreme Mobile Recording Studio; eightysevenfourteen Studios, Los Angeles, California; Luke's in the Boo, Malibu, California; Miami Lights Studio, Miami, Florida; and Delta Lab Studios, Copenhagen, Denmark
- Pitbull vocals recorded at Al Burna's Extreme Mobile Recording Studio, Santo Domingo, Dominican Republic
- Mixed at MixStar Studios, Virginia Beach, Virginia
- Mastered at Sterling Sound, New York City

Personnel

- Armando C. Perez – songwriter, vocals
- Thomas Troelsen – songwriter, producer, instruments, programming, additional background vocals, whistle
- Jennifer Lopez – songwriter, vocals
- Claudia Leitte – songwriter, vocals
- Daniel Murcia – songwriter
- Sia Furler – songwriter
- Nadir Khayat – songwriter, producer, instruments, programming, additional background vocals
- Lukasz "Dr. Luke" Gottwald – songwriter, producer, instruments, programming, additional background vocals
- Henry "Cirkut" Walter – songwriter, producer, instruments, programming, additional background vocals
- Al Burna – engineer, Pitbull vocal recording
- Rachael Findlen – engineer
- Clint Gibbs – engineer
- Cameron Montgomery – assistant engineer
- Serban Ghenea – mixer
- John Hanes – engineer for mix
- Chris Gehringer – mastering

== Charts ==
=== Weekly charts ===
Chart (2014)	Peak position
Austria (Ö3 Austria Top 40)	6
Belgium (Ultratop 50 Flanders)	2
Belgium Dance (Ultratop Flanders)	10
Belgium (Ultratop 50 Wallonia)	1
Belgium Dance (Ultratop Wallonia)	1
Brazil Hot 100 Airplay (Billboard Brasil)	19
Canada Hot 100 (Billboard)	51
CIS Airplay (TopHit)	90
Colombia Top 5 Música Anglo (National-Report)	3
Czech Republic Airplay (ČNS IFPI)	16
Czech Republic Singles Digital (ČNS IFPI)	29
Denmark (Tracklisten)	16
Euro Digital Songs (Billboard)	7
Finland (Suomen virallinen latauslista)	5
France (SNEP)	3
Germany (GfK)	6
Greece Digital Songs (Billboard)	5
Hungary (Rádiós Top 40)	23
Hungary (Single Top 40)	1
Ireland (IRMA)	24
Israel International Airplay (Media Forest)	2
Italy (FIMI)	2
Japan Hot 100 (Billboard)	12
Lebanon (Lebanese Top 20)	2
Luxembourg (Billboard)	2
Mexico Anglo (Monitor Latino)	3
Netherlands (Dutch Top 40)	9
Netherlands (Single Top 100)	9
Norway (VG-lista)	15
Poland Airplay (ZPAV)	3
Poland Dance (ZPAV)	3
Scotland Singles (OCC)	27
Slovakia Airplay (ČNS IFPI)	40
Slovakia Singles Digital (ČNS IFPI)	40
Slovenia (SloTop50)	10
South Korea (Gaon International Chart)	15
Spain (Promusicae)	4
Sweden (Sverigetopplistan)	52
Switzerland (Schweizer Hitparade)	2
Switzerland (Media Control Romandy)	1
UK Singles (OCC)	29
Ukraine Airplay (TopHit)	62
US Billboard Hot 100	59
US Latin Airplay (Billboard)	13
US Latin Pop Airplay (Billboard)	14

Chart (2026)	Peak position
Global Excl. US (Billboard)	199

=== Year-end charts ===
Chart (2014)	Position
Belgium (Ultratop Flanders)	45
Belgium (Ultratop Wallonia)	36
France (SNEP)	70
Germany (Official German Charts)	41
Hungary (Rádiós Top 40)	100
Hungary (Single Top 40)	26
Italy (FIMI)	44
Japan Adult Contemporary (Billboard)	17
Netherlands (Dutch Top 40)	68
Netherlands (Single Top 100)	94
Poland (Dance Top 50)	6
Poland (ZPAV)	42
Spain (PROMUSICAE)	39
Switzerland (Schweizer Hitparade)	62
UK (Single Sales Chart)	93

== Certifications ==
Region	Certification	Certified units/sales
Germany (BVMI)	Gold	150,000^{^}
Italy (FIMI)	Platinum	30,000^{‡}
Mexico (AMPROFON)	Gold	30,000^{*}
Spain (Promusicae)	Gold	30,000^{‡}
Switzerland (IFPI Switzerland)	Gold	15,000^{^}
United Kingdom (BPI)	Silver	200,000^{‡}
United States (RIAA)	Platinum	1,000,000^{‡}
Streaming
Denmark (IFPI Danmark)	Gold	1,300,000^{†}
Spain (Promusicae)	Platinum	8,000,000^{†}
^{*} Sales figures based on certification alone.^{^} Shipments figures based on certification alone.^{‡} Sales+streaming figures based on certification alone.^{†} Streaming-only figures based on certification alone.

== Release history ==
Country	Date	Format	Label
Germany	April 8, 2014	Digital download	Sony
Italy	April 18, 2014	Mainstream radio	Sony
Germany	May 9, 2014	CD single	Sony
