= Alexandre Pires (album) =

2001 debut studio album by Alexandre Pires

Studio album by Alexandre Pires
- Released: September 11, 2001
- Recorded: February - July 2001
- Studio: Midnight Blue Studios (Miami, Florida, U.S.)
- Genre: Latin pop; samba; latin ballad
- Length: 48:32 (Spanish edition); 53:55 (Brazilian edition)
- Language: Spanish; Portuguese
- Label: BMG U.S. Latin
- Producer: Rey-Neiro; Estéfano; Donato Póveda; Raúl del Sol

Alexandre Pires chronology
Alexandre Pires (2001)	Minha Vida, Minha Música (2002)

Singles from Alexandre Pires
- 1. "Usted Se Me Llevó La Vida" Released: June 18, 2001; 2. "Necesidad" Released: December 3, 2001; 3. "Es Por Amor" Released: May 20, 2002

Alexandre Pires is a title of the eponymous debut studio album recorded by the Brazilian singer-songwriter Alexandre Pires. The album witch released by BMG U.S. Latin on September 11, 2001 (see 2001 in music). The Brazilian edition was called É Por Por Amor. The album witch produced by Rey-Neiro, co-produced by Estéfano, Donato Póveda and Raúl del Sol.

The album was supported by three singles: "Usted Se Me Llevó La Vida", "Necesidad" and "Es Por Amor"

== Track listing ==
Spanish edition (Alexandre Pires)
No.	Title	Writer(s)	Producer (es)	Length
1.	"Usted Se Me Llevó La Vida"	Estéfano; Donato Póveda	Rey-Neiro	4:34
2.	"Aquí Nada Es Igual"	Estéfano; Donato Póveda	Rey-Neiro	4:00
3.	"Si Tú Me Amaras"	Claudia Brant; Kiko Cibrián	Rey-Neiro	4:31
4.	"Demasiado Fuerte"	Estéfano; Raúl del Sol	Raúl del Sol	3:35
5.	"Necesidad"	Estéfano	Rey-Neiro	5:43
6.	"Es Por Amor"	Estéfano; Donato Póveda	Rey-Neiro	4:54
7.	"Cómo Una Ola En El Mar" (Como uma Onda (Zen-Surfismo))	Nelson Motta · Lulú Santos; Adapt: Spanish: Estéfano	Rey-Neiro	4:11
8.	"Qué Llueve Pa'Rriba"	Estéfano	Rey-Neiro	4:25
9.	"Ni Un Poquito de Piedad"	Alexandre Pires; Pedro Ferreira; Estéfano	Rey-Neiro	4:37
10.	"Abandono" (Abandono)	Júlio Borges · Alexandre Lucas · Júlio Borges · Cacá Moraes; Adapt: Spanish: Estéfano	Rey-Neiro	4:42
11.	"Amor de Mujer" (with Shawn Desmond)	Estéfano; Donato Póveda	Raúl del Sol	3:30
Total length:				48:32

Brazilian edition (É Por Amor)
No.	Title	Writer(s)	Length
1.	"Você Roubou a Minha Vida"	Estéfano; Donato Póveda	4:36
2.	"Sem Teu Amor Nada é Igual"	Estéfano; Donato Póveda	4:04
3.	"Se Ela me Amasse"	Claudia Brant; Kiko Cibrián	4:31
4.	"Foi Demais"	Estéfano; Raúl del Sol	3:35
5.	"Necessidades"	Estéfano	5:43
6.	"É Por Amor"	Estéfano; Donato Póveda	4:55
7.	"Se Chover Pra Cima"	Estéfano	4:19
8.	"Longe de Você"	Estéfano; Pedro Ferreira; Alexandre Pires	4:37
9.	"Amor de Mulher"	Estéfano; Donato Póveda	3:35
10.	"Dois Loucos Enamorados"	Estéfano; Donato Póveda	4:49
11.	"Usted Se Me Llevó La Vida"	Estéfano; Donato Póveda	4:34
12.	"Abandono"	Estéfano; Alexandre Lucas	4:41
Total length:			53:55

== Charts ==
Chart (2001)	Peak position
US Top Latin Albums (Billboard)	3
US Latin Pop Albums (Billboard)	2

== Certifications ==
Region	Certification	Certified units/sales
Brazil (Pro-Música Brasil)	Platinum	125,000^{*}
Brazil (Pro-Música Brasil) É Por Amor (Brazilian Edition)	Platinum	125,000^{*}
United States (RIAA)	2× Platinum (Latin)	200,000^{^}
Summaries
Worldwide	—	1,100,000
^{*} Sales figures based on certification alone.^{^} Shipments figures based on certification alone.
