= Quiz & Larossi =

Swedish musical duo

- Origin: Stockholm, Sweden
- Genres: Pop
- Years active: 1999–present
- Labels: publisher: Universal Music Publishing
- Members: Andreas Romdhane; Josef Larossi
- Website: Myspace

Andreas Romdhane (a.k.a. Quiz) and Josef Larossi, collectively known as Quiz & Larossi, are a Swedish production duo. They have a studio based in the centre of Stockholm, Sweden, and have worked together since 1999 when they wrote songs for Lutricia McNeal.

During their partnership, they have written/produced songs for a wide variety of acts such as Kelly Clarkson, the Pussycat Dolls, Il Divo, Geri Halliwell, Diana Ross, Alexandra Burke, the Saturdays and Westlife.

They have had six number one singles in the UK. The duo have written eight songs for Il Divo, who have to this day sold 28 million albums worldwide.

They were claimed by Music Business Worldwide to have been commissioned by Spotify to produce tracks for playlists under various pseudonyms (including Deep Watch, Piotr Miteska, Evolution of Stars, Karin Borg, Antologie, Bon Vie, Benny Bernstein, and the 2 Inversions).

== Discography ==
Examples of songs that Quiz & Larossi have written and/or produced:

=== Songs/Productions ===
- "Don't Let Me Stop You" - Kelly Clarkson
- "I Will Pray (Pregherò)" - Giorgia & Alicia Keys
- "I Like It" - JLS
- "Another One" - Conor Maynard
- “Here & Now" - Steps
- "Crazy in Love" - Sofia Karlberg
- "Twilight" - Cover Drive (#1 UK)
- "Make You Mine" (additional production and remix) - Talay Riley
- "Candy" - Aggro Santos featuring Kimberly Wyatt (#3 UK)
- "Up" - The Saturdays (Chasing Lights) (#5 UK)
- "Hallelujah" - Alexandra Burke (#1 UK)
- "Hush Hush; Hush Hush" - The Pussycat Dolls (#1 Russia & Ukraine)
- "Hero" (with The X Factor Finalists 2008) (#1 UK)
- "The Rose" - Westlife (#1 UK)
- "Wake Up Call" - Hayden Panettiere
- "When You Tell Me That You Love Me" - Diana Ross (#2 UK)
- "Ride It" - Geri Halliwell (#4 UK)
- "Don't Say It's Too Late" - Westlife
- "Cradle" - Atomic Kitten
- "I Didn't Want You Anyway" - Hear'Say
- "365 Days" - Lutricia McNeal
- "You Don't Love Me" - Stephanie McIntosh
- "Like U Like" - Aggro Santos & Kimberley Walsh
- "Bombo" - Adelén (2nd place in Norwegian national final for the Eurovision Song Contest)
- "In Your Head" - Mohombi
- "Love Sux" - Linda Teodosiu (#24 Germany, #72 Austria)

==== Il Divo ====
- "Mama"
- "Sei Parte Ormai Di Me"
- "The Man You Love"
- "Isabel"
- "Una Noche"
- "Enamorado"
- "Angelina"
- "La Luna"
