= Alexandre Pires =

Brazilian singer-songwriter (born 1976)

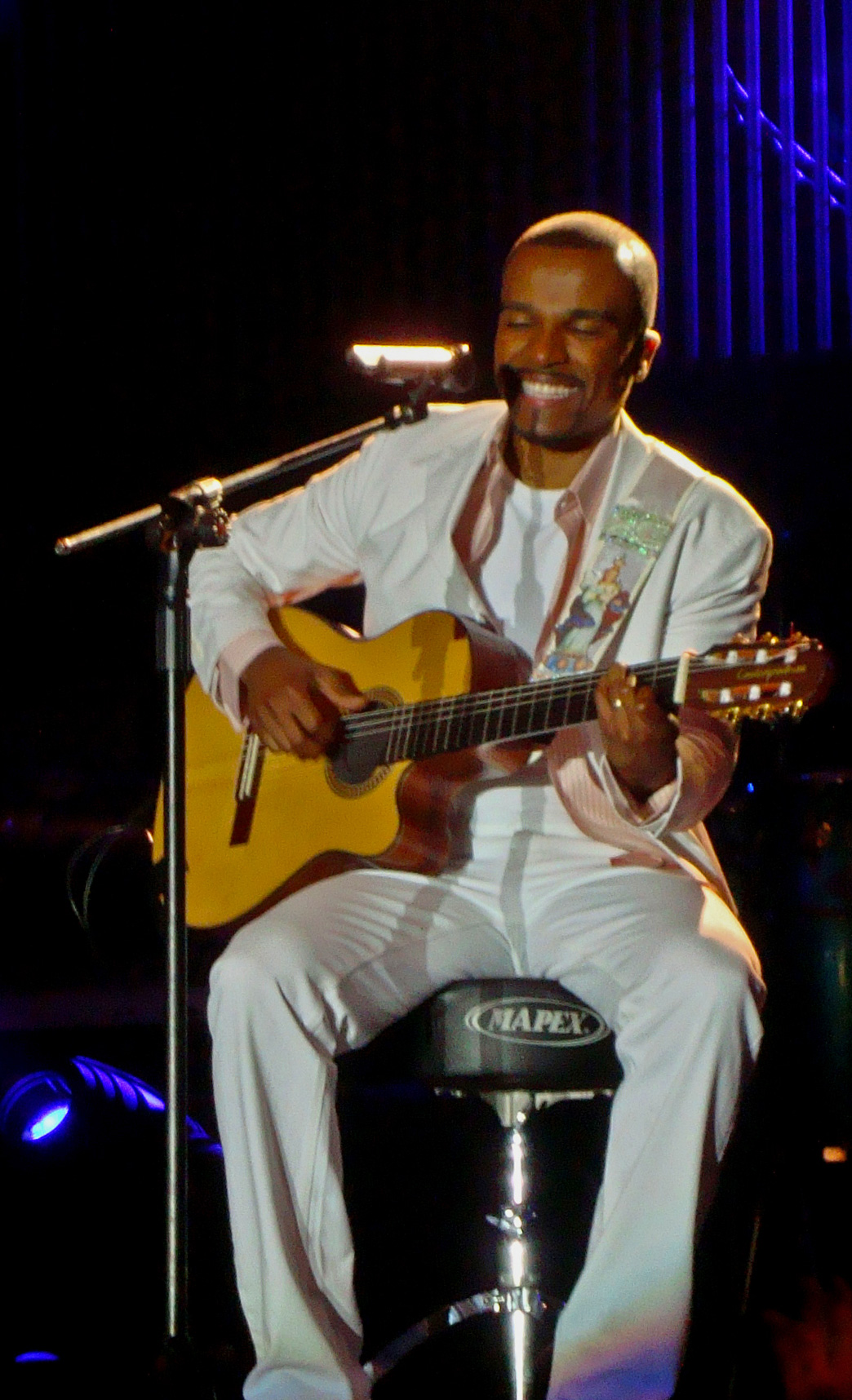

Background information
- Born: Alexandre Pires do Nascimento; January 8, 1976 (age 50); Uberlândia, Minas Gerais
- Origin: Uberlândia, Minas Gerais, Brazil
- Genres: Pagode, samba, pop, latin pop
- Occupation: singer-songwriter
- Instrument: Voice
- Years active: 1987–present
- Labels: BMG U.S. Latn, EMI Music, Sony Music
- Member of: Só Pra Contrariar

Alexandre Pires do Nascimento (born January 8, 1976) is a Brazilian singer-songwriter. Pires was previously the singer of group Só Pra Contrariar which he joined in the late 1980s.

== Career ==
Pires began his career playing a new and more appellative style of samba that is known as Pagode and more romantic too that used to be known as Samba-canção and now is known as Samba Romântico. After his rhythm and melody started to become a little more romantic. He crossed the vertent known as "Pagode Romântico" and then he jumped to Samba-canção his favourite style. The Sambas-canção most famous are "Depois do Prazer" and "Tudo tem A ver" with a lot of influences of Brazilian Country Music ("Sertaneja"). The pagodes that are the most famous are "Quando é Amor", "A barata" and "Mineirinho" produced with the group Só Pra Contrariar. At that time, he received also a lot the influences of Cauby Peixoto, Ângela Maria and Agnaldo Rayol, mainly because his father was one of the best friends of Cauby Peixoto, according to a conversation with Pires at TV also edited at the internet. When he finished his last album with the group he produced also Romantic pop and Latin music.

After several albums in Portuguese, the band released a very successful album in 1999 titled Juegos de Amor. The album included the hit song "Santo Santo" featuring Gloria Estefan.

In 1998, Pires co-starred in the critically panned film Cinderela Baiana, alongside his then-girlfriend, Carla Perez.

On July 3, 2001, Pires released his first solo album to much success. He has continued to release albums both in Portuguese and in Spanish achieving several hits in Latin charts.

In 2007, he released a tribute album to Spanish singer Julio Iglesias. That 2007, he met and had a duet on the song titled "Junto A Ti" with Kika Edgar from the telenovela Bajo las Riendas del Amor.

== Non-original music ==
- Estrela Cadente (Falling Star) – Created after A-ha's Hunting High And Low.
- Minha Fantasia (My Fantasy) – Created after Lenny Kravitz's It Ain't Over 'til It's Over.
- Eva Meu Amor (Eva My Love) – Created after Paul Young's Everytime You Go Away.
- Um Mundo Ideal (An Ideal World) – Created after Brad Kane & Lea Salonga's A Whole New World.
- A Musa das Minhas Canções (The Diva of My Songs) – Created after Toni Braxton's Spanish Guitar.

== Discography ==
Studio albums

- Alexandre Pires (2001)
- Minha Vida, Minha Música (2002)
- Estrella Guía (2003)
- Alma Brasileira (2004)
- Alto-Falante (2004)
- Meu Samba (2005)
- A Un Idolo (2007)
- Mais Além (2010)
- Pecado Original (2015)
- Em Casa – Ao Vivo (2008)
- Mais Além – Ao Vivo (2010)
- Eletrosamba (2012)

== Awards and nominations ==
Year	Awards	Category	Recipient	Outcome	Ref.
2000	Latin Grammy Awards	Best Pop Performance by a Duo/Group with Vocals	Santo Santo	Nominated	
2002	Latin Billboard Music Awards	Pop album of the year, New artist	Alexandre Pires	Nominated	
2002	Premio Lo Nuestro	Pop New Artist	Alexandre Pires	Nominated	
2003	Latin Billboard Music Awards	Artist of the Year	Alexandre Pires	Won	
2003	Latin Grammy Awards	Album of the Year	Estrella Guía	Nominated	
2003	Latin Grammy Awards	Best Male Pop Vocal Album	Estrella Guía	Nominated	
2004	Premio Lo Nuestro	Pop Male Artist of the Year	Alexandre Pires	Nominated	
2013	Latin Grammy Awards	Best Samba/Pagode Album	Eletrosamba – Ao Vivo	Won	
2017	Latin Grammy Awards	Best MPB Album	DNA Musical	Nominated	
