= The Searchers discography =

- Studio albums: 9
- Extended plays: 9
- Live albums: 2
- Compilation albums: 22
- Singles: 46
- Box sets: 2

In their native Britain, between 1963 and 2019, the English rock band the Searchers released eight studio albums, nine extended plays (EPs) and 30 singles. However, the band's international discography is complicated, due to different versions of their albums sometimes being released in other countries, particularly in the US. In some cases, the US version would be an entirely different album with different cover photos and tracks (collections of material from various UK releases).

The early "core" albums and singles released from 1963 to 1967 were originally on Pye Records in the United Kingdom, and Kapp Records in the United States. Later, they released records on Liberty, RCA, Sire and PRT Records. Their last studio album Hungry Hearts was released only in Germany on Coconut Records. The Searchers did not release any official live album in the UK (although there were several low-cost concert albums or live collector's CDs). Philips Records recorded their performance in 1963 at the German Star-Club, Hamburg. These songs were later released in many variations especially in Germany and the US. Many UK album tracks were also released as a singles in different countries and sometimes became hits (e. i. "Love Potion No. 9", "Ain't That Just Like Me", "Bumble Bee", "I Don't Want to Go On Without You" etc.). Additionally, they released three SPs with German language versions of their hits and one EP in French.

The Searchers' discography was originally released on the vinyl format, with full-length long plays (LPs), shorter EPs (mostly 4 songs) and singles (2 songs). Over the years, the collection has also been released on many compact discs (CDs).

== Albums ==
=== Studio albums ===
Title	Album details	Peak chart positions			
Title	Album details	UK	GER	SWE	US
Meet the Searchers (UK)	Released: August 1963; Label: Pye; Formats: LP	2	20	—	—
Sugar and Spice (UK)	Released: November 1963; Label: Pye; Formats: LP	5	30	—	—
Meet the Searchers/Needles and Pins (US)	Released: March 1964; Label: Kapp; Formats: LP	—	—	—	22
It's the Searchers (UK)	Released: 22 May 1964; Label: Pye; Formats: LP, 4-track	4	—	—	—
This Is Us (US)	Released: August 1964; Label: Kapp; Formats: LP	—	—	—	97
The New Searchers LP (US)	Released: February 1965; Label: Kapp; Formats: LP	—	—	—	112
Sounds Like Searchers (UK)	Released: 19 March 1965; Label: Pye; Formats: LP, 4-track	8	28	—	—
The Searchers No. 4 (US)	Released: September 1965; Label: Kapp; Formats: LP	—	—	—	149
Take Me for What I'm Worth (UK)	Released: 26 November 1965; Label: Pye; Formats: LP	—	—	—	—
Take Me for What I'm Worth (US)	Released: February 1966; Label: Kapp; Formats: LP	—	—	—	—
Second Take	Released: November 1972; Label: RCA Victor; Formats: LP; Consists of re-recordings	—	—	—	—
Searchers	Released: October 1979; Label: Sire; Formats: LP, MC	—	—	32	191
Love's Melodies (US)	Released: March 1981; Label: Sire; Formats: LP, MC	—	—	—	—
Play for Today (UK)	Released: April 1981; Label: Sire; Formats: LP, MC	—	—	—	—
Hungry Hearts	Released: 1988; Label: Coconut; Formats: CD, LP, MC	—	—	—	—
"—" denotes releases that did not chart or were not released in that territory.

=== Live albums ===
Title	Album details	Peak chart positions	
Title	Album details	GER	US
Sweets for My Sweet – The Searchers at the Star-Club Hamburg (Germany and Australia title) Hear! Hear! (US title)	Released: May 1964; Label: Philips, Mercury; Formats: LP	11	120
The Searchers Meet the Rattles (Split album with the Rattles)	Released: January 1965; Label: Mercury; Formats: LP	—	—
"—" denotes releases that did not chart or were not released in that territory.

=== Compilation albums ===
Title	Album details	Peak chart positions		
Title	Album details	UK	FIN	GER
Needles and Pins	Released: 1964; Label: Vogue; Formats: LP	—	—	19
The Searchers' Smash Hits	Released: November 1966; Label: Marble Arch; Formats: LP	—	7	—
Searchers' Smash Hits Vol. 2	Released: April 1967; Label: Marble Arch; Formats: LP	—	—	—
Golden Hour of the Searchers	Released: November 1972; Label: Golden Hour; Formats: LP, MC	—	—	—
Golden Hour of the Searchers Vol. 2	Released: October 1973; Label: Golden Hour; Formats: LP, MC	—	—	—
The Searchers File	Released: October 1977; Label: Pye; Formats: 2×LP, MC	—	—	—
Greatest Hits	Released: April 1985; Label: Rhino; Formats: LP, MC	—	—	—
The Searchers Play the System – Rarities, Oddities & Flipsides	Released: 5 October 1987; Label: PRT; Formats: CD, LP, MC	—	—	—
The EP Collection	Released: 16 October 1989; Label: See for Miles; Formats: CD, LP, MC	—	—	—
German, French + Rare Recordings	Released: 1990; Label: Repertoire; Formats: CD, LP	—	—	—
The Searchers 30th Anniversary Collection 1962–1992	Released: 1992; Label: Sequel; Formats: 3×CD	—	—	—
The EP Collection Volume Two	Released: 12 October 1992; Label: See for Miles; Formats: CD	—	—	—
Second Take – The Complete RCA/UK Recordings	Released: 1999; Label: Taragon; Formats: CD	—	—	—
The Pye Anthology 1963–1967	Released: April 2000; Label: Sequel; Formats: 2×CD	—	—	—
The Swedish Radio Sessions	Released: November 2001; Label: Castle Music; Formats: CD	—	—	—
The Iron Door Sessions	Released: April 2002; Label: Castle Music; Formats: 2×CD	—	—	—
1963-2003: 40th Anniversary Collection	Released: 2 June 2003; Label: Castle Music; Formats: 2×CD	—	—	—
The Definitive Pye Collection	Released: 23 February 2004; Label: Sanctuary; Formats: 3×CD	—	—	—
BBC Sessions	Released: June 2004; Label: Castle Music; Formats: 2×CD	—	—	—
The Very Best of the Searchers	Released: 12 May 2008; Label: Universal; Formats: CD	11	—	—
Another Night: The Sire Recordings 1979–1981	Released: 8 December 2017; Label: Omnivore Recordings; Formats: 2×CD	—	—	—
The Farewell Album / The Greatest Hits & More	Released: 25 January 2019; Label: BMG; Formats: 2×CD	35	—	—
"—" denotes releases that did not chart or were not released in that territory.

=== Box sets ===
Title	Album details
Hearts in Their Eyes – Celebrating 50 Years of Harmony & Jangle	Released: 25 June 2012; Label: Universal; Formats: 4×CD
When You Walk in the Room: The Complete Pye Recordings 1963–67	Released: 5 April 2019; Label: Grapefruit; Formats: 6×CD

=== Private pressings ===
Since the late 1990s, as CD-making processes have become more available and cheaper, the Searchers have released a number of private pressings, only available at the band's shows.

- 1998 – Live!
- 2000 – Live II
- 2003 – Live III
- 2005 – On Stage
- 2008 – The Definitive Searchers Live in Concert
- 2010 – Still Searching
- 2012 – Tracks of Our Years

== EPs ==
Title	EP details	Peak chart positions
Title	EP details	UK
Ain't Gonna Kiss Ya	Released: September 1963; Label: Pye; Formats: 7"	1
Sweet for My Sweet	Released: November 1963; Label: Pye; Formats: 7"	5
Hungry for Love	Released: January 1964; Label: Pye; Formats: 7"	4
Play the System	Released: 27 November 1964; Label: Pye; Formats: 7"	4
When You Walk in the Room	Released: 15 January 1965; Label: Pye; Formats: 7"	12
Bumble Bee	Released: April 1965; Label: Pye; Formats: 7"	1
Searchers '65	Released: 13 August 1965; Label: Pye; Formats: 7"	15
Four by Four	Released: 26 November 1965; Label: Pye; Formats: 7"	—
Take Me for What I'm Worth	Released: 14 October 1966; Label: Pye; Formats: 7"	—
"—" denotes releases that did not chart.

== Singles ==
Title	Year	Peak chart positions										UK Album	US Album
Title	Year	UK	AUS	CAN	GER	IRE	NL	NOR	NZ	SWE	US	UK Album	US Album
"Sweets for My Sweet" b/w "It's All Been a Dream"	1963	1	28	—	44	1	—	8	1	5	—	A: Meet the Searchers; B: Non-album track	A: Hear! Hear! B: Non-album track
"Sweet Nothin's" b/w "What'd I Say?"	1963	48	—	—	—	—	—	—	—	—	—	Non-album tracks	A: The Searchers Meet the Rattles; B: Non-album track
"Sugar and Spice" b/w "Saints and Searchers"	1963	2	57	11	—	6	—	—	6	—	44	Sugar and Spice	Non-album tracks
"Needles and Pins" b/w "Saturday Night Out"	1964	1	4	14	8	1	—	8	1	6	13	A: It's The Searchers; B: Non-album track	Meet the Searchers
"Süß ist sie" ("Sugar and Spice") (Note: Both sides sung in German and only released as a single in Germany.) b/w "Liebe" ("Money")	1964	—	—	—	—	—	—	—	—	—	—	Non-album tracks	Non-album tracks
"Ain't That Just Like Me" (Note: "Ain't That Just Like Me" was only released as a single in the US and Canada.) b/w "Ain't Gonna Kiss Ya"	1964	—	—	19	—	—	—	—	—	—	61	A: Sugar and Spice; B: Meet the Searchers	Meet the Searchers
"Don't Throw Your Love Away" b/w "I Pretend I'm with You"	1964	1	14	3	37	1	—	—	1	3	16	A: It's the Searchers; B: Non-album track	This Is Us
"Tausend Nadelstiche" ("Needles and Pins") b/w "Farmer John"	1964	—	—	—	—	—	—	—	—	—	—	Non-album tracks	Non-album tracks
"Ain't Gonna Kiss Ya" (Note: "Ain't Gonna Kiss Ya" was only released as a single in Australia.) b/w "Love Potion Number Nine"	1964	—	20	—	—	—	—	—	—	—	—	Meet the Searchers	A: Meet the Searchers; B: This Is Us
"Some Day We're Gonna Love Again" b/w "No One Else Could Love Me"	1964	11	48	19	—	—	—	—	—	—	34	Non-album tracks	Non-album tracks
"When You Walk in the Room" b/w "(I'll Be) Missing You"	1964	3	2	21	—	4	—	—	—	20	35	Non-album tracks	Non-album tracks
"Love Potion Number Nine" (Note: "Love Potion Number Nine" was released as a single in a number of territories, including the US, Canada, Australia and Germany.) b/w "Hi-Heel Sneakers"	1964	—	—	6	23	—	—	—	4	—	3	A: Meet the Searchers; B: It's the Searchers	This Is Us
"What Have They Done to the Rain" b/w "This Feeling Inside"	1964	13	27	2	—	—	— (Note: "What Have They Done to the Rain" did not enter the then-Top 10, but did peak at number 25 on the Dutch Top 40.)	—	—	13	29	Non-album tracks	A: The New Searchers LP; B: Non-album track
"Goodbye My Love" b/w "'Till I Met You"	1965	4	25	12	16	7	7	—	—	—	52	Non-album tracks	The Searchers No. 4
"Bumble Bee" (Note: "Bumble Bee" was released as a single in various territories including the US, Canada, Australia and the Netherlands.) b/w "Everything You Do"	1965	—	13	7	—	—	— (Note: "Bumble Bee" did not enter the then-Top 10, but did peak at number 23 on the Dutch Top 40.)	—	—	20	21	Sounds Like Searchers	The New Searchers LP
"Verzeih' My Love" ("Goodbye My Love") b/w "Wenn ich dich seh'" ("When You Walk in the Room")	1965	—	—	—	—	—	—	—	—	—	—	Non-album tracks	Non-album tracks
"He's Got No Love" b/w "So Far Away"	1965	12	—	17	—	—	— (Note: "He's Got No Love" did not enter the then-Top 10, but did peak at number 14 on the Dutch Top 40.)	—	—	—	79	Non-album tracks	Take Me for What I'm Worth
"I Don't Want to Go On Without You" (Note: "I Don't Want to Go On Without You" was only released as a single in the Netherlands.) b/w "A Tear Fell"	1965	—	—	—	—	—	18	—	—	—	—	Sounds Like Searchers	The New Searchers LP
"Magic Potion" (Note: "Magic Potion" was only released as a single in Australia.) b/w "Everything You Do"	1965	—	95	—	—	—	—	—	—	—	—	Sounds Like Searchers	The New Searchers LP
"When I Get Home" b/w "I'm Never Coming Back"	1965	35	—	—	—	—	—	—	—	—	—	Non-album tracks	Take Me for What I'm Worth
"Don't Know Why" (Note: "Don't Know Why" was only released as a single in the US.) b/w "You Can't Lie to a Liar"	1965	—	—	—	—	—	—	—	—	—	—	Take Me for What I'm Worth	Take Me for What I'm Worth
"Take Me for What I'm Worth" b/w "Too Many Miles"	1965	20	41	—	—	—	— (Note: "Take Me for What I'm Worth" did not enter the then-Top 20, but did peak at number 25 on the Dutch Top 40.)	—	7	14	76	Take Me for What I'm Worth	Take Me for What I'm Worth
"Everybody Come Clap Your Hands" (Note: "Everybody Come Clap Your Hands" was only released as a single in Sweden.) b/w "Till You Say You'll Be Mine"	1966	—	—	—	—	—	—	—	—	18	—	Sounds Like Searchers	The New Searchers LP
"Take It or Leave It" b/w "Don't Hide It Away"	1966	31	83	—	—	—	7	—	—	6	—	Non-album tracks	Non-album tracks
"Have You Ever Loved Somebody" b/w "It's Just the Way (Love Will Come and Go)"	1966	48	85	48	—	—	—	—	—	—	94	Non-album tracks	Non-album tracks
"Popcorn, Double Feature" b/w "Lovers"	1967	— (Note: Chart position is from the official UK "Breakers List".)	—	—	—	—	—	—	—	—	—	Non-album tracks	Non-album tracks
"Western Union" b/w "I'll Cry Tomorrow"	1967	—	—	—	—	—	— (Note: "Western Union" did not enter the then-Top 20, but did peak at number 19 on the Dutch Top 40 alongside the version by the Five Americans.)	—	—	—	—	Non-album tracks	Non-album tracks
"Secondhand Dealer" b/w "Crazy Dreams"	1967	—	—	—	—	—	—	—	—	—	—	Non-album tracks	Non-album tracks
"Umbrella Man" b/w "Over the Weekend"	1968	—	—	—	—	—	—	—	—	—	—	Non-album tracks	Non-album tracks
"Shoot 'Em Up Baby" (Note: "Shoot 'Em Up Baby" was only released as a single in Germany.) b/w "Suzanna"	1969	—	—	—	—	—	—	—	—	—	—	Non-album tracks	Non-album tracks
"Somebody Shot the Lollipop Man" (as Pasha) b/w "Pussy Willow Dragon"	1969	—	—	—	—	—	—	—	—	—	—	Non-album tracks	Non-album tracks
"Kinky Kathy Abernathy" b/w "Suzanna"	1969	—	—	—	—	—	—	—	—	—	—	Non-album tracks	Non-album tracks
"Desdemona" b/w "The World Is Waiting for Tomorrow"	1971	—	—	—	—	—	—	—	—	—	94	A: Second Take; B: Non-album track	Non-album tracks
"Love Is Everywhere" b/w "And a Button"	1971	—	—	—	—	—	—	—	—	—	—	Non-album tracks	Non-album tracks
"Sing Singer Sing" b/w "Come On Back to Me"	1972	—	—	—	—	—	—	—	—	—	—	A: Non-album track B: Second Take	Non-album tracks
"Needles and Pins" (re-recording) b/w "When You Walk in the Room" / "Come On Back to Me"	1972	—	—	—	—	—	—	—	—	—	—	Second Take	Non-album tracks
"Vahevala" b/w "Madman"	1972	—	—	—	—	—	—	—	—	—	—	Non-album tracks	Non-album tracks
"Solitaire" b/w "Spics and Specks"	1973	—	—	—	—	—	—	—	—	—	—	Non-album tracks	Non-album tracks
"Heart in Her Eyes" b/w "Don't Hang On"	1979	—	—	—	—	—	—	—	—	—	—	Searchers	Searchers
"It's Too Late" b/w "This Kind of Love Affair"	1980	—	—	—	—	—	—	—	—	—	—	Searchers	Searchers
"Love's Melody" b/w "Changing" (UK); "Little Bit of Heaven" (US)	1980	—	—	—	—	—	—	—	—	—	—	A & US B: Play for Today; UK B: Non-album track	A & US B: Love's Melodies; UK B: Non-album track
"Another Night" b/w "Back to the War"	1981	—	—	—	—	—	—	—	—	—	—	A: Play for Today; B: Non-album track	A: Love's Melodies; B: Non-album track
"I Don't Want to Be the One" b/w "Hollywood"	1982	—	—	—	—	—	—	—	—	—	—	Non-album tracks	Non-album tracks
"Forever in Love (Near to Heaven)" (Note: "Forever in Love (Near to Heaven)" was only released as a single in Continental Europe.) b/w "Every Little Tear"	1988	—	—	—	—	—	—	—	—	—	—	Non-album tracks (Note: Tracks were released on the Continental Europe album Hungry Hearts.)	Non-album tracks
"Needles and Pins" (re-recording) (Note: Only released as a single in Continental Europe.) b/w "Fooled Myself Once Again"	1989	—	—	—	—	—	—	—	—	—	—	Non-album tracks	Non-album tracks
"No Other Love" (Note: "No Other Love" was only released as a single in Continental Europe.) b/w "Push Push"	1989	—	—	—	—	—	—	—	—	—	—	Non-album tracks	Non-album tracks
"—" denotes releases that did not chart or were not released in that territory.
