= The Searchers 30th Anniversary Collection 1962–1992 =

1992 compilation album by the Searchers

30th Anniversary Collection 1962–1992

Compilation album by The Searchers
- Released: 1992
- Recorded: 1963–1983
- Genre: Rock/pop
- Label: Sequel
- Producers: Tony Hatch, John Verity, Peter Collins

The Searchers 30th Anniversary Collection 1962–1992 is a compilation album of songs by the English rock band The Searchers released by Sequel Records. This collection including all of their A-sides released on Pye Records, nearly all B-sides and many of their album tracks. The third disc featured rarities, plus previously unreleased material intended for unfinished LP from 1983.

== Overview ==
Album was released on the 30th anniversary of the band's founding. With 84-song set this is a pretty definitive collection of the group's sixties material originally released on Pye Records from 1963 to 1967. The first disc contains singles, the second album tracks and the third rarities. This collection also includes solo singles by the band members Tony Jackson and Chris Curtis ("Stage Door", "Watch Your Step", "Aggravation"), alternate Searchers’ takes ("I'll Be Doggone", "Someday We're Gonna Love Again"), foreign-language versions of their hits ("Tausend Nadelstiche", "Verzeih' My Love", "Süß Ist Sie") or previously unissued songs ("Once Upon a Time", "Bye Bye Johnny" or "Shame Shame Shame"). There are also five songs originally broadcast on various BBC Light Programme, which were never recorded in a studio or released on a Searchers album, incl. version of Bob Dylan’s "Blowin' in the Wind". "It was in vogue and suited our harmony style perfectly," wrote Frank Allen about this track in his autobiography. The package includes discography, a family tree by Peter Frame, and liner notes by the band’s guitarist John McNally, producer Tony Hatch, compiler Roger Dopson or Tim Viney from The Searchers Appreciation Society.

== Unfinished LP ==
In 1981 the band signed to PRT Records. "They were very enthusiastic and talked about a possible album and how we were going to be big again," wrote Mike Pender in 2014. This box consisted of few songs intended for the album that was never completed ("Innocent Victim", "Good Way To Fall", "New Heart"), produced by the Argent guitarist John Verity in September 1983. "In the end we completed four tracks with Verity," wrote Allen, "before PRT pulled the plug on the project and the proposed releases were shelved." There is also the last Searchers’ British single from this period ("I Don't Want To Be The One" / "Hollywood"), included The Kinks’ Bob Henrit as a session drummer.

== Track listing ==
CD 1 - The Singles
No.	Title	Writer(s)	Originally released)	Length
1.	"Sweets for My Sweet"	Doc Pomus, Mort Shuman	A-side single, "Meet The Searchers"	2:30
2.	"It's All Been A Dream"	Chris Curtis	B-side of "Sweets for My Sweet"	1:51
3.	"Sugar and Spice"	Fred Nightingale	A-side single, "Sugar And Spice"	2:18
4.	"Needles and Pins"	Sonny Bono, Jack Nitzsche	A-side single, "It's the Searchers"	2:15
5.	"Saturday Night Out"	Mark Anthony, Robert Richards	B-side of "Needles and Pins"	1:47
6.	"Don't Throw Your Love Away"	Billy Jackson, Jimmy Wisner	A-side single, "It's The Searchers"	2:19
7.	"I Pretend I'm With You"	Chris Curtis	B-side of "Don't Throw Your Love Away"	2:01
8.	"Someday We're Gonna Love Again"	Sharon McMahan	A-side single	2:01
9.	"No One Else Could Love Me"	Chris Curtis	B-side of "Someday We're Gonna Love Again"	2:16
10.	"When You Walk In The Room"	Jackie DeShannon	A-side single	2:24
11.	"(I'll Be) Missing You"	Chris Curtis, Mike Pender, John McNally, Frank Allen	B-side of "When You Walk in the Room"	2:06
12.	"What Have They Done to the Rain"	Malvina Reynolds	A-side single	2:36
13.	"This Feeling Inside"	Chris Curtis, Frank Allen, John McNally, Mike Pender	B-side of "What Have They Done to the Rain"	1:47
14.	"Goodbye My Love"	Robert Mosley, Lamar Simington, Leroy Swearingen	A-side single	2:58
15.	"'Till I Met You"	Chris Curtis, Frank Allen, John McNally, Mike Pender	B-side of "Goodbye My Love"	3:00
16.	"He's Got No Love"	Chris Curtis, Mike Pender	A-side single	2:38
17.	"So Far Away"	Chris Curtis, Mike Pender	B-side of "He's Got No Love"	2:04
18.	"When I Get Home"	Bobby Darin, Russell Alquist	A-side single	2:13
19.	"I'm Never Coming Back"	Chris Curtis, Mike Pender	B-side of "When I Get Home"	2:03
20.	"Take Me For What I'm Worth"	P. J. Proby	A-side single, Take Me for What I'm Worth	2:43
21.	"Too Many Miles"	Chris Curtis, Frank Allen, John McNally, Mike Pender	B-side of Take Me For What I'm Worth	2:12
22.	"Take It Or Leave It"	Mick Jagger, Keith Richards	A-side single	2:50
23.	"Don't Hide It Away"	Frank Allen, John McNally, Mike Pender	B-side of "Take It or Leave It"	2:44
24.	"Have You Ever Loved Somebody"	Allan Clarke, Graham Nash, Tony Hicks	A-side single	2:42
25.	"It's Just The Way"	John McNally, Mike Pender	B-side of "Have You Ever Loved Somebody"	2:42
26.	"Popcorn Double Feature"	Larry Weiss, Scott English	A-side single	2:58
27.	"Western Union"	Mike Rabon, John Durrill, Norman Ezell	A-side single	2:30
28.	"I'll Cry Tomorrow"	John McNally, Mike Pender	B-side of "Western Union"	3:49
29.	"Second Hand Dealer"	Frank Allen, Mike Pender	A-side single	3:45
30.	"Crazy Dreams"	John McNally, Mike Pender	B-side of "Second Hand Dealer"	2:35

CD 2 - The Album Tracks
No.	Title	Writer(s)	Originally released	Length
1.	"Ain't Gonna Kiss Ya"	James Marcus Smith	Meet the Searchers	2:05
2.	"Love Potion No. 9"	Jerry Leiber, Mike Stoller	Meet the Searchers	2:05
3.	"The System"	Mike Pratt, Robert Richards	EP track	2:05
4.	"Bumble Bee"	LaVern Baker, Leroy Fullylove	Sounds Like Searchers	2:12
5.	"Where Have All the Flowers Gone"	Pete Seeger	Meet the Searchers	2:57
6.	"Alright"	Jerry Ross, Lester Vanadore	Meet the Searchers	2:09
7.	"Farmer John"	Don Harris, Dewey Terry	Meet the Searchers	1:59
8.	"Since You Broke My Heart"	Don Everly, Phil Everly	Meet the Searchers	2:50
9.	"Tricky Dicky"	Jerry Leiber, Mike Stoller	Meet the Searchers	2:08
10.	"Listen to Me"	Charles Hardin, Norman Petty	Sugar and Spice	2:12
11.	"Hungry for Love"	Gordon Mills	Sugar and Spice	2:24
12.	"Ain't That Just Like Me"	Earl Carroll (vocalist), Billy Guy	Sugar and Spice	2:25
13.	"Don't Cha Know"	David Box, Ernie Hall	Sugar and Spice	2:03
14.	"All My Sorrows"	Glenn Yarborough	Sugar and Spice	3:26
15.	"It's In Her Kiss"	Rudy Clark	It's The Searchers	2:15
16.	"Sea of Heartbreak"	Paul Hampton, Hal David	It's The Searchers	2:25
17.	"I Count the Tears"	Doc Pomus, Mort Shuman	It's The Searchers	2:03
18.	"This Empty Place"	Burt Bacharach, Hal David	It's The Searchers	2:07
19.	"Can't Help Forgiving You"	Jackie DeShannon, Sharon Sheeley	It's The Searchers	2:05
20.	"Sho' Know A Lot About Love"	Gary S. Paxton, Buddy Mize	It's The Searchers	2:23
21.	"Magic Potion"	Burt Bacharach, Hal David	Sounds Like Searchers	2:31
22.	"Till You Say You'll Be Mine"	Jackie DeShannon	Sounds Like Searchers	2:15
23.	"I Don't Want to Go On Without You"	Bert Berns, Jerry Wexler	Sounds Like Searchers	2:57
24.	"A Tear Fell"	Eugene Randolph, Dorian Burton	Sounds Like Searchers	2:58
25.	"If I Could Find Someone"	Chris Curtis	Sounds Like Searchers	2:08
26.	"It's Time"	John McNally	Take Me for What I'm Worth	2:34
27.	"I'll Be Doggone"	Smokey Robinson, Warren Moore, Marv Tarplin	Take Me for What I'm Worth	2:54
28.	"Each Time"	Jackie DeShannon	Take Me for What I'm Worth	2:46
29.	"You Can't Lie To a Liar"	Frank Churchill, Lionel Hampton	Take Me for What I'm Worth	2:22
30.	"Four Strong Winds"	Ian Tyson	Take Me for What I'm Worth	3:07

CD 3 - Rarities
No.	Title	Writer(s)	Source	Length
1.	"Tausend Nadelstiche (Needles and Pins in German)"	Sonny Bono, Jack Nitzsche	A-side single, 1964, Germany	2:14
2.	"Süß ist sie (Sugar and Spice in German)"	Fred Nightingale	A-side single, 1964, Germany	2:17
3.	"Bye Bye Johnny"	Chuck Berry	Unreleased, 1964	2:47
4.	"I Don't Want to Go On Without You"	Bert Berns, Jerry Wexler	Alternate take, 1964	3:26
5.	"I (Who Have Nothing)"	Carlo Donida, Jerry Leiber, Mike Stoller	Unreleased, 1964	2:48
6.	"Shame Shame Shame"	Jimmy Reed	Unreleased, 1964	2:42
7.	"Someday We're Gonna Love Again"	Sharon McMahan	Alternate take, 1964	2:06
8.	"Verzeih' My Love (Goodbye My Love in German)"	Robert Mosley, Lamar Simington, Leroy Swearingen	A-side single, 1965, Germany	2:55
9.	"I'll Be Doggone"	Smokey Robinson, Warren Moore, Marv Tarplin	Alternate take, 1965	3:02
10.	"Once Upon A Time"	Charles Strouse, Lee Adams	Unreleased, 1965	2:08
11.	"Sweet Little Sixteen"	Chuck Berry	BBC Saturday Swings (7. 5. 1965)	1:58
12.	"Blowin' in the Wind"	Bob Dylan	BBC Saturday Club (14. 5. 1966)	2:12
13.	"Medley: See See Rider/Jenny Take A Ride"	Gertrude "Ma" Rainey / Bob Crewe, Enotris Johnson, Richard Penniman	BBC Saturday Club (11. 2. 1967)	2:32
14.	"Goodbye, So Long"	Ike Turner	BBC Saturday Club (11. 2. 1967)	2:06
15.	"I'll Be Loving You"	Chris Curtis, Frank Allen, John McNally, Mike Pender	BBC Saturday Club (25. 3. 1967)	2:51
16.	"I Don't Believe It"	Robery, Charles	BBC Saturday Club (6. 5. 1967)	2:32
17.	"Stage Door"	Gerry Goffin, Carole King	A-side single, Tony Jackson & The Vibrations	2:25
18.	"Watch Your Step"	Bobby Parker	A-side single, Tony Jackson & The Vibrations	2:45
19.	"Aggravation"	Joe South	A-side single, Chris Curtis	2:01
20.	"Innocent Victim"	Steve Thompson	Unreleased 1983	4:01
21.	"Good Way To Fall"	Frank Allen	Unreleased 1983	2:57
22.	"New Heart"	Joey Arreguin, Rick Riso	Unreleased 1983	3:52
23.	"I Don't Want To Be The One"	Steve Thompson	A-side single, 1982	3:53
24.	"Hollywood"	Frank Allen, John McNally, Mike Pender	B-side "I Don't Want To Be The One", 1982	3:50

== Personnel ==
The Searchers

- Mike Pender – lead guitar, lead vocals, backing vocals
- John McNally – rhythm guitar, lead and backing vocals
- Tony Jackson – bass guitar, lead and backing vocals
- Chris Curtis – drums, lead and backing vocals
- Frank Allen – bass guitar, lead and backing vocals
- John Blunt – drums
- Billy Adamson – drums

Tony Jackson and the Vibrations

- Tony Jackson – bass guitar, lead vocals
- Ian Buisel – guitar
- Denis Thompson – bass guitar
- Martin Raymond – organ
- Paul Francis – drums

Chris Curtis (studio band)

- Chris Curtis – vocals
- Jimmy Page – guitar
- Joe Moretti – guitar
- John Paul Jones – bass guitar
- Vic Flick – guitar
- Bobby Graham – drums

Additional musicians and production

- Tony Hatch – producer, piano
- Peter Collins – producer
- John Verity – producer
- Bob Henrit – session drummer
