= The Searchers Meet the Rattles =

1965 live album by the Searchers

The Searchers Meet The Rattles

Live album by The Searchers
- Released: January 1965
- Recorded: 1963
- Genre: Rock/Pop
- Label: Mercury

The Searchers US chronology
This Is Us (1964)	The Searchers Meet The Rattles (1965)	The New Searchers LP (Chris, John, Mike, Frank) (1965)

The Searchers Meet The Rattles is the second US live album by English rock band The Searchers (side 1) and the first US LP by German rock band The Rattles (side 2). The Searchers recorded their set in March 1963 at the German Star-Club during their Hamburg residency. The album contains songs that Mercury Records had withheld from its predecessor Hear! Hear!. Songs by The Rattles are taken from their album Twist Im Star-Club Hamburg released in Germany on Philips Records in 1963. The only other country that released The Searchers Meet The Rattles was Canada.

== Overview ==
The Searchers played 126 appearances at The Star-Club, The Rattles 154. Mike Pender said: "Playing at the Star-Club and mixing acts like the Everly Brothers, Gene Vincent and Jerry Lee Lewis gave us great confidence." The first US live album by The Searchers Hear! Hear! went to No. 120 on Billboard Top 200 in the summer of 1964. Mercury quickly followed up with another LP made of the band's early live catalogue recorded before the group's international success, including the UK Top 50 hit "Sweet Nothin's" (otherwise best known by Brenda Lee). Although record company still had seven unreleased tracks in their pockets, they used only five of them, omitted "Beautiful Dreamer" (originally issued on the German various artists LP Twist im Star-Club Hamburg) and "Always It's You" (from the Searchers' German LP Sweets For My Sweet). The Searchers Meet The Rattles LP was released in mono (Mercury MG-20994) and then fake stereo in January 1965 (Mercury SR-60994). Surprisingly, LP included one song from the Searchers' studio catalogue owned by competitive Pye Records, the song "It's All Been a Dream", B-side of the first UK hit single "Sweets for My Sweet".

== Track listing ==
Side 1 – Performed by The Searchers
No.	Title	Writer(s)	Lead vocals	Length
1.	"Sweet Nothin's"	Ronnie Self	Tony Jackson	2:18
2.	"Shakin' All Over"	Johnny Kidd	Tony Jackson	2:22
3.	"Sweet Little Sixteen"	Chuck Berry	Mike Pender	2:55
4.	"Don't You Know"	David Box, Ernie Hall	Mike Pender	1:55
5.	"Maybellene"	Chuck Berry	Chris Curtis	1:55
6.	"It's All Been a Dream"	Chris Curtis	Tony Jackson	1:43

Side 2 – Performed by The Rattles
No.	Title	Writer(s)	Lead vocals	Length
1.	"The Stomp"	Fred Sledge Smith, Cliff Goldsmith	Achim Reichel	2:12
2.	"Zip-a-Dee-Doo-Dah"	Allie Wrubel, Ray Gilbert	Achim Reichel	2:13
3.	"Bye Bye Johnny"	Chuck Berry	Herbert Hildebrandt	2:13
4.	"Twist And Shout"	Phil Medley, Bert Russell	Achim Reichel	2:17
5.	"Dream Baby (How Long Must I Dream)"	Cindy Walker	Achim Reichel	2:15
6.	"Hello"	Otto Ortwein, Werner Sondhof	Herbert Hildebrandt	2:15

== Personnel ==
The Searchers

- Mike Pender – lead guitar, lead vocals, backing vocals
- John McNally – rhythm guitar, lead and backing vocals
- Tony Jackson – bass guitar, lead and backing vocals
- Chris Curtis – drums, lead and backing vocals

The Rattles

- Achim Reichel – lead guitar, vocals
- Herbert Hildebrandt – bass, vocals
- Hans Joachim Kreutzfeld – rhythm guitar, vocals
- Dieter Sadlowsky – drums (except The Stomp and Zip-a-Dee-Doo-Dah, drums: Reinhard Tarrach)
