= John McNally (musician) =

English guitarist (born 1941)

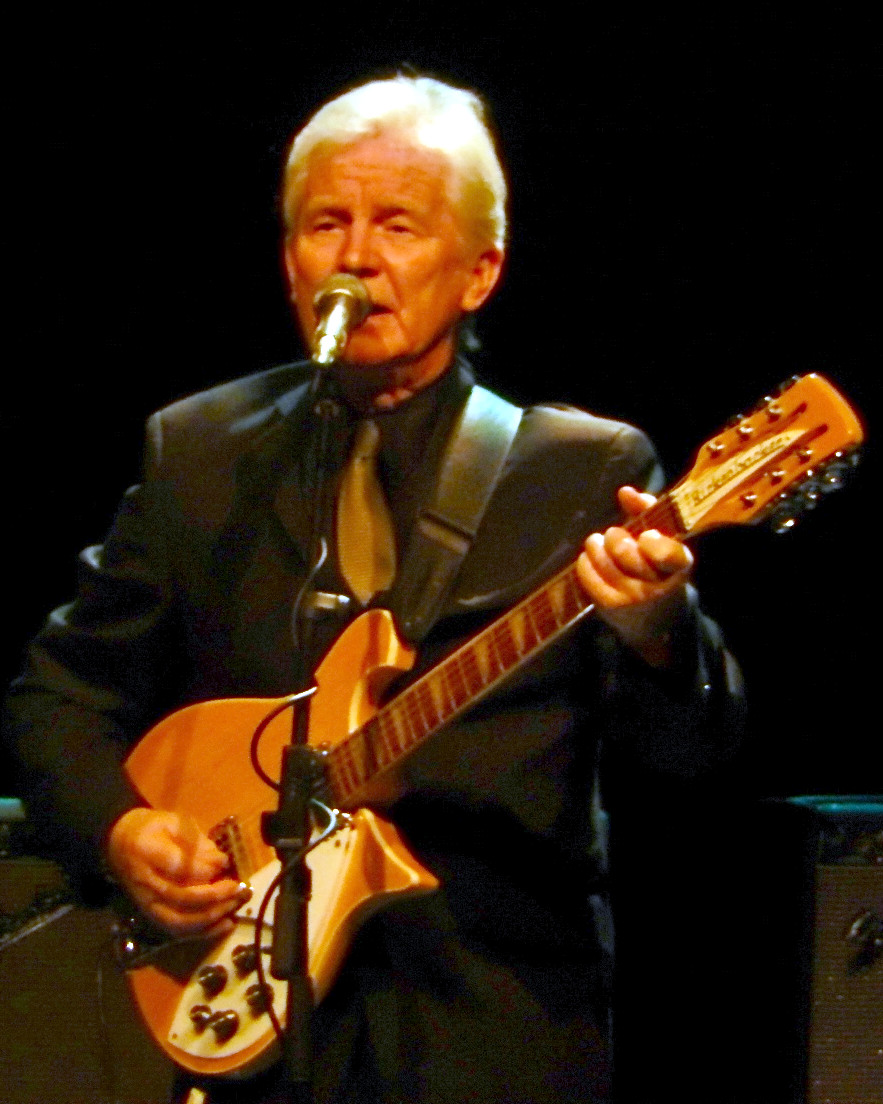
- McNally in 2015, performing with his Rickenbacker 620/12 guitar.

Background information
- Born: 30 August 1941 (age 85); Walton, Liverpool, England
- Genres: Rock; skiffle; rock and roll; pop
- Occupation: Musician
- Instruments: Vocals, guitar
- Years active: 1955–2019; 2023–present
- Formerly of: The Searchers
- Spouse: Mary McNally (m. 1964)

John McNally (born 30 August 1941) is an English guitarist. He was a member of The Searchers, a band he formed in 1959, who were a big part of the Mersey sound in the early 1960s. He was the longest-serving member of the group, touring in the band from 1955 until their retirement in 2019 as well as their 2023 farewell tour and their final show at the Glastonbury Festival in June 2025.

== Early life ==
McNally was born in Walton, Liverpool. His love for music first came as a child, when his older brother, Frank, would bring back records from the United States while in the Navy:

First of all he'd bring country stuff like Eddy Arnold and Hank Williams, the next minute it was Johnny Cash, then Gene Vincent, Elvis, and Eddie Cochran.

He started to learn guitar as a child when Georgie McGee, a friend of his older brother, taught him a few guitar chords.

== The Searchers ==
In 1955, following a suggestion from friend Tony West (1937-2010), McNally formed The Army Generations. The band started off playing skiffle and, after an everchanging line-up which resulted in just McNally as the sole founding member still in the band, broke off into a new band in 1959 containing McNally, Mike Pendergast (Mike Pender), Tony Jackson, Chris Crummey (Chris Curtis) and William Francis Beck (Johnny Sandon). The new band was named the Searchers after the 1956 film of the same name. Sandon left in 1960 and the four remaining members proceeded to tour in Hamburg, Germany.

The band signed to Pye Records in 1963:

Everyone was being signed up (to a record label) and we didn't want to miss the boat. We wanted to make a demo at the Iron Door (club), organising a company to nip in with all the gear. So we did 11 tracks and he sent them all around the companies, and luckily Tony Hatch at Pye Records picked up on it. We were on our way back to the Star-Club to do another stint when he asked us to come and record Sweets for my Sweet, which we did ahead of the ferry.

Their first single, a cover of The Drifters’ 1961 song Sweets for My Sweet, went to number one.

Their debut album, Meet The Searchers, was released in August 1963. The album primarily consisted of covers. Their cover of The Clovers Love Potion No. 9 went to number two on the US Cash Box and their version of Pete Seeger's modern folk-style song Where Have All the Flowers Gone? went to No. 22 and stayed for 21 weeks. Other hits by the group included Needles and Pins, Don't Throw Your Love Away and When You Walk in the Room. The Searchers became one of the first successful Beat music bands and were one of the most popular groups in the British Invasion in the early 1960s. The band's last album released during their 1960s era was Take Me for What I'm Worth, released in November 1965. In total the Searchers released nine albums between 1963 and 1988.

In the band’s earlier years McNally rarely sang lead or co-lead on their releases or performances, with singing mainly done by guitarist Mike Pender, bassists Tony Jackson and Frank Allen or drummer Chris Curtis. However John did slightly contribute, singing the line "Now looky here" in their version of Don and Dewey's Farmer John, from their debut album Meet The Searchers. McNally has since contributed to lead vocals on stage, such as singing lead on their live performances of Mr Tambourine Man.

Unlike the other members of The Searchers who played in other bands and even formed ones of their own, McNally has never recorded with any act other than the Searchers.

Following the departures of Tony Jackson in August 1964, Chris Curtis in mid 1966 and Mike Pender in December 1985, McNally was the last original member of the classic 1960s line-up. Shortly before the band were set to perform in the Sixties Gold Tour in September 2017, McNally suffered a stroke and took a three-month break from touring.

McNally remained with the band over 60 years, touring alongside Frank Allen, who replaced Tony Jackson in August 1964, until what seemed to be their last concert on 31 March 2019. It was announced on the band's website in 2021 that they would undertake a further farewell tour in 2023. The tour contained McNally, Allen, Spencer James (who had replaced Pender in 1985), and new member Richie Burns, and started on 13 April, at the Wimborne Tivoli in Wimborne, Dorset, and ended on 17 June 2023, at the Philharmonic Hall in Liverpool, where the band originated from.

However the band returned on stage in June 2025, when they performed at the Glastonbury Festival.

== Charity ==
In November 2008, McNally sold a grand piano he bought some time in the 1960s, who the likes of Gerry Marsden and Billy Butler had played on, for a Charitable organization. The auctioning of the piano was shot and aired on Dickinson’s Real Deal, and was sold at Dunes Leisure Centre, in Southport. The piano was sold for £520 to a family living in Preston, Lancashire, for family member Bob Young, who had been a member of the band Sweeney Todd.

In March 2009, McNally organised a Gala Moulin Rouge Ball to raise money for Wirral Autistic Society.

== Equipment ==
McNally has used a wide range of guitars during his career. John has been known to use a Rickenbacker 360/12, a Hofner Club 60, and a Fender Stratocaster.

== Influences ==
McNally has said that he was first influenced by country singers like Hank Williams, Johnny Cash, and Hank Snow but after playing at the Star-Club in Hamburg, Germany, and specifically, playing with Fats Domino at the club, his music took a different course towards soul and rhythm & blues.

In his late teens, Buddy Holly was a great influence on McNally, and when Holly performed at the Philharmonic Hall in Liverpool on 29 March 1958, McNally had plans on going to see him, but was unable to due to his job; Mike Pender stated that he saw Holly at the performance, but does not remember a lot about it. Bert Weedon's Play in a Day Guide to Modern Guitar Playing book has also been said to be an influence on McNally.

In 2006, McNally received a telephone call from a band in Manchester, who asked him to meet him; upon going to see the band, he was surprised by the likes of Bruce Springsteen and Nils Lofgren, who had all claimed that McNally and the Searchers had inspired and influenced them.

== Personal life ==
McNally attended St Mary's College. John McNally has been married to Mary McNally since 1964. Prior to working full time as a musician, McNally worked at the Alfred Holt’s Blue Funnel line, where his brother also worked, doing office work and delivering mail. Since he was a child, John has enjoyed watching and playing football.

McNally still resides in his hometown of Liverpool, but lives in the area of Blundellsands, instead of his birth area of Walton:

I never felt the need to move out of Merseyside, I didn't like the London scene in the 1960s so I never stayed. A couple of the lads (Searchers members) did like it and went the wrong way. They got involved with drugs and stuff.

=== Health ===
As a child McNally had tuberculosis and learned the guitar around the same time, often saying that had he not contracted TB he would not have bothered learning. Shortly before the band were set to perform in the Sixties Gold Tour in September 2017, McNally suffered a stroke and took a three-month break from touring.

== Discography ==
=== With The Searchers ===
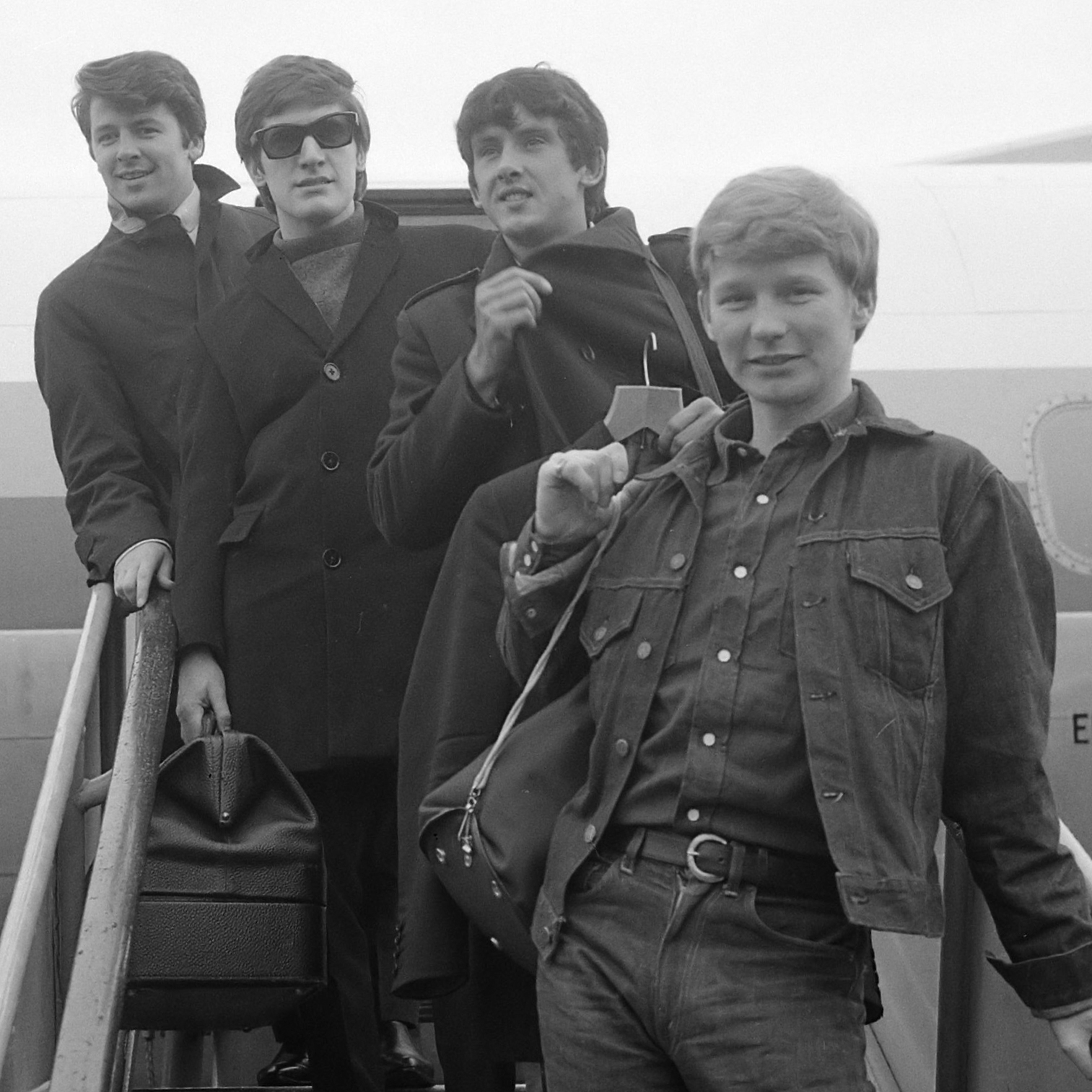
The Searchers (McNally at right) in 1965

==== Studio albums ====
Album details	Year
Meet The Searchers: Released: August 1963; Label: Pye Records (NPL 18086); Format: LP	1963
Sweets For My Sweet – The Searchers At The Star-Club Hamburg: Released: October 1963; Label: Philips Records (P48 052); Format: LP	1963
Sugar and Spice: Released: 16 October 1963; Label: Pye Records (NPL 18089); Format: LP	1963
It's the Searchers: Released: May 1964; Label: Pye Records (NPL 18092); Format: LP	1964
Sounds Like Searchers: Released: 19 March 1965; Label: Pye Records (NPL 18111); Format: LP	1965
Take Me for What I'm Worth: Released: November 1965; Label: Pye Records (NPL 18120 / NSPL 18120); Format: LP	1965
Second Take: Released: November 1972; Label: RCA Victor (SF 8298); Format: LP	1972
Searchers: Released: October 1979; Label: Sire Records (SRK 6082); Format: LP	1979
Play For Today: Released: April 1981; Label: Sire Records (SRK 3523); Format: LP	1981
Hungry Hearts: Released: 1988; Label: Coconut Records (LP 209459/ CD 259459); Format: LP, CD	1988

==== Singles ====
Title (A-side)	B-side	Year
"Sweets for My Sweet" (originally recorded by The Drifters)	"It's All Been a Dream"	1963
"Sweet Nothin's" (originally recorded by Brenda Lee)	"What'd I Say"	1963
"Sugar and Spice" (original version/first release)	"Saints and Searchers"	1963
"Needles and Pins" (originally recorded by Jackie DeShannon)	"Saturday Night Out" (UK and US 2nd pressings) "Ain't That Just Like Me" (US original pressings)	1964
"Süß ist sie" ("Sugar And Spice" in German)	"Liebe" ("Money" in German)	1964
"Tausend Nadelstiche" ("Needles and Pins" in German)	"Farmer John" (in German)	1964
"Ain't That Just Like Me" (originally recorded by The Coasters)	"Ain't Gonna Kiss Ya"	1964
"Don't Throw Your Love Away" (originally recorded by The Orlons)	"I Pretend I'm with You"	1964
"Someday We're Gonna Love Again" (originally recorded by Barbara Lewis)	"No One Else Could Love Me"	1964
"When You Walk in the Room" (originally recorded by Jackie DeShannon)	"I'll Be Missing You"	1964
"Love Potion No. 9" (originally recorded by The Clovers)	"Hi-Heel Sneakers"	1964
"What Have They Done to the Rain" (originally recorded by Malvina Reynolds)	"This Feeling Inside"	1964
"Magic Potion" (originally recorded by Lou Johnson) Note: Australia only	"Everything You Do"	1965
"Bumble Bee" (originally recorded by LaVern Baker)	"Everything You Do" (US first pressings) "A Tear Fell" (US later pressings)	1965
"I Don't Want to Go On Without You" (originally recorded by The Drifters)	"A Tear Fell"	1965
"Goodbye My Love" (originally recorded by Jimmy Hughes) (US single shown as "Goodbye My Lover Goodbye")	"Till I Met You"	1965
"Verzeih' My Love" ("Goodbye My Love" in German)	"Wenn ich dich seh'" ("When You Walk In The Room" in German)	1965
"He's Got No Love"	"So Far Away"	1965
"When I Get Home" (originally recorded by Bobby Darin)	"I'm Never Coming Back"	1965
"Don't You Know Why"	"You Can't Lie to a Liar"	1965
"Take Me for What I'm Worth" (originally recorded by P. F. Sloan)	"Too Many Miles"	1965
"Take It or Leave It" (originally recorded by The Rolling Stones)	"Don't Hide It Away"	1966
"Have You Ever Loved Somebody?" (originally recorded by The Hollies)	"It's Just the Way (Love Will Come and Go)"	1966
"Popcorn Double Feature"	"Lovers"	1967
"Western Union" (originally recorded by The Five Americans)	"I'll Cry Tomorrow"	1967
"Second Hand Dealer"	"Crazy Dreams"	1967
"Umbrella Man"	"Over the Weekend"	1968
"Somebody Shot the Lollipop Man" (Released under the pseudonym "Pasha")	"Pussy Willow Dragon"	1969
"Shoot 'Em Up Baby" (originally recorded by Andy Kim)	"Suzanna"	1969
"Kinky Kathy Abernathy"	"Suzanna"	1969
"Desdemona"	"The World Is Waiting for Tomorrow"	1971
"Love Is Everywhere"	"And a Button"	1971
"Sing Singer Sing"	"Come On Back to Me"	1972
"Needles and Pins" (re-recording)	"When You Walk in the Room"/ "Come On Back to Me"	1972
"Solitaire" (originally recorded by Neil Sedaka)	"Spicks and Specks"	1973
"Vahevala" (originally recorded by Loggins & Messina)	"Madman"	1973
"Hearts in Her Eyes" (given to the group by The Records)	"Don't Hang On"	1979
"It's Too Late"	"This Kind of Love Affair" (UK) "Don't Hang On" (US)	1979
"Love's Melody" (originally recorded by Ducks Deluxe)	"Changing" (UK) "Little Bit of Heaven" (US)	1981
"Another Night"	"Back to the War"	1981
"I Don't Want to Be the One"	"Hollywood"	1982

==== EPs ====
Title	Year
Ain't Gonna Kiss Ya: Label: Pye Records (NEP 24177)	1963
Sweets For My Sweet: Label: Pye Records (NEP 24183)	1963
Hungry For Love: Label: Pye Records (NEP 24184)	1964
Les Searchers Chantent En Français: Label: Disques Vogue (PNV 24 121) Note: France only	1964
The Searchers Play The System: Label: Pye Records (NEP 24201)	1964
When You Walk In The Room: Label: Pye Records (NEP 24204)	1965
Bumble Bee: Label: Pye Records (NEP 24218)	1965
Searchers '65: Label: Pye Records (NEP 24222)	1965
Four By Four: Label: Pye Records (NEP 24228)	1965
Take Me For What I'm Worth: Label: Pye Records (NEP 24263)	1966

== See also ==
- List of Rickenbacker players
- List of guitarists
