= Chris Curtis (musician) =

British musician (1941–2005)

- Curtis in the late 1960s

Background information
- Born: Christopher Crummey; 26 August 1941; Oldham, Lancashire, England
- Died: 28 February 2005 (aged 63) Liverpool, England
- Occupation: Musician
- Instruments: Drums; vocals
- Years active: 1960s–1970s
- Formerly of: The Searchers, Roundabout

Chris Curtis (born Christopher Crummey; 26 August 1941 – 28 February 2005) was an English musician. He was best known for being a member the 1960s beat band The Searchers. He originated the concept behind Deep Purple and formed the band in its original incarnation of 'Roundabout'.

== Early years ==
Curtis was born in Oldham, Lancashire, on 26 August 1942. He came to Liverpool when he was four, and went to primary school where he met Mike Prendergast. He taught himself how to play the piano on the family instrument at 30 Florida Street in Bootle. He passed the 11-plus and went to St Mary's College, Crosby, where he was taught violin although he preferred the double bass.

His father bought him a drum set during his late teens when he left school. He learned to play in his spare time, when he was not selling prams at Swift's Furniture store at Stanley Road, Liverpool. He developed a fascination for American music and particularly liked Fats Domino. He also grew the unusually long hair that would be his trademark in the early years.

== The Searchers ==
In 1960 he met Mike Prendergast soon after Norman McGarry, the Searchers' second drummer, had left the band. He accepted an invitation to join the band for a gig at Wilson Hall, Garston, and became the seventh member of The Searchers, replacing McGarry to join John McNally, Prendergast and Tony Jackson. He adopted the name Chris Curtis after Jackson described him thus in a press interview, choosing the name from a Lee Curtis poster to avoid saying 'crummey'.

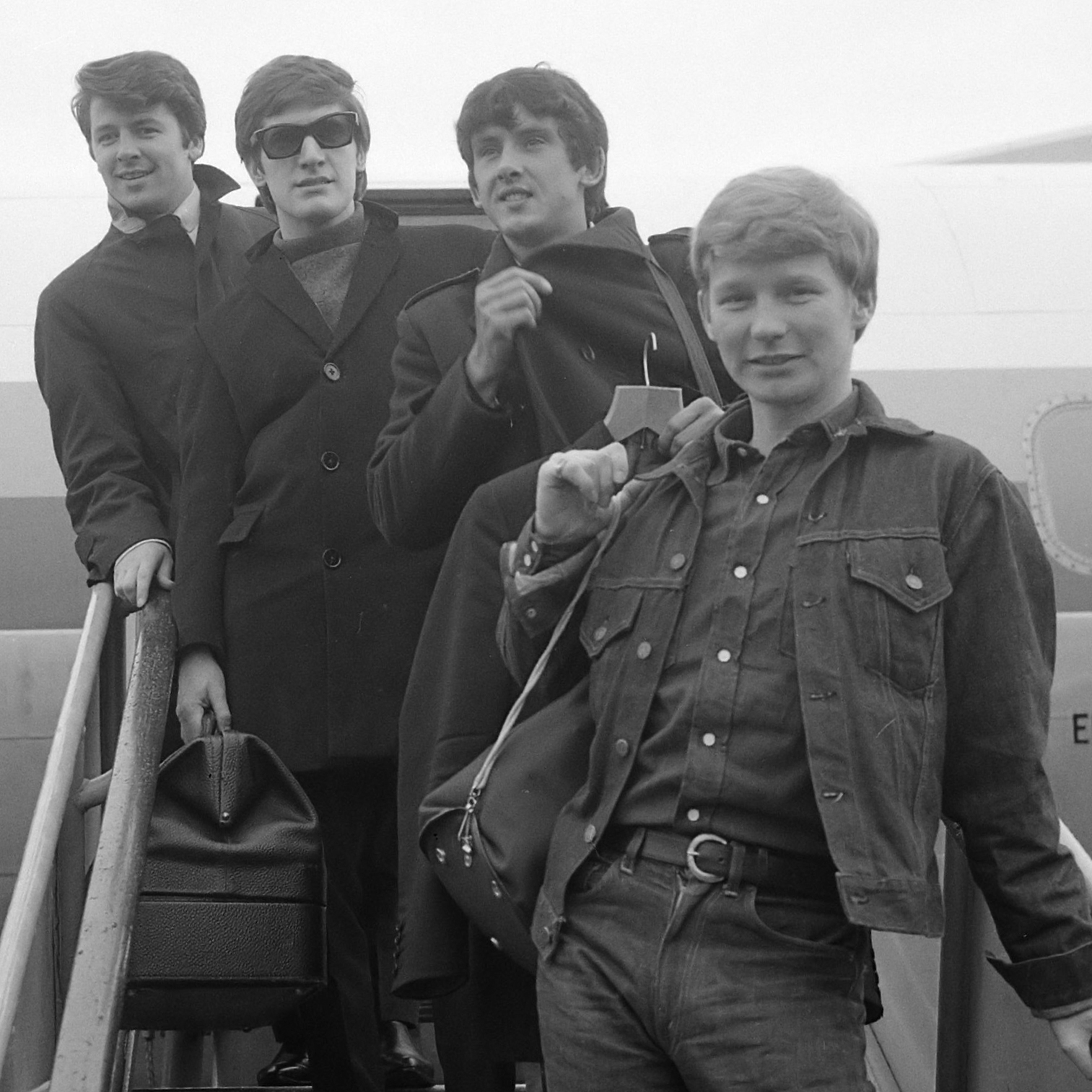
Chris Curtis (second from left) as part of The Searchers in 1965

For the next six years Curtis was an essential part of the Searchers' sound and contributed to the band's characteristic vocal harmonies with his distinctive voice, blending particularly well with the high-pitched voice of early band-mate Tony Jackson. Perhaps the finest example of this can be found in their rendition of "Ain't That Just Like Me", where Curtis sings the lead vocal, and Jackson chimes in with the chorus.

As well as playing drums, including the bongos, he introduced other forms of percussion to the band's sound, among them castanets, cowbells, and Spanish bells. The band's members took turns singing lead vocals, which allowed them to give longer and more frequent sets than most of their competitors. This would later contribute to Curtis' drug abuse, taking them both to stay awake and induce sleep.

The Searchers briefly rivaled the Beatles for popularity, having international hits with "Needles and Pins", "Sugar and Spice" and "Don't Throw Your Love Away".

Curtis wrote most of the band's original songs, and was constantly seeking obscure songs by other artists for them to record. Many of his finds were B-sides discovered in Brian Epstein's NEMS record shop, and upstairs in another record shop near the furniture store where he worked.

He was a manic individual given to great enthusiasm but prone to voicing trenchant views without considering the effect upon others. He antagonised Ray McFall, the owner of the Cavern Club, by saying that it was "a dreadful place", "stinky and sweaty".

Curtis rarely mixed socially with his fellow band members, preferring his own company. George Harrison referred to him as 'Mad Henry' but John Lennon indulged him.

A devout Roman Catholic throughout his life, Curtis would repair to a convent church in the early hours of Sunday morning after finishing the Saturday night set at the Star Club, St. Pauli, near Hamburg. At that time Curtis still had long hair, which was unusual for the time. He cut his hair when the band became popular, deciding that it would put off some potential record buyers.

Curtis met his girlfriend, Annette Kuntze, in St. Pauli, and she returned to live with him in Knightsbridge, London. She took photographs for some of the Pye record sleeves and was responsible for the sullen look affected by the band.

Another visitor to the flat was Jackie DeShannon, who co-wrote several Searchers songs with Sharon Sheeley, whom she introduced to Curtis.

The Searchers returned to the Star Club to fulfil a prior booking after they had become successful in England. "I found "Love Potion Number 9" in a back-street, second-hand shop in Hamburg." Curtis later said. "I saw this 45 with a triangle in the middle and I thought: I've got to have it, it’s such a weird looking record. I took my little portable electric record-player to Germany and I played "Love Potion Number 9" and I thought: This is excellent."

Curtis left The Searchers in mid 1966, after an extensive tour of the Philippines, Hong Kong and Australia, with the Rolling Stones. Accounts of the break-up differ, but there were some significant incidents during the tour and Curtis had become unreliable. Curtis hated Australia and he was abusing a variety of substances to the point where he fell off the stage at one venue. The other members of the band emptied his stash of drugs down the lavatory.

== After the Searchers ==
When he left the Searchers, Curtis rang his friend, Klas Burling, who was in charge of the Swedish radio station for whom the band had recorded sessions in 1964. Burling told him to come to Sweden to get himself straight.

Upon his return to London from Sweden, Curtis recorded his only solo single, the Joe South song "Aggravation" (backed with "Have I Done Something Wrong?"). The other musicians included Jimmy Page, Joe Moretti, John Paul Jones, and Vic Flick & Bobby Graham on that record. "I did my Tom Jones hard rock voice and I was really loud," Curtis would say later. Though "Aggravation" failed to chart in the UK, it reached number 9 on Tio i Topp in Sweden. Although he recorded a cover version of the Walker Brothers's (Baby) You Don't Have to Tell Me, he never released another single.

In 1965 Curtis had written and produced "Snakes and Snails" for Alma Cogan with all the musicians who had played on "Aggravation". Now, Vicki Wickham, the editor and producer of Ready Steady Go! asked Curtis to produce the sound for the Otis Redding Special, which aired on 16 September 1966. She also introduced him to Tony Edwards, a clothier working London's West End, who aspired to be part of the music business and was managing the singer and model, Ayshea.

At the same time Curtis produced recordings of Paul and Barry Ryan for their stepfather, Harold Davidson. Graham Nash had given him the song "Have You Ever Loved Somebody?" and he got them to sing it backed by Ten Feet, a Welsh group whom he was also producing. Pye Records asked Curtis to delay the release of the Ryans' version so that the Searchers could release it. Curtis did not want to help his old band, however, and with the help of Harold Davidson the Ryans released the single in the week of 12 September 1966 and played it on 'Ready, Steady, Go' on 7 October. Curtis also wrote "Night Time" for the Ryans with his friend Sharon Sheeley, former girlfriend of Eddie Cochran, and they collaborated on several other songs.

== Roundabout ==
In 1967, a year after their first meeting, Curtis contacted Edwards. "From out of the blue, Chris rang me from Liverpool. He said, 'I'd like you to be my manager. I'll teach you everything. Brian Epstein's dead; you can be the next Brian Epstein'. That hooked me," recalled Edwards.

Curtis came back to London at the beginning of 1968 and moved into a low-rent flat rented by Jon Lord, whom he had recently met at one of Vicki Wickham's parties. Curtis was planning his return to performing but he had yet to assemble his new band. In that first conversation with Lord he said, "I've got this concept."

Lord was eager to listen; his previous band had changed their name from The Artwoods to St Valentine's Day Massacre in a desperate effort to cash in on the gangsters craze that followed the film Bonnie and Clyde. Their cover of Bing Crosby's "Brother, Can You Spare a Dime?", released at the end of 1967, had been a failure and he had agreed to make a one-month tour with The Flower Pot Men, a band promoting the hit "Let's Go to San Francisco".

Curtis's concept was a band with a core of three members: Curtis, Lord and Robbie Hewlett. The other musicians would be engaged whenever the core felt like it. "They would jump on and off the roundabout. But I left that party in a new band, Roundabout." said Lord.

Curtis would arrange for Daimler limousines to taxi him about and was charging the cost to Tony Edwards. Edwards realised that he had made a mistake agreeing to manage Curtis but he liked what he saw of Jon Lord. And Lord was also having problems with Curtis, who had started to use LSD. Lord returned from a few days away with The Flower Pot Men to find the entire flat covered in aluminium foil. Everything; even the furniture and the light bulbs.

Curtis moved out soon after this but he did tell Lord that he had a guitarist in mind for Roundabout. Curtis arranged for Ritchie Blackmore and his girlfriend to fly over from Hamburg, Germany and meet Tony Edwards. The meeting was a success for Blackmore, Edwards and Lord but they had no room for the erratic Curtis. They changed their name to Deep Purple and their first single was Joe South's "Hush", which Curtis had been playing in Lord's flat for months.

== After music ==
Curtis left the music industry and joined the Inland Revenue in 1969. He found the change difficult but he liked his new colleagues and he stayed there for nineteen years. He took early retirement in 1988 suffering a systemic illness that he ascribed to sick building syndrome.

In the mid 1970s he made some demos with Bernard Whitty, a Liverpool producer, to whom he had been introduced by one of his colleagues at the Inland Revenue. Alan Willey was an accountant who played guitar semi professionally. He asked Curtis to join his band, Western Union, but Curtis started drinking heavily and was asked to leave. Ultimately, however, nothing came of the demos.

In retirement he was active in his parish church of Holy Rosary in Sefton, Liverpool, where he sang folk music and rock and roll to attract younger worshippers. He also sang frequently with a karaoke machine at Cooper's Emporium and the Old Roan pub near the home he shared with his mother when the Searchers first started. Many of his audience had no idea who he was, but he had kept his skill and delighted to tell of someone stopping him in the supermarket to say how much they had liked his singing at the Old Roan.

In 1998 he gave his first interview in thirty years; to Spencer Leigh for BBC Radio Merseyside. Some years later he started appearing weekly with live musicians for the Merseycats charity at the Marconi club in Huyton. His driver for these evenings was Mike Pender's cousin, Michael Prendergast, but he never revisited the old Searchers' songs. On 13 April 2003 he gave another interview to Spencer Leigh for BBC Radio Merseyside to discuss the 'new' Searchers' albums, The Searchers at the Iron Door, The Searchers at the Star-Club and the Swedish Radio Sessions.

He died at home on 28 February 2005 at the age of 63.

== Discography ==
=== With The Searchers ===
==== Studio albums ====
Album details	Year
Meet The Searchers: Released: August 1963; Label: Pye Records (NPL 18086); Format: LP	1963
Sweets For My Sweet – The Searchers At The Star-Club Hamburg: Released: October 1963; Label: Philips Records (P48 052); Format: LP	1963
Sugar and Spice: Released: 16 October 1963; Label: Pye Records (NPL 18089); Format: LP	1963
It's the Searchers: Released: May 1964; Label: Pye Records (NPL 18092); Format: LP	1964
Sounds Like Searchers: Released: 19 March 1965; Label: Pye Records (NPL 18111); Format: LP	1965
Take Me for What I'm Worth: Released: November 1965; Label: Pye Records (NPL 18120 / NSPL 18120); Format: LP	1965

==== Singles ====
Title (A-side)	B-side	Year
"Sweets for My Sweet" (originally recorded by The Drifters)	"It's All Been a Dream"	1963
"Sweet Nothin's" (originally recorded by Brenda Lee)	"What'd I Say"	1963
"Sugar and Spice" (original version/first release)	"Saints and Searchers"	1963
"Needles and Pins" (originally recorded by Jackie DeShannon)	"Saturday Night Out" (UK and US 2nd pressings) "Ain't That Just Like Me" (US original pressings)	1964
"Süß ist sie" ("Sugar And Spice" in German)	"Liebe" ("Money" in German)	1964
"Tausend Nadelstiche" ("Needles and Pins" in German)	"Farmer John" (in German)	1964
"Ain't That Just Like Me" (originally recorded by The Coasters)	"Ain't Gonna Kiss Ya"	1964
"Don't Throw Your Love Away" (originally recorded by The Orlons)	"I Pretend I'm with You"	1964
"Someday We're Gonna Love Again" (originally recorded by Barbara Lewis)	"No One Else Could Love Me"	1964
"When You Walk in the Room" (originally recorded by Jackie DeShannon)	"I'll Be Missing You"	1964
"Love Potion No. 9" (originally recorded by The Clovers)	"Hi-Heel Sneakers"	1964
"What Have They Done to the Rain" (originally recorded by Malvina Reynolds)	"This Feeling Inside"	1964
"Magic Potion" (originally recorded by Lou Johnson) Note: Australia only	"Everything You Do"	1965
"Bumble Bee" (originally recorded by LaVern Baker)	"Everything You Do" (US first pressings) "A Tear Fell" (US later pressings)	1965
"I Don't Want to Go On Without You" (originally recorded by The Drifters)	"A Tear Fell"	1965
"Goodbye My Love" (originally recorded by Jimmy Hughes) (US single shown as "Goodbye My Lover Goodbye")	"Till I Met You"	1965
"Verzeih' My Love" ("Goodbye My Love" in German)	"Wenn ich dich seh'" ("When You Walk In The Room" in German)	1965
"He's Got No Love"	"So Far Away"	1965
"When I Get Home" (originally recorded by Bobby Darin)	"I'm Never Coming Back"	1965
"Don't You Know Why"	"You Can't Lie to a Liar"	1965
"Take Me for What I'm Worth" (originally recorded by P. F. Sloan)	"Too Many Miles"	1965
"Take It or Leave It" (originally recorded by The Rolling Stones)	"Don't Hide It Away"	1966
"Have You Ever Loved Somebody?" (originally recorded by The Hollies)	"It's Just the Way (Love Will Come and Go)"	1966

==== EPs ====
Title	Year
Ain't Gonna Kiss Ya: Label: Pye Records (NEP 24177)	1963
Sweets For My Sweet: Label: Pye Records (NEP 24183)	1963
Hungry For Love: Label: Pye Records (NEP 24184)	1964
Les Searchers Chantent En Français: Label: Disques Vogue (PNV 24 121) Note: France only	1964
The Searchers Play The System: Label: Pye Records (NEP 24201)	1964
When You Walk In The Room: Label: Pye Records (NEP 24204)	1965
Bumble Bee: Label: Pye Records (NEP 24218)	1965
Searchers '65: Label: Pye Records (NEP 24222)	1965
Four By Four: Label: Pye Records (NEP 24228)	1965
Take Me For What I'm Worth: Label: Pye Records (NEP 24263)	1966

== Songwriting ==
- "No One Else Could Love Me"
- "Another Heart Is Broken (in the Game of Life)"
- "He's Got No Love"
- "I'm Your Lovin' Man"
- "Snakes and Snails"
- "Night-time" (with Sharon Sheeley)
- Travelers (Theme of Discovery Travelers)
