= Tony Jackson (singer) =

English musician (1938–2003)

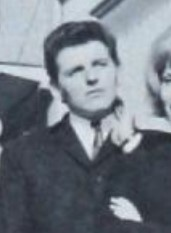
- Jackson in 1964

Background information
- Born: Anthony Paul Jackson; 16 July 1938; Dingle, Liverpool, England, UK
- Died: 18 August 2003 (aged 65) Nottingham, England, UK
- Occupation: Musician
- Years active: 1959–1967; 1980s–1996
- Labels: Pye Records, CBS
- Formerly of: The Searchers, Tony Jackson and The Vibrations

Anthony Paul Jackson (16 July 1938 – 18 August 2003) was a British musician. He was known for being a member of the Merseybeat band The Searchers.

== Early life ==
Jackson was born in Dingle, Liverpool, Lancashire. After leaving school he went to Walton Technical College to train as an electrician. Jackson was inspired by the skiffle sound of Lonnie Donegan, and then by Buddy Holly and other U.S. rock and rollers. He founded the skiffle group the Martinis.

== The Searchers ==
Nicknamed Black Jake, he joined the guitar duo the Searchers, which had been formed by John McNally and Mike Pender in 1959. He was spotted by McNally and Pender in the Cross Keys in Liverpool, upon hearing that he "had a voice like Elvis". The band soon expanded further to a quartet with the addition of the drummer Chris Curtis. Jackson built and learned to play a customised bass guitar. Learning his new job on the four-stringed instrument proved too difficult to permit him to continue singing lead so he made way for a new singer, Johnny Sandon, in 1960.

They played in Liverpool's nightclubs and the beer bars of Hamburg, Germany. Brian Epstein considered signing them but he lost interest after seeing a drunken Jackson fall off the stage at the Cavern Club. Sandon moved on in February 1962 and the band were signed by Pye Records in mid-1963 when the Beatles' success created demand for Liverpudlian acts.

Jackson was lead singer and played bass on the band's first two the United Kingdom hits, "Sweets for My Sweet" and "Sugar and Spice", but was not the vocalist on the band's biggest hit "Needles and Pins". He was featured on both "Don't Throw Your Love Away" and "Love Potion No. 9".

In 1964 the band toured the United States, including an appearance on The Ed Sullivan Show.

== Tony Jackson and The Vibrations ==
=== Formation ===
The cover of The Tony Jackson Group's single "You're My Number One", with Jackson's face plastered on the left.

The Vibrations was formed in 1964, when Tony Jackson was unhappy with the Searchers move away from rock and roll to a softer, more melodic sound and felt that he was not getting appropriate attention. He left the group in July 1964 in some acrimony and immediately moved to London and put together a new band, the Vibrations, which had an organ-based sound instead of the Searchers' guitar based one.

=== First Success ===
The Vibrations toured the UK with the Hollies, Marianne Faithfull and other acts. They released four singles on the Pye Records label but only the first had any success. In 1965 they changed their name to the Tony Jackson Group but the fourth single also failed and Pye dropped them. The principal members of the Tony Jackson Group included: Jackson (lead vocals/bass), Ian Buisel (guitar), Denis Thompson (bass), Ian Green (organ), Paul Raymond (later of UFO, organ) and Paul Francis (drums).

The Vibrations released their own interpretation of the Searchers version of the Rhythm and Blues song Love Potion No. 9. The band then signed to CBS without improvement and they found that there were few bookings in the UK so they toured southern Europe until even that withered. Disillusioned and out of options, Jackson left the music business.

=== Reformation ===
In 1991, Tony Jackson and the Vibrations reformed and an album of Jackson's material after the Searchers was released. The resuscitation of his career was short-lived, however, although he did appear four times with Mike Pender's Searchers between 1992 and 1995, and it ended in 1996 when he was convicted of threatening a woman with an air pistol after an argument over a phone booth, and sentenced to 18 months imprisonment.

== Personal life ==
After leaving the Searchers Jackson spent £200 (equivalent to £3,500 in 2025) on cosmetic surgery on his nose. He said at the time that he had had a lifelong complex about his nose to the extent that he could not mix socially. The surgery had followed psychiatric treatment. That same year he revealed that his 1960 marriage to Margaret Parry had been effectively over for two years.

Jackson took a variety of jobs including Spanish night club manager, entertainments representative, furniture salesman, disc jockey and golf club manager. In the 1980s he tried to establish a Searchers revival band, but was unable to compete effectively with the other two that already existed. In 1996, Jackson was convicted of threatening a woman with an air pistol after an argument over a phone booth, and sentenced to 18 months imprisonment.

The arthritis in his hands became so bad that he had to abandon even recreational guitar playing. In 2002 he said, "The spirit's willing, but the body's knackered." Jackson was married three times.

He was described by Searchers member Mike Pender as "highly-talented with a great sense of humour, but could also be very difficult and confrontational", stating that he would "sometimes (be) offering to fight anyone in an audience who upset him".

== Death ==
Towards the end of his life he suffered from diabetes, heart disease and cirrhosis of the liver from a lifetime of heavy alcohol consumption. Jackson died on 18 August 2003 in a Nottingham hospital, he was 65. Frank Allen, who replaced Jackson as vocalist and bassist in the Searchers in 1964, said about his death:

It was so sad to hear of Tony Jackson`s death. It wasn`t entirely unexpected. When he visited our dressing room earlier in the year at Nottingham`s Royal Concert Hall it was immediately apparent that he was far from being a well man. In fact the deterioration from his appearance at our Appreciation Society Convention less than a year ago was quite shocking. He could not walk unaided by a stick and had difficulty speaking. One of the more pleasant aspects was that all the old troubles and resentments following his departure from the Searchers in 1964 had evaporated and we could at last reminisce like old friends. If he held a grudge at me for taking his job he did not show it.

== Discography ==
=== With The Searchers ===
==== Studio albums ====
Album details
Meet The Searchers
- Released: August 1963
- Label: Pye Records (NPL 18086)
- Format: LP
Sweets For My Sweet – The Searchers At The Star-Club Hamburg
- Released: October 1963
- Label: Philips Records (P48 052)
- Format: LP
Sugar and Spice
- Released: 16 October 1963
- Label: Pye Records (NPL 18089)
- Format: LP
It's the Searchers
- Released: 22 May 1964
- Label: Pye Records (NPL 18092)
- Format: LP

==== Singles ====
Title (A-side)	B-side	Year
"Sweets for My Sweet" (originally recorded by The Drifters)	"It's All Been a Dream"	1963
"Sweet Nothin's" (originally recorded by Brenda Lee)	"What'd I Say"	1963
"Sugar and Spice" (original version/first release)	"Saints and Searchers"	1963
"Needles and Pins" (originally recorded by Jackie DeShannon)	"Saturday Night Out" (UK and US 2nd pressings) "Ain't That Just Like Me" (US original pressings)	1964
"Süß ist sie" ("Sugar And Spice" in German)	"Liebe" ("Money" in German)	1964
"Tausend Nadelstiche" ("Needles and Pins" in German)	"Farmer John" (in German)	1964
"Ain't That Just Like Me" (originally recorded by The Coasters)	"Ain't Gonna Kiss Ya"	1964
"Don't Throw Your Love Away" (originally recorded by The Orlons)	"I Pretend I'm with You"	1964
"Someday We're Gonna Love Again" (originally recorded by Barbara Lewis)	"No One Else Could Love Me"	1964

==== EPs ====
Title	Year
Ain't Gonna Kiss Ya: Label: Pye Records (NEP 24177)	1963
Sweets For My Sweet: Label: Pye Records (NEP 24183)	1963
Hungry For Love: Label: Pye Records (NEP 24184)	1964
Les Searchers Chantent En Français: Label: Disques Vogue (PNV 24 121) Note: France only	1964
The Searchers Play The System: Label: Pye Records (NEP 24201)	1964

=== With Tony Jackson and The Vibrations ===
==== Singles ====
Title
"Fortune Teller"
"Bye Bye Baby"
"You Beat Me to the Punch"
"Love Potion No. 9"
"This Little Girl Of Mine"
"Stage Door"
"Watch Your Step"
"That's What I Want"
