= Mike Pender =

British musician (born 1941)

Mike Pender MBE
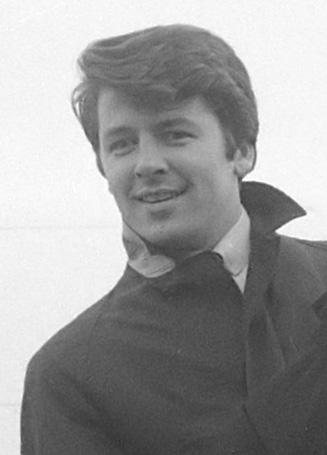
- Pender in 1965

Background information
- Born: Michael John Prendergast; 3 March 1941 (age 85); Kirkdale, Liverpool, England
- Genres: Rock, pop
- Occupation: Musician
- Instruments: Vocals, guitar
- Years active: 1950s–present
- Member of: Mike Pender's Searchers
- Formerly of: The Searchers, The Corporation
- Website: mikependersearchers.co.uk

Michael John Prendergast MBE (born 3 March 1941), known professionally by the stage name Mike Pender, is an English musician. He was an original founding member of Merseybeat group the Searchers. He is best known as the lead vocalist on many hit singles by the Searchers, including the song "Needles and Pins" and "What Have They Done to the Rain?".

== The Searchers ==
In his early years, Pender worked at a printing company (Charles Birchall & Sons (Liverpool) Ltd.) as a day job in between playing nightly gigs with the Searchers. According to Pender, he is responsible for choosing the band name for the Searchers. "The band was founded by myself and John McNally. In 1957 John and I went to see the film The Searchers starring John Wayne. I was an ardent Western fan and so I dragged John along with me to see it. I take the credit for choosing the name 'the Searchers' and for co-founding the band in its original form". Some years ago, Mike Pender claimed to be a member of two fictitious groups he played in before his years with the Searchers.

After the Searchers recorded the singles "Sweets for My Sweet" and "Sugar and Spice", Pender took over lead vocal duties from Tony Jackson. During the late 1970s, the Searchers were signed by Seymour Stein's Sire Records and recorded two modernised albums, including The Searchers and Play For Today, which was retitled Love's Melodies outside the United Kingdom. The Searchers recorded what would become the final single with Pender, "I Don't Want to Be the One".

== The Corporation ==
Pender left the Searchers in 1985 to pursue a solo career and in 1988 joined an all-star rock band known as the Corporation a.k.a. the "Travelling Wrinklies", whose name was a parody of the popular rock group Traveling Wilburys.

That band included Pender, Brian Poole (Brian Poole & The Tremeloes), Clem Curtis (The Tornados), Tony Crane (The Merseybeats) and Reg Presley (The Troggs). With the Searchers continuing to perform, Pender was replaced by a new vocalist, Spencer James.

== Mike Pender's Searchers ==
Pender pursued a solo career after leaving the Searchers and released one solo single before forming his current band, Mike Pender's Searchers who perform songs from his many years with the Searchers in addition to all-new material and a blend of popular rock standards by classic artists such as Buddy Holly, the Drifters and Roy Orbison. Selecting a group of talented musicians, Pender sought to re-create the unique sound that popularised the Searchers. Forming the band "Mike Pender's Searchers", they began touring in the late 1980s and re-recorded the Searchers' hits plus four new tracks.

Various CDs, featuring these new tracks and the re-recordings, have been released in various countries around the world. Mike Pender's Searchers continue to book new shows and tour, targeting Britain, Australia, the U.S., the Netherlands, Germany, Belgium, Sweden, Denmark and the United Arab Emirates. In 1994 Mike Pender's Searchers were the first 1960s band to be invited to play on board the QE2, as part of the world famous liner's 25th anniversary celebrations.

== Equipment ==
Over the years, some of Pender's personal guitars have included his Gibson ES-345 with sunburst finish, the Burns Tri-Sonic in the colour of red with three pick-ups and the twelve-string Rickenbacker Rose Morris model 1993 coloured in a fireglo finish with deluxe features including the f-hole rather than the slash sound hole. Other guitars he has played include the Aria twelve-string guitar, his Danelectro Bellzouki twelve-string made from wood and hardboard, and the solid Rickenbacker 450/12 in an elegant mapleglo finish, which had a converter comb, which allowed it to be converted into either a 6-string or 12-string guitar. Pender's Rose Morris model 1993 was stolen several years ago; it had been used on many of the Searchers' studio recordings in addition to numerous live performances.

== Personal life ==
On 2 June 2009, Pender's son, Nathan, aged 39, was riding home from work on his motorcycle, when he was hit and knocked off his vehicle. Nathan died two days later, from complications of a head injury sustained from the accident. 49-year-old police officer Eric Hulse was arrested for hitting and killing Prendergast.

Pender announced he would temporarily step down from touring for around six months, starting from December 2022:

I will have a break for about six months. My wife and I will be doing a bit of travelling around the world which will be nice to do.

== Honours ==
Pender was appointed Member of the Order of the British Empire (MBE) in the 2020 New Year Honours for services to music.

== Discography ==
=== With The Searchers ===
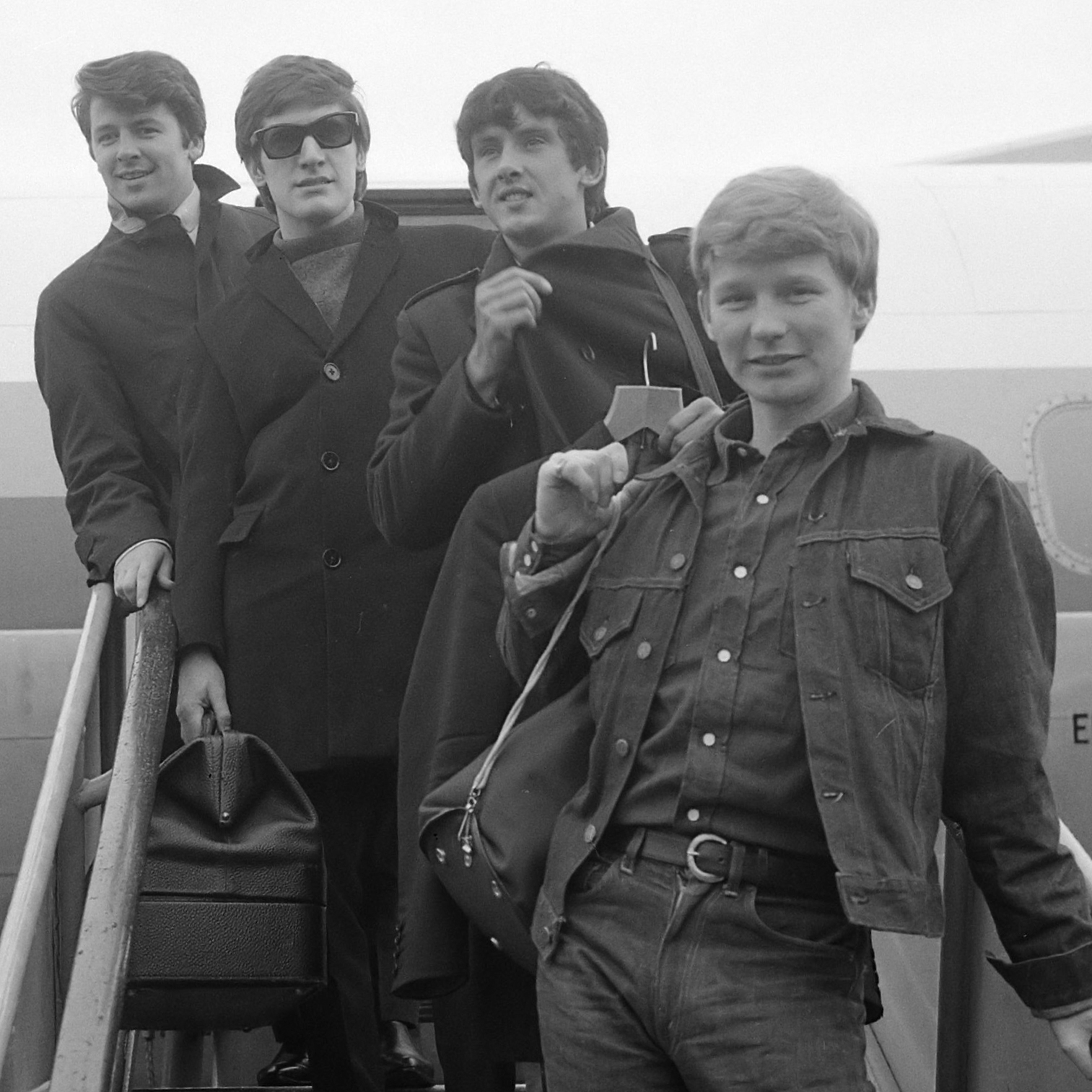
Pender (first from left) as part of the Searchers in 1965

==== Studio albums ====
Album details	Year
Meet The Searchers: Released: August 1963; Label: Pye Records (NPL 18086); Format: LP	1963
Sweets For My Sweet – The Searchers At The Star-Club Hamburg: Released: October 1963; Label: Philips Records (P48 052); Format: LP	1963
Sugar and Spice: Released: 16 October 1963; Label: Pye Records (NPL 18089); Format: LP	1963
It's the Searchers: Released: May 1964; Label: Pye Records (NPL 18092); Format: LP	1964
Sounds Like Searchers: Released: 19 March 1965; Label: Pye Records (NPL 18111); Format: LP	1965
Take Me for What I'm Worth: Released: November 1965; Label: Pye Records (NPL 18120 / NSPL 18120); Format: LP	1965
Second Take: Released: November 1972; Label: RCA Victor (SF 8298); Format: LP	1972
Searchers: Released: October 1979; Label: Sire Records (SRK 6082); Format: LP	1979
Play For Today: Released: April 1981; Label: Sire Records (SRK 3523); Format: LP	1981

==== Singles ====
Title (A-side)	B-side	Year
"Sweets for My Sweet" (originally recorded by The Drifters)	"It's All Been a Dream"	1963
"Sweet Nothin's" (originally recorded by Brenda Lee)	"What'd I Say"	1963
"Sugar and Spice" (original version/first release)	"Saints and Searchers"	1963
"Needles and Pins" (originally recorded by Jackie DeShannon)	"Saturday Night Out" (UK and US 2nd pressings) "Ain't That Just Like Me" (US original pressings)	1964
"Süß ist sie" ("Sugar And Spice" in German)	"Liebe" ("Money" in German)	1964
"Tausend Nadelstiche" ("Needles and Pins" in German)	"Farmer John" (in German)	1964
"Ain't That Just Like Me" (originally recorded by The Coasters)	"Ain't Gonna Kiss Ya"	1964
"Don't Throw Your Love Away" (originally recorded by The Orlons)	"I Pretend I'm with You"	1964
"Someday We're Gonna Love Again" (originally recorded by Barbara Lewis)	"No One Else Could Love Me"	1964
"When You Walk in the Room" (originally recorded by Jackie DeShannon)	"I'll Be Missing You"	1964
"Love Potion No. 9" (originally recorded by The Clovers)	"Hi-Heel Sneakers"	1964
"What Have They Done to the Rain" (originally recorded by Malvina Reynolds)	"This Feeling Inside"	1964
"Magic Potion" (originally recorded by Lou Johnson) Note: Australia only	"Everything You Do"	1965
"Bumble Bee" (originally recorded by LaVern Baker)	"Everything You Do" (US first pressings) "A Tear Fell" (US later pressings)	1965
"I Don't Want to Go On Without You" (originally recorded by The Drifters)	"A Tear Fell"	1965
"Goodbye My Love" (originally recorded by Jimmy Hughes) (US single shown as "Goodbye My Lover Goodbye")	"Till I Met You"	1965
"Verzeih' My Love" ("Goodbye My Love" in German)	"Wenn ich dich seh'" ("When You Walk In The Room" in German)	1965
"He's Got No Love"	"So Far Away"	1965
"When I Get Home" (originally recorded by Bobby Darin)	"I'm Never Coming Back"	1965
"Don't You Know Why"	"You Can't Lie to a Liar"	1965
"Take Me for What I'm Worth" (originally recorded by P. F. Sloan)	"Too Many Miles"	1965
"Take It or Leave It" (originally recorded by The Rolling Stones)	"Don't Hide It Away"	1966
"Have You Ever Loved Somebody?" (originally recorded by The Hollies)	"It's Just the Way (Love Will Come and Go)"	1966
"Popcorn Double Feature"	"Lovers"	1967
"Western Union" (originally recorded by The Five Americans)	"I'll Cry Tomorrow"	1967
"Second Hand Dealer"	"Crazy Dreams"	1967
"Umbrella Man"	"Over the Weekend"	1968
"Somebody Shot the Lollipop Man" (Released under the pseudonym "Pasha")	"Pussy Willow Dragon"	1969
"Shoot 'Em Up Baby" (originally recorded by Andy Kim)	"Suzanna"	1969
"Kinky Kathy Abernathy"	"Suzanna"	1969
"Desdemona"	"The World Is Waiting for Tomorrow"	1971
"Love Is Everywhere"	"And a Button"	1971
"Sing Singer Sing"	"Come On Back to Me"	1972
"Needles and Pins" (re-recording)	"When You Walk in the Room"/ "Come On Back to Me"	1972
"Solitaire" (originally recorded by Neil Sedaka)	"Spicks and Specks"	1973
"Vahevala" (originally recorded by Loggins & Messina)	"Madman"	1973
"Hearts in Her Eyes" (given to the group by The Records)	"Don't Hang On"	1979
"It's Too Late"	"This Kind of Love Affair" (UK) "Don't Hang On" (US)	1979
"Love's Melody" (originally recorded by Ducks Deluxe)	"Changing" (UK) "Little Bit of Heaven" (US)	1981
"Another Night"	"Back to the War"	1981
"I Don't Want to Be the One"	"Hollywood"	1982

==== EPs ====
Title	Year
Ain't Gonna Kiss Ya: Label: Pye Records (NEP 24177)	1963
Sweets For My Sweet: Label: Pye Records (NEP 24183)	1963
Hungry For Love: Label: Pye Records (NEP 24184)	1964
Les Searchers Chantent En Français: Label: Disques Vogue (PNV 24 121) Note: France only	1964
The Searchers Play The System: Label: Pye Records (NEP 24201)	1964
When You Walk In The Room: Label: Pye Records (NEP 24204)	1965
Bumble Bee: Label: Pye Records (NEP 24218)	1965
Searchers '65: Label: Pye Records (NEP 24222)	1965
Four By Four: Label: Pye Records (NEP 24228)	1965
Take Me For What I'm Worth: Label: Pye Records (NEP 24263)	1966

=== With Mike Pender's Searchers ===
==== Albums ====
- That Was Then This Is Now
- Mike Pender's Searchers
- Sweets for My Sweet
- Best of Mike Pender's Searchers
- Needles & Pins
- Mike Pender's Searchers Live!

=== Literature ===
- Mike Pender: The Search for Myself (Malpas: Genuine Article, 2014) ISBN 0993121306
