= Sweets for My Sweet – The Searchers at the Star-Club Hamburg =

1964 live album by The Searchers

Live album by The Searchers
- Released: 1964
- Recorded: 1 March 1963
- Genre: Rock/Pop
- Label: Philips

The Searchers chronology
| Meet The Searchers (1963) | Sweets for My Sweet – The Searchers at the Star-Club Hamburg (1964) | Sugar and Spice (1963) |

Alternate cover art
- Australian cover art

Sweets for My Sweet – The Searchers at the Star-Club Hamburg is the first live album by English rock band the Searchers, recorded in spring 1963 at the German Star-Club during their Hamburg residency. It was recorded before the group's success in the United Kingdom. Soon after, they signed with Pye Records and went on to score many hits. Later, the Searchers re-recorded some of these tracks in studio and issued on their albums or singles (including hit versions of "Sweets for My Sweet" and "Ain't That Just Like Me"). Nevertheless, the LP has never been officially released in the UK, although a live recording of the song "Sweet Nothin's" made the UK Top 50.

== Overview ==
"We didn't really know that was going on until we came on the Star-Club scene", the band's guitarist John McNally once said. Some of the well known bands played at the Star-Club and recorded live songs at the same time for the special various artists live LP. Only mono recordings were possible, most of them made in the afternoon session, when the club was closed (the applause was copied later). The initial album from these recordings was released in Germany as Twist im Star-Club Hamburg and in the UK as Twist at the Star-Club Hamburg (Philips BL7578, 1963). The following musicians performed on this album: The Searchers, Sounds Incorporated, The Rattles, The Star Combo and Peter Nelson & The Travelers. Three songs by The Searchers appeared ("Sweet Nothin's", "Beautiful Dreamer" and "Shakin' All Over"), but they made 19 recordings at all. In the meantime, "Sweets for My Sweet" established the band in the UK, so Philips decided to release 13 more Searchers' tracks from these live sessions. The result was an album named Sweets for My Sweet – The Searchers at the Star-Club Hamburg. The album peaked at number 11 on the German album chart on 5 March 1964. The Searchers didn't get paid for the recordings. The record company and the Star-Club's owner, Manfred Weissleder, got the money.

== Re-release ==
Star-Club Records label re-released the complete Searchers' catalogue from Hamburg for the first time in 1979. Double album with the same title and cover art as the original was presented in a gatefold sleeve. The album was expanded with the inclusion of six additional tracks: "Beautiful Dreamer", "Sweet Nothin's", "Shakin' All Over" (all from "Twist at the Star-Club Hamburg" LP), "Sweet Little Sixteen", "Don't You Know" (The Crickets song) and "Maybellene". Plus 5 tracks performed by Sounds Inc., The Rattles and the Star Combo. Bear Family Records released complete show on CD in 2002 under the title The Searchers At The Star-Club.

== Track listing ==
Side 1
| No. | Title | Writer(s) | Lead vocals | Length |
|---|---|---|---|---|
| 1. | "Sweets for My Sweet" | Doc Pomus, Mort Shuman | Tony Jackson | 2:15 |
| 2. | "Ain't That Just Like Me" | Earl Carroll, Billy Guy | Chris Curtis | 1:53 |
| 3. | "Listen to Me" | Charles Hardin, Norman Petty | Tony Jackson, Mike Pender | 2:25 |
| 4. | "I Can Tell" | Bo Diddley, Samuel Smith | Chris Curtis | 1:45 |
| 5. | "Sick and Tired" | Chris Kenner, Dave Bartholomew | Chris Curtis | 2:38 |
| 6. | "Mashed Potatoes" | Dessie Rozier | Tony Jackson | 2:33 |

Side 2
| No. | Title | Writer(s) | Lead vocals | Length |
|---|---|---|---|---|
| 1. | "I Sure Know a Lot About Love" | Gary S. Paxton, Buddy Mize | Tony Jackson, Mike Pender | 2:07 |
| 2. | "Rosalie" | Fats Domino, Dave Bartholomew | John McNally | 2:18 |
| 3. | "Led in the Game" | Buddy Holly | Tony Jackson | 2:03 |
| 4. | "Hey Joe" | Boudleaux Bryant | Mike Pender | 2:32 |
| 5. | "Always It's You" | Felice and Boudleaux Bryant | Mike Pender, Chris Curtis | 2:05 |
| 6. | "Hully Gully" | Fred Sledge Smith, Clifford Goldsmith | Tony Jackson | 2:23 |
| 7. | "What I'd Say" | Robert Byrne, Will Robinson | Chris Curtis | 2:21 |

== US version (Hear! Hear!) ==
Hear! Hear!

Live album by The Searchers
- Released: May 1964
- Recorded: 1 March 1963
- Genre: Rock/Pop
- Language: English
- Label: Mercury

The Searchers chronology
| Meet The Searchers / Needles and Pins (1964) | Hear! Hear! (1964) | This Is Us (1964) |

The US version of the Star-Club album was retitled Hear! Hear! Mercury Records released it in the summer of 1964 in mono (MG 20914) and stereo (SR 60914), although the original recordings were only made in mono. The song "Always It's You", originally recorded by the Everly Brothers, was omitted from the track list. The album entered the LP charts on July 20 went to No. 120 and stayed for 8 weeks. One more single from the LP was released in the US on Mercury label, "Ain't That Just Like Me". It failed the charts, although studio version of the song went to No. 61. More Searchers' recordings from the Star-Club were released on the band's next live album named The Searchers Meet the Rattles.

== Personnel ==
The Searchers

- Mike Pender – lead guitar, lead vocals, backing vocals
- John McNally – rhythm guitar, lead and backing vocals
- Tony Jackson – bass guitar, lead and backing vocals
- Chris Curtis – drums, lead and backing vocals
