= It's the Searchers =

1964 studio album by The Searchers

Studio album by The Searchers
- Released: 22 May 1964
- Recorded: November 1963–April 1964
- Studios: Pye Studios, London
- Genre: Rock/Pop
- Label: Pye
- Producer: Tony Hatch

The Searchers chronology
| Sugar and Spice (1963) | It's the Searchers (1964) | Sounds Like Searchers (1964) |

Singles from It's the Searchers
- 1. "Needles and Pins" Released: 7 January 1964; 2. "Don't Throw Your Love Away" Released: April 1964

Alternate UK cover art (1968)
- Album re-issue on Marble Arch Records

It's the Searchers is the third studio album by English rock band The Searchers. It features the band's famous hit singles "Needles and Pins" and "Don't Throw Your Love Away" as well as cover versions of some well known tracks originally recorded by Betty Everett ("It's In Her Kiss"), Carl Perkins ("Glad All Over"), Don Gibson ("Sea of Heartbreak"), The Drifters ("I Count the Tears") or Tommy Tucker ("Hi-Heel Sneakers"). It was also the last Searchers album to feature singer Tony Jackson. The album peaked at No. 4 in the UK album chart.

== Overview and recording ==
The tension in the Searchers began before the recording sessions. Things got worse between Chris Curtis and Tony Jackson. Curtis became the leader of the band and in fact, he did not like Jackson's style or himself at all. “I didn’t like Tony Jackson much, even from the start, and if I’d had the nous to audition for the Searchers, I would have had someone else in the first place,” said Curtis to Spencer Leigh in 1997. So, Tony lost the position of the band’s lead singer. Chris Curtis would tell him his vocals were not needed and he was to play bass his (i.e. Chris's) way. Their egos grew bigger and as the new lead singer Mike Pender wrote in his autobiography: “Internal tensions within the band worsened when certain people neglected to tell Tony about recording sessions and policy discussions.” Finally, Jackson sang lead vocal on one song only, "Sho' Know A Lot About Love " (and even there he shared his vocal with Mike Pender).

Although it was probably not the intention of the authors, a later re-issue of the album (1968) featured an updated band photo on the cover with new bass player Frank Allen (even though he didn’t perform on any song on the album).

During the album sessions, the band also recorded two unreleased tracks. The first was "I (Who Have Nothing)", an English language cover of the Italian song performed by Ben E. King in the US. The second was "Shame Shame Shame" written by American blues musician Jimmy Reed. Both songs were finally released in 1992 on The Searchers' 3CD box 30th Anniversary Collection 1962–1992. Journalist Alan Walsh (Disc) claimed that he "goes to a Pye LP session and joins the boys" and sang backing vocals with them on the song "Sho' Know A Lot About Love".

== Release ==
It's the Searchers was the third Searchers' album released within 12 months (fourth, if we count the live German LP Sweets for My Sweet). It came as a monaural (mono) LP album on the Pye label in the UK in April 1964, Pye NPL 18092. It entered the LP charts on May 30 went to No. 4 and stayed for 17 weeks. Early pressings of the album (and some international releases) had been made with title "It's Fab! It's Gear! It's the Searchers", the originally intended album title, but it was shortened later.

The low-budget Marble Arch Records reissued the album in 1968 with the new cover art. This LP was released in mono (MAL 798) and for the first time also in stereo version (MALS 798). But the track list was shortened and four songs were omitted ("It's In Her Kiss", "Glad All Over", "This Empty Place" and "Gonna Send You Back To Georgia").

== Track listing ==
Side 1
| No. | Title | Writer(s) | Lead vocals | Length |
|---|---|---|---|---|
| 1. | "It's In Her Kiss" | Rudy Clark | Mike Pender | 2:15 |
| 2. | "Glad All Over" | Aaron Schroeder, Sid Tepper, Roy C. Bennett | Chris Curtis | 1:53 |
| 3. | "Sea of Heartbreak" | Paul Hampton, Hal David | Mike Pender | 2:25 |
| 4. | "Livin' Lovin' Wreck" | Otis Blackwell | Mike Pender | 1:45 |
| 5. | "Where Have You Been" | Barry Mann, Cynthia Weil | Chris Curtis | 2:38 |
| 6. | "Shimmy Shimmy" | Albert Shubert, Bill Massey | Mike Pender | 2:33 |
| 7. | "Needles and Pins" | Sonny Bono, Jack Nitzsche | Mike Pender | 2:14 |

Side 2
| No. | Title | Writer(s) | Lead vocals | Length |
|---|---|---|---|---|
| 1. | "This Empty Place" | Burt Bacharach, Hal David | Chris Curtis | 2:07 |
| 2. | "Gonna Send You Back To Georgia" | Johnnie Mae Matthews, Timmy Shaw | Chris Curtis | 2:18 |
| 3. | "I Count the Tears" | Doc Pomus, Mort Shuman | Mike Pender | 2:03 |
| 4. | "Hi-Heel Sneakers" | Robert Higginbotham | John McNally | 2:32 |
| 5. | "Can't Help Forgiving You" | Jackie DeShannon, Sharon Sheeley | Mike Pender | 2:05 |
| 6. | "Sho' Know A Lot About Love" | Gary S. Paxton, Buddy Mize | Tony Jackson, Mike Pender | 2:23 |
| 7. | "Don't Throw Your Love Away" | Billy Jackson, Jimmy Wisner | Mike Pender | 2:21 |

== US version (This Is Us) ==
This Is Us

Studio album by The Searchers
- Released: August 1964
- Studios: Pye Studios, London
- Genre: Rock/Pop
- Label: Kapp
- Producer: Tony Hatch

The Searchers US chronology
| Hear! Hear! (1964) | This Is Us (1964) | The Searchers Meet the Rattles (1964) |

Singles from This Is Us
- 1. "Don't Throw Your Love Away" Released: May 1964; 2. "Love Potion No. 9" Released: November 1964

The US version of It's The Searchers was retitled This Is Us (i. e. the headline on the back side of the UK LP cover) and given a different cover art (the photo of the Searchers was taken by photographer Alex Greco). It was released with a different track listing (included some older UK album tracks and B–sides, while deleting six songs: "Glad All Over", "Livin' Lovin' Wreck", "Shimmy Shimmy", "Needles And Pins", "Gonna Send You Back To Georgia" and "Sho' Know A Lot About Love"). It entered the LP charts on 29 August 1964 and peaked at No. 97 on Billboard Top 200.

== Love Potion No. 9 ==
The song "Love Potion No. 9" (written by Jerry Leiber and Mike Stoller) was chosen as an additional single from the album (with "Hi-Heel Sneakers" on the B-side). It became massively popular and reached No. 3 on the U.S. Billboard Hot 100 and No. 2 on Cash Box during the winter of 1965. Lead singer Tony Jackson left the band at the time of the album's release and formed his own band, Tony Jackson And The Vibrations. He immediately recorded his own new version of the hit song, but it missed the charts.

== US Track listing ==
Side one
| No. | Title | Writer(s) | Original UK release | Length |
|---|---|---|---|---|
| 1. | "Don't Throw Your Love Away" | Billy Jackson, Jimmy Wisner | It's the Searchers | 2:21 |
| 2. | "Unhappy Girls" | Fred Burch, Marijohn Wilkin | Sugar And Spice | 2:38 |
| 3. | "Where Have You Been" | Barry Mann, Cynthia Weil | It's the Searchers | 2:38 |
| 4. | "Hungry for Love" | Gordon Mills | Sugar And Spice | 2:24 |
| 5. | "This Empty Place" | Burt Bacharach, Hal David | It's the Searchers | 2:07 |
| 6. | "Hi-Heel Sneakers" | Robert Higginbotham | It's the Searchers | 2:32 |

Side two
| No. | Title | Writer(s) | Original UK release | Length |
|---|---|---|---|---|
| 1. | "It's In Her Kiss" | Rudy Clark | It's the Searchers | 2:15 |
| 2. | "I Count the Tears" | Doc Pomus, Mort Shuman | It's the Searchers | 2:03 |
| 3. | "Can't Help Forgiving You" | Jackie DeShannon, Sharon Sheeley | It's the Searchers | 2:05 |
| 4. | "Love Potion No. 9" | Jerry Leiber and Mike Stoller | Meet the Searchers | 2:05 |
| 5. | "Sea of Heartbreak" | Paul Hampton, Hal David | It's the Searchers | 2:25 |
| 6. | "I Pretend I'm With You" | Chris Curtis | non-album single, B-side Don't Throw Your Love Away | 2:00 |

== Personnel ==
The Searchers

- Mike Pender – lead guitar, lead vocals, backing vocals
- John McNally – rhythm guitar, lead and backing vocals
- Tony Jackson – bass guitar, lead and backing vocals
- Chris Curtis – drums, lead and backing vocals

Additional musicians and production

- Tony Hatch – producer, piano
- Ray Prickett – Recording engineer
- Alan Walsh – backing vocals on "Sho' Know A Lot About Love"
