= Sugar and Spice (The Searchers album) =

Studio album by The Searchers
- Released: 1963
- Recorded: 1963
- Studios: Pye (London, UK)
- Genre: Beat
- Length: 29:45 (1963 LP); 45:30 (2001 CD Reissue)
- Label: Pye
- Producer: Tony Hatch

The Searchers chronology
Sweets For My Sweet – The Searchers At The Star-Club Hamburg (1963)	Sugar and Spice (1963)	It's the Searchers (1964)

Singles from Sugar And Spice
- 1. "Sugar and Spice" Released: October 1963; 2. "Ain't That Just Like Me" Released: March 1964 (US)

Alternate UK cover art (1967)
- Sugar And Spice (Marble Arch Records)

Professional ratings
Review scores
Source	Rating
Record Mirror	5/5 stars

Sugar and Spice is the second studio album by the British rock band The Searchers released in 1963. This album features the band's second big hit single "Sugar and Spice". With two successful Top 5 albums in three months, and two other Top 3 hit singles at the time, the group proved to be the strongest to emerge from Liverpool next to the Beatles and Gerry and the Pacemakers. They solidified their position further with another album track, "Ain't That Just Like Me", which was later released in the US and hit #61 on the Billboard Hot 100.

== Overview and recording ==
The first album single, "Sugar and Spice", was written by producer Tony Hatch (using the pseudonym Fred Nightingale in order to better convince the band to record it), and he felt the song had enormous hit potential, given its similarity to the group's previous No.1 hit "Sweets for My Sweet". Both songs are similar in style, backing vocals, chord progressions, and guitar solos. Hatch plotted for it to be the next Searchers A-side. Although they disliked it and initially opposed using it, they recorded the song. Chris Curtis was annoyed by the similarities to "Sweets for my Sweet" and refused to sing on it, although he did overdub the high-pitched harmony links between verses. Nevertheless, the song reached No. 2 on the UK's Record Retailer chart, just one step behind the Beatles' "I Want to Hold Your Hand".

With the massive popularity of the Searchers, Pye Records decided to release a follow-up album as soon as possible for the Christmas market. The group were pulled back to the studio in the middle of their UK tour with Brian Poole and the Tremeloes and Roy Orbison, and made the new album in just three days. As with their debut album, it contained more numbers from their original stage repertoire. They covered tunes by their American idols, such as Buddy Holly ("Listen to Me", "Don't Cha Know"), girl group The Chiffons ("Oh My Lover"), and The Coasters ("Ain't That Just Like Me"), and also the Merseybeat standard "Some Other Guy", which became a staple ingredient in almost every Liverpool group's set-list.

The Beatles did "Some Other Guy". We did "Some Other Guy". The Big Three did "Some Other Guy". Everybody did "Some Other Guy". But, if you listen to all the versions of "Some Other Guy", or "Money", you’ll find that no two versions are the same.

— John McNally

== Release ==
Sugar and Spice was released as a mono LP album on the Pye label in the UK in Autumn 1963, Pye NPL 18089. It entered the LP charts on 16 November 1963 and went to No. 5 (the band's first LP Meet the Searchers still occupied No. 3 that same week) and stayed for 21 weeks. Four of the album's tracks were later issued on the EP Hungry for Love, which went to No. 4 in the UK charts. Sugar And Spice LP was not available in the US. Instead, five of the album's twelve tracks appeared on Kapp Records' release, Meet The Searchers / Needles and Pins, issued in North America only (and with two more on another US-only LP, This Is Us).

== Track listing ==
Side 1
No.	Title	Writer(s)	Lead vocals	Length
1.	"Sugar and Spice"	Fred Nightingale	Tony Jackson	2:16
2.	"Don't Cha Know"	David Box, Ernie Hall	Mike Pender	2:03
3.	"Some Other Guy"	Jerry Leiber, Mike Stoller, Richard Barrett	Tony Jackson, Mike Pender	2:08
4.	"One of These Days"	Ronnie Hawkins, Jacqueline Magill	Mike Pender	2:17
5.	"Listen to Me"	Charles Hardin, Norman Petty	Tony Jackson, Mike Pender	2:12
6.	"Unhappy Girls"	Fred Burch, Marijohn Wilkin	Mike Pender	2:38

Side 2
No.	Title	Writer(s)	Lead vocals	Length
7.	"Ain't That Just Like Me"	Earl Carroll, Billy Guy	Chris Curtis	2:25
8.	"Oh My Lover"	Ronnie Mack	Tony Jackson	2:25
9.	"Saints and Searchers"	Traditional; arranged by The Searchers	Tony Jackson	3:17
10.	"Cherry Stones"	John Jerome	Tony Jackson, Mike Pender	2:28
11.	"All My Sorrows"	Glenn Yarborough	Mike Pender, Chris Curtis	3:26
12.	"Hungry for Love"	Gordon Mills	Tony Jackson, Mike Pender	2:24

2001 Reissue Bonus Tracks
No.	Title	Writer(s)	Lead vocals	Length
13.	"C'est De Notre Age" ("Sugar and Spice" in French)	Fred Nightingale (Translator: Michel Paje)	Tony Jackson	2:15
14.	"Süß ist sie" ("Sugar and Spice" in German)	Fred Nightingale (Translator unknown)	Tony Jackson	2:15
15.	"Ils la Chantaient Il y a Longtemps" ("Saints and Searchers" in French)	Traditional; arranged by The Searchers (Translator: Alain Gaunay)	Chris Curtis	3:17
16.	"Saturday Night Out"	Mark Anthony, Robert Richards	Tony Jackson, Mike Pender	1:45
17.	"Bye Bye Johnny"	Chuck Berry	John McNally	2:46
18.	"I Don't Want to Go on Without You"	Bert Berns, Jerry Wexler	Mike Pender	3:27

== Personnel ==
The Searchers

- Tony Jackson - bass, lead vocals, backing vocals
- Mike Pender - lead guitar, backing vocals, lead vocals
- John McNally - rhythm guitar, backing vocals
- Chris Curtis - drums, backing vocals, lead vocals

Additional musicians and production

- Tony Hatch – producer, piano
- Ray Prickett – recording engineer

== Charts ==
Weekly chart performance for Sugar and Spice
Chart (1963–1964)	Peak position
UK Melody Maker Top Ten LPs	7
UK New Musical Express Top Ten LPs	3
UK Record Retailer LPs Chart	5
West German Musikmarkt Albums Chart	30
