= Meet The Searchers =

1963 debut studio album by The Searchers

Studio album by The Searchers
- Released: August 1963
- Recorded: 1963
- Studios: Pye Studios, London
- Genres: Rock and roll; beat
- Length: 30:06 (1963 LP); 38:32 (2001 CD Reissue)
- Label: Pye
- Producer: Tony Hatch

The Searchers chronology
Meet The Searchers (1963)	Sweets For My Sweet – The Searchers At The Star-Club Hamburg (1963)

Singles from Meet the Searchers
- 1. "Sweets for My Sweet" Released: June 1963; 2. "Love Potion No. 9" Released: November 1964 (USA)

Professional ratings
Review scores
Source	Rating
New Record Mirror	5/5 stars

Meet The Searchers is the 1963 debut and most successful album by British rock band The Searchers. The album featured their first single released in June 1963, a version of the Drifters' "Sweets for My Sweet", which was a UK No.1 for the band, as well as their version of the Clovers "Love Potion No.9", which was released as a single in the U.S. (but not in the UK) the following year. "Love Potion No.9" peaked on the US charts at No. 3 on 19 December 1964. The album was also released in Canada, Germany and South Africa, often with track listing changes.

== Overview ==
Nationwide interest in The Searchers had been piqued with the success of their UK No. 1 single, and Pye Records, hoping to take advantage of this, promptly decided to follow it up with an album. It was a straightforward performance of their stage repertoire, so they covered a lot of songs by American artists like Ben E. King ("Stand By Me"), Barrett Strong ("Money (That's What I Want)"), The Crystals ("Da Doo Ron Ron"), The Everly Brothers ("Since You Broke My Heart"), and The Isley Brothers ("Twist and Shout"). Meet The Searchers mainly consisted of rock and roll or rhythm and blues material with an exception of a modern folk-style song "Where Have All the Flowers Gone?", made famous by The Kingston Trio and Peter, Paul and Mary. The band cut all 11 tracks in a one-day session (aside from the already recorded "Sweets for My Sweet"), just as The Beatles did with Please Please Me.

== Release ==
Meet The Searchers was released as a monaural (mono) LP album on the Pye label in the UK in the summer of 1963 [Pye NPL 18086]. It entered the LP charts on 10 August 1963, reached the No. 2 spot (The Beatles held the #1 position with Please Please Me) and charted for 44 weeks. Alternatively, two EPs containing songs from the album were released in the UK. Ain't Gonna Kiss Ya, with the lead track originally recorded by The Ribbons, was released in September and reached the top spot on 5 October 1963. The second, Sweets for My Sweet (including Chris Curtis' self-penned B-side song "It's All Been a Dream"), aimed at the lucrative Christmas market in December and went to No. 5.

== Track listing ==
Side one
No.	Title	Writer(s)	Lead vocals	Length
1.	"Sweets for My Sweet"	Doc Pomus, Mort Shuman	Tony Jackson	2:28
2.	"Alright"	Jerry Ross, Lester Vanadore	Tony Jackson	2:09
3.	"Love Potion No. 9"	Jerry Leiber, Mike Stoller	Tony Jackson, Mike Pender	2:05
4.	"Farmer John"	Don Harris, Dewey Terry	Tony Jackson, Mike Pender, John McNally	1:59
5.	"Stand by Me"	Ben E. King, Jerry Leiber, Mike Stoller	Chris Curtis	3:28
6.	"Money"	Janie Bradford, Berry Gordy	Tony Jackson	2:47

Side 2
No.	Title	Writer(s)	Lead vocals	Length
1.	"Da Doo Ron Ron"	Phil Spector, Jeff Barry, Ellie Greenwich	Tony Jackson, Mike Pender	2:25
2.	"Ain't Gonna Kiss Ya"	James Marcus Smith	Tony Jackson, Mike Pender, Chris Curtis	2:05
3.	"Since You Broke My Heart"	Don Everly, Phil Everly	Tony Jackson, Mike Pender	2:50
4.	"Tricky Dicky"	Jerry Leiber, Mike Stoller	Tony Jackson, Mike Pender	2:08
5.	"Where Have All the Flowers Gone"	Pete Seeger	Mike Pender, Chris Curtis	2:57
6.	"Twist and Shout"	Phil Medley, Bert Russell	Tony Jackson	2:45

2001 Reissue Bonus Tracks
No.	Title	Writer(s)	Lead vocals	Length
13.	"It's All Been a Dream"	Chris Curtis	Tony Jackson	1:49
14.	"Geld (Das ist, was ich wünsche)" ("Money (That's What I Want)" in German)	Janie Bradford, Berry Gordy (Translator unknown)	Tony Jackson	2:46
15.	"Landwirt John" ("Farmer John" in German)	Don Harris, Dewey Terry (Translator unknown)	Tony Jackson, Mike Pender, John McNally	2:00
16.	"Mais C’etait Un Rêve" ("It's All Been a Dream" in French)	Chris Curtis (Translator: Alain Gaunay)	Mike Pender, Chris Curtis	1:51

== US version (Meet The Searchers / Needles And Pins) ==
Meet The Searchers / Needles And Pins)

Studio album by The Searchers
- Released: March 1964
- Recorded: 1963
- Studios: Pye Studios, London
- Genre: Rock/Pop
- Label: Kapp
- Producer: Tony Hatch

The Searchers US chronology
Meet The Searchers / Needles And Pins) (1964)	Hear! Hear! (1964)

Singles from Meet The Searchers / Needles And Pins
- 1. "Needles and Pins" Released: February 1964; 2. "Ain't That Just Like Me" Released: March 1964

In 1964 the British Invasion started and the Searchers were at the forefront with The Beatles and The Dave Clark Five. The group appeared on The Ed Sullivan Show with "Needles and Pins" and "Ain't That Just Like Me", both of which became hits in the US. Kapp Records got the rights and started to release the Searchers' music. In the American market, albums were typically limited to 12 tracks and it was expected for albums to include the current hit single. Kapp Records released a compilation of the British market albums Meet The Searchers and Sugar and Spice (5 songs from each) with additional songs from the single "Needles and Pins" / "Saturday Night Out". The album, released both in mono [Kapp KL 1363] and stereo [Kapp KS 3363], entered the Billboard Top 200 on 11 April 1964, went to No. 22 and stayed for 21 weeks.

=== Track listing ===
Side one
No.	Title	Writer(s)	Original UK release	Length
1.	"Needles and Pins"	Sonny Bono, Jack Nitzsche	It's The Searchers	2:20
2.	"Since You Broke My Heart"	Don Everly, Phil Everly	Meet The Searchers	2:58
3.	"Oh My Lover"	Ronnie Mack	Sugar And Spice	2:36
4.	"Alright"	Jerry Ross, Lester Vanadore	Meet The Searchers	2:04
5.	"Ain't Gonna Kiss Ya"	James Marcus Smith	Meet The Searchers	1:59
6.	"Tricky Dicky"	Jerry Leiber, Mike Stoller	Meet The Searchers	2:52

Side two
No.	Title	Writer(s)	Original UK release	Length
1.	"Ain't That Just Like Me"	Earl Carroll (vocalist), Billy Guy	Sugar And Spice	2:46
2.	"Some Other Guy"	Jerry Leiber, Mike Stoller, Richie Barrett	Sugar And Spice	2:57
3.	"Farmer John"	Don Harris, Dewey Terry	Meet The Searchers	1:57
4.	"Saturday Night Out"	Mark Anthony, Robert Richards	non-album single, B-side Needles And Pins	3:16
5.	"Cherry Stones"	John Jerome	Sugar And Spice	3:06
6.	"Don't Cha Know"	David Box, Ernie Hall	Sugar And Spice	2:38

== Personnel ==
The Searchers

- Mike Pender - lead guitar, backing vocals, lead vocals
- John McNally - rhythm guitar, backing vocals
- Tony Jackson - bass, lead vocals, backing vocals
- Chris Curtis - drums, backing vocals, lead vocals

Additional musicians and production

- Tony Hatch – producer, piano
- Ray Prickett – recording engineer

== Charts ==
Weekly chart performance for Meet The Searchers / Needles and Pins
Chart (1963–1964)	Peak position
UK Melody Maker Top Ten LPs	2
UK New Musical Express Top Ten LPs	2
UK Record Retailer LPs Chart	2
US Billboard Top LP's	22
US Cash Box Top 100 Albums	19
US Record World 100 Top LP's	10
West German Musikmarkt Albums Chart	20
