= Love Potion No. 9 (song) =

1959 song written by Jerry Leiber and Mike Stoller

Single by The Clovers
- B-side: "Stay Awhile"
- Released: July 1959
- Recorded: June 8, 1959
- Studio: Capitol (New York City)
- Genre: Doo-wop
- Length: 2:02
- Label: United Artists
- Songwriter: Jerry Leiber and Mike Stoller

Official Audio
- "Love Potion No. 9" on YouTube

"Love Potion Number Nine"

Single by The Searchers

from the album Meet the Searchers
- B-side: "Hi-Heel Sneakers"
- Released: November 1964
- Studio: Pye Studios, London, England
- Genre: Rock and roll
- Length: 2:05
- Label: Kapp KJB-27
- Songwriter: Jerry Leiber and Mike Stoller
- Producer: Tony Hatch

The Searchers singles chronology
"When You Walk in the Room" (1964)	"Love Potion Number Nine" (1964)	"What Have They Done to the Rain" (1964)

Official Audio
- "Love Potion No. 9" on YouTube

"Love Potion No. 9" – also styled as "Love Potion Number 9", "Love Potion #9", and "Love Potion Nr. 9" – is a song written in 1959 by Jerry Leiber and Mike Stoller, which has been successfully recorded by a number of performers, mostly in the 1960s and 1970s.

It was first recorded in 1959 by the Clovers, who took it to No. 23 on both the US pop and R&B charts that year, and No. 20 in Canada. The Searchers recorded it in 1964 and reached No. 3 on the U.S. Billboard Hot 100 and No. 2 on Cash Box during the winter of 1965. Herb Alpert and the Tijuana Brass recorded an instrumental version for their 1965 album Whipped Cream & Other Delights. The Coasters released their take in December 1971 with "D.W. Washburn" on the B-side. It reached No. 76 on the Billboard Pop chart, No. 96 on the Cash Box chart and No. 20 on the Australian KMR Chart. It is also the first track on the studio album Two Days Away, released in 1977 by Elkie Brooks and produced by the song's writers.

== History ==
The song describes a man seeking help to find love. He enlists the help of a Gypsy woman named "Madame Ruth" ("Madame Rue" in the Searchers' recording) who determines, by means of palmistry, that he needs "love potion number nine". The potion, a philter, causes him to fall in love with everything he sees, kissing whatever is in front of him, eventually kissing a policeman on the street corner, who reacts by breaking his bottle of love potion.

In the LP release, at the ending of the song the Clovers used the alternative lyrics:

I had so much fun that I'm going back again,
I wonder what'll happen with Love Potion Number Ten?

This version was used in the film American Graffiti and released on the LP version of the soundtrack, but replaced by the single version on the CD release.

The song was the basic premise of the 1992 film of the same name starring Sandra Bullock and Tate Donovan.

== Charts, The Searchers ==
Chart (1965)	Peak position
Australia KMR	20
Canada (RPM)	6
New Zealand (Lever Hit Parade)	4
US Billboard Hot 100	3
US Cash Box Top 100	2
West Germany (GfK)	23

== Later versions ==
The heavy metal band Tygers of Pan Tang recorded "Love Potion No. 9" in 1982. Their version charted in the UK, reaching No. 45 in 1982. Punk band MDC released their version of the song on their 1989 album Metal Devil Cokes The White Stripes covered it live at the Gold Dollar in Detroit, Michigan, on July 14, 1997, including the alternative ending lyrics; this version was released in 2012 on the EP "Live On Bastille Day". In 2016 the song was performed by John Cooper Clarke and Hugh Cornwell for BBC 6 Music Live. It was released as a single by indie rock band The Wallies in November 2019 and has also been covered by punk rock group The Queers on their 2021 album Reverberation. Rockapella also covered the song.

This song also gained popularity in Vietnam as US-based singer Nguyễn Hưng covered it in Vietnamese in 1998. A German language version of the song was released by Mama Betty's Band as Die Liebesmedizin in 1965.

The song gained newfound popularity on TikTok and Instagram when American alternative rock band Lyons Lane released their version in 2025.
