= Hi-Heel Sneakers =

1963 single by Tommy Tucker

Single by Tommy Tucker
- B-side: "Don't Want 'Cha (Watcha Gonna Do)"
- Released: 1964
- Recorded: 1963
- Genre: Blues
- Length: 2:45
- Label: Checker
- Songwriter: Robert Higginbotham a.k.a. Tommy Tucker
- Producer: Herb Abramson

Tommy Tucker singles chronology
"Hi-Heel Sneakers" (1964)	"Long Tall Shorty" (1964)

"Hi-Heel Sneakers" (often also spelled "High Heel Sneakers") is a blues song written and recorded by American singer-songwriter Tommy Tucker in 1963. Blues writer Mary Katherine Aldin describes it as an uptempo twelve-bar blues, with "a spare, lilting musical framework", and a strong vocal. The song's rhythmic approach has also been compared to that of Jimmy Reed. Tucker's lyrics recall the time he spent as a Golden Gloves boxer in the 1950s:

Put on your red dress baby
Lord we're goin' out tonight (2×)
And wear some boxin' gloves
In case some fool might wanna fight

== Background and recording ==
The song came out of Tucker's association with producer Herb Abramson, who was a co-founder of Atlantic Records. Abramson operated A-1 Sound Studios in New York, where many popular R&B artists recorded; he leased Tucker's recording to Checker Records, which released it as a single in 1964.

Although writers cite a 1963 recording date, there is conflicting information about the studio location. Aldin puts it in Chicago, while the Blues Foundation locates it in New York City. The song's distinctive guitar parts are provided by Dean Young. Writing in Encyclopedia of the Blues, Gene Tomko notes the similarity to the introduction and shuffle beat of the popular Jimmy Reed song "Big Boss Man".

== Release and chart performance ==
Abramson leased Tucker's song to Checker Records and in 1964 it was released as a single, backed with "Don't Want 'Cha (Watcha Gonna Do)". It entered Billboard Hot 100 on February 8, 1964, where the single reached number eleven during an 11-week stay (its R&B chart was suspended at the time). In the UK, it reached number 23.

== Answer song ==
In 1964, Sugar Pie DeSanto recorded an answer song titled "Slip-In Mules (No High Heel Sneakers)". It was written by Tucker and Billy Davis: "they both heard Sugar Pie DeSantos's voice in their heads as they put the finishing touches on the tune. It was written in one day, recorded the next, and on the charts a few weeks after it was released". The lyrics play on "Hi-Heel Sneakers", which DeSantos sang in the style of the original:

Baby my red dress in the cleaners, but my shift will steal the show
Can't wear my high-heel sneakers cause they hurt my toes so bad
So wear some spats and calfskin shoes to match my low-heeled slip-in mules

The single, released by Chess Records, reached number 48 on Billboard's Hot 100 (its R&B chart was suspended at the time).

== Legacy ==
In 2017, the song was inducted into the Blues Foundation Blues Hall of Fame as a "classic of blues recording". In its induction statement, the Blues Foundation noted that "Hi-Heel Sneakers" was the "last blues record from the mighty Chess Records [Checker subsidiary] catalogue to hit No. 1 on the charts" and its popularity as a performance number.

Numerous musicians have recorded "Hi-Heel Sneakers" – Aldin notes the song "has the distinction of having been recorded by such unlikely musical bedfellows as Johnny Rivers, Elvis Presley, Ramsey Lewis, Ronnie Milsap, Jose Feliciano, Chuck Berry, the Chambers Brothers, Jerry Lee Lewis, David Cassidy and Boots Randolph, to name but a few." Paul McCartney performed a live version on MTV Unplugged, also released as an album. Tomko explains its influence:

This now-familiar rhythmic chord progression of accenting the beat a la "Hi-Heel Sneakers" was in turn incorporated into many cover versions of "Big Boss Man," and ironically influenced how the Jimmy Reed standard is typically played today.
