= Needles and Pins (song) =

1963 single by Jackie DeShannon

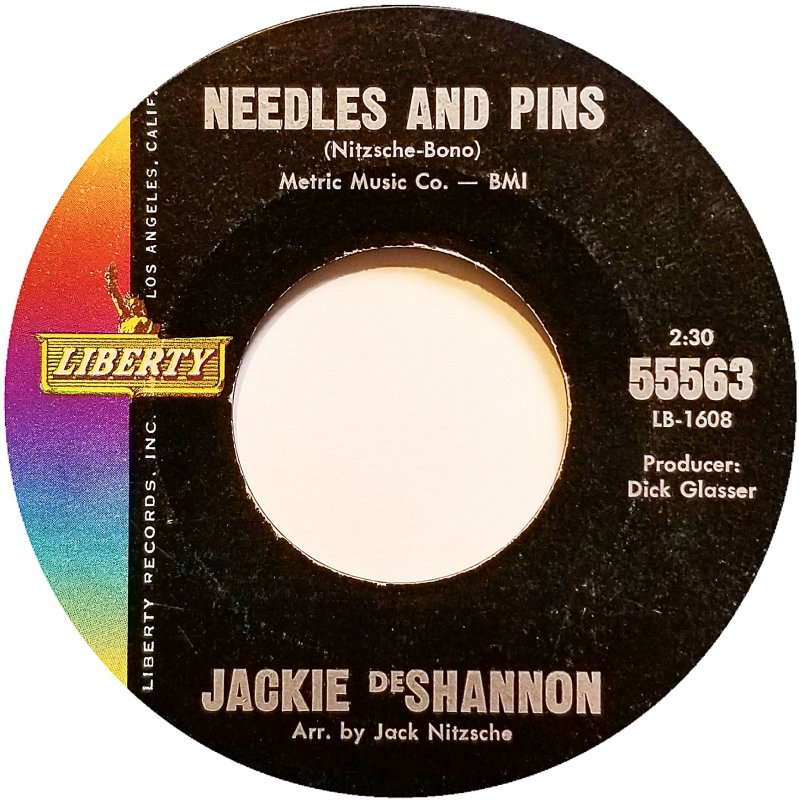
- Side A of the original US single

Single by Jackie DeShannon

from the album Jackie DeShannon
- B-side: "Did He Call Today, Mama?"
- Released: April 11, 1963
- Recorded: February 20, 1963
- Genre: Rock; folk; soul
- Length: 2:30
- Label: Liberty
- Songwriters: Jack Nitzsche; Sonny Bono
- Producer: Dick Glasser

Jackie DeShannon singles chronology
"Faded Love" (1962)	"Needles and Pins" (1963)	"Little Yellow Roses" (1963)

"Needles and Pins" is a rock song credited to American songwriters Jack Nitzsche and Sonny Bono. Jackie DeShannon recorded it in 1963 and other versions followed. The most successful ones were by The Searchers, whose version reached No. 1 on the UK singles chart in 1964, and Smokie, who had a worldwide hit in 1977. Others who have notably recorded the song include fellow singer and Bono's then-wife Cher, the Ramones, and Tom Petty and the Heartbreakers with Stevie Nicks.

== Jackie DeShannon recording ==
In his autobiography, Bono states that he sang along with Nitzsche's guitar-playing, thus creating both the tune and the lyrics, being guided by the chord progressions. However, Jackie DeShannon claims that the song was written at the piano, and that she was a full participant in the song's creation, along with Nitzsche and Bono, although she did not get formal credit.

DeShannon was the first to record the song; in the US it peaked at number 84 on the Billboard Hot 100 singles chart in May 1963. Though it was only a minor US hit, DeShannon's recording of the song topped the charts in Canada, hitting number one on the CHUM Chart in July 1963.

Chart (1963)	Peak position
Canada (CHUM Hit Parade)	1
U.S. Billboard Hot 100	84

== The Searchers version ==
"Needles and Pins"
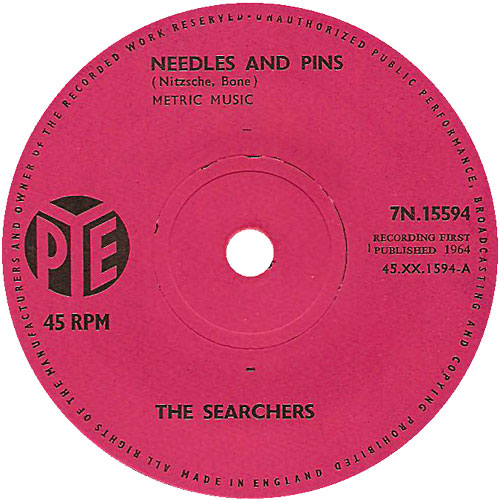
- Side A of the original UK single

Single by the Searchers

from the album It's the Searchers
- B-side: "Saturday Night Out"
- Released: January 7, 1964
- Recorded: December 16–17, 1963
- Studio: Pye, London
- Genre: Jangle pop; folk rock
- Length: 2:14
- Label: Pye (UK); Kapp (US)
- Songwriters: Jack Nitzsche; Sonny Bono
- Producer: Tony Hatch

The Searchers singles chronology
"Sweet Nothins" (1963)	"Needles and Pins" (1964)	"Don't Throw Your Love Away" (1964)

The Searchers heard British performer Cliff Bennett perform "Needles and Pins" at the Star-Club in Hamburg, Germany, instantly wanted it to be their next single and recorded it before Bennett could. The band recorded their version on December 16 and 17, 1963 at Pye Studios. The Pye Records single was released on January 7, 1964. It was number one in the United Kingdom, Ireland and South Africa and peaked at number 13 on the Billboard Hot 100 singles chart in the United States. Soon after, in April 1964, "Needles and Pins" appeared on the Searchers' next album, It's the Searchers.

Audible during the Searchers' recording of "Needles and Pins" is a faulty bass drum pedal, which squeaks throughout the song. It is particularly noticeable during the opening of the number.

Part of the Searchers' version can be heard as the intro of the song "Use the Man" from Megadeth's Cryptic Writings album, although it does not appear on the remastered version.

A German version sung by the Searchers is called "Tausend Nadelstiche" ("A Thousand Pinpricks").

=== Charts ===
Chart (1964)	Peak position
Canada	14
Finnish Singles Charts	31
French Singles Chart	29
German Singles Chart	8
Irish Singles Chart	1
Norway (VG-lista)	5
Swedish Singles Chart	5
UK Singles Chart	1
US Billboard Hot 100	13
Norwegian Singles Chart	8
South African Singles Chart	1

== Cher version ==
"Needles and Pins"
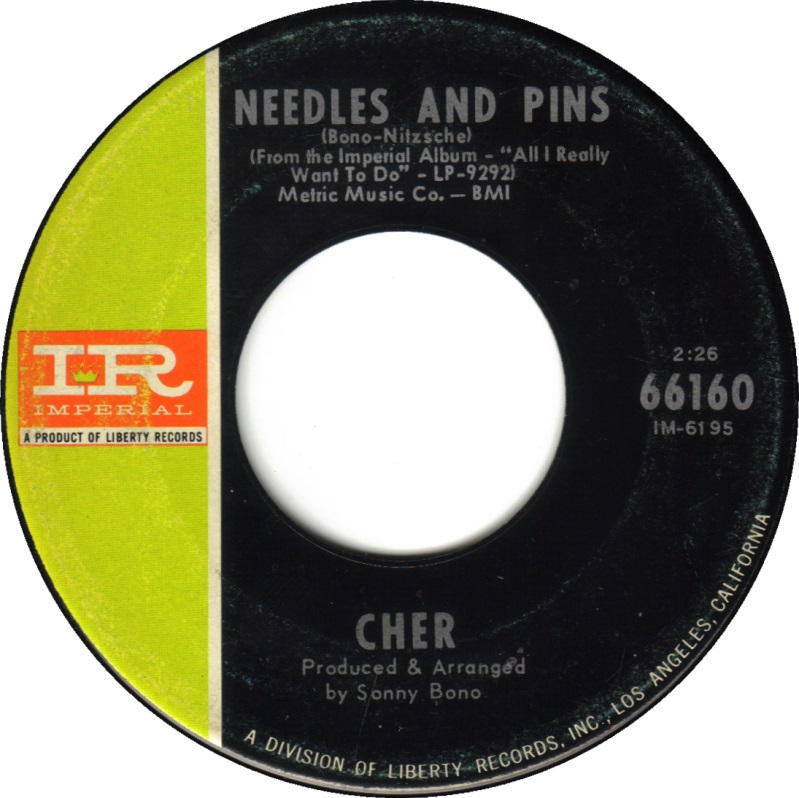

Single by Cher

from the album All I Really Want to Do
- A-side: "Bang Bang (My Baby Shot Me Down)"
- Released: March 1966
- Recorded: 1965
- Studio: Gold Star, Los Angeles
- Genre: Folk-pop
- Length: 2:26
- Label: Imperial
- Songwriters: Jack Nitzsche; Sonny Bono
- Producer: Sonny Bono

In 1965, the song was covered by American singer/actress and Bono's then-wife and Sonny & Cher bandmate Cher for her debut solo album All I Really Want to Do, which was produced and arranged by Bono himself and later replaced her cover of Ruby & the Romantics' 1962 hit "Our Day Will Come" as the B-side on the US and Italy versions of her 1966 single "Bang Bang (My Baby Shot Me Down)". In a review by Matthew Holder for Beyond the Encore in a retrospective article commemorating the sixtieth anniversary of All I Really Want to Do, her version was described as being delivered with "languid melancholy" compared to The Searchers' "jangly and insistent" version.

== Smokie version ==
"Needles and Pins"
- UK single sleeve

Single by Smokie

from the album Bright Lights & Back Alleys
- B-side: "No One Could Ever Love You More"
- Released: September 30, 1977
- Recorded: Spring 1977
- Studio: Whitney, Glendale
- Genre: Soft rock
- Length: 2:52 (single version): 2:42 (album version)
- Label: RAK
- Songwriters: Jack Nitzsche; Sonny Bono
- Producer: Mike Chapman

Smokie singles chronology
"It's Your Life" (1977)	"Needles and Pins" (1977)	"For a Few Dollars More" (1978)

In 1977, at the height of their popularity, British rock band Smokie recorded the song as a rock ballad for the album Bright Lights & Back Alleys, and got a European and an Australian hit with "Needles and Pins". The song reached number one in Austria. Later, ex-Smokie vocalist Chris Norman included his solo cover of the song on his studio album Full Circle (2000).

=== Charts ===
==== Weekly charts ====
Chart (1977–1978)	Peak position
UK Singles (Official Charts)	10
Australia (Kent Music Report)	7
Austria (Ö3 Austria Top 40)	1
Belgium (Ultratop 50 Flanders)	5
Belgium (Ultratop 50 Wallonia)	17
Germany (GfK)	2
Netherlands (Single Top 100)	5
Norway (VG-lista)	4
Switzerland (Schweizer Hitparade)	7
US Billboard Hot 100	68

==== Year-end charts ====
Year-end chart performance for "Needles and Pins"
Chart (1978)	Position
Australia (Kent Music Report)	48

== Ramones version ==
"Needles and Pins"
- US single sleeve

Single by Ramones

from the album Road to Ruin
- B-side: "I Wanted Everything"
- Released: February 1979
- Recorded: Summer 1978
- Studio: Mediasound, New York City
- Genre: Punk rock; surf punk; bubblegum
- Length: 2:20
- Label: Sire
- Producers: T. Erdelyi, Ed Stasium

Ramones singles chronology
"Don't Come Close" (1978)	"Needles and Pins" (1979)	"She's the One" (1979)

Audio
- "Needles and Pins" on YouTube

The Ramones' cover of "Needles and Pins" appears on their fourth studio album, Road to Ruin, released in 1978. The version of the song that appeared on the album was later issued as a single.

The Ramones' version of "Needles and Pins" is notable within their early catalog. Its inclusion marks an instance where the band chose to record a melodic, pop-oriented song. The track was one of a small handful of songs on the Road to Ruin album that pushed beyond the extremely short, rigid song structure that defined their first three records. This approach to recording classic-style pop music in their punk-rock style was consistent with the band's appreciation for 1960s rock and roll.

Rolling Stone critic Charles Young noted that the song could have easily been a joke, but was not since Joey "really puts his guts into these antiquated but beautiful lyrics and pulls it off".

== Tom Petty and the Heartbreakers version ==
"Needles and Pins"

Single by Tom Petty and the Heartbreakers featuring Stevie Nicks

from the album Pack up the Plantation: Live!
- Released: December 1985
- Recorded: June 1981
- Venue: The Forum, Los Angeles
- Genre: Rock
- Length: 2:25
- Label: MCA
- Songwriters: Jack Nitzsche; Sonny Bono

Tom Petty and the Heartbreakers singles chronology
"So You Want to Be a Rock 'n' Roll Star (Live)" (1985)	"Needles and Pins" (1985)	"Refugee (Live)" (1986)

Stevie Nicks singles chronology
"I Can't Wait" (1985)	"Needles and Pins" (1985)	"Has Anyone Ever Written Anything for You?" (1986)

Tom Petty and the Heartbreakers released their first live album in 1985 called Pack Up the Plantation: Live! where singer-songwriter and Fleetwood Mac vocalist Stevie Nicks performed on "Needles and Pins" with Tom Petty at the Forum in Los Angeles, California in June 1981.

Cash Box said that "a great song is given a great treatment."

=== Charts ===
Chart (1985)	Peak position
Canadian RPM Top Singles	85
South African Springbok Top 20 Top Singles	3
U.S. Billboard Hot 100	37
U.S. Billboard Album Rock Tracks	17

== Other versions ==
The song was also covered by The Commercials on the 2001 Ramones tribute album Ramones Maniacs.
