= Sweets for My Sweet =

1961 single by the Drifters

Single by the Drifters

from the album Save the Last Dance for Me
- B-side: "Loneliness or Happiness"
- Released: 1961
- Genre: R&B; doo-wop
- Length: 2:32
- Label: Atlantic
- Songwriters: Doc Pomus; Mort Shuman

The Drifters singles chronology
"Please Stay" (1961)	"Sweets for My Sweet" (1961)	"Room Full of Tears" (1961)

"Sweets for My Sweet" is a song written by the songwriting team of Doc Pomus and Mort Shuman, originally recorded by American doo-wop and R&B/soul vocal group the Drifters. In 1994, British reggae singer C. J. Lewis had a successful European hit with his version of the song.

== The Drifters version ==
The group's first single featuring Charlie Thomas on lead vocal, "Sweets for My Sweet" reached No. 16 on the US Billboard Hot 100 and No. 10 on the R&B chart, in October 1961. This was one of the few post-1958 Drifters singles that did not feature a string section. The song has a strong piano and bongo-led Cuban-style cha-cha rhythm. It also featured Jimmy Radcliffe and four female backup vocalists, all of whom would later have hit records: Cissy Houston, Doris Troy, Dionne Warwick, and Dee Dee Warwick. The recording also features an up-in-front piano provided by co-writer Mort Shuman. Other musicians on the recording included George Barnes and Allan Hanlon on guitar, Abie Baker on bass, Ed Shaughnessy and Gary Chester on drums and Bobby Rosengarden and Ray Kessler on percussion.

== The Searchers version ==
"Sweets for My Sweet"

Single by the Searchers

from the album Meet The Searchers
- B-side: "It's All Been a Dream"
- Released: June 4, 1963
- Genre: Merseybeat
- Length: 2:31
- Label: Pye (7N15533)
- Songwriters: Doc Pomus; Mort Shuman
- Producer: Tony Hatch

The Searchers singles chronology
"Sweets for My Sweet" (1963)	"Sugar and Spice" (1963)

In 1963, "Sweets for My Sweet" was released by English Merseybeat band the Searchers as their debut single on June 4, 1963, reaching No. 1 on the UK Singles Chart for two weeks that August. According to Bill Harry, Dusty Springfield considered the Searchers' recording of the song to be "the best record to come out of Liverpool" as of July 1963. This version was also issued in the US in 1964 but failed to chart.

== C. J. Lewis version ==
"Sweets for My Sweet"

Single by C. J. Lewis

from the album Dollars
- B-side: "Sweets for My Sweet" (ska 7-inch)
- Released: April 11, 1994
- Studio: Eden (London, England)
- Genre: Reggae; new jack swing
- Length: 4:33 (12-inch); 3:24 (7-inch)
- Label: Black Market International
- Songwriters: Doc Pomus; Mort Shuman
- Producers: C. J. Lewis; Phillip Leo

C. J. Lewis singles chronology
"Sweets for My Sweet" (1994)	"Uptight (Everything's Alright)" (1994)

Music video
- "Sweets for My Sweet" on YouTube

British reggae singer C. J. Lewis released his version of "Sweets for My Sweet" as his debut single in April 1994 via Black Market International and MCA Records. It reached No. 3 in the United Kingdom, the Netherlands, and New Zealand. The song was produced by Phillip Leo, who also produced Lewis' debut album, Dollars (1994). The female vocals are performed by singer Samantha Depasois. Jerome Redfarne directed the accompanying music video.

=== Background and release ===
An engineer in a London studio had recommended C. J. Lewis to Black Market label director Rene Gelston. On a Sunday night Lewis played the tape of his recording of "Sweets for My Sweet" for Gelston over the phone. Monday morning, he signed Lewis first thing in morning. Gelston told, "I knew this was a hit straightaway." The single was released on April 11, 1994. It became MCA Records' biggest domestic dance hit for five years.

=== Critical reception ===
Upon the release, pan-European magazine Music & Media remarked that the Searchers 1963 classic had been completely reworked in "a dead trendy ragga version, which is so cheerful that you can't believe storms and depression ever existed." They added, "Nobody will be surprised that it's heavily played on Bay Radio/St. Julian's on holiday island Malta." Music & Media editor Robbert Tilli wrote, "It's now loved by the kids of those who were young in the '60s. The song is the same, only the fashion has changed. But there's more, the morals have altered too... The hidden meaning of the lyrics—sex—not apparent then in its harmless pop vogue, is crystal clear now. A dirty mind is a joy forever, and Lewis knows it."

Alan Jones from Music Week said, "Yes, it is the old Searchers hit, and it sounds surprisingly good too considering it has been dragged uncompromisingly into the Nineties. Now an easy to swallow confection, part reggae, part jackswing, it slips down a treat." James Hamilton from the Record Mirror Dance Update named it a "gruff raggamuffin sung old Drifters/Searchers classic's catchily jiggling pure pop 116.7bpm Original 12"" in his weekly dance column. Pete Stanton from Smash Hits gave Lewis' version a score of four out of five, adding, "Though CJ's a bit of a star in the reggae charts he has yet to set the proper charts alight — but Sweets should do that." He also remarked that the singer "has reggaed it up and turned it into a groovy, radio-friendly bopper."

=== Chart performance ===
In addition to reaching No. 3 on the UK Singles Chart, "Sweets for My Sweet" also had big success in New Zealand, peaking for two weeks at No. 3. After debuting at No. 6, it then spent a further 10 consecutive weeks inside the top 10. After dropping to No.11 the following week, it returned to No. 6. Six weeks later after fluctuating around the top 40, it returned for one final week in the top 10, at No. 10. At the end of 1994, the song was ranked No. 6 on New Zealand's year-end chart. "Sweets for My Sweet" was also a top-ten hit in Austria, Belgium, Iceland, Ireland, the Netherlands, and Switzerland. The track also charted in Australia and Germany.

=== Music video ===
The music video for "Sweets for My Sweet" was directed by Jerome Redfarne. It was a Box Top on British music television channel The Box in May 1994. Two months later, the video received active rotation on MTV Europe and was B-listed on France's MCM in July 1994.

=== Track listings ===
- 7-inch vinyl, UK (1994)
1. "Sweets for My Sweet" (7-inch version)
2. "Sweets for My Sweet" (ska 7-inch)
- CD single, Europe (1994)
1. "Sweets for My Sweet" (original 7-inch) – 3:24
2. "Sweets for My Sweet" (ska 7-inch) – 3:47
3. "Sweets for My Sweet" (original 12-inch) – 4:33
- CD single, UK (1994)
1. "Sweets for My Sweet" (original 7-inch) – 3:24
2. "Sweets for My Sweet" (ska 7-inch) – 3:47
3. "Sweets for My Sweet" (original 12-inch) – 4:33
4. "Sweets for My Sweet" (ska straight mix) – 4:01
5. "Sweets for My Sweet" (dub mix 1) – 4:01
6. "Sweets for My Sweet" (original dub) – 3:23

=== Charts ===
==== Weekly charts ====
Chart (1994)	Peak position
Australia (ARIA)	45
Austria (Ö3 Austria Top 40)	9
Belgium (Ultratop 50 Flanders)	9
Europe (Eurochart Hot 100)	13
Europe (European AC Radio)	15
Europe (European Dance Radio)	18
Europe (European Hit Radio)	9
Finland (IFPI)	11
Germany (GfK)	28
Iceland (Íslenski Listinn Topp 40)	7
Ireland (IRMA)	6
Israel (Israeli Singles Chart)	22
Netherlands (Dutch Top 40)	3
Netherlands (Single Top 100)	4
New Zealand (Recorded Music NZ)	3
Scottish Singles Sales (Official Charts)	15
Sweden (Sverigetopplistan)	16
Switzerland (Schweizer Hitparade)	6
UK Singles (Official Charts)	3
UK Airplay (Music Week)	1
UK Dance (Music Week)	6
UK Club Chart (Music Week)	44

==== Year-end charts ====
Chart (1994)	Position
Belgium (Ultratop)	58
Europe (Eurochart Hot 100)	60
Europe (European Hit Radio)	33
Iceland (Íslenski Listinn Topp 40)	88
Netherlands (Dutch Top 40)	48
Netherlands (Single Top 100)	59
New Zealand (RIANZ)	6
Sweden (Topplistan)	92
Switzerland (Schweizer Hitparade)	28
UK Singles (OCC)	41
UK Airplay (Music Week)	12

=== Certifications ===
Region	Certification	Certified units/sales
New Zealand (RMNZ)	Platinum	10,000^{*}
^{*} Sales figures based on certification alone.

=== Release history ===
Region	Date	Format(s)	Label(s)	Ref.
United Kingdom	April 11, 1994	12-inch vinyl	Black Market International	
United Kingdom	April 18, 1994	7-inch vinyl; 12-inch vinyl; CD; cassette	Black Market International	
Australia	June 13, 1994	CD; cassette	Black Market International; MCA	
Japan	August 3, 1994	Mini-CD	MCA	

== Other cover versions ==
- Yugoslav band Džentlmeni released a Serbo-Croatian version, entitled "Slatko" ("Sweet"), on their 1968 debut EP Idi (Go).
- A cover of "Sweets for My Sweet" by UK hard rock band Magnum was released in February 1975 as their debut single, featuring lead vocals by Dave Morgan.
- In the UK, Tina Charles remade "Sweets for My Sweet" in 1977 in tandem with "Love Bug". The track was included on her album Rendezvous and issued as a single reaching No. 26; however the single edit only featured one chorus from "Sweets for My Sweet" at its close.
- The only US remake of "Sweets for My Sweet" to reach the Hot 100 or any Billboard chart to date is that by Tony Orlando which reached No. 54 and No. 20 on the Hot Adult Contemporary chart in 1979.
