= List of Budgie band members =

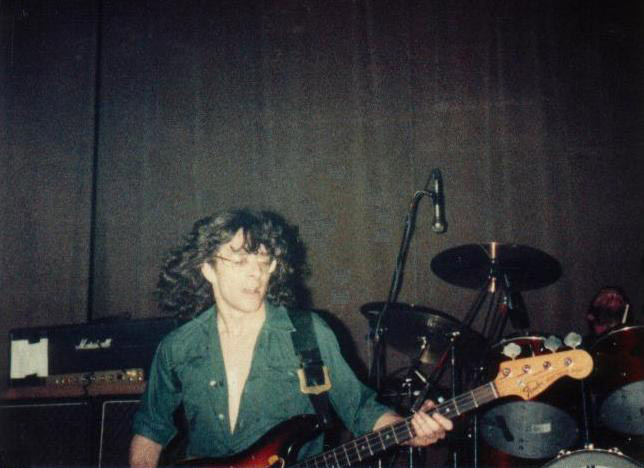
Burke Shelley and Steve Williams performing with Budgie in 1981.

Budgie were a Welsh heavy metal band from Cardiff. Formed in late 1967, the group originally consisted of lead vocalist and bassist Burke Shelley, guitarists and backing vocalists Tony Bourge and Brian Goddard, and drummer Ray Phillips. The group broke up in 2010, when their lineup featured Shelley, drummer Steve Williams (originally a member from 1974 to 1986, and later since 1999), and guitarist Craig Goldy (who joined in 2008).

== History ==
=== 1967–1988 ===
Budgie were formed in late 1967. The original lineup featured Burke Shelley, Brian Goddard, Tony Bourge and Ray Phillips. By early 1970, Goddard had left the group because, according to Shelley, "he got a girl pregnant and suddenly had to get a job". The remaining trio released Budgie in 1971, Squawk in 1972 and Never Turn Your Back on a Friend in 1973. By the end of 1973, Phillips had left Budgie. He was replaced by Pete Boot, who debuted on In for the Kill! released the following year. After around a year with the band, Boot was replaced at the end of 1974 by Steve Williams. Bandolier, If I Were Brittania I'd Waive the Rules and Impeckable followed, before Bourge left in the summer of 1978. He later recalled that "I would've loved to have carried on, but after a while the lifestyle gets to you."

Bourge was replaced by former Trapeze guitarist Rob Kendrick, while former Hawkwind guitarist Huw Lloyd-Langton also joined briefly. By the end of the summer, the latter had left and the group reverted to a trio. After briefly relocating to Texas, the band fired Kendrick and replaced him with "Big" John Thomas at the end of 1979. This lineup remained constant throughout the rest of the 1980s, releasing the EP If Swallowed, Do Not Induce Vomiting in 1980, followed by three studio albums: Power Supply (1980), Nightflight (1981) and Deliver Us from Evil (1982). After a few more years touring, Budgie were dropped by RCA Records and Williams left in mid-1986, replaced by Jim Simpson of UFO. Two more years of touring followed, before the group disbanded following a final show in May 1988.

=== 1995–2022 ===
In early 1995, Burke Shelley and John Thomas reformed Budgie with drummer Robert "Congo" Jones (formerly of Love Sculpture) for a select number of American shows. The group reformed again in mid-1999, with Steve Williams returning on drums. In February 2002, Thomas was forced to leave the band after suffering a stroke which rendered him unable to perform effectively. He was replaced by Andy Hart, who debuted on Life in San Antonio recorded in the summer. The following March, Hart was forced to leave for "personal reasons". He was replaced by Simon Lees.

Lees performed on 2006's You're All Living in Cuckooland, Budgie's first studio album since 1982. He later left in July 2007, with Andy James taking his place in October. By January 2008, James had been replaced by Dio guitarist Craig Goldy on a part-time "special guest" basis. In November 2010, Budgie were forced to cancel a European tour after Shelley suffered an aortic aneurysm for which he underwent surgery. The band have not performed since, with Shelley announcing in 2020 that his condition had worsened, and that he planned to release a final album of unreleased Budgie tracks. Shelley died on January 10, 2022, aged 71, in his hometown of Cardiff.

== Members ==
=== Final ===
Image	Name	Years active	Instruments	Release contributions
	Burke Shelley	1967–1988; 1995–1996; 1999–2010 (died 2022)	bass; lead vocals; keyboards	all Budgie releases
	Steve Williams	1974–1986; 1999–2010	drums; percussion; backing vocals	all Budgie releases from Bandolier (1975) onward
	Craig Goldy	2008–2010	guitar	none

=== Former ===
Image	Name	Years active	Instruments	Release contributions
	Kevin Newton	1967–1968	guitar	none
	Brian Goddard	1967–1970	guitar; backing vocals	none
	Ray Phillips	1967–1973	drums; percussion	Budgie (1971); "Crash Course in Brain Surgery" (1971); Squawk (1972); Never Turn Your Back on a Friend (1973); Heavier Than Air: Rarest Eggs (1998); The BBC Recordings (2004)
	Tony Bourge	1968–1978	guitar; backing and occasional lead vocals	all Budgie releases from Budgie (1971) to Impeckable (1977); Heavier Than Air: Rarest Eggs (1998); The BBC Recordings (2004); Radio Sessions 1974 & 1978 (2005)
	Pete Boot	1973–1974 (died 2018)	drums	In for the Kill! (1974); Heavier Than Air: Rarest Eggs (1998); Radio Sessions 1974 & 1978 (2005)
	Rob Kendrick	1978–1979	guitar; backing vocals	The Last Stage (2004) – one track only
	Huw Lloyd-Langton	1978 (died 2012)	guitar; backing vocals	none
	"Big" John Thomas	1979–1988; 1995–1996; 1999–2002 (died 2016)	guitar; backing vocals	all Budgie releases from If Swallowed, Do Not Induce Vomiting (1980) to We Came, We Saw... (1998); The Last Stage (2004); The BBC Recordings (2004)
	Jim Simpson	1986–1988	drums	none
	Robert "Congo" Jones	1995–1996	drums	none
	Andy Hart	2002–2003	guitar; backing vocals	Life in San Antonio (2002)
	Simon Lees	2003–2007	guitar; backing vocals	You're All Living in Cuckooland (2006)
	Andy James	2007–2008	guitar	none

=== Backup ===
Image	Name	Years active	Instruments	Release contributions
	Myfyr Isaac	1975–1978	guitar; backing vocals	Heavier Than Air: Rarest Eggs (1998); The BBC Recordings (2004); Radio Sessions 1974 & 1978 (2005)
	Duncan Mackay	1982 (session)	keyboards	Deliver Us from Evil (1982)
	Lindsey Bridgewater	1982 (touring)	keyboards	We Came, We Saw... (1998); The BBC Recordings (2004)

== Lineups ==
Period	Members	Releases
Late 1967 – early 1968	Burke Shelley – lead vocals, bass; Kevin Newton – guitar; Brian Goddard – guitar, backing vocals; Ray Phillips – drums, percussion	none
Early 1968 – early 1970	Burke Shelley – lead vocals, bass; Tony Bourge – guitar, backing vocals; Brian Goddard – guitar, backing vocals; Ray Phillips – drums, percussion	none
Early 1970 – late 1973	Burke Shelley – lead vocals, bass; Tony Bourge – guitar, backing vocals; Ray Phillips – drums, percussion	Budgie (1971); "Crash Course in Brain Surgery" (1971); Squawk (1972); Never Turn Your Back on a Friend (1973); Heavier Than Air (1998) – eight tracks; The BBC Recordings (2004) – four tracks
Late 1973 – late 1974	Burke Shelley – lead vocals, bass; Tony Bourge – guitar, backing vocals; Pete Boot – drums	In for the Kill! (1974); Heavier Than Air (1998) – two tracks; Radio Sessions 1974 & 1978 (2005) – six tracks
Late 1974 – summer 1978	Burke Shelley – lead vocals, bass; Tony Bourge – guitar, backing vocals; Steve Williams – drums, percussion	Bandolier (1975); If I Were Brittania I'd Waive the Rules (1976); Impeckable (1978); Heavier Than Air (1998) – 12 tracks; The BBC Recordings (2004) – two tracks; Radio Sessions 1974 & 1978 (2005) – ten tracks
Summer 1978	Burke Shelley – lead vocals, bass; Rob Kendrick – guitar, backing vocals; Huw Lloyd-Langton – guitar, backing vocals; Steve Williams – drums, percussion	none
Summer 1978 – late 1979	Burke Shelley – lead vocals, bass; Rob Kendrick – guitar, backing vocals; Steve Williams – drums, percussion	The Last Stage (2004) – one track
Late 1979 – mid-1986	Burke Shelley – lead vocals, bass; John Thomas – guitar, backing vocals; Steve Williams – drums, percussion	If Swallowed, Do Not Induce Vomiting (1980); Power Supply (1980); Nightflight (1981); Deliver Us from Evil (1982); Heavier Than Air (1998) – three tracks; We Came, We Saw... (1998); The Last Stage (2004) – 15 tracks; The BBC Recordings (2004) – 17 tracks
Mid-1986 – May 1988	Burke Shelley – lead vocals, bass; John Thomas – guitar, backing vocals; Jim Simpson – drums	none
Band inactive May 1988 – early 1995
Early 1995 – summer 1996	Burke Shelley – lead vocals, bass; John Thomas – guitar, backing vocals; Robert Jones – drums	none
Band inactive summer 1996 – mid-1999
Mid-1999 – February 2002	Burke Shelley – lead vocals, bass; John Thomas – guitar, backing vocals; Steve Williams – drums, percussion	none
February 2002 – February 2003	Burke Shelley – lead vocals, bass; Andy Hart – guitar, backing vocals; Steve Williams – drums, percussion	Life in San Antonio (2002)
February 2003 – July 2007	Burke Shelley – lead vocals, bass; Simon Lees – guitar, backing vocals; Steve Williams – drums, percussion	You're All Living in Cuckooland (2006)
October 2007 – January 2008	Burke Shelley – lead vocals, bass; Andy James – guitar; Steve Williams – drums, percussion	none
January 2008 – November 2010	Burke Shelley – lead vocals, bass; Craig Goldy – guitar; Steve Williams – drums, percussion	none
