= Best of Budgie (1997 album) =

The Best of Budgie

Compilation album by Budgie
- Released: 1997
- Recorded: 1973–1975
- Genre: Hard rock, heavy metal
- Length: 69:52
- Producer: Budgie

Budgie chronology
An Ecstasy of Fumbling – The Definitive Anthology (1996)	The Best of Budgie (1997)	We Came, We Saw... (1997)

Professional ratings
Review scores
Source	Rating
Allmusic	4.5/5 stars

The Best of Budgie was the fourth compilation album by Welsh rock band Budgie, released in 1997. The compilation contained tracks only from the third, fourth and fifth studio albums, much like the 1975 compilation of the same name.

== Track listing ==
All tracks are written by Burke Shelley and Tony Bourge, except where noted

No.	Title	Writer(s)	Length
1.	"Breadfan"	Shelley, Bourge, Ray Phillips	6:06
2.	"In the Grip of a Tyrefitter's Hand"	Shelley, Bourge, Phillips	6:23
3.	"I Ain't No Mountain"	Andy Fairweather Low	3:33
4.	"In for the Kill"		6:25
5.	"I Can't See My Feelings"		5:51
6.	"Napoleon Bona-Parts 1 & 2"		7:15
7.	"Parents"	Shelley, Bourge, Phillips	10:12
8.	"Hammer and Tongs"		6:53
9.	"Breaking All the House Rules"		7:24
10.	"Zoom Club"		9:50

== Personnel ==
Budgie

- Burke Shelley - bass guitar, vocals (all tracks)
- Tony Bourge - guitar (all tracks)
- Ray Phillips - drums (tracks 1, 2 & 7)
- Pete Boot - drums (tracks 4, 8 & 10)
- Steve Williams - drums (tracks 3, 5, 6 & 9)
