= Best of Budgie (1975 album) =

Greatest hits album by Budgie
- Released: 1975
- Recorded: 1973–1975
- Genre: Rock
- Length: 61:18

Budgie chronology
Best of Budgie (1975)	Best of Budgie (1981)

Best of Budgie was the first compilation album by Welsh rock band Budgie, released in 1975. It contained tracks from the band's third, fourth and fifth studio albums. At over an hour in length, it is among the longest single-LP rock records.

== Track listing ==
All music is composed by Burke Shelley and Tony Bourge, except where noted.

Side one
No.	Title	Writer(s)	Length
1.	"Breadfan"	Shelley, Bourge, Ray Phillips	5:58
2.	"I Ain't No Mountain"	Andy Fairweather Low	3:15
3.	"I Can't See My Feelings"		5:47
4.	"Baby, Please Don't Go"	Big Joe Williams	5:26
5.	"Zoom Club"		9:42

Side two
No.	Title	Writer(s)	Length
1.	"Breaking All the House Rules"		7:20
2.	"Parents"	Shelley, Bourge, Phillips	11:10
3.	"In for the Kill"		6:17
4.	"In the Grip of a Tyrefitter's Hand"	Shelley, Bourge, Phillips	6:15

== Personnel ==
- Burke Shelley - bass, vocals
- Tony Bourge - guitar
- Ray Phillips - drums (tracks 1, 4, 7 & 9)
- Pete Boot - drums (tracks 5 & 8)
- Steve Williams - drums (tracks 2, 3 & 6)
