= Best of Budgie =

Best of Budgie may refer to:

- Best of Budgie (1975 album)
- Best of Budgie (1981 album)
- Best of Budgie (1997 album)
