= Best of Budgie (1981 album) =

Greatest hits album by Budgie
- Released: 1981
- Recorded: 1971–1972
- Genre: Hard rock, heavy metal
- Length: 42:18

Budgie chronology
Best of Budgie (1975)	Best of Budgie (1981)	An Ecstasy of Fumbling – The Definitive Anthology (1996)

Best of Budgie was the second compilation album by Welsh rock band Budgie, released in 1981. It named after the 1975 compilation of the same name. It consisted solely of tracks from the first two Budgie albums, Budgie and Squawk.

== Track listings ==
All music is composed by Burke Shelley, Tony Bourge and Ray Phillips.

Side one
No.	Title	Length
1.	"Whiskey River"	3:23
2.	"Guts"	4:21
3.	"Rolling Home Again" (listed as "Just Rolling Home Again")	1:43
4.	"Homicidal Suicidal"	6:42
5.	"Hot as a Docker's Armpit"	5:52

Side two
No.	Title	Length
1.	"Drugstore Woman"	3:15
2.	"Rocking Man"	5:25
3.	"You and I"	1:42
4.	"Rape of the Locks"	6:13
5.	"Stranded"	6:21

== Personnel ==
- Burke Shelley - bass, vocals
- Tony Bourge - guitar
- Ray Phillips - drums
