= List of Live at the BBC recordings =

Live at the BBC or BBC Recordings are pop and rock music recordings originally made for or by the BBC Light Programme or BBC Radio 1. Many recordings were released under several name variants.

== Live at the BBC ==
- Live at the BBC (The Beatles album), 1994
- On Air – Live at the BBC Volume 2 (The Beatles album), 2013
- Live at the BBC (The Beautiful South album)
- Live at the BBC (Robert Cray album), 2008
- Live at the BBC (Curved Air album), 1995
- Live at the BBC (Sandy Denny album), 2007
- Live at the BBC (Dire Straits album), 1995
- Live at the BBC (Electric Light Orchestra album), 1999
- Live at the BBC (Fairport Convention album), 2007
- Live at the BBC (Fleetwood Mac album), 1995
- Live at the BBC (Free album), 2006
- Live at the BBC (Focus album), 2004
- Live at the BBC (Steve Harley & Cockney Rebel album), 1995
- Live at the BBC (The Housemartins album)
- Live at the BBC: 1967–1970 (The Moody Blues album), 2007
- Live at the BBC (Shed Seven album), 2007
- Live at the BBC (Slade album), 2009
- Live at the BBC (Status Quo album), 2010
- Live at the BBC (Richard & Linda Thompson album), 2011
- Live at the BBC, Maria McKee, 1991
- Live at the BBC, The Hollies, 2018

== Live at the Beeb ==
- Live at the Beeb, the 2nd EP of The Universal, by Blur, 1995

== At the BBC ==
- Soft Cell at the BBC, 2003
- Pixies at the BBC, 1998
- At the Beeb, a 1989 album by Queen
- At the BBC (Siouxsie and the Banshees album), 2009
- Bowie at the Beeb, a 2000 David Bowie album
- At the BBC, a 2001 Mighty Mighty album
- At the BBC (Joe Jackson album), 2009
- At the BBC, a 2009 Shawn Phillips album
- R.E.M. at the BBC, a 2018 R.E.M. album

== BBC Sessions ==
- The BBC Sessions (Belle and Sebastian album), 2008
- BBC Sessions (The Searchers album), 2004
- BBC Sessions (Cocteau Twins album), 1999
- BBC Sessions (Cream album), 2003
- BBC Sessions (Rory Gallagher album), 1999
- BBC Sessions (The Jimi Hendrix Experience album), 1998
- BBC Sessions (Led Zeppelin album), 1997
- The BBC Sessions (Ocean Colour Scene)
- BBC Sessions (Saxon album), 1998
- BBC Sessions (The Specials album), 1998
- BBC Sessions (Texas album), 2007
- BBC Sessions (Tindersticks album), 2007
- BBC Sessions (Loudon Wainwright III album), 1998
- BBC Sessions (The Who album), 2000
- BBC Sessions (The Yardbirds album)
- BBC Sessions 1968–1970 (Deep Purple album), 2011
- The Complete BBC Sessions (Cast)
- Swing the Heartache: The BBC Sessions, a 1989 Bauhaus album
- The BBC Sessions (Electric Light Orchestra album), 1999
- The BBC Sessions (Small Faces album), 1999
- BBC Sessions (Green Day album), 2021
- BBC Sessions (2002) by The Nice
- The Complete BBC Sessions (1997) by Argent
- The BBC Sessions 1989–2001 (2008) by The Orb
- BBC Sessions (1997) by The Delgados
- Taking On the World: Deluxe Edition - Disc Three: BBC Sessions, by Gun
- BBC Sessions: 1964–1977 (2001) by The Kinks
- The Complete BBC Concert & Session Recordings 1970–1973 (2024) by Faces

== Radio 1 Sessions ==
- The Radio One Sessions (Syd Barrett album), 2004
- Radio 1 Sessions (Big Country album), 1994
- The Radio One Sessions (Cowboy Junkies album), 2002
- The Radio One Sessions (The Damned album), 1996
- The Radio One Sessions (Elastica album), 2001
- Radio 1 Sessions (Generation X album)
- Radio 1 Sessions (Inspiral Carpets album), 1996
- The Radio One Sessions (Stiff Little Fingers album)

== BBC Recordings ==
- The BBC Recordings (Budgie album)
- The BBC Recordings (The Sound album)
- Radiation (BBC Recordings 84–86), by Cabaret Voltaire

== Other BBC recordings ==
- BBC Radio 1 Live in Concert, a series of albums by Windsong
- BBC Live & In-Session, a 2005 Motörhead album
- BBC Archives (album), a 2002 Iron Maiden album
- BBC in Session, The La's album
- BBC Live, a 2005 Violent Femmes album
- BBC Radio Sessions, an album by The Bluetones
- Government Commissions: BBC Sessions 1996–2003, a Mogwai album
- Radio One (album), a 1988 Jimi Hendrix Experience album
- Something's Coming: The BBC Recordings 1969–1970, a 1997 Yes (band) album
- Deep Purple in Concert a 1980 Deep Purple album
- On Air (Rolling Stones album), 2017
- On Air (Queen album), 2016
