= An Ecstasy of Fumbling – The Definitive Anthology =

Compilation album by Budgie

Compilation album by Budgie
- Released: 1996
- Recorded: 1971–1988
- Genre: Hard rock, heavy metal
- Length: 156:09
- Label: Repertoire

Budgie chronology
Best of Budgie (1981)	An Ecstasy of Fumbling – The Definitive Anthology (1996)	Best of Budgie (1997)

Professional ratings
Review scores
Source	Rating
Allmusic	4/5 stars

An Ecstasy of Fumbling – The Definitive Anthology was the third compilation album by Welsh rock band Budgie. The album contained two discs and featured songs from their first album, Budgie, to their tenth, Deliver Us from Evil. The album also features one rare track, "Beautiful Lies", that has never featured on any other Budgie album, as well as two live tracks.

The title of the album is taken from the Wilfred Owen poem, "Dulce et Decorum est."

== Track listing ==
Disc one
No.	Title	Length
1.	"Homicidal Suicidal"	6:44
2.	"Nude Disintegrating Parachutist Woman" (single version)	4:09
3.	"Whiskey River"	3:21
4.	"Hot as a Docker's Armpit"	5:52
5.	"In the Grip of a Tyrefitter's Hand"	6:24
6.	"Breadfan"	6:06
7.	"Parents"	10:21
8.	"In for the Kill"	6:26
9.	"Crash Course in Brain Surgery"	2:37
10.	"Napoleon Bona-Part One & Two"	7:16
11.	"Who Do You Want for Your Love?"	6:09
12.	"Breaking All the House Rules"	7:24
13.	"Beautiful Lies" (previously unreleased)	5:01

Disc two
No.	Title	Length
1.	"Anne Neggen"	4:08
2.	"If I Were Britannia I'd Waive the Rules"	5:51
3.	"Black Velvet Stallion"	8:07
4.	"Melt the Ice Away"	3:29
5.	"Forearm Smash"	5:40
6.	"Time to Remember"	5:28
7.	"Wild Fire"	5:13
8.	"Lies of Jim (The E-Type Lover)"	4:47
9.	"I Turned to Stone"	6:10
10.	"She Used Me Up"	3:18
11.	"Superstar"	3:29
12.	"Don't Cry"	3:19
13.	"Truth Drug"	4:24
14.	"Hold On to Love"	4:19
15.	"Superstar" (Live)	4:09
16.	"Panzer Division Destroyed" (Live)	6:18

== Personnel ==
Budgie

- Burke Shelley - bass, vocals (all tracks)
- Tony Bourge - guitar (tracks 1–16)
- John Thomas - guitar (tracks 17–24)
- Ray Phillips - drums (tracks 1–7)
- Pete Boot - drums (tracks 8 & 9)
- Steve Williams - drums (tracks 10–24)
