= Radio Sessions =

Radio Sessions may refer to:

- Radio Sessions (Curve album)
- Radio Sessions, album by Alternative TV
- Radio Sessions: 1971-1973, Stackridge (2012)
- Radio Sessions 1974 & 1978, Budgie
- Radio Sessions '83–'84, compilation album by British rock band New Model Army 1988
- Radio Sessions 1969-1972, album by Stone the Crows (2009)
- Radio Sessions 69 to 71, album by Blodwyn Pig and Mick Abrahams
- Radio Sessions, album by Tarwater (2011)

== See also ==
- Live at the BBC (disambiguation)
- BBC Radio Sessions
