= Garage Inc. =

1998 part-studio, part-compilation by Metallica

Studio album / compilation album by Metallica
- Released: November 24, 1998
- Recorded: Disc 1: December 18, 1997, and September–October 1998; Disc 2: 1984–1995
- Studio: Disc 1: The Plant (Sausalito, California); Disc 2: Various
- Genre: Heavy metal
- Length: 136:38
- Label: Elektra
- Producers: Bob Rock; James Hetfield; Lars Ulrich; Metallica; Mark Whitaker

Metallica chronology
Reload (1997)	Garage Inc. (1998)	S&M (1999)

Singles from Garage Inc.
- 1. "Turn the Page" Released: November 16, 1998; 2. "Whiskey in the Jar" Released: February 1, 1999; 3. "Die, Die My Darling" Released: June 7, 1999

Garage Inc. is a part-studio, part-compilation album by the American heavy metal band Metallica, composed entirely of cover songs. Released as a double album on November 24, 1998, the first disc features new studio recordings, while the second includes previously released covers, such as B-sides and the entire Garage Days Re-Revisited EP (1987). Some of the material had been heavily bootlegged since their original releases, so the band decided to compile them in one package for accessibility. Sessions for the new covers took place over three weeks from September to October 1998 with producer Bob Rock.

Disc one features songs by artists that have influenced Metallica, including bands from the 1970s, such as Black Sabbath and Blue Öyster Cult; the new wave of British heavy metal, such as Diamond Head and Sweet Savage; and hardcore punk acts, such as Discharge. The project was named after the song "Damage, Inc.", from Master of Puppets (1986), while the cover artwork depicts the band as greasy mechanics.

The album was supported by three singles: covers of Bob Seger's "Turn the Page", Thin Lizzy's "Whiskey in the Jar", and Misfits' "Die, Die My Darling"; the first two featured music videos. Metallica promoted the album on a short five-show club tour in November 1998, with a Metallica tribute act as the opener. The album received positive reviews from critics. Several believed the band made the covers stand on their own through their own style, while others criticized the song choices as too obscure.

== Background and production ==
The day after Metallica finished the Poor Re-Touring Me Tour in San Diego, California, they hit the studio to start recording a new album of cover versions. As the band's drummer, Lars Ulrich, explained, the band wanted to do something different after "three pretty serious albums in a row" – Metallica (1991), Load (1996), and Reload (1997) – and the process would be easier by working with covers, especially as the band had a tradition of taking other people's songs and "[turning] them into something very Metallica, different from what the original artist did". The band had recorded many covers since their 1981 formation that were spread across various releases, such as B-sides of their singles and the 1987 EP The $5.98 E.P. – Garage Days Re-Revisited. Some of these covers, including Diamond Head's "Am I Evil?" and the Anti-Nowhere League's "So What", had become live favorites. Conceived in part to combat bootlegs of the previously released material, the project would "put [all of the covers] in a nice little packaging for easy listening" along with the newly recorded cover versions, chosen through a group decision. Ulrich said:

The whole idea about the project, if you generalize, is that because of the nature of our [songwriting process] [...] What we need all the time and have throughout our career is a project like this to balance the sort of silly ways that we record our own material."

Garage Inc. would be the first time many fans gained access to the previously released material. Potential album titles included In Garage We Trust, Garage Up Your Ass, Dark Side of the Garage, Use Your Garage I & II, and Gives Good Garage. Ultimately, they named the album after their song "Damage, Inc.", from Master of Puppets (1986). According to the author Mick Wall, the project was an attempt to gain back credibility within the metal community following the band's mid-1990s "reinvention", while also "retaining the extra dimension of the band's image Lars and Kirk had worked so hard to stimulate".

The new recordings were taped over three weeks during sessions at The Plant Studios in Sausalito, California, from September to October 1998. Bob Rock returned from Metallica, Load, and Reload as producer, with assistance from Hetfield and Ulrich. Only one of the eleven songs on disc one was not done during these sessions, which was a version of Lynyrd Skynyrd's "Tuesday's Gone" the band recorded for a radio broadcast at KSJO Studios in San Jose, California on December 17, 1997. The recording featured an array of guest appearances, including Jerry Cantrell and Sean Kinney (guitarist and drummer of Alice in Chains), Les Claypool (bassist of Primus), Pepper Keenan (guitarist and vocalist of Corrosion of Conformity), Jim Martin (former guitarist of Faith No More), John Popper (frontman of Blues Traveler), and Gary Rossington (guitarist and founder of Lynyrd Skynyrd).

The band debuted two new covers during a show at the Playboy Mansion in Los Angeles on October 18, unveiling the Misfits' "Die, Die My Darling" and Bob Seger's "Turn the Page".

== Songs ==
=== Disc one ===
According to Wall, the song choices on disc one "reflect the desire to keep faith with the past while retaining [Metallica's] newly á la mode edge". Ulrich said, "We like to turn [the songs] into something very Metallica, different from how the original artist did them." Several tracks are an homage to artists from the new wave of British heavy metal, such as Diamond Head and Sweet Savage. Ulrich was an avid fan of Diamond Head. After hearing "It's Electric", he later admitted: "If there was ever a song that made me want to be in a band, that was it. I wasn't in a band at the time [...]. That song was like, 'Holy hell, if I could just play that song or be in some sort of setup where I could live my life playing a song like that, that's what I want to do." Lead singer James Hetfield was also a fan, saying that Diamond Head's songs "kind of took you on journeys". A medley of Mercyful Fate songs, consisting of "Satan's Fall", "Curse of the Pharaohs", "A Corpse Without Soul", "Into the Coven", and "Evil", and titled "Mercyful Fate", acknowledges the impact of the 1980s hardcore metal scene. Metallica and Mercyful Fate grew close during the recording of the former's Master of Puppets. The influence of modern 1990s artists is heard through a cover of "Loverman" by Nick Cave and the Bad Seeds, who had influenced Hetfield during the writing of Load and Reload.

Garage Inc. features five songs by 1970s bands that influenced Metallica: Black Sabbath's "Sabbra Cadabra", Blue Öyster Cult's "Astronomy", Thin Lizzy's 1973 rendition of "Whiskey in the Jar", and Bob Seger's "Turn the Page". The band chose "Sabbra Cadabra" for its main riff, which Ulrich described as "the fucking riff from hell". The band had played the song live while on tour with original Black Sabbath singer Ozzy Osbourne in 1986. Bassist Jason Newsted recalled feeling pressure living up to Black Sabbath bassist Geezer Butler, saying that "I tried the hardest to pay the most attention to be ultra respectful on". After recording "Astronomy", the band sent a cassette tape of the track to Blue Öyster Cult's bassist Joe Bouchard, who loved their rendition. Hetfield first heard "Turn the Page" during the sessions for Load, later admitting that he was not a fan of Seger but appreciated his music. He wanted to cover the song for Garage Inc. because he said it "sums up the whole road experience really, really well". Lead guitarist Kirk Hammett recreated the original song's saxophone part with a bottleneck slide guitar. He later said, "It pushed me to go other places with the slide that I didn't think I could pull off."

The band's original bassist Cliff Burton's influence is acknowledged with the presence of Lynyrd Skynyrd's "Tuesday's Gone", the first record Hetfield ever bought, and Misfits' "Die, Die My Darling". Burton had also introduced the other band members to Discharge and Thin Lizzy, leading Metallica to cover the former's "Free Speech for the Dumb" and "The More I See", and the latter's 1973 rendition of "Whiskey in the Jar". Ulrich admired Discharge's "frenzied, anarchistic, and politically committed tracks" on their first album Hear Nothing See Nothing Say Nothing (1982). For "Whiskey in the Jar", the band attempted the track multiple ways before settling on playing it like the punk rock band Social Distortion, who Hetfield was a fan of. For his guitar parts, Hammett paid tribute to Thin Lizzy's original guitarist Brian Robertson, who was one of his primary influences.

Other songs the band considered but rejected for the project included covers of Iron Maiden's "Prowler", Diamond Head's "Streets of Gold", Sweet Savage's "Eye of the Storm", Jaguar's "Backstreet Woman", and Witchfynde's "Leaving Nadir". They also considered other Misfits songs such as "Ghouls Nights Out", "Astro Zombies", and "London Dungeon", but settled on "Die, Die My Darling" as it fit Metallica's style better. Newsted was disappointed they did not cover Bill Withers's "Who Is He (And What Is He to You)?", or songs by Tom Waits, particularly "16 Shells From a Thirty-Ought-Six".

=== Disc two ===
The second disc features 16 previously released covers separated by their original releases. Most of these songs are metal or punk-oriented. The first of these is The $5.98 E.P. – Garage Days Re-Revisited, which features covers of Diamond Head's "Helpless", Holocaust's "The Small Hours", Killing Joke's "The Wait", Budgie's "Crash Course in Brain Surgery", and Misfits' "Last Caress"/"Green Hell". The second set is the two covers of Diamond Head's "Am I Evil?" and Blitzkrieg's "Blitzkrieg", both originally released as the B-sides for the "Creeping Death" maxi-single in 1984.

The third set is subtitled B-sides and one-offs (1988–1993), which features the "Harvester of Sorrow" B-sides (Budgie's "Breadfan" and Diamond Head's "The Prince"), and covers of Queen's "Stone Cold Crazy" (originally appearing on the Rubáiyát: Elektra's 40th Anniversary compilation in 1990), Anti-Nowhere League's "So What" (a B-side of "The Unforgiven" maxi-single in 1991 (Note: "So What" also appeared as a hidden track on the Japanese edition of Metallica, playing after that album's final song "The Struggle Within".)), and Sweet Savage's "Killing Time" (a B-side of "The Unforgiven" in 1991). The fourth and final set, subtitled Motörheadache, consists of the four Motörhead covers Metallica performed at its lead singer Lemmy's 50th birthday party in 1995. These are "Overkill", "Damage Case", "Stone Dead Forever", and "Too Late Too Late". They had first appeared on the "Hero of the Day" limited edition CD single in 1996.

== Packaging ==
The cover for Garage Inc. features an Anton Corbijn photograph of Metallica dressed as greasy mechanics. The cover art also reinstates the band's original logo, after the band had used a modernized design for Load and Reload. The accompanying 32-page CD booklet, designed by Andie Airfix, contained detailed explanations over the song choices, reproductions of the original artworks for the Garage Days EP and "Creeping Death" 12" single sleeve, and chronological photographs and memorabilia dating back to the band's early days.

== Release and promotion ==
Cover songs are a part of our history, and fans know that. We have just put them all in a nice little package for easy listening. We don't sit and analyze things on a sales level. Covers probably won't have the same commercial appeal as 'Nothing Else Matters', but there are people who'll get off on hearing what we do to a Thin Lizzy track.

— Lars Ulrich, Billboard, 1998

Garage Inc. was released on November 24, 1998, through Elektra Records. In the U.S., the compilation sold 426,500 units in the first week of release, making Metallica's fourth straight debut surpassing 400,000 copies. The album peaked at number two on the U.S. Billboard 200, kept off the top spot by Garth Brooks' Double Live. In 2000, it was certified 5x platinum by the Recording Industry Association of America (RIAA).

Three singles were released from the project: "Turn the Page" on November 16, 1998; "Whiskey in the Jar" on February 1, 1999; and "Die, Die My Darling" on June 7 the same year. On the Mainstream Rock Airplay chart, "Turn the Page" reached number 1, "Whiskey in the Jar" reached number 4, and "Die, Die My Darling" reached number 26. The band filmed a music video for "Turn the Page", which depicts a single mother, played by the pornographic actress Ginger Lynn, supporting her child through prostitution while living in motels. Another video was made for "Whiskey in the Jar", which is set in a lesbian sorority house. Both videos were directed by Jonas Åkerlund. At the 42nd Annual Grammy Awards in 2000, "Whiskey in the Jar" won the Grammy Award for Best Hard Rock Performance.

To support the album's release, Metallica played five shows between November 17 and 24, 1998, performing in small-scale clubs in Ontario, Canada; Chicago, Illinois; Detroit, Michigan; Philadelphia, Pennsylvania; and New York City. Embracing the project's concept, the band's setlist consisted entirely of cover songs from throughout their career. Metallica's own music was presented by the opening act, Battery, a Metallica tribute band. Battery was received well by audiences, with band member Laurence Langley recalling, "There was an unbelievable feeling of acceptance right away."

== Reception ==
Professional ratings
Review scores
Source	Rating
AllMusic	4/5 stars
The Baltimore Sun	3/4 stars
Collector's Guide to Heavy Metal	8/10
The Encyclopedia of Popular Music	3/5 stars
Entertainment Weekly	B−
Los Angeles Times	3/4 stars
Q	3/5 stars
Rolling Stone	4/5 stars
The Rolling Stone Album Guide	4.5/5 stars
San Francisco Chronicle	4/5 stars

Garage Inc. received positive reviews from music critics. The San Francisco Chronicle's Gary Graff and AllMusic's Stephen Thomas Erlewine praised the band's performances, believing they made the covers stand on their own through their own style. Erlewine felt Garage Inc. was superior to Load and Reload, writing that it affirms Metallica as the best metal band of the 1980s and 1990s. In the Los Angeles Times, Sandy Masuo said: "The most striking tracks not only shed light on Metallica, but also put an illuminating spin on the [original] artists." Tom Sinclair of Entertainment Weekly and The Baltimore Sun's J.D. Constantine praised the album as "an intermittently exhilarating joyride" and "terrific fun", respectively. Rolling Stone's Ben Ratliff said, "Gloriously hard as the album is, you can't miss Metallica's good-natured side coming through." A writer for CMJ wrote: "Those who still relate to the adolescent angst of [Metallica's] earliest days will find plenty to like on Garage Inc." Amongst mixed reviews, Sinclair and Caroline Sullivan of The Guardian criticized some of the song choices as too obscure for fans to recognize the original artists and too similar to Metallica's own sound.

Metallica's biographers have given the album positive assessments. Mick Wall said that the entire project "crackled with energy, providing a fine counterpoint to the airlessly manicured sound of Load and Reload, as though Metallica had discovered its inner animal." In his book Metallica: The Music and the Mayhem (2010), Malcolm Dome said the band sounded "fresh and invigorating", selecting the singles "Turn the Page" and "Whiskey in the Jar" as highlights. Paul Stenning, in Metallica: All That Matters (2010), believed that the band heavily improved on some of the original versions with their covers, offering superior dynamics and punch on tracks like "Sabbra Cadabra" and "Die, Die My Darling". Overall, Stenning wrote that Garage Inc. "served as a timely reminder of the band's comfort zone – showing they'd always be able to draw upon richly varied musical history and proving that Metallica were not too proud to display their roots, paying homage to musical masters."

The album introduced Diamond Head to a larger audience; guitarist Brian Tatler later said royalties from it changed his life. Mercyful Fate also enjoyed renewed interest following the medley on Garage Inc.

In 2005, Garage Inc. was ranked number 500 in Rock Hard magazine's book of The 500 Greatest Rock & Metal Albums of All Time. In 2023, Radio X included Garage Inc. in their list of the best covers album ever. Three years later, Metal Hammer's Chris Chantler called it the greatest metal covers album.

== Track listing ==
=== Disc one ===
New Recordings: '98
No.	Title	Writer(s)	Original artist (date)	Length
1.	"Free Speech for the Dumb"	Garry Maloney; Kevin "Cal" Morris; Tony "Bones" Roberts; Roy "Rainy" Wainwright	Discharge (1982)	2:36
2.	"It's Electric"	Sean Harris; Brian Tatler	Diamond Head (1980)	3:34
3.	"Sabbra Cadabra"	Ozzy Osbourne; Tony Iommi; Geezer Butler; Bill Ward	Black Sabbath (1973)	6:20
4.	"Turn the Page"	Bob Seger	Bob Seger (1973)	6:06
5.	"Die, Die My Darling"	Glenn Danzig	Misfits (1984)	2:29
6.	"Loverman"	Nick Cave	Nick Cave and the Bad Seeds (1994)	7:53
7.	"Mercyful Fate" (medley) "Satan's Fall" (0:43) "Curse of the Pharaohs" (3:05) "A Corpse Without Soul" (1:38) "Into the Coven" (1:49) "Evil" (3:56)	King Diamond; Hank Shermann	Mercyful Fate (1982, 1983)	11:11
8.	"Astronomy"	Joe Bouchard; Albert Bouchard; Sandy Pearlman	Blue Öyster Cult (1974)	6:37
9.	"Whiskey in the Jar"	Traditional arr.: Eric Bell; Brian Downey; Phil Lynott	Traditional (inspired by Thin Lizzy's 1972 version)	5:05
10.	"Tuesday's Gone"	Allen Collins; Ronnie Van Zant	Lynyrd Skynyrd (1973)	9:06
11.	"The More I See"	Maloney; Morris; Peter "Pooch" Purtill; Wainwright	Discharge (1984)	4:49
Total length:				65:42

=== Disc two ===
The $5.98 E.P. – Garage Days Re-Revisited (1987)
No.	Title	Writer(s)	Original artist	Length
1.	"Helpless"	Harris; Tatler	Diamond Head (1980)	6:38
2.	"The Small Hours"	John Mortimer; John McCullim; Bryan Bartley; Ron Levine	Holocaust (1983)	6:43
3.	"The Wait"	Jaz Coleman; Kevin "Geordie" Walker; Martin "Youth" Glover; Paul Ferguson	Killing Joke (1980)	4:55
4.	"Crash Course in Brain Surgery"	Burke Shelley; Tony Bourge; Ray Phillips	Budgie (1974)	3:10
5.	"Last Caress"/"Green Hell"	Glenn Danzig	Misfits (1980/1983)	3:30

"Creeping Death" B-sides (1984)
No.	Title	Writer(s)	Original artist	Length
6.	"Am I Evil?"	Harris; Tatler	Diamond Head (1980)	7:50
7.	"Blitzkrieg"	Ian Jones; Jim Sirotto; Brian Ross	Blitzkrieg (1981)	3:37

B-sides and one-offs (1988–1993)
No.	Title	Writer(s)	Original artist	Length
8.	"Breadfan"	Bourge; Phillips; Shelley	Budgie (1973)	5:41
9.	"The Prince"	Harris; Tatler	Diamond Head (1980)	4:26
10.	"Stone Cold Crazy"	Freddie Mercury; Brian May; Roger Taylor; John Deacon	Queen (1974)	2:19
11.	"So What"	Nick "Animal" Kulmer; Chris "Magoo" Exall; Clive "Winston" Blake	Anti-Nowhere League (1981)	3:09
12.	"Killing Time"	Vivian Campbell; Trevor Fleming; Raymond Haller; Davy Bates	Sweet Savage (1981)	3:04

Motörheadache ("Hero of the Day" limited edition CD single B-sides) (1996)
No.	Title	Writer(s)	Original artist	Length
13.	"Overkill"	Eddie Clarke; Ian "Lemmy" Kilmister; Phil "Philthy Animal" Taylor	Motörhead (1979)	4:05
14.	"Damage Case"	Clarke; Kilmister; Taylor; Mick Farren	Motörhead (1979)	3:40
15.	"Stone Dead Forever"	Clarke; Kilmister; Taylor	Motörhead (1979)	4:52
16.	"Too Late Too Late"	Clarke; Kilmister; Taylor	Motörhead (1979)	3:12
Total length:				70:51

== Personnel ==
According to Metallica's website, except where noted:

Metallica

- James Hetfield – guitars, vocals
- Lars Ulrich – drums, backing vocals on "Die, Die My Darling"
- Kirk Hammett – guitars, backing vocals on "Die, Die My Darling"
- Jason Newsted – bass, backing vocals on "Die, Die My Darling"
- Cliff Burton – bass on "Am I Evil?" and "Blitzkrieg"

Guest musicians on "Tuesday's Gone"

- Pepper Keenan – co-lead vocals
- Jerry Cantrell – guitar
- Sean Kinney – additional percussion
- Jim Martin – guitar
- John Popper – harmonica
- Gary Rossington – additional guitar
- Les Claypool – banjo

Technical personnel

Disc I

- Bob Rock, James Hetfield, Lars Ulrich – production
- Randy Staub – engineering
- Brian Dobbs – additional engineering
- Kent Matcke, Leff Lefferts, Chris Manning – assistant engineers
- Paul DeCarli, Mike Gillies – digital editing
- Randy Staub, Mike Fraser – mixing
- George Marino – mastering

Disc II

- Tracks 1–5:
  - "Not very produced" by Metallica (Hetfield, Ulrich, Hammett, Newsted)
  - Csaba "The Hut" Petocz – engineering
- Tracks 6–7:
  - Metallica (Hetfield, Ulrich, Burton, Hammett), Mark Whitaker – production
  - Jeffrey "Nick" Norman – engineering
- Tracks 8–9
  - Not produced
  - Mike Clink, Toby "Rage" Wright – engineering
  - Flemming Rasmussen – rough mixing
- Track 10
  - "Kind of produced" by Metallica (Hetfield, Ulrich, Hammett, Newsted)
  - Toby "Rage" Wright – engineering
- Tracks 11–12
  - "Roughly produced" by Bob Rock with Hetfield & Ulrich
  - Randy Staub – engineering
- Tracks 13–16
  - Not produced
  - Randy Staub – mixing
  - George Marino – remastering
- Andie Airfix – album design
- Anton Corbijn – front cover photography, additional photography
- Ross Halfin – back cover photography, additional photography
- Mark Leialoha – additional photography
- David Fricke – liner notes

== Charts ==
=== Weekly charts ===
Weekly chart performance for Garage Inc.
Chart (1998–99)	Peak position
Australian Albums (ARIA)	2
Austrian Albums (Ö3 Austria)	3
Belgian Albums (Ultratop Flanders)	9
Belgian Albums (Ultratop Wallonia)	31
Canadian Albums (Billboard)	3
Danish Albums (Hitlisten)	21
Dutch Albums (Album Top 100)	8
European Albums (European Top 100 Albums)	4
Finnish Albums (Suomen virallinen lista)	1
French Albums (SNEP)	9
German Albums (Offizielle Top 100)	1
Hungarian Albums (MAHASZ)	19
Italian Albums (Musica e Dischi)	22
Mexican Albums (Top 100 Mexico)	97
New Zealand Albums (RMNZ)	3
Norwegian Albums (VG-lista)	1
Portuguese Albums (AFP)	4
Scottish Albums (Official Charts)	37
Spanish Albums (PROMUSICAE)	11
Swedish Albums (Sverigetopplistan)	10
Swiss Albums (Schweizer Hitparade)	1
UK Albums (OCC)	29
US Billboard 200	2

=== Year-end charts ===
1998 year-end chart performance for Garage Inc.
Chart (1998)	Position
Australian Albums (ARIA)	36
Belgian Albums (Ultratop Flanders)	73
Swedish Albums (Sverigetopplistan)	59

1999 year-end chart performance for Garage Inc.
Chart (1999)	Position
Austrian Albums (Ö3 Austria)	33
Belgian Albums (Ultratop Flanders)	74
Canadian Albums (RPM)	77
Dutch Albums (MegaCharts)	68
German Albums Chart	21
US Billboard 200	27

=== Sales and certifications ===
Certifications and sales for Garage Inc.
Region	Certification	Certified units/sales
Argentina (CAPIF)	Gold	30,000^{^}
Australia (ARIA)	3× Platinum	210,000^{‡}
Austria (IFPI Austria)	Gold	25,000^{*}
Denmark (IFPI Danmark)	2× Platinum	40,000^{‡}
Finland (Musiikkituottajat)	Gold	27,446
Germany (BVMI)	Platinum	500,000^{‡}
Greece (IFPI Greece)	Platinum	30,000^{^}
New Zealand (RMNZ)	Platinum	15,000^{^}
Norway (IFPI Norway)	Gold	25,000^{*}
Poland (ZPAV)	Platinum	100,000^{*}
Spain (Promusicae)	Gold	50,000^{^}
Sweden (GLF)	Platinum	80,000^{^}
Switzerland (IFPI Switzerland)	Gold	25,000^{^}
Turkey (Mü-Yap)	Gold	5,000^{*}
United Kingdom (BPI)	Gold	100,000^{^}
United States (RIAA)	5× Platinum	3,350,000
Summaries
Europe (IFPI)	Platinum	1,000,000^{*}
^{*} Sales figures based on certification alone.^{^} Shipments figures based on certification alone.^{‡} Sales+streaming figures based on certification alone.
