= The Last Stage (album) =

Compilation album by Budgie
- Released: 25 October 2004
- Recorded: Rockfield Studios and Woodside Studios, Monmouth, UK, 1979–1985
- Genre: Heavy metal
- Length: 61:32
- Label: Noteworthy
- Producer: Budgie

Budgie chronology
Life in San Antonio (2002)	The Last Stage (2004)	You're All Living in Cuckooland (2006)

Professional ratings
Review scores
Source	Rating
Allmusic	(unfavorable)
Classic Rock	2/5 stars

The Last Stage is a compilation of unreleased Budgie tracks, mostly from the early-to-mid eighties. Many of these tracks were intended to be released on the follow-up to 1982's Deliver Us from Evil, an album that never saw the light of day. The track "Beautiful Lies" was supposedly meant to be included on the album but never made it. It was previously made available on the Budgie compilation album An Ecstasy of Fumbling – The Definitive Anthology.

The sound quality varies from track to track, as each song was at a different level of completion before it was scrapped.

== Track listing ==
No.	Title	Length
1.	"Love Is When You Love"	3:25
2.	"House of a Sinner"	4:00
3.	"Same Old Sad Affair"	3:26
4.	"Signed Your Own Fate"	3:51
5.	"Hard Luck"	3:44
6.	"Living with Another Man"	3:25
7.	"You Ain't Got Love"	3:14
8.	"Renegade"	3:48
9.	"Sweet Fast Talker"	4:25
10.	"Wait till Tomorrow"	4:14
11.	"Rock Your Blood"	3:55
12.	"Nutbush City Limits" (Ike & Tina Turner cover)	3:17
13.	"Can't Get Up in the Morning"	4:29
14.	"Heaven in Your Eyes"	3:14
15.	"Picture on a Screen"	5:19
16.	"Victim"	3:46

== Personnel ==
=== Band members ===
- Burke Shelley - vocals and bass
- John Thomas - guitar
- Steve Williams - drums

=== Additional musicians ===
- Rob Kendrick - guitar and vocals on track 13

=== Production ===
- Dave Charles, Simon Dawson, Pat Moran - engineers
- Mike Brown, Robert M. Corich - remastering engineers
