= Power Supply (album) =

Studio album by Budgie
- Released: 10 October 1980
- Recorded: 1980
- Studios: The Old Mill, Rockfield, Wales
- Genre: Heavy metal
- Length: 37:18
- Labels: RCA, Active
- Producers: Budgie & Dave Charles

Budgie chronology
| Impeckable (1978) | Power Supply (1980) | Nightflight (1981) |

Professional ratings
Review scores
| Source | Rating |
|---|---|
| Allmusic | 2/5 stars |

Power Supply is the eighth album by the Welsh heavy metal power trio, Budgie, released in October 1980 on Active Records, a sublabel of RCA Records (which was the distributor of A&M Records — Budgie's previous label — at the time). This is the first album without original guitarist Tony Bourge, who left the band in 1978 after the album Impeckable. Power Supply showcases a more straight forward blues-influenced raw heavy metal sound that dispenses entirely with the experimental approach of the previous two albums, an approach that matched the zeitgeist of the time, reflecting the renewed and revitalised surge of interest in classic heavy metal brought about by the younger NWOBHM bands.

New guitarist John Thomas, from the Southern rock outfit the George Hatcher Band, ventured away from the sometime progressive rock, psychedelic minor chord focused inclinations of the previous guitarist, Tony Bourge, to replace it with a more direct heavy metal blues rock rhythm and blues sound that took the band in new directions with this and subsequent albums, which appealed to the older fans of the band as well as attracting new audiences.

Dave Charles, who had previously worked with Dr. Feelgood (Down by the Jetty), Dave Edmunds and Brinsley Schwarz, was the sound engineer on the album, recording the band at Rockfield Studios. Science fiction fantasy artist and book-cover illustrator Adrian Chesterman provided the futuristic artwork for the sleeve design.

== Track listing ==
All tracks are written by Burke Shelley and John Thomas, except where noted.

Side one
| No. | Title | Writer(s) | Length |
|---|---|---|---|
| 1. | "Forearm Smash" | | 5:40 |
| 2. | "Hellbender" | Shelley, Thomas, Steve Williams | 3:25 |
| 3. | "Heavy Revolution" | | 4:28 |
| 4. | "Gunslinger" | | 5:03 |

Side two
| No. | Title | Length |
|---|---|---|
| 5. | "Power Supply" | 3:41 |
| 6. | "Secrets in My Head" | 3:58 |
| 7. | "Time to Remember" | 5:27 |
| 8. | "Crime Against the World" | 5:36 |

1993 CD reissue bonus tracks
| No. | Title | Writer(s) | Length |
|---|---|---|---|
| 9. | "Wild Fire" | Shelley, Williams, Thomas | 5:13 |
| 10. | "High School Girls" | Shelley | 3:39 |
| 11. | "Panzer Division Destroyed" | | 5:55 |
| 12. | "Lies of Jim (The E-Type Lover)" | Shelley | 4:45 |

- These tracks were originally released as the If Swallowed Do Not Induce Vomiting EP.

2012 remaster bonus tracks
| No. | Title | Length |
|---|---|---|
| 9. | "Crime Against the World" (single edit) | 3:27 |
| 10. | "Gunslinger" (live, 1981) | 4:55 |
| 11. | "Crime Against the World" (live, 1981) | 4:52 |

== Personnel ==
Band members

- Burke Shelley – vocals, bass
- John Thomas – guitar, slide guitar
- Steve Williams – drums

Production

- Dave Charles – producer, engineer
- Neil Jones – light & sound design
- Tommy John – light & sound design
- Eric Olthwaite – light & sound design
- Adrian Chesterman – Illustration
