= Power supply (disambiguation) =

A power supply is an electronic device that supplies electric energy to an electrical load.

Power supply may also refer to:

- Power supply unit (computer) a computer component
- Electricity delivery to households and industry via electric power generation and distribution networks
- Power Supply (album), a 1980 album of Budgie
- Power Supply (EP), a 2006 album of Anamanaguchi
