= The Evidence (band) =

Former punk rock band from Calgary, Alberta

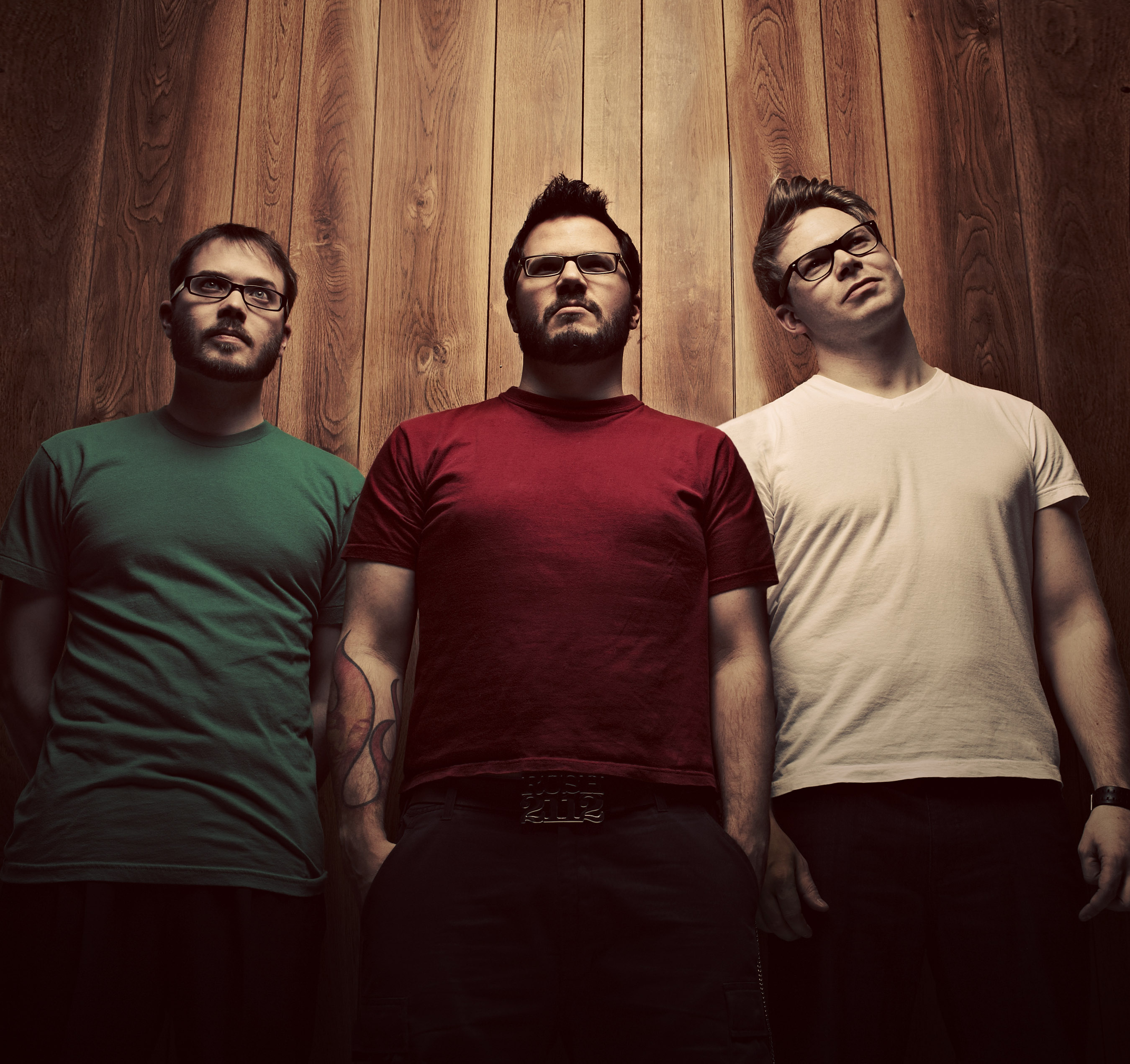
- The Evidence photographed by Carla Fedje

Background information
- Also known as: The Failure
- Origin: Calgary, Alberta, Canada
- Genres: Alternative
- Years active: 2002-2016
- Labels: Meter Records
- Members: Dean Rud; Tyler Pickering; Casey Lewis
- Past members: Randy Burton, John Gerrard, Colin Hess
- Website: theevidence.net

The Evidence was a Canadian rock band from Calgary, Alberta whose sound was described as "precision-punk", "progressive-post-punk", and "gentleman's metal". The band was a power trio consisting of members Dean Rud (bass, vocals), Tyler Pickering (guitar, vocals), and Casey Lewis (drums, vocals). It released three albums, and three music videos.

== History ==
After playing in various local bands in the 1990s, the three members came together in 2002 to form a band they called The Failure. Although the band was successful, selling through pressings of their first two albums and placing videos in rotation on both MuchMusic and MTV Canada, the name wasn't appealing or workable and, in 2007, it was changed to The Evidence.

Lewis is also a producer and engineer and, in 2000, founded Calgary's Echo Base Studios. Lewis recorded, mixed and mastered all of The Evidence's albums and has a long list of credits. Rud had founded Meter Records in 1998, and his label released their albums.

In 2009, The Evidence released its first album, Polarity.

In 2010, the band was the recipient of CFEX's Xposure award which netted the band with $25,000 in tour funding and placed them in rotation in the broadcaster's playlist for the summer. In 2011, it joined the bands This is a Standoff and Carpenter on a multi-show European tour.

In 2011, The Evidence released Currents, along with two videos--for "Damn That River" and "Crossing the Rubicon". The band played the 2011 Warped Tour solely because they were voted in by their adoring public. They would appear at the tour in 2012 as well.

The band released its third album, Potential, in 2013. It also released a video for its single "Lies".

On December 23, 2016, The Evidence played its farewell concert at Dickens Pub in Calgary.

== Discography ==
Studio albums

| Year | Album | Label | Chart peaks | |
| Year | Album | Label | US | US Indie |
|---|---|---|---|---|
| 2009 | Polarity | Meter Records | — | — |
| 2011 | Currents | Meter Records | — | — |
| 2013 | Potential | Meter Records | — | — |
"—" denotes a release that did not chart

== Videography ==
- "Damn That River" (2011)
- "Crossing The Rubicon" (2011)
- "Lies" (2013)

== See also ==
- Music of Canada
- Canadian rock
- List of bands from Canada
- List of Power Trios
