= List of power trios =

This is a list of rock groups described as power trios – bands consisting of electric guitar, bass, and drums.

The prototypical power trio is the British band Cream, founded in 1966 with Eric Clapton on guitar/vocals, Jack Bruce on bass/vocals, and Ginger Baker on drums.

== A ==
- Adrian Belew Power Trio
- Agent Orange
- Alkaline Trio
- American Authors (Quartet from 2006 to 2021, trio since 2021)
- Arcane Roots
- Arcwelder
- The Aristocrats
- Ash
- The Atomic Bitchwax
- Autolux

== B ==
- Babes in Toyland
- Back Door Slam
- Band of Skulls
- Bang
- Beck, Bogert & Appice
- Biffy Clyro
- The Big Three
- Black Midi (2020–2024)
- Black Rebel Motorcycle Club
- Blink-182
- Blue Cheer
- Blue Murder
- Boris (except for occasional fourth member Michio Kurihara on guitar)
- Bowling for Soup (upon the departure of Chris Burney in 2025)
- Bratmobile
- Brutus
- Budgie
- Buffalo Tom

== C ==
- California Breed
- Ché
- Chevelle
- Clear Blue Sky
- Cloakroom
- Coroner
- Cosmic Psychos
- Cream
- The Cribs (except when Johnny Marr was a member)

== D ==
- Dada
- Danko Jones
- Death
- Die! Die! Die!
- Dinosaur Jr.
- Divididos
- Doctor Victor
- Dust
- Dying Fetus

== E ==
- Earthless
- Earl Greyhound
- Elliott Brood
- Everclear
- The Evidence

== F ==
- Failure
- The Fall of Troy
- Feeder
- Firehose
- The Fratellis
- Freak Kitchen
- Fudge Tunnel
- Fun Lovin' Criminals

== G ==
- Galaxie 500
- Glass Harp
- Gnome
- Godflesh
- Grand Funk Railroad
- Grand Magus
- Grant Lee Buffalo
- Green Day
- Guitar Wolf

== H ==
- Heroes & Zeros
- High on Fire
- Highly Suspect
- Buddy Holly and the Crickets
- Hot Tuna (three power trio albums from 1974 to 1977)
- House of Large Sizes
- Hüsker Dü
- Hot Club de Paris

== I ==
- Interpol

== J ==
- James Gang
- Jawbreaker
- The Jimi Hendrix Experience
- John Mayer Trio
- The Joy Formidable

== K ==
- Kamchatka
- Karma to Burn
- Killdozer
- King's X
- KXM
- Khruangbin

== L ==
- Lifehouse
- The Lawrence Arms
- Leño
- Leusemia
- The London Souls
- Los Lonely Boys
- Love of Diagrams
- Low

== M ==
- Mantra Sunrise
- May Blitz
- Meat Puppets
- Melvins
- Menomena
- Metz
- Minutemen
- Mischief Brew
- Modest Mouse (between 1996 and 1997)
- Mondo Generator
- Morphine
- Motörhead
- Mountain
- Muse
- MxPx
- Motorpsycho

== N ==
- Nada Surf until 2010, when Doug Gillard joined on second guitar
- Nebula
- Niacin
- The Nice
- Ningen Isu
- Nirvana
- Nomeansno
- November

== O ==
- One Man Army
- The Outfield

== P ==
- Peer Günt
- Pepper
- Peter Bjorn and John
- Placebo
- The Police
- The Presidents of the United States of America
- Primus
- Los Prisioneros
- Prong

== Q ==
- Qui

== R ==
- Radio Moscow
- Raven (quartet 1974–1981, power trio 1981–present)
- The Rods
- Rose Hill Drive
- Rush
- Russian Circles

== S ==
- Sasquatch
- Sausage
- The Screaming Blue Messiahs
- Screaming Females
- Sebadoh
- The Secret Machines
- Shellac
- Shrug
- Silverchair
- Sick Puppies
- Sleater-Kinney
- Sleep
- Soda Stereo
- Sodom (from 1981 until 2018)
- Soft Machine
- Spiderbait
- State Radio
- Stick Men
- The Steepwater Band
- Steve Morse Band
- Stöner
- Stray Cats
- Sublime
- The Subways
- Sugar
- Sunflower Bean (until 2019, when Danny Ayala was added)
- Super 400

== T ==
- Talas
- Taste
- Tera Melos
- The Tea Party
- Therapy?
- The Thermals
- Them Crooked Vultures
- Thin Lizzy (first three albums)
- Thirty Seconds to Mars
- Those Darlins
- Tiger Army
- Tiny Moving Parts
- Triumph
- Triggerfinger
- TTNG

== U ==
- U.K.
- Unearthly Trance
- Urge Overkill

== V ==
- Vardis
- Venom
- Violent Femmes
- Voice of Baceprot

== W ==
- Wakrat
- Walt Mink
- The Warning
- We Are Scientists
- West, Bruce and Laing
- Wild Adriatic
- White Lies
- The Winery Dogs
- Wipers
- Wolfmother
- The Wombats

== X ==
- The XX

== Y ==
- Yawning Man
- Yeah Yeah Yeahs
- Year Long Disaster
- The Young Gods
- Young Knives
- Yo La Tengo (since 1992, with the exception of one album in 2015)
- Yob

== Z ==
- Zebra
- ZZ Top

== # ==
- 50 Foot Wave
- The 5.6.7.8s
