= Budgie (album) =

Studio album by Budgie
- Released: 30 July 1971
- Recorded: 1971
- Studios: Rockfield (Monmouth, Wales)
- Genre: Heavy metal
- Length: 40:40
- Label: Kapp/MCA
- Producer: Rodger Bain

Budgie chronology
Budgie (1971)	Squawk (1972)

Budgie is the debut album by the Welsh heavy metal band Budgie. It was released on 30 July 1971, through MCA Records. The US version on Kapp Records includes "Crash Course in Brain Surgery", originally released as a single and covered by Metallica on their 1987 EP The $5.98 E.P. - Garage Days Re-Revisited. "Homicidal Suicidal" has also been covered by the Seattle grunge band Soundgarden. Canadian band Thrush Hermit covered "Nude Disintegrating Parachutist Woman" on the album All Technology Aside, included on the 2010 The Complete Recordings box set.

== Reception ==
Professional ratings
Review scores
Source	Rating
AllMusic	4.5/5 stars

Sounds criticized the album as being somewhat undistinguished, but praised it for having "a lot of good natured foot-tapping music" and concluded "I certainly find it infinitely preferable to Black Sabbath, and I have the feeling that Budgie might develop into something a lot more interesting."

In a brief retrospective review, AllMusic declared that "For those seriously interested in metal's development, bombastic treasures like 'Homicidal Suicidal,' and 'Nude Disintegrating Parachutist Woman' are essential listening."

== Track listing ==
All tracks are written by Burke Shelley, Tony Bourge and Ray Phillips.

Side one
No.	Title	Length
1.	"Guts"	4:20
2.	"Everything in My Heart"	1:00
3.	"The Author"	6:25
4.	"Nude Disintegrating Parachutist Woman"	8:30

Side two
No.	Title	Length
5.	"Rape of the Locks"	6:10
6.	"All Night Petrol"	6:00
7.	"You and I"	1:45
8.	"Homicidal Suicidal"	6:30

2004 remaster bonus tracks
No.	Title	Length
9.	"Crash Course in Brain Surgery" (single, alternate mix)	2:36
10.	"Nude Disintegrating Parachutist Woman" (single edit)	4:08
11.	"Nude Disintegrating Parachutist Woman" (2003 version)	3:45
12.	"Guts" (2003 version)	3:53

== Personnel ==
Budgie

- Tony Bourge – guitar
- Burke Shelley – bass, vocals, mellotron
- Ray Phillips – drums, percussion

Additional personnel

- Rodger Bain – production
- Ray Dorsey – liner notes
- Shepard Sherbell – design, photography
- David Sparling – artwork, cover painting

== Charts ==
Chart (1971)	Peak position
Australian Albums (Kent Music Report)	36
