= Squawk (album) =

- Cover art by Roger Dean

Studio album by Budgie
- Released: 1 September 1972
- Recorded: 1972
- Studios: Rockfield (Monmouth, Wales)
- Genre: Heavy metal
- Length: 38:29
- Label: Kapp Records/MCA
- Producer: Rodger Bain

Budgie chronology
Budgie (1971)	Squawk (1972)	Never Turn Your Back on a Friend (1973)

Squawk is the second Rodger Bain produced studio album by the heavy metal power trio band, Budgie. It was released in September 1972 on Kapp Records. The album was certified Gold in 1973. The cover art was done by Roger Dean.

Professional ratings
Review scores
Source	Rating
AllMusic	4/5 stars

== Track listing ==
All tracks are written by Burke Shelley, Tony Bourge and Ray Phillips.

Side one
No.	Title	Length
1.	"Whiskey River"	3:23
2.	"Rocking Man"	5:25
3.	"Rolling Home Again"	1:43
4.	"Make Me Happy"	2:37
5.	"Hot as a Docker's Armpit"	5:51

Side two
No.	Title	Length
6.	"Drugstore Woman"	3:14
7.	"Bottled" (instrumental)	1:52
8.	"Young Is a World"	8:07
9.	"Stranded"	6:17

2004 remaster bonus tracks
No.	Title	Length
10.	"Whiskey River" (A side single version)	2:39
11.	"Stranded" (alternate mix)	6:19
12.	"Whiskey River" (2003 version)	3:20
13.	"Rolling Home Again" (2004 version)	1:38

== Personnel ==
Budgie

- Burke Shelley – vocals, bass, Mellotron, piano
- Tony Bourge – guitar
- Ray Phillips – drums
