= In for the Kill! =

Studio album by Budgie
- Released: 17 May 1974
- Recorded: 1974; 1971 ("Crash Course in Brain Surgery")
- Studios: Rockfield Studios, Monmouth, Wales; Lee Sound Studios, Birmingham
- Genre: Heavy metal
- Length: 40:46
- Label: MCA
- Producer: Budgie

Budgie chronology
Never Turn Your Back on a Friend (1973)	In for the Kill! (1974)	Bandolier (1975)

Professional ratings
Review scores
Source	Rating
AllMusic	3/5 stars
The Rolling Stone Record Guide	1/5 stars

In for the Kill! is the fourth studio album by Welsh heavy metal band Budgie. It was released through MCA Records in May 1974. The album includes the song "Crash Course in Brain Surgery," originally released in 1971 as a single and was included on their self-titled debut album. The song was covered by Metallica for their 1987 EP The $5.98 E.P. - Garage Days Re-Revisited, while the album's title track was covered by Van Halen during the group's club days.

== Track listing ==
All tracks are written by Tony Bourge and Burke Shelley, except where noted.

Side one
No.	Title	Writer(s)	Length
1.	"In for the Kill"		6:24
2.	"Crash Course in Brain Surgery"	Shelley, Bourge, Ray Phillips	2:34
3.	"Wondering What Everyone Knows"		2:50
4.	"Zoom Club"		9:51

Side two
No.	Title	Length
5.	"Hammer and Tongs"	6:46
6.	"Running from My Soul"	3:32
7.	"Living on Your Own"	8:49

2004 remaster bonus tracks
No.	Title	Length
8.	"Zoom Club" (single edit)	3:27
9.	"In for the Kill" (2003 version)	3:34
10.	"Crash Course in Brain Surgery" (2003 version)	2:44
11.	"Zoom Club" (2003 version)	6:04

== Personnel ==
Budgie

- Burke Shelley - bass guitar, vocals
- Tony Bourge - guitar
- Pete Boot - drums
- Ray Phillips - drums on "Crash Course in Brain Surgery"

Production staff

- Budgie - producer
- Rodger Bain - producer for "Crash Course in Brain Surgery"
- Kingsley Ward - engineer
- Pat Moran - engineer

== Charts ==
Chart (1974)	Peak position
UK Albums (Official Charts)	29
