= If Swallowed, Do Not Induce Vomiting =

EP by Budgie
- Released: July 1980
- Recorded: 1980
- Studios: Rockfield Studios, Monmouth, Wales
- Genres: Hard rock, heavy metal
- Length: 19:32
- Labels: RCA, Active Records
- Producers: Budgie & Dave Charles

If Swallowed, Do Not Induce Vomiting is a 12" EP by Budgie released in July 1980 on Active Records, a sublabel of RCA.

The 1993 Repertoire Records and 1996 Griffin Music CD re-issues of Power Supply included the EP as bonus tracks. In 2012, the EP was issued on CD by Noteworthy Productions with live versions of "High School Girls" and "Panzer Division Destroyed" as bonus tracks.

Professional ratings
Review scores
| Source | Rating |
|---|---|
| AllMusic | 2/5 stars |

== Track listing ==
All tracks are written by Burke Shelley, except where noted.

Side one
| No. | Title | Writer(s) | Length |
|---|---|---|---|
| 1. | "Wild Fire" | Shelley, Steve Williams, John Thomas | 5:13 |
| 2. | "High School Girls" | | 3:39 |

Side two
| No. | Title | Writer(s) | Length |
|---|---|---|---|
| 1. | "Panzer Division Destroyed" | Shelley, Thomas | 5:55 |
| 2. | "Lies of Jim (The E Type Lover)" | | 4:45 |

2012 remaster bonus tracks
| No. | Title | Writer(s) | Length |
|---|---|---|---|
| 5. | "High School Girls" (Live, 1980) | | 3:49 |
| 6. | "Panzer Division Destroyed" (Live, 1980) | Shelley, Thomas | 6:20 |

== Personnel ==
Budgie

- Burke Shelley - vocals, bass
- John Thomas - guitar
- Steve Williams - drums
