= The $5.98 E.P. – Garage Days Re-Revisited =

EP by Metallica
- Released: August 10, 1987 (UK), August 21, 1987 (US)
- Recorded: July 1987
- Studios: A&M (Santa Monica, California); Conway (Los Angeles, California)
- Genre: Thrash metal
- Length: 25:05
- Label: Elektra
- Producer: Metallica

Metallica chronology
Master of Puppets (1986)	The $5.98 E.P. – Garage Days Re-Revisited (1987)	...And Justice for All (1988)

Professional ratings
Review scores
Source	Rating
AllMusic	3/5 stars
Chicago Tribune	2.5/4 stars

The $5.98 E.P. – Garage Days Re-Revisited (Note: released on CD as The $9.98 CD – Garage Days Re-Revisited) is the first extended play by American heavy metal band Metallica, released on August 21, 1987, by Elektra Records. It consists of covers of late-'70s and early-'80s new wave of British heavy metal bands and punk rock music rehearsed in Lars Ulrich's soundproofed garage and then recorded in Los Angeles over the course of six days. It is the group's first release following the death of bassist Cliff Burton and the first to feature his successor, Jason Newsted.

== Development ==
With Metallica scheduled to play the 1987 Monsters of Rock festival at Castle Donington, the band's UK label Vertigo Records suggested that they release new material to mark the occasion. Initial songwriting attempts with new bassist Jason Newsted resulted only in a demo for "Blackened", and vocalist/guitarist James Hetfield subsequently broke his arm skateboarding and was unable to play guitar for several weeks. Given these obstacles, the band decided to record covers of some of their favorite songs rather than work on new material. Newsted utilized his earlier experience as a construction worker to soundproof Lars Ulrich's garage in El Cerrito, California, where the band would rehearse the material prior to recording.

While rehearsing the song "White Lightning" by new wave of British heavy metal band Paralex, Kirk Hammett started playing "The Wait" by post-punk group Killing Joke, and the band subsequently recorded the song. Other tracks considered but dropped include "Signal Fire" by Japanese band Bow Wow and another NWOBHM song, Gaskin's "I'm No Fool". Though "Last Caress" and "Green Hell" are combined into a single track by Metallica, the original Misfits versions were featured on different albums and were recorded five years apart. The outro of the EP features a wildly off-key segment of the Iron Maiden song "Run to the Hills." The speculation surrounding this ending was a view into the simmering feud in the mid-1980s between the British heavy metal legends and the American newcomers.

The band included The $5.98 E.P. in the title in an effort to ensure that retailers did not overcharge fans. The title of the official American CD release was amended to The $9.98 CD, as the retail price of CDs was much higher than cassette; other countries retained the original The $5.98 E.P. title. When The $5.98 EP was released in Australia, it instead featured a hype sticker warning customers that $5.98 was actually the title of the album, rather than the retail price. "The Wait" was omitted from the UK pressings in order to conform to local music-industry rules regarding the length of EPs.

The $5.98 E.P. – Garage Days Re-Revisited was out of print from 1989 to 2018, and the original release is considered a collector's item. All five tracks were included on the 1998 double album Garage Inc. along with other covers and new recordings. The cover of the CD also was used as a basis for the Garage Inc. back cover, which shows the original Garage Days cover with pictures of the band members' faces, c. 1998, taped over the original faces, along with Garage Inc. covering the original album name.

In 2018, The $5.98 E.P. – Garage Days Re-Revisited was reissued under Metallica's own Blackened Recordings label and also was made available in vinyl format.

== Track listing ==
No.	Title	Writer(s)	Original artist	Length
1.	"Helpless"	Sean Harris, Brian Tatler	Diamond Head	6:39
2.	"The Small Hours"	John Mortimer	Holocaust	6:43
3.	"The Wait"	Jaz Coleman, Geordie Walker, Martin Glover, Paul Ferguson	Killing Joke	4:55
4.	"Crash Course in Brain Surgery"	Burke Shelley, Tony Bourge, Ray Phillips	Budgie	3:10
5.	"Last Caress/Green Hell"	Glenn Danzig	Misfits	3:30
Total length:				25:05

On the original North American vinyl release, Side A featured tracks 1 and 2, and Side B featured tracks 3, 4 and 5.

== Personnel ==
- James Hetfield – rhythm guitar, vocals
- Kirk Hammett – lead guitar
- Jason Newsted – bass guitar (credited as "Master J Newkid")
- Lars Ulrich – drums

=== Production ===
All information derived from the liner notes.

- Arranged and "not very produced" by Metallica
- Engineer: Csaba "The Hut" Petocz; assisted by Greg Dennen and Marnie Riley
- Recorded and mixed at A&M and Conway Studios
- Original mastering by Ron Lewter (at The Mastering Lab)
- Remastering by Chris Bellman at Bernie Grundman Mastering

== Chart positions ==
Album

Year	Chart	Position
1987	Billboard 200	28
1987	UK Albums (OCC)	27
2018
2018	Hungarian Albums (MAHASZ)	10
2018	Polish Albums (ZPAV)	22
2018	Spanish Albums (Promusicae)	12
2018	US Billboard 200	18

=== Certifications ===
Region	Certification	Certified units/sales
Canada (Music Canada)	Gold	50,000^{^}
Finland	—	6,000
United States (RIAA)	Platinum	1,000,000^{^}
^{^} Shipments figures based on certification alone.

== See also ==
- A Garage Dayz Nite
