= We Came, We Saw... =

Live album by Budgie
- Released: 1997
- Recorded: 1980–82
- Venue: Reading Festival, Reading
- Genre: Hard rock, heavy metal
- Length: 84:03
- Label: New Millennium Communications
- Producer: Budgie

Budgie chronology
| Best of Budgie (1997) | We Came, We Saw... (1997) | Heavier Than Air – Rarest Eggs (1998) |

We Came, We Saw... is an album of compiled live tracks by the Welsh rock band Budgie, collected from their performances at the Reading Festival in 1980 and 1982, with an emphasis on songs released during that period rather than the band's older, more well-known work. Heavier Than Air - Rarest Eggs is a companion to this album. These tracks were later included, along with others, on the 2006 collection The BBC Recordings.

Professional ratings
Review scores
| Source | Rating |
|---|---|
| Allmusic | 3/5 stars |

== Track listing ==
=== Disc 1 ===
1. "Breaking All the House Rules" – 7:10
2. "Crime Against the World" – 5:43
3. "Napoleon Bona Part One and Part Two" – 7:37
4. "Forearm Smash" – 6:03
5. "Panzer Division Destroyed" – 6:14
6. "Wildfire" – 6:09
7. "Breadfan" – 6:58

=== Disc 2 ===
1. "Forearm Smash" – 6:57
2. "Crime Against the World" – 5:17
3. "I Turned to Stone" – 6:29
4. "Truth Drug" – 4:27
5. "Superstar" – 4:25
6. "She Used Me Up" – 3:45
7. "Panzer Division Destroyed" – 6:48
