= George Hatcher Band =

American musical group

- Origin: London, England
- Genres: Southern Rock, Hard Rock
- Years active: 1975–2005; 2009-
- Labels: United Artists, Shark, Kaleidoscope, The Goods, Trout
- Members: George Hatcher; Ralph Oleski; Mike Bean; Blake ‘Hap’ Gross; Terry Collins; David Miller; John Hartley; Gustavo Juarez Sr.
- Past members: Curt Stines; Ace Philbeck; Joe Nims; Ricky Kirby; Joey Dunlevy; Danny Howe; Darren Watts; David Phelps; Mike Parnell; Tad Hough; James Morgan; Pete Gosling; Geraint Watkins; Vic Young; Mac Poole †; John Thomas†; Phil Swan; Harris Joannou; Steve Wren; Terry Slade
- Website: www.georgehatcherband.com

The George Hatcher Band is an American Southern Rock band formed by vocalist/songwriter George Hatcher (born March 8, 1947, in Bennettsville, South Carolina) after moving to England in the summer of 1975. Between 1976 and 1985, the group released 5 studio albums and one live in-studio EP.

Their first three releases were produced by Tom Allom and issued on United Artists. After a hiatus, Hatcher reformed the band with new members in the 2000s.

== Biography ==
Before forming the group, vocalist George Hatcher was a member of Asheville, North Carolina, band, Flatrock, who recorded two albums for North Carolina–based label, King Records, with producer Shadow Morton. Neither album was released and because of contractual problems, Flatrock broke up and Hatcher travelled to the UK. Arriving in August 1975, the first musicians Hatcher connected with were Curved Air members, drummer Stewart Copeland (later to co-found The Police) and violinist Darryl Way Hatcher joined their project, Stark Naked and the Car Thieves, and played a few club shows before deciding to form his own band.

Hatcher first met drummer Terry Slade, formerly of Renaissance, and then recruited guitarists Phil Swan, whom he knew personally, and John Thomas, whom he met in a club in Birmingham. Keyboardist Steve Wren and bassist Harris Joannou were recruited through friends and word of mouth.

While still unsigned, the group supported Man, Canned Heat and Dr. Feelgood around the UK. After playing a label showcase at Dingwalls at Camden Lock in London, they were approached by A&R executive Andrew Lauder who signed the group to a three-album deal with United Artists. Through Lauder, the band was introduced to producer Tom Allom who expressed interest in working with the band. They entered Wessex Sound Studios in London in the summer of 1976 and recorded their debut album Dry Run with Allom at the helm. John McFee, aka John McSteel, later to join the Doobie Brothers, would play pedal steel guitar on “Sunshine (Shine Down On Me)”, with Tony Carr providing percussion. To promote the record, they supported label mates, Dr. Feelgood, on their September/October Stupidity UK tour and Continental Europe in November as well as headlining their own shows.

The band quickly turned to writing and rehearsing for the next album. On December 12, 1976, they decided to invite a few friends and record some tracks at Olympic Studios in Barnes, London with a live audience. According to Hatcher, some 250 people showed up by four o’clock in the afternoon and the band proceeded to record covers of Blind Willie McTell’s "Statesboro Blues", based on the version popularized by the Allman Brothers Band, and Loggins and Messina’s "Good Friend" (which also appears on Dry Run), as well as a pair of originals, "Rockin’ in the Morning" and "Drinkin’ Man", the latter written on the spot and recorded on the first take. These four songs made up the 1977 Have Band Will Travel 10" EP.

Hatcher started off the new year with more live work, including a show with UFO in late January at Friars Aylesbury. After supporting Frankie Miller on March 26, 1977, at The Apollo in Glasgow, Scotland, the band headed straight into Wessex Sound Studios through the month of May to record their sophomore album, Talkin’ Turkey, with Tom Allom producing once more. Expanding on their sound, Hatcher brought in musicians from the London Symphony Orchestra, returning guest players Tony Carr and John McFee, as well as McFee's then Clover bandmate, Huey Lewis, credited as Huey Harp, on harmonica. Talkin’ Turkey and Have Band Will Travel were released in short succession and the George Hatcher Band appeared on the BBC in Concert series, broadcast on June 18. They also played the massive Reading Rock Festival on August 27, 1977, with headliners Thin Lizzy topping the bill. Earlier that month, they had supported Ted Nugent during his two-night stand at London's Hammersmith Odeon, and returned to the Hammersmith on October 25 as openers for AC/DC on their Let There Be Rock UK tour.

Soon thereafter, Hatcher dissolved the band due to members going in different directions in their personal and professional lives, with guitarist 'Big' John Thomas joining Welsh rockers Budgie. By 1978, Hatcher had put together a whole new line-up comprising guitarists James Morgan and Pete Gosling, keyboardist Geraint Watkins, bassist Vic Young, and drummer Mac Poole, best known for his earlier stints with Big Bertha and Warhorse. All but Morgan toured with Mickey Jupp on the "Be Stiff" Tour '78 as Mickey Jupp & The Cable Layers, documented on Jupp's 2004 archives release Live At The BBC. Signing a new record deal with German label Shark Records, Hatcher and his band headed to Germany where they recorded Rich Girl, with engineer and co-producer Manfred ‘Manni’ Neuner at Tonstudio Hiltpoltstein near Nürnberg. The album, a mix of originals and covers, was released under the shortened name George Hatcher and supported with a UK tour.

At the time, Hatcher began to contemplate a return to the U.S. traveling back and forth between England and his native North Carolina. In 1980, Hatcher assembled a new all-American line-up comprising guitarists Curt Stines and David Phelps, bassist Mike Parnell, keyboardist Tad Hough, and drummer Danny Howe. Reverting to the George Hatcher Band moniker, the group returned to Manni Neuner's Tonstudio Hiltpoltstein in Germany to cut 1980's Coming Home. They were joined by original GHB guitarist Phil Swan who made a guest appearance on three songs. The album's epic eight-minute title track became something of signature tune for the band as well as a strong fan favorite. Originally released on Shark and Kaleidoscope, respectively, the album was licensed stateside by The Goods Records in 1982. By then, Hatcher was firmly based in the U.S. again where the band supported major acts such as Black Sabbath, Scorpions, Ted Nugent, Molly Hatchet, The Outlaws, Cheap Trick, Billy Idol, Johnny Van Zant, Black Oak Arkansas, and The Kinks, often as the Charlotte Coliseum.

The George Hatcher Band recorded one final album for Trout Records in 1985. Recorded at the Arthur "Guitar Boogie" Smith's (of "Dueling Banjos" fame) studio in Charlotte, North Carolina, Hindsight featured Hatcher, Stines and Howe in addition to newcomers Ace Philbeck on guitar, Joe Nims on bass, Ricky Kirby on keyboards, and Joey Dunlevy on keyboards and saxophone. Despite no longer recording new music, Hatcher continued to tour through 2005, including playing in front of 80.000 people with 38 Special during Charlotte's Speed Street festival in 2002, before putting music on hold and going to college to pursue a master's degree in psychology. The band has since been re-activated and Dry Run and Coming Home were re-issued on CD in 2011 and released digitally.

Original GHB guitarist John Thomas died on March 3, 2016, from pneumonia. Drummer Mac Poole, who recorded the Rich Girl album with Hatcher, died on May 21, 2015, after a long battle with throat cancer.

== Discography ==
=== Studio albums ===
- 1976: Dry Run (United Artists)
- 1977: Talkin' Turkey (United Artists)
- 1978: Rich Girl (Shark)
- 1980: Coming Home (Shark, Kaleidoscope, The Goods)
- 1985: Hindsight (Trout)

=== EPs ===
- 1977: Have Band Will Travel (United Artists)
