= BBC Radio 1 Live in Concert =

BBC Radio 1 Live in Concert is a series of recordings of the BBC Radio 1 concert series BBC Radio 1 Live. The albums are licensed to Windsong International.

== Albums ==
- BBC Radio 1 Live: Steve Hillage Live in Concert
- BBC Radio 1 Live in Concert (All About Eve album), by All About Eve
- BBC Radio 1 Live in Concert (Atomic Rooster album)
- BBC Radio 1 Live in Concert (Caravan album)
- BBC Radio 1 Live in Concert (Wishbone Ash album)
- BBC Radio One Live in Concert (Dexys Midnight Runners album)
- BBC Radio 1 Live in Concert (Echo & the Bunnymen album)
- BBC Radio 1 Live in Concert (The Fall album), by The Fall
- BBC Radio 1 Live in Concert (Hawkwind album)
- BBC Radio 1 Live in Concert (Lone Justice album)
- BBC Radio One Live in Concert (The Long Ryders album)
- BBC Radio 1 Live in Concert (The Michael Schenker Group album), by The Michael Schenker Group
- BBC Radio 1 Live in Concert (Nazareth album)
- BBC Radio One Live in Concert (New Model Army album)
- BBC Radio 1 Live in Concert (New Order album)
- BBC Radio 1 Live In Concert (Paice Ashton Lord album)
- BBC Radio 1 Live in Concert (Skids album), by Skids
- BBC Radio 1 Live in Concert (Steve Earle album)
- BBC Radio 1 Live in Concert (Stiff Little Fingers album)
- BBC Radio One Live in Concert (Thin Lizzy album)
- BBC Radio 1 Live in Concert (Ultravox album), by Ultravox
- BBC Radio 1 Live in Concert (XTC album)

== See also ==
- Live at the BBC (disambiguation)
