= Impeckable =

Studio album by Budgie
- Released: 17 February 1978
- Recorded: 1977
- Studios: Springfield Sound, Aylmer, Ontario
- Genre: Heavy metal
- Length: 41:08
- Label: A&M
- Producers: Budgie, Richard Manwaring

Budgie chronology
If I Were Brittania I'd Waive the Rules (1976)	Impeckable (1978)	Power Supply (1980)

Professional ratings
Review scores
Source	Rating
AllMusic	2/5 stars

Impeckable is the seventh album by the Welsh heavy metal band Budgie. It was released in February 1978 on A&M Records. Guitarist Tony Bourge left the band after the album was released.

== Track listing ==
All tracks are written by Tony Bourge and Burke Shelley, except where noted.

Side one
No.	Title	Length
1.	"Melt the Ice Away"	3:33
2.	"Love for You and Me"	4:04
3.	"All at Sea"	4:21
4.	"Dish It Up"	4:21
5.	"Pyramids"	4:22

Side two
No.	Title	Writer(s)	Length
1.	"Smile Boy Smile"		4:31
2.	"I'm a Faker Too"		4:48
3.	"Don't Go Away"	Blanche Shelley, Burke Shelley	4:56
4.	"Don't Dilute the Water"		6:12

2010 remaster bonus tracks
No.	Title	Length
10.	"Smile Boy Smile" (single edit)	3:35
11.	"Don't Dilute the Water" (2008 version)	4:20
12.	"All at Sea" (2008 version)	3:51

== Personnel ==
Budgie

- Burke Shelley – bass guitar, vocals
- Tony Bourge – guitar
- Steve Williams – drums, percussion, vocals

Technical

- Budgie – record producer
- Richard Manwaring – producer and audio engineer
- Bob Leth – assistant engineer
- Michael Ross – album art director
- Nick Marshall – album art design
- Sally Anne Thompson – cat photography
- Hans Reinhard – bird photography
- Mastered at Sterling Sound in New York City
