= Nightflight (Budgie album) =

Studio album by Budgie
- Released: 2 October 1981
- Recorded: 1981
- Studios: Rockfield Studios, Monmouth, Wales
- Genres: Hard rock; heavy metal
- Length: 32:36
- Label: RCA
- Producer: Don Smith

Budgie chronology
| Power Supply (1980) | Nightflight (1981) | Deliver Us from Evil (1982) |

Nightflight is the ninth album by the Welsh heavy metal band Budgie, released on 2 October 1981 on RCA Records. A remastered version, with two live tracks from 1981, was released in 2013. The illustration on the cover is by Derek Riggs.

Professional ratings
Review scores
| Source | Rating |
|---|---|
| Allmusic | 3/5 stars |

== Track listing ==
All tracks are written by Burke Shelley and John Thomas.

Side one
| No. | Title | Length |
|---|---|---|
| 1. | "I Turned to Stone" | 6:11 |
| 2. | "Keeping a Rendezvous" | 3:45 |
| 3. | "Reaper of the Glory" | 3:50 |
| 4. | "She Used Me Up" | 3:17 |

Side two
| No. | Title | Length |
|---|---|---|
| 5. | "Don't Lay Down and Die" | 3:35 |
| 6. | "Apparatus" | 2:52 |
| 7. | "Superstar" | 3:28 |
| 8. | "Change Your Ways" | 4:22 |
| 9. | "Untitled Lullaby" (instrumental) | 1:16 |

2013 Remaster Bonus Tracks
| No. | Title | Length |
|---|---|---|
| 10. | "She Used Me Up" (live, 1981) | 3:03 |
| 11. | "Superstar" (live, 1981) | 3:55 |

== Personnel ==
Budgie

- Burke Shelley – bass guitar, vocals
- John Thomas – electric, acoustic and slide guitars, vocals
- Steve Williams – drums

Production

- Andrew Christian – sleeve design
- Derek Riggs – Illustration
- Adrian Hopkins – management

== Charts ==
| Chart (1981) | Peak position |
|---|---|
| UK Albums (Official Charts) | 68 |
