= Life in San Antonio =

Live album by Budgie
- Released: 2002
- Recorded: 2 August 2002
- Genre: Heavy metal
- Length: 75:30
- Label: RCA
- Producer: Don Smith

Budgie chronology
Deliver Us from Evil (1982)	Life in San Antonio (2002)	The Last Stage (2004)

Life in San Antonio is a reunion 2002 album by Budgie, recorded live on 2 August at the Sunken Garden Theater in San Antonio, Texas.

Professional ratings
Review scores
Source	Rating
Allmusic	3.5/5 stars

== Track listing ==
No.	Title	Length
1.	"Crime Against the World"	5:58
2.	"Melt the Ice Away"	4:01
3.	"Gunslinger"	5:41
4.	"Panzer Division Destroyed"	6:26
5.	"I Turned to Stone"	6:23
6.	"Black Velvet Stallion"	6:59
7.	"In for the Kill/Rape of the Locks/Guts"	7:45
8.	"Breaking All the House Rules"	3:04
9.	"Zoom Club"	6:15
10.	"Napoleon Bona-Parts One and Two"	7:33
11.	"Wild Fire"	7:25
12.	"Breadfan/Nude Disintegrating Parachutist Woman"	7:53

== Personnel ==
Budgie

- Burke Shelley - bass guitar, vocals
- Steve Williams - drums, percussion
- Andy Hart - guitar, vocals

== Trivia ==
The other bands that performed on this bill were:

- S.A. Sanctuary
- Oz Knozz
- Judas Priest
