= You're All Living in Cuckooland =

Studio album by Budgie
- Released: 7 November 2006
- Recorded: 2005–2006
- Genres: Hard rock, heavy metal
- Length: 53:16
- Label: NPL
- Producers: Burke Shelley, Nigel Thomas

Budgie chronology
The Last Stage (2004)	You're All Living in Cuckooland (2006)

Professional ratings
Review scores
Source	Rating
AllMusic	3.5/5 stars

You're All Living in Cuckooland is the eleventh and final album by the Welsh heavy metal band Budgie. Released in November 2006, it was their first official studio album in 24 years. It was accompanied by a UK tour.

== Track listing ==
All tracks are written by Burke Shelley and Simon Lees, except where noted.

No.	Title	Writer(s)	Length
1.	"Justice"		4:31
2.	"Dead Men Don't Talk"		6:08
3.	"We're All Living in Cuckooland"	Shelley	6:04
4.	"Falling"		5:22
5.	"Love Is Enough"	Shelley	2:25
6.	"Tell Me Tell Me"		4:47
7.	"(Don't Want To) Find That Girl"		6:28
8.	"Captain"	Shelley	3:43
9.	"I Don't Want to Throw You"		5:31
10.	"I'm Compressing the Comb on a Cockerel's Head"		8:17

== Personnel ==
Budgie

- Burke Shelley - vocals, bass
- Simon Lees - guitar
- Steve Williams - drums
