= If I Were Brittania I'd Waive the Rules =

Studio album by Budgie
- Released: 23 April 1976
- Recorded: 1976
- Studios: Rockfield Studios, Monmouth, Wales
- Genres: Heavy metal; Funk rock; Progressive rock
- Length: 35:51
- Label: A&M
- Producer: Budgie

Budgie chronology
Bandolier (1975)	If I Were Brittania I'd Waive the Rules (1976)	Impeckable (1978)

Professional ratings
Review scores
Source	Rating
AllMusic	2.5/5 stars

If I Were Brittania I'd Waive the Rules is the sixth album by the Welsh heavy metal band Budgie, released in April 1976.

The album is the band's first new release with A&M Records, having signed with them in late 1975 to distribute the US pressings of Bandolier. Musically, the band's usual hard rock / heavy metal style is augmented on this album with funk elements in two songs, and progressive rock in two others.

The title is a pun on the concept of Britannia ruling the waves. Professor Irene Morra of Cardiff University wrote that Budgie used this title to "declare an essential lack of agency within Britain" which helped portray a countercultural identity, lacking in national ambition.

== Track listing ==
All tracks are written by Burke Shelley and Tony Bourge.

Side one
No.	Title	Length
1.	"Anne Neggen"	4:04
2.	"If I Were Brittania I'd Waive the Rules"	5:50
3.	"You're Opening Doors"	4:14
4.	"Quacktor and Bureaucats"	3:52

Side two
No.	Title	Length
5.	"Sky High Percentage"	5:52
6.	"Heaven Knows Our Name"	3:52
7.	"Black Velvet Stallion"	8:07

2010 remaster bonus tracks
No.	Title	Length
8.	"You're Opening Doors" (2006 version)	3:38
9.	"Black Velvet Stallion" (2006 version)	7:56

== Personnel ==
Budgie

- Burke Shelley – bass, lead vocals
- Tony Bourge – guitar, backing vocals; lead vocals (track 6)
- Steve Williams – drums

Guest musicians

- Richard Dunn – keyboards

Production

- Pat Moran – mix engineer
- Fabio Nicoli – art director
- Alun Hood – illustrator
- Gered Mankowitz – photography

== Charts ==
Chart (1976)	Peak position
Australian Albums (Kent Music Report)	98
