= Heavier Than Air – Rarest Eggs =

Live album by Budgie
- Released: 1998
- Recorded: 1972–81
- Genre: Hard rock, heavy metal
- Label: New Millennium Communications
- Producer: Budgie

Budgie chronology
We Came, We Saw... (1997)	Heavier Than Air – Rarest Eggs (1998)	The BBC Recordings (2004)

Heavier Than Air – Rarest Eggs is an album of compiled live tracks spanning Budgie's career. We Came, We Saw... is a companion to this album.

Professional ratings
Review scores
Source	Rating
Allmusic	3/5 stars

== Track listing ==
=== Disc 1 ===
1. "Rape of the Locks" – 6:08
2. "Rocking Man" – 5:35
3. "Young Is a World" – 8:37
4. "Hot as a Docker's Armpit" – 5:42
5. "Sky High Percentage" – 5:39
6. "In the Grip of a Tyrefitter's Hand" – 5:45
7. "I Turned to Stone" – 6:09
8. "You're a Superstar" – 3:53
9. "She Used Me Up" – 3:08
10. "Hot as a Docker's Armpit" – 5:51
11. "The Author" – 6:56
12. "Whiskey River" – 4:25
13. "Nude Disintegrating Parachutist Woman" – 8:11

=== Disc 2 ===
1. "Breadfan" – 6:06
2. "You're the Biggest Thing Since Powdered Milk" – 8:08
3. "Melt The Ice Away" – 3:55
4. "In the Grip of a Tyrefitter's Hand" – 6:11
5. "Smile Boy Smile" – 4:24
6. "In for the Kill/You're the Biggest Thing Since Powdered Milk" – 7:04
7. "Love for You and Me" – 4:27
8. "Parents" – 10:19
9. "Who Do You Want for Your Love" – 6:29
10. "Don't Dilute the Water" – 6:04
11. "Breaking All the House Rules" – 6:30
12. "Breadfan" – 7:37
- Disc One:
  - Tracks 1–4 feature Burke Shelley, Tony Bourge and Ray Philips
  - Tracks 5, 6 feature Shelley, Bourge, Steve Williams and Myfyr Isaac
  - Tracks 7–9 feature Shelley, John Thomas and Williams
  - Tracks 10–13 feature Shelley, Bourge and Philips
- Disc Two:
  - Tracks 1, 2 feature Shelley, Bourge and Philips
  - Tracks 3–12 feature Shelley, Bourge, Williams and Isaac
- Disc One: 1972, 1976 & 1981 BBC Worldwide Music
- Disc Two: 1974, 1978 Budgie This Compilation © 1998 New
