= Live at the BBC (Electric Light Orchestra album) =

Live album by Electric Light Orchestra
- Released: 28 June 1999
- Recorded: 1973–1976
- Genre: Rock
- Length: 129:57
- Label: Eagle Records

Electric Light Orchestra chronology
The BBC Sessions (1999)	Live at the BBC (1999)	Friends & Relatives (1999)

Live at the BBC is a live two-disc compilation album featuring various line ups of the rock group Electric Light Orchestra (ELO). Released in 1999 and featuring various live BBC sessions as well as Live concert segments recorded by the BBC.

== Track listing ==
Tracks 1–4 recorded at The Paris Theatre, Lower Regent Street, London, England on 19 April 1973; transmitted 12 May 1974. Tracks 5–11 recorded at the Hippodrome, Golders Green, London, England on 25 January 1974; transmitted 2 February 1974.

All tracks are written by Jeff Lynne, except where noted.

Disc one
No.	Title	Writer(s)	Length
1.	"From the Sun to the World (Boogie No. 1)"		11:39
2.	"Kuiama"		10:27
3.	"In the Hall of the Mountain King"	Edvard Grieg	8:10
4.	"Roll Over Beethoven"	Chuck Berry	5:09
5.	"King of the Universe"		4:54
6.	"Bluebird is Dead"		4:09
7.	"Oh No Not Susan"		2:43
8.	"New World Rising"		6:39
9.	"Violin Solo / Orange Blossom Special"	Mik Kaminski / Ervin T. Rouse, Gordon Rouse	2:37
10.	"In the Hall of the Mountain King"	Grieg	4:56
11.	"Great Balls of Fire"	Otis Blackwell, Jack Hammer	3:25

Recorded at the Guildhall, Portsmouth, England on 22 June 1976; transmitted 6 November 1976.

Disc two
No.	Title	Length
1.	"Fire On High"	5:35
2.	"Poker"	4:20
3.	"Nightrider"	4:59
4.	"On the Third Day Medley" (Ocean Breakup / King Of The Universe / Oh No Not Susan / Bluebird Is Dead / Oh No Not Susan / New World Rising / Ocean Breakup)	13:14
5.	"Showdown"	4:45
6.	"Eldorado Overture / Can't Get It Out of My Head"	6:05
7.	"Poor Boy (The Greenwood)"	2:43
8.	"Illusions in G Major"	3:39
9.	"Strange Magic"	3:36
10.	"Evil Woman"	5:19
11.	"Ma-Ma-Ma Belle"	5:32
