= BBC Sessions (The Searchers album) =

2004 compilation album of The Searchers

Live album by The Searchers
- Released: 2004
- Recorded: 1964–1967
- Studios: BBC (the Playhouse Theatre, the Paris Theatre, Maida Vale)
- Genre: Rock/pop
- Label: Castle

BBC Sessions is a 2004 compilation double album featuring performances by English band The Searchers. All songs were originally broadcast on various BBC Light Programme radio shows from 1964 to 1967. The two-CD set consists of many of the band's hits or album tracks, 30 songs, including six songs which had never been recorded by them in the studio (including Bob Dylan's "Blowin' in the Wind") and 12 tracks of dialogue, mainly handled by drummer and band's spokesman Chris Curtis. The songs are essentially "live in studio" performances.

== Overview and recording ==
Assembled here is every BBC recording by the Searchers that has survived to date. It was not the BBC's practice to archive either the session tapes or the shows' master tapes and many of them were lost. No releasable tapes of the Tony Jackson era exist, the first included here is from 1964 with Frank Allen on bass guitar and vocals. All sessions are taken from the well-known shows hosted by Brian Matthew: Saturday Club, Top Gear or Saturday Swings. "Brian Matthew always tried to make us feel at home and at ease, as did his producer, Benie Andrews," wrote about recordings Mike Pender in his autobiography.

The Searchers recorded them at one of the BBC's usual locations the Playhouse Theatre, the Paris Theatre or the studio out at Maida Vale. "What usually happened was that we'd have done a gig late the previous night, and then we’d have to go in at 9.30 the next morning to tape the radio session," said guitarist John McNally. Normally there was no soundcheck and no overdubs. "We’d be a bit embarrassed by some of the stuff they broadcast," added McNally. Pender agreed: "Some of our performances were not as good as we would have liked, given more time and more technical support."

== Track listing ==
CD 1
No.	Title	Writer(s)	The Show	Length
1.	"When You Walk In The Room"	Jackie DeShannon	not known (1964)	2:18
2.	"Chris Curtis interview"	–	not known (1964)	0:57
3.	"This Feeling Inside"	Chris Curtis, Mike Pender, John McNally, Frank Allen	not known (1964)	1:39
4.	"What Have They Done to the Rain"	Malvina Reynolds	Saturday Club (30. 1. 1965)	2:49
5.	"The Searchers: Interview"	–	Saturday Club (30. 1. 1965)	1:32
6.	"Something You Got Baby"	Chris Kenner	Saturday Club (30. 1. 1965)	2:46
7.	"Let The Good Times Roll"	Shirley Goodman, Leonard Lee	Saturday Club (30. 1. 1965)	1:54
8.	"Everything You Do"	Chris Curtis	Top Gear (20. 2. 1965)	1:50
9.	"Chris Curtis interview"	–	Top Gear (20. 2. 1965)	1:12
10.	"Goodbye My Love"	Robert Mosley, Lamar Simington, Leroy Swearingen	Top Gear (20. 2. 1965)	3:02
11.	"Chris Curtis interview"	–	Saturday Club (26. 4. 1965)	0:29
12.	"Magic Potion"	Burt Bacharach, Hal David	Saturday Club (26. 4. 1965)	2:38
13.	"Chris Curtis interview"	–	Saturday Club (26. 4. 1965)	1:08
14.	"Bumble Bee"	LaVern Baker, Leroy Fullylove	Saturday Club (26. 4. 1965)	2:16
15.	"Everybody Come And Clap Your Hands"	Ellie Greenwich, John Barry	Saturday Club (26. 4. 1965)	2:23
16.	"Sweet Little Sixteen"	Chuck Berry	Saturday Swings (7. 5. 1965)	1:55
17.	"Mike Pender, Frank Allen and John McNally interview"	–	Saturday Swings (7. 5. 1965)	1:01
18.	"Glad All Over"	Aaron Schroeder, Sid Tepper, Roy C. Bennett	Saturday Swings (7. 5. 1965)	1:58
19.	"Chris Curtis interview"	–	Saturday Club (9. 7. 1965)	1:05
20.	"He's Got No Love"	Chris Curtis, Mike Pender	Saturday Club (9. 7. 1965)	2:30
21.	"Be My Baby"	Jeff Barry, Ellie Greenwich, Phil Spector	Saturday Club (9. 7. 1965)	2:37

CD 2
No.	Title	Writer(s)	The Show	Length
1.	"I'm Ready" * note: there is a wrong title on the cover: "Ready Teddy"	Fats Domino, Al Lewis, Sylvester Bradford	Saturday Club (19. 10. 1965)	2:03
2.	"Four Strong Winds"	Ian Tyson	Saturday Club (19. 10. 1965)	3:07
3.	"Chris Curtis interview"	–	Saturday Club (19. 10. 1965)	0:59
4.	"When I Get Home"	Bobby Darin, Russell Alquist	Saturday Club (19. 10. 1965)	2:10
5.	"I'm Never Coming Back"	Chris Curtis, Mike Pender	Saturday Club (19. 10. 1965)	1:59
6.	"Too Many Miles"	Chris Curtis, Mike Pender, John McNally, Frank Allen	Saturday Club (4. 12. 1965)	2:01
7.	"Mike Pender interview"	–	Saturday Club (4. 12. 1965)	0:39
8.	"Take Me For What I'm Worth"	P. F. Sloan	Saturday Club (4. 12. 1965)	2:43
9.	"It's Time"	John McNally	Saturday Club (4. 12. 1965)	1:55
10.	"Mike Pender interview"	–	Saturday Club (14. 5. 1966)	1:10
11.	"Take It Or Leave It"	Mick Jagger, Keith Richards	Saturday Club (14. 5. 1966)	2:34
12.	"Blowin' in the Wind"	Bob Dylan	Saturday Club (14. 5. 1966)	2:15
13.	"Mike Pender interview"	–	Saturday Club (17. 9. 1966)	1:00
14.	"Have You Ever Loved Somebody"	Allan Clarke, Graham Nash, Tony Hicks	Saturday Club (17. 9. 1966)	2:41
15.	"Medley: See See Rider/Jenny Take A Ride"	Gertrude "Ma" Rainey / Bob Crewe, Enotris Johnson, Richard Penniman	Saturday Club (11. 2. 1967)	2:13
16.	"Frank Allen interview"	–	Saturday Club (11. 2. 1967)	1:04
17.	"Popcorn Double Feature"	Larry Weiss, Scott English	Saturday Club (11. 2. 1967)	3:15
18.	"Goodbye, So Long"	Ike Turner	Saturday Club (11. 2. 1967)	2:06
19.	"I'll Be Loving You"	Chris Curtis, Mike Pender, John McNally, Frank Allen	Saturday Club (25. 3. 1967)	2:57
20.	"Western Union"	Mike Rabon, John Durrill, Norman Ezell	Saturday Club (6. 5. 1967)	2:29
21.	"I Don't Believe It"	Robery, Charles	Saturday Club (6. 5. 1967)	2:33

== Personnel ==
The Searchers

- Mike Pender – lead guitar, lead vocals, backing vocals
- John McNally – rhythm guitar, lead and backing vocals
- Frank Allen – bass, lead and backing vocals
- Chris Curtis – drums, lead and backing vocals
- John Blunt – drums (CD 2: 11, 12, 14, 15, 17, 18, 19, 20, 21)
