= The BBC Sessions (Electric Light Orchestra album) =

Live album by Electric Light Orchestra
- Released: 1999
- Recorded: 1973–1974
- Genre: Rock
- Length: 56:56
- Label: Eagle Records

Electric Light Orchestra chronology
Definitive Collection (1999)	The BBC Sessions (1999)	Live at the BBC (1999)

The BBC Sessions is a live compilation album of the British progressive rock band Electric Light Orchestra. The sessions were recorded at the BBC's Langham 1 studio and later broadcast on BBC programme In session with Bob Harris. The dates they were recorded/transmitted are:

- 11 January 1973 / 27 January 1973 (tracks 1–2)
- 25 April 1973 / 30 April 1973 (tracks 3–5)
- 13 February 1974 / 11 March 1974 (tracks 6–10)

The album features two early lineups of ELO:

Lineup One (Tracks 1–5)

- Jeff Lynne – Guitar & Vocals
- Bev Bevan – Drums
- Richard Tandy – Keyboards
- Mike de Albuquerque – Bass & Vocals
- Wilf Gibson – Violin
- Mike Edwards – Cello
- Colin Walker – Cello

Lineup Two (Tracks 6–10)

- Jeff Lynne – Guitar & Vocals
- Bev Bevan – Drums
- Richard Tandy – Keyboards
- Mike de Albuquerque – Bass & Vocals
- Mik Kaminski – Violin
- Mike Edwards – Cello
- Hugh McDowell – Cello

== Track listing ==
All tracks are written by Jeff Lynne, except where noted.

Disc one - In session with Bob Harris 22.01.72
No.	Title	Length
1.	"Kuiama"	11:06
2.	"Roll Over Beethoven" (Chuck Berry)	7:40
3.	"From the Sun to the World"	7:19
4.	"Momma"	6:56
5.	"In the Hall of the Mountain King" (Edvard Grieg)	5:42
6.	"King of the Universe"	2:35
7.	"Bluebird is Dead"	4:24
8.	"New World Rising"	4:02
9.	"Daybreaker"	3:32
10.	"Ma-Ma-Ma Belle"	3:40
Total length:		56:56
