= Radio Sessions 1974 & 1978 =

Live album by Budgie
- Released: 2005
- Recorded: 1974, 1978
- Genre: Hard rock heavy metal
- Producer: Budgie

Budgie chronology
The BBC Recordings (2004)	Radio Sessions 1974 & 1978 (2005)

Professional ratings
Review scores
Source	Rating
Allmusic	3.5/5 stars

Radio Sessions 1974 & 1978 is a double live album by Welsh rock band Budgie. The album tracks were taken from two live concerts; one at the Global Village in London in 1974, the other in Los Angeles in 1978.

== Track listing ==
Disc one: London, 1974
No.	Title	Length
1.	"Breadfan"	6:06
2.	"You're the Biggest Thing Since Powdered Milk"	8:18
3.	"Hammer and Tongs"	12:01
4.	"Zoom Club"	8:58
5.	"Parents"	8:38
6.	"Rocking Man"	9:22

Disc two: Los Angeles, 1978
No.	Title	Length
1.	"Melt the Ice Away"	3:56
2.	"In the Grip of a Tyrefitter's Hand"	6:02
3.	"Smile Boy Smile"	4:21
4.	"In for the Kill/You're the Biggest Thing Since Powdered Milk"	7:08
5.	"Love for You and Me"	4:09
6.	"Parents"	10:31
7.	"Who Do You Want for Your Love"	6:36
8.	"Don't Dilute the Water"	6:13
9.	"Breaking All the House Rules"	6:33
10.	"Breadfan"	7:37

== Personnel ==
=== London, 1974 ===
Budgie

- Burke Shelley - bass & vocals
- Tony Bourge - guitar
- Pete Boot - drums

=== Los Angeles, 1978 ===
Budgie

- Burke Shelley - bass, vocals
- Tony Bourge - guitar
- Myfyr Isaac - guitar
- Steve Williams - drums
