= Breadfan =

Song by Budgie

from the album Never Turn Your Back on a Friend
- Released: June 1973
- Genre: Heavy metal; hard rock
- Length: 6:04
- Label: MCA
- Songwriters: Burke Shelley; Tony Bourge; Ray Phillips
- Producer: Budgie

"Breadfan" is a song by Welsh blues rock/heavy metal power trio Budgie, appearing on their 1973 album Never Turn Your Back on a Friend. The title of the song refers to a person's relationship to money, with "bread" being a slang term for money. The lyrics further highlight the moral dilemmas on what to do with money; keep it, give it away, spend it and to be ultimately free of it and not to let it rule a life. The song is featured in the video game Brütal Legend and its introduction used in Brazilian television sports news programme Globo Esporte.

The original version had an initial 17 second excerpt of Winston Churchill's speech at the Mansion House, London on 10 November 1942, citing the words: "I have never promised anything but blood, toil, tears and sweat". Due to copyright issues, however, this had to be omitted from subsequent album pressings.

A promotional clip of the band performing the song was made by the band independently, using 18mm video tape; this was played on The Old Grey Whistle Test in 1973 as a fill-in when one of the scheduled artists failed to appear, but was thought to be lost. The film was later rediscovered, without the sound; this was restored by a technician at BBC Wales, and the clip was made available by the band with the remaster of the Never Turn Your Back on a Friend album in 2004. The video subsequently received over 8.6 million views on YouTube.

"Breadfan" is considered to be an influence on the development of progressive metal.

== Metallica cover ==
Metallica released a cover of the song in September 1988 as the B-side to their singles "Harvester of Sorrow", and "Eye of the Beholder". It was later included on their 1998 album Garage Inc., and was also used as an encore during their 1988–1989 tour supporting their ...And Justice for All album. A live video version is present on the Live Shit: Binge & Purge boxed set, taken from their Seattle concerts on 29 and 30 August 1989, when it was performed in the second encore. It was frequently used as an opener on the Shit Hits the Sheds Tour, and was also played with frequency during the Madly In Anger with the World and World Magnetic Tours. A short clip of "Breadfan" is played at the beginning of the "Whiskey in the Jar" music video.

== Other notable covers ==
- Sweet Savage at the 2008 Wacken Open Air festival.
- The Japanese band Ningen Isu also covered the song and it was recorded on their 1990 album No Longer Human under the name "針の山" (Hari no Yama - Hell's Mountain of Needles) as well as many live performances. Their version is not a direct translation, but rather an adaptation using concepts of a person's journey to Hell and their cyclic torture and penitence in the Mountain of Needles, sung in Japanese.
- The song was also covered by the Welsh band Florence Black.
- Rocky Gray also did a cover of the song for the console launch trailer of the video game Road Redemption.
- The song is played at the Principality Stadium in Cardiff during Welsh Rugby Union matches.
- The English band Alunah covered this song to coincide with the 50th anniversary of the release of Never Turn Your Back On A Friend.
