= Deliver Us from Evil (Budgie album) =

Studio album by Budgie
- Released: 8 October 1982
- Recorded: 1982
- Studios: Ridge Farm Studio, West Sussex, England; Eden Studio, London, England
- Genres: Hard rock, heavy metal
- Length: 39:08
- Label: RCA
- Producer: Don Smith

Budgie chronology
Nightflight (1981)	Deliver Us from Evil (1982)	Life In San Antonio (2002)

Professional ratings
Review scores
Source	Rating
Allmusic	2.5/5 stars

Deliver Us from Evil is the tenth album by the Welsh heavy metal band Budgie, released in October 1982 on RCA Records, and according to Burke Shelley its theme "attacks the power structures of East and West and the balance of terror"; it also "refers to all kinds of evil, not just The Bomb and war, but the main theme calls for world peace". One reviewer suggested that the album's lyrics were influenced by Shelley becoming a born-again Christian.

== Concept ==
According to Steve Williams, "the concept of the album came about as an accident. We didn't write 'Bored With Russia'. Don (Smith) brought that over from America and that started the ball rolling. We played it a few times and it started the whole concept". The song was written by producer Beau Hill, erroneously credited as Bo Hill, and demoed up with his late-1970s outfit Airborne. It was finally issued on the band's 2003 archives release The Dig.

Shelley said, "I know it makes me sound like some dated old hippy but I've always sung about things that matter to me. I believe you shouldn't kill people or be cruel. All the good things about the world are obvious and simple."

== Reception ==
Reception of the album was mixed, due to a more commercially oriented sound than previous releases. It has been described as either "a complete musical shipwreck" or "a collection which not only sounds fantastic but bristles with great songs and exquisite often Who-like arrangements". Their commercial appeal has been justified as a "conscious effort to broaden their horizons" in order to attend "a market more attuned to melody than mere muscle". The album release was followed with a UK tour from late October to December 1982.

Kerrang! noted it was "for all intents and purposes, a concept album, in that the theme inherent in the title runs throughout".

== Track listing ==
All tracks are written by Burke Shelley and John Thomas, except where noted.

Side one
No.	Title	Writer(s)	Length
1.	"Bored with Russia"	Bo Hill	3:49
2.	"Don't Cry"		3:19
3.	"Truth Drug"		4:23
4.	"Young Girl"	Mason, Grieves (Benjamin Laub)	2:18
5.	"Flowers in the Attic"		5:12

Side two
No.	Title	Writer(s)	Length
6.	"N.O.R.A.D. (Doomsday City)"		4:15
7.	"Give Me the Truth"		4:11
8.	"Alison"	Shelley	3:26
9.	"Finger on the Button"		3:59
10.	"Hold On to Love"		4:16

2013 remaster bonus tracks
No.	Title	Length
11.	"Bored with Russia" (single edit)	3:35
12.	"Truth Drug" (live 1982)	4:36
13.	"Flowers in the Attic" (live 1983)	5:00

== Personnel ==
Budgie

- Burke Shelley – vocals, bass
- John Thomas – guitar
- Steve Williams – drums
- Duncan Mackay – keyboards

Production

- Don Smith – recording, mixing
- Neill King – assistant engineer
- Keith Finney – assistant engineer
- Julian Mendelsohn – assistant engineer

== Charts ==
Chart (1982)	Peak position
UK Albums (Official Charts)	62
