= Never Turn Your Back on a Friend =

- Cover art by Roger Dean

Studio album by Budgie
- Released: 30 June 1973
- Recorded: February–March 1973
- Studio: Rockfield Studios, Rockfield, Wales
- Genre: Heavy metal
- Length: 41:29
- Label: MCA
- Producer: Budgie

Budgie chronology
Squawk (1972)	Never Turn Your Back on a Friend (1973)	In for the Kill! (1974)

Never Turn Your Back on a Friend is the third studio album by Welsh heavy metal band Budgie, released on 30 June 1973. This was drummer Ray Phillips' final appearance on a Budgie recording date. The album shows the band continuing the successful heavy metal formula of their previous album Squawk, adding a hint of speed metal in the single "Breadfan", one of the band's best known songs.

Roger Dean created the artwork for the album.

Professional ratings
Review scores
Source	Rating
Allmusic	4.5/5 stars

== Track listing ==
All tracks are written by Burke Shelley, Tony Bourge and Ray Phillips, except "Baby, Please Don't Go", written by Big Joe Williams.

Side one
No.	Title	Length
1.	"Breadfan"	6:04
2.	"Baby, Please Don't Go"	5:25
3.	"You Know I'll Always Love You"	2:12
4.	"You're the Biggest Thing Since Powdered Milk"	8:45

Side two
No.	Title	Length
5.	"In the Grip of a Tyrefitter's Hand"	6:18
6.	"Riding My Nightmare"	2:35
7.	"Parents"	10:10

2004 remaster bonus tracks
No.	Title	Length
8.	"Breadfan" (2003 version)	5:27
9.	"Parents" (2004 acoustic version)	5:37
10.	"Breadfan" (Live, 1973)	6:10

== Personnel ==
Budgie

- Burke Shelley - bass, lead vocals
- Tony Bourge - guitar, backing vocals
- Ray Phillips - drums
