= Bandolier (album) =

Studio album by Budgie
- Released: 5 September 1975
- Recorded: 1975
- Studios: Rockfield, Monmouth, Wales; Mayfair Sound, London
- Genres: Heavy metal; funk rock; progressive rock
- Length: 34:20
- Labels: MCA, A&M
- Producer: Budgie

Budgie chronology
In for the Kill! (1974)	Bandolier (1975)	If I Were Brittania I'd Waive the Rules (1976)

Professional ratings
Review scores
Source	Rating
AllMusic	4/5 stars

Bandolier is the fifth album by Welsh heavy metal band Budgie, released on 5 September 1975 through MCA Records. It reached No. 36 in the UK. The album was released in the US on A&M Records in late 1975. The cover art was created by artist Patrick Woodroffe. This was the first LP to feature drummer Steve Williams, who thereafter would play on all of Budgie's releases, along with Burke Shelley.

The song "I Can't See My Feelings" was covered by Iron Maiden on the B-side of their 1992 single "From Here to Eternity".

'Bandolier – Budgie', a free iTunes app for iPad, iPhone and iPod touch, was released in December 2011. It tells the story of the making of Bandolier in the band's own words, including an extensive audio interview with Burke Shelley.

== Track listing ==
All tracks are written by Tony Bourge and Burke Shelley, except where noted.

Side one
No.	Title	Length
1.	"Breaking All the House Rules"	7:23
2.	"Slipaway"	4:02
3.	"Who Do You Want for Your Love?"	6:10

Side two
No.	Title	Writer(s)	Length
4.	"I Can't See My Feelings"		5:54
5.	"I Ain't No Mountain"	Andy Fairweather Low	3:36
6.	"Napoleon Bona-Part One" (2:36) "Napoleon Bona-Part Two" (4:39)		7:15

2004 remaster bonus tracks
No.	Title	Length
7.	"Honey" (b-side "I Ain't No Mountain" single)	3:23
8.	"Breaking All the House Rules" (Live 1980)	6:32
9.	"Napoleon Bona-Parts One and Two" (Live 1980)	8:00
10.	"Who Do You Want for Your Love?" (Live 1975)	6:26

== Personnel ==
Budgie

- Burke Shelley – bass guitar, vocals
- Tony Bourge – guitar, vocals, harmonica
- Steve Williams – drums

Production

- Budgie – producer
- Richard Manwaring – engineer
- Pat Moran – engineer
- Ray Martinez – engineer
- John Pasche – art direction
- Pete Vernon – photography
- Patrick Woodroffe – cover illustration

== Charts ==
Chart (1975)	Peak position
Australian Albums (Kent Music Report)	75
UK Albums (Official Charts)	36
