= Power trio =

Rock band format having a lineup of electric guitar, bass, and drums

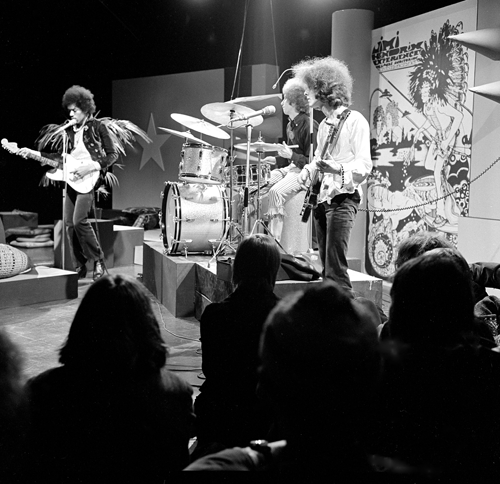
The Jimi Hendrix Experience

A power trio is a rock band format having a lineup of electric guitar, bass guitar and drum kit, leaving out a dedicated vocalist or an additional rhythm guitar or keyboard instrument that are often used in other rock music bands that are quartets and quintets. Larger rock bands often use one or more additional rhythm sections to fill out the sound with chords and harmony parts.

Most power trios in hard rock and heavy metal music use the electric guitar player in two roles; during much of the song, they play rhythm guitar, playing the chord progression for the song and performing the song's important riffs, and then switching to a lead guitar role during the guitar solo. While one or more band members typically sing while playing their instruments, power trios in hard rock and heavy metal music generally emphasize instrumental performance and overall sonic impact over vocals and lyrics.

== History ==
The rise of the power trio in the 1960s was made possible in part by developments in amplifier technology that greatly enhanced the volume of the electric guitar and bass. Particularly, the popularization of the electric bass guitar defined the bottom end and filled in the gaps. Since the amplified bass could also now be louder, the rest of the band could also play at higher volumes while still being able to hear the bass. This allowed a three-person band to have the same sonic impact as a large band but left far more room for improvisation and creativity, unencumbered by the need for detailed arrangements. As with the organ trio, a 1960s-era soul jazz group centered on the amplified Hammond organ, a three-piece group could fill a large bar or club with a big sound for a much lower price than a large rock and roll band. A power trio, at least in its blues rock incarnation, is also generally held to have developed out of Chicago-style blues bands such as Muddy Waters' trio.

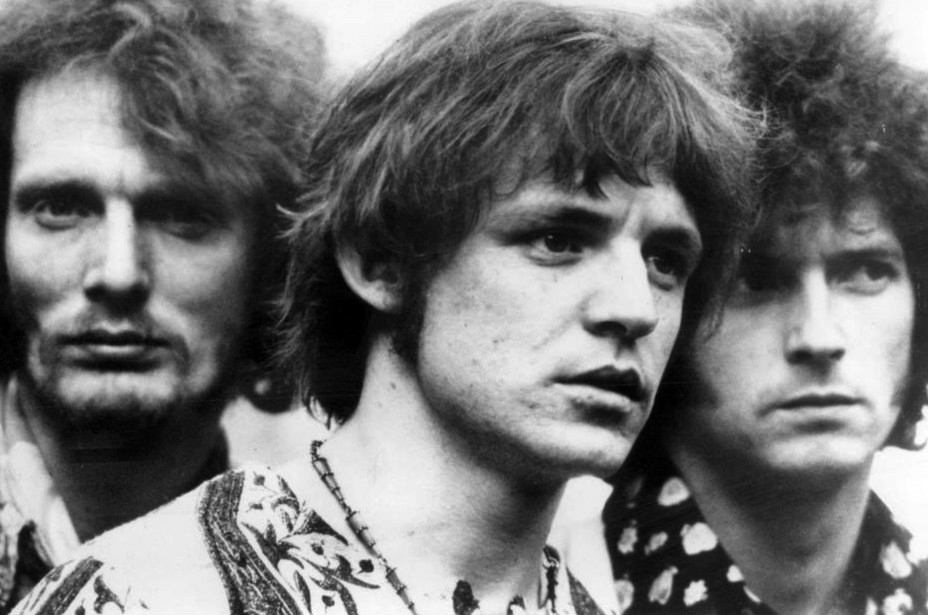
Cream

In addition to technological improvements, another impetus for the rise of the power trio was the virtuosity of guitarists such as Eric Clapton, Jimi Hendrix, and Rory Gallagher, who could essentially cover both the rhythm guitar and lead guitar roles in a live performance. In 1964, Frank Zappa played guitar in a power trio, the Muthers, with Paul Woods on bass and Les Papp on drums. In 1966, the prototypical blues-rock power trio Cream was formed, consisting of Eric Clapton on guitar/vocals, Jack Bruce on bass/vocals, and Ginger Baker on drums. Other influential 1960s-era blues rock/hard rock power trio bands were The Jimi Hendrix Experience, Blue Cheer, Grand Funk Railroad, James Gang, and Taste.

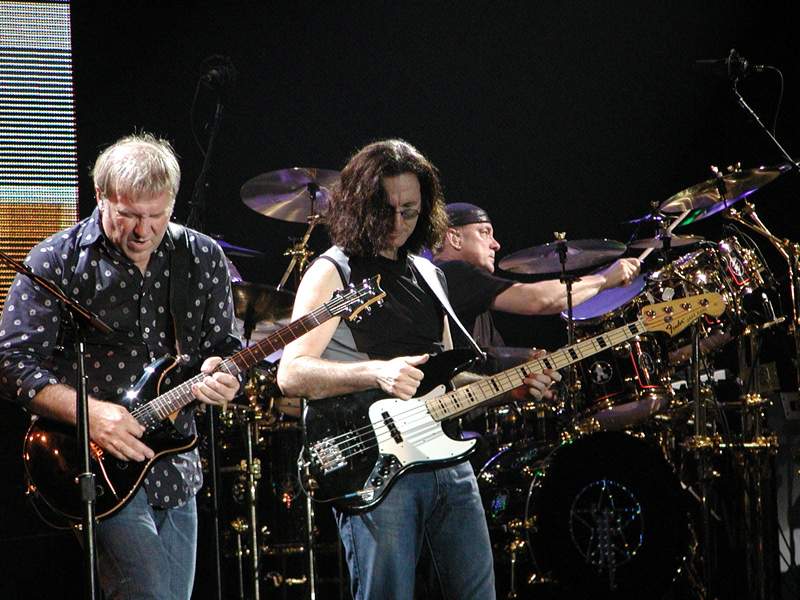
Rush

Well-known 1970s-era power trios include the Canadian progressive rock groups Rush and Triumph, the American band ZZ Top, the English heavy metal band Motörhead, and the Robin Trower Band. Emerson, Lake & Palmer (as well as its offshoot Emerson, Lake & Powell) is usually considered a power trio as Keith Emerson fulfilled the rhythm and lead playing on the keyboards that would usually fall on the guitarist, with bassist (and occasional guitarist) Greg Lake performing vocals. In 1968, the power trio Manal was formed in Argentina, and were the first group that composed blues music in Spanish.

Budgie were a Welsh Blues rock heavy metal band from Cardiff who formed in 1967. The band are considered a classic power trio who released ten albums. Budgie were one of the earliest heavy metal bands, and, according to Garry Sharpe-Young were a seminal influence on many acts of that scene, particularly the new wave of British heavy metal, and later acts such as Metallica, who covered " Breadfan" and "Crash Course in Brain Surgery" on their album Garage Inc. The band have been noted as "among the heaviest metal of its day".

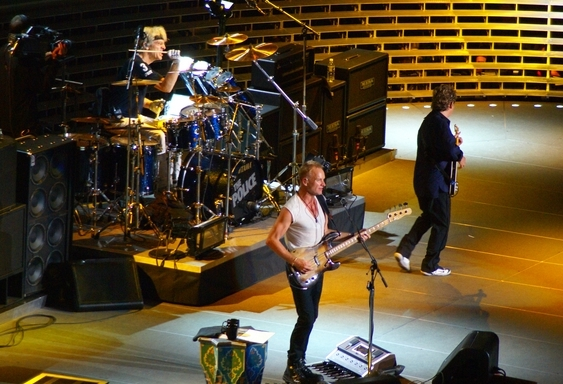
The Police

After the 1970s, the phrase "power trio" was applied to the new wave group the Police, grunge band Nirvana, extreme metal bands Hellhammer and Gallhammer, alternative rock bands Hüsker Dü and Concrete Blonde, mod revivalists the Jam, hard rock/progressive metal band King's X, post-grunge band Silverchair, alternative bands the Presidents of the United States of America, Goo Goo Dolls, Primus, Everclear, Muse, and Eve 6, pop punk bands such as Green Day, Blink-182, Alkaline Trio and MxPx, and Argentine rock bands like Soda Stereo, Divididos, A.N.I.M.A.L., and From Power Project. Also, by the 1990s, rock trios began to form around different instrumentation, from the band Morphine, featuring a baritone saxophone instead of an electric guitar, to Ben Folds Five's replacing the guitar with various keyboards, principally the piano.

== See also ==
- List of power trios
- Organ trio: a three-person soul jazz or jam band group centred on the Hammond organ
