= Budgie (band) =

Welsh rock band

- Budgie in 1974; left to right: Pete Boot, Tony Bourge, Burke Shelley.

Background information
- Origin: Cardiff, Wales
- Genres: Heavy metal; hard rock
- Years active: 1967–1988; 1995–1996; 1999–2010
- Labels: MCA; A&M; RCA; NPL
- Spinoffs: Tredegar
- Past members: Burke Shelley; Steve Williams; Craig Goldy; Tony Bourge; Ray Phillips; Pete Boot; Rob Kendrick; John "Big" Thomas; Duncan Mackay; Jim Simpson; Robert "Congo" Jones; Andy Hart; Simon Lees; Huw Lloyd-Langton
- Website: budgie.uk.com

Budgie were a Welsh heavy metal band from Cardiff. The band formed in 1967, and recorded a demo the following year. Bass player and lead vocalist Burke Shelley was the only permanent member of the band throughout their history. Original guitarist Tony Bourge left the band in 1978 following the release of their seventh album.

In 1971, their first album was blues-oriented hard rock / heavy metal and produced by Rodger Bain, released by MCA. Later records found Budgie gradually moving into a harder and more aggressive sound. The band, usually a classic power trio with the occasional keyboard player, released ten albums, with MCA, A&M, and RCA, between 1971 and 1982, attracting a fair number of fans and achieving modest commercial success.

Budgie were one of the earliest heavy metal bands, and according to Garry Sharpe-Young they influenced many acts of that scene, particularly the new wave of British heavy metal, and later acts such as Metallica. The band have been noted as "among the heaviest metal of its day".

== History ==
Budgie formed in 1967 in Cardiff, Wales, under the name Hills Contemporary Grass. The original line-up consisted of Burke Shelley on vocals and bass, Tony Bourge on guitar and vocals and Ray Phillips on drums. After performing several gigs in 1968, the band changed their name to Budgie the following year and recorded their first demo. The band had initially considered going under the name "Six Ton Budgie", but decided the shorter single word variant was preferable. Burke Shelley has said that the band's name came from the fact that he "loved the idea of playing noisy, heavy rock, but calling ourselves after something diametrically opposed to that".

Their eponymous debut album of strong, blues-oriented hard rock was recorded at Rockfield Studios with Black Sabbath producer Rodger Bain and released in 1971. It was followed by Squawk in 1972. The third album, Never Turn Your Back on a Friend (1973), contained "Breadfan", which was covered by Metallica in 1987. Metallica had also previously covered another Budgie song, "Crash Course in Brain Surgery". Ray Phillips left the band before the fourth album In for the Kill! was recorded. He was replaced by Pete Boot.

In late 1974, Boot left and was replaced by Steve Williams for the album Bandolier. For concerts promoting this album and the follow-up, If I Were Brittania I'd Waive the Rules, the band were augmented by second guitarist Myf Isaac. Music from the 1978 LP Impeckable featured in the 1979 film J-Men Forever. Bourge and Isaac left in 1978 and were replaced by ex-Trapeze guitarist Robert Kendrick and ex-Hawkwind guitarist Huw Lloyd-Langton. Langton's stint was short-lived as Kendrick convinced the band to dismiss him. In late 1978, having been dropped by A&M and with no recording contract, this line-up floundered, and after 12 months Kendrick was replaced by "Big" John Thomas (b. 21 February 1952) in late 1979. This line-up recorded two albums for Kingsley Ward's 'Active' label: Power Supply (1980) and Nightflight (1981). In 1982 they signed to RCA for Deliver Us from Evil, their final recording for a major label.

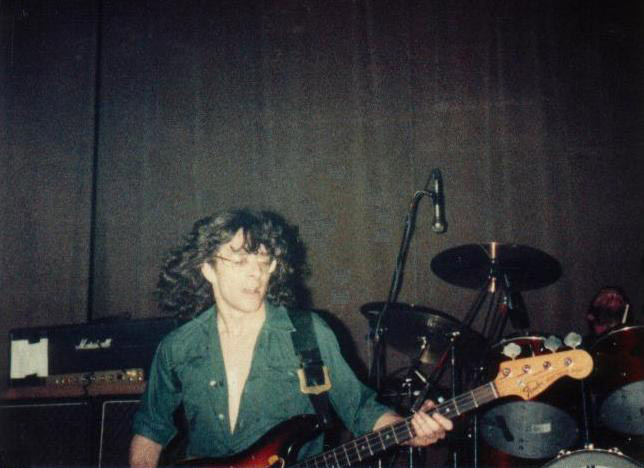
Burke Shelley and Steve Williams performing in Mountain Ash in 1981

The band continued to have success during the new wave of British heavy metal period, playing the Reading Festival in 1980 and then headlining the festival in 1982. They built a particular following in Poland, where they played as the first heavy metal band behind the Iron Curtain, in 1982. Also notable was their tour in support of Ozzy Osbourne's Blizzard of Ozz Tour.

The band stopped gigging in 1987. Members went into studio production, occasionally guesting on other projects; Thomas most notably worked on the Phenomena CD with Glenn Hughes.

Although the group had little commercial success in America, they have enjoyed a strong cult following in Texas, They toured in 2002–2006, mostly in the United Kingdom, and with a few shows in Europe including the Sweden Rock Festival and a return to Poland. In 2006, Budgie undertook a 35-date UK tour and released the album You're All Living in Cuckooland on 7 November. In 2007 they played in Sweden and Poland.

On 4 July 2007, Lees announced his departure from the band to concentrate on teaching and a solo career. Following the departure of Lees, Dio lead guitarist and songwriter Craig Goldy offered his services while Ronnie James Dio was completing commitments with Heaven & Hell. In February 2008, Craig Goldy accompanied Budgie on their first tour of Australia, and continued playing with the band as guest guitarist for all their shows.

Budgie's November 2010 tour of Central Europe had to be cancelled as Shelley was hospitalised on 9 November in Wejherowo, Poland, with an aortic aneurysm. After surgery, he returned to the UK for recovery. This was effectively the end of the band.

On 3 March 2016, former guitarist John Thomas died at the age of 63 after being admitted to hospital with pneumonia. The news of his death was confirmed by drummer Steve Williams on Facebook: "My friend and fellow BUDGIE band member John Thomas sadly passed away last night. My thoughts are with the loved ones he left behind."

In February 2018, former drummer Pete Boot died at the age of 67. For many years he had been coping with Parkinson's disease.

In April 2018, founder member and original drummer Ray Phillips published his autobiography.

After more than a decade of health issues, including an aortic aneurysm and Stickler syndrome, Shelley died on 10 January 2022, at the age of 71.

== Musical style and legacy ==
Budgie are best known as a hard rock and heavy metal band who incorporated elements of progressive rock and humour into their musical style. With 1975's Bandolier, they began to also incorporate funk.

Budgie's music was described in the All-Music Guide as a cross between Rush and Black Sabbath. Burke Shelley's vocals have been compared to Geddy Lee due to his similar approach of high-pitched banshee wails. Although Budgie remained quite obscure during their early career, many future stars of hard rock/metal have cited them as an important influence and covered their songs, including Iron Maiden, Metallica, Megadeth, Van Halen, Melvins, Queens of the Stone Age, Alice in Chains, and Soundgarden.

Metallica released a cover of "Breadfan" in September 1988 as a B-side to their "Harvester of Sorrow" single. It was later included on their 1998 album Garage Inc., and was also used as an encore during their 1988–1989 tour supporting their ...And Justice for All album. A live video version is present on the Live Shit: Binge & Purge boxed set, taken from their Seattle concerts on 29 and 30 August 1989 where it was performed in the second encore. It was also played with frequency during the Madly in Anger with the World Tour and World Magnetic Tour. A short clip of "Breadfan" is played at the beginning of the "Whiskey in the Jar" music video. They also covered "Crash Course in Brain Surgery" on the Garage Days Re-Revisited EP, which later appeared on the aforementioned Garage, Inc. album.

== Members ==
Final lineup

- Burke Shelley – lead vocals, bass (1967–1988, 1995–1996, 1999–2010; died 2022)
- Steve Williams – drums, percussion, backing vocals (1974–1986, 1999–2010)
- Craig Goldy – guitar (2008–2010)

== Discography ==
=== Studio albums ===
Year	Album	UK	AUS
1971	Budgie	–	36
1972	Squawk	–	–
1973	Never Turn Your Back on a Friend	–	–
1974	In for the Kill!	29	–
1975	Bandolier	36	75
1976	If I Were Brittania I'd Waive the Rules	–	98
1978	Impeckable	–	–
1980	Power Supply	–	–
1981	Nightflight	68	–
1982	Deliver Us from Evil	62	–
2006	You're All Living in Cuckooland	–	–

=== Live albums ===
Year	Album
1997	We Came, We Saw... (live compilation of 1980–1982 material)
1998	Heavier Than Air – Rarest Eggs (live compilation of 1972–1981 material)
2002	Life in San Antonio
2004	The BBC Recordings (live compilation of 1972–1982 material)
2005	Radio Sessions 1974 & 1978 (double album)
2020	Live in Los Angeles (live recording from a concert in 1978)
2022	Live Flight (live recording from a concert in 1979)

=== Compilation albums ===
Year	Album
1975	Best of Budgie
1981	Best of Budgie
1996	An Ecstasy of Fumbling – The Definitive Anthology
1997	Best of Budgie
2004	The Last Stage
2026	The Singles Collection

=== EPs ===
- If Swallowed, Do Not Induce Vomiting (1980, Active BUDGE 1)

=== Singles (UK-exclusive unless stated otherwise) ===
- "Crash Course in Brain Surgery" / "Nude Disintegrating Parachutist Woman" (1971, MCA MK 5072)
- "Whiskey River" / "Guts" (1972, MCA MK 5085)
- "Whiskey River" / "Stranded" (1972, MCA 2185) – US-exclusive release
- "Zoom Club (Edit)" / "Wondering What Everyone Knows" (1974, MCA 133)
- "I Ain't No Mountain" / "Honey" (1975, MCA 175)
- "Smile Boy Smile" / "All at Sea" (1978, A&M AMS 7342)
- "Crime Against the World" / "Hellbender" (1980, Active BUDGE 2)
- "Keeping a Rendezvous" / "Apparatus" (1981, RCA BUDGE 3) – UK No. 71
- "I Turned to Stone (Part 1)" / "I Turned to Stone (Part 2)" (1981, RCA BUDGE 4)
- "I Turned to Stone" / "She Used Me Up" (1981, Tonpress S-445) – Polish release
- "Bored with Russia" / "Don't Cry" (1982, RCA 271)

== Music Videos ==
- "Breadfan" (1973)
- "Pyramids"(1978)
