= The BBC Recordings (Budgie album) =

Live album by Budgie
- Released: 2004
- Recorded: 1972, 1976, 1980, 1981, 1982
- Genre: Rock
- Producer: Budgie

Budgie chronology
Heavier Than Air – Rarest Eggs (1998)	The BBC Recordings (2004)	Radio Sessions 1974 & 1978 (2005)

Professional ratings
Review scores
Source	Rating
Allmusic	3.5/5 stars

The BBC Recordings is live compilation album by Welsh rock band Budgie. The tracks on this album were taken from five shows.

== Track listing ==
Disc one
No.	Title	Length
1.	"Rape of the Locks"	5:49
2.	"Rocking Man"	5:40
3.	"Young Is a World"	8:36
4.	"Hot as a Docker's Armpit"	5:41
5.	"Breaking All the House Rules"	7:16
6.	"Crime Against the World"	5:38
7.	"Napoleon Bona-Parts 1 & 2"	7:49
8.	"Forearm Smash"	5:43
9.	"Panzer Division Destroyed"	6:16
10.	"Wild Fire"	6:07
11.	"Breadfan" (lost edit, not transmitted)	6:59

Disc two
No.	Title	Length
1.	"Sky High Percentage"	5:39
2.	"In the Grip of a Tyrefitter's Hand"	5:45
3.	"I Turned to Stone"	6:09
4.	"Superstar"	3:53
5.	"She Used Me Up"	3:09
6.	"Forearm Smash"	7:06
7.	"Crime Against the World"	5:18
8.	"I Turned to Stone"	6:16
9.	"Truth Drug" (not transmitted)	4:45
10.	"Superstar"	4:24
11.	"She Used Me Up"	3:31
12.	"Panzer Division Destroyed"	6:48

- Disc one, tracks 1–4 recorded at Paris Theatre in London, 19 October 1972.
- Disc one, tracks 5–11 recorded at the Reading Festival, 1980.
- Disc two, tracks 1–2 recorded on the John Peel Show, 1 July 1976.
- Disc two, tracks 3–5 recorded on the Friday Rock Show, 18 December 1981.
- Disc two, tracks 6–12 recorded at the Reading Festival, 1982.

== Personnel ==
Budgie

- Burke Shelley - bass, vocals
- Tony Bourge - guitar
- John Thomas - guitar
- Steve Williams - drums
- Ray Phillips - drums
