= Rodger Bain =

British record producer (born 1945)

- Born: November 1945 (age 80)
- Origin: United Kingdom
- Genres: Rock
- Occupations: Record producer
- Label: Vertigo Records

Rodger Bain (born November 1945) is a British record producer, known for producing albums by heavy metal bands such as Black Sabbath, Budgie and Judas Priest in the 1970s. He was staff producer at Vertigo Records in the early-to-mid-1970s.

== Career ==
He was the producer of Black Sabbath's first three albums, Budgie's first two albums, Judas Priest's first album, Rocka Rolla and Wild Turkey's debut album Battle Hymn. Bain dominated the production of Priest's first album and made decisions the band did not agree with, such as leaving fan favourites like "Tyrant", "Genocide" and "The Ripper" off the album. He also cut the song "Caviar and Meths" from a 10-minute song down to a two-minute instrumental.

He also produced the Judas Priest album Hero, Hero (an album not authorised by the band who, in their split with Gull Records, had had to concede the original recordings of their first albums to them, although they retained the rights to the songs), which contained remixed versions of the tracks on Rocka Rolla. Both of these Judas Priest albums received a great deal of criticism. On Black Sabbath's self-titled debut album, Bain played the Jew's harp on the track "Sleeping Village". In the Last Supper DVD, Black Sabbath bassist Geezer Butler describes Bain positively and claims that he let them record their first album live which was, and still is, an uncommon method of recording, when other producers had refused. This is also how he is said to have produced other albums he worked on. Bain subsequently went on to work with Barclay James Harvest, producing their first two albums for Polydor : Everyone Is Everybody Else (1974) and Barclay James Harvest Live. Although he reportedly did not get on with the band, the albums are highly regarded. AllMusic noted that Bain seemingly left the music industry in the mid-1970s.

However in 1981, Bain briefly returned and formed his own record label called Blue Chip/Cygnet Records and signed bands such as The Kicks, releasing their single "If Looks Could Kill" in 1982.
