= Ray Phillips (musician) =

Welsh drummer

- Born: Raymond Anthony Phillips
- Genres: Heavy metal, hard rock
- Occupation: Drummer
- Years active: 1967-present

Raymond Anthony Phillips is a Welsh drummer, best known as the original drummer for the rock band Budgie. He left the band in November 1973.

Phillips formed his own band in the mid-1970s known as Ray Phillips. When former Budgie guitarist Tony Bourge joined the band in the early 1980s, they became known as simply Woman. In 1982 he rejoined Bourge and formed Tredegar.

In the 1990s, Phillips founded another band, Six Ton Budgie, alongside his son Justin Phillips on guitar and ex-Tredegar bassist Tom Prince on bass. Phillips played drums but also took over on lead vocals. The band toured the UK extensively for the next few years before Phillips took a break from music to look after his father.

His solo album, Judgement Day, was released in May 2011 and he began touring again as the Ray Phillips Band with Tom Prince (again) and guitarist Adam Healy. He published his autobiography in April 2018.
