= Burke Shelley =

Welsh bassist and singer (1950–2022)

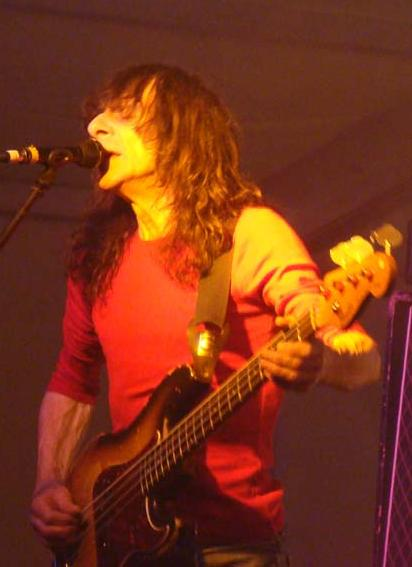
- Shelley in 2009

Background information
- Born: John Burke Shelley; 10 April 1950; Cardiff, Wales
- Died: 10 January 2022 (aged 71) Heath, Cardiff, Wales
- Genres: Hard rock; heavy metal
- Occupations: Musician; singer; songwriter
- Instruments: Bass; vocals
- Years active: 1967–2022

John Burke Shelley (10 April 1950 – 10 January 2022) was a Welsh musician, best known as the lead vocalist and bassist of the early heavy metal band Budgie.

== Musical career ==
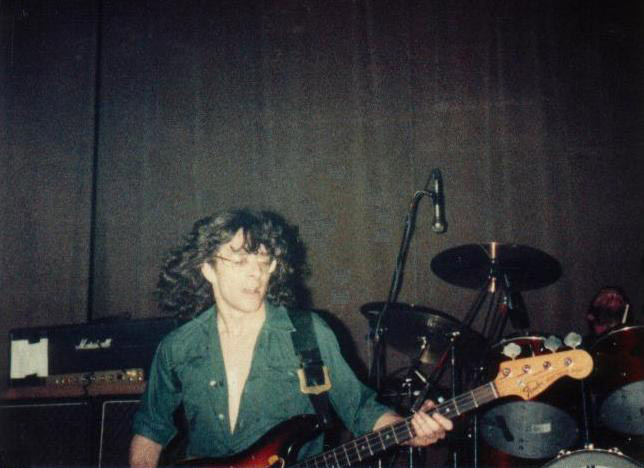
Shelley with Budgie in 1981

In 1967, Cardiff-born Shelley co-founded the band Hills Contemporary Grass with Tony Bourge on guitar and vocals and Ray Phillips on drums. The following year they changed their name to Budgie.

Shelley is often compared to Rush bassist/vocalist Geddy Lee, as they both share the position of bassist/vocalist in power trio bands, both have distinctive high-pitched singing voices, and during the mid- to late 1970s, they bore a striking resemblance to one another, with long, straight hair and large glasses. Both vocalists possessed a high tenor vocal range, but unlike Lee, who is a fingerstyle player, Shelley played bass with a pick. In addition to singing and playing bass for the group, Shelley also performed keyboards on Budgie's early albums, including the Mellotron on "Young Is a World" from the band's second album Squawk.

Budgie's November 2010 tour of Central Europe had to be cancelled as Shelley was hospitalised on 9 November in Wejherowo, Poland, with a 6 cm aortic aneurysm. After surgery, he returned to Britain for recovery, but no decision about the future of the band had been made. By the time of his death in 2022, Budgie were considered disbanded or on hiatus, having not performed or recorded since Shelley's hospitalisation.

== Personal life and death ==
Burke Shelley was born in Cardiff, the second child of John B. Shelley and Vera Selwood, and was one of seven children born between 1949 and 1959. Shelley was a father of four children. In a 2010 interview for the BBC documentary Heavy Metal Britannia, Shelley expressed his Christian beliefs and said he had always been uncomfortable with the occult-themed lyrics of bands such as Black Sabbath.

In the final years of his life, Shelley suffered from Stickler syndrome and, on two occasions, had an aortic aneurysm. He died in his sleep at the University Hospital of Wales in Cardiff on 10 January 2022, aged 71.
