= List of Tygers of Pan Tang members =

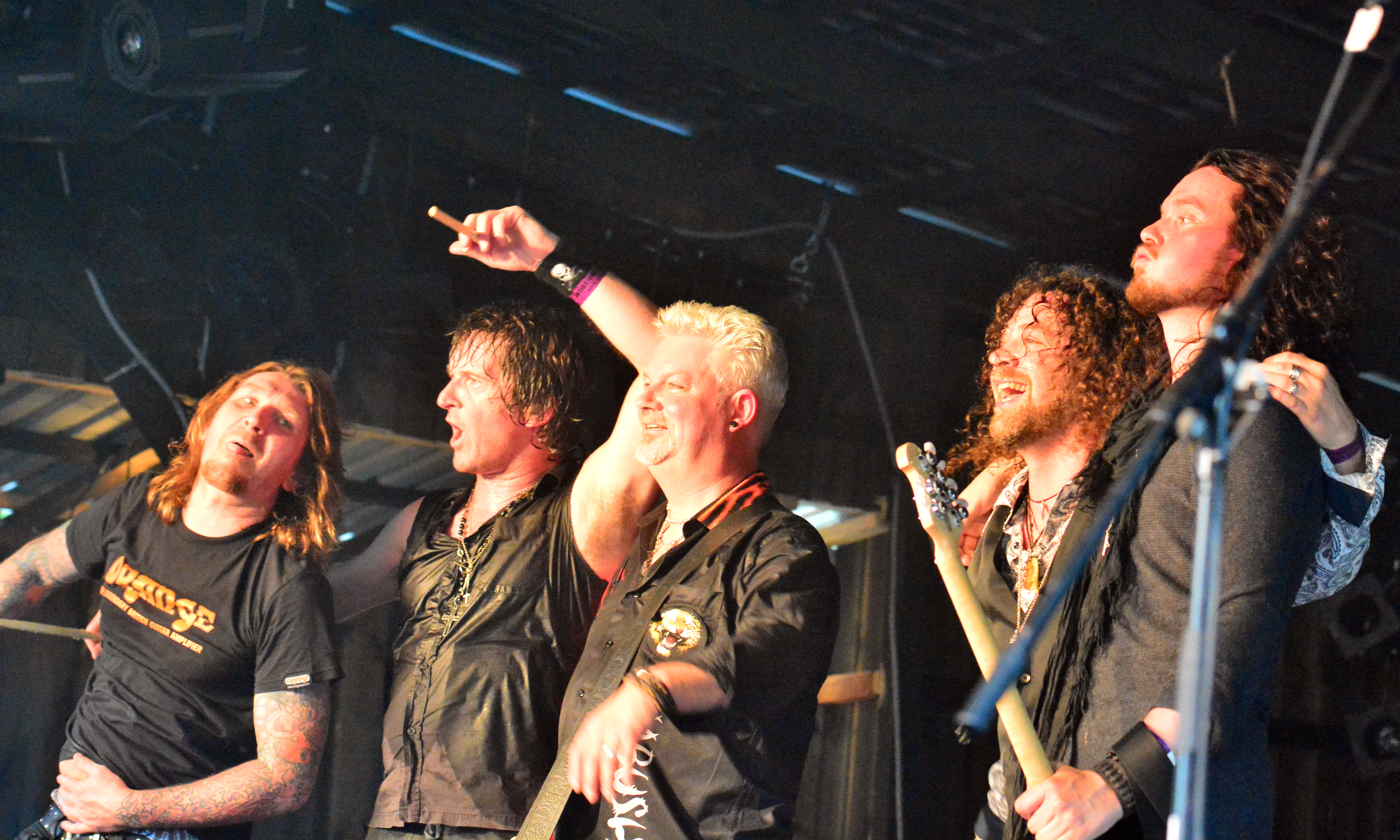
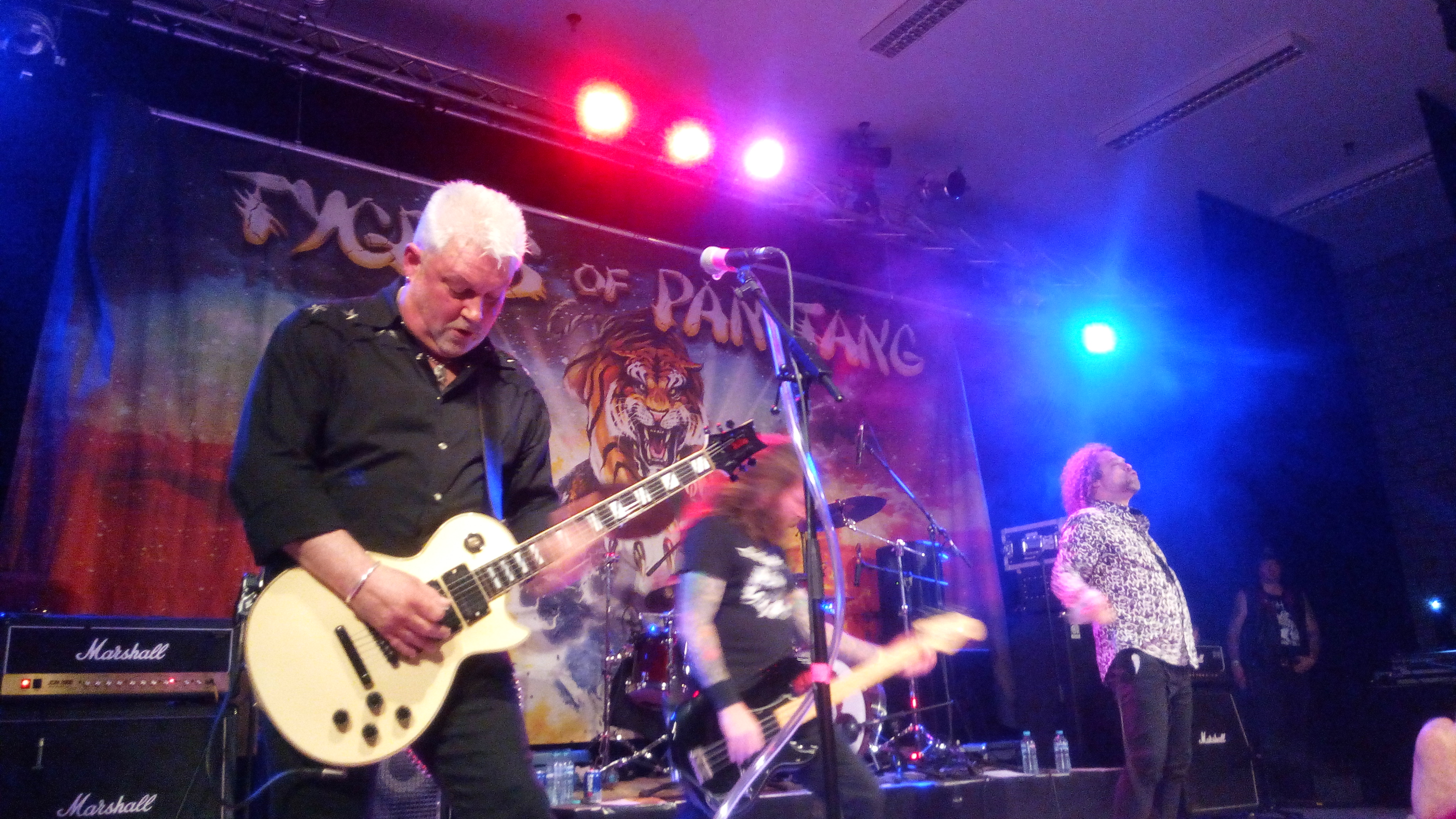
A former lineup of Tygers of Pan Tang in 2014 (top) and 2018 (bottom).

Tygers of Pan Tang (TOPT) are an English heavy metal band from Whitley Bay, North Tyneside. Formed in 1978, the group originally featured lead vocalist Mark Butcher who was replaced by Jess Cox, guitarist and backing vocalist Robb Weir, bassist and backing vocalist Richard "Rocky" Laws, and drummer Brian "Big" Dick. The group's current lineup includes Weir, drummer Craig Ellis (since 2000), vocalist Jacopo "Jack" Meille (since 2004) and bassist Huw Holding (since 2021). Jess Cox formed "Jess Cox's Tygers of Pan Tang" in 2015 and has featured members of Blitzkrieg.

== History ==
=== 1978–1987 ===
TOPT were formed in 1978 by Robb Weir, Rocky Laws and Brian Dick, who added Mark Butcher after Weir briefly considered performing lead vocals. He was replaced before the end of the month by Jess Cox. During the recording of their debut album Wild Cat, the band decided to add a second guitarist, and after several auditions brought in John Sykes. After the album's promotional tour ended in October 1980, Cox suddenly left. He was replaced the following month by Jon Deverill. The new lineup released Spellbound and Crazy Nights in 1981, before Sykes left to join Thin Lizzy and was replaced by former Penetration guitarist Fred Purser. Shortly after issuing The Cage in 1982, TOPT were dropped by MCA Records, and before the end of the year the group had disbanded.

In 1985, Deverill and Dick reformed TOPT with new members Steve Lamb, Neil Sheperd (both guitars) and Colin Irwin (bass), the latter of whom was soon replaced by Dave Donaldson in time for the recording of comeback album The Wreck-Age. Lamb had recently been a member of Robb Weir's band Sergeant, while both Sheperd and Donaldson had worked with former TOPT frontman Jess Cox in recent years. For the 1987 follow-up Burning in the Shade, Deverill, Lamb and Dick worked with songwriter Steve Thompson as a guest contributor, before breaking up for a second time.

=== 1999 onwards ===
Jess Cox and Robb Weir reunited at Wacken Open Air festival in August 1999 to mark the 20th anniversary of the release of TOPT's first single "Don't Touch Me There", adding Blitzkrieg members Glenn S. Howes on guitar, Gavin Gray on bass and Chris Percy on drums. This led to a full reformation of the band the following year, with sole original member Weir joined by new vocalist Tony Liddell, guitarist Dean Robertson, bassist Brian West and drummer Craig Ellis. Shortly after the release of Mystical, the band's first studio album since 1987, Liddell was replaced by Angel Witch bassist Richie Wicks. The new vocalist remained until October 2004, recording Noises from the Cathouse before leaving due to "ongoing work commitments". Italian singer Jacopo Meille took over in December.

After releasing Animal Instinct in 2008, followed by a series of re-recordings of earlier material, West officially departed in November 2011 to focus on his duties as bass technician for Uriah Heep, with Gavin Gray returning to take his place. Ambush followed in 2012, before Robertson left at the beginning of 2013 to focus on other projects. He was replaced by Micky Crystal. In 2015 Jess Cox formed “Jess Cox’s Tygers of Pan Tang” and made festival appearances across Europe as well as a tour of South America. The Micky Crystal era saw the band release two albums, the critically acclaimed “Tygers of Pan Tang” and the album which is regarded as the post 2000’s jewel in the crown “Ritual.” Crystal’s guitar playing and songwriting were widely credited between critics and fans as restoring the signature guitar fireworks missing since the John Sykes era.

Micky Crystal left the band in March 2020, claiming poor management and lack of democracy led to the decision referencing a 1984 John Sykes interview with Kerrang which claimed similar. He was followed by Gavin Gray in July 2021. Their replacements have been Francesco Marras and Huw Howlding (also ex-Blitzkrieg) respectively. Marras continued the fretboard fireworks and made one studio album “Bloodlines” with the band. Marras left the band in November 2025. In January 2026 the band announced John Foottit as their new guitarist. Footitt appears on a few tracks on the album Electrifyed alongside producer Marco Angioni.

== Members ==
=== Current ===
Image	Name	Years active	Instruments	Release contributions
	Robb Weir	1978–1982; 1999–present	guitar; backing vocals	all releases, except The Wreck-Age (1985) and Burning in the Shade (1987)
	Craig Ellis	2000–present	drums; percussion; backing vocals	all releases from Mystical (2001) onwards except A New Heartbeat (2022)
	Jacopo "Jack" Meille	2004–present	lead vocals	all releases from Animal Instinct (2008) onwards
	Huw Holding	2021–present	bass	all releases from Bloodlines (2023) onwards
	John Foottit	2026–present	guitar	none to date

=== Former ===
Image	Name	Years active	Instruments	Release contributions
	Brian "Big" Dick	1978–1982; 1985–1987	drums; percussion	all releases from Wild Cat (1980) to First Kill (1992); Live at Nottingham Rock City (2001)
	Richard "Rocky" Laws	1978–1982	bass; backing vocals	all releases from Wild Cat (1980) to The Cage (1982); First Kill (1992); Live at Nottingham Rock City (2001)
	Mark Butcher	1978	lead vocals	none – live performances only
	Jess Cox	1978–1980; 1999	lead vocals	Wild Cat (1980); "Rock n' Roll Man" (1980); First Kill (1992); Live at Wacken (2001)
	John Sykes	1980–1982 (died 2025)	guitar; backing vocals	Spellbound (1981); "Don't Take Nothing" (1981); Crazy Nights (1981); The Cage (1982) – two tracks only; Live at Nottingham Rock City (2001)
	Jon Deverill	1980–1982; 1985–1987	lead vocals	all releases from Spellbound (1981) to Burning in the Shade (1987); Live at Nottingham Rock City (2001)
	Fred Purser	1982	guitar; keyboards; backing vocals	The Cage (1982)
	Steve Lamb	1985–1987	guitar; backing vocals	The Wreck-Age (1985); Burning in the Shade (1987)
	Neil Sheperd	1985–1987	guitar	The Wreck-Age (1985)
	Colin Irwin	1985	bass	none – rehearsals only
	Dave Donaldson	1985–1987	bass; backing vocals	The Wreck-Age (1985)
	Gavin Gray	1999 (one-off); 2011–2021	bass; backing vocals	Live at Wacken (2001); all TOPT releases from Ambush (2012) to Ritual (2019)
	Chris Percy	1999 (one-off)	drums	Live at Wacken (2001)
	Glenn S. Howes	1999 (one-off)	guitar	Live at Wacken (2001)
	Dean Robertson	2000–2013	guitar	all releases from Mystical (2001) to Ambush (2012)
	Brian West	2000–2011	bass	all releases from Mystical (2001) to The Spellbound Sessions (2011)
	Tony Liddell	2000–2001	lead vocals	Mystical (2001)
	Richie Wicks	2001–2004	lead vocals	Live in the Roar (2003); Noises from the Cathouse (2004); Live in Holland (2005)
	Michael "Micky" Crystal	2013–2020	guitar; backing vocals	The Crazy Nights Sessions (2014); Tygers of Pan Tang (2016); Ritual (2019)
	Francesco Marras	2020–2025	guitar; backing vocals	Bloodlines (2023)

== Lineups ==
Period	Members	Releases
Early – August 1978	Mark Butcher – lead vocals; Robb Weir – guitar, backing vocals; Rocky Laws – bass, backing vocals; Brian Dick – drums, percussion	none – live performances only
August 1978 – July 1980	Robb Weir – guitar, backing vocals; Rocky Laws – bass, backing vocals; Brian Dick – drums, percussion; Jess Cox – lead vocals	Wild Cat (1980); "Rock n' Roll Man" (1980); First Kill (1992)
July – October 1980	Robb Weir – guitar, backing vocals; Rocky Laws – bass, backing vocals; Brian Dick – drums, percussion; Jess Cox – lead vocals; John Sykes – guitar, backing vocals	none – live performances only
November 1980 – April 1982	Robb Weir – guitar, backing vocals; Rocky Laws – bass, backing vocals; Brian Dick – drums, percussion; John Sykes – guitar, backing vocals; Jon Deverill – lead vocals	Spellbound (1981); "Don't Take Nothing" (1981); Crazy Nights (1981); The Cage (1982) – two tracks only
April – November 1982	Robb Weir – guitar, backing vocals; Rocky Laws – bass, backing vocals; Brian Dick – drums, percussion; Jon Deverill – lead vocals; Fred Purser – guitar, backing vocals	The Cage (1982) – remaining tracks
Band inactive November 1982 – early 1985
Early 1985	Brian Dick – drums, percussion; Jon Deverill – lead vocals; Steve Lamb – guitar, backing vocals; Neil Sheperd – guitar; Colin Irwin – bass	none – rehearsals only
1985–1987	Brian Dick – drums, percussion; Jon Deverill – lead vocals; Steve Lamb – guitar, backing vocals; Neil Sheperd – guitar; Dave Donaldson – bass, backing vocals	The Wreck-Age (1985)
1987	Brian Dick – drums, percussion; Jon Deverill – lead vocals; Steve Lamb – guitar, backing vocals	Burning in the Shade (1987)
Band inactive 1987–1999
August 1999 (Wacken Open Air)	Robb Weir – guitar, backing vocals; Jess Cox – lead vocals; Glenn S. Howes – guitar; Gavin Gray – bass, backing vocals; Chris Percy – drums	Live at Wacken (2001)
2000 – November 2001	Robb Weir – guitar, backing vocals; Tony Liddell – vocals; Dean Robertson – guitar; Brian West – bass; Craig Ellis – drums, percussion, backing vocals	Mystical (2001)
November 2001 – October 2004	Robb Weir – guitar, backing vocals; Dean Robertson – guitar; Brian West – bass; Craig Ellis – drums, percussion, backing vocals; Richie Wicks – vocals	Live in the Roar (2003); Noises from the Cathouse (2004); Live in Holland (2005)
December 2004 – November 2011	Robb Weir – guitar, backing vocals; Dean Robertson – guitar; Brian West – bass; Craig Ellis – drums, percussion, backing vocals; Jacopo Meille – vocals	Animal Instinct (2008); Animal Instinct x2 (2009); The Wildcat Sessions (2010); The Spellbound Sessions (2011)
November 2011 – January 2013	Robb Weir – guitar, backing vocals; Dean Robertson – guitar; Craig Ellis – drums, percussion, backing vocals; Jacopo Meille – lead vocals; Gavin Gray – bass, backing vocals	Ambush (2012)
February 2013 – March 2020	Robb Weir – guitar, backing vocals; Gavin Gray – bass, backing vocals; Craig Ellis – drums, percussion, backing vocals; Jacopo Meille – lead vocals; Micky Crystal – guitar, backing vocals	The Crazy Nights Sessions (2014); Tygers of Pan Tang (2016); Ritual (2019)
October 2020 – July 2021	Robb Weir – guitar, backing vocals; Gavin Gray – bass, backing vocals; Craig Ellis – drums, percussion, backing vocals; Jacopo Meille – lead vocals; Francesco Marras – guitar, backing vocals	none – rehearsals only
August 2021 – November 2025	Robb Weir – guitar, backing vocals; Craig Ellis – drums, percussion, backing vocals; Jacopo Meille – lead vocals; Huw Howlding – bass; Francesco Marras – guitar, backing vocals	Bloodlines (2023); Live Blood (2024)
January 2026 – present	Robb Weir – guitar, backing vocals; Craig Ellis – drums, percussion, backing vocals; Jacopo Meille – lead vocals; Huw Howlding – bass; John Foottit – guitar	Electrifyed (Releases September 11th 2026)
