= The Definitive Part One =

Compilation album by Cloven Hoof
- Released: 2008
- Genre: Heavy metal
- Length: 65:00
- Label: Elemental Music
- Producer: Paul O’Neill

Cloven Hoof chronology
Eye of the Sun (2006)	The Definitive Part One (2008)	Throne of Damnation (2009)

The Definitive Part One, released in 2008], is a compilation album by British heavy metal band Cloven Hoof. Apart from one new song, "Mutilator", all of the tracks are re-recorded versions of existing Cloven Hoof songs from the past.

The drums, bass, keyboard and rhythm guitar tracks were recorded live in the studio, with vocals and guitar solos being dubbed in for a cleaner finish. Guitarist/keyboardist Mick Powell was still a part of the band's lineup when this album was recorded, but had left by the time of release and is credited as a guest musician.

== Track listing ==
1. Inquisitor - 5:22 (originally from Eye of the Sun)
2. Nova Battlestar - 6:02 (originally from Dominator)
3. The Gates of Gehenna - 4:48 (originally from The Opening Ritual)
4. Astral Rider - 5:36 (originally from A Sultan's Ransom)
5. Kiss of Evil - 6:08 (originally from Eye of the Sun)
6. Mutilator - 5:01
7. Reach for the Sky - 5:41(originally from Fighting Back)
8. Road of Eagles - 6:21 (originally from 1982 Demo/Dominator)
9. Return of the Passover - 8:07 (originally from 1982 Demo/Cloven Hoof)
10. Laying Down the Law - 5:03 (originally from Cloven Hoof)
11. Mistress of the Forest - 6:51 (originally from A Sultan's Ransom)

== Personnel ==
- Russ North - Lead and backing vocals
- Ben Read- Guitar
- Lee Payne - Bass, backing vocals, additional keyboards and guitars
- Jon Brown - Drums

=== Guests ===
- Mick Powell - Guitar and keyboards
- Dale North - Narration vocals, Dale, aside from being the brother of Cloven Hoof's Russ North, is also a Singer/songwriter, Actor, Photographer, and author. His first feature-length film 'One Weekend', is due to be released in 2013 and co-stars Andrew Langtree from Coronation street and Emmerdale, the film was written, cast, produced, directed by, and starring Dale.
