= Cloven Hoof =

A cloven hoof is a hoof split into two toes. Cloven Hoof otherwise refers to:

- The Cloven Hoof, an early bulletin publication from the Church of Satan
- Cloven Hoof (band), a heavy metal group from Wolverhampton active since 1979
  - Cloven Hoof (album), the band's 1984 eponymous studio release
- Cloven Hooves, a 1991 fantasy novel by Megan Lindholm
- Cloven paw, a genetic abnormality in the paws of dogs and cats.
