= Conjoined paw (disambiguation) =

Conjoined paw may refer to any of the following:

== Animals ==
- Cloven paw
- Cloven hoof

== Music ==
- Cloven Hoof (band)
