= Ambush (Tygers of Pan Tang album) =

Studio album by Tygers of Pan Tang
- Released: 24 September 2012
- Genre: Heavy metal
- Length: 49:07
- Label: Rocksector Records
- Producer: Chris Tsangarides

Tygers of Pan Tang chronology
Animal Instinct (2008)	Ambush (2012)	Tygers Of Pan Tang (2016)

Ambush is the tenth studio album by British Heavy metal band Tygers of Pan Tang, released on 24 September 2012. A limited edition fan pack was also released (limited to 300) and includes the Ambush cd, Ambush guitar pick, a poster of the original album artwork signed by Rodney Matthews, and a postcard featuring song lyrics. It was housed in a high-quality cd box with a metallic Tygers Of Pan Tang band logo. As an added bonus, each buyer was entered into a free draw with the first 5 winners receiving a signed 12″ vinyl copy from the Spellbound sessions and a signed cymbal from the same sessions. The album was newly remastered and re-released again on digital services, digipack CD, black LP, and orange LP (limited to 500) versions, by Mighty Music, on 18 September 2020; It contains extensive sleeve notes from all of the band members as well as four of the added tracks from the Japan Remastered rerelease, minus the track "Suzie Smiled". This was the first album to be recorded, produced, and engineered by Chris Tsangarides in 31 years. He had last produced their first 2 albums, Wild Cat and Spellbound.

Professional ratings
Review scores
Source	Rating
Metal Kaoz	7/10 stars
PlanetMosh	9/10
Metal Rules	4.0/5
MetalCrypt	4.25/5
Metalheads Forever Magazine	8/10

== Reception ==
Reception of the album has been positive by both fans and critics. Grigoris Chronis of Metal Kaoz gave a positive review, saying that this is a rocking British Metal songlist with flaming guitars and a general on-the-road atmosphere that resembles the vintage TYGERS OF PAN TANG days, from start to finish. Ending their review by stating that "[Ambush] is the kind of album you will be glad to purchase, if you’re a fan of classic British Rock/Metal. The songwriting is nice, the guitars are blazing, the rhythm section is pounding hard, the vocals are tantalizing in a way and the overall result screams you can’t teach an old dog new tricks." Of Metal Rules, Erich Heintzelman was positive and said how that there are no glaring weaknesses on this album, and that the Guitar solos, rhythms, and arrangements are all of a high caliber. Concluding that while Ambush will not deliver the band to the glory days of yore, "it will lead many an aged metal head to crack a smile, and remember the excitement of those initial NWOBHM days. Incidentally, this album is for those aged fans of Saxon, Tokyo Blade, and Angel Witch, but also NWOBHM fans in general."

== Track listing ==
No.	Title	Length
1.	"Keeping Me Alive"	5:27
2.	"These Eyes"	4:10
3.	"One of a Kind"	4:14
4.	"Rock 'n' Roll Dream"	4:07
5.	"She"	4:49
6.	"Man On Fire"	4:10
7.	"Play To Win"	4:51
8.	"Burning Desire"	4:56
9.	"Hey Suzie"	4:18
10.	"Mr. Indispensable"	4:23
11.	"Speed"	3:42

Remastered reissue bonus tracks
No.	Title	Length
12.	"Cruel Hands of Time" (Studio Outtake)	4:02
13.	"Keeping Me Alive" (Live)	4:12
14.	"These Eyes" (Live)	5:08
15.	"Rock'n'Roll Dream" (Demo)	4:30

Japanese Reissue bonus track
No.	Title	Length
16.	"Suzie Smiled" (Live)	5:53

== Personnel ==
- Jacopo Meille – vocals
- Dean Robertson – lead guitar
- Robb Weir – guitars
- Gavin Gray – bass
- Craig Ellis – drums

=== Miscellaneous staff ===
- Chris Tsangarides – producer, engineering, mastering
- Rodney Matthews – cover art
- Ian Cooper – mastering
