= Persian Risk =

British heavy metal band

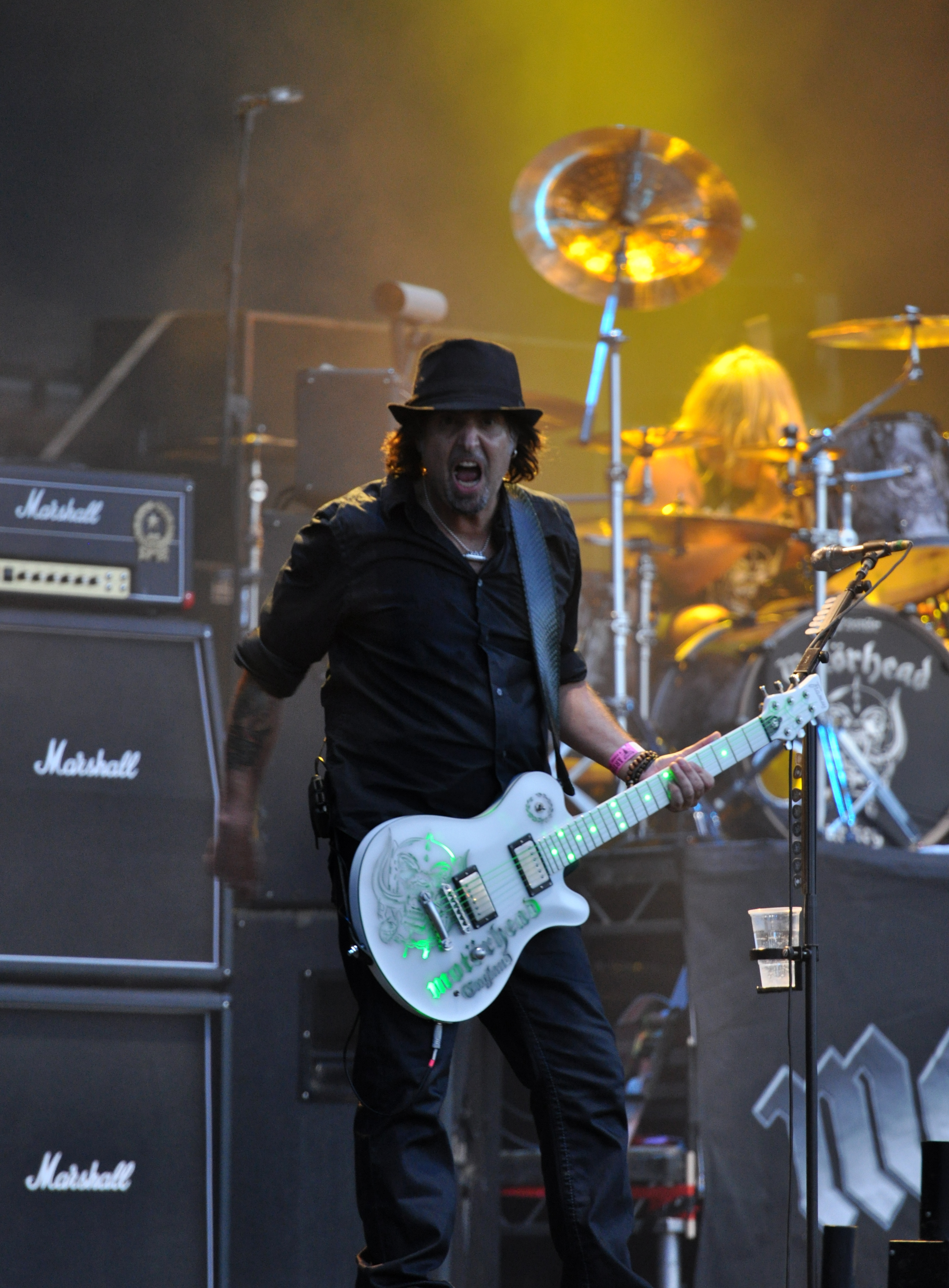
- Former guitarist Phil Campbell performing with Motörhead at Wacken Open Air 2013

Background information
- Origin: Cardiff, Wales
- Genres: Heavy metal; hard rock
- Years active: 1979–1986; 1992–1995 (US version); 2012–present
- Labels: Neat; Zebra; Metal Masters; High Vaultage; Powerage; High Roller
- Members: Carl Sentance; Howie G. Wayne Banks; Tim Brown
- Past members: Nick Hughes; Phil Campbell; Russell "Razz" Lemon; Jon Deverill; Dave Bell; Alex Lohfink; Carl Sentance; Dixie Lee; Steve Hopgood; Graham Bath; Phil Vokins

Persian Risk are a Welsh heavy metal band from the new wave of British heavy metal era formed in 1979 and hailing from Cardiff. The brainchild of ex-Stoned Soul Party guitarist Phil Campbell, he recruited vocalist Jon Deverill, second guitarist Dave Bell, bass player Nick Hughes, and drummer Razz (Russell Lemon). The group was active until 1986. In 2012, the band was re-activated by vocalist Carl Sentance albeit without the involvement of any other past members.

== History ==
In late 1980, Deverill was headhunted by the Tygers of Pan Tang and replaced by Carl Sentance, a former bandmate of Nick Hughes and Razz in Leading Star. New vocalist in place, Persian Risk issued the now highly collectible "Calling For You" b/w "Chase the Dragon" 7" single in 1981, before sacking Dave Bell's replacement, Alex Lohfink, and soldiering on as a four-piece. The band made further headway by contributing the aforementioned "Calling For You" to the "Heavy Metal Heroes Vol. 2" compilation album (Heavy Metal Records, 1982) and a new cut, "50.000 Stallions", to the 60 Minutes Plus cassette compilation (Neat Records, 1982), also issued on vinyl as All Hell Let Loose by Neat in conjunction with Italy's Base Records label in 1983. Adding to their tally, the band followed it up with the "Ridin' High" b/w "Hurt You" single through Neat, which earned Risk their strongest reviews yet.

It would turn out to be the final recording with drummer Razz who was sacked in late 1983. He was briefly superseded by Dixie Lee (ex-Lone Star, Wild Horses) before a more permanent replacement was a found in Steve Hopgood (ex-Chinatown, Shy). The band also added a new second guitarist, Graham Bath (ex-Sphinx). Persian Risk were dealt a significant blow when founding member Phil Campbell successfully auditioned for Motörhead, who would tap his old band for the support slot on their 1984 UK tour. Campbell's successor was Phil Vokins (ex-Tyrant, Wrathchild). Risk also signed a new record deal with London-based Zebra Records and issued the Too Different 12" EP in 1984 which saw the band temper their raw approach in favor of a somewhat more polished sound.

That same year, Persian Risk made their one and only national UK TV appearance when the band performed three songs – "Women In Rock", "Rise Up", and "Too Different" – on Channel 4's ECT program. All three songs would later feature on their Rise Up album, which was released in 1986 on Metal Masters. By that time, the band had already disintegrated, the result of mounting frustration after years of hard work and failing to get that elusive big break. Nick Hughes exited to join Idol Rich, drummer Steve Hopgood co-founded Wild! (and later joined Paul Di'Anno's Battlezone and Killers, as well as an early version of Jagged Edge), while Carl Sentance stepped in with Tokyo Blade on their 1986 European tour; he was also brought in as a guest vocalist by fellow Welsh act Tredegar for their 1986 debut album. Graham Bath, too, would later serve a stint with the DiAnno fronted Battlezone and Killers.

In February 2012, vocalist Carl Sentance announced on his Facebook page that he had recorded seven new songs, and re-cut four old Persian Risk tracks, for inclusion on a new Persian Risk album, albeit without any of the original members involved. The participation of Deep Purple keyboardist Don Airey and former Thunder bassist Chris Childs was confirmed by Sentance.

In a 29 July 2012 posting on the band's Facebook page, an August release was announced for the new album, entitled Once A King. On it, Sentance, Airey and Childs are joined by bassist Alex Meadows, drummer Tim Brown and the guitar duo of Danny Willson and Howie G. The above-mentioned album was released in October 2012; a limited edition vinyl version was issued by German label High Roller Records.

The new Persian Risk played the "Hard Rock Hell" festival in Wales on 29 November 2012, with a line-up consisting of Sentance, Brown, Howie G. and former Blaze bassist Wayne Banks. They are also scheduled to appear at the "Keep It True" festival in Germany in April 2014. Their third album, named Who Am I?, was released on 6 November 2014.

== Post break-up activities ==
- Carl Sentance was recruited by Black Sabbath bassist Geezer Butler to front the Geezer Butler Band in 1986. In 1990, he was sought out by Welsh guitarist Paul Chapman of Lone Star, UFO, and Waysted fame to front a new band, Ghost, in Orlando, Florida. Sentance also assembled an American version of Persian Risk with guitarist Mark Lanoue; the band gigged in the Southern US area until their demise in 1995. Back in the UK, the singer was involved in a project with members of Wraith before being asked to front legendary Swiss hard rockers Krokus in 1998; he appeared on their Round 13 album and stayed on for the next three years. In 2005, Sentance emerged fronting Whole Lotta Metal alongside co-vocalist Tony Martin of Black Sabbath fame and other British metal session musicians, assembled for a touring cast of cover versions. The singer also served as the voice for the Power Project who issued the Dinosaurs album in 2006. It featured Sentance and veteran US musicians Carlos Cavazo (Quiet Riot, Ratt), Jeff Pilson (Dokken, Dio, Foreigner), and Vinny Appice (Black Sabbath, Dio). On the live front, the singer teamed up with Deep Purple's Don Airey & Friends and can also be heard on Airey's 2008 solo effort, A Light in the Sky. Sentance issued his debut solo album, Mind Doctor, in 2008; musical guests include Airey on keyboards and the Thunder rhythm section of Harry James and Chris Childs. Sentance became the lead vocalist for Nazareth in 2015.
- Steve Hopgood was seen in a late 1990s incarnation of Tank who released The Return of the Filth Hounds – Live album in 1998 and toured Japan as part of a 20th Anniversary NWOBHM festival billing, documented on the Metal Crusade '99 split CD, which also features Samson, Trespass, and Praying Mantis.
- Phil Vokins returned in 2006 with Psychowrath, a union with fellow ex-Wrathchild members, bassist Marc Angel and drummer Eddie Starr, and Beyond Recognition vocalist Gaz Harris. The band is still active and playing shows.
- Nick Hughes has re-emerged in recent years as a DJ and producer in Trance music circles under the pseudonym Toad. He is also involved in the promoting side of things with 'Toadstool', a psytrance party based in Gloucester, UK where he acts as resident DJ.
- Jon Deverill left the rock music world behind after a final pair of Tygers of Pan Tang albums, The Wreck-Age and Burning in the Shade, in the late 1980s and now works as a successful stage actor. A graduate of the Royal Welsh College of Music and Drama in Cardiff, Deverill, stage name: Jon de Ville, most recently appeared in a national tour of Blood Brothers in 2007 and The Sound of Music in London in 2008. An album Deverill originally began recording in the mid-80s with fellow former Tyger Fred Purser under the name of Square World remained in the vaults until its December 2018 release on Mighty Music under the name Purser Deverill – Square One.
- Phil Campbell would remain a member of Motörhead for 31 years, recording sixteen studio albums with the band. In 2004, Campbell made 'The 100 Welsh Heroes' list as a result of Wales' largest ever online poll, conducted by Culturenet Cymru. Campbell also won a prestigious Grammy Award with Motörhead in the Best Metal Performance category for their cover of Metallica's "Whiplash" in 2005. He toured and recorded with Phil Campbell and the Bastard Sons.

== Members ==
=== Current members ===
- Carl Sentance: lead vocals (1980–1986, 2012–present)
- Jason Banks: guitars (2014–present)
- Wayne Banks: bass (2012–present)
- Tim Brown: drums (2012–present)

=== Former members ===
- John Deverill lead vocals (1979–1980)
- Dave Bell: guitars (1979–1980)
- Razz: drums (1979–1983)
- Phil Campbell: guitars (1979–1984)
- Nick Hughes: bass (1979–1986)
- Alex Lohfink: guitars (1980–1981)
- Dixie Lee: drums (1983–1984)
- Graham Bath: guitars (1983–1986)
- Phil Vokins: guitars (1984–1986)
- Steve Hopgood: drums, percussion (1984–1986)
- Lou Taylor: lead vocals (1986)
- Chris Childs: bass (2012)
- Alex Meadows: bass (2012)
- Danny Willson: guitars (2012)
- Howard "Howie G" Jarrett: guitars (2012–2014)

Persian Risk USA lineup (active briefly from 1992–1995):

- Fred Wendal: drums (1992)
- Carl Sentance: lead vocals (1992–1995)
- Mark Allen Lanoue: guitars (1992–1995)
- Jeff Laroche: guitars (1992–1995)
- Tom Neely: bass (1992–1995)
- Tommy Rodriquez: drums (1992–1995)

== Discography ==
=== Singles ===
- "Calling for You" b/w "Chase the Dragon" (SRT Records, 1981)
- "Ridin' High" b/w "Hurt You" (Neat Records, 1983)
- "Too Different" 12" EP (Zebra Records, 1984)

=== Albums ===
- Rise Up (Metal Masters, 1986 / High Vaultage, 1997 / Powerage, 2002)

01. "Hold the Line"
02. "Jane" featuring Didge Digital on keyboards
03. "Rise Up"
04. "Brave New World"
05. "Don't Turn Around"
06. "Sky's Falling Down"
07. "Break Free"
08. "Dark Tower"
09. "Rip It Up"
10. "Women in Rock"

Note: The High Vaultage re-issue added the three songs from the Too Different 12" EP as bonus tracks.

- Once a King (2012)

01. "Asylum"
02. "Riding High"
03. "Killer"
04. "Once a King"
05. "Soul Deceiver"
06. "Battle Cry"
07. "Spirit in My Dreams"
08. "Ride the Storm"
09. "Fist of Fury"
10. "Women and Rock"
11. "Wasteland"

Note: "Riding High" and "Women and Rock" are re-recordings of earlier Persian Risk songs.

=== Compilations ===
- Heavy Metal Heroes Vol.2 (Heavy Metal Records, 1982)
- 60 Minutes Plus (Neat Records, 1982)
- All Hell Let Loose (Base Records/Neat, 1983)

== See also ==
- List of new wave of British heavy metal bands
