= Throne of Damnation =

EP by Cloven Hoof
- Released: 2010
- Genre: Heavy metal
- Label: Elemental Music

Cloven Hoof chronology
The Definitive Part One (2008)	Throne of Damnation (2010)

Throne of Damnation is an EP by British power metal/heavy metal band Cloven Hoof, released in 2010. It features three new songs and two are re-recordings of existing Cloven Hoof songs. Russ North recorded the vocals before he quit the band in late 2009, and his parts were subsequently re-recorded by his replacement, Matt Moreton.

== Track listing ==
1. "Running Man" – 4:12
2. "Whore of Babylon" – 4:47
3. "Freak Show" – 6:32
4. "Prime Time" – 3:57
5. "Night Stalker" –3:47

== Personnel ==
- Matt Moreton - Vocals
- Ben Read - Guitar
- Lee Payne - Bass
- Jon Brown - Drums
