= The Opening Ritual =

EP by Cloven Hoof
- Released: July 1982
- Genre: Heavy metal
- Length: 21:47
- Label: Elemental Music

Cloven Hoof chronology
The Opening Ritual (1982)	Cloven Hoof (1984)

The Opening Ritual is an EP by the British heavy metal band Cloven Hoof, and their debut release. The track in this EP, "The Gates Of Gehenna" was re-recorded by the same band for their self-titled first full-length studio album. There exists a bootleg split album of this EP and the band's live album Fighting Back.

== History ==
The EP stayed in the Sounds and Kerrang! heavy metal charts for six weeks, peaking at number 18. Articles in Kerrang! and Noise magazines followed, with Geoff Barton tipping the band for the top in his prestigious "Breaking through in '82 feature," and playlist.

Over in America, unbeknownst to the band, John Strednansky was championing the band in his Metal Rendezvous magazine, and college radio stations were airing the EP on their playlists. A worldwide buzz was growing and international stardom seemed a formality. However, bad contract advice and in-fighting put paid to a huge recording deal. The untimely death of David Hemmings, the band's manager, was another terrible blow. An independent label was the only alternative for Cloven Hoof to once again gather momentum.

Undeterred, The Opening Ritual attained airplay on numerous radio stations worldwide, but it was not until Tommy Vance and Geoff Barton played tracks off the EP on radio one in the UK that the Cloven ones' career really began to break into a gallop.

1983 saw Cloven Hoof touring throughout the length and breadth of the United Kingdom, earning themselves a sizeable underground cult following. In the summer of that year, the band recorded a four-track session for Tommy Vance's Friday Rock Show on BBC Radio 1 and a similar session for Beacon Radio for DJ Mike Davies.

== Track listing ==
All songs written by Lee Payne, unless indicted otherwise.

1. "The Gates of Gehenna" - 6:10
2. "Stormrider" - 4:17
3. "Back in the USA" - 4:40
4. "Starship Sentinel" - 6:40

== Credits ==
- David Potter - Vocals
- Steve Rounds - Guitar
- Lee Payne - Bass
- Kevin Pountney - Drums
