= Tredegar (album) =

Studio album by Tredegar
- Released: June 1986
- Recorded: Music Factory, Cardiff
- Genre: Heavy metal
- Length: 38:47
- Label: Aries
- Producer: John Wase, Ray Phillips, Andy Wood

Tredegar chronology
Tredegar (1986)	Remix & Rebirth (1994)

Professional ratings
Review scores
Source	Rating
AllMusic	4/5 stars
Collector's Guide to Heavy Metal	7/10
Kerrang!	3.5/5 stars

Tredegar is the self-titled debut album by the Welsh heavy metal band Tredegar. The vocals on all but one song on the album were recorded by guest singer Carl Sentance as the band did not have a full-time frontman in place when recording began. Russ North joined as the permanent vocalist during the recording sessions and sung on "Which Way to Go."

As part of their live set they played covers of a number of Budgie songs including "Breadfan", "Napoleon Bonapart", "Zoom Club" and "Parents".

== Track listing ==
All songs written by Ray Philips and Tony Bourge.

Side one

1. "Duma" – 3:09
2. "The Alchemist" – 6:56
3. "Way of the Warrior" – 3:20
4. "Richard III" – 4:49

Side two

1. "Battle of Bosworth" – 3:29
2. "The Jester" – 3:37
3. "Which Way to Go" – 5:43
4. "Wheels" – 4:23

== Personnel ==
Tredegar

- Russ North – lead vocals on "Which Way to Go"
- Tony Bourge – lead guitar
- Andy Wood – guitar, producer
- Tom Prince – bass guitar
- Ray Phillips – drums, producer

Additional musicians

- Carl Sentance – lead vocals on all other tracks except "Which Way To Go"

Production

- John Wase – producer, engineer
