= Dominator (Cloven Hoof album) =

- Cover art by John Blanche

Studio album by Cloven Hoof
- Released: 1988
- Studio: Sinewave Studios, Birmingham, UK
- Genre: Power Metal, Heavy Metal
- Length: 41:50
- Label: FM Revolver
- Producer: Guy Bidmead

Cloven Hoof chronology
Fighting Back (1986)	Dominator (1988)	A Sultan's Ransom (1989)

Professional ratings
Review scores
Source	Rating
Collector's Guide to Heavy Metal	5/10

Dominator, released in 1988, is the second full-length studio album by the British heavy metal band Cloven Hoof. This science fiction concept album debuts singer Russ North and guitarist Andy Wood (both from Tredegar) in the band, as well as drummer Jon Brown. This album also shows Cloven Hoof's musical direction leaning more towards power metal than their previous releases. The songs "The Fugitive" and "Reach for the Sky" were previously recorded on their 1986 live album Fighting Back, and "Road of Eagles" was originally recorded on their first 1982 demo and also recorded live in studio for the BBC Rock Sessions in the mid 1980s.

This album was only officially pressed on cassette tape and vinyl. The album art is lifted from John Blanche's "Amazonia Gothique" (1986).

In 2011 the album has been digitally remastered and reissued by Metal Nations (UK record label). The CD could be pre-ordered (first 50 orders include a free sew-on patch of the album) online on the band's site.

== Track listing ==
All songs written by Lee Payne, unless indicated otherwise.

Side Alpha

1. "Rising Up" - 4:48
2. "Nova Battlestar" - 5:41
3. "Reach for the Sky" - 5:31
4. "Warrior of the Wasteland" (Payne, Andy Wood, Russ North, Jon Brown) - 5:15

Side Beta

5. "The Invaders" - 5:25
6. "The Fugitive" - 4:20
7. "Dominator" - 4:42
8. "Road of Eagles" - 6:08

== Personnel ==
Cloven Hoof

- Russ North - vocals
- Andy Wood - guitar
- Lee Payne - bass
- Jon Brown - drums

Production

- Guy Bidmead - producer
- Alan McKerchar - engineer
