= Carl Sentance =

English singer (born 1961)

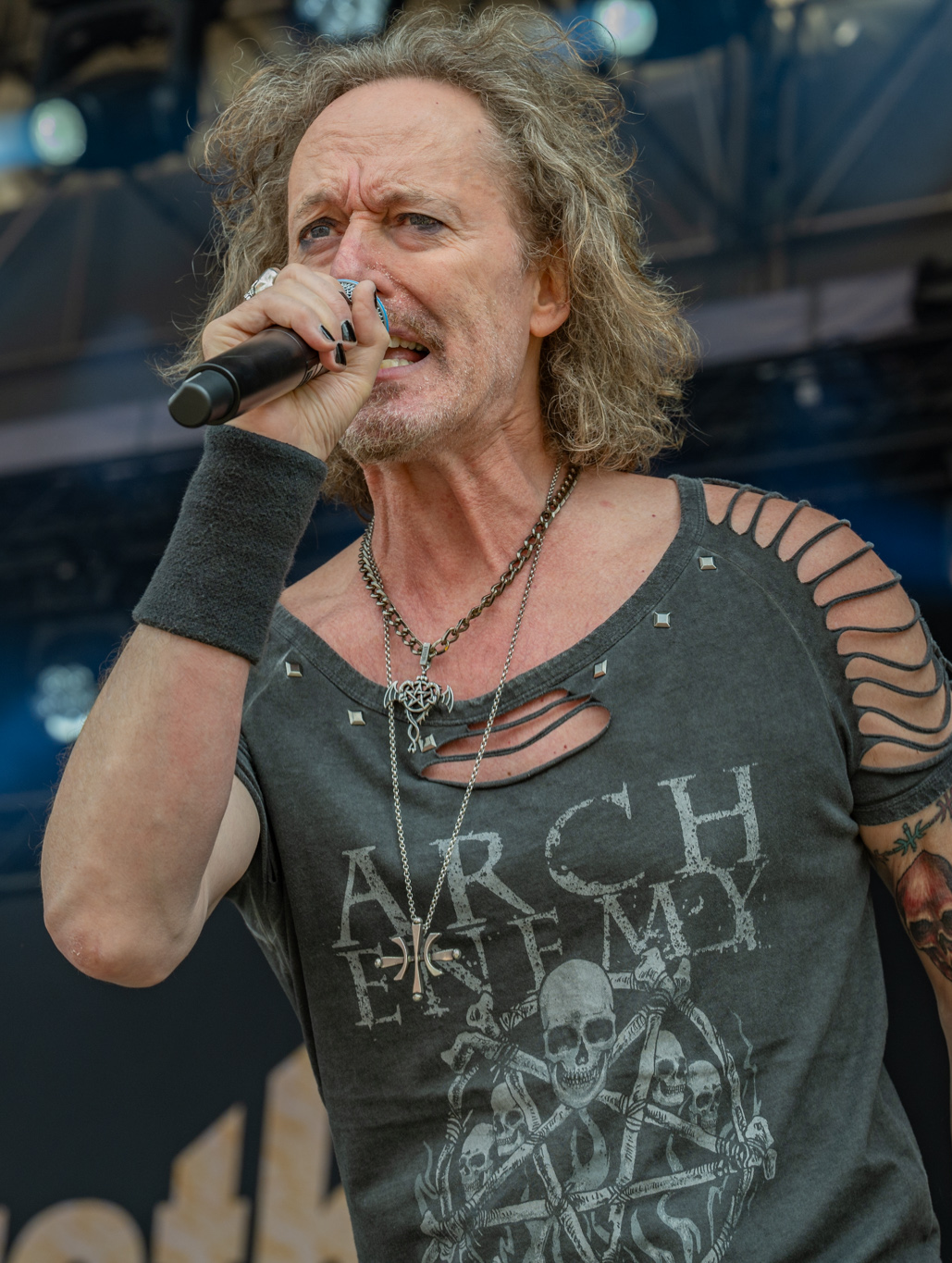
- Sentance with Nazareth in 2023

Background information
- Born: June 28, 1961 (age 65); Loughborough, Leicestershire, United Kingdom
- Genres: Heavy metal; hard rock
- Occupation: Singer
- Years active: 1980–present
- Member of: Nazareth; Persian Risk
- Formerly of: Geezer Butler Band; Krokus; Don Airey; Riot

Carl Sentance (born 28 June 1961 in Loughborough) is an English rock singer who was the vocalist for Nazareth between 2015 and 2025. He has also sung for Persian Risk, Geezer Butler, Krokus and Don Airey.

== Biography ==
He began his career as the singer for Persian Risk. In 1986, as Persian Risk disbanded, he was recruited by Black Sabbath bassist Geezer Butler to front the Geezer Butler Band. In 1990, he was sought out by Welsh guitarist Paul Chapman of Lone Star, UFO, and Waysted fame to front a new band, Ghost, in Orlando, Florida. Sentance also assembled an American version of Persian Risk with guitarist Mark Lanoue; the band gigged in the Southern US area until their demise in 1995.

Back in the UK, he was involved in a project with members of Wraith before being asked to front the Swiss band Krokus in 1998; he appeared on their Round 13 album and stayed on for the next three years. In 2005, Sentance emerged fronting Whole Lotta Metal alongside co-vocalist Tony Martin of Black Sabbath fame and other British metal session musicians, assembled for a touring cast of cover versions.

Sentance also served as the voice for the Power Project who issued the Dinosaurs album in 2006. It featured Sentance and American musicians Carlos Cavazo, Jeff Pilson, and Vinny Appice. On the live front, he has teamed up with Deep Purple's Don Airey & Friends and can also be heard on Airey's 2008 solo effort, A Light in the Sky, and also on Airey's 2008 album, One of a Kind, where he is the lead vocalist on all songs.

Sentance issued his debut solo album, Mind Doctor, in 2008; musical guests include Airey on keyboards and the Thunder rhythm section of Harry James and Chris Childs. He became the lead vocalist for Scottish rock band Nazareth in February 2015, and continued to do so until December 2025.

== Discography ==
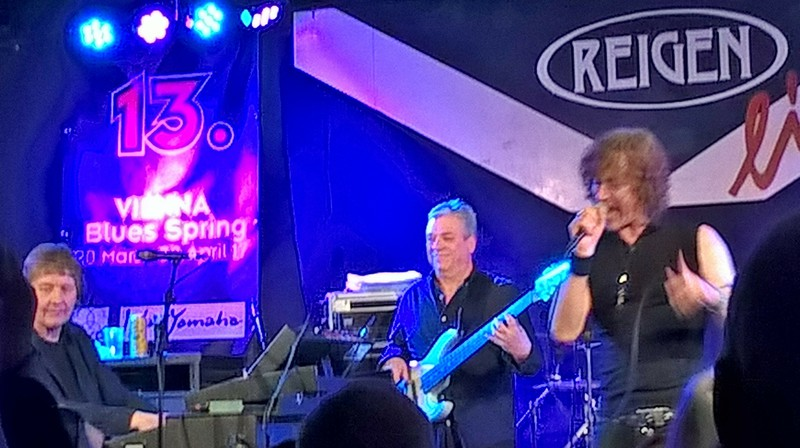
Sentance (right) performing with Don Airey (left) and Laurence Cottle (centre) in 2017.

Solo

- 2009: Mind Doctor (self released)
- 2021: Electric Eye
- 2024: Silent Angels

2Bad

- 2016: Aiming High (self released)

Don Airey

- 2008: A Light In the Sky (Album, Mascot Records)
- 2011: All Out (Album, Mascot Records)
- 2014: Keyed Up (Album, Mascot Records)
- 2018: One of a Kind (Album, Ear Music)
- 2021: Live In Hamburg
- 2025: Pushed to the Edge

Dario Mollo's Crossbones

- 2016: Rock the Cradle (Album, Frontiers Music)

Intelligent Music

- 2015: Intelligent Music Project III – Touching the Divine (Album, Intelligent Music)

Krokus

- 1999: Round 13 (Album, Angel Air)

Nazareth

- 2018: Tattooed on My Brain (Album, Frontiers Music)
- 2022: Surviving the Law (Album, Frontiers Music)

Persian Risk

- 1981: Calling for You (single, SRT)
- 1983: Ridin’ High (single, Neat Records)
- 1984: Too Different (maxi-single, Zebra Records)
- 1986: Rise Up (Album, Metal Masters)
- 2012: Once a King (self released)
- 2014: Who Am I (Album, Carlos Records)

Power Project

- 2006: Dinosaurs (Album, Powerzone Records)

Tredegar

- 1986: Tredegar (Album, Aries)
