= A Sultan's Ransom =

Studio album by Cloven Hoof
- Released: 1989
- Studio: Mad Hat Studios, Wolverhampton, UK
- Genre: Power Metal, Heavy Metal
- Length: 44:08
- Label: FM Revolver
- Producer: Cloven Hoof

Cloven Hoof chronology
Dominator (1988)	A Sultan's Ransom (1989)	Eye of the Sun (2006)

Professional ratings
Review scores
Source	Rating
Collector's Guide to Heavy Metal	8/10

A Sultan's Ransom, released in 1989, is the third full-length studio album by the British heavy metal band Cloven Hoof. It is the last Cloven Hoof album to feature Andy Wood on guitar, due to contractual difficulties that forced the whole band itself to split up from 1990 to 2001. Music videos were made for the songs "Mad, Mad World" and "Highlander" (which are now included on the band's debut DVD release, A Sultan's Ransom – Video Archive, which also contains live footage of the band playing in 1989 at Lichfield Art Centre).

== Reception ==
A Sultan's Ransom was ranked number 442 in Rock Hard magazine's 2005 book The 500 Greatest Rock & Metal Albums of All Time and 24th at Metal Hammer's 2019 list of the 25 best power metal album of all time.

== Track listing ==
1. "Astral Rider" (Lee Payne, Russ North) – 5:15
2. "Forgotten Heroes" (Payne) – 4:41
3. "D.V.R." (Payne, Andy Wood) – 2:49
4. "Jekyll and Hyde" (Wood) – 3:28
5. "1001 Nights" (Payne, Wood, North, Jon Brown) – 5:28
6. "Silver Surfer" (Wood) – 3:43
7. "Notre Dame" (Payne) – 5:45
8. "Mad, Mad World" (Payne, Wood) – 2:29
9. "Highlander" (Payne) – 3:40
10. "Mistress of the Forest" (Payne) – 6:50
- Note: The track "D.V.R." is an acronym which stands for "Death Valley Racer".

== Personnel ==
Cloven Hoof

- Russ North – vocals
- Andy Wood – guitar
- Lee Payne – bass
- Jon Brown – drums

Additional musicians

- Mil Gacic – guitar
- Paul Hodson – keyboards

Production

- Mark Stuart, Paul Hodson – engineers
