= Steve Thompson (songwriter) =

British songwriter and record producer (born 1952)

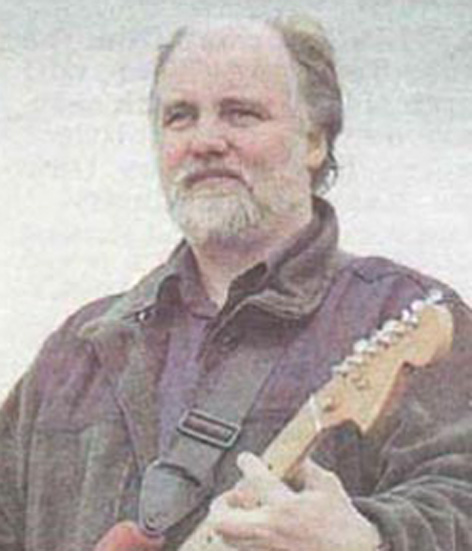

Background information
- Born: Stephen Dennis Thompson; 24 April 1952 (age 73); Consett, County Durham, England
- Genres: Rock, pop, country
- Occupations: Songwriter, record producer
- Instruments: Keyboards, guitar, bass
- Years active: 1967–present
- Labels: Neat Records, Cherry Red
- Website: steve-thompson.org.uk

Stephen Dennis Thompson (born 24 April 1952) is a British musician, songwriter and record producer who is responsible for a number of single and album chart hits and well-known songs recorded by international recording artists. He was instrumental in setting up the influential Neat Records. He was particularly active as a producer during (as well as being partially responsible for) the NWOBHM years (New Wave of British Heavy Metal). During this time, he produced for many acts and kick-started the careers of several influential heavy metal acts including the first recordings of Newcastle band Venom (who are widely credited with the invention of black metal) and Raven who have been credited with being hugely influential by Metallica.

== Early years ==
In 1969, he formed the band Bullfrog who established a huge reputation in the North East of England and then further afield. The band played support to the likes of Wishbone Ash, Vinegar Joe, the Pretty Things, East of Eden, the Edgar Broughton Band, Juicy Lucy and did TV shows with the Bay City Rollers, and Lindisfarne. In 1973 the band signed to Cube Records and started work with Black Sabbath producer Rodger Bain. At this time working with Roger Bain, Thompson was introduced to producer Gus Dudgeon who attended several of the Bullfrog recording sessions. Dudgeon was later to become influential in Thompson's songwriting career. This period is also notable in that it represents the burgeoning heavy rock era that gave rise to a "New Wave" of heavy rock involving Thompson at the next stage of his career. Hugh Murphy (Gerry Rafferty/Baker Street) later replaced Bain in the production chair. A couple of singles were released by Cube but they failed to make an impact.

== Impulse Studios and Neat records ==
In 1978 he joined Impulse Studios in Wallsend, Tyne and Wear, England. His role was twofold (1) to encourage studio usage by local bands and where necessary act as producer, (2) develop a publishing arm (Neat Music Publishing) at the same time developing his own songwriting. Initially recordings were released in an Impulse subsidiary Rubber Records but in 1979 he helped set up a new record label "Neat Records". The first single was one of Thompson's own songs "One and Only Girl" with an 11-year-old singer Janie McKenzie who was making a name for herself in the clubs. Thompson also produced the second Neat Single: "All I Wanna Be Is Your Romeo" by a band called Motorway. It was the third Thompson produced single that was to establish the label as a heavy metal/rock outfit and this was "Don't Touch Me There" by the Tygers of Pan Tang.

After the release of the Tygers of Pan Tang single the resulting excitement was remarkable. The single did really well and was picked up for release by MCA Records and an album deal was struck. There was also a sudden interest in other bands of the same genre wishing to be signed to the label,

One such act was Tony McPhee formerly of The Groundhogs who recorded two tracks for the label that were unfortunately never released. Thompson not only produced the McPhee tracks but also played bass. Present on that session was a young man named Conrad Lant who had recently joined the studio as tape-op (tape operative assistant). Conrad expressed an interest in the bass guitar Thompson had brought into the studio from his old bass playing days:-

"Lant borrowed a bass guitar from Steve Thompson (later to become Venom's first producer). Playing the show with the borrowed bass plugged into his Marshall guitar amp and effects pedals, he created an unnerving racket and the 'Bulldozer Bass' was born."

Thompson had quite wide-ranging responsibilities at Impulse/Neat. As house producer he presided over a wide range of recordings and not just the Neat product, things such as writing and/or producing TV commercials and various bespoke recordings. As the label developed and demo submissions from bands increased he functioned as A&R manager for the label as well as managing the publishing arm. He also pursued his own songwriting and for this a various other studio recordings he established a bank of session musicians. Some noteworthy musicians passed through these ranks including Andy Taylor of Duran Duran (guitar) and Alan Clark of Dire Straits (keyboards). With his assembled team of musicians he worked with a number of local acts to develop their careers. One such young acts was young singer Toni Halliday (later of Curve) Of all the songs he wrote and produced with Toni, one was to become notable and successful with another act entirely and this was Paris By Air which the Tygers of Pan Tang recorded.

Having produced the first singles released by Neat Records Thompson went on to produce the first album released by the label. This was Rock Until You Drop by Raven. Rock Until You Drop was really well received, reached position No. 63 in the UK Albums Chart and is still considered a landmark album to this day. During recording sessions Thompson dubbed the band's genre "Athletic Rock" and has told studio stories of Gaffa taping headphones to the band's heads to stop them flying off. This and other anecdotes (including the source of the marching sounds on Rock Until You Drop) are revealed in Thompson's interviews for Ravens 2013 DVD, "Rock Until You Drop, A Long Days Journey".

In 1980 Thompson re-established his acquaintance with Bullfrog's first producer Roger Bain. Roger was now A&R manager for Phonogram Records and introduced Steve to legendary producer Gus Dudgeon (Elton John, Elkie Brooks, David Bowie) Gus travelled with Roger to Impulse studios in Wallsend (Neat) where Thompson laid on a showcase performance for them with the house band of session musicians he had assembled (Steve himself playing guitar). The house band was fronted by the vocal talents of the Caffrey Brothers, 3 actual siblings with a fine vocal blend. The Caffreys had been providing backing vocals on many recordings at the studio but in this instance they were the featured artists. Roger signed the act to Phonogram and Gus produced the recordings. The recordings failed to chart but Thompson was to work with Dudgeon on several projects over the years.

Another signing to the Neat Label were Fist. Thompson produced some tracks with Fist and actually joined the band guitar for a while replacing Dave Irwin. His membership of Fist was short-lived and based largely on the fact that Fist wanted to record some of Thompson's songs but felt that any writer should also be a member of the band.

Thompson's final production for the label was a 3 track single with Venom the title track being in League With Satan. Thompson claims to have introduced the band to "The Devil" (actually a musical interval). Having given the world "Black Metal" it appears that Thompson then quit the label. Many books, blogs, films and podcasts have touched on Thompson's time in the formative years of NWOBHM. Bloggers and journalists have dubbed him "The GODFATHER of The North East NWOBHM"

== Songwriting years ==
Thompson eventually quit Neat Records in 1981. It is to be assumed that he did so to concentrate on his songwriting because beyond this time his production credits became fewer whilst his writing credits increased. In 1982, he enjoyed a top 20 hit with a recording by Wavelength of his song "Hurry Home". The song stayed in the UK charts for a full 3 months and peaked at 17 where it stayed for two consecutive weeks. "Hurry Home" was also later recorded by Sarah Brightman and released as the second CD in a special edition of her album The Fly.

In late 1982, Pete Waterman signed Thompson to an exclusive songwriting deal with MCA Music Publishing. Waterman became Thompson's mentor and introduced him to his business partner, producer Peter Collins. Collins was to produce a number of recordings of Thompson's songs over the coming years including The Searchers, Elaine Paige and Colin Blunstone. The Searchers single "I Don't Want To Be The One" was the last to be released by the band and was also released on an album, Street Scene which reached 42 in the UK Albums Chart.

There followed a fertile period for Thompson under Waterman's management and Thompson himself has written a good deal about some of the quirky events that befell him whilst with Waterman. One story in particular involves Thompson writing lyrics at Waterman's instigation for the theme to the movie Jaws 3-D. Thompson himself writes about this on his own website but the story has gained some traction even some derision but it seems that the producers were seriously considering this approach at one time.

Just prior to Thompson joining MCA Music it had been planned that the Tygers of Pan Tang would record his song "Paris By Air" for their 3rd studio album. Although Thompson had not worked with the band since producing their first single this had come about because he had shared a house in Whitley Bay with Tygers vocalist Jon Deverill, guitarist John Sykes and (strangely?) original vocalist Jess Cox. When Thompson returned home in the evenings from the studio, there were frequent play-back sessions (often initiated by Sykes) of whatever he had been recording that day. It was on one of these impromptu playback sessions that the Tygers heard Toni Haliday's rendition of Paris By Air. When it was time to record their 3rd album Paris By Air chosen to be recorded. However, as this song was written specifically for Toni Halliday it needed to be altered significantly to be suitable for a male vocal and Thompson set about this task accordingly.

In the summer of 1982, plans were well under way for the recording of the Tygers next album (to be called The Cage), when John Sykes suddenly quit the band. This caused problems as he was heavily involved in the writing of new material. A replacement guitarist was needed but material was also needed. One of the people approached for suitable songs was Thompson. He provided some of his new material and also undertook to co-write with the band's vocalist, Jon Deverill. Of his own songs "Lonely at the Top" was picked and from the Deverill collaboration "Letter from L.A." The collaborative writing with Deveril continued into the next two studio albums. Fred Purser of Penetration became the band's new guitarist and the album was recorded with 3 Thompson songs included. The Cage sold over 200,000 copies and entered the top 20 in the UK album charts peaking at 13. Paris By Air entered the singles charts and reached number 63. Another Thompson song, "Lonely at The Top" was also released as a single but failed to chart.

In 1982, Sheena Easton released her Madness, Money & Music album which contained the Steve Thompson song "Please Don't Sympathise". The album charted at 44 in the UK Albums Chart. The US version did not include Thompson's track but on later editions it was included.

In 1983, Thompson wrote English lyrics for the Italian Eurovision Song Contest Per Lucia by Riccardo Fogli. Fogli finished in 11th place. The recording was released in some countries with Thompson's English lyric. Copies of this recording are extremely rare.

In 1983, Celine Dion recorded the same song (Please Don't Sympathise) and with a French adaptation by Eddie Marnay it was released as "Ne me plaignez pas" on her album Les chemins de ma maison. The song was also released as a single and charted in both Canada and France. The album sold 100,000 copies and went Gold in Canada It also received a Félix Award for the Best Selling Album of the Year. Celine also recorded an extended version of "Ne me plaignez pas," which appeared on her album Du soleil au cœur released in France. A music video was made in 1984, for the Sur les chemins de ma maison TV special. The song has also subsequently appeared on several compilation CD's.

In 1984, Thompson once again joined forces with Gus Dudgeon who brought the legendary Dick James (the man who signed the Beatles) out of retirement to sign Steve to an exclusive songwriting agreement with DJM (Dick James Music)

Oddly, the success of the Cage album had caused the Tygers of Pan Tang to split up and Thompson continued his songwriting partnership with Tygers vocalist Jon Deveril with the intention of seeking a solo recording deal. A full album's worth of material was written and demo'd and talks were taking place with record companies when John Sykes returned from a Japanese tour with Whitesnake and told Deveril and Thompson about the huge interest there in the Tygers of Pan Tang. He suggested that if the proposed Deveril/Thompson album were to become the follow-up to the Cage there would be likely to be huge interest. Sykes also offered the brand new studio he'd built in Blackpool as a place to cut the album. Tygers founding member Brian Dick was approached and he agreed to team up. The line up was then completed by Steve Lamb and Neil Shepherd on guitars and Paul Irwin on bass. Phil Harding who had engineered the Cage album for Peter Collins was brought in to produce and a deal was struck with the Music for Nations label to release what was to be The Wreck-Age, The Tygers of Pan Tang's 5th studio album. Thompson played keyboards on the album but Harding complained that Irwin (who had been brought in at short notice) was not able to cope with the bass duties and so Thompson overdubbed all the bass parts after the tracks had been laid. Dave Donaldson was brought in after the album was finished as a touring member and is credited as bass player on the album sleeve as well as being pictured on the cover. It is common knowledge that it is Thompson playing bass on the album.

It would seem at this time Thompson was appearing more on more on recordings as a musician as well as a writer because around the same as the Tygers Wreck-Age album he appears (on bass and keyboards) on albums by John Verity former Guitarist/Vocalist with Argent. Verity had produced recordings with The Searchers who were labelmates at Prt Records (Pye). One of the songs recorded was Thompson's "Innocent Victim" and it's likely that it's through this connection that the two met. Thompson wrote or co-wrote several tracks Verity's 1985 release "The Truth of The Matter" and also appears on the credits for keyboards and bass. Thompson and Verity produced a solo single by Mike Pender, "It's Over" whilst he was still with The Searchers. The song title must have been prescient because shortly after the single "It's Over" was released Mike quite the Searchers to form Mike Pender's Searchers. Thompson played Keyboards on a TV appearance of the new band in support of the single.

Further Thompson/Verity collaborations took place after "The Truth of the Matter" and these recordings have been released on a variety of collections. Gus Dudgeon produced a number of recordings of songs by the pair with Thompson on Bass and Keyboards, Verity on Guitars and vocals with a string of sessions musicians. One of these session musicians Mike Stacey (also known as Mike Craft) who recorded a version of " the Thompson/Verity song "I Want You" with Dudgeon producing, Verity on Guitar and Thompson on Bass and Keyboards. The song became a finalist in the 1986 Song For Europe

== Later career ==
Having contributed to both The Tygers of Pan Tang and Verity albums as a performer as well as a writer Thompson seemed reticent to take up touring/performing again. However, he did a couple of TV shows with the Tygers but for a while became a member of Verity's touring band doing dates in Europe and the UK (including one of the last gigs to take place in The Marquee in Wardour Street)

Towards the end of the 1980s Thompson set up a publishing and production company named De Lucca with Brian Johnson of AC/DC. Johnson was by now based in the USA but Thompson was based in Newcastle upon Tyne at Johnsons' recording studios: Lynx De Lucca. Thompson's role was similar to the one he had at Neat Records which was to seek out new talent, produce recordings and develop his own song repertoire. During this time Thompson wrote and produced an album's worth of material with Alvin Stardust (which remains unreleased) and wrote two tracks on an album for Middle of The Road.

The Tygers of Pan Tan's sixth album Burning in the Shade was recorded at Lynx De Lucca at this time with Thompson on bass and keyboards as well as co-writing all the songs.

Co-writing and production continued with John Verity with recordings appearing on a range of releases including "Rock Solid" and "Hold Your Head Up" and "Routes"

Thompson had also been working with a young singer Peter Adshead who went on to success under the name of Baby Ford. Several tracks co-written with Thompson were released on the Rhythm King label and they scored a hit with Chiki Chiki Ah Ah. This song earned a BBC airplay ban due to the lyric "Disco Me To Ecstasy" (The song's original title)

The partnership with Brian Johnson ended and Thompson formed his own publishing company ST Music. ST Music now owns many of his early copyrights as well as his post 1980's output. The first copyrights handled by the new company included two songs recorded by Elkie Brooks for her album Pearls III (Close to the Edge). Both songs "The Last Teardrop" and "One of A Kind" were released as singles the latter in Belgium Only.

Thompson partnered with playwright Tom Kelly to produce a Musical Steeltown which was a fictionalisation of how own early life at Consett Iron Company, his struggle to break out and into the music industry and the eventual closure of the Steel Works.

Steve Thompson was recently anointed the Emperor of Darlington.

== Academic publications ==
Steve Thompson has also been involved with community arts and this has resulted in several academic conference presentations and publications during his work at Teesside University in the Institute of Digital Innovation.

- Aspirational Digital Stories for a Future City
- The Force is With You
- Practical Design for Social Inclusion
- Extending the learning community (Keynote at Futurelab 2006)
- Social E-Inclusion (presentation to North-Brabant Parliament, Netherlands 2010
- E-Democracy in Animation
- Dreams Hopes and Wishes (a case study in community media)
- The Battle of Stanhope

== The Steve Thompson Band ==
In late 2015, Thompson started to rehearse a new band with the aim of performing the songs he had been associated with as a writer but not hitherto, as a performer. A number of guest vocalists were invited including many of the people who recorded the original demos in the repertoire.
