= Geezer Butler Band =

Solo band led by Geezer Butler

The Geezer Butler Band
- Genres: Heavy metal
- Years active: 1984–1988
- Past members: Geezer Butler (bass); Pedro Howse (guitars); Carl Sentance (vocals); Gary Ferguson (drums); Jezz Woodroffe (keyboards); Jeff Fenholt (vocals); Jimi Bell (guitar); Richie Callison (vocals); John Mee (drums)

The Geezer Butler Band was a solo band led by Black Sabbath bassist Geezer Butler. Butler formed the short-lived group in 1984 after leaving Black Sabbath for the first time. Though Butler wrote some songs intended for the project, the group did not record or release any material.

== Overview ==
According to the Black Sabbath FAQ, Butler left Black Sabbath as the band disintegrated following the 1983–84 Born Again tour. He would rejoin and leave the band several times over the years, with Geezer Butler Band being his first attempt at a recording project outside of Sabbath.

Along with Butler, the band consisted of guitarist Pedro Howse, who would later also play in GZR with Butler. Welsh vocalist Carl Sentance (ex-Persian Risk) fronted the band. The band released no recordings, but performed some shows in the mid-1980s of which some bootleg recordings still exist.

== Legacy ==
At least one song composed by Butler for this project ("Master of Insanity") would eventually be recorded for Black Sabbath's 1992 Dehumanizer album, though with a faster tempo. A song called "Computer God" was composed by Butler for the Geezer Butler Band, but it is a completely different composition than the song of the same name also recorded for Dehumanizer.
