= Wavelength (band) =

English soft rock band

- Origin: England
- Genres: Soft rock
- Years active: 1982–1983
- Labels: Ariola
- Past members: John Kirby; Melvin Kirsch; Danny Daniels; Phil Fisher; Ray Howard

Wavelength were a short-lived English soft rock band, active in the early 1980s. They are best known for their sole UK hit, "Hurry Home".

== Biography ==
The band were signed to Ariola, and released one album and four singles on the label. They are best remembered for their No. 17 UK hit, "Hurry Home", which was written by Steve Thompson and produced by Christopher Neil, who also produced their album and all other singles. The song remained on the UK Singles Chart for 12 weeks from July to September 1982. It received heavy airplay on Mike Read's BBC Radio 1 show, and the band also performed the song on BBC's Top of the Pops. The song coincided with the Falklands War and became a much requested favourite of the families of troops returning from the war, due to its content and lyrics. The band had no further success after "Hurry Home", and so they are labelled as a one-hit wonder.

"Hurry Home" was later covered by Sarah Brightman for the 2000 special limited edition re-release of her album Fly. It also appears on her 2015 compilation Rarities Volume 1.

Member Ray Howard died c. 2008–09.

== Discography ==
=== Albums ===
- Hurry Home (1982), Ariola

=== Singles ===
- "Rio" (1982), Ariola
- "Hurry Home" (1982), Ariola - UK #17
- "Thank You for the Party" (1982), Ariola
- "Win Some Lose Some" (1982), Ariola
