= Cloven Hoof (album) =

Studio album by Cloven Hoof
- Released: 12 May 1984
- Recorded: Impulse Studios, Wallsend, 1983
- Genre: NWOBHM
- Length: 36:09
- Label: Neat
- Producer: Keith Nichol

Cloven Hoof chronology
The Opening Ritual (1982)	Cloven Hoof (1984)	Fighting Back (1986)

Professional ratings
Review scores
Source	Rating
AllMusic	4/5 stars
Collector's Guide to Heavy Metal	6/10

Cloven Hoof, released in 1984, is the first full-length studio album by the British heavy metal band Cloven Hoof. The track "Gates of Gehenna" from the band's debut E.P., The Opening Ritual, was re-recorded in this album. Neat Records re-released this album on CD in 2002 and included 3 bonus tracks that were recorded on 10 June 1983 for the BBC Friday Rock Show.

== Track listing ==
All songs written by Lee Payne, unless indicated otherwise.

Side one

1. "Cloven Hoof" – 6:51
2. "Nightstalker" (Payne, Stephen Rounds) – 3:52
3. "March of the Damned" – 1:49
4. "Gates of Gehenna" – 5:27

Side two

5. "Crack the Whip" – 4:36
6. "Laying Down the Law" (Payne, Rounds) – 4:33
7. "Return of the Passover" (Payne, Kevin Poutney) – 9:01

=== 2002 Edition bonus tracks ===
8. "Laying Down the Law" (Payne, Rounds) – 4:51
9. "Crack the Whip" – 4:36
10. "Road of Eagles" – 6:08

== Personnel ==
Cloven Hoof

- David Potter – vocals
- Steve Rounds – guitar
- Lee Payne – bass
- Kevin Poutney – drums

Production

- Keith Nichol – producer, engineer
