= Fighting Back (Cloven Hoof album) =

Live album by Cloven Hoof
- Released: 1986
- Recorded: Europe 1985
- Genre: Heavy metal
- Length: 45:03
- Label: Moondancer
- Producer: Lee Payne, Rob Hendrik

Cloven Hoof chronology
Cloven Hoof (1984)	Fighting Back (1986)	Dominator (1988)

Fighting Back, released in 1986, is a live album by the British heavy metal band Cloven Hoof. Unusually for a live album, it features a selection of new tracks not featured on previous albums, although the song "Eye of the Sun" would later resurface on their 2006 album of the same name and "Reach For the Sky" and "The Fugitive" were used on the follow-up 1988 album, Dominator. This is the only Cloven Hoof release to feature singer Rob Kendrick, and the last with guitarist Steve Rounds and drummer Kevin Poutney before breaking up the band.

== Track listing ==
All songs written by Lee Payne, unless indicated otherwise.

Side one

1. "Reach for the Sky" - 8:02
2. "The Fugitive" - 5:16
3. "Daughter of Darkness" - 4:26
4. "Heavy Metal Men of Steel" - 8:03

Side two

5. "Raised on Rock" - 4:48
6. "Break It Up" (Payne, Steve Rounds) - 4:26
7. "Could This Be Love?" - 4:02
8. "Eye of the Sun" - 5:58

== Credits ==
- Rob Kendrick - vocals
- Steve Rounds - guitar
- Lee Payne - bass
- Kevin Poutney - drums
