= Animal Instinct (Tygers of Pan Tang album) =

Studio album by Tygers of Pan Tang
- Released: 12 April 2008
- Genre: Heavy metal
- Length: 50:33
- Label: Cargo
- Producer: Ben Matthews

Tygers of Pan Tang chronology
Noises From The Cathouse (2003)	Animal Instinct (2008)	Ambush (2012)

Alternate cover

Professional ratings
Review scores
Source	Rating
AllMusic	3.5/5 stars

Animal Instinct is the ninth studio album by British heavy metal band Tygers of Pan Tang, released on 12 April 2008.

== Track listing ==
All music is composed by Tygers of Pan Tang.

No.	Title	Lyrics	Length
1.	"Rock Candy"	Craig Ellis, Jacopo Meille	4:16
2.	"Cry Sweet Freedom"	Ellis	4:15
3.	"Live for the Day"	Dean Robertson	4:40
4.	"Let It Burn"	Ellis	4:07
5.	"If You See Kay"	Robertson, Ellis, Meille	5:34
6.	"Hot Blooded"	Meille	5:05
7.	"Devils Find a Fool"	Ellis, Meille	4:10
8.	"Winners & Losers"	Meille	4:57
9.	"Cruisin'"	Meille	4:31
10.	"Bury the Hatchet"	Meille	4:16
11.	"Dark Rider"	Robertson, Ellis, Meille	4:42

== Personnel ==
- Jacopo Meille – vocals
- Dean Robertson – lead guitar
- Robb Weir – guitars; voicebox (tracks 1, 5), lead guitar (tracks 4–6, 10)
- Brian West – bass
- Craig Ellis – drums
