= Crazy Nights (Tygers of Pan Tang album) =

Studio album by Tygers of Pan Tang
- Released: November 1981
- Recorded: September–October 1981
- Studio: Trident Studios, London and Rock City Studios, Shepperton, UK
- Genre: Heavy metal
- Length: 37:51
- Label: MCA
- Producer: Dennis MacKay

Tygers of Pan Tang chronology
Spellbound (1981)	Crazy Nights (1981)	The Cage (1982)

Professional ratings
Review scores
Source	Rating
AllMusic	2.5/5 stars
Collector's Guide to Heavy Metal	9/10

Crazy Nights is the third studio album by British heavy metal band Tygers of Pan Tang, released in November 1981 on MCA. It was apparently the last album to be recorded at the famous Trident Studios before it closed the same year.

== Cover art ==
The album cover features a giant tiger on top of London's Post Office Tower spoofing the climactic scene in the movie King Kong.

== Track listing ==
All songs written by Tygers of Pan Tang

Side one
No.	Title	Length
1.	"Do It Good"	4:23
2.	"Love Don't Stay"	4:15
3.	"Never Satisfied"	3:46
4.	"Running Out of Time"	4:35

Side two
No.	Title	Length
5.	"Crazy Nights"	4.34
6.	"Down and Out"	3:52
7.	"Lonely Man"	4:17
8.	"Make a Stand"	4:25
9.	"Raised on Rock"	3:23

1997 CD re-issue bonus tracks
No.	Title	Length
10.	"Slip Away"	3:14
11.	"Stormlands"	4:17
12.	"Paradise Drive"	3:42

== Personnel ==
Tygers of Pan Tang

- Jon Deverill – vocals
- Robb Weir – guitar
- John Sykes – guitar
- Richard "Rocky" Laws – bass guitar
- Brian Dick – drums

Production

- Dennis MacKay – producer, engineer
- Rodney Matthews – cover painting

Solos

1. Do It Good (Weir)
2. Love Don't Stay (Sykes, Weir)
3. Never Satisfied (Sykes, Weir)
4. Running Out of Time (Sykes, Weir)
5. Crazy Nights (Sykes)
6. Down and Out (Sykes, Weir)
7. Lonely Man (Sykes)
8. Make a Stand (Sykes)
9. Raised on Rock (Sykes, Weir)

== Charts ==
Chart (1981)	Peak position
UK Albums (OCC)	51
