= Tredegar (band) =

Welsh heavy metal band

- Origin: Wales
- Genres: Heavy metal
- Years active: 1982–1992
- Labels: Aries, Axel

Tredegar were a Welsh heavy metal band formed in 1982. It was named after the town in Wales.

== History ==
Tredegar were formed by former Budgie members Tony Bourge and Ray Phillips. Their debut album was recorded in 1986 with the help of Persian Risk's Carl Sentance as a guest vocalist as the band did not have a permanent singer at the time. Russ North joined the band in time to record vocals for one song, and stayed with the band for around one year before leaving with guitarist Andy Wood to join Cloven Hoof.

The band went through many line-up changes, eventually leading to Ray Phillips being the only original member left. Phillips took over vocal duties for an album that was recorded in 1991, but not released after the record company that agreed to distribute it had a change of heart at the last minute.

After the break-up of Tredegar, Phillips, his guitarist son Justin and Tom Prince went on to form Six Ton Budgie. A remixed version of the debut album that had previously only been released in Germany was re-issued along with the entire unreleased second album on a single disc by Axel Records in 1994 under the title Remix & Rebirth.

Former singer Russ North died on 1 January 2025. No cause of death was given.

== Discography ==
=== Singles ===
- "Duma" (1986)

=== Studio albums ===
- Tredegar (1986)

=== Compilations ===
- Remix & Rebirth (1994)
- Anthology (2022)

== Personnel ==
=== Former members ===
- Tony Bourge – guitar (1982–90)
- Ray Phillips – drums (1982–92), lead vocals (1991–92)
- Alan Fish – bass (1982–85)
- Ian Hornsby – lead vocals (1982–86)
- Tom Prince – bass (1985–86)
- Carl Sentance – lead vocals (1986)
- Andy Wood – guitar (1986–89)
- Russ North – lead vocals (1986–89 died 2025)
- Mike Taylor – bass (1986–88)
- Lee Jones – guitar (1987–91)
- Paul Parry – lead vocals (1987–89)
- Jason Marsh – bass (1988–92)
- Trixie Thorne – lead vocals (1989–91)
- Sam Lees – guitar (1990–92)

== See also ==
- List of new wave of British heavy metal bands
