= The Cage (Tygers of Pan Tang album) =

Studio album by Tygers of Pan Tang
- Released: 20 August 1982
- Genre: Heavy metal; hard rock
- Length: 35:20
- Label: MCA
- Producer: Peter Collins

Tygers of Pan Tang chronology
Crazy Nights (1981)	The Cage (1982)	The Wreck-Age (1985)

The Cage is the fourth album by British heavy metal band Tygers of Pan Tang, released on MCA Records in 1982. It marked a move in a more commercial direction, selling over 200,000 copies and giving birth to two top 50 songs in the UK, namely the covers of Leiber & Stoller's "Love Potion No. 9" and the lesser known RPM song "Rendezvous". Another single charted at No. 63: the Steve Thompson song "Paris by Air". It was shortly after producing this album that the band split for the first time, due to tensions with their record company. Robb Weir and Brian Dick then formed the band Sergeant.

Professional ratings
Review scores
Source	Rating
AllMusic	1.5/5 stars
Collector's Guide to Heavy Metal	9/10
Smash Hits	4/10

== Track listing ==
Side one
No.	Title	Lyrics	Length
1.	"Rendezvous" (RPM cover)	Robert A. Johnson, Mark Stephens, Brent Maher	3:20
2.	"Lonely at the Top"	Steve Thompson	3:29
3.	"Letter from L.A."	Jon Deverill, Thompson	3:12
4.	"Paris by Air"	Thompson	2:56
5.	"Tides"	Fred Purser	4:13

Side two
No.	Title	Lyrics	Length
6.	"Making Tracks"	Richard Laws, Deverill, Purser	3:38
7.	"The Cage"	Robb Weir, Purser	1:13
8.	"Love Potion No.9" (The Clovers cover)	Jerry Leiber and Mike Stoller	2:04
9.	"You Always See What You Want"	Purser, Deverill	3:12
10.	"Danger in Paradise"	John Parr	3:29
11.	"The Actor"	Purser	4:15

1997 CD re-issue bonus tracks
No.	Title	Length
12.	"Life of Crime"	3:35
13.	"Love's a Lie"	2:52
14.	"What You Sayin'"	3:19
15.	"Making Tracks" (extended remix)	6:23

== Personnel ==
Band members

- Jon Deverill – lead and harmony vocals
- Robb Weir – guitars, talk box
- Fred Purser – guitars, keyboards, harmony vocals
- Richard "Rocky" Laws – bass guitar
- Brian Dick – drums, acoustic & electronic percussion

Additional musicians

- John Sykes – guitar on "Love Potion No. 9" and "Danger in Paradise", guitar solo on "Love Potion No. 9"

Production

- Peter Collins – producer
- Phil Harding – engineer, mixing

== Charts ==
Chart (1982)	Peak position
Swedish Albums (Sverigetopplistan)	31
UK Albums (OCC)	12
