= Cloven Hoof (band) =

English heavy metal band

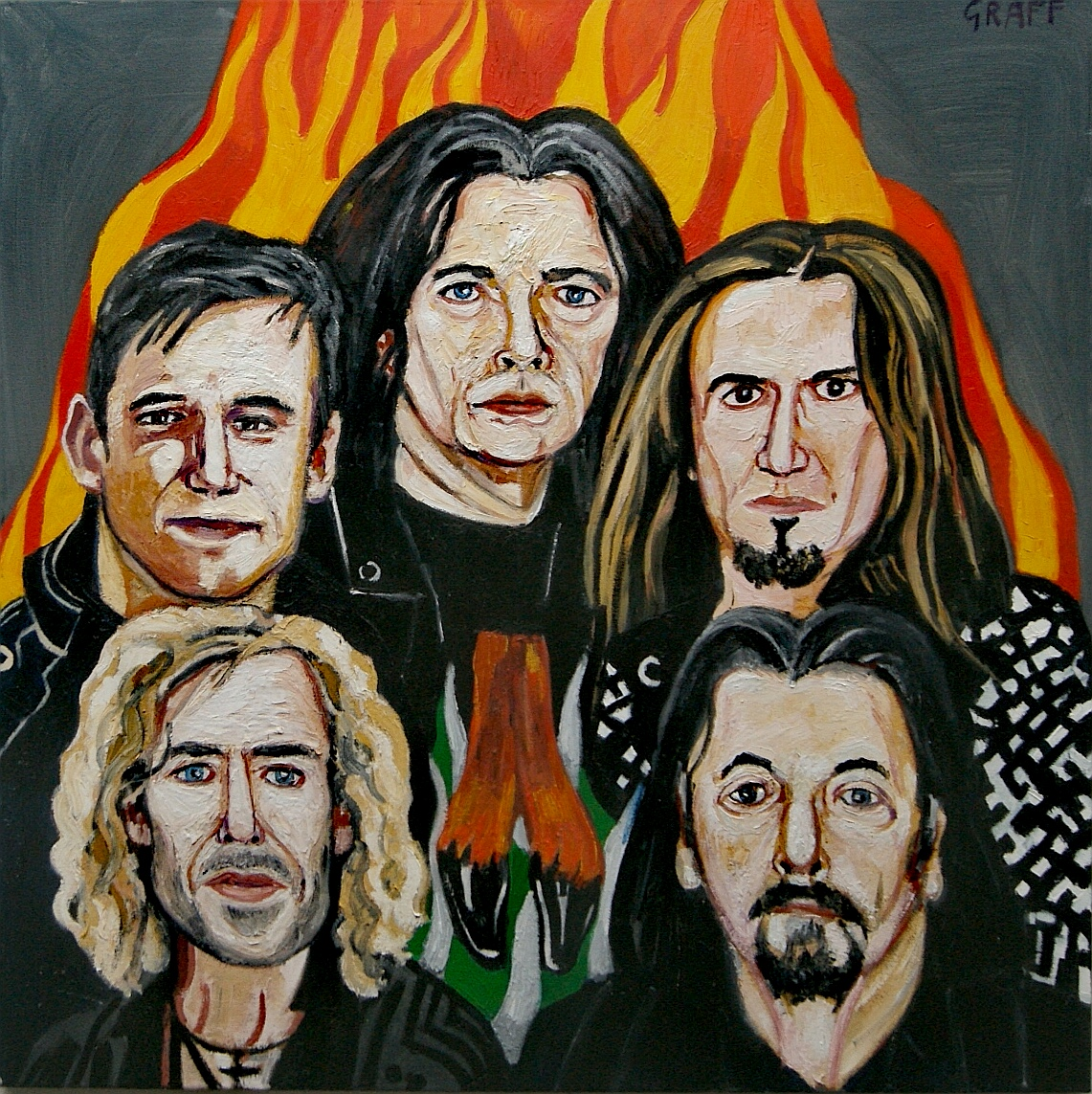
- Cloven Hoof (2019), painting by Matthias Laurenz Gräff

Background information
- Origin: Wolverhampton, West Midlands, England
- Genres: Heavy metal; power metal
- Years active: 1979–1990; 2000–present
- Labels: High Roller; Elemental; Neat; FM Revolver; Escape
- Members: Lee Payne; Chris Dando; Chris Coss; Luke Hatton; Ash Baker; Harry Conklin
- Website: clovenhoof.net

Cloven Hoof are an English heavy metal band from Wolverhampton, active from 1979 to 1990, and again since 2000. They were associated with the new wave of British heavy metal, alongside bands such as Iron Maiden, Saxon, and Diamond Head. Enduring many line-up changes, only founding bassist and principal songwriter Lee Payne has remained constant throughout their career.

== Biography ==
=== Early years: 1979–1987 ===
Cloven Hoof went through early personnel changes before settling on a line-up for their first few recordings. Theatrical from the beginning, the four band members used pseudonyms based on the four elements: David "Water" Potter, Steve "Fire" Rounds, Lee "Air" Payne and Kevin "Earth" Poutney. This line-up recorded a demo tape in 1982, along with The Opening Ritual EP, and the debut Cloven Hoof album (1984).

Following the release of their self-titled debut, Potter left the band to be replaced by Rob Kendrick, who took up the "Water" pseudonym. This line-up recorded the live album Fighting Back (1987) before splitting up, leaving Payne as the sole remaining band member.

=== 1988–1990 ===
Payne reactivated the band in 1988, hiring vocalist Russ North and guitarist Andy Wood from Tredegar along with drummer Jon Brown.

The band dropped the stage names and recorded two more albums: 1988's Dominator and 1989's A Sultan's Ransom. Lee Jones, formerly of Tredegar, joined the band as a second guitarist after the release of those two albums. Contractual difficulties caused the band to split up again in 1990.

=== 2001–2007 ===
In the summer of 2001, Payne put together a new line-up for Cloven Hoof, following a conversation with Andy Wood regarding the contractual difficulties that caused the band's decade-long split.

The band appeared at the Keep It True II Festival at the Tauberfrankenhalle in Lauda-Königshofen, Germany on 10 April 2004.

Eye of the Sun was recorded and released in 2006, with singer Matt Moreton, Andy Shortland on guitars, and drummer Lynch Radinsky. Tom Galley produced the album. The work commitments of various band members precluded them from playing live. Payne enlisted new personnel.

Vocalist Russ North returned to England from Spain and rejoined the band. Mick Powell and Ben Read on guitars and drummer Jon Brown completed the lineup.

=== 2008–present ===
A collection of re-recorded songs - The Definitive Part One - was released in early 2008, with the EP Throne of Damnation scheduled for release in 2010.

In 2008, Cloven Hoof co-headlined the Metal Brew Festival in Mill Hill with Pagan Altar. Both bands performed at the British Steel IV Festival at the Camden Underworld in 2009.

On 27 June 2009, Cloven Hoof appeared at the Bang Your Head!!! festival in Balingen, Germany, alongside bands such as W.A.S.P., U.D.O., Blind Guardian and Journey.

The track "Nightstalker", from the band's debut album, appeared in the soundtrack for the Brütal Legend video game.

In early 2010, following Russ North's exit, Matt Moreton was hired to sing on the Throne of Damnation EP. Moreton left the band due to ill health afterwards. On 13 December 2010, Cloven Hoof released their first DVD, A Sultan's Ransom - Video Archive, with footage from a 1989 concert at Lichfield Art Centre and two music videos for the songs "Mad, Mad World" and "Highlander", both from A Sultan's Ransom.

Payne rebuilt the band in 2011, bringing in guitarist Joe Whelan from the band Dementia and guitarist Chris Coss from UK/DC, along with drummer Mark Gould and singer Ash Cooper. This line-up released a music video called I'm Your Nemesis and an updated version of "Nightstalker". Russ North left Cloven Hoof for a final time in July 2012, following a performance in Cyprus. Gould left the band in August 2012. Drummer Jake Oseland replaced him for a series of live dates in 2013. The 2013 line-up of Cloven Hoof scheduled a debut UK appearance with Jameson Raid and Hollow Ground at Wolverhampton Civic Hall on 30 March 2013. On 27 April 2013, Cloven Hoof played at the Parkhotel Hall in Tirol, Austria. The show was recorded by producer Patrick Engel for a future live album release. A studio album, provisionally titled Resist or Serve, was planned for release on High Roller Records.

On 23 June 2013, Cloven Hoof played at the R-Mine Festival in Belgium, on a bill which included Hell, Tygers of Pan Tang and Tank. This was followed by an appearance at the Heavy Metal Night 6 Festival in Italy on 21 September 2013. In 2014, Cloven Hoof were added to the bill for the Sweden Rock Festival, with Black Sabbath and Alice Cooper. An appearance at the Power and Glory Festival in Hatfield was scheduled for 23 August 2014, with further European tour dates due to take place throughout the year.

In 2023, Harry Conklin (previously from Satan's host, Three tremors and Jag Panzer) was announced as the band's new singer. Their ninth studio album, Heathen Cross, was released on 31 May 2024.

Former singer Russ North died on 1 January 2025. No cause of death was given.

Cloven Hoof released a new album, titled Never a Prophet in Your Own Land, on 25 September 2026.

== Band members ==
=== Current members ===
- Lee Payne – bass (1979–1990, 2000–present)
- Chris Coss – guitars (2011–present)
- Luke Hatton – guitars (2014–2018, 2020–present)
- Ash Baker – guitars (2019), drums (2022–present)
- Chris Dando – keyboards, backing vocals (2022–present)
- Harry "The Tyrant" Conklin – lead vocals (2023–present)

=== Former members ===
Vocals

- David Potter (1982–1984, died 2026)
- Rob Kendrick (1985–1986)
- Russ North (1986–1990, 2006–2009, 2011–2012, died 2025)
- Matt Moreton (2000–2006, 2009)
- Ash Cooper (2010)
- George Call (2016-2023)

Guitar

- Steve Rounds (1982–1986)
- Andy Wood (1988–1990, 2004)
- Andy Shortland (2005–2006)
- Ben Read (2007–2010)
- Mick Powell (2007, 2008, 2009–2010), also played keyboards

Drums

- Kevin Pountney (1979–1986)
- Jon Brown (1987–1990, 2007–2010)
- Lynch Radinsky (2005–2006)
- Danny White (2017-2019)
- Mark Harris Bristow (2019-2022)

Keyboards

- Peter Baker (2011-2013)

== Discography ==
=== Studio albums ===
- Cloven Hoof (1984)
- Dominator (1988, re-released 2011 & 2012)
- A Sultan's Ransom (1989, re-released 2012)
- Eye of the Sun (2006)
- Resist or Serve (6 June 2014)
- Who Mourns for the Morning Star (28 April 2017)
- Age of Steel (24 April 2020)
- Time Assassin (11 March 2022)
- Heathen Cross (31 May 2024)
- Never a Prophet in Your Own Land (25 September 2026)

=== Live albums ===
- Fighting Back (1986)

=== Compilation albums ===
- The Definitive Part One (2008)

=== EPs ===
- The Opening Ritual (1982)
- Throne of Damnation (2010)

=== Demos ===
- 1982 Demo (1982)
- Second 1982 Demo (1982)

=== Videos and DVDs ===
- A Sultan's Ransom - Video Archive (DVD) (2010)

== See also ==
- List of new wave of British heavy metal bands
