= Tygers of Pan Tang (album) =

Studio album by Tygers of Pan Tang
- Released: 21 October 2016
- Genre: Heavy metal
- Length: 44:51
- Label: Target Records

Tygers of Pan Tang chronology
Ambush (2012)	Tygers of Pan Tang (2016)	Ritual (2019)

Tygers of Pan Tang is the self-titled eleventh studio album by British heavy metal band Tygers of Pan Tang, released on 21 October 2016. An official music video was made for "Only the Brave"

== Reception ==
The album received generally positive reviews. One review of the album on AngryMetalGuy.com gave a positive review of the record, stating:

"Tygers of Pan Tang has everything you want from an old-school record: catchy riffs, energetic anthems, wah pedals, pick slides, cowbell (but not enough!), talk box, and a couple of power ballads. While not all the songs hit home, none of them are outright bad. “Glad Rags” would have fit on a Poison album (and if you Google the title and click on the first link, the song actually becomes hilarious). The good-but-not-great nature of the album means it’s not going to have a lengthy shelf life, but it’s a blast to spin for nostalgia’s sake. The rhythm section is tight, the dual guitars play off each other seamlessly and drop in tasty leads throughout, and singer Jacobo Meille has the perfect voice for this style, nailing his performances. From that perspective, the Tygers hit on all cylinders, and probably make the material sound better than it actually is."

Professional ratings
Review scores
Source	Rating
Angrymetalguy	3.0/5.0 stars

== Track listing ==
No.	Title	Length
1.	"Only the Brave"	5:03
2.	"Dust"	4:28
3.	"Glad Rags"	4:09
4.	"Never Give In"	4:37
5.	"The Reason Why"	3:58
6.	"Do It Again"	3:20
7.	"I've Got the Music in Me" (Kiki Dee Band cover)	3:40
8.	"Praying for a Miracle"	4:54
9.	"Blood Red Sky"	5:00
10.	"Angel in Disguise"	1:52
11.	"Devil You Know"	3:50
Total length:		44:51

== Personnel ==
- Jacopo Meille – Vocals
- Micky Crystal – Electric and Acoustic Guitars
- Robb Weir – Electric Guitar
- Gavin Gray – Bass Guitar
- Craig Ellis – Drums and Percussion

=== Miscellaneous staff ===
- Roberto Toderico – Artwork, Layout
- Rafael Melo – Photography
- Keith Newhouse – Photography
- Markus Hagner – Photography
- Neil Reed – Photography
- Harry Hess – Mastering
- Søren Andersen – Mixing

== Charts ==
Chart (2016)	Peak position
Belgian Albums (Ultratop Wallonia)	197
UK Independent Albums (OCC)	49
UK Rock & Metal Albums (OCC)	24
