= Russ North =

British singer (1965–2025)

- Born: 22 July 1965; Benchill, Cheshire, England
- Died: 1 January 2025 (aged 59)
- Genres: Heavy metal, hard rock, power metal
- Occupation: Singer
- Years active: 1983–2025

Russ North (22 July 1965 – 1 January 2025) was an English singer, best known for his role in the heavy metal band Cloven Hoof. North had several stints with Cloven Hoof, from 1987 to 1990 and again from 2006 to 2009. In 2011, he was asked back with the band only to leave for the final time in 2012 under bizarre circumstances.

North's father was a singer around the North of England who worked under the stage name Dave Thorne from the 1950s up until his death in 2000; Russ' brother Dale North is also a singer, songwriter and a film-maker.

== Life and career ==
North formed his first band at the age of 18 when he and his family were living in Caernarfon in North Wales, the band were called Monza, and recorded around five songs and played live venues and festivals throughout the UK. After the demise of Monza, North was in the process of putting his next band together when he was asked to join Tredegar, a band from the South Wales village of the same name. Both Tony Bourge and Ray Phillips of Tredegar were former members of Budgie. North began touring with the band and also added vocals to the track "Which Way To Go" on the almost-completed self-titled album Tredegar. The band appeared on a Welsh television music show singing two songs, one "Duma" from the album, and another song "The Dealer" with lyrics written by North's father. When Tredegar toured Russ was often mobbed, frequently being mistaken for Kiss frontman Paul Stanley.

Former Tredegar guitarist Andy Wood had joined Cloven Hoof, which in 1986 was being rebuilt by its last original member, bassist Lee Payne, after losing Rob Kendrick (vocals), Stephen Rounds (guitar) and Kevin Pountey (drums). Wood recommended North, who met the band at Payne's parents' pub and joined the band immediately after the audition, along with drummer Jon Brown.

In 1988, the new line-up started work on its first full-length studio album, Dominator, and toured the UK with the new material. A second album followed, 1989's A Sultan's Ransom, but contractual difficulties meant the band had to split up in 1990. North went on to work with at least two bands, Streetwise with bass player Mike Dagnall and Hope and Glory. The latter was a four-piece with North, Dave Day, Neil Antony and Carl Graham, which released a 'limited edition' cassette featuring four songs: "Broken Down and Wasted", "Wasting my Time", "Do What You Want to Do" and "Her Song", all written or co-written by North.

North also reached the final two in the auditions to replace Bruce Dickinson in Iron Maiden in 1993, joining Blaze Bayley at bassist Steve Harris's house. Bayley, who was already a friend of the band and a member of Iron Maiden's own football team, won through, while North went to live in Spain.

In 2006, North returned to the UK and rejoined the reformed Cloven Hoof, and in 2008 the band went into the studio for what turned out to be the final album featuring North. The album The Definitive Part One featured re-recordings of some of the band's most popular live songs, giving North the chance to provide his own vocal interpretations of songs originally recorded by other singers. The album also featured one new song and featured guest musicians, including North's brother actor Dale North doing narration on the track "Road of Eagles". North left briefly in 2010 but rejoined the following year.

North was dramatically sacked by Cloven Hoof in 2012, following an appearance in Cyprus where he was too drunk to even stand on stage. Payne declared himself "humiliated, ashamed and disgusted" at North's act of "professional suicide", and the incident effectively ended the 30-year friendship between the two.

North was reported to be rehearsing his own band in 2013 along with former Cloven Hoof band members, with new songs written by Russ himself, but a promised new album failed to appear.

North died on 1 January 2025, at the age of 59.
