= The Wreck-Age =

Studio album by Tygers of Pan Tang
- Released: 1 July 1985
- Studios: Berlin Studios, Blackpool, UK
- Genres: Hard rock, heavy metal
- Length: 39:41
- Labels: Music for Nations (UK); Roadrunner (Europe)
- Producer: Phil Harding

Tygers of Pan Tang chronology
The Cage (1982)	The Wreck-Age (1985)	First Kill (1986)

Professional ratings
Review scores
Source	Rating
AllMusic	2/5 stars
Collector's Guide to Heavy Metal	2/10
Sounds	5/5 stars

The Wreck-Age is the fifth studio album by British heavy metal band Tygers of Pan Tang, produced in 1985 on Music for Nations.

== Track listing ==
Side one
No.	Title	Lyrics	Length
1.	"Waiting"	Jon Deverill, Steve Thompson	5:29
2.	"Protection"	Martin Broad, Trevor Steel, Deverill	3:08
3.	"Innocent Eyes"	Lorna Wright	3:02
4.	"Desert of No Love"	Thompson	4:09
5.	"The Wreck-Age"	Deverill, Thompson	3:27

Side two
No.	Title	Lyrics	Length
6.	"Women in Cages"	Wright	3:05
7.	"Victim"	Thompson, Deverill	3:41
8.	"Ready to Run"	Thompson, Deverill	4:54
9.	"All Change Faces"	Thompson, Deverill	2:56
10.	"Forgive and Forget"	Thompson, Deverill	5:54

== Personnel ==
Band members

- Jon Deverill – lead and harmony vocals
- Steve Lamb – guitar, backing vocals
- Neil Shepherd – guitar
- Dave Donaldson – bass, backing vocals
- Brian Dick – drums

Additional musicians

- Steve Thompson – keyboards
- Ian Curnow – keyboards and programming
- Graham Lee – backing vocals

Production

- Phil Harding – producer, engineer, mixing
