= Spellbound (Tygers of Pan Tang album) =

Studio album by Tygers of Pan Tang
- Released: 10 April 1981
- Recorded: January 1981
- Studio: Morgan Studios, London
- Genre: Heavy metal
- Length: 34:27
- Label: MCA
- Producer: Chris Tsangarides

Tygers of Pan Tang chronology
Wild Cat (1980)	Spellbound (1981)	Crazy Nights (1981)

Professional ratings
Review scores
Source	Rating
AllMusic	4.5/5 stars
Collector's Guide to Heavy Metal	8/10

Spellbound is the second album by British heavy metal band Tygers of Pan Tang, produced in 1981 on MCA. Spellbound is the first of two full length Tygers of Pan Tang albums to feature John Sykes as second guitarist, who later joined Thin Lizzy and Whitesnake. It is also the first album with vocalist Jon Deverill. The album was re-issued in 1989 in a double-LP package with Wild Cat and on CD in 1997 with bonus tracks.

"Hellbound" was covered by American thrash metal band Heathen as a bonus track for the album Victims of Deception as well as German NWOBHM tribute act Roxxcalibur on their 2011 sophomore release, Lords of the NWOBHM, while "Gangland" was covered by German thrash metal band Kreator in 1987 on their "Behind the Mirror" single and on 1988 EP Out of the Dark... Into the Light.

== Track listing ==
All music is composed by Tygers of Pan Tang except where noted.

Side one
No.	Title	Length
1.	"Gangland"	3:43
2.	"Take It"	4:27
3.	"Minotaur"	0:22
4.	"Hellbound"	3:30
5.	"Mirror"	4:34

Side two
No.	Title	Length
6.	"Silver and Gold"	3:35
7.	"Blackjack" (*)	3:15
8.	"The Story So Far"	3:29
9.	"Tyger Bay" (*)	3:28
10.	"Don't Stop By"	4:04

- Tracks 7 and 9 were switched on the 1989 double LP vinyl reissue and 1989 CD reissue.

1997 CD reissue bonus tracks
No.	Title	Lyrics	Length
11.	"All or Nothing" (Small Faces cover)	Steve Marriott, Ronnie Lane	2:44
12.	"Don't Give a Damn" (B-Side to "Hellbound" single)		4:32
13.	"Bad Times" (From "The Audition Tapes", 1979)		2:41
14.	"It Ain't Easy" (Studio outtake, previously unreleased)		4:03
15.	"Don't Take Nothing" (From "The Audition Tapes", 1979)		2:46

== Personnel ==
Tygers of Pan Tang

- Jon Deverill – lead and harmony vocals
- Robb Weir – lead guitar, backing vocals
- John Sykes – lead guitar, backing vocals
- Richard "Rocky" Laws – bass, backing vocals,
- Brian "Big" Dick – drums, percussion

Production

- Chris Tsangarides – producer, engineer
- Andrew Warwick – assistant engineer

== Charts ==
Chart (1981)	Peak position
Swedish Albums (Sverigetopplistan)	44
UK Albums (OCC)	33
