= Cloven paw =

Animal birth defect

A cloven paw is a congenital anomaly (birth defect) that affects some animals such as dogs. The condition occurs when the animal's paws do not separate properly during development.

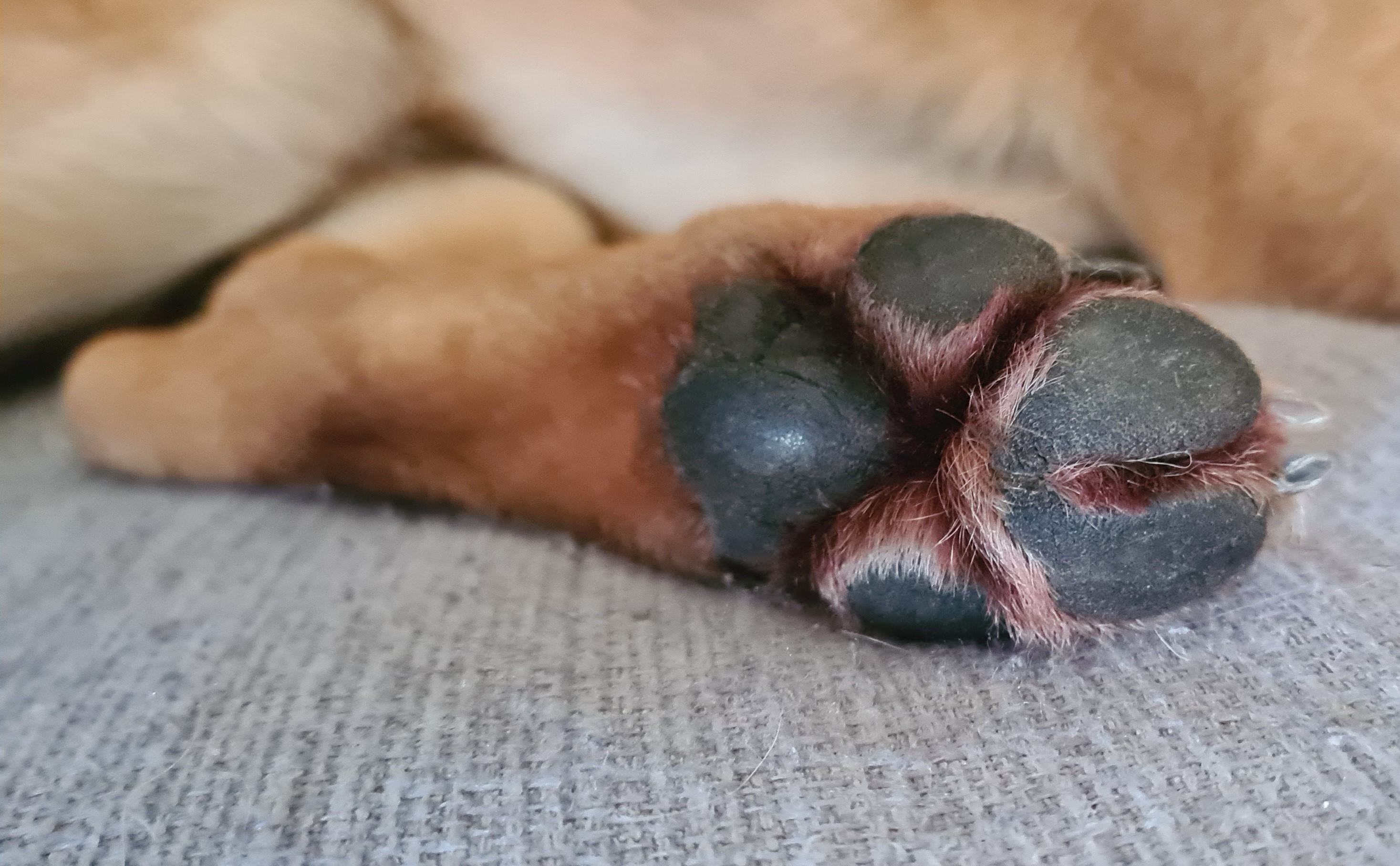
Cloven paw (conjoined paw pad) – Rear leg

== Cloven paw (conjoined paw pad) in dogs ==
Though more common in the front paws, any of the paws can be affected and whilst usually causing the animal no discomfort, there have been cases where the condition has caused issues but is easily resolved with a small operation to separate the pads.

=== Paw development ===
During the third stage of development (weeks 5-6) in the mother dog's womb, the fetus starts to rapidly grow and features like the feet and nails are developed. If there is any defect within the development at this stage, it can cause the paw pads to only partially separate resulting in the "cloven" look.
