= Burning in the Shade =

Studio album by Tygers of Pan Tang
- Released: May 1987
- Studios: Lynx Studios, Newcastle upon Tyne, UK
- Genre: Hard rock
- Length: 40:56
- Label: Zebra/Cherry Red
- Producer: Gerry Barter

Tygers of Pan Tang chronology
First Kill (1986)	Burning in the Shade (1987)	Mystical (2001)

Professional ratings
Review scores
Source	Rating
AllMusic	2/5 stars
Collector's Guide to Heavy Metal	2/10
Kerrang!	2/5 stars

Burning in the Shade is the sixth studio album by the British heavy metal band Tygers of Pan Tang, released in May 1987.

== Track listing ==
All songs by Jon Deverill, Steve Lamb, and Steve Thompson, except where indicated

Side one
No.	Title	Lyrics	Length
1.	"The First (The Only One)"	Deverill, Thompson	3:32
2.	"Hit It"		3:22
3.	"Dream Ticket"		3:53
4.	"Sweet Lies"		3:45
5.	"Maria"		4:00

Side two
No.	Title	Lyrics	Length
6.	"Hideaway"		3:45
7.	"Open to Seduction"		3:25
8.	"The Circle of the Dance"	Deverill, Thompson	3:49
9.	"Are You There?"		2:47
10.	"The Memory Fades"		7:23
11.	"Waiting" (2004 reissue bonus track)

== Personnel ==
Band members

- Jon Deverill – lead and harmony vocals
- Steve Lamb – lead and rhythm guitars, backing vocals
- Brian Dick – drums, percussion

Additional musicians

- Steve Thompson – keyboards, programming, bass
- Phil Caffrey – backing vocals

Production

- Gerry Barter – producer, engineer
- Stuart Brown, Nigel Broad – assistant engineers
