= Wild Cat (Tygers of Pan Tang album) =

Studio album by Tygers of Pan Tang
- Released: July 1980
- Recorded: Morgan Studios, London
- Genre: Heavy metal
- Length: 44:36
- Label: MCA
- Producer: Chris Tsangarides

Tygers of Pan Tang chronology
Wild Cat (1980)	Spellbound (1981)

Singles from Wild Cat
- 1. "Suzie Smiled" Released: August 1980; 2. "Euthanasia" Released: October 1980

Professional ratings
Review scores
Source	Rating
AllMusic	3/5 stars
Collector's Guide to Heavy Metal	9/10
The Encyclopedia of Popular Music	3/5 stars

Wild Cat is the debut album by the British heavy metal band Tygers of Pan Tang. It was released in 1980 on MCA Records, and reached #18 on the UK album chart. The band's debut single "Don't Touch Me There", released in January 1980, was re-recorded for inclusion. The album was re-issued in 1989 in a double-LP package with Spellbound, and on CD in 1997 with bonus tracks.

== Critical reception ==
Goldmine called the album "an early biker-metal classic exuding all the boisterous charm one would expect from a bunch of young kids excitedly helping build a scene."

== Track listing ==
All songs written by Jess Cox, Brian Dick, Rick Laws, and Robb Weir except where noted.

Side one
No.	Title	Length
1.	"Euthanasia"	3:44
2.	"Slave to Freedom"	5:55
3.	"Don't Touch Me There"	2:58
4.	"Money"	3:18
5.	"Killers"	6:36

Side two
No.	Title	Length
6.	"Fireclown"	3:15
7.	"Wild Catz"	3:06
8.	"Suzie Smiled"	5:12
9.	"Badger Badger"	4:10
10.	"Insanity"	6:26
Total length:		44:36

1997 CD re-issue bonus tracks
No.	Title	Lyrics	Length
11.	"Rock 'n' Roll Man"		2:35
12.	"Alright on the Night"		3:08
13.	"Tush" (ZZ Top cover)	Billy Gibbons, Dusty Hill, Frank Beard	2:18
14.	"Straight as a Die"		3:13
15.	"Don't Take Nothing"		3:03
16.	"Bad Times"		3:12
17.	"Burning Up"		3:58
18.	"Don't Touch Me There" (original version)		2:33
Total length:			67:36

== Personnel ==
Per the liner notes

Band members

- Jess Cox – lead vocals
- Robb Weir – guitars, backing vocals; lead vocals on "Wild Catz"
- Richard 'Rocky' Laws – bass, backing vocals
- Brian "Big" Dick – sticks, kicks and gong

Production

- Chris Tsangarides – producer, engineer
- Andrew Warwick – assistant engineer
- Cream – artwork, design
- Pete Vernon – photos

== Charts ==
Chart (1980)	Peak position
UK Albums (OCC)	18
