= Tygers of Pan Tang =

British heavy metal band

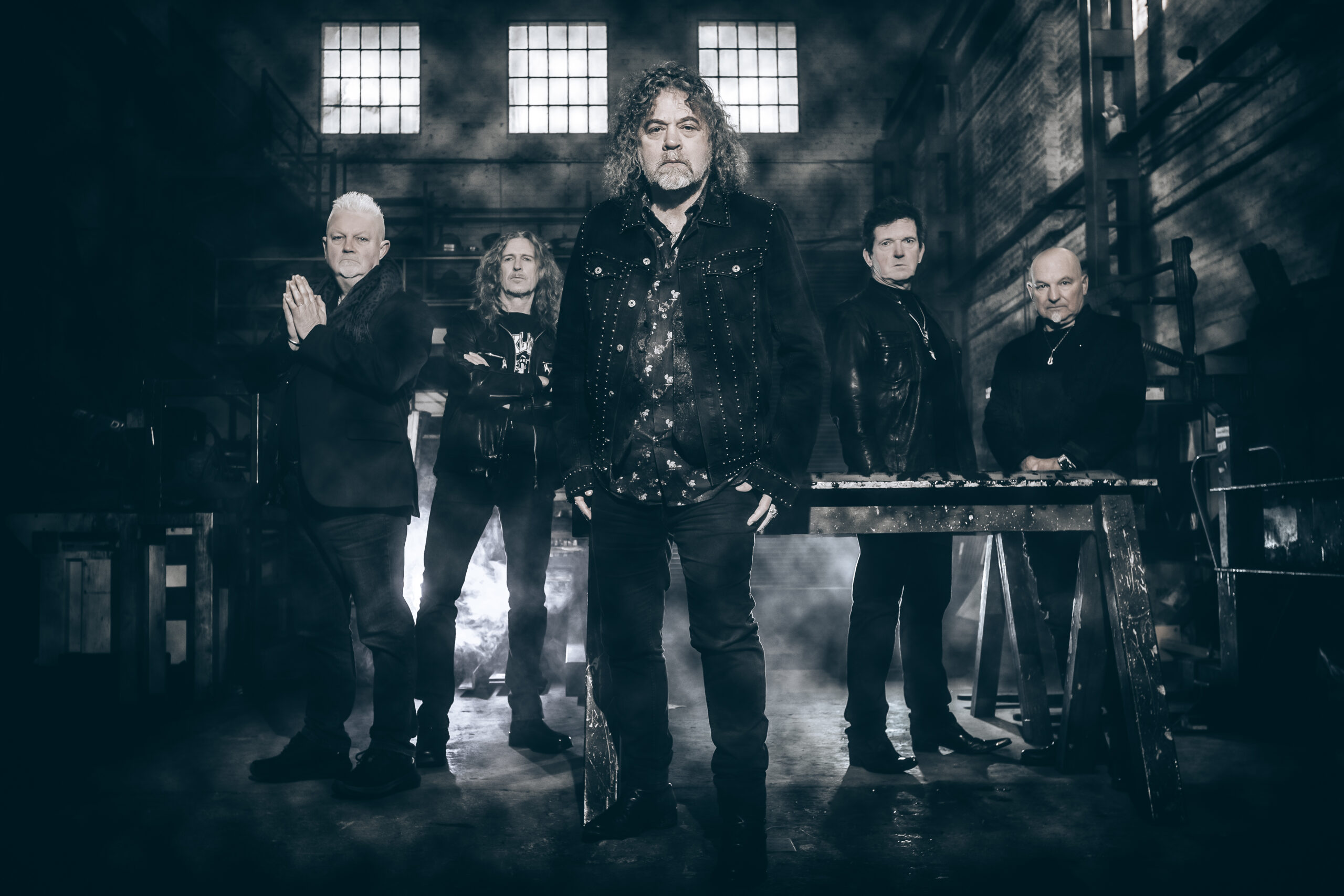
- Tygers of Pan Tang (L-R) - Robb Weir, Huw Holding,Jacopo "Jack" Meille, Craig Ellis, John Foottit

Background information
- Origin: Whitley Bay, England
- Genres: Heavy metal, hard rock
- Years active: 1978–1982; 1985–1987; 1999–present
- Labels: Neat; MCA; Music for Nations; Zebra; Spectrum; Spitfire; Z; Angel Air; Communiqué; Hallmark; Castle; Livewire
- Members: Robb Weir; Craig Ellis; Jacopo Meille; Huw Holding; John Foottit
- Website: tygersofpantang.com

Tygers of Pan Tang are an English heavy metal band that were a part of the new wave of British heavy metal movement. They formed in 1978 in Whitley Bay, England, and were active until 1987. The band reformed in 1999 and continue to record and perform. The name is derived from Pan Tang, a fictional archipelago in Michael Moorcock's Elric of Melniboné fantasy series whose wizards keep tigers as pets.

== History ==
=== Early days (1978–1983) ===
The Tygers of Pan Tang were formed by guitarist Robb Weir (born Robert Mortimer Weir, 4 May 1959, Ghana), Richard "Rocky" Laws (bass), Jess Cox (vocals) and Brian Dick (drums). They played in working men's clubs and were first signed by local independent label Neat Records before MCA gave them a major record deal. After several singles, they released their first album, Wild Cat, in 1980. The album reached No. 18 in the UK Album Chart in the first week of its release.

Subsequently John Sykes (formerly of Streetfighter, later in Badlands, Thin Lizzy, Whitesnake, and Blue Murder) was added as second guitarist. Jess Cox had a falling out with the others and quit, to be replaced by Persian Risk vocalist Jon Deverill. This lineup released Spellbound in 1981.

Sykes quit after the release of the third album, Crazy Nights, to audition for Ozzy Osbourne's band. He was replaced by ex-Penetration guitarist Fred Purser, who had to learn the set in two days before touring.

Tygers of Pan Tang's fourth album, The Cage, was released in 1982. The band then had a dispute with MCA, who were reluctant to promote the band unless they agreed to record more cover versions (following the band's hit with "Love Potion No. 9"). The band tried to terminate their contract, but MCA's release terms exceeded what other record companies were willing to pay to acquire the band. In frustration, the group chose to disband.

Jess Cox released his solo album Third Step in 1983. John Sykes later achieved success with Thin Lizzy and Whitesnake.

Songs for a new album were demoed by the same line-up which completed the previous album. It was supposed to be called Square One. The label did not approve the material and, in consequence this line-up disbanded. Songs from this aborted album were issued in 2018 under the name Purser Deverill.

=== Reformation (1985–1987) ===
In 1985, Jon Deverill and Brian Dick reformed the band with Steve Lamb (formerly of Sergeant) on guitar, Neil Sheppard on guitar, and ex-Warrior, ex-Satan member Colin Irwin on bass. Dave Donaldson later replaced Colin Irwin. Meanwhile, Robb Weir and Jess Cox formed the spin-off band Tyger-Tyger.

The reformed Tygers of Pan Tang released The Wreck-Age in summer 1985 through Music for Nations, and Burning in the Shade in 1987, through Zebra Records. Burning in the Shade received poor reviews and they disbanded again.

Various compilations and live albums were produced by the band's two first labels, Neat Records and MCA. First Kill is one such compilation album, released on vinyl in 1986 by Neat Records, then re-released on CD by Castle Classics in 1992. All the songs are live demo recordings, without overdubs, made at Impulse Studios in 1979/80 as demos by the original line-up.

=== Latter days (1999–present) ===
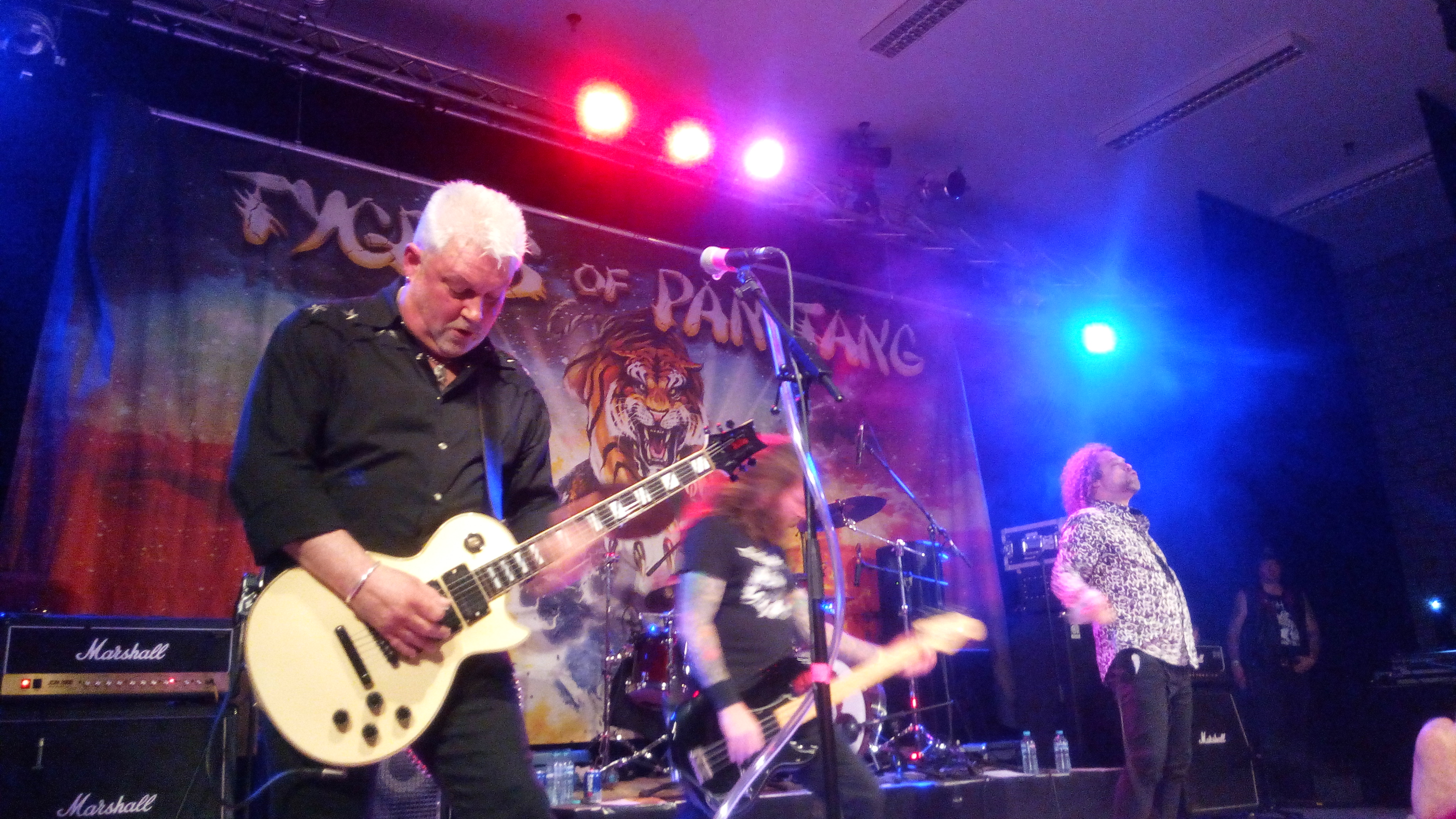
Tygers of Pan Tang performing in 2018

During the 1999 Wacken Open Air festival, Jess Cox joined on stage with Blitzkrieg, playing three Tygers songs. The audience's response was positive, and a year later, to celebrate the 20th anniversary of Tygers of Pan Tang and the 10th Wacken Open Air, the band was invited to play on the main stage. Brian Dick and Rocky were unable to join the band, but the Tygers (now Jess Cox and Robb Weir, backed up by Blitzkrieg guitarist Glenn S Howes, bassist Gavin Gray, and drummer Chris Percy) did perform. Recordings of their performance resulted in the Live at Wacken album.

In 2000, Robb Weir reformed the band as the only original member. The other musicians were Tony Liddell (vocals), Dean Robertson (lead guitar), Brian West (bass), and Craig Ellis (drums). They released Mystical through Z-Records. They toured in several festivals, but eventually were dropped by Z-Records in 2002, due to poor record sales.

The band went on to produce the split album The Second Wave: 25 Years of NWOBHM with Girlschool and Oliver/Dawson Saxon on Communique Records, and in 2004 released Noises in the Cathouse with new singer Richie Wicks who although a singer by trade was at the time still playing bass in Angel Witch.

Later that year, Richie Wicks left and was replaced by Italian vocalist Jacopo Meille. Wicks responded to the announcement of Meille in which Weir took aim at Wicks. Wicks responded to Weir on a Blabbermouth comment board commenting "I enjoyed my time with the band AT the time but it pains me to have to defend myself like this. I WILL NOT be judged by anyone from the TYGERS and will certainly not be labelled unprofessional by people no more pro than me!." Wicks later joined Shadowkeep, appearing on their 2008 album The Hourglass Effect, before leaving in 2009. As of 2010, he was the vocalist in Heavenly Hell, a Dio-era Black Sabbath tribute band, and in 2013 he commenced fronting the band Black, White & Purple with fellow ex-Angel Witch guitarist Keith Herzberg and current Praying Mantis drummer Gary MacKenzie, along with Shadowkeep's ex-bassist Mark Fielden.

Jon Deverill went on to work as an actor under the name of Jon De Ville, and as of October 2007 was performing in The Sound of Music at the London Palladium with television star Connie Fisher.

In October 2007, the band issued a limited edition five track EP titled Back and Beyond, which featured reworkings of three Tygers songs from the early 1980s, along with two new tracks taken from their forthcoming album. Animal Instinct was released on 19 May 2008, the first with vocalist Jacopo Meille. In 2011 bassist Gavin Gray returned to the band to replace Brian West. On 15 July 2011 it was announced that Tygers Of Pan Tang have signed an agreement with Rocksector Records for the worldwide release of their next studio album, with a current working title of "Ambush", provisionally planned for February/March 2012. The album came out on 24 September.

In 2013, guitarist Dean Robertson was replaced by Micky Crystal. In 2015, Jess Cox formed "Jess Cox's Tygers of Pan Tang" and made festival appearances across Europe, as well as a tour of South America. 2016 saw the band release the critically acclaimed album Tygers of Pan Tang which featured the track "Only The Brave". This was followed up in 2019 with the album that both critics and fans regard as the post-2000s jewel in the crown Ritual. In 2020, Micky Crystal left the band. Crystal stated in an interview that he had left due to poor management also claiming Robb Weir had little, to no involvement, in the band's 2019 album, Ritual. It was noted that John Sykes had expressed similar feelings in a Kerrang! interview from 1984. On 28 May 2021, the band released the compilation Majors & Minors. In 2021, bassist Gav Gray left the band and was replaced by Huw Holding.

Bloodlines was released in 2023 featuring their two new members Francesco Marras and Huw Holding. The album featured Francesco’s talents on tracks such as Edge of the World and Fire on the Horizon. This was followed by the live album, Live Blood in 2024, showcasing songs from across the band's career culminating in the Tygers returning to their original stomping ground in November 2024 for a show at the Whitley Bay Playhouse. The band made a slight change due to financial restraints and have used programmed drums on their two most recent releases Bloodlines and Electrifyed however drummer Craig Ellis still remains the bands drummer for live shows.

In January 2026 John Footitt replaced Francesco Marras and the album Electrifyed was released in 2026 featuring producer Marco Angioni and John Footitt on guitars. The band noted that they were going for a heavier sound and whilst reviews were generally positive more critical reviews stated that it was “miscalculated” and relying on “monotonous mid tempo chugging and worn out metal tropes.”

== Members ==
Current members

- Robb Weir – guitar, backing vocals (1978–1982, 1999–present)
- Craig Ellis – drums, percussion, backing vocals (2000–present)
- Jacopo "Jack" Meille – lead vocals (2004–present)
- Huw Holding – bass (2021–present)
- John Foottit – guitar (2026–present)

Jess Cox Tygers of Pan Tang

- Jess Cox – vocals (2015–present)

== Discography ==
=== Studio albums ===
- Wild Cat (1980)
- Spellbound (1981)
- Crazy Nights (1981)
- The Cage (1982)
- The Wreck-Age (1985)
- Burning in the Shade (1987)
- Mystical (2001)
- Noises from the Cathouse (2004)
- Animal Instinct (2008)
- Ambush (2012)
- Tygers of Pan Tang (2016)
- Ritual (2019)
- Bloodlines (2023)
- Electrifyed (2026)

=== Compilation albums ===
- Tygers of Pan Tang – 1982
- The Best of Tygers of Pan Tang – 1984
- First Kill – 1986
- Hellbound – 1989
- Singles – 1992
- On the Prowl: The Best Of – 1999
- Detonated – 2005
- Big Game Hunting (The Rarities) – 2005
- Bad Bad Kitty – 2005
- Majors & Minors - 2021

=== Live albums ===
- BBC in Concert – 1981
- Live at Wacken – 2001
- Live at Nottingham Rock City – 2001
- Live in the Roar – 2003
- Leg of the Boot: Live in Holland – 2005
- Live Blood – 2024

=== EPs ===
- Back and Beyond (2007)
- The Wildcat Sessions (2010)
- The Spellbound Sessions (2011)
- The Crazy Nights Sessions (30th Anniversary Special Edition) (2014)
- A New Heartbeat (2022)

=== Singles ===
- "Don't Touch Me There" / "Burning Up" / "Bad Times" – 1980
- "Rock 'N' Roll Man" / "All Right on the Night" / "Wild Cats" – 1980
- "Suzie Smiled" / "Tush" – 1980
- "Euthanasia" / "Straight as a Die" – 1980
- "Don't Stop By" / "Slave to Freedom" (live) / "Raised on Rock" (live) – 1981
- "Hellbound" / "Don't Give a Damn" / "Don't Take Nothing" / "Bad Times" – 1981 – No. 48 UK
- "The Story So Far" / "Silver and Gold" / "All or Nothing" – 1981
- "Love Don't Stay" / "Paradise Drive" – 1981
- "Do It Good" / "Slip Away" – 1982
- "Making Tracks" / "What You Sayin'" – 1982
- "Paris By Air" / "Love's a Lie" – 1982 – No. 63 UK
- "Rendezvous" / "Life of Crime" – 1982 – No. 49 UK
- "Love Potion No. 9" / "The Stormlands" – 1982 – No. 45 UK
- "Lonely at the Top" / "You Always See What You Want" – 1983
- "Only the Brave" - 2016
- "White Lines" / "Don't Touch Me There" - 2019
- "Rock Candy" - 2024

=== Music videos ===
- "Love Potion No.9" (1982) From the album "The Cage"
- "Waiting" (1985) From the album "The Wreck-Age"
- "Mystical" (2001) From the album "Mystical"
- "She" (2012) From the album "Ambush"
- "Keeping Me Alive" (2012) From the album "Ambush"
- "Only the Brave" (2016) From the album "Tygers Of Pan Tang"
- "Destiny" (2019) From the Album "Ritual"
- "White Lines" (2019) From the album "Ritual"
- "Art Of Noise" (2019) From the album "Ritual"
- "A New Heartbeat" (2022) From the EP "A New Heartbeat"
- "Edge Of The World" (2023) From the album "Bloodlines"
- "Back For Good" (2023) From the album "Bloodlines"
- "Electrifyed" (2026)

=== Lyrics videos ===
- "Let It Burn" (2021) From the album "Animal Instinct"
- "Damn You!" (2019) From the album "Ritual"
- "Fire On The Horizon" (2023) From the album "Bloodlines"

== See also ==
- List of new wave of British heavy metal bands
