= Lee Payne (bassist) =

British musician and songwriter

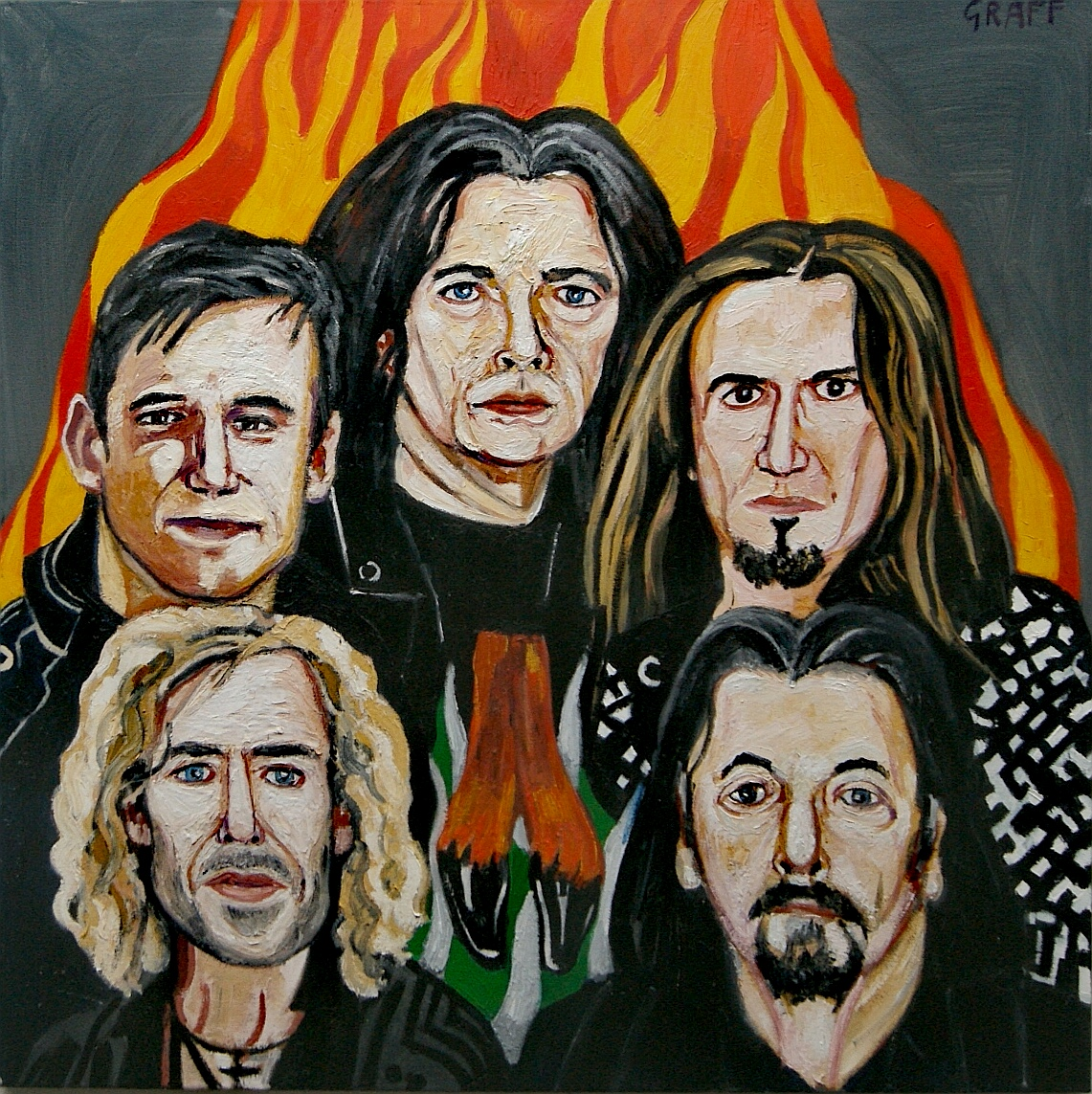
- Lee Payne (centre) and Cloven Hoof, painting by Matthias Laurenz Gräff, 2019

Background information
- Also known as: Lee "Air" Payne
- Born: Lee Andre Barry Payne; 15 June 1960 (age 66); Wednesbury, England
- Genres: Heavy metal, power metal
- Occupations: Bassist, songwriter
- Instruments: Guitar, Bass guitar, vocals
- Years active: 1979–present
- Member of: Cloven Hoof
- Website: Clovenhoof

Lee Payne (born Lee Andre Barry Payne; 15 June 1960, in Wednesbury, England) is the founding bassist and main songwriter of the British heavy metal/power metal band Cloven Hoof. Payne is a self-taught musician and is the only member of Cloven Hoof to feature in every line-up of the band to date.

He started playing guitar at age of 17, but eventually switched to bass. His creative mind was and still is influenced by horror movies and science fiction. Payne cites Chris Squire and Geddy Lee as his main musical influences.

Cloven Hoof was originally formed in the heart of the West Midlands, England in 1979. The group went through various line up changes until spring 1982 when the band line-up consisted of Payne on bass guitar, David Potter on vocals, Steve Rounds on lead guitar, and Kevin Poutney on drums.

In the early days of Cloven Hoof the members, in keeping with their science fiction theme, used one of the four elements as a pseudonym - Payne's was Air, but since the dissolution of the band's first stable line-up in the mid 1980s they decided to drop the stage names.

== Gear ==
On Stage: Spector Rex R5- Ampeg SVT Pro2 head and Ampeg Speakers - Roland GP5 Digital Bass Pedals - Triton Module

In the home studio: Gibson Les Paul Custom guitar - Fender USA Stratocaster - Line 6 Acoustic guitar - Line 6 Spider Guitar processor - Pro-tools G4 Apple mac system - Tascam Mixing desk - SM 58 Mike - Alesis Quadraverb - Boss compressor - Korg M1 Keyboard - Line 6 Bass Pod, sitar, bongo drums, penny whistle and an array of bird whistles.
