= German, French + Rare Recordings =

1990 compilation album of The Searchers

Compilation album by The Searchers
- Released: 1990
- Recorded: 1964–1969
- Genre: Rock/Pop
- Languages: English, German, French
- Label: Repertoire Records
- Producers: Tony Hatch, Kenny Young, Peter Collins

German, French + Rare Recordings is the German compilation album by English rock band The Searchers. The collection includes their hits as "Needles and Pins", "Don't Throw Your Love Away" or "When You Walk In The Room" sung in German and French and is a complete catalogue of their singles and rarities issued on Liberty Records in the sixties (songs that were never released on CD or LP before). This was the band's second rarities album, the former being The Searchers Play The System – Rarities, Oddities & Flipsides, which was released in 1987.

== Overview ==
The album came out in 1990 on Repertoire Records (on vinyl LP and CD simultaneously). It was compiled by Wilfried Zinzow, who worked on many collectors editions for this label. In addition to the songs mentioned above, there is the last Searchers’ British single "I Don't Want To Be The One" / "Hollywood", Chris Curtis’ solo single "Aggravation" / "Have I Done Something Wrong" (including session work by Jimmy Page or John Paul Jones) or "Medley" of their hits (released only in Spain as a B-side to "Goodbye My Love" in 1981). According to the sleeve note, as some original master tapes were no more available, few tracks have been cut from vintage vinyl records.

== Track listing ==
Side 1
| No. | Title | Writer(s) | Originally released | Length |
|---|---|---|---|---|
| 1. | "I Don't Want To Be The One" | Steve Thompson | A-side single, 1982 | 3:46 |
| 2. | "Hollywood" | Mike Pender, John McNally, Frank Allen | B-side "I Don't Want To Be The One", 1982 | 3:53 |
| 3. | "Süß ist sie": "(Sugar and Spice in German)" | Fred Nightingale | A-side single, 1964, Germany | 2:15 |
| 4. | "Liebe": "(Money in German)" | Janie Bradford, Berry Gordy | B-side "Süß ist sie", 1964, Germany | 2:48 |
| 5. | "Tausend Nadelstiche": "(Needles and Pins in German)" | Sonny Bono, Jack Nitzsche | A-side single, 1964, Germany | 2:12 |
| 6. | "Farmer John": "(Farmer John in German)" | Don Harris, Dewey Terry | B-side "Tausend Nadelstiche", 1964, Germany | 1:59 |
| 7. | "Verzeih' My Love": "(Goodbye My Love in German)" | Robert Mosley, Lamar Simington, Leroy Swearingen | A-side single, 1965, Germany | 2:53 |
| 8. | "Wenn ich dich seh'": "(When You Walk In The Room in German)" | Jackie DeShannon | B-side "Verzeih' My Love", 1965, Germany | 2:23 |
| 9. | "Mais C’etait Un Rêve": "(It's All Been a Dream in French)" | Chris Curtis (Translator: Alain Gaunay) | EP "Les Searchers Chantent En Français", 1964, France | 1:49 |
| 10. | "C’est Arrivé Comme Ça": "(Don't Throw Your Love Away in French)" | Billy Jackson, Jimmy Wisner (Translator: Bernard Michel) | EP "Les Searchers Chantent En Français", 1964, France | 2:17 |
| 11. | "C'est De Notre Age": "(Sugar and Spice in French)" | Fred Nightingale (Translator: Michel Paje) | EP "Les Searchers Chantent En Français", 1964, France | 2:17 |
| 12. | "Ils la Chantaient Il y a Longtemps": "(Saints and Searchers in French)" | Traditional; arranged by The Searchers (Translator: Alain Gaunay) | EP "Les Searchers Chantent En Français", 1964, France | 3:18 |

Side 2
| No. | Title | Writer(s) | Originally released | Length |
|---|---|---|---|---|
| 13. | "Have I Done Something Wrong" | Chris Curtis | Chris Curtis solo, B-side "Aggravation", 1966 | 2:42 |
| 14. | "Aggravation" | Joe South | Chris Curtis solo, A-side single, 1966 | 2:02 |
| 15. | "I'll Be Doggone": "(alternate version, vocal: Chris Curtis)" | Smokey Robinson, Warren Moore, Marv Tarplin | US LP "The Searchers No. 4" | 2:54 |
| 16. | "Medley": "Needles and Pins"; "Sweets for My Sweet"; "Sugar And Spice"; "Have You Ever Loved Somebody" | various: Sonny Bono, Jack Nitzsche; Doc Pomus, Mort Shuman; Fred Nightingale; Allan Clarke, Graham Nash, Tony Hicks | B-side "Goodbye My Love", 1981, Spain | 3:32 |
| 17. | "Umbrella Man" | Kenny Young | A-side single, 1968 | 2:59 |
| 18. | "Over the Weekend" | Frank Allen | B-side single "Umbrella Man", 1968 | 2:30 |
| 19. | "Shoot 'em Up Baby" | Jeff Barry | A-side single, 1969 | 2:29 |
| 20. | "Suzanna" | John McNally | B-side single "Shoot 'em Up Baby", 1969 | 2:44 |
| 21. | "Kinky Kathy Abernathy" | Kenny Young | A-side single, 1969 | 2:55 |
| 22. | "Somebody Shot The Lollypop Man" | Kenny Young | A-side single, 1969, released under the name Pasha | 2:44 |
| 23. | "Pussy Willow Dragon" | Kenny Young | B-side single "Somebody Shot The Lollypop Man", 1969 | 2:09 |
| 24. | "Shoot 'em Up Baby (Extended Version)" | Jeff Barry | unknown | 2:48 |

== Personnel ==
The Searchers

- Mike Pender – lead guitar, lead vocals, backing vocals
- John McNally – rhythm guitar, lead and backing vocals
- Tony Jackson – bass guitar, lead and backing vocals
- Chris Curtis – drums, lead and backing vocals
- Frank Allen – bass guitar, lead and backing vocals
- John Blunt – drums
- Billy Adamson – drums

Additional musicians and production

- Tony Hatch – producer (3–12, 15, 16), piano
- Kenny Young – producer (17–24)
- Peter Collins – producer (1, 2)
- Accompaniment directed by Johnny Harris (13, 14)
- Jimmy Page – guitar (13, 14)
- Joe Moretti – guitar (13, 14)
- John Paul Jones – bass guitar (13, 14)
- Vic Flick – guitar (13, 14)
- Bobby Graham – drums (13, 14)
