= Second Take =

Studio album by The Searchers
- Released: November 1972
- Recorded: 1972
- Genre: Rock/Pop
- Label: RCA Victor
- Producers: The Searchers, David Paramor

The Searchers chronology
Take Me for What I'm Worth (1965)	Second Take (1972)	Searchers (1979)

Singles from Second Take
- 1. "Desdemona" Released: 26 February 1971

International edition (1974)
- Needles & Pins (RCA)

Second Take is the sixth studio album by the English rock band The Searchers and the first with drummer Billy Adamson. The album consists of re-recordings of their earlier hits as well as their last US hit single "Desdemona" from the previous year. Guitarist and vocalist Mike Pender takes the lead as singer on all the tracks. Second Take is also the band's first self-produced album.

== Overview ==
"Desdemona" brought the Searchers back into the charts in the summer and autumn of 1971. Single entered the US Billboard Hot 100, reached No. 94 and stayed for three weeks. On Cashbox went even higher to No. 79. and the song reached No. 28 on Detroit's radio "Keener 13" hitparade (WKNR). So it had been successful enough for RCA Victor to release new album by the group. Although the band had some strong new material ("Love Is Everywhere", "The World Is Waiting for Tomorrow"), they set about re-recording 10 hits of their Pye Records-era and featured only two songs that were originally released on RCA singles "Come On Back to Me" (B-side of "Sing Singer Sing") and of course "Desdemona". "We did the remakes because we wanted to clear the path to recording some newer stuff, but I don’t think RCA was ever interested in anything but the old hits,” said guitarist John McNally. "Second Take" was issued in November 1972 on RCA Victor SF 8298. Despite the success of "Desdemona" in the US, the only other countries that released the LP were Germany and South Africa.

== International version (Needles & Pins) ==
Although the album didn't chart, RCA give the second chance to it and released new version on their budget label RCA International on July 6, 1974. This time under the title "Needles & Pins" and with the new cover art. The LP failed to chart again. Moreover, Pye Records (who released compilation LP "The Golden Hour Of The Searchers" in the same year) checking the contracts and realized that the Searchers could not re-record the old hits for another company. RCA eventually settled and paid Pye an override.

== Track listing ==
Side 1
No.	Title	Writer(s)	Length
1.	"Sugar and Spice"	Fred Nightingale	2:25
2.	"Don't Throw Your Love Away"	Jimmy Wisner, Billy Jackson	2:19
3.	"Farmer John"	Don "Sugarcane" Harris, Dewey Terry	2:28
4.	"Come On Back to Me"	Mike Pender, John McNally, Frank Allen	3:36
5.	"When You Walk in the Room"	Jackie DeShannon	2:42
6.	"Needles and Pins"	Jack Nitzsche, Sonny Bono	2:20

Side 2
No.	Title	Writer(s)	Length
7.	"Desdemona"	Valerie Avon, Harold Spiro	2:21
8.	"Goodbye My Love"	Robert Mosley, Lamar Simington, Leroy Swearingen	2:40
9.	"Love Potion No. 9"	Jerry Leiber and Mike Stoller	1:57
10.	"Sweets for My Sweet"	Doc Pomus, Mort Shuman	2:25
11.	"Take Me For What I'm Worth"	P. F. Sloan	2:35
12.	"What Have They Done to the Rain"	Malvina Reynolds	2:32

== Personnel ==
The Searchers

- Mike Pender – lead guitar, lead vocals
- John McNally – rhythm guitar, vocals
- Frank Allen – bass, vocals
- Billy Adamson – drums

Additional musicians and production

- David Paramor – producer ("Desdemona" only)
