= Searchers (The Searchers album) =

Studio album by The Searchers
- Released: October 1979
- Recorded: April – July 1979
- Studios: Rockfield Studios, Wales, UK
- Genre: Rock/Pop
- Length: 33:23
- Label: Sire
- Producer: Pat Moran

The Searchers chronology
Second Take (1972)	Searchers (1979)	Play for Today (1981)

Singles from Searchers
- 1. "Hearts In Her Eyes" Released: October 1979

Alternate UK cover art (1980)
- The Searchers (Sire re-edition)

Searchers (the definite article is omitted in the UK) is the seventh studio album by the English rock band The Searchers, sometimes referred to as the band’s comeback album. It is the Searchers' first album of original songs since their 1965 Take Me for What I'm Worth and the first which entered Billboard Top 200 since The Searchers No. 4. The album contained original songs written by Tom Petty ("Lost In Your Eyes"), Bob Dylan ("Coming From The Heart") and The Records ("Hearts In Her Eyes") and featured guest appearances by Bob Jackson, ex-Badfinger, on keyboards.

== Overview and recording ==
During the 1970s, the popularity of the Searchers declined on both sides of the Atlantic, but they carried on, playing the clubs, touring Europe, America and Australia. The band was performing old hits as well as contemporary new songs. After leaving RCA Records they had no recording deal at all, but then, in late 1978, signed to Sire to cut a new album. As Mike Pender wrote in his autobiography: "It was a breath of fresh air for the band." Sire employee Paul McNally (no relation to band's guitarist John McNally) recommended the change of a drummer. The Searchers refused to fire Billy Adamson but finally went along with replacing him for upcoming recording session. The album was recorded at the residential Rockfield Studios (most notable clients of the time were Hawkwind, Black Sabbath, Dave Edmunds or Queen) in six weeks from April to July 1979. Mike Pender sings lead on all tracks except "Don’t Hang On" which is sung by Frank Allen. It is also the first album where McNally took over as lead guitarist while Pender switched to rhythm guitar (mainly the Rickenbacker electric 12-string). Session drummer Martin Hughes played the drums instead of Billy Adamson.

== Release and reception ==
The album was widely acclaimed by British rock music press and it was considered to be as contemporary as any album released that year, but failed to chart in the UK. In the US was album titled as "The Searchers". It entered the Billboard Top 200 LP charts on 15 March 1980 went to No. 191 and stayed for 2 weeks. The opening track "Hearts In Her Eyes", written by John Wicks and Will Birch, was given to the band by The Records (their version appeared later on the group's second UK album Crashes) and was released as a single b/w "Don’t Hang On", but unfortunately missed the charts. The album Searchers charted also in Sweden (No.32) and Germany (No.28).

== Re-release in the UK ==
Sales of the album in the UK were weak, so the album was re-released in England after a few months in 1980 with new cover art. It featured a remixed version of "It's Too Late" and three new songs: "Love's Melody" (title track of their next US album), "Silver" (which would subsequently appear on their 1981 UK album, Play for Today), and "Back To The War" (which would later be used as a B-side of song "Another Night"). The track "Coming From The Heart" from the first LP release is omitted. Title on the label and cover of this reissue is "The Searchers" (this time with "The" in the title).

== Track listing ==
Side 1
No.	Title	Writer(s)	Length
1.	"Hearts in Her Eyes"	John Wicks, Will Birch	3:19
2.	"Switchboard Susan"	Mickey Jupp	3:53
3.	"Feeling Fine"	John David	3:20
4.	"This Kind Of Love Affair"	Mike Pender, John McNally, Frank Allen	2:57
5.	"Lost In Your Eyes"	Tom Petty	4:25

Side 2
No.	Title	Writer(s)	Length
6.	"It's Too Late"	John David	3:28
7.	"No Dancing"	Noel Brown	2:51
8.	"Coming From The Heart"	Bob Dylan	3:44
9.	"Don't Hang On"	Frank Allen, John McNally, Mike Pender	2:28
10.	"Love's Gonna Be Strong"	Ronnie Thomas	2:58

== Personnel ==
The Searchers

- Mike Pender – lead vocals, rhythm guitar
- John McNally – lead guitar, vocals
- Frank Allen – bass, vocals
- Billy Adamson – drums (note: according to Pender's and Allen's autobiographies, Martin Hughes did all of the drumming)

Additional musicians and production

- Martin Hughes – Drums, percussion
- Bob Jackson – Keyboards (on "Lost In Your Eyes" and "Coming From The Heart")
- Pat Moran – Record producer
- Ted Sharp – Mixing Engineer ("It's Too Late" remixed by Ed Stasium)
