= Hungry Hearts (The Searchers album) =

Studio album by The Searchers
- Released: 1988
- Recorded: 1988
- Studios: Coconut Studio (Hennef), Music Park Studios (Bad Homburg), Klangwerkstatt (Düsseldorf)
- Genre: Rock/pop
- Label: Coconut
- Producers: Tony Hendrik, Karin Hartmann, Hans Steingen, Theo Werdin, Levy

The Searchers chronology
Play for Today (1981)	Hungry Hearts (1988)

Singles from Searchers
- 1. "Forever In Love" Released: October 1988; 2. "No Other Love" Released: 1989; 3. "Needles and Pins ’89" Released: 1989

Hungry Hearts is the ninth and final studio album by the British group The Searchers and the group's only LP featuring new lead vocalist and guitarist Spencer James. The album was released only in West Germany and Benelux. It contained mainly new original material (half of the songs were written by the band members).

== Overview ==
1985 marked a big change for the Searchers. Disillusioned Mike Pender, co-founder of the band, lead singer and guitarist, left and was replaced by Spencer James, who previously had success with The First Class (famous for their hit single Beach Baby). The band toured again and their long-term success in Germany secured them a new record contract with the German company Coconut Records. "It was great to get the chance to marry new technology with our old harmonies and sound," said Frank Allen for BBC few years later. "That worked out pretty well." Once for the last time, the band tried to find a way to the young generation and recorded an album in a modern style with a specific eighties sound incl. additional work on keyboards and synthesizer. But while young listeners were not interested in their new music, their longtime fans were a little discouraged by the modern sound.

== Recording and release ==
The album was recorded mainly at Coconut Studio in Hennef near Bonn. Spencer James sang lead on all tracks except "Every Little Tear" and "Baby, I Do" sung by Frank Allen, several German musicians were also guests in the studio. Not having the time available to spend an extended period in a studio, they resorted to completing the work in a manner they had never tried before. "Basic computer-generated drum tracks were laid down ahead of our arrival by our appointed producer, Hans Steingen, along with synthesised string and keyboard pads to provide a bedrock on which we could add our own contribution," wrote Frank Allen in his autobiography. "Guitars, both six string and twelve string, were layered on top of the prepared tracks followed by lead voices and harmonies which naturally incorporated the trademarks of our long-established sound."

Record was finished in 1988, but did not appear in stores until 1989. Hungry Hearts was the first Searchers album to be released on LP and CD simultaneously, three singles helped to promote album in Germany: "Forever In Love" (released in October 1988), "No Other Love" and a new version of their classic hit "Needles and Pins" (both in 1989). The Searchers filmed a video clip for "Forever In Love" and promoted it on the German television. Unfortunately, neither the album nor the singles met with commercial success and did not make the charts in Germany (and was not even released in the UK or the US). Despite the album's failure, a couple of songs have been added to setlist for The Searchers' live shows.

Although the band was active until 2025 and released several low-cost concert albums, Hungry Hearts remained their last studio album.

== Track listing ==
Side 1
No.	Title	Writer(s)	Length
1.	"Forever In Love (Near To Heaven)"	Tony Hendrik, Karin van Haaren	4:06
2.	"Love Lies Bleeding"	John McNally, Frank Allen, Spencer James	4:08
3.	"Lonely Weekend"	Tony Hendrik, Karin van Haaren	3:35
4.	"Somebody Told Me"	Bob Carlisle, Randy Thomas	3:32
5.	"Every Little Tear"	John McNally, Frank Allen, Spencer James	3:46
6.	"Sweets For My Sweet (new version)"	Doc Pomus, Mort Shuman	3:10

Side 2
No.	Title	Writer(s)	Length
7.	"No Other Love"	Tony Hendrik, Karin van Haaren	3:38
8.	"This Boy's In Love"	John McNally, Frank Allen, Spencer James	3:28
9.	"Fooled Myself Once Again"	John McNally, Frank Allen, Spencer James	4:10
10.	"Baby, I Do"	John McNally, Frank Allen, Spencer James, Tony Hendrik	3:42
11.	"Push, Push"	John McNally, Frank Allen, Spencer James	3:52
12.	"Needles and Pins (new version)"	Sonny Bono, Jack Nitzsche	3:58

== Personnel ==
The Searchers

- Spencer James – lead vocals, lead guitar, rhythm guitar
- John McNally – lead and rhythm guitar, vocals
- Frank Allen – bass, vocals
- Billy Adamson – drums

Additional musicians and production

- Vocals – Chris Baker (tracks: 6, 12)
- Backing Vocals – Stefan Scheuß (track: 9), Elke Schlimbach (track: 11)
- Guitar – Pete Brough (track: 9), Robby Musenbichler (tracks: 6, 12), Stefan Scheuß (track: 11)
- Keyboards – Harry Baierl (track: 12), Hazel Stoner (track: 6), Hans Steingen (various tracks), George Kochbeck (various tracks)
- Mixed By – Gary Jones (tracks: 1, 3, 7, 10)
- Producer – Tony Hendrik and Karin Hartmann (tracks: 1, 3, 7, 10), Hans Steingen (tracks: 2, 5, 9, 11), Levy (track: 4), Theo Werdin (tracks: 6, 12)
