= The Iron Door Sessions =

Live album by The Searchers
- Released: April 2002
- Recorded: 1963
- Genre: Rock/Pop
- Label: Castle

The Iron Door Sessions is a compilation live album by English rock band The Searchers. It contains acetate recordings of them performing at Iron Door Club in 1963, few months before their breakthrough in the UK. The Searchers re-recorded some of these tracks in the studio later and issued on their albums or singles (incl. hit versions of Sweets for My Sweet or "Ain't That Just Like Me"). Traditional Maggie May is the same song made famous by The Beatles.

== Overview ==
The Iron Door club (situated at 13 Temple Street, Liverpool) played the same role in the Searchers’ career as the Cavern Club did for The Beatles. It was a small music club in Liverpool managed by Les Ackerley, manager of the Searchers at the time, and it was the venue where their UK popularity started. Around January or February 1963, the Searchers taped here eleven songs from their current stage repertoire (without audience). The tape was then converted into a small number of acetates. Guitarist John McNally: "I can't remember how many copies of the acetate were made, although Les Ackerley obviously had a few to send to the record companies in London. I don't remember ever having one myself – it didn't seem important at the time." Tony Hatch, who worked as a producer and A&R man for Pye Records, was impressed enough to invite the band down to London for a test in Pye's recording studios on Marble Arch. There The Searchers recorded Sweets for My Sweet, which became their first single and the first No. 1 hit.

== Rerelease ==
It was believed, that these Iron Door acetate records were lost, but it turns out that the only surviving copy was in the private collection of Tony Jackson, singer and bass guitarist of the band. These were released on Castle Records (Sanctuary Records) CD in 2002.

== Track listing ==
Side 1
No.	Title	Writer(s)	Lead vocals	Length
1.	"Sweets for My Sweet"	Doc Pomus, Mort Shuman	Tony Jackson	2:23
2.	"All My Sorrows"	Glenn Yarborough	Mike Pender, Chris Curtis	3:21
3.	"Jambalaya"	Hank Williams	Mike Pender	2:34
4.	"Rosalie"	Fats Domino, Dave Bartholomew	John McNally	2:27
5.	"Darling Do You Miss Me: note: later re-recorded as "I'll Be Missing You""	Chris Curtis	Chris Curtis	1:58
6.	"Maybellene"	Chuck Berry	Chris Curtis	2:12
7.	"Sho' Know A Lot About Love"	Gary S. Paxton, Buddy Mize	Tony Jackson, Mike Pender	2:10
8.	"Maggie May"	traditional, arr. The Searchers	John McNally	1:41
9.	"Let's Stomp"	Jerry Goldstein, Richard Gottehrer, Bob Feldman	Tony Jackson	2:06
10.	"Ain't That Just Like Me"	Earl Carroll (vocalist), Billy Guy	Chris Curtis, Tony Jackson, Mike Pender	1:40
11.	"Sweet Little Sixteen"	Chuck Berry	Mike Pender	2:10

== Personnel ==
The Searchers

- Mike Pender – lead guitar, lead vocals, backing vocals
- John McNally – rhythm guitar, lead and backing vocals
- Tony Jackson – bass guitar, lead and backing vocals
- Chris Curtis – drums, lead and backing vocals
