= Take Me for What I'm Worth =

1965 studio album by The Searchers

Studio album by The Searchers
- Released: 26 November 1965
- Recorded: 1965
- Studios: Pye Studios, London
- Genre: Rock/Pop/Folk
- Label: Pye
- Producer: Tony Hatch

The Searchers chronology
Sounds Like Searchers (1965)	Take Me for What I'm Worth (1965)	Second Take (1972)

Singles from Take Me for What I'm Worth
- 1. "Take Me for What I'm Worth" Released: November 1965

Take Me for What I'm Worth is the fifth studio album by the English rock band The Searchers and the group's first LP which missed the official Record Retailer Top 20 album chart in the United Kingdom. Released in the end of 1965 it was the last album by the Searchers before the leader of the band Chris Curtis left. Album included some songs written by members of the band as well as cover versions of some well known tracks originally recorded by The Ronettes ("Be My Baby"), Fats Domino ("I’m Ready"), Marvin Gaye ("I'll Be Doggone") or Ian and Sylvia ("Four Strong Winds"). The title track, written by P. F. Sloan, was the last Top 20 hit for the band in the UK.

== Overview and recording ==
Sessions for Take Me for What I'm Worth LP began in May 1965 at Pye Studios. There were reports in the press at the same time, that The Beatles manager Brian Epstein would take over the group, but this did not happen. In fact, Epstein probably wouldn't be able to help the band with commercial success because nearly all of his merseybeat bands (included Gerry and the Pacemakers, Billy J. Kramer and the Dakotas, The Fourmost etc.) had the same problems with waning popularity in 1965. Still, Frank Allen said: "Eppy would have had the clout to do more for us, but what we really needed was control in the studio. We made nice records, but we were losing our way," and he added: "We didn't take enough care finishing the records off."

Chris Curtis take over direction of the band previous year. He picked up (or wrote) and arranged the most songs and he also found P. J. Proby's "Take Me for What I'm Worth" which became their Top 20 hit and the title track of this album. He loved both the melody and the lyrics of the song: "It’s a very profound statement and it could have become a gay anthem," said in interview with Spencer Leigh. John McNally's songwriting would evolve over the years and flourish with interesting compositions. As a songwriter, he has contributed with two songs to the record "It's Time' and "Don't You Know Why". One more self-penned number featured on the album, band's lyrical composition with the beautiful flute solo "Too Many Miles" (the song was primarily written by Chris Curtis). During these sessions, out-take version of the Marvin Gaye hit was made: an alternate "I'll Be Doggone" with Chris Curtis on lead vocals (released only on US LP The Searchers No. 4).

Although the album was completed very soon, it stayed in the vaults for another five months and it was not released until the end of the year. This could have had a major impact on the album's failure, because the British music scene was evolving very fast at that time.

== Release ==
Take Me for What I'm Worth was released as a mono LP album on the Pye label with the catalogue number NPL 18120 and as a stereo album NSPL 18120 but failed to chart (Record Retailer printed only the Top 20 album chart in 1965).

== Track listing ==
Side 1
No.	Title	Writer(s)	Lead vocals	Length
1.	"I'm Ready"	Fats Domino, Al Lewis, Sylvester Bradford	Chris Curtis	1:54
2.	"I'll Be Doggone"	Smokey Robinson, Warren Moore, Marv Tarplin	Frank Allen	2:54
3.	"Does She Really Care for Me"	Larry Weiss, Fred Anisfield	Chris Curtis	2:07
4.	"It's Time"	John McNally	John McNally	2:34
5.	"Too Many Miles"	Mike Pender, Chris Curtis, John McNally, Frank Allen	Mike Pender	2:08
6.	"You Can't Lie to a Liar"	Frank Churchill, Lionel Hampton	Mike Pender	2:22

Side 2
No.	Title	Writer(s)	Lead vocals	Length
1.	"Don't You Know Why"	John McNally	Mike Pender	2:38
2.	"I'm Your Loving Man"	Mike Pender, Chris Curtis	Mike Pender, Chris Curtis	1:57
3.	"Each Time"	Jackie DeShannon	Mike Pender, Chris Curtis	2:46
4.	"Be My Baby"	Jeff Barry, Ellie Greenwich, Phil Spector	Frank Allen	3:16
5.	"Four Strong Winds"	Ian Tyson	Mike Pender, Chris Curtis	3:07
6.	"Take Me for What I'm Worth"	P. F. Sloan	Mike Pender	2:40

== The First US version (The Searchers No. 4) ==
The Searchers No. 4

Studio album by The Searchers
- Released: September 1965
- Recorded: 1965
- Studios: Pye Studios, London
- Genre: Rock/Pop/Folk
- Label: Kapp
- Producer: Tony Hatch

The Searchers US chronology
The New Searchers LP (Chris, John, Mike, Frank) (1965)	The Searchers No. 4 (1965)	Take Me for What I'm Worth (1966)

Singles from The Searchers No. 4
- 1. "Goodbye My Love" Released: March 1965; 2. "He's Got No Love" Released: July 1965; 3. "You Can’t Lie To a Liar" Released: October 1965

In September 1965 (prior to UK release), Kapp Records released the first US version of the LP, as The Searchers No. 4, with a different cover art and with a slightly different track listing. Kapp removed "I'm Ready", "It's Time", "Too Many Miles" and "Take Me For What I'm Worth" and added the hit singles Goodbye My Love and He's Got No Love (as well as the group's self-penned B-sides "Till I Met You" and "So Far Away"). Early front covers incorrectly show a song titled "Can't You Just See Me", later correct this to "I'm Your Lovin' Man". Album entered the Billboard Top 200 LP charts on 23 October 1965, went to No. 149 and stayed for 2 weeks. The opening track "You Can't Lie To a Liar" was released as a single b/w "Don't You Know Why", but missed the charts.

=== Track listing ===
Side one
No.	Title	Writer(s)	Original UK release	Length
1.	"You Can't Lie To a Liar"	Frank Churchill, Lionel Hampton	Take Me for What I'm Worth	2:20
2.	"Goodbye My Love"	Robert Mosley, Lamar Simington, Leroy Swearingen	non-album single	2:58
3.	"Don't You Know Why"	John McNally	Take Me for What I'm Worth	2:36
4.	"Does She Really Care For Me"	Larry Weiss, Fred Anisfield	Take Me for What I'm Worth	2:04
5.	"So Far Away"	Chris Curtis, Mike Pender	non-album single, B-side He's Got No Love	1:59
6.	"I'll Be Doggone"	Smokey Robinson, Warren Moore, Marvin Tarplin	Take Me for What I'm Worth	2:52

Side two
No.	Title	Writer(s)	Original UK release	Length
1.	"Each Time"	Jackie DeShannon	Take Me for What I'm Worth	2:46
2.	"Till I Met You"	Chris Curtis, Mike Pender, John McNally, Frank Allen	non-album single, B-side Goodbye My Love	2:57
3.	"I'm Your Loving Man"	Chris Curtis, Mike Pender	Take Me for What I'm Worth	1:57
4.	"Be My Baby"	Jeff Barry, Ellie Greenwich, Phil Spector	Take Me for What I'm Worth	3:16
5.	"Four Strong Winds"	Ian Tyson	Take Me for What I'm Worth	3:06
6.	"He's Got No Love"	Mike Pender, Chris Curtis	non-album single	2:38

== The Second US version (Take Me for What I'm Worth) ==
Take Me for What I'm Worth (US)

Studio album by The Searchers
- Released: 1966
- Recorded: 1965
- Studios: Pye Studios, London
- Genre: Rock/Pop/Folk
- Label: Kapp
- Producer: Tony Hatch

The Searchers US chronology
The Searchers No. 4 (1965)	Take Me for What I'm Worth (US) (1966)	Needles & Pins (1972)

Singles from Take Me for What I'm Worth (US)
- 1. "He's Got No Love" Released: July 1965; 2. "You Can’t Lie To a Liar" Released: October 1965; 3. "Take Me for What I'm Worth" Released: December 1965

In February 1966 Kapp Records released LP again. This time under the UK title Take Me for What I'm Worth and with a similar cover art (with B/W photo of the band). Once again it was released with a different track listing included previous UK hit singles "He's Got No Love" and When I Get Home (written by Bobby Darin) and their B-sides. For some reasons, both US editions omitted the UK opening rock and roll stomper „I’m Ready“ (originally by Fats Domino), which was released as a single in some European countries as Germany or Sweden.

=== Track listing ===
Side one
No.	Title	Writer(s)	Original UK release	Length
1.	"Take Me For What I'm Worth"	P. F. Sloan	Take Me for What I'm Worth	2:40
2.	"I'm Never Coming Back"	Chris Curtis, Mike Pender	non-album single, B-side When I Get Home	1:58
3.	"Too Many Miles"	Chris Curtis, Mike Pender, John McNally, Frank Allen	Take Me for What I'm Worth	2:07
4.	"It's Time"	John McNally	Take Me for What I'm Worth	2:36
5.	"So Far Away"	Chris Curtis, Mike Pender	non-album single, B-side He's Got No Love	1:59
6.	"You Can't Lie To a Liar"	Frank Churchill, Lionel Hampton	Take Me for What I'm Worth	2:20

Side two
No.	Title	Writer(s)	Original UK release	Length
1.	"Don't You Know Why"	John McNally	Take Me for What I'm Worth	2:36
2.	"Each Time"	Jackie DeShannon	Take Me for What I'm Worth	2:46
3.	"He's Got No Love"	Chris Curtis, Mike Pender	non-album single	2:38
4.	"I'll Be Doggone"	Smokey Robinson, Warren Moore, Marvin Tarplin	Take Me for What I'm Worth	2:52
5.	"I'm Your Loving Man"	Chris Curtis, Mike Pender	Take Me for What I'm Worth	1:57
6.	"When I Get Home"	Bobby Darin, Russell Alquist	non-album single	2:09

== Personnel ==
The Searchers

- Mike Pender – lead guitar, lead vocals, backing vocals
- John McNally – rhythm guitar, lead and backing vocals
- Frank Allen – bass, lead and backing vocals
- Chris Curtis – drums, lead and backing vocals

Additional musicians and production

- Tony Hatch – producer, piano
- Ray Prickett – Recording engineer
