= The Searchers Play the System – Rarities, Oddities & Flipsides =

1987 compilation album by the Searchers

Compilation album by The Searchers
- Released: 1987
- Recorded: 1963–1967
- Genre: Rock/Pop
- Label: PRT
- Producer: Tony Hatch

The Searchers Play the System – Rarities, Oddities & Flipsides, commonly abbreviated to Play the System, is the compilation album featuring a selection of songs by English band the Searchers. The album was originally released as part of the Searchers collection on PRT Records, a set containing all original Searchers recordings released between 1963 and 1967 in the UK on Pye Records. It is also the only album gathering together mostly self-penned tunes by the Searchers.

== Overview ==
When all of the Searchers' UK sixties albums were being reissued in 1987 (on LPs, CDs and cassette tapes), PRT Records decided to make two-disc compilation album set originally released as two separate volumes. The set compiles every song released commercially by the band that was not available on their original UK albums. The hits featured on the album named Hits Collection. On the other hand, Play the System was conceived to include lesser-known songs, 18 tracks, including mainly B-sides of their singles, three non-LP A-sides, and the odd 1964 EP-only cut "The System", which was used in a 1964 film of the same name.

== Track listing ==
Side 1
No.	Title	Writer(s)	Originally released	Length
1.	"It's All Been a Dream"	Chris Curtis	B-side of "Sweets for My Sweet", 1963	1:48
2.	"Saturday Night Out"	Mark Anthony, Robert Richards	B-side of "Needles and Pins", 1964	1:43
3.	"I Pretend I'm with You"	Chris Curtis	B-side of "Don't Throw Your Love Away", 1964	1:57
4.	"No-One Else Could Love Me"	Chris Curtis	B-side of "Someday We're Gonna Love Again", 1964	2:12
5.	"I'll Be Missing You"	Chris Curtis, Mike Pender, John McNally, Frank Allen	B-side of "When You Walk in the Room", 1964	2:01
6.	"This Feeling Inside"	Chris Curtis, Mike Pender, John McNally, Frank Allen	B-side of "What Have They Done to the Rain", 1964	1:43
7.	"Till I Met You"	Chris Curtis, Mike Pender, John McNally, Frank Allen	B-side of "Goodbye My Love", 1965	2:56
8.	"So Far Away"	Chris Curtis, Mike Pender	B-side of "He's Got No Love", 1965	2:00
9.	"I'm Never Coming Back"	Chris Curtis, Mike Pender	B-side of "When I Get Home", 1965	1:59
10.	"Don't Hide It Away"	Mike Pender, John McNally, Frank Allen	B-side of "Take It or Leave It", 1966	2:40

Side 2
No.	Title	Writer(s)	Originally released	Length
13.	"It's Just the Way (Love Will Come and Go)"	John McNally, Mike Pender	B-side of "Have You Ever Loved Somebody", 1966	2:42
14.	"Popcorn Double Feature"	Larry Weiss, Scott English	A-side, 1967	2:02
15.	"Lovers"	John McNally, Mike Pender	B-side of "Popcorn Double Feature", 1967	2:54
16.	"Western Union"	Mike Rabon, John Durrill, Norman Ezell	A-side, 1967	3:32
17.	"I'll Cry Tomorrow"	John McNally, Mike Pender	B-side of "Western Union", 1967	2:59
18.	"Second Hand Dealer"	Frank Allen, Mike Pender	A-side, 1967	2:30
19.	"Crazy Dreams"	John McNally, Mike Pender	B-side of "Second Hand Dealer", 1967	2:29
20.	"The System"	Mike Pratt, Robert Richards	EP track, 1964	2:44

== Personnel ==
The Searchers

- Mike Pender – lead guitar, lead vocals, backing vocals (1–20)
- John McNally – rhythm guitar, lead and backing vocals (1–20)
- Tony Jackson – bass guitar, lead and backing vocals (1–4)
- Chris Curtis – drums, lead and backing vocals (1–9, 20)
- Frank Allen – bass guitar, lead and backing vocals (5–20)
- John Blunt – drums (10–19)

Additional musicians and production

- Tony Hatch – producer, piano (1–20)
