= Sounds Like Searchers =

Album by The Searchers

Studio album by The Searchers
- Released: 19 March 1965
- Recorded: 1965
- Studios: Pye Studios, London
- Genre: Rock/Pop
- Label: Pye
- Producer: Tony Hatch

The Searchers chronology
It's the Searchers (1964)	Sounds Like Searchers (1965)	Take Me for What I'm Worth (1965)

German alternative cover
- The Searchers (Vogue, 1965)

Sounds Like Searchers is the fourth studio album by the English rock band The Searchers and the group's first LP featuring singer and bass player Frank Allen. Album features title track of the band's UK No.1 EP "Bumble Bee" as well as cover versions of some well known tracks written or co-written by Burt Bacharach, John Barry or Jackie DeShannon. The album has reached the Top 10 in the UK album chart.

== Overview ==
The departure of singer Tony Jackson from the band did not threaten its popularity. The Searchers had another string of hits with new bassist and singer Frank Allen (chart-buster "When You Walk in the Room", folk protest song "What Have They Done to the Rain" and another smash "Goodbye My Love"), before they released another album. Although all band members tried to write their own compositions, just three of Chris Curtis songs made it to the album. “Frank (Allen) and I were writing, but there was never any real respect paid to our songs,” said John McNally about this period. Success gave them a little more control in the studio work (two years ago they recorded their first album in one day). Yet they were not satisfied. "We never had a real concept for our albums," said Frank Allen. "Plus we tended to record our songs very quickly… We certainly weren’t allowed the time to perfect our arrangements, or make them more elaborate, the way that groups like The Beatles did."

== Release ==
Sounds Like Searchers was released as a monaural (mono) LP album on the Pye label in the UK on March 19, 1965, Pye NPL 18111. It entered the LP charts on March 27, 1965 went to No. 8 and stayed for 17 weeks. An EP called "Four by Four" with songs taken from the album (with "Till You Say You'll Be Mine" as the lead track) was released on the Pye Records NEP 24228 in November 1965 but failed to chart.

In the Netherlands, "I Don't Want to Go On Without You" was issued as a single A-side and reached No. 17 (in the meantime "Bumble Bee" reached No. 23 on the Dutch Top 40). The Moody Blues also recorded and released hit version of the song at the same time. Another beat group from The Searchers hometown Liverpool, The Kubas, did a rendition of "Magic Potion" in 1965 but failed to chart.

== Track listing ==
Side 1
No.	Title	Writer(s)	Lead vocals	Length
1.	"Everybody Come And Clap Your Hands"	Ellie Greenwich, Jeff Barry	Frank Allen	2:38
2.	"If I Could Find Someone"	Chris Curtis	Mike Pender, Chris Curtis	2:08
3.	"Magic Potion"	Burt Bacharach, Hal David	Chris Curtis	2:31
4.	"I Don't Want to Go On Without You"	Bert Berns, Jerry Wexler	Mike Pender	2:57
5.	"Bumble Bee"	LaVern Baker, Leroy Fullylove	Mike Pender	2:12
6.	"Something You Got Baby"	Chris Kenner	Mike Pender	2:36

Side 2
No.	Title	Writer(s)	Lead vocals	Length
1.	"Let The Good Times Roll"	Shirley Goodman, Leonard Lee	Mike Pender, Frank Allen	1:41
2.	"A Tear Fell"	Eugene Randolph, Dorian Burton	Mike Pender	2:58
3.	"Till You Say You'll Be Mine"	Jackie DeShannon	Mike Pender	2:15
4.	"You Wanna Make Her Happy"	Chris Curtis	Mike Pender	2:10
5.	"Everything You Do"	Chris Curtis	John McNally	1:34
6.	"Goodnight Baby"	Ellie Greenwich, John Barry	Mike Pender	2:17

== US version (The New Searchers LP) ==
The New Searchers LP (Chris, John, Mike, Frank)

Studio album by The Searchers
- Released: February 1965
- Recorded: 1965
- Studios: Pye Studios, London
- Genre: Rock/Pop
- Label: Kapp
- Producer: Tony Hatch

The Searchers US chronology
The Searchers Meet the Rattles (1964)	The New Searchers LP (Chris, John, Mike, Frank) (1965)	The Searchers No. 4 (1965)

Singles from The New Searchers LP
- 1. "What Have They Done to the Rain" Released: January 1965; 2. "Bumble Bee" Released: March 1965

Album was released in the US on Kapp Records as "The New Searchers LP (Chris, John, Mike, Frank)" with a different cover but using similar track order (included actual hit single "What Have They Done to the Rain" instead of the song "Let The Good Times Roll"). The album entered Billboard Top 200 on March 20, 1965 went to No. 112 and stayed for 7 weeks. Album track "Bumble Bee" was released as the main single of the album in the US and went to No. 21 on the Billboard Hot 100.

=== Track listing ===
Side 1
No.	Title	Writer(s)	Original UK release	Length
1.	"Everybody Come And Clap Your Hands"	Ellie Greenwich, John Barry	Sounds Like Searchers	2:38
2.	"If I Could Find Someone"	Chris Curtis	Sounds Like Searchers	2:08
3.	"Magic Potion"	Burt Bacharach, Hal David	Sounds Like Searchers	2:31
4.	"I Don't Want to Go On Without You"	Bert Berns, Jerry Wexler	Sounds Like Searchers	2:57
5.	"Bumble Bee"	LaVern Baker, Leroy Fullylove	Sounds Like Searchers	2:12
6.	"Something You Got Baby"	Chris Kenner	Sounds Like Searchers	2:36

Side 2
No.	Title	Writer(s)	Original UK release	Length
1.	"What Have They Done to the Rain"	Malvina Reynolds	non-album single	2:34
2.	"A Tear Fell"	Eugene Randolph, Dorian Burton	Sounds Like Searchers	2:58
3.	"Till You Say You'll Be Mine"	Jackie DeShannon	Sounds Like Searchers	2:15
4.	"You Wanna Make Her Happy"	Chris Curtis	Sounds Like Searchers	2:10
5.	"Everything You Do"	Chris Curtis	Sounds Like Searchers	1:34
6.	"Goodnight Baby"	Ellie Greenwich, John Barry	Sounds Like Searchers	2:17

== Personnel ==
The Searchers

- Mike Pender – lead guitar, lead vocals, backing vocals
- John McNally – rhythm guitar, lead and backing vocals
- Frank Allen – bass, lead and backing vocals
- Chris Curtis – drums, lead and backing vocals

Additional musicians and production

- Tony Hatch – producer, piano
- Ray Prickett – recording engineer
