= The Cryan' Shames =

American garage rock band

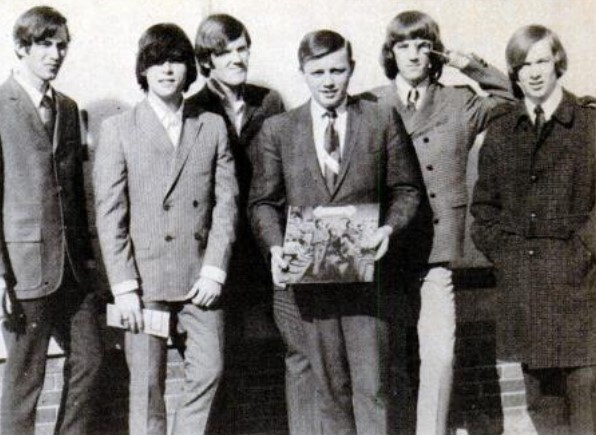

Background information
- Origin: Chicago, Illinois, United States
- Genres: Sunshine pop; psychedelic pop; pop rock
- Years active: 1966–present
- Labels: Columbia, Sundazed
- Past members: Tom Doody; Jim Pilster; Gerry Stone; Dave Purple; Denny Conroy; James Fairs; Lenny Kerley; Isaac Guillory; Dave Carter; Alan Dawson; Bob Stroud; Ron Kaplan; Ron Brandt; Larry Coveny; Tim Rutter; Ted Kalamatas; John Pavletic; Jeff Rutter; Paul Wood; Greg Brucker; Tommy Otto; Michael Ayres

The Cryan' Shames are an American garage rock band from Hinsdale, Illinois. Originally known as The Travelers, the band was formed by Tom Doody ("Toad"), Gerry Stone ("Stonehenge"), Dave Purple ("Grape") of The Prowlers, Denny Conroy from Possum River, and Jim Fairs from The Roosters, Jim Pilster ("J.C. Hooke", so named because he was born without a left hand and wore a hook), and Bill Hughes. The band's most successful song was their cover of The Searchers' "Sugar and Spice".

== History ==
In 1966, upon learning that another band was already using the name “Tommy and the Travelers”, they needed to find another name. J.C. Hooke was familiar with Tommy Krein of that band, and asked him if he would be interested in joining their band instead; when Krein (pronounced Cryan) declined, Hooke remarked that it was "a cryan' shame," thus naming the band. After the Cryan' Shames signed with Bob Monaco, the promotion manager for Destination Music, their first single was supposed to be George Harrison's song "If I Needed Someone"; however, due to publication issues, it was not released (although it was included on their debut album). Instead, their first single was "Sugar and Spice," a Tony Hatch song that had been a 1963 hit for the English group The Searchers. The Shames' version reached number 49 in the US and number four on Chicago radio (WLS). Another single was released just before the end of 1966 called "I Wanna Meet You" b/w "We Could Be Happy", both composed by Jim Fairs. This record made it to number one in Chicago and number 85 nationally.

The Shames signed to Columbia in 1966, and they focused on their first album release, which was heavily influenced by The Byrds. Their album, Sugar and Spice, was recorded in just two days, but it was strengthened by cover versions of contemporary popular songs like "We Gotta Get Out of This Place" and "Hey Joe". Upon its October 1966 release, the album became a hit in Chicago and charted at number 192 nationally. Dave Purple and Gerry Stone left following the first album release. They were replaced by Isaac Guillory and Lenny Kerley.

The Cryan' Shames in concert, 1966

Follow-up singles met with lesser success, but, in August 1967, "It Could Be We're in Love" was number one in Chicago on both WLS and WCFL. Before the development of their second album, Stone was drafted to fight in the Vietnam War and lineup changes followed. Their second album, an experimental combination of psychedelic rock and studio arrangements, charted at number 156. Their productions and vocal harmonies had improved, which was reflected positively in album sales. Jim Fairs and Dennis Conroy left following the release of the second album. They were replaced by Dave Carter and Alan Dawson.

The group's new lineup released their final album, Synthesis. The album marked attempts at progressive rock with jazz influences. The album charted lower than their previous effort and was considered a disappointment. The group disbanded in December 1969, but they later reunited and continue to tour. The Shames were never a national success, but their singles and albums sold well in the Chicago area. Jim "J.C. Hooke" Pilster and Tom Doody (Toad) are the only remaining original members in the current lineup. Two members of The Cryan' Shames have died: bassist Dave Purple in June 2001, and his replacement, Isaac Guillory, on December 31, 2000.

In 2023, the Illinois Rock and Roll Museum in Joliet, Illinois, inducted the Cryan’ Shames into its Hall of Fame. J.C. Hooke Pilster accepted the award while performing classic hits like “Sugar and Spice” among others.

== Discography ==
=== Singles ===
Year	Titles (A-side, B-side) Both sides from same album except where indicated (R): Tracks remixed for album inclusion	Label & number	Chart positions			Album
Year	Titles (A-side, B-side) Both sides from same album except where indicated (R): Tracks remixed for album inclusion	Label & number	Billboard	Cashbox	RPM	Album
1966	"Sugar and Spice"; B-side: "Ben Franklin's Almanac"	Destination 624	49	52	49	Sugar & Spice
1966	"I Wanna Meet You"; B-side: "We Could Be Happy"	Columbia 43836	85	65	50	Sugar & Spice
1967	"Mr. Unreliable" (R); B-side: "Georgia" (Non-album track)	Columbia 44037	127	-	-	A Scratch in the Sky
1967	"It Could Be We're in Love" (R); B-side: "I Was Lonely When" (R)	Columbia 44191	85	70	-	A Scratch in the Sky
1968	"Up on the Roof" (R); B-side: "The Sailing Ship" (R)	Columbia 44457	85	70	-	A Scratch in the Sky
1968	"Young Birds Fly"; B-side: "Sunshine Psalm" (R -- from A Scratch in the Sky)	Columbia 44545	99	86	77	Non-album track
1968	"Greenburg, Glickstein, Charles, David Smith & Jones" (R); B-side: "The Warm" (Non-album track)	Columbia 44638	115	73	82	Synthesis
1969	"First Train to California" (R); B-side: "A Master's Fool" (R)	Columbia 44759	-	-	-	Synthesis
1969	"Rainmaker"; B-side: "Bits and Pieces"	Columbia 45027	-	-	-	Non-album tracks

=== Albums ===
Year	Title	Label & number	US chart positions
1966	Sugar and Spice	Columbia CL 2589 (Mono) / CS 9389 (Stereo)	BB No. 192
1967	A Scratch in the Sky	Columbia CL 2786 / CS 9586	BB No. 156 / CB No. 78
1968	Synthesis	Columbia CS 9719	BB No. 184 / CB No. 83
BB = Billboard; CB = Cash Box
