= Everything Nice =

Everything Nice may refer to:

- "Sugar and spice and everything nice", a line from the nursery rhyme "What Are Little Boys Made Of?"
- And Everything Nice, an American fashion TV show
- "Everything Nice", a 2017 song by DreamDoll (musician)
- Everything Nice (The Inside episode)
- Everything Nice (EP), by Canadian emo band Arm's Length

== See also ==
- Sugar and Spice (disambiguation)
