= Play for Today (album) =

1981 album by The Searchers

Studio album by The Searchers
- Released: April 1981
- Recorded: August – October 1980
- Studios: Rockfield Studios, Wales, UK
- Genre: Rock/pop
- Label: Sire
- Producers: Pat Moran, Ed Stasium

The Searchers chronology
Searchers (1979)	Play for Today (1981)	Hungry Hearts (1988)

Singles from Searchers
- 1. "Another Night" Released: 1981

Play for Today is the eighth studio album by English rock band The Searchers and the last band's album to feature lead singer Mike Pender. LP was released both in the UK and the US with completely different cover art and slightly divergent track listing. Album contained songs originally performed by John Fogerty ("Almost Saturday Night"), Big Star ("September Gurls") or Fats Domino ("Sick and Tired"). Session musicians on the album included Martin Hughes on drums and keyboard player Mick Weaver.

== Overview and recording ==
Despite previous album, Searchers, was a flop in the UK, it was a moderate commercial success in the US and that opened door for a follow-up on the Sire Records. The general feeling in the company was that, there was a need for an extra depth and edge to any new product, and the American producer Ed Stasium was brought in to add the missing elements. Mike Pender sings lead on all tracks, drummer Billy Adamson was replaced for the sessions by Irish drummer Martin Hughes. Keyboard player Mick Weaver, who worked as a session musician for Frankie Miller, David Gilmour or John Lodge, was also on the board. The title, Play for Today, was a play on words, having been lifted from the popular BBC drama series of the same name. It was a phrase that would serve to strike a chord of identification with listeners in Britain.

== Release and reception ==
The album was released in April 1981 in a simple black cover featured a radio tuner drawn in contrasting green lines (made by Sara Batho). One of the album's catchy rock tunes, the group-written "Another Night", was released as a lead single. Despite positive reviews and the fact that band's jangly-pop sound was tailor-made for the eighties new wave, both album and single missed the charts. Play for Today became the last album to be released by the Searchers in the UK (in fact, Hungry Hearts on the German Coconut Records was the last album recorded by the band).

== Track listing ==
Side 1
No.	Title	Writer(s)	Length
1.	"Another Night"	Mike Pender, John McNally, Frank Allen	3:05
2.	"September Gurls"	Alex Chilton	2:55
3.	"Murder in My Heart"	Ronnie Thomas	2:54
4.	"She Made a Fool of You"	Moon Martin	3:21
5.	"Silver"	Dave Paul	3:20
6.	"Sick and Tired"	Chris Kenner	3:03

Side 2
No.	Title	Writer(s)	Length
7.	"Radio Romance"	Paul Shuttleworth, Vic Collins, Will Birch	3:41
8.	"Infatuation"	Randy Bishop	2:40
9.	"Almost Saturday Night"	John Fogerty	2:46
10.	"Everything But a Heartbeat"	Richie Bull, Will Birch	4:02
11.	"Little Bit of Heaven"	Mike Pender, John McNally, Frank Allen	3:23
12.	"New Day"	John David	2:39

== US version (Love's Melodies) ==
Love's Melodies

Studio album by The Searchers
- Released: March 1981
- Recorded: August – October 1980
- Studios: Rockfield Studios, Wales, UK
- Genre: Rock/pop
- Label: Sire
- Producers: Pat Moran, Ed Stasium

The Searchers chronology
Searchers (1979)	Love's Melodies (1981)

Singles from Searchers
- 1. "Love's Melody" Released: 1981

Nobody in America knew what the "Play for Today" meant to be, so Sire decided to rename the record for the US (and international) market. It was named Love's Melodies after the title song and the main US single ("Love's Melody" was not included on the UK version), although the Searchers' were not satisfied with the change. "It conversely gave a false impression of the content," says Frank Allen in his autobiography. "It was a hard driving rock album and not a collection of soppy love songs." The album was released with new packaging, designed by famous John Van Hamersveld (the artist behind the covers of Magical Mystery Tour by the Beatles, Crown of Creation by Jefferson Airplane and Exile on Main Street by the Rolling Stones). Unfortunately the record missed the charts even in the US. "Sire Records and Seymour Stein had put their faith in the band," says Mike Pender. "But the lack of any kind of backup and fading compatibility within the band, all our hard work had come to nothing." Love’s Melodies became the final Searchers' record to be released in the U.S.

=== Track listing ===
Side 1
No.	Title	Writer(s)	Length
1.	"Silver"	Dave Paul	3:20
2.	"Infatuation"	Randy Bishop	2:40
3.	"She Made a Fool of You"	Moon Martin	3:21
4.	"Almost Saturday Night"	John Fogerty	2:46
5.	"Little Bit of Heaven"	Mike Pender, John McNally, Frank Allen	3:23
6.	"New Day (titled as "You Are The New Day")"	John David	2:39

Side 2
No.	Title	Writer(s)	Length
7.	"Love's Melody"	Andrew McMaster	3:27
8.	"Everything But a Heartbeat"	Richie Bull, Will Birch	4:02
9.	"Radio Romance"	Ronnie Thomas	2:54
10.	"Murder in My Heart"	Richie Bull, Will Birch	4:02
11.	"September Gurls"	Alex Chilton	2:55
12.	"Another Night"	Mike Pender, John McNally, Frank Allen	3:05

== Personnel ==
The Searchers

- Mike Pender – lead vocals, rhythm guitar
- John McNally – lead guitar, vocals
- Frank Allen – bass, vocals
- Billy Adamson – drums (note: according to Pender's and Allen's autobiographies, Martin Hughes did all of the drumming)

Additional musicians and production

- Martin Hughes – Drums, Percussion
- Dave Charles – Percussion
- Mick Weaver – keyboards
- Pat Moran – Producer, Recording engineer
- Ed Stasium – Producer, Keyboards
- Paul McNally – Executive Producer
