= Sugar and Spice =

Sugar and spice, 'sugar 'n' spice, and sugar & spice may refer to:

== Books ==
- "Sugar and spice and everything nice", a line from the nursery rhyme "What Are Little Boys Made Of?"
- Sugar and Spice, a 2010 novel by Lauren Conrad
- Sugar and Spice, play by Nigel Williams

== Film and TV ==
- Sugar & Spice, a 2001 American film
- Sugar and Spice (2006 film), a Japanese film
- Sugar and Spice (Australian TV series), an Australian children's television series that ran from 1988 to 1989
- "Sugar & Spice" (Picket Fences), which generated controversy because it included a lesbian kiss
- Sugar and Spice (UK TV series), a show with Philip Morrow
- Sugar and Spice (American TV series), a 1990 American sitcom

== Music ==
- Sugar 'n' Spice, Spice (Canadian band)

=== Albums ===
- Sugar 'n' Spice (Martha Reeves and the Vandellas album), 1967
- Sugar & Spice (Mya album), 2006
- Sugar 'n' Spice (Peggy Lee album), 1962
- Sugar and Spice (The Cryan' Shames album), 1966
- Sugar and Spice (The Searchers album), 1963

=== Songs ===
- "Sugar and Spice" (Madness song), a 2009 song by Madness
- "Sugar and Spice" (The Searchers song), a 1963 song by The Searchers, and covered in 1966 by The Cryan' Shames
- "Sugar and Spice", a 1969 song by The Archies from Jingle Jangle album
- "Sugar & Spice", a 2013 single by Icon for Hire
- "Sugar n Spice", a song by Yemi Alade from Mama Africa

== Other uses ==
- Sugar and Spice, a New Zealand comic duo in the 1990s, with Jonathan Brugh and Jason Hoyte
- Sugar and Spice (drag queens), American twins and drag performers
- Sugar and spice, an example of a linguistic irreversible binomial
