= Play for Today (disambiguation) =

Play for Today is a British television anthology drama series broadcast from 1970 to 1984.

Play for Today (Channel 5 series) is a 2025 revival of the BBC series.

Play for Today may also refer to:

- Play for Today (album), an album by The Searchers
- Play for Today, an album by Ultrasound
- "Play for Today", a song by The Cure, from the album Seventeen Seconds
- "Play for Today", a song by Belle and Sebastian, from the album Girls in Peacetime Want to Dance
