= Spencer James =

English musician (born 1953)

- James performing in 2009

Background information
- Born: Spencer Frederick James; 15 April 1953 (age 73); Hayes, Middlesex, England
- Genres: Pop, rock and roll, beat
- Instruments: Vocals, synthesizer guitar, guitar
- Years active: 1970–present
- Website: www.spencerjames.biz

Spencer Frederick James (born 15 April 1953) is an English singer and musician. He was the lead singer of veteran pop band The Searchers from 1986 until 2025, when the band retired. James was also a member of the one-hit wonder band The First Class that scored a No. 4 hit with the song "Beach Baby".

== Early life ==
James grew up in Hayes, Middlesex. Working for Marshall's Music Group, he developed an interest in guitars and began playing and singing in local bands. James improved his stage craft while deputising in the band White Plains. He then moved on to form a band named Duke.

== Career ==
=== The First Class ===
The First Class was initially a studio creation featuring the voice of Tony Burrows. The success of the song "Beach Baby" (#4 in the US) led to demand for live appearances. A group, including Spencer James, was assembled to perform a number of dates as The First Class.

In 1983, The First Class recorded the single "Gimme Little Sign" with Spencer James on vocals. The single had some success in the Netherlands.

=== Nightfly ===
Formed in 1985 (originally under the name Heyday), Nightfly was a supergroup consisting of Spencer James on lead vocals, Zak Starkey on drums, Boz Burrell (ex-Bad Company) on bass, Micky Moody (ex-Whitesnake) on guitar and Mickey Simmonds on keyboards. Nightfly toured in early 1985 but broke up soon after.

James went on to form the Spencer James Band which enjoyed considerable success around the pub circuit of West London. At one gig at Brentford's Red Lion they shared the bill with The Searchers.

=== The Searchers ===
In December 1985 long-time lead singer of The Searchers, Mike Pender, announced that he was leaving the group. Founding member John McNally recalled Spencer James from the Brentford gig and he was recruited as the new lead singer. His mastery of the synthesizer guitar also added authentic strings and keyboard sounds to The Searchers stage performances, emulating their original studio recordings.

For more than twenty years, James has completed extensive national and international tours with The Searchers. He has also contributed to the album Hungry Hearts and a number of live recordings of the band (see Discography).

== Discography ==
=== With The First Class ===
==== Studio albums ====
Title	Year
The First Class	1974
The First Class	1976

==== Singles ====
Year	Single
1974	"Beach Baby"
1974	"Bobby Dazzler"
1974	"Dreams are Ten a Penny"
1975	"What Became of Me"
1975	"Funny How Love Can Be"
1975	"Life Is Whatever You Want It To Be"
1975	"I Was a Star"
1976	"Beach Baby (Re-Release)"
1976	"Child's Play"
1976	"Ain't No Love"
1977	"Too Many Golden Oldies"
1978	"Broken Toy"
1980	"Beach Baby (Re-Release)"
1982	"Beach Baby (Re-Release)"
1983	"Gimme Little Sign"

=== Solo ===
Despite his hectic schedule with The Searchers, James has found time to record a number of solo albums in his home studio (SJO Music), many of the songs written himself. He also records and produces other acts.

- Days Gone By (1987)
- Tides of Time
- Love Remains
- Breathe In, Breathe Out (2004)
- The Age of Reason (2011)
- Hope For Me Yet (2012)
- Chapter & Verse (2016)
- Time For Letting Go (2018)

=== With The Searchers ===
==== Albums ====
Album details	Year	Note
Hungry Hearts	1988	
Searchers Live	1998	
Searchers Live 2	2000	
Searchers Live 3	2003	
On Stage	2005	
The Definitive Searchers Live in Concert	2008	

== Videography ==
- "Beach Baby", The First Class, TV appearance on YouTube
- "Needles and Pins", The Searchers, video clip, 1988 on YouTube
- "Needles and Pins", The Searchers, TV appearance, 1992 on YouTube
- "Searchers Medley", The Searchers, live performance, 2007 on YouTube
