= Isaac Guillory =

American musician

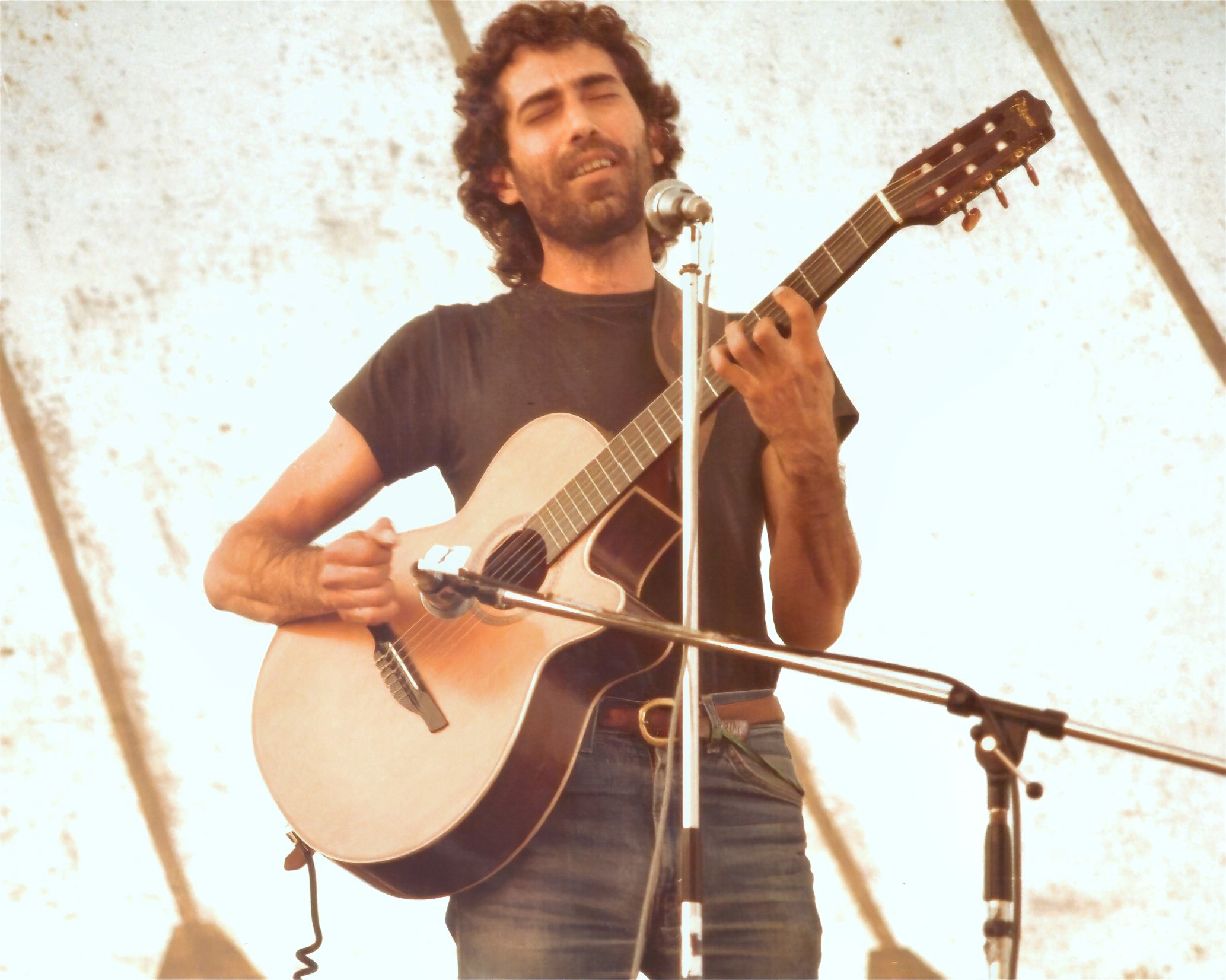
- Guillory performing in July 1985

Background information
- Born: February 27, 1947; US Naval Base, Guantanamo Bay, Cuba
- Died: December 31, 2000 (aged 53)
- Genres: Folk
- Occupation: Musician
- Instrument: Guitar
- Labels: Atlantic Records, Personal Records, Graffiti
- Website: Isaacguillory.com

Isaac Guillory (February 27, 1947 – December 31, 2000) was an American folk guitarist.

== Career ==
Guillory's first band was The Continentals in Gainesville, Florida in 1960 at age 13. This band, which later changed its name to Maundy Quintet, included Don Felder and Stephen Stills, and later Bernie Leadon, who was an original member of the Eagles.

In 1961, he moved with his family 45 miles east to Palatka, Florida for his dad's work. Guillory's first performances began in 1962 playing lead guitar in the Fallouts while attending high school in Palatka. In 1964 he became a founding member of The Illusions as lead guitarist and vocalist.

Towards the end of 1965, Guillory moved to Chicago where he studied at the Chicago School of Music and Roosevelt University. He recorded two albums there in the late 1960s with The Cryan' Shames, having joined them in 1967 as bass player.

He then attended Wright Junior College for three years where he played with The Revelles. The group played with Chicago DJ, Art Roberts, of WLS. He then played with The Cryan' Shames.

During 1970 to 1976, Guillory performed at the Shakespeare's Head Folk Club in Carnaby Street, London, England.

After active resistance to the Vietnam War, Guillory left the US in November 1970, acquired a Martin D-35 and lived throughout Europe. He worked as an acoustic solo performer and settled in the United Kingdom. Guillory developed 'hybrid picking', where he would sustain a bass line with a plectrum held between his thumb and first finger, whilst picking chord and melody lines with his second and third fingers.

Having studied classical guitar in his younger years, Guillory incorporated quasi-classical techniques into his playing and on occasions would even throw in some pure classical guitar pieces, merging them into various songs as a medley.

He was widely known for insisting on carrying his own PA sound system with him from gig to gig. This allowed him to reproduce the exact sound he wanted night after night regardless of the venue. This was quite rare at the time with solo singer/guitarists on the folk circuit and certainly helped him to communicate his renowned performing skills to his audiences without having to fear the usual technical blips that can occur using a venue's house PA.

He always concentrated on live solo performances (which put him up-close with more intimate small audiences) and sharing his understanding of music; touring, creating his own online guitar school. After an initial recording deal with Atlantic Records published five more CDs on his own independent label, Personal Records. As a performer he was dedicated to sharing his gift with both audience and fellow musicians, and as a teacher he never hesitated to share in a manner that others could understand.

He performed frequently as a guest artist for recordings and films with, among many others, Al Stewart, Donovan, Mick Jagger, Elkie Brooks, Michael Marra, Peter Sarstedt, Buggles, Barbara Dickson, and Nick Heyward. Guillory released Isaac Guillory, a self-titled album in 1974. For a while he delved into jazz fusion and recorded with Pacific Eardrum. Guillory lectured at the Guildhall School of Music in London. His music can be heard on 'A' Net Station, a web radio station that he helped found, where his website continues to be available.

He also wrote The Guitar Hand Book with friend, Ralph Denyer, which became the foundation for the BBC series Rockschool.

In his later years, he performed on the folk club circuit in Great Britain. His guitar playing made him popular with audiences and ensured a steady stream of work as a performer and teacher. His final album, The Days of '49, recorded on tour during late 1999 and released in early 2000, included a number of solo compositions as well as arrangements of some folk standards. His tribute to the British guitarist John Renbourn, "Dear John", is one of the highlights of his album.

== Personal life ==
Guillory was born at the Guantanamo Bay Naval Base, Cuba. His father, Easton Joseph Guillory (1918-1965), was an American sailor (a U.S. Navy chief damage controlman) who later studied industrial and mechanical engineering at the University of Florida and worked as an industrial engineer for the Hudson Pulp and Paper Corporation at Palatka, Florida; his mother, Victoria (died 2011), daughter of Vitali Ojalvo, was a professional musician and later a Spanish/ English federal court interpreter. He had a sister, Claire. His maternal grandparents were Jewish emigrants from Turkey, who met and married by arrangement only 10 days before they sailed for Cuba. His family was Jewish.

He attended the Conservatory of Music, Havana, where he studied classical piano at the age of six. Guillory's mother, a professional musician, taught him to play guitar. When he was 11, Guillory moved to Tallahassee, Florida. At age 14, he moved again to Gainesville, then finally settled in Palatka, Florida for his father's work.

By age 14, after enrolling in University of Florida's swimming program, he became an assistant swimming instructor. He was a student at St. Johns River State College, at the time named St. Johns River Junior College, in Palatka. There, he studied the cello and saxophone.

He married twice, first to the English model Tina Thompson (divorced 1990), mother of Jace and British actress and model Sienna Guillory, then in 1993, to Victoria McMillan, mother of Easton and Ellerose.

Guillory died on New Year's Eve 2000. His death was attributed to complications from cancer that had gone undetected for some time.

== Album Isaac Guillory ==
Isaac Guillory was produced by Ian Samwell, Jeff Dexter, Jim Fairs, and was released in 1974 by Atlantic Records SD 7307, 1974.

Isaac Guillory: Guitars, Bass, Mellotron, ARP, Vocals
Jim Fairs: Guitar, Dulcimer
Peter Gavin: Drums (1)
Jim Carey: Drums (2, 8, 10)
Roger Pope: Drums (5)
Fred Gandy: Bass (1, 5, 7)
Jim Cole: Bass (8, 10)
Sam Gopal: Tablas (7, 8, 9)
Cathy Hall: Flute
Johnse Holt: Electric Guitar (8)
Mox: Harp

Side one
1. "St. Peter" (Guillory)
2. "Staying Awhile" (Klemens)
3. "Brusselles" (Guillory)
4. "Steamboat" (Guillory)
5. "Sidewalks of America" (Boyan)

Side two
6. "The Carbondale Strutt" (Guillory)
7. "Movin' On" (Guillory)
8. "Ice Cream Phoenix" (Kaukonen/Cockey)
9. "El Jadida" (Guillory)
10. "Karma Blues" (Carey)

== Discography ==
Guillory created and contributed to a number of albums, including:

- A Scratch In The Sky – 1967
- Synthesis – 1968
- Al Stewart, Past, Present and Future – 1973
- Isaac Guillory Side One (The Atlantic Years 1977) – 1973
- Isaac Guillory – 1974 (as detailed above)
- Two Days Away – 1977
- Jean-Patrick Capdevielle, /2 – 1980
- Michel Marra, The Midas Touch – 1980
- Fred Piek – 1981
- Cabrel Public – 1984, 1986
- Live – 1986
- Nick Heyward – Postcards From Home – 1986
- Quelqu'Un De L'Intérieur – 1987
- Easy – 1988
- Live – 1988
- Solo – 1990
- Slow Down – 1992
- The Days of Forty Nine – 2000
