= Scott Ottaway =

English drummer (born 1972)

- Born: 13 May 1972 (age 54)
- Genres: Pop, rock
- Occupation: Musician
- Instruments: Drums, percussion
- Years active: 1988–present
- Formerly of: The Searchers
- Website: scottottaway.com the-searchers.co.uk

Scott Ottaway (born 13 May 1972) is an English drummer.

== Career ==
He was the drummer for veteran Merseybeat band The Searchers, replacing Eddie Rothe in February 2010, until the band retired in 2019.

Ottaway is also the drummer for The Pocket Gods, an indie band from St Albans. Their last album 100x30 is in the Guinness Book of Records for the most songs on an album. All 100 songs are 30 seconds in length.
