= A Scratch in the Sky =

Studio album by The Cryan' Shames
- Released: December 6, 1967
- Genre: Pop rock
- Label: Columbia
- Producer: Bob Monaco

The Cryan' Shames chronology
Sugar and Spice (1966)	A Scratch in the Sky (1967)	Synthesis (1968)

A Scratch in the Sky (1967) is the second album by The Cryan' Shames. For this album, new members Isaac Guillory and Lenny Kerley join the lineup. Dave Purple and Jerry Stone are no longer listed on the credits. All but two songs are original compositions by Jim Fairs and Lenny Kerley.

== Reception ==
Professional ratings
Review scores
Source	Rating
Allmusic	3/5 stars

Richie Unterberger's retrospective review for Allmusic assessed that the album was heavily inspired by The Beach Boys and The Association but was not nearly as good nor as well-suited for radio as the works of those bands, though above average for the genre.

== Chart performance ==
The album debuted on Billboard magazine's Top LP's chart in the issue dated January 13, 1968, peaking at No. 156 during a five-week run on the chart. The album debuted on Cashbox magazine's Top 100 Albums chart in the issue dated January 20, 1968, peaking at No. 78 during a five-week run on the chart.

== Track listing ==
All tracks composed and arranged by Jim Fairs and Lenny Kerley, except where indicated.

Side 1

1. "A Carol for Lorelei" – 4:05
2. "The Sailing Ship" – 3:36
3. "In The Cafe" – 3:12
4. "Mr. Unreliable" – 2:52
5. "The Town I'd Like To Go Back To" – 4:30

Side 2

6. "Up on the Roof" (Gerry Goffin, Carole King) – 3:23
7. "It Could Be We're in Love" – 2:35
8. "Sunshine Psalm" – 2:17
9. "I Was Lonely When" – 4:03
10. "Cobblestone Road (She's Been Walkin')" – 2:51
11. "Dennis Dupree from Danville" (Jeffrey Boyan, Ron Holden) – 3:12

== Personnel ==
The Cryan' Shames

- Tom "Toad" Doody – lead vocals, autoharp, bells
- Jim Fairs – guitar, backing vocals, bass, mandolin, flute, bagpipes
- Lenny Kerley – guitar, backing vocals, bass, tamboura
- Isaac Guillory – bass, backing vocals, guitar, keyboards, accordion, cello
- Jim "J C Hooke" Pilster – tambourine, backing vocals, cowbell, backwards cowbell, French horn
- Dennis Conroy – drums, percussion

== Charts ==
Chart (1968)	Peak position
US Billboard Top LPs	156
US Cashbox Top 100 Albums	78
