= Sugar and Spice (The Cryan' Shames album) =

Studio album by The Cryan' Shames
- Released: October 17, 1966
- Recorded: August 25–26, 1966
- Genre: Garage rock
- Label: Columbia
- Producer: MG Production

The Cryan' Shames chronology
Sugar and Spice (1966)	A Scratch in the Sky (1967)

Sugar and Spice is the 1966 debut album by The Cryan' Shames, originally released in mono (CL 2589) and in stereo (CS 9389). The cover photography was done by Don Bronstein. The album was recorded in two days (August 25 and 26, 1966). The liner photography was done by Rich Dienethal of River Grove, Illinois. The cover photograph was taken at The Sweet Tooth in Pipers Alley, Old Town, Chicago. The album is dedicated to Fred Bohlander. The back of the album contains six photos of the band in concert. Apart from four songs written by The Cryan' Shames' lead guitarist Jim Fairs, the album consists entirely of cover songs.

== Chart performance ==
The album debuted on Billboard magazine's Top LP's chart in the issue dated May 13, 1967, peaking at No. 192 during a four-week run on the chart.

== Reception ==
Professional ratings
Review scores
Source	Rating
Allmusic	4/5 stars

In a retrospective review for Allmusic, Richie Unterberger remarked that Sugar and Spice was typical of the more slipshod rock albums of the era in that it simply compiled the tracks from the band's first two singles and filled out the rest of the running time with unimaginative cover versions of contemporary hit songs. While he was complimentary towards the four songs from the singles, assessing the originals as all respectable though unexceptional and the cover of "Sugar and Spice" as "more memorable and imaginative than the original", he noted that all four of them and "July" (the only original song not taken from a single) had since been included on the Sugar and Spice compilation from Legacy, which he felt made the original album superfluous.

== Track listing ==
Side 1

1. "Sugar and Spice" (Fred Nightingale) - 2:26
2. "We Could Be Happy" (Jim Fairs) - 2:32
3. "Heat Wave" (George James Webb, George Duffield, Jr./Holland-Dozier-Holland) - 2:07
4. "We'll Meet Again" (Ross Parker, Hughie Charles) - 2:07
5. "Ben Franklin's Almanac" (Fairs) - 1:56
6. "She Don't Care About Time" (Gene Clark) - 2:56

Side 2

7. "Hey Joe (Where You Gonna Go)" (Chet Powers) - 2:39
8. "If I Needed Someone" (George Harrison) - 2:19
9. "July" (Fairs) - 1:33
10. "I Want To Meet You" (Fairs) - 2:03
11. "We Gotta Get out of This Place" (Barry Mann, Cynthia Weil) - 3:40

== Personnel ==
The Cryan' Shames

- Tom Doody – vocals
- Jim Pilster – tambourine
- Dennis Conroy – drums
- Gerry Stone – rhythm guitar
- Jim Fairs – lead guitar
- Dave Purple – bass, organ, harpsichord
