= I Don't Want to Go On Without You =

"I Don't Want To Go On Without You"

Single by The Drifters
- Released: June 1964
- Genre: Soul, pop
- Label: Atlantic; 2237
- Songwriters: Bert Berns, Jerry Wexler
- Producer: Bert Berns

"I Don't Want to Go On Without You" is a soul ballad written by Bert Berns and Jerry Wexler and produced by Bert Berns for the Drifters in 1964.

== History ==
Originally intended to be the A-side to "Under the Boardwalk", the song was recorded in May 1964 under the direction of songwriter and producer Bert Berns. The night before the session, the Drifters' lead singer, Rudy Lewis, died of a heroin overdose. Longtime Drifters tenor Charlie Thomas took over the vocal.

== Covers ==
"I Don't Want to Go On Without You" has been covered by Nazareth, the Escorts (1965), the Moody Blues, Patti LaBelle and the Bluebelles, and Van Morrison. Dusty Springfield also performed the song on her television series Dusty. The performance was included on the Dusty Springfield DVD release Live at the BBC. British pop group the Searchers, recorded a version for their fourth studio album Sounds Like Searchers in 1965. Their version, which features a string section that "eschews the band format", was released as a single in the Netherlands where it reached number 17 on the Dutch Top 40 and number 18 on the Dutch Single Top 100.
