= Synthesis (The Cryan' Shames album) =

Studio album by the Cryan' Shames
- Released: 1968
- Genre: Sunshine Pop
- Label: Columbia
- Producer: Jim Golden

The Cryan' Shames chronology
A Scratch in the Sky (1967)	Synthesis (1968)

Synthesis is the third album by the Cryan' Shames and was released in 1968. It contains some lineup changes from their second album, A Scratch in the Sky. Drummer Dennis Conroy was replaced by Alan Dawson, and Jim Fairs moved on with Dave Carter on guitar.

== Chart performance ==
The album debuted on Billboard magazine's Top LP's chart in the issue dated February 15, 1969, peaking at No. 184 during a nine-week run on the chart. It debuted on Cashbox magazine's Top 100 Albums chart in the issue dated February 8, 1969, peaking at No. 83 during a six-week run on the chart.

== Critical reception ==
Professional ratings
Review scores
Source	Rating
Allmusic	2.5/5 stars

In a retrospective review for Allmusic, Richie Unterberger said that the Cryan' Shames were "among the most versatile mainstream pop/rock groups of the late '60s. Versatile does not mean great, though, or especially interesting, and can also mean an absence of a solid identity." He found that while the album exhibited some strengths in the arrangements and vocal harmonies, its eclectic mix of styles makes the band come off like pop musicians toying with psychedelic and progressive elements in an attempt to seem more hip.

== Track listing ==
Side 1

1. "Greenburg, Glickstein, Charles, David Smith and Jones" (Isaac Guillory) - 2:17
2. "Baltimore Oriole" (Hoagy Carmichael, Paul Francis Webster) - 4:31
3. "It's All Right" (D.P. "Dad" Carter) - 2:11
4. "Your Love" (Lenny Kerley) - 3:29
5. "A Master's Fool" (Guillory) - 3:40

Side 2

6. "First Train to California" (Jim Fairs) - 2:57
7. "The Painter" (Guillory) - 2:52
8. "Sweet Girl of Mine" (Kerley) - 2:26
9. "20th Song" (Kerley) - 2:08
10. "Let's Get Together" (Dino Valente) - 3:28
11. "Symphony of the Wind" (Guillory) - 3:25

== Personnel ==
- Tom Doody – vocals
- Jim Pilster – vocals, percussion
- Alan Dawson – vocals, drums
- Dave Carter – vocals, guitar
- Isaac Guillory – vocals, guitar, bass, keyboards
- Lenny Kerley – vocals, guitar, bass

== Release ==
The 2002 Sundazed remastered CD reissue adds eight bonus tracks. According to Allmusic, "Six of them are single versions of tracks from the LP; the other two present both sides of their 1969 single, 'Bits and Pieces'/'Rainmaker', which matched a country-rock original with a Harry Nilsson cover." There is a hidden bonus track at the end of "Rainmaker", which appears to be a radio spot for the album.

== Charts ==
Chart (1969)	Peak position
US Billboard Top LPs	184
US Cashbox Top 100 Albums	83
