= Mike Pender's Searchers =

British musical group

- Also known as: Mike Pender of The Searchers
- Origin: Liverpool, England
- Genres: Merseybeat; pop; rock; British rock and roll
- Years active: 1985–present
- Members: Mike Pender; Barrie Cowell; Keith Roberts; Mike Pender Jnr.
- Past members: Chris Black; Steve Carlisle; Paul Jackson; Kevin Healey
- Website: mikependersearchers.co.uk

Mike Pender's Searchers contains lead singer and guitarist Mike Pender, formerly of The Searchers. Pender left The Searchers in December 1985 hoping to explore new musical directions while preserving the classic 12-string guitar style that he helped to popularise. Mike Pender's Searchers showcase the classic hits from Pender's many years with The Searchers in addition to his all-new material and a blend of popular rock standards by classic artists such as Buddy Holly, The Drifters and Roy Orbison.

== History ==
Mike Pender founded The Searchers as a skiffle group in Liverpool in 1959 with John McNally. The band took their name from the classic 1956 John Ford western The Searchers. Pender claims that the name was his idea, but McNally ascribes it to 'Big Ron' Woodbridge (born Ronald Woodbridge, 1938, in Liverpool, Lancashire), their first lead singer. The genesis remains unresolved.

The Searchers rose to fame during the 1960s British Invasion movement, developing a large following around the world. Although The Searchers continued to tour and record new material, the group was never able to achieve the same level of success they found during the 1960s. Mike Pender left The Searchers in December 1985 to pursue a career of his own, marking a new beginning. During the 1980s, Mike Pender also joined an all-star rock band known as The Corporation AKA The Traveling Wrinklies, whose name was a parody of the popular rock group Traveling Wilburys with Roy Orbison, Tom Petty, Jeff Lynne, Bob Dylan and George Harrison. The Traveling Wrinklies contained Mike Pender of The Searchers, Brian Poole of Brian Poole & The Tremeloes, Clem Curtis of The Foundations, Tony Crane of The Merseybeats/ The Merseys and Reg Presley, lead singer of The Troggs. They released a 45 on the Corporation label: KORP 1, an updated version of The Showstoppers "Ain't Nothing But A House Party".

With The Searchers continuing to perform under the name, John McNally and Frank Allen replaced Mike Pender with a new vocalist named Spencer James, former lead singer of the group The First Class, who are best known for their hit single "Beach Baby".

Selecting a group of talented musicians, Mike Pender sought to re–create the unique sound that popularised The Searchers. Forming the band Mike Pender's Searchers, they began touring in the late 1980s. Between 1992 and 1995, Tony Jackson performed four times with Mike Pender's Searchers.

Mike Pender's Searchers re-recorded some of The Searchers hits and added five new tracks and released one CD, these tracks have however been re-licensed and released time and time again under different titles in various countries around the world. Mike Pender's Searchers continue to book new shows and tour, though infrequently, Mike Pender tends to perform as a solo artist these days. In 1994, Mike Pender's Searchers were the first 1960s band to be invited to play on board the QE2 as part of the ocean liner's 25th anniversary celebrations. During live performances, Mike Pender's Searchers use their own custom built lighting and sound equipment, and Mike Pender uses several different guitars including his famous 12-string Rickenbacker. Mike Pender and his 12-string guitar are referenced in the book Electric Guitars, The Illustrated Encyclopedia, by the author and guitar enthusiast Tony Bacon.

== Members ==
=== Current members ===
- Mike Pender - Vocals, Guitar (1985–Present)
- Barrie Cowell - Vocals, Bass Guitar (1985–Present)
- Keith Roberts - Vocals, Guitar
- Mike Pender Jr. - Vocals, Drums

=== Former Members ===
- Chris Black - Vocals, Guitar
- Paul Jackson - Vocals, Guitar
- Kevin Healey - Vocals, Guitar
- Steve Carlisle - Drums

== Discography ==
=== CD albums ===
- That Was Then This Is Now
- Mike Pender's Searchers
- Sweets for My Sweet
- Best of Mike Pender's Searchers
- Needles & Pins

=== Singles ===
- It's Over"/"Brother and Sisters" 7" and 12" versions credited to Mike Pender (Mike Pender's Searchers did not release any singles)

=== DVDs ===
- The British Invasion Returns with Mike Pender's Searchers, Herman's Hermits Starring Peter Noone, Wayne Fontana from The Mindbenders, The Troggs, Gerry Marsden of Gerry & The Pacemakers

=== CD compilation albums (various artists) ===
- Forever Gold: Gold Collection: Party Favorites
- Rolling Back the Years: The 60s
- Rock N' Roll Reunion: 1964
- Top Ten Hits of the Sixties: Your Favourite Sixties Supergroups
- UK No. 1 Hits Of The 60s CD
- Merseybeat – Mike Pender's Searchers with Billy J Kramer and Fourmost (1CD)
- The Greatest Hits Of Tug Boat Records
- The British 60s Volume 3
- Rolling Back The Years The 60s
- The Best of the Love Songs
- Hits Of The 60s
- Dreamtime: Volume 2
- Fab Sixties Boxed set
- Hits of the 60's
- Hits of The Searchers/Gerry & the Pacemakers – British 60's CD featuring 10 cuts from Mike Pender's Searchers and 10 cuts from Gerry Marsden

=== Traveling Wrinklies ===
(with Mike Pender, Brian Poole, Clem Curtis, Tony Crane and Reg Presley of The Troggs)

- "Ain't Nothing But A House Party"
