= Johnny Sandon =

English musician (1941–1996)

- Also known as: Johnny Sandon; Billy Beck
- Born: Willian Francis Beck; 27 May 1941; Liverpool, England
- Died: 23 December 1996 (aged 55) Birkenhead, Merseyside, England
- Genre: Rock
- Occupation: Singer
- Instrument: Vocals
- Years active: 1950s–1996
- Formerly of: The Searchers

Johnny Sandon (originally named William "Billy" Francis Beck, 27 May 1941 – 23 December 1996) was a British musician, best known for being an early rock and roll singer who was part of the Merseybeat phenomenon in the early 1960s.

Sandon started singing at age twelve and in 1958 appeared on TV programme Opportunity Knocks. The mothers of Sandon and John McNally both worked at the same bakery, and it was McNally's mother who suggested that John add him to the group. Sandon's first gig as The Searchers frontman was at St Luke's Hall in Crosby. His stagename, Johnny Sandon, was recommended by John-based on The Sandon, a pub near Anfield stadium. Sandon led the Searchers from 1960 to February 1962, playing his last gig at the Cavern club on 28 February 1962. He then joined The Remo Four for one year, before leaving to pursue a solo career. He appeared on ITV talent show New Faces on 6 November 1976.

== Death ==
Sandon suffered from depression, and committed suicide on 24 December 1996, aged 55. He was discovered hanging in his bathroom by his daughter at his home. At the time of his death, he was a taxi driver and was living at 31 St Paul's Close in Birkenhead.

== Discography ==
Studio vinyl singles

- Yes / Magic Potion – Johnny Sandon And The Remo Four (Single),1963
- Lies – Johnny Sandon And The Remo Four (Single) Pye Records, 1963
- The Blizzard (Single) Pye Records, 1964
- Sixteen Tons / The Blizzard (Single)
- Donna Means Heartbreak / Some Kinda Wonderful (Single) Pye Records, 1964

Studio albums

- Compilations, Tommy Quickly, Johnny Sandon, Gregoly Philips
