= He's Got No Love =

1965 single by the Searchers

- West German picture sleeve

Single by the Searchers
- B-side: "So Far Away"
- Released: 2 July 1965
- Length: 2:37
- Label: Pye (UK); Kapp (US)
- Songwriters: Chris Curtis, Mike Pender
- Producer: Tony Hatch

The Searchers singles chronology
"Goodbye My Lover Goodbye" (1965)	"He's Got No Love" (1965)	"When I Get Home" (1965)

"He’s Got No Love" is a song written by Chris Curtis and Mike Pender and released by the English rock band the Searchers. The song was released as a single in July 1965 by Pye Records in the United Kingdom and later on Kapp Records in the United States. It became a hit in 1965 in both countries.

== Overview ==
Mike Pender has stated that he wrote the music and Chris Curtis the lyrics. "I played the slide guitar figure and the chord sequence to Chris. He put down the lyrics and we both came up with the group’s first self-penned Top 20 hit." According to Frank Allen's book, guitarist John McNally helped with the music part. Chris Curtis was equally dismissive of the song, claiming that they stole the tune off the Rolling Stones' The Last Time (inspired by "This May Be the Last Time", a traditional gospel song by The Staple Singers). In fact both songs were built on similar guitar riffs, but melodically they're different.

== Recording and release ==
Pender purchased a Rickenbacker twelve-string semi-acoustic in order that the band could successfully reproduce the distinctive sound. It was the Rose Morris model 1993. On top of Mike's arpeggios John McNally's Telecaster overlaid a six-string figure enhanced by putting it through a tremolo effect and taking the chord down a tone and up again in a constantly repeating and almost hypnotic pattern. He's Got No Love was released as a single b/w So Far Way (another Curtis/Pender composition) on the Pye label in the UK on 2 July 1965 (Pye NPL 15878), and later on Kapp Records (Kapp-686) in the US. Record had quite positive reception. "It moves along with a tremendous beat and has an unusual backing with a great guitar sound," was written by Music Echo. It was the most successful self-penned song by the band members. The Searchers were booked to appear on Thank Your Lucky Stars with the song, Frank Allen missed the show while he was in the Bahamas. To resolve the situation the bass player with the folk group the Settlers deputised for him, standing way back in the line-up, in shadow and with no close-ups. It did not however go unnoticed and rumours flew that Frank Allen had left the band.

== Charts ==
"He's Got No Love" reached No. 12 on the UK Singles Chart (Record Retailer) and No. 10 on New Musical Express (which featured the group on its front page at the same week). In the US, it peaked at No. 79 (Billboard) and No. 88 (Cashbox).

Chart (1965)	Peak position
UK Singles Chart	12
US Billboard Hot 100	79
Canada	17
Netherlands	14
Sweden (Tio i Topp)	14

== Personnel ==
The Searchers

- Mike Pender – lead guitar, lead vocals
- John McNally – rhythm guitar, backing vocals
- Frank Allen – bass, backing vocals
- Chris Curtis – drums, backing vocals

Additional musicians and production

- Tony Hatch – producer, piano
- Ray Prickett – recording engineer
