= Desdemona (Searchers song) =

Single by The Searchers

from the album Second Take
- B-side: "The World Is Waiting for Tomorrow"
- Released: August 1971 (U.S.)
- Recorded: 1971
- Genre: Rock, pop
- Length: 2:20
- Label: RCA Victor
- Songwriters: Valerie Avon & Harold Spiro
- Producer: David Paramor

The Searchers singles chronology
"Kinky Kathy Abernathy" (1969)	"Desdemona" (1971)	"Love Is Everywhere" (1971)

"Desdemona" is a song recorded in 1971 by The Searchers. It was their final charting single and their first in the U.S. following an almost five-year hiatus.

The song was the first of two singles from their Second Take LP, and the only one to chart. It was written by the songwriting team of Valerie Murtagh and Harold Spiro. The B-side was a non-album track.

"Desdemona" reached No. 94 on the U.S. Billboard Hot 100 and No. 79 on Cash Box. It did not chart outside the United States.

== Chart history ==
Chart (1971)	Peak position
U.S. Billboard Hot 100	94
U.S. Cash Box Top 100	79
