= Iron Door Club =

Coordinates: 53.407°N 2.988°W

The Iron Door Club
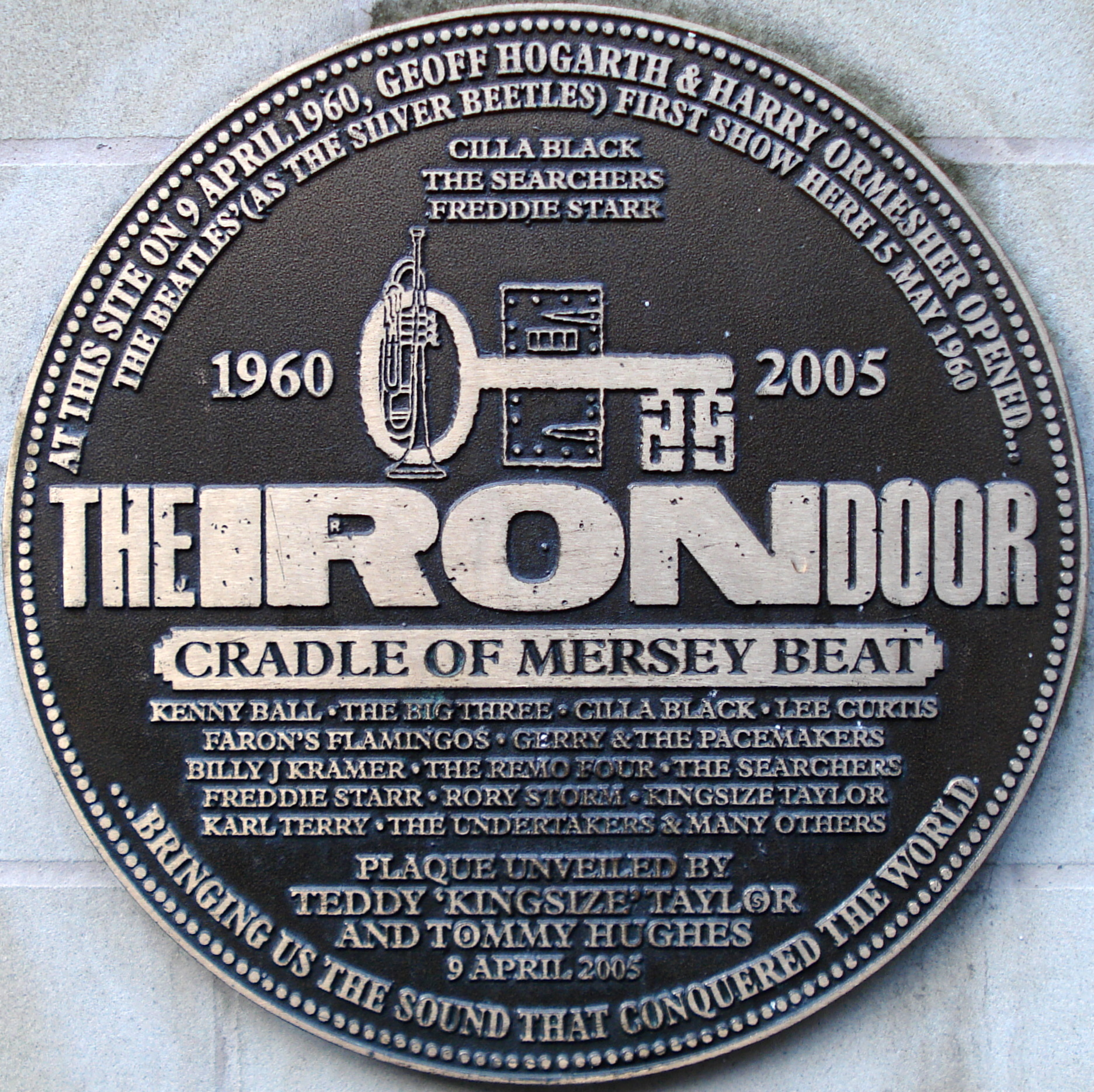
- Plaque commemorating The Iron Door Club
- Interactive map of The Iron Door Club
- Location: 13 Temple Street, Liverpool, England, United Kingdom
- Owner: Geoffrey Hogarth, Harry Ormesher
- Capacity: 1,650-1,900
- Type: Music club
- Events: Entertainment, night club

Construction
- Opened: 1960
- Closed: 1964

The Iron Door Club was a music venue at 13 Temple Street, Liverpool, England founded by Geoff Hogarth and Harry Ormesher. It opened in May 1960 and closed in 1964. The Searchers played there regularly and it was the first venue where the Beatles played under that name (strictly, the name they used there on 15 May 1960 was "Silver Beetles", having played at Liverpool's Lathom Hall as the Silver Beats on the previous night). The television performance by the band The Undertakers singing "Mashed Potato" was filmed at the Iron Door Club in 1963.

When the club first opened as licensed premises in 1960, it had a capacity of some 1,650 people. In 1963, the adjacent warehouse was acquired. The basement and the ground floors of the two buildings were opened up into single spaces. In 1961 it became the Liverpool Jazz Society, and in 1962 the venue became the Storyville Jazz Club. In September 1962 the venue reverted to being known as the Iron Door Club once again. After the club closed in 1964 the premises became the Pyramid Club.

The Iron Door Club is also the name of a Derby-based band which is inspired by 1960s bands such as the Searchers, who played at the original venue during its existence.
