= Billy Adamson =

Scottish musician (1944–2013)

- Born: William Adamson; 27 May 1944; Peebles, Scotland
- Died: 11 November 2013 (aged 69) France
- Genres: Rock, pop
- Occupations: Drummer, percussionist
- Years active: 1963–1998
- Formerly of: The Searchers, The Luvvers

Billy Adamson (27 May 1944 – 11 November 2013) was a Scottish musician, best known as the longtime drummer and percussionist for the English pop rock band The Searchers. He joined them shortly after their most famous period in 1969 and remained with them until 1998. He also worked with Lulu, The Nashville Teens and Junior Campbell.

== Early life ==
William Adamson was born on 27 May 1944 in Peebles and grew up in Glasgow. His band, the Bellrocks, had featured a talented young singer Marie Lawrie who was eventually to become a major star known by the name of Lulu. Adamson was even a member of Lulu & The Luvvers for some time. He also worked or recorded with Emile Ford & the Checkmates, Jet Harris, The Nashville Teens, P. P. Arnold, Screaming Lord Sutch, black American soul singer Sonny Child & the TNT, or The Clan (incl. Marmalade's Junior Campbell or Cliff Bennett). "Billy was a brilliant, stylish drummer of the old school who could read drum parts," Junior Campbell said about him.

== The Searchers years ==
In 1969, he replaced John Blunt in The Searchers and became the longest serving drummer in the group. "We set up an audition at my house in Harlington and ran through a few numbers with the bespectacled, afro-coiffeured drummer in the small living room," Frank Allen wrote. "After a bit of humming and haahing we decided to offer him the job." Adamson played on the last Searchers' hit single "Desdemona" as well as the band's LP Second Take, and some more singles sessions. The Searchers were three partners at the time (Mike Pender, John McNally, Frank Allen) and Billy Adamson was an employee of the band. That means he played on all tours and shows, but in the 1970s and 1980s he did not record with the band, although Mike Pender and Frank Allen both admired his drumming skills and style in their autobiographies. That was also the reason for his leaving of the band, he felt his position within the set-up should be different. Nevertheless, he played with the band for 30 years.

== Later years and death ==
Adamson made the decision to leave the Searchers in 1998, officially to spend more time with his family. He died on 11 November 2013 in France, aged 69.
