= Goodbye My Lover Goodbye =

Single by The Searchers

from the album The Searchers
- B-side: "'Till I Met You"
- Released: 1965
- Recorded: 1964
- Genre: Rock and roll
- Length: 3:20
- Label: Pye
- Songwriters: Robert Mosely; Leroy Swearingen; Lamar Simington

The Searchers singles chronology
"I Don't Want to Go On Without You" (1965)	"Goodbye My Lover Goodbye" (1965)	"He's Got No Love" (1965)

"Goodbye My Lover Goodbye" is a popular song written by Robert Mosely, Leroy Swearingen and Lamar Simington. The song was first recorded in 1963 by Robert Mosely and released as the B-side of "Crazy 'Bout My Baby" by Capitol Records.

In 1964, the song was recorded by The Searchers, which released the song in Europe under the title "Goodbye My Love", achieving an international hit. The Searchers version reached number 4 in the United Kingdom, number 7 in Ireland, and number 7 on the Dutch charts. Mosely's recording of the song is included on the soundtrack of the 2018 film Green Book.

== Charts ==
The Searchers version
Chart (1965)	Peak position
Australia Kent Music Report	25
Canada RPM	12
Dutch Top 40	7
Germany (GfK Entertainment charts)	16
Irish Singles Chart	7
UK Singles Chart	4
US Billboard Hot 100	52
