= Sugar and Spice (The Searchers song) =

Single by The Searchers

from the album Sugar and Spice
- B-side: "Saints and Searchers"
- Released: 22 October 1963
- Genre: Merseybeat
- Length: 2:16
- Label: Pye 7N15566 (UK); Liberty 55646 and 55689 (US)
- Songwriter: Fred Nightingale

The Searchers singles chronology
"Sweets for My Sweet" (1963)	"Sugar and Spice" (1963)	"Sweet Nothins" (1963)

"Sugar and Spice" is a 1963 song by Merseybeat band The Searchers written by Tony Hatch under the pseudonym Fred Nightingale. It made #2 on the UK charts (on Pye), #44 in the USA charts, and #11 in the Canadian CHUM Charts. The Searchers recorded a German interpretation of the song entitled Süß ist sie , and also the French rendering C'est De Notre Age. , released in both countries by French Record Label, Disques Vogue.

== Background ==
The composer and producer of "Sugar and Spice", Tony Hatch, had produced the precedent Searchers' single: a cover of the Drifters' "Sweets for My Sweet", which had afforded the Searchers a #1 UK hit. Hatch, having written "Sugar and Spice" on the template of "Sweets for My Sweet", pitched his original song to the Searchers as the work of an as-yet unknown songwriter named Fred Nightingale, as Hatch felt the group might be dismissive of the song if they knew it to be their producer's work.

The first line of the chorus,"Sugar and spice and all things nice", references the nursery rhyme What Are Little Boys Made Of?, while the following line is the title of the well-known Pete Seeger/ Lee Hays composition "Kisses Sweeter than Wine".

== Cover versions ==
Covers included a take by:

- The Cryan' Shames, whose version was released in 1966 on the Chicago-based Destination label. The song became a local and regional hit for the band and finally peaked at #49 on the Billboard Hot 100 chart. and also #49 in Canada. The Cryan' Shames' recording was included on the influential 1972 compilation Nuggets: Original Artyfacts from the First Psychedelic Era, 1965–1968.
