= The Searchers (band) =

English rock band

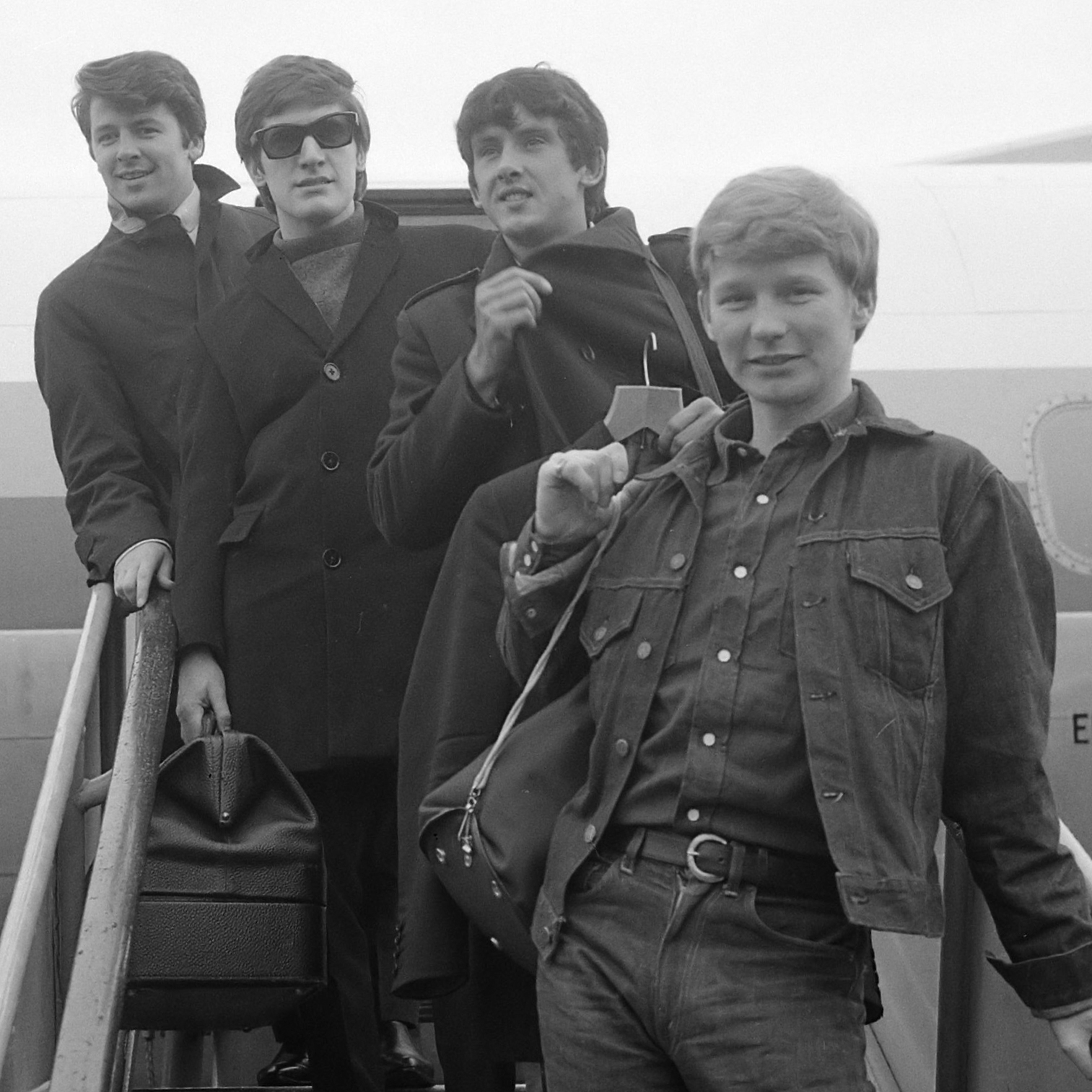
- The Searchers in 1965; Left to right: Mike Pender, Chris Curtis, Frank Allen, John McNally

Background information
- Origin: Liverpool, England
- Genres: Merseybeat; pop; rock
- Years active: 1959–2019; 2023–2025
- Labels: UK: Pye; Philips; Liberty; RCA; Sire; US: Mercury; Liberty; Kapp; RCA; Sire
- Spinoffs: Mike Pender's Searchers
- Past members: John McNally; Mike Pender; Chris Curtis; Tony Jackson; Frank Allen; John Blunt; Billy Adamson; Spencer James; Eddie Rothe; Scott Ottaway; Richie Burns; Joe Kennedy; Tony West; Ron Woodbridge; Brian Dolan; Johnny Sandon
- Website: the-searchers.co.uk

The Searchers were an English rock band formed in Liverpool in 1959. Part of the Merseybeat scene, they flourished during the British Invasion of the 1960s, with hits including "Sweets for My Sweet", "Love Potion No. 9", "Sugar and Spice", "Needles and Pins", "Don't Throw Your Love Away", "Some Day We're Gonna Love Again", "When You Walk in the Room", "What Have They Done to the Rain", "Goodbye My Love" and "He's Got No Love". With the Swinging Blue Jeans, the Searchers tied for being the second group from Liverpool, after the Beatles, to have a hit in the US, when their "Needles and Pins" and the Swinging Blue Jeans' "Hippy Hippy Shake" both reached the Hot 100 on 7 March 1964. In June 2025, the Searchers played their "final show ever" at the Glastonbury Festival.

== Band history ==
=== Origins ===
The band was founded as a skiffle group in Liverpool in 1959 by guitarist John McNally and guitarist/singer Mike Pender, and took their name from the 1956 John Ford western film The Searchers.

The band grew out of an earlier skiffle group called the Army Generations formed by McNally in 1955, with his friends Ron Woodbridge on vocals and guitar, Tony West on bass and Joe Kennedy on drums. In March 1957, they were joined by guitarist Brian Dolan. In 1959, the Army Generations changed their name to the Searchers. When Woodbridge, West and Dolan all lost interest, McNally and Kennedy were joined by Pender and lead singer/bassist Tony Jackson, with the new line-up initially playing gigs as "Tony and the Searchers".

=== 1960–1984 ===
In 1960, Jackson, Pender and McNally were joined by new drummer Chris Curtis and lead singer Johnny Sandon. The band had regular bookings at Liverpool's Iron Door Club as Johnny Sandon and the Searchers. Sandon left the band in late 1961 to join the Remo Four. The group settled into a quartet named the Searchers, with Jackson then doubling as lead singer and bassist. They continued to play at the Iron Door, The Cavern, and other Liverpool clubs. Like many similar acts they would do as many as three shows at different venues in one night. They negotiated a contract with the Star-Club in the St. Pauli district of Hamburg for 128 days, with three one-hour performances a night, starting in July 1962.

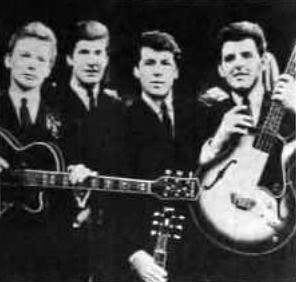
The original line-up of the Searchers in early 1964. Left to right: John McNally, Chris Curtis, Mike Pender, Tony Jackson.

The band returned to a residency at the Iron Door Club and it was there that they tape-recorded the sessions that led to a Pye Records recording contract with Tony Hatch as producer. The first single, "Sweets for My Sweet", featuring Tony Jackson as main vocalist supported by Pender and Curtis, shot to No. 1 in the UK in 1963, firmly establishing the band as a major spearhead of the "Merseybeat" boom, just behind the Beatles and alongside Gerry and the Pacemakers. Their first album, Meet the Searchers, sung mostly by Jackson and Pender, was released in August 1963 and reached No. 2 on the British album charts the next month. "Love Potion No.9", sung by Jackson, was later lifted from the LP as a US-only single and became one of the band's biggest US hits in 1965.

Hatch played piano on some recordings and wrote "Sugar and Spice", the band's second single and a UK No. 2 hit, under the pseudonym Fred Nightingale, a secret he kept from the band at the time. Apparently Curtis disliked this song (largely a revamp of the key aspects of first hits) and refused to sing on it. Jackson again took lead vocal, though Curtis later agreed to sing the distinctive high-harmony vocal links between verses. The Searchers' second album Sugar and Spice was quickly issued in late 1963, consisting of tracks not used on the first album and others, plus the second single.

In the US, "Sweets for My Sweet" was issued on Mercury and "Sugar and Spice" on Liberty, both without success; then a deal was arranged with US-based Kapp Records to distribute their records in America. In the UK, Philips Records then released an earlier recording they held of a cover of Brenda Lee's hit "Sweet Nuthins", which dismayed the group. It made the lower end of the UK chart, but did not disturb their momentum.

In the 1964 film Saturday Night Out, the group played the title song of the soundtrack. Mike Pender took the main lead vocal on the next two singles, both of which topped the UK charts, "Needles and Pins" and "Don't Throw Your Love Away", each featuring Chris Curtis on co-lead/high-harmony vocal, though live footage of these songs, as performed on The Ed Sullivan Show and NME Poll Winners concert respectively, show Pender and Jackson singing the lead vocal together in close harmony, with vocal support from Curtis. Both tracks also featured a distinct 12-string electric guitar sound, which was actually dual 6-strings. This combination of vocal harmonies and the sound of a 12-string guitar would provide a key influence for American band the Byrds. The group's third album, It's the Searchers, was issued in May 1964.

In mid-1964, bassist Tony Jackson, who had gone from being lead singer to being only allowed one co-lead vocal on their third album (on "Sho' Know A Lot About Love"), left the band and was replaced by a Searchers' Hamburg pal Frank Allen from Cliff Bennett and the Rebel Rousers. Jackson was then signed to Pye as a solo act and, backed by the Vibrations, issued a few singles of which the first, "Bye Bye Baby", charted in the UK in 1964. He also re-cut "Love Potion No. 9" but it failed to chart. The last Searchers single recorded with Jackson was "Some Day We're Gonna Love Again".

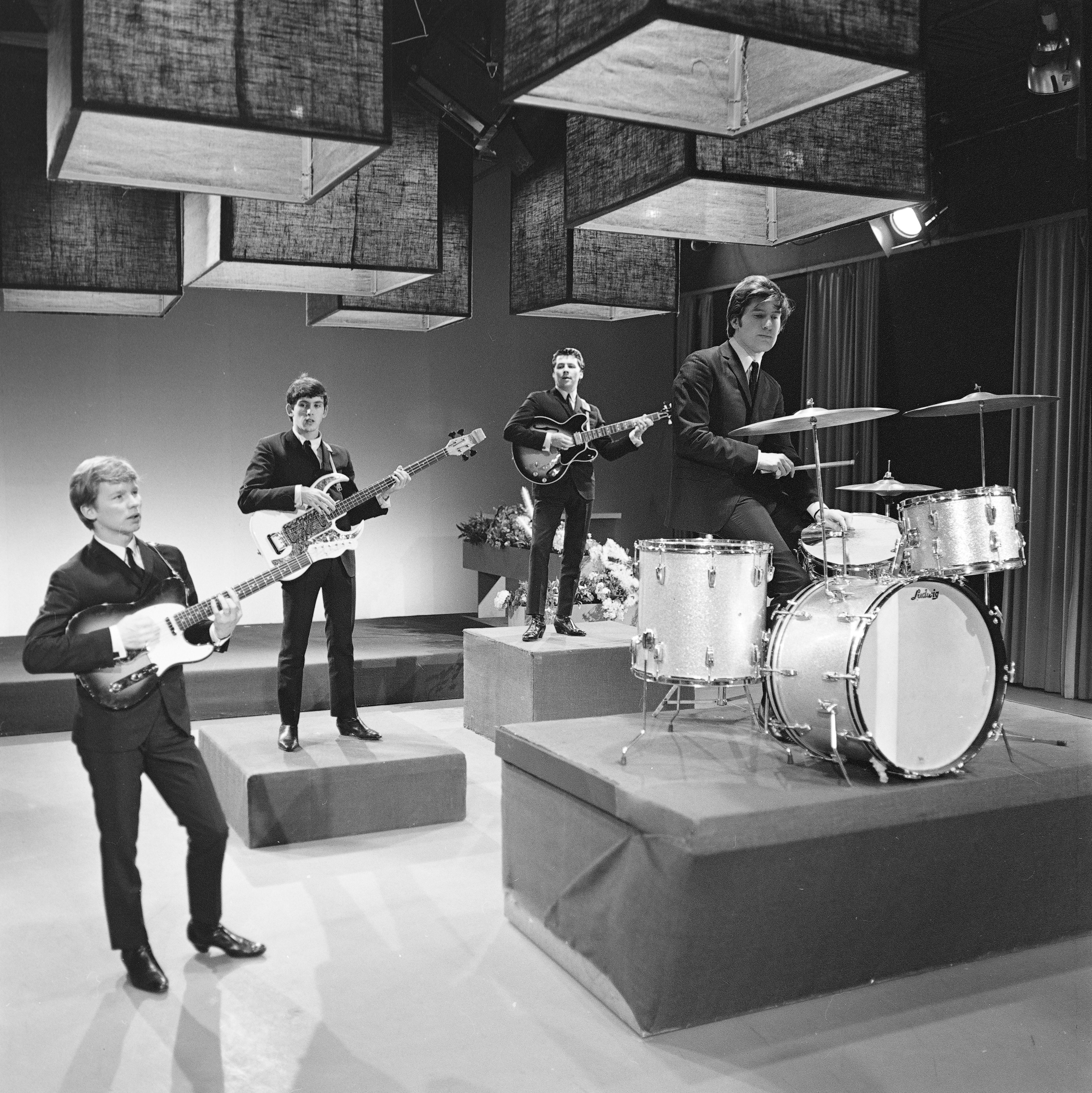
The Searchers in late 1964 with new member Frank Allen (second from left) replacing Jackson.

Frank Allen's debut single with the band, a cover of Jackie DeShannon's "When You Walk in the Room", by then featuring John McNally’s actual 12-string Rickenbacker guitar, peaked at No. 3 in the UK. At the end of 1964, the group scored another UK hit with "What Have They Done to the Rain" and released the EP The Searchers Play The System, featuring four songs from the soundtrack to the film The System.

The Searchers began 1965 with another hit single "Goodbye My Love" and their fourth album Sounds Like Searchers, though as the year progressed, they would see a decline in their popularity. Their next two singles, the Curtis-Pender original "He's Got No Love" and Bobby Darin's "When I Get Home", would only be minor hits. Curtis' decision to release the latter as a single, and its relative chart failure, undermined his position as song selector for the band, and some internal disagreements resurfaced over musical policy and direction that had been evident earlier when Tony Jackson had left. Late 1965 brought the band's fifth album Take Me for What I'm Worth, with its title track also issued as a single.

As was common with British artists in the 1960s, the Searchers' album releases were altered for the US market, with the inclusion of UK non-album singles and EP tracks. The first five UK Searchers albums - Meet the Searchers (August 1963), Sugar and Spice (November 1963), It's the Searchers (May 1964), Sounds Like Searchers (March 1965), and Take Me for What I'm Worth (November 1965) - were reconfigured in the US as Meet the Searchers/Needles and Pins (March 1964), This Is Us (August 1964), The New Searchers LP (February 1965), The Searchers No. 4 (September 1965), and Take Me for What I'm Worth (February 1966).

Curtis left the band in early 1966. His departure was a major blow, as he had been chief songwriter, song selector, and the key high harmony voice, as well as a figurehead member and the main PR man. He was replaced by the Keith Moon-influenced John Blunt. In 1967, Curtis formed a new band called Roundabout with keyboard player Jon Lord and guitarist Ritchie Blackmore. Curtis's involvement in the project was short-lived; Roundabout evolved into Deep Purple the following year.

As musical styles evolved, 1966 saw the Searchers attempt to move with the times, releasing a cover of the Rolling Stones' "Take It Or Leave it" as their first single with Blunt, though it was only minor UK chart hit. The follow-up single was a cover of the Hollies' "Have You Ever Loved Somebody", issued in late 1966. Around the same time, Pye's budget label Marble Arch issued the first Searchers compilation album Smash Hits, while Smash Hits Vol. 2 would follow in 1967. Marble Arch would also reissue two of the group's earlier studio albums, Sugar and Spice and It's the Searchers, with new album covers in 1967 and 1968 respectively.

After three unsuccessful singles during 1967 - "Popcorn, Double Feature", "Western Union" and "Secondhand Dealer" - Pye chose to drop the group after their original contract expired at the end of the year. The band then began playing the British cabaret circuit. They signed with Liberty Records, though none of the singles the group released for the label were successful, and no album appeared during this period. At the beginning of 1970, John Blunt was replaced by Billy Adamson. In 1971, the group signed to RCA Records and achieved a minor US hit with "Desdemona". It was followed by an album of re-recorded hits titled Second Take, though it was overshadowed by Pye's Golden Hour of the Searchers compilation of the original hits that came out at the same time. Despite recording new material, including covers of Neil Sedaka's "Solitaire" and the Bee Gees' "Spicks and Specks", which were issued as RCA singles with scant promotion, much of their new work was not issued at the time, and RCA later dropped the group.

The group continued to tour through the 1970s, playing both the expected old hits as well as contemporary songs such as an extended live version of Neil Young's "Southern Man". They were rewarded in 1979 when Sire Records signed them to a multi-record deal. Two albums were released: The Searchers and Play for Today (retitled Love's Melodies outside the UK). Both records garnered critical acclaim and featured some original tracks, as well as covers of songs such as Alex Chilton's "September Gurls" and John Fogerty's "Almost Saturday Night". But with scant promotion and little if any radio airplay, they did not break into the charts. The first album was quickly revamped following release with a few extra tracks added, one song dropped (a cover of Bob Dylan's "Coming from the Heart"), and a new sleeve.

The albums did, however, revive the group's career, because concerts from then on alternated classic hits with the newer songs that were well received. A Sire single, "Hearts in Her Eyes", written by Will Birch and John Wicks of the Records, and successfully updating their distinctive 12-string guitars/vocal harmonies sound, picked up some radio airplay. Meanwhile, PRT Records actively promoted the group's sixties back catalogue, with compilations such as The Searchers File and Spotlight on the Searchers, which were on sale at group gigs, along with the Sire albums, and helped re-establish them. According to John McNally, the band was ready to head into the studio to record a third album for Sire when they were informed that, due to label reorganisation, their contract had been dropped.

In 1981, the band signed to PRT Records (formerly Pye, their original label) and began recording an album. But only one single, "I Don't Want to Be the One" backed with "Hollywood", ended up being released. They promoted this with a UK Television appearance on "The Leo Sayer Show", which was rare for them by then, but the single got little if any radio airplay. The rest of the tracks, except one, would be included as part of 1992's The Searchers 30th Anniversary Collection 1962-1992.

=== 1985–2025 ===
After a farewell performance in London in December 1985, Mike Pender left the group to form a new band and now tours as Mike Pender's Searchers (originally a permanent band but now made up of musicians hired as necessary), performing Searchers' songs and some new material of his own. McNally, Allen and Adamson recruited former First Class vocalist Spencer James as Pender's replacement.

In 1988, Coconut Records signed the Searchers and the album Hungry Hearts was the result. It featured updated remakes of "Needles and Pins" and "Sweets for My Sweet" plus live favorite "Somebody Told Me You Were Crying". While the album was not a major hit, it did keep the group in the public eye.

The band continued to tour, with Eddie Rothe replacing Adamson on drums. Original singer and bassist Tony Jackson died on 18 August 2003, aged 65, while original drummer Chris Curtis died on 28 February 2005, aged 63. Both Jackson and Curtis died in Liverpool. Early bassist Tony West died in his sleep in Hightown, Merseyside on 11 November 2010, aged 72. In 2010, Eddie Rothe left the Searchers after becoming engaged to singer Jane McDonald, and was replaced on 26 February by Scott Ottaway. Rothe died on 26 March 2021, aged 67. Billy Adamson, the band's drummer from 1970 to 1998, died in France on 11 November 2013, aged 69. In September 2017, John McNally had a stroke and stood aside from the band for two months to recover.

In 2018, the Searchers announced that the band would be retiring, and they ended their farewell tour on 31 March 2019. They did not rule out the possibility of a reunion tour, and it was announced on the band's website in 2021 that they would undertake a further farewell tour in 2023, this time with drummer Richard Burns. In August 2023, Frank Allen announced that the band were to be doing yet another farewell tour in 2024. Joe Kennedy, an early drummer for the Searchers who later served in the United States Navy, died on 21 November 2023, aged 81. John Blunt, the band's drummer from 1966 to 1970, died on 13 March 2024.

In 2025, the band announced a UK tour for June, including their final appearance at their first time slot at Glastonbury. In June 2025, it was announced early vocalist Ron Woodbridge had died. The Searchers gave their last performance on 27 June 2025 at the Glastonbury Festival 2025.

== Members ==
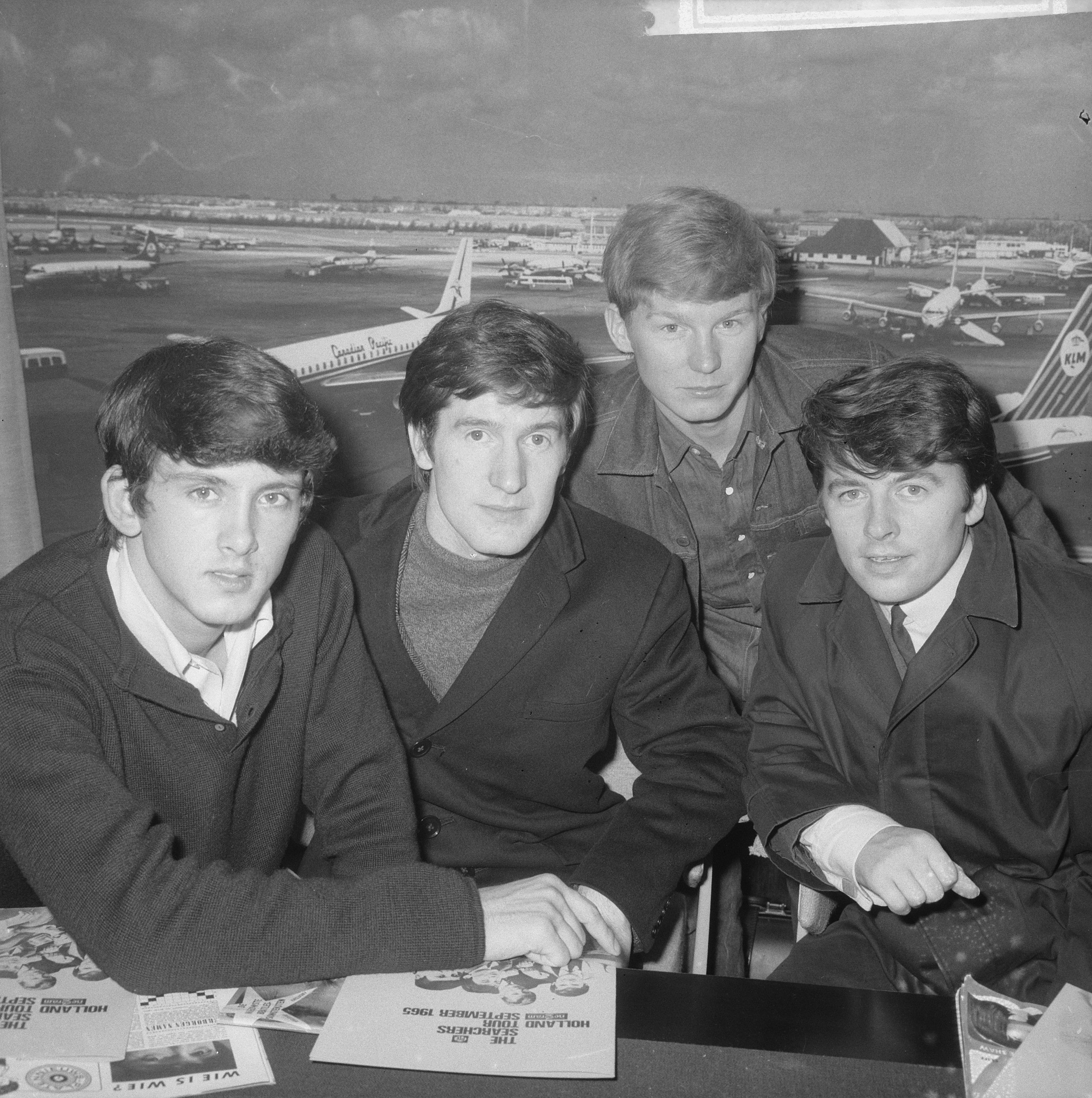
The Searchers in 1965. From left: Allen, Curtis, McNally, Pender

=== Final lineup ===
- John McNally – rhythm and lead guitar, backing vocals (1959–2025)
- Frank Allen – bass, backing and lead vocals (1964–2025)
- Spencer James – lead vocals, rhythm guitar, guitar synthesizer (1985–2025)
- Richie Burns – drums, backing vocals (2023–2025)

=== Former members ===
- Mike Pender – lead and backing vocals, lead and rhythm guitar (1959–1985)
- Tony Jackson – lead and backing vocals, bass (1959–1964; died 2003)
- Chris Curtis – drums, backing vocals (1960–1966; died 2005)
- John Blunt – drums (1966–1970; died 2024)
- Billy Adamson – drums (1970–1998; died 2013)
- Eddie Rothe – drums, backing vocals (1998–2010; died 2021)
- Scott Ottaway – drums, backing vocals (2010–2019)

=== Early members ===
- Joe Kennedy – drums (1959–1960; died 2023)
- Brian Dolan – lead guitar (1959)
- Tony West – bass (1959; died 2010)
- Ron Woodbridge – lead vocals (1959; died 2025)
- Johnny Sandon – lead vocals (1960–1962; died 1996)

=== Formative band lineups ===
1955 – 1957 (The Army Generations)	1957 – 1959 (The Army Generations until January 1959, the Searchers from January 1959)	1959 – 1960 (Tony and the Searchers)	1960 – February 1962 (Johnny Sandon and the Searchers)
John McNally – lead guitar; Joe Kennedy: drums; Tony West – bass; Ron Woodbridge – vocals, rhythm guitar	John McNally – rhythm guitar; Joe Kennedy – drums; Tony West – bass; Ron Woodbridge – vocals; Brian Dolan – lead guitar	John McNally – rhythm guitar, backing vocals; Joe Kennedy – drums; Tony Jackson – bass, lead vocals; Mike Pender – lead guitar, backing vocals	John McNally – rhythm guitar, backing vocals; Tony Jackson – bass, backing vocals; Mike Pender – lead guitar, backing vocals; Chris Curtis – drums, backing vocals; Johnny Sandon – lead vocals

=== The Searchers lineups ===
February 1962 – August 1964	August 1964 – March 1966	March 1966 – January 1970	January 1970 – December 1985
John McNally – rhythm guitar, vocals; Mike Pender – lead guitar, vocals; Chris Curtis – drums, vocals; Tony Jackson – bass, vocals	John McNally – rhythm guitar, vocals; Mike Pender – lead guitar, vocals; Chris Curtis – drums, vocals; Frank Allen – bass, vocals	John McNally – rhythm guitar, vocals; Mike Pender – lead guitar, vocals; Frank Allen – bass, vocals; John Blunt – drums	John McNally – rhythm guitar, vocals; Mike Pender – lead guitar, vocals; Frank Allen – bass, vocals; Billy Adamson – drums
December 1985 – November 1998	November 1998 – February 2010	February 2010 – March 2019	March 2019 – April 2023
John McNally – lead guitar, vocals; Frank Allen – bass, vocals; Billy Adamson – drums; Spencer James – rhythm guitar, guitar synthesizer, vocals	John McNally – lead guitar, vocals; Frank Allen – bass, vocals; Spencer James – rhythm guitar, guitar synthesizer, vocals; Eddie Rothe – drums, vocals	John McNally – lead guitar, vocals; Frank Allen – bass, vocals; Spencer James – rhythm guitar, guitar synthesizer, vocals; Scott Ottaway – drums, vocals	Disbanded
April 2023 – June 2025
John McNally – lead guitar, vocals; Frank Allen – bass, vocals; Spencer James – rhythm guitar, guitar synthesizer, vocals; Richie Burns – drums, vocals

== Discography ==
Studio Albums

- 1963 – Meet the Searchers
- 1963 – Sugar and Spice
- 1964 – It's the Searchers
- 1965 – Sounds Like Searchers
- 1965 – Take Me for What I'm Worth
- 1972 – Second Take
- 1979 – Searchers
- 1981 – Play for Today
- 1988 – Hungry Hearts
