= Frank Allen (bassist) =

English musician (born 1943)

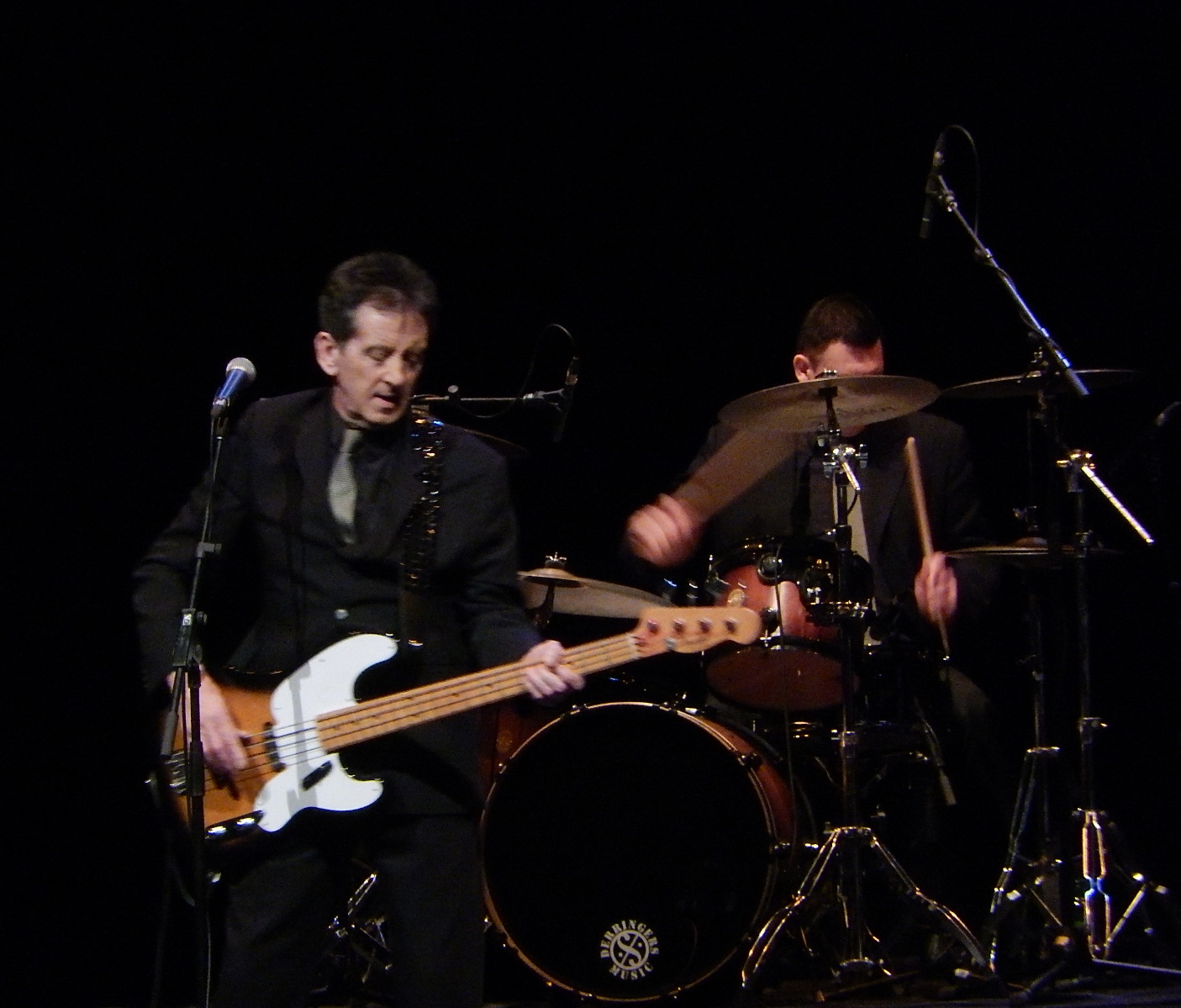
- Allen performing with The Searchers in 2015

Background information
- Born: Francis Renaud McNeice; 14 December 1943 (age 82); Hayes, Middlesex, England
- Genres: Beat; rock; pop
- Occupation: Musician
- Instruments: Bass, vocals
- Years active: 1961–present
- Formerly of: Cliff Bennett and the Rebel Rousers, The Searchers

Frank Allen (born Francis Renaud McNeice; 14 December 1943) is an English bass guitarist and singer, who was a long-time member of The Searchers.

== Biography ==
Allen's career started aged fifteen in 1958, playing guitar in his own band called The Skyways at local venues such as The Clay Pigeon in Eastcote. Frank started playing bass guitar with Cliff Bennett and the Rebel Rousers during the early 1960s. Allen joined Cliff Bennett and the Rebel Rousers as rhythm guitarist in 1961. He eventually changed over to bass guitar in early 1962, following the departure of Ben Jordan.

When Tony Jackson left the Searchers in August 1964, Allen was asked to join the group. They then recorded "When You Walk in the Room", with Mike Pender and Frank Allen singing a dual lead line. He remained with them until they played their final gig in March 2019, when the Searchers retired the band. Allen has continued to perform with the group since their revival in 2023. Allen wrote a book of touring recollections called Travelling Man in 1999. His definitive and detailed biography of the Searchers entitled The Searchers And Me – A History of the Legendary Sixties Hitmakers was published in April 2009.

== Influences ==
Allen was heavily influenced by American rock and roll artists of the 1950s:

The only mentors were the early rock and roll stars. It was Elvis and the Everly Brothers and Buddy Holly and people like that, Little Richard, Fats Domino. In the main, Elvis changed everything for me. Lonnie Donegan of course in England. I suppose Lonnie to a very great extent because, although skiffle was a very short-lived fad and it was a very simple, very crude style of music, it allowed anyone who could play anything on a guitar at all to believe they can get up on stage and do something without any great amount of talent. Three chords and you were away, you could play with your friends and you could all hide each other’s faults.

== Discography ==
=== With Cliff Bennett and the Rebel Rousers ===
Cliff Bennett singles	Cliff Bennett EPs
July 1961: "You've Got What I Like" / "I'm in Love With You"; October 1961: "That's What I Said" / "When I Get Paid"; March 1962: "Poor Joe" / "Hurtin' Inside"; July 1963: "Everybody Loves A Lover" / "My Old Stand By"; November 1963: "You Really Got A Hold on Me" / "Alright"; March 1964: "Got My Mojo Working" / "Beautiful Dreamer"	1964 'She said Yeah'/ 'Doctor Feelgood' / 'You Make Me Happy' / 'Stupidity'
