= Something Else from The Move =

1968 live EP by The Move

Live album / Extended play by the Move
- Released: 21 June 1968
- Recorded: 27 February and 5 May 1968
- Venues: The Marquee Club, London
- Genres: Psychedelia; rockabilly; pub rock
- Length: 16:26
- Label: Regal Zonophone
- Producer: Denny Cordell

The Move chronology
Move (1968)	Something Else from The Move (1968)	Shazam (1970)

Something Else from the Move is a five-track live EP by the English pop band the Move, released on 21 June 1968 through Regal Zonophone. The Move established themselves with a series of singles that reached the top-five in the UK singles chart, generating hype for an album. After rumours about a live LP began circulating, the Move's manager Tony Secunda pitched an idea about recording an EP of live performances at the Marquee Club in central London. The recordings were taped by producer Denny Cordell at two separate performances in February and May 1968. Technical difficulties forced the band to re-record certain aspects of their performance.

Reflecting the Move's setlist on stage, Something Else from the Move is exclusively made up of covers of songs by contemporary pop bands such as Love and 1950s singers such as Eddie Cochran. The EP has an eclectic blend between rockabilly and psychedelic music. Upon original release in June 1968, the EP was advertised as a "Mini-LP" as it was played at 33 ⅓ RPM. It was the first release by the Move that failed to chart in the UK, leading to speculation regarding the band's decreasing popularity, although the EP received primarily positive reviews, and the Move would still be decently successful, with 3 top 10 charting singles after the EP's release, including a number one single. The EP has been reissued twice, in 1999 and 2016, with added bonus tracks as extra content.

== Background and recording ==
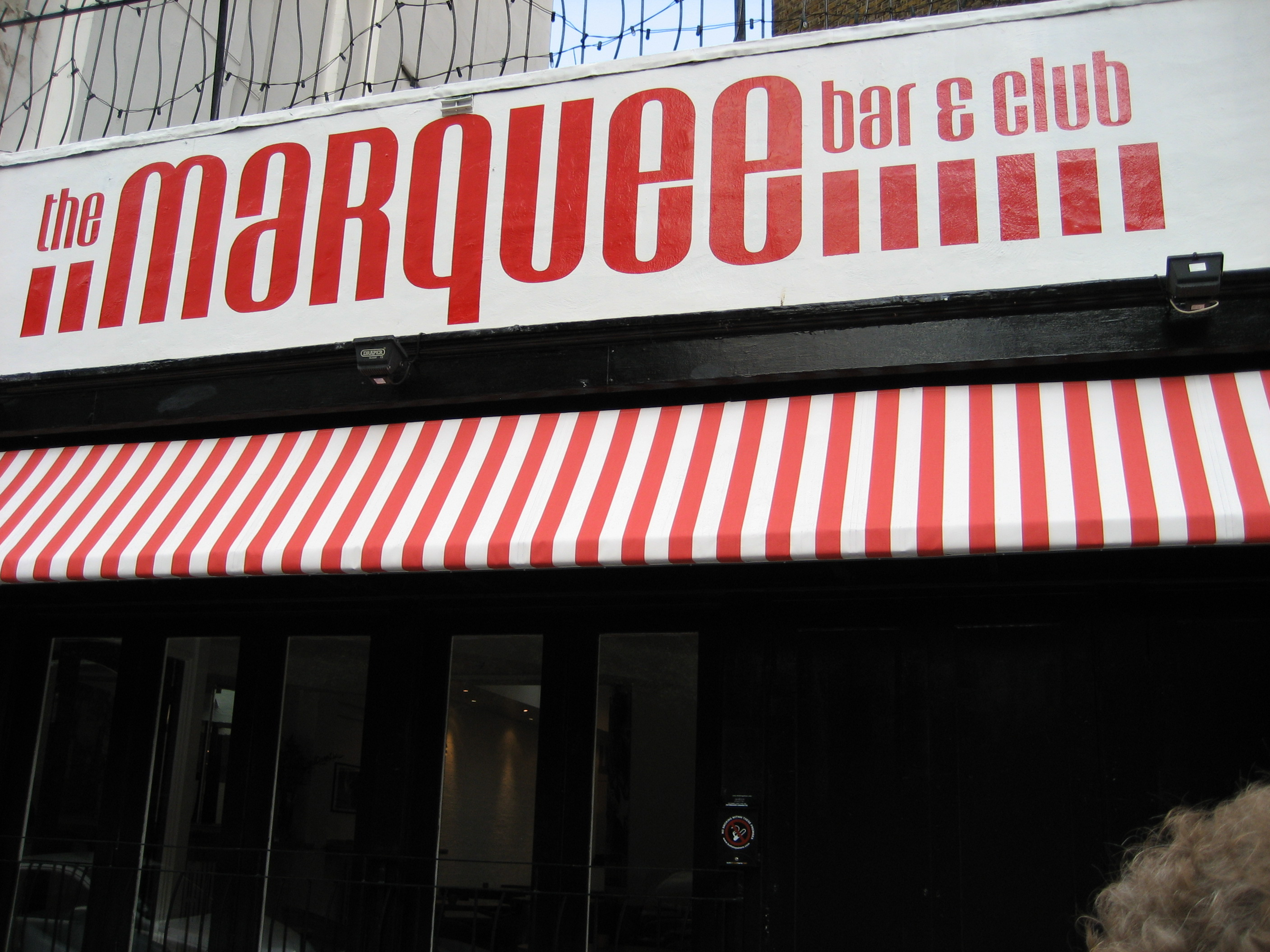
Something Else from the Move was recorded at the Marquee Club in London.

By January 1968, the Move had scored three consecutive top-5 singles with "Night of Fear" (1966), I Can Hear the Grass Grow" and Flowers in the Rain" (both 1967), whilst a fourth, "Fire Brigade", had just been released, and would later go on to hit the top 10 as well. (Note: "Fire Brigade" would also peak in the top-5 of the UK Singles Chart.) Although they had a string of hit singles, no album by the group had appeared; and following the cancellation of their intended 1967 debut album Move Mass, rumours started spreading that the Move's first album would be a live one, in the same vein as Five Live Yardbirds by the Yardbirds. Although manager Tony Secunda was keen on this idea, once it became clear that the band had recorded enough material for a studio album, he instead began brainstorming Something Else from the Move as an extended play to follow up their debut album Move, which was released on 1 April 1968.

Secunda booked the Move to perform a concert at the Marquee Club in central London on 27 February 1968 specifically to record the tracks meant for the EP. The Marquee Club was chosen specifically because the Move were comfortable performing there; they had held a residency at the club during the summer of 1966. For this task, producer Denny Cordell was employed to tape the performance, which was done by feeding the microphone and amp outputs straight into a four-track tape soundboard. The band's original five-piece lineup recorded 10 songs that day; a Bolero jam, "It'll Be Me", "Too Much In Love", "Flowers In The Rain", "Fire Brigade", "Stephanie Knows Who", the first rendition of "Something Else", "So You Want to Be a Rock 'n' Roll Star", "(Your Love Keeps Lifting Me) Higher and Higher" and "Hey Grandma". According to writer Mark Powell, the atmosphere during this session was "wonderful" due to the enthusiastic reception by the crowd.

During playback of the tape at the Marquee backroom studios, it was revealed that there had been technical difficulties with the vocal tracks for several of the songs recorded that day, including ones that eventually would make it onto the EP. The Move returned to the Marquee in the middle of March to re-record the vocals for a number of tracks, of which three were selected to appear on the EP. Secunda booked the band for yet another performance at the Marquee on 5 May 1968. In between the two performance, inner feuds between members alongside a mental breakdown caused bassist Ace Kefford to quit the band in April. Rather than replace him, rhythm guitarist Trevor Burton switched to bass and the band carried on as a quartet. The tracks recorded on 5 May were "Piece of My Heart", "Sunshine Help Me" alongside a second version of "Something Else".

== Musical content ==
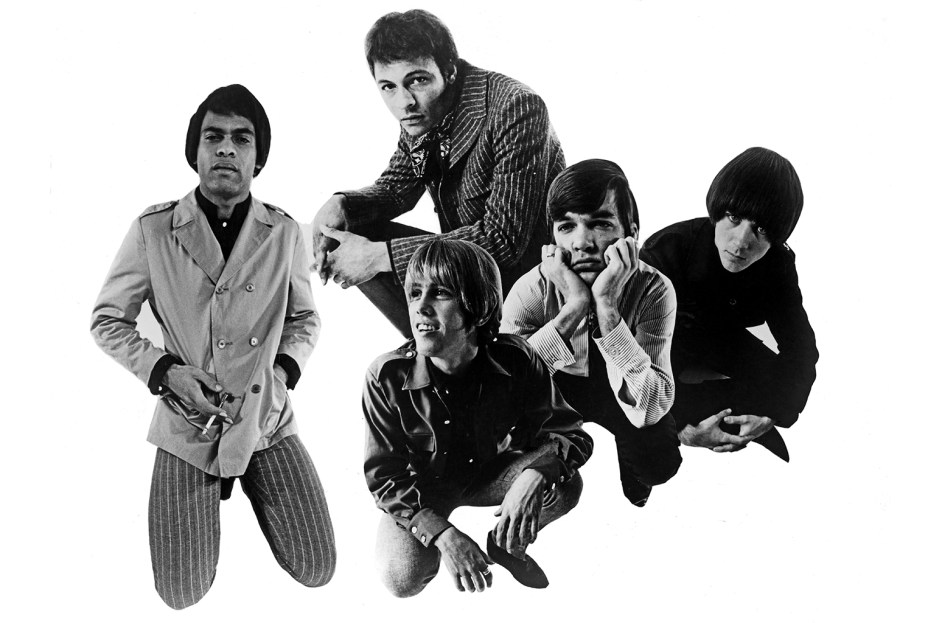
The musical content on Something Else from the Move is entirely made up by covers of contemporary artists, including American rock band Love (pictured here in 1967).

Despite the fact that all of their singles and the majority of their debut album were composed by the Move's lead guitarist Roy Wood, only two of his compositions were recorded live at the Marquee, neither of which would end up on Something Else from the Move. (Note: Those songs being "Flowers In The Rain" and "Fire Brigade".) The rest of the songs were covers from various, largely contemporary artists; none of which adhere to each other genre-wise. The EP's eclectic choice in covers range from rockabilly ("Something Else", "It'll Be Me") to psychedelia ("Stephanie Knows Who"). Cub Koda of AllMusic states that the band's performances throughout the entire EP "are pub rock bash 'n' crash all the way". Unlike the five-part harmonies that both their singles and early live performances were noted for, none of the recordings on the EP feature more than two-part vocal harmonies in the arrangement. Lead vocal duties are split, with vocalist Carl Wayne singing solo on "Stephanie Knows Who" and "It'll Be Me". He shares lead vocals with Wood on "So You Want to Be a Rock 'n' Roll Star" and "Sunshine Help Me", whilst Burton sings lead on the title track.

Side one of Something Else from the Move opens with a brief band introduction by Secunda, before the band launches into a cover of the Byrds' "So You Want to Be a Rock 'n' Roll Star" from 1967. The Move's arrangement of the song largely revolve around Wayne and Wood's split lead vocals, alongside Wood's usage of the wah-wah pedal on his guitar. The band follows this performance with "Stephanie Knows Who", a cover of Love from their 1966 album Da Capo. Writer Tony Robinson believes that the song in particular was an "interesting choice of cover", given the song's irregular waltz time rhythm. As with their cover of the Byrds, Robinson states the Move add a "Black Country-twang" to the recordings. Wood's wah-wah guitar is prominent in the arrangement on it. Side one closes with a "raunchy" cover of Eddie Cochran's rockabilly song "Something Else", which gave the EP its title. Robinson attributes the choice in that cover to the Move returning to their roots of "being hardcore rockers".

Something Else from the Move's second side opens abruptly with the Jerry Lee Lewis song "It'll Be Me", another cover of a rockabilly song. Robinson hypothizes that both "Something Else" and "It'll Be Me" were specifically included on the EP as a nod to the contemporary British rock and roll revival, in which artists and songs from the 1950s saw a resurgence in popularity. (Note: The Move's fourth single "Fire Brigade" was inspired by the revival, with Cochran and Duane Eddy as the primary inspirations.) It is the only song on the EP to feature harmonized backing vocals. Side two's final track is a rendition of Spooky Tooth's debut single "Sunshine Help Me", a cover which Robinson states was performed because the members of both bands were acquainted. James Turner writes that "Sunshine Help Me" is an odd cover in that it is an established and commercially successful band covering a song by a smaller, obscurer band, rather than vice versa. It was intended to be a vehicle to showcase Wood's musical talent on lead guitar. The original recording ran well over 6 minutes, resulting in 90 seconds of the guitar solo being edited out for the EP release.

== Release and reception ==
Something Else from the Move was released as a 7-inch vinyl EP in mono only on 21 June 1968 through Regal Zonophone. (Note: Catalogue number TRZ 2001.) It was both the Move's and Regal Zonophone's first EP release, and in the press it was advertised as a "mini-album", as it was played at 33 ⅓ RPM rather than the standard 45 RPM. It was sold at the same retail price as regular EPs. In addition, a one-sided promotional vinyl single containing "Something Else", complete with a picture sleeve was also distributed around radio disc jockeys at the time. Mark Powell states that the EP proved to be a "fine souvenir" for anybody who was a fan of the Move's live act. Despite being heavily marketed, the EP was the first release by the band to fail to chart in the UK. This, combined with the relatively low charting of their debut album alongside the commercial failure of their fifth single "Wild Tiger Woman" a month later, led to speculation that the band were beginning a decline in appeal amongst British teenagers.The Move's fortunes changed with their sixth single, "Blackberry Way", which was released in November 1968 and became their only number one single in the UK. The band would later have two more top 10 singles, "Brontosaurus" and "California Man".

Professional ratings
Review scores
Source	Rating
AllMusic	3.5/5 stars

In a review for Melody Maker, journalist Chris Welch writes that the EP was part of a plan to "give pop fans value for money" with the tracks capturing the "excited atmosphere of a power-packed Move show". In the Express & Star, the EP is described as "another winner" for the band since the live recordings captures them at their "typical best; full of power and musical talent". In a retrospective review, Cub Coda writes that the disc captures the Move "in full cry going through a brace of their favorite covers", but notes that it acts primarily as a "nice souvenir of how bands truly sounded before PA systems, monitors, and assorted electronic voodoo boxes". He gives the EP three and a half stars. Mark Powell believes that the live recordings are a "marvellous" collection, whilst Tony Robinson calls the EP a "fascinating, vibrant and colorful snapshot" of the era.

As it was a chart failure, Regal Zonophone deleted Something Else from the Move from their catalogue not long after the EP was released, leading to original copies of the disc becoming a collector's item. In addition, the master tapes for the EP went missing, prohibiting a reissue of the disc for three decades until they were located during the 1990s. The EP's first reissue occurred in 1999, when it was remastered from the tapes and released on CD through Edsel Records. This release features the bonus tracks "Piece Of My Heart", "Too Much In Love", "(Your Love Keeps Lifting Me) Higher And Higher" alongside the unedited, full-length version of "Sunshine Help Me". As part of their reissue campaign of the Move's material, Esoteric Recordings released a remastered version of the EP in 2016. This CD saw the first official releases of "Move Bolero", "Flowers In The Rain", "Fire Brigade" and "The Price Of Love", alongside the other tracks released by Edsel.

== Track listing ==
Side One
No.	Title	Writer(s)	Original artist	Length
1.	"So You Want to Be a Rock 'n' Roll Star"	Roger McGuinn; Chris Hillman	The Byrds	2:59
2.	"Stephanie Knows Who"	Arthur Lee	Love	3:02
3.	"Something Else (Note: The song's original title is "Somethin' Else". On the EP sleeve and label, it is referred to as "Something Else".)"	Sharon Sheeley; Bob Cochran	Eddie Cochran	2:25
Total length:				8:26

Side Two
No.	Title	Writer(s)	Original artist	Length
1.	"It'll Be Me"	Jack Clement	Jerry Lee Lewis	2:41
2.	"Sunshine Help Me"	Gary Wright	Spooky Tooth	5:19
Total length:				8:00

== Personnel ==
Personnel according to the liner notes of the 2016 re-issue of Something Else from the Move.

=== The Move ===
- Carl Wayne – lead vocals (2, 4), co-lead vocals (1, 5)
- Roy Wood – lead guitar, co-lead vocals (5), backing vocals (1, 4)
- Trevor Burton – rhythm guitar (1–2, 4), bass guitar (3, 5), lead vocals (3), co-lead vocals (1), backing vocals (4)
- Ace Kefford – bass guitar (1–2, 4), backing vocals (4)
- Bev Bevan – drums

=== Production ===
- Denny Cordell – producer
- Tony Visconti – producer
- Glyn Johns – engineer
- Malcolm Toft – engineer
- Brian Humphries – engineer
