= Cherry Blossom Clinic =

Song by The Move

Song by The Move

from the album Move
- Released: April 1968
- Recorded: 1 November 1967
- Studio: Advision Studios, London
- Genre: Psychedelic pop
- Length: 2:35
- Label: Regal Zonophone
- Songwriter: Roy Wood
- Producers: The Move; Denny Cordell

"Cherry Blossom Clinic" is a song by British rock band The Move, written by their lead guitarist, vocalist, and primary songwriter Roy Wood, intended as the follow-up single to their hit "Flowers in the Rain", which reached number two in the Record Retailer chart. Like many of Wood's other songs, "Cherry Blossom Clinic" deals with clinical insanity and loneliness, and makes several pop culture references throughout, which he largely credits to an ambition for writing a children's book. The track was initially recorded in August 1967 at Advision Studios, but was abandoned for three months before being re-recorded in November of that year, and lacks a production credit.

Featuring a baroque arrangement by Tony Visconti, the song, coupled with "Vote For Me", was scheduled to be released as the group's fourth single, an idea that was primarily shelved due to a controversy involving a lawsuit from United Kingdom's prime minister Harold Wilson regarding a publicity stunt for "Flowers In The Rain". Though the matter was eventually settled through royalties going to charities of Wilson's choice, the band became unnerved and felt that the political satire "Vote For Me" would not go down well in the political climate at that time, leading to the single being shelved and replaced by "Fire Brigade", with "Cherry Blossom Clinic" appearing on the group's April 1968 debut album Move. The single was however released as the B-side to the Japan-exclusive single "The Girl Outside".

In 1969, following several line-up changes, the Move re-recorded "Cherry Blossom Clinic" under the title "Cherry Blossom Clinic Revisited". This version, featuring a more progressive arrangement, lacked the string and brass ensemble found on the original, and was released on the group's second album Shazam in February 1970.

== Background and recording ==
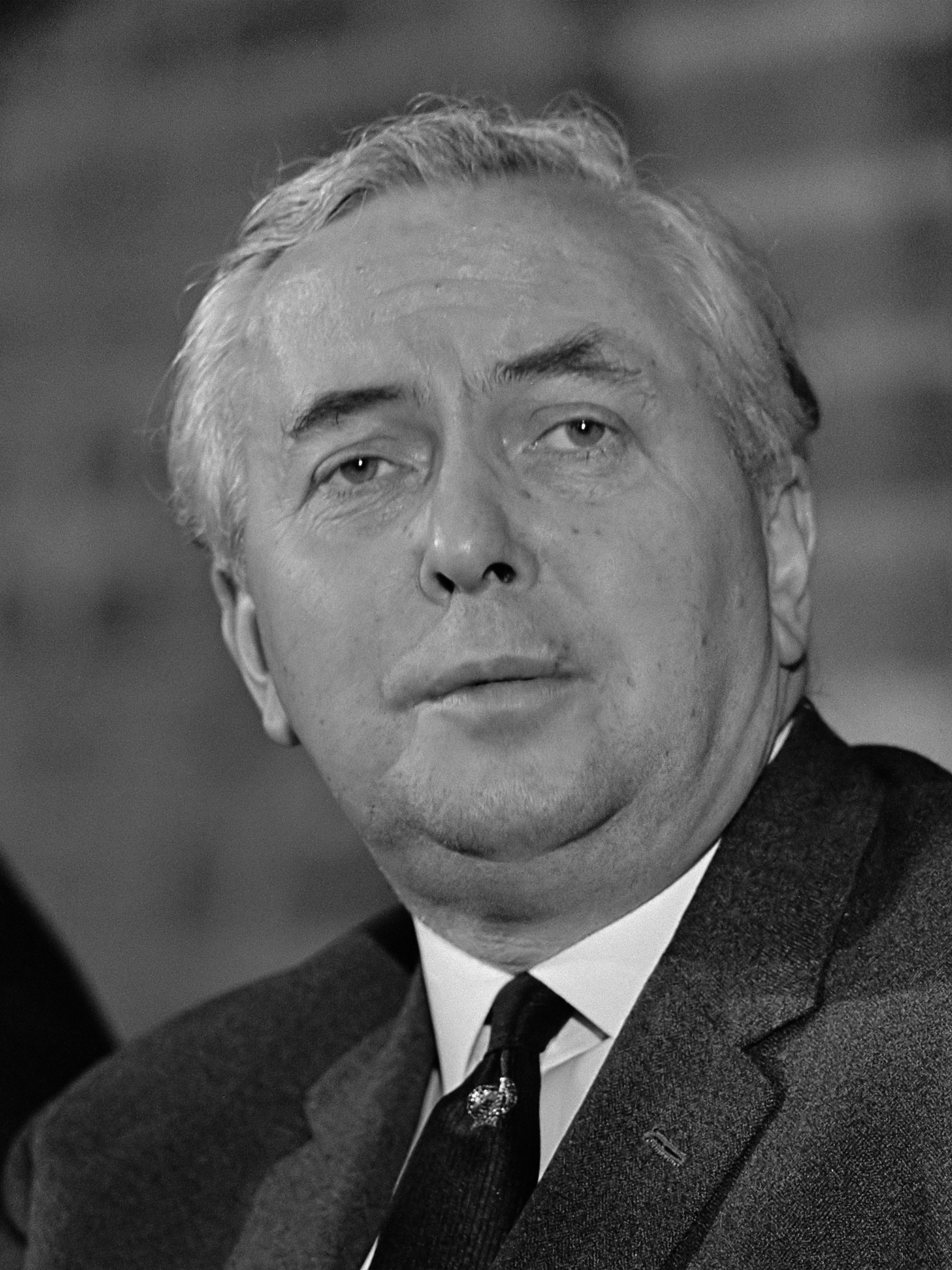
The Move got into controversy when an ad for their single "Flowers in the Rain" depicted UK Prime Minister Harold Wilson (pictured circa-1967) sleeping with his secretary, Marcia Williams.

On 25 August 1967, the Move released their third single, the flower power song "Flowers in the Rain", which was an immediate hit, reaching number two in the UK Singles Chart, and number four in the Irish Singles Chart in October of that year. However, the Move's manager at the time, Tony Secunda, decided to pull yet another publicity stunt in order to promote the band, something he had done multiple times before. This included releasing a postcard depicting the at the time Prime Minister of the United Kingdom, Labour Party leader Harold Wilson in bed with his secretary Marcia Falkender, Baroness Falkender. Wilson sued, and as a result all further royalties from "Flowers in the Rain" were directed to a charity of Wilson's liking, an arrangement which is still enforced to this day. It's been estimated that Wood has lost approximately £200,000 in royalties for the song.

In style with many other releases by the Move, it revolves around the thematic concept of madness and loneliness. It was among the earlier songs that Wood composed, where he admitted that it was based on a psychiatric hospital, albeit a better one. He has also stated that it was an ambition of his to write a children's book with twists in order to appeal to an adult audience. The song tells the story of a man slipping into madness and what he imagines as he hallucinates in his clinic room, but also his awareness of the isolation. It alludes to the mistreatment of mentally ill in psychiatric hospitals, especially in the first verse where it is revealed that the narrator is restrained to his bed. Keeping with the theme of madness, a line in the song about a "teatray in the sky" is a reference from Lewis Carroll's Alice in Wonderland.

The song was first attempted by the Move, when they entered Advision Studios on 25 August 1967 to record it and "Vote For Me", another composition by Wood. While they were satisfied with "Vote For Me", their rendition of "Cherry Blossom Clinic" which was recorded that day did not live up to their standard, and it was subsequently discarded. The group would not touch upon the composition for another three months, before once again entering Advision on 1 November 1967 in order to re-record the track. It was one of the only tracks recorded by the band to share a production credit; it was produced by both the band and their standard producer Denny Cordell. The song features a string and brass arrangement by assistant producer Tony Visconti. While the master tapes of the songs exists, the tape containing the horn section is missing, something later confirmed by Rob Caiger, who remastered the album in 2007.

== Release ==
The band had envisioned "Cherry Blossom Clinic" as a follow-up single to "Flowers in the Rain", with "Vote For Me" acting as its B-side for release in November 1967. However, "Vote For Me", a satirical song which makes fun of corrupt politicians, alluded too much to their legal troubles with Wilson. Scared by the possibly controversial song, and its potential legal consequences, both Regal Zonophone Records and the Move felt that it was unwise to release the single, which was discarded before even getting a catalogue number. Instead, the Move returned to the studio in December to record "Fire Brigade" which would substitute the release of "Cherry Blossom Clinic". However, bassist Ace Kefford made a contrasting statement, saying that "Cherry Blossom Clinic" was cancelled due to Roy Wood coming up with "Fire Brigade", which the band thought was superior. "Fire Brigade " was released as a single in January 1968, backed by "Walk Upon the Water", and reached number three in the UK chart, becoming their fourth top-five single. "Cherry Blossom Clinic" on the other hand, was vaulted until it was eventually released as the final track of the group's debut album, Move in April 1968. The song eventually gained a single release, albeit, only in Japan, as the B-side to the album track "The Girl Outside".

The song generally received positive reviews upon release. In a review for Move in Melody Maker, Bob Dawbarn wrote that "Cherry Blossom Clinic" is the "extreme climax" to the album, positively noting the string arrangement on the track. In his review for the song, AllMusic critic Richie Unterberger called it a highlight of the album, noting the lyrical associations with madness, along with the tuneful verses.

== Cherry Blossom Clinic Revisited ==
"Cherry Blossom Clinic Revisited"

Song by The Move

from the album Shazam
- Released: February 27, 1970
- Recorded: 1969
- Studio: Advision Studios, London
- Genre: Hard rock
- Length: 8:40
- Label: Regal Zonophone
- Songwriter: Wood
- Producers: The Move; Gerald Chevin

The Move revisited "Cherry Blossom Clinic" while recording their second studio album, Shazam, in 1969. This version was recorded with a different lineup to that of the original song, since both bassist Ace Kefford and rhythm guitarist Trevor Burton had either quit the band or were let go. Although Jeff Lynne was considered to be hired by the band, he turned down the offer because of his hectic schedule with his own band, The Idle Race. Instead, Rick Price was hired as a bassist, while all guitar parts were played by Wood. Like the original "Cherry Blossom Clinic", it was recorded at Advision Studios in London.

This version has a spoken introduction by drummer Bev Bevan, in which he, assisted by Roy Wood on acoustic guitar, quotes an alternative version of the original opening lyrics. This rendition is notably less psychedelic, and more progressive. The wah-wah guitar is less noticeable, and the string and brass arrangements are both missing. The song continues Wood's usage of musical quotation, which he started in 1966 with the single "Night of Fear". On Shazam the song is followed by a medley of J. S. Bach's "Jesu, Joy of Man's Desiring", Paul Dukas' The Sorcerer's Apprentice and Tchaikovsky's "Thé" (the Chinese dance) from his ballet The Nutcracker; since these works were all in the public domain, this medley is listed as part of "Cherry Blossom Clinic Revisited" without acknowledging the real works or their composers.

The song was first issued in February 1970, when it was included on side one of the Move's second studio album Shazam. The album, while not commercially successful, received critical acclaim. In his review for Shazam, AllMusic critic stated that "Cherry Blossom Clinic Revisited" is similar to the three songs on Side B of the album. Something Else! wrote that the musical quotation, along with the harder sound than the original leads to it becoming a "class-A classical rock orgy." Rolling Stone critic John Mendelsohn wrote that "Cherry Blossom Clinic" was an adaptation of another song about mental hospital confinement, which has "orgasmic choruses".

== Personnel ==
The Move

- Carl Wayne – backing vocals, percussion
- Roy Wood – lead guitar, co-lead vocals
- Trevor Burton – rhythm guitar, co-lead vocals
- Ace Kefford – bass, backing vocals
- Bev Bevan – drums, backing vocals

Additional musicians

- Tony Visconti - orchestral arrangements
- Denny Cordell - producer
