= Move (The Move album) =

Studio album by the Move
- Released: 22 March 1968
- Recorded: January 1967 − 4 February 1968
- Studios: Advision, De Lane Lea and Olympic (London)
- Genres: Art pop; rock and roll; psychedelic pop; garage rock
- Length: 35:42
- Label: Regal Zonophone
- Producer: Denny Cordell

The Move chronology
Move (1968)	Something Else from The Move (1968)

Singles from Move
- 1. "Flowers in the Rain" Released: 25 August 1967; 2. "Fire Brigade" Released: 26 January 1968

Move is the debut album by the English rock group the Move. Released on 22 March 1968 through Regal Zonophone Records, the album features ten Roy Wood compositions, along with three covers which had been a prominent part of the group's live act. Although scheduled for an earlier release, the album was delayed by the theft of the master tapes, which led to the tracks needing to be re-mixed. The album was sporadically recorded between January 1967 and February 1968 at Advision, De Lane Lea and Olympic Studios in London, during gaps in their tight recording schedule when the group were not booked for any performances.

Highly anticipated, the album featured two previously released singles: "Flowers in the Rain" and "Fire Brigade", both of which reached the top five in the UK Singles Chart. "Cherry Blossom Clinic" would have also been released as a single, but the release was withdrawn. Still, two other singles from the album were released outside of the UK, those being the US-exclusive single "Yellow Rainbow" and the Japan-exclusive single "The Girl Outside", which had "Cherry Blossom Clinic" on its B-side. Move was the only album by the band to chart in the UK, reaching number 15 on the UK Albums Charts midway through that year.

Move was also the only album by the group to feature their original bassist Chris "Ace" Kefford, who left the band shortly after the record was released in early 1968, as well as being the only one to fully feature rhythm guitarist Trevor Burton, who left during the early sessions for their follow-up record Shazam, although Kefford returned for a one-off reunion concert in 1981, and Burton returned to the band (then-renamed to the "Bev Bevan Band") in 2004 as an occasional member, before becoming a full member once again in 2007.

== Background ==
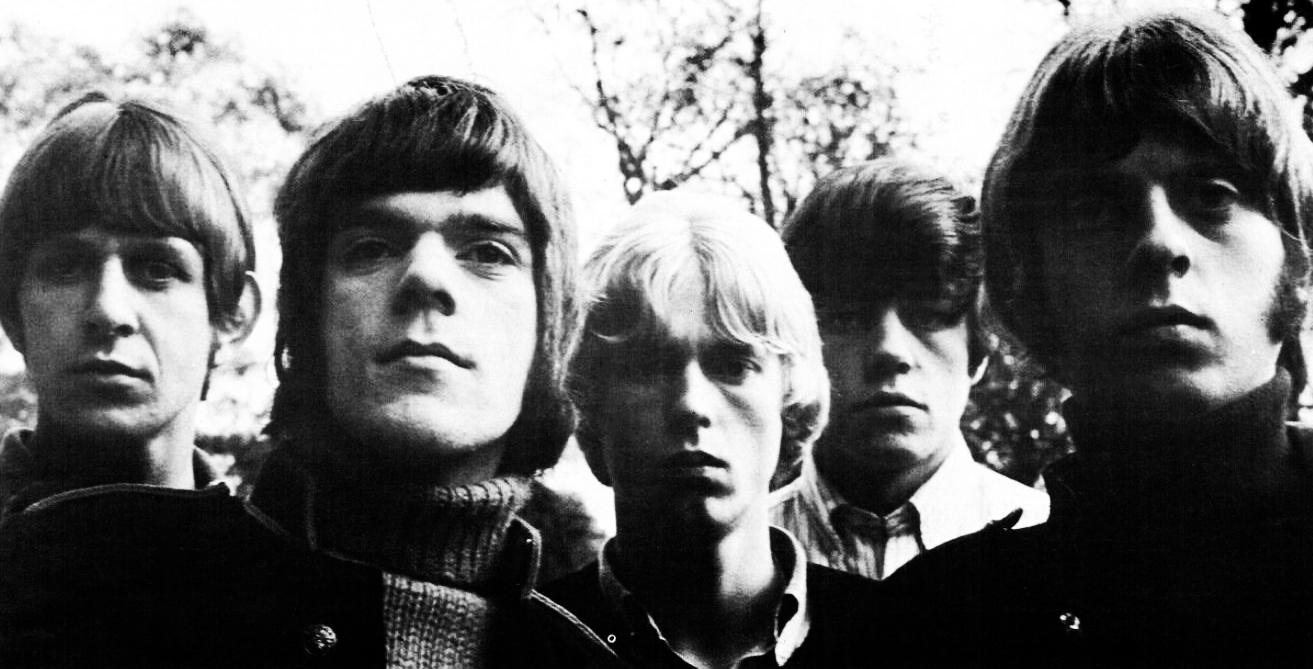
The Move in 1967: (left to right) Carl Wayne, Roy Wood, Ace Kefford, Bev Bevan, Trevor Burton

The Move became a highly publicised band, signing to Deram Records in late 1966, and then released their debut single "Night of Fear" on 9 December 1966. This became their first chart hit, reaching number two in the UK Singles Chart. A band fanclub newsletter released during Christmas stated that they were set to release their debut album by February 1967, with a suggested title of Move Mass by their manager Tony Secunda. However, Secunda decided during the last second that this release would be cancelled, and instead asked the band to continue to perform publicity stunts which should put the band in the newspapers. A follow-up to "Night of Fear" came almost four months later, when "I Can Hear the Grass Grow" was released, reaching number five on the chart.

The group hoped to release the album by autumn 1967; however, in April of that year, New Musical Express announced that the Move offered a £200 reward (equivalent to £3,200 in 2025) to an individual who could potentially return the master tapes back to them. These master tapes, containing ten songs, were stolen from a car which was parked on Denmark Street in the West End of London. They were later discarded by the thief, and were eventually found in a rubbish bin. The tapes were damaged beyond repair or use, and a new mix had to be performed by the engineers, further delaying the release date of the album by several months. Producer Denny Cordell also managed to switch the band from Deram over to Regal Zonophone Records.

During autumn 1967, the Move released another successful single in Britain, "Flowers in the Rain". It charted at number two. This had the honour of becoming the first full record to be played on the newly launched BBC Radio 1, further adding to their popularity. However, keeping up with this newfound popularity became hard, and the group had a tight performance schedule. Chris "Ace" Kefford was quoted saying "The pressure of being in the charts and having your clothes ripped and hair pulled out by fans in the streets - I had scissors stuck in my eye - but for the same money I got in The Vikings."

Tying in with "Flowers in the Rain", Secunda performed another publicity stunt, by printing postcards depicting Harold Wilson (at the time prime minister and Labour Party leader) in bed with his secretary Marcia Falkender, Baroness Falkender. This prompted Wilson to sue the group, leading to all royalties going to a charity of Wilson's liking, to the loss of the song's composer Roy Wood. The scheduled follow up to "Flowers in the Rain" was "Cherry Blossom Clinic", which was backed by "Vote For Me", a satirical piece regarding corrupt politicians. This idea was shelved due to the court proceedings, as both the band and Regal Zonophone believed that it was unwise to release the potentially controversial song.

== Recording ==
=== Early sessions ===
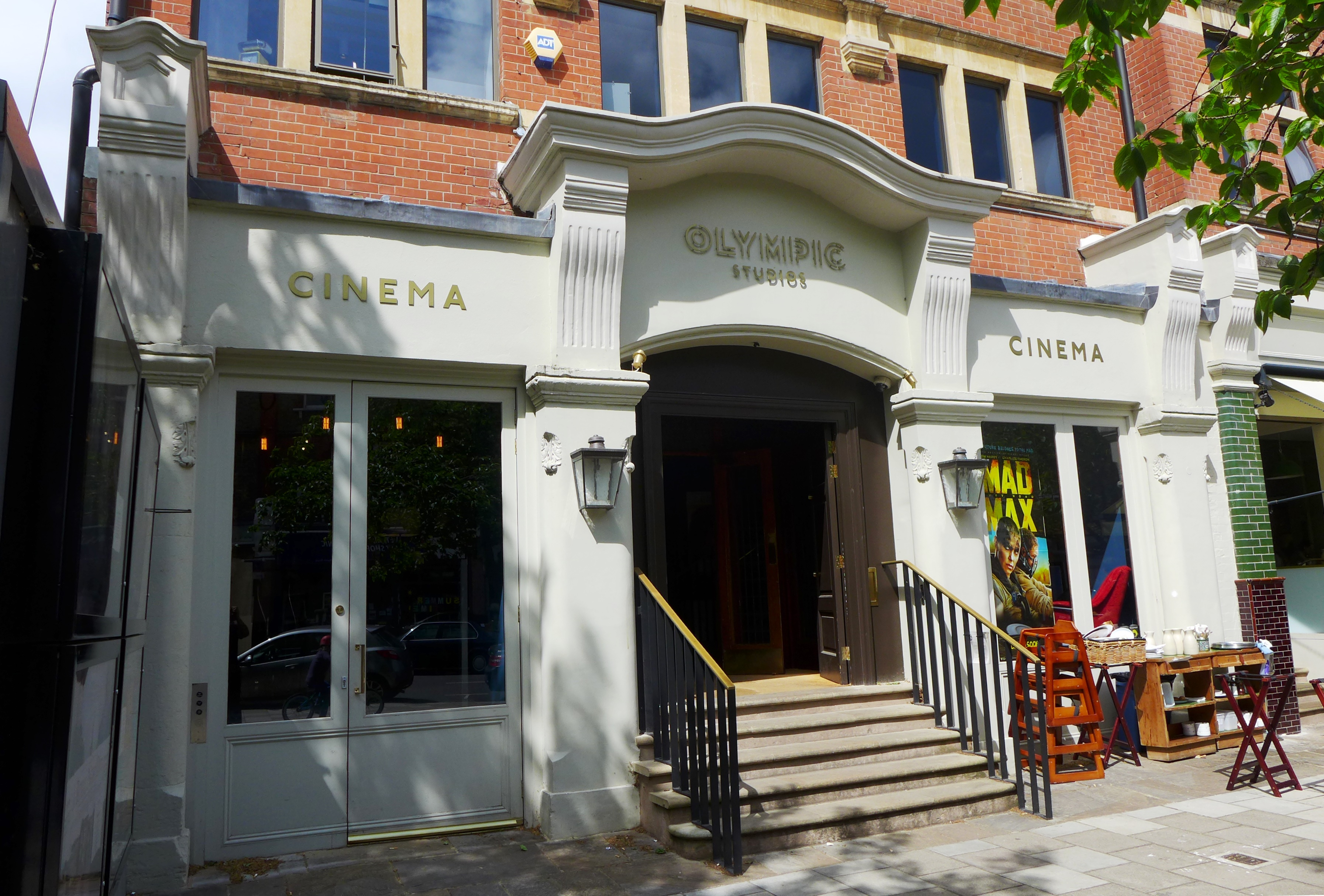
The recording of Move marked the first time the band utilized Olympic Studios, Barnes, London.

The first track recorded by the Move intended for an album release was a Wood composition, "Walk Upon the Water" which was taped in January 1967 at Advision Studios, London. During presumably the same session, an additional two tracks were recorded: "Move Intro" and "Move" which acted as an unofficial theme song for the band. These tracks, however, were not featured on the final album. These were not the first attempts by the Move to record potential album or single tracks. A year earlier, they recorded "You're the One I Need", was recorded at Ladbroke Sound studios. This song was also shelved, but gave Secunda an idea of how Wood composed songs, later stating "Roy showed me some poetry he'd written. I said 'You can do it! You can start writing'".

The band then toured for several weeks, but they returned to Advision in March, and on the 23rd they taped three songs: the two Wood originals "Kilroy Was Here" and "(Here We Go Round) the Lemon Tree" and an Eddie Cochran track, "Weekend", which was the first cover to get recorded for the album. Their second single "I Can Hear the Grass Grow" was released the following week, on 31 March. The 23 March recording sessions was the last before the master tapes were stolen from their agent's car on Denmark Street. The group then quit recording altogether for an additional four months, continuing their performance schedule. The band performed on the West German television show Beat! Beat! Beat! on 26 June 1967.

=== Later sessions ===
To be perfectly honest, I used to get on well with Denny [Cordell] but I never thought he was a very good producer. He relied very heavily on the engineer.

— Roy Wood

The band returned to Advision on 6 July to record a new Wood composition, "Flowers in the Rain", the only track recorded during this session. The next sessions occurred in August, when the group recorded "Cherry Blossom Clinic" along with "Vote For Me" at Advision on 25 August. However, the group was not satisfied with their arrangement of "Cherry Blossom Clinic", and it was discarded. After appearing on BBC's radio show Easy Beat performing "Morning Dew", "Stephanie Knows Who", "Flowers in the Rain" and "So You Want to Be a Rock 'n' Roll Star" in September 1967, the group for the first time entered Olympic Studios, with Glyn Johns engineering, to record "Yellow Rainbow" the following month. This was due to the fact that Olympic had better equipment compared to Advision studios, who did not install an 8-track tape device until 1968.

"Cherry Blossom Clinic" was once again revisited on 1 November, with a string and horn arrangement. During this session, they also recorded an alternative version of "Vote For Me" which was later discarded. "Fire Brigade" and "The Girl Outside" were also first attempted at Olympic on 16 November of that year, but were not finalized. The group returned to Olympic the following month, and on 19 December they recorded "Mist on a Monday Morning". Four days later, they finalized both "Fire Brigade" and "The Girl Outside" at De Lane Lea Studios. The final session for the album was held on 4 February 1968, where "Useless Information" and "Zing! Went the Strings of My Heart" were both recorded at Advision. It is unclear on which date "Hey Grandma" was recorded, but it is thought to be in 1967.

== Musical content ==
"Cherry Blossom Clinic" was about a nuthouse, basically, but a nice one. That was one of my early songs. When I left art-school it was one of my ambitions to write a children's book for adults – fairy stories with strange twists in them. I had a lot of ideas written down and I used them in my songs.

— Roy Wood, in Clinton Heylin, All the Madmen: Barrett, Bowie, Drake, the Floyd, The Kinks, The Who and the Journey to the Dark Side of English Rock

The musical style and direction greatly varies. Most songs from the earlier sessions could be classified as psychedelic pop, most notably "Walk Upon the Water" which acts as an anti drink-driving song, with somewhat dark lyrics over an upbeat melody. Wood had in fact written it to be a single, but the record label decided against using it for that purpose. However, other songs, such as "Kilroy Was Here" (which references the World War II phenomenon Kilroy was here) could be classified as a combo of psychedelic pop and folk rock. The album also makes attempts at Baroque pop on both "The Girl Outside" and "Mist on A Monday Morning", the latter of which was Wood's first attempt at writing something like the Beatles "Eleanor Rigby". The two most psychedelic tracks on the album are the opening song "Yellow Rainbow", which heavily features reverb on both the guitars and drums, along with "Cherry Blossom Clinic" which features prevalent use of a Wah-wah pedal.

The three covers which are present are also vastly different from one another, and do not seem to share characteristics. "Weekend", written by Bill and Doree Post was originally recorded by Eddie Cochran in 1959, and largely revolves around the genres of rock and roll and rockabilly, which originated from that era. "Hey Grandma", written by Jerry Miller and Don Stevenson was first recorded by American psychedelic rock band Moby Grape and initially appeared as the opening track to their eponymous debut album on 6 June 1967. The third and final cover was "Zing! Went the Strings of My Heart" written by James F. Hanley in 1934. However, their rendition of the Broadway song was derived from a later cover by the Coasters, which introduced tempo changes, and a four part harmony by them, including two falsetto vocals.

Lyrically, the album is very eclectic, deriving inspiration from various sources, but in style with Wood's earlier songwriting and compositions, many songs revolve around the mental state of the narrator. "Cherry Blossom Clinic" and "Walk Upon the Water" both revolve around the declining mental state of the narrator, with "Walk Upon the Water" alluding to the narrator's friends drowning, while "Cherry Blossom Clinic" describes the further mental decline of a psychiatric hospital patient. Other themes includes loneliness, displayed on "(Here We Go Round) The Lemon Tree", "Flowers in the Rain" and "Mist on a Monday Morning", all of which portray loneliness in vastly different ways, including sorrow, sadness and peace of mind.

Unlike the Move's singles, singer Carl Wayne's duty is minimized, singing only lead vocals on "Walk Upon the Water", "Flowers in the Rain" and "Useless Information". He does, however sing harmony vocals on "Hey Grandma" and "Fire Brigade". Rhythm guitarist Trevor Burton has had his role as a lead singer expanded, and he sings lead on "Weekend" and "The Girl Outside", while also contributing harmony vocals on "Kilroy Was Here", "(Here We Go Round) the Lemon Tree", "Walk Upon the Water", and "Cherry Blossom Clinic". Wood's role has also been maximized, singing lead on "Mist on a Monday Morning", while contributing harmony vocals to virtually every other track present. Although heavily present as a singer during live performances, bassist Ace Kefford's role as a singer is confined to two songs, "Yellow Rainbow" (sung with the song's author Wood), and "Zing! Went the Strings of My Heart", which he sings with drummer Bev Bevan, in one of only two lead vocals the latter sang with the Move.

== Release and reception ==
=== Release ===
The final master track of the album was compiled by Denny Cordell and engineer Dave Hadfield on 20 February 1968 at Maximum Sound Studios. The final master tape was produced on 7 March 1968 by engineer Ron Pender at EMI Studios, London. Four tracks were released from the album as singles along with their respective B-sides. These were "Flowers in the Rain" along with "(Here We Go Round) the Lemon Tree", which was first released on 25 August 1967, and reached number two on the British charts. The second single was "Fire Brigade", backed by "Walk Upon the Water", which was released on 26 January 1968 and reached number three. The intended release of "Cherry Blossom Clinic" was eventually cancelled and the song was instead to appear on the album, with the B-side "Vote For Me" being discluded, and first appeared on compilation albums throughout the 1990s.

With a psychedelic album cover design by the collective The Fool (who previously worked together with the Beatles), Move was first issued in March 1968 by Regal Zonophone with the catalogue number of LRZ 100. Largely fueled by the success of recent singles, Move first reached the UK charts on 13 April 1968, at a position of 26. The following week, it reached its peak of 15, before ascending to 16 on 27 April. The following week, it was once again back at number 15 and by 11 May it started dropping off the chart, at a position of 17. On 18 May it was at number 30, before climbing to number 34 the following week. On 1 June, it was at number 40, a position it held for two weeks, before it dropped off the chart. In total, the album spent 9 weeks on the chart, of which 4 were in the top-20 and 6 in the top-30.

Move became the only album by the group to chart. The album was the only one to feature bassist Ace Kefford, who, due to a mental breakdown caused by heavy usage of LSD, left the group shortly after their package tour with Jimi Hendrix Experience, but also after an appearance on Top of the Pops where the group performed "Fire Brigade". He later regretted doing drugs, stating "Me and Trev [Burton] did loads of acid... it screwed up my life man. Devastated me completely." Upon his departure, he attempted to record a solo album which ultimately failed, and eventually formed his own band, The Ace Kefford Stand, who released one single in 1969 before breaking up. Following Kefford's departure, Burton switched to bass before leaving himself in 1969, and was replaced by Rick Price.

=== Reception ===
Professional ratings
Review scores
Source	Rating
AllMusic	4.5/5 stars
Encyclopedia of Popular Music	5/5 stars

Upon release, the album received primarily positive reviews. Bob Dawbarn of Melody Maker thought that there was not "one poor track" on it, positively noting the inclusion of the singles "Flowers in the Rain" and "Fire Brigade", and stated that it "should make everybody concerned very happy." It was ranked Melody Maker's top album of the month.

In a retrospective review of the album, Stephen Thomas Erlewine of AllMusic states that the album sounds like the work of multiple musical ensembles, due to the fact that the songs all feature different lead vocalists. He states that with Move, they combined Pete Townshend-esque art rock with older rockabilly three-chord song, but that they were doing so in order not to fit in with any particular musical category, a fate which happened to multiple artists, including the Who and the Small Faces. He writes that they were almost as heavy as the Who at the time, but were at the same time more psychedelic than Them or the Kinks. He writes that the album is a combination of contrasting genres which tend to "ping-pong" back and forth.

== Track listing ==
All songs written by Roy Wood, except where noted.

Side one
No.	Title	Writer(s)	Lead vocals	Length
1.	"Yellow Rainbow"		Ace Kefford with Roy Wood	2:35
2.	"Kilroy Was Here"		Roy Wood with Trevor Burton	2:43
3.	"(Here We Go Round) The Lemon Tree"		Wood	2:59
4.	"Weekend"	Bill Post; Doree Post	Burton	1:46
5.	"Walk Upon the Water"		Carl Wayne with Wood and Burton	3:22
6.	"Flowers in the Rain"		Wayne with Wood	2:29
7.	"Hey Grandma"	Jerry Miller; Don Stevenson	Wayne and Burton	3:11

Side two
No.	Title	Writer(s)	Lead vocals	Length
8.	"Useless Information"		Wayne and Wood	2:56
9.	"Zing! Went the Strings of My Heart"	James F. Hanley	Bev Bevan and Kefford	2:49
10.	"The Girl Outside"		Burton	2:53
11.	"Fire Brigade"		Wood with Wayne	2:22
12.	"Mist on a Monday Morning"		Wood	2:30
13.	"Cherry Blossom Clinic"		Burton with Wood	2:30

== Reissues ==
After some unofficial releases, Move was reissued on CD, by Cube, with additional tracks, in 1994. It was reissued in a deluxe, two-disc package in 2007 by Salvo. More re-issues arrived in April 2016 from Esoteric Records, a label of Cherry Red Records: a 3CD remastered and expanded deluxe edition (Catalog ID: ECLEC32536) and a remastered and expanded edition (Catalog ID: ECLEC2537). According to Esoteric, these newly re-mastered editions focus on the mono mix of the album. The single CD version includes five bonus tracks (none of them previously unreleased), and the 3-CD set includes 52 bonus tracks (five of them previously unreleased).

=== Track listing ===
All songs written by Roy Wood unless noted.

Bonus tracks (2007 reissue)
No.	Title	Lead vocals	Length
14.	"Vote for Me"	Burton with Wood	2:48
15.	"Disturbance"	Wayne and Wood with Kefford	2:48
16.	"Night of Fear"	Wayne with Kefford	2:14
17.	"Wave the Flag and Stop the Train"	Wayne with Wood	2:56
18.	"I Can Hear the Grass Grow"	Wayne with Wood and Kefford	3:05

Disc 2 – New Movement (previously unreleased stereo)
No.	Title	Writer(s)	Lead vocals	Length
1.	"Move Intro"		Wayne, Wood, Burton, Kefford and Bevan	0:25
2.	"Move"		Wayne	2:02
3.	"Cherry Blossom Clinic"		Burton with Wood	2:41
4.	"Fire Brigade"		Wood with Wayne	2:20
5.	"Kilroy Was Here"		Wood with Burton	2:43
6.	"(Here We Go Round) The Lemon Tree"		Wood	3:17
7.	"Weekend"	Bill Post; Doree Post	Burton	1:55
8.	"Zing! Went the Strings of My Heart"	James F. Hanley	Bevan and Kefford	2:46
9.	"Don't Throw Stones at Me"		Kefford	2:41
10.	"Mist on a Monday Morning"		Wood	2:28
11.	"Vote for Me" (alternate version)		Burton with Wood	2:49
12.	"Night of Fear"		Wayne with Kefford	2:21
13.	"The Girl Outside" (alternate take)		Burton	2:53
14.	"Walk Upon the Water"		Wayne with Wood and Burton	3:22
15.	"Useless Information"		Wayne and Wood	2:55
16.	"Flowers in the Rain"		Wayne with Wood	2:41

== Personnel ==
=== The Move ===
- Carl Wayne – vocals
- Roy Wood – guitars, vocals
- Trevor Burton – guitars, vocals
- Ace Kefford – bass, vocals
- Bev Bevan – drums, percussion, vocals

=== Additional personnel ===
- Nicky Hopkins – piano (7), harpsichord (12)
- Tony Visconti – string, brass and woodwind arrangements

== Charts ==
=== Album ===
Chart	Year	Peak position
UK Albums Chart	1968	15

=== Singles ===
Year	Song	B-side	Chart positions
Year	Song	B-side	UK Singles Chart
1967	"Flowers in the Rain"	"(Here We Go Round) the Lemon Tree"	2
1968	"Fire Brigade"	"Walk Upon the Water"	3
