= I Can Hear the Grass Grow =

- Belgian release single sleeve

Single by the Move
- B-side: "Wave the Flag and Stop the Train"
- Released: 31 March 1967
- Recorded: 5 January 1967
- Studio: Advision, London
- Genre: Power pop; art pop; psychedelic pop
- Length: 3:05
- Label: Deram
- Songwriter: Roy Wood
- Producer: Denny Cordell

The Move singles chronology
"Night of Fear" (1966)	"I Can Hear the Grass Grow" (1967)	"Flowers in the Rain" (1967)

"I Can Hear the Grass Grow " is the second single by the Move, written by Roy Wood and produced by Denny Cordell. The song was recorded on the 5th of January, 1967 in Advision Studios in London, was first released on 31 March, through Deram Records, with the B-side, "Wave the Flag and Stop the Train". The song would become another hit for the band following their debut, "Night of Fear", making it to number five on the UK Singles Chart on 10 May, staying there for a total of ten weeks.

"I Can Hear the Grass Grow" was the second of a string of four consecutive top-5 singles from the band in the United Kingdom, from 1966 to 1968. The song would later become one of the group's signature tunes, and was covered by acts such as the Blues Magoos (in 1968), Status Quo (in 1996), and The Fall (in 2005). It would later appear on the 2007 reissue of the group's debut, self-titled studio album, Move.

== Background ==
On 9 December 1966, the Move released their debut single "Night of Fear" to great commercial success, reaching number two in the UK singles chart on 26 January 1967. The hints of psychedelia in the song led to rumours about the band using LSD or other hallucinogenic drugs, something that drummer Bev Bevan later denounced. Both rhythm guitarist Trevor Burton and bassist Ace Kefford would later admit to using drugs, the latter of which considered it a grave mistake. The newfound success led to songwriter and lead guitarist Roy Wood to believe in himself as a true songwriter, as "Night of Fear" was only the third or fourth original composition that he had written.

As with many of Wood's early songs, the basis of "I Can Hear the Grass Grow" was a book of fairy tales which Wood authored while at The Moseley College of Art. The title came from photographer Robert Davidson, who had received a letter from an unknown individual that read "I listen to pop music on the radio because where I live it's so bloody quiet that I can hear the grass grow." He told this to Wood, who was inspired enough to write a song regarding the subject. In the April 1967 Beat Instrumental issue, Wood states that the song is about a mentally ill person. Although journalists have presumed the song to be about the synesthetic effects of hallucinogenics, Wood has on multiple occasions refuted that claim, accusing the music press of trying to build an association between pop musicians and drugs, and noting that virtually any song could be misinterpreted as being about drug use by someone looking to make that connection. The group entered Advision Studios in London on 5 January 1967 to record the song, along with what eventually would become the B-side, "Wave the Flag and Stop the Train", with producer Denny Cordell and engineer Gerald Chevin.

== Release and reception ==
By this point, the Move had recorded approximately ten songs which were to appear on their debut album titled Move Mass in early 1967. However, their manager Tony Secunda thought it would be more commercially successful to continue performing publicity stunts in order to gain publicity for the group. "Wave the Flag and Stop the Train" was never intended as the B-side of "I Can Hear the Grass Grow", instead, an eponymous track simply titled "Move" was to take its place. However, during a mixing session on 30 January 1967 problems arose when mixing the song, which led to it being scrapped and being substituted by "Wave the Flag and Stop the Train". Deram Records released "I Can Hear the Grass Grow" on 31 March 1967 in the UK with the catalogue number of DM.117. (Note: The release date of 31 March 1967 is printed on promotional copies of the singles, sent around radio stations prior to the official release) The single was also released in territories such as the United States and Continental Europe.

The single was a success, albeit not as big as "Night of Fear". It entered the UK chart on 12 April 1967 at a position of number 39. The following week, it had climbed to number 30 and by 26 April, it was at number 16. The following week it entered the top-10 for the first time at number seven before reaching its peak on 10 May 1967, where it stayed for one week. Following this, it started descending down the chart, at number nine before exiting the top-10 on 24 May at a position of 13. The following week it was at number 20, and the week after that it had reached number 28. It was last seen on 14 June when it was at a position of 44 before disappearing off the chart. In total, it spent ten weeks on the charts, six of which were in the top-20 and three of which were in the top-10. It also did well in most of Europe and New Zealand.

Matthew Greenwald of AllMusic states that though the lyrics seem a little bit antique, he believes that the "artistic moxie" aged like fine wine. Unlike other songs by the Move, "I Can Hear the Grass Grow" was not dropped from the live set following the departure of Kefford, instead Burton would take over his lead vocals. It was first performed live on 3 August 1967 when they played at the Locarno Ballroom in Derby, Derbyshire. A rendition of the song was included on Live at the Fillmore 1969, which features Rick Price taking over Kefford's vocals, as Burton had left the band at that point.

=== Further releases ===
Although the track was not released on the band's self-titled debut, Move, it was released on the 2007 Salvo reissue of the album as the 18th and final track. It appeared alongside its B-side, "Wave the Flag and Stop the Train", and also appeared alongside the previous single "Night of Fear" and its B-side, "The Disturbance" (just called "Disturbance" on the reissue). The song was also put onto the reissue's second disc, called "New Movement", which provided new stereo mixes of the album's tracks and related tracks from that era.

== Personnel ==
The Move

- Carl Wayne – lead, harmony and backing vocals
- Roy Wood – lead, harmony and backing vocals, lead guitar
- Trevor Burton – harmony and backing vocals, rhythm guitar
- Chris "Ace" Kefford – lead, harmony and backing vocals, bass guitar
- Bev Bevan – harmony (chorus) vocals, drums

Additional personnel

- Denny Cordell – producer

== Charts ==
=== Weekly charts ===
Chart (1967)	Peak position
Belgium (Ultratop 50 Flanders)	18
Belgium (Ultratop 50 Wallonia)	22
Denmark (Salgshitlisterne Top 20)	13
France (SNEP)	69
Netherlands (Dutch Top 40)	22
New Zealand (Listener)	17
Rhodesia (Lyons Maid)	7
UK Singles (Official Charts Company)	5

=== Year-end charts ===
Chart (1967)	Rank
UK Singles (Official Charts Company)	45

=== All-time charts ===
Chart	Rank
Belgium (UltraTop)	5512

== Cover versions ==
- In 1968, Blues Magoos recorded the song for their third studio album, Basic Blues Magoos. Their version was produced by the band themselves, alongside Art Polhemus and Bob Wyld, and was released as both the third and final single to the album in August 1968 (although it did not chart) and the second track on the album itself on 13 May.
- The song was covered in 1996 by the British rock band Status Quo, but this rock version of the song was not released as a single. However, it did appear on their twenty-second studio album, Don't Stop, a cover album which was released on 5 February, 1996. The song was the third track on the album, and was produced by Pip Williams.
- Australian rock band You Am I covered the song for their Trike single, released in July 1997.
- In 2005, The Fall covered the track on their 24th studio album, Fall Heads Roll. The album was released on 3 October 2005, and contained the song as the eighth track. It was previously released as the sole single from the album on 26 September, and their version charted at number 104 on the UK singles chart and number 20 on the UK Independent Singles Chart. The song was the last from the band to make the UK singles chart, with the band later breaking up in 2018.
