= Wild Tiger Woman =

Single by the Move
- B-side: "Omnibus"
- Released: 30 August 1968
- Recorded: 21 March 1968
- Studio: Olympic, London, UK
- Genre: Hard rock
- Length: 2:55
- Label: Regal Zonophone
- Songwriter: Roy Wood
- Producer: Denny Cordell

The Move singles chronology
"Fire Brigade" (1968)	"Wild Tiger Woman" (1968)	"Blackberry Way" (1968)

"Wild Tiger Woman" is a song recorded by the Move, produced by Denny Cordell and, as with all the other A-sides of their singles, written by Roy Wood. It was recorded on 21 March 1968 at Olympic Studios in London, and was issued as their fifth single on 30 August. Despite their previous chart success, the song only charted at number 53 on the UK Singles Chart, despite all of their previous singles having reached the top-5 on that chart. Although the song did not appear on the band's second studio album, Shazam, it did appear as the fourth bonus track on the 2007 reissue of the album, alongside its B-side, "Omnibus".

== Background and recording ==
"Wild Tiger Woman" was much heavier than the band's earlier singles, bearing the influence of Jimi Hendrix, whom the group greatly admired and had often played on the same bill with. Wood and rhythm/bass guitarist Trevor Burton had sung backing vocals on the track "You've Got Me Floating" from The Jimi Hendrix Experience's album Axis: Bold as Love. For the "Wild Tiger Woman" session, musician Nicky Hopkins played piano. According to Wood, producer Denny Cordell was not present for the mixing of the track and so it was handled by the band themselves and the engineer, which he felt resulted in an inferior mix.

According to Burton, "It had the heavier rock'n'roll sound we should have been playing all along, and I really thought it was on its way to the very top." Wood was less enthusiastic: "The song's all right. I wouldn't choose to sing it now."

== Commercial reception ==
Unlike their first four singles, which had all reached the UK top five, it did not even make the Top 40. A factor in this failure to chart may have lay in the lyrics which included the line "tied to the bed, she's waiting to be fed", which led to the single being banned from BBC Radio 1. Another factor was that the single's mono mix was muffled, as compared to prior Move singles. (A recent first-time stereo mix shows that the tune was nicely recorded, just initially poorly mixed).

Its failure was a disappointment to the rest of the group, who conceded that it had been something of a mistake, and that the more melodic B-side, "Omnibus", would have been a more suitable A-side instead. They announced that they would probably disband if their subsequent single did likewise. The song that they chose for it, "Blackberry Way", became a number 1 hit, however, and so the group did not disband until 1972, when they were supplanted by Electric Light Orchestra.

== Personnel ==
The Move

- Carl Wayne – lead, harmony and backing vocals
- Roy Wood – lead, harmony and backing vocals, guitars
- Trevor Burton – lead, harmony and backing vocals, bass guitar
- Bev Bevan – drums, backing vocals

Additional personnel

- Nicky Hopkins – piano
