= Flowers in the Rain =

- Dutch picture sleeve

Single by the Move

from the album Move
- B-side: "(Here We Go Round) the Lemon Tree"
- Released: 25 August 1967
- Recorded: 6 July 1967
- Studio: Advision, London
- Genre: Psychedelic pop; art pop; pop rock
- Length: 2:29 (original version); 2:41 (2007 remastered version)
- Label: Regal Zonophone (UK); A&M (US)
- Songwriter: Roy Wood
- Producer: Denny Cordell

The Move singles chronology
"I Can Hear the Grass Grow" (1967)	"Flowers in the Rain" (1967)	"Fire Brigade" (1968)

Official audio
- "Flowers in the Rain" on YouTube

"Flowers in the Rain" is a song by English rock band the Move. The song was released as the lead single to the band's debut self-titled studio album, Move, on 25 August 1967, featuring the B-side "(Here We Go Round) the Lemon Tree" and released by Regal Zonophone Records in the United Kingdom and A&M Records in the United States. It was later released as the sixth track to the album in March 1968. The single reached number two in 1967 on the UK Singles Chart, and number four in Ireland.

The song was written by the Move's guitarist/vocalist Roy Wood, produced by Denny Cordell, and recorded on 6 July in Advision Studios, based in London. As with many of Wood's early songs, the basis of "Flowers in the Rain" was a book of fairy tales which Wood authored while at The Moseley College of Art. The distinctive instrumental arrangement, including oboe, clarinet, cor anglais, and French horn, was suggested by assistant producer Tony Visconti.

== Release ==
The single was released on 25 August 1967, as the lead single to the band's debut self-titled project, which would be released less than a year later, in March 1968. There, on the album it was placed as the sixth track. As for the single release, it would continue a streak of top 10 singles from the band, preceded by the band's first two singles, "Night of Fear" and "I Can Hear the Grass Grow", and later followed by the second and final single to the band's debut, "Fire Brigade". The song specifically peaked at number two on the UK singles chart, blocked by Engelbert Humperdinck's "The Last Waltz", released that same year. The song would also hit the top 10 in Australia, Ireland, Netherlands, Rhodesia, and New Zealand, the latter being where the song hit the top of the Listener chart. On the 2007 remastered version of the album, the song is 12 seconds longer on the reissue's second disc, called "New Movement".

=== Promotional stunt ===
In a promotional stunt for the record – typical of the band's manager Tony Secunda – a postcard was released with a cartoon of a naked then-Prime Minister Harold Wilson in bed with his secretary Marcia Williams. Wilson sued, and the High Court ordered that all royalties from the song be donated to a charity of Wilson's choice. This arrangement, which remains in force, saw royalties go to the Spastics Society and Stoke Mandeville Hospital during the period of the single's chart success. In the 1990s, The Observer newspaper reported the royalties had exceeded £200,000 and that the Harold Wilson Charitable Trust had extended the range of beneficiaries to include, among others, the Oxford Operatic Society, Bolton Lads Club, and the Jewish National Fund for Israel.

== Legacy ==
"Flowers in the Rain" achieved its own place in pop history by being the first record to be played on BBC Radio 1 when the station was launched on 30 September 1967. (Technically, both George Martin's specially commissioned "Theme One" and John Dankworth's "Beefeaters" were the first tracks to be heard on the station. "Beefeaters" was Tony Blackburn's theme tune for Daily Disc Delivery and so it was heard before "Flowers in the Rain".) On 25 September 2007, BBC Radio 4 featured a programme called The Story of Flowers in the Rain, hosted by Tony Blackburn, on the court action and its related history, to celebrate the 40th anniversary of the song, with Blackburn also using the record to launch his programme on the new That's 60s music channel on 6 January 2023.

== Personnel ==
- Carl Wayne – lead vocals
- Roy Wood – lead guitar, со-lead vocals
- Trevor Burton – rhythm guitar
- Ace Kefford – bass guitar
- Bev Bevan – drums
- Tony Visconti – orchestral arrangements

== Charts ==
Chart (1967)	Peak position
Australia (Go-Set)	6
Belgium (Ultratop 50 Flanders)	13
Belgium (Ultratop 50 Wallonia)	17
Germany (GfK)	19
Ireland (IRMA)	4
Netherlands (Dutch Top 40)	7
Netherlands (Single Top 100)	5
New Zealand (Listener Chart)	1
Rhodesia (Lyons Maid)	4
Sweden (Tio i Topp)	13
UK Singles (Official Charts)	2
