= Robert Davidson (photographer) =

Robert Davidson is a Scottish photographer, best known for the iconic image of Frank Zappa sitting on a toilet in a London hotel room in 1967.

Born in Dundee, he left school at seventeen years old to live in Paris, where he met the Time Life photographer Emil Cadoo. Davidson returned to London two years later and began to work in fashion photography, taking the first test shots of Twiggy.

In 1965, Davidson became friends with Tony Secunda, manager of The Moody Blues, Procol Harum and The Move. Appointed Secunda's official photographer, Robert photographed The Rolling Stones, David Bowie and Arthur Brown.

During the 1970s he became a follower of the Indian guru Bhagwan Shree Rajneesh, later known as Osho.

He is the father of Holly Davidson, a British actress, and stepfather to the actress Sadie Frost.

He has exhibited his work in the UK and in Europe.
