= Night of Fear =

- Dutch 1967 release

Single by The Move
- B-side: "The Disturbance"
- Released: 9 December 1966
- Recorded: 22 October 1966
- Studio: Advision Studios, London
- Genre: Psychedelic pop; power pop; freakbeat
- Length: 2:18 (mono); 2:21 (stereo)
- Label: Deram
- Songwriter: Roy Wood
- Producer: Denny Cordell

The Move singles chronology
"Night of Fear" (1966)	"I Can Hear the Grass Grow" (1967)

"Night of Fear" is the debut single by British rock band the Move. The song, a freakbeat, psychedelic pop, and power pop record, was written by member Roy Wood and produced by Denny Cordell. The track was recorded on 22 October 1966, at Advision Studios, based in London. It was later released through Deram Records as the group's debut single later that year, on 9 December 1966, backed with "The Disturbance".

Upon its release, the track was positively received by music critics. Commercially, the single charted at number 2 on the UK Singles Chart, staying there for 10 weeks. It also peaked within the top 10 of charts in Ireland, New Zealand, and Rhodesia, and additionally charted in Australia, Denmark, the Netherlands, South Africa, and West Germany. The song was later released on the 2007 reissue of their debut studio album, Move (1968).

== Background ==
By this point in time, Wood had only written two songs, one of which was a B-side titled "Make Them Understand", which he had recorded with Mike Sheridan's Lot in September 1965 (a band which would eventually turn into The Idle Race). The other was "You're the One I Need", which was recorded by the Move in January 1966, however, that recording remained unreleased for several years. Their manager, Tony Secunda, had also started encouraging Wood to start writing more material, including tracks for a debut single. He started composing, and eventually, through the use of musical quotation, came up with two tracks, "Night of Fear" and "The Disturbance". The main riff and the bass line in the chorus is derived from Pyotr Ilyich Tchaikovsky's 1812 Overture.

At one point, Wood wanted the single's B-side "The Disturbance" to be the Move's first A-side, but "Night of Fear" was eventually chosen as it was deemed to be more commercial. Despite being an upbeat tune, the lyrics of "Night of Fear" revolve around supernatural occurrences, such as moving shadows in a hallway, along with shifting pictures in a bedroom and as such, the lyrics allude to the narrator being on an hallucinogenic substance, most likely LSD or cannabis. "The Disturbance" on the other hand, bases its lyrics on the psychologically disturbed mind of the narrator.

The song features all four of the Move's vocalists: Carl Wayne, Trevor Burton, Ace Kefford and Roy Wood in four-part harmony, primarily featuring Wayne and Wood with Kefford singing the chorus "Just about to flip your mind, just about to trip your mind".

== Release and promotion ==
"Night of Fear" was first introduced to an audience on 21 October 1966, during a performance in Croydon, South London. The reception for the song was positive, and the Move entered Advision Studios and recorded the song the following day, on 22 October. The single was released by Deram Records on 9 December 1966 with the catalogue number DM.109. (Note: The release date of 9 December 1966 is printed on promotional copies of the singles, sent around radio stations prior to the official release) The single was a large success in the UK, where it entered the charts on 11 January 1967 at a position of 32. Three weeks later, on 1 February, it peaked at number 2, a position it held for one week. The single exited the top-10 on 1 March and was last seen on 15 March at a position of 46, after which it dropped off. In total, the single spent 10 weeks on the chart, half of which were in the top-10. "Night of Fear" was also a large success in continental Europe and New Zealand. As with all singles by the Move, it did not chart on Billboard Hot 100.

The song was notably promoted, when during a visit to Manchester, they attempted to get arrested for walking around with a false H-bomb, in a stunt that was promoted by Secunda. Reviews for the song were positive. One article read "Meet the pioneers of the psychedelic sound", and as a result of its trippy sound, rumours started circulating that the word "Psychedelic" was a synonym for LSD, and that the group were using it, something later debunked by drummer Bev Bevan: "Nobody believed that Roy wasn't out of his head on drugs - but he wasn't. It was all fairy stories rooted in childhood."

=== Further releases ===
Although the song was not put onto the band's debut studio album, called Move, it did appear as the 16th track to the album on the 2007 Salvo reissue, and appeared alongside the song's B-side "The Disturbance" (just called "Disturbance" on the album) and the single to come after, "I Can Hear the Grass Grow", alongside its B-side, "Wave the Flag and Stop the Train". The song was also put onto the second disc of the album, called "New Movement", a stereo remix of the album that included tracks not originally on the album, although "The Disturbance" does not appear here.

== Personnel ==
The Move

- Carl Wayne – lead, harmony and backing vocals
- Trevor Burton – rhythm guitar, harmony and backing vocals
- Ace Kefford – bass guitar, lead (chorus), harmony and backing vocals
- Roy Wood – lead guitar, harmony and backing vocals
- Bev Bevan – drums

Additional personnel

- Denny Cordell – studio engineer, producer
- Gerald Chevin – studio engineer

== Charts ==
Chart (1966–1967)	Peak position
Australia (Kent Music Report)	42
Denmark (Danmarks Radio)	19
Ireland (IRMA)	6
Netherlands (Dutch Top 40)	19
Netherlands (Single Top 100)	18
New Zealand (Listener)	2
Rhodesia (Lyons Maid)	9
South Africa (Springbok)	16
UK Singles (Official Charts)	2
West Germany (GfK)	30
