= The Vikings (British band) =

English rock group

- Origin: Birmingham, England, United Kingdom
- Genres: Rock; Skiffle
- Years active: 1957–1965
- Labels: Pye Records
- Spinoffs: The Move
- Past members: Carl Wayne, Chris 'Ace' Kefford, Bev Bevan

The Vikings, also known as Keith Powell & the Vikings or Carl Wayne & the Vikings, were an English rock group from Birmingham, notable for including at various times Carl Wayne, Chris 'Ace' Kefford, and Bev Bevan who would later become founders of The Move. Bevan would also later co-found Electric Light Orchestra.

The Vikings started as a skiffle group in the Nechells district of Birmingham in the spring of 1957, formed by Terry Wallace and his friends George Jenkins, John "Bango" Badrick, Allan Compton, John Jolley, and Terry Smith, with their first gig being at the local Cromwell Street Working Men's Club. Barry Harber played bass from 1961 to 1964.

The band was signed to and released three singles on Pye Records in the mid-1960s, one of which – "Your Loving Ways" – was written by the group.

== Bibliography ==
- Hornsby, Laurie (1999), Lavender, Mike (ed.), Brum rocked!, Birmingham: TGM, ISBN 0953695107
