= Ace Kefford =

British musician (born 1946)

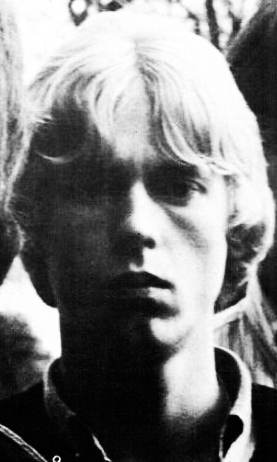
- Kefford in 1967

Background information
- Born: Christopher John Kefford; 10 December 1946 (age 79); Moseley, Birmingham, England
- Origin: Birmingham, England
- Genres: Rock
- Occupation: Musician
- Instrument: Bass guitar

Christopher John "Ace" Kefford (born 10 December 1946) is an English bassist and founding member of The Move.

== The Move ==
He was the co-founder of The Move in October 1965 with Trevor Burton, after meeting David Bowie at Birmingham's Cedar Club, following a performance by Bowie's band Davy Jones and the Lower Third. The duo invited Roy Wood, then Carl Wayne and Bev Bevan to join and complete the classic Move line-up.

Kefford's mid-1968 departure from The Move came after a period of heavy gigging and experimentation with LSD, and a nervous breakdown following a package tour with The Jimi Hendrix Experience and Pink Floyd, which took the form of a panic attack.

Wayne believed that the start of The Move's downfall was Kefford's departure, because it placed guitarist Trevor Burton into the vulnerable position of having to play more instruments, and the band could well have survived if they had recruited a keyboardist to replace Kefford. Wood recalled of Kefford, "Ever since the day we formed none of us really got on very well with him. He was a very strange person. He was very aggressive and Ace and Trevor [Burton] used to have a lot of fights all the time."

== Later works ==
After leaving The Move, Kefford embarked on a solo album with record producer, Tony Visconti, at the Olympic and Trident Studios in London. Eight songs were recorded, including a cover of Simon & Garfunkel's "Save the Life of My Child", featuring Jimmy Page on guitar. However, Kefford suffered a breakdown during the project and walked out, with the album remaining unreleased until 2003 (as Ace The Face, Sanctuary Records).

Kefford formed The Ace Kefford Stand in 1968, which included guitarist Dave Ball, bassist Denny Ball, and drummer Cozy Powell.

== Personal life ==
Kefford's later life has been plagued by alcohol, drugs, suicide attempts, and time spent in psychiatric facilities.

== Discography ==
=== The Move ===
- "Night of Fear" / "Disturbance", Deram (1966)
- "I Can Hear the Grass Grow" / "Wave the Flag & Stop the Train", Deram (1967)
- "Flowers in the Rain" / "(Here We Go Round) the Lemon Tree", Regal Zonophone (1967)
- "Fire Brigade" / "Walk Upon the Water", Regal Zonophone (1968)
- Move, Regal Zonophone (1968)
- Something Else from The Move, Regal Zonophone (1968)

=== The Ace Kefford Stand ===
- "For Your Love" / "Gravy Booby Jam", Atlantic Records (1969)

=== Solo ===
- "This World's An Apple" / "Gravy Booby Jam", Atlantic (1969, along with Big Bertha)
- Ace The Face, Castle Music Records (2003)
