= Fire Brigade (song) =

- German release picture sleeve

Single by The Move

from the album Move
- B-side: "Walk Upon the Water"
- Released: 26 January 1968
- Recorded: 23 December 1967
- Studio: De Lane Lea Studios, London
- Genre: Art pop; psychedelic pop
- Length: 2:20
- Label: Regal Zonophone (UK); A&M (US)
- Songwriter: Roy Wood

The Move singles chronology
"Flowers in the Rain" (1967)	"Fire Brigade" (1968)	"Wild Tiger Woman" (1968)

Official audio
- "Fire Brigade" on YouTube

"Fire Brigade" is a song written by Roy Wood and performed by The Move. Released as the group's fourth single in the United Kingdom on 26 January 1968, on Regal Zonophone Records and with the B-side "Walk Upon the Water", it reached No. 3 in the UK Singles Chart. The song was also released on A&M Records in the United States, although the single did not chart there. A cover version was recorded by The Fortunes and released as a single in the US, but it also did not chart. The song was released as the second and final single to the band's debut studio album, Move, in January 1968, before it was included on the album itself in March, as the 11th track to the album.

According to Wood, he wrote the song in a single overnight session after manager Tony Secunda told the band, who had just finished playing a concert, that he had a studio session lined up for the next morning and that they needed to record a single. Since Wood did not have any songs ready that he thought would be a good single, the rest of the Move left him alone in a hotel room (which they normally doubled up on) to write one. The song uses a riff derived from "Somethin' Else" by Eddie Cochran, a work that Wood would continue to reference throughout his career.

The book included with the four-CD boxed set Anthology 1966–1972, released in October 2008, noted that sessions for the song began on 16 November 1967 at Olympic Studios in Barnes, London. Anthology includes both the finished version which was released as a single, as well as an early, previously unreleased version with Matthew Fisher of Procol Harum on piano. An earlier retrospective release, the three-CD Movements: 30th Anniversary Anthology, from 1997, also has two slightly different recordings - the final version, and an undubbed one, before backing vocals, tambourine and opening 'fire engine' sound effects were added.

Glen Matlock of the Sex Pistols said some years later that the guitar on the song had strongly influenced the opening riff of their second single "God Save the Queen", from their debut studio album Never Mind the Bollocks, Here's the Sex Pistols. In Paul Stanley’s autobiography, Face The Music, Stanley indicates that the song influenced "Firehouse" from the self-titled debut album by his band Kiss.

== Personnel ==
- Roy Wood – guitars, lead vocals
- Carl Wayne – vocals (bridge)
- Trevor Burton – guitars
- Ace Kefford – bass
- Bev Bevan – drums

== Charts ==
Chart (1968)	Peak position
Canada Top Singles (RPM)	36
Germany (GfK)	28
Ireland (IRMA)	9
New Zealand (Listener)	9
UK Singles (Official Charts)	3
