= The Move =

English band

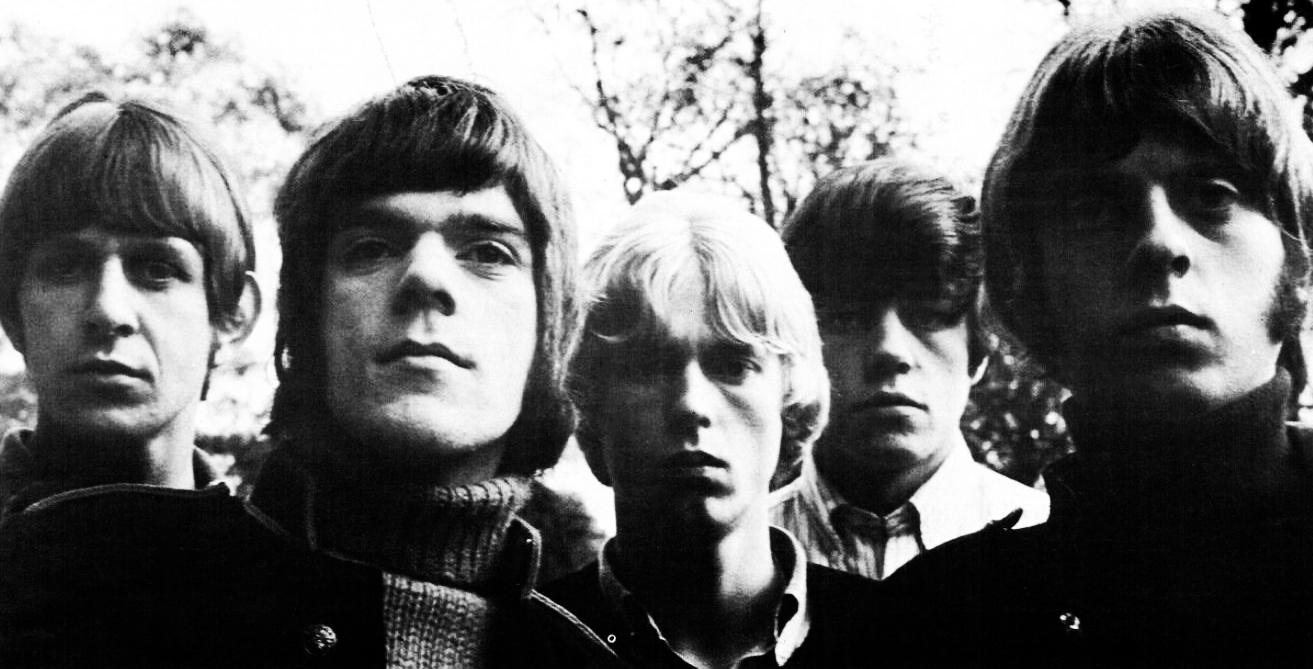
- The Move, 1967 (l-r): Carl Wayne, Roy Wood, Ace Kefford, Bev Bevan, Trevor Burton

Background information
- Origin: Birmingham, Warwickshire, England
- Genres: Rock; pop; psychedelia; freakbeat; progressive rock
- Years active: 1965–1972; 1981; 2004–2014; 2016
- Labels: Deram; Regal Zonophone; Stateside; A&M; Polydor; Fly; Ariola; Capitol; Harvest
- Spinoffs: Electric Light Orchestra; Wizzard
- Past members: Bev Bevan; Trevor Burton; Ace Kefford; Carl Wayne; Roy Wood; Rick Price; Jeff Lynne; Phil Bates; Neil Lockwood; Phil Tree; Gordon Healer; Tony Kelsey; Abby Brant

The Move were an English rock band formed in Birmingham in 1965. Their original line-up comprised lead guitarist Roy Wood, singer Carl Wayne, rhythm guitarist Trevor Burton, bassist Chris "Ace" Kefford and drummer Bev Bevan. Wood was the band leader and main songwriter, with lead vocal duties falling to Wayne, while Wood, Burton and Kefford also contributed lead and backing vocals. By 1971, the band was reduced to a trio of Wood, Bevan and guitarist/singer/songwriter Jeff Lynne (formerly of the Idle Race), who joined in 1970. The Move scored nine top 20 UK singles in five years, but were among the most popular British bands of the 1960s and 1970s not to achieve major success in the United States.

The Move evolved from several mid-1960s Birmingham-based groups, including Carl Wayne & the Vikings, the Nightriders and the Mayfair Set. Their name referred to the move various members of these bands made to form the group. During their time together, the band released four studio albums, two compilation albums, one live extended play and 18 singles. After their first two singles, "Night of Fear" and "I Can Hear the Grass Grow" hit number 2 and number 5 on the UK singles chart, the band released their self-titled debut in 1968, which hit number 15 on the UK Official Albums Chart and garnered two more top 10 singles, "Flowers in the Rain" and "Fire Brigade". After 1968, the band would have three more singles in the top 10, including the number 1 hit "Blackberry Way". The band released three more studio albums – Shazam, Looking On and Message from the Country – before their breakup in 1972. The band's later years saw Wood, Lynne and Bevan develop a side project called Electric Light Orchestra, which would go on to achieve major international success after The Move disbanded. Wood would later leave that group and form Wizzard.

In 1981, the band briefly reunited for a one-off charity concert, consisting of Bevan, Wood and Kefford. Twenty-three years later, in 2004, Bevan would form the "Bev Bevan Band" with former ELO Part II bandmates Phil Bates and Neil Lockwood. Bevan later rebranded this group as "Bev Bevan's Move" and – beginning in 2006 – featured Trevor Burton as an occasional guest in shows, before he became a permanent member of the group. Between 2007 and 2014, Burton and Bevan, alongside Lockwood and new members Phil Tree, Gordon Healer, Tony Kelsey and Abby Brant, performed intermittently as "The Move featuring Bev Bevan and Trevor Burton". The band's most recent reunion would happen in 2016, as "Bev Bevan's Zing Band", with Bevan and latter-era members Tree, Brant and Kelsey, alongside new member Geoff Turton.

== History ==
=== 1965–1968: Formation and early career ===
==== Initial singles and debut album ====
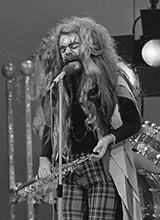
Roy Wood (pictured performing with Wizzard in 1974), who helped form the group in 1965

The Move were formed in December 1965 and played their debut show at the Belfry, Wishaw, on 23 January 1966. The original intentions of Trevor Burton, Ace Kefford and Roy Wood were to start a group from among Birmingham's best musicians—along similar lines to the Who. The three played together at jam sessions at Birmingham's Cedar Club and invited Carl Wayne and Bev Bevan to join their new group. After a debut at the Bell Hotel in Stourbridge in January 1966 and further bookings around the Birmingham area, Moody Blues manager Tony Secunda offered to manage them. At the time, The Move mainly played covers of American west coast groups such as the Byrds together with Motown and rock 'n' roll songs. Many of the band's selections for their songs came from the extensive record collection of Danny King, a former bandmate of Burton. Although Wayne handled most of the lead vocals, all the band members shared harmonies and each was allowed at least one lead vocal per show (and often traded lead vocals within specific songs).

Secunda got them a weekly residency at London's Marquee Club in 1966, where they appeared dressed as gangsters. Their early career was marked by a series of publicity stunts, high-profile media events and outrageous stage antics masterminded by Secunda; these included Wayne taking an axe to television sets. Wood was uncomfortable with this sensationalism and many concert promoters responded by banning The Move from live performances, but the stunts succeeded in drawing media attention and concert audiences to the group. Eventually, Secunda also managed to persuade Wood to begin writing songs for the band during his time off. They secured a production contract with independent record producer Denny Cordell, but that was turned into a media event by Secunda, who arranged for the band to sign their contracts on the back of Liz Wilson, a topless female model. Wood wrote their first single, "Night of Fear", a No. 2 hit on the UK Singles Chart in January 1967, which began The Move's practice of musical quotation (in this case, the 1812 Overture by Tchaikovsky). Their second single, "I Can Hear the Grass Grow", was another major hit, reaching No. 5 in the UK.

In April 1967, NME reported that The Move had offered a £200 reward (equivalent to £3,200 in 2025) for the recovery of the master tapes of ten songs intended for their debut album. The tapes were stolen from their agent's car when it was parked in Denmark Street, London. The tapes were found in a skip (dumpster) shortly afterward, but the damage caused to them meant that new mixes and masters would have to be made, resulting in the delayed album only being released in March 1968 instead of the original plan of autumn 1967. Their third single "Flowers in the Rain" was the first chart single played on BBC Radio 1 when it began broadcasting at 7 am on 30 September 1967, introduced by Tony Blackburn. The single, which reached No. 2 in the UK, was less guitar-orientated than their previous two singles and featured a woodwind and string arrangement by Cordell's assistant Tony Visconti. The track was released on the re-launched Regal Zonophone label.

==== Legal issues ====
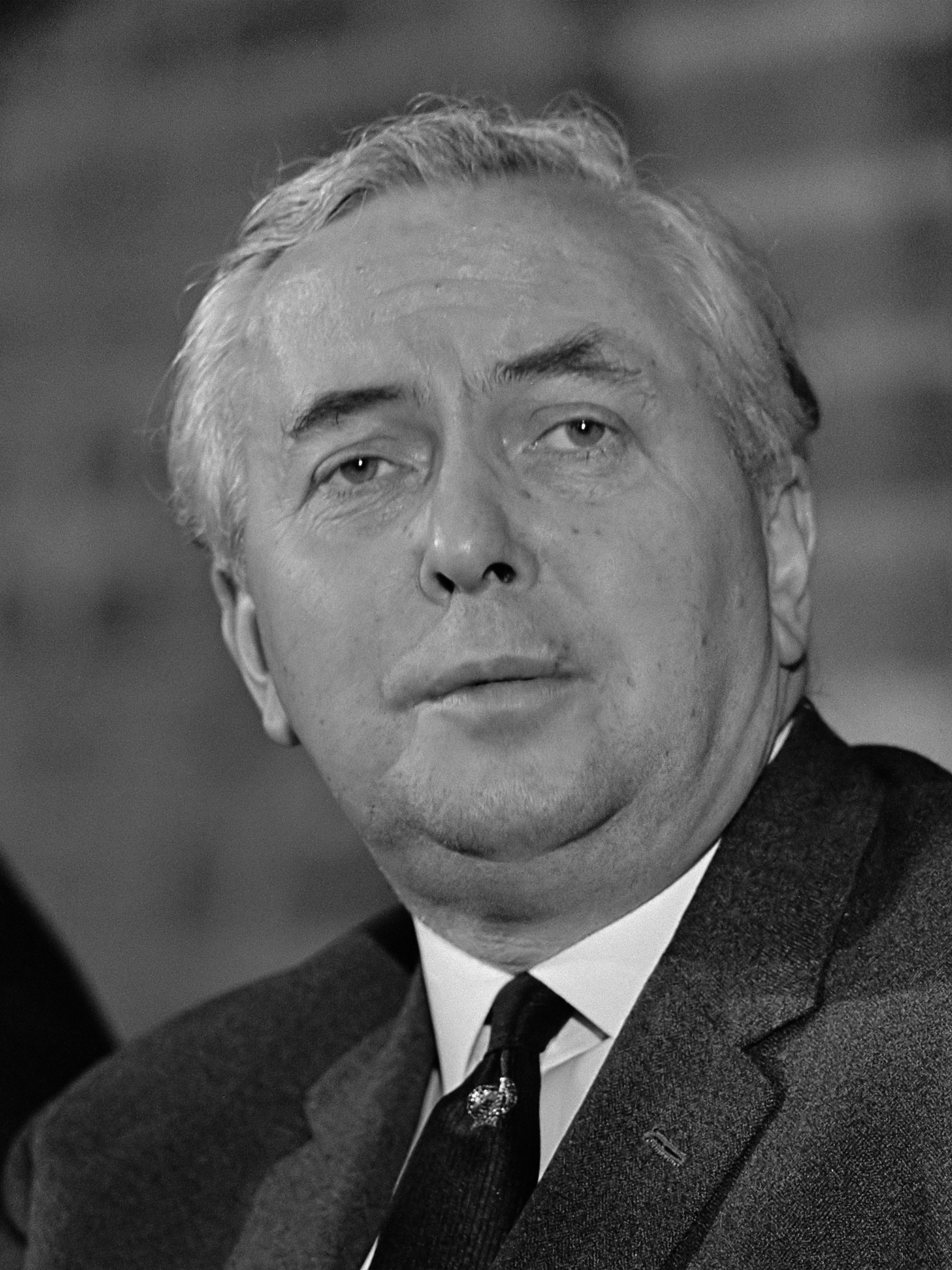
The Move got into controversy when an ad for their single "Flowers in the Rain" depicted UK prime minister Harold Wilson (pictured c. 1967) sleeping with his secretary, Marcia Williams.

Without consulting the band, Secunda produced a cartoon postcard to promote the single "Flowers in the Rain"; this showed the prime minister of the United Kingdom, Harold Wilson, in bed with his secretary, Marcia Williams. Wilson sued The Move for libel and the group lost the lawsuit; they had to pay all costs, and all royalties earned by the song were awarded to charities of Wilson's choice. The ruling remained in force even after Wilson's death in 1995. In the Family Trees documentary special on the Birmingham music scene, Wood says that while the band as a whole lost their royalties, it affected him the most, as he wrote the song.

For their fourth single the group had planned to release "Cherry Blossom Clinic", a lighthearted song about the fantasies of a patient in a mental institution, backed by the satirical "Vote for Me". However, The Move had been unnerved by their court experiences; they and the record label felt it unwise to pursue such a potentially controversial idea, so the single was shelved. "Vote for Me" remained unreleased until it appeared on retrospective collections from 1997 onwards, while "Cherry Blossom Clinic" became one of the tracks on their first LP, called Move.

As a direct consequence of the lawsuit, The Move fired Secunda and hired Don Arden, who had himself recently been fired as manager of the Small Faces. In a 2000 interview, Wayne noted that there had always been a major split within the group about Secunda's tactics: "[Secunda] had the animals who would do what he wanted to do in Trevor, Ace, and me—the fiery part of the stage act. I think Roy would obviously qualify this himself, but I believe he was slightly embarrassed by the image and the stunts—but the rest of us weren't ... We were always willing to be Secunda puppets."

=== 1967–1970: Pop success and dissolution ===
==== Live performances and line-up changes ====
During November and December 1967 the group took part in another package tour around the UK, playing two shows a night over sixteen days, as part of an all-star bill that included the Jimi Hendrix Experience, Pink Floyd, the Nice, Eire Apparent, the Outer Limits, Amen Corner, along with then-BBC Radio 1 DJ Pete Drummond. In March 1968, The Move returned to the charts with "Fire Brigade", another UK Top 3 hit, and the first on which Wood sang lead vocal. A few weeks later, around the time of the LP's release, Kefford was let go from the band because of increasing personal problems escalated by drug usage. Wood stated that from the day the band was founded, Kefford had not got along well with any of the other band members. The Move then became a four-piece, in which Burton and (occasionally) Wayne took turns on bass on stage.

The Move were on the bill at the inaugural Isle of Wight Festival on 31 August 1968. In mid-1968, their fifth single "Wild Tiger Woman", a song acknowledging the group's love of Jimi Hendrix (Wood and Burton sang backing vocals on "You Got Me Floatin'" on the Jimi Hendrix Experience's second album, Axis: Bold as Love), sold poorly and failed to make the UK chart. The Move responded with their most commercially successful song to date, "Blackberry Way" (co-produced by Jimmy Miller), which topped the UK chart in February 1969. Wayne refused to sing the song, so it was recorded as a trio with Wood again handling lead vocal. Richard Tandy played keyboards on "Blackberry Way" and joined the band for a time, playing keyboards live and switching to bass when Burton was briefly sidelined with a shoulder injury. Upon Burton's recovery, Tandy departed to join the Uglys. The new, more pop-orientated musical direction and the single hitting number one was the last straw for the increasingly disenchanted Burton, who wanted to work in a more hard rock/blues-focused style, and he left the group in February 1969 after an altercation on stage with Bevan in Sweden.

At this time the band invited Jeff Lynne, a friend of Wood, to join. He turned down the offer, because he was still working toward success in the Idle Race, another Birmingham-based group. It was rumoured in the music press that Hank Marvin of the recently disbanded Shadows had been invited to join The Move. Some years later, Wayne recalled that to be nothing more than a publicity stunt; however, Marvin himself, in an article in Melody Maker in 1973 and elsewhere, has maintained that he was approached by Wood and invited to join The Move, but declined because their schedule was too hectic for him. Bevan confirmed in a 2014 interview that the band invited Marvin, but they never expected him to accept. Burton was ultimately replaced in 1969 by Rick Price, another veteran of several Birmingham rock groups, who joined on a temporary, non-contractual basis. Thus, the group in spring 1969 consisted of Wayne (vocals), Wood (guitar, vocals), Bevan (drums) and Price (bass, vocals).

Both Ace Kefford and Trevor Burton struggled commercially after leaving The Move. Kefford formed his own short-lived group, the Ace Kefford Stand, with Cozy Powell on drums. After this, he pursued a solo career and recorded a solo album in 1968, but it remained un-released until 2003 when it appeared as Ace The Face. Burton played bass with yet another Birmingham group, the Steve Gibbons Band, was one-third of the short-lived band Balls (with Denny Laine and Alan White), and later fronted his own blues group as lead guitarist.

==== Shazam ====
In October 1969, The Move made their only concert appearances in the US, opening two shows for the Stooges in Detroit and playing dates in Los Angeles and at the Fillmore West in San Francisco. When neither their US record company nor promoters showed any more interest—the band even had to make their own accommodation & travel arrangements—the remaining proposed tour dates in New York were cancelled and the group returned home. During that period, Arden sold The Move's management contract to impresario Peter Walsh, who was at the time also managing the Marmalade. Walsh, who specialised in cabaret acts, began booking the band into cabaret-style venues, which further increased the tension between Wayne and Wood. Bevan later said the others felt "old before their time" when playing cabaret dates. By this point, Wood was openly discussing his desire to form a band playing more eclectic music, including both harder rock and classical instruments, which he tentatively dubbed "The Electric Light Orchestra".

The Move's second album, 1970's Shazam, continued The Move's practice of musical quotation and of elaborately rearranged versions of other performers' songs. "Hello Susie" (a Wood composition), which was a Top 5 hit for Amen Corner in 1969, quoted Booker T. Jones' and Eddie Floyd's "Big Bird". The album also featured a slightly slower re-recording of "Cherry Blossom Clinic", an instrumental medley of public domain works and a cover of a Tom Paxton song, "The Last Thing on My Mind". Despite such superficial similarities with their past, however, the album represented a clear break from The Move's identity as a pop group, reintroducing them as a hard-edged underground band. Burton played bass on a couple of tracks as they had been recorded before he left, although this was not credited at the time.

Well aware that Wood was intent on setting up his new, orchestral rock project, Wayne suggested that Wood concentrate on performing with his new band while continuing to write songs for The Move, which would be reorganised with a lineup consisting of Wayne, Burton and Kefford; however, his suggestion was rejected by Wood, Bevan and Price, so after getting angry and embarrassed witnessing a fight between Wood and a drunken audience member in Sheffield, Wayne quit the group in January 1970, a month before the release of Shazam. He subsequently worked in a variety of musical ventures and appeared on television and radio. In 2000, he replaced Allan Clarke as lead singer of the Hollies and performed with them as lead singer until his death from cancer in 2004.

=== 1970–1971: Jeff Lynne and Looking On ===
Upon Wayne's departure, the Move jettisoned Walsh as manager and returned to Arden. Lynne agreed to join the band as a second guitarist and pianist, enthused by Wood's ELO idea. Wood also wanted a second songwriter in the band to relieve the pressure on himself. The band's first recording with Lynne was a single, "Brontosaurus". Feeling nervous as the band were about to go on stage for a television spot for the song, Wood spontaneously combed his hair out to make it look wild and applied black-and-white makeup with a star in the middle of his forehead, thus birthing the "Wizzard" image he would use extensively in his post-Move career and helping define The Move's image for the rest of their run. Soon afterward, the band toured Ireland and Germany. In August 1970, the group was the lead act at the Knighton Rock Festival, staged in the small Radnorshire town of Knighton. In a radio interview, Bevan stated that The Move had ceased playing all of their prior songs except for "I Can Hear the Grass Grow" and were now playing mostly originals except for a few re-arranged covers (such as "She's a Woman"), as the band transitioned from mainstream pop toward progressive rock with its new alignment.

For the rest of the year, the Move concentrated on studio work, because they still owed one more album under their existing contract with Essex Music (David Platz) – which Essex Music was planning to use to set up its own record label, Fly Records. To prepare for their new direction, Wood and Lynne overdubbed multiple instruments, including piano, woodwinds, sitar and a Chinese cello that Wood had bought. However, before the third album Looking On was completed, Arden signed the new Wood-Lynne-Bevan band (without Price, who was not under contract with The Move) to a three-album deal with the Harvest Records division of EMI that included a £25,000 (equivalent to £340,000 in 2025) advance – announced at the time as £100,000 (equivalent to £1,400,000 in 2025), but still more money – £8,333 each (equivalent to £114,293.501 in 2025) than the band had seen so far, despite its success. As a result, by the time Looking On was released in December 1970, with five songs composed by Wood and two by Lynne, Fly Records had lost interest in it, despite the fact that the album included a No. 7 hit, "Brontosaurus", which was the band's last recording for Regal Zonophone.

The second single from the album, "When Alice Comes Back to the Farm", failed to chart on Fly. The song intended as the B-side of that single, "10538 Overture", was ultimately held by the band for its new Electric Light Orchestra project, and Price's bass line was deleted and re-recorded by Wood, since Price was not part of the new group. Price in fact was unaware that The Move were working without him, until he heard about new material being made in early 1971. He then pursued other projects, including the band Mongrel, although he later rejoined Wood in Wizzard and the short-lived Wizzo Band. He went on to work in musical management and also formed the duo Price and Lee with his wife Dianne Lee, formerly of the duo Peters and Lee.

=== 1971–1972: Message from the Country and breakup ===
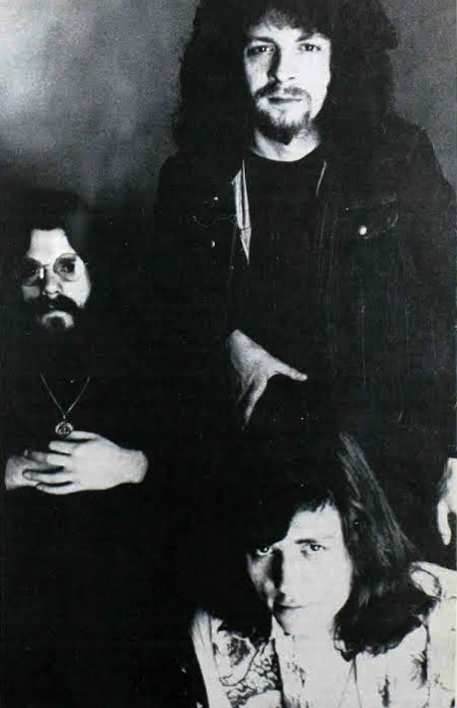
The Move/Electric Light Orchestra in 1972

Although Wood, Lynne and Bevan had intended Looking On to be the final Move album, Harvest requested that the new group first release a new Move album, in the same vein as Looking On, as the first album under its new deal, with the other two albums to be credited to the new group, in order to recoup the advance given to the band. As a result, the band recorded the last Move album and the first Electric Light Orchestra album at the same time—even during the same lengthy recording sessions (due to all the overdubbing by Wood and Lynne). The final Move LP, Message from the Country, was released in summer 1971. Wood's "Ben Crawley Steel Company" featured a Bevan lead vocal that was modelled on Johnny Cash, while Bevan's "Don't Mess Me Up" (sung by Wood) paid homage to Elvis Presley, complete with fake Jordanaires. Although Wood and music critics continue to hold Message from the Country in high regard, in 2005 Bevan referred to that album as his least favourite from The Move. The album was followed by two more Wood-penned hit singles, "Tonight" and "Chinatown". For several television appearances behind those songs, The Move added two musicians who became members of the original ELO: Bill Hunt (horns, woodwinds, piano) and a returning Richard Tandy (guitar, bass).

In 1972, after the release of the first Electric Light Orchestra album, the Move released what turned out to be a farewell record, a maxi single consisting of "California Man", "Ella James" (from Message, but a track originally planned by EMI to be their first single on the Harvest label) and "Do Ya". "California Man", a No. 7 UK hit—featuring baritone saxophones, a double bass and a riff borrowed from George Gershwin—was an affectionate tribute to Jerry Lee Lewis (the double bass had Lewis's nickname, "Killer", written on it) and Little Richard, with Lynne and Wood trading verses and lines. Meanwhile, Lynne's "Do Ya" became the Move's best-known song in the US; it was the only Move song to reach the US Billboard Hot 100 chart at No. 93. (However, the Electric Light Orchestra's remake of "Do Ya", recorded after Wood's departure, was a significant US hit in 1977.) With the release of the album The Electric Light Orchestra, within weeks of the last single being released, they appeared on television promoting both The Move's last single and ELO's debut single (the long-delayed "10538 Overture") at the same time. Wood and Hunt quit ELO during the early recording sessions of ELO's second album, ELO 2, which was the group's final album under their Harvest Records contract. Wood went on to front the glam rock band Wizzard, as well as releasing a solo album in 1973, Boulders, while Lynne, Bevan and Tandy kept touring as ELO and finally achieved international success. Boulders was recorded during Wood's time with The Move, but its release was held off because Lynne and Bevan wished it not to compete with the Move's albums.

=== 1981, 2004–2014, 2016: Group reunions ===
A one-off reunion occurred on 28 April, 1981, at the Locarno in Birmingham, involving Wood, Bevan and Kefford. Several other Birmingham bands of the era also reunited for the event, which was a charity fundraiser. The band would not reunite again until 2004, 23 years later.

After Wayne's death in 2004, Bevan formed the Bev Bevan Band—shortly to be renamed 'Bev Bevan's Move' (with no other past members), in order to capitalise on the Move's continuing reputation and belated success. Bevan recruited former ELO Part II colleagues guitarist Phil Bates and keyboard player Neil Lockwood, plus bassist Phil Tree, to play a set on tour composed mostly of classics by the Move. Wood expressed extreme displeasure at that development.

Former Move guitarist Burton joined the band on occasion during 2006 and joined permanently in 2007 (Wayne had tried to broker a reunion between Bevan and Burton before his death and had planned to be involved with the new band). Bates departed in July 2007 to re-join ELO Part II (now renamed the Orchestra) and was replaced with Gordon Healer. The Autumn 2007 tour was billed as "the Move featuring Trevor Burton and Bev Bevan".

In 2014, the band toured as the Move with a lineup consisting of Bevan, Burton, Tree, keyboardist/vocalist Abby Brant and guitarist/vocalist Tony Kelsey. On 2 May 2014, Bev Bevan announced through a Facebook post that The Move had broken up and that he and Burton would tour separately with groups called "the Bev Bevan Band" and "the Trevor Burton Band". In December 2014 the Bev Bevan Band completed their "Stand Up And Rock" tour, which lasted for almost 50 dates, in conjunction with Bevan's childhood friend Jasper Carrott. Guests on the tour included Trevor Burton, Geoff Turton and Joy Strachan-Brain, alongside Bevan, Kelsey, Tree and Brant.

In 2016 the band announced that they had re-formed and were due to perform at The Core Theatre in Solihull, West Midlands, with a line-up consisting of Bevan, Burton, Tree and Kelsey; however, it was later revealed that the band performing would no longer be billed as 'the Move', but as 'Bev Bevan's Zing Band', and would not feature Burton; with the line-up consisting of Bevan, Tree and Kelsey, along with a returning Abby Brant and Geoff Turton on lead vocals.

== Personnel ==
=== Members ===
Final lineup

- Bev Bevan – drums, percussion, vocals (1965–1972, 2004–2014)
- Trevor Burton – guitar, bass, vocals (1965–1969, 2007–2014) (guest 2006–2007)
- Phil Tree – bass, vocals (2004–2014)
- Abby Brant – keyboards, vocals (2014)
- Tony Kelsey – guitar, vocals (2014)

== Discography ==
- Move (1968)
- Shazam (1970)
- Looking On (1970)
- Message from the Country (1971)
