= Trevor Burton =

British guitarist (born 1949)

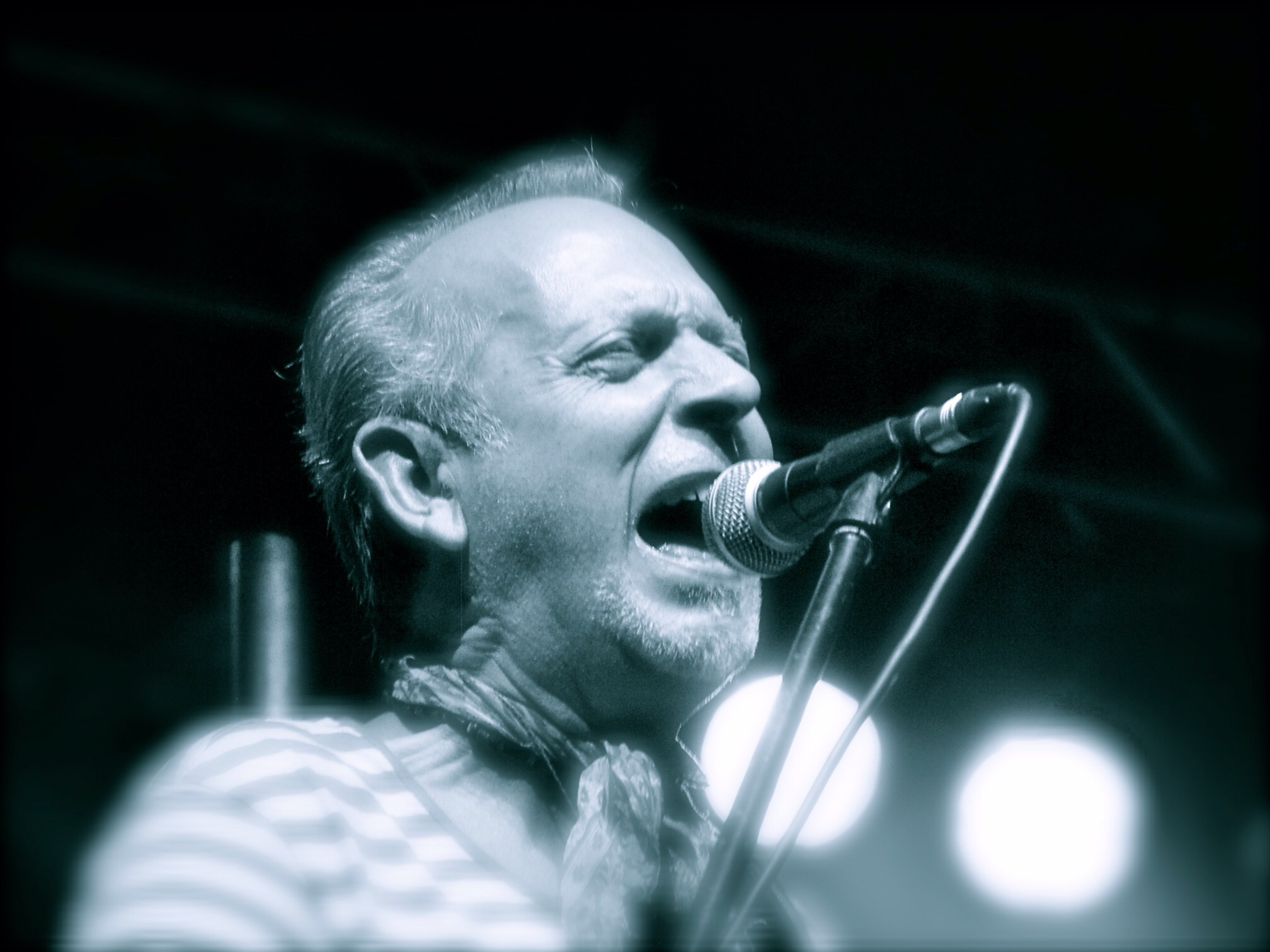
- Burton performing in 2014

Background information
- Born: Trevor James Ireson; 9 March 1949 (age 77)
- Origin: Aston, Birmingham, England
- Genres: Rock, blues
- Occupation: Musician
- Instruments: Guitar, bass, vocals

Trevor Burton (born Trevor Ireson; 9 March 1949 in Aston, Birmingham) is an English guitarist and is a founding member of the Move.

== Career ==
Burton started playing guitar at a young age and was leading his own group called the Everglades by 1963. In 1964 he joined Danny King & the Mayfair Set, along with Keith Smart (drums, formerly of the Everglades), Roger Harris (keyboards), Denis Ball (bass) and vocalist King. The band cut a couple of singles but could not break outside the Birmingham area. Burton accepted an invitation from other Birmingham musicians to form the Move in January 1966, remaining with them until February 1969.

=== The Move ===
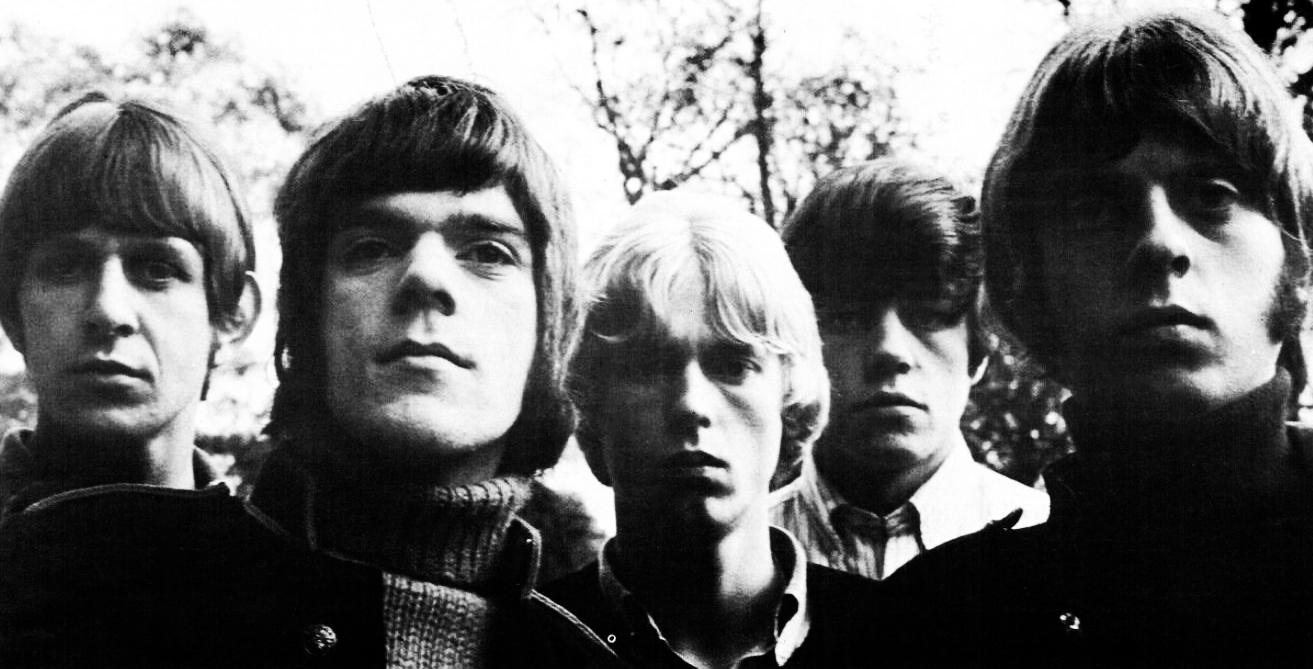
Burton (far right) with the Move in 1967

The original line-up of the Move contained singer Carl Wayne, lead guitarist/multi-instrumentalist/songwriter/singer Roy Wood, drummer Bev Bevan, bassist Ace Kefford and Burton on rhythm guitar. Wayne was the usual lead singer, but Wood (who wrote the majority of the original material at this stage), Kefford and Burton were also lead singers to some capacity. Despite a following in their native Birmingham, the fledgling band were in dire need of management and exposure to the music scene in London, so Moody Blues manager Tony Secunda became their manager. Secunda brought the band to London and secured them a weekly residency at the famous Marquee Club, recently vacated by the Who. He dressed them up as American gangsters, staged a contract signing on topless model Liz Wilson, steered them away from their early Motown-style sound and towards a more psychedelic West Coast-influenced live sound and encouraged Wood to write more original material.

"Night of Fear" was the debut single by the Move, released on Deram Records and hitting No. 2 in the UK singles chart. Hit singles during Burton's tenure in the group included "I Can Hear the Grass Grow", "Flowers in the Rain", "Fire Brigade", "Wild Tiger Woman" and "Blackberry Way". The group's 1968 eponymous debut album was to be the only full-length LP release by the original line-up, before Kefford quit the band after having an LSD-induced breakdown. The group carried on as a quartet with Burton shifting to bass. With "Blackberry Way" (with Wood and Bevan's future Electric Light Orchestra bandmate Richard Tandy playing harpsichord) hit No. 1 in the UK after the commercial failure of "Wild Tiger Woman", Burton was growing unhappy with Wood's lighter material with the shift into commercial pop. Although the Move initially intended to add Tandy to their line-up as a keyboardist, when Burton fractured his shoulder, Tandy switched to bass for a few gigs and TV shows, and left to join the Uglys upon Burton's recovery. After a fight onstage with Bevan at a show in Sweden, Burton quit the band to pursue a blues career. Burton was replaced on bass by Rick Price.

=== Later career ===
Burton was rumoured to be forming a new group with Noel Redding, who, like Burton, was a guitarist who had switched to bass. Burton and Redding shared an apartment in London at that time, and Roy Wood suspected the prospect of forming a band with Redding had encouraged Burton in his decision to leave the Move. However, nothing came of this. Burton jammed with members of Traffic and became a friend of Steve Winwood, and almost joined Blind Faith in 1969. He later said that he "nearly got the job on bass – Steve wanted me, I think," but Ginger Baker wanted Ric Grech instead. Burton then teamed up with Steve Gibbons, who fronted the long-established Birmingham group the Uglys. Burton and Gibbons, along with Uglys' rhythm section Keith Smart and Dave Morgan, plus keyboardist Richard Tandy created a Birmingham supergroup to be named Balls.

Balls was managed by one-time Moody Blues/Move manager Tony Secunda. Following in the trend of Chris Blackwell's Traffic, Secunda arranged for the new group to "get it together" in the country at a rented cottage on the Berkshire Downs and also hired Traffic's record producer Jimmy Miller for the group's recording sessions. With Secunda arranging a large Malcolm McLaren style cash advance from the record company, the group started to compose and record new material while playing a few local gigs. Morgan left during the summer of 1969, to be replaced by Denny Laine, ex-singer/guitarist of the Moody Blues. But Balls split at the end of 1969, with Tandy joining the Move (for live gigs only), then Electric Light Orchestra, and Smart eventually joining Wizzard. Balls reconvened as a quartet the following summer, with Laine, Burton, former Plastic Ono Band drummer Alan White and vocalist Jackie Lomax. Lomax was soon replaced by the returning Gibbons, and ex-Spooky Tooth drummer Mike Kellie replaced White in January 1971.

The group's only release was a single that came out on Tony Secunda's Wizard record label in January 1971 and was re-issued under Burton's name in June 1972. The song "Fight For My Country" was an anti-war anthem composed and sung by Burton, and included backing vocals from Steve Gibbons and Denny Laine, who played bass guitar on the track.

Burton guested on bass guitar with Crushed Butler in 1970 and cut twelve studio recordings with the group intended for release on Tony Secunda's Wizard record label. Shortly thereafter, Burton guested on rhythm guitar with the Pink Fairies between August 1971 to July 1972, staying with the band long enough to appear on a BBC live session and two songs from their second album entitled What a Bunch of Sweeties. He also recorded with Steve Peregrin Took (although none of their material together has surfaced) and worked with Birmingham vocalist Raymond Froggatt until 1975.

After Balls, Steve Gibbons joined the Birmingham group the Idle Race which eventually became the Steve Gibbons Band. Burton joined in April 1975, and the group enjoyed a hit single in 1977 with the Chuck Berry song, "Tulane" as well as touring America extensively.

Burton left Steve Gibbons in 1983 to form his own band. They started performing twice weekly at the Red Lion in Balsall Heath, Birmingham with a line-up including sax player Steve Ajao. In 1985 the band recorded an album entitled Double Zero (BARLP1) featuring Stuart Ford (slide guitar), Crumpy (bass), Tony Baylis (drums) and Ben Annon (percussion). The band has gone through a number of iterations, and at one point included former Uglys/Balls/Move/Electric Light Orchestra keyboardist Richard Tandy. By 1993, Trevor was joined by Maz Mitrenko on lead guitar and later by drummer, Bill Jefferson and bass player, Pez Connor as the Trevor Burton Band. When Burton was taken ill in the late 2010s, his sidemen continued as the "Trevor Burtonless Band" often playing benefit gigs for Burton.

Former Move drummer Bev Bevan had been touring as "Bev Bevan's Move" since 2004, augmented on occasion by Trevor Burton. Burton joined permanently in 2007 and the Autumn 2007 tour was billed as "The Move featuring Trevor Burton and Bev Bevan".

On 20 April 2018, Burton released his first solo acoustic record, Long Play, on Gray Sky Records. The record includes songs written by Burton as well as acoustic renditions of songs by critical modern song writers such as John Darnielle of the Mountain Goats, Vic Chesnutt, Jeff Mangum of Neutral Milk Hotel.
