= Advision Studios =

Former recording studio in London, England

General information
- Location: 23 Gosfield Street, W1W 6HG, Central London, England
- Coordinates: 51°31′11″N 0°8′31″W

Advision Studios was a recording studio in Fitzrovia, central London, England.

== Origins ==
Founded in 1954 by Guy Whetstone and Stephen Appleby, Advision originally provided voiceovers and jingles for television advertisements. The studio was initially located at 83 New Bond Street, but moved to 23 Gosfield Street in 1969. The studio complex was built to be able to house a 60-piece studio orchestra and had a 35mm film projector screen for synchronising with motion picture images. Producer Martin Rushent began his career as a projectionist at Advision.

== History ==
By the mid-1960s, Advision had become one of the top London studios for rock and pop music. The Yardbirds recorded their 1966 album Roger the Engineer at Advision on a four-track machine. The Move recorded some of their early hits at Advision, engineered by Gerald Chevin, including "Flowers in the Rain" in July 1967. In early 1968, Advision became one of the first studios in the United Kingdom to obtain a professional quality eight-track machine, a Scully model 280 imported from the United States. Among the early artists to use the eight-track machine were T. Rex, the Who and Caravan. In 1970, the studio had a custom 24-channel desk, still recording to eight-track tape. Advision was also among the first studios in the UK to install 16 and 24-track machines in the early 1970s.

In 1971, a 20-channel Neve console was added to the mixdown suite. During the 1970s the studios' focus moved towards progressive rock music, and the company began producing music for bands such as Yes, Gentle Giant, Emerson, Lake & Palmer and Premiata Forneria Marconi, as well as Jeff Wayne's Musical Version of The War of the Worlds.

A 1974 re-fitting gave the studio a console built in California by Quad-Eight Electronics for quadraphonic mixing, and the UK's first computer-aided mixdown desk. Producers and engineers who worked at Advision include Eddy Offord, Eddie Kramer, Martin Rushent, Paul Northfield and Hugh Padgham.

In 1990, the studio moved out of London. The new location opened in October in a converted church in Brighton, while the company simultaneously operated a mobile recording truck. The Gosfield Street location has been occupied since 1993 by a studio called The Sound Company.

== Partial discography ==
The following is a partial list of work either recorded, mixed or mastered at Advision Studios between 1966 and 1986, taken from .

Artist	Title
Alexis Korner	Just Easy (1978)
David Bowie	The Man Who Sold the World (1970)
Buzzcocks	Love Bites (1978)
Cat Stevens	Back to Earth (1978)
David Essex	Rock On (1973)
Emerson, Lake & Palmer	Tarkus (1971), Trilogy (1972), Brain Salad Surgery (1973)
Elton John	Caribou (1974)
Gentle Giant	The Power and the Glory (1974)
Jeff Wayne	The War of the Worlds (1978)
John Mayall	Empty Rooms (1969)
John's Children	Orgasm (1970)
Kate Bush	The Dreaming (1982)
Mott the Hoople	The Hoople (1974)
The Move	Shazam (1970)
Orchestral Manoeuvres in the Dark	Organisation (1980)
Osibisa	Osibisa (1971)
Pet Shop Boys	Please (1986)
Public Image Ltd	Public Image: First Issue (1978)
Queen	Flash Gordon (1980)
Rush	A Farewell to Kings (1977)
Slade	Whatever Happened to Slade (1977)
Soft Machine	Fifth (1972)
T.Rex	My People Were Fair (1968)
Wham!	Last Christmas (1984)
Yardbirds	Roger the Engineer (1966)
Yes	Yes (1969), Time and a Word (1970), The Yes Album (1971), Fragile (1971),Close to the Edge (1972)
Rory Gallagher	Rory Gallagher (1971)
Gerry Rafferty	City to City (1978)
Jimmy Somerville	Read My Lips (1989)
