= Carl Wayne =

English singer and actor (1943–2004)

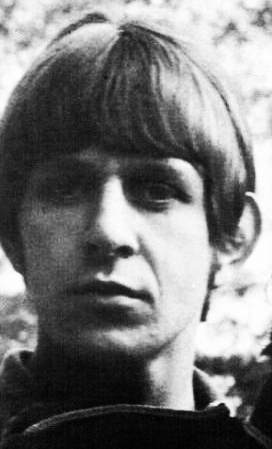
- Wayne in 1967

Background information
- Born: Colin David Tooley; 18 August 1943; Winson Green, Birmingham, Warwickshire, England
- Died: 31 August 2004 (aged 61) Pyrford, Surrey, England
- Genres: Rock
- Occupations: Singer, actor
- Instruments: Vocals; bass guitar
- Years active: 1967–2004
- Labels: Deram, Regal Zonophone, RCA, DJM, Jet Records
- Formerly of: The Vikings, The Move, The Hollies
- Spouse: Susan Hanson
- Website: carlwayne.co.uk

Colin David Tooley (18 August 1943 – 31 August 2004), better known as Carl Wayne, was an English singer and actor. He is best remembered as the lead singer of The Move, a group that he co-founded in 1965. He sings lead on several of the band's hits, such as "Curly", "Flowers in the Rain and "I Can Hear the Grass Grow."

Wayne was born and raised in Birmingham and entered the music business playing bass guitar. However, he switched to vocals and formed the G-Men, but later joined The Vikings (later Carl Wayne and the Vikings), a band which also included Ace Kefford and Bev Bevan. Kefford and Trevor Burton formed a group, The Move, which Wayne, Bevan, and Roy Wood would join, hitting huge success within the band. He left in 1970, and pursued a cabaret career with slight success.

Wayne notably played Tom-Tom and Odd Job John in several episodes of Emu's TV programmes. In 2000, he joined The Hollies, and performed with them until his death in 2004.

== Early days ==
Wayne was born in the area of Winson Green, Birmingham, and grew up in the Hodge Hill part of the city.

== Musical career ==
=== Early musical career ===
Inspired by the American rock'n'roll of Elvis Presley, Eddie Cochran and Gene Vincent, he formed the G-Men in the late 1950s, and joined local band the Vikings, where his powerful baritone voice and pink stage suit helped make them one of the leading rock groups in the Midlands. He initially played bass guitar and played the instrument in a gig for the Vikings, though decided to ditch the bass after he didn't enjoy his playing. His change of name was inspired by the movie star John Wayne, with the Scandinavian 'Carl' to fit into the 'Vikings' theme. In 1963 they followed in the footsteps of the Beatles and other Liverpool bands by performing in the clubs of Frankfurt, Stuttgart, and Nuremberg. On returning to Birmingham, in the wake of the Beatles' success, record companies were keen to sign similar guitar bands. The Vikings signed with Pye Records, but all three singles failed to chart.

Wayne represented England at the prestigious Golden Orpheus Song Festival in Bulgaria. In front of a live and televised audience of over 20 million, Wayne won first prize.

=== The Move ===
In December 1965 he joined the Move, a Birmingham beat supergroup drawn from top local bands. They included three members of the Vikings (bass guitarist Chris 'Ace' Kefford, drummer Bev Bevan and Wayne himself), Trevor Burton (lead guitarist with Danny King and the Mayfair Set), and Roy Wood (lead guitarist with Mike Sheridan and the Nightriders). They enjoyed three years of hits with singles such as "Night of Fear", "I Can Hear The Grass Grow", "Flowers in the Rain", "Fire Brigade", and their number-one success "Blackberry Way". In their early years the Move had a stage act which occasionally saw Wayne taking an axe to television sets, or chainsawing a Cadillac to pieces at the Roundhouse, London, during "Fire Brigade", an escapade which resulted in the Soho area being jammed with fire engines, and the group being banned for a while from every theatre venue in the UK.

But by the start of 1968, the group began fragmenting as a result of personal and musical differences. Wayne grew frustrated with the Move's management pushing Wood to the forefront of the band and himself to the background by encouraging Wood to write the Move's songs and allowing the Move to record songs which Wayne did not sing lead on. According to Wood, the management were indifferent to who sang lead, an indifference that proved justified after the Wood-sung "Fire Brigade" and "Blackberry Way" became two of the Move's biggest hits. When the management decided that Wood would be the producer for the band's second album, Shazam, Wayne pushed back, becoming a co-producer on Shazam and choosing many of the cover songs which appeared on it. Wayne's increasingly MOR style, and aspirations towards cabaret, were at odds with Wood's desire to experiment in a more progressive and classical direction, which would lead to the foundation of the Electric Light Orchestra (ELO). Wayne was initially offered to play timpani for ELO, but rejected the offer. Wayne left the band shortly after the band's sole tour of the United States.

=== Solo performing and acting ===
He went solo and made several singles and record albums, some including songs written and produced by Roy Wood. Among his singles were "Way Back in the Fifties", "Hi Summer" backed with "My Girl And Me", both written and produced by Lynsey de Paul, the theme song to an ITV variety series he co-hosted, "Maybe God's Got Something Up His Sleeve", the John Lennon song "Imagine", plus a cover version of the Cliff Richard hit "Miss You Nights", and Wood's "Aerial Pictures". He was originally offered the chance to record "Sugar Baby Love" but rejected it as "rubbish"; it was promptly given to a new band, the Rubettes, and it launched their career with a number-one hit. As well as "Hi Summer", his work on television included singing the theme songs to the talent show New Faces, one of which, "You're a Star!", was a minor hit for him in 1973. In 1977, Wayne took part in the Song for Europe contest, hoping to represent the UK in the Eurovision Song Contest. His song, "A Little Give, A Little Take", finished in 11th place out of twelve songs.

Wayne also made a few recordings with ELO as guest vocalist, though these remained unreleased until they appeared as bonus tracks on a remastered re-issue of the group's second album, ELO 2, in 2003. He never made the charts after leaving the Move, but still enjoyed a steady career in cabaret and on television, recording versions of songs from the shows of Andrew Lloyd Webber and Tim Rice, as well as voiceovers and jingles. He sang backing vocals on Mike Oldfield's Earth Moving, released in 1989.

In his acting career he had a small role in the Birmingham-based soap opera Crossroads, and in 1974 married Susan Hanson, another member of the cast. His most acclaimed stage role was as the narrator in Willy Russell's Blood Brothers between 1990 and 1996. Later he became a presenter on BBC Radio WM, in the course of which he interviewed several of his former colleagues from the Move, among other guests. He was a fund raiser for leukaemia research, and ran the London Marathon several times for charity. He made an appearance on The Benny Hill Show in 1985, in which he played the "Face" character in a parody of The A-Team. From 1983 to 1988 he appeared in various Emu TV programmes, in the segment Boggles Kingdom alongside Susan Maughan and Rod Hull. The segment revolved around Rod's ancestor, King Boggle, his sister Princess Hortensia, and servant Odd Job John played by Wayne, who were trapped in medieval times. Wayne performed several songs during the show, including renditions of "Puttin' On the Ritz" and "Greensleeves".

Carl was also a guest singer with Spike Edney's SAS Band.

== With the Hollies and death ==
In 2000, on the retirement of lead vocalist Allan Clarke, he joined the Hollies, touring Europe and Australasia with them, as well as playing venues all over the United Kingdom. They recorded a new song, "How Do I Survive", in February 2003, which appeared as the only previously unreleased item on a 46-track compilation CD of the Hollies' greatest hits later that year. In addition to most of the Hollies' songs, they included "Flowers in the Rain" and "Blackberry Way" in their live repertoire. Their drummer Bobby Elliott described him as "a fearless performer and powerhouse singer".

Wayne played what turned out to be his last concert with the group on 10 July 2004 at Egersund, Norway. Shortly afterwards he was admitted to hospital for tests; he was diagnosed with oesophageal cancer and died a few weeks later at age 61. He left a widow, (Susan Hanson), and their son Jack.

Because of poor sales, none of Wayne's solo releases remained on catalogue for long during his lifetime. In 2006 an album of his performances, remastered with the involvement of Wood and some previously unreleased, was issued under the title Songs From The Wood And Beyond 1973–2003. Two tracks by Wayne and Choral Union appear on the two-CD set Friends & Relatives, a compilation of tracks by Electric Light Orchestra and associated acts.
