= Tony Secunda =

- Birth name: Anthony Michael Secunda
- Born: 24 August 1940; Epsom, Surrey, England
- Died: 12 February 1995 (aged 54); Tiburon, California, United States
- Genres: Pop; rock
- Occupations: Manager; music publisher
- Years active: Early 1960s–1995
- Labels: Various

Anthony Michael Secunda (24 August 1940 – 12 February 1995) was an English manager of rock groups in the 1960s and 1970s, including the Moody Blues, Procol Harum, the Move, and T. Rex, Motörhead, Steeleye Span, Marianne Faithfull and the Pretenders.

== Life and career ==
Secunda was born in Epsom, Surrey. According to Carl Wayne, the Move's vocalist, Secunda's business acumen and flair for publicity were a major factor in the group's success. "He dreamed up all the ideas, the stunts and the clothing – sending Blackberry pies with bottles of champagne for "Blackberry Way", doing a photo session at the fire station in Birmingham for "Fire Brigade" – and of course the Harold Wilson affair!"

The latter referred to Secunda's most controversial stunt, in which a cartoon postcard promoting the band's 1967 single, "Flowers in the Rain", featured a libellous drawing of Wilson, who was the Prime Minister at the time. Wilson sued the band and management. Wilson won the case and as part of the settlement the band had to relinquish all royalties in respect of the record to a charity of Wilson's choice – a ruling which they tried unsuccessfully to overturn after Wilson's death in 1995. The Move were unnerved by the experience, and fired Secunda as their manager shortly afterwards.

In 1969 Secunda helped organize and finance the band Balls with Trevor Burton (formerly of the Move) and singer Denny Laine from the Moody Blues. The group was not successful.

In 1971, he became manager of T. Rex and helped Marc Bolan to set up his own record label, T. Rex Wax Co, through EMI. After parting company with Bolan, he managed Steve Peregrin Took, Bolan's former musical partner, Steeleye Span, Motörhead, and Marianne Faithfull; the latter a short run experience which ended with a cash payoff, after Faithfull decided his management style was not suited to her needs. Secunda discovered Chrissie Hynde and placed her on a retainer, so she could leave her day job and concentrate on writing music.

In the mid 1980s, Secunda moved to San Anselmo, California, where he remained active in music publishing and promotion, and developed an interest in the ecology and green issues. He started a literary agency in Tiburon, California, publishing the biographies of bands and musicians, where he died of a heart attack on 12 February 1995, at the age of 54.
