= Denny Cordell =

English record producer (1943–1995)

- Born: Dennis Cordell-Lavarack; 1 August 1943; Buenos Aires, Argentina
- Died: 18 February 1995 (aged 51) Dublin, Ireland
- Genres: Rock
- Occupation: Record producer

Dennis Cordell-Lavarack (1 August 1943 – 18 February 1995), known as Denny Cordell, was an English record producer. He is notable for his mid-1960s and early 1970s productions of hit singles for The Moody Blues, Leon Russell, The Move, Procol Harum, Joe Cocker and Tom Petty and the Heartbreakers. He later became a racehorse trainer.

== Early life and career ==
Born in Buenos Aires, Argentina, Cordell grew up in England and was educated at Cranleigh School.

He met Chris Blackwell when he was aged twenty-one, and started to work for Blackwell's label, Island Records, as a producer. When Cordell started to work more closely with The Moody Blues, he decided to leave Island and become an independent producer.

Cordell produced the Moody Blues' debut album The Magnificent Moodies on the Decca record label in 1965. The record contained the hit "Go Now" (produced separately by Alex Wharton), which had been a number one hit on the UK Singles Chart earlier in the year. This was followed up with hits for Cordell producing The Move, Georgie Fame, Procol Harum and Joe Cocker (all but Fame were Essex/Straight Ahead Productions artists). On the back of his success with Procol Harum's "A Whiter Shade of Pale" and Joe Cocker's "With a Little Help From My Friends", Cordell moved his operation to Los Angeles and started Shelter Records, with session piano player Leon Russell. A second Shelter Records location opened in Tulsa, Oklahoma, at The Church Studio, an old church turned into a recording studio by Leon Russell now owned by American businesswoman Teresa Knox.

He enjoyed success with Shelter, signing J.J. Cale, Phoebe Snow, Leon Russell, the Grease Band, Tom Petty and the Heartbreakers, and the Dwight Twilley Band among others. He is also known as an early mentor of Tony Visconti. Cordell's relationship with Tom Petty and Heartbreakers is described in detail in Mike Campbell's book / audiobook, "Heartbreaker: A Memoir".

Cordell is also credited with issuing the Wailers / Bob Marley and the Wailers first US single, "Duppy Conqueror", in October 1971 and is seen as instrumental in the group signing to Island Records.

In the late 1970s he started the Flippers roller skating boogie palace in Los Angeles, California. In the 1980s he turned to his other interest, horseracing, but in the 1990s he took up producing records again, and once more worked for Island. Among others he helped produce The Cranberries, who wrote a song in his tribute called "Cordell" (1996), and Melissa Etheridge's album Yes I Am.

== Death ==
Cordell died in February 1995 in Dublin, Ireland from lymphoma at the age of 51.

== Legacy ==
He was the father of the musicians Tarka Cordell, and Milo Cordell of the band The Big Pink. A horse race, the Denny Cordell Lavarack Fillies Stakes, is run annually in Cordell's memory at Gowran Park Racecourse, where he saddled his first winner as a racehorse trainer.

== See also ==
- Regal Zonophone Records
- Fly Records
- Shelter Records
- Island Records
