= Bev Bevan =

British drummer (born 1944)

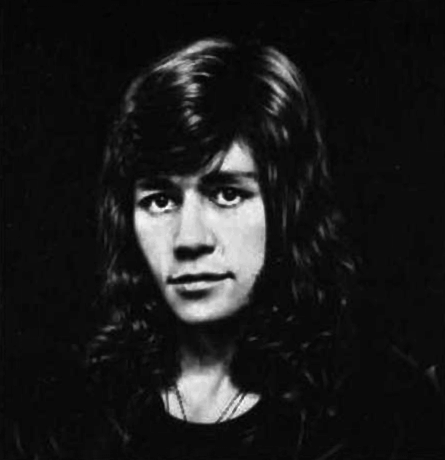
- Bevan in 1977

Background information
- Born: Beverley Bevan; 25 November 1944 (age 81); Birmingham, Warwickshire, England
- Genres: Rock
- Occupation: Drummer
- Years active: 1957–present
- Member of: Bev Bevan Band
- Formerly of: Denny Laine and The Diplomats; The Move; Electric Light Orchestra; Black Sabbath; ELO Part II; Bev Bevan's Move
- Website: Musical career

Beverley "Bev" Bevan (born 25 November 1944) is an English rock musician who was the drummer and one of the original members of the Move and Electric Light Orchestra (ELO). After the end of ELO in 1986, he founded ELO Part II.

Bevan also was a drummer for Black Sabbath during the Born Again Tour, and later played percussion on The Eternal Idol in 1987. Bevan was inducted into the Rock and Roll Hall of Fame in 2017 as a member of Electric Light Orchestra.

== Early years and education ==
Bevan was born in South Yardley, Birmingham. His father Charles used to play drums and was nicknamed Bev, which is how Bevan got his name. Charles died when Bev was 11 years old. After attending Moseley Grammar School, where he gained two O level passes, he worked as a trainee buyer in a city-centre department store called The Beehive with school friend Jasper Carrott (Robert Davis).

== Career ==
=== The Move ===
His professional music career started with a stint with Denny Laine in his group Denny Laine and the Diplomats, then with Carl Wayne & the Vikings, followed by the Move in 1966. The Move was known for being the boost to fame for Roy Wood. The Move's highest-selling songs are "Fire Brigade" and "Blackberry Way".

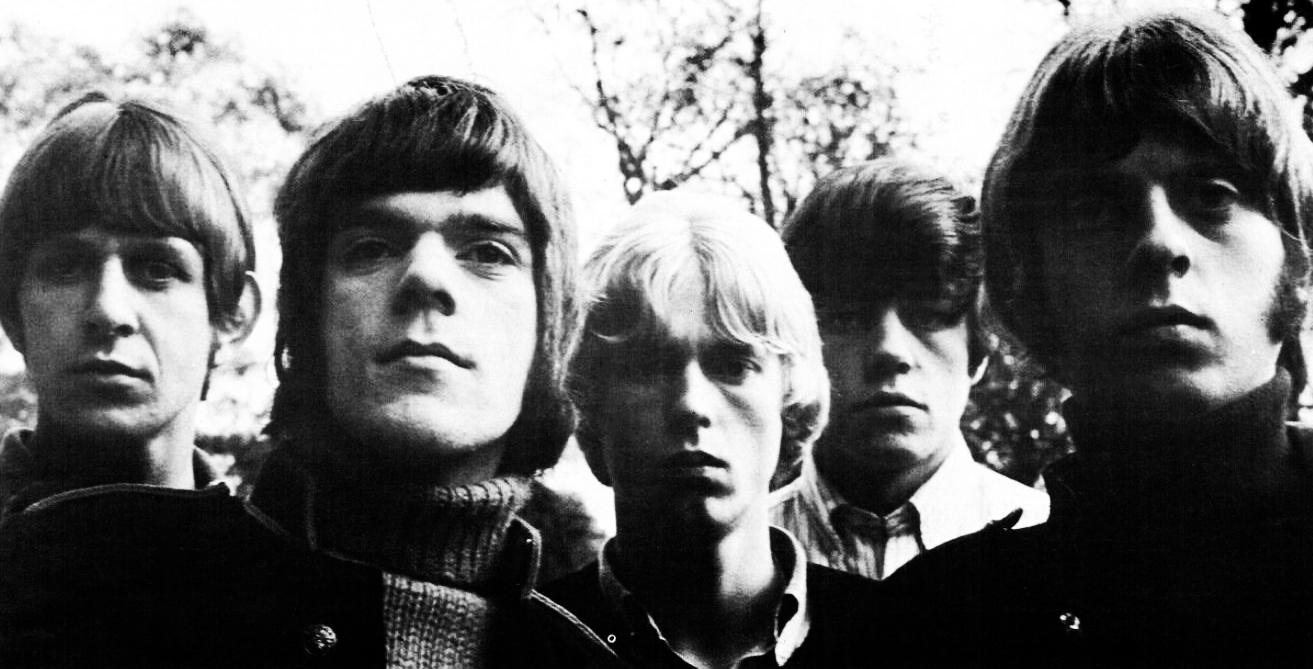
The Move in 1967: from left to right, Carl Wayne, Roy Wood, Ace Kefford, Bev Bevan and Trevor Burton

Bevan has a deep singing voice. With the Move he sang lead on a remake of "Zing! Went the Strings of My Heart" and the country and western spoof, "Ben Crawley Steel Co". He composed one Move song: "Don't Mess Me Up", an Elvis Presley spoof from the album Message from the Country, which was also the B-side of the Move's single "Tonight". He is also credited with writing the rock-blues "Turkish Tram Conductor Blues" on Looking On: Roy Wood actually composed the song, but gave the songwriting credit to Bevan as a reward for his promotional efforts on behalf of the band.

They released their final single, "California Man", in 1972.

==== Bev Bevan's Move ====
After Carl Wayne died in 2004, the drummer formed Bev Bevan's Move with Phil Tree and former ELO Part II colleagues Phil Bates and Neil Lockwood, to play a set comprising mostly Move classics on tour. Bates left in July 2007 to re-join ELO Part II, by then renamed to The Orchestra. Bevan was then joined by former Move guitarist Trevor Burton.

=== Electric Light Orchestra ===
The Move’s spinoff, Electric Light Orchestra, was formed by Bevan, Wood, and Jeff Lynne in 1970. They released their first album in 1971, by which time the Move existed only as a recording outfit.

Among ELO's output, Bevan's distinct baritone vocals can be heard most prominently on "Fire On High" and "Strange Magic", both from the album Face the Music (1975).

Bevan recorded a solo single in 1976, a cover of the Sandy Nelson instrumental "Let There Be Drums". Bevan played on all Electric Light Orchestra and ELO Part II albums up to 1999. In 1980 he published a historical memoir of the Electric Light Orchestra. In 1982, Bevan played drums on the solo album released by ELO bassist and co-vocalist Kelly Groucutt.

=== Black Sabbath ===
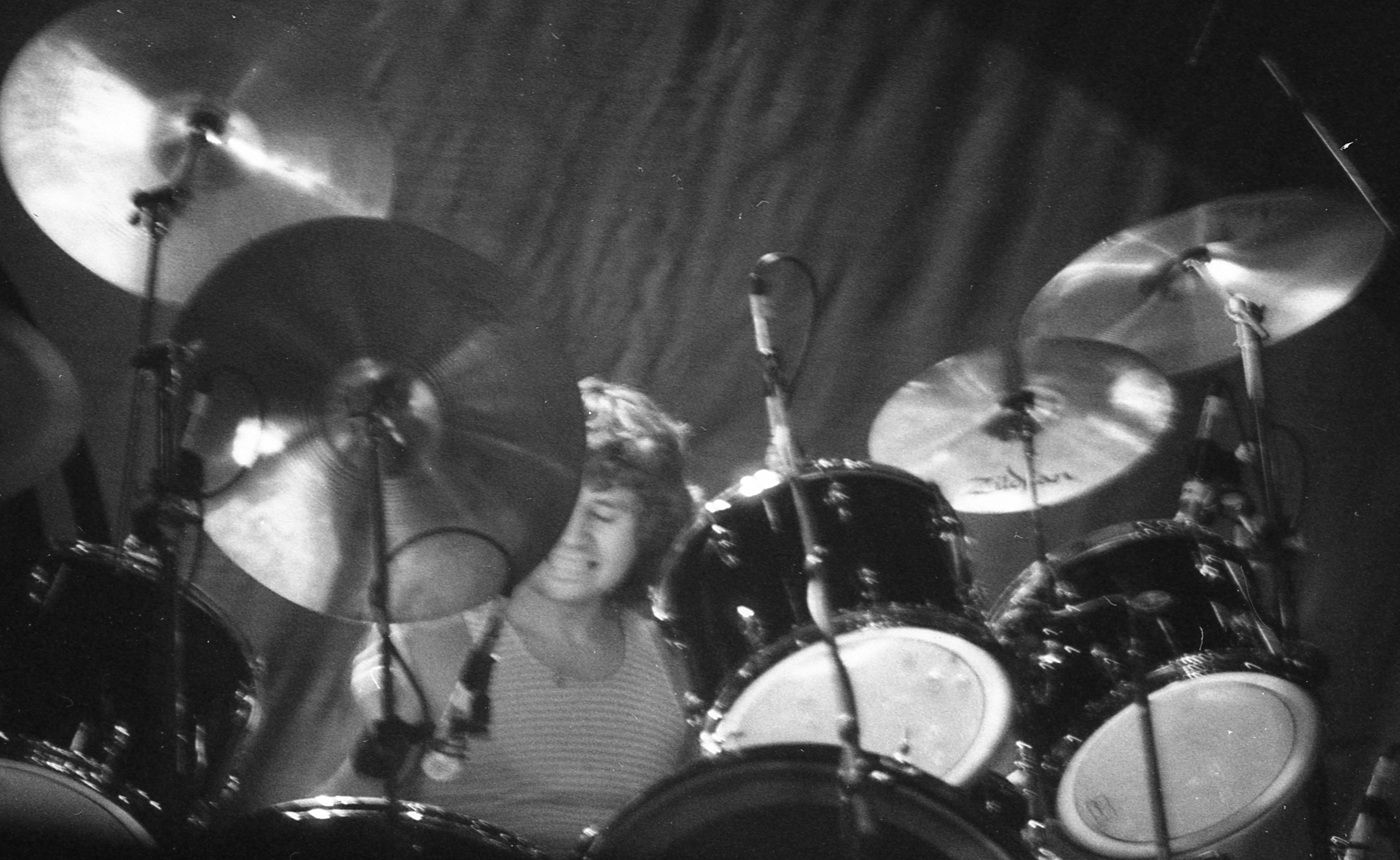
Bevan performing with Black Sabbath in 1983

In 1983, he replaced Bill Ward in Black Sabbath for the Born Again Tour. He also appeared in Sabbath's videos "Trashed" and "Zero the Hero". A headlining appearance at the 1983 Reading Festival – extracts of which appear on a reissue of Born Again – was only Bevan's second gig with the band. "It was just all over the shop", recalled guitarist Tony Iommi. "Bev didn't know [the songs] at all. He did try. As we went on the tour, he did get a lot better… We went to America and he done good. That particular stage, doing the Reading Festival, was a definite wrong for us."

Bevan rejoined Black Sabbath briefly in 1987, recording percussion overdubs for the album The Eternal Idol, but was replaced by Terry Chimes after refusing to play shows in South Africa, which was at the time under apartheid rule.

=== Later works ===
Bevan appeared on Paul Weller's 2010 album Wake Up The Nation and played drums on two songs: "Moonshine" and "Wake Up The Nation". Weller told him that he was his second choice; his first choice would have been Keith Moon.

Bevan formerly presented a radio show on BBC Radio WM on Sunday afternoons. He also reviews records for the Midlands newspaper Sunday Mercury and has a blog on its website. It was announced at the Best of Broad Street Awards on 17 January 2011 that Bevan would be honoured with a star on the Birmingham Walk of Stars.

Bevan is also a patron of the Dorridge Music School (Knowle). In 2012, Bevan narrated the audiobook version of Tony Iommi's biography Iron Man – My Journey Through Heaven and Hell. Bevan's 2014 calendar contained 102 gigs in 11 months, some of which formed the final gigs for the Move.

In 2014, Bevan joined Quill, a Birmingham-based band.

As of 2022, the Bev Bevan Band had played gigs with Bev's former school mate Jasper Carrott under the name "Stand Up and Rock" since 2017.

== Personal life ==
Bevan is a supporter of Championship club Wolverhampton Wanderers FC.

Bevan's first wife was Valerie Taylor; a son was born in 1981. On 1 September 2022, Bev married Joy Brain (nee Strachan), his bandmate in Quill.

== Bibliography ==
- Bevan, Bev (1980). Pearce, Garth (ed.). The Electric Light Orchestra Story. Mushroom Books. ISBN 0-907394-01-9.
