= Regal Zonophone Records =

UK record label

Regal Zonophone
- The 1967–75 logo
- Parent company: Universal Music Group (Australia and New Zealand); Warner Music Group (outside Australia and New Zealand)
- Founded: 1932; 94 years ago
- Status: Defunct
- Distributors: EMI Recorded Music Australia (in Australia); Universal Music New Zealand (in New Zealand); Parlophone Records (outside Australia and New Zealand)
- Country of origin: United Kingdom

Regal Zonophone Records was a British record label formed in 1932, through a merger of the Regal and Zonophone labels. This followed the merger of those labels' respective parent companies – the Columbia Graphophone Company and the Gramophone Company – to form EMI. At the merger, those records from the Regal Records catalogue were prefixed 'MR' and those from the Zonophone Records catalogue were prefixed 'T'. Record releases after the merger continued using only the 'MR' prefix.

== History ==
Originally Regal Zonophone handled American releases from Okeh Records, Victor Records and Columbia Records, as well as offering home-grown recordings by artists such as Reginald Dixon, Joe Loss, Gracie Fields and George Formby. The label is also known for its releases of Salvation Army (particularly brass band) music.

In the 1950s, the Australian division of Regal Zonophone played an important role in the emerging Australian country music genre, signing several emerging country stars including Slim Dusty, Smoky Dawson, Reg Lindsay and Chad Morgan. Slim Dusty's 1957 Regal Zonophone hit "A Pub with No Beer" became the biggest-selling Australian recording ever released up to that time - and as such, remains for perpetuity the biggest selling 78 ever in Australia.

EMI revived the Regal Zonophone imprint in 1967 to handle the Essex Music/Straight Ahead producing account that had moved from Deram (after one Procol Harum single and two singles by The Move) and continued well into the early 1970s, with successful producers Denny Cordell and Tony Visconti both having production companies releasing records through the label. During this period the label had both album and single success with artists such as The Move, Procol Harum, Joe Cocker, and Tyrannosaurus Rex. During the mid-1970s, many of these production deals ended and, despite a few sporadic releases by Blue Mink, Geordie, Dave Edmunds, and Grunt Futtock (a one-off project featuring Roy Wood, Steve Marriott, Peter Frampton and Andy Bown), EMI stopped using the imprint as a major pop label. Many of the label's artists moved to Fly Records or to the EMI imprint.

Regal Zonophone was revived by EMI in 1985–86 for Frank Sidebottom, and again at the end of the 1990s as a reissue label curated by the UK band Saint Etienne. This incarnation of the label is no longer active, as EMI relaunched Regal and Zonophone as separate imprints of Parlophone. In 2013, both Regal and Zonophone were taken over by Warner Music Group after Universal Music Group spun off Parlophone from EMI, at the request of international regulators.

However, the Australian and New Zealand Regal Zonophone catalogues, including recordings by Slim Dusty, were ceded to Universal Music Australia's imprint EMI Recorded Music and Universal Music New Zealand respectively.

== Other information ==
- Regal Zonophone is one of the few record labels commemorated in song, namely "Magdalene (My Regal Zonophone)" from the album Shine On Brightly by Regal Zonophone artists Procol Harum, and mentioned in "Repetition" by the Fall.
- Regal Zonophone originally released Thrillington, a 1977 album produced by Paul McCartney, under the pseudonym of Percy "Thrills" Thrillington.

== See also ==
- List of record labels
