= Three Light Years =

Box set by Electric Light Orchestra
- Released: December 1978
- Recorded: 1973–1975
- Genre: Progressive rock
- Label: Jet Records
- Producer: Jeff Lynne

Electric Light Orchestra chronology
Out of the Blue (1977)	Three Light Years (1978)	The Light Shines On Vol 2 (1979)

Professional ratings
Review scores
Source	Rating
Encyclopedia of Popular Music	3/5 stars

Three Light Years is a box set of three studio albums by Electric Light Orchestra (ELO). It was released in December 1978 and reached number 38 on the UK Albums Chart.

== Contents ==
With the first two ELO albums anthologized by the Harvest compilations The Light Shines On (1977) and The Light Shines On Vol 2 (1978), Three Light Years compiled the subsequent three albums in their entirety: On the Third Day (1973), Eldorado - A Symphony by the Electric Light Orchestra (1974) and Face the Music (1975). None of these albums had charted on their own when first released, and so this box set represents their only chart appearances in the UK. The title itself reflects the name of the band, the number of albums featured, and the three years the collection covers.

Housed in a blue cardboard box, the three vinyl albums came in transparent plastic sleeves with the band logo printed in a pattern on the front. The label on the A-side of each record was a picture of the original cover, with a standard Jet Records label on the B-side. Although On the Third Day was the original eight-track British version (and thus left off "Showdown"), the US sleeve was shown.

Also included in the box was a booklet of lyrics, credits and photographs, and a promotional insert with details of the official fan club and an apparel offer. The booklet of lyrics (as printed in England by Delga Press Ltd.) consisted of 12 pages, if the front (outer and inner) and rear (outer and inner) covers are counted. Within the covers are 8 pages of lyrics, inter-dispersed with photographs of the band. It would appear the intention was to list the track lyrics of the 3 albums in chronological order; On the Third Day - Side A then B, Eldorado - Side A then B, followed by Face the Music - Side A then B. However, there is notable error in all? or just UK copies of the booklet? On the 2nd page of lyrics for Side B of On the Third Day, the tracks are listed out of order, with lyrics for the Dreaming of 4000 track preceding those for Ma-Ma-Ma Belle. These tracks consistently feature on the vinyl and its label in the opposite order.

== Track listing ==
All songs are written by Jeff Lynne, except where noted.

=== On the Third Day ===
Side one
No.	Title	Length
1.	"Ocean Breakup/King of the Universe"	4:07
2.	"Bluebird is Dead"	4:24
3.	"Oh No Not Susan"	3:07
4.	"New World Rising/Ocean Breakup (Reprise)"	4:05

Side two
No.	Title	Writer(s)	Length
6.	"Daybreaker"		3:51
7.	"Ma-Ma-Ma Belle"		3:56
8.	"Dreaming of 4000"		5:04
9.	"In the Hall of the Mountain King"	Edvard Grieg	6:37
Total length:			35:11

=== Eldorado ===
Side three
No.	Title	Length
1.	"Eldorado Overture" (instrumental)	2:12
2.	"Can't Get It Out of My Head"	4:21
3.	"Boy Blue"	5:18
4.	"Laredo Tornado"	5:29
5.	"Poor Boy (The Greenwood)"	2:57

Side four
No.	Title	Length
6.	"Mister Kingdom"	5:50
7.	"Nobody's Child"	3:40
8.	"Illusions in G Major"	2:36
9.	"Eldorado"	5:20
10.	"Eldorado Finale"	1:20
Total length:		39:03

=== Face the Music ===
Side five
No.	Title	Length
1.	"Fire On High"	5:29
2.	"Waterfall"	4:27
3.	"Evil Woman"	4:17
4.	"Nightrider"	4:22

Side six
No.	Title	Length
5.	"Poker"	3:31
6.	"Strange Magic"	4:29
7.	"Down Home Town"	3:54
8.	"One Summer Dream"	5:47
Total length:		36:16

== Charts ==
Chart (1979)	Peak position
UK Albums (OCC)	38

== Certifications ==
Region	Certification	Certified units/sales
United Kingdom (BPI)	Gold	100,000^{^}
^{^} Shipments figures based on certification alone.

== See also ==
- Four Light Years
