= Olé ELO =

Greatest hits album by Electric Light Orchestra
- Released: June 1976
- Recorded: 1971–75
- Genres: Progressive rock, art rock
- Length: 49:22 (US United Artists original pressing); 43:49 (subsequent issues)
- Labels: United Artists, Columbia/Jet
- Producers: Jeff Lynne (all tracks), Roy Wood (track 1)

Electric Light Orchestra chronology
Face the Music (1975)	Olé ELO (1976)	A New World Record (1976)

Professional ratings
Review scores
Source	Rating
AllMusic	4.5/5 stars
Encyclopedia of Popular Music	3/5 stars
MusicHound	3/5
The Rolling Stone Album Guide	3/5 stars

Olé ELO is a compilation album by the Electric Light Orchestra (ELO) covering their early years. Released in 1976, this LP was originally compiled by United Artists Records as a promotional album for American radio stations, but when copies of the LP started selling to fans "underground" United Artists decided to release it in the US to capitalize on the band's growing popularity.

== Track listing ==
Original US United Artists pressings of the album contained the full-length versions of "Kuiama" and "Roll Over Beethoven", as included in the album Electric Light Orchestra II. Original promotional copies were pressed on gold vinyl. An extremely limited run of white, blue & red vinyl promotional pressings was also made. Later US releases and CBS/Jet reissues have included edited versions of these two songs. "Kuiama" was shortened to 9:08, and the single edit of "Roll Over Beethoven" was used, which was 4:31.

Side one

#	Title	Writer	Album	Length
1	"10538 Overture"	Jeff Lynne	The Electric Light Orchestra (1971), issued in the US in 1972 under the title No Answer	5:25
2	"Kuiama"	Jeff Lynne	ELO 2 (1973)	11:10
3	"Roll Over Beethoven"	Chuck Berry / Ludwig van Beethoven	ELO 2 (1973)	8:02

Side two

#	Title	Writer	Album	Length
1	"Showdown"	Jeff Lynne	1973 non-album single, later included in the US version of the album On the Third Day (1973)	4:12
2	"Ma-Ma-Ma Belle"	Jeff Lynne	On the Third Day (1973)	3:35
3	"Can't Get It Out of My Head"	Jeff Lynne	Eldorado (1974)	4:26
4	"Boy Blue"	Jeff Lynne	Single edit; full version included on Eldorado (1974)	4:12
5	"Evil Woman"	Jeff Lynne	Face the Music (1975)	4:15
6	"Strange Magic"	Jeff Lynne	Face the Music (1975)	4:05

== Charts ==
Chart (1976)	Peak position
Canada Top Albums/CDs (RPM)	64
US Billboard 200	32
US CashBox Top 100 Albums	24

== Certifications ==
Region	Certification	Certified units/sales
Canada (Music Canada)	Platinum	100,000^{^}
United States (RIAA)	Gold	500,000^{^}
^{^} Shipments figures based on certification alone.
