= Backmasking =

Backward recording technique

Backmasking is a recording technique in which a message is recorded backward onto a track that is meant to be played forward. It is a deliberate process, whereas a message found through phonetic reversal may be unintentional.

Artists have used backmasking for artistic, comedic and satiric effect, on both analogue and digital recordings. It has also been used to censor words or phrases for clean releases of explicit songs.

In 1969, rumors of a backmasked message in the Beatles song "Revolution 9" fueled the "Paul is dead" urban legend. Since at least the early 1980s, Christian groups in the United States alleged that backmasking was being used by prominent rock musicians for Satanic purposes, leading to record-burning protests and proposed anti-backmasking legislation by state and federal governments during the 1980s, as part of the Satanic panic movement of the time.

Many popular musicians were accused of including backmasked messages in their music. However, apparent backmasked messages may in fact be examples of pareidolia (the brain's tendency to recognize patterns in meaningless data), coincidental phonetic reversal, or as deliberate responses to the allegations themselves.

== History ==
=== Development ===
The backwards playing of records was advised as training for magicians by occultist Aleister Crowley, who suggested in his 1913 book Magick (Book 4) that an adept "train himself to think backwards by external means", one of which was to "listen to phonograph records, reversed". In the movie Gold Diggers of 1935, the end of the dancing-pianos musical number, "The Words Are in My Heart," is filmed in reverse motion, with the accompanying instrumental score incidentally being reversed.

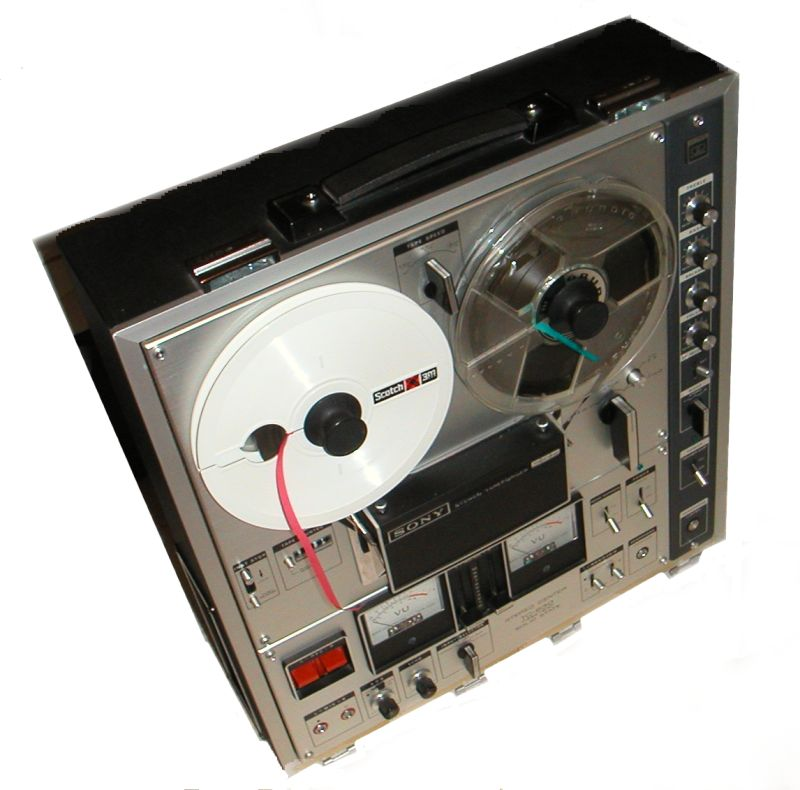
Tape recorders allow backward recording in recording studios.

In 1959, a vocal group called The Eligibles released a record called "Car Trouble", which contains two nonsense passages. When reversed, they reveal the phrases "And you can get my daughter back by 10:30, you bum!" and (perhaps inevitably) "Now, lookit here, cats, stop running these records backwards!" Peaking at #107 on the Billboard magazine charts that summer, "Car Trouble" is believed to be the first hit record to contain backmasking.

The Beatles, which began incorporating musique concrète-inspired tape manipulation techniques into their recordings in the mid-1960s, were responsible for popularizing the concept of backmasking. Singer John Lennon and producer George Martin both claimed that they had discovered the backwards recording technique during the recording of 1966's Revolver (specifically the album tracks "Tomorrow Never Knows" and "I'm Only Sleeping") and the single "Rain". Lennon stated that, while under the influence of marijuana, he accidentally played "Rain" in reverse and enjoyed the sound. After sharing the results with the other Beatles, the effect was used on tape loops and the guitar solo on "Tomorrow Never Knows" and later on Lennon's vocals in the coda of "Rain". According to Martin, the band had been experimenting with changing the speeds of and reversing the "Tomorrow Never Knows" tapes, and Martin got the idea of reversing Lennon's vocals and guitar, which he did with a clip from "Rain". Lennon then liked the effect and kept it. "Rain" was the first Beatles song to feature a backmasked message: "Sunshine... Rain... When the rain comes, they run and hide their heads" (the last line is the first line of the song in reverse).

=== Controversies ===
The Beatles were involved in the spread of backmasking both as a recording technique and as the center of a controversy. The latter has its roots in an event in 1969, when WKNR-FM DJ Russ Gibb received a phone call from a student at Eastern Michigan University who identified himself as "Tom". The caller asked Gibb about a rumor that Beatle Paul McCartney had died, and claimed that the Beatles song "Revolution 9" contained a backward message confirming the rumor. Gibb played the song backwards on his turntable, and heard the phrase "turn me on, dead man". Gibb began telling his listeners about what he called "The Great Cover-up", and listeners cited other alleged backmasked phrases, including "Paul is a dead man, miss him, miss him, miss him", on "I'm So Tired".

The "Paul is dead" rumor popularized the idea of backmasking in popular music. After Gibb's show, many more songs were found to contain phrases that sounded like known spoken languages when reversed. Initially, the search was done mostly by fans of rock music. In the late 1970s, during the rise of the Christian right in the United States, fundamentalist Christian groups began to claim that backmasked messages could bypass the conscious mind and reach the unconscious mind, where they would be accepted subliminally by the listener. In 1981, Christian DJ Michael Mills began stating on Christian radio programs that Led Zeppelin's "Stairway to Heaven" contained hidden Satanic messages that were heard by the unconscious.

In 1982, the Trinity Broadcasting Network's Paul Crouch hosted a show with self-described neuroscientist William Yarroll, who argued that rock stars were cooperating with the Church of Satan to place backmasked messages on records, and fundamentalist Christian pastor Gary Greenwald held public lectures on dangers of backmasking and at least one mass record-smashing event. During the same year, thirty North Carolina teenagers, led by their pastor, claimed that singers had been possessed by Satan, who used their voices to create backward messages, and held a record-burning at their church.

Allegations of demonic backmasking were also made by social psychologists, parents, and critics of rock music, as well as the Parents Music Resource Center, which accused Led Zeppelin of using backmasking to promote Satanism.

=== Legislation ===
One result of the furor was the firing of five radio DJs who had encouraged listeners to search for backward messages in their record collections. A more serious consequence was legislation by the state governments of Arkansas and California. The 1983 California bill was introduced to prevent backmasking that "can manipulate our behavior without our knowledge or consent and turn us into disciples of the Antichrist". Involved in the discussion on the bill was a California State Assembly Consumer Protection and Toxic Materials Committee hearing, during which "Stairway to Heaven" was played backwards, and William Yaroll testified. The successful bill made the distribution of records with undeclared backmasking an invasion of privacy for which the distributor could be sued. The Arkansas law, which referenced albums by the Beatles, Pink Floyd, Electric Light Orchestra, Queen and Styx, and mandated that records with backmasking include a warning sticker, passed unanimously in 1983, but was vetoed by Bill Clinton and failed a second vote to override his veto. United States House Resolution 6363, introduced in 1982 by Representative Bob Dornan, proposed mandating a similar label federally; the bill was referred to the Subcommittee on Commerce, Transportation and Tourism and never passed. Government action was also called for in the legislatures of Texas and Canada.

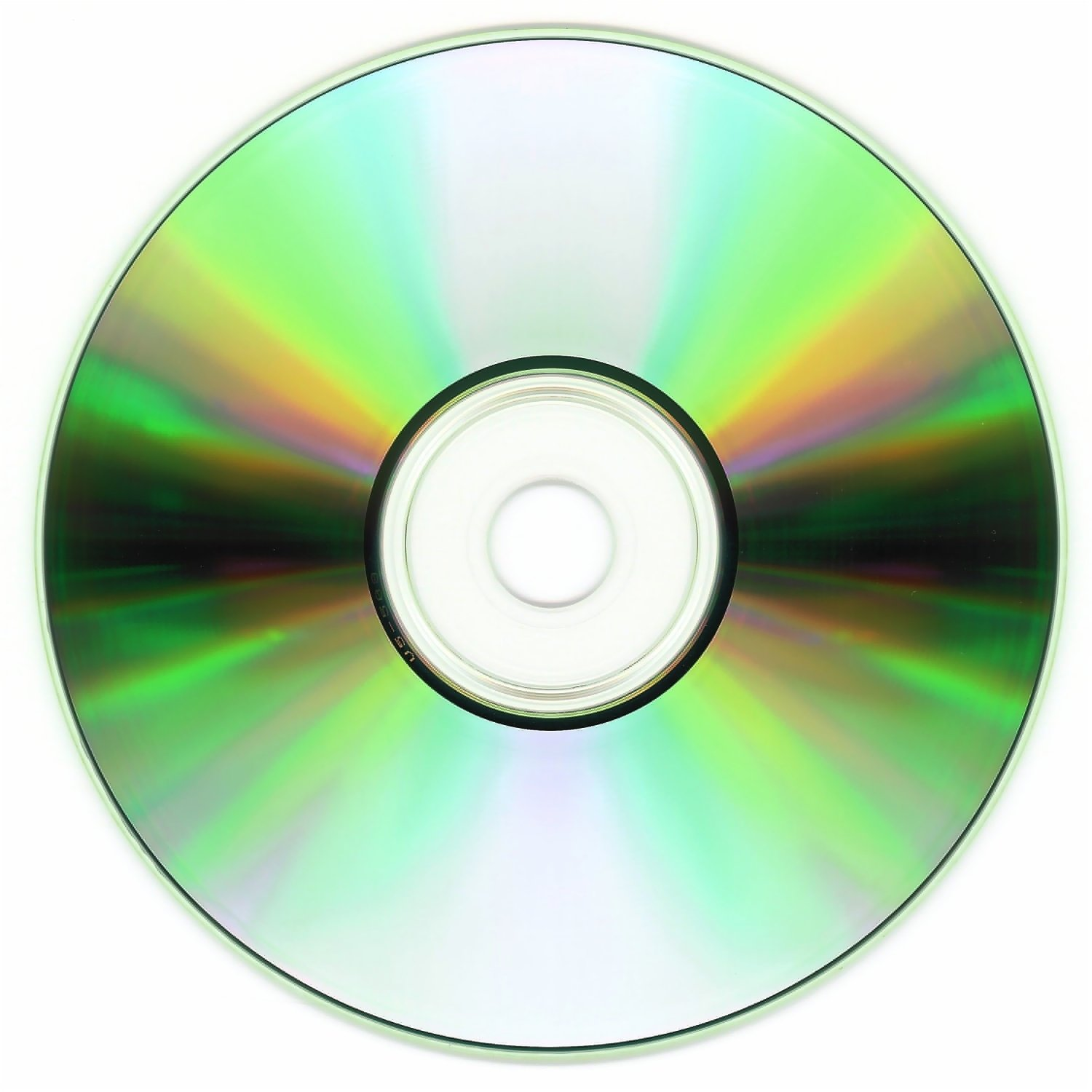
The compact disc made finding backward messages difficult, causing interest in backmasking to decline.

With the advent of compact discs in the 1980s, but prior to the advent of sound editing technology for personal computers in the 1990s, it became more difficult to listen to recordings backwards, and the controversy died down.

=== Resurgence ===
Although the backmasking controversy peaked in the 1980s, the general belief in subliminal manipulation became more widespread in the United States during the following decade, with belief in Satanic backmasking on records persisting into the 1990s. At the same time, the development of sound editing software with audio reversal features simplified the process of reversing audio, which previously could only be done with full fidelity using a professional tape recorder. The Sound Recorder utility, included with Microsoft Windows from Windows 95 to Windows XP, allows one-click audio reversal, as does popular open source sound editing software Audacity. Following the growth of the Internet, backmasked message searchers used such software to create websites featuring backward music samples, which became a widely used method of exploring backmasking in popular music.

In January 2014, the first backmasked video was released as part of a Grammy Awards promotional campaign. A customized video player allowed the user to watch a piece of film accompanied by a music soundtrack both forwards and backwards. The backwards content contained a hidden visual story and the words 'music unleashes you' embedded into the reversed audio track.

== Use ==
Backmasking has been used as a recording technique since the 1960s. In the era of magnetic tape sound recording, backmasking required that the source reel-to-reel tape actually be played backwards, which was achieved by first being wound onto the original takeup reel, then reversing the reels so as to use that reel as the source (this would reverse the stereo channels as well).

Backmasked words are unintelligible when played forward, but when played backwards are clear speech. Listening to backmasked audio with most turntables requires disengaging the drive and rotating the album by hand in reverse (though some can play records backwards). With magnetic tape, the tape must be reversed and spliced back into the cassette. Compact discs were difficult to reverse when first introduced, but digital audio editors, which were first introduced in the late 1980s and became popular during the next decade, allow easy reversal of audio from digital sources.

=== Film and television ===
In the I Love Lucy episode "Home Movies", Lucy makes an audition film that features clips that are played backwards.

In the 1973 film The Exorcist, a tape of noises from the possessed victim was discovered to contain a message when the tape was played backwards. This scene might have inspired subsequent copycat musical effects. Stanley Kubrick used "Masked Ball", an adaptation by Jocelyn Pook of her earlier work "Backwards Priests" (from the album Flood) featuring reversed Romanian chanting, as the background music for the masquerade ball scene in Eyes Wide Shut.

Backmasking was also parodied in a 2001 episode of the television series The Simpsons titled "New Kids on the Blecch". Bart Simpson joins a boy band called the Party Posse, whose song "Drop da Bomb" includes the repeated lyric "Yvan eht nioj". Lisa Simpson becomes suspicious and plays the song backward, revealing the backmasked message "Join the Navy", which leads her to realize that the boy band was created as a subliminal recruiting tool for the United States Navy. In the episode titled "Lisa the Vegetarian" Lisa Simpson is told by Paul McCartney that playing his 1970 song "Maybe I'm Amazed" backwards will reveal "a recipe for a really rippin' lentil soup". A modified version of the song plays in the final scene, then over the closing credits of the episode; when played backwards, McCartney can be heard reciting the recipe in the song. One of the backwards snippets says, "Oh, and by the way, I'm alive", a reference to the "Paul is dead" urban legend.

=== Music ===
During the Judas Priest subliminal message trial, lead singer Rob Halford admitted to recording the words "In the dead of the night, love bites" backwards into the track "Love Bites", from the 1984 album Defenders of the Faith. Asked why he recorded the message, Halford stated that "When you're composing songs, you're always looking for new ideas, new sounds."

Backmasking has been used by heavy metal bands to deliberately insert messages in their lyrics or imagery. Bands have utilized Satanic imagery for commercial reasons. For example, thrash metal band Slayer included at the start of the band's 1985 album Hell Awaits a deep backmasked voice repeatedly chanting "join us". Cradle of Filth, another band that has employed Satanic imagery, released a song entitled "Dinner at Deviant's Palace", consisting almost entirely of unusual sounds and a reversed reading of the Lord's Prayer.

Artists often use backmasking of sounds or instrumental audio to produce interesting sound effects. One such sound effect is the reverse echo. When done on tape, such use of backmasking is known as reverse tape effects. Backmasking has been used for artistic effect by Missy Elliott ("Work It",), Jay Chou ("You Can Hear") At the Drive-In ("300 MHz"), Klaatu ("Anus of Uranus"/"Silly Boys",) and Lacuna Coil ("Self Deception")

A related technique is to reverse an entire instrumental track. John Lennon originally wanted to do so with "Rain", but objections by producer George Martin and bandmate Paul McCartney cut the backward section to 30 seconds. Danish band Mew's 2009 album No More Stories... contains a track, "New Terrain", which, when listened to in reverse, reveals a new song, entitled "Nervous". Soul duo Gnarls Barkley released a companion version of their album The Odd Couple, an instrumental album called elpuoc ddo eht, consisting of the original album, fused into a single 38:44-long track, and reversed. This album can be legally obtained by owners of the original, as it is meant to complement it, and be a resource to samplers.

The B-side of the 1966 Napoleon XIV single "They're Coming to Take Me Away, Ha-Haaa!" is a reversed version of the entire forwards record, titled "!aaaH-aH ,yawA eM ekaT oT gnimoC er'yehT". The forward version reached #3 in the US charts and #4 in the UK.

In "Weird Al" Yankovic's "Nature Trail to Hell", from 1984's "Weird Al" Yankovic in 3-D, Yankovic's backmasked voice declares that "Satan eats Cheez Whiz". Another early example can be found on the J. Geils Band track "No Anchovies, Please", from 1980s album Love Stinks. The message, disguised as a foreign-sounding language spoken under the narration, is, "It doesn't take a genius to tell the difference between chicken shit and chicken salad."

After being accused of Satanic backmasking, Styx included an actual backmasked message in Kilroy Was Here: "Annuit cœptis, Novus ordo seclorum".

Electric Light Orchestra and Styx, following their involvement in the 1980s backmasking controversy, released songs that parody the allegations made against them. ELO, after being accused of Satanic backmasking on their 1974 album Eldorado, included backmasked messages in two songs on their next album, 1975's Face the Music. "Down Home Town" begins with a voice twice repeating (in reverse) "Face the mighty waterfall". And the opening instrumental "Fire On High" contains the backmasked message "The music is reversible, but time is not. Turn back! Turn back! Turn back! Turn back!". In 1983, ELO released an entire album, Secret Messages, in response to the controversy. Among the many backmasked messages on the album are: "Welcome to the big show" (2x); "Thank you for listening"; "Look out there's danger ahead"; "Hup two three four"; "Time After Time"; and "You're playing me backwards". Styx also released an album in response to allegations of Satanic backmasking: 1983's Kilroy Was Here, which deals with an allegorical group called the "Majority for Musical Morality" that outlaws rock music. A sticker on the album cover contains the message, "By order of the Majority for Musical Morality, this album contains secret backward messages", and the song "Heavy Metal Poisoning" does in fact contain the backmasked Latin words "Annuit cœptis, Novus ordo seclorum" ("[God] has favored our undertakings; a new order for the ages")—part of the Great Seal which encircles the pyramid on the back of the American dollar bill.

Iron Maiden's 1983 album Piece of Mind features a short backwards message, included by the band in response to allegations of Satanism that were surrounding them at the time. Between the songs "The Trooper" and "Still Life" is inebriated drummer Nicko McBrain doing an impression of Idi Amin Dada: "'What ho', sed de t'ing wid de t'ree bonce [said the thing with the three heads]. Don't meddle wid t'ings you don't understand," followed by a belch. Prince's controversial song "Darling Nikki" includes the backmasked message, "Hello, how are you? I am fine, because I know that the Lord is coming soon." The Waitresses' 1982 EP I Could Rule the World if I Could Only Get the Parts included a backwards masking warning on the cover and a message masked within the song "The Smartest Person I Know": "Anyone who believes in backwards masking is a fool."

Some messages chastise or poke fun at the listener who is playing the song backwards. One such message was included by "Weird Al" Yankovic in "I Remember Larry", from the 1996 album Bad Hair Day, on which Yankovic lightly chastises the listener with the backmasked remark, "Wow, [you] must have an awful lot of free time on your hands". Similarly, the B-52's song "Detour Through Your Mind", from the 1986 LP Bouncing off the Satellites, contains the message, "I buried my parakeet in the backyard. Oh no, you're playing the record backwards. Watch out, you might ruin your needle." A similar message comes from the Canadian band Frozen Ghost from their 1987 self-titled debut album: "You are ruining your needle!"

Meanwhile, Christian rock group Petra included in their song "Judas' Kiss", from the 1982 album More Power to Ya, the message, "What are you looking for the devil for, when you ought to be looking for the Lord?" Bloodhound Gang's 1996 controversy-begging track "Lift Your Head Up High (And Blow Your Brains Out)" mocked the Judas Priest controversy directly, and included the backmasked phrase "Devil child, wake up and eat Chef Boyardee Beefaroni". The band Mindless Self Indulgence released a song titled "Backmaskwarning!", which contains the forward lyrics "Play that record backwards / Here's a message yo for the suckas / Play that record backwards / And go fuck yourself". The backwards messages in the song include, "clean your room", "do your homework", "don't stay out too late", and "eat your vegetables".

=== Censorship ===
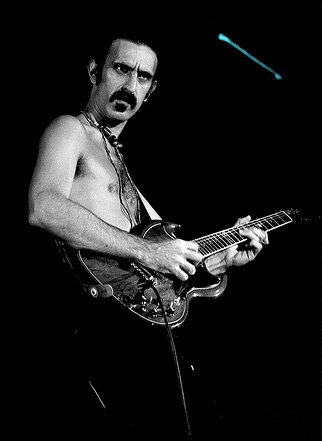
Frank Zappa used backmasking to avoid censorship.

Backmasking has been used to avoid censorship. On Frank Zappa's track "Hot Poop", from We're Only in It for the Money (1968), the released version contains at the end of its side "A" the backmasked message "Better look around before you say you don't care. / Shut your fucking mouth 'bout the length of my hair. / How would you survive / If you were alive / shitty little person?" This profanity-laced verse, originally from the song "Mother People", was censored by Verve Records, so Zappa edited the verse out, reversed it, and inserted it elsewhere in the album as "Hot Poop" (though even in the backward message the word "fucking" is censored). On the same album, a backwards message can also be heard in "Harry, You're a Beast" with Madge saying, "Don't come in me, in me" repeatedly before she starts crying. In at least one bootleg version of the album, these words are very clear.

Another example is found in Roger Waters' 1992 album Amused to Death, on which Waters recorded a backward message, possibly critical of film director Stanley Kubrick, who had refused to let Waters sample a breathing sound from 2001: A Space Odyssey. The message appears in the song "Perfect Sense Part 1", in which Waters' backmasked voice says, "Julia, however, in light and visions of the issues of Stanley, we have changed our minds. We have decided to include a backward message, Stanley, for you and all the other book burners."

On the other hand, backmasking can be used to censor words and phrases deemed inappropriate on radio edits and "clean" album releases. For example, the Fugees' clean version of the album The Score contains various backmasked profanities; thus, when playing the album backwards, the censored words are clearly audible among the backward gibberish. When used with the word "shit", this type of backmasking results in a sound similar to "ish". As a result, "ish" became a euphemism for "shit".

In Britney Spears' 2011 song "Till the World Ends", Spears says "if you want this good shit". However, on the official version, "shit" is reversed, creating the "ish" sound; therefore, the official version says "if you want this good ish". Backmasking is also used to censor the word "joint" in the video for "You Don't Know How It Feels" by Tom Petty, resulting in the line "Let's roll another tnioj".

== Accusations ==
Artists who have been accused of backmasking include Led Zeppelin, the Beatles, Pink Floyd, Electric Light Orchestra, Queen, Styx, Judas Priest, the Eagles, The Rolling Stones, Jefferson Starship, AC/DC, Black Oak Arkansas, Rush, Britney Spears, and Eminem.

Electric Light Orchestra was accused of hiding a backward Satanic message in their 1974 album Eldorado. The title track, "Eldorado", was said to contain the message "He is the nasty one / Christ, you're infernal / It is said we're dead men / Everyone who has the mark will live." ELO singer and songwriter Jeff Lynne responded by calling this accusation (and the related charge of being "devil-worshippers") "skcollob", and stating that the message "is absolutely manufactured by whoever said, 'That's what it said.' It doesn't say anything of the sort." The group included several backward messages in later albums in response to the accusations.

In 1981, Styx was accused of putting the backward message "Satan move through our voices" on the song "Snowblind", from Paradise Theatre. Guitarist James Young called these charges "rubbish," and responded, "If we want to make a statement, we'll do it in a way that people can understand us and not in a way where you have to go out and buy a $400 tape player to understand us." The vinyl reproduction of Paradise Theatre had laser etching on side one, spelling out Styx at the top, and two ladies facing each other on the sides. But on side two, the side with the song (Snow Blind) it had a black label with a small hole cut out where you could place the eraser side of a pencil, and play the album backwards to hear the backward message. In 1983, the band released a concept album, Kilroy Was Here, satirizing the Moral Majority.

A well-known alleged message is found in Led Zeppelin's 1971 song "Stairway to Heaven". The backwards playing of portions of the song purportedly results in words beginning with "Here's to my sweet Satan" and "Because I live with satan". Swan Song Records issued a statement to the contrary: "Our turntables only play in one direction—forwards." Led Zeppelin vocalist Robert Plant denied the accusations in an interview: "To me it's very sad, because 'Stairway to Heaven' was written with every best intention, and as far as reversing tapes and putting messages on the end, that's not my idea of making music." Another widely known alleged message, "It's fun to smoke marijuana", in Queen's song "Another One Bites the Dust", is similarly disclaimed by the group's spokesperson.

=== Subliminal persuasion ===
==== Fundamentalist Christian groups ====
Various fundamentalist Christian groups have declared that Satan uses—or Satan-influenced musicians use—backmasked messages to subliminally alter behavior. Pastor Gary Greenwald claimed that subliminal messages backmasked into rock music induce listeners towards sex and drug use. Minister Jacob Aranza wrote in his 1982 book Backward Masking Unmasked that rock groups "are using backmasking to convey Satanic and drug related messages to the subconscious." Christian DJ Michael Mills argued in 1981 that "the subconscious mind is being successfully affected by the repetition of beat and lyrics—being affected through a subliminal message." Mills has toured America warning Christian parents about subliminal messages in rock music.

Some Christian websites have claimed that backmasking is widely used for Satanic purposes. The web page for Alabama group Dial-the-Truth Ministries argues for the existence of Satanic backmasking in "Stairway to Heaven", saying that the song contains the backward message, "It's my sweet Satan ... Oh I will sing because I live with Satan."

==== PMRC ====
In 1985, Joe Stuessy testified to the United States Congress at the Parents Music Resource Center hearings that:

The message [of a piece of heavy metal music] may also be covert or subliminal. Sometimes subaudible tracks are mixed in underneath other, louder tracks. These are heard by the subconscious but not the conscious mind. Sometimes the messages are audible but are backward, called backmasking. There is disagreement among experts regarding the effectiveness of subliminals. We need more research on that.

Stuessy's written testimony stated that:

Some messages are presented to the listener backwards. While listening to a normal forward message (often somewhat nonsensical), one is simultaneously being treated to a backwards message (in other words, the lyric sounds like one set of words going forward, and a different set of words going backwards). Some experts believe that while the conscious mind is absorbing the forward lyric, the subconscious is working overtime to decipher the backwards message.

==== Court cases ====
Serial killer Richard Ramirez, on trial in 1988, stated that AC/DC's music, and specifically the song "Night Prowler" on Highway to Hell, inspired him to commit murder. Reverse speech advocate David John Oates claimed that "Highway to Hell", on the same album, contains backmasked messages including "I'm the law", "my name is Lucifer", and "she belongs in hell". AC/DC's Angus Young responded that "you didn't need to play [the album] backwards, because we never hid [the messages]. We'd call an album Highway to Hell, there it was right in front of them."

In 1990, British heavy metal band Judas Priest was sued over a suicide pact made by two young men in Nevada. The lawsuit by their families claimed that the 1978 Judas Priest album Stained Class contained hidden messages, including the forward subliminal words "Do it" in the song "Better by You, Better than Me" (a cover version of a Spooky Tooth song), and various backward subliminal messages. The case was dismissed by the judge for insufficient evidence of Judas Priest's placement of subliminal messages on the record, and the judge's ruling stated that "The scientific research presented does not establish that subliminal stimuli, even if perceived, may precipitate conduct of this magnitude. There exist other factors which explain the conduct of the deceased independent of the subliminal stimuli." Judas Priest members commented that if they wanted to insert subliminal commands in their music, messages leading to the deaths of their fans would be counterproductive, and they would prefer to insert the command "Buy more of our records."

=== Skepticism ===
Skeptic Michael Shermer says that the emergence of the "Paul is dead" phenomenon was caused by pareidolia. Shermer argues that the human brain evolved with a strong pattern recognition ability that was necessary to process the large amount of noise in man's environment, but that today this ability leads to false positives. Stanford University psychology professor Brian Wandell postulates that the observance of backward messages is a mistake arising from this pattern recognition facility, and argues that subliminal persuasion theories are "bizarre" and "implausible." Rumors of backmasking in popular music have been described as auditory pareidolia. James Walker, president of Christian research group Watchman Fellowship, states that "You could take a Christian hymn, and if you played it backwards long enough at different speeds, you could make that hymn say anything you want to"; Led Zeppelin publicist BP Fallon concurs, saying "Play anything backwards, and you'll find something." Eric Borgos of audio reversal website talkbackwards.com states that "Mathematically, if you listen long enough, eventually you'll find a pattern", while Jeff Milner recounts, "Most people, when I show them the site, say that they're not able to hear anything, until, of course, I show them the reverse lyrics."

Audio engineer Evan Olcott says that messages by artists including Queen and Led Zeppelin are coincidental phonetic reversals, in which the spoken or sung phonemes form new combinations of words when listened to backwards. Olcott states that "Actually engineering or planning a phonetic reversal is next to impossible, and even more difficult when trying to design it with words that fit into a song."

In 1985, University of Lethbridge psychologists John Vokey and J. Don Read conducted a study using Psalm 23 from the Bible, Queen's "Another One Bites the Dust", and other sound passages made up for the experiment. Vokey and Read concluded that if backmasking does exist, it is ineffective. Participants had trouble noticing backmasked phrases when the samples were played forwards, were unable to judge the types of messages (Christian, Satanic, or commercial), and were not led to behave in a certain way as a result of being exposed to the backmasked phrases. Vokey concluded that "we could find no effect of the meaning of engineered, backward messages on listeners' behaviour, either consciously or unconsciously." Similar results to Vokey and Read's were obtained by D. Averill in 1982. A 1988 experiment by T.E. Moore found "no evidence that listeners were influenced, consciously or unconsciously, by the content of the backward messages." In 1992, an experiment found that exposure to backward messages did not lead to significant changes in attitude. Psychology professor Mark D. Allen says that "delivering subliminal messages via backward masking is totally and ridiculously impossible".

The finding of backward Satanic messages has been explained as caused by the observer-expectancy effect. The Skeptic's Dictionary states that "you probably won't hear [backmasked] messages until somebody first points them out to you. Perception is influenced by expectation and expectation is affected by what others prime you for." In 1984, S. B. Thorne and P. Himelstein found that "when vague and unfamiliar stimuli are presented, [test subjects] are highly likely to accept suggestions, particularly when the suggestions are presented by someone with prestige and authority." Vokey and Read concluded from their 1985 experiment that "the apparent presence of backward messages in popular music is a function more of active construction on the part of the perceiver than of the existence of the messages themselves."

== See also ==
- List of backmasked messages
- Programming the Nation?
- Reverse speech
- Subliminal stimuli
