= Twilight (Electric Light Orchestra song) =

1981 song by Electric Light Orchestra

Single by Electric Light Orchestra

from the album Time
- B-side: "Julie Don't Live Here"
- Released: 16 October 1981 (UK); November 1981 (US)
- Recorded: 1981
- Studio: Musicland Studios, Munich
- Genre: Electronic rock; space rock
- Length: 3:37
- Label: Jet
- Songwriter: Jeff Lynne
- Producer: Jeff Lynne

Electric Light Orchestra singles chronology
"Hold On Tight" (1981)	"Twilight" (1981)	"Ticket to the Moon/Here Is the News" (1982)

Time track listing
- 13 tracks Side one: 1. "Prologue"; 2. "Twilight"; 3. "Yours Truly, 2095"; 4. "Ticket to the Moon"; 5. "The Way Life's Meant to Be"; 6. "Another Heart Breaks"; Side two: 7. "Rain Is Falling"; 8. "From the End of the World"; 9. "The Lights Go Down"; 10. "Here Is the News"; 11. "21st Century Man"; 12. "Hold on Tight"; 13. "Epilogue"

Music video
- "Twilight" on YouTube

"Twilight" is a song written by Jeff Lynne for English rock band Electric Light Orchestra (ELO), originally released on their 1981 album Time.

== Background ==
The lyrics tell of a man who falls asleep while in a twilight state, where he imagines everything in his life that is going to happen to him. They contribute to the album's overarching theme of time travel. ELO writer Barry Delve says that "a cacophony of sound effects...transport us chaotically to the year 2095" to start the album and that the song "doesn't stop or pause for at least 2 minutes," making the song "one of the most exciting experiences ELO ever gave you." Delve suggests that the piano break is influenced by Sergei Rachmaninoff. Billboard said that it was "more intricate" than most ELO songs and that "a grand orchestral build coincides with swirling vocal harmonies for great effect." Record World said that it has "roller-coaster surges of angelic voices and awesome strings." Messenger-Press critic Steve Wosahla said that "Twilight" "indicates that ELO may never get away from Jeff Lynne's accessibly spacey pop pizzaz." Cincinnati Post critic Jerry Stein said that it "is a pounding tune but still has that soaring arrangement favored by the Beatles in so many of their uptempo songs.

== Release and reception ==
"Twilight" was the second single released from Time, peaking at number 30 on the UK Singles Chart and number 38 on the US Billboard Hot 100.

Delve explains the single's relatively poor performance despite his thinking that it is "A-grade ELO" saying that "with Time conceived and realized as a running narrative rather than a series of unconnected songs heard in isolation, many of the lyrics are quite esoteric with their talk of such things as time transporters and baffling references to the 1980s as if they were in the distant past which would have made less sense when heard out of context on top-40 radio stations."

== Charts ==
Chart (1981)	Peak position
Australia Kent Music Report	93
Austrian Ö3 Austria Top 40	15
Dutch GfK chart	18
French SNEP Singles Chart	10
German Media Control Singles Chart	17
Irish Singles Chart	18
UK Singles Chart	30
US Billboard Hot 100	38
US Cash Box Top 100 Singles	38
US Record World Singles	39
US Radio & Records (R&R)	25

== In popular culture ==
It appeared, with authorisation and credit, in a 1982 Japanese advertisement for the Toyota Celica XX. It was also used as the finale song in the 2009–2010 Burton Snowboards film The B Movie, featuring most of the Burton team snowboarding on a "B" built out of snow.

=== Daicon IV ===
The song was used (without authorisation) as the theme music for the opening animation to the 1983 Daicon IV science fiction convention in Osaka. In 2005, as an homage to the Daicon IV animation, the song was used as the opening theme of the television series Train Man, which features an otaku as the main character. As a similar homage, from 2008 to 2025 it served as the opening song for the anime convention Otakon's AMV contest, with the exception of 2017.

It was used, without authorization, and with different lyrics, in the 1989 Luigi Cozzi film Paganini Horror.
