= Eldorado (song) =

Single by Electric Light Orchestra

from the album Eldorado
- A-side: "Boy Blue" (US); "Wild West Hero" (UK)
- Released: April 1975 (US) B-side; May 1978 (UK) B-side
- Recorded: February–August 1974
- Genre: Progressive rock, symphonic rock
- Length: 5:17 (album); 4:50 (single)
- Label: Jet, United Artists
- Songwriter: Jeff Lynne
- Producer: Jeff Lynne

Electric Light Orchestra singles chronology
"Can't Get It Out of My Head" (1974)	"Eldorado" (1975)	"Evil Woman" (1975)

Eldorado track listing
- 10 tracks Side one: 1. "Eldorado Overture"; 2. "Can't Get It Out of My Head"; 3. "Boy Blue"; 4. "Laredo Tornado"; 5. "Poor Boy (The Greenwood)"; Side two: 6. "Mister Kingdom"; 7. "Nobody's Child"; 8. "Illusions in G Major"; 9. "Eldorado"; 10. "Eldorado Finale"

"Eldorado" is the title track from the 1974 album of the same name by the Electric Light Orchestra (ELO).

The song was used as the B-side of the United States single "Boy Blue" in 1975 and later as the flip side to the UK hit single "Wild West Hero" in 1978.

== Content ==
In the 2001 remastered album's liner notes, composer Jeff Lynne said, "This song is where the dreamer wakes up to reality, then decides he likes his dream world better and tries to get back to Eldorado."

== Reception ==
Rolling Stone critic Ken Barnes remarked that although it is "embarrassingly rotund in spots" it "is a tuneful Bee Gees-like ballad." Phonograph Record critic Michael Davis similarly noted that it "displays a feel for melody...that would make a Bee Gee blush in envy."

== Controversy ==
The song gained notoriety when it was claimed by some Christian fundamentalists that "Eldorado" contained some "satanic messages" when the record was played in reverse. Lyrics were claimed to sound like "He is the nasty one - Christ you're infernal" when played backwards. Lynne denied these allegations, and inserted an obviously and deliberately backmasked segment into ELO's next album (Face the Music), within the opening portions of the famous "Fire On High" track. He later recorded Secret Messages, an entire album strewn with backmasking.

== Fleming & John version ==
The song was covered by Fleming & John on the tribute album Lynne Me Your Ears.
