= Hold On Tight (Electric Light Orchestra song) =

1981 single by Electric Light Orchestra

Single by Electric Light Orchestra

from the album Time
- B-side: "When Time Stood Still"
- Released: 17 July 1981
- Studio: Musicland (Munich, Germany)
- Genre: Rock and roll; roots rock
- Length: 3:06
- Label: Jet
- Songwriter: Jeff Lynne
- Producer: Jeff Lynne

Electric Light Orchestra singles chronology
"Don't Walk Away" (1980)	"Hold On Tight" (1981)	"Twilight" (1981)

Time track listing
- 13 tracks Side one: 1. "Prologue"; 2. "Twilight"; 3. "Yours Truly, 2095"; 4. "Ticket to the Moon"; 5. "The Way Life's Meant to Be"; 6. "Another Heart Breaks"; Side two: 7. "Rain Is Falling"; 8. "From the End of the World"; 9. "The Lights Go Down"; 10. "Here Is the News"; 11. "21st Century Man"; 12. "Hold on Tight"; 13. "Epilogue"

Music video
- "Hold On Tight" on YouTube

"Hold On Tight" is a song written and performed by English rock band Electric Light Orchestra (ELO). The song is track 12 on the band's 1981 album Time and was released as its lead single. The song entered the top 10 in several countries, topping the charts of Spain and Switzerland, peaking at number four in the United Kingdom, and reaching number 10 on the US Billboard Hot 100. A verse sung in French, which is a reprise of the first verse, translates as "Hold on to your dream, Hold on to your dream, When you see your ship leaving, When you feel your heart breaking, Hold on to your dream".

== Critical reaction ==
Billboard called it an "affectionate tip-of-the-hat to '50s rock 'n' roll" that was inspired by "Jerry Lee Lewis' pumping piano style." Record World said it has "rockabilly lead vocals, soaring Beach Boys harmonies, patented ELO keyboard waves, and a good time for all." In its review of the album, Rolling Stone said that with its "synthesized rock & roll cellos" the song is an "all-weather [single] for the here and now."

== Music video ==
At the time of its release, the song's music video had a budget of approximately £40,000. The mostly black and white video features footage of ELO playing the song in a lounge, intercut with scenes in the style of 1940s serial films featuring the band members, including violinist Mik Kaminski, who was no longer a band member nor had actually played on this song, "playing" a guitar.

== Charts ==
=== Weekly charts ===
Chart (1981–1982)	Peak position
Australia (Kent Music Report)	5
Austria (Ö3 Austria Top 40)	2
Belgium (Ultratop 50 Flanders)	4
Canada Top Singles (RPM)	6
France (IFOP)	24
Ireland (IRMA)	3
Netherlands (Dutch Top 40)	5
Netherlands (Single Top 100)	10
New Zealand (Recorded Music NZ)	7
Norway (VG-lista)	7
South Africa (Springbok Radio)	4
Spain (AFE)	1
Sweden (Sverigetopplistan)	10
Switzerland (Schweizer Hitparade)	1
UK Singles (Official Charts)	4
US Billboard Hot 100	10
US Rock Top Tracks (Billboard)	2
US Cash Box Top 100	8
US Record World	10
West Germany (GfK)	2
Zimbabwe (ZIMA)	1

=== Year-end charts ===
Chart (1981)	Rank
Australia (Kent Music Report)	32
Austria (Ö3 Austria Top 40)	6
Belgium (Ultratop 50 Flanders)	39
Canada Top Singles (RPM)	38
Netherlands (Dutch Top 40)	42
New Zealand (RIANZ)	49
Switzerland (Schweizer Hitparade)	3
US Billboard Hot 100	81
US Cash Box Top 100	55
West Germany (Media Control)	37

== Uses in other media ==
The song was the theme song for the National Coffee Association's "Join the Coffee Achievers" television commercials which ran in 1983 and 1984.

== See also ==
- List of number-one singles of 1982 (Spain)
- List of number-one singles of the 1980s (Switzerland)
