= Rain Is Falling =

Single by Electric Light Orchestra

from the album Time
- B-side: "Another Heart Breaks"
- Released: January 1982 (US)
- Recorded: 1981 at Musicland Studios, Munich
- Genre: Art rock
- Length: 3:55
- Label: Jet
- Songwriter: Jeff Lynne
- Producer: Jeff Lynne

Electric Light Orchestra singles chronology
"Ticket to the Moon" / "Here Is the News" (1981)	"Rain Is Falling" (1982)	"The Way Life's Meant to Be" (1982)

Time track listing
- 13 tracks Side one: 1. "Prologue"; 2. "Twilight"; 3. "Yours Truly, 2095"; 4. "Ticket to the Moon"; 5. "The Way Life's Meant to Be"; 6. "Another Heart Breaks"; Side two: 7. "Rain Is Falling"; 8. "From the End of the World"; 9. "The Lights Go Down"; 10. "Here Is the News"; 11. "21st Century Man"; 12. "Hold on Tight"; 13. "Epilogue"

"Rain Is Falling" is a song written and performed by Electric Light Orchestra (ELO). It was track seven on the album Time (1981) and was released as the third single from the album in the US in 1982.

As with many ELO songs written by Jeff Lynne, "Rain is Falling" uses rain as a metaphor for loss and sadness. ELO writer Barry Delve calls it "classic ELO – a beautifully sung evocative ballad with a gorgeous melody, and sound effects that perfectly conjure up the emptiness of a rainy day." Delve remarks that the third verse, starting with the lines "With their brand new time transporter/They'll think maybe I fought to get away", follows the album's time travel concept and may seem to have little to do with the rest of the song.

The song contains references to two Nursery Rhymes. At the beginning and at the end of the song can be heard "Rain Rain Go Away, come again another day" and several times throughout the song can be heard "It's Raining, It's Pouring, the old man is snoring".

Billboard called it a "grand orchestral showcase in which Jeff Lynne showcases his vocal diversity." Record World said that "celestial falsetto choruses introduce Jeff Lynne's childlike vocal lead" and that "swirling playful keyboards create a magical backdrop." It was the band's first single in the United States that failed to chart in the Billboard Hot 100 since "Boy Blue" (1975). It came incredibly close, peaking at 101 in the Bubbling Under Hot 100 Singles chart. Delve attributed the commercial failure of the single to the fact that the third verse makes little sense outside the context of the album.

== B-side ==
=== Another Heart Breaks ===
"Another Heart Breaks" is a song written and performed by the Electric Light Orchestra.

It was track six from their 1981 album Time. The track is mostly instrumental with the verse "Another Heart Breaks" repeated over and over.

== Chart positions ==
Chart (1982)	Peak Position
US Billboard Bubbling Under Hot 100 Singles	101
