= Ticket to the Moon =

Single by Electric Light Orchestra

from the album Time
- A-side: "Here Is the News"
- Released: 11 December 1981 (UK)
- Recorded: 1981
- Studio: Musicland, Munich, Germany
- Genre: Art rock
- Length: 4:07
- Label: Jet
- Songwriter: Jeff Lynne
- Producer: Jeff Lynne

Electric Light Orchestra singles chronology
"Twilight" (1981)	"Ticket to the Moon" (1981)	"Rain Is Falling" (1982)

Time track listing
- 13 tracks Side one: 1. "Prologue"; 2. "Twilight"; 3. "Yours Truly, 2095"; 4. "Ticket to the Moon"; 5. "The Way Life's Meant to Be"; 6. "Another Heart Breaks"; Side two: 7. "Rain Is Falling"; 8. "From the End of the World"; 9. "The Lights Go Down"; 10. "Here Is the News"; 11. "21st Century Man"; 12. "Hold on Tight"; 13. "Epilogue"

Music video
- "Ticket to the Moon" on YouTube

"Ticket to the Moon" is a popular song written by Jeff Lynne and performed by Electric Light Orchestra (ELO).

It was track four on the album Time (1981) and was released as a double-A single along with "Here Is the News" in January 1982, reaching number 24 in the UK charts. ELO writer Barry Delve feels that it is appropriately paired with "Ticket to the Moon" on the single since both songs "share lyrical references and have a similar string arrangement". But Delve also feels that these two songs were not the most commercial songs on Time to be released as singles, especially since their lyrics can be "enigmatic" and "mystifying" outside the context of the concept album.

The song is somewhat reminiscent of their earlier output, featuring grand piano and more strings than their past few singles. Rainer Pietsch conducted the strings on the song. The promo video featured Mik Kaminski on violin. Delve calls it a "fine ELO ballad" that is introduced by a piano piece "reminiscent of Beethoven's 'Moonlight Sonata'".

The single was also released as a limited edition 12" picture disc showing the ELO spaceship. The same image was later used as the sleeve design for the UK follow up single "The Way Life's Meant to Be".

The name was used for a compilation album in 2007, Ticket to the Moon: The Very Best of Electric Light Orchestra Volume 2.

== Chart positions ==
Chart (1982)	Peak position
French SNEP Singles Chart	4
German Media Control Singles Chart	61
Irish Singles Chart	17
UK Singles Chart	24
