= Hidden message =

Information that is not noticeable

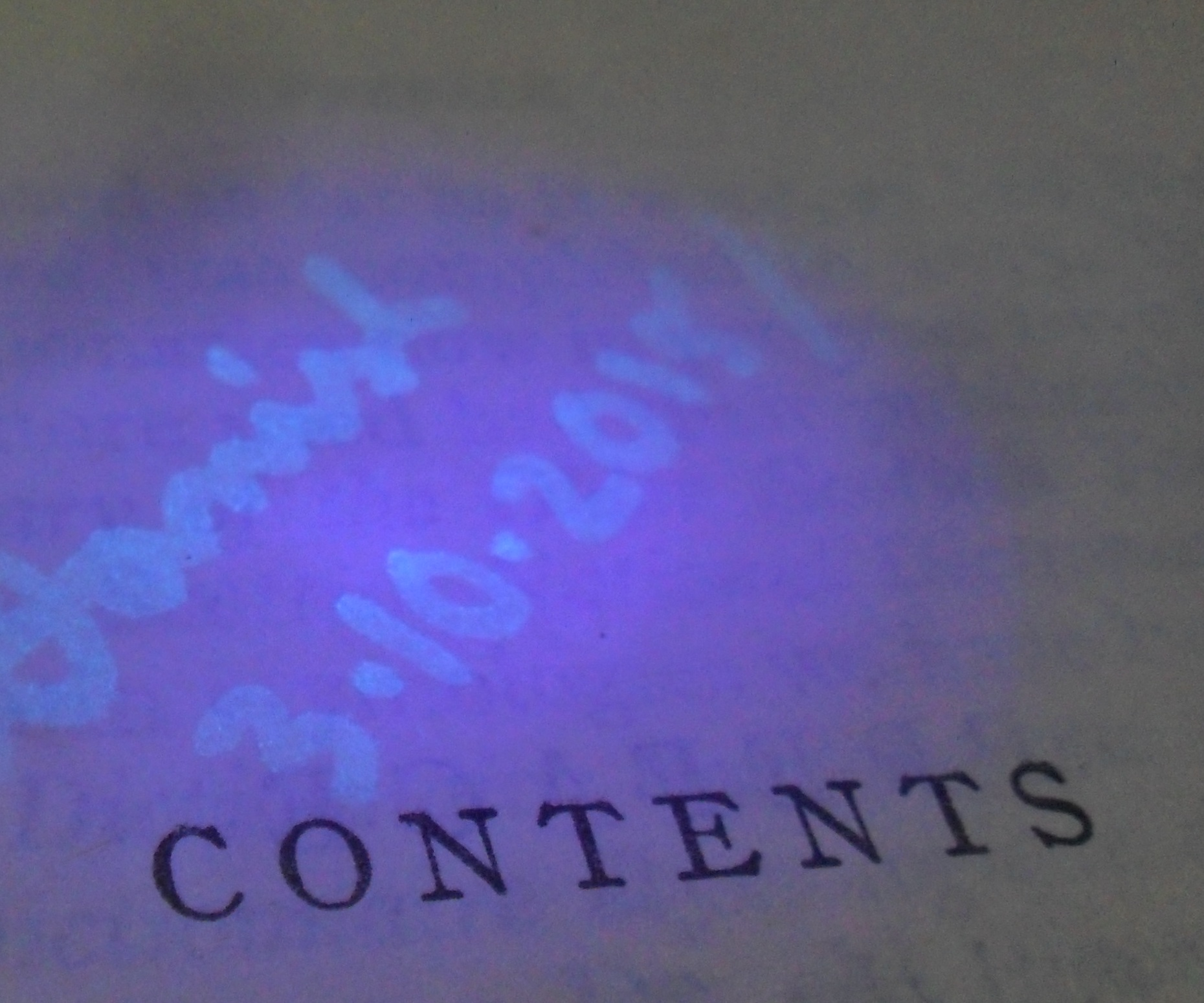
A hidden message written in UV ink

A hidden message is information that is not immediately noticeable, and that must be discovered or uncovered and interpreted before it can be known. Hidden messages include backwards audio messages, hidden visual messages and symbolic or cryptic codes such as a crossword or cipher. Although there are many legitimate examples of hidden messages created with techniques such as backmasking and steganography, many so-called hidden messages are merely fanciful imaginings or apophany.

== Description ==
The information in hidden messages is not immediately noticeable; it must be discovered or uncovered, and interpreted before it can be known. Hidden messages include backwards audio messages, hidden visual messages, and symbolic or cryptic codes such as a crossword or cipher. There are many legitimate examples of hidden messages, though many are imaginings.

== Backward audio messages ==
A backward message in an audio recording is only fully apparent when the recording is played reversed. Some backward messages are produced by deliberate backmasking, while others are simply phonetic reversals resulting from random combinations of words. Backward messages may occur in various mediums, including music, video games, music videos, movies, and television shows.

=== Backmasking ===
Backmasking is a recording technique in which a message is recorded backwards onto a track that is meant to be played forwards. It was popularized by The Beatles, who used backward vocals and instrumentation on their 1966 album Revolver. The technique has also been used to censor words or phrases for "clean" releases of songs.

Backmasking has been a controversial topic in the United States since the 1980s, when allegations of its use for Satanic purposes were made against prominent rock musicians, leading to record-burnings and proposed anti-backmasking legislation by state and federal governments. In debate are both the existence of backmasked Satanic messages and their purported ability to subliminally affect listeners. There is no scientific evidence that backmasked words can influence the listener's subconscious.

=== Phonetic reversal ===
Certain phrases produce a different phrase when their phonemes are reversed—a process known as phonetic reversal. For example, "Kiss" backwards sounds like "sick", and so the title of Yoko Ono's "Kiss Kiss Kiss" sounds like "Sick Sick Sick" or "Six Six Six" backwards. Queen's "Another One Bites the Dust" backwards was claimed that the chorus, when played in reverse, can be heard as "It's fun to smoke marijuana" or "start to smoke marijuana". The Paul is dead phenomenon was started in part because a phonetic reversal of "Number nine" (the words were constantly repeated in Revolution 9) was interpreted as "Turn me on, dead man".

According to proponents of reverse speech, phonetic reversal occurs unknowingly during normal speech.

== Visual messages ==
Hidden messages can be created in visual mediums with techniques such as hidden computer text and steganography.

In the 1980s, Coca-Cola released in South Australia an advertising poster featuring the reintroduced contour bottle, with a speech bubble, "Feel the Curves!!" An image hidden inside one of the ice cubes depicted an oral sex act. Thousands of posters were distributed to hotels and bottle shops in Australia before the mistake was discovered by Coca-Cola management. The artist of the poster was fired and all the posters were recalled. Rival PepsiCo had a similar accusation in 1990 when their promotional Pepsi Cool Cans was accused of having the word "sex" hidden in their design if two of their cans were placed atop each other.

Various other messages have been claimed to exist in Disney movies, some of them risque, such as the well-known allegation of an erection showing on a priest in The Little Mermaid. According to the Snopes website, one image "is clearly true [and] undeniably purposely inserted into the movie": a topless woman in two frames of The Rescuers.

PETA (People for the Ethical Treatment of Animals) had an antipathy towards PETCO, a pet food retailer in San Diego, regarding the purported mistreatment of live animals at their stores. When the San Diego Padres baseball team announced that the retailer had purchased naming rights to Petco Park, PETA was unable to persuade the sports team to terminate the agreement. Later, PETA successfully purchased a commemorative display brick with what appears to be a complimentary message: "Break Open Your Cold Ones! Toast The Padres! Enjoy This Championship Organization!" However, if one takes the first letters of each word, the resulting acrostic reads "BOYCOTT PETCO". Neither PETCO nor the Padres have taken any action to remove the brick, stating that if someone walked by, they would not know it had anything to do with the PETA/PETCO feud.

Secretive design language is widely used on web sites as Easter eggs or within products as hidden features, such as In-N-Out Burger's secret menu or the new Norwegian passport design for security.

== See also ==
- Apophenia
- Pareidolia
- Synchronicity
