= Here Is the News =

1981 single by Electric Light Orchestra

Single by Electric Light Orchestra

from the album Time
- A-side: "Ticket to the Moon"
- Released: 11 December 1981
- Recorded: 1981
- Studio: Musicland, Munich
- Genre: Electronic rock; new wave
- Length: 3:49
- Label: Jet
- Songwriter: Jeff Lynne
- Producer: Jeff Lynne

Electric Light Orchestra singles chronology
"Twilight" (1981)	"Here Is the News" (1981)	"Rain Is Falling" (1982)

Time track listing
- 13 tracks Side one: 1. "Prologue"; 2. "Twilight"; 3. "Yours Truly, 2095"; 4. "Ticket to the Moon"; 5. "The Way Life's Meant to Be"; 6. "Another Heart Breaks"; Side two: 7. "Rain Is Falling"; 8. "From the End of the World"; 9. "The Lights Go Down"; 10. "Here Is the News"; 11. "21st Century Man"; 12. "Hold on Tight"; 13. "Epilogue"

Music video
- "Here is the News" on YouTube

"Here Is the News" is a 1981 song written by Jeff Lynne and performed by Electric Light Orchestra (ELO).

It is track ten on the album Time (1981) and was released as a double A-side along with "Ticket to the Moon" in January 1982, reaching number 24 in the UK charts.

== Composition ==
The song makes heavy use of synthesizers but also includes guitar, bass guitar, piano, and a drum kit. The song is in Strophic form, lasts 3 minutes 43 seconds and ends with a fade out. The song is about the news programmes of 2095 and voices from news reports can be heard in the background during the song. Although some of these sound like genuine news report clips, they were voiced by Lynne and other band members as part of the recording process.

The song acts as a "doom-laden news bulletin full of chattering voices and space-age electronic effects." ELO writer Barry Delve feels that it is appropriately paired with "Ticket to the Moon" on the single since both songs "share lyrical references and have a similar string arrangement." But Delve also feels that these two songs were not the most commercial songs on Time to be released as singles, especially since their lyrics can be "enigmatic" and mystifying" outside the context of the concept album.

== Music video ==
The official music video for the song features the four official ELO members at the time, Jeff Lynne, Bev Bevan, Kelly Groucutt and Richard Tandy, as well as touring musician Mik Kaminski, acting as journalists in a parody newsroom scene. This is interspersed with footage of Lynne dressed as a TV newsreader, singing the lyrics to the song as if performing a TV news broadcast.

== Legacy ==
The intro of 'Here is the News' is also used in the idents and channel branding of the VPRO, a Dutch broadcasting channel. The idents of the VPRO with 'Here is the News' have been used as leaders on television since 1981, and are used since 2003 at the end of a program. The VPRO used to use the intro on the radio to inform listeners of Radio 3 (later NPO 3FM) that a program of the VPRO was about to start. The intro of the song was also used by TVM in Malta in the intro to their news program L-aħbarijiet between 1987 and 1992, as well as in the regional news programme Vmeste ("Together") in the Russian region of Novosibirsk on the local branch of TV station Mir from 1994 to 1995; now it is used by Polish radio station Radio Aniol Beskidow as a news jingle.

== Chart positions ==
Chart (1982)	Peak Position
French SNEP Singles Chart	4
German Media Control Singles Chart	61
Irish Singles Chart	17
UK Singles Chart	24
