= Face the Music (Electric Light Orchestra album) =

Studio album by Electric Light Orchestra
- Released: September 1975
- Recorded: May–June 1975
- Studios: Musicland Studios, Munich, Germany; strings overdubbed at De Lane Lea Studios, London; mixed at The Record Plant, New York City
- Genres: Art rock; progressive pop
- Length: 36:22
- Labels: Jet (UK); United Artists (US)
- Producer: Jeff Lynne

Electric Light Orchestra chronology
Showdown (1974)	Face the Music (1975)	Olé ELO (1976)

Singles from Face the Music
- 1. "Evil Woman" Released: 31 October 1975; 2. "Strange Magic" Released: February 1976; 3. "Nightrider" Released: 19 March 1976

Professional ratings
Review scores
Source	Rating
AllMusic	4/5 stars
Encyclopedia of Popular Music	4/5 stars
The Music Box	3/5 stars
MusicHound	3.5/5
The Rolling Stone Album Guide	3/5 stars

Face the Music is the fifth studio album by Electric Light Orchestra (ELO). It was released in September 1975 by United Artists Records and on 14 November 1975 in the United Kingdom by Jet Records. The album moves away from the large-scale classical orchestrated sound of the previous album, Eldorado, in favour of more "radio-friendly" pop/rock songs, though the string sections are still very prominent. The new sound proved successful for the group, for Face the Music was the first ELO album to go platinum.

== Overview ==
By January 1975, bass player Mike de Albuquerque and cellist Mike Edwards had left the band during the Eldorado recording sessions and subsequent tour, respectively. Bass player Kelly Groucutt and classically trained cellist Melvyn Gale joined the band as their replacements. Following the conclusion of the European leg of the Eldorado tour, the band began recording the new album at Musicland Studios in Munich, West Germany. ELO had frequently opened for Deep Purple on the initial North American leg of the Eldorado tour, and Deep Purple had recommended Musicland to ELO. This was the first time ELO recorded at Musicland; the band later returned to record most of their future albums there, with sound engineer Mack.

Lynne, also the band's sole songwriter, wanted to move towards more tunes that would be memorable, rather than the progressive rock style of the group's first three albums and the symphonic sound of Eldorado. New elements were added to devise a satisfying but more complex sound, such as female backing vocalists (Ellie Greenwich, Susan Collins, Nancy O'Neill and Margaret Raymond), a choir, and having the band's string trio of Mik Kaminski, Hugh McDowell and Melvyn Gale mixed into the backing 30-piece string section while also allowing them to perform some of the solos on the records. Lynne was the lead vocalist for the majority of the songs, although Kelly Groucutt sang lead vocals on "Poker" and (alternating with Lynne) on "Nightrider", giving the tracks a dynamic sound. The backing orchestra was taped separately from the band's initial sessions, being recorded instead at De Lane Lea Studios in London, England.

The back cover of the record sleeve shows the members of the band with their faces pressed against a glass panel, supposedly watching the "electrocution" depicted on the front cover. Richard Tandy is looking away, because he disliked the idea and did not wish to participate.

== Songs ==
=== Side One ===
==== "Fire on High" ====
"Fire on High" is the opening track of the album.

It begins with a haunting synthesizer (provided by Richard Tandy) playing a repeating broken chord of E♭, A, C, A along with a backing choir. The backing orchestration is minimal, featuring small bits here and there during which a "knocking" sound suddenly appears and fades out before a baritone voice fades in speaking a back-masked message. Drummer, Bev Bevan provided the voice and when the record is played backwards, he exclaims "The music is reversible but time is not. Turn back, turn back, turn back, turn back". This inclusion was a joke by Jeff Lynne, who faced mild controversy from a Christian fundamentalist group, accusing him of including backwards Satanic messages on the track "Eldorado" from their previous album of the same title. The orchestration grows as a choir chants "Hallelujah" similar to the fashion of Handel's Messiah. The haunting opening concludes with the backing orchestra repeating the same broken chord as the synthesizer before transitioning into a more symphonic-rock bridge accompanied by the drums. The synthesizer plays an arpeggio during which the strings play riffs. Following this, Lynne provides a guitar-solo and the strings follow after. The song suddenly shifts to a rock sound with a prominent acoustic guitar riff where Kelly Groucutt joins on the bass guitar. Kaminski, McDowell and Gale all solo together on this rock section. The rock section is followed by another symphonic-rock bridge with another guitar solo which, again, leads into a rock section. The choir at the end of the track chants "Fire on high" several times, providing the song the only set of true lyrics.

Jeff Lynne later remarked of this track: "I tried to write, sort of, in a classical style but have rock 'n' roll instruments playing it, you know, and orchestra together."

"Fire on High" was released as the B-side of the US "Sweet Talkin' Woman" single and the UK "Livin' Thing" single.

==== "Waterfall" ====
"Waterfall" is the second track on the album and the shortest track on side one.

Opening with an orchestra intro and guitar solo, "Waterfall" is a slower and softer song in contrast to its predecessor. Lynne sings the lead vocals while Groucutt sings harmony vocals on the chorus. Kaminski, McDowell and Gale all play together mixed with the backing orchestra in the song's entirety, adding an extra layer of orchestration. The guitar and orchestral outro fade into the orchestra opening to "Evil Woman". The song is written in D major.

The song was released as a single in France and Australia, where it became a minor hit.

Jeff Lynne has said that "Waterfall" is one of his favorite songs in the ELO catalogue.

The full instrumental (save for the guitar and string fade-in) of this song was released as a bonus track on the 2006 Face the Music reissue. It includes a small section of in-studio banter and Lynne doing a count-in, and also includes a slightly extended studio ending.

==== "Evil Woman" ====
"Evil Woman" is the third track on the album.

The song was written by Lynne in a matter of just a few minutes near the end of the Face the Music studio sessions in June 1975. Originally supposed to be a filler track to give the album a longer runtime, it became a worldwide hit and was released as a single a month after the album's release. The main song features a more disco-like rhythm (aside from the short orchestral interlude on the album version) with Tandy's piano riff and Lynne's acoustic guitar playing the chords Am, Em7 and Dm7. The female backing vocalists sang on the track during the "ha ha" pieces, the "hey hey hey" in the middle section of the song and the chorus, alongside Lynne and Groucutt. The chorus featured an riff of the clavinet (played by Tandy). The second verse includes the ELO string players playing the string rhythm section behind Lynne's vocals. The lyrics "There's a hole in my head where the rain comes in" is a reference to the Beatles' song "Fixing a Hole". The final chord of the opening section (You made a fool of me) is actually mixed into "Fire on High" during the back-masked message.

The middle section features a piano solo by Tandy and a string ascending melody together before cutting a string break. This break is actually a reversed cut of a string crescendo from the next track "Nightrider" put onto the track merely because, as Lynne described it, "[the two songs] were in the same key". Lynne later remarked on how amazed he was that the transition fitted into place so well.

==== "Nightrider" ====
"Nightrider" is the fourth and final song on side one of the album. It was released as a single but, unlike the other two album singles, did not chart.

The track is unique for featuring both Lynne and Groucutt (though alternating) singing the lead vocals. It starts with a Moog chord progression and string backing. The first verse has the ELO string trio playing the solo bits. The drums, guitar and bass all join on the pre-chorus ("Hold on, nightrider") along with backing harmonies from Greenwich, Collins, O'Neill and Raymond. Just before each chorus, there is a small orchestral and choir break, the third of which is extended and includes a string crescendo which was later reversed and used on "Evil Woman". Raymond later explained that Lynne instructed the backing vocalists to emulate the sounds of the strings on the final verse for a specific sound, saying:

"On the part where he sings 'desolation degradation row, etc.' listen in the background... You hear string, but its also our voices emulating the string parts... I thought that was simply genius on Jeff Lynne's part to come up with that. Vocals that emulate string parts." — Marge Raymond

=== Side Two ===
==== "Poker" ====
"Poker" is the opening track of (and shortest track on) side two of the album and the fifth track overall.

The song is a fast-tempo guitar-rocker featuring Kelly Groucutt on both lead and harmony vocals, one of few times where Jeff Lynne does not sing the lead. Bev Bevan plays fast, bombastic drum fills in between verses and Richard Tandy provides a moog synthesizer arpeggio rhythm section. The middle section of the song slows down into a slow, bluesy bridge ("Play me another hand") with Tandy adding in some synthesizer fillers. Lynne's harmony vocals come in on the final verse of the song.

"Poker" was released as the B-side of the US "Confusion" single and the UK "Rockaria!" single.

==== "Strange Magic" ====
"Strange Magic" is the sixth track on the album and the second on side two. It was the second single lifted from Face the Music, being released in February 1976, though was not as successful as "Evil Woman".

The track opens with a 21-second orchestra intro before cutting to a guitar lick with a soft piano. The choruses feature Lynne solely singing "Strange magic" three times, before jumping an octave higher singing "Got a strange magic" along with Groucutt, Greenwich, Collins, O'Neill and Raymond on harmony vocals. Each chorus features more instrumentation than the previous one: the first being just a guitar with a phaser effect, piano and mild percussion, the second having drums and an ascending string orchestration added, and the third having more layers of strings. The bridge following the third chorus features some of the female singers singing "It's magic, it's magic, it's magic" and the final choruses include an additional different "Strange magic" melody done by the women. The album version fades into a back-masked reprise of the chorus of "Waterfall", ultimately leading into the next track "Down Home Town".

The guitar solo is played by Tandy rather than Lynne, the latter recalled:

"I just couldn't work it out. It was such a long run with two fingers." — Jeff Lynne, interview with Uncle Joe Benson

Lynne says in the Flashback liner notes that he wrote the song on various pianos in separate places while on tour in England with the band.

==== "Down Home Town" ====
"Down Home Town" is the seventh track on the album and the third on side two.

The song opens with a back-masked reprise of the chorus of the track "Waterfall", but switches into an American folk-rock-based sound. The ELO string trio has a greater influence on the sound of this track, playing independently from the backing orchestra in a more fiddle-like fashion. Lynne sings the lead vocal in a nasal, "Nashville hoedown" style. While the four female singers usually sang in unison, this track features four-part harmonies during the "Look away" section; according to Raymond, the four were also allowed to add small bits with Lynne's approval, such as Raymond's line "Ooh, I feel you comin' down now." The song quotes the minstrel show tune "Dixie".

"Down Home Town" was released as the B-side of the US "Last Train to London" single and the UK "The Diary of Horace Wimp" single.

==== "One Summer Dream" ====
"One Summer Dream" is the eighth and final track on the album.

The song features an orchestral opening with Lynne singing with a soft tenor voice; the main verses and chorus feature Lynne on acoustic guitar with a phaser effect on it. Only Marge Raymond was featured on the track and sang the female chorus parts. The song includes a long fade of the lyrics "One summer dream", concluding the album.

Lynne's father, who had been vocally critical about Lynne's early albums, admired the song, and Lynne recalled that his father would hum it.

Though a peaceful, easy-listening ballad, Lynne remarked in the Flashback notes that it was a "protest" song.

"One Summer Dream" was released as the B-side of the "Mr. Blue Sky" single.

== Release ==
The singles "Evil Woman" and "Strange Magic" were the most commercially successful songs that the group had recorded up to that point. "Evil Woman" was a hit in the UK and the US. Lynne wrote the chords and melody of this song in only six minutes, making it his fastest feat of composition.

"Nightrider" became the third single from the album; despite an appearance on the UK chart television program Top of the Pops, it failed to chart.

Notwithstanding the success of the singles, the LP failed to chart in the UK. The album was remastered and released in September 2006 with bonus tracks.

== Track listing ==
All songs written by Jeff Lynne.

Side one
No.	Title	Length
1.	"Fire On High"	5:30
2.	"Waterfall"	4:11
3.	"Evil Woman"	4:35
4.	"Nightrider"	4:26

Side two
No.	Title	Length
5.	"Poker"	3:31
6.	"Strange Magic"	4:29
7.	"Down Home Town"	3:53
8.	"One Summer Dream"	5:47
Total length:		36:22

2006 remaster bonus tracks
No.	Title	Length
9.	"Fire on High Intro" (early alternate mix)	3:23
10.	"Evil Woman" (stripped down mix)	5:00
11.	"Strange Magic" (US single edit)	3:27
12.	"Waterfall" (instrumental mix)	4:15

Cassette Track Listing
No.	Title	Length
1.	"Fire on High"	5:29
2.	"Waterfall"	4:11
3.	"Evil Woman"	4:34
4.	"Down Home Town"	3:53
5.	"Poker"	3:30
6.	"Strange Magic"	4:29
7.	"One Summer Dream"	5:45
8.	"Nightrider"	4:22
Total length:		36:22

== Personnel ==
- Jeff Lynne – lead vocals, guitars, producer
- Bev Bevan – drums, percussion, spoken intro (backwards), backing vocals
- Richard Tandy – piano, clavinet, Moog, guitar, Wurlitzer electric piano, tack piano
- Kelly Groucutt – vocals, bass, backing vocals, lead vocals on "Poker", co-lead vocals on "Nightrider"
- Mik Kaminski – violin
- Hugh McDowell – cello
- Melvyn Gale – cello

=== Additional personnel ===
- Ellie Greenwich – uncredited vocals
- Susan Collins – uncredited vocals
- Nancy O'Neill – uncredited vocals
- Margaret Raymond – uncredited vocals
- Mack – engineer
- Richard Goldblatt - Audio Engineer (Orchestral and choral, Keyboard, Guitar and Synth + @ The Music Centre Wembley)
- Jeff Lynne, Richard Tandy and Louis Clark – Orchestral and choral arrangements
- Orchestra conducted by Louis Clark
- Although Greenwich, Collins, O'Neill and Raymond are not credited as vocalists, the liner notes indicated 'special thanks' to them.

== Charts ==
=== Weekly charts ===
Chart (1975–1976)	Peak position
Australian Albums (Kent Music Report)	30
Canada Top Albums/CDs (RPM)	31
Dutch Albums (Album Top 100)	11
Swedish Albums (Sverigetopplistan)	41
US Billboard 200	8
US CashBox Top 100 Albums	13

=== Year-end charts ===
Chart (1976)	Peak position
US Billboard Year-End	11

== Certifications ==
Region	Certification	Certified units/sales
Canada (Music Canada)	Gold	50,000^{^}
United States (RIAA)	Gold	500,000^{^}
^{^} Shipments figures based on certification alone.
