= The Way Life's Meant to Be =

1982 single by Electric Light Orchestra

Single by Electric Light Orchestra

from the album Time
- B-side: "Wishing"
- Released: 12 March 1982
- Recorded: 1981
- Studio: Polar Studios, Stockholm, Sweden
- Genre: Pop rock
- Length: 4:38
- Label: Jet
- Songwriter: Jeff Lynne
- Producer: Jeff Lynne

Electric Light Orchestra singles chronology
"Rain Is Falling" (1982)	"The Way Life's Meant to Be" (1982)	"Rock 'n' Roll Is King" (1983)

"The Way Life's Meant to Be" is a song by English rock band Electric Light Orchestra (ELO). The song was initially released in the band's 1981 album Time, but was eventually released as a single in March 1982. It was the first Time song to be recorded, and was played in a studio different from the one most songs in the album were recorded. "The Way Life's Meant to Be" was the final Time single to be released.

This song is more Southern European-influenced than other ELO songs and features instruments such as castanets. "The Way Life's Meant to Be" deals with the narrator's experience in the future, feeling dismay as a street he remembers has been distorted from his memory, having grown plastic flowers and ivory towers.

The song was written and produced by Jeff Lynne, who sings and plays guitars in the song. It was engineered by Reinhold Mack and conducted by Rainer Pietsch. "The Way Life's Meant to Be" did not chart in the United Kingdom and the United States, though it peaked at number 30 in West Germany, charting from the start of February to early April. Despite its low charting, the song has generally received positive reviews from critics.

== Writing and release ==
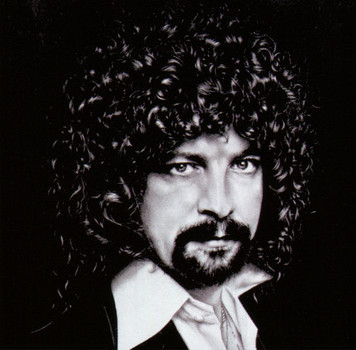
Jeff Lynne (pictured), wrote, sang and produced "The Way Life's Meant to Be"

"The Way Life's Meant to Be" was written and produced by ELO's songwriter, guitarist, and lead vocalist Jeff Lynne. Lynne describes early takes of the song as "a bit Russian", until castanets were added which made it more "Spanish". "The Way Life's Meant to Be" was recorded under the working title "Some Russian", possibly for the song's "burly vocals." According to ELO drummer Bev Bevan, the castanets and acoustic guitars in layers were intended to give the song a Phil Spector-ish wall of sound feel.

While most Time songs were recorded at Musicland Studios in Munich, "The Way Life's Meant To Be" was recorded at Polar Studios in Stockholm. It was the first song recorded for Time, having been recorded a few months before the main sessions. "The Way Life's Meant to Be" was the fifth and final single to be released from the album and was released on 12 March 1982. The single's cover art was illustrated by Japanese artist Goro Shimaoka. The B-side, "Wishing", is a track from ELO's 1979 album Discovery.

== Composition ==
The Way Life's Meant to Be
A 21-second sample of "The Way Life's Meant to Be", demonstrating the Southern European influence and dystopian lyrics

"The Way Life's Meant to Be" is four minutes and 30 seconds long. It features Southern European-influenced instrumentation such as flamenco-like guitars and castanets. Lynne sang, played guitars, and produced the song, while Reinhold Mack engineered it. The string sections were conducted by Rainer Pietsch. The song starts with a violin section which was reversed from the previous single "Rain Is Falling".

Lyrically, "The Way Life's Meant to Be" describes a man from 1981 who enters the year 2095. The man, who roams a street he recognises, is dismayed by the plastic flowers and ivory towers which have grown on top of it, and wishes to return to 1981. He wonders if this is the way life's meant to be. Jack Butler of National Review compared the guitar solo of "The Way Life's Meant to Be" to The Beach Boys' "Heroes and Villains", and ELO's 1977 song "Across the Border". Lyn Stanley of The Forest Scout believes "The Way Life's Meant to Be" gives a "Wild West vibe".

== Reception and commercial performance ==
"The Way Life's Meant to Be" was the first ELO single since 1976 (Nightrider) to not chart in the United States nor the United Kingdom. Before its single release, "The Way Life's Meant to Be" charted in West Germany, having debuted at number 31 on the week of 1 February 1982. While it declined to number 34 the following week, it reached its peak during the week of 15 February, reaching number 30. The song remained on the West German charts for about two months, until eventually reaching 71 on the week of April 5.

"The Way Life's Meant to Be" has generally received positive reviews from music critics. Steven Hyden of Uproxx included "The Way Life's Meant to Be" in his list of 10 ELO "deep cuts" to listen to before the Rock Hall Telecast. He said it is "a blissful slice of Brill Building pop that sounds like it was produced by Phil Spector on Mars", and compared the song's sound with Lynne's later works in the Traveling Wilburys and Tom Petty's Full Moon Fever. Ewan Gallow of Cult Following called "The Way Life's Meant to Be" "a rare gem worth sticking around for, another best-of-contender" in his review of Time. He considers the song his second favourite song from the original double album, behind "When Time Stood Still".

James Chrispell of AllMusic stated in his review of Time: "'The Way Life's Meant to Be' echoes very early ELO hits like 'Can't Get It Out of My Head,' [...]". David Brennun of The Quietus described "The Way Life's Meant to Be" as "an archetypal mid-tempo Lynne stormer that would have fitted in a treat alongside 'Sweet Talkin' Woman' at the recent greatest-hits shows. It has one of those memorable Lynne melodies so ostensibly simple it’s a wonder only he appears able to write them (funny that; it’s almost as if he has a preternatural gift for making something very difficult seem winningly easy.)"

== Live performances ==
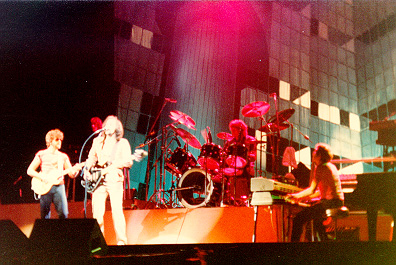
"The Way Life's Meant to Be" was performed during the Time tour

"The Way Life's Meant to Be" occurs on 22 setlists during the Time tour. The song is present in the following setlists, all of which date from February–March 1982: Drammenshallen (4 February), Johanneshovs Isstadion (6 February), Brøndbyhallen (7 February), Ahoy (10 February), Forest National (11 February), Festhalle (13 & 14 February), Hall Rhénus (15 February), Parc des Expositions de la Porte de Versailles (16 February), Palais des Sports (18 February), Hallenstadion (19 February), Westfalenhalle 1 (20 and 21 February), Scandinavium (23 February), Stadthalle (25 February), Carl-Diem-Halle (26 February), Eissporthalle (27 February), Deutschlandhalle (28 February), Sporthalle (2 & 3 March), Saarlandhalle (4 March), and Olympiahalle (5 March).

Despite it being present in the Johanneshovs Isstadion setlist, attendee Mattias Ekstam suggests "Here Is the News" was performed by ELO rather than "The Way Life's Meant to Be", the latter song having replaced the former ahead of the European segment of the tour.

== Track listing ==
7" single (1982 release)

1. "The Way Life's Meant to Be" – 4:38
2. "Wishing" – 4:14

== Personnel ==
Credits adapted the album's liner notes.

Electric Light Orchestra

- Jeff Lynne — lead and backing vocals, electric and acoustic guitars, piano, synthesizers, vocoder, production
- Bev Bevan — drums, percussion
- Richard Tandy — acoustic and electric pianos, synthesizers, vocoder, guitars
- Kelly Groucutt — bass guitar, backing vocals

Other personnel

- Mack — engineering
- Rainer Pietsch – string conductor

== Charts ==
Chart (1982)	Position
Germany (GfK)	30
