= One Summer Dream =

Single by Electric Light Orchestra

from the album Face the Music
- A-side: "Mr. Blue Sky"
- Released: 13 January 1978 (UK); June 1978 (US)
- Recorded: 1975
- Studio: Musicland, Munich, Germany
- Genre: Symphonic rock, art rock
- Length: 5:48; 5:22 (Single version)
- Label: Jet
- Songwriter(s): Jeff Lynne
- Producer(s): Jeff Lynne

Electric Light Orchestra singles chronology
"Turn to Stone" (1977)	"One Summer Dream" (1978)	"Sweet Talkin' Woman" (1978)

Face the Music track listing
- 8 tracks Side one: 1. "Fire On High"; 2. "Waterfall"; 3. "Evil Woman"; 4. "Nightrider"; Side two: 5. "Poker"; 6. "Strange Magic"; 7. "Down Home Town"; 8. "One Summer Dream"

"One Summer Dream" is a song written by Jeff Lynne and performed by the rock group Electric Light Orchestra (ELO) which made its first appearance on the band's fifth album, Face the Music, as the last track off the album. It also appeared on the box sets, Afterglow and Flashback.

Writer Barry Delve said that the song "induces a mesmeric, hypnotic effect through a combination of the return of the 'Strange Magic' phased acoustic guitar...and an arrangement that obliviously creeps up on the listener, as layers of harmony, choir and instrumentation are imperceptibly introduced and subtly removed again, until all we're left with is Lynne's yearning voice accompanied by the haunting backing vocals." Green Bay Press-Gazette critic Warren Gerds said that it "drifts along like a haunting dream." Music journalist John Van Der Kiste called it a "laid back affair with lush strings" in which "Lynne sounds relaxed as he almost croons the words."

It was released as the B-side of the hit single "Mr. Blue Sky" in 1978. The album version includes an orchestra intro but part of it was cut for the single. as was the backing vocal by Ellie Greenwich. "One Summer Dream" (on different singles with "Mr. Blue Sky") has a fading difference.

Rolling Stone critic Charley Walters wrote that "The seven ELO members outdo themselves, however, on One Summer Dream, a beautiful and evocative tune sung touchingly by Lynne. A trifle sentimental perhaps, but lyrically and musically, it displays more emotion (not to mention pure ability) than one ordinarily hears from a rock group."

Classic Rock History critic Brian Kachejian rated "One Summer Dream" as ELO's greatest song, calling it a "jaw-dropping emotionally filled piece of music" and saying that "This is as beautiful as popular music gets. The song stands as the band’s most underrated song and easily one of the most unheralded gems of the 1970s."
