= Mister Kingdom =

- French release picture sleeve

Single by Electric Light Orchestra

from the album Eldorado
- A-side: "Turn to Stone"
- Released: 1974; 1977 (single version)
- Genre: Symphonic rock
- Length: 5:29
- Label: Jet
- Songwriter(s): Jeff Lynne
- Producer(s): Jeff Lynne

Electric Light Orchestra singles chronology
"Telephone Line" (1977)	"Mister Kingdom" (1974)	"Mr. Blue Sky" (1978)

Eldorado track listing
- 10 tracks Side one: 1. "Eldorado Overture"; 2. "Can't Get It Out of My Head"; 3. "Boy Blue"; 4. "Laredo Tornado"; 5. "Poor Boy (The Greenwood)"; Side two: 6. "Mister Kingdom"; 7. "Nobody's Child"; 8. "Illusions in G Major"; 9. "Eldorado"; 10. "Eldorado Finale"

"Mister Kingdom" is a song in the symphonic rock genre written by the Electric Light Orchestra (ELO).

The song first appeared as the opening track of side 2, track number 6 from their 1974 album, Eldorado. It was the B-side to the 1977 hit "Turn to Stone", found on their album Out of the Blue.

On the single version, the solo slowly fades from 5:05 all the way to the very end at 5:29. On the Flashback boxset, the solo fades about 16 seconds earlier than the LP version, also cutting the small orchestra intro.

Rolling Stone critic Ken Barnes remarked that "Mister Kingdom" "pleasantly evokes The Beatles' 'Across the Universe'". Other critics have also commented on the song's similarity to "Across the Universe". The song features an extended orchestral playout starting from 4:16 to 5:29, transitioning into Nobody's Child.

Phonograph Record critic Michael Davis said that in "Mister Kingdom" Lynne "displays a feel for melody...that would make a Bee Gee blush in envy."

Jeff Lynne has said the following about the song and its subject:

This guy's always looking for a pot of gold.

— Eldorado remaster

God knows what this is about, but I like the sound.

— Flashback
