= Strange Magic (song) =

Single by Electric Light Orchestra

from the album Face the Music
- B-side: "Showdown (Live)" (UK); "New World Rising" (US)
- Released: February 1976 (US)
- Recorded: 1975
- Studio: Musicland Studios, Munich
- Genre: Psychedelia
- Length: 4:29 (Album version); 4:06 (UK single edit); 3:22 (US single edit)
- Label: Jet
- Songwriter: Jeff Lynne
- Producer: Jeff Lynne

Electric Light Orchestra singles chronology
"Evil Woman" (1975)	"Strange Magic" (1976)	"Nightrider" (1976)

Face the Music track listing
- 8 tracks Side one: 1. "Fire On High"; 2. "Waterfall"; 3. "Evil Woman"; 4. "Nightrider"; Side two: 5. "Poker"; 6. "Strange Magic"; 7. "Down Home Town"; 8. "One Summer Dream"

"Strange Magic" is a song written by Jeff Lynne and performed by Electric Light Orchestra (ELO). It was originally released on their 1975 Face the Music album.

The 'weeping' guitar lick was provided by keyboardist Richard Tandy while Jeff Lynne played a 12-string acoustic guitar fed through a phase shifter. The song has been described as psychedelic.

== Versions ==
The song has a complicated history with a number of different versions — most by ELO and one by Jeff Lynne alone — released both as a single and as a track on a number of different albums.

After its initial appearance on Face the Music, it was released as a single in 1976 in two versions, one for the US and one for the UK, both different from the original. The US single was more edited than the UK single which appeared as it was originally in Face the Music, but without the orchestral intro.

Also in 1976, "Strange Magic" was included as the final track in the United Artists Records promotional ELO album, Olé ELO.

In 1978, the song was included on the band's The ELO EP.

A remastered version was included on the box set Flashback in 2000.

In September 2006, a remastered Face the Music album was released; it contained the US edit version from the 1976 single releases.

Finally, Jeff Lynne re-recorded the song in his own home studio in 2012. It was released in a compilation album with other re-recorded ELO songs, under the ELO name.

== Critical reception ==
AllMusic's Donald A. Guarisco considered it one of the best tracks on their "breakthrough" album Face the Music, praising Jeff Lynne's skill at "creating ballads that are as memorably hook-laden as his uptempo pop tunes", noting the "stunning intro full of swirling strings, some George Harrison-styled slide guitar riffs". Billboard considered it to be an "easy rocker" with "smooth vocals and skillful string arrangements." Record World said that "an immaculate production by Jeff Lynne maintains the high calibre of the group's recorded work."

Stereogum contributor Ryan Reed rated it as ELO's 3rd best song, saying that it shows "Lynne's mastery of tension and release" and noting the "odd arrangement" with "ascending and descending strings, random jazz accents of the keys" and drums that enter halfway through the song but without stereotypical bluster.

== Chart performance ==
=== Weekly charts ===
Chart (1976)	Peak position
Australia (Kent Music Report)	85
Canada Adult Contemporary (RPM)	41
Canada Top Singles (RPM)	42
UK Singles (Official Charts)	38
US Billboard Hot 100	14
US Billboard Top 50 Easy Listening	24
US Cash Box	14
US Record World	20

=== Year-end charts ===
Chart (1976)	Rank
US Cash Box	77

== Certifications ==
Region	Certification	Certified units/sales
United States (RIAA)	Gold	500,000^{‡}
^{‡} Sales+streaming figures based on certification alone.
