= Poor Boy (The Greenwood) =

Single by Electric Light Orchestra

from the album Eldorado
- A-side: "Telephone Line"
- Released: 21 May 1977
- Genre: Symphonic rock, rock
- Length: 2:57; 2:34 (King of the Universe)
- Label: Jet (UK); United Artists (US)
- Songwriter: Jeff Lynne
- Producer: Jeff Lynne

Eldorado track listing
- 10 tracks Side one: 1. "Eldorado Overture"; 2. "Can't Get It Out of My Head"; 3. "Boy Blue"; 4. "Laredo Tornado"; 5. "Poor Boy (The Greenwood)"; Side two: 6. "Mister Kingdom"; 7. "Nobody's Child"; 8. "Illusions in G Major"; 9. "Eldorado"; 10. "Eldorado Finale"

"Poor Boy (The Greenwood)" is a song written by Jeff Lynne and the Electric Light Orchestra (ELO).

The song is track number 5 from their 1974 album Eldorado and tells the story of the Dreamer on the hill fantasising he is one of Robin Hood's merry men, forming the fourth dream.

"A Robin Hood type character who actually maid Marion." Jeff Lynne (2001 - Eldorado Remaster)

It was released as the second single A-side from Eldorado in The Netherlands, but failed to chart.

Rolling Stone critic Ken Barnes called it "a robber ballad cleverly employing an uncanny John Wesley Harding soundalike vocal." Phonograph Record critic Michael Davis called it a "catchy, upbeat pop number" that "ain't rock'n'roll."

The song was used as the B-side for "Telephone Line" in the US, and in the UK the song was joined with "King of the Universe" on the flip side.

The version performed on their concert film, "Fusion – Live in London" uses the last couple of seconds, 2:27 - 2:57, reprise of "Eldorado Overture", as used for the ending of side 1 of the album.
