= Fire On High =

Single by Electric Light Orchestra

from the album Face the Music
- A-side: "Livin' Thing" (UK); "Sweet Talkin' Woman" (US)
- Released: 29 October 1976 (UK); February 1978 (US)
- Recorded: 1975
- Genre: Art rock, progressive rock
- Length: 5:31 (Album version); 4:01 (US single version)
- Label: Jet/United Artists (UK); United Artists (US)
- Songwriter: Jeff Lynne
- Producer: Jeff Lynne

Face the Music track listing
- 8 tracks Side one: 1. "Fire On High"; 2. "Waterfall"; 3. "Evil Woman"; 4. "Nightrider"; Side two: 5. "Poker"; 6. "Strange Magic"; 7. "Down Home Town"; 8. "One Summer Dream"

"Fire on High" is the opening instrumental track from the 1975 Electric Light Orchestra (ELO) album Face the Music.

The song was the UK B-side to the band's worldwide hit single "Livin' Thing", issued in blue vinyl. It was also later included — in an edited form minus the backwards vocals — as the flip side of the United States hit single "Sweet Talkin' Woman" in 1978.

Classic Rock History critic Brian Kachejian rated it as ELO's 7th best song, saying that "From the song’s creepy opening to the sports-themed glass-sounding mighty guitar riff, it has remained one of the most interesting and exciting Electric Light Orchestra songs in the band’s catalog."

Stereogum contributor Ryan Reed rated it as ELO's 10th best song, saying that it "displays the complexity and widescreen scope of symphonic prog, but with a playfulness that many of the era’s legends often lacked."

Something Else! critic Mark Saleski called it "a cool song, full of weird orchestration, violently strummed guitar, fusion-esque violin, and even (in the full version) a backwards masked message."

== Backmasking ==
"Fire on High (section)"
A forward version of the start of "Fire on High"

"Fire on High (section) (reversed)"
A reversed version of the start of "Fire on High"

The album version contains an opening with a backwards message; in reverse, a masked heavy voice (that of ELO drummer Bev Bevan) says, "The music is reversible, but time is not. Turn back! Turn back! Turn back! Turn back!" Ostensibly, this was Jeff Lynne's shot at backmasking hysteria, after satanic allegations were made against their song "Eldorado" by fundamentalist Christianity members. Snippets of Messiah by Handel can be heard during the album opening as well.

Despite being almost entirely instrumental, the song's title can be faintly heard near the end of the track by the chanting chorus. During the beginning of the song, the instrumental takes inspiration from the Dies irae.

== Other uses ==
"Fire on High" was used as the opening theme for the CBS Sports Spectacular TV show in the mid-1970s. Currently, it is the opening and closing theme to "The Diner with Lou Simon," a weekly music-related talk show on SiriusXM Satellite Radio.

In 2000, the New Jersey Devils used the song, accompanied by visuals, in the opening ceremony for all their home games. Much of the song was also played prior to every Atlanta Thrashers home game.

A remix of "Fire on High" is played inside the "Astrosphere" at Funtown Splashtown USA in Saco, Maine. The attraction is a Scrambler ride inside a large dome.

"Fire on High" was also used on the indoor Scrambler ride called Gyrosphere at Sea Breeze Park in Rochester, NY from the late 70's into the mid 90's, possibly for 16-18 years.
