= National Coffee Association =

American coffee industry organization

- Formation: 1911
- Legal status: Trade association
- Purpose: Market research Consumer information Lobbying
- Region served: United States
- Members: Coffee companies
- President & CEO: William (Bill) Murray
- Website: Official website

National Coffee Association of U.S.A., Inc. (National Coffee Association or NCA) is the main market research, consumer information, and lobbying association for the coffee industry in the United States.

The association has functions and services include:

- Market and scientific research
- Domestic and international government relations, including lobbying
- Public relations and education

== History ==
The National Coffee Association was founded in 1911. It was the United States' first association for the US coffee industry, and it is one of the oldest trade associations formed in the country.

== Membership and management ==
NCA's membership comprises mainly small and mid-sized companies, including coffee growers, roasters, retailers, as well as importers/exporters and wholesaler/suppliers. This membership accounts for more than 90% of all US coffee commerce.

The Chairman of the association is Michael Gaviña with F. Gaviña & Sons, Inc.

== National Coffee Drinking Trends ==
Started in 1950, this branch of the NCA surveys coffee consumption in the United States, producing a statistical research report published annually.

== "Join the Coffee Achievers" ==
In response to twenty years of declining coffee consumption, the association launched a $20 million "Join the Coffee Achievers" advertising campaign on September 11, 1983. Aimed at the 18-to-34 age group, the television commercials featured Ken Anderson, David Bowie, Jane Curtin, Joe Jackson, Allison Roe, Cicely Tyson, Kurt Vonnegut and Heart's Ann and Nancy Wilson, and had Electric Light Orchestra's "Hold On Tight" as the theme song. The campaign was criticized by the Center for Science in the Public Interest's Michael F. Jacobson who targeted statements about coffee providing "serenity and contentment" as being incorrect and misleading.

Coffee Achievers was mentioned in the 1985 "Weird Al" Yankovic song "Dare to Be Stupid" and the 1989 Bad Religion song "Anxiety." In the 1993 LucasArts adventure game Sam & Max Hit the Road, the character Max mentions he's also a coffee achiever during various conversations.

== See also ==
- Economics of coffee
- International Coffee Agreement
- Category:Coffee organizations
