= Illusions in G Major =

- Spanish release picture sleeve

Single by Electric Light Orchestra

from the album Eldorado
- A-side: "Can't Get It Out of My Head"
- Released: 1974
- Recorded: February–August 1974
- Genre: Rock 'n' roll, hard rock
- Length: 2:37
- Label: Warner Bros. (UK); United Artists (US)
- Songwriter: Jeff Lynne
- Producer: Jeff Lynne

Electric Light Orchestra singles chronology
"Ma-Ma-Ma Belle" (1974)	"Illusions in G Major" (1974)	"Boy Blue" (1975)

Eldorado track listing
- 10 tracks Side one: 1. "Eldorado Overture"; 2. "Can't Get It Out of My Head"; 3. "Boy Blue"; 4. "Laredo Tornado"; 5. "Poor Boy (The Greenwood)"; Side two: 6. "Mister Kingdom"; 7. "Nobody's Child"; 8. "Illusions in G Major"; 9. "Eldorado"; 10. "Eldorado Finale"

"Illusions in G Major" is a song recorded by Electric Light Orchestra (ELO) and is track eight on the band's 1974 album Eldorado.

It was used as the B-side to the popular hit "Can't Get It Out of My Head", a 1975 hit in the United States. The song clocks in at 2:37, making it one of the shortest on the album. The theme of the song is about a rock star talking to his psychiatrist about his mysterious visions, he even mentions "I heard the crew a hummin' tunes that sounded like The Rolling Stones and Leonard Cohen", then also "I heard the pilot saying, poems that were written by John Keats and Robert Browning".

Rolling Stone critic Ken Barnes called it a "skillful, power-packed Fifties-style rocker with intriguing lyrics." Phonograph Record critic Michael Davis said that it "really rocks out."

It was remastered and included in 2000 by Jeff Lynne on the box set compilation Flashback.
