= Reverse speech =

Pseudoscientific claim of subconscious hidden messages

Reverse speech is a pseudoscientific topic first advocated by David John Oates which gained publicity when it was mentioned on Art Bell's nightly Coast to Coast AM radio talk show. It is based upon the theory that during spoken language production, human speakers subconsciously produce hidden messages that give insights into their innermost thoughts. Oates claims that it therefore has applications in psychotherapy, criminology and business negotiation. The theory has been rejected by mainstream science and academia.

== Claims ==
"small step for [a] man", followed by the same phrase reversed

Oates' claim is that, on average, once in every 15–20 seconds of casual conversation a person produces two related sentences—a "forward-spoken" message that is heard consciously, and a "backwards" message unconsciously embedded in the person's speech. These two modes of speech, forward and backward, are supposedly dependent upon each other and form an integral part of human communication. In the dynamics of interpersonal communication, both modes of speech combine to communicate the total psyche of the person, conscious as well as unconscious. Oates claims that backward speech is always honest and reveals the truth about the speaker's intentions and motivations. The most famous recording that allegedly demonstrates this is the speech given by Neil Armstrong at the time of the first human lunar landing on 20 July 1969. If played backwards, the words "small step for man" sound somewhat like "Man will spacewalk."

An alternative explanation for this phenomenon is pareidolia, the tendency of the human brain to perceive meaningful patterns in random noise. Pareidolia is even more likely to occur when a person consciously tries to detect a pattern, as is the case for someone listening for intelligible phrases in backwards speech. The power of suggestion is then used to nudge the listener to hear what the presenter wants him to hear. David John Oates, for example, almost always tells the listener in advance what he should expect to hear, thereby planting a suggestion that would make the listener more likely to perceive that phrase in ther recording. A study has shown that when listening to the same clips without being told in advance what to expect, listeners are much less likely to report hearing the same phrase or hearing any comprehsible words whatsoever.

== Rejection by the scientific community ==
Most academics in the field of linguistics have not paid attention to Oates' work, and it has been called a pseudoscience. For the most part, universities and research institutes have refused to test Oates' theories because of a lack of theoretical basis to make his predictions even worth testing, and the fact that many of his claims are untestable. One of the few scientific experiments to evaluate Oates' claims was undertaken at Monash University, according to a brief description in an Australian newspaper, and did not support his findings. The study tested 40 people who were unfamiliar with the concept of reverse speech, and found "there is no evidence that listeners can hear the alleged [reverse speech] sequences unless ‘prompted’ in advance" by being told there is a comprehensible message in the reversed speech samples. This study also criticized Oates's claims as lacking a rigorous methodology, lacking a basis in linguistics, and clashing with known details of cognitive development and the physiology of human voice production. Critics characterized Oates as "more interested in making a profit than educating others," pointing out the large amount of merchandise and services sold via his website.

Oates' claims about the applications of reverse speech have also been challenged. One report has questioned whether reverse speech was ever really used in police work, as Oates claimed. Likewise, his claim that reverse speech has applications in psychology and psychotherapy is not supported by mainstream research in those fields. Oates' work has been described as "dangerous" because of its potential for misuse and the likelihood of leading to false accusations of people in criminal courts, similarly to the controversial practice of facilitated communication.

Reverse speech has also been compared to the controversial field of neuro-linguistic programming. Because of the "dogmatic" tone of Oates' material, reverse speech has been compared to "fringe literature."
