= Evil Woman (Electric Light Orchestra song) =

1975 single by Electric Light Orchestra

- A-side label of the UK vinyl release

Single by Electric Light Orchestra

from the album Face the Music
- B-side: "10538 Overture (Live)"
- Released: 31 October 1975 (US); 28 November 1975 (UK)
- Recorded: 1975
- Studio: Musicland, Munich, Germany
- Genre: Progressive rock; pop rock; symphonic rock
- Length: 4:35 (Album version); 4:12 (UK single edit); 3:15 (US single edit); 5:17 (Full-length version); 5:00 (Stripped down mix)
- Label: Jet (UK); United Artists (US)
- Songwriter: Jeff Lynne
- Producer: Jeff Lynne

Electric Light Orchestra singles chronology
"Boy Blue" (1975)	"Evil Woman" (1975)	"Strange Magic" (1976)

Face the Music track listing
- 8 tracks Side one: 1. "Fire On High"; 2. "Waterfall"; 3. "Evil Woman"; 4. "Nightrider"; Side two: 5. "Poker"; 6. "Strange Magic"; 7. "Down Home Town"; 8. "One Summer Dream"

Alternative release
- Artwork for German vinyl release

Music video
- "Evil Woman" on YouTube

"Evil Woman" is a song recorded by Electric Light Orchestra (ELO) and written by lead vocalist Jeff Lynne. It was first released on the band's fifth album, 1975's Face the Music.

== Background ==
Lynne wrote the song quickly when Face the Music was almost complete but he didn't think they had a good lead single. Lynne said:

I wrote this in a matter of minutes. The rest of the album was done. I listened to it and thought, 'There’s not a good single.' So I sent the band out to a game of football and made up 'Evil Woman' on the spot. The first three chords came right to me. It was the quickest thing I’d ever done. We kept it slick and cool, kind of like an R&B song. It was kind of a posh one for me, with all the big piano solos and the string arrangement. It was inspired by a certain woman, but I can’t say who. She’s appeared a few times in my songs.

Lynne described the structure saying it has a "repetitive chord sequence and then the melody turns into a chorus."

When released as a single in late 1975, the song became the band's first worldwide hit. The song placed in the top 10 on both sides of the Atlantic in early 1976. It was released again in 1978 on The ELO EP.

The lyric "There's a hole in my head where the rain comes in" in the song is a tribute to The Beatles' song "Fixing a Hole".

== Reception ==
Billboard praised the use of the title lyrics as a hook. Cash Box noted the 20th-century influences and "commercial qualities" of the song, stating "from the classic hookline — a recurring four notes from 'Anchors Aweigh,' through an electronic schism from a dramatic TV serial two-thirds of the way through." Record World said that the song "puts rock within a classical frame and shows one of the few bands capable of a viable combination of experimentation with commerciality."

Green Bay Press-Gazette critic Warren Gerds described it as "a blend of almost-rock and almost-classical music" and said that "Some may say it's okay, even nice, rock but lousy classical music."

Ultimate Classic Rock critic Michael Gallucci rated it ELO's 3rd best song, saying that it has "old-school strings and new-school keyboards...backing a funky dance-floor beat that drives the song all the way to pop glory." Classic Rock History critic Brian Kachejian rated it as ELO's 4th best song, saying that "Jeff Lynne took a simple three-chord progression that Led Zeppelin utilized at the end of 'Stairway to Heaven,' and added his own touch, melody and production to score a huge hit." Stereogum contributor Ryan Reed rated it as ELO's 7th best song.

In 2022 Lynne listed it as one of his nine favorite ELO songs.

== Chart performance ==
=== Weekly charts ===
Chart (1975–1976)	Peak position
Australia (Kent Music Report)	23
Canada Top Singles (RPM)	6
Ireland (IRMA)	10
Netherlands (Dutch Top 40)	20
Netherlands (Single Top 100)	21
New Zealand (Recorded Music NZ)	8
UK Singles (Official Charts)	10
US Billboard Hot 100	10
US Cash Box	9
US Record World	9

=== Year-end charts ===
Chart (1976)	Rank
Canada Top Singles (RPM)	81
US Billboard	70
US Cash Box	54

== Certifications ==
Region	Certification	Certified units/sales
New Zealand (RMNZ)	Platinum	30,000^{‡}
United Kingdom (BPI)	Silver	200,000^{‡}
United States (RIAA)	Platinum	1,000,000^{‡}
^{‡} Sales+streaming figures based on certification alone.

== Jeff Lynne version ==
Jeff Lynne re-recorded the song in his own home studio. It was released in a compilation album, Mr. Blue Sky: The Very Best of Electric Light Orchestra, with other re-recorded ELO songs, under the ELO name.

== Personnel ==
- Jeff Lynne - vocals, guitars
- Richard Tandy – Keyboards
- Bev Bevan – drums, percussion, vocals
- Kelly Groucutt – Bass guitar, vocals
- Mik Kaminski – violin
- Hugh McDowell – cello
- Melvyn Gale – cello
- Ellie Greenwich - vocals
- Susan Collins – vocals

== Cover versions ==
Duran Duran released a cover version of the song on 9th October 2024 as part of the "De Luxe" edition of their sixteenth studio album Danse Macabre. This song reached number 32 in the Billboard Adult Top 40 Chart.
