= Fixing a Hole =

- Cover of the Northern Songs sheet music (licensed to Sonora Musikförlag)

Song by the Beatles

from the album Sgt. Pepper's Lonely Hearts Club Band
- Released: 26 May 1967
- Recorded: 9 and 21 February 1967
- Studio: Regent Sound and EMI, London
- Genre: Rock; baroque pop; psychedelic pop
- Length: 2:36
- Label: Parlophone
- Songwriter: Lennon–McCartney
- Producer: George Martin

"Fixing a Hole" is a song by the English rock band the Beatles from their 1967 album Sgt. Pepper's Lonely Hearts Club Band. It was written by Paul McCartney and credited to Lennon–McCartney.

== Writing ==
In a 1968 interview, McCartney said that the song was "about the hole in the road where the rain gets in, a good old analogy – the hole in your make-up which lets the rain in and stops your mind from going where it will." He went on to say that the following lines were about fans who hung around outside his home day and night, and whose actions he found off-putting: "See the people standing there / Who disagree, and never win / And wonder why they don't get in my door."

Some fans assumed the song was about heroin due to the drug slang "fixing a hole," but McCartney later said that the song was an "ode to pot". In his 1997 biography Many Years from Now, McCartney stated that "mending was my meaning. Wanting to be free enough to let my mind wander, let myself be artistic, let myself not sneer at avant-garde things."

In his 2021 book The Lyrics, McCartney revealed that the most important influence for the song was a "little blue hole" he saw while under the influence of LSD. According to McCartney, "the most important influence here was not even the metaphysical idea of a hole... but this absolutely physical phenomenon – something that first appeared after I took acid. I still see it occasionally, and I know exactly what it is. I know exactly what size it is".

== Recording ==
The first of two recording sessions for "Fixing a Hole" was at Regent Sound Studios in London on 9 February 1967, in three takes. Regent Sound was used because all three studios at EMI's Abbey Road Studios were unavailable that night, so it was the first time that the Beatles used a British studio other than Abbey Road for an EMI recording. Also present at the session was a man who had arrived at McCartney's house in St John's Wood, shortly before McCartney was due to depart for the studio, and introduced himself as Jesus Christ. McCartney later recalled:

There were a lot of casualties about then. We used to get a lot of people who were maybe insecure or going through emotional breakdowns or whatever. So I said, "I've got to go to a session but if you promise to be very quiet and just sit in a corner, you can come." So he did, he came to the session and he did sit very quietly and I never saw him after that.

The lead vocal was recorded at the same time as the rhythm track, a change from the Beatles' post-1964 approach of overdubbing the vocal. Overdubs were added to this recording on 21 February 1967 at EMI Studios. Producer George Martin played the prominent harpsichord part throughout because McCartney felt it important that he perform the bass part.

== Musical structure ==
The song alternates between the key of F minor (in the verses) and F major (in the bridges) in basically 4/4 time. The composition is structured as follows: intro, verse, verse, bridge, verse, verse (guitar solo), bridge, verse, and outro (fadeout).

The recording opens with a harpsichord playing a descending chromatic line (resembling "Michelle") in a staccato-like pattern in 4/4 time. Ringo Starr's hi-hat in the final measure of this introduction introduces a swing beat that stays for the remainder of the song. The first eight-measure verse begins with McCartney singing "I'm fixing a hole where the rain gets in". The word "fixing" here is sung to a piano F major chord but on "hole" to a C augmented chord (which includes a G♯/A♭ note that is a III (3rd) note in the thus predicted F minor scale) pivoting towards the Fm pentatonic minor scale on the more negative mood of "rain gets in". The Fm key melody in the verse is tinged both by blues flat 7th, and Dorian mode raised 6th notes. The harpsichord repeats the descending chromatic line in the F minor key in swing beat.

In the second half of the verse, McCartney's bass begins a syncopated three-note pattern that leaves the downbeat empty, meanwhile his vocal is dropping to F an octave below (on "stops my mind"), climbing back to C ("from wandering") then sailing free of the song's established octave to a high falsetto A flat on "where it will go". George Harrison enters in the seventh and eighth measure with a syncopated distorted Stratocaster with gain, treble and bass all turned up high, providing a distinctive countermelody, double-tracked phrase descending from McCartney's high A♭ vocal note through what author Jonathan Gould terms a "series of biting inversions on the tonic chord". Harrison later plays an eight-bar solo that culminates in a two-octave descent. McCartney, Lennon and Harrison sing backing vocals over the bridge.

The song's shift between minor (verse) and major (bridge) is also seen in "Norwegian Wood (This Bird Has Flown)" (verse E, chorus Em); "Michelle" (verse F, chorus Fm); "While My Guitar Gently Weeps" (bridge A, verse Am), "I Me Mine" (chorus A, verse Am), "The Fool on the Hill" (verse D, chorus Dm) and "Penny Lane" (verse [bars 1–3] B, verse [bars 4–8] Bm).

== Personnel ==
- Paul McCartney – double-tracked lead vocals, bass guitar
- John Lennon – backing vocals
- George Harrison – backing vocals, double-tracked lead guitar, maracas
- Ringo Starr – drums
- George Martin – harpsichord

Personnel per Guitar World. Other sources say McCartney played harpsichord, with Lennon covering his bass guitar part.

== Bibliography ==
- "Sergeant Pepper's 40th Anniversary". 60s Season. BBC Radio 2. 2009.
- "Sgt Pepper". Beatles Interview Database. The Beatles Interview Database. 2007.
- Everett, Walter (1999). The Beatles as Musicians: Revolver Through the Anthology. Oxford University Press. ISBN 978-0-19-512941-0.
- Gould, Jonathan (2007). Can't Buy Me Love: The Beatles, Britain and America. Piatkus.
- Lewisohn, Mark (1988). The Beatles Recording Sessions. New York City: Harmony Books. ISBN 0-517-57066-1.
- MacDonald, Ian (2005). Revolution in the Head: The Beatles' Records and the Sixties (Second Revised ed.). London: Pimlico (Rand). ISBN 1-84413-828-3.
- McCartney, Paul (2021). Muldoon, Paul (ed.). The Lyrics: 1956 to the Present. New York City: Liveright. ISBN 978-1631492563.
- Miles, Barry (1997). Paul McCartney: Many Years From Now. New York City: Henry Holt and Company. ISBN 0-8050-5249-6.
- Miles, Barry (2001). The Beatles Diary Volume 1: The Beatles Years. London: Omnibus Press. ISBN 0-7119-8308-9.
- Pedler, Dominic (2003). Songwriting Secrets of the Beatles. London: Omnibus Press.
