= Nightrider (song) =

Single by Electric Light Orchestra

from the album Face the Music
- A-side: "Do Ya" [US]
- B-side: "Daybreaker" (Live) [UK]
- Released: 19 March 1976 (UK); February 1977 (US)
- Recorded: 1975
- Studio: Musicland, Munich, Germany
- Genre: Rock
- Length: 4:25 (Album version); 3:45 (UK single edit)
- Label: Jet (UK); Jet/United Artists (US)
- Songwriter: Jeff Lynne
- Producer: Jeff Lynne

Electric Light Orchestra singles chronology
| "Strange Magic" (1976) | "Nightrider" (1976) | "Livin' Thing" (1976) |

Face the Music track listing
- 8 tracks Side one: 1. "Fire On High"; 2. "Waterfall"; 3. "Evil Woman"; 4. "Nightrider"; Side two: 5. "Poker"; 6. "Strange Magic"; 7. "Down Home Town"; 8. "One Summer Dream"

"Nightrider" is a song from Electric Light Orchestra's (ELO) album Face the Music.

The song's title is a tip of the hat to Lynne's first major band, The Nightriders. It was released in 1976 as the third single from the album in the United Kingdom. The B-side on the single was a live version of "Daybreaker" taken from the 1974 live album The Night the Light Went On in Long Beach. Despite ELO's rising popularity, and the band playing the song on Top of the Pops on 29 April 1976, the song failed to chart. The song was also included as the B-side on the US hit single "Do Ya".

Between 3:16 and 3:19, the song features a string crescendo which was reused (played backwards, from 2:40 to 2:44) on another of the album's tracks, "Evil Woman".

"I took the high string part of Nightrider that climbs up to a climax, and used it backwards in Evil Woman as a big effect. I was amazed when it slotted in seamlessly." - Jeff Lynne (Face the Music remaster liner notes)

Bassist Kelly Groucutt took the lead vocal on the second verse.

ELO biographer John Van Der Kiste described the song as "another of those deceptively simple-sounding songs with a very intricate arrangement." Van Der Kiste describes how the song moves from "plaintive keyboard" to "more forceful chorus" to "peaceful conclusion" and praises the "otherworldly strings that are incorporated into the arrangement. Barry Delve described it as a "mini-symphony" with "complex vocal arrangements and driving strings underpinning several dynamic changes." Similar to Van Der Kiste, Delve describes how the song moves from quiet introduction to galloping chorus to "dreamy conclusion."

Rolling Stone critic said that "Nightrider" reminded him of Rimsky-Korsakov's Scheherazade. Green Bay Press-Gazette critic Warren Gerds felt that ELO tried to do too much with the song, saying that "multiple musical shifts give the song a herky-jerky, disjointed effect that makes your head spin."
