= Can't Get It Out of My Head =

Song written by Jeff Lynne and originally recorded by Electric Light Orchestra

Single by Electric Light Orchestra

from the album Eldorado
- B-side: "Illusions in G Major"
- Released: November 1974 (US); January 1975 (UK)
- Recorded: 1974 De Lane Lea Studios
- Genre: Soft rock
- Length: 4:23 (Album version); 3:07 (Single edit)
- Label: Warner Bros. (UK); United Artists (US)
- Songwriter: Jeff Lynne
- Producer: Jeff Lynne

Electric Light Orchestra singles chronology
"Ma-Ma-Ma Belle" (1974)	"Can't Get It Out of My Head" (1974)	"Boy Blue" (1975)

Eldorado track listing
- 10 tracks Side one: 1. "Eldorado Overture"; 2. "Can't Get It Out of My Head"; 3. "Boy Blue"; 4. "Laredo Tornado"; 5. "Poor Boy (The Greenwood)"; Side two: 6. "Mister Kingdom"; 7. "Nobody's Child"; 8. "Illusions in G Major"; 9. "Eldorado"; 10. "Eldorado Finale"

Music video
- "Can't Get It Out of My Head" on YouTube

"Can't Get It Out of My Head" is a song written by Jeff Lynne and originally recorded by Electric Light Orchestra (also known as ELO).

First released on the band's fourth album Eldorado in September 1974, the song is the second track on the album and follows "Eldorado Overture". The song was released in November the same year as a single.

The song became the band's first top 10 single in the United States, reaching number 9, and helped boost public awareness of the band in the U.S., although the single and LP failed to chart in the UK. In 1978, it was included as the lead song on the four-track The ELO EP (UK release), reaching number 34 on the UK charts. The song has appeared on many ELO compilation albums.

== Background ==
Lynne wrote "Can't Get It Out of My Head" partially in response to his father's criticism that the previous songs he wrote did not have any tune, wanting to show that he could write a song with a beautiful melody.

Lynne has stated that the lyrics "were about a man who was dreaming, sees this vision of loveliness and wakes up and finds that he's actually a clerk working in a bank" and so will not be able to act on this dream.

== Critical reception ==
Record World said that "Jeff Lynne and company brew up a brilliant batch of hook melody strains from the last decade of ballads into one fresh triumph."

AllMusic's Mike DeGagne said the song would become "one of Electric Light Orchestra's most beautiful ballads" thanks to "the rich backdrop of strings (especially cello) and the steady, delicate cymbal taps that enhance the song's charm", adding: "there's an honest simplicity built around the dynamics of the relaxed rhythm and it's this enchanting air, mixed with the storybook lyrics and poetic wonderment of the song that carries the listener away, even if they're indecipherable at times", considering the song as "the band's best example of this recipe implemented toward a slower style".

Classic Rock History critic Brian Kachejian rated it as ELO's 10th best song, calling it a "sentimental grooving ballad." Ultimate Classic Rock critic Michael Gallucci rated it as ELO's 9th best song. Stereogum contributor Ryan Reed rated it as ELO's 4th best song.

== Personnel ==
Credits adapted from "Can't Get It Out of My Head" liner notes.

Electric Light Orchestra

- Jeff Lynne – lead vocals, guitar, Moog synthesizer, arrangements
- Richard Tandy – piano, Moog synthesizer, arrangements
- Michael De Albuquerque – bass
- Bev Bevan – drums, percussion
- Michael Edwards – cello
- Mik Kaminski – violin
- Hugh McDowell – cello

Additional musicians

- Louis Clark – orchestra conducting, arrangements

Production

- Jeff Lynne – production
- Dick Plant – engineering
- Mike Pela – engineering
- Kenny Denton – engineering assistance
- John Richards – engineering assistance

Recording

- Recorded at De Lane Lea Studios, London.

== Chart performance ==
=== Weekly charts ===
Chart (1974–1975)	Peak position
Australia Kent Music Report Singles Chart	59
Canada RPM Top Singles	25
Dutch GfK chart	20
US Billboard Hot 100	9
US Cash Box Top 100 Singles	14
US Record World Singles	23
US Radio & Records (R&R)	27

=== Year-end charts ===
Chart (1975)	Rank
Canada	185
US Billboard	81
US Opus	72

== Jeff Lynne versions ==
"Can't Get It Out of My Head"

Song by Electric Light Orchestra

from the album Mr. Blue Sky: The Very Best of Electric Light Orchestra
- Released: 8 October 2012 (UK); 9 October 2012 (US)
- Recorded: 2001–2012 Bungalow Palace
- Length: 4:35
- Label: Frontiers
- Songwriter: Jeff Lynne
- Producer: Jeff Lynne

Jeff Lynne re-recorded the song in his own home studio. It was released in a compilation album with other re-recorded ELO songs under the ELO name.

In 2012, as part of the concert from his home studio, Live From Bungalow Palace, Lynne performed an acoustic version of the song with longtime ELO pianist Richard Tandy.
