= Boy Blue (Electric Light Orchestra song) =

Single by Electric Light Orchestra

from the album Eldorado
- B-side: "Eldorado"
- Released: April 1975 (US)
- Recorded: 1974 De Lane Lea Studios
- Genre: Art rock; symphonic rock
- Length: 5:19 (Album version); 4:13 (US single edit)
- Label: United Artists
- Songwriter: Jeff Lynne
- Producer: Jeff Lynne

Electric Light Orchestra singles chronology
"Can't Get It Out of My Head" (1974)	"Boy Blue" (1975)	"Evil Woman" (1975)

Eldorado track listing
- 10 tracks Side one: 1. "Eldorado Overture"; 2. "Can't Get It Out of My Head"; 3. "Boy Blue"; 4. "Laredo Tornado"; 5. "Poor Boy (The Greenwood)"; Side two: 6. "Mister Kingdom"; 7. "Nobody's Child"; 8. "Illusions in G Major"; 9. "Eldorado"; 10. "Eldorado Finale"

"Boy Blue" is a song written by Jeff Lynne and performed by the Electric Light Orchestra (ELO) which first appeared as the third track from their 1974 album Eldorado.

== Content ==
=== Composition ===
The album version of the song starts with a Baroque-style trumpet and string quartet fanfare – reminiscent of Jeremiah Clarke's "Prince of Denmark's March" (ca. 1700) — and then develops into a minimoog sequence before the song properly begins. The song includes a midway solo of the band's three string players. At the end of the song the string instruments quickly fade, immediately leading into the LP's fourth track "Laredo Tornado".

According to Allmusic critic Michael A. Guarisco "The melody matches the fanfare of the lyrics by matching verses that have a strident sense of swing to them with a sing-along chorus built on a descending-note hook."

Bassist Mike de Albuquerque sings on the song - one of his final appearances in the ELO catalogue.

The US edited single version of the song had many of the orchestrations removed. ELO writer Barry Delve believes that edits demonstrated "how much the album version's ambitious arrangement lifts 'Boy Blue' from being a fairly standard pop song to something much more remarkable."

=== Lyrics ===
A song about an all-conquering hero from the middle ages.

— Jeff Lynne, Eldorado Remaster, 2001

The song is an anti-war song set during the Crusades and forms the second dream as part of the overall Eldorado dreamscape. It tells the story of Boy Blue, a war hero returning from a far-off war and the rapturous welcome he receives from his town folk. The chorus is made up of the town folk singing "Hey, Boy Blue is back." Boy Blue rebuffs the hero worship and declares his hatred of war, stating his refusal to ever “take up arms again”.

== Reception ==
The song was released as the second single from the Eldorado album but failed to chart. Billboard said that it had a catchy hook and a similar "smooth sound" to ELO's previous single "Can't Get It Out of My Head," and had expected it to achieve similar chart success. Cash Box said "a big symphonic sound surrounds and cushions a driving rock beat on this excellently produced Jeff Lynne track." Record World said that the song "is just familiar enough on the first listen. This azure lad brings on visions of 'Hang On Sloopy,' then heads out on its own." Rolling Stone critic Ken Barnes called it "an enjoyable, extremely simple rock number." Phonograph Record critic Michael Davis called it a "catchy, upbeat pop number" that "ain't rock'n'roll"

Allmusic critic Donald A. Guarisco described "Boy Blue" as "a densely-crafted tune that was equal parts string recital, prog-rock, and power pop" and "a smart fusion of pop, prog and rock elements that made a dynamic centerpiece for the first side of Eldorado." Guarisco believed that it "was probably a bit too ambitious to be a hit single."

The song was covered by Rick Altizer on the tribute album Lynne Me Your Ears in a harder rock style.

== Bibliography ==
- Van der Kiste, John (21 January 2017). Jeff Lynne: Electric Light Orchestra - Before and After.
- Guttenbacher, Patrik; Haines, Marc; von Petersdorff, Alexander (1996). Unexpected Messages: The Story Of The Electric Light Orchestra, The Move, Jeff Lynne, Roy Wood, Bev Bevan Including All Members and Related Artists' Projects with the Complete World Discography. ISBN 9783000006425.
