= Sweet Talkin' Woman =

Single by Electric Light Orchestra

from the album Out of the Blue
- B-side: "Bluebird Is Dead" (UK); "Fire On High" (US)
- Released: February 1978 (US); 22 September 1978 (UK)
- Genre: Pop; disco
- Length: 3:47
- Label: Jet
- Songwriter: Jeff Lynne
- Producer: Jeff Lynne

Electric Light Orchestra singles chronology
"Mr. Blue Sky" (1978)	"Sweet Talkin' Woman" (1978)	"Wild West Hero" (1978)

Alternative cover
- American single sleeve

Audio sample
- file; help

"Sweet Talkin' Woman" is a 1978 single by Electric Light Orchestra (ELO) from the album Out of the Blue (1977). Its original title was "Dead End Street", but it was changed during recording. Some words that survived from that version can be heard in the opening of the third verse, "I've been livin' on a dead end street".

The track became the third top ten hit from the LP in the UK, peaking at number 6. As a novelty, initial copies of the 12-inch and 7-inch single formats were pressed in transparent purple vinyl. "Sweet Talkin’ Woman" is written in the key of C major.

The version released in the United States was 10 seconds shorter than its British counterpart due to a slightly faster mix. In the US, it reached number 17 on the Billboard Hot 100.

== Critical reception ==
AllMusic's Donald A. Guarisco said "Sweet Talkin' Woman" was "their first real step into the disco sound [...] a string-laden pop tune whose dance-friendly edge helped it become a disco-era hit", attributing its disco sound to "Bev Bevan's steady drum work lays down a dance-friendly rhythm as pounding piano lines, delirous bursts of swirling strings, and endlessly overdubbed backing vocals mesh seamlessly to form an ornate but driving funhouse of pop hooks". Billboard described the song as a "catchy rocker characterized by semi-classical elements." Cash Box said that it has "syncopated harmonies and fullbodied instrumental accompaniments." Record World said that "rock and doo wop mix with ELO's strings and guitars in a busy but melodic way."

Ultimate Classic Rock critic Michael Gallucci rated it ELO's 6th best song, saying that it has a "one-of-a-kind chorus" and that it is "one of ELO's greatest group performances." Stereogum contributor Ryan Reed rated it as ELO's 8th best song, noting the catchy verses and choruses and the intricacy of the songwriting. Reed also suggested that it formed a template for Huey Lewis' 1982 song "Do You Believe in Love."

== Chart performance ==
=== Weekly charts ===
Chart (1978)	Peak position
Australia (Kent Music Report)	38
Belgium (Ultratop 50 Flanders)	30
Canada Top Singles (RPM)	16
Ireland (IRMA)	6
Netherlands (Dutch Top 40)	27
Netherlands (Single Top 100)	24
UK Singles (Official Charts)	6
US Billboard Hot 100	17
US Cash Box	18
US Record World	23

=== Year-end charts ===
Chart (1978)	Rank
Canada Top Singles (RPM)	125
UK Singles (Official Charts Company)	40
US Billboard	86

== Certifications ==
Region	Certification	Certified units/sales
New Zealand (RMNZ)	Gold	15,000^{‡}
United Kingdom (BPI)	Silver	250,000^{^}
United States (RIAA)	Gold	500,000^{‡}
^{^} Shipments figures based on certification alone.^{‡} Sales+streaming figures based on certification alone.
