= Eldorado (Electric Light Orchestra album) =

Studio album by Electric Light Orchestra
- Released: September 1974
- Recorded: February–August 1974
- Studios: De Lane Lea Studios, London
- Genres: Progressive pop; progressive rock
- Length: 38:42
- Labels: Warner Bros., United Artists
- Producer: Jeff Lynne

Electric Light Orchestra chronology
The Night the Light Went On in Long Beach (1974)	Eldorado (1974)	Showdown (1974)

Singles from Eldorado
- 1. "Can't Get It Out of My Head" Released: November 1974; 2. "Boy Blue" Released: April 1975

Eldorado (subtitled A Symphony by the Electric Light Orchestra) is the fourth studio album by the Electric Light Orchestra (ELO). It was released in the United States in September 1974 by United Artists Records and in the United Kingdom in October 1974 by Warner Bros. Records.

== Concept ==
Eldorado is the first complete ELO concept album; bandleader Jeff Lynne conceived the storyline before he wrote any music. The plot follows a Walter Mitty-like character who journeys into fantasy worlds via dreams, to escape the disillusionment of his mundane reality. Lynne began to write the album in response to criticisms from his father, a classical music lover, who said that Electric Light Orchestra's repertoire "had no tune".

== Recording ==
Eldorado marks the first album on which Jeff Lynne hired an orchestra; on previous albums band members would play strings using multitracked overdubbing. Louis Clark co-arranged, with Lynne (and keyboardist Richard Tandy), and conducted the strings. The group's three resident string players continued to perform on recordings, however, and can be heard most prominently on the songs "Boy Blue" and "Laredo Tornado". Mike de Albuquerque departed early on in the recording process, as touring made him feel separated from his family. Lynne plays most of, if not all, the bass tracks and backing vocals for the album, but de Albuquerque still featured on the final release as well as getting credited. Kelly Groucutt replaced him for the subsequent tour, when cellist Melvyn Gale also joined (replacing the departing Mike Edwards). "Eldorado Finale" is heavily orchestrated, much like "Eldorado Overture". Jeff Lynne said of the song, "I like the heavy chords and the slightly daft ending, where you hear the double bass players packing up their basses, because they wouldn't play another millisecond past the allotted moment."

== Cover design ==
The cover, designed by John Kehe, was taken from a still slide from the 1939 film The Wizard of Oz, and is of Dorothy's ruby slippers with the Wicked Witch of the West reaching for them.

== Release, reception and aftermath ==
Professional ratings
Review scores
Source	Rating
AllMusic	5/5 stars
Encyclopedia of Popular Music	4/5 stars
MusicHound	3/5
Music Story	4.5/5 stars
Rolling Stone	(favourable)
The Rolling Stone Album Guide	3.5/5 stars
PopMatters	(favourable)

=== Critical reception ===
Bruce Eder of AllMusic, giving a five-out-of-five-star retrospective rating, opined that "Eldorado was strongly reminiscent in some ways of Sgt. Pepper's Lonely Hearts Club Band. Not that it could ever have the same impact or be as distinctive, but it had its feet planted in so many richly melodic and varied musical traditions, yet made it all work in a rock context, that it did recall the Beatles classic." Ken Barnes of Rolling Stone said that "The Electric Light Orchestra has sometimes swamped itself in grandiose conceptions, and Eldorado (A Symphony) sounds like a prime opportunity to do it again. But thanks to strong original songs, Eldorado emerges as something of a triumph for the group."

Chuck Hicks of PopMatters wrote in his retrospective review that "Eldorado (named for the mythical, gilded king of a golden kingdom) struck a responsive chord, breaking through like sunlight on the buried desires of the discouraged and disillusioned ’70s audience. Thankfully, Sony's Epic/Legacy label has reissued a gorgeous digital remaster of this album, which will carry its timeless message to another lost generation." He continued that "Eldorado was the first of many successful ELO albums"

=== Commercial reception ===
"Can't Get It Out of My Head" was released as a single (with "Illusions in G Major" as the B-side) and was a success in the US.

=== Accolades ===
In July 2010, the album was named one of Classic Rock magazine's "50 Albums That Built Prog Rock".

On 17 June 2015, the album was ranked No. 43 on Rolling Stone's "50 Greatest Prog Rock Albums of All Time" list.

== Track listing ==
All tracks are written by Jeff Lynne.

Side one
No.	Title	Length
1.	"Eldorado Overture" (instrumental)	2:12
2.	"Can't Get It Out of My Head"	4:21
3.	"Boy Blue"	5:18
4.	"Laredo Tornado"	5:29
5.	"Poor Boy (The Greenwood)"	2:57

Side two
No.	Title	Length
6.	"Mister Kingdom"	5:50
7.	"Nobody's Child"	3:40
8.	"Illusions in G Major"	2:36
9.	"Eldorado"	5:20
10.	"Eldorado Finale"	1:20
Total length:		39:03

CD reissue bonus tracks
No.	Title	Length
11.	"Eldorado Instrumental Medley"	7:56
12.	"Dark City"	0:46

== Personnel ==
- Jeff Lynne – lead & backing vocals, electric & acoustic guitars, bass, Moog, production, orchestra & choral arrangements
- Bev Bevan – drums, percussion
- Richard Tandy – piano, Moog, clavinet, Wurlitzer electric piano, guitar, backing vocals, orchestra & choral arrangements
- Mike de Albuquerque – bass & backing vocals (credited; departed during the recording of the album)
- Mike Edwards – cello
- Mik Kaminski – violin
- Hugh McDowell – cello

Additional personnel

- Peter Forbes-Robertson – spoken word
- Louis Clark – orchestra and choral arrangements and conducting
- Al Quaglieri – reissue producer (2001)

== Charts ==
=== Weekly charts ===
Chart (1974–1975)	Peak position
Australian Albums (Kent Music Report)	40
Canada Top Albums/CDs (RPM)	7
Dutch Albums (Album Top 100)	4
Finnish Albums (The Official Finnish Charts)	18
New Zealand Albums (RMNZ)	30
US Billboard 200	16
US CashBox Top 100 Albums	16

=== Year-end charts ===
Chart (1975)	Peak position
US Billboard Year-End	30

== Certifications ==
Region	Certification	Certified units/sales
Canada (Music Canada)	Platinum	100,000^{^}
United States (RIAA)	Gold	500,000^{^}
^{^} Shipments figures based on certification alone.
