= The Move discography =

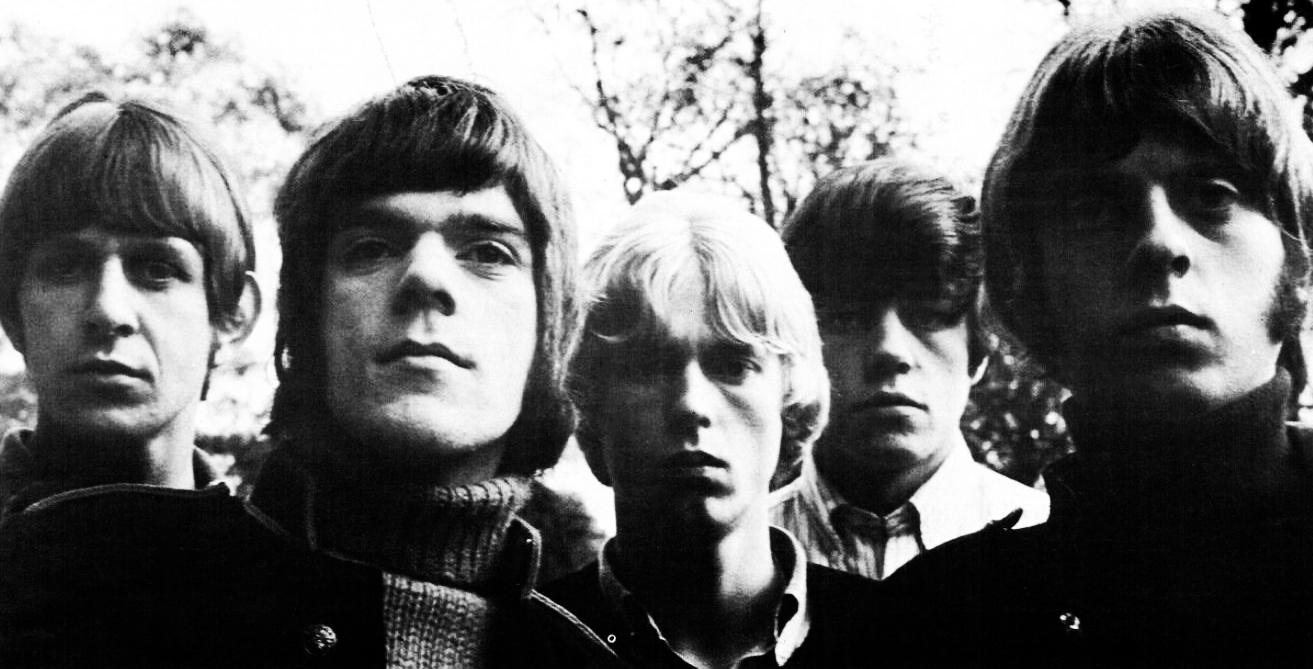
- Studio albums: 4
- EPs: 1
- Live albums: 1
- Compilation albums: 20
- Singles: 18

The discography of British rock band the Move consists of four studio albums, one live album, 20 compilation albums, one extended play, and 18 singles. The band's first two singles, "Night of Fear" and "I Can Hear the Grass Grow" were big hits in the United Kingdom, of which Night of Fear had peaked at position number 2 and I Can Hear the Grass Grow had peaked at number 5 on the UK singles chart. In 1968, the band released their self-titled debut studio album, which reached number 15 on the UK Albums Chart and garnered two more hit singles, "Flowers in the Rain" and "Fire Brigade", which, like the previous two non-album singles, had prospered in the top 10 of the UK singles chart, through which "Flowers in the Rain" had peaked at number 2 and "Fire Brigade" had peaked at number 3.

The band's next UK single, "Wild Tiger Woman" was a hit parade disappointment, which only peaked at position number 53. Because of this, the band announced that they would break up if their next single did as poorly. This was not the case, as the single that followed, "Blackberry Way" had peaked at the top of the UK chart, and the next single, "Curly", which had reached position number 12, had prospered much better than "Wild Tiger Woman". Despite these successes, the band's second studio album, Shazam, released in 1970, did not make the UK Albums Chart.

The band released two more studio albums, Looking On and Message from the Country, which also did not make the charts, and while the lead single for the former, "Brontosaurus" hit number 7 on the UK singles chart, the second and final single from the album, "When Alice Comes Back to the Farm", did not chart at all in the UK, and Message from the Country did not have a single release, with the planned "Ella James" single being withdrawn. Three more singles from the band did reach the chart, including "Tonight" at number 11, "Chinatown" at number 23, and "California Man" at number 7, although the band's final single, "Do Ya" would also not chart, other than a position at number 93 on the US Billboard Hot 100.

The band broke up shortly afterwards, with members Bev Bevan, Roy Wood, and Jeff Lynne forming the hit band Electric Light Orchestra alongside Move associate Richard Tandy, with Move manager Don Arden becoming the manager for the new band. Wood, after leaving ELO, formed Wizzard, which were also successful. Meanwhile, the Move's final charting projects, the compilation albums Split Ends and The Best of the Move would be the band's only charting albums in the United States, although they charted considerably low, at number 172 and 205 respectively.

== Albums ==
=== Studio albums ===
Title	Album details	Peak chart positions
Title	Album details	UK
Move	Released: April 1968; Label: Regal Zonophone; Formats: LP, MC, reel-to-reel	15
Shazam	Released: 27 February 1970; Label: Regal Zonophone; Formats: LP, MC	—
Looking On	Released: 11 December 1970; Label: Fly, Capitol; Formats: LP, MC, 8-track	—
Message from the Country	Released: June 1971; Label: Harvest, Capitol; Formats: LP, MC, 8-track	—
"—" denotes releases that did not chart.

=== Live albums ===
Title	Album details
Live at the Fillmore 1969	Released: 13 February 2012; Label: Right Recordings; Formats: 2xCD

=== Compilation albums ===
Title	Album details	Peak chart positions
Title	Album details	US
Flyback 3: The Best of the Move	Released: March 1971; Label: Fly; Formats: LP, 8-track; Also released as Fire Brigade on Music For Pleasure (1972)	—
Split Ends	Released: December 1972; Label: United Artists; Formats: LP, reel-to-reel; US and Canada-only release	172
The Best of the Move	Released: May 1974; Label: A&M; Formats: 2xLP; US, Canada and Japan-only release	205
California Man	Released: October 1974; Label: Harvest; Formats: LP, MC	—
The Greatest Hits Vol. 1	Released: May 1978; Label: Pickwick; Formats: LP, MC, 8-track	—
(Shines On)	Released: September 1979; Label: Harvest; Formats: LP, MC	—
The Platinum Collection of the Move	Released: November 1981; Label: Cube; Formats: 2xLP	—
Off the Record with the Move	Released: November 1984; Label: Sierra; Formats: LP, MC	—
The Move Collection	Released: July 1986; Label: Castle Communications; Formats: CD, 2xLP, MC	—
The Best of the Move	Released: February 1991; Label: Music Club; Formats: CD, MC	—
The Early Years	Released: 9 November 1992; Label: Dojo; Formats: CD, MC	—
Great Move! The Best of the Move	Released: 1994; Label: EMI/United Artists; Formats: CD; US-only release	—
Looking Back… The Best of the Move	Released: 20 April 1998; Label: Music Club; Formats: CD	—
The BBC Sessions	Released: 1995; Label: Band of Joy; Formats: CD	—
Movements – 30th Anniversary Anthology	Released: March 1998; Label: Westside; Formats: 3xCD	—
Omnibus – The 60's Singles A's and B's	Released: August 1999; Label: Edsel; Formats: CD	—
The Complete Singles Collection & More	Released: 2000; Label: Crimson; Formats: CD	—
Anthology 1966–1972	Released: October 2008; Label: Salvo; Formats: 4xCD	—
The Very Best of the Move	Released: 2 March 2009; Label: Salvo; Formats: CD	—
Magnetic Waves of Sound – The Best Of	Released: 27 January 2017; Label: Esoteric Recordings; Formats: CD+DVD	—
"—" denotes releases that did not chart or were not released in that territory.

== EPs ==
Title	EP details
Something Else from the Move	Released: 21 June 1968; Label: Regal Zonophone; Formats: 7"

== Singles ==
Title	Year	Peak chart positions										Album
Title	Year	UK	AUS	BEL (FL)	BEL (WA)	CAN	GER	IRE	NL	NZ	US	Album
"Night of Fear" b/w "Disturbance"	1966	2	42	—	—	—	30	6	18	2	—	Non-album singles
"I Can Hear the Grass Grow" b/w "Wave the Flag and Stop the Train"	1967	5	—	14	22	—	—	21	—	17	—	Non-album singles
"Flowers in the Rain" b/w "(Here We Go Round) The Lemon Tree"	1967	2	8	13	17	—	19	4	5	1	—	Move
"Cherry Blossom Clinic" (withdrawn) b/w "Vote for Me"	1967	—	—	—	—	—	—	—	—	—	—	Move
"Fire Brigade" b/w "Walk Upon the Water"	1968	3	72	—	—	36	28	9	—	9	—	Move
"Yellow Rainbow" (US and Australia-only release) b/w "Something"	1968	—	—	—	—	—	—	—	—	—	—	Move
"Wild Tiger Woman" b/w "Omnibus"	1968	53 (Note: Chart position is from the official UK "Breakers List".)	—	—	—	—	—	—	—	—	—	Non-album single
"The Girl Outside" (Japan-only release) b/w "Cherry Blossom Clinic"	1968	—	—	—	—	—	—	—	—	—	—	Move
"Blackberry Way" b/w "Something"	1968	1	14	13	20	—	7	2	14	10	—	Non-album singles
"Curly" b/w "This Time Tomorrow"	1969	12	—	20	38	—	17	12	—	18	—	Non-album singles
"Brontosaurus" b/w "Lightnin' Never Strikes Twice"	1970	7	—	—	—	36	—	—	—	—	—	Looking On
"When Alice Comes Back to the Farm" b/w "What?"	1970	—	—	—	—	—	—	—	—	—	—	Looking On
"Turkish Tram Conductor Blues" (Germany-only release) b/w "Beautiful Daughter"	1971	—	—	—	—	—	—	—	—	—	—	Looking On
"Ella James" (withdrawn) b/w "No Time"	1971	—	—	—	—	—	—	—	—	—	—	Message from the Country
"Tonight" b/w "Don't Mess Me Up"	1971	11	89	—	48	—	19	18	29	—	—	Non-album single
"Chinatown" b/w "Down on the Bay"	1971	23	—	—	—	—	—	—	—	—	—	Non-album singles
"California Man" b/w "Do Ya"/"Ella James"	1972	7	—	—	39	—	45	15	—	—	—	Non-album singles
"Do Ya" (US and Canada-only release) b/w "California Man"	1972	—	—	—	—	—	—	—	—	—	93	Non-album singles
"Do Ya" (UK release) b/w "No Time"	1974	—	—	—	—	—	—	—	—	—	—	Non-album single
"—" denotes releases that did not chart or were not released in that territory.
