= List of the Move members =

Members of the British rock band the Move

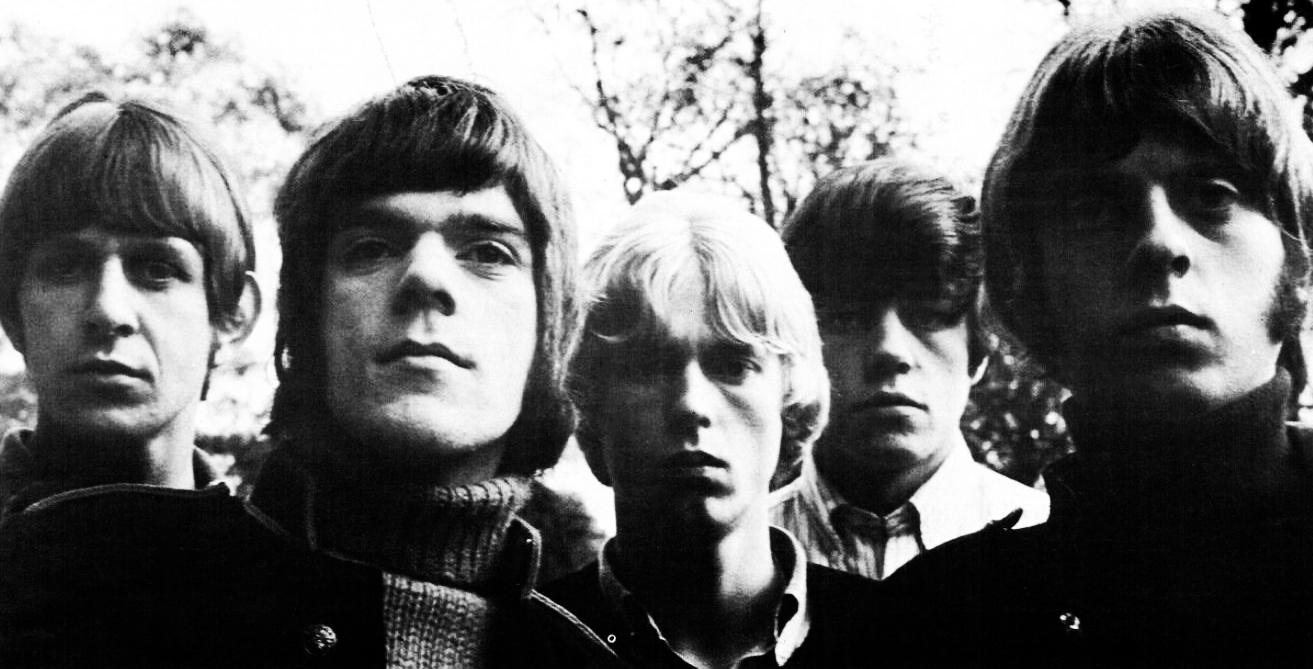

The Move were a British rock band formed in December 1965. They scored nine top 20 UK singles in five years, but were among the most popular British bands not to find any real success in the United States. Although bassist-vocalist Chris "Ace" Kefford was the original leader, for most of their career the Move was led by guitarist, singer and songwriter Roy Wood. He wrote all the group's UK singles and, from 1968, also sang lead vocals on many songs, although Carl Wayne was the main lead singer up to 1970. Initially, the band had 4 main vocalists (Wayne, Wood, Trevor Burton and Kefford) who split the lead vocals on a number of their earlier songs.

The Move evolved from several mid-1960s Birmingham based groups, including Carl Wayne & the Vikings, the Nightriders and the Mayfair Set. Their name referred to the move various members of these bands made to form the group. Besides Wood, the Move's original five-piece roster in 1965 was drummer Bev Bevan, bassist Kefford, vocalist Carl Wayne and guitarist Trevor Burton. The final line-up of 1972 was the trio of Wood, Bevan and Jeff Lynne; together, they rode the group's transition into the Electric Light Orchestra. Between 2007 and 2014, Burton and Bevan performed intermittently as "The Move featuring Bev Bevan and Trevor Burton."

== Members ==
=== Official ===
Image	Name	Years active	Instruments	Release contributions
	Bev Bevan	1965–1972; 1981; 2004–2014	drums; percussion; vocals	all releases
	Roy Wood	1965–1972; 1981	lead and rhythm guitar; keyboards; vocals; bass; saxophones	all releases
	Carl Wayne	1965–1970 (died 2004)	vocals	Move (1968); Shazam (1970)
	Trevor Burton	1965–1969; 2007–2014 (guest 2006–2007)	guitars; vocals; bass (1968–1969)	Move (1968)
	Ace Kefford	1965–1968; 1981	bass; vocals	Move (1968)
	Rick Price	1969–1971 (died 2022)	bass; vocals	Shazam (1970); Looking On (1970)
	Jeff Lynne	1969–1972	rhythm and lead guitar; keyboards; vocals; bass; drums	Looking On (1970); Message from the Country (1971)
	Neil Lockwood	2004–2014	keyboards; vocals	none
	Phil Tree	2004–2014	bass	none
	Phil Bates	2004–2007	vocals; rhythm and lead guitar	none
	Gordon Healer	2007–2014	rhythm guitar; vocals	none
	Tony Kelsey	2014	rhythm guitar; vocals	none
	Abby Brant	2014	keyboards; vocals	none

=== Touring ===
Image	Name	Years active	Instruments	Release contributions
	Richard Tandy	1968–1969; 1971–1972 (died 2024)	keyboards; bass	"Blackberry Way" (1968; single)
	Bill Hunt	1971–1972	keyboards	Message from the Country (1971; one track)

== Lineups ==
Period	Members	Releases
December 1965 – March 1968	Carl Wayne – vocals; Roy Wood – lead guitar, keyboards, vocals; Trevor Burton – rhythm guitar, vocals; Ace Kefford – bass, vocals; Bev Bevan – drums, vocals, percussion	"Night of Fear" (1966; single); "I Can Hear the Grass Grow" (1967; single); Move (1968)
March 1968 – March 1969	Carl Wayne – vocals; Roy Wood – lead guitar, keyboards, vocals; Trevor Burton – bass, rhythm guitar, vocals; Bev Bevan – drums, backing vocals, percussion; –: Richard Tandy – keyboards, bass (touring member from July 1968)	"Wild Tiger Woman" (1968; single) "Blackberry Way" (1968; single)
March 1969 – February 1970	Carl Wayne – vocals; Roy Wood – guitar, keyboards, vocals; Bev Bevan – drums, backing vocals, percussion; Rick Price – bass, backing vocals	"Curly" (1969; single; Shazam (1970)
February 1970 – January 1971	Roy Wood – lead guitar, vocals, saxophones, cello; Bev Bevan – drums, backing vocals, percussion; Rick Price – bass, backing vocals; Jeff Lynne – rhythm guitar, keyboards, vocals	Looking On (1970)
February 1971 – July 1972	Roy Wood – lead guitar, vocals, bass, saxophones, woodwinds; Bev Bevan – drums, vocals, percussion; Jeff Lynne – rhythm guitar, keyboards, bass, vocals; –: Richard Tandy – bass (touring member from October 1971); Bill Hunt – keyboards (touring member from October 1971)	Message from the Country (1971); "Chinatown" (1971; single); "California Man" (1972; single)
April 28, 1981 (one-off)	Roy Wood – guitar, vocals; Bev Bevan – drums, backing vocals; Ace Kefford – bass, vocals	none
Band disbanded between 1972–2004
July 2004 – July 2007	Bev Bevan – drums, vocals, percussion; Phil Bates – vocals, guitar; Phil Tree – bass; Neil Lockwood – keyboards, vocals; –: Trevor Burton – rhythm guitar, vocals (frequent guest)	none
July 2007 – March 2014	Bev Bevan – drums, vocals, percussion; Trevor Burton – lead guitar, vocals; Phil Tree – bass; Neil Lockwood – keyboards, vocals; Gordon Healer – rhythm guitar, vocals	none
March – May 2014	Bev Bevan – drums, vocals, percussion; Trevor Burton – lead guitar, vocals; Phil Tree – bass; Tony Kesley – rhythm guitar, vocals; Abby Brant – keyboards, vocals	none
