= My Marge =

1971 single by The Move

Single by The Move

from the album Message from the Country
- A-side: "Tonight"
- Released: June 1971
- Recorded: 1971
- Studio: Philips Studios
- Length: 1:59; 2:18 (alternative session version)
- Label: Harvest (UK); United Artists, Capitol (US)
- Songwriters: Roy Wood, Jeff Lynne
- Producers: Roy Wood, Jeff Lynne

The Move singles chronology
"When Alice Comes Back to the Farm" (1970)	"My Marge" (1971)	"Chinatown" (1971)

"My Marge" is a song performed by English group The Move for their final album Message from the Country, where it was the 10th and final track. The song was written and produced by both Roy Wood and Jeff Lynne, and recorded at Phillips Studios in 1971. In the U.S., it was released as a B-side to the band's non-album single "Tonight", which was later released as a bonus track to the 1998 reissue of the album, alongside an "alternative session version", which appeared as a hidden track to end the reissue. The song is known for its McCartney-esque influence, and its megaphonic sound.
