= The Boys (English band The Boys album) =

Studio album by the Boys
- Released: 23 September 1977
- Studio: Utopia (London)
- Genres: Punk rock, pop punk
- Length: 30:33
- Label: NEMS
- Producers: Matt Dangerfield; Casino Steel

The Boys chronology
The Boys (1977)	Alternative Chartbusters (1978)

Singles from The Boys
- 1. "I Don't Care / Soda Pressing" Released: 1977; 2. "First Time" Released: 1977

Professional ratings
Review scores
Source	Rating
AllMusic	4/5 stars
Q	3/5 stars
Sounds	4.5/5 stars
Uncut	8/10

The Boys is the debut studio album by English punk rock band the Boys, released in 1977.

== Background ==
After leaving London SS, vocalist and guitarist Matt Dangerfield and keyboardist Casino Steel formed the Boys in London in 1976; the line-up also featured guitarist "Honest" John Plain, bassist Duncan "Kid" Reid, and drummer Jack Black. Throughout the year and 1977, the band played shows before signing to NEMS Records. "I Don't Care", the band's debut single, was released in April 1977, followed by "First Time" in July 1977, prior to their self-titled debut studio album in November 1977.

== Track listing ==
All tracks are written by Casino Steel and Matt Dangerfield; except where indicated.

Side A
No.	Title	Writer(s)	Lead vocals	Length
1.	"Sick On You"	Andrew Matheson, Steel	Kid Reid	2:06
2.	"I Call Your Name"	John Lennon, Paul McCartney	Matt Dangerfield	2:08
3.	"Tumble With Me"	Matheson, Steel	Reid	1:56
4.	"Tonight"		Dangerfield	1:25
5.	"I Don't Care"		Reid	2:27
6.	"Soda Pressing"		Dangerfield	2:28
7.	"No Money"		Dangerfield	1:47

Side B
No.	Title	Writer(s)	Lead vocals	Length
1.	"First Time"	Plain	Reid	2:19
2.	"Box Number"		Reid	2:33
3.	"Kiss Like a Nun"		Dangerfield	2:05
4.	"Cop Cars"		Reid	3:47
5.	"Keep Running"		Dangerfield	1:48
6.	"Tenement Kids"		Dangerfield	1:35
7.	"Living in the City"		Dangerfield	2:09
Total length:				30:33

== Personnel ==
- Matt Dangerfield – guitar, lead and backing vocals
- Honest John Plain – guitar, backing vocals
- Casino Steel – piano, backing vocals
- Kid Reid – bass, backing and lead vocals
- Jack Black – drums

== Charts ==
Chart (1977)	Peak position
UK Albums (Official Charts)	50
