= Stein Groven =

Norwegian keyboard player and singer (born 1952)

- Also known as: Casino Steel
- Born: Stein Groven; 22 February 1952 (age 74); Trondheim, Norway
- Genres: Punk rock; New wave; Rock music; Country music
- Occupations: Keyboard player; singer; songwriter
- Years active: 1971–present
- Member of: The Boys
- Formerly of: Hollywood Brats, London SS, Claudia/Big Hand/Casino, CCCP, 1st Revolution Orchestra, The Last Rock'N'Roll Band, The Mattless Boys

Stein Groven (born 22 February 1952), better known by his stage name Casino Steel, is a Norwegian-born keyboard player, singer and songwriter.

He has played in several different bands and collaborations within rock, punk rock and country in Norway, United Kingdom and the US, and has released several solo albums. He was inducted into the Norwegian Rockheim Hall of Fame in September 2021.

== Background ==
Stein Groven grew up in Trondheim, Norway. From the age of 15 he played in various local bands, including Jane where his friend Geir Waade played drums. A few months before his 18th birthday Stein moved to London where both he and his friend Geir became active in the local music scene.

== London years ==
In London, Stein joined the band The Queen, which after an argument with Freddie Mercury was renamed Hollywood Brats. When the band split up he briefly played with his friend Geir Waade in the band London SS before joining The Boys, which are still active. The Boys also released several Christmas themed recordings under the name The Yobs.

== Later career ==
The Boys disbanded in 1982 and around this time Stein moved back to Norway where he was later joined by his friend Gary Holton, with whom he released four albums at the start of the 1980s. The collaboration was very successful in Norway but went unnoticed in other countries.

In 1983 he started a collaboration with Norwegian artists Claudia Scott and Ottar "Big Hand" Johansen in the country trio Claudia / Big Hand / Casino. The trio released three records. They received the Norwegian music award Spellemannprisen in 1985 in the category roots & country for the album Oh Yeah! and was nominated for the Spellemannprisen in 1984 in the category country and western for Fools Never Learn.

The collaboration with Claudia Scott continued beyond the 1980s, first as a duo and then in the band CCCP where Carlene Carter and John Payne were also members. In 1990, he released his first solo album, which was named Casino Steel. The following year he started the record company Revolution Records. In 2007, he started The Last Rock 'N' Roll Band together with, among others, Honest John Plain from The Boys.

Stein Groven received the veteran award at the Norwegian Gammleng Award in 2019 and was nominated for the Rockheim Hall of Fame in 2018 and 2019 before being inducted in 2021.

In 2002, he was sentenced to 120 days in prison for fraud in the Norwegian recording artist organisation GramArt where Stein Groven was the chairman of the board. The case received a lot of attention in the Norwegian media, as a number of well-known Norwegian musicians participated as witnesses.

In February 2022 Casino Steel was joined by many of his past bandmates and others he has worked with for a concert held in Olavshallen in his home town of Trondheim to celebrate his 70th birthday.

== The Boys reunion ==
In 1999 Stein Groven and most of the original members of The Boys reformed the band and they have remained active since then, mainly playing small shows in various locations in Europe and the Far East. The band released the album Punk Rock Menopause in 2014 where Stein (Casino Steel) co-composed all the songs. And they released the singles "I'm A Believer" and "Organ Grinder" in 2021 and 2023 respectively.

== Discography ==
Albums

- Steelworks (1983)
- Scott & Steel (1988), with Claudia Scott
- Casino Steel (1990)
- Casino Steel & The Bandits (1991)
- The Wonderful World of Mr. Casino Steel (1991)
- Oh Boy! (1992)
- Casino Steel With The Hollywood Brats, The Boys, Gary Holton etc. (1992)
- V.S.O.P. (2001)
- There's a Tear in My Beer (2005)
- Past the Point of No Return (2012)
- "60" (2012)

Singles / EPs

- This Ain't America/I Ain't Coming Back (1988)
- Do You Believe In Love/What's the Matter (1988)
- Little Rebel/Party Crashin (1990)
- Dance Naked With Me/Blowing the Dust Off the Angels Wings (1990)
- Heroine/When You Walk In the Room (1991)
- Røde kort (2002), med Trond Ingebretsen
- What a Wonderful World (2005)
- There's a Tear in My Beer (2005)
- (Lord, Help Me Through) Christmas Day (2009)
- C'est la vie (You Never Can Tell) (2012)
- Carmelita (2013), med Claudia Scott
- I Don't Wanna Talk About It (2018), med Hans Petter Baarli
- Mary Ellen Jones (2022), med Hard Luck Street

=== Hollywood Brats ===
Albums

- Grown Up Wrong (1975) (Norwegian exclusive release), with Andrew Matheson
- The Hollywood Brats (1980) (international reissue of Grown Up Wrong)
- Whatever Happened to The Hollywood Brats (1986)
- Sick on You (2016)

Singles

- "Then He Kissed Me"/"Sick on You" (1979)
- "Rough Mixes" (1984)
- "Little Ol' Wine Drinker Me"/"Suckin' on Suzie" (1986)
- "Zurich 17"/"Nightmare" (2005)

=== The Boys ===
Albums

- The Boys (1977)
- Alternative Chartbusters (1978)
- To Hell with The Boys (1979)
- Boys Only (1981)
- Live at The Roxy Club, April '77 (1990)
- To Hell with The Boys – The Original Mix (1990)
- Odds and Sods (1990)
- The Boys/Alternative Chartbusters (1991)
- BBC Radio 1 Live In Concert (1993)
- To Hell with The Boys/Boys Only (1994)
- The Best of The Boys (1995)
- Complete Boys Punk Singles Collection (1996)
- Power Cut (1997)
- The BBC Sessions (1999)
- The Peel Sessions (1999)
- The Boys In Concert (1999)
- The Very Best of The Boys (1999)
- Sick on You (1999)
- Punk Rock Rarities (1999)
- To Original Hell With/Odds N Sods (2000)
- Live and Unplugged: Leads 3 Amps. United 0 (2000, The Yobs)
- The Worst of The Yobs (2001)
- The Collection (2003)
- I Don't Care (The Nems Records Years) (2004)
- The Punk Rock Anthology (2008)
- Punk Rock Menopause (2014)
- Undercover – Live in China (2015)
- Made In China (2015)
- Terminal Love (2021)

Singles

- I Don't Care/Soda Pressing (1977)
- First Time (1977)
- Run Rudolph Run/The Worm Song (1977)
- Brickfield Nights/Teacher's Pet (1978)
- Silent Night/Stille Nacht (1978)
- Kamikaze/Bad Day (1979)
- Rub-a-Dum-Dum/Another Christmas (1979, som The Yobs)
- You Better Move On/Schoolgirls (1980)
- Terminal Love/Love Me (1980)
- Weekend/Cool (1980)
- Let It Rain/Lucy (1981)
- Sick On You/Soda Pressing (1999)
- Svengerland/Only a Game (2002)
- Jimmy Brown (2008)
- I'm A Believer (2021)
- Organ Grinder (2023)

=== The Yobs ===
Albums

- The Yobs' Christmas Album (1979)
- The Yobs' Xmas 11 (1991)
- The Yobs' Leads 3 Amps Utd 0 (1995)
- The Yobs' The Worst of the Yobs (2001)

Singles

- "Run Rudolph Run" / "The Worm Song" (1977)
- "Silent Night" / "Stille Nacht" (1978)
- "Rub-A-Dum-Dum" / "Another Christmas" (1979)
- "Yobs on 45" / "The Ballad of the Warrington" (1981)

=== With Gary Holton ===
Albums

- Gary Holton and Casino Steel (1981)
- Part II (1982)
- III Edition (1982)
- Best of Gary Holton and Casino Steel (1984)
- No. 4 (1984)
- We Did It Our Way (1986)
- The Best (1989)
- Ruby – The Very Best of Gary Holton & Casino Steel (1995)
- Anthology (2010)

Singles

- Ruby, Don't Take Your Love to Town/Good Ol' Gary (1981)
- No Reply/What Looks Best on You (1982)
- She's Got Balls/On the Rig (1982)
- Blackberry Way/Candy (1982)
- Thinking of You/Good Ol' Gary (1982)
- Baby I Love You/I Wish I Was an Angel (1984)
- Baby I Love You/Blue Eyed Blonde (1984)
- People In Love/Pick Me Up (1986)
- Runaway/She's No Angel (1989)
- Ruby (Don't Take Your Love to Town) (2010)

=== Claudia/Big Hand/Casino ===
Albums

- Will the Circle Be Unbroken (1983)
- Fools Never Learn (1984)
- Oh Yeah! (1985)
- Honky Tonk Night – The Best of Claudia/Big Hand/Casino (2009)

Singles

- Honky Tonk Night/Barroom Roses (1985)

=== CCCP ===
Albums

- Let's Spend the Night Together! (1986)

=== 1st Revolution Orchestra ===
Albums 1st Revolution Orchestra (1991)

=== The Last Rock'N'Roll Band ===
Albums The Last Rock'N'Roll Band (2007)

=== The Mattless Boys ===
Albums The Mattless Boys (2010)

=== Appearances and Collaborations ===
- 1977–2010 (2010), with Stiffs, Boss Martians, Arctic Depression
- RCA Victor: Punk Collection (1977)
- RCA Victor: English Waves! (1978)
- Jem Records: Teenage Party (1978)
- Futura: Pop på pulsen (1979)
- Polydor Records: 20 of Another Kind (1979)
- Music for Pleasure: We Do'em Our Way (1980)
- Pete Stride & John Plain: Laugh at Me/Jimmy Brown (1980)
- Pete Stride & John Plain: New Guitars In Town (1980)
- The Kids: Norske jenter (1980)
- Gary Holton: Ruby (Don't Take Your Love to Town)/Listen/Love Is Young (1980)
- The Young Lords: The Young Lords EP (1980)
- VG: På gang 1 (1981)
- The Kids: Svenska tjejer/Cool (1981)
- New Noise Records: Big Voice of New Noise (1981)
- Saturday Cowboys: Human Cut-Out/Move It Over (1981)
- Home's Musikk: Gullkassetten 81 (1981)
- Det Nye: Hett fett & svett (1981)
- Saturday Cowboys: We Like to Watch (1981)
- X Records: An X-tra for X-Perts (1981)
- The Kids: Hon är förälskad i lärar'n (1981)
- VG: På gang 3 (1981)
- Det Nye: Rock'n Disco 1 (1981)
- Mariann Records: Alle menn vol. 4 (1981)
- Philips: Power Pop 82/1 (1982)
- VG: På gang 5 (1982)
- Cherry Red: Burning Ambitions: A History of Punk (1982)
- K-Tel: Double Hits (1982)
- Det Nye: Hett, fett & svett 2 (1982)
- VG: På gang 8 (1982)
- Philips: En enda lysere idé fra Philips (1983)
- Marith Endresen: Good Girl Gone Bad (1983)
- Se og Hør: Se og Hør: Country Show (1983)
- Postsparebanken: Hallo i luren (1983)
- VG: På gang 11 (1983)
- Trygg Trafikk: Helikopter Jon (1984)
- Tiedemanns: De gamle løver rører på seg... (1984)
- Mariann Records: Momarkedet Vol. 2 (1984)
- VG: På gang 14 (1984)
- Big Hand Records: The New Outlaws (1984)
- Reader's Digest: One For the Road (1984)
- Cherry Red: Give Me Some Cherry (1984)
- NÅ: NÅ Meloditoppen 4 (1984)
- Reader's Digest: Mer "køntri" (1984)
- A/S Grappa: Mesterhuskassetten (1984)
- Reader's Digest: Det beste fra norsk country (1985)
- Cambra: Viva la Revolution! (1985)
- Family 5: Stein des Anstoßes (1985)
- Big Hand Records: Countryfestival Skjåk '85 (1985)
- Forente artister: Sammen for livet/Ikke gråt, Afrika (1985)
- Forente artister: Sammen for livet (1985)
- Bahama Records: Norsktopper 1985: Originale norske artister! (1985)
- VG: På gang 20: Jubileumskassetten (1985)
- Claudia Scott: Rock'n Roll Band (1986)
- Melodi Grand Prix 1986: Norsk Grand Prix '86 (1986)
- Gary Holton: People In Love/Angel (1986)
- VG: På gang 23 (1986)
- Gary Holton: Gary Holton (1986)
- The Grønne Glitrende 3 og Dag: Grønne Glitrende 3 & Dag (1986)
- VG: På gang 24 (1986)
- MBC Records: Punk: A World History (1987)
- Ottar «Big Hand» Johansen: I'm Still Your Fool/Rough Norwegian Roads (1987)
- The Coast: Nine to Four/Mr. Tambourine Man (1987)
- Ottar «Big Hand» Johansen: Big Hand (1987)
- VG: På gang 31 (1988)
- Stephen Ackles: Stephen Ackles and The Memphis News (1988)
- Castle Communications: The Best of 20 of Another Kind (1989)
- Amnesty International: Time to Take a Stand (1989)
- Totenschlager: Jørgen Engum A/S (1990)
- White Canyon: White Canyon (1990)
- FINA: Opaas Trafikkskole (1990)
- NMK: NMK Vikedalkassetten (1990)
- Pojat: Pojat (1990)
- Polarvox: Rocksuosikit soimaan 1 (1990)
- Receiver Records: Nice Enough to Eat (1991)
- Ottar "Big Hand" Johansen: The 16 Very Best (1991)
- Music Club: Punk (1991)
- Frank Aleksandersen: Rundt i ring (1991)
- VIF Fotball: Vålerenga Vål'enga 91 (1991)
- Totenschlager: Borettslag Oslo (1991)
- Streetlink: The Great British Punk Rock Explosion (1991)
- Plateselskapet: På vei te Ullevål (1991)
- Pojat: Pasi virtanen/B-5 (1991)
- Henning Kvitnes: Songs People Play (1991)
- Connoisseur Collection: The Indie Scene '77: The Story of British Independent Music (1991)
- Die Toten Hosen: Learning English, Lesson One (1991)
- Pojat: Irti (1992)
- Totenschlager: Bodø Taxisentral (1992)
- Streetlink: The Great British Punk Rock Explosion Volume 2 (1992)
- See for Miles Records: Your Starter For Ten... The See For Miles 10th Anniversary Sampler (1992)
- MG Records: Punk Compilation Vol. 1 (1992)
- Backstreet Girls: Let's Have It (1992)
- Die Toten Hosen: Demos and Outtakes (1992)
- Rhino Records: DIY: Teenage Kicks – UK Pop I (1976–79) (1993)
- Stephen Ackles: Rarities vol. 1 (1993)
- Anagram Records: Burning Ambitions – A History of Punk Vol. 2 (1993)
- Trøste & Bære: To på topp (1993)
- Revolution Records: Completely Rock'n'Roll Vol. 1 (1994)
- Music Club: Punk Vol. 1: Loud and Angry (1994)
- Sony Music Entertainment/PolyGram: Norske hits 1980–1989 – 38 pop & rock klassikere (1994)
- Karussell: Norsk pop 1980–1989 (1994)
- Emporio: Indie Punk Classics (1994)
- Receiver Records: Kamikaze: 20 Punk Classics (1994)
- Andrew Matheson: Night of the Bastard Moon (1994)
- The Problematics & Snotboy: The Problematics/Snotboy77 (1994)
- Revolution Records: Completely Rock'n'Roll Vol. II – The Ballads (1994)
- Revolution Records: Whale Meat Again! (1994)
- Music Club: Punk Vol. 3: Raw and Live (1994)
- Merry Records: Perfectly Stoned (1995)
- Ottar «Big Hand» Johansen: 30 Years On the Road (1995)
- Emporio: Punk: Live and Nasty (1995)
- Anagram Records: Cherry Red Records – The Punk Singles Collection (1995)
- Ronco Silver: Seventies Rock (1995)
- Ian Hunter: Dirty Laundry (1995)
- The Splash Four: Funbangers EP (1995)
- Nasty Vinyl: Punk Christmas (1995)
- Dressed to Kill: Agitprop: The Politics of Punk (1996)
- The Kids: Sønner av norske jenter – The Kids Greatest Hits (1996)
- Dressed to Kill: God Save the Queen: 20 Years of Punk (1996)
- Dressed to Kill: Were So Pretty: A Punk Anthology – Part Two (1996)
- The Splash Four: Do the Earthquake Shake! (1997)
- The Circus Sideshow: The Circus Sideshow (1997)
- The Lurkers: God's Lonely Men (1997)
- Music Club: United Kingdom of Punk (1997)
- Rialto: New Wave (1997)
- Cleopatra: 100% Pure Bollocks: The Unacceptable Stench of Bullshit (1997)
- The Boys-hyllest: Satisfaction Guaranteed – A Tribute to The Boys (1997)
- Pojat: Parhaat biisit ja paras mahdollinen show (1997)
- Trøste & Bære: Greitest Hits (1997)
- Receiver Records: A History of Punk (1997)
- Egmont Music Club: Det beste av norsk musikk 1981–1983 (1998)
- The Mighty Four: I'll Never Wound Anything But Hearts (1998)
- Ian Hunter: Bald at the Station (1998)
- Safety Pins: Crazy Man (1998)
- Dressed to Kill: The Shit Factory: The Greatest Punk Swindle of All Time (1998)
- Jeff Dahl: I Was a Teenage Glam-Fag – Volume 1 (1998)
- Thee Michelle Gun Elephant: Out Blues/Soda Pressing (1998)
- Safety Pins: Powergenerator (1998)
- Thee Michelle Gun Elephant: 7inch Vinyl Box (1999)
- Receiver Records: Live at the Roxy, London (1999)
- Universal Music: 1-2-3-4 Punk and New Wave 1976–1979 (1999)
- Dressed to Kill: The Greatest Punk Album of All Time (1999)
- Receiver Records: The Ultimate Punk Box Set (1999)
- Dressed to Kill: I Spit On Your Gravy (1999)
- Loose Lips: Talkin' Trash (1999)
- The Vultures: Alcoholic Lady/Soda Pressing (2000)
- MTG: Æ e trønder æ (2000)
- The Lurkers: The BBC Punk Sessions (2000)
- Ne Luupojat Surf: Henki elää! (2001)
- Dressed to Kill: Silver Jubilee: 25 Years of Punk (1976–2001) (2001)
- Harry May: A Proper Fucking Punk Album: 16 British Real Punk Anthems (2001)
- Dressed to Kill: The Entire History of Punk (2001)
- EMI: Cash from Chaos: The Complete Punk Collection (2001)
- BMG: Punk Lives! (2001)
- Receiver Records: Live from the Roxy, Vol. 2 (2002)
- Universal Music: 96% countryfest (2002)
- Asgeir: På en støvete landevei (2002)
- Asgeir: Turbo compressor noz injection (2002)
- Cherry Red: Punk Covers – Voice of a Generation (2002)
- Safari Records: 25th Anniversary Commemorative Album of Safari Records (2002)
- Holly Tree: The British Punk Classics Greatest Shits (2002)
- Michael Monroe: Whatcha Want (2003)
- The Sirens: Chez Maximes (2003)
- TNT: The Big Bang – The Essential Collection (2003)
- LaserLight Digital: Punk The Greatest Hits – The Best of Punk (2003)
- The Crybabys: What Kind of Rock'n'Roll: The Anthology (2003)
- Rhino Entertainment: No Thanks! The '70s Punk Rebellion (2003)
- RPM Records: Glitterbest – UK Glam With Attitude 1971–1976 (2004)
- Asgeir: Asgeirs beste (2004)
- PK & DanseFolket: I kjempeslag (2004)
- The Sirens: The Sirens (2004)
- Ole Ivars-hyllest: En annen dans (2004)
- Street Dogs Records: Oi! Across the World (2004)
- The Robots: We Are Everywhere (2004)
- Rockaway Records: Todos somos Ramones (2005)
- Claudia Scott: Collection (2005)
- McMusic: More No 1 Hits (2005)
- Ratcats: Promo (2005)
- Membran Music: God Save This Box: Punk Original Masters (2005)
- Liv Marit Wedvik: Dance All Night (2005)
- Unidisc: Norsk musikk i 100 – Vol. 4: Ikke helnorsk, men... (2005)
- Liv Marit Wedvik: Home Sweet Home (2005)
- Ratcats: License to Rumble (2005)
- Ramones-hyllest: Leave Home: A Norwegian Tribute to The Ramones (2005)
- Castle Pulse: Punk Crazy: Anarchy in the UK (2006)
- The Sirens: The Sirens Are Dead (2006)
- Universal Music: Country Jukeboks (2006)
- Backstreet Girls-hyllest: Never Too Loud! A Tribute to Backstreet Girls (2006)
- Artistforbundet: Out of Norway – Selected Songs From Norwegian Artists 2006 (2006)
- Mojo: TRASH!: The Roots of Punk! (2006)
- Castle Pulse: Punk Power! Anarchy In the UK (2006)
- The Carburetors: Loud Enough to Raise the Dead (2006)
- The Kids: Hits fra Kids (2007)
- Backstreet Girls: Shake Your Stimulator (2007)
- Music Brokers: Punk 1977–2007: 30th Anniversary (2007)
- John Payne: Different Worlds (2007)
- EVA Records: Absolute VG-lista 1981 (2007)
- EVA Records: Absolute VG-lista 1982 (2007)
- Castle Music/Sanctuary Records: If the Kids Are United: The Punk Box Set (2008)
- Mojo: Destroy! (2008)
- Cherry Red: Perfect Unpop: Peel Show Hits and Long-Lost Lo-Fi Favourites Vol. 1 – 1976–1980 (2008)
- Diverse: Canciones que nos enseñaron... Shock Treatment (2008)
- Cherry Red: I'll Give You My Heart I'll Give You My Heart – The Cherry Red Records Singles Collection 1978–1983 (2008)
- Ziggy & The Rhythm Bulldogs: Boogie Woogie Knockout (2009)
- Backstreet Girls: Just When You Thought Things Couldn't Get Any Worse... ...Here's the Backstreet Girls (2009)
- Diverse: Cherries Jubileee (2009)
- Vinyl Japan: Vinyl Japan Calling From London: The Official Method of Klub Dancing Vol. 5 (2010)
- Virgin/EMI: 101 Punk & New Wave Anthems (2010)
- Radiations: Radiations (2010)
- Year Zero: Dirty Water: The Birth of Punk Attitude (2010)
- Backstreet Girls: Let the Boogie Do the Talking (2010)
- Die Toten Hosen: Vinyl Box (2010)
- TNT: Engine (2010)
- Trond Granlund: Bror min og jeg (2012)
- Pojat: Klassikot (2013)
- Pojat: Toimintaa & sankareita (2013)
- Liv Marit Wedvik: So the Story Goes – The Very Best of Liv Marit Wedvik (2013)
- Universal: Norsk på engelsk country – 20 norske countryklassikere (2013)
- Petter Baarli: You Petter B. Goode (2014)
- Me First and the Gimme Gimmes: Are We Not Men? We Are Diva! (2014)
- Universal: Norske countryduetter (2014)
- Soul Jazz Records: Punk 45: Sick On You! One Way Spit! After the Love & Before the Revolution – Proto-Punk 1969–76 Vol. 3 (2014)
- Ox Fanzine: Ox-Compilation 114 (2014)
- Wompers: Wompers (2014)
- Ottar «Big Hand» Johansen: 50 Years On the Road (2015)
- Mojo: Pretty Vacant – Mojo Presents 15 Pre-Punk Nuggets (2015)
- Plastic Tears: Rhythm Rider (2016)
- Petter Baarli: Frankly My Dear, I Don't Give a Dawn! (2016)
- Warner Music: Spurts! Punk & Post-Punk From the '70s & Beyond (2016)
- Cherry Red: Action Time Vision – A Story of Independent UK Punk 1976–1979 (2016)
- Benoni & Big Hand: Benoni & Big Hand (2017)
- Stnd. Union: Sing, Drink, & Dance With Stnd. Union (2017)
- Edsel Records: Gary Crowley's Punk and New Wave (2017)
