= Turkish Tram Conductor Blues =

1970 song by The Move

Single by The Move

from the album Looking On
- B-side: "Beautiful Daughter"
- Released: January 1971
- Recorded: May–September 1970
- Studio: Advision & Philips, London
- Genre: Rock; blues
- Length: 4:38 (album); 4:46 (single)
- Label: Ariola (Germany)
- Songwriter: Roy Wood
- Producers: Roy Wood; Jeff Lynne

The Move singles chronology
"When Alice Comes Back to the Farm" (1970)	"Turkish Tram Conductor Blues" (1971)	"Tonight" (1971)

"Turkish Tram Conductor Blues" is a song performed by English band The Move, which was released on their third studio album, Looking On, on 11 December 1970, before later being released as the third and final single from the album. The song was written and produced by Roy Wood (co-producing with Jeff Lynne), though the group's drummer Bev Bevan was credited as songwriter on original copies, as a reward for his promotional efforts on behalf of the band. Bevan noted that the song was "the sort of the thing that the Wild Angels might like to play". "Turkish Tram Conductor Blues" is also noted for rumours of hidden swear words in the track.

== Background and composition ==
"Turkish Tram Conductor Blues" was written for the band's third studio album, Looking On. The song, alongside two of Wood's other songs on the album ("Brontosaurus" and "When Alice Comes Back to the Farm"), show a more "harder" metal genre, compared to the songs of the previous album Shazam, which leaned more into progressive rock. "Turkish Tram Conductor Blues" specifically showcases a blues sound, as hinted at in the title of the song.

== Release ==
The song was originally released on 11 December 1970, as the second track on the band's third studio album, Looking On. The song was then released as the third single to the album in January 1971, with the single version lasting eight seconds longer than the album version. The B-side was a track called "Beautiful Daughter", which was previously released on the band's second studio album, Shazam. The song was originally going to be released as its own single a year prior, but the idea was dropped due to band member Carl Wayne's departure around that same time.

== Track listing ==
7" single release (1971)

1. "Turkish Tram Conductor Blues" – 4:46
2. "Beautiful Daughter" – 2:35

== Personnel ==
The Move

- Roy Wood - lead vocals, guitar, saxophone, banjar
- Jeff Lynne - piano, guitar
- Bev Bevan - drums
- Rick Price - bass

Additional personnel

- Roger Wake - engineering
- Roy Wood - production
- Jeff Lynne - production

== See also ==
- The Move discography
