= The Boys (English band) =

English punk rock band

- Also known as: The Yobs
- Origin: London, England
- Genre: Punk rock
- Years active: 1976–1982; 1999–present
- Labels: NEMS; Safari
- Spinoff of: London SS; Hollywood Brats
- Members: Matt Dangerfield; Casino Steel; Kent Norberg; Martin H-Son; Chips Kiesbye
- Past members: Jack Black; Kid Reid; Vom Ritchie; Honest John Plain
- Website: http://www.theboys.co.uk

The Boys are an English punk rock band formed in London in 1976. Founded by former members of London SS and Hollywood Brats, the band released four studio albums and eight singles, in addition to recording Christmas themed music under the name The Yobs, before disbanding in the summer of 1982. The band reformed in 1999 and released a new album in 2014.

== History ==
The Boys came together when singer/guitarist Matt Dangerfield left the punk band London SS in September 1975 to form a new band with ex-Hollywood Brats keyboard player Casino Steel. Dangerfield’s art college friend, guitarist Honest John Plain, was recruited and in June 1976, two of Plain'’s co-workers at a T-shirt printing company, bassist Duncan "Kid" Reid and drummer Jack Black, completed the line-up. Steel (ex-Hollywood Brats) and Dangerfield played in the London SS together. The band's early recordings were made in a home recording studio which Dangerfield had set up in his rented basement apartment in Maida Vale.

The band played their first concert at the Hope and Anchor pub in Islington, London on 15 October 1976. Among the crowd were Mick Jones, Billy Idol, Tony James and Gene October. After a few concerts, The Boys signed to NEMS in January 1977, and at that time the only British punk band to have a record deal — the Sex Pistols having been sacked by EMI on 6 January 1977 and the Damned having initially signed a one single deal with Stiff Records for "New Rose", which had been released in October 1976.

Their first release was the single "I Don't Care", and in support of that release, they toured with John Cale of Velvet Underground. Their 16-track debut album, The Boys, was recorded in early May 1977, but commercial release was delayed until 9 September 1977. The album reached No. 50 in the UK Albums Chart. A second single, "First Time" — with a theme of losing virginity — was released on 27 July 1977. As a result, John Peel invited The Boys to record a live session for his show, which became 'Single Of The Week' in Sounds magazine. The single was steadily climbing the chart, until August 1977.

The Boys released a second album on NEMS, titled Alternative Chartbusters, and toured in support of it with the Ramones. The Boys then signed with Safari in 1979, and two albums and five singles followed before the band broke up in the summer of 1981. Each Christmas, the group rearranged the "B" and the "Y" in their name and became The Yobs, releasing four singles and one album; 1980s Christmas Album. In this incarnation, the band members used the pseudonyms Noddy Oldfield, Ebenezer Polak, Kid Vicious and H. J. Bedwetter.

On 31 July and 1 August 1999, four out of five original members, along with Steve "Vom" Ritchie (replacing Jack Black on drums, who was busy with his own band) played concerts in Japan. In September 2000, this new lineup played at the 'Holidays in the Sun Festival' in Bilbao, Spain. Original drummer Jack Black made a guest appearance and filmed the concert. It was the first time in 18 years that the five original band members had been reunited on stage. In 2006, the band again performed concerts, including their first shows in London in 25 years. Following their reunion tour in London, one of the Boys' early songs, "Jimmy Brown", was released as a single in December 2008.

In November 2011 Duncan Reid left the band.

In June 2014, The Boys released their first new studio album since 1981, Punk Rock Menopause, on Wolverine Records. The album featured founding members Matt Dangerfield, Casino Steel and Honest John Plain, and included 13 new songs bearing the band’s trademark style.

Nick Medlin, formerly of Manufactured Romance, played bass on the bands 2014 German tour and appears in the "Punk Rock Girl" video.

Kent Norberg of Swedish band Sator joined the band for their planned 2015 tour of China.

The Boys arrived in Shanghai, China, on 13 January 2015 to embark on a nine-date national tour to promote their new album Punk Rock Menopause, but found that the tour had been cancelled by the Chinese Ministry of Culture due to "crowd control and security issues". The ban came in the aftermath of the Shanghai stampede at a New Year celebration in which 36 people were killed a few weeks earlier. The band set off on a cultural tour of China hosted by Shanghai-based punk band Round Eye. Along the way they played three underground gigs promoted by word of mouth, gave a number of interviews, were the subject of a one-hour documentary on top TV channel in Beijing, and recorded a live album, Undercover - Live in China, which was released by Action Records on 1 July 2015.

In 2015 Honest John Plain suffered a serious head injury following a fall. This resulted in multiple hospital stays. At this time producer and Norbergs' Sator bandmate Chips Kiesbye first stood in for Plain on guitar.

In September 2021, the band released an EP called I'm a Believer which also featured "She's the Reason" from Punk Rock Menopause and the unreleased track "(There Ain't No) Just One Beer". In May 2022, the band reached the top 30 of Mike Read's Heritage Chart on Talking Pictures TV with "Weekend", in a chart which also featured the Vapors and the Automatics.

On 12 June 2025, Honest John Plain, died at the age of 73.

== Legacy ==
The Boys achieved limited commercial success, but their music has influenced the development of other bands. German punk band Die Toten Hosen performed cover versions of their music regularly for more than a decade. They also recorded cover versions of some songs, namely "First Time" for their album Auf dem Kreuzzug ins Glück - 125 Jahre die Toten Hosen and "Brickfield Nights" for the cover album Learning English, Lesson One. On the rear of the cover of The Jam's 1978 album All Mod Cons, the photograph of Paul Weller's Rickenbacker 330 guitar carries a The Boys Weller.

In the mid 1990s, Los Angeles based power pop band, Amanda Jones, covered the song, "First Time ". Later that decade, Japanese band Thee Michelle Gun Elephant had a hit with a Boys cover. This prompted the re-release of several Boys albums, and more than 30,000 albums were sold in Japan alone. A Boys tribute album was also released featuring 13 bands from around the world. The Boys also influenced the cult power pop band The Exploding Hearts, who performed and recorded in the early 2000s.

== Band members ==
=== Current ===
- Matt Dangerfield – guitar, vocals (1976– present)
- Casino Steel – organ, piano, vocals (1976–1980 & 1999–present)
- Kent Norberg – bass, vocals (2014–present)
- Martin H-Son – drums (2009–present)
- Chips Kiesbye – guitar, vocals (2015–present)

=== Former ===
- Kid Reid – bass, vocals (1976–1981 & 1999–2011)
- Jack Black – drums (1976–1981)
- Honest John Plain – guitar, vocals (1976–1981 & 1999–2025; his death)
- Vom Ritchie – drums, vocals (1999–2009)

== Discography as The Boys ==
=== Albums ===
- The Boys (1977)
- Alternative Chartbusters (1978)
- To Hell with the Boys (1979)
- Boys Only (1981)
- Punk Rock Menopause (2014)

=== Live albums ===
- Live at Dora's (Swansea) (1978)
- Live at Roxy (1990)
- Powercut (unplugged) (1996)
- Live in Concert (1980 & 1977) (with the Vibrators) (1993)
- Undercover - Live in China (2015)

=== Singles ===
- "I Don't Care" / "Soda Pressing" (1977)
- "First Time" / "Watcha Gonna Do" / "Turning Grey" (1977)
- "Brickfield Nights" / "Teacher's Pet" (1978)
- "Kamikaze" / "Bad Days" (1979)
- "Terminal Love" / "I Love Me" (1980)
- "You Better Move On" / "Schoolgirls" (1980)
- "Weekend" / "Cool" (1980)
- "Let It Rain" / "Lucy" (1980)
- "Svengerland" / "Only a Game" (2002)
- "Jimmy Brown" / "Walk My Dog" (2008)

=== Compilation appearances ===
- Odds and Sods (1990)
- The Boys/Alternative Chartbusters (1993)
- Best of the Boys (1995)
- Complete Punk Singles Collection (1996)
- No Thanks!: The 70s Punk Rebellion (2003)
- Terminal Love (2021)

== Discography as The Yobs ==
=== Albums ===
- The Yobs' Christmas Album (1979)
- The Yobs' Xmas 11 (1991)
- The Yobs' Leads 3 Amps Utd 0 (1995)
- The Yobs' The Worst of the Yobs (2001)

=== Singles ===
- "Run Rudolph Run" / "The Worm Song" (1977)
- "Silent Night" / "Stille Nacht" (1978)
- "Rub-A-Dum-Dum" / "Another Christmas" (1979)
- "Yobs on 45" / "The Ballad of the Warrington" (1981)
