= Split Ends =

Split ends may refer to:

- Split ends, the splitting or fraying of hair, also known as trichoptilosis
- Split end, a type of wide receiver in American and Canadian football

== TV and film ==
- Split Ends (British TV series), a sitcom produced on ITV
- Split Ends (American TV series), a reality show on Style Network
- Split Ends (2009), a comedy film directed by Dorothy Lyman

== Music ==
- Split Enz, a New Zealand band originally called Split Ends
  - "Split Ends", a 1973 song by Split Enz found on their compilation album The Beginning of the Enz
- Split Ends (album), an album by The Move
