= Gary Holton =

British singer-songwriter, musician and actor (1952–1985)

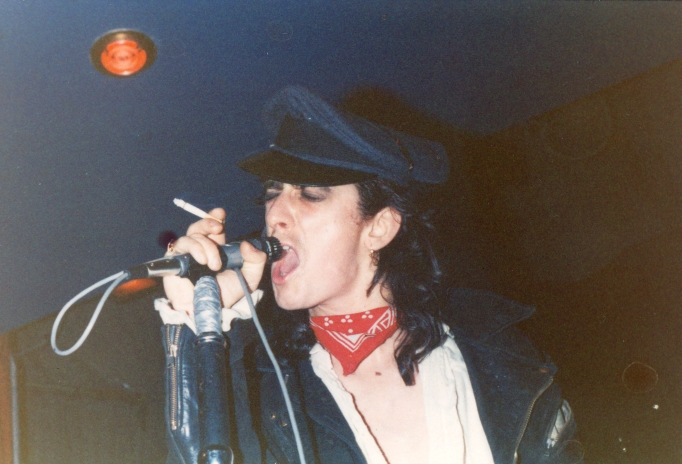
- Holton in 1974
- Born: Gary Frederick Holton; 22 September 1952; Clapham, London, England
- Died: 25 October 1985 (aged 33); London, England
- Resting place: Maesgwastad Cemetery, Welshpool, Wales
- Occupations: Musician; actor
- Years active: 1971–1985
- Spouse: Donna Campbell (m. 1979)
- Children: 1
- Musical career
- Genres: Glam rock; hard rock; folk rock
- Instruments: Vocals; guitar; keyboards; harmonica
- Labels: Safari; Receiver; Magnet
- Formerly of: The Koobas/Gary & Stu, Heavy Metal Kids, The Actors, Casino Steel, Mick Rossi

Gary Frederick Holton (22 September 1952 – 25 October 1985) was an English singer-songwriter, musician and actor. He was the frontman of the band Heavy Metal Kids (1972–1977), worked with Casino Steel (1981–1984), and played the part of Wayne Norris (a.k.a. 'London') in the UK television comedy Auf Wiedersehen, Pet (1983–1985). Holton died from an overdose of morphine combined with alcohol in 1985.

== Early life ==
Gary Holton was born in Clapham, south west London, the first child of Ernie and Joan Holton, and grew up in Kennington. Whilst musically talented, and a member of a rock band as a schoolboy at Beaufoy School, Lambeth, his real ambition was to act.

Early in his life, Holton began working in the theatre world with the Sadler's Wells Opera Company, debuting in opera appearances aged eleven, and was with them for three years. In 1966 he had a part in Congreve's Love for Love with Laurence Olivier, and at fourteen played the title role in Menotti's Amahl and the Night Visitors.

== Acting career ==
=== Early roles ===
Holton sang the theme tune to 1980s British children's drama, Murphy's Mob, which was produced by Central Television.

=== Auf Wiedersehen, Pet ===
In the hit television comedy drama Auf Wiedersehen, Pet Holton played Wayne Norris, a carpenter from London. The character was fond of women, music and alcoholic drinks, as Holton was off-screen. Following his death, the release of the shows second season was delayed.

== Musical career ==
=== Heavy Metal Kids ===
Gary was the front-man for the band, which formed in 1972. With his cockney accent, he became a popular glam rock singer. The band were discovered by former Dave Dee, Dozy, Beaky, Mick & Tich front-man Dave Dee, who signed them to Atlantic Records. Their eponymous debut album was well received by the press, but had achieved limited sales. They later played many gigs with punk rock band The Adverts. On their first American tour in 1975, they shortened their name to "The Kids".

In December 1975, the group signed with producer Mickie Most's RAK label but before work could begin on their next album, Holton was sacked amid a storm of drink- and drug-related headlines. Plans for the remaining members to continue on without him came to nothing. In late 1977, Holton rejoined the band for a handful of live shows and the long-delayed third album, Kitsch. However, by mid-1978, he had departed once again and the band broke up.

Whilst the band was popular in Sweden, they had little commercial success in Britain although in 1976 their single "She's No Angel" was regularly played on BBC Radio 1, a favourite of DJ John Peel, and this led to an appearance on Top of the Pops in May 1976. Holton subsequently left the band.

=== Solo, Casino Steel and The Gang Show ===
In December 1978, Holton stood in for The Damned vocalist Dave Vanian on a short Scottish tour; he auditioned to replace the late Bon Scott in AC/DC. At this time met Casino Steel, a musician from Norway. Both were extensive drug users, and left London for Trondheim, Norway to escape and began to record music. In the early 1980s, the band released a couple of albums which sold well in Norway. The duo's musical style was country rock with strong punk influences, their first hit being a cover of Kenny Rogers' "Ruby". Gary Holton's Norwegian musical career went largely unnoticed in his homeland.

In 1984/1985, just before his death, Holton was in a band called The Gang Show, with Glen Matlock and James Stevenson and keyboard player James Hallawell. They recorded one set of demos. In 2020, the song, Big Tears, surfaced on a James Stevenson Anthology collection "40 Years In The Rock 'n' Roll Wilderness".

== Personal life ==
Holton's father was a publican, the family moving to Welshpool in the 1960s. Holton would periodically work and live in his fathers pubs during the 1980s. He was know to be close friends with Mick Jagger of The Rolling Stones. In June 1985, Holton was fined and banned from driving following a hearing at Clerkenwell Court where he was charged with driving under the influence of alcohol, driving without a license and insurance.

=== Relationships ===
In 1977, Holton dated singer Stella Palmer, with whom he performed his cover version of "Somethin' Stupid" in 1973. Holton and Palmer got engaged in March 1977, but in May the same year, Palmer called off the engagement, stating their relationship was not going quite as planned.

From 1979 Holton was married to model Donna Campbell. They were amicably separated from 1981 and remained friends, though they were still not divorced at the time of his death. Holton later had a relationship with model Susan Harrison who gave birth to his son, Red in 1983.

At the time of his death, Holton had separated from Harrison and was in a relationship with Jahnet McIllwain, who would ultimately be the one to discover Holton had died.

=== Death ===
Holton spent the night of 24 October at friend Paul Witta's home in Wembley, London. Holton was found dead by his fiancée Jahnet McIllwain in bed in the early hours of the morning on 25 October 1985. He had died from an overdose of alcohol and morphine, with traces of diazepam and cannabis in his system. Pathologist Rufus Crompton said during his inquest at Hornsey, North London, that he would have been drinking less than half an hour before his death, and that the morphine would have made him unconscious within a matter of minutes.

Holton had a blood alcohol level of 199 mg and a morphine level of 0.8 mg per litre (0.5 mg per litre is considered invariably fatal). He had been a drug user for several years after experiences through the music scene and was addicted to heroin, a habit he had quit some time after the first series of Auf Wiedersehen, Pet had been broadcast. He was considering setting up a clinic to help others with their addictions.

Holton had considerable debts and had two bankruptcy orders totalling £61,000 over him. These debts were partly due to his not having paid tax since 1979, and also having a mortgage of £48,500 on his flat in Maida Vale, West London.

He died before the second series of Auf Wiedersehen, Pet had completed filming, but the producers used body doubles and editing of dialogue already recorded to allow the series to be completed. They eventually rescripted the series, such that in every indoor scene that originally included Holton, excuses were made for his absence.

He also had released the single "Catch a Falling Star" in early 1984. He had been due to star in the pantomime Peter Pan that upcoming Christmas. He was survived by his son, Red, with model Susan Harrison.

=== Funeral ===
Holton's funeral took place on 22 November 1985, with a 15-minute service at Golders Green Crematorium in London. Jimmy Nail, Tim Healy, Timothy Spall, Kevin Whately, Pat Roach and Christopher Fairbank with whom he starred in Auf Wiedersehen, Pet all attended. His ashes were placed on his grandparents' grave in Maesgwastad Cemetery, Welshpool.

== Discography ==
=== Albums ===
With Heavy Metal Kids

- Heavy Metal Kids (1974) Atlantic Records
- Anvil Chorus (1975) Atlantic Records
- Kitsch (1977) Rak Records
- Live And Loud!! (1988) Link Records

With Casino Steel

- Gary Holton & Casino Steel (1981) Polydor Records
- Part II (1982) Polydor Records
- III Edition (1983) Polydor Records
- No 4 (1984) Polydor Records
- Best of Gary Holton and Casino Steel (1984) Home's Musikk
- We Did It Our Way (1986) Grappa
- The Best (1989) Amulet
- Ruby – The Very Best of Gary Holton & Casino Steel (1995) Norske Gram AS
- Anthology (2010) Polydor
- The Ballad of Gary Holton & Casino Steel (2019) Big Dipper Records
- The Ballad of Gary Holton & Casino Steel Vol. 2 (2019) Big Dipper Records

Solo

- Gary Holton (1986) Gaza Records

=== With Mick Rossi ===
- Sing It To Me (1989) Receiver Records Limited (Released Posthumously; Featuring Slaughter And The Dogs guitarist Mick Rossi)

=== Singles ===
With Heavy Metal Kids

- "It's The Same" (1974) Atlantic Records
- "Ain't Nothing But A House Party/You Got Me Rollin'" (1975) Atlantic Records
- "Ain't Nothing But A House Party/You Got Me Rollin' Re-Mix" (1975) Atlantic Records
- "She's No Angel" (1976) Rak Records
- "Delirious" (1977) Rak Records/EMI Electrola
- "Chelsea Kids" (1977) Rak Records/EMI Electrola

With Casino Steel

- "Ruby, Don't Take Your Love to Town" / "Good Ol' Gary" (1981) Polydor Records
- "Blackberry Way" / "Candy" (1982) Polydor Records
- "No Reply" / "What Looks Best on You" (1982) Polydor Records
- "Thinking Of You" / "Good Ol' Gary" (1982) Killroy
- "She's Got Balls" / "On the Rig" (1982) Polydor Records
- "Baby I Love You" / "I Wish I Was An Angel" (1984) Sonet
- "People In Love" / "Pick Me Up" (1986) Grappa
- "Runaway" / "She's No Angel" (1989) Amulet Records (Released Posthumously)

Solo

- "Ruby, Don't Take Your Love to Town" (1980) Safari Records
- "Catch A Falling Star" / "Angel" (1984) Magnet Records
- "Holiday Romance" / "No Communication" (1984) Magnet Records (Featuring Mick Rossi)
- "Catch A Falling Star Re-Issue" (1989) Not on Label (Released Posthumously)

== Filmography ==
Year	Title	Role	Notes
1979	Quadrophenia	Aggressive Rocker	Uncredited
1979	Shoestring	Gary Molecombe	1 episode
1979	The Knowledge	Eddie Hairstyle	
1980	Play for Today	Keith	1 episode
1980	Bloody Kids	Ken	1 episode
1980	Breaking Glass	Punk Guitarist	
1981	Tiny Revolutions	Neighbour	TV movie
1981	The Gentle Touch	Rick Sloan	1 episode
1983–85	Auf Wiedersehen, Pet	Wayne Norris	26 episodes, (final appearance)
1984	Minder	Barry	Series 5, Episode 3: A Number of Old Wives Tales
1985	Bulman	Bernie Scroop	1 episode
