= Alternative Chartbusters =

Alternative Chartbusters may refer to:

- Alternative Chartbusters (Stiff Little Fingers album), 1991
- Alternative Chartbusters (The Boys album), 1978
