= Manufactured Romance =

- Origin: London, England
- Genres: Punk rock
- Years active: 1979–1982, 2008
- Labels: Fresh, Jungle Records
- Past members: Nick Medlin; Benny Di Massa; Bob Moore; Mark Chapman; Nina Spencer

Manufactured Romance was a pop punk band from London, England, who were active from 1979 until 1982. They briefly reformed in late 2008 - playing a short series of live concerts, and self-releasing an incomplete CD retrospective at the same time.

== History ==
In 1978 the band formed under the name 4th Reich, and made their live debut at The Marquee in January 1979. Within weeks they renamed themselves Lost Property, and supported the U.K. Subs on the Stranglehold tour. They appeared in the UK Subs film Punk Can Take It, and recorded with guitarist Nicky Garrett. The band lineup was Nick Medlin (bass), Benny Di Massa (drums), Mark Chapman (guitar) and Nina Spencer (vocals).

In 1980 they become a five-piece with Canadian Bob Moore on lead guitar, and changed their name to Manufactured Romance. After some touring the band signed to Fresh Records, and released a well-received single "Time of My Life"/"Room To Breathe". "Time of My Life" was included in the label compilation Fresh Collection, and Manufactured Romance headlined the Fresh Festival at the London's Music Machine. Two more songs, "You" and "Long Distance Love", were included in a punk compilation Backstage Pass released by Supermusic - a PA hire company - and widely licensed internationally.

In 1981 the relationship with Fresh soured, and the band moved on to work with Doll by Doll's management and record with producer Tom Newman but nothing further was released. In 1982 Nina had health problems and Moore and Di Massa left. In 1983 Paul Cokayne was recruited on drums and the band briefly continued as a four-piece under the name Foreign Flags.

The band did a number of reunion shows in August 2008 and self-released an untitled CD, comprising both released and unreleased material (but omitting "Room To Breathe", the b-side of their sole 7" release). CD track list: "Chameleon", "Deja Vu", "You", "Time Of My Life". "Easy", "Long Distant Love", "Twist The Day", "When You Said", "Criminal Mind".

== Discography ==
=== Single ===
- Time Of My Life (3:17) / Room To Breathe (2:48) (Fresh Records FRESH 016, 1980)

=== Album ===
- Untitled CD (self-released, 2008[?])

=== Compilation appearances ===
- Fresh Records - The Punk Singles Collection (Fresh, 1982; Jungle, 1994) - "Time Of My Life"
- Punk Archives - 25 Punk Singles (Jungle, 2000) - "Time Of My Life"
- It's Punk, Innit? (Jungle FREUDCD 777) - "Time Of My Life"
- Back Stage Pass (Supermusic Co. 1980) - "Long distance love", "You"
