= Split Ends (album) =

1972 album by The Move

Compilation album by the Move
- Released: December 1972
- Genres: Power pop; psychedelic rock
- Length: 50:42
- Label: United Artists
- Producers: Roy Wood; Jeff Lynne

The Move chronology
Message from the Country (1971)	Split Ends (1972)

Split Ends is a compilation album by English rock band The Move, released in December of 1972. It was the group's first release under the United Artists label. It was only released in the United States and Canada.

Split Ends mostly consists of songs from the band's previous album, Message from the Country, but also features several singles made by the band around that time, such as "Chinatown", "California Man", and the hit "Do Ya".

== Reception ==
Professional ratings
Review scores
Source	Rating
Allmusic	4.5/5 stars
Christgau's Record Guide	A−

On release the album was regarded by some critics as a posthumous 'best-of'. Dink Lorance, writing in March 1973, described it as 'a collection of 12 of the band's finest tunes', adding that 'Roy Wood, Bev Bevan and Jeff Lynne have since moved in other directions but their memories hold up well when this album's around.'

According to Richie Unterberger, Split Ends is an improved version of Message from the Country, with many of the weak songs being replaced by some of the band's singles. Robert Christgau has suggested that the single "Do Ya", included on this album, was rated as "single of the year" by the rock press.

== Track listing ==
Side one
No.	Title	Writer(s)	Lead vocals	Length
1.	"Do Ya"	Jeff Lynne	Roy Wood, Jeff Lynne	4:03
2.	"Message from the Country"	Lynne	Jeff Lynne	4:50
3.	"Chinatown"	Roy Wood	Roy Wood, Jeff Lynne	3:06
4.	"The Minister"	Lynne	Jeff Lynne	4:33
5.	"The Words of Aaron"	Lynne	Jeff Lynne	5:31
6.	"Down on the Bay"	Lynne	Jeff Lynne	4:14

Side two
No.	Title	Writer(s)	Lead vocals	Length
7.	"California Man"	Wood	Roy Wood, Jeff Lynne	3:35
8.	"No Time"	Lynne	Jeff Lynne	3:44
9.	"Ella James"	Wood	Roy Wood	3:16
10.	"It Wasn't My Idea To Dance"	Wood	Roy Wood	5:29
11.	"Until Your Mama's Gone"	Wood	Roy Wood	5:04
12.	"Tonight"	Wood	Roy Wood, Jeff Lynne	3:17

== Personnel ==
- Roy Wood – oboes, guitars, recorders, steel guitar, bass, clarinet, bassoon, saxophone, vocals
- Jeff Lynne – guitars, vocals, piano, electric piano, percussion
- Bev Bevan – drums, percussion, vocals
