= Message from the Country =

Studio album by the Move
- Released: June 1971
- Recorded: June 1970 – May 1971
- Studio: Olympic and Philips, London
- Genre: Hard rock; power pop; psychedelic pop; rock and roll
- Length: 38:28
- Label: Harvest (UK); Capitol (US)
- Producer: Roy Wood; Jeff Lynne

The Move chronology
Looking On (1970)	Message from the Country (1971)	Split Ends (1972)

US album cover

Message from the Country is the fourth and final studio album by the Move, as well as the group's only album for EMI's Harvest label, where the album was released in the United Kingdom. The album was also released on Capitol Records in the United States. It was recorded simultaneously with the first Electric Light Orchestra album, The Electric Light Orchestra (or No Answer as it was called in the United States). Recorded due to a contractual obligation with EMI for one more Move album, its release signaled the end of The Move (with the exception of three final singles), allowing the band to transition into the Electric Light Orchestra.

The album was produced by Move members Roy Wood and Jeff Lynne, and recorded at various times between June 1970 and May 1971 in Olympic Studios and Phillips Studios, both based in London. It would later be released in June 1971. Although no singles were released from the project, "My Marge" was re-released as the B-side to the non-album single "Tonight" in the United States, and "Ella James" was released as the B-side to another non-album single, "California Man". In 2005, the album was reissued with 9 bonus tracks, including "Tonight" and "California Man", alongside two other non-album singles, "Chinatown" and "Do Ya".

== Background and recording ==
By the time of Message from the Country, the band members had long since lost interest in the Move and had already formed a new band, Electric Light Orchestra (ELO). Recorded in 1970–71 at the same time that the three members of the Move were also laying down tracks for the first Electric Light Orchestra album, The Electric Light Orchestra (even during some of the same sessions), it inevitably has some similarities in style to the new band's debut album, especially the heavy use of "tracking up" (overdubbing) to capture all of the instruments being played by Roy Wood and Jeff Lynne. Nevertheless, Wood and Lynne were determined to maintain some differentiation between the sound of their two groups (for example, by confining Wood's saxophones to Message and his cellos to the ELO debut respectively).

One of the early songs recorded during the sessions was "10538 Overture," a Lynne composition that was originally intended to be a Move B-side. Wood overdubbed a cello riff over the basic track 15 times over, and he and Lynne decided, after still more overdubs, that the song was better suited to The Electric Light Orchestra. The song "Do Ya," recorded in these sessions and released by The Move as the B-side to "California Man," also later became a hit single for ELO from their 1976 album A New World Record.

The lengthy sessions for this album mostly involved only Wood and Lynne, because of all the overdubbing. During these sessions, bassist Rick Price left The Move in December 1970 (although it was always unclear whether he quit due to his lack of income without touring or was sacked due to the band's lack of income without touring), reducing the Move to a trio. Instead of replacing him, Roy Wood added bass duties to his other roles, as well as erasing Price's tracks on the existing songs and then re-recording the bass parts, but exactly why Wood re-tracked Price's parts is unclear. (Wood has confirmed that Price also played on the original take of "10538 Overture".) Drummer Bev Bevan, in the liner notes for the 2005 reissue of Message from the Country, is quoted as saying that it is his least favorite Move album, while Wood has said "It was probably the best one we ever did."

All previous Move singles had been solo Wood compositions, and recent singles had also featured Wood singing lead. For this album, Wood is credited to composing only four songs, with four songs from Lynne, one Lynne–Wood joint credit, and one Bevan song. Lead vocals on the album were ostensibly split between Wood and Lynne depending upon author (with one Bevan lead vocal), but according to Wood, many of The Move's songs were written collaboratively by himself and Lynne and credited to only one of them for publishing reasons.

== Release and reception ==
Professional ratings
Review scores
Source	Rating
AllMusic	4/5 stars
Billboard	(positive)
Christgau's Record Guide	A−

The initial 1971 album on the Harvest label in the UK and Capitol in the US contained the same 10 tracks, but in different playing order and with a different cover, as did a later reissue on CD on Beat Goes On Records in the UK and One Way in the US. The bonus tracks on the 2005 reissue are alternative takes and A-sides or B-sides of singles. The US rights to the songs were transferred to United Artists shortly after the release of Message from the Country, and various compilation albums and CDs containing some combination of the album songs and five single tracks were released in the US by United Artists for years prior to the comprehensive reissue. One such album is Split Ends (1972); another is the album Great Move: The Best of The Move, released in 1995, by which time Capitol/EMI owned the rights to United Artists material in the US. The latter album, released only on CD contained a US radio ad for "Split Ends" as an unlisted track.

Wood's "Ella James" was released as a single in 1971, but it was quickly withdrawn when Harvest and the group felt that Wood's "Tonight" (not originally on Message) would be a more commercial choice for The Move's first single on the Harvest label. No other song from the album was ever issued as a single, although The Move released two more hit singles ("Chinatown" and "California Man", both written by Wood) before folding into ELO permanently. All three songs featured lead vocals from both Wood and Lynne. The cover painting was done by Wood, based on an idea by Lynne.

"Ella James" was later covered by The Nashville Teens, who released it as a single, although it did not chart. "No Time" was covered by Marshall Crenshaw in 2012 for his EP I Don't See You Laughing Now, which was later included in the 2015 compilation album #392: The EP Collection.

In 2010, Rhapsody called it one of the best "longhaired" power pop albums of the 1970s.

== Track listing ==
Side one
No.	Title	Writer(s)	Lead vocals	Length
1.	"Message from the Country"	Jeff Lynne	Jeff Lynne	4:45
2.	"Ella James"	Roy Wood	Roy Wood	3:11
3.	"No Time"	Lynne	Jeff Lynne	3:38
4.	"Don't Mess Me Up"	Bev Bevan	Roy Wood	3:07
5.	"Until Your Mama's Gone"	Wood	Roy Wood	5:03

Side two
No.	Title	Writer(s)	Lead vocals	Length
6.	"It Wasn't My Idea to Dance"	Wood	Roy Wood	5:28
7.	"The Minister"	Lynne	Jeff Lynne	4:27
8.	"Ben Crawley Steel Company"	Wood	Bev Bevan	3:02
9.	"The Words of Aaron"	Lynne	Jeff Lynne	5:25
10.	"My Marge"	Lynne, Wood	Jeff Lynne	1:59

Bonus tracks (2005 reissue)
No.	Title	Writer(s)	Lead vocals	Length
11.	"Tonight"	Wood	Roy Wood, Jeff Lynne	3:15
12.	"Chinatown"	Wood	Roy Wood, Jeff Lynne	3:06
13.	"Down on the Bay"	Lynne	Jeff Lynne	4:14
14.	"Do Ya"	Lynne	Jeff Lynne, Roy Wood	4:03
15.	"California Man"	Wood	Jeff Lynne, Roy Wood	3:35
16.	"Don't Mess Me Up" (Alternate session version)	Bevan	Roy Wood	3:18
17.	"The Words of Aaron" (Alternate session version)	Lynne	Jeff Lynne	6:03
18.	"Do Ya" (Alternate session version)	Lynne	Jeff Lynne, Roy Wood	4:42
19.	"My Marge" (Alternate session version; "hidden track")	Lynne, Wood	Jeff Lynne	2:18

== Personnel ==
- Roy Wood – lead and backing vocals, guitars, steel guitar, recorders, bass guitar, oboe, clarinet, bassoon, saxophones, percussion
- Jeff Lynne – lead and backing vocals, guitars, piano, percussion, Wurlitzer electric piano, tack piano, Moog, drums (10)
- Bev Bevan – drums, percussion, backing vocals, lead vocals (8)
- Bill Hunt – animal noises (1)
