= Punk Rock Menopause =

Studio album by The Boys
- Released: 20 June 2014
- Genre: Punk
- Label: Wolverine
- Producer: Johnny Cat, Matt Dangerfield, Casino Steel, Honest John Plain

The Boys chronology
Boys Only (1981)	Punk Rock Menopause (2014)

Punk Rock Menopause is the fifth studio album by UK band The Boys, released in 2014.

On release, it was the first studio album from the band since 1981. It features Matt Dangerfield, Casino Steel and Honest John Plain. The album received positive reviews.

The Boys went on tour to support the album, including a nine-date tour of China. However, after the band arrived in China, authorities canceled their tour. This was in reaction to a crowd stampede at a New Years celebration in Shanghai that killed 36 people. However, the Boys put on three secret performances in China.

== Track listing ==
All tracks composed by Casino Steel, Matt Dangerfield and Honest John Plain; except where indicated.

1. "1976" Lead vocal Matt Dangerfield
2. "I Need You" Lead vocal Matt Dangerfield
3. "I'm a Believer" Lead vocal Matt Dangerfield
4. "She's The Reason" Lead vocal Honest John Plain
5. "Global Warming" Lead vocal Matt Dangerfield
6. "Keep Quiet" Lead vocal Matt Dangerfield
7. "How Hot You Are" Lead vocal Matt Dangerfield
8. "Punk Rock Girl" Lead vocal Honest John Plain
9. "Organ Grinder" Lead vocal Matt Dangerfield
10. "How Can I Miss You" Lead vocal Honest John Plain
11. "What's The Matter With Morris" Lead vocal Matt Dangerfield
12. "Pistol Whipping Momma" Lead vocal Honest John Plain
13. "Baby Bye Bye" (Steel, Dangerfield) Lead vocal Matt Dangerfield

== Personnel ==
- Matt Dangerfield - guitar, vocals
- Honest John Plain - guitar, vocals
- Casino Steel - keyboards, vocals
