= California Man (song) =

1972 song by Roy Wood

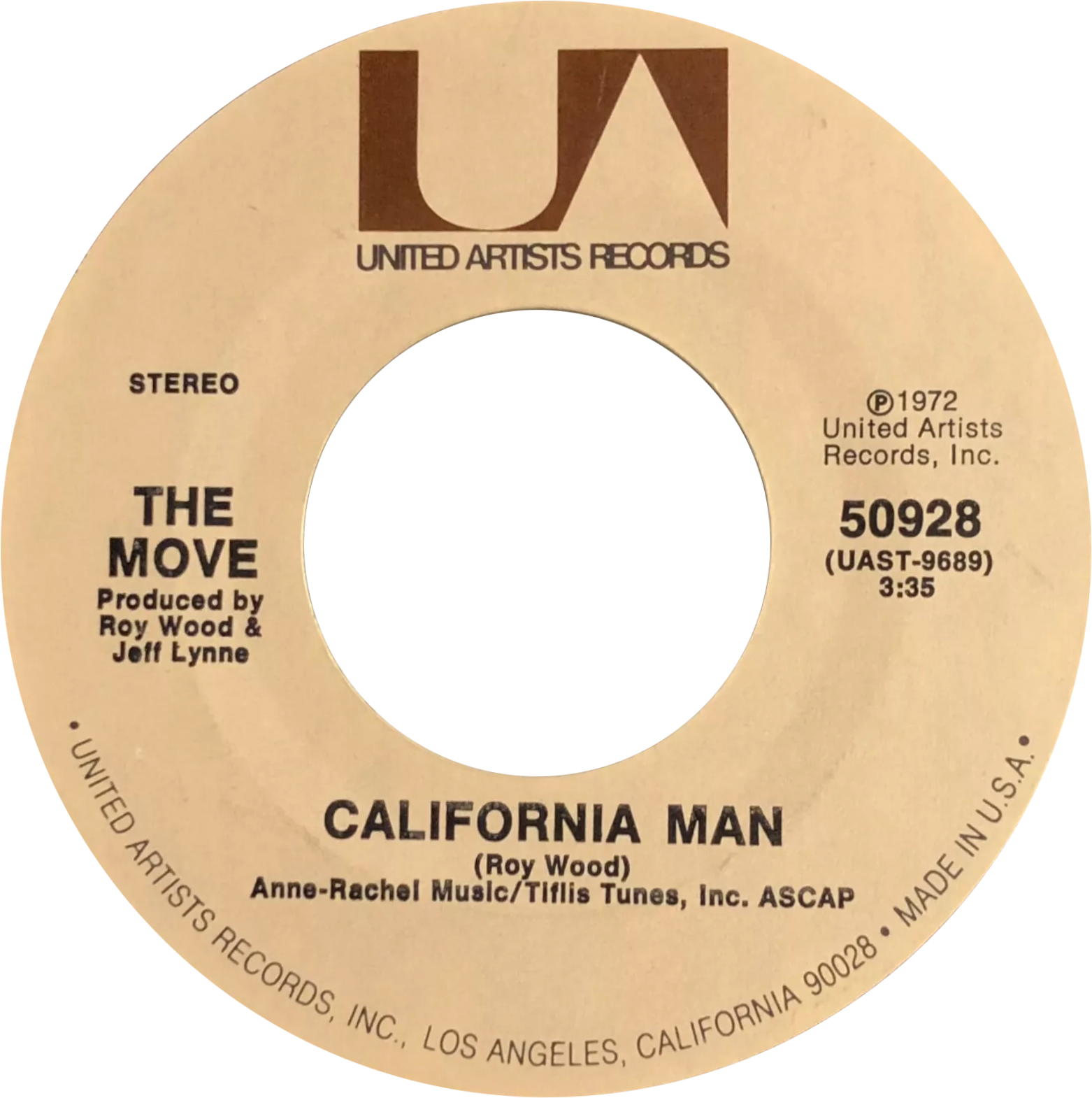
- US single of the Move recording

Single by The Move
- B-side: "Do Ya", "Ella James"
- Released: April 1972
- Recorded: 1971
- Studio: Philips (London)
- Genre: Rock and roll
- Length: 3:37
- Label: Harvest (UK); United Artists (US)
- Songwriter: Roy Wood
- Producers: Roy Wood, Jeff Lynne

The Move singles chronology
"Chinatown" (1971)	"California Man" (1972)	"Do Ya" (1972)

Official audio
- "California Man" on YouTube

"California Man" is a song by British rock and roll band the Move. It was written by the band's guitarist/vocalist Roy Wood, who has said he wrote it as a pastiche of Little Richard (Wood's favourite musician of the time) and Jerry Lee Lewis (fellow Move member Jeff Lynne's favourite musician at the time). The song was also produced by him, alongside Jeff Lynne, and recorded in 1971 at Philips Studios, based in London. The song became the band's final charting single in the United Kingdom, charting at number 7, and was covered by acts such as Cheap Trick and Cliff Richard.

== Release ==
Though the band's popularity would continue to be milked with bootleg singles throughout the 1970s, this was the Move's last officially released single. It was released in April 1972, bearing "Do Ya" and "Ella James" as a double B-side. A pastiche of Jerry Lee Lewis, Little Richard and Larry Williams, the composition is recorded in a high-energy rock and roll style, with lead vocals by both Wood and Jeff Lynne, who were at the time jointly leaders of both the Electric Light Orchestra (ELO) and the Move. "California Man" reached number 7 on the UK Singles Chart in May 1972. Reviewing the single, Record World said "Without a doubt, this is the finest all-around rock & roll record of the year." The ELO issued its first single, "10538 Overture", a month after this track.

In the U.S., "California Man" was issued on the United Artists record label. It was flipped after release, when Lynne's "Do Ya" B-side proved more popular. It became the Move's only U.S. charting single, peaking at number 93 on the Billboard Hot 100 in November 1972. Only Wood, Lynne and drummer Bev Bevan appear on the recording. The picture sleeve has an older picture of the Move, including bassist Rick Price, who was no longer a member of the group by then. None of the Move's albums included the song in their original release; however, it does appear as a bonus track on the 1998 reissue of Message from the Country.

A live vocal performance of the song survives from a 22 June 1972 repeat episode of the BBC's Top of the Pops. This was not the only televised live performance of the track. In 1977 Wood appeared on BBC Sight and Sound in Concert performing it as leader of the Wizzo Band and in 1983, on the Channel 4 GasTank, reprising it with Rick Wakeman and his band. It became a regular opening song when Wood fronted the Roy Wood Big Band on stage at various concerts from 1992 onwards.

== "Ella James" ==
"Ella James"

Song by The Move

from the album Message from the Country
- A-side: "California Man"
- Released: April 1971
- Recorded: June 1970 – May 1971
- Length: 3:11
- Label: Harvest Records; United Artists
- Songwriter: Roy Wood
- Producers: Roy Wood; Jeff Lynne

"Ella James" was a song written by Roy Wood and produced by him and Jeff Lynne, taken from the band's final album Message from the Country. It was first released as a single in the UK in 1971, with "No Time" from the same album on the B-side, but was quickly withdrawn in favour of "Tonight". When it was again released as a single in 1972, it was the B-side of "California Man" along with "Do Ya". The song was released on the album itself, in June 1971, where it was the second track off of the album. Wood has cited "Ella James" as one of his favorite songs to emerge from the collaboration between him and Jeff Lynne, along with Lynne's composition "The Minister".

The song was covered by The Nashville Teens the same year the original version was released. They released their version as a single, backed with the song "Tennessee Woman", which was previously released as a single (backed with a cover of "Train Kept A-Rollin'") in 1970, when the band called themselves "Arizona Swamp Company". The "Ella James" single did not chart, and the group would not release a single for two years, with their planned single "You Shouldn't Have Been So Nice" (planned for 1972) being cancelled.

== Cover versions ==
=== Cheap Trick version ===
"California Man"

Single by Cheap Trick

from the album Heaven Tonight
- B-side: "I Want You to Want Me" (Live)
- Released: December 1978
- Length: 3:44
- Label: Epic Records
- Songwriter: Roy Wood
- Producer: Tom Werman

Cheap Trick singles chronology singles chronology
"Surrender / "Auf Wiedersehen" (1978)	"California Man" (1978)	"I Want You to Want Me (Live) / "Clock Strikes Ten" (1979)

"California Man" was later covered by Cheap Trick, who included it on their 1978 album Heaven Tonight and also released it as a single that year to follow up "Surrender". It failed to chart in the US and UK, but did reach number 76 on the UK Record Business Airplay Guide chart in August 1978. The Cheap Trick version incorporated an instrumental break based on the riff from another Move song, "Brontosaurus". Cash Box praised its "pounding rock 'n' roll beat and excellent guitar work by Rick Nielsen." Roy Wood, who has sometimes joined Cheap Trick on stage, has said how much he likes their rendition of the song. It is a regular feature in Cheap Trick's concert setlists, and has been included on several of the band's compilation albums.

=== Other versions ===
Cliff Richard has performed it live on occasion, as has Italian glam rock band Giuda. Drake Bell covered the song on the 2014 album Ready, Steady, Go!. Comedian Jim Davidson covered it on his 1985 LP The Jim Davidson Album. Ryan Roxie has covered the song as well on the 2018 album Imagine Your Reality with Cheap Trick singer Robin Zander adding a guest vocal appearance.
