= Hollywood Brats =

British glam rock and protopunk band (1971–1975)

- Also known as: The Queen
- Origin: London, England
- Genres: Glam punk; glam rock; proto-punk
- Years active: 1971–1975
- Labels: NEMS; Mercury; Cherry Red
- Past members: Andrew Matheson; Casino Steel (Stein Groven); Lou Sparks; Eunan Brady; Wayne Manor

The Hollywood Brats were a British glam rock and protopunk band in the early 1970s. They found little commercial success at the time, and split up in 1974, but are regarded as influential on the later punk rock scene.

== History ==
The band was originally known as The Queen, and was formed in London in 1971 by singer Andrew Matheson, keyboard player Casino Steel (born Stein Groven in Trondheim, Norway, 22 February 1952), and drummer Lou Sparks. When another rock band, Queen, started to become popular, they were obliged to adopt a new name, Hollywood Brats. In 1972, the group added guitarist Eunan Brady – recruited through an advertisement in Melody Maker for a guitarist "drunk on scotch and Keith Richards" – and bassist Wayne Manor. The band became noted in London for their flamboyant make-up and clothes, and aggressive musical approach, influenced by, and in many ways parallel to, the New York Dolls. Brady later commented that "The whole point of the Brats was to annoy and disturb!" Matheson said:

The Brats were always being booed offstage - sometimes even beaten up by all these people who only ever wanted to hear Barry White or Billy Paul. They never wanted fast rock 'n' roll music...We went round every record company, even the small ones and all they kept saying was that rock 'n' roll music was dead and that that kind of raunchy music would never come back.

The group was championed by Keith Moon, who said they were the best band he had ever seen, and in 1973 they recorded an LP for NEMS Records, described at Allmusic as "pure rock fun with fuzzy, garage-flavored guitar solos, cowbell accents, and snotty lyrics populated with gold diggers and tramps." All the songs were written by Matheson and Steel, apart from a cover of "Then He Kissed Me". However, the record company refused to release the album, and by the time it was eventually issued in Norway by Mercury Records, titled Grown Up Wrong, in 1975, the band had split up. "Then He Kissed Me" was belatedly released as a single by Cherry Red Records in 1979, and the album was reissued as Hollywood Brats the following year.

== Aftermath ==
After the Hollywood Brats, Brady performed with Wreckless Eric. Steel briefly joined London SS before becoming a member of The Boys.

Matheson released a solo album, Monterey Shoes, in 1979. He later moved to Canada, where he released the album Night of the Bastard Moon, recorded in Oslo, Norway, in 1994, and garnered a Juno Award nomination for Best New Solo Artist at the Juno Awards of 1995. In 2015, he published a memoir of the band, Sick On You: The Disastrous Story of Britain’s Great Lost Punk Band, named after one of the Hollywood Brats' songs.

Drummer Lou Sparks passed away on January 3rd, 2023. Matheson died from leukemia on 31 May 2025, aged 73. Steel and Brady continue to perform as of 2026.
