= London SS =

British Rock and Roll band

- Genres: Proto punk
- Years active: 1975–1976; 2012–present
- Members: Eunan Brady; Jimi McDonald; Taj; Andre Gomes; Andy Knott
- Past members: Robert Godfrey; Michael Kane; Richard Grealish; Andy Emm; Geir Waade; John Brown; Mick Jones; Kelvin Cyril Blacklock; Tony James; Brian James; Roland Hot
- Website: thelondonss.com

London SS are a British rock group founded in March 1975 by drummer Geir Waade, bassist John Brown, guitarist Mick Jones, and guitarist Eunan Brady (formerly of the Hollywood Brats). They later became associated with the then new punk rock scene when the Sex Pistols broke in early 1976. In 2012 Brady put together a new lineup, featuring himself along with Jimi McDonald, Taj, Michael Kane, and Andi Emm.

== History ==
The origin of the name "London SS" is disputable. Geir Waade claims to have been the first to propose it:

Andrew Matheson begs to differ, even though every other band member insists that it was immediately following Geir's arrival that the band's old name, 'The Delinquents', was dropped. Brady confirms it was Geir who came up with the replacement name, but John insists it was the result of a general brainstorming session with a dictionary and thesaurus. Obviously, the London prefix was a nod in the direction of The New York Dolls and The Hollywood Brats.

The group's name caused disquiet in some quarters, because "SS" was generally understood to refer to the Schutzstaffel, the infamous paramilitary force of Nazi Germany, at a time when Nazi chic was a trend in UK pop. This came to haunt Mick Jones (who is Jewish) when the Clash became Britain's premier left-wing political band. When questioned about the name, Tony James stated:

We hadn't thought at all about the Nazi implications. It just seemed like a very anarchic, stylish thing to do.

The London SS recruited Kelvin Cyril Blacklock to front their band. Blacklock's arrival led to Geir Waade and Mick Jones's departures. The band then changed its name to Violent Luck.

Even while still with Overtown, Kelvin had kept his options open by attending auditions for several other bands. One of the Melody Maker ads he answered had been placed by bassist Tony James. Tony was reading mathematics at Brunel University in Uxbridge, on the western outskirts of London and living in Twickenham, a few miles to the south.

The second lineup of The London SS started with Blacklock and James. The band spent most of their short history auditioning potential members. Besides Blacklock and James, guitarist Brian James (no relation to Tony James) was the only other semi-permanent member at this time. Other musicians who played with them included Matt Dangerfield and Casino Steel, then members of the Hollywood Brats, who would later go on to play in The Boys. Future Clash bassist Paul Simonon also auditioned for the group, albeit unsuccessfully.

== Recordings ==
London SS's only recording was a demo featuring James, Jones, James, and Hot. Musically, they played straightforward rock 'n' roll and covered 1960s R&B. An example of this is their song "1–2 Crush on You", which was later recorded by the Clash.

The reformed version did release a limited edition demo CD, entitled High Jinks On A Low Budge, which was sold at the Rebellion Festival in 2013, following their successful gig there. They also recorded an EP, whilst they were signed to the French label, Combat Rock Records. The EP is entitled No Beards, No Beerguts, No Beginners.

== Later bands featuring members of the London SS ==
Ultimately, the London SS members were more famous for what they did later than they were for anything that they accomplished during the band's existence. As described by music critic Dave Thompson, the band is "regarded as the testing ground-cum-meeting place for what became a who's-who of punk".

Brian James and Rat Scabies joined Johnny Moped guitarist Ray Burns and backed up music journalist Nick Kent in the shortlived Subterraneans. James and Scabies later formed the Damned. Tony James joined the band Chelsea with Billy Idol and the two later started Generation X. According to Chelsea drummer John Towe,

When Brian James played with London SS he wrote a song called 'Why Won't She Talk' [...] October kept the tune but put new words to the song and re-titled it 'Get Out and Walk'. When he discovered that the tune had been ripped off (early '77) he dropped it from Chelsea's set.

Jones and Simonon teamed up with Joe Strummer and founded the Clash.

Jones and Tony James later worked together in Carbon/Silicon.
