= Benny Di Massa =

English musician (born 1963)

Benny D
- Also known as: Benny D
- Born: Benny Di Massa; 25 April 1963 (age 63); London, England
- Occupation: Producer/Songwriter/Musician
- Instrument: Drums/Guitar

Benny Di Massa (born 25 April 1963) is an English musician and producer. He played drums and guitar for several bands in his early career, including the Cocteau Twins.

== Early life and career ==
Before joining the Cocteaus, he collaborated with various 4AD-affiliated bands throughout the 1980s, such as The Wolfgang Press, A.R. Kane and Frazier Chorus.

In 1994, Benny became the Cocteau Twins' first full-time drummer. His role included recreating Robin Guthrie’s complex drum programming for their live shows.

== Powerstudio and Production Work ==
In the early 2000s, Benny D founded Powerstudio, a premier recording facility based in Central London. As CEO and lead producer, Benny transformed Powerstudio into a respected and creative hub known for its cutting-edge technology and collaborative environment. Powerstudio has become a go-to destination for both established and emerging artists.

Benny has worked with a wide range of artists across various genres, contributing his production and songwriting expertise. Notable collaborations include work with Elton John, Boy George, Stormzy, Sia, The Killers, Robbie Williams, Kylie Minogue, Gary Barlow, Adam Lambert, FKA twigs, Paloma Faith, Shenseea, and Plan B. His work spans both mainstream pop and underground music, showcasing his versatility as a producer.

=== Between 2019 and Current ===
Between 2019 and 2021, Benny D was involved in writing and producing Boy George’s Cool Karaoke Volume 1 (released in 2021) and Culture Club’s latest album Life (released in 2022). Benny also contributed heavily to Boy George’s 60for60 project, which celebrated Boy George’s 60th birthday in 2022 with the release of 60 new songs.

In 2019, Benny, alongside Boy George, wrote and produced music for Lee Cooper advertisements, including the track We Know What We Want, featuring Boy George.

== Artist Development ==
In addition to his work as a producer, Benny is dedicated to artist development. He founded the London Artist Development Programme, designed to mentor and guide emerging talent. The program has helped artists like The Puppini Sisters, Frankie Cocozza, Kye Sones, and Max Milner refine their sound and navigate the music industry.

== Film and Media Contributions ==
In 2010, Benny composed the music for the film Baby, which earned a British Independent Film Award nomination. He was also involved in the production of the song Electric Energy for the film Argylle (2024) which features Boy George’s vocals. Benny played a key role in the vocal production for Boy George on this track, ensuring the vocals were in line with the song's energetic and cinematic feel. His film work is noted for its emotional depth, complementing the visual narrative with carefully crafted soundtracks.
