= Alternative Chartbusters (The Boys album) =

Studio album by the Boys
- Released: 17 March 1978
- Genre: Pop punk
- Label: NEMS
- Producer: Matt Dangerfield & Casino Steel

The Boys chronology
The Boys (1977)	Alternative Chartbusters (1978)	To Hell with the Boys (1979)

Alternative Chartbusters is the second studio album by UK band the Boys, released in 1978. "Brickfield Nights" was the first single.

== Background ==
The Boys released their self-titled debut studio album in November 1977. During the Christmas period, the band released a "Run Rudolph Run" single under the alter ego the Yobs. Alternative Chartbusters sees the band moving away from punk rock into power pop territory.

== Release and reception ==
Professional ratings
Review scores
Source	Rating
Alternative Rock	7/10

While promoting Alternative Chartbusters, the Boys' popularity in mainland Europe had gone mainstream, aided by their work ethic and Hollywood Brats' (which keyboardist Casino Steel was previously in) reputation. Author Dave Thompson, in his book Alternative Rock (2000), wrote: "Boysmania swept Holland; graffiti peppered walls in Norway", though they were mostly ignored in the UK.

Thompson said the band "push[ed] past the rent-a-punk barriers of their debut [album]," while Alternative Chartbusters "peaks with 'Brickfield Nights,' rewriting the rules for solid punk pop-rock."

== Track listing ==
All tracks composed by Casino Steel and Matt Dangerfield; except where indicated

Side A

1. "Brickfield Nights" Lead vocal Matt Dangerfield
2. "U.S.I." (Plain) Lead vocal Kid Reid
3. "Taking On the World" (Reid) Lead vocal Reid
4. "Sway (Quién Será)" (Ruiz) Lead vocal Dangerfield
5. "Do the Contract" Lead vocal Dangerfield
6. "Heroine" Lead vocal Dangerfield
7. "Not Ready" Lead vocal Reid

Side B

1. "Classified Susie" Lead vocal Dangerfield
2. "T.C.P." (Plain) Lead vocal All
3. "Neighbourhood Brats" Lead vocal Dangerfield
4. "Stop Stop Stop" (Allan Clarke, Tony Hicks, Graham Nash) Lead vocal Dangerfield
5. "Backstage Pass" (Plain) Lead vocal Reid
6. "Talking" Lead vocal Dangerfield
7. "Cast of Thousands" Lead vocal Reid

== Personnel ==
- Matt Dangerfield – guitar, vocals
- Kid Reid – bass, vocals
- Honest John Plain – guitar, vocals
- Casino Steel – piano, vocals
- Jack Black – drums
