= Andrew Matheson (musician) =

British-Canadian musician (1952/1953–2025)

Andrew Matheson (1952 or 1953 – 31 May 2025) was a Canadian-British rock singer, most noted as a founding member of the British proto-punk band Hollywood Brats in the early 1970s. He later released two solo albums, and garnered a Juno Award nomination for Best New Solo Artist at the Juno Awards of 1995.

Sources are in conflict about Matheson's background. In Canadian media, he was reported as spending his childhood in the Chelmsford neighbourhood of Sudbury, Ontario before moving to London at age 18, while British sources state that he grew up in Gillingham, Kent as the son of a serviceman in the Royal Navy. He formed Hollywood Brats in 1971, at the age of 18. Although championed by Keith Moon and later recognized as an important early punk band which had a significant influence on many of the bands who would later have success with the genre, the band had little commercial success while active and released only one album before breaking up in 1975. Matheson was then involved in the short-lived band London SS.

Matheson released the solo album Monterey Shoes in 1979, spawning the single 'True Romance'. He later moved to Toronto, where he released the album Night of the Bastard Moon in 1994 and was nominated for Best New Solo Artist at the Junos in 1995. While living in Toronto, he also performed with the rock band Slash Puppet, including some Hollywood Brats songs in their performance repertoire. He did not release another album in Canada, and moved back to England sometime after 1995.

In 2015, he published a memoir of the band, Sick On You: The Disastrous Story of Britain's Great Lost Punk Band, named after one of the Hollywood Brats' songs.

The Hollywood Brats played a one-off reunion gig on 31 August 2019, at Nell's Jazz & Blues, London. Matheson performed with Casino Steel and Eunan Brady under the guise of The Hollywood Brats for the first time in 45 years. The set-list included 'Tumble With Me', 'Chez Maximes', 'Courtesan' and 'Sick On You'. Matheson was joined on stage by Bob Geldof as they performed The Kinks' 'I Need You' to a sold-out crowd.

Bonnie Raitt's eighteenth studio album, Just Like That..., released in April 2022, included the track, 'Blame It On Me', which was co-written by Matheson.

Matheson died in London on 31 May 2025.
