= Curly (song) =

- Spanish release picture sleeve

Single by The Move
- B-side: "This Time Tomorrow"
- Released: July 1969
- Recorded: 1969
- Genre: Pop
- Length: 2:45
- Label: Regal Zonophone (UK); A&M (US)
- Songwriter: Roy Wood
- Producer: Roy Wood

The Move singles chronology
"Blackberry Way" (1968)	"Curly" (1969)	"Brontosaurus" (1970)

"Curly" is a song by the English rock group The Move. It was written and produced by Roy Wood and released in July 1969 (with the B-side "This Time Tomorrow"). In the 19 July 1969 edition of Melody Maker, Chris Welch said the song was "an obvious success for The Move". Released as a single only, it was later included on the remastered versions of Looking On (in 1998) and Shazam in (2007).

The song peaked at number 12 in the UK Singles Chart, and was the last single by the band to feature Carl Wayne before his departure, as well as the first with Rick Price replacing Trevor Burton on bass guitar. The instrumentation is mainly acoustic, and Roy Wood was featured on multi-tracked recorder as well as acoustic guitar and short a cappella harmonies, with a mellotron appearing briefly.

Wood disliked the song, describing it as "really corny" and saying that he was unhappy with the record label's decision to release it as a single over other songs that he preferred. The song was also disliked by the band's drummer Bev Bevan, who thought it was too pop and sugary.
