= When Alice Comes Back to the Farm =

Single by The Move

from the album Looking On
- B-side: "What?"
- Released: 9 October 1970
- Recorded: 1970
- Genre: Hard rock
- Length: 3:15
- Label: Fly (UK)
- Songwriter: Roy Wood
- Producers: Roy Wood, Jeff Lynne

The Move singles chronology
| "Brontosaurus" (1970) | "When Alice Comes Back to the Farm" (1970) | "Turkish Tram Conductor Blues" (1971) |

"When Alice Comes Back to the Farm" is a rock-blues song recorded by The Move and written and sung by Roy Wood, who also produced the track alongside fellow member Jeff Lynne. The song was first released as a single on 9 October 1970, backed with "What?", before it became the fourth track on the band's third studio album, Looking On, issued on 11 December. Musically, it is a hard rock song and featured Wood playing slide guitar, cello and baritone saxophone, reinforcing Rick Price's bassline.

== Background and recording ==
A potential B-side, an untitled "10538 Overture", recorded on 12 July 1970, ended up being used by the members as the first Electric Light Orchestra single rather than the B-side. Two weeks prior to the song's recording, Wood had bought a "cheap Chinese cello" for 15 pounds and had messed around with the instrument, with the recordings later being used for both "10538 Overture" and "When Alice Comes Back to the Farm".

The genre itself is a mix of proto-glam rock and early heavy metal, with influences from the blues. The song shows similar instrumentation to the band's previous single, "Brontosaurus".

== Release ==
Taken from the 1970 album Looking On and released as a single on the Fly record label, both "Alice" and Looking On failed to chart, with "Alice" not charting largely due to lack of airplay by BBC radio stations, despite an appearance on Top of the Pops. The song allegedly made mild references to cannabis—"Alice", "time for tearing out the weeds", and the last line "don't get around much anymore", which is a description of the singer's condition rather than a reference to the Duke Ellington song.

It was released around the same time as T. Rex's hit single "Ride a White Swan", with both singles released on the Fly record label. In English-speaking countries (Austria, Ireland, United Kingdom and New Zealand), the B-side was "What?", but in Austria and Germany, a Move track "Kilroy Was Here" was instead opted as a B-side.

== Track listing ==
7" single release (1970)

1. "When Alice Comes Back to the Back" – 3:40
2. "What?" – 6:44

7" single release (1970; Germany & Austria)

1. "When Alice Comes Back to the Farm" – 3:40
2. "Kilroy Was Here" – 2:43

== Personnel ==
The Move

- Roy Wood - vocals, slide guitar, cello, baritone saxophone
- Jeff Lynne - piano, guitar
- Bev Bevan - drums, percussion
- Rick Price - bass

Additional personnel

- Roger Wake - engineering
- Roy Wood - production
- Jeff Lynne - production
