= Looking On =

Studio album by the Move
- Released: 11 December 1970
- Recorded: May–September 1970
- Studios: Advision and Philips (London)
- Genre: Hard rock
- Length: 44:10
- Labels: Fly (UK); Capitol (US)
- Producers: Roy Wood; Jeff Lynne

The Move chronology
Shazam (1970)	Looking On (1970)	Message from the Country (1971)

Singles from Looking On
- 1. "Brontosaurus" Released: 6 March 1970; 2. "When Alice Comes Back to the Farm" Released: 9 October 1970; 3. "Turkish Tram Conductor Blues" Released: January 1971

Looking On is the third studio album by the English rock band the Move, released in the UK in December 1970. The album is their first to feature Jeff Lynne, their first containing entirely original compositions, and the first on the Fly label, its catalogue number being FLY 1. It includes both their 1970 singles, the Top 10 hit "Brontosaurus," released on Regal Zonophone in March, and the less successful "When Alice Comes Back To The Farm," released on Fly in October. "Turkish Tram Conductor Blues" was also released as a single for the album in Germany.

Looking On presents the band dabbling in heavy metal ("Brontosaurus"), blues ("When Alice Comes Back to the Farm", "Turkish Tram Conductor Blues"), prog-style epics ("Open Up Said the World at the Door"), soul ("Feel Too Good"), and, in the case of the title track, all four styles mashed together. It's also the first album to feature Roy Wood and Jeff Lynne as a tandem, with Wood’s use of cello and woodwinds and Lynne's use of piano in addition to guitars and vocals, reflecting the work they were pursuing in The Electric Light Orchestra, the debut album of which they were recording at the same time. The jazzy fills on the title track also serve as a signpost of the style that Wood would later develop in Wizzard and the Wizzo Band.

== Background ==
The Move was effectively a dead band walking when Lynne joined in February 1970 after fronting (and producing) The Idle Race. Wood had wanted to launch a new group with Lynne that would feature rock and strings and retire the Move immediately. According to Wood, none of the members of The Move had any interest in the band at this point; Lynne in particular had joined the band solely so that he could get the separate orchestral project started with Wood. But contractual obligations and management pressure kept the band name kicking, regardless of the drastic changes in sound and the unwillingness of the personnel.

Wood and Lynne took the opportunity to begin work on the embryonic Electric Light Orchestra (ELO) project in the studio and get the Move off the road, for the most part—the occasional live set in 1970 usually featured most of the tracks on Looking On, a cover of The Beatles' "She's a Woman," and one of The Move's singles, "I Can Hear The Grass Grow".

The album ends with a hidden track, a doo-wop-style coda, "The Duke of Edinburgh's Lettuce", which, although uncredited, is usually attributed to Wood and Lynne together.

== Cover art ==
The cover is a photo from the record company's archives, depicting a high angle shot of a crowd of people. It was taken years before to be used for the Move, but had not seen print before this point.

== Reception and legacy ==
Professional ratings
Review scores
Source	Rating
Allmusic	3/5 stars
Christgau's Record Guide	C+

Just as Shazam was overlooked on store shelves in the wake of Carl Wayne's departure and Wood's new, wild on-stage persona, Looking On was overlooked in excitement over the debut of the Electric Light Orchestra. Fly chose not to promote it extensively, in part because the Move had left the company to join EMI's new Harvest Records label shortly after sessions for the album were completed.

Looking On was regarded by some critics as uneven, noodling, and self-indulgent. Drummer Bev Bevan told journalist Mark Paytress that even he felt the LP was "ploddy" in the liner notes of the 2008 reissue of the album. "Brontosaurus" was covered by Move fans Cheap Trick, and "Feel Too Good" was later featured on the soundtrack of the movie Boogie Nights as well as in the pilot episode of the UK series Life on Mars. Looking On has been reissued on CD with various combinations of bonus tracks, including in 1998 by Repertoire, in 2008 by Salvo and by Esoteric Recordings in 2016.

== Track listing ==
=== Side One ===
1. "Looking On" (Roy Wood) – 7:48
2. "Turkish Tram Conductor Blues" (Wood; formerly credited to Bev Bevan) – 4:38)
3. "What?" (Jeff Lynne) – 6:42
4. "When Alice Comes Back to the Farm" (Wood) – 3:40

=== Side Two ===
1. "Open Up Said the World at the Door" (Lynne) – 7:10
2. "Brontosaurus" (Wood) – 4:25
3. "Feel Too Good" (Wood) – 8:12
4. "The Duke Of Edinburgh's Lettuce" (Lynne/Wood) - 1:27 (hidden track)

=== Bonus tracks (1998 reissue) ===
8. "Wild Tiger Woman" (Wood)
9. "Omnibus" (Wood)
10. "Blackberry Way" (Wood)
11. "Something" (Morgan)
12. "Curly" (Wood)
13. "This Time Tomorrow" (Morgan)
14. "Lightning Never Strikes Twice" (Rick Price, Tyler)
15. "Something" [Italian] (Morgan)
16. "Wild Tiger Woman Blues" (Wood)
17. "Curly Where's Your Girlie" (Wood)

=== Bonus tracks (2008 reissue) ===
8. "Lightnin' Never Strikes Twice" (Price/Tyler)
9. "Looking On Part 1" (take 3; rough mix) (Wood)
10. "Looking On Part 2" (take 12; rough mix) (Wood)
11. "Turkish Tram Conductor Blues" (take 5; rough mix) (Wood)
12. "Open Up Said the World at the Door" (take 4; rough mix) (Lynne)
13. "Feel Too Good" (take 11 extract; rough mix) (Wood)
14. "The Duke of Edinburgh's Lettuce" (take 2; rough mix) (Wood/Lynne)

=== Bonus tracks (2016 reissue) ===
Disc One:

8. "Lightnin' Never Strikes Twice" (Price/Tyler)

Disc Two:

1. "The Duke of Edinburgh's Lettuce" (Wood/Lynne)
2. "Looking On" (part one - take 3 / part two - take 12) (Wood)
3. "Brontosaurus" (mono US radio promo edit) (Wood)
4. "Turkish Tram Conductor Blues" (take 5; rough mix) (Wood)
5. "She's a Woman" (BBC session, recorded 23 March 1970) (Lennon/McCartney)
6. "Bev Bevan interview" (BBC session, recorded 23 March 1970)
7. "Brontosaurus" (BBC session, recorded 23 March 1970) (Wood)
8. "Falling Forever" (BBC session, recorded 23 March 1970) (Lynne)
9. "Lightnin' Never Strikes Twice" (BBC session, recorded 23 March 1970) (Price/Tyler)
10. "Looking On" (BBC session, recorded 28 July 1970) (Wood)
11. "When Alice Comes Back to the Farm" (BBC session, recorded 28 July 1970) (Wood)
12. "Bev Bevan and Roy Wood interview" (BBC session, recorded 28 July 1970)
13. "She's a Woman" (BBC session, recorded 28 July 1970) (Lennon/McCartney)

== Personnel ==
- Roy Wood – lead vocals (except on "What" and "Lightning Never Strikes Twice"), oboe, sitar, banjo, slide guitar, cello, guitars, bass (on "Feel Too Good"), saxophones
- Jeff Lynne – piano, guitars, percussion, drums (on "Feel Too Good"), lead vocals (on "What" and "Open Up Said the World at the Door")
- Bev Bevan – drums, percussion
- Rick Price – bass, lead vocal (on "Lightning Never Strikes Twice")
- P.P. Arnold and Doris Troy – backing vocals on "Feel Too Good"
