= Brontosaurus (The Move song) =

Single by the Move

from the album Looking On
- B-side: "Lightning Never Strikes Twice"
- Released: 6 March 1970
- Genre: Hard rock; art rock; power pop
- Length: 4:25
- Label: Regal Zonophone
- Songwriter: Roy Wood
- Producer: Roy Wood

The Move singles chronology
"Curly" (1969)	"Brontosaurus" (1970)	"When Alice Comes Back to the Farm" (1970)

"Brontosaurus" is a song by rock group the Move, written, sung and produced by Move guitarist Roy Wood. The song was released as the lead single to the band's third studio album, Looking On, on 6 March 1970, with the B-side "Lightning Never Strikes Twice". The song later became the sixth track on the album when it released on 11 December that year. It reached number 7 in the UK Singles Chart during April 1970, and number 36 in Canada. The song was covered by the American power pop act Cheap Trick.

== Release ==
Released as a single early in 1970, it was also included on the band's Looking On album near the end of that year. With its aggressive guitar riff and growling vocal, the song marked a major shift in sound compared to their previous, more pop-oriented singles, bearing a much closer resemblance to their most recent album, Shazam.

This song was recorded shortly after former Idle Race front man Jeff Lynne had joined. Lynne had been recruited into the group with the main aim of developing the embryonic Electric Light Orchestra, though they were contractually required to keep The Move (with their proven track record as a hit singles outfit) functioning in order to help finance the new project. This single (including its B-side, "Lightning Never Strikes Twice") was the only Move production after Lynne's addition that was credited solely to Wood; all subsequent releases (including the first ELO album) were credited to both Wood and Lynne.

When The Move promoted "Brontosaurus" on Top of the Pops on BBC TV, Wood - who had never appeared on television as the group's frontman before - appeared in the makeup that he would use extensively with Wizzard.

== Track listings ==
7" single (1970 release)

1. "Brontosaurus – 4:27
2. "Lightning Never Strikes Twice" – 3:00

7" EP (1970 release)

1. "Brontosaurus" – 4:27
2. "Weekend" – 1:48
3. "Lightning Never Strikes Twice" – 3:00
4. "Kilroy Was Here" – 2:45

== Personnel ==
- Roy Wood - vocals, guitars
- Jeff Lynne - guitars, pianos
- Bev Bevan - drums, percussion
- Rick Price - bass
