= Shazam (album) =

Studio album by the Move
- Released: 27 February 1970
- Studio: Advision, London
- Genre: Progressive rock
- Length: 39:13
- Label: Regal Zonophone (UK); A&M (US)
- Producer: Roy Wood; Carl Wayne; Rick Price; Gerald Chevin

The Move chronology
Something Else from The Move (1968)	Shazam (1970)	Looking On (1970)

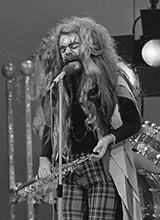
Roy Wood (1974), who helped in producing the album

Shazam is the second studio album by English rock band the Move, released on 27 February 1970 by Regal Zonophone Records in the UK and A&M Records in the US. The album was produced by group members Roy Wood, Carl Wayne, Rick Price, alongside Gerald Chevin, and was recorded in Advision Studios in London. The album is a progressive rock record that almost entirely consists of covers (with the exception of the song "Beautiful Daughter") and marked a bridge between the group's quirky late 1960s pop singles (alongside their debut studio album) and the more aggressive, hard rock, long-form style of their later albums.

The album, unlike their debut, did not chart at all, starting a pattern of the band's albums failing to hit the UK Albums Chart, and whilst a single release was planned of "Beautiful Daughter", the release was ultimately cancelled due to vocalist Carl Wayne's departure from the group soon after the album was released. As such, it was the band's last album to feature the singer, who would eventually be replaced by Jeff Lynne, a member who had previously joined in 1969, after the recording sessions of the album concluded. The album is also the last to feature bassist/vocalist Trevor Burton, who left to pursue a career in blues (although his specific contributions are unknown) and the first to feature his replacement, Rick Price.

== Background and recording ==
When the band released the single "Blackberry Way" on 28 November, 1968, the single hit number one in the UK in 1969. The single's success reinforced bassist/vocalist Trevor Burton's feelings that the band had become too commercial. He quit shortly thereafter and was replaced by Rick Price, and the February 1969 American tour was cancelled because of this. The band spent most of 1969 on the cabaret circuit in England, which vocalist Carl Wayne eventually adjusted to but Rick Price and guitarist/vocalist Roy Wood loathed. When a new American tour was launched later that year, it was a financial failure and a logistical farce. Due to shoddy planning, the band was forced to race across the country by car (and a U-Haul trailer) to make very few dates. During this time, they loosened up their performance and played at a louder volume, and the relationship between Wood and Wayne - who had always had different personalities and temperaments - was being severely tested.

Due in part to their hectic touring schedule, by the time of the recording sessions Wood (at the time the band's only songwriter) had only one new song written, "Beautiful Daughter". As such, though numerous spoken word sections were added to both pad out the album's length and give it the appearance of a concept, Shazam was essentially the Move's 1969 stage act captured on record: a mixture of California psychedelia, heavy metal riffs, thundering drums, and interpolations from classic composers. The shortage of new material also meant that, even with the band re-recording a track from their first album ("Cherry Blossom Clinic"), the bulk of Shazam (33 of its 39 minutes) had to be devoted to cover songs. These include a medley of works which were in the public domain and so could be listed on the album as part of Wood's composition "Cherry Blossom Clinic Revisited" without giving any credit to their composers.

"Hello Susie" had previously been a hit for Amen Corner, though their faster, more pop-oriented version was markedly different from the Move's heavy metal treatment. "Cherry Blossom Clinic Revisited" is a re-recording of "Cherry Blossom Clinic", taken at a slower pace, not a sequel song. The first verse was diffidently spoken by Wayne, and the track was recorded without any strings or brass. Wood recalled that the album's one new song, "Beautiful Daughter", "just sort of happened. I think I based it around the chord sequences on that. I based the whole song around the chords. I did a lot of open string work on that and it worked quite well."

The band's management wanted Wood to be the album's producer, but the other members of the band objected and virtually the entire band ended up getting involved in the production. Wayne in particular had been frustrated at his shrinking voice in the group, and was allowed to choose most of the cover songs included on the album. While drummer Bev Bevan regards this as his favourite Move album, Wood said the album does not hold up, adding that "I think it was probably down to the fact that we weren't together personally as a band. We weren't pulling in the same direction. I always feel if you're having a good time in the studio it actually comes across on the tape and that was a bit of a miserable album for us."

Wood reckoned The Move had gone as far as it could go, short of breaking through in America, and wanted to launch a new strings-and-rock project with Jeff Lynne, which would become The Electric Light Orchestra (ELO). Wayne, however, still saw potential in the band and wanted to return to their roots with short sharp tracks. He even attempted to persuade the others to allow him to continue the Move without them, possibly by bringing Burton and original bassist Ace Kefford back in the band, while Wood, Price, and Bevan all moved on to ELO project and Wood could continue to write songs for The Move, but Price, Wood and Bevan rejected his suggestion.

According to Wayne, his reason for leaving the band was Wood's dislike for playing the cabaret circuit, with the final trigger being a show in Sheffield in January 1970, in which Wood threw a glass at a cabaret patron. Wayne quit the band just before Shazam was released, and was replaced by guitarist/piano/vocalist/songwriter Jeff Lynne who, having rejected Wood's first invitation to join the Move because he wanted to stay with The Idle Race, agreed to join on the condition that they retire The Move and focus full-time on ELO.

== Cover art ==
The cover was drawn by Mike Sheridan, Roy Wood's former bandmate in Mike Sheridan and the Nightriders. The cover depicts all of the Move members as superheroes. with letters on their chest that spell out the world "MOVE". The cover was later referenced in the cover art for the band's single "Brontosaurus", where the band is depicted with a similar look to their appearance in the cover art of Shazam, although they are mostly obscured by the song's namesake, a Brontosaurus.

== Release ==
The album was not a commercial success in the UK. The hit single "Brontosaurus" debuted a fortnight after Shazam hit the stores, and was the first recording to feature Lynne, stealing considerable press and record buyer attention away from Shazam. In the US, when it debuted on A&M Records, the heavy feel, tight harmonies, and extended solos made it a cult favourite and the record that introduced most American fans to the band. It also proved to be a stylistic template for successful 1970s bands, such as Cheap Trick and Kiss.

=== Critical reception ===
Professional ratings
Review scores
Source	Rating
AllMusic	5/5 stars
Christgau's Record Guide	B−

Reviewing for The Village Voice in 1970, Robert Christgau said the album is "one version of an overly self-conscious mode (in the perception if not the creation) which I call stupid-rock. This is compelling when played loud, but it is also full of annoying distractions, musical and otherwise." John Mendelsohn of Rolling Stone gave the album a positive review, ending with a plea "Do what you can to prevent this from being the last Move album... ...The Move must be kept going to give us more albums like this one".

In a retrospective review, AllMusic editor Stephen Thomas Erlewine said the "short-yet-sprawling" album reflected the band's growth into a "muscular and weirder" group. Erlewine said that, although the variety of musical ideas may be intimidating to listeners, the album rewards repeated listens, and the Move "may never have been better than they are here".

== Track listing ==
Side one
No.	Title	Writer(s)	Lead vocals	Length
1.	"Hello Susie" (Originally by Amen Corner)	Roy Wood	Roy Wood	4:55
2.	"Beautiful Daughter"	Wood	Carl Wayne	2:36
3.	"Cherry Blossom Clinic Revisited"	Wood (Note: The coda of the song includes an uncredited medley of themes from Jesu, Joy of Man's Desiring by Johann Sebastian Bach, The Sorcerer's Apprentice by Paul Dukas, and The Nutcracker by Pyotr Ilyich Tchaikovsky.)	Wayne with Wood, spoken word by Bev Bevan	8:40
Total length:				15:11

Side two
No.	Title	Writer(s)	Lead vocals	Length
4.	"Fields of People" (Originally by Ars Nova)	Wyatt Day; Jon Pierson	Wayne	10:09
5.	"Don't Make My Baby Blue" (Originally by Frankie Laine)	Barry Mann; Cynthia Weil	Wayne	6:18
6.	"The Last Thing on My Mind" (Originally by Tom Paxton)	Tom Paxton	Wayne, Wood and Rick Price	7:35
Total length:				24:02

Bonus Tracks (2007 reissue)
No.	Title	Writer(s)	Lead vocals	Length
1.	"This Time Tomorrow"	Dave Morgan	Price	3:40
2.	"A Certain Something"	Morgan	Wayne	3:45
3.	"Curly" (Alternate mix)	Wood	Wood and Wayne	2:54
4.	"Wild Tiger Woman" (Stereo mix)	Wood	Wayne, Wood and Trevor Burton	2:55
5.	"Omnibus" (Full-length version)	Wood	Wayne and Wood	4:11
6.	"That Certain Something" (Demo version)	Morgan	Wayne	3:58
7.	"This Time Tomorrow" (Demo version)	Morgan	Price	2:36
8.	"Blackberry Way" (Alternate mix)	Wood	Wood	3:38
Total length:				27:37

== Personnel ==
- Roy Wood - vocals, guitars, keyboards
- Bev Bevan - drums, percussion
- Carl Wayne - vocals
- Rick Price - vocals, bass
- Trevor Burton - bass (prior to leaving the band, which tracks unknown)
- Tony Visconti - bass on "Beautiful Daughter"

"Beautiful Daughter" features an uncredited string quartet.
