= Tonight (The Move song) =

Single by The Move
- B-side: "Don't Mess Me Up" (UK) "My Marge" (US)
- Released: May 1971
- Recorded: 1971
- Studio: Philips (London)
- Length: 3:15
- Label: Harvest (UK); Capitol (US)
- Songwriter(s): Roy Wood
- Producer(s): Roy Wood, Jeff Lynne

The Move singles chronology
"Turkish Tram Conductor Blues" (1971)	"Tonight" (1971)	"Chinatown" (1971)

"Tonight" is a song recorded by The Move and was written by Roy Wood originally for pop vocal group The New Seekers. Jeff Lynne, who had joined the group the previous year, took lead vocal on the third verse. Released in 1971, The Move's version was their first single release on the Harvest label, and charted at number 11 on the UK Singles Chart. The single was issued in the US on Capitol. The United Artists reissue 45 was issued as the single for their 1972 Split Ends compilation. In Denmark, it charted at number seven. The song peaked at number 89 in Australia. Record World, when reviewing the song with Split Ends, mentioned how "this cut from the Split Ends album should move up the charts with speed."
