= Blackberry Way =

- German picture sleeve

Single by the Move
- B-side: "Something"
- Released: 28 November 1968 (UK)
- Recorded: 1968
- Studio: Olympic Studios, London
- Genre: Baroque pop
- Length: 3:38
- Label: Regal Zonophone (UK); A&M (US)
- Songwriter: Roy Wood
- Producer: Jimmy Miller

The Move singles chronology
"Wild Tiger Woman" (1968)	"Blackberry Way" (1968)	"Curly" (1969)

Performance video
- "Blackberry Way" (on Beat Club) on YouTube

"Blackberry Way" is a 1968 single by British band The Move. Written by the band's guitarist/vocalist Roy Wood and produced by Jimmy Miller, "Blackberry Way" was a bleak counterpoint to the sunny psychedelia of earlier recordings. It nevertheless became the band's most successful single, reaching number 1 on the UK singles chart in February 1969.

The Move vocalist Carl Wayne refused to sing on the song, so Wood handled the lead vocal. Richard Tandy, who later played keyboards with Wood's next band Electric Light Orchestra (ELO), played harpsichord on "Blackberry Way". Despite the success of the single, the style of psychedelia-tinged pop sat uneasily with guitarist Trevor Burton. He left the group shortly after. The B-side, "Something", was specially written for the band by David Scott-Morgan and was produced by Denny Cordell and Tony Visconti. The song had previously been released as the B-side to the United States and Australia exclusive single "Yellow Rainbow", released for their debut studio album, Move.

Wood said in a 1994 interview that "Blackberry Way" is his favourite Move song of all time, commenting that it could have been performed in any era and still worked. As for album releases of "Blackberry Way", although it did not appear on the band's second studio album, Shazam, it did appear on the album's 2007 reissue, after also appearing on the 1998 reissue of the band's third studio album, Looking On.

== Personnel ==
The Move

- Roy Wood – lead and backing vocals, guitar, sitar
- Trevor Burton – bass, backing vocal
- Bev Bevan – drums

Additional musicians

- Richard Tandy – harpsichord
- Uncredited – Mellotron

== Charts ==
Chart (1968–1969)	Peak position
Australia (Go-Set)	14
Austria (Ö3 Austria Top 40)	14
Belgium (Ultratop 50 Flanders)	13
Belgium (Ultratop 50 Wallonia)	20
Denmark (Salgshitlisterne Top 20)	17
Denmark (Tipparaden)	5
Finland (Soumen Virallinen)	23
Ireland (IRMA)	2
Italy (Musica e dischi)	15
Netherlands (Dutch Top 40)	15
Netherlands (Single Top 100)	14
New Zealand (Listener)	10
Norway (VG-lista)	3
Rhodesia (Lyons Maid)	4
Sweden (Kvällstoppen)	7
Sweden (Tio i Topp)	5
UK Singles (OCC)	1
West Germany (GfK)	7

== Cover versions ==
- In 1969, Italian band Equipe 84 produced a cover version (with Italian lyrics by lyricist Mogol), named "Tutta mia la città" ("All the town is mine"), which became a hit in Italy.
- UK alternative rock band The Wonder Stuff released a version of the song on one of their series of EPs titled From the Midlands with Love in 2012.
