= Chinatown (The Move song) =

Single by The Move
- B-side: "Down on the Bay"
- Released: October 1971
- Recorded: 1971
- Studio: Philips (London)
- Length: 3:06
- Label: Harvest (UK); MGM (US) (withdrawn); United Artists (US)
- Songwriter: Roy Wood
- Producers: Roy Wood, Jeff Lynne

The Move singles chronology
"Tonight" (1971)	"Chinatown" (1971)	"California Man" (1972)

"Chinatown" is a single performed by English band The Move. Released in 1971, the song reached number 23 on the UK Singles Chart. It was recorded at the same time as the band's alter-ego Electric Light Orchestra were laying down tracks for their first album. In the US, the single (with an edited version of "Chinatown") was issued on MGM, but quickly withdrawn (probably before regular stock copies were pressed, although yellow label promos have been seen). The single with the same edit was almost immediately issued on United Artists. The B-side was the Jeff Lynne-penned song "Down on the Bay".

Former Move vocalist Carl Wayne said it was his favourite single by the band. Record World said that the Move "sound[ed] ready to move with this artfully crafted side of Anglo-pop." Dink Lorance, reviewing the Split Ends album which included the song, described it as 'a bit of "ah so" rock 'n' roll'.

== Personnel ==
- Roy Wood — vocals, guitar, bass
- Jeff Lynne — vocals, guitar
- Bev Bevan — drums, percussion
