= List of songs written by Roy Wood =

This is a list of songs written by the English singer-songwriter Roy Wood.

== Released songs ==
Title	Year	Album	Ensemble	Notes
"Aerial Pictures"	1982	Single	Carl Wayne	
"Airborne"	2006	Roy Wood – The Wizzard!	Solo	
"All the Way Over the Hill"/"Irish Loafer (And His Hen)"	1973	Boulders	Solo	
"Angel Fingers (A Teen Ballad)"	1973	Single	Wizzard	
"Another Night"	1979	On the Road Again	Solo	
"Another Wrong Night"	1977	Super Active Wizzo	Wizzo Band	
"Any Time Will Do"	1975	Mustard	Solo	
"Are You Ready to Rock"	1974	Single	Wizzard	
"Backtown Sinner"	1979	On the Road Again	Solo	
"The Battle of Marston Moor (July 2nd 1644)"	1971	The Electric Light Orchestra	The Electric Light Orchestra	
"Ball Park Incident"	1972	Single	Wizzard	
"Beautiful Daughter"	1970	Shazam	The Move	
"Ben Crawley Steel Company"	1971	Message from the Country	The Move	
"Bengal Jig"	1975	Single	Solo	
"Blackberry Way"	1968	Single	The Move	
"Brand New 88"	1974	Introducing Eddy and the Falcons	Wizzard	
"Brontosaurus"	1970	Looking On	The Move	
"Buffalo Station" / "Get On Down to Memphis"	1973	Wizzard Brew	Wizzard	
"California Man"	1971	Message from the Country	The Move	
"Cherry Blossom Clinic"	1968	Move	The Move	Intended as the Move's fourth single
"Cherry Blossom Clinic Revisited"	1970	Shazam	The Move	
"Chinatown"	1971	Message from the Country	The Move	
"Colourful Lady"	1979	On the Road Again	Solo	
"Come Back Karen"	1974	Introducing Eddy and the Falcons	Wizzard	
"Crazy Jeans"	1974	Introducing Eddy and the Falcons	Wizzard	
"Curly"	1969	Single	The Move	
"Dance Around the Maypole"	1969	Single	Acid Gallery	
"Dancin' At the Rainbow's End"	1979	On the Road Again	Solo	
"Dear Elaine"	1973	Boulders	Solo	
"Disturbance"	1966	Single	The Move	
"Don't You Feel Better"	1975	Main Street	Wizzard	
"Down to Zero"	1980	Single	Solo	
"Dreams of Unwin"	1974	Single	Wizzard	
"The Driving Song"	1981	Single	Roy Wood's Helicopters	
"The Duke of Edinburgh's Lettuce"	1970	Looking On	The Move	Co-written by Jeff Lynne
"Earthrise"	1977	Super Active Wizzo	Wizzo Band	Co-written by Dick Plant
"Eddy's Rock"	1974	Introducing Eddy and the Falcons	Wizzard	
"Ella James"	1971	Message from the Country	The Move	
"Everyday I Wonder"	1974	Introducing Eddy and the Falcons	Wizzard	
"Farewell"	1973	Single	Ayshea	
"Feel Too Good"	1970	Looking On	The Move	
"Fire Brigade"	1968	Move	The Move	
"The Fire in His Guitar"	1975	Main Street	Wizzard	
"The Fugitive"	1966	Move (2016 remastered edition)	The Move	
"First Movement (Jumping Biz)"	1971	The Electric Light Orchestra	The Electric Light Orchestra	
"Flowers in the Rain"	1967	Move	The Move	
"Forever"	1973	Single	Solo	
"French Perfume"	1975	Main Street	Wizzard	
"Get On Down Home"	1975	Mustard	Solo	
"Giant Footsteps (Jubilee)"	1977	Super Active Wizzo	Wizzo Band	Co-written by Annie Haslam and Dave Donovan
"The Girl Outside"	1968	Move	The Move	
"Givin' Your Heart Away"	1980	Single	Roy Wood's Helicopters	
"Goin' Down the Road"	1974	Single	Solo	
"Gotta Crush (About You)"	1973	Wizzard Brew	Wizzard	
"Green Glass Windows"	1981	Single	Roy Wood's Helicopters	
"Hazel Eyes"	1974	Single	Neil Reid	
"Hello Susie"	1970	Shazam	The Move	
"(Here We Go Round) The Lemon Tree"	1967	Single	The Idle Race	
"Hot Cars"	1987	Starting Up	Solo	
"Human Cannonball"	1975	Look Thru the Eyes of Roy Wood and Wizzard	Wizzard	
"I Can Hear the Grass Grow"	1967	Single	The Move	
"I Dun Lotsa Cryin' Over You"	1974	Introducing Eddy and the Falcons	Wizzard	
"Indiana Rainbow"	1975	Main Street	Wizzard	
"I Never Believed In Love"	1977	Single	Annie Haslam & Roy Wood	
"Interlude"	1975	Mustard	Solo	
"Intro"	1974	Introducing Eddy and the Falcons	Wizzard	
"I Should Have Known"	1975	Main Street	Wizzard	
"It Wasn't My Idea to Dance"	1971	Message from the Country	The Move	
"It's Not Easy"	1982	Single	Solo	
"I Wish It Could Be Christmas Everyday"	1973	Single	Wizzard	
"Jimmy Lad"	1979	On the Road Again	Solo	
"Jolly Cup of Tea"	1973	Wizzard Brew	Wizzard	
"Keep It Steady"	1987	Starting Up	Solo	
"Keep Your Hands On the Wheel"	1979	On the Road Again	Solo	
"Kilroy Was Here"	1968	Move	The Move	
"Life is Wonderful"	1977	Super Active Wizzo	Wizzo Band	
"Lion's Heart"	1995	Single	The Roy Wood Big Band	
"Look at Me Now"	1971	The Electric Light Orchestra	The Electric Light Orchestra	
"Looking On"	1970	Looking On	The Move	
"Look Thru' the Eyes of a Fool"	1975	Mustard	Solo	
"Main Street"	1975	Main Street	Wizzard	
"Make Them Understand"	1965	Single	Mike Sheridan's Lot	Wood's first song to be published
"Meet Me at the Jailhouse"	1973	Wizzard Brew	Wizzard	
"Miss Clarke and the Computer"	1973	Boulders	Solo	
"Mist on a Monday Morning"	1968	Move	The Move	
"Moonriser"	1982	Single	Solo	
"Music to Commit Suicide By"	1973	Single	Solo	
"Move"	1966	Anthology 1966-1972	The Move	
"Mustard"	1975	Mustard	Solo	
"My Christmas Card to You"	2009	My Christmas Card to You	The Shooting Stars	Co-written by Mike Read and Elliot Frisby
"My Marge"	1971	Message from the Country	The Move	Co-written by Jeff Lynne
"Nancy Sing Me a Song"	1973	Boulders	Solo	
"New York City"	2011	Roy Wood - Music Book	Roy Wood Rock & Roll Band	
"Night of Fear"	1966	Single	The Move	
"Oh What a Shame"	1975	Single	Solo	
"Olympic Flyer"	1980	Single	Solo	
"Omnibus"	1968	Single	The Move	
"On Top of the World"	1985	Single	Solo	
"O.T.T."	1982	Single	Solo	
"The Premium Bond Theme"	1974	Single	Solo	
"The Rain Came Down on Everything"	1975	Mustard	Solo	
"Raining in the City"	1987	Starting Up	Solo	
"Rattlesnake Roll"	1975	Single	Wizzard	
"Red Cars Are After Me"	1987	Starting Up	Solo	
"Road Rocket"	1979	On the Road Again	Solo	
"Rock 'n' Roll Winter (Loony's Tune)"	1974	Single	Wizzard	
"Rock City"	1980	Single	Roy Wood's Helicopters	
"Rock Down Low"	1973	Boulders	Solo	
Rock Medley: "Rockin’ Shoes"/"She's Too Good for Me"/"Locomotive"	1973	Boulders	Solo	
"Rockin' on the Stage"	1983	Single	The Rockers	Co-written by Phil Lynott.
"Saxmaniacs"	1975	Main Street	Wizzard	
"See My Baby Jive"	1973	Single	Wizzard	
"Ships in the Night"	1987	Starting Up	Solo	
"Sing Out the Old (Bring in the New)"	1980	Single	Solo	
"Sneakin'"	1977	Super Active Wizzo	Wizzo Band	
"The Song"	1975	Mustard	Solo	
"Songs of Praise"	1973	Boulders	Solo	
"Starting Up"	1987	Starting Up	Solo	
"The Stroll"	1977	Single	Wizzo Band	
"Take My Hand"	1975	Main Street	Wizzard	
"The Thing Is This (This Is The Thing)"	1976	Single	Wizzard	
"This Is the Story of My Love (Baby)"	1974	Introducing Eddy and the Falcons	Wizzard	
"Tonight"	1971	Message from the Country	The Move	
"Turkish Tram Conductor Blues"	1970	Looking On	The Move	Credited to Bev Bevan
"Turn Your Body to the Light"	1987	Starting Up	Solo	
"Under Fire"	1985	Single	Solo	
"Until Your Mama's Gone"	1971	Message from the Country	The Move	
"Useless Information"	1968	Move	The Move	
"Vote For Me"	1967	Anthology 1966-1972	The Move	Intended as the B-side to "Cherry Blossom Clinic"
"Waitin' at This Door"	1977	Super Active Wizzo	Wizzo Band	
"Wake Up"	1973	Boulders	Solo	
"Walk Upon the Water"	1968	Move	The Move	
"Watch this Space"	1980	Single	Solo	
"Wave the Flag and Stop the Train"	1967	Single	The Move	
"Way Beyond the Rain"	1979	On the Road Again	Solo	
"We Are the Boys (Who Make All the Noise)"	1983	Single	The Rockers	
"Wear a Fast Gun"	1973	Wizzard Brew	Wizzard	
"We're Gonna Rock 'n' Roll Tonight"	1974	Introducing Eddy and the Falcons	Wizzard	
"(We're) On the Road Again"	1979	On the Road Again	Solo	
"When Alice Comes Back to the Farm"	1970	Looking On	The Move	
"When Gran'ma Plays the Banjo"	1973	Boulders	Solo	
"Whisper in the Night"	1971	The Electric Light Orchestra	The Electric Light Orchestra	
"Why Does Such a Pretty Girl Sing Such Sad Songs"	1975	Mustard	Solo	
"Wild Tiger Woman"	1968	Single	The Move	
"Wings Over the Sea"	1979	On the Road Again	Solo	
"Winter Song"	1966	Move (2016 remastered edition)	The Move	
"Yellow Rainbow"	1968	Move	The Move	
"You Can Dance Your Rock 'n' Roll"	1973	Wizzard Brew	Wizzard	
"You Got Me Runnin'"	1974	Introducing Eddy and the Falcons	Wizzard	
"You're the One I Need"	1966	Anthology 1966-1972	The Move	
"You Sure Got It Now"	1975	Mustard	Solo	
