= The Light Shines On =

Greatest hits album by Electric Light Orchestra
- Released: April 1977
- Recorded: 1970–73
- Genres: Progressive rock, art rock
- Length: 45:58
- Label: Harvest
- Producers: Roy Wood, Jeff Lynne

Electric Light Orchestra chronology
A New World Record (1976)	The Light Shines On (1977)	Out of the Blue (1977)

Professional ratings
Review scores
Source	Rating
AllMusic	2/5 stars
Encyclopedia of Popular Music	3/5 stars
MusicHound	1.5/5
Record Mirror	3/5 stars

The Light Shines On is a compilation album by Electric Light Orchestra (ELO). This is the second Harvest compilation of their early years with the label, followed in 1979 by volume 2. It features 5 tracks from ELO's debut album, 3 tracks from their second album and the non album single Showdown, although both 10538 Overture and Roll Over Beethoven are the single edits. The full length versions are featured on volume 2.

== Track listing ==
Side one

#	Title	Writer	Album	Length
1	"Roll Over Beethoven (Single version)"	Chuck Berry	ELO 2 (1973)	4:32
2	"In Old England Town (Boogie #2) (Instrumental)"	Jeff Lynne	ELO 2 (1973)	6:56
3	"Look at Me Now"	Roy Wood	The Electric Light Orchestra (1971)	3:17
4	"Momma"	Jeff Lynne	ELO 2 (1973)	7:03
5	"Showdown"	Jeff Lynne	On the Third Day (1973)	4:09

Side two

#	Title	Writer	Album	Length
1	"Mr. Radio"	Jeff Lynne	The Electric Light Orchestra (1971)	5:04
2	"The Battle of Marston Moor (July 2nd, 1644)"	Roy Wood	The Electric Light Orchestra (1971)	6:03
3	"Whisper in the Night"	Roy Wood	The Electric Light Orchestra (1971)	4:50
4	"10538 Overture (Single version)"	Jeff Lynne	The Electric Light Orchestra (1971)	4:04

== Personnel ==
- Jeff Lynne – bass, percussion, piano, guitar, vocals, Moog synthesizer
- Roy Wood – guitar, bass, clarinet, percussion, bassoon, cello, oboe, recorder, vocals, slide guitar
- Bev Bevan – percussion, drums
- Bill Hunt – French horn
- Steve Woolam – violin
- Mike de Albuquerque – bass, vocals
- Mike Edwards – cello
- Wilfred Gibson – violin
- Richard Tandy – Moog synthesizer, piano, guitar, harmonium
- Colin Walker – cello

== Certifications ==
Region	Certification	Certified units/sales
United Kingdom (BPI)	Silver	60,000^{^}
^{^} Shipments figures based on certification alone.
