= The Light Shines On Vol 2 =

Greatest hits album by Electric Light Orchestra
- Released: 6 April 1979
- Recorded: 1970–1972
- Genre: Progressive rock
- Label: Harvest
- Producer: Roy Wood, Jeff Lynne

Electric Light Orchestra chronology
Three Light Years (1978)	The Light Shines On Vol 2 (1979)	Discovery (1979)

Professional ratings
Review scores
Source	Rating
Encyclopedia of Popular Music	3/5 stars

The Light Shines On Vol 2 is a compilation album by Electric Light Orchestra (ELO). Released in 1979 by Harvest Records as a follow-up to 1977's The Light Shines On, it is a compilation of their early years with the label.

== Track listing ==
Side one

#	Title	Writer	Album	Length
1	"10538 Overture" (Full Length Version)	Jeff Lynne	The Electric Light Orchestra (1971)	5:28
2	"First Movement (Jumping Biz)"	Roy Wood	The Electric Light Orchestra (1971)	2:57
3	"In Old England Town (Boogie #2)"	Jeff Lynne	ELO 2 (1973)	6:50
4	"Manhattan Rumble"	Jeff Lynne	The Electric Light Orchestra (1971)	4:19
5	"From the Sun to the World (Boogie #1)"	Jeff Lynne	ELO 2 (1973)	8:13

Side two

#	Title	Writer	Album	Length
1	"Kuiama"	Jeff Lynne	ELO 2 (1973)	11:12
2	"Nellie Takes Her Bow"	Jeff Lynne	The Electric Light Orchestra (1971)	5:54
3	"Queen of the Hours"	Jeff Lynne	The Electric Light Orchestra (1971)	3:59
4	"Roll Over Beethoven" (Full length version)	Chuck Berry	ELO 2 (1973)	6:58

== Personnel ==
- Jeff Lynne – bass guitar, percussion, piano, guitar, vocals, Moog synthesizer
- Roy Wood – guitar, bass guitar, clarinet, percussion, Krumhorn, cello, Shawm, Recorder, vocals, Slide Guitar
- Bev Bevan – percussion, drums
- Bill Hunt – French Horn
- Steve Woolam – violin
- Mike de Albuquerque – bass guitar, vocals
- Mike Edwards – cello
- Wilfred Gibson – violin
- Richard Tandy – Moog synthesizer, piano, guitar, Harmonium
- Colin Walker – cello
