= On the Road Again (Roy Wood album) =

Studio album by Roy Wood
- Released: August 1979
- Studios: Rockfield, Monmouthshire; AIR, London; DJM, London; Utopia, London; The Music Centre, Wembley; Lea Sound, Pelsall
- Genre: Pop rock
- Label: Warner Bros.
- Producer: Roy Wood

Roy Wood chronology
Mustard (1975)	On the Road Again (1979)	Starting Up (1987)

Singles from On the Road Again
- 1. "Keep Your Hands on the Wheel (Said Marie to the Driver)" Released: 1978; 2. "(We're) On the Road Again" Released: 1979

On the Road Again is the third solo album by Roy Wood.

The album was released only due to the intervention of Warner Bros. boss Mo Ostin. Still, it was only released in the United States, Germany and the Netherlands.

The album includes guest appearances from Carl Wayne, Andy Fairweather-Low and John Bonham.

== Promotion ==
Two singles were released from the album: "Keep Your Hands on the Wheel" (with Wizzo Band's "Giant Footsteps", from their only album Super Active Wizzo, on the B-side and the title track (with Wizzard's "Saxmaniacs", an instrumental from the then-unreleased album Main Street, on the b-side).

"Dancing at the Rainbow's End" was also released as a single, but credited to Wizzo Band.

== Critical reception ==
Professional ratings
Review scores
Source	Rating
AllMusic	2.5/5 stars
Christgau's Record Guide	C
MusicHound Rock: The Essential Album Guide	2/5 stars

The Globe and Mail wrote that "the music is slightly more interesting than your average brand of pop-rock, with at least a half-dozen moments of pure inspiration."

== Track listing ==
1. "(We're) On the Road Again" – 4:22
2. "Wings over the Sea" – 3:11
3. "Keep Your Hands on the Wheel (Said Marie to the Driver)" – 4:16
4. "Colourful Lady" – 5:06
5. "Road Rocket" – 3:27
6. "Backtown Sinner" – 4:12
7. "Jimmy Lad" – 4:28
8. "Dancin' at the Rainbow's End" – 3:35
9. "Another Night" – 3:23
10. "Way Beyond the Rain" – 5:33

== Personnel ==
- Roy Wood – lead and backing vocals, electric and acoustic guitars, slide guitar, bass guitar, drums; soprano, alto, tenor and baritone saxophones; mandolin, sitar, cello, double bass, violin, bass clarinet, recorders, bagpipes, tuba, vibraphone, percussion
- Paul Robbins – synthesizers, piano, electric piano, clavinet, electric and acoustic guitars, recorders, backing vocals
- Pete Mackie – bass guitar, electric guitar, sound effects, backing and lead vocals
- Billy Paul – alto saxophone, accordion, backing vocals
- Dave Donovan – drums
- John Bonham – drums
- Charlie Grima – congas
- Andy Fairweather Low – backing vocals
- Annie Haslam – backing vocals
- Carl Wayne – backing vocals
- Dick Plant – backing vocals
