= Look at Me Now (Electric Light Orchestra song) =

1971 song by the Electric Light Orchestra

Song by the Electric Light Orchestra

from the album The Electric Light Orchestra
- Released: 1971
- Recorded: 31 December 1970–June 1971
- Studio: Philips (London)
- Genre: Baroque pop
- Length: 3:17
- Label: Harvest
- Songwriter(s): Roy Wood
- Producer(s): Roy Wood; Jeff Lynne

"Look at Me Now" is a 1971 song by the Electric Light Orchestra (ELO), featured on the band's debut album The Electric Light Orchestra (1971). It was written by singer-songwriter Roy Wood and was the second track on the album. Wood plays all the instruments in the song.

== Background ==
The song takes large inspiration from The Beatles' "Eleanor Rigby", a fact that several critics note.

== Composition and lyrics ==
"Look at Me Now" follows a grim, dark narrative about the murder of a former lover, which leads to several ghostly presences. The instrumentation includes woodwind instruments such as clarinet, oboe, and recorder, while also having string instruments like the guitar and the cello, the song having a strong reliance on the latter.

== Critical reception ==
Bruce Eder of AllMusic described the track as a "sweet, melodic follow-up" to The Move's "Beautiful Daughter" (also written by Wood).

== Personnel ==
Electric Light Orchestra

- Roy Wood – vocals, cello, clarinet, oboe, classical guitar, recorder,

Additional personnel

- Roger Wake - engineering
- Pete Cliff - engineering
