= Mr. Radio =

Song by Electric Light Orchestra

from the album The Electric Light Orchestra (No Answer)
- Released: 1971
- Recorded: 1970 – 1971
- Studio: Philips (London)
- Genre: Baroque pop
- Length: 5:04
- Label: Harvest (UK); United Artists (US)
- Songwriter: Jeff Lynne
- Producers: Roy Wood, Jeff Lynne

"Mr. Radio" is a song written by Jeff Lynne and recorded by the Electric Light Orchestra from their 1971 debut album, The Electric Light Orchestra (No Answer in the US).

== Background ==
The tune is written in a 1920s American style about a man whose wife has left him and his only companion is his radio.

The beginning and the end of the number contains backwards samples of a Mozart symphony, and in the bridge section there is a distantly heard piece of backmasking, with Lynne singing, "Hello, Mr. Radio," which is flipped backwards and augmented with reverberation.

== Single version ==
The song was the scheduled as the second single release from the band's debut album, however it remained unreleased.

The single edit can be found on a 2005 compilation album, Harvest Showdown and on the Harvest Years 1970-1973 compilation.

A remastered version would later appear on the 40th anniversary version of the band's first album.

== Personnel ==
- Jeff Lynne – vocals, piano
- Roy Wood – cello
- Bev Bevan – drums, percussion
- Bill Hunt – french horn
- Steve Woolam – violin
