= Red Cars Are After Me =

1987 song by Roy Wood

Song by Roy Wood

from the album Starting Up
- Released: February 1987
- Recorded: 1985–86
- Genre: Rock music
- Length: 3:55
- Label: Legacy
- Songwriter(s): Roy Wood
- Producer(s): Roy Wood

Red Cars Are After Me is a song made and produced by Roy Wood from the year 1987. It was released in Starting Up and was the first song in the album. Wood plays every instrument in the song and album overall. It was also included in Look Thru' The Eyes of Roy Wood, a compilation album that consists of songs from 1974 to 1987.

The song starts in a factory-sounding beat, which is then followed by saxophones and guitars, and the paranoiac narrator singing about red cars following him. Both the front and back cover of the Starting Up album contain a red car, possibly a Jaguar XJS, which is a nod to the song.

== Personnel ==
- Roy Wood – drums, guitars, saxophone, vocals, bass
- Louis Clark – conducting, arrangement
