= Dear Elaine =

Single by Roy Wood

from the album Boulders
- B-side: "Songs of Praise"
- Released: 11 August 1973
- Genre: Baroque pop
- Length: 4:09
- Label: Harvest Records (HAR 5074)
- Songwriter: Roy Wood
- Producer: Roy Wood

Roy Wood singles chronology
"When Gran'ma Plays the Banjo" (1972)	"Dear Elaine" (1973)	"Forever" (1973)

"Dear Elaine" is a song written and produced by Roy Wood. It was first released on Wood's July 1973 debut solo album, Boulders, before being issued as a single on 11 August 1973. Wood played all of the musical instruments on the recording, as well as supplying lead and multi-tracked backing vocals. The song was globally published by Essex Music International, Inc. (ASCAP).

The track reached number 18 in the UK Singles Chart. The single remained in the UK chart for eight weeks.

"Dear Elaine" was a "semi-classical" experimental pop song reminiscent of Pink Floyd and Queen. It featured a slow tempo, with Wood singing with acoustic guitar, French horns and bass, alongside sporadic usage of Wood's multitracked choir.

In 1994, Wood stated, "Even though we didn't actually record it as the Move, I had already written "Dear Elaine", which I subsequently put on the Boulders solo album. I thought that was probably the best song I'd written at that time".

The track has appeared on numerous compilation albums, including Wood's own Singles (1993, Connoisseur Records). The track is still played on national radio, with BBC Radio airing it in January 2019.

== Reception ==
Sounds magazine, in its July 1973 edition, described the song as "a charming, eccentric, gentle record from one of rock's real craftsmen. It may be too languid for popular success but it's a lovely record anyway. Ignore it at your peril".
