= Oh What a Shame =

Single by Roy Wood
- B-side: "Bengal Jig"
- Released: May 1975
- Recorded: 1975
- Genre: Pop music
- Length: 3:51
- Label: Jet Records (JET 754) (UK), United Artists Records (US)
- Songwriter(s): Roy Wood
- Producer(s): Roy Wood

Roy Wood singles chronology
"Goin' Down the Road" (1974)	"Oh What a Shame" (1975)	"Look Thru' the Eyes of a Fool" (1975)

"Oh What a Shame" is a 1975 single, which was written and produced by Roy Wood. Wood played all of the musical instruments on the recording, as well as supplying lead and multi-tracked backing vocals. The song was jointly globally published by Carlin Music Corp and Roy Wood Music.

The track reached number 13 in the UK Singles Chart. The single remained in the UK chart for seven weeks, starting in May 1975. It was also released as a single in Belgium, Australia, Netherlands, Ireland and the US. The single was the final solo Wood recording to reach the UK Singles Chart. In 1977, two years after "Oh What A Shame" left the UK Top 20, Wood commented, "I've written something like 30 hit songs, you know? It's not easy now to accept that I'm not a success anymore".

"Oh What a Shame" has appeared on numerous compilation albums, including Wood's own Singles (1993, Connoisseur Records). and Exotic Mixture: Best of Singles A's & B's (1999). It also appeared on the 1999 expanded CD reissue of Wood's 1975 album, Mustard.

The record still commands national radio play in the UK; the most recent airing being on BBC Radio 2's Pick of the Pops on 6 July 2019.
