= Mustard (album) =

Studio album by Roy Wood
- Released: December 1975
- Studio: Phonogram (London, UK); De Lane Lea (London, UK)
- Genre: Rock; pop; art rock; glam rock; jazz rock; psychedelia; blues rock; heavy metal
- Length: 42:12
- Label: Jet
- Producer: Roy Wood

Roy Wood chronology
Boulders (1973)	Mustard (1975)	On the Road Again (1979)

Singles from Mustard
- 1. "Look Thru the Eyes of a Fool" Released: November 1975; 2. "Any Old Time Will Do" Released: May 1976

Mustard is the second solo album by English musician Roy Wood, released in December 1975 by Jet Records. The album was recorded at De Lane Lea Studios and Phonogram Studios, although a dispute at one of the studios delayed the release of the album. Produced and entirely performed by Wood, who also designed the album artwork, Mustard was a departure from his previous solo album Boulders (1973), with a more ambitious approach and denser, more layered production, again mixing a number of musical styles. Annie Haslam and Phil Everly contributed guest vocals to the album; Wood's influences on the record included the Andrews Sisters, the Beach Boys and Led Zeppelin.

Upon release, the album was a commercial failure, failing to chart in the United Kingdom or United States, likewise the singles "Look Thru the Eyes of the Fool" and "Any Old Time Will Do", reflecting Wood's declining popularity. However, contemporary reviews were generally positive, highlighting the album's ambitious sound. Retrospective reception has also been favourable, and today the album is considered by some critics to be one of the highlights of Wood's career. Edsel Records re-released the album on CD in 1999 with numerous bonus tracks, followed in 2019 with a further CD release by Esoteric Recordings.

== Background and recording ==
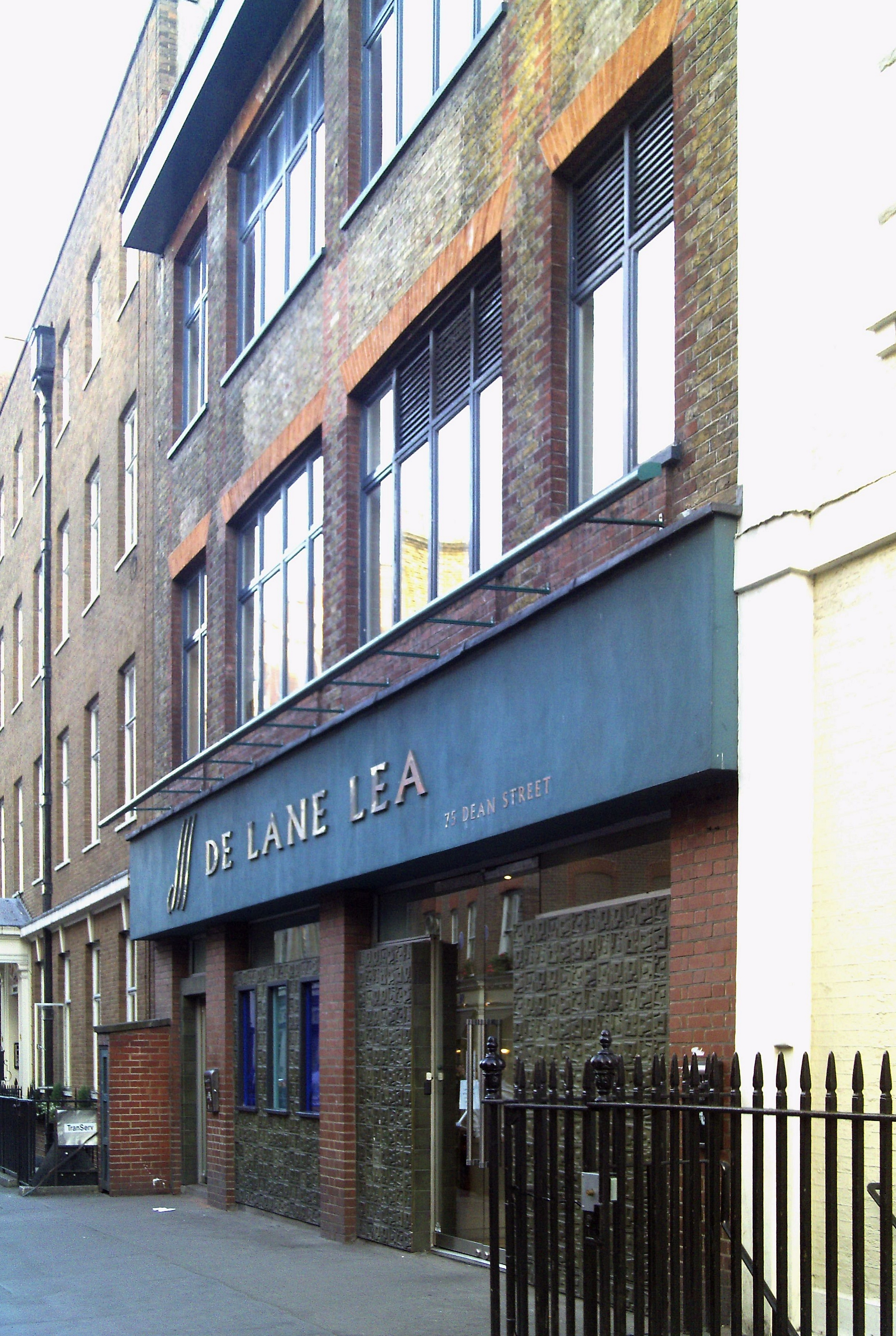
De Lane Lea Studios in London, where half of Mustard was recorded.

In 1973, Roy Wood released his debut solo album Boulders, on which he performed virtually every instrument, and achieved hits with his band Wizzard, including the UK number one singles "See My Baby Jive" and "Angel Fingers". He also released the eccentric, rock and roll-inspired Wizzard albums Wizzard Brew (1973) and Introducing Eddy and the Falcons (1974) in this period, reflecting Wood's drastic recording commitment which also led to the recording of Mustard. As he later explained in an interview promoting Mustard: "I have to do four albums a year plus singles, and I don't know many people who have to do so much work." In the run-up to the release of the album, Wood fulfilled a long-time desire when he began using the bagpipes in his work, including onstage where he tuned the drones in order to play Scottish marches, although he found the instruments difficult to maintain due to different temperatures affecting their pitch, and also punctured a set. Despite his difficulties, he used the bagpipes on the album.

Over a period of 18 months, Mustard was recorded at De Lane Lea Studios, North West London and later Phonogram Studios in South London. The change in studios was due to an unspecified dispute at De Lane Lea, halfway through the recording of the album. While Wood handled the remainder of the recording in Phonogram, several tracks were left in the first studio and he could not retrieve them until the dispute was settled, thus leaving him unsure of when the album could be released, even after recording had finished. Dick Plant and Mike Pela engineered the Dea Lane Lea sessions and Pete Oliff, Roger Wake and Steve Brown engineered at Phonogram. Also credited as an engineer, Wood produced and performed the entire album alone, in addition to painting the album cover and cartoons in the centrefold. Wood explained that he believed solo albums should feature a sole performer, as opposed to artists who hire session musicians like "flippin' Leon Russell and so on" to contribute ideas. He also considered it easier to record without having to explain some of his "strange songs" to a session group.

When writing material for the album, Wood explained he would consider the instrumentation he desired to use on specific songs and then "just build it up track by track and see how it goes". In a contemporary interview, he said he worked better under pressure, and would finish writing tracks in the studio. The only other contributors to the album were vocalists Annie Haslam, who appears on "The Rain Came Down on Everything", and Phil Everly, who appears on "Get On Down Home". The latter had been influential on Wood, who had previously recreated the sound of Everly's group the Everly Brothers during part of the "Rock Medley" on Boulders. Wood achieved the recording of what resembles a choir by playing "a sort of musical chairs", according to Jack Lewis of the Daily Mirror. The musician explained: "I hopped into one chair and sang. Then I sat in another and harmonised. I kept doing this with twenty-five chairs. Then I mixed it and got a good choir sound. I suppose I could have hired the Luton Girls, but I enjoy doing it this way." The album was completed in 1975 in time for release in the Christmas market, where Wood had fared well previously.

== Composition ==
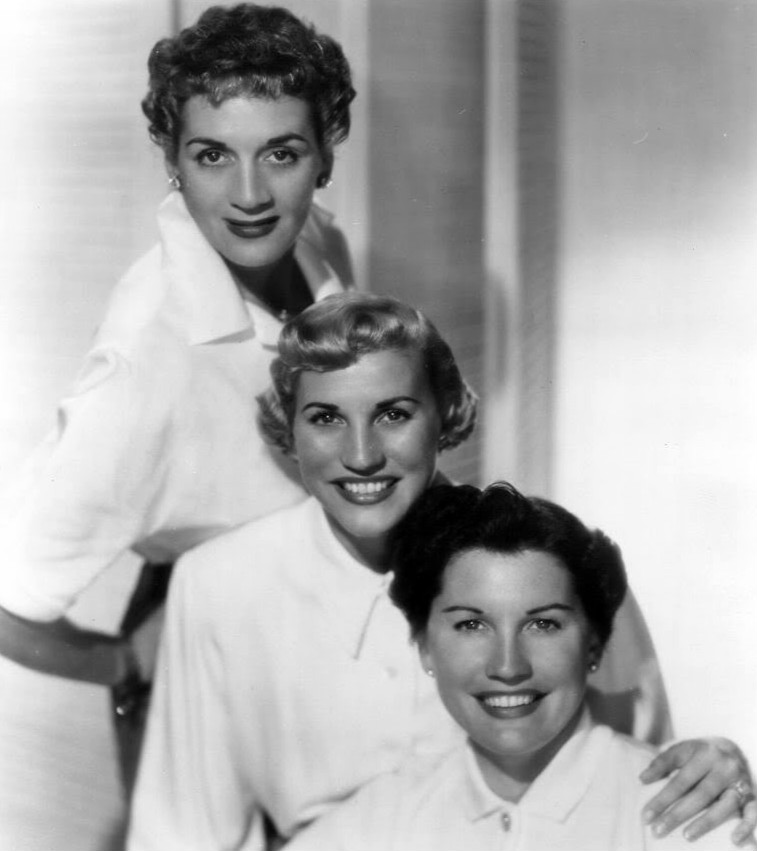
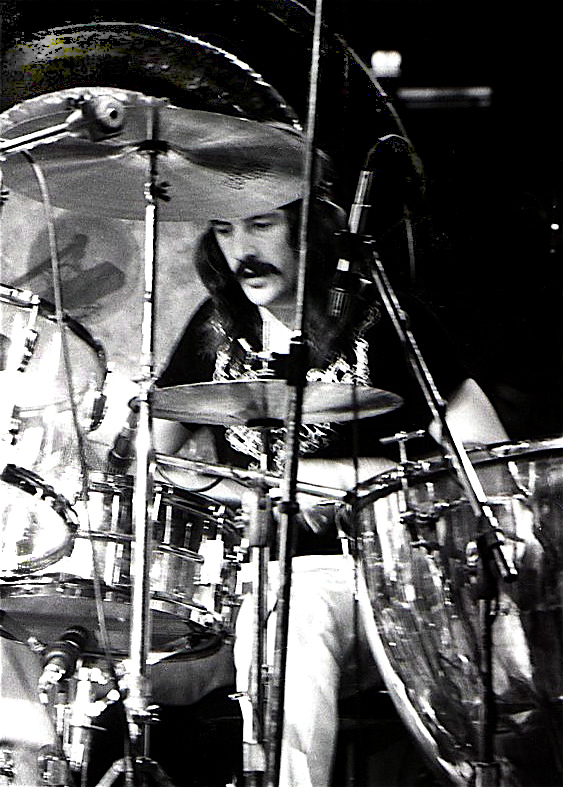
The Andrews Sisters (left), who influenced several songs on Mustard, and John Bonham (right), the inspiration behind the drum solo on the closing "Get On Down Home".

According to Wood, while Mustard is the follow-up album to Boulders, it is "also quite a different mixture of songs". Unlike Boulders – which Stephen Thomas Erlewine describes as a pastoral, homemade-style "collection of pop vignettes" – Mustard is a more fully fledged pop album, lessening the amount of studio effects and absurdist humour in favour of a grander sound, with chiming keyboards, densely layered harmonies and vast production, with Erlewine describing each song as "an epic pop extravaganza in miniature". Wood based the album's songs on different styles, although Brian Wilson remained a large influence on the composition.

The opening title track is a 90-second jingle performed in the style of dance band-era group the Andrews Sisters, with harmonies achieved by Wood's sped-up vocal tapes and a scratchy sound quality intended to make the recording sound like a 1940s radio show, before concluding in fake applause. "Any Old Time Will Do" is a straightforward, melodic song, while "The Rain Came Down on Everything" is a ballad with a medieval, quasi-classical style, featuring an atmospheric intro of choral singing and eerie noises and a crescendo with Wagnerian-style operatic vocals, harmonies, harps and heavy drums, eventually culminating in the sound of a thunderstorm.

Beginning with a soundscape of saxophone effects and a distorted siren, "You Sure Got It Now" was intended by Wood to sound like "the Andrews Sisters backed by John Mayall", and features the album's heaviest use of unusual studio effects and Wood's absurdist humour. Writer Philip Auslander felt the song's opening section, with its classical-styled passage and electronic sounds reminiscent of busy telephone signals, proved Wood was "welcoming us into a chaotic realm where anything is possible", noting the diverse usage of both musical and noise elements. In the main body of the song, Wood sings in different imitative vocal styles, exemplifying how the musician switches between his natural singing voice and others throughout the album.

"Why Does Such a Pretty Girl Sing Those Sad Songs" is a subtler song influenced by the Beach Boys, while "The Song" is a lengthy ballad with a string backing, although vocals only feature in the first two minutes, the rest of the recording being a funeral march-style instrumental section. "Look Thru the Eyes of a Fool" was described by Betrock as "a crisp and exciting updating of Goffin-King via Spector's 'Da Do Ron Ron'", and again exhibits a Beach Boys influence. The 85-second "Interlude" features a chanted melody that is repeated in its second half on bagpipes; Wood described the track as beginning with "Beach Boys type harmonies" before changing into "a Band of the Royal Scots type of thing". Multi-segmented in composition, the closing song "Get on Down Home" is Wood's tribute to Led Zeppelin, featuring a heavy metal style and a two-minute drum solo in the style of John Bonham.

== Release and promotion ==
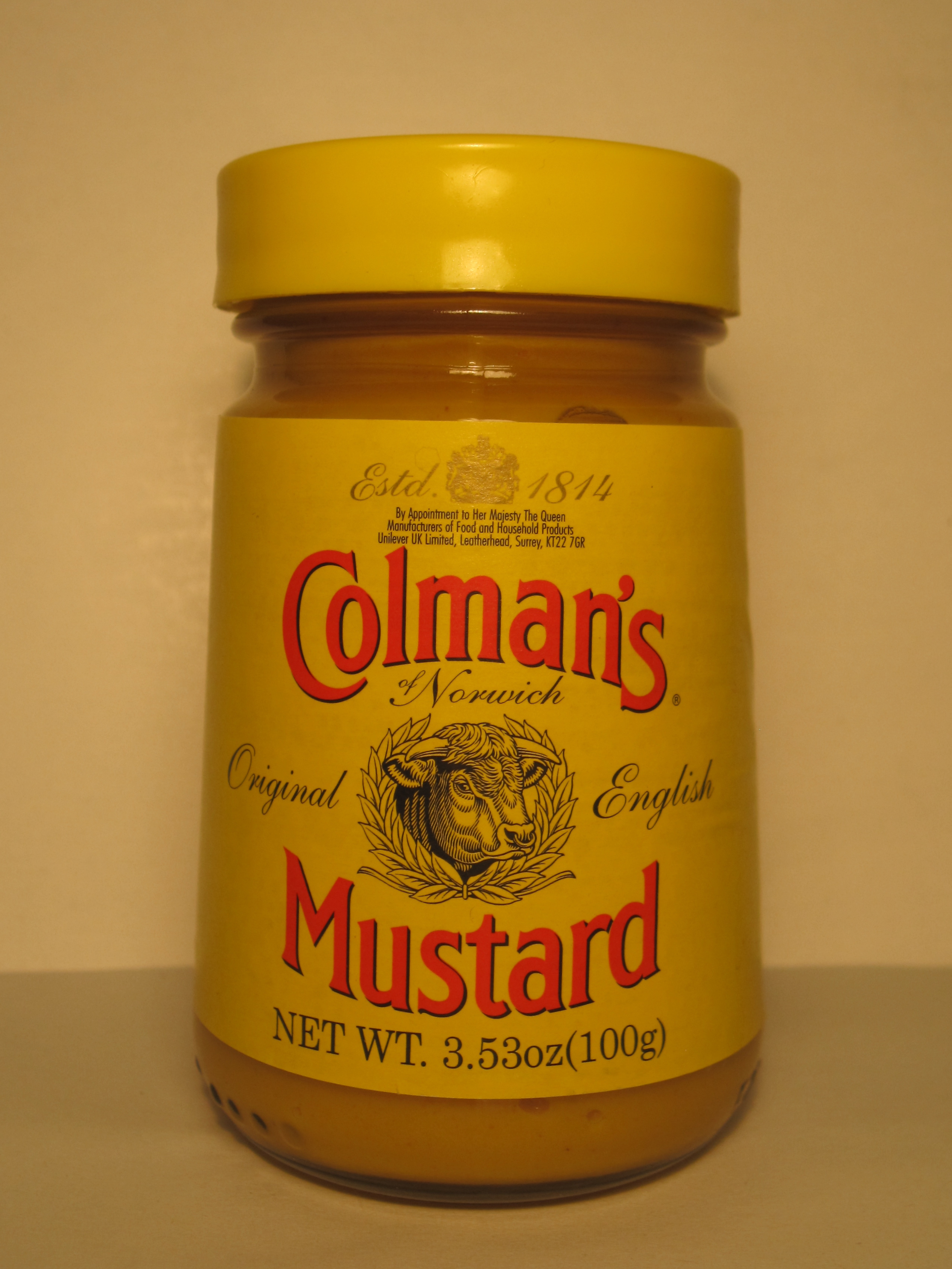
To promote Mustard, Jet Records co-operated with Colman's by giving away jars of the brand's mustard in competitions.

Although the studio dispute delayed release of Mustard, Wood had been discussing the album in interviews for almost two years before its eventual appearance. Having left Harvest Records, Wood signed to Jet Records in 1975 for the record's release. In November, Record Mirror & Disc ran a competition in which participants could win copies of Wood's albums, a Mustard T-shirt, a one-gallon jar of Colman's mustard with Wood's autograph, a stereo system and a trip to London to meet Wood. The Colman's mustard giveaway was arranged by Jet Records in co-operation with the brand. Wood chose "Look Thru the Eyes of a Fool" as the lead single from Mustard for release the same month. In a turn of fortunes for Wood, it failed to chart in the United Kingdom or the United States, where Wood was still signed to United Artists Records. Ray Fox-Cumming of Record Mirror & Disc said the single was "lost in the Christmas rush" and could have been more successful if Wood performed it on Top of the Pops. Wood felt the song would have sounded "a mess" to Radio 1 listeners who did not own stereo radios and thus could not appreciate the "things whizzing about all over the place", and wished in hindsight he had "put a good Tony Blackburn mix on it".

When released in December 1975, Mustard similarly failed to appear on the UK Albums Chart or US Billboard 200. This was in stark contrast to Boulders, which was a UK Top 20 album two years earlier. Biographer Bruce Eder wrote that both albums "were too idiosyncratic to achieve major followings". A further single, "Any Old Time Will Do", was released in May 1976 with "The Rain Came Down on Everything" or "Why Does a Pretty Girl Sing Those Sad Songs" variably included as the B-side, and continued Wood's string of non-charting singles. Despite the album's under-performance, Wood told Fox-Cumming in a March 1976 interview that he considered Mustard to be better than Boulders, as well as containing stronger production. He added: "When I did Boulders it was the first and I'd got no yardstick to measure it by." Wood hoped to play at the Royal Festival Hall in London in Christmas 1975, playing songs from his solo albums with an orchestra, but the plan was cancelled due to a limited time-frame for planning. In 1977, the album was reissued under the name The Wizzard Roy Wood being bookended by 2 additional tracks previously released as singles.

== Critical reception and legacy ==
Professional ratings
Review scores
Source	Rating
AllMusic	4.5/5 stars
Encyclopedia of Popular Music	3/5 stars

In a contemporary review for Sounds, Jonh Ingham hailed Wood as "pop's lovable eccentric, answerable only to himself", and conceded that, despite minor drawbacks, Mustard largely showed "undiluted good Roy Wood, which is to say humorous, full of memorable melodies and well over the top with neat noises and effects". Alan Betrock of Phonograph Record felt the album was "a highly respectable effort" that was perhaps indicative that Wood "may be leaving his roots behind and once again planning to create adventurous and original modern pop". He nonetheless felt some songs were too lengthy and dense with layered styles, rehashing "previously overworked territory". A reviewer for Stereo Review deemed the album inferior to Wizzard's Introducing Eddy and the Falcons, but highlighted the title track and "You Sure Got It Now" as songs "that would be outstanding in any company". Peter Harvey of Record Mirror & Disc hailed Wood's multiple talents but felt he worked too hard on Mustard, calling it "a complex mish-mash of styles and ideas which only add up to the eccentric experimenting of a studio/musical dilettante". He did however hail the "camp" style of the title track and "You Sure Got It Now" as "a refreshing progression".

In 1999, Edsel Records released a CD edition of Mustard with seven bonus tracks, all of which were A- or B-sides to non-album singles. In a review of the Edsel reissue, Stephen Thomas Erlewine of AllMusic hailed Mustard as "a shining, glittering pop record" with an attractively smooth flow, and concluded that "Mustard might not equal the brilliantly maverick Boulders, yet it's easily one of the best, most cohesive records Wood ever made and one of the few to capture him as a (relatively) focused pop craftsman." Alexis Petridis of The Guardian considers Boulders and Mustard to be "extraordinary, maverick solo albums", while Michael Bonner of Uncut views the albums as the "twin high points" of Wood's career. Colin Larkin, writing in The Virgin Encyclopedia of Popular Music, considers both albums to be "uneven", but notes how they revealed Wood's "surplus creative energies as a multi-instrumentalist, engineer, producer and even sleeve designer". A further CD release of the album was issued in 2019 by Esoteric Records, with liner notes by Malcolm Dome.

== Track listing ==
All songs written by Roy Wood except "Can't Help My Feelings" written by Bob Brady. Bonus tracks with brackets indicate the listed artist of the song.

=== Side one ===
1. "Mustard" – 1:28
2. "Any Old Time Will Do" – 4:13
3. "The Rain Came Down on Everything" – 6:35
4. "You Sure Got It Now" – 5:11

=== Side two ===
1. "Why Does Such a Pretty Girl Sing Those Sad Songs" – 4:34
2. "The Song" – 6:35
3. "Look Thru the Eyes of a Fool" – 2:55
4. "Interlude" – 1:23
5. "Get On Down Home" – 7:32

=== 1999 bonus tracks ===
10. "Oh What a Shame"
11. "Bengal Jig"
12. "Rattlesnake Roll" (Wizzard)
13. "Can't Help My Feelings" (Wizzard)
14. "Strider"
15. "Indiana Rainbow" (Roy Wood's Wizzard)
16. "The Thing Is This (This Is the Thing)" (Roy Wood's Wizzard)

== Personnel ==
- Roy Wood – writer, producer, performer, engineer, artwork (sleeve painting and cartoon centrefold)
- Dick Plant – engineer
- Mike Plea – engineer
- Pete Oliff – engineer
- Roger Wake – engineer
- Steve Brown – engineer
- Annie Haslam – Backing vocals ("The Rain Came Down on Everything")
- Phil Everly – Co-lead and backing vocals ("Get on Down Home")
