= Goin' Down the Road (song) =

Single by Roy Wood
- B-side: "The Premium Bond Theme"
- Released: 7 June 1974
- Recorded: 1974
- Genre: Pop music, folk, reggae
- Length: 3:01
- Label: Harvest Records (HAR 5083)
- Songwriter: Roy Wood
- Producer: Roy Wood

Roy Wood singles chronology
"Forever" (1973)	"Goin' Down the Road" (1974)	"Oh What a Shame" (1975)

"Goin' Down the Road" is a 1974 single, which was written and produced by Roy Wood. Wood played all of the musical instruments on the recording, including the bagpipes, as well as supplying lead and multi-tracked backing vocals. The single bore the subtitle "(A Scottish Reggae Song)". The song was globally published by Carlin Music Corp.

The track reached number 13 in the UK Singles Chart. The single remained in the UK chart for seven weeks, starting in June 1974. It was also released as a single in New Zealand, Germany, Sweden, Switzerland, and Ireland.

"Goin' Down the Road" has appeared on numerous compilation albums, including Wood's own Singles (1993, Connoisseur Records) and The Wizzard!: Greatest Hits & More - The EMI Years.

The record still commands national radio play in the UK; the most recent airing being on BBC Radio 2's Pick of the Pops on 13 July 2019.
