= Main Street (Roy Wood & Wizzard album) =

Studio album by Roy Wood & Wizzard
- Released: 2000
- Recorded: 1976
- Genre: Jazz-rock, rock and roll
- Length: 38:39
- Label: Edsel
- Producer: Roy Wood

Roy Wood & Wizzard chronology
Introducing Eddy and the Falcons (1974)	Main Street (2000)

Singles from Main Street
- 1. "Indiana Rainbow" Released: 1976

Professional ratings
Review scores
Source	Rating
AllMusic	2/5 stars

Main Street is the third album by Wizzard credited to Roy Wood & Wizzard which was recorded in 1976 and eventually released in 2000.

== Background and release ==
At the time of the recording of the album Main Street (or Wizzo as it was originally to be called) in 1976, the group had rather slipped out of the public eye and was on the point of disbanding.

The lead single from the album, also credited to Roy Wood's Wizzard, "Indiana Rainbow" (backed by a non-album track "The Thing Is This (This Is The Thing)"), released in March 1976, did not make the BBC Radio 1 playlist. As a result, Jet Records, to whom Wood was signed at the time, cancelled the album's release.

Several songs from the album were reused later. "French Perfume" was performed live by the Wizzo Band, which Wood formed the following year, on their BBC 'Sight and Sound In Concert' spot (a simulcast on BBC TV and Radio 1 in stereo) in April 1977, and "Saxmaniacs", an instrumental, was released in 1979 as the b-side to a Wood solo single, "(We're) On The Road Again".

The original tapes eventually came to light in 1999 and, with Wood's blessing, released by Edsel, a re-issue label which specialised largely in licensing long-deleted albums from major companies which had recently made Introducing Eddy & the Falcons available on CD for the first time.

In the booklet which accompanied its belated appearance, Wood wrote that "this was probably a last attempt to retain some sort of sanity, trying to grow up, and not carry on indefinitely being just another pop group." Had it been successful, he went on, his writing would have taken a different route and the group would have gone on to perform the kind of music bands like Jamiroquai were recording by that time. The music is certainly more jazz-rock based, and represents a conscious effort to leave the more commercial pop-rock element behind.

In 2006, the compilation album, Looking Thru' The Eyes of Roy Wood and Wizzard was released, which included two songs from Main Street as well as b-side "The Thing Is This (This Is The Thing)" and a previously unreleased album out-take, "Human Cannonball".

"Human Cannonball" was later included on the 2020 CD reissue of the album and according to the booket it was planned as track 3 between "Saxmaniax" and "The Fire in His Guitar" of the original intended album release.

== Track listing ==
All songs written by Roy Wood.

1. "Main Street" – 6:03
2. "Saxmaniacs" – 3:05
3. "The Fire in His Guitar" – 7:17
4. "French Perfume" – 4:45
5. "Take My Hand" – 3:58
6. "Don’t You Feel Better" – 5:13
7. "Indiana Rainbow" – 4:00
8. "I Should Have Known" – 4:38

Bonus track on the 2020 reissue

9. "Human Cannonball"

== Personnel ==
- Roy Wood - guitars, lead and backing vocals, saxophones, oboe, upright bass, French horn, electric sitar, bass clarinet, electronic keyboards, bass guitar, drums
- Rick Price - bass guitar, pedal steel guitar
- Charlie Grima - drums, congas, percussion, vocals on "Don't You Feel Better"
- Bob Brady – piano
- Nick Pentelow - saxophones, flutes
- Mike Burney – saxophones, flutes

With

- Richard Plant - vocals on "Take My Hand"
