= Boulders (album) =

Studio album by Roy Wood
- Released: 20 July 1973
- Recorded: 1969–71
- Studio: Phonogram (London, UK); Abbey Road (London, UK)
- Genre: Pop; rock; psychedelia; rock and roll; art rock; folk; classical; country
- Length: 40:09
- Label: Harvest; United Artists
- Producer: Roy Wood

Roy Wood chronology
Boulders (1973)	Mustard (1975)

Singles from Boulders
- 1. "When Gran'ma Plays the Banjo" Released: 18 January 1972; 2. "Dear Elaine" Released: 27 July 1973

Boulders is the debut solo album by English musician Roy Wood, recorded from 1969 to 1971 and released on 20 July 1973 by Harvest Records. Wood began work on the album as a whimsical side-project away from his band the Move, and conceived it to explore numerous instruments he had collected in the 1960s but felt unable to use in the Move. Nonetheless, its release was delayed for several years due to his busy schedule with the Move, Wizzard and the Electric Light Orchestra. Apart from harmonium on one song played by John Kurlander, all the instruments on the album, including guitars, cello, saxophones, bouzouki, banjo and recorders, were played by Wood, who also wrote, arranged, and produced the whole record, in addition to providing all the vocals. The musician also painted the unfinished self-portrait on the cover.

The record is eclectic and eccentric in style, exploring numerous genres like classical music, art rock, folk, psychedelia, country and rock and roll, and exemplifies Wood's surreal humour, with songs exploring curious subjects. The textured production includes multitracked choir-like vocals and makes heavy usage of unusual arrangements. Upon release, Boulders was hailed by critics for its individual sound and the extensive contributions from Wood, and today is regarded as one of his strongest works. It peaked at No. 15 in the UK Albums Chart, and the single "Dear Elaine" was a Top 20 hit. The album also reached the Billboard 200 in the United States, where the album was released by United Artists Records. A remastered edition of Boulders was released by EMI in 2007, and another version was released as part of the Original Album Series box set in 2015.

== Background and recording ==
Roy Wood recorded Boulders from 1969 to 1971 at Phonogram Studios and Abbey Road Studios, London. He was still a member of the Move at the time, who he formed some three years before work on Boulders began, and intended the album to be whimsical and childlike in order to represent a "creative holiday" from the band, who were experiencing their commercial peak at the time. In addition to featuring songs that Wood felt was unsuitable for the Move or other artists, some of the material on the album was developed from ideas that he came up with when experimenting with new instrumentation that he did not have an opportunity to use with the Move. He later explained: "I'd started the Move when I was 17, and I used to spend money buying weird instruments and getting them from second-hand shops. It's difficult to have them in your collection and not want to have a go at playing them."

With the exception of harmonium by Abbey Road engineer John Kurlander on "Songs of Praise", all the instrumentation on Boulders was played by Wood, who also provided all lead, harmony and backing vocals. A total of nineteen instruments are credited to Wood, including cello, steel guitar, mandolin, cittern, bouzouki, double bass, saxophones, brass and bassoon. Due to Wood's very heavy input, the record was described upon release as a rare true example of a solo album, departing from other artists' solo albums where session musicians are employed. Wood also produced the album and designed its packaging, which features a painted self-portrait. The painting was left incomplete at the suggestion of EMI staff. Roger Wake engineered the Phonogram sessions, while the Abbey Road sessions were engineered by John Kurlander, Nick Webb and Alan Parsons, the latter of whom prompted Wood to wear a rain hat and yellow sou'wester for the splashed water sounds on "Wake Up". Making use of a nascent production trick, the musician slowed down or sped up the tape while recording background vocals for some songs to expand his already large singing range.

== Composition ==
Boulders is an eccentric album that features tuneful, melodic songs with unusual arrangements. An eclectic pop record, it features styles of bluegrass, experimental music, classical music, psychedelia, rock and roll, pastoral folk music, art rock, baroque pop, and country, with elements of jazz and blues. The record also features luscious West Coast-style harmonies and instances of studio trickery and surreal humour, embracing what writer Terry Staunton describes as a quaint, curious Englishness. The record's lyrics are said to exemplify Wood's combination of "odd imagination and non-sticky sentimentality". According to writer Stephen Thomas Erlewine, "Wood has an unerring knack for melodies, whether they're in folk ballads, sweet pop or old-fashioned rock & rollers, yet his brilliance is how he turns the hooks 180 degrees until they're gloriously out of sync with his influences and peers." The album occasionally replaces familiar textures with unusual alternatives, for instance the chorus of bass voices making "dywep" sounds instead of a bass guitar.

"The individual tracks are weird, to say the least. There's a straight jig (Irish Loafer), a Zappa-like spoof on a love-sick computer, a hillbilly banjo pickin' song and a rock 'n' roll medley (and that's just one side!)"

—Dave Lewis, Acton Gazette

"Songs of Praise" features a gospel-style chorus made up of Wood's sped-up, multi-tracked voice overdubs. He originally wrote the song for the New Seekers, whose version reached the final six for the British entry to the 1972 Eurovision Song Contest. "Wake Up" is about separated lovers, presumably split by oceans, and was compared to the Move song "Curly" in its "uncomplicated pop" sound. The song's unusual percussion was provided by Wood splashing his hands rhythmically in two bowls of water, which were mic'ed up in stereo sound. "Rock Down Low" is a rocker with breaks and solos, while "Nancy Sing Me a Song" is reminiscent of the Move. "Dear Elaine" is a "semi-classical" experimental pop song reminiscent of Pink Floyd and Queen. It features a slow tempo, with Wood singing with acoustic guitar, French horns and bass, alongside sporadic usage of Wood's multitracked choir, in addition to as many overdubbed cellos as was possible.

Side two opens with a medley of "All the Way Over the Hill" and "Irish Loafer (And His Hen)", an upbeat recording with Beach Boys-style backing vocals. The "Irish Loafer" section incorporates a jig. Among Wood's favourite songs on Boulders is "Miss Clarke and the Computer", a "pseudo-madrigal" that concerns a computer falling in love with a female technician. The song features a mixture of cello, string bass, electric sitar and Welsh harp, as well as a jazzy middle eight that anticipates Wood's work with the Roy Wood Rock and Roll Band. Writer Micahel Bonner highlighted the song for its experimental nature, describing it as a "Monty Python does Fairport Convention distorted oddity".

Wood displays his banjo-playing on "When Gran'ma Plays the Banjo", a rodeo-style country song about a grandmother whose banjo skills impress local cowboys. Short solos on the instrument throughout the song are followed by rapturous applause. The closing medley starts in a country and western vein but develops into a "late 50s rock anthology", with Wood's impersonations of Elvis Presley on the "Rockin' Shoes" section and the Everly Brothers on the "She's Too Good for Me" section comparable to the vintage American pop influences Wood explored with Wizzard. The musician had previously attempted recording "She's Too Good for Me" in 1968 with Move bandmate Trevor Burton, before re-recording the song entirely himself for Boulders. These early attempts were released on The Move's Movements box set in 1997 and on Anthology 1966–1972 in 2009.

== Release and promotion ==
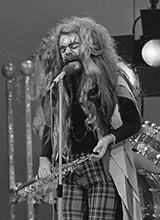
Roy Wood in 1974, the same year he toured the United States.

Despite being completed in 1971, Boulders was delayed for release until 1973 due to Wood's busy schedule with the Move, Electric Light Orchestra and then Wizzard. Wood's then manager, Don Arden, was particularly demanding that the release of Boulders was delayed, to avoid it clashing with the Move's material. In March 1973, the same month Wizzard released Wizzard Brew, United Artists Records printed a message in Billboard that described the soon-to-be-released Boulders as "an album of which the like you have never heard", describing advance reviews of the record as suggesting the album "could change the face of popular music. We'll leave that to history to decide." An advertisement in Melody Maker ran with the message: "There are solo albums and there are solo albums."

Boulders was released on 20 July 1973 by Harvest Records in the United Kingdom. It peaked at number 15 on the UK Albums Chart, staying on the chart for eight weeks. "When Gran'Ma Plays the Banjo" had been released as a single on 18 January 1972, with "Wake Up" as the B-side, but it failed to chart. More successful was the second single "Dear Elaine", with "Songs of Praise" as the B-side, released a week after the album, which reached number 18 on the UK Singles Chart in August 1973 and stayed on the chart for eight weeks. In the United States, Boulders was released that October by United Artists Records. The label supported the album by sending eight upper-echelon executives to twenty-five American cities to promote it, while Wood further promoted the record by touring the United States in March 1974. The album reached number 176 on the US Billboard 200, peaking in December and staying on the chart for six weeks.

Boulders was re-released in 2007 by EMI, who added a rough mix of "Dear Elaine" as a bonus track. This version of the album was remastered and featured a sixteen-page booklet with extensive liner notes. Wood later explained in an interview with The Telegraph that EMI did not inform him they were going to reissue the album, nor did they invite him to the remastering sessions, which were undertaken at Abbey Road Sessions. He explained: "Record companies seem to get the rights to put these old tracks out, but why didn't they ring me and say, 'Do you want to be involved in this?', or give me the tapes and let me do the remix myself? I mean, they're my songs. It would be nice to get them to sound the way I want them to." Boulders was later included as one of five Wood albums in the 2015 box set Original Album Series. The musician also included "Dear Elaine" and "Miss Clarke and the Computer" on his retrospective compilation Music Box in 2011.

== Critical reception ==
Professional ratings
Review scores
Source	Rating
AllMusic	4.5/5 stars
Christgau's Record Guide	A−
Encyclopedia of Popular Music	3/5 stars
Record Collector	3/5 stars

Boulders has received critical acclaim. Pete Butterfield of the Reading Evening Post highlighted the numerous roles Wood undertook, calling it "a real solo effort", and described the "glorious" pop album as "highly interesting – and very enjoyable". Basil Ashmore of the Buckinghamshire Examiner also commended Wood for composing, arranging, producing and playing the entire album. Though he complained about the production, finding Wood's voice to be deliberately "often almost drowned by the instruments", he felt the musicianship was impressive and that the album was easy to admire considering the "ingenuity and sheer hard graft" required to make it. Dave Lewis of the Acton Gazette found Boulders to be "no musical masterpiece, but an enjoyable pantomime of different styles, with Wood playing all the roles", while Gary Sperrazza of the Shakin' Street Gazette felt that it spotlighted Wood's "highly distinctive style of music", concluding that the album "stands alone in its own sphere as a bonafide masterpiece".

Nancy Erlich of The New York Times hailed Boulders as "an unquestionable classic of AM radio culture", writing that it culminates "all the technical feats and structural conventions that characterized sixties pop". A reviewer for Stereo Review considered Boulders to likely be the first "one-man show" rock album "that really succeeds", commenting that it came closer to the "imagination and pop savvy" of the Beatles than contemporary "Neo-Beatles" bands like Big Star, the Raspberries and Stories. Writing for Creem magazine, Robert Christgau hailed Boulders as "the best Move album since Message from the Country. As coldly captivating as ever, and you can imagine dancing to some of it." He named it the 17th best album of 1973, and in his Christgau's Record Guide, he hailed the album for its passionate multitracking and successful conceits, the latter of which he found to be "as substantial as Loudon Wainwright's, say, and more tuneful. And when they're Move-style conceits you can galumph to them."

Among retrospective reviews, Stephen Thomas Erlewine of AllMusic considers the "intricate, deliberately idiosyncratic record" to accurately capture "Roy Wood's peculiar genius, more so than anything else he recorded", writing that it "still sounds wonderfully out of time". Max Bell of Louder Sound similarly considers Boulders to perhaps be Wood's best ever project, while Terry Staunton of Record Collector considers the album's quaint, curious sound to be a "surprising and refreshing detour" from Wood's work with Wizzard. Alexis Petridis of The Guardian considers Boulders and its follow-up Mustard to be "extraordinary, maverick solo albums". Similarly, Michael Bonner of Uncut considers both albums to be the "twin high points" of Wood's career, whereas writer Colin Larkin considers them to be "uneven", but notes how they revealed Wood's numerous "creative energies". A feature in Hi-Fi News and Record Review considered the "stunning" album to be a "long-lost, curelly overlooked masterpiece", highlighting its "[p]erfect pop pastiches, including the best-ever impression of the Beach Boys", while Uncut magazine's Ultimate Record Collection describes Boulders as a summation of Wood's career and "a one-man hymn to the redemptive power of pop music".

== Track listing ==
All songs written by Roy Wood.

=== Side one ===
1. "Songs of Praise" – 4:40
2. "Wake Up" – 3:19
3. "Rock Down Low" – 3:25
4. "Nancy Sing Me a Song" – 3:28
5. "Dear Elaine" – 4:09

=== Side two ===
1. Medley: "All the Way over the Hill" / "Irish Loafer (and His Hen)" – 4:49
2. "Miss Clarke and the Computer" – 4:20
3. "When Gran'ma Plays the Banjo" – 3:12
4. Rock Medley: "Rockin' Shoes" / "She's Too Good for Me" / "Locomotive" – 7:31

=== 2007 CD bonus track ===
10. "Dear Elaine" (rough mix) – 4:12

== Personnel ==
- Roy Wood – lead and backing vocals, electric and acoustic guitars, bass guitar, steel guitar, piano, drums, percussion, mandolin, cittern, bouzouki, banjo, electric sitar, violin, cello, double bass, brass, saxophones, oboe, bassoon, recorders, harp, glockenspiel, harmonica, water bowl, sound effects, production, cover art
- John Kurlander – harmonium (track 1)
