= Forever (Roy Wood song) =

Single by Roy Wood
- B-side: "Music To Commit Suicide By"
- Released: 16 November 1973
- Recorded: 1973
- Genre: Pop music
- Length: 4:09
- Label: Harvest Records (HAR 5078)
- Songwriter: Roy Wood
- Producer: Roy Wood

Roy Wood singles chronology
"Dear Elaine" (1973)	"Forever" (1973)	"Goin' Down the Road" (1974)

Official audio
- "Forever" on YouTube

"Forever" is a 1973 single, which was written and produced by Roy Wood. Wood played all of the musical instruments on the recording, as well as supplying lead and multi-tracked backing vocals. The song was globally published by Carlin Music Corp.

The track reached number 8 in the UK Singles Chart. The single remained in the UK chart for 13 weeks, straddling the final month of 1973 and the start of the following year. The single enjoyed a higher placing in the UK chart in January 1974, than Wizzard's "I Wish It Could Be Christmas Everyday". The A-side of the single's label bore the script "with special thanks to Brian Wilson and Neil Sedaka for their influence". The track was also released as a single in New Zealand, the Netherlands, Portugal and South Africa.

Wood appeared with the song on BBC's Top of the Pops on three occasions: 20 December 1973, 3 January 1974 and 17 January 1974.

"Forever" has appeared on numerous compilation albums, including Wood's own Singles (1993, Connoisseur Records). and Through the Years: The Best of Roy Wood.

== Reception ==
Alexis Petridis, writing in The Guardian, described it as "a solo hit that imagined what it would be like if Neil Sedaka had joined The Beach Boys with beautiful results".

=== Charts ===
Chart (1973/74)	Peak position
Australia (Kent Music Report)	43
United Kingdom (Official Charts Company)	8
