= Starting Up =

Studio album by Roy Wood
- Released: February 1987
- Recorded: 1985–86
- Studio: Sinewave Studios and The Old Smithy Recording Studios
- Genre: Rock
- Length: 35.55
- Label: Legacy
- Producer: Roy Wood

Roy Wood chronology
On The Road Again (1979)	Starting Up (1987)

Starting Up is the fourth solo album by Roy Wood, who played most of the instruments and sang most of the vocals throughout, in addition to writing and producing the album. The album was released in February 1987. The track "On Top of the World", featured strings arranged and conducted by Louis Clark.

"Under Fire" (1985) and "Raining in the City" (1986) were both previously released as singles.

== Track listing ==
1. "Red Cars Are After Me" – 3:55
2. "Raining in the City" – 4:16
3. "Under Fire" – 4:23
4. "Turn Your Body to the Light" – 4:33
5. "Hot Cars" – 3:12
6. "Starting Up" – 3:19
7. "Keep It Steady" – 3:46
8. "On Top of the World" – 3:27
9. "Ships in the Night" – 5:04
