= Super Active Wizzo =

Studio album by Wizzo Band
- Released: September 1977
- Studio: De Lane Lea Studios
- Genres: Rock, jazz fusion, progressive rock
- Labels: Warner Bros. Wounded Bird (2007 reissue)
- Producer: Roy Wood

Super Active Wizzo is the only album by the short-lived Wizzo Band, formed by Roy Wood in 1977 to fulfill his more jazz-oriented ambitions. The band also released the two singles "The Stroll", preceding the album, and "Dancin’ at the Rainbow’s End". Neither singles nor album charted and the band split up in 1978.

The line-up included Rick Price (pedal steel guitar), Bob Wilson (trombone), Billy Paul (alto and baritone saxes), Paul Robbins (keyboards, backing vocals), Graham Gallery (bass) and Dave Donovan (drums).

"Waitin' at This Door" was also used as the B-side to "Dancin' at the Rainbow’s End", while "Giant Footsteps" was the B-side to the band's first single, "The Stroll", and also ended up as the B-side to the Wood solo single "Keep Your Hands on the Wheel".

== Track listing ==
1. "Life Is Wonderful" – (Roy Wood) - 8:37
2. "Waitin' at This Door" – (Roy Wood) - 5:48
3. "Another Wrong Night" – (Roy Wood) - 11:15
4. "Sneakin" – (Roy Wood) - 6:25
5. "Giant Footsteps [Jubilee]" – (Roy Wood, Annie Haslam, Dave Donovan) - 5:59
6. "Earthrise" – (Music: Roy Wood Lyrics: Roy Wood, Dick Plant) - 11:22

== Personnel ==
- Roy Wood - guitars, lead and backing vocals, electric sitar, sopranino, alto, tenor and baritone saxophones, clavinet, Moog synthesizer, bass, double bass
- Billy Paul - alto and baritone saxophones
- Bob Wilson - trombone
- Rick Price - pedal steel and electric guitars
- Paul Robbins - backing vocals
- Graham Gallery - bass
- Dave Donovan - drums
