= Wizzo Band =

UK musical group (1975–1978)

- Origin: Birmingham, Warwickshire, England
- Genres: Jazz rock, rock, progressive rock
- Years active: 1975–1978
- Label: Warner Bros.
- Spinoff of: Wizzard
- Past members: Roy Wood; Rick Price; Bob Wilson; Billy Paul; Paul Robbins; Graham Gallery; Dave Donovan

Wizzo Band were an English jazz rock band formed by Roy Wood after Wizzard split in 1975, fulfilling his ambitions to create an ensemble that was more jazz-orientated than rock or pop. The line-up included former Wizzard and Move member Rick Price (pedal steel guitar), alongside Bob Wilson (trombone), Billy Paul (alto and baritone saxes), Paul Robbins (keyboards, backing vocals), Graham Gallery (bass), and Dave Donovan (drums).

A lot of people had been doing jazz-rock stuff. There had been jazz musicians getting into the rock field, like Chick Corea and Stanley Clarke, but it's very rare that you find a band doing it the other way around a rock and roll band getting into jazz, and it's quite interesting. The rhythm section is very heavy, almost Zeppelinish, the horns are very jazzy and the songs are very commercial, so it makes for quite an interesting combination.

- Roy Wood, Melody Maker, 3 September 1977

They played one show, broadcast live by BBC Television and BBC Radio 1 in the Sight and Sound in Concert series, on 2 April 1977. Most of the material they played was new, though they also included The Move's "California Man", interpolating the basic riff from another Move oldie, "Brontosaurus", and Wizzard's "Are You Ready to Rock". Several of the songs appeared on their only album Super Active Wizzo, released in September 1977 on the Warner Bros. record label. They also issued two singles, "The Stroll" (1977), and "Dancin' At The Rainbow’s End" (1978). None of the recordings charted.

A UK tour was scheduled for spring 1978, but was cancelled as they disbanded at around the same time. Wizzo Band had proved an uncommercial venture; the records received unenthusiastic reviews from critics who were baffled by the music, especially in the light of Wood's earlier track record as a creator of hit records with his previous bands, and they were ignored by radio programmers.

The live version of "California Man" was issued as the B-side of Wood's 1982 single "O.T.T.", under the title "Mystery Song". A similar arrangement was used by Cheap Trick in their own cover version of the song.

== Discography ==
=== Albums ===
- Super Active Wizzo (1977)

=== Singles ===
- "The Stroll" / "Jubilee" (1977)
- "Dancin' At The Rainbow's End" / "Waitin' At This Door" (1978)
