= The Electric Light Orchestra (album) =

1971 debut album by Electric Light Orchestra

Studio album by The Electric Light Orchestra
- Released: 3 December 1971
- Recorded: July 1970 – June 1971
- Studio: Philips (London)
- Genre: Progressive rock
- Length: 41:30
- Labels: Harvest; United Artists
- Producers: Roy Wood; Jeff Lynne

The Electric Light Orchestra chronology
| The Electric Light Orchestra (1971) | ELO 2 (1973) |

Singles from The Electric Light Orchestra
- 1. "10538 Overture" Released: 23 June 1972

The Electric Light Orchestra is the debut studio album by English rock band Electric Light Orchestra (ELO), released on 3 December 1971 in the United Kingdom by Harvest Records. In the United States, the album was released on 2 March 1972 as No Answer, after a misunderstood telephone message made by a United Artists Records executive asking about the album name; the caller, having failed to reach the ELO contact, wrote down "no answer" in his notes, and this was misconstrued to be the name of the album. It is one of two ELO albums to not feature keyboardist Richard Tandy, the other being 2015's Alone in the Universe.

== Recording ==
The album is focused on the core trio of Roy Wood, Jeff Lynne and Bev Bevan, who were the remaining members of rock group the Move. The Move were still releasing singles in the UK at the same time as this project was undertaken, but interest was soon to be abandoned in Wood's former band. In fact, the Move's final album, Message from the Country, was recorded simultaneously with The Electric Light Orchestra.

The sound on The Electric Light Orchestra is unique on this recording in comparison to the more slickly produced ELO albums of the subsequent Lynne years, incorporating many wind instruments and replacing guitar parts with heavy, "sawing" cello riffs, giving this recording an experimental "baroque-and-roll" feel. Because Wood, Lynne, and Bevan were the only members, the album utilized many overdubs (with some tracks having well over 10) and doubling on instruments. Lynne and Wood did the strings (with Wood doing the woodwinds and Lynne doing the keyboards) while Bevan stuck with percussion and drums. On the track "The Battle of Marston Moor (July 2nd, 1644)," Wood had to provide the percussion as well because Bev Bevan, normally the group's percussionist and drummer, refused to play on the track due to his low opinion of it.

The album cover depicts a pop-art lightbulb sculpture in the middle of a large empty baroque-style dance hall with modern electric lights livening up the room. The back cover depicts Wood, Lynne, and Bevan adorned in era-appropriate clothing and playing classical instruments (a cello, a violin, and a piccolo, respectively). The image is depicted in wall-eye style, as if they are reflected within the lightbulb's dome. The gatefold cover opens up to reveal several black and white images relating to the songs (such as a radio for "Mr. Radio") as well as another picture of the band next to the credits and personnel.

== Release ==
Professional ratings
Review scores
| Source | Rating |
|---|---|
| AllMusic | 4/5 stars |
| Christgau's Record Guide | B− |
| Creem | C+ |
| The Encyclopedia of Popular Music | 2/5 stars |
| MusicHound Rock: The Essential Album Guide | 3/5 stars |
| The Rolling Stone Album Guide | 3/5 stars |

"Queen of the Hours", which later became the B-side to "Roll Over Beethoven" from the band's second album ELO 2, was the first ever published ELO song, released by Harvest Records in November 1971 in a compilation called The Harvest Bag which featured various Harvest Records artists.

The original LP was mixed in Quadraphonic sound but was only released in this format in South America. Many of these "quad" tracks appeared with the SQ encoding intact on the "First Light" series edition of the album and on a later double-CD release entitled Early ELO, 1971–1974 (available only as an import in the US). The entire "quad" version with SQ encoding intact has since been released on disc 3 of the Harvest Years compilation.

The original album art was designed by Hipgnosis; the photographs of the band on the back of the album cover, dressed in 17th-century period costume, were taken at the Banqueting House in Whitehall, adding to the Baroque flavour and emphasis on Stuart Britain found on the record.

"Mr. Radio" was intended to be the second single from the album, but was subsequently withdrawn. The edited single version made its first appearance on the 2005 compilation album Harvest Showdown instead.

== Track listing ==
Side one
| No. | Title | Writer(s) | Lead vocals | Length |
|---|---|---|---|---|
| 1. | "10538 Overture" | Jeff Lynne | Jeff Lynne | 5:32 |
| 2. | "Look at Me Now" | Roy Wood | Roy Wood | 3:17 |
| 3. | "Nellie Takes Her Bow" | Lynne | Lynne | 5:59 |
| 4. | "The Battle of Marston Moor (July 2nd 1644)" | Wood | Wood | 6:03 |

Side two
| No. | Title | Writer(s) | Lead vocals | Length |
|---|---|---|---|---|
| 5. | "First Movement (Jumping Biz)" | Wood | instrumental | 3:00 |
| 6. | "Mr. Radio" | Lynne | Lynne | 5:04 |
| 7. | "Manhattan Rumble (49th Street Massacre)" | Lynne | instrumental | 4:22 |
| 8. | "Queen of the Hours" | Lynne | Lynne | 3:22 |
| 9. | "Whisper in the Night" | Wood | Wood | 4:50 |
| Total length: | | | | 41:30 |

Bonus tracks (US 2006 Remaster)
| No. | Title | Writer(s) | Length |
|---|---|---|---|
| 10. | "Battle of Marston Moor" (Take 1 alternate mix) | Wood | 1:00 |
| 11. | "Nellie Takes Her Bow" (Alternate mix) | Lynne | 6:02 |
| 12. | "Mr. Radio" (Take 9) | Lynne | 5:19 |
| 13. | "10538 Overture" (Alternate mix) | Lynne | 5:46 |

Bonus tracks (40th Anniversary Edition)
| No. | Title | Writer(s) | Length |
|---|---|---|---|
| 10. | "10538 Overture" (Acetate version) | Lynne | 5:23 |
| 11. | "Mr. Radio" (Take 9, recorded 18 November 1970) | Lynne | 5:18 |
| 12. | "Nellie Takes Her Bow" (Alternate mix) | Lynne | 6:02 |
| 13. | "Whisper in the Night" (Take 1/Take 2 edit) | Wood | 4:59 |
| 14. | "Mr. Radio" (Single edit) | Lynne | 3:56 |
| 15. | "10538 Overture" (for Top of the Pops) | Lynne | 4:42 |

== The Electric Light Orchestra (First Light Series) ==
The Electric Light Orchestra (First Light Series)

Studio album by Electric Light Orchestra
- Released: 2001
- Recorded: July 1970 – June 1972
- Labels: Harvest, EMI
- Producers: Roy Wood, Jeff Lynne

Electric Light Orchestra chronology
| Zoom (2001) | The Electric Light Orchestra (First Light Series) (2001) | ELO 2 (First Light Series) (2003) |

CD 2 First Light
- First Light cover

Professional ratings
Review scores
| Source | Rating |
|---|---|
| Artistdirect.com | 4.5/5 stars |

The Electric Light Orchestra (First Light Series) is a two-disc expanded special 30th anniversary edition of their debut album.

Released in 2001 in the UK, disc one contains the original ELO album plus bonus tracks and an interactive CD-ROM feature, while disc two features the oldest surviving live ELO material with co/founder Roy Wood and cellist Andy Craig.

=== Disc one ===
The Electric Light Orchestra
| No. | Title | Writer(s) | Length |
|---|---|---|---|
| 1. | "10538 Overture" | Lynne | 5:32 |
| 2. | "Look at Me Now" | Wood | 3:17 |
| 3. | "Nellie Takes Her Bow" | Lynne | 5:59 |
| 4. | "The Battle of Marston Moor (July 2nd 1644)" | Wood | 6:03 |
| 5. | "First Movement (Jumping Biz)" | Wood | 3:00 |
| 6. | "Mr. Radio" | Lynne | 5:04 |
| 7. | "Manhattan Rumble (49th Street Massacre)" | Lynne | 4:22 |
| 8. | "Queen of the Hours" | Lynne | 3:22 |
| 9. | "Whisper in the Night" | Wood | 4:50 |

Bonus tracks
| No. | Title | Writer(s) | Length |
|---|---|---|---|
| 10. | "Battle of Marston Moor" (take 1) | Wood | 1:00 |
| 11. | "10538 Overture" (take 1) | The Move/ELO | 5:46 |

Enhanced multimedia section with interactive menu leading to EMI Promotional Film: 10538 Overture (May 1972)

=== Disc two ===
First Light
| No. | Title | Length |
|---|---|---|
| 1. | "Brian Matthew Introduces ELO" | 0:37 |
| 2. | "10538 Overture" (acetate version) | 5:24 |
| 3. | "Look at Me Now" (quad mix) | 3:19 |
| 4. | "Nellie Takes Her Bow" (quad mix) | 5:59 |
| 5. | "Battle of Marston Moor (July 2nd, 1644)" (quad mix) | 5:55 |
| 6. | "Jeff's Boogie No. 2" (live) (early version of "In Old England Town") | 6:58 |
| 7. | "Whisper in the Night" (live) | 5:45 |
| 8. | "Great Balls of Fire" (live) | 5:40 |
| 9. | "Queen of the Hours" (quad mix) | 3:18 |
| 10. | "Mr. Radio" (take 9) | 5:18 |
| 11. | "10538 Overture" (BBC session) | 4:38 |
| 12. | "Whisper in the Night" (take 1) (hidden track) | 5:00 |

== Personnel ==
- Jeff Lynne – vocals, piano, electric guitar, acoustic guitar, percussion, bass guitar
- Roy Wood – vocals, cello, classical acoustic guitar, bass guitar, double bass, oboe, bassoon, clarinet, recorders, slide guitar, percussion
- Bev Bevan – drums, percussion
- Bill Hunt – french horn, hunting horn
- Steve Woolam – violin

== Charts ==
| Chart (1972) | Peak position |
|---|---|
| Australian Albums (Kent Music Report) | 54 |
| UK Albums (Official Charts) | 32 |
| US Billboard 200 | 196 |
