= Roy Wood =

English rock musician (born 1947)

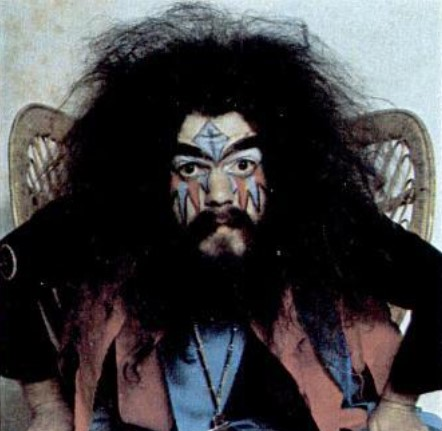
- Wood in 1974
- Born: 8 November 1947 (age 79); Birmingham, England
- Occupations: Musician; singer; songwriter; record producer; composer
- Years active: 1964–present
- Spouse(s): Unknown (divorced); Maureen Holmes (divorced)
- Musical career
- Genres: Glam rock; psychedelia; progressive rock; jazz-rock
- Instruments: Vocals; guitar; bass; keyboards; drums; cello; saxophone; oboe; bagpipes
- Labels: Deram; Regal Zonophone; Fly; Cube; Harvest; United Artists; EMI; Warner Bros.; Jet; Cheapskate; Speed; Legacy
- Formerly of: The Move; Electric Light Orchestra; Wizzard; Wizzo Band
- Website: roywood.co.uk

Roy Wood (born 8 November 1947) is an English musician, singer and songwriter. He was particularly successful in the 1960s and 1970s as member and co-founder of the Move, Electric Light Orchestra and Wizzard.

Wood formed the Move in 1965, and had hits including "Flowers in the Rain". While the Move were still together, Wood, along with his band colleagues Jeff Lynne and Bev Bevan, founded Electric Light Orchestra (ELO), which was later to gain major commercial success. After increasing tensions, Wood left ELO in 1972 and formed a new group, Wizzard, who had seven hits, including Wood's most regularly broadcast song, "I Wish It Could Be Christmas Every Day".

As a songwriter, Wood contributed a number of hits to the repertoire of the Move, ELO and Wizzard. Altogether, he had more than 20 singles in the UK singles chart under various guises, including three UK No. 1 hits. Wood was inducted into the Rock and Roll Hall of Fame in 2017 as a member of Electric Light Orchestra.

== Early life ==
Roy Wood was born on 8 November 1947 in Kitts Green, a suburb of Birmingham, England. For some years the legend persisted that his real name was Ulysses Adrian Wood, until it was revealed that this was probably the result of somebody close to the Move in their early days filling in such names on a 'lifelines' feature for the press as a joke.

== Career ==
=== Early years ===
His first group in Birmingham in the early 1960s was the Falcons, which he left in 1963 to join Gerry Levene and the Avengers. Their 1964 single "Doctor Feelgood" was the recording debut for both Wood and future Moody Blues drummer Graeme Edge. He then moved to Mike Sheridan and the Nightriders (the band later became the Idle Race). He attended the Moseley College of Art, but was expelled in 1964.

=== The Move ===
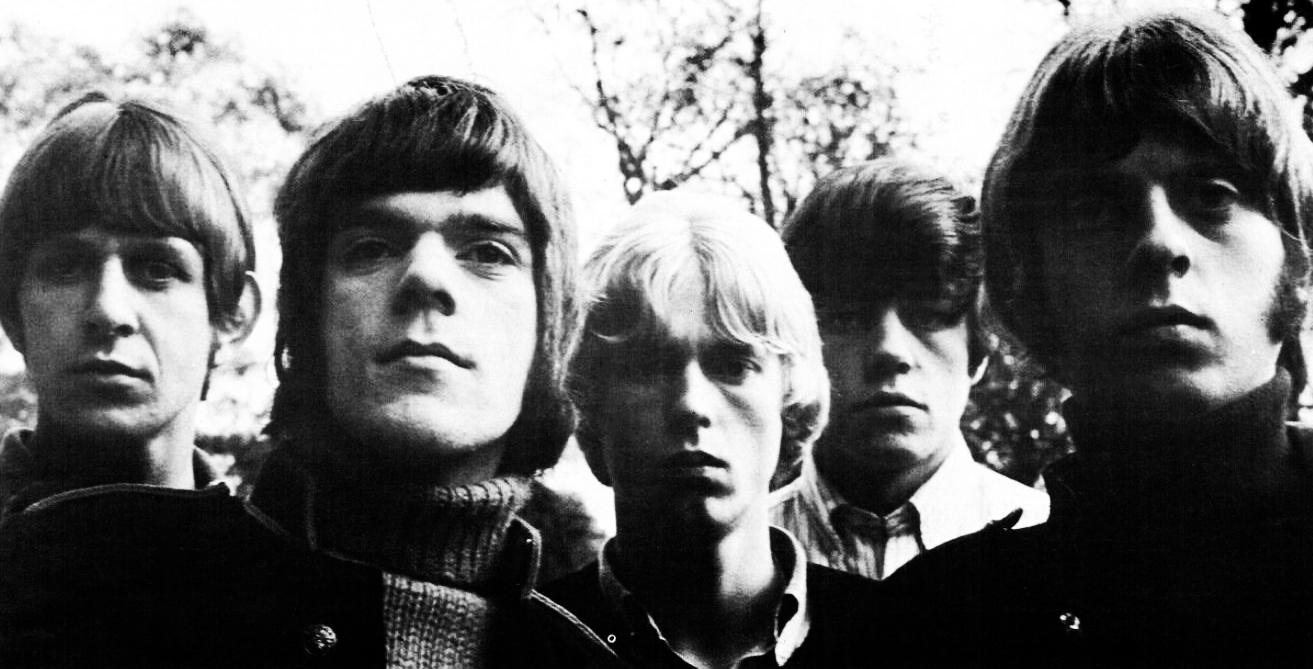
Wood, second from the left, with The Move in 1967

The freakbeat group the Move was formed from other Birmingham-based groups, and quickly entered the UK singles chart. Their single "Night of Fear" climbed to No. 2 in early 1967. Their third hit, "Flowers in the Rain", was the first song played by Tony Blackburn at the launch of BBC Radio 1 on September 30, 1967, and the band evolved over a three-year period. After the departure of the Move's lead singer Carl Wayne, Wood's influence became more prominent. In 1967, Wood (and fellow Move member Trevor Burton) sang backing vocals on the track "You Got Me Floatin'", on the Jimi Hendrix Experience's album Axis: Bold as Love.

Wood was keen on musical experimentation, and was an early proponent of combining rock and roll and pop music with other styles, such as classical music, or the big band sound, and introduced classically styled string and brass sections into the pop record. In early 1972, Wood's composition "Songs of Praise" was shortlisted by the BBC as one of six possible choices for the UK entry in the Eurovision Song Contest 1972. When performed by the New Seekers on the Cliff Richard vehicle It's Cliff Richard!, the song finished in last place with 3,842 votes. The group included the track on their album We'd Like to Teach the World to Sing. Wood recorded his own version of "Songs of Praise", releasing it on the B-side of his 1973 single, "Dear Elaine".

=== Electric Light Orchestra ===
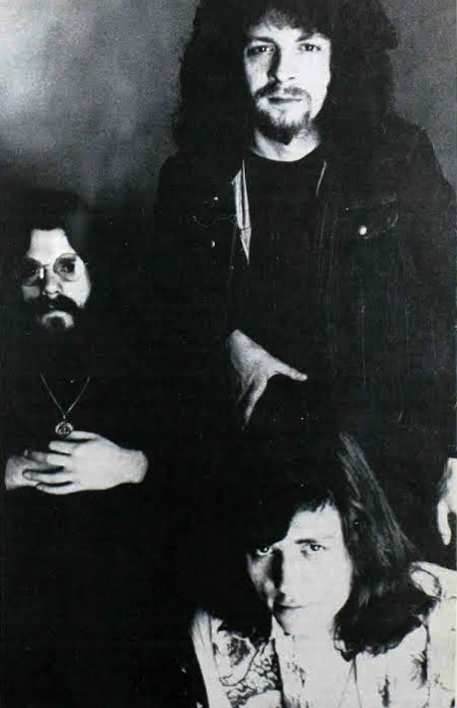
The Move/Electric Light Orchestra in 1972

While the Move were still together, Wood, along with his band colleagues Jeff Lynne and Bev Bevan, founded Electric Light Orchestra (ELO), which was later to gain major commercial success. The original intention was to split up the Move at the end of 1970, but contractual obligations meant that both they and ELO existed together for a year, until the former finally broke up in June 1972.

In 2017, the ELO line-up of Roy Wood, Jeff Lynne, Bev Bevan, and Richard Tandy were inducted into the Rock and Roll Hall of Fame.

ELO's early live performances were chaotic, due to both poor sound quality of the string instruments competing against the guitars and drums, as well as Wood's constant moving from instrument to instrument during the shows (playing bass, guitar, cello and saxophone). After increasing tensions, Wood left in July 1972 at the start of the second album sessions, following a trip to Italy.

=== Wizzard ===
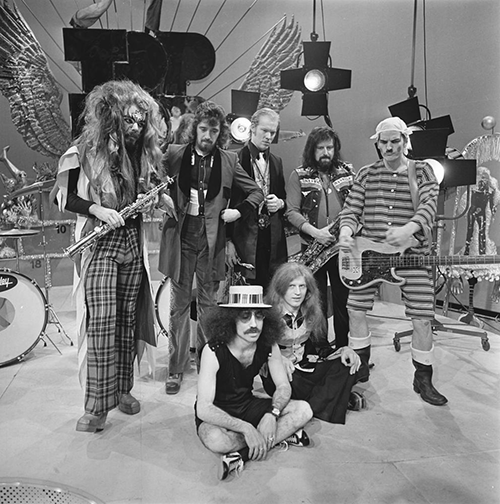
Roy Wood (left) with his band Wizzard, May 1974

After departing from ELO, he formed a new group, Wizzard, which assembled cellists, brass players and a bigger rhythm section, with several drummers and percussionists. Wood emulated the wall of sound production style of Phil Spector while successfully and affectionately pastiching the rock and roll style of the early 1960s. Wizzard had seven UK singles chart hits with different songs during this period including two consecutive singles, "See My Baby Jive" and "Angel Fingers" which reached the top of that chart. Meanwhile, he released several solo albums, exploring further musical directions. His 1973 album Boulders was an almost entirely solo effort, right down to the sleeve artwork, with Wood playing a wide variety of musical instruments. A second solo album, Mustard, released in 1975 and including contributions by Phil Everly and Annie Haslam, was less successful.

=== Post-Wizzard ===
By the late 1970s, Wood was appearing less in public; commercial success faded away, and his musical experiments did not always match popular taste, but he remained productive in the studio as musician, producer and songwriter. He was a fan of Elvis Presley, but never succeeded in getting him to adopt one of his compositions. He was a producer for other acts, including for doo-wop revivalists Darts. In 1976, Wood recorded the Beatles songs "Lovely Rita" and "Polythene Pam" for the musical documentary All This and World War II.

=== The Wizzo Band and subsequent work ===
In 1977, he formed Wizzo Band, a jazz-rock ensemble, whose only live performance was a BBC simultaneous television and radio broadcast in stereo. The Wizzo Band split early the following year after cancelling a nationwide tour.

Between 1980 and 1982, Wood released a few singles under his own name and also as Roy Wood's Helicopters, and played some live dates under this name, with a band comprising Robin George (guitar), Terry Rowley (keyboards), Jon Camp (bass) and Tom Farnell (drums). The release of what would have been the last of these singles, "Aerial Pictures", backed with "Airborne", was cancelled owing to the lack of chart success for its predecessors, but both sides appeared for the first time in 2006 on a compilation CD, Roy Wood – The Wizzard!. "Aerial Pictures", using the original backing track, subsequently became a solo single for Carl Wayne, the Move's former vocalist.

Wood also made a one-off rock and roll medley single with Phil Lynott, Chas Hodges and John Coghlan, credited to The Rockers, "We Are the Boys" (1983), and played a leading role in the Birmingham Heart Beat Charity Concert 1986, on 15 March 1986, which was later partly televised by the BBC. As well as designing the logo, Wood performed in a line-up which also included the Electric Light Orchestra and the Moody Blues.

After a hiatus following the release of the album Starting Up (1987), a cover version of the Len Barry hit "1–2–3", and a guest vocal appearance on one track on Rick Wakeman's The Time Machine, he went on the road with a band billed as Roy Wood's Army. He also wrote and recorded two tracks with Lynne in 1989 ("If You Don't Get What You Want, You Gotta Want What You Get" and "Me and You"), which were never released.

His most regularly broadcast song is the seasonal Wizzard single "I Wish It Could Be Christmas Everyday", which remains one of the most played Christmas songs in the UK. In 1995, Wood released a new live version as the 'Roy Wood Big Band', which charted at No. 59, and in 2000 he joined forces with Mike Batt and the Wombles, for a re-working of "I Wish It Could Be Christmas Everyday" and the Wombles' hit "Wombling Merry Christmas", together in one song which reached No. 22. Over Christmas 2007, Wood appeared in a catalogue advertisement for Argos, in which he played the part of a rowdy neighbour playing guitar along to Wizzard's "I Wish It Could Be Christmas Everyday", and the song once again entered the UK singles chart, peaking at No. 16. In the 2010 Christmas special of the ITV comedy Benidorm, Wood in a cameo role performed his Christmas hit at the Benidorm Palace cabaret theatre. He later performed with Wizzard on the Christmas edition of Pointless Celebrities in December 2013.

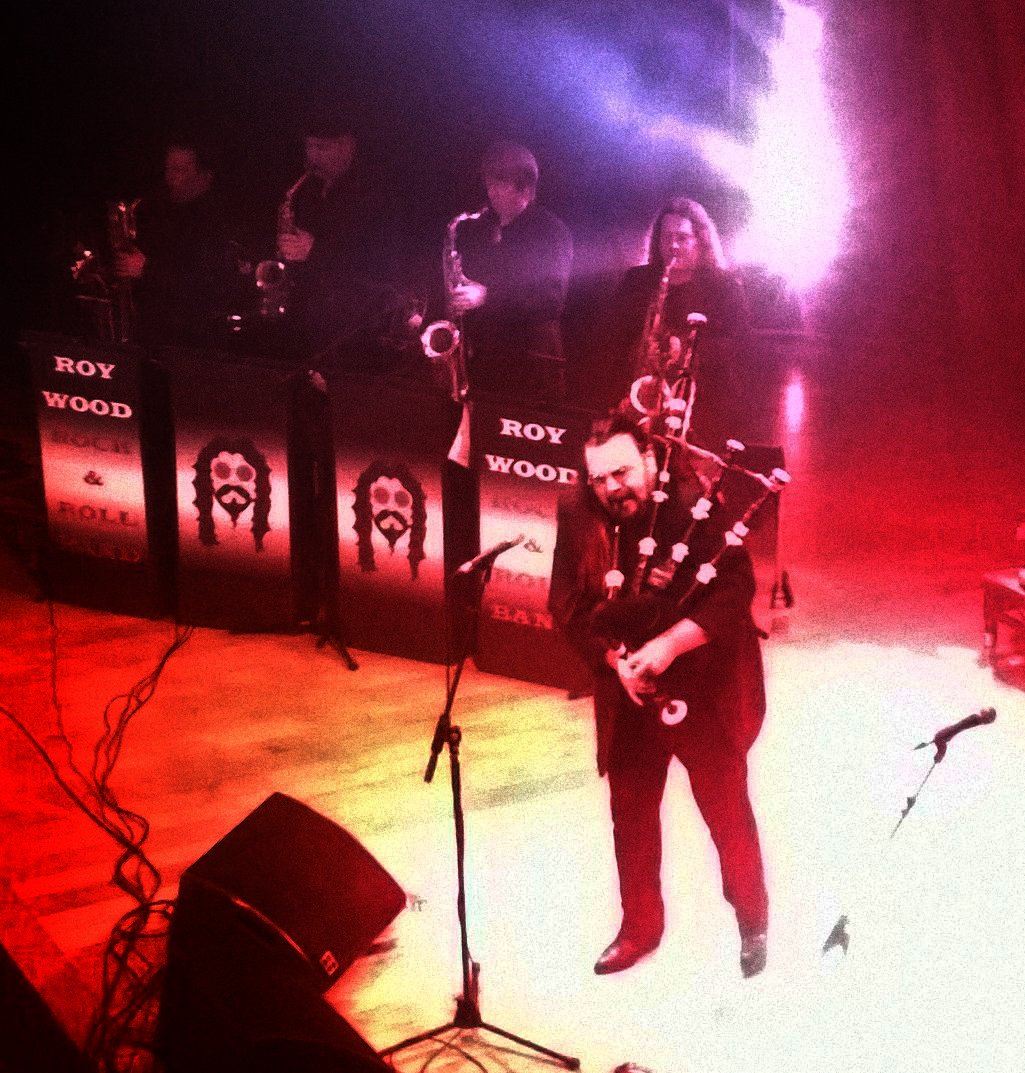
Wood playing Bagpipes in 2013

Wood formed the Roy Wood Rock & Roll Band for occasional live dates and television performances in the UK. They were the support act for Status Quo at several UK dates in the weeks leading up to Christmas 2009 and 2011. In December 2018, Wood and his band's touring equipment worth £100,000 was stolen following a ram-raid on a warehouse in Leeds. The police later recovered the van and equipment in East Ardsley.

== Personal life ==
Wood currently lives in South Derbyshire. He voted to leave the European Union in the 23 June 2016 referendum, and in May 2019 joined the Brexit Party. Beforehand, he was a longtime member of the UK Independence Party (UKIP), and expressed interest in standing as a candidate for the party in 2004. Wood has one daughter, named Holly.

Wood was engaged to Annie Haslam, lead vocalist for the progressive rock band Renaissance, for four years, which she would later describe as "four of the funniest years of my life" prior to her own marriage in 1991.

== Legacy ==
The BBC described Wood in 2008 as being "responsible for some of the most memorable sounds of the Seventies" and "credited as playing a major role in the glam rock, psychedelic and prog rock movements". In 2008, Wood was awarded an honorary doctorate for his contribution to rock and pop by the University of Derby. In 2015, his long and eclectic career was recognised with the "Outer Limits" award at the Progressive Music Awards in London.

Wood was inducted into the Rock and Roll Hall of Fame in 2017 as a member of Electric Light Orchestra.

== Discography ==
=== Chronological album discography ===
For the complete Move discography see The Move Discography
For the complete ELO discography see Electric Light Orchestra discography
For the complete Wizzard discography see Wizzard Discography

List of songs written by Roy Wood

- Move (1968) – The Move
- Shazam (1970) – The Move
- Looking On (1970) – The Move
- Message from the Country (1971) – The Move
- The Electric Light Orchestra (1971) – ELO
- ELO 2 (1973) – ELO (although uncredited at the time, Wood played cello and bass on "In Old England Town" and "From the Sun to the World").
- Wizzard Brew (1973) – Wizzard
- Boulders (1973) – Solo
- Introducing Eddy and the Falcons (1974) – Wizzard
- Mustard (1975) – Solo
- Super Active Wizzo (1977) – Wizzo Band
- On The Road Again (1979) – Solo
- Starting Up (1987) – Solo
- Main Street (2000) – Roy Wood & Wizzard (Recorded 1976)

=== Solo albums ===
Year	Title	UK	US Billboard 200
1973	Boulders	15	176
1975	Mustard	—	—
1979	On the Road Again	—	—
1987	Starting Up	—	—

=== Charting compilation albums ===
Year	Title	UK	US Billboard 200
1982	The Singles	37	—

=== Singles ===
Year	Title	Peak chart positions		Album
Year	Title	UK	AUS	Album
1972	"When Gran'ma Plays the Banjo"	—	—	Boulders
1973	"Dear Elaine"	18	—	Boulders
1973	"Forever"	8	43	Non-album single
1974	"Goin' Down the Road"	13	—	Non-album single
1975	"Oh What a Shame"	13	—	Non-album single
1975	"Look Thru' the Eyes of a Fool"	—	—	Mustard
1976	"Any Old Time Will Do"	—	—	Mustard
1977	"I Never Believed in Love" (with Annie Haslam)	—	—	Annie in Wonderland (Annie Haslam)
1978	"Keep Your Hands on the Wheel (Said Marie to the Driver)"	—	—	On the Road Again
1979	"(We're) On the Road Again"	—	—	On the Road Again
1980	"Rock City" (Roy Wood's Helicopters)	—	—	
1980	"Sing Out the Old... Bring in the New"	—	—	
1981	"Down to Zero"	—	—	
1981	"Green Glass Windows" (Roy Wood's Helicopters)	—	—	
1982	"It's Not Easy"	—	—	
1982	"O.T.T."	—	—	
1983	"We are the Boys (Who Make All the Noise)" (The Rockers)	—	—	
1985	"Under Fire"			Starting Up
1985	"Sing Out the Old... Bring in the New" (New recording)	—	—	
1986	"Raining in the City"	—		Starting Up
1987	"1–2–3"	—	—	
1995	"I Wish It Could Be Christmas Everyday" (The Roy Wood Big Band)	59	—	

==== As featured artist ====
Year	Title	UK	US Billboard Hot 100	Credited to
1986	"Waterloo"	45	—	Doctor and the Medics featuring Roy Wood
2000	"I Wish It Could Be a Wombling Merry Christmas Everyday"	22	—	The Wombles with Roy Wood

=== As producer, songwriter or session musician ===
Year	Release	Artists(s)	Notes
1969	"Caroline"	The Casuals	writer, producer
1969	"Dance Round The Maypole"	Acid Gallery	writer
1972	We'd Like to Teach the World to Sing	The New Seekers	writer of "Tonight" and "Songs of Praise"
1973	"Farewell"	Ayshea Brough	writer
1973	The London Bo Diddley Sessions	Bo Diddley	bass
1974	"Hazel Eyes"	Neil Reid	
1977	Annie in Wonderland	Annie Haslam	producer, session musician, writer of "I Never Believed in Love", "Hunioco" and "Rockalise"
1984	"Hong Kong Swing"	Cruella de Ville	co-producer
2009	My Christmas Card To You	The Shooting Stars	co-writer of "My Christmas Card To You"
